= 1974 FIFA World Cup Group 1 =

First group in 1974 FIFA World Cup

Group 1 of the 1974 FIFA World Cup was contested between 14 and 22 June 1974. This group was played in West Berlin and Hamburg. The pool was composed of the tournament host nation West Germany (Pot 1-Western Europe), with East Germany (Pot 2-Eastern Europe), Chile (Pot 3-South America) and Australia (Pot 4-Rest of the world).

== Standings ==
Pos	Team	Pld	W	D	L	GF	GA	GD	Pts	Qualification
1	East Germany	3	2	1	0	4	1	+3	5	Advance to second round
2	West Germany	3	2	0	1	4	1	+3	4	Advance to second round
3	Chile	3	0	2	1	1	2	−1	2	
4	Australia	3	0	1	2	0	5	−5	1	

Source: FIFA

== Matches ==
All times listed are local (CET)

=== West Germany vs Chile ===
14 June 1974
16:00

West Germany	1–0	Chile
Breitner 18'

Olympiastadion, West Berlin
Attendance: 81,100
Referee: Doğan Babacan (Turkey)

West Germany	Chile

GK	1	Sepp Maier
SW	5	Franz Beckenbauer (c)
RB	2	Berti Vogts
CB	4	Hans-Georg Schwarzenbeck
LB	3	Paul Breitner
CM	8	Bernhard Cullmann
CM	12	Wolfgang Overath	(substituted off) 75'
AM	14	Uli Hoeneß
RW	9	Jürgen Grabowski
LW	11	Jupp Heynckes
CF	13	Gerd Müller
Substitutions:
MF	17	Bernd Hölzenbein	(substituted on) 75'
Manager:
Helmut Schön

GK	1	Leopoldo Vallejos
RB	2	Rolando García	(yellow card) 59'
CB	5	Elías Figueroa
CB	3	Alberto Quintano
LB	4	Antonio Arias
RM	6	Juan Rodríguez		(substituted off) 83'
CM	8	Francisco Valdés (c)		(substituted off) 76'
CM	16	Guillermo Páez
LM	10	Carlos Reinoso	(yellow card) 47'
CF	7	Carlos Caszely	(yellow card) 13' (red card) 67'
CF	9	Sergio Ahumada
Substitutions:
FW	11	Leonardo Véliz		(substituted on) 76'
MF	14	Alfonso Lara		(substituted on) 83'
Manager:
Luis Alamos

Linesmen:
Jack Taylor (England)
Werner Winsemann (Canada)

=== East Germany vs Australia ===
This was the first ever fixture in the World Cup finals for Australia, with one West German newspaper labelling the team as “no-hope” Australians, and later printing an apology.

Australia kept the highly-fancied East German side scoreless until the second half, when Australia defender Colin Curran deflected the ball into his own team's net, making unwanted history by being the first Australia player in the World Cup to score a goal, albeit an own goal. East Germany forward Joachim Streich scored half-way through the second half, securing the 2–0 victory for East Germany.

14 June 1974
19:30

East Germany	2–0	Australia
Curran 58' (o.g.); Streich 72'

Volksparkstadion, Hamburg
Attendance: 17,000
Referee: Youssou N'Diaye (Senegal)

East Germany	Australia

GK	1	Jürgen Croy
SW	3	Bernd Bransch (c)
RB	18	Gerd Kische	(yellow card) 61'
CB	4	Konrad Weise
LB	12	Siegmar Wätzlich	(yellow card) 32'
CM	16	Harald Irmscher
CM	7	Jürgen Pommerenke
AM	14	Jürgen Sparwasser
RW	8	Wolfram Löwe		(substituted off) 55'
LW	15	Eberhard Vogel	(yellow card) 58'
CF	11	Joachim Streich
Substitutions:
RW	20	Martin Hoffmann		(substituted on) 55'
Manager:
Georg Buschner

GK	1	Jack Reilly
RB	2	Doug Utjesenovic
CB	3	Peter Wilson (c)
CB	4	Manfred Schäfer
LB	5	Colin Curran
MF	9	Johnny Warren
MF	6	Ray Richards
MF	8	Jimmy Mackay
MF	7	Jimmy Rooney
CF	12	Adrian Alston
CF	20	Branko Buljevic
Manager:
(Socialist Federal Republic of Yugoslavia) Rale Rasic

Linesmen:
Pablo Sánchez Ibáñez (Spain)
Omar Delgado Gómez (Colombia)

=== Australia vs West Germany ===
Australia, fielding a team of mostly semi-professional players who held day jobs alongside their football careers, were given little hope of achieving a result against West Germany, who were heavy favourites for the tournament. Despite being outclassed and losing to the hosts 3–0, Franz Beckenbauer reportedly acknowledged the Australians' effort when the match was over.

18 June 1974
16:00

Australia	0–3	West Germany
		Overath 12'; Cullmann 34'; Müller 53'

Volksparkstadion, Hamburg
Attendance: 53,300
Referee: Mahmoud Mustafa Kamel (Egypt)

Australia	West Germany

GK	1	Jack Reilly
DF	2	Doug Utjesenovic
DF	3	Peter Wilson (c)
DF	4	Manfred Schäfer
DF	5	Colin Curran
MF	6	Ray Richards
MF	7	Jimmy Rooney
MF	8	Jimmy Mackay	(yellow card) 56'
MF	19	Ernie Campbell		(substituted off) 45'
FW	12	Adrian Alston
FW	20	Branko Buljevic		(substituted off) 61'
Substitutions:
GK	21	Jim Milisavljevic
MF	11	Attila Abonyi		(substituted on) 45'
MF	13	Peter Ollerton		(substituted on) 61'
DF	15	Harry Williams
MF	18	Johnny Watkiss
Manager:
(Socialist Federal Republic of Yugoslavia) Rale Rasic

GK	1	Sepp Maier
SW	5	Franz Beckenbauer (c)
RB	2	Berti Vogts
CB	4	Hans-Georg Schwarzenbeck
LB	3	Paul Breitner
CM	14	Uli Hoeneß
CM	8	Bernhard Cullmann	(substituted off) 67'
CM	12	Wolfgang Overath
RW	9	Jürgen Grabowski
LW	11	Jupp Heynckes	(substituted off) 46'
CF	13	Gerd Müller
Substitutions:
GK	22	Wolfgang Kleff
DF	6	Horst-Dieter Höttges
MF	7	Herbert Wimmer	(substituted on) 67'
MF	10	Günter Netzer
LW	17	Bernd Hölzenbein	(substituted on) 46'
Manager:
Helmut Schön

Linesmen:
Alfonso González Archundia (Mexico)
Edison Peréz-Núñez (Peru)

=== Chile vs East Germany ===
18 June 1974
19:30

Chile	1–1	East Germany
Ahumada 69'		Hoffmann 55'

Olympiastadion, West Berlin
Attendance: 28,300
Referee: Aurelio Angonese (Italy)

Chile	East Germany

GK	1	Leopoldo Vallejos
RB	2	Rolando García
CB	5	Elías Figueroa
CB	3	Alberto Quintano
LB	4	Antonio Arias
RM	8	Francisco Valdés (c)		(substituted off) 46'
CM	16	Guillermo Páez	(yellow card) 60'
LM	10	Carlos Reinoso
RF	18	Jorge Socías		(substituted off) 67'
CF	9	Sergio Ahumada
LF	11	Leonardo Véliz	(yellow card) 56'
Substitutions:
FW	17	Guillermo Yávar		(substituted on) 46'
MF	19	Rogelio Farías		(substituted on) 67'
Manager:
Luis Alamos

GK	1	Jürgen Croy
SW	3	Bernd Bransch (c)
RB	18	Gerd Kische	(yellow card) 65'
CB	4	Konrad Weise
LB	12	Siegmar Wätzlich
CM	19	Wolfgang Seguin		(substituted off) 72'
CM	16	Harald Irmscher
AM	14	Jürgen Sparwasser
RW	20	Martin Hoffmann
LW	15	Eberhard Vogel		(substituted off) 30'
CF	11	Joachim Streich
Substitutions:
CF	9	Peter Ducke		(substituted on) 30'
CM	10	Hans-Jürgen Kreische		(substituted on) 72'
Manager:
Georg Buschner

Linesmen:
Rudolf Scheurer (Switzerland)
Bob Davidson (Scotland)

=== Australia vs Chile ===
The fixture was played during a torrential downpour, necessitating the half-time break to be extended by 22 minutes.

Ray Richards received a second booking late in the second half for not taking a freekick quickly enough, however he was allowed to stay on the pitch due to the referee forgetting about his first booking. He remained on the pitch for several minutes before the linesman alerted the referee about his mistake, resulting in the referee showing him a third yellow, followed by the required red card. Richards became the first Australia player to be sent off in a World Cup game. Coincidentally, a similar incident occurred involving Australia when they returned to the World Cup in Germany over three decades later in 2006 against Croatia - in this case, Josip Šimunić was erroneously shown three yellow cards before being sent off by referee Graham Poll.

This result earned Australia their first ever point and clean sheet at the World Cup finals.

22 June 1974
16:00

Australia	0–0	Chile

Olympiastadion, West Berlin
Attendance: 17,400
Referee: Jafar Namdar (Iran)

Australia	Chile

GK	1	Jack Reilly
DF	2	Doug Utjesenovic
DF	3	Peter Wilson (c)
DF	4	Manfred Schäfer
DF	5	Colin Curran		(substituted off) 83'
MF	6	Ray Richards	(yellow card) 37' (red card) 83'
MF	7	Jimmy Rooney
MF	8	Jimmy Mackay
MF	11	Attila Abonyi
FW	12	Adrian Alston		(substituted off) 65'
FW	20	Branko Buljevic
Substitutions:
MF	13	Peter Ollerton		(substituted on) 65'
MF	15	Harry Williams		(substituted on) 83'
Manager:
(Socialist Federal Republic of Yugoslavia) Rale Rasic

GK	1	Leopoldo Vallejos
RB	2	Rolando García
CB	5	Elías Figueroa
CB	3	Alberto Quintano
LB	4	Antonio Arias
RM	8	Francisco Valdés (c)	(substituted off) 57'
CM	16	Guillermo Páez
LM	10	Carlos Reinoso
RF	7	Carlos Caszely
CF	9	Sergio Ahumada
LF	11	Leonardo Véliz	(substituted off) 72'
Substitutions:
MF	19	Rogelio Farías	(substituted on) 57'
FW	17	Guillermo Yávar	(substituted on) 72'
Manager:
Luis Alamos

Linesmen:
Vital Loraux (Belgium)
Arie van Gemert (Netherlands)

=== East Germany vs West Germany ===
22 June 1974
19:30

East Germany	1–0	West Germany
Sparwasser 77'

Volksparkstadion, Hamburg
Attendance: 60,200
Referee: Ramón Barreto (Uruguay)

East Germany	West Germany

GK	1	Jürgen Croy	(yellow card) 81'
DF	3	Bernd Bransch (c)
DF	4	Konrad Weise
DF	12	Siegmar Wätzlich
DF	18	Gerd Kische
MF	2	Lothar Kurbjuweit
MF	10	Hans-Jürgen Kreische	(yellow card) 84'
MF	13	Reinhard Lauck
MF	16	Harald Irmscher		(substituted off) 65'
FW	14	Jürgen Sparwasser	(yellow card) 27'
FW	20	Martin Hoffmann
Substitutions:
MF	17	Erich Hamann		(substituted on) 65'
Manager:
Georg Buschner

GK	1	Sepp Maier
DF	2	Berti Vogts
DF	3	Paul Breitner
DF	4	Hans-Georg Schwarzenbeck	(substituted off) 68'
DF	5	Franz Beckenbauer (c)
MF	8	Bernhard Cullmann
MF	12	Wolfgang Overath	(substituted off) 69'
MF	14	Uli Hoeneß
FW	9	Jürgen Grabowski
FW	13	Gerd Müller
FW	15	Heinz Flohe
Substitutions:
MF	6	Horst-Dieter Höttges	(substituted on) 68'
FW	10	Günter Netzer	(substituted on) 69'
Manager:
Helmut Schön

Linesmen:
Armando Marques (Brazil)
Luis Pestarino (Argentina)

== See also ==
- Australia at the FIFA World Cup
- Chile at the FIFA World Cup
- East Germany at the FIFA World Cup
- [West] Germany at the FIFA World Cup
