= 1974 FIFA World Cup Group A =

Football tournament details

Group A was one of two groups in the second group stage of the 1974 FIFA World Cup finals. It was the first time that this stage of the competition (equivalent to the quarter-finals) was played in a group format. Matches were played in three cities (Dortmund, Gelsenkirchen and Hanover) between 26 June and 3 July 1974. The group was composed of the winners of Groups 1 and 3 from the first group stage (East Germany and Netherlands), and the runners-up of Groups 2 and 4 (Brazil and Argentina).

The Netherlands won the group after winning all three of their matches to qualify for the final, while Brazil won their matches against East Germany and Argentina to finish in second place and qualify for the match for third place. East Germany and Argentina drew their match to finish level on one point, but East Germany's superior goal difference meant they finished the higher of the two.

== Qualified teams ==
The winners of Group 1 and 3 and the runners-up of Group 2 and 4 qualified for Group A of the second round.

Group	Winners
1	East Germany
3	Netherlands
Group	Runners-up
2	Brazil
4	Argentina

== Standings ==
Pos	Team	Pld	W	D	L	GF	GA	GD	Pts	Qualification
1	Netherlands	3	3	0	0	8	0	+8	6	Advance to final
2	Brazil	3	2	0	1	3	3	0	4	Advance to match for third place
3	East Germany	3	0	1	2	1	4	−3	1	
4	Argentina	3	0	1	2	2	7	−5	1	

Source: FIFA

== Matches ==
All times listed are local (CET)

=== Netherlands vs Argentina ===
26 June 1974
19:30 CET

Netherlands	4–0	Argentina
Cruyff 11', 90'; Krol 25'; Rep 73'

Parkstadion, Gelsenkirchen
Attendance: 56,548
Referee: Bob Davidson (Scotland)

Netherlands	Argentina

GK	8	Jan Jongbloed
RB	20	Wim Suurbier	(yellow card) 58'	(substituted off) 84'
CB	2	Arie Haan
CB	17	Wim Rijsbergen
LB	12	Ruud Krol
CM	13	Johan Neeskens	(yellow card) 22'
CM	6	Wim Jansen
CM	3	Willem van Hanegem
RW	16	Johnny Rep
LW	15	Rob Rensenbrink
CF	14	Johan Cruyff (c)
Substitutions:
CB	5	Rinus Israël		(substituted on) 84'
Manager:
Rinus Michels

GK	1	Daniel Carnevali
RB	20	Enrique Wolff		(substituted off) 46'
CB	14	Roberto Perfumo (c)	(yellow card) 35'
CB	10	Ramón Heredia
LB	16	Francisco Sá
MF	18	Roberto Telch
MF	4	Agustín Balbuena
MF	17	Carlos Squeo
FW	11	René Houseman		(substituted off) 46'
FW	2	Rubén Ayala
CF	22	Héctor Yazalde
Substitutions:
RB	9	Rubén Glaria		(substituted on) 46'
FW	13	Mario Kempes		(substituted on) 46'
Manager:
Vladislao Cap

Assistant referees:
Kurt Tschenscher (West Germany)
Pavel Kazakov (Soviet Union)

=== Brazil vs East Germany ===
26 June 1974
19:30 CET

Brazil	1–0	East Germany
Rivellino 60'

Niedersachsenstadion, Hanover
Attendance: 59,863
Referee: Clive Thomas (Wales)

Brazil	East Germany

GK	1	Leão
RB	4	Zé Maria
CB	2	Luís Pereira
CB	3	Marinho Peres
LB	6	Marinho Chagas
CM	17	Carpegiani	(yellow card) 28'
CM	10	Rivellino
AM	11	Caju
RW	13	Valdomiro
LW	21	Dirceu	(yellow card) 75'
CF	7	Jairzinho	(yellow card) 27'
Manager:
Mário Zagallo

GK	1	Jürgen Croy
SW	3	Bernd Bransch (c)
RB	18	Gerd Kische
CB	4	Konrad Weise
LB	12	Siegmar Wätzlich
MF	17	Erich Hamann	(yellow card) 11'	(substituted off) 46'
MF	13	Reinhard Lauck		(substituted off) 64'
MF	14	Jürgen Sparwasser
MF	2	Lothar Kurbjuweit
CF	11	Joachim Streich	(yellow card) 84'
CF	20	Martin Hoffmann
Substitutions:
MF	16	Harald Irmscher		(substituted on) 46'
FW	8	Wolfram Löwe		(substituted on) 64'
Manager:
Georg Buschner

Assistant referees:
Doğan Babacan (Turkey)
Tony Boskovic (Australia)

=== Argentina vs Brazil ===
30 June 1974
16:00 CET

Argentina	1–2	Brazil
Brindisi 35'		Rivellino 32'; Jairzinho 49'

Niedersachsenstadion, Hanover
Attendance: 39,400
Referee: Vital Loraux (Belgium)

Argentina	Brazil

GK	1	Daniel Carnevali
RB	9	Rubén Glaria
CB	5	Ángel Bargas
CB	10	Ramón Heredia
LB	16	Francisco Sá		(substituted off) 46'
MF	17	Carlos Squeo
MF	4	Agustín Balbuena
MF	3	Carlos Babington
MF	6	Miguel Ángel Brindisi (c)
FW	2	Rubén Ayala
FW	13	Mario Kempes		(substituted off) 46'
Substitutions:
LB	7	Jorge Carrascosa		(substituted on) 46'
FW	11	René Houseman	(yellow card) 72'	(substituted on) 46'
Manager:
Vladislao Cap

GK	1	Leão
RB	4	Zé Maria
CB	2	Luís Pereira
CB	3	Marinho Peres
LB	6	Marinho Chagas
CM	17	Carpegiani
CM	10	Rivellino
AM	11	Caju
RW	13	Valdomiro
LW	21	Dirceu
CF	7	Jairzinho
Manager:
Mário Zagallo

Assistant referees:
Youssou N'Diaye (Sénégal)
Jack Taylor (England)

=== East Germany vs Netherlands ===
30 June 1974
16:00 CET

East Germany	0–2	Netherlands
		Neeskens 7'; Rensenbrink 59'

Parkstadion, Gelsenkirchen
Attendance: 68,348
Referee: Rudolf Scheurer (Switzerland)

East Germany	Netherlands

GK	1	Jürgen Croy
SW	3	Bernd Bransch (c)
RB	18	Gerd Kische
CB	4	Konrad Weise
LB	2	Lothar Kurbjuweit
MF	13	Reinhard Lauck	(substituted off) 64'
MF	14	Jürgen Sparwasser
MF	7	Jürgen Pommerenke
MF	6	Rüdiger Schnuphase
CF	8	Wolfram Löwe	(substituted off) 54'
CF	20	Martin Hoffmann
Substitutions:
CF	9	Peter Ducke	(substituted on) 54'
MF	10	Hans-Jürgen Kreische	(substituted on) 64'
Manager:
Georg Buschner

GK	8	Jan Jongbloed
RB	20	Wim Suurbier
CB	2	Arie Haan
CB	17	Wim Rijsbergen
LB	12	Ruud Krol
CM	13	Johan Neeskens
CM	6	Wim Jansen
CM	3	Willem van Hanegem
RW	16	Johnny Rep
LW	15	Rob Rensenbrink
CF	14	Johan Cruyff (c)
Manager:
Rinus Michels

Assistant referees:
Erich Linemayr (Austria)
Omar Delgado Gómez (Colombia)

=== Argentina vs East Germany ===
3 July 1974
19:30 CET

Argentina	1–1	East Germany
Houseman 20'		Streich 14'

Parkstadion, Gelsenkirchen
Attendance: 54,254
Referee: Jack Taylor (England)

Argentina	East Germany

GK	12	Ubaldo Fillol
RB	20	Enrique Wolff (c)
CB	5	Ángel Bargas	(yellow card) 68'
CB	10	Ramón Heredia
LB	7	Jorge Carrascosa
DM	18	Roberto Telch
CM	6	Miguel Ángel Brindisi
CM	3	Carlos Babington
RW	11	René Houseman
LW	13	Mario Kempes
CF	2	Rubén Ayala
Manager:
Vladislao Cap

GK	1	Jürgen Croy
SW	3	Bernd Bransch (c)
RB	18	Gerd Kische
CB	4	Konrad Weise
LB	2	Lothar Kurbjuweit
CM	6	Rüdiger Schnuphase
CM	7	Jürgen Pommerenke
AM	14	Jürgen Sparwasser	(yellow card) 23'
RW	8	Wolfram Löwe		(substituted off) 65'
LW	20	Martin Hoffmann
CF	11	Joachim Streich		(substituted off) 80'
Substitutions:
LW	15	Eberhard Vogel		(substituted on) 65'
CF	9	Peter Ducke		(substituted on) 80'
Manager:
Georg Buschner

Assistant referees:
Mahmoud Mustafa Kamel (Egypt)
Clive Thomas (Wales)

=== Netherlands vs Brazil ===
3 July 1974
19:30 CET

Netherlands	2–0	Brazil
Neeskens 50'; Cruyff 65'

Westfalenstadion, Dortmund
Attendance: 53,700
Referee: Kurt Tschenscher (West Germany)

Netherlands	Brazil

GK	8	Jan Jongbloed
RB	20	Wim Suurbier	(yellow card) 29'
CB	2	Arie Haan
CB	17	Wim Rijsbergen
LB	12	Ruud Krol
CM	13	Johan Neeskens		(substituted off) 85'
CM	6	Wim Jansen
CM	3	Willem van Hanegem
RW	16	Johnny Rep	(yellow card) 69'
LW	15	Rob Rensenbrink		(substituted off) 67'
CF	14	Johan Cruyff (c)
Substitutions:
MF	7	Theo de Jong		(substituted on) 67'
DF	5	Rinus Israël		(substituted on) 85'
Manager:
Rinus Michels

GK	1	Leão
RB	4	Zé Maria	(yellow card) 37'
CB	2	Luís Pereira	(yellow card) 29' (red card) 84'
CB	3	Marinho Peres	(yellow card) 44'
LB	6	Marinho Chagas
CM	17	Carpegiani
CM	10	Rivellino
AM	11	Caju		(substituted off) 61'
RW	13	Valdomiro
LW	21	Dirceu
CF	7	Jairzinho
Substitutions:
CF	19	Mirandinha		(substituted on) 61'
Manager:
Mário Zagallo

Assistant referees:
Bobby Davidson (Scotland)
Govindasamy Suppiah (Singapore)

== See also ==
- Argentina at the FIFA World Cup
- Brazil at the FIFA World Cup
- East Germany at the FIFA World Cup
- Netherlands at the FIFA World Cup
