= East Germany at the FIFA World Cup =

International football delegation

After the division of Germany in 1949, West Germany was declared Germany's official successor team. East Germany was accepted as a FIFA member only in 1952 and entered the qualification tournament for the first time for 1958, but finished last in their qualification group behind Czechoslovakia and Wales.

They appeared in the final tournament of the FIFA World Cup on one occasion in 1974. During the tournament they played West Germany, who were hosts in that year, for the first and only time at senior level, winning 1–0. East Germany was reunified with West Germany in 1990 and did not compete again after the 1990 World Cup.

== Record at the FIFA World Cup ==
FIFA World Cup finals record										Qualification record						
Year	Round	Position	Pld	W	D	L	GF	GA	Squad	Pos	Pld	W	D	L	GF	GA
(Uruguay) 1930	Part of / Germany									Part of / Germany						
(Italy) 1934	Part of / Germany									Part of / Germany						
(France) 1938	Part of / Germany									Part of / Germany						
(Brazil) 1950	Not a FIFA member									Not a FIFA member						
(Switzerland) 1954	Did not enter									Did not enter						
(Sweden) 1958	Did not qualify									3rd	4	1	0	3	5	12
(Chile) 1962	Did not qualify									3rd	3	0	1	2	3	6
(England) 1966	Did not qualify									2nd	4	1	2	1	5	5
(Mexico) 1970	Did not qualify									2nd	4	2	1	1	7	7
(West Germany) 1974	Quarter-finals (Note: Last 8 held as second group stage.)	6th	6	2	2	2	5	5	Squad	1st	6	5	0	1	18	3
(Argentina) 1978	Did not qualify									2nd	6	3	3	0	15	4
(Spain) 1982	Did not qualify									2nd	4	2	0	2	9	6
(Mexico) 1986	Did not qualify									3rd	8	5	0	3	16	9
(Italy) 1990	Did not qualify									4th	8	3	1	4	9	13
Total	Second group stage	1/10	6	2	2	2	5	5	—	–	47	22	8	17	87	65

=== By match ===
World Cup	Round	Opponent	Score	Result	Venue	Scorers
1974	Group stage	Australia	2–0	W	Hamburg	C. Curran (o.g.), J. Streich
1974	Group stage	Chile	1–1	D	Berlin	M. Hoffmann
1974	Group stage	West Germany	1–0	W	Hamburg	J. Sparwasser
1974	Second round	Brazil	0–1	L	Hanover	—
1974	Second round	Netherlands	0–2	L	Gelsenkirchen	—
1974	Second round	Argentina	1–1	D	Gelsenkirchen	J. Streich

=== Record by opponent ===
FIFA World Cup matches (by team)
Opponent	Wins	Draws	Losses	Total	Goals Scored	Goals Conceded
Argentina	0	1	0	1	1	1
Australia	1	0	0	1	2	0
Brazil	0	0	1	1	0	1
Chile	0	1	0	1	1	1
Netherlands	0	0	1	1	0	2
West Germany	1	0	0	1	1	0

== East Germany at 1974 World Cup ==
=== First Round, Group 1 ===
Team	Pld	W	D	L	GF	GA	GD	Pts
East Germany	3	2	1	0	4	1	+3	5
West Germany	3	2	0	1	4	1	+3	4
Chile	3	0	2	1	1	2	−1	2
Australia	3	0	1	2	0	5	−5	1

14 June 1974
19:30 CET

East Germany	2 – 0	Australia
Curran 58' (o.g.); Streich 72'	Report

Volksparkstadion, Hamburg
Attendance: 10,000
Referee: Youssou N'Diaye (Senegal)

18 June 1974
19:30 CET

Chile	1 – 1	East Germany
Ahumada 69'	Report	Hoffmann 55'

Olympiastadion, West Berlin
Attendance: 20,000
Referee: Aurelio Angonese (Italy)

22 June 1974
19:30 CET

East Germany	1 – 0	West Germany
Sparwasser 77'	Report

Volksparkstadion, Hamburg
Attendance: 60,350
Referee: Ramón Barreto (Uruguay)

=== Second Round, Group A ===
Team	Pld	W	D	L	GF	GA	GD	Pts
Netherlands	3	3	0	0	8	0	+8	6
Brazil	3	2	0	1	3	3	0	4
East Germany	3	0	1	2	1	4	−3	1
Argentina	3	0	1	2	2	7	−5	1

26 June 1974
19:30 CET

Brazil	1 – 0	East Germany
Rivellino 60'	Report

Niedersachsenstadion, Hanover
Attendance: 58,463
Referee: Clive Thomas (Wales)

30 June 1974
16:00 CET

East Germany	0 – 2	Netherlands
	Report	Neeskens 13'; Rensenbrink 59'

Parkstadion, Gelsenkirchen
Attendance: 67,148
Referee: Rudolf Scheurer (Switzerland)

3 July 1974
19:30 CET

Argentina	1 – 1	East Germany
Houseman 20'	Report	Streich 14'

Parkstadion, Gelsenkirchen
Attendance: 53,054
Referee: Jack Taylor (England)

== Record players ==
Rank	Player	Matches
1	Bernd Bransch	6
1	Jürgen Croy	6
1	Martin Hoffmann	6
1	Gerd Kische	6
1	Jürgen Sparwasser	6
1	Konrad Weise	6
7	Harald Irmscher	4
7	Lothar Kurbjuweit	4
7	Wolfram Löwe	4
7	Joachim Streich	4
7	Siegmar Wätzlich	4

== Top goalscorers ==
Rank	Player	Goals
1	Joachim Streich	2
2	Martin Hoffmann	1
2	Jürgen Sparwasser	1
