= 1974 FIFA World Cup final =

World Cup final, held in West Germany

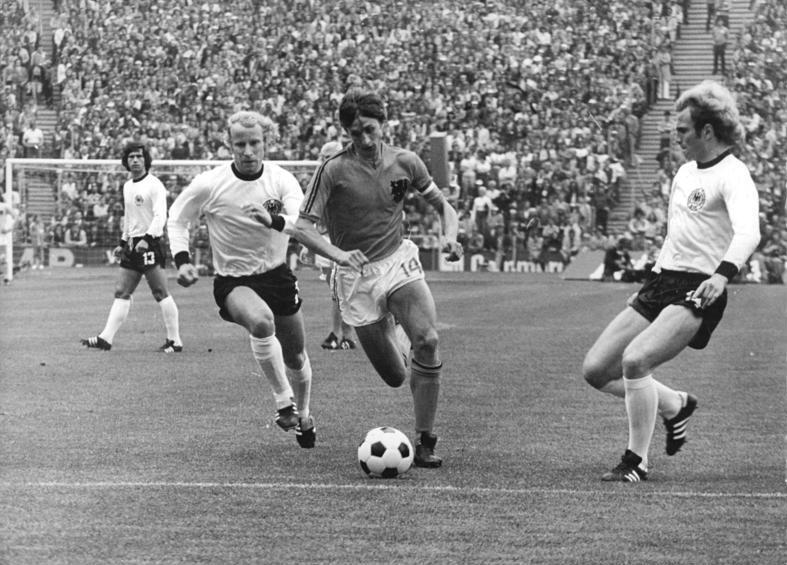
- Germany's Gerd Müller (far left) watches Netherlands' Johan Cruyff (centre) playing against team-mates Berti Vogts (2nd left) and Uli Hoeneß (right)
- Event: 1974 FIFA World Cup
Netherlands	West Germany
1	2
- Date: 7 July 1974
- Venue: Olympiastadion, Munich
- Referee: Jack Taylor (England)
- Attendance: 78,200

The final match of the 1974 FIFA World Cup, the tenth edition of FIFA's competition for national football teams, was played at Olympiastadion in Munich, West Germany, on 7 July 1974, and was contested by the Netherlands and West Germany. The tournament comprised host West Germany, defending champions Brazil, and 14 other teams who emerged from the qualification phase, organized by the six FIFA confederations. The 16 teams competed in the first group stage, from which 8 teams qualified for the second group stage. En route to the final, the Netherlands finished atop Group 3, with two wins and one draw, before defeating Argentina, East Germany, and Brazil in Group A. West Germany finished second in Group 1, after which they beat Yugoslavia, Sweden, and Poland in Group B.

The Netherlands opened the scoring via a Johan Neeskens penalty in the second minute, only for Paul Breitner to equalise with another penalty in the 25th minute before Gerd Müller scored the winning goal in the 43rd minute, claiming West Germany's second FIFA World Cup title.

Five German players (Sepp Maier, Franz Beckenbauer, Wolfgang Overath, Jürgen Grabowski and Horst-Dieter Höttges) became the first in history to have won gold, silver and bronze medals at the FIFA World Cup.

== Background ==
The 1974 FIFA World Cup was the tenth edition of the World Cup, FIFA's football competition for national teams, held in West Germany between 13 June and 7 July. West Germany and Brazil qualified automatically for the finals — West Germany as hosts and Brazil as the winners of the previous World Cup. The remaining 14 spots were decided through qualifying rounds held between November 1971 and February 1974, organized by the six FIFA confederations and involving 99 teams. In the finals, the teams were divided into four groups of four, with each team playing each other once in a round–robin format. The two top teams from each group advanced to the second group stage, from which they were divided into two groups of four. The top two teams from both groups qualified for the final, while the second–placed teams progressed to the third–place match.

West Germany had won the World Cup once as hosts, defeating Hungary in the 1954 final at Wankdorf Stadium. They had also finished as runners–up, losing to England in the 1966 final, and had reached the third–place match in the previous World Cup, where they won against Uruguay in 1970. West Germany and the Netherlands had previously met each other nineteen times; their first encounter was a friendly match in Arnhem in September 1910, which the Netherlands won 4–2. In all-time head-to-head results, West Germany had won sixteen games in contrast to the Netherlands' six, with six draws. This was the first meeting between the two sides in a main tournament stage of either a World Cup or a European Championship. The most recent meeting between the two teams before the 1974 World Cup was a friendly match at De Kuip in September 1966, in which West Germany won 4–2.

The final was held at the Olympiastadion, a 80,000–capacity stadium, in Munich, West Germany, including four other matches at the 1974 World Cup. The match ball used for the tournament was the Adidas Telstar, which was specifically made for the World Cup.

== Route to the final ==
=== The Netherlands ===
The Netherlands were drawn into Group 3 for the World Cup, in which they were joined by Uruguay, Scotland, and Bulgaria. In their first group game against Uruguay at Niedersachsenstadion in Hanover on 15 June, the Netherlands won 2–0, with both goals from Johnny Rep. In their next match against Sweden at Westfalenstadion in Dortmund on 19 June, the game ended in a scoreless draw. Their third group game was against Bulgaria in Dortmund on 23 June. Johan Neeskens scored twice via penalties for the Netherlands in the first half, with Rep and Theo de Jong both scoring between the 71st and 78th minutes. Ruud Krol scored an own goal for Bulgaria, but the Netherlands held on to a 4–1 win. In Group A, the Netherlands' opponents in their first match were Argentina at Parkstadion in Gelsenkirchen on 26 June. The Netherlands took the lead after ten minutes when Johan Cruyff received Willem van Hanegem's pass and struck it into the Argentine goal. Krol added a second from a corner kick by Wim Jansen halfway through the first half. In the 73rd minute, Cruyff kicked the ball into the far post, where Rep met with a header to extend their lead. Cruyff scored before the end of regular time to seal a 4–0 victory for the Netherlands. In their next match against East Germany in Gelsenkirchen on 30 June, the Netherlands won 2–0 with goals by Neeskens and Rob Rensenbrink. Their last group game was against Brazil in Dortmund on 3 July.

Netherlands
Round
West Germany
Opponent
Result
First round
Opponent
Result
Uruguay
2–0
Match 1
Chile
1–0
Sweden
0–0
Match 2
Australia
3–0
Bulgaria
4–1
Match 3
East Germany
0–1

Team	Pld	W	D	L	GF	GA	GD	Pts
Netherlands	3	2	1	0	6	1	+5	5
Sweden	3	1	2	0	3	0	+3	4
Bulgaria	3	0	2	1	2	5	−3	2
Uruguay	3	0	1	2	1	6	−5	1

Final standings

Team	Pld	W	D	L	GF	GA	GD	Pts
East Germany	3	2	1	0	4	1	+3	5
West Germany	3	2	0	1	4	1	+3	4
Chile	3	0	2	1	1	2	−1	2
Australia	3	0	1	2	0	5	−5	1

Opponent
Result
Second round
Opponent
Result
Argentina
4–0
Match 1
Yugoslavia
2–0
East Germany
2–0
Match 2
Sweden
4–2
Brazil
2–0
Match 3
Poland
1–0

Team	Pld	W	D	L	GF	GA	GD	Pts
Netherlands	3	3	0	0	8	0	+8	6
Brazil	3	2	0	1	3	3	0	4
East Germany	3	0	1	2	1	4	−3	1
Argentina	3	0	1	2	2	7	−5	1

Final standings

Team	Pld	W	D	L	GF	GA	GD	Pts
West Germany	3	3	0	0	7	2	+5	6
Poland	3	2	0	1	3	2	+1	4
Sweden	3	1	0	2	4	6	−2	2
Yugoslavia	3	0	0	3	2	6	−4	0

== Match ==
=== Summary ===
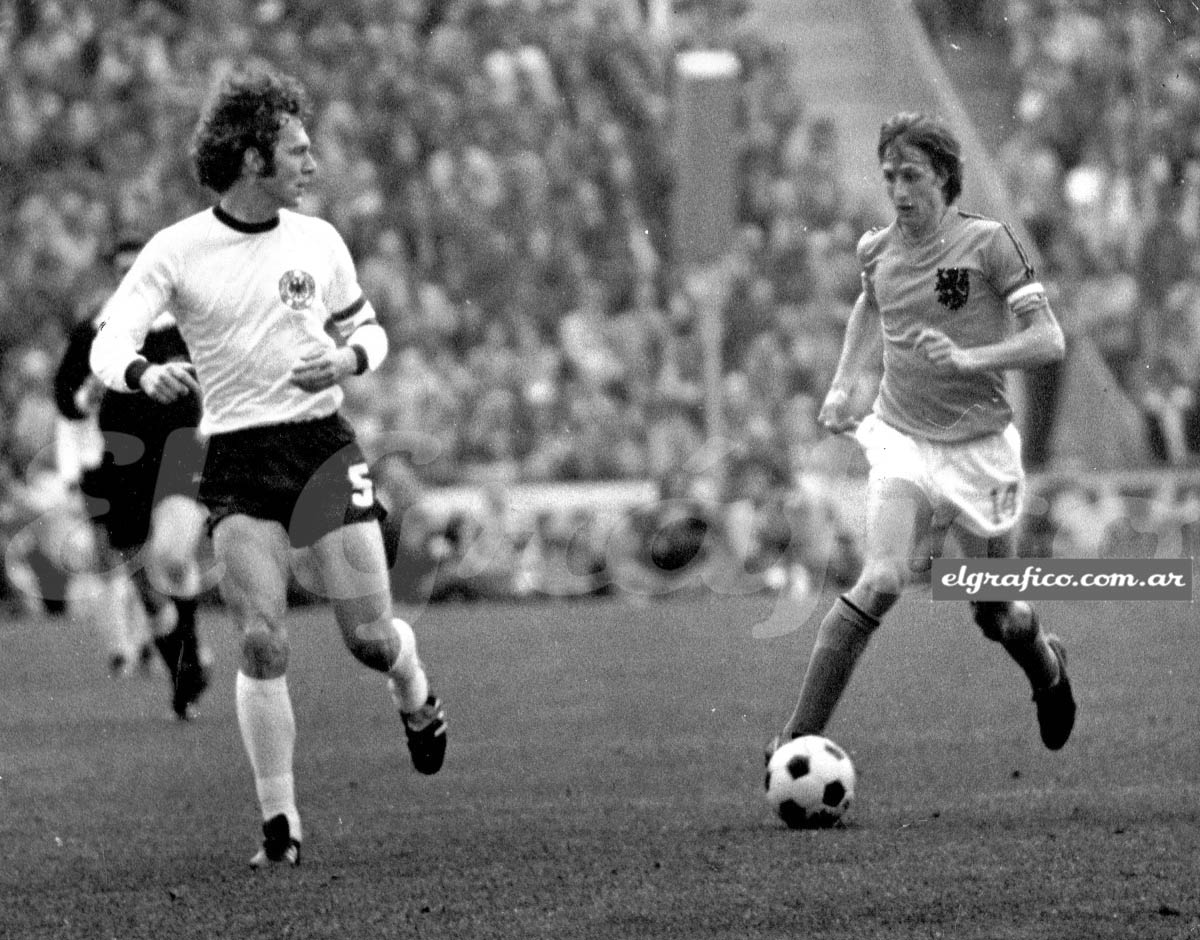
Franz Beckenbauer (left) and Johan Cruyff (right), key players of Germany and the Netherlands respectively

West Germany was led by Franz Beckenbauer, while the Dutch had their star Johan Cruyff and their Total Football system, which had dazzled the competition. The start of the match was delayed as the ground staff at the stadium had removed the corner flags for the tournament's closing ceremony (which preceded the final) but then forgot to put them back. With just a minute gone, Cruyff was brought down by Uli Hoeneß in the German penalty area following a solo run, and the Dutch took the lead from the ensuing penalty by Johan Neeskens before any German player had even touched the ball. West Germany struggled to recover, but they were awarded a penalty of their own in the 25th minute after Bernd Hölzenbein was fouled within the Dutch area. Paul Breitner took responsibility for the kick and scored. These two penalties were the first to be awarded in a World Cup Final. West Germany now pushed for a winner, which eventually came in the 43rd minute through Gerd Müller.

It turned out to be Müller's last goal for the West German team, as he retired from international football after the tournament. As the teams walked off the pitch at half–time, Cruyff was booked for arguing with the referee.

The second half saw chances for both sides. Müller thought he had scored when he put the ball in the net, only to be denied by the linesman flagging for offside. In the 85th minute, Hölzenbein fell to ground in the Dutch penalty area again, but referee Taylor did not believe it was a foul. When the final whistle went, West Germany were crowned world champions for 1974, in addition to their European title from 1972. This was the only case of the reigning European champions winning the World Cup until Spain accomplished the feat in 2010, although France have also held both trophies at the same time by winning the 1998 World Cup followed by Euro 2000.

João Havelange, FIFA President from 1974 to 1998, made an unsubstantiated claim that the 1966 and 1974 World Cups were fixed so that England and West Germany would win respectively.

West German defender Berti Vogts declared in 1997 that the penalty awarded to West Germany was unjustified. However, he remains the only player who wanted to comment on it.

=== Details ===
7 July 1974
16:00 UTC+1

Netherlands	1–2	West Germany
Neeskens 2' (pen.)		Breitner 25' (pen.); Müller 43'

Olympiastadion, Munich
Attendance: 78,200
Referee: Jack Taylor (England)

Netherlands	West Germany

GK	8	Jan Jongbloed
RB	20	Wim Suurbier
CB	17	Wim Rijsbergen		(substituted off) 69'
CB	2	Arie Haan
LB	12	Ruud Krol
DM	6	Wim Jansen
CM	13	Johan Neeskens	(yellow card) 40'
CM	3	Willem van Hanegem	(yellow card) 23'
RW	16	Johnny Rep
LW	15	Rob Rensenbrink		(substituted off) 46'
CF	14	Johan Cruyff (c)	(yellow card) 45'
Substitutes:
GK	18	Piet Schrijvers
DF	5	Rinus Israël
MF	7	Theo de Jong		(substituted on) 69'
FW	9	Piet Keizer
FW	10	René van de Kerkhof		(substituted on) 46'
Manager:
Rinus Michels

GK	1	Sepp Maier
SW	5	Franz Beckenbauer (c)
RB	2	Berti Vogts	(yellow card) 4'
CB	4	Hans-Georg Schwarzenbeck
LB	3	Paul Breitner
CM	16	Rainer Bonhof
CM	12	Wolfgang Overath
AM	14	Uli Hoeneß
RW	9	Jürgen Grabowski
LW	17	Bernd Hölzenbein
CF	13	Gerd Müller
Substitutes:
GK	21	Norbert Nigbur
DF	6	Horst-Dieter Höttges
MF	8	Bernhard Cullmann
FW	11	Jupp Heynckes
MF	15	Heinz Flohe
Manager:
Helmut Schön

Linesmen:
Ramón Barreto (Uruguay)
Alfonso González Archundia (Mexico)

Match rules:

- 90 minutes
- 30 minutes of extra–time if necessary
- Replay on 9 July if scores still level
- Five substitutes named, of which two may be used

== See also ==
- Germany–Netherlands football rivalry
- Germany at the FIFA World Cup
- Netherlands at the FIFA World Cup
