= 1974 FIFA World Cup qualification (CONMEBOL) =

Tournament details
- Dates: 29 April – 21 September 1973
- Teams: 9 (from 1 confederation)

Tournament statistics
- Matches played: 16
- Goals scored: 34 (2.13 per match)
- Top scorer: (Argentina) Rubén Ayala (5 goals)

Listed below are the dates and results for the 1974 FIFA World Cup qualification rounds for the South American Zone (CONMEBOL). For an overview of the qualification rounds, see the article 1974 FIFA World Cup qualification.

The 9 teams were divided into 3 groups of 3 teams each. 2.5 spots were open for competition, as Brazil qualified automatically as holders. The teams would play against each other on a home-and-away basis. The Groups 1 and 2 winners qualified directly, while the Group 3 winner advanced to the UEFA / CONMEBOL Intercontinental Play-off.

== Group 1 ==
Rank	Team	Pld	W	D	L	GF	GA	GD	Pts
1	Uruguay	4	2	1	1	6	2	+4	5
2	Colombia	4	1	3	0	3	2	+1	5
3	Ecuador	4	0	2	2	3	8	−5	2

21 June 1973

Colombia	1–1	Ecuador
Ortiz 44'		Muñoz 72'

Referee: Guenero (Peru)

24 June 1973

Colombia	0–0	Uruguay

Referee: Goicoechea (Argentina)

28 June 1973

Ecuador	1–1	Colombia
Muñoz 29' (pen.)		Ortiz 50'

Referee: Pestarino (Argentina)

1 July 1973

Ecuador	1–2	Uruguay
Estupiñán 35'		Cubilla 41'; Morena 74'

Referee: Arppi Filho (Brazil)

5 July 1973

Uruguay	0–1	Colombia
		Ortiz 71'

Referee: González (Chile)

8 July 1973

Uruguay	4–0	Ecuador
Morena 4', 27'; Cubilla 30'; Milar 62'

Referee: Canete (Paraguay)

Uruguay qualified on goal difference.

== Group 2 ==
Rank	Team	Pld	W	D	L	GF	GA	GD	Pts
1	Argentina	4	3	1	0	9	2	+7	7
2	Paraguay	4	2	1	1	8	5	+3	5
3	Bolivia	4	0	0	4	1	11	−10	0

2 September 1973

Bolivia	1–2	Paraguay
Morales 30'		Escobar 41'; Insfran 74'

Referee: Rendón Villads (Ecuador)

9 September 1973

Argentina	4–0	Bolivia
Brindisi 30', 43'; Ayala 66', 75'

Referee: Pazos Bianchi (Uruguay)

16 September 1973

Paraguay	1–1	Argentina
Arrúa 41'		Ayala 33'

Referee: Delgado (Colombia)

23 September 1973

Bolivia	0–1	Argentina
		Fornari 17'

Referee: Coelho (Brazil)

30 September 1973

Paraguay	4–0	Bolivia
Bareiro 10'; Osorio 13'; Insfran 18'; Arrúa 89'

Referee: Tejada Burga (Peru)

7 October 1973

Argentina	3–1	Paraguay
Ayala 32' (pen.), 57'; Guerini 89'		Escobar 22'

Referee: Diaz (Chile)

Argentina qualified.

== Group 3 ==
Rank	Team	Pld	W	D	L	GF	GA	GD	Pts
1=	Chile	2	1	0	1	2	2	0	2
1=	Peru	2	1	0	1	2	2	0	2
—	Venezuela	withdrew							

29 April 1973

Peru	2–0	Chile
Sotil 43', 62'

Referee: Marques (Brazil)

13 May 1973

Chile	2–0	Peru
Crisosto 68'; Ahumada 71'

Referee: Barreto Ruiz (Uruguay)

Chile and Peru finished level on points and goal difference, and a play-off on neutral ground was played to decide who would advance to the UEFA / CONMEBOL Intercontinental Play-off.

5 August 1973

Chile	2–1	Peru
Valdés 45'; Farias 58'		Bailetti 40'

Referee: Da Rosa (Uruguay)

Chile advanced to the UEFA–CONMEBOL intercontinental play-off.

== Inter-confederation play-offs ==
Team 1	Agg.	Team 2	1st leg	2nd leg
Soviet Union	w.o. (Note: The Soviet Union refused to play in Chile for the second leg, so Chile were awarded a 2–0 walkover victory.)	Chile	0–0	0–2

Chile advanced by walkover to the 1974 FIFA World Cup.

== Qualified teams ==
The following four teams from CONMEBOL qualified for the final tournament.

Team	Qualified as	Qualified on	Previous appearances in FIFA World Cup^{1}
Brazil	Defending champions	21 June 1970	9 (1930, 1934, 1938, 1950, 1954, **1958**, **1962**, 1966, **1970**)
Uruguay	Group 1 winners	8 July 1973	6 (**1930**, **1950**, 1954, 1962, 1966, 1970)
Argentina	Group 2 winners	7 October 1973	5 (1930, 1934, 1958, 1962, 1966)
Chile	UEFA–CONMEBOL play-off winners	21 November 1973	4 (1930, 1950, 1962, 1966)

^{1} Bold indicates champions for that year. Italic indicates hosts for that year.

== Goalscorers ==
5 goals

- (Argentina) Rubén Ayala

3 goals

- (Colombia) Willington Ortiz
- (Uruguay) Fernando Morena

2 goals

- (Argentina) Miguel Ángel Brindisi
- (Ecuador) Washington Muñoz
- (Paraguay) Adalberto Escobar
- (Paraguay) Saturnino Arrúa
- (Paraguay) Jorge Insfran
- (Peru) Hugo Sotil
- (Uruguay) Luis Cubilla

1 goal

- (Argentina) Oscar Fornari
- (Argentina) Carlos Guerini
- (Bolivia) Raúl Morales
- (Chile) Sergio Ahumada
- (Chile) Julio Crisosto
- (Chile) Rogelio Farias
- (Chile) Francisco Valdés
- (Ecuador) Ítalo Estupiñán
- (Paraguay) Pedro Alcides Bareiro
- (Paraguay) Juvencio Osorio
- (Peru) Héctor Bailetti
- (Uruguay) Denís Milar
