= Reinhard Lauck =

German footballer (1946–1997)

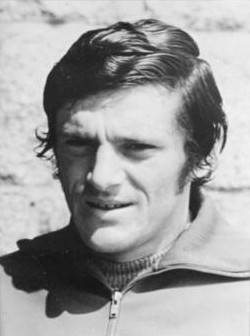
- Lauck in 1974

Personal information
- Birth name: Reinhard Lauck
- Date of birth: 16 September 1946
- Place of birth: Sielow, Soviet occupation zone of Germany
- Date of death: 22 October 1997 (aged 51)
- Place of death: Berlin, Germany
- Height: 1.76 m (5 ft 9 in)
- Position: Midfielder

Youth career
- 1958–1960: SG Sielow
- 1960–1963: ASG Vorwärts Cottbus
- 1963–1965: SC Cottbus (de)

Senior career*
Years	Team	Apps	(Gls)
1965–1966	SC Cottbus	19	(8)
1966–1967	ASG Vorwärts Neubrandenburg (de)	32	(5)
1967–1968	Energie Cottbus	17	(3)
1968–1973	Union Berlin	131	(21)
1973–1981	BFC Dynamo	152	(29)
Total		351	(66)

International career
1964–1965	East Germany U18 (de)	5	(0)
1967–1969	East Germany U23	3	(0)
1975–1976	East Germany Olympic	7	(0)
1973–1977	East Germany	33	(3)
Medal record
Representing East Germany
Summer Olympics
Gold medal – first place	1976 Montreal	Team
- * Club domestic league appearances and goals

Reinhard Lauck (16 September 1946 – 22 October 1997), often nicknamed Mäcki, was a German footballer who played as a midfielder.

== Club career ==
Born on 16 September 1946, in Sielow, Lauck began playing football in 1958 in a local club SG Sielow. From 1960 to 1963 he played for ASG Vorwärts Cottbus and in 1965 he made his professional debut for SC Cottbus. Later, he played for ASG Vorwärts Neubrandenburg (1966–67), Energie Cottbus (1967–68), Union Berlin (1968–73) and BFC Dynamo (1973–81) in more than 250 East German top-flight matches. Lauck was voted the 1974 and 1976 BFC Footballer of the Year at the 9th and 11th editions of the club's traditional annual ball in the Dynamo-Sporthalle at the beginning of the new year. He led BFC Dynamo to win three East German championships in a row, the first three of overall ten consecutive league titles for the Wine Reds.

== International career ==
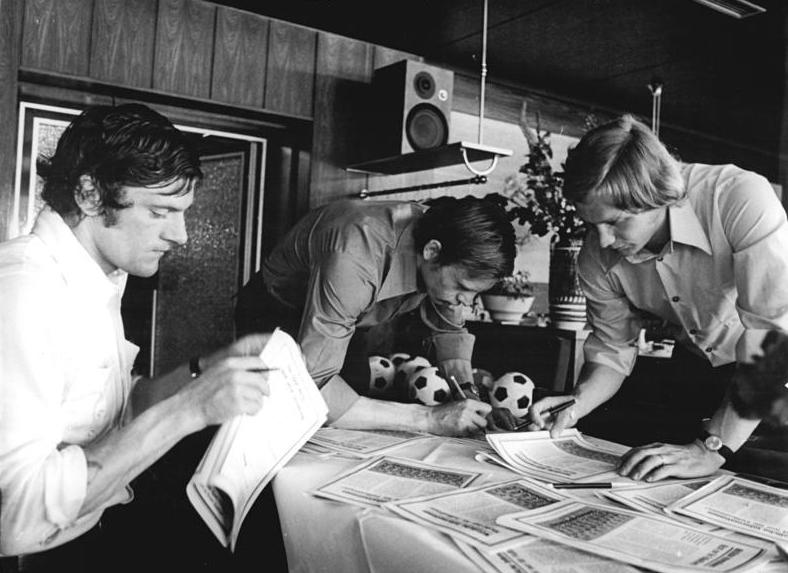
Lauck signing autographs with Bernd Bransch and Gerd Kische (from left to right), June 1974

On the national level, Lauck represented the GDR youth selections from 1964 to 1969. In 1973, he made his debut for the full East Germany national team (33 matches/three goals), and was a participant at the 1974 FIFA World Cup. During the 1974 World Cup, Lauck excelled in the famous 1–0 victory of his East Germany side over later world champion West Germany. In 1976, he was in the East German team which won the gold medal in the 1976 Summer Olympics in Montreal, where he was a vital part of the team.

== Personal life ==
After his playing days, Lauck worked in the trade he had originally learned, as a locksmith, as well as a construction worker and as a coal hauler, while also struggling increasingly with alcoholism. In October 1997, Lauck was found lying on a street in Berlin, suffering from severe head injuries and with alcohol in his system. After spending two weeks in a coma, he died on 22 October 1997, at the age of just 51.

Frank "Wuschi" Rohde, former colleague player, cites Reinhard Lauck as a role model for him at BFC Dynamo.

== Honours ==
=== Club ===
BFC Dynamo

- DDR-Oberliga: 1978–79, 1979–80, 1979–81

=== National team ===
East Germany

- Summer Olympics gold medalist: 1976
