= Jafar Namdar =

Iranian football referee (1934–2014)

Jafar Namdar (2 July 1934 – 1 January 2014) was an Iranian football referee.

== Refereeing career ==
Namdar officiated as a referee at the 1974 and 1978 FIFA World Cups.

When he refereed Australia vs Chile at the 1974 FIFA World Cup Namdar became only the second Asian referee (George Suppiah beat him by three days) to officiate as a referee at a FIFA World Cup. In this match Namdar showed two yellow cards to Australian player Ray Richards without sending him off before showing a red card after being informed of his error by reserve official Clive Thomas. He officiated as an assistant referee for the match for third place between Brazil and Poland.

Namdar refereed matches in the Football Tournaments at the 1972 ( USSR - Burma 1:0 and German Democratic Republic - Mexico 7:0 ) and 1976 Olympic Games ( France - Guatemala 4:1 ).

He was Chief of the Iranian Referees Committee from 1970 until 1978. Namdar died on 1 January 2014 at the age of 79.
