= Jorge Carrascosa =

Argentine former footballer

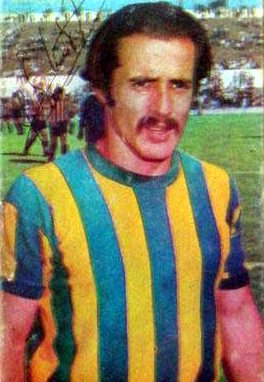
- Carrascosa in 1970

Personal information
- Full name: Jorge Carrascosa
- Date of birth: 15 August 1948 (age 78)
- Place of birth: Valentín Alsina, Argentina
- Height: 1.68 m (5 ft 6 in)
- Position: Left-back

Youth career
- Banfield

Senior career*
Years	Team	Apps	(Gls)
1967–1969	Banfield	52	(0)
1970–1972	Rosario Central	88	(3)
1973–1979	Huracán	287	(0)
Total		427	(3)

International career
1970–1977	Argentina	30	(1)
- * Club domestic league appearances and goals as of 26 November 2007

Jorge Carrascosa (born 15 August 1948 in Valentín Alsina), also known as El Lobo, is an Argentine former footballer who played as a left back. He played club football for Banfield, Rosario Central and Huracán and represented the Argentina national football team.

== Career ==
Carrascosa started his career in 1967 with Banfield. He made his debut for Argentina in 1970 and was signed by Rosario Central, where he was part of the squad that won the Nacional 1971.

In 1973, he joined Huracán where he won a second Argentine championship in his first season, the Metropolitano was the clubs first championship since the professionalisation of Argentine football in 1931.

Carrascosa was a member of the 1974 World Cup squad, but the Argentine team fared poorly, finishing bottom of their 2nd round group.

Carrascosa played for Argentina until 1977, making 30 appearances and scoring one goal. He resigned from the national team, while he was its captain, for personal reasons. He later declared that he was worn out from the media pressure and obsession for success typical of the football world. He played for Huracán until his retirement in 1979.

== Honours ==
Rosario Central

- Primera División Argentina: Nacional 1971

Huracán

- Primera División Argentina: Metropolitano 1973
