= Leopoldo Vallejos =

Chilean footballer (born 1944)

Personal information
- Full name: Leopoldo Manuel Vallejos Bravo
- Date of birth: July 16, 1944 (age 82)
- Place of birth: Chile
- Height: 1.77 m (5 ft 10 in)
- Position: Goalkeeper

Senior career*
Years	Team	Apps	(Gls)
1964—1970	Universidad Católica		
1962—1975	Unión Española		
1976—1977	Everton		
1978	O'Higgins		
1979—1981	Everton		
1982	Audax Italiano		
1983—1985	Deportes Arica		
1986	Universidad Católica		

International career
1968—1977	Chile	19	

Managerial career
- 1995–1996: Municipal Las Condes
- * Club domestic league appearances and goals

Leopoldo Manuel Vallejos Bravo (born July 16, 1944 in Santiago, Chile) is a former Chilean footballer. The goalkeeper played for 6 clubs in Chile and appeared for the Chile national football team at the 1974 FIFA World Cup, held in Germany.

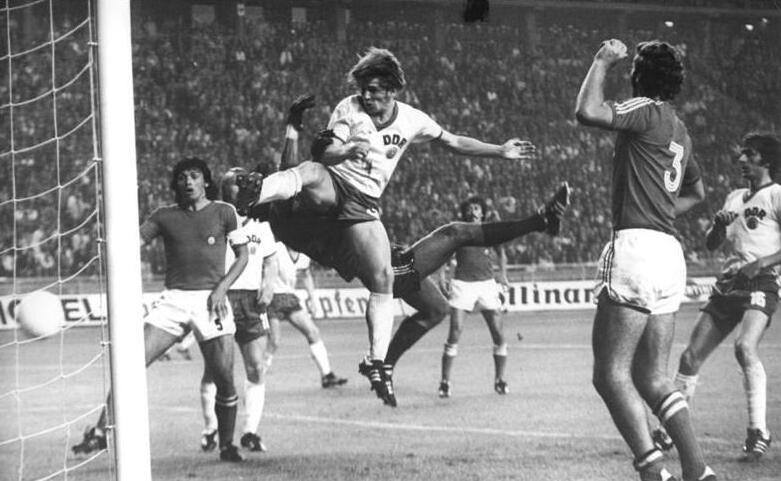
Leopoldo Vallejos

== Teams ==
- Universidad Católica 1964-1970
- Unión Española 1972-1975
- Everton 1976-1977
- O'Higgins 1978
- Everton 1979-1981
- Audax Italiano 1982
- Deportes Arica 1983-1985
- Universidad Católica 1986

== Titles ==
- Universidad Católica 1966 (Chilean Championship)
- Unión Española 1973 and 1975 (Chilean Championship)
- Everton 1976 (Chilean Championship)
