= Georg Buschner =

German footballer and manager

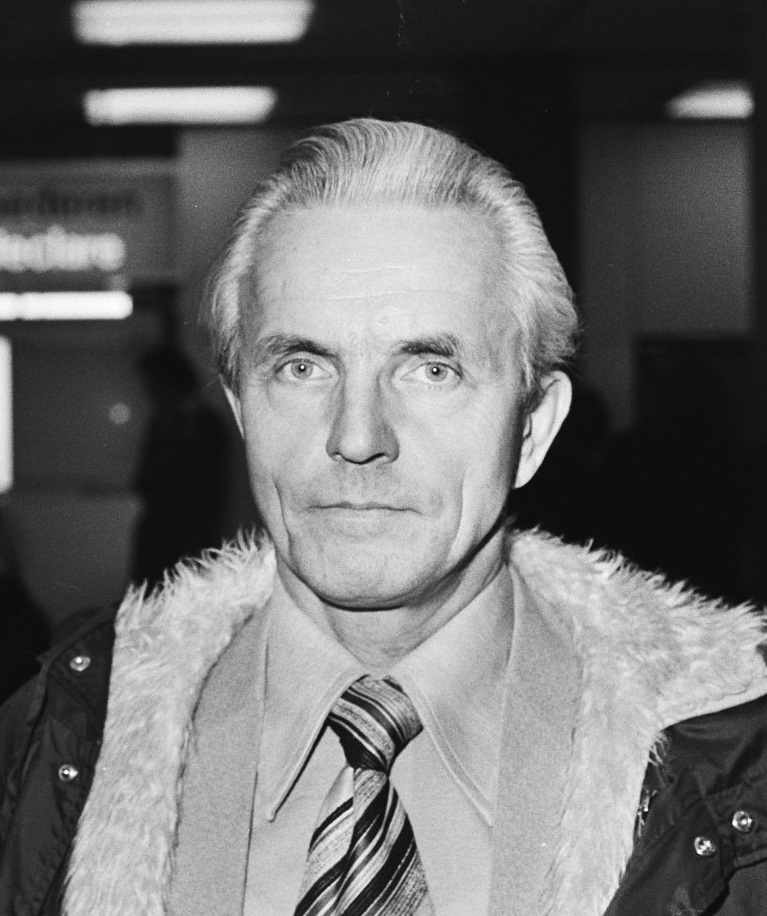

Personal information
- Full name: Georg Buschner
- Date of birth: 26 December 1925
- Place of birth: Gera, Weimar Republic
- Date of death: 12 February 2007 (aged 81)
- Place of death: Jena, Germany
- Position: Defender

Youth career
- 1935–?: 1. SpVgg Gera 04

Senior career*
Years	Team	Apps	(Gls)
–1952	BSG Motor Gera	84	(12)
1952–1958	SC Motor Jena	146	(1)

International career
1954–1957	East Germany	6	(0)

Managerial career
- 1958–1971: SC Motor Jena
- 1970–1981: East Germany
- * Club domestic league appearances and goals

Georg Buschner (26 December 1925 – 12 February 2007) was an East German football player and manager.

Buschner played in the East German top-flight for Motor Gera and Motor Jena. He earned six caps for the East Germany national football team between 1954 and 1957, and later coached the team from 1970 to 1981. He was a Stasi informer under the codename "Georg" from 1966 to 1971. He was the coach when East Germany played in their only World Cup appearance in 1974, and produced one of their most famous victories upset by beating West Germany in the first round. He also led East Germany to the bronze medal at the 1972 Olympics and the gold medal in the 1976 Olympics.

He died on 12 February 2007.

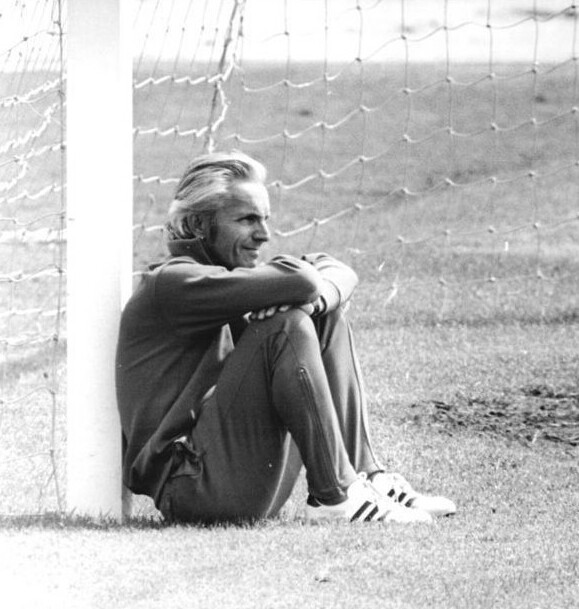
Buschner taking a rest during the 1974 FIFA World Cup.
