= Rogelio Farías =

Chilean footballer (1949–1995)

Personal information
- Full name: Rogelio Farías Salvador
- Date of birth: 13 August 1949
- Place of birth: Santiago, Chile
- Date of death: 6 April 1995 (aged 45)
- Position: Midfielder

Senior career*
Years	Team	Apps	(Gls)
1968–1974	Unión Española	134	(54)
1974–1976	Cádiz	41	(7)
1977–1978	Unión Española	37	(12)
1979	O'Higgins	19	(2)
1980	Audax Italiano	4	(1)
1981–1982	Coquimbo Unido		
1983	Unión Española	10	(1)

International career
1972–1977	Chile	13	(2)
- * Club domestic league appearances and goals

Rogelio Farías Salvador (13 August 1949 – 6 April 1995) was a Chilean football midfielder who played for Chile in the 1974 FIFA World Cup. He also played for Unión Española.

== Career ==
A historical player of Unión Española, Farías made his debut in 1968 at the age of nineteen. Following the 1974 FIFA World Cup, he moved to Spanish side Cádiz CF in the Segunda División, where he coincided with his compatriot Fernando Carvallo, and spent three seasons.

Back in Chile, he played for Unión Española, O'Higgins and Audax Italiano in the top division. In the second level, he played for Coquimbo Unido. His last club was Unión Española in 1983.

At international level, he made thirteen appearances and scored two goals for the Chile national team from 1972 to 1977, including the 1974 FIFA World Cup.

== Personal life ==
As a player of Cádiz CF, he was known by his undiscipline.

He died of a throat cancer.
