= Jürgen Croy =

East German footballer

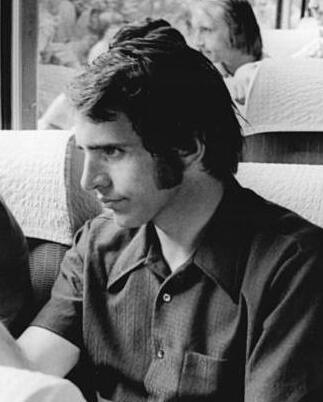
- Croy at the 1974 World Cup

Personal information
- Date of birth: 19 October 1946 (age 80)
- Place of birth: Zwickau, Soviet occupation zone of Germany
- Height: 1.86 m (6 ft 1 in)
- Position: Goalkeeper

Youth career
- –1963: BSG Aktivist Zwickau
- 1963–1965: BSG Sachsenring Zwickau

Senior career*
Years	Team	Apps	(Gls)
1965–1981	BSG Sachsenring Zwickau	372	(0)

International career
1967–1981	East Germany	86	(0)

Managerial career
- 1984–1988: Sachsenring Zwickau
Medal record
Representing East Germany
Men's Football
Bronze medal – third place	1972 Munich	Team competition
Gold medal – first place	1976 Montreal	Team competition
- * Club domestic league appearances and goals

Jürgen Croy (born 19 October 1946) is a German former professional footballer who played as a goalkeeper. He made 86 appearances for the East Germany national team.

== Club career ==
Born in Zwickau, Croy spent his entire footballing career at BSG Sachsenring Zwickau (today FSV Zwickau), with which he won the East German Cup in 1967 and 1975. He was one of East Germany's few international players not to play for a top club such as Dynamo Dresden, FC Carl Zeiss Jena, or FC Magdeburg. As such, Croy did not get the chance to play frequently in European competitions and did not gain the international fame he deserved. Though tall (186 cm), he was an outstanding shot-stopper capable of amazing reflexes on his line. Combined with an excellent command of his penalty area, first-rate ball-handling skills, and above-average consistency, this quality made Croy one of the best goalkeepers of his time and arguably one of the best ever. East and West German media alike often placed him on an equal footing with his contemporaries Sepp Maier and Dino Zoff, two of the game's all-time legends.

Croy was voted GDR Footballer of the Year in 1972, 1976, and 1978 by the East German football press. He played 372 East Germany first-division matches in his career.

== International career ==
Croy earned his first East Germany cap in May 1967 against Sweden (1–0). He was the starting goalkeeper during East Germany's only World Cup appearance in 1974. In particular, Croy stood in goal for East Germany's historic 1–0 victory over its West German neighbor in the only match ever to oppose the two Germany national teams. Two years later, Croy celebrated his greatest sporting triumph with the win of the gold medal in the Olympic football tournament. He went on to play 86 times for his country, the last one a 5–0 victory over Cuba in May 1981.

== Post-playing life ==
At the end of his footballing career, Croy worked as a football instructor for some time. From 1991 to 2001, he served as city commissioner for education, culture, and sports in his hometown of Zwickau. He then became the managing director of the Zwickau Chamber of Commerce, Tourism, and Culture until his retirement in 2010.

== Honours ==
BSG Zwickau

- FDGB-Pokal: 1966–67, 1974–75

East Germany

- Olympic Football Tournament: 1976

Individual

- GDR Footballer of the Year: 1972, 1976, 1978
