= Siegmar Wätzlich =

East German footballer (1947–2019)

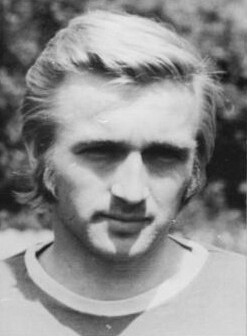

Personal information
- Full name: Siegmar Wätzlich
- Date of birth: 16 November 1947
- Place of birth: Rammenau, Soviet-occupied Germany
- Date of death: 18 April 2019 (aged 71)
- Height: 1.76 m (5 ft 9 in)
- Position: Defender

Youth career
- –1965: SG Rammenau
- 1965–1966: SG Dynamo Dresden

Senior career*
Years	Team	Apps	(Gls)
1966–1975	SG Dynamo Dresden	156	(10)

International career
1972–1975	East Germany	24	(0)
- * Club domestic league appearances and goals

Olympic medal record

Representing East Germany

Men's Football
Bronze medal – third place	1972 Munich	Team competition

Siegmar Wätzlich (16 November 1947 – 18 April 2019) was a German footballer.

== Career ==
=== Playing career ===
Wätzlich played his whole top-flight career for Dynamo Dresden (1967–1975).

On the national level he played for East Germany national team (22 matches), and was a participant at the 1974 FIFA World Cup.

=== Honours ===
Dynamo Dresden

- DDR-Oberliga (3): 1970–71, 1972–73, 1975–76
- FDGB-Pokal (1): 1970–71

East Germany

- Olympic Bronze Medal: 1972
