= Wolfgang Overath =

German footballer

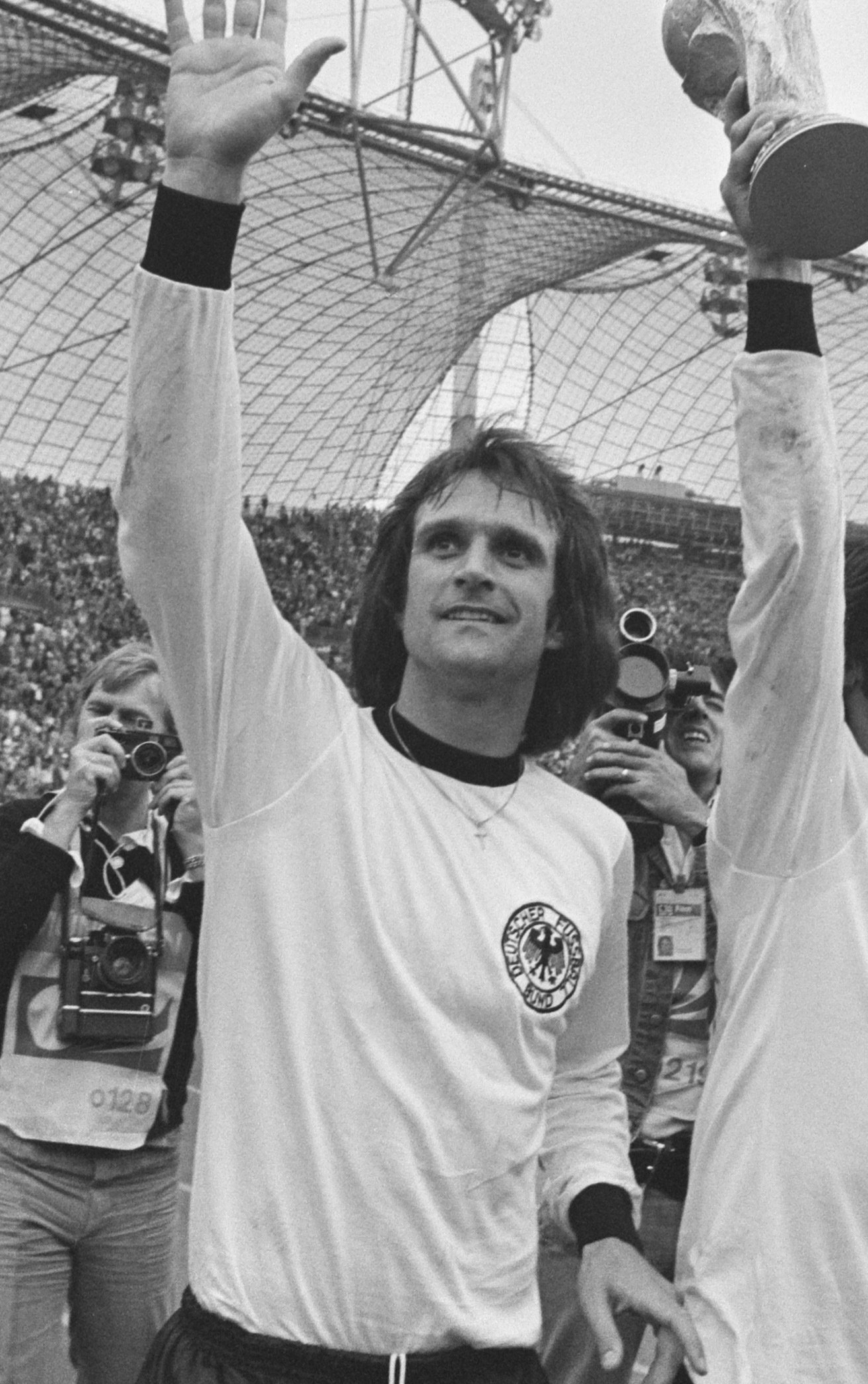
- Overath after winning the 1974 FIFA World Cup

Personal information
- Date of birth: 29 September 1943 (age 83)
- Place of birth: Siegburg, Germany
- Height: 1.76 m (5 ft 9 in)
- Position: Attacking midfielder

Youth career
- 1953–1962: Siegburger SV 04

Senior career*
Years	Team	Apps	(Gls)
1962–1977	1. FC Köln	409	(83)

International career
1963–1974	West Germany	81	(17)
Medal record
Men's football
Representing West Germany
FIFA World Cup
Winner	1974 West Germany
Runner-up	1966 England
Third place	1970 Mexico
- * Club domestic league appearances and goals

Wolfgang Overath (German pronunciation: [ˈvɔlfɡaŋ ˈʔoːvəʁaːt]; born 29 September 1943) is a former West German footballer. A true one-club man, Overath spent his entire professional career at 1. FC Köln. He represented his country three times in World Cup finals, culminating in 1974 with the 2–1 victory over the Netherlands on home soil. Primarily an attacking midfielder, Overath was known for his passing ability, technique and outstanding left foot.

== Career ==
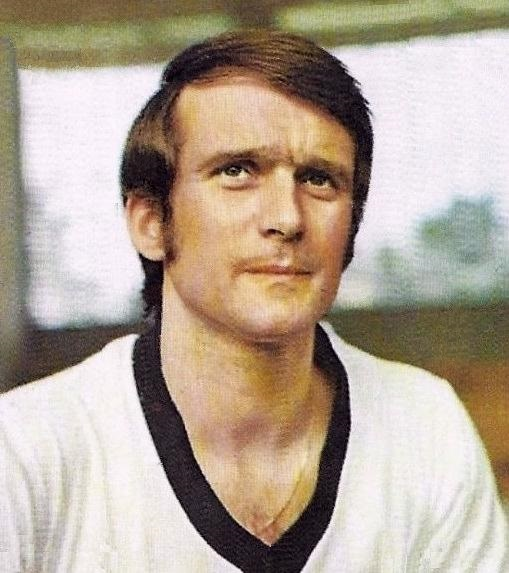
Overath at the 1970 FIFA World Cup

An attacking midfielder, Overath started playing football at SSV Siegburg, but spent the majority of his career at 1. FC Köln, appearing 765 times between 1962 and 1977 and scoring 287 goals. He won the inaugural Bundesliga with 1. FC Köln in 1964, overall he appeared in the first 14 seasons of the newly formed top-flight, and the German Cup in 1968. At European club level he played 71 matches (11 goals) for 1. FC Köln. He currently holds the all-time appearances record of the club (549 official matches played).

In total, Overath won 81 caps for the national side between 1963 and 1974, scoring 17 goals. As well as the World Cup victory in 1974, he was at the heart of the West German midfield when they reached the final in 1966 and achieved third place in 1970. Overath scored the only goal in the latter match, with many foreign journalists voting him Germany's best player in Mexico.

Overath is one of only seven players (alongside his teammates Franz Beckenbauer, Jürgen Grabowski, Horst-Dieter Höttges, Sepp Maier, later compatriot Miroslav Klose, and Italian Franco Baresi) with World Cup medals for first, second and third place. A main rival in the national team for leading the midfield was the flamboyant Günter Netzer from Borussia Mönchengladbach, German Player of the year in 1972 and 73. However, German coach Helmut Schön preferred the more staid Overath. An injury forced Overath out of the side before the quarterfinals of the European Championships 1972 where Netzer became alongside Franz Beckenbauer and Gerd Müller one of the outstanding protagonists leading the side, considered still Germany's best of all time, to victory in the final over the USSR. Overath soon regained his place ahead of Netzer, due to the latter's now being injured. Netzer himself said that Overath "was born to play for Germany".

In 2004, he was elected President of 1. FC Köln. He resigned on 13 November 2011.

== Style of play ==
A left-footed playmaker, Overath's style of play was frequently compared to his contemporary and rival, Günter Netzer. He is regarded as one of the prominent German midfielders of his era. Known primarily as an attacking midfielder with passing accuracy, ball control, and shooting ability, he also contributed defensively.

== Personal life ==
Overath has been married to his wife Karin for 57 years. They have three children: two sons and one adopted daughter. Also, he was named an honorary citizen of Siegburg in 2003. Overath was awarded the Egidius-Braun-Preis for his charity work. Overath is a devout Roman Catholic who prays daily.

== Career statistics ==
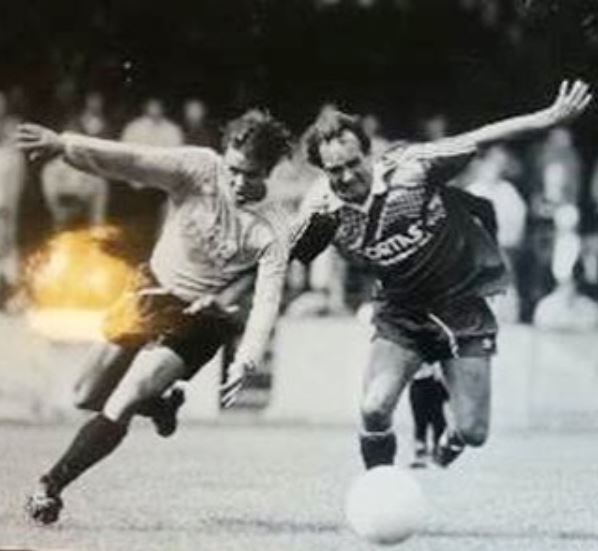
Overath (right) in 1992

=== Club ===
Appearances and goals by club, season and competition
Club	Season	League		
Club	Season	Division	Apps	Goals
1. FC Köln	1963–64	Bundesliga	30	8
1. FC Köln	1964–65	Bundesliga	27	9
1. FC Köln	1965–66	Bundesliga	30	3
1. FC Köln	1966–67	Bundesliga	33	6
1. FC Köln	1967–68	Bundesliga	29	9
1. FC Köln	1968–69	Bundesliga	34	6
1. FC Köln	1969–70	Bundesliga	29	12
1. FC Köln	1970–71	Bundesliga	26	4
1. FC Köln	1971–72	Bundesliga	25	6
1. FC Köln	1972–73	Bundesliga	30	3
1. FC Köln	1973–74	Bundesliga	31	5
1. FC Köln	1974–75	Bundesliga	34	4
1. FC Köln	1975–76	Bundesliga	27	2
1. FC Köln	1976–77	Bundesliga	24	6
Total			409	83

=== International ===
Appearances and goals by national team and year
National team	Year	Apps	Goals
Germany	1963	3	0
Germany	1964	4	1
Germany	1965	4	2
Germany	1966	13	3
Germany	1967	8	1
Germany	1968	8	2
Germany	1969	6	3
Germany	1970	12	2
Germany	1971	6	1
Germany	1972	0	0
Germany	1973	8	0
Germany	1974	9	2
Total		81	17

Scores and results list Germany's goal tally first, score column indicates score after each Overath goal.

List of international goals scored by Wolfgang Overath
No.	Date	Venue	Opponent	Score	Result	Competition	Ref.
1	7 June 1964	Helsinki Olympic Stadium, Helsinki, Finland	Finland	–	4–1	Friendly	
2	24 April 1965	Wildparkstadion, Karlsruhe, Germany	Cyprus	2–0	5–0	1966 FIFA World Cup qualification	
3	24 April 1965	Wildparkstadion, Karlsruhe, Germany	Cyprus	5–0	5–0	1966 FIFA World Cup qualification	
4	4 May 1966	Dalymount Park, Dublin, Republic of Ireland	Republic of Ireland	3–0	4–0	Friendly	
5	4 May 1966	Dalymount Park, Dublin, Republic of Ireland	Republic of Ireland	4–0	4–0	Friendly	
6	23 June 1966	Niedersachsenstadion, Hanover, Germany	Yugoslavia	1–0	2–0	Friendly	
7	27 September 1967	Olympiastadion, Berlin, Germany	France	5–0	5–1	Friendly	
8	8 May 1968	Ninian Park, Cardiff, Wales	Wales	–	1–1	Friendly	
9	25 September 1968	Stade Vélodrome, Marseille, France	France	1–1	1–1	Friendly	
10	21 April 1969	Georg-Melches-Stadion, Essen, Germany	Cyprus	2–0	12–0	1970 FIFA World Cup qualification	
11	21 April 1969	Georg-Melches-Stadion, Essen, Germany	Cyprus	3–0	12–0	1970 FIFA World Cup qualification	
12	21 April 1969	Georg-Melches-Stadion, Essen, Germany	Cyprus	11–0	12–0	1970 FIFA World Cup qualification	
13	8 April 1970	Neckarstadion, Stuttgart, Germany	Romania	1–1	1–1	Friendly	
14	20 June 1970	Estadio Azteca, Mexico City, Mexico	Uruguay	1–0	1–0	1970 FIFA World Cup	
15	22 June 1971	Ullevaal Stadion, Oslo, Norway	Norway	1–0	7–1	Friendly	
16	18 June 1974	Volksparkstadion, Hamburg, Germany	Australia	1–0	3–0	1974 FIFA World Cup	
17	30 June 1974	Merkur Spiel-Arena, Düsseldorf, Germany	Sweden	1–1	4–2	1974 FIFA World Cup	

== Honours ==
Köln

- Bundesliga: 1963–64
- DFB-Pokal: 1968, 1977

Germany

- FIFA World Cup: 1974; second place: 1966; third place: 1970

Individual

- kicker Bundesliga Team of the Season: 1965–66, 1967–68, 1969–70, 1973–74
- World XI: 1968
- FUWO European Team of the Season: 1970
- DFB-Pokal top scorer: 1971–72
- FIFA World Cup All-Star Team: 1974

Sporting positions
Preceded by Uwe Seeler	West Germany captain 1970–1972	Succeeded by Franz Beckenbauer
