= Govindasamy Suppiah =

Singaporean football referee

- Born: 17 June 1929
- Died: 6 December 2012 (aged 83)

Govindasamy Suppiah (17 June 1929 – 6 December 2012) was an Indian-born Singaporean football referee.

Suppiah officiated at the 1974 FIFA World Cup in West Germany, where he took charge of one match, Poland's 7–0 win against Haiti and went on to officiate as a linesman for two further matches.

He was also the first Asian born Official to referee a match at the FIFA World Cup.

== Personal life ==
Suppiah was born in India, and died at the age of 83, in Singapore. He had two grandchildren, daughter named Shamini Suppiah, son named Subra Suppiah and wife called Vallambal. Suppiah was a diabetic and had two toes removed from his foot after infection.

== Awards ==
He was awarded by FIFA for being a referee instructor for 25 years. In 2009, he was presented with Distinguished Service Award and a Gold Service Award and in September 2012, he was awarded the Lifetime Achievement Award.
