= Konrad Weise =

German footballer (born 1951)

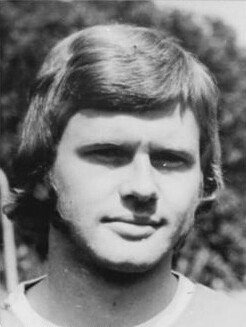
- Weise in 1974

Personal information
- Full name: Konrad Weise
- Date of birth: 17 August 1951 (age 75)
- Place of birth: Gera, East Germany
- Height: 1.74 m (5 ft 9 in)
- Position: Defender

Youth career
- 1961–1966: Fortschritt Greiz (de)
- 1966–1970: Carl Zeiss Jena

Senior career*
Years	Team	Apps	(Gls)
1969–1985	Carl Zeiss Jena II	22	(3)
1970–1986	Carl Zeiss Jena	310	(17)
Total		332	(20)

International career
1968–1970	East Germany U18 (de)	27	(1)
1970–1972	East Germany U23	8	(2)
1971–1976	East Germany Olympic	22	(1)
1970–1981	East Germany	86	(2)

Managerial career
- 1986–1998: Carl Zeiss Jena (youth)
- 1991: → Carl Zeiss Jena (interim)
- 1993: → Carl Zeiss Jena (interim)
- 1998–2000: FSV Zwickau (assistant)
- 2000–2002: FSV Zwickau
- 2003–2005: 1. FC Gera 03
Medal record
Representing East Germany
Men's Football
Bronze medal – third place	1972 Munich	Team competition
Gold medal – first place	1976 Montreal	Team competition
- * Club domestic league appearances and goals

Konrad Weise (born 17 August 1951 in Greiz) is a German former footballer who played as a defender. He played his career at senior level for Carl Zeiss Jena (1970–1986). At international level he played between 1970 and 1981 for the East Germany national team (86 matches, two goals), and was a participant at the 1974 FIFA World Cup.

== Career statistics ==
=== International ===
Appearances and goals by national team and year
National team	Year	Apps	Goals
East Germany	1970	1	1
East Germany	1971	7	0
East Germany	1972	7	0
East Germany	1973	6	0
East Germany	1974	19	0
East Germany	1975	8	1
East Germany	1976	6	0
East Germany	1977	10	0
East Germany	1978	5	0
East Germany	1979	11	0
East Germany	1980	5	0
East Germany	1981	1	0
Total		86	2

Scores and results list East Germany's goal tally first, score column indicates score after each Weise goal.

List of international goals scored by Konrad Weise
No.	Date	Venue	Opponent	Score	Result	Competition
1	26 July 1970	Ernst-Abbe-Sportfeld, Jena, East Germany	Iraq	5–0	5–0	Friendly
2	19 November 1975	Za Lužánkami Stadium, Brno, Czechoslovakia	Czechoslovakia	1–0	1–1	1976 Summer Olympics qualification
