= Harald Irmscher =

German footballer

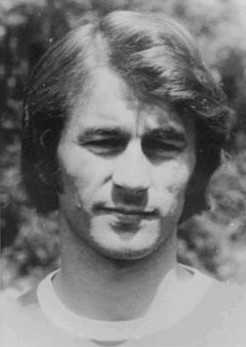

Personal information
- Date of birth: 12 February 1946 (age 80)
- Place of birth: Oelsnitz, Soviet-occupied Germany
- Position: Midfielder

International career
Years	Team	Apps	(Gls)
1966–1974	East Germany	41	(4)
Medal record
Representing East Germany
Men's Football
Bronze medal – third place	1972 Munich	Team competition

Harald Irmscher (born 12 February 1946 in Oelsnitz) is a former German football player.

Irmscher played for BSG Motor Zwickau (1964–1968), FC Carl Zeiss Jena (1968–1976) and BSG Wismut Gera (1976–1978).

On the national level he played between 1966 and 1974 for East Germany national team and was a participant at the 1974 FIFA World Cup.

In 2007–2011 he worked as a coach for Belarus assisting to head coach Bernd Stange. Later he worked as an assistant coach for Singapore, also with Bernd Stange.
