= Sergio Ahumada =

Chilean footballer (born 1948)

Personal information
- Full name: Sergio Alberto Ahumada Bacho
- Date of birth: October 2, 1948 (age 78)
- Place of birth: Coquimbo, Chile
- Height: 1.76 m (5 ft 9 in)
- Position: Forward

Youth career
- Cantera Alta
- Deportes La Serena

Senior career*
| Years | Team | Apps | (Gls) |
| 1966–1969 | Deportes La Serena | 67 | (14) |
| 1967 | → San Antonio Unido (loan) | | |
| 1970–1974 | Colo-Colo | 107 | (39) |
| 1974–1975 | Unión Española | 36 | (19) |
| 1975 | Tecos | 13 | (0) |
| 1976–1978 | Everton | 76 | (31) |
| 1979–1980 | O'Higgins | 26 | (4) |
| 1980–1981 | Deportes La Serena | | |
| 1981 | Coquimbo Unido | | |

International career
| 1973–1977 | Chile | 29 | (6) |

Managerial career
- 1991–2020: Coquimbo Unido (assistant)
- * Club domestic league appearances and goals

Sergio Alberto Ahumada Bacho (born 2 October 1948) is a retired Chilean footballer, who played for Deportes La Serena, Colo-Colo, Tecos, Unión Española, among others clubs.

== Club career ==
Born in La Cantera town, Coquimbo, Chile, Ahumada was trained at local team Club Deportivo Cantera Alta and Deportes La Serena. He made his professional debut with Deportes La Serena in 1966 and was loaned out to San Antonio Unido in the Chilean second level the next year.

Following Deportes La Serena, Ahumada continued his career with Colo-Colo, Unión Española, Everton de Viña del Mar and O'Higgins in the Chilean Primera División.

Abroad, Ahumada played for Mexican club Tecos in the second half of 1975.

Ahumada ended his career with Deportes La Serena and Coquimbo Unido in the Chilean second level in 1980 and 1981, respectively.

== International career ==
He earned 29 caps and scored 6 goals for the Chile national football team, and scored the only Chilean goal in the 1974 FIFA World Cup in a 1–1 draw against East Germany.

== Coaching career ==
In 1991, Ahumada joined the technical staff of José Sulantay in Coquimbo Unido as an assistant coach. He continued serving the club for almost twenty years.

== Personal life ==
Ahumada is better known by his nickname Negro (Black).

== Honours ==
Colo-Colo

- Primera División (2): 1970, 1972

Unión Española

- Primera División (1): 1975

Everton

- Primera División (1): 1976
