= Joachim Streich =

German footballer (1951–2022)

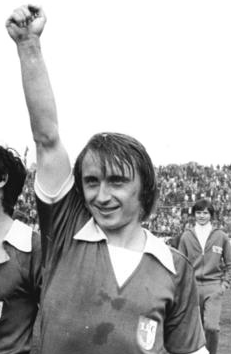
- Streich with 1. FC Magdeburg in 1978

Personal information
- Date of birth: 13 April 1951
- Place of birth: Wismar, East Germany
- Date of death: 16 April 2022 (aged 71)
- Place of death: Leipzig, Germany
- Height: 1.73 m (5 ft 8 in)
- Position: Striker

Youth career
- 1957–1963: Aufbau Wismar
- 1963–1967: TSG Wismar
- 1967–1969: Hansa Rostock

Senior career*
Years	Team	Apps	(Gls)
1969–1975	Hansa Rostock	141	(58)
1975–1985	1. FC Magdeburg	237	(171)
Total		378	(229)

International career
1969–1984	East Germany	98	(53)
1972	East Germany Olympic	4	(2)

Managerial career
- 1985–1990: 1. FC Magdeburg
- 1990–1991: Eintracht Braunschweig
- 1991–1992: 1. FC Magdeburg
- 1996–1997: FSV Zwickau
Medal record
Representing East Germany
Men's Football
Bronze medal – third place	1972 Munich	Team competition
- * Club domestic league appearances and goals

Joachim Streich (13 April 1951 – 16 April 2022) was a German professional footballer who won the bronze medal with East Germany at the 1972 Summer Olympics in Munich.

== Playing career ==
Between 1969 and 1984, Streich earned 102 appearances for East Germany, scoring 55 goals. He was considered a member of the FIFA Century Club, but when FIFA changed regulations to no longer include games at the Olympic Games, four of his matches were removed from his official FIFA record and Streich dropped out. The German Football Association (DFB) still lists him with 102 appearances on its website.

Streich was regarded as one of the best footballers from East Germany and held both the records for most appearances alongside goals scored for the national team. He took part in the 1974 FIFA World Cup, scoring two goals in four matches.

During his career, Streich played 378 games in the DDR-Oberliga for F.C. Hansa Rostock and 1. FC Magdeburg, scoring a record 229 goals. This tally earned him the top scorer award four times. He also scored 17 goals in 42 European matches for Rostock (4–0) and Magdeburg (38–17). Between 1979 and 1983, he won the East German Footballer of the Year award. Streich set the all-time DDR-Oberliga record for most goals scored in a game when he netted six in 1. FC Magdeburg's 10–2 defeat of BSG Chemie Böhlen in August 1977.

== Death ==
Streich died of myelodysplastic syndrome on 16 April 2022.

== Statistics ==
=== International goals ===
Scores and results list East Germany's goal tally first, score column indicates score after each Streich goal.

List of international goals scored by Joachim Streich
No.	Date	Venue	Opponent	Score	Result	Competition
1	25 September 1971	East Berlin, East Germany	Czechoslovakia	1–1	Draw	Friendly
2	10 July 1972	Dresden, East Germany	Finland	5–0	Won	1974 FIFA World Cup qualification
3	10 July 1972	Dresden, East Germany	Finland	5–0	Won	1974 FIFA World Cup qualification
4	15 February 1973	Bogotá, Colombia	Colombia	2–0	Won	Friendly
5	7 April 1973	Magdeburg, East Germany	Albania	2–0	Won	1974 FIFA World Cup qualification
6	16 May 1973	Karl-Marx-Stadt, East Germany	Hungary	2–1	Won	Friendly
7	16 May 1973	Karl-Marx-Stadt, East Germany	Hungary	2–1	Won	Friendly
8	6 June 1973	Tampere, Finland	Finland	5–1	Won	1974 FIFA World Cup qualification
9	6 June 1973	Tampere, Finland	Finland	5–1	Won	1974 FIFA World Cup qualification
10	17 October 1973	Leipzig, East Germany	Soviet Union	1–0	Won	Friendly
11	3 November 1973	Tirana, Albania	Albania	4–1	Won	1974 FIFA World Cup qualification
12	3 November 1973	Tirana, Albania	Albania	4–1	Won	1974 FIFA World Cup qualification
13	28 February 1974	Algiers, Algeria	Algeria	3–1	Won	Friendly
14	13 March 1974	East Berlin, East Germany	Belgium	1–0	Won	Friendly
15	27 March 1974	Dresden, East Germany	Czechoslovakia	1–0	Win	Friendly
16	29 May 1974	Leipzig, East Germany	England	1–1	Draw	Friendly
17	14 June 1974	Hamburg, West Germany	Australia	2–0	Won	1974 FIFA World Cup
18	3 July 1974	Gelsenkirchen, West Germany	Argentina	1–1	Draw	1974 FIFA World Cup
19	25 July 1975	Ottawa, Canada	Canada	7–1	Won	Friendly
20	25 July 1975	Ottawa, Canada	Canada	7–1	Won	Friendly
21	10 December 1975	Leipzig, East Germany	France	2–1	Won	UEFA Euro 1976 qualifying
22	27 October 1976	Sliven, Bulgaria	Bulgaria	4–0	Won	Friendly
23	27 October 1976	Sliven, Bulgaria	Bulgaria	4–0	Won	Friendly
24	2 April 1977	Gżira, Malta	Malta	1–0	Won	1978 FIFA World Cup qualification
25	19 October 1977	Potsdam, East Germany	Malta	9–0	Won	1978 FIFA World Cup qualification
26	19 October 1977	Potsdam, East Germany	Malta	9–0	Won	1978 FIFA World Cup qualification
27	19 October 1977	Potsdam, East Germany	Malta	9–0	Won	1978 FIFA World Cup qualification
28	9 February 1979	Baghdad, Iraq	Iraq	1–1	Draw	Friendly
29	18 April 1979	Leipzig, East Germany	Poland	2–1	Won	UEFA Euro 1980 qualifying
30	5 May 1979	Saint Gallen, Switzerland	Switzerland	2–0	Won	UEFA Euro 1980 qualifying
31	6 June 1979	East Berlin, East Germany	Romania	1–0	Won	Friendly
32	12 September 1979	Reykjavík, Iceland	Iceland	3–0	Won	UEFA Euro 1980 qualifying
33	21 November 1979	Leipzig, East Germany	Netherlands	2–3	Lost	UEFA Euro 1980 qualifying
34	13 February 1980	Málaga, Spain	Spain	1–0	Won	Friendly
35	2 April 1980	Bucharest, Romania	Romania	2–2	Draw	Friendly
36	16 April 1980	Leipzig, East Germany	Greece	2–0	Won	Friendly
37	8 October 1980	Prague, Czechoslovakia	Czechoslovakia	1–0	Won	Friendly
38	19 November 1980	Halle, East Germany	Hungary	2–0	Won	Friendly
39	19 May 1981	Senftenberg, East Germany	Cuba	5–0	Won	Friendly
40	10 October 1981	Leipzig, East Germany	Poland	2–3	Lost	1982 FIFA World Cup qualification
41	11 November 1981	Jena, East Germany	Malta	5–1	Won	1982 FIFA World Cup qualification
42	11 November 1981	Jena, East Germany	Malta	5–1	Won	1982 FIFA World Cup qualification
43	8 September 1982	Reykjavík, Iceland	Iceland	1–0	Won	Friendly
44	10 February 1983	Tunis, Tunisia	Tunisia	2–0	Won	Friendly
45	23 February 1983	Dresden, East Germany	Greece	2–1	Won	Friendly
46	16 March 1983	Magdeburg, East Germany	Finland	3–1	Won	Friendly
47	30 March 1983	Leipzig, East Germany	Belgium	1–2	Lost	UEFA Euro 1984 qualifying
48	13 April 1983	Gera, East Germany	Bulgaria	3–0	Won	Friendly
49	27 April 1983	Brussels, Belgium	Belgium	1–2	Lost	UEFA Euro 1984 qualifying
50	26 July 1983	Leipzig, East Germany	Soviet Union	1–3	Lost	Friendly
51	12 October 1983	East Berlin, East Germany	Switzerland	3–0	Won	UEFA Euro 1984 qualifying
52	16 November 1983	Halle, East Germany	Scotland	2–1	Won	UEFA Euro 1984 qualifying
53	10 October 1984	Aue, East Germany	Algeria	5–2	Won	Friendly

== See also ==
- List of men's footballers with 50 or more international goals
