= Gerd Kische =

East German footballer

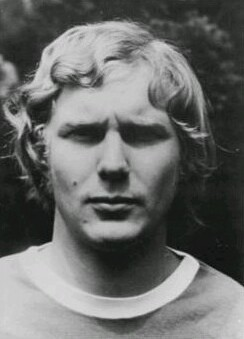
- Kische in 1974

Personal information
- Full name: Gerhard Kische
- Date of birth: 23 October 1951 (age 75)
- Place of birth: Teterow, East Germany
- Height: 1.77 m (5 ft 10 in)
- Position: Defender

Youth career
- –1960: BSG Einheit Teterow (de)
- 1960–1970: Post Neubrandenburg

Senior career*
Years	Team	Apps	(Gls)
1969–1970	Post Neubrandenburg		
1970–1981	Hansa Rostock	182	(11)
1970–1971	Hansa Rostock II		
1981–1983	TSG Bau Rostock	36	(7)
1963–1984	Post Neubrandenburg	3	(0)
Total		221	(18)

International career
1970	East Germany U21	1	(0)
1971–1982	East Germany	63	(0)
- * Club domestic league appearances and goals

Olympic medal record

Representing East Germany

Men's football
Gold medal – first place	1976 Montreal	Team competition

Gerhard "Gerd" Kische (born 23 October 1951 in Teterow) is a former German football player.

Kische played for FC Hansa Rostock from 1970 to 1981.

On the national level, he played for the East Germany national team (63 matches without scoring), and was a participant at the 1974 FIFA World Cup. He won gold at the 1976 Olympic football competition. He won his first cap in 1971 against Mexico.

== Honours ==
=== Club ===
Hansa Rostock

- DDR-Liga: 1975–76, 1977–78, 1979–80

=== National team ===
East Germany

- Summer Olympics gold medalist: 1976
