= Bernd Bransch =

East German footballer (1944–2022)

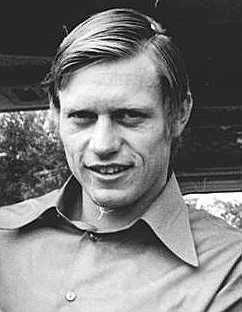
- Bransch at the 1974 World Cup

Personal information
- Date of birth: 24 September 1944
- Place of birth: Halle, Halle-Merseburg, Prussia, Germany
- Date of death: 11 June 2022 (aged 77)
- Position: Sweeper

Youth career
- 1954–1962: Chemie Halle

Senior career*
Years	Team	Apps	(Gls)
1962–1973	Chemie Halle		
1973–1974	Carl Zeiss Jena		
1974–1977	Chemie Halle		

International career
1967–1976	East Germany	64	(3)
Medal record
Men's football
Gold medal – first place	1976 Montreal	Team
Bronze medal – third place	1972 Munich	Team
- * Club domestic league appearances and goals

Bernd Bransch (24 September 1944 – 11 June 2022) was a footballer from East Germany who played as a sweeper.

== Career ==
Bransch began his sporting career as a youngster at BSG Motor Halle-Süd. The son of a locksmith was then allowed to join sports club SC Chemie Halle in 1954. Bransch played throughout his career for SC Chemie Halle and its successor, Hallescher FC Chemie – except for the 1973/74 season, in which he played for FC Carl Zeiss Jena.

In 1968 and 1974 he was honoured as East German Footballer of the Year.

Bransch participated in the Munich Olympics 1972, in which his East German team secured a bronze medal, and in the gold medal-winning Montreal Olympics 1976 side. He also played in the 1974 FIFA World Cup.

In total Bransch played 317 league games, scoring 43 goals.

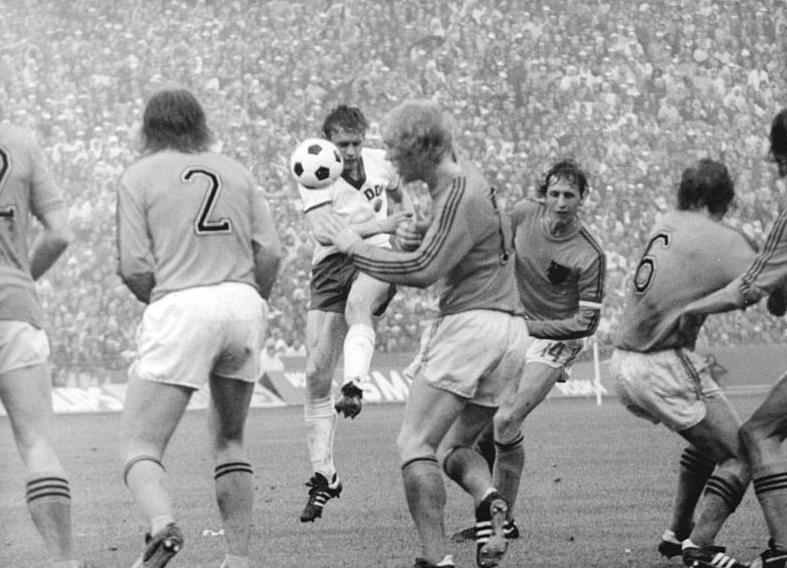
Bransch (in white) takes a free-kick against the Netherlands at the 1974 World Cup.
