= Ramón Barreto =

Uruguayan football referee

Ramón Ivanoes Barreto Ruiz (14 September 1939 – 4 April 2015) was a Uruguayan professional association football referee. He is the only referee in the history of the FIFA World Cup to have been appointed to two consecutive Final matches: in 1974 in Munich, and in 1978 in Buenos Aires.

Barreto was first selected as a FIFA World Cup referee in Germany. There he was assigned to referee the highly publicised fixture between East Germany and West Germany in Hamburg. Besides the two World Cups, Barreto is notable in England as the man who sent off Trevor Cherry in the game between England and Argentina at the Bombonera during England's tour of South America in 1977. He was also an official at the 1975 Copa América and at the 1976 Olympics.

Barreto was selected for his second World Cup in 1978 in Argentina. It was there that he was appointed match referee for the repeat of the 1974 Final between West Germany and the Netherlands. Thereafter he was selected to represent his country in the final game between Argentina and the Netherlands, in which served as an assistant referee to Sergio Gonella, the first Italian ever to referee the final.
