= 1974 FIFA World Cup =

Association football tournament in West Germany

Fußball-Weltmeisterschaft 1974 (German)

Tournament details
- Host country: West Germany
- Dates: 13 June – 7 July
- Teams: 16 (from 5 confederations)
- Venues: 9 (in 9 host cities)

Final positions
- Champions: West Germany (2nd title)
- Runners-up: Netherlands
- Third place: Poland
- Fourth place: Brazil

Tournament statistics
- Matches played: 38
- Goals scored: 97 (2.55 per match)
- Attendance: 1,865,753 (49,099 per match)
- Top scorer: (Poland) Grzegorz Lato (7 goals)
- Best young player: (Poland) Władysław Żmuda
- Fair play award: West Germany

The 1974 FIFA World Cup was the tenth edition of the FIFA World Cup, the quadrennial football tournament for men's senior national teams, and was played in West Germany (and West Berlin) between 13 June and 7 July. The tournament marked the first time that the current trophy, the FIFA World Cup Trophy, created by the Italian sculptor Silvio Gazzaniga, was awarded. The previous trophy, the Jules Rimet Trophy, had been won for the third time by Brazil in 1970 and awarded permanently to the Brazilians.

West Germany won the title, beating the Netherlands 2–1 in the final at the Olympiastadion in Munich. This was the second title for West Germany, who had also won in 1954. The teams of Australia, East Germany, Haiti and Zaire made their first appearances at the final stage, and East Germany making their only appearance before Germany was reunified in 1990. Brazil, the defending champions, were eliminated in the second round by the Netherlands, and lost the match for third place to Poland.

Poland's Grzegorz Lato led the tournament in scoring seven goals. Gerd Müller's goal in the final was the 14th in his career of two World Cups, beating Just Fontaine's record of 13, in his single World Cup in 1958. Müller's record was surpassed in 2006 by Ronaldo's 15 from three World Cups.

Günter Netzer, who came on as a substitute for West Germany during the defeat by the East Germans, was playing for Real Madrid at the time; this was the first time that a World Cup winner had played for a club outside his home country. This is the most recent of four World Cup tournaments to date with no matches needing extra time. The others are the 1930, 1950, and 1962 tournaments.

== Host selection ==
West Germany was chosen as the host nation by FIFA in London, England on 6 July 1966. Hosting rights for the 1978 and 1982 tournaments were awarded at the same time. West Germany agreed to a deal with Spain by which Spain would support West Germany for the 1974 tournament, and in return West Germany would allow Spain to bid for the 1982 World Cup unopposed.

=== Havelange on "planned" host winner ===
Speaking in 2008, Brazilian former FIFA president João Havelange said to Folha de Sao Paulo that this competition, along with the 1966 FIFA World Cup in England, was fixed so that the host country would win; "In the three matches that the Brazilian national team played in 1966, of the three referees and six linesmen, seven were British and two were Germans. Brazil went out, Pelé 'exited' through injury [following some rough defensive play], and England and Germany entered into the final, just as the Englishman Sir Stanley Rous, who was the President of FIFA at the time, had wanted. In Germany in 1974 the same thing happened. During the Brazil-Netherlands match, the referee was German, we lost 2–0 and Germany won the title. We were the best in the world, and had the same team that had won the World Cup in 1962 in Chile and 1970 in Mexico, but it was planned for the host countries to win".

== Qualification ==
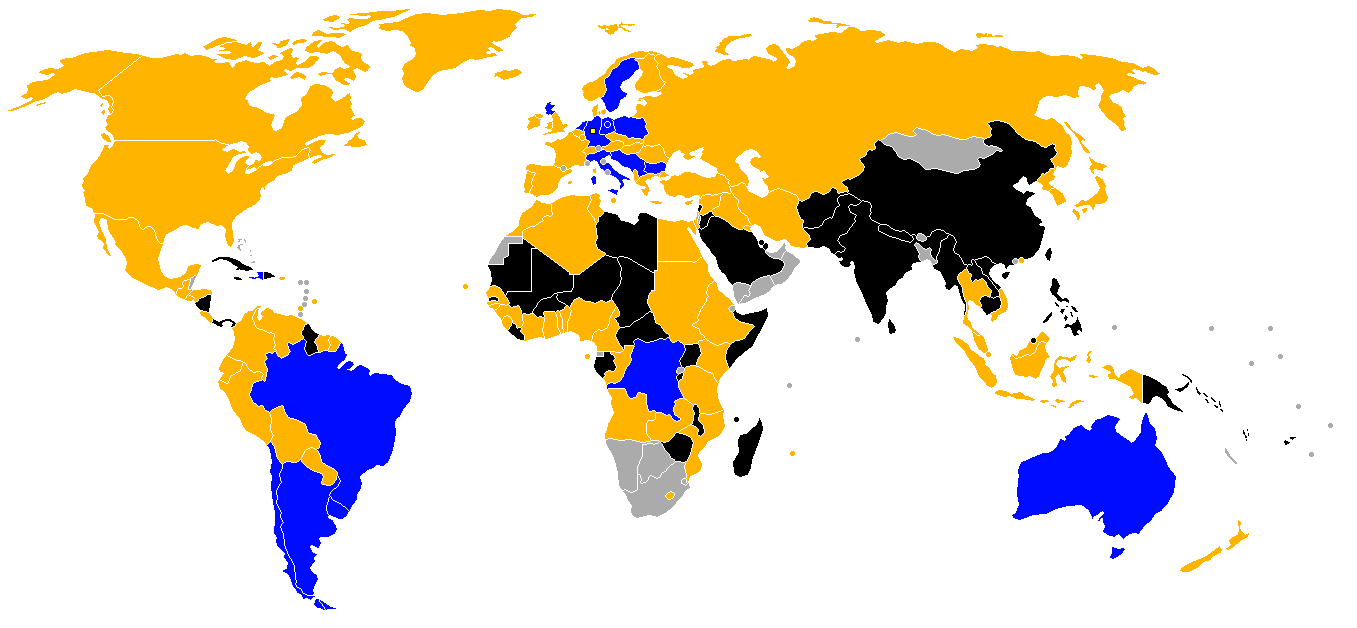
Countries that qualified for the World Cup Countries that failed to qualify Countries that did not enter the World Cup Country not a FIFA member in 1974

Ninety-eight countries took part in the qualifying tournament.

The USSR was controversially disqualified after refusing to travel for the second leg of their playoff against Chile as a result of the 1973 Chilean coup d'état. The Netherlands and Poland qualified for the first time since 1938. Scotland were back in the finals after a 16-year absence. Argentina and Chile were also back after having missed the 1970 tournament and Yugoslavia returned after missing both the 1966 and 1970 tournaments.

First-time qualifiers were:

- East Germany (who made their sole appearance in a FIFA senior tournament as a separate team)
- Australia, which were the first team from Oceania to qualify
- Haiti, the first team from the Caribbean to qualify since Cuba in 1938
- Zaire, the first team from sub-Saharan Africa to reach the finals, and the third African team overall.

This was the first of eight tournaments in which the defending champions (in this case Brazil) played in the opening game rather than the hosts. This change was reverted for the 2006 tournament, as the defending champions no longer had a secured spot in the tournament.

=== List of qualified teams ===
The following 16 teams qualified for the final tournament.

AFC/OFC (1)

- Australia (debut)

CAF (1)

- Zaire (debut)

CONCACAF (1)

- Haiti (debut)

CONMEBOL (4)

- Argentina
- Brazil (reigning champions)
- Chile
- Uruguay

UEFA (9)

- Bulgaria
- East Germany (debut)
- Italy
- Netherlands
- Poland
- Scotland
- Sweden
- West Germany (hosts)
- Yugoslavia

== Format ==
The tournament featured a new format; the sixteen (16) teams were divided into four groups of four teams, but the eight teams which advanced did not enter a knockout stage as in the previous five World Cups, but played in a second group stage, in two groups of four. In the second stage, the two group winners advanced to the final, with the respective runners-up meeting for third place. This was the first of two times for this format (also 1978). For 1974, FIFA introduced the penalty shoot-out as a means of determining the winner in knockout stages should the match end on a draw after 120 minutes. The method was not needed until 1982, and was first employed in the semi-final match between France and West Germany.

It was decided in advance that if the host nation (West Germany) progressed to the second round, their matches would not start simultaneous to the others, but in an alternate timeslot (either 16:00 or 19:30 local time).

== Summary ==
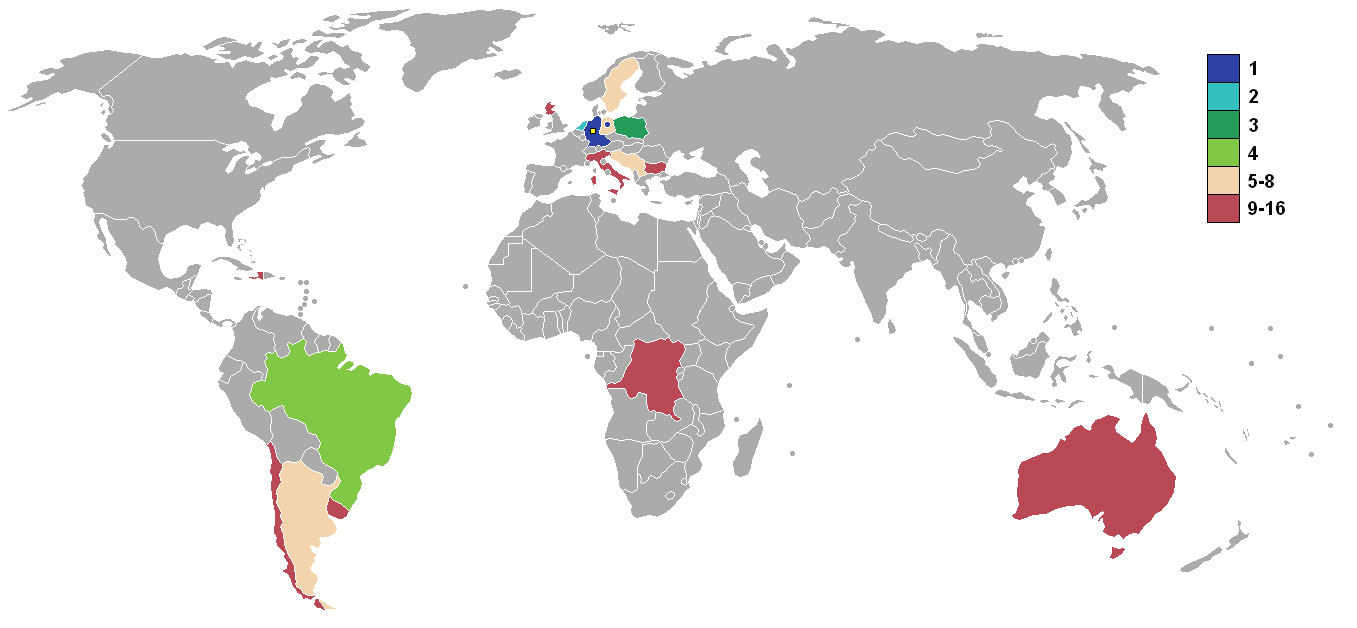
Results of finalists

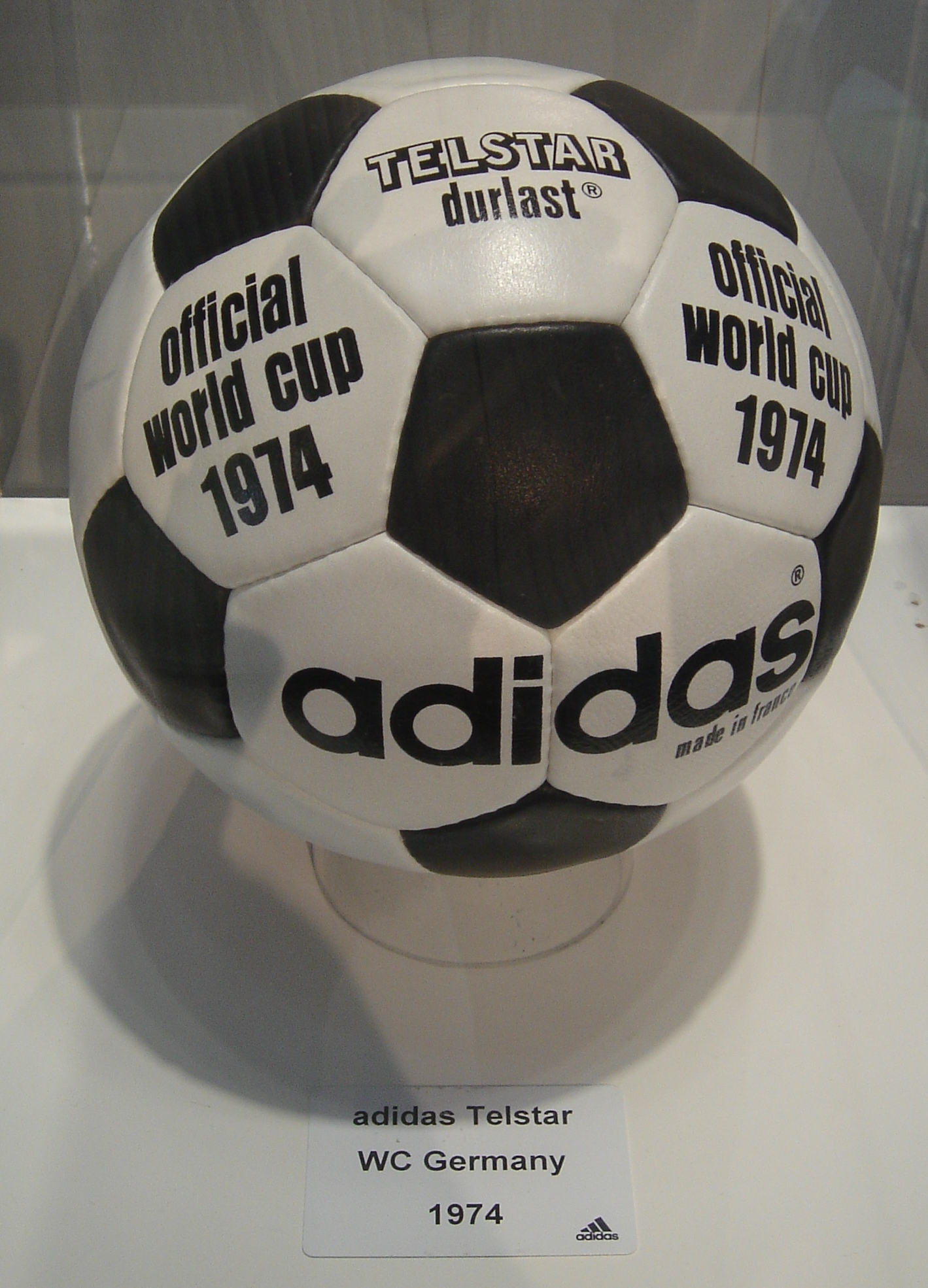
One of two official match footballs of the FIFA World Cup 1974 – the Adidas Telstar durlast. The other, was the all-white Adidas Chile durlast

=== First round ===
The tournament was held mostly in bad weather, and the stadia had few protected places. Only five western European nations had qualified, of which only the Netherlands, West Germany and Sweden made it past the group stage. Fans from the Eastern Communist neighbour states East Germany, Bulgaria and Poland were hindered by political circumstances.

Carlos Caszely of Chile became the first player to be sent off with a red card in a World Cup match, during their match against West Germany. Red cards were formally introduced in World Cup play in 1970, but no players were sent off in that tournament.

Two teams made a particularly powerful impact on the first round. The Netherlands demonstrated the "Total Football" techniques pioneered by the top Dutch club Ajax, in which specialised positions were virtually abolished for the outfield players, and individual players became defenders, midfielders or strikers as the situation required. The Dutch marked their first World Cup finals since 1938 by topping their first-round group, with wins over Uruguay and Bulgaria and a draw with Sweden. Sweden joined the Dutch in the second group round after beating Uruguay 3–0.

Poland, meanwhile, appearing for the first time since 1938, took maximum points from a group containing two of the favourites for the tournament. They beat Argentina 3–2, trounced Haiti 7–0, then beat Italy 2–1 – a result that allowed Argentina to qualify for the second group round ahead of Italy on goal difference. Argentina would not fail to win either of their opening two games of a World Cup again until 2018. While Haiti lost all three games and finished second-to-last in the tournament, they did have one moment of glory; in their opening game against Italy, they managed to take the lead with a goal from Emmanuel Sanon, before eventually losing 3–1. That goal proved to be significant as it ended Dino Zoff's run of 1,142 minutes without conceding a goal – Italy had not conceded in their last 12 international matches.

Group 2 was a particularly close group. With Brazil, Yugoslavia and Scotland drawing all their games against each other, it was decided by the number of goals these three teams scored when defeating Zaire. Yugoslavia hammered the African nation 9–0, equalling a finals record for the largest margin of victory, although the game was only played after tournament officials paid the Zaire players, after their own officials had stolen the teams wages and allowances. Brazil beat them 3–0, which Zaire played under the threat of exile if they lost by four or more goals. Scotland only managed a 2–0 margin, and so were edged out of the tournament on goal difference. They were the only team that did not lose a game in the tournament and the first ever country to be eliminated from a World Cup Finals without having lost a match.

Group 1 contained both East Germany and the host West Germany, and they both progressed at the expense of Chile and newcomers Australia. The last game played in Group 1 was much anticipated, a first ever clash between the two German teams. West Germany was already assured of progression to the second round whatever the result. In one of the most politically charged matches of all time, the East won, thanks to a late Jürgen Sparwasser goal. This result forced a realignment of the West German team that would later help them win the tournament.

=== Second round ===
Coincidentally, the two second-round groups both produced matches that were, in effect, semi-finals. In Group A, the Netherlands and Brazil met after each had taken maximum points from their previous two matches. In Group B, the same happened with West Germany and Poland – so the winners of these two games would contest the final.

In Group A, two goals from the inspirational Johan Cruyff helped the Dutch side thrash Argentina 4–0. At the same time, Brazil defeated East Germany 1–0. The Dutch triumphed over East Germany 2–0 while in the "Battle of the South Americans", Brazil managed to defeat Argentina 2–1 in a scrappy match. Argentina and East Germany drew 1–1 and were on their way home while the crucial match between the Netherlands and Brazil turned into another triumph for Total Football, as second-half goals from Johan Neeskens and Cruyff put the Netherlands in the final. However the match would also be remembered for harsh defending on both sides.

Meanwhile, in Group B, West Germany and Poland both managed to beat Yugoslavia and Sweden. The crucial game between the Germans and the Poles was goalless until the 76th minute, when Gerd Muller scored to send the hosts through 1–0. The Poles took third place after defeating Brazil 1–0.

=== Final ===
The final was held on 7 July 1974 at Olympiastadion, Munich. West Germany was led by Franz Beckenbauer, while the Dutch had their star Johan Cruyff, and their Total Football system which had dazzled the competition. With just a minute gone on the clock, following a solo run, Cruyff was brought down by Uli Hoeneß inside the German penalty area, and the Dutch took the lead from the ensuing penalty by Johan Neeskens before any German player had even touched the ball. West Germany struggled to recover, and in the 26th minute were awarded a penalty, after Bernd Hölzenbein fell within the Dutch area, causing English referee Jack Taylor to award another controversial penalty. Paul Breitner spontaneously decided to kick, and scored. These two penalties were the first in a World Cup final. West Germany now pushed, and in the 43rd minute, in his typical style, Gerd Müller scored what turned out to be the winning goal, and the last of his international career as he retired from the national team. The second half saw chances for both sides, with Müller putting the ball in the net for a goal that was disallowed as offside. In the 85th minute, Hölzenbein was fouled again, but no penalty this time. Eventually, West Germany, the 1972 European champions, also won the 1974 World Cup.

This was the only case of the reigning European champions winning the World Cup, until Spain (winners of the UEFA Euro 2008) defeated the Netherlands in the 2010 FIFA World Cup final. Spain repeated the feat years later, winning the UEFA Euro 2024 and then the 2026 FIFA World Cup. France have also held both trophies at the same time, albeit in a different order, by winning the 1998 FIFA World Cup followed by the UEFA Euro 2000.

This was only the second time that a team had won the World Cup after losing a match in the finals (West Germany losing to East Germany during the group stage). The previous occasion was West Germany's earlier win in 1954.

== Mascots ==
The official mascots of this World Cup were Tip and Tap, two boys wearing an outfit similar to West Germany's, with the letters WM (Weltmeisterschaft, World Cup) and number 74.

== Venues ==
West Berlin	Munich	Stuttgart
Olympiastadion	Olympiastadion	Neckarstadion
Capacity: 86,000	Capacity: 77,573	Capacity: 72,200
Gelsenkirchen	1974 FIFA World Cup is located in FRG and West Berlin	
Parkstadion	1974 FIFA World Cup is located in FRG and West Berlin	
Capacity: 72,000	1974 FIFA World Cup is located in FRG and West Berlin	
Düsseldorf	1974 FIFA World Cup is located in FRG and West Berlin	
Rheinstadion	1974 FIFA World Cup is located in FRG and West Berlin	
Capacity: 70,100	1974 FIFA World Cup is located in FRG and West Berlin	
Frankfurt	1974 FIFA World Cup is located in FRG and West Berlin	
Waldstadion	1974 FIFA World Cup is located in FRG and West Berlin	
Capacity: 62,200	1974 FIFA World Cup is located in FRG and West Berlin	
Hamburg	Hanover	Dortmund
Volksparkstadion	Niedersachsenstadion	Westfalenstadion
Capacity: 61,300	Capacity: 60,400	Capacity: 53,600

== Match officials ==
AFC

- (Iran) Jafar Namdar
- (Singapore) Govindasamy Suppiah

CAF

- (Egypt) Mahmoud Mustafa Kamel
- (Senegal) Youssou N'Diaye

CONCACAF

- (Mexico) Alfonso González Archundía
- (Canada) Werner Winsemann

CONMEBOL

- (Uruguay) Ramón Barreto
- (Colombia) Omar Delgado Gómez
- (Venezuela) Vicente Llobregat
- (Brazil) Armando Marques
- (Argentina) Luis Pestarino
- (Peru) Edison Peréz Núñez

UEFA

- (West Germany) Heinz Aldinger
- (Italy) Aurelio Angonese
- (Turkey) Doğan Babacan
- (Scotland) Bob Davidson
- (East Germany) Rudi Glöckner
- (Soviet Union) Pavel Kasakov
- (Austria) Erich Linemayr
- (Belgium) Vital Loraux
- (Hungary) Károly Palotai
- (Romania) Nicolae Rainea
- (Spain) Pablo Sánchez Ibáñez
- (Switzerland) Rudolf Scheurer
- (West Germany) Gerhard Schulenburg
- (England) Jack Taylor
- (Wales) Clive Thomas
- (West Germany) Kurt Tschenscher
- (Netherlands) Arie van Gemert
- (West Germany) Hans-Joachim Weyland

OFC

- (Australia) Tony Boskovic

== Squads ==
For a list of all squads that appeared in the final tournament, see 1974 FIFA World Cup squads.

== Seeding ==
The FIFA Organising Committee agreed by vote to seed the hosts, holders and the other two 1970 semi-finalists into the first position of the four groups:

- Brazil (1970 semi-finalists and holders)
- Italy (1970 semi-finalists)
- Uruguay (1970 semi-finalists)
- West Germany (1970 semi-finalists and hosts)

Then the remaining spots in the groups were determined by dividing the participants into pots based on geographical sections. When the final draw was held, the 16th and final qualifier was not yet known; it would be either Yugoslavia or Spain subject to the result of a final playoff match in February 1974. The two teams had finished with an identical record in their qualification group, and following this situation the rules were changed, so that tied teams had to compete in a playoff match on neutral ground.

Seeded teams (hosts, holders and 1970 semi-finalists)	Pot 1: Western Europe (unseeded teams)	Pot 2: Eastern Europe (unseeded teams)	Pot 3: South America (unseeded teams)	Pot 4: Rest of the World (unseeded teams)
West Germany (hosts, Group 1); Brazil (holders, Group 2); Italy (Group 3 or 4, decided by draw); Uruguay (Group 3 or 4, decided by draw)	Netherlands; Scotland	Bulgaria; East Germany; Poland; Yugoslavia or Spain	Argentina; Chile	Australia; Haiti; Sweden; Zaire

=== Final draw ===
The final draw took place at 21:30 local time on 5 January 1974 in HR Sendesaal in Frankfurt, and was televised on Eurovision. 80 commentators were gathered at the Eurovision headquarters, and TV stations from 32 countries had requested pictures of the ceremony at the time. The TV broadcast of this show was followed by an estimated 800 million people.

Ahead of the draw, the FIFA Organising Committee decided that the host nation (West Germany) and trophy holder (Brazil) would be seeded, and placed respectively into the first position of Groups 1 and 2 prior to the draw. The remaining two top-seeded teams (Uruguay and Italy) would be drawn into the first position of Group 3 and Group 4. (Note: First position of the four groups were for unknown reasons, displayed at the televised draw as the second line of each drawn group. The top-seeded team at this "first position" in Group 1 had the benefit of playing the first opening match and closing match of their group, after knowing the results from competing matches. In groups 2–4, all matches were played at the exact same local time, meaning there was no benefit for the top-seeded team, other than having avoided to meet other top-seeded teams already in the first group stage.) It was also decided that South American nations could not play in the same group during the first group stage. In other words, Argentina and Chile drawn from pot 3, could not be drawn into the two groups seeded by Brazil and Uruguay.

Uruguay was drawn before Italy, taking the seeded first position of Group 3, and Italy were drawn into the seeded first position of Group 4. Next, the remaining two South American teams from pot 3 were drawn into the two top-seeded European groups (Group 1 and Group 4), as per the draw regulations. This was followed by a draw of the remaining two European teams from pot 1 into Groups 2 and 3. Finally other nations were drawn on an unseeded basis, one by one into Group 1–4 in numerical order, first from pot 2 and then from pot 4.

The "innocent hand" who made the draws was an 11-year-old boy, Detlef Lange, a member of the Schöneberger Sängerknaben, a children's choir.

The great sensation of the draw was the meeting of the two German teams in Group 1. When FIFA President Sir Stanley Rous had announced the lot, the room was quiet for a few moments, followed by long-lasting applause. In the days following the event, a rumour began circulating that East Germany would consider withdrawing from the World Cup following a meeting with the West Germany delegation; however, this was quickly and officially denied by the East German government.

== First group stage ==
The first round, or first group stage, saw the 16 teams divided evenly into four groups. Each group was a round-robin of six games, where each team played each of the other teams in the same group once. Teams were awarded two points for a win, one point for a draw and none for a defeat. The teams finishing first and second in each group qualified for the second round, while the bottom two teams in each group were eliminated from the tournament.

Tie-breaking criteria

Teams were ranked on the following criteria:

1. Greater number of points in all group matches
2. Goal difference in all group matches
3. Goals scored in all group matches
4. Drawing of lots by the FIFA Organising Committee

=== Group 1 ===
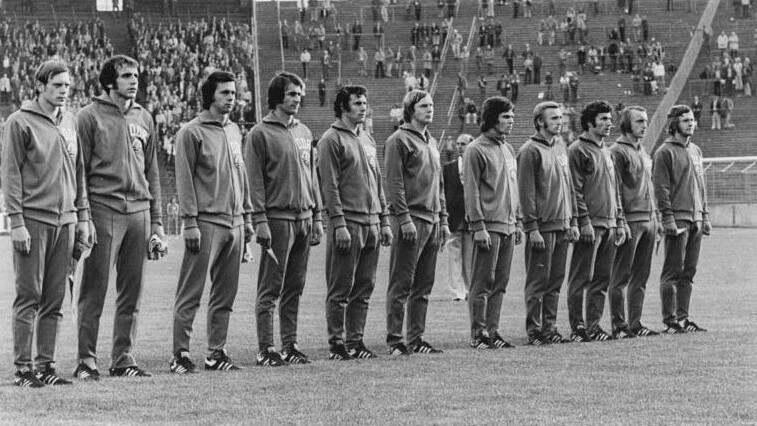
East German line-up v. Australia

Pos	Team	Pld	W	D	L	GF	GA	GD	Pts	Qualification
1	East Germany	3	2	1	0	4	1	+3	5	Advance to second round
2	West Germany	3	2	0	1	4	1	+3	4	Advance to second round
3	Chile	3	0	2	1	1	2	−1	2	
4	Australia	3	0	1	2	0	5	−5	1	

Source: FIFA
14 June 1974
16:00

West Germany	1–0	Chile
Breitner 18'

Olympiastadion, West Berlin
Attendance: 81,100
Referee: Doğan Babacan (Turkey)
14 June 1974
19:30

East Germany	2–0	Australia
Curran 58' (o.g.); Streich 72'

Volksparkstadion, Hamburg
Attendance: 17,000
Referee: Youssou N'Diaye (Senegal)

18 June 1974
16:00

Australia	0–3	West Germany
		Overath 12'; Cullmann 34'; Müller 53'

Volksparkstadion, Hamburg
Attendance: 53,300
Referee: Mahmoud Mustafa Kamel (Egypt)
18 June 1974
19:30

Chile	1–1	East Germany
Ahumada 69'		Hoffmann 55'

Olympiastadion, West Berlin
Attendance: 28,300
Referee: Aurelio Angonese (Italy)

22 June 1974
16:00

Australia	0–0	Chile

Olympiastadion, West Berlin
Attendance: 17,400
Referee: Jafar Namdar (Iran)
22 June 1974
19:30

East Germany	1–0	West Germany
Sparwasser 77'

Volksparkstadion, Hamburg
Attendance: 60,200
Referee: Ramón Barreto (Uruguay)

=== Group 2 ===
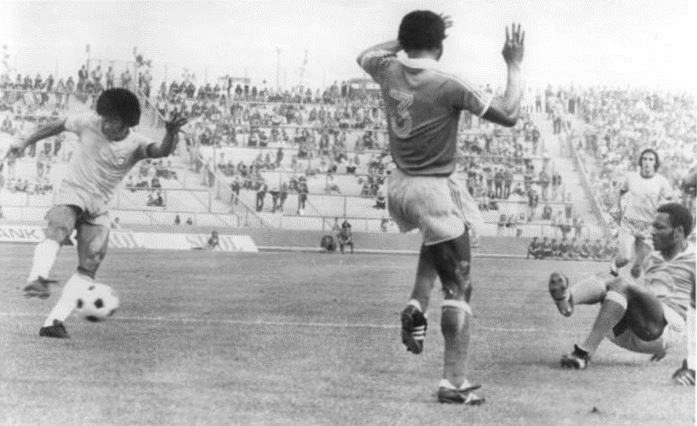
Jairzinho's goal against Zaire

Pos	Team	Pld	W	D	L	GF	GA	GD	Pts	Qualification
1	Yugoslavia	3	1	2	0	10	1	+9	4	Advance to second round
2	Brazil	3	1	2	0	3	0	+3	4	Advance to second round
3	Scotland	3	1	2	0	3	1	+2	4	
4	Zaire	3	0	0	3	0	14	−14	0	

Source: FIFA
13 June 1974
17:00 CET

Brazil	0–0	Yugoslavia

Waldstadion, Frankfurt
Attendance: 62,000
Referee: Rudolf Scheurer (Switzerland)
14 June 1974
19:30 CET

Zaire	0–2	Scotland
		Lorimer 26'; Jordan 34'

Westfalenstadion, Dortmund
Attendance: 27,000
Referee: Gerhard Schulenburg (West Germany)

18 June 1974
19:30 CET

Yugoslavia	9–0	Zaire
Bajević 8', 30', 81'; Džajić 14'; Šurjak 18'; Katalinski 22'; Bogićević 35'; Oblak 61'; Petković 65'

Parkstadion, Gelsenkirchen
Attendance: 31,700
Referee: Omar Delgado Gómez (Colombia)
18 June 1974
19:30 CET

Scotland	0–0	Brazil

Waldstadion, Frankfurt
Attendance: 62,000
Referee: Arie van Gemert (Netherlands)

22 June 1974
16:00 CET

Scotland	1–1	Yugoslavia
Jordan 88'		Karasi 81'

Waldstadion, Frankfurt
Attendance: 56,000
Referee: Alfonso González Archundía (Mexico)
22 June 1974
16:00 CET

Zaire	0–3	Brazil
		Jairzinho 12'; Rivellino 66'; Valdomiro 79'

Parkstadion, Gelsenkirchen
Attendance: 36,200
Referee: Nicolae Rainea (Romania)

=== Group 3 ===
Pos	Team	Pld	W	D	L	GF	GA	GD	Pts	Qualification
1	Netherlands	3	2	1	0	6	1	+5	5	Advance to second round
2	Sweden	3	1	2	0	3	0	+3	4	Advance to second round
3	Bulgaria	3	0	2	1	2	5	−3	2	
4	Uruguay	3	0	1	2	1	6	−5	1	

Source: FIFA
15 June 1974
16:00 CET

Uruguay	0–2	Netherlands
		Rep 7', 86'

Niedersachsenstadion, Hanover
Attendance: 55,100
Referee: Károly Palotai (Hungary)
15 June 1974
16:00 CET

Sweden	0–0	Bulgaria

Rheinstadion, Düsseldorf
Attendance: 23,800
Referee: Edison Peréz Núñez (Peru)

19 June 1974
19:30 CET

Bulgaria	1–1	Uruguay
Bonev 75'		Pavoni 87'

Niedersachsenstadion, Hanover
Attendance: 13,400
Referee: Jack Taylor (England)
19 June 1974
19:30 CET

Netherlands	0–0	Sweden

Westfalenstadion, Dortmund
Attendance: 53,700
Referee: Werner Winsemann (Canada)

23 June 1974
16:00 CET

Bulgaria	1–4	Netherlands
Krol 78' (o.g.)		Neeskens 5' (pen.), 45' (pen.); Rep 71'; De Jong 88'

Westfalenstadion, Dortmund
Attendance: 53,300
Referee: Tony Boskovic (Australia)
23 June 1974
16:00 CET

Sweden	3–0	Uruguay
Edström 46', 77'; Sandberg 74'

Rheinstadion, Düsseldorf
Attendance: 28,300
Referee: Erich Linemayr (Austria)

=== Group 4 ===
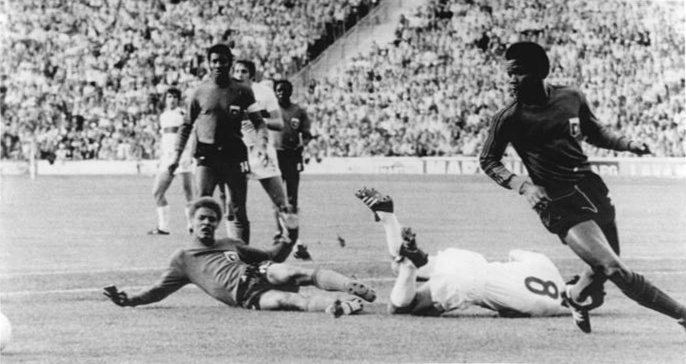
Capello (No.8) is brought down v. Haiti

Pos	Team	Pld	W	D	L	GF	GA	GD	Pts	Qualification
1	Poland	3	3	0	0	12	3	+9	6	Advance to second round
2	Argentina	3	1	1	1	7	5	+2	3	Advance to second round
3	Italy	3	1	1	1	5	4	+1	3	
4	Haiti	3	0	0	3	2	14	−12	0	

Source: FIFA
15 June 1974
18:00 CET

Italy	3–1	Haiti
Rivera 52'; Benetti 66'; Anastasi 79'		Sanon 46'

Olympiastadion, Munich
Attendance: 53,000
Referee: Vicente Llobregat (Venezuela)
15 June 1974
18:00 CET

Poland	3–2	Argentina
Lato 7', 62'; Szarmach 8'		Heredia 60'; Babington 66'

Neckarstadion, Stuttgart
Attendance: 32,700
Referee: Clive Thomas (Wales)

19 June 1974
19:30 CET

Argentina	1–1	Italy
Houseman 20'		Perfumo 35' (o.g.)

Neckarstadion, Stuttgart
Attendance: 70,100
Referee: Pavel Kazakov (Soviet Union)
19 June 1974
19:30 CET

Haiti	0–7	Poland
		Lato 17', 87'; Deyna 18'; Szarmach 30', 34', 50'; Gorgoń 31'

Olympiastadion, Munich
Attendance: 25,300
Referee: Govindasamy Suppiah (Singapore)

23 June 1974
16:00 CET

Argentina	4–1	Haiti
Yazalde 15', 68'; Houseman 18'; Ayala 55'		Sanon 63'

Olympiastadion, Munich
Attendance: 25,900
Referee: Pablo Sánchez Ibáñez (Spain)
23 June 1974
16:00 CET

Poland	2–1	Italy
Szarmach 38'; Deyna 44'		Capello 85'

Neckarstadion, Stuttgart
Attendance: 70,100
Referee: Hans-Joachim Weyland (West Germany)

== Second group stage ==
The second round, or second group stage, saw the eight teams progressing from the first round divided into two groups of four teams on the basis of the tournament regulations. Group A would consist of the winners of Groups 1 and 3, plus the runners-up from Groups 2 and 4. Group B would consist of the other four teams, namely the winners of Groups 2 and 4, plus the runners-up from Group 1 and 3. Like the first group stage, each group in the second round was a round-robin of six games, where each team played one match against each of the other teams in the same group. Teams were awarded two points for a win, one point for a draw and none for a defeat. The two teams finishing first in each group advanced to the final, while the two runners-up would advance to the match for third place.

Tie-breaking criteria

Teams were ranked on the following criteria:

1. Greater number of points in all second round group matches
2. Goal difference in all second round group matches
3. Goals scored in all second round group matches
4. Higher finishing position in the table in the first round
5. Drawing of lots by the FIFA Organising Committee

All times listed below are at local time (UTC+1)

=== Group A ===
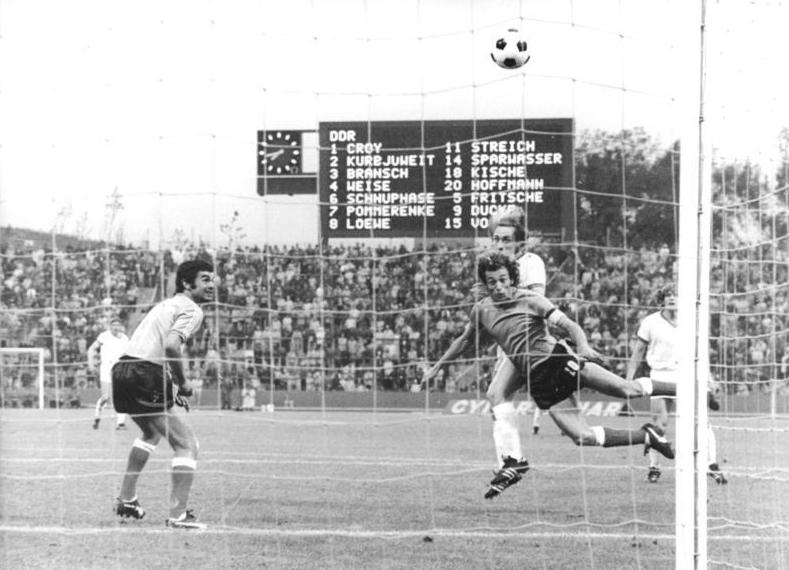
Streich heads East Germany into the lead against Argentina

Pos	Team	Pld	W	D	L	GF	GA	GD	Pts	Qualification
1	Netherlands	3	3	0	0	8	0	+8	6	Advance to final
2	Brazil	3	2	0	1	3	3	0	4	Advance to match for third place
3	East Germany	3	0	1	2	1	4	−3	1	
4	Argentina	3	0	1	2	2	7	−5	1	

Source: FIFA
26 June 1974
19:30 CET

Netherlands	4–0	Argentina
Cruyff 11', 90'; Krol 25'; Rep 73'

Parkstadion, Gelsenkirchen
Attendance: 56,548
Referee: Bob Davidson (Scotland)
26 June 1974
19:30 CET

Brazil	1–0	East Germany
Rivellino 60'

Niedersachsenstadion, Hanover
Attendance: 59,863
Referee: Clive Thomas (Wales)

30 June 1974
16:00 CET

Argentina	1–2	Brazil
Brindisi 35'		Rivellino 32'; Jairzinho 49'

Niedersachsenstadion, Hanover
Attendance: 39,400
Referee: Vital Loraux (Belgium)
30 June 1974
16:00 CET

East Germany	0–2	Netherlands
		Neeskens 7'; Rensenbrink 59'

Parkstadion, Gelsenkirchen
Attendance: 68,348
Referee: Rudolf Scheurer (Switzerland)

3 July 1974
19:30 CET

Argentina	1–1	East Germany
Houseman 20'		Streich 14'

Parkstadion, Gelsenkirchen
Attendance: 54,254
Referee: Jack Taylor (England)
3 July 1974
19:30 CET

Netherlands	2–0	Brazil
Neeskens 50'; Cruyff 65'

Westfalenstadion, Dortmund
Attendance: 53,700
Referee: Kurt Tschenscher (West Germany)

=== Group B ===
Pos	Team	Pld	W	D	L	GF	GA	GD	Pts	Qualification
1	West Germany	3	3	0	0	7	2	+5	6	Advance to final
2	Poland	3	2	0	1	3	2	+1	4	Advance to match for third place
3	Sweden	3	1	0	2	4	6	−2	2	
4	Yugoslavia	3	0	0	3	2	6	−4	0	

Source: FIFA
26 June 1974
16:00 CET

Yugoslavia	0–2	West Germany
		Breitner 39'; Müller 82'

Rheinstadion, Düsseldorf
Attendance: 67,385
Referee: Armando Marques (Brazil)
26 June 1974
19:30 CET

Sweden	0–1	Poland
		Lato 43'

Neckarstadion, Stuttgart
Attendance: 44,955
Referee: Ramón Barreto (Uruguay)

30 June 1974
16:00 CET

Poland	2–1	Yugoslavia
Deyna 24' (pen.); Lato 62'		Karasi 43'

Waldstadion, Frankfurt
Attendance: 58,000
Referee: Rudi Glöckner (East Germany)
30 June 1974
19:30 CET

West Germany	4–2	Sweden
Overath 51'; Bonhof 52'; Grabowski 76'; Hoeneß 89' (pen.)		Edström 24'; Sandberg 53'

Rheinstadion, Düsseldorf
Attendance: 67,800
Referee: Pavel Kazakov (Soviet Union)

3 July 1974
16:35 CET (Note: Originally scheduled for 16:00, the kick-off was delayed due to heavy rain, which created puddles on the pitch.)

Poland	0–1	West Germany
		Müller 76'

Waldstadion, Frankfurt
Attendance: 62,000
Referee: Erich Linemayr (Austria)
3 July 1974
19:30 CET

Sweden	2–1	Yugoslavia
Edström 29'; Torstensson 85'		Šurjak 27'

Rheinstadion, Düsseldorf
Attendance: 41,300
Referee: Luis Pestarino (Argentina)

== Knockout stage ==
The match for third place was the first match in FIFA World Cup history in which a penalty shoot-out could potentially be held (in the event of the score being level after the regular 90 minutes and 30 minutes' extra time). If the teams remained tied in the final after extra time, a replay would be held. Only if the scores remained level during the replay after the regular 90 minutes and 30 minutes' extra time would penalties be used to determine the champion. At all previous World Cup tournaments, the drawing of lots had been foreseen in this situation to split the teams, but it was never used.

All times listed below are at local time (UTC+1)

=== Match for third place ===
6 July 1974
16:00 CET

Brazil	0–1	Poland
		Lato 76'

Olympiastadion, Munich
Attendance: 77,100
Referee: Aurelio Angonese (Italy)

=== Final ===
7 July 1974
16:00 UTC+1

Netherlands	1–2	West Germany
Neeskens 2' (pen.)		Breitner 25' (pen.); Müller 43'

Olympiastadion, Munich
Attendance: 78,200
Referee: Jack Taylor (England)

== Statistics ==
=== Goalscorers ===
With seven goals, Grzegorz Lato of Poland was the top scorer in the tournament. In total, 97 goals were scored by 52 players, with two of them credited as own goals and one player scored for and against.

7 goals

- (Poland) Grzegorz Lato

5 goals

- (Netherlands) Johan Neeskens
- (Poland) Andrzej Szarmach

4 goals

- (Netherlands) Johnny Rep
- (Sweden) Ralf Edström
- (West Germany) Gerd Müller

3 goals

- (Argentina) René Houseman
- (Brazil) Rivellino
- (Netherlands) Johan Cruyff
- (Poland) Kazimierz Deyna
- (West Germany) Paul Breitner
- (Socialist Federal Republic of Yugoslavia) Dušan Bajević

2 goals

- (Argentina) Héctor Yazalde
- (Brazil) Jairzinho
- (East Germany) Joachim Streich
- (Haiti) Emmanuel Sanon
- (Scotland) Joe Jordan
- (Sweden) Roland Sandberg
- (West Germany) Wolfgang Overath
- (Socialist Federal Republic of Yugoslavia) Stanislav Karasi
- (Socialist Federal Republic of Yugoslavia) Ivica Šurjak

1 goal

- (Argentina) Rubén Ayala
- (Argentina) Carlos Babington
- (Argentina) Miguel Ángel Brindisi
- (Argentina) Ramón Heredia
- (Brazil) Valdomiro
- (Bulgaria) Hristo Bonev
- (Chile) Sergio Ahumada
- (East Germany) Martin Hoffmann
- (East Germany) Jürgen Sparwasser
- (Italy) Pietro Anastasi
- (Italy) Romeo Benetti
- (Italy) Fabio Capello
- (Italy) Gianni Rivera
- (Netherlands) Theo de Jong
- (Netherlands) Ruud Krol
- (Netherlands) Rob Rensenbrink
- (Poland) Jerzy Gorgoń
- (Scotland) Peter Lorimer
- (Sweden) Conny Torstensson
- (Uruguay) Ricardo Pavoni
- (West Germany) Rainer Bonhof
- (West Germany) Bernhard Cullmann
- (West Germany) Jürgen Grabowski
- (West Germany) Uli Hoeneß
- (Socialist Federal Republic of Yugoslavia) Vladislav Bogićević
- (Socialist Federal Republic of Yugoslavia) Dragan Džajić
- (Socialist Federal Republic of Yugoslavia) Josip Katalinski
- (Socialist Federal Republic of Yugoslavia) Branko Oblak
- (Socialist Federal Republic of Yugoslavia) Ilija Petković

Own goals

- (Argentina) Roberto Perfumo (for Italy)
- (Australia) Colin Curran (for East Germany)
- (Netherlands) Ruud Krol (for Bulgaria)

=== Team of the Tournament ===
FIFA selected the following players for the 1974 FIFA World Cup All-Star Team.

Goalkeeper	Defenders	Midfielders	Forwards
(Germany) Sepp Maier	(Germany) Franz Beckenbauer (Germany) Paul Breitner (Brazil) Marinho Chagas (Chile) Elías Figueroa (Netherlands) Ruud Krol (Germany) Berti Vogts	(Poland) Kazimierz Deyna (Netherlands) Johan Neeskens (Socialist Federal Republic of Yugoslavia) Branko Oblak	(Netherlands) Johan Cruyff (Poland) Grzegorz Lato (Germany) Wolfgang Overath (Netherlands) Rob Rensenbrink

=== Tournament ranking ===
In 1986, FIFA published a report that ranked all teams in each World Cup up to and including 1986, based on progress in the competition and overall results. The rankings for the 1974 tournament were as follows:

Per statistical convention in football, matches decided in extra time are counted as wins and losses.

Pos	Grp	Team	Pld	W	D	L	GF	GA	GD	Pts	Final result
1	1/B	West Germany (H)	7	6	0	1	13	4	+9	12	Champions
2	3/A	Netherlands	7	5	1	1	15	3	+12	11	Runners-up
3	4/B	Poland	7	6	0	1	16	5	+11	12	Third place
4	2/A	Brazil	7	3	2	2	6	4	+2	8	Fourth place
5	3/B	Sweden	6	2	2	2	7	6	+1	6	Eliminated in second group stage
6	1/A	East Germany	6	2	2	2	5	5	0	6	Eliminated in second group stage
7	2/B	Yugoslavia	6	1	2	3	12	7	+5	4	Eliminated in second group stage
8	4/A	Argentina	6	1	2	3	9	12	−3	4	Eliminated in second group stage
9	2	Scotland	3	1	2	0	3	1	+2	4	Eliminated in first group stage
10	4	Italy	3	1	1	1	5	4	+1	3	Eliminated in first group stage
11	1	Chile	3	0	2	1	1	2	−1	2	Eliminated in first group stage
12	3	Bulgaria	3	0	2	1	2	5	−3	2	Eliminated in first group stage
13	3	Uruguay	3	0	1	2	1	6	−5	1	Eliminated in first group stage
14	1	Australia	3	0	1	2	0	5	−5	1	Eliminated in first group stage
15	4	Haiti	3	0	0	3	2	14	−12	0	Eliminated in first group stage
16	2	Zaire	3	0	0	3	0	14	−14	0	Eliminated in first group stage

Source: FIFA
(H) Hosts
