= Erich Hamann =

German footballer

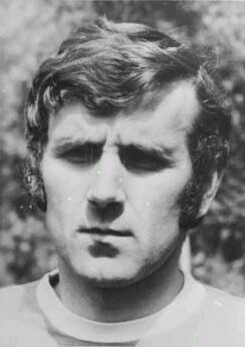
- Hamann in 1974

Personal information
- Full name: Erich Hamann
- Date of birth: 27 November 1944 (age 81)
- Place of birth: Pasewalk, Province of Pomerania, Germany
- Height: 1.74 m (5 ft 8 1/2 in)
- Position: Midfielder

Youth career
- 1958–1961: BSG Lokomotive Pasewalk
- 1961–1962: SC Neubrandenburg

Senior career*
Years	Team	Apps	(Gls)
1962–1966	SC Neubrandenburg	68	(15)
1966	Stahl Eisenhüttenstadt	21	(19)
1966–1967	ASG Vorwärts Storkow		
1967–1976	Vorwärts Frankfurt	173	(22)
1967–1976	Vorwärts Frankfurt II	3	(1)
1976–1977	BSG Traktor Groß Lindow (de)		
Total		265	(57)

International career
1962	East Germany U18 (de)	3	(0)
1964–1970	East Germany U23	7	(0)
1969–1974	East Germany	3	(0)

Managerial career
- 1985–1986: Vorwärts Frankfurt II
- 1986: Vorwärts Frankfurt
- 1996–2007: Hanse Frankfurt
- * Club domestic league appearances and goals

Erich Hamann (born 27 November 1944) is a retired German football player who played as a midfielder. He was also the manager of Vorwärts Frankfurt and Hanse Frankfurt.

== Club career ==
He played for the clubs SC Neubrandenburg and FC Vorwärts Frankfurt/Oder in the East German top-flight.

== International career ==
Hamann earned 3 caps for the East Germany national football team, and played in the 1974 FIFA World Cup, including the historic match against West Germany, where he provided the pass to Jürgen Sparwasser, who scored the only goal in the 1–0 win.

== Managerial career ==
Hamann held multiple roles at Vorwärts Frankfurt, including manager, assistant manager and reserve team manager, and was also manager at Hanse Frankfurt.
