= East Germany v West Germany (1974 FIFA World Cup) =

Football match in 1974

East Germany 1–0 West Germany
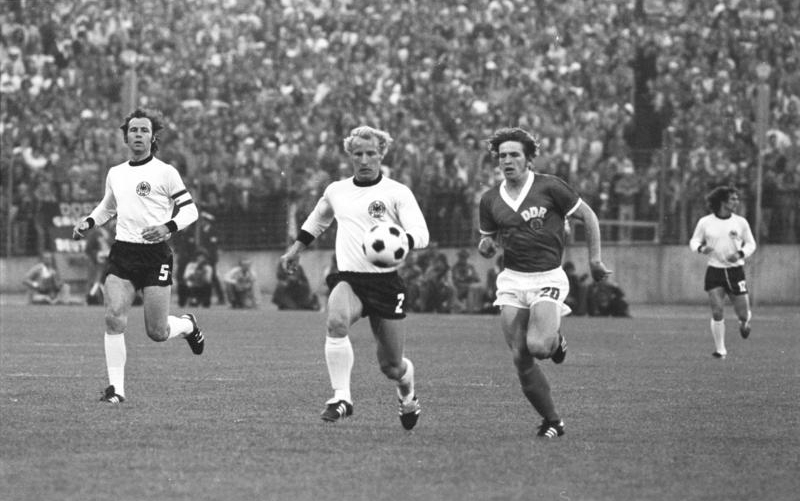
- L–R: West German players Franz Beckenbauer, Berti Vogts and in the background Wolfgang Overath, and East Germany's striker Martin Hoffmann
- Event: 1974 FIFA World Cup
East Germany	West Germany
1	0
- Date: 22 June 1974
- Venue: Volksparkstadion, Hamburg
- Referee: Ramón Barreto Ruíz (Uruguay)
- Attendance: 60,200

On 22 June 1974, East Germany played West Germany in Hamburg as part of the first group stage of the 1974 FIFA World Cup. East Germany won the match 1–0, in what is regarded as one of the greatest upsets in FIFA World Cup history. The match is also the only time East and West Germany ever played each other in top-level senior international competition.

== Background ==
Going into the match, both East and West Germany were already assured of progressing to the second round. East Germany had defeated Australia 2–0 and drawn with Chile 1–1. Host nation West Germany had beaten Chile 1–0 and Australia 3–0, which some fans had seen as unconvincing. West Germany were considered by pundits to be clear favorites.

According to journalist Ulrich Hesse, West German players knew that their manager Helmut Schön, who had been born in Dresden in East Germany, "wanted – no, needed – to win this match at all costs". The East German government viewed the match as a class struggle and politically significant, according to author Thomas Blees.

The senior national teams of East and West Germany had never met before, though the countries did play each other at the 1972 Summer Olympics in Munich, where West Germany was represented by an amateur side. East Germany won this game 3–2.

== Match ==
=== Summary ===
West Germany dominated the early chances, though East Germany also had scoring opportunities, including by Hans-Jürgen Kreische who missed an open goal at close range. West German Gerd Müller subsequently hit the post. In the 77th minute, East German Jürgen Sparwasser received a long diagonal pass and ran toward the West German goal, shooting the ball over goalkeeper Sepp Maier into the roof of the net. Sparwasser did a somersault in celebration, and later said it was the first time he had ever done one.

Around 1,500 East German citizens attended the match, including hundreds of Stasi members, who were instructed to cheer on East Germany with the chant "7, 8, 9, 10, Klasse!" ("7, 8, 9, 10, Great!").

=== Details ===
22 June 1974
19:30

East Germany	1–0	West Germany
Sparwasser 77'

Volksparkstadion, Hamburg
Attendance: 60,200
Referee: Ramón Barreto (Uruguay)

East Germany	West Germany

GK	1	Jürgen Croy	(yellow card) 81'
SW	3	Bernd Bransch (c)
RB	18	Gerd Kische
CB	4	Konrad Weise
LB	12	Siegmar Wätzlich
CM	13	Reinhard Lauck
CM	16	Harald Irmscher		(substituted off) 65'
CM	2	Lothar Kurbjuweit
AM	10	Hans-Jürgen Kreische	(yellow card) 84'
CF	14	Jürgen Sparwasser	(yellow card) 27'
CF	20	Martin Hoffmann
Substitutions:
CM	17	Erich Hamann		(substituted on) 65'
Manager:
Georg Buschner

GK	1	Sepp Maier
SW	5	Franz Beckenbauer (c)
RB	2	Berti Vogts
CB	4	Hans-Georg Schwarzenbeck	(substituted off) 68'
LB	3	Paul Breitner
CM	14	Uli Hoeneß
CM	8	Bernhard Cullmann
CM	12	Wolfgang Overath	(substituted off) 69'
RW	9	Jürgen Grabowski
LW	15	Heinz Flohe
CF	13	Gerd Müller
Substitutions:
CB	6	Horst-Dieter Höttges	(substituted on) 68'
CM	10	Günter Netzer	(substituted on) 69'
Manager:
Helmut Schön

Linesmen:
Armando Marques (Brazil)
Luis Pestarino (Argentina)

Match rules:

- 90 minutes
- Maximum of two substitutions

== Aftermath ==
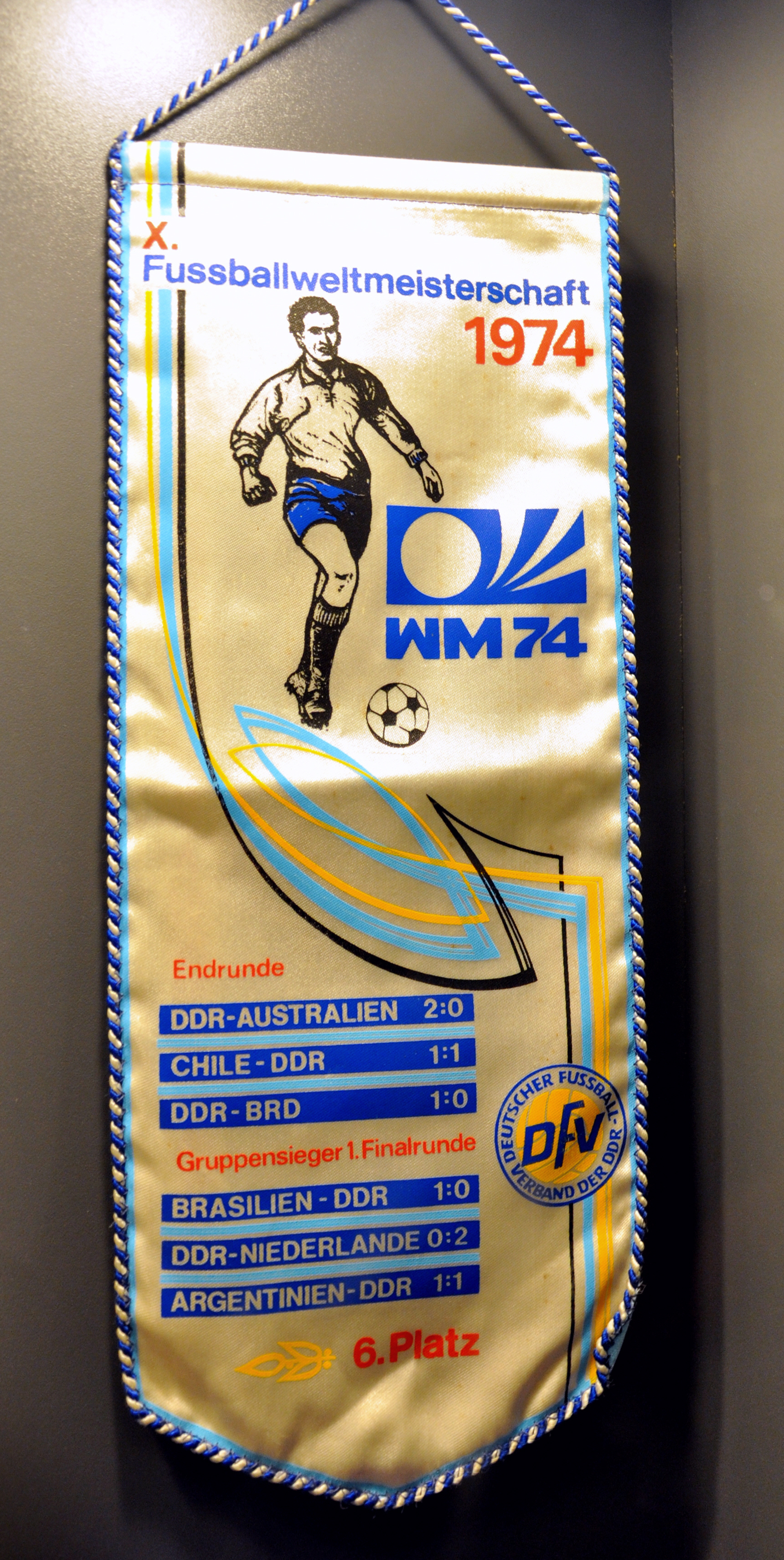
Pennant commemorating the East German 1974 World Cup team in DDR museum.

The players of both teams swapped shirts after the match, though not on the pitch as this was officially forbidden.

According to West German striker Gerd Müller, "all hell broke loose" in the West German training camp after the loss. East Germany's win gave them the top spot in their group, but paradoxically resulted in them getting a more difficult group in the second round. East Germany was eliminated in the second round, while West Germany went on to win the entire tournament.

Sparwasser became a national hero in East Germany, with his goal simply being known as "The Sparwasser Goal". In 1988, Sparwasser defected to West Germany. Sparwasser later said that "If one day my gravestone simply says 'Hamburg 74', everybody will still know who is lying below". East Germans used to commonly ask each other "Where were you when Sparwasser scored?".

East German striker Hans-Jürgen Kreische met West German politician Hans Apel on a flight immediately after the game, and the two men made an informal bet – Kreische correctly predicted the West would win the trophy and Apel sent him some whisky, unaware of the difficulties this would cause. Kreische later found he had been excluded from the subsequent national squad for the 1976 Olympic Games due to the Stasi being aware of his correspondence with Apel, which was forbidden by the East German authorities.

The match is considered to be one of the most politically charged to ever take place in the World Cup. East and West Germany would never play each other again.

== See also ==
- East Germany–West Germany football rivalry
