= List of international goals scored by Miroslav Klose =

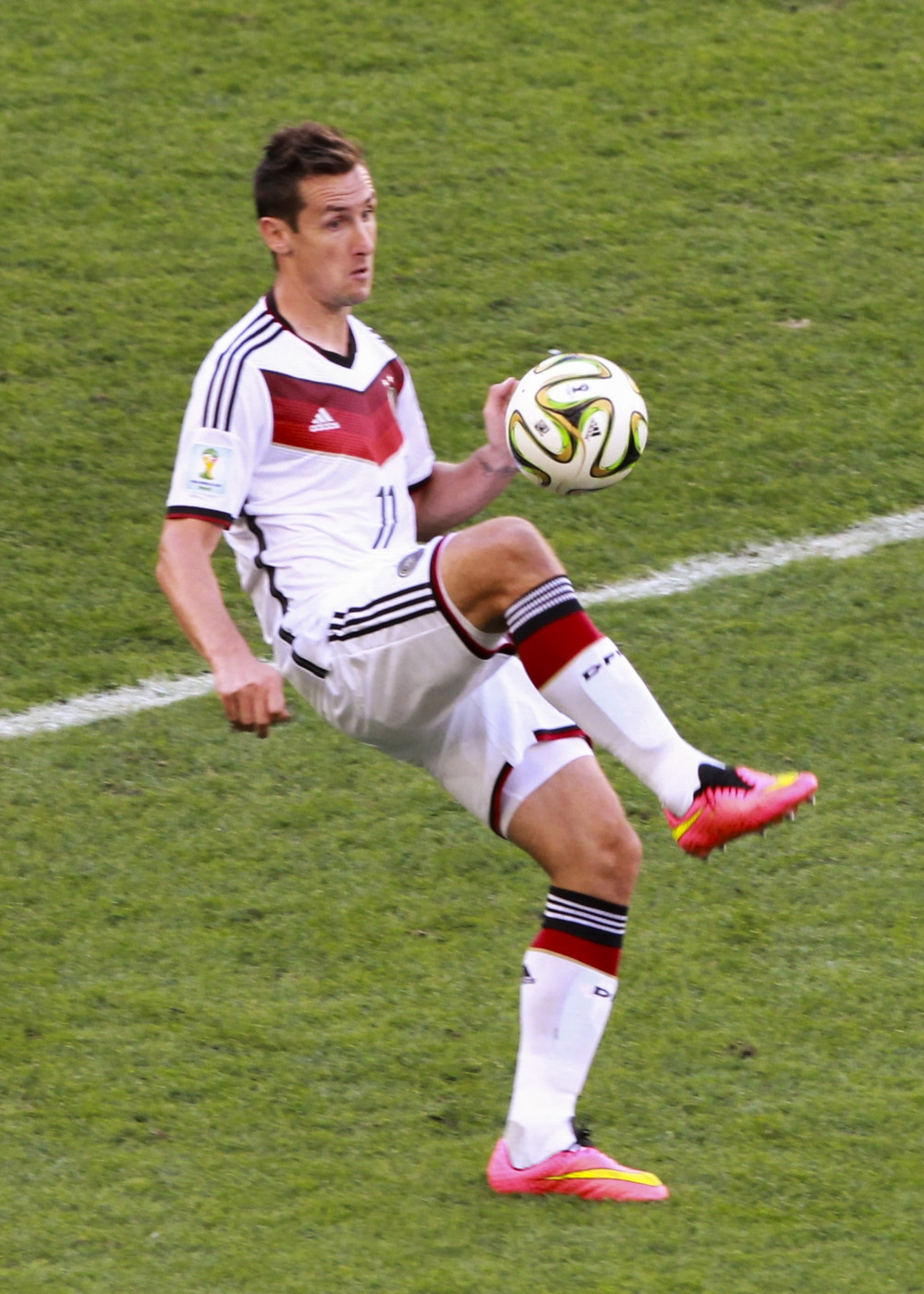
Klose playing for Germany in the 2014 World Cup final

Miroslav Klose is the all-time top scorer for the Germany national football team, with 71 goals in 137 games between 2001 and 2014. He is also the third-highest scorer in the history of the FIFA World Cup, with 16 goals in 24 appearances across four editions from 2002 to 2014. In the 13 years that Klose played for the national team, Germany never lost a game in which he scored.

Klose scored on his debut for Germany, a 2–1 win over Albania on 24 March 2001 during qualification for the 2002 FIFA World Cup. On 13 February 2002, he scored his first international hat-trick, in a 7–1 win over Israel at his then club ground, the Fritz-Walter-Stadion in Kaiserslautern; this was followed by another treble on 18 May in a 6–2 win against Austria. At his first tournament finals, the 2002 FIFA World Cup in South Korea and Japan, Klose scored five goals to become the tournament's joint second top scorer, alongside Brazil's Rivaldo and behind Ronaldo. All of his goals came in the group stage, starting with a headed hat-trick in an 8–0 win against Saudi Arabia at the Sapporo Dome.

Klose netted two goals in the opening game of the 2006 FIFA World Cup, a 4–2 win against Costa Rica, and scored another brace in Germany's final group stage match, a 3–0 win against Ecuador. He finished his second World Cup again with five goals to take the FIFA World Cup Golden Shoe. On 10 September 2008, during the 2010 FIFA World Cup qualification, he scored the last of his four international hat-tricks, earning a 3–3 draw away to Finland. He scored four goals at the finals in South Africa, including two in a 4–0 quarter-final win over Argentina on his 100th cap. On 6 June 2014, Klose scored his 69th goal in 132 games in a 6–1 friendly win over Armenia in Mainz, surpassing Gerd Müller's record of 68 goals in 62 games from 1966 to 1974. Klose added two more goals in Germany's victory at the 2014 FIFA World Cup to retire with a record of 71 goals in 137 games. His final goal came in their 7–1 semi-final victory over hosts Brazil, taking him to 16 World Cup goals and surpassing Ronaldo as the tournament's record goalscorer.

In addition to his 16 goals in World Cup finals, Klose scored another 13 in qualification games, as well as three goals in UEFA European Championship finals and 16 in that tournament's qualification matches. The remainder of his goals, 23, were scored in friendly matches. He scored six times against Austria, his highest tally against one country, and also totalled five goals against Azerbaijan and Sweden.

== International goals ==
"Score" represents the score in the match after Klose's goal. "Score" and "Result" list Germany's goal tally first.

International goals scored by Miroslav Klose
No.	Date	Cap	Venue	Opponent	Score	Result	Competition	Ref.
1.	24 March 2001	1	BayArena, Leverkusen, Germany	Albania	2–1	2–1	2002 FIFA World Cup qualification	
2.	28 March 2001	2	Olympic Stadium, Athens, Greece	Greece	3–2	4–2	2002 FIFA World Cup qualification	
3.	13 February 2002	8	Fritz-Walter-Stadion, Kaiserslautern, Germany	Israel	1–1	7–1	Friendly	
4.	13 February 2002	8	Fritz-Walter-Stadion, Kaiserslautern, Germany	Israel	2–1	7–1	Friendly	
5.	13 February 2002	8	Fritz-Walter-Stadion, Kaiserslautern, Germany	Israel	4–1	7–1	Friendly	
6.	18 May 2002	12	BayArena, Leverkusen, Germany	Austria	1–0	6–2	Friendly	
7.	18 May 2002	12	BayArena, Leverkusen, Germany	Austria	2–0	6–2	Friendly	
8.	18 May 2002	12	BayArena, Leverkusen, Germany	Austria	4–2	6–2	Friendly	
9.	1 June 2002	13	Sapporo Dome, Sapporo, Japan	Saudi Arabia	1–0	8–0	2002 FIFA World Cup	
10.	1 June 2002	13	Sapporo Dome, Sapporo, Japan	Saudi Arabia	2–0	8–0	2002 FIFA World Cup	
11.	1 June 2002	13	Sapporo Dome, Sapporo, Japan	Saudi Arabia	5–0	8–0	2002 FIFA World Cup	
12.	5 June 2002	14	Kashima Soccer Stadium, Kashima, Japan	Republic of Ireland	1–0	1–1	2002 FIFA World Cup	
13.	11 June 2002	15	Ecopa Stadium, Shizuoka, Japan	Cameroon	2–0	2–0	2002 FIFA World Cup	
14.	16 October 2002	23	AWD-Arena, Hannover, Germany	Faroe Islands	2–1	2–1	UEFA Euro 2004 qualifying	
15.	11 June 2003	29	Tórsvøllur, Tórshavn, Faroe Islands	Faroe Islands	1–0	2–0	UEFA Euro 2004 qualifying	
16.	18 February 2004	35	Stadion Poljud, Split, Croatia	Croatia	1–0	2–1	Friendly	
17.	17 November 2004	43	Zentralstadion, Leipzig, Germany	Cameroon	2–0	3–0	Friendly	
18.	17 November 2004	43	Zentralstadion, Leipzig, Germany	Cameroon	3–0	3–0	Friendly	
19.	16 December 2004	44	International Stadium Yokohama, Yokohama, Japan	Japan	1–0	3–0	Friendly	
20.	16 December 2004	44	International Stadium Yokohama, Yokohama, Japan	Japan	3–0	3–0	Friendly	
21.	22 March 2006	52	Westfalenstadion, Dortmund, Germany	United States	3–0	4–1	Friendly	
22.	27 May 2006	53	Schwarzwald-Stadion, Freiburg, Germany	Luxembourg	1–0	7–0	Friendly	
23.	27 May 2006	53	Schwarzwald-Stadion, Freiburg, Germany	Luxembourg	4–0	7–0	Friendly	
24.	30 May 2006	54	BayArena, Leverkusen, Germany	Japan	1–2	2–2	Friendly	
25.	9 June 2006	56	Allianz Arena, Munich, Germany	Costa Rica	2–1	4–2	2006 FIFA World Cup	
26.	9 June 2006	56	Allianz Arena, Munich, Germany	Costa Rica	3–1	4–2	2006 FIFA World Cup	
27.	20 June 2006	58	Olympiastadion, Berlin, Germany	Ecuador	1–0	3–0	2006 FIFA World Cup	
28.	20 June 2006	58	Olympiastadion, Berlin, Germany	Ecuador	2–0	3–0	2006 FIFA World Cup	
29.	30 June 2006	60	Olympiastadion, Berlin, Germany	Argentina	1–1	1–1	2006 FIFA World Cup	
30.	16 August 2006	63	Veltins-Arena, Gelsenkirchen, Germany	Sweden	2–0	3–0	Friendly	
31.	16 August 2006	63	Veltins-Arena, Gelsenkirchen, Germany	Sweden	3–0	3–0	Friendly	
32.	6 September 2006	65	Stadio Olimpico, Serravalle, San Marino	San Marino	3–0	13–0	UEFA Euro 2008 qualifying	
33.	6 September 2006	65	Stadio Olimpico, Serravalle, San Marino	San Marino	5–0	13–0	UEFA Euro 2008 qualifying	
34.	8 September 2007	70	Millennium Stadium, Cardiff, Wales	Wales	1–0	2–0	UEFA Euro 2008 qualifying	
35.	8 September 2007	70	Millennium Stadium, Cardiff, Wales	Wales	2–0	2–0	UEFA Euro 2008 qualifying	
36.	17 November 2007	71	AWD-Arena, Hannover, Germany	Cyprus	2–0	4–0	UEFA Euro 2008 qualifying	
37.	6 February 2008	73	Ernst-Happel-Stadion, Vienna, Austria	Austria	2–0	3–0	Friendly	
38.	26 March 2008	74	St. Jakob-Park, Basel, Switzerland	Switzerland	1–0	4–0	Friendly	
39.	27 May 2008	75	Fritz-Walter-Stadion, Kaiserslautern, Germany	Belarus	1–0	2–2	Friendly	
40.	19 June 2008	79	St. Jakob-Park, Basel, Switzerland	Portugal	2–0	3–2	UEFA Euro 2008	
41.	25 June 2008	80	St. Jakob-Park, Basel, Switzerland	Turkey	2–1	3–2	UEFA Euro 2008	
42.	10 September 2008	84	Helsinki Olympic Stadium, Helsinki, Finland	Finland	1–1	3–3	2010 FIFA World Cup qualification	
43.	10 September 2008	84	Helsinki Olympic Stadium, Helsinki, Finland	Finland	2–2	3–3	2010 FIFA World Cup qualification	
44.	10 September 2008	84	Helsinki Olympic Stadium, Helsinki, Finland	Finland	3–3	3–3	2010 FIFA World Cup qualification	
45.	12 August 2009	89	Tofiq Bahramov Stadium, Baku, Azerbaijan	Azerbaijan	2–0	2–0	2010 FIFA World Cup qualification	
46.	9 September 2009	91	AWD-Arena, Hannover, Germany	Azerbaijan	2–0	4–0	2010 FIFA World Cup qualification	
47.	9 September 2009	91	AWD-Arena, Hannover, Germany	Azerbaijan	3–0	4–0	2010 FIFA World Cup qualification	
48.	10 October 2009	92	Luzhniki Stadium, Moscow, Russia	Russia	1–0	1–0	2010 FIFA World Cup qualification	
49.	13 June 2010	97	Moses Mabhida Stadium, Durban, South Africa	Australia	2–0	4–0	2010 FIFA World Cup	
50.	27 June 2010	99	Free State Stadium, Bloemfontein, South Africa	England	1–0	4–1	2010 FIFA World Cup	
51.	3 July 2010	100	Cape Town Stadium, Cape Town, South Africa	Argentina	2–0	4–0	2010 FIFA World Cup	
52.	3 July 2010	100	Cape Town Stadium, Cape Town, South Africa	Argentina	4–0	4–0	2010 FIFA World Cup	
53.	3 September 2010	102	King Baudouin Stadium, Brussels, Belgium	Belgium	1–0	1–0	UEFA Euro 2012 qualifying	
54.	7 September 2010	103	RheinEnergieStadion, Cologne, Germany	Azerbaijan	3–0	6–1	UEFA Euro 2012 qualifying	
55.	7 September 2010	103	RheinEnergieStadion, Cologne, Germany	Azerbaijan	6–1	6–1	UEFA Euro 2012 qualifying	
56.	8 October 2010	104	Olympiastadion, Berlin, Germany	Turkey	1–0	3–0	UEFA Euro 2012 qualifying	
57.	8 October 2010	104	Olympiastadion, Berlin, Germany	Turkey	3–0	3–0	UEFA Euro 2012 qualifying	
58.	12 October 2010	105	Astana Arena, Astana, Kazakhstan	Kazakhstan	1–0	3–0	UEFA Euro 2012 qualifying	
59.	9 February 2011	106	Westfalenstadion, Dortmund, Germany	Italy	1–0	1–1	Friendly	
60.	26 March 2011	107	Fritz-Walter-Stadion, Kaiserslautern, Germany	Kazakhstan	1–0	4–0	UEFA Euro 2012 qualifying	
61.	26 March 2011	107	Fritz-Walter-Stadion, Kaiserslautern, Germany	Kazakhstan	4–0	4–0	UEFA Euro 2012 qualifying	
62.	2 September 2011	111	Veltins-Arena, Gelsenkirchen, Germany	Austria	1–0	6–2	UEFA Euro 2012 qualifying	
63.	15 November 2011	113	Volksparkstadion, Hamburg, Germany	Netherlands	2–0	3–0	Friendly	
64.	22 June 2012	120	PGE Arena Gdańsk, Gdańsk, Poland	Greece	3–1	4–2	UEFA Euro 2012	
65.	12 October 2012	125	Aviva Stadium, Dublin, Republic of Ireland	Republic of Ireland	4–0	6–1	2014 FIFA World Cup qualification	
66.	16 October 2012	126	Olympiastadion, Berlin, Germany	Sweden	1–0	4–4	2014 FIFA World Cup qualification	
67.	16 October 2012	126	Olympiastadion, Berlin, Germany	Sweden	2–0	4–4	2014 FIFA World Cup qualification	
68.	6 September 2013	129	Allianz Arena, Munich, Germany	Austria	1–0	3–0	2014 FIFA World Cup qualification	
69.	6 June 2014	132	Coface Arena, Mainz, Germany	Armenia	4–1	6–1	Friendly	
70.	21 June 2014	133	Estádio Castelão, Fortaleza, Brazil	Ghana	2–2	2–2	2014 FIFA World Cup	
71.	8 July 2014	136	Estádio Mineirão, Belo Horizonte, Brazil	Brazil	2–0	7–1	2014 FIFA World Cup	

== Hat-tricks ==
No.	Opponent	Goals	Score	Venue	Competition	Date
1	Israel	3 – (1–0', 2–1', 4–1')	7–1	Fritz-Walter-Stadion, Kaiserslautern, Germany	Friendly	13 February 2002
2	Austria	3 – (1–0', 2–0', 4–2')	6–2	BayArena, Leverkusen, Germany	Friendly	18 May 2002
3	Saudi Arabia	3 – (1–0', 2–0', 5–0')	8–0	Sapporo Dome, Sapporo, Japan	2002 FIFA World Cup	1 June 2002
4	Finland	3 – (1–1', 2–2', 3–3')	3–3	Helsinki Olympic Stadium, Helsinki, Finland	2010 FIFA World Cup qualification	10 September 2008

== Breakdown ==
=== By year ===
Goals by year
Germany
Year	Caps	Goals
2001	7	2
2002	17	12
2003	10	1
2004	11	5
2005	5	0
2006	17	13
2007	5	3
2008	15	8
2009	6	4
2010	12	10
2011	8	5
2012	13	4
2013	4	1
2014	7	3
Total	137	71

=== By competition ===
Goals by competition
Competition	Caps	Goals
FIFA World Cup qualification	19	13
FIFA World Cup tournaments	24	16
UEFA European Championship qualifying	23	16
UEFA European Championship tournaments	13	3
Friendlies	58	23
Total	137	71

Goals by opposition
Opposition	Goals
Austria	6
Azerbaijan	5
Sweden	4
Argentina	3
Cameroon	3
Finland	3
Israel	3
Japan	3
Kazakhstan	3
Saudi Arabia	3
Turkey	3
Costa Rica	2
Ecuador	2
Faroe Islands	2
Greece	2
Luxembourg	2
Republic of Ireland	2
San Marino	2
Wales	2
Albania	1
Armenia	1
Australia	1
Belarus	1
Belgium	1
Brazil	1
Croatia	1
Cyprus	1
England	1
Ghana	1
Italy	1
Netherlands	1
Portugal	1
Russia	1
Switzerland	1
United States	1
Total	71

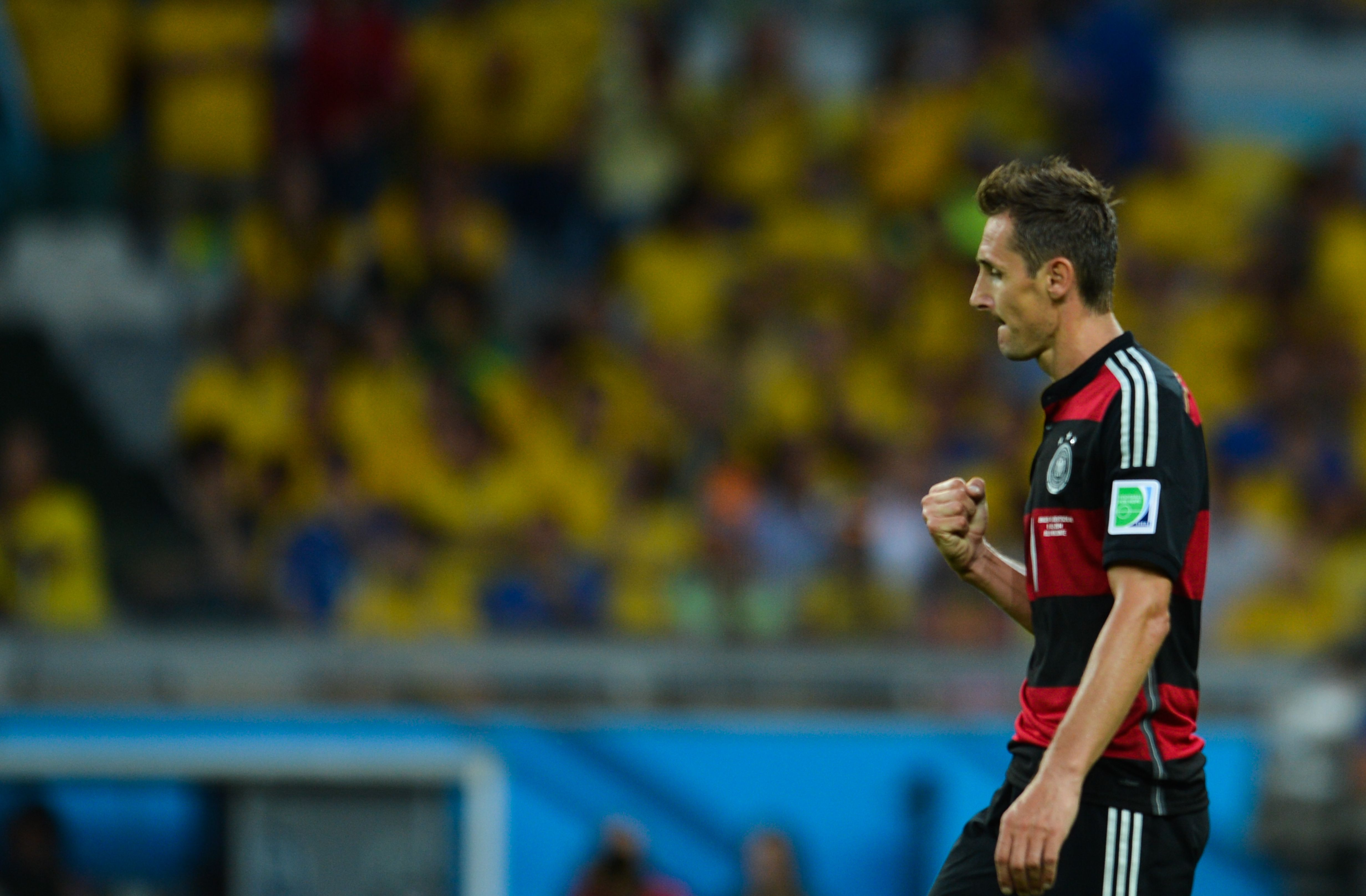
Klose celebrating his record-breaking 16th World Cup goal

== See also ==
- List of men's footballers with 50 or more international goals
- List of FIFA World Cup hat-tricks
