= Ulrich Hesse =

German author, journalist and editor

- Born: Ulrich Hesse-Lichtenberger; 1966 (age 59–60); Dortmund, West Germany
- Occupations: Author, journalist, editor

Ulrich "Uli" Hesse, also ~ Hesse-Lichtenberger, (born 1966 in Dortmund) is a German author, journalist and editor.

== Life and work ==
He graduated from Bochum University in 1994, having written his M.A. thesis about baseball. He has covered popular music for fanzines and magazines, such as the German edition of Rolling Stone, but primarily writes about sports, predominantly (association) football.

Hesse has published articles in newspapers and magazines in a variety of countries, including England, United States, Sweden, Japan and Israel, and was the editor of the German-language edition of Champions, the official UEFA Champions League magazine, for which he worked as a contributing editor until the publication's demise in 2015. Between 2002 and 2016, he was a regular columnist for ESPN FC (formerly ESPNsoccernet), which has been called the world's most popular football website. In September 2016, he joined the editorial staff of 11 Freunde magazine, Germany's biggest football monthly.

So far, Hesse has published nine books. Tor! The Story of German Football (2002) was the first extensive English-language history of German football and has since been translated into Japanese, Danish and Polish. It was named the sixth best football book of all time by FourFourTwo magazine in 2016. Two of his German-language books were nominated for the Football Book of the Year Award. His English-language book about Borussia Dortmund and their support, Building the Yellow Wall, won the 2019 British Sports Book Award for Best Football Book.

Hesse is a Borussia Dortmund season ticket holder. He has listed the novelty song "Jilted John" by Jilted John as his all-time favourite 7" A-side and the punk rock classic "Born to Lose" by the Heartbreakers as the greatest-ever 7" B-side. For more than a decade he published as "Hesse-Lichtenberger", a name acquired through marriage. In October 2009 he went back to his birth name and now usually publishes as Uli Hesse.

== Publications ==
- Tor! The Story of German Football (2002) Hardcover edition
- Tor! The Story of German Football (2003) Extended paperback edition
- Tor! The Story of German Football (2005) Japanese hardcover edition
- Flutlicht und Schatten: Die Geschichte des Europapokals (2005)
- Wie Österreich Weltmeister wurde. 111 unglaubliche Fußballgeschichten (2008)
- Mesut Özil: Auf dem Weg zum Weltstar (2012) with Andreas Spohr and Heiko Buschmann
- Tor! The Story of German Football (2012) Danish edition
- Unser ganzes Leben - Die Fans des BVB (2013) with Gregor Schnittker
- Who Invented the Stepover? (2013) with Paul Simpson
- Tor! The Story of German Football (2013) Revised and updated edition
- Tor! The Story of German Football (2014) Polish edition
- Who Invented the Bicycle Kick? (2014) with Paul Simpson
- Wer erfand den Übersteiger? (2015) with Paul Simpson
- Alles BVB! Unverzichtbares Wissen rund um die Schwarzgelben (2016)
- Bayern: Creating a Global Superclub (2016)
- Bayern München (2016) Dutch edition
- Bayern: Globalny Superklub (2018) Polish edition
- Bayern (2018) Hungarian edition
- Building the Yellow Wall: The Incredible Rise and Cult Appeal of Borussia Dortmund (2018)
- Borussia Dortmund: Siła żółtej ściany (2019) Polish edition
- Így épült a Sárga Fal – A Borussia Dortmund hihetetlen felemelkedése és kulturális jelentősége (2021) Hungarian edition
- Tor! The Story of German Football (2022) New revised and updated edition
- The Three Lives of the Kaiser – A Biography of Franz Beckenbauer (2023)
