= Germany national football team =

Men's association football team

Germany
- Nickname(s): DFB-Team (DFB Team); Die Nationalelf (The National Eleven); DFB-Elf (DFB Eleven); Die Mannschaft (The Team) (Note: In Germany, the team is typically referred to as Die Nationalmannschaft (The national team), DFB-Team, DFB-Elf (DFB eleven), DFB-Auswahl (DFB selection) or Nationalelf (National eleven). Whereas in foreign media, they are regularly described as Die Mannschaft (The Team). As of June 2015, this was acknowledged by the DFB as official branding of the team. In July 2022 the German Football Association abolished this branding as an official nickname, due to rejection by many German fans.)
- Association: Deutscher Fußball-Bund (DFB)
- Confederation: UEFA (Europe)
- Head coach: Jürgen Klopp
- Captain: Joshua Kimmich
- Most caps: Lothar Matthäus (150)
- Top scorer: Miroslav Klose (71)
- Home stadium: Various
- FIFA code: GER
First colours	Second colours	Third colours

FIFA ranking
- Current: 11 ▲2 (18 November 2026)
- Highest: 1 (December 1992 – August 1993, December 1993 – March 1994, June 1994, July 2014 – June 2015, July 2017, September 2017 – June 2018)
- Lowest: 22 (March 2006)

First international
- Switzerland 5–3 Germany (Basel, Switzerland; 5 April 1908)

Biggest win
- Germany 16–0 Russian Empire (Stockholm, Sweden; 1 July 1912)

Biggest defeat
- England Amateurs 9–0 Germany (Oxford, England; 13 March 1909) (Note: This match is not considered to be a full international by the English FA, and does not appear in the records of the England team.)

World Cup
- Appearances: 21 (first in 1934)
- Best result: Champions (1954, 1974, 1990, 2014)

European Championship
- Appearances: 14 (first in 1972)
- Best result: Champions (1972, 1980, 1996)

Nations League Finals
- Appearances: 1 (first in 2025)
- Best result: Fourth place (2025)

Olympic Games
- Appearances: 8 (Note: By Germany national team (as West Germany from 1950 to 1990).) (first in 1912)
- Best result: Bronze medal (1988)

Confederations Cup
- Appearances: 3 (first in 1999)
- Best result: Champions (2017)
Medal record
Men's football
FIFA World Cup
Gold medal – first place	1954 Switzerland	Team
Gold medal – first place	1974 West Germany	Team
Gold medal – first place	1990 Italy	Team
Gold medal – first place	2014 Brazil	Team
Silver medal – second place	1966 England	Team
Silver medal – second place	1982 Spain	Team
Silver medal – second place	1986 Mexico	Team
Silver medal – second place	2002 South Korea and Japan	Team
Bronze medal – third place	1934 Italy	Team
Bronze medal – third place	1970 Mexico	Team
Bronze medal – third place	2006 Germany	Team
Bronze medal – third place	2010 South Africa	Team
FIFA Confederations Cup
Gold medal – first place	2017 Russia	Team
Bronze medal – third place	2005 Germany	Team
UEFA European Championship
Gold medal – first place	1972 Belgium	Team
Gold medal – first place	1980 Italy	Team
Gold medal – first place	1996 England	Team
Silver medal – second place	1976 Yugoslavia	Team
Silver medal – second place	1992 Sweden	Team
Silver medal – second place	2008 Austria and Switzerland	Team
Olympics Games
Bronze medal – third place	1988 Seoul	Team
- Website: dfb.de (in German)

The Germany national football team (German: Deutsche Fußballnationalmannschaft) represents Germany in men's international football and played its first match in 1908. The team is governed by the German Football Association (Deutscher Fußball-Bund (DFB)), founded in 1900, by members the single largest national sports federation in the world. Between 1949 and 1990, separate German national teams were recognised by FIFA due to Allied occupation and division: the DFB's team representing the Federal Republic of Germany (commonly referred to as West Germany in English between 1949 and 1990), the Saarland team representing the Saar Protectorate (1950–1956) and the East Germany team representing the German Democratic Republic (1952–1990). The latter two were absorbed along with their records; the present team represents the reunified Federal Republic. The official name and code "Germany FR (FRG)" was shortened to "Germany (GER)" following reunification in 1990.

Germany is one of the most successful national teams in international competitions, having won four FIFA World Cups (1954, 1974, 1990, and 2014), tied with Italy, and only one fewer than the most successful team, Brazil. They have been runners-up at the World Cup four times and have a further four third-place finishes. They are the only national football team to achieve this. Having won three European Championships (1972, 1980, and 1996) Germany is second behind Spain, the record holder in that international competition with four. Germany also won the FIFA Confederations Cup in 2017. They have been runners-up at European Championship three times, sharing this lead with the Soviet Union. East Germany won Olympic Gold in 1976. Germany was the first, and is one of only two nations to have won both the FIFA World Cup and the FIFA Women's World Cup (the other being Spain). By combined World Cups, Germany stands as the most successful football nation in history with six World Cups – four for the men's team and two for the women's. At the end of the 2014 World Cup, Germany earned the second highest Elo rating of any national football team in history, with 2,223 points. Germany is the only European nation that has won a FIFA World Cup in South America. The most notable German football rivalries on international level are the ones with the Netherlands, with Italy and with England.

== History ==
=== Early years (1899–1942) ===
On 18 April 1897, an early international game on German soil was played in Hamburg when a selection team from the Danish Football Association defeated a selection team from the Hamburg-Altona Football Association, 5–0.

Between 1899 and 1901, prior to the formation of a national team, there were five international matches between Germany and English selection teams, which are today not recognised as official by either nation's football association (in part because England fielded their amateur side, which was an overflow or B team). All five matches ended in large defeats for the Germany teams, including a 12–0 loss at White Hart Lane in September 1901.

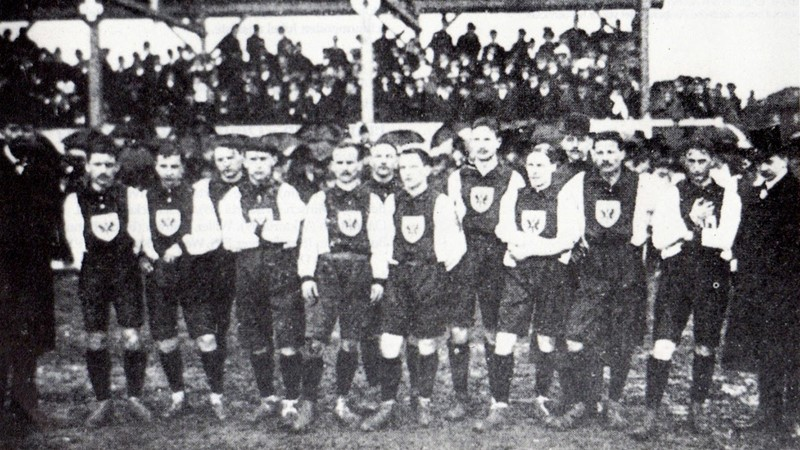
Germany national team at its first official international match in 1908

Eight years after the establishment of the German Football Association (DFB) in 1900, the first official match of the Germany national football team (Note: In early times it was simply called "die 11 besten Spieler von Deutschland" or just "die Bundesauswahl" (the Federation XI). Tags like "National team" or "National XI" weren't introduced until after World War I) was played on 5 April 1908, against Switzerland in Basel, with the Swiss winning 5–3.

A follow-up to the earlier series between England Amateurs and Germany occurred in March 1909 at Oxford's White House Ground and resulted in Germany's largest official defeat to date: 9–0 (this time, the match was recognised and recorded as official by the DFB but not by the FA, again due to the amateur side being fielded). These early confrontations formed the beginning of the rich rivalry between the two teams: one of the longest and most enduring international rivalries in football.

Julius Hirsch was the first Jewish player to represent the Germany national football team, which he joined in 1911. Hirsch scored four goals for Germany against the Netherlands in 1912, becoming the first German to score four goals in a single match.

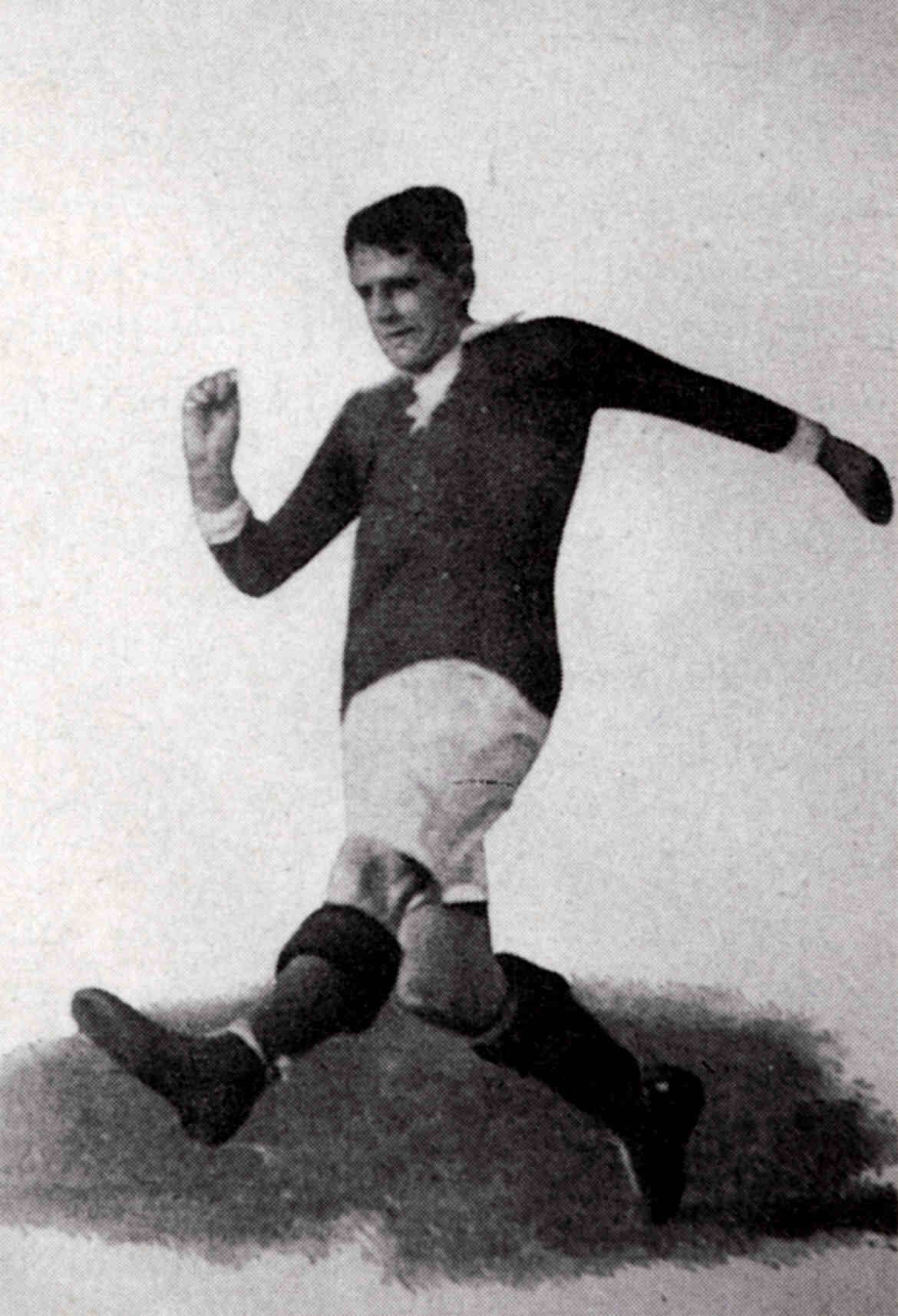
Forward Gottfried Fuchs, key player for Germany at the 1912 Olympic Games

Gottfried Fuchs scored a world record 10 goals for Germany in a 16–0 win against Russia at the 1912 Olympics in Stockholm on 1 July, becoming the top scorer of the tournament; his international record was not surpassed until 2001 when Australia's Archie Thompson scored 13 goals in a 31–0 defeat of American Samoa. He was Jewish, and the German Football Association erased all references to him from their records between 1933 and 1945. As of 2026, he was still the top German scorer for one match.

At that time the players were selected by the DFB, as there was no dedicated coach. The first manager of the Germany national team was Otto Nerz, a school teacher from Mannheim, who served in the role from 1926 to 1936. The German FA could not afford travel to Uruguay for the first World Cup staged in 1930 during the Great Depression, but finished third in the 1934 World Cup in their first appearance in the competition. After a poor showing at the 1936 Olympic Games in Berlin, Sepp Herberger became coach. In 1937 he put together a squad which was soon nicknamed the Breslau Elf (the Breslau Eleven) in recognition of their 8–0 win over Denmark in the then German city of Breslau, Lower Silesia (now Wrocław, Poland).

After Austria became part of Germany in the Anschluss of March 1938, the Austrian national team – one of Europe's best sides at the time due to professionalism – was disbanded despite having already qualified for the 1938 World Cup. Nazi politicians ordered five or six ex-Austrian players, from the clubs Rapid Vienna, Austria Vienna, and First Vienna FC, to join the "all-German" team on short notice in a staged show of unity for political reasons. At the 1938 World Cup in France, this "united" Germany national team managed only a 1–1 draw against Switzerland and then lost the replay 2–4 in front of a hostile crowd in Paris. That early exit stands as Germany's worst World Cup result before 2018, and one of just three occasions the team failed to progress from the group stage – the next would not occur until the 2018 tournament, and it would be repeated in 2022.

During World War II, the team played over 30 international games between September 1939 and November 1942. National team games were then suspended, as most players had to join the armed forces. Many of the national team players were gathered together under coach Herberger as Rote Jäger through the efforts of a sympathetic air force officer trying to protect the footballers from the most dangerous wartime service.

=== Three German national teams (1945–1990) ===
After World War II, Germany was banned from competition in most sports until 1950. The DFB was not a full member of FIFA, and none of the three new German states – West Germany, East Germany, and Saarland – entered the 1950 World Cup qualifiers.

The Federal Republic of Germany, which was referred to as West Germany, continued the DFB. With recognition by FIFA and UEFA, the DFB maintained and continued the record of the pre-war team. Switzerland was the first team that played West Germany in 1950, with the latter qualifying for the 1954 World Cup and the former hosting it.

The Saarland, a French protectorate between 1947 and 1956, did not join French organisations, and was barred from participating in pan-German ones. It sent their own team to the 1952 Summer Olympics and the 1954 World Cup qualifiers. In 1957, Saarland acceded to the Federal Republic of Germany.

In 1949, the communist German Democratic Republic (East Germany) was founded. In 1952 the Deutscher Fußball-Verband der DDR (DFV) was established and the East Germany national football team took to the field. They were the only team to beat the 1974 FIFA World Cup-winning West Germans in the only meeting of the two sides of the divided nation. East Germany won the gold medal at the 1976 Olympics. After German reunification in 1990, the eastern football competition was reintegrated into the DFB.

=== 1954 World Cup victory ===
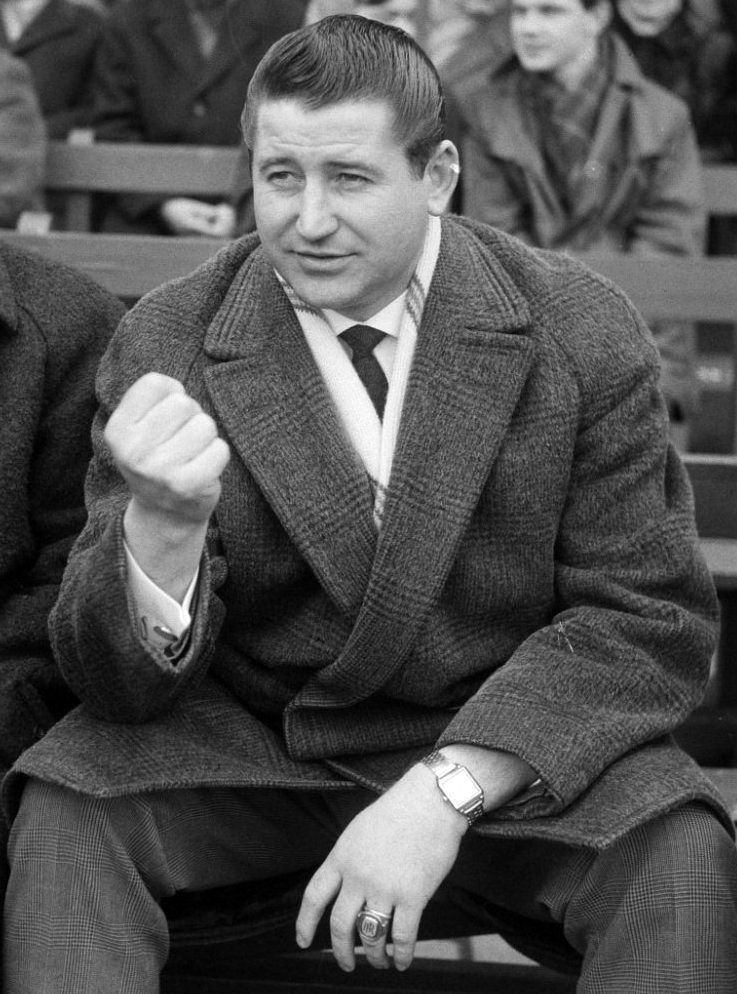
Helmut Rahn scored the winning goal in the 1954 FIFA World Cup final.

West Germany, captained by Fritz Walter, met in the 1954 World Cup against Turkey, Yugoslavia and Austria. When playing favourites Hungary in the group stage, West Germany lost 3–8, and faced the Hungarian "Mighty Magyars" again in the final. Hungary had gone unbeaten for 32 consecutive matches, and West Germany snapped the streak by winning 3–2, with Helmut Rahn scoring the winning goal. The success is called "The Miracle of Bern" (Das Wunder von Bern).

=== Memorable losses: Wembley goal and game of the century (1958–1970) ===
After finishing fourth in the 1958 World Cup and only reaching the quarter-finals four years later, the DFB made changes. Professionalism was introduced, and the best clubs from the various Regionalligas were assembled into the new Bundesliga. In 1964, Helmut Schön took over as coach, replacing Herberger who had been in office for 28 years.

In the 1966 World Cup, West Germany reached the final after beating the USSR in the semi-final, facing hosts England. In extra time, the first goal by Geoff Hurst was one of the most contentious goals in the history of the World Cup: the linesman signalled the ball had crossed the line for a goal, after bouncing down from the crossbar, when replays showed it did not appear to have fully crossed the line. Hurst then scored another goal giving England a 4–2 win.

West Germany knocked England out in the 1970 World Cup quarter-finals 3–2, before they suffered a 4–3 extra-time loss in the semi-final against Italy. This match with five goals in extra time is one of the most dramatic in World Cup history, and is called the "Game of the Century" in both Italy and Germany. West Germany claimed third place by beating Uruguay 1–0. Gerd Müller finished as the tournament's top scorer with 10 goals.

=== 1974 World Cup title on home soil ===
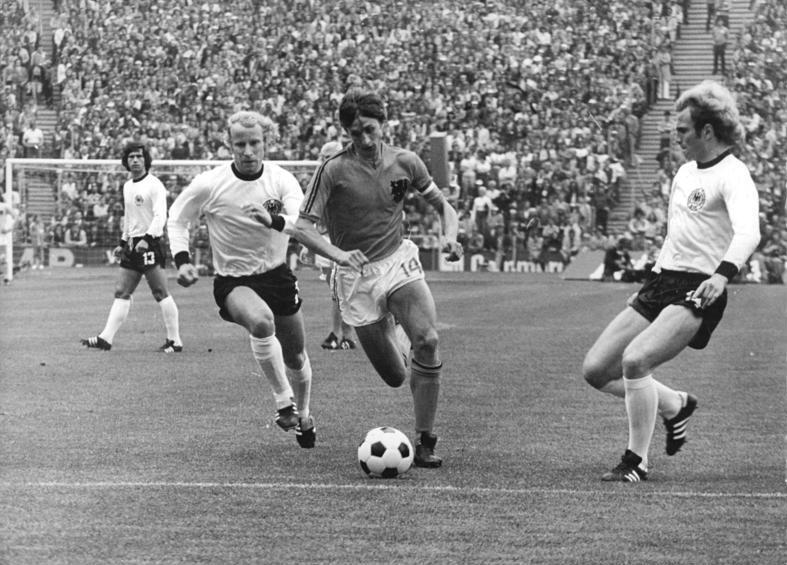
The 1974 FIFA World Cup Final on 7 July, in Munich's Olympiastadion

In 1971, Franz Beckenbauer became captain of the national team, and he led West Germany to victory at the European Championship at Euro 1972, defeating the Soviet Union 3–0 in the final.

As hosts of the 1974 World Cup, they won their second World Cup, defeating the Netherlands 2–1 in the final in Munich. Two matches in the 1974 World Cup stood out for West Germany. The first group stage saw a politically charged match as West Germany played a game against East Germany. The East Germans won 1–0 but it made a scant difference to West Germany as the West Germans advanced to the knockout stage. The West Germans advanced to the final against the Johan Cruyff-led Dutch team and their brand of "Total Football". The Dutch took the lead from a penalty. However, West Germany equalised with a penalty by Paul Breitner, and won the match with Gerd Müller's fine finish soon after.

=== Late 1970s and early 1980s ===
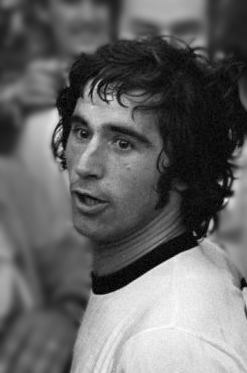
Gerd Müller in 1974

West Germany failed to defend their titles in the next two major international tournaments. They lost to Czechoslovakia in the UEFA Euro 1976 final in a penalty shootout 5–3, their last penalty shootout loss in a major tournament as of 2025.

In the 1978 World Cup, Germany was eliminated in the second group stage after losing 3–2 to Austria. Schön retired as coach afterward, and the post was taken over by his assistant, Jupp Derwall.

West Germany's first tournament under Derwall was successful, as they earned their second European title at Euro 1980 after defeating Belgium 2–1 in the final. West Germany started the 1982 World Cup with a 1–2 upset by newcomers Algeria in their first match, but advanced to the second round with a controversial 1–0 win over Austria. In the semi-final against France, they drew 3–3 and won the penalty shootout 5–4. In the final, they were defeated by Italy 1–3.

During this period, West Germany's Gerd Müller racked up fourteen goals in two World Cups (1970 and 1974). His ten goals in 1970 are the third-most ever in a tournament. Müller's all-time World Cup record of 14 goals was broken by Ronaldo in 2006; this was then further broken by Miroslav Klose in 2014 with 16 goals.

=== 1990 World Cup title and Beckenbauer's managing era (1984–1990) ===
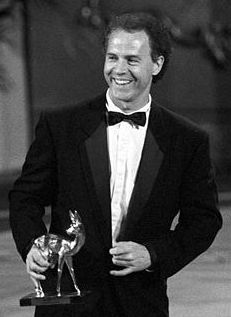
Franz Beckenbauer in 1990

After West Germany were eliminated in the first round of Euro 1984, Franz Beckenbauer returned to the national team to replace Derwall as manager. At the 1986 World Cup in Mexico, West Germany finished as runners-up for the second consecutive tournament after beating France 2–0 in the semi-finals, but losing to the Diego Maradona-led Argentina in the final, 2–3. In Euro 1988, after drawing Italy 1–1 and beating both Denmark and Spain 2–0 in the group stage, West Germany's hopes of winning the tournament on home soil were spoiled by the Netherlands, as the Dutch beat them 2–1 in the semi-finals.

At the 1990 World Cup in Italy, West Germany won their third World Cup title, in its unprecedented third consecutive final appearance. Captained by Lothar Matthäus, they defeated Yugoslavia (4–1), UAE (5–1), the Netherlands (2–1), Czechoslovakia (1–0), and England (1–1, 4–3 on penalty kicks) on the way to a final rematch against Argentina in Rome. West Germany won 1–0, with the only goal being a penalty scored in the 85th minute by Andreas Brehme. Beckenbauer, who won the World Cup as the national team's captain in 1974, thus became the first person to win the World Cup as both captain and manager, and the second to win as player and manager, after Mario Zagallo of Brazil.

=== Olympic football ===
Medal record

Summer Olympic Games
Gold medal – first place	1976 Montreal	Team
Silver medal – second place	1980 Moscow	Team
Bronze medal – third place	1964 Tokyo	Team
Bronze medal – third place	1972 Munich	Team
Bronze medal – third place	1988 Seoul	Team

East Germany did however achieve significantly greater success in Olympic football than the amateur teams fielded by the Western NOC of Germany due to using its elite players from the top domestic league. In 1956, 1960, and 1964 both states had sent a United Team of Germany. For 1964, the East German side had beaten their Western counterparts in order to be selected. They went on to win the bronze medal for Germany. As GDR, they won bronze in 1972 in Munich, gold in 1976 in Montreal, and silver in 1980 in Moscow.

Prior to 1984, Olympic football was an amateur event, meaning that only non-professional players could participate. (Note: Since 1992, Olympic football has been a tournament for the U23 national football teams) Due to this, West Germany was never able to achieve the same degree of success at the Olympics as at the World Cup. The first medal coming in the 1988 Olympics, when they won the bronze medal after beating Italy 3–0 in the 3rd place match. West Germany also reached the second round in both 1972 and 1984. On the other hand, due to having an ability to field its top-level players who were classified as amateurs on a technicality East Germany did better, winning a gold, a silver and two bronze medals (one representing the United Team of Germany).

=== Berti Vogts years (1990–1998) ===
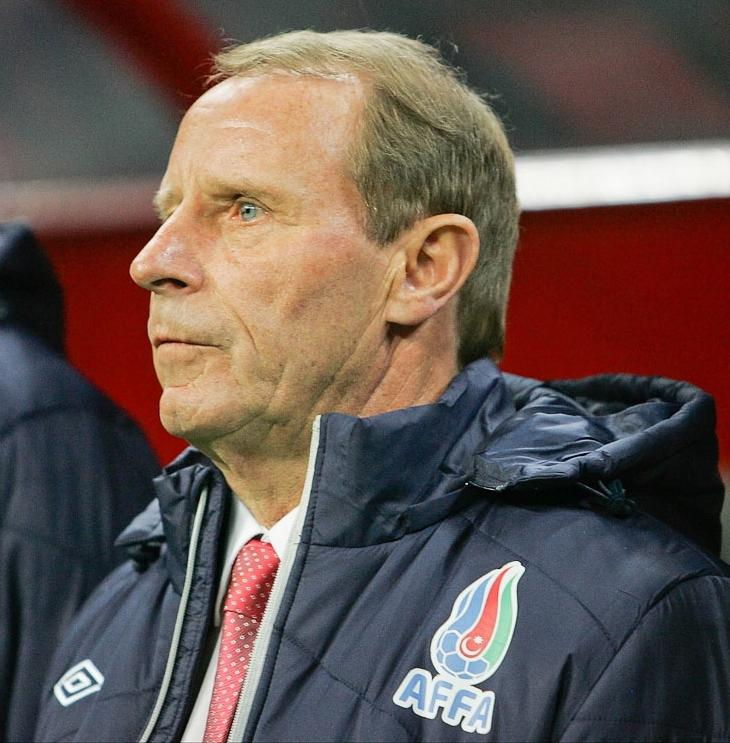
Berti Vogts

In February 1990, three months after the fall of the Berlin Wall, East Germany and West Germany were drawn together in UEFA Euro 1992 qualifying. In November 1990, the East German association Deutscher Fußball-Verband integrated into the DFB, by which time the East Germany team had ceased operations, playing its last match on 12 September 1990. The unified Germany national team completed the European Championship qualifying group. The East German 1990–91 league continued, with a restructuring of German leagues in 1991–92. The first game with a unified Germany national team was against Switzerland on 19 December 1990.

After the 1990 World Cup, assistant Berti Vogts took over as the national team coach from the retiring Beckenbauer. In Euro 1992, Germany reached the final, but lost 0–2 to underdogs Denmark.

In the 1994 World Cup, they were upset 1–2 in the quarterfinals by Bulgaria. As Germany played its first World Cup as a reunified nation, only one former East German player, Matthias Sammer, was included on the roster. Sammer played a significant role, featuring in four out of Germany's five matches. The tournament marked a significant shift in East German representation at the World Cup, with few East German-born players being rostered for subsequent tournaments. Some researchers tie this to the excess of restrictions regarding football in the German Democratic Republic. The East German national team only featured in one World Cup, famously beating hosts West Germany 1-0 during the group stage in 1974. The unification of the West and East German football leagues had also led to a decline in East German Clubs, as they could no longer rely on government funding to subsidize their expenditures. In the 1994/95 Bundesliga season, Dynamo Dresden was the only East German club in the league, and was relegated at the end of the season.

Reunified Germany won its first major international title at Euro 1996, becoming European champions for the third time. They defeated hosts England in the semi-finals, and the Czech Republic 2–1 in the final on a golden goal in extra time.

However, in the 1998 World Cup, Germany were eliminated in the quarter-finals after a 0–3 defeat to Croatia, with all goals being scored after defender Christian Wörns received a straight red card. Vogts stepped down afterwards and was replaced by Erich Ribbeck.

=== Erich Ribbeck and Rudi Völler years (2000–2004) ===
In Euro 2000, the team went out in the first round, drawing with Romania, then suffering a 1–0 defeat to England and were routed 3–0 by Portugal (which fielded their backup players, having already advanced). Ribbeck resigned, and was replaced by Rudi Völler.

Coming into the 2002 World Cup, expectations of Germany were low due to poor results in the qualifiers, and not directly qualifying for the finals for the first time. The team advanced from the group, and in the knockout stages they produced three consecutive 1–0 wins against Paraguay, the United States, and co-hosts South Korea. Oliver Neuville scored two minutes from time against Paraguay and Michael Ballack scored both goals in the US and South Korea games, although he picked up a second yellow card against South Korea for a tactical foul and was suspended for the subsequent match. This set up a final against Brazil, the first World Cup meeting between the two. Germany lost 0–2 thanks to two Ronaldo goals. Nevertheless, German captain and goalkeeper Oliver Kahn won the Golden Ball, the first time in the World Cup that a goalkeeper was named the best player of the tournament.

Germany once again exited in the first round at Euro 2004, drawing their first two matches and losing the third to the Czech Republic (who had fielded a second-string team). Völler resigned afterwards, and Jürgen Klinsmann was appointed head coach.

=== Resurgence under Klinsmann (2004–2006) ===
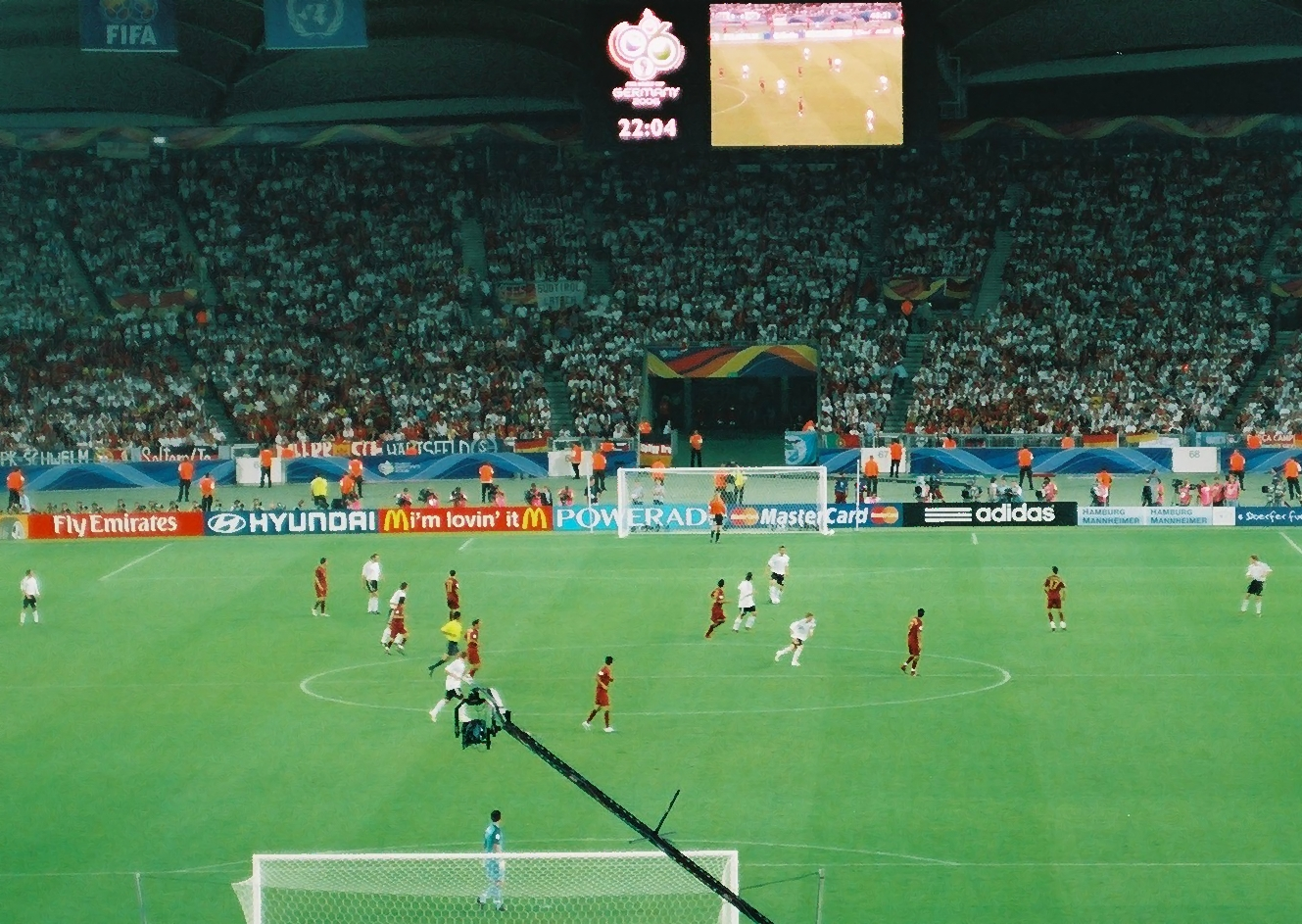
Germany vs Portugal in the third place match at the 2006 FIFA World Cup

Klinsmann's main task was to lead the national team to a good showing at the 2006 World Cup in Germany. He relieved goalkeeper Kahn of the captaincy and announced that Kahn and longtime backup Jens Lehmann would be competing for the position of starting goaltender, a decision that angered Kahn and Lehmann eventually won that contest. Expectations for the team were low, which was not helped by veteran defender Christian Wörns being dropped (after Wörns criticised Klinsmann for designating him only as a backup player on the squad), a choice roundly panned in Germany. Italy routed Germany 4–1 in a March 2006 exhibition game, and Klinsmann bore the brunt of the criticism as the team was ranked only 22nd in the world entering the 2006 World Cup.

As World Cup hosts, Germany won all three group stage matches to finish top of their group. The team defeated Sweden 2–0 in the round of 16, and Argentina in the quarter-finals in a penalty shootout. The semi-final against Italy was scoreless until near the end of extra time when Germany conceded two goals. In the third place match, Germany defeated Portugal 3–1. Miroslav Klose was awarded the Golden Boot for his tournament-leading five goals.

=== Löw era (2006–2021) ===
==== Euro 2008, 2010 World Cup and Euro 2012 ====
Germany's entry into the Euro 2008 qualifying round was marked by the promotion of Joachim Löw following the resignation of Klinsmann. At UEFA Euro 2008, Germany won two out of three matches in group play to advance to the knockout round. They defeated Portugal 3–2 in the quarter-final, and won their semi-final against Turkey. Germany lost the final against Spain 1–0, finishing as runners-up.

At the 2010 World Cup, Germany won the group and advanced to the knockout stage. In the round of 16, Germany defeated England 4–1. Miroslav Klose tied Gerd Müller's record of 14 World Cup goals, as Germany defeated Argentina 4–0 in the quarterfinals. In the semi-finals, Germany lost 1–0 to Spain. They defeated Uruguay 3–2 to finish third. Thomas Müller won the Golden Boot and the Best Young Player Award.

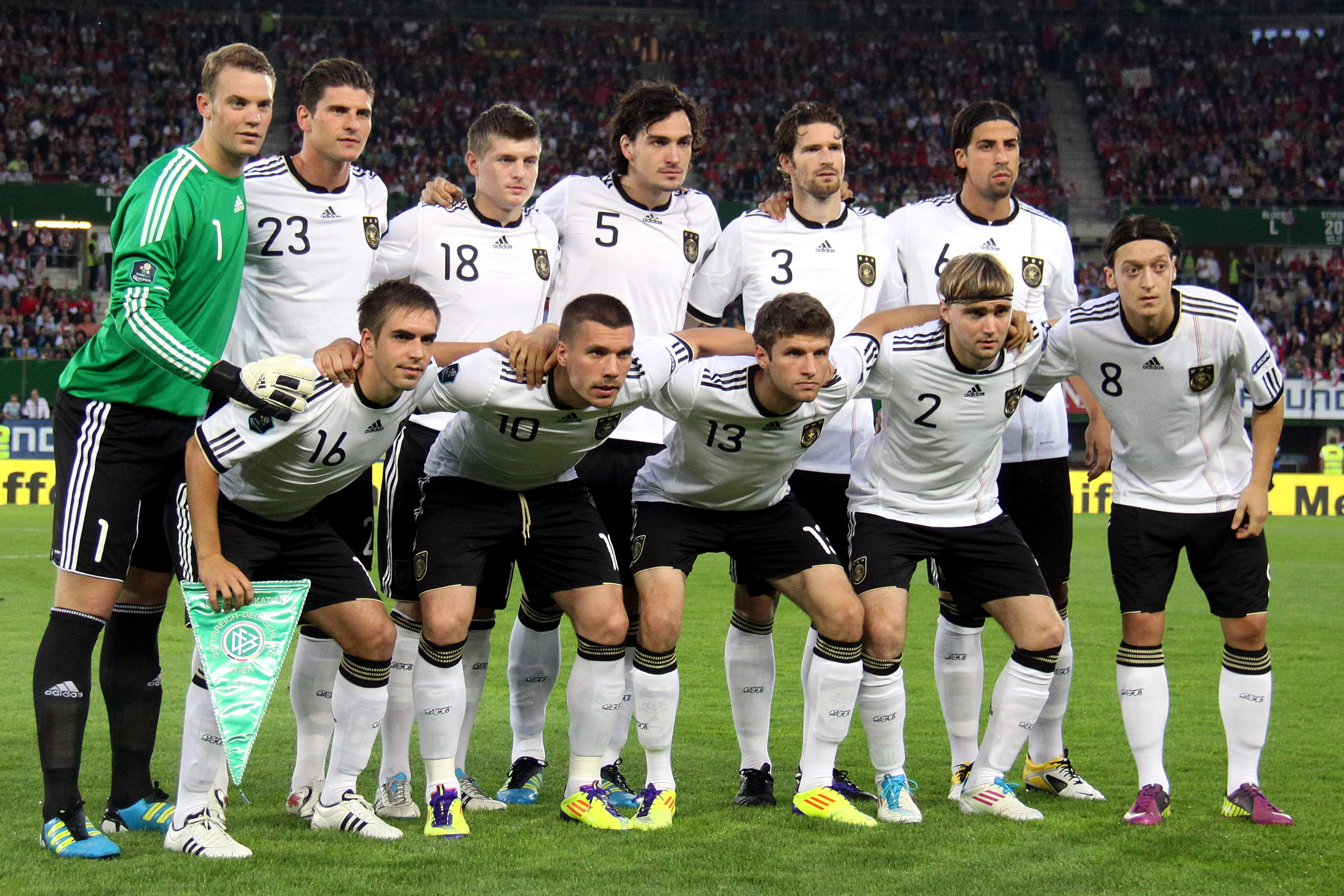
Germany during Euro 2012 qualifiers

At Euro 2012, Germany was placed in Group B along with Portugal, Netherlands, and Denmark. Germany won all three group matches, and then defeated Greece in the quarter-finals as they set a record of 15 consecutive wins in all competitive matches. In the semi-finals, Germany lost to Italy, 2–1.

==== 2014 World Cup victory ====
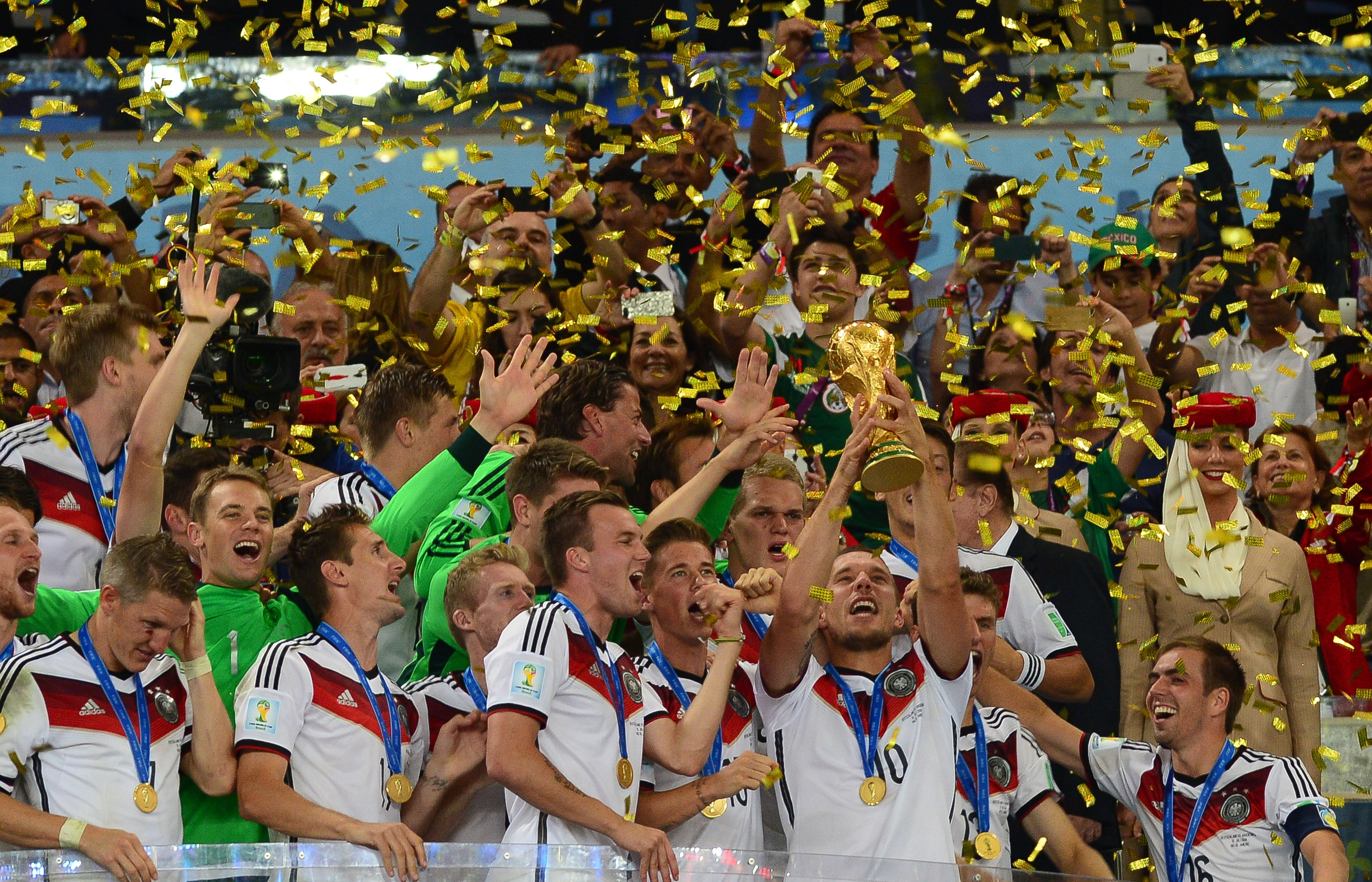
Germany lifting the World Cup trophy in 2014

Germany were placed in Group G of the 2014 World Cup, with Portugal, Ghana, and the United States. They first faced Portugal in a match billed by some as the "team of all the talents against the team of The Talent (Cristiano Ronaldo)", routing the Portuguese 4–0 thanks to a hat-trick by Thomas Müller. In their match with Ghana, they led the game before Ghana fought back to take the lead. When Klose scored to level the match at 2–2, he netted his 15th World Cup goal to join former Brazil striker Ronaldo at the pinnacle of World Cup Finals scorers. They then went on to defeat the Klinsmann-led United States 1–0, securing them a spot in the knockout stages.

The round of 16 knockout match against Algeria remained goalless after regulation time, resulting in an extra time period where André Schürrle scored from a Thomas Müller pass after only less than two minutes. Mesut Özil scored Germany's second goal in the 120th minute with the match ending 2–1. In the quarter-finals against France, Mats Hummels scored the only goal in the 13th minute, as Germany advanced to a record fourth consecutive semi-final.

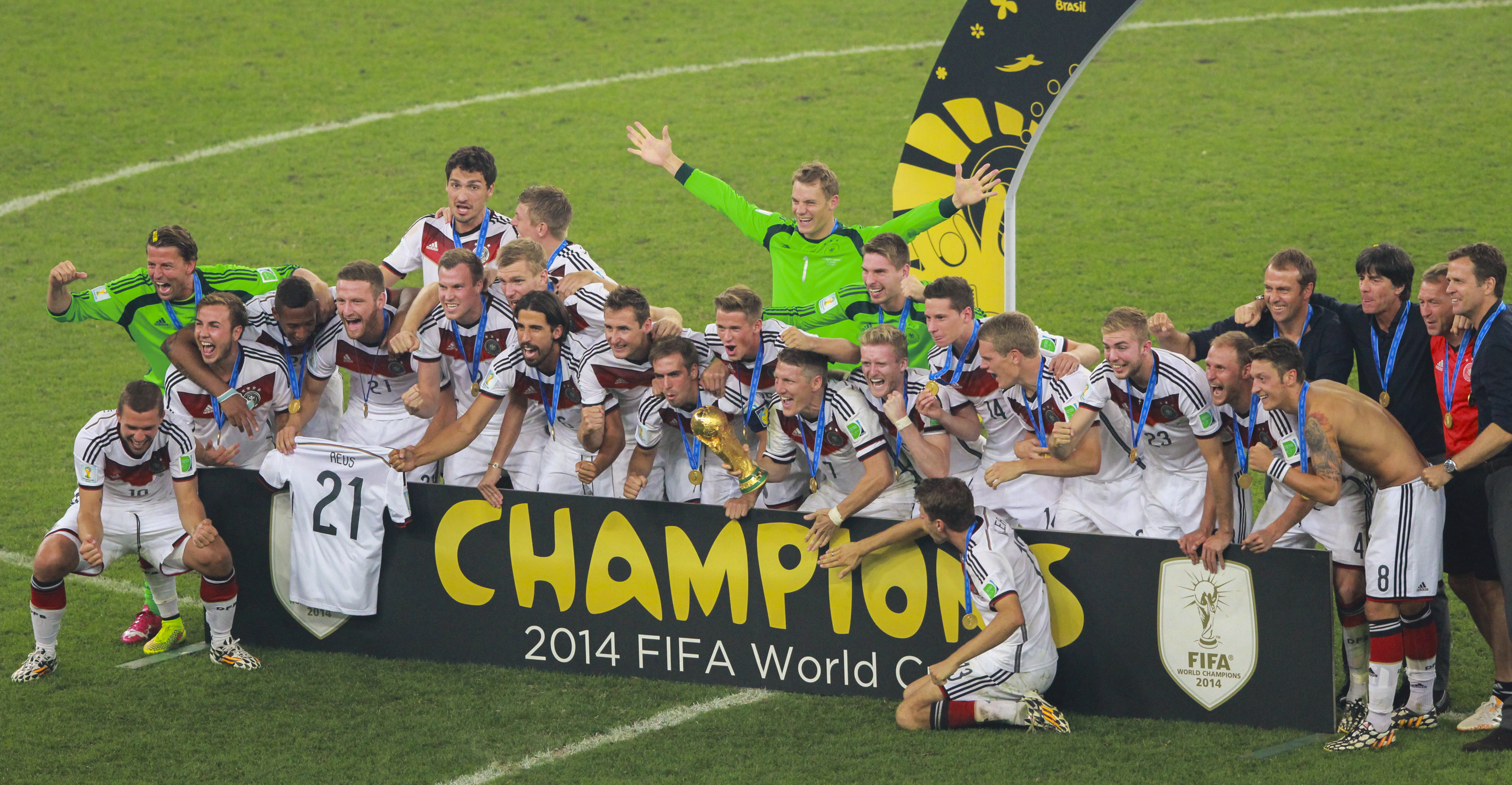
Germany posing with a "Champions" banner after the 2014 World Cup final

The 7–1 semi-final win against Brazil was one of the most memorable games in World Cup history; Germany scored four goals in just less than seven minutes and were 5–0 up by the 30th minute with goals from Thomas Müller, Miroslav Klose, Sami Khedira and two from Toni Kroos. Germany's 7–0 lead in the second half was the highest score against Brazil in a single game. It was Brazil's worst ever World Cup defeat, whilst Germany broke multiple World Cup records with the win, including the record broken by Klose, the first team to reach four consecutive World Cup semi-finals, the first team to score seven goals in a World Cup knockout phase game, the fastest five consecutive goals in World Cup history (with four of the goals scored in just 400 seconds), and the first team to score five goals in the first half in a World Cup semi-final.

The World Cup final was held at the Maracanã in Rio de Janeiro on 13 July. Mario Götze's 113th-minute goal helped Germany beat Argentina 1–0, becoming the first-ever European team to win a FIFA World Cup in the Americas and the second European team to win the title outside Europe.

==== Euro 2016 to 2017 Confederations Cup ====
After several players retired from the team following the 2014 World Cup, including Philipp Lahm, Per Mertesacker and Miroslav Klose, the team had a disappointing start in the UEFA Euro 2016 qualifiers. They defeated Scotland 2–1 at home, then suffered a 2–0 loss at Poland (the first in their history), a 1–1 draw against the Republic of Ireland, and a 4–0 win over Gibraltar. Troubles during qualifying for Euro 2016 continued, drawing at home, as well as losing away to Ireland; the team also only narrowly defeated Scotland on two occasions, but handily won the return against Poland and both games against Gibraltar (who competed for the first time). They would eventually win their group and qualify for the tournament.

On 13 November 2015, Germany played a friendly against France in Paris when a series of terrorist attacks took place in the city, some in the direct vicinity of the Stade de France, where the game was held. For security reasons, the team spent the night inside the stadium, accompanied by the French squad who stayed behind in an act of comradery. Four days later, Germany was scheduled to face the Netherlands at Hanover's HDI-Arena, in another friendly. After initial security reservations, the DFB decided to play the match on 15 November. After reports about a concrete threat to the stadium, the match was cancelled 90 minutes before kickoff.

At UEFA Euro 2016, Germany began their campaign with a 2–0 win against Ukraine. Against Poland, Germany were held to a 0–0 draw but concluded Group C play with a 1–0 win against Northern Ireland. In the round of 16, Germany faced Slovakia and earned a comfortable 3–0 win. Germany then faced off against rivals Italy in the quarter-finals. Mesut Özil opened the scoring in the 65th minute for Germany, before Leonardo Bonucci equalised after netting a penalty thirteen minutes later. The score remained 1–1 after extra time, and Germany beat Italy 6–5 in a penalty shootout. It was the first time Germany had overcome Italy in a major tournament. The Germans lost to hosts France 2–0 in the semi-finals, their first competitive win against Germany in 58 years.

Germany qualified for the 2017 FIFA Confederations Cup after winning the 2014 World Cup, and won the last version of the Confederations Cup after a 1–0 win against Chile in the final at the Krestovsky Stadium in Saint Petersburg, Russia.

==== Disappointment at the 2018 World Cup, 2018–19 UEFA Nations League and Euro 2020 ====
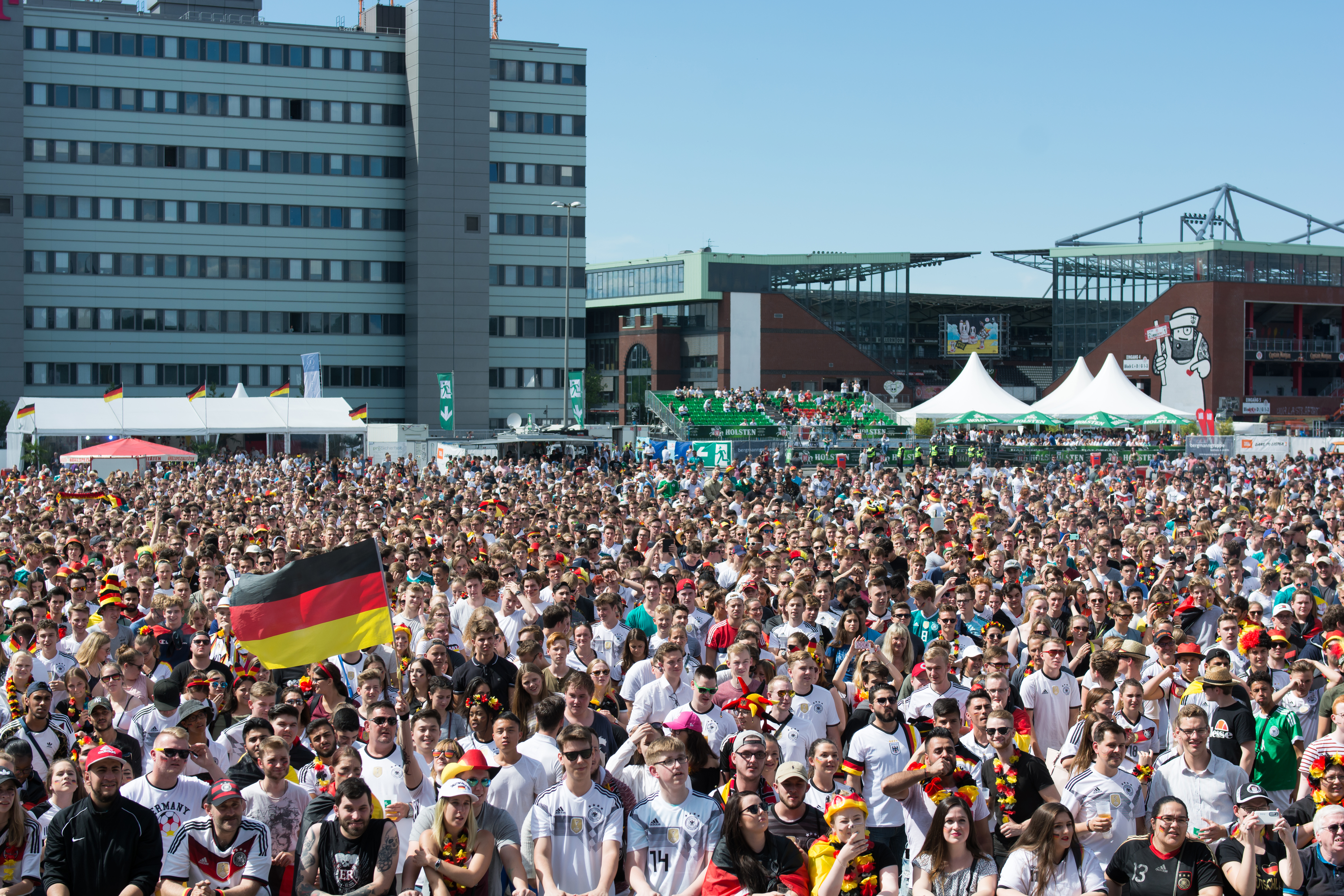
Fans in Hamburg watching the match between Germany and South Korea

After winning all their qualifying matches and the Confederations Cup the previous year, Germany started their 2018 World Cup campaign with a defeat to Mexico, their first loss in an opening match since the 1982 World Cup. Germany defeated Sweden 2–1 in their second game via an injury-time winner from Toni Kroos, but were subsequently eliminated following a 2–0 loss to South Korea, their first exit in the first round since 1938 and first in the group stage since the format had been reintroduced in 1950. With this result Germany became the fifth defending champions to be eliminated in the group stages of the World Cup, following Brazil in 1966, France in 2002, Italy in 2010, and Spain in 2014.

Following the World Cup, Germany's struggles continued into the inaugural UEFA Nations League. After a 0–0 draw at home against France, they lost 3–0 against the Netherlands and 2–1 in the rematch against France three days later; the latter result being their fourth loss in six competitive matches. Due to results elsewhere, the relegation to League B was originally confirmed, but due to the overhaul of the format for the 2020–21 UEFA Nations League, Germany were spared from relegation to League B.

In March 2021, the DFB announced that Löw would step down as Germany's manager after UEFA Euro 2020. Later that month, Germany lost 2–1 at home to North Macedonia in the 2022 World Cup qualifiers, their first World Cup qualification defeat since losing 5–1 to England in September 2001 and only their third in history. On 25 May 2021, the DFB announced that former assistant manager Hansi Flick would replace Löw as head coach.

At Euro 2020 (delayed until 2021 due to the COVID-19 pandemic), Germany were drawn with World Cup champions France (to whom they lost 1–0) and reigning European champions Portugal (whom they defeated 4–2), with each group having only two guaranteed qualifiers for the next phase, plus a chance for the third-placed team. In the final group match, the Hungarians took the lead twice only to draw. Germany then lost 2–0 to England in the round of 16, their first round of 16 exit in a major tournament since the 1938 World Cup.

=== Recent years (2021–present) ===
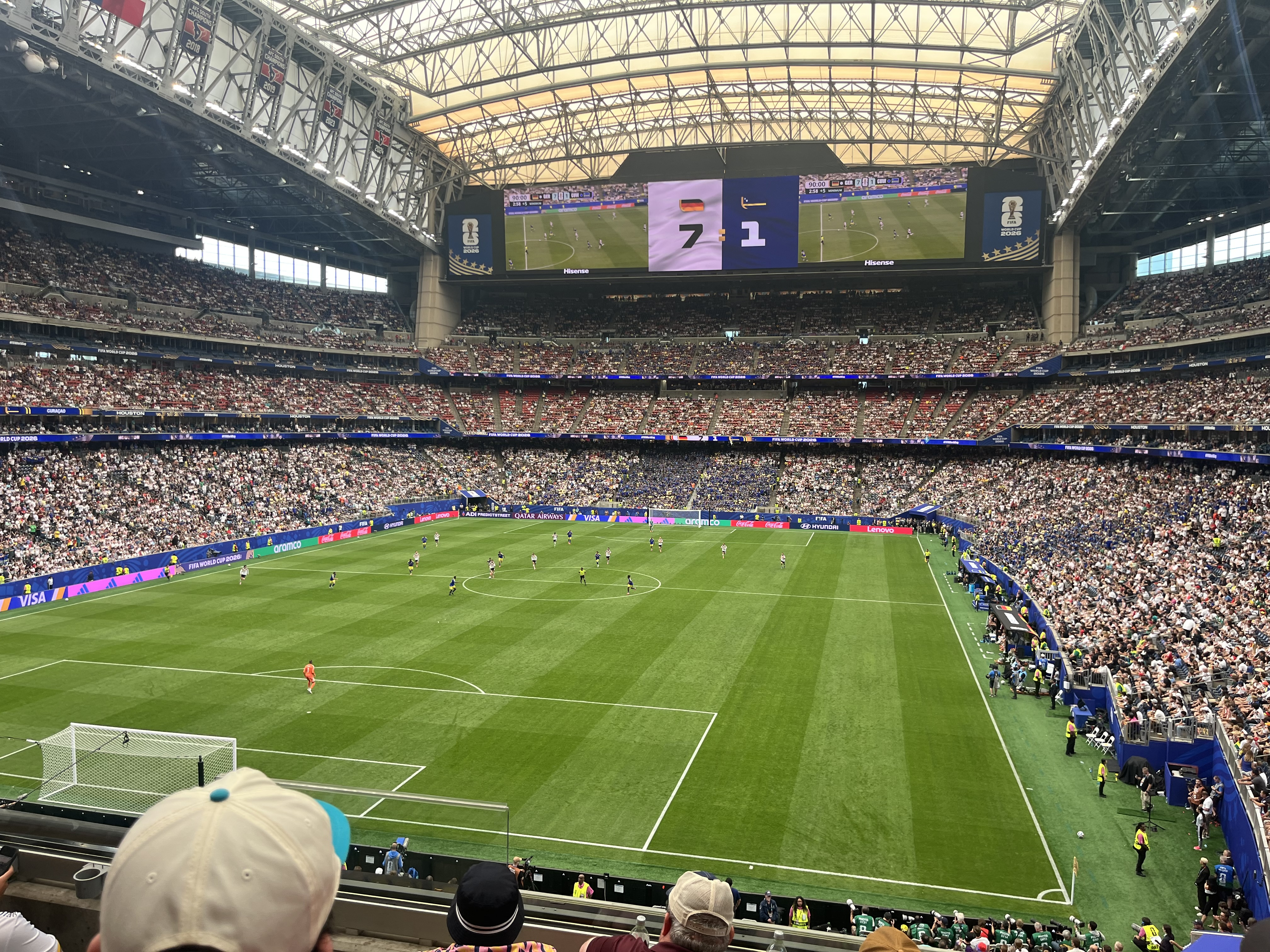
Germany vs Curaçao at the 2026 FIFA World Cup

Following Germany's disappointment at Euro 2020, Hansi Flick, former Bayern Munich manager, took over as coach of the national team. On 11 October 2021, Germany beat North Macedonia 4–0 to become the first team (outside of the hosts) to qualify for the 2022 World Cup in Qatar. In the 2022–23 Nations League, Germany recorded their first-ever competitive win against Italy as the Germans beat the visitors 5–2. This was Germany's fourth game and first win in the league, however the Germans finished third in the group.

At the 2022 World Cup, Germany were drawn into Group E with Spain, Japan and Costa Rica. The campaign started with a shock 2–1 defeat to Japan. Germany drew 1–1 with Spain, and then were knocked out of the World Cup in the group stage for the second consecutive tournament, despite a 4–2 win over Costa Rica, missing out on a place in the knockout stages on goal difference.

After several poor performances following Germany's World Cup exit – including a 4–1 home loss to Japan – Flick was dismissed on 10 September 2023. On 22 September 2023, Julian Nagelsmann was named the new head coach. After a rocky end to 2023, only winning one out of four games, Germany found itself back in form in the new year with a second victory against France and the Netherlands, strengthening hopes for a successful UEFA Euro 2024 campaign.

As hosts of Euro 2024, Germany won the tournament's opening match against Scotland 5–1. Germany went on to defeat Hungary 2–0 in their second match to qualify for the round of 16. After defeating Denmark in the round of 16, Germany went on to the quarter-finals, where they were defeated 2–1 after extra time by Spain.

Germany finished the group stage of the 2024-25 UEFA Nations League, further consisting of the Netherlands, Hungary and Bosnia and Herzegovina, undefeated, sealing their participation in the knockout stage with a 7–0 home win against Bosnia and Herzegovina. Defeating Italy on aggregate in the quarter-finals, Germany qualified for the 2025 UEFA Nations League Finals, where they lost 1–2 against Portugal and 0–2 against France, finishing in fourth place.

Having been drawn into Group A of the 2026 FIFA World Cup qualification along with Slovakia, Northern Ireland and Luxembourg, Germany lost the opener 0–2 against Slovakia before embarking on an 11-game winning streak, giving Northern Ireland their first home loss in three years and sealing qualification with a 6–0 win during the rematch with Slovakia.

At the 2026 World Cup, Germany were drawn into Group E with Curaçao, Ecuador, and Ivory Coast. Germany beat Curaçao 7–1 and Ivory Coast 2–1 in the group stage, qualifying for the knockout stage for the first time since 2014. The team faced Paraguay in the round of 32, and after the match ended with a 1–1 draw, Germany were defeated 3–4 via penalty shoot-out, marking their first ever World Cup penalty shoot-out loss. The elimination was regarded as one of the biggest World Cup knockout-stage upsets in terms of FIFA ranking difference, with a 31-place gap as Paraguay were ranked 41st and Germany were ranked 10th. Head coach Julian Nagelsmann stepped down shortly afterwards.

== Team image ==
=== Kits and crest ===
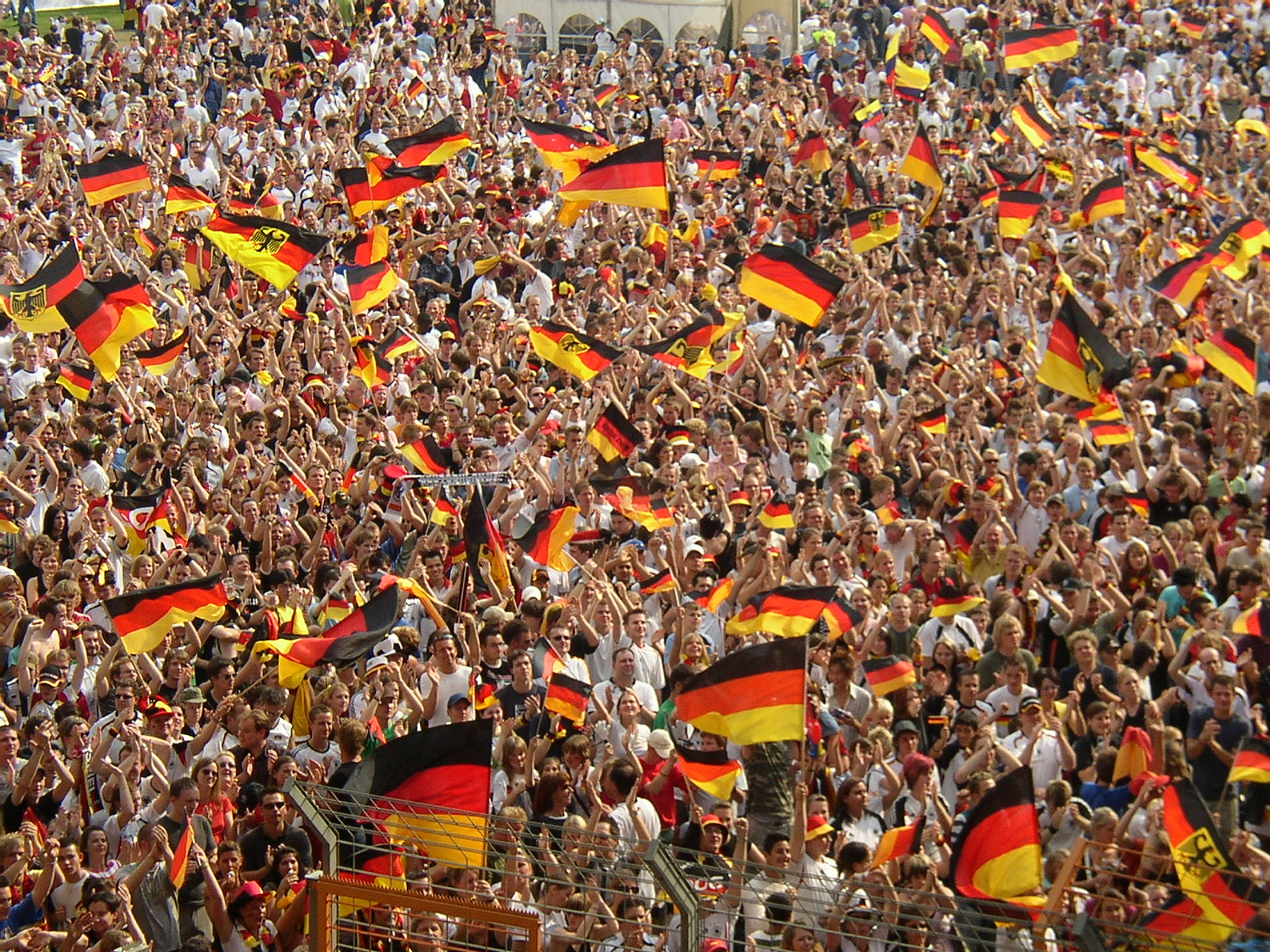
The 2006 World Cup saw a widespread public display of the German national flag.

The national team's home kit has been traditionally a white shirt, black shorts, and white socks. The colours are derived from the 19th-century flag of the North German State of Prussia. Since 1988, many of the home kit's designs incorporate details patterned after the modern German flag. For the 2014 World Cup, Germany's kit was white shorts rather than the traditional black due to FIFA's kit clashing rule for the tournament. The away shirt colour has changed several times. Historically, a green shirt with white shorts is the most often used alternative colour combination, derived from the DFB colours – though it is often erroneously reported that the choice is in recognition of the fact that Ireland, whose home shirts are green, were the first nation to play Germany in a friendly game after World War II. However, the first team to play Germany after WWII, as stated above, was actually Switzerland. Other colours such as red, grey and black have also been used.

A change from black to red came in 2005 on the request of Jürgen Klinsmann, but Germany played every game at the 2006 World Cup in its home white colours. In 2010, the away colours then changed back to a black shirt and white shorts, but at the World Cup, the team dressed up in the black shorts from the home kit. The kit used by Germany returned to a green shirt on its away kit, but then changed again to red-and-black striped shirts with white stripes and letters and black shorts.

Adidas AG is the longstanding kit provider to the national team, a sponsorship that began in 1954 and is contracted to continue through 2026. In the 70s, Germany wore Erima kits (a German brand, formerly a subsidiary of Adidas). In March 2024, Nike was announced as the new kit sponsor after 70 years of Adidas, causing widespread criticism and backlash.

As a common practice, three stars were added above the crest in 1996, symbolising Germany's World Cup titles in 1954, 1974, and 1990. In 2014, a fourth star was added after Germany were crowned world champions for the fourth time.

==== Kit suppliers ====
Kit supplier	Period	Notes
Leuzela	1950–1964	Germany wore Leuzela kits during the 1954 FIFA World Cup.
Umbro	1964–1971	Germany wore Umbro kits during the 1966 and 1970 FIFA World Cups.
Erima	1971–1980	Erima was a subsidiary of Adidas in the 1970s.
Adidas	1980–2026	First Adidas jersey was worn in the UEFA Euro 1980 final.
Nike	2027–2034	Nike will become the first non-German kit supplier for Germany since 1971.

==== Kit deals ====
Kit supplier	Period	Contract		Notes
Kit supplier	Period	Announcement	Duration	Notes
Adidas	1954–2026	20 June 2016	2019–2022 (4 years)	Per year: €50 million ($56.7 million); Total: €250 million ($283.5 million)
Adidas	1954–2026	10 September 2018	2023–2026 (4 years)	Undisclosed
Nike	2027–2034	21 March 2024	2027–2034 (8 years)	Per year: €100 million ($108 million)

=== Home stadium ===
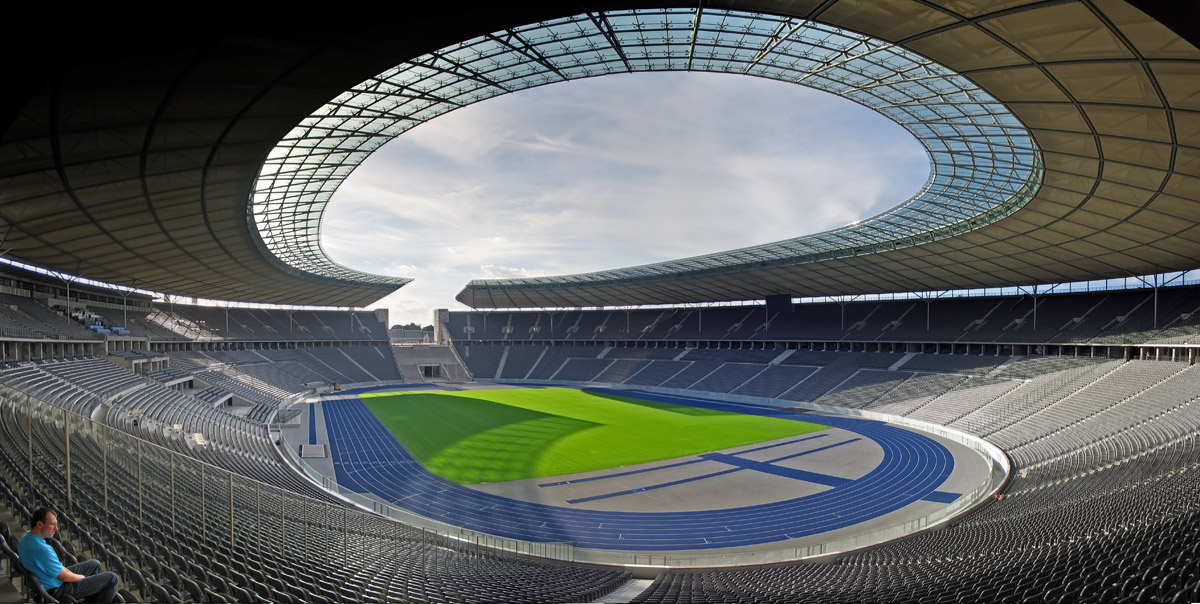
Olympic Stadium in Berlin

Germany plays its home matches among various stadiums, in rotation, around the country. They have played home matches in 43 different cities so far, including venues that were German at the time of the match, such as Vienna, Austria, which staged three games between 1938 and 1942.

National team matches have been held most often in Berlin (46 matches), which was the venue of Germany's first home match (in 1908 against England). Other common host cities include Hamburg (34 matches), Stuttgart (32), Hanover (28) and Dortmund. Munich also hosted noteworthy matches including the 1974 World Cup final.

=== Media coverage ===
As of January 2025, Germany's broadcasts for friendlies rotate between RTL, ARD and ZDF, while UEFA Euro and FIFA World Cup qualifying matches, UEFA Nations League games, and major tournaments are on ARD and ZDF.

== Results and fixtures ==
The following is a list of match results in the last twelve months, as well as any future matches that have been scheduled.

Win Draw Loss Fixture

=== 2026 ===
27 March 2026 Friendly	Switzerland	3–4	Germany	Basel
20:45 CET (UTC+01:00)	Ndoye 17'; Embolo 41'; Monteiro 79'	Report	Tah 26'; Gnabry 45+2'; Wirtz 61', 85'	Stadium: St. Jakob-Park; Attendance: 34,316; Referee: Chris Kavanagh (England)

30 March 2026 Friendly	Germany	2–1	Ghana	Stuttgart
20:45 CEST (UTC+02:00)	Havertz 45+3' (pen.); Undav 88'	Report	Fatawu 70'	Stadium: MHPArena; Attendance: 52,723; Referee: Stuart Attwell (England)

31 May 2026 Friendly	Germany	4–0	Finland	Mainz
20:45 CEST (UTC+02:00)	Undav 34', 57'; Wirtz 48'; Musiala 63'	Report		Stadium: Mewa Arena; Attendance: 25,122; Referee: Matheus Candançan (Brazil)

6 June 2026 Friendly	United States	1–2	Germany	Chicago
13:30 CST (UTC−05:00)	Robinson 37'	Report	Havertz 2'; Sané 57'	Stadium: Soldier Field; Attendance: 63,636; Referee: Piero Maza (Chile)

14 June 2026 2026 FIFA World Cup Group E	Germany	7–1	Curaçao	Houston, United States
12:00 EST (UTC−05:00)	Nmecha 6'; Schlotterbeck 38'; Havertz 45+5' (pen.), 88'; Musiala 47'; Brown 68'; Undav 78'	Report	Comenencia 21'	Stadium: NRG Stadium; Attendance: 68,021; Referee: Jalal Jayed (Morocco)

20 June 2026 2026 FIFA World Cup Group E	Germany	2–1	Ivory Coast	Toronto, Canada
16:00 EST (UTC−04:00)	Undav 68', 90+4'	Report	Kessie 30'	Stadium: BMO Field; Attendance: 43,036; Referee: Juan Gabriel Benítez (Paraguay)

25 June 2026 2026 FIFA World Cup Group E	Ecuador	2–1	Germany	East Rutherford, United States
16:00 EST (UTC−04:00)	Angulo 9'; Plata 77'	Report	Sané 2'	Stadium: MetLife Stadium; Attendance: 80,663; Referee: Tori Penso (United States)

29 June 2026 2026 FIFA World Cup Round of 32	Germany	1–1 (a.e.t.) (3–4 p)	Paraguay	Foxborough, United States
16:30 EST (UTC−04:00)	Havertz 54'	Report	Enciso 42'	Stadium: Gillette Stadium; Attendance: 63,945; Referee: Jalal Jayed (Morocco)
	Penalties
	Havertz (penalty missed); Kimmich (penalty scored); Musiala (penalty scored); Woltemade (penalty missed); Amiri (penalty scored); Tah (penalty missed)		(penalty scored) Maurício; (penalty scored) G. Gómez; (penalty scored) Galarza; (penalty missed) Sanabria; (penalty missed) Balbuena; (penalty scored) Canale

24 September 2026 2026–27 UEFA Nations League	Netherlands	1–1	Germany	Amsterdam
20:45 CEST (UTC+02:00)	Gakpo 90+2'	Report	Nmecha 32'	Stadium: Johan Cruyff Arena; Attendance: 51,437; Referee: Alejandro Hernández Hernández (Spain)

27 September 2026 2026–27 UEFA Nations League	Germany	0–1	Greece	Augsburg
20:45 CEST (UTC+02:00)		Report	Kourbelis 74'	Stadium: Augsburg Arena; Attendance: 28,945; Referee: Chris Kavanagh (England)

1 October 2026 2026–27 UEFA Nations League	Germany	2–0	Serbia	Munich
20:45 CEST (UTC+02:00)	Bischof 39'; Wirtz 61'	Report		Stadium: Allianz Arena; Attendance: 68,121; Referee: Espen Eskås (Norway)

4 October 2026 2026–27 UEFA Nations League	Greece	0–0	Germany	Thessaloniki
21:45 EEST (UTC+03:00)		Report		Stadium: Toumba Stadium; Attendance: 27,599; Referee: Clément Turpin (France)

13 November 2026 2026–27 UEFA Nations League	Serbia	1–3	Germany	Belgrade
20:45 CET (UTC+01:00)	Babić 56'	Report	Babić 3' (o.g.); Wirtz 14'; Gruda 50'	Stadium: Rajko Mitić Stadium; Attendance: 2,962; Referee: Javier Alberola Rojas (Spain)

16 November 2026 2026–27 UEFA Nations League	Germany	5–0	Netherlands	Berlin
20:45 CET (UTC+01:00)	Scherhant 41'; Wirtz 60', 71'; Schlotterbeck 65'; Gruda 77'	Report		Stadium: Olympiastadion; Attendance: 71,765; Referee: Glenn Nyberg (Sweden)

=== 2027 ===
25 March 2027 2026–27 UEFA Nations League QF 1st Leg	Belgium	v	Germany
20:45 CET (UTC+01:00)		Report

28 March 2027 2026–27 UEFA Nations League QF 2nd Leg	Germany	v	Belgium
20:45 CEST (UTC+02:00)		Report

== Coaching staff ==
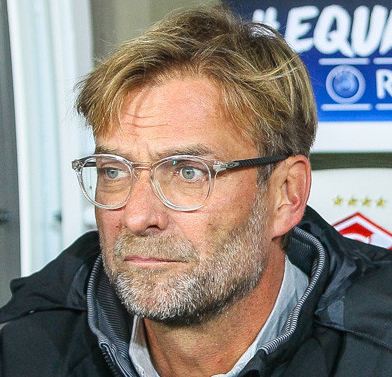
Current head coach Jürgen Klopp

As of 24 July 2026

Position	Name
Head coach	(Germany) Jürgen Klopp
Assistant coaches	(Germany) Peter Krawietz (Netherlands) Pepijn Lijnders (Germany) Sven Bender
Goalkeeping coaches	(Germany) Michael Fuchs (Switzerland) Andreas Kronenberg
Fitness coach	(Germany) Nicklas Dietrich
Athletic coach	(Croatia) Krunoslav Banovčić
Doctor	(Germany) Tim Meyer
Sporting director	(Germany) Rudi Völler

== Players ==
=== Current squad ===
The following players were called up for the 2026–27 UEFA Nations League matches against Serbia and the Netherlands on 13 and 16 November 2026, respectively.

Information correct as of 16 November 2026, after the match against the Netherlands.

No.	Pos.	Player	Date of birth (age)	Caps	Goals	Club
1	GK	Marc-André ter Stegen	30 April 1992 (age 34)	47	0	(Royal Dutch Football Association) Ajax
12	GK	Jonas Urbig	8 August 2003 (age 23)	2	0	(German Football Association) Bayern Munich
21	GK	Alexander Nübel	30 September 1996 (age 30)	4	0	(Turkish Football Federation) Beşiktaş
2	DF	Malick Thiaw	8 August 2001 (age 25)	10	1	(The Football Association) Newcastle United
3	DF	Ridle Baku	8 April 1998 (age 28)	9	2	(German Football Association) RB Leipzig
4	DF	Jonathan Tah	11 February 1996 (age 30)	55	1	(German Football Association) Bayern Munich
11	DF	Nathaniel Brown	16 June 2003 (age 23)	11	1	(German Football Association) Bayern Munich
13	DF	Philipp Treu	3 December 2000 (age 25)	5	0	(German Football Association) SC Freiburg
15	DF	Nico Schlotterbeck	1 December 1999 (age 26)	31	2	(German Football Association) Borussia Dortmund
16	DF	Finn Jeltsch	17 July 2006 (age 20)	1	0	(German Football Association) VfB Stuttgart
18	DF	Maximilian Mittelstädt	18 March 1997 (age 29)	18	1	(German Football Association) VfB Stuttgart
5	MF	Aleksandar Pavlović	3 May 2004 (age 22)	19	1	(German Football Association) Bayern Munich
6	MF	Joshua Kimmich (captain)	8 February 1995 (age 31)	118	10	(German Football Association) Bayern Munich
8	MF	Felix Nmecha	10 October 2000 (age 26)	15	3	(German Football Association) Borussia Dortmund
10	MF	Brajan Gruda	31 May 2004 (age 22)	2	2	(German Football Association) RB Leipzig
14	MF	Tom Bischof	28 June 2005 (age 21)	5	1	(German Football Association) Bayern Munich
17	MF	Florian Wirtz	3 May 2003 (age 23)	50	15	(The Football Association) Liverpool
19	MF	Derry Scherhant	10 November 2002 (age 24)	4	1	(German Football Association) SC Freiburg
20	MF	Said El Mala	26 August 2006 (age 20)	3	0	(German Football Association) 1. FC Köln
22	MF	Lennart Karl	22 February 2008 (age 18)	5	0	(German Football Association) Bayern Munich
	MF	Wael Mohya	31 December 2008 (age 17)	0	0	(German Football Association) Borussia Mönchengladbach
7	FW	Kai Havertz	11 June 1999 (age 27)	65	25	(The Football Association) Arsenal
9	FW	Niclas Füllkrug	9 February 1993 (age 33)	25	14	(German Football Association) Werder Bremen
23	FW	Younes Ebnoutalib	13 September 2003 (age 23)	3	0	(German Football Association) Eintracht Frankfurt

=== Recent call-ups ===
The following players have been called up to the national team in the past 12 months but are not part of the current squad.

Pos.	Player	Date of birth (age)	Caps	Goals	Club	Latest call-up
GK	Noah Atubolu	25 May 2002 (age 24)	0	0	(Germany) Eintracht Frankfurt	v. Greece, 4 October 2026
GK	Finn Dahmen	27 March 1998 (age 28)	0	0	(Germany) FC Augsburg	v. Greece, 4 October 2026
GK	Manuel Neuer ^{RET}	27 March 1986 (age 40)	128	0	(Germany) Bayern Munich	2026 FIFA World Cup
GK	Oliver Baumann	2 June 1990 (age 36)	13	0	(Germany) TSG Hoffenheim	2026 FIFA World Cup
DF	Waldemar Anton	20 July 1996 (age 30)	17	0	(Germany) Borussia Dortmund	v. Serbia, 13 November 2026
DF	David Raum	22 April 1998 (age 28)	40	1	(Germany) RB Leipzig	v. Greece, 4 October 2026
DF	Josha Vagnoman	11 December 2000 (age 25)	3	0	(Germany) VfB Stuttgart	v. Greece, 4 October 2026
DF	Yann Aurel Bisseck	29 November 2000 (age 25)	2	0	(Italy) Inter Milan	v. Greece, 4 October 2026
DF	Hennes Behrens	19 January 2005 (age 21)	1	0	(Germany) FC Augsburg	v. Greece, 4 October 2026
DF	Max Rosenfelder	10 February 2003 (age 23)	0	0	(Germany) SC Freiburg	v. Greece, 4 October 2026
DF	Antonio Rüdiger ^{RET}	3 March 1993 (age 33)	86	3	(Spain) Real Madrid	2026 FIFA World Cup
DF	Pascal Groß ^{RET}	15 June 1991 (age 35)	19	1	(England) Brighton & Hove Albion	2026 FIFA World Cup
MF	Nadiem Amiri	27 October 1996 (age 30)	14	1	(Germany) Mainz 05	v. Greece, 4 October 2026
MF	Karim Adeyemi	18 January 2002 (age 24)	13	1	(Spain) Barcelona	v. Greece, 4 October 2026
MF	Chris Führich	9 January 1998 (age 28)	10	0	(Germany) VfB Stuttgart	v. Greece, 4 October 2026
MF	Kevin Schade	27 November 2001 (age 24)	7	0	(England) Brentford	v. Greece, 4 October 2026
MF	Anton Stach	15 November 1998 (age 28)	5	0	(England) Leeds United	v. Greece, 4 October 2026
MF	Bambasé Conté	7 July 2003 (age 23)	3	0	(Germany) TSG Hoffenheim	v. Greece, 4 October 2026
MF	Mika Baur	9 July 2004 (age 22)	2	0	(Scotland) Celtic	v. Greece, 4 October 2026
MF	Yannik Engelhardt	7 February 2001 (age 25)	1	0	(Germany) SC Freiburg	v. Greece, 4 October 2026
MF	Vitaly Janelt	10 May 1998 (age 28)	1	0	(England) Brentford	v. Greece, 4 October 2026
MF	Felix Keidel	14 June 2003 (age 23)	0	0	(Germany) SV Elversberg	v. Greece, 4 October 2026
MF	Serge Gnabry	14 July 1995 (age 31)	62	26	(Germany) Bayern Munich	v. Serbia, 1 October 2026
MF	Jamal Musiala	26 February 2003 (age 23)	46	10	(Germany) Bayern Munich	v. Greece, 27 September 2026 ^{INJ}
MF	Leroy Sané	11 January 1996 (age 30)	80	18	(Turkey) Galatasaray	2026 FIFA World Cup
MF	Leon Goretzka	6 February 1995 (age 31)	73	15	(England) Aston Villa	2026 FIFA World Cup
MF	Angelo Stiller	4 April 2001 (age 25)	9	0	(Germany) VfB Stuttgart	2026 FIFA World Cup
MF	Jamie Leweling	26 February 2001 (age 25)	6	1	(Germany) VfB Stuttgart	2026 FIFA World Cup
MF	Assan Ouédraogo	9 May 2006 (age 20)	1	1	(Germany) RB Leipzig	2026 FIFA World Cup
FW	Nick Woltemade	14 February 2002 (age 24)	14	4	(Italy) Juventus	v. Greece, 4 October 2026
FW	Jonathan Burkardt	11 July 2000 (age 26)	8	0	(Germany) Eintracht Frankfurt	v. Greece, 4 October 2026
FW	Deniz Undav	19 July 1996 (age 30)	13	9	(Germany) VfB Stuttgart	2026 FIFA World Cup
FW	Maximilian Beier	17 October 2002 (age 24)	10	0	(Germany) Borussia Dortmund	2026 FIFA World Cup
^{INJ} Withdrew due to injury; ^{RET} Retired from the national team

== Individual records ==
=== Player records ===
As of 16 November 2026
Players in bold are still active with Germany.
This list does not include players who represented East Germany.

==== Most capped players ====
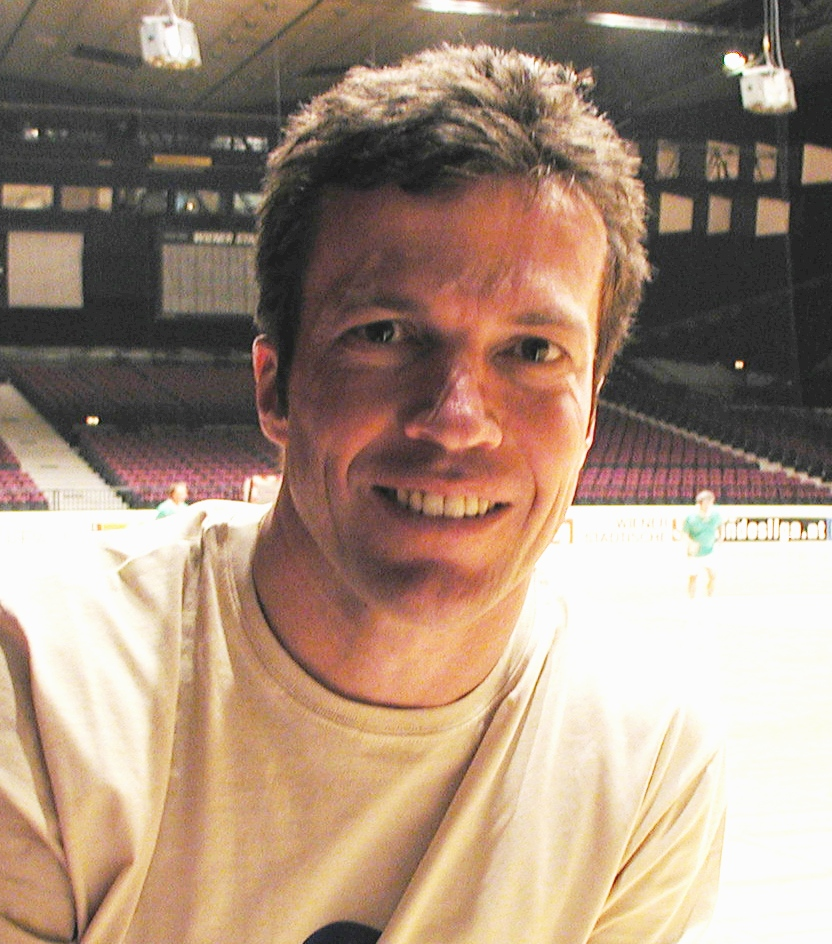
Lothar Matthäus is Germany's most capped player with 150 appearances.

Rank	Player	Caps	Goals	Period
1	Lothar Matthäus	150	23	1980–2000
2	Miroslav Klose	137	71	2001–2014
3	Thomas Müller	131	45	2010–2024
4	Lukas Podolski	130	49	2004–2017
5	Manuel Neuer	128	0	2009–2026
6	Bastian Schweinsteiger	121	24	2004–2016
7	**Joshua Kimmich**	118	10	2016–present
8	Toni Kroos	114	17	2010–2024
9	Philipp Lahm	113	5	2004–2014
10	Jürgen Klinsmann	108	47	1987–1998

==== Top goalscorers ====
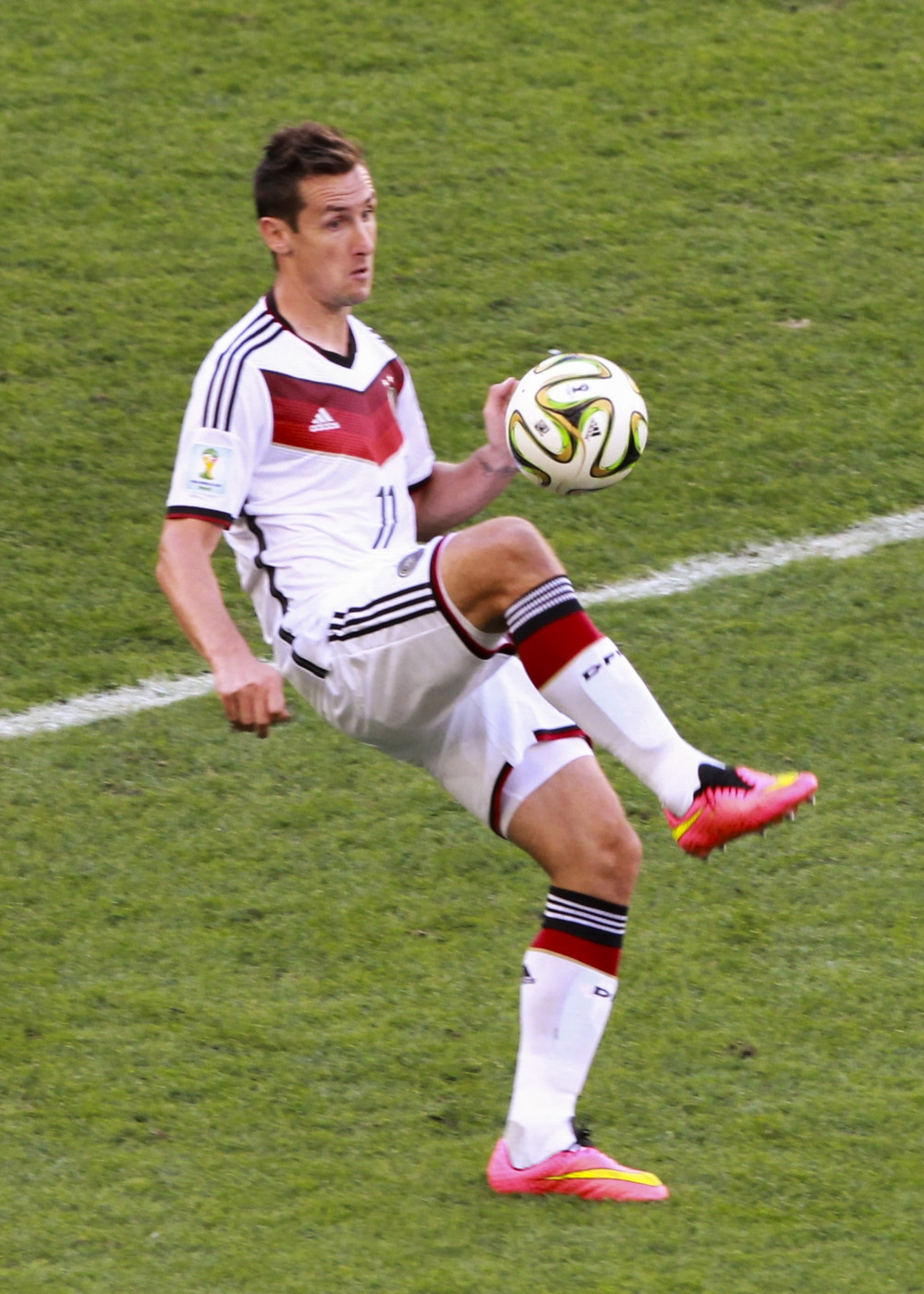
Miroslav Klose is Germany's all-time top scorer with 71 goals.

Rank	Player	Goals	Caps	Average	Period
1	Miroslav Klose (list)	71	137	0.52	2001–2014
2	Gerd Müller (list)	68	62	1.1	1966–1974
3	Lukas Podolski	49	130	0.38	2004–2017
4	Rudi Völler	47	90	0.52	1982–1994
4	Jürgen Klinsmann	47	108	0.44	1987–1998
6	Karl-Heinz Rummenigge	45	95	0.47	1976–1986
6	Thomas Müller	45	131	0.34	2010–2024
8	Uwe Seeler	43	72	0.6	1954–1970
9	Michael Ballack	42	98	0.43	1999–2010
10	Oliver Bierhoff	37	70	0.53	1996–2002

==== Captains ====
Player	Period	Notes
Fritz Szepan	1934–1939	
Paul Janes	1939–1942	
Fritz Walter	1951–1956	First official captain of the West Germany national football team World Cup winning captain (1954)
Hans Schäfer	1952–1962	First West German player to play in three World Cup tournaments (1954, 1958, 1962)
Helmut Rahn	1958–1959	
Herbert Erhardt	1959–1962	
Hans Schäfer	1962	
Uwe Seeler	1962–1970	
Wolfgang Overath	1970–1972	
Franz Beckenbauer	1972–1977	European Championship winning captain (1972); World Cup winning captain (1974)
Berti Vogts	1977–1978	
Sepp Maier	1978–1979	
Bernard Dietz	1979–1981	European Championship winning captain (1980)
Karl-Heinz Rummenigge	1981–1986	
Harald Schumacher	1986	
Klaus Allofs	1986–1987	
Lothar Matthäus	1987–1995	World Cup winning captain (1990); First captain of the unified Germany national football team
Jürgen Klinsmann	1995–1998	European Championship winning captain (1996)
Oliver Bierhoff	1998–2001	
Oliver Kahn	2001–2004	
Michael Ballack	2004–2010	
Philipp Lahm	2010–2014	World Cup winning captain (2014)
Bastian Schweinsteiger	2014–2016	
Manuel Neuer	2016–2017, 2017–2023	
Julian Draxler	2017	Confederations Cup winning captain (2017)
İlkay Gündoğan	2023–2024	
Joshua Kimmich	2024–present	

==== Player of the Year ====
- 2010: Bastian Schweinsteiger
- 2011: Mesut Özil
- 2012: Mesut Özil
- 2013: Mesut Özil
- 2014: Toni Kroos
- 2015: Mesut Özil
- 2016: Mesut Özil
- 2017: Joshua Kimmich
- 2018: Marco Reus
- 2019: Matthias Ginter
- 2020: Manuel Neuer
- 2021: Joshua Kimmich
- 2022: Jamal Musiala
- 2023: Emre Can
- 2024: Jamal Musiala

=== Manager records ===
Most manager appearances
Joachim Löw: 198

== Team records ==
=== 15 consecutive wins in all competitive matches ===
Date	Opponent	Venue		Result	Type	Scorers
10 July 2010	Uruguay	Port Elizabeth, RSA	*	3–2	WC 2010 3rd place	Müller 19', Jansen 56', Khedira 82'
3 September 2010	Belgium	Brussels, BEL	A	1–0	EC 2012 Qualification	Klose 51'
7 September 2010	Azerbaijan	Köln	H	6–1	EC 2012 Qualification	Westermann 28', Podolski 45+1', Klose 45+2', 90+2', Sadygov 53' (o.g.), Badstuber 86'
8 October 2010	Turkey	Berlin	H	3–0	EC 2012 Qualification	Klose 42', 87', Özil 79'
12 October 2010	Kazakhstan	Astana, KAZ	A	3–0	EC 2012 Qualification	Klose 48', Gómez 76', Podolski 85'
26 March 2011	Kazakhstan	Kaiserslautern	H	4–0	EC 2012 Qualification	Klose 3', 88', Müller 25', 43'
3 June 2011	Austria	Vienna, AUT	A	2–1	EC 2012 Qualification	Gómez 44', 90'
7 June 2011	Azerbaijan	Baku, AZE	A	3–1	EC 2012 Qualification	Özil 30', Gómez 41', Schürrle 90+3'
2 September 2011	Austria	Gelsenkirchen	H	6–2	EC 2012 Qualification	Klose 8', Özil 23', 47', Podolski 28', Schürrle 83', Götze 88'
7 October 2011	Turkey	Istanbul, TUR	A	3–1	EC 2012 Qualification	Gómez 35', Müller 66', Schweinsteiger 86' (pen.)
11 October 2011	Belgium	Düsseldorf	H	3–1	EC 2012 Qualification	Özil 30', Schürrle 33', Gómez 48'
9 June 2012	Portugal	Lviv, UKR	*	1–0	EC 2012 Group	Gómez 72'
13 June 2012	Netherlands	Kharkiv, UKR	*	2–1	EC 2012 Group	Gómez 24', 38'
17 June 2012	Denmark	Lviv, UKR	*	2–1	EC 2012 Group	Podolski 19', Bender 80'
22 June 2012	Greece	Gdańsk, POL	*	4–2	EC 2012 Quarter final	Lahm 39', Khedira 61', Klose 68', Reus 74'

== Competitive record ==
- 1930–1938 as → → Germany
- 1950–1990 as West Germany
- 1994–present as Germany

Champions Runners-up Third place Tournament played fully or partially on home soil

Germany has won the FIFA World Cup four times, behind only Brazil's five. It has finished as runners-up four times. In terms of semi-final appearances, Germany leads with 13, two more than Brazil's 11, who have participated in every single tournament. From 1954 to 2014 (16 tournaments), Germany were one of the last eight teams, before being eliminated in the group stage in 2018. Germany has also qualified for every one of the 19 World Cups for which it has entered – it did not enter the inaugural competition in Uruguay in 1930 for economic reasons, and were banned from the 1950 World Cup as the DFB was reinstated as a FIFA member only two months after this tournament.

Germany has also won the European Championship three times, one less than Spain. France and Italy, with two titles each, are the only other multiple winners. Germany finished as runners-up three times. The Germans have qualified for every European Championship tournament except for the first European Championship they entered in 1968. For that tournament, Germany was in the only group of three teams and thus only played four qualifying games. The deciding game was a scoreless draw in Albania which gave Yugoslavia the edge, having won in their neighbour country. The team finished outside the top eight in only three occasions: group stage eliminations in 2000 and 2004 alongside a round of 16 exit in 2020. In the other editions Germany participated in, they reached at least the semi-finals nine times, an unparalleled record in Europe.

See also East Germany and Saarland for the results of these separate Germany teams, and Austria for the team that was merged into the Germany national team from 1938 to 1945.

=== FIFA World Cup ===
FIFA World Cup record										Qualification record						
Year	Round	Position	Pld	W	D*	L	GF	GA	Squad	Pld	W	D	L	GF	GA	Campaign
(Uruguay) 1930	Did not enter									Did not enter						—
(Kingdom of Italy) 1934	Third place	3rd	4	3	0	1	11	8	Squad	1	1	0	0	9	1	1934
(French Third Republic) 1938	First round	10th	2	0	1	1	3	5	Squad	3	3	0	0	11	1	1938
(Fourth Brazilian Republic) 1950	Banned from entering									Banned from entering						1950
(Switzerland) 1954	Champions	1st	6	5	0	1	25	14	Squad	4	3	1	0	12	3	1954
(Sweden) 1958	Fourth place	4th	6	2	2	2	12	14	Squad	Qualified as defending champions						1958
(Chile) 1962	Quarter-finals	7th	4	2	1	1	4	2	Squad	4	4	0	0	11	5	1962
(England) 1966	Runners-up	2nd	6	4	1	1	15	6	Squad	4	3	1	0	14	2	1966
(Mexico) 1970	Third place	3rd	6	5	0	1	17	10	Squad	6	5	1	0	20	3	1970
(West Germany) 1974	Champions	1st	7	6	0	1	13	4	Squad	Qualified as hosts						1974
(Argentina) 1978	Quarter-finals (Note: Last 8 held as second group stage.)	6th	6	1	4	1	10	5	Squad	Qualified as defending champions						1978
(Spain) 1982	Runners-up	2nd	7	3	2	2	12	10	Squad	8	8	0	0	33	3	1982
(Mexico) 1986	Runners-up	2nd	7	3	2	2	8	7	Squad	8	5	2	1	22	9	1986
(Italy) 1990	Champions	1st	7	5	2	0	15	5	Squad	6	3	3	0	13	3	1990
(United States) 1994	Quarter-finals	5th	5	3	1	1	9	7	Squad	Qualified as defending champions						1994
(France) 1998	Quarter-finals	7th	5	3	1	1	8	6	Squad	10	6	4	0	23	9	1998
(South Korea) (Japan) 2002	Runners-up	2nd	7	5	1	1	14	3	Squad	10	6	3	1	19	12	2002
(Germany) 2006	Third place	3rd	7	5	1	1	14	6	Squad	Qualified as hosts						2006
(South Africa) 2010	Third place	3rd	7	5	0	2	16	5	Squad	10	8	2	0	26	5	2010
(Brazil) 2014	Champions	1st	7	6	1	0	18	4	Squad	10	9	1	0	36	10	2014
(Russia) 2018	Group stage	22nd	3	1	0	2	2	4	Squad	10	10	0	0	43	4	2018
(Qatar) 2022	Group stage	17th	3	1	1	1	6	5	Squad	10	9	0	1	36	4	2022
(Canada) (Mexico) (United States) 2026	Round of 32	18th	4	2	1	1	11	5	Squad	6	5	0	1	16	3	2026
(Morocco) (Portugal) (Spain) 2030	To be determined									To be determined						
(Saudi Arabia) 2034	To be determined									To be determined						
Total	4 Titles	21/23	116	70	22*	24	243	135	—	110	88	18	4	344	77	Total

* Denotes draws including knockout matches decided via penalty shoot-out.

=== FIFA Confederations Cup ===
FIFA Confederations Cup record
Year	Round	Position	Pld	W	D*	L	GF	GA	Squad
1992	Did not enter (Note: As 1990 FIFA World Cup champions)								
1995	Did not qualify								
1997	Did not enter (Note: As UEFA Euro 1996 champions)								
1999	Group stage	5th	3	1	0	2	2	6	Squad
2001	Did not qualify								
2003	Did not enter (Note: As 2002 FIFA World Cup runners-up)								
2005	Third place	3rd	5	3	1	1	15	11	Squad
2009	Did not qualify								
2013	Did not qualify								
2017	Champions	1st	5	4	1	0	12	5	Squad
Total	1 Title	3/10	13	8	2	3	29	22	—

* Denotes draws including knockout matches decided via penalty shoot-out.

=== UEFA European Championship ===
UEFA European Championship record										Qualification record						
Year	Round	Position	Pld	W	D*	L	GF	GA	Squad	Pld	W	D	L	GF	GA	Campaign
(France) 1960	Did not enter									Did not enter						
(Spain) 1964	Did not enter									Did not enter						
(Italy) 1968	Did not qualify									4	2	1	1	9	2	1968
(Belgium) 1972	Champions	1st	2	2	0	0	5	1	Squad	8	5	3	0	13	3	1972
(Socialist Federal Republic of Yugoslavia) 1976	Runners-up	2nd	2	1	1*	0	6	4	Squad	8	4	4	0	17	5	1976
(Italy) 1980	Champions	1st	4	3	1	0	6	3	Squad	6	4	2	0	17	1	1980
(France) 1984	Group stage	5th	3	1	1	1	2	2	Squad	8	5	1	2	15	5	1984
(West Germany) 1988	Semi-finals	3rd	4	2	1	1	6	3	Squad	Qualified as hosts						
(Sweden) 1992	Runners-up	2nd	5	2	1	2	7	8	Squad	6	5	0	1	13	4	1992
(England) 1996	Champions	1st	6	4	2*	0	10	3	Squad	10	8	1	1	27	10	1996
(Belgium) (Netherlands) 2000	Group stage	15th	3	0	1	2	1	5	Squad	8	6	1	1	20	4	2000
(Portugal) 2004	Group stage	12th	3	0	2	1	2	3	Squad	8	5	3	0	13	4	2004
(Austria) (Switzerland) 2008	Runners-up	2nd	6	4	0	2	10	7	Squad	12	8	3	1	35	7	2008
(Poland) (Ukraine) 2012	Semi-finals	3rd	5	4	0	1	10	6	Squad	10	10	0	0	34	7	2012
(France) 2016	Semi-finals	3rd	6	3	2*	1	7	3	Squad	10	7	1	2	24	9	2016
(Europe) 2020	Round of 16	15th	4	1	1	2	6	7	Squad	8	7	0	1	30	7	2020
(Germany) 2024	Quarter-finals	5th	5	3	1	1	11	4	Squad	Qualified as hosts						
(United Kingdom) (Republic of Ireland) 2028	To be determined									To be determined						2028
(Italy) (Turkey) 2032	To be determined									To be determined						2032
Total	3 Titles	14/17	58	30	14*	14	89	59	—	106	76	20	10	267	68	Total

* Denotes draws include knockout matches decided via penalty shoot-out.

=== UEFA Nations League ===
UEFA Nations League record
League phase / quarter-finals												Finals								
Season	LG	Grp	Pos	Pld	W	D	L	GF	GA	P/R	IR	Year	Pld	W	D*	L	GF	GA	Squad	Pos
2018–19	A	1	3rd	4	0	2	2	3	7	Same position	11th	(Portugal) 2019	Did not qualify							
2020–21	A	4	2nd	6	2	3	1	10	13	Same position	8th	(Italy) 2021	Did not qualify							
2022–23	A	3	3rd	6	1	4	1	11	9	Same position	10th	(Netherlands) 2023	Did not qualify							
2024–25	A	3	1st	6	4	2	0	18	4	Same position	2nd	(Germany) 2025	2	0	0	2	1	4	Squad	4th
2024–25	A	Quarter-final		2	1	1	0	5	4	Same position	2nd	(Germany) 2025	2	0	0	2	1	4	Squad	4th
2026–27	A	2	1st	6	3	2	1	11	3	Same position	4th	2027	To be determined							
2026–27	A	Quarter-final		0	0	0	0	0	0	Same position	4th	2027	To be determined							
Total				30	11	14	5	58	40	2nd		Total	2	0	0	2	1	4	-	4th

* Denotes draws including knockout matches decided via penalty shoot-out.

=== Olympic Games ===
Olympic Games record										Qualification record						
Year	Round	Position	Pld	W	D*	L	GF	GA	Squad	Pld	W	D	L	GF	GA	Campaign
(France) 1900	Did not enter									Did not enter						—
(United States) 1904	Did not enter									Did not enter						—
(United Kingdom) 1908	Did not enter									Did not enter						—
(Sweden) 1912	First round	7th	3	1	0	2	18	8	Squad	Invited						—
(Belgium) 1920	Banned									Banned						—
(France) 1924	Banned									Banned						—
(Netherlands) 1928	Quarter-finals	5th	2	1	0	1	5	4	Squad	Invited						—
(Germany) 1936	Quarter-finals	6th	2	1	0	1	9	2	Squad	Qualified as hosts						—
(United Kingdom) 1948	Banned									Banned						—
(Finland) 1952	Fourth place	4th	4	2	0	2	8	8	Squad	Invited						—
(Australia) 1956 (Note: A team from West Germany made up the United Team of Germany)	First round	9th	1	0	0	1	1	2	Squad	Automatic qualification						1956
(Italy) 1960	Did not qualify									6	3	0	3	9	11	1960
(Japan) 1964 (Note: East Germany won the play-off and represented the United Team of Germany)	Did not qualify									2	1	0	1	2	4	1964
(Mexico) 1968	Did not qualify									2	1	0	1	1	2	1968
(West Germany) 1972	Second round	5th	6	3	1	2	17	8	Squad	Qualified as hosts						1972
(Canada) 1976	Did not qualify									2	0	1	1	2	3	1976
(Soviet Union) 1980	Did not enter									Did not enter						1980
(United States) 1984	Quarter-finals	5th	4	2	0	2	10	6	Squad	6	3	1	2	8	5	1984
(South Korea) 1988	Bronze medal	3rd	6	4	1	1	16	4	Squad	8	5	2	1	16	4	1988
(Spain) 1992	Did not qualify									UEFA European Under-21 Championship						1992
(United States) 1996	Did not qualify									UEFA European Under-21 Championship						1996
(Australia) 2000	Did not qualify									UEFA European Under-21 Championship						2000
(Greece) 2004	Did not qualify									UEFA European Under-21 Championship						2004
(China) 2008	Did not qualify									UEFA European Under-21 Championship						2008
(United Kingdom) 2012	Did not qualify									UEFA European Under-21 Championship						2012
(Brazil) 2016	Silver medal	2nd	6	3	3	0	22	6	Squad	UEFA European Under-21 Championship						2016
(Japan) 2020	Group stage	9th	3	1	1	1	6	7	Squad	UEFA European Under-21 Championship						2020
(France) 2024	Did not qualify									UEFA European Under-21 Championship						2024
(United States) 2028	To be determined									To be determined						
(Australia) 2032	To be determined									To be determined						
Total	Bronze medal	10/28	37	18	6*	13	112	55	—	26	13	4	9	38	29	Total

* Denotes draws including knockout matches decided via penalty shoot-out.
** Red border indicates tournament was held on home soil.

== Honours ==
=== Global ===
- FIFA World Cup
  - Champions: 1954, 1974, 1990, 2014
  - Runners-up: 1966, 1982, 1986, 2002
  - Third place: 1934, 1970, 2006, 2010
- Olympic Games
  - Bronze Medal: 1988^{1}
- FIFA Confederations Cup
  - Champions: 2017
  - Third place: 2005

=== Continental ===
- UEFA European Championship
  - Champions: 1972, 1980, 1996
  - Runners-up: 1976, 1992, 2008

=== Friendly ===
- U.S. Cup
  - Champions: 1993
- Swiss Centenary Tournament
  - Champions: 1995
- Four Nations Tournament
  - Third place: 1988
- Azteca 2000 Tournament
  - Third place: 1985

=== Awards ===
- FIFA Team of the Year: 1993, 2014, 2017
- Laureus World Sports Award for Team of the Year: 2015
- World Soccer World Team of the Year: 1990, 2014
- Gazzetta Sports World Team of the Year: 1980, 1990, 2014
- FIFA World Cup Fair Play Trophy: 1974
- FIFA Confederations Cup Fair Play Award: 2017
- German Sports Team of the Year: 1966, 1970, 1974, 1980, 1990, 1996, 2002, 2006, 2010, 2014
- Silbernes Lorbeerblatt: 1954, 1972, 1974, 1980, 1990, 1996, 2014
- Bambi Award: 1986, 1996
- Deutscher Fernsehpreis: 2010
- Golden Hen: 2006, 2010, 2014

=== Summary ===
Competition	1st place, gold medalist(s)	2nd place, silver medalist(s)	3rd place, bronze medalist(s)	Total
FIFA World Cup	4	4	4	12
FIFA Confederations Cup	1	0	1	2
UEFA European Championship	3	3	0	6
Total	8	7	5	20

Notes

1. The Germany Olympic football team participated, officially not recognized by FIFA in the senior team records. West Germany is the official predecessor of current Germany. All the results obtained by the East Germany national football team are officially excluded.

== See also ==
- Germany national football team results
- Germany national football team manager
- Germany Olympic football team
- Germany national under-21 football team
- Germany national youth football team (includes U-15, U-16, U-17, U-18, U-19 and U-20 squads)
- Germany women's national football team
- East Germany national football team
- East Germany Olympic football team
- Germany–England
- Germany–France
- Germany–Italy
- Germany–Netherlands

== Notes ==
Achievements
Preceded by 1950 Uruguay	World Champions; 1954 (First title)	Succeeded by 1958 Brazil
Preceded by 1970 Brazil	World Champions; 1974 (Second title)	Succeeded by 1978 Argentina
Preceded by 1986 Argentina	World Champions; 1990 (Third title)	Succeeded by 1994 Brazil
Preceded by 2010 Spain	World Champions; 2014 (Fourth title)	Succeeded by 2018 France
Preceded by 1968 Italy	European Champions; 1972 (First title)	Succeeded by 1976 Czechoslovakia
Preceded by 1976 Czechoslovakia	European Champions; 1980 (Second title)	Succeeded by 1984 France
Preceded by 1992 Denmark	European Champions; 1996 (Third title)	Succeeded by 2000 France
Preceded by 1972 Poland	Summer Olympics; 1976 (First title)	Succeeded by 1980 Czechoslovakia
Preceded by 2013 Brazil	Confederations Champions; 2017 (First title)	Succeeded by abolished
Awards
Preceded by Award established	FIFA Team of the Year; 1993	Succeeded by Brazil
Preceded by Spain	FIFA Team of the Year; 2014	Succeeded by Belgium
Preceded by Argentina	FIFA Team of the Year; 2017	Succeeded by Belgium
Preceded by Bayern Munich	Laureus Team of the Year; 2015	Succeeded by New Zealand rugby union
