= 1974 FIFA World Cup Group 4 =

Football tournament group stage

Group 4 of the 1974 FIFA World Cup was contested between 15 and 23 June 1974. This group is played on two sites: Munich and Stuttgart.

The pool is seeded by Italy (Pot 1-Western Europe) accompanied by Poland (Pot 2-Eastern Europe), Argentina (Pot 3-South America), and Haiti (Pot 4-Rest of the world).

== Standings ==
Pos	Team	Pld	W	D	L	GF	GA	GD	Pts	Qualification
1	Poland	3	3	0	0	12	3	+9	6	Advance to second round
2	Argentina	3	1	1	1	7	5	+2	3	Advance to second round
3	Italy	3	1	1	1	5	4	+1	3	
4	Haiti	3	0	0	3	2	14	−12	0	

Source: FIFA

== Matches ==
All times listed are local (CET)

=== Italy vs Haiti ===
15 June 1974
18:00 CET

Italy	3–1	Haiti
Rivera 52'; Benetti 66'; Anastasi 79'		Sanon 46'

Olympiastadion, Munich
Attendance: 53,000
Referee: Vicente Llobregat (Venezuela)

Italy	Haiti

GK	1	Dino Zoff
SW	6	Tarcisio Burgnich
RB	2	Luciano Spinosi
CB	5	Francesco Morini
LB	3	Giacinto Facchetti (c)
CM	4	Romeo Benetti
CM	8	Fabio Capello
CM	10	Gianni Rivera
RW	7	Sandro Mazzola
CF	9	Giorgio Chinaglia	(substituted off) 70'
CF	11	Gigi Riva
Substitutions:
CF	19	Pietro Anastasi	(substituted on) 70'
Manager:
Ferruccio Valcareggi

GK	1	Henri Françillon
SW	12	Ernst Jean-Joseph
RB	6	Pierre Bayonne	(yellow card) 65'
CB	14	Wilner Nazaire (c)
LB	3	Arsène Auguste
CM	8	Jean-Claude Désir
CM	7	Philippe Vorbe
CM	10	Guy François
RW	9	Eddy Antoine
CF	20	Emmanuel Sanon
CF	11	Guy Saint-Vil		(substituted off) 46'
Substitutions:
CF	18	Claude Barthélemy		(substituted on) 46'
Manager:
Antoine Tassy

Assistant referees:
Armando Marques (Brazil)
Jafar Namdar (Iran)

=== Poland vs Argentina ===
15 June 1974
18:00 CET

Poland	3–2	Argentina
Lato 7', 62'; Szarmach 8'		Heredia 60'; Babington 66'

Neckarstadion, Stuttgart
Attendance: 32,700
Referee: Clive Thomas (Wales)

Poland	Argentina

GK	2	Jan Tomaszewski
SW	6	Jerzy Gorgoń
RB	4	Antoni Szymanowski
CB	9	Władysław Żmuda
LB	10	Adam Musiał
CM	13	Henryk Kasperczak
CM	12	Kazimierz Deyna (c)
CM	14	Zygmunt Maszczyk
RW	16	Grzegorz Lato
LW	18	Robert Gadocha	(substituted off) 85'
CF	17	Andrzej Szarmach	(substituted off) 70'
Substitutions:
CF	19	Jan Domarski	(substituted on) 70'
CM	11	Lesław Ćmikiewicz	(substituted on) 85'
Manager:
Kazimierz Górski

GK	1	Daniel Carnevali
RB	20	Enrique Wolff
CB	14	Roberto Perfumo (c)	(yellow card) 21'
CB	10	Ramón Heredia
LB	16	Francisco Sá
DM	5	Ángel Bargas		(substituted off) 67'
CM	4	Agustín Balbuena
CM	3	Carlos Babington	(yellow card) 47'
AM	6	Miguel Ángel Brindisi		(substituted off) 46'
CF	2	Rubén Ayala
CF	13	Mario Kempes
Substitutions:
RW	11	René Houseman		(substituted on) 46'
DM	18	Roberto Telch		(substituted on) 67'
Manager:
Vladislao Cap

Assistant referees:
Tony Boskovic (Australia)
Hans-Joachim Weyland (Germany)

=== Argentina vs Italy ===
19 June 1974
19:30 CET

Argentina	1–1	Italy
Houseman 20'		Perfumo 35' (o.g.)

Neckarstadion, Stuttgart
Attendance: 70,100
Referee: Pavel Kazakov (Soviet Union)

Argentina	Italy

GK	1	Daniel Carnevali
RB	20	Enrique Wolff		(substituted off) 60'
CB	14	Roberto Perfumo (c)
CB	10	Ramón Heredia
LB	16	Francisco Sá
MF	18	Roberto Telch
MF	3	Carlos Babington	(yellow card) 54'
MF	13	Mario Kempes
FW	11	René Houseman
FW	2	Rubén Ayala
CF	22	Héctor Yazalde		(substituted off) 78'
Substitutions:
RB	9	Rubén Glaria		(substituted on) 60'
CM	8	Enrique Chazarreta		(substituted on) 78'
Manager:
Vladislao Cap

GK	1	Dino Zoff
SW	6	Tarcisio Burgnich
RB	2	Luciano Spinosi
CB	5	Francesco Morini		(substituted off) 66'
LB	3	Giacinto Facchetti (c)
CM	4	Romeo Benetti	(yellow card) 48'
CM	8	Fabio Capello
CM	10	Gianni Rivera		(substituted off) 66'
RW	7	Sandro Mazzola
CF	19	Pietro Anastasi
CF	11	Gigi Riva
Substitutions:
SW	15	Giuseppe Wilson		(substituted on) 66'
RW	18	Franco Causio		(substituted on) 66'
Manager:
Ferruccio Valcareggi

Assistant referees:
Vincente Llobregat (Venezuela)
Ramón Barreto (Uruguay)

=== Haiti vs Poland ===
19 June 1974
19:30 CET

Haiti	0–7	Poland
		Lato 17', 87'; Deyna 18'; Szarmach 30', 34', 50'; Gorgoń 31'

Olympiastadion, Munich
Attendance: 25,300
Referee: Govindasamy Suppiah (Singapore)

Haiti	Poland

GK	1	Henri Françillon
SW	4	Fritz André		(substituted off) 37'
RB	6	Pierre Bayonne	(yellow card) 71'
CB	14	Wilner Nazaire (c)
LB	3	Arsène Auguste
CM	8	Jean-Claude Désir
CM	7	Philippe Vorbe
CM	10	Guy François
RW	9	Eddy Antoine
CF	20	Emmanuel Sanon
CF	15	Roger Saint-Vil		(substituted off) 46'
Substitutions:
CF	18	Claude Barthélemy		(substituted on) 37'
CM	13	Serge Racine		(substituted on) 46'
Manager:
Antoine Tassy

GK	2	Jan Tomaszewski
SW	6	Jerzy Gorgoń
RB	4	Antoni Szymanowski
CB	9	Władysław Żmuda
LB	10	Adam Musiał	(substituted off) 71'
CM	13	Henryk Kasperczak
CM	12	Kazimierz Deyna (c)
CM	14	Zygmunt Maszczyk	(substituted off) 65'
RW	16	Grzegorz Lato
LW	18	Robert Gadocha
CF	17	Andrzej Szarmach
Substitutions:
CM	11	Lesław Ćmikiewicz	(substituted on) 65'
RB	5	Zbigniew Gut	(substituted on) 71'
Manager:
Kazimierz Górski

Assistant referees:
Károly Palotai (Hungary)
Erich Linemayr (Austria)

=== Argentina vs Haiti ===
23 June 1974
16:00 CET

Argentina	4–1	Haiti
Yazalde 15', 68'; Houseman 18'; Ayala 55'		Sanon 63'

Olympiastadion, Munich
Attendance: 25,900
Referee: Pablo Sánchez Ibáñez (Spain)

Argentina	Haiti

GK	1	Daniel Carnevali
RB	20	Enrique Wolff
CB	14	Roberto Perfumo (c)
CB	10	Ramón Heredia	(yellow card) 60'
LB	16	Francisco Sá
MF	18	Roberto Telch
MF	3	Carlos Babington	(yellow card) 26'
MF	13	Mario Kempes		(substituted off) 52'
FW	11	René Houseman		(substituted off) 57'
FW	2	Rubén Ayala
CF	22	Héctor Yazalde
Substitutions:
MF	4	Agustín Balbuena		(substituted on) 52'
MF	6	Miguel Ángel Brindisi		(substituted on) 57'
Manager:
Vladislao Cap

GK	1	Henri Françillon
DF	6	Pierre Bayonne
DF	21	Wilfried Louis
DF	14	Wilner Nazaire (c)		(substituted off) 25'
DF	5	Serge Ducosté
MF	8	Jean-Claude Désir
MF	7	Philippe Vorbe
MF	13	Serge Racine
RW	9	Eddy Antoine
CF	20	Emmanuel Sanon
CF	11	Guy Saint-Vil		(substituted off) 52'
Substitutions:
MF	17	Joseph-Marion Leandré		(substituted on) 25'
FW	16	Fritz Leandré	(yellow card) 85'	(substituted on) 52'
Manager:
Antoine Tassy

Assistant referees:
Kurt Tschenscher (West Germany)
Rudi Glöckner (East Germany)

=== Poland vs Italy ===
23 June 1974
16:00 CET

Poland	2–1	Italy
Szarmach 38'; Deyna 44'		Capello 85'

Neckarstadion, Stuttgart
Attendance: 70,100
Referee: Hans-Joachim Weyland (West Germany)

Poland	Italy

GK	2	Jan Tomaszewski
SW	6	Jerzy Gorgoń
RB	4	Antoni Szymanowski
CB	9	Władysław Żmuda
LB	10	Adam Musiał	(yellow card) 84'
CM	13	Henryk Kasperczak	(yellow card) 25'
CM	12	Kazimierz Deyna (c)
CM	14	Zygmunt Maszczyk
RW	16	Grzegorz Lato
LW	18	Robert Gadocha
CF	17	Andrzej Szarmach		(substituted off) 78'
Substitutions:
CM	11	Lesław Ćmikiewicz		(substituted on) 78'
Manager:
Kazimierz Górski

GK	1	Dino Zoff
SW	6	Tarcisio Burgnich		(substituted off) 33'
RB	2	Luciano Spinosi
CB	5	Francesco Morini
LB	3	Giacinto Facchetti (c)
CM	4	Romeo Benetti
CM	8	Fabio Capello
CM	7	Sandro Mazzola
RW	18	Franco Causio
CF	9	Giorgio Chinaglia		(substituted off) 46'
CF	19	Pietro Anastasi
Substitutions:
SW	15	Giuseppe Wilson		(substituted on) 33'
CF	20	Roberto Boninsegna	(yellow card) 71'	(substituted on) 46'
Manager:
Ferruccio Valcareggi

Assistant referees:
Werner Winsemann (Canada)
Garhard Schulenburg (West Germany)

== See also ==
- Argentina at the FIFA World Cup
- Haiti at the FIFA World Cup
- Italy at the FIFA World Cup
- Poland at the FIFA World Cup
