= Haiti at the FIFA World Cup =

International football delegation

The FIFA World Cup, usually referred to simply as the World Cup, is an international association football competition contested by the men's national teams of the members of Fédération Internationale de Football Association (FIFA), the sport's global governing body. The championship has been awarded every four years since the first tournament in 1930, except in 1942 and 1946, due to World War II.

The tournament consists of two parts, the qualification phase and the final phase (officially called the World Cup Finals). The qualification phase, which currently take place over the three years preceding the Finals, is used to determine which teams qualify for the Finals. The current format of the Finals involves 48 teams competing for the title, at venues within the host nation (or nations) over a period of about a month. The World Cup final is the most widely viewed sporting event in the world, with an estimated 715.1 million people watching the 2006 tournament final.

Haiti have appeared twice at the FIFA World Cup, in 1974 and 2026. They lost all of their matches and exited in the first round on both occasions.

Before Haiti ever qualified for a major tournament, a Haitian player earned some notable World Cup glory: Joe Gaetjens, who had been playing for a New York–based club for several years at the time, represented the United States at the 1950 World Cup and scored the winning goal in a legendary 1–0 victory over England.

== Overall record ==
FIFA World Cup record
Year	Round	Position	Pld	W	D*	L	GF	GA	Squad
(Uruguay) 1930	Not a FIFA member								
(Italy) 1934	Did not qualify								
(France) 1938	Did not participate								
(Brazil) 1950	Did not participate								
(Switzerland) 1954	Did not qualify								
(Sweden) 1958	Did not participate								
(Chile) 1962	Did not participate								
(England) 1966	Did not participate								
(Mexico) 1970	Did not qualify								
(West Germany) 1974	Group stage	15th	3	0	0	3	2	14	Squad
(Argentina) 1978	Did not qualify								
(Spain) 1982	Did not qualify								
(Mexico) 1986	Did not qualify								
(Italy) 1990	Did not participate								
(United States) 1994	Did not qualify								
(France) 1998	Did not qualify								
(South Korea) (Japan) 2002	Did not qualify								
(Germany) 2006	Did not qualify								
(South Africa) 2010	Did not qualify								
(Brazil) 2014	Did not qualify								
(Russia) 2018	Did not qualify								
(Qatar) 2022	Did not qualify								
(Canada) (Mexico) (United States) 2026	Group stage	45th	3	0	0	3	2	8	Squad
(Morocco) (Portugal) (Spain) 2030	To be determined								
(Saudi Arabia) 2034	To be determined								
Total	Group stage	2/23	6	0	0	6	4	22	

*Draws include knockout matches decided via penalty shoot-out

=== By match ===
World Cup	Round	Opponent	Score	Result	Venue	Haiti scorers
1974	Group stage	Italy	1–3	Loss	Munich	E. Sanon
1974	Group stage	Poland	0–7	Loss	Munich	—
1974	Group stage	Argentina	1–4	Loss	Munich	E. Sanon
2026	Group stage	Scotland	0–1	Loss	Foxborough	—
2026	Group stage	Brazil	0–3	Loss	Philadelphia	—
2026	Group stage	Morocco	2–4	Loss	Atlanta	Y. Bounou (o.g.), W. Isidor

== Head-to-head record ==
Opponent	Pld	W	D	L	GF	GA	GD	Win %
Argentina	1	0	0	1	1	4	−3	0.00
Brazil	1	0	0	1	0	3	−3	0.00
Italy	1	0	0	1	1	3	−2	0.00
Morocco	1	0	0	1	2	4	−2	0.00
Poland	1	0	0	1	0	7	−7	0.00
Scotland	1	0	0	1	0	1	−1	0.00
Total	6	0	0	6	4	22	−18	0.00

== Haiti at the 1974 World Cup ==
=== Squad ===
Head coach: Antoine Tassy

No.	Pos.	Player	Date of birth (age)	Caps	Club
1	GK	Henri Françillon	26 May 1946 (aged 28)		(Haiti) Victory SC
2	GK	Wilner Piquant	12 October 1949 (aged 24)		(Haiti) Violette
3	DF	Arsène Auguste	3 February 1951 (aged 23)		(Haiti) Racing Club Haïtien
4	DF	Fritz André	18 September 1946 (aged 27)		(Haiti) Violette
5	DF	Serge Ducosté	4 February 1944 (aged 30)		(Haiti) Aigle Noir AC
6	DF	Pierre Bayonne	11 June 1949 (aged 25)		(Haiti) Violette
7	MF	Philippe Vorbe	14 September 1947 (aged 26)		(Haiti) Violette
8	MF	Jean-Claude Désir	8 August 1946 (aged 27)		(Haiti) Aigle Noir AC
9	MF	Eddy Antoine	27 August 1949 (aged 24)		(Haiti) Racing Club Haïtien
10	MF	Guy François	18 September 1947 (aged 26)		(Haiti) Violette
11	FW	Guy Saint-Vil	21 October 1942 (aged 31)		(Haiti) Racing Club Haïtien
12	MF	Ernst Jean-Joseph	11 June 1948 (aged 26)		(Haiti) Violette
13	DF	Serge Racine	9 October 1951 (aged 22)		(Haiti) Aigle Noir AC
14	DF	Wilner Nazaire	30 March 1950 (aged 24)		(France) Valenciennes
15	FW	Roger Saint-Vil	8 December 1949 (aged 24)		(Trinidad and Tobago) Archibald FC
16	FW	Fritz Leandré	13 March 1948 (aged 26)		(Haiti) Racing Club Haïtien
17	MF	Joseph-Marion Leandré	9 May 1945 (aged 29)		(Haiti) Racing Club Haïtien
18	FW	Claude Barthélemy	9 May 1945 (aged 29)		(Haiti) Racing Club Haïtien
19	DF	Jean-Herbert Austin	23 February 1950 (aged 24)		(Haiti) Violette
20	FW	Emmanuel Sanon	25 June 1951 (aged 22)		(Haiti) Don Bosco
21	DF	Wilfried Louis	25 October 1949 (aged 24)		(Haiti) Don Bosco
22	GK	Gérard Joseph	22 October 1949 (aged 24)		(Haiti) Racing Club Haïtien

=== Group 4 ===
Team	Pld	W	D	L	GF	GA	GD	Pts
Poland	3	3	0	0	12	3	+9	6
Argentina	3	1	1	1	7	5	+2	3
Italy	3	1	1	1	5	4	+1	3
Haiti	3	0	0	3	2	14	−12	0

15 June 1974
18:00 CET

Italy	3 – 1	Haiti
Rivera 52'; Benetti 64'; Anastasi 78'	Report	Sanon 46'

Olympiastadion, Munich
Attendance: 51,100
Referee: Vicente Llobregat (Venezuela)

19 June 1974
19:30 CET

Haiti	0 – 7	Poland
	Report	Lato 17', 87'; Deyna 18'; Szarmach 30', 34', 50'; Gorgoń 31'

Olympiastadion, Munich
Attendance: 23,400
Referee: Govindasamay Suppiah (Singapore)

23 June 1974
16:00 CET

Argentina	4 – 1	Haiti
Yazalde 15', 68'; Houseman 18'; Ayala 55'	Report	Sanon 63'

Olympiastadion, Munich
Attendance: 24,000
Referee: Pablo Sánchez Ibáñez (Spain)

== Haiti at the 2026 World Cup ==
=== Group C ===
Pos	Team	Pld	W	D	L	GF	GA	GD	Pts	Qualification
1	Brazil	3	2	1	0	7	1	+6	7 (Note: Tied on head-to-head result (Brazil 1–1 Morocco). Overall goal difference was used as the tiebreaker.)	Advance to knockout stage
2	Morocco	3	2	1	0	6	3	+3	7	Advance to knockout stage
3	Scotland	3	1	0	2	1	4	−3	3	
4	Haiti	3	0	0	3	2	8	−6	0	

Source: FIFA
Rules for classification: Group stage tiebreakers
Notes:
June 13, 2026
9:00 p.m. UTC−4

Haiti	0–1	Scotland
	(Note: "Haiti vs Scotland | First Stage | FIFA World Cup 2026". FIFA. Retrieved June 13, 2026.; "Match Report – Group C – Haiti v. Scotland". FIFA. June 14, 2026. Retrieved June 14, 2026.; "Post match summary report – Group C – Haiti v. Scotland". FIFA. June 14, 2026. Retrieved June 14, 2026.)	McGinn 28'

Gillette Stadium, Foxborough
Attendance: 64,146
Referee: Mustapha Ghorbal (Algeria)

June 19, 2026
8:30 p.m. UTC−4

Brazil	3–0	Haiti
Cunha 23', 36'; Vinícius 45+3'	(Note: "Brazil vs Haiti | First Stage | FIFA World Cup 2026". FIFA. Retrieved June 20, 2026.; "Match Report – Group C – Brazil v. Haiti". FIFA. June 20, 2026. Retrieved June 20, 2026.; "Post match summary report – Group C – Brazil v. Haiti". FIFA. June 19, 2026. Retrieved June 20, 2026.)

Lincoln Financial Field, Philadelphia
Attendance: 68,324
Referee: Alejandro Hernández Hernández (Spain)

June 24, 2026
6:00 p.m. UTC−4

Morocco	4–2	Haiti
Hakimi 39'; Saibari 45+1'; Rahimi 78'; Yassine 89'	(Note: "Morocco vs Haiti | First Stage | FIFA World Cup 2026". FIFA. Retrieved June 25, 2026.; "Match Report – Group C – Morocco v. Haiti". FIFA. June 25, 2026. Retrieved June 25, 2026.; "Post match summary report – Group C – Morocco v. Haiti". FIFA. June 25, 2026. Retrieved June 25, 2026.)	Bounou 10' (o.g.); Isidor 43'

Mercedes-Benz Stadium, Atlanta
Attendance: 68,239
Referee: Danny Makkelie (Netherlands)

== Player records ==
=== Most appearances ===
Seven players were fielded in all three of Haiti's matches at the 1974 World Cup, and thirteen players in all three of their matches at the 2026 World Cup, making them record World Cup players for their country:

Rank	Player	Matches	World Cups
1	Eddy Antoine	3	1974
1	Pierre Bayonne	3	1974
1	Jean-Claude Désir	3	1974
1	Henri Françillon	3	1974
1	Wilner Nazaire	3	1974
1	Emmanuel Sanon	3	1974
1	Philippe Vorbe	3	1974
1	Ricardo Adé	3	2026
1	Carlens Arcus	3	2026
1	Jean-Ricner Bellegarde	3	2026
1	Josué Casimir	3	2026
1	Louicius Deedson	3	2026
1	Hannes Delcroix	3	2026
1	Martin Expérience	3	2026
1	Wilson Isidor	3	2026
1	Danley Jean Jacques	3	2026
1	Lenny Joseph	3	2026
1	Frantzdy Pierrot	3	2026
1	Johny Placide	3	2026
1	Ruben Providence	3	2026

=== Goalscorers ===
On 15 June 1974, Emmanuel Sanon made history by scoring Haiti's first-ever FIFA World Cup goal, coming in their first match against Italy in Munich. The own goal was scored by Morocco goalkeeper Yassine Bounou.

Player	Goals	1974	2026
Emmanuel Sanon	2	2	
Wilson Isidor	1		1
Own goals	1		1
Total	4	2	2

== See also ==
- Haiti at the CONCACAF Gold Cup
- Haiti at the Copa América
- North, Central American and Caribbean nations at the FIFA World Cup
