= 1974 FIFA World Cup knockout stage =

Football tournament

The knockout stage of 1974 FIFA World Cup was a single-elimination tournament involving the four teams that qualified from the second group stage of the tournament. There were two matches: a match for third place contested by the group runners-up, and the final to decide the champions, contested by the group winners. The knockout stage began with the match for third place on 6 July and ended with the final on 7 July 1974, both at the Olympiastadion in Munich. West Germany won the tournament with a 2–1 victory over the Netherlands.

== Qualified teams ==
The top two placed teams from each of the two groups of the second round qualified for the knockout stage.

Group	Winners (qualification for final)	Runners-up (qualification for match for third place)
A	Netherlands	Brazil
B	West Germany	Poland

== Match for third place ==
6 July 1974
16:00 CET

Brazil	0–1	Poland
		Lato 76'

Olympiastadion, Munich
Attendance: 77,100
Referee: Aurelio Angonese (Italy)

Brazil	Poland

GK	1	Émerson Leão
RB	4	Zé Maria
CB	3	Marinho Peres
CB	15	Alfredo
LB	6	Marinho Chagas
CM	17	Carpegiani
CM	10	Rivellino
AM	18	Ademir da Guia		(substituted off) 66'
RW	13	Valdomiro
LW	21	Dirceu
CF	7	Jairzinho	(yellow card) 76'
Substitutions:
CF	19	Mirandinha		(substituted on) 66'
Manager:
Mário Zagallo

GK	2	Jan Tomaszewski
SW	6	Jerzy Gorgoń
RB	4	Antoni Szymanowski
CB	9	Władysław Żmuda
LB	10	Adam Musiał
CM	13	Henryk Kasperczak	(yellow card) 71'	(substituted off) 73'
CM	12	Kazimierz Deyna
CM	14	Zygmunt Maszczyk
RW	16	Grzegorz Lato
LW	18	Robert Gadocha
CF	17	Andrzej Szarmach		(substituted off) 75'
Substitutions:
CM	11	Lesław Ćmikiewicz		(substituted on) 73'
CF	20	Zdzisław Kapka		(substituted on) 75'
Manager:
Kazimierz Górski

Assistant referees:
Jafar Namdar (Iran)
Youssou N'Diaye (Sénégal)

== Final ==
7 July 1974
16:00 UTC+1

Netherlands	1–2	West Germany
Neeskens 2' (pen.)		Breitner 25' (pen.); Müller 43'

Olympiastadion, Munich
Attendance: 78,200
Referee: Jack Taylor (England)

Netherlands	West Germany

GK	8	Jan Jongbloed
RB	20	Wim Suurbier
CB	17	Wim Rijsbergen		(substituted off) 69'
CB	2	Arie Haan
LB	12	Ruud Krol
DM	6	Wim Jansen
CM	13	Johan Neeskens	(yellow card) 40'
CM	3	Willem van Hanegem	(yellow card) 23'
RW	16	Johnny Rep
LW	15	Rob Rensenbrink		(substituted off) 46'
CF	14	Johan Cruyff (c)	(yellow card) 45'
Substitutes:
GK	18	Piet Schrijvers
DF	5	Rinus Israël
MF	7	Theo de Jong		(substituted on) 69'
FW	9	Piet Keizer
FW	10	René van de Kerkhof		(substituted on) 46'
Manager:
Rinus Michels

GK	1	Sepp Maier
SW	5	Franz Beckenbauer (c)
RB	2	Berti Vogts	(yellow card) 4'
CB	4	Hans-Georg Schwarzenbeck
LB	3	Paul Breitner
CM	16	Rainer Bonhof
CM	12	Wolfgang Overath
AM	14	Uli Hoeneß
RW	9	Jürgen Grabowski
LW	17	Bernd Hölzenbein
CF	13	Gerd Müller
Substitutes:
GK	21	Norbert Nigbur
DF	6	Horst-Dieter Höttges
MF	8	Bernhard Cullmann
FW	11	Jupp Heynckes
MF	15	Heinz Flohe
Manager:
Helmut Schön

Linesmen:
Ramón Barreto (Uruguay)
Alfonso González Archundia (Mexico)
