= 1974 FIFA World Cup Group B =

Football tournament group stage

Group B was one of two groups in the second group stage of the 1974 FIFA World Cup finals. It was the first time that this stage of the competition (equivalent to the quarter-finals) was played in a group format. Matches were played between 26 June and 3 July 1974 at venues in Düsseldorf, Frankfurt and Stuttgart. Group B was made up of the winners of Groups 2 and Groups 4 (Yugoslavia and Poland), and the runners-up from Groups 1 and Groups 3 (West Germany and Sweden).

Having each won both of their first two matches, West Germany and Poland went into their final match level on points with a place in the final at stake. West Germany won the match 1–0 and qualified to play against the Netherlands, while Poland finished second and went on to play in the match for third place against Brazil.

== Qualified teams ==
The winners of Group 2 and 4 and the runners-up of Group 1 and 3 qualified for Group B of the second round.

Group	Winners
2	Yugoslavia
4	Poland
Group	Runners-up
1	West Germany
3	Sweden

== Standings ==
Pos	Team	Pld	W	D	L	GF	GA	GD	Pts	Qualification
1	West Germany	3	3	0	0	7	2	+5	6	Advance to final
2	Poland	3	2	0	1	3	2	+1	4	Advance to match for third place
3	Sweden	3	1	0	2	4	6	−2	2	
4	Yugoslavia	3	0	0	3	2	6	−4	0	

Source: FIFA

== Matches ==
=== West Germany vs Yugoslavia ===
26 June 1974
16:00 CET

Yugoslavia	0–2	West Germany
		Breitner 39'; Müller 82'

Rheinstadion, Düsseldorf
Attendance: 67,385
Referee: Armando Marques (Brazil)

Yugoslavia	West Germany

GK	1	Enver Marić
DF	2	Ivan Buljan	(yellow card) 36'
DF	3	Enver Hadžiabdić	(yellow card) 61'
DF	4	Dražen Mužinić
DF	5	Josip Katalinski
CM	8	Branko Oblak		(substituted off) 84'
CM	10	Jovan Aćimović
AM	18	Stanislav Karasi
RW	17	Danilo Popivoda
LW	11	Dragan Džajić (c)		(substituted off) 84'
CF	9	Ivica Šurjak
Substitutions:
LW	7	Ilija Petković		(substituted on) 84'
CM	12	Jurica Jerković		(substituted on) 84'
Manager:
Miljan Miljanić

GK	1	Sepp Maier
SW	5	Franz Beckenbauer (c)
RB	2	Berti Vogts	(yellow card) 35'
CB	4	Hans-Georg Schwarzenbeck
LB	3	Paul Breitner
CM	7	Herbert Wimmer		(substituted off) 73'
CM	16	Rainer Bonhof
CM	12	Wolfgang Overath	(yellow card) 16'
RW	17	Bernd Hölzenbein		(substituted off) 78'
LW	18	Dieter Herzog
CF	13	Gerd Müller
Substitutions:
CM	14	Uli Hoeneß		(substituted on) 73'
MF	15	Heinz Flohe		(substituted on) 78'
Manager:
Helmut Schön

Linesmen:
Aurelio Angonese (Italy)
Edison Peréz Núñez (Peru)

=== Sweden vs Poland ===
26 June 1974
19:30 CET

Sweden	0–1	Poland
		Lato 43'

Neckarstadion, Stuttgart
Attendance: 44,955
Referee: Ramón Barreto (Uruguay)

Sweden	Poland

GK	1	Ronnie Hellström
SW	4	Björn Nordqvist
RB	5	Björn Andersson	(substituted off) 60'
CB	3	Kent Karlsson
LB	13	Roland Grip
CM	14	Staffan Tapper	(substituted off) 80'
CM	7	Bo Larsson (c)
AM	6	Ove Grahn
RW	8	Conny Torstensson
CF	10	Ralf Edström
CF	11	Roland Sandberg
Substitutions:
LB	18	Jörgen Augustsson	(substituted on) 60'
RW	22	Thomas Ahlström	(substituted on) 80'
Manager:
Georg Ericson

GK	2	Jan Tomaszewski
SW	6	Jerzy Gorgoń	(yellow card) 49'
RB	5	Zbigniew Gut
CB	9	Władysław Żmuda
LB	4	Antoni Szymanowski
CM	13	Henryk Kasperczak
CM	12	Kazimierz Deyna (c)
CM	14	Zygmunt Maszczyk
RW	16	Grzegorz Lato
LW	18	Robert Gadocha
CF	17	Andrzej Szarmach	(yellow card) 44'	(substituted off) 62'
Substitutions:
CF	21	Kazimierz Kmiecik		(substituted on) 62'
Manager:
Kazimierz Górski

Linesmen:
Alfonso González Archundia (Mexico)
Luis Pestarino (Argentina)

=== Poland vs Yugoslavia ===
30 June 1974
16:00 CET

Poland	2–1	Yugoslavia
Deyna 24' (pen.); Lato 62'		Karasi 43'

Waldstadion, Frankfurt
Attendance: 58,000
Referee: Rudi Glöckner (East Germany)

Poland	Yugoslavia

GK	2	Jan Tomaszewski
SW	6	Jerzy Gorgoń
RB	4	Antoni Szymanowski
CB	9	Władysław Żmuda
LB	10	Adam Musiał
CM	13	Henryk Kasperczak
CM	12	Kazimierz Deyna (c)	(substituted off) 80'
CM	14	Zygmunt Maszczyk
RW	16	Grzegorz Lato
LW	18	Robert Gadocha
CF	17	Andrzej Szarmach	(substituted off) 57'
Substitutions:
CM	11	Lesław Ćmikiewicz	(substituted on) 57'
CF	19	Jan Domarski	(substituted on) 80'
Manager:
Kazimierz Górski

GK	1	Enver Marić
SW	6	Vladislav Bogićević
RB	2	Ivan Buljan
CB	5	Josip Katalinski
LB	3	Enver Hadžiabdić
CM	8	Branko Oblak	(substituted off) 16'
CM	10	Jovan Aćimović (c)
AM	18	Stanislav Karasi
RW	7	Ilija Petković	(substituted off) 81'
LW	9	Ivica Šurjak
CF	19	Dušan Bajević
Substitutions:
CM	12	Jurica Jerković	(substituted on) 16'
RW	20	Vladimir Petrović	(substituted on) 81'
Manager:
Miljan Miljanić

Linesmen:
Armando Marques (Brazil)
Werner Winsemann (Canada)

=== West Germany vs Sweden ===
30 June 1974
19:30 CET

West Germany	4–2	Sweden
Overath 51'; Bonhof 52'; Grabowski 76'; Hoeneß 89' (pen.)		Edström 24'; Sandberg 53'

Rheinstadion, Düsseldorf
Attendance: 67,800
Referee: Pavel Kazakov (Soviet Union)

West Germany	Sweden

GK	1	Sepp Maier
SW	5	Franz Beckenbauer (c)
RB	2	Berti Vogts
CB	4	Hans-Georg Schwarzenbeck
LB	3	Paul Breitner
CM	14	Uli Hoeneß
CM	16	Rainer Bonhof
CM	12	Wolfgang Overath
RW	17	Bernd Hölzenbein	(substituted off) 83'
LW	18	Dieter Herzog	(substituted off) 64'
CF	13	Gerd Müller
Substitutions:
RW	9	Jürgen Grabowski	(substituted on) 64'
LW	15	Heinz Flohe	(substituted on) 83'
Manager:
Helmut Schön

GK	1	Ronnie Hellström
SW	4	Björn Nordqvist
RB	2	Jan Olsson
CB	3	Kent Karlsson
LB	18	Jörgen Augustsson
CM	14	Staffan Tapper
CM	7	Bo Larsson (c)		(substituted off) 32'
AM	6	Ove Grahn	(yellow card) 45'
RW	8	Conny Torstensson
CF	10	Ralf Edström
CF	11	Roland Sandberg
Substitutions:
RW	16	Inge Ejderstedt		(substituted on) 32'
Manager:
Georg Ericson

Linesmen:
Nicolae Rainea (Romania)
Pablo Sánchez Ibáñez (Spain)

=== Poland vs West Germany ===
3 July 1974
16:35 CET (Note: Originally scheduled for 16:00, the kick-off was delayed due to heavy rain, which created puddles on the pitch.)

Poland	0–1	West Germany
		Müller 76'

Waldstadion, Frankfurt
Attendance: 62,000
Referee: Erich Linemayr (Austria)

Poland	West Germany

GK	2	Jan Tomaszewski
SW	6	Jerzy Gorgoń
RB	4	Antoni Szymanowski
CB	9	Władysław Żmuda
LB	10	Adam Musiał
CM	13	Henryk Kasperczak	(substituted off) 80'
CM	12	Kazimierz Deyna (c)
CM	14	Zygmunt Maszczyk	(substituted off) 80'
RW	16	Grzegorz Lato
LW	18	Robert Gadocha
CF	19	Jan Domarski
Substitutions:
MF	11	Lesław Ćmikiewicz	(substituted on) 80'
FW	21	Kazimierz Kmiecik	(substituted on) 80'
Manager:
Kazimierz Górski

GK	1	Sepp Maier
SW	5	Franz Beckenbauer (c)
RB	2	Berti Vogts
CB	4	Hans-Georg Schwarzenbeck
LB	3	Paul Breitner
CM	14	Uli Hoeneß
CM	16	Rainer Bonhof
CM	12	Wolfgang Overath
RW	9	Jürgen Grabowski
LW	17	Bernd Hölzenbein
CF	13	Gerd Müller
Manager:
Helmut Schön

Linesmen:
Károly Palotai (Hungary)
Rudolf Scheurer (Switzerland)

=== Sweden vs Yugoslavia ===
3 July 1974
19:30 CET

Sweden	2–1	Yugoslavia
Edström 29'; Torstensson 85'		Šurjak 27'

Rheinstadion, Düsseldorf
Attendance: 41,300
Referee: Luis Pestarino (Argentina)

Sweden	Yugoslavia

GK	1	Ronnie Hellström
SW	4	Björn Nordqvist (c)
RB	2	Jan Olsson
CB	3	Kent Karlsson
LB	18	Jörgen Augustsson
CM	14	Staffan Tapper
CM	21	Örjan Persson
AM	6	Ove Grahn
RW	8	Conny Torstensson
CF	10	Ralf Edström
CF	11	Roland Sandberg
Manager:
Georg Ericson

GK	1	Enver Marić
DF	2	Ivan Buljan
DF	3	Enver Hadžiabdić
DF	5	Josip Katalinski	(yellow card) 26'
MF	6	Vladislav Bogićević
MF	10	Jovan Aćimović
MF	12	Jurica Jerković
MF	13	Miroslav Pavlović		(substituted off) 78'
MF	20	Vladimir Petrović		(substituted off) 70'
FW	9	Ivica Šurjak
FW	11	Dragan Džajić (c)
Substitutions:
FW	18	Stanislav Karasi	(yellow card) 86'	(substituted on) 70'
DF	14	Luka Peruzović		(substituted on) 78'
Manager:
Miljan Miljanić

Linesmen:
Ramón Barreto (Uruguay)
Vincente Llobregat (Venezuela)

== See also ==
- Germany at the FIFA World Cup
- Poland at the FIFA World Cup
- Sweden at the FIFA World Cup
- Yugoslavia at the FIFA World Cup
