= Wilner Piquant =

Haitian footballer (born 1951)

Personal information
- Full name: Wilner Piquant
- Date of birth: December 4, 1951 (age 74)
- Place of birth: Haiti
- Position: Goalkeeper

Senior career*
Years	Team	Apps	(Gls)
1973–1974	Aigle Noir AC		
1974–1975	Violette AC		
1978	Ottawa Tigers	20	(0)

International career
1971–1981	Haiti		
- * Club domestic league appearances and goals

Wilner Piquant (born 4 December 1951) is a Haitian former international footballer with Haitian club Violette A.C. who was part of the Haitian Squad at the World Cup in Germany in 1974. He played as a goalkeeper. Piquent played in three 1978 World Cup qualifiers and six 1982 World Cup qualifiers, the last of these being a 1–1 draw with Mexico in the 1981 CONCACAF Championship in Tegucigalpa. In 1978, he played in the National Soccer League with Ottawa Tigers.
