= MHPArena =

Stadium in Stuttgart, Baden-Württemberg, Germany

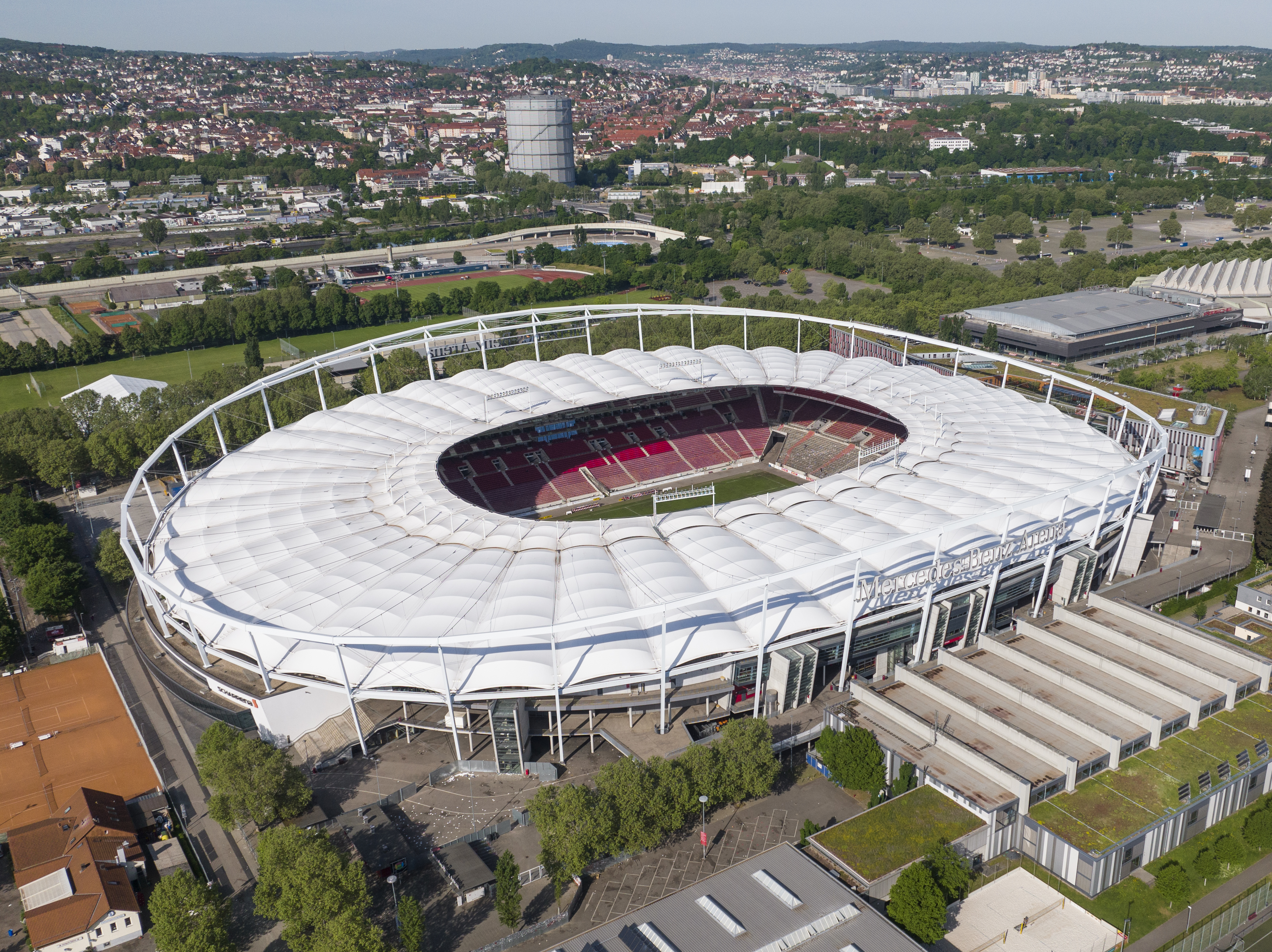
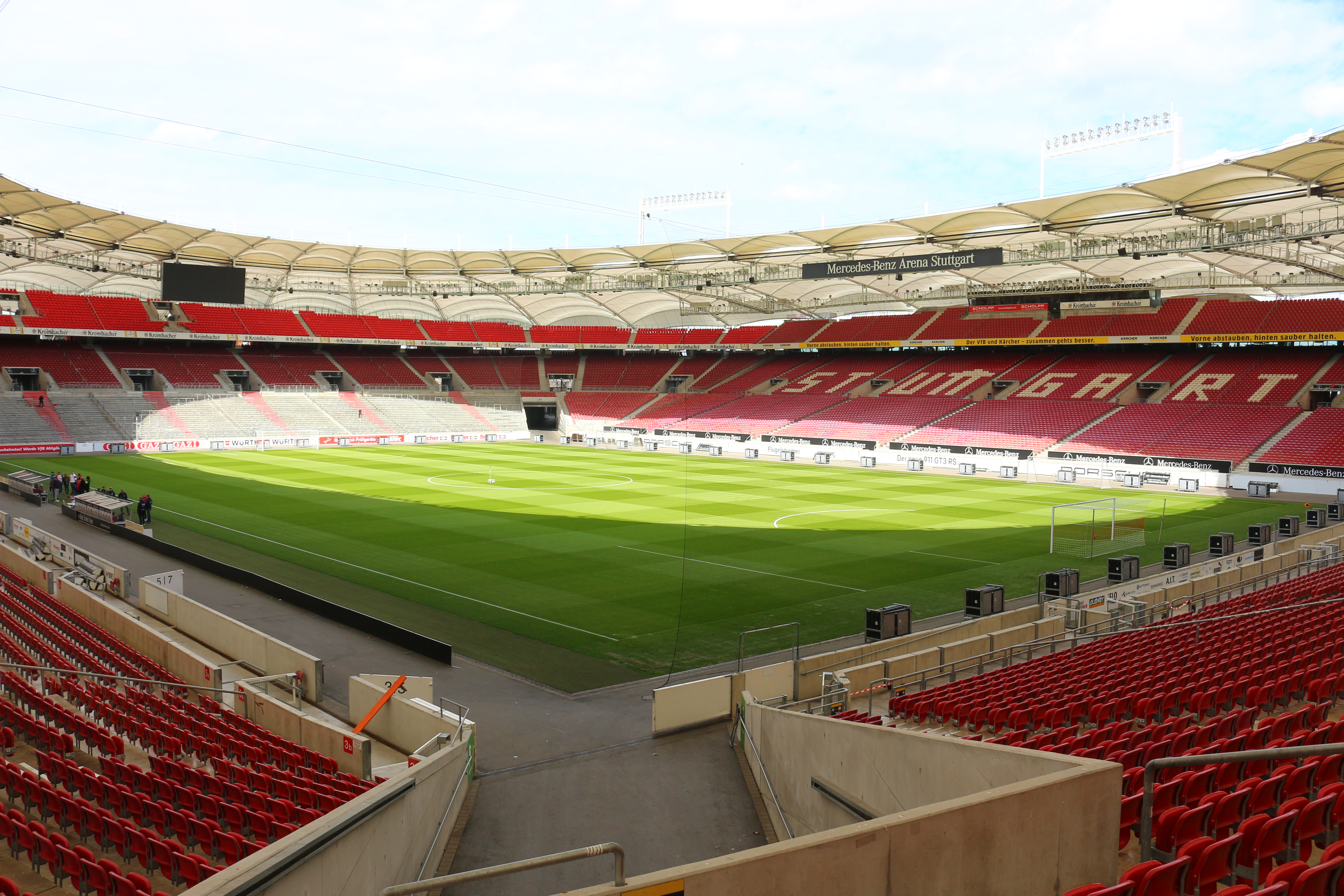
- UEFA
- Interactive map of MHPArena
- Former names: Stuttgarter Kampfbahn (1929–1933); Adolf-Hitler-Kampfbahn (1933–1945); Century Stadium (1945–1949); Neckarstadion (1949–1993); Gottlieb-Daimler-Stadion (1993–2008); Mercedes-Benz Arena (2008–2023)
- Address: Mercedesstraße 87, 70372
- Location: Stuttgart, Baden-Württemberg, Germany
- Coordinates: 48°47′32″N 9°13′55″E
- Owner: Stadion NeckarPark GmbH & Co. KG
- Operator: VfB Stuttgart Arena Betriebs GmbH
- Capacity: 60,058 (league matches), 54,812 (international matches)
- Surface: Natural grass
- Record attendance: 97,553 (Germany vs. Switzerland, 22 November 1950)
- Field size: 105 m × 68 m (344 ft × 223 ft)

Construction
- Built: 1929–1933
- Opened: 23 July 1933; 93 years ago
- Renovated: 1949–1951, 1999–2003, 2004–2005
- Expanded: 1993, 2009–2011, 2022–2024
- Cost: 2.3 million RM (1929–1933) €58 million (2004–2005) €63.5 million (2009–2011) €139.5 million (2022–2024)
- Architects: Paul Bonatz/Friedrich Scholer (1929–1933) 'asp' Architekten Stuttgart (2004–2005, 2009–2011, 2022–2024)

Tenants
- VfB Stuttgart (1933–present); Germany national football team (selected matches): Major sporting events hosted; 1959 European Cup Final; 1974 FIFA World Cup; 1986 European Athletics Championships; 1988 European Cup Final; UEFA Euro 1988; 1993 World Athletics Championships; 2006 FIFA World Cup; UEFA Euro 2024; 2025 UEFA Nations League Finals

Website
- www.mhparena-stuttgart.de

MHPArena (German pronunciation: [ɛmhaːpeː ʔaˌʁeːna]), formerly Neckarstadion, is a stadium located in Stuttgart, Baden-Württemberg, Germany, and home to Bundesliga club VfB Stuttgart. It hosted football matches in the 1974 FIFA World Cup, the UEFA Euro 1988, the 2006 FIFA World Cup, and the UEFA Euro 2024. Besides that the 1959 European Cup Final, the replay of the 1962 European Cup Winners' Cup final, the 1988 European Cup Final, and the second leg of the 1989 UEFA Cup final took place in the stadium. The stadium is the only venue in Europe to have hosted multiple World Cup, European Championship and European Cup/Champions League Final matches. The stadium hosted the 1986 European Athletics Championships and the 1993 World Athletics Championships before it was redeveloped into a football-specific stadium in 2009.

Before 1993 it was called the Neckarstadion ([ˈnɛkaʁˌʃtaːdi̯ɔn]), named after the nearby river Neckar. Between 1993 and July 2008 it was called the Gottlieb-Daimler-Stadion [ˌɡɔtliːpˈdaɪmlɐˌʃtaːdi̯ɔn]. The stadium was renamed the Mercedes-Benz Arena at the beginning of the 2008–09 season, starting with a pre-season friendly against Arsenal on 30 July 2008. On 1 July 2023, the stadium was renamed the MHPArena.

== Location ==
The MHPArena is located in the Bad Cannstatt borough of Stuttgart and is the centrepiece of the Neckarpark area. Directly on the north side of the stadium is the Carl Benz Center, an elongated experience centre for football fans. The Porsche-Arena and the Hanns-Martin-Schleyer-Halle follow immediately afterwards. To the south-east of the stadium are the VfB Stuttgart club grounds with training grounds, clubhouse and the Robert-Schlienz-Stadion, where the VfB Stuttgart youth teams play their matches. About 250 metres to the west of the stadium is the Cannstatter Wasen, where the annual Cannstatter Volksfest takes place.

== History ==
The stadium was originally built from 1929 to 1933 with the name "Stuttgarter Kampfbahn" after designs by German architects Paul Bonatz and Friedrich Scholer. After it was built, it was named "Adolf-Hitler-Kampfbahn" (pronounced [ˌadɔlfˈhɪtlɐˌkampfbaːn]) after the German dictator. From 1945 to 1949, it was called Century Stadium and later Kampfbahn, and was used by US Troops to play baseball. The name Neckarstadion has been used since 1949. It is home to VfB Stuttgart in the Bundesliga (and to the Stuttgarter Kickers when they played in the Bundesliga).

After a major refurbishment in the late 1980s and early 1990s partly financed by Daimler-Benz, the Stuttgart town council dedicated the stadium to Gottlieb Daimler. The inventor had tested both the first internal combustion motorcycle and the first 4-wheel automobile there in the 1880s, on the road from Cannstatt to Untertürkheim (now called Mercedesstraße). The Mercedes-Benz Group headquarters, the Mercedes-Benz Museum, and the Untertürkheim car plant are nearby.

The stadium capacity was temporarily reduced to around 42,300, after one stand (Untertürkheimer Kurve) was demolished during summer 2009 in the process of converting it to a pure football arena. The rebuilt arena was completed in November 2011 with a new capacity of 60,449, including terracing. Due to UEFA regulations, which only allow seating, the capacity was reduced to around 55,000 during international football matches.

As a result of the renovation work on the main stand, the capacity of the stadium was temporarily reduced to 47,500 seats in the 2022–23 season. Since construction work was completed in March 2024, the capacity is 60,058 for league matches and 54,812 for international matches.

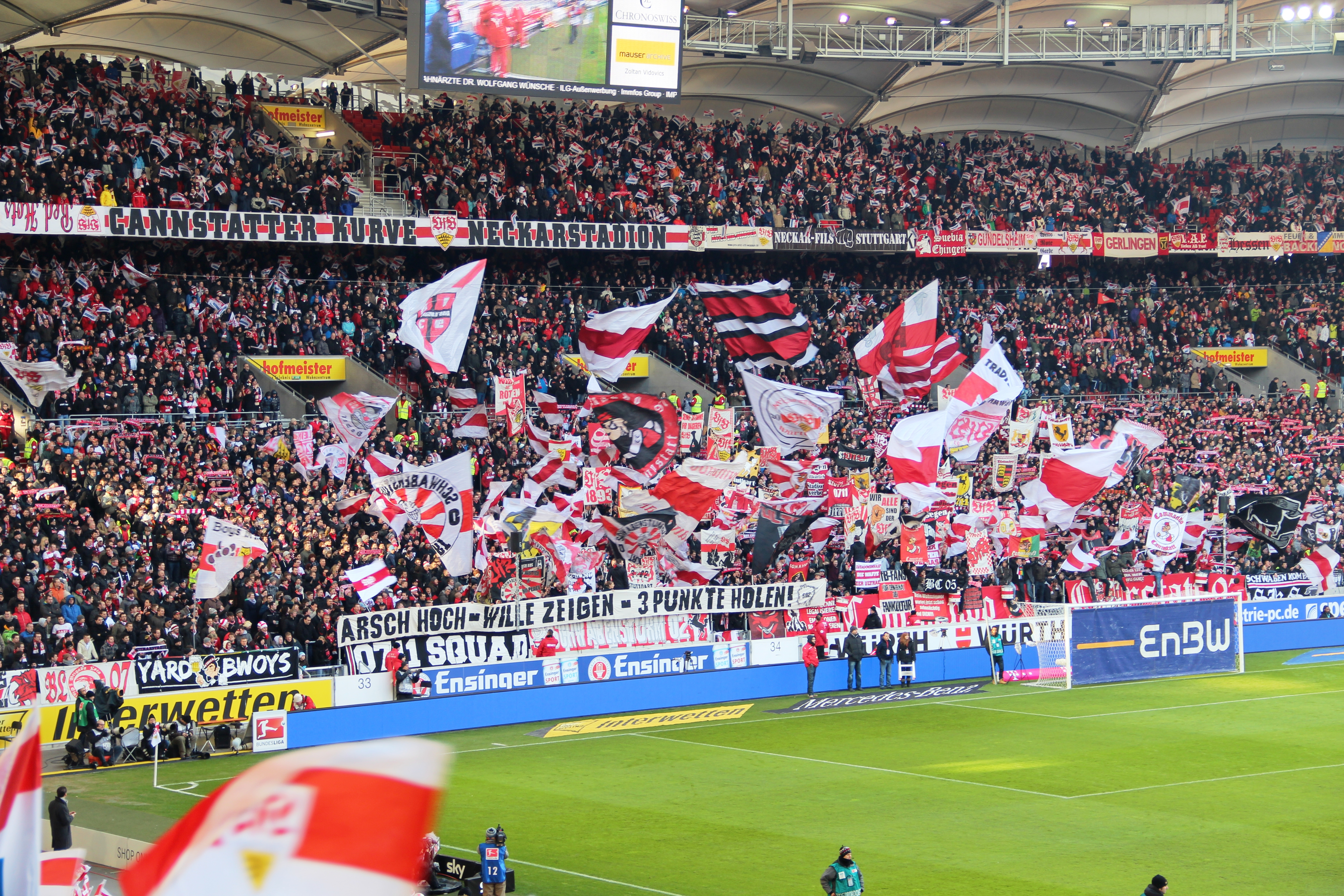
"Cannstatter Kurve" is the area for the fans of VfB Stuttgart.

It is divided into four sections,

- the Haupttribüne (main stand), adjacent to Mercedesstraße, housing VIP-lounges and press seats
- the Gegentribüne (opposite stand), formerly named EnBW-Tribüne and Kärcher-Tribüne after some of VfB Stuttgart's sponsors.
- the Cannstatter Kurve (Cannstatt Curve), to the left of the Haupttribüne, housing the ultras of VfB Stuttgart and one of two video walls. Before rebuilding it housed the A-Block, which was the original block of the ultras. Since 2011 the lower tier of the curve contains a standing area with 8,000 terraces.
- the Untertürkheimer Kurve (Untertürkheim Curve), to the right of the Haupttribüne, housing lounges, the blocks for the guest team's fans and the second video wall

The fabric roof construction of the MHPArena was designed by Schlaich Bergermann Partner. Made of precision-tailored membranes of PVC-coated polyester, the roof tissue is durable enough to withstand 1,000 kg of weight per square decimeter. It is suspended from an aesthetic steel frame that runs around the entire stadium weighing approximately 2,700 metric tons. The steel cables connecting the roof to the frame alone weigh about 420 tons. The roof was added during the refurbishment preceding the 1993 World Athletics Championships.

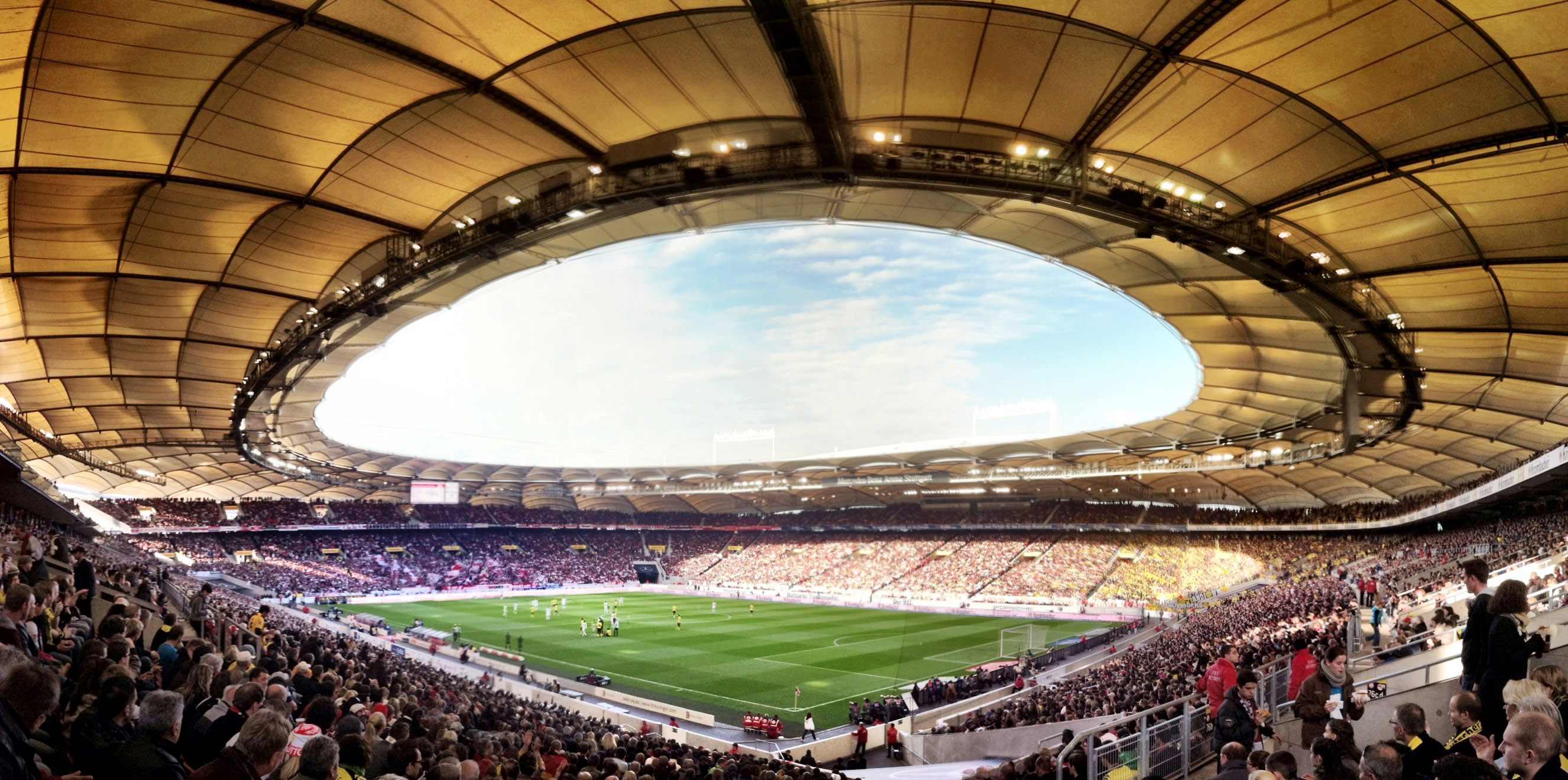
A panorama view of Stuttgart against Borussia Dortmund in October 2011

== International matches ==
The Neckarstadion hosted four matches of the 1974 FIFA World Cup, two matches of the 1988 UEFA European Football Championship (a 1st Round match and a semi-final) and six games of the 2006 FIFA World Cup, including a Round of 16 game and the third-place playoff match (see below for details).

The stadium also hosted the finals of the European Cup (now known as UEFA Champions League) in 1959 (Real Madrid vs. Stade de Reims) and 1988 (PSV Eindhoven vs. S.L. Benfica).

== Trivia ==
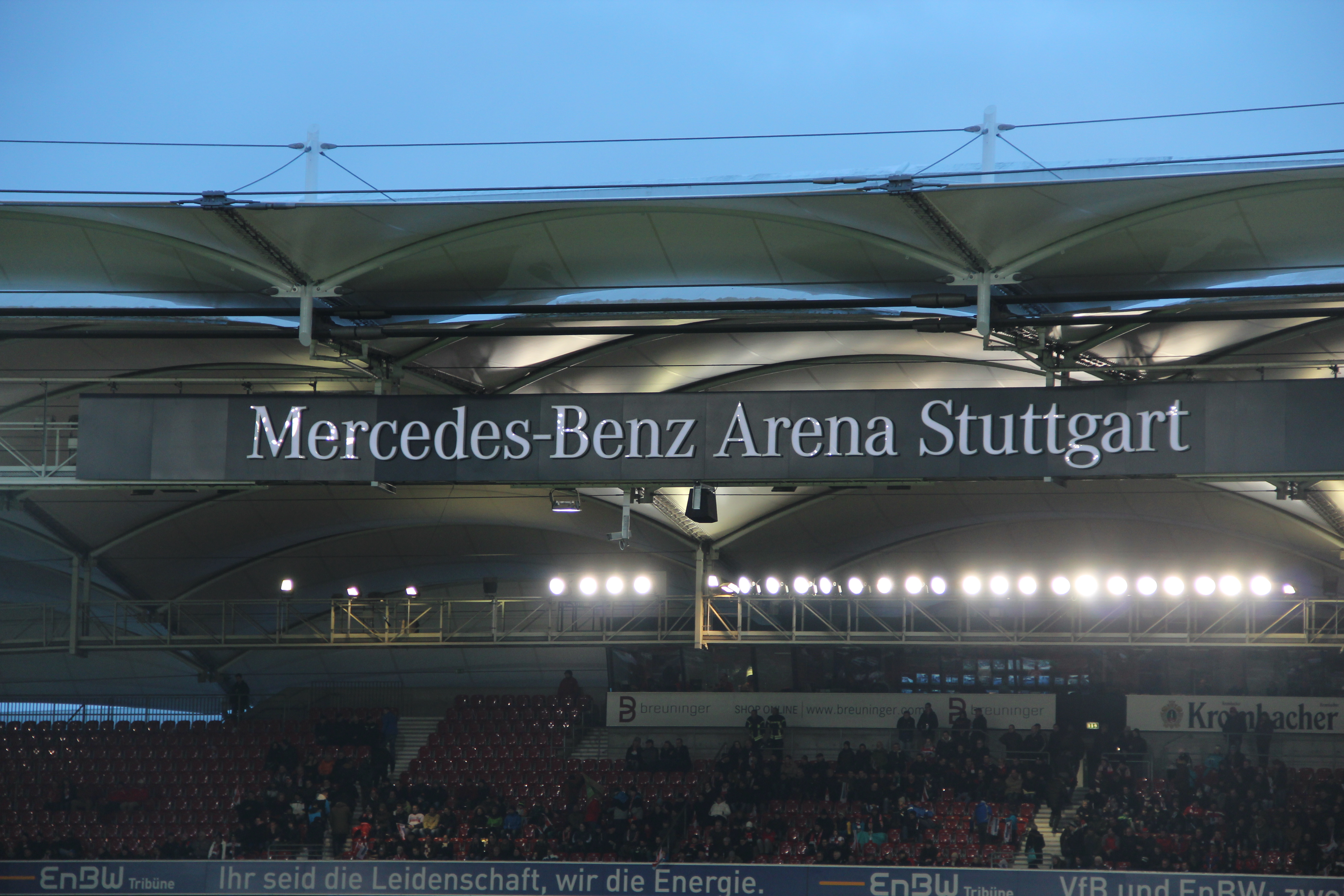
Former Name logo of Mercedes-Benz-Arena

- Germany's first international football match after World War II in 1950 (against Switzerland) was played at the stadium. The official match attendance of 96,400 is the stadium record. Journalists estimated that more than 100,000 people attended the match. The first match with players from West and East Germany after the German reunification in 1990 (also versus Switzerland) took place at the Neckarstadion as well.
- Klaus Fischer scored Germany's "ARD Goal of the Century" here against the Swiss in 1977, with a bicycle kick ("Fallrückzieher").
- With 115 m^{2} each, the stadium's two video walls before rebuilding were the largest in Europe.
- The Gottlieb-Daimler-Stadion was one of the four stadiums hosting games during the 2006 FIFA World Cup whose name were not changed to FIFA World Cup Stadium XYZ, as the dedication to Gottlieb Daimler was not interpreted as advertisement (i.e. for DaimlerChrysler). All others, such as the Allianz Arena in Munich or the AOL Arena in Hamburg were obliged to remove all visual references to their stadiums' name sponsors.

== Sports other than football ==
The 1986 European Athletics Championships in which the hammer throw world record by Yuriy Sedykh was set, and the 1993 World Athletics Championships were held in the stadium. The stadium was the host of the IAAF World Athletics final from 2006 to 2008, after which the stadium underwent redevelopment in order to build a football-only arena. The arena has also been the venue of four Eurobowl finals of American football from 1994 to 1997.

== Renovations and redevelopment into football-specific stadium ==
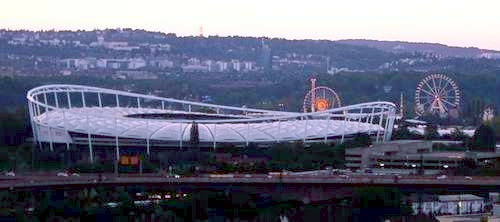
Gottlieb-Daimler-Stadion with the Cannstatter Volksfest in the background, 2002

In 1993 the fabric roof of the stadium was constructed. From 1999 to 2003, the upper tier of the main stand was demolished and rebuilt. In 2005, the opposite stand received a new upper tier as well.

The redevelopment into a football-specific stadium was announced along with the stadium's name change in late March 2008. The first computer images of the new arena were released at the same time, also showing a large cube with four video scoreboards above the centre circle, similar to the one in the Commerzbank-Arena in Frankfurt.

Starting in 2009, the Mercedes-Benz Arena has been redeveloped into a football-specific stadium. New stands were constructed, after the running track was demolished and the pitch level was lowered by 1.30 metres in time for the beginning of the 2009–10 season. Both curves were completely demolished and rebuilt closer to the pitch during the next two years. After the interior redevelopment finished, the roof was expanded to cover all the new rows of the seats. The entire construction was completed by the end of 2011.

Within the first couple of weeks of the redevelopment, 18 undetonated bombs left over from the air raids on Stuttgart during the Second World War were found on the construction site.

During the 2017 summer break, the stadium roof was replaced at a cost of €9.75 million, as the membrane that had covered the stadium since the 1993 World Athletics Championships had reached the end of its service life after 24 years. From 2022 to 2024, various construction measures were carried out in the run-up to the UEFA Euro 2024. The lower level of the main stand, which dates back to 1974, was completely rebuilt and the main stand was extended up to the roof supports. This resulted in new team cabins, sports function rooms, a new media centre, another business area and a modern production kitchen. The planned construction costs originally totalled around €98.5 million. However, they rose to €139.5 million over the course of the project. The conversion was completed at the end of March 2024.

== International tournaments matches ==
All times local (CET)

=== 1974 FIFA World Cup ===
Stuttgart hosted the following matches at the 1974 FIFA World Cup:

Date	Time (CET)	Team #1	Res.	Team #2	Round	Attendance
15 June 1974	18:00	Poland	3–2	Argentina	Group 4	32,700
19 June 1974	19:30	Argentina	1–1	Italy	Group 4	70,100
23 June 1974	16:00	Poland	2–1	Italy	Group 4	70,100
26 June 1974	19:30	Sweden	0–1	Poland	Group B	44,955

=== UEFA Euro 1988 ===
These UEFA Euro 1988 matches were played in Stuttgart:

Date	Time (CET)	Team #1	Res.	Team #2	Round	Attendance
12 June 1988	15:30	England	0–1	Republic of Ireland	Group 2	51,373
22 June 1988	20:15	Soviet Union	2–0	Italy	Semi-finals	61,606

=== 2006 FIFA World Cup ===
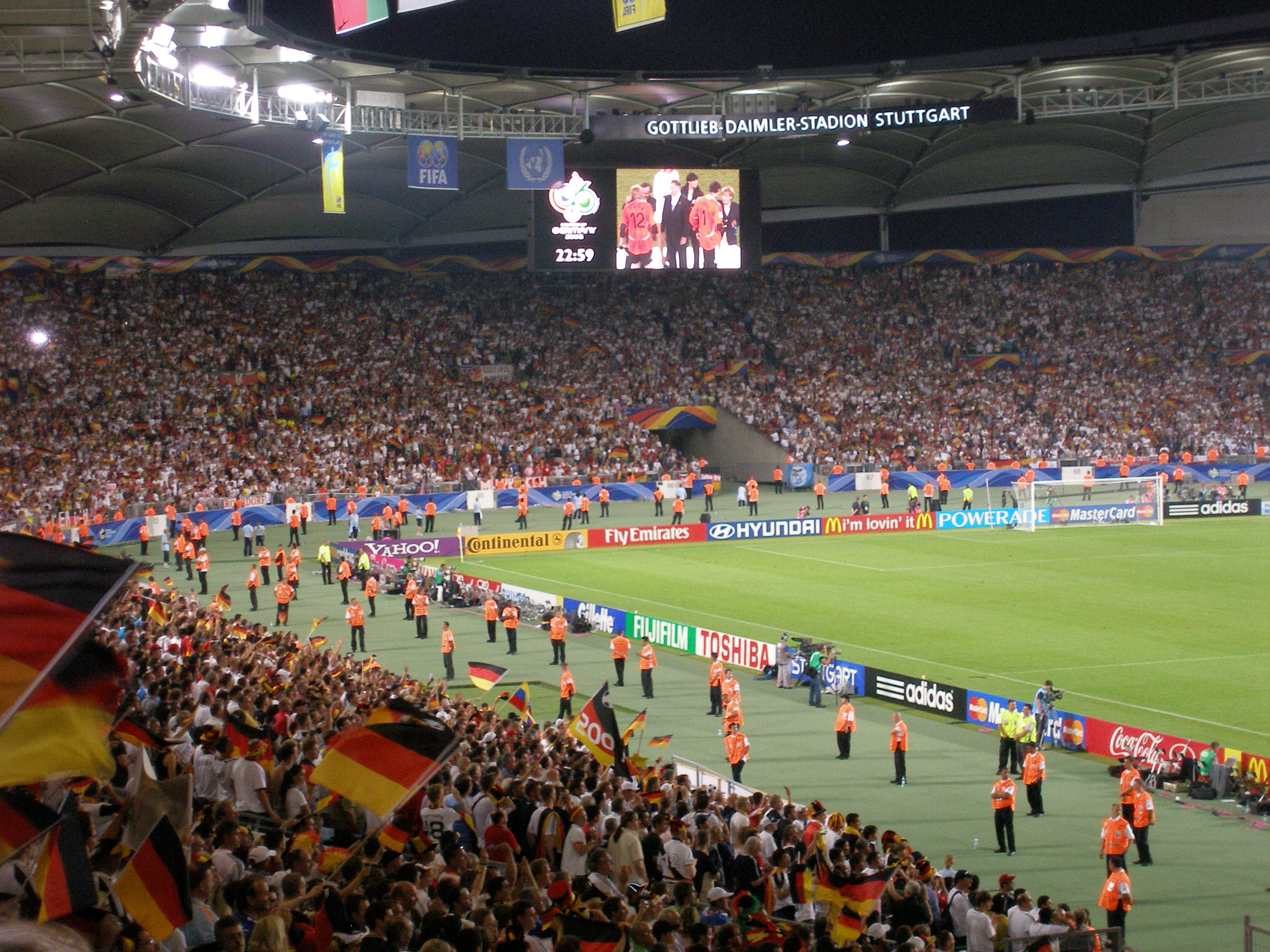
Gottlieb-Daimler-Stadion during the third place play-off of the 2006 FIFA World Cup

The following games were played at the stadium during the 2006 FIFA World Cup:

Date	Time (CET)	Team #1	Res.	Team #2	Round	Attendance
13 June 2006	18:00	France	0–0	Switzerland	Group G	52,000
16 June 2006	18:00	Netherlands	2–1	Ivory Coast	Group C	52,000
19 June 2006	21:00	Spain	3–1	Tunisia	Group H	52,000
22 June 2006	21:00	Croatia	2–2	Australia	Group F	52,000
25 June 2006	17:00	England	1–0	Ecuador	Round of 16	52,000
8 July 2006	21:00	Germany	3–1	Portugal	Third place match	52,000

=== UEFA Euro 2024 ===
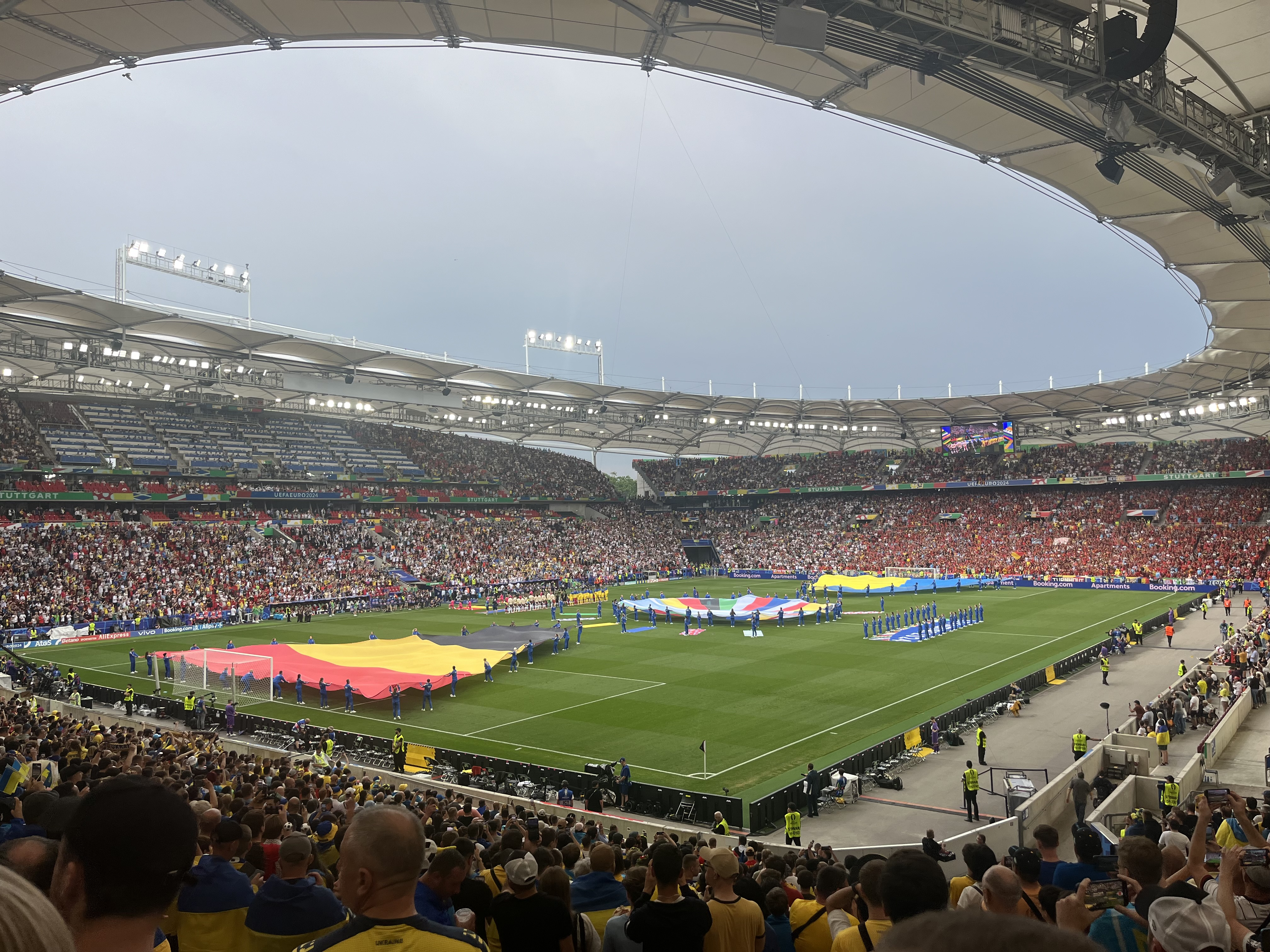
The MHP Arena and the renovated main stand of the stadium during a group match between Ukraine and Belgium of the 2024 European Championship

The stadium hosted four group stage matches and one quarter-final match at the UEFA Euro 2024:

Date	Time (CET)	Team #1	Res.	Team #2	Round	Attendance
16 June 2024	18:00	Slovenia	1–1	Denmark	Group C	54,000
19 June 2024	18:00	Germany	2–0	Hungary	Group A	54,000
23 June 2024	21:00	Scotland	0–1	Hungary	Group A	54,000
26 June 2024	18:00	Ukraine	0–0	Belgium	Group E	54,000
5 July 2024	18:00	Spain	2–1 (a.e.t.)	Germany	Quarter-finals	54,000

=== 2025 UEFA Nations League Finals ===
Date	Time (CET)	Team #1	Result	Team #2	Round	Attendance
5 June 2025	21:00	Spain	5–4	France	Semi-Finals	51,724
8 June 2025	15:00	Germany	0–2	France	Third Place	51,313

=== UEFA Club Competition Finals ===
Date	Winners	Result	Runners-up	Round	Attendance
3 June 1959	(Spain) Real Madrid	2–0	(France) Reims	1959 European Cup final	72,000
5 September 1962	(Spain) Atlético Madrid	3–0	(Italy) Fiorentina	1962 European Cup Winners' Cup final (Replay)	38,120
25 May 1988	(Netherlands) PSV Eindhoven	0–0 (6–5 p)	(Portugal) Benfica	1988 European Cup final	64,000

== Concerts ==
Pink Floyd performed at the stadium on 25 June 1989 as part of their 1989 Another Lapse European Tour (A Momentary Lapse of Reason Tour).

English rock band Genesis continued their Turn It On Again: The Tour at the stadium in a sold-out crowd of 50,736 fans in attendance.

Depeche Mode performed at the stadium on 3 June 2013 during their Delta Machine Tour, in front of a sold-out crowd of about 36,000 people.

== See also ==
- List of football stadiums in Germany
- Lists of stadiums

Preceded by Heysel Stadium; Brussels	European Cup; Final venue 1959	Succeeded by Hampden Park; Glasgow
Preceded by Praterstadion; Vienna	European Cup; Final venue 1988	Succeeded by Camp Nou; Barcelona
Preceded by National Stadium; Tokyo	IAAF World Championships in Athletics; Main venue 1993	Succeeded by Ullevi; Gothenburg
Preceded by De Kuip; De Grolsch Veste	UEFA Nations League; Finals venue 2025 with Allianz Arena	Succeeded by To be determined
