= Andrzej Szarmach =

Polish footballer

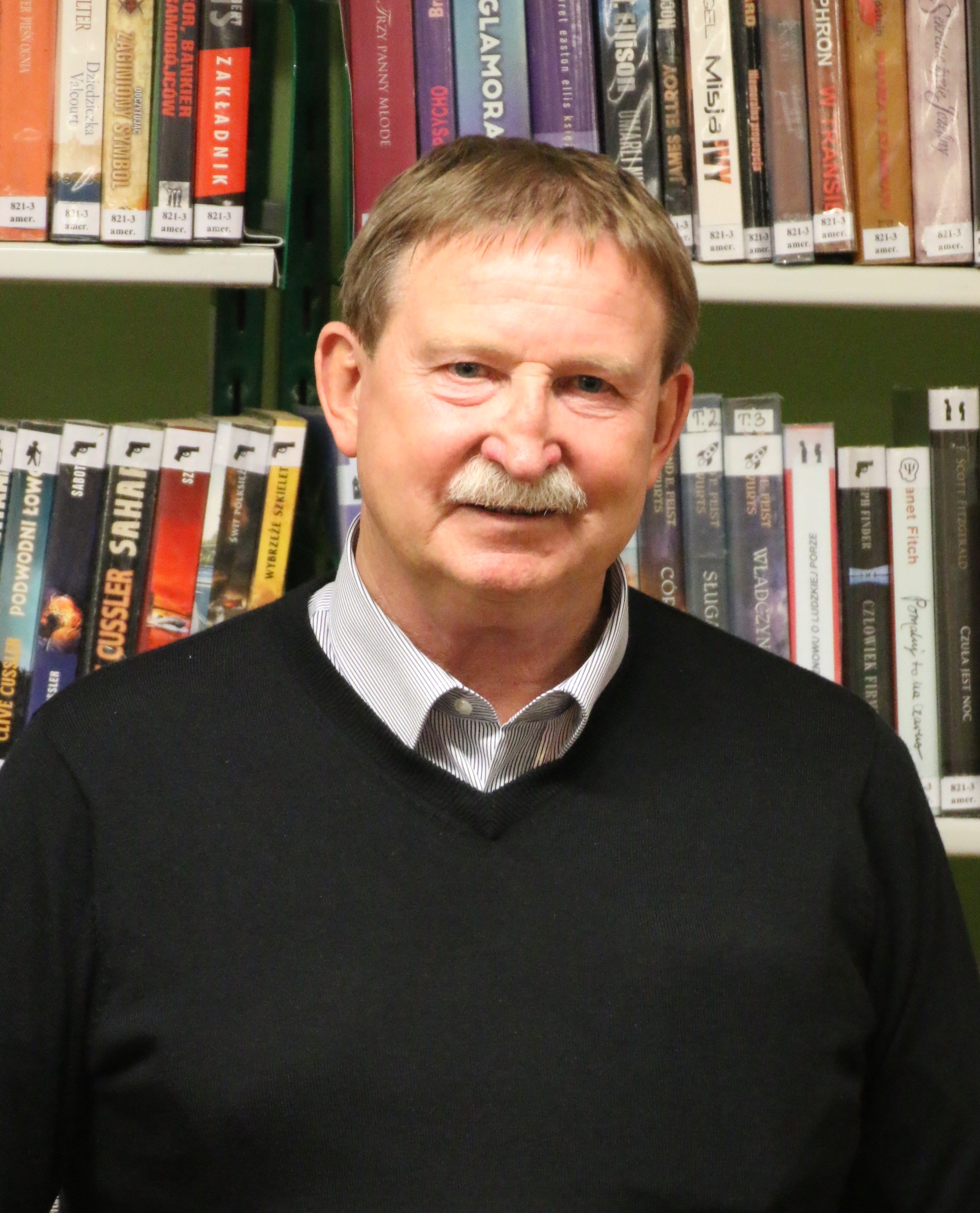
- Szarmach in October 2017

Personal information
- Date of birth: 3 October 1950 (age 76)
- Place of birth: Gdańsk, Poland
- Height: 1.78 m (5 ft 10 in)
- Position: Striker

Senior career*
Years	Team	Apps	(Gls)
1967–1969	Polonia Gdańsk	19	(10)
1969–1971	Stoczniowiec Gdańsk	26	(14)
1969–1972	Arka Gdynia	21	(15)
1972–1976	Górnik Zabrze	105	(49)
1976–1980	Stal Mielec	109	(60)
1980–1985	Auxerre	148	(94)
1985–1987	En Avant Guingamp	64	(33)
1987–1989	Clermont Foot	32	(20)
Total		517	(295)

International career
1973–1982	Poland	61	(32)

Managerial career
- 1987–1989: Clermont Foot
- 1989–1991: Châteauroux
- 1991–1995: Angoulême
- 1997–1998: Zagłębie Lubin
- 1999–2001: Aurillac
Medal record
Men's football
Representing Poland
FIFA World Cup
Third place	1974 West Germany
Third place	1982 Spain
Olympic Games
Silver medal – second place	1976 Montreal	Team
- * Club domestic league appearances and goals

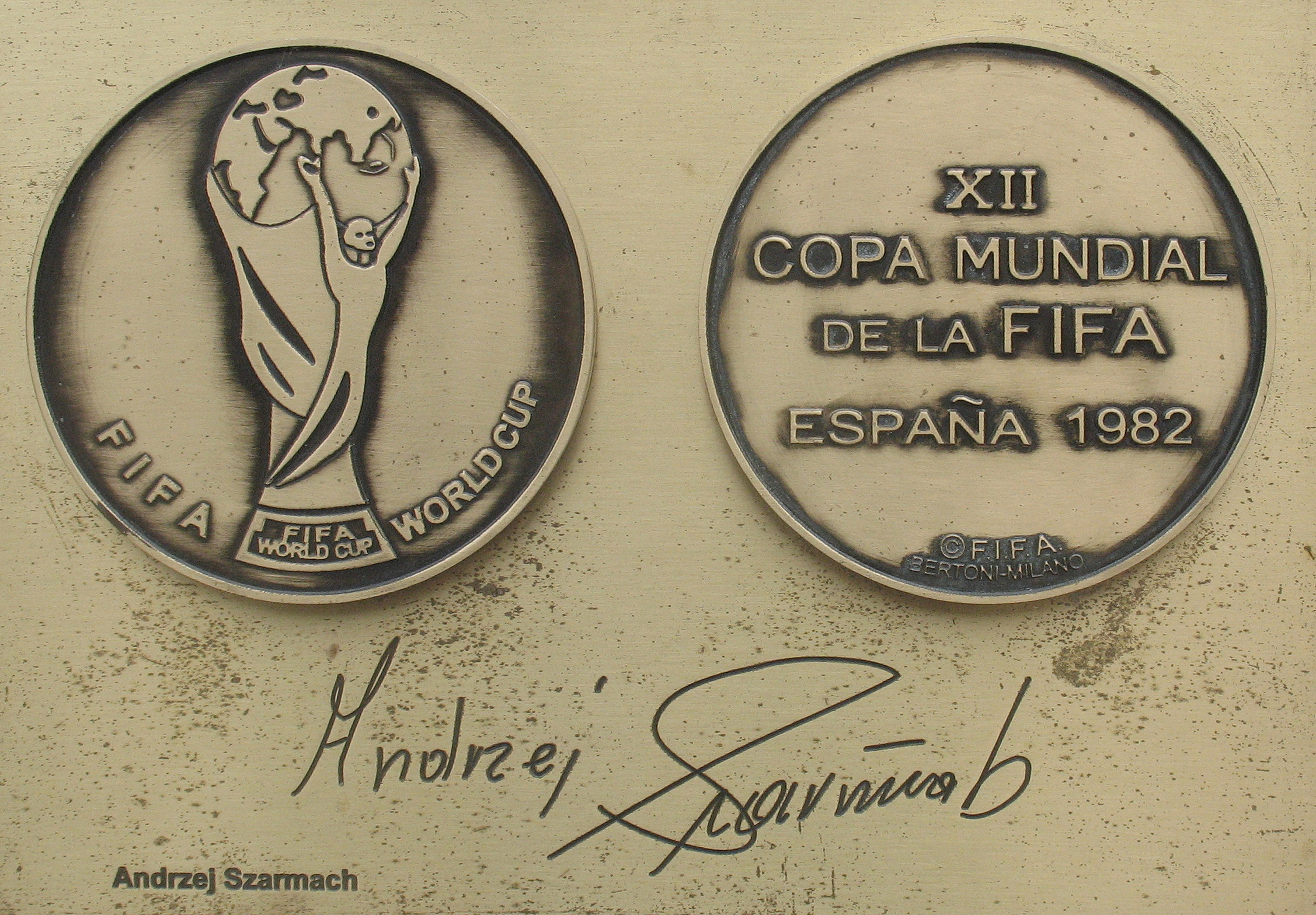
Copy of A. Szarmach medal and autograph in Aleja Gwiazd Sportu w Dziwnowie

Andrzej Szarmach (Polish pronunciation: [ˈandʐɛj ˈʂarmax]; born 3 October 1950) is a Polish former professional footballer who played as a striker.

Prior to the 1974 FIFA World Cup, he was virtually unknown. He played in the Poland national team during its "golden age" in the 1970s. With Grzegorz Lato at his right, Robert Gadocha at his left, and Kazimierz Deyna in support, Szarmach profited from the absence of Włodzimierz Lubański to lead the Polish attack, the best at 1974 World Cup, with sixteen goals. While Lato finished first in the Cup in goals with seven, Szarmach, with five goals, also marked the competition with his imprint. He confirmed his status two years later at the 1976 Olympics in Montreal, winning the silver medal and the title of best player of the tournament, with nine goals.

Jowled and moustached, the Polish attacker had a Gallic quality and thus easily fit in at AJ Auxerre. He won the favour of Guy Roux and of the Burgundian public, by scoring 94 goals between 1980 and 1985. After a brief period at Guingamp and a total of 32 goals in 61 games with the Poland national team, Szarmach began his career as a manager, in particular managing Clermont-Ferrand, then Châteauroux in the second division.

Scores and results list Poland's goal tally first, score column indicates score after each Szarmach goal.

List of international goals scored by Andrzej Szarmach
No.	Date	Venue	Opponent	Score	Result	Competition	Ref.
1	10 August 1973	Kezar Stadium, San Francisco, United States of America	United States	3–0	4–0	Friendly	
2	13 April 1974	Stade Sylvio Cator, Port-au-Prince, Haiti	Haiti	1–2	1–2	Friendly	
3	15 April 1974	Stade Sylvio Cator, Port-au-Prince, Haiti	Haiti	1–0	3–1	Friendly	
4	15 April 1974	Stade Sylvio Cator, Port-au-Prince, Haiti	Haiti	3–0	3–1	Friendly	
5	15 June 1974	Neckarstadion, Stuttgart, Germany	Argentina	2–0	3–2	1974 FIFA World Cup	
6	19 June 1974	Olympiastadion, Munich, Germany	Haiti	3–0	7–0	1974 FIFA World Cup	
7	19 June 1974	Olympiastadion, Munich, Germany	Haiti	5–0	7–0	1974 FIFA World Cup	
8	19 June 1974	Olympiastadion, Munich, Germany	Haiti	6–0	7–0	1974 FIFA World Cup	
9	23 June 1974	Neckarstadion, Stuttgart, Germany	Italy	1–0	2–1	1974 FIFA World Cup	
10	1 September 1974	Olympic Stadium, Helsinki, Finland	Finland	1–1	2–1	UEFA Euro 1976 qualifying	
11	13 November 1974	Letná Stadium, Prague, Czechoslovakia	Czechoslovakia	2–0	2–2	Friendly	
12	26 March 1975	Stadion im. 22 lipca, Poznań, Poland	United States	2–0	7–0	Friendly	
13	26 March 1975	Stadion im. 22 lipca, Poznań, Poland	United States	4–0	7–0	Friendly	
14	24 June 1975	Memorial Stadium, Seattle, United States of America	United States	3–0	4–0	Friendly	
15	6 July 1975	Olympic Stadium, Montreal, Canada	Canada	7–1	8–1	Friendly	
16	9 July 1975	Varsity Stadium, Toronto, Canada	Canada	2–0	4–1	Friendly	
17	9 July 1975	Varsity Stadium, Toronto, Canada	Canada	3–0	4–1	Friendly	
18	10 September 1975	Stadion Śląski, Chorzów, Poland	Netherlands	3–0	4–1	UEFA Euro 1976 qualifying	
19	10 September 1975	Stadion Śląski, Chorzów, Poland	Netherlands	4–0	4–1	UEFA Euro 1976 qualifying	
20	22 July 1976	Olympic Stadium, Montreal, Canada	Iran	1–1	3–2	1976 Summer Olympics	
21	22 July 1976	Olympic Stadium, Montreal, Canada	Iran	3–1	3–2	1976 Summer Olympics	
22	25 July 1976	Olympic Stadium, Montreal, Canada	North Korea	1–0	5–0	1976 Summer Olympics	
23	25 July 1976	Olympic Stadium, Montreal, Canada	North Korea	2–0	5–0	1976 Summer Olympics	
24	31 October 1976	Stadion Dziesięciolecia, Warsaw, Poland	Cyprus	2–0	5–0	1978 FIFA World Cup qualification	
25	10 June 1977	Estadio Nacional, Lima, Peru	Peru	1-0	3-1	Friendly	
26	21 September 1977	Stadion Śląski, Chorzów, Poland	Denmark	4–1	4–1	1978 FIFA World Cup qualification	
27	22 March 1978	Stade Municipal, Luxembourg City, Luxembourg	Luxembourg	2–0	3–1	Friendly	
28	22 March 1978	Stade Municipal, Luxembourg City, Luxembourg	Luxembourg	3–0	3–1	Friendly	
29	18 June 1978	Estadio Ciudad de Mendoza, Mendoza, Argentina	Peru	1–0	1–0	1978 FIFA World Cup	
30	19 April 1980	Stadio Comunale, Turin, Italy	Italy	2–2	2–2	Friendly	
31	10 October 1981	Zentralstadion, Leipzig, Germany	East Germany	1–0	3–2	1982 FIFA World Cup qualification	
32	10 July 1982	Estadio José Rico Pérez, Alicante, Spain	France	1–1	3–2	1982 FIFA World Cup	

== Honours ==
Poland

- Olympic silver medal: 1976
- FIFA World Cup third place: 1974, 1982

Individual

- Olympic top scorer: 1976
- French Division 1 Foreign Player of the Year: 1981, 1982

== See also ==
- List of FIFA World Cup top goalscorers
