= Emmanuel Sanon =

Haitian footballer (1951–2008)

Manno Sanon
Personal information
- Full name: Emmanuel Sanon
- Date of birth: 25 June 1951
- Place of birth: Port-au-Prince, Haiti
- Date of death: 21 February 2008 (aged 56)
- Place of death: Orlando, Florida, United States
- Height: 1.78 m (5 ft 10 in)
- Position: Striker

Senior career*
Years	Team	Apps	(Gls)
1971–1974	Don Bosco FC		
1974–1980	Beerschot	142	(43)
1980	Miami Americans		
1980–1983	San Diego Sockers	31	(16)
1981–1982	San Diego Sockers (indoor)	16	(8)

International career
1970–1981	Haiti	65	(37)

Managerial career
- 1999–2000: Haiti
- * Club domestic league appearances and goals

Emmanuel "Manno" Sanon (25 June 1951 – 21 February 2008) was a Haitian professional footballer who played as a striker. He starred in the Haiti national team winning the 1973 CONCACAF Championship. Haiti qualified for the finals of the 1974 FIFA World Cup. Though they lost all three matches Sanon scored twice in the tournament. His goal against Italy when he ran onto a pass from Philippe Vorbe was the first conceded by Italian goalkeeper Dino Zoff in 1,142 minutes of football.

Sanon won his home national championship in 1971 with top-level Don Bosco. He then won the Belgian Cup in the Belgian Pro League in 1979 with the K. Beerschot V.A.C.

Sanon is among the "Les 100 Héros de la Coupe du Monde" (100 Heroes of the World Cup), which included the top 100 World Cup Players from 1930 to 1990, a list drawn up in 1994 by the France Football magazine based exclusively on their performances at World Cup level.

== Early life ==
Sanon attended the Lycée de Pétion-Ville Secondary School.

== Club career ==
Sanon spent four season with his home club Don Bosco, where he won the national championship in 1971. He then spent six seasons for the K. Beerschot V.A.C., where he won the Belgian Cup in 1979 with a decisive assist to Johan Coninx for the only goal scored. He would finish his tenure in the Belgian Pro League, with 142 matches and 43 goals.

In 1980, Sanon signed with the Miami Americans of the second division American Soccer League. When head coach Ron Newman left the team on 20 June 1980 to become the head coach of the San Diego Sockers of the first division North American Soccer League, he induced Sanon to also move to the Sockers. Sanon spent three seasons with the Sockers until he suffered a career ending knee injury.

== International career ==
Sanon earned 65 caps and 37 goals for the Haiti national football team.

In 1972, Sanon was one of seven Haitian national team players selected to represent CONCACAF in the Brazil Independence Cup, a competition that featured many World Cup caliber teams.

=== 1974 FIFA World Cup ===
Having qualified by first knocking out Puerto Rico in a play-off, then topping the final group in the capital Port-au-Prince, Haiti was drawn into a very difficult group featuring two-time champions Italy, future champions Argentina, and Poland, golden medal in the 1972 Summer Olympics and who managed third place in the tournament. While they predictably finished last in the group with three losses and a -12 goal difference, Emmanuel Sanon scored both goals for the country in the tournament. He scored against Argentina in the last game of the group, but by far the most famous goal occurred against Italy. The Azzurri had not let in a goal in 19 games prior to the World Cup, thanks to goalkeeper Dino Zoff. In the opening of the second half, Sanon shocked the Italians with the opening goal. However this lead did not hold and Italy went on to win 3–1. By the time Haiti was tossed from the tournament after losing 7–0 to Poland and 4–1 to Argentina, Sanon had nonetheless cemented his place in footballing history.

== Coaching career ==
Sanon coached the Haiti national team for a year from 1999 to 2000, during which he led his team to the 2000 CONCACAF Gold Cup.

== Death ==
On 21 February 2008, Emmanuel Sanon died in Orlando, Florida, of pancreatic cancer, aged 56, having received the highest State funeral in the Haitian history and buried in the capital Port-au-Prince. The Haitian Legislature voted to award a perpetual exempted pension to his family posthumously as an honorific gesture for scoring the goals in Haiti's 1974 FIFA World Cup participation.

== Career statistics ==
This list is not completed yet

Scores and results list Haiti's goal tally first, score column indicates score after each Sanon goal.

List of international goals scored by Emmanuel Sanon
No.	Date	Venue	Opponent	Score	Result	Competition
1	14 April 1970	Stade Sylvio Cator, Port-au-Prince, Haiti	Bermuda		1–1	Friendly
2	31 October 1971	Stade Louis Achille, Fort-de-France, Martinique	Martinique		2–2	Friendly
3	28 November 1971	Queen's Park Oval, Port of Spain, Trinidad and Tobago	Trinidad and Tobago		6–1	1971 CONCACAF Championship
4	1 December 1971	Queen's Park Oval, Port of Spain, Trinidad and Tobago	Honduras		3–1	1971 CONCACAF Championship
5	13 February 1972	Basseterre, Saint Kitts and Nevis	Guadeloupe		4–4	Friendly
6	15 April 1972	Stade Sylvio Cator, Port-au-Prince, Haiti	Puerto Rico		7–0	1973 CONCACAF Championship qualification
7	15 April 1972	Stade Sylvio Cator, Port-au-Prince, Haiti	Puerto Rico		7–0	1973 CONCACAF Championship qualification
8	15 April 1972	Stade Sylvio Cator, Port-au-Prince, Haiti	Puerto Rico		7–0	1973 CONCACAF Championship qualification
9	23 April 1972	San Juan, Puerto Rico	Puerto Rico		5–0	1973 CONCACAF Championship qualification
10	23 April 1972	San Juan, Puerto Rico	Puerto Rico		5–0	1973 CONCACAF Championship qualification
11	23 April 1972	San Juan, Puerto Rico	Puerto Rico		5–0	1973 CONCACAF Championship qualification
12	14 December 1972	Stade Sylvio Cator, Port-au-Prince, Haiti	Netherlands Antilles	1–0	3–0	Friendly
13	14 December 1972	Stade Sylvio Cator, Port-au-Prince, Haiti	Netherlands Antilles	2–0	3–0	Friendly
14	14 December 1972	Stade Sylvio Cator, Port-au-Prince, Haiti	Netherlands Antilles	3–0	3–0	Friendly
15	17 December 1972	Stade Sylvio Cator, Port-au-Prince, Haiti	Netherlands Antilles		4–1	Friendly
16	30 January 1973	Bourda, Georgetown, Guyana	Guyana		3–1	Friendly
17	6 February 1973	Kensington Oval, Bridgetown, Barbados	Barbados		2–3	Friendly
18	8 February 1973	Queen's Park Oval, Port of Spain, Trinidad and Tobago	Trinidad and Tobago		4–2	Friendly
19	5 November 1973	Stade Sylvio Cator, Port-au-Prince, Haiti	United States	1–0	1–0	Friendly
20	10 November 1973	Stade Sylvio Cator, Port-au-Prince, Haiti	Canada		5–1	Friendly
21	10 November 1973	Stade Sylvio Cator, Port-au-Prince, Haiti	Canada		5–1	Friendly
22	10 November 1973	Stade Sylvio Cator, Port-au-Prince, Haiti	Canada		5–1	Friendly
23	1 December 1973	Stade Sylvio Cator, Port-au-Prince, Haiti	Netherlands Antilles		3–0	1973 CONCACAF Championship
24	1 December 1973	Stade Sylvio Cator, Port-au-Prince, Haiti	Netherlands Antilles		3–0	1973 CONCACAF Championship
25	4 December 1973	Stade Sylvio Cator, Port-au-Prince, Haiti	Trinidad and Tobago		2–1	1973 CONCACAF Championship
26	13 December 1973	Stade Sylvio Cator, Port-au-Prince, Haiti	Guatemala		2–1	1973 CONCACAF Championship
27	13 December 1973	Stade Sylvio Cator, Port-au-Prince, Haiti	Guatemala		2–1	1973 CONCACAF Championship
28	13 November 1974	Olympic Stadium, Munich, West Germany	Poland		0–7	1974 FIFA World Cup
29	15 June 1974	Olympic Stadium, Munich, West Germany	Italy	1–0	1–3	1974 FIFA World Cup
30	23 June 1974	Olympic Stadium, Munich, West Germany	Argentina	1–3	1–4	1974 FIFA World Cup
31	30 July 1976	National Stadium, Oranjestad, Netherlands Antilles	Netherlands Antilles		2–1	1977 CONCACAF Championship qualification
32	30 July 1976	National Stadium, Oranjestad, Netherlands Antilles	Netherlands Antilles		2–1	1977 CONCACAF Championship qualification
33	14 August 1976	Stade Sylvio Cator, Port-au-Prince, Haiti	Netherlands Antilles		7–0	1977 CONCACAF Championship qualification
34	14 August 1976	Stade Sylvio Cator, Port-au-Prince, Haiti	Netherlands Antilles		7–0	1977 CONCACAF Championship qualification
35	28 November 1976	Estadio Pedro Marrero, Havana, Cuba	Cuba		1–1	1977 CONCACAF Championship qualification
36	11 December 1976	Stade Sylvio Cator, Port-au-Prince, Haiti	Cuba		1–1	1977 CONCACAF Championship qualification
37	16 October 1977	Estadio Azteca, Mexico City, Mexico	El Salvador	1–0	1–0	1977 CONCACAF Championship

== Honours ==
Don Bosco

- Ligue Haïtienne: 1971

Beerschot

- Belgian Cup: 1978–79
- Belgian Super Cup runner-up: 1979

San Diego Sockers

- NASL Indoor season: 1981–82

Haiti

- CONCACAF Championship: 1973; runner-up 1971, 1977

Individual

- RSSSF CONCACAF Championship Team of The Tournament: 1971
- Selected to represent CONCACAF at Brazil Independence Cup: 1972.
- France Football: FIFA World Cup Top-100 1930–1990
- Haitian Athlete of the Century (1999)

Orders

- National Order of Honour and Merit: Commander (2007)
