= Ernst Jean-Joseph =

Haitian footballer (1948–2020)

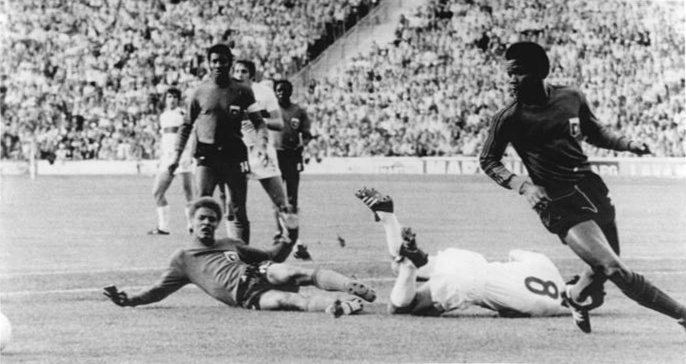
- Jean-Joseph (on the ground, left) versus Italy

Personal information
- Date of birth: 11 June 1948
- Place of birth: Cap-Haïtien, Haiti
- Date of death: 14 August 2020 (aged 72)
- Position: Center back

Senior career*
Years	Team	Apps	(Gls)
1969–1977	Violette A.C.		
1976	Ottawa Tigers		
1978	Chicago Sting	9	(0)
1978–	Violette A.C.		

International career
1972–1980	Haiti		

Managerial career
- 1984: Violette A.C.
- * Club domestic league appearances and goals

Ernst Jean-Joseph (11 June 1948 – 14 August 2020) was a Haitian football midfielder who played for Haiti in the 1974 FIFA World Cup. He played for Violette A.C. and briefly for Chicago Sting. In the summer of 1976, he played in the National Soccer League with Ottawa Tigers.

Described as a "red-haired mulatto" by Brian Glanville, Jean-Joseph failed a doping test after Haiti's opening match with Italy in 1974. After first contending that he had received a “lot of pills” from his physician in Haiti for treatment of asthma (and being contradicted by the team doctor, who told the media he had no such ailment), he admitted that he had used a stimulant containing phenmetrazine to improve his performance. Jean-Joseph was the first player to be suspended for using a banned substance in the history of the World Cup.

The vice-president of the Haitian FA, Major Acedius St. Louis, was also the commander of the Leopards, a notorious elite battalion of the Haitian army under Jean-Claude Duvalier’s personal command. Haitian officials dragged Jean-Joseph out of the Grünwald Sports School in Munich where the team had been staying, beat him, and held him over night at the Sheraton Hotel and flew him back to Haiti. The terrified Jean-Joseph had made several phone calls to a sympathetic hostess who passed on the information to the designated team attaché, Kurt Renner. The World Cup organizing committee, furious at Renner for telling the story to the media, removed him from his post.

Jean-Joseph's World Cup experience was not the end of his international career. Jean-Joseph played in seven 1978 World Cup qualifiers and one 1982 World Cup qualifier, a 1–0 win over Netherlands Antilles on 12 September 1980 in Port-au-Prince.

Jean-Joseph later became manager of Violette A.C.
