= Jean-Claude Désir =

Haitian footballer (born 1946)

Personal information
- Date of birth: 8 August 1946 (age 80)
- Place of birth: Port-au-Prince, Ouest, Haiti
- Position: Midfielder

Senior career*
Years	Team	Apps	(Gls)
1965-1977	Aigle Noir		
1966	→ Racing Haïtien (loan)		
1968	→ Detroit Cougars (loan)	11	(1)

International career
1965-1977	Haiti	40	(10)
- * Club domestic league appearances and goals

Jean-Claude Désir (born 8 August 1946) is a former Haitian football midfielder who played for Haiti in the 1974 FIFA World Cup. He played for Aigle Noir AC as well as Detroit Cougars of the NASL.
