= Serge Ducosté =

Haitian footballer (1944–2024)

Personal information
- Date of birth: 4 February 1944
- Place of birth: Port-au-Prince, Haiti
- Date of death: 5 July 2024 (aged 80)
- Position: Defender

Senior career*
Years	Team	Apps	(Gls)
1965–1975	Aigle Noir AC		

International career
- Haiti
- * Club domestic league appearances and goals

Serge Ducosté (4 February 1944 – 5 July 2024) was a Haitian football defender who played for Haiti in the 1974 FIFA World Cup. He also played for Aigle Noir AC. He died on 5 July 2024, at the age of 80.
