= Wilfried Louis =

Haitian footballer (born 1949)

Personal information
- Date of birth: 25 October 1949 (age 77)
- Place of birth: Haiti
- Position: Defender

Senior career*
Years	Team	Apps	(Gls)
- Don Bosco FC

International career
- Haiti
- * Club domestic league appearances and goals

Wilfried Louis (born 25 October 1949) is a Haitian football defender who played for Haiti in the 1974 FIFA World Cup. He also played for Don Bosco FC.
