= Wilner Nazaire =

Haitian footballer (born 1950)

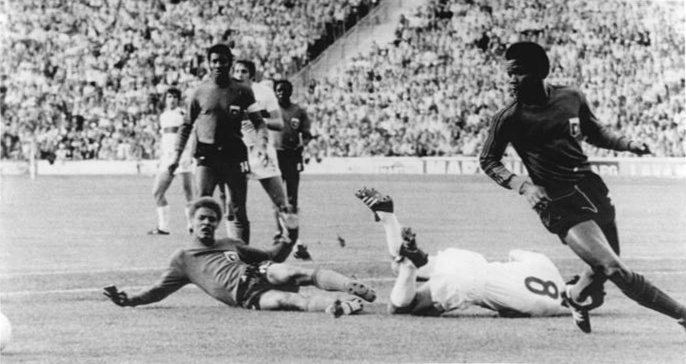
- Wilner Nazaire (#14 in the center of the image) in a match against Italy in the 1974 FIFA World Cup

Personal information
- Date of birth: 30 March 1950 (age 76)
- Place of birth: Port-au-Prince, Haiti
- Height: 1.85 m (6 ft 1 in)
- Position: Defender

Senior career*
| Years | Team | Apps | (Gls) |
| 1971–1972 | Racing Club Haïtien | 0 | (0) |
| 1972–1975 | Valenciennes | 18 | (0) |
| 1976–1977 | RC Fontainebleau | 39 | (0) |

International career
| 1972–1977 | Haiti | 13 | (0) |
- * Club domestic league appearances and goals

Wilner Nazaire (born 30 May 1950) is a Haitian former professional footballer who played as a defender. He appeared at the 1974 FIFA World Cup.
