= Fritz André =

Haitian footballer (born 1946)

Personal information
- Date of birth: 18 September 1946 (age 80)
- Place of birth: Haiti
- Position: Defender

Senior career*
Years	Team	Apps	(Gls)
- Violette A.C.

International career
- Haiti
- * Club domestic league appearances and goals

Fritz André (born 18 September 1946) is a Haitian football defender who played for Haiti in the 1974 FIFA World Cup. He also played for Violette A.C.
