= Philippe Vorbe =

Haitian footballer (born 1947)

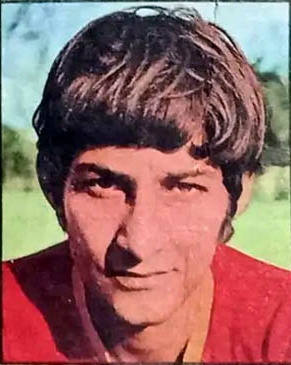
- Vorbe in 1974

Personal information
- Full name: Philippe Vorbe
- Date of birth: 14 September 1947 (age 79)
- Place of birth: Port-au-Prince, Haiti
- Height: 1.85 m (6 ft 1 in)
- Position: Midfielder

Senior career*
Years	Team	Apps	(Gls)
1967–1968	New York Generals	14	(2)
1973–1975	Violette AC		

International career
1968–1976	Haiti	18	(3)
- * Club domestic league appearances and goals

Philippe Vorbe (born 14 September 1947) is a Haitian former footballer who played as a midfielder for the Haiti national football team in the 1974 FIFA World Cup in West Germany. A legendary player in Haiti, he provided Emmanuel Sanon the pass that resulted in the famous goal that put an end to Italian goalkeeper Dino Zoff's no-goal streak. Vorbe played for the New York Generals and Violette Athletic Club. He ascended from player to leader and is now the coach of Violette.

== International career ==
Vorbe was described in a February 1974 Observer article by Hugh McIlvanney as a "tall, handsome white man of French extraction" and a "graceful midfield player" with "impressive skills".

Having qualified for the 1974 World Cup by first knocking out Puerto Rico in a play-off, then topping the final group in the capital Port-au-Prince, Haiti was drawn into a very difficult group featuring two-time champions Italy, future champions Argentina, and Poland, who managed third place in the tournament.

The most famous goal of Haiti's World Cup run occurred against Italy. The Azzurri had not let in a goal in 12 games prior to the World Cup, thanks to goalkeeper Dino Zoff. However, in the opening of the second half, Emmanuel Sanon shocked the Italians with the opening goal, thanks to a spot-on pass from teammate Philippe Vorbe. However this lead did not hold and Italy went on to win 3–1.
