= Joseph-Marion Leandré =

Haitian footballer (born 1945)

Personal information
- Date of birth: 9 May 1945 (age 81)
- Place of birth: Haiti
- Position: Midfielder

Senior career*
Years	Team	Apps	(Gls)
- Racing CH

International career
- Haiti
- * Club domestic league appearances and goals

Joseph-Marion Leandré (born 9 May 1945) is a Haitian football midfielder who played for Haiti in the 1974 FIFA World Cup. He also played for Racing CH. His younger brother, Fritz, was also a professional player.
