= Eddy Antoine =

Haitian footballer (1949–2026)

Personal information
- Date of birth: 12 August 1949
- Place of birth: Haiti
- Date of death: 8 February 2026 (aged 76)
- Position: Midfielder

Senior career*
| Years | Team | Apps | (Gls) |
| 1973–1975 | Racing CH | | |
| 1975 | New Jersey Brewers | | |
| 1978 | Chicago Sting | 6 | (1) |
| 1979 | Racing CH | | |

International career
- Haiti
- * Club domestic league appearances and goals

Eddy Antoine (27 August 1949 – 8 February 2026) was a Haitian footballer who played as a midfielder.

== Career ==
After playing for Racing CH and New Jersey Brewers, Antoine spent time in the North American Soccer League with the Chicago Sting.

Antoine represented the Haiti national team at international level, and participated at the 1974 FIFA World Cup.

== Death ==
Antoine died on 8 February 2026, at the age of 76.
