= Fritz Leandré =

Haitian footballer (born 1948)

Fritz Léandre
Personal information
- Date of birth: 13 March 1948
- Place of birth: Haiti
- Date of death: 29 October 2009
- Position: Forward

Senior career*
Years	Team	Apps	(Gls)
- Racing CH

International career
- Haiti
- * Club domestic league appearances and goals

Fritz Léandre (born 13 March 1948, death 29 October 2009) was a Haitian football forward who played for Haiti in the 1974 FIFA World Cup. He also played for Racing CH. His older brother, Joseph-Marion, was also a professional player. Leandré is deceased.
