= Serge Racine =

Haitian footballer (born 1951)

Personal information
- Date of birth: 9 October 1951 (age 75)
- Place of birth: Haiti
- Height: 1.80 m (5 ft 11 in)
- Position: Defender

Senior career*
Years	Team	Apps	(Gls)
1973–1975	Aigle Noir AC		
1975–1979	Wacker 04 Berlin	60	(4)

International career
	Haiti	2	
- * Club domestic league appearances and goals

Serge Racine (born 9 October 1951) is a Haitian football defender who played for Haiti in the 1974 FIFA World Cup. He also played for Aigle Noir AC and Wacker 04 Berlin in Germany.
