= Henri Françillon =

Haitian footballer (born 1946)

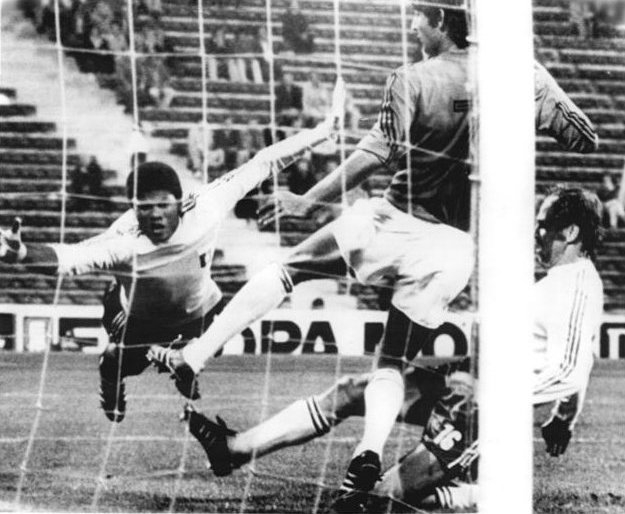
- Françillon in the 1974 FIFA World Cup match against Poland

Personal information
- Date of birth: 26 May 1946 (age 80)
- Place of birth: Port-au-Prince, Ouest, Haiti
- Height: 1.82 m (6 ft 0 in)
- Position: Goalkeeper

Senior career*
| Years | Team | Apps | (Gls) |
| 1973–1974 | Victory SC | | |
| 1974–1975 | 1860 Munich | 5 | (0) |
| 1975–1976 | Victory SC | | |
| 1976 | Ottawa Tigers | | |

International career
| 1968–1977 | Haiti | 26 | (0) |
- * Club domestic league appearances and goals

Henri Françillon (born 26 May 1946) is a Haitian former international footballer who was part of the Haitian squad at the World Cup in West Germany in 1974 where he played in all three group matches. He played as a goalkeeper. He played for the Haitian Victory SC and German TSV 1860 Munich. In 1976, he played in the National Soccer League with Ottawa Tigers.
