= Zygmunt Maszczyk =

Polish footballer (born 1945)

Personal information
- Full name: Zygmunt Paweł Maszczyk
- Date of birth: 3 May 1945 (age 81)
- Place of birth: Siemianowice Śląskie, Poland
- Height: 1.75 m (5 ft 9 in)
- Position: Midfielder

Youth career
- 1955–1962: Siemianowiczanka

Senior career*
| Years | Team | Apps | (Gls) |
| 1963–1976 | Ruch Chorzów | 310 | (41) |
| 1977–1978 | Valenciennes | 36 | (4) |
| 1979–1980 | CKS Czeladź | | |
| Total | | 346 | (45) |

International career
| 1968–1976 | Poland | 36 | (0) |
Medal record
Men's football
Representing Poland
FIFA World Cup
| Third place | 1974 West Germany |
Olympic Games
| Gold medal – first place | 1972 Munich | Team |
| Silver medal – second place | 1976 Montreal | Team |
- * Club domestic league appearances and goals

Zygmunt Paweł Maszczyk (born 3 May 1945) is a Polish former professional footballer who played as a midfielder.

He earned 36 caps with the Poland national team and was a participant at the 1974 FIFA World Cup, where Poland won the bronze medal, at the 1972 Summer Olympics, where Poland won the gold medal and at the 1976 Summer Olympics, where Poland won the silver medal. In 1975, he won the Polish Footballer of the Year plebiscite organized by the Piłka Nożna football weekly.

== Career ==
Early in his career (1955–1962), Maszczyk played in local club Siemianowiczanka Siemianowice Śląskie. He moved to the well-renowned Ruch Chorzów in 1963 and played there until 1976, appearing in 310 matches. He was instrumental in Ruch becoming three time national champion (1968, 1974, 1975) and winning the Polish Cup (1974).

During his career, Maszczyk was perhaps the most popular player of Ruch. He was well regarded for his flawless technique, exceptional work ethic, tirelessness, and quietness and aversion to media.

As an example of his style, Maszczyk was acclaimed as obviously moving the most in the field of all the players of the Poland national team that won the bronze medal at the 1974 FIFA World Cup.

Fans called him "Zyga" (a Silesian diminutive for Zygmunt).

Later, Maszczyk moved to Germany, where he left the sports career. By 1981, he lived and work in Lüdenscheid.

== Honours ==
Ruch Chorzów

- Ekstraklasa: 1967–68, 1973–74, 1974–75
- Polish Cup: 1973–74

Poland

- Olympic gold medal: 1972
- Olympic silver medal: 1976
- FIFA World Cup third place: 1974

Individual

- Piłka Nożna Polish Footballer of the Year: 1975

Orders

- Gold Cross of Merit: 1972
- Order of Polonia Restituta Officer's Cross: 1974
