= Władysław Żmuda (born 1954) =

Polish footballer (born 1954)

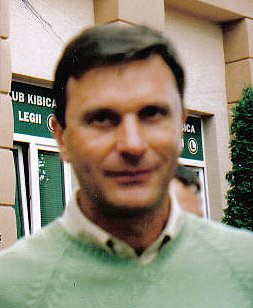
- Żmuda in 2007

Personal information
- Full name: Władysław Antoni Żmuda
- Date of birth: 6 June 1954 (age 72)
- Place of birth: Lublin, Poland
- Height: 1.87 m (6 ft 2 in)
- Position: Defender

Youth career
- 1966–1970: Motor Lublin

Senior career*
Years	Team	Apps	(Gls)
1970–1972	Motor Lublin	18	(0)
1972–1974	Gwardia Warszawa	34	(0)
1974–1980	Śląsk Wrocław	97	(0)
1980–1982	Widzew Łódź	67	(1)
1982–1984	Hellas Verona	7	(0)
1984	New York Cosmos	4	(0)
1984–1987	Cremonese	43	(1)
Total		271	(2)

International career
- Poland U18
1973–1986	Poland	91	(2)

Managerial career
- 1989–1990: Altay
- 2002–2003: Poland U20
- 2004–2005: Poland U21
- 2008–2008: Poland U16
- 2009–2010: Poland U17
- 2010–2011: Poland U19
- 2012: Poland U20
Medal record
Men's football
Representing Poland
FIFA World Cup
Third place	1974 West Germany
Third place	1982 Spain
Olympic Games
Silver medal – second place	1976 Montreal	Team
UEFA European Under-18 Championship
Third place	1972 Spain
- * Club domestic league appearances and goals

Władysław Antoni Żmuda (Polish pronunciation: [vwaˈdɨswav ˈʐmuda]; (Note: In isolation, Władysław is pronounced [vwaˈdɨswaf].) born 6 June 1954) is a Polish former professional footballer who played as a defender for Śląsk Wrocław, Widzew Łódź, Hellas Verona, New York Cosmos and US Cremonese. He earned 91 caps for the Poland national team and is a four-time FIFA World Cup participant. At the 1974 FIFA World Cup, where Poland claimed third place, he received the FIFA Young Player Award.

== Club career ==
Żmuda was born in Lublin. He spent six years learning his trade with his first club Motor Lublin before finally spreading his wings in 1973 and switching to Gwardia Warsaw, one of the Polish capital's clubs. The 19-year-old Żmuda was instrumental in Gwardia's UEFA Cup campaign of 1973–74 where they narrowly lost out to eventual winners Feyenoord. Żmuda pursued his career in Poland with Śląsk Wrocław and later Widzew Łódź before Italian club Hellas Verona secured permission to sign him from Poland in 1982. After two injury-plagued seasons at Verona, Żmuda spent a brief spell with New York Cosmos before returning to Italy with US Cremonese, playing two of his three seasons with the club in Serie B. Żmuda ended his playing career in 1988.

== International career ==
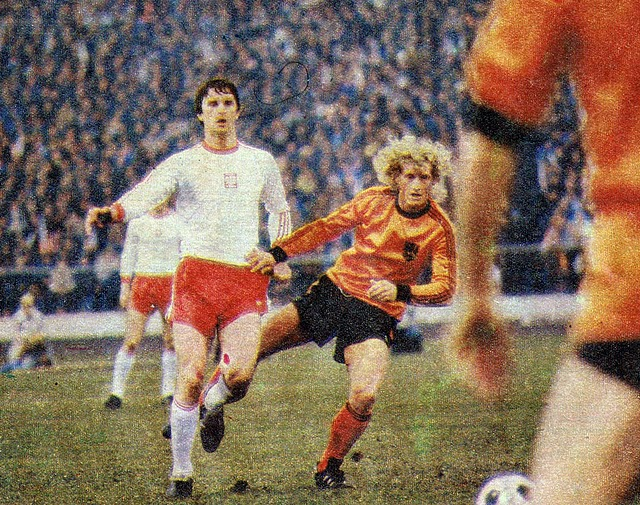
Żmuda (left) playing for Poland in a match against the Netherlands, 1979

Żmuda played for the Poland national team, for which he earned 91 caps and scored 2 goals.

He was a participant at four FIFA World Cups, the first in 1974, where Poland reached third place. He received the FIFA Young Player Award at the tournament.

He played a total of 21 matches at the World Cup finals, the sixth-most ever, tied with Uwe Seeler and Diego Maradona and behind only Lionel Messi, Lothar Matthäus, Miroslav Klose, Paolo Maldini and Cristiano Ronaldo. Being a part of Polands squad for four tournaments, in 1974, 1978, 1982 and 1986, place him joint seventh in the all-time rankings regarding players who played in the most World Cup tournaments.

He was also a participant at the 1976 Summer Olympics, where Poland won the silver medal.

== Career statistics ==
=== International ===
Appearances and goals by national team and year
National team	Year	Apps	Goals
Poland	1973	1	0
Poland	1974	9	0
Poland	1975	10	0
Poland	1976	9	0
Poland	1977	11	0
Poland	1978	12	1
Poland	1979	4	0
Poland	1980	9	0
Poland	1981	7	0
Poland	1982	7	0
Poland	1983	0	0
Poland	1984	7	0
Poland	1985	4	1
Poland	1986	1	0
Total		91	2

Scores and results list Poland's goal tally first, score column indicates score after each Żmuda goal.

List of international goals scored by Władysław Żmuda
No.	Date	Venue	Opponent	Score	Result	Competition
1	5 April 1978	Poznań, Poland	Greece	3–0	5–2	Friendly
2	17 April 1985	Opole, Poland	Finland	1–1	2–1	Friendly

== Honours ==
Śląsk Wrocław

- Ekstraklasa: 1976-77
- Polish Cup: 1975–76

Widzew Łódź

- Ekstraklasa: 1980–81, 1981–82

Poland

- Olympic silver medal: 1976
- FIFA World Cup third place: 1974, 1982

Poland U18

- UEFA European Under-18 Championship third place: 1972

Individual

- FIFA World Cup Best Young Player Award: 1974
- Polish Newcomer of the Year: 1974
- Polish Football Association National Team of the Century: 1919–2019
- Ekstraklasa Hall of Fame: 2022
