= Jan Tomaszewski =

Polish footballer (born 1948)

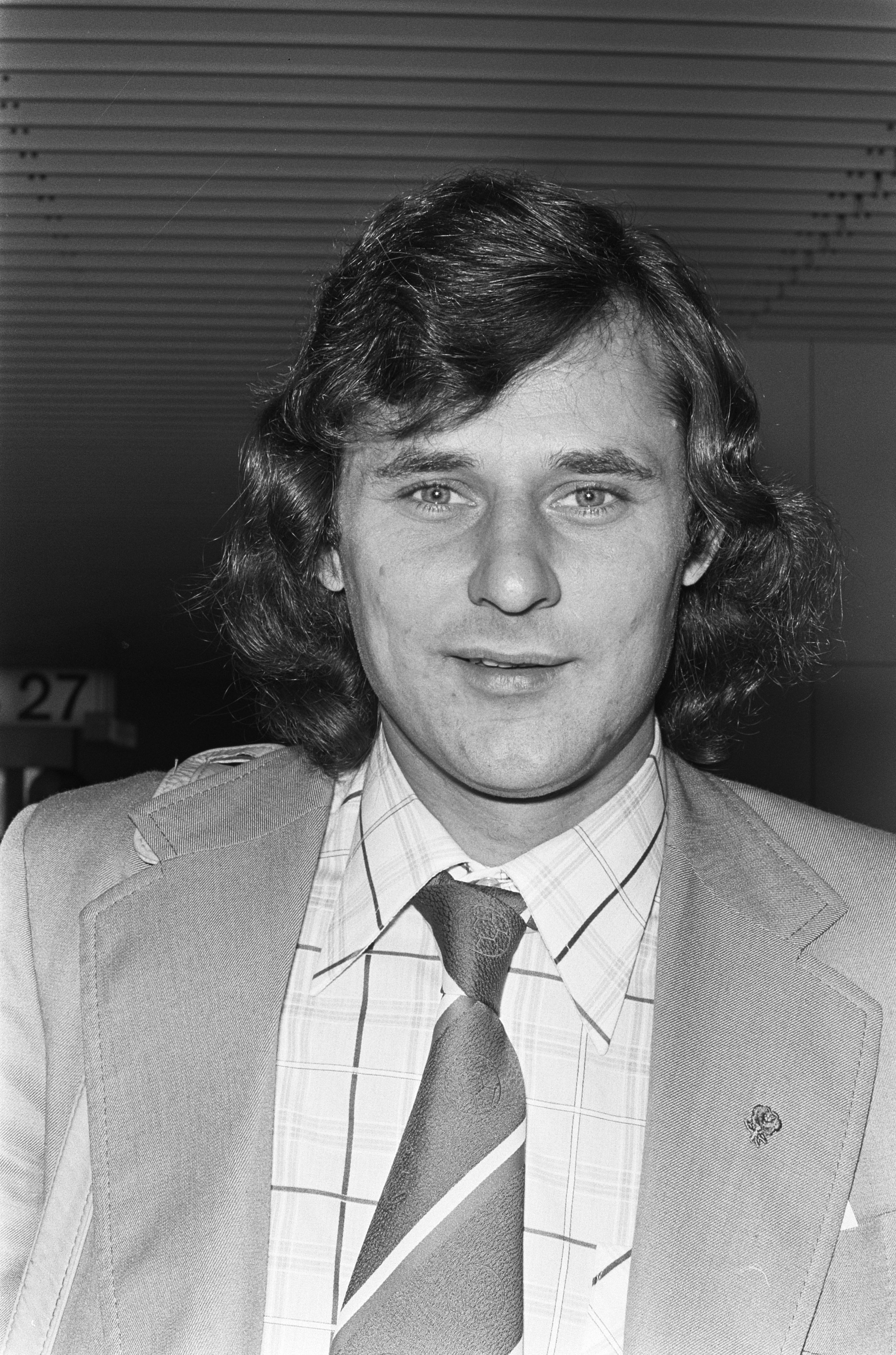
- Tomaszewski in 1975

Personal information
- Date of birth: 9 January 1948 (age 78)
- Place of birth: Wrocław, Poland
- Height: 1.93 m (6 ft 4 in)
- Position: Goalkeeper

Youth career
- 1960–1962: Śląsk Wrocław

Senior career*
Years	Team	Apps	(Gls)
1963–1967	Gwardia Wrocław		(0)
1967–1970	Śląsk Wrocław	25	(0)
1970–1972	Legia Warsaw	19	(0)
1972–1978	ŁKS Łódź	155	(1)
1978–1981	Beerschot	85	(0)
1981–1982	Hércules	12	(0)
1982–1984	ŁKS Łódź	4	(0)
Total		290	(1)

International career
1971–1981	Poland	63	(0)

Managerial career
- 1990: Widzew Łódź
Medal record
Men's football
Representing Poland
FIFA World Cup
Third place	1974 West Germany
Olympic Games
Silver medal – second place	1976 Montreal
- * Club domestic league appearances and goals

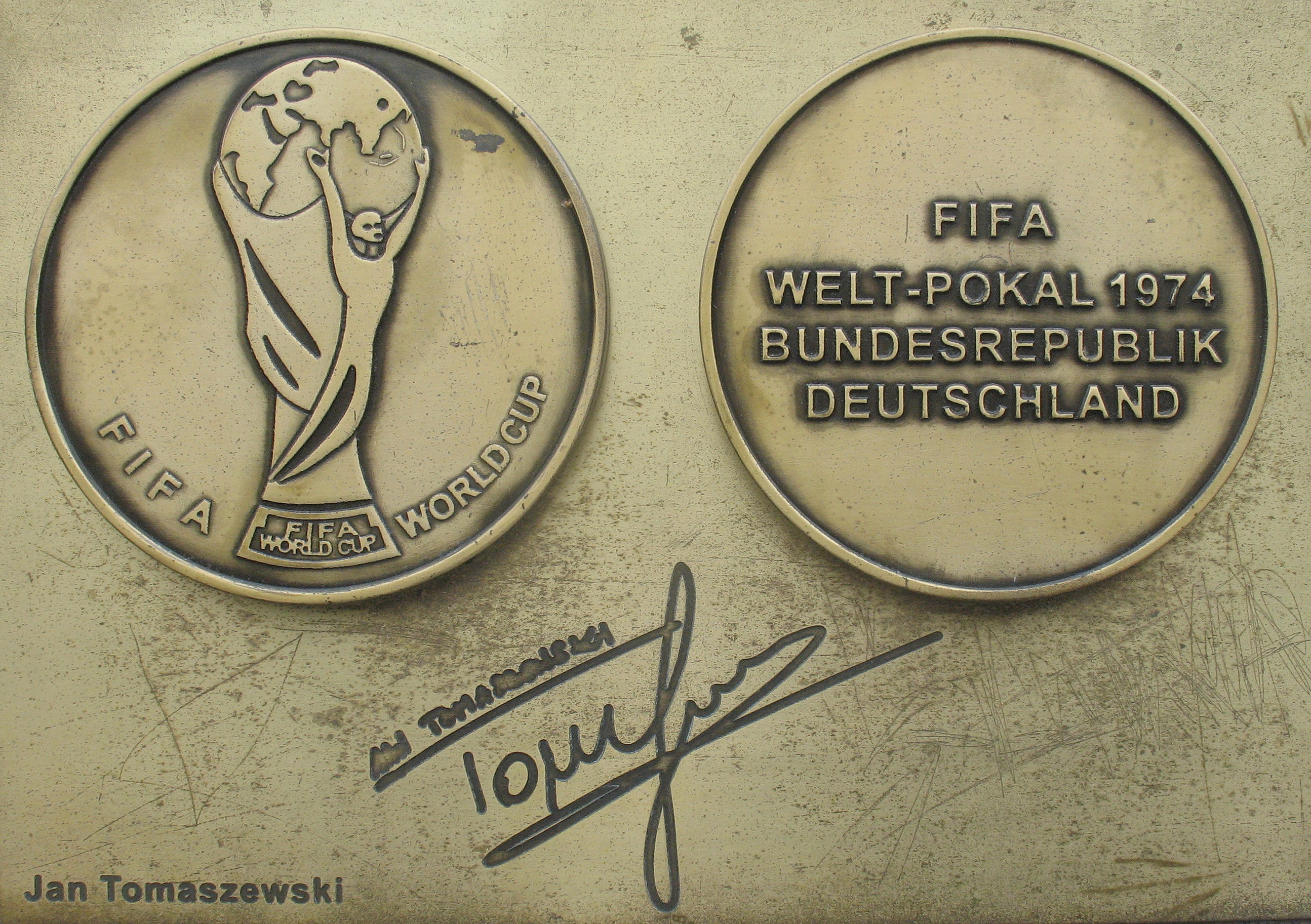
Copy of J. Tomaszewski medal and autograph in Sports Star Avenue in Dziwnów

Jan Tomaszewski (Polish pronunciation: [jan tɔmaˈʂɛvskʲi]; born 9 January 1948) is a Polish former professional footballer who played as a goalkeeper in the 1970s. He kept goal for the Poland national teams that came third at the 1974 World Cup, where he was named Best Goalkeeper, that won the silver medal at the 1976 Summer Olympics, and that competed at the 1978 World Cup. He is regarded as one of the best goalkeepers in the history of Polish football. He was later a football commentator and politician.

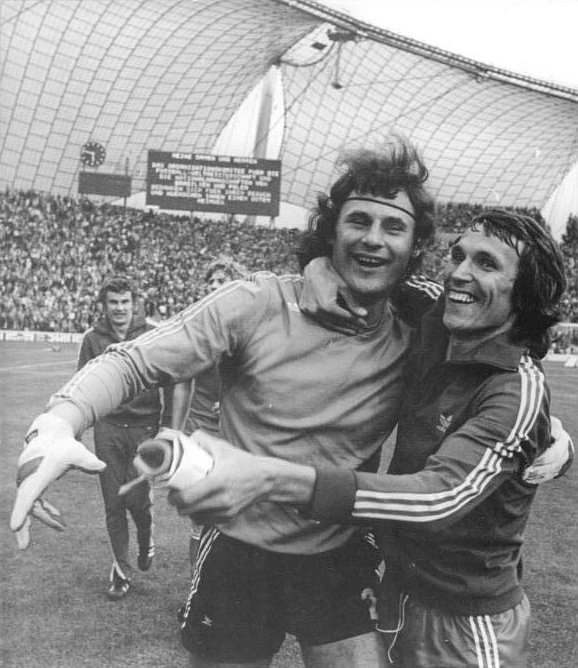
Jan Tomaszewski (left) and Henryk Kasperczak after third place match Poland-Brazil, 1974 FIFA World Cup

== Club career ==
Tomaszewski grew up in Wrocław where his parents were expelled from Vilnius after World War II.

Tomaszewski's club career was mainly at ŁKS Łódź, having been forbidden by Poland's communist government to play abroad before the age of 30, even after coming to international attention.

After the 1978 World Cup, he moved abroad, first to Belgian club Beerschot, and then Hércules in Spain, before retiring in 1984 after two more years with Łódź. In all he won 63 caps for Poland, making him at the time his country's most-capped goalkeeper, although that record was later broken by Artur Boruc in 2016.

== International career ==
Tomaszewski is best remembered by some for his performance for the Poland national team against England, in a qualifying match for the 1974 World Cup, which England needed to win. Tomaszewski had been labelled "a clown" by Brian Clough before the match (the two men however became quite friendly in later years), but had the last laugh as he turned in a man-of-the-match performance repeatedly denying England's attackers; the only goal he conceded being an equalizing penalty from Allan Clarke. Earlier, Jan Domarski had scored for the Poles. Poland drew the game 1–1 and qualified for the finals in West Germany at the expense of England.

Brian Glanville wrote: "In retrospect, to be eliminated by so fine a side as Poland seems no disgrace, but this is a posteriori reasoning. I doubt if England could have made so dazzling a contribution as Poland to the tournament, yet it should be remembered that the Poland which beat England and the Poland which took their place were two very different propositions".

== Other achievements ==
Poland went on to claim third place during a World Cup in which Tomaszewski saved two penalties in two different matches (from Staffan Tapper and Uli Hoeneß), the first goalkeeper in FIFA World Cup history to do so. Tomaszewski went on to win a silver medal with Poland at the 1976 Summer Olympics, and also played in the 1978 World Cup, where Poland disappointed in only managing to get as far as the second group phase. Between 1989 and 1990, he served as the goalkeepers' coach of the Poland national football team led by Andrzej Strejlau.

== Later life ==
After his playing career he worked as a commentator and sports journalist writing articles in magazines including Przegląd Sportowy. In 1986, he graduated from the University of Physical Education in Warsaw. In 1991, he published a book titled Kulisy reprezentacyjnej piłki (Promise Publishing Institute, Łódź). Known for making many controversial statements, he criticised the Polish Football Association (PZPN) on a number of occasions when the organization was run by Marian Dziurowicz and Michał Listkiewicz. He was elected to the Sejm at the 2011 election, representing Łódź for Law and Justice.

== Personal life ==
He was married three times. He married his third wife, Katarzyna (née Calińska), in 1988. She was a Polish Champion in table tennis. Tomaszewski has two daughters with her: Paulina and Małgorzata.

== Career statistics ==
Appearances, conceded goals and clean sheets by national team
National team	Year	Apps	Conceded Goals	Clean Sheets
Poland	1971	1	3	0
Poland	1972	0	0	0
Poland	1973	13	9	6
Poland	1974	12	13	4
Poland	1975	9	7	3
Poland	1976	7	9	2
Poland	1977	12	15	1
Poland	1978	7	3	5
Poland	1979	0	0	0
Poland	1980	0	0	0
Poland	1981	2	1	1
Total		63	60	23

== Honours ==
K. Beerschot V.A.C.

- Belgian Cup: 1979

Poland

- Olympic silver medal: 1976
- FIFA World Cup third place: 1974
