= Adam Musiał =

Polish footballer and manager (1948–2020)

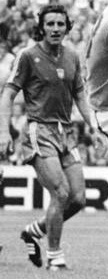

Personal information
- Full name: Adam Musiał
- Date of birth: 18 December 1948
- Place of birth: Wieliczka, Poland
- Date of death: 18 November 2020 (aged 71)
- Place of death: Kraków, Poland
- Height: 1.75 m (5 ft 9 in)
- Position: Defender

Youth career
- 1955–1967: Górnik Wieliczka

Senior career*
Years	Team	Apps	(Gls)
1967–1977	Wisła Kraków	227	(1)
1978–1980	Arka Gdynia	57	(1)
1980–1983	Hereford United	46	(0)
1985–1987	Yonkers Polish American Eagles		

International career
1968–1974	Poland	34	(0)

Managerial career
- 1989–1992: Wisła Kraków
- 1992–1993: Lechia Gdańsk
- 1993–1995: Stal Stalowa Wola
- 1995–1996: GKS Katowice
Medal record
Men's football
Representing Poland
FIFA World Cup
Third place	1974 West Germany
- * Club domestic league appearances and goals

Adam Musiał (18 December 1948 – 18 November 2020) was a Polish football player and manager.

He played for clubs such as Wisła Kraków, Arka Gdynia, Hereford United (England) and Eagles Yonkers New York (USA).

He played for Poland national team, for which he played 34 matches.

He was a participant at the 1974 FIFA World Cup, where Poland won third place.

After he retired from playing, Musiał became a football manager. He led Wisła Kraków, and Piłka nożna named him the manager of the year for 1991.

Adam Musiał was the father of Tomasz, a football referee, and Maciej, a football coach.

== Honours ==
=== Player ===
Arka Gdynia

- Polish Cup: 1978–79

Poland

- FIFA World Cup third place: 1974

=== Manager ===
Individual

- Polish Coach of the Year: 1991
