= Jerzy Gorgoń =

Polish footballer (born 1949)

Personal information
- Full name: Jerzy Paweł Gorgoń
- Date of birth: 18 July 1949 (age 77)
- Place of birth: Zabrze, Poland
- Height: 1.92 m (6 ft 3 1/2 in)
- Position: Defender

Youth career
- 1961–1966: MGKS Mikulczyce

Senior career*
Years	Team	Apps	(Gls)
1967–1980	Górnik Zabrze	236	(22)
1980–1983	St. Gallen	78	(4)
Total		314	(26)

International career
1970–1978	Poland	55	(6)
Medal record
Men's football
Representing Poland
FIFA World Cup
Third place	1974 West Germany
Olympic Games
Gold medal – first place	1972 Munich	Team
Silver medal – second place	1976 Montreal	Team
- * Club domestic league appearances and goals

Jerzy Paweł Gorgoń (born 18 July 1949) is a Polish former professional footballer who is best remembered for his participation in the 1972 Summer Olympics. He was a 6'4" tall central defender, who became well known in 1967 while playing for Górnik Zabrze. He helped Zabrze to five consecutive Polish Cups in 1968–72. Gorgoń participated in the 1974 World Cup in, then, West Germany, winning third place with the Poland national team and being his squad's defensive pillar.

He won 55 international caps overall, and took on the role of captaincy once. He also played in the 1976 Summer Olympics in Montreal.

He moved to Switzerland in 1980 to play for St. Gallen. He later coached the reserve and youth teams of Blau-Weiss St. Gallen as well as at the football academy in Gossau.

== Career statistics ==
=== International ===
Appearances and goals by national team and year
National team	Year	Apps	Goals
Poland	1970	2	0
Poland	1971	4	0
Poland	1972	9	2
Poland	1973	13	3
Poland	1974	11	1
Poland	1975	5	0
Poland	1976	5	0
Poland	1977	0	0
Poland	1978	6	0
Total		55	6

Scores and results list Poland's goal tally first, score column indicates score after each Gorgoń goal.

List of international goals scored by Jerzy Gorgoń
No.	Date	Venue	Opponent	Score	Result	Competition
1	1 September 1972	Nürnberg, West Germany	East Germany	1–0	2–1	1972 Summer Olympics
2	1 September 1972	Nürnberg, West Germany	East Germany	2–1	2–1	1972 Summer Olympics
3	1 August 1973	Toronto, Canada	Canada	2–1	3–1	Friendly
4	5 August 1973	Los Angeles, United States	Mexico	1–0	1–0	Friendly
5	8 August 1973	Monterrey, Mexico	Mexico	1–1	2–1	Friendly
6	19 June 1974	Munich, West Germany	Haiti	4–0	7–0	1974 FIFA World Cup

== Honours ==
Górnik Zabrze

- Ekstraklasa: 1970–71, 1971–72
- II liga West: 1978–79
- Polish Cup: 1967–68, 1968–69, 1969–70, 1970–71, 1971–72

Poland

- Olympic gold medal: 1972
- Olympic silver medal: 1976
- FIFA World Cup third place: 1974

Individual

- Polish Football Association National Team of the Century: 1919–2019
