= Robert Gadocha =

Polish footballer (born 1946)

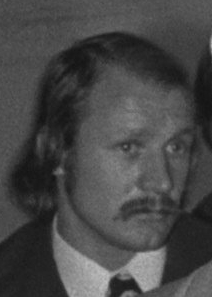
- Gadocha in 1973

Personal information
- Date of birth: 10 January 1946 (age 80)
- Place of birth: Kraków, Poland
- Height: 1.70 m (5 ft 7 in)
- Position: Left winger

Youth career
- 1957–1965: Garbarnia Kraków

Senior career*
Years	Team	Apps	(Gls)
1965–1966	Wawel Kraków		
1966–1975	Legia Warsaw	206	(72)
1975–1977	Nantes	45	(8)
1978	Chicago Sting	12	(1)
1980–1981	Hartford Hellions (indoor)	21	(14)

International career
1967–1975	Poland	62	(16)
Medal record
Men's football
Representing Poland
FIFA World Cup
Third place	1974 West Germany
Olympic Games
Gold medal – first place	1972 Munich	Team
- * Club domestic league appearances and goals

Robert Gadocha (born 10 January 1946) is a Polish former professional footballer who played as a left winger.

Gadocha, who started his career in Garbarnia Kraków. later also played for FC Nantes, and briefly in the United States for Chicago Sting, his last professional team. His departure to France happened when he was 29. In Poland it was forbidden for a long time to departure abroad to play football. He was the first Polish player to get a legal permission to move abroad to play football.

He was a member of the Poland national team that won the gold medal at the 1972 Summer Olympics in Munich, as well as a member of the team that finished third in the 1974 FIFA World Cup in West Germany. He has a total of 16 goals in 62 games with the Poland national team.

Gadocha holds the record for the most assists in a single match in World Cup finals history, alongside Giovanni Ferrari, assisting four goals in his team's 7–0 victory against Haiti in the group stage of the 1974 World Cup.

In 1978, Gadocha moved to the Chicago Sting of the North American Soccer League. He also spent one season, 1980–81, with the Hartford Hellions of the Major Indoor Soccer League.

== Career statistics ==
=== International ===
Appearances and goals by national team and year
National team	Year	Apps	Goals
Poland	1967	3	0
Poland	1968	4	1
Poland	1969	2	0
Poland	1970	5	1
Poland	1971	5	2
Poland	1972	10	4
Poland	1973	15	5
Poland	1974	14	2
Poland	1975	4	1
Total		62	16

== Honours ==
Legia Warsaw

- Ekstraklasa: 1968–69, 1969–70
- Polish Cup: 1972–73

Nantes

- French Division 1: 1976–77

Poland

- Olympic gold medal: 1972
- FIFA World Cup third place: 1974

Individual

- World XI: 1974
- Sport Ideal European XI: 1974
