= Lesław Ćmikiewicz =

Polish footballer and manager (born 1948)

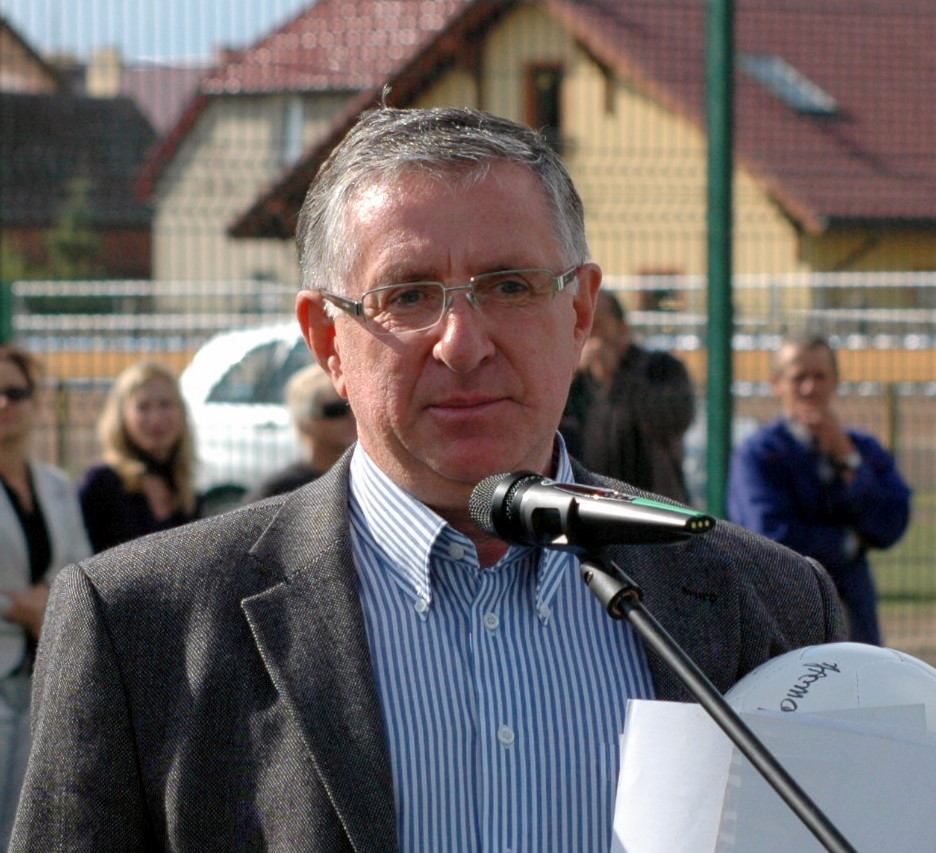
- Ćmikiewicz in 2009

Personal information
- Date of birth: 25 August 1948 (age 78)
- Place of birth: Wrocław, Poland
- Height: 1.73 m (5 ft 8 in)
- Position: Midfielder

Senior career*
Years	Team	Apps	(Gls)
1965–1970	Śląsk Wrocław		
1970–1979	Legia Warsaw	225	(14)
1980–1981	New York Arrows (indoor)	6	(1)
1981	Chicago Horizon (indoor)	11	(12)

International career
1970–1979	Poland	57	(0)

Managerial career
- 1982–1985: Motor Lublin
- 1985–1986: Stal Rzeszów
- 1986: Górnik Zabrze
- 1987–1988: Hutnik Kraków
- 1988–1989: Pogoń Szczecin
- 1989–1990: Gwardia Warsaw
- 1993: Poland (caretaker)
- 1994: RKS Radomsko
- 1999–2001: Poland U21
- 2005–2006: Tur Turek
Medal record
Men's football
Representing Poland
FIFA World Cup
Third place	1974 West Germany
Olympic Games
Gold medal – first place	1972 Munich	Team
Silver medal – second place	1976 Montreal	Team
- * Club domestic league appearances and goals

Lesław Ćmikiewicz (born 25 August 1948 in Wrocław) is a Polish former professional football manager and former player. He played for Polish clubs including Śląsk Wrocław and Legia Warsaw. He also played for the New York Arrows and Chicago Horizon in the Major Indoor Soccer League.

Ćmikiewicz played for the Poland national team, for which he earned 57 caps. He was a participant at the 1972 Summer Olympics, where Poland won the gold medal; at the 1976 Summer Olympics, where Poland won the silver medal and at the 1974 FIFA World Cup, where Poland won the bronze medal.

As a coach, he coached a few Polish football clubs, including Stal Rzeszów and later most notably and briefly, the Poland national team and the Poland U21 team. He most recently worked as an assistant coach at Cracovia in 2008.

== Career statistics ==
=== International ===
Appearances and goals by national team and year
National team	Year	Apps	Goals
Poland	1970	5	0
Poland	1971	2	0
Poland	1972	8	0
Poland	1973	14	0
Poland	1974	10	0
Poland	1975	6	0
Poland	1976	6	0
Poland	1977	0	0
Poland	1978	3	0
Poland	1979	3	0
Total		57	0

== Honours ==
=== Player ===
Legia Warsaw

- Polish Cup: 1972–73, 1979–80

Poland

- Olympic gold medal: 1972
- Olympic silver medal: 1976
- FIFA World Cup third place: 1974

Orders

- Gold Cross of Merit: 1972
- Order of Polonia Restituta Officer's Cross: 2004
