= Austria v West Germany (1978 FIFA World Cup) =

1978 Austria v West Germany football match
The Miracle of Córdoba (German: Das Wunder von Córdoba) The Disgrace of Córdoba (German: Die Schmach von Córdoba)
- Event: 1978 FIFA World Cup Group A
Austria	West Germany
(Austria)	(West Germany)
3	2
- Date: 21 June 1978
- Venue: Chateau Carreras, Córdoba
- Referee: Abraham Klein (Israel)
- Attendance: 38,318

The 1978 Austria v West Germany match (known in Austria as Das Wunder von Córdoba (The Miracle of Córdoba) and in Germany as Die Schmach von Córdoba (The Disgrace of Córdoba)), describes the game of football between Austria and defending World Champions West Germany that occurred on 21 June 1978 at the conclusion of the second round of the 1978 FIFA World Cup, in the city of Córdoba.

The game is fondly remembered by fans of the Austria national team for being the first time in 47 years that Austria had defeated a team from either the Western or Eastern side of the then-partitioned Germany.

== The build-up ==
In the first round, Austria had surprisingly won their group, ahead of Brazil even though they had lost to them. A rather lacklustre West Germany had only finished second in their group, following two scoreless draws. While the West German team still contained a number of players who had contributed to winning the 1974 World Cup, others had retired from the national team, being dissatisfied with the old-fashioned attitude of German Football Association (DFB) leaders and coach Helmut Schön, who at age 62 was about to retire after the tournament.

In the second round, the Austrians lost their first two games, against the Netherlands (1–5) and Italy (0–1), which meant that they were already eliminated from contention before the last game. The West Germans had managed another two draws against the Dutch (opponents in the 1974 final) and the Italians (opponents in the 1970 semi-final, the so-called Game of the Century).

The final group games of the second round gave West Germany and Italy the opportunity to determine directly who would advance to the Final. If their simultaneous games (both at 13:45 local time) ended in a draw (there was no extra-time or penalty shoot-out, as it was a group stage game), then the Netherlands would progress to the final and Italy would qualify for the match for third place. A draw between the Dutch and the Italians combined with a decisive five goal victory by West Germany over Austria would give the West Germans the advantage over the Dutch, and a berth in the Final. If the Netherlands–Italy game had a winner, West Germany could still qualify for the match for third place by beating Austria, or in case of an Italian loss (or Netherlands loss by at least four goals), even with a draw.

Second round, Group A

Netherlands	2	1	1	0	7	3	+4	3
Italy	2	1	1	0	1	0	+1	3
West Germany	2	0	2	0	2	2	0	2
Austria	2	0	0	2	1	6	−5	0

== Match ==
=== Summary ===
In both games, the first goal was scored in the 19th minute, Karl-Heinz Rummenigge scoring for West Germany and Ernie Brandts scoring for Italy with an own goal. When the Dutch equalised in the 49th minute, the West Germans were still four goals shy of advancing to the final. Then Berti Vogts scored in the 59th minute, but in his own net. Hans Krankl then scored to put Austria ahead, but Bernd Hölzenbein equalised for West Germany a few minutes later. When the Dutch scored what transpired to be their winning goal in the 76th minute, the West Germans were placed second in the group, ahead of the Italians, having a goal tally of 4–4, compared to the lesser 2–2 of Italy. West German fans could look forward to the match for third place, until Krankl scored in the 87th minute to put Austria 3–2 ahead. The Germans were not able to score in the remaining minutes, and, having also now been eliminated, joined the Austrians on their already pre-arranged flight home.

The commentary provided during the last few minutes of the game by Edi Finger, and in particular his exclamation following Krankl's goal "Tor! Tor! Tor! Tor! Tor! Tor! I wer' narrisch!" are familiar to most Austrians and Germans from being repeated many times on radio and television. Although the Cordoba game was not a World Cup final, in Austrian popular culture Finger's commentary is comparable with Herbert Zimmermann's famous commentary at the end of the 1954 World Cup Final, between West Germany and Hungary, the game often called the Miracle of Bern.

A translation of Finger's commentary follows:

"[Krankl] is in the box. He shoots! Goal! Goal! Goal! Goal! Goal! Goal! I am going bonkers! Krankl has scored. It is 3–2 to Austria! Ladies and gentlemen, we are hugging each other here, Rippel, my colleague, graduate engineer Posch, we're kissing each other ... 3–2 to Austria, by our Krankl's magnificent goal. He beat all of them. And just wait a minute, wait a minute and perhaps we can pour ourselves a small glass of wine. That's something you have to have seen. I'm standing up now, the South American [crowd]. I think we have beaten them! However, the Germans attack again, watch out, headed away again. The ball goes to the left, to Pezzey, Pezzey, but lads, don't break down back there, stay upright! Still two minutes to go, the ball's with the Austrians, but we don't want to jinx it. There is a cross into the box, but Kreuz has rescued it again!

Germany are sending everyone up front. A chance for the Germans! Well? It is wide! Oh, Abramczik, I'd like to kiss Abramczik for it. He really helped us -- alone in front of the goal. Brave Abramczik has shot wide. The poor guy will fret. 30 seconds to go. 3–2 to Austria. After 47 years, ladies and gentlemen, an Austrian national team, but what a team, a world class team that's performing today, is in the lead 3–2 against the Federal Republic. And I don't dare to watch anymore. The ball's kicked out of the match. Referee Klein from Israel, a truly outstanding referee; it was not easy for him today, but he performed magnificently up to now. 45th minute, once again the ball's with Germany and Prohaska kicks it away. And now it is over! It's over, it's finished, it's done, it's over! Germany have been beaten, ladies and gentlemen, for the first time in 47 years, Austria have defeated Germany."

=== Details ===
21 June 1978
13:45 ART

Austria	3–2	West Germany
Vogts 59' (o.g.); Krankl 66', 87'		Rummenigge 19'; Hölzenbein 68'

Estadio Olímpico Chateau Carreras, Córdoba
Attendance: 38,318
Referee: Abraham Klein (Israel)

Austria	West Germany

GK	1	Friedl Koncilia
DF	2	Robert Sara (c)	(yellow card) 85'
DF	3	Erich Obermayer
DF	5	Bruno Pezzey
DF	14	Heinrich Strasser
MF	7	Josef Hickersberger
MF	8	Herbert Prohaska	(yellow card) 69'
MF	12	Eduard Krieger
FW	9	Hans Krankl
FW	10	Wilhelm Kreuz
FW	18	Walter Schachner		(substituted off) 71'
Substitutes:
FW	17	Franz Oberacher		(substituted on) 71'
Manager:
Helmut Senekowitsch

GK	1	Sepp Maier
SW	5	Manfred Kaltz
RB	2	Berti Vogts (c)
CB	4	Rolf Rüssmann
LB	3	Bernard Dietz
MF	6	Rainer Bonhof
MF	15	Erich Beer		(substituted off) 45'
MF	17	Bernd Hölzenbein
FW	7	Rüdiger Abramczik	(yellow card) 69'
FW	11	Karl-Heinz Rummenigge
FW	14	Dieter Müller		(substituted off) 60'
Substitute:
MF	20	Hansi Müller		(substituted on) 45'
FW	9	Klaus Fischer		(substituted on) 60'
Manager:
Helmut Schön

== Aftermath ==
West German fans were dissatisfied with the performance and attitude of their 1978 team, contrasted with the Austrians, who fought fiercely with their neighbours in a game that had no significance to Austria in terms of further progression in the tournament. Finger's phrase "I wer' narrisch!" ("I'm going crazy!") became the slogan of several marketing and advertising campaigns.

With a new coach, Jupp Derwall, the West Germans went on to win the 1980 European championship. Then in 1982, at the next World Cup in Spain, West Germany and Austria met again, in a final group-stage game called the Disgrace of Gijón due to both teams seemingly cooperating in order to advance at the cost of a third team, Algeria. This time, the West Germans had to win to avoid elimination from the tournament, but doing so by only one or two goals would not harm the Austrians and send both teams through to the next round at the expense of Algeria, who had beaten West Germany 2–1 in the first game of the group. Hence, after West Germany scored early, the two teams slowed down in the second half, and towards the end, kicked the ball around aimlessly, in stark contrast to 1978, and to worldwide howls of derision. The game was subsequently dubbed the "Nichtangriffspakt von Gijón" (Non-aggression Pact of Gijón).

Since that match in 1982, as of 2026, Germany has played in five World Cup finals, winning two, whilst Austria has only qualified for three World Cups (1990, 1998 and 2026) failing to reach the round of 16 all three times. Austria also played the by now re-unified Germany at UEFA Euro 2008 Group B, co-hosted between Austria and Switzerland. On this occasion, Germany defeated Austria 1–0 in their capital Vienna to qualify for the next round and knock the co-hosts out of the tournament.

On 16 May 2008, exactly one month before the Euro 2008 group match between Austria and Germany, the Swiss performance artist Massimo Furlan staged a one-man re-enactment of the 1978 World Cup match between the sides in front of 2,500 spectators at Rapid Vienna's stadium. Furlan imitated Hans Krankl's match performance and goal celebrations, with Edi Finger Jr. reproducing his father's famous radio commentary of the match.

== See also ==
- Austria at the FIFA World Cup
- Germany at the FIFA World Cup
