= 1978 FIFA World Cup Group A =

Football tournament group stage

Group A of the 1978 FIFA World Cup was one of two groups of nations competing for the De facto semi-finals the 1978 FIFA World Cup. The group's first round of matches began on 14 June and its last matches were played on 21 June. All six group matches were played either at the Estadio Chateau Carreras in Córdoba, or the Estadio Monumental in the capital Buenos Aires. The group consisted of West Germany (the Defending Champions) as well as the Netherlands (the former runners up), Italy and Austria. The Netherlands advanced to the final match, and Italy advanced to the match for third place.

== Qualified teams ==
The winners of Group 1 and 3 and the runners-up of Group 2 and 4 qualified for Group A of the second round.

Group	Winners
1	Italy
3	Austria
Group	Runners-up
2	West Germany
4	Netherlands

== Standings ==
Pos	Team	Pld	W	D	L	GF	GA	GD	Pts	Qualification
1	Netherlands	3	2	1	0	9	4	+5	5	Advance to final
2	Italy	3	1	1	1	2	2	0	3	Advance to match for third place
3	West Germany	3	0	2	1	4	5	−1	2	
4	Austria	3	1	0	2	4	8	−4	2	

Source: FIFA

== Matches ==
=== Austria vs Netherlands ===
After an unconvincing group stage performance the Netherlands knew they had to play better if they were to qualify for the finals, and took on surprise qualifiers Austria in their first game. They started well when an unmarked Ernie Brandts headed in Arie Haan's free kick. The Dutch then won a penalty kick after Gerhard Breitenberger fouled Wim Jansen and Rob Rensenbrink neatly scored. Rensenbrink then took advantage of some poor defending to provide assist for Johnny Rep to score on either side of half time. Austria which created several chances and were unlucky to score in the first half got one back in the eightieth minute when defender Erich Obermayer scored a brilliant lob over the Dutch goalkeeper for a goal. The Dutch weren't to be deterred as Rensenbrink provided yet another assist this time Willy van de Kerkhof to score just two minutes later.

14 June 1978
13:45 ART

Austria	1–5	Netherlands
Obermayer 80'		Brandts 6'; Rensenbrink 35' (pen.); Rep 36', 53'; W. van de Kerkhof 82'

Estadio Chateau Carreras, Córdoba
Attendance: 25,050
Referee: John Gordon (Scotland)

Austria	Netherlands

GK	1	Friedl Koncilia
DF	2	Robert Sara (c)
DF	3	Erich Obermayer
DF	4	Gerhard Breitenberger
DF	5	Bruno Pezzey
MF	7	Josef Hickersberger
MF	8	Herbert Prohaska
MF	11	Kurt Jara
MF	12	Eduard Krieger
FW	9	Hans Krankl
FW	10	Wilhelm Kreuz
Manager:
Helmut Senekowitsch

GK	1	Piet Schrijvers
DF	2	Jan Poortvliet
DF	5	Ruud Krol (c)
DF	7	Piet Wildschut
DF	22	Ernie Brandts	(substituted off) 66'
MF	6	Wim Jansen
MF	9	Arie Haan
MF	11	Willy van de Kerkhof
FW	10	René van de Kerkhof	(substituted off) 60'
FW	12	Rob Rensenbrink
FW	16	Johnny Rep
Substitutions:
MF	3	Dick Schoenaker	(substituted on) 60'
DF	4	Adrie van Kraay	(substituted on) 66'
Manager:
(Austria) Ernst Happel

=== Italy vs West Germany ===
14 June 1978
13:45 ART

Italy	0–0	West Germany

Estadio Monumental, Buenos Aires
Attendance: 67,547
Referee: Dušan Maksimović (Yugoslavia)

Italy	West Germany

GK	1	Dino Zoff (c)
DF	2	Mauro Bellugi
DF	3	Antonio Cabrini
DF	5	Claudio Gentile
DF	8	Gaetano Scirea
MF	9	Giancarlo Antognoni	(substituted off) 46'
MF	10	Romeo Benetti
MF	14	Marco Tardelli
MF	16	Franco Causio
CF	18	Roberto Bettega
CF	21	Paolo Rossi
Substitutions:
MF	15	Renato Zaccarelli	(substituted on) 46'
Manager:
Enzo Bearzot

GK	1	Sepp Maier
SW	5	Manfred Kaltz
RB	2	Berti Vogts (c)
CB	4	Rolf Rüssmann
LB	3	Bernard Dietz
MF	6	Rainer Bonhof
MF	8	Herbert Zimmerman		(substituted off) 53'
MF	10	Heinz Flohe		(substituted off) 68'
MF	17	Bernd Hoelzenbein
FW	9	Klaus Fischer
FW	11	Karl-Heinz Rummenigge
Substitute:
DF	13	Harald Konopka	(substituted on) 53'
MF	15	Erich Beer	(substituted on) 68'
Manager:
Helmut Schoen

=== Netherlands vs West Germany ===
This highly anticipated match was a repeat of the 1974 FIFA World Cup Final, with the Netherlands fielding six players who had played that day and West Germany four. The match official Ramón Barreto of Uruguay coincidentally had also been one of the linesmen at the 1974 final.

The 1974 final had started with the Dutch scoring within two minutes, and in this match there was another early goal, although it went the Germans' way. The Dutch goaltender Piet Schrijvers could only parry Rainer Bonhof's free kick right into the path of Rüdiger Abramczik, who headed home. The Netherlands equalized around the thirty-minute mark when Arie Haan let fly from 35 yards and into the top corner.

Knowing a draw would be enough Netherlands refrained from taking chances in the second half. Against the run of play West Germany were awarded a soft free-kick, the Dutch were complaining with the referee and did not keep their concentration Erich Beer crossed for Dieter Müller to power in a header. The goal gave the Netherlands the momentum to score though and eight minutes from time René van de Kerkhof took a pass from his twin brother Willy, cut inside a defender and smashed home. There would be a few more chances as Johnny Rep hit the woodwork and Schrijvers was forced to save from Beer.

The match ended in bizarre fashion, with substitute Dick Nanninga shown a yellow card for an off the ball incident and then seconds later referee Barreto showing the same player a red card for apparently laughing at the decision to give him a card. It took five minutes to restore order on the field as the bewildered Nanninga was led off.

18 June 1978
16:45 ART

Netherlands	2–2	West Germany
Haan 27'; R. van de Kerkhof 82'		Abramczik 3'; D. Müller 70'

Estadio Chateau Carreras, Córdoba
Attendance: 40,750
Referee: Ramón Barreto (Uruguay)

Netherlands	West Germany

GK	1	Piet Schrijvers
DF	2	Jan Poortvliet
DF	5	Ruud Krol (c)
DF	7	Piet Wildschut		(substituted off) 79'
DF	22	Ernie Brandts
MF	6	Wim Jansen
MF	9	Arie Haan
MF	11	Willy van de Kerkhof	(yellow card) 6'
FW	10	René van de Kerkhof
FW	12	Rob Rensenbrink
FW	16	Johnny Rep
Substitutions:
FW	18	Dick Nanninga	(yellow card) 87' (red card) 88'	(substituted on) 79'
Manager:
(Austria) Ernst Happel

GK	1	Sepp Maier	(yellow card) 84'
SW	5	Manfred Kaltz
RB	2	Berti Vogts (c)
CB	4	Rolf Rüssmann
LB	3	Bernard Dietz
MF	6	Rainer Bonhof
MF	15	Erich Beer
MF	17	Bernd Hölzenbein
FW	7	Rüdiger Abramczik
FW	11	Karl-Heinz Rummenigge
FW	14	Dieter Müller
Manager:
Helmut Schön

=== Italy vs Austria ===
18 June 1978
16:45 ART

Italy	1–0	Austria
Rossi 13'

Estadio Monumental, Buenos Aires
Attendance: 66,695
Referee: Francis Rion (Belgium)

Italy	Austria

GK	1	Dino Zoff (c)
DF	2	Mauro Bellugi	(substituted off) 46'
DF	3	Antonio Cabrini
DF	5	Claudio Gentile
DF	8	Gaetano Scirea
MF	10	Romeo Benetti
MF	14	Marco Tardelli
MF	15	Renato Zaccarelli
MF	16	Franco Causio
CF	18	Roberto Bettega	(substituted off) 72'
CF	21	Paolo Rossi
Substitutions:
DF	4	Antonello Cuccureddu	(substituted on) 46'
FW	19	Francesco Graziani	(substituted on) 72'
Manager:
Enzo Bearzot

GK	1	Friedl Koncilia
DF	2	Robert Sara (c)
DF	3	Erich Obermayer
DF	5	Bruno Pezzey
DF	14	Heinrich Strasser
MF	7	Josef Hickersberger
MF	8	Herbert Prohaska
MF	12	Eduard Krieger
FW	9	Hans Krankl
FW	10	Wilhelm Kreuz
FW	18	Walter Schachner	(substituted off) 63'
Substitutes:
FW	19	Hans Pirkner	(substituted on) 63'
Manager:
Helmut Senekowitsch

=== Austria vs West Germany ===
21 June 1978
13:45 ART

Austria	3–2	West Germany
Vogts 59' (o.g.); Krankl 66', 87'		Rummenigge 19'; Hölzenbein 68'

Estadio Olímpico Chateau Carreras, Córdoba
Attendance: 38,318
Referee: Abraham Klein (Israel)

Austria	West Germany

GK	1	Friedl Koncilia
DF	2	Robert Sara (c)	(yellow card) 85'
DF	3	Erich Obermayer
DF	5	Bruno Pezzey
DF	14	Heinrich Strasser
MF	7	Josef Hickersberger
MF	8	Herbert Prohaska	(yellow card) 69'
MF	12	Eduard Krieger
FW	9	Hans Krankl
FW	10	Wilhelm Kreuz
FW	18	Walter Schachner		(substituted off) 71'
Substitutes:
FW	17	Franz Oberacher		(substituted on) 71'
Manager:
Helmut Senekowitsch

GK	1	Sepp Maier
DF	2	Berti Vogts (c)
DF	3	Bernard Dietz
DF	4	Rolf Rüssmann
DF	5	Manfred Kaltz
MF	6	Rainer Bonhof
MF	15	Erich Beer		(substituted off) 45'
MF	17	Bernd Hölzenbein
FW	7	Rüdiger Abramczik	(yellow card) 69'
FW	11	Karl-Heinz Rummenigge
FW	14	Dieter Müller		(substituted off) 60'
Substitute:
MF	20	Hansi Müller		(substituted on) 45'
FW	9	Klaus Fischer		(substituted on) 60'
Manager:
Helmut Schön

=== Italy vs Netherlands ===
This match was a semi-final in all but name with the winner being assured a place in the final, although the Netherlands could advance with a draw and a Germany draw or loss. Italy started the positive and scored when Ernie Brandts in an attempt to stop Roberto Bettega only succeeded in putting the ball into his own net. The goal would have consequences for the Netherlands as Piet Schrijvers was injured on the play and had to be stretchered off for Jan Jongbloed. Italy dominated the remainder of the first half. In a physical match Johnny Rep was cautioned for fouling Romeo Benetti, who was later to pick up a yellow card himself for fouling Rensenbrink, meaning the Italian defender would miss the final should Italy reach it. Early in the second half Arie Haan was cautioned for a challenge on Marco Tardelli who later also picked up a yellow card meaning he too would miss Italy's next match. Some felt that Antonio Cabrini's challenge on Haan many felt warranted a red card, not just a yellow. Shortly after half time Brandts, who had earlier scored an own goal, blasted home a shot to equalize. Then fourteen minutes from time Haan hit an audacious shot 30 yards out that went off Zoff's left post and into the net.

21 June 1978
13:45 ART

Italy	1–2	Netherlands
Brandts 19' (o.g.)		Brandts 49'; Haan 76'

Estadio Monumental, Buenos Aires
Attendance: 67,433
Referee: Ángel Franco Martínez (Spain)

Italy	Netherlands

GK	1	Dino Zoff (c)
DF	3	Antonio Cabrini	(yellow card) 65'
DF	4	Antonello Cuccureddu
DF	5	Claudio Gentile
DF	8	Gaetano Scirea
MF	10	Romeo Benetti	(yellow card) 40'	(substituted off) 77'
MF	14	Marco Tardelli	(yellow card) 70'
MF	15	Renato Zaccarelli
MF	16	Franco Causio		(substituted off) 46'
CF	18	Roberto Bettega
CF	21	Paolo Rossi
Substitutions:
MF	17	Claudio Sala		(substituted on) 46'
FW	19	Francesco Graziani		(substituted on) 77'
Manager:
Enzo Bearzot

GK	1	Piet Schrijvers		(substituted off) 21'
DF	2	Jan Poortvliet
DF	5	Ruud Krol (c)
DF	6	Wim Jansen
DF	22	Ernie Brandts
MF	9	Arie Haan	(yellow card) 50'
MF	11	Willy van de Kerkhof
MF	13	Johan Neeskens
FW	10	René van de Kerkhof
FW	12	Rob Rensenbrink
FW	16	Johnny Rep	(yellow card) 35'	(substituted off) 65'
Substitutions:
GK	8	Jan Jongbloed		(substituted on) 21'
DF	4	Adrie van Kraay		(substituted on) 65'
Manager:
(Austria) Ernst Happel

== See also ==
- Austria at the FIFA World Cup
- Germany at the FIFA World Cup
- Italy at the FIFA World Cup
- Netherlands at the FIFA World Cup
