= Germany–Netherlands football rivalry =

Football rivalry between the national football teams of Germany and the Netherlands

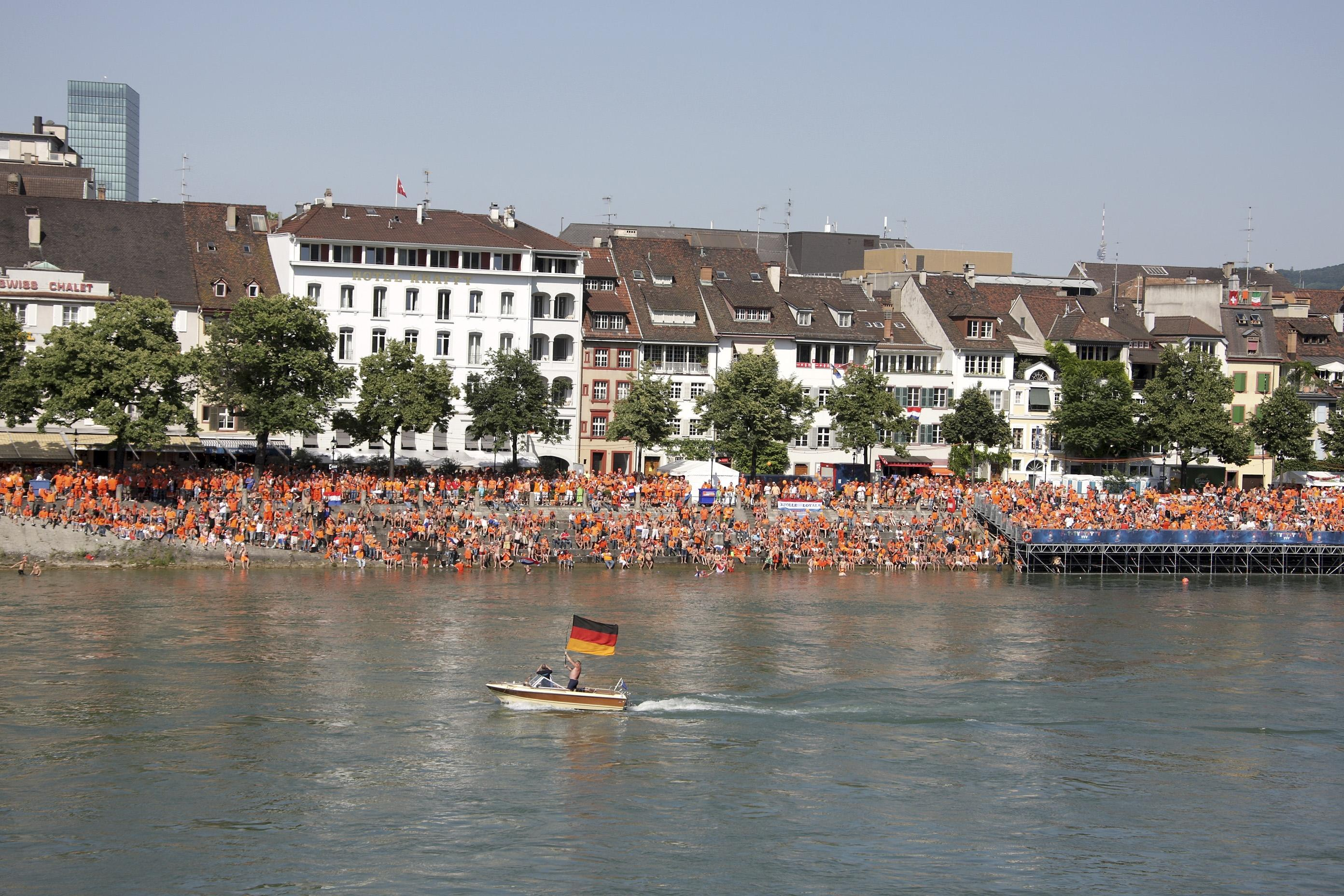
- Two German fans wave their flag at a group of Dutch supporters during UEFA Euro 2008 in Basel.
- Location: Western Europe
- Teams: Germany; Netherlands
- First meeting: 24 April 1910; Friendly; Netherlands 4–2 Germany
- Latest meeting: 16 November 2026; UEFA Nations League; Germany 5–0 Netherlands

Statistics
- Total meetings: 50
- Most wins: Germany (19)
- Most player appearances: Ruud Krol; Lothar Matthäus (8 each)
- Top scorer: Jan Thomée (5)
- All-time series: Germany: 19; Draw: 18; Netherlands: 12
- Largest victory: West Germany 7–0 Netherlands (21 October 1959)
- Largest goal scoring: Netherlands 5–5 Germany (24 March 1912)
- Longest win streak: West Germany (4): 1. (Netherlands) 1–2 (West Germany) (1957); 2. (West Germany) 7–0 (Netherlands) (1959); 3. (Netherlands) 2–4 (West Germany) (1966); 4. (West Germany) 2–1 (Netherlands) (1974)
- Longest unbeaten streak: Netherlands (6): 1. (Netherlands) 4–2 (German Empire) (April 1910); 2. (German Empire) 1–2 (Netherlands) (October 1910); 3. (Netherlands) 5–5 (German Empire) (March 1912); 4. (German Empire) 2–3 (Netherlands) (November 1912); 5. (Netherlands) 4–4 (German Empire) (1914); 6. (Germany) 0–0 (Netherlands) (1923)

The Germany–Netherlands football rivalry (German: Niederländisch-deutsche Fußballrivalität; Dutch: Duits-Nederlandse derby) is one of the few longstanding football rivalries at a national level. Beginning in 1974 when the Dutch lost the 1974 FIFA World Cup to West Germany in the final (though deeply rooted in Dutch anti-German sentiment due to the German occupation of the Netherlands during World War II), the rivalry between the two nations has become one of the best known international football rivalries in the world.

Both football nations have been among the top ranked according to the strongest football nations by Elo Ratings, and have met a total of 48 times (of which 16 matches were competitive) which resulted in 18 victories for Germany, 18 draws, and 12 victories for the Netherlands.

== History ==
=== 1974–88 ===
For the Dutch, the origins of the rivalry are primarily based on the anti-German sentiment resulting from World War II in which, during a five-year German occupation, a quarter of a million Dutch people died and the country itself was devastated. In particular, matches up until 1988 show a strong emotional connection between war experiences alongside the sportive element among the Dutch, but this inevitably lessened with the passage of time.

I didn't give a damn about the score. 1–0 was enough, as long as we could humiliate them. I hate them. They murdered my family. My father, my sister, two of my brothers. Each time I faced Germany I was angst-filled.

— Willem van Hanegem (b. 1944), Dutch midfielder

When Germany and the Netherlands met in the final of the 1974 FIFA World Cup (which was also their first competitive match since 1945) the Dutch, despite being strong favourites, lost to the Germans which resulted in a national trauma which is poetically referred to as "De moeder aller nederlagen" ("The mother of all defeats") in Dutch. NOS sports commentator Herman Kuiphof's remark on air after the winning goal was scored – "We are fooled yet again" – became a catchphrase.

The loss of the 1974 final was a source of great bitterness among the Dutch and it would not be until 1988, when the Dutch beat the Germans in their own country and went on to become the new European Champions, that the public pressure on the Dutch team to be successful relaxed somewhat. The two competitive matches which would take place between 1974 and 1988 – in the group stages at the 1978 FIFA World Cup and UEFA Euro 1980 – were notoriously aggressive, and created a lot of pressure on both sides. The 1980 match would see Toni Schumacher and Huub Stevens fighting on field, whereas René van de Kerkhof would go on to punch Bernd Schuster in the eye.

The pressure was tremendous. The popular press was blowing up the old rivalry. We knew that on the pitch the Dutch were ready and waiting for us. We had to stay focused. I think it's a true shame and pity that they regard football (sic) as an outlet for their hatred from the Second World War.

— Karl-Heinz Rummenigge (b. 1955), German striker on the 1978 FIFA World Cup match

Before the game we knew that it was going to be tense. We had sworn to win, because that victory was so important to our sense of pride. To them, beating us is the best thing there is. They hate us so much more than we hate them.

— Karlheinz Förster (b. 1958), German midfielder on the UEFA Euro 1980 match

During the semi-final of UEFA Euro 1988, the Dutch defeated Germany (the host country) 2–1 with a goal by Marco van Basten in the last minute. After the game Ronald Koeman of the Dutch team pretended to wipe his backside with Olaf Thon's jersey, creating outrage in Germany.

The Dutch proceeded to win the final against the Soviet Union. When the team returned to the Netherlands and celebrated in the capital Amsterdam, Head coach Rinus Michels stood in front of the Dutch Royal Palace and said to the crowd: "We won the tournament, but we all know that the semi-final was the real final". The Netherlands exploded into a mass celebration. As the Dutch team returned home they were paraded through the canals of Amsterdam as people jumped in the water and swam towards the players to congratulate them.

I had been waiting for that moment for fourteen years. Before the game I remembered my feelings watching TV as a teenager, and that boosted up my anger. I am happy to have been able to give this gift to the older generation, the ones that lived through the War.

— Hans van Breukelen (b. 1956), Dutch goalkeeper on the UEFA Euro 1988 match

We gave joy to the older generation. I saw their emotions, their tears.

— Ruud Gullit (b. 1962), Dutch striker on the UEFA Euro 1988 match

Following the 1988 match, anti-German sentiment became much less prominent among the Dutch, as defeating the Germans and going on to win the cup, in Germany itself, was to many the closest they would ever come to repaying Germany. It also marked a new phase in the rivalry because with the war-related sentiment lessened on the Dutch side, the Germans now as a consequence also became far more vocal about the football rivalry, which they had avoided previously. The rivalry continued, but the tone (though still highly competitive) became less aggressive.

=== 1988–2012 ===
In 1990 both teams met again during the second round of the World Cup. This match is seen as the main catalyst for the modern rivalry, in which both Germany and the Netherlands enthusiastically participate. The teams had also met in the qualification round for this World Cup: 0–0 in Germany and 1–1 in The Netherlands.

Before kick-off, the Dutch supporters shouted down the Deutschlandlied with boos and the Germans replied by chanting "Deutschland! Deutschland!" during the playing of Het Wilhelmus. The game that followed was notable for its many fouls and other incidents. After Rudi Völler had been hacked down by Frank Rijkaard, who was subsequently booked, Rijkaard spat in Völler's hair. After the following free kick, Völler and the Dutch keeper Van Breukelen had contact, both trying to get the ball, and Van Breukelen and Rijkaard shouted at Völler and Rijkaard pulled Völler's hair. The referee sent both Rijkaard and Völler off, and Rijkaard spat in Völler's hair a second time when both players left the pitch. Germany won the match 2–1 and went on to win the tournament and become World Champions.

In 1992 the Dutch beat Germany 3–1 during the group stage of the European Championship. However, both teams progressed. The Netherlands would go on to lose the semi-finals against Denmark, who then defeated Germany in the final.

The next competitive match between the two nations came at UEFA Euro 2004 in Portugal. The result was a 1–1 draw, with the Netherlands progressing to the knockout stages and Germany failing to do so.

Their next competitive fixture was in the group stages of UEFA Euro 2012. The match assumed greater significance after the results of the first tranche of group matches were completed (Denmark defeating the Dutch and Germany defeating Portugal both by 1-0), since it was possible that a German win could eliminate the Dutch from the tournament, depending on the result of the other subsequent game in Group B (between Denmark and Portugal); although Portugal defeated Denmark 3-2 to keep both them and the Dutch alive, Germany vs Netherlands ended in a 2–1 victory to Germany, putting the Netherlands' progression from the group stage into significant doubt. They now needed to defeat Portugal by two goals and also needed Denmark to lose to Germany in order to progress into the quarterfinals. The Dutch were eliminated with no points after losing to Portugal in their last match; Germany lost in the semi-finals. After a friendly in Amsterdam in November 2012, the teams would not meet again for almost six years.

=== 2018–present ===
The stage was set for another chapter in the rivalry during the 2018–19 and the 2019–20 seasons, as the Netherlands and Germany were drawn together in a group for both the inaugural UEFA Nations League and the UEFA Euro 2020 qualifiers. The first of the two Nations League matches, in October 2018, was won 3–0 by the Dutch despite the Germans having the upper hand. In the return match in November 2018, Germany was already relegated (though that was later reversed due to an overhaul of the Nations League rules), and two late goals from Quincy Promes and Virgil van Dijk got the Netherlands a 2–2 draw, as a consequence securing the group win for the Dutch. In the Euro 2020 fixtures in March 2019, Germany bounced back by winning 2–3 in Amsterdam through a 90th minute goal from Nico Schulz; in September 2019, the Netherlands won convincingly by 2–4 in Hamburg, the first Dutch away win since 2002.

=== Overall balance and friendlies ===
Overall, the matches between both countries have been quite balanced in the past decades, including the latest friendlies. Since 1996 the friendly matches in The Netherlands resulted in one Dutch victory (2–1 in 2000), two draws (2–2 in 2005; 0–0 in 2012) and one defeat (0–1 in 1996). The friendly matches in Germany resulted in one Germany victory (3–0 in 2011), one draw (1–1 in 1998) and one Dutch victory (1–3 in 2002).

The teams were scheduled to play on 17 November 2015 in Hannover, but serious threats with connections to the Paris terror attacks which occurred during a Germany-France match, led German authorities to cancel the friendly. German authorities had evidence of a planned attack outside the stadium as well as in the Hannover Hauptbahnhof. The HDI-Arena was evacuated 2 hours before the match was scheduled to begin.

== Comparison in major tournaments ==
Key

Denotes which team finished better in that particular competition.
DNQ: Did not qualify.
DNP: Did not participate.
TBD: To be determined.

Tournament	Germany	Netherlands	Notes
1930 FIFA World Cup	DNP		
1934 FIFA World Cup	3rd	9th	
1938 FIFA World Cup	10th	14th	
1950 FIFA World Cup	DNP	DNP	
1954 FIFA World Cup	1st	DNP	
1958 FIFA World Cup	4th	DNQ	
Euro 1960	DNP	DNQ	
1962 FIFA World Cup	7th	DNQ	
Euro 1964	DNP	DNQ	
1966 FIFA World Cup	2nd	DNQ	
Euro 1968	DNQ	DNQ	
1970 FIFA World Cup	3rd	DNQ	
Euro 1972	1st	DNQ	
1974 FIFA World Cup	1st	2nd	Tournament hosted by West Germany. West Germany defeated the Netherlands 2-1 in the final.
Euro 1976	2nd	3rd	
1978 FIFA World Cup	6th	2nd	In the second round, the match ended 2–2.
Euro 1980	1st	5th	In the group stage, West Germany defeated the Netherlands 3–2.
1982 FIFA World Cup	2nd	DNQ	
Euro 1984	5th	DNQ	
1986 FIFA World Cup	2nd	DNQ	
Euro 1988	3rd	1st	Tournament hosted by West Germany. In the semifinals, the Netherlands defeated West Germany 2–1.
1990 FIFA World Cup	1st	15th	In the Round of 16, West Germany defeated the Netherlands 2-1.
Euro 1992	2nd	3rd	In the group stage, the Netherlands defeated Germany 3-1.
1994 FIFA World Cup	5th	7th	
Euro 1996	1st	8th	
1998 FIFA World Cup	7th	4th	
Euro 2000	15th	3rd	Tournament hosted jointly by the Netherlands and Belgium.
2002 FIFA World Cup	2nd	DNQ	
Euro 2004	12th	4th	In the group stage, the match ended 1-1.
2006 FIFA World Cup	3rd	11th	Tournament hosted by Germany.
Euro 2008	2nd	6th	
2010 FIFA World Cup	3rd	2nd	
Euro 2012	3rd	15th	In the group stage, Germany defeated the Netherlands 2-1.
2014 FIFA World Cup	1st	3rd	
Euro 2016	3rd	DNQ	
2018 FIFA World Cup	22nd	DNQ	
Euro 2020	15th	9th	Tournament hosted by multiple countries; Germany and the Netherlands some matches.
2022 FIFA World Cup	17th	5th	
Euro 2024	5th	3rd	Tournament hosted by Germany.
2026 FIFA World Cup	18th	17th	
Euro 2028	TBD	TBD	

== Major tournament matches ==
1974 FIFA World Cup
7 July 1974
16:00 CET (UTC+1)
Final

Netherlands	1–2	West Germany
Neeskens 2' (pen.)	Report	Breitner 25' (pen.); Müller 43'

Olympiastadion, Munich
Attendance: 78,200
Referee: Jack Taylor (England)

1978 FIFA World Cup
18 June 1978
16:45 ART (UTC−3)
Second round

West Germany	2–2	Netherlands
Abramczik 3'; D. Müller 70'	Report	Haan 27'; R. van de Kerkhof 84'

Estadio Olímpico Chateau Carreras, Córdoba
Attendance: 40,750
Referee: Ramón Barreto (Uruguay)

UEFA Euro 1980
14 June 1980
17:45 CEST (UTC+2)
Group stage

West Germany	3–2	Netherlands
Allofs 20', 60', 65'	Report	Rep 79' (pen.); W. van de Kerkhof 85'

Stadio San Paolo, Naples
Attendance: 26,546
Referee: Robert Wurtz (France)

UEFA Euro 1988
21 June 1988
20:15 CEST (UTC+2)
Semi-finals

West Germany	1–2	Netherlands
Matthäus 55' (pen.)	Report	R. Koeman 74' (pen.); Van Basten 88'

Volksparkstadion, Hamburg
Attendance: 61,330
Referee: Ioan Igna (Romania)

1990 FIFA World Cup
24 June 1990
21:00 CEST (UTC+2)
Round of 16

West Germany	2–1	Netherlands
Klinsmann 51'; Brehme 82'	Report	R. Koeman 89' (pen.)

San Siro, Milan
Attendance: 74,559
Referee: Juan Carlos Loustau (Argentina)

UEFA Euro 1992
18 June 1992
20:15 CEST (UTC+2)
Group stage

Netherlands	3–1	Germany
Rijkaard 4'; Witschge 15'; Bergkamp 72'	Report	Klinsmann 53'

Ullevi, Gothenburg
Attendance: 37,725
Referee: Pierluigi Pairetto (Italy)

UEFA Euro 2004
15 June 2004
19:45 WEST (UTC+1)
Group stage

Germany	1–1	Netherlands
Frings 30'	Report	Van Nistelrooy 81'

Estádio do Dragão, Porto
Attendance: 48,197
Referee: Anders Frisk (Sweden)

UEFA Euro 2012
13 June 2012
21:45 EEST (UTC+3)
Group stage

Netherlands	1–2	Germany
Van Persie 73'	Report	Gómez 24', 38'

Metalist Stadium, Kharkiv
Attendance: 37,750
Referee: Jonas Eriksson (Sweden)

=== Other competitive matches ===
1990 FIFA World Cup qualification
19 October 1988
Group stage

West Germany	0–0	Netherlands
	Report

Olympiastadion, Munich
Attendance: 73,000
Referee: Pietro D'Elia (Italy)

26 April 1989
Group stage

Netherlands	1–1	West Germany
Van Basten 88'	Report	Riedle 68'

De Kuip, Rotterdam
Attendance: 50,500
Referee: Erik Fredriksson (Sweden)

2018–19 UEFA Nations League
13 October 2018
20:45 CEST (UTC+2)
Group A1

Netherlands	3–0	Germany
Van Dijk 30'; Depay 87'; Wijnaldum 90+3'	Report

Johan Cruyff Arena, Amsterdam
Attendance: 52,536
Referee: Cüneyt Çakır (Turkey)

19 November 2018
20:45

Germany	2–2	Netherlands
Werner 9'; Sané 20'	Report	Promes 85'; Van Dijk 90+1'

Veltins-Arena, Gelsenkirchen
Referee: Ovidiu Hațegan (Romania)

UEFA Euro 2020 qualifying
24 March 2019
20:45
Group C

Netherlands	2–3	Germany
De Ligt 48'; Depay 63'	Report	Sané 15'; Gnabry 34'; Schulz 90'

Johan Cruyff Arena, Amsterdam
Attendance: 51,694
Referee: Jesús Gil Manzano (Spain)

6 September 2019
20:45
Group C

Germany	2–4	Netherlands
Gnabry 9'; Kroos 73'	Report	de Jong 59'; Tah 66' (o.g.); Malen 79'; Wijnaldum 90+1'

Volksparkstadion, Hamburg
Attendance: 51,299
Referee: Artur Soares Dias (Portugal)

2024–25 UEFA Nations League
10 September 2024
20:45

Netherlands	2–2	Germany
Reijnders 2'; Dumfries 50'	Report	Undav 38'; Kimmich 45+3'

Johan Cruyff Arena, Amsterdam
Attendance: 50,109
Referee: Davide Massa (Italy)

14 October 2024
20:45

Germany	1–0	Netherlands
Leweling 64'	Report

Allianz Arena, Munich
Attendance: 68,367
Referee: Slavko Vinčić (Slovenia)

2026–27 UEFA Nations League
24 September 2026
20:45

Netherlands	1–1	Germany
Gakpo 90+2'	Report	Nmecha 32'

Johan Cruyff Arena, Amsterdam
Referee: Alejandro Hernández Hernández (Spain)

16 November 2026
20:45

Germany	5–0	Netherlands
Scherhant 41'; Wirtz 60', 71'; Schlotterbeck 65'; Gruda 77'	Report

Olympiastadion, Berlin
Referee: Glenn Nyberg (Sweden)

== List of matches ==
Number	Date	Venue	Competition	Team 1	Result	Team 2
1	24 April 1910	(Netherlands) Arnhem	Friendly	Netherlands	4–2	Germany
2	16 October 1910	(Germany) Kleve	Friendly	Germany	1–2	Netherlands
3	24 March 1912	(Netherlands) Zwolle	Friendly	Netherlands	5–5	Germany
4	17 November 1912	(Germany) Leipzig	Friendly	Germany	2–3	Netherlands
5	5 April 1914	(Netherlands) Amsterdam	Friendly	Netherlands	4–4	Germany
6	10 May 1923	(Germany) Hamburg	Friendly	Germany	0–0	Netherlands
7	21 April 1924	(Netherlands) Amsterdam	Friendly	Netherlands	0–1	Germany
8	29 March 1925	(Netherlands) Amsterdam	Friendly	Netherlands	2–1	Germany
9	18 April 1926	(Germany) Düsseldorf	Friendly	Germany	4–2	Netherlands
10	31 October 1926	(Netherlands) Amsterdam	Friendly	Netherlands	2–3	Germany
11	20 November 1927	(Germany) Cologne	Friendly	Germany	2–2	Netherlands
12	26 April 1931	(Netherlands) Amsterdam	Friendly	Netherlands	1–1	Germany
13	4 December 1932	(Germany) Düsseldorf	Friendly	Germany	0–2	Netherlands
14	17 February 1935	(Netherlands) Amsterdam	Friendly	Netherlands	2–3	Germany
15	31 January 1937	(Germany) Düsseldorf	Friendly	Germany	2–2	Netherlands
16	14 March 1956	(West Germany) Düsseldorf	Friendly	West Germany	1–2	Netherlands
17	3 April 1957	(Netherlands) Amsterdam	Friendly	Netherlands	1–2	West Germany
18	21 October 1959	(West Germany) Cologne	Friendly	West Germany	7–0	Netherlands
19	23 March 1966	(Netherlands) Rotterdam	Friendly	Netherlands	2–4	West Germany
20	7 July 1974	(West Germany) Munich	1974 FIFA World Cup Final	West Germany	2–1	Netherlands
21	17 May 1975	(West Germany) Frankfurt	Friendly	West Germany	1–1	Netherlands
22	18 June 1978	(Argentina) Córdoba	1978 FIFA World Cup	Netherlands	2–2	West Germany
23	20 December 1978	(West Germany) Düsseldorf	Friendly	West Germany	3–1	Netherlands
24	14 June 1980	(Italy) Naples	UEFA Euro 1980	West Germany	3–2	Netherlands
25	11 October 1980	(Netherlands) Eindhoven	Friendly	Netherlands	1–1	West Germany
26	14 May 1986	(West Germany) Dortmund	Friendly	West Germany	3–1	Netherlands
27	21 June 1988	(West Germany) Hamburg	UEFA Euro 1988	West Germany	1–2	Netherlands
28	19 October 1988	(West Germany) Munich	1990 FIFA World Cup qualification	West Germany	0–0	Netherlands
29	26 April 1989	(Netherlands) Rotterdam	1990 FIFA World Cup qualification	Netherlands	1–1	West Germany
30	24 June 1990	(Italy) Milan	1990 FIFA World Cup	West Germany	2–1	Netherlands
31	18 June 1992	(Sweden) Gothenburg	UEFA Euro 1992	Germany	1–3	Netherlands
32	24 April 1996	(Netherlands) Rotterdam	Friendly	Netherlands	0–1	Germany
33	18 November 1998	(Germany) Gelsenkirchen	Friendly	Germany	1–1	Netherlands
34	23 February 2000	(Netherlands) Amsterdam	Friendly	Netherlands	2–1	Germany
35	20 November 2002	(Germany) Gelsenkirchen	Friendly	Germany	1–3	Netherlands
36	15 June 2004	(Portugal) Porto	UEFA Euro 2004	Germany	1–1	Netherlands
37	17 August 2005	(Netherlands) Rotterdam	Friendly	Netherlands	2–2	Germany
38	15 November 2011	(Germany) Hamburg	Friendly	Germany	3–0	Netherlands
39	13 June 2012	(Ukraine) Kharkiv	UEFA Euro 2012	Netherlands	1–2	Germany
40	14 November 2012	(Netherlands) Amsterdam	Friendly	Netherlands	0–0	Germany
41	13 October 2018	(Netherlands) Amsterdam	2018–19 UEFA Nations League	Netherlands	3–0	Germany
42	19 November 2018	(Germany) Gelsenkirchen	2018–19 UEFA Nations League	Germany	2–2	Netherlands
43	24 March 2019	(Netherlands) Amsterdam	UEFA Euro 2020 qualifying	Netherlands	2–3	Germany
44	6 September 2019	(Germany) Hamburg	UEFA Euro 2020 qualifying	Germany	2–4	Netherlands
45	29 March 2022	(Netherlands) Amsterdam	Friendly	Netherlands	1–1	Germany
46	26 March 2024	(Germany) Frankfurt	Friendly	Germany	2–1	Netherlands
47	10 September 2024	(Netherlands) Amsterdam	2024–25 UEFA Nations League	Netherlands	2–2	Germany
48	14 October 2024	(Germany) Munich	2024–25 UEFA Nations League	Germany	1–0	Netherlands
49	24 September 2026	(Netherlands) Amsterdam	2026–27 UEFA Nations League	Netherlands	1–1	Germany
50	16 November 2026	(Germany) Berlin	2026–27 UEFA Nations League	Germany	5–0	Netherlands

== Statistics ==
As of 16 November 2026

Competition	Matches	Wins		Draws	Goals	
Competition	Matches	Germany	Netherlands	Draws	Germany	Netherlands
FIFA World Cup	5	2	0	3	7	5
UEFA European Championship	7	3	3	1	13	15
UEFA Nations League	6	1	1	2	11	8
All competitions	18	7	4	7	31	28
Friendly	32	12	8	12	65	52
All matches	50	19	12	19	96	80

== In popular culture ==
=== Newspapers ===
After the Germany national team were eliminated from the 2010 FIFA World Cup, the German tabloid Bild suggested that Germans should now support the Dutch team (which they referred to as "Bundesrepublik Holland") because a number of Dutch players played for German clubs, mainly FC Bayern Munich. The article was subsequently picked up by several Dutch newspapers and was met with disdain and ridicule, De Telegraaf opening with "When lacking own talent ..." when discussing the Bild article.

=== Museums ===
The Dutch Voetbal Experience museum in Roosendaal has one of its 18 permanent exhibitions dedicated to the German-Dutch football rivalry, with tours available in Dutch, German and English. A Dutch poem on the 1974 defeat called 'De moeder aller nederlagen' can be found on the museum wall. The last line reads `Wij waren de beste, maar zij waren beter´ ('We were the best, but they were better').

=== Television ===
In the 2006 World Cup documentary Deutschland. Ein Sommermärchen, the early elimination of the Dutch team is illustrated by showing an Autobahn sign "Netherlands, exit right". In an episode of the Dutch history series Andere Tijden on the 1988 European Championship, which the Dutch won, a shot can be seen of an overpass near the Dutch-German border which reads, in German, "You are now entering the country of the European Champions". In a 2010 episode of Voetbal Inside, a Dutch football show, a clip is shown in which people are being interviewed on the streets and asked what they think the Dutch team should do in order to win the 2010 FIFA World Cup. After a while a (Dutch) man is shown who happily declares his "complete support" for the Germany national team, after which the clip stops and the presenters of the show are shown laughing uncontrollably.

=== Advertisements ===
During the 1990s and 2000s a lot of adverts appeared, at first on Dutch television later also on German networks, which referenced the Dutch-German football rivalry, including:

- A Sport Select ad, in which a Dutch couple in a caravan overtakes an elderly German woman, after which both cars start ramming each other.
- A Heineken ad, in which a mock press conference is given by a German official who presents earplugs as the 'ultimate weapon' against a string of Dutch fan noisemakers.
- A NUON ad, in which a Dutch fan accidentally spills his drink on a German fan, ruining his T-shirt. The Dutch fan then offers his own (black) shirt to the German as a compensation, which the German fan accepts. During the match the German is cheering violently, turning his shirt (being sensitive to body heat) orange.
- A History (Dutch paint brand) ad, in which a British 'wall whisperer' (Barrie Hall) concludes that the walls in the South African 2010 FIFA World Cup stadiums (all painted orange) are 'happy'. As he leaves it is revealed the room painted belongs to the Germany national team.
- A Sportwetten (German betting site) ad, in which a German and a Dutch fan walk past each other and the German fan spits in the Dutchmans hair. This was based on the notorious attack on Rudi Völler by Frank Rijkaard at the 1990 World Cup.
- In 2000, a Dutch TV commercial, in reference to the infamous spitting incident, shows Völler and Rijkaard both wearing bathrobes, having breakfast together, suggesting the taste of butter is so good it gets the world's most bitter rivals together. Rijkaard later declared in an interview that both he and Völler decided to be part of the commercial considering 10 years had passed since the incident and it was time to bury the hatchet.
- A Bosch ad, in which a German couple is overtaken by a car full of Dutch fans who mock him. The German keeps up with the Dutch car, but then suddenly breaks off. The Dutch fans celebrate only to be caught in a speed trap.
- A 2006 EA Games ad for a football computer game, in which (animated) Dutch players and fans are celebrating victory, followed by a dramatic voice from the off claiming: "Holland will win the World Cup... Only you can stop them!" After that, the German team is shown scoring against the Dutch.
- Also in 2006, in the wake of the World Cup being hosted by Germany, a commercial showed Oliver Kahn and Michael Ballack decorating a dressing room for the Brazil national team (poking fun at Germany's previous loss to Brazil in the final of the 2002 World Cup). At the end of the commercial, Ballack is seen holding a bouquet of orange tulips, reminding Kahn that they have yet to prepare the dressing room of the Netherlands national team. The commercial added a more friendly perspective on the football rivalry between both teams.

=== Music ===
A number of novelty songs have also been written, these include:

- "Wir sind die Holländer" by De Toppers. A 2006 song, sung partly in mock German.
- "Orange trägt nur die Müllabfuhr" by Mickie Krause. A 2008 song, the title of which means "only the garbage collector wears orange" in German, orange being the Netherlands national colour. Waste collectors in the largest cities of Germany (such as Berlin, Hamburg and Frankfurt) do typically wear fluorescent orange overalls. However the insult is largely lost in translation as in the Netherlands garbage men wear yellow. The song is based on the melody of the Song Go West.
- "Holland" by Joint Venture. A 2002 song, about a singer who likes the Netherlands, the Dutch, and Dutch culture except when it comes to football.
- "Ohne Holland fahr'n wir zur WM" by the German band Orange Buh. A 2002 song about the Netherlands not passing World-Cup qualification. The title means "We're driving to the World Cup without Holland".
- "Schade, Deutschland, alles ist vorbei," meaning "Pity, Germany, it's all over," sung by Dutch fans after the Dutch team had reached the quarterfinals at the expense of the Germans at Euro 2004. The song has also been sung by the fans of other national teams – for example, by Danish fans during their 2–0 defeat of Germany in the UEFA Euro 1992 Final.

== See also ==
- England–Germany football rivalry
- German football rivalries
- Germany–Italy football rivalry
- List of football rivalries by country
- Low Countries derby
- Willi Lippens

== Bibliography ==
- Hesse-Lichtenberger, Ulrich (Ulrich Hesse-Lichtenberger) (2003). Tor! The Story of German Football. WSC Books. ISBN 0-9540134-5-X.
- Schiweck, Ingo (2006). Kicken beim Feind? – Der ganz alltägliche Friede hinter dem deutsch-niederländischen Fußballkrieg. Düsseldorf: MaveriX. ISBN 978-3-9810957-4-6.
- Winner, David. Brilliant Orange.
- Houtum, Henk van; Frank van Dam (2002). "Topophilia or Topoporno? Patriotic Place Attachment in International Football Derbies". International Social Science Review. 3 (2): 231–248.
