= UEFA Euro 1980 qualifying Group 4 =

Football tournament qualification stage

Standings and results for Group 4 of the UEFA Euro 1980 qualifying tournament.

Group 4 consisted of Netherlands, Poland, East Germany, Switzerland, and Iceland. Group winners were Netherlands, who outran Poland by a single point.

== Final table ==
Pos	Team	Pld	W	D	L	GF	GA	GD	Pts	Qualification	(Netherlands)	(Poland)	(East Germany)	(Switzerland)	(Iceland)
1	Netherlands	8	6	1	1	20	6	+14	13	Qualify for final tournament	—	1–1	3–0	3–0	3–0
2	Poland	8	5	2	1	13	4	+9	12		2–0	—	1–1	2–0	2–0
3	East Germany	8	5	1	2	18	11	+7	11		2–3	2–1	—	5–2	3–1
4	Switzerland	8	2	0	6	7	18	−11	4		1–3	0–2	0–2	—	2–0
5	Iceland	8	0	0	8	2	21	−19	0		0–4	0–2	0–3	1–2	—

Source: UEFA
Rules for classification: Qualification tiebreakers

== Results ==
6 September 1978

Iceland	0–2	Poland
		Kusto 24'; Lato 85'

Laugardalsvöllur, Reykjavík
Attendance: 6,594
Referee: Thomas Perry (Northern Ireland)

20 September 1978

Netherlands	3–0	Iceland
Krol 31'; Brandts 53'; Rensenbrink 63' (pen.)

De Goffert, Nijmegen
Attendance: 13,113
Referee: Anders Mattsson (Finland)

4 October 1978

East Germany	3–1	Iceland
Peter 6'; Riediger 29'; Hoffmann 72'		Pétursson 14' (pen.)

Kurt-Wabbel-Stadion, Halle
Attendance: 9,084
Referee: Thomas Henry Charles Reynolds (Wales)

11 October 1978

Switzerland	1–3	Netherlands
Tanner 32'		Wildschut 19'; Brandts 67'; Geels 90'

Wankdorf Stadium, Bern
Attendance: 20,732
Referee: César Correia Diaz da Luz (Portugal)

15 November 1978

Netherlands	3–0	East Germany
Kische 18' (o.g.); Geels 72' (pen.), 88'

De Kuip, Rotterdam
Attendance: 33,972
Referee: Ulf Eriksson (Sweden)
15 November 1978

Poland	2–0	Switzerland
Boniek 39'; Ogaza 56'

Olimpijski, Wrocław
Attendance: 27,576
Referee: Franz Wöhrer (Austria)

28 March 1979

Netherlands	3–0	Switzerland
Kist 55'; Metgod 84'; Peters 89'

Philips Stadion, Eindhoven
Attendance: 21,674
Referee: John Hunting (England)

18 April 1979

East Germany	2–1	Poland
Streich 59'; Lindemann 63'		Boniek 9'

Zentralstadion, Leipzig
Attendance: 45,254
Referee: Eldar Azimzade (Soviet Union)

2 May 1979

Poland	2–0	Netherlands
Boniek 19'; Mazur 64' (pen.)

Silesian Stadium, Chorzów
Attendance: 71,298
Referee: Robert Wurtz (France)

5 May 1979

Switzerland	0–2	East Germany
		Lindemann 45'; Streich 90'

Espenmoos, St. Gallen
Attendance: 7,486
Referee: Augusto Lamo Castillo (Spain)

22 May 1979

Switzerland	2–0	Iceland
Herbert Hermann 27'; Zappa 53'

Wankdorf Stadium, Bern
Attendance: 20,234
Referee: Albert Victor (Luxembourg)

9 June 1979

Iceland	1–2	Switzerland
Guðlaugsson 49'		Ponte 59'; Heinz Hermann 61'

Laugardalsvöllur, Reykjavík
Attendance: 10,469
Referee: Edward A. Farrell (Republic of Ireland)

5 September 1979

Iceland	0–4	Netherlands
		Metgod 48'; W. van de Kerkhof 71'; Nanninga 73', 87'

Laugardalsvöllur, Reykjavík
Attendance: 10,375
Referee: Clive Thomas (Wales)

12 September 1979

Iceland	0–3	East Germany
		Weber 66' (pen.), 73'; Streich 80'

Laugardalsvöllur, Reykjavík
Attendance: 9,162
Referee: Svein Inge Thime (Norway)
12 September 1979

Switzerland	0–2	Poland
		Terlecki 34', 63'

Stade Olympique de la Pontaise, Lausanne
Attendance: 22,363
Referee: Otto Anderco (Romania)

26 September 1979

Poland	1–1	East Germany
Wieczorek 77'		Häfner 62'

Silesian Stadium, Chorzów
Attendance: 63,938
Referee: Pat Partridge (England)

10 October 1979

Poland	2–0	Iceland
Ogaza 55', 74' (pen.)

Stadion Miejski, Kraków
Attendance: 13,352
Referee: Henning Lund-Sørensen (Denmark)

13 October 1979

East Germany	5–2	Switzerland
Weber 1'; Hoffmann 11', 75', 80'; Schnuphase 26'		Barberis 19'; Pfister 72'

Stadion der Weltjugend, East Berlin
Attendance: 32,406
Referee: Robert Wurtz (France)

17 October 1979

Netherlands	1–1	Poland
Stevens 65'		Rudy 4'

Olympisch, Amsterdam
Attendance: 45,049
Referee: Paolo Casarin (Italy)

21 November 1979

East Germany	2–3	Netherlands
Schnuphase 17'; Streich 33' (pen.)		Thijssen 45'; Kist 50'; W. van de Kerkhof 67'

Zentralstadion, Leipzig
Attendance: 89,297
Referee: António da Silva Garrido (Portugal)

== Goalscorers ==
There were 60 goals scored in 20 matches, for an average of 3 goals per match.

4 goals

- (East Germany national football team) Martin Hoffmann
- (East Germany national football team) Joachim Streich

3 goals

- (East Germany national football team) Gerd Weber
- (Netherlands national football team) Ruud Geels
- (Poland national football team) Zbigniew Boniek
- (Poland national football team) Roman Ogaza

2 goals

- (East Germany national football team) Lutz Lindemann
- (East Germany national football team) Rüdiger Schnuphase
- (Netherlands national football team) Ernie Brandts
- (Netherlands national football team) Kees Kist
- (Netherlands national football team) John Metgod
- (Netherlands national football team) Dick Nanninga
- (Netherlands national football team) Willy van de Kerkhof
- (Poland national football team) Stanisław Terlecki

1 goal

- (East Germany national football team) Reinhard Häfner
- (East Germany national football team) Werner Peter
- (East Germany national football team) Hans-Jürgen Riediger
- (Iceland national football team) Janus Guðlaugsson
- (Iceland national football team) Pétur Pétursson
- (Netherlands national football team) Ruud Krol
- (Netherlands national football team) Jan Peters
- (Netherlands national football team) Rob Rensenbrink
- (Netherlands national football team) Huub Stevens
- (Netherlands national football team) Frans Thijssen
- (Netherlands national football team) Piet Wildschut
- (Poland national football team) Marek Kusto
- (Poland national football team) Grzegorz Lato
- (Poland national football team) Włodzimierz Mazur
- (Poland national football team) Wojciech Rudy
- (Poland national football team) Henryk Wieczorek
- (Switzerland national football team) Umberto Barberis
- (Switzerland national football team) Heinz Hermann
- (Switzerland national football team) Herbert Hermann
- (Switzerland national football team) Hans-Jörg Pfister
- (Switzerland national football team) Raimondo Ponte
- (Switzerland national football team) Markus Tanner
- (Switzerland national football team) Gian-Pietro Zappa

1 own goal

- (East Germany national football team) Gerd Kische (against Netherlands)
