= Austria v West Germany =

Austria v West Germany may refer to:

- Austria v West Germany (1978 FIFA World Cup), also known as the Miracle of Córdoba
- West Germany v Austria (1982 FIFA World Cup), also known as the Disgrace of Gijón
