= Football at the 1976 Summer Olympics =

1976 Men's Olympic Football Tournament
Tournament details
- Host country: Canada
- Dates: 18–31 July 1976
- Teams: 13 (from 4 confederations)
- Venues: 4 (in 4 host cities)

Final positions
- Champions: East Germany (1st title)
- Runners-up: Poland
- Third place: Soviet Union
- Fourth place: Brazil

Tournament statistics
- Matches played: 23
- Goals scored: 66 (2.87 per match)
- Attendance: 597,574 (25,981 per match)
- Top scorer: (Poland) Andrzej Szarmach (6 goals)

The football tournament at the 1976 Summer Olympics started on 18 July and ended on 31 July. 13 teams participated in the tournament, while three African teams withdrew in support of the anti-racism boycott. East Germany won gold by beating Poland 3-1 in the final and the Soviet Union took bronze.

== Venues ==
Montreal	Ottawa	Sherbrooke	Toronto
Olympic Stadium	Lansdowne Park	Sherbrooke Stadium	Varsity Stadium
Capacity: 72,406	Capacity: 30,065	Capacity: 10,000	Capacity: 21,739

== Qualification ==
The following 13 teams qualified for the 1976 Olympics football tournament:

- Africa (CAF)
  - Ghana (withdrew)
  - Nigeria (withdrew)
  - Zambia (withdrew)
- Asia (AFC)
  - Iran
  - Israel
  - North Korea
- North and Central America (CONCACAF)
  - Cuba (replaced Uruguay)
  - Guatemala
  - Mexico
- South America (CONMEBOL)
  - Brazil
  - Uruguay (withdrew)
- Europe (UEFA)
  - East Germany
  - France
  - Poland (automatically qualified as 1972 olympic champions)
  - Spain
  - Soviet Union
- Hosting nation
  - Canada

== Match officials ==
Asia

- (Israel) Abraham Klein
- (Iran) Jafar Namdar

North and Central America

- (Canada) Peter Thomas Johnson
- (Canada) Werner Winsemann
- (Mexico) Marco Antonio Dorantes

South America

- (Argentina) Ángel Coerezza
- (Brazil) Arnaldo Cézar Coelho
- (Colombia) Guillermo Velásquez
- (Uruguay) Ramón Barreto

Europe

- (Austria) Paul Schiller
- (France) Robert Héliès
- (Italy) Alberto Michelotti
- (East Germany) Adolf Prokop
- (Hungary) Károly Palotai
- (Poland) Marian Kuston
- (United Kingdom) John Paterson
- (Spain) Emilio Guruceta Muro
- (Soviet Union) Vladimir Rudnev

== Final tournament ==
=== First round ===
==== Group A ====
Team	Pld	W	D	L	GF	GA	GD	Pts
Brazil	2	1	1	0	2	1	+1	3
East Germany	2	1	1	0	1	0	+1	3
Spain	2	0	0	2	1	3	−2	0
Nigeria (Note: Withdrew)	0	—	—	—	—	—	—	0

Source: FIFA
Notes:
18 July 1976
12:00

Brazil	0–0	East Germany
	Report

Varsity Stadium, Toronto
Attendance: 21,643
Referee: John Paterson (Great Britain)

20 July 1976
12:00

Brazil	2–1	Spain
Rosemiro 7'; Chico Fraga 47' (pen.)	Report	Idígoras 14'

Olympic Stadium, Montreal
Attendance: 38,123
Referee: Paul Schiller (Austria)

22 July 1976
12:00

East Germany	1–0	Spain
Dörner 46'	Report

Olympic Stadium, Montreal
Attendance: 36,198
Referee: Werner Winsemann (Canada)

==== Group B ====
Team	Pld	W	D	L	GF	GA	GD	Pts
France	3	2	1	0	9	3	+6	5
Israel	3	0	3	0	3	3	0	3
Mexico	3	0	2	1	4	7	−3	2
Guatemala	3	0	2	1	2	5	−3	2

Source: FIFA
19 July 1976
12:00

Israel	0–0	Guatemala
	Report

Varsity Stadium, Toronto
Attendance: 9,500
Referee: Vladimir Rudnev (Soviet Union)

19 July 1976
12:00

France	4–1	Mexico
Schaer 14'; Baronchelli 33'; Rubio 78'; Amisse 90'	Report	Sánchez 81'

Lansdowne Park, Ottawa
Attendance: 14,286
Referee: Ángel Coerezza (Argentina)

21 July 1976
12:00

France	4–1	Guatemala
Platini 7', 86'; Amisse 41'; Schaer 82'	Report	Fion 58'

Municipal Stadium, Sherbrooke
Attendance: 3,163
Referee: Jafar Namdar (Iran)

21 July 1976
12:00

Mexico	2–2	Israel
Rangel 19', 44'	Report	Oz 51'; Shum 55' (pen.)

Olympic Stadium, Montreal
Attendance: 36,569
Referee: Alberto Michelotti (Italy)

23 July 1976
12:00

Mexico	1–1	Guatemala
Rangel 36'	Report	Rergis 18' (o.g.)

Municipal Stadium, Sherbrooke
Attendance: 4,118
Referee: Marian Kuston (Poland)

23 July 1976
12:00

France	1–1	Israel
Platini 80' (pen.)	Report	Peretz 75'

Olympic Stadium, Montreal
Attendance: 33,639
Referee: Ramón Barreto (Uruguay)

==== Group C ====
Team	Pld	W	D	L	GF	GA	GD	Pts
Poland	2	1	1	0	3	2	+1	3
Iran	2	1	0	1	3	3	0	2
Cuba	2	0	1	1	0	1	−1	1
Ghana (Note: Withdrew)	0	—	—	—	—	—	—	0

Source: FIFA
Notes:
18 July 1976
12:00

Poland	0–0	Cuba
	Report

Olympic Stadium, Montreal
Attendance: 29,417
Referee: Abraham Klein (Israel)

20 July 1976
12:00

Iran	1–0	Cuba
Mazloumi 28'	Report

Lansdowne Park, Ottawa
Attendance: 11,324
Referee: Adolf Prokop (East Germany)

22 July 1976
12:00

Poland	3–2	Iran
Szarmach 48', 75'; Deyna 51'	Report	Parvin 6'; Rowshan 79'

Olympic Stadium, Montreal
Attendance: 32,309
Referee: Arnaldo Cézar Coelho (Brazil)

==== Group D ====
Team	Pld	W	D	L	GF	GA	GD	Pts
Soviet Union	2	2	0	0	5	1	+4	4
North Korea	2	1	0	1	3	4	−1	2
Canada (H)	2	0	0	2	2	5	−3	0
Zambia (Note: Withdrew)	0	—	—	—	—	—	—	0

Source: FIFA
(H) Hosts
Notes:
19 July 1976
12:00

Canada	1–2	Soviet Union
Douglas 88'	Report	Onyshchenko 8', 11'

Olympic Stadium, Montreal
Attendance: 34,320
Referee: Robert Héliès (France)

21 July 1976
12:00

North Korea	3–1	Canada
An Se-uk 18'; Hong Song-nam 66', 80'	Report	Douglas 51'

Varsity Stadium, Toronto
Attendance: 12,638
Referee: Marco Antonio Dorantes (Mexico)

23 July 1976
12:00

Soviet Union	3–0 (Note: North Korean player An Gil-wan was suspended for a year for attacking the referee three times during the game. The International Olympic Committee issued a warning to the entire North Korean team threatening to impose a blanket ban on the delegation.)	North Korea
Kolotov 16' (pen.); Veremeyev 81'; Blokhin 89'	Report

Lansdowne Park, Ottawa
Attendance: 15,233
Referee: Emilio Guruceta Muro (Spain)

=== Bracket ===
Quarter-finals
25 July – Ottawa
East Germany	4
France	0
25 July – Sherbrooke
Soviet Union	2
Iran	1
25 July – Toronto
Brazil	4
Israel	1
25 July – Montreal
Poland	5
North Korea	0

Semi-finals
27 July – Montreal
East Germany	2
Soviet Union	1
27 July – Toronto
Brazil	0
Poland	2

Final
31 July – Montreal
East Germany	3
Poland	1
Bronze medal match
29 July – Montreal
Soviet Union	2
Brazil	0

=== Quarter-finals ===
25 July 1976
12:00

East Germany	4–0	France
Löwe 27'; Dörner 60' (pen.), 68' (pen.); Riediger 77'	Report

Lansdowne Park, Ottawa
Attendance: 20,083
Referee: Alberto Michelotti (Italy)

25 July 1976
12:00

Soviet Union	2–1	Iran
Minayev 40'; Zvyahintsev 67'	Report	Ghelichkhani 82' (pen.)

Municipal Stadium, Sherbrooke
Attendance: 5,855
Referee: Guillermo Velasquez (Colombia)

25 July 1976
12:00

Brazil	4–1	Israel
Jarbas 56', 74'; Erivélto 72'; Léo Júnior 88'	Report	Peretz 80'

Varsity Stadium, Toronto
Attendance: 18,601
Referee: Károly Palotai (Hungary)

25 July 1976
12:00

Poland	5–0	North Korea
Szarmach 13', 49'; Lato 59', 79'; Szymanowski 64'	Report

Olympic Stadium, Montreal
Attendance: 46,885
Referee: Paul Schiller Austria)

=== Semi-finals ===
27 July 1976
12:00

Soviet Union	1–2	East Germany
Kolotov 84' (pen.)	Report	Dörner 59' (pen.); Kurbjuweit 66'

Olympic Stadium, Montreal
Attendance: 57,182
Referee: Marco Antonio Dorantes (Mexico)

27 July 1976
12:00

Poland	2–0	Brazil
Szarmach 51', 82'	Report

Varsity Stadium, Toronto
Attendance: 21,743
Referee: John Paterson (Great Britain)

=== Bronze medal match ===
29 July 1976
21:00

Soviet Union	2–0	Brazil
Onyshchenko 5'; Nazarenko 49'	Report

Olympic Stadium, Montreal
Attendance: 55,647
Referee: Abraham Klein (Israel)

=== Gold medal match ===
1976 Summer Olympics Football final
31 July 1976
21:30

East Germany	3–1	Poland
Schade 7'; Hoffmann 14'; Häfner 84'	Report	Lato 59'

Olympic Stadium, Montreal
Attendance: 71,617
Referee: Ramón Barreto (Uruguay)

Team details

East Germany

GK	1	Jürgen Croy
DF	6	Reinhard Lauck
DF	4	Konrad Weise
DF	3	Hans-Jürgen Dörner
DF	5	Lothar Kurbjuweit
MF	12	Gerd Kische
MF	14	Hartmut Schade	(yellow card) 44'
MF	9	Hans-Jürgen Riediger		(substituted off) 86'
FW	8	Reinhard Häfner
FW	13	Wolfram Löwe		(substituted off) 68'
FW	11	Martin Hoffmann
Substitutes:
MF	10	Bernd Bransch		(substituted on) 86'
DF	17	Wilfried Gröbner		(substituted on) 68'
Manager:
(East Germany) Georg Buschner

Poland

GK	1	Jan Tomaszewski	(substituted off) 19'
DF	2	Antoni Szymanowski
DF	14	Henryk Wieczorek
DF	5	Władysław Żmuda
DF	13	Henryk Wawrowski
MF	6	Zygmunt Maszczyk
MF	9	Kazimierz Deyna
MF	8	Henryk Kasperczak
FW	7	Grzegorz Lato
FW	10	Andrzej Szarmach
FW	11	Kazimierz Kmiecik
Substitutes:
GK	12	Piotr Mowlik	(substituted on) 19'
Manager:
(Poland) Kazimierz Górski

== Medal winners ==
East Germany – Gold

Hans-Ulrich Grapenthin
Wilfried Gröbner
Jürgen Croy
Gerd Weber
Hans-Jürgen Dörner
Konrad Weise
Lothar Kurbjuweit
Reinhard Lauck
Gert Heidler
Reinhard Häfner
Hans-Jürgen Riediger
Bernd Bransch
Martin Hoffmann
Gerd Kische
Wolfram Löwe
Hartmut Schade
Dieter Riedel

Coach: Georg Buschner

Poland – Silver

Jan Tomaszewski
Piotr Mowlik
Antoni Szymanowski
Jerzy Gorgoń
Wojciech Rudy
Władysław Żmuda
Zygmunt Maszczyk
Grzegorz Lato
Henryk Wawrowski
Henryk Kasperczak
Roman Ogaza
Kazimierz Kmiecik
Kazimierz Deyna
Andrzej Szarmach
Henryk Wieczorek
Lesław Ćmikiewicz
Jan Benigier

Coach: Kazimierz Górski

Soviet Union – Bronze

Vladimir Astapovsky
Anatoliy Konkov
Viktor Matviyenko
Mykhaylo Fomenko
Stefan Reshko
Volodymyr Troshkin
David Kipiani
Volodymyr Onyshchenko
Viktor Kolotov
Volodymyr Veremeyev
Oleh Blokhin
Leonid Buryak
Vladimir Fyodorov
Aleksandr Minayev
Viktor Zvyahintsev
Leonid Nazarenko
Aleksandr Prokhorov

Coach: Valeriy Lobanovskyi

== Goalscorers ==
With six goals, Andrzej Szarmach of Poland is the top scorer in the tournament. In total, 66 goals were scored by 44 different players, with only one of them credited as an own goal.

6 goals

- (Poland) Andrzej Szarmach

4 goals

- (East Germany) Hans-Jürgen Dörner

3 goals

- (France) Michel Platini
- (Mexico) Víctor Rangel
- (Poland) Grzegorz Lato
- (Soviet Union) Volodymyr Onyshchenko

2 goals

- (Brazil) Jarbas
- (Canada) Jimmy Douglas
- (France) Jean-Marc Schaer
- (France) Loïc Amisse
- (Israel) Vicky Peretz
- (North Korea) Hong Song-Nam
- (Soviet Union) Viktor Kolotov

1 goal

- (Brazil) Chico Fraga
- (Brazil) Erivélto
- (Brazil) Léo Júnior
- (Brazil) Rosemiro
- (East Germany) Hans-Jürgen Riediger
- (East Germany) Hartmut Schade
- (East Germany) Lothar Kurbjuweit
- (East Germany) Martin Hoffmann
- (East Germany) Reinhard Häfner
- (East Germany) Wolfram Löwe
- (France) Bruno Baronchelli
- (France) Francisco Rubio
- (Guatemala) Marco Fion
- (Iran) Ali Parvin
- (Iran) Gholam Hossein Mazloumi
- (Iran) Hassan Rowshan
- (Iran) Parviz Ghelichkhani
- (Israel) Itzhak Shum
- (Israel) Yaron Oz
- (Mexico) Hugo Sánchez
- (North Korea) An Se-Uk
- (Poland) Antoni Szymanowski
- (Poland) Kazimierz Deyna
- (Soviet Union) Aleksandr Minayev
- (Soviet Union) Leonid Nazarenko
- (Soviet Union) Oleh Blokhin
- (Soviet Union) Viktor Zvyahintsev
- (Soviet Union) Volodymyr Veremeyev
- (Spain) Santiago Idígoras

Own goal

- (Mexico) Eduardo Rergis (playing against Guatemala)

== Final ranking ==
Pos	Team	Pld	W	D	L	GF	GA	GD	Pts
1	East Germany	5	4	1	0	10	2	+8	9
2	Poland	5	3	1	1	11	5	+6	7
3	Soviet Union	5	4	0	1	10	4	+6	8
4	Brazil	5	2	1	2	6	6	0	5
5	France	4	2	1	1	9	7	+2	5
6	Israel	4	0	3	1	4	7	−3	3
7	Iran	3	1	0	2	4	5	−1	2
8	North Korea	3	1	0	2	3	9	−6	2
9	Mexico	3	0	2	1	4	7	−3	2
10	Guatemala	3	0	2	1	2	5	−3	2
11	Cuba	2	0	1	1	0	1	−1	1
12	Spain	2	0	0	2	1	3	−2	0
13	Canada	2	0	0	2	2	5	−3	0

Source: rsssf.com
