= Viktor Zvyahintsev =

Soviet footballer (1950–2022)

- Zvyahintsev in 2012

Personal information
- Full name: Viktor Oleksandrovych Zvyahintsev
- Date of birth: 22 October 1950
- Place of birth: Stalino, Ukrainian SSR, Soviet Union
- Date of death: 22 April 2022 (aged 71)
- Place of death: Donetsk, Ukraine (Russian-occupied Ukraine)
- Height: 1.79 m (5 ft 10 in)
- Position: Defender

Youth career
- Shakhtar Donetsk

Senior career*
Years	Team	Apps	(Gls)
1968–1970	Shakhtar Donetsk	12	(0)
1971	SKA Kyiv	42	(0)
1972	CSKA Moscow	26	(0)
1973–1975	Shakhtar Donetsk	72	(0)
1976	Dynamo Kyiv	5	(0)
1977–1980	Shakhtar Donetsk	63	(0)
1981	Metalurh Zaporizhzhia	0	(0)
1981	Tavriya Simferopol	33	(0)

International career
1975–1976	USSR	13	(1)
- * Club domestic league appearances and goals

Olympic medal record

Representing Soviet Union

Men's Football
Bronze medal – third place	1976 Montreal	Team competition

UEFA European U-23 Championships
Runner-up	1972 Europe	

Viktor Oleksandrovych Zvyahintsev (Ukrainian: Віктор Олександрович Звягінцев, Russian: Виктор Александрович Звягинцев, romanized: Viktor Aleksandrovich Zvyagintsev; 22 October 1950 – 22 April 2022) was a Ukrainian footballer who played as a defender. He was a member of the football congress of the unrecognised Donetsk People's Republic.

== International career ==
Zvyahintsev made his debut for USSR on 12 October 1975 in a UEFA Euro 1976 qualifier against Switzerland (USSR did not qualify for the final tournament).

== Personal life ==
His son-in-law is a football player and coach Viktor Onopko.

== Honours ==
Shakhtar Donetsk

- Soviet Cup: 1980

USSR

- Olympic bronze: 1976
