= Ernie Brandts =

Dutch footballer (born 1956)

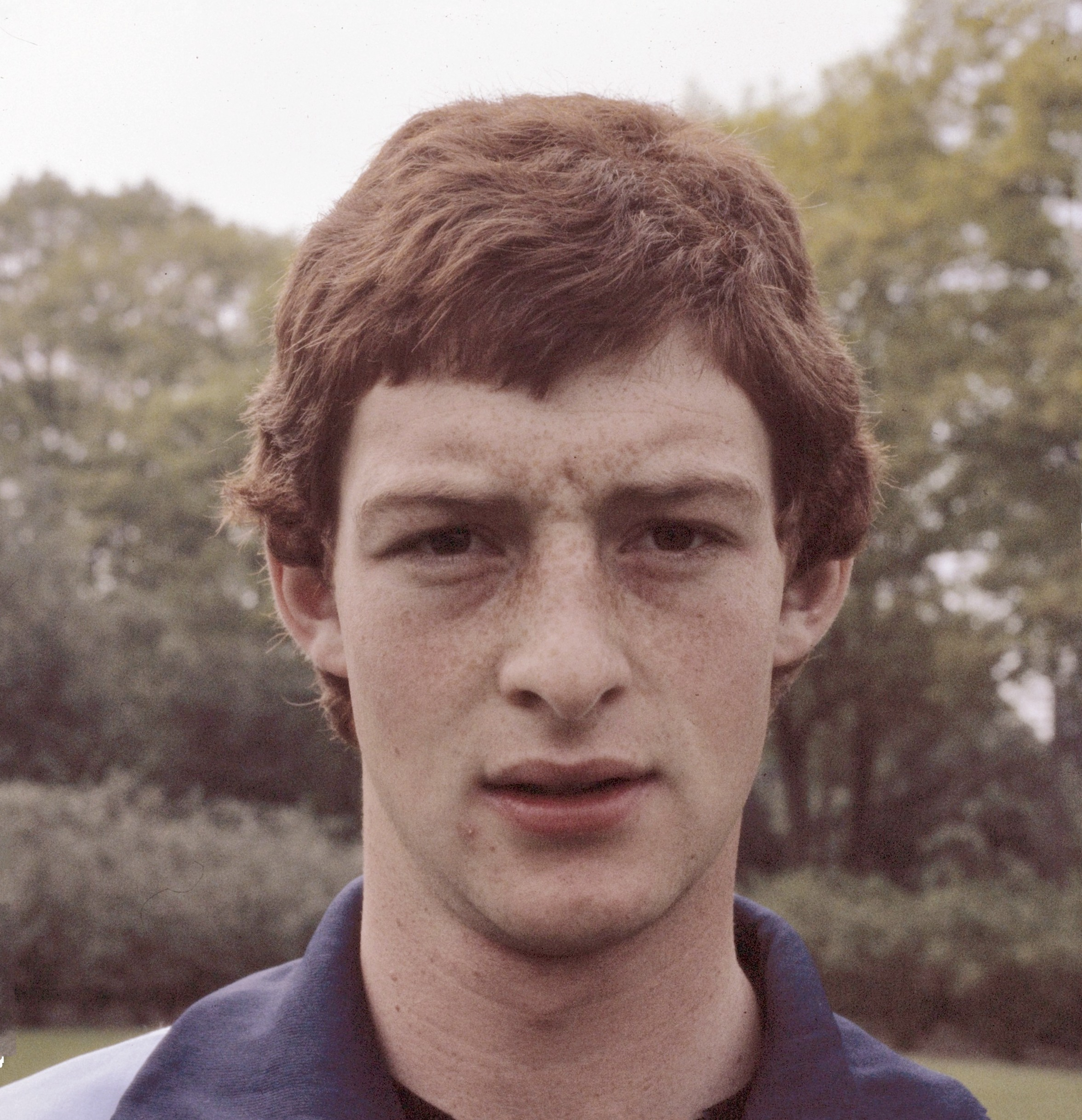
- Brandts in 1978

Personal information
- Full name: Ernstus Wilhelmus Johannes Brandts
- Date of birth: 3 February 1956 (age 70)
- Place of birth: Didam, Netherlands
- Height: 1.87 m (6 ft 2 in)
- Position: Defender

Youth career
- De Sprinkhanen

Senior career*
Years	Team	Apps	(Gls)
1974–1977	De Graafschap	38	(2)
1977–1986	PSV	251	(23)
1986–1989	Roda JC	68	(4)
1988–1989	MVV	16	(0)
1989–1991	Germinal Ekeren	59	(5)
1991–1992	De Graafschap	20	(0)
Total		452	(34)

International career
1977–1985	Netherlands	28	(5)

Managerial career
- 1993–2002: PSV (assistant)
- 2002–2004: RKSV Nuenen
- 2005–2006: FC Volendam
- 2006–2008: NAC
- 2009: Rah Ahan
- 2010–2012: APR
- 2012–2013: Young Africans
- 2014–2015: FC Dordrecht
- 2015–2016: RKVV DIA
- 2016–2017: N.E.C. (assistant)
- 2018–2019: FC Eindhoven (assistant)
- 2019–2021: FC Eindhoven
Medal record
Representing Netherlands
FIFA World Cup
Runner-up	1978 Argentina
- * Club domestic league appearances and goals

Ernstus Wilhelmus Johannes "Ernie" Brandts (born 3 February 1956 in Didam) is a Dutch football manager and former player.

== Playing career ==
=== Club ===
Born in Didam, he played for local club De Sprinkhanen before joining De Graafschap at 17. After three seasons he moved on to PSV with whom he won two Eredivisie league titles in seven seasons. He later played for Roda JC, MVV and Belgian side Germinal Ekeren before returning to his first professional club De Graafschap.

=== International ===
Brandts earned 28 caps and scored five goals for the Netherlands national team and played in the 1978 FIFA World Cup. In a second-round match against Italy, he became the first player to score goals for both teams in the same match in the World Cup Final Tournament. He scored an own goal in the 18th minute, and then scored the equalizer for the Netherlands in the 50th minute. His teammate Arie Haan eventually scored the winning goal, giving the Netherlands a 2–1 win.

== Coaching career ==
Brandts began as an assistant manager at PSV, and has managed FC Volendam and NAC Breda as well as clubs in Iran and Africa.

Halfway through the 2007–08 season, Brandts was informed that his contract as head trainer of NAC would not be extended, despite the best results (third position in 2007–08 Eredivisie) NAC Breda had seen for a long time. This decision was not taken lightly by the NAC Breda supporters - despite all the complaints the NAC top directors went ahead with their plan. Brandts was replaced by Robert Maaskant at the beginning of the 2008–09 season.

He was appointed as the coach of Iranian side Rah Ahan in summer of 2009 and he was appointed coach of Rwandan army club APR in 2010 and achieved the double. In 2012–13 he was coach of Young Africans and won all the cups. On 25 December 2013, he left the club with a mutual consent agree by both parties.

He returned to the Netherlands and started as head coach of FC Dordrecht in June 2014, but after a decent start of their Eredivisie campaign Brandts decided with agreement of the club to stop in February 2015. Brandts was named assistant manager at N.E.C. in 2016.

== Career statistics ==
=== International ===
Appearances and goals by national team and year
National team	Year	Apps	Goals
Netherlands	1977	1	0
Netherlands	1978	8	4
Netherlands	1979	7	0
Netherlands	1980	5	1
Netherlands	1981	2	0
Netherlands	1982	0	0
Netherlands	1983	0	0
Netherlands	1984	2	0
Netherlands	1985	3	0
Total		28	5

Scores and results list the Netherlands' goal tally first, score column indicates score after each Brandts goal.

List of international goals scored by Ernie Brandts
No.	Date	Venue	Opponent	Score	Result	Competition
1	14 June 1978	Estadio Córdoba, Córdoba, Argentina	Austria	1–0	5–1	1978 FIFA World Cup
2	21 June 1978	Estadio Monumental, Buenos Aires, Argentina	Italy	1–1	2–1	1978 FIFA World Cup
3	20 September 1978	Goffertstadion, Nijmegen, Netherlands	Iceland	2–0	3–0	UEFA Euro 1980 qualification
4	11 October 1978	Wankdorfstadion, Bern, Switzerland	Switzerland	2–1	3–1	UEFA Euro 1980 qualification
5	11 October 1980	Philips Stadion, Eindhoven, Netherlands	West Germany	1–1	1–1	Friendly

During the 1978 FIFA World Cup, Brandts made an own goal in the match against Italy.

== Honours ==
PSV Eindhoven

- Eredivisie: 1977–78, 1985–86
- UEFA Cup: 1977–78

Netherlands

- FIFA World Cup runner-up: 1978

Individual

- Onze Mondial: 1978, 1979
