= Henryk Wieczorek =

Polish footballer

Personal information
- Full name: Henryk Piotr Wieczorek
- Date of birth: 14 December 1949 (age 76)
- Place of birth: Chorzów, Poland
- Height: 1.82 m (5 ft 11 1/2 in)
- Position: Midfielder

Youth career
- 1962–1968: Stadion Śląski Chorzów

Senior career*
| Years | Team | Apps | (Gls) |
| 1968–1973 | ROW Rybnik | | |
| 1973–1980 | Górnik Zabrze | 155 | (10) |
| 1980–1982 | Auxerre | 61 | (0) |
| 1982–1986 | US Melunaise | | |

International career
| 1973–1979 | Poland | 17 | (2) |

Managerial career
- 1990: Olimpia Poznań
- 1991–1993: Szombierki Bytom
- 1994–1995: Urania Ruda Śląska
Medal record
Men's football
Representing Poland
FIFA World Cup
| Third place | 1974 West Germany |
Olympic Games
| Silver medal – second place | 1976 Montreal | Team |
- * Club domestic league appearances and goals

Henryk Piotr Wieczorek (born 14 December 1949) is a Polish former professional footballer who played as a midfielder. He played for a few clubs, including ROW Rybnik, Górnik Zabrze, as well as AJ Auxerre and US Melunaise in France.

He played for the Poland national team (18 matches) and was a participant at the 1974 FIFA World Cup, where Poland won the bronze medal and at the 1976 Summer Olympics where Poland won the silver medal. Wieczorek later coached several Polish clubs.

== Career statistics ==
=== International goals ===
| # | Date | Venue | Opponent | Score | Result | Competition |
|---|---|---|---|---|---|---|
| 1. | 19 August 1979 | Stadion 650-lecia, Słupsk, Poland | Libya | 5–0 | 5–0 | Friendly |
| 2. | 26 September 1979 | Stadion Śląski, Chorzów, Poland | East Germany | 1–1 | 1–1 | UEFA Euro 1980 qualifying |
Correct as of 7 October 2015

== Honours ==
Poland

- Olympic silver medal: 1976
- FIFA World Cup third place: 1974
