= Martin Hoffmann (footballer) =

German footballer and manager

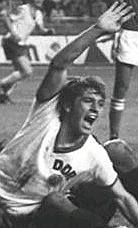
- Hoffmann in 1974

Personal information
- Date of birth: 22 March 1955 (age 71)
- Place of birth: Gommern, Bezirk Magdeburg, East Germany
- Height: 1.69 m (5 ft 6 1/2 in)
- Position: Striker

Youth career
- 1961–1968: BSG Aktivist Gommern
- 1968–1972: 1. FC Magdeburg

Senior career*
Years	Team	Apps	(Gls)
1972–1985	1. FC Magdeburg	256	(78)

International career
1973–1981	East Germany	62	(15)

Managerial career
- 1988–1993: 1. FC Magdeburg; (youth team and assistant)
- 1994–1996: 1. FC Magdeburg
- 1996–1997: Parchimer FC
- 2002–2003: 1. FC Magdeburg
- 2007–2013: 1. FC Magdeburg U19
Medal record
Representing East Germany
Men's Football
Gold medal – first place	1976 Montreal	Team competition
- * Club domestic league appearances and goals

Martin Hoffmann (born 22 March 1955 in Gommern) is a former German footballer and manager.

== Career ==
=== Playing career ===
Hoffmann played from 1973 to 1985 for 1. FC Magdeburg in the East German top division, amassing 256 matches and scoring 78 goals. With Magdeburg, he won the league title in 1974 and 1975, and the cup title in 1978, 1979 and 1983. The biggest title of all is the European Cup Winners' Cup, as Magdeburg defeated AC Milan 2–0 on 8 May 1974 in Rotterdam.

He also played for the East Germany national football team, making 62 appearances and scoring 15 goals between 1973 and 1981. In 1974, he played in six matches for East Germany in the 1974 FIFA World Cup, scoring once against Chile. In 1976, he was in the East German team which won the gold medal in the 1976 Summer Olympics in Montreal, playing in 5 matches and scoring once in the final against Poland.

=== Coaching career ===
He worked as manager of 1. FC Magdeburg in the twice, from 1994 to 1996 and from 2002 to 2003. In the 1996–97 season, he briefly managed Mecklenburg-based Parchimer FC, but left the club in the winterbreak.

== Honours ==
- European Cup Winners' Cup: 1
  - Winner 1974
- DDR-Oberliga: 2
  - Winner 1974, 1975
  - Runner-up 1977, 1978
- FDGB-Pokal: 3
  - Winner 1978, 1979, 1983
- Olympic football tournament: 1
  - Gold medal Montreal 1976

== International goals ==
No.	Date	Venue	Opponent	Score	Result	Competition
1.	18 June 1974	West Berlin, West Germany	Chile	1–0	1–1	1974 FIFA World Cup
2.	25 September 1974	Prague, Czechoslovakia	Czechoslovakia	1–?	1–3	Friendly
3.	9 October 1974	Frankfurt (Oder), East Germany	Canada	1–0	2–0	Friendly
4.	12 October 1974	Magdeburg, East Germany	Iceland	1–0	1–1	UEFA Euro 1976 qualifying
5.	24 September 1977	Vienna, Austria	Austria	1–1	1–1	1978 FIFA World Cup qualification
6.	29 October 1977	Babelsberg, East Germany	Malta	1–0	9–0	1978 FIFA World Cup qualification
7.	29 October 1977	Babelsberg, East Germany	Malta	3–0	9–0	1978 FIFA World Cup qualification
8.	29 October 1977	Babelsberg, East Germany	Malta	9–0	9–0	1978 FIFA World Cup qualification
9.	16 November 1977	İzmir, Turkey	Turkey	2–0	2–1	1978 FIFA World Cup qualification
10.	8 March 1978	Chemnitz, East Germany	Switzerland	2–?	3–1	Friendly
11.	8 March 1978	Chemnitz, East Germany	Switzerland	3–?	3–1	Friendly
12.	4 October 1978	Halle, East Germany	Iceland	3–1	3–1	UEFA Euro 1980 qualifying
13.	13 October 1979	East Berlin, East Germany	Switzerland	2–0	5–2	UEFA Euro 1980 qualifying
14.	13 October 1979	East Berlin, East Germany	Switzerland	4–2	5–2	UEFA Euro 1980 qualifying
15.	13 October 1979	East Berlin, East Germany	Switzerland	5–2	5–2	UEFA Euro 1980 qualifying
