= Municipal Stadium (Sherbrooke) =

Stadium in Sherbrooke, Quebec, Canada

Coordinates: 45°24′43″N 71°52′55″W

Municipal Stadium is a multi-purpose stadium in Sherbrooke, Quebec, Canada. It hosted three soccer games during the 1976 Summer Olympics. It is currently used mostly for football and it holds 4,000 people.
