= Lutz Lindemann =

German footballer

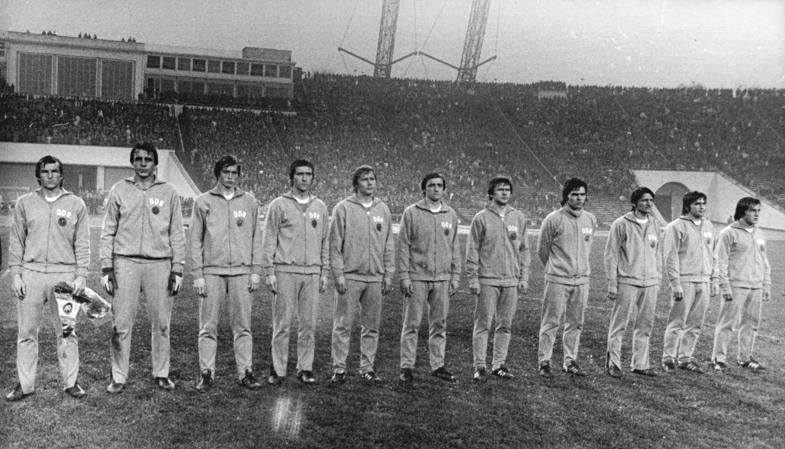
- Lutz Lindemann (middle) with the East German team in 1978

Personal information
- Date of birth: 13 July 1949 (age 77)
- Place of birth: Halberstadt, East Germany
- Height: 1.76 m (5 ft 9 in)
- Positions: Defender; midfielder

Youth career
- 1958–1965: Aufbau/Empor Halberstadt
- 1965–1967: SC (Aufbau) / 1. FC Magdeburg

Senior career*
Years	Team	Apps	(Gls)
1969–1970	BFC Dynamo II	8	(0)
1970–1971	Motor Nordhausen	21	(9)
1971–1977	FC Rot-Weiß Erfurt	134	(42)
1977–1981	FC Carl Zeiss Jena	90	(14)

International career
1974–1975	East Germany U-23	5	(1)
1977	East Germany U-21	3	(0)
1977–1980	East Germany	21	(2)

Managerial career
- 1982–1983: Motor Hermsdorf
- 1983–1989: Fortschritt Weida
- 1992–1995: Erzgebirge Aue
- 1996–1998: Erzgebirge Aue
- 2004–2005: Hallescher FC
- 2016–2017: FC Prishtina
- * Club domestic league appearances and goals

Lutz Lindemann (born 13 July 1949) is a German professional football coach and former player. In the top division of East German football, the DDR-Oberliga, he played for FC Rot-Weiß Erfurt and FC Carl Zeiss Jena. After his football career, the former GDR international was, among other things, a coach at FC Erzgebirge Aue and club president at FC Carl Zeiss Jena.

== Club career ==
Lutz Lindemann played in his youth at Aufbau/Empor Halberstadt and the 1. FC Magdeburg. In 1967, after a move from Magdeburg to BSG Stahl Eisenhüttenstadt was not permitted, he went back to his hometown and there to BSG Lokomotiv Halberstadt. In 1970, he moved to Motor Nordhausen and finally came to FC Rot-Weiß Erfurt in 1971. There he played until 1977, until he moved to the Thuringian rival FC Carl Zeiss Jena, where he played until his career in 1981 and celebrated his greatest successes. Among them was the FDGB Cup victory in 1980 in the final against his old club from Erfurt.

In the DDR Oberliga, Lindemann played 205 games, scoring 42 goals. With Carl Zeiss, he reached the 1981 European Cup Winners' Cup Final, where the Thuringian team lost in the Rheinstadion in Düsseldorf with 1–2 against Dinamo Tbilisi. He scored 23 times in 50 games in the GDR league and 7 times in 21 games in the European Cup.

== International career ==
On 7 September 1977, he made his debut in the football national team of the GDR at the 1–0 defeat against Scotland in Berlin. Three years later he finished his last international match against Spain with draw (0-0). In total, he won 21 for East Germany and scored two goals.

== Career statistics ==
=== International ===
Appearances and goals by national team and year
National team	Year	Apps	Goals
East Germany	1977	4	0
East Germany	1978	5	0
East Germany	1979	9	2
East Germany	1980	3	0
Total		21	2

Scores and results list East Germany's goal tally first, score column indicates score after each Lindemann goal.

List of international goals scored by Lutz Lindemann
No.	Date	Venue	Opponent	Score	Result	Competition
1	18 April 1979	Zentralstadion, Leipzig, East Germany	Poland	2–1	2–1	UEFA Euro 1980 qualification
2	5 May 1979	Espenmoos, St. Gallen, Switzerland	Switzerland	1–0	2–0	UEFA Euro 1980 qualification

== Selection inserts ==
As a member of the newly founded 1. FC Magdeburg, Lindemann completed four international matches with the DFV U-18 team in 1966. He was not nominated for the GDR squad of his year, which was eliminated in the preliminary round of the UEFA youth tournament in Turkey in spring 1967. In the 1970s, when the U-21s and U-23s sometimes played in parallel, the midfielder, who was now active at FC Rot-Weiß Erfurt, was called up in eight matches for the GDR youth team.

On 7 September 1977, he made his senior debut for the GDR national team in a 1-0 win against Scotland in East Berlin. Three years later he played his last international match against Spain (0-0) in Leipzig. Overall, he played 21 international matches for the senior team, scoring two goals.

== Further career ==
=== Positions as coach and manager ===
After his playing career, Lutz Lindemann began a coaching career. His first stop was in 1982/83 with the GDR league promoted Motor Hermsdorf. There he did not manage to stay up and switched to the 1983/84 season for the GDR league newcomer progress Weida. Lindemann was also immediately relegated with Weida, but was able to continue working with the team and led them back into the GDR league in 1987. In July 1989 he went back to Jena, where he took over the position of team manager. From 1992 to 1995, Lindemann was a coach at FC Erzgebirge Aue and then manager at the Violets. After Ralf Minge was kicked out, he also took over the coaching post in Aue again from April 1996 to June 1998. From July 1998 to 2003, Lindemann was almost exclusively active as a manager - briefly accompanied by a position as assistant coach under Holger Erler in spring 1999 - at FC Erzgebirge Aue. From 2004 to 2006, Lindemann was manager at Hallescher FC and was also coach there for a period of seven months.

Since 28 January 2007, Lindemann has served as sporting director in Jena. However, he had to give up this post on 22 December 2007, as he was responsible for FC Carl Zeiss' poor table situation at the end of the first half of the 2007/08 season. From January to June 2008, Lindemann worked as chief scout for FC Carl Zeiss Jena. On 1 July 2008, the club separated from him.

On 24 September 2009, Lindemann was introduced as a "board member with responsibility for youth work" at the NRW league team Sportfreunde Siegen. From 29 October 2009, Lindemann was responsible for the entire sporting area of Sportfreunde, on 29 March 2010 he also temporarily took over the post of chairman of the board. After four years in Siegerland, he ended his work there in the summer of 2013. For the 2013/14 season he became sporting director of the regional league team FC Viktoria 1889 Berlin. On 4 April 2014, Lindemann was confirmed as the new president of FC Carl Zeiss Jena. On 1 March 2016, Lindemann announced his resignation as managing director of FC Carl Zeiss Jena Fußball Spielbetriebs GmbH, and he also resigned from the position of sporting director.

In July 2016, Lindemann became sports director of the Kosovan first division club KF Prishtina. He also took over as manager of the Vala Superleague of Kosovo club in January 2017 before Ahmet Beselica succeeded him as Prishtina coach in August 2017. Lindemann remained sports director.

== Television career ==
Since July 2018, Lindemann has been an expert for the 3rd football league and the Northeast regional league for Sport im Osten on Mitteldeutscher Rundfunk.

== Writing ==
Passionate optimist. My life. (Autobiography with Frank Willmann) Construction Berlin, 2019, ISBN 978-3-351-03744-4.

== Literature ==
- Deutsches Sportecho: years 1977-1981. ISSN 0323-8628
- Andreas Baingo, Michael Hohlfeld: Fußball-Auswahlspieler der DDR. Das Lexikon, Sportverlag Berlin, Berlin 2000, ISBN 3-328-00875-6, page 101/102.
- Andreas Baingo, Michael Horn: Die Geschichte der DDR-Oberliga, Verlag Die Werkstatt, Göttingen 2004, ISBN 3-89533-428-6, page 321.
- Michael Horn, Gottfried Weise: Das große Lexikon des DDR-Fußballs, Schwarzkopf & Schwarzkopf, Berlin 2004, ISBN 3-89602-536-8, page 217/218.
- Hanns Leske: Enzyklopädie des DDR-Fußballs Verlag Die Werkstatt, Göttingen 2007, ISBN 978-3-89533-556-3, page 296.
