= Henryk Wawrowski =

Polish footballer

Personal information
- Date of birth: 25 September 1949 (age 77)
- Place of birth: Szczecin, Poland
- Height: 1.72 m (5 ft 7 1/2 in)
- Position: Defender

Senior career*
Years	Team	Apps	(Gls)
1968–1970	Arkonia Szczecin		
1970–1971	Gwardia Warsaw	22	(3)
1972–1979	Pogoń Szczecin	185	(7)
1979–1980	Iraklis	24	(1)
1981–1982	Arkonia Szczecin		
1983	Esbjerg fB	26	(2)

International career
1974–1978	Poland	25	(0)
1976	Poland Olympic	5	(0)
Medal record
Men's football
Representing Poland
FIFA World Cup
Bronze medal – third place	1982 Spain
Olympic Games
Silver medal – second place	1976 Montréal	Team
- * Club domestic league appearances and goals

Henryk Wawrowski (born 25 September 1949) is a Polish former professional footballer who played as a defender. He spent most of his career playing for Polish clubs, with short stints in Greece in Denmark as well.

== International career ==
Wawrowski played 25 times for his home country, and he won the silver medal with the Polish Olympic team at the 1976 Summer Olympics, at which he featured in all five games of Poland.

== Honours ==
Poland

- Olympic silver medal: 1976
