= 1978 FIFA World Cup qualification – UEFA Group 3 =

Football tournament qualification stage

Group 3 consisted of four of the 32 teams entered into the European zone: Austria, East Germany, Malta, and Turkey. These four teams competed on a home-and-away basis for one of the 8.5 spots in the final tournament allocated to the European zone. The spot would be assigned to the group's winner.

== Standings ==
Pos	Team	Pld	W	D	L	GF	GA	GD	Pts
1	Austria	6	4	2	0	14	2	+12	10
2	East Germany	6	3	3	0	15	4	+11	9
3	Turkey	6	2	1	3	9	5	+4	5
4	Malta	6	0	0	6	0	27	−27	0

== Matches ==
31 October 1976

Turkey	4 – 0	Malta
Mehmet 22'; Cemil 54', 57', 75'	Report

Izmir, Turkey
Referee: Jursa (Czechoslovakia)

17 November 1976

East Germany	1 – 1	Turkey
Kotte 3' (pen.)	Report	Cemil 31' (pen.)

Dresden, East Germany
Referee: Partridge (England)

5 December 1976

Malta	0 – 1	Austria
	Report	Krankl 57'

Valletta, Malta
Referee: Seouidi (Tunisia)

2 April 1977

Malta	0 – 1	East Germany
	Report	Streich 55'

Valletta, Malta
Referee: Delia Bruna (Switzerland)

17 April 1977

Austria	1 – 0	Turkey
Schachner 43'	Report

Vienna, Austria
Referee: Viktor Zharkov (Soviet Union)

30 April 1977

Austria	9 – 0	Malta
Krankl 9', 12', 18', 20', 53', 66'; Stering 30', 69'; Pirkner 65'	Report

Salzburg, Austria
Referee: Jarguz (Poland)

24 September 1977

Austria	1 – 1	East Germany
Kreuz 9'	Report	Hoffmann 40'

Vienna, Austria
Referee: Reynolds (Wales)

12 October 1977

East Germany	1 – 1	Austria
Löwe 50'	Report	Hattenberger 43'

Leipzig, East Germany
Referee: Foote (Scotland)

29 October 1977

East Germany	9 – 0	Malta
Hoffman 2', 44', 84'; Schade 38'; Sparwasser 52'; Weber 56'; Streich 63' (pen.), 79', 82'	Report

Babelsberg, East Germany
Referee: Namdar (Iran)

30 October 1977

Turkey	0 – 1	Austria
	Report	Prohaska 72'

Izmir, Turkey
Referee: Gordon (Scotland)

16 November 1977

Turkey	1 – 2	East Germany
Volkan 81'	Report	Schade 30'; Hoffmann 62'

Izmir, Turkey
Referee: Michelotti (Italy)

27 November 1977

Malta	0 – 3	Turkey
	Report	Sedat 21', 48'; Cemil 36'

Gżira, Malta
Referee: Larache (Morocco)
