= Jean-Marc Schaer =

French footballer (born 1953)

Personal information
- Date of birth: 1 January 1953 (age 73)
- Place of birth: Dunières, France
- Position: Striker

Youth career
- –1971: Dunières
- 1971–1975: Saint-Étienne

Senior career*
Years	Team	Apps	(Gls)
1975–1977	Saint-Étienne		
1977–1981	Auxerre	132	(47)
1981–1982	Nice		
1982–1984	Valenciennes		
1984–1985	Sète		
- Moulins
- * Club domestic league appearances and goals

Jean-Marc Schaer (born 1 January 1953) is a French retired professional football striker.
