= Janus Guðlaugsson =

Icelandic footballer and coach

Personal information
- Full name: Janus Friðrik Guðlaugsson
- Date of birth: 7 October 1955 (age 71)
- Place of birth: Iceland
- Position: Midfielder

Senior career*
Years	Team	Apps	(Gls)
1975–1979	FH		
1979–1985	SC Fortuna Köln	130	(19)
1985	FH Hafnarfjörður		
1985–1986	FC Lugano		
1986–1988	Fram		
1988	FH		

International career
1977–1985	Iceland	34	(2)

Managerial career
- 1992: FH Hafnarfjörður
- 1993: KR
- 1994: Reynir Sandgerði
- 2007–2010: Álftanes
- * Club domestic league appearances and goals

Janus Guðlaugsson (born 7 October 1955) is an Icelandic former professional football player and football coach. He played for FH Hafnarfjörður from 1975 to 1979. During that period he was a member of the Iceland national football team. He spent six years playing as a professional footballer in the German Bundesliga for SC Fortuna Köln.

He came home again in summer 1985 to play for Fram Reykjavik, and stayed with that club until 1986. He then later returned to FH Hafnarfjörður. Around 1999–2003 he was coach of the Icelandic lower division team Álftanes, and since 2003 he became involved with Haukar, assisting with coaching both professionals and youth players and passing on his football experience.

== Academic career ==
After his sports career, Janus studied sport education and received a PhD degree from University of Iceland in 2014 with a thesis entitled Multimodal Training Intervention: An Approach to Successful Aging.
