= Erich Obermayer =

Austrian footballer

Personal information
- Full name: Erich Obermayer
- Date of birth: 23 January 1953 (age 73)
- Place of birth: Vienna, Austria
- Height: 1.82 m (6 ft 0 in)
- Position: Defender

Youth career
- FC Wien
- 1969–1971: Austria Wien

Senior career*
Years	Team	Apps	(Gls)
1971–1989	Austria Wien	544	(15)

International career
1975–1985	Austria	50	(1)

Managerial career
- 2000–2001: Floridsdorfer AC
- 2004–2005: 1. Simmeringer SC
- 2013: FCM Traiskirchen
- * Club domestic league appearances and goals

Erich Obermayer (born 23 January 1953, in Wien) is a former Austrian football player.

== Club career ==
Obermayer came aged 16 from FC Wien and played 20 years for Austria Wien. He was chosen in Austria's Team of the Century in 2001.

== International career ==
He made his debut for Austria in an April 1975 European Championship qualification match against Hungary and was a participant at the 1978 FIFA World Cup, where he scored a goal in a match against the Netherlands, and 1982 FIFA World Cup where he skippered the team. He earned 50 caps, scoring one goal. His last international was a March 1985 friendly match against the Soviet Union.
