= Franz Oberacher =

Austrian footballer

Personal information
- Date of birth: 24 March 1954 (age 72)
- Place of birth: Natters, Austria
- Height: 1.75 m (5 ft 9 in)
- Position: Striker

Senior career*
| Years | Team | Apps | (Gls) |
| 1974–1979 | Wacker Innsbruck | 139 | (29) |
| 1979–1981 | 1. FC Nürnberg | 56 | (21) |
| 1981–1982 | AZ | 26 | (5) |
| 1982–1987 | Austria Klagenfurt | 92 | (20) |
| Total | | 313 | (75) |

International career
| 1976–1985 | Austria | 8 | (1) |
- * Club domestic league appearances and goals

Franz Oberacher (born 24 March 1954) is a former international Austrian footballer.
