= Heinrich Strasser =

Austrian footballer

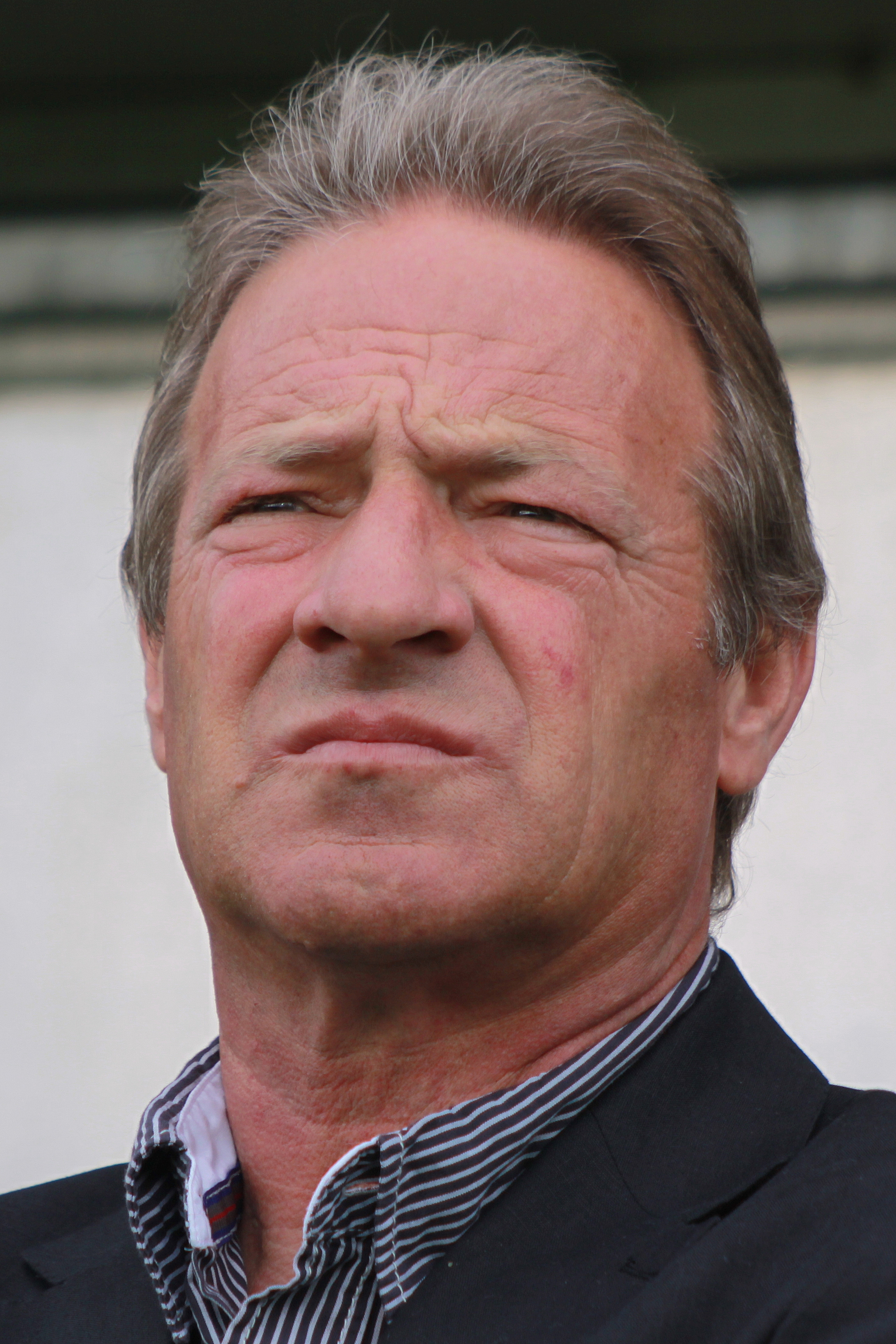
- Strasser in 2009

Personal information
- Date of birth: 26 October 1948 (age 78)
- Place of birth: Vienna, Austria
- Height: 5 ft 8 in (1.73 m)
- Position: Defender

Senior career*
Years	Team	Apps	(Gls)
1966–1968	SC Wacker Wien	-	(-)
1968–1973	FC Admira	-	(-)
1973–1979	FC Admira/Wacker	163	(14)
1979–1982	First Vienna FC 1894	24	(0)
1982–1984	1. Simmering SC	26	(1)
1984–1985	First Vienna FC 1894	27	(4)
Total		240	(19)

International career
1969–1979	Austria	26	(0)

Managerial career
- 2000–2002: Admira Wacker Mödling (assistant)
- 2008–2009: LASK Linz (assistant)
- 2012–2013: USC Perchtoldsdorf
- * Club domestic league appearances and goals

Heinrich Strasser (born 26 October 1948) is an Austrian former professional footballer who played as a defender. He represented Austria at the 1978 FIFA World Cup. He also played for FC Admira Wacker Mödling and First Vienna FC.

== Achievements ==
- 1 × Austrian Cup
- Participation at the 1978 FIFA World Cup: 7th place
- 26 International Caps for the Austria national football team
