= Piet Wildschut =

Dutch footballer

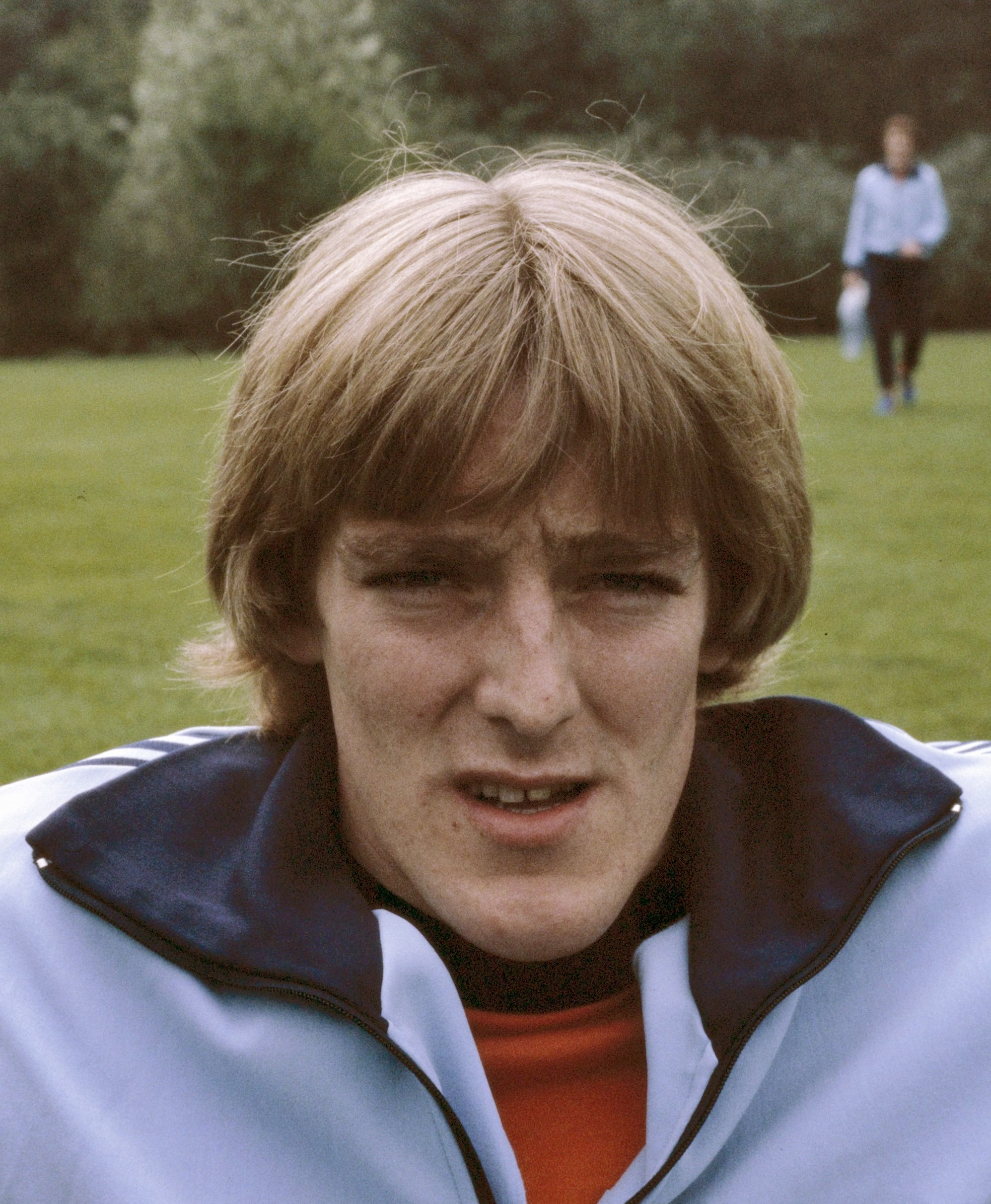
- Wildschut in 1978

Personal information
- Full name: Pieter Wildschut
- Date of birth: 25 October 1957 (age 69)
- Place of birth: Leeuwarden, Netherlands
- Position: Defender

Senior career*
| Years | Team | Apps | (Gls) |
| 1974–1976 | FC Groningen | 39 | (6) |
| 1976–1978 | FC Twente | 64 | (8) |
| 1979–1985 | PSV Eindhoven | 180 | (9) |
| 1985–1986 | Royal Antwerp | 28 | (2) |
| 1986–1988 | Roda JC | 35 | (3) |
| Total | | 346 | (28) |

International career
| 1978–1982 | Netherlands | 11 | (1) |
Medal record
Representing Netherlands
FIFA World Cup
| Runner-up | 1978 Argentina |
- * Club domestic league appearances and goals

Pieter "Piet" Wildschut (Dutch pronunciation: [ˈpitər pit ˈʋɪltsxʏt]; born 25 October 1957) is a Dutch former professional footballer who played as a defender. He obtained 11 international caps for the Netherlands national team.

== Career ==
Wildschut was born in Leeuwarden, Friesland. After starting his career for FC Groningen, he represented his native country at the 1978 FIFA World Cup, where Holland finished runners-up, as a player of FC Twente. Later on Wildschut moved to PSV Eindhoven. He studied Mathematics at Eindhoven University of Technology. After his soccer career, Wildschut and his family moved to the United States where he runs a software company.
