= Arie Haan =

Dutch football player and manager

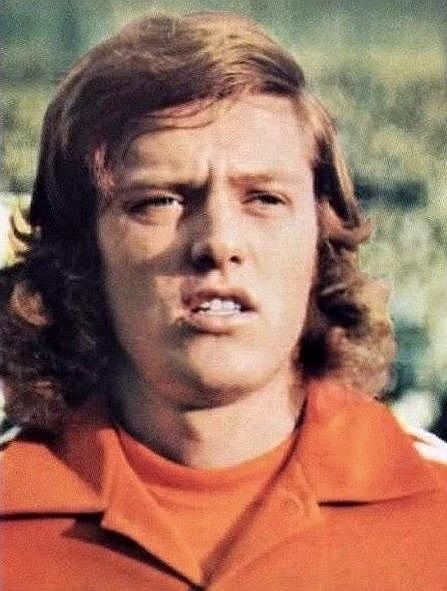
- Haan in 1974

Personal information
- Full name: Arend Haan
- Date of birth: 16 November 1948 (age 77)
- Place of birth: Finsterwolde, Netherlands
- Height: 1.83 m (6 ft 0 in)
- Position: Midfielder

Senior career*
Years	Team	Apps	(Gls)
1967–1975	Ajax	132	(23)
1975–1981	Anderlecht	199	(35)
1981–1983	Standard Liège	65	(12)
1983–1984	PSV	18	(0)
1984–1985	Seiko	5	(1)
Total		419	(71)

International career
1972–1980	Netherlands	35	(6)

Managerial career
- 1984–1985: Royal Antwerp
- 1986–1987: Anderlecht
- 1987–1990: Stuttgart
- 1990–1991: Nürnberg
- 1991–1993: Standard Liège
- 1994–1995: PAOK
- 1995–1997: Feyenoord
- 1997–1998: Anderlecht
- 1999: PAOK
- 2000: Omonia
- 2001: Austria Vienna
- 2002–2004: China PR
- 2006: Persepolis
- 2006–2007: Cameroon
- 2008–2009: Albania
- 2009: Chongqing Lifan
- 2010–2011: Tianjin Teda
- 2012: Shenyang Shenbei
- 2014–2015: Tianjin Teda
Medal record
Men's football
Representing Netherlands (as player)
FIFA World Cup
Runner-up	1974
Runner-up	1978
Representing China (as manager)
AFC Asian Cup
Runner-up	2004
- * Club domestic league appearances and goals

Arend "Arie" Haan (Dutch pronunciation: [ˈaːrɛnt ˈaːri ˈɦaːn]; born 16 November 1948) is a Dutch football manager and former player who played as a midfielder. He scored 6 goals in 35 matches for the Netherlands national team of the 1970s. At club level, he enjoyed a successful career with AFC Ajax, R.S.C. Anderlecht, Standard Liège and PSV Eindhoven.

He participated in seven finals of European club competitions with five victories and two defeats. He was also known for his goals from long distance. At international level, he played 35 times for the Netherlands national team and was on the losing side for them in two World Cup finals.

After retiring as a player, he managed numerous club sides in Europe and China, as well as the national teams of China, Cameroon and Albania. He retired as manager in April 2016.

== Playing career ==
Haan joined AFC Ajax in 1967, making his debut in a friendly match against Cambuur on 3 August 1967; his official debut followed on 23 May 1968. He was a member of the Ajax squad which went on to win the European Cup for three consecutive years, from 1971 until 1973, the Intercontinental Cup in 1972 and two European Super Cups, in 1972 and 1973. Also with Ajax, he won three Eredivisie titles in 1969–70, 1971–72 and 1972–73 and the Dutch Cup from 1970 until 1972. In 1970, his team won the Double and in 1972, the Treble.

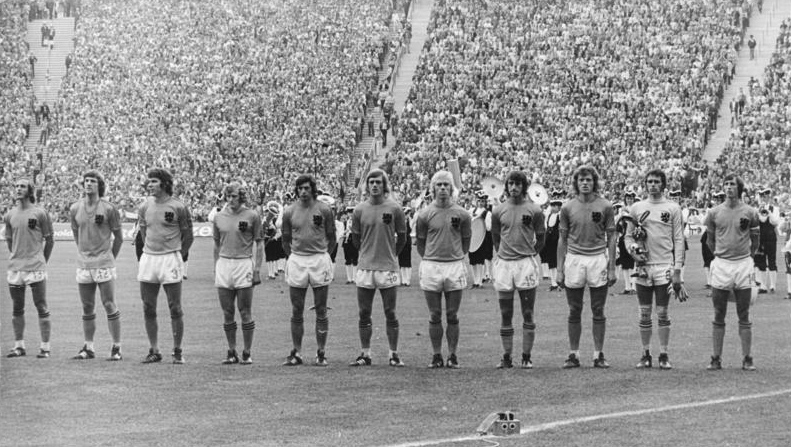
Haan (third from right) with the Netherlands national team in 1974

He joined Belgian club R.S.C. Anderlecht in 1975 and was a member of the club's greatest ever successful period, when they won two European Cup Winners' Cups in 1976 and 1978. Those two seasons, he won two more European Super Cups (the previous two were with Ajax). The club again reached the final of that Cup Winners' Cup in 1977 too, but they were beaten by Hamburger SV. Also with Anderlecht he won the Belgian Cup in 1975–76 and the Belgian Championship in 1980–81.

After winning the championship with Anderlecht, he played for Standard Liège for two seasons, when the club won two championships. also the Belgian Supercup in 1981. In 1982, the club achieved its greatest success, when they reached their first (and to date the only) Cup Winners' Cup final, when they were beaten at Camp Nou by FC Barcelona. That year they also won the only double in their history. Returning to his country in 1983, he played one season for PSV. Haan finished his career for Hong Kong champions Seiko SA.

He has 35 matches with his national team, scoring 6 goals. His most famous was a 40-yard strike in the Netherlands' match against Italy in the second group stage of the 1978 FIFA World Cup against goalkeeper Dino Zoff. His goal in the 2–2 game against West Germany, also a strike from far out in the field, helped the Netherlands national team reach the final, where they were beaten by Argentina 3–1 in extra time. He also participated in the 1974 FIFA World Cup when the Netherlands were beaten in the final by West Germany 2–1.

== Style of play ==
A tall and strong player known for his stamina, versatility and tenacity, Haan was capable of playing in various positions, such as central midfielder, defensive midfielder, center-back, full-back and even as a sweeper. At Ajax, Haan, partnered alongside Johan Neeskens and Gerrie Muhren, excelled in a holding role, breaking down plays from opponents and covering for his teammates. He would later be partnered with Ludo Coeck at Anderlecht, playing in a more advanced role. With Barry Hulshoff absent from injury and Rinus Israel not fully fit, Haan was chosen by Dutch coach Rinus Michels to play alongside Wim Rijsbergen in the defence, and as a sweeper. Haan was also equally at home in offensive work, and was known for his powerful long-range shots, famously scoring two in the 1978 FIFA World Cup against Sepp Maier and Dino Zoff, both considered to be two of the best goalkeepers in the world. Because of his powerful shots, Haan was nicknamed "Arie Bombarie".

== Managerial career ==
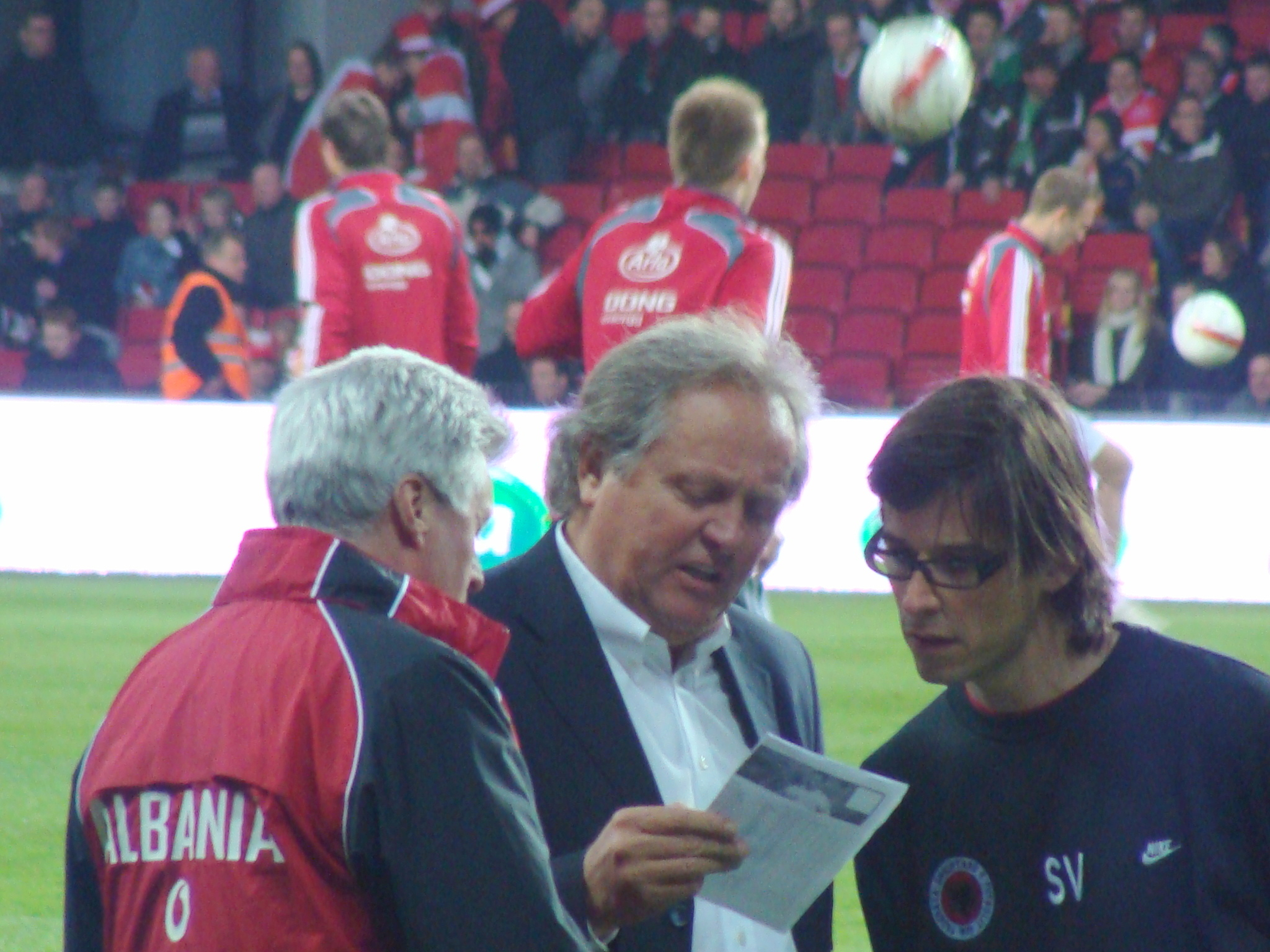
Haan before the World Cup qualifier against Denmark in 2009

Two months after retiring as a player, he became trainer of Antwerp. However, in the middle of the 1985–86 season he became coach of Anderlecht Brussels, replacing Paul Van Himst who was fired from the club. Franky Vercauteren and Morten Olsen featured in his team alongside players like goalkeeper Jacky Munaron, Luka Peruzović, Erwin Vandenbergh, Alex Czerniatynski, Enzo Scifo and Georges Grün. In 1986, Anderlecht won the championship, after a two-legged play-off against Club Brugge. Club Brugge forced a 1–1 draw away to Anderlecht, and led 2–0 at home after thirty minutes, but Anderlecht managed to equalise. The same season, the club reached the semi-finals of the European Champions' Cup, by eliminating Bayern Munich. The following season, his team retained the Belgian Championship.

After Belgium he became trainer of VfB Stuttgart in Germany on 1 July 1987. Stuttgart reached their first European cup final in 1989, the UEFA Cup, but failed to win the trophy against SSC Napoli (1–2, 3–3), a team that Diego Maradona was playing for at the time. He remained in Stuttgart until 26 March 1990. In July 1990 he became manager of 1. FC Nürnberg where he remained for a single season.

Returning to Belgium in 1991, he coached Standard Liège until the middle of the season 1993–94 and won the Belgian Cup in 1993. In the 1994–95 season he was appointed coach of PAOK FC and he remained there until October 1995, after which he returned to the Netherlands and managed Feyenoord for two seasons. In his first full season in charge, Feyenoord finished second in the Eredivisie.

After ten years, in December 1997, Haan enjoyed a further stint at Anderlecht, spending nine months at the club before returning to PAOK, where he remained as coach until December 1999. He went to Cyprus, to become AC Omonia manager in November 2000 but he coached the team only for two matches since he had a great offer from Austria Vienna to become the team's manager. He asked from his club to release his contract and that was accepted. He left from Austria in August 2001.

He coached the China national team for two years since December 2002. In 2004, China hosted the Asia Cup and reached the final where his team was beaten by Japan. However, his team did not qualify for the 2006 FIFA World Cup after their elimination from the First round of qualifications, where China lost the first position the group to Kuwait. He remained as coach of China until November 2004.

Moving to Persepolis F.C. in February 2006, he helped his team reach the Hazfi Cup final. He was fired by the club just before the 2006–07 season began as he had problems with club management. Recently, he became trainer of Cameroon national team, however he resigned less than six months into a two-year contract citing interference from the president of Cameroon Football Federation Mohammed Iya as the reason.

In December 2007, Albanian Football Association president Armand Duka announced Haan would replace Croatia's Otto Baric as Albania head coach. He signed a two-year contract on 4 January 2008 and cancelled his contract on 15 April 2009. On 29 May 2009 it was confirmed that Haan would succeed Wei Xin as the new manager of struggling Chinese Super League side Chongqing Lifan and took over in June that year. In August 2009, Haan was suspended for three Super League matches after waving money at a referee. Chongqing Lifan were relegated at the end of the 2009 league season and Haan left for fellow Chinese Super League team Tianjin Teda F.C. He brought the team to the second place in 2010 season, the club's highest rank ever achieved in the China Super League, which earned the team a place in the AFC Champions League in 2011. In the 2011 season of CSL, though the team only ranked 10th. at last, Haan led the team won the championship of China's FA Cup, with the score of 2–1 against Shandong Luneng Taishan F.C. This championship is the first title Tianjin Teda achieved since its establishment in 1998.

Haan decided to retire as manager in April 2016, citing lack of motivation and health issues.

== Career statistics ==
=== International ===
Appearances and goals by national team and year
National team	Year	Apps	Goals
Netherlands	1972	1	0
Netherlands	1973	7	1
Netherlands	1974	13	2
Netherlands	1975	0	0
Netherlands	1976	2	0
Netherlands	1977	0	0
Netherlands	1978	9	3
Netherlands	1979	0	0
Netherlands	1980	3	0
Total		35	6

Scores and results list the Netherlands' goal tally first, score column indicates score after each Haan goal.

List of international goals scored by Arie Haan
No.	Date	Venue	Opponent	Score	Result	Competition
1	22 August 1973	De Meer, Amsterdam, Netherlands	Iceland	3–0	5–0	1974 FIFA World Cup qualification
2	26 May 1974	Olympisch Stadion, Amsterdam, Netherlands	Argentina	4–1	4–1	Friendly
3	4 September 1974	Råsunda Stadium, Solna, Sweden	Sweden	2–0	5–1	Friendly
4	20 May 1978	Prater Stadium, Vienna, Austria	Austria	1–0	1–0	Friendly
5	18 June 1978	Estadio Córdoba, Córdoba, Argentina	West Germany	1–1	2–2	1978 FIFA World Cup
6	21 June 1978	Estadio Monumental, Buenos Aires, Argentina	Italy	2–1	2–1	1978 FIFA World Cup

== Managerial statistics ==
=== Statistics with the Albania team ===
As of 8 September 2014.

Team	From	To	Record				
Team	From	To	G	W	D	L	Win %
Albania	27 May 2008	1 April 2009	10	2	4	4	20.00

== Honours ==
=== Player ===
Ajax

- Eredivisie: 1969–70, 1971–72, 1972–73
- KNVB Cup: 1969–70, 1970–71, 1971–72
- European Cup: 1970–71, 1971–72, 1972–73
- Intercontinental Cup: 1972
- European Super Cup: 1972, 1973

Anderlecht

- Belgian First Division: 1980–81
- Belgian Cup: 1975–76
- European Cup Winners' Cup: 1975–76, 1977–78; runner-up 1976–77
- European Super Cup: 1976, 1978
- Amsterdam Tournament: 1976
- Tournoi de Paris: 1977
- Jules Pappaert Cup: 1977
- Belgian Sports Merit Award: 1978

Standard Liège

- Belgian First Division: 1981–82, 1982–83
- European Cup Winners' Cup: runner-up 1981–82

PSV

- Eredivisie: runner-up 1983–84

Seiko

- Hong Kong First Division League: 1984–85
- Hong Kong Viceroy Cup: 1984–85

Netherlands

- FIFA World Cup: runner-up 1974, 1978
- Tournoi de Paris: 1978

Individual

- Onze Mondial: 1978, 1979

=== Manager ===
Anderlecht

- Belgian First Division: 1985–86

VfB Stuttgart

- UEFA Cup: runner-up 1988–89

Standard Liège

- Belgian Cup: 1992–93

Feyenoord

- Eredivisie: runner-up 1996–97

Tianjin Teda

- Chinese FA Cup: 2011
