= Rüdiger Abramczik =

German footballer and coach (born 1956)

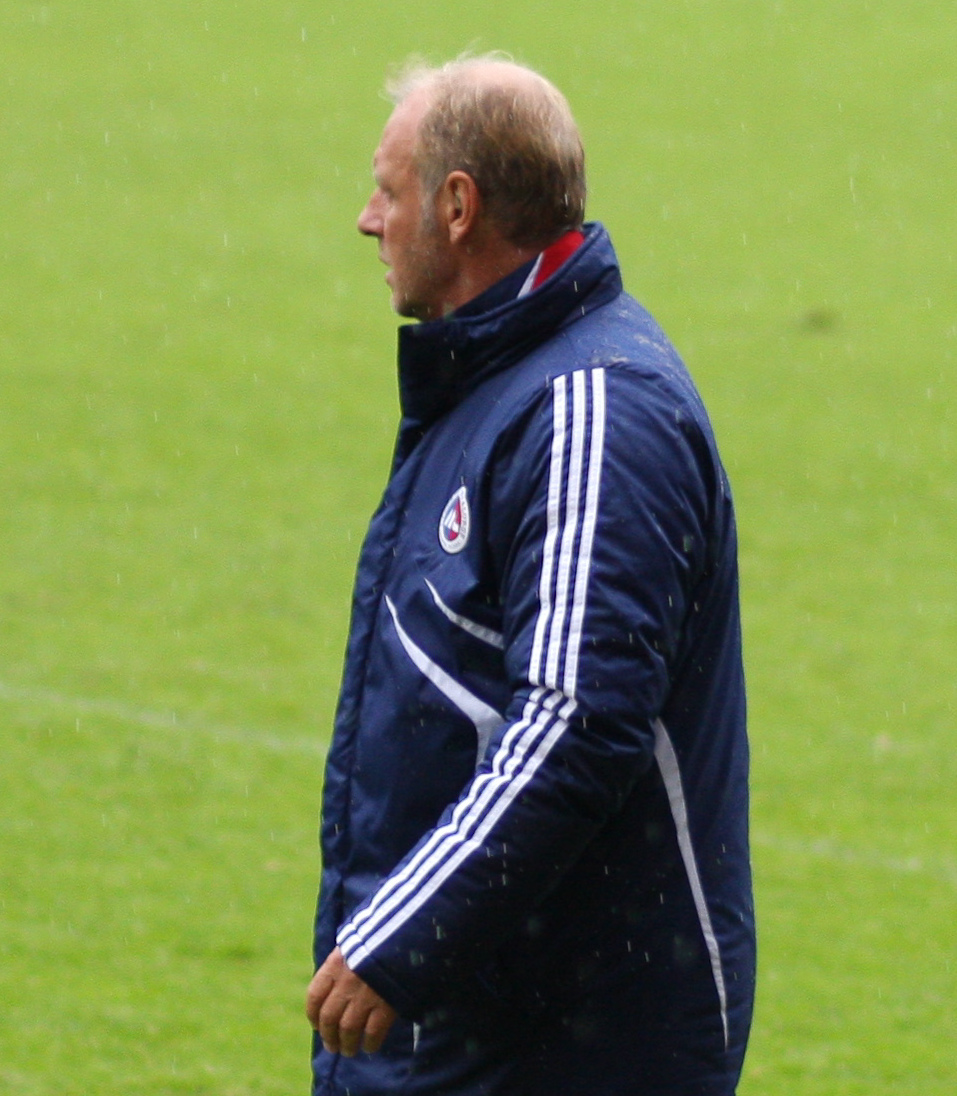
- Abramczik in 2009

Personal information
- Date of birth: 18 February 1956 (age 70)
- Place of birth: Gelsenkirchen, West Germany
- Height: 1.82 m (6 ft 0 in)
- Position: Striker

Youth career
- 1964–1966: SV Erle 08
- 1966–1973: Schalke 04

Senior career*
Years	Team	Apps	(Gls)
1973–1980	Schalke 04	198	(44)
1980–1983	Borussia Dortmund	90	(30)
1983–1984	1. FC Nürnberg	24	(3)
1984–1985	Galatasaray S.K.	30	(9)
1985–1987	Rot-Weiß Oberhausen	47	(9)
1987–1988	Schalke 04	4	(0)
1988–1989	Wormatia Worms	9	(5)
1989–1991	FC Gütersloh		

International career
1976–1981	West Germany B	3	(0)
1977–1979	West Germany	19	(2)

Managerial career
- 1992–1993: 1. FC Saarbrücken
- 1999–2000: Antalyaspor
- 2001: Levski Sofia
- 2002–2003: FC Kärnten
- 2004–2005: FC Karpa
- 2005–2006: HSG Mülheim-Kärlich
- 2008–2010: FK Liepājas Metalurgs
- * Club domestic league appearances and goals

Rüdiger Abramczik (born 18 February 1956) is a former German football player and coach, best known for his ability to cross the ball ("Flankengott").

== Club career ==
Abramczik was born in Gelsenkirchen-Erle. He, whose younger brother Volker later became also a professional footballer for FC Schalke 04, joined the ranks of the city's biggest club, Schalke 04, from native SV Erle 08 at the age of ten after former German international Bernhard Klodt spotted him. Schalke's former Bundesliga player Friedel Rausch was partly coaching him in the youth of Schalke then, getting impressed by his unique mobility and pace. It was Rausch who warmly recommended young Abi to Schalke's manager Ivica Horvat, feeling the schoolboy international (23 caps) could already do a job on the highest level.

For the kick-off of the 1973–74 Bundesliga season, FC Schalke 04 travelled to VfB Stuttgart to see Horvath handing him a starting role. Schalke lost, with Stuttgart's Hermann Ohlicher's hat-trick the only goals in the game, but Abramczik's appearance on that 11 August made him the youngest ever player used on Bundesliga level at that time. Making fourteen appearances in his Bundesliga debut season, he went on to become a key player for his club in less than three years, netting ten goals for Schalke in 1976–77, when they finished runner-up behind Borussia Mönchengladbach. The yield of ten goals scored by the then 20-year-old Abramczik remained the best effort of a young Bundesliga player until Lukas Podolski hit ten for 1. FC Köln as an eighteen-year-old in 2003–04.

Joining FC Schalke 04's bitter arch-rival Borussia Dortmund at the end of the 1979–80 season, Abramczik's days in Dortmund lasted until he joined 1. FC Nürnberg in 1983. That worked out to be a disastrous career move for the Gelsenkirchen-born, his new club was relegated from Bundesliga with him getting suspended by the club for committing misconduct. He then showed up for Galatasaray Istanbul under Jupp Derwall and had a spell with Rot-Weiß Oberhausen in the 2. Bundesliga before heading back to hometown club FC Schalke 04 in October 1987. Coming to action in four further Bundesliga matches in the space of five weeks for them, a campaign in which Schalke was chanceless to avoid the drop to 2. Bundesliga, Abramczik decided to retire from the professional game to go on playing on amateur level for Wormatia Worms and FC Gütersloh.

== International career ==
Köln's Müngersdorfer Stadion witnessed Rüdiger Abramczik's Germany debut when the side of Helmut Schön beat Northern Ireland (5–0) on 27 April 1977. Abramczik, who was forming a formidable striker duo with Klaus Fischer for Schalke at that time, was called up further by Schön and with the 1978 FIFA World Cup at stage, Abramczik enjoyed his taking part in it for the defending champion. Tipped to be a delight for Germany, failing to produce greater consistency in his game appeared to be the bar to his further proceedings in Die Nationalmannschaft. His life as a German international lasted for only nineteen caps in between 1977 and 1979, with a 3–1 win against Malta at Gżira his last international cap, an abrupt end furthered by a voiced conflict with then DFB president Hermann Neuberger.

== Coaching career ==
Abramczik's career in coaching was caused by his decision to work as assistant-manager of Peter Neururer at 1. FC Saarbrücken when he run a dyeworks shop in Gelsenkirchen. A year later, Saarbrücken appointed him Neururer's successor in 1992. He managed Antalyaspor from 1999 to 2000.

== Career statistics ==
Scores and results list West Germany's goal tally first, score column indicates score after each Abramczik goal.

List of international goals scored by Rüdiger Abramczik
No.	Date	Venue	Opponent	Score	Result	Competition
1	18 June 1978	Estadio Chateau Carreras, Córdoba, Argentina	Netherlands	1–0	2–2	1978 FIFA World Cup
2	11 October 1978	Letná Stadion, Prague, Czechoslovakia	Czechoslovakia	1–0	4–3	Friendly
