= 1974 FIFA World Cup squads =

Below are the squads for the 1974 FIFA World Cup final tournament in West Germany. For the first time, a majority of countries (9 of 16) had players representing foreign clubs.

== Group 1 ==
=== West Germany ===
Head coach: Helmut Schön

| No. | Pos. | Player | Date of birth (age) | Caps | Club |
|---|---|---|---|---|---|
| 1 | GK | Sepp Maier | 28 February 1944 (aged 30) | 50 | (West Germany) Bayern Munich |
| 2 | DF | Berti Vogts | 30 December 1946 (aged 27) | 51 | (West Germany) Borussia Mönchengladbach |
| 3 | DF | Paul Breitner | 5 September 1951 (aged 22) | 19 | (West Germany) Bayern Munich |
| 4 | DF | Hans-Georg Schwarzenbeck | 3 April 1948 (aged 26) | 23 | (West Germany) Bayern Munich |
| 5 | DF | Franz Beckenbauer (captain) | 11 September 1945 (aged 28) | 78 | (West Germany) Bayern Munich |
| 6 | DF | Horst-Dieter Höttges | 10 September 1943 (aged 30) | 65 | (West Germany) Werder Bremen |
| 7 | MF | Herbert Wimmer | 9 November 1944 (aged 29) | 23 | (West Germany) Borussia Mönchengladbach |
| 8 | MF | Bernhard Cullmann | 1 November 1949 (aged 24) | 12 | (West Germany) 1. FC Köln |
| 9 | FW | Jürgen Grabowski | 7 July 1944 (aged 29) | 38 | (West Germany) Eintracht Frankfurt |
| 10 | MF | Günter Netzer | 14 September 1944 (aged 29) | 34 | (Spain) Real Madrid |
| 11 | FW | Jupp Heynckes | 9 May 1945 (aged 29) | 28 | (West Germany) Borussia Mönchengladbach |
| 12 | MF | Wolfgang Overath | 29 September 1943 (aged 30) | 74 | (West Germany) 1. FC Köln |
| 13 | FW | Gerd Müller | 3 November 1945 (aged 28) | 55 | (West Germany) Bayern Munich |
| 14 | FW | Uli Hoeneß | 5 January 1952 (aged 22) | 20 | (West Germany) Bayern Munich |
| 15 | MF | Heinz Flohe | 28 January 1948 (aged 26) | 14 | (West Germany) 1. FC Köln |
| 16 | MF | Rainer Bonhof | 29 March 1952 (aged 22) | 4 | (West Germany) Borussia Mönchengladbach |
| 17 | FW | Bernd Hölzenbein | 9 March 1946 (aged 28) | 4 | (West Germany) Eintracht Frankfurt |
| 18 | FW | Dieter Herzog | 15 July 1946 (aged 27) | 2 | (West Germany) Fortuna Düsseldorf |
| 19 | DF | Jupp Kapellmann | 19 December 1949 (aged 24) | 3 | (West Germany) Bayern Munich |
| 20 | DF | Helmut Kremers | 24 March 1949 (aged 25) | 5 | (West Germany) Schalke 04 |
| 21 | GK | Norbert Nigbur | 8 May 1948 (aged 26) | 2 | (West Germany) Schalke 04 |
| 22 | GK | Wolfgang Kleff | 16 November 1946 (aged 27) | 6 | (West Germany) Borussia Mönchengladbach |

=== East Germany ===
Head coach: Georg Buschner

| No. | Pos. | Player | Date of birth (age) | Caps | Club |
|---|---|---|---|---|---|
| 1 | GK | Jürgen Croy | 19 October 1946 (aged 27) | 43 | (East Germany) BSG Sachsenring Zwickau |
| 2 | DF | Lothar Kurbjuweit | 6 November 1950 (aged 23) | 30 | (East Germany) FC Carl Zeiss Jena |
| 3 | DF | Bernd Bransch (captain) | 24 September 1944 (aged 29) | 49 | (East Germany) FC Carl Zeiss Jena |
| 4 | DF | Konrad Weise | 17 August 1951 (aged 22) | 23 | (East Germany) FC Carl Zeiss Jena |
| 5 | DF | Joachim Fritsche | 28 October 1951 (aged 22) | 7 | (East Germany) 1. FC Lokomotive Leipzig |
| 6 | MF | Rüdiger Schnuphase | 23 January 1954 (aged 20) | 4 | (East Germany) FC Rot-Weiss Erfurt |
| 7 | MF | Jürgen Pommerenke | 22 January 1953 (aged 21) | 10 | (East Germany) 1. FC Magdeburg |
| 8 | FW | Wolfram Löwe | 14 May 1945 (aged 29) | 33 | (East Germany) 1. FC Lokomotive Leipzig |
| 9 | FW | Peter Ducke | 14 October 1941 (aged 32) | 57 | (East Germany) FC Carl Zeiss Jena |
| 10 | MF | Hans-Jürgen Kreische | 19 July 1947 (aged 26) | 38 | (East Germany) SG Dynamo Dresden |
| 11 | FW | Joachim Streich | 13 April 1951 (aged 23) | 30 | (East Germany) FC Hansa Rostock |
| 12 | DF | Siegmar Wätzlich | 16 November 1947 (aged 26) | 9 | (East Germany) SG Dynamo Dresden |
| 13 | MF | Reinhard Lauck | 16 September 1946 (aged 27) | 14 | (East Germany) BFC Dynamo |
| 14 | MF | Jürgen Sparwasser | 4 June 1948 (aged 26) | 29 | (East Germany) 1. FC Magdeburg |
| 15 | FW | Eberhard Vogel | 8 April 1943 (aged 31) | 53 | (East Germany) FC Carl Zeiss Jena |
| 16 | MF | Harald Irmscher | 12 February 1946 (aged 28) | 30 | (East Germany) FC Carl Zeiss Jena |
| 17 | MF | Erich Hamann | 27 November 1944 (aged 29) | 1 | (East Germany) FC Vorwärts Frankfurt (Oder) |
| 18 | DF | Gerd Kische | 23 October 1951 (aged 22) | 13 | (East Germany) FC Hansa Rostock |
| 19 | MF | Wolfgang Seguin | 14 September 1945 (aged 28) | 13 | (East Germany) 1. FC Magdeburg |
| 20 | FW | Martin Hoffmann | 22 March 1955 (aged 19) | 3 | (East Germany) 1. FC Magdeburg |
| 21 | GK | Wolfgang Blochwitz | 8 February 1941 (aged 33) | 17 | (East Germany) FC Carl Zeiss Jena |
| 22 | GK | Werner Friese | 30 March 1946 (aged 28) | 0 | (East Germany) 1. FC Lokomotive Leipzig |

=== Australia ===
Head coach: (Socialist Federal Republic of Yugoslavia) Rale Rasic

| No. | Pos. | Player | Date of birth (age) | Caps | Club |
|---|---|---|---|---|---|
| 1 | GK | Jack Reilly | 27 August 1945 (aged 28) | 12 | (Australia) Melbourne Hakoah |
| 2 | DF | Doug Utjesenovic | 8 October 1946 (aged 27) | 20 | (Australia) St George-Budapest |
| 3 | DF | Peter Wilson (captain) | 15 September 1947 (aged 26) | 31 | (Australia) Safeway United |
| 4 | DF | Manfred Schaefer | 12 February 1943 (aged 31) | 46 | (Australia) St George-Budapest |
| 5 | DF | Colin Curran | 21 August 1947 (aged 26) | 12 | (Australia) Western Suburbs |
| 6 | MF | Ray Richards | 18 May 1946 (aged 28) | 28 | (Australia) Marconi Fairfield |
| 7 | MF | Jimmy Rooney | 10 December 1945 (aged 28) | 20 | (Australia) APIA Leichhardt |
| 8 | MF | Jimmy Mackay | 19 December 1943 (aged 30) | 28 | (Australia) Sydney Hakoah |
| 9 | MF | Johnny Warren | 17 May 1943 (aged 31) | 41 | (Australia) St George-Budapest |
| 10 | FW | Garry Manuel | 20 February 1950 (aged 24) | 4 | (Australia) Pan-Hellenic |
| 11 | FW | Attila Abonyi | 16 August 1946 (aged 27) | 39 | (Australia) St George-Budapest |
| 12 | FW | Adrian Alston | 6 February 1949 (aged 25) | 33 | (Australia) Safeway United |
| 13 | MF | Peter Ollerton | 20 May 1951 (aged 23) | 4 | (Australia) APIA Leichhardt |
| 14 | MF | Max Tolson | 18 July 1945 (aged 28) | 16 | (Australia) Safeway United |
| 15 | DF | Harry Williams | 7 May 1951 (aged 23) | 2 | (Australia) St George-Budapest |
| 16 | DF | Ivo Rudic | 24 January 1942 (aged 32) | 0 | (Australia) Pan-Hellenic |
| 17 | DF | Dave Harding | 14 August 1946 (aged 27) | 1 | (Australia) Pan-Hellenic |
| 18 | MF | Johnny Watkiss | 28 March 1941 (aged 33) | 23 | (Australia) Sydney Hakoah |
| 19 | MF | Ernie Campbell | 20 October 1949 (aged 24) | 8 | (Australia) Marconi Fairfield |
| 20 | FW | Branko Buljevic | 6 September 1947 (aged 26) | 19 | (Australia) Footscray JUST |
| 21 | GK | Jim Milisavljevic | 15 April 1951 (aged 23) | 0 | (Australia) Footscray JUST |
| 22 | GK | Allan Maher | 21 July 1950 (aged 23) | 0 | (Australia) Sutherland Shire |

=== Chile ===
Head coach: Luis Alamos

| No. | Pos. | Player | Date of birth (age) | Caps | Club |
|---|---|---|---|---|---|
| 1 | GK | Leopoldo Vallejos | 16 July 1944 (aged 29) | 13 | (Chile) Unión Española |
| 2 | DF | Rolando García | 15 December 1942 (aged 31) | 14 | (Chile) Colo-Colo |
| 3 | DF | Alberto Quintano | 26 April 1946 (aged 28) | 33 | (Mexico) Cruz Azul |
| 4 | DF | Antonio Arias | 9 October 1944 (aged 29) | 25 | (Chile) Unión Española |
| 5 | DF | Elías Figueroa | 25 October 1946 (aged 27) | 19 | (Brazil) Internacional |
| 6 | DF | Juan Rodríguez | 16 January 1944 (aged 30) | 24 | (Mexico) Atlético Español |
| 7 | FW | Carlos Caszely | 5 July 1950 (aged 23) | 20 | (Spain) Levante |
| 8 | MF | Francisco Valdés (captain) | 19 March 1943 (aged 31) | 44 | (Chile) Colo-Colo |
| 9 | FW | Sergio Ahumada | 2 October 1948 (aged 25) | 12 | (Chile) Colo-Colo |
| 10 | MF | Carlos Reinoso | 7 March 1945 (aged 29) | 25 | (Mexico) América |
| 11 | FW | Leonardo Véliz | 3 September 1945 (aged 28) | 18 | (Chile) Colo-Colo |
| 12 | DF | Juan Machuca | 7 March 1951 (aged 23) | 18 | (Chile) Unión Española |
| 13 | DF | Rafael González | 24 April 1950 (aged 24) | 10 | (Chile) Colo-Colo |
| 14 | MF | Alfonso Lara | 27 April 1946 (aged 28) | 27 | (Chile) Colo-Colo |
| 15 | DF | Mario Galindo | 10 August 1951 (aged 22) | 6 | (Chile) Colo-Colo |
| 16 | MF | Guillermo Páez | 18 April 1945 (aged 29) | 11 | (Chile) Colo-Colo |
| 17 | FW | Guillermo Yávar | 26 March 1943 (aged 31) | 24 | Universidad de Chile |
| 18 | MF | Jorge Socías | 6 October 1951 (aged 22) | 2 | Universidad de Chile |
| 19 | MF | Rogelio Farías | 13 August 1949 (aged 24) | 10 | (Chile) Unión Española |
| 20 | FW | Osvaldo Castro | 14 April 1947 (aged 27) | 24 | (Mexico) América |
| 21 | GK | Juan Olivares | 20 February 1941 (aged 33) | 32 | (Chile) Unión Española |
| 22 | GK | Adolfo Nef | 18 January 1946 (aged 28) | 26 | (Chile) Colo-Colo |

== Group 2 ==
=== Brazil ===
Head coach: Mário Zagallo

| No. | Pos. | Player | Date of birth (age) | Caps | Club |
|---|---|---|---|---|---|
| 1 | GK | Leão | 11 July 1949 (aged 24) | 19 | (Brazil) Palmeiras |
| 2 | DF | Luís Pereira | 21 June 1949 (aged 24) | 15 | (Brazil) Palmeiras |
| 3 | DF | Marinho Peres | 19 March 1947 (aged 27) | 5 | (Brazil) Santos |
| 4 | DF | Zé Maria | 18 May 1949 (aged 25) | 28 | (Brazil) Corinthians |
| 5 | MF | Piazza (captain) | 25 February 1943 (aged 31) | 44 | (Brazil) Cruzeiro |
| 6 | DF | Marinho Chagas | 8 February 1952 (aged 22) | 9 | (Brazil) Botafogo |
| 7 | FW | Jairzinho | 25 December 1944 (aged 29) | 73 | (Brazil) Botafogo |
| 8 | MF | Leivinha | 11 September 1949 (aged 24) | 18 | (Brazil) Palmeiras |
| 9 | FW | César | 17 May 1945 (aged 29) | 8 | (Brazil) Palmeiras |
| 10 | MF | Rivellino | 1 January 1946 (aged 28) | 57 | (Brazil) Corinthians |
| 11 | MF | Paulo Cézar | 16 June 1949 (aged 24) | 43 | (Brazil) Flamengo |
| 12 | GK | Renato | 5 December 1944 (aged 29) | 2 | (Brazil) Flamengo |
| 13 | FW | Valdomiro | 17 February 1946 (aged 28) | 9 | (Brazil) Internacional |
| 14 | DF | Nelinho | 26 July 1950 (aged 23) | 2 | (Brazil) Cruzeiro |
| 15 | DF | Alfredo | 18 October 1946 (aged 27) | 1 | (Brazil) Palmeiras |
| 16 | DF | Marco Antônio | 6 February 1951 (aged 23) | 27 | (Brazil) Fluminense |
| 17 | MF | Carpegiani | 7 February 1949 (aged 25) | 5 | (Brazil) Internacional |
| 18 | MF | Ademir da Guia | 3 April 1942 (aged 32) | 8 | (Brazil) Palmeiras |
| 19 | FW | Mirandinha | 26 February 1952 (aged 22) | 3 | (Brazil) São Paulo |
| 20 | FW | Edu | 6 August 1949 (aged 24) | 41 | (Brazil) Santos |
| 21 | FW | Dirceu | 15 June 1952 (aged 21) | 4 | (Brazil) Botafogo |
| 22 | GK | Waldir Peres | 2 February 1951 (aged 23) | 0 | (Brazil) São Paulo |

=== Scotland ===
Head coach: Willie Ormond

| No. | Pos. | Player | Date of birth (age) | Caps | Club |
|---|---|---|---|---|---|
| 1 | GK | David Harvey | 7 February 1948 (aged 26) | 7 | (England) Leeds United |
| 2 | DF | Sandy Jardine | 31 December 1948 (aged 25) | 16 | (Scotland) Rangers |
| 3 | DF | Danny McGrain | 1 May 1950 (aged 24) | 12 | (Scotland) Celtic |
| 4 | MF | Billy Bremner (captain) | 9 December 1942 (aged 31) | 48 | (England) Leeds United |
| 5 | DF | Jim Holton | 11 April 1951 (aged 23) | 11 | (England) Manchester United |
| 6 | DF | John Blackley | 12 May 1948 (aged 26) | 3 | (Scotland) Hibernian |
| 7 | FW | Jimmy Johnstone | 30 September 1944 (aged 29) | 21 | (Scotland) Celtic |
| 8 | MF | Kenny Dalglish | 4 March 1951 (aged 23) | 19 | (Scotland) Celtic |
| 9 | FW | Joe Jordan | 15 December 1951 (aged 22) | 11 | (England) Leeds United |
| 10 | MF | David Hay | 29 January 1948 (aged 26) | 24 | (Scotland) Celtic |
| 11 | FW | Peter Lorimer | 14 December 1946 (aged 27) | 14 | (England) Leeds United |
| 12 | GK | Thomson Allan | 5 October 1946 (aged 27) | 2 | (Scotland) Dundee |
| 13 | GK | Jim Stewart | 9 March 1954 (aged 20) | 0 | (Scotland) Kilmarnock |
| 14 | DF | Martin Buchan | 6 March 1949 (aged 25) | 13 | (England) Manchester United |
| 15 | MF | Peter Cormack | 17 July 1946 (aged 27) | 9 | (England) Liverpool |
| 16 | DF | Willie Donachie | 5 October 1951 (aged 22) | 11 | (England) Manchester City |
| 17 | FW | Donald Ford | 25 October 1944 (aged 29) | 3 | (Scotland) Heart of Midlothian |
| 18 | MF | Tommy Hutchison | 22 September 1947 (aged 26) | 8 | (England) Coventry City |
| 19 | FW | Denis Law | 24 February 1940 (aged 34) | 54 | (England) Manchester City |
| 20 | FW | Willie Morgan | 2 October 1944 (aged 29) | 19 | (England) Manchester United |
| 21 | DF | Gordon McQueen | 26 June 1952 (aged 21) | 1 | (England) Leeds United |
| 22 | DF | Erich Schaedler | 6 August 1949 (aged 24) | 1 | (Scotland) Hibernian |

=== Yugoslavia ===
Head coach: Miljan Miljanić

| No. | Pos. | Player | Date of birth (age) | Caps | Club |
|---|---|---|---|---|---|
| 1 | GK | Enver Marić | 23 April 1948 (aged 26) | 23 | (Socialist Federal Republic of Yugoslavia) Velež Mostar |
| 2 | DF | Ivan Buljan | 11 December 1949 (aged 24) | 7 | (Socialist Federal Republic of Yugoslavia) Hajduk Split |
| 3 | DF | Enver Hadžiabdić | 6 November 1945 (aged 28) | 5 | (Socialist Federal Republic of Yugoslavia) Željezničar |
| 4 | MF | Dražen Mužinić | 25 January 1953 (aged 21) | 3 | (Socialist Federal Republic of Yugoslavia) Hajduk Split |
| 5 | DF | Josip Katalinski | 12 May 1948 (aged 26) | 21 | (Socialist Federal Republic of Yugoslavia) Željezničar |
| 6 | MF | Vladislav Bogićević | 7 November 1950 (aged 23) | 9 | (Socialist Federal Republic of Yugoslavia) Red Star Belgrade |
| 7 | FW | Ilija Petković | 22 September 1945 (aged 28) | 38 | (France) Troyes AF |
| 8 | MF | Branko Oblak | 27 May 1947 (aged 27) | 29 | (Socialist Federal Republic of Yugoslavia) Hajduk Split |
| 9 | FW | Ivica Šurjak | 23 March 1953 (aged 21) | 7 | (Socialist Federal Republic of Yugoslavia) Hajduk Split |
| 10 | MF | Jovan Aćimović | 21 June 1948 (aged 25) | 43 | (Socialist Federal Republic of Yugoslavia) Red Star Belgrade |
| 11 | FW | Dragan Džajić (captain) | 30 May 1946 (aged 28) | 72 | (Socialist Federal Republic of Yugoslavia) Red Star Belgrade |
| 12 | MF | Jurica Jerković | 25 February 1950 (aged 24) | 25 | (Socialist Federal Republic of Yugoslavia) Hajduk Split |
| 13 | MF | Miroslav Pavlović | 23 October 1942 (aged 31) | 45 | (Socialist Federal Republic of Yugoslavia) Red Star Belgrade |
| 14 | DF | Luka Peruzović | 26 February 1952 (aged 22) | 0 | (Socialist Federal Republic of Yugoslavia) Hajduk Split |
| 15 | DF | Kiril Dojčinovski | 17 October 1943 (aged 30) | 6 | (Socialist Federal Republic of Yugoslavia) Red Star Belgrade |
| 16 | MF | Franjo Vladić | 19 October 1951 (aged 22) | 16 | (Socialist Federal Republic of Yugoslavia) Velež Mostar |
| 17 | FW | Danilo Popivoda | 1 May 1947 (aged 27) | 8 | (Socialist Federal Republic of Yugoslavia) Olimpija Ljubljana |
| 18 | FW | Stanislav Karasi | 8 November 1946 (aged 27) | 6 | (Socialist Federal Republic of Yugoslavia) Red Star Belgrade |
| 19 | FW | Dušan Bajević | 10 December 1948 (aged 25) | 28 | (Socialist Federal Republic of Yugoslavia) Velež Mostar |
| 20 | MF | Vladimir Petrović | 1 July 1955 (aged 18) | 5 | (Socialist Federal Republic of Yugoslavia) Red Star Belgrade |
| 21 | GK | Ognjen Petrović | 2 January 1948 (aged 26) | 2 | (Socialist Federal Republic of Yugoslavia) Red Star Belgrade |
| 22 | GK | Rizah Mešković | 10 August 1947 (aged 26) | 1 | (Socialist Federal Republic of Yugoslavia) Hajduk Split |

=== Zaire ===
Head coach: (Socialist Federal Republic of Yugoslavia) Blagoje Vidinić

| No. | Pos. | Player | Date of birth (age) | Caps | Club |
|---|---|---|---|---|---|
| 1 | GK | Kazadi Mwamba | 6 March 1947 (aged 27) | 0 | (Zaire) TP Mazembe |
| 2 | DF | Mwepu Ilunga | 22 August 1949 (aged 24) | 0 | (Zaire) TP Mazembe |
| 3 | DF | Mwanza Mukombo | 17 December 1945 (aged 28) | 0 | (Zaire) TP Mazembe |
| 4 | DF | Bwanga Tshimen | 4 January 1949 (aged 25) | 0 | (Zaire) TP Mazembe |
| 5 | DF | Lobilo Boba | 10 April 1950 (aged 24) | 0 | (Zaire) AS Vita Club |
| 6 | MF | Kilasu Massamba | 24 November 1948 (aged 25) | 0 | (Zaire) AS Bilima |
| 7 | MF | Tshinabu Wa Munda | 8 May 1946 (aged 28) | 0 | (Zaire) TP Mazembe |
| 8 | MF | Mana Mamuwene | 10 October 1947 (aged 26) | 0 | (Zaire) DCS Irboual |
| 9 | MF | Kembo Uba Kembo | 27 December 1947 (aged 27) | 0 | (Zaire) AS Vita Club |
| 10 | MF | Kidumu Mantantu (captain) | 17 November 1946 (aged 27) | 0 | (Zaire) CS Imana |
| 11 | DF | Kabasu Babo | 4 March 1950 (aged 24) | ? | (Zaire) AS Bilima |
| 12 | GK | Tubilandu Ndimbi | 15 March 1948 (aged 26) | 0 | (Zaire) AS Vita Club |
| 13 | MF | Ndaye Mulamba | 4 November 1948 (aged 25) | 0 | (Zaire) AS Vita Club |
| 14 | FW | Mayanga Maku | 31 October 1948 (aged 25) | 0 | (Zaire) AS Vita Club |
| 15 | MF | Kibonge Mafu | 12 February 1945 (aged 29) | 0 | (Zaire) AS Vita Club |
| 16 | DF | Mwape Mialo | 30 December 1951 (aged 22) | ? | (Zaire) FC Nyiki |
| 17 | MF | Kafula Ngoie | 11 November 1945 (aged 28) | ? | (Zaire) TP Mazembe |
| 18 | FW | Mavuba Mafuila | 15 December 1949 (aged 24) | ? | (Zaire) AS Vita Club |
| 19 | FW | Mbungu Ekofa | 24 November 1947 (aged 26) | ? | (Zaire) CS Imana |
| 20 | FW | Jean Kalala N'Tumba | 7 January 1949 (aged 25) | 0 | (Zaire) AS Vita Club |
| 21 | FW | Kakoko Etepe | 22 November 1950 (aged 23) | 0 | (Zaire) CS Imana |
| 22 | GK | Kalambay Otepa | 12 November 1948 (aged 25) | ? | (Zaire) TP Mazembe |

== Group 3 ==
=== Netherlands ===
Head coach: Rinus Michels

| No. | Pos. | Player | Date of birth (age) | Caps | Club |
|---|---|---|---|---|---|
| 1 | FW | Ruud Geels | 28 July 1948 (aged 25) | 3 | (Belgium) Club Brugge |
| 2 | DF | Arie Haan | 16 November 1948 (aged 25) | 10 | (Netherlands) Ajax |
| 3 | MF | Willem van Hanegem | 20 February 1944 (aged 30) | 29 | (Netherlands) Feyenoord |
| 4 | DF | Kees van Ierssel | 6 December 1945 (aged 28) | 4 | (Netherlands) Twente |
| 5 | DF | Rinus Israël | 19 March 1942 (aged 32) | 44 | (Netherlands) Feyenoord |
| 6 | MF | Wim Jansen | 28 October 1946 (aged 27) | 25 | (Netherlands) Feyenoord |
| 7 | MF | Theo de Jong | 11 August 1947 (aged 26) | 8 | (Netherlands) Feyenoord |
| 8 | GK | Jan Jongbloed | 25 November 1940 (aged 33) | 2 | (Netherlands) FC Amsterdam |
| 9 | FW | Piet Keizer | 14 June 1943 (aged 30) | 33 | (Netherlands) Ajax |
| 10 | FW | René van de Kerkhof | 16 September 1951 (aged 22) | 5 | (Netherlands) PSV Eindhoven |
| 11 | MF | Willy van de Kerkhof | 16 September 1951 (aged 22) | 1 | (Netherlands) PSV Eindhoven |
| 12 | DF | Ruud Krol | 24 March 1949 (aged 25) | 20 | (Netherlands) Ajax |
| 13 | MF | Johan Neeskens | 15 September 1951 (aged 22) | 17 | (Netherlands) Ajax |
| 14 | MF | Johan Cruyff (captain) | 25 April 1947 (aged 27) | 28 | (Spain) Barcelona |
| 15 | FW | Rob Rensenbrink | 3 July 1947 (aged 26) | 13 | (Belgium) Anderlecht |
| 16 | FW | Johnny Rep | 25 November 1951 (aged 22) | 5 | (Netherlands) Ajax |
| 17 | DF | Wim Rijsbergen | 18 January 1952 (aged 22) | 1 | (Netherlands) Feyenoord |
| 18 | GK | Piet Schrijvers | 15 December 1946 (aged 27) | 5 | (Netherlands) Twente |
| 19 | DF | Pleun Strik | 27 May 1944 (aged 30) | 8 | (Netherlands) PSV Eindhoven |
| 20 | DF | Wim Suurbier | 16 January 1945 (aged 29) | 27 | (Netherlands) Ajax |
| 21 | GK | Eddy Treijtel | 28 May 1946 (aged 28) | 4 | (Netherlands) Feyenoord |
| 22 | DF | Harry Vos | 4 September 1946 (aged 27) | 0 | (Netherlands) Feyenoord |

Note that this squad is numbered alphabetically by surname, unlike traditional numbering systems where the goalkeeper has shirt number 1 and so forth. The one exception was Johan Cruyff, who was given his favoured 14.

=== Sweden ===
Head coach: Georg Ericson

| No. | Pos. | Player | Date of birth (age) | Caps | Club |
|---|---|---|---|---|---|
| 1 | GK | Ronnie Hellström | 21 February 1949 (aged 25) | 38 | (Sweden) Hammarby IF |
| 2 | DF | Jan Olsson | 30 March 1942 (aged 32) | 11 | (Sweden) Åtvidabergs FF |
| 3 | DF | Kent Karlsson | 25 November 1945 (aged 28) | 10 | (Sweden) Åtvidabergs FF |
| 4 | DF | Björn Nordqvist | 6 October 1942 (aged 31) | 73 | (Netherlands) PSV |
| 5 | DF | Björn Andersson | 20 July 1951 (aged 22) | 10 | (Sweden) Östers IF |
| 6 | MF | Ove Grahn | 9 May 1943 (aged 31) | 31 | (Switzerland) Grasshopper |
| 7 | MF | Bo Larsson (captain) | 5 May 1944 (aged 30) | 59 | (Sweden) Malmö FF |
| 8 | FW | Conny Torstensson | 28 August 1949 (aged 24) | 14 | (West Germany) Bayern Munich |
| 9 | MF | Ove Kindvall | 16 May 1943 (aged 31) | 39 | (Sweden) IFK Norrköping |
| 10 | FW | Ralf Edström | 7 October 1952 (aged 21) | 15 | (Netherlands) PSV |
| 11 | FW | Roland Sandberg | 16 December 1946 (aged 27) | 20 | (West Germany) 1. FC Kaiserslautern |
| 12 | GK | Sven-Gunnar Larsson | 10 May 1940 (aged 34) | 27 | (Sweden) Örebro SK |
| 13 | DF | Roland Grip | 1 January 1941 (aged 33) | 52 | (Sweden) IK Sirius |
| 14 | MF | Staffan Tapper | 10 July 1948 (aged 25) | 15 | (Sweden) Malmö FF |
| 15 | FW | Benno Magnusson | 4 February 1953 (aged 21) | 5 | (West Germany) 1. FC Kaiserslautern |
| 16 | FW | Inge Ejderstedt | 24 December 1946 (aged 27) | 20 | (Sweden) Östers IF |
| 17 | GK | Göran Hagberg | 8 November 1947 (aged 26) | 1 | (Sweden) Östers IF |
| 18 | DF | Jörgen Augustsson | 28 October 1952 (aged 21) | 0 | (Sweden) Åtvidabergs FF |
| 19 | DF | Claes Cronqvist | 15 October 1944 (aged 29) | 14 | (Sweden) Landskrona BoIS |
| 20 | MF | Sven Lindman | 19 April 1942 (aged 32) | 19 | (Sweden) Djurgårdens IF |
| 21 | MF | Örjan Persson | 27 August 1942 (aged 31) | 46 | (Sweden) Örgryte IS |
| 22 | MF | Thomas Ahlström | 17 July 1952 (aged 21) | 2 | (Sweden) IF Elfsborg |

=== Uruguay ===
Head coach: Roberto Porta

| No. | Pos. | Player | Date of birth (age) | Caps | Club |
|---|---|---|---|---|---|
| 1 | GK | Ladislao Mazurkiewicz | 14 February 1945 (aged 29) | 34 | (Brazil) Atlético Mineiro |
| 2 | DF | Baudilio Jáuregui | 9 July 1945 (aged 28) | 6 | (Uruguay) River Plate |
| 3 | DF | Juan Masnik (captain) | 2 March 1943 (aged 31) | 23 | (Uruguay) Nacional |
| 4 | DF | Pablo Forlán | 14 July 1945 (aged 28) | 12 | (Brazil) São Paulo |
| 5 | MF | Julio Montero Castillo | 25 April 1944 (aged 30) | 40 | (Uruguay) Nacional |
| 6 | DF | Ricardo Pavoni | 8 July 1943 (aged 30) | 10 | (Argentina) Independiente |
| 7 | FW | Luis Cubilla | 28 March 1940 (aged 34) | 36 | (Uruguay) Nacional |
| 8 | MF | Víctor Espárrago | 6 October 1944 (aged 29) | 38 | (Spain) Sevilla |
| 9 | FW | Fernando Morena | 2 February 1952 (aged 22) | 21 | (Uruguay) Peñarol |
| 10 | MF | Pedro Rocha | 3 December 1942 (aged 31) | 49 | (Brazil) São Paulo |
| 11 | FW | Rubén Corbo | 20 January 1952 (aged 22) | 21 | (Uruguay) Peñarol |
| 12 | GK | Héctor Santos | 29 October 1944 (aged 29) | 10 | (Peru) Alianza Lima |
| 13 | DF | Gustavo de Simone | 23 April 1948 (aged 26) | 8 | (Uruguay) Defensor Sporting |
| 14 | DF | Luis Garisto | 3 December 1945 (aged 28) | 3 | (Uruguay) Peñarol |
| 15 | DF | Mario González | 27 May 1950 (aged 24) | 13 | (Uruguay) Peñarol |
| 16 | MF | Alberto Cardaccio | 26 August 1949 (aged 24) | 18 | (Uruguay) Danubio |
| 17 | MF | Julio César Jiménez | 27 August 1954 (aged 19) | 11 | (Uruguay) Peñarol |
| 18 | MF | Walter Mantegazza | 17 June 1952 (aged 21) | 8 | (Uruguay) Nacional |
| 19 | FW | Denis Milar | 20 June 1952 (aged 21) | 12 | (Uruguay) Liverpool |
| 20 | FW | Juan Silva | 5 August 1948 (aged 25) | 6 | (Uruguay) Peñarol |
| 21 | FW | José Gómez | 23 October 1949 (aged 24) | 5 | (Uruguay) Cerro |
| 22 | GK | Gustavo Fernández | 16 February 1952 (aged 22) | 6 | (Uruguay) Rentistas |

=== Bulgaria ===
Head coach: Hristo Mladenov

| No. | Pos. | Player | Date of birth (age) | Caps | Club |
|---|---|---|---|---|---|
| 1 | GK | Rumyancho Goranov | 17 March 1950 (aged 24) | 21 | (Bulgaria) Lokomotiv Sofia |
| 2 | DF | Ivan Zafirov | 30 December 1947 (aged 26) | 30 | (Bulgaria) CSKA SZ Sofia |
| 3 | DF | Dobromir Zhechev | 12 November 1942 (aged 31) | 73 | (Bulgaria) Levski-Spartak Sofia |
| 4 | DF | Stefko Velichkov | 15 February 1949 (aged 25) | 22 | (Bulgaria) Etar Veliko Tarnovo |
| 5 | MF | Bozhil Kolev | 20 May 1949 (aged 25) | 35 | (Bulgaria) CSKA SZ Sofia |
| 6 | DF | Dimitar Penev | 12 July 1945 (aged 28) | 83 | (Bulgaria) CSKA SZ Sofia |
| 7 | FW | Voyn Voynov | 7 September 1952 (aged 21) | 11 | (Bulgaria) Levski-Spartak Sofia |
| 8 | MF | Hristo Bonev (captain) | 3 February 1947 (aged 27) | 68 | (Bulgaria) DFS Lokomotiv Plovdiv |
| 9 | FW | Atanas Mihailov | 5 July 1949 (aged 24) | 40 | (Bulgaria) Lokomotiv Sofia |
| 10 | MF | Ivan Stoyanov | 20 January 1949 (aged 25) | 18 | (Bulgaria) Levski-Spartak Sofia |
| 11 | FW | Georgi Denev | 18 April 1950 (aged 24) | 29 | (Bulgaria) CSKA SZ Sofia |
| 12 | DF | Stefan Aladzhov | 18 October 1947 (aged 26) | 27 | (Bulgaria) Levski-Spartak Sofia |
| 13 | FW | Mladen Vasilev | 29 July 1947 (aged 26) | 25 | (Bulgaria) Akademik Sofia |
| 14 | FW | Kiril Milanov | 17 October 1948 (aged 25) | 9 | (Bulgaria) Levski-Spartak Sofia |
| 15 | FW | Pavel Panov | 14 September 1950 (aged 23) | 10 | (Bulgaria) Levski-Spartak Sofia |
| 16 | FW | Bozhidar Grigorov | 27 July 1945 (aged 28) | 4 | (Bulgaria) Slavia Sofia |
| 17 | MF | Asparuh Nikodimov | 21 August 1945 (aged 28) | 23 | (Bulgaria) CSKA SZ Sofia |
| 18 | DF | Tsonyo Vasilev | 7 January 1952 (aged 22) | 6 | (Bulgaria) CSKA SZ Sofia |
| 19 | DF | Kiril Ivkov | 21 June 1946 (aged 27) | 22 | (Bulgaria) Levski-Spartak Sofia |
| 20 | FW | Krasimir Borisov | 8 April 1950 (aged 24) | 7 | (Bulgaria) Levski-Spartak Sofia |
| 21 | GK | Stefan Staykov | 3 October 1949 (aged 24) | 5 | (Bulgaria) Levski-Spartak Sofia |
| 22 | GK | Simeon Simeonov | 26 April 1946 (aged 28) | 34 | (Bulgaria) Slavia Sofia |

== Group 4 ==
=== Poland ===
Like Switzerland in 1954 and Portugal in 1966, the Poland squad was ordered by position: goalkeepers were assigned numbers 1 to 3, defenders 4 to 10 and so on. The only exception was midfielder Henryk Wieczorek, who wore number 7.

Head coach: Kazimierz Górski

| No. | Pos. | Player | Date of birth (age) | Caps | Club |
|---|---|---|---|---|---|
| 1 | GK | Andrzej Fischer | 15 January 1952 (aged 22) | 1 | (Poland) Górnik Zabrze |
| 2 | GK | Jan Tomaszewski | 9 January 1948 (aged 26) | 14 | (Poland) ŁKS Łódź |
| 3 | GK | Zygmunt Kalinowski | 2 May 1949 (aged 25) | 4 | (Poland) Śląsk Wrocław |
| 4 | DF | Antoni Szymanowski | 13 January 1951 (aged 23) | 28 | (Poland) Wisła Kraków |
| 5 | DF | Zbigniew Gut | 17 April 1949 (aged 25) | 9 | (Poland) Odra Opole |
| 6 | DF | Jerzy Gorgoń | 18 July 1949 (aged 24) | 31 | (Poland) Górnik Zabrze |
| 7 | DF | Henryk Wieczorek | 14 December 1949 (aged 24) | 3 | (Poland) Górnik Zabrze |
| 8 | DF | Mirosław Bulzacki | 23 October 1951 (aged 22) | 16 | (Poland) ŁKS Łódź |
| 9 | DF | Władysław Żmuda | 6 June 1954 (aged 20) | 2 | (Poland) Gwardia Warszawa |
| 10 | DF | Adam Musiał | 18 December 1948 (aged 25) | 25 | (Poland) Wisła Kraków |
| 11 | MF | Lesław Ćmikiewicz | 25 August 1948 (aged 25) | 32 | (Poland) Legia Warsaw |
| 12 | MF | Kazimierz Deyna (captain) | 23 October 1947 (aged 26) | 49 | (Poland) Legia Warsaw |
| 13 | MF | Henryk Kasperczak | 10 July 1946 (aged 27) | 17 | (Poland) Stal Mielec |
| 14 | MF | Zygmunt Maszczyk | 3 May 1945 (aged 29) | 16 | (Poland) Ruch Chorzów |
| 15 | MF | Roman Jakóbczak | 26 February 1946 (aged 28) | 1 | (Poland) Lech Poznań |
| 16 | FW | Grzegorz Lato | 8 April 1950 (aged 24) | 13 | (Poland) Stal Mielec |
| 17 | FW | Andrzej Szarmach | 3 October 1950 (aged 23) | 6 | (Poland) Górnik Zabrze |
| 18 | FW | Robert Gadocha | 10 January 1946 (aged 28) | 49 | (Poland) Legia Warsaw |
| 19 | FW | Jan Domarski | 28 October 1946 (aged 27) | 13 | (Poland) Stal Mielec |
| 20 | FW | Zdzisław Kapka | 7 December 1954 (aged 19) | 2 | (Poland) Wisła Kraków |
| 21 | FW | Kazimierz Kmiecik | 19 September 1951 (aged 22) | 9 | (Poland) Wisła Kraków |
| 22 | FW | Marek Kusto | 29 April 1954 (aged 20) | 1 | (Poland) Wisła Kraków |

=== Italy ===
Head coach: Ferruccio Valcareggi

| No. | Pos. | Player | Date of birth (age) | Caps | Club |
|---|---|---|---|---|---|
| 1 | GK | Dino Zoff | 28 February 1942 (aged 32) | 32 | (Italy) Juventus |
| 2 | DF | Luciano Spinosi | 9 May 1950 (aged 24) | 16 | (Italy) Juventus |
| 3 | DF | Giacinto Facchetti (captain) | 18 July 1942 (aged 31) | 73 | (Italy) Internazionale |
| 4 | MF | Romeo Benetti | 20 October 1945 (aged 28) | 15 | (Italy) Milan |
| 5 | DF | Francesco Morini | 12 August 1944 (aged 29) | 6 | (Italy) Juventus |
| 6 | DF | Tarcisio Burgnich | 25 April 1939 (aged 35) | 63 | (Italy) Internazionale |
| 7 | MF | Sandro Mazzola | 8 November 1942 (aged 31) | 67 | (Italy) Internazionale |
| 8 | MF | Fabio Capello | 18 June 1946 (aged 27) | 16 | (Italy) Juventus |
| 9 | FW | Giorgio Chinaglia | 24 January 1947 (aged 27) | 9 | (Italy) Lazio |
| 10 | MF | Gianni Rivera | 18 August 1943 (aged 30) | 58 | (Italy) Milan |
| 11 | FW | Gigi Riva | 7 November 1944 (aged 29) | 40 | (Italy) Cagliari |
| 12 | GK | Enrico Albertosi | 2 November 1939 (aged 34) | 34 | (Italy) Cagliari |
| 13 | DF | Giuseppe Sabadini | 26 March 1949 (aged 25) | 4 | (Italy) Milan |
| 14 | DF | Mauro Bellugi | 7 February 1950 (aged 24) | 7 | (Italy) Internazionale |
| 15 | DF | Giuseppe Wilson | 27 October 1945 (aged 28) | 1 | (Italy) Lazio |
| 16 | MF | Antonio Juliano | 26 December 1942 (aged 31) | 17 | (Italy) Napoli |
| 17 | MF | Luciano Re Cecconi | 1 December 1948 (aged 25) | 0 | (Italy) Lazio |
| 18 | MF | Franco Causio | 1 February 1949 (aged 25) | 10 | (Italy) Juventus |
| 19 | FW | Pietro Anastasi | 7 April 1948 (aged 26) | 20 | (Italy) Juventus |
| 20 | FW | Roberto Boninsegna | 13 November 1943 (aged 30) | 18 | (Italy) Internazionale |
| 21 | FW | Paolo Pulici | 27 April 1950 (aged 24) | 3 | (Italy) Torino |
| 22 | GK | Luciano Castellini | 12 December 1945 (aged 28) | 0 | (Italy) Torino |

=== Argentina ===
Head coach: Vladislao Cap

| No. | Pos. | Player | Date of birth (age) | Caps | Club |
|---|---|---|---|---|---|
| 1 | GK | Daniel Carnevali | 4 December 1946 (aged 27) | 14 | (Spain) Las Palmas |
| 2 | FW | Rubén Ayala | 8 January 1950 (aged 24) | 15 | (Spain) Atlético Madrid |
| 3 | MF | Carlos Babington | 20 September 1949 (aged 24) | 7 | (Argentina) Huracán |
| 4 | MF | Agustín Balbuena | 1 September 1945 (aged 28) | 6 | (Argentina) Independiente |
| 5 | DF | Ángel Bargas | 29 October 1946 (aged 27) | 20 | (France) Nantes |
| 6 | MF | Miguel Ángel Brindisi | 8 October 1950 (aged 23) | 31 | (Argentina) Huracán |
| 7 | DF | Jorge Carrascosa | 15 August 1948 (aged 25) | 7 | (Argentina) Huracán |
| 8 | MF | Enrique Chazarreta | 29 July 1947 (aged 26) | 7 | (Argentina) San Lorenzo |
| 9 | DF | Rubén Glaria | 10 March 1948 (aged 26) | 4 | (Argentina) San Lorenzo |
| 10 | DF | Ramón Heredia | 26 February 1951 (aged 23) | 18 | (Spain) Atlético Madrid |
| 11 | FW | René Houseman | 19 July 1953 (aged 20) | 7 | (Argentina) Huracán |
| 12 | GK | Ubaldo Fillol | 21 July 1950 (aged 23) | 0 | (Argentina) River Plate |
| 13 | FW | Mario Kempes | 15 July 1954 (aged 19) | 5 | (Argentina) Rosario Central |
| 14 | DF | Roberto Perfumo (captain) | 3 October 1942 (aged 31) | 34 | (Brazil) Cruzeiro |
| 15 | MF | Aldo Poy | 14 September 1945 (aged 28) | 1 | (Argentina) Rosario Central |
| 16 | DF | Francisco Sá | 25 October 1945 (aged 28) | 7 | (Argentina) Independiente |
| 17 | MF | Carlos Squeo | 4 June 1948 (aged 26) | 4 | (Argentina) Racing |
| 18 | MF | Roberto Telch | 6 November 1943 (aged 30) | 17 | (Argentina) San Lorenzo |
| 19 | DF | Néstor Togneri | 27 November 1942 (aged 31) | 1 | (Argentina) Estudiantes La Plata |
| 20 | DF | Enrique Wolff | 21 February 1949 (aged 25) | 16 | (Argentina) River Plate |
| 21 | GK | Miguel Ángel Santoro | 27 February 1942 (aged 32) | 13 | (Argentina) Independiente |
| 22 | FW | Héctor Yazalde | 29 May 1946 (aged 28) | 12 | (Portugal) Sporting CP |

Note that this squad is numbered alphabetically by surname, with the exception of the goalkeepers which received traditional numbers 1, 12 and 21.

=== Haiti ===
Head coach: Antoine Tassy

| No. | Pos. | Player | Date of birth (age) | Caps | Club |
|---|---|---|---|---|---|
| 1 | GK | Henri Françillon | 26 May 1946 (aged 28) | 1 | (Haiti) Victory |
| 2 | GK | Wilner Piquant | 12 October 1949 (aged 24) | 0 | (Haiti) Violette |
| 3 | DF | Arsène Auguste | 3 February 1951 (aged 23) | 1 | (Haiti) Racing Club Haïtien |
| 4 | DF | Fritz André | 18 September 1946 (aged 27) | 0 | (Haiti) Violette |
| 5 | DF | Serge Ducosté | 4 February 1944 (aged 30) | 0 | (Haiti) Aigle Noir |
| 6 | DF | Pierre Bayonne | 11 June 1949 (aged 25) | 1 | (Haiti) Violette |
| 7 | MF | Philippe Vorbe | 14 September 1947 (aged 26) | 1 | (Haiti) Violette |
| 8 | MF | Jean-Claude Désir | 8 August 1946 (aged 27) | 1 | (Haiti) Aigle Noir |
| 9 | MF | Eddy Antoine | 27 August 1949 (aged 24) | 1 | (Haiti) Racing Club Haïtien |
| 10 | MF | Guy François | 18 September 1947 (aged 26) | 0 | (Haiti) Violette |
| 11 | FW | Guy Saint-Vil | 21 October 1942 (aged 31) | 1 | (Haiti) Racing Club Haïtien |
| 12 | DF | Ernst Jean-Joseph | 11 June 1948 (aged 26) | 1 | (Haiti) Violette |
| 13 | DF | Serge Racine | 9 October 1951 (aged 22) | 1 | (Haiti) Aigle Noir |
| 14 | DF | Wilner Nazaire (captain) | 30 March 1950 (aged 24) | 0 | (France) Valenciennes |
| 15 | FW | Roger Saint-Vil | 8 December 1949 (aged 24) | 1 | (Haiti) Violette |
| 16 | FW | Fritz Leandré | 13 March 1948 (aged 26) | 0 | (Haiti) Racing Club Haïtien |
| 17 | MF | Joseph-Marion Leandré | 9 May 1945 (aged 29) | 1 | (Haiti) Racing Club Haïtien |
| 18 | FW | Claude Barthélemy | 9 May 1945 (aged 29) | 1 | (Haiti) Racing Club Haïtien |
| 19 | DF | Jean-Herbert Austin | 23 February 1950 (aged 24) | ? | (Haiti) Violette |
| 20 | FW | Emmanuel Sanon | 25 June 1951 (aged 22) | 1 | (Haiti) Don Bosco |
| 21 | DF | Wilfried Louis | 25 October 1949 (aged 24) | ? | (Haiti) Don Bosco |
| 22 | GK | Gérard Joseph | 22 October 1949 (aged 24) | ? | (Haiti) Racing Club Haïtien |

== Coaches representation by country ==
| Nº | Country | Coaches |
|---|---|---|
| 3 | (Socialist Federal Republic of Yugoslavia) Yugoslavia | Miljan Miljanić, Rale Rasic (Australia), Blagoje Vidinić (Zaire) |
| 1 | Argentina | Vladislao Cap |
| 1 | Brazil | Mário Zagallo |
| 1 | Bulgaria | Hristo Mladenov |
| 1 | Chile | Luis Alamos |
| 1 | East Germany | Georg Buschner |
| 1 | Haiti | Antoine Tassy |
| 1 | Italy | Ferruccio Valcareggi |
| 1 | Netherlands | Rinus Michels |
| 1 | Poland | Kazimierz Górski |
| 1 | Scotland | Willie Ormond |
| 1 | Sweden | Georg Ericson |
| 1 | Uruguay | Roberto Porta |
| 1 | West Germany | Helmut Schön |
