= 1974 FIFA World Cup Group 3 =

Football tournament group stage

Group 3 of the 1974 FIFA World Cup was contested between 15 and 23 June 1974. Matches were played in three cities: Dortmund, Hanover and Düsseldorf.

The pool comprised Uruguay (Pot 3-South America), Bulgaria (Pot 2-Eastern Europe), Netherlands (Pot 1-Western Europe) and Sweden (Pot 4-Rest of the world).

== Standings ==
Pos	Team	Pld	W	D	L	GF	GA	GD	Pts	Qualification
1	Netherlands	3	2	1	0	6	1	+5	5	Advance to second round
2	Sweden	3	1	2	0	3	0	+3	4	Advance to second round
3	Bulgaria	3	0	2	1	2	5	−3	2	
4	Uruguay	3	0	1	2	1	6	−5	1	

Source: FIFA

== Matches ==
All times listed are local (CET)

=== Uruguay vs Netherlands ===
15 June 1974
16:00 CET

Uruguay	0–2	Netherlands
		Rep 7', 86'

Niedersachsenstadion, Hanover
Attendance: 55,100
Referee: Károly Palotai (Hungary)

Uruguay	Netherlands

GK	1	Ladislao Mazurkiewicz
RB	4	Pablo Forlán	(yellow card) 50'
CB	2	Baudilio Jáuregui
CB	3	Juan Masnik (c)	(yellow card) 65'
LB	6	Ricardo Pavoni
RM	18	Walter Mantegazza	(yellow card) 25'
CM	5	Julio Montero Castillo	(red card) 69'
LM	8	Víctor Espárrago
RF	7	Luis Cubilla		(substituted off) 64'
CF	9	Fernando Morena
LF	10	Pedro Rocha
Substitutions:
FW	19	Denis Milar		(substituted on) 64'
Manager:
Roberto Porta

GK	8	Jan Jongbloed
RB	20	Wim Suurbier
CB	2	Arie Haan
CB	17	Wim Rijsbergen
LB	12	Ruud Krol
CM	13	Johan Neeskens
CM	6	Wim Jansen
CM	3	Willem van Hanegem
RW	16	Johnny Rep
LW	15	Rob Rensenbrink
CF	14	Johan Cruyff (c)
Manager:
Rinus Michels

Assistant referees:
Pavel Kazakov (Soviet Union)
Nicolae Rainea (Romania)

=== Sweden vs Bulgaria ===
15 June 1974
16:00 CET

Sweden	0–0	Bulgaria

Rheinstadion, Düsseldorf
Attendance: 23,800
Referee: Edison Peréz Núñez (Peru)

Sweden	Bulgaria

GK	1	Ronnie Hellström
SW	7	Bo Larsson (c)
RB	2	Jan Olsson
CB	3	Kent Karlsson
LB	5	Björn Andersson
CM	6	Ove Grahn
CM	14	Staffan Tapper
AM	9	Ove Kindvall	(substituted off) 73'
RW	8	Conny Torstensson
CF	10	Ralf Edström
CF	11	Roland Sandberg
Substitutions:
RW	15	Benno Magnusson	(substituted on) 73'
Manager:
Georg Ericson

GK	1	Rumyancho Goranov
RB	18	Tsonyo Vasilev
CB	19	Kiril Ivkov
CB	6	Dimitar Penev
LB	4	Stefan Velichkov
CM	5	Bozhil Kolev
CM	17	Asparuh Nikodimov
AM	8	Hristo Bonev (c)
RW	7	Voyn Voynov	(substituted off) 75'
LW	11	Georgi Denev
CF	15	Pavel Panov	(substituted off) 73'
Substitutions:
RW	13	Mladen Vasilev	(substituted on) 73'
CF	9	Atanas Mihailov	(substituted on) 75'
Manager:
Hristo Mladenov

Assistant referees:
Alfonso González Archundía (Mexico)
Govindasamy Suppiah (Singapore)

=== Bulgaria vs Uruguay ===
19 June 1974
19:30 CET

Bulgaria	1–1	Uruguay
Bonev 75'		Pavoni 87'

Niedersachsenstadion, Hanover
Attendance: 13,400
Referee: Jack Taylor (England)

Bulgaria	Uruguay

GK	1	Rumyancho Goranov
RB	18	Tsonyo Vasilev	(yellow card) 9'
CB	19	Kiril Ivkov
CB	6	Dimitar Penev
LB	4	Stefan Velichkov
CM	5	Bozhil Kolev
CM	17	Asparuh Nikodimov		(substituted off) 59'
AM	8	Hristo Bonev (c)
RW	7	Voyn Voynov
LW	11	Georgi Denev
CF	15	Pavel Panov
Substitutions:
FW	9	Atanas Mihailov		(substituted on) 59'
Manager:
Hristo Mladenov

GK	1	Ladislao Mazurkiewicz (c)
RB	4	Pablo Forlán
CB	2	Baudilio Jáuregui
CB	14	Luis Garisto		(substituted off) 73'
LB	6	Ricardo Pavoni
CM	18	Walter Mantegazza		(substituted off) 62'
CM	8	Víctor Espárrago	(yellow card) 44'
CM	10	Pedro Rocha
RW	19	Denis Milar
LW	11	Rubén Corbo
CF	9	Fernando Morena
Substitutions:
CM	16	Alberto Cardaccio		(substituted on) 62'
CB	3	Juan Masnik		(substituted on) 73'
Manager:
Roberto Porta

Assistant referees:
Doğan Babacan (Turkey)
Klaus Ohmsen (West Germany)

=== Netherlands vs Sweden ===
19 June 1974
19:30 CET

Netherlands	0–0	Sweden

Westfalenstadion, Dortmund
Attendance: 53,700
Referee: Werner Winsemann (Canada)

Netherlands	Sweden

GK	8	Jan Jongbloed
RB	20	Wim Suurbier
CB	2	Arie Haan
CB	17	Wim Rijsbergen
LB	12	Ruud Krol
CM	13	Johan Neeskens
CM	6	Wim Jansen
CM	3	Willem van Hanegem		(substituted off) 73'
RW	16	Johnny Rep	(yellow card) 72'
LW	9	Piet Keizer
CF	14	Johan Cruyff (c)
Substitutions:
CM	7	Theo de Jong		(substituted on) 73'
Manager:
Rinus Michels

GK	1	Ronnie Hellström
SW	4	Björn Nordqvist	(yellow card) 36'
RB	2	Jan Olsson		(substituted off) 75'
CB	3	Kent Karlsson
LB	5	Björn Andersson	(yellow card) 74'
CM	14	Staffan Tapper		(substituted off) 61'
CM	7	Bo Larsson (c)
AM	6	Ove Grahn	(yellow card) 86'
RW	16	Inge Ejderstedt
CF	10	Ralf Edström
CF	11	Roland Sandberg
Substitutions:
CM	21	Örjan Persson	(yellow card) 68'	(substituted on) 61'
LB	13	Roland Grip		(substituted on) 75'
Manager:
Georg Ericson

Assistant referees:
Kurt Tschenscher (West Germany)
Clive Thomas (Wales)

=== Bulgaria vs Netherlands ===
23 June 1974
16:00 CET

Bulgaria	1–4	Netherlands
Krol 78' (o.g.)		Neeskens 5' (pen.), 45' (pen.); Rep 71'; De Jong 88'

Westfalenstadion, Dortmund
Attendance: 53,300
Referee: Tony Boskovic (Australia)

Bulgaria	Netherlands

GK	21	Stefan Staykov
SW	19	Kiril Ivkov
RB	18	Tsonyo Vasilev
CB	6	Dimitar Penev
LB	4	Stefan Velichkov	(yellow card) 45'
CM	5	Bozhil Kolev
CM	10	Ivan Stoyanov		(substituted off) 46'
AM	8	Hristo Bonev (c)
RW	7	Voyn Voynov
LW	11	Georgi Denev	(yellow card) 67'
CF	15	Pavel Panov		(substituted off) 57'
Substitutions:
ST	9	Atanas Mihaylov		(substituted on) 46'
CM	20	Krasimir Borisov		(substituted on) 57'
Manager:
Hristo Mladenov

GK	8	Jan Jongbloed
RB	20	Wim Suurbier
CB	2	Arie Haan
CB	17	Wim Rijsbergen
LB	12	Ruud Krol
CM	13	Johan Neeskens		(substituted off) 79'
CM	6	Wim Jansen	(yellow card) 5'
CM	3	Willem van Hanegem	(yellow card) 28'	(substituted off) 46'
RW	16	Johnny Rep
LW	15	Rob Rensenbrink
CF	14	Johan Cruyff (c)	(yellow card) 29'
Substitutions:
CB	5	Rinus Israël		(substituted on) 46'
CM	7	Theo de Jong		(substituted on) 79'
Manager:
Rinus Michels

Assistant referees:
Ferdinand Biwersi (West Germany)
Walter Eschweiler (West Germany)

=== Sweden vs Uruguay ===
23 June 1974
16:00 CET

Sweden	3–0	Uruguay
Edström 46', 77'; Sandberg 74'

Rheinstadion, Düsseldorf
Attendance: 28,300
Referee: Erich Linemayr (Austria)

Sweden	Uruguay

GK	1	Ronnie Hellström
SW	4	Björn Nordqvist
RB	5	Björn Andersson
CB	3	Kent Karlsson
LB	13	Roland Grip
CM	6	Ove Grahn
CM	7	Bo Larsson (c)
AM	9	Ove Kindvall	(substituted off) 76'
RW	15	Benno Magnusson	(substituted off) 60'
CF	10	Ralf Edström
CF	11	Roland Sandberg
Substitutions:
FW	22	Thomas Ahlström	(substituted on) 60'
MF	8	Conny Torstensson	(substituted on) 76'
Manager:
Georg Ericson

GK	1	Ladislao Mazurkiewicz (c)
RB	4	Pablo Forlán
CB	2	Baudilio Jáuregui	(yellow card) 21'
CB	14	Luis Garisto		(substituted off) 46'
LB	6	Ricardo Pavoni
CM	18	Walter Mantegazza
CM	8	Víctor Espárrago
CM	10	Pedro Rocha
RW	19	Denis Milar
LW	11	Rubén Corbo		(substituted off) 43'
CF	9	Fernando Morena
Substitutions:
RW	7	Luis Cubilla		(substituted on) 43'
CB	3	Juan Masnik		(substituted on) 46'
Manager:
Roberto Porta

Assistant referees:
Vicente Llobregat (Venezuela)
Heinz Aldinger (West Germany)

== See also ==
- Bulgaria at the FIFA World Cup
- Netherlands at the FIFA World Cup
- Sweden at the FIFA World Cup
- Uruguay at the FIFA World Cup
