= 1972–73 Bulgarian Cup =

Tournament details
- Country: Bulgaria

Final positions
- Champions: CSKA Sofia (8th cup)
- Runners-up: Beroe Stara Zagora

Tournament statistics
- Top goal scorer(s): Petar Zhekov (CSKA); Petko Petkov (Beroe) (8 goals)

The 1972–73 Bulgarian Cup was the 33rd season of the Bulgarian Cup (in this period the tournament was named Cup of the Soviet Army). CSKA Sofia won the competition, beating Beroe Stara Zagora 2–1 in the final at the Vasil Levski National Stadium.

== Preliminary round ==
Team 1	Score	Team 2
1972
Levski Omurtag	2–0	Lokomotiv Ruse
Dobrudzha Dobrich	1–2	Beloslav
Ludogorets Razgrad	1–2	Lokomotiv GO
Botev Dibich	0–1	Dorostol Silistra
Arda Kardzhali	1–2	Sliven
Sakarski Sportist	0–2	Lokomotiv Burgas
Cherveno Zname Haskovo	3–3 (a.e.t.) (10–11 p)	Gorubso Madan
Hebar Pazardzhik	3–1	Velbazhd Kyustendil
Lokomotiv Stara Zagora	0–2 (a.e.t.)	Yantra Gabrovo
Chavdar Etropole	2–0	Svoboda Milkovitsa
Chorni Breznik	0–2	Trakia Stamboliyski
Pirin Blagoevgrad	3–0	Vitosha Bistritsa
Montana	0–0 (a.e.t.) (3–2 p)	Litex Lovech

== First round ==
Team 1	Score	Team 2
20–21 December 1972
Bdin Vidin	2–0	Lokomotiv Sofia
Pirin Blagoevgrad	4–2	Tundzha Yambol
Beroe Stara Zagora	1–0	Trakia Stamboliyski
Lokomotiv Burgas	1–2	Botev Plovdiv
Gorubso Madan	1–4	Spartak Pleven
Dunav Ruse	2–1	Hebar Pazardzhik
Minyor Pernik	3–1	Beloslav
Cherno More Varna	0–1	Spartak Varna
CSKA Sofia	6–0	Yantra Gabrovo
Lokomotiv Plovdiv	4–2	Lokomotiv GO
Levski Omurtag	0–3	Etar Veliko Tarnovo
Akademik Sofia	2–0	Dorostol Silistra
Chavdar Etropole	1–4 (a.e.t.)	Botev Vratsa
Slavia Sofia	2–1	Montana
Levski Sofia	2–0	Sliven
Chernomorets Burgas	1–0	Shumen

== Group stage ==
=== Group 1 ===
Matches were played in Haskovo, Dimitrovgrad and Parvomay

Team 1	Score	Team 2
10–17 February 1973
Minyor Pernik	1–1	Lokomotiv Plovdiv
Akademik Sofia	1–1	Chernomorets Burgas
Lokomotiv Plovdiv	1–1	Chernomorets Burgas
Minyor Pernik	1–1	Akademik Sofia
Akademik Sofia	2–1	Lokomotiv Plovdiv
Chernomorets Burgas	2–0	Minyor Pernik

Pos	Team	Pld	W	D	L	GF	GA	GD	Pts	Qualification
1	Chernomorets Burgas	3	1	2	0	4	2	+2	4	Quarter-finals
2	Akademik Sofia	3	1	2	0	4	3	+1	4	Quarter-finals
3	Lokomotiv Plovdiv	3	0	2	1	3	4	−1	2	
4	Minyor Pernik	3	0	2	1	2	4	−2	2	

=== Group 2 ===
Matches were played in Panagyurishte, Velingrad, Stamboliyski and Pazardzhik

Team 1	Score	Team 2
10–17 February 1973
Bdin Vidin	1–2	CSKA Sofia
Beroe Stara Zagora	2–0	Spartak Varna
CSKA Sofia	5–1	Spartak Varna
Bdin Vidin	2–5	Beroe Stara Zagora
Beroe Stara Zagora	0–2	CSKA Sofia
Spartak Varna	0–2	Bdin Vidin

Pos	Team	Pld	W	D	L	GF	GA	GD	Pts	Qualification
1	CSKA Sofia	3	3	0	0	9	2	+7	6	Quarter-finals
2	Beroe Stara Zagora	3	2	0	1	7	4	+3	4	Quarter-finals
3	Bdin Vidin	3	1	0	2	5	7	−2	2	
4	Spartak Varna	3	0	0	3	1	9	−8	0	

=== Group 3 ===
Matches were played in Petrich, Sandanski, Razlog and Gotse Delchev

Team 1	Score	Team 2
10–17 February 1973
Levski Sofia	2–1	Spartak Pleven
Botev Plovdiv	2–0	Botev Vratsa
Levski Sofia	0–0	Botev Plovdiv
Spartak Pleven	0–1	Botev Vratsa
Botev Vratsa	0–1	Levski Sofia
Botev Plovdiv	2–1	Spartak Pleven

Pos	Team	Pld	W	D	L	GF	GA	GD	Pts	Qualification
1	Botev Plovdiv	3	2	1	0	4	1	+3	5	Quarter-finals
2	Levski Sofia	3	2	1	0	3	1	+2	5	Quarter-finals
3	Botev Vratsa	3	1	0	2	1	3	−2	2	
4	Spartak Pleven	3	0	0	3	2	5	−3	0	

=== Group 4 ===
Matches were played in Nova Zagora, Kazanlak, Stara Zagora and Chirpan

Team 1	Score	Team 2
10–17 February 1973
Etar Veliko Tarnovo	0–0	Slavia Sofia
Pirin Blagoevgrad	0–2	Dunav Ruse
Slavia Sofia	1–1	Dunav Ruse
Etar Veliko Tarnovo	1–0	Pirin Blagoevgrad
Pirin Blagoevgrad	0–3	Slavia Sofia
Dunav Ruse	3–2	Etar Veliko Tarnovo

Pos	Team	Pld	W	D	L	GF	GA	GD	Pts	Qualification
1	Dunav Ruse	3	2	1	0	6	3	+3	5	Quarter-finals
2	Slavia Sofia	3	1	2	0	4	1	+3	4	Quarter-finals
3	Etar Veliko Tarnovo	3	1	1	1	3	3	0	3	
4	Pirin Blagoevgrad	3	0	0	3	0	6	−6	0	

== Quarter-finals ==
Team 1	Score	Team 2	Place
14 March 1973
CSKA Sofia	1–0	Slavia Sofia	Sofia
Akademik Sofia	2–1	Botev Plovdiv	Haskovo
Levski Sofia	2–1	Chernomorets Burgas	Pazardzhik
Beroe Stara Zagora	3–1	Dunav Ruse	Veliko Tarnovo

== Semi-finals ==
Team 1	Score	Team 2	Place
23 May 1973
CSKA Sofia	4–2 (a.e.t.)	Akademik Sofia	Sofia
Beroe Stara Zagora	2–1	Levski Sofia	Plovdiv

== Final ==
=== Details ===
3 June 1973

CSKA Sofia	2−1	Beroe Stara Zagora
Denev 18'; Zhekov 21'		D. Dimitrov 12'

Vasil Levski National Stadium, Sofia
Attendance: 18,000
Referee: Petar Nikolov (Sofia)

CSKA	Beroe
