= 1974–75 A Group =

31st season of top-tier football league in Bulgaria

A Group
- Season: 1974–75
- Champions: CSKA Sofia (18th title)
- Relegated: Etar; Yantra
- European Cup: CSKA
- UEFA Cup: Levski; Dunav
- Matches played: 240
- Goals scored: 675 (2.81 per match)
- Top goalscorer: Ivan Pritargov (20 goals)

The 1974–75 A Group was the 27th season of the A Football Group, the top Bulgarian professional league for association football clubs, since its establishment in 1948.

== Overview ==
It was contested by 16 teams, and CSKA Sofia won the championship.

== League standings ==
Pos	Team	Pld	W	D	L	GF	GA	GD	Pts	Qualification or relegation
1	CSKA Sofia (C)	30	15	9	6	52	32	+20	39	Qualification for European Cup first round
2	Levski Sofia	30	15	8	7	54	30	+24	38	Qualification for UEFA Cup first round
3	Slavia Sofia	30	15	6	9	56	35	+21	36	Qualification for Cup Winners' Cup first round
4	Dunav Ruse	30	15	5	10	41	28	+13	35	Qualification for UEFA Cup first round
5	Akademik Sofia	30	14	7	9	39	33	+6	35	
6	Lokomotiv Plovdiv	30	12	9	9	49	44	+5	33	
7	Lokomotiv Sofia	30	12	7	11	53	43	+10	31	
8	Sliven	30	10	10	10	42	45	−3	30	
9	Spartak Pleven	30	9	10	11	34	45	−11	28	
10	Botev Plovdiv	30	12	4	14	41	55	−14	28	
11	Botev Vratsa	30	9	9	12	46	49	−3	27	
12	Pirin Blagoevgrad	30	11	5	14	31	42	−11	27	
13	Minyor Pernik	30	11	4	15	36	45	−9	26	
14	Cherno More Varna	30	9	8	13	28	43	−15	26	
15	Etar Veliko Tarnovo (R)	30	8	5	17	43	56	−13	21	Relegation to 1975–76 B Group
16	Yantra Gabrovo (R)	30	7	6	17	30	50	−20	20	Relegation to 1975–76 B Group

Source: rsssf.com
(C) Champions; (R) Relegated

== Results ==
Home \ Away	AKD	BPD	BVR	CHM	CSK	DUN	ETA	LEV	LPL	LSO	MIN	PIR	SLA	SLI	SPL	YAN
Akademik Sofia		3–1	1–1	3–1	0–0	1–0	2–1	3–1	1–1	1–0	4–0	0–1	0–3	1–2	1–0	3–0
Botev Plovdiv	0–1		0–0	3–0	1–0	2–3	2–1	1–0	0–1	1–0	2–0	3–1	2–1	3–3	4–1	1–0
Botev Vratsa	4–2	2–3		2–2	1–1	0–1	3–2	3–2	3–0	4–2	1–2	2–0	1–1	1–0	4–1	3–1
Cherno More	1–0	1–1	1–0		1–0	0–1	1–0	0–2	2–3	2–1	2–0	1–0	1–2	1–1	0–0	1–0
CSKA Sofia	0–0	4–1	1–0	3–1		2–0	3–2	1–0	2–2	1–2	2–0	3–0	1–1	3–1	2–0	5–3
Dunav Ruse	1–0	3–0	0–0	0–1	1–0		3–2	1–1	2–0	2–1	2–0	1–2	1–1	3–0	4–1	2–0
Etar Veliko Tarnovo	1–1	4–1	1–1	4–2	2–2	1–2		0–4	2–0	1–1	1–0	4–1	0–2	2–1	2–0	3–2
Levski Sofia	2–0	2–2	0–0	3–1	1–2	4–2	2–0		2–0	2–1	4–1	0–0	2–0	3–0	3–2	4–1
Lokomotiv Plovdiv	2–2	7–3	4–3	2–2	2–1	2–1	3–2	2–1		1–1	5–0	2–0	1–3	3–2	0–0	4–1
Lokomotiv Sofia	1–2	2–1	3–2	2–0	3–3	1–1	2–1	1–3	1–0		3–0	0–1	2–0	2–2	2–0	6–0
Minyor Pernik	2–0	1–0	4–1	1–1	1–2	1–0	3–0	1–1	0–0	3–1		4–1	0–0	5–1	2–0	0–1
Pirin Blagoevgrad	1–3	4–1	2–0	4–0	2–1	0–0	2–1	0–0	1–1	1–2	2–0		1–0	4–0	0–0	0–2
Slavia Sofia	5–1	3–1	5–0	1–0	1–3	1–3	5–1	2–1	2–0	2–5	4–1	4–0		2–1	2–3	2–0
Sliven	0–1	2–0	2–2	2–0	0–0	1–0	1–1	0–0	2–0	5–4	2–0	3–0	1–1		3–1	2–0
Spartak Pleven	1–1	0–1	3–2	1–1	3–3	2–1	2–1	2–2	1–0	1–1	2–0	1–0	2–0	1–1		2–1
Yantra Gabrovo	0–1	5–0	2–0	1–1	0–1	1–0	2–0	1–2	1–1	0–0	0–4	3–0	0–0	1–1	1–1	

Source: A PFG (in Bulgarian)
Legend: Blue = home team win; Yellow = draw; Red = away team win.

== Champions ==
CSKA Sofia

Goalkeepers
(Bulgaria) Stoyan Yordanov	15	(0)
(Bulgaria) Yordan Filipov	18	(0)

Defenders
(Bulgaria) Kiril Stankov	19	(0)
(Bulgaria) Dimitar Penev	28	(2)
(Bulgaria) Ivan Zafirov	20	(0)
(Bulgaria) Todor Simov	3	(0)
(Bulgaria) Kiril Lyubomirov	5	(0)
(Bulgaria) Bozhil Kolev	28	(12)
(Bulgaria) Stefan Velichkov	22	(1)
(Bulgaria) Tsonyo Vasilev	24	(0)

Midfielders
(Bulgaria) Borislav Sredkov	19	(1)
(Bulgaria) Asparuh Nikodimov	21	(2)
(Bulgaria) Plamen Yankov	24	(0)
(Bulgaria) Georgi Denev	23	(10)
(Bulgaria) Tsvetan Atanasov	14	(1)
(Bulgaria) Stoil Trankov	3	(0)
(Bulgaria) Kevork Tahmisyan	15	(1)
(Bulgaria) Angel Slavov	9	(0)
(Bulgaria) Ivan Metodiev	6	(0)

Forwards
(Bulgaria) Petar Zhekov	5	(3)
(Bulgaria) Stefan Mihaylov	28	(9)
(Bulgaria) Dimitar Marashliev	21	(7)
(Bulgaria) Yordan Hristov	12	(1)

Manager
(Bulgaria) Manol Manolov

== Top scorers ==
Rank	Scorer	Club	Goals
1	(Bulgaria) Ivan Pritargov	Botev Plovdiv	20
2	(Bulgaria) Nikola Hristov	Dunav Ruse	15
3	(Bulgaria) Andrey Zhelyazkov	Slavia Sofia	14
3	(Bulgaria) Hristo Bonev	Lokomotiv Plovdiv	14
5	(Bulgaria) Pavel Panov	Levski Sofia	13
5	(Bulgaria) Stefan Bogomilov	Cherno More Varna	13
7	(Bulgaria) Bozhil Kolev	CSKA Sofia	12
7	(Bulgaria) Chavdar Tsvetkov	Slavia Sofia	12
7	(Bulgaria) Mehmed Osmanov	Sliven	12
7	(Bulgaria) Stoyan Kotsev	Etar Veliko Tarnovo	12
