= 1979–80 A Group =

36th season of top-tier football league in Bulgaria

A Group
- Season: 1979–80
- Champions: CSKA Sofia (20th title)
- Relegated: Lokomotiv Plovdiv; Etar
- European Cup: CSKA
- UEFA Cup: Levski; Beroe
- Matches played: 240
- Goals scored: 632 (2.63 per match)
- Top goalscorer: Spas Dzhevizov (21 goals)

The 1979–80 A Group was the 32nd season of the A Football Group, the top Bulgarian professional league for association football clubs, since its establishment in 1948.

== Overview ==
It was contested by 16 teams, and CSKA Sofia won the championship.

== League standings ==
Pos	Team	Pld	W	D	L	GF	GA	GD	Pts	Qualification or relegation
1	CSKA Sofia (C)	30	18	10	2	60	30	+30	46	Qualification for European Cup first round
2	Slavia Sofia	30	21	3	6	66	27	+39	45	Qualification for Cup Winners' Cup first round
3	Levski Sofia	30	15	7	8	45	38	+7	37	Qualification for UEFA Cup first round
4	Beroe Stara Zagora	30	13	8	9	49	37	+12	34	Qualification for UEFA Cup first round
5	Trakia Plovdiv	30	14	5	11	39	38	+1	33	
6	Marek Dupnitsa	30	11	9	10	51	42	+9	31	
7	Cherno More Varna	30	9	13	8	36	33	+3	31	
8	Minyor Pernik	30	11	6	13	31	46	−15	28	
9	Chernomorets Burgas	30	12	3	15	39	42	−3	27	
10	Botev Vratsa	30	10	6	14	35	43	−8	26	
11	Lokomotiv Sofia	30	7	12	11	32	43	−11	26	
12	Pirin Blagoevgrad	30	9	7	14	27	34	−7	25	
13	Sliven	30	8	9	13	32	43	−11	25	
14	Spartak Pleven	30	7	10	13	26	39	−13	24	
15	Lokomotiv Plovdiv (R)	30	6	10	14	33	52	−19	22	Relegation to 1980–81 B Group
16	Etar Veliko Tarnovo (R)	30	7	6	17	31	45	−14	20	Relegation to 1980–81 B Group

Source: rsssf.com
(C) Champions; (R) Relegated

== Results ==
Home \ Away	BSZ	BVR	CHM	CHB	CSK	ETA	LEV	LPL	LSO	MAR	MIN	PIR	SLA	SLI	SPL	TRA
Beroe Stara Zagora		2–0	1–2	1–1	3–2	3–0	3–1	4–3	2–2	0–0	4–0	1–0	0–1	2–1	3–0	4–2
Botev Vratsa	2–0		1–1	2–0	0–1	1–0	3–1	2–0	2–0	1–2	1–1	3–1	2–2	3–0	3–1	3–2
Cherno More	0–0	0–0		2–1	1–1	2–1	0–1	1–1	4–1	2–2	1–1	1–0	0–2	2–0	3–0	2–2
Chernomorets Burgas	1–2	3–0	2–3		2–3	1–0	3–0	3–0	2–0	1–0	1–2	3–0	1–2	2–1	2–1	2–1
CSKA Sofia	1–1	1–0	2–0	1–1		6–0	1–1	3–0	2–2	1–0	3–1	3–0	1–1	1–0	2–0	3–1
Etar Veliko Tarnovo	1–0	0–0	1–1	3–0	0–1		1–2	3–1	0–2	7–1	2–0	0–0	0–1	2–1	1–0	0–1
Levski Sofia	1–0	4–2	2–2	1–0	2–3	2–0		3–0	5–1	1–1	4–1	1–0	1–0	2–2	2–2	1–0
Lokomotiv Plovdiv	3–1	1–1	1–0	1–1	2–2	1–1	0–1		1–2	1–1	5–3	3–0	0–4	0–0	1–0	0–0
Lokomotiv Sofia	1–1	4–2	0–0	3–1	1–2	0–0	2–3	0–2		1–1	2–1	0–1	0–1	0–0	2–0	1–2
Marek Dupnitsa	3–2	2–0	1–2	3–1	1–2	3–3	2–1	7–1	1–1		3–0	1–0	2–0	6–0	1–1	5–1
Minyor Pernik	1–1	2–1	1–0	0–1	1–3	2–1	2–0	2–1	0–0	2–0		1–0	2–0	0–3	1–1	1–0
Pirin Blagoevgrad	2–4	2–0	1–0	2–0	1–1	4–1	1–1	1–1	0–0	1–1	0–1		1–0	3–0	2–0	1–0
Slavia Sofia	2–0	4–0	1–1	4–0	2–1	4–3	2–0	3–2	5–1	4–1	4–1	3–1		3–1	3–0	4–0
Sliven	2–1	3–0	2–2	1–0	2–3	2–0	0–0	2–1	0–1	2–0	0–0	1–0	2–3		3–3	0–0
Spartak Pleven	1–1	2–0	2–0	1–2	1–1	1–0	0–1	0–0	2–2	1–0	3–1	1–1	1–0	0–0		1–0
Trakia Plovdiv	1–2	1–0	2–1	2–1	3–3	2–0	4–0	1–0	0–0	2–0	1–0	2–1	2–1	3–1	1–0	

Source: A PFG (in Bulgarian)
Legend: Blue = home team win; Yellow = draw; Red = away team win.

== Champions ==
CSKA Sofia

Goalkeepers
(Bulgaria) Georgi Velinov	21	(0)
(Bulgaria) Yordan Filipov	9	(0)

Defenders
(Bulgaria) Georgi Dimitrov	23	(1)
(Bulgaria) Tsonyo Vasilev	21	(0)
(Bulgaria) Angel Rangelov	30	(0)
(Bulgaria) Vasil Tinchev	9	(0)
(Bulgaria) Ivan Zafirov	26	(0)
(Bulgaria) Dinko Dimitrov	3	(0)
(Bulgaria) Angel Kalburov	18	(0)
(Bulgaria) Hristo Topalov	12	(0)

Midfielders
(Bulgaria) Plamen Markov	30	(5)
(Bulgaria) Krasimir Goranov	24	(0)
(Bulgaria) Vasil Simov	9	(0)
(Bulgaria) Dimitar Aleksiev	3	(0)
(Bulgaria) Tsvetan Yonchev	27	(4)
(Bulgaria) Metodi Tomanov	5	(0)
(Bulgaria) Ivan Metodiev	24	(5)

Forwards
(Bulgaria) Spas Dzhevizov	28	(21)
(Bulgaria) Mario Valkov	22	(6)
(Bulgaria) Tsvetan Danov	2	(0)
(Bulgaria) Nikola Hristov	26	(13)
(Bulgaria) Georgi Slavkov	9	(5)
(Bulgaria) Dimitar Dimitrov	4	(0)

Manager
(Bulgaria) Asparuh Nikodimov

== Top scorers ==
Rank	Scorer	Club	Goals
1	(Bulgaria) Spas Dzhevizov	CSKA Sofia	21
2	(Bulgaria) Andrey Zhelyazkov	Slavia Sofia	19
3	(Bulgaria) Chavdar Tsvetkov	Slavia Sofia	18
4	(Bulgaria) Ivan Petrov	Marek Dupnitsa	14
5	(Bulgaria) Nikola Hristov	CSKA Sofia	13
6	(Bulgaria) Petko Petkov	Beroe Stara Zagora	12
6	(Bulgaria) Tsonko Simeonov	Sliven	12
8	(Bulgaria) Krasimir Manolov	Trakia Plovdiv	11
8	(Bulgaria) Rafi Rafiev	Cherno More	11
8	(Bulgaria) Blagoy Krastanov	Spartak Pleven	11

== Awards ==
=== Team of the Season ===
Team of the Season (by newspaper Naroden Sport)
Goalkeeper	(Bulgaria) Hristo Hristov (Pirin)			
Defence	(Bulgaria) Ivan Ilchev (Chernomorets)	(Bulgaria) Bozhil Kolev (Cherno More)	(Bulgaria) Boko Dimitrov (Lokomotiv Sofia)	(Bulgaria) Evlogi Banchev (Minyor)
Midfield	(Bulgaria) Venelin Toshkov (Botev Vratsa)		(Bulgaria) Andrey Zhelyazkov (Slavia)	(Bulgaria) Valentin Maldzhanski (Botev Vratsa)
Attack	(Bulgaria) Georgi Iliev (Chernomorets)		(Bulgaria) Petko Petkov (Beroe)	(Bulgaria) Chavdar Tsvetkov (Slavia)
