= Ivaylo Asparuhov =

Bulgarian football player, striker

Personal information
- Full name: Ivaylo Lyubchev Asparuhov
- Date of birth: 31 March 1971 (age 55)
- Place of birth: Sofia, Bulgaria
- Height: 1.88 m (6 ft 2 in)
- Position: Striker

Youth career
- –1989: Lokomotiv Sofia

Senior career*
Years	Team	Apps	(Gls)
1989–1992	Lokomotiv Sofia		
1991–1992	→ Belasitsa Petrich (on loan)		
1992–1994	Juventude		
1994–1995	Lokomotiv G. O.		
1995–1996	Chernomorets		
1996–1997	FK Skopje		
1997–1998	Sloga Jugomagnat		
1998–1999	Primorje		
1999–2000	Ethnikos Piraeus		

Managerial career
- 2003–2004: Akademik Sofia (U15)
- 2004–2006: Levski Dolna Banya
- 2006–2007: Akademik Sofia (player-coach)
- 2008–2010: Levski Sofia (U19)
- 2010: Belasitsa Petrich
- since 2011: North West Region of Bulgaria (youth team)
- * Club domestic league appearances and goals

Ivaylo Lyubchev Asparuhov (Bulgarian: Ивайло Любчев Аспарухов) (born 31 March 1971 in Sofia) was a Bulgarian football player, striker and currently coach in the North West Regional Youth team, new project of Bulgarian Football Union.

As a coach, Ivaylo Lyubchev Asparuhov has been associated with a style of play characterised by attacking, aggressive football with his teams. He has worked with a number of professional players, including Borislav Baldzhiyski and Simeon Ivanov, during his coaching career.

== Achievements as a player ==
2nd top-scorer of Bulgarian L2 with 16 goals: 1996

vice-champion of FYR Macedonia with FK Skopje: 1997

champion of FYR Macedonia with Sloga Jugomagnat: 1998

Winner of Cup of FYR Macedonia: 1998

Top-scorer of First Macedonian League in 1998 with 24 goals

== Achievements as a coach ==
At 2008 Asparuhov appointed as a coach in Levski FC academy. He start to work with U19 team and won National Championship U19 and International tournament Youlian Manzarov. At 2011 Asparuhov appointed in new project of Bulgarian Football Union for youth players. He take head coach position in North West regional teams for U15 and U16.
