= 1974 Balkans Cup =

Tournament details
- Country: Balkans
- Teams: 6

Final positions
- Champions: (Bulgaria) Akademik Sofia
- Runners-up: (Socialist Federal Republic of Yugoslavia) FK Vardar

Tournament statistics
- Matches played: 14
- Goals scored: 38 (2.71 per match)

The 1974 Balkans Cup was an edition of the Balkans Cup, a football competition for representative clubs from the Balkan states. It was contested by 6 teams and Akademik Sofia won the trophy.

== Group Stage ==
=== Group A ===
Pos	Team	Pld	W	D	L	GF	GA	GR	Pts	Qualification
1	(Bulgaria) Akademik Sofia (A)	4	3	0	1	9	2	4.500	6	Advances to finals
2	(Romania) SC Bacău	4	2	1	1	5	3	1.667	5	
3	(Turkey) Boluspor	4	0	1	3	3	12	0.250	1	

Source: rsssf.com
Rules for classification: 1) points; 2) goal average; 3) number of goals scored
(A) Advance to a further round
6 March 1974

SC Bacău (Romania)	1–0	(Bulgaria) Akademik Sofia
Soșu 74'

Municipal, Bacău
Attendance: 10.000

20 March 1974

Akademik Sofia (Bulgaria)	6–0	(Turkey) Boluspor

Akademik, Sofia

10 April 1974

Boluspor (Turkey)	2–2	(Romania) SC Bacău
Rıdvan Ertan 42'; Alayoğlu 48'		Băluţă 52'; Dembrovschi 77'

Bolu Atatürk, Bolu

17 April 1974

Akademik Sofia (Bulgaria)	1–0	(Romania) SC Bacău

Akademik, Sofia

15 May 1974

Boluspor (Turkey)	1–2	(Bulgaria) Akademik Sofia
Aydın 88'		Radev 55', 73'

Bolu Atatürk, Bolu

29 May 1974

SC Bacău (Romania)	2–0	(Turkey) Boluspor
Pană 24'; Dembrovschi 74'

Municipal, Bacău

=== Group B ===
Pos	Team	Pld	W	D	L	GF	GA	GR	Pts	Qualification
1	(Socialist Federal Republic of Yugoslavia) FK Vardar (A)	4	3	0	1	8	2	4.000	6	Advances to finals
2	(Greece) AEL	4	1	1	2	5	8	0.625	3	
3	(Albania) Partizani Tirana	4	1	1	2	5	8	0.625	3	

Source: rsssf.com
Rules for classification: 1) points; 2) goal average; 3) number of goals scored
(A) Advance to a further round
6 March 1974

Partizani Tirana (Albania)	2–1	(Socialist Federal Republic of Yugoslavia) FK Vardar

Dinamo Stadium, Tirana

20 March 1974

FK Vardar (Socialist Federal Republic of Yugoslavia)	2–0	(Greece) AEL

Gradski, Skopje

10 April 1974

AEL (Greece)	3–1	(Albania) Partizani Tirana

Alcazar Stadium, Larissa

18 May 1974

FK Vardar (Socialist Federal Republic of Yugoslavia)	2–0	(Albania) Partizani Tirana

Gradski Arena, Skopje

May 1974

AEL (Greece)	0–3	(Socialist Federal Republic of Yugoslavia) FK Vardar

Alcazar Stadium, Larissa

29 May 1974

Partizani Tirana (Albania)	2–2	(Greece) AEL

Dinamo Stadium, Tirana

== Finals ==
Team 1	Agg.	Team 2	1st leg	2nd leg
Akademik Sofia (Bulgaria)	2–1	(Socialist Federal Republic of Yugoslavia) FK Vardar	2–1	0–0

=== First leg ===
1974

Akademik Sofia (Bulgaria)	2–1	(Socialist Federal Republic of Yugoslavia) FK Vardar

Akademik Stadium, Sofia

=== Second leg ===
1974

FK Vardar (Socialist Federal Republic of Yugoslavia)	0–0	(Bulgaria) Akademik Sofia

Gradski Arena, Skopje

Akademik Sofia won 2–1 on aggregate.
