= 1975–76 A Group =

32nd season of top-tier football league in Bulgaria

A Group
- Season: 1975–76
- Champions: CSKA Sofia (19th title)
- Relegated: Cherno More; Spartak Pleven
- European Cup: CSKA
- UEFA Cup: Akademik; Lokomotiv Plovdiv
- Matches played: 240
- Goals scored: 578 (2.41 per match)
- Top goalscorer: Petko Petkov (19 goals)

The 1975–76 A Group was the 28th season of the A Football Group, the top Bulgarian professional league for association football clubs, since its establishment in 1948.

== Overview ==
It was contested by 16 teams, and CSKA Sofia won the championship.

== League standings ==
Pos	Team	Pld	W	D	L	GF	GA	GD	Pts	Qualification or relegation
1	CSKA Sofia (C)	30	17	9	4	61	30	+31	43	Qualification for European Cup first round
2	Levski Sofia	30	16	9	5	58	33	+25	41	Qualification for Cup Winners' Cup first round
3	Akademik Sofia	30	14	9	7	35	25	+10	37	Qualification for UEFA Cup first round
4	Lokomotiv Plovdiv	30	12	9	9	43	33	+10	33	Qualification for UEFA Cup first round
5	Slavia Sofia	30	11	10	9	43	41	+2	32	
6	Botev Plovdiv	30	10	12	8	24	26	−2	32	
7	Sliven	30	13	5	12	29	30	−1	31	
8	Lokomotiv Sofia	30	9	11	10	35	33	+2	29	
9	Dunav Ruse	30	11	7	12	32	38	−6	29	
10	Beroe Stara Zagora	30	8	12	10	35	39	−4	28	
11	Spartak Varna	30	10	7	13	32	33	−1	27	
12	Pirin Blagoevgrad	30	7	13	10	24	28	−4	27	
13	Botev Vratsa	30	11	5	14	30	36	−6	27	
14	Minyor Pernik	30	8	10	12	30	46	−16	26	
15	Cherno More Varna (R)	30	7	10	13	35	44	−9	24	Relegation to 1976–77 B Group
16	Spartak Pleven (R)	30	4	6	20	32	63	−31	14	Relegation to 1976–77 B Group

Source: rsssf.com
(C) Champions; (R) Relegated

== Results ==
Home \ Away	AKD	BSZ	BPD	BVR	CHM	CSK	DUN	LEV	LPL	LSO	MIN	PIR	SLA	SLI	SPV	SPL
Akademik Sofia		0–1	0–0	2–0	3–0	1–1	1–1	0–2	3–0	1–1	1–0	1–0	4–5	1–0	3–2	2–1
Beroe Stara Zagora	0–0		1–1	2–0	1–1	1–1	0–1	2–3	1–0	1–1	5–0	1–0	3–1	0–0	1–0	3–0
Botev Plovdiv	1–0	1–1		2–0	0–0	0–3	1–0	2–2	2–2	1–0	2–1	1–0	2–0	2–0	1–2	1–0
Botev Vratsa	0–1	3–0	0–0		2–1	1–3	0–2	0–0	3–0	2–1	2–0	1–0	3–0	2–0	1–0	2–1
Cherno More	0–1	2–0	0–0	3–2		0–2	4–2	2–3	1–0	1–0	1–0	1–1	1–2	1–3	1–1	4–2
CSKA Sofia	2–0	5–1	1–1	2–3	1–1		2–0	1–4	3–1	2–2	3–1	1–0	2–1	4–1	3–1	5–0
Dunav Ruse	0–1	2–2	1–0	0–0	2–2	1–0		2–2	2–1	1–0	1–0	3–1	0–0	1–2	3–0	4–1
Levski Sofia	1–3	5–2	2–0	3–0	2–1	1–3	5–0		1–0	1–0	1–1	1–1	0–0	1–0	2–0	7–1
Lokomotiv Plovdiv	1–1	0–0	0–0	1–0	3–1	2–2	1–0	1–1		1–0	4–0	4–0	2–2	3–0	2–1	1–0
Lokomotiv Sofia	2–0	2–1	2–0	0–0	1–1	0–2	2–2	2–4	1–1		1–0	0–0	0–1	4–0	2–1	3–1
Minyor Pernik	1–1	4–3	0–0	0–0	1–0	1–0	2–0	1–1	1–1	2–2		1–0	4–1	2–0	1–1	1–1
Pirin Blagoevgrad	0–1	0–0	2–0	2–1	1–0	1–1	2–0	2–0	1–2	3–3	1–1		0–0	0–0	1–0	2–2
Slavia Sofia	1–2	2–0	0–0	4–1	3–3	3–3	1–0	1–2	2–1	1–1	0–2	0–0		2–0	1–1	4–0
Sliven	1–1	2–0	1–0	2–0	3–1	0–0	3–0	1–0	2–1	2–0	3–0	0–0	2–1		0–1	1–0
Spartak Varna	1–0	0–0	3–0	1–0	1–0	1–2	2–0	1–1	2–3	0–1	4–1	0–0	1–2	1–0		3–1
Spartak Pleven	0–0	2–2	2–3	3–1	1–1	0–1	0–1	3–0	0–4	0–1	6–1	2–3	1–2	1–0	0–0	

Source: A PFG (in Bulgarian)
Legend: Blue = home team win; Yellow = draw; Red = away team win.

== Champions ==
CSKA Sofia

Goalkeepers
(Bulgaria) Stoyan Yordanov	18	(0)
(Bulgaria) Yordan Filipov	13	(0)
(Bulgaria) Ivan Kamarashev	1	(0)

Defenders
(Bulgaria) Kiril Stankov	15	(1)
(Bulgaria) Dimitar Penev	21	(1)
(Bulgaria) Ivan Zafirov	22	(1)
(Bulgaria) Angel Rangelov	28	(1)
(Bulgaria) Bozhil Kolev	24	(8)
(Bulgaria) Stefan Velichkov	10	(0)
(Bulgaria) Tsonyo Vasilev	28	(2)

Midfielders
(Bulgaria) Borislav Sredkov	18	(2)
(Bulgaria) Plamen Markov	15	(0)
(Bulgaria) Plamen Yankov	3	(1)
(Bulgaria) Georgi Denev	25	(7)
(Bulgaria) Tsvetan Atanasov	9	(0)
(Bulgaria) Milen Goranov	20	(8)
(Bulgaria) Tsvetan Yonchev	28	(4)
(Bulgaria) Ivan Metodiev	16	(2)

Forwards
(Bulgaria) Ivan Pritargov	29	(10)
(Bulgaria) Dimitar Marashliev	15	(4)
(Bulgaria) Dimitar Dimitrov	15	(9)

Manager
(Bulgaria) Sergi Yotsov

== Top scorers ==
Rank	Scorer	Club	Goals
1	(Bulgaria) Petko Petkov	Beroe Stara Zagora	19
2	(Bulgaria) Pavel Panov	Levski Sofia	14
3	(Bulgaria) Nikola Hristov	Dunav Ruse	13
4	(Bulgaria) Yordan Yordanov	Levski Sofia	11
4	(Bulgaria) Andrey Zhelyazkov	Slavia Sofia	11
4	(Bulgaria) Georgi Yordanov	Minyor Pernik	11
7	(Bulgaria) Ivan Pritargov	CSKA Sofia	10
7	(Bulgaria) Kiril Milanov	Levski Sofia	10
9	(Bulgaria) Dimitar Dimitrov	CSKA Sofia	9
9	(Bulgaria) Chavdar Tsvetkov	Slavia Sofia	9
9	(Bulgaria) Ivan Bozhilov	Botev Vratsa	9
