= Yordan Filipov =

Bulgarian footballer

Personal information
- Date of birth: 18 June 1946
- Place of birth: Sofia, Bulgaria
- Date of death: 27 July 1996 (aged 50)
- Position: Goalkeeper

Senior career*
Years	Team	Apps	(Gls)
1963–1964	Rozova Dolina		
1964–1965	Spartak Plovdiv	21	(0)
1965–1980	CSKA Sofia	188	(0)
1980–1981	Dunav Ruse	39	(0)
1981–1983	Sliven	44	(0)
1983–1985	Rabat Ajax	22	(0)
1985–1987	CSKA Sofia	2	(0)
1988	Cherno More	23	(0)

International career
1968–1979	Bulgaria	28	(0)
- * Club domestic league appearances and goals

Yordan Filipov (Bulgarian: Йордан Филипов; 18 June 1946 - 27 July 1996) was a Bulgarian footballer who played as a goalkeeper. He was maternal grandfather of Andrey Galabinov. In his career Filipov played for Rozova Dolina, Spartak Plovdiv, CSKA Sofia, Sliven, Dunav Ruse, Rabat Ajax and Cherno More Varna, with whom he became the oldest player to appear in the Bulgarian A Group. Filipov played his last career game on 26 November 1988 at Ticha Stadium against Lokomotiv Plovdiv at 42 years, 5 months and 8 days.

Between 1965 and 1980 Filipov won nine A Group titles and four Bulgarian Cups with CSKA, playing 188 league matches.

== Honours ==
=== Club ===
CSKA Sofia

- A Group (9): 1965–66, 1968–69, 1970–71, 1971–72, 1972–73, 1974–75, 1975–76, 1979–80, 1986–87
- Bulgarian Cup (4): 1969, 1972, 1973, 1974

Rabat Ajax

- Maltese Premier League (1) : 1984–85
- Euro Cup (1) : 1984–85
