= Kiril Stankov =

Bulgarian footballer

Personal information
- Full name: Kiril Stankov Hristov
- Date of birth: 20 May 1949
- Place of birth: Sofia, Bulgaria
- Date of death: 7 May 1992 (aged 42)
- Positions: Defender; midfielder

Senior career*
Years	Team	Apps	(Gls)
1967–1977	CSKA Sofia	212	(3)

International career
1968–1976	Bulgaria	12	(0)
- * Club domestic league appearances and goals

Olympic medal record

Representing Bulgaria

Men's Football
Silver medal – second place	1968 Mexico	Team competition

Kiril Stankov Hristov (Bulgarian: Кирил Станков Христов; 20 May 1949 – 7 May 1992) was an international Bulgarian footballer who played for CSKA Sofia as a defender. During his club career, he won the national Bulgarian league six times.

== International career ==
At the age of 19, Stankov won the silver medal with the Bulgarian Olympic team at the 1968 Summer Olympics, where he featured in three games, including the final. Including these games, Stankov played twelve times for the senior national team.

== Honours ==
=== Club ===
- Bulgarian A PFG (6): 1968–69, 1970–71, 1971–72, 1972–73, 1974–75, 1975–76
- Bulgarian Cup (4): 1969, 1972, 1973, 1974

=== Olympic ===
- Silver medal (1): 1968
