= Kalambay Otepa =

Congolese footballer (1948–2024)

Personal information
- Full name: Paul-Mohamed Kalambay Otepa
- Date of birth: 12 November 1948
- Place of birth: Belgian Congo
- Date of death: 12 November 2024 (aged 76)
- Place of death: Kinshasa, DR Congo
- Position: Goalkeeper

Senior career*
Years	Team	Apps	(Gls)
- TP Mazembe

International career
- Zaire
- * Club domestic league appearances and goals

Paul-Mohamed Kalambay Otepa (12 November 1948 – 12 November 2024) was a Congolese footballer who played as a goalkeeper. He was a reserve for the Zaire national team at the 1974 FIFA World Cup. At club level, he played for TP Mazembe where he won the African Cup of Champions Clubs twice, in 1967 and 1968. Otepa died in Kinshasa on 12 November 2024, his 76th birthday.
