= Mwape Mialo =

Congolese footballer

Mwapé Mialo
Personal information
- Full name: Mialo Mwapé Mialo
- Date of birth: 30 December 1951 (age 74)
- Place of birth: Belgian Congo
- Position: Defender

Senior career*
Years	Team	Apps	(Gls)
- Nyiki Lubumbashi

International career
1974-1976	Zaire	2	(0)
- * Club domestic league appearances and goals

Mialo Mwapé Mialo (born 30 December 1951) is a Congolese football defender who played for Zaire in the 1974 FIFA World Cup. He also played for Nyiki Lubumbashi.
