= Stadion Akademik =

Football stadium in Sofia, Bulgaria

Akademik Stadium
- Interactive map of Akademik Stadium
- Location: Sofia, Bulgaria
- Coordinates: 42°41′7″N 23°22′7″E
- Capacity: 10,000

Tenant
- Akademik Sofia

Akademik Stadium is a football stadium located in Sofia, Bulgaria with a capacity of 8,000 sitting and 2,000 standing for sports and expandable to 22,000 for concerts. The stadium complex consists of 1 grass field, 2 additional fields, 4 changing rooms and 1 cafe-bar, as well as halls for Tae Bo, boxing, judo, a dancesport hall and a gym.

== Concerts ==
- 8 September 1992: Ian Gillan Band
- 28 August 1999: The Prodigy
- 16 July 2000: Motörhead
- 29 July 2000: Alice Cooper - "Live from the Brutal Planet"
- 3 July 2002: Halford / Slayer - "Arena Muzika"
- 14 June 2003: Whitesnake - "Arena Muzika"
- 18 June 2004: Judas Priest / Queensrÿche - "Arena Muzika"
- 21 June 2004: Peter Gabriel - "Arena Muzika"
- 1 June 2007: INXS
- 4 April 2008: Whitesnake / Def Leppard
- 16 May 2008: Kiss
- 29 June 2009: Saga / Queensrÿche / Limp Bizkit - "Rock the Balkans"
- 25 October 2010: Scorpions - "Get Your Sting and Blackout World Tour"
- 6 July 2014 30 Seconds to Mars / The Offspring
