= Göran Hagberg =

Swedish footballer (1947–2024)

Personal information
- Full name: Ulf Göran Hagberg
- Date of birth: 8 November 1947
- Place of birth: Bjuv, Sweden
- Date of death: 2 April 2024 (aged 76)
- Place of death: Alvesta Municipality, Sweden
- Height: 1.83 m (6 ft 0 in)
- Position: Goalkeeper

Senior career*
Years	Team	Apps	(Gls)
1966–1968	Landskrona BoIS		
1969–1979	Östers IF	242	(0)
1982	AIK	10	(0)
1983	Ljungby IF		

International career
1973–1979	Sweden	15	(0)
- * Club domestic league appearances and goals

Ulf Göran Hagberg (8 November 1947 – 2 April 2024) was a Swedish footballer who played as a goalkeeper.

== Club career ==
During his club career Hagberg played for Landskrona BoIS, Östers IF, Alvesta GIF, AIK and Ljungby IF between 1966 and 1983.

== International career ==
Hagberg played 15 international games for Sweden, and participated in the 1974 and 1978 FIFA World Cups in West Germany and Argentina respectively.

== Death ==
Hagberg died on 2 April 2024, at the age of 76.

== Honours ==
Östers IF

- Allsvenskan: 1978
- Svenska Cupen: 1976–77
