= Mario González (footballer, born 1950) =

Uruguayan footballer (1950–2019)

Personal information
- Full name: Mario Wálter González
- Date of birth: 27 May 1950 (age 76)
- Place of birth: Uruguay
- Date of death: 2 November 2019

International career
Years	Team	Apps	(Gls)
- Uruguay

Mario Wálter González (27 May 1950 – 2 November 2019) was a professional footballer with Uruguayan club C.A. Peñarol and was part of the Uruguayan Squad at the World Cup in Germany in 1974. He played as a defender.
