= Jean-Herbert Austin =

Haitian footballer (born 1950)

Personal information
- Full name: Jean-Herbert Austin
- Date of birth: 23 February 1950 (age 76)
- Place of birth: Haiti

International career
| Years | Team | Apps | (Gls) |
- Haiti

Jean-Herbert Austin (born 23 February 1950) is a Haitian retired footballer. Austin attended college at New York University, where he was twice named to the All-American men's soccer team and three times named to the New York State All-Star Team. In 1998, he was inducted to the NYU Sports Hall of Fame. By 1974 he was a member of Violette AC, and was in the Haiti squad for the 1974 FIFA World Cup, but did not play in the competition.
