= Pablo Forlán =

Uruguayan footballer (born 1945)

Personal information
- Full name: Pablo Justo Forlán Lamarque
- Date of birth: 14 July 1945 (age 81)
- Place of birth: Soriano, Uruguay
- Position: Defender

Senior career*
Years	Team	Apps	(Gls)
1963–1970	Peñarol		
1970–1976	São Paulo	73	(8)
1976	Peñarol		
1976	Cruzeiro		
1978	Nacional		
1979–1984	Defensor		

International career
1966–1976	Uruguay	17	(0)
- * Club domestic league appearances and goals

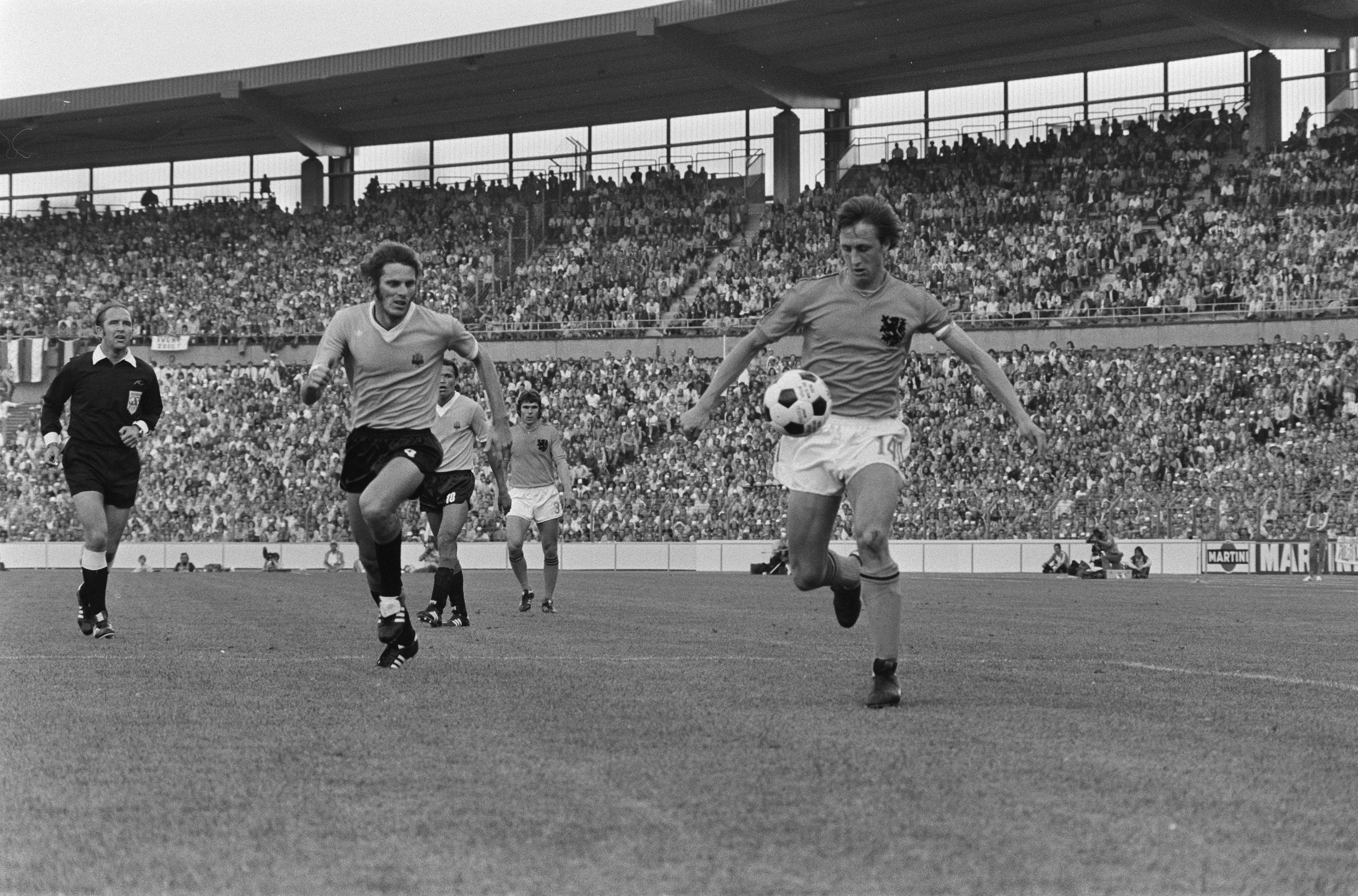

Pablo Justo Forlán Lamarque (born 14 July 1945) is a Uruguayan retired footballer, the father of Diego Forlán, and son-in-law of Juan Carlos Corazzo.

== Career ==
As a professional footballer Pablo Forlán played for Peñarol (1963–1970), São Paulo FC (1970–1976), Cruzeiro EC (1977), Nacional de Montevideo (1978) and Defensor Sporting (1979–1984). During his career he helped win the Uruguayan league (1964, 1965, 1967, 1968, 1978, 1980, 1982), the Copa Libertadores (1966), the Intercontinental Cup (1966) and the São Paulo state championship (1970, 1971, 1975).

Pablo Forlán was also a Uruguayan international, who was part of the squads for the 1966 and 1974 FIFA World Cups.

== Titles ==
- Intercontinental Champions' Supercup 1969
