= Walter Mantegazza =

Uruguayan footballer (1952-2006)

Personal information
- Full name: Wálter Daniel Mantegazza González
- Date of birth: June 17, 1952
- Place of birth: Uruguay
- Date of death: June 20, 2006 (aged 54)

International career
Years	Team	Apps	(Gls)
- Uruguay

Wálter Daniel Mantegazza González (17 June 1952 – 20 June 2006) was a professional footballer who was part of the Uruguayan Squad at the World Cup in Germany in 1974. He played as a midfielder.

== Career ==
Born in Montevideo, Mantegazza began playing football with local club Nacional. He also played for Mexican sides Club León and Tigres de la UANL, helping Tigres win their first Mexican Primera División title in 1977–78.
