= Baudilio Jáuregui =

Uruguayan footballer (born 1945)

Personal information
- Full name: Baudilio Jáuregui Pelayo
- Date of birth: July 9, 1945 (age 81)
- Place of birth: Montevideo, Uruguay
- Height: 1.72 m (5 ft 8 in)

Senior career*
Years	Team	Apps	(Gls)
1968–1971	River Plate de Montevideo		
1971–1974	River Plate		
1975–1977	Defensor Sporting		
1977–1980	Cobreloa		

International career
1972–1974	Uruguay	9	(0)

Managerial career
- 1982: Defensor Sporting
- * Club domestic league appearances and goals

Baudilio Jáuregui Pelayo (born July 9, 1945) is a Uruguayan former footballer who played as a centre-back. He played for clubs of Uruguay, Argentina and Chile, and the Uruguay national team in the 1974 FIFA World Cup in West Germany.

== Honours ==
Defensor Sporting

- Uruguayan Primera División: 1976

Cobreloa

- Chilean Primera División: 1980
