= Jan Olsson (footballer, born 1942) =

Swedish footballer

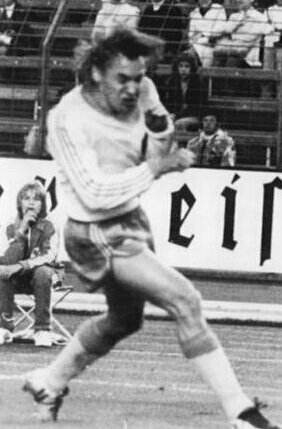
- Jan Olsson during the 1974 FIFA World Cup

Personal information
- Full name: Jan Olof Olsson
- Date of birth: 30 March 1942 (age 84)
- Place of birth: Halmstad, Sweden
- Position: Defender

Senior career*
Years	Team	Apps	(Gls)
1961–1965	Halmstads BK	156	(12)
1965–1978	Åtvidabergs FF	230	(1)
Total		386	(13)

International career
1973–1974	Sweden	17	(0)
- * Club domestic league appearances and goals

Jan Olof "Janne" Olsson (born 30 March 1942) is a Swedish former footballer who played mostly as a defender. He represented Halmstads BK and Åtvidabergs FF during a club career that spanned between 1961 and 1978. A full international between 1973 and 1974, he won 17 caps for the Sweden national team and represented his country at the 1974 FIFA World Cup.

== Club career ==
Olsson played for Åtvidabergs FF in Allsvenskan during the 1960s and 1970s, and he became Swedish champion with the club in 1972 and 1973.

== International career ==
Olsson played 17 times for the Sweden national team and was a member of the squad in the 1974 FIFA World Cup. He is largely remembered for being victim of the very first Cruyff turn in Sweden's match against Holland at the 1974 World Cup in West Germany.

== Honours ==
Åtvidabergs FF

- Allsvenskan: 1972, 1973
