= Kent Karlsson =

Swedish football coach and former player (born 1945)

Personal information
- Date of birth: 25 November 1945 (age 80)
- Place of birth: Arboga, Sweden
- Height: 1.82 m (6 ft 0 in)
- Position: Defender

Senior career*
Years	Team	Apps	(Gls)
1963–1966	IFK Eskilstuna		
1967–1976	Åtvidabergs FF		
1976–1980	IFK Eskilstuna		

International career
1973–1977	Sweden	38	(0)

Managerial career
- 1981–1982: IK Brage
- 1983–1985: Bryne
- 1985–1989: IFK Norrköping
- 1990: Kongsvinger IL
- 1991–1992: Lyngby BK
- 1993: Örebro SK
- 1995: IFK Norrköping
- 1996–1997: IK Sleipner
- 1997–1998: FC Copenhagen
- 2000–2001: IK Sleipner
- 2001: FC Copenhagen
- 2001: Assyriska FF
- 2002–2003: Västerås SK Fotboll
- 2004–2006: Åtvidabergs FF
- 2007–2009: Smedby AIS
- 2010: IK Sleipner
- * Club domestic league appearances and goals

Kent Karlsson (born 25 November 1945) is a Swedish football coach and former player. He was capped 38 times for the national team and played at the 1974 FIFA World Cup. As a manager, he has managed Swedish, Danish and Norwegian clubs such as IFK Norrköping, Bryne IL, Lyngby BK and FC Copenhagen.
