= Hristo Mladenov =

Bulgarian football manager (1928–1996)

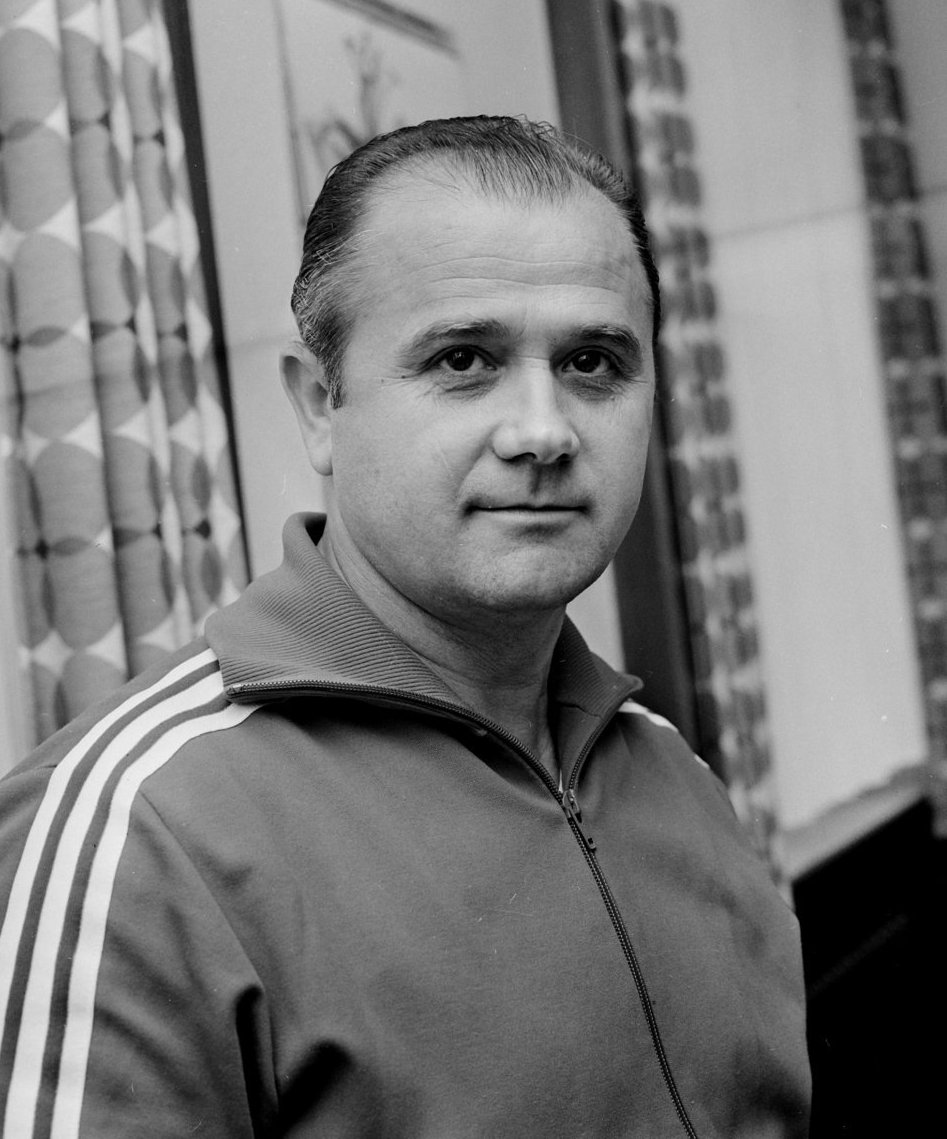
- Mladenov in 1974

Personal information
- Full name: Hristo Stefanov Mladenov
- Date of birth: 7 January 1928
- Place of birth: Bulgaria
- Date of death: 24 August 1996 (aged 68)
- Place of death: Bulgaria

Senior career*
Years	Team	Apps	(Gls)
- Montana
- Botev Vratsa

Managerial career
- 1954–1958: Spartak Pleven
- 1960–1961: Spartak Sofia
- 1964: Levski Sofia
- 1968–1972: Beroe Stara Zagora
- 1972–1974: Bulgaria
- 1975: Beroe Stara Zagora
- 1976–1977: Bulgaria
- 1978–1980: Slavia Sofia
- 1980–1981: Levski Sofia
- 1982–1984: Farense
- 1986–1987: Bulgaria
- 1988–1989: Slavia Sofia
- 1989: Belenenses
- * Club domestic league appearances and goals

Hristo Stefanov Mladenov (Bulgarian: Хpиcтo Cтeфaнoв Mлaдeнoв) (7 January 1928 – 24 August 1996) was a Bulgarian football player and manager. He was the manager of the Bulgaria national team during the 1974 FIFA World Cup.

He coached Bulgaria three times, and narrowly failed to get them to the finals of Euro 88. He also managed Spartak Pleven, Spartak Sofia, Levski Sofia, Beroe Stara Zagora, Slavia Sofia, Farense and Belenenses.
