= Tsonyo Vasilev =

Bulgarian footballer

Personal information
- Full name: Tsonyo Dimitrov Vasilev
- Date of birth: 7 January 1952
- Place of birth: Targovishte, Bulgaria
- Date of death: 2 June 2015 (aged 63)
- Place of death: Shumen, Bulgaria
- Position: Left back

Senior career*
Years	Team	Apps	(Gls)
1970–1973	Volov Shumen	29	(1)
1973–1981	CSKA Sofia	199	(6)
1981–1984	Volov Shumen		
1984	Ethnikos Achna		
1985	Volov Shumen		

International career
1973–1981	Bulgaria	42	(2)

Managerial career
- 1997: Cherno More
- * Club domestic league appearances and goals

Tsonyo Dimitrov Vasilev (Bulgarian: Цoньo Димитpoв Вacилeв; 7 January 1952 – 2 June 2015) was a Bulgarian football defender who played for Bulgaria in the 1974 FIFA World Cup.

Vasilev made 199 appearances at left back for CSKA Sofia and also represented Volov Shumen.

== Honours ==
=== Club ===
CSKA Sofia

- A Group (4): 1974–75, 1975–76, 1979–80, 1980–81
- Bulgarian Cup: 1973–74
