= Romeo Corbo =

Uruguayan footballer (born 1952)

Personal information
- Full name: Ruben Romeo Corbo Burmia
- Date of birth: 20 January 1952 (age 74)
- Place of birth: Uruguay
- Position: Striker

Senior career*
Years	Team	Apps	(Gls)
1971–1974	Peñarol	89	(21)
1974–1980	Monterrey	149	(53)
1980–1982	Tampico		
1982–1984	Tampico Madero		

International career
1971–1974	Uruguay	22	(0)
- * Club domestic league appearances and goals

Ruben Romeo Corbo Burmia (born 20 January 1952) is a retired Uruguayan football striker who played for several clubs in Latin America, including C.A. Peñarol and Club de Futbol Monterrey.

Corbo received 22 caps for the Uruguay national football team, and played at the 1974 FIFA World Cup. He's brother of Walter Corbo, second goalkeeper of Uruguay in Mexico 1970.

== Career ==
Known as el Pato (because of his characteristic walk), Corbo played professional football in Mexico after playing for Uruguay at the 1974 World Cup. After a successful six-season spell at Monterrey where he scored 70 official goals for the club, Corbo joined Tampico F.C. for the 1980–81 Primera División season. He was an immediate success with Tampico, where he reunited with former Monterrey teammates Basilio Bacho Salazar, Jorge Garibaldi and Francisco Bertocchi. After Tampico was dissolved following the 1981–82 Primera División season, Corbo moved to Tampico-Madero for two more seasons before retiring.
