= Ivan Pritargov =

Bulgarian footballer

Personal information
- Full name: Ivan Nikolov Pritargov
- Date of birth: 15 September 1952
- Place of birth: Burgas, Bulgaria
- Date of death: 26 January 2017 (aged 64)
- Place of death: Burgas, Bulgaria
- Position: Forward

Senior career*
Years	Team	Apps	(Gls)
1969–1974	Chernomorets Burgas	80	(22)
1974–1975	Trakia Plovdiv	27	(20)
1975–1977	CSKA Sofia	48	(12)
1977–1983	Chernomorets Burgas	174	(54)

International career
	Bulgaria	7	(2)
- * Club domestic league appearances and goals

Ivan Nikolov Pritargov (Bulgarian: Иван Притъргов; 15 September 1952 – 25 January 2017) was a Bulgarian footballer. He played as a striker in the top level of Bulgarian league football for Chernomorets Burgas, Trakia Plovdiv and CSKA Sofia. Pritargov scored 108 goals in the A Group during his career.

Pritgarov died in January 2017 after suffering a stroke.

== Legacy ==
In November 2023, Chernomorets 1919 Burgas announced they are starting the reconstruction of Cherveno Zname Stadium in Dolno Ezerovo neighborhood and renaming the stadium after Pritargov.
