= Denís Milar =

Uruguayan footballer (born 1952)

Denis Milar
Personal information
- Full name: Denís Alfredo Milar Otero
- Date of birth: June 20, 1952 (age 74)
- Place of birth: Montevideo, Uruguay
- Position: Forward

Senior career*
Years	Team	Apps	(Gls)
1972–1975	Liverpool		
1975–1978	Granada	40	(4)
1978–1981	Nacional		

International career
1973–1979	Uruguay	19	(4)
- * Club domestic league appearances and goals

Denís Alfredo Milar Otero (born August 20, 1952) is a former Uruguayan football forward, who played for the Uruguay national team between 1973 and 1979, gaining 19 caps and scoring 4 goals. He was part of the Uruguay squad for the 1974 World Cup.

At club level, Milar played for Liverpool, Granada and Nacional.
