= Alberto Cardaccio =

Uruguayan footballer (1949-2015)

Personal information
- Full name: Alberto Victor Cardaccio Traversa
- Date of birth: 26 August 1949
- Place of birth: Uruguay
- Date of death: 28 January 2015 (aged 65)
- Position: Midfielder

Senior career*
Years	Team	Apps	(Gls)
1970–1974	Danubio		
1974–1975	Racing	30	(0)
1975–1977	Unión de Curtidores	66	(12)
1977–1978	Atlas	26	(7)
1978–1979	Puebla	30	(2)
1979–1982	Monterrey	92	(6)

International career
1972–1974	Uruguay	19	(0)
- * Club domestic league appearances and goals

Alberto Víctor Cardaccio Traversa (26 August 1949 – 28 January 2015) was a Uruguayan football midfielder, who played for the Uruguay national team between 1972 and 1974, gaining 19 caps. He was part of the Uruguay squad for the 1974 World Cup, where he made one substitute appearance in the 1–1 draw against Bulgaria, which was his last international game.

At club level, Cardaccio played in Uruguay, Argentina and Mexico for Danubio, Racing, Unión de Curtidores, Atlas, Puebla and Monterrey.
