= Mladen Vasilev =

Bulgarian footballer and coach

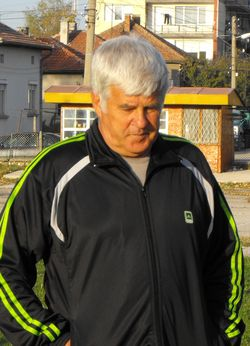
- Mladen Vasilev in present days.

Personal information
- Full name: Mladen Aleksandrov Vasilev
- Date of birth: 29 July 1947 (age 79)
- Place of birth: Slivnitsa, Bulgaria
- Positions: Winger; forward

Senior career*
Years	Team	Apps	(Gls)
1965–1968	Slivnishki Geroy	?	(?)
1968	Slavia Sofia	7	(2)
1969–1977	Akademik Sofia	209	(68)
1977–1978	Slivnishki Geroy	?	(?)

International career
1971–1975	Bulgaria	27	(7)
- * Club domestic league appearances and goals

Mladen "Maho" Aleksandrov Vasilev (Bulgarian: Младен Aлeкcaндpoв Василев; born 29 July 1947, in Slivnitsa) is a former Bulgarian football player, and later coach.

== Career ==
Born in Slivnitsa, Vasilev started his career with local side Slivnishki Geroy. Later he played for PFC Slavia Sofia (1968–1969), and Akademik Sofia (1969–1977, 209 times and 68 goals).

He played for Bulgaria national football team, including the 1974 FIFA World Cup in West Germany.
