= Jan Jongbloed =

Dutch footballer (1940–2023)

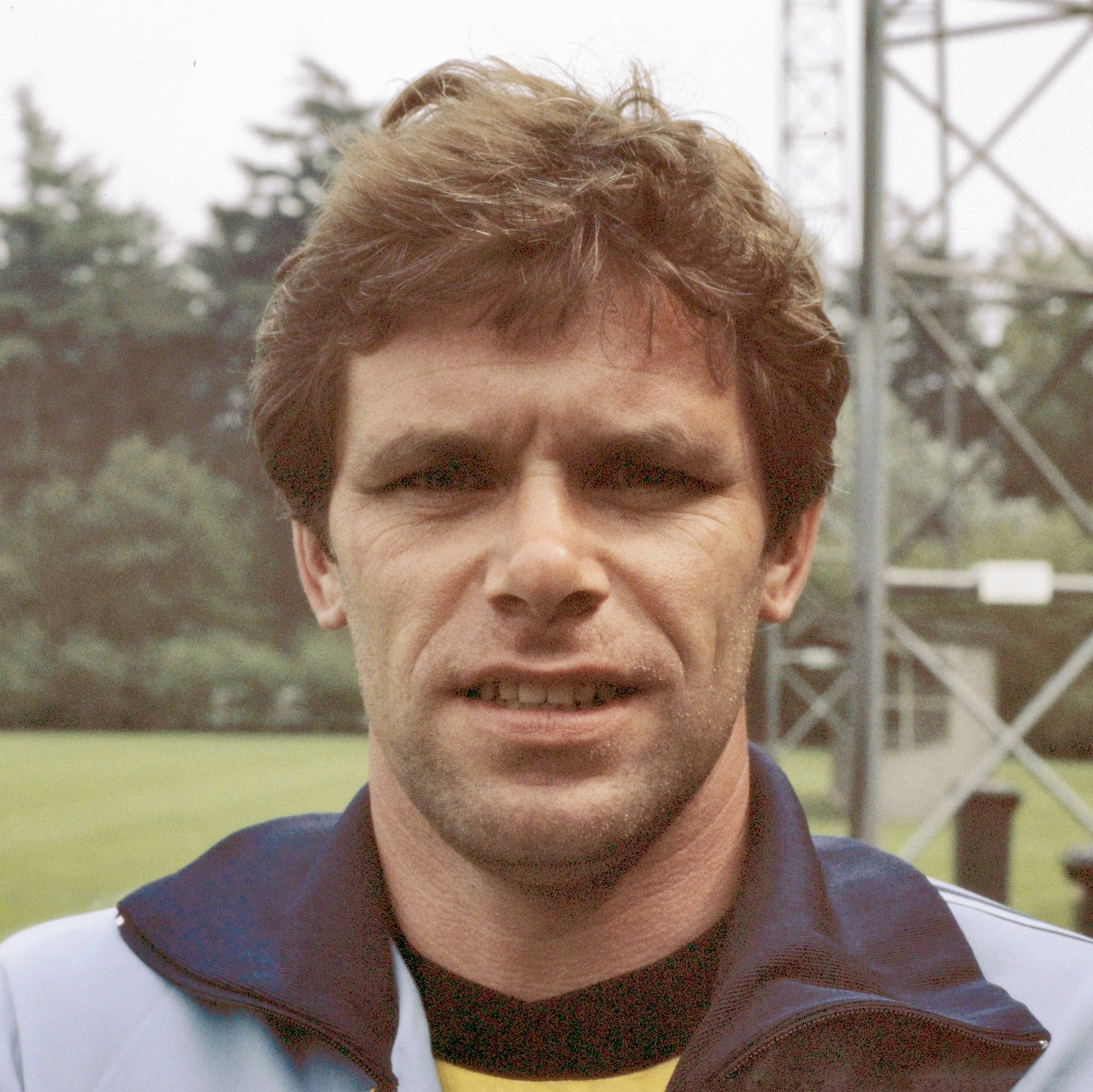
- Jongbloed in 1978

Personal information
- Date of birth: 25 November 1940
- Place of birth: Amsterdam, German-occupied Netherlands
- Date of death: 30 August 2023 (aged 82)
- Height: 1.79 m (5 ft 10 in)
- Position: Goalkeeper

Youth career
- DWS

Senior career*
Years	Team	Apps	(Gls)
1959–1972	DWS	342	(0)
1972–1977	FC Amsterdam	161	(0)
1977–1981	Roda JC	133	(0)
1982–1986	Go Ahead Eagles	81	(0)
Total		717	(0)

International career
1962–1978	Netherlands	24	(0)

Managerial career
- 1981–1982: HFC Haarlem (assistant)
- 1986–2000: Vitesse (assistant)
- 1999: Vitesse (ad interim)
- 2000–2010: Vitesse (youth)
Medal record
Men's football
Representing Netherlands
FIFA World Cup
Runner-up	1974 West Germany
Runner-up	1978 Argentina
European Championship
Third place	1976 Yugoslavia
- * Club domestic league appearances and goals

Jan Jongbloed (Dutch pronunciation: [jɑˈɲɔŋblut]) (25 November 1940 – 30 August 2023) was a Dutch professional footballer who played as a goalkeeper. He played for the Netherlands national team, having represented the country at the 1974 and 1978 FIFA World Cups, where the Oranje finished as runners-up in both tournaments.

== Club career ==
Born in Amsterdam, Jongbloed played for DWS (in 1972 rebranded as FC Amsterdam), Roda JC and Go Ahead Eagles. He played a total number of 717 league matches (of which 686 in the Eredivisie), and made the second-highest number of appearances in the history of the Eredivisie, behind only goalkeeper Pim Doesburg with 687 matches.

Jongbloed retired in 1986, at the age of 45, due to a heart attack he had suffered during an official match between Go Ahead Eagles and HFC Haarlem. After his retirement from playing, he worked as a football coach.

== International career ==
Jongbloed made 24 appearances for the Netherlands senior national team, winning his first cap in 1962 and the last in the 1978 FIFA World Cup final.

Jongbloed represented the Netherlands at the 1974 and 1978 FIFA World Cups and was included in the squad for UEFA Euro 1976. He still holds the record of 683 minutes without conceding a goal in the Dutch team, between 1975 and 1978.

== Style of play ==
As a youth player, he played as a winger. After becoming a goalkeeper, he became one of the early pioneers of the sweeper-keeper role, a style that suited the principles of totaalvoetbal because of his ability with the ball at his feet. His approach anticipated the modern role later associated with goalkeepers such as Manuel Neuer and Alisson Becker, who became known for their involvement in build-up play and tactical innovation.

== Personal life and death ==
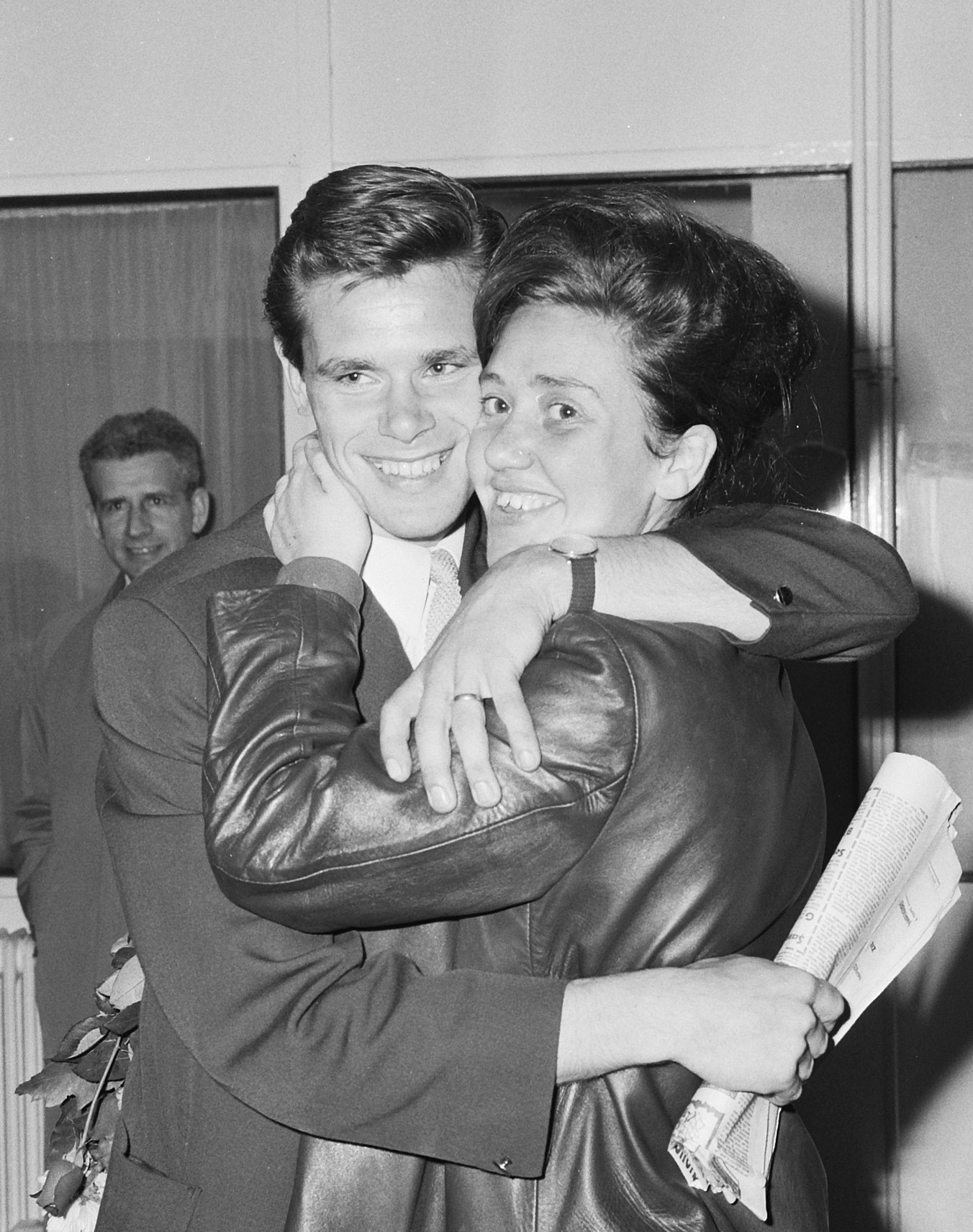
Jongbloed with his wife in 1964

Jongbloed was married twice and twice divorced; he had a daughter, Nicole, and a son, Erik. The latter also went on to play football as a goalkeeper for DWS; however, during a match on 23 September 1984, he was fatally struck by lightning, aged 21.

Jongbloed died on 30 August 2023, at the age of 82.

== Career statistics ==
=== International ===
Appearances and goals by national team and year
National team	Year	Apps	Goals
Netherlands	1962	1	0
Netherlands	1963	0	0
Netherlands	1964	0	0
Netherlands	1965	0	0
Netherlands	1966	0	0
Netherlands	1967	0	0
Netherlands	1968	0	0
Netherlands	1969	0	0
Netherlands	1970	0	0
Netherlands	1971	0	0
Netherlands	1972	0	0
Netherlands	1973	0	0
Netherlands	1974	12	0
Netherlands	1975	1	0
Netherlands	1976	0	0
Netherlands	1977	3	0
Netherlands	1978	7	0
Total		24	0

== Honours ==
DWS

- Eerste Divisie: 1962–63
- Eredivisie: 1963–64

Netherlands

- FIFA World Cup runner-up: 1974, 1978
- UEFA European Championship third place: 1976
- Tournoi de Paris: 1978

Sporting positions
Preceded by Herbert Neumann	Vitesse Arnhem Manager (a.i.) alongside Edward Sturing; 30 October 1999 – 31 December 1999	Succeeded by Ronald Koeman
