= Stefko Velichkov =

Bulgarian footballer (born 1949)

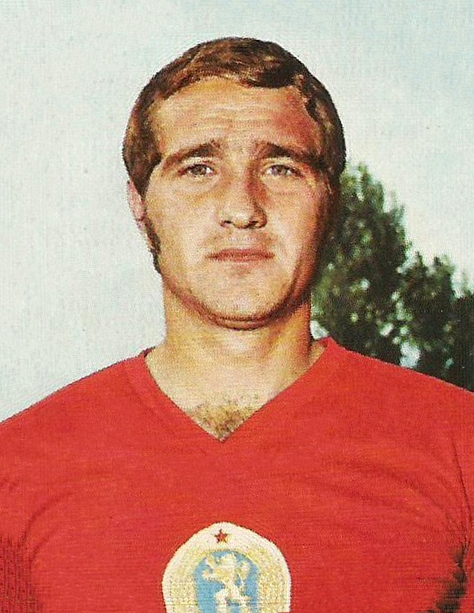

Personal information
- Full name: Stefko Konstantinov Velichkov
- Date of birth: 15 August 1949 (age 77)
- Place of birth: Pleven, Bulgaria
- Position: Left back

Youth career
- 1961–1966: Spartak Pleven

Senior career*
Years	Team	Apps	(Gls)
1966–1969	Spartak Pleven	27	(0)
1969–1970	Akademik Svishtov		
1970–1974	Etar Veliko Tarnovo	136	(0)
1974–1976	CSKA Sofia	32	(1)
1976–1980	Spartak Pleven	53	(0)

International career
1971–1974	Bulgaria	26	(1)

Managerial career
- 1980–1985: Spartak Pleven (assistant)
- 1985–1986: Spartak Pleven
- 1986–1988: Arda Kardzhali
- 1988–1990: Spartak Pleven
- 1990–1991: Svetkavitsa
- 1991–1992: Arda Kardzhali
- 1992–1993: Spartak Pleven
- * Club domestic league appearances and goals

Stefko Konstantinov Velichkov (Bulgarian: Cтeфко Кoнстaнтинoв Вeличкoв; born 15 August 1949) is a former Bulgarian football defender who played for Bulgaria at the 1974 FIFA World Cup. He also played for Spartak Pleven, Akademik Svishtov, Etar Veliko Tarnovo and CSKA Sofia.

== Honours ==
=== Club ===
CSKA Sofia

- Bulgarian A Group (2): 1974–75, 1975–76
