= Dimitar Dimitrov (footballer, born 1949) =

Bulgarian footballer

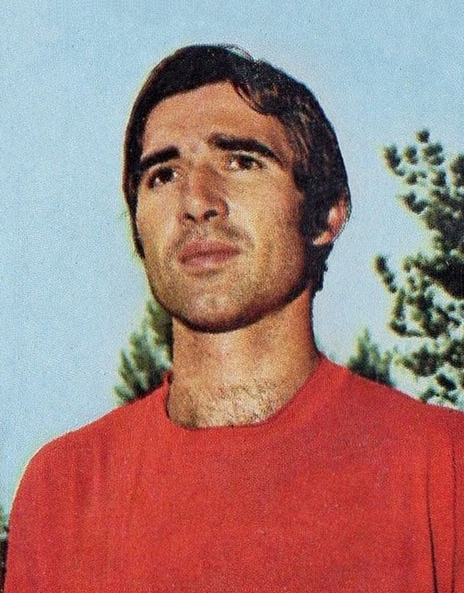
- Dimitrov c. 1974

Personal information
- Full name: Dimitar Ivanov Dimitrov
- Date of birth: 20 November 1949 (age 76)
- Place of birth: Simeonovgrad, Bulgaria
- Height: 1.77 m (5 ft 10 in)
- Positions: Midfielder; forward

Senior career*
Years	Team	Apps	(Gls)
1964–1966	FC Simeonovgrad		
1966–1967	Lokomotiv Stara Zagora		
1968–1969	Gorubso Madan		
1969–1975	Beroe Stara Zagora	165	(74)
1975–1979	CSKA Sofia	77	(16)

International career
1972–1976	Bulgaria	9	(0)
- * Club domestic league appearances and goals

Dimitar Ivanov Dimitrov (Bulgarian: Димитър Иванов Димитров; born 20 November 1949) is a former Bulgarian footballer who played as a midfielder.

In 1969, Dimitrov joined Beroe Stara Zagora. In 1975, he signed with CSKA Sofia.

== Honours ==
=== Club ===
CSKA Sofia

- Bulgarian A Group: 1975–76
