= Roland Grip =

Swedish footballer (1941–2024)

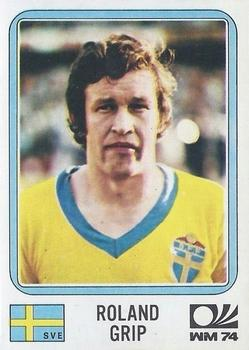
- Roland Grip with Team Sweden at the 1974 FIFA World Cup in West Germany

Personal information
- Full name: Bruno Roland Grip
- Date of birth: 1 January 1941
- Place of birth: Föllinge, Sweden
- Date of death: 9 February 2024 (aged 83)
- Place of death: Valsätra, Uppsala, Sweden
- Height: 1.75 m (5 ft 9 in)
- Position: Defender

Youth career
- 1955–1961: Bräcke SK

Senior career*
Years	Team	Apps	(Gls)
1962–1963	IFK Östersund		
1964–1970	AIK		
1971–1975	IK Sirius		
1976	SK Iron		

International career
1968–1974	Sweden	55	(1)

Managerial career
- 1980–1982: SK Iron
- * Club domestic league appearances and goals

Bruno Roland Grip (1 January 1941 – 9 February 2024) was a Swedish footballer and manager. A defender, he played for AIK making his debut in Allsvenskan in 1964, and remained at the club until 1971 when he moved to IK Sirius. He played there until his retirement in 1975. He was capped 55 times for the Sweden national team, playing in the 1970 FIFA World Cup and the 1974 FIFA World Cup. Grip died on 9 February 2024, at the age of 83.
