= PFC Akademik Sofia =

Akademik
- Full name: Професионален футболен клуб Академик София (Professional football club Akademik Sofia)
- Nickname: Студентите (The Students)
- Founded: 1947; 79 years ago
- Ground: Akademik Stadium, Sofia
- Capacity: 10,000
- Manager: Kostadin Angelov
- League: B RFG Sofia Capital South
Home colours	Away colours

Akademik Sofia (Bulgarian: Академик) is a Bulgarian football club from Sofia, which competes in the B RFG Sofa Capital South, the fifth division of the Bulgarian football league system.The team's stadium is located in the Slatina municipality of Sofia and its capacity is 10,000.

Akademik was founded in 1947 by students from the Sofia University and debuted in A PFG in 1949. The team would quickly establish itself as a top flight team in Bulgarian football in the next decades. Akademik became one of the top Bulgarian teams in the 1950s and 1970s, performing strongly in the domestic and European competitions alike, having been crowned Balkans Cup champion in 1974, among other achievements. Akademik's last appearance in the Bulgarian First League came in 2010-11, after which the club experienced financial problems and folded after the 2011–12 season. In August 2026 the team was restored and started from fifth league.

== History ==
Akademik was founded in the 1947, by Sofia University (the oldest higher education institution in Bulgaria, founded on 1 October 1888) students as a football club. Two years later, Akademik were promoted for the first time to the Bulgarian A Group. The 1950 season in the domestic league was very successful for the team, which finished 3rd in the top division. In the next campaign, Akademik finished fourth and reached the final of Bulgarian Cup, losing 0–1 to CSKA Sofia. In 1952 the club's form dropped, however, and they were relegated to B PFG finishing second to last, before Spartak Varna. Akademik would wait 12 years for another taste of top-level football, when in 1964 the club managed to promote to the A Group again. The 1964–65 season was largely unsuccessful, with the students finishing last, suffering an immediate return to the B Group.

The third promotion to A Group in 1969 marked the beginning of Akademik's golden age. From 1969 to 1979, Akademik spent their longest ever period in the top division. In 1974, Akademik won its first international trophy, beating Vardar Skopje 2–0 on aggregate in the final of Balkans Cup. In the 1975–76 season the team finished 3rd in the domestic league and qualified for the first time for the UEFA Cup. At the European level, Akademik defeated Czechoslovak side SK Slavia Prague in the first round before making a memorable appearance in the second round against Italian giants A.C. Milan, winning 4–3 at home on 20 October 1976. However, Milan won the second leg 2–0 at the San Siro stadium, eliminating Akademik. During this successful period in the club's history, two players from Akademik were selected to play for the Bulgarian national squad at a FIFA World Cup: Ivan Dimitrov for 1970 and Mladen Vasilev in 1974.

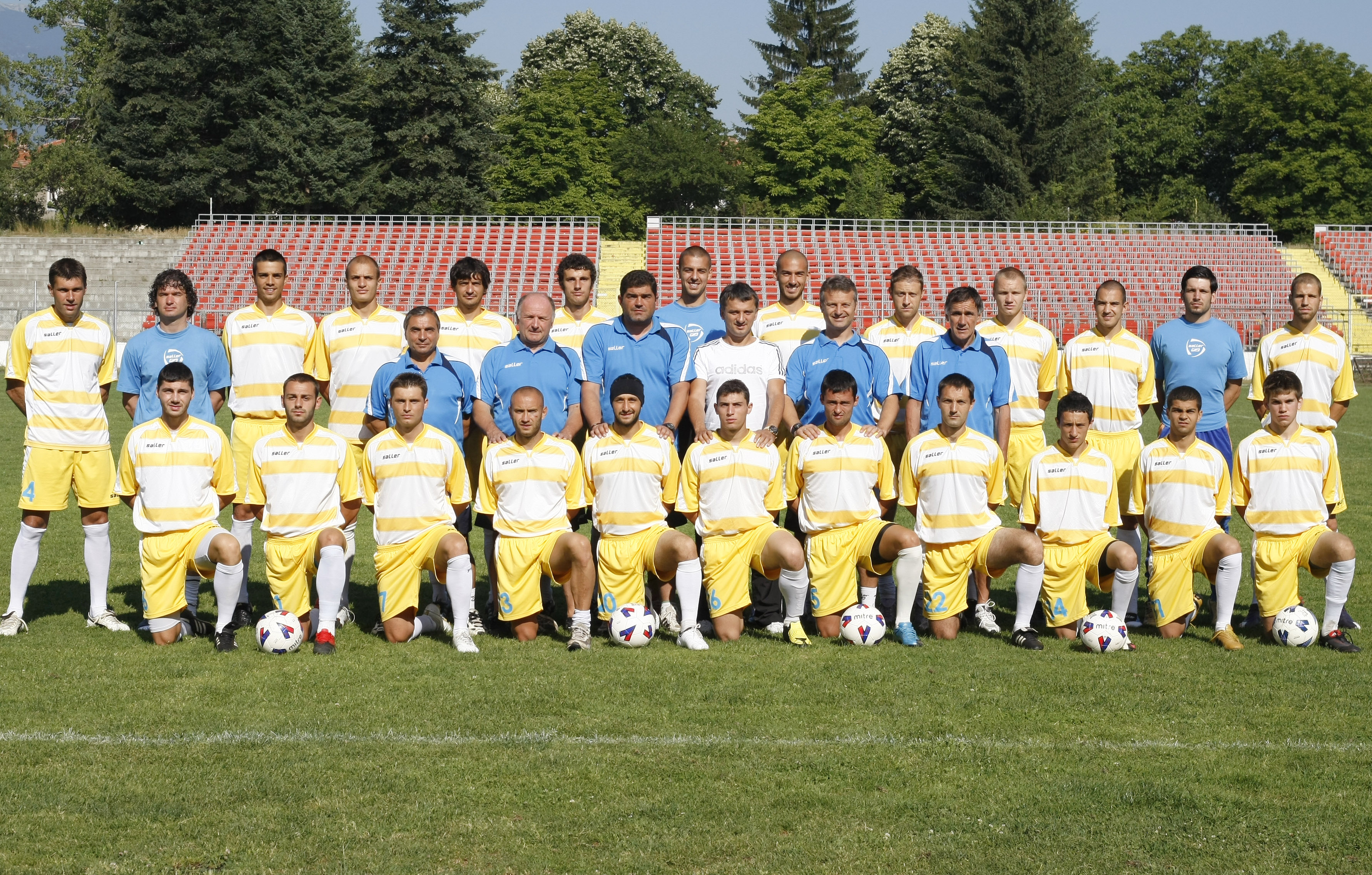
2009–10 team, which won promotion to A Group.

The glorious period for the Students ended when the club was relegated at the end of the 1978–79 season. Akademik won just six games in the campaign and this put them in last place. In the next season, the team won promotion back to the top division, scoring 100 goals in the B Group campaign. In 1981, the Students qualified for second time for the UEFA Cup, where they lost 1–3 on aggregate in the first round against 1. FC Kaiserslautern. In the same 1981–82 season, Akademik did not perform well in the league and was relegated once more. From 1982 to 2010, Akademik spent their longest ever period out of the top division.

After 28 years in the lowers divisions of Bulgarian football, in 2009–10 Akademik finished 2nd in B Group and the club managed to participate in the play-off for promotion in the A PFG. On May 23, 2010, Akademik managed to win the play-off against Nesebar with a result of 2:1 and finally qualified again for the top division.

During the summer of 2010, Akademik announced that the team would play their home games at the Slavia Stadium, home of Slavia Sofia, instead of their usual stadium, Akademik Stadium. This was because Akademik Stadium did not obtain approval from the BFU. The return to the elite proved to be difficult for the Students. Akademik won only 5 games, and drew 5 more, out of 30 games in total. This only earned the team 20 points, which was 5 points below PFC Vidima-Rakovski Sevlievo, who qualified for the relegation playoffs. Despite the bad results, Akademik was above the relegation zone up until round 25 of the season. The biggest highlight for Akademik was probably when the team managed to draw 1–1 against CSKA, the most decorated team in Bulgarian football. However, Akademik was eventually relegated from the A Group at the end of the season after finishing in 15th place.

The team finished 7th in the 2011–12 B Group, meaning they were relegated to the V AFG. However, the team decided not to play the following season, citing financial problems as the main reason. The team was subsequently dissolved in 2012. An unofficial successor, Akademik 1947 Sofia, was founded in 2013. According to the Bulgarian Football Union, the new club is a separate entity and records are not carried over from the original club. The reformed club competed in the fourth level of Bulgarian football until 2025, when the team was relegated and did not register to compete in any competition for the 2025–26 season.

== Honours ==
=== Domestic ===
- A Group:
  - Third place (2): 1950, 1975–76
- B Group:
  - Winners (2): 1963–64, 1979–80
  - Runners-up (1): 2009–10
- Bulgarian Cup:
  - Runners-up (1): 1951

=== European ===
- Balkans Cup
  - Winners (1): 1974
- UEFA Cup
  - 1/16 finalist: 1976–77

=== European cup history ===
Season	Competition	Round	Country	Club	Home	Away	Aggregate
1976–77	UEFA Cup	1	(Czech Republic)	Slavia Prague	3–0	0–2	3–2
1976–77	UEFA Cup	2	(Italy)	A.C. Milan	4–3	0–2	4–5
1981–82	UEFA Cup	1	(Germany)	1. FC Kaiserslautern	0–1	1–2	1–3

== Notable stats ==
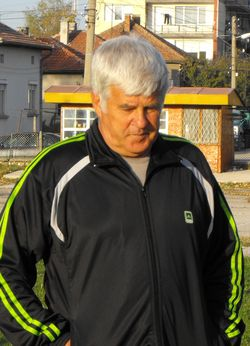
Mladen Vasilev, the club's top scorer in the league

- Most appearances for the club in A PFG

#	Name	Apps
1	(Bulgaria) Iliya Chalev	253
2	(Bulgaria) Yuliyan Ivanov	209
2	(Bulgaria) Mladen Vasilev	209
4	(Bulgaria) Bogomil Simov	177
5	(Bulgaria) Boris Angelov	172
6	(Bulgaria) Lozan Lozanov	156
7	(Bulgaria) Stefan Parvanov	154
8	(Bulgaria) Milen Goranov	147
9	(Bulgaria) Petar Zafirov	141
10	(Bulgaria) Todor Paunov	132

- Most goals for the club in A PFG

#	Name	Gls
1	(Bulgaria) Mladen Vasilev	68
2	(Bulgaria) Milen Goranov	38
3	(Bulgaria) Alyosha Dimitrov	33
4	(Bulgaria) Bogomil Simov	30
5	(Bulgaria) Ivan Trendafilov	26
6	(Bulgaria) Vasil Spasov	21
7	(Bulgaria) Yordan Nikolov	18
8	(Bulgaria) Hristo Konakov	16
9	(Bulgaria) Kiril Milanov	16
10	(Bulgaria) Plamen Tsvetkov	15

== Seasons ==
=== Detailed league history ===
Results of league and cup competitions by season
Season	League											Top goalscorer
Season	Division	Level	P	W	D	L	F	A	GD	Pts	Pos	Top goalscorer
2026–27	B RFG Sofia Capital	5										
