= 1970 Bulgarian Cup final =

- Event: 1969–70 Bulgarian Cup
Levski Sofia	CSKA Sofia
2	1
- Date: 25 August 1970
- Venue: Vasil Levski National Stadium, Sofia
- Referee: Deyan Nachev (Plovdiv)
- Attendance: 46,000

The 1970 Bulgarian Cup final was the 30th final of the Bulgarian Cup (in this period the tournament was named Cup of the Soviet Army), and was contested between Levski Sofia and CSKA Sofia on 25 August 1970 at Vasil Levski National Stadium in Sofia. Levski won the final 2–1.

== Match ==
=== Details ===
25 August 1970

Levski Sofia	2−1	CSKA Sofia
Panov 11'; Veselinov 46'		B. Stankov 71'

Vasil Levski National Stadium, Sofia
Attendance: 45,000
Referee: Deyan Nachev (Plovdiv)

Levski	CSKA

GK	1	(Bulgaria) Georgi Kamenski
DF	2	(Bulgaria) Milko Gaydarski
DF	3	(Bulgaria) Dobromir Zhechev
DF	4	(Bulgaria) Stefan Aladzhov
DF	5	(Bulgaria) Georgi Todorov
MF	6	(Bulgaria) Ivan Stoyanov
FW	7	(Bulgaria) Tsvetan Veselinov
MF	8	(Bulgaria) Stefan Pavlov
FW	9	(Bulgaria) Georgi Asparuhov (c)
FW	10	(Bulgaria) Pavel Panov
MF	11	(Bulgaria) Vasil Mitkov
Substitutes:
Manager:
(Czechoslovakia) Rudolf Vytlačil

GK	1	(Bulgaria) Stoyan Yordanov
DF	2	(Bulgaria) Ivan Zafirov	(substituted off) 38'
DF	3	(Bulgaria) Dimitar Penev
DF	4	(Bulgaria) Boris Gaganelov (c)
MF	5	(Bulgaria) Boris Stankov
MF	6	(Bulgaria) Georgi Denev
MF	7	(Bulgaria) Tsvetan Atanasov
MF	8	(Bulgaria) Asparuh Nikodimov
FW	9	(Bulgaria) Petar Zhekov	(substituted off) 22'
FW	10	(Bulgaria) Dimitar Yakimov
FW	11	(Bulgaria) Dimitar Marashliev
Substitutes:
FW	--	(Bulgaria) Plamen Yankov	(substituted in) 22'
DF	--	(Bulgaria) Kiril Stankov	(substituted in) 38'
Manager:
(Bulgaria) Manol Manolov

== See also ==
- 1969–70 A Group
