= 1969 Bulgarian Cup final =

- Event: 1968–69 Bulgarian Cup
CSKA Sofia	Levski Sofia
2	1
- Date: 30 April 1969
- Venue: Vasil Levski National Stadium, Sofia
- Referee: Todor Gerov (Sofia)
- Attendance: 40,000

The 1969 Bulgarian Cup final was the 29th final of the Bulgarian Cup (in this period the tournament was named Cup of the Soviet Army), and was contested between CSKA Sofia and Levski Sofia on 30 April 1969 at Vasil Levski National Stadium in Sofia. CSKA won the final 2–1.

== Match ==
=== Details ===
30 April 1969

CSKA Sofia	2−1	Levski Sofia
Marashliev 50'; Zhekov 86'		Mitkov 20'

Vasil Levski National Stadium, Sofia
Attendance: 40,000
Referee: Todor Gerov (Sofia)

CSKA	Levski

GK	1	(Bulgaria) Yordan Filipov
DF	2	(Bulgaria) Boris Gaganelov
DF	3	(Bulgaria) Kiril Stankov
DF	4	(Bulgaria) Hristo Marinchev
MF	5	(Bulgaria) Boris Stankov
DF	6	(Bulgaria) Dimitar Penev
FW	7	(Bulgaria) Dimitar Marashliev
FW	8	(Bulgaria) Nikola Tsanev (c)
FW	9	(Bulgaria) Petar Zhekov
MF	10	(Bulgaria) Dimitar Yakimov
MF	11	(Bulgaria) Asparuh Nikodimov
Manager:
(Bulgaria) Stoyan Ormandzhiev

GK	1	(Bulgaria) Georgi Kamenski
DF	2	(Bulgaria) Stoichko Peshev
DF	3	(Bulgaria) Dobromir Zhechev
DF	4	(Bulgaria) Stefan Aladzhov
DF	5	(Bulgaria) Kiril Ivkov
MF	6	(Bulgaria) Georgi Panov
FW	7	(Bulgaria) Tsvetan Veselinov
MF	8	(Bulgaria) Vasil Mitkov
FW	9	(Bulgaria) Georgi Asparuhov (c)
MF	10	(Bulgaria) Yanko Kirilov
FW	11	(Bulgaria) Aleksandar Kostov
Manager:
(Bulgaria) Krastyo Chakarov

== See also ==
- 1968–69 A Group
