= List of PFC CSKA Sofia managers =

The following is a chronological list of all those who have held the position of manager of the first team of PFC CSKA Sofia.

== List of managers ==
Name	Nationality	From	Until	Honours
Konstantin Nikolov	Bulgaria	May 1948	November 1948	1 Bulgarian League
Krum Milev	Bulgaria	November 1948	June 1964	11 Bulgarian Leagues; 4 Bulgarian Cups
Grigoriy Pinaychev	Soviet Union	June 1964	June 1965	1 Bulgarian Cup
Stoyan Ormandzhiev	Bulgaria	July 1965	June 1969	2 Bulgarian Leagues; 1 Bulgarian Cup
Manol Manolov	Bulgaria	July 1969	February 1974	3 Bulgarian Leagues; 2 Bulgarian Cups
Nikola Kovachev	Bulgaria	February 1974	June 1974	1 Bulgarian Cup
Manol Manolov	Bulgaria	June 1974	June 1975	1 Bulgarian League
Sergi Yotsov	Bulgaria	July 1975	June 1977	1 Bulgarian League
Nikola Kovachev	Bulgaria	June 1977	April 1979	–
Asparuh Nikodimov	Bulgaria	April 1979	September 1982	3 Bulgarian Leagues; 1 Bulgarian Cup
Stefan Bozhkov	Bulgaria	September 1982	October 1982	–
Boris Stankov	Bulgaria	October 1982	November 1982	–
Apostol Chachevski	Bulgaria	November 1982	April 1983	–
Manol Manolov	Bulgaria	April 1983	June 1985	1 Bulgarian League; 2 Bulgarian Cups
Sergi Yotsov	Bulgaria	June 1985	December 1985	–
Dimitar Penev	Bulgaria	December 1985	January 1991	3 Bulgarian Leagues; 6 Bulgarian Cups; 1 Bulgarian Supercup
Asparuh Nikodimov	Bulgaria	January 1991	June 1992	1 Bulgarian League
Tsvetan Yonchev	Bulgaria	June 1992	June 1993	1 Bulgarian Cup
Gjoko Hadžievski	Republic of Macedonia	June 1993	January 1994	–
Boris Gaganelov	Bulgaria	January 1994	June 1994	–
Bozhil Kolev	Bulgaria	June 1994	12 September 1994	–
Tsvetan Yonchev	Bulgaria	12 September 1994	28 September 1994	–
Spas Dzhevizov	Bulgaria	28 September 1994	October 1994	–
Hristo Andonov	Bulgaria	October 1994	April 1995	–
Tsvetan Atanasov	Bulgaria	April 1995	2 June 1995	–
Plamen Markov	Bulgaria	2 June 1995	December 1995	–
Georgi Vasilev	Bulgaria	January 1995	March 1998	1 Bulgarian League; 1 Bulgarian Cup
Petar Zehtinski	Bulgaria	March 1998	June 1998	–
Dimitar Penev	Bulgaria	June 1998	4 March 2000	1 Bulgarian Cup
Spas Dzhevizov	Bulgaria	5 March 2000	23 April 2000	–
Aleksandar Stankov	Bulgaria	23 April 2000	May 2000	–
Enrico Catuzzi	Italy	June 2000	December 2000	–
Aleksandar Stankov	Bulgaria	December 2000	3 March 2001	–
Enrico Catuzzi	Italy	3 March 2001	June 2001	–
Asparuh Nikodimov	Bulgaria	June 2001	December 2001	–
Luigi Simoni	Italy	December 2001	May 2002	–
Stoycho Mladenov	Bulgaria	June 2002	15 October 2003	1 Bulgarian League
Aleksandar Stankov	Bulgaria	15 October 2003	February 2004	–
Ferario Spasov	Bulgaria	February 2004	February 2005	–
Miodrag Ješić	Serbia and Montenegro	February 2005	4 April 2006	1 Bulgarian League
Plamen Markov	Bulgaria	4 April 2006	12 March 2007	1 Bulgarian Cup; 1 Bulgarian Supercup
Stoycho Mladenov	Bulgaria	12 March 2007	9 July 2008	1 Bulgarian League
Dimitar Penev	Bulgaria	9 July 2008	5 March 2009	1 Bulgarian Supercup
Lyuboslav Penev	Bulgaria	5 March 2009	13 January 2010	–
Ioan Andone	Romania	17 January 2010	30 March 2010	–
Adalbert Zafirov*	Bulgaria	30 March 2010	21 April 2010	–
Dimitar Penev	Bulgaria	21 April 2010	1 June 2010	–
Pavel Dochev	Bulgaria	1 June 2010	16 August 2010	–
Gjore Jovanovski	Republic of Macedonia	17 August 2010	21 October 2010	–
Milen Radukanov	Bulgaria	21 October 2010	23 October 2011	1 Bulgarian Cup; 1 Bulgarian Supercup
Dimitar Penev	Bulgaria	23 October 2011	5 March 2012	–
Stoycho Mladenov	Bulgaria	5 March 2012	4 January 2013	–
Miodrag Ješić	Serbia	7 January 2013	11 March 2013	–
Milen Radukanov	Bulgaria	11 March 2013	30 June 2013	–
Hristo Stoichkov	Bulgaria	5 June 2013	8 July 2013	–
Stoycho Mladenov	Bulgaria	10 July 2013	20 March 2015	–
Galin Ivanov	Bulgaria	24 March 2015	28 April 2015	–
Lyuboslav Penev	Bulgaria	28 April 2015	31 May 2015	–
Hristo Yanev	Bulgaria	26 June 2015	21 August 2016	1 Bulgarian Cup; 1 Bulgarian V AFG Title
Edward Iordănescu	Romania	24 August 2016	27 November 2016	–
Stamen Belchev	Bulgaria	28 November 2016	1 May 2018	–
Hristo Yanev*	Bulgaria	1 May 2018	20 May 2018	–
Nestor El Maestro	England	6 June 2018	7 February 2019	–
Lyuboslav Penev	Bulgaria	8 February 2019	3 May 2019	–
Dobromir Mitov	Bulgaria	3 May 2019	21 July 2019	–
Ljupko Petrović	Serbia	21 July 2019	2 October 2019	–
Dobromir Mitov*	Bulgaria	2 October 2019	7 October 2019	–
Miloš Kruščić	Serbia	7 October 2019	2 July 2020	–
Stamen Belchev	Bulgaria	2 July 2020	26 October 2020	–
Daniel Morales*	Brazil	26 October 2020	11 November 2020	–
Bruno Akrapović	Bosnia and Herzegovina	11 November 2020	28 March 2021	–
Lyuboslav Penev	Bulgaria	28 March 2021	26 July 2021	1 Bulgarian Cup
Stoycho Mladenov	Bulgaria	26 July 2021	14 April 2022	–
Alan Pardew	England	15 April 2022	1 June 2022	–
Saša Ilić	Serbia	2 June 2022	28 July 2023	–
Nestor El Maestro	England	29 July 2023	14 April 2024	–
Stamen Belchev*	Bulgaria	15 April 2024	31 May 2024	–
Tomislav Stipić	Croatia	4 June 2024	28 August 2024	–
Aleksandar Tomash	Bulgaria	28 August 2024	31 May 2025	–
Dušan Kerkez	Bosnia and Herzegovina	4 June 2025	20 September 2025	–
Valentin Iliev*	Bulgaria	20 September 2025	24 September 2025	–
Hristo Yanev	Bulgaria	24 September 2025	9 September 2026	1 Bulgarian Cup; 1 Bulgarian Supercup
Daniel Morales*	Brazil	10 September 2026	29 September 2026	–
Markus Gisdol	Germany	29 September 2026	Present	–

Key
*Served as caretaker manager.

As of 29 September 2026
