= 1965–66 A Group =

22nd season of top-tier football league in Bulgaria

A Group
- Season: 1965–66
- Champions: CSKA Sofia (13th title)
- Relegated: Spartak Varna; Spartak Pleven
- European Cup: CSKA Sofia
- Inter-Cities Fairs Cup: Spartak Plovdiv
- Matches played: 240
- Goals scored: 611 (2.55 per match)
- Top goalscorer: Traycho Spasov (21 goals)

The 1965–66 A Group was the 18th season of the A Football Group, the top Bulgarian professional league for association football clubs, since its establishment in 1948.

== Overview ==
It was contested by 16 teams, and CSKA Sofia won the championship.

== League standings ==
| Pos | Team | Pld | W | D | L | GF | GA | GD | Pts | Qualification or relegation |
|---|---|---|---|---|---|---|---|---|---|---|
| 1 | CSKA Sofia (C) | 30 | 17 | 8 | 5 | 53 | 30 | +23 | 42 | Qualification for European Cup preliminary round |
| 2 | Levski Sofia | 30 | 15 | 11 | 4 | 59 | 31 | +28 | 41 | |
| 3 | Slavia Sofia | 30 | 16 | 7 | 7 | 38 | 25 | +13 | 39 | Qualification for Cup Winners' Cup first round |
| 4 | Spartak Sofia | 30 | 14 | 8 | 8 | 45 | 30 | +15 | 36 | |
| 5 | Lokomotiv Plovdiv | 30 | 12 | 7 | 11 | 36 | 33 | +3 | 31 | |
| 6 | Beroe Stara Zagora | 30 | 10 | 10 | 10 | 41 | 41 | 0 | 30 | |
| 7 | Dunav Ruse | 30 | 12 | 6 | 12 | 29 | 40 | −11 | 30 | |
| 8 | Lokomotiv Sofia | 30 | 10 | 9 | 11 | 46 | 35 | +11 | 29 | |
| 9 | Spartak Plovdiv | 30 | 9 | 10 | 11 | 28 | 42 | −14 | 28 | Invitation for Inter-Cities Fairs Cup second round |
| 10 | Botev Plovdiv | 30 | 9 | 9 | 12 | 41 | 39 | +2 | 27 | |
| 11 | Cherno More Varna | 30 | 8 | 11 | 11 | 30 | 35 | −5 | 27 | |
| 12 | Marek Dupnitsa | 30 | 9 | 9 | 12 | 39 | 51 | −12 | 27 | |
| 13 | Botev Vratsa | 30 | 9 | 7 | 14 | 30 | 41 | −11 | 25 | |
| 14 | Chernomorets Burgas | 30 | 8 | 9 | 13 | 34 | 48 | −14 | 25 | |
| 15 | Spartak Varna (R) | 30 | 6 | 10 | 14 | 32 | 48 | −16 | 22 | Relegation to 1966–67 B Group |
| 16 | Spartak Pleven (R) | 30 | 6 | 9 | 15 | 30 | 42 | −12 | 21 | Relegation to 1966–67 B Group |

Source: rsssf.com
(C) Champions; (R) Relegated

== Results ==
| Home \ Away | BSZ | BPD | BVR | CHM | CHB | CSK | DUN | LEV | LPL | LSO | MAR | SLA | SPL | SPD | SSF | SPV |
|---|---|---|---|---|---|---|---|---|---|---|---|---|---|---|---|---|
| Beroe Stara Zagora | | 1–0 | 4–1 | 1–0 | 5–0 | 2–2 | 3–3 | 2–2 | 1–0 | 2–0 | 1–1 | 1–2 | 2–1 | 0–0 | 1–0 | 2–1 |
| Botev Plovdiv | 1–1 | | 0–0 | 1–0 | 2–0 | 1–1 | 1–0 | 0–1 | 0–3 | 0–3 | 9–0 | 1–0 | 4–0 | 4–1 | 2–1 | 0–1 |
| Botev Vratsa | 1–1 | 2–2 | | 1–0 | 0–0 | 0–0 | 3–0 | 1–1 | 2–0 | 2–2 | 1–0 | 4–0 | 2–0 | 1–2 | 1–0 | 2–0 |
| Cherno More | 1–0 | 2–2 | 2–0 | | 0–0 | 0–1 | 1–1 | 1–0 | 1–0 | 1–1 | 2–0 | 0–0 | 3–2 | 3–1 | 0–0 | 2–2 |
| Chernomorets Burgas | 1–0 | 3–0 | 2–1 | 2–0 | | 0–0 | 3–0 | 2–5 | 1–0 | 2–3 | 1–2 | 2–2 | 1–0 | 2–2 | 1–2 | 2–1 |
| CSKA Sofia | 1–1 | 3–1 | 2–1 | 4–2 | 4–2 | | 2–0 | 1–0 | 2–1 | 0–0 | 3–0 | 0–2 | 3–2 | 6–0 | 1–2 | 2–1 |
| Dunav Ruse | 1–0 | 3–1 | 6–0 | 2–1 | 1–0 | 0–3 | | 1–1 | 1–4 | 1–0 | 1–0 | 1–0 | 0–0 | 2–1 | 0–0 | 1–0 |
| Levski Sofia | 3–3 | 4–2 | 3–0 | 1–1 | 4–2 | 0–3 | 3–0 | | 4–0 | 3–0 | 4–3 | 3–0 | 5–1 | 0–0 | 1–1 | 3–2 |
| Lokomotiv Plovdiv | 3–1 | 0–1 | 2–0 | 2–0 | 1–1 | 0–0 | 4–1 | 0–0 | | 0–0 | 0–2 | 0–0 | 2–0 | 2–0 | 1–0 | 2–1 |
| Lokomotiv Sofia | 6–1 | 2–2 | 3–0 | 2–1 | 4–1 | 0–1 | 0–1 | 0–0 | 3–2 | | 2–2 | 1–2 | 1–0 | 4–0 | 0–1 | 6–0 |
| Marek Dupnitsa | 1–3 | 2–1 | 1–0 | 2–2 | 2–0 | 2–3 | 1–0 | 2–2 | 2–2 | 1–1 | | 0–1 | 4–1 | 1–0 | 4–2 | 0–0 |
| Slavia Sofia | 1–1 | 1–0 | 1–2 | 1–1 | 1–0 | 1–0 | 0–1 | 1–0 | 5–1 | 1–0 | 2–0 | | 2–1 | 2–0 | 1–1 | 3–1 |
| Spartak Pleven | 3–0 | 0–0 | 3–1 | 3–0 | 1–1 | 1–2 | 2–0 | 1–1 | 0–0 | 0–0 | 2–0 | 0–2 | | 3–1 | 0–0 | 0–0 |
| Spartak Plovdiv | 1–0 | 1–1 | 1–0 | 1–1 | 0–0 | 2–1 | 1–1 | 0–1 | 2–0 | 1–0 | 1–1 | 2–1 | 1–0 | | 0–0 | 3–0 |
| Spartak Sofia | 2–0 | 2–1 | 2–1 | 1–0 | 4–1 | 5–1 | 3–0 | 0–1 | 2–3 | 3–0 | 2–1 | 0–2 | 2–2 | 4–2 | | 1–0 |
| Spartak Varna | 2–1 | 1–1 | 1–0 | 1–2 | 1–1 | 1–1 | 2–0 | 1–3 | 0–1 | 4–2 | 2–2 | 1–1 | 2–1 | 1–1 | 2–2 | |

Source: A PFG (in Bulgarian)
Legend: Blue = home team win; Yellow = draw; Red = away team win.

== Champions ==
CSKA Sofia

Goalkeepers
| (Bulgaria) Stoyan Yordanov | 10 | (0) |
| (Bulgaria) Yordan Filipov | 24 | (0) |

Defenders
| (Bulgaria) Nikola Kovachev | 7 | (0) |
| (Bulgaria) Dimitar Penev | 24 | (3) |
| (Bulgaria) Ivan Vasilev | 30 | (2) |
| (Bulgaria) Ivan Zafirov | 16 | (1) |
| (Bulgaria) Hristo Marinchev | 16 | (1) |
| (Bulgaria) Boris Gaganelov | 24 | (0) |
| (Bulgaria) Stefan Iliev | 4 | (0) |

Midfielders
| (Bulgaria) Boris Stankov | 27 | (2) |
| (Bulgaria) Asparuh Nikodimov | 27 | (5) |
| (Bulgaria) Stoichko Peshev | 3 | (0) |
| (Bulgaria) Vasil Romanov | 24 | (2) |
| (Bulgaria) Tsvetan Atanasov | 12 | (0) |
| (Bulgaria) Kiril Raykov | 8 | (1) |
| (Bulgaria) Yanko Kirilov | 12 | (6) |

Forwards
| (Bulgaria) Ivan Kolev | 24 | (3) |
| (Bulgaria) Evden Kamenov | 21 | (4) |
| (Bulgaria) Nikola Tsanev | 28 | (16) |
| (Bulgaria) Dimitar Yakimov | 17 | (5) |
| (Bulgaria) Stoyan Stoyanov | 2 | (0) |

Manager
| (Bulgaria) Stoyan Ormandzhiev |

== Top scorers ==
| Rank | Scorer | Club | Goals |
|---|---|---|---|
| 1 | (Bulgaria) Traycho Spasov | Marek Dupnitsa | 21 |
| 2 | (Bulgaria) Petar Zhekov | Beroe Stara Zagora | 20 |
| 3 | (Bulgaria) Nikola Kotkov | Lokomotiv Sofia | 17 |
| 4 | (Bulgaria) Nikola Tsanev | CSKA Sofia | 16 |
| 4 | (Bulgaria) Vasil Mitkov | Spartak Sofia | 16 |
| 6 | (Bulgaria) Nikola Yordanov | Dunav Ruse | 14 |
| 6 | (Bulgaria) Dobrin Nenov | Botev Plovdiv | 14 |
| 8 | (Bulgaria) Georgi Asparuhov | Levski Sofia | 13 |
| 8 | (Bulgaria) Hristo Dishkov | Spartak Plovdiv | 13 |
