= 1972 Bulgarian Cup final =

- Event: 1971–72 Bulgarian Cup
CSKA Sofia	Slavia Sofia
3	0
- Date: 12 July 1972
- Venue: Vasil Levski National Stadium, Sofia
- Referee: Petar Nikolov (Sofia)
- Attendance: 25,000

The 1972 Bulgarian Cup final was the 32nd final of the Bulgarian Cup (in this period the tournament was named Cup of the Soviet Army), and was contested between CSKA Sofia and Slavia Sofia on 12 July 1972 at Vasil Levski National Stadium in Sofia. CSKA won the final 3–0.

== Match ==
=== Details ===
12 July 1972

CSKA Sofia	3−0	Slavia Sofia
Zhekov 18'; Marashliev 28', 55' (pen.)

Vasil Levski National Stadium, Sofia
Attendance: 25,000
Referee: Petar Nikolov (Sofia)

CSKA	Slavia

GK	1	(Bulgaria) Stoyan Yordanov
DF	2	(Bulgaria) Ivan Zafirov
DF	3	(Bulgaria) Bozhil Kolev	(substituted off) 64'
DF	4	(Bulgaria) Boris Gaganelov
MF	5	(Bulgaria) Kiril Stankov
DF	6	(Bulgaria) Dimitar Penev (c)
MF	7	(Bulgaria) Tsvetan Atanasov	(substituted in) 60'
MF	8	(Bulgaria) Asparuh Nikodimov
FW	9	(Bulgaria) Petar Zhekov
FW	10	(Bulgaria) Georgi Denev
FW	11	(Bulgaria) Dimitar Marashliev
Substitutes:
DF	--	(Bulgaria) Todor Simov	(substituted in) 60'
MF	--	(Bulgaria) Borislav Sredkov	(substituted in) 64'
Manager:
(Bulgaria) Manol Manolov

GK	1	(Bulgaria) Petar Tsolov
DF	2	(Bulgaria) Yancho Dimitrov
DF	3	(Bulgaria) Aleksandar Shalamanov (c)
DF	4	(Bulgaria) Viktor Yonov
DF	5	(Bulgaria) Emanuil Manolov	(substituted off) 46'
DF	6	(Bulgaria) Nikolay Krastev (yellow card) (yellow-red card) 38'
FW	7	(Bulgaria) Atanas Aleksandrov
MF	8	(Bulgaria) Lyuben Tasev
FW	9	(Bulgaria) Bozhidar Grigorov
FW	10	(Bulgaria) Andrey Zhelyazkov
MF	11	(Bulgaria) Stoyan Kotsev	(substituted off) 71'
Substitutes:
MF	--	(Bulgaria) Georgi Haralampiev	(substituted in) 46'
FW	--	(Bulgaria) Mihail Mihaylov	(substituted in) 71'
Manager:
(Bulgaria) Aleksandar Iliev

== See also ==
- 1971–72 A Group
