= 1968–69 A Group =

25th season of top-tier football league in Bulgaria

A Group
- Season: 1968–69
- Champions: CSKA Sofia (14th title)
- Relegated: Dobrudzha
- European Cup: CSKA
- Inter-Cities Fairs Cup: Lokomotiv Plovdiv; Slavia
- Matches: 225
- Goals: 713 (3.17 per match)
- Top goalscorer: Petar Zhekov (36 goals)

The 1968–69 A Group was the 21st season of the A Football Group, the top Bulgarian professional league for association football clubs, since its establishment in 1948.

== Overview ==
It was contested by 16 teams, and CSKA Sofia won the championship.

== League standings ==
Pos	Team	Pld	W	D	L	GF	GA	GD	Pts	Qualification or relegation
1	CSKA Sofia (C)	30	22	3	5	74	38	+36	47	Qualification for European Cup first round
2	Levski Sofia	30	17	6	7	59	33	+26	40	Qualification for Cup Winners' Cup first round
3	Lokomotiv Plovdiv	30	16	7	7	53	40	+13	39	Invitation for Inter-Cities Fairs Cup first round
4	Cherno More Varna	30	13	12	5	44	27	+17	38	
5	Slavia Sofia	30	15	7	8	54	33	+21	37	Invitation for Inter-Cities Fairs Cup first round
6	Botev Plovdiv	30	11	6	13	51	48	+3	28	
7	Chernomorets Burgas	30	10	8	12	51	56	−5	28	
8	Botev Vratsa	30	10	7	13	48	51	−3	27	
9	Spartak Pleven	30	12	3	15	44	52	−8	27	
10	Minyor Pernik	30	10	7	13	42	53	−11	27	
11	Akademik Sofia	30	8	10	12	32	35	−3	26	
12	Beroe Stara Zagora	30	10	6	14	36	45	−9	26	
13	Dunav Ruse	30	10	5	15	36	48	−12	25	
14	Marek Dupnitsa	30	9	7	14	34	46	−12	25	
15	Dobrudzha Dobrich (R)	30	8	8	14	32	44	−12	24	Relegation to 1969–70 B Group
16	Lokomotiv Sofia (R)	30	7	2	21	23	64	−41	16	Merged with Slavia Sofia (Note: Slavia Sofia and Lokomotiv Sofia were merged into ZhSK-Slavia Sofia that took over Slavia's points total. No team replaced Lokomotiv, so they were awarded 0–3 losses during the second half of the season.)

Source: rsssf.com
(C) Champions; (R) Relegated

== Results ==
Home \ Away	AKD	BSZ	BPD	BVR	CHM	CHB	CSK	DOB	DUN	LEV	LPL	LSO	MAR	MIN	SLA	SPL
Akademik Sofia		2–0	2–1	2–2	0–2	1–1	1–1	0–0	3–1	1–2	0–0	3–0 (Note: Match awarded)	0–0	1–1	1–0	0–0
Beroe Stara Zagora	2–0		3–1	0–0	0–1	1–2	0–2	2–0	2–1	1–1	3–2	3–0	5–1	2–0	3–0	3–0
Botev Plovdiv	1–0	3–0		3–2	0–0	2–3	1–2	2–0	3–0	2–1	1–1	3–0	2–2	5–0	1–1	1–0
Botev Vratsa	1–2	2–0	5–1		1–0	2–2	1–2	4–0	2–1	1–1	3–3	3–0	5–0	3–0	0–0	2–1
Cherno More	1–0	0–0	2–1	1–0		2–0	0–1	1–1	1–0	0–0	3–3	2–0	0–0	2–0	1–1	6–1
Chernomorets Burgas	2–0	5–1	5–3	1–1	0–0		1–2	2–2	0–1	1–2	3–1	0–2	2–1	4–0	2–2	5–2
CSKA Sofia	3–3	7–1	4–2	4–0	3–1	7–0		2–0	3–2	2–7	2–1	3–0	1–0	4–1	3–1	3–1
Dobrudzha Dobrich	1–0	0–0	0–4	3–0	0–1	2–2	1–0		1–1	3–0	0–0	1–3	2–0	0–0	3–1	4–0
Dunav Ruse	3–2	2–1	2–0	1–1	2–2	5–1	0–2	1–0		1–2	0–2	3–0	0–0	2–1	0–1	1–0
Levski Sofia	0–2	1–1	3–0	2–0	4–1	5–2	1–3	2–1	3–0		1–2	3–2	1–0	4–0	2–2	4–1
Lokomotiv Plovdiv	2–1	1–0	0–0	2–1	2–2	1–0	3–4	3–1	3–2	1–0		3–0	3–1	2–0	3–0	3–0
Lokomotiv Sofia	2–1	0–0	2–1	5–1	0–3	0–3	2–2	0–3	1–0	0–3	0–2		0–1	0–3	0–3	0–3
Marek Dupnitsa	1–1	3–0	4–2	1–0	1–5	3–1	0–1	3–0	1–2	0–1	2–3	3–0		2–1	1–2	2–1
Minyor Pernik	2–3	3–1	2–2	3–1	3–1	1–1	4–1	2–1	1–1	2–2	4–0	2–1	1–1		1–0	4–1
Slavia Sofia	1–0	3–1	0–2	6–1	1–1	1–1	2–0	3–2	5–0	1–0	4–0	3–2	4–0	3–0		2–0
Spartak Pleven	2–0	2–0	2–1	6–3	2–2	3–1	1–0	5–0	4–1	0–1	2–1	0–1	0–0	2–0	2–1	

Source: A PFG (in Bulgarian)
Legend: Blue = home team win; Yellow = draw; Red = away team win.

== Champions ==
CSKA Sofia

Goalkeepers
(Bulgaria) Stoyan Yordanov	20	(0)
(Bulgaria) Yordan Filipov	14	(0)
(Bulgaria) Stancho Bonchev	2	(0)

Defenders
(Bulgaria) Kiril Stankov	28	(0)
(Bulgaria) Dimitar Penev	28	(3)
(Bulgaria) Ivan Zafirov	19	(0)
(Bulgaria) Hristo Marinchev	16	(0)
(Bulgaria) Boris Gaganelov	24	(0)
(Bulgaria) Vasil Nedelchev	5	(0)
(Bulgaria) Rusi Penchev	14	(0)

Midfielders
(Bulgaria) Boris Stankov	13	(0)
(Bulgaria) Asparuh Nikodimov	28	(4)
(Bulgaria) Petar Patsev	2	(1)
(Bulgaria) Peyu Nikolov	10	(1)
(Bulgaria) Tsvetan Atanasov	25	(4)

Forwards
(Bulgaria) Petar Zhekov	29	(36)
(Bulgaria) Dimitar Marashliev	28	(4)
(Bulgaria) Nikola Tsanev	24	(5)
(Bulgaria) Emil Simov	1	(1)
(Bulgaria) Dimitar Yakimov	24	(12)

Manager
(Bulgaria) Stoyan Ormandzhiev

== Top scorers ==
Rank	Scorer	Club	Goals
1	(Bulgaria) Petar Zhekov	CSKA Sofia	36
2	(Bulgaria) Georgi Asparuhov	Levski Sofia	22
3	(Bulgaria) Dinko Dermendzhiev	Botev Plovdiv	21
3	(Bulgaria) Totko Dremsizov	Chernomorets Burgas	21
5	(Bulgaria) Bozhidar Grigorov	Slavia Sofia	17
5	(Bulgaria) Georgi Kamenov	Botev Vratsa	17
7	(Bulgaria) Hristo Bonev	Lokomotiv Plovdiv	16
7	(Bulgaria) Stefan Bogomilov	Cherno More Varna	16
9	(Bulgaria) Mihail Mishev	Spartak Pleven	14
10	(Bulgaria) Stoyan Marinov	Dunav Ruse	13
