= 1972–73 A Group =

29th season of top-tier football league in Bulgaria

A Group
- Season: 1972–73
- Champions: CSKA Sofia (17th title)
- Relegated: Tundzha; Volov
- European Cup: CSKA
- UEFA Cup: Lokomotiv Plovdiv; Slavia
- Matches played: 304
- Goals scored: 848 (2.79 per match)
- Top goalscorer: Petar Zhekov (29 goals)

The 1972–73 A Group was the 25th season of the A Football Group, the top Bulgarian professional league for association football clubs, since its establishment in 1948.

== Overview ==
It was contested by 18 teams, and CSKA Sofia won the championship.

== League standings ==
Pos	Team	Pld	W	D	L	GF	GA	GD	Pts	Qualification or relegation
1	CSKA Sofia (C)	34	22	7	5	80	40	+40	51	Qualification for European Cup first round
2	Lokomotiv Plovdiv	34	18	7	9	62	38	+24	43	Qualification for UEFA Cup first round
3	Slavia Sofia	33	16	11	6	55	33	+22	43	Qualification for UEFA Cup first round
4	Levski Sofia	34	15	10	9	62	37	+25	40	
5	Akademik Sofia	34	15	8	11	61	43	+18	38	
6	Dunav Ruse (Note: Following the end of the season, after allegations of match fixing and allocation of funds for briberies, Dunav and Chernomorets were relegated from the group, while the matches Slavia - Spartak Varna and Spartak Pleven - Tundzha were annulled.) (R)	34	14	9	11	42	41	+1	37	Relegation to 1973–74 B Group
7	Lokomotiv Sofia	34	14	9	11	44	44	0	37	
8	Botev Vratsa	34	13	7	14	48	55	−7	33	
9	Botev Plovdiv	34	12	8	14	44	44	0	32	
10	Cherno More Varna	34	12	8	14	51	54	−3	32	
11	Spartak Pleven	33	13	5	15	46	51	−5	31	
12	Chernomorets Burgas (R)	34	12	7	15	35	44	−9	31	Relegation to 1973–74 B Group
13	Beroe Stara Zagora	34	12	6	16	50	47	+3	30	Qualification for Cup Winners' Cup first round
14	Minyor Pernik	34	8	14	12	35	54	−19	30	
15	Spartak Varna	33	10	9	14	34	49	−15	29	
16	Etar Veliko Tarnovo	34	7	14	13	37	49	−12	28	
17	Tundzha Yambol (R)	33	9	7	17	37	55	−18	25	Relegation to 1973–74 B Group
18	Volov Shumen (R)	34	6	6	22	25	70	−45	18	Relegation to 1973–74 B Group

Source: rsssf.com
(C) Champions; (R) Relegated

== Results ==
Home \ Away	AKD	BSZ	BPD	BVR	CHM	CHB	CSK	DUN	ETA	LEV	LPL	LSO	MIN	SLA	SPL	SPV	TUN	VOL
Akademik Sofia		4–1	0–0	1–0	3–3	2–1	2–3	1–0	3–2	1–1	0–1	7–0	1–1	1–2	4–0	4–0	4–1	1–0
Beroe Stara Zagora	0–2		1–3	4–0	3–1	4–0	2–0	5–1	1–1	1–0	0–3	3–1	4–0	2–2	2–0	1–1	1–0	4–0
Botev Plovdiv	3–2	3–1		3–1	1–1	0–0	1–3	0–2	0–0	1–0	3–4	2–3	1–1	2–1	2–0	4–1	1–0	3–0
Botev Vratsa	4–1	3–1	5–2		3–1	1–0	1–2	1–1	1–0	1–1	3–1	1–0	0–0	1–0	2–2	2–0	3–1	2–1
Cherno More	0–1	1–0	1–1	3–2		3–0	1–3	2–3	2–1	2–1	0–0	0–1	2–0	2–3	2–0	3–1	3–1	3–1
Chernomorets Burgas	3–2	1–0	0–0	3–1	2–1		2–0	1–0	0–0	1–0	0–1	0–0	1–0	2–0	0–0	1–0	1–0	3–0
CSKA Sofia	0–2	1–0	3–1	5–3	2–1	3–1		4–0	2–0	2–2	2–0	2–0	3–0	1–1	3–1	4–1	8–1	7–1
Dunav Ruse	1–1	2–0	1–0	3–1	1–0	1–0	2–2		1–0	1–1	0–1	1–0	2–1	1–0	0–0	1–1	3–0	0–0
Etar Veliko Tarnovo	2–1	2–2	2–1	3–0	0–0	2–1	2–2	1–1		0–0	3–0	1–1	1–1	1–1	2–3	1–1	2–0	0–0
Levski Sofia	1–2	4–0	2–1	0–0	4–1	3–1	1–2	4–1	5–2		2–1	5–0	4–2	1–1	1–0	2–2	5–1	3–1
Lokomotiv Plovdiv	2–0	1–0	0–1	5–1	1–1	3–3	0–1	4–0	3–0	2–1		5–1	4–1	2–2	3–2	1–1	3–2	1–0
Lokomotiv Sofia	1–1	2–0	1–0	0–0	2–2	3–2	2–0	2–0	0–0	0–1	1–0		0–1	5–1	4–0	3–3	3–1	2–0
Minyor Pernik	3–3	2–2	0–2	2–1	2–2	2–1	3–1	1–1	1–0	2–1	2–2	0–0		0–0	1–2	0–0	1–0	4–1
Slavia Sofia	2–0	1–0	3–2	1–1	3–0	4–1	0–0	4–1	5–1	0–0	2–1	1–0	5–0		1–0	– (Note: The matches Slavia Sofia – Spartak Varna and Spartak Pleven – Tundzha Yambol were annulled. The games were rated with a goalless defeat.)	3–1	2–0
Spartak Pleven	1–2	2–1	3–0	3–0	3–1	3–1	3–3	1–4	6–3	0–1	2–1	2–1	0–0	2–0		3–0	–	2–0
Spartak Varna	1–0	0–4	1–0	3–1	1–3	2–0	1–3	1–0	1–0	0–2	0–1	0–0	2–0	0–2	2–0		0–0	6–1
Tundzha Yambol	2–1	3–0	0–0	1–2	4–1	2–1	1–1	1–0	2–0	2–2	1–1	1–2	1–1	1–1	2–0	0–1		1–0
Volov Shumen	1–1	0–0	1–0	1–0	0–2	1–1	1–2	0–6	1–2	3–1	0–4	1–3	4–0	1–1	2–0	2–0	0–3	

Source: A PFG (in Bulgarian)
Legend: Blue = home team win; Yellow = draw; Red = away team win.

== Champions ==
CSKA Sofia

Goalkeepers
(Bulgaria) Stoyan Yordanov	22	(0)
(Bulgaria) Yordan Filipov	12	(0)
(Bulgaria) Drazho Stoyanov	4	(0)

Defenders
(Bulgaria) Kiril Stankov	28	(1)
(Bulgaria) Dimitar Penev	24	(3)
(Bulgaria) Ivan Zafirov	31	(1)
(Bulgaria) Todor Simov	14	(1)
(Bulgaria) Boris Gaganelov	34	(0)
(Bulgaria) Bozhil Kolev	34	(6)

Midfielders
(Bulgaria) Borislav Sredkov	17	(1)
(Bulgaria) Asparuh Nikodimov	32	(2)
(Bulgaria) Plamen Yankov	27	(4)
(Bulgaria) Georgi Denev	33	(12)
(Bulgaria) Tsvetan Atanasov	21	(3)
(Bulgaria) Stoil Trankov	13	(1)

Forwards
(Bulgaria) Petar Zhekov	31	(29)
(Bulgaria) Stefan Mihaylov	25	(9)
(Bulgaria) Dimitar Marashliev	22	(7)
(Bulgaria) Dimitar Yakimov	1	(0)

Manager
(Bulgaria) Manol Manolov

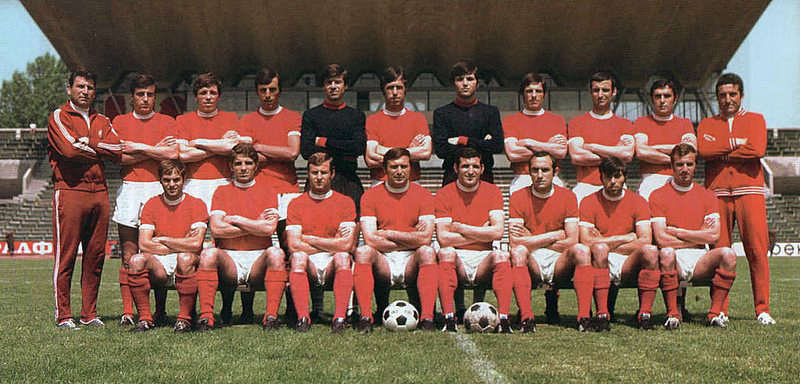
CSKA Sofia in 1973

== Top scorers ==
Rank	Scorer	Club	Goals
1	(Bulgaria) Petar Zhekov	CSKA Sofia	29
2	(Bulgaria) Hristo Bonev	Lokomotiv Plovdiv	28
3	(Bulgaria) Nikola Hristov	Dunav Ruse	23
4	(Bulgaria) Atanas Mihaylov	Lokomotiv Sofia	19
5	(Bulgaria) Georgi Kamenov	Botev Vratsa	18
5	(Bulgaria) Petko Petkov	Beroe	18
7	(Bulgaria) Bozhidar Grigorov	Slavia Sofia	17
8	(Bulgaria) Georgi Tsvetkov	Levski Sofia	16
8	(Bulgaria) Kiril Milanov	Akademik Sofia	16
10	(Bulgaria) Mladen Vasilev	Akademik Sofia	15
