= 1973 Bulgarian Cup final =

- Event: 1972–73 Bulgarian Cup
CSKA Sofia	Beroe Stara Zagora
2	1
- Date: 3 June 1973
- Venue: Vasil Levski National Stadium, Sofia
- Referee: Petar Nikolov (Sofia)
- Attendance: 18,000

The 1973 Bulgarian Cup final was the 33rd final of the Bulgarian Cup (in this period the tournament was named Cup of the Soviet Army), and was contested between CSKA Sofia and Beroe Stara Zagora on 3 June 1973 at Vasil Levski National Stadium in Sofia. CSKA won the final 2–1.

== Match ==
=== Details ===
3 June 1973

CSKA Sofia	2−1	Beroe Stara Zagora
Denev 18'; Zhekov 21'		D. Dimitrov 12'

Vasil Levski National Stadium, Sofia
Attendance: 18,000
Referee: Petar Nikolov (Sofia)

CSKA	Beroe

GK	1	(Bulgaria) Stoyan Yordanov
DF	2	(Bulgaria) Ivan Zafirov
DF	3	(Bulgaria) Bozhil Kolev
DF	4	(Bulgaria) Boris Gaganelov
MF	5	(Bulgaria) Kiril Stankov
DF	6	(Bulgaria) Dimitar Penev (c)
MF	7	(Bulgaria) Tsvetan Atanasov
MF	8	(Bulgaria) Asparuh Nikodimov
FW	9	(Bulgaria) Petar Zhekov
FW	10	(Bulgaria) Georgi Denev
MF	11	(Bulgaria) Plamen Yankov	(substituted off) 71'
Substitutes:
FW	--	(Bulgaria) Borislav Sredkov	(substituted in) 71'
Manager:
(Bulgaria) Manol Manolov

GK	1	(Bulgaria) Todor Krastev
DF	2	(Bulgaria) Nikola Kordov
DF	3	(Bulgaria) Hristo Todorov
DF	4	(Bulgaria) Boris Tasev
MF	5	(Bulgaria) Stefan Ivanov
MF	6	(Bulgaria) Zheko Zhelev
MF	7	(Bulgaria) Boris Kirov
MF	8	(Bulgaria) Evgeni Yanchovski
FW	9	(Bulgaria) Petko Petkov
FW	10	(Bulgaria) Dimitar Dimitrov
MF	11	(Bulgaria) Georgi Belchev (c)
Substitutes:
Manager:
(Bulgaria) Ivan Tanev

== See also ==
- 1972–73 A Group
