= 1971–72 A Group =

28th season of top-tier football league in Bulgaria

A Group
- Season: 1971–72
- Champions: CSKA Sofia (16th title)
- Relegated: Marek; Yantra
- European Cup: CSKA
- UEFA Cup: Levski; Beroe
- Matches played: 306
- Goals scored: 868 (2.84 per match)
- Top goalscorer: Petar Zhekov (27 goals)

The 1971–72 A Group was the 24th season of the A Football Group, the top Bulgarian professional league for association football clubs, since its establishment in 1948.

== Overview ==
It was contested by 18 teams, and CSKA Sofia won the championship.

== League standings ==
| Pos | Team | Pld | W | D | L | GF | GA | GD | Pts | Qualification or relegation |
|---|---|---|---|---|---|---|---|---|---|---|
| 1 | CSKA Sofia (C) | 34 | 26 | 6 | 2 | 95 | 28 | +67 | 58 | Qualification for European Cup first round |
| 2 | Levski Sofia | 34 | 22 | 6 | 6 | 68 | 26 | +42 | 50 | Qualification for UEFA Cup first round |
| 3 | Beroe Stara Zagora | 34 | 18 | 6 | 10 | 61 | 46 | +15 | 42 | Qualification for UEFA Cup first round |
| 4 | Slavia Sofia | 34 | 15 | 9 | 10 | 50 | 43 | +7 | 39 | Qualification for Cup Winners' Cup first round |
| 5 | Lokomotiv Sofia | 34 | 13 | 12 | 9 | 47 | 34 | +13 | 38 | |
| 6 | Botev Plovdiv | 34 | 14 | 7 | 13 | 54 | 47 | +7 | 35 | |
| 7 | Botev Vratsa | 34 | 13 | 5 | 16 | 62 | 64 | −2 | 31 | |
| 8 | Cherno More Varna | 34 | 13 | 5 | 16 | 53 | 60 | −7 | 31 | |
| 9 | Dunav Ruse | 34 | 12 | 7 | 15 | 38 | 50 | −12 | 31 | |
| 10 | Lokomotiv Plovdiv | 34 | 7 | 16 | 11 | 32 | 44 | −12 | 30 | |
| 11 | Akademik Sofia | 34 | 11 | 7 | 16 | 37 | 45 | −8 | 29 | |
| 12 | Etar Veliko Tarnovo | 34 | 11 | 7 | 16 | 39 | 54 | −15 | 29 | |
| 13 | Spartak Pleven | 34 | 11 | 7 | 16 | 40 | 61 | −21 | 29 | |
| 14 | Chernomorets Burgas (Note: 2 points deducted) | 34 | 11 | 8 | 15 | 47 | 49 | −2 | 28 | |
| 15 | Spartak Varna | 34 | 10 | 8 | 16 | 45 | 50 | −5 | 28 | |
| 16 | Tundzha Yambol | 34 | 11 | 6 | 17 | 35 | 50 | −15 | 28 | |
| 17 | Marek Dupnitsa (R) | 34 | 10 | 6 | 18 | 31 | 65 | −34 | 26 | Relegation to 1972–73 B Group |
| 18 | Yantra Gabrovo (Note: 6 points deducted) (R) | 34 | 10 | 8 | 16 | 34 | 52 | −18 | 22 | Relegation to 1972–73 B Group |

Source: rsssf.com
(C) Champions; (R) Relegated

== Results ==
| Home \ Away | AKD | BSZ | BPD | BVR | CHM | CHB | CSK | DUN | ETA | LEV | LPL | LSO | MAR | SLA | SPL | SPV | TUN | YAN |
|---|---|---|---|---|---|---|---|---|---|---|---|---|---|---|---|---|---|---|
| Akademik Sofia | | 3–0 | 0–2 | 2–0 | 1–2 | 3–0 | 2–3 | 2–0 | 0–0 | 1–4 | 0–0 | 1–1 | 1–0 | 0–2 | 1–0 | 2–1 | 2–1 | 2–0 |
| Beroe Stara Zagora | 1–0 | | 1–3 | 2–1 | 3–0 | 2–0 | 2–0 | 4–0 | 2–2 | 1–1 | 2–0 | 1–2 | 6–2 | 2–0 | 4–0 | 4–1 | 1–0 | 3–2 |
| Botev Plovdiv | 1–1 | 2–3 | | 1–0 | 2–0 | 1–2 | 1–1 | 2–1 | 1–0 | 2–1 | 0–2 | 1–2 | 4–0 | 3–4 | 2–0 | 3–1 | 2–1 | 1–1 |
| Botev Vratsa | 4–0 | 2–0 | 3–1 | | 6–2 | 1–0 | 1–2 | 0–0 | 4–0 | 0–3 | 3–0 | 2–1 | 3–3 | 2–1 | 5–1 | 4–3 | 6–1 | 1–1 |
| Cherno More | 2–1 | 0–1 | 1–2 | 4–1 | | 1–1 | 1–2 | 1–1 | 2–1 | 3–1 | 2–1 | 1–0 | 5–1 | 2–1 | 4–1 | 1–1 | 1–1 | 3–0 |
| Chernomorets Burgas | 2–0 | 1–2 | 1–0 | 4–0 | 5–2 | | 1–2 | 4–1 | 0–0 | 2–2 | 2–0 | 4–1 | 2–1 | 0–0 | 4–1 | 1–1 | 2–1 | 2–4 |
| CSKA Sofia | 5–2 | 4–2 | 3–2 | 8–1 | 4–0 | 3–0 | | 4–2 | 4–1 | 0–1 | 2–1 | 1–1 | 6–1 | 0–0 | 6–1 | 3–1 | 5–1 | 5–1 |
| Dunav Ruse | 1–1 | 2–4 | 1–1 | 2–0 | 2–0 | 2–1 | 0–0 | | 4–0 | 1–1 | 4–1 | 1–3 | 1–0 | 1–0 | 1–0 | 2–0 | 1–0 | 1–0 |
| Etar Veliko Tarnovo | 1–0 | 3–0 | 4–3 | 1–0 | 2–1 | 3–1 | 0–4 | 3–2 | | 0–3 | 1–1 | 0–2 | 1–2 | 1–1 | 2–1 | 1–0 | 4–1 | 2–1 |
| Levski Sofia | 1–2 | 4–0 | 2–1 | 2–1 | 3–0 | 1–1 | 0–2 | 3–0 | 1–0 | | 4–0 | 2–0 | 1–0 | 4–0 | 3–1 | 3–0 | 2–0 | 2–1 |
| Lokomotiv Plovdiv | 1–0 | 0–0 | 2–2 | 2–1 | 2–2 | 1–0 | 0–2 | 3–1 | 1–1 | 1–1 | | 0–2 | 3–1 | 0–2 | 0–0 | 1–1 | 1–1 | 4–0 |
| Lokomotiv Sofia | 0–0 | 2–4 | 0–0 | 6–1 | 2–1 | 0–0 | 1–2 | 1–2 | 1–1 | 2–1 | 4–1 | | 4–0 | 0–2 | 2–0 | 0–0 | 0–2 | 3–1 |
| Marek Dupnitsa | 1–0 | 2–1 | 1–2 | 2–1 | 1–0 | 0–0 | 1–1 | 0–0 | 1–0 | 1–2 | 0–0 | 0–0 | | 1–2 | 3–0 | 2–1 | 1–0 | 2–1 |
| Slavia Sofia | 3–2 | 1–1 | 2–1 | 2–3 | 5–2 | 4–1 | 0–6 | 1–0 | 2–1 | 1–1 | 0–0 | 1–1 | 2–0 | | 1–1 | 1–3 | 2–0 | 3–0 |
| Spartak Pleven | 4–2 | 1–1 | 1–0 | 2–2 | 1–0 | 2–1 | 0–1 | 4–0 | 2–1 | 0–3 | 2–2 | 0–0 | 5–0 | 2–1 | | 2–0 | 2–0 | 3–0 |
| Spartak Varna | 1–0 | 0–0 | 1–2 | 3–2 | 1–2 | 5–2 | 0–3 | 2–0 | 3–1 | 0–3 | 0–0 | 1–3 | 4–0 | 0–0 | 6–0 | | 2–0 | 1–0 |
| Tundzha Yambol | 1–1 | 2–0 | 3–2 | 1–0 | 2–0 | 1–0 | 0–1 | 3–1 | 2–1 | 1–2 | 0–0 | 0–0 | 3–1 | 0–2 | 3–0 | 1–1 | | 2–1 |
| Yantra Gabrovo | 0–2 | 3–1 | 1–1 | 1–1 | 1–5 | 1–0 | 0–0 | 1–0 | 1–0 | 1–0 | 1–1 | 0–0 | 3–0 | 2–1 | 0–0 | 1–0 | 3–0 | |

Source: A PFG (in Bulgarian)
Legend: Blue = home team win; Yellow = draw; Red = away team win.

== Champions ==
CSKA Sofia

Goalkeepers
| (Bulgaria) Stoyan Yordanov | 18 | (0) |
| (Bulgaria) Yordan Filipov | 17 | (0) |
| (Bulgaria) Petar Topchev | 1 | (0) |

Defenders
| (Bulgaria) Kiril Stankov | 32 | (0) |
| (Bulgaria) Dimitar Penev | 32 | (1) |
| (Bulgaria) Ivan Zafirov | 31 | (0) |
| (Bulgaria) Todor Simov | 5 | (1) |
| (Bulgaria) Boris Gaganelov | 34 | (0) |
| (Bulgaria) Bozhil Kolev | 29 | (10) |
| (Bulgaria) Iliya Chalev | 1 | (0) |

Midfielders
| (Bulgaria) Borislav Sredkov | 14 | (5) |
| (Bulgaria) Asparuh Nikodimov | 33 | (7) |
| (Bulgaria) Plamen Yankov | 20 | (1) |
| (Bulgaria) Georgi Denev | 29 | (15) |
| (Bulgaria) Tsvetan Atanasov | 28 | (7) |
| (Bulgaria) Stoil Trankov | 14 | (2) |

Forwards
| (Bulgaria) Petar Zhekov | 33 | (27) |
| (Bulgaria) Petar Radkov | 1 | (0) |
| (Bulgaria) Dimitar Marashliev | 30 | (12) |
| (Bulgaria) Totko Dremsizov | 17 | (5) |
| (Bulgaria) Dimitar Yakimov | 9 | (2) |

Manager
| (Bulgaria) Manol Manolov |

== Top scorers ==
| Rank | Scorer | Club | Goals |
|---|---|---|---|
| 1 | (Bulgaria) Petar Zhekov | CSKA Sofia | 27 |
| 2 | (Bulgaria) Petko Petkov | Beroe Stara Zagora | 26 |
| 3 | (Bulgaria) Stefan Bogomilov | Cherno More Varna | 24 |
| 4 | (Bulgaria) Georgi Kamenov | Botev Vratsa | 23 |
| 5 | (Bulgaria) Georgi Tsvetkov | Levski Sofia | 17 |
| 6 | (Bulgaria) Dinko Dermendzhiev | Botev Plovdiv | 16 |
| 7 | (Bulgaria) Georgi Denev | CSKA Sofia | 15 |
| 7 | (Bulgaria) Vasil Mitkov | Levski Sofia | 15 |
| 7 | (Bulgaria) Georgi Lukanov | Etar Veliko Tarnovo | 15 |
| 7 | (Bulgaria) Yordan Yordanov | Tundzha Yambol | 15 |
