= 1970–71 A Group =

27th season of top-tier football league in Bulgaria

A Group
- Season: 1970–71
- Champions: CSKA Sofia (15th title)
- Relegated: Maritsa
- European Cup: CSKA Sofia
- UEFA Cup: Botev Vratsa; Lokomotiv Plovdiv
- Matches played: 240
- Goals scored: 692 (2.88 per match)
- Top goalscorer: Dimitar Yakimov (26 goals)

The 1970–71 A Group was the 23rd season of the A Football Group, the top Bulgarian professional league for association football clubs, since its establishment in 1948.

== Overview ==
It was contested by 16 teams, and CSKA Sofia won the championship.

== League standings ==
Pos	Team	Pld	W	D	L	GF	GA	GD	Pts	Qualification or relegation
1	CSKA Sofia (C)	30	21	6	3	74	21	+53	48	Qualification for European Cup first round
2	Levski Sofia	30	21	6	3	59	22	+37	48	Qualification for Cup Winners' Cup first round
3	Botev Vratsa	30	17	4	9	51	31	+20	38	Qualification for UEFA Cup first round
4	Lokomotiv Plovdiv	30	14	7	9	55	42	+13	35	Qualification for UEFA Cup first round
5	Botev Plovdiv	30	13	6	11	53	50	+3	32	
6	ZhSK-Slavia Sofia	30	12	7	11	53	41	+12	31	
7	Cherno More Varna	30	11	6	13	37	42	−5	28	
8	Yantra Gabrovo	30	11	6	13	42	52	−10	28	
9	Spartak Pleven	30	10	7	13	46	47	−1	27	
10	Marek Dupnitsa	30	9	9	12	37	41	−4	27	
11	Dunav Ruse	30	10	7	13	32	45	−13	27	
12	Etar Veliko Tarnovo	30	10	7	13	33	49	−16	27	
13	Tundzha Yambol	30	8	9	13	26	47	−21	25	
14	Akademik Sofia	30	6	11	13	33	41	−8	23	
15	Chernomorets Burgas	30	6	7	17	33	66	−33	19	
16	Maritsa Plovdiv (R)	30	4	9	17	28	55	−27	17	Relegation to 1971–72 B Group

Source: rsssf.com
(C) Champions; (R) Relegated

== Results ==
Home \ Away	AKD	BPD	BVR	CHM	CHB	CSK	DUN	ETA	LEV	LPL	MAR	MPL	SLA	SPL	TUN	YAN
Akademik Sofia		0–0	0–1	0–1	4–2	0–0	1–1	1–3	1–0	1–1	0–0	3–0	2–4	6–2	2–2	1–0
Botev Plovdiv	3–2		1–0	2–0	5–2	3–6	6–0	3–0	1–0	1–4	1–1	2–1	4–1	1–0	1–2	3–0
Botev Vratsa	2–0	2–1		1–1	8–3	1–1	2–0	4–0	1–2	4–1	2–0	1–0	3–0	3–1	1–0	2–0
Cherno More	0–1	2–1	3–3		1–0	2–2	1–0	2–1	2–1	0–0	1–2	3–0	3–0	1–0	5–1	4–1
Chernomorets Burgas	1–1	2–1	0–2	1–0		1–3	2–0	3–0	1–2	1–3	2–1	2–2	1–1	1–1	3–2	0–1
CSKA Sofia	1–0	5–1	1–0	4–0	5–0		1–0	3–0	0–1	4–1	2–0	4–1	1–0	3–3	5–0	4–0
Dunav Ruse	1–0	0–0	0–2	2–0	2–0	0–3		1–1	0–0	1–0	0–0	4–0	2–0	3–1	2–1	4–1
Etar Veliko Tarnovo	1–1	2–2	2–0	2–1	4–1	0–3	3–0		1–1	0–3	2–1	1–0	3–2	0–1	1–0	0–0
Levski Sofia	3–1	2–1	4–0	3–0	4–2	2–2	2–0	2–0		3–2	4–0	2–0	3–1	1–0	4–0	3–2
Lokomotiv Plovdiv	1–0	2–3	2–1	2–0	2–0	1–1	5–2	4–0	0–0		2–1	2–2	4–3	1–0	7–2	2–4
Marek Dupnitsa	1–1	1–2	2–0	2–2	5–0	0–2	3–1	1–0	1–1	0–1		2–0	1–0	2–0	1–1	4–3
Maritsa Plovdiv	1–1	2–1	3–1	1–1	1–1	1–3	0–0	0–1	1–2	1–1	3–0		1–2	0–3	1–1	2–0
Slavia Sofia	2–1	5–0	1–2	4–1	0–0	1–0	5–1	1–1	1–1	3–0	3–1	1–1		3–0	2–0	2–3
Spartak Pleven	2–2	4–1	1–1	2–0	2–1	0–2	2–3	3–3	1–2	1–0	2–1	4–1	1–1		3–1	5–0
Tundzha Yambol	1–0	0–0	1–0	1–0	0–0	0–2	0–0	2–1	0–2	2–0	1–1	3–2	0–0	2–0		0–0
Yantra Gabrovo	4–0	2–2	0–1	2–0	3–0	2–1	3–2	3–0	0–2	1–1	2–2	3–0	0–4	1–1	1–0	

Source: A PFG (in Bulgarian)
Legend: Blue = home team win; Yellow = draw; Red = away team win.

== Champions ==
CSKA Sofia

Goalkeepers
(Bulgaria) Stoyan Yordanov	21	(0)
(Bulgaria) Yordan Filipov	14	(0)
(Bulgaria) Petar Topchev	2	(0)

Defenders
(Bulgaria) Kiril Stankov	15	(0)
(Bulgaria) Dimitar Penev	30	(2)
(Bulgaria) Ivan Zafirov	29	(1)
(Bulgaria) Ivan Tishanski	8	(0)
(Bulgaria) Boris Gaganelov	22	(0)
(Bulgaria) Bozhil Kolev	24	(1)
(Bulgaria) Iliya Chalev	3	(0)

Midfielders
(Bulgaria) Boris Stankov	5	(0)
(Bulgaria) Asparuh Nikodimov	30	(12)
(Bulgaria) Plamen Yankov	13	(0)
(Bulgaria) Georgi Denev	30	(6)
(Bulgaria) Tsvetan Atanasov	28	(4)

Forwards
(Bulgaria) Petar Zhekov	27	(16)
(Bulgaria) Dimitar Marashliev	28	(4)
(Bulgaria) Vladimir Danchev	9	(0)
(Bulgaria) Dimitar Yakimov	29	(26)

Manager
(Bulgaria) Manol Manolov

== Top scorers ==
Rank	Scorer	Club	Goals
1	(Bulgaria) Dimitar Yakimov	CSKA Sofia	26
2	(Bulgaria) Georgi Kamenov	Botev Vratsa	20
3	(Bulgaria) Hristo Bonev	Lokomotiv Plovdiv	17
4	(Bulgaria) Petar Zhekov	CSKA Sofia	16
5	(Bulgaria) Georgi Vasilev	Lokomotiv Plovdiv	15
5	(Bulgaria) Georgi Georgiev	Chernomorets; ZhSK-Slavia	15
7	(Bulgaria) Yosif Haralampiev	Yantra Gabrovo	14
7	(Bulgaria) Sasho Pargov	Marek Dupnitsa	14
7	(Bulgaria) Totko Dremsizov	Chernomorets Burgas	14
7	(Bulgaria) Stoyan Marinov	Dunav Ruse	14
