= 1965 Bulgarian Cup final =

- Event: 1964–65 Bulgarian Cup
CSKA Sofia	Levski Sofia
3	2
- Date: 8 September 1965
- Venue: Ovcha Kupel Stadium, Sofia
- Referee: Ion Riter (Romania)
- Attendance: 30,000

The 1965 Bulgarian Cup final was the 25th final of the Bulgarian Cup (in this period the tournament was named Cup of the Soviet Army), and was contested between CSKA Sofia and Levski Sofia on 8 September 1965 at Ovcha Kupel Stadium in Sofia. CSKA won the final 3–2.

== Route to the Final ==
CSKA		Round	Levski
Opponent	Result		Opponent	Result
DMZ A. Ivanov Plovdiv	3–1 away	Round of 32	Balkan Botevgrad	4–0 away
Montana	6–0 home; 1–0 away	Round of 16	Tundzha Yambol	0–0 away; 2–1 home
Spartak Sofia	2–1 away; 3–1 home	Quarter-finals	Akademik Sofia	4–1 home; 2–2 away
Lokomotiv Sofia	1–0 away; 0–0 home	Semi-finals	Beroe Stara Zagora	0–0 home; 2–1 away

== Match ==
=== Details ===
8 September 1965

CSKA Sofia	3−2	Levski Sofia
Nikodimov 4'; Tsanev 34'; Kirilov 85' (pen.)		Vasilev 69' (o.g.); Sokolov 77' (pen.)

Ovcha Kupel Stadium, Sofia
Attendance: 30,000
Referee: Ion Riter (Romania)

CSKA	Levski

GK	1	(Bulgaria) Stoyan Yordanov
DF	2	(Bulgaria) Ivan Vasilev
DF	3	(Bulgaria) Boris Gaganelov
DF	4	(Bulgaria) Hristo Marinchev
MF	5	(Bulgaria) Boris Stankov
DF	6	(Bulgaria) Dimitar Penev
FW	7	(Bulgaria) Evden Kamenov	(substituted off) 77'
FW	8	(Bulgaria) Nikola Tsanev (c)
FW	9	(Bulgaria) Dimitar Yakimov
MF	10	(Bulgaria) Yanko Kirilov
MF	11	(Bulgaria) Asparuh Nikodimov
Substitutes:
FW	--	(Bulgaria) Ivan Kolev	(substituted in) 77'
Manager:
(Soviet Union) Grigori Pinaichev

GK	1	(Bulgaria) Biser Mihaylov
DF	2	(Bulgaria) Ivan Zdravkov
DF	3	(Bulgaria) Ivan Vutsov
DF	4	(Bulgaria) Georgi Stoyanov
DF	5	(Bulgaria) Georgi Zlatkov
MF	6	(Bulgaria) Georgi Georgiev
FW	7	(Bulgaria) Simeon Nikolov	(red card) 36'
MF	8	(Bulgaria) Aleksandar Manolov
FW	9	(Bulgaria) Georgi Asparuhov
FW	10	(Bulgaria) Stefan Abadzhiev (c)		(substituted off) 46'
FW	11	(Bulgaria) Aleksandar Kostov
Substitutes:
FW	--	(Bulgaria) Georgi Sokolov		(substituted in) 46'
Manager:
(Czechoslovakia) Rudolf Vytlačil

== See also ==
- 1964–65 A Group
