= 1961–62 A Group =

18th season of top-tier football league in Bulgaria

A Group
- Season: 1961–62
- Champions: CSKA Sofia (12th title)
- Relegated: Minyor; Marek
- European Cup: CSKA Sofia
- Matches: 182
- Goals: 519 (2.85 per match)
- Top goalscorer: Nikola Yordanov (23 goals)

The 1961–62 A Group was the 14th season of the A Football Group, the top Bulgarian professional league for association football clubs, since its establishment in 1948.

== Overview ==
It was contested by 14 teams, and CSKA Sofia won the championship for the ninth straight time.

== League standings ==
Pos	Team	Pld	W	D	L	GF	GA	GD	Pts	Qualification or relegation
1	CSKA Sofia (C)	26	18	5	3	60	25	+35	41	Qualification for European Cup preliminary round
2	Spartak Plovdiv	26	13	9	4	55	35	+20	35	
3	Levski Sofia	26	12	6	8	46	37	+9	30	
4	Botev Plovdiv	26	8	11	7	43	38	+5	27	Qualification for Cup Winners' Cup preliminary round
5	Slavia Sofia	26	10	7	9	45	40	+5	27	
6	Cherno More Varna	26	9	9	8	29	30	−1	27	
7	Lokomotiv Sofia	26	8	10	8	39	39	0	26	
8	Spartak Pleven	26	11	4	11	33	40	−7	26	
9	Beroe Stara Zagora	26	10	5	11	30	40	−10	25	
10	Dunav Ruse	26	8	8	10	40	40	0	24	
11	Spartak Varna	26	7	9	10	33	31	+2	23	
12	Lokomotiv Plovdiv	26	7	7	12	24	35	−11	21	
13	Minyor Pernik (R)	26	4	10	12	18	39	−21	18	Relegation to 1962–63 B Group
14	Marek Dupnitsa (R)	26	5	4	17	24	50	−26	14	Relegation to 1962–63 B Group

Source: rsssf.com
(C) Champions; (R) Relegated

== Results ==
Home \ Away	BSZ	BPD	CHM	CSK	DUN	LEV	LPL	LSO	MAR	MIN	SLA	SPL	SPD	SPV
Beroe Stara Zagora		2–1	1–0	1–1	2–0	0–0	2–0	2–0	1–0	4–0	2–2	2–0	1–0	3–2
Botev Plovdiv	1–0		0–0	1–1	4–0	1–1	0–1	1–1	2–1	4–2	2–0	1–3	1–1	3–1
Cherno More	3–0	1–1		0–2	1–0	1–2	2–1	2–2	3–0	1–0	2–1	2–0	0–0	0–0
CSKA Sofia	3–0	3–1	1–0		1–0	1–1	2–1	5–1	3–1	3–0	2–0	7–1	4–1	0–1
Dunav Ruse	4–1	2–2	4–2	2–2		1–2	1–0	1–0	4–1	1–2	2–3	5–1	1–1	2–2
Levski Sofia	2–2	1–6	6–0	6–3	4–0		4–1	1–0	0–1	1–0	2–1	3–2	3–3	1–0
Lokomotiv Plovdiv	1–0	1–2	1–1	1–3	1–1	2–0		2–0	2–0	0–0	1–1	1–0	0–0	3–1
Lokomotiv Sofia	3–0	3–0	2–2	1–1	1–1	1–0	1–1		6–1	1–0	3–1	2–1	4–4	2–0
Marek Dupnitsa	1–0	2–2	0–1	0–2	0–1	3–0	3–2	3–1		2–2	1–1	1–2	1–2	0–0
Minyor Pernik	3–2	1–1	0–0	1–3	1–1	0–1	1–1	0–0	2–0		1–0	1–1	0–1	0–0
Slavia Sofia	6–1	2–1	1–0	1–2	1–3	3–3	1–0	3–1	4–1	4–1		5–1	0–0	1–0
Spartak Pleven	0–0	3–0	2–0	1–3	1–0	2–1	4–0	0–0	1–0	1–0	1–1		1–0	1–0
Spartak Plovdiv	2–1	4–4	2–4	2–0	4–3	1–0	4–0	4–0	3–0	6–0	1–1	4–3		4–3
Spartak Varna	5–0	1–1	1–1	0–2	0–0	2–1	1–0	3–3	3–1	0–0	6–1	1–0	0–1	

Source: A PFG (in Bulgarian)
Legend: Blue = home team win; Yellow = draw; Red = away team win.

== Champions ==
CSKA Sofia

Goalkeepers
(Bulgaria) Georgi Naydenov	21	(0)
(Bulgaria) Hristo Andonov	4	(0)
(Bulgaria) Petar Petrov	4	(0)

Defenders
(Bulgaria) Nikola Kovachev	25	(4)
(Bulgaria) Stoyan Koshev	10	(0)
(Bulgaria) Ivan Zdravkov	3	(0)
(Bulgaria) Kiril Rakarov	20	(2)
(Bulgaria) Manol Manolov	10	(0)
(Bulgaria) Boris Gaganelov	23	(0)

Midfielders
(Bulgaria) Boris Stankov	8	(1)
(Bulgaria) Georgi Zlatkov	10	(1)
(Bulgaria) Panteley Dimitrov	26	(2)
(Bulgaria) Vasil Romanov	10	(2)
(Bulgaria) Georgi Georgiev	4	(0)

Forwards
(Bulgaria) Ivan Kolev	26	(6)
(Bulgaria) Ivan Rankov	23	(7)
(Bulgaria) Nikola Tsanev	22	(13)
(Bulgaria) Hristo Dzhordzhilov	1	(1)
(Bulgaria) Dimitar Yakimov	25	(15)
(Bulgaria) Panayot Panayotov	24	(2)
(Bulgaria) Anton Krastev	8	(3)

Manager
(Bulgaria) Krum Milev

== Top scorers ==
Rank	Scorer	Club	Goals
1	(Bulgaria) Nikola Yordanov	Dunav Ruse	23
2	(Bulgaria) Todor Diev	Spartak Plovdiv	19
2	(Bulgaria) Aleksandar Vasilev	Slavia Sofia	19
4	(Bulgaria) Hristo Dishkov	Spartak Plovdiv	16
5	(Bulgaria) Dimitar Yakimov	CSKA Sofia	15
