= 1969–70 A Group =

26th season of top-tier football league in Bulgaria

A Group
- Season: 1969–70
- Champions: Levski Sofia (11th title)
- Relegated: Minyor; Beroe
- European Cup: Levski
- Inter-Cities Fairs Cup: Slavia; Botev Plovdiv
- Matches played: 240
- Goals scored: 647 (2.7 per match)
- Top goalscorer: Petar Zhekov (31 goals)

The 1969–70 A Group was the 22nd season of the A Football Group, the top Bulgarian professional league for association football clubs, since its establishment in 1948.

== Overview ==
It was contested by 16 teams, and Levski Sofia won the championship.

== League standings ==
| Pos | Team | Pld | W | D | L | GF | GA | GD | Pts | Qualification or relegation |
|---|---|---|---|---|---|---|---|---|---|---|
| 1 | Levski Sofia (C) | 30 | 23 | 4 | 3 | 67 | 17 | +50 | 50 | Qualification for European Cup preliminary round |
| 2 | CSKA Sofia | 30 | 21 | 5 | 4 | 73 | 29 | +44 | 47 | Qualification for Cup Winners' Cup first round |
| 3 | Slavia Sofia | 30 | 15 | 8 | 7 | 41 | 31 | +10 | 38 | Invitation for Inter-Cities Fairs Cup first round |
| 4 | Botev Plovdiv | 30 | 15 | 4 | 11 | 48 | 34 | +14 | 34 | Invitation for Inter-Cities Fairs Cup first round |
| 5 | Lokomotiv Plovdiv | 30 | 14 | 5 | 11 | 53 | 45 | +8 | 33 | |
| 6 | Etar Veliko Tarnovo | 30 | 12 | 8 | 10 | 42 | 36 | +6 | 32 | |
| 7 | Cherno More Varna | 30 | 11 | 7 | 12 | 47 | 34 | +13 | 29 | |
| 8 | Chernomorets Burgas | 30 | 10 | 9 | 11 | 33 | 41 | −8 | 29 | |
| 9 | Akademik Sofia | 30 | 9 | 10 | 11 | 34 | 32 | +2 | 28 | |
| 10 | Dunav Ruse | 30 | 9 | 9 | 12 | 28 | 34 | −6 | 27 | |
| 11 | Marek Dupnitsa | 30 | 12 | 3 | 15 | 41 | 49 | −8 | 27 | |
| 12 | Spartak Pleven | 30 | 10 | 7 | 13 | 29 | 53 | −24 | 27 | |
| 13 | Botev Vratsa | 30 | 9 | 7 | 14 | 34 | 38 | −4 | 25 | |
| 14 | Maritsa Plovdiv | 30 | 10 | 3 | 17 | 34 | 51 | −17 | 23 | |
| 15 | Beroe Stara Zagora (R) | 30 | 6 | 4 | 20 | 19 | 64 | −45 | 16 | Relegation to 1970–71 B Group |
| 16 | Minyor Pernik (R) | 30 | 5 | 5 | 20 | 24 | 59 | −35 | 15 | Relegation to 1970–71 B Group |

Source: rsssf.com
(C) Champions; (R) Relegated

== Results ==
| Home \ Away | AKD | BSZ | BPD | BVR | CHM | CHB | CSK | DUN | ETA | LEV | LPL | MAR | MPL | MIN | SLA | SPL |
|---|---|---|---|---|---|---|---|---|---|---|---|---|---|---|---|---|
| Akademik Sofia | | 2–0 | 1–2 | 1–1 | 1–1 | 1–1 | 0–1 | 0–0 | 1–1 | 0–2 | 3–1 | 2–0 | 2–1 | 1–0 | 1–2 | 2–2 |
| Beroe Stara Zagora | 0–3 (Note: As a result of the crowd riots in the match between Beroe Stara Zagora and Levski Sofia, the remaining twelve encounters were rated 0–3 against Beroe.) | | 0–1 | 2–1 | 1–0 | 0–3 | 0–3 | 1–0 | 2–1 | 1–1 | 0–3 | 3–1 | 0–3 | 2–2 | 0–3 | 2–1 |
| Botev Plovdiv | 2–1 | 3–0 | | 2–0 | 3–0 | 2–0 | 0–1 | 1–0 | 1–1 | 0–1 | 0–1 | 3–2 | 1–2 | 2–1 | 3–0 | 5–0 |
| Botev Vratsa | 1–1 | 3–0 | 3–1 | | 0–0 | 3–1 | 0–0 | 1–0 | 0–1 | 0–1 | 1–0 | 4–2 | 3–1 | 3–0 | 1–2 | 4–1 |
| Cherno More | 2–1 | 3–1 | 0–1 | 4–0 | | 2–0 | 0–1 | 0–0 | 3–1 | 0–1 | 2–0 | 4–0 | 6–1 | 3–0 | 4–0 | 3–0 |
| Chernomorets Burgas | 0–1 | 1–1 | 1–1 | 1–0 | 1–1 | | 2–1 | 1–0 | 1–0 | 1–1 | 3–2 | 1–0 | 0–2 | 2–0 | 0–0 | 4–1 |
| CSKA Sofia | 0–1 | 1–0 | 1–1 | 1–1 | 3–1 | 5–1 | | 4–1 | 3–2 | 4–2 | 6–1 | 2–1 | 6–1 | 2–1 | 2–0 | 7–0 |
| Dunav Ruse | 1–0 | 3–0 | 1–0 | 3–2 | 1–1 | 1–1 | 0–2 | | 1–0 | 1–0 | 1–0 | 0–1 | 3–1 | 4–1 | 1–2 | 1–1 |
| Etar Veliko Tarnovo | 1–1 | 3–0 | 2–1 | 1–0 | 3–0 | 2–1 | 3–2 | 1–1 | | 0–2 | 2–2 | 5–1 | 1–0 | 1–0 | 0–0 | 2–1 |
| Levski Sofia | 2–1 | 4–0 | 2–1 | 4–0 | 4–1 | 4–0 | 5–2 | 3–0 | 2–2 | | 1–0 | 4–0 | 1–0 | 6–0 | 0–1 | 1–0 |
| Lokomotiv Plovdiv | 2–1 | 4–0 | 1–3 | 1–0 | 1–1 | 4–1 | 3–3 | 4–1 | 2–0 | 1–3 | | 5–2 | 1–0 | 4–0 | 1–2 | 0–0 |
| Marek Dupnitsa | 2–1 | 3–0 | 3–2 | 2–0 | 2–1 | 2–1 | 0–0 | 0–0 | 1–0 | 0–1 | 0–1 | | 2–0 | 1–0 | 0–0 | 8–0 |
| Maritsa Plovdiv | 1–1 | 1–0 | 1–3 | 2–0 | 3–2 | 2–2 | 2–4 | 1–1 | 2–1 | 0–1 | 1–2 | 1–2 | | 2–0 | 1–0 | 2–0 |
| Minyor Pernik | 1–0 | 2–1 | 1–1 | 1–1 | 1–0 | 0–1 | 0–3 | 1–1 | 2–2 | 0–5 | 3–4 | 3–0 | 2–0 | | 1–2 | 0–2 |
| Slavia Sofia | 2–3 | 2–2 | 5–1 | 1–0 | 1–1 | 1–1 | 0–1 | 2–0 | 2–3 | 1–1 | 3–0 | 3–2 | 1–0 | 2–1 | | 1–0 |
| Spartak Pleven | 0–0 | 3–0 | 2–1 | 1–1 | 2–1 | 1–0 | 0–2 | 2–1 | 1–0 | 0–2 | 2–2 | 2–1 | 3–0 | 1–0 | 0–0 | |

Source: A PFG (in Bulgarian)
Legend: Blue = home team win; Yellow = draw; Red = away team win.

== Champions ==
Levski Sofia

Goalkeepers
| (Bulgaria) Georgi Kamenski | 23 | (0) |
| (Bulgaria) Biser Mihaylov | 8 | (0) |

Defenders
| (Bulgaria) Ivan Zdravkov | 1 | (0) |
| (Bulgaria) Kiril Ivkov | 27 | (0) |
| (Bulgaria) Georgi Todorov | 5 | (0) |
| (Bulgaria) Dobromir Zhechev | 23 | (2) |
| (Bulgaria) Stefan Aladzhov | 29 | (0) |
| (Bulgaria) Stoichko Peshev | 17 | (2) |
| (Bulgaria) Milko Gaydarski | 27 | (0) |

Midfielders
| (Bulgaria) Stefan Pavlov | 19 | (1) |
| (Bulgaria) Petar Kirilov | 14 | (1) |
| (Bulgaria) Yanko Kirilov | 29 | (4) |
| (Bulgaria) Tsvetan Veselinov | 18 | (10) |
| (Bulgaria) Ivan Stoyanov | 11 | (0) |
| (Bulgaria) Vasil Mitkov | 26 | (12) |

Forwards
| (Bulgaria) Nikola Kotkov | 24 | (14) |
| (Bulgaria) Pavel Panov | 23 | (8) |
| (Bulgaria) Georgi Asparuhov | 24 | (12) |
| (Bulgaria) Aleksandar Kostov | 19 | (1) |
| (Bulgaria) Slavcho Stoilov | 2 | (0) |

Manager
| (Czechoslovakia) Rudolf Vytlačil |

== Top scorers ==
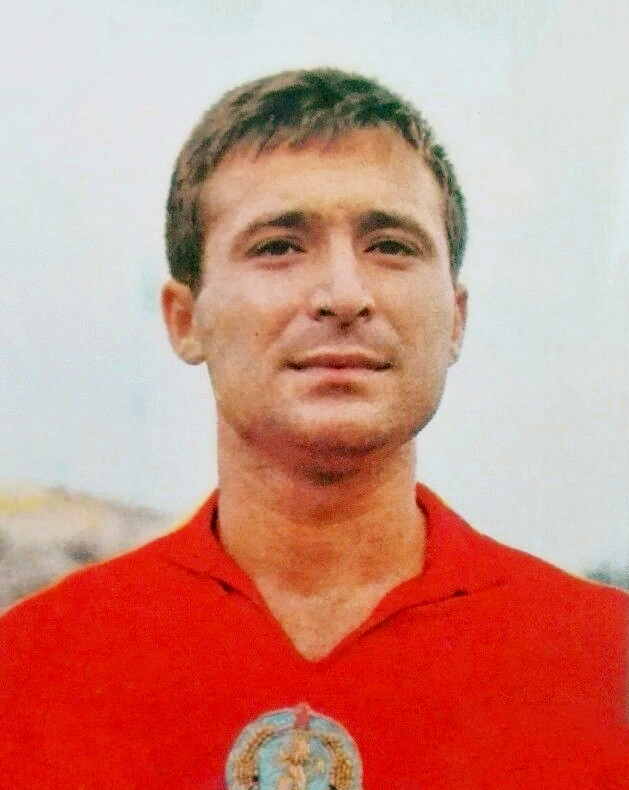
Petar Zhekov - top scorer of the 1969–70 season

| Rank | Scorer | Club | Goals |
|---|---|---|---|
| 1 | (Bulgaria) Petar Zhekov | CSKA Sofia | 31 |
| 2 | (Bulgaria) Hristo Bonev | Lokomotiv Plovdiv | 20 |
| 3 | (Bulgaria) Dinko Dermendzhiev | Botev Plovdiv | 18 |
| 3 | (Bulgaria) Stefan Bogomilov | Cherno More Varna | 18 |
| 5 | (Bulgaria) Dimitar Tsekov | Etar Veliko Tarnovo | 16 |
| 6 | (Bulgaria) Dimitar Yakimov | CSKA Sofia | 14 |
| 6 | (Bulgaria) Nikola Kotkov | Levski Sofia | 14 |
| 8 | (Bulgaria) Georgi Asparuhov | Levski Sofia | 12 |
| 8 | (Bulgaria) Vasil Mitkov | Levski Sofia | 12 |
| 10 | (Bulgaria) Georgi Lukanov | Lokomotiv Plovdiv | 11 |
| 10 | (Bulgaria) Mladen Vasilev | Akademik Sofia | 11 |
| 10 | (Bulgaria) Kiril Milanov | Marek Dupnitsa | 11 |
| 10 | (Bulgaria) Georgi Kamenov | Botev Vratsa | 11 |
