= 1962 Bulgarian Cup final =

- Event: 1961–62 Bulgarian Cup
| Botev Plovdiv | Dunav Ruse |
| 3 | 0 |
- Date: 12 August 1962
- Venue: Vasil Levski National Stadium, Sofia
- Referee: Kostadin Dinov (Sofia)
- Attendance: 20,000

The 1962 Bulgarian Cup final was the 22nd final of the Bulgarian Cup (in this period the tournament was named Cup of the Soviet Army), and was contested between Botev Plovdiv and Dunav Ruse on 12 August 1962 at Vasil Levski National Stadium in Sofia. Botev won the final 3–0.

== Match ==
=== Details ===
12 August 1962

| Botev Plovdiv | 3−0 | Dunav Ruse |
|---|---|---|
| Dermendzhiev 33'; Haralampiev 53'; Chakarov 76' |

Vasil Levski National Stadium, Sofia
Attendance: 20,000
Referee: Kostadin Dinov (Sofia)

| Botev | Dunav |

| GK | 1 | (Bulgaria) Mihail Karushkov | (substituted off) 83' |
| DF | 2 | (Bulgaria) Rayno Panayotov |
| DF | 3 | (Bulgaria) Georgi Chakarov (c) |
| DF | 4 | (Bulgaria) Vidin Apostolov |
| DF | 5 | (Bulgaria) Ivan Zanev |
| MF | 6 | (Bulgaria) Rayko Stoynev |
| MF | 7 | (Bulgaria) Dinko Dermendzhiev |
| FW | 8 | (Bulgaria) Georgi Asparuhov |
| FW | 9 | (Bulgaria) Ivan Sotirov |
| MF | 10 | (Bulgaria) Georgi Haralampiev |
| FW | 11 | (Bulgaria) Georgi Popov | (substituted off) 73' |
Substitutes:
| GK | 12 | (Bulgaria) Georgi Naydenov | (substituted in) 83' |
| MF | -- | (Bulgaria) Stoichko Peshev | (substituted in) 73' |
Manager:
(Bulgaria) Georgi Genov

| GK | 1 | (Bulgaria) Sava Simeonov |
| DF | 2 | (Bulgaria) Dobri Dobchev |
| DF | 3 | (Bulgaria) Ivan Minchev |
| DF | 4 | (Bulgaria) Petar Penev |
| DF | 5 | (Bulgaria) Dimitar Bozhidarov |
| MF | 6 | (Bulgaria) Svetoslav Kirchev |
| FW | 7 | (Bulgaria) Lyubomir Malinov |
| MF | 8 | (Bulgaria) Petar Florov | (substituted off) 46' |
| FW | 9 | (Bulgaria) Nikola Yordanov (c) |
| MF | 10 | (Bulgaria) Vasil Razsolkov |
| FW | 11 | (Bulgaria) Remzi Nuriev |
Substitutes:
| MF | -- | (Bulgaria) Georgi Dimov | (substituted in) 46' |
Manager:
(Bulgaria) Dimitar Mutafchiev

== See also ==
- 1961–62 A Group
