= Yanko Kirilov =

Bulgarian footballer

Personal information
- Date of birth: 10 March 1946 (age 80)
- Place of birth: Sofia, Bulgaria
- Position: Midfielder

Senior career*
Years	Team	Apps	(Gls)
1961–1963	Levski Sofia	17	(1)
1963–1966	CSKA Sofia	36	(12)
1966–1972	Levski Sofia	142	(34)
1972–1975	Chernomorets Burgas		
1975–1978	Levski Sofia	2	(0)

International career
1967–1971	Bulgaria	4	(1)
- * Club domestic league appearances and goals

Yanko Kirilov (Bulgarian: Янко Кирилов; born 10 March 1946) is a former Bulgarian footballer who played as a midfielder.

== Career ==
A product of Levski Sofia's youth system, Kirilov made his A Group debut on 18 November 1961 against Minyor Pernik to become the Levski's youngest ever player in the league at the age of 15 years, 8 months and 8 days old.

In 1963, Kirilov joined CSKA Sofia. On 8 September 1965, he scored late winner goal from the penalty spot in CSKA's 3–2 defeat of Levski in the 1965 Bulgarian Cup Final. Kirilov collected his first A Group title winner's medal at the end of the 1965–66 season. He scored 6 league goals in 12 matches that season.

In June 1966, Krumov returned to Levski Sofia where he won two A Group titles and three Bulgarian Cups in the following six seasons. In 1972, he joined Chernomorets Burgas where he spent three seasons, before retiring as a Levski's player at the age of 32 in 1978.

== Honours ==
=== Club ===
CSKA Sofia

- A Group: 1965–66
- Bulgarian Cup: 1965

Levski Sofia

- A Group (2): 1967–68, 1969–70
- Bulgarian Cup (3): 1967, 1970, 1971
