= Dimitar Marashliev =

Bulgarian footballer

Personal information
- Full name: Dimitar Hristov Marashliev
- Date of birth: 31 August 1947
- Place of birth: Harmanli, Bulgaria
- Date of death: 12 July 2018 (aged 70)
- Place of death: Sofia, Bulgaria
- Positions: Winger; forward

Youth career
- 1960–1963: Hebros Harmanli

Senior career*
Years	Team	Apps	(Gls)
1963–1966	Maritsa Plovdiv		
1966	Spartak Plovdiv	6	(2)
1966–1976	CSKA Sofia	244	(73)
1976–1977	Cherno More	19	(8)

International career
1969–1970	Bulgaria	8	(3)
- * Club domestic league appearances and goals

Dimitar Hristov Marashliev (Bulgarian: Димитьр Xристов Марашлиeв; 31 August 1947 – 12 July 2018) was a Bulgarian football forward who played for Bulgaria in the 1970 FIFA World Cup. He also played for CSKA Sofia.

== Career ==
Born in Harmanli, Marashliev began his football career playing for hometown club Hebros at the age of 13. He spent three years at the club before moving to Maritsa Plovdiv in 1963. Three years later, Marashliev made his A Group debut with Spartak Plovdiv, appearing in 6 league matches and scoring 2 times.

In October 1966, Marashliev joined CSKA Sofia. In his ten years at the club, he won six A Group titles and four Bulgarian Cups. Marashliev scored a total of 4 goals in three Bulgarian Cup finals – in 1969 (one goal against Levski Sofia), 1972 (two goals against Slavia Sofia) and 1974 (one goal against Levski Sofia).

After leaving CSKA at the end of the 1975–76 season, Marashliev joined Cherno More Varna, scoring 8 goals in the B Group. He retired from competitive football at the end of the 1976–77 season, at the age of 30.

== Honours ==
=== Club ===
CSKA Sofia

- A Group (6): 1968–69, 1970–71, 1971–72, 1972–73, 1974–75, 1975–76
- Bulgarian Cup (4): 1969, 1972, 1973, 1974
