= Stancho Bonchev =

Bulgarian footballer

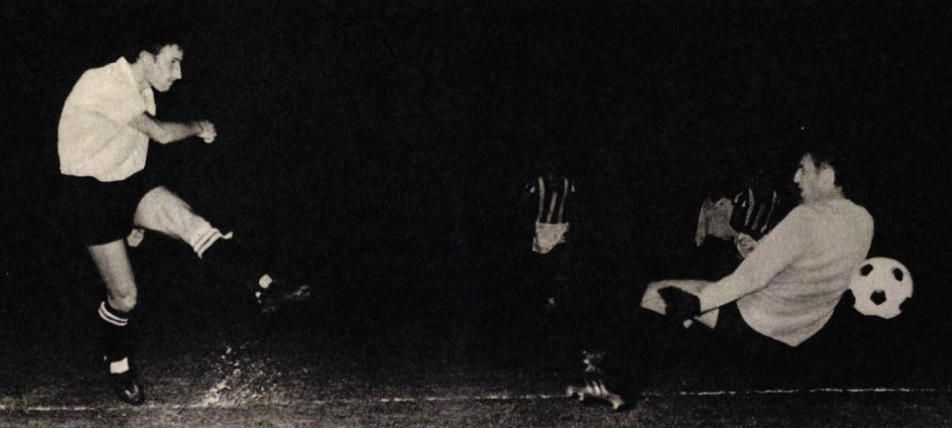
- Bonchev (right) playing for Lokomotiv Plovdiv against Juventus in 1969

Personal information
- Full name: Stancho Vasilev Bonchev
- Date of birth: 1 May 1942
- Place of birth: Medovnica, Bulgaria
- Date of death: 12 October 2013 (aged 71)
- Place of death: Plovdiv, Bulgaria
- Position: Goalkeeper

Senior career*
Years	Team	Apps	(Gls)
1957–1960	Benkovski Vidin		
1960–1962	Sliven		
1962–1967	Lokomotiv Plovdiv	112	(0)
1967–1969	CSKA Sofia	28	(0)
1969–1980	Lokomotiv Plovdiv	219	(0)

International career
1965–1968	Bulgaria	7	(0)
- * Club domestic league appearances and goals

Stancho Vasilev Bonchev (Bulgarian: Станчо Василев Бончев) (1 May 1942-2013) was a Bulgarian football goalkeeper. He is legendary player of Lokomotiv Plovdiv and holds the record for the goalkeeper with the most First League appearances - 359 in total (331 league appearances for Lokomotiv Plovdiv and 28 for CSKA Sofia). Stancho Bonchev is also "best footballer of Plovdiv" for 1965 and "Master of Sports" since 1978.

Bonchev played for the Bulgaria national football team in the UEFA Euro 1968 qualifying rounds.

== Honours ==
CSKA Sofia

- Champion of Bulgaria: 1968-69
- Bulgarian Cup Winner: 1968-69
