= Viktor Yonov =

Bulgarian footballer

Personal information
- Date of birth: 5 September 1946 (age 80)
- Position: Midfielder

Senior career*
Years	Team	Apps	(Gls)
1968–1974	Slavia Sofia		

International career
1971–1973	Bulgaria	7	(0)
- * Club domestic league appearances and goals

Viktor Yonov (Bulgarian: Виктор Йонов, born 5 September 1946) is a retired Bulgarian football midfielder.
