= Bozhil Kolev =

Bulgarian footballer and manager

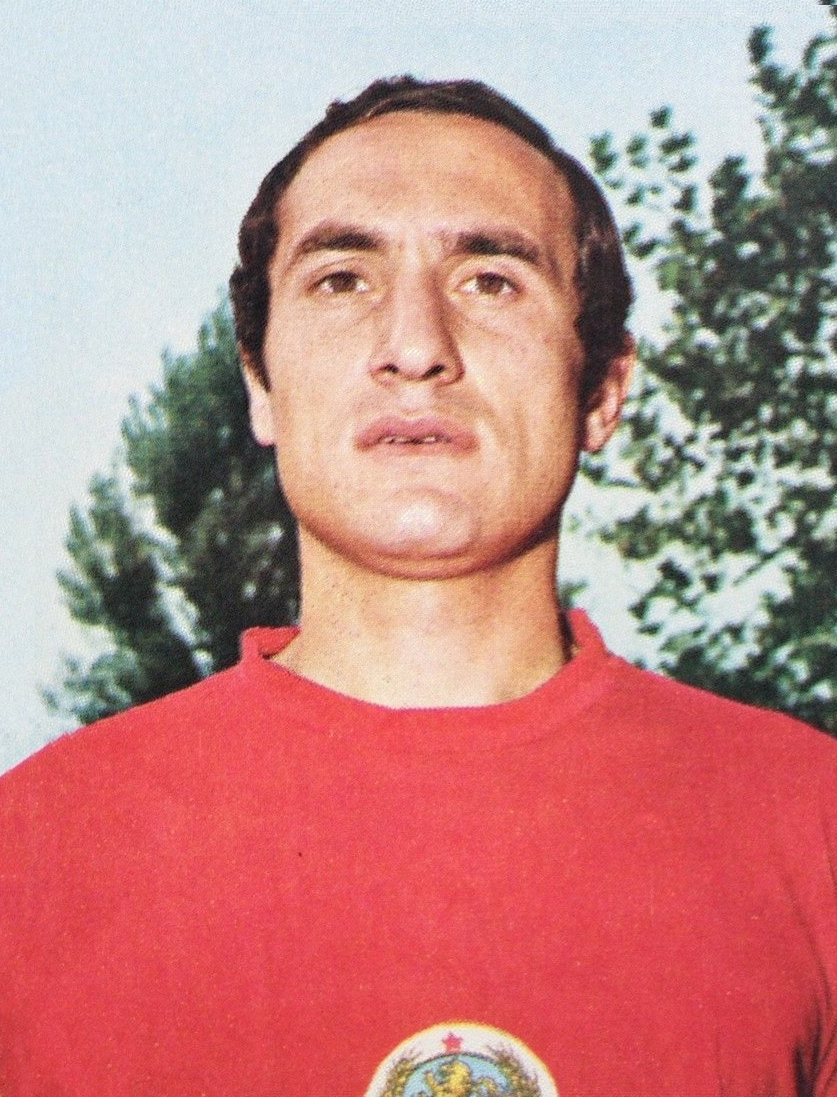

Personal information
- Full name: Bozhil Naydenov Kolev
- Date of birth: 20 May 1949 (age 77)
- Place of birth: Tsonevo, Bulgaria
- Position: Defender

Youth career
- 1959–1967: Cherno More

Senior career*
Years	Team	Apps	(Gls)
1967–1970	Cherno More	86	(3)
1970–1979	CSKA Sofia	254	(63)
1979–1981	Cherno More	33	(8)
1981–1982	Omonia	4	(0)
Total		377	(74)

International career
1969–1980	Bulgaria	60	(8)

Managerial career
- 1986–1989: Cherno More
- 1989–1990: Omonia
- 1990–1991: Nea Salamis
- 1992–1994: Cherno More
- 1994: CSKA Sofia
- 1996–1997: Avtotreyd Aksakovo
- 1997–1998: Bulgaria (assistant)
- 2000–2001: Cherno More
- * Club domestic league appearances and goals

Bozhil Naydenov Kolev (Bulgarian: Божил Найденов Колев; born 20 May 1949) is a former Bulgarian football player and manager.

Kolev made 60 appearances for the Bulgaria national team from 1969 to 1978.

== Club career ==
Born in Tsonevo, Dalgopol Municipality, Varna Province, Kolev joined Cherno More Varna at the age of ten and progressed through the club's youth system. He made his professional debut on 13 August 1967, scoring a goal in a 3–2 home loss against CSKA Sofia at Yuri Gagarin Stadium.

In 1972, after spending over eleven years at Cherno More, Kolev joined CSKA Sofia, where he won four A Group titles and three Bulgarian Cups.

== Honours ==
CSKA Sofia

- A Group (5): 1970–71, 1971–72, 1972–73, 1974–75, 1975–76
- Bulgarian Cup (3): 1972, 1973, 1974

AC Omonia

- Cypriot First Division: 1981–82
- Cypriot Cup: 1981–82
