= Tsvetan Veselinov =

Bulgarian footballer (1947–2018)

Personal information
- Full name: Tsvetan Veselinov Dimitrov
- Date of birth: 27 April 1947
- Place of birth: Sofia, Bulgaria
- Date of death: 26 February 2018 (aged 70)
- Position: Winger

Youth career
- 1957–1965: Levski Sofia

Senior career*
Years	Team	Apps	(Gls)
1965–1975	Levski Sofia	193	(70)

International career
1968–1971	Bulgaria	6	(2)

Managerial career
- 1975–1980: Levski Sofia (youth team)
- 1987–1989: US Sbeitla
- * Club domestic league appearances and goals

Olympic medal record

Men's Football
Silver medal – second place	1968 Mexico City	Team competition

Tsvetan Veselinov (Bulgarian: Цветан Веселинов; 27 April 1947 in Sofia – 26 February 2018) was a Bulgarian footballer who played as a midfielder. He spent all 10 seasons of his career in the A Group with Levski Sofia, before retiring at the age of 28 in 1975.

With the Bulgarian national team he won a silver medal at the 1968 Summer Olympics. Veselinov netted Bulgaria's only goal in the final against Hungary, a 4–1 defeat at Estadio Azteca on 26 October 1968.

His death was announced on 26 February 2018. He was 70.

== Honours ==
=== Club ===
Levski Sofia

- Bulgarian A Group (3): 1967–68, 1969–70, 1973–74
- Bulgarian Cup (3): 1967, 1970, 1971

== See also ==
- List of one-club men in association football
