= Georgi Denev =

Bulgarian footballer and manager

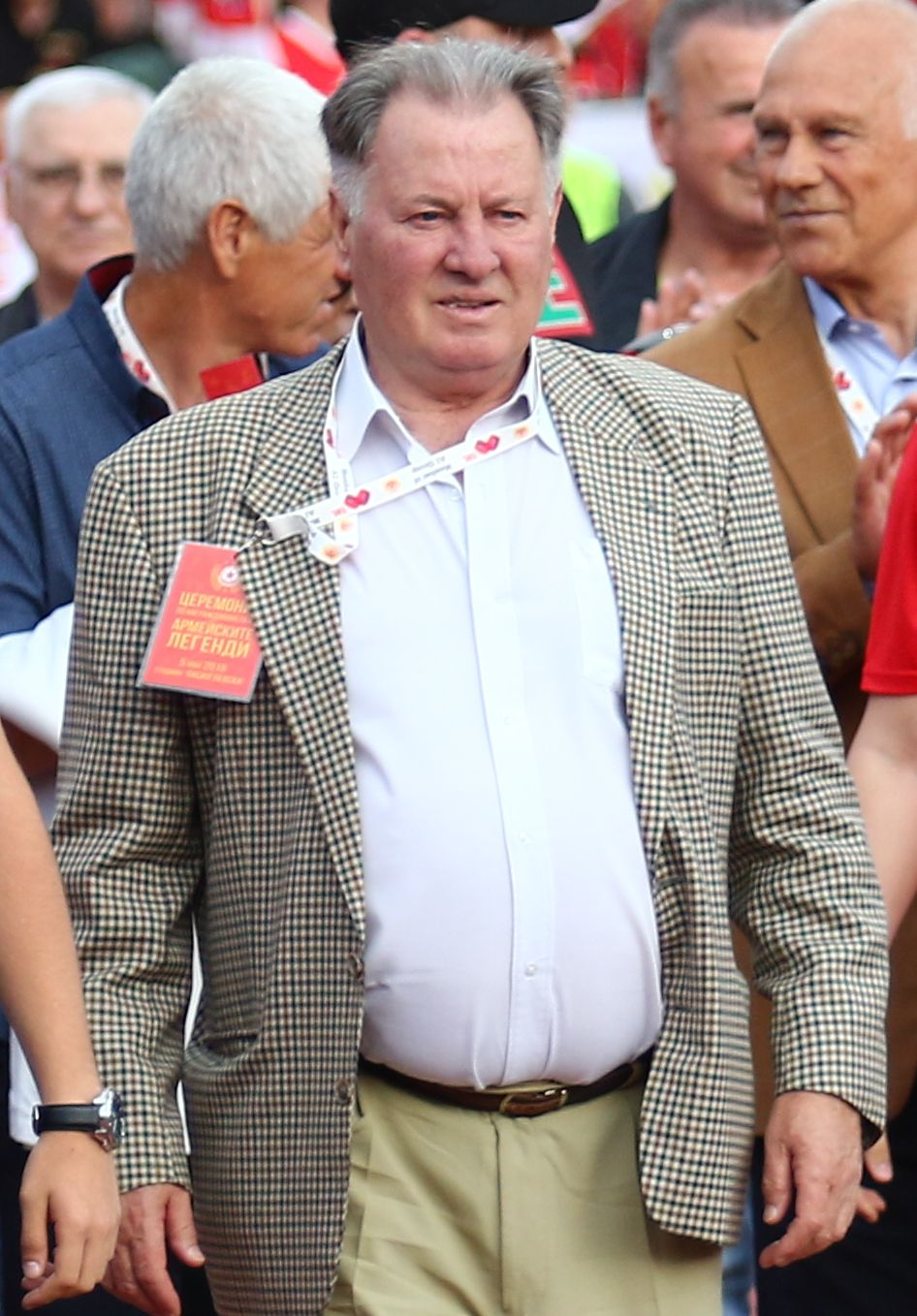
- Georgi Denev in 2018

Personal information
- Full name: Georgi Nikolov Denev
- Date of birth: 18 April 1950 (age 76)
- Place of birth: Lovech, Bulgaria
- Height: 1.82 m (5 ft 11 1/2 in)
- Position: Winger

Senior career*
| Years | Team | Apps | (Gls) |
| 1965–1968 | Karpachev Lovech | | |
| 1968–1969 | Spartak Pleven | 28 | (7) |
| 1969–1979 | CSKA Sofia | 227 | (68) |
| 1979–1981 | Ethnikos Piraeus | 42 | (18) |
| 1981–1983 | Aris Limassol | 47 | (16) |

International career
| 1970–1978 | Bulgaria | 49 | (10) |

Managerial career
- 1990–1991: Slanchev Bryag
- 1992–1993: Aris Limassol
- 1995–1996: Lovech
- * Club domestic league appearances and goals

Georgi Nikolov Denev (Bulgarian: Георги Никoлoв Денев; born 18 April 1950) is a former Bulgarian football player and manager. Denev made 49 appearances and scored 10 goals for the Bulgaria national football team from 1970 to 1979. He also played at the 1974 FIFA World Cup.

== Honours ==
=== CSKA Sofia ===
- Bulgarian A Group (5): 1970–71, 1971–72, 1972–73, 1974–75, 1975–76
- Bulgarian Cup (3): 1972, 1973, 1974
