= Georgi Kamenski =

Bulgarian footballer

Personal information
- Date of birth: 3 February 1947 (age 79)
- Place of birth: Sofia, Bulgaria
- Position: Goalkeeper

Youth career
- 1955–1964: Levski Sofia

Senior career*
Years	Team	Apps	(Gls)
1964–1972	Levski Sofia	87	(0)

International career
- Bulgaria
- * Club domestic league appearances and goals

Georgi Kamenski (Bulgarian: Георги Каменски; born 3 February 1947) is a Bulgarian former football goalkeeper who played for Bulgaria in the 1970 FIFA World Cup. He also played for Levski Sofia.

== Honours ==
=== Club ===
Levski Sofia

- Bulgarian League (3): 1964–65, 1967–68, 1969–70
- Bulgarian Cup (2): 1969–70, 1970–71

== See also ==
- List of one-club men in association football
