= Dimitar Penev =

Bulgarian footballer (1945–2026)

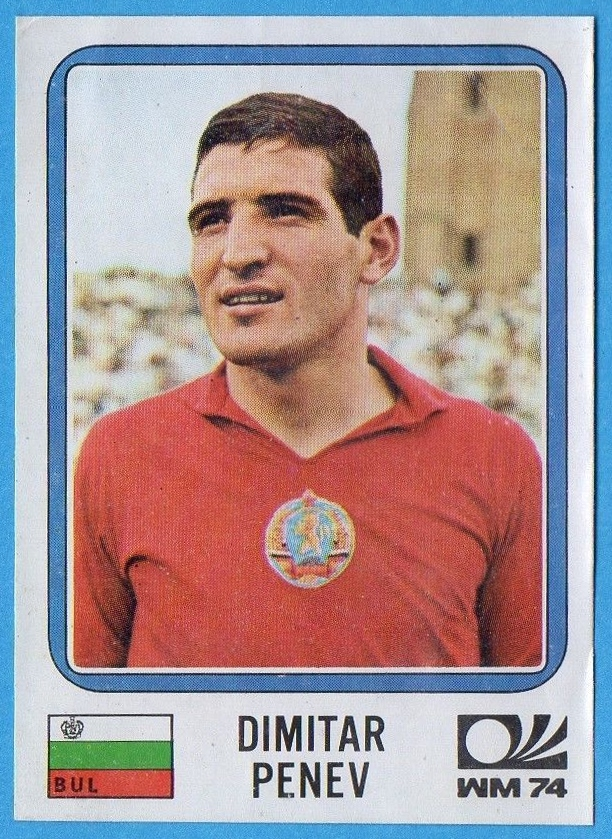
- Penev with Bulgaria

Personal information
- Full name: Dimitar Dushkov Penev
- Date of birth: 12 July 1945
- Place of birth: Mirovyane, Bulgaria
- Date of death: 3 January 2026 (aged 80)
- Position: Central defender

Senior career*
Years	Team	Apps	(Gls)
1962–1964	Lokomotiv Sofia	35	(1)
1964–1977	CSKA Sofia	329	(24)
Total		364	(25)

International career
1964–1977	Bulgaria	90	(2)

Managerial career
- 1977–1979: Dimitrovgrad
- 1983–1985: Al-Yarmouk
- 1985–1990: CSKA Sofia
- 1989: Bulgaria
- 1991–1996: Bulgaria
- 1997: Al-Nassr
- 1998: Spartak Varna
- 1998–2000: CSKA Sofia
- 2003: Liaoning
- 2007: Bulgaria
- 2008–2009: CSKA Sofia
- 2011–2012: CSKA Sofia
- * Club domestic league appearances and goals

Dimitar Dushkov Penev (Bulgarian: Димитър Душков Пенев, 12 July 1945 – 3 January 2026) was a Bulgarian football player and coach who played as a central defender for CSKA Sofia. He was regarded as one of his country's best ever defenders, winning Bulgarian Footballer of the Year in 1967 and 1971. He played 90 games for the Bulgaria national team and scored two goals, participating in three FIFA World cups for his national team in 1966, 1970 and 1974. He was Honorary President of CSKA Sofia and semi-professional side Nottingham United FC.

== Coaching career ==
Penev was manager of the Bulgaria national team during the 1994 FIFA World Cup, where his team reached the semi-finals and then lost the bronze medal game with Sweden. Throughout his career as manager he demonstrated excellence in both tactics and team psychology. Penev's most notable quality was his ability to work well with young players. During his career at CSKA Sofia he discovered a lot of previously unknown or little-known talented youths and used them as a basis for a domestically and internationally successful squad. Amongst them Hristo Stoichkov, Emil Kostadinov, Lyuboslav Penev, Martin Petrov, Stiliyan Petrov and Dimitar Berbatov.

On 30 July 2007, he was appointed manager of the Bulgaria national team for the second time. Last he was the manager of CSKA Sofia, but on 6 March 2009 CSKA fired the coach – the Bulgarian team decided to substitute him with his nephew Lyuboslav Penev.

== Relevant statistics ==
As of April 2007, Penev had been in charge of the Bulgaria national team for 55 matches in total (25 wins, 15 draws, 15 losses, with a goal difference of 88:60).

== Personal life and death ==
Penev died on 3 January 2026, at the age of 80.

Bulgarian Presidents Petar Stoyanov and Georgi Parvanov are among the thousands who came to the Vasil Levski National Stadium on January 5, 2026 to pay their last respects to Dimitar Penev.

He was the uncle of former Bulgarian international and national team coach Lyuboslav Penev.

== Honours ==
=== Player ===
Lokomotiv Sofia

- A Group: 1963–64

CSKA Sofia

- A Group (7): 1965–66, 1968–69, 1970–71, 1971–72, 1972–73, 1974–75, 1975–76
- Bulgarian Cup: 1964–65, 1968–69, 1971–72, 1972–73, 1973–74

=== Manager ===
Bulgaria

- FIFA World Cup: fourth place 1994
