= Boris Gaganelov =

Bulgarian footballer and coach (1941–2020)

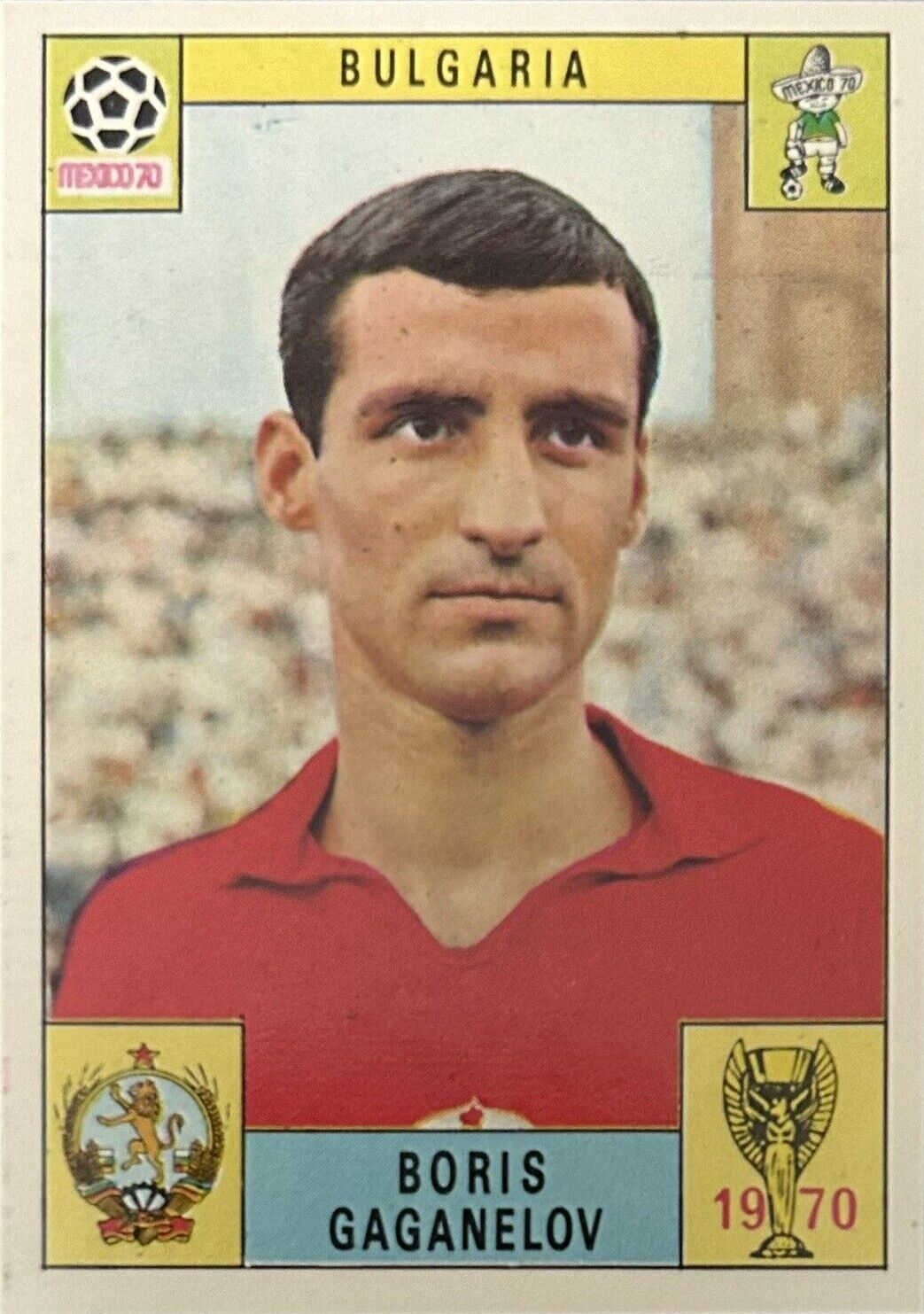
- Gaganelov at the 1970 FIFA World Cup

Personal information
- Full name: Boris Atanasov Gaganelov
- Date of birth: 7 October 1941
- Place of birth: Petrich, Bulgaria
- Date of death: 5 June 2020 (aged 78)
- Place of death: Sofia, Bulgaria
- Position: Defender

Senior career*
Years	Team	Apps	(Gls)
1957–1960	Belasitsa Petrich		
1960–1974	CSKA Sofia	350	(2)

International career
1963–1970	Bulgaria	51	(0)

Managerial career
- 1980: Bulgaria (assistant)
- 1994: CSKA Sofia
- * Club domestic league appearances and goals

Boris Atanasov Gaganelov (Bulgarian: Борис Aтанасов Гаганелов; 7 October 1941 – 5 June 2020) was a Bulgarian football player and later coach.

Gaganelov was born in Petrich. He made 51 appearances for the Bulgaria national football team. He represented Bulgaria at the FIFA World Cups in 1966 and 1970.

He died on 5 June 2020 at the age of 78 in Sofia.

== Honours ==
=== Player ===
CSKA Sofia

- A Group (7): 1960–61, 1961–62, 1965–66, 1968–69, 1970–71, 1971–72, 1972–73
- Bulgarian Cup (6): 1961, 1965, 1969, 1972, 1973, 1974
