= Dobromir Zhechev =

Bulgarian football player and manager (1942–2025)

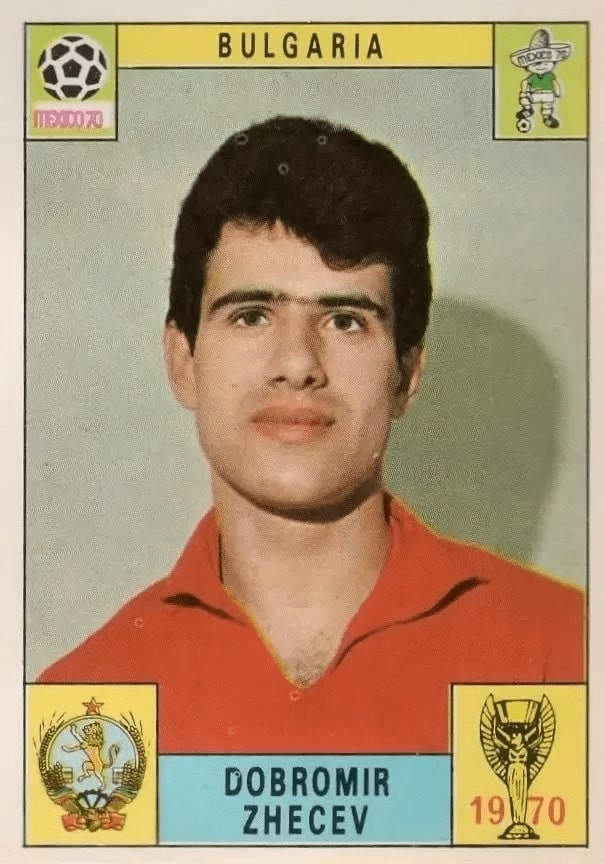
- Zhechev at the 1970 FIFA World Cup

Personal information
- Full name: Dobromir Georgiev Zhechev
- Date of birth: 12 November 1942
- Place of birth: Sofia, Bulgaria
- Date of death: 12 October 2025 (aged 82)
- Place of death: Bulgaria
- Position: Defender

Senior career*
Years	Team	Apps	(Gls)
1958–1968	Spartak Sofia	216	(7)
1968–1974	Levski Sofia	153	(12)
Total		369	(19)

International career
1961–1974	Bulgaria	67	(1)

Managerial career
- 1975: Levski Sofia (assistant)
- 1975–1976: Aris Thessaloniki
- 1976–1977: PAS Giannina
- 1977–1978: Veria
- 1979–1981: Botev Vratsa
- 1981–1983: Levski Sofia
- 1983–1984: Haskovo
- 1985–1988: Lokomotiv GO
- 1989: Levski Sofia
- 1991: Dunav Ruse
- 1994: PAS Giannina
- 1995: Dunav Ruse
- 1999: Lokomotiv GO
- 2001–2002: Al-Najma
- 2010–2011: Velbazhd
- * Club domestic league appearances and goals

Dobromir Georgiev Zhechev (Bulgarian: Добромир Георгиев Жечев; 12 November 1942 – 12 October 2025) was a Bulgarian football player and manager.

== Life and career ==
Zhechev was born in Sofia. At club level he played for Spartak and Levski in his home town. He was also capped 67 times for the Bulgaria national team and was part of the squad at four World Cups, which makes him the only Bulgarian footballer who has played in four FIFA World Cups so far. European champion with the Bulgarian national under-19 team in 1959. Dobromir Zhechev was also 1973–76 Balkan Cup champion. As manager of Levski Sofia, he won one Bulgarian Cup in 1982. Zhechev died in October 2025, at the age of 82.

== Honours ==
Spartak Sofia

- Bulgarian Cup: 1967–68

Levski Sofia

- A PFG: 1969–70, 1973–74
- Bulgarian Cup: 1969–70, 1970–71
