= Nikola Yordanov =

Bulgarian footballer

Nikola Yordanov Bulgarian: Никола Йорданов
Personal information
- Date of birth: October 23, 1938
- Place of birth: Ruse, Bulgaria
- Date of death: July 31, 1991 (aged 52)
- Position: Forward

Senior career*
Years	Team	Apps	(Gls)
- Dunav Ruse
- Spartak Pleven
- Lokomotiv Ruse
- * Club domestic league appearances and goals

Nikola Yordanov (Bulgarian: Никола Йорданов) (23 October 1938 – 31 July 1991) was a Bulgarian association football player. He was the top scorer of the 1962 championship (with 23 goals for Dunav Ruse).

== Biography ==
A native of Ruse, Yordanov played as a forward for Dunav Ruse, Spartak Pleven and Lokomotiv Ruse.

Starting from 2011, an international youth tournament is being held every summer in Ruse, to honor Nikola Yordanov.
