= Nikola Kovachev =

Bulgarian footballer and manager

Personal information
- Full name: Nikola Dimitrov Kovachev
- Date of birth: 4 June 1934
- Place of birth: Blagoevgrad, Kingdom of Bulgaria
- Date of death: 26 November 2009 (aged 75)
- Position: Defender

Senior career*
Years	Team	Apps	(Gls)
1950–1954	Pirin Blagoevgrad		
1955–1956	Botev Plovdiv	41	(3)
1957–1966	CSKA Sofia	174	(13)

International career
1956–1963	Bulgaria	46	(2)

Managerial career
- 1973: Hebar Pazardzhik
- 1974: CSKA Sofia
- 1974–1975: Hebar Pazardzhik
- 1977–1979: CSKA Sofia
Medal record
Third place	Olympic Games	1956
- * Club domestic league appearances and goals

Nikola Dimitrov Kovachev (Bulgarian: Никола Димитров Ковачев; Blagoevgrad, 4 June 1934 – Sofia, 26 November 2009) was a Bulgarian football player and manager.

Kovachev played for Bulgaria at the 1956 and 1960 Summer Olympics. He coached Hebar Pazardzhik and CSKA Sofia.

== Honours ==
=== International ===
Bulgaria

- Olympic Bronze Medal: 1956
