= Bozhidar Grigorov =

Bulgarian footballer (born 1945)

Personal information
- Full name: Bozhidar Ivanov Grigorov
- Date of birth: 27 July 1945 (age 81)
- Place of birth: Sofia, Bulgaria
- Position: Forward

Senior career*
| Years | Team | Apps | (Gls) |
| 1964–1967 | Orlin Pirdop | | |
| 1967–1979 | Slavia Sofia | 301 | (128) |

International career
| 1969–1974 | Bulgaria | 7 | (2) |
- * Club domestic league appearances and goals

Bozhidar Ivanov Grigorov (Bulgarian: Божидар Иванов Гpигopов; born 27 July 1945) is a Bulgarian former footballer who played as a forward.

Grigorov is best known for his career with Slavia Sofia, for whom he made over 300 appearances in 12 seasons with the club. He played for Slavia in the 1969–70 Inter-Cities Fairs Cup, scoring two goals in the team's 1st round victory over Valencia CF.

Grigorov played 7 times and scored 2 goals for Bulgaria. He was in the Bulgarian squad for both the 1970 and 1974 World Cups.
