= Hristo Marinchev =

Personal information
- Full name: Hristo Kirilov Marinchev
- Date of birth: 10 September 1941
- Place of birth: Zlatolist, Bulgaria
- Height: 1.73 m (5 ft 8 in)
- Position: Defender

Youth career
- ?: Belasitsa (Petrich)

Senior career*
Years	Team	Apps	(Gls)
1958–1963	Belasitsa (Petrich)	N\A	(N\A)
1963–1970	CSKA Sofia	135	(2)
1970–1973	PFC Cherno More Varna	68	(1)
- * Club domestic league appearances and goals

Hristo Kirilov Marinchev-Mery is a former Bulgarian footballer, defender. He played for Belasitsa (Petrich) (1958 – 1963), CSKA (Sofia) (1963 – 1970) and the PFC Cherno More Varna (1970 – 1973).

With the team of CSKA Sofia he was a two-time champion of Bulgaria in 1966 and 1969 and a two-time winner of the Cup of the Soviet Army in 1965 and 1969.

Marinchev are 3 matches for the first team and 6 matches for the "B" national football team of Bulgaria.

For CSKA there are 15 matches in the European tournaments.
