= Stoyan Ormandzhiev =

Bulgarian footballer and manager

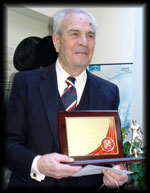

Personal information
- Date of birth: 10 January 1920
- Place of birth: Sozopol, Kingdom of Bulgaria
- Date of death: 10 October 2006 (aged 86)
- Place of death: Sofia, Bulgaria
- Position: Defender

Senior career*
| Years | Team | Apps | (Gls) |
| 1936 | Radetski Varna | | |
| 1937–1940 | Vladislav | 56 | (5) |
| 1941–1949 | Lokomotiv Sofia | 112 | (6) |

International career
| 1938–1949 | Bulgaria | 20 | (0) |

Managerial career
- 1950–1960: Bulgaria
- 1963: Bulgaria
- 1965–1969: CSKA Sofia
- 1974–1975: Cherno More Varna
- 1974–1977: Bulgaria
- 1979–1980: Alpine Donawitz
Medal record
| Third place | Olympic Games | 1956 |
- * Club domestic league appearances and goals

Stoyan Ormandzhiev (Bulgarian: Стоян Орманджиев; 10 January 1920 – 10 October 2006) was a Bulgarian footballer and manager, who managed two European clubs and the Bulgaria national team during his career.

== Sources ==
- "Stoyan Ormandzhiev "Pashata"". European Football.
