= Dimitar Yakimov =

Bulgarian footballer

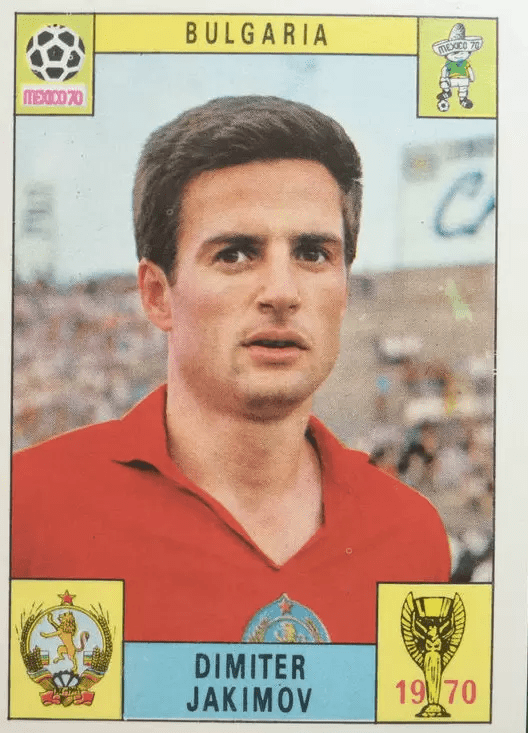
- Yakimov at the 1970 FIFA World Cup

Personal information
- Full name: Dimitar Nikolov Yakimov
- Date of birth: 12 August 1941 (age 85)
- Place of birth: Šlegovo, Kingdom of Bulgaria (now North Macedonia)
- Height: 1.84 m (6 ft 0 in)
- Positions: Attacking midfielder; forward

Senior career*
Years	Team	Apps	(Gls)
1958–1960	Septemvri Sofia	21	(10)
1960–1974	CSKA Sofia	287	(141)
Total		308	(151)

International career
1959–1973	Bulgaria	67	(9)
- * Club domestic league appearances and goals

Dimitar Nikolov Yakimov (Bulgarian: Димитър Николов Якимов; born 12 August 1941) is a Bulgarian former professional footballer who played as an attacking midfielder or forward. He represented Septemvri Sofia and CSKA Sofia at club level, and the Bulgaria national team internationally.

== International career ==
Yakimov was part of the Bulgaria under-18 team that won the 1959 UEFA European Under-18 Championship. On 11 October 1959, he first played for the Bulgarian senior squad, in a match versus France. Yakimov played for Bulgaria at the 1960 Summer Olympics.

== Honours ==
Septemvri Sofia

- Bulgarian Cup: 1959–60

CSKA Sofia

- Bulgarian League (7): 1960–61, 1961–62, 1965–66, 1968–69, 1970–71, 1971–72, 1972–73
- Bulgarian Cup: 1960–61, 1964–65, 1968–69, 1971–72

Individual

- Bulgarian League top scorer: 1970–71
- World XI: 1966, 1967
