= Borislav Sretkov =

Bulgarian footballer

Personal information
- Date of birth: 10 November 1952 (age 73)
- Place of birth: Sofia, Bulgaria
- Position: Midfielder

Senior career*
Years	Team	Apps	(Gls)
1971–1979	CSKA Sofia		

International career
1978–1979	Bulgaria	4	(0)
- * Club domestic league appearances and goals

Borislav Sretkov (Bulgarian: Борислав Сретков, born 10 November 1952) is a retired Bulgarian football midfielder.
