= Georgi Kamenov =

Bulgarian footballer

Personal information
- Date of birth: 9 September 1941 (age 85)
- Place of birth: Gradeshnitsa, Bulgaria
- Position: Striker

Youth career
- Chavdar Byala Slatina

Senior career*
Years	Team	Apps	(Gls)
1960–1962	Chavdar Byala Slatina		
1962–1975	Botev Vratsa	285	(150)
- * Club domestic league appearances and goals

Georgi Kamenov (Bulgarian: Георги Каменов; born 9 September 1941) is a former Bulgarian footballer who played as a striker.

Born in Gradeshnitsa, Vratsa Province, Kamenov spent 13 seasons of his career at Botev Vratsa. He is Botev's all-time top goalscorer in the Bulgarian A Group, scoring 150 goals for the club in 285 games.
