= Stoyan Yordanov =

Bulgarian footballer (1944–2025)

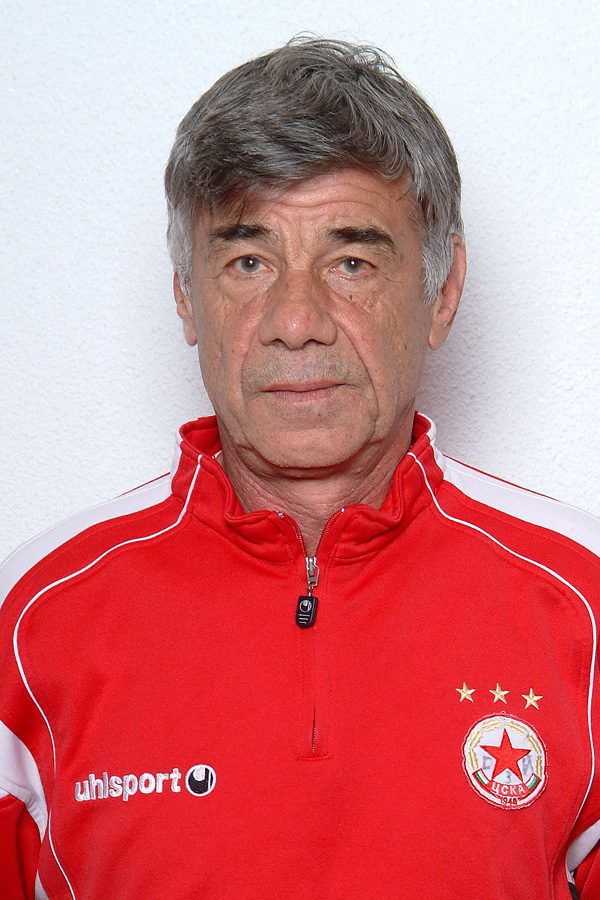

Personal information
- Full name: Stoyan Ivanov Yordanov
- Date of birth: 29 January 1944
- Place of birth: Sofia, Bulgaria
- Date of death: 14 November 2025 (aged 81)
- Height: 1.85 m (6 ft 1 in)
- Position: Goalkeeper

Youth career
- 1954–1961: Akademik Sofia
- 1961–1963: CSKA Sofia

Senior career*
Years	Team	Apps	(Gls)
1963–1977	CSKA Sofia	241	(0)
1977–1978	Sliven	28	(0)
1978–1979	Cherno More	3	(0)
Total		272	(0)

International career
1968–1977	Bulgaria	25	(0)
- * Club domestic league appearances and goals

Stoyan Ivanov Yordanov (Bulgarian: Cтоян Иванов Йорданов; 29 January 1944 – 14 November 2025) was a Bulgarian footballer who played as a goalkeeper.

At international level, Yordanov represented the Bulgaria national team on 25 occasions between 1968 and 1975, and participated at the 1970 FIFA World Cup and the 1968 Olympics, where he won a silver medal. After his retirement, he worked in a coaching capacity with CSKA Sofia and also managed the Bulgaria U21 team.

Yordanov died on 14 November 2025, at the age of 81.

== Honours ==
CSKA Sofia

- Bulgarian League (7): 1965–66, 1968–69, 1970–71, 1971–72, 1972–73, 1974–75, 1975–76
- Bulgarian Cup: 1965, 1969, 1972, 1973, 1974
