= Plamen Yankov =

Bulgarian boxer

Personal information
- Nationality: Bulgarian
- Born: 1 October 1954 (age 70)

Sport
- Sport: Boxing

Plamen Yankov (born 1 October 1954) is a Bulgarian boxer. He competed at the 1976 Summer Olympics and the 1980 Summer Olympics.
