= Nikola Tsanev =

Bulgarian footballer

Personal information
- Date of birth: 11 December 1939
- Place of birth: Sofia, Bulgaria
- Date of death: 7 October 2004 (aged 64)
- Place of death: Sofia, Bulgaria
- Position: Forward

Youth career
- Cherveno Zname Sofia

Senior career*
Years	Team	Apps	(Gls)
1958–1959	Levski Sofia	5	(1)
1959–1970	CSKA Sofia	238	(118)
Total		243	(119)

International career
1960–1967	Bulgaria	8	(3)
- * Club domestic league appearances and goals

Nikola Tsanev (Bulgarian: Никола Цанев; 11 December 1939 – 7 October 2004) was a Bulgarian footballer, who played as a forward. He played for Bulgaria in 8 matches, scoring 3 goals. He also competed in the men's tournament at the 1960 Summer Olympics.

== Career ==
Tsanev started his career with Levski Sofia, but is mainly remembered for his highly successful career with CSKA Sofia during the 60s. With CSKA, he won the A Group title six times and the Bulgarian Cup three times. During the 1963–64 season, he scored 26 league goals to become A Group top goalscorer.
