= Petar Zhekov =

Bulgarian footballer (1944–2023)

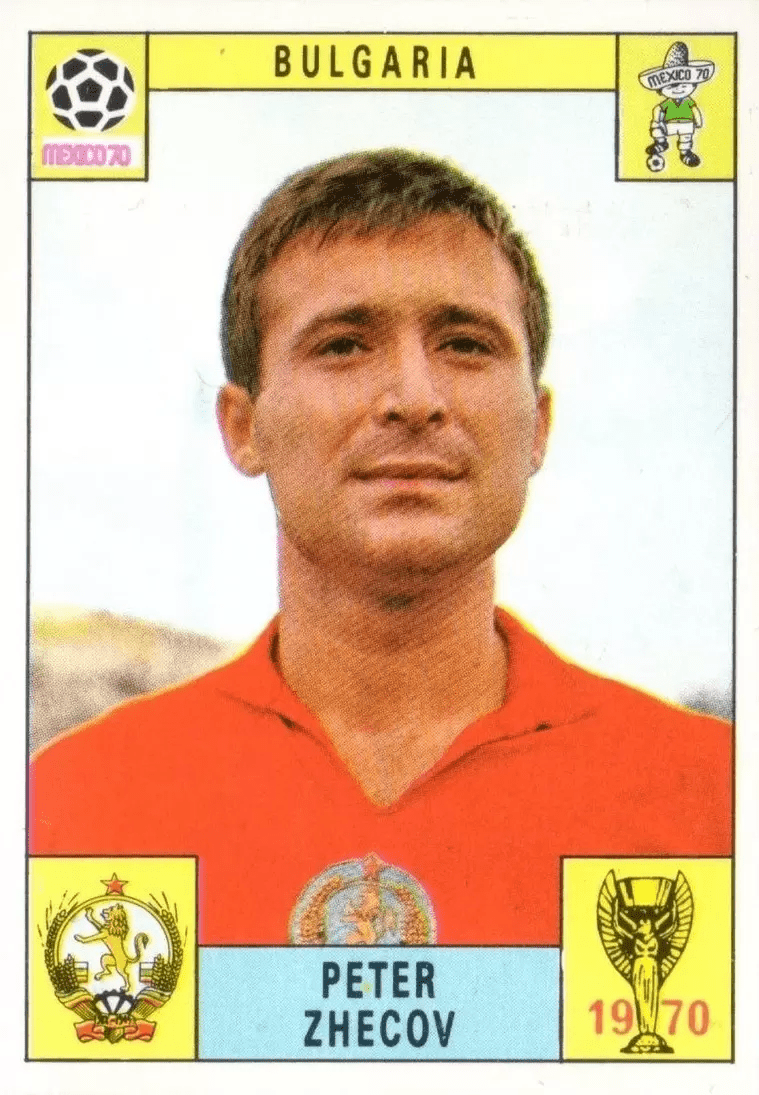
- Zhekov at the 1970 FIFA World Cup

Personal information
- Full name: Petar Petrov Zhekov
- Date of birth: 10 October 1944
- Place of birth: Knizhovnik, Bulgaria
- Date of death: 18 February 2023 (aged 78)
- Place of death: Sofia, Bulgaria
- Height: 1.82 m (6 ft 0 in)
- Position: Forward

Senior career*
Years	Team	Apps	(Gls)
1962–1963	Dimitrovgrad	25	(8)
1963–1968	Beroe Stara Zagora	141	(101)
1968–1975	CSKA Sofia	167	(144)
Total		333	(253)

International career
1964–1973	Bulgaria	44	(25)

Managerial career
- 1976–1977: Hebar Pazardzhik
- 2000: Dobrudzha Dobrich
Medal record
Olympic Games
Silver medal – second place	1968 Mexico City	Team competition
- * Club domestic league appearances and goals

Petar Petrov Zhekov (Bulgarian: Петър Петров Жеков, 10 October 1944 – 18 February 2023) was a Bulgarian footballer, widely regarded as one of the best forwards in the history of the Bulgarian football. He won the silver medal at the 1968 Summer Olympics.

Zhekov was born in Knizhovnik, Haskovo Province, and began his career at F.C. Dimitrovgrad. He was initially deployed as a defender, but on the advice of manager Hristo Hadzhiev switched to the forward position. Later he moved to Beroe Stara Zagora, where he twice became Bulgaria's top goalscorer. Between 1968 and 1975 Zhekov played for CSKA Sofia and scored 144 goals for the team. This makes him the club's best goalscorer of all time. He also won the European Golden Boot in 1969 and two European Bronze Boots. He had 333 appearances and a record of 253 goals in the Bulgarian A Group. He is CSKA's all-time top scorer with 175 goals

Zhekov later coached PFC Hebar Pazardzhik. He died on 18 February 2023, at the age of 78.

== Career statistics ==
Appearances and goals by club, season and competition
Club	Season	League		Europe		Total	
Club	Season	Apps	Goals	Apps	Goals	Apps	Goals
Dimitrovgrad	1962–63	25	8	–		25	8
Beroe	1963–64	27	11	–		27	11
Beroe	1964–65	30	18	–		30	18
Beroe	1965–66	26	20	–		26	20
Beroe	1966–67	29	21	–		29	21
Beroe	1967–68	29	31	–		29	31
CSKA Sofia	1968–69	29	36	0	0	29	36
CSKA Sofia	1969–70	28	31	2	2	30	33
CSKA Sofia	1970–71	27	16	4	2	31	18
CSKA Sofia	1971–72	33	27	3	1	36	28
CSKA Sofia	1972–73	31	29	4	2	35	31
CSKA Sofia	1973–74	14	2	4	2	18	4
CSKA Sofia	1974–75	5	3	1	0	6	3
Career total		333	253	18	9	351	262

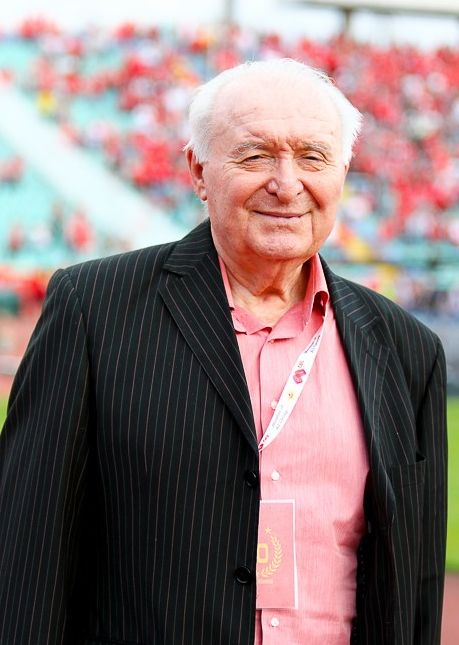
Zhekov in 2018

== Honours ==
CSKA Sofia

- Bulgarian League: 1968–69, 1970–71, 1971–72, 1972–73, 1974–75
- Bulgarian Cup: 1969, 1972, 1973, 1974

Individual

- European Golden Boot: 1969
- Bulgarian League top scorer (6): 1967, 1968, 1969, 1970, 1972, 1973
