= Asparuh Nikodimov =

Bulgarian footballer (born 1945)

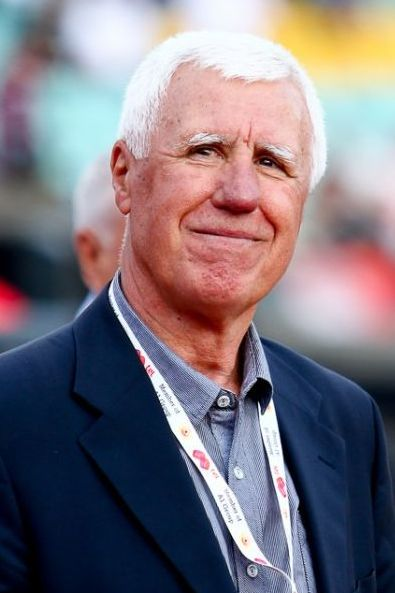

Personal information
- Full name: Asparuh Donev Nikodimov
- Date of birth: 21 August 1945 (age 81)
- Place of birth: Bogyovtsi, Sofia Province, Bulgaria
- Position: Midfielder

Youth career
- 1961–1962: Septemvri Sofia

Senior career*
Years	Team	Apps	(Gls)
1962–1964	Septemvri Sofia		
1964–1975	CSKA Sofia	296	(58)
1975–1978	Sliven		

International career
1966–1974	Bulgaria	25	(6)

Managerial career
- 1979–1983: CSKA Sofia
- 1983–1984: Dunav Ruse
- 1989–1990: ES Sahel
- 1991–1992: CSKA Sofia
- 1995–1996: Metalurg Pernik
- 1997–1999: Velbazhd Kyustendil
- 2000: Omonia
- 2001: CSKA Sofia
- 2002: PAS Patraikos
- 2003–2004: Beroe Stara Zagora
- * Club domestic league appearances and goals

Olympic medal record

Men's Football
Silver medal – second place	1968 Mexico City	Team competition

Asparuh "Paro" Donev Nikodimov (Bulgarian: Аспарух Донев Никодимов; born 21 August 1945) is a Bulgarian former football player and coach.

He represented Bulgaria at the FIFA World Cups in 1970 and 1974.

== Playing career ==
Nikodimov began playing football at the age of 16 in the youth team of Septemvri Sofia, where he played until he joined CSKA Sofia at the age of 19.

In 1964 Nikodimov joined CSKA Sofia. During his time at CSKA, he won many honours, including six A PFG titles and five Bulgarian Cups. He played 296 league matches, scoring 58 goals for 11 seasons.

Nikodimov ended his career in 1978, playing for Sliven.

== Managerial career ==
Nikodimov began his managerial career with CSKA Sofia in 1979, guiding them to four consecutive league titles.

== Personal life ==
Nikodimov is married to Svetla and has two daughters who are volleyball players. One of them is married to the volleyball coach of CSKA Sofia Alexander Popov.

== Career statistics ==
=== International ===
Appearances and goals by national team and year
National team	Year	Apps	Goals
Bulgaria	1966	1	0
Bulgaria	1967	2	1
Bulgaria	1968	7	3
Bulgaria	1969	1	0
Bulgaria	1970	9	2
Bulgaria	1971	1	0
Bulgaria	1972	–	
Bulgaria	1973	–	
Bulgaria	1974	4	0
Total		25	6

Scores and results list Bulgaria's goal tally first, score column indicates score after each Nikodimov goal.

List of international goals scored by Asparuh Nikodimov
No.	Date	Venue	Opponent	Score	Result	Competition
1	22 November 1967	Vasil Levski National Stadium, Sofia, Bulgaria	Turkey	2–0	3–0	1968 Summer Olympics qualification
2	2 October 1968	Estadio León, León, Mexico	Ghana	?–0	10–0	Friendly
3	14 October 1968	Estadio León, León, Mexico	Thailand	6–0	7–0	1968 Summer Olympics
4	18 October 1968	Estadio León, León, Mexico	Guatemala	1–0	2–1	1968 Summer Olympics
5	21 February 1970	National Stadium of Peru, Lima, Peru	Peru	1–1	3–1	Friendly
6	7 June 1970	Estadio León, León, Mexico	West Germany	1–0	2–5	1970 FIFA World Cup

== Honours ==
=== Player honours ===
CSKA Sofia

- Bulgarian League: 1965–66, 1968–69, 1970–71, 1971–72, 1972–73, 1974–75
- Bulgarian Cup: 1965, 1969, 1972, 1973, 1974
- ECC: semi-finalist 1966-67

=== Managerial honours ===
CSKA Sofia

- Bulgarian League: 1979–80, 1980–81, 1981–82, 1982–83, 1991–92
- Bulgarian Cup: 1983
- ECC: semi-finalist 1981-82
