= Manol Manolov =

Bulgarian footballer and manager (1925–2008)

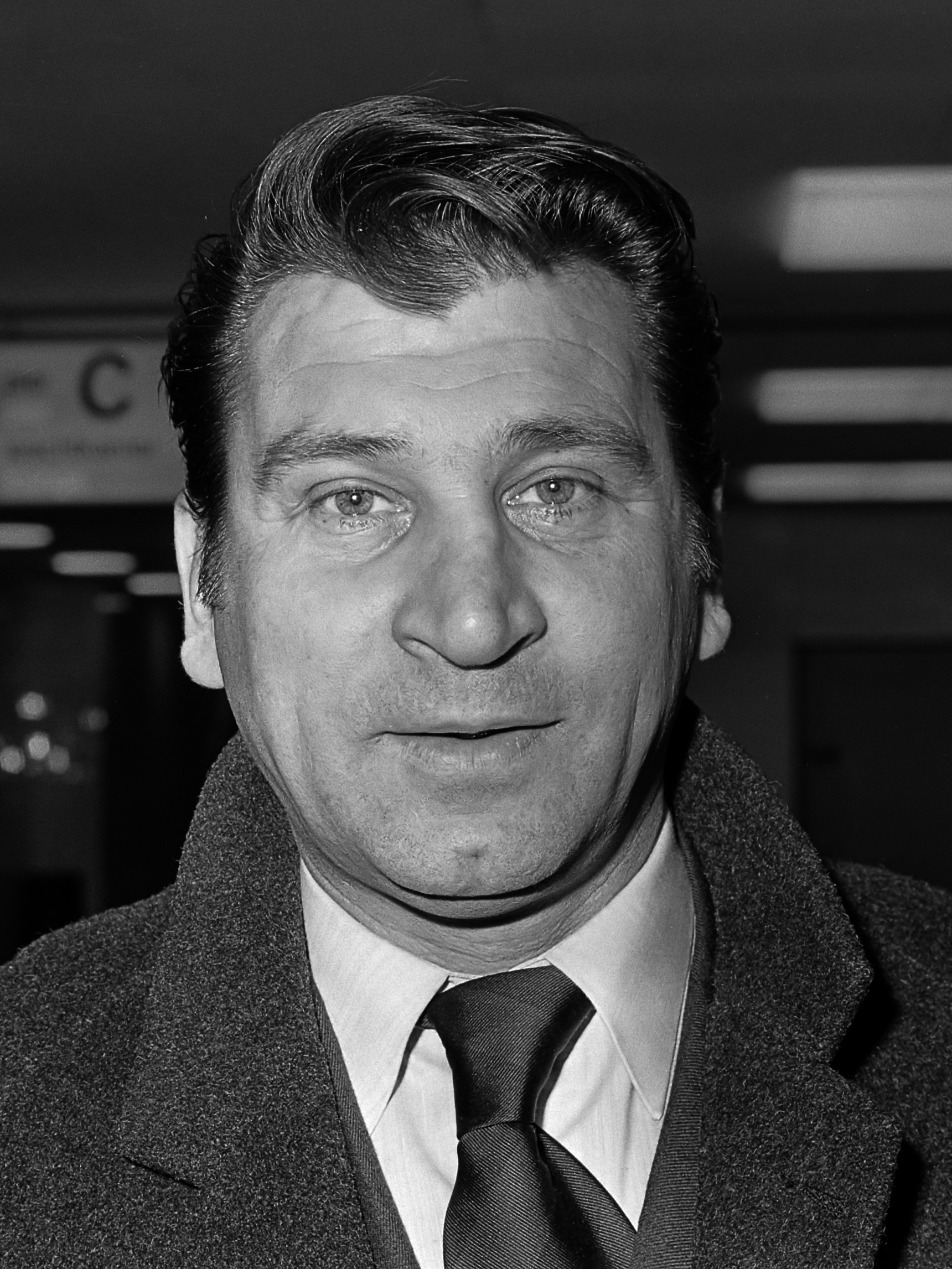
- Manolov in 1972

Personal information
- Date of birth: 4 August 1925
- Place of birth: Sofia, Bulgaria
- Date of death: 16 December 2008 (aged 83)
- Position: Defender

Senior career*
Years	Team	Apps	(Gls)
1942–1944	Ustrem Sofia		
1944–1948	Septemvri Sofia		
1948–1962	CSKA Sofia	239	(8)

International career
1950–1961	Bulgaria	57	(1)

Managerial career
- 1962–1963: Cherno More Varna
- 1965–1966: Beroe
- 1969–1974: CSKA Sofia
- 1974: Hebar Pazardzhik
- 1974–1975: CSKA Sofia
- 1975–1980: Apollon Athens
- 1980: Slavia
- 1981: Ethnikos Piraeus
- 1982–1983: Panserraikos
- 1984–1985: CSKA Sofia
- * Club domestic league appearances and goals

Olympic medal record

Men's Football
Bronze medal – third place	1956 Melbourne	Team competition

Manol Manolov (Bulgarian: Манол Манолов; 4 August 1925 – 16 December 2008) was a Bulgarian football defender and manager.

== Biography ==
Born in Sofia, Manolov featured in 57 games for the Bulgaria national football team and won a bronze medal at the 1956 Summer Olympics. Between 1948 and 1962, he played in 239 matches and scored 8 goals for CSKA Sofia. He was honoured as Bulgarian Footballer of the Year in 1958. Manolov won the top Bulgarian league, the A PFG, a record twelve times (all with CSKA), as well as the Bulgarian Cup, four times (all with CSKA). He coached Beroe, CSKA Sofia, Hebar Pazardzhik, Ethnikos Piraeus, Apollon Athens, Slavia and Panserraikos.

== Honours ==
=== Player ===
- CSKA Sofia
  - Bulgarian League (12): 1948, 1951, 1952, 1954, 1955, 1956, 1957, 1958, 1959, 1960, 1961, 1962
  - Bulgarian Cup (5): 1951, 1954, 1955, 1960,1961

=== Coach ===
- CSKA Sofia
  - Bulgarian League: 1971, 1972, 1973
  - Bulgarian Cup: 1972, 1973, 1985
  - Cup of the Soviet Army: 1985
