= Tsvetan Atanasov =

Bulgarian footballer

Personal information
- Full name: Tsvetan Slavev Atanasov
- Date of birth: 10 April 1948 (age 78)
- Place of birth: Herakovo, Sofia Province, Bulgaria
- Position: Midfielder

Senior career*
Years	Team	Apps	(Gls)
1966–1976	CSKA Sofia	231	(36)

International career
1968 – 1974	Bulgaria	9	(2)
- * Club domestic league appearances and goals

Tsvetan Atanasov (Bulgarian: Цветан Атанасов) (born 10 April 1948) was a Bulgarian football player who was deployed as a central midfield. He played for CSKA Sofia form the spring of 1966 to the 1976 having 231 match and 36 goals for the A PFG. He is champion with CSKA Sofia (1966, 1969, 1971–1973, 1975, 1976), Four times winner of the Bulgarian Cup (1969, 1972–1974) With 18 match and 3 goals for CSKA Sofia in European Tournaments. Participated in the Champions League 1/2 Final (1967) and 1/4 Final (1974). He was coach of CSKA Sofia in three matches in the spring of 1995.
