= Eternal derby of Bulgarian football =

Sports rivalry

The Eternal Derby
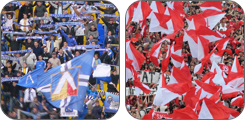
- Fans of Levski Sofia (left) and CSKA Sofia (right)
- Location: Sofia, Bulgaria
- Teams: Levski Sofia; CSKA Sofia
- First meeting: Levski 1–0 CSKA (5 May 1948; 78 years ago)
- Latest meeting: Levski 0–3 CSKA (8 November 2026)
- Next meeting: CSKA – Levski (April 2027) (First League)

Statistics
- Total meetings: 225
- Most wins: Levski (87)
- Most player appearances: Manol Manolov (35)
- Top scorer: Georgi Ivanov (15)
- Largest victory: CSKA 1–7 Levski (23 September 1994)
- Longest win streak: Levski (9)
- Current win streak: CSKA (2)

The Eternal derby of Bulgarian football or simply The Eternal derby (Bulgarian: Вечното дерби) is the name of the local derby football match between the two most popular and successful football clubs in Sofia and Bulgaria: Levski Sofia and CSKA Sofia. The dominant forces in Bulgarian football have won 27 and 31 national championship titles and 26 and 22 Bulgarian Cup titles, involved into 13 and 11 Doubles, respectively. The rivalry was chosen by COPA90 as the 2nd Maddest Derby in Eastern Europe.

== History ==
The rivalry started in the late 1940s when the newly founded club of CSKA became a champion in their first year in competitive football in 1948. Both the 1948–49 and 1950 seasons ended with the two teams facing each other in Soviet Army Cup finals with Levski Sofia winning on both occasions after extra time of the second final replay, as the previous two final matches had finished as draws.

During the years, as the two teams became more and more successful, they gained large supporter bases. The confrontations between the clubs and their fans became commonplace and often resulted in tense encounters on the pitch and hooligan clashes between the fans off the pitch.

The hostility reached its climax on 19 June 1985 during the Bulgarian Cup final held at Vasil Levski National Stadium when, after many disputable referee decisions, both teams demonstrated poor sportsmanship which resulted in regular fights between them on the pitch. On 21 June, the Central Committee of the Bulgarian Communist Party issued a decree that disbanded both teams. CSKA Septemvriysko zname had to be re-founded as Sredets and Levski-Spartak as Vitosha. Six players (including Hristo Stoichkov and Borislav Mihaylov) were banned for life from playing competitive football; many other players and staff members were banned for three months to one year. A year later, the decision was abolished and the players continued their sport careers.

Although both Levski and CSKA are still regarded as the two most popular and supported teams in Bulgaria, neither of the two sides had been crowned champion between 2008 and 2025. This has been mostly because of the rise of other clubs in the country, such as Litex Lovech and Ludogorets Razgrad. Litex won two consecutive titles in 2010 and 2011, while Ludogorets won 14 consecutive titles from 2012 to 2025. Despite this, the Eternal derby games are still usually the most attended ones in the league. In the 2010s, both CSKA and Levski experienced financial instability, with CSKA even being relegated to the third level of Bulgarian football after the 2014–15 season, while Levski was in very serious financial problems and ownership issues and was close to bankruptcy but the fans stepped in and saved the club. Since 2nd of June 2020 Nasko Sirakov has been a major owner and the club has been more stable financially in the last years.

== Venues ==
During the years, all the matches between Levski and CSKA were held at a neutral venue, in most cases at the Vasil Levski National Stadium. During the 2000s the clubs started to play their eternal derby matches at their own stadiums Georgi Asparuhov and Balgarska Armia but soon they decided to move the matches between them back to the National Stadium because of its higher capacity and the damages done on club stadiums by the visiting supporters.

Only once in the history of the Eternal derby it was held outside Sofia – in 1991, Levski won the Bulgarian Cup quarter-final 2–0 in a match that was played at Tundzha Stadium in Yambol.

== Results ==
Competition	Matches	Levski wins	draws	CSKA wins	Goal difference
League	170	59	49	62	220:234
Cup	41	22	10	9	69:45
Other	14	6	2	6	16:22
Total	225	87	61	77	305:301

Note: All matches that have finished with a win after extra time are represented as a win for the respective club. All matches that have finished with a penalty shoot-out are represented as draws with the final score after 120 minutes. As of 9 September 2026.

== Matches list ==
Levski win Draw CSKA win

=== A PFG / First League (1948–49 – present) ===
	Levski – CSKA						CSKA – Levski					
Season	Date	Venue	Attend.	Score	Home goals	Away goals	Date	Venue	Attend.	Score	Home goals	Away goals
1948–49	11–12–1948	Yunak Stadium	15,000	1–0	Hranov 40'	–	13–07–1949	Yunak Stadium	18,000	0–0	–	–
1950	23–03–1950	Yunak Stadium	15,000	1–0	A. Dimitrov 54'	–	11–06–1950	Balgarska Armia Stadium	20,000	0–0	–	–
1951	12–09–1951	Balgarska Armia Stadium	25,000	2–0	T. Stoyanov 17'; Popdimitrov 71'	–	06–05–1951	Balgarska Armia Stadium	25,000	2–1	Yankov 71'; D. Milanov 80'	A. Dimitrov 74'
1952	04–04–1952	Yunak Stadium	20,000	1–3	A. Dimitrov 66'	D. Milanov 12'; P. Panayotov 34', 76'	23–09–1952	Rakovski Stadium	20,000	1–0	P. Mihaylov 51'	–
1953	23–09–1953	Vasil Levski National Stadium	40,000	0–5	–	Rakarov 27'; I. Kolev 57'; Yankov 72'; D. Iliev 82' (o.g.); K. Yanev 87'	29–03–1953	Balgarska Armia Stadium	25,000	0–1	–	Kardashev 73'
1954	15–11–1954	Balgarska Armia Stadium	25,000	1–3	Peev 86'	I. Kolev 18'; P. Panayotov 19'; D. Milanov 38'	20–03–1954	Balgarska Armia Stadium	30,000	2–2	Bozhkov 6'; K. Yanev 21'	Popdimitrov 54'; Abadzhiev 63'
1955	30–09–1955	Vasil Levski National Stadium	50,000	0–3	–	Bozhkov 38' (pen.); K. Yanev 59'; I. Kolev 73'	31–03–1955	Vasil Levski National Stadium	50,000	3–1	P. Mihaylov 25'; Stefanov 42'; G. Dimitrov 56'	Abadzhiev 22'
1956	01–08–1956	Vasil Levski National Stadium	45,000	1–3	Pechenikov 12'	Bozhkov 29' (pen.); D. Milanov 53'; G. Dimitrov 58'	07–04–1956	Vasil Levski National Stadium	40,000	1–1	K. Yanev 47'	Takev 45'
1957	14–04–1957	Vasil Levski National Stadium	50,000	0–4	–	K. Yanev 21'; Bozhkov 30' (pen.); Rakarov 45'; I. Kolev 87'	28–08–1957	Vasil Levski National Stadium	50,000	0–0	–	–
1958	06–07–1958	Vasil Levski National Stadium	40,000	2–2	Yordanov 35'; H. Iliev 49' (pen.)	D. Milanov 31', 40'						
1958–59	23–08–1958	Vasil Levski National Stadium	50,000	0–2	–	Georgiev 3' (o.g.); I. Kolev 24'	08–03–1959	Vasil Levski National Stadium	50,000	0–1	–	H. Iliev 64'
1959–60	29–11–1959	Vasil Levski National Stadium	50,000	1–1	Yordanov 30'	Bozhkov 71' (pen.)	29–05–1960	Vasil Levski National Stadium	50,000	3–2	D. Milanov 33'; I. Kolev 55', 71'	Yordanov 48', 50'
1960–61	16–09–1960	Vasil Levski National Stadium	50,000	1–0	Sokolov 52'	–	12–03–1961	Vasil Levski National Stadium	50,000	2–0	I. Kolev 25' (pen.); Rankov 72'	–
1961–62	15–07–1962	Vasil Levski National Stadium	50,000	6–3	Yordanov 1', 15', 37', 77'; Abadzhiev 47'; Sokolov 61' (pen.)	Yakimov 42', 66'; Kovachev 68' (pen.)	26–11–1961	Vasil Levski National Stadium	50,000	1–1	Rankov 27'	Dochev 25'
1962–63	27–12–1962	Vasil Levski National Stadium	40,000	3–2	H. Iliev 4', 25'; Abadzhiev 87'	I. Kolev 57'; Yakimov 62'	25–05–1963	Vasil Levski National Stadium	45,000	1–1	Tsanev 32'	Yordanov 25'
1963–64	05–10–1963	Vasil Levski National Stadium	50,000	2–1	A. Kostov 27'; Yordanov 66'	Tsanev 87'	18–04–1964	Vasil Levski National Stadium	45,000	1–2	Tsanev 21'	A. Kostov 58'; Asparuhov 74'
1964–65	13–09–1964	Vasil Levski National Stadium	50,000	1–0	Sokolov 89'	–	10–04–1965	Ovcha Kupel Stadium	38,000	0–3	–	H. Iliev 10'; Asparuhov 54', 72'
1965–66	28–04–1966	Vasil Levski National Stadium	60,000	0–3	–	Zafirov 13'; Tsanev 28'; I. Kolev 55'	10–04–1966	Vasil Levski National Stadium	62,000	1–0	Tsanev 44'	–
1966–67	11–03–1967	Vasil Levski National Stadium	70,000	1–1	Veselinov 32'	Nikodimov 21'	03–09–1966	Vasil Levski National Stadium	50,000	3–1	Yakimov 50', 61'; D. Penev 75'	H. Iliev 84'
1967–68	29–10–1967	Vasil Levski National Stadium	65,000	1–1	Sokolov 61'	Marashliev 10'	15–06–1968	Vasil Levski National Stadium	65,000	0–0	–	–
1968–69	31–05–1969	Vasil Levski National Stadium	70,000	1–3	Panov 81'	D. Penev 1'; Zhekov 30', 46'	17–11–1968	Vasil Levski National Stadium	55,000	2–7	Zhekov 2'; T. Atanasov 89'	Asparuhov 7', 59', 78' (pen.); A. Kostov 23'; Kirilov 24', 56'; Bogdanov 45'
1969–70	07–07–1970	Vasil Levski National Stadium	32,000	5–2	Kotkov 1', 12', 35' (pen.), 37'; Veselinov 69'	Zhekov 6', 73' (pen.)	01–11–1969	Vasil Levski National Stadium	60,000	4–2	Marashliev 18'; Zhekov 26', 64' (pen.); Yakimov 75'	Kotkov 35' (pen.); Asparuhov 86' (pen.)
1970–71	20–12–1970	Vasil Levski National Stadium	35,000	2–2	Mitkov 28'; Veselinov 35'	Zhekov 27'; Yakimov 75'	28–06–1971	Vasil Levski National Stadium	60,000	0–1	–	Veselinov 60'
1971–72	05–07–1972	Vasil Levski National Stadium	35,000	0–2	–	Denev 60'; Marashliev 90'	18–12–1971	Vasil Levski National Stadium	35,000	0–1	–	Pavlov 64'
1972–73	24–03–1973	Vasil Levski National Stadium	55,000	1–2	Panov 88'	Marashliev 59'; Zhekov 90'	17–09–1972	Vasil Levski National Stadium	30,000	2–2	Denev 28', 55'	Haralampiev 49'; Mitkov 75' (pen.)
1973–74	24–04–1974	Vasil Levski National Stadium	60,000	1–1	Panov 64'	N. Hristov 34'	12–11–1973	Vasil Levski National Stadium	50,000	0–1	–	T. Vasilev 27' (o.g.)
1974–75	28–09–1974	Vasil Levski National Stadium	40,000	1–2	Panov 79'	Marashliev 7'; S. Mihaylov 66'	18–04–1975	Vasil Levski National Stadium	55,000	1–0	Denev 70'	–
1975–76	07–05–1976	Vasil Levski National Stadium	65,000	1–3	Panov 79'	M. Goranov 5'; D. Dimitrov 65'; Denev 76'	04–12–1975	Vasil Levski National Stadium	45,000	1–4	Marashliev 67'	Y. Yordanov 5'; Panov 30'; Borisov 70'; Voynov 72'
1976–77	25–09–1976	Vasil Levski National Stadium	60,000	3–2	K. Milanov 56'; Panov 78'; Voynov 90' (pen.)	M. Goranov 35'; Yonchev 50'	09–04–1977	Vasil Levski National Stadium	65,000	1–3	Kolev 63' (pen.)	Barzov 3'; Panov 40', 60'
1977–78	29–10–1977	Vasil Levski National Stadium	50,000	4–1	Y. Yordanov 9', 47'; Nikolov 29'; Stankov 58'	Stefanov 68'	20–05–1978	Vasil Levski National Stadium	50,000	2–2	N. Hristov 22'; Sredkov 42'	Spasov 20'; G. Todorov 36'
1978–79	30–05–1979	Vasil Levski National Stadium	65,000	2–1	Milkov 57'; Barzov 78'	Markov 63'	03–12–1978	Vasil Levski National Stadium	25,000	2–1	Dzhevizov 3'; Yonchev 36'	Gochev 87' (pen.)
1979–80	22–03–1980	Vasil Levski National Stadium	40,000	2–3	Nikolchev 22'; Spasov 88' (pen.)	Dzhevizov 29', 55'; Valkov 34'	01–09–1979	Vasil Levski National Stadium	50,000	1–1	Dzhevizov 82'	Stankov 57'
1980–81	25–04–1981	Vasil Levski National Stadium	35,000	2–0	P. Petrov 19'; Gochev 46'	–	07–10–1980	Vasil Levski National Stadium	55,000	2–2	Dzhevizov 64'; Valkov 69'	Panov 32'; Stankov 82'
1981–82	05–09–1981	Vasil Levski National Stadium	55,000	2–2	Valchev 17'; Barzov 90' (pen.)	Yonchev 12'; Bezinski 74'	13–03–1982	Vasil Levski National Stadium	45,000	2–1	Yonchev 12', 36'	Kurdov 46'
1982–83	15–12–1982	Vasil Levski National Stadium	30,000	0–0	–	–	08–05–1983	Vasil Levski National Stadium	40,000	0–3	–	Valchev 45'; Iskrenov 75'; Spasov 85'
1983–84	10–12–1983	Vasil Levski National Stadium	17,000	2–0	Chavdarov 52'; Iskrenov 72'	–	03–06–1984	Vasil Levski National Stadium	50,000	1–3	Slavkov 72'	Spasov 21'; Iskrenov 55'; P. Tsvetkov 88'
1984–85	09–03–1985	Vasil Levski National Stadium	31,000	3–1	P. Petrov 64'; P. Tsvetkov 80'; Gochev 88'	Markov 40'	22–08–1984	Vasil Levski National Stadium	30,000	0–1	–	Kurdov 18'
1985–86	22–12–1985	Georgi Asparuhov Stadium	25,000	1–3	Gochev 32'	L. Penev 6'; Mladenov 11', 41' (pen.)	31–08–1985	Balgarska Armia Stadium	30,000	1–2	Mladenov 13'	P. Tsvetkov 15'; Valchev 86'
1986–87	23–11–1986	Vasil Levski National Stadium	25,000	0–1	–	Bezinski 52'	30–05–1987	Vasil Levski National Stadium	50,000	1–0	Stoichkov 80'	–
1987–88	23–08–1987	Vasil Levski National Stadium	40,000	2–2	Sirakov 52'; Iskrenov 56'	Tanev 24'; Kirov 47'	06–03–1988	Vasil Levski National Stadium	40,000	2–3	L. Penev 6' (pen.); Kostadinov 8'	P. Petrov 18'; G. Yordanov 27'; Sirakov 29'
1988–89	17–09–1988	Vasil Levski National Stadium	35,000	2–2	Dragolov 3', 29'	Kostadinov 47'; Bachev 57'	01–04–1989	Vasil Levski National Stadium	40,000	2–1	Tanev 47', 49'	Velev 64' (pen.)
1989–90	07–04–1990	Vasil Levski National Stadium	30,000	2–2	Shalamanov 29'; Donkov 35'	Vitanov 17', 52'	01–10–1989	Vasil Levski National Stadium	30,000	5–0	T. Ivanov 34'; Stoichkov 49', 55', 61' (pen.), 76'	–
1990–91	20–10–1990	Vasil Levski National Stadium	25,000	0–1	–	G. Georgiev 10'	05–05–1991	Vasil Levski National Stadium	20,000	1–1	Redín 89'	Mihtarski 17'
1991–92	23–11–1991	Vasil Levski National Stadium	35,000	2–1	Sirakov 13'; I. Iliev 53'	Andonov 59'	24–05–1992	Vasil Levski National Stadium	25,000	2–2	Letchkov 13'; Metkov 47'	I. Iliev 62'; G. Dimitrov 77'
1992–93	17–10–1992	Vasil Levski National Stadium	25,000	1–3	Getov 60'	Metkov 10', 69'; Draganov 82' (pen.)	08–05–1993	Vasil Levski National Stadium	20,000	2–3	Babunski 5'; Draganov 23'	Getov 40', 78'; Sirakov 68'
1993–94	07–11–1993	Vasil Levski National Stadium	35,000	2–1	Borimirov 8'; Sirakov 79'	Andonov 12'	24–04–1994	Vasil Levski National Stadium	40,000	1–4	Stoilov 87'	Sirakov 22' (pen.), 50', 85'; P. Aleksandrov 36'
1994–95	02–04–1995	Vasil Levski National Stadium	20,000	3–0	G. N. Ivanov 44'; Borimirov 63' (pen.), 85' (pen.)	–	23–09–1994	Vasil Levski National Stadium	30,000	1–7	Mihtarski 20'	I. Iliev 12'; Sirakov 25' (pen.), 45', 79' (pen.), 90'; Borimirov 41', 64'
1995–96	18–11–1995	Vasil Levski National Stadium	8,000	3–1	Velev 30'; M. Hristov 52'; Simeonov 62'	Dartilov 24' (o.g.)	27–04–1996	Vasil Levski National Stadium	20,000	1–0	Mihtarski 69'	–
1996–97	04–05–1997	Vasil Levski National Stadium	40,000	0–2	–	Andonov 68' (pen.), 85'	04–11–1996	Vasil Levski National Stadium	40,000	1–1	D. Ivanov 45'	Zaytsev 8'
1997–98	10–04–1998	Vasil Levski National Stadium	30,000	3–3	N. Todorov 26'; Donev 30'; Z. Sirakov 66'	Genchev 8', 12'; M. Petkov 82' (pen.)	24–10–1997	Vasil Levski National Stadium	22,000	0–1	–	G. A. Ivanov 84'
1998–99	16–08–1998	Vasil Levski National Stadium	36,000	2–0	G. A. Ivanov 12'; Donev 71'	–	06–03–1999	Ovcha Kupel Stadium	27,000	2–3	M. Petkov 8' (pen.); Bukarev 83'	G. A. Ivanov 27', 61'; A. Aleksandrov 69'
1999–00	13–05–2000	Georgi Asparuhov Stadium	25,000	1–0	G. A. Ivanov 90+1'	–	30–10–1999	Balgarska Armia Stadium	21,000	1–0	D. Ivanov 1'	–
2000–01	22–04–2001	Georgi Asparuhov Stadium	27,313	2–1	G. A. Ivanov 30'; Topuzakov 79'	Manchev 31'	15–10–2000	Balgarska Armia Stadium	22,000	1–1	Trenchev 47'	Tsykhmeystruk 46'
2001–02	30–09–2001	Georgi Asparuhov Stadium	18,000	2–0	Dragić 10'; G. A. Ivanov 53'	–	02–03–2002	Balgarska Armia Stadium	19,000	2–2	L. Penev 43'; Manchev 56'	G. A. Ivanov 64'; Chilikov 69'
2001–02	24–04–2002	Georgi Asparuhov Stadium	22,000	2–0	Simonović 55'; G. A. Ivanov 81'	–	26–05–2002	Balgarska Armia Stadium	8,000	1–0	Manchev 13'	–
2002–03	10–05–2003	Georgi Asparuhov Stadium	15,000	1–1	T. Kolev 50'	Brito 62'	26–10–2002	Balgarska Armia Stadium	15,000	3–0	Mukasi 11', 55'; S. Petrov 45'	–
2003–04	31–10–2003	Georgi Asparuhov Stadium	16,000	1–1	T. Kolev 54'	Gargorov 53'	24–04–2004	Balgarska Armia Stadium	18,000	1–2	H. Yanev 64'	Temile 85'; Chilikov 90'
2004–05	23–04–2005	Vasil Levski National Stadium	17,123	0–1	–	H. Yanev 75' (pen.)	17–10–2004	Vasil Levski National Stadium	13,501	2–2	Sakaliev 10'; H. Yanev 45' (pen.)	Telkiyski 52'; Borimirov 59'
2005–06	11–09–2005	Vasil Levski National Stadium	13,290	1–1	Telkiyski 38'	V. Dimitrov 33'	02–04–2006	Vasil Levski National Stadium	15,846	0–1	–	G. A. Ivanov 59' (pen.)
2006–07	17–09–2006	Vasil Levski National Stadium	11,432	1–0	Bardon 48' (pen.)	–	07–04–2007	Vasil Levski National Stadium	20,000	0–1	–	Yovov 19'
2007–08	02–12–2007	Vasil Levski National Stadium	15,000	0–1	–	Machado 13'	10–05–2008	Balgarska Armia Stadium	18,000	1–1	V. Dimitrov 55' (pen.)	Krastovchev 43'
2008–09	01–11–2008	Vasil Levski National Stadium	17,420	1–1	G. A. Ivanov 66'	Lazarov 59' (pen.)	09–05–2009	Vasil Levski National Stadium	25,000	0–2	–	G. Hristov 36'; Soares 58'
2009–10	27–03–2010	Vasil Levski National Stadium	12,710	0–0	–	–	20–09–2009	Vasil Levski National Stadium	16,790	2–0	I. Stoyanov 15'; K. Stoyanov 65'	–
2010–11	26–02–2011	Georgi Asparuhov Stadium	17,480	1–3	K. Stoyanov 74' (o.g.)	Platini 33', 48'; Popov 65'	01–08–2010	Vasil Levski National Stadium	12,250	0–1	–	Dembélé 39'
2011–12	29–04–2012	Vasil Levski National Stadium	15,000	1–0	Ramos 49'	–	28–10–2011	Vasil Levski National Stadium	8,970	1–0	Zicu 25'	–
2012–13	27–04–2013	Vasil Levski National Stadium	24,140	2–1	Yovov 40'; J. Silva 90'	Marcinho 70'	20–10–2012	Vasil Levski National Stadium	17,340	1–0	Nyuiadzi 46'	–
2013–14	08–03–2014	Vasil Levski National Stadium	9,920	0–1	–	Gargorov 69' (pen.)	19–10–2013	Vasil Levski National Stadium	13,950	3–0	Milisavljević 31'; Popov 35'; Gargorov 37'	–
2013–14	21–04–2014	Vasil Levski National Stadium	8,650	1–3	R. Tsonev 81'	Kossoko 58'; I. Stoyanov 86'; Marković 90+6'	15–03–2014	Vasil Levski National Stadium	10,060	1–0	Krachunov 90+3'	–
2014–15	25–10–2014	Vasil Levski National Stadium	8,900	0–3	–	T. Silva 22'; Buș 45+4'; Galchev 85'	27–07–2014	Vasil Levski National Stadium	11,420	2–0	Karachanakov 47'; Buș 55'	–
2016–17	04−03−2017	Vasil Levski National Stadium	17,992	2–1	Procházka 71' (pen.); Jablonský 78'	Arsénio 5'	15–10–2016	Vasil Levski National Stadium	21,000	1–1	P. Yordanov 77' (pen.)	Narh 34'
2016–17	29−04−2017	Vasil Levski National Stadium	11,200	0–3	–	Arsénio 2'; Despodov 6'; Karanga 53'	28−05−2017	Vasil Levski National Stadium	13,600	3–0	Simão 1', 82'; Culma 67'	–
2017–18	21–10–2017	Vasil Levski National Stadium	25,107	2–2	Jablonský 8'; Procházka 61'	Tiago 12', 15'	18–03–2018	Vasil Levski National Stadium	16,500	1–0	Karanga 84'	–
2017–18	15−05−2018	Vasil Levski National Stadium	7,900	2–3	Paulinho 34'; S. Kostov 78'	Henrique 19'; Malinov 57'; Pinto 90'	18−04−2018	Vasil Levski National Stadium	12,000	2–2	Karanga 6' (pen.); Henrique 9'	I. Goranov 48'; Paulinho 61'
2018–19	24–02–2019	Vasil Levski National Stadium	11,000	1–0	Pereira 45+2' (o.g.)	–	29–09–2018	Vasil Levski National Stadium	23,000	0–1	–	Černiauskas 30' (o.g.)
2018–19	21−05−2019	Vasil Levski National Stadium	11,200	0–2	–	Tiago 70'; Evandro 86'	20−04−2019	Vasil Levski National Stadium	15,900	0–0	–	–
2019–20	15–02–2020	Vasil Levski National Stadium	24,687	0–0	–	–	01–09–2019	Vasil Levski National Stadium	14,200	2–2	Evandro 74'; Albentosa 88'	S. Ivanov 12'; Robertha 18'
2019–20							20–06–2020	Vasil Levski National Stadium	14,000	3–3	Kargas 16' (o.g.); Carey 58' (pen.); Sowe 88'	I. Goranov 35' (pen.); Thiam 45+2'; Slavchev 62'
2020–21	25–04–2021	Vasil Levski National Stadium	4,000	0–2	–	Keita 14'; Caicedo 37'	18–12–2020	Vasil Levski National Stadium	0	1–0	Sowe 20'	–
2021–22	06–03–2022	Vasil Levski National Stadium	19,000	0–0	–	–	26–09–2021	Vasil Levski National Stadium	14,000	2–1	Carey 44'; Caicedo 65'	G. Milanov 28'
2021–22							17–04–2022	Vasil Levski National Stadium	15,500	0–0	–	–
2022–23	18–09–2022	Vasil Levski National Stadium	20,000	2–0	Stefanov 78'; Welton 81'	–	17–04–2023	Vasil Levski National Stadium	23,430	0–0	–	–
2022–23	07–06–2023	Vasil Levski National Stadium	17,233	0–2	–	Heintz 35'; Nazon 61'						
2023–24	07–04–2024	Vasil Levski National Stadium	25,556	0–2	–	Heintz 61'; Karanga 77'	07–10–2023	Vasil Levski National Stadium	31,000	1–1	Lindseth 49'	Ronaldo 43'
2023–24							27–04–2024	Vasil Levski National Stadium	11,948	3–1	Skarsem 25'; Lindseth 36'; Carreazo 45'	Fadiga 61'
2024–25	19–10–2024	Vasil Levski National Stadium	31,948	1–0	Makoun 86'	–	02–03–2025	Vasil Levski National Stadium	23,345	2–2	Pittas 40'; Panayotov 84'	Stefanov 90+5'; Aldair 90+13'
2025–26	08–11–2025	Vasil Levski National Stadium	20,000	0–1	–	Eto'o 76'	13–04–2026	Vasil Levski National Stadium	30,700	1–1	Godoy 90+4'	Perea 71'
2025–26	16−05–2026	Vasil Levski National Stadium	15,500	2–0	Perea 11'; Everton 74' (pen.)	–	25−04–2026	Vasil Levski National Stadium	25,762	1–3	Makoun 11' (o.g.)	Everton 42'; Bouras 45'; Soula 80'
2026–27	08−11–2026	Vasil Levski National Stadium	28,000	0–3	–	Ebong 9'; Pittas 15'; Gbamin 57'	18−04–2027	Vasil Levski National Stadium				

=== Bulgarian Cup and other ===
Season	Date	Match	Stadium	Attendance	Competition
1948	5 May 1948	Levski 1−0 CSKA	Yunak Stadium	12,000	Sofia First Division
1948	5 September 1948	Levski 2–1 CSKA	Yunak Stadium	30,000	Bulgarian Republic Championship final – 1st leg
1948	9 September 1948	CSKA 3–1 Levski	Yunak Stadium	30,000	Bulgarian Republic Championship final – 2nd leg
1949	8 May 1949	CSKA 1–1 (a.e.t.) Levski	Yunak Stadium	35,000	Bulgarian Cup final
1949	16 May 1949	Levski 2–2 (a.e.t.) CSKA	Yunak Stadium	35,000	Bulgarian Cup final – 1st replay
1949	17 May 1949	Levski 2–1 (a.e.t.) CSKA	Yunak Stadium	35,000	Bulgarian Cup final – 2nd replay
1949	8 December 1949	Levski 2–0 CSKA	Yunak Stadium	15,000	Sofia Qualification for Bulgarian Cup
1950	26 November 1950	Levski 1–1 (a.e.t.) CSKA	Balgarska Armiya Stadium	30,000	Bulgarian Cup final
1950	27 November 1950	CSKA 1–1 (a.e.t.) Levski	Balgarska Armiya Stadium	30,000	Bulgarian Cup final – 1st replay
1950	3 December 1950	Levski 1−0 (a.e.t.) CSKA	Balgarska Armiya Stadium	30,000	Bulgarian Cup final – 2nd replay
1950	24 December 1950	Levski 1–0 CSKA	Yunak Stadium	20,000	Joseph Stalin Birthday Cup – final
1951	3 November 1951	CSKA 3–0 Levski	Balgarska Armiya Stadium	25,000	Bulgarian Cup semi-final
1957	23 October 1957	Levski 2−0 (a.e.t.) CSKA	Vasil Levski National Stadium	50,000	Bulgarian Cup semi-final
1964–65	8 September 1965	CSKA 3–2 Levski	Slavia Stadium	30,000	Bulgarian Cup final
1968–69	30 April 1969	CSKA 2–1 Levski	Vasil Levski National Stadium	40,000	Bulgarian Cup final
1969–70	25 August 1970	Levski 2–1 CSKA	Vasil Levski National Stadium	46,000	Bulgarian Cup final
1970–71	14 April 1971	Levski 2–2 (a.e.t.) (5−4 p) CSKA	Vasil Levski National Stadium	50,000	Bulgarian Cup quarter-final
1973–74	10 August 1974	CSKA 2−1 (a.e.t.) Levski	Vasil Levski National Stadium	40,000	Bulgarian Cup final
1975–76	2 June 1976	Levski 4−3 (a.e.t.) CSKA	Vasil Levski National Stadium	65,000	Bulgarian Cup final
1978–79	4 April 1979	Levski 2–1 CSKA	Vasil Levski National Stadium	60,000	Bulgarian Cup semi-final
1980–81	10 June 1981	Levski 0–1 CSKA	Vasil Levski National Stadium	25,000	Bulgarian Cup final group
1980–81	29 July 1981	Levski 2–0 CSKA	Vasil Levski National Stadium	35,000	Cup 1300 Years Bulgaria semi-final
1981–82	16 June 1982	Levski 4–0 CSKA	Vasil Levski National Stadium	45,000	Bulgarian Cup final
1982–83	2 March 1983	Levski 1–1 (a.e.t.) (3−4 p) CSKA	Vasil Levski National Stadium	40,000	Soviet Army Cup quarter-final
1983–84	14 March 1984	CSKA 0–1 Levski	Vasil Levski National Stadium	28,000	Soviet Army Cup semi-final
1983–84	31 March 1984	CSKA 1–3 Levski	Vasil Levski National Stadium	25,000	Bulgarian Cup semi-final
1984–85	19 June 1985	CSKA 2–1 Levski	Vasil Levski National Stadium	35,000	Bulgarian Cup final
1985–86	27 April 1986	CSKA 1–2 Levski	Vasil Levski National Stadium	28,000	Bulgarian Cup final
1986–87	13 May 1987	CSKA 2–1 Levski	Vasil Levski National Stadium	40,000	Bulgarian Cup final
1987–88	13 February 1988	CSKA 0–3 Levski	Vasil Levski National Stadium	25,000	Soviet Army Cup round of 16
1987–88	11 May 1988	Levski 1–4 CSKA	Vasil Levski National Stadium	40,000	Bulgarian Cup final
1990–91	13 February 1991	CSKA 0–2 Levski	Tundzha Stadium – Yambol	20,000	Bulgarian Cup group stage
1995–96	21 February 1996	Levski 2–0 CSKA	Georgi Asparuhov Stadium	40,000	Bulgarian League Cup quarter-final
1995–96	3 April 1996	Levski 1–0 CSKA	Georgi Asparuhov Stadium	25,000	Bulgarian Cup semi-final, first leg
1995–96	17 April 1996	CSKA 2–4 Levski	Balgarska Armiya Stadium	25,000	Bulgarian Cup semi-final, second leg
1996–97	9 November 1996	CSKA 3–0 (awarded) Levski			Bulgarian League Cup quarter-final group
1996–97	11 December 1996	Levski 0–3 (awarded) CSKA			Bulgarian League Cup quarter-final group
1996–97	28 May 1997	CSKA 3–1 Levski	Vasil Levski National Stadium	18,500	Bulgarian Cup final
1997–98	13 May 1998	CSKA 0–5 Levski	Vasil Levski National Stadium	50,000	Bulgarian Cup final
1999–2000	22 March 2000	CSKA 0–1 Levski	Balgarska Armiya Stadium	17,000	Bulgarian Cup quarter-final, first leg
1999–2000	5 April 2000	Levski 3–1 CSKA	Georgi Asparuhov Stadium	27,000	Bulgarian Cup quarter-final, second leg
2001–02	15 May 2002	CSKA 1–3 Levski	Slavia Stadium	15,000	Bulgarian Cup final
2002–03	16 April 2003	CSKA 0–1 Levski	Balgarska Armiya Stadium	15,000	Bulgarian Cup semi-final, first leg
2002–03	3 May 2003	Levski 0–0 CSKA	Georgi Asparuhov Stadium	17,000	Bulgarian Cup semi-final, second leg
2004–05	25 May 2005	Levski 2–1 CSKA	Vasil Levski National Stadium	10,848	Bulgarian Cup final
2005–06	31 July 2005	CSKA 1–1 (a.e.t.) (1−3 p) Levski	Vasil Levski National Stadium	9,984	Bulgarian Supercup
2006–07	30 July 2006	Levski 0–0 (a.e.t.) (0−3 p) CSKA	Vasil Levski National Stadium	9,751	Bulgarian Supercup
2013–14	16 November 2013	CSKA 0–0 Levski	Vasil Levski National Stadium	11,670	Bulgarian Cup round of 16 – 1st leg
2013–14	19 December 2013	Levski 0–0 (a.e.t.) (7−6 p) CSKA	Vasil Levski National Stadium	8,540	Bulgarian Cup round of 16 – 2nd leg
2017–18	11 April 2018	CSKA 0–2 Levski	Vasil Levski National Stadium	20,000	Bulgarian Cup semi-final, first leg
2017–18	25 April 2018	Levski 2–2 CSKA	Vasil Levski National Stadium	24,000	Bulgarian Cup semi-final, second leg
2021–22	15 May 2022	CSKA 0–1 Levski	Vasil Levski National Stadium	40,600	Bulgarian Cup final
2026–27	9 September 2026	Levski 2–4 CSKA	Vasil Levski National Stadium	27,345	Bulgarian Supercup

== Trophies ==
National Competition	Levski Sofia	CSKA Sofia
A PFG / First League	27	31
Bulgarian Cup	26+1	22+1
Soviet Army Cup	3	4
Bulgarian Supercup	3	5
Total	60	63

== Head-to-head ranking in First League (1948–2026) ==
P.	49	50	51	52	53	54	55	56	57	58	59	60	61	62	63	64	65	66	67	68	69	70	71	72	73	74	75	76	77	78	79	80	81	82	83	84	85	86	87	88	89	90	91	92	93	94	95	96	97	98	99	00	01	02	03	04	05	06	07	08	09	10	11	12	13	14	15	16	17	18	19	20	21	22	23	24	25	26	27
1	1	1	1	1	1	1	1	1	1	1	1	1	1	1			1	1		1	1	1	1	1	1	1	1	1	1		1	1	1	1	1	1	1		1	1	1	1		1	1	1	1		1			1	1	1	1		1	1	1	1	1																	1	
2	2				2			2		2		2	2			2		2		2	2	2	2	2		2	2	2	2	2	2		2	2	2	2	2		2	2	2		2	2	2	2		2		2	2	2	2		2	2	2	2	2	2	2	2	2	2	2	2		2	2	2	2	2		2	2		2		
3			3						3		3			3	3				3											3		3																		3				3		3						3	3	3	3				3	3	3		3			3			
4		4															4								4													4				4							4																							4		4	4	4		4	
5				5		5	5												5																			5									5	5			5															5	5										5		
6															6																												6																																				
7																																																																			7												
8																																																																									8						
9																																																																															
10																																																																															
11																11																																																															
12																																																																															
13																																																																															
14																																																																															
15																																																																															
16																																																																															
17																																																																															
18																																																																															

• Total: CSKA with 46 higher finishes, Levski with 32 higher finishes (as of the end of the 2025–26 season).

== Statistics ==
=== Biggest wins ===
==== Levski wins ====
7–1 – 23 September 1994, A PFG
7–2 – 17 November 1968, A PFG
5–0 – 13 May 1998, Bulgarian Cup final
4–0 – 16 June 1982, Bulgarian Cup final

==== CSKA wins ====
5–0 – 23 September 1953, A PFG; 1 October 1989, A PFG
4–0 – 14 April 1957, A PFG

=== Most appearances ===
35 – Manol Manolov (CSKA)
32 – Stefan Bozhkov (CSKA)
31 – Emil Spasov (Levski)

=== Most goals ===
15 – Georgi Ivanov (Levski)
14 – Nasko Sirakov (Levski)
12 – Pavel Panov (Levski)
11 – Dimitar Milanov (CSKA)

=== Most goals in one match ===
9 – Levski 6–3 CSKA (15 July 1962, A PFG); CSKA 2–7 Levski (17 November 1968, A PFG)

=== Most red cards ===
3 – Vladimir Gadzhev (Levski)

=== Most yellow cards ===
11 – Todor Yanchev (CSKA)

=== Record attendances ===
Highest attendance: 70,000 – 11 March 1967, Vasil Levski National Stadium (final score Levski 1–1 CSKA) and 31 May 1969, Vasil Levski National Stadium (final score Levski 1–3 CSKA)
Lowest attendance: 8,000 – 18 November 1995, Vasil Levski National Stadium (final score Levski 3–1 CSKA) and 26 May 2002, Balgarska Armiya Stadium (final score CSKA 1–0 Levski)
