= 2001–02 A Group =

54th completed season of top-tier football league in Bulgaria

A Group
- Season: 2001–02
- Dates: 3 August 2001 – 30 May 2002
- Champions: Levski Sofia (23rd title)
- Relegated: Spartak Pleven; Belasitsa; Beroe
- Champions League: Levski
- UEFA Cup: CSKA; Litex
- Matches: 268
- Goals: 681 (2.54 per match)
- Top goalscorer: Vladimir Manchev (21 goals)

The 2001–02 A Group was the 54th season of the A Football Group, the top Bulgarian professional league for association football clubs, since its establishment in 1948.

Defending champions Levski Sofia won their third consecutive title, and 23rd title overall.

== Overview ==
The format of the league was changed from last season, with the intention of making the league more competitive. This resulted in the league being divided into two groups after the regular season. The top 6 teams from the regular season would continue in the championship round, while the bottom 8 teams would play in the relegation round. It was contested by 14 teams, and Levski Sofia won the championship.

== Teams ==
Fourteen teams competed in the league. The promoted teams from the 2000–01 B Group were Spartak Pleven (returning to the top flight after a three-year absence) and Marek Dupnitsa (returning after a nineteen-year absence). The league also included Lokomotiv Plovdiv and Belasitsa Petrich after mergers with Velbazhd Kyustendil and Hebar Pazardzhik respectively.

These teams replace Botev Plovdiv and Minyor Pernik, who were relegated at the end of the last season.

=== Stadiums and Locations ===
Location of teams in 2001–02 A Group
Sofia 2001–02 A Group football clubs

Team	Location	Stadium	Capacity
Belasitsa	Petrich	Tsar Samuil	9,500
Beroe	Stara Zagora	Beroe	22,500
Cherno More	Varna	Ticha	8,250
Chernomorets	Burgas	Chernomorets	22,000
CSKA	Sofia	Balgarska Armia	22,015
Levski	Sofia	Georgi Asparuhov	29,200
Litex	Lovech	Gradski	7,050
Lokomotiv	Plovdiv	Lokomotiv	24,000
Lokomotiv	Sofia	Lokomotiv	22,000
Marek	Dupnitsa	Bonchuk	16,050
Naftex	Burgas	Lazur	18,037
Slavia	Sofia	Slavia	32,000
Spartak	Pleven	Slavi Aleksiev	21,940
Spartak	Varna	Spartak	7,500

=== Personnel and kits ===
Team	Manager	Captain	Kit manufacturer	Shirt sponsor
Belasitsa	(Bulgaria) Mihail Valchev			Vitosha AD
Beroe	(Bulgaria) Venelin Sivriev	(Bulgaria) Vanyo Shishkov	(Germany) Erima	
Cherno More	(Bulgaria) Aleksandar Stankov	(Bulgaria) Ventsislav Marinov	(Bulgaria) BURGELOF	St. Elias
Chernomorets	(Bulgaria) Ivan Tsvetanov	(Bulgaria) Kostadin Dzhambazov		
CSKA Sofia	(Italy) Luigi Simoni	(Bulgaria) Georgi Antonov	(Italy) Lotto	—
Levski Sofia	(Federal Republic of Yugoslavia) Slavoljub Muslin	(Bulgaria) Stanimir Stoilov	(Italy) Diadora	Mobiltel
Lokomotiv Plovdiv	(Bulgaria) Dimitar Dimitrov		(Japan) Asics	VAI Holding
Lokomotiv Sofia	(Bulgaria) Emil Dimitrov		(Germany) Adidas	Delta-G
Litex	(Bulgaria) Ferario Spasov	(Bulgaria) Vitomir Vutov	(Japan) Asics	Litex Commerce
Marek	(Bulgaria) Dimitar Aleksiev	(Bulgaria) Velizar Dimitrov	(United States) Nike	
Naftex	(Bulgaria) Dimitar Stoychev	(Bulgaria) Stanimir Dimitrov	(Germany) Puma	Petrol AD
Slavia Sofia	(Federal Republic of Yugoslavia) Žarko Olarević	(Bulgaria) Veselin Vachev	(Germany) Adidas	Sofiyski Imoti
Spartak Pleven	(Bulgaria) Angel Stankov	(Bulgaria) Slavcho Pavlov	(Japan) Asics	VIS-2
Spartak Varna	(Bulgaria) Stefan Grozdanov	(Bulgaria) Valentin Stanchev		

=== Managerial changes ===
Team	Outgoing manager	Manner of departure	Date of vacancy	Position in table	Incoming manager	Date of appointment
Beroe	(Bulgaria) Tsvetomir Parvanov	Mutual consent	1 June 2001	Pre-season	(Bulgaria) Ivan Vutov	21 June 2001
Chernomorets	(Bulgaria) Nikolay Rusev	Mutual consent	1 June 2001	Pre-season	(Bulgaria) Mihail Valchev	22 June 2001
Marek Dupnitsa	(Bulgaria) Petar Zehtinski	Mutual consent	8 September 2001	12th	(Bulgaria) Yanko Dinkov	10 September 2001
Chernomorets	(Bulgaria) Mihail Valchev	Sacked	9 September 2001	14th	(Bulgaria) Ivan Tsvetanov	12 September 2001
Levski Sofia	(Federal Republic of Yugoslavia) Ljupko Petrović	Mutual consent	10 September 2001	1st	(Bulgaria) Georgi Todorov (caretaker)	10 September 2001
Slavia Sofia	(Bulgaria) Kiril Kachamanov	Sacked	25 September 2001	10th	(Federal Republic of Yugoslavia) Žarko Olarević	25 September 2001
Lokomotiv Sofia	(Bulgaria) Angel Kolev	Sacked	28 October 2001	9th	(Bulgaria) Emil Dimitrov	28 October 2001
CSKA Sofia	(Bulgaria) Asparuh Nikodimov	Sacked	4 December 2001	3rd	(Italy) Luigi Simoni	10 December 2001
Marek Dupnitsa	(Bulgaria) Yanko Dinkov	Mutual consent	2 January 2002	13th	(Bulgaria) Dimitar Aleksiev	2 January 2002
Levski Sofia	(Bulgaria) Georgi Todorov	End of caretaker tenure	3 January 2002	1st	(Germany) Rüdiger Abramczik	3 January 2002
Beroe	(Bulgaria) Ivan Vutov	Mutual consent	4 January 2002	14th	(Bulgaria) Tsvetomir Parvanov	4 January 2002
Levski Sofia	(Germany) Rüdiger Abramczik	Sacked	11 March 2002	1st	(Federal Republic of Yugoslavia) Slavoljub Muslin	17 March 2002
Beroe	(Bulgaria) Tsvetomir Parvanov	Sacked	12 March 2002	14th	(Bulgaria) Iliya Iliev	17 March 2002
Spartak Pleven	(Bulgaria) Velislav Vutsov	Mutual consent	12 March 2002	7th	(Bulgaria) Angel Stankov	18 March 2002
Belasitsa	(Bulgaria) Voyn Voynov	Sacked	12 May 2002	12th	(Bulgaria) Mihail Valchev	13 May 2002

== First stage ==
=== League standings ===
Pos	Team	Pld	W	D	L	GF	GA	GD	Pts	Qualification
1	Levski Sofia	26	20	5	1	58	21	+37	65	Qualification for championship group
2	Litex Lovech	26	16	7	3	50	27	+23	55	Qualification for championship group
3	Lokomotiv Plovdiv	26	16	5	5	42	23	+19	53	Qualification for championship group
4	CSKA Sofia	26	15	7	4	48	17	+31	52	Qualification for championship group
5	Naftex Burgas	26	12	6	8	35	25	+10	42	Qualification for championship group
6	Slavia Sofia	26	10	7	9	30	32	−2	37	Qualification for championship group
7	Spartak Pleven	26	10	3	13	40	44	−4	33	Qualification for relegation group
8	Lokomotiv Sofia	26	7	8	11	33	32	+1	29	Qualification for relegation group
9	Spartak Varna	26	5	11	10	29	39	−10	26	Qualification for relegation group
10	Chernomorets Burgas	26	7	5	14	24	54	−30	26	Qualification for relegation group
11	Marek	26	6	6	14	22	42	−20	24	Qualification for relegation group
12	Cherno More	26	6	6	14	28	36	−8	24	Qualification for relegation group
13	Belasitsa Petrich	26	6	5	15	21	35	−14	23	Qualification for relegation group
14	Beroe	26	3	5	18	13	46	−33	14	Qualification for relegation group

Source: A PFG (in Bulgarian)
Rules for classification: 1st points; 2nd head-to-head points; 3rd head-to-head goal difference; 4th head-to-head goals scored; 5th head-to-head away goals scored; 6th season goal difference; 7th season goals scored; 8th "sportsmanship" (R & Y cards); 9th draw.

=== Results ===
Home \ Away	BEL	BSZ	CHM	CHB	CSK	LEV	LIT	LPL	LSO	MAR	NAF	SLA	SPL	SPV
Belasitsa Petrich		1–0	1–1	3–0	0–0	0–2	0–1	0–2	2–1	0–1	2–1	2–1	2–1	0–0
Beroe	1–0		3–1	0–0	0–3 (Note: Match awarded after was not played after referee was beaten up ahead of the match.)	0–0	0–2	1–2	1–1	0–0	0–1	0–4	0–2	1–0
Cherno More	2–1	2–0		3–1	0–1	1–2	4–0	1–3	1–1	3–1	0–3	0–1	2–2	1–1
Chernomorets Burgas	3–0	3–0	1–0		0–0	1–2	0–2	2–2	0–0	1–0	3–2	0–0	1–0	2–1
CSKA Sofia	1–0	3–0	1–0	6–0		2–2	1–1	2–1	4–0	2–1	3–0	5–0	3–2	5–1
Levski Sofia	3–2	1–0	1–0	4–0	2–0		2–1	2–0	3–2	4–1	4–1	3–1	4–1	6–0
Litex Lovech	1–0	3–1	3–2	4–1	1–1	2–0		2–1	5–3	2–0	1–0	4–1	6–2	1–1
Lokomotiv Plovdiv	2–0	5–0	2–1	3–2	2–1	0–1	0–0		3–1	2–1	1–0	1–0	2–1	1–1
Lokomotiv Sofia	0–0	1–1	1–2	6–1	1–0	1–2	3–1	0–1		4–0	0–0	1–0	3–0	0–0
Marek	2–2	1–0	2–0	2–0	0–1	1–1	0–1	1–1	0–3		1–1	1–0	3–5	0–0
Naftex Burgas	1–0	2–0	1–0	4–1	1–0	1–1	1–1	1–2	2–0	3–1		1–0	0–1	4–1
Slavia Sofia	1–0	3–2	0–0	3–1	1–1	0–0	1–1	0–2	1–0	2–0	2–2		3–2	1–1
Spartak Pleven	3–2	2–1	3–1	4–0	0–0	2–4	0–0	1–0	2–0	0–1	0–2	1–2		2–0
Spartak Varna	4–1	3–1	0–0	3–0	1–2	1–2	2–4	1–1	0–0	4–1	0–0	1–2	2–1	

Source: todor66.com
Legend: Blue = home team win; Yellow = draw; Red = away team win.

== Championship group ==
=== Standings ===
Pos	Team	Pld	W	D	L	GF	GA	GD	Pts	Qualification
1	Levski Sofia (C)	36	27	7	2	77	27	+50	56	Qualification for Champions League second qualifying round
2	Litex Lovech	36	23	8	5	66	34	+32	50	Qualification for UEFA Cup qualifying round
3	CSKA Sofia	36	19	7	10	60	29	+31	38	Qualification for UEFA Cup qualifying round
4	Lokomotiv Plovdiv	36	18	6	12	48	41	+7	34	
5	Slavia Sofia	36	14	8	14	42	48	−6	32	
6	Naftex Burgas	36	14	9	13	44	40	+4	30	

Source: A PFG (in Bulgarian)
Rules for classification: 1st points; 2nd head-to-head points; 3rd head-to-head goal difference; 4th head-to-head goals scored; 5th head-to-head away goals scored; 6th season goal difference; 7th season goals scored; 8th "sportsmanship" (R & Y cards); 9th draw.
(C) Champions

=== Results ===
Home \ Away	CSK	LEV	LIT	LPL	NAF	SLA
CSKA Sofia		1–0	1–2	4–0	3–2	0–2
Levski Sofia	2–0		1–0	2–0	3–0	3–1
Litex Lovech	1–0	2–2		3–1	1–0	2–0
Lokomotiv Plovdiv	1–0	1–3	0–2		2–1	1–2
Naftex Burgas	1–0	1–1	0–2	0–0		2–2
Slavia Sofia	1–3	0–2	2–1	1–0	1–2	

Source: todor66.com
Legend: Blue = home team win; Yellow = draw; Red = away team win.

== Relegation group ==
=== Standings ===
Pos	Team	Pld	W	D	L	GF	GA	GD	Pts	Qualification or relegation
7	Marek	40	14	8	18	46	57	−11	38	Qualification for Intertoto Cup first round
8	Lokomotiv Sofia	40	14	9	17	49	48	+1	37	
9	Spartak Varna	40	12	13	15	50	51	−1	36	
10	Chernomorets Burgas	40	13	9	18	41	69	−28	35	
11	Cherno More	40	12	11	17	47	51	−4	35	
12	Spartak Pleven (R)	40	15	4	21	58	66	−8	33	Relegation to 2002–03 B Group
13	Belasitsa Petrich (R)	40	12	7	21	34	50	−16	32	Relegation to 2002–03 B Group
14	Beroe (R)	40	4	8	28	19	70	−51	13	Relegation to 2002–03 B Group

Source: A PFG (in Bulgarian)
Rules for classification: 1st points; 2nd head-to-head points; 3rd head-to-head goal difference; 4th head-to-head goals scored; 5th head-to-head away goals scored; 6th season goal difference; 7th season goals scored; 8th "sportsmanship" (R & Y cards); 9th draw.
(R) Relegated

=== Results ===
Home \ Away	BEL	BSZ	CHM	CHB	LSO	MAR	SPL	SPV
Belasitsa Petrich		3–1	1–0	2–0	0–1	0–2	3–2	2–1
Beroe	0–1		1–1	0–3	0–0	0–1	1–1	0–3
Cherno More	1–1	2–1		1–1	3–2	2–0	2–0	1–1
Chernomorets Burgas	0–0	2–0	2–0		2–0	2–4	1–0	1–1
Lokomotiv Sofia	1–0	1–0	1–2	0–1		2–1	3–0	1–0
Marek	2–0	3–0	1–1	1–1	3–1		3–1	1–0
Spartak Pleven	2–0	1–2	2–1	3–1	1–2	3–1		1–0
Spartak Varna	2–0	2–0	1–2	3–0	3–1	2–1	2–1	

Source: todor66.com
Legend: Blue = home team win; Yellow = draw; Red = away team win.

== Champions ==
Levski Sofia

Goalkeepers
1	(Bulgaria) Georgi Petkov	27	(0)
12	(Bulgaria) Georgi Sheytanov	1	(0)
27	(Bulgaria) Dimitar Ivankov	9	(0)

Defenders
2	(Bulgaria) Martin Stankov	15	(0)
3	(Bulgaria) Stanimir Stoilov	30	(0)
5	(Bulgaria) Georgi Markov*	16	(0)
11	(Bulgaria) Elin Topuzakov	26	(5)
13	(Bulgaria) Ivo Trenchev	19	(1)
14	(Bulgaria) Vladimir Ivanov	11	(0)
20	(Bulgaria) Stanislav Angelov	28	(5)
22	(Bulgaria) Ilian Stoyanov	25	(0)
23	(Bosnia and Herzegovina) Dalibor Dragić	24	(5)
26	(Bulgaria) Tsanko Tsvetanov	6	(0)
28	(Bulgaria) Bogomil Dyakov	1	(0)

Midfielders
4	(Bulgaria) Biser Ivanov	24	(1)
6	(Bulgaria) Stanislav Genchev	21	(3)
7	(Hungary) Péter Kabát	15	(5)
15	(Federal Republic of Yugoslavia) Saša Simonović	6	(3)
17	(Russia) Konstantin Golovskoy	20	(0)
18	(Trinidad and Tobago) Brent Rahim	11	(0)
21	(Bulgaria) Dimitar Telkiyski	30	(4)
25	(Bulgaria) Yordan Terziev*	4	(0)
30	(Bulgaria) Dimitar Krastev	3	(0)
	(Bulgaria) Asen Nikolov*	3	(0)
	(Brazil) William Batista*	1	(0)
	(Bulgaria) Svetoslav Barkanichkov*	2	(0)

Forwards
8	(Bulgaria) Georgi Bachev	18	(8)
9	(Bulgaria) Georgi Ivanov	19	(13)
10	(Hungary) István Ferenczi	4	(3)
16	(Bulgaria) Martin Kushev	15	(6)
19	(Bulgaria) Georgi Chilikov	27	(10)
24	(Federal Republic of Yugoslavia) Miodrag Pantelić	29	(4)
29	(Bulgaria) Dimitar Makriev	1	(0)
	(Brazil) Rogério Gaúcho*	8	(0)
	(Bulgaria) Todor Kolev*	2	(0)

Manager
(Federal Republic of Yugoslavia) Slavoljub Muslin

- Markov, Terziev, Nikolov, Batista, Barkanichkov, Gaucho and Kolev left the club during a season.

== Top scorers ==
Rank	Scorer	Club	Goals
1	(Bulgaria) Vladimir Manchev	CSKA Sofia	21
2	(Bulgaria) Todor Kolev	Spartak Pleven	18
3	(Bulgaria) Stoyko Sakaliev	Naftex Burgas	17
4	(Bulgaria) Stefan Yurukov	Litex Lovech	14
4	(Bulgaria) Metodi Stoynev	Lokomotiv Plovdiv	14
4	(Bulgaria) Boyko Velichkov	Lokomotiv Sofia	14
4	(Bulgaria) Velizar Dimitrov	Marek Dupnitsa	14
8	(Bulgaria) Georgi Ivanov	Levski Sofia	13
8	(Bulgaria) Zoran Janković	Litex Lovech	13
8	(Bulgaria) Martin Kushev	Slavia Sofia; Levski Sofia	13

== Attendances ==
#	Club	Average	Highest
1	Neftochimik	8,750	18,000
2	Lokomotiv Plovdiv	7,650	20,000
3	Levski	7,250	18,000
4	Marek	4,150	15,000
5	CSKA Sofia	4,111	18,000
6	Pleven	3,590	18,000
7	Beroe	3,547	9,000
8	Chernomorets	3,505	8,000
9	Lovech	3,094	6,000
10	Cherno More	3,028	8,500
11	Belasitsa	2,825	10,000
12	Lokomotiv Sofia	2,030	9,000
13	Slavia Sofia	1,850	8,000
14	Spartak Varna	1,565	7,000
