= 1978–79 A Group =

35th season of season of top-tier football league in Bulgaria

A Group
- Season: 1978–79
- Champions: Levski Sofia (14th title)
- Relegated: Akademik; Haskovo
- European Cup: Levski
- UEFA Cup: CSKA; Lokomotiv Sofia
- Matches played: 240
- Goals scored: 626 (2.61 per match)
- Top goalscorer: Rusi Gochev (19 goals)

The 1978–79 A Group was the 31st season of the A Football Group, the top Bulgarian professional league for association football clubs, since its establishment in 1948.

== Overview ==
It was contested by 16 teams, and Levski Sofia won the championship.

== League standings ==
| Pos | Team | Pld | W | D | L | GF | GA | GD | Pts | Qualification or relegation |
|---|---|---|---|---|---|---|---|---|---|---|
| 1 | Levski Sofia (C) | 30 | 18 | 7 | 5 | 54 | 29 | +25 | 43 | Qualification for European Cup first round |
| 2 | CSKA Sofia | 30 | 14 | 12 | 4 | 49 | 26 | +23 | 40 | Qualification for UEFA Cup first round |
| 3 | Lokomotiv Sofia | 30 | 14 | 9 | 7 | 35 | 22 | +13 | 37 | Qualification for UEFA Cup first round |
| 4 | Slavia Sofia | 30 | 16 | 4 | 10 | 52 | 33 | +19 | 36 | |
| 5 | Chernomorets Burgas | 30 | 13 | 8 | 9 | 45 | 43 | +2 | 34 | |
| 6 | Marek Dupnitsa | 30 | 13 | 7 | 10 | 42 | 39 | +3 | 33 | |
| 7 | Beroe Stara Zagora | 30 | 14 | 5 | 11 | 45 | 47 | −2 | 33 | Qualification for Cup Winners' Cup first round |
| 8 | Botev Plovdiv | 30 | 9 | 11 | 10 | 45 | 45 | 0 | 29 | |
| 9 | Pirin Blagoevgrad | 30 | 9 | 11 | 10 | 37 | 39 | −2 | 29 | |
| 10 | Cherno More Varna | 30 | 8 | 10 | 12 | 29 | 40 | −11 | 26 | |
| 11 | Spartak Pleven | 30 | 9 | 7 | 14 | 25 | 27 | −2 | 25 | |
| 12 | Botev Vratsa | 30 | 9 | 7 | 14 | 36 | 42 | −6 | 25 | |
| 13 | Sliven | 30 | 8 | 9 | 13 | 35 | 42 | −7 | 25 | |
| 14 | Lokomotiv Plovdiv | 30 | 10 | 4 | 16 | 35 | 43 | −8 | 24 | |
| 15 | Akademik Sofia (R) | 30 | 6 | 10 | 14 | 27 | 50 | −23 | 22 | Relegation to 1979–80 B Group |
| 16 | Haskovo (R) | 30 | 7 | 5 | 18 | 35 | 59 | −24 | 19 | Relegation to 1979–80 B Group |

Source: rsssf.com
(C) Champions; (R) Relegated

== Results ==
| Home \ Away | AKD | BSZ | BPD | BVR | CHM | CHB | CSK | HAS | LEV | LPL | LSO | MAR | PIR | SLA | SLI | SPL |
|---|---|---|---|---|---|---|---|---|---|---|---|---|---|---|---|---|
| Akademik Sofia | | 1–0 | 0–0 | 2–0 | 0–0 | 1–1 | 1–1 | 2–0 | 1–3 | 1–3 | 1–2 | 3–2 | 2–0 | 0–3 | 1–0 | 1–2 |
| Beroe Stara Zagora | 5–1 | | 3–3 | 2–0 | 2–1 | 2–3 | 0–2 | 2–1 | 1–1 | 1–0 | 1–0 | 3–0 | 4–3 | 3–2 | 2–1 | 0–0 |
| Botev Plovdiv | 2–2 | 4–2 | | 2–2 | 2–0 | 2–2 | 1–2 | 5–0 | 2–0 | 1–0 | 1–1 | 1–1 | 6–1 | 0–4 | 2–2 | 2–0 |
| Botev Vratsa | 1–1 | 0–0 | 3–1 | | 3–0 | 2–0 | 1–1 | 0–0 | 0–1 | 3–0 | 1–0 | 1–0 | 2–3 | 4–1 | 1–0 | 1–2 |
| Cherno More | 2–1 | 1–2 | 0–0 | 1–0 | | 0–0 | 0–0 | 1–1 | 3–1 | 4–1 | 1–2 | 3–2 | 0–0 | 0–2 | 1–0 | 2–1 |
| Chernomorets Burgas | 1–0 | 3–1 | 3–1 | 2–3 | 2–2 | | 2–1 | 2–1 | 0–0 | 1–0 | 1–0 | 4–0 | 1–1 | 1–0 | 1–2 | 1–0 |
| CSKA Sofia | 3–0 | 2–0 | 1–1 | 3–0 | 5–2 | 2–2 | | 4–1 | 2–1 | 0–0 | 1–2 | 2–0 | 1–0 | 0–0 | 2–0 | 2–1 |
| Haskovo | 0–0 | 2–3 | 1–0 | 3–2 | 2–0 | 1–2 | 1–2 | | 4–6 | 4–2 | 1–3 | 2–0 | 2–2 | 1–2 | 2–0 | 1–0 |
| Levski Sofia | 4–1 | 5–0 | 0–0 | 4–1 | 2–0 | 4–2 | 2–1 | 1–0 | | 3–0 | 1–0 | 2–0 | 2–1 | 0–2 | 3–1 | 2–1 |
| Lokomotiv Plovdiv | 3–1 | 2–1 | 4–0 | 3–1 | 2–0 | 1–3 | 1–1 | 1–1 | 0–1 | | 2–2 | 1–2 | 1–0 | 1–2 | 2–1 | 2–0 |
| Lokomotiv Sofia | 0–0 | 2–0 | 1–0 | 1–1 | 1–0 | 1–0 | 3–2 | 3–0 | 1–1 | 3–0 | | 1–1 | 0–0 | 3–1 | 0–0 | 1–0 |
| Marek Dupnitsa | 3–0 | 3–1 | 3–2 | 2–0 | 0–0 | 5–1 | 0–2 | 3–1 | 0–0 | 1–0 | 2–1 | | 0–0 | 2–1 | 4–1 | 2–0 |
| Pirin Blagoevgrad | 4–1 | 0–0 | 3–0 | 1–0 | 1–3 | 4–2 | 1–1 | 2–0 | 1–1 | 2–1 | 0–0 | 1–1 | | 1–2 | 2–0 | 1–0 |
| Slavia Sofia | 1–1 | 1–2 | 1–2 | 3–1 | 0–0 | 4–2 | 1–1 | 2–1 | 3–1 | 0–2 | 2–0 | 3–0 | 3–0 | | 4–0 | 1–0 |
| Sliven | 4–1 | 0–1 | 3–1 | 2–2 | 2–2 | 2–0 | 2–2 | 3–0 | 1–2 | 1–0 | 1–0 | 1–1 | 1–1 | 3–1 | | 1–1 |
| Spartak Pleven | 0–0 | 3–1 | 0–1 | 1–0 | 3–0 | 0–0 | 0–0 | 4–1 | 0–0 | 2–0 | 0–1 | 1–2 | 2–1 | 1–0 | 0–0 | |

Source: A PFG (in Bulgarian)
Legend: Blue = home team win; Yellow = draw; Red = away team win.

== Champions ==
Levski Sofia

Goalkeepers
| (Bulgaria) Stefan Staykov | 11 | (0) |
| (Bulgaria) Tomas Lafchis | 19 | (0) |

Defenders
| (Bulgaria) Nikolay Grancharov | 27 | (3) |
| (Bulgaria) Dimitar Enchev | 16 | (1) |
| (Bulgaria) Vladimir Nikolchev | 19 | (1) |
| (Bulgaria) Plamen Nikolov | 27 | (0) |
| (Bulgaria) Stefan Aladzhov | 26 | (0) |
| (Bulgaria) Ivan Tishanski | 13 | (0) |
| (Bulgaria) Valeri Grekov | 1 | (0) |

Midfielders
| (Bulgaria) Angel Stankov | 20 | (3) |
| (Bulgaria) Todor Barzov | 29 | (2) |
| (Bulgaria) Voyn Voynov | 20 | (4) |
| (Bulgaria) Yuliyan Kolev | 6 | (0) |
| (Bulgaria) Branimir Kochev | 12 | (0) |
| (Bulgaria) Krasimir Borisov | 18 | (1) |
| (Bulgaria) Emil Spasov | 21 | (2) |

Forwards
| (Bulgaria) Pavel Panov | 28 | (12) |
| (Bulgaria) Georgi Todorov | 7 | (1) |
| (Bulgaria) Anton Milkov | 8 | (3) |
| (Bulgaria) Yordan Yordanov | 19 | (7) |
| (Bulgaria) Rusi Gochev | 19 | (14) |

Manager
| (Bulgaria) Ivan Vutsov |

== Top scorers ==
| Rank | Scorer | Club | Goals |
|---|---|---|---|
| 1 | (Bulgaria) Rusi Gochev | Levski Sofia (5 goals for Chernomorets) | 19 |
| 2 | (Bulgaria) Chavdar Tsvetkov | Slavia Sofia | 18 |
| 3 | (Bulgaria) Spas Dzhevizov | CSKA Sofia | 15 |
| 4 | (Bulgaria) Andrey Zhelyazkov | Slavia Sofia | 13 |
| 4 | (Bulgaria) Ivan Petrov | Marek Dupnitsa | 13 |
| 6 | (Bulgaria) Atanas Mihaylov | Lokomotiv Sofia | 12 |
| 6 | (Bulgaria) Pavel Panov | Levski Sofia | 12 |
| 6 | (Bulgaria) Georgi Slavkov | Botev Plovdiv | 12 |
| 9 | (Bulgaria) Stoycho Mladenov | Beroe Stara Zagora | 11 |
| 9 | (Bulgaria) Alyosha Dimitrov | Akademik Sofia | 11 |
| 9 | (Bulgaria) Sasho Georgiev | Haskovo | 11 |
