= 2002 Bulgarian Cup final =

- Event: 2001–02 Bulgarian Cup
CSKA	Levski
A Group	A Group
1	3
- Date: 15 May 2002
- Venue: Stadion Slavia, Sofia
- Referee: Dimitar Dimitrov
- Attendance: 17,500

The 2002 Bulgarian Cup final was played at the Stadion Slavia in Sofia on 15 May 2002 and was contested between the sides of CSKA Sofia and Levski Sofia. The match was won by Levski Sofia.

== Match ==
=== Details ===
15 May 2002
18:00 EEST

CSKA Sofia	1–3	Levski Sofia
Dragić 31' (o.g.)		Golovskoy 47'; G. Ivanov 70'; Kabát 83'

Stadion Slavia, Sofia
Attendance: 17,500
Referee: Dimitar Dimitrov (Sofia)

CSKA	Levski

CSKA:
GK	12	(Federal Republic of Yugoslavia) Nenad Lukić (yellow card)
DF	2	(Bulgaria) Georgi Antonov (c)
DF	6	(Bulgaria) Aleksandar Tomash
DF	4	(Federal Republic of Yugoslavia) Mićo Vranješ (substituted off) 62'
DF	29	(Senegal) Ibrahima Gueye (substituted off) 55'
MF	5	(Bulgaria) Todor Yanchev
MF	14	(Bulgaria) Svetoslav Petrov
MF	17	(Malta) Stefan Giglio (yellow card)
MF	21	(Federal Republic of Yugoslavia) Jovan Veselinović (yellow card) (substituted off) 73'
FW	11	(Bulgaria) Vladimir Manchev
FW	28	(Colombia) Hámilton Ricard
Substitutes:
GK	1	(Bulgaria) Ivaylo Ivanov
FW	9	(Bulgaria) Asen Bukarev (substituted on) 73'
MF	10	(Bulgaria) Metodi Deyanov
DF	13	(Bulgaria) Yordan Varbanov (substituted on) 55'
MF	16	(Bulgaria) Rumen Kalchev
MF	24	(Bulgaria) Angel Stoykov
MF	27	(Bulgaria) Petar Zlatinov (substituted on) 62'
Manager:
(Italy) Luigi Simoni

Levski:
GK	1	(Bulgaria) Georgi Petkov (yellow card)
DF	11	(Bulgaria) Elin Topuzakov
DF	3	(Bulgaria) Stanimir Stoilov (c)
DF	22	(Bulgaria) Ilian Stoyanov (substituted off) 55'
DF	23	(Bosnia and Herzegovina) Dalibor Dragić
MF	4	(Bulgaria) Biser Ivanov
MF	15	(Federal Republic of Yugoslavia) Saša Simonović
MF	17	(Russia) Konstantin Golovskoy (substituted off) 75'
MF	20	(Bulgaria) Stanislav Angelov
FW	9	(Bulgaria) Georgi Ivanov
FW	24	(Federal Republic of Yugoslavia) Miodrag Pantelić (substituted off) 72'
Substitutes:
GK	30	(Bulgaria) Vihren Uzunov
DF	2	(Bulgaria) Vladimir Ivanov
DF	5	(Bulgaria) Georgi Markov (substituted on) 75'
MF	7	(Hungary) Péter Kabát (substituted on) 72'
FW	8	(Bulgaria) Martin Kushev
FW	19	(Bulgaria) Georgi Chilikov
MF	21	(Bulgaria) Dimitar Telkiyski (substituted on) 55'
Manager:
(Federal Republic of Yugoslavia) Slavoljub Muslin

== See also ==
- 2001–02 A Group
