= Parvanov (surname) =

Parvanov is a surname. Notable people with the surname include:

- Georgi Parvanov (born 1957), President of Bulgaria
- Parvan Parvanov (born 1951), Bulgarian judoka
- Tsvetomir Parvanov (born 1962), Bulgarian footballer
