= 1964–65 A Group =

21st season of top-tier football league in Bulgaria

A Group
- Season: 1964–65
- Champions: Levski Sofia (9th title)
- Relegated: Sliven; Akademik Sofia
- European Cup: Levski Sofia
- Inter-Cities Fairs Cup: Lokomotiv Plovdiv
- Matches: 240
- Goals: 615 (2.56 per match)
- Top goalscorer: Georgi Asparuhov (27 goals)

The 1964–65 A Group was the 17th season of the A Football Group, the top Bulgarian professional league for association football clubs, since its establishment in 1948.

== Overview ==
It was contested by 16 teams, and Levski Sofia won the league, breaking a 12-year period without a championship title.

== League standings ==
Pos	Team	Pld	W	D	L	GF	GA	GD	Pts	Qualification or relegation
1	Levski Sofia (C)	30	18	6	6	59	28	+31	42	Qualification for European Cup preliminary round
2	Lokomotiv Sofia	30	16	7	7	42	33	+9	39	
3	Slavia Sofia	30	11	13	6	45	33	+12	35	
4	CSKA Sofia	30	14	6	10	48	26	+22	34	Qualification for Cup Winners' Cup first round
5	Beroe Stara Zagora	30	10	11	9	48	41	+7	31	
6	Lokomotiv Plovdiv	30	12	6	12	43	40	+3	30	Invitation for Inter-Cities Fairs Cup first round
7	Spartak Pleven	30	10	10	10	30	47	−17	30	
8	Cherno More Varna	30	10	9	11	37	37	0	29	
9	Botev Vratsa	30	10	9	11	29	35	−6	29	
10	Spartak Plovdiv	30	11	6	13	42	42	0	28	
11	Spartak Sofia	30	9	10	11	32	34	−2	28	
12	Botev Plovdiv	30	9	9	12	40	49	−9	27	
13	Marek Dupnitsa	30	9	8	13	34	41	−7	26	
14	Dunav Ruse	30	9	8	13	28	41	−13	26	
15	Sliven (R)	30	9	7	14	29	40	−11	25	Relegation to 1965–66 B Group
16	Akademik Sofia (R)	30	7	7	16	29	48	−19	21	Relegation to 1965–66 B Group

Source: rsssf.com
(C) Champions; (R) Relegated

== Results ==
Home \ Away	AKD	BSZ	BPD	BVR	CHM	CSK	DUN	LEV	LPL	LSO	MAR	SLA	SLI	SPL	SPD	SSF
Akademik Sofia		3–1	0–1	1–0	1–1	0–3	1–0	0–4	2–0	1–3	2–1	2–1	1–5	3–0	2–3	0–2
Beroe Stara Zagora	2–1		2–0	4–1	2–2	2–3	1–1	1–1	1–1	3–1	5–2	1–1	1–0	1–1	1–1	2–0
Botev Plovdiv	1–1	1–3		0–0	5–1	2–0	4–2	4–3	0–2	0–1	3–1	0–0	2–1	0–0	1–1	1–1
Botev Vratsa	2–0	3–2	2–0		2–0	1–1	2–0	1–1	2–0	0–1	1–0	0–0	0–0	2–0	1–2	0–1
Cherno More	2–1	0–0	3–2	2–1		1–0	0–1	2–1	0–0	6–0	5–1	0–0	2–1	1–1	0–1	1–1
CSKA Sofia	1–0	1–1	4–0	0–1	1–2		5–1	0–3	3–2	1–0	2–1	1–2	3–0	9–0	1–0	3–0
Dunav Ruse	0–0	2–1	1–1	1–0	2–0	0–0		2–0	3–4	0–3	0–0	0–1	2–0	0–2	1–0	1–1
Levski Sofia	3–1	0–0	4–1	6–0	0–0	1–0	2–1		3–0	2–0	4–1	1–0	1–0	3–0	3–1	2–0
Lokomotiv Plovdiv	3–1	2–1	0–0	1–3	3–0	2–1	2–0	0–3		1–1	2–1	3–3	2–0	6–0	0–1	3–1
Lokomotiv Sofia	0–0	1–1	2–1	1–0	2–1	0–1	1–3	3–1	2–1		2–2	3–1	1–1	4–2	4–2	1–0
Marek Dupnitsa	1–0	3–1	2–2	4–0	1–1	0–0	0–0	3–0	1–0	0–1		1–2	1–0	1–1	2–1	1–1
Slavia Sofia	3–2	2–1	4–3	1–1	3–2	0–0	3–1	2–2	0–0	1–1	0–1		6–0	5–1	0–0	2–0
Sliven	0–0	2–1	0–2	1–1	1–0	0–2	4–1	0–1	2–1	0–2	2–0	2–1		1–1	1–1	1–0
Spartak Pleven	2–2	2–1	4–0	1–1	1–0	1–0	0–1	0–0	2–0	0–0	1–0	0–0	2–1		3–4	1–0
Spartak Plovdiv	2–0	1–2	1–2	1–1	1–2	2–1	3–1	4–2	1–2	1–0	0–1	3–0	1–2	0–1		1–3
Spartak Sofia	1–1	2–3	3–1	3–0	1–0	1–1	0–0	1–2	2–0	0–1	2–1	1–1	1–1	1–0	2–2	

Source: A PFG (in Bulgarian)
Legend: Blue = home team win; Yellow = draw; Red = away team win.

== Champions ==
Levski Sofia

Goalkeepers
(Bulgaria) Georgi Kamenski	1	(0)
(Bulgaria) Biser Mihaylov	16	(0)
(Bulgaria) Boris Aleksandrov	14	(0)
(Bulgaria) Aleksandar Bozhilov	4	(0)

Defenders
(Bulgaria) Ivan Zdravkov	25	(0)
(Bulgaria) Tenyu Botev	10	(0)
(Bulgaria) Malin Ivanov	15	(0)
(Bulgaria) Ivan Vutsov	25	(0)
(Bulgaria) Ivan Manolov	9	(0)
(Bulgaria) Georgi Zlatkov	23	(1)
(Bulgaria) Georgi Stoyanov	19	(0)

Midfielders
(Bulgaria) Aleksandar Manolov	10	(1)
(Bulgaria) Toncho Prodanov	2	(0)
(Bulgaria) Georgi Georgiev	28	(0)
(Bulgaria) Kostadin Radev	7	(0)
(Bulgaria) Stefan Abadzhiev	10	(1)

Forwards
(Bulgaria) Georgi Sokolov	17	(8)
(Bulgaria) Lyuben Gaydarov	5	(0)
(Bulgaria) Georgi Asparuhov	29	(27)
(Bulgaria) Aleksandar Kostov	30	(3)
(Bulgaria) Hristo Iliev	28	(10)
(Bulgaria) Nikola Skarlatov	1	(0)
(Bulgaria) Aleksandar Borisov	3	(0)
(Bulgaria) Simeon Nikolov	20	(7)
(Bulgaria) Dimitar Yordanov	4	(0)

Manager
(Czechoslovakia) Rudolf Vytlačil

== Top scorers ==
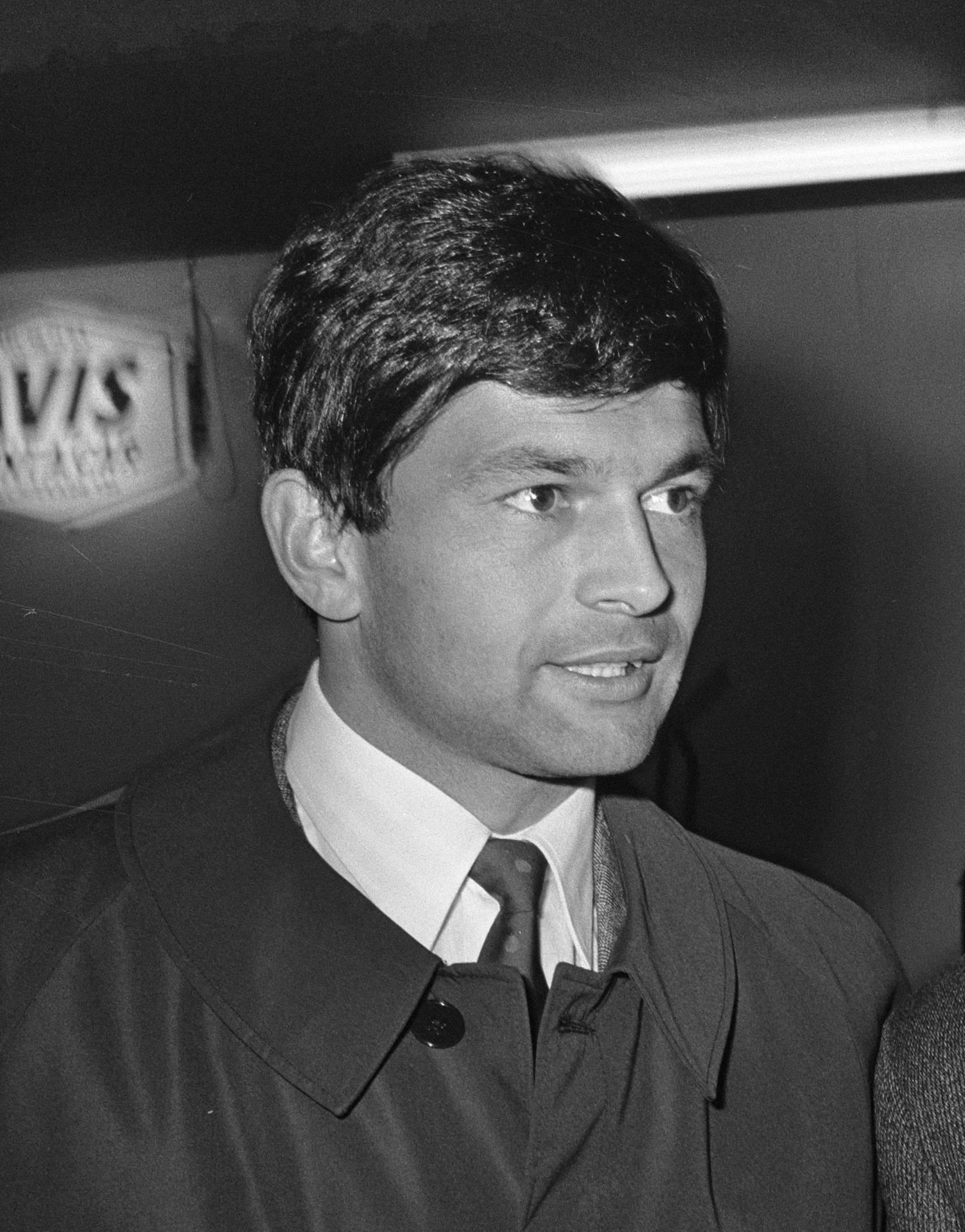
Georgi Asparuhov - top scorer of the 1964–65 season

Rank	Scorer	Club	Goals
1	(Bulgaria) Georgi Asparuhov	Levski Sofia	27
2	(Bulgaria) Traycho Spasov	Marek Dupnitsa	21
3	(Bulgaria) Petar Zhekov	Beroe Stara Zagora	18
4	(Bulgaria) Hristo Dishkov	Spartak Plovdiv	17
4	(Bulgaria) Ivan Kanchev	Lokomotiv Plovdiv	17
6	(Bulgaria) Nikola Yordanov	Dunav Ruse	16
7	(Bulgaria) Aleksandar Vasilev	Slavia Sofia	15
7	(Bulgaria) Nikola Tsanev	CSKA Sofia	15
