= Miodrag Pantelić =

Serbian footballer

Personal information
- Full name: Miodrag Pantelić
- Date of birth: September 4, 1973 (age 53)
- Place of birth: Novi Kozarci, SFR Yugoslavia
- Height: 1.72 m (5 ft 8 in)
- Position: Forward

Youth career
- Sloboda Novi Kozarci
- Kikinda

Senior career*
| Years | Team | Apps | (Gls) |
| 1992–1996 | Vojvodina | 89 | (32) |
| 1996–2000 | Red Star | 104 | (18) |
| 2000 | Dalian Shide | 26 | (9) |
| 2000–2003 | Levski Sofia | 54 | (6) |
| 2003–2004 | Sichuan Guancheng | 45 | (7) |
| 2005–2006 | Dalian Shide | 49 | (8) |
| 2006–2007 | Vojvodina | 9 | (2) |
| 2007 | Beijing Guoan | 16 | (1) |
| 2007–2009 | Vojvodina | 34 | (1) |
| Total | | 436 | (97) |

International career
| 1995 | FR Yugoslavia | 4 | (0) |
| 1995 | FR Yugoslavia XI | 1 | (0) |

Managerial career
- 2009–2012: Vojvodina (sporting director)
- 2018: Zvijezda 09
- 2018: Cement Beočin
- 2019: OFK Bačka (assistant)
- * Club domestic league appearances and goals

Miodrag Pantelić (Serbian Cyrillic: Миодраг Пантелић, pronounced [mîodraɡ pǎntelitɕ, - pantěliːtɕ]; born September 4, 1973) is a former Serbian football player.

== Career ==
Pantelić begin playing for Sloboda Novi Kozarci, then was moved to Kikinda, and continued his career playing for Serbian Vojvodina and Red Star Belgrade, Bulgarian Levski Sofia and Chinese Dalian Shide and Beijing Guoan. He ended his career at the end of 2008-09 season.

== International career ==
For the FR Yugoslavia national team, Pantelić made his unofficial debut in a January 1995 Carlsberg Cup against a Hongkong XI and was capped a further 4 times.

== Style of play ==
During his playing career, Pantelić was known for his skillful dribbling and play-making ability.

== Honours ==
=== Player ===
Red Star Belgrade

- First League of FR Yugoslavia: 1999–00
- FR Yugoslavia Cup: 1995–96, 1996–97, 1998–99, 1999–00

Dalian Shide

- Chinese Jia-A League/Chinese Super League: 2000, 2005
- Chinese FA Cup: 2005

Levski Sofia

- Bulgarian First League: 2000–01, 2001–02
- Bulgarian Cup: 2001–02

=== Manager ===
Zvijezda 09

- First League of RS: 2017–18
