= Biser Mihaylov =

Bulgarian footballer (1943–2020)

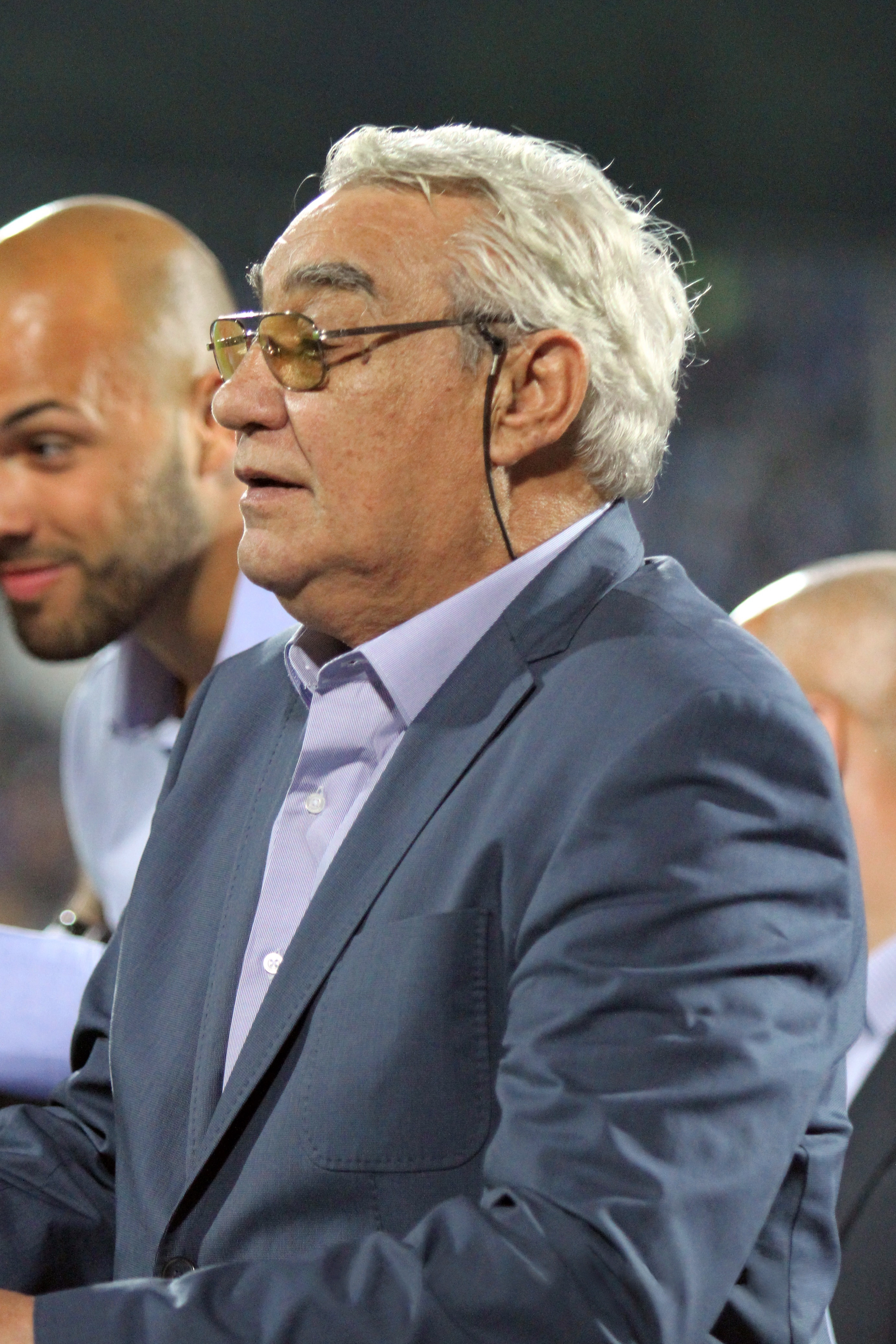
- Mihaylov in 2014

Personal information
- Date of birth: 30 June 1943
- Place of birth: Sofia, Kingdom of Bulgaria
- Date of death: 12 August 2020 (aged 77)
- Place of death: Sofia, Bulgaria
- Position: Goalkeeper

Senior career*
Years	Team	Apps	(Gls)
1961–1975	Levski Sofia	226	(0)

International career
1962–1971	Bulgaria	5	(0)
- * Club domestic league appearances and goals

Biser Mihaylov (Bulgarian: Бисер Михайлов; 30 June 1943 – 12 August 2020) was a Bulgarian footballer who played as a goalkeeper. He spent all 14 seasons of his career at Levski Sofia, before retiring at the age of 32 in 1975.

== Biography ==
Biser Mihaylov was born in Sofia. His son, Borislav, also a goalkeeper, once held the record for the most caps for the Bulgarian national team (now second behind Stiliyan Petrov). Mihaylov's grandson, Nikolay, also a goalkeeper, who played for Levski Sofia and the Bulgarian national team.

== Honours ==
Levski Sofia

- A Group: 1964–65, 1967–68, 1969–70, 1973–74
- Bulgarian Cup: 1967, 1971

== See also ==
- List of one-club men in association football
