= 1967–68 A Group =

24th season of top-tier football league in Bulgaria

A Group
- Season: 1967–68
- Champions: Levski Sofia (10th title)
- Relegated: Sliven; Maritsa
- European Cup: Levski
- Inter-Cities Fairs Cup: Slavia; Botev Plovdiv
- Matches: 240
- Goals: 760 (3.17 per match)
- Top goalscorer: Petar Zhekov (31 goals)

The 1967–68 A Group was the 20th season of the A Football Group, the top Bulgarian professional league for association football clubs, since its establishment in 1948.

== Overview ==
It was contested by 16 teams, and Levski Sofia won the championship.

== League standings ==
Pos	Team	Pld	W	D	L	GF	GA	GD	Pts	Qualification or relegation
1	Levski Sofia (C)	30	18	9	3	61	29	+32	45	Qualification for European Cup first round
2	CSKA Sofia	30	18	6	6	63	27	+36	42	
3	Lokomotiv Sofia	30	18	4	8	65	40	+25	40	
4	Spartak Sofia	30	16	6	8	49	38	+11	38	
5	Slavia Sofia	30	13	8	9	49	41	+8	34	Invitation for Inter-Cities Fairs Cup first round
6	Trakia Plovdiv	30	10	10	10	52	49	+3	30	Invitation for Inter-Cities Fairs Cup first round
7	Minyor Pernik	30	11	6	13	39	59	−20	28	
8	Botev Vratsa	30	11	5	14	55	40	+15	27	
9	Lokomotiv Plovdiv	30	11	5	14	47	42	+5	27	
10	Beroe Stara Zagora	30	12	3	15	56	57	−1	27	
11	Cherno More Varna	30	10	6	14	43	43	0	26	
12	Dobrudzha Dobrich	30	8	9	13	36	50	−14	25	
13	Spartak Pleven	30	9	7	14	43	61	−18	25	
14	Chernomorets Burgas	30	9	7	14	35	53	−18	25	
15	Sliven (R)	30	9	6	15	38	57	−19	24	Relegation to 1968–69 B Group
16	Maritsa Plovdiv (R)	30	6	5	19	29	74	−45	17	Relegation to 1968–69 B Group

Source: rsssf.com
(C) Champions; (R) Relegated

== Results ==
Home \ Away	BSZ	BPD	BVR	CHM	CHB	CSK	DOB	LEV	LPL	LSO	MPL	MIN	SLA	SLI	SPL	SSF
Beroe Stara Zagora		1–2	3–1	3–2	4–1	4–3	2–3	1–1	2–0	3–0	6–2	6–1	1–0	3–0	6–4	0–0
Botev Plovdiv	3–0		1–0	1–1	4–2	2–2	2–2	2–1	1–0	2–3	3–3	5–1	1–1	5–0	1–2	3–3
Botev Vratsa	4–2	1–1		3–0	5–2	1–2	5–0	2–2	5–0	1–2	2–0	5–0	4–1	4–0	0–1	1–0
Cherno More	2–0	0–0	1–0		1–2	2–3	2–2	2–3	2–1	0–0	1–0	4–2	1–1	2–0	6–2	0–1
Chernomorets Burgas	0–4	1–0	1–0	1–0		2–4	3–0	2–3	2–1	3–1	1–1	2–0	1–2	0–0	2–0	0–0
CSKA Sofia	3–0	4–1	4–0	2–0	2–1		2–0	0–0	1–0	1–2	8–0	2–1	1–1	4–0	3–0	2–0
Dobrudzha Dobrich	3–0	0–1	1–1	0–1	3–1	2–1		2–2	1–0	0–0	1–0	2–0	0–1	0–4	1–1	1–1
Levski Sofia	3–1	4–0	1–0	2–0	2–0	1–1	2–0		1–1	0–1	5–0	2–1	1–1	2–1	5–0	2–0
Lokomotiv Plovdiv	6–0	1–2	0–0	5–1	2–0	2–0	3–1	1–3		4–1	0–2	1–1	2–3	5–2	3–1	2–0
Lokomotiv Sofia	2–1	3–1	3–3	3–2	6–0	2–1	4–2	3–1	3–0		1–0	7–0	0–1	5–1	3–1	1–2
Maritsa Plovdiv	1–1	4–2	2–1	0–8	0–0	0–2	0–3	1–1	0–2	2–0		2–3	1–3	1–0	2–1	2–4
Minyor Pernik	1–0	2–1	3–2	1–1	1–0	0–0	3–2	1–1	0–0	2–2	3–1		2–0	2–1	3–0	0–1
Slavia Sofia	1–0	2–1	2–1	3–0	1–1	1–2	1–1	2–3	3–1	1–3	2–0	1–2		2–2	3–2	1–2
Sliven	2–0	2–1	1–2	1–0	1–1	0–2	1–1	1–2	1–0	2–1	3–1	4–2	1–1		1–0	1–2
Spartak Pleven	3–1	1–1	2–0	1–0	2–2	0–0	4–1	1–3	1–1	2–1	3–1	2–0	1–5	3–3		1–1
Spartak Sofia	3–1	2–2	2–1	0–1	3–1	2–1	2–1	1–2	2–3	1–2	4–0	2–1	3–2	3–2	2–1	

Source: A PFG (in Bulgarian)
Legend: Blue = home team win; Yellow = draw; Red = away team win.

== Champions ==
Levski Sofia

Goalkeepers
(Bulgaria) Georgi Kamenski	6	(0)
(Bulgaria) Biser Mihaylov	26	(0)
(Bulgaria) Boris Aleksandrov	7	(0)

Defenders
(Bulgaria) Ivan Zdravkov	24	(2)
(Bulgaria) Kiril Ivkov	28	(0)
(Bulgaria) Georgi Stoyanov	3	(0)
(Bulgaria) Ivan Vutsov	30	(0)
(Bulgaria) Stefan Aladzhov	17	(1)
(Bulgaria) Stoichko Peshev	29	(3)

Midfielders
(Bulgaria) Stefan Pavlov	4	(1)
(Bulgaria) Georgi Georgiev	18	(0)
(Bulgaria) Yanko Kirilov	25	(6)
(Bulgaria) Tsvetan Veselinov	20	(11)
(Bulgaria) Aleksandar Manolov	16	(0)
(Bulgaria) Stefan Abadzhiev	3	(0)

Forwards
(Bulgaria) Georgi Sokolov	28	(9)
(Bulgaria) Hristo Iliev	19	(7)
(Bulgaria) Georgi Asparuhov	25	(14)
(Bulgaria) Hristo Dzhordzhilov	5	(0)
(Bulgaria) Aleksandar Kostov	26	(5)
(Bulgaria) Bogomil Manov	1	(0)
(Bulgaria) Metodi Bonchev	3	(1)

Manager
(Bulgaria) Krastyo Chakarov

== Top scorers ==
Rank	Scorer	Club	Goals
1	(Bulgaria) Petar Zhekov	Beroe Stara Zagora	31
2	(Bulgaria) Nikola Kotkov	Lokomotiv Sofia	28
3	(Bulgaria) Georgi Kamenov	Botev Vratsa	21
4	(Bulgaria) Bozhidar Grigorov	Slavia Sofia	19
5	(Bulgaria) Mihail Gyonin	Spartak Sofia	16
5	(Bulgaria) Iliya Dragomirov	Botev Vratsa	16
7	(Bulgaria) Dimitar Marashliev	CSKA Sofia	15
8	(Bulgaria) Georgi Asparuhov	Levski Sofia	14
8	(Bulgaria) Georgi Manolov	Dobrudzha Dobrich	14
8	(Bulgaria) Dinko Dermendzhiev	Trakia Plovdiv	14
