= Rusi Gochev =

Bulgarian footballer

Personal information
- Full name: Rusi Gochev
- Date of birth: 9 March 1958 (age 68)
- Place of birth: Burgas, Bulgaria
- Position: Winger

Senior career*
Years	Team	Apps	(Gls)
1976–1979	Chernomorets Burgas	35	(12)
1979–1987	Levski Sofia	188	(58)
1987–1989	LASK Linz	13	(2)
Total		236	(72)

International career
1978–1986	Bulgaria	33	(3)
- * Club domestic league appearances and goals

Rusi Gochev (Bulgarian: Руси Гочев; born 9 March 1958) is a Bulgarian retired football winger.

During his club career, Gochev played for Chernomorets Burgas, Levski Sofia and LASK Linz. He also amassed 33 caps for the Bulgaria national team, scoring 3 goals.

From July to August 2011, Gochev was director of youth academy at Chernomorets Burgas. He has also worked in a similar capacity with Levski Sofia.

== Honours ==
=== Club ===
Levski Sofia

- A PFG (3): 1978–79, 1983–84, 1984–85
- Bulgarian Cup (3): 1978–79, 1983–84, 1985–86
