= Stefan Abadzhiev =

Bulgarian footballer (1934–2024)

Personal information
- Full name: Stefan Atanasov Abadzhiev
- Date of birth: 3 July 1934
- Place of birth: Osoitsa, Bulgaria
- Date of death: 13 March 2024 (aged 89)
- Place of death: Sofia, Bulgaria
- Height: 1.75 m (5 ft 9 in)
- Position: Attacking midfielder

Senior career*
Years	Team	Apps	(Gls)
1953–1968	Levski Sofia	254	(37)
1968–1970	Wiesbaden		

International career
1958–1966	Bulgaria	27	(1)

Managerial career
- 1975–1976: Borussia Neunkirchen
- 1982: FC Homburg
- * Club domestic league appearances and goals

Stefan Atanasov Abadzhiev (Bulgarian: Стефан Атанасов Абаджиев; 3 July 1934 – 13 March 2024) was a Bulgarian football forward who played for Bulgaria in the 1966 FIFA World Cup.

== Career ==
Abadzhiev played the majority of his club career for Levski Sofia, spending fifteen years at the club. With Levski, he won three league titles and four Bulgarian Cups. He also competed in the men's tournament at the 1960 Summer Olympics.

== Death ==
Abadzhiev died on 13 March 2024, at the age of 89.

== Honours ==
Levski Sofia

- A PFG: 1953, 1964–65, 1967–68
- Bulgarian Cup: 1956, 1957, 1958–59, 1966–67
