= 1982–83 Bulgarian Cup =

Tournament details
- Country: Bulgaria

Final positions
- Champions: CSKA Sofia (10th cup)
- Runners-up: Spartak Varna

Tournament statistics
- Top goal scorer(s): Emil Marinov (Botev Vratsa) (8 goals)

The 1982–83 Bulgarian Cup was the 43rd season of the Bulgarian Cup. CSKA Sofia won the competition, beating Spartak Varna 4–0 in the final at the Plovdiv Stadium.

== First round ==
Team 1	Agg.	Team 2	1st leg	2nd leg
Rodopa Smolyan	3–4	Belasitsa Petrich	2–1	1–3
Balkan Botevgrad	3–3 (a)	Neftochimic Burgas	3–1	0–2
Dunav Ruse	7–5	Botev Ihtiman	6–2	1–3
Dobrudzha Dobrich	4–7	Haskovo	3–1	1–6 (a.e.t.)
Yantra Gabrovo	3–2	Bdin Vidin	3–0	0–2
Chernolomets Popovo	1–7	Shumen	1–1	0–6
Rozova Dolina	4–2	Pirin Blagoevgrad	2–1	2–1
Beroe Stara Zagora	5–3	Etar Veliko Tarnovo	3–1	2–2
Botev Vratsa	12–4	Partizan Cherven Bryag	9–1	3–3
Sliven	12–1	Nesebar	8–0	4–1
Pirin Gotse Delchev	3–2	Minyor Pernik	2–0	1–2
Chirpan	0–5	Cherno More Varna	0–1	0–4
Litex Lovech	2–6	Akademik Svishtov	2–0	0–6
Lokomotiv Mezdra	3–1	Vihren Sandanski	3–1	0–0
Hebar Pazardzhik	6–2	Spartak Pleven	4–2	2–0
Tryavna	1–3	Akademik Sofia	0–1	1–2
Zagorets Nova Zagora	2–4	Ludogorets Razgrad	1–0	1–4
Asenovets Asenovgrad	3–1	Slivnishki Geroy	2–0	1–1
Beloslav	4–5	Lokomotiv GO	3–0	1–5
Rilski Sportist	6–1	Marek Dupnitsa	3–0	3–1
Dorostol Silistra	1–2	Chernomorets Burgas	1–0	0–2
Montana	0–2	Spartak Varna	0–0	0–2
Kaliakra Kavarna	1–2	Svetkavitsa	1–0	0–2
Botev Plovdiv	6–2	Lokomotiv Plovdiv	3–1	3–1

== Second round ==
Team 1	Agg.	Team 2	1st leg	2nd leg
Pirin Gotse Delchev	1–3	Botev Vratsa	1–1	0–2
Belasitsa Petrich	3–4	Akademik Sofia	3–1	0–3
Sliven	3–2	Dunav Ruse	3–1	0–1
Asenovets Asenovgrad	0–0 (3–2 p)	Shumen	0–0	0–0 (a.e.t.)
Cherno More Varna	4–1	Akademik Svishtov	4–0	0–1
Yantra Gabrovo	1–5	Ludogorets Razgrad	1–1	0–4
Botev Plovdiv	4–3	Beroe Stara Zagora	2–0	2–3
Lokomotiv Mezdra	2–3	Neftochimic Burgas	2–0	0–3
Lokomotiv GO	4–4 (a)	Rilski Sportist	3–0	1–4
Haskovo	1–3	Hebar Pazardzhik	1–1	0–2
Chernomorets Burgas	1–3	Spartak Varna	1–0	0–3
Rozova Dolina	3–1	Svetkavitsa	3–0	0–1

== Third round ==
In this round include the four teams, who participated in the European tournaments (CSKA, Levski, Slavia and Lokomotiv Sofia).

Team 1	Agg.	Team 2	1st leg	2nd leg
Botev Vratsa	4–1	Akademik Sofia	3–1	1–0
CSKA Sofia	3–2	Lokomotiv Sofia	3–2	0–0
Asenovets Asenovgrad	1–7	Sliven	1–5	0–2
Cherno More Varna	5–3	Ludogorets Razgrad	3–1	2–2
Botev Plovdiv	2–1	Slavia Sofia	2–0	0–1
Neftochimic Burgas	1–3	Levski Sofia	1–2	0–1
Lokomotiv GO	3–3 (1–4 p)	Hebar Pazardzhik	3–0	0–3 (5–4 p)
Rozova Dolina	2–4	Spartak Varna	2–0	0–4

== Quarter-finals ==
Team 1	Agg.	Team 2	1st leg	2nd leg
CSKA Sofia	4–2	Botev Vratsa	4–2	0–0
Cherno More Varna	2–2 (3–4 p)	Sliven	2–0	0–2 (a.e.t.)
Botev Plovdiv	1–4	Levski Sofia	1–1	0–3
Spartak Varna	4–3	Hebar Pazardzhik	4–1	0–2

== Semi-finals ==
Team 1	Score	Team 2	Place
Levski Sofia	0–1	Spartak Varna	Kazanlak
Sliven	1–3	CSKA Sofia	Plovdiv

== Final ==
=== Details ===
3 April 1983

CSKA Sofia	4−0	Spartak Varna
Yonchev 18', 20'; Markov 39'; Mladenov 55'

Plovdiv Stadium, Plovdiv
Attendance: 15,000
Referee: Bogdan Dochev (Sofia)

CSKA	Spartak
