= Plamen Nikolov (footballer, born 1957) =

Bulgarian footballer

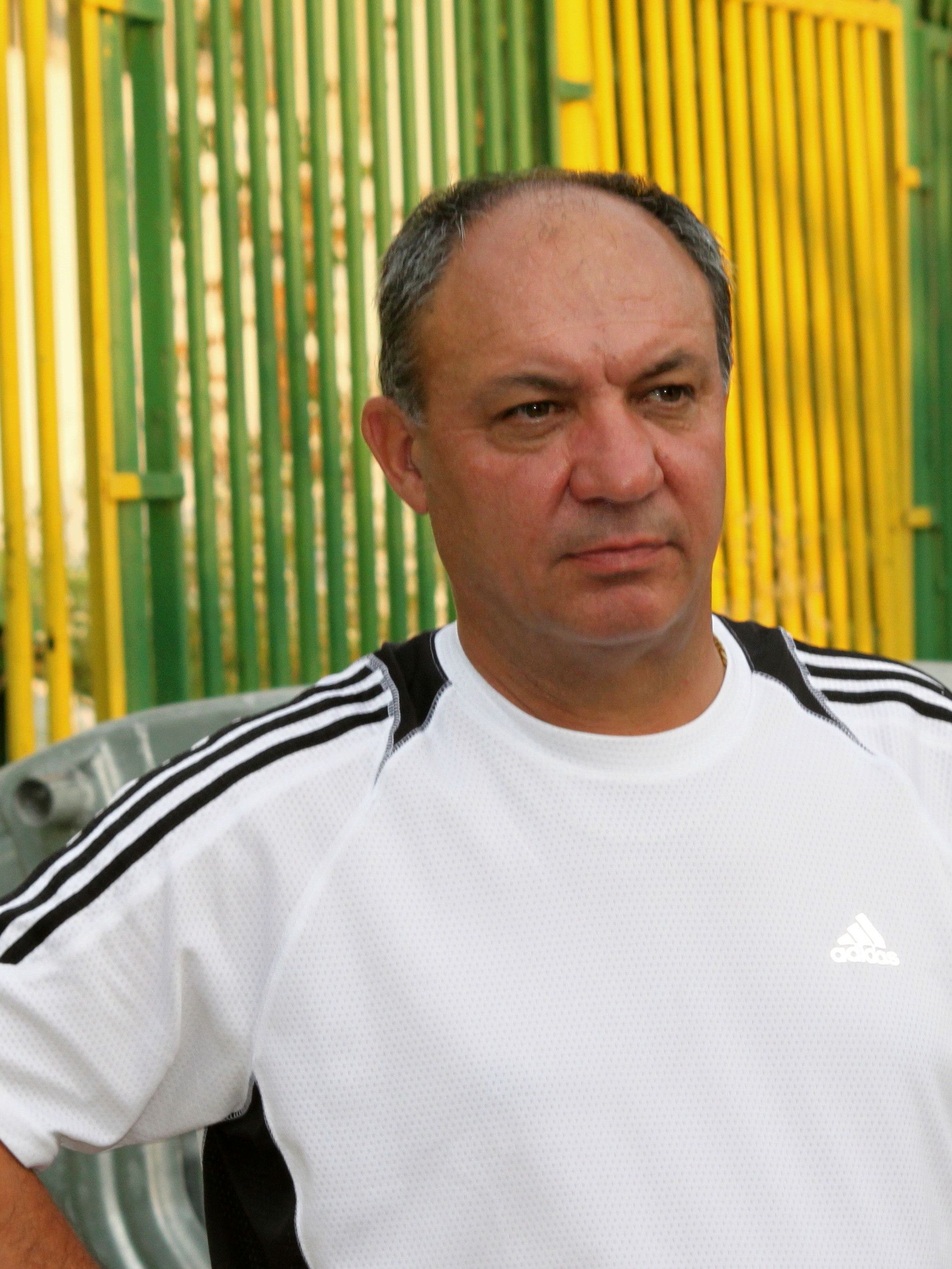

Personal information
- Full name: Plamen Ivanchev Nikolov
- Date of birth: 24 June 1957 (age 69)
- Place of birth: Pleven, Bulgaria
- Height: 1.82 m (5 ft 11 1/2 in)
- Position: Right back

Senior career*
Years	Team	Apps	(Gls)
1974–1977	Spartak Pleven	80	(0)
1977–1985	Levski Sofia	200	(6)
1986–1990	IK Brage	78	(1)
1986–1987	→ Antwerp (loan)	4	(0)
1988	→ Levski Sofia (loan)	17	(0)
1990–1992	Levski Sofia	7	(0)
Total		386	(7)

International career
1978–1988	Bulgaria	55	(1)
- * Club domestic league appearances and goals

Plamen Nikolov (Bulgarian: Пламен Николов; born 24 June 1957 in Pleven) is a Bulgarian former footballer who played as a defender.

== Club career ==
In his career Nikolov played mostly for PFC Levski Sofia. In 1984, he was named Bulgarian Footballer of the Year. He was a successful player in the Swedish top division when playing for IK Brage. Between the seasons in Sweden (where they play spring-fall) he was on loan to Antwerpen and Vitosha Levski. After his retirement, he worked as assistant manager of Levski Sofia as well as head coach of Spartak Pleven, Olympik Teteven and Botev Vratsa.

== International career ==
For Bulgaria, Nikolov was capped 55 times, making his debut on 22 February 1978 against Scotland.

== Honours ==
Levski Sofia

- Bulgarian A Group (4): 1978–79, 1983–84, 1984–85, 1987–88
- Bulgarian Cup (3): 1979, 1984, 1991

Individual

- Bulgarian Footballer of the Year: 1984
