= Nikola Hristov =

Bulgarian footballer (born 1951)

Personal information
- Full name: Nikola Hristov Kostov
- Date of birth: 28 May 1951 (age 75)
- Place of birth: Kriva Bara, Bulgaria
- Position: Forward

Senior career*
Years	Team	Apps	(Gls)
1969–1977	Dunav Ruse	206	(95)
1978–1980	CSKA Sofia	65	(23)
1980–1981	Dunav Ruse	36	(17)
1981–1982	Botev Vratsa	27	(5)

International career
1973–1976	Bulgaria	7	(1)

Managerial career
- 1991: Dunav Ruse
- 1994–1995: Lokomotiv Ruse
- 1995–1996: Spartak Varna
- 1999–2000: Dunav Ruse
- 2001: Dunav Ruse
- 2004: Dunav Ruse
- 2006–2007: Benkovski Byala
- 2007–2008: Dunav Ruse
- * Club domestic league appearances and goals

Nikola Hristov (Bulgarian: Никола Христов; born 28 May 1951) is a former Bulgarian footballer who played as a forward from 1969 to 1982, notably for Dunav Ruse, where he made over 240 league appearances for the club and scored over 110 goals.

He also played for CSKA Sofia and Botev Vratsa, as well as for the Bulgarian national team. Hristov made his Bulgaria debut in 1973 and went on to win 7 caps for the national side.

== Honours ==
CSKA Sofia

- Bulgarian League: 1979–80
