= Georgi Ivanov (footballer, born 1976) =

Bulgarian footballer

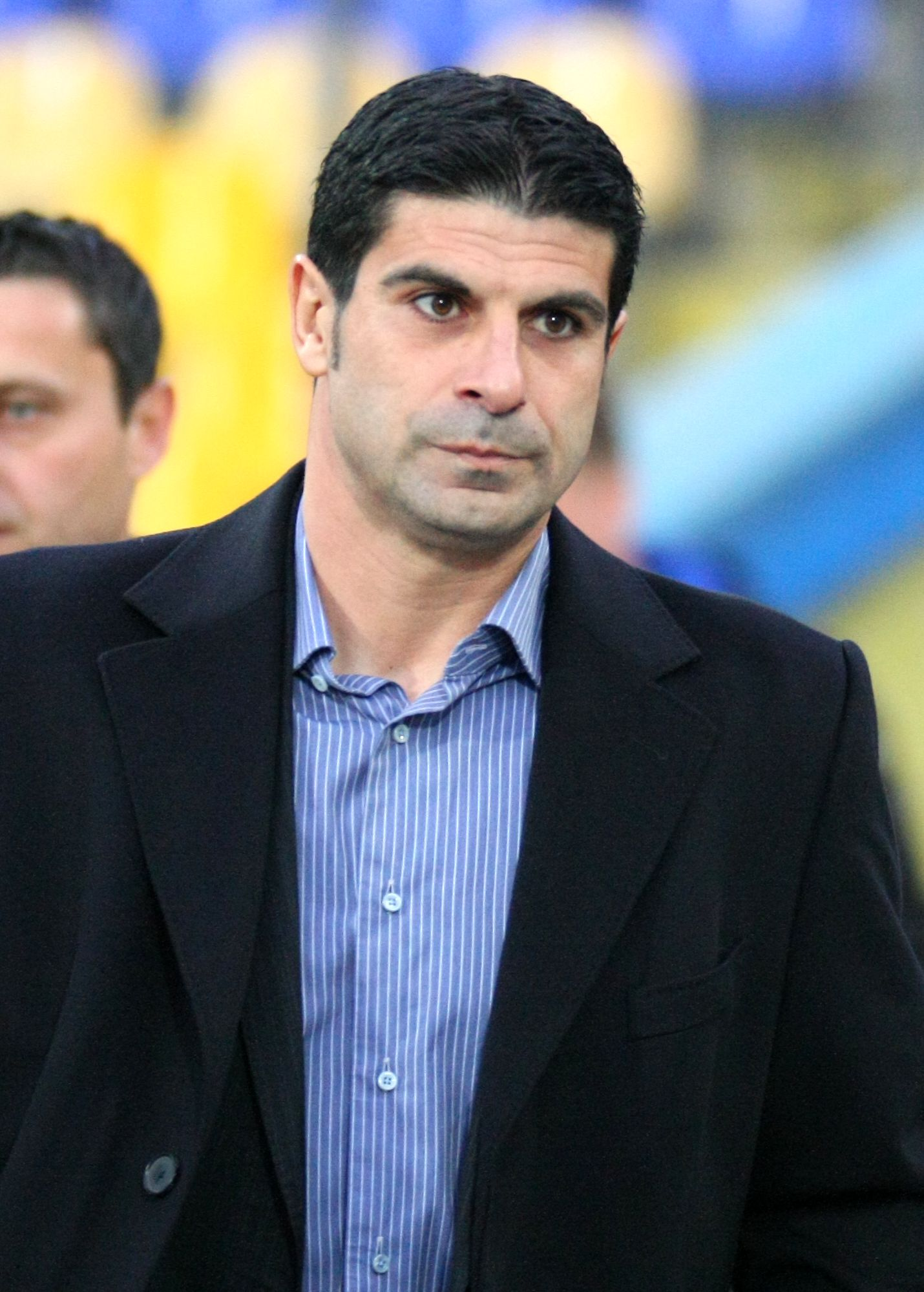
- Ivanov in 2014

President of the Bulgarian Football Union
- Incumbent
- Assumed office 15 March 2024
- Preceded by: Emil Kostadinov (interim)

Personal details
- Born: Georgi Aleksandrov Ivanov; 2 July 1976 (age 50) Plovdiv, Bulgaria
- Height: 6 ft 1 in (1.85 m)
- Occupation: Footballer; football administrator
Association football career
- Position: Forward
Senior career*
Years	Team	Apps	(Gls)
1992–1997	Lokomotiv Plovdiv	60	(15)
1997–2002	Levski Sofia	115	(70)
2002–2004	Rennes	15	(0)
2003–2004	→ Levski Sofia (loan)	21	(9)
2004–2005	Samsunspor	29	(4)
2005–2006	Gaziantepspor	13	(1)
2006	Levski Sofia	23	(14)
2007–2008	Rijeka	34	(6)
2008–2009	Levski Sofia	23	(12)
Total		330	(132)
International career
1996–2005	Bulgaria	34	(4)
Managerial career
- 2009–2010: Levski Sofia
- 2011: Levski Sofia
- 2012: Levski Sofia (interim)
- 2013–2014: Cherno More
- 2014: Levski Sofia
- 2016–2017: Cherno More
- 2022: Bulgaria (interim)
- * Club domestic league appearances and goals

Georgi Alexandrov Ivanov, nicknamed Gonzo (Bulgarian: Георги Александров Иванов – Гонзо; born 2 July 1976), is a Bulgarian former professional footballer and manager who is the current president of the Bulgarian Football Union. A forward, Ivanov is a former Bulgarian international and is perhaps best known for his time at Levski Sofia and his goalscoring prowess in the Eternal derby of Bulgarian football, netting 15 goals, having bettered Nasko Sirakov's record in 2008.

== Club career ==
=== Lokomotiv Plovdiv ===
Georgi Ivanov was born in Plovdiv and is of Romani descent. He started his career in his hometown Plovdiv playing for local club Lokomotiv Plovdiv. His talent soon became apparent, and he received several call-ups for the Bulgaria national team. For four seasons in Lokomotiv Plovdiv, Ivanov earned 60 appearances playing in the Bulgarian top division, scoring 15 goals.

=== Levski Sofia first period ===
"Gonzo", as he was known among the fans, signed for Levski Sofia in the summer of 1997. He is believed to have previously been twice on the radar of archrival CSKA Sofia, but then manager Georgi Vasilev deciding on both occasions against securing his services. On 24 October 1997, he played in his first Eternal Derby and scored the winning goal in the 84th minute after a Vladimir Ivanov assist to help the "bluemen" to a 1–0 victory. In total, Ivanov has participated in 22 editions of the rivalry, scoring a record-breaking 15 goals (the last time he found the net against the "redmen" was in an A PFG match held on 1 November 2008 that finished 1:1). Levski Sofia have only lost two derby matches against the "redmen" with Ivanov on the pitch.

=== Rennes ===
Ivanov joined French Ligue 1 side Rennes for a club record transfer fee of €4,100,000 in the summer of 2002. After featuring regularly under the management of Philippe Bergeroo, he saw his opportunities reduced following the former's sacking in October 2002 and the appointment of Vahid Halilhodžić. After less than a full year abroad Ivanov rejoined Levski on loan.

=== Levski Sofia second period ===
During the 2003–04 season, Ivanov played for Levski Sofia again out on loan. He made 21 league appearances and scored nine goals.

=== Turkish period ===
Between 2004 and 2006, Ivanov played in Turkey for Samsunspor and Gaziantepspor.

=== Levski Sofia third period ===
Ivanov once again rejoined Levski Sofia on a free transfer from Gaziantepspor in 2006 and won the Bulgarian title for the fourth time in his career.

=== NK Rijeka ===
In January 2007, Ivanov was transferred to Croatian club NK Rijeka. In Croatia, Ivanov was used as a striker and as a defensive midfielder.

=== Levski Sofia fourth period ===
On 22 June 2008, Ivanov signed a contract with Levski Sofia for the fourth time. Towards the end of the first half of the season he scored six goals in four matches, including his record 15th against Sofia rivals CSKA. During that season, he showed once again his strong leadership, playing even with an injury and protectors on his face because of a broken cheek-bone. He became a Champion of Bulgaria in 2009.

== International career ==
Ivanov represented the Bulgarian national team from 1996 to 2005. He made his international debut on 8 October 1996 in a match against Luxembourg, which Bulgaria won 2–1.

He was included in Bulgaria's squad for the 1998 FIFA World Cup, held in France. However, he did not appear in any of the team's three group-stage matches against Paraguay, Nigeria, and Spain. Bulgaria drew 0–0 with Paraguay, lost 1–0 to Nigeria, and suffered a 6–1 defeat against Spain, resulting in their elimination from the group stage.

Ivanov continued representing Bulgaria until 2005, making his final international appearance on 3 September 2005 in a 2006 FIFA World Cup qualifying match against Sweden. He made a total of 34 appearances and scored four goals for the Bulgarian national team.

== Coaching career ==
=== Executive director ===
Because of injuries, Ivanov did not start the 09/10 season. On 23 July 2009, Ivanov became a manager and head of the sport technical issues in PFC Levski Sofia, but he said that when he is ready he could play again.

=== Head coach ===
After the fourth defeat in eight competitions, Levski Sofia have replaced the manager Ratko Dostanic, with the sports manager.

He took over Levski in the 10th round, but collected only 9 points. After the end of the season, Ivanov finished with the team in third place and achieved qualification for the UEFA Europa League.

On 20 May 2010, Ivanov hired Yasen Petrov as Levski's head coach, ending his coaching career.

He also became caretaker manager of Levski following the resignation of Nikolay Kostov on 26 March 2012.

On 10 October 2012, Ivanov was announced as the new manager of Lokomotiv Plovdiv, replacing Emil Velev. However, he left the team after just one day in charge of the training process. Between December 2012 and the summer of 2014, Ivanov served as manager of Cherno More Varna. After that he returned to Levski Sofia, where he alternated between the positions of head coach and director of football (on occasions also holding them at the same time).

On 21 June 2016, Ivanov returned as manager of Cherno More, replacing Nikola Spasov. On 21 September 2017, he resigned following a streak of poor results.

=== Executive director ===
In August 2019, he became the sports director of Lokomotiv Plovdiv.

=== Bulgaria ===
On 6 June 2022, Ivanov took over as interim manager of Bulgaria after the resignation of Yasen Petrov. In his capacity as a technical director of the Bulgarian Football Union, he played a role in the decision of employing Mladen Krstajić as the next permanent head coach of Bulgaria. In January 2023, Ivanov affirmed that as long as he remains in an official capacity with the Football Union, naturalized players of non-Bulgarian origins will not be selected for the national team. The manner in which his statements were worded attracted some controversy due to being perceived as having racial connotations.

== Career statistics ==
Scores and results list Bulgaria's goal tally first.

#	Date	Venue	Opponent	Score	Result	Competition
1.	15 February 2000	Estadio Playa Ancha, Valparaíso, Chile	Australia	1–1	1–1	Ciudad de Valparaíso Tournament
2.	7 October 2000	Georgi Asparuhov Stadium, Sofia, Bulgaria	Malta	1–0	3–0	2002 World Cup qualifier
3.	7 October 2000	Georgi Asparuhov Stadium, Sofia, Bulgaria	Malta	2–0	3–0	2002 World Cup qualifier
4.	2 June 2001	Windsor Park, Belfast, Northern Ireland	Northern Ireland	1–0	1–0	2002 World Cup qualifier

== Managerial statistics ==
As of 12 June 2022

Team	From	To	Record							
Team	From	To	G	W	D	L	Win %	GF	GA	GD
Levski Sofia	19 October 2009	30 June 2010	27	16	4	7	59.26	46	23	+23
Levski Sofia	1 June 2011	3 November 2011	13	8	0	5	61.54	21	15	+6
Levski Sofia	27 March 2012	7 April 2012	2	0	0	2	0.00	0	2	–2
Cherno More	17 December 2012	19 May 2014	57	20	18	19	35.09	63	52	+11
Levski Sofia	4 August 2014	22 December 2014	19	9	3	7	47.37	33	24	+9
Cherno More	21 June 2016	21 September 2017	49	19	10	20	38.78	57	61	–4
Bulgaria	6 June 2022	12 June 2022	2	0	2	0	0.00	1	1	+0
Total			169	72	37	60	42.60	221	178	+43

== Honours ==
Levski Sofia

- A PFG: 2000, 2001, 2002, 2006, 2007, 2009
- Bulgarian Cup: 1998, 2000, 2002, 2007

Individual

- Bulgarian Footballer of the Year: 2000, 2001
- A PFG top scorer: 2001
