= Todor Barzov =

Bulgarian footballer

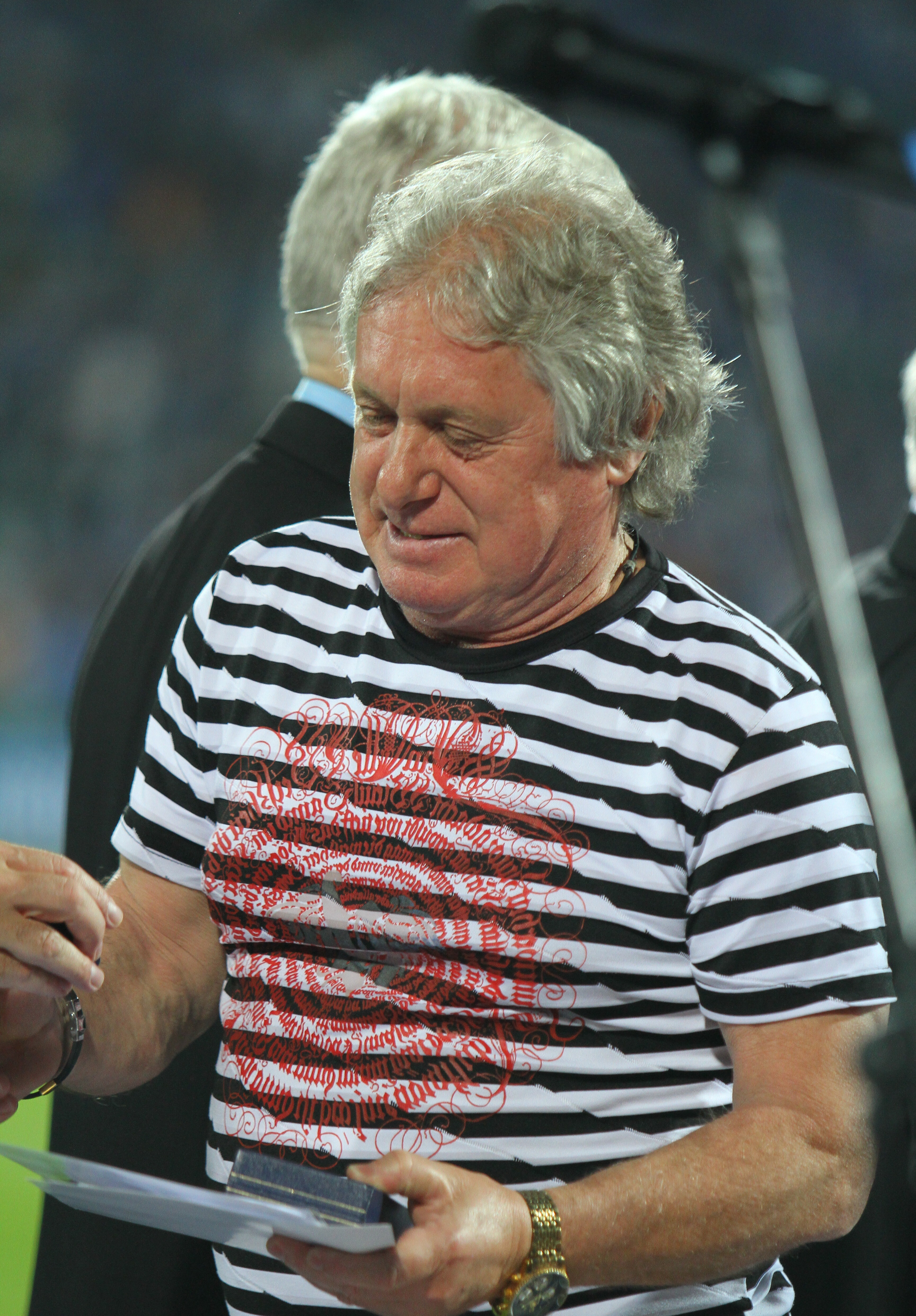

Personal information
- Date of birth: 21 February 1953 (age 73)
- Place of birth: Dolna Mitropoliya, Bulgaria
- Height: 1.68 m (5 ft 6 in)
- Position: Midfielder

Senior career*
Years	Team	Apps	(Gls)
1971–1976	Spartak Pleven	123	(25)
1976–1982	Levski Sofia	148	(21)
1982–1984	Doxa Drama	48	(14)
1984–1986	Panionios	51	(22)
1986–1988	Apollon Limassol	?	(?)
Total		370	(83)

International career
1973–1979	Bulgaria	18	(2)
- * Club domestic league appearances and goals

Todor Barzov (Bulgarian: Тодор Барзов; born 21 February 1953 in Dolna Mitropoliya) is a retired Bulgarian footballer who played as а midfielder.

A skillful free-kick taker, he scored numerous goals from different positions, in a career which spanned almost 18 years.

== Honours ==
Levski Sofia

- Bulgarian champion: 1976–77, 1978–79
- Bulgarian Cup: 1976–77, 1978–79

International

- 1973–76 Balkan Cup winner with Bulgaria
