= Georgi Todorov (football manager) =

Bulgarian footballer and manager

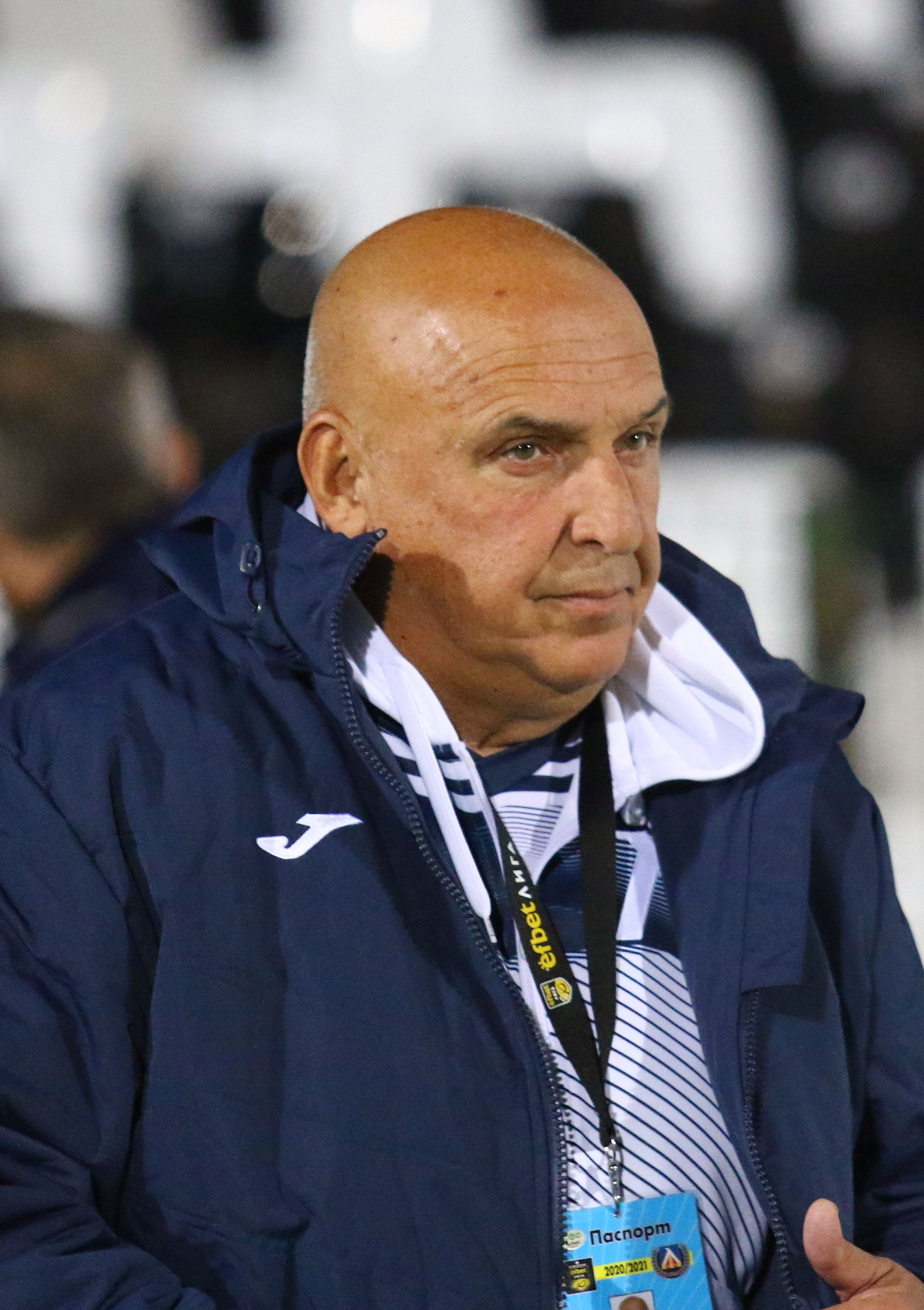

Personal information
- Full name: Georgi Vasilev Todorov
- Date of birth: 13 June 1956 (age 70)
- Place of birth: Sofia, Bulgaria
- Height: 1.85 m (6 ft 1 in)
- Position: Striker

Youth career
- Levski Sofia

Senior career*
Years	Team	Apps	(Gls)
1975–1979	Levski Sofia	33	(11)
1979–1980	Etar	26	(3)
1980–1982	Shumen	79	(59)
1982–1983	Dunav Ruse	–	(–)
1983–1985	Osam Lovech	–	(–)
1987–1989	Shumen	51	(35)
1989–1990	Lokomotiv GO	30	(9)
1990–1992	Shumen	–	(–)

Managerial career
- 1992–1994: Shumen (assistant)
- 1995: Shumen
- 1997–1998: Storgozia Pleven
- 2001: Levski Sofia
- 2003: Levski Sofia
- 2004–2005: Zagorets
- 2006–2007: Chavdar BS
- 2008: Svilengrad
- 2008–2009: Lokomotiv Mezdra
- 2009: Minyor Radnevo
- 2011: Etar 1924
- 2018–2019: Levski Sofia
- 2020: Levski Sofia
- 2020–2021: Levski Sofia (scout)
- * Club domestic league appearances and goals

Georgi Vasilev Todorov (Bulgarian: Георги Василев Тодоров; born 13 June 1956) is a Bulgarian professional football manager.

== Honours ==
Player
Levski Sofia

- Bulgarian A PFG – 1979
- Bulgarian Cup – 1979

Coach
Levski Sofia

- Bulgarian Cup – 2003
