= Tsvetomir Parvanov =

Bulgarian footballer and manager

Personal information
- Date of birth: 11 January 1962 (age 64)
- Place of birth: Gabrovo, Bulgaria
- Position: Defender

Senior career*
Years	Team	Apps	(Gls)
1982–1986	Yantra Gabrovo	102	(8)
1986–1993	Etar	196	(3)
1993–1994	Shumen	?	(?)
1995–1998	Olimpik Teteven		
- * Club domestic league appearances and goals

Tsvetomir Parvanov (Bulgarian: Цветомир Първанов; born 11 January 1962) is a Bulgarian former footballer and manager.

== Career ==
Amassing more than 200 matches in the A PFG, Parvanov represented Yantra Gabrovo, Etar, Shumen, Olympik Teteven and Beroe. With the "violets" from Veliko Tarnovo he became champion of Bulgaria in 1991.
