= Spas Dzhevizov =

Bulgarian footballer

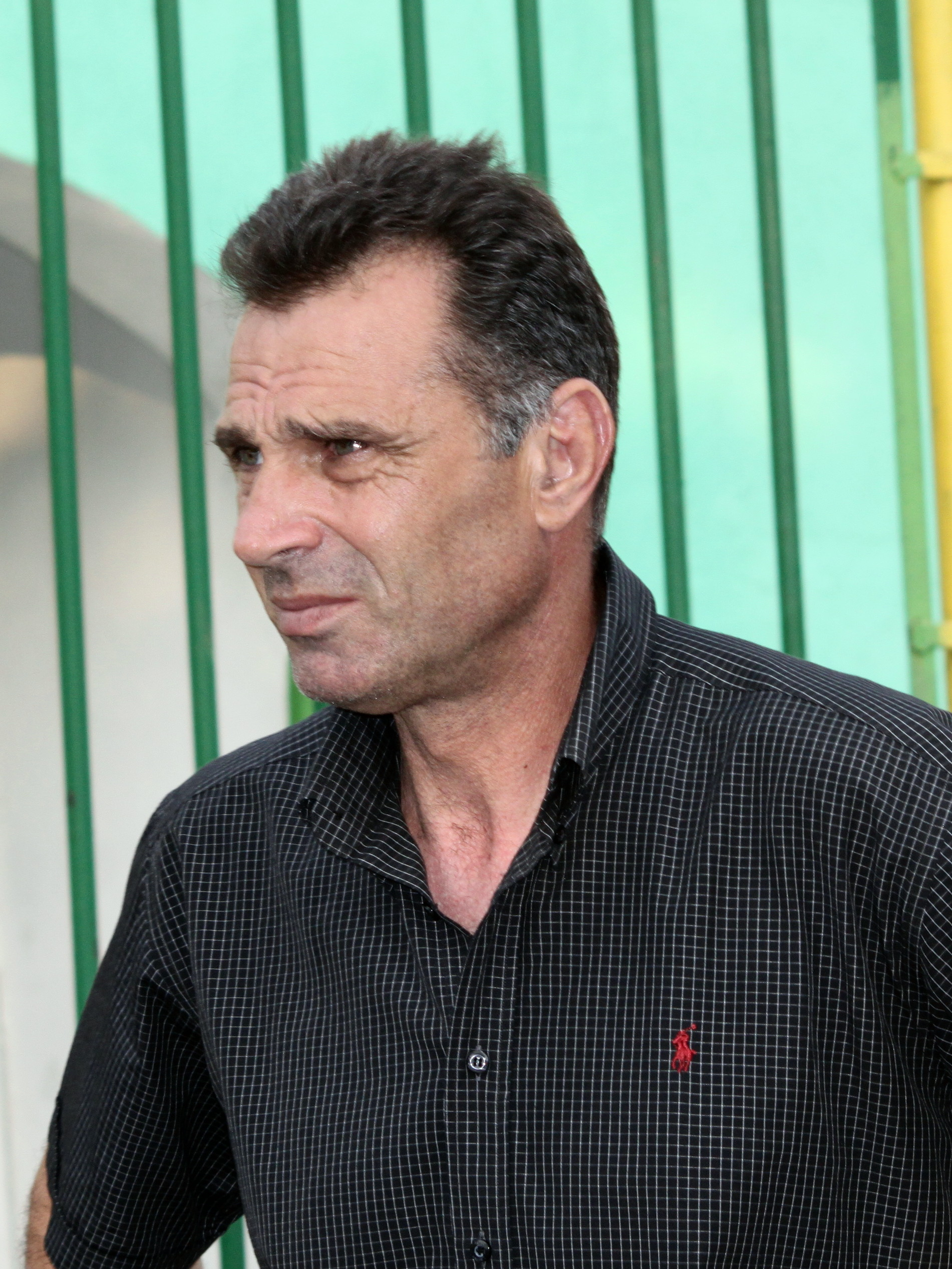

Personal information
- Full name: Spas Andreev Dzhevizov
- Date of birth: 27 September 1955 (age 71)
- Place of birth: Plovdiv, Bulgaria
- Position: Forward

Senior career*
Years	Team	Apps	(Gls)
1974–1976	Trakia Plovdiv	49	(11)
1976–1984	CSKA Sofia	205	(96)
1984–1987	Omonia	129	(82)
1988	Minyor Pernik	–	(7)
1989–1990	EPA Larnaca	–	(–)

International career
1976–1983	Bulgaria	20	(3)

Managerial career
- 1994–1995: CSKA Sofia
- 2000: CSKA Sofia
- 2001: Alki Larnaca
- * Club domestic league appearances and goals

Spas Andreev Dzhevizov (Bulgarian: Спас Джевизов; born 27 September 1955 in Plovdiv) is a former Bulgarian footballer who played as a forward. For the Bulgaria national team he featured in 20 games and scored 3 goals.

Between 1976 and 1984 Dzhevizov played in 205 matches and scored 96 goals for CSKA Sofia. Dzhevizov won the top Bulgarian league, the A PFG, four times (all with CSKA), as well as the Bulgarian Cup, two times (all with CSKA). He led the league in scoring during the 1979–80 season with 23 goals.

Following his playing career, Dzhevizov became a manager of clubs in Bulgaria and Cyprus, including CSKA Sofia and Alki Larnaca.

== Honours ==
- CSKA Sofia
  - A Group: 1980, 1981, 1982, 1983
  - Bulgarian Cup: 1981, 1983
- AC Omonia
  - Cypriot League: 1985, 1987

=== Individual ===
- Bulgarian League Top Scorer: 1980 (with 23 goals)
- Cypriot League Top Scorer: 1987 (with 32 goals)
