= Georgi Antonov =

Bulgarian footballer

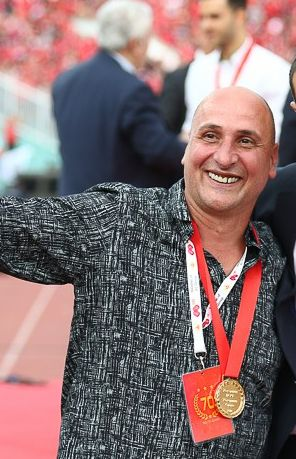

Personal information
- Date of birth: 7 July 1970 (age 56)
- Place of birth: Vratsa, Bulgaria
- Height: 1.74 m (5 ft 9 in)
- Position: Right back

Senior career*
Years	Team	Apps	(Gls)
1988–1994	Botev Vratsa	?	(?)
1994–1995	LEX Lovech	?	(?)
1995–1999	Lokomotiv Sofia	91	(8)
1999–2004	CSKA Sofia	87	(2)

International career
1996–1999	Bulgaria	7	(0)
- * Club domestic league appearances and goals

Georgi Antonov (Bulgarian: Георги Антонов; born 7 July 1970 in Vratsa) is a former Bulgarian footballer who played as a defender.

== Honours ==
=== Club ===
CSKA Sofia

- Bulgarian A Group: 2002–03
