= Ivan Vutsov =

Bulgarian footballer and coach (1939–2019)

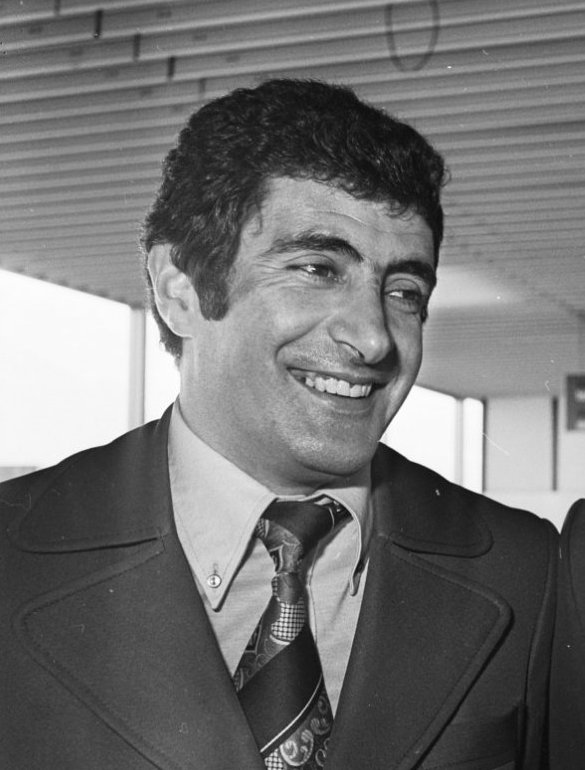
- Vutsov in 1977

Personal information
- Full name: Ivan Kolev Vutsov
- Date of birth: 14 December 1939
- Place of birth: Gabrovo, Bulgaria
- Date of death: 18 January 2019 (aged 79)
- Place of death: Sofia, Bulgaria
- Position: Defender

Senior career*
| Years | Team | Apps | (Gls) |
| 1958–1960 | Botev Plovdiv | 18 | (0) |
| 1960–1969 | Levski Sofia | 214 | (4) |
| 1970–1972 | Akademik Sofia | 70 | (1) |
| Total | | 302 | (5) |

International career
| 1962–1966 | Bulgaria | 24 | (0) |

Managerial career
- 1975–1976: Levski Sofia
- 1977–1980: Levski Sofia
- 1981–1982: Spartak Varna
- 1982–1986: Bulgaria
- 1986–1987: Spartak Pleven
- 1987–1988: Hajduk Split
- 1989–1990: Slavia Sofia
- 1989–1991: Bulgaria
- 1991–1992: Aris
- 1992–1993: Levski Sofia
- 1993–1994: Lokomotiv Plovdiv
- * Club domestic league appearances and goals

Ivan Kolev Vutsov (Bulgarian: Иван Кoлeв Вуцов; 14 December 1939 – 18 January 2019) was a Bulgarian football player and coach. His career included periods playing for and later managing the Bulgaria national team.

He played in three matches at the 1966 FIFA World Cup and for Levski Sofia.

== Playing career ==
Vutsov's professional playing career as a defender spanned nearly 15 years, during which he played for three clubs: Botev Plovdiv, Levski Sofia and Akademik Sofia.

He spent nine seasons with Levski where he won two Bulgarian League titles and one Bulgarian Cup.

Vutsov was capped 24 times for the Bulgaria national football team and appeared in the 1966 FIFA World Cup.

He was also a vice president of the Bulgarian Football Union and manager of the Bulgaria national team, Hajduk Split and PFC Levski Sofia where became famous for overseeing 18 games in the European club competitions during his reign. One of the most prominent players he discovered was Alen Bokšić, when managing Hajduk Split. He also held various administrative positions at the Bulgarian Football Union. His son, Velislav Vutsov, is also a former footballer.

== Achievements ==
As player of Levski

- Bulgarian Champion – 1965, 1968
- Bulgarian Cup – 1967

As player of Bulgaria

- 1966 FIFA World Cup – 15th Place

As coach of Levski

- Bulgarian Champion – 1979
- Bulgarian Cup – 1976, 1979
- UEFA Cup 1/4 Finalist – 1976

As coach of Bulgaria

- 1986 FIFA World Cup – 15th Place
