= Angel Stankov =

Bulgarian footballer

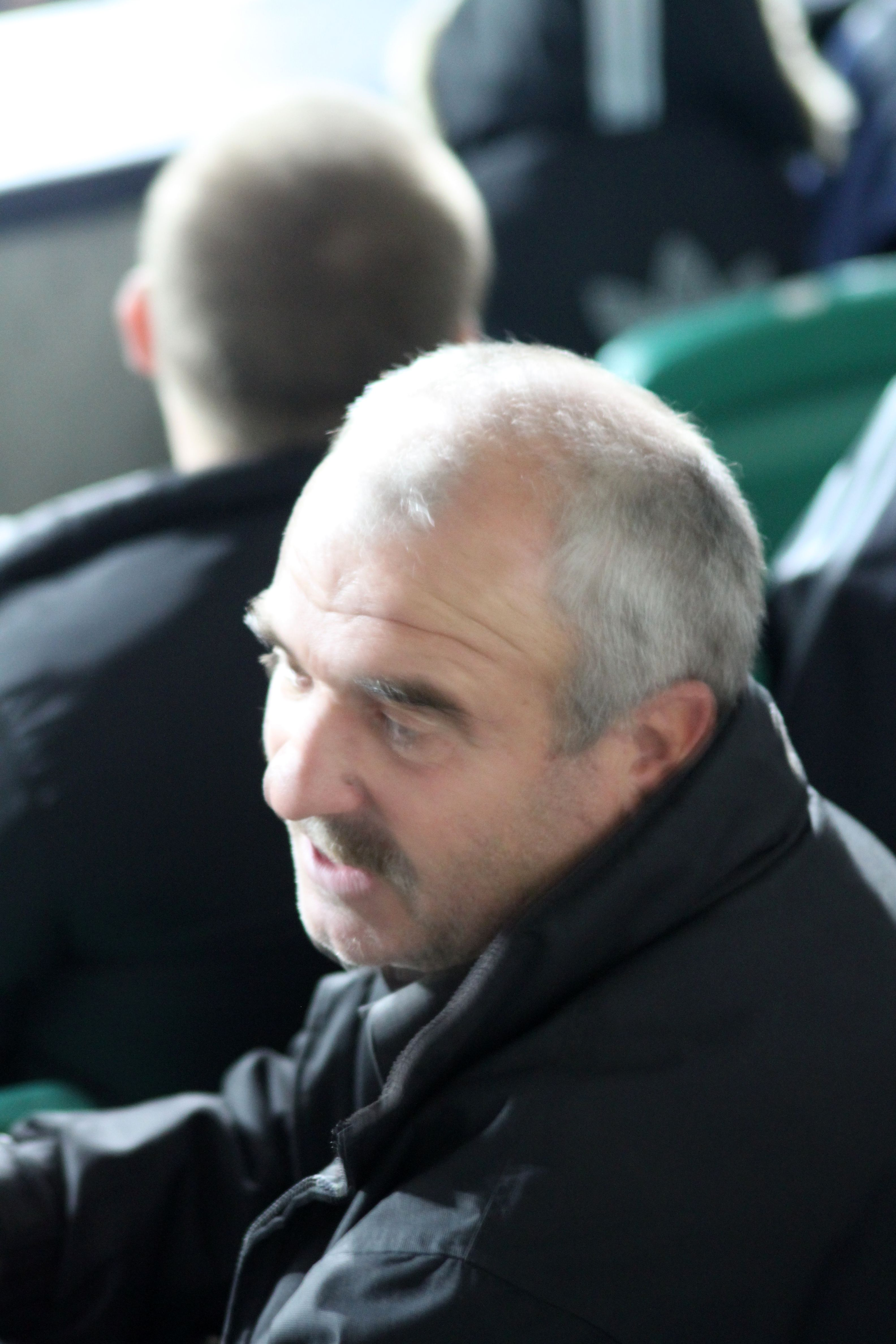

Personal information
- Date of birth: 28 August 1953 (age 73)
- Place of birth: Kladnitsa, Bulgaria
- Position: Midfielder

Senior career*
Years	Team	Apps	(Gls)
–1977	Bdin Vidin		
1977–1981	Levski Sofia		
1981–1982	Akademik Sofia		

International career
1977–1978	Bulgaria	8	(1)

Managerial career
- 1999: Levski Sofia
- 2004–2005: Rodopa Smolyan
- 2013: Akademik Svishtov
- 2014–2015: Rozova Dolina
- * Club domestic league appearances and goals

Angel Stankov (Bulgarian: Ангел Станков, born 28 August 1953) is a Bulgarian football midfielder and later manager.

He mainly played for Levski Sofia, winning the league and cup in 1979.
