= 1974 Bulgarian Cup final =

- Event: 1973–74 Bulgarian Cup
CSKA Sofia	Levski Sofia
2	1
- After extra time
- Date: 10 August 1974
- Venue: Vasil Levski National Stadium, Sofia
- Referee: Tsvetan Stanev (Sofia)
- Attendance: 40,000

The 1974 Bulgarian Cup final was the 34th final of the Bulgarian Cup (in this period the tournament was named Cup of the Soviet Army), and was contested between CSKA Sofia and Levski Sofia on 10 August 1974 at Vasil Levski National Stadium in Sofia. CSKA won the final 2–1 after extra time.

== Match ==
=== Details ===
10 August 1974

CSKA Sofia	2−1 (a.e.t.)	Levski Sofia
Marashliev 9'; Kolev 101'		Tsvetkov 65'

Vasil Levski National Stadium, Sofia
Attendance: 40,000
Referee: Tsvetan Stanev (Sofia)

CSKA	Levski

GK	1	(Bulgaria) Yordan Filipov
DF	2	(Bulgaria) Kiril Lyubomirov
MF	3	(Bulgaria) Kiril Stankov
DF	4	(Bulgaria) Tsonyo Vasilev
DF	5	(Bulgaria) Bozhil Kolev
DF	6	(Bulgaria) Dimitar Penev (c)
FW	7	(Bulgaria) Stefan Mihaylov	(substituted off) 98'
MF	8	(Bulgaria) Asparuh Nikodimov
FW	9	(Bulgaria) Yordan Hristov	(substituted off) 73'
MF	10	(Bulgaria) Kevork Tahmisyan
FW	11	(Bulgaria) Dimitar Marashliev
Substitutes:
MF	--	(Bulgaria) Tsvetan Atanasov	(substituted in) 73'
FW	--	(Bulgaria) Petar Zhekov	(substituted in) 98'
Manager:
(Bulgaria) Nikola Kovachev

GK	1	(Bulgaria) Stefan Staykov
DF	2	(Bulgaria) Milko Gaydarski
DF	3	(Bulgaria) Dobromir Zhechev (c)
DF	4	(Bulgaria) Stefan Aladzhov
DF	5	(Bulgaria) Kiril Ivkov
MF	6	(Bulgaria) Ivan Stoyanov
FW	7	(Bulgaria) Voyn Voynov
MF	8	(Bulgaria) Stefan Pavlov	(substituted off) 114'
FW	9	(Bulgaria) Georgi Tsvetkov
FW	10	(Bulgaria) Pavel Panov
MF	11	(Bulgaria) Emil Spasov	(substituted off) 114'
Substitutes:
MF	--	(Bulgaria) Georgi Dobrev	(substituted in) 114'
MF	--	(Bulgaria) Vasil Mitkov	(substituted in) 114'
Manager:
(Bulgaria) Dimitar Doychinov

== See also ==
- 1973–74 A Group
