= 1977 Bulgarian Cup final =

- Event: 1976–77 Bulgarian Cup
| Levski Sofia | Lokomotiv Sofia |
| 2 | 1 |
- Date: 12 June 1977
- Venue: Vasil Levski National Stadium, Sofia
- Referee: Atanas Mateev (Varna)
- Attendance: 45,000

The 1977 Bulgarian Cup final was the 37th final of the Bulgarian Cup (in this period the tournament was named Cup of the Soviet Army), and was contested between Levski Sofia and Lokomotiv Sofia on 12 June 1977 at Vasil Levski National Stadium in Sofia. Levski won the final 2–1.

== Match ==
=== Details ===
12 June 1977

| Levski Sofia | 2−1 | Lokomotiv Sofia |
|---|---|---|
| Voynov 15'; Yordanov 51' | | Zdravkov 76' |

Vasil Levski National Stadium, Sofia
Attendance: 45,000
Referee: Atanas Mateev (Varna)

| Levski | Lokomotiv |

| GK | 1 | (Bulgaria) Stefan Staykov |
| DF | 2 | (Bulgaria) Nikolay Grancharov |
| DF | 3 | (Bulgaria) Ivan Tishanski |
| DF | 4 | (Bulgaria) Kiril Ivkov (c) |
| MF | 5 | (Bulgaria) Stefan Pavlov |
| MF | 6 | (Bulgaria) Todor Barzov |
| FW | 7 | (Bulgaria) Voyn Voynov |
| FW | 8 | (Bulgaria) Yordan Yordanov |
| FW | 9 | (Bulgaria) Kiril Milanov | (substituted off) 84' |
| FW | 10 | (Bulgaria) Pavel Panov |
| MF | 11 | (Bulgaria) Krasimir Borisov |
Substitutes:
| FW | -- | (Bulgaria) Georgi Tsvetkov | (substituted in) 84' |
Manager:
(Bulgaria) Vasil Spasov

| GK | 1 | (Bulgaria) Rumyancho Goranov |
| DF | 2 | (Bulgaria) Vasko Nedelchev |
| DF | 3 | (Bulgaria) Borislav Dimitrov |
| DF | 4 | (Bulgaria) Georgi Bonev |
| DF | 5 | (Bulgaria) Yordan Stoykov |
| MF | 6 | (Bulgaria) Ventsislav Arsov |
| MF | 7 | (Bulgaria) Radoslav Zdravkov |
| MF | 8 | (Bulgaria) Angel Kolev |
| FW | 9 | (Bulgaria) Boycho Velichkov |
| FW | 10 | (Bulgaria) Atanas Mihaylov (c) |
| FW | 11 | (Bulgaria) Lyuben Traykov |
Substitutes:
Manager:
(Bulgaria) Apostol Chachevski

== See also ==
- 1976–77 A Group
