= Malta national football team results (1957–1979) =

- Win Draw Loss

This is a list of Malta national football team results from 1957 to 1979.

== 1950s ==
=== 1957 ===
24 February International Friendly	Malta	2 – 3	Austria	Gżira, Malta
	Cauchi 86'; Nicholl 89'	Report	Bonnici 16' (o.g.); Wagner 72'; Haummer 78'	Stadium: Empire Stadium; Attendance: 17,421; Referee: Vincenzo Orlandini (Italy)

=== 1958 ===
25 January International Friendly	Malta	3 – 0	Denmark XI	Gżira, Malta
	Demanuele 11', 49'; Schembri 23'	Report		Stadium: Empire Stadium; Attendance: 16,919; Referee: Vincenzo Orlandini (Italy)

15 May International Friendly	Malta	1 – 1	Italy U-23	Gżira, Malta
	Cauchi 47' (pen.)	Report	Gino Bertucco 44'	Stadium: Empire Stadium; Attendance: 12,715; Referee: Alf Bond (England)

=== 1959 ===
8 March International Friendly	Tunisia	0 – 0	Malta	Tunis, Tunisia
		Report		Stadium: Stade Municipal Géo-André; Attendance: 8,000; Referee: Pietro Bonetto (Italy)

== 1960s ==
=== 1960 ===
8 December International Friendly	Malta	1 – 0	Tunisia	Gżira, Malta
	Borg 28'	Report		Stadium: Empire Stadium; Attendance: 7,200; Referee: Giulio Campanati (Italy)

=== 1961 ===
18 June International Friendly	Malta	0 – 3	Italy C	Gżira, Malta
		Report	Torriglia 28', 55', 80'	Stadium: Empire Stadium; Attendance: 4,000; Referee: Maurice Guigue (France)

5 November International Friendly	Malta	1 – 1	Norway	Gżira, Malta
	Demanuele 13'	Report	Kotte 86'	Stadium: Empire Stadium; Attendance: 7,000; Referee: Mustapha Belhouas (Tunisia)

=== 1962 ===
28 June 1964 UEFA ENC; Preliminary Round	Denmark	6 – 1	Malta	Copenhagen, Denmark
19:00 UTC+1	O. Madsen 9', 14', 49'; Clausen 22'; Enoksen 71'; Bertelsen 80'	Report	Theobald 57'	Stadium: Idrætsparken; Attendance: 10,622; Referee: Pieter Roomer (Netherlands)

3 July International Friendly	Norway	5 – 0	Malta	Trondheim, Norway
	Nilsen 28', 81', 85'; Pedersen 58'; John Krogh 80'	Report		Stadium: Lerkendal Stadion; Attendance: 15,075; Referee: Orja Pättiniemi (Finland)

8 December 1964 UEFA ENC; Preliminary Round	Malta	1 – 3	Denmark	Gżira, Malta
14:00 UTC+1	Urpani 39'	Report	Madsen 14'; Christiansen 42'; Bertelsen 47'	Stadium: Empire Stadium; Attendance: 6,987; Referee: Raoul Righi (Italy)

=== 1964 ===
8 March International Friendly	Malta	0 – 2	Italy C	Gżira, Malta
		Report		Stadium: Empire Stadium; Attendance: 4,560; Referee: Karl Keller (Switzerland)

=== 1966 ===
13 February International Friendly	Malta	1 – 0	Libya	Gżira, Malta
	Aquilina 26'	Report		Stadium: Manoel Island Football Ground; Attendance: 4,500; Referee: Arthur Lentini (Malta)

27 March International Friendly	Libya	0 – 1 (Note: The match was abandoned at the 88th minute after the Maltese players protested with the referee following the dismissal of one of their players.)	Malta	Tripoli, Libya
		Report	Cocks 17'	Attendance: 5,000; Referee: Mahjoub Badreddin (Libya)

=== 1969 ===
27 April International Friendly	Malta	1 – 3	Austria	Gżira, Malta
	Cini 46'	Report	Köglberger 21', 62'; Kreuz 27'	Stadium: Empire Stadium; Attendance: 9,449; Referee: Fabio Monti (Italy)

== 1970s ==
=== 1970 ===
4 January International Friendly	Malta	1 – 1	Luxembourg	Gżira, Malta
	Cini 85'	Report	Hoffmann 8'	Stadium: Empire Stadium; Attendance: 7,455; Referee: Alessandro D'Agostini (Italy)

11 October 1972 UEFA EC; Qualifying Group 3	Malta	1 – 1	Greece	Gżira, Malta
	Vassallo 66'	Report	Kritikopoulos 88'	Stadium: Empire Stadium; Attendance: 8,689; Referee: Rosario Lo Bello (Italy)

20 December 1972 UEFA EC; Qualifying Group 3	Malta	1 – 2	Switzerland	Gżira, Malta
	Theobald 57' (pen.)	Report	Quentin 50'; Künzli 59'	Stadium: Empire Stadium; Attendance: 4,739; Referee: Gocho Rusev (Bulgaria)

=== 1971 ===
3 February 1972 UEFA EC; Qualifying Group 3	Malta	0 – 1	England	Gżira, Malta
		Report	Peters 35'	Stadium: Empire Stadium; Attendance: 29,751; Referee: Ferdinand Marschall (Austria)

21 April 1972 UEFA EC; Qualifying Group 3	Switzerland	5 – 0	Malta	Lucerne, Switzerland
	Blättler 14'; Künzli 17'; Quentin 26'; Citherlet 28'; Müller 30'	Report		Stadium: Allmend Stadion; Attendance: 16,470; Referee: Gunnar Michaelsen (Denmark)

12 May 1972 UEFA EC; Qualifying Group 3	England	5 – 0	Malta	London, England
	Chivers 1', 47'; Lee 41'; Clarke 46' (pen.); Lawler 74'	Report		Stadium: Wembley Stadium; Attendance: 41,534; Referee: Einar Røed (Norway)

18 June 1972 UEFA EC; Qualifying Group 3	Greece	2 – 0	Malta	Piraeus, Greece
	Davourlis 60'; Aidiniou 80'	Report		Stadium: Stadio Karaiskaki; Attendance: 9,561; Referee: István Zsolt (Hungary)

14 November 1974 FIFA WC; Qualifying Group 1	Malta	0 – 2	Hungary	Gżira, Malta
		Report	3', 56' Bene	Stadium: Empire Stadium; Attendance: 9,231; Referee: Concetto Lo Bello (Italy)

8 December International Friendly	Malta	1 – 1	Algeria	Gżira, Malta
	Vassallo 30'	Report	Fendi 15'	Stadium: Empire Stadium; Attendance: 2,505; Referee: Fabio Monti (Italy)

=== 1972 ===
15 March International Friendly	Algeria	1 – 0	Malta	Algiers, Algeria
	Boussadia 72'	Report		Stadium: August 20, 1955 Stadium; Attendance: 5,000; Referee: Taouifik Ghayaza (Tunisia)

30 April 1974 FIFA WC; Qualifying Group 1	Austria	4 – 0	Malta	Vienna, Austria
	Hickersberger 29', 34', 36'; Hof 85'	Report		Stadium: Praterstadion; Attendance: 16,081; Referee: Karlo Kruashvili (Soviet Union)

6 May 1974 FIFA WC; Qualifying Group 1	Hungary	3 – 0	Malta	Budapest, Hungary
	Kocsis 35'; Bene 60'; I. Juhász 75'	Report		Stadium: Megyeri úti Stadion; Attendance: 5,646; Referee: Milivoje Gugulović (Yugoslavia)

15 October 1974 FIFA WC; Qualifying Group 1	Sweden	7 – 0	Malta	Gothenburg, Sweden
	Edström 2', 32', 64'; Larsson 18', 35' (pen.); Sandberg 44'; Szepanski 57' (pen.)	Report		Stadium: Ullevi Stadion; Attendance: 24,277; Referee: Martti Hirviniemi (Finland)

25 November 1974 FIFA WC; Qualifying Group 1	Malta	0 – 2	Austria	Gżira, Malta
		Report	Köglberger 48'; Spiteri 77' (o.g.)	Stadium: Empire Stadium; Attendance: 4,373; Referee: Francesco Francescon (Italy)

=== 1973 ===
28 September International Friendly	Malta	2 – 0	Canada	Gżira, Malta
	Arpa 37'; Xuereb 75'	Report		Stadium: Empire Stadium; Attendance: 249; Referee: George Busuttil (Malta)

11 November 1974 FIFA WC; Qualifying Group 1	Malta	1 – 2	Sweden	Gżira, Malta
	Camilleri 20'	Report	Kindvall 21'; Larsson 35' (pen.)	Stadium: Empire Stadium; Attendance: 15,459; Referee: Giorgos Katsoras (Greece)

=== 1974 ===
24 August International Friendly	Malta	0 – 1	Libya	Gżira, Malta
		Report	Sherif 2'	Stadium: Empire Stadium; Attendance: 2,305; Referee: Richard Casha (Malta)

4 September Libyan Revolution 5th Anniversary Tournament	Libya	0 – 0	Malta	Tripoli, Libya
		Report		Stadium: June 11 Stadium; Attendance: 8,000; Referee: Youssef El Ghoul (Libya)

22 December 1976 UEFA EC; Qualifying Group 8	Malta	0 – 1	West Germany	Gżira, Malta
		Report	Cullmann 44'	Stadium: Empire Stadium; Attendance: 12,528; Referee: Gyula Emsberger (Hungary)

=== 1975 ===
23 February 1976 UEFA EC; Qualifying Group 8	Malta	2 – 0	Greece	Gżira, Malta
	Aquilina 33'; Magro 79'	Report		Stadium: Empire Stadium; Attendance: 8,621; Referee: Bob Matthewson (England)

4 June 1976 UEFA EC; Qualifying Group 8	Greece	4 – 0	Malta	Salonika, Greece
	Mavros 32'; Antoniadis 34' (pen.); Iosifidis 47'; Papaioannou 50'	Report		Stadium: Stadio Toumbas; Attendance: 16,545; Referee: Marijan Rauš (Yugoslavia)

11 June 1976 UEFA EC; Qualifying Group 8	Bulgaria	5 – 0	Malta	Sofia, Bulgaria
	Dimitrov 2'; Denev 22'; Panov 25'; Bonev 68' (pen.); Milanov 71'	Report		Stadium: Vasil Levski Stadium; Attendance: 16,545; Referee: Michal Jursa (Czechoslovakia)

21 December 1976 UEFA EC; Qualifying Group 8	Malta	0 – 2	Bulgaria	Gżira, Malta
		Report	Panov 69'; Iordanov 83'	Stadium: Empire Stadium; Attendance: 7,174; Referee: Norbert Rolles (Luxembourg)

=== 1976 ===
28 February 1976 UEFA EC; Qualifying Group 8	West Germany	8 – 0	Malta	Dortmund, Germany
	Worm 5', 27'; Heynckes 34', 58'; Beer 41' (pen.), 77'; Vogts 82'; Hölzenbein 87'	Report		Stadium: Westfalenstadion; Attendance: 52,248; Referee: Marian Kustoń (Poland)

10 March International Friendly	Malta	2 – 2	Libya	Gżira, Malta
	Losco 65', 89'	Report	Rayyani 26'; Ferzani 51'	Stadium: Empire Stadium; Attendance: 1,207; Referee: Tonio Briguglio (Malta)

31 October 1978 FIFA WC; Qualifying Group 3	Turkey	4 – 0	Malta	İzmir, Turkey
	Mehmet 22'; Cemil 54', 57', 75'	Report		Stadium: İzmir Atatürk Stadium; Attendance: 68,034; Referee: Michal Jursa (Czechoslovakia)

24 November International Friendly	Malta	1 – 1	Tunisia	Gżira, Malta
	Magro 21'	Report	Kamel 89'	Stadium: Empire Stadium; Attendance: 1,500; Referee: Tonio Briguglio (Malta)

5 December 1978 FIFA WC; Qualifying Group 3	Malta	0 – 1	Austria	Gżira, Malta
		Report	Krankl 57'	Stadium: Empire Stadium; Attendance: 7,368; Referee: Hédi Saoudi (Tunisia)

=== 1977 ===
5 March International Friendly	Tunisia	0 – 1	Malta	Tunis, Tunisia
		Report	Xuereb 10'	Stadium: Stade Olympique El Menzah; Attendance: 17,250; Referee: Ali Ben Naceur (Malta)

2 April 1978 FIFA WC; Qualifying Group 3	Malta	0 – 1	East Germany	Gżira, Malta
		Report	Streich 55'	Stadium: Empire Stadium; Attendance: 6,279; Referee: Bruno Della Bruna (Switzerland)

30 April 1978 FIFA WC; Qualifying Group 3	Austria	9 – 0	Malta	Salzburg, Austria
	Krankl 9', 12', 18', 20', 53', 66'; Stering 30', 69'; Pirkner 65'	Report		Stadium: Stadion Lehen; Attendance: 17,000; Referee: Alojzy Jarguz (Poland)

6 September International Friendly	Tunisia	2 – 1	Malta	Tunis, Tunisia
	Agrebi 27'; Tarak 57'	Report	Xuereb 64'	Stadium: Stade Chedly Zouiten; Attendance: 5,000; Referee: Ali Ben Naceur (Tunisia)

29 October 1978 FIFA WC; Qualifying Group 3	East Germany	9 – 0	Malta	Babelsberg, East Germany
	Hoffman 2', 44', 84'; Schade 38'; Sparwasser 52'; Weber 56'; Streich 63' (pen.), 79', 82'	Report		Stadium: Karl-Liebknecht-Stadion; Attendance: 17,000; Referee: Jafar Namdar (Iran)

27 November 1978 FIFA WC; Qualifying Group 3	Malta	0 – 3	Turkey	Gżira, Malta
		Report	Sedat 21', 48'; Cemil 36'	Stadium: Empire Stadium; Attendance: 2,246; Referee: Mohamed Larache (Morocco)

=== 1978 ===
4 March International Friendly	Malta	1 – 0	Tunisia	Gżira, Malta
	Losco 7'	Report		Stadium: Empire Stadium; Referee: Richard Stagno-Navarra (Malta)

14 May International Friendly	Libya	1 – 0	Malta	Tripoli, Libya
	Azabi 10'	Report		Referee: Tahir Hasan Zaglud (Libya)

25 October 1980 UEFA EC; Qualifying Group 7	Wales	7 – 0	Malta	Wrexham, Wales
	O'Sullivan 18'; Edwards 20', 45', 48', 51'; Thomas 71'; Flynn 82'	Report		Stadium: Racecourse Ground; Attendance: 11,475; Referee: Magnus C. Pétursson (Iceland)

=== 1979 ===
25 February 1980 UEFA EC; Qualifying Group 7	Malta	0 – 0	West Germany	Gżira, Malta
		Report		Stadium: Empire Stadium; Attendance: 8,450; Referee: Vojtech Christov (Slovakia)

18 March 1980 UEFA EC; Qualifying Group 7	Turkey	2 – 1	Malta	İzmir, Turkey
	Özden 34'; Terim 54'	Report	Spiteri-Gonzi 52'	Stadium: Alsancak Stadium; Attendance: 34,154; Referee: Tome Manojlovski (Yugoslavia)

2 June 1980 UEFA EC; Qualifying Group 7	Malta	0 – 2	Wales	Gżira, Malta
		Report	Nicholas 15'; Flynn 51'	Stadium: Empire Stadium; Attendance: 8,358; Referee: Nikolaos Lagoyannis (Greece)

28 August International Friendly	Tunisia	4 – 0	Malta	Tunis, Tunisia
	Tounsi 44'; Bayari 58'; Ben Brahim 85'; Hergal 87'	Report		Stadium: Stade Chedly Zouiten; Attendance: 8,000; Referee: Larbi Oueslati (Tunisia)

28 October 1980 UEFA EC; Qualifying Group 7	Malta	1 – 2	Turkey	Gżira, Malta
	Farrugia 62'	Report	Özden 20'; Denizli 25'	Stadium: Empire Stadium; Attendance: 1,976; Referee: Gianfranco Menegali (Italy)
