= 1976 Bulgarian Cup final =

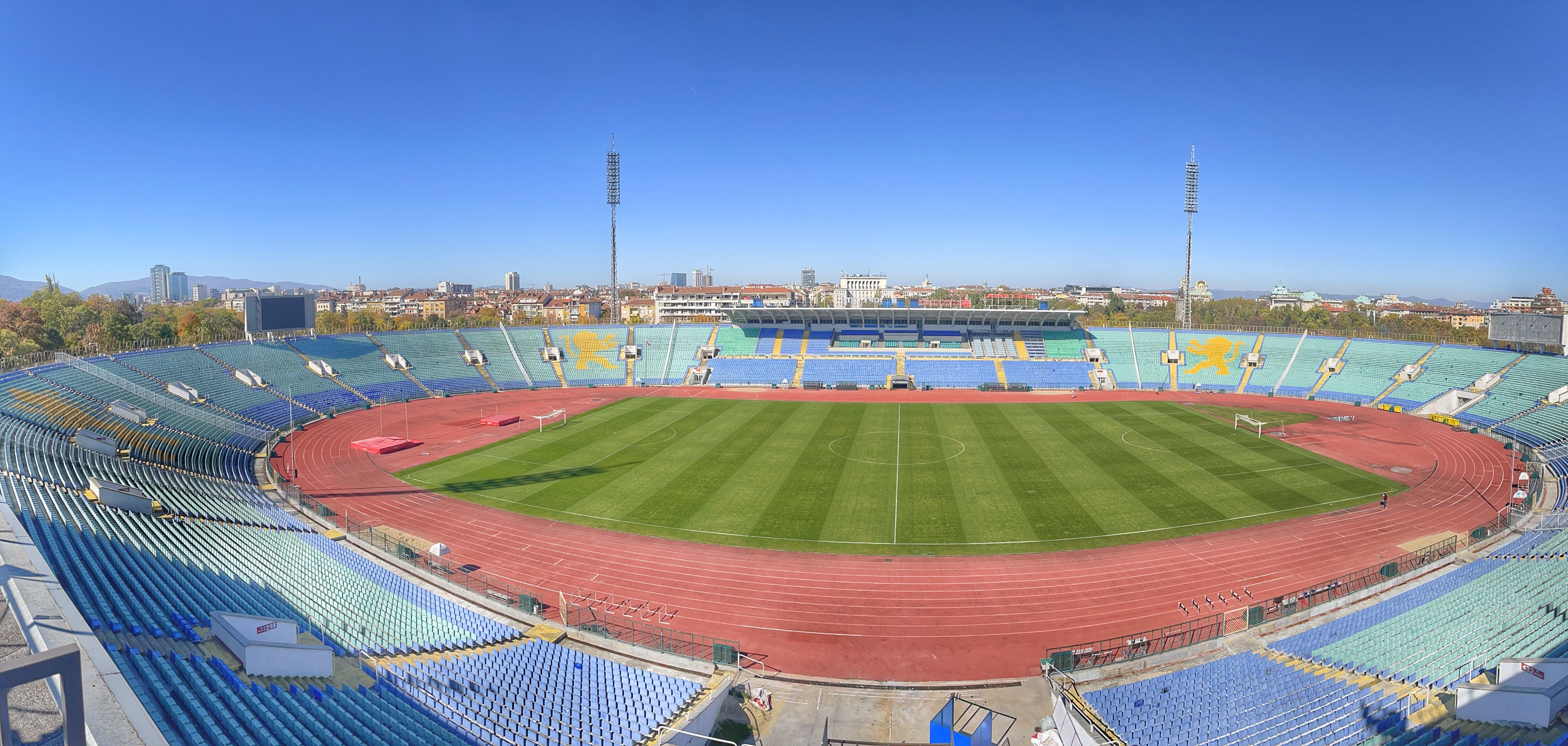
- Event: 1975–76 Bulgarian Cup
Levski Sofia	CSKA Sofia
A Group	A Group
4	3
- After extra time
- Date: 2 June 1976
- Venue: Vasil Levski National Stadium, Sofia
- Referee: Petar Nikolov (Sofia)
- Attendance: 65,000

The 1976 Bulgarian Cup final was the 36th final of the Bulgarian Cup (in this period the tournament was named Cup of the Soviet Army), and was contested between Levski Sofia and CSKA Sofia on 2 June 1976 at Vasil Levski National Stadium in Sofia. Levski won the final 4–3 after extra time.

== Match ==
=== Details ===
2 June 1976

Levski Sofia	4−3 (a.e.t.)	CSKA Sofia
Yordanov 18'; Panov 21'; Tsvetkov 93', 100'		Kolev 36'; Denev 40'; Goranov 94'

Vasil Levski National Stadium, Sofia
Attendance: 65,000
Referee: Petar Nikolov (Sofia)

Levski	CSKA

GK	1	(Bulgaria) Nikolay Iliev
DF	2	(Bulgaria) Nikolay Grancharov
DF	3	(Bulgaria) Ivan Tishanski
DF	4	(Bulgaria) Stefan Aladzhov
DF	5	(Bulgaria) Kiril Ivkov (c)
MF	6	(Bulgaria) Ivan Stoyanov
FW	7	(Bulgaria) Yordan Yordanov
MF	8	(Bulgaria) Stefan Pavlov	(substituted off) 96'
FW	9	(Bulgaria) Georgi Tsvetkov
FW	10	(Bulgaria) Pavel Panov
MF	11	(Bulgaria) Emil Spasov	(substituted off) 71'
Substitutes:
FW	--	(Bulgaria) Voyn Voynov	(substituted in) 71'
DF	--	(Bulgaria) Milko Gaydarski	(substituted in) 96'
Manager:
(Bulgaria) Ivan Vutsov

GK	1	(Bulgaria) Stoyan Yordanov
DF	2	(Bulgaria) Borislav Sredkov
DF	3	(Bulgaria) Angel Rangelov
DF	4	(Bulgaria) Tsonyo Vasilev
DF	5	(Bulgaria) Bozhil Kolev (c)
MF	6	(Bulgaria) Kiril Stankov
FW	7	(Bulgaria) Ivan Pritargov	(substituted off) 99'
MF	8	(Bulgaria) Milen Goranov
FW	9	(Bulgaria) Dimitar Dimitrov
MF	10	(Bulgaria) Georgi Denev
FW	11	(Bulgaria) Tsvetan Yonchev	(substituted off) 53'
Substitutes:
FW	--	(Bulgaria) Dimitar Marashliev	(substituted in) 53'
MF	--	(Bulgaria) Plamen Markov	(substituted in) 99'
Manager:
(Bulgaria) Sergi Yotsov

== See also ==
- 1975–76 A Group
