= 1971 Bulgarian Cup final =

- Event: 1970–71 Bulgarian Cup
Levski Sofia	Lokomotiv Plovdiv
3	0
- Date: 25 August 1971
- Venue: Bulgarian Army Stadium, Sofia
- Referee: Atanas Mateev (Varna)
- Attendance: 30,000

The 1971 Bulgarian Cup final was the 31st final of the Bulgarian Cup (in this period the tournament was named Cup of the Soviet Army), and was contested between Levski Sofia and Lokomotiv Plovdiv on 25 August 1971 at Bulgarian Army Stadium in Sofia. Levski won the final 3–0.

== Match ==
=== Details ===
25 August 1971

Levski Sofia	3−0	Lokomotiv Plovdiv
Tsvetkov 8'; Y. Kirilov 36'; P. Kirilov 38'

Bulgarian Army Stadium, Sofia
Attendance: 30,000
Referee: Atanas Mateev (Varna)

Levski	Lokomotiv

GK	1	(Bulgaria) Biser Mihaylov
DF	2	(Bulgaria) Milko Gaydarski
DF	3	(Bulgaria) Dobromir Zhechev (c)
DF	4	(Bulgaria) Stefan Aladzhov
DF	5	(Bulgaria) Kiril Ivkov
MF	6	(Bulgaria) Ivan Stoyanov
FW	7	(Bulgaria) Tsvetan Veselinov
MF	8	(Bulgaria) Yanko Kirilov
FW	9	(Bulgaria) Georgi Tsvetkov	(substituted off) 46'
FW	10	(Bulgaria) Pavel Panov
MF	11	(Bulgaria) Petar Kirilov
Substitutes:
MF	--	(Bulgaria) Yosif Haralampiev	(substituted in) 46'
Manager:
(Bulgaria) Yoncho Arsov

GK	1	(Bulgaria) Stancho Bonchev
DF	2	(Bulgaria) Iliya Bekyarov
DF	3	(Bulgaria) Nedyalko Stamboliev
DF	4	(Bulgaria) Gancho Peev
DF	5	(Bulgaria) Kostas Panayotis
MF	6	(Bulgaria) Vasil Ankov
FW	7	(Bulgaria) Georgi Vasilev
MF	8	(Bulgaria) Hristo Bonev (c)
FW	9	(Bulgaria) Dimitar Genov	(substituted in) 46'
MF	10	(Bulgaria) Todor Paunov
FW	11	(Bulgaria) Todor Ivanov
Substitutes:
FW	--	(Bulgaria) Georgi Valkov	(substituted in) 46'
Manager:
(Bulgaria) Ivan Manolov

== See also ==
- 1970–71 A Group
