= 1976–77 A Group =

33rd season of top-tier football league in Bulgaria

A Group
- Season: 1976–77
- Champions: Levski Sofia (13th title)
- Relegated: Minyor; Dunav
- European Cup: Levski
- UEFA Cup: CSKA; Marek
- Matches played: 240
- Goals scored: 609 (2.54 per match)
- Top goalscorer: Pavel Panov (20 goals)

The 1976–77 A Group was the 29th season of the A Football Group, the top Bulgarian professional league for association football clubs, since its establishment in 1948.

== Overview ==
It was contested by 16 teams, and Levski Sofia won the championship.

== League standings ==
Pos	Team	Pld	W	D	L	GF	GA	GD	Pts	Qualification or relegation
1	Levski Sofia (C)	30	17	9	4	73	34	+39	43	Qualification for European Cup first round
2	CSKA Sofia	30	14	11	5	45	27	+18	39	Qualification for UEFA Cup first round
3	Marek Dupnitsa	30	15	8	7	43	28	+15	38	Qualification for UEFA Cup first round
4	Slavia Sofia	30	14	9	7	52	36	+16	37	
5	Botev Vratsa	30	12	7	11	31	35	−4	31	
6	Pirin Blagoevgrad	30	11	9	10	26	30	−4	31	
7	Lokomotiv Sofia	30	9	12	9	42	40	+2	30	Qualification for Cup Winners' Cup first round
8	Lokomotiv Plovdiv	30	10	10	10	32	31	+1	30	
9	Beroe Stara Zagora	30	10	9	11	38	51	−13	29	
10	Sliven	30	10	8	12	41	46	−5	28	
11	Botev Plovdiv	30	7	13	10	36	40	−4	27	
12	Akademik Sofia	30	7	12	11	25	30	−5	26	
13	Akademik Svishtov	30	9	8	13	32	45	−13	26	
14	Spartak Varna	30	7	10	13	37	42	−5	24	
15	Minyor Pernik (R)	30	7	9	14	34	43	−9	23	Relegation to 1977–78 B Group
16	Dunav Ruse (R)	30	5	8	17	22	51	−29	18	Relegation to 1977–78 B Group

Source: rsssf.com
(C) Champions; (R) Relegated

== Results ==
Home \ Away	ASF	ASV	BSZ	BPD	BVR	CSK	DUN	LEV	LPL	LSO	MAR	MIN	PIR	SLA	SLI	SPV
Akademik Sofia		2–0	4–1	1–1	1–1	1–1	0–0	0–0	1–0	1–2	0–1	1–1	2–1	0–1	5–0	1–0
Akademik Svishtov	0–0		3–1	1–1	1–0	1–1	4–0	0–0	1–1	2–0	2–1	2–1	2–1	1–1	1–0	1–0
Beroe Stara Zagora	1–0	1–0		0–0	1–0	0–0	2–0	2–2	2–2	4–2	1–0	5–1	0–0	2–1	0–3	2–1
Botev Plovdiv	1–1	2–1	3–3		1–1	0–1	3–1	3–0	0–2	0–0	1–1	2–1	1–2	2–2	2–2	0–0
Botev Vratsa	0–0	2–0	1–1	3–2		1–1	2–2	0–2	1–0	2–1	1–0	1–0	2–0	2–1	1–0	3–1
CSKA Sofia	1–0	2–0	1–0	1–1	2–0		3–0	1–3	5–1	2–2	1–3	3–0	2–0	0–1	3–2	2–1
Dunav Ruse	1–1	1–1	1–2	0–0	1–2	0–1		0–3	2–0	3–1	1–1	1–0	2–0	1–1	2–0	0–1
Levski Sofia	5–1	5–2	0–0	4–2	4–0	3–2	7–0		2–0	2–1	3–0	3–2	2–0	3–3	5–1	4–2
Lokomotiv Plovdiv	3–0	2–1	3–1	1–2	1–0	0–0	1–0	1–1		2–2	1–0	1–0	2–0	1–1	3–0	1–1
Lokomotiv Sofia	2–0	2–2	3–1	1–0	0–1	1–2	4–1	1–1	1–1		0–0	2–2	3–1	2–0	3–2	1–1
Marek Dupnitsa	0–0	3–0	4–2	1–0	3–0	2–1	1–0	1–1	2–1	1–0		3–0	2–2	1–0	3–2	5–1
Minyor Pernik	0–1	4–0	2–2	2–0	2–1	0–0	3–0	3–3	0–0	1–1	0–3		2–0	2–1	1–1	1–0
Pirin Blagoevgrad	1–0	2–0	2–1	1–3	2–0	0–0	1–0	1–0	2–0	0–0	1–1	1–0		2–2	1–0	1–0
Slavia Sofia	2–1	3–2	4–0	3–1	3–2	1–1	3–1	2–1	1–0	1–2	3–0	1–0	1–1		3–0	4–2
Sliven	3–0	4–1	2–0	3–1	2–1	1–1	0–0	2–0	0–0	1–1	3–0	3–2	0–0	2–1		1–1
Spartak Varna	0–0	2–0	6–0	0–1	0–0	2–4	3–1	1–4	2–1	3–1	0–0	1–1	0–0	1–1	4–1	

Source: A PFG (in Bulgarian)
Legend: Blue = home team win; Yellow = draw; Red = away team win.

== Champions ==
Levski Sofia

Goalkeepers
(Bulgaria) Stefan Staykov	24	(0)
(Bulgaria) Nikolay Iliev	6	(0)

Defenders
(Bulgaria) Nikolay Grancharov	20	(0)
(Bulgaria) Kiril Ivkov	29	(2)
(Bulgaria) Vladimir Nikolchev	3	(0)
(Bulgaria) Valentin Chaushev	3	(0)
(Bulgaria) Stefan Aladzhov	25	(0)
(Bulgaria) Ivan Tishanski	24	(1)
(Bulgaria) Milko Gaydarski	3	(0)

Midfielders
(Bulgaria) Stefan Pavlov	25	(1)
(Bulgaria) Todor Barzov	29	(3)
(Bulgaria) Voyn Voynov	30	(7)
(Bulgaria) Blagoy Krastanov	19	(3)
(Bulgaria) Ivan Stoyanov	1	(0)
(Bulgaria) Krasimir Borisov	25	(7)
(Bulgaria) Emil Spasov	22	(4)

Forwards
(Bulgaria) Pavel Panov	25	(20)
(Bulgaria) Georgi Tsvetkov	18	(2)
(Bulgaria) Kiril Milanov	22	(8)
(Bulgaria) Yordan Yordanov	26	(12)

Manager
(Bulgaria) Vasil Spasov

== Top scorers ==
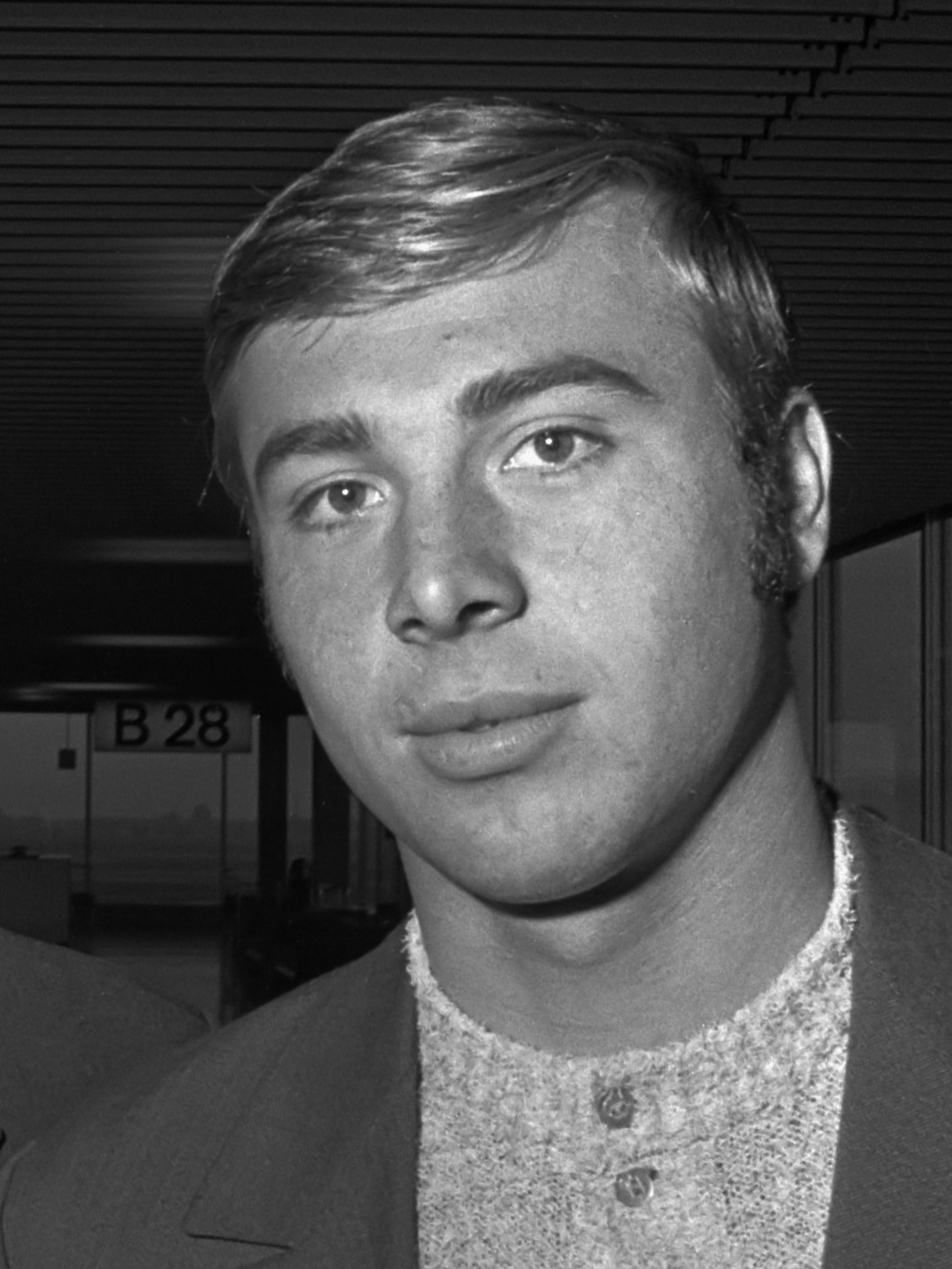
Pavel Panov – top scorer of the season

Rank	Scorer	Club	Goals
1	(Bulgaria) Pavel Panov	Levski Sofia	20
2	(Bulgaria) Yordan Hristov	Sliven	17
3	(Bulgaria) Ivan Petrov	Marek Dupnitsa	16
4	(Bulgaria) Bozhidar Grigorov	Slavia Sofia	15
4	(Bulgaria) Chavdar Tsvetkov	Slavia Sofia	15
6	(Bulgaria) Radoslav Zdravkov	Lokomotiv Sofia	13
7	(Bulgaria) Yordan Yordanov	Levski Sofia	12
7	(Bulgaria) Dimitar Tsekov	Botev Vratsa	12
9	(Bulgaria) Petko Petkov	Beroe Stara Zagora	11
10	(Bulgaria) Stoycho Mladenov	Beroe Stara Zagora	10
