= 1973–74 A Group =

30th season of top-tier football league in Bulgaria

A Group
- Season: 1973–74
- Champions: Levski Sofia (12th title)
- Relegated: Beroe; Spartak Varna
- European Cup: Levski
- UEFA Cup: Lokomotiv Plovdiv; Etar
- Matches played: 240
- Goals scored: 632 (2.63 per match)
- Top goalscorer: Petko Petkov (20 goals)

The 1973–74 A Group was the 26th season of the A Football Group, the top Bulgarian professional league for association football clubs, since its establishment in 1948.

== Overview ==
It was contested by 16 teams, and Levski Sofia won the championship.

== League standings ==
Pos	Team	Pld	W	D	L	GF	GA	GD	Pts	Qualification or relegation
1	Levski Sofia (C)	30	21	5	4	58	30	+28	47	Qualification for European Cup first round
2	CSKA Sofia	30	19	8	3	54	27	+27	46	Qualification for Cup Winners' Cup first round
3	Lokomotiv Plovdiv	30	13	8	9	49	36	+13	34	Qualification for UEFA Cup first round
4	Etar Veliko Tarnovo	30	13	7	10	38	30	+8	33	Qualification for UEFA Cup first round
5	Lokomotiv Sofia	30	12	9	9	35	32	+3	33	
6	Akademik Sofia	30	11	10	9	37	38	−1	32	
7	Botev Vratsa	30	12	6	12	42	48	−6	30	
8	Slavia Sofia	30	10	8	12	36	33	+3	28	
9	Cherno More Varna	30	11	6	13	42	42	0	28	
10	Botev Plovdiv	30	7	13	10	36	42	−6	27	
11	Pirin Blagoevgrad	30	11	5	14	29	43	−14	27	
12	Yantra Gabrovo	30	10	5	15	40	49	−9	25	
13	Minyor Pernik	30	7	11	12	28	45	−17	25	
14	Spartak Pleven	30	7	10	13	32	43	−11	24	
15	Beroe Stara Zagora (R)	30	7	7	16	50	46	+4	21	Relegation to 1974–75 B Group
16	Spartak Varna (R)	30	7	6	17	26	48	−22	20	Relegation to 1974–75 B Group

Source: rsssf.com
(C) Champions; (R) Relegated

== Results ==
Home \ Away	AKD	BSZ	BPD	BVR	CHM	CSK	ETA	LEV	LPL	LSO	MIN	PIR	SLA	SPL	SPV	YAN
Akademik Sofia		0–2	4–2	2–1	3–1	1–2	0–0	0–2	2–2	1–0	3–2	0–1	1–0	1–1	3–1	2–1
Beroe Stara Zagora	2–2		1–1	8–1	3–1	3–3	1–2	1–0	0–2	1–2	8–0	1–2	0–0	6–2	4–0	1–2
Botev Plovdiv	1–1	2–0		3–1	1–1	1–2	0–0	3–2	0–1	0–0	1–1	2–2	2–2	2–1	3–0	2–2
Botev Vratsa	2–0	2–0	2–1		2–1	1–4	1–0	1–3	1–1	3–1	1–1	5–1	3–1	0–0	5–0	2–1
Cherno More	2–2	2–1	1–1	3–0		0–1	1–0	2–3	2–4	3–0	2–0	2–0	2–1	2–2	2–0	3–1
CSKA Sofia	0–0	1–0	4–2	1–0	4–3		2–0	0–1	3–2	0–1	5–1	4–0	2–1	2–2	4–3	2–0
Etar Veliko Tarnovo	3–2	2–1	0–0	3–0	2–0	1–1		1–2	1–1	1–0	2–0	1–1	1–0	1–0	1–0	3–1
Levski Sofia	1–2	3–2	2–0	1–0	1–0	1–1	2–0		2–1	1–0	1–0	4–0	1–0	1–0	3–2	6–1
Lokomotiv Plovdiv	4–0	2–1	2–1	1–1	0–0	0–1	5–1	1–3		1–0	3–1	2–0	1–0	2–1	0–0	7–5
Lokomotiv Sofia	1–1	6–1	4–0	2–0	1–2	0–0	0–6	4–2	1–0		0–0	2–1	1–1	2–1	2–2	1–0
Minyor Pernik	2–1	1–1	1–1	3–1	1–2	1–1	1–0	2–2	1–0	0–1		3–0	0–1	1–0	0–0	1–1
Pirin Blagoevgrad	0–0	1–0	0–1	0–0	2–0	0–1	2–1	2–3	2–1	1–2	1–1		2–1	2–0	1–0	3–1
Slavia Sofia	2–1	1–1	0–0	4–1	2–0	0–0	1–0	2–2	2–2	3–1	1–2	0–1		3–0	2–1	0–1
Spartak Pleven	0–0	0–0	2–0	0–1	2–1	2–1	0–2	1–1	0–0	0–0	1–1	2–1	2–3		3–1	4–1
Spartak Varna	0–1	1–0	0–1	1–3	1–1	0–1	3–1	1–1	2–0	0–0	1–0	1–0	2–0	2–3		1–0
Yantra Gabrovo	0–1	2–0	3–2	1–1	1–0	0–1	2–2	0–1	2–1	0–0	3–0	2–0	0–2	3–0	3–0	

Source: A PFG (in Bulgarian)
Legend: Blue = home team win; Yellow = draw; Red = away team win.

== Champions ==
Levski Sofia

Goalkeepers
(Bulgaria) Stefan Staykov	27	(0)
(Bulgaria) Biser Mihaylov	4	(0)

Defenders
(Bulgaria) Georgi Ganev	2	(0)
(Bulgaria) Kiril Ivkov	28	(2)
(Bulgaria) Georgi Todorov	19	(0)
(Bulgaria) Dobromir Zhechev	27	(1)
(Bulgaria) Stefan Aladzhov	27	(0)
(Bulgaria) Toni Dzheferski	4	(0)
(Bulgaria) Milko Gaydarski	23	(0)

Midfielders
(Bulgaria) Stefan Pavlov	30	(3)
(Bulgaria) Georgi Dobrev	15	(0)
(Bulgaria) Voyn Voynov	29	(8)
(Bulgaria) Tsvetan Veselinov	19	(6)
(Bulgaria) Ivan Stoyanov	26	(1)
(Bulgaria) Vasil Mitkov	21	(5)

Forwards
(Bulgaria) Emil Spasov	1	(0)
(Bulgaria) Pavel Panov	28	(11)
(Bulgaria) Georgi Tsvetkov	17	(7)
(Bulgaria) Kiril Milanov	29	(12)
(Bulgaria) Chavdar Trifonov	10	(1)

Manager
(Bulgaria) Dimitar Doychinov

== Top scorers ==
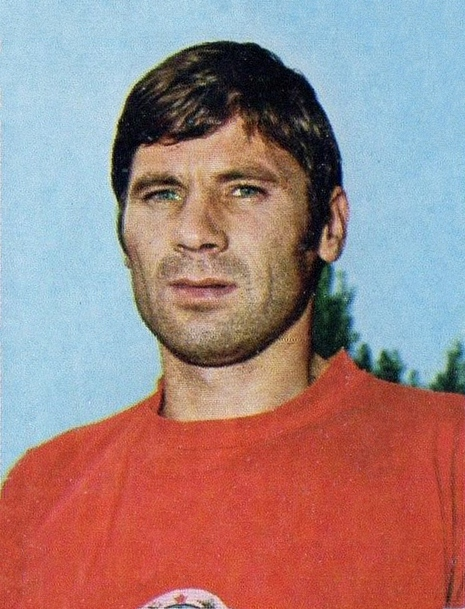
Petko Petkov - top scorer of the season

Rank	Scorer	Club	Goals
1	(Bulgaria) Petko Petkov	Beroe Stara Zagora	20
2	(Bulgaria) Stefan Bogomilov	Cherno More Varna	19
3	(Bulgaria) Dimitar Tsekov	Etar Veliko Tarnovo	17
4	(Bulgaria) Georgi Vasilev	Lokomotiv Plovdiv	15
4	(Bulgaria) Krasen Marinov	Yantra Gabrovo	15
6	(Bulgaria) Hristo Bonev	Lokomotiv Plovdiv	14
7	(Bulgaria) Georgi Kamenov	Botev Vratsa	13
7	(Bulgaria) Dinko Dermendzhiev	Botev Plovdiv	13
9	(Bulgaria) Kiril Milanov	Levski Sofia	12
9	(Bulgaria) Atanas Mihaylov	Lokomotiv Sofia	12
9	(Bulgaria) Georgi Minchev	Spartak Varna	12
