= 1979 Bulgarian Cup final =

- Event: 1978–79 Bulgarian Cup
Levski Sofia	Beroe Stara Zagora
4	1
- Date: 23 May 1979
- Venue: Vasil Levski National Stadium, Sofia
- Referee: Anatoli Kadetov (Soviet Union)
- Attendance: 40,000

The 1979 Bulgarian Cup final was the 39th final of the Bulgarian Cup (in this period the tournament was named Cup of the Soviet Army), and was contested between Levski Sofia and Beroe Stara Zagora on 23 May 1979 at Vasil Levski National Stadium in Sofia. Levski won the final 4–1.

== Match ==
=== Details ===
23 May 1979

Levski Sofia	4−1	Beroe Stara Zagora
Panov 30', 60', 68'; Gochev 47'		Stoyanov 29'

Vasil Levski National Stadium, Sofia
Attendance: 40,000
Referee: Anatoli Kadetov (Soviet Union)

Levski	Beroe

GK	1	(Bulgaria) Tomas Lafchis
DF	2	(Bulgaria) Plamen Nikolov
DF	3	(Bulgaria) Ivan Tishanski
DF	4	(Bulgaria) Stefan Aladzhov
DF	5	(Bulgaria) Nikolay Grancharov
MF	6	(Bulgaria) Todor Barzov
FW	7	(Bulgaria) Voyn Voynov	(substituted off) 46'
MF	8	(Bulgaria) Branimir Kochev
FW	9	(Bulgaria) Rusi Gochev
FW	10	(Bulgaria) Pavel Panov (c)	(substituted off) 70'
MF	11	(Bulgaria) Krasimir Borisov
Substitutes:
FW	--	(Bulgaria) Anton Milkov	(substituted in) 46'
DF	--	(Bulgaria) Vladimir Nikolchev	(substituted in) 70'
Manager:
(Bulgaria) Ivan Vutsov

GK	1	(Bulgaria) Todor Krastev	(substituted off) 64'
DF	2	(Bulgaria) Hristo Belchev
DF	3	(Bulgaria) Tenyo Minchev
DF	4	(Bulgaria) Georgi Georgiev
DF	5	(Bulgaria) Kancho Kasherov
MF	6	(Bulgaria) Georgi Stoyanov
FW	7	(Bulgaria) Tanyo Petrov
MF	8	(Bulgaria) Plamen Lipenski
FW	9	(Bulgaria) Petko Petkov (c)
FW	10	(Bulgaria) Stoycho Mladenov	(substituted off) 64'
MF	11	(Bulgaria) Minko Topuzakov
Substitutes:
GK	--	(Bulgaria) Kosta Kostov	(substituted in) 64'
MF	--	(Bulgaria) Mitko Nikolov	(substituted in) 64'
Manager:
(Bulgaria) Ivan Tanev

== See also ==
- 1978–79 A Group
