= UEFA Euro 1976 qualifying Group 8 =

Football tournament qualification stage

Group 8 of the UEFA Euro 1976 qualifying tournament was one of the eight groups to decide which teams would qualify for the UEFA Euro 1976 finals tournament. Group 8 consisted of four teams: West Germany, Greece, Bulgaria, and Malta, where they played against each other home-and-away in a round-robin format. The group winners were West Germany, who finished two points above Greece.

== Final table ==
Pos	Team	Pld	W	D	L	GF	GA	GD	Pts	Qualification	(West Germany)	(Greece)	(Bulgaria)	(Malta)
1	West Germany	6	3	3	0	14	4	+10	9	Advance to quarter-finals	—	1–1	1–0	8–0
2	Greece	6	2	3	1	12	9	+3	7		2–2	—	2–1	4–0
3	Bulgaria	6	2	2	2	12	7	+5	6		1–1	3–3	—	5–0
4	Malta	6	1	0	5	2	20	−18	2		0–1	2–0	0–2	—

Source: UEFA
Rules for classification: Qualification tiebreakers

== Matches ==
13 October 1974
16:00

Bulgaria	3–3	Greece
Bonev 2'; Denev 27', 29'		Antoniadis 28'; Papaioannou 86'; Glezos 88'

Vasil Levski Stadium, Sofia
Attendance: 14,291*
Referee: Alberto Michelotti** (Italy)

(*)NOTE: Attendance also reported as 30,000.
(**)NOTE: Referee also reported as Alberto Lattanzi.

20 November 1974
16:00

Greece	2–2	West Germany
Delikaris 13'; Eleftherakis 70'		Cullmann 51'; Wimmer 83'

Karaiskakis Stadium, Piraeus
Attendance: 11,425*
Referee: Nicolae Rainea (Romania)

(*)NOTE: Attendance also reported as 22,000

18 December 1974
16:00

Greece	2–1	Bulgaria
Sarafis 4'; Antoniadis 40'		Kolev 89'

Karaiskakis Stadium, Piraeus
Attendance: 22,328
Referee: Paul Schiller (Austria)

22 December 1974
14:30

Malta	0–1	West Germany
		Cullmann 44'

Empire Stadium, Gżira
Attendance: 12,528
Referee: Gyula Emsberger (Hungary)

23 February 1975
15:30

Malta	2–0	Greece
Aquilina 33'; Magro 79'

Empire Stadium, Gżira
Attendance: 8,621
Referee: Bob Matthewson (England)

27 April 1975
17:00

Bulgaria	1–1	West Germany
Kolev 71' (pen.)		Ritschel 75' (pen.)

Vasil Levski Stadium, Sofia
Attendance: 47,200*
Referee: Jean Dubach (Switzerland)

(*)NOTE: Attendance also reported as 60,000.

4 June 1975
21:00

Greece	4–0	Malta
Mavros 32'; Antoniadis 34' (pen.); Iosifidis 47'; Papaioannou 50'

Stadio Toumbas, Salonika
Attendance: 16,545
Referee: Marjan Rauš (Yugoslavia)

11 June 1975
00:00

Bulgaria	5–0	Malta
Dimitrov 2'; Denev 22'; Panov 25'; Bonev 68' (pen.); Milanov 71'

Vasil Levski Stadium, Sofia
Attendance: 27,560
Referee: Michal Jursa (Czechoslovakia)

11 October 1975
20:30

West Germany	1–1	Greece
Heynckes 68'		Delikaris 78'

Rheinstadion, Düsseldorf
Attendance: 61,252
Referee: Clive Thomas (Wales)

19 November 1975
15:00

West Germany	1–0	Bulgaria
Heynckes 64'

Neckarstadion, Stuttgart
Attendance: 68,819
Referee: Alistair McKenzie (Scotland)

21 December 1975
14:30

Malta	0–2	Bulgaria
		Panov 69'; Iordanov 83'

Empire Stadium, Gżira
Attendance: 7,174
Referee: Norbert Rolles (Luxembourg)

28 February 1976
15:30

West Germany	8–0	Malta
Worm 5', 27'; Heynckes 34', 58'; Beer 41' (pen.), 77'; Vogts 82'; Hölzenbein 87'

Westfalenstadion, Dortmund
Attendance: 52,248
Referee: Marian Kustoń (Poland)

== Goalscorers ==
There were 40 goals scored in 12 matches, for an average of 3.33 goals per match.

4 goals

- (Germany national football team) Jupp Heynckes

3 goals

- (Bulgaria national football team) Georgi Denev
- (Greece national football team) Antonis Antoniadis

2 goals

- (Bulgaria national football team) Hristo Bonev
- (Bulgaria national football team) Bozhil Kolev
- (Bulgaria national football team) Pavel Panov
- (Greece national football team) Georgios Delikaris
- (Greece national football team) Mimis Papaioannou
- (Germany national football team) Erich Beer
- (Germany national football team) Bernhard Cullmann
- (Germany national football team) Ronald Worm

1 goal

- (Bulgaria national football team) Borislav Dimitrov
- (Bulgaria national football team) Kiril Milanov
- (Bulgaria national football team) Yordan Yordanov
- (Greece national football team) Kostas Eleftherakis
- (Greece national football team) Lakis Glezos
- (Greece national football team) Konstantinos Iosifidis
- (Greece national football team) Thomas Mavros
- (Greece national football team) Stavros Sarafis
- (Malta national football team) Richard Aquilina
- (Malta national football team) Vincent Magro
- (Germany national football team) Bernd Hölzenbein
- (Germany national football team) Manfred Ritschel
- (Germany national football team) Berti Vogts
- (Germany national football team) Herbert Wimmer
