= Demanuele =

Demanuele is a Maltese surname. Notable people with the surname include:

- Pullu Demanuele (1930–2007), Maltese footballer, uncle of Silvio
- Silvio Demanuele (1961–2026), Maltese footballer, nephew of Pullu
