= 1975–76 Bulgarian Cup =

Tournament details
- Country: Bulgaria

Final positions
- Champions: Levski Sofia (12th cup)
- Runners-up: CSKA Sofia

Tournament statistics
- Top goal scorer(s): A. Zhelyazkov (Slavia) (6 goals)

The 1975–76 Bulgarian Cup was the 36th season of the Bulgarian Cup (in this period the tournament was named Cup of the Soviet Army). Levski Sofia won the competition, beating CSKA Sofia 4–3 after extra time in the final at the Vasil Levski National Stadium.

== First round ==
Team 1	Score	Team 2
1975
Spartak Koynare	1–3	Dunav Ruse
Balkan Belogradchik	2–4	Bdin Vidin
Botev Yoglav	0–3	Dobrudzha Dobrich
Levski Sofia	6–1	Lokomotiv Mezdra
Etar Veliko Tarnovo	2–1	Montana
Botev Plovdiv	5–0	Tryavna
Benkovski Isperih	2–1	Beloslav
Asenovets Asenovgrad	2–0	Levski Lom
Kom Berkovitsa	0–1	Botev Vratsa
Trakia Stamboliyski	0–2	Pavlikeni
Lokomotiv Sofia	4–2	Rozova Dolina
Svilengrad	1–2	Sliven
Orlin Pirdop	1–1 (a.e.t.) (4–2 p)	Chumerna Elena
Marek Dupnitsa	3–1	Balkan Botevgrad
Shumen	3–1	Chavdar Troyan
Rakovski Sevlievo	5–1	Chirpan
Tundzha Yambol	0–0 (a.e.t.) (5–4 p)	Akademik Svishtov
Arda Kardzhali	7–3 (a.e.t.)	Haskovo
Slavia Sofia	4–0	Spartak Pleven
Lokomotiv Ruse	0–1	Yantra Gabrovo
Vihren Sandanski	3–0	Nesebar
Hebar Pazardzhik	1–0	Dimitrovgrad
Spartak Varna	2–1	Beroe Stara Zagora
Lokomotiv GO	3–1	Levski Lyaskovets
Akademik Sofia	2–2 (a.e.t.) (10–9 p)	Minyor Pernik
Slivnishki Geroy	6–3	Belasitsa Petrich
Cherno More Varna	3–1	Stroitel Troyanovo
Litex Lovech	1–3 (a.e.t.)	Pirin Blagoevgrad
Lokomotiv Plovdiv	2–1	Maritsa Plovdiv
Svetkavitsa	1–0	Velbazhd Kyustendil
CSKA Sofia	4–0	Chernomorets Burgas
Rodopa Smolyan	1–2	Levski Karlovo

== Second round ==
Team 1	Score	Team 2
14 February 1976
Slavia Sofia	7–3	Yantra Gabrovo
Lokomotiv Sofia	1–0	Sliven
CSKA Sofia	3–0	Levski Karlovo
Levski Sofia	2–1	Etar Veliko Tarnovo
Pirin Blagoevgrad	1–0	Lokomotiv Plovdiv
Lokomotiv GO	0–1 (a.e.t.)	Akademik Sofia
Dobrudzha Dobrich	1–0	Spartak Varna
Benkovski Isperih	2–1	Asenovets Asenovgrad
Dunav Ruse	4–1	Botev Plovdiv
Botev Vratsa	3–1	Pavlikeni
Vihren Sandanski	2–5	Hebar Pazardzhik
Rakovski Sevlievo	0–1	Shumen
Tundzha Yambol	2–1	Arda Kardzhali
Slivnishki Geroy	2–1	Cherno More Varna
Orlin Pirdop	0–0 (a.e.t.) (4–5 p)	Marek Dupnitsa
Bdin Vidin	3–2	Svetkavitsa

== Third round ==
Team 1	Score	Team 2	Place
20/21 February 1976
Levski Sofia	3–1	Dunav Ruse	Stara Zagora
Slivnishki Geroy	1–0	Pirin Blagoevgrad	Sofia
Slavia Sofia	3–1	Hebar Pazardzhik	Blagoevgrad
Lokomotiv Sofia	1–0(a.e.t.)	Marek Dupnitsa	Sandanski
CSKA Sofia	3–0	Bdin Vidin	Asenovgrad
Akademik Sofia	5–0	Dobrudzha Dobrich	Yambol
Botev Vratsa	2–1 (a.e.t.)	Benkovski Isperih	Kazanlak
Shumen	1–0	Tundzha Yambol	Nova Zagora

== Quarter-finals ==
Team 1	Score	Team 2	Place
7 April 1976
Levski Sofia	3–1	Botev Vratsa	Panagyurishte
Lokomotiv Sofia	1–1 (a.e.t.) (4–3 p)	Shumen	Lovech
Akademik Sofia	1–1 (a.e.t.) (5–4 p)	Slavia Sofia	Sofia
CSKA Sofia	4–0	Slivnishki Geroy	Montana

== Semi-finals ==
Team 1	Score	Team 2	Place
18/19 May 1976
Levski Sofia	3–1	Lokomotiv Sofia	Sofia
CSKA Sofia	4–1	Akademik Sofia	Sofia

== Final ==
=== Details ===
2 June 1976

Levski Sofia	4−3 (a.e.t.)	CSKA Sofia
Yordanov 18'; Panov 21'; Tsvetkov 93', 100'		Kolev 36'; Denev 40'; Goranov 94'

Vasil Levski National Stadium, Sofia
Attendance: 65,000
Referee: Petar Nikolov (Sofia)

Levski	CSKA
