= Emil Spasov =

Bulgarian footballer (born 1956)

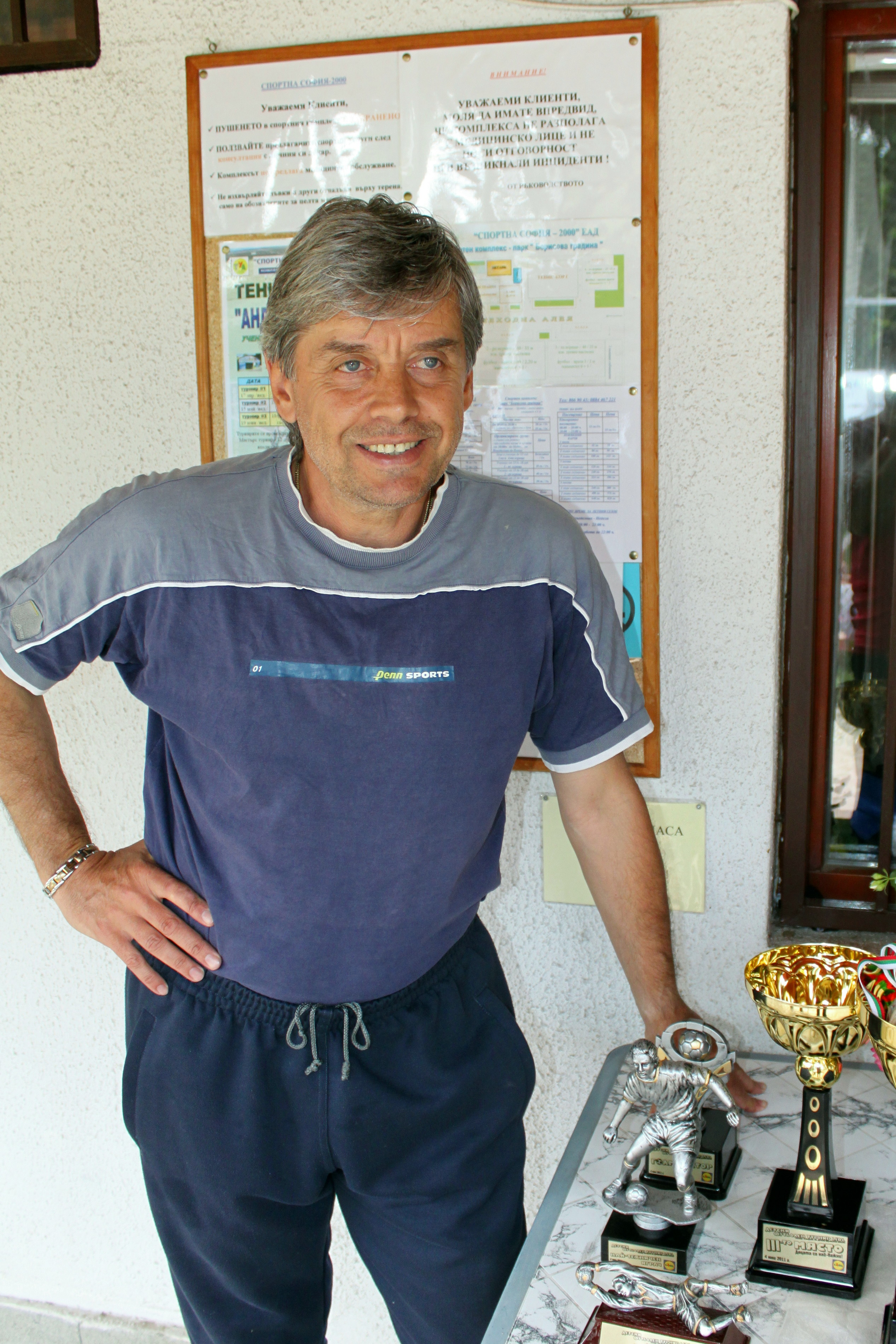

Personal information
- Date of birth: 1 February 1956 (age 70)
- Place of birth: Sofia, Bulgaria
- Height: 1.82 m (6 ft 0 in)
- Positions: Midfielder; forward

Senior career*
Years	Team	Apps	(Gls)
1973–1985	Levski Sofia	285	(78)
1978	→ Spartak Varna (loan)	10	(3)
1986	IK Brage	9	(0)
1986–1987	Royal Antwerp		
1987–1988	Levski Sofia	18	(2)
1988–1989	AC Omonia		
1989–1990	Levski Sofia	10	(1)

International career
1975–1985	Bulgaria	16	(3)
- * Club domestic league appearances and goals

Emil Spasov (Bulgarian: Емил Спасов; born 1 February 1956 in Sofia) is a former Bulgarian footballer who played as a midfielder or striker.

Spasov started his career with Levski Sofia in 1974 and stayed in the club until 1988 with short breaks. During this period he also played for IK Brage in 1985/86 and R. Antwerp F.C. in 1986/87. He returned to his team Levski in 1987 and left after winning another Championship with his team, the following season to play for the Cypriot team AC Omonia, where he won the Cypriot Championship.

In the Bulgarian A Group Spasov played 313 games and scored 82 goals, 68 matches and scored 17 in the Bulgarian Cup and 34 matches (8 in European Champions Cup, 7 in Cup Winners Cup and 19 in UEFA Cup) and scored 13 (1 in European Champions Cup, 3 in Cup Winners Cup and 9 in UEFA Cup) in European competitions with Levski. With his team, he won the Bulgarian Championship 6 times, in 1974, 1977, 1979, 1984, 1985 and 1988 - in which 1977, 1979 and 1984 were doubles - and the Bulgarian Cup 4 times, in 1976, 1977, 1979 and 1984 and he was quarterfinalist of the UEFA Cup in 1976 and also in the Cup Winners' Cup in 1977. Great moment in his career was 1984, when he won the Double with his team and became top goal scorer of Bulgarian First Championship with 19 goals, a title shared with Lokomotiv Plovdiv player Eduard Eranosyan. He played 16 games for the Bulgarian national team and scored three goals, including a 1986 FIFA World Cup qualifying match against Luxembourg on 5 December 1984.

== Honours ==
=== Club ===
Levski

- A Group (6): 1973–74, 1976–77, 1978–79, 1983–84, 1984–85, 1987–88
- Bulgarian Cup (5): 1976, 1977, 1979, 1982, 1984
- Cup of the Soviet Army (3): 1984, 1987, 1988

Omonia

- Cypriot First Division (1): 1988–89
