= Ivkov =

Ivkov (Bulgarian: Ивков) is a Slavic masculine surname, its feminine counterpart is Ivkova. It may refer to

- Borislav Ivkov (1933–2022), Serbian chess Grandmaster
- Kiril Ivkov (1946–2025), Bulgarian football player
