= List of UEFA Cup Winners' Cup top scorers =

- Founded: 1960
- Region: Europe (UEFA)
- Teams: 32 (first round)
- Website: Official website

The UEFA Cup Winners' Cup (CWC) was an annual association football cup competition organized by UEFA since 1960. Prior to 1994 the tournament was officially called the European Cup Winners' Cup. The competition was a straight knockout competition open only to the cup winner club of each country, or the losing finalist, if the winner managed a double. After the establishment of the UEFA Champions League (formerly called the European Champion Clubs' Cup) in the early 1990s, the standing and prestige of the Cup Winners' Cup began to decline. With the expansion of the Champions League in 1997 to allow more than one team from the highest-ranked member associations to enter, the CWC began to look noticeably inferior. By the late 1990s, the CWC had come to be seen as a second-rate competition with only one or two big name teams available to enter each year and the interest in the tournament from both major clubs and the public dropped. Finally, with the further expansion of the UEFA Champions League to include as many as three or four teams from the top footballing nations, the decision was taken to abolish the competition after the end of the 1998–99 tournament, which was won by Lazio.

== All-time top scorers ==
Rank	Player	Goals	Apps	Ratio	Years	Club(s) (Goals)
1	(Netherlands) Rob Rensenbrink	25	36	0.69	1970–1978	Club Brugge (2); Anderlecht (23)
2	(West Germany) Gerd Müller	20	25	0.8	1966–1972	Bayern Munich (20)
2	(Italy) Gianluca Vialli	20	35	0.57	1988–1999	Sampdoria (13); Chelsea (7)
4	(Belgium) François Van der Elst	18	30	0.6	1975–1980	Anderlecht (18)
5	(Belgium) Roger Claessen	17	23	0.74	1965–1972	Standard Liège (16); Beerschot (1)
5	(Austria) Hans Krankl	17	33	0.52	1972–1986	Rapid Wien (8); Barcelona (9)
7	(Portugal) Mendonça	16	23	0.7	1961–1969	Atlético Madrid (14); Barcelona (2)
7	(Sweden) Kurt Hamrin	16	23	0.7	1960–1968	Fiorentina (12); Milan (4)
9	(Poland) Włodzimierz Lubański	15	17	0.88	1969–1971	Górnik Zabrze (15)
9	(Bulgaria) Hristo Stoichkov	15	28	0.54	1988–1997	CSKA Sofia (7); Barcelona (8)
9	(Israel) Alon Mizrahi	15	18	0.83	1993–1999	Maccabi Haifa (15)
12	(West Germany) Lothar Emmerich	14	9	1.56	1965–1966	Borussia Dortmund (14)
12	(England) Peter Osgood	14	18	0.78	1970–1977	Chelsea (12); Southampton (2)
12	(Bulgaria) Kiril Milanov	14	8	1.75	1976–1983	Levski Sofia (13); Lokomotiv Sofia (1)
12	(West Germany) Klaus Allofs	14	39	0.36	1979–1993	Fortuna Düsseldorf (4); 1. FC Köln (4); Marseille (4); Werder Bremen (2)

== Top scorers by season ==
The top scorer award is for the player who amassed the most goals in the tournament.

Season	Player(s)	Club(s)	Goals
1960–61	(Sweden) Kurt Hamrin	(Italy) Fiorentina	6
1961–62	(Hungary) János Göröcs	(Hungary) Újpest	8
1962–63	(Bulgaria) Georgi Asparuhov	(Bulgaria) Botev Plovdiv	6
1962–63	(England) Jimmy Greaves	(England) Tottenham Hotspur	6
1963–64	(Portugal) Mascarenhas	(Portugal) Sporting CP	11
1964–65	(Netherlands) Pierre Kerkhoffs	(Switzerland) Lausanne	6
1964–65	(Czechoslovakia) Václav Mašek	(Czechoslovakia) Sparta Prague	6
1964–65	(Czechoslovakia) Ivan Mráz	(Czechoslovakia) Sparta Prague	6
1965–66	(West Germany) Lothar Emmerich	(West Germany) Borussia Dortmund	14
1966–67	(Belgium) Roger Claessen	(Belgium) Standard Liège	10
1967–68	(West Germany) Uwe Seeler	(West Germany) Hamburger SV	8
1968–69	(West Germany) Carl-Heinz Rühl	(West Germany) 1. FC Köln	6
1969–70	(Poland) Włodzimierz Lubański	(Poland) Górnik Zabrze	7
1970–71	(Poland) Włodzimierz Lubański	(Poland) Górnik Zabrze	8
1971–72	(England) Peter Osgood	(England) Chelsea	8
1972–73	(Italy) Luciano Chiarugi	(Italy) Milan	7
1973–74	(West Germany) Jupp Heynckes	(West Germany) Borussia Mönchengladbach	8
1974–75	(Netherlands) Willy van der Kuijlen	(Netherlands) PSV Eindhoven	8
1975–76	(Netherlands) Rob Rensenbrink	(Belgium) Anderlecht	8
1976–77	(Bulgaria) Kiril Milanov	(Bulgaria) Levski Sofia	13
1977–78	(Netherlands) Ab Gritter	(Netherlands) Twente	6
1977–78	(West Germany) Ferdinand Keller	(West Germany) Hamburger SV	6
1977–78	(Belgium) François Van der Elst	(Belgium) Anderlecht	6
1978–79	(Italy) Alessandro Altobelli	(Italy) Inter Milan	7
1979–80	(Argentina) Mario Kempes	(Spain) Valencia	9
1980–81	(England) David Cross	(England) West Ham United	6
1981–82	(Soviet Union) Ramaz Shengelia	(Soviet Union) Dinamo Tbilisi	6
1981–82	(Belgium) Eddy Voordeckers	(Belgium) Standard Liège	6
1982–83	(Spain) Santillana	(Spain) Real Madrid	8
1983–84	(Soviet Union) Viktor Hrachov	(Soviet Union) Shakhtyor Donetsk	5
1983–84	(Scotland) Mark McGhee	(Scotland) Aberdeen	5
1983–84	(Soviet Union) Serhiy Morozov	(Soviet Union) Shakhtyor Donetsk	5
1984–85	(Soviet Union) Valery Gazzaev	(Soviet Union) Dynamo Moscow	5
1984–85	(Scotland) Andy Gray	(England) Everton	5
1984–85	(Czechoslovakia) Antonín Panenka	(Austria) Rapid Wien	5
1985–86	(Soviet Union) Ihor Belanov	(Soviet Union) Dynamo Kyiv	5
1985–86	(Soviet Union) Oleg Blokhin	(Soviet Union) Dynamo Kyiv	5
1985–86	(East Germany) Frank Lippmann	(East Germany) Dynamo Dresden	5
1985–86	(Soviet Union) Oleksandr Zavarov	(Soviet Union) Dynamo Kyiv	5
1986–87	(Netherlands) John Bosman	(Netherlands) Ajax	8
1987–88	(Brazil) Paulinho Cascavel	(Portugal) Sporting CP	6
1988–89	(Bulgaria) Hristo Stoichkov	(Bulgaria) CSKA Sofia	7
1989–90	(Italy) Gianluca Vialli	(Italy) Sampdoria	7
1990–91	(Italy) Roberto Baggio	(Italy) Juventus	9
1991–92	(Hungary) Péter Lipcsei	(Hungary) Ferencváros	6
1992–93	(Belgium) Alexandre Czerniatynski	(Belgium) Antwerp	7
1993–94	(Bulgaria) Ivaylo Andonov	(Bulgaria) CSKA Sofia	5
1993–94	(Scotland) Eoin Jess	(Scotland) Aberdeen	5
1993–94	(Germany) Ulf Kirsten	(Germany) Bayer Leverkusen	5
1993–94	(Israel) Alon Mizrahi	(Israel) Maccabi Haifa	5
1994–95	(England) Ian Wright	(England) Arsenal	9
1995–96	(Czech Republic) Petr Samec	(Czech Republic) Hradec Králové	9
1996–97	(England) Robbie Fowler	(England) Liverpool	7
1997–98	(Italy) Pasquale Luiso	(Italy) Vicenza	8
1998–99	(Israel) Alon Mizrahi	(Israel) Maccabi Haifa	7

Source: RSSSF

=== By player ===
Rank	Player	Titles	Goals	Seasons
1	(Poland) Włodzimierz Lubański	2	15	1969–70, 1970–71
1	(Israel) Alon Mizrahi	2	12	1993–94*, 1998–99

- ^{*} Two or more players were equal top scorers.
- List is ordered by date of accomplishment.

=== By club ===
Rank	Club	Titles	Goals	Seasons
1	(Ukraine) Dynamo Kyiv (Note: In the 1985–86 season, three Dynamo Kyiv players were joint top scorers.)	3	15	1985–86*, 1985–86*, 1985–86*
2	(Czech Republic) Sparta Prague (Note: In the 1964–65 season, two Sparta Prague players were joint top scorers.)	2	12	1964–65*, 1964–65*
2	(Germany) Hamburger SV	2	14	1967–68, 1977–78*
2	(Poland) Górnik Zabrze	2	15	1969–70, 1970–71
2	(Belgium) Anderlecht	2	14	1975–76, 1977–78*
2	(Belgium) Standard Liège	2	16	1966–67, 1981–82*
2	(Ukraine) Shakhtyor Donetsk (Note: In the 1983–84 season, two Shakhtyor Donetsk players were joint top scorers.)	2	10	1983–84*, 1983–84*
2	(Portugal) Sporting CP	2	17	1963–64, 1987–88
2	(Scotland) Aberdeen	2	12	1983–84*, 1993–94*
2	(Bulgaria) CSKA Sofia	2	12	1988–89, 1993–94*
2	(Israel) Maccabi Haifa	2	12	1993–94*, 1998–99

- ^{*} Two or more players were equal top scorers.
- List is ordered by date of accomplishment.

=== By country ===
Rank	Country	Titles	Goals	Seasons
1	Germany (Note: Includes West Germany but not East Germany.)	5	42	1965–66, 1967–68, 1968–69, 1973–74, 1977–78*, 1994–95*
1	Ukraine (Note: In the 1983–84 season, two Ukrainian players were joint top scorers, and in the 1985–86 season, three Ukrainians players were joint top scorers.)	5	25	1983–84*, 1983–84*, 1985–86*, 1985–86*, 1985–86*
1	Netherlands	5	36	1964–65*, 1974–75, 1975–76, 1977–78*, 1986–87
1	England	5	36	1962–63*, 1971–72, 1980–81, 1994–95, 1996–97
1	Italy	5	38	1972–73, 1978–79, 1989–90, 1990–91, 1997–98
6	Belgium	4	29	1966–67, 1977–78*, 1981–82*, 1992–93
6	Bulgaria	4	31	1962–63*, 1976–77, 1988–89, 1993–94*
6	Czech Republic (Note: In the 1964–65 season, two Czech players were joint top scorers.)	4	26	1964–65*, 1964–65*, 1984–85*, 1995–96
9	Scotland	3	15	1983–84*, 1984–85*, 1993–94*
10	Poland	2	15	1969–70, 1970–71
10	Hungary	2	14	1961–62, 1991–92*
10	Israel	2	12	1993–94*, 1998–99

- ^{*} Two or more players were equal top scorers.
- List is ordered by date of accomplishment.

== See also ==
- List of UEFA Cup and Europa League top scorers
- List of UEFA Champions League top scorers
