= 1976–77 Bulgarian Cup =

Tournament details
- Country: Bulgaria

Final positions
- Champions: Levski Sofia (13th cup)
- Runners-up: Lokomotiv Sofia

Tournament statistics
- Top goal scorer(s): Nikola Hristov (Dunav) (7 goals)

The 1976–77 Bulgarian Cup was the 37th season of the Bulgarian Cup (in this period the tournament was named Cup of the Soviet Army). Levski Sofia won the competition, beating Lokomotiv Sofia 2–1 in the final at the Vasil Levski National Stadium.

== First round ==
Team 1	Score	Team 2
15 December 1976
Zavod Iskra	0–3	Rodopa Smolyan
Zagorets Nova Zagora	0–5	Levski Sofia
Svetkavitsa	3–2 (a.e.t.)	Chepinets Velingrad
Haskovo	0–3	Lokomotiv Plovdiv
Pirin Blagoevgrad	7–2	Chernomorets Balchik
CSKA Sofia	4–0	Shumen
Dimitrovgrad	6–1	Trakia Stamboliyski
Nesebar	0–4	Beroe Stara Zagora
Lokomotiv Mezdra	5–3	Rozova Dolina
Lencho Yakimovo	1–3	Akademik Sofia
Chirpan	3–1	Litex Lovech
Spartak Varna	4–0	Veselinovo
Beloslav	3–0	Yantra Gabrovo
Sliven	3–1	Cherno More Varna
Levski Karlovo	1–3	Minyor Bobov Dol
Gigant Belene	2–4 (a.e.t.)	Akademik Svishtov
Botev Ihtiman	3–0	Chernomorets Burgas
Dorostol Silistra	2–0	Preslav
Dunav Ruse	4–1	Asenovets Asenovgrad
Slivnishki Geroy	2–0	Botev Vratsa
Arda Kardzhali	0–3	Dobrudzha Dobrich
Botev Plovdiv	2–1	P. Hitov Tutrakan
Spartak Pleven	6–0	Kom Berkovitsa
Lokomotiv Sofia	2–0	Chavdar Troyan
Balkan Botevgrad	6–0	Montana
Belasitsa Petrich	3–1	Marek Dupnitsa
Orlin Pirdop	0–0 (a.e.t.) (6–4 p)	Pavlikeni
Etar Veliko Tarnovo	2–3	Slavia Sofia
Tundzha Yambol	4–2	Lokomotiv GO
Benkovski Isperih	3–0	Maritsa Plovdiv
Velbazhd Kyustendil	3–1	Bdin Vidin
Ludogorets Razgrad	0–0 (a.e.t.) (5–3 p)	Minyor Pernik

== Second round ==
Team 1	Score	Team 2
18 December 1976
Rodopa Smolyan	0–2	Levski Sofia
Svetkavitsa	1–3 (a.e.t.)	Lokomotiv Plovdiv
Pirin Blagoevgrad	2–0	Dimitrovgrad
CSKA Sofia	4–2	Velbazhd Kyustendil
Beroe Stara Zagora	6–1	Lokomotiv Mezdra
Akademik Sofia	2–0	Chirpan
Beloslav	1–2	Spartak Varna
Sliven	4–2	Minyor Bobov Dol
Akademik Svishtov	3–2	Botev Ihtiman
Dorostol Silistra	1–4	Dunav Ruse
Slivnishki Geroy	2–0	Dobrudzha Dobrich
Spartak Pleven	4–1 (a.e.t.)	Botev Plovdiv
Lokomotiv Sofia	3–1	Balkan Botevgrad
Belasitsa Petrich	4–3 (a.e.t.)	Orlin Pirdop
Tundzha Yambol	3–0	Ludogorets Razgrad
Slavia Sofia	5–0	Benkovski Isperih

== Third round ==
Team 1	Score	Team 2	Place
12 February 1977
Levski Sofia	4–1	Lokomotiv Plovdiv	Blagoevgrad
Beroe Stara Zagora	1–0	Akademik Sofia	Velingrad
Pirin Blagoevgrad	3–2	CSKA Sofia	Pazardzhik
Lokomotiv Sofia	2–0	Belasitsa Petrich	Kyustendil
Sliven	1–1 (a.e.t.) (5–2 p)	Spartak Varna	Haskovo
Dunav Ruse	3–0	Akademik Svishtov	Sandanski
Spartak Pleven	1–0	Slivnishki Geroy	Stara Zagora
Slavia Sofia	1–0	Tundzha Yambol	Sopot

== Quarter-finals ==
Team 1	Score	Team 2	Place
27 April 1977
Lokomotiv Sofia	0–0 (a.e.t.) (3–0 p)	Slavia Sofia	Sofia
Levski Sofia	3–1	Pirin Blagoevgrad	Plovdiv
Beroe Stara Zagora	1–0	Sliven	Nova Zagora
Dunav Ruse	0–0 (a.e.t.) (4–3 p)	Spartak Pleven	Gorna Oryahovitsa

== Semi-finals ==
Team 1	Score	Team 2	Place
4 May 1977
Levski Sofia	3–0	Beroe Stara Zagora	Veliko Tarnovo
Lokomotiv Sofia	1–1 (a.e.t.) (5–3 p)	Dunav Ruse	Pleven

== Final ==
=== Details ===
12 June 1977

Levski Sofia	2−1	Lokomotiv Sofia
Voynov 15'; Yordanov 51'		Zdravkov 76'

Vasil Levski National Stadium, Sofia
Attendance: 45,000
Referee: Atanas Mateev (Varna)

Levski	Lokomotiv
