= John Mintoff =

Maltese footballer

Personal information
- Date of birth: 23 August 1988 (age 38)
- Position: Midfielder

Team information
- Current team: Gudja United
- Number: 7

Senior career*
Years	Team	Apps	(Gls)
2005–2022	Sliema Wanderers	229	(7)
2007–2008	→ Mqabba (loan)	20	(0)
2011–2012	→ Floriana (loan)	29	(2)
2015–2016	→ Tarxien Rainbows (loan)	8	(0)
2022–	Gudja United	15	(0)

International career^{‡}
2012–2019	Malta	10	(0)
- * Club domestic league appearances and goals as of 25 June 2023 ‡ National team caps and goals as of 23:59, 5 February 2023 (UTC)

John Mintoff (born 23 August 1988) is a Maltese international footballer who plays for Gudja United as a midfielder.

== Career ==
Mintoff spent most of his career at Sliema Wanderers, appearing in 229 matches over 15 seasons with the club. He spent time on loan at Mqabba, Floriana and Tarxien Rainbows before moving to Gudja United permanently in 2022.

He made his international debut for Malta in 2012. He has appeared for them in FIFA World Cup qualifying matches.
