= Gancho Peev =

Bulgarian footballer

Personal information
- Full name: Gancho Peev Peev
- Date of birth: 14 March 1947 (age 79)
- Place of birth: Plovdiv, Bulgaria
- Position: Defender

Senior career*
Years	Team	Apps	(Gls)
1964–1965	Sliven	20	(1)
1966–1981	Lokomotiv Plovdiv	327	(1)

International career
1973	Bulgaria	1	(0)
- * Club domestic league appearances and goals

Gancho Peev Peev (Bulgarian: Ганчо Пеев Пеев; born 14 March 1947) is a former Bulgarian footballer who played as a defender. He is legendary player of Lokomotiv Plovdiv and have 327 appearances and 1 goal in A PFG for the club. Gancho Peev is also "Sportsman №1 of Bulgaria" for 1978 and "Master of Sports" since 1976. Peev is a vice-champion of Bulgaria for 1973, with two more bronze medals won - in 1969 and 1974. He has played 11 games in the UEFA Cup for Lokomotiv Plovdiv.

He has played in 1 game for the national team of Bulgaria in 1973.
