= Adam Magri Overend =

Maltese footballer

Personal information
- Full name: Adam Magri Overend
- Date of birth: 3 May 2000 (age 26)
- Place of birth: Malta
- Height: 1.78 m (5 ft 10 in)
- Position: Midfielder

Team information
- Current team: Sliema Wanderers
- Number: 7

Youth career
- St. Andrews

Senior career*
Years	Team	Apps	(Gls)
2019	St. Andrews	1	(0)
2019–2021	St. Lucia	27	(2)
2021–2024	Floriana	58	(1)
2024–	Sliema Wanderers	65	(3)

International career^{‡}
2018	Malta U19	5	(0)
2021	Malta U21	4	(0)
2021–	Malta	12	(0)
- * Club domestic league appearances and goals as of 18 May 2026 ‡ National team caps and goals as of 18:90, 31 March 2026 (UTC)

Adam Magri Overend (born 3 May 2000) is a Maltese professional footballer who plays as a midfielder for Sliema Wanderers and the Malta national team.

== International career ==
He made his debut for the Malta national football team in their 0–4 loss against Slovenia in a World Cup qualifier on 8 October 2021.
