= Vincent Magro =

Maltese footballer

Vince Magro
Personal information
- Full name: Vincent Magro
- Date of birth: 24 July 1952 (age 74)
- Place of birth: Valletta, Malta
- Position: Right winger

Youth career
- Valletta Vanguards

Senior career*
Years	Team	Apps	(Gls)
1970–1984	Valletta	152	(45)
1981-1982	→ Msida Saint-Joseph (loan)	6	(1)
1982–1984	Valletta	10	(1)
1984-1987	Luxol St. Andrew's	10	(5)
1987-1988	Santa Venera Lightnings	4	(1)
Total		182	(53)

International career^{‡}
1974–1979	Malta	23	(2)
1973	Malta XI	1	(0)
- * Club domestic league appearances and goals as of 28 July 2024 ‡ National team caps and goals as of 28 July 2024

Vince Magro (born 24 July 1952) is a retired footballer, who represented the Malta national team.

== Club career ==
Small and stocky built, Magro made his debut for hometown club Valletta in February 1970 against Sliema Wanderers and won 4 league titles and 3 domestic cups with the club. He had quickly established a good understanding with teammate Carlo Seychell to bring back successes to Valletta, but after an injury-hit season he was loaned to second-tier Msida Saint-Joseph in 1981.

== International career ==
Nicknamed il-Maxi, Magro made his debut for Malta in a September 1973 friendly match against Canada and earned a total of 24 caps (including 1 unofficial), scoring 2 goals. One of his goals was in a famous win over Greece in 1975, Malta's first-ever competitive game win. His final international was an October 1979 European Championship qualification match against Turkey.

== Career statistics ==
=== International ===
Appearances and goals by national team and year
National team	Year	Apps	Goals
Malta	1973	1	0
Malta	1974	3	0
Malta	1975	4	1
Malta	1976	4	1
Malta	1977	6	0
Malta	1978	1	0
Malta	1979	5	0
Total		24	2

Scores and results list Malta's goal tally first, score column indicates score after each Magro goal.

List of international goals scored by Vincent Magro
No.	Date	Venue	Opponent	Score	Result	Competition	Ref.
1	23 February 1975	Empire Stadium, Gżira, Malta	Greece	2–0	2–0	UEFA Euro 1976 qualification	
2	24 November 1976	Empire Stadium, Gżira, Malta	Tunisia	1–0	1–1	Friendly	

== Honours ==
FC Valletta

- Maltese Premier League: 4

1974, 1978, 1980, 1984

- FA Trophy: 3

1975, 1977, 1978
