= Louis Arpa =

Maltese footballer

Personal information
- Date of birth: 2 August 1949 (age 77)
- Place of birth: Floriana, Crown Colony of Malta
- Position: Striker

Youth career
- 1961-1966: Floriana

Senior career*
Years	Team	Apps	(Gls)
1966–1978	Floriana	129	(42)

International career
1969-1977	Malta	17	(0)
1969-1977	Malta XI	1	(1)
- * Club domestic league appearances and goals

Louis Arpa (born 2 August 1949) is a Maltese retired footballer.

== Club career ==
He started playing football at hometown club Floriana aged 12 and never played for another team. He was part of a team featuring the likes of Willie Vassallo, Raymond Xuereb and his brother George Xuereb and Edwin Farrugia.

== International career ==
Arpa made his debut for Malta in an April 1969 friendly match against Austria and earned a total of 18 caps (1 unofficial), scoring 1 goal which he netted against Canada. His final international was a November 1977 World Cup qualification match against Turkey.

== Personal life ==
Born to Alfred Arpa and Domenica Micallef, Louis has three sons himself with two different women.

== Honours ==
- Maltese Premier League: 4

1968, 1970, 1973, 1975

- FA Trophy: 3

1967, 1972, 1976
