= Iliya Bekyarov =

Bulgarian footballer (1938–2015)

Personal information
- Full name: Iliya Bekyarov
- Date of birth: 5 May 1938
- Place of birth: Plovdiv, Bulgaria
- Date of death: 12 August 2015 (aged 77)
- Place of death: Plovdiv, Bulgaria
- Position: Defender

Senior career*
Years	Team	Apps	(Gls)
1959–1973	Lokomotiv Plovdiv	314	(3)

International career
1969	Bulgaria	2	(0)
- * Club domestic league appearances and goals

Iliya Bekyarov (Bulgarian: Илия Бекяров; 5 May 1938 - 12 August 2015) was a Bulgarian footballer who played as a defender. He is legendary player of Lokomotiv Plovdiv and have 314 appearances and 3 goals in A PFG for the club. He has played 20 games in the UEFA Cup for Lokomotiv Plovdiv.

Iliya Bekyarov is a vice-champion of Bulgaria for 1973, with one more bronze medal won - in 1969.

He has played in 2 games for the national team of Bulgaria in 1969.
