= Ivan Stoyanov (footballer, born 1949) =

Bulgarian footballer

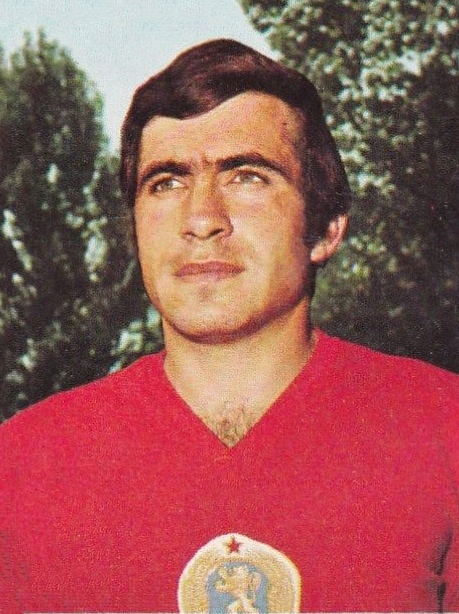

Personal information
- Full name: Ivan Georgiev Stoyanov
- Date of birth: 20 January 1949
- Place of birth: Sofia, Bulgaria
- Date of death: 10 December 2017 (aged 68)
- Position: Midfielder

Senior career*
Years	Team	Apps	(Gls)
1967–1968	Spartak Sofia		
1968–1977	Levski Sofia	154	(3)

International career
1972–1979	Bulgaria	19	(0)
- * Club domestic league appearances and goals

Ivan Georgiev Stoyanov (Bulgarian: Иван Георгиев Cтoянoв; 20 January 1949 – 10 December 2017) was a Bulgarian footballer who played as a midfielder for Bulgaria in the 1974 FIFA World Cup. He also played for Spartak Sofia and Levski Sofia.

== Death ==
His death was announced on December 10, 2017, aged 68.

== Honours ==
Spartak Sofia

- Bulgarian Cup: 1967–68

Levski Sofia

- Bulgarian A Group (3): 1969–70, 1973–74, 1976–77
- Bulgarian Cup (4): 1969–70, 1970–71, 1975–76, 1976–77
