= Boko Dimitrov =

Bulgarian footballer (1951–2013)

Personal information
- Full name: Borislav Georgiev Dimitrov
- Date of birth: 11 November 1951
- Place of birth: Bulgaria
- Date of death: 28 March 2013 (aged 61)
- Place of death: Bulgaria
- Height: 1.78 m (5 ft 10 in)
- Position: Defender

Senior career*
Years	Team	Apps	(Gls)
1971–1973	Rodopa Smolyan	?	(?)
1973–1981	Lokomotiv Sofia	228	(9)
1981–1983	Iraklis	41	(4)

International career
1974–1982	Bulgaria	31	(2)
- * Club domestic league appearances and goals

Borislav Georgiev Dimitrov (Bulgarian: Борислав Георгиев Димитров; 11 November 1951 – 28 March 2013), commonly known as Boko Dimitrov (Bulgarian: Боко Димитров), was a Bulgarian footballer who played as a defender. He made 31 appearances for the Bulgaria national team.

== Career ==
Dimitrov made his debut for Bulgaria on 25 September 1974 in a friendly match against Romania, which finished as a 0–0 draw. He went on to make 31 appearances, scoring 2 goals, before making his last appearance on 14 April 1982 in a friendly match against Romania, which finished as a 1–2 loss.

== Career statistics ==
=== International ===
Bulgaria
Year	Apps	Goals
1974	3	0
1975	7	2
1976	7	0
1977	1	0
1978	3	0
1979	3	0
1980	5	0
1981	1	0
1982	1	0
Total	31	2

=== International goals ===
No.	Date	Venue	Opponent	Score	Result	Competition
1	11 June 1975	Vasil Levski Stadium, Sofia, Bulgaria	Malta	1–0	5–0	UEFA Euro 1976 qualifying
2	24 September 1975	İnönü Stadium, Istanbul, Turkey	Turkey	2–0	2–0	1976 Summer Olympics football qualification

== Honours ==
Lokomotiv Sofia

- Bulgarian League: 1977–78
