= Pullu Demanuele =

Maltese footballer (1929–2007)

Personal information
- Full name: Publius Demanuele
- Date of birth: 22 February 1930
- Place of birth: Floriana, Malta
- Date of death: 20 March 2007 (aged 77)
- Place of death: Floriana, Malta
- Position: Outside left

Senior career*
Years	Team	Apps	(Gls)
1946–1964	Floriana		
1964–1965	Marsa		

International career
1957–1961	Malta	8	(3)
- * Club domestic league appearances and goals

Publius "Pullu" Demanuele (22 February 1930 – 20 March 2007) was a Maltese footballer who played as an outside left.

He spent most of his career with Floriana, winning the Maltese Premier League seven times and the Maltese FA Trophy eight times. He was the league's top scorer in two seasons.

Demanuele played eight games for Malta between 1957 and 1961, scoring three goals. He played in their first international match, and scored two goals in their first victory.

== Club career ==
Born in Floriana and known as "Il-Koku", Demanuele made his debut for his hometown club Floriana F.C. in 1946. He spent 18 years there, playing 190 games and scoring 101 goals, as well as winning the Maltese Premier League seven times, and the Maltese FA Trophy eight times. Floriana were league champions four consecutive times between 1950 and 1953, and Demanuele was twice the league's top scorer.

In the 1950s, Demanuele visited London while a friend was on trial at Arsenal. Through Ian Black, a Fulham goalkeeper who had played for Floriana while on national service in Malta, he got a trial at the Craven Cottage club. He scored two goals for the reserve team but declined a contract offer because he did not want to leave Floriana.

On 18 September 1962, in the first round of the European Cup, captain Demanuele scored a consolation goal for Floriana in a 4–1 home loss to Ipswich Town. A week later, in the second leg at Portman Road, the English champions won 10–0.

After one season in the Maltese Second Division with Marsa, Demanuele retired in 1965.

== International career ==
Before Malta had full international status in football, Demanuele represented the Malta Football Association in matches against foreign clubs. He made his debut for the Malta national team in their first match, a 3–2 friendly loss to Austria at the Empire Stadium in Gżira on 24 February 1957. The following 25 January, he scored twice in a 3–0 win over Denmark at the same venue, his country's first win. He made eight appearances and scored three goals, ending with a 5–0 loss away to Norway on 3 July 1962.

== Death ==
On 24 February 2007, Demanuele and his former teammates attended a match against Austria to mark the 50th anniversary of Malta's debut in international football. He died in his hometown on 20 March, aged 77.

Demanuele's son Patrick, who was known by the same nickname, played for Floriana in the late 1980s alongside cousins Joe and Silvio. He died in 2021, aged 53.
