= Richard Aquilina =

Maltese footballer

Ritchie Aquilina
Personal information
- Full name: Richard Aquilina
- Date of birth: 5 February 1953
- Place of birth: Sliema, Malta
- Date of death: 9 January 2006 (aged 52)
- Place of death: Sliema, Malta
- Position: Midfielder

Senior career*
Years	Team	Apps	(Gls)
1972–1983	Sliema Wanderers	159	(45)
1983–1986	Melita	29	(8)
1986	Tarxien Rainbows	3	(0)
1987	Melita	8	(0)
1987–1988	Naxxar Lions	14	(2)
1990	Luxol St. Andrews	4	(0)
1991–1992	Qormi	9	(1)
Total		226	(56)

International career
1974-1978	Malta	8	(1)
- * Club domestic league appearances and goals

Richard Aquilina (5 February 1953 - 9 January 2006) was a Maltese international footballer.

== Club career ==
During his career, Aquilina played the most seasons for hometown club Sliema Wanderers as a midfielder. He was Maltese Premier League top goalscorer in the 1975/76 season.

He died in Capua Hospital in 2006 after a long illness.

== International career ==
Aquilina made his debut for Malta in a December 1974 European Championship qualification match against West Germany and earned a total of 8 caps (1 goal). His final international was another European Championship qualification match, away against Wales, on 25 October 1978.

== Honours ==
Sliema Wanderers

- Maltese Premier League: 1972,1976
- Maltese FA Trophy: 1974
