= Yordan Yordanov (footballer, born 1951) =

Bulgarian footballer and manager

Personal information
- Full name: Yordan Dimitrov Yordanov
- Date of birth: 28 September 1951 (age 75)
- Place of birth: Musachevo, Bulgaria
- Position: Forward

Youth career
- –1972: Levski Sofia

Senior career*
Years	Team	Apps	(Gls)
1972–1973	Levski Sofia	4	(1)
1973–1974	Karpachev Lovech		
1974–1975	Minyor Pernik	29	(8)
1975–1981	Levski Sofia	139	(50)
1983–1984	Anorthosis		

International career
1975–1980	Bulgaria	6	(4)

Managerial career
- 1994–1995: Anorthosis Famagusta
- * Club domestic league appearances and goals

Yordan Dimitrov Yordanov (Bulgarian: Йордан Димитров Йорданов; born 28 September 1951), nicknamed "Pikata" (Bulgarian: Пиката), is a Bulgarian former football player and manager who played as a forward and made six appearances for the Bulgaria national team. He is a two times Bulgarian champion (1977, 1979) and three times Bulgarian Cup holder (1976, 1977, 1979). In 1976, he scored two goals against FC Barcelona for the famous Levski's 5 – 4 win in Sofia.

== Career ==
Yordanov made his international debut for Bulgaria on 21 December 1975 in a UEFA Euro 1976 qualifying match against Malta, in which he scored the second goal of the 2–0 away win. He went on to make six appearances, scoring four goals, before making his last appearance on 2 April 1980 in a friendly match against Hungary, which finished as a 4–3 win.

== Career statistics ==
=== International ===
Bulgaria
Year	Apps	Goals
1975	1	1
1976	3	3
1977	1	0
1980	1	0
Total	6	4

=== International goals ===
No.	Date	Venue	Opponent	Score	Result	Competition
1	21 December 1975	Empire Stadium, Gżira, Malta	Malta	2–0	2–0	UEFA Euro 1976 qualifying
2	14 April 1976	Beroe Stadium, Stara Zagora, Bulgaria	Turkey	2–0	3–0	1976 Summer Olympics qualification
3	14 April 1976	Beroe Stadium, Stara Zagora, Bulgaria	Turkey	3–0	3–0	1976 Summer Olympics qualification
4	17 August 1976	Stadion Allmend, Lucerne, Switzerland	Switzerland	2–2	2–2	Friendly
