= Kiril Ivkov =

Bulgarian footballer (1946–2025)

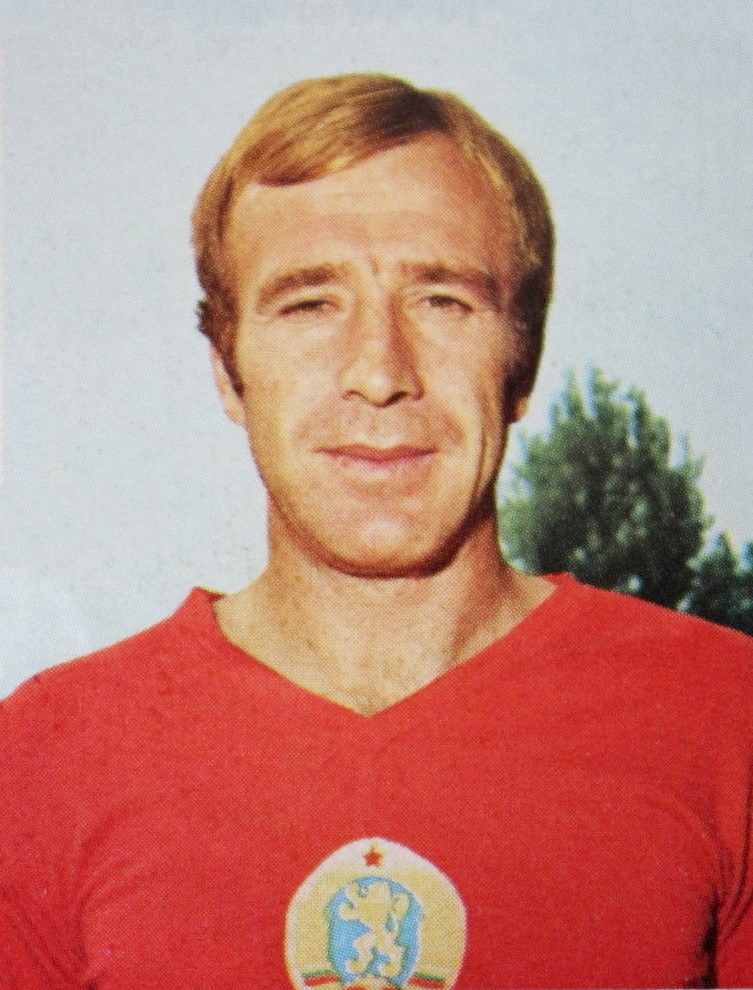
- Ivkov in 1974

Personal information
- Full name: Kiril Lozanov Ivkov
- Date of birth: 21 June 1946
- Place of birth: Pernik, Bulgaria
- Date of death: 24 May 2025 (aged 78)
- Height: 1.79 m (5 ft 10 in)
- Position: Defender

Senior career*
| Years | Team | Apps | (Gls) |
| 1962–1965 | Metalurg Pernik | | |
| 1965–1967 | Minyor Pernik | 63 | (1) |
| 1967–1978 | Levski Sofia | 293 | (9) |
| 1978–1979 | Etar Veliko Tarnovo | | |

International career
| 1968–1979 | Bulgaria | 44 | (1) |

Managerial career
- 1980–1982: Bulgaria (assistant)
- 1985–1986: Levski Sofia
- 1988–1989: Osam Lovech
- 1991–1992: Sliven
- 1993: Spartak Varna
- 1998–1999: Etar Veliko Tarnovo
Medal record
Representing Bulgaria
Olympic Games
| Silver medal – second place | 1968 Mexico City | Team competition |
- * Club domestic league appearances and goals

Kiril Lozanov Ivkov (Bulgarian: Кирил Лoзaнoв Ивков; 21 June 1946 – 24 May 2025) was a Bulgarian footballer who played as a defender, most notably for Levski Sofia. In 1974 and 1975 he was named Bulgarian Footballer of the Year.

Ivkov made his Bulgaria debut in 1968, earning 44 caps and scoring one goal over an eleven-year international career. He was part of the squad for the 1968 Summer Olympics, where Bulgaria won the silver medal. Ivkov captained his country 10 times and played in the 1974 FIFA World Cup.

== Club career ==
Born in Pernik, Ivkov began his career at local club Metalurg. In 1966, he left to join top league side Minyor Pernik. After one season at Minyor, Ivkov joined Levski Sofia where he won four Bulgarian League titles and four Bulgarian Cups. He spent eleven years at Levski, scoring 15 goals in 375 appearances in all competitions.

== Death ==
Ivkov died on 24 May 2025, at the age of 78.

== Honours ==
=== Player ===
Levski Sofia

- Bulgarian League: 1967–68, 1969–70, 1973–74, 1976–77
- Bulgarian Cup: 1969–70, 1970–71, 1975–76, 1976–77

Bulgaria

- Silver Medal at the Summer Olympic Games: 1968

Individual

- Bulgarian Footballer of the Year: 1974, 1975

=== Manager ===
Levski Sofia

- Bulgarian Cup: 1985–86
