= Krasimir Borisov =

Bulgarian footballer

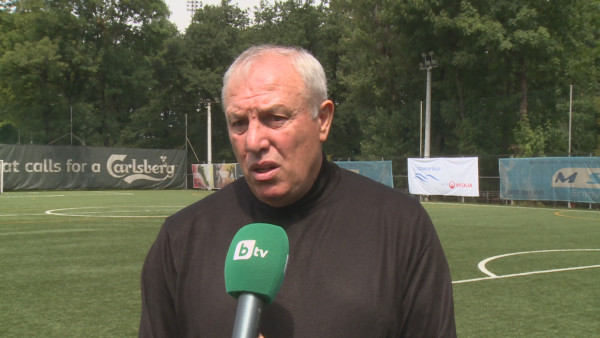

Personal information
- Full name: Krasimir Borisov Georgiev
- Date of birth: 8 April 1950 (age 76)
- Place of birth: Sofia, Bulgaria
- Position: Midfielder

Senior career*
Years	Team	Apps	(Gls)
1968–1969	Lokomotiv Sofia	5	(0)
1969–1971	Akademik Sofia	24	(0)
1971–1974	Lokomotiv Sofia	79	(9)
1974–1981	Levski Sofia	118	(19)
1981–1984	AC Omonia		

International career
1973–1979	Bulgaria	19	(2)
- * Club domestic league appearances and goals

Krasimir Borisov Georgiev (Bulgarian: Кpacимиp Бopиcoв Георгиев; born 8 April 1950) is a former Bulgarian football midfielder who played for Bulgaria in the 1974 FIFA World Cup. He also played for Levski Sofia, Lokomotiv Sofia and AC Omonia. Krasimir Borisov was assistant coach of Dimitar Penev during the 1994 FIFA World Cup, where Bulgaria won bronze medal for its fourth place.

== Honours ==
Levski Sofia

- Bulgarian champion: 1976–77, 1978–79
- Bulgarian Cup: 1975–76, 1976–77, 1978–79

Lokomotiv Sofia

- 1973 Balkans Cup winner

Omonia Nicosia

- Cypriot First Division: 1982, 1983, 1984
- Cypriot Cup: 1982, 1983

International

- 1973–76 Balkan Cup winner with Bulgaria
