= FC Slivnishki Geroy Slivnitsa =

Bulgarian football club

Slivnishki Geroy
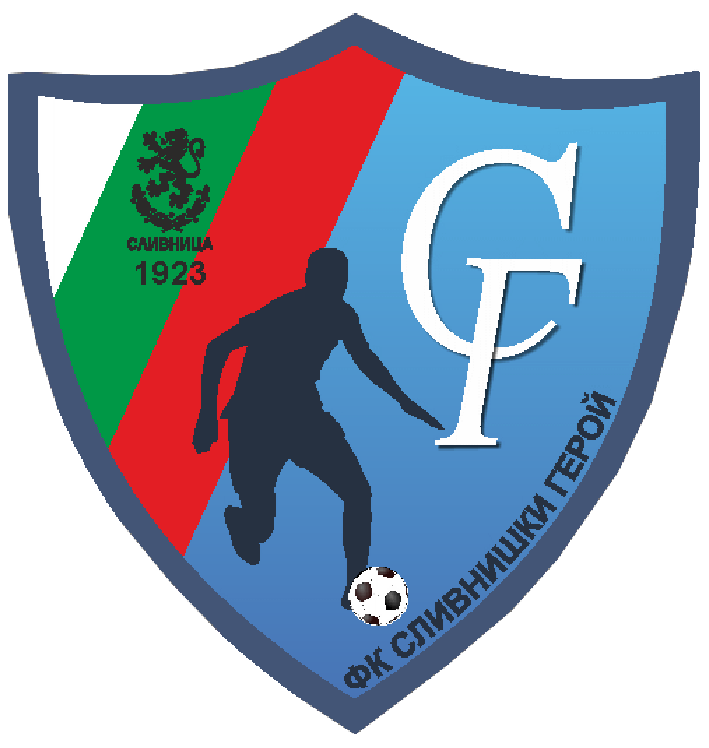
- Full name: Football Club Slivnishki Geroy
- Founded: 1923; 103 years ago
- Ground: Slivnishki Geroy Stadium
- Capacity: 7,000
- Chairman: Ventsislav Balikov
- Manager: Nikolai Hristozov
- League: South-West Third League
- 2025–26: South-West Third League, 14th of 18
- Website: slivnishki-geroi.com
Home colours	Away colours

Football Club Slivnishki Geroy (Bulgarian: ФК "Сливнишки герой", lit. 'FC Hero of Slivnitsa') is a Bulgarian association football club based in Slivnitsa, Sofia Province, which competes in the South-West Third League. Their home ground since 1966 has been Slivnishki Geroy Stadium. The club has played in its traditional blue and white stripes throughout most of its history.

== Honours ==
- B PFG
  - Fourth place: 1974–75
- South-West V AFG
  - Champions (2): 1969–70, 2010–11

== History ==
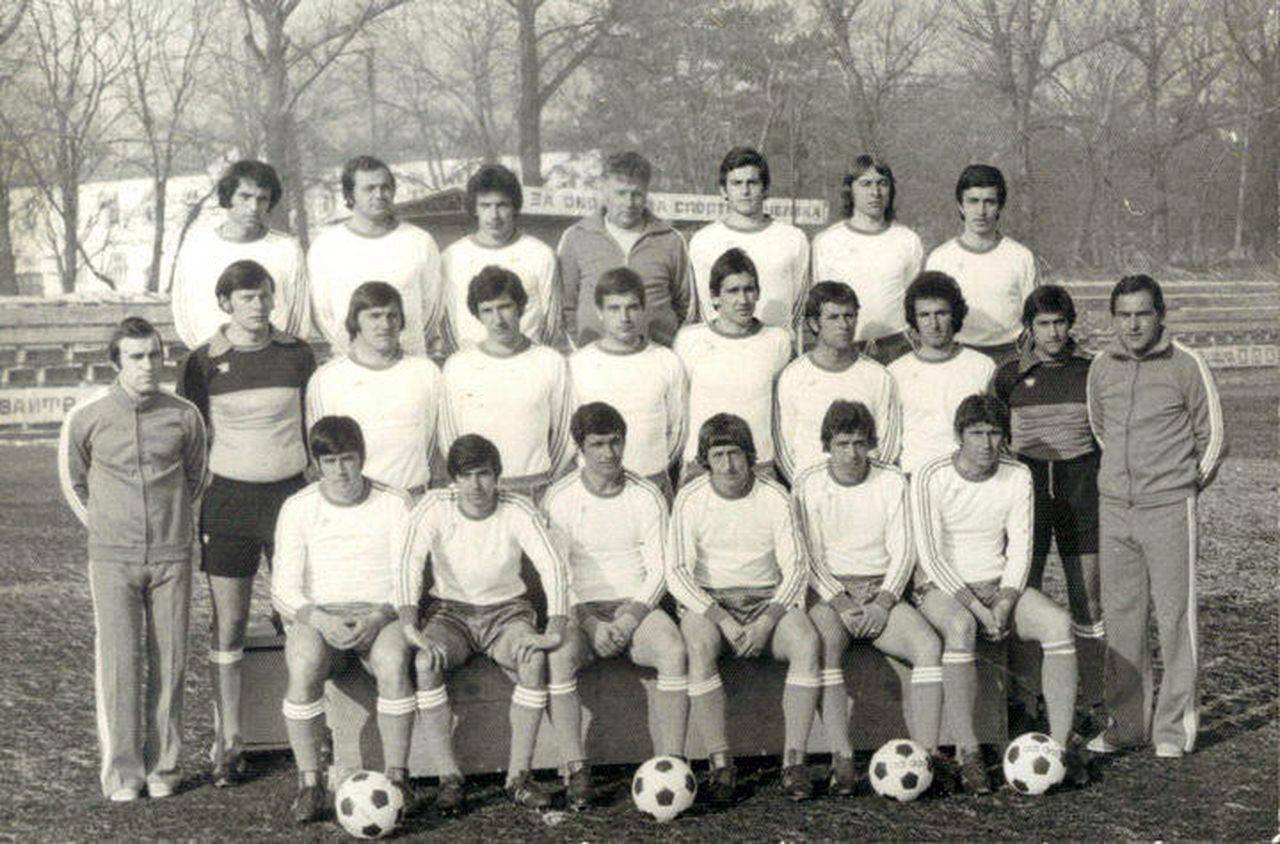
Slivnishki Geroy in 1975

The club was founded in 1923 and was named after Alexander of Battenberg, the knyaz who led Bulgaria to victory in the Battle of Slivnitsa, earning the name "the hero of Slivnitsa".

Slivnishki geroy has 13 seasons in the B PFG, the second level of Bulgarian football, including continuously from 1970 to 1983. The club's highest achievement to date is finishing at 4th place in the second division in 1975.

During the 1982–83 season, Slivnishki Geroi won just eleven games in the B PFG campaign and was relegated to the amateur V AFG, the third tier of the Bulgarian football pyramid. A year later, the club was relegated to the fourth division.

In 2001, Slivnishki Geroi secured promotion to the third division. In 2004, Radoslav Zdravkov was appointed manager on a two-year contract.

Slivnishki Geroi finished the 2010–11 South-West V AFG as champions and returned to the B PFG during 2011–12 for the first time in 28 years.

== Stadiums ==
Between 1924 and 1966, Slivnishki Geroi played at two grounds in the town, on the military division in Slivnitsa and on the Machine-tractor stations, but in 1966, the club moved to Slivnishki Geroi Stadium and have played there ever since. The stadium has a current capacity of 7,000.

== Current squad ==
As of 15 september 2026

No.	Pos.	Nation	Player
Goalkeepers
1	(Bulgaria) GK	Bulgaria	Aleksandar Slavov
12	(Bulgaria) GK	Bulgaria	Valentin Peev
69	(Bulgaria) GK	Bulgaria	Boyan Dishkov
Defenders
3	(Bulgaria) DF	Bulgaria	Kristiyan Borisov
5	(Bulgaria) DF	Bulgaria	Giulio Charlov
6	(Bulgaria) DF	Bulgaria	Sibil Karagyozov
14	(Bulgaria) DF	Bulgaria	Tsvetomir Todorov
15	(Bulgaria) DF	Bulgaria	Maksim Mechikyan
20	(Bulgaria) DF	Bulgaria	Borislav Milanov
24	(Bulgaria) DF	Bulgaria	Daniel Gusev
25	(Bulgaria) DF	Bulgaria	Nikola Nikolov
26	(Bulgaria) DF	Bulgaria	Kris Zlatinov
Midfielders
7	(Bulgaria) MF	Bulgaria	Georgi Iliev
8	(Bulgaria) MF	Bulgaria	Hristo Radkov
10	(Bulgaria) MF	Bulgaria	Stefan Alichkov
18	(Bulgaria) MF	Bulgaria	Lazar Georgiev
19	(Bulgaria) MF	Bulgaria	Lyuboslav Vasilev
23	(Bulgaria) MF	Bulgaria	Martin Kolev
Forwards
9	(Bulgaria) FW	Bulgaria	Martin Toshev
11	(Bulgaria) FW	Bulgaria	Yordan Todorov (captain)
17	(Bulgaria) FW	Bulgaria	Erik Manolkov
21	(Bulgaria) FW	Bulgaria	Radoslav Iliev
22	(Bulgaria) FW	Bulgaria	Hristiyan Dimitrov
99	(Bulgaria) FW	Bulgaria	Vanyo Nikolov
