= Stefan Staykov =

Bulgarian footballer (born 1949)

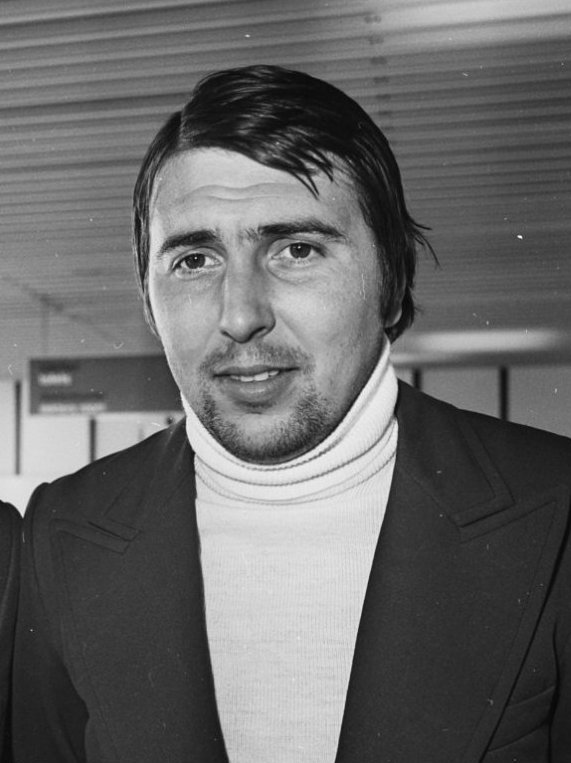
- Stefan Staykov in 1977

Personal information
- Full name: Stefan Georgiev Staykov
- Date of birth: 3 October 1949 (age 77)
- Place of birth: Sofia, Bulgaria
- Position: Goalkeeper

Senior career*
Years	Team	Apps	(Gls)
1968–1972	Spartak Varna	74	(0)
1972–1981	Levski Sofia	183	(0)
1981–1982	Osam Lovech		
1982–1984	Lokomotiv Plovdiv	66	(0)
1984–1985	Omonia Aradippou		

International career
	Bulgaria	19	(0)
- * Club domestic league appearances and goals

Stefan Georgiev Staykov (Bulgarian: Стефан Гeopгиeв Стайков; born 3 October 1949) is a former Bulgarian football goalkeeper who played for Bulgaria in the 1974 FIFA World Cup. He is a former soccer player / goalkeeper / of Spartak (Varna), Levski (Sofia), Osam (Lovech), Lokomotiv (Plovdiv), and Omonia Aradippou (Cyprus). He is a 3 times champion of Bulgaria and 3 times winner of the Bulgarian national cup. He is a former international participant in the Soccer World Cup in 1974, and former assistant - coach of Levski Sofia.

== Honours ==
Levski Sofia

- Bulgarian A PFG – 1974, 1977, 1979
- Bulgarian Cup – 1976, 1977, 1979
