= Kiril Milanov =

Bulgarian footballer

Personal information
- Date of birth: 17 September 1948
- Place of birth: Dupnitsa, Bulgaria
- Date of death: 25 January 2011 (aged 62)
- Position: Forward

Senior career*
Years	Team	Apps	(Gls)
1966–1972	Marek Dupnitsa	138	(31)
1972–1973	Akademik Sofia	32	(16)
1973–1978	Levski Sofia	84	(34)
Total		254	(81)

International career
- Bulgaria
- * Club domestic league appearances and goals

Kiril Milanov (Bulgarian: Кирил Миланов; 17 September 1948 – 25 January 2011) was a Bulgarian football player who played as a forward.

He played in Marek Dupnitsa, Akademik Sofia and Levski Sofia. He also played for Bulgaria national football team, earning 21 caps and scored 4 goals. Kiril Milanov holds the record for most goals in European club football for a single game with 6 and a tie with 10. He set these records against Finnish Cup Winners Reipas Lahti in 1976–77 CWC season scoring 6 in Sofia and 4 in the away game.

== Honours ==
PFC Levski Sofia

- Bulgarian Cup: 1976, 1977
- Champion of Bulgaria: 1974, 1977

Bulgaria

- 1974 FIFA World Cup – 12th place with Bulgaria
- 1973–76 Balkan Cup – 1st place with Bulgaria

Individual

- UEFA Cup Winners' Cup top scorer: 1976–77 (13 goals)

Records

- European Record for most individual goals in a game in all UEFA competitions – 6 goals
- European Record for most individual goals in a tie in all UEFA competitions – 10 goals
- UEFA Cup Winners' Cup All-time top scorers Ratio ranking – 1st place
- Most goals in a single season in UEFA Cup Winners' Cup All-time ranking – 2nd place
- UEFA Cup Winners' Cup All-time top scorers – 7th place (14 goals)
