= Georgi Tsvetkov =

Bulgarian footballer

Personal information
- Full name: Georgi Tsvetkov Ivanov
- Date of birth: 10 September 1947 (age 79)
- Place of birth: Sofia, Bulgaria
- Position: Forward

Senior career*
Years	Team	Apps	(Gls)
1964–1968	Spartak Sofia	101	(25)
1969–1970	Akademik Sofia	31	(8)
1970–1977	Levski Sofia	154	(56)
1977–1979	Spartak Varna	42	(8)
Total		328	(97)

International career
1967–1972	Bulgaria	10	(1)

Managerial career
- 1996: Levski Sofia
- 1998–1999: Vihren Sandanski
Medal record
Representing Bulgaria
Men's football
Silver medal – second place	1968 Mexico	Team
- * Club domestic league appearances and goals

Georgi Tsvetkov (Bulgarian: Георги Цветков; born 10 September 1947) is a former Bulgarian footballer who played as a forward. He competed at the 1968 Summer Olympics in Mexico City, where he won a silver medal with the Bulgarian team.

== Honours ==
=== Club ===
Levski Sofia

- A Group (2): 1973–74, 1976–77
- Bulgarian Cup (3): 1971, 1976, 1977
