= Stefan Pavlov =

Bulgarian footballer

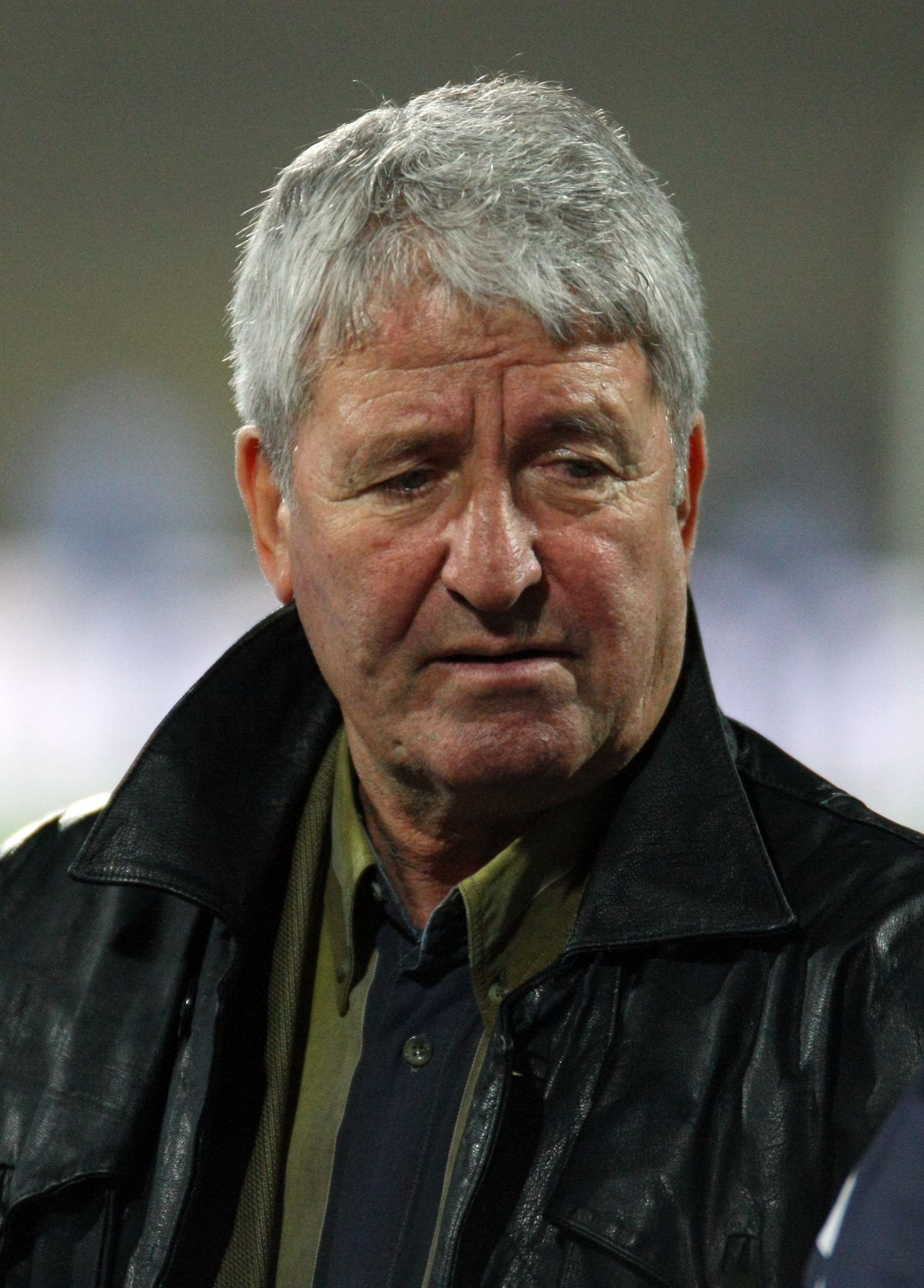
- Stefan Pavlov

Personal information
- Full name: Stefan Pavlov Dimitrov
- Date of birth: 26 May 1945 (age 81)
- Place of birth: Godech, Bulgaria
- Position: Midfielder

Youth career
- Septemvri Sofia

Senior career*
Years	Team	Apps	(Gls)
1965–1967	Chepinets Velingrad		
1967–1969	Levski Sofia	38	(4)
1970	Akademik Sofia	13	(2)
1970–1972	Levski Sofia	54	(4)
1972–1973	Slavia Sofia	29	(2)
1973–1978	Levski Sofia	139	(7)
- * Club domestic league appearances and goals

Stefan Pavlov (Bulgarian: Стефан Павлов; born 26 May 1945 in Godech) is a former Bulgarian footballer who played as а midfielder.

== Honours ==
Levski Sofia

- Bulgarian A PFG – 1968, 1970, 1974, 1977
- Bulgarian Cup – 1970, 1971, 1976, 1977
