= Voyn Voynov =

Bulgarian footballer

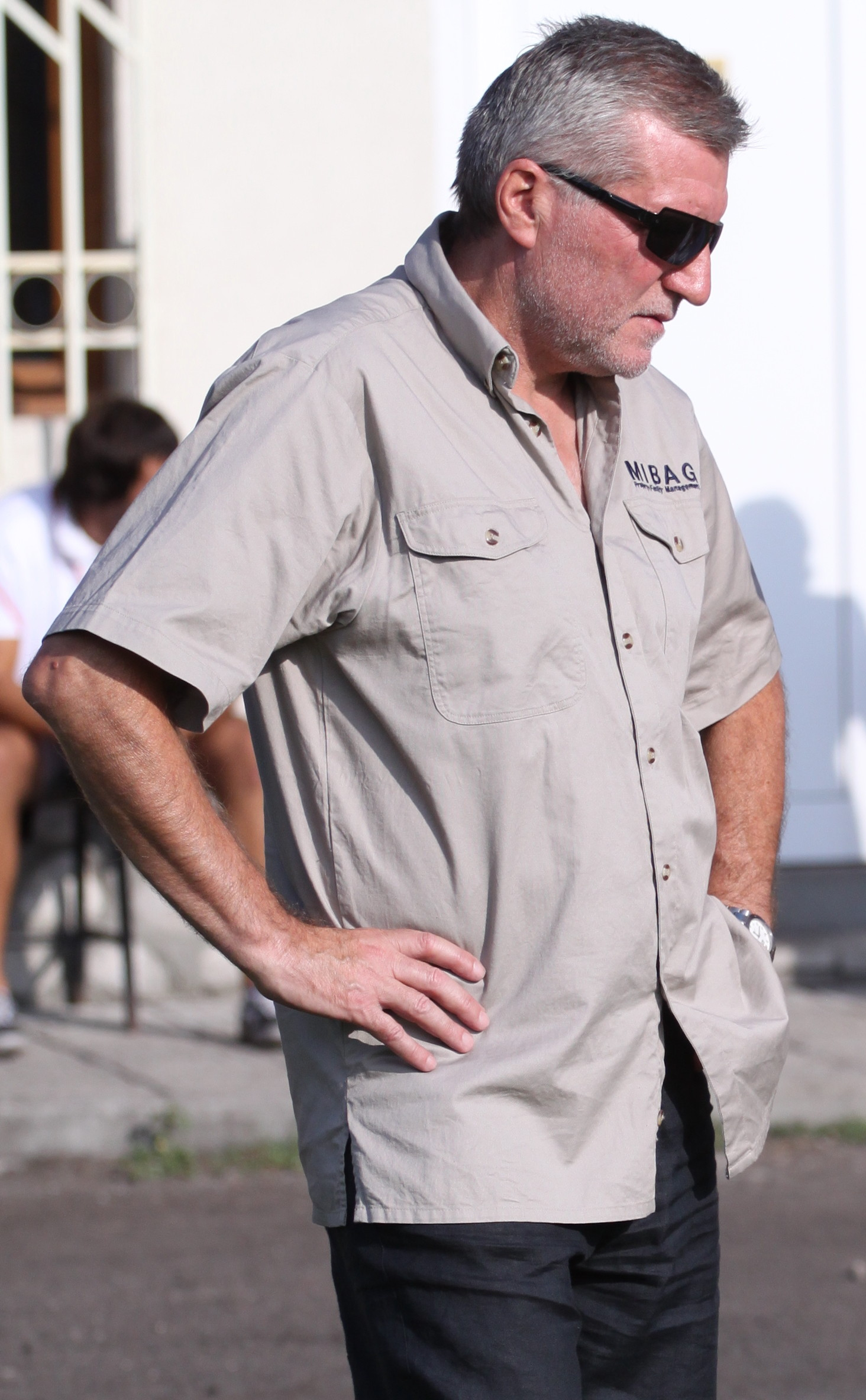

Personal information
- Full name: Voyn Yordanov Voynov
- Date of birth: 7 September 1952 (age 74)
- Place of birth: Chepintsi, Bulgaria
- Position: Winger

Youth career
- 1962–1971: Levski Sofia

Senior career*
| Years | Team | Apps | (Gls) |
| 1972–1981 | Levski Sofia | 224 | (36) |
| Total | | 224 | (36) |

International career
| 1973–1979 | Bulgaria | 32 | (1) |

Managerial career
- 1994: Lokomotiv Plovdiv
- 1999–2001: Hebar Pazardzhik
- 2001–2002: Belasitsa Petrich
- 2002–2004: Rodopa Smolyan
- 2005–2006: Slivnishki Geroy
- 2006: Minyor Pernik
- 2006: Hebar Pazardzhik
- 2006–2007: Rodopa Smolyan
- 2008–2009: Akademik Sofia
- 2009–2010: Lokomotiv Mezdra
- 2010–2012: Bansko
- 2012–2013: Slavia Sofia (assistant)
- 2014: Lyubimets
- 2016–2017: Rilski Sportist
- 2017: Lokomotiv Plovdiv
- 2018: Rilski Sportist
- 2018–2019: Oborishte
- * Club domestic league appearances and goals

Voyn Yordanov Voynov (Bulgarian: Войн Йорданов Войнов; born 7 September 1952) is a former Bulgarian footballer who played as a winger.

Voynov started playing in 1972 and spent the whole of his career as a player in Levski Sofia until 1981. He played 226 games and scored 36 goals in A PFG all for Levski. He played a quarter final for the UEFA Cup in 1976 and for the Cup Winners' Cup in 1977. He appeared for the Bulgaria national team in 32 matches and took part in World Cup tournament in 1974 with it. Voinov was known as a fast and technical player.

He coached FC Iskar, Hebar Pazardzhik, Belasitsa Petrich, Rodopa Smolyan, Slivnishki geroi, Minyor Pernik, Akademik Sofia, Lokomotiv Mezdra, Bansko, Lyubimets, Rilski Sportist and currently Lokomotiv Plovdiv.

== Awards ==
- Bulgarian champion with Levski: 1973–1974, 1976–1977, 1978–1979
- Bulgarian Cup winner with Levski: 1975–1976, 1976–1977, 1978–1979
- 1973–76 Balkan Cup winner with Bulgaria

== See also ==
- List of one-club men in association football
