= Stefan Aladzhov =

Bulgarian footballer

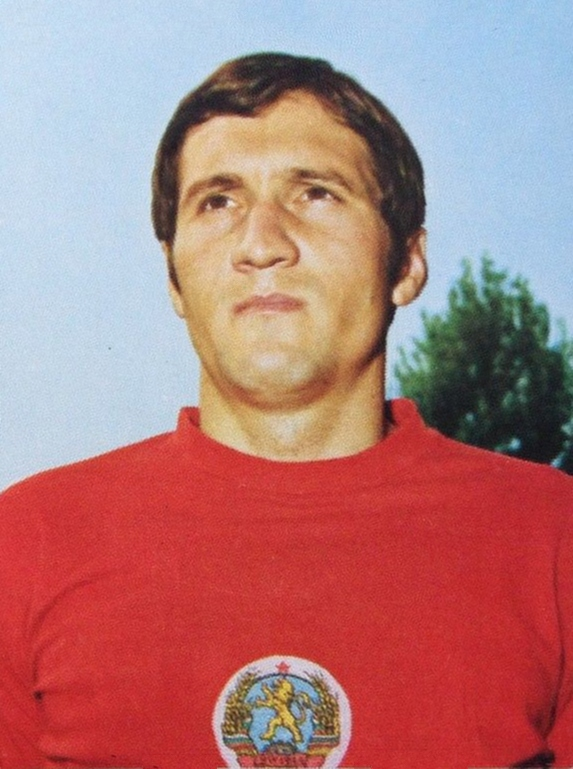
- Aladzhov at the age of 26 in 1974

Personal information
- Full name: Stefan Atanasov Aladzhov
- Date of birth: 18 October 1947 (age 79)
- Place of birth: Sofia, Bulgaria
- Position: Left-back

Senior career*
Years	Team	Apps	(Gls)
1964–1966	Spartak Sofia	10	(0)
1966–1967	DNA Sliven		
1967–1981	Levski Sofia	368	(4)
1981–1982	Spartak Varna	33	(0)

International career
1969–1979	Bulgaria	30	(1)

Managerial career
- 1987–1989: Levski Sofia (assistant)
- 1989–1990: Osam Lovech
- 1990–1991: Levski Sofia (assistant)
- * Club domestic league appearances and goals

Stefan Atanasov Aladzhov (Bulgarian: Стефан Атанасов Аладжов, born 18 October 1947) is a former Bulgarian football defender. In his career, he played mostly for Levski Sofia.

In 1970 Aladzhov was named Bulgarian Footballer of the Year. For the Bulgaria national football team he played in two editions of the FIFA World Cup, in 1970 and in 1974.

== Awards ==
Levski Sofia

- Bulgarian champion: 1968, 1970, 1974, 1977, 1979
- Bulgarian cup winner: 1970, 1971, 1976, 1977, 1979
- Bulgarian Footballer of the Year: 1970
