= Pavel Panov =

Bulgarian footballer (1950–2018)

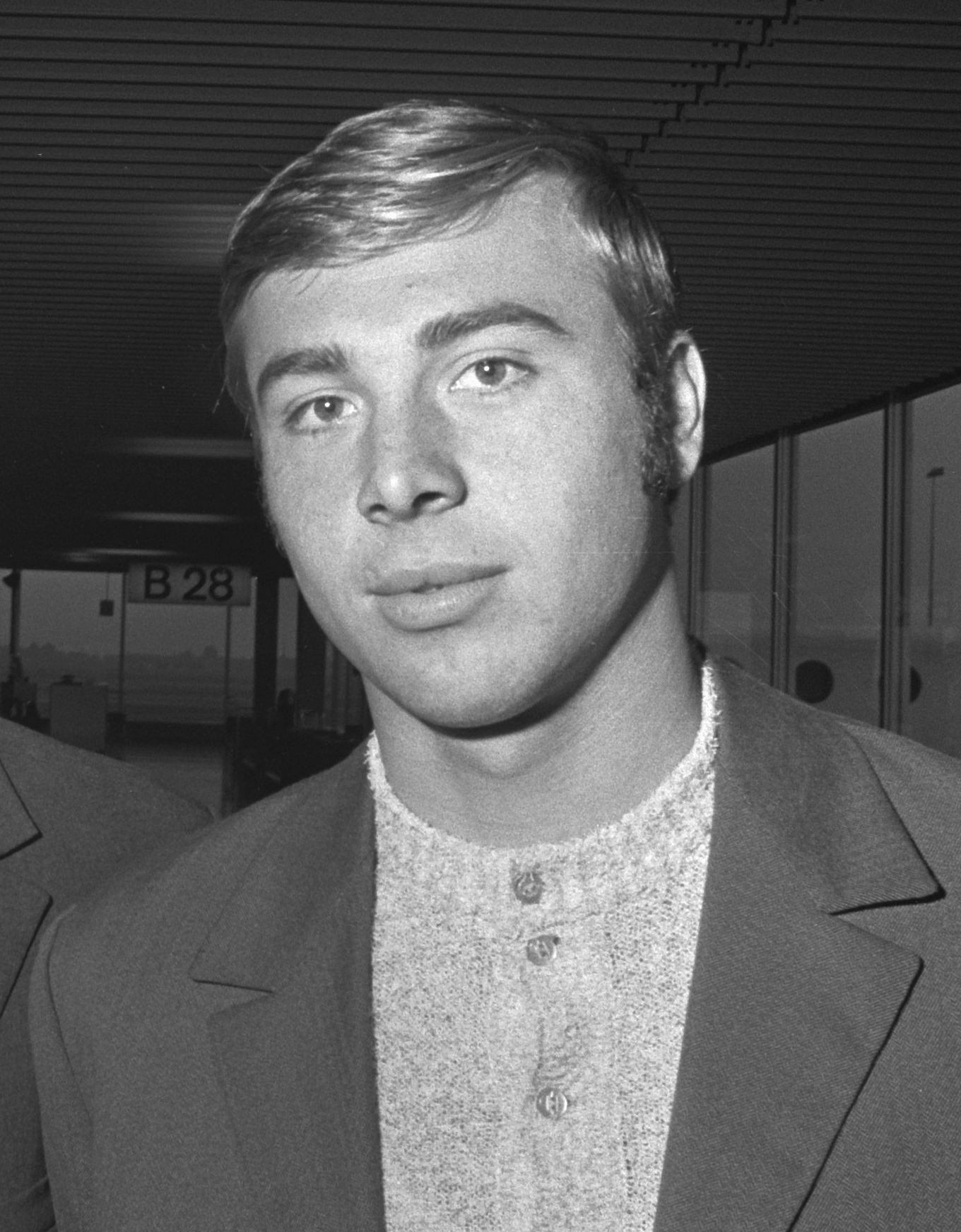
- Panov in 1971

Personal information
- Full name: Pavel Georgiev Panov
- Date of birth: 16 September 1950
- Place of birth: Sofia, PR Bulgaria
- Date of death: 18 February 2018 (aged 67)
- Place of death: Sofia, Bulgaria
- Position: Striker

Senior career*
| Years | Team | Apps | (Gls) |
| 1963–1968 | Septemvri Sofia | | |
| 1968 | Spartak Sofia | 8 | (5) |
| 1969–1981 | Levski Sofia | 301 | (131) |
| 1981–1982 | Aris | 25 | (0) |

International career
| 1967–1969 | Bulgaria U19 | 28 | (20) |
| 1970–1972 | Bulgaria U23 | 26 | (8) |
| 1971–1979 | Bulgaria | 44 | (13) |

Managerial career
- 1986–1987: Levski Sofia
- 1988–1989: Haskovo
- 1989–1990: Levski Sofia
- 1990–1991: Iwuanyanwu Nationale
- 1992–1993: Septemvri Sofia
- 1992–1993: Bulgaria U21
- 1993–1995: Botev Plovdiv
- 1995–1999: Septemvri Sofia
- 2000: Lokomotiv Sofia
- 2006: Rodopa Smolyan
- * Club domestic league appearances and goals

Pavel Georgiev Panov (Bulgarian: Павел Гeopгиeв Панов; 16 September 1950 – 18 February 2018) was a Bulgarian football player and coach, who played as a midfielder or striker.

== Career ==
Panov started his career with Septemvri Sofia in 1963 and stayed there until 1968.

In 1969, he moved to Spartak Sofia. After the forceful union of Levski Sofia with Spartak in the late 1969 he became one of the best players in blue. In Levski he stayed twelve seasons, playing in 301 games and scoring 130 goals in the Championship. He played in forty-four games and scored thirteen goals for the Bulgaria National team with which he played in the World Cup tournament in 1974.

With 22 goals Panov is the Third highest all-time Bulgarian goalscorer in European club competitions, after Hristo Stoichkov and Dimitar Berbatov. Quarterfinalist for the Cup Winners' Cup in 1970 and 1977 and also for the UEFA Cup in 1976. One of the biggest Bulgarian players of the 1970s. Master of the free kicks. He also played for Aris FC before finishing his career in Haskovo. He coached Levski in 1986–1987 and again in 1989–1990. He also coached Iwuanyanwu Nationale, Bulgaria's national youth side, Botev Plovdiv, Septemvri, Lokomotiv Sofia. He was president of Levski's Sport-technical board.

== Awards ==
Levski Sofia

- Bulgarian champion: 1969–1970, 1973–1974, 1976–1977, 1978–1979
- Bulgarian Cup winner: 1969–1970, 1970–1971, 1975–1976, 1976–1977, 1978–1979

Individual

- Best goal scorer in Bulgaria in 1976 (18 goals) and 1977 (20 goals)
- Bulgarian Footballer of the Year in 1977

International

- UEFA Euro Under-19 Champion with Bulgaria: 1969
- Balkan Cup Champion with Bulgaria: 1976

Coach

- Cup of the Soviet Army winner with Levski: 1987
