= UEFA Euro 1984 qualifying =

European football competition

Tournament details
- Dates: 1 May 1982 – 22 December 1983
- Teams: 32

Tournament statistics
- Matches played: 116
- Goals scored: 341 (2.94 per match)
- Top scorer: (West Germany) Karl-Heinz Rummenigge (7 goals)

The qualifying round for the 1984 European Football Championship consisted of 32 teams divided into seven groups; three of four teams and four of five teams. The qualifying round was played at various times between May 1982 and December 1983, with some groups concluding earlier than others.

== Qualified teams ==
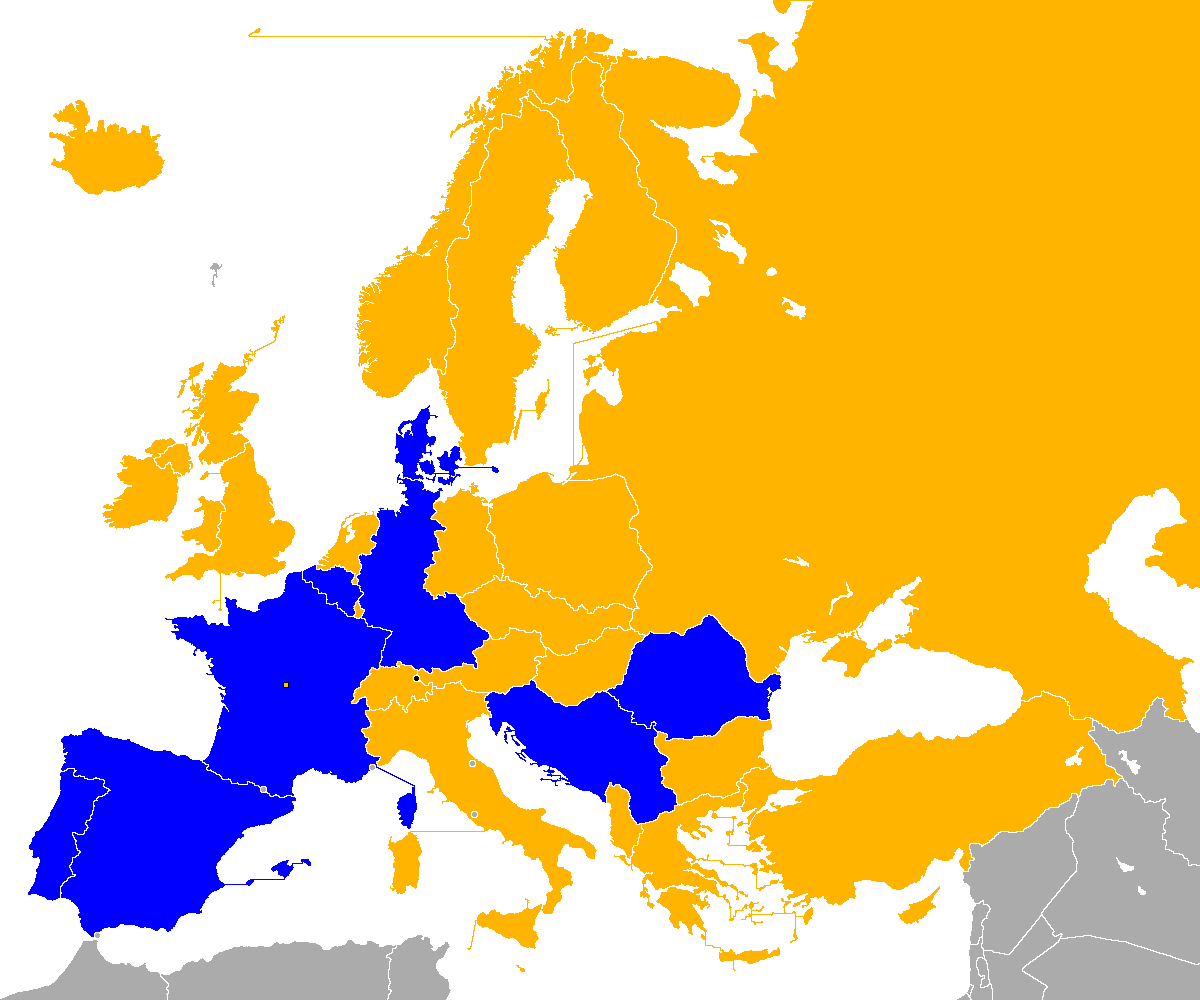
Qualified Did not qualify Did not enter Not a UEFA member

| Team | Qualified as | Qualified on | Previous appearances in tournament (Note: Bold indicates champion for that year. Italic indicates host for that year.) |
|---|---|---|---|
| France | Host | 10 December 1981 | 1 (1960) |
| Belgium | Group 1 winner | 12 October 1983 | 2 (1972, 1980) |
| Portugal | Group 2 winner | 1 November 1983 | 0 (debut) |
| Denmark | Group 3 winner | 16 November 1983 | 1 (1964) |
| West Germany | Group 6 winner | 20 November 1983 | 3 (**1972**, 1976, **1980**) |
| Romania | Group 5 winner | 30 November 1983 | 0 (debut) |
| Yugoslavia | Group 4 winner | 21 December 1983 | 3 (1960, 1968, 1976) |
| Spain | Group 7 winner | 21 December 1983 | 2 (**1964**, 1980) |

== Seedings ==
The draw took place on 8 January 1982 in Paris, France. 32 teams were drawn from the five pots into the seven groups. France qualified automatically as hosts.

| Pot 1 | Pot 2 | Pot 3 | Pot 4 | Pot 5 |
|---|---|---|---|---|
| **West Germany** (title holder); **Spain**; Italy; Poland; **Yugoslavia**; England; **Belgium** | Czechoslovakia; Austria; Netherlands; Soviet Union; East Germany; Hungary; Wales | Scotland; Northern Ireland; Republic of Ireland; **Romania**; Greece; **Portugal**; Bulgaria | Sweden; **Denmark**; Switzerland; Finland; Turkey; Norway; Iceland | Albania; Malta; Cyprus; Luxembourg |

== Overview ==
There were a number of extremely close finishes in some of the qualifying groups. In Group 2, Portugal edged out the Soviet Union by beating them narrowly 1–0 on a penalty by Rui Jordão in Lisbon on the final day. Meanwhile, in Group 5, again on the final day, Romania managed to hold on for a tense 1–1 draw in Bratislava and qualify at the expense of Czechoslovakia. A major surprise in this group was the poor performance of then-World Cup holders Italy, who were rebuilding after the retirement of many of their 1982 World Cup heroes and quickly dropped out of contention.

Another surprise was the qualification of Denmark in Group 3 at the expense of England. Having conceded a 2–2 draw at home against England, the hitherto unknown Danes performed well in their other qualifiers and capped their impressive campaign with a 1–0 win at Wembley, while England dropped a point at home against Greece that ultimately cost them the qualifying berth.

There was also heartbreak for Northern Ireland in Group 6. After managing to beat hot favourites West Germany both home and away earlier in the campaign, they came within 11 minutes of making it to France, but could only look on as Gerd Strack scored a crucial late winning goal for the West Germans in their own final fixture at home to Albania.

In Group 7, the Netherlands thought they had done enough to qualify, given that their closest rivals Spain went into the final match needing to beat Malta by eleven goals in order to qualify. And when Spain went in at half-time in Seville leading the Maltese minnows by a margin of only 3–1, the Dutch could have been forgiven for assuming they were home and dry. Spain, incredibly, then proceeded to score nine more goals in the second half, the last of them coming in the 83rd minute from Juan Señor, to book an unlikely passage to the finals. UEFA has since changed its rules: all teams now play their final game at exactly the same time and date, so that none of the teams has an advantage. Also, overall goal difference is now de-emphasised in the tie-breakers in favour of head-to-head results.

Things were tightest of all in Group 4, where Wales, Bulgaria and Yugoslavia were all in contention until the final few seconds of the last match in the group, between the latter two teams in Split. A draw would have put the onlooking Welsh through to the finals, but just moments after Bulgaria had squandered a glorious chance to score the winning goal and seal their own qualification, Yugoslavian defender Ljubomir Radanović wrote himself into Balkan footballing history with the 90th-minute header that sent him and his teammates to France.

== Tiebreakers ==
If two or more teams finished level on points after completion of the group matches, the following tie-breakers were used to determine the final ranking:

1. Greater number of points in all group matches
2. Goal difference in all group matches
3. Greater number of goals scored in all group matches
4. Drawing of lots

== Summary ==
Group winners qualified directly for UEFA Euro 1984
Other teams were eliminated

| Group 1 | Group 2 | Group 3 | Group 4 | Group 5 | Group 6 | Group 7 |
|---|---|---|---|---|---|---|
| Belgium | Portugal | Denmark | Yugoslavia | Romania | West Germany | Spain |
| Switzerland East Germany Scotland | Soviet Union Poland Finland | England Greece Hungary Luxembourg | Wales Bulgaria Norway | Sweden Czechoslovakia Italy Cyprus | Northern Ireland Austria Turkey Albania | Netherlands Republic of Ireland Iceland Malta |

== Groups ==
Four groups of five teams and three groups of four teams competed for qualification for UEFA Euro 1984. The teams played home and away matches against the other teams nations in their group. The seven teams that acquired the most points to win their respective group qualified for the main tournament, joining the host nation France.

=== Group 1 ===
| Pos | Team | Pld | W | D | L | GF | GA | GD | Pts | Qualification | (Belgium) | (Switzerland) | (East Germany) | (Scotland) |
|---|---|---|---|---|---|---|---|---|---|---|---|---|---|---|
| 1 | Belgium | 6 | 4 | 1 | 1 | 12 | 8 | +4 | **9** | Qualify for final tournament | — | 3–0 | 2–1 | 3–2 |
| 2 | Switzerland | 6 | 2 | 2 | 2 | 7 | 9 | −2 | **6** | | 3–1 | — | 0–0 | 2–0 |
| 3 | East Germany | 6 | 2 | 1 | 3 | 7 | 7 | 0 | **5** | | 1–2 | 3–0 | — | 2–1 |
| 4 | Scotland | 6 | 1 | 2 | 3 | 8 | 10 | −2 | **4** | | 1–1 | 2–2 | 2–0 | — |

Source: UEFA

=== Group 2 ===
| Pos | Team | Pld | W | D | L | GF | GA | GD | Pts | Qualification | (Portugal) | (Soviet Union) | (Poland) | (Finland) |
|---|---|---|---|---|---|---|---|---|---|---|---|---|---|---|
| 1 | Portugal | 6 | 5 | 0 | 1 | 11 | 6 | +5 | **10** | Qualify for final tournament | — | 1–0 | 2–1 | 5–0 |
| 2 | Soviet Union | 6 | 4 | 1 | 1 | 11 | 2 | +9 | **9** | | 5–0 | — | 2–0 | 2–0 |
| 3 | Poland | 6 | 1 | 2 | 3 | 6 | 9 | −3 | **4** | | 0–1 | 1–1 | — | 1–1 |
| 4 | Finland | 6 | 0 | 1 | 5 | 3 | 14 | −11 | **1** | | 0–2 | 0–1 | 2–3 | — |

Source: UEFA

=== Group 3 ===
| Pos | Team | Pld | W | D | L | GF | GA | GD | Pts | Qualification | (Denmark) | (England) | (Greece) | (Hungary) | (Luxembourg) |
|---|---|---|---|---|---|---|---|---|---|---|---|---|---|---|---|
| 1 | Denmark | 8 | 6 | 1 | 1 | 17 | 5 | +12 | **13** | Qualify for final tournament | — | 2–2 | 1–0 | 3–1 | 6–0 |
| 2 | England | 8 | 5 | 2 | 1 | 23 | 3 | +20 | **12** | | 0–1 | — | 0–0 | 2–0 | 9–0 |
| 3 | Greece | 8 | 3 | 2 | 3 | 8 | 10 | −2 | **8** | | 0–2 | 0–3 | — | 2–2 | 1–0 |
| 4 | Hungary | 8 | 3 | 1 | 4 | 18 | 17 | +1 | **7** | | 1–0 | 0–3 | 2–3 | — | 6–2 |
| 5 | Luxembourg | 8 | 0 | 0 | 8 | 5 | 36 | −31 | **0** | | 1–2 | 0–4 | 0–2 | 2–6 | — |

Source: UEFA

=== Group 4 ===
| Pos | Team | Pld | W | D | L | GF | GA | GD | Pts | Qualification | (Socialist Federal Republic of Yugoslavia) | (Wales) | (Bulgaria) | (Norway) |
|---|---|---|---|---|---|---|---|---|---|---|---|---|---|---|
| 1 | Yugoslavia | 6 | 3 | 2 | 1 | 12 | 11 | +1 | **8** | Qualify for final tournament | — | 4–4 | 3–2 | 2–1 |
| 2 | Wales | 6 | 2 | 3 | 1 | 7 | 6 | +1 | **7** | | 1–1 | — | 1–0 | 1–0 |
| 3 | Bulgaria | 6 | 2 | 1 | 3 | 7 | 8 | −1 | **5** | | 0–1 | 1–0 | — | 2–2 |
| 4 | Norway | 6 | 1 | 2 | 3 | 7 | 8 | −1 | **4** | | 3–1 | 0–0 | 1–2 | — |

Source: UEFA

=== Group 5 ===
| Pos | Team | Pld | W | D | L | GF | GA | GD | Pts | Qualification | (Romania) | (Sweden) | (Czechoslovakia) | (Italy) | (Cyprus) |
|---|---|---|---|---|---|---|---|---|---|---|---|---|---|---|---|
| 1 | Romania | 8 | 5 | 2 | 1 | 9 | 3 | +6 | **12** | Qualify for final tournament | — | 2–0 | 0–1 | 1–0 | 3–1 |
| 2 | Sweden | 8 | 5 | 1 | 2 | 14 | 5 | +9 | **11** | | 0–1 | — | 1–0 | 2–0 | 5–0 |
| 3 | Czechoslovakia | 8 | 3 | 4 | 1 | 15 | 7 | +8 | **10** | | 1–1 | 2–2 | — | 2–0 | 6–0 |
| 4 | Italy | 8 | 1 | 3 | 4 | 6 | 12 | −6 | **5** | | 0–0 | 0–3 | 2–2 | — | 3–1 |
| 5 | Cyprus | 8 | 0 | 2 | 6 | 4 | 21 | −17 | **2** | | 0–1 | 0–1 | 1–1 | 1–1 | — |

Source: UEFA

=== Group 6 ===
| Pos | Team | Pld | W | D | L | GF | GA | GD | Pts | Qualification | (West Germany) | (Northern Ireland) | (Austria) | (Turkey) | (Albania) |
|---|---|---|---|---|---|---|---|---|---|---|---|---|---|---|---|
| 1 | West Germany | 8 | 5 | 1 | 2 | 15 | 5 | +10 | **11** | Qualify for final tournament | — | 0–1 | 3–0 | 5–1 | 2–1 |
| 2 | Northern Ireland | 8 | 5 | 1 | 2 | 8 | 5 | +3 | **11** | | 1–0 | — | 3–1 | 2–1 | 1–0 |
| 3 | Austria | 8 | 4 | 1 | 3 | 15 | 10 | +5 | **9** | | 0–0 | 2–0 | — | 4–0 | 5–0 |
| 4 | Turkey | 8 | 3 | 1 | 4 | 8 | 16 | −8 | **7** | | 0–3 | 1–0 | 3–1 | — | 1–0 |
| 5 | Albania | 8 | 0 | 2 | 6 | 4 | 14 | −10 | **2** | | 1–2 | 0–0 | 1–2 | 1–1 | — |

Source: UEFA

=== Group 7 ===
| Pos | Team | Pld | W | D | L | GF | GA | GD | Pts | Qualification | (Spain) | (Netherlands) | (Republic of Ireland) | (Iceland) | (Malta) |
|---|---|---|---|---|---|---|---|---|---|---|---|---|---|---|---|
| 1 | Spain | 8 | 6 | 1 | 1 | 24 | 8 | +16 | **13** | Qualify for final tournament | — | 1–0 | 2–0 | 1–0 | 12–1 |
| 2 | Netherlands | 8 | 6 | 1 | 1 | 22 | 6 | +16 | **13** | | 2–1 | — | 2–1 | 3–0 | 5–0 |
| 3 | Republic of Ireland | 8 | 4 | 1 | 3 | 20 | 10 | +10 | **9** | | 3–3 | 2–3 | — | 2–0 | 8–0 |
| 4 | Iceland | 8 | 1 | 1 | 6 | 3 | 13 | −10 | **3** | | 0–1 | 1–1 | 0–3 | — | 1–0 |
| 5 | Malta | 8 | 1 | 0 | 7 | 5 | 37 | −32 | **2** | | 2–3 | 0–6 | 0–1 | 2–1 | — |

Source: UEFA

== Goalscorers ==
There were 342 goals scored in 116 matches, for an average of 2.95 goals per match.

7 goals

- (Germany national football team) Karl-Heinz Rummenigge

6 goals

- (Spain national football team) Santillana

5 goals

- (Austria national football team) Walter Schachner
- (Greece national football team) Nikos Anastopoulos
- (Hungary national football team) Tibor Nyilasi
- (Netherlands national football team) Ruud Gullit
- (Republic of Ireland national football team) Frank Stapleton
- (Spain national football team) Hipólito Rincón
- (Germany national football team) Rudi Völler

4 goals

- (Belgium national football team) Erwin Vandenbergh
- (Denmark national football team) Preben Elkjær
- (Denmark national football team) Allan Simonsen
- (East Germany national football team) Joachim Streich
- (Netherlands national football team) Dick Schoenaker
- (Spain national football team) Antonio Maceda
- (Sweden men's national football team) Dan Corneliusson

3 goals

- (Belgium national football team) François Van der Elst
- (Czechoslovakia national football team) Ladislav Vízek
- (Denmark national football team) Michael Laudrup
- (England national football team) Luther Blissett
- (England national football team) Trevor Francis
- (England national football team) Tony Woodcock
- (Hungary national football team) József Póczik
- (Netherlands national football team) Peter Houtman
- (Romania national football team) László Bölöni
- (Spain national football team) Juan Antonio Señor
- (Yugoslavia national football team) Safet Sušić

2 goals

- (Albania national football team) Muhedin Targaj
- (Austria national football team) Felix Gasselich
- (Austria national football team) Max Hagmayr
- (Belgium national football team) Ludo Coeck
- (Czechoslovakia national football team) Václav Daněk
- (Czechoslovakia national football team) Petr Janečka
- (Czechoslovakia national football team) Petr Rada
- (Denmark national football team) Jesper Olsen
- (England national football team) Glenn Hoddle
- (England national football team) Sammy Lee
- (England national football team) Paul Mariner
- (England national football team) Bryan Robson
- (Hungary national football team) Gyula Hajszán
- (Iceland national football team) Atli Eðvaldsson
- (Italy national football team) Alessandro Altobelli
- (Luxembourg national football team) Jeannot Reiter
- (Malta national football team) Carmel Busuttil
- (Netherlands national football team) Frank Rijkaard
- (Netherlands national football team) Cees van Kooten
- (Northern Ireland national football team) Martin O'Neill
- (Northern Ireland national football team) Ian Stewart
- (Northern Ireland national football team) Norman Whiteside
- (Norway national football team) Åge Hareide
- (Norway national football team) Arne Larsen Økland
- (Norway national football team) Hallvar Thoresen
- (Poland national football team) Włodzimierz Smolarek
- (Portugal national football team) Rui Jordão
- (Portugal national football team) Carlos Manuel
- (Portugal national football team) Nené
- (Portugal national football team) António Oliveira
- (Republic of Ireland national football team) Liam Brady
- (Republic of Ireland national football team) Gerry Daly
- (Republic of Ireland national football team) Mark Lawrenson
- (Republic of Ireland national football team) Kevin Sheedy
- (Republic of Ireland national football team) Gary Waddock
- (Romania national football team) Rodion Cămătaru
- (Scotland national football team) Kenny Dalglish
- (Scotland national football team) Charlie Nicholas
- (Scotland national football team) John Wark
- (Soviet Union national football team) Oleg Blokhin
- (Soviet Union national football team) Fyodor Cherenkov
- (Soviet Union national football team) Anatoliy Demyanenko
- (Sweden men's national football team) Ulf Eriksson
- (Sweden men's national football team) Robert Prytz
- (Sweden men's national football team) Glenn Strömberg
- (Switzerland national football team) André Egli
- (Turkey national football team) Hasan Şengün
- (Turkey national football team) Selçuk Yula
- (Wales national football team) Robbie James
- (Wales national football team) Ian Rush

1 goal

- (Albania national football team) Genc Tomorri
- (Austria national football team) Ernst Baumeister
- (Austria national football team) Karl Brauneder
- (Austria national football team) Bruno Pezzey
- (Austria national football team) Toni Polster
- (Austria national football team) Herbert Prohaska
- (Belgium national football team) Jan Ceulemans
- (Belgium national football team) Franky Vercauteren
- (Bulgaria national football team) Georgi Dimitrov
- (Bulgaria national football team) Rusi Gochev
- (Bulgaria national football team) Bozhidar Iskrenov
- (Bulgaria national football team) Stoycho Mladenov
- (Bulgaria national football team) Plamen Nikolov
- (Bulgaria national football team) Nasko Sirakov
- (Bulgaria national football team) Boycho Velichkov
- (Cyprus national football team) Takis Mavris
- (Cyprus national football team) Fanis Theofanous
- (Cyprus national football team) Marios Tsingis
- (Cyprus national football team) Fivos Vrahimis
- (Czechoslovakia national football team) Přemysl Bičovský
- (Czechoslovakia national football team) Pavel Chaloupka
- (Czechoslovakia national football team) Ladislav Jurkemik
- (Czechoslovakia national football team) Milan Luhový
- (Czechoslovakia national football team) Zdeněk Prokeš
- (Czechoslovakia national football team) Jiří Sloup
- (Denmark national football team) Klaus Berggreen
- (Denmark national football team) Søren Busk
- (Denmark national football team) Allan Hansen
- (Denmark national football team) Søren Lerby
- (East Germany national football team) Rainer Ernst
- (East Germany national football team) Ronald Kreer
- (East Germany national football team) Hans Richter
- (England national football team) Terry Butcher
- (England national football team) Mark Chamberlain
- (England national football team) Steve Coppell
- (England national football team) Phil Neal
- (England national football team) Peter Withe
- (Finland national football team) Keijo Kousa
- (Finland national football team) Ari Valvee
- (Greece national football team) Georgios Kostikos
- (Greece national football team) Lakis Papaioannou
- (Greece national football team) Dimitris Saravakos
- (Hungary national football team) Béla Bodonyi
- (Hungary national football team) Győző Burcsa
- (Hungary national football team) Péter Hannich
- (Hungary national football team) József Kardos
- (Hungary national football team) László Kiss
- (Hungary national football team) Sándor Kiss
- (Hungary national football team) Gábor Pölöskei
- (Hungary national football team) Lázár Szentes
- (Iceland national football team) Marteinn Geirsson
- (Italy national football team) Antonio Cabrini
- (Italy national football team) Francesco Graziani
- (Italy national football team) Paolo Rossi
- (Luxembourg national football team) Marcel Di Domenico
- (Luxembourg national football team) Théo Malget
- (Luxembourg national football team) Romain Schreiner
- (Malta national football team) Silvio Demanuele
- (Malta national football team) Emanuel Fabri
- (Malta national football team) Ernest Spiteri-Gonzi
- (Netherlands national football team) Bud Brocken
- (Netherlands national football team) Hugo Hovenkamp
- (Netherlands national football team) Ronald Koeman
- (Netherlands national football team) Edo Ophof
- (Netherlands national football team) Marco van Basten
- (Netherlands national football team) Ben Wijnstekers
- (Northern Ireland national football team) Billy Hamilton
- (Northern Ireland national football team) John McClelland
- (Norway national football team) Tom Lund
- (Poland national football team) Zbigniew Boniek
- (Poland national football team) Dariusz Dziekanowski
- (Poland national football team) Paweł Król
- (Poland national football team) Janusz Kupcewicz
- (Portugal national football team) Fernando Gomes
- (Portugal national football team) José Luís
- (Republic of Ireland national football team) Tony Grealish
- (Republic of Ireland national football team) Ashley Grimes
- (Republic of Ireland national football team) Kevin O'Callaghan
- (Republic of Ireland national football team) Michael Robinson
- (Republic of Ireland national football team) Mickey Walsh
- (Romania national football team) Ioan Andone
- (Romania national football team) Ion Geolgău
- (Romania national football team) Michael Klein
- (Romania national football team) Florea Văetuș
- (Scotland national football team) Eamonn Bannon
- (Scotland national football team) Paul Sturrock
- (Soviet Union national football team) Sergey Andreyev
- (Soviet Union national football team) Sergei Baltacha
- (Soviet Union national football team) Nikolay Larionov
- (Soviet Union national football team) Sergey Rodionov
- (Spain national football team) Lobo Carrasco
- (Spain national football team) Rafael Gordillo
- (Spain national football team) Víctor Muñoz
- (Spain national football team) Juan Carlos Pedraza
- (Spain national football team) Manuel Sarabia
- (Sweden men's national football team) Glenn Hysén
- (Sweden men's national football team) Mats Jingblad
- (Sweden men's national football team) Andreas Ravelli
- (Sweden men's national football team) Håkan Sandberg
- (Sweden men's national football team) Thomas Sunesson
- (Switzerland national football team) Jean-Paul Brigger
- (Switzerland national football team) Alain Geiger
- (Switzerland national football team) Heinz Hermann
- (Switzerland national football team) Marco Schällibaum
- (Switzerland national football team) Claudio Sulser
- (Turkey national football team) Arif Kocabıyık
- (Turkey national football team) Metin Tekin
- (Turkey national football team) Fatih Terim
- (Turkey national football team) İlyas Tüfekçi
- (Wales national football team) Jeremy Charles
- (Wales national football team) Brian Flynn
- (Wales national football team) Joey Jones
- (Germany national football team) Wolfgang Dremmler
- (Germany national football team) Uli Stielike
- (Germany national football team) Gerhard Strack
- (Yugoslavia national football team) Mehmed Baždarević
- (Yugoslavia national football team) Zvjezdan Cvetković
- (Yugoslavia national football team) Miodrag Ješić
- (Yugoslavia national football team) Zlatko Kranjčar
- (Yugoslavia national football team) Ljubomir Radanović
- (Yugoslavia national football team) Dušan Savić
- (Yugoslavia national football team) Nenad Stojković
- (Yugoslavia national football team) Zlatko Vujović
- (Yugoslavia national football team) Zvonko Živković

1 own goal

- (Albania national football team) Agustin Kola (against Austria)
- (Czechoslovakia national football team) Ján Kapko (against Italy)
- (Finland national football team) Jukka Ikäläinen (against Portugal)
- (Luxembourg national football team) Marcel Bossi (against England)
- (Poland national football team) Paweł Janas (against Finland)
- (Poland national football team) Roman Wójcicki (against Soviet Union)
- (Republic of Ireland national football team) Mick Martin (against Spain)
- (Switzerland national football team) Heinz Ludi (against Belgium)
- (Turkey national football team) Raşit Çetiner (against Albania)
