= Belgium national football team results (1980–1989) =

- Win Draw Loss

The 1980s were the most successful decade in the existence of Belgium's national football team, as they appeared in four of the five major tournaments (European and World Championships) and also reached their best positions so far: second place at Euro 1980 and fourth place at the 1986 World Cup. Apart from their appearances at end stages, they ensured qualification for the 1990 World Cup during the last years of the decade. Overall, the balance was positive with 39 wins versus 24 losses (and 21 draws).

== Results ==
84 matches played:

	Legend for encounters
S.O.	Summer Olympics
W.C.	FIFA World Cup
EURO	UEFA European Football Championship
CC	Confederations Cup
TB	Tie-break match
Q	Qualification rounds
R + number	Round number
FR	Final Round
GS	Group Stage
1/16	Round of 32
1/8	Round of 16
QF	Quarter-final
SF	Semi-final
F	Final
RP	Repechage
Rep.	Replay match
3rd-4th	Third place match

1980-02-27 Friendly	Belgium	5–0	Luxembourg	Brussels
	Vandenbergh 12', 21'; Vandereycken 16'; F. Van der Elst 66', 89'			Stadium: Heysel Stadium; Attendance: 1,226; Referee: Henk van Ettekoven (Netherlands)

1980-03-18 Friendly	Belgium	2–0	Uruguay	Brussels
	Verheyen 65' (pen.); F. Van der Elst 86'			Stadium: Heysel Stadium; Attendance: 3,974; Referee: Robert Wurtz (France)

1980-04-02 Friendly	Belgium	2–1	Poland	Brussels
	Coeck 38'; Vandenbergh 58'		Lato 65'	Stadium: Heysel Stadium; Attendance: 6,800; Referee: Heinz Aldinger (West Germany)

1980-06-06 Friendly	Belgium	2–1	Romania	Brussels
	Ceulemans 48'; F. Van der Elst 87'		Cămătaru 24'	Stadium: Heysel Stadium; Attendance: 3,875; Referee: Jacob Baumann (Switzerland)

1980-06-12 EURO 1980 GS	Belgium	1–1	England	Turin
	Ceulemans 30'	Report	Wilkins 26'	Stadium: Stadio Comunale; Attendance: 15,186; Referee: Heinz Aldinger (West Germany)

1980-06-15 EURO 1980 GS	Belgium	2–1	Spain	Milan
	Gerets 16'; Cools 65'	Report	Quini 36'	Stadium: San Siro; Attendance: 11,430; Referee: Charles Corver (Netherlands)

1980-06-18 EURO 1980 GS	Italy	0–0	Belgium	Rome
		Report		Stadium: Stadio Olimpico; Attendance: 42,318; Referee: António Garrido (Portugal)

1980-06-22 EURO 1980 F	Belgium	1–2	West Germany	Rome
	Vandereycken 71' (pen.)	Report	Hrubesch 10', 89'	Stadium: Stadio Olimpico; Attendance: 47,864; Referee: Nicolae Rainea (Romania)

1980-10-15 W.C. 1982 Q	Republic of Ireland	1–1	Belgium	Dublin
	Grealish 42'	Report	Cluytens 13'	Stadium: Lansdowne Road; Attendance: 40,000; Referee: Norbert Rolles (Luxembourg)

1980-11-19 W.C. 1982 Q	Belgium	1–0	Netherlands	Brussels
	Vandenbergh 48' (pen.)	Report		Stadium: Heysel Stadium; Attendance: 57,665; Referee: Eldar Azimzade (Soviet Union)

1980-12-21 W.C. 1982 Q	Cyprus	0–2	Belgium	Nicosia
		Report	Vandenbergh 30'; Ceulemans 69'	Stadium: Makario Stadium; Attendance: 6,000; Referee: Robert Valentine (Scotland)

1981-02-18 W.C. 1982 Q	Belgium	3–2	Cyprus	Brussels
	Plessers 12'; Vandenbergh 17'; Ceulemans 67'	Report	Lysandrou 41'; Vrahimis 52'	Stadium: Heysel Stadium; Attendance: 17,445; Referee: Arto Ravander (Finland)

1981-03-25 W.C. 1982 Q	Belgium	1–0	Republic of Ireland	Brussels
	Ceulemans 88'	Report		Stadium: Heysel Stadium; Attendance: 37,978; Referee: Raul Nazaré (Portugal)

1981-04-29 W.C. 1982 Q	France	3–2	Belgium	Paris
	Soler 14', 31'; Six 26'	Report	Vandenbergh 5'; Ceulemans 52'	Stadium: Parc des Princes; Attendance: 44,954; Referee: Victoriano Sánchez Arminio (Spain)

1981-09-09 W.C. 1982 Q	Belgium	2–0	France	Brussels
	Czerniatynski 24'; Vandenbergh 83'	Report		Stadium: Heysel Stadium; Attendance: 52,525; Referee: Palotai Károly (Hungary)

1981-10-14 W.C. 1982 Q	Netherlands	3–0	Belgium	Rotterdam
	Metgod 6'; Van Kooten 26'; Geels 54'	Report		Stadium: De Kuip; Attendance: 56,000; Referee: Brian McGinlay (Scotland)

1981-12-16 Friendly	Spain	2–0	Belgium	Valencia
	Satrústegui 7', 87'			Stadium: Estadio Luís Casanova; Attendance: 28,000; Referee: Volker Roth (West Germany)

1982-03-24 Friendly	Belgium	4–1	Romania	Brussels
	Verheyen 11', 45'; Czerniatynski 67', 75'		Ţicleanu 51'	Stadium: Heysel Stadium; Attendance: 7,330; Referee: Daniel Lambert (France)

1982-04-28 Friendly	Belgium	2–1	Bulgaria	Brussels
	Vandenbergh 3'; Van Moer 53'		Mladenov 26'	Stadium: Heysel Stadium; Attendance: 14,500; Referee: Gert Henning (West Germany)

1982-05-27 Friendly	Denmark	1–0	Belgium	Copenhagen
	Elkjær 62'			Stadium: Idrætsparken; Attendance: 12,000; Referee: Hans Harryason (Sweden)

1982-06-13 W.C. 1982 R1	Argentina	0–1	Belgium	Barcelona
		Report	Vandenbergh 63'	Stadium: Camp Nou; Attendance: 95,000; Referee: Vojtěch Christov (Czechoslovakia)

1982-06-19 W.C. 1982 R1	Belgium	1–0	El Salvador	Elche
	Coeck 19'	Report		Stadium: Nuevo Altabix; Attendance: 38,749; Referee: Malcolm Moffat (Northern Ireland)

1982-06-22 W.C. 1982 R1	Belgium	1–1	Hungary	Elche
	Czerniatynski 75'	Report	Varga 28'	Stadium: Nuevo Altabix; Attendance: 23,000; Referee: Clive White (England)

1982-06-28 W.C. 1982 R2	Poland	3–0	Belgium	Barcelona
	Boniek 3', 25', 54'	Report		Stadium: Camp Nou; Attendance: 65,000; Referee: Luís Siles (Costa Rica)

1982-07-01 W.C. 1982 R2	Belgium	0–1	Soviet Union	Barcelona
		Report	Oganesyan 48'	Stadium: Camp Nou; Attendance: 45,000; Referee: Michel Vautrot (France)

1982-09-22 Friendly	West Germany	0–0	Belgium	Munich
				Stadium: Olympiastadion; Attendance: 25,000; Referee: Vojtěch Christov (Czechoslovakia)

1982-10-06 EURO 1984 Q	Belgium	3–0	Switzerland	Brussels
	Lüdi 2' (o.g.); Coeck 47'; Vandenbergh 82'			Stadium: Heysel Stadium; Attendance: 16,808; Referee: Paolo Bergamo (Italy)

1982-12-15 EURO 1984 Q	Belgium	3–2	Scotland	Brussels
	Vandenbergh 26'; F. Van der Elst 38', 63'		Dalglish 13', 35'	Stadium: Heysel Stadium; Attendance: 48,877; Referee: António Garrido (Portugal)

1983-03-30 EURO 1984 Q	East Germany	1–2	Belgium	Leipzig
	Streich 83'		F. Van der Elst 36'; Vandenbergh 69'	Stadium: Zentralstadion; Attendance: 75,000; Referee: John Carpenter (Republic of Ireland)

1983-04-27 EURO 1984 Q	Belgium	2–1	East Germany	Brussels
	Ceulemans 19'; Coeck 37'		Streich 9'	Stadium: Heysel Stadium; Attendance: 43,894; Referee: Emilio Guruceta Muro (Spain)

1983-05-31 Friendly (Note: Friendly match at the occasion of the 75th Anniversary of the Luxembourg Football Federation; the other exhibition match in Luxembourg City, West Germany versus Yugoslavia, ended in 4–2)	Belgium	1–1	France	Luxembourg City
	Voordeckers 12'		Six 11'	Stadium: Stade Municipal; Attendance: 5,880; Referee: Norbert Rolles (Luxembourg)

1983-09-21 Friendly	Belgium	1–1	Netherlands	Brussels
	Voordeckers 74'		Van Basten 64'	Stadium: Heysel Stadium; Attendance: 11,746; Referee: Ulrich Nyffenegger (Switzerland)

1983-10-12 EURO 1984 Q	Scotland	1–1	Belgium	Glasgow
	Nicholas 55'		Vercauteren 30'	Stadium: Hampden Park; Attendance: 23,475; Referee: Enzo Barbaresco (Italy)

1983-11-09 EURO 1984 Q	Switzerland	3–1	Belgium	Bern
	Schällibaum 24'; Brigger 76'; Geiger 82'		Vandenbergh 64'	Stadium: Wankdorfstadion; Attendance: 10,000; Referee: Volker Roth (West Germany)

1984-02-29 Friendly	Belgium	0–1	West Germany	Brussels
			Völler 76'	Stadium: Heysel Stadium; Attendance: 18,000; Referee: Albert Thomas (Netherlands)

1984-04-17 Friendly	Poland	0–1	Belgium	Warsaw
			Czerniatynski 89'	Stadium: Polish Army Stadium; Attendance: 20,000; Referee: Radu Petrescu (Romania)

1984-06-06 Friendly	Belgium	2–2	Hungary	Brussels
	Ceulemans 17', 88'		Hajszán 43'; Nyilasi 59'	Stadium: Heysel Stadium; Attendance: 12,800; Referee: Georges Konrath (France)

1984-06-13 EURO 1984 GS	Belgium	2–0	Yugoslavia	Lens
	Vandenbergh 28'; Grün 44'	Report		Stadium: Stade Félix Bollaert; Attendance: 35,000; Referee: Erik Fredriksson (Sweden)

1984-06-16 EURO 1984 GS	France	5–0	Belgium	Nantes
	Platini 3', 74' (pen.), 88'; Giresse 32'; Fernandez 43'	Report		Stadium: Stade de la Beaujoire; Attendance: 51,359; Referee: Robert Valentine (Scotland)

1984-06-19 EURO 1984 GS	Denmark	3–2	Belgium	Strasbourg
	Arnesen 41' (pen.); Brylle 61'; Elkjær 85'	Report	Ceulemans 26'; Vercauteren 38'	Stadium: Stade de la Meinau; Attendance: 36,911; Referee: Adolf Prokop (East Germany)

1984-09-05 Friendly	Belgium	0–2	Argentina	Brussels
			Trobbiani 9'; Ruggeri 36'	Stadium: Heysel Stadium; Attendance: 7,853; Referee: Franz Wöhrer (Austria)

1984-10-17 W.C. 1986 Q	Belgium	3–1	Albania	Brussels
	Claesen 59'; Scifo 83'; Voordeckers 87'		Omuri 69'	Stadium: Heysel Stadium; Attendance: 8,978; Referee: Arto Ravander (Finland)

1984-12-19 W.C. 1986 Q	Greece	0–0	Belgium	Athens
				Stadium: Olympic Stadium; Attendance: 15,000; Referee: Heinz Fahnler (Austria)

1984-12-22 W.C. 1986 Q	Albania	2–0	Belgium	Tirana
	Josa 69'; Minga 86'			Stadium: Qemal Stafa Stadium; Attendance: 19,802; Referee: Victoriano Sánchez Arminio (Spain)

1985-03-27 W.C. 1986 Q	Belgium	2–0	Greece	Brussels
	Vercauteren 69'; Scifo 89'			Stadium: Heysel Stadium; Attendance: 32,000; Referee: Keith Hackett (England)

1985-05-01 W.C. 1986 Q	Belgium	2–0	Poland	Brussels
	Vandenbergh 30'; Vercauteren 52'			Stadium: Heysel Stadium; Attendance: 48,310; Referee: Malcolm Moffat (Northern Ireland)

1985-09-11 W.C. 1986 Q	Poland	0–0	Belgium	Chorzów
				Stadium: Stadion Śląski; Attendance: 70,000; Referee: Robert Valentine (Scotland)

1985-10-16 W.C. 1986 Q RP	Belgium	1–0	Netherlands	Brussels
	Vercauteren 19'			Stadium: Constant Vanden Stock Stadium; Attendance: 30,764; Referee: Pietro D'Elia (Italy)

1985-11-20 W.C. 1986 Q RP	Netherlands	2–1	Belgium	Rotterdam
	Houtman 60'; De Wit 71'		Grün 84'	Stadium: De Kuip; Attendance: 54,000; Referee: George Courtney (England)

1986-02-19 Friendly	Spain	3–0	Belgium	Elche
	Butragueño 3'; Salinas 41'; Maceda 72'			Stadium: Nuevo Altabix; Attendance: 25,000; Referee: Paolo Casarin (Italy)

1986-04-23 Friendly	Belgium	2–0	Bulgaria	Brussels
	Desmet 43'; Vandenbergh 55'			Stadium: Heysel Stadium; Attendance: 4,872; Referee: Dieter Pauly (West Germany)

1986-05-19 Friendly	Belgium	1–3	Yugoslavia	Brussels
	Claesen 60'		Škoro 7'; Gračan 23'; Vujović 27' (pen.)	Stadium: Heysel Stadium; Attendance: 10,000; Referee: Alain Delmer (France)

1986-06-03 W.C. 1986 GS	Mexico	2–1	Belgium	Mexico City
	Quirarte 23'; Sánchez 29'	Report	Vandenbergh 45'	Stadium: Estadio Azteca; Attendance: 110,000; Referee: Carlos Espósito (Argentina)

1986-06-08 W.C. 1986 GS	Iraq	1–2	Belgium	Toluca
	Radhi 59'	Report	Scifo 16'; Claesen 21' (pen.)	Stadium: Estadio Nemesio Díez; Attendance: 20,000; Referee: Jesús Díaz (Colombia)

1986-06-11 W.C. 1986 GS	Paraguay	2–2	Belgium	Toluca
	Cabañas 50', 76'	Report	Vercauteren 30'; Veyt 59'	Stadium: Estadio Nemesio Díez; Attendance: 16,000; Referee: Bogdan Dotchev (Bulgaria)

1986-06-15 W.C. 1986 1/8	Soviet Union	3–4 (a.e.t.)	Belgium	León
	Belanov 27', 70', 111' (pen.)	Report	Scifo 56'; Ceulemans 77'; Demol 102'; Claesen 110'	Stadium: Estadio Nou Camp; Attendance: 32,277; Referee: Erik Fredriksson (Sweden)

1986-06-22 W.C. 1986 QF	Spain	1–1 (a.e.t.) (4–5 p)	Belgium	Puebla
	Señor 85'	Report	Ceulemans 35'	Stadium: Estadio Cuauhtémoc; Attendance: 45,000; Referee: Siegfried Kirschen (East Germany)
	Penalties
	Señor (penalty scored); Eloy (penalty missed); Chendo (penalty scored); Butragueño (penalty scored); Víctor (penalty scored)		(penalty scored) Claesen; (penalty scored) Scifo; (penalty scored) Broos; (penalty scored) Vervoort; (penalty scored) L. Van der Elst

1986-06-25 W.C. 1986 SF	Argentina	2–0	Belgium	Mexico City
	Maradona 51', 63'	Report		Stadium: Estadio Azteca; Attendance: 114,500; Referee: Antonio Márquez Ramírez (Mexico)

1986-06-28 W.C. 1986 3rd-4th	France	4–2 (a.e.t.)	Belgium	Puebla
	Ferreri 27'; Papin 43'; Genghini 104'; Amoros 111' (pen.)	Report	Ceulemans 11'; Claesen 73'	Stadium: Estadio Cuauhtémoc; Attendance: 21,000; Referee: George Courtney (England)

1986-09-10 EURO 1988 Q	Belgium	2–2	Republic of Ireland	Brussels
	Claesen 14'; Scifo 71'		Stapleton 18'; Brady 89'	Stadium: Heysel Stadium; Attendance: 22,212; Referee: Ioan Igna (Romania)

1986-10-14 EURO 1988 Q	Luxembourg	0–6	Belgium	Luxembourg City
			Gerets 6'; Claesen 8', 53', 89' (pen.); Vercauteren 40'; Ceulemans 87'	Stadium: Stade Municipal; Attendance: 9,550; Referee: Krzysztof Czemarmazowicz (Poland)

1986-11-19 EURO 1988 Q	Belgium	1–1	Bulgaria	Brussels
	Janssen 48'		Tanev 63'	Stadium: Heysel Stadium; Attendance: 22,780; Referee: Victoriano Sánchez Arminio (Spain)

1987-02-04 Friendly	Portugal	1–0	Belgium	Braga
	Frasco 45'			Stadium: Estádio Primeiro de Maio; Attendance: 9,000; Referee: Joël Quiniou (France)

1987-04-01 EURO 1988 Q	Belgium	4–1	Scotland	Brussels
	Claesen 9', 55', 85'; Vercauteren 75'		McStay 14'	Stadium: Constant Vanden Stock Stadium; Attendance: 26,650; Referee: Michel Vautrot (France)

1987-04-29 EURO 1988 Q	Republic of Ireland	0–0	Belgium	Dublin
				Stadium: Lansdowne Road; Attendance: 49,000; Referee: Heinz Holzmann (Austria)

1987-09-09 Friendly	Netherlands	0–0	Belgium	Rotterdam
				Stadium: De Kuip; Attendance: 30,311; Referee: Rolf Blattmann (Switzerland)

1987-09-23 EURO 1988 Q	Bulgaria	2–0	Belgium	Sofia
	Sirakov 19'; Tanev 70'			Stadium: Vasil Levski National Stadium; Attendance: 60,000; Referee: Karl-Heinz Tritschler (West Germany)

1987-10-14 EURO 1988 Q	Scotland	2–0	Belgium	Glasgow
	McCoist 14'; McStay 79'			Stadium: Hampden Park; Attendance: 16,052; Referee: Paolo Casarin (Italy)

1987-11-11 EURO 1988 Q	Belgium	3–0	Luxembourg	Brussels
	Ceulemans 17'; Degryse 55'; Creve 81'			Stadium: Heysel Stadium; Attendance: 8,000; Referee: Egil Nervik (Norway)

1988-01-19 Friendly	Israel	2–3	Belgium	Ramat Gan
	Malmilian 57'; Tikva 69'		Degryse 15'; Van der Linden 19'; Grün 47'	Stadium: National Stadium; Attendance: 7,000; Referee: Huták Antal (Hungary)

1988-03-26 Friendly	Belgium	3–0	Hungary	Brussels
	Ceulemans 53' (pen.); Fitos 61' (o.g.); Severeyns 81'			Stadium: Heysel Stadium; Attendance: 8,500; Referee: Heinz Holzmann (Austria)

1988-06-05 Friendly	Denmark	3–1	Belgium	Odense
	Olsen 35'; John Eriksen 37' (pen.), 75'		Ceulemans 6'	Stadium: Odense Stadion; Attendance: 20,622; Referee: Kaj Natri (Finland)

1988-10-12 Friendly	Belgium	1–2	Brazil	Antwerp
	Clijsters 64'		Geovani (?)	Stadium: Bosuilstadion; Attendance: 10,000; Referee: Aron Schmidhuber (West Germany)

1988-10-19 W.C. 1990 Q	Belgium	1–0	Switzerland	Brussels
	Vervoort 29'	Report		Stadium: Heysel Stadium; Attendance: 14,450; Referee: David Syme (Scotland)

1988-11-16 W.C. 1990 Q	Czechoslovakia	0–0	Belgium	Bratislava
		Report		Stadium: Tehelné pole Attendance: 48,000; Referee: Neil Midgley (England)

1989-02-15 W.C. 1990 Q	Portugal	1–1	Belgium	Lisbon
	Paneira 52'	Report	Van der Linden 82'	Stadium: Estádio da Luz; Attendance: 43,501; Referee: Gérard Biguet (France)

1989-04-29 W.C. 1990 Q	Belgium	2–1	Czechoslovakia	Brussels
	Degryse 30', 77'	Report	Luhový 41'	Stadium: Heysel Stadium; Attendance: 34,612; Referee: Emilio Soriano Aladrén (Spain)

1989-05-27 Friendly	Belgium	1–0	Yugoslavia	Brussels
	Van der Linden 77' (pen.)			Stadium: Heysel Stadium; Attendance: 2,335; Referee: Serge Muhmenthaler (Switzerland)

1989-06-01 W.C. 1990 Q	Luxembourg	0–5	Belgium	Lille
		Report	Van der Linden 13', 53', 64', 89'; Vervoort 66'	Stadium: Stade Grimonprez Jooris; Attendance: 9,100; Referee: Borislav Aleksandrov (Bulgaria)

1989-06-08 Friendly	Canada	0–2	Belgium	Ottawa
			Ceulemans 58'; Degryse 87'	Stadium: Terry Fox Stadium; Attendance: 3,300; Referee: Adriano Brunetti (Canada)

1989-08-23 Friendly	Belgium	3–0	Denmark	Bruges
	Degryse 22'; Ceulemans 32', 81' (pen.)			Stadium: Olympiastadion; Attendance: 6,933; Referee: Cees Bakker (Netherlands)

1989-09-06 W.C. 1990 Q	Belgium	3–0	Portugal	Brussels
	Ceulemans 34'; Van der Linden 59', 69'	Report		Stadium: Heysel Stadium; Attendance: 28,250; Referee: Aleksey Spirin (Soviet Union)

1989-10-11 W.C. 1990 Q	Switzerland	2–2	Belgium	Basel
	Knup 51'; Türkyilmaz 60'	Report	Degryse 57'; Geiger 72' (o.g.)	Stadium: St. Jakob Stadium; Attendance: 5,000; Referee: Lajos Hartmann (Hungary)

1989-10-25 W.C. 1990 Q	Belgium	1–1	Luxembourg	Brussels
	Versavel 84'	Report	Hellers 88'	Stadium: Heysel Stadium; Attendance: 11,600; Referee: Guðmundur Haraldsson (Iceland)

== See also ==
- Competitive record of the Belgium national football team (with tournament history and all-time team record)
