= UEFA Euro 1984 qualifying Group 6 =

Football tournament qualification stage

Standings and results for Group 6 of the UEFA Euro 1984 qualifying tournament.

Group 6 consisted of Albania, Austria, Northern Ireland, Turkey and defending champions West Germany. Group winners were West Germany, who won the group ahead of Northern Ireland on goal difference.

== Final table ==
Pos	Team	Pld	W	D	L	GF	GA	GD	Pts	Qualification	(West Germany)	(Northern Ireland)	(Austria)	(Turkey)	(Albania)
1	West Germany	8	5	1	2	15	5	+10	11	Qualify for final tournament	—	0–1	3–0	5–1	2–1
2	Northern Ireland	8	5	1	2	8	5	+3	11		1–0	—	3–1	2–1	1–0
3	Austria	8	4	1	3	15	10	+5	9		0–0	2–0	—	4–0	5–0
4	Turkey	8	3	1	4	8	16	−8	7		0–3	1–0	3–1	—	1–0
5	Albania	8	0	2	6	4	14	−10	2		1–2	0–0	1–2	1–1	—

Source: UEFA
Rules for classification: Qualification tiebreakers

== Results ==
22 September 1982

Austria	5–0	Albania
Hagmayr 24'; Gasselich 40'; Kola 63' (o.g.); Weber 66'; Brauneder 81'	(Details)

Gerhard Hanappi Stadium, Vienna
Attendance: 9,111
Referee: Yordan Zhezhov (Bulgaria)

13 October 1982

Austria	2–0	Northern Ireland
Schachner 3', 39'	(Details)

Praterstadion, Vienna
Attendance: 9,885
Referee: Valeri Butenko (Soviet Union)

27 October 1982

Turkey	1–0	Albania
Kocabıyık 86'	(Details)

Atatürk Stadium, İzmir
Attendance: 27,702
Referee: Ioan Igna (Romania)

17 November 1982

Austria	4–0	Turkey
Polster 10'; Pezzey 34'; Prohaska 38' (pen.); Schachner 53'	(Details)

Gerhard Hanappi Stadium, Vienna
Attendance: 9,614
Referee: Aleksander Suchanek (Poland)

17 November 1982

Northern Ireland	1–0	West Germany
Stewart 18'	(Details)

Windsor Park, Belfast
Attendance: 20,522
Referee: Rolf Nyhus (Norway)

15 December 1982

Albania	0–0	Northern Ireland
	(Details)

Qemal Stafa, Tirana
Attendance: 16,898
Referee: André Daina (Switzerland)

30 March 1983

Albania	1–2	West Germany
Targaj 82' (pen.)	(Details)	Völler 53'; Rummenigge 68' (pen.)

Qemal Stafa, Tirana
Attendance: 19,550
Referee: Gianfranco Menegali (Italy)
30 March 1983

Northern Ireland	2–1	Turkey
M.O'Neill 5'; McClelland 18'	(Details)	Şengün 55'

Windsor Park, Belfast
Attendance: 15,093
Referee: Alain Delmer (France)

23 April 1983

Turkey	0–3	West Germany
	(Details)	Rummenigge 30' (pen.), 71'; Dremmler 36'

Atatürk Stadium, İzmir
Attendance: 59,637
Referee: Vojtech Christov (Czechoslovakia)

27 April 1983

Austria	0–0	West Germany
	(Details)

Praterstadion, Vienna
Attendance: 60,430
Referee: Brian McGinlay (Scotland)

27 April 1983

Northern Ireland	1–0	Albania
Stewart 54'	(Details)

Windsor Park, Belfast
Attendance: 10,612
Referee: Ib Nielsen (Denmark)

11 May 1983

Albania	1–1	Turkey
Çetiner 73' (o.g.)	(Details)	Tekin 34'

Qemal Stafa, Tirana
Attendance: 15,678
Referee: Mircea-Lucian Salomir (Romania)

8 June 1983

Albania	1–2	Austria
Targaj 84'	(Details)	Schachner 5', 58'

Qemal Stafa, Tirana
Attendance: 15,139
Referee: Laszlo Padar (Hungary)

21 September 1983

Northern Ireland	3–1	Austria
Hamilton 28'; Whiteside 67'; M.O'Neill 89'	(Details)	Gasselich 83'

Windsor Park, Belfast
Attendance: 18,013
Referee: Erik Fredriksson (Sweden)

5 October 1983

West Germany	3–0	Austria
Rummenigge 3'; Völler 18', 20'	(Details)

Parkstadion, Gelsenkirchen
Attendance: 65,496
Referee: Luigi Agnolin (Italy)

12 October 1983

Turkey	1–0	Northern Ireland
Yula 17'	(Details)

19 Mayıs Stadium, Ankara
Attendance: 21,096
Referee: Romualdas Yushka (Soviet Union)

26 October 1983

West Germany	5–1	Turkey
Völler 44', 65'; Rummenigge 60', 74' (pen.); Stielike 66'	(Details)	Şengün 69'

Olympiastadion, Berlin
Attendance: 30,457
Referee: Edvard Sostarić (Yugoslavia)

16 November 1983

Turkey	3–1	Austria
Tüfekçi 62'; Yula 69', 76' (pen.)	(Details)	Baumeister 71'

Ali Sami Yen Stadium, Istanbul
Attendance: 21,310
Referee: Roger Schoeters (Belgium)
16 November 1983

West Germany	0–1	Northern Ireland
	(Details)	Whiteside 50'

Volksparkstadion, Hamburg
Attendance: 58,441
Referee: Károly Palotai (Hungary)

20 November 1983

West Germany	2–1	Albania
Rummenigge 23'; Strack 79'	(Details)	Tomorri 22'

Ludwigsparkstadion, Saarbrücken
Attendance: 37,560
Referee: Anders Mattsson (Finland)

== Goalscorers ==
There were 50 goals scored in 20 matches, for an average of 2.5 goals per match.

7 goals

- (Germany national football team) Karl-Heinz Rummenigge

5 goals

- (Austria national football team) Walter Schachner
- (Germany national football team) Rudi Völler

2 goals

- (Albania national football team) Muhedin Targaj
- (Austria national football team) Felix Gasselich
- (Austria national football team) Max Hagmayr
- (Northern Ireland national football team) Martin O'Neill
- (Northern Ireland national football team) Ian Stewart
- (Northern Ireland national football team) Norman Whiteside
- (Turkey national football team) Hasan Şengün
- (Turkey national football team) Selçuk Yula

1 goal

- (Albania national football team) Genc Tomorri
- (Austria national football team) Ernst Baumeister
- (Austria national football team) Karl Brauneder
- (Austria national football team) Bruno Pezzey
- (Austria national football team) Toni Polster
- (Austria national football team) Herbert Prohaska
- (Northern Ireland national football team) Billy Hamilton
- (Northern Ireland national football team) John McClelland
- (Turkey national football team) Arif Kocabıyık
- (Turkey national football team) Metin Tekin
- (Turkey national football team) Fatih Terim
- (Turkey national football team) İlyas Tüfekçi
- (Germany national football team) Wolfgang Dremmler
- (Germany national football team) Uli Stielike
- (Germany national football team) Gerhard Strack

1 own goal

- (Albania national football team) Agustin Kola (against Austria)
- (Turkey national football team) Raşit Çetiner (against Albania)
