= UEFA Euro 1984 qualifying Group 4 =

Football tournament qualification stage

Standings and results for Group 4 of the UEFA Euro 1984 qualifying tournament.

Group 4 consisted of Bulgaria, Norway, Wales and Yugoslavia. Group winners were Yugoslavia, who finished a point clear of second-placed Wales thanks to an injury-time winning goal in the final group match.

== Final table ==
Pos	Team	Pld	W	D	L	GF	GA	GD	Pts	Qualification	(Socialist Federal Republic of Yugoslavia)	(Wales)	(Bulgaria)	(Norway)
1	Yugoslavia	6	3	2	1	12	11	+1	8	Qualify for final tournament	—	4–4	3–2	2–1
2	Wales	6	2	3	1	7	6	+1	7		1–1	—	1–0	1–0
3	Bulgaria	6	2	1	3	7	8	−1	5		0–1	1–0	—	2–2
4	Norway	6	1	2	3	7	8	−1	4		3–1	0–0	1–2	—

Source: UEFA
Rules for classification: Qualification tiebreakers

== Results ==
22 September 1982

Wales	1–0	Norway
Rush 30'	Report

Vetch Field, Swansea
Attendance: 4,340
Referee: Joël Quiniou (France)

13 October 1982

Norway	3–1	Yugoslavia
Tom Lund 5'; Larsen Økland 67'; Hareide 88'	Report	Savić 74'

Ullevaal Stadion, Oslo
Attendance: 12,264
Referee: Alojzy Jarguz (Poland)

27 October 1982

Bulgaria	2–2	Norway
Velichkov 13'; Nikolov 68'	Report	Thoresen 17' (pen.); Larsen Økland 66'

Vasil Levski National Stadium, Sofia
Attendance: 12,746
Referee: Antonios Vassaras (Greece)

17 November 1982

Bulgaria	0–1	Yugoslavia
	Report	N. Stojković 36'

Vasil Levski National Stadium, Sofia
Attendance: 8,268
Referee: Paolo Casarin (Italy)

15 December 1982

Yugoslavia	4–4	Wales
Z. Cvetković 14'; Živković 17'; Kranjčar 37'; Ješić 66'	Report	Flynn 6'; Rush 38'; Jones 70'; R. James 80'

Gradski Stadion, Titograd
Attendance: 12,090
Referee: Alexis Ponnet (Belgium)

27 April 1983

Wales	1–0	Bulgaria
Charles 72'	Report

Racecourse Ground, Wrexham
Attendance: 9,006
Referee: Siegfried Kirschen (East Germany)

7 September 1983

Norway	1–2	Bulgaria
Hareide 4'	Report	Mladenov 11'; Sirakov 51'

Ullevaal Stadion, Oslo
Attendance: 14,383
Referee: Heinz Fahnler (Austria)

21 September 1983

Norway	0–0	Wales
	Report

Ullevaal Stadion, Oslo
Attendance: 15,899
Referee: Vojtech Christov (Czechoslovakia)

12 October 1983

Yugoslavia	2–1	Norway
Zl. Vujović 21'; Sušić 40'	Report	Thoresen 89'

Stadion JNA, Belgrade
Attendance: 9,169
Referee: Adolf Prokop (East Germany)

16 November 1983

Bulgaria	1–0	Wales
Gochev 54'	Report

Vasil Levski National Stadium, Sofia
Attendance: 4,273
Referee: Dieter Pauly (West Germany)

14 December 1983

Wales	1–1	Yugoslavia
R. James 54'	Report	Baždarević 81'

Ninian Park, Cardiff
Attendance: 24,902
Referee: Erik Fredriksson (Sweden)

21 December 1983

Yugoslavia	3–2	Bulgaria
Sušić 31', 53'; Radanović 90+1'	Report	Iskrenov 28'; Dimitrov 60'

Gradski stadion u Poljudu, Split
Attendance: 29,331
Referee: Augusto Lamo Castillo (Spain)

== Goalscorers ==
There were 33 goals scored in 12 matches, for an average of 2.75 goals per match.

3 goals

- (Socialist Federal Republic of Yugoslavia) Safet Sušić

2 goals

- (Norway) Åge Hareide
- (Norway) Arne Larsen Økland
- (Norway) Hallvar Thoresen
- (Wales) Robbie James
- (Wales) Ian Rush

1 goal

- (Bulgaria) Georgi Dimitrov
- (Bulgaria) Rusi Gochev
- (Bulgaria) Bozhidar Iskrenov
- (Bulgaria) Stoycho Mladenov
- (Bulgaria) Plamen Nikolov
- (Bulgaria) Nasko Sirakov
- (Bulgaria) Boycho Velichkov
- (Norway) Tom Lund
- (Wales) Jeremy Charles
- (Wales) Brian Flynn
- (Wales) Joey Jones
- (Socialist Federal Republic of Yugoslavia) Mehmed Baždarević
- (Socialist Federal Republic of Yugoslavia) Zvjezdan Cvetković
- (Socialist Federal Republic of Yugoslavia) Miodrag Ješić
- (Socialist Federal Republic of Yugoslavia) Zlatko Kranjčar
- (Socialist Federal Republic of Yugoslavia) Ljubomir Radanović
- (Socialist Federal Republic of Yugoslavia) Dušan Savić
- (Socialist Federal Republic of Yugoslavia) Nenad Stojković
- (Socialist Federal Republic of Yugoslavia) Zlatko Vujović
- (Socialist Federal Republic of Yugoslavia) Zvonko Živković
