= 1985–86 FK Partizan season =

Partizan
1985–86 season
- President: Dragan Papović
- Head coach: Nenad Bjeković
- Yugoslav First League: Winners
- Yugoslav Cup: Quarter-finals
- UEFA Cup: Second round
- Top goalscorer: League: All: Zvonko Varga
- Average home league attendance: 13,765

The 1985–86 season was the 40th season in FK Partizan's existence. This article shows player statistics and matches that the club played during the 1985–86 season.

== Friendlies ==
1 February 1986 Titograd tournament	Sutjeska Niksic (Socialist Federal Republic of Yugoslavia)	2–1	(Socialist Federal Republic of Yugoslavia) FK Partizan	Titograd
			Djelmas	Stadium: Pod Goricom

2 February 1986 Titograd tournament	Partizan (Socialist Federal Republic of Yugoslavia)	1–0	(Socialist Federal Republic of Yugoslavia) Vardar Skoplje	Titograd
	Živkovic			Stadium: Pod Goricom

8 February 1986 Mostar tournament	FK Sarajevo (Socialist Federal Republic of Yugoslavia)	2–1	(Socialist Federal Republic of Yugoslavia) FK Partizan	Mostar
			Djelmas	Stadium: Rodjeni

9 February 1986 Mostar tournament	Partizan (Socialist Federal Republic of Yugoslavia)	2–2 (4-3)	(Hungary) FK Honved	Mostar
	Djukic Sadriu			Stadium: Rodjeni

== Players ==
=== Squad information ===
players (league matches/league goals):
(Socialist Federal Republic of Yugoslavia) Fahrudin Omerović (34/0) -goalkeeper-
(Socialist Federal Republic of Yugoslavia) Zvonko Varga (32/17)
(Socialist Federal Republic of Yugoslavia) Ljubomir Radanović (32/4)
(Socialist Federal Republic of Yugoslavia) Vladimir Vermezović (32/1)
(Socialist Federal Republic of Yugoslavia) Admir Smajić (30/2)
(Socialist Federal Republic of Yugoslavia) Slobodan Rojević (29/0)
(Socialist Federal Republic of Yugoslavia) Goran Stevanović (28/3)
(Socialist Federal Republic of Yugoslavia) Nebojša Vučićević (27/6)
(Socialist Federal Republic of Yugoslavia) Miloš Đelmaš (26/11)
(Socialist Federal Republic of Yugoslavia) Zvonko Živković (24/12)
(Socialist Federal Republic of Yugoslavia) Bajro Župić (24/0)
(Socialist Federal Republic of Yugoslavia) Milonja Đukić (23/1)
(Socialist Federal Republic of Yugoslavia) Vlado Čapljić (21/3)
(Socialist Federal Republic of Yugoslavia) Radoslav Nikodijević (17/0)
(Socialist Federal Republic of Yugoslavia) Miodrag Bajović (15/0)
(Socialist Federal Republic of Yugoslavia) Miodrag Radović (12/0)
(Socialist Federal Republic of Yugoslavia) Milinko Pantić (9/2)
(Socialist Federal Republic of Yugoslavia) Milorad Bajović (6/0)
(Socialist Federal Republic of Yugoslavia) Dragan Mance (5/2) died 3 September 1985 in a car accident
(Socialist Federal Republic of Yugoslavia) Goran Bogdanović (5/0)
(Socialist Federal Republic of Yugoslavia) Jovica Kolb (4/1)
(Socialist Federal Republic of Yugoslavia) Isa Sadriu (4/0)

== Competitions ==
=== Yugoslav First League ===
Pos	Team	Pld	W	D	L	GF	GA	GD	Pts	Qualification or relegation
1	Partizan (C)	34	21	7	6	65	29	+36	49	Qualification for UEFA Cup first round
2	Red Star Belgrade	34	21	7	6	73	38	+35	49	Qualification for European Cup first round
3	Velež	34	13	11	10	64	50	+14	37	Qualification for Cup Winners' Cup first round
4	Hajduk Split	34	15	7	12	55	44	+11	37	Qualification for UEFA Cup first round
5	Rijeka	34	12	13	9	42	31	+11	37	Qualification for UEFA Cup first round

Source: rsssf.org
Rules for classification: 1) points; 2) goal difference; 3) number of goals scored.
(C) Champions

==== Matches ====
11 August 1985 1	Partizan	3–0	Sloboda Tuzla	Belgrade
	Đukić 10'; Mance 14'; Smajić 72'			Stadium: JNA Stadium

18 August 1985 2	OFK Beograd	0–0	Partizan	Belgrade

21 August 1985 3	Partizan	1–1	Crvena zvezda	Belgrade
	Vučićević 90'		Djurovski 63' (pen.)	Stadium: JNA Stadium; Attendance: 50,000

25 August 1985 4	Vardar	2–2	Partizan	Skopje
	Ringov 5'; Setinov 7'		Varga 65'; Vučićević 68'	Attendance: 20,000

1 September 1985 5	Partizan	2–1	Budućnost	Belgrade
	Varga 1'; Mance 8' (pen.)		Brnović 90' (pen.)	Stadium: JNA Stadium

8 September 1985 6	Partizan	1–0	Priština	Belgrade
	Radanović 90'			Stadium: JNA Stadium

15 September 1985 7	Sarajevo	1–1	Partizan	Sarajevo
	67'		Živković 59'

6 October 1985 8	Partizan	2–0	Velež	Belgrade
	Varga 7'; Radanović 25'			Stadium: JNA Stadium; Attendance: 10,000

9 October 1985 9	Osijek	0–1	Partizan	Osijek
			Varga 50'

13 October 1985 10	Partizan	2–1	Hajduk Split	Belgrade
	Đelmaš 34' (pen.); Živković 39'		Weber 83'	Stadium: JNA Stadium

13 October 1985 11	Partizan	3–1	Vojvodina	Belgrade
	Đelmaš 21' (pen.), 28'; Stevanović 39'		Marić 2'	Stadium: JNA Stadium

27 October 1985 12	Čelik	0–2	Partizan	Zenica
			Varga 9'; Vermezović 89'

3 November 1985 13	Partizan	2–2	Dinamo Vinkovci	Belgrade
	Smajić 8'; Varga 58'		Ručević 33'; Bogdanović 68'	Stadium: JNA Stadium

9 November 1985 14	Sutjeska Nikšić	1–4	Partizan	Nikšić
	Drizić 33'		Čapljić 23' (pen.); Vučićević 44'; Živković 73'; Varga 78'	Attendance: 15,000

24 November 1985 15	Rijeka	1–0	Partizan	Rijeka
	Janković			Attendance: 8,000

1 December 1985 16	Partizan	3–2	Dinamo Zagreb	Belgrade
	Vučićević 2'; Čapljić (pen.); Živković 66'		Besek 27'; Cvetković 35'	Stadium: JNA Stadium

3 December 1985 17	Željezničar	0–2	Partizan	Sarajevo
			Živković 8'; Kolb 11'

2 March 1986 18	Sloboda Tuzla	3–0	Partizan	Tuzla
	74'; 76'; 81' (pen.)

9 March 1986 19	Partizan	2–0	OFK Beograd	Belgrade
	Đelmaš (pen.); Varga			Stadium: JNA Stadium

15 March 1986 20	Crvena zvezda	2–1	Partizan	Belgrade
	Nikolić 46'; Musemić 83'		Čapljić 47' (pen.)	Stadium: Marakana; Attendance: 70,000

23 March 1986 21	Partizan	2–1	Vardar	Belgrade
	Varga 21', 37'		Petrov 72'	Stadium: JNA Stadium

30 March 1986 22	Budućnost	1–0	Partizan	Titograd
	27'

6 April 1986 23	Partizan	4–1	Sutjeska Nikšić	Belgrade
	Stevanović 22'; Đelmaš 33' (pen.); Varga 56'; Radanović 86'		Bursać 39'	Stadium: JNA Stadium

13 April 1986 24	Priština	1–0	Partizan	Priština
	80'			Attendance: 40,000

20 April 1986 25	Partizan	2–0	Sarajevo	Belgrade
	Đelmaš 63' (pen.) ?' (pen.)			Stadium: JNA Stadium

27 April 1986 26	Velež	0–0	Partizan	Mostar

3 May 1986 27	Partizan	2–0	Osijek	Belgrade
	Varga 5'; Đelmaš 69'			Stadium: JNA Stadium

10 May 1986 28	Hajduk Split	2–1	Partizan	Split
	Omerović 68' (o.g.); Zl. Vujović 80' (pen.)		Živković 26'	Stadium: Poljud

18 May 1986 29	Vojvodina	0–4	Partizan	Novi Sad
			Varga 6', 58'; Živković 32'; Đelmaš ?'	Stadium: Stadion Karađorđe

25 May 1986 30	Partizan	4–1	Čelik	Belgrade
	Živković 26'; Stevanović 34'; Stevanović 43' (pen.); Vučićević 81'		Fileš 65'	Stadium: Marakana*; Attendance: 25,000

28 May 1986 31	Dinamo Vinkovci	1–4	Partizan	Vinkovci
	Berecko 53'		Živković 12', 84', 90'; Varga 18'	Attendance: 15,000

1 June 1986 32	Partizan	1–1	Rijeka	Belgrade
	Radanović 81'		Mladenović 6'	Stadium: JNA Stadium; Attendance: 20,000

8 June 1986 33	Dinamo Zagreb	2–3	Partizan	Zagreb
	Cvetković 73' (pen.); Mlinarić 75' (pen.)		Varga 23', 79'; Pantić 80'	Stadium: Stadion Maksimir; Attendance: 25,000

14 June 1986 34	Partizan	4–0	Željezničar	Belgrade
	Živković 26'; Smajić 40'; Varga 42'; Pantić			Stadium: JNA Stadium; Attendance: 40,000

=== Yugoslav Cup ===
30 October 1985 Round of 32	Lovćen	0–4	Partizan	Cetinje
			Stevanović; Živković; Radanović	Attendance: 4,000

20 November 1985 Round of 16	Partizan	5–0	14. Oktobar	Belgrade
	Živković 12', 58'; Varga 22'; Vučićević 29'; Đelmaš 79' (pen.)			Stadium: JNA Stadium

22 February 1986 Quarter-finals	Partizan	1–1 (3–5 p)	Velež	Belgrade
	Varga 59'		80'	Stadium: JNA Stadium

=== UEFA Cup ===
==== First round ====
18 September 1985 First round 1st leg	Portimonense S.C. (Portugal)	1–0	(Socialist Federal Republic of Yugoslavia) Partizan	Portimão, Portugal
	Efigénia 53'			Stadium: Estádio Municipal de Portimão; Referee: Alphonse Costantin (Belgium)

2 October 1985 First round 2nd leg	Partizan (Socialist Federal Republic of Yugoslavia)	4–0 (4 – 1 agg.)	(Portugal) Portimonense S.C.	Belgrade, Yugoslavia
	Vučićević 18', 81', 85'; Đukić 27'			Stadium: JNA Stadium; Attendance: 33,000; Referee: Sadik Deda (Turkey)

==== Second round ====
23 October 1985 Second round 1st leg	Partizan (Socialist Federal Republic of Yugoslavia)	1–1	(France) Nantes	Belgrade, Yugoslavia
	Le Roux 28' (o.g.)		Halilhodžić 68'	Stadium: JNA Stadium; Attendance: 55,000; Referee: Paolo Bergamo (Italy)

6 November 1985 Second round 2nd leg	Nantes (France)	4–0 (5 – 1 agg.)	(Socialist Federal Republic of Yugoslavia) Partizan	Nantes, France
	Jorge Burruchaga 14'; Amisse 51', 88'; Bracigliano 57'			Stadium: La Beaujoire; Referee: Dieter Pauly (Germany)

== See also ==
- List of FK Partizan seasons
