= UEFA Euro 1984 qualifying Group 1 =

Football tournament qualification stage

Standings and results for Group 1 of the UEFA Euro 1984 qualifying tournament.

Group 1 consisted of Belgium, East Germany, Scotland and Switzerland. Group winners were Belgium, who finished 3 points clear of second-placed Switzerland.

== Final table ==
| Pos | Team | Pld | W | D | L | GF | GA | GD | Pts | Qualification | (Belgium) | (Switzerland) | (East Germany) | (Scotland) |
|---|---|---|---|---|---|---|---|---|---|---|---|---|---|---|
| 1 | Belgium | 6 | 4 | 1 | 1 | 12 | 8 | +4 | 9 | Qualify for final tournament | — | 3–0 | 2–1 | 3–2 |
| 2 | Switzerland | 6 | 2 | 2 | 2 | 7 | 9 | −2 | 6 | | 3–1 | — | 0–0 | 2–0 |
| 3 | East Germany | 6 | 2 | 1 | 3 | 7 | 7 | 0 | 5 | | 1–2 | 3–0 | — | 2–1 |
| 4 | Scotland | 6 | 1 | 2 | 3 | 8 | 10 | −2 | 4 | | 1–1 | 2–2 | 2–0 | — |

Source: UEFA
Rules for classification: Qualification tiebreakers

== Results ==
6 October 1982

| Belgium | 3 – 0 | Switzerland |
|---|---|---|
| Lüdi 2' (o.g.); Coeck 48'; Vandenbergh 82' | (Details) |

Heysel Stadium, Brussels
Attendance: 16,808
Referee: Paolo Bergamo (Italy)

13 October 1982

| Scotland | 2 – 0 | East Germany |
|---|---|---|
| Wark 53'; Sturrock 75' | (Details) |

Hampden Park, Glasgow
Attendance: 41,280
Referee: Georges Konrath (France)

17 November 1982

| Switzerland | 2 – 0 | Scotland |
|---|---|---|
| Sulser 49'; Egli 61' | (Details) |

Wankdorf Stadium, Bern
Attendance: 22,198
Referee: Vojtech Christov (Czechoslovakia)

15 December 1982

| Belgium | 3 – 2 | Scotland |
|---|---|---|
| Vandenbergh 25'; Van der Elst 39', 63' | (Details) | Dalglish 13', 35' |

Heysel Stadium, Brussels
Attendance: 48,877
Referee: António José Da Silva Garrido (Portugal)

30 March 1983

| East Germany | 1 – 2 | Belgium |
|---|---|---|
| Streich 82' | (Details) | Van Der Elst 35'; Vandenbergh 70' |

Zentralstadion, Leipzig
Attendance: 70,188
Referee: John Carpenter (Republic of Ireland)
30 March 1983

| Scotland | 2 – 2 | Switzerland |
|---|---|---|
| Wark 70'; Nicholas 75' | (Details) | Egli 14'; Hermann 57' |

Hampden Park, Glasgow
Attendance: 36,923
Referee: Charles Corver (Netherlands)

27 April 1983

| Belgium | 2 – 1 | East Germany |
|---|---|---|
| Ceulemans 18'; Coeck 39' | (Details) | Streich 9' |

Heysel Stadium, Brussels
Attendance: 43,894
Referee: Emilio Guruceta Muro (Spain)

14 May 1983

| Switzerland | 0 – 0 | East Germany |
|---|---|---|
| | (Details) |

Wankdorf Stadium, Bern
Attendance: 29,738
Referee: Rolf Ericsson (Sweden)

12 October 1983

| East Germany | 3 – 0 | Switzerland |
|---|---|---|
| Richter 45'; Ernst 73'; Streich 90' | (Details) |

Friedrich-Ludwig-Jahn-Sportpark, East Berlin
Attendance: 6,755
Referee: Keith Hackett (England)
12 October 1983

| Scotland | 1 – 1 | Belgium |
|---|---|---|
| Nicholas 55' | (Details) | Vercauteren 30' |

Hampden Park, Glasgow
Attendance: 23,475
Referee: Enzo Barbaresco (Italy)

9 November 1983

| Switzerland | 3 – 1 | Belgium |
|---|---|---|
| Schällibaum 23'; Brigger 75'; Geiger 89' | (Details) | Vandenbergh 63' |

Wankdorf Stadium, Bern
Attendance: 7,446
Referee: Volker Roth (West Germany)

16 November 1983

| East Germany | 2 – 1 | Scotland |
|---|---|---|
| Kreer 34'; Streich 43' | (Details) | Bannon 77' |

Kurt-Wabbel Stadion, Halle
Attendance: 14,729
Referee: Franz Wöhrer (Austria)

== Goalscorers ==
There were 34 goals scored in 12 matches, for an average of 2.83 goals per match.

4 goals

- (Belgium) Erwin Vandenbergh
- (East Germany) Joachim Streich

3 goals

- (Belgium) François Van der Elst

2 goals

- (Belgium) Ludo Coeck
- (Scotland) Kenny Dalglish
- (Scotland) Charlie Nicholas
- (Scotland) John Wark
- (Switzerland) André Egli

1 goal

- (Belgium) Jan Ceulemans
- (Belgium) Franky Vercauteren
- (East Germany) Rainer Ernst
- (East Germany) Ronald Kreer
- (East Germany) Hans Richter
- (Scotland) Eamonn Bannon
- (Scotland) Paul Sturrock
- (Switzerland) Jean-Paul Brigger
- (Switzerland) Alain Geiger
- (Switzerland) Heinz Hermann
- (Switzerland) Marco Schällibaum
- (Switzerland) Claudio Sulser

1 own goal

- (Switzerland) Heinz Ludi (against Belgium)
