= UEFA Euro 1984 qualifying Group 2 =

International football competition

Standings and results for Group 2 of the UEFA Euro 1984 qualifying tournament.

Group 2 consisted of Finland, Poland, Portugal and USSR. Group winners were Portugal, who finished a point clear of second-placed USSR.

== Final table ==
Pos	Team	Pld	W	D	L	GF	GA	GD	Pts	Qualification	(Portugal)	(Soviet Union)	(Poland)	(Finland)
1	Portugal	6	5	0	1	11	6	+5	10	Qualify for final tournament	—	1–0	2–1	5–0
2	Soviet Union	6	4	1	1	11	2	+9	9		5–0	—	2–0	2–0
3	Poland	6	1	2	3	6	9	−3	4		0–1	1–1	—	1–1
4	Finland	6	0	1	5	3	14	−11	1		0–2	0–1	2–3	—

Source: UEFA
Rules for classification: Qualification tiebreakers

== Results ==
8 September 1982

Finland	2–3	Poland
Valvee 83'; Kousa 84'	(Details)	Smolarek 16' (pen.); Dziekanowski 27'; Kupcewicz 72'

Kuopion Keskuskenttä, Kuopio
Attendance: 3,529
Referee: Marcel Van Langenhove (Belgium)

22 September 1982

Finland	0–2	Portugal
	(Details)	Nené 15'; Oliveira 89'

Helsinki Olympic Stadium, Helsinki
Attendance: 3,132
Referee: Klaus Scheurell (East Germany)

10 October 1982

Portugal	2–1	Poland
Nené 2'; Gomes 82'	(Details)	Król 90'

Estádio da Luz, Lisbon
Attendance: 56,809
Referee: Franz Wöhrer (Austria)

13 October 1982

Soviet Union	2–0	Finland
Baltacha 2'; Andreyev 57'	(Details)

Central Lenin Stadium, Moscow
Attendance: 18,086
Referee: Jack Baumann (Switzerland)

17 April 1983

Poland	1–1	Finland
Smolarek 2' (pen.)	(Details)	Janas 5' (o.g.)

Stadion Dziesięciolecia, Warsaw
Attendance: 63,000
Referee: Reidar Bjørnestad (Norway)

27 April 1983

Soviet Union	5–0	Portugal
Cherenkov 16', 63'; Rodionov 40'; Demyanenko 53'; Larionov 86'	(Details)

Central Lenin Stadium, Moscow
Attendance: 82,114
Referee: John Hunting (England)

22 May 1983

Poland	1–1	Soviet Union
Boniek 16'	(Details)	Wójcicki 62' (o.g.)

Silesian Stadium, Chorzów
Attendance: 69,044
Referee: Luigi Agnolin (Italy)

1 June 1983

Finland	0–1	Soviet Union
	(Details)	Blokhin 75'

Helsinki Olympic Stadium, Helsinki
Attendance: 16,966
Referee: Dušan Krchnak (Czechoslovakia)

21 September 1983

Portugal	5–0	Finland
Jordão 18'; Carlos Manuel 23'; Ikäläinen 47' (o.g.); José Luis 83'; Oliveira 86'	(Details)

Estádio José Alvalade, Lisbon
Attendance: 15,136
Referee: Karl-Heinz Tritschler (West Germany)

9 October 1983

Soviet Union	2–0	Poland
Demyanenko 10'; Blokhin 62'	(Details)

Central Lenin Stadium, Moscow
Attendance: 72,504
Referee: Jan Keizer (Netherlands)

28 October 1983

Poland	0–1	Portugal
	(Details)	Carlos Manuel 32'

Olympic Stadium, Wrocław
Attendance: 8,625
Referee: Ulf Eriksson (Sweden)

13 November 1983

Portugal	1–0	Soviet Union
Jordão 44' (pen.)	(Details)

Estádio da Luz, Lisbon
Attendance: 32,243
Referee: Georges Konrath (France)

== Goalscorers ==
There were 31 goals scored in 12 matches, for an average of 2.58 goals per match.

2 goals

- (Poland) Włodzimierz Smolarek
- (Portugal) Rui Jordão
- (Portugal) Carlos Manuel
- (Portugal) Nené
- (Portugal) António Oliveira
- (Soviet Union) Oleg Blokhin
- (Soviet Union) Fyodor Cherenkov
- (Soviet Union) Anatoliy Demyanenko

1 goal

- (Finland) Keijo Kousa
- (Finland) Ari Valvee
- (Poland) Zbigniew Boniek
- (Poland) Dariusz Dziekanowski
- (Poland) Paweł Król
- (Poland) Janusz Kupcewicz
- (Portugal) Fernando Gomes
- (Portugal) José Luís
- (Soviet Union) Sergey Andreyev
- (Soviet Union) Sergei Baltacha
- (Soviet Union) Nikolay Larionov
- (Soviet Union) Sergey Rodionov

1 own goal

- (Finland) Jukka Ikäläinen (against Portugal)
- (Poland) Paweł Janas (against Finland)
- (Poland) Roman Wójcicki (against Soviet Union)
