= Erwin Vandenbergh =

Belgian footballer (born 1959)

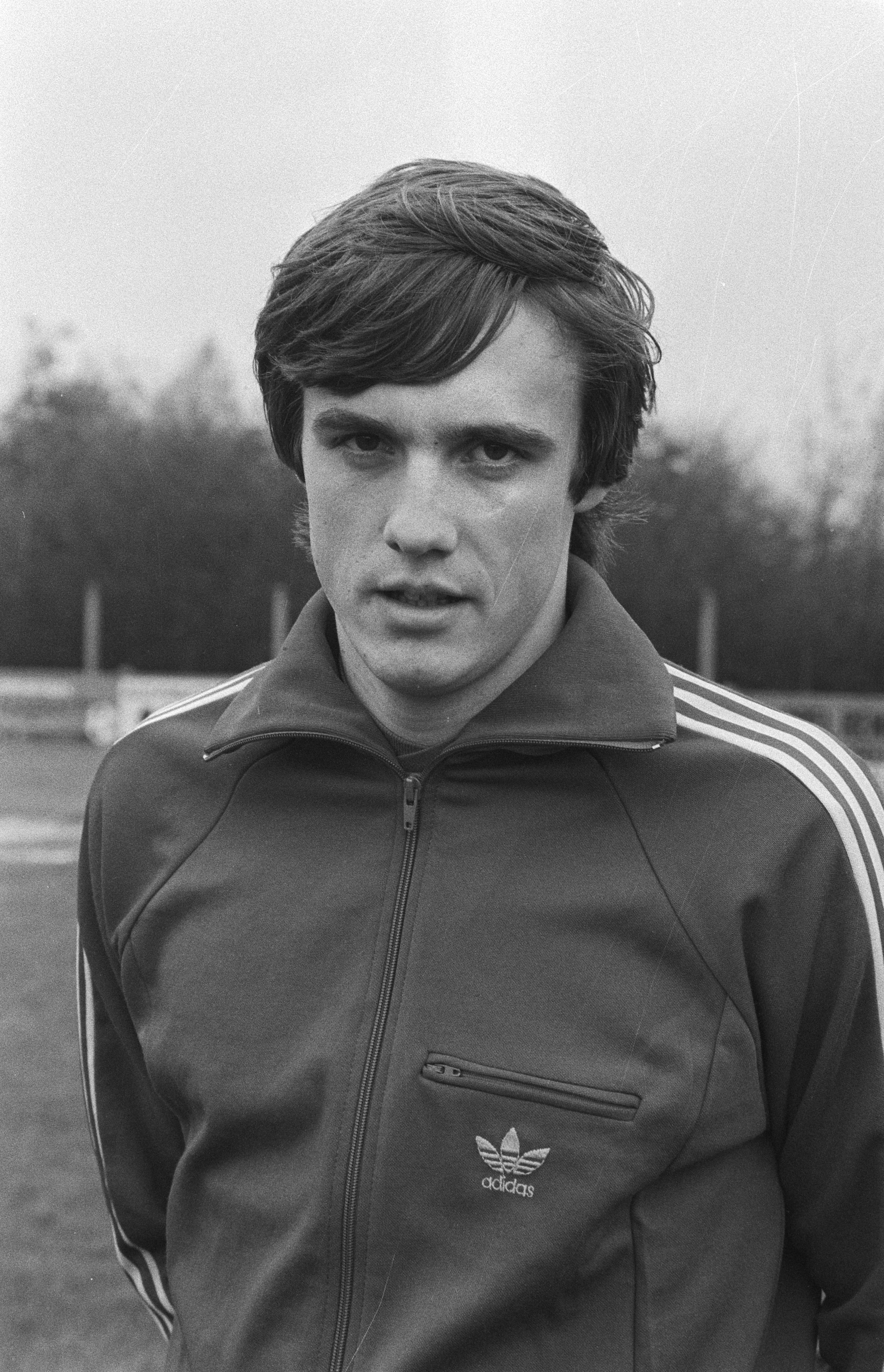
- Vandenbergh in 1980

Personal information
- Date of birth: 26 January 1959 (age 67)
- Place of birth: Ramsel, Herselt, Belgium
- Height: 1.84 m (6 ft 0 in)
- Position: Forward

Senior career*
Years	Team	Apps	(Gls)
1976–1982	Lierse	178	(117)
1982–1986	Anderlecht	121	(87)
1986–1990	Lille	114	(38)
1990–1994	Gent	110	(47)
1994–1995	Molenbeek	21	(4)
Total		544	(293)

International career
1979–1991	Belgium	48	(20)

Managerial career
- 1995: Westerlo
- * Club domestic league appearances and goals

Erwin Vandenbergh (Dutch pronunciation: [ˈɛrʋɪɱ vɑndə(m)ˈbɛr(ə)x]; born 26 January 1959) is a Belgian retired professional footballer who played as a forward. Between 1979 and 1991, he finished six times as topscorer of the Belgian First Division (a still standing record), with three clubs (the first three with Lierse, the following two with Anderlecht, and the last one with Gent). In 1980, he was European topscorer with 39 goals out of 34 games. As a Belgium national team regular, Vandenbergh scored a memorable victory goal against Argentina in the opening game of the 1982 World Cup in Spain.

Vandenbergh also played for the French club Lille with his Belgium national team partner Filip Desmet under the management of another fellow Belgian Georges Heylens. His son, Kevin Vandenbergh, also became a professional football striker, mainly at Genk and also for the Belgian national team.

== Club career ==
=== Lierse ===
At the age of 16, Erwin Vandenbergh made his debut in the team of his hometown, Ramsel. In his first season, the striker immediately scored 18 goals in 28 games. He was quickly noticed by the Belgian elite clubs. Vandenbergh could have gone to Beveren, Diest and Lokeren but he chose the nearby Lierse SK, the club he had supported since he was a child. Things went fast. After 6 months with the reserves, his career took off. The young Vandenbergh became the founder of Lierse's rise to the Belgian sub-top. The club was able to force European football in the 1977–78 season after finishing fourth in the standings.

In the 1979–80 season, Erwin Vandenbergh became the national and European top scorer with 39 goals, despite the fact that his team only finished sixth in the competition. Juventus, Naples, Hamburg and Bayern Munich were angling for his services, without success. He also became top scorer in the following season (24 goals) and in 1981 he won the Golden Shoe. In the 1981–82 season, he became Belgium's top scorer once more with 25 goals.

As a result of all that success, Lierse SK had to let their forward go to Anderlecht for 60 million Belgian francs (1.5 million euros), a fortune at the time.

=== Anderlecht ===
Anderlecht also bought forward Alex Czerniatynski that season. The collaboration between the two was initially difficult. Erwin Vandenbergh could not thrive in the demanding “Ivic System”. When the Croat was fired 3 months later, Erwin Vandenbergh breathed a sigh of relief. Under the new coach, Anderlecht club icon Paul Van Himst, things went well immediately. He became top scorer in the national competition for the fourth time in a row, with 20 goals.

In his first season with the club, he also immediately won his first trophy with a team: the UEFA Cup. He just missed the title of top scorer in that tournament, as Zoran Filipović, player of their opponents in the final Benfica, had scored 1 time more with 8 goals.

Vandenbergh won his first national title with Anderlecht in the 1984–85 season. The final of the UEFA Cup was also reached again, but after penalties the trophy went to Tottenham.

With the next trainer, problems arose again. The striker thought that the football was too defensive under coach Arie Haan. He scored less, although he still netted 27 goals in the 1985–86 season under the Dutchman. Anderlecht could also extend their title. When Haan left him out of the selection for most of the European Cup matches, his decision was made: he decided to leave, despite the fact that he still had one more season under contract.

=== Lille ===
After the 1986 World Cup, he left for the French Flanders side Lille, which was trained by former Anderlecht star Georges Heylens. Despite an offer from Barcelona, the home-loving Vandenbergh chose a team located close to the Belgian border. Although Vandenbergh would later consider rejecting the Barcelona contract as a mistake.

‘’The only thing I regret in my whole career is that I turned down the offer from Barcelona ’'

— Vandenbergh in 2020

He would stay at the French club for four seasons, scoring 38 goals in the Division 1 and 44 overall. These numbers were generally below his standard. Lille was one of the lowest scoring teams in the competition, no trophies could be won and the club usually finished in the middle of the standings at its best. Coach Georges Heylens left at the end of the 1989–90 season.

=== Gent ===
In 1990, aged 31, Vandenbergh moved to Belgian side AA Gent, coached by his former Anderlecht teammate René Vandereycken. During the 1990–91 season, Gent was also leading the league after 24 games but ultimately had to let the title to his former team Anderlecht. Vandenbergh became top scorer for the sixth and final time, with 23 goals. In the 1991–92 season, Gent surprisingly managed to reach the quarter finals of the UEFA Cup.

=== RWD Molenbeek ===
After his contract with Standard Liège was not extended, coach René Vandereycken moved to Brussels side RWDM. He convinced Erwin Vandenbergh to also make the transfer to the club. Season 1994–95 would be his only one at the club, and immediately his last as a professional footballer.

== International career ==
Erwin Vandenbergh reached a sporting peak quite early, in 1979. At that time, he was the most productive forward in Europe. That did not go unnoticed by then national coach Guy Thys either. He selected the 20-year-old attacker for the Red Devils. His first international match was on 19 December 1979 against Scotland. Belgium won 1–3 and Vandenbergh scored once.

The successful debut made Vandenbergh a regular in the national team in no time. In 1980 he was allowed to go to the European Championship in Italy. Belgium reached the final, but lost to West Germany. Vandenbergh had played three times, but he did not score.

In the run-up to the 1982 World Cup in Spain, Vandenbergh played seven World Cup Cup qualifying matches in which he scored five times. Belgium played the tournament opening match against reigning world champion Argentina in Camp Nou, the stadium of FC Barcelona. Vandenbergh scored the only goal of the match after a long, crooked cross from Frank Vercauteren. Because of the importance of the goal and the cry of joy - Goaaaal, goal, goal! - from the Belgian reporter Rik De Saedeleer, the goal went down in Belgian history as one of the most famous goals ever scored by the Red Devils. De Saedeleer's famous reaction later became the title of Vandenbergh's biography. Belgium eventually won the group, but were eliminated in the next round. Poland and the Soviet Union proved too strong.

Vandenbergh was also present at the 1984 European Championship. Belgium had won silver at the previous European Championship, so expectations were high. Belgian coach Thys saw how his Red Devils started the tournament well. Vandenbergh scored a goal in the first game for the 2–0 victory against Yugoslavia. But the Belgians only ended up third in the group stage, after host country France and Denmark.

At the 1986 World Cup in Mexico, Vandenbergh was 27 years old. It would be his last international tournament with the Red Devils. Belgium got through the group stage as the best third-placed team. Vandenbergh only played against Mexico. In that match, lost with 1–2, he scored the only Belgian goal. Due to an injury, Vandenberg left the squad earlier than expected. The Red Devils eventually reached the semi-finals, but this time Argentina, with star player Maradona, was too strong. Belgium finished the World Cup in fourth place, the best result achieved by the Red Devils until 2018.

Belgium did not qualify for the 1988 European Championship and the then 31-year-old Vandenbergh was not called up for the 1990 World Cup. He had been more or less forgotten at Lille. Guy Thys preferred Nico Claesen and attacking midfielders such as Jan Ceulemans and Marc Degryse. The non-selection seemed to be the end of Vandenbergh with the national team. But a strong season at KAA Gent brought him back into the spotlight. Vandenbergh was allowed to play in the Euro 1992 qualifying matches again and scored his last goal for the Red Devils at the age of 32. That was in the match against Luxembourg on 27 February 1991, which was won 3–0.

== Style of play ==
Vandenbergh can be described as a typical example of a pure striker, capable of making the actions himself but above all instinctively feeling where to position himself to score a goal. Author Raf Willems described him as "A phenomenal finisher but at the same time elegant and aesthetic in his movements. With insight as his greatest quality, as an instinctive gift.".

== Career statistics ==
=== Club ===
Appearances and goals by club, season and competition
Club	Season	League			National cup (Note: Includes Belgian Cup, Coupe de France)		Europe		Total	
Club	Season	Division	Apps	Goals	Apps	Goals	Apps	Goals	Apps	Goals
Lierse	1976–77	First Division	14	2	—		—		14	2
Lierse	1977–78	First Division	34	12	4	4	—		38	16
Lierse	1978–79	First Division	32	15	1	0	5 (Note: Two appearances in UEFA Cup; three appearances in UEFA Intertoto Cup)	2	38	17
Lierse	1979–80	First Division	34	39	1	1	—		35	40
Lierse	1980–81	First Division	33	24	4	2	—		37	26
Lierse	1981–82	First Division	31	25	3	1	—		34	26
Lierse	Total		178	117	13	8	5	2	196	127
Anderlecht	1982–83	First Division	32	20	3	2	12 (Note: Appearances in UEFA Cup)	7	47	29
Anderlecht	1983–84	First Division	29	20	2	1	9	4	40	25
Anderlecht	1984–85	First Division	29	20	5	5	3	3	37	28
Anderlecht	1985–86	First Division	31	27	2	2	5 (Note: Appearances in European Champion Clubs' Cup)	1	38	30
Anderlecht	Total		121	87	12	10	29	15	162	112
Lille	1986–87	Division 1	28	8	3	1	—		31	9
Lille	1987–88	Division 1	30	11	6	2	—		36	13
Lille	1988–89	Division 1	31	14	4	1	—		35	15
Lille	1989–90	Division 1	25	5	3	2	—		28	17
Lille	Total		114	38	16	6	0	0	130	44
AA Gent	1990–91	First Division	34	23	1	0	—		35	23
AA Gent	1991–92	First Division	33	11	6	0	7	2	46	13
AA Gent	1992–93	First Division	21	9	1	0	—		22	9
AA Gent	1993–94	First Division	22	4	—		—		22	4
AA Gent	Total		110	47	8	0	7	2	125	49
RWDM	1994–95	First Division	21	4	1	0	—		22	4
Career total			544	290	50	24	41	19	635	333

=== International ===
National Team	Year	Friendlies		World Cup		European Championships		Total	
National Team	Year	Apps	Goals	Apps	Goals	Apps	Goals	Apps	Goals
Belgium	1979	—		1	1	—		1	1
Belgium	1980	3	3	—		4	3	9	5
Belgium	1981	1	0	—		4	3	5	3
Belgium	1982	3	1	2	2	5	1	10	4
Belgium	1983	1	0	3	2	—		4	2
Belgium	1984	1	0	3	1	—		4	1
Belgium	1985	—		—		4	1	4	1
Belgium	1986	2	1	1	2	1	1	4	2
Belgium	1987	1	0	1	0	—		2	0
Belgium	1988	1	0	—		—		1	0
Belgium	1989	—		—		—		0	0
Belgium	1990	1	0	—		—		1	0
Belgium	1991	1	0	2	1	—		3	1
Total		15	5	16	7	17	8	48	20

Scores and results list Belgium's goal tally first, score column indicates score after each Vandenbergh goal.

List of international goals scored by Erwin Vandenbergh
No.	Cap	Date	Venue	Opponent	Score	Result	Competition
1	1	19 December 1979	Hampden Park, Glasgow, Scotland	Scotland	1–0	3–1	Euro 1980 qualification
2	2	17 February 1980	Stade Municipal, Luxembourg, Luxembourg	Luxembourg	1–0	5–0	Friendly
3	2	17 February 1980	Stade Municipal, Luxembourg, Luxembourg	Luxembourg	3–0	5–0	Friendly
4	4	2 April 1980	Heysel Stadium, Brussels, Belgium	Poland	2–0	2–1	Friendly
5	9	19 November 1980	Heysel Stadium, Brussels, Belgium	Netherlands	1–0 ‡	1–0	1982 World Cup qualification
6	10	21 December 1980	Makario Stadium, Nicosia, Cyprus	Cyprus	1–0	2–0	1982 World Cup qualification
7	11	18 February 1981	Heysel Stadium, Brussels, Belgium	Cyprus	2–0	3–2	1982 World Cup qualification
8	13	29 April 1981	Parc des Princes, Paris, Brussels	France	0–1	2–3	1982 World Cup qualification
9	14	9 September 1981	Heysel Stadium, Brussels, Belgium	France	2–0	2–0	1982 World Cup qualification
10	17	28 April 1982	Heysel Stadium, Brussels, Belgium	Bulgaria	1–0	2–1	Friendly
11	19	11 June 1982	Estadi del Futbol Club Barcelona, Barcelona, Spain	Argentina	1–0	1–0	1982 World Cup - Group stage
12	24	6 October 1982	Heysel Stadium, Brussels, Belgium	Switzerland	3–0	3–0	Euro 1984 qualification
13	25	15 December 1982	Heysel Stadium, Brussels, Belgium	Scotland	1–1	3–2	Euro 1984 qualification
14	26	30 March 1983	Zentralstadion, Leipzig, East Germany	East Germany	2–0	2–1	Euro 1984 qualification
15	29	6 October 1982	Wankdorfstadion, Bern, Switzerland	Switzerland	1–1	1–3	Euro 1984 qualification
16	31	13 June 1984	Stade Félix Bollaert, Lens, France	Yugoslavia	1–0	2–0	UEFA Euro 1984 - Group stage
17	35	1 May 1985	Heysel Stadium, Brussels, Belgium	Poland	1–0	2–0	1986 World Cup qualification
18	38	23 April 1986	Heysel Stadium, Brussels, Belgium	Bulgaria	2–0	2–0	Friendly
19	40	9 June 1986	Estadio Azteca, Mexico City, Mexico	Mexico	1–2	1–2	1986 World Cup - Group stage
20	48	27 March 1991	Constant Vanden Stock Stadium, Anderlecht, Belgium	Luxembourg	1–0	3–0	Euro 1992 qualification

Key
‡	Indicates goal was scored from a penalty kick

== Honours ==
Anderlecht

- Belgian First Division: 1984–85, 1985–86
- Belgian Super Cup: 1985
- UEFA Cup: 1982–83; runners-up 1983–84
- Jules Pappaert Cup: 1977, 1983, 1985
- Bruges Matins: 1985

Belgium

- UEFA European Championship: runners-up 1980
- FIFA World Cup: fourth place 1986
- Belgian Sports Merit Award: 1980

Individual

- Belgian First Division top scorer: 1979–80 (39 goals), 1980–81 (24 goals), 1981–82 (25 goals), 1982–83 (20 goals), 1985–86 (27 goals), 1990–91 (23 goals)
- European Golden Shoe: 1979–80 (39 goals)
- Ballon d'Or nominations: 1980, 1983
- Belgian Golden Shoe: 1981
- UEFA Cup top scorer: 1982–83 (seven goals)
- UEFA Euro 1984 qualifying: Group 1 top scorer (four goals)
- Best AA Gent-Player of the Season: 1990–91

Sporting positions
Preceded by Bernard Lacombe	FIFA World Cup opening goal 1982	Succeeded by Alessandro Altobelli
