= 1990–91 Belgian First Division =

88th season of top-tier football in Belgium

Belgian First Division
- Season: 1990–91

Statistics of Belgian League in season 1990–91.

== Overview ==
Location of teams in Belgian First Division 1990–91

18 teams participated, and R.S.C. Anderlecht won the championship, while K. Sint-Truidense V.V. and K. Beerschot V.A.C. were relegated.

== League standings ==
Pos	Team	Pld	W	D	L	GF	GA	GD	Pts	Qualification or relegation
1	R.S.C. Anderlecht	34	23	7	4	74	22	+52	53	Qualified for 1991–92 European Cup
2	KV Mechelen	34	20	10	4	59	24	+35	50	Qualified for 1991–92 UEFA Cup
3	K.A.A. Gent	34	20	7	7	67	37	+30	47	Qualified for 1991–92 UEFA Cup
4	Club Brugge K.V.	34	18	11	5	61	27	+34	47	Qualified for 1991–92 European Cup Winners' Cup
5	Germinal Ekeren	34	17	8	9	55	41	+14	42	Qualified for 1991–92 UEFA Cup
6	Standard Liège	34	16	10	8	51	42	+9	42	
7	Royal Antwerp FC	34	11	14	9	54	45	+9	36	
8	R. Charleroi S.C.	34	9	15	10	36	36	0	33	
9	K.S.C. Lokeren Oost-Vlaanderen	34	12	8	14	41	45	−4	32	
10	R.F.C. de Liège	34	11	10	13	42	45	−3	32	
11	Lierse S.K.	34	9	11	14	26	41	−15	29	
12	R.W.D. Molenbeek	34	10	8	16	40	45	−5	28	
13	K.S.V. Waregem	34	8	12	14	33	45	−12	28	
14	K.R.C. Genk	34	9	8	17	31	66	−35	26	
15	K.V. Kortrijk	34	10	5	19	41	57	−16	25	
16	Cercle Brugge K.S.V.	34	9	7	18	40	73	−33	25	
17	K. Sint-Truidense V.V.	34	6	10	18	30	51	−21	22	Relegated to Belgian Second Division
18	K. Beerschot V.A.C.	34	5	5	24	33	72	−39	15	Relegated to Belgian Second Division

== Results ==
Home \ Away	AND	ANT	BEE	CER	CLU	CHA	EKE	GNK	GNT	KOR	RCL	LIE	LOK	MEC	MOL	STV	STA	WAR
Anderlecht		3–0	1–0	0–0	5–1	4–0	4–0	1–1	1–1	3–0	3–1	1–0	0–1	0–0	1–0	1–0	5–1	4–0
Antwerp	1–0		3–0	2–2	0–0	1–1	0–1	6–2	4–1	2–2	2–2	2–0	0–0	0–0	1–1	2–2	4–0	1–0
Beerschot	0–2	1–2		3–2	2–4	0–2	0–1	1–1	2–3	0–4	0–1	3–0	2–0	2–2	1–3	4–0	1–2	1–1
Cercle Brugge	1–3	1–1	3–0		0–1	1–0	3–2	3–1	1–2	2–0	1–1	0–0	3–1	0–2	1–1	0–4	0–0	3–0
Club Brugge	0–2	2–0	3–0	10–0		3–0	2–1	0–1	0–1	1–1	3–1	1–1	1–0	1–1	2–0	2–0	4–1	2–0
Charleroi	1–1	1–1	4–2	1–2	1–1		0–2	2–0	2–2	2–1	2–0	1–1	1–1	5–1	0–0	0–0	2–0	1–0
Germinal Ekeren	3–2	2–2	2–0	6–1	0–3	1–0		2–0	3–1	5–1	2–2	1–0	3–0	0–0	2–0	1–0	2–0	0–0
Genk	0–3	2–0	2–0	3–0	2–1	1–1	1–1		0–3	2–0	1–0	0–0	2–2	1–2	0–0	1–0	0–3	1–1
Gent	1–1	0–1	1–0	3–0	1–1	1–1	2–0	6–1		2–1	1–0	5–1	5–1	2–1	1–2	6–3	1–1	4–0
Kortrijk	1–7	4–1	1–3	3–0	2–2	2–1	0–0	5–0	1–2		2–0	1–2	0–1	0–4	2–0	0–1	0–2	2–0
Liège	4–2	1–1	2–0	4–1	0–2	2–0	1–0	2–1	0–1	2–0		0–0	2–2	0–2	2–0	2–1	4–2	2–2
Lierse	0–4	2–1	3–0	4–0	1–1	2–1	0–2	2–0	0–1	0–1	1–1		0–2	0–4	2–1	0–0	0–0	2–0
Lokeren	0–1	0–3	3–1	2–0	0–1	0–1	2–5	4–2	1–2	0–2	2–0	2–0		0–1	3–0	2–0	2–2	1–1
Mechelen	1–1	2–2	1–0	3–2	1–1	0–0	2–1	6–0	1–0	3–2	2–0	2–0	0–0		4–0	4–0	1–3	1–0
Molenbeek	1–2	2–0	4–1	4–3	0–1	1–1	6–1	2–0	1–5	5–0	2–0	0–0	0–2	0–1		2–2	0–1	0–0
Sint-Truiden	1–2	5–2	1–1	0–1	0–2	0–0	1–1	0–1	0–0	1–0	1–1	2–0	0–2	0–3	0–2		0–1	3–1
Standard Liège	1–2	2–1	7–1	3–2	0–0	2–1	2–2	3–1	2–0	1–0	2–2	0–0	3–1	0–1	1–0	1–1		1–0
Waregem	0–2	1–5	1–1	3–1	2–2	0–0	3–0	4–0	3–0	0–0	1–0	1–2	1–1	1–0	2–0	3–1	1–1	

Legend: Blue = home team win; Yellow = draw; Red = away team win.

== Topscorers ==
Scorer	Goals	Team
(Belgium) Erwin Vandenbergh	23	Gent
(Socialist Federal Republic of Yugoslavia) Josip Weber	20	Cercle Brugge
(Belgium) Luc Nilis	19	Anderlecht
(Brazil) Luís Oliveira	18	Anderlecht
(Belgium) Gunther Hofmans	18	Germinal Ekeren
(Socialist Federal Republic of Yugoslavia) Nebojša Malbaša	15	Liège
(Belgium) Patrick Goots	15	Kortrijk
(Belgium) Jan Ceulemans	14	Club Brugge

== Attendances ==
#	Club	Average
1	Anderlecht	16,971
2	Standard	13,088
3	Club Brugge	12,441
4	Charleroi	10,676
5	Gent	10,371
6	Mechelen	8,553
7	STVV	7,471
8	Genk	7,118
9	Liège	6,529
10	RWDM	5,706
11	Ekeren	5,618
12	Antwerp	5,371
13	Kortrijk	5,088
14	Lokeren	4,882
15	Waregem	4,735
16	Lierse	4,529
17	Cercle	3,765
18	Beerschot	3,353
