= Genc Tomorri =

Albanian football director, coach, and player

Personal information
- Full name: Genc Tomorri
- Date of birth: 17 January 1960 (age 66)
- Place of birth: Tirana, PR Albania
- Position: Defender

Youth career
- –1980: Partizani Tirana

Senior career*
Years	Team	Apps	(Gls)
1980–1990	Partizani		

International career
1981	Albania U-21	1	(0)
1983	Albania	1	(1)

Managerial career
- 2000–2001: Partizani
- 2014: Partizani
- 2014: Partizani Tirana U-19
- * Club domestic league appearances and goals

Genc Tomorri (born 17 January 1960) is an Albanian football director, coach and former player, who has been associated with Partizani Tirana throughout his playing and coaching career.

== International career ==
He made his debut for Albania in a November 1983 European Championship qualification 2–1 loss away against West Germany in which he scored the opening goal and was sent off late in the first half. It proved to remain his sole international game.

== Honours ==
- Albanian Superliga: 2

1981, 1987
