= Ljubomir Radanović =

Yugoslav and Montenegrin footballer

Personal information
- Date of birth: 21 July 1960 (age 66)
- Place of birth: Cetinje, FPR Yugoslavia
- Height: 1.82 m (6 ft 0 in)
- Position: Defender

Senior career*
Years	Team	Apps	(Gls)
1977–1981	Lovćen	36	(1)
1981–1988	Partizan	172	(15)
1988–1990	Standard Liège	62	(3)
1990–1991	Nice	33	(3)
1991–1992	Standard Liège	4	(0)
1992–1995	Bellinzona		
Total		307	(22)

International career
1982–1984	Yugoslavia U21	3	(0)
1984	Yugoslavia Olympic	6	(1)
1983–1988	Yugoslavia	34	(3)
Medal record
Men's Football
Representing Yugoslavia
Olympic Games
Bronze medal – third place	1984 Los Angeles	Team
- * Club domestic league appearances and goals

Ljubomir Radanović (Cyrillic: Љубомир Радановић; born 21 July 1960) is a former Yugoslav and Montenegrin footballer who played as a defender.

== Club career ==
After starting out with Lovćen in the Yugoslav Second League, Radanović moved to Yugoslav First League club Partizan in the 1981–82 season. He spent the following seven years at the Stadion JNA, collecting a total of 172 league appearances and scoring 15 goals. After leaving his homeland, Radanović would go on to play for Standard Liège in Belgium, Nice in France, and Bellinzona in Switzerland.

== International career ==
At international level, Radanović earned 34 caps and scored three goals for Yugoslavia between 1983 and 1988. He is best remembered for scoring a dramatic stoppage-time goal to give his country a decisive 3–2 UEFA Euro 1984 qualifier victory over Bulgaria on 21 December 1983. Additionally, Radanović was a member of the Yugoslav team that won the bronze medal at the 1984 Summer Olympics. His final international was an October 1988 FIFA World Cup qualification match away against Scotland.

== Career statistics ==
National team	Year	Apps	Goals
Yugoslavia	1983	6	1
Yugoslavia	1984	7	1
Yugoslavia	1985	11	0
Yugoslavia	1986	3	0
Yugoslavia	1987	2	1
Yugoslavia	1988	5	0
Total		34	3

Scores and results list Yugoslavia's goal tally first.

No.	Date	Venue	Opponent	Score	Result	Competition
1	21 December 1983	Split, Yugoslavia	Bulgaria	3–2	3–2	UEFA Euro 1984 qualifying
2	31 March 1984	Subotica, Yugoslavia	Hungary	2–0	2–1	Friendly
3	16 December 1987	İzmir, Turkey	Turkey	1–0	3–2	UEFA Euro 1988 qualifying

== Honours ==
Partizan

- Yugoslav First League: 1982–83, 1985–86, 1986–87
