= Muhedin Targaj =

Albanian footballer and manager

Personal information
- Date of birth: 19 March 1955 (age 71)
- Place of birth: Tepelenë, Albania
- Height: 1.83 m (6 ft 0 in)
- Position: Centre-back

Youth career
- 1971–1974: Dinamo Tirana

Senior career*
Years	Team	Apps	(Gls)
1974–1987	Dinamo Tirana		

International career^{‡}
1980–1985	Albania	22	(3)
- * Club domestic league appearances and goals ‡ National team caps and goals as of 26 March 2016

Muhedin Targaj (born 19 March 1955) is a retired Albanian football player and manager. He now works at Albanian Football Association as a member of Executive Committee.

== Club career ==
Born in Tepelenë, Targaj played for Dinamo Tirana from 1973 to 1987, winning five Albanian Superliga championships.

== International career ==
Targaj made 22 appearances for the Albania national football team from 1980 to 1985. He made his international debut on 3 September 1980 against Finland for the qualifying stage of the 1982 FIFA World Cup, playing full-90 minutes in the 2–0 home win. He captained his side for the first time on 27 October 1982 during the 1–0 away lose to Turkey for the UEFA Euro 1984 qualifying.

== Managerial career ==
Following his playing career, Targaj was the Technical Director of Dinamo Tirana from 2001 to 2005. During this time, he was also the coach of the club during the 2001–02 season.

== Career statistics ==
Scores and results list Albania's goal tally first.

#	Date	Venue	Opponent	Score	Result	Competition
1	2 September 1981	Arto Tolsa Areena, Kotka, Finland	Finland	1–0	1–2	1982 FIFA World Cup qualifying
2	30 March 1983	Qemal Stafa Stadium, Tirana, Albania	Germany	1–2	1–2	1982 FIFA World Cup qualifying
3	6 June 1983	Qemal Stafa Stadium, Tirana, Albania	Austria	1–2	1–2	UEFA Euro 1984 qualifying

== Managerial statistics ==
As of 26 March 2016

Team	From	To	Record					
Team	From	To	G	W	D	L	Win %	Ref.
Dinamo Tirana	2001	2002	20	17	3	0	85.00	
Total			20	17	3	0	85.00	

== Honours ==
Dinamo Tirana

- Albanian Superliga (5): 1974–75, 1975–76, 1976–77, 1979–80, 1985–86
- Albanian Cup (3): 1973–74, 1977–78
