= Paweł Król (footballer, born 1960) =

Polish footballer

Personal information
- Full name: Paweł Aleksander Król
- Date of birth: 10 October 1960 (age 66)
- Place of birth: Zawadzkie, PR Poland
- Height: 1.87 m (6 ft 2 in)
- Position: Defender

Senior career*
| Years | Team | Apps | (Gls) |
| 1978–1980 | Odra Opole | 30 | (0) |
| 1980–1989 | Śląsk Wrocław | 233 | (4) |
| 1989–1990 | Fortuna Köln | 4 | (0) |
| 1990 | Śląsk Wrocław | 2 | (0) |
| 1990–1991 | Helsingborg | | |
| 1991–1992 | Jönköpings Södra | | |

International career
| 1981–1988 | Poland | 22 | (3) |
- * Club domestic league appearances and goals

Paweł Aleksander Król (born 10 October 1960) is a Polish former footballer who played as a defender and made 22 appearances for the Poland national team.

== Career ==
Król made his debut for Poland on 27 January 1981 in a friendly match against Japan, which finished as a 4–2 win. He went on to make 22 appearances,scoring 3 goals, before making their last appearance on 24 August 1988 in the 3–2 friendly win against Bulgaria.

== Career statistics ==
=== International ===
Poland
| Year | Apps | Goals |
|---|---|---|
| 1981 | 1 | 0 |
| 1982 | 1 | 1 |
| 1983 | 3 | 0 |
| 1986 | 4 | 0 |
| 1987 | 11 | 2 |
| 1988 | 2 | 0 |
| Total | 22 | 3 |

=== International goals ===
| No. | Date | Venue | Opponent | Score | Result | Competition |
|---|---|---|---|---|---|---|
| 1 | 10 October 1982 | Estádio da Luz, Lisbon, Portugal | Portugal | 1–2 | 1–2 | UEFA Euro 1984 qualifying |
| 2 | 24 March 1987 | Olympic Stadium, Wrocław, Poland | Norway | 2–0 | 4–1 | Friendly |
| 3 | 19 August 1987 | Stadion Zagłębia Lubin, Lubin, Poland | East Germany | 1–0 | 2–0 | Friendly |

== Honours ==
Śląsk Wrocław

- Polish Cup: 1986–87
