= Zvjezdan Cvetković =

Yugoslav footballer

Personal information
- Date of birth: 18 April 1960
- Place of birth: Karlovac, FPR Yugoslavia
- Date of death: 27 February 2017 (aged 56)
- Place of death: Zagreb, Croatia
- Height: 1.85 m (6 ft 1 in)
- Position: Defender

Senior career*
| Years | Team | Apps | (Gls) |
| 1980–1987 | Dinamo Zagreb | 194 | (12) |
| 1987–1990 | Waldhof Mannheim | 65 | (1) |

International career
| 1982–1987 | Yugoslavia | 9 | (1) |

Managerial career
- 2005: Dinamo Zagreb
- 2011: Borac Banja Luka
- * Club domestic league appearances and goals

Zvjezdan Cvetković (18 April 1960 – 27 February 2017) was a Croatian and Yugoslav football manager and player.

== International career ==
He made his debut for Yugoslavia in a November 1982 European Championship qualification match away against Bulgaria, coming on as a 69th-minute substitute for Slavoljub Nikolić, and earned a total of 9 caps, scoring 1 goal. His final international was an August 1987 friendly against the Soviet Union.

== Personal life ==
His younger brother Borislav Cvetković was also Yugoslavia national team player.

=== Death ===
Cvetković was found dead in his garage in Kostanjevec, Maksimir, Zagreb, in February 2017. According to unofficial information, he died of natural causes.
