= Ludo Coeck =

Belgian footballer (1955–1985)

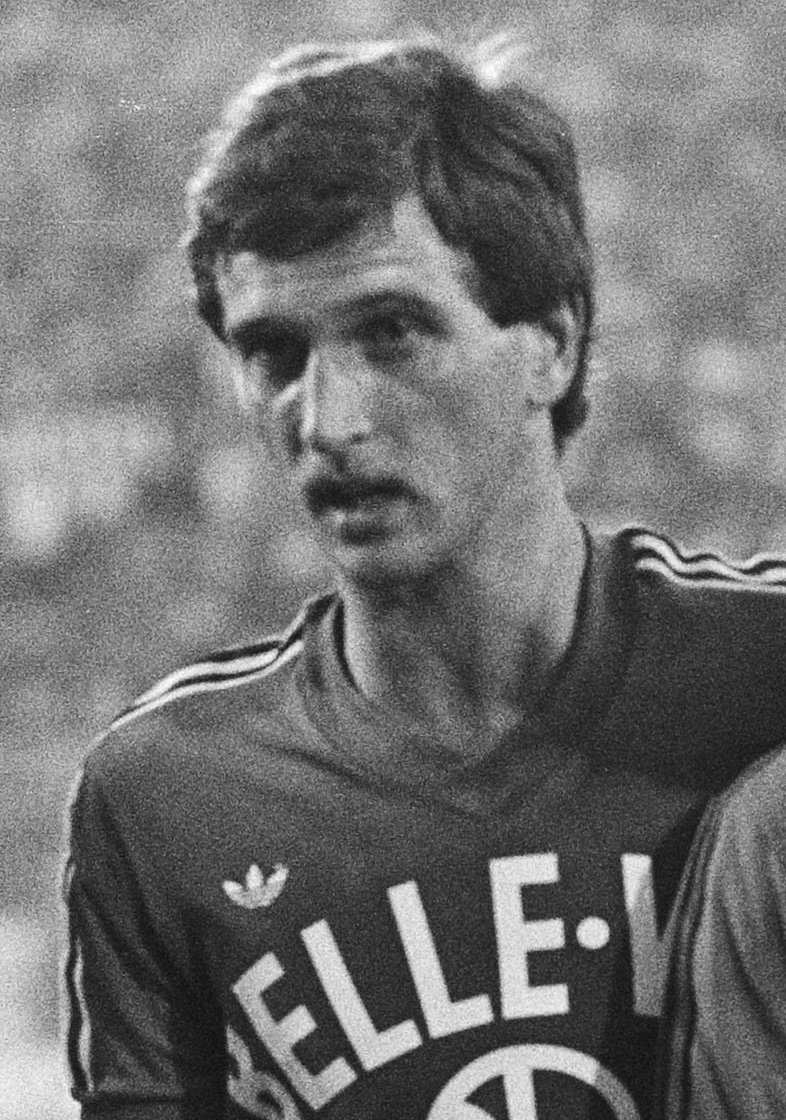
- Coeck with Anderlecht in 1978

Personal information
- Date of birth: 25 September 1955
- Place of birth: Berchem, Belgium
- Date of death: 9 October 1985 (aged 30)
- Place of death: Edegem, Belgium
- Height: 1.84 m (6 ft 0 in)
- Position: Midfielder

Senior career*
Years	Team	Apps	(Gls)
1971–1972	Berchem Sport	7	(7)
1972–1983	R.S.C. Anderlecht	292	(54)
1983–1984	Inter Milan	9	(0)
1984–1985	→ Ascoli Calcio (loan)	0	(0)
Total		308	(61)

International career
1974–1984	Belgium	46	(4)
- * Club domestic league appearances and goals

Ludo Coeck (25 September 1955 – 9 October 1985) was a Belgian footballer who played as left winger or central midfielder. His clubs included Berchem Sport, Anderlecht, Inter Milan and Ascoli Calcio.

First capped for the Belgium national team at the age of 19, he went on to play for his country 46 times, scoring four goals, over an international career which lasted a decade.

Coeck was a member of the Belgium World Cup squad at España 82, where he played in all five of his country's games and scored with a long-range shot against El Salvador, and at Euro 84, where he appeared as a substitute in the defeats by France and Denmark.

On 7 October 1985, while he was on his way back to Antwerp and taking part in a TV sports programme in Brussels, Coeck was badly injured when his BMW ploughed into crash barriers on a motorway near the town of Rumst. He died two days later, at the University of Antwerp Clinic in Edegem. He was 30 years old.

== Early life ==
Ludo Coeck was born in Berchem, Antwerp. At the age of 9, he joined the local Berchem Sport. As a child, he looked up to Italian playmaker Gianni Rivera.

== Club career ==
=== K. Berchem Sport ===
Ludo Coeck made his professional debut at age 16 with K. Berchem Sport, who would go on to win the Second Division in the title. Coeck immediately made an excellent impression in a handful of matches, after which several top clubs from Belgium showed interest. His father hoped, just like the supporters of Berchem Sport, that Coeck would stay in Berchem for a while because of his young age. But the offer of Constant Vanden Stock was so tempting that the club let Coeck leave for R.S.C. Anderlecht in the summer of 1972, who paid more than 5 million BEF for the young player. The Brussels club saw Coeck as a possible successor to Paul Van Himst.

=== Anderlecht ===
The 17-year-old Coeck joined an Anderlecht squad consisting of top players like François Van der Elst, Rob Rensenbrink, Paul Van Himst, Hugo Broos and Gilbert Van Binst, debuting in the a match against Standard Liège in November. His first goal for the club would be against Sint-Truiden in December. Under the leadership of Urbain Braems, Coeck would prove crucial in winning the 1973–74 Belgian First Division title. Raymond Goethals, who discovered Coeck at 15, described him as a perfect player who proved his worth at a young age in a top class Anderlecht team.

With Coeck forming a midfield with Dutchman Arie Haan, Anderlecht would enjoy tremendous success in Europe, winning two European Cup Winners' Cups against West Ham United (1976) and Austria Wien (1978) and two European Super Cups against European powerhouses Bayern Munich (1976) and Liverpool (1978).

An injury in the 1976 final against West Ham after a tackle by Trevor Brooking would be the first of many for Coeck, with the player regularly missing matches. In 1979, Coeck suffered a grave injury in the knee that pundits predicted would end his career, but he recovered and returned to the Anderlecht squad after nine months. Coeck would suffer another injury in 1981 in a European Cup match against Widzew Łódź, only to recover months later. During this time, 1. FC Köln and KAA Gent were interested in his services.

When Tomislav Ivić became coach of Anderlecht in 1980, Coeck was put in the role of sweeper, only to return to his preferred midfield position when Anderlecht legend Paul Van Himst took over as club coach in 1982. Forming a midfield with Spaniard Juan Lozano, Coeck would help Anderlecht win their first UEFA Cup title in 1983 against Benfica.

=== Italy ===
Weeks after winning the UEFA Cup with Anderlecht, Coeck joined Inter Milan, but constant injuries reduced Coeck's playing chances at the club. His chances at Inter were completely dashed when, during a qualifying international for the European Championship in France with the Red Devils against Switzerland, he was again kicked on the ankle and bone fragments had to be removed. "The ankle never felt good after that", Coeck explained. The Milan club loaned Coeck to Ascoli, only to never play a match for them.

== International career ==
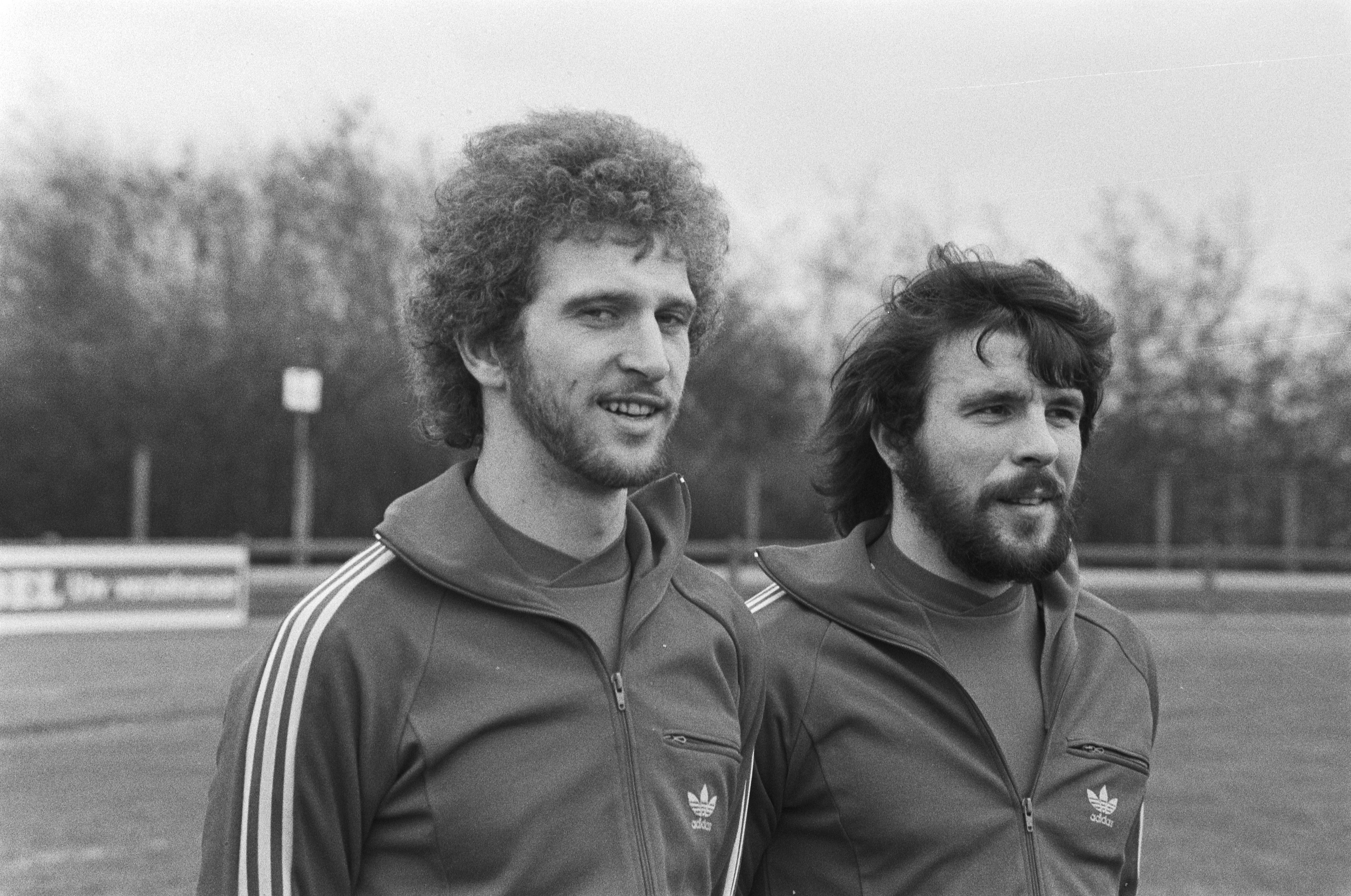
Coeck and Eric Gerets during training for Belgium in 1980

Coeck made his debut for the Belgian national team on 8 September 1974. In 1982, Belgium qualified for the World Cup in Spain under national coach Guy Thys. Coeck's participation was doubtful due to his injury. But he recovered in time and was allowed to travel to Spain in the summer of 1982. Belgium played its opening match at Camp Nou against reigning world champions Argentina, with Belgium winning by 1–0. Belgian Goalkeeper Jean-Marie Pfaff praised Coeck's contribution afterwards: "He stopped Maradona like a hero and ran everywhere on the pitch." In the next match against El Salvador, Coeck scored the only goal of the game with a powerful long distance shot. His last match with the Belgian national team would be in the final group match of Euro 1984 against Denmark, which Belgium lost by 3–2.

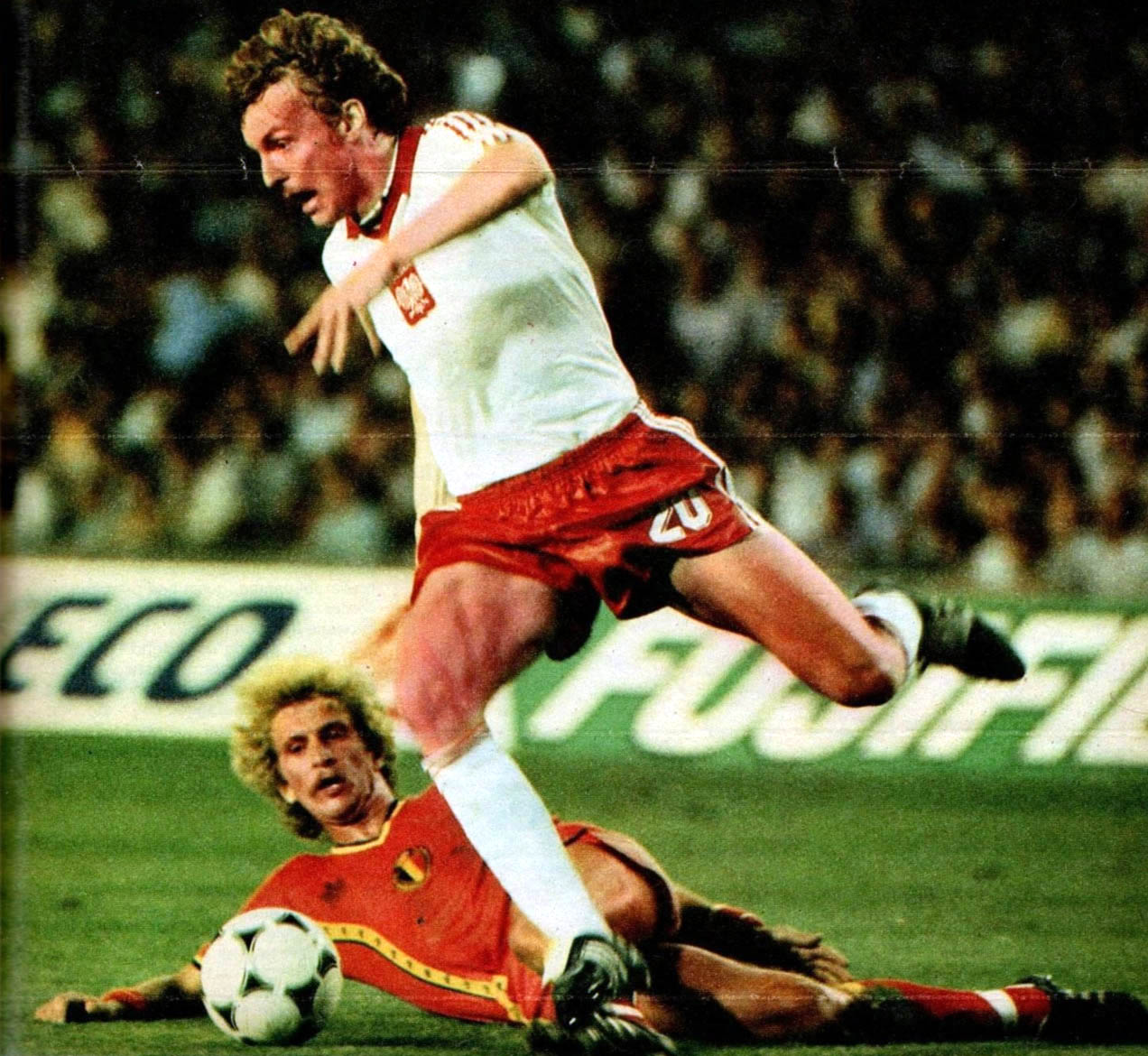
Duel between Coeck and Zbigniew Boniek during the 1982 World Cup

== Style of play ==
Considered one of Belgium's finest talents, the flamboyant Coeck was a midfielder with great technique and passing abilities, and also possessed a powerful shot with either foot. Coeck stood out for his long passes and left-footed shots, which could propel the ball across the field at speeds of up to 118.7 kilometres per hour. As an Anderlecht crowd favourite (“Cuckoo, cuckoo!”) he was unparalleled due to his ball control. Coeck's career was often marked by injuries.

== Death ==
In October 1985, on a rain-soaked evening, Coeck lost control of the steering wheel due to aquaplanning in a bend on the Antwerp-Brussels motorway, near the town of Rumst. Coeck, who had just turned thirty, was in a coma for two days, but a ruptured liver and a cerebral hemorrhage ultimately proved fatal on 9 October in the Academic Hospital in Edegem.

== Career statistics ==
Appearances and goals by club, season and competition
Club	Season	League			National cup (Note: Includes Belgian Cup, Coppa Italia)		Europe		Other		Total	
Club	Season	Division	Apps	Goals	Apps	Goals	Apps	Goals	Apps	Goals	Apps	Goals
Berchem Sport	1971–72	Second Division	7	7	—		—		—		7	7
Berchem Sport	Total		7	7	0	0	0	0	0	0	7	7
Anderlecht	1972–73	First Division	18	3	3	1	—		—		21	4
Anderlecht	1973–74	First Division	27	4	4	1	2 (Note: Appearances in UEFA Cup Winners' Cup)	0	2 (Note: Appearances in Belgian League Cup)	0	37	5
Anderlecht	1974–75	First Division	37	5	6	1	6 (Note: Appearances in European Champion Clubs' Cup)	2	2	0	53	8
Anderlecht	1975–76	First Division	32	7	1	0	9 (Note: Appearances in UEFA Cup Winners' Cup)	1	—		42	8
Anderlecht	1976–77	First Division	32	9	4	1	9 (Note: Appearances in UEFA Cup Winners' Cup)	2	2 (Note: Appearances in UEFA Super Cup)	0	47	12
Anderlecht	1977–78	First Division	28	6	3	1	7 (Note: Appearances in UEFA Cup Winners' Cup)	1	—		38	8
Anderlecht	1978–79	First Division	28	5	4	1	2 (Note: Appearances in UEFA Cup Winners' Cup)	1	2	0	36	7
Anderlecht	1979–80	First Division	10	1	2	0	2	0	—		12	1
Anderlecht	1980–81	First Division	33	3	2	0	2 (Note: Appearances in UEFA Cup)	0	—		37	3
Anderlecht	1981–82	First Division	19	2	1	1	5	0	—		25	3
Anderlecht	1982–83	First Division	30	9	—		12	3	—		42	12
Anderlecht	Total		294	54	30	7	54	10	8	0	390	71
Inter Milan	1983–84	Serie A	9	0	4	0	2	0	—		15	0
Inter Milan	Total		9	0	4	0	2	0	0	0	15	0
Ascoli (loan)	1984–85	Serie A	—		—		—		—		—	
Ascoli (loan)	Total		0	0	0	0	0	0	0	0	0	0
Career total			310	61	34	7	56	10	8	0	408	78

Appearances and goals by national team and year
National team	Year	Apps	Goals
Belgium	1974	1	0
Belgium	1975	4	0
Belgium	1976	3	0
Belgium	1977	5	0
Belgium	1978	5	0
Belgium	1979	0	0
Belgium	1980	5	1
Belgium	1981	3	0
Belgium	1982	11	2
Belgium	1983	6	1
Belgium	1984	3	0
Total		46	4

Scores and results list Belgium's goal tally first.

#	Date	Venue	Opponent	Score	Result	Competition
1.	2 April 1980	Heysel Stadium, Brussels	Poland	1–0	2–1	Friendly
2.	19 June 1982	Nuevo Estadio, Elche	El Salvador	1–0	1–0	1982 World Cup - Group stage
3.	6 October 1982	Heysel Stadium, Brussels	Switzerland	2–0	3–0	Euro 1984 qualifier
4.	27 April 1983	Heysel Stadium, Brussels	East Germany	2–1	2–1	Euro 1984 qualifier

== Honours ==
=== Player ===
RSC Anderlecht

- Belgian First Division: 1973–74, 1980–81
- Belgian Cup: 1972–73, 1974–75, 1975–76
- Belgian League Cup: 1973, 1974
- European Cup Winners' Cup: 1975–76 (winners), 1976–77 (runners-up), 1977–78 (winners)
- European Super Cup: 1976, 1978
- UEFA Cup: 1982–83 (winners)
- Amsterdam Tournament: 1976
- Tournoi de Paris: 1977
- Jules Pappaert Cup: 1977, 1983
- Belgian Sports Merit Award: 1978

=== Individual ===
- Belgian Golden Shoe of the 20th Century (1995): 10th place
- DH The Best RSC Anderlecht Team Ever: 2020
- Ludo Coeck stadium (nl) in Berchem
