= Hasan Şengün =

Turkish footballer (born 1961)

Personal information
- Date of birth: 14 July 1961 (age 65)
- Place of birth: Trabzon, Turkey
- Height: 1.74 m (5 ft 9 in)
- Position: Forward

Senior career*
Years	Team	Apps	(Gls)
1979–1983	Samsunspor		
1983–1990	Trabzonspor		
1990–1991	Malatyaspor		
1991–1993	Samsunspor		
1992–1993	→ Bafraspor (loan)		

International career
1982–1985	Turkey	16	(2)

Managerial career
- 2006: Samsunspor
- * Club domestic league appearances and goals

Hasan Şengün (born 14 July 1961) is a Turkish football player and manager who played as a forward.
