= Nikolay Larionov =

Russian footballer

Personal information
- Full name: Nikolay Yevgeniyevich Larionov
- Date of birth: 19 January 1957 (age 69)
- Place of birth: Volkhov, Russian SFSR
- Height: 1.74 m (5 ft 9 in)
- Positions: Defender; midfielder

Team information
- Current team: FC Zenit St. Petersburg (reserves asst coach)

Senior career*
Years	Team	Apps	(Gls)
1975–1976	Zenit Leningrad	6	(0)
1976–1978	Dynamo Leningrad	?	(?)
1979–1989	Zenit Leningrad	266	(14)
1990	Kiruna FF	19	(1)
1991	Zenit Saint Petersburg	25	(1)
1992	GBK Kokkola	19	(5)
1992	FC Sepsi-78 (Finland)	4	(1)
1993	Hovsala BK (Finland)	14	(2)

International career
1983–1986	USSR	19	(2)

Managerial career
- 2002: FC Zenit St. Petersburg (reserves assistant)
- 2003–2004: FC Zenit St. Petersburg (assistant)
- 2005–2006: FC Zenit St. Petersburg (director)
- 2008–: FC Zenit St. Petersburg (reserves assistant)
- * Club domestic league appearances and goals

Nikolay Yevgeniyevich Larionov (Russian: Николай Евгеньевич Ларионов; born 19 January 1957, in Volkhov) is a Russian former football player and current manager. As of 2009, he is an assistant coach with the reserves team of FC Zenit St. Petersburg.

== Honours ==
- Soviet Top League winner: 1984.

== International career ==
Larionov made his debut for USSR on 23 March 1983 in a friendly against France. He scored 2 goals for the national team, including a goal against Portugal in a UEFA Euro 1984 qualifier. He participated in the 1986 FIFA World Cup.
