= Ronald Kreer =

German footballer

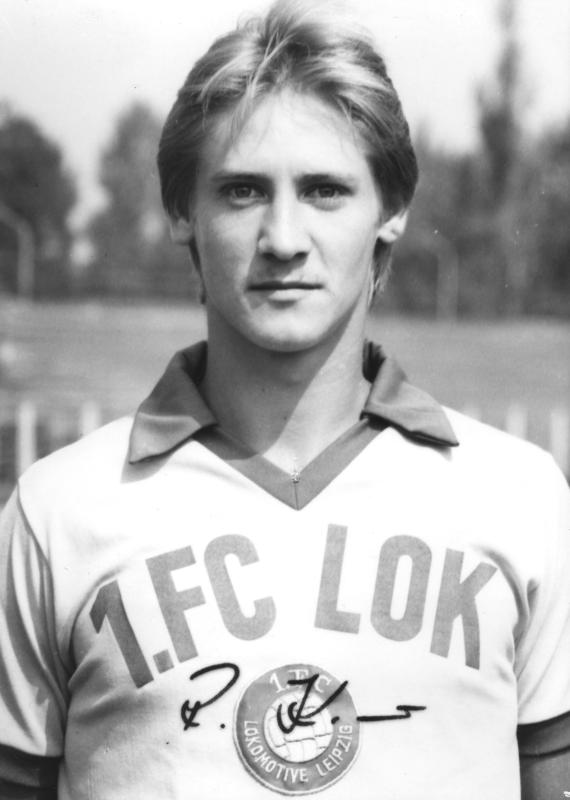

Personal information
- Date of birth: 10 November 1959 (age 66)
- Place of birth: Leipzig, East Germany
- Height: 1.75 m (5 ft 9 in)
- Position: Defender

Youth career
- 1968–1970: BSG Lokomotive Delitzsch
- 1971–1978: 1. FC Lokomotive Leipzig

Senior career*
Years	Team	Apps	(Gls)
1979–1991	1. FC Lokomotive Leipzig	244	(10)
1991–1992	VfB Leipzig	3	(0)
1992–1995	FC Sachsen Leipzig	?	(?)
2005	1. FC Lokomotive Leipzig	1	

International career
?–?	East Germany Junior team	16	
?–?	East Germany Youth team	12	(1)
?–1984	East Germany Olympic team	13	(1)
1982–1989	East Germany	65	(2)
Medal record
Representing East Germany
UEFA European Under-21 Championship
Silver medal – second place	1980	Team competition
Lokomotive Leipzig
Runner-up	DDR-Oberliga	1986
Runner-up	DDR-Oberliga	1988
Winner	FDGB-Pokal	1981
Winner	FDGB-Pokal	1986
Winner	FDGB-Pokal	1987
Runner-up	UEFA Cup Winners' Cup	1987
- * Club domestic league appearances and goals

Ronald Kreer (born 10 November 1959) is a German former professional footballer.

== Biography ==
Kreer began his career playing for the youth side of BSG Lokomotive Delitzsch, the local club of the town where he grew up, under the trainer Klaus Rudolph in 1968, played there for three years and then of 1. FC Lokomotive Leipzig in 1970. After having developed in the club's youth side successfully, he was promoted to the Lok's senior squad in 1979. Kreer played 244 games in the DDR-Oberliga for the club, scoring 10 goals, he holds the all-time record for the most Oberliga appearances in the history of 1. FC Lokomotive Leipzig. He debuted to the senior squad as the substitute for Matthias Liebers at 67 minutes of the match of the FDGB-Pokal 1978 2nd round against Motor Babelsberg under the trainer Heinz Joerk, on 14 October 1978. Lok won it with 2–0 and proceeded to the next round. His first appearance for DDR-Oberliga is at the match between Lok and Chemie Böhlen on 21 October 1978, as the 18th in Lok's line-up. He scored at 22 minutes of the match, Lok lead with 1–0 and won with 2–1. With Lok he won the FDGB Pokal three times 1981, 1986 and 1987. 1986 1. FC Lokomotive Leipzig 5–1 FC Union Berlin 31 May 1986 and 1987 1. FC Lokomotive Leipzig 4–1 FC Hansa Rostock 13 June 1987. And he became the runner-up twice in DDR-Oberliga, both were competed with Berliner FC Dynamo. 1986: Berliner FC Dynamo 34:18, 1. FC Lokomotive Leipzig 32:20. 1988: decided on goal difference: Berliner FC Dynamo 58:30, 1. FC Lokomotive Leipzig 39:20. There was "a trio that provides a defense guarantee for 1. FC Lok" of three national players then; René Müller, Uwe Zötzsche and Ronald Kreer.

Kreer took to the field in 27 European matches with 1. FC Lokomotive Leipzig. His largest win is the 7–0 over Lillestrøm Sportsklubb at the first leg of the first round of the UEFA Cup 1984/85 in Bruno-Plache-Stadion on 19 September 1984. His highest achievement is the 1987 European Cup Winners' Cup Final in Athens on 13 May 1987 against Johan Cruyff's Ajax. At the second leg of the semi-final on 22 April 1987, 1. FC Lokomotive Leipzig defeated FC Girondins de Bordeaux on the legendary dramatic penalty shootout, proceeded to the final for the first time in the club history. Kreer, who kept fighting though with his nasal bone fractured from the early minutes of the match, jubilated and celebrated their victory running with the teammates under the flood of the over-fulfilled fans' roaring in Leipzig's Zentralstadion. Ajax won the final with 1–0, Lok received the runner-up medal.

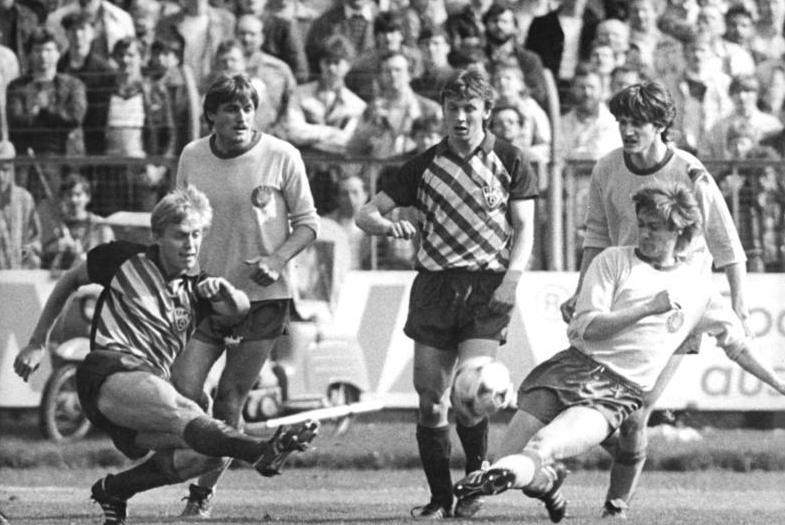
Bundesarchiv Bild 183-1987-0411-021, 1. FC Lok Leipzig - BFC Dynamo 1-3

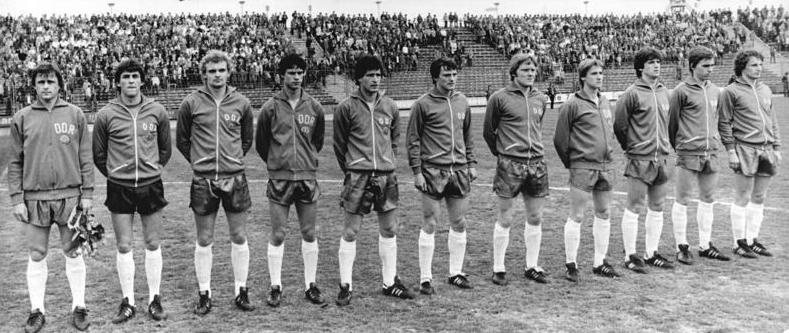
Bundesarchiv Bild 183-W0606-0338, Rostock, DDR-Nachwuchs wurde Vize-Europameister

Kreer played for the East Germany Youth team at the 1980 Under-21 European Championships, and was sent off (61. "uncontrollable reaction" to Gassajew) as the team were beaten 1–0 by the USSR in the second final in Moskva. Kreer played for the East Germany Olympic team and the squad finished as the top of the group B, qualified to the 1984 Summer Olympics. The result: East Germany 14:5 13:3 Poland 13:6 13:3. Their last qualifying match was on 18 April 1984 4–0 against Denmark. Their long journey began in the season 1982/83, playing two matches with the club teams and 21 matches with the national teams. 44 players in total were called up to the latter 21, Kreer played 6 of 8 qualifying matches, 13 matches and scored one goal in total. On 10 May 1984, the National Olympic Committee of the German Democratic Republic announced that they would join the 1984 Summer Olympics boycott.

He made his full international debut for East Germany on 22 September 1982 in a 2–2 draw against Bulgaria in Burgas. Kreer played a total of 65 times for East Germany (making him the 10th most-capped player). He also scored two goals in his international career, which ended in 1989. The second of the two goals was the decisive direct 25-metre shot for their sixth qualifying match of 1986 FIFA World Cup against France on 11 September 1985. Legend Joël Bats was powerless, East Germany led 2–0 at 81 minutes of the match and won over the European champions. "Jubilee game and concentrated performance harmonized", said the co-trainer Harald Irmscher about Kreer's performance. His last appearance is their last qualifying match of the 1990 FIFA World Cup against Austria in Wien Praterstadion on 15 November 1989, wearing the captain armband. There was possibility left to qualify, the tables at that time: USSR 9:4 9:5, Turkey 12:8 7:7, East Germany 9:10 7:7, Austria 6:9 7:7, Iceland (8 matches completed) 6:11 6:10. On 9 November 1989 the Berlin Wall opened, the team hotel in Wien got surrounded by agencies like Reiner Calmund, hunting young talent at a low cost. Kreer was sent-off at 75 minutes of the match for the attempted action after headbutt of Andreas Ogris, left the pitch and the team with 3–0 behind. Austria won and qualified. "A referee. unfortunately no referee and certainly not an impartial!". An editor of FUWO shouted in the match info box.

Kreer played as a defensive midfielder, a man-marker usually aiming to kill the striker and a right full-back.

In 1991–92, Kreer played a season in the 2. Fußball-Bundesliga with the club, before ending his career with local rival FC Sachsen Leipzig in the third tier.

In 2016, Kreer was selected as the right full-back of the Lok's Legend-Elleven by online-voting from the large-number fans.

After ending his playing career, he worked with the German Football Association training young talent around Leipzig, then has been working as Volkswagen dealer.

He lives in Torgau and occasionally plays for the DDR tradition's team and for Lok oldies.
