= Czechoslovak Football Association =

Governing body of association football in Czechoslovakia

UEFA
- Founded: 10 April 1921; 105 years ago
- Folded: 1993
- Headquarters: Prague
- FIFA affiliation: 1923
- UEFA affiliation: 1954

The Czechoslovak Football Federation (Czech: Československý svaz fotbalový, Slovak: Československý zväz futbalový) was the former national football federation of Czechoslovakia.

== History ==
Founded in 1922, it succeeded the Bohemian football federation (Czech: Český Svaz Footballový) which had been founded in 1901 when Bohemia and Moravia were still part of the Austro-Hungarian Empire. The Czechoslovak football federation underwent a number of structural reorganisations and designations during its existence, being named at different periods as Československý Svaz Footballový, Československá Associace Fotballová, Československý Fotbalový Svaz, and finally as Československá Fotbalová Asociace. A founding member of UEFA in 1954, it managed football competitions on Czechoslovak territory as well as the Czechoslovakia national football team. After the partition of Czechoslovakia into two independent states in 1993, the Czechoslovak federation was dissolved at the end of the World Cup qualifiers. It gave way to the Football Association of the Czech Republic, which inherited its seat as a member of FIFA and UEFA in 1994, and to the Slovak Football Association.
