= UEFA Euro 1976 qualifying Group 1 =

Football tournament

Group 1 of the UEFA Euro 1976 qualifying tournament was one of the eight groups to decide which teams would qualify for the UEFA Euro 1976 finals tournament. Group 1 consisted of four teams: Czechoslovakia, England, Portugal, and Cyprus, where they played against each other home-and-away in a round-robin format. The group winners were Czechoslovakia, who finished one point above England.

== Final table ==
| Pos | Team | Pld | W | D | L | GF | GA | GD | Pts | Qualification | (Czechoslovakia) | (England) | (Portugal) | (Cyprus) |
|---|---|---|---|---|---|---|---|---|---|---|---|---|---|---|
| 1 | Czechoslovakia | 6 | 4 | 1 | 1 | 15 | 5 | +10 | 9 | Advance to quarter-finals | — | 2–1 | 5–0 | 4–0 |
| 2 | England | 6 | 3 | 2 | 1 | 11 | 3 | +8 | 8 | | 3–0 | — | 0–0 | 5–0 |
| 3 | Portugal | 6 | 2 | 3 | 1 | 5 | 7 | −2 | 7 | | 1–1 | 1–1 | — | 1–0 |
| 4 | Cyprus | 6 | 0 | 0 | 6 | 0 | 16 | −16 | 0 | | 0–3 | 0–1 | 0–2 | — |

Source: UEFA
Rules for classification: Qualification tiebreakers

== Matches ==
30 October 1974
19:45

| England | 3–0 | Czechoslovakia |
|---|---|---|
| Channon 72'; Bell 80', 83' | Report |

Wembley Stadium, London
Attendance: 83,858
Referee: Michel Kitabdjian (France)

20 November 1974
19:45

| England | 0–0 | Portugal |
|---|---|---|
| | Report |

Wembley Stadium, London
Attendance: 84,461
Referee: Anton Bucheli (Switzerland)

16 April 1975
19:45

| England | 5–0 | Cyprus |
|---|---|---|
| Macdonald 2', 35', 48', 53', 86' | Report |

Wembley Stadium, London
Attendance: 68,245
Referee: Martti Hirviniemi (Finland)

20 April 1975
17:00

| Czechoslovakia | 4–0 | Cyprus |
|---|---|---|
| Panenka 10', 35', 50' (pen.); Masný 78' | Report |

Letenský Stadion, Prague
Attendance: 4,994
Referee: Heinz Einbeck (East Germany)

30 April 1975
17:00

| Czechoslovakia | 5–0 | Portugal |
|---|---|---|
| Bičovský 11', 22'; Nehoda 25', 46'; Petráš 52' | Report |

Letenský Stadion, Prague
Attendance: 12,034 *
Referee: Ferdinand Biwersi (West Germany)

Note: Attendance also reported as 22,000.

11 May 1975
16:45

| Cyprus | 0–1 | England |
|---|---|---|
| | Report | Keegan 6' |

Tsirion Stadium, Limassol
Attendance: 15,708
Referee: Tsvetan Stanev (Bulgaria)

8 June 1975
16:45

| Cyprus | 0–2 | Portugal |
|---|---|---|
| | Report | Nené 25'; Moínhos 87' |

Tsirion Stadium, Limassol
Attendance: 8,615
Referee: Gheorghe Limona (Romania)

30 October 1975
14:00

| Czechoslovakia | 2–1 | England |
|---|---|---|
| Nehoda 45'; Galis 47' | Report | Channon 26' |

Tehelné pole, Bratislava
Attendance: 50,651
Referee: Alberto Michelotti (Italy)

Note: The match was originally abandoned after 17 minutes on 29 October 1975 due to fog. The score at that moment was 0–0.

12 November 1975
21:30

| Portugal | 1–1 | Czechoslovakia |
|---|---|---|
| Nené 8' | Report | Ondruš 7' |

Estádio das Antas, Porto
Attendance: 21,978
Referee: Charles Corver (Netherlands)

19 November 1975
21:00

| Portugal | 1–1 | England |
|---|---|---|
| Rui Rodrigues 16' | Report | Channon 42' |

Estádio José Alvalade, Lisbon
Attendance: 13,912
Referee: Erich Linemayr (Austria)

23 November 1975
14:45

| Cyprus | 0–3 | Czechoslovakia |
|---|---|---|
| | Report | Nehoda 9'; Bičovský 27'; Masný 33' |

Tsirion Stadium, Limassol
Attendance: 8,636
Referee: Sándor Petri (Hungary)

3 December 1975
21:00

| Portugal | 1–0 | Cyprus |
|---|---|---|
| Alves 20' | Report |

Estádio do Bonfim, Setúbal
Attendance: 4,994
Referee: Richard Casha (Malta)

== Goalscorers ==
There were 267 goals scored in 96 matches, for an average of 2.78 goals per match.

8 goals

- (Republic of Ireland) Don Givens

6 goals

- (Hungary) Tibor Nyilasi

5 goals

- (Austria) Hans Krankl
- (England) Malcolm Macdonald

4 goals

- (Czechoslovakia) Zdeněk Nehoda
- (Netherlands) Johan Cruyff
- (Romania) Zoltan Crișan
- (Romania) Dudu Georgescu
- (Wales) Arfon Griffiths
- (West Germany) Jupp Heynckes

3 goals

- (Bulgaria) Georgi Denev
- (Czechoslovakia) Přemysl Bičovský
- (Czechoslovakia) Antonín Panenka
- (England) Mick Channon
- (France) Jean-Marc Guillou
- (Greece) Antonis Antoniadis
- (Luxembourg) Gilbert Dussier
- (Netherlands) Willy van der Kuijlen
- (Norway) Tom Lund
- (Poland) Grzegorz Lato
- (Poland) Andrzej Szarmach
- (Soviet Union) Viktor Kolotov
- (Wales) John Toshack
- (Socialist Federal Republic of Yugoslavia) Josip Katalinski

2 goals

- (Austria) Kurt Welzl
- (Bulgaria) Hristo Bonev
- (Bulgaria) Bozhil Kolev
- (Bulgaria) Pavel Panov
- (Czechoslovakia) Marián Masný
- (England) Colin Bell
- (Finland) Timo Rahja
- (Greece) Georgios Delikaris
- (Greece) Mimis Papaioannou
- (Hungary) László Nagy
- (Luxembourg) Nico Braun
- (Luxembourg) Paul Philipp
- (Netherlands) Johan Neeskens
- (Northern Ireland) Bryan Hamilton
- (Poland) Robert Gadocha
- (Portugal) Nené
- (Scotland) Bruce Rioch
- (Soviet Union) Oleg Blokhin
- (Soviet Union) Volodymyr Onyshchenko
- (Spain) Quini
- (Sweden) Thomas Nordahl
- (Sweden) Thomas Sjöberg
- (Wales) Leighton James
- (West Germany) Erich Beer
- (West Germany) Bernhard Cullmann
- (West Germany) Ronald Worm
- (Socialist Federal Republic of Yugoslavia) Branko Oblak

1 goal

- (Austria) Kurt Jara
- (Austria) Helmut Köglberger
- (Austria) Wilhelm Kreuz
- (Austria) Herbert Prohaska
- (Belgium) Raoul Lambert
- (Belgium) Maurice Martens
- (Belgium) Wilfried Puis
- (Belgium) Jacques Teugels
- (Belgium) François Van der Elst
- (Belgium) Wilfried Van Moer
- (Bulgaria) Borislav Dimitrov
- (Bulgaria) Kiril Milanov
- (Bulgaria) Yordan Yordanov
- (Czechoslovakia) Dušan Galis
- (Czechoslovakia) Anton Ondruš
- (Czechoslovakia) Ladislav Petráš
- (Denmark) Lars Bastrup
- (Denmark) Peter Dahl
- (Denmark) Kristen Nygaard
- (East Germany) Peter Ducke
- (East Germany) Reinhard Häfner
- (East Germany) Martin Hoffmann
- (East Germany) Hans-Jürgen Kreische
- (East Germany) Jürgen Pommerenke
- (East Germany) Jürgen Sparwasser
- (East Germany) Joachim Streich
- (East Germany) Eberhard Vogel
- (England) Kevin Keegan
- (Finland) Matti Paatelainen
- (France) Dominique Bathenay
- (France) Marc Berdoll
- (France) Christian Coste
- (France) Jean Gallice
- (Greece) Kostas Eleftherakis
- (Greece) Lakis Glezos
- (Greece) Konstantinos Iosifidis
- (Greece) Thomas Mavros
- (Greece) Stavros Sarafis
- (Hungary) László Bálint
- (Hungary) László Branikovits
- (Hungary) József Horváth
- (Hungary) Sándor Pintér
- (Hungary) László Pusztai
- (Hungary) Béla Várady
- (Hungary) Tibor Wollek
- (Iceland) Jóhannes Eðvaldsson
- (Iceland) Matthías Hallgrímsson
- (Iceland) Ásgeir Sigurvinsson
- (Italy) Roberto Boninsegna
- (Italy) Fabio Capello
- (Italy) Giorgio Chinaglia
- (Malta) Richard Aquilina
- (Malta) Vincent Magro
- (Netherlands) Ruud Geels
- (Netherlands) Harry Lubse
- (Netherlands) Rob Rensenbrink
- (Netherlands) Frans Thijssen
- (Netherlands) René van de Kerkhof
- (Northern Ireland) Tommy Finney
- (Northern Ireland) Allan Hunter
- (Northern Ireland) Sammy McIlroy
- (Northern Ireland) Sammy Morgan
- (Northern Ireland) Chris Nicholl
- (Northern Ireland) Martin O'Neill
- (Norway) Erik Just Olsen
- (Norway) Stein Thunberg
- (Poland) Henryk Kasperczak
- (Portugal) João Resende Alves
- (Portugal) Mário Moinhos
- (Portugal) Rui Rodrigues
- (Republic of Ireland) Eoin Hand
- (Republic of Ireland) Mick Martin
- (Republic of Ireland) Ray Treacy
- (Romania) Cornel Dinu
- (Romania) Anghel Iordănescu
- (Romania) Mircea Lucescu
- (Scotland) Billy Bremner
- (Scotland) Kenny Dalglish
- (Scotland) Joe Harper
- (Scotland) Joe Jordan
- (Scotland) Ted MacDougall
- (Scotland) Gordon McQueen
- (Soviet Union) Anatoliy Konkov
- (Soviet Union) Vladimir Muntyan
- (Soviet Union) Volodymyr Veremeyev
- (Spain) José Luis Capón
- (Spain) José Claramunt
- (Spain) Roberto Juan Martínez
- (Spain) Alfredo Megido
- (Spain) Pirri
- (Spain) Santillana
- (Spain) Manuel Velázquez
- (Spain) Ángel María Villar
- (Sweden) Ralf Edström
- (Sweden) Ove Grahn
- (Sweden) Roland Sandberg
- (Sweden) Conny Torstensson
- (Switzerland) Rudolf Elsener
- (Switzerland) Kurt Müller
- (Switzerland) Peter Risi
- (Switzerland) Hanspeter Schild
- (Turkey) İsmail Arca
- (Turkey) Alpaslan Eratlı
- (Turkey) Mehmet Oğuz
- (Wales) Mike England
- (Wales) John Mahoney
- (Wales) Gil Reece
- (Wales) Phil Roberts
- (Wales) Terry Yorath
- (West Germany) Bernd Hölzenbein
- (West Germany) Manfred Ritschel
- (West Germany) Berti Vogts
- (West Germany) Herbert Wimmer
- (Socialist Federal Republic of Yugoslavia) Vladislav Bogićević
- (Socialist Federal Republic of Yugoslavia) Ivan Buljan
- (Socialist Federal Republic of Yugoslavia) Zvonko Ivezić
- (Socialist Federal Republic of Yugoslavia) Ivica Šurjak
- (Socialist Federal Republic of Yugoslavia) Drago Vabec
- (Socialist Federal Republic of Yugoslavia) Franjo Vladić
- (Socialist Federal Republic of Yugoslavia) Momčilo Vukotić

1 own goal

- (Republic of Ireland) Tony Dunne (against Turkey)
- (Soviet Union) Stefan Reshko (against Turkey)
- (Turkey) İsmail Arca (against Switzerland)
