= UEFA Euro 1976 qualifying =

Tournament details
- Dates: 1 September 1974 – 22 May 1976
- Teams: 32

Tournament statistics
- Matches played: 104
- Goals scored: 289 (2.78 per match)
- Top scorer: (Republic of Ireland) Don Givens (8 goals)

The qualifying round for the 1976 European Football Championship consisted of 32 teams divided into eight groups of four teams. Each group winner progressed to the quarter-finals. The quarter-finals were played in two legs on a home-and-away basis. The winners of the quarter-finals would go through to the final tournament.

== Qualified teams ==
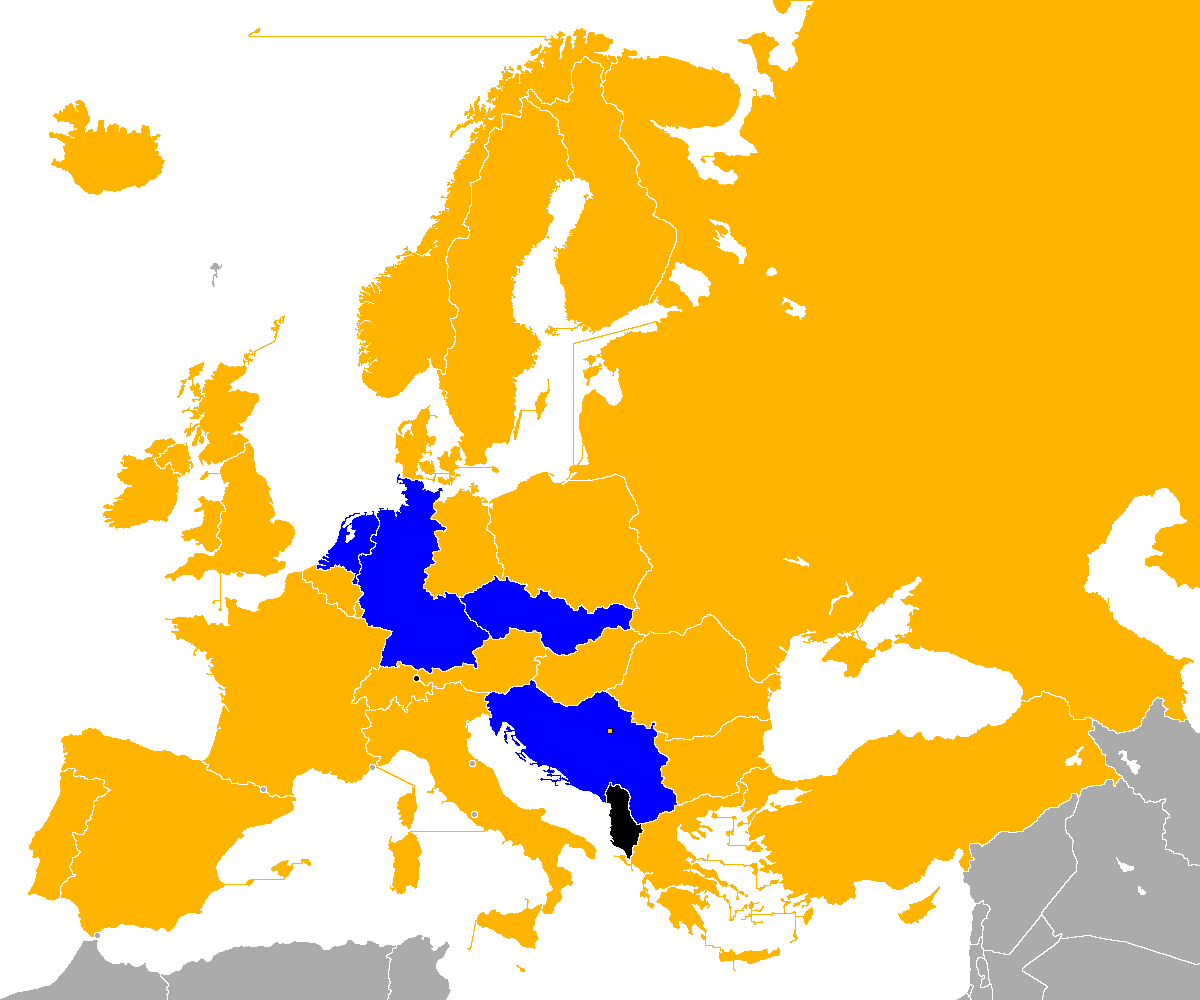
Qualified Did not qualify Did not enter Not a UEFA member

Team	Qualified as	Qualified on	Previous appearances in tournament (Note: Bold indicates champion for that year.)
Czechoslovakia	Quarter-final winner	22 May 1976	1 (1960)
Netherlands	Quarter-final winner	22 May 1976	0 (debut)
West Germany	Quarter-final winner	22 May 1976	1 (**1972**)
Yugoslavia (host)	Quarter-final winner	22 May 1976	2 (1960, 1968)

== Summary ==
Group winners advanced to the quarter-finals (second round)
Other teams were eliminated after the qualifying group stage

Group 1	Group 2	Group 3	Group 4	Group 5	Group 6	Group 7	Group 8
Czechoslovakia	Wales	Yugoslavia	Spain	Netherlands	Soviet Union	Belgium	West Germany
England Portugal Cyprus	Hungary Austria Luxembourg	Northern Ireland Sweden Norway	Romania Scotland Denmark	Poland Italy Finland	Republic of Ireland Turkey Switzerland	East Germany France Iceland	Greece Bulgaria Malta

== Tiebreakers ==
If two or more teams finished level on points after completion of the group matches, the following tie-breakers were used to determine the final ranking:

1. Greater number of points in all group matches
2. Goal difference in all group matches
3. Greater number of goals scored in all group matches
4. Drawing of lots

== Groups ==
=== Group 1 ===
Pos	Team	Pld	W	D	L	GF	GA	GD	Pts	Qualification	(Czechoslovakia)	(England)	(Portugal)	(Cyprus)
1	Czechoslovakia	6	4	1	1	15	5	+10	**9**	Advance to quarter-finals	—	2–1	5–0	4–0
2	England	6	3	2	1	11	3	+8	**8**		3–0	—	0–0	5–0
3	Portugal	6	2	3	1	5	7	−2	**7**		1–1	1–1	—	1–0
4	Cyprus	6	0	0	6	0	16	−16	**0**		0–3	0–1	0–2	—

Source: UEFA

=== Group 2 ===
Pos	Team	Pld	W	D	L	GF	GA	GD	Pts	Qualification	(Wales)	(Hungary)	(Austria)	(Luxembourg)
1	Wales	6	5	0	1	14	4	+10	**10**	Advance to quarter-finals	—	2–0	1–0	5–0
2	Hungary	6	3	1	2	15	8	+7	**7**		1–2	—	2–1	8–1
3	Austria	6	3	1	2	11	7	+4	**7**		2–1	0–0	—	6–2
4	Luxembourg	6	0	0	6	7	28	−21	**0**		1–3	2–4	1–2	—

Source: UEFA

=== Group 3 ===
Pos	Team	Pld	W	D	L	GF	GA	GD	Pts	Qualification	(Socialist Federal Republic of Yugoslavia)	(Northern Ireland)	(Sweden)	(Norway)
1	Yugoslavia	6	5	0	1	12	4	+8	**10**	Advance to quarter-finals	—	1–0	3–0	3–1
2	Northern Ireland	6	3	0	3	8	5	+3	**6**		1–0	—	1–2	3–0
3	Sweden	6	3	0	3	8	9	−1	**6**		1–2	0–2	—	3–1
4	Norway	6	1	0	5	5	15	−10	**2**		1–3	2–1	0–2	—

Source: UEFA

=== Group 4 ===
Pos	Team	Pld	W	D	L	GF	GA	GD	Pts	Qualification	(Spain)	(Romania)	(Scotland)	(Denmark)
1	Spain	6	3	3	0	10	6	+4	**9**	Advance to quarter-finals	—	1–1	1–1	2–0
2	Romania	6	1	5	0	11	6	+5	**7**		2–2	—	1–1	6–1
3	Scotland	6	2	3	1	8	6	+2	**7**		1–2	1–1	—	3–1
4	Denmark	6	0	1	5	3	14	−11	**1**		1–2	0–0	0–1	—

Source: UEFA

=== Group 5 ===
Pos	Team	Pld	W	D	L	GF	GA	GD	Pts	Qualification	(Netherlands)	(Poland)	(Italy)	(Finland)
1	Netherlands	6	4	0	2	14	8	+6	**8**	Advance to quarter-finals	—	3–0	3–1	4–1
2	Poland	6	3	2	1	9	5	+4	**8**		4–1	—	0–0	3–0
3	Italy	6	2	3	1	3	3	0	**7**		1–0	0–0	—	0–0
4	Finland	6	0	1	5	3	13	−10	**1**		1–3	1–2	0–1	—

Source: UEFA

=== Group 6 ===
Pos	Team	Pld	W	D	L	GF	GA	GD	Pts	Qualification	(Soviet Union)	(Republic of Ireland)	(Turkey)	(Switzerland)
1	Soviet Union	6	4	0	2	10	6	+4	**8**	Advance to quarter-finals	—	2–1	3–0	4–1
2	Republic of Ireland	6	3	1	2	11	5	+6	**7**		3–0	—	4–0	2–1
3	Turkey	6	2	2	2	5	10	−5	**6**		1–0	1–1	—	2–1
4	Switzerland	6	1	1	4	5	10	−5	**3**		0–1	1–0	1–1	—

Source: UEFA

=== Group 7 ===
Pos	Team	Pld	W	D	L	GF	GA	GD	Pts	Qualification	(Belgium)	(East Germany)	(France)	(Iceland)
1	Belgium	6	3	2	1	6	3	+3	**8**	Advance to quarter-finals	—	1–2	2–1	1–0
2	East Germany	6	2	3	1	8	7	+1	**7**		0–0	—	2–1	1–1
3	France	6	1	3	2	7	6	+1	**5**		0–0	2–2	—	3–0
4	Iceland	6	1	2	3	3	8	−5	**4**		0–2	2–1	0–0	—

Source: UEFA

=== Group 8 ===
Pos	Team	Pld	W	D	L	GF	GA	GD	Pts	Qualification	(West Germany)	(Greece)	(Bulgaria)	(Malta)
1	West Germany	6	3	3	0	14	4	+10	**9**	Advance to quarter-finals	—	1–1	1–0	8–0
2	Greece	6	2	3	1	12	9	+3	**7**		2–2	—	2–1	4–0
3	Bulgaria	6	2	2	2	12	7	+5	**6**		1–1	3–3	—	5–0
4	Malta	6	1	0	5	2	20	−18	**2**		0–1	2–0	0–2	—

Source: UEFA

== Quarter-finals ==
Team 1	Agg.	Team 2	1st leg	2nd leg
**Yugoslavia**	3–1	Wales	2–0	1–1
**Czechoslovakia**	4–2	Soviet Union	2–0	2–2
Spain	1–3	**West Germany**	1–1	0–2
**Netherlands**	7–1	Belgium	5–0	2–1

== Goalscorers ==
There were 289 goals scored in 104 matches, for an average of 2.78 goals per match.

8 goals

- (Republic of Ireland national football team) Don Givens

6 goals

- (Hungary national football team) Tibor Nyilasi

5 goals

- (Austria national football team) Hans Krankl
- (England national football team) Malcolm Macdonald
- (Netherlands national football team) Johan Cruyff

4 goals

- (Czechoslovakia national football team) Zdeněk Nehoda
- (Czechoslovakia national football team) Antonín Panenka
- (Netherlands national football team) Rob Rensenbrink
- (Romania national football team) Zoltan Crișan
- (Romania national football team) Dudu Georgescu
- (Wales national football team) Arfon Griffiths
- (Germany national football team) Jupp Heynckes
- (Yugoslavia national football team) Josip Katalinski

3 goals

- (Bulgaria national football team) Georgi Denev
- (Czechoslovakia national football team) Přemysl Bičovský
- (Czechoslovakia national football team) Jozef Móder
- (England national football team) Mick Channon
- (France national football team) Jean-Marc Guillou
- (Greece national football team) Antonis Antoniadis
- (Luxembourg national football team) Gilbert Dussier
- (Netherlands national football team) Johan Neeskens
- (Netherlands national football team) Willy van der Kuijlen
- (Norway national football team) Tom Lund
- (Poland national football team) Grzegorz Lato
- (Poland national football team) Andrzej Szarmach
- (Soviet Union national football team) Oleg Blokhin
- (Soviet Union national football team) Viktor Kolotov
- (Wales national football team) John Toshack
- (Germany national football team) Erich Beer

2 goals

- (Austria national football team) Kurt Welzl
- (Bulgaria national football team) Hristo Bonev
- (Bulgaria national football team) Bozhil Kolev
- (Bulgaria national football team) Pavel Panov
- (Czechoslovakia national football team) Marián Masný
- (England national football team) Colin Bell
- (Finland national football team) Timo Rahja
- (Greece national football team) Georgios Delikaris
- (Greece national football team) Mimis Papaioannou
- (Hungary national football team) László Nagy
- (Luxembourg national football team) Nico Braun
- (Luxembourg national football team) Paul Philipp
- (Northern Ireland national football team) Bryan Hamilton
- (Poland national football team) Robert Gadocha
- (Portugal national football team) Nené
- (Scotland national football team) Bruce Rioch
- (Soviet Union national football team) Volodymyr Onyshchenko
- (Spain national football team) Quini
- (Spain national football team) Santillana
- (Sweden men's national football team) Thomas Nordahl
- (Sweden men's national football team) Thomas Sjöberg
- (Wales national football team) Leighton James
- (Germany national football team) Bernhard Cullmann
- (Germany national football team) Ronald Worm
- (Yugoslavia national football team) Branko Oblak
- (Yugoslavia national football team) Momčilo Vukotić

1 goal

- (Austria national football team) Kurt Jara
- (Austria national football team) Helmut Köglberger
- (Austria national football team) Wilhelm Kreuz
- (Austria national football team) Herbert Prohaska
- (Belgium national football team) Raoul Lambert
- (Belgium national football team) Maurice Martens
- (Belgium national football team) Wilfried Puis
- (Belgium national football team) Jacques Teugels
- (Belgium national football team) François Van der Elst
- (Belgium national football team) Roger Van Gool
- (Belgium national football team) Wilfried Van Moer
- (Bulgaria national football team) Borislav Dimitrov
- (Bulgaria national football team) Kiril Milanov
- (Bulgaria national football team) Yordan Yordanov
- (Czechoslovakia national football team) Dušan Galis
- (Czechoslovakia national football team) Anton Ondruš
- (Czechoslovakia national football team) Ladislav Petráš
- (Denmark national football team) Lars Bastrup
- (Denmark national football team) Peter Dahl
- (Denmark national football team) Kristen Nygaard
- (East Germany national football team) Peter Ducke
- (East Germany national football team) Reinhard Häfner
- (East Germany national football team) Martin Hoffmann
- (East Germany national football team) Hans-Jürgen Kreische
- (East Germany national football team) Jürgen Pommerenke
- (East Germany national football team) Jürgen Sparwasser
- (East Germany national football team) Joachim Streich
- (East Germany national football team) Eberhard Vogel
- (England national football team) Kevin Keegan
- (Finland national football team) Matti Paatelainen
- (France national football team) Dominique Bathenay
- (France national football team) Marc Berdoll
- (France national football team) Christian Coste
- (France national football team) Jean Gallice
- (Greece national football team) Kostas Eleftherakis
- (Greece national football team) Lakis Glezos
- (Greece national football team) Konstantinos Iosifidis
- (Greece national football team) Thomas Mavros
- (Greece national football team) Stavros Sarafis
- (Hungary national football team) László Bálint
- (Hungary national football team) László Branikovits
- (Hungary national football team) József Horváth
- (Hungary national football team) Sándor Pintér
- (Hungary national football team) László Pusztai
- (Hungary national football team) Béla Várady
- (Hungary national football team) Tibor Wollek
- (Iceland national football team) Jóhannes Eðvaldsson
- (Iceland national football team) Matthías Hallgrímsson
- (Iceland national football team) Ásgeir Sigurvinsson
- (Italy national football team) Roberto Boninsegna
- (Italy national football team) Fabio Capello
- (Italy national football team) Giorgio Chinaglia
- (Malta national football team) Richard Aquilina
- (Malta national football team) Vincent Magro
- (Netherlands national football team) Ruud Geels
- (Netherlands national football team) Harry Lubse
- (Netherlands national football team) Johnny Rep
- (Netherlands national football team) Wim Rijsbergen
- (Netherlands national football team) Frans Thijssen
- (Netherlands national football team) René van de Kerkhof
- (Northern Ireland national football team) Tommy Finney
- (Northern Ireland national football team) Allan Hunter
- (Northern Ireland national football team) Sammy McIlroy
- (Northern Ireland national football team) Sammy Morgan
- (Northern Ireland national football team) Chris Nicholl
- (Northern Ireland national football team) Martin O'Neill
- (Norway national football team) Erik Just Olsen
- (Norway national football team) Stein Thunberg
- (Poland national football team) Henryk Kasperczak
- (Portugal national football team) João Resende Alves
- (Portugal national football team) Mário Moinhos
- (Portugal national football team) Rui Rodrigues
- (Republic of Ireland national football team) Eoin Hand
- (Republic of Ireland national football team) Mick Martin
- (Republic of Ireland national football team) Ray Treacy
- (Romania national football team) Cornel Dinu
- (Romania national football team) Anghel Iordănescu
- (Romania national football team) Mircea Lucescu
- (Scotland national football team) Billy Bremner
- (Scotland national football team) Kenny Dalglish
- (Scotland national football team) Joe Harper
- (Scotland national football team) Joe Jordan
- (Scotland national football team) Ted MacDougall
- (Scotland national football team) Gordon McQueen
- (Soviet Union national football team) Leonid Buryak
- (Soviet Union national football team) Anatoliy Konkov
- (Soviet Union national football team) Vladimir Muntyan
- (Soviet Union national football team) Volodymyr Veremeyev
- (Spain national football team) José Luis Capón
- (Spain national football team) José Claramunt
- (Spain national football team) Roberto Juan Martínez
- (Spain national football team) Alfredo Megido
- (Spain national football team) Pirri
- (Spain national football team) Manuel Velázquez
- (Spain national football team) Ángel María Villar
- (Sweden men's national football team) Ralf Edström
- (Sweden men's national football team) Ove Grahn
- (Sweden men's national football team) Roland Sandberg
- (Sweden men's national football team) Conny Torstensson
- (Switzerland national football team) Rudolf Elsener
- (Switzerland national football team) Kurt Müller
- (Switzerland national football team) Peter Risi
- (Switzerland national football team) Hanspeter Schild
- (Turkey national football team) İsmail Arca
- (Turkey national football team) Alpaslan Eratlı
- (Turkey national football team) Mehmet Oğuz
- (Wales national football team) Mike England
- (Wales national football team) Ian Evans
- (Wales national football team) John Mahoney
- (Wales national football team) Gil Reece
- (Wales national football team) Phil Roberts
- (Wales national football team) Terry Yorath
- (Germany national football team) Uli Hoeneß
- (Germany national football team) Bernd Hölzenbein
- (Germany national football team) Manfred Ritschel
- (Germany national football team) Klaus Toppmöller
- (Germany national football team) Berti Vogts
- (Germany national football team) Herbert Wimmer
- (Yugoslavia national football team) Vladislav Bogićević
- (Yugoslavia national football team) Ivan Buljan
- (Yugoslavia national football team) Zvonko Ivezić
- (Yugoslavia national football team) Danilo Popivoda
- (Yugoslavia national football team) Ivica Šurjak
- (Yugoslavia national football team) Drago Vabec
- (Yugoslavia national football team) Franjo Vladić

1 own goal

- (Republic of Ireland national football team) Tony Dunne (against Turkey)
- (Soviet Union national football team) Stefan Reshko (against Turkey)
- (Turkey national football team) İsmail Arca (against Switzerland)
