= UEFA Euro 1976 qualifying Group 7 =

Football tournament qualification stage

Group 7 of the UEFA Euro 1976 qualifying tournament was one of the eight groups to decide which teams would qualify for the UEFA Euro 1976 finals tournament. Group 7 consisted of four teams: Belgium, East Germany, France, and Iceland, where they played against each other home-and-away in a round-robin format. The group winners were Belgium, who finished one point above East Germany.

== Final table ==
Pos	Team	Pld	W	D	L	GF	GA	GD	Pts	Qualification	(Belgium)	(East Germany)	(France)	(Iceland)
1	Belgium	6	3	2	1	6	3	+3	8	Advance to quarter-finals	—	1–2	2–1	1–0
2	East Germany	6	2	3	1	8	7	+1	7		0–0	—	2–1	1–1
3	France	6	1	3	2	7	6	+1	5		0–0	2–2	—	3–0
4	Iceland	6	1	2	3	3	8	−5	4		0–2	2–1	0–0	—

Source: UEFA
Rules for classification: Qualification tiebreakers

== Matches ==
8 September 1974
14:00

Iceland	0–2	Belgium
		Van Moer 38'; Teugels 87' (pen.)

Laugardalsvöllur, Reykjavík
Attendance: 7,540
Referee: Thomas Henry Charles Reynolds (Wales)

12 October 1974
17:00

East Germany	1–1	Iceland
Hoffmann 7'		Hallgrímsson 25'

Ernst-Grube-Stadion, Magdeburg
Attendance: 8,410
Referee: Svein Inge Thime (Norway)

12 October 1974
20:00

Belgium	2–1	France
Martens 12'; Van der Elst 75'		Coste 16'

Stade du Heysel, Brussels
Attendance: 32,108
Referee: Kenneth Howard Burns (England)

16 November 1974
20:30

France	2–2	East Germany
Guillou 79'; Gallice 89'		Sparwasser 25'; Kreische 57'

Parc des Princes, Paris
Attendance: 45,381
Referee: Pablo Augusto Sánchez Ibáñez (Spain)

7 December 1974
17:30

East Germany	0–0	Belgium

Zentralstadion, Leipzig
Attendance: 20,557
Referee: Sergio Gonella (Italy)

25 May 1975
14:00

Iceland	0–0	France

Laugardalsvöllur, Reykjavík
Attendance: 7,613
Referee: Malcolm Wright (Northern Ireland)

5 June 1975
20:00

Iceland	2–1	East Germany
Eðvaldsson 12'; Sigurvinsson 32'		Pommerenke 48'

Laugardalsvöllur, Reykjavík
Attendance: 10,373
Referee: Ian Foote (Scotland)

3 September 1975
20:30

France	3–0	Iceland
Guillou 20', 74'; Berdoll 87'

Stade Marcel Saupin, Nantes
Attendance: 25,418
Referee: Albert Victor (Luxembourg)

6 September 1975
20:00

Belgium	1–0	Iceland
Lambert 43'

Stade Sclessin, Liège
Attendance: 9,371
Referee: Henning Lund-Sørensen (Denmark)

27 September 1975
20:00

Belgium	1–2	East Germany
Puis 60'		Ducke 50'; Häfner 71'

Stade Émile Versé, Anderlecht
Attendance: 17,281 *
Referee: Nicolae Rainea (Romania)

(*)NOTE: Attendance also reported as 30,000

12 October 1975
14:30

East Germany	2–1	France
Streich 55'; Vogel 77' (pen.)		Bathenay 50'

Zentralstadion, Leipzig
Attendance: 28,544
Referee: Erik Fredriksson (Sweden)

15 November 1975
20:30

France	0–0	Belgium

Parc des Princes, Paris
Attendance: 35,547
Referee: Robert Holley Davidson (Scotland)

== Goalscorers ==
There were 24 goals scored in 12 matches, for an average of 2 goals per match.

3 goals

- (France) Jean-Marc Guillou

1 goal

- (Belgium) Raoul Lambert
- (Belgium) Maurice Martens
- (Belgium) Wilfried Puis
- (Belgium) Jacques Teugels
- (Belgium) François Van der Elst
- (Belgium) Wilfried Van Moer
- (East Germany) Peter Ducke
- (East Germany) Reinhard Häfner
- (East Germany) Martin Hoffmann
- (East Germany) Hans-Jürgen Kreische
- (East Germany) Jürgen Pommerenke
- (East Germany) Jürgen Sparwasser
- (East Germany) Joachim Streich
- (East Germany) Eberhard Vogel
- (France) Dominique Bathenay
- (France) Marc Berdoll
- (France) Christian Coste
- (France) Jean Gallice
- (Iceland) Jóhannes Eðvaldsson
- (Iceland) Matthías Hallgrímsson
- (Iceland) Ásgeir Sigurvinsson
