= Yugoslavia national football team results (1970–1992) =

This is a list of the Yugoslavia national football team games between 1970 and 1992.

== Socialist Federal Republic of Yugoslavia ==
=== 1970 ===
8 April 1970 International friendly	Yugoslavia	1–1	Austria	Sarajevo, Yugoslavia
	Bajević 47'	Report	Redl 20'	Stadium: Koševo City Stadium; Attendance: 10,000; Referee: István Zsolt (Hungary)

12 April 1970 International friendly	Yugoslavia	2–2	Hungary	Belgrade, Yugoslavia
	Páncsics 33' (o.g.); Gračanin 48'	Report	Fazekasl 19'; Bene 75'	Stadium: JNA Stadium; Attendance: 5,865; Referee: Ferdinand Marschall (Austria)

6 May 1970 International friendly	Romania	0–0	Yugoslavia	Bucharest, Romania
		Report		Stadium: Stadionul Național; Attendance: 60,000; Referee: Petar Nikolov (Bulgaria)

13 May 1970 International friendly	West Germany	1–0	Yugoslavia	Hannover, West Germany
	Seeler 10'	Report		Stadium: Niedersachsenstadion; Attendance: 71,554; Referee: Rudolf Scheurer (Switzerland)

10 September 1970 International friendly	Austria	0–1	Yugoslavia	Graz, Austria
		Report	Bajević 41'	Stadium: Liebenauer Stadium; Attendance: 24,000; Referee: Antonio Sbardella (Italy)

11 October 1970 UEFA Euro 1972 qualifying Group 7	Netherlands	1–1	Yugoslavia	Rotterdam, Netherlands
	Israël 50' (pen.)	Report	Džajić 22'	Stadium: De Kuip; Attendance: 56,200; Referee: William Mullan (Scotland)

14 October 1970 UEFA Euro 1972 qualifying Group 7	Luxembourg	0–2	Yugoslavia	Luxembourg, Luxembourg
		Report	Bukal 44', 62'	Stadium: Stade Municipal; Attendance: 5,163; Referee: Vital Loraux (Belgium)

28 October 1970 International friendly	Soviet Union	4–0	Yugoslavia	Moscow, Soviet Union
	Shevchenko 20'; Fedotov 34'; Kolotov 55'; Nodiya 74'	Report		Stadium: Central Lenin Stadium; Attendance: 25,000; Referee: Marian Środecki (Poland)

18 November 1970 International friendly	Yugoslavia	2–0	West Germany	Zagreb, Yugoslavia
	Bukal 47'; Džajić 87'	Report		Stadium: Stadion Maksimir; Attendance: 25,000; Referee: László Vízhányó (Hungary)

=== 1971 ===
4 April 1971 UEFA Euro 1972 qualifying Group 7	Yugoslavia	2–0	Netherlands	Split, Yugoslavia
	Jerković 8'; Džajić 84'	Report		Stadium: Stadion Stari plac Attendance: 15,563; Referee: Kurt Tshenscher (Germany)

21 April 1971 International friendly	Yugoslavia	0–1	Romania	Novi Sad, Yugoslavia
		Report	Dembrovschi 57'	Stadium: Karađorđe Stadium; Attendance: 15,430; Referee: Stathis Papavasiliou (Greece)

9 May 1971 UEFA Euro 1972 qualifying Group 7	East Germany	1–2	Yugoslavia	Leipzig, East Germany
	Löwe 70'	Report	Filipović 11'; Džajić 19'	Stadium: Zentralstadion; Attendance: 94,876; Referee: Paul Schiller (Austria)

18 July 1971 International friendly	Brazil	2–2	Yugoslavia	Rio de Janeiro, Brazil
	Rivellino 60'; Gérson 65'	Report	Džajić 35'; Jerković 70'	Stadium: Maracanã Stadium; Attendance: 138,575; Referee: Vital Loraux (Belgium)

1 September 1971 International friendly	Hungary	2–1	Yugoslavia	Budapest, Hungary
	Holcer 64' (o.g.); Szőke 82'	Report	Oblak 13'	Stadium: Népstadion; Attendance: 36,000; Referee: Erich Linamayr (Austria)

22 September 1971 International friendly	Yugoslavia	4–0	Mexico	Sarajevo, Yugoslavia
	Bukal 18', 80'; Aćimović 37'; Oblak 70'	Report		Stadium: Stadion Koševo; Attendance: 20,000; Referee: Sándor Petri (Hungary)

16 October 1971 UEFA Euro 1972 qualifying Group 7	Yugoslavia	0–0	East Germany	Belgrade, Yugoslavia
		Report		Stadium: JNA Stadium; Attendance: 2,340; Referee: Jack Taylor (England)

27 October 1971 UEFA Euro 1972 qualifying Group 7	Yugoslavia	0–0	Luxembourg	Titograd, Yugoslavia
		Report		Stadium: Stadion pod Goricom; Attendance: 10,022; Referee: Muzaffer Sarvan (Turkey)

=== 1972 ===
30 April 1972 UEFA Euro 1972 qualifying play-offs	Yugoslavia	0–0	Soviet Union	Belgrade, Yugoslavia
		Report		Stadium: Red Star Stadium; Attendance: 58,312; Referee: Rudolf Scheurer (Switzerland)

13 May 1972 UEFA Euro 1972 qualifying play-offs	Soviet Union	3–0	Yugoslavia	Moscow, Soviet Union
	Kolotov 53'; Banishevskiy 74'; Kozinkevich 90'	Report		Stadium: Central Lenin Stadium; Attendance: 90,300; Referee: Paul Schiller (Austria)

14 June 1972 Brazil Independence Cup	Yugoslavia	10–0	Venezuela	Curitiba, Brazil
	Bajević 5', 7', 48', 68', 74'; Džajić 20'; Aćimović 37'; Popivoda 44'; Stepanović 51'; Katalinski 54'	Report		Stadium: Estádio Couto Pereira; Attendance: 5,000; Referee: Ove Dahlberg (Sweden)

18 June 1972 Brazil Independence Cup	Yugoslavia	1–1	Bolivia	Campo Grande, Brazil
	Katalinski 32'	Report	Pariente 78'	Stadium: Morenão; Attendance: 15,000; Referee: Abraham Klein (Israel)

22 June 1972 Brazil Independence Cup	Yugoslavia	2–1	Paraguay	Manaus, Brazil
	Bajević 50', 86'	Report	Escobar 17'	Stadium: Vivaldão; Attendance: 25,000; Referee: Abraham Klein (Israel)

25 June 1972 Brazil Independence Cup	Yugoslavia	2–1	Peru	Manaus, Brazil
	Bajević 4', 37'	Report	O. Ramírez 11'	Stadium: Vivaldão; Attendance: 20,000; Referee: Alfonso González Archundía (Mexico)

29 June 1972 Brazil Independence Cup	Scotland	2–2	Yugoslavia	Belo Horizonte, Brazil
	Macari 39', 63'	Report	Bajević 60'; buchan 87' (o.g.)	Stadium: Mineirão; Attendance: 4,000; Referee: Ángel Coerezza (Argentina)

2 July 1972 Brazil Independence Cup	Brazil	3–0	Yugoslavia	São Paulo, Brazil
	Leivinha 22', 25'; Jairzinho 65'	Report		Stadium: Estádio do Morumbi; Attendance: 100,000; Referee: Ove Dahlberg (Sweden)

6 July 1972 Brazil Independence Cup	Yugoslavia	2–1	Czechoslovakia	São Paulo, Brazil
	Bajević 19'; Džajić 77'	Report	Hrušecký 37'	Stadium: Estádio do Pacaembu; Attendance: 3,000; Referee: Armando Marques (Brazil)

9 July 1972 Brazil Independence Cup	Yugoslavia	4–2	Argentina	Rio de Janeiro, Brazil
	Bajević 26', 83'; Katalinski 37'; Džajić 64'	Report	Brindisi 58' (pen.), 87' (pen.)	Stadium: Maracanã Stadium; Attendance: 170,000; Referee: Paul Schiller (Austria)

20 September 1972 International friendly	Italy	3–1	Yugoslavia	Turin, Italy
	Riva 54'; Chinaglia 71'; Anastasi 83'	Report	Vukotić 73'	Stadium: Stadio delle Alpi; Attendance: 80,000; Referee: Vital Loraux (Belgium)

11 October 1972 International friendly	England	1–1	Yugoslavia	London, England
	Royle 38'	Report	Vladić 51'	Stadium: Wembley Stadium; Attendance: 50,000; Referee: Aurelio Angonese (Italy)

19 October 1972 1974 FIFA World Cup qualification Group 7	Spain	2–2	Yugoslavia	Las Palmas, Spain
	Amancio 30'; Asensi 89'	Report	Bajević 52', 60'	Stadium: Estadio Insular; Attendance: 30,000; Referee: Keith Walker (England)

18 November 1972 1974 FIFA World Cup qualification Group 7	Yugoslavia	1–0	Greece	Belgrade, Yugoslavia
	Aćimović 14'	Report		Stadium: Red Star Stadium; Attendance: 65,000; Referee: Kurt Tschenscher (Germany)

=== 1973 ===
4 February 1973 International friendly	Tunisia	0–5	Yugoslavia	Tunis, Tunisia
		Report	Bajević 12', 80'; Vladić 26'; Petković 60', 63'	Stadium: El Menzah; Attendance: 10,000; Referee: Kelifi (Algeria)

9 May 1973 International friendly	West Germany	0–1	Yugoslavia	Munich, West Germany
		Report	Bajević 75' (pen.)	Stadium: Olympiastadion; Attendance: 55,000; Referee: Jozef Buzek (Austria)

13 May 1973 International friendly	Poland	2–2	Yugoslavia	Warsaw, Poland
	Lubanski 2'; Masztaler 67'	Report	Pavlović 16'; Bjeković 57'	Attendance: 35,000; Referee: Henry Oberg (Norway)

26 September 1973 International friendly	Yugoslavia	1–1	Hungary	Belgrade, Yugoslavia
	Bjeković 17'	Report	Bene 47'	Stadium: JNA Stadium; Attendance: 30,000; Referee: Sergio Gonella (Italy)

21 October 1973 1974 FIFA World Cup qualification Group 7	Yugoslavia	0–0	Spain	Zagreb, Yugoslavia
		Report		Stadium: Stadion Maksimir; Attendance: 65,000; Referee: Erich Linnemyer (Austria)

19 December 1973 1974 FIFA World Cup qualification Group 7	Greece	2–4	Yugoslavia	Athens, Greece
	Eleftherakis 29'; Katalinski 44' (o.g.)	Report	Bajević 12'; Karasi 15', 90'; Šurjak 62'	Stadium: Georgios Karaiskakis Stadium; Attendance: 10,000; Referee: Kurt Tschenscher (Germany)

=== 1974 ===
13 February 1974 1974 FIFA World Cup qualification Group 7	Yugoslavia	1–0	Spain	Frankfurt, West Germany
	Katalinski 10'	Report		Stadium: Waldstadion; Attendance: 63,000; Referee: Vital Loraux (Belgium)

17 April 1974 International friendly	Yugoslavia	0–1	Soviet Union	Zenica, Yugoslavia
		Report	Kipiani 50'	Stadium: Bilino Polje Stadium; Attendance: 30,000; Referee: Sándor Petri (Hungary)

29 May 1974 International friendly	Hungary	3–2	Yugoslavia	Szekesfehervar, Hungary
	Máté 54', 85'; Fazekas 65' (pen.)	Report	Popivoda 17'; Jerković 21'	Stadium: Sóstói Stadion; Attendance: 16,000; Referee: Heinz Aldinger (Germany)

5 June 1974 International friendly	Yugoslavia	2–2	England	Belgrade, Yugoslavia
	Petković 22'; Oblak 52'	Report	Channon 6'; Keegan 75'	Stadium: Red Star Stadium; Attendance: 80,000; Referee: Sergio Gonella (Italy)

13 June 1974 1974 FIFA World Cup Group 2	Brazil	0–0	Yugoslavia	Frankfurt, West Germany
		Report		Stadium: Waldstadion; Attendance: 62,000; Referee: Rudolf Scheurer (Switzerland)

18 June 1974 1974 FIFA World Cup Group 2	Yugoslavia	9–0	Zaire	Gelsenkirchen, West Germany
	Bajević 8', 30', 81'; Džajić 14'; Šurjak 18'; Katalinski 22'; Bogićević 35'; Oblak 61'; Petković 66'	Report		Stadium: Parkstadion; Attendance: 31,700; Referee: Omar Delgado Gómez (Colombia)

22 June 1974 1974 FIFA World Cup Group 2	Scotland	1–1	Yugoslavia	Frankfurt, West Germany
	Jordan 88'	Report	Karasi 81'	Stadium: Waldstadion; Attendance: 56,000; Referee: Alfonso González Archundía (Mexico)

26 June 1974 1974 FIFA World Cup Second round	Yugoslavia	0–2	West Germany	Düsseldorf, West Germany
		Report	Breitner 39'; Müller 82'	Stadium: Rheinstadion; Attendance: 67,385; Referee: Armando Marques (Brazil)

30 June 1974 1974 FIFA World Cup Second round	Poland	2–1	Yugoslavia	Frankfurt, West Germany
	Deyna 24' (pen.); Lato 62'	Report	Karasi 43'	Stadium: Waldstadion; Attendance: 58,000; Referee: Rudi Glöckner (East Germany)

3 July 1974 1974 FIFA World Cup Second round	Sweden	2–1	Yugoslavia	Düsseldorf, West Germany
	Edström 29'; Torstensson 85'	Report	Šurjak 27'	Stadium: Rheinstadion; Attendance: 41,300; Referee: Luis Pestarino (Argentina)

28 September 1974 International friendly	Yugoslavia	1–0	Italy	Zagreb, Yugoslavia
	Šurjak 41'	Report		Stadium: Stadion Maksimir; Attendance: 40,000; Referee: Gyula Emsberger (Hungary)

30 October 1974 UEFA Euro 1976 qualifying Group 3	Yugoslavia	3–1	Norway	Belgrade, Yugoslavia
	Vukotić 43'; Katalinski 58', 72'	Report	Lund 36'	Stadium: JNA Stadium; Attendance: 9,910; Referee: Antoine Queudeville (Luxembourg)

=== 1975 ===
16 April 1975 UEFA Euro 1976 qualifying Group 3	Northern Ireland	1–0	Yugoslavia	Belfast, Northern Ireland
	Hamilton 23'	Report		Stadium: Windsor Park; Attendance: 26,847; Referee: Robert Wurtz (France)

31 May 1975 International friendly	Yugoslavia	3–0	Netherlands	Belgrade, Yugoslavia
	Savić 12'; Popivoda 20'; Ivezić 80'	Report		Stadium: JNA Stadium; Attendance: 25,000; Referee: Lajos Somlai (Hungary)

4 June 1975 UEFA Euro 1976 qualifying Group 3	Sweden	1–2	Yugoslavia	Stockholm, Sweden
	Edström 16'	Report	Katalinski 41'; Ivezić 77'	Stadium: Råsunda Stadium; Attendance: 27,250; Referee: Vital Loraux (Belgium)

9 June 1975 UEFA Euro 1976 qualifying Group 3	Norway	1–3	Yugoslavia	Oslo, Norway
	Thunberg 65'	Report	Buljan 12' Bogićević 13'; Šurjak 25'	Stadium: Ullevaal; Attendance: 21,843; Referee: Edgar Pedersen (Denmark)

15 October 1975 UEFA Euro 1976 qualifying Group 3	Yugoslavia	3–0	Sweden	Zagreb, Yugoslavia
	Oblak 18'; Vladić 50'; Vabec 82'	Report		Stadium: Stadion Maksimir; Attendance: 29,836; Referee: Walter Hungerbühler (Switzerland)

19 November 1975 UEFA Euro 1976 qualifying Group 3	Yugoslavia	1–0	Northern Ireland	Belgrade, Yugoslavia
	Oblak 21'	Report		Stadium: JNA Stadium; Attendance: 40,000; Referee: Antonio Camacho Jiménez (Spain)

=== 1976 ===
18 February 1976 International friendly	Tunisia	2–1	Yugoslavia	Tunis, Tunisia
	A. Ben Aziza 38'; Kaabi 44'	Report	Šurjak 18'	Stadium: Stade Olympique El Menzah; Attendance: 4,500; Referee: Issaoui Boudabous (Tunisia)

24 February 1976 International friendly	Algeria	1–2	Yugoslavia	Algiers, Algeria
	Abdelkader 57'	Report	Vukotić 16'; Šljivo 60'	Stadium: Stade du 5 Juillet; Attendance: 5,000; Referee: Zanlin Ben Ganif (Algeria)

17 April 1976 International friendly	Yugoslavia	0–0	Hungary	Banja Luka, Yugoslavia
		Report		Stadium: Banja Luka City Stadium; Attendance: 12,000; Referee: Atanas Mateyev (Bulgaria)

24 April 1976 UEFA Euro 1976 qualifying quarter-finals	Yugoslavia	2–0	Wales	Zagreb, Yugoslavia
	Vukotić 1'; Popivoda 54'	Report		Stadium: Stadion Maksimir; Attendance: 36,917; Referee: Paul Schiller (Austria)

22 May 1976 UEFA Euro 1976 qualifying quarter-finals	Wales	1–1	Yugoslavia	Cardiff, Wales
	Evans 38'	Report	Katalinski 19' (pen.)	Stadium: Ninian Park; Attendance: 30,346; Referee: Rudi Glöckner (East Germany)

17 June 1976 UEFA Euro 1976 Semi-finals	Yugoslavia	2–4 (a.e.t.)	West Germany	Belgrade, Yugoslavia
	Popivoda 19'; Džajić 30'	Report	Flohe 65'; Müller 82', 115', 119'	Stadium: Red Star Stadium; Attendance: 50,652; Referee: Alfred Delcourt (Belgium)

19 June 1976 UEFA Euro 1976 Third place	Netherlands	3–2 (a.e.t.)	Yugoslavia	Zagreb, Yugoslavia
	Geels 27', 107'; W. van de Kerkhof 39'	Report	Katalinski 43'; Džajić 82'	Stadium: Stadion Maksimir; Attendance: 6,766; Referee: Walter Hungerbühler (Switzerland)

25 September 1976 International friendly	Italy	3–0	Yugoslavia	Rome, Italy
	Bettega 33', 84'; Graziani 73'	Report		Stadium: Stadio Olimpico; Attendance: 50,000; Referee: Sanchez Ibańez (Spain)

10 October 1976 1978 FIFA World Cup qualification Group 8	Spain	1–0	Yugoslavia	Seville, Spain
	Pirri 86' (pen.)	Report		Stadium: Estadio Ramon Sanchez Pizjuan; Attendance: 30,000; Referee: Károly Palotai (Hungary)

=== 1977 ===
30 January 1977 International friendly	Colombia	0–1	Yugoslavia	Bogotá, Colombia
		Report	Bajević 17'	Stadium: Estadio Nemesio Camacho; Attendance: 35,000; Referee: Mario Canessa (Chile)

1 February 1977 International friendly	Mexico	5–1	Yugoslavia	León, Mexico
	Chavez 14'; Jelikić 41' (o.g.); Isiordia 43'; Alacrán 70'; Vázquez 90'	Report	Bajević 87'	Stadium: Estadio León; Attendance: 20,000; Referee: Enrique Mendoza Guillen (Mexico)

8 February 1977 International friendly	Mexico	0–1	Yugoslavia	Monterrey, Mexico
		Report	Bajević 9'	Stadium: Estadio Universitario; Attendance: 15,000; Referee: Javier Galindo (Mexico)

23 March 1977 International friendly	Yugoslavia	2–4	Soviet Union	Belgrade, Yugoslavia
	Bajević 27'; Jerković 70'	Report	Blokhin 42', 61'; Kipiani 54'; Buryak 86' (pen.)	Stadium: JNA Stadium; Attendance: 17,000; Referee: Pablo Sánchez Ibáñez (Spain)

30 April 1977 International friendly	Yugoslavia	1–2	West Germany	Belgrade, Yugoslavia
	Bajević 60'	Report	Müller 11'; Bonhof 72' (pen.)	Stadium: Red Star Stadium; Attendance: 17,000; Referee: Doğan Babacan (Turkey)

8 May 1977 1978 FIFA World Cup qualification Group 8	Yugoslavia	0–2	Romania	Zagreb, Yugoslavia
		Report	D. Georgescu 37'; Iordănescu 44'	Stadium: Stadion Maksimir; Attendance: 45,000; Referee: Menahem Ashkenazi (Israel)

26 June 1977 International friendly	Brazil	0–0	Yugoslavia	Belo Horizonte, Brazil
		Report		Stadium: Mineirão; Attendance: 110,000; Referee: Armando Marquez (Brazil)

3 July 1977 International friendly	Argentina	1–0	Yugoslavia	Buenos Aires, Argentina
	Passarella 33' (pen.)	Report		Stadium: La Bombonera; Attendance: 60,000; Referee: Juan Ambrosio Silvagno Cavanna (Chile)

5 October 1977 International friendly	Hungary	4–3	Yugoslavia	Budapest, Hungary
	Kereki 17'; Törőcsik 43', 68'; Váradi 55' (pen.)	Report	Sušić 14', 83'; Nikolić 85'	Stadium: Népstadion; Attendance: 20,000; Referee: Valentin Lipatov (Soviet Union)

13 November 1977 1978 FIFA World Cup qualification Group 8	Romania	4–6	Yugoslavia	Bucharest, Romania
	Vigu 2'; Iordănescu 40'; Bölöni 44'; Georgescu 67'	Report	Sušić 14', 51', 62'; Mužinić 18'; Trifunović 79'; Filipović 84'	Stadium: Stadionul Steaua; Attendance: 35,000; Referee: Alfred Delcourt (Belgium)

16 November 1977 Balkan Cup	Greece	0–0	Yugoslavia	Thessaloniki, Greece
		Report		Stadium: Kleanthis Vikelidis Stadium; Attendance: 20,000; Referee: Boris Trendafilov (Bulgaria)

30 November 1977 1978 FIFA World Cup qualification Group 8	Yugoslavia	0–1	Spain	Belgrade, Yugoslavia
		Report	Cano 71'	Stadium: Red Star Stadium; Attendance: 66,285; Referee: Ken Burns (England)

=== 1978 ===
5 April 1978 International friendly	Iran	0–0	Yugoslavia	Tehran, Iran
		Report		Stadium: Aryamehr Stadium; Attendance: 40,000; Referee: Jafar Namdar (Iran)

18 May 1978 International friendly	Italy	0–0	Yugoslavia	Rome, Italy
		Report		Stadium: Stadio Olimpico; Attendance: 25,000; Referee: Jean Dubach (Switzerland)

4 October 1978 UEFA Euro 1980 qualifying Group 3	Yugoslavia	1–2	Spain	Zagreb, Yugoslavia
	Halilhodžić 44'	Report	Juanito 20'; Santillana 32'	Stadium: Maksimir Stadium; Attendance: 41,539; Referee: Erich Linemayr (Austria)

25 October 1978 UEFA Euro 1980 qualifying Group 3	Romania	3–2	Yugoslavia	Bucharest, Romania
	Sameş 62', 68'; Iordănescu 75' (pen.)	Report	Petrović 22' (pen.); Desnica 90'	Stadium: Stadionul Steaua; Attendance: 24,090; Referee: Riccardo Lattanzi (Italy)

15 November 1978 Balkan Cup	Yugoslavia	4–1	Greece	Skopje, Yugoslavia
	Halilhodžić 33', 58', 82' (pen.); Savić 47'	Report	Mavros 31'	Stadium: Stadion Gradski Park; Attendance: 12,000; Referee: Bogdan Dochev (Bulgaria)

=== 1979 ===
1 April 1979 UEFA Euro 1980 qualifying Group 3	Cyprus	0–3	Yugoslavia	Nicosia, Cyprus
		Report	Vujović 41', 78'; Šurjak 82'	Stadium: Makario Stadium; Attendance: 3,376; Referee: László Pádár (Hungary)

13 June 1979 International friendly	Yugoslavia	4–1	Italy	Zagreb, Yugoslavia
	Sušić 27', 34', 65'; Zajec 86'	Report	Rossi 24'	Stadium: Stadion Maksimir; Attendance: 25,000; Referee: Walter Eschweile (Germany)

16 September 1979 International friendly	Yugoslavia	4–2	Argentina	Belgrade, Yugoslavia
	Sušić 22', 53', 68'; Slišković 87'	Report	Passarella 81'; Díaz 87'	Stadium: Red Star Stadium; Attendance: 20,000; Referee: Romeo Stincan (Romania)

10 October 1979 UEFA Euro 1980 qualifying Group 3	Spain	0–1	Yugoslavia	Valencia, Spain
		Report	Šurjak 5'	Stadium: Estadio Mestalla; Attendance: 28,078; Referee: Brian McGinlay (Scotland)

31 October 1979 UEFA Euro 1980 qualifying Group 3	Yugoslavia	2–1	Romania	Kosovska Mitrovica, Yugoslavia
	Vujović 48'; Slišković 50'	Report	Răducanu 79'	Stadium: Gradski stadion Attendance: 24,397; Referee: Jan Redelfs (Germany)

14 November 1979 UEFA Euro 1980 qualifying Group 3	Yugoslavia	5–0	Cyprus	Novi Sad, Yugoslavia
	Kranjčar 32', 50'; Vujović 60'; Petrović 75'; Savić 87'	Report		Stadium: Gradski stadion Attendance: 14,134; Referee: Yordan Zhezhov (Bulgaria)

=== 1980 ===
22 March 1980 International friendly	Yugoslavia	2–1	Uruguay	Sarajevo, Yugoslavia
	Klinčarski 8'; Vujović 59'	Report	Primorac 75' (o.g.)	Stadium: Stadion Koševo; Attendance: 30,000; Referee: Nikos Lagoyannis (Greece)

30 March 1980 Balkan Cup	Yugoslavia	2–0	Romania	Belgrade, Yugoslavia
	Krstičević 35'; Sušić 61'	Report		Stadium: Omladinski Stadium; Attendance: 7,000; Referee: Nihat Özbirgül (Turkey)

26 April 1980 International friendly	Yugoslavia	2–1	Poland	Borovo, Yugoslavia
	Miročević 34', 68'	Report	Sybis 28'	Stadium: Stadion NK Borovo; Attendance: 10,000; Referee: Sándor Kuti (Hungary)

27 August 1980 Balkan Cup	Romania	4–1	Yugoslavia	Bucharest, Romania
	Iordănescu 21', 55' (pen.), 84' (pen.); Cămătaru 25'	Report	Sušić 74' (pen.)	Stadium: Stadionul Național; Attendance: 25,000; Referee: Antonis Vassaras (Greece)

10 September 1980 1982 FIFA World Cup qualification Group 5	Luxembourg	0–5	Yugoslavia	Luxembourg, Luxembourg
		Report	Sušić 50'; Vujović 64', 81'; Petrović 70'; Buljan 90'	Stadium: Municipal; Attendance: 3,500; Referee: Franz Latzin (Austria)

27 September 1980 1982 FIFA World Cup qualification Group 5	Yugoslavia	2–1	Denmark	Ljubljana, Yugoslavia
	Pantelić 18' (pen.); Vujović 37'	Report	Arnesen 5' (pen.)	Stadium: Bežigrad Stadium; Attendance: 20,000; Referee: Antonio Garrido (Portugal)

15 November 1980 1982 FIFA World Cup qualification Group 5	Italy	2–0	Yugoslavia	Turin, Italy
	Cabrini 40' (pen.); Conti 75'	Report		Stadium: Stadio Comunale Vittorio Pozzo; Attendance: 50,677; Referee: Abraham Klein (Israel)

=== 1981 ===
25 March 1981 International friendly	Yugoslavia	2–1	Bulgaria	Subotica, Yugoslavia
	Halilhodžić 1'; Slišković 26'	Report	Slavkov 25'	Stadium: Gradski stadion Attendance: 20,000; Referee: Róbert Jaczina (Hungary)

29 April 1981 1982 FIFA World Cup qualification Group 5	Yugoslavia	5–1	Greece	Split, Yugoslavia
	Šljivo 7'; Halilhodžić 23'; Pantelić 42' (pen.); Vujović 50', 56'	Report	Kostikos 76' (pen.)	Stadium: Stadion Poljud; Attendance: 45,000; Referee: Valeri Butenko (Soviet Union)

9 September 1981 1982 FIFA World Cup qualification Group 5	Denmark	1–2	Yugoslavia	Copenhagen, Denmark
	Elkjær 62'	Report	Vujović 48'; Petrović 63'	Stadium: Idrætsparken; Attendance: 48,400; Referee: Siegfried Kirschen (East Germany)

17 October 1981 1982 FIFA World Cup qualification Group 5	Yugoslavia	1–1	Italy	Belgrade, Yugoslavia
	Vujović 9'	Report	Bettega 33'	Stadium: Red Star Stadium; Attendance: 70,000; Referee: Walter Eschweiler (Germany)

21 November 1981 1982 FIFA World Cup qualification Group 5	Yugoslavia	5–0	Luxembourg	Novi Sad, Yugoslavia
	Halilhodžić 1', 45'; Šurjak 65'; Pašić 73'; Vujović 75'	Report		Stadium: Karađorđe Stadium; Attendance: 20,000; Referee: Charles Scerri (Malta)

29 November 1981 1982 FIFA World Cup qualification Group 5	Greece	1–2	Yugoslavia	Athens, Greece
	Mavros 6'	Report	Šurjak 22'; Jerković 39'	Stadium: Karaiskaki Stadium; Attendance: 11,595; Referee: George Courtney (England)

=== 1982 ===
17 February 1982 Nehru Cup	Uruguay	1–0	Yugoslavia	Calcutta, India
	Francescoli 18'			Stadium: Eden Gardens

17 June 1982 1982 FIFA World Cup Group 5	Yugoslavia	0–0	Northern Ireland	Zaragoza, Spain
		Report		Stadium: La Romareda; Attendance: 25,000; Referee: Erik Fredriksson (Sweden)

20 June 1982 1982 FIFA World Cup Group 5	Spain	2–1	Yugoslavia	Valencia, Spain
	Juanito 14' (pen.); Saura 66'	Report	Gudelj 10'	Stadium: Estadio Luis Casanova; Attendance: 48,000; Referee: Henning Lund-Sørensen (Denmark)

24 June 1982 1982 FIFA World Cup Group 5	Honduras	0–1	Yugoslavia	Zaragoza, Spain
		Report	Petrović 88' (pen.)	Stadium: La Romareda; Attendance: 25,000; Referee: Gastón Castro (Chile)

13 October 1982 UEFA Euro 1984 qualifying Group 4	Norway	3–1	Yugoslavia	Oslo, Norway
	Tom Lund 5'; Larsen Økland 67'; Hareide 88'	Report	Savić 74'	Stadium: Ullevaal Stadion; Attendance: 12,264; Referee: Alojzy Jarguz (Poland)

17 November 1982 UEFA Euro 1984 qualifying Group 4	Bulgaria	0–1	Yugoslavia	Sofia, Bulgaria
		Report	Stojković 36'	Stadium: Vasil Levski National Stadium; Attendance: 20,000; Referee: Paolo Casarin (Italy)

15 December 1982 UEFA Euro 1984 qualifying Group 4	Yugoslavia	4–4	Wales	Titograd, Yugoslavia
	Cvetković 14'; Živković 17'; Kranjčar 37'; Ješić 66'	Report	Flynn 6'; Rush 38'; Jones 70'; James 80'	Stadium: Gradski Stadion; Attendance: 17,000; Referee: Alexis Ponnet (Belgium)

=== 1983 ===
30 March 1983 International friendly	Romania	0–2	Yugoslavia	Timișoara, Romania
		Report	Džeko 13'; Trifunović 86'	Stadium: Stadionul 1 Mai; Attendance: 25,000; Referee: Matevos Mkrtchian (Soviet Union)

23 April 1983 International friendly	France	4–0	Yugoslavia	Paris, France
	LeRoux 21'; Rocheteau 30', 47'; Touré 73'	Report		Stadium: Parc des Princes; Attendance: 40,881; Referee: Aron Schmidhuber (Germany)

1 June 1983 International friendly	Yugoslavia	1–0	Romania	Sarajevo, Yugoslavia
	Munteanu 59' (o.g.)	Report		Stadium: Koševo City Stadium; Attendance: 15,000; Referee: Siegfried Kirschen (East Germany)

7 June 1983 International friendly	Yugoslavia	2–4	West Germany	Luxembourg, Luxembourg
	Ješić 62'; Miljanović 80'	Report	Meier 13', 20'; Schuster 78'; Rummenigge 87'	Stadium: Stade Municipal; Attendance: 11,000; Referee: Francis Bastian (Luxembourg)

12 October 1983 UEFA Euro 1984 qualifying Group 4	Yugoslavia	2–1	Norway	Belgrade, Yugoslavia
	Vujović 21'; Sušić 40'	Report	Thoresen 89'	Stadium: JNA Stadium; Attendance: 9,169; Referee: Adolf Prokop (East Germany)

26 October 1983 International friendly	Switzerland	2–0	Yugoslavia	Basel, Switzerland
	Sutter 49'; Brigger 84'	Report		Stadium: St. Jakob Stadium; Attendance: 9,000; Referee: Jean Koster (Luxembourg)

12 November 1983 International friendly	Yugoslavia	0–0	France	Zagreb, Yugoslavia
		Report		Stadium: Stadion Maksimir; Attendance: 15,000; Referee: Paolo Casarin (Italy)

14 December 1983 UEFA Euro 1984 qualifying Group 4	Wales	1–1	Yugoslavia	Cardiff, Wales
	James 54'	Report	Baždarević 81'	Stadium: Ninian Park; Attendance: 24,000; Referee: Erik Fredriksson (Sweden)

21 December 1983 UEFA Euro 1984 qualifying Group 4	Yugoslavia	3–2	Bulgaria	Split, Yugoslavia
	Sušić 31', 53'; Radanović 90+1'	Report	Iskrenov 28'; Dimitrov 60'	Stadium: Stadion Poljud; Attendance: 30,000; Referee: Augusto Lamo Castillo (Spain)

=== 1984 ===
31 March 1984 International friendly	Yugoslavia	2–1	Hungary	Subotica, Yugoslavia
	Đurovski 66'; Radanović 80' (pen.)	Report	Gyimesi 86'	Stadium: Subotica City Stadium; Attendance: 25,000; Referee: Robert Matušík (Soviet Union)

2 June 1984 International friendly	Portugal	2–3	Yugoslavia	Oeiras, Portugal
	Jordão 14', 33'	Report	Sušić 29'; Halilović 43'; Stojković 83' (pen.)	Stadium: Estádio Nacional; Attendance: 10,000; Referee: José Luis García Carrión (Spain)

7 June 1984 International friendly	Spain	0–1	Yugoslavia	La Linea, Spain
		Report	Sušić 1'	Stadium: Estadio Municipal José Antonio; Attendance: 20,000; Referee: Enzo Barbaresco (Italy)

13 June 1984 UEFA Euro 1984 Group 1	Belgium	2–0	Yugoslavia	Lens, France
	Vandenbergh 28'; Grün 45'	Report (UEFA); Report		Stadium: Stade Félix-Bollaert; Attendance: 41,525; Referee: Erik Fredriksson (Sweden)

16 June 1984 UEFA Euro 1984 Group 1	Denmark	5–0	Yugoslavia	Lyon, France
	Arnesen 7', 69' (pen.); Berggreen 16'; Elkjær 82'; Lauridsen 84'	Report (UEFA); Report		Stadium: Stade de Gerland; Attendance: 34,736; Referee: Augusto Lamo Castillo (Spain)

19 June 1984 UEFA Euro 1984 Group 1	France	3–2	Yugoslavia	Saint-Étienne, France
	Platini 59', 62', 77'	Report (UEFA); Report	Šestić 32'; Stojković 84' (pen.)	Stadium: Stade Geoffroy-Guichard; Attendance: 47,510; Referee: André Daina (Switzerland)

12 September 1984 International friendly	Scotland	6–1	Yugoslavia	Glasgow, Scotland
	Cooper 12'; Souness 19'; Dalglish 32'; Sturrock 62'; Johnston 65'; Nicholas 77'	Report	Vokrri 10'	Stadium: Hampden Park; Attendance: 18,512; Referee: Keith Hackett (England)

29 September 1984 1986 FIFA World Cup qualification Group 4	Yugoslavia	0–0	Bulgaria	Belgrade, Yugoslavia
		Report		Stadium: JNA Stadium; Attendance: 18,000; Referee: Laszlo Padar (Hungary)

20 October 1984 1986 FIFA World Cup qualification Group 4	East Germany	2–3	Yugoslavia	Leipzig, East Germany
	Glowatzky 11'; Ernst 50'	Report	Baždarević 30'; Vokrri 48'; Šestić 80'	Stadium: Zentralstadion; Attendance: 55,045; Referee: Horst Brummeier (Austria)

=== 1985 ===
20 January 1985 Nehru Cup	Yugoslavia	3–1	Iran	Kochi, India
	Baljić 37', 65'; Mlinarić 82'	Report	Bayani 75'	Stadium: Maharaja College Stadium; Attendance: 55,000; Referee: Sanches Tharakten (India)

25 January 1985 Nehru Cup	Yugoslavia	2–1	Soviet Union	Kochi, India
	Hadžibegić 15'; Vujović 80'	Report	Larionov 11'	Stadium: Aria Mehre Stadium; Attendance: 60,000; Referee: Park Hee Chang (South Korea)

29 January 1985 Nehru Cup	Yugoslavia	1–1	China	Kochi, India
	Živković 63'	Report	Wei Kexing 60'	Stadium: Maharaja College Stadium; Attendance: 35,000; Referee: Tarak Sen (India)

1 February 1985 Nehru Cup	Yugoslavia	3–1	South Korea	Kochi, India
	Vokrri 19'; Gudelj 63'; Vujović 88'	Report	Sam Soo Kim 61'	Stadium: Maharaja College Stadium; Attendance: 40,000; Referee: Bao Yu Tsen (China)

4 February 1985 Nehru Cup	Yugoslavia	1–2	Soviet Union	Kochi, India
	Hadžibegić 22' (pen.)	Report	Aleynikov 11'; Kondratyev 55'	Stadium: Maharaja College Stadium; Attendance: 55,000; Referee: Syed Shahid Hakim (India)

27 March 1985 1986 FIFA World Cup qualification Group 4	Yugoslavia	1–0	Luxembourg	Zenica, Yugoslavia
	Gudelj 36'	Report		Stadium: Bilino Polje; Attendance: 30,000; Referee: Alexandr Mushkovets (Soviet Union)

3 April 1985 1986 FIFA World Cup qualification Group 4	Yugoslavia	0–0	France	Sarajevo, Yugoslavia
		Report		Stadium: Koševo Stadium; Attendance: 53,500; Referee: Erik Fredriksson (Sweden)

1 May 1985 1986 FIFA World Cup qualification Group 4	Luxembourg	0–1	Yugoslavia	Luxembourg, Luxembourg
		Report	Vokrri 89'	Stadium: Stade Municipal; Attendance: 6,550; Referee: Gudmund Haraldsson (Iceland)

3 June 1985 1986 FIFA World Cup qualification Group 4	Bulgaria	2–1	Yugoslavia	Sofia, Bulgaria
	Getov 27', 58'	Report	Đurovski 29'	Stadium: Vasil Levski National Stadium; Attendance: 60,000; Referee: Vojtech Christov (Czechoslovakia)

28 September 1985 1986 FIFA World Cup qualification Group 4	Yugoslavia	1–2	East Germany	Belgrade, Yugoslavia
	Škoro 83'	Report	Thom 47', 59'	Stadium: JNA Stadium; Attendance: 35,000; Referee: Velodi Miminoshvili (Soviet Union)

16 October 1985 International friendly	Austria	0–3	Yugoslavia	Linz, Austria
		Report	Vujović 11', 64'; Mrkela 43'	Stadium: Linzer Stadion; Attendance: 15,000; Referee: Roger Schoeters (Belgium)

16 November 1985 1986 FIFA World Cup qualification Group 4	France	2–0	Yugoslavia	Paris, France
	Platini 2', 71'	Report		Stadium: Parc des Princes; Attendance: 45,670; Referee: Alexis Ponnet (Belgium)

=== 1986 ===
30 April 1986 International friendly	Brazil	4–2	Yugoslavia	Recife, Brazil
	Zico 29', 59' (pen.), 76'; Dirceu 80'	Report	Gračan 42'; Janković 55'	Stadium: Estádio do Arruda; Attendance: 70,000; Referee: José Roberto Ramiz Wright (Brazil)

11 May 1986 International friendly	West Germany	1–1	Yugoslavia	Bochum, West Germany
	Völler 61'	Report	Škoro 5'	Stadium: Ruhrstadion; Attendance: 30,000; Referee: Ulf Eriksson (Sweden)

19 May 1986 International friendly	Belgium	1–3	Yugoslavia	Brussels, Belgium
	Claesen 60'	Report	Škoro 7'; Gračan 23'; Vujović 36' (pen.)	Stadium: Heysel Stadium; Attendance: 15,000; Referee: Alain Delmer (France)

29 October 1986 UEFA Euro 1988 qualifying Group 4	Yugoslavia	4–0	Turkey	Split, Yugoslavia
	Vujović 25', 33', 83'; Savićević 75'	Report		Stadium: Stadion Poljud; Attendance: 11,270; Referee: Carlo Longhi (Italy)

12 November 1986 UEFA Euro 1988 qualifying Group 4	England	2–0	Yugoslavia	London, England
		Report	Mabbutt 21'; Anderson 57'	Stadium: Wembley Stadium; Attendance: 60,000; Referee: Franz Wöhrer (Austria)

=== 1987 ===
23 March 1987 International friendly	Yugoslavia	4–0	Austria	Banja Luka, Yugoslavia
	Pančev 39', 80'; Stojković 57'; Tuce 77'	Report		Stadium: Banja Luka City Stadium; Attendance: 25,000; Referee: Renzo Peduzzi (Switzerland)

29 April 1987 UEFA Euro 1988 qualifying Group 4	Northern Ireland	1–2	Yugoslavia	Belfast, Northern Ireland
	Clarke 40'	Report	Stojković 47'; Vujović 80'	Stadium: Windsor Park; Attendance: 5,482; Referee: Werner Föckler (Germany)

29 August 1987 International friendly	Yugoslavia	0–1	Soviet Union	Belgrade, Yugoslavia
		Report	Dobrovolskiy 43'	Stadium: Red Star Stadium; Attendance: 15,000; Referee: Nedelko Tahtadzijev (Bulgaria)

23 September 1987 International friendly	Italy	1–0	Yugoslavia	Pisa, Italy
	Altobelli 24'	Report		Stadium: Arena Garibaldi; Attendance: 21,729; Referee: Emilio Soriano Aladren (Spain)

14 October 1987 UEFA Euro 1988 qualifying Group 4	Yugoslavia	3–0	Northern Ireland	Sarajevo, Yugoslavia
	Vokrri 12', 34'; Hadžibegić 74' (pen.)	Report		Stadium: Grbavica Stadium; Attendance: 14,075; Referee: Klaus Peschel (Germany)

11 November 1987 UEFA Euro 1988 qualifying Group 4	Yugoslavia	1–4	England	Belgrade, Yugoslavia
	Katanec 80'	Report	Beardsley 3'; Barnes 17'; Robson 20'; Adams 25'	Stadium: Red Star Stadium; Attendance: 49,744; Referee: Michel Vautrot (France)

16 December 1987 UEFA Euro 1988 qualifying Group 4	Turkey	2–3	Yugoslavia	İzmir, Turkey
	Yusuf 68'; Feyyaz 73'	Report	Radanović 5'; Katanec 40'; Hadžibegić 54' (pen.)	Stadium: Alsancak Stadı; Attendance: 4,657; Referee: Bruno Galler (Switzerland)

=== 1988 ===
23 March 1988 International friendly	Wales	1–2	Yugoslavia	Swansea, Wales
	Saunders 7'	Report	Stojković 43'; Jakovljević 71'	Stadium: Vetch Field; Attendance: 5,985; Referee: Robert Stewart (Northern Ireland)

31 March 1988 International friendly	Yugoslavia	1–1	Italy	Split, Yugoslavia
	Jakovljević 45'	Report	Vialli 10'	Stadium: Stadion Poljud; Attendance: 12,000; Referee: Helmuth Kohl (Austria)

27 April 1988 International friendly	Republic of Ireland	2–0	Yugoslavia	Dublin, Ireland
	McCarty 24'; Moran 64'	Report		Stadium: Lansdowne Road; Attendance: 12,000; Referee: George Smith (Scotland)

4 June 1988 International friendly	West Germany	1–1	Yugoslavia	Bremen, West Germany
	Matthäus 65'	Report	Baljić 15'	Stadium: Weserstadion; Attendance: 13,000; Referee: Anatolij Spirin (Soviet Union)

24 August 1988 International friendly	Switzerland	0–2	Yugoslavia	Lucerne, Switzerland
		Report	Mihajlović 65'; Đukić 82'	Stadium: Stadion Allmend; Attendance: 6,700; Referee: Jean-Marie Lartigot (France)

14 September 1988 International friendly	Spain	1–2	Yugoslavia	Oviedo, Spain
	Míchel 25'	Report	Baždarević 46'; Cvetković 84'	Stadium: Estadio Carlos Tartiere; Attendance: 22,000; Referee: Alder Dante da Silva Santos (Portugal)

19 October 1988 1990 FIFA World Cup qualification Group 5	Scotland	1–1	Yugoslavia	Glasgow, Scotland
	Johnston 19'	Report	Katanec 37'	Stadium: Hampden Park; Attendance: 42,771; Referee: Karl-Heinz Tritschler (Germany)

19 November 1988 1990 FIFA World Cup qualification Group 5	Yugoslavia	3–2	France	Belgrade, Yugoslavia
	Spasić 11'; Sušić 76'; Stojković 82'	Report	Perez 3'; Sauzée 68'	Stadium: JNA Stadium; Attendance: 7,489; Referee: Erik Fredriksson (Sweden)

11 December 1988 1990 FIFA World Cup qualification Group 5	Yugoslavia	4–0	Cyprus	Belgrade, Yugoslavia
	Savićević 13', 33', 82'; Hadžibegić 44' (pen.)	Report		Stadium: Red Star Stadium; Attendance: 15,246; Referee: Todor Kolev (Bulgaria)

=== 1989 ===
4 April 1989 International friendly	Greece	1–4	Yugoslavia	Athens, Greece
	Mitropoulos 60'	Report	Vujović 22', 83'; Tuce 75'; Jakovljević 80'	Stadium: Olympic Stadium; Attendance: 6,000; Referee: Friedrich Kaupe (Austria)

29 April 1989 1990 FIFA World Cup qualification Group 5	France	0–0	Yugoslavia	Paris, France
		Report		Stadium: Parc des Princes; Attendance: 34,287; Referee: Tulio Lanese (Italy)

27 May 1989 International friendly	Belgium	1–0	Yugoslavia	Brussels, Belgium
	Van Der Linden 77' (pen.)	Report		Stadium: Heysel Stadium; Attendance: 5,000; Referee: Serge Rumenthaler (Austria)

14 June 1989 1990 FIFA World Cup qualification Group 5	Norway	1–2	Yugoslavia	Oslo, Norway
	Fjørtoft 88'	Report	Stojković 23'; Vujović 87'	Stadium: Ullevaal Stadium; Attendance: 22,740; Referee: Vadim Zhuk (Soviet Union)

23 August 1989 International friendly	Finland	2–2	Yugoslavia	Kuopio, Finland
	Spasić 1' (o.g.); Lipponen 27'	Report	Pančev 12'; Savićević 51'	Stadium: Väinölänniemen Stadium; Attendance: 6,386; Referee: Håkan Lundgren (Sweden)

6 September 1989 1990 FIFA World Cup qualification Group 5	Yugoslavia	3–1	Scotland	Zagreb, Yugoslavia
	Katanec 52'; Gillespie 58' (o.g.); Vujović 59'	Report	Durie 37'	Stadium: Stadion Maksimir; Attendance: 42,500; Referee: Marcel van Langenhove (Belgium)

20 September 1989 International friendly	Yugoslavia	3–0	Greece	Novi Sad, Yugoslavia
	Brnović 8'; Prosinečki 16'; Pančev 83'	Report		Stadium: Karađorđe Stadium; Attendance: 8,000; Referee: Gabor Pleszek (Hungary)

11 October 1989 1990 FIFA World Cup qualification Group 5	Yugoslavia	1–0	Norway	Sarajevo, Yugoslavia
	Hadžibegić 44' (pen.)	Report		Stadium: Olympic Stadium; Attendance: 32,000; Referee: Yusuf Namoğlu (Turkey)

28 October 1989 1990 FIFA World Cup qualification Group 5	Cyprus	1–2	Yugoslavia	Athens, Greece
	Pittas 38' (pen.)	Report	Stanojković 5'; Pančev 49'	Stadium: Olympic Stadium; Attendance: 1,046; Referee: Ioan Igna (Romania)

14 November 1989 International friendly	Brazil	0–0	Yugoslavia	João Pessoa, Brazil
		Report		Stadium: Almeidão; Attendance: 45,000; Referee: Pietro d’Elia (Italy)

13 December 1989 International friendly	England	2–1	Yugoslavia	London, England
	Robson 1', 70'	Report	Škoro 17'	Stadium: Wembley Stadium; Attendance: 45,000; Referee: Dieter Pauly (West Germany)

=== 1990 ===
28 March 1990 International friendly	Poland	0–0	Yugoslavia	Łódź, Poland
		Report		Stadium: Widzew Stadium; Attendance: 10,000; Referee: László Molnár (Switzerland)

26 May 1990 International friendly	Yugoslavia	0–1	Spain	Ljubljana, Yugoslavia
		Report	Butragueño 56'	Stadium: Bežigrad Stadium; Attendance: 10,000; Referee: Rosario Lo Bello (Italy)

3 June 1990 International friendly	Yugoslavia	0–2	Netherlands	Zagreb, Yugoslavia
		Report	Rijkaard 53'; van Basten 83'	Stadium: Stadion Maksimir; Attendance: 30,000; Referee: Friedrich Kaupe (Austria)

10 June 1990 1990 FIFA World Cup Group D	West Germany	4–1	Yugoslavia	Milan, Italy
21:00	Matthäus 28', 64'; Klinsmann 39'; Völler 70'	Report	Jozić 55'	Stadium: San Siro; Attendance: 74,765; Referee: Peter Mikkelsen (Denmark)

14 June 1990 1990 FIFA World Cup Group D	Yugoslavia	1–0	Colombia	Bologna, Italy
17:00	Jozić 75'	Report		Stadium: Stadio Renato Dall'Ara; Attendance: 32,257; Referee: Luigi Agnolin (Italy)

19 June 1990 1990 FIFA World Cup Group D	Yugoslavia	4–1	United Arab Emirates	Bologna, Italy
17:00	Sušić 5'; Pančev 9', 46'; Prosinečki 90+3'	Report	Jumaa 22'	Stadium: Stadio Renato Dall'Ara; Attendance: 27,833; Referee: Shizuo Takada (Japan)

26 June 1990 1990 FIFA World Cup Round of 16	Spain	1–2 (a.e.t.)	Yugoslavia	Verona, Italy
17:00	Salinas 84'	Report	Stojković 78', 93'	Stadium: Stadio Marc'Antonio Bentegodi; Attendance: 35,500; Referee: Aron Schmidhuber (Germany)

30 June 1990 1990 FIFA World Cup Quarter-finals	Argentina	0–0 (3–2 p)	Yugoslavia	Florence, Italy
17:00		Report		Stadium: Stadio Artemio Franchi; Attendance: 38,971; Referee: Kurt Röthlisberger (Switzerland)
	Penalties
	Serrizuela (penalty scored); Burruchaga (penalty scored); Maradona (penalty missed); Troglio (penalty missed); Dezotti (penalty scored)		(penalty missed) Stojković; (penalty scored) Prosinečki; (penalty scored) Savićević; (penalty missed) Brnović; (penalty missed) Hadžibegić

12 September 1990 UEFA Euro 1992 qualifying Group 4	Northern Ireland	0–2	Yugoslavia	Belfast, Northern Ireland
20:00		Report	Pančev 36'; Prosinečki 86'	Stadium: Windsor Park; Attendance: 9,008; Referee: Jacobus Uilenberg (Netherlands)

31 October 1990 UEFA Euro 1992 qualifying Group 4	Yugoslavia	4–1	Austria	Belgrade, Yugoslavia
19:00	Pančev 32', 52', 85'; Katanec 43'	Report	Ogris 15'	Stadium: Red Star Stadium; Attendance: 1,437; Referee: Aron Schmidhuber (Germany)

14 November 1990 UEFA Euro 1992 qualifying Group 4	Denmark	0–2	Yugoslavia	Copenhagen, Denmark
19:30		Report	Baždarević 77'; Jarni 84'	Stadium: Idrætspark; Attendance: 39,700; Referee: Neil Midgley (England)

=== 1991 ===
27 February 1991 International friendly	Turkey	1–1	Yugoslavia	İzmir, Turkey
	Tütüneker 4'	Report	Savićević 64'	Stadium: İzmir Atatürk Stadium; Attendance: 9,634; Referee: Atanas Uzunov (Bulgaria)

27 March 1991 UEFA Euro 1992 qualifying Group 4	Yugoslavia	4–1	Northern Ireland	Belgrade, Yugoslavia
17:15	Binić 35'; Pančev 47', 60', 62'	Report	Hill 44'	Stadium: Red Star Stadium; Attendance: 5,086; Referee: Yusuf Namoğlu (Turkey)

1 May 1991 UEFA Euro 1992 qualifying Group 4	Yugoslavia	1–2	Denmark	Belgrade, Yugoslavia
20:00	Pančev 50'	Report	Christensen 31', 63'	Stadium: Red Star Stadium; Attendance: 16,477; Referee: Joël Quiniou (France)

16 May 1991 UEFA Euro 1992 qualifying Group 4	Yugoslavia	7–0	Faroe Islands	Belgrade, Yugoslavia
20:00	Najdoski 21'; Prosinečki 24'; Pančev 51', 72'; Vulić 65'; Boban 68'; Šuker 85'	Report		Stadium: Red Star Stadium; Attendance: 6,745; Referee: Vassilios Nikakis (Greece)

8 August 1991 International friendly	Czechoslovakia	0–0 (4–3 p)	Yugoslavia	Aosta, Italy
		Report		Stadium: Stadio Mario Puchoz; Attendance: 500; Referee: Carlo Squizzato (Italy)
	Penalties
	Hapal (penalty scored); Juraško (penalty scored); Černý (penalty scored); Němeček (penalty scored)		(penalty scored) Mijatović; (penalty scored) Lukić; (penalty scored) Savićević; (penalty missed) Milanič; (penalty missed) Jokanović

4 September 1991 International friendly	Sweden	4–3	Yugoslavia	Stockholm, Sweden
	Dahlin 20', 69'; Limpar 53'; Thern 84'	Report	Savićević 33', 67'; Nilsson 75' (o.g.)	Stadium: Råsunda Stadium; Attendance: 11,510; Referee: Alain Delmer (France)

16 October 1991 UEFA Euro 1992 qualifying Group 4	Faroe Islands	0–2	Yugoslavia	Landskrona, Sweden
19:00		Report	Jugović 13'; Savićević 80'	Stadium: Landskrona IP; Attendance: 2,485; Referee: Günther Habermann (Germany)

30 October 1991 International friendly	Brazil	3–1	Yugoslavia	Varginha, Brazil
	Henrique 9'; Raí 45'; Müller 75'	Report	Lukić 11'	Stadium: Råsunda Stadium; Attendance: 15,000; Referee: Wilson Carlos dos Santos (Brazil)

13 November 1991 UEFA Euro 1992 qualifying Group 4	Austria	0–2	Yugoslavia	Vienna, Austria
19:30		Report	Lukić 18'; Savićević 38'	Stadium: Praterstadion; Attendance: 6,212; Referee: Pietro D'Elia (Italy)

=== 1992 ===
25 March 1992 International friendly	Netherlands	2–0	(Serbia and Montenegro) Yugoslavia	Amsterdam, Netherlands
	Kieft 64'; Wouters 68'	Report		Stadium: De Meer Stadion; Attendance: 10,500; Referee: Serge Muhmenthaler (Switzerland)
Note: Last international match as SFR Yugoslavia

== Head-to-head record ==
Yugoslavia national football team head-to-head records (1970–1992)
Opponent	Pld	W	D	L	GF	GA	GD	Pts	Confederation
Algeria	1	1	0	0	2	1	+1	3	CAF
Argentina	4	2	1	1	8	5	+3	7	CONMEBOL
Austria	6	5	1	0	15	2	+13	16	UEFA
Belgium	3	1	0	2	3	4	–1	3	UEFA
Bolivia	1	0	1	0	1	1	0	1	CONMEBOL
Brazil	7	0	4	3	5	12	–7	4	CONMEBOL
Bulgaria	5	3	1	1	7	5	+2	10	UEFA
China	1	0	1	0	1	1	0	1	AFC
Colombia	2	2	0	0	2	0	+2	6	CONMEBOL
Cyprus	4	4	0	0	14	1	+13	12	UEFA
Czechoslovakia	2	1	1	0	2	1	+1	4	UEFA
Denmark	5	3	0	2	7	9	–2	9	UEFA
East Germany	4	2	1	1	6	5	+1	7	UEFA
England	5	0	2	3	5	11	–6	2	UEFA
Faroe Islands	2	2	0	0	9	0	+9	6	UEFA
Finland	1	0	1	0	2	2	0	1	UEFA
France	7	1	3	3	5	11	–6	6	UEFA
West Germany	10	2	2	6	11	19	–8	8	UEFA
Greece	8	7	1	0	23	6	+17	22	UEFA
Honduras	1	1	0	0	1	0	+1	3	CONCACAF
Hungary	7	1	3	3	11	13	–2	6	UEFA
Iran	2	1	1	0	3	1	+2	4	AFC
Republic of Ireland	1	0	0	1	0	2	–2	0	UEFA
Italy	9	2	3	4	8	12	–4	9	UEFA
Luxembourg	6	5	1	0	14	0	+14	16	UEFA
Mexico	3	2	0	1	6	5	+1	6	CONCACAF
Netherlands	6	2	1	3	8	8	0	7	UEFA
Northern Ireland	7	5	1	1	12	3	+9	16	UEFA
Norway	6	5	0	1	12	7	+5	15	UEFA
Paraguay	1	1	0	0	2	1	+1	3	CONMEBOL
Peru	1	1	0	0	2	1	+1	3	CONMEBOL
Poland	4	1	2	1	5	5	0	5	UEFA
Portugal	1	1	0	0	3	2	+1	3	UEFA
Romania	10	5	1	4	16	15	+1	16	UEFA
Scotland	5	1	3	1	8	11	–3	6	UEFA
South Korea	1	1	0	0	3	1	+2	3	AFC
Soviet Union	8	1	1	6	5	16	–11	4	UEFA
Spain	12	5	2	5	11	11	0	17	UEFA
Sweden	4	2	0	2	9	7	+2	6	UEFA
Switzerland	2	1	0	1	2	2	0	3	UEFA
Tunisia	2	1	0	1	6	2	+4	3	CAF
Turkey	3	2	1	0	8	3	+5	7	UEFA
United Arab Emirates	1	1	0	0	4	1	+3	3	AFC
Uruguay	2	1	0	1	2	2	0	3	CONMEBOL
Venezuela	1	1	0	0	10	0	+10	3	CONMEBOL
Wales	5	2	3	0	10	7	+3	9	UEFA
Zaire	1	1	0	0	9	0	+9	3	CAF
Total	191	82	42	67	313	236	+77	288	

== See also ==
- Yugoslavia national football team results (1920–1941)
- Yugoslavia national football team results (1946–1969)
- Serbia and Montenegro national football team results
- Croatia national football team results
