= UEFA Euro 1976 qualifying Group 3 =

Football tournament qualification stage

Group 3 of the UEFA Euro 1976 qualifying tournament was one of the eight groups to decide which teams would qualify for the UEFA Euro 1976 finals tournament. Group 3 consisted of four teams: Yugoslavia, Northern Ireland, Sweden, and Norway, where they played against each other home-and-away in a round-robin format. The group winners were Yugoslavia, who finished four points above Northern Ireland and Sweden.

== Final table ==
Pos	Team	Pld	W	D	L	GF	GA	GD	Pts	Qualification	(Socialist Federal Republic of Yugoslavia)	(Northern Ireland)	(Sweden)	(Norway)
1	Yugoslavia	6	5	0	1	12	4	+8	10	Advance to quarter-finals	—	1–0	3–0	3–1
2	Northern Ireland	6	3	0	3	8	5	+3	6		1–0	—	1–2	3–0
3	Sweden	6	3	0	3	8	9	−1	6		1–2	0–2	—	3–1
4	Norway	6	1	0	5	5	15	−10	2		1–3	2–1	0–2	—

Source: UEFA
Rules for classification: Qualification tiebreakers

== Matches ==
4 September 1974
19:00

Norway	2–1	Northern Ireland
Lund 50', 72'		Finney 3'

Ullevaal, Oslo
Attendance: 7,192
Referee: Alfred Delcourt (Belgium)

30 October 1974
19:00

Yugoslavia	3–1	Norway
Vukotić 43'; Katalinski 58', 72'		Lund 36'

Stadion JNA, Belgrade
Attendance: 9,910
Referee: Antoine Queudeville (Luxembourg)

30 October 1974
19:00

Sweden	0–2	Northern Ireland
		Nicholl 7'; O'Neill 23'

Råsunda Stadion, Solna (Stockholm)
Attendance: 18,131
Referee: Theo Boosten (Netherlands)

16 April 1975
17:00

Northern Ireland	1–0	Yugoslavia
Hamilton 23'

Windsor Park, Belfast
Attendance: 25,847
Referee: Robert Wurtz (France)

4 June 1975
19:00

Sweden	1–2	Yugoslavia
Edström 16'		Katalinski 41'; Ivezić 77'

Råsunda Stadion, Solna (Stockholm)
Attendance: 27,250
Referee: Vital Loraux (Belgium)

9 June 1975
19:00

Norway	1–3	Yugoslavia
Thunberg 65'		Buljan 12'; Bogićević 13'; Šurjak 25'

Ullevaal, Oslo
Attendance: 21,843
Referee: Edgar Pedersen (Denmark)

30 June 1975
19:00

Sweden	3–1	Norway
Nordahl 33', 56'; Grahn 65' (pen.)		Olsen 54' (pen.)

Råsunda Stadion, Solna (Stockholm)
Attendance: 9,580
Referee: Rudolf Glöckner (East Germany)

13 August 1975
19:00

Norway	0–2	Sweden
		Sandberg 29'; Sjöberg 53'

Ullevaal, Oslo
Attendance: 18,011
Referee: Anders Mattsson (Finland)

3 September 1975
17:30

Northern Ireland	1–2	Sweden
Hunter 32'		Sjöberg 44'; Torstensson 55'

Windsor Park, Belfast
Attendance: 14,622
Referee: Hans-Joachim Weyland (West Germany)

15 October 1975
18:00

Yugoslavia	3–0	Sweden
Oblak 18'; Vladić 50'; Vabec 83'

Stadion Maksimir, Zagreb
Attendance: 29,836 *
Referee: Walter Hungerbühler (Switzerland)

(*)NOTE: Attendance also reported as 45,000

29 October 1975
14:30

Northern Ireland	3–0	Norway
Morgan 2'; McIlroy 5'; Hamilton 53'

Windsor Park, Belfast
Attendance: 8,923
Referee: Guðjón Finnbogason (Iceland)

19 November 1975
18:00

Yugoslavia	1–0	Northern Ireland
Oblak 21'

Stadion JNA, Belgrade
Attendance: 21,545 *
Referee: Antonio Camacho Jiménez (Spain)

(*)NOTE: Attendance also reported as 40,000

== Goalscorers ==
There were 33 goals scored in 12 matches, for an average of 2.75 goals per match.

3 goals

- (Norway) Tom Lund
- (Socialist Federal Republic of Yugoslavia) Josip Katalinski

2 goals

- (Northern Ireland) Bryan Hamilton
- (Sweden) Thomas Nordahl
- (Sweden) Thomas Sjöberg
- (Socialist Federal Republic of Yugoslavia) Branko Oblak

1 goal

- (Northern Ireland) Tommy Finney
- (Northern Ireland) Allan Hunter
- (Northern Ireland) Sammy McIlroy
- (Northern Ireland) Sammy Morgan
- (Northern Ireland) Chris Nicholl
- (Northern Ireland) Martin O'Neill
- (Norway) Erik Just Olsen
- (Norway) Stein Thunberg
- (Sweden) Ralf Edström
- (Sweden) Ove Grahn
- (Sweden) Roland Sandberg
- (Sweden) Conny Torstensson
- (Socialist Federal Republic of Yugoslavia) Vladislav Bogićević
- (Socialist Federal Republic of Yugoslavia) Ivan Buljan
- (Socialist Federal Republic of Yugoslavia) Zvonko Ivezić
- (Socialist Federal Republic of Yugoslavia) Ivica Šurjak
- (Socialist Federal Republic of Yugoslavia) Drago Vabec
- (Socialist Federal Republic of Yugoslavia) Franjo Vladić
- (Socialist Federal Republic of Yugoslavia) Momčilo Vukotić
