= UEFA Euro 1976 qualifying Group 6 =

Football tournament qualification stage

Group 6 of the UEFA Euro 1976 qualifying tournament was one of the eight groups to decide which teams would qualify for the UEFA Euro 1976 finals tournament. Group 6 consisted of four teams: Soviet Union, Republic of Ireland, Turkey, and Switzerland, where they played against each other home-and-away in a round-robin format. The group winners were the Soviet Union, who finished one point above the Republic of Ireland.

== Final table ==
Pos	Team	Pld	W	D	L	GF	GA	GD	Pts	Qualification	(Soviet Union)	(Republic of Ireland)	(Turkey)	(Switzerland)
1	Soviet Union	6	4	0	2	10	6	+4	8	Advance to quarter-finals	—	2–1	3–0	4–1
2	Republic of Ireland	6	3	1	2	11	5	+6	7		3–0	—	4–0	2–1
3	Turkey	6	2	2	2	5	10	−5	6		1–0	1–1	—	2–1
4	Switzerland	6	1	1	4	5	10	−5	3		0–1	1–0	1–1	—

Source: UEFA
Rules for classification: Qualification tiebreakers

== Matches ==
30 October 1974
15:00

Republic of Ireland	3–0	Soviet Union
Givens 22', 30', 70'

Dalymount Park, Dublin
Attendance: 31,758
Referee: Erik Axelryd (Sweden)

20 November 1974
20:00

Turkey	1–1	Republic of Ireland
Dunne 54' (o.g.)*		Givens 61'

Atatürk Stadı, İzmir
Attendance: 69,999
Referee: Marian Srodecki (Poland)

(*)NOTE: The first goal in other sources has also been reported as an own goal by Mick Martin or Terry Conroy.

1 December 1974
00:00

Turkey	2–1	Switzerland
İsmail 21'; O. Mehmet 85'		Schild 18'

Atatürk Stadı, İzmir
Attendance: 51,410
Referee: Milivoje Gugulović (Yugoslavia)

2 April 1975
19:00

Soviet Union	3–0	Turkey
Kolotov 25' (pen.), 56' (pen.); Blokhin 75'

Kyiv Central Stadium, Kyiv
Attendance: 74,223
Referee: Robert Holley Davidson (Scotland)

30 April 1975
20:15

Switzerland	1–1	Turkey
İsmail 43' (o.g.)		Alpaslan 54'

Hardturm Stadion(*), Zürich(*)
Attendance: 21,965
Referee: Riccardo Lattanzi (Italy)

(*)NOTE: Some sources state that the venue was St. Jakob-Park, Basel.

10 May 1975
15:30

Republic of Ireland	2–1	Switzerland
Martin 2'; Treacy 28'		Müller 74'

Lansdowne Road, Dublin
Attendance: 48,074
Referee: Paul Schiller (Austria)

18 May 1975
19:30

Soviet Union	2–1	Republic of Ireland
Blokhin 13'; Kolotov 29'		Hand 79'

Kyiv Central Stadium, Kyiv
Attendance: 84,480
Referee: René Vigliani (France)

21 May 1975
20:00

Switzerland	1–0	Republic of Ireland
Elsener 75'

Wankdorf Stadion, Bern
Attendance: 12,793
Referee: César da Luz Diaz Correia (Portugal)

12 October 1975
15:00

Switzerland	0–1	Soviet Union
		Muntyan 78'

Hardturm Stadion, Zürich
Attendance: 17,887
Referee: Leonardus van der Kroft (Netherlands)

29 October 1975
15:00

Republic of Ireland	4–0	Turkey
Givens 26', 33', 38', 89'

Dalymount Park, Dublin
Attendance: 16,533
Referee: Ángel Franco Martínez (Spain)

12 November 1975
19:00

Soviet Union	4–1	Switzerland
Konkov 13'; Onishchenko 14', 68'; Veremeyev 81'		Risi 45'

Kyiv Central Stadium, Kyiv
Attendance: 24,581
Referee: Klaus Ohmsen (West Germany)

23 November 1975
15:00 (Note: The Turkey v Soviet Union match was delayed by 30 minutes due to adverse weather conditions.)

Turkey	1–0	Soviet Union
Reshko 22' (o.g.)**

Atatürk Stadı, İzmir
Attendance: 21,325 *
Referee: Petar Nikolov (Bulgaria)

(*)NOTE: Attendance also reported as 45,000
(**)NOTE: The own goal scorer has also been reported as Mikhail Fomenko.

== Goalscorers ==
There were 31 goals scored in 12 matches, for an average of 2.58 goals per match.

8 goals

- (Republic of Ireland national football team) Don Givens

3 goals

- (Soviet Union national football team) Viktor Kolotov

2 goals

- (Soviet Union national football team) Oleg Blokhin
- (Soviet Union national football team) Volodymyr Onyshchenko

1 goal

- (Republic of Ireland national football team) Eoin Hand
- (Republic of Ireland national football team) Mick Martin
- (Republic of Ireland national football team) Ray Treacy
- (Soviet Union national football team) Anatoliy Konkov
- (Soviet Union national football team) Vladimir Muntyan
- (Soviet Union national football team) Volodymyr Veremeyev
- (Switzerland national football team) Rudolf Elsener
- (Switzerland national football team) Kurt Müller
- (Switzerland national football team) Peter Risi
- (Switzerland national football team) Hanspeter Schild
- (Turkey national football team) İsmail Arca
- (Turkey national football team) Alpaslan Eratlı
- (Turkey national football team) Mehmet Oğuz

1 own goal

- (Republic of Ireland national football team) Tony Dunne (against Turkey)
- (Soviet Union national football team) Stefan Reshko (against Turkey)
- (Turkey national football team) İsmail Arca (against Switzerland)
