= Belgium–France football rivalry =

Football rivalry between the national football teams of Belgium and France

- Location: Europe
- Teams: Belgium; France
- First meeting: 1 May 1904 (Uccle, Belgium); Évence Coppée Trophy; Belgium 3–3 France
- Latest meeting: 5 October 2026 (Saint-Denis, France); UEFA Nations League; France 4–1 Belgium

Statistics
- Total meetings: 80
- Most wins: France (31)
- Top scorer: Kylian Mbappé (5 goals)
- All-time series: Belgium: 30; Draw: 19; France: 31
- Largest victory: Belgium 7–0 France; Friendly; 7 May 1905

The football rivalry between Belgium and France is one of the oldest association football rivalries in Europe, dating back the first official match for both teams and the first official football match between independent countries on the European continent in 1904. The rivalry has been dubbed le Match Sympathique in French ("the Friendly Match"); with French journalist Vincent Duluc calling the encounters "both a neighborhood block party and a deep-seated rivalry" and that "the great elders report that France-Belgium is the mother of all battles."

== Background ==
The two sides met on 1 May 1904 for the first official match between them, although in practice unofficial matches had already taken place on both sides of the border. Until the early 1970s, the two national teams met annually for a friendly match.

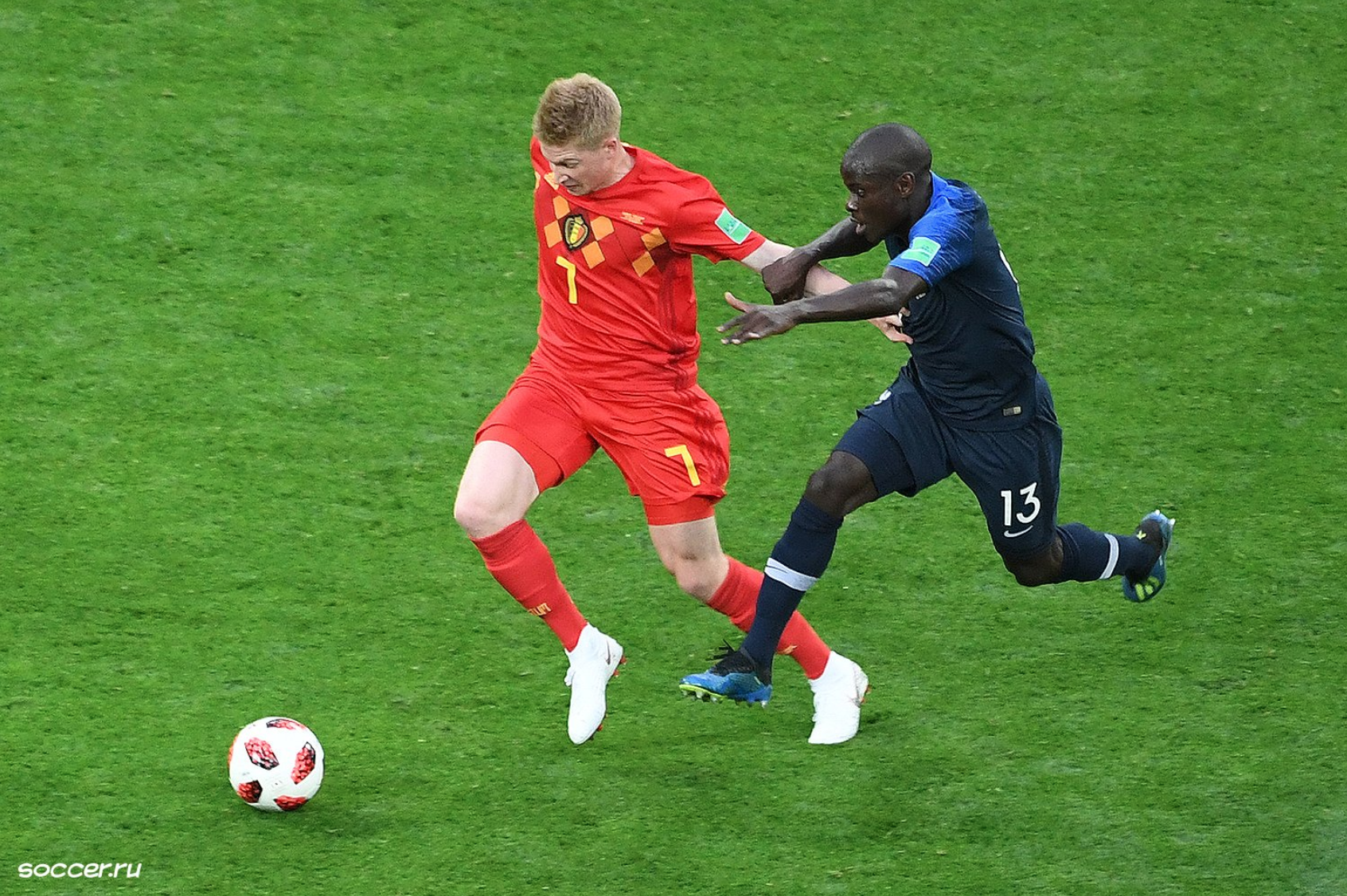
Belgium's Kevin De Bruyne and France's N'Golo Kanté during the 2018 FIFA World Cup semi-final encounter.

In major tournaments, the two sides met three times in the World Cup, all French victories. The sides have also met four times in World Cup Qualifiers (1958 and 1982). The sides met twice in the European Championship, both during the knockout stage, and both ended in French victories. In qualifying, the sides met twice for Euro 1968 and Euro 1976.

The sides met in the semi-finals of the 2021 UEFA Nations League Finals, with France prevailing 3–2 after overcoming a two-goal deficit.

France has won each of the last seven meetings.

== Comparison in major tournaments ==
Key

Denotes which team finished better in that particular competition.
DNQ: Did not qualify.
DNP: Did not participate.
TBD: To be determined.

Tournament	Belgium	France	Notes
1930 FIFA World Cup	11th	7th	
1934 FIFA World Cup	15th	9th	
1938 FIFA World Cup	13th	6th	Tournament hosted by France. In the second round, France defeated Belgium 3-1.
1950 FIFA World Cup	Withdrew	DNQ	
1954 FIFA World Cup	12th	11th	
1958 FIFA World Cup	DNQ	3rd	
Euro 1960	DNQ	4th	Tournament hosted by France.
1962 FIFA World Cup	DNQ		
Euro 1964	DNQ		
1966 FIFA World Cup	DNQ	13th	
Euro 1968	DNQ		
1970 FIFA World Cup	10th	DNQ	
Euro 1972	3rd	DNQ	Tournament hosted by Belgium.
1974 FIFA World Cup	DNQ		
Euro 1976	DNQ		
1978 FIFA World Cup	DNQ	12th	
Euro 1980	2nd	DNQ	
1982 FIFA World Cup	10th	4th	
Euro 1984	7th	1st	Tournament hosted by France. In the group stage, France defeated Belgium 5–0.
1986 FIFA World Cup	4th	3rd	In the third place match, France defeated Belgium 4–2.
Euro 1988	DNQ		
1990 FIFA World Cup	11th	DNQ	
Euro 1992	DNQ	6th	
1994 FIFA World Cup	11th	DNQ	
Euro 1996	DNQ	3rd	
1998 FIFA World Cup	19th	1st	Tournament hosted by France.
Euro 2000	12th	1st	Tournament jointly hosted by Belgium and the Netherlands.
2002 FIFA World Cup	14th	28th	
Euro 2004	DNQ	6th	
2006 FIFA World Cup	DNQ	2nd	
Euro 2008	DNQ	15th	
2010 FIFA World Cup	DNQ	29th	
Euro 2012	DNQ	8th	
2014 FIFA World Cup	6th	7th	
Euro 2016	6th	2nd	Tournament hosted by France.
2018 FIFA World Cup	3rd	1st	In the semifinals, France defeated Belgium 1–0.
Euro 2020	5th	11th	
2022 FIFA World Cup	23rd	2nd	
Euro 2024	10th	3rd	In the Round of 16, France defeated Belgium 1–0.
2026 FIFA World Cup	6th	4th	
Euro 2028	TBD	TBD	

== Major encounters ==
=== 1938 FIFA World Cup ===
5 June 1938
17:00 WEST (UTC+01:00)

France	3–1	Belgium
Veinante 1'; Nicolas 16', 69'		Isemborghs 38'

Stade Olympique de Colombes, Colombes
Attendance: 30,454
Referee: Hans Wüthrich (Switzerland)

=== UEFA Euro 1984 ===
16 June 1984
17:15

France	5–0	Belgium
Platini 4', 74' (pen.), 89'; Giresse 33'; Fernández 43'	Report

Stade de la Beaujoire, Nantes
Attendance: 51,359
Referee: Bob Valentine (Scotland)

=== 1986 FIFA World Cup ===
28 June 1986
12:00 CST

Belgium	2–4 (a.e.t.)	France
Ceulemans 11'; Claesen 73'		Ferreri 27'; Papin 43'; Genghini 104'; Amoros 111' (pen.)

Estadio Cuauhtémoc, Puebla
Attendance: 21,000
Referee: George Courtney (England)

=== 2018 FIFA World Cup ===
10 July 2018
21:00 MSK (UTC+3)

France	1–0	Belgium
Umtiti 51'

Krestovsky Stadium, Saint Petersburg
Attendance: 64,286
Referee: Andrés Cunha (Uruguay)

=== 2021 UEFA Nations League Finals ===
7 October 2021
20:45

Belgium	2–3	France
Carrasco 37'; Lukaku 40'	Report	Benzema 62'; Mbappé 69' (pen.); T. Hernandez 90'

Juventus Stadium, Turin
Attendance: 12,409
Referee: Daniel Siebert (Germany)

=== UEFA Euro 2024 ===
1 July 2024
18:00

France	1–0	Belgium
Vertonghen 85' (o.g.)	Report

Merkur Spiel-Arena, Düsseldorf
Attendance: 46,810
Referee: Glenn Nyberg (Sweden)

== Matches ==
No.	Date	Location	Competition	Result		
–	23 September 1900	(France) Paris	1900 Olympics (Demonstration tournament)	(France) Club Français	6–2	(Belgium) Université de Bruxelles
1	1 May 1904	(Belgium) Brussels	Friendly	Belgium	3–3	France
2	7 May 1905	(Belgium) Brussels	Friendly	Belgium	7–0	France
3	22 April 1906	(France) Saint-Cloud	Friendly	France	0–5	Belgium
4	21 April 1907	(Belgium) Brussels	Friendly	Belgium	1–2	France
5	12 April 1908	(France) Colombes	Friendly	France	1–2	Belgium
6	9 May 1909	(Belgium) Brussels	Friendly	Belgium	5–0	France
7	3 April 1910	(France) Gentilly	Friendly	France	0–4	Belgium
8	30 April 1911	(Belgium) Brussels	Friendly	Belgium	7–1	France
9	28 January 1912	(France) Saint-Ouen	Friendly	France	1–1	Belgium
10	16 February 1913	(Belgium) Brussels	Friendly	Belgium	3–0	France
11	25 January 1914	(France) Lille	Friendly	France	4–3	Belgium
12	9 March 1919	(Belgium) Brussels	Friendly	Belgium	2–2	France
13	28 March 1920	(France) Paris	Friendly	France	2–1	Belgium
14	6 March 1921	(Belgium) Brussels	Friendly	Belgium	3–1	France
15	15 January 1922	(France) Colombes	Friendly	France	2–1	Belgium
16	25 February 1923	(Belgium) Brussels	Friendly	Belgium	4–1	France
17	13 January 1924	(France) Paris	Friendly	France	2–0	Belgium
18	11 November 1924	(Belgium) Sint-Jans-Molenbeek	Friendly	Belgium	3–0	France
19	11 April 1926	(France) Paris	Friendly	France	4–3	Belgium
20	20 June 1926	(Belgium) Sint-Jans-Molenbeek	Friendly	Belgium	2–2	France
21	15 April 1928	(France) Colombes	Friendly	France	2–3	Belgium
22	26 May 1929	(Belgium) Rocourt	Friendly	Belgium	4–1	France
23	13 April 1930	(France) Colombes	Friendly	France	1–6	Belgium
24	25 May 1930	(Belgium) Ougrée	Friendly	Belgium	1–2	France
25	7 December 1930	(France) Montrouge	Friendly	France	2–2	Belgium
26	1 May 1932	(Belgium) Brussels	Friendly	Belgium	5–2	France
27	26 May 1933	(France) Colombes	Friendly	France	3–0	Belgium
28	21 January 1934	(Belgium) Brussels	Friendly	Belgium	2–3	France
29	14 April 1935	(Belgium) Brussels	Friendly	Belgium	1–1	France
30	8 March 1936	(France) Colombes	Friendly	France	3–0	Belgium
31	21 February 1937	(Belgium) Brussels	Friendly	Belgium	3–1	France
32	30 January 1938	(France) Paris	Friendly	France	5–3	Belgium
33	5 June 1938	(France) Paris	1938 FIFA World Cup	France	3–1	Belgium
34	18 May 1939	(Belgium) Brussels	Friendly	Belgium	2–3	France
35	24 December 1944	(France) Paris	Friendly	France	3–1	Belgium
36	15 December 1945	(Belgium) Brussels	Friendly	Belgium	2–1	France
37	1 June 1947	(France) Colombes	Friendly	France	4–2	Belgium
38	6 June 1948	(Belgium) Brussels	Friendly	Belgium	4–2	France
39	17 October 1948	(France) Colombes	Friendly	France	3–3	Belgium
40	4 June 1950	(Belgium) Brussels	Friendly	Belgium	4–1	France
41	1 November 1950	(France) Colombes	Friendly	France	3–3	Belgium
42	22 May 1952	(Belgium) Brussels	Friendly	Belgium	1–2	France
43	25 December 1952	(France) Colombes	Friendly	France	0–1	Belgium
44	30 May 1954	(Belgium) Brussels	Friendly	Belgium	3–3	France
45	11 November 1954	(France) Colombes	Friendly	France	2–2	Belgium
46	25 December 1955	(Belgium) Brussels	Friendly	Belgium	2–1	France
47	11 November 1956	(France) Colombes	1958 FIFA World Cup qualification	France	6–3	Belgium
48	27 October 1957	(Belgium) Brussels	1958 FIFA World Cup qualification	Belgium	0–0	France
49	1 March 1959	(France) Colombes	Friendly	France	2–2	Belgium
50	28 February 1960	(Belgium) Brussels	Friendly	Belgium	1–0	France
51	15 March 1961	(France) Colombes	Friendly	France	1–1	Belgium
52	18 October 1961	(Belgium) Brussels	Friendly	Belgium	3–0	France
53	25 December 1963	(France) Colombes	Friendly	France	1–2	Belgium
54	2 December 1964	(Belgium) Brussels	Friendly	Belgium	3–0	France
55	20 April 1966	(France) Colombes	Friendly	France	0–3	Belgium
56	11 November 1966	(Belgium) Brussels	UEFA Euro 1968 qualification	Belgium	2–1	France
57	28 October 1967	(France) Nantes	UEFA Euro 1968 qualification	France	1–1	Belgium
58	15 November 1970	(Belgium) Brussels	Friendly	Belgium	1–2	France
59	12 October 1974	(Belgium) Brussels	UEFA Euro 1976 qualification	Belgium	2–1	France
60	15 November 1975	(France) Paris	UEFA Euro 1976 qualification	France	1–1	Belgium
61	29 April 1981	(France) Paris	1982 FIFA World Cup qualification	France	3–2	Belgium
62	9 September 1981	(Belgium) Brussels	1982 FIFA World Cup qualification	Belgium	2–0	France
63	31 May 1983	Luxembourg City	Friendly	France	1–1	Belgium
64	16 June 1984	(France) Nantes	UEFA Euro 1984	France	5–0	Belgium
65	16 June 1986	(Mexico) Puebla	1986 FIFA World Cup	Belgium	2–4 (a.e.t.)	France
66	25 March 1992	(France) Paris	Friendly	France	3–3	Belgium
67	27 March 1996	(Belgium) Brussels	Friendly	Belgium	0–2	France
68	27 May 1998	(Morocco) Casablanca	Hassan II Trophy	France	1–0	Belgium
69	18 May 2002	(France) Saint-Denis	Friendly	France	1–2	Belgium
70	18 February 2004	(Belgium) Brussels	Friendly	Belgium	0–2	France
71	15 November 2011	(France) Saint-Denis	Friendly	France	0–0	Belgium
72	14 August 2013	(Belgium) Brussels	Friendly	Belgium	0–0	France
73	7 June 2015	(France) Saint-Denis	Friendly	France	3–4	Belgium
74	10 July 2018	(Russia) Saint Petersburg	2018 FIFA World Cup	France	1–0	Belgium
75	7 October 2021	(Italy) Turin	2021 UEFA Nations League Finals	Belgium	2–3	France
76	1 July 2024	(Germany) Düsseldorf	UEFA Euro 2024	France	1–0	Belgium
77	9 September 2024	(France) Décines-Charpieu	2024–25 UEFA Nations League	France	2–0	Belgium
78	14 October 2024	(Belgium) Brussels	2024–25 UEFA Nations League	Belgium	1–2	France
79	28 September 2026	(Belgium) Brussels	2026–27 UEFA Nations League	Belgium	0–1	France
80	5 October 2026	(France) Saint-Denis	2026–27 UEFA Nations League	France	4–1	Belgium
