= Tibor Wollek =

Hungarian footballer (1947–2004)

Personal information
- Date of birth: October 7, 1947
- Place of birth: Budapest, Hungary
- Date of death: October 2, 2004 (aged 56)
- Place of death: Székesfehérvár, Fejér, Hungary
- Position: Forward

Youth career
- ???–1968: Erzsébeti VTK

Senior career*
Years	Team	Apps	(Gls)
1968	Kossuth KFSE		
1969–1977	Videoton	202	(65)

International career
1975	Hungary	1	(1)
- * Club domestic league appearances and goals

Tibor Wollek (October 7, 1947 – October 2, 2004) was a Hungarian footballer. He played as a forward for Videoton throughout the 1970s, becoming the club's second top scorer during the 1975–76 Nemzeti Bajnokság I. He also briefly represented his home country of Hungary in 1975 during the EUFA Euro 1976 qualifiers.

== Club career ==
Until 1968 he played for Erzsébeti VTK in Budapest throughout his youth career. In 1968, during his debut as a senior player, he played for Kossuth KFSE. Subsequently, in 1969, he moved to Székesfehérvár to play for Videoton. He would produce many goals for the team throughout his career, scoring three goals against Újpest Dósza in a 3–2 victory in 1973. His best result with the team was during the 1975–76 Nemzeti Bajnokság I with the club achieving runners-up and Wollek being the second highest goal scorer for the team that season. By 1977, he had appeared in 202 league games and scored 65 goals.

== International career ==
Wollek would make his only appearance internationally during the EUFA Euro 1976 qualifiers match against Luxembourg on October 19, 1975. He came in as a substitute for László Nagy in the 39th minute and scored in the 78th minute in a 8–1 victory.

Wollek died on October 2, 2004, at Székesfehérvár. An annual children's football tournament at Kisfalud was held in his honor beginning in 2011.
