= Alfredo Megido =

Spanish footballer

Personal information
- Full name: Alfredo Megido Sánchez
- Date of birth: 2 October 1952 (age 74)
- Place of birth: Peñaflor, Spain
- Height: 1.73 m (5 ft 8 in)
- Position: Forward

Senior career*
Years	Team	Apps	(Gls)
1970–1971	Sporting Gijón B		
1971–1975	Sporting Gijón	107	(19)
1975–1976	Granada	32	(5)
1976–1979	Betis	48	(7)
1977–1978	→ Bordeaux (loan)	16	(5)
1979–1980	Málaga	30	(8)
1980–1983	Hércules	40	(5)
Total		273	(49)

International career
1972–1974	Spain amateur	4	(0)
1975	Spain	1	(1)
- * Club domestic league appearances and goals

Alfredo Megido Sánchez (born 2 October 1952), also known simply as Megido, is a Spanish former footballer who played as a forward and made one appearance for the Spain national team.

== Career ==
Megido made his only appearance for Spain on 5 February 1975 in a UEFA Euro 1976 qualifying match against Scotland, which finished as a 1–1 draw. He scored the equalising goal for Spain in the 67th minute, after having just been substituted on a minute prior.

== Career statistics ==
=== International ===
Spain
Year	Apps	Goals
1975	1	1
Total	1	1

=== International goals ===
No.	Date	Venue	Opponent	Score	Result	Competition
1	5 February 1975	Estadio Luis Casanova, Valencia, Spain	Scotland	1–1	1–1	UEFA Euro 1976 qualifying
