= Jozef Móder =

Slovak footballer and coach

Personal information
- Date of birth: 19 September 1947 (age 79)
- Place of birth: Tvrdošovce, Czechoslovakia
- Position: Midfielder

Youth career
- 1960–1965: Družstevník Tvrdošovce

Senior career*
| Years | Team | Apps | (Gls) |
| 1966–1967 | Inter Bratislava | 1 | (0) |
| 1967–1971 | Lokomotíva Košice | 106 | (25) |
| 1971–1973 | Dukla Praha | 55 | (14) |
| 1973–1980 | Lokomotíva Košice | | |
| 1980–1982 | Grazer AK | 60 | (9) |
| 1982–1983 | Lokomotíva Košice | 18 | (2) |

International career
| 1972–1977 | Czechoslovakia | 17 | (3) |
Medal record
Representing Czechoslovakia
UEFA European Championship
| Winner | 1976 Yugoslavia |
- * Club domestic league appearances and goals

Jozef Móder (born 19 September 1947) is a former Slovak football midfielder and later coach. He is a member of the Czechoslovakia winning team at the UEFA Euro 1976. He was known as a corner kick specialist.

Overall, he played 318 matches and scored 75 goals in the Czechoslovak First League.

Móder made his international debut for the Czechoslovakia national football team in a 6-0 home win against Luxembourg on 26 April 1972. He scored three goals in the UEFA Euro 1976 qualifying quarter-final against Soviet Union, helping Czechoslovakia to progress to the final tournament.

== Honours ==
- UEFA European Football Championship

- Champions: 1976

- Czechoslovak Cup

- 1977, 1979

- Austrian Cup

- 1981
