= İsmail Arca =

Turkish footballer and manager

Personal information
- Full name: İsmail Arca
- Date of birth: 5 September 1948 (age 78)
- Place of birth: İnegöl, Turkey
- Height: 1.80 m (5 ft 11 in)
- Position: Defender

Youth career
- 1962–1964: İnegöl İdman Yurdu
- 1964–1965: Eskisehir Fatihspor

Senior career*
| Years | Team | Apps | (Gls) |
| 1965–1982 | Eskişehirspor | 418 | (10) |

International career^{‡}
| 1961–1966 | Turkey U18 | 4 | (0) |
| 1967–1970 | Turkey U21 | 6 | (0) |
| 1968–1977 | Turkey | 27 | (0) |
| 1979 | Turkey B | 5 | (0) |

Managerial career
- 1990–1991: İnegölspor
- 1991: Eskişehirspor
- 1991–1995: İnegölspor
- 1996–1997: İskenderunspor
- 1998–2002: Eskişehirspor (Technical Director)
- * Club domestic league appearances and goals as of 3 April 2018 ‡ National team caps and goals as of 3 April 2018

İsmail Arca (born 5 September 1948) is a Turkish former football player, who played as a defender, and manager. He spent his entire professional career with Eskişehirspor, and is known by his nickname Büyük Kaptan (Turkish, "Great Captain").

== Professional career ==
Arca begun playing football with İnegöl İdman Yurdu in 1962, and in 1964 moved to Eskisehir Fatihspor where he attended his local highschool. He moved to Eskişehirspor in 1965, and remained in the team for 17 years, becoming their captain. Arca holds the record for most official caps with Eskişehirspor, with 542 official appearances across all competitions.

== International career ==
An international footballer for Turkey, Arca scored his only international goal in a 2–1 UEFA Euro 1976 qualifying win over Switzerland on 1 December 1974.

== Honours ==
Eskişehirspor

- Prime Minister's Cup (1): 1965–1966
- TFF First League (1): 1965–1966
- Turkish Cup (1): 1970–71
- Turkish Super Cup (1): 1970–71

Turkey national football team

- ECO Cup (1): 1974
