= Thomas Nordahl =

Swedish footballer and sportscaster (born 1946)

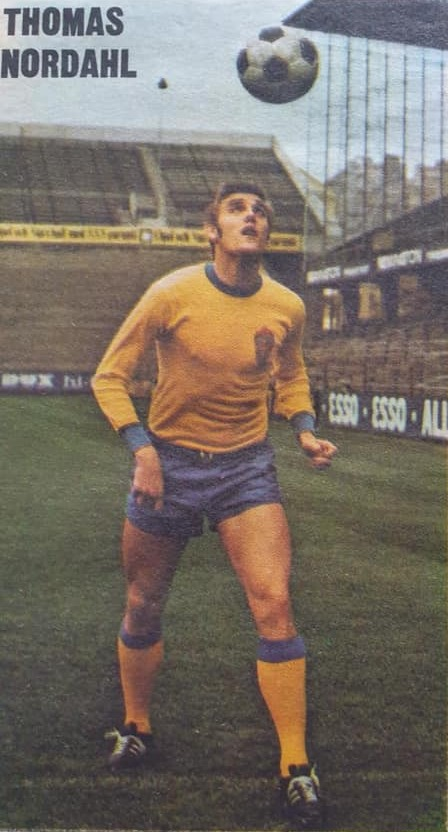
- Nordahl in 1970

Personal information
- Full name: Thomas Gunnar Nordahl
- Date of birth: 24 May 1946 (age 80)
- Place of birth: Norrköping, Sweden
- Position: Forward

Senior career*
Years	Team	Apps	(Gls)
1964	Degerfors	14	(4)
1965–1968	Örebro	77	(41)
1968–1971	Juventus	0	(0)
1968–1971	→ Anderlecht (loan)	75	(26)
1971–1978	Örebro	175	(55)
1979–1980	BK Forward	45	(21)
Total		386	(157)

International career
1964	Sweden U19	8	(0)
1965–1967	Sweden U21	7	(6)
1967–1975	Sweden	15	(5)

Managerial career
- BK Forward
- 1981–1984: Sandvikens IF
- 1985: IK Grand Bodø
- Motala AIF
- 1995: IFK Norrköping
- * Club domestic league appearances and goals

Thomas Gunnar Nordahl (born 24 May 1946) is a Swedish former professional footballer who played as a forward. He is also a former manager.

He played his club football for Degerfors IF, Örebro SK, R.S.C. Anderlecht, and BK Forward during a career that spanned between 1964 and 1980. A full international between 1967 and 1975, he won 15 caps and scored 5 goals for the Sweden national team. He represented Sweden at the 1970 FIFA World Cup. After his playing career he worked as a manager with BK Forward, Sandvikens IF, Motala AIF, and IFK Norrköping.

He is the son of former professional footballer Gunnar Nordahl.

== Club career ==
Nordahl made his debut in the Allsvenskan in 1964 for Degerfors IF when he was 17 years old. A year later, he moved to Örebro SK and became a key player there. He played 77 matches for the Swedish side and scored 41 goals. 1968 he moved to the Italian club Juventus, who had finished third in Serie A during the 1967–68 season. However, shortly after Nordahl signed the contract, the Serie A issued a ban which stopped all clubs from bringing in foreign players. Nordahl was contracted with Juventus but couldn't play because of this ban. This forced Juventus to loan him out to Belgian side R.S.C. Anderlecht. Nordahl stayed in Anderlecht for three years, until 1971; after those three years, his contract with Juventus ended, but the ban still had not been lifted. Nordahl left the club without playing a match for them and went to his old club Örebro. He played there for 7 years between 1971 and 1978, making 175 appearances and scoring 65 goals, resulting in a total of 252 appearances and 106 goals for the club. In 1979 (the season began 1980) he went to another Swedish club, BK Forward, and played 45 matches and scored 21 goals. In 1980, an injury forced Nordahl to quit playing football and the age of 34.

== International career ==
Nordahl made 15 international appearances for the Sweden national team between 1967 and 1975, and scored 5 goals. He also made 15 appearances for the Swedish youth teams. Nordahl was included in the Swedish squad for the 1970 FIFA World Cup in Mexico.

== Coaching career ==
Following his retirement from professional football, Nordahl went on to coach a number of Swedish clubs, including BK Forward, Sandvikens IF, Motala AIF, and IFK Norrköping.

== Career statistics ==
=== International ===
Appearances and goals by national team and year
National team	Year	Apps	Goals
Sweden	1967	1	1
Sweden	1968	5	2
Sweden	1969	1	0
Sweden	1970	2	0
Sweden	1971	1	0
Sweden	1972	0	0
Sweden	1973	0	0
Sweden	1974	2	0
Sweden	1975	3	2
Total		15	5

Scores and results list Sweden's goal tally first, score column indicates score after each Nordahl goal.

List of international goals scored by Thomas Nordahl
No.	Date	Venue	Opponent	Score	Result	Competition	Ref.
1	3 September 1967	Ullevaal Stadium, Oslo, Norway	Norway	1–0	1–3	UEFA Euro 1968 qualifying	
2	2 May 1968	Malmö Stadium, Malmö, Sweden	Spain	1–0	1–1	Friendly	
3	27 June 1968	Råsunda Stadium, Solna, Sweden	Denmark	2–1	2–1	1968–71 Nordic Football Championship	
4	30 June 1975	Råsunda Stadium, Solna, Sweden	Norway	1–0	3–1	UEFA Euro 1976 qualifying	
5	30 June 1975	Råsunda Stadium, Solna, Sweden	Norway	2–1	3–1	UEFA Euro 1976 qualifying	

== Honours ==
RSC Anderlecht

- Belgian First Division: 1967–68
- Inter-Cities Fairs Cup: 1969-70 (runners-up)

Individual

- Stor Grabb: 1975
