= Hanspeter Schild =

Swiss footballer (born 1950)

Personal information
- Full name: Hanspeter Schild
- Date of birth: 21 April 1950 (age 76)
- Place of birth: Switzerland
- Position: Midfielder

Senior career*
Years	Team	Apps	(Gls)
1969–1976	Young Boys	138	(45)
Total		138	(45)

International career
1973–1975	Switzerland	10	(2)
- * Club domestic league appearances and goals

Hanspeter Schild (born 21 April 1950) is a Swiss former footballer who played as a midfielder and made ten appearances for the Switzerland national team and scored two career goals.

== Career ==
Schild made his debut for Switzerland on 20 October 1973 in a 1974 FIFA World Cup qualification match against Italy, which finished as a 0–2 loss. He went on to make ten appearances, scoring two goals, before making his last appearance on 3 September 1975 in a friendly match against England, which finished as a 1–2 loss.

== Career statistics ==
=== International ===
Switzerland
Year	Apps	Goals
1973	1	0
1974	6	2
1975	3	0
Total	10	2

=== International goals ===
No.	Date	Venue	Opponent	Score	Result	Competition
1	13 November 1974	Wankdorf Stadium, Bern, Switzerland	Portugal	3–0	3–0	Friendly
2	1 December 1974	Atatürk Stadı, İzmir, Turkey	Turkey	1–0	1–2	UEFA Euro 1976 qualifying
