= Jacques Teugels =

Belgian footballer (1946–2024)

- Teugels for Racing White in 1973

Personal information
- Date of birth: 3 August 1946
- Place of birth: Ixelles, Belgium
- Date of death: 28 September 2024 (aged 78)
- Position: Forward

Senior career*
Years	Team	Apps	(Gls)
1966–1968	Anderlecht		
1968–1971	Union Saint-Gilloise		
1973–1973	Racing White		
1973–1977	RWD Molenbeek		
1977–1979	La Louviére		

International career
1970–1976	Belgium	13	(1)
- * Club domestic league appearances and goals

Jacques Teugels (3 August 1946 – 28 September 2024) was a Belgian footballer who played as a forward.

Teugels was born in Ixelles on 3 August 1946. He played at club level mainly for R.W.D. Molenbeek, after spells at Anderlecht and Union Saint-Gilloise. To this day, he is the only footballer to have played for all three major clubs in Brussels. Because of his physical condition and his powerful shots with his left foot, Teugels was nicknamed ‘Dynamite Jack’.

At international level, Teugels earned 13 caps for the Belgium national team, and participated in UEFA Euro 1972. Teugels died on 28 September 2024, at the age of 78.

== Honours ==
=== Player ===
Anderlecht

- Belgian First Division: 1966–67, 1967–68
- Toulon Tournament: 1967

RWD Molenbeek

- Belgian First Division: 1974–75
- Jules Pappaert Cup: 1975
- Amsterdam Tournament: 1975

Belgium

- UEFA European Championship third place: 1972
