= Erik Just-Olsen =

Norwegian footballer (born 1946)

Personal information
- Date of birth: 20 March 1946 (age 80)

International career
Years	Team	Apps	(Gls)
1975	Norway	3	(1)

Erik Just-Olsen (born 20 March 1946) is a Norwegian footballer. He played in three matches for the Norway national football team in 1975.
