= Jean-Marc Guillou =

French football coach and former player (born 1945)

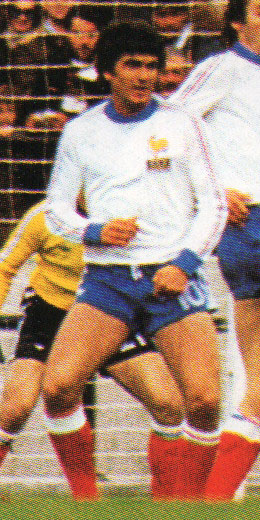
- Guillou playing for France in 1978 World Cup

Personal information
- Date of birth: 20 December 1945 (age 80)
- Place of birth: Bouaye, France
- Height: 1.74 m (5 ft 9 in)
- Position: Midfielder

Youth career
- 1958–1965: Sporting Club Nazairien

Senior career*
| Years | Team | Apps | (Gls) |
| 1966–1975 | Angers | 243 | (18) |
| 1975–1979 | Nice | 136 | (12) |
| 1979–1981 | Neuchâtel Xamax | 49 | (1) |
| 1981–1983 | Mulhouse | 62 | (0) |
| 1983–1984 | Cannes | 11 | (0) |
| Total | | 501 | (31) |

International career
| 1974–1978 | France | 19 | (3) |

Managerial career
- 1976–1977: Nice
- 1980–1981: Neuchâtel Xamax
- 1981–1983: Mulhouse
- 1983–1985: Cannes
- 1985–1986: Servette
- 1993–2000: ASEC Mimosas
- 1999–2000: Ivory Coast
- 2001–2002: Beveren
- * Club domestic league appearances and goals

Jean-Marc Guillou (born 20 December 1945) is a French football coach and former player, who played at the 1978 World Cup.

== Club career ==
Guillou was born in Bouaye, Loire-Atlantique. He played for Angers SCO, OGC Nice, Neuchâtel Xamax, FC Mulhouse, and AS Cannes.

== International career ==
Guillou made his debut for the France national team in March 1974 in a match against Romania, which France won 1–0. Between 1974 and 1978 he played 19 times for the French national side, including at the 1978 World Cup in Argentina.

He played his last match for France at the 1978 World Cup losing to Italy 2–1 on 2 June in Mar del Plata.

== Post-playing career ==
Guillou gave former Arsenal manager Arsène Wenger his first break in coaching by appointing him as his assistant at AS Cannes in 1983.

Guillou was the founder of the Abidjan football school Académie de Sol Beni, eventually becoming the manager, technical director and coach at ASEC Abidjan. He currently runs a number of football schools in Africa and Thailand under the name Académie Jean-Marc Guillou (Academy J.M.G.) seeking to develop young footballers who are often transferred to European clubs, the football talent academies are based in Abidjan, Antsika, Algiers and Bangkok.

== Honours ==
Angers

- Championnat de France de football: 1969
