= Matthías Hallgrímsson =

Icelandic footballer

Personal information
- Date of birth: 12 December 1946 (age 79)
- Position: Striker

Senior career*
Years	Team	Apps	(Gls)
1965–1976	ÍA		
1976–1977	Halmia		
1978–1979	ÍA		
1980–1981	Valur		

International career
1968–1978	Iceland	45	(11)
- * Club domestic league appearances and goals

Matthías Hallgrímsson (born 12 December 1946) is an Icelandic former footballer who played as a striker.

== Club career ==
Matthías played club football in Iceland and Sweden for ÍA, Halmia and Valur. He was topscorer in the Úrvalsdeild in the 1969 and 1975 seasons.

== International career ==
Matthías scored 11 goals in 45 appearances for the Iceland national team. 4 of those appearances came in FIFA World Cup qualifying matches.
