= Jean Gallice =

French footballer (born 1949)

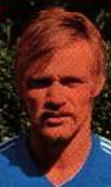
- Gallice with Bordeaux in the 1975–76 season

Personal information
- Date of birth: 13 May 1949 (age 77)
- Place of birth: Bordeaux, France
- Position: Midfielder

Senior career*
| Years | Team | Apps | (Gls) |
| 1969–1971 | Angoulême | | |
| 1971–1977 | Bordeaux | | |
| 1977–1979 | Lyon | | |
| 1979–1980 | RC Besançon | | |
| 1980–1984 | Libourne | | |

International career
| 1974–1976 | France | 7 | (1) |
- * Club domestic league appearances and goals

Jean Gallice (born 13 May 1949 in Bordeaux) is a French former professional football (soccer) player.
