= Ian Evans (footballer) =

Welsh footballer and manager

Personal information
- Date of birth: 30 January 1952 (age 74)
- Place of birth: Egham, England
- Height: 6 ft 2 in (1.88 m)
- Position: Defender

Senior career*
Years	Team	Apps	(Gls)
1970–1974	Queens Park Rangers	39	(2)
1974–1979	Crystal Palace	137	(14)
1979–1983	Barnsley	102	(3)
1983–1984	→ Exeter City (loan)	4	(0)
1984	→ Cambridge United (loan)	1	(0)

International career
1975–1977	Wales	13	(1)

Managerial career
- 1989–1990: Swansea City
- * Club domestic league appearances and goals

Ian Evans (born 30 January 1952) is a Welsh former professional footballer and Wales international.

== Career ==
His first club was Queens Park Rangers and in September 1974 joined Crystal Palace, where he quickly became a firm favourite with the club's supporters. In October 1977 he sustained an injury in a tackle by George Best, playing for Fulham, which kept him out for over two years. In his time at Palace he played 163 games, scoring 16 goals and was capped 13 times for Wales. Other clubs included Barnsley, Exeter City and Cambridge United in a defensive role.

After a 5-year spell as assistant manager to Steve Coppell at Crystal Palace he became manager of Swansea City from March 1989 to March 1990. Evans went on to be assistant coach to Mick McCarthy with the Republic of Ireland and helped McCarthy get the team to the 2002 World Cup finals in Japan and Korea. He subsequently worked as McCarthy's assistant coach at Sunderland and Wolves. After his role as assistant manager at Wolves he then became part of the scouting network at Wolves, departing on 2 November 2012, one day after McCarthy accepted the manager position at Ipswich Town.
