= Christian Coste =

French footballer (born 1949)

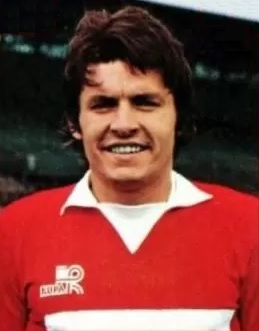
- Christian Coste in 1975.

Personal information
- Full name: Christian Coste
- Date of birth: 23 February 1949 (age 77)
- Place of birth: Saint-Christol, Hérault, France
- Position: Striker

Senior career*
Years	Team	Apps	(Gls)
1971–1973	FC Sète	?	(?)
1973–1977	Lille OSC	98	(48)
1977–1978	Stade de Reims	32	(13)
1978–1980	Stade Lavallois	22	(4)
1980–1982	Thonon	?	(?)

International career
1974–1975	France	5	(2)

Managerial career
- 1982–1984: CS Chênois
- 1984–1985: FC Meyrin
- 1985: Paris SG
- 1988–1989: FC Meyrin
- 1992–1993: FC Annecy
- 2000–?: Gabon DTN
- ?–?: Gabon (women)
- * Club domestic league appearances and goals

Christian Coste (born 23 February 1949) is a former professional French footballer.
