= UEFA Euro 1976 quarter-finals =

Football qualifying round

The UEFA Euro 1976 quarter-finals was the last round of qualifying competition for UEFA Euro 1976. It was contested by the eight group winners from the previous round of qualifying. The winners of each of four home-and-away ties qualified for the finals tournament in Yugoslavia. The matches were played on 24–25 April and 22 May 1976.

== Qualification ==
Each group winner progressed to the quarter-finals. The quarter-finals were played in two legs on a home-and-away basis. The winners of the quarter-finals would go through to the final tournament.

== Summary ==
Team 1	Agg.	Team 2	1st leg	2nd leg
Yugoslavia	3–1	Wales	2–0	1–1
Czechoslovakia	4–2	Soviet Union	2–0	2–2
Spain	1–3	West Germany	1–1	0–2
Netherlands	7–1	Belgium	5–0	2–1

== Matches ==
The eight matches took place over two legs, the first being on 24 and 25 April 1976, and the second on 22 May 1976.

24 April 1976
17:30

Yugoslavia	2–0	Wales
Vukotić 1'; Popivoda 57'	Report

Stadion Maksimir, Zagreb
Attendance: 36,917
Referee: Paul Schiller (Austria)
22 May 1976
15:00

Wales	1–1	Yugoslavia
Evans 38'	Report	Katalinski 19' (pen.)

Ninian Park, Cardiff
Attendance: 30,346
Referee: Rudi Glöckner (East Germany)

Yugoslavia won 3–1 on aggregate.

24 April 1976
17:30

Czechoslovakia	2–0	Soviet Union
Móder 34'; Panenka 47'	Report

Tehelné Pole, Bratislava
Attendance: 47,621
Referee: Hilmi Ok (Turkey)
22 May 1976
19:00

Soviet Union	2–2	Czechoslovakia
Buryak 53'; Blokhin 87'	Report	Móder 45', 82'

NSK Olimpiyskyi, Kiev
Attendance: 76,495
Referee: Alistair McKenzie (Scotland)

Czechoslovakia won 4–2 on aggregate.

24 April 1976
21:00

Spain	1–1	West Germany
Santillana 21'	Report	Beer 60'

Estadio Vicente Calderón, Madrid
Attendance: 51,771
Referee: Jack Taylor (England)
22 May 1976
16:00

West Germany	2–0	Spain
Hoeneß 17'; Toppmöller 43'	Report

Olympiastadion, Munich
Attendance: 77,673
Referee: Robert Wurtz (France)

West Germany won 3–1 on aggregate.

25 April 1976
14:30

Netherlands	5–0	Belgium
Rijsbergen 17'; Rensenbrink 27', 58', 85'; Neeskens 79' (pen.)	Report

Feijenoord Stadion, Rotterdam
Attendance: 48,706
Referee: Jean Dubach (Switzerland)
22 May 1976
20:00

Belgium	1–2	Netherlands
Van Gool 27'	Report	Rep 61'; Cruyff 77'

Roi Baudouin, Brussels
Attendance: 19,050
Referee: Alberto Michelotti (Italy)

Netherlands won 7–1 on aggregate.

== Goalscorers ==
There were 22 goals scored in 8 matches, for an average of 2.75 goals per match.

3 goals

- (Czechoslovakia national football team) Jozef Móder
- (Netherlands national football team) Rob Rensenbrink

1 goal

- (Belgium national football team) Roger Van Gool
- (Czechoslovakia national football team) Antonín Panenka
- (Netherlands national football team) Johan Cruyff
- (Netherlands national football team) Johan Neeskens
- (Netherlands national football team) Johnny Rep
- (Netherlands national football team) Wim Rijsbergen
- (Soviet Union national football team) Oleg Blokhin
- (Soviet Union national football team) Leonid Buryak
- (Spain national football team) Santillana
- (Wales national football team) Ian Evans
- (Germany national football team) Erich Beer
- (Germany national football team) Uli Hoeneß
- (Germany national football team) Klaus Toppmöller
- (Yugoslavia national football team) Josip Katalinski
- (Yugoslavia national football team) Danilo Popivoda
- (Yugoslavia national football team) Momčilo Vukotić
