= Zvonko Ivezić =

Yugoslav and Serbian football manager and player (1949–2016)

Personal information
- Full name: Zvonko Ivezić
- Date of birth: 17 February 1949
- Place of birth: Vajska, PR Serbia, FPR Yugoslavia
- Date of death: 4 September 2016 (aged 67)
- Place of death: Novi Sad, Serbia
- Height: 1.71 m (5 ft 7 in)
- Position: Forward

Youth career
- 1965–1967: Vojvodina

Senior career*
Years	Team	Apps	(Gls)
1967–1976	Vojvodina	220	(60)
1976–1982	Sochaux	193	(53)
1982–1983	Racing Paris	33	(4)
Total		446	(117)

International career
1975–1976	Yugoslavia	4	(2)

Managerial career
- ČSK Čelarevo
- 1996: Bečej
- 1997: Mladost Bački Jarak
- 2002: Vrbas
- 2004: Inđija
- 2004: Rudar Ugljevik
- * Club domestic league appearances and goals

Zvonko Ivezić (Serbian Cyrillic: Звонко Ивезић; 17 February 1949 – 4 September 2016) was a Yugoslav and Serbian football manager and player.

== Club career ==
Born in Vajska, Ivezić joined Vojvodina in 1965, making his Yugoslav First League debut in the 1967–68 season. He amassed 220 appearances and scored 60 goals for the club in the top flight. In 1976, Ivezić moved abroad to France and signed with Sochaux, spending six seasons with the club. He also briefly played for Racing Club de Paris, before retiring in 1983.

== International career ==
At international level, Ivezić was capped four times for Yugoslavia between 1975 and 1976, scoring two goals. His final international was a September 1976 friendly match against Italy.

== Managerial career ==
After hanging up his boots, Ivezić managed numerous clubs in his homeland, including Bečej and Mladost Bački Jarak in the First League of FR Yugoslavia during the 1996–97 season.

In 2002, Ivezić was manager of Vrbas in the Second League of FR Yugoslavia. He also served as manager of Premier League of Bosnia and Herzegovina club Rudar Ugljevik in 2004.
