= Spain national football team results (1980–1989) =

These are all the matches played by the Spain national football team between 1980 and 1989:

== Meaning ==
	Meaning
S.O.	Summer Olympics
W.C.	FIFA World Cup
EURO	UEFA European Championship
CC	FIFA Confederations Cup
TB	Tie-break match
Q	Qualification rounds
R + number	Round number
FR	Final round
GS	Group stage
1/32	Round of 32
1/16	Round of 16
QF	Quarter-final
SF	Semi-final
F	Final
RP	Repechage
Rep.	Replay match
3rd–4th	Third place match

== Results ==
103 matches played:

=== 1980 ===
23 January 1980 Friendly	Spain	1 – 0	Netherlands	(Spain) Balaídos, Vigo
	Dani 82' (pen.)			Attendance: 19,000; Referee: (France) Marcel Bacou

13 February 1980 Friendly	Spain	0 – 1	East Germany	(Spain) La Rosaleda, Málaga
			58' Streich	Attendance: 30,000; Referee: (Switzerland) André Daina

26 March 1980 Friendly	Spain	0 – 2	England	(Spain) Camp Nou, Barcelona
			15' Woodcock; 65' Francis	Attendance: 50,000; Referee: (West Germany) Volker Roth

16 April 1980 Friendly	Spain	2 – 2	Czechoslovakia	(Spain) El Molinón, Gijón, Asturias
	Migueli 48'; Quini 68'		33', 53' Nehoda	Attendance: 25,000; Referee: (Austria) Heinz Fahnler

25 May 1980 Friendly	Denmark	2 – 2	Spain	(Denmark) Idraetspark, Aarhus
	Simonsen 53'; Bastrup 61'		9' Saura; 71' Alexanko	Attendance: 23,998; Referee: (West Germany) Walter Eschweiler

12 June 1980 (Italy) 1980 EURO GS	Spain	0 – 0	Italy	(Italy) Giuseppe Meazza, Milan
20:30 CEST				Attendance: 46,816; Referee: (Hungary) Károly Palotai

15 June 1980 (Italy) 1980 EURO GS	Belgium	2 – 1	Spain	(Italy) Giuseppe Meazza, Milan
17:45 CEST	Gerets 16'; Cools 64'		36' Quini	Attendance: 11,430; Referee: (Netherlands) Charles Corver

18 June 1980 (Italy) 1980 EURO GS	Spain	1 – 2	England	(Italy) San Paolo, Naples
17:45 CEST	Dani 48'		19' Brooking; 61' Woodcock	Attendance: 14,440; Referee: (Austria) Erich Linemayr

24 September 1980 Friendly	Hungary	2 – 2	Spain	(Hungary) Népstadion, Budapest
	Kiss 10'; Béla 47'		3' Juanito; 68' Satrústegui	Attendance: 15,000; Referee: (Czechoslovakia) Jozef Marko

15 October 1980 Friendly	East Germany	0 – 0	Spain	(East Germany) Zentralstadion, Leipzig
				Attendance: 30,000; Referee: (Czechoslovakia) Ján Veverka

12 November 1980 Friendly	Spain	1 – 2	Poland	(Spain) Sarrià, Barcelona
	Dani 88' (pen.)		19', 89' Iwan	Attendance: 20,000; Referee: (Belgium) Roger Schoeters

=== 1981 ===
18 February 1981 Friendly	Spain	1 – 0	France	(Spain) Vicente Calderón, Madrid
	Juanito 86' (pen.)			Attendance: 18,000; Referee: (Romania) Carol Jurja

25 March 1981 Friendly	England	1 – 2	Spain	(England) Wembley, London
	Hoddle 26'		4' Satrústegui; 32' Zamora	Attendance: 71,840; Referee: (West Germany) Walter Eschweiler

15 April 1981 Friendly	Spain	0 – 3	Hungary	(Spain) Luis Casanova, Valencia
			31' Kiss; 84' Béla; 90' Nyilasi	Attendance: 25,000; Referee: (France) Daniel Lambert

20 June 1981 Friendly	Portugal	2 – 0	Spain	(Portugal) Das Antas, Porto
	Nené 80'; Nogueira 83'			Attendance: 5,000; Referee: (France) Marcel Bacou

23 June 1981 Friendly	Mexico	1 – 3	Spain	Azteca, Mexico City
	Sánchez 64'		29', 46' Juanito; 83' Zamora	Attendance: 50,000; Referee: (Socialist Federal Republic of Yugoslavia) Damir Matovinović

28 June 1981 Friendly	Venezuela	0 – 2	Spain	(Venezuela) Olímpico de la UCV, Caracas
			6' Juanito; 73' (pen.) Satrústegui	Attendance: 15,000; Referee: (Colombia) Guillermo Velasquez

2 July 1981 Friendly	Colombia	1 – 1	Spain	(Colombia) El Campín, Bogotá
	Herrera 77'		86' Alexanko	Attendance: 25,000; Referee: (Venezuela) Vicente Llobregat

5 July 1981 Friendly	Chile	1 – 1	Spain	(Chile) Nacional Julio Martínez Prádanos, Ñuñoa
	Caszely 8'		16' Satrústegui	Attendance: 15,000; Referee: (Argentina) Jorge Romero

8 July 1981 Friendly	Brazil	1 – 0	Spain	(Brazil) Fonte Nova, Salvador, Bahia
	Baltazar 47'			Attendance: 74,089; Referee: (England) Clive White

23 September 1981 Friendly	Austria	0 – 0	Spain	(Austria) Praterstadion, Vienna
				Attendance: 15,000; Referee: (Czechoslovakia) Jozef Marko

14 October 1981 Friendly	Spain	3 – 0	Luxembourg	(Spain) Luis Casanova, Valencia
	Ufarte 68', 82'; Saura 75'			Attendance: 15,000; Referee: (Italy) Paolo Casarin

18 November 1981 Friendly	Poland	2 – 3	Spain	(Poland) Łódź
	Pałasz 56'; Boniek 74'		10' Ufarte; 80' Alexanko; 88' Periko Alonso	Attendance: 15,000; Referee: (Hungary) Róbert Jaczina

16 December 1981 Friendly	Spain	2 – 0	Belgium	(Spain) Luis Casanova, Valencia
	Satrústegui 7', 87'			Attendance: 28,000; Referee: (West Germany) Volker Roth

=== 1982 ===
24 February 1982 Friendly	Spain	3 – 0	Scotland	(Spain) Luis Casanova, Valencia
	Víctor 26'; Quini 82' (pen.); Gallego 86'			Attendance: 30,000; Referee: (Netherlands) Albert Thomas

24 March 1982 Friendly	Spain	1 – 1	Wales	(Spain) Luis Casanova, Valencia
	Satrústegui 25'		51' James	Attendance: 15,000; Referee: (Italy) Enzo Barbaresco

28 April 1982 Friendly	Spain	2 – 0	Switzerland	(Spain) Luis Casanova, Valencia
	Tendillo 20'; Alexanko 42'			Attendance: 18,000; Referee: (England) George Courtney

16 June 1982 (Spain) 1982 W.C. GS	Spain	1 – 1	Honduras	(Spain) Luis Casanova, Valencia
21:15 CEST	Ufarte 66' (pen.)		7' Zelaya	Attendance: 49,562; Referee: (Argentina) Arturo Ithurralde

20 June 1982 (Spain) 1982 W.C. GS	Spain	2 – 1	Yugoslavia	(Spain) Luis Casanova, Valencia
21:15 CEST	Juanito 12' (pen.); Saura 66'		10' Gudelj	Attendance: 48,000; Referee: (Denmark) Henning Lund-Sørensen

25 June 1982 (Spain) 1982 W.C. GS	Spain	0 – 1	Northern Ireland	(Spain) Luis Casanova, Valencia
21:15 CEST			47' Armstrong	Attendance: 49,562; Referee: (Paraguay) Héctor Ortíz

2 July 1982 (Spain) 1982 W.C. R2	West Germany	2 – 1	Spain	(Spain) Santiago Bernabéu, Madrid
21:15 CEST	Littbarski 49'; Fischer 75'		82' Zamora	Attendance: 90,089; Referee: (Italy) Paolo Casarin

5 July 1982 (Spain) 1982 W.C. R2	Spain	0 – 0	England	(Spain) Santiago Bernabéu, Madrid
21:15 CEST				Attendance: 75,000; Referee: (Belgium) Alexis Ponnet

27 October 1982 (France) 1984 EURO Q	Spain	1 – 0	Iceland	(Spain) La Rosaleda, Málaga
	Pedraza 59'			Attendance: 12,000; Referee: (Portugal) Mário Luís

17 November 1982 (France) 1984 EURO Q	Republic of Ireland	3 – 3	Spain	(Republic of Ireland) Lansdowne Road, Dublin
	Grimes 2'; Stapleton 64', 76'		30' Maceda; 46' (o.g.) Martin; 60' Víctor	Attendance: 39,000; Referee: (West Germany) Jan Redelfs

=== 1983 ===
16 February 1983 (France) 1984 EURO Q	Spain	1 – 0	Netherlands	(Spain) Ramón Sánchez Pizjuán, Sevilla
	Señor 43' (pen.)			Attendance: 45,000; Referee: (Italy) Paolo Bergamo

27 April 1983 (France) 1984 EURO Q	Spain	2 – 0	Republic of Ireland	(Spain) La Romareda, Zaragoza
	Santillana 51'; Rincón 89'			Attendance: 45,000; Referee: (Soviet Union) Valeri Butenko

15 May 1983 (France) 1984 EURO Q	Malta	2 – 3	Spain	(Malta) National Stadium, Ta' Qali
	Busuttil 30', 49'		22' Señor; 60' Carrasco; 85' Gordillo	Attendance: 7,732; Referee: (Greece) Evangelos Giannakoudakis

29 May 1983 (France) 1984 EURO Q	Iceland	0 – 1	Spain	(Iceland) Laugardalsvöllur, Reykjavík
			9' Maceda	Attendance: 7,055; Referee: (Wales) Ronald Bridges

5 October 1983 Friendly	France	1 – 1	Spain	(France) Parc des Princes, Paris
	Rocheteau 60'		82' (pen.) Señor	Attendance: 36,628; Referee: (Italy) Rosario Lo Bello

16 November 1983 (France) 1984 EURO Q	Netherlands	2 – 1	Spain	(Netherlands) De Kuip, Rotterdam
	Houtman 26'; Gullit 63'		41' Santillana	Attendance: 58,000; Referee: (France) Michel Vautrot

21 December 1983 (France) 1984 EURO Q	Spain	12 – 1	Malta	(Spain) Benito Villamarín, Sevilla
	Santillana 15', 26', 29', 66'; Rincón 47', 57', 64', 78'; Maceda 62', 63'; Sarabia 80'; Señor 84'	Report	24' Degiorgio	Attendance: 25,000; Referee: (Turkey) Erkan Göksel

=== 1984 ===
18 January 1984 Friendly	Spain	0 – 1	Hungary	(Spain) Ramón de Carranza, Cádiz
			69' Garaba	Attendance: 25,000; Referee: (England) Joe Worrall

29 February 1984 Friendly	Luxembourg	0 – 1	Spain	Josy Barthel, Luxembourg City
			64' Maceda	Attendance: 3,000; Referee: (Switzerland) Philippe Mercier

11 April 1984 Friendly	Spain	2 – 1	Denmark	(Spain) Luis Casanova, Valencia
	Santillana 54'; Señor 61'		47' Eriksen	Attendance: 25,010; Referee: (Portugal) Mário Luís

26 May 1984 Friendly	Switzerland	0 – 4	Spain	(Switzerland) Charmilles, Geneva
			13' Santillana; 25' Gallego; 34' Rincón; 63' Goikoetxea	Attendance: 18,000; Referee: (Italy) Luigi Agnolin

31 May 1984 Friendly	Hungary	1 – 1	Spain	(Hungary) Üllői Úti, Budapest
	Nagy 48'		21' Rincón	Attendance: 10,000; Referee: (West Germany) Aron Schmidhuber

7 June 1984 Friendly	Spain	0 – 1	Yugoslavia	(Spain) Municipal, La Línea de la Concepción
			1' Sušić	Attendance: 20,000; Referee: (Italy) Enzo Barbaresco

14 June 1984 (France) 1984 EURO GS	Romania	1 – 1	Spain	(France) Geoffroy-Guichard, Saint-Étienne
20:30 CEST	Bölöni 34'		21' (pen.) Carrasco	Attendance: 17,102; Referee: (Belgium) Alexis Ponnet

17 June 1984 (France) 1984 EURO GS	Portugal	1 – 1	Spain	(France) Vélodrome, Marseille
20:30 CEST	Sousa 52'		73' Santillana	Attendance: 24,364; Referee: (France) Michel Vautrot

20 June 1984 (France) 1984 EURO GS	West Germany	0 – 1	Spain	(France) Parc des Princes, Paris
20:30 CEST			89' Maceda	Attendance: 47,691; Referee: (Czechoslovakia) Vojtěch Christov

24 June 1984 (France) 1984 EURO SF	Spain	1 – 1 (AET) (5 – 4 p)	Denmark	(France) De Gerland, Lyon
20:00 CEST	Maceda 67'		6' Lerby	Attendance: 47,483; Referee: (England) George Courtney
	Penalties
	Santillana (penalty scored); Señor (penalty scored); Urquiaga (penalty scored); Muñoz (penalty scored); Sarabia (penalty scored)		(penalty scored) Brylle; (penalty scored) Olsen; (penalty scored) Laudrup; (penalty scored) Lerby; (penalty missed) Elkjær

27 June 1984 (France) 1984 EURO F	France	2 – 0	Spain	(France) Parc des Princes, Paris
20:00 CEST	Arconada 57' (o.g.); Bellone 90'			Attendance: 47,368; Referee: (Czechoslovakia) Vojtěch Christov

17 October 1984 (Mexico) 1986 W.C. Q	Spain	3 – 0	Wales	(Spain) Benito Villamarín, Sevilla
	Rincón 7'; Carrasco 81'; Butragueño 90'			Attendance: 42,500; Referee: (Sweden) Erik Fredriksson

14 November 1984 (Mexico) 1986 W.C. Q	Scotland	3 – 1	Spain	(Scotland) Hampden Park, Glasgow
	Johnston 33', 42'; Dalglish 72'		68' Goikoetxea	Attendance: 74,299; Referee: (East Germany) Adolf Prokop

=== 1985 ===
23 January 1985 Friendly	Spain	3 – 1	Finland	(Spain) Rico Pérez, Alicante
	Rincón 22'; Butragueño 30' (pen.), 44'		6' Lipponen	Attendance: 36,000; Referee: (Belgium) Alphonse Constantin

27 February 1985 (Mexico) 1986 W.C. Q	Spain	1 – 0	Scotland	(Spain) Ramón Sánchez Pizjuán, Sevilla
	Clos 48'			Attendance: 70,410; Referee: (France) Michel Vautrot

27 March 1985 Friendly	Spain	0 – 0	Northern Ireland	(Spain) Lluís Sitjar, Palma de Mallorca
				Attendance: 30,000; Referee: (Turkey) Coşkun Kutay

30 April 1985 (Mexico) 1986 W.C. Q	Wales	3 – 0	Spain	(Wales) Racecourse Ground, Wrexham
	Rush 43', 86'; Hughes 56'			Attendance: 23,494; Referee: (Netherlands) Jan Keizer

26 May 1985 Friendly	Republic of Ireland	0 – 0	Spain	(Republic of Ireland) Páirc Uí Rinn, Cork
				Attendance: 12,000; Referee: (Switzerland) Franz Gachter

12 June 1985 (Mexico) 1986 W.C. Q	Iceland	1 – 2	Spain	(Iceland) Laugardalsvöllur, Reykjavík
	Thordasson 33'		47' Marcos; 50' Gallego	Attendance: 10,410; Referee: (Switzerland) André Daina

25 September 1985 (Mexico) 1986 W.C. Q	Spain	2 – 1	Iceland	(Spain) Benito Villamarín, Sevilla
	Rincón 44'; Gordillo 52'		35' Thornbjómsson	Attendance: 45,000; Referee: (East Germany) Siegfried Kirschen

20 November 1985 Friendly	Spain	0 – 0	Austria	(Spain) La Romareda, Zaragoza
				Attendance: 18,000; Referee: (France) Claude Bouillet

18 December 1985 Friendly	Spain	2 – 0	Bulgaria	(Spain) Luis Casanova, Valencia
	Michel 16'; Calderé 70'			Attendance: 50,000; Referee: (Italy) Carlo Longhi

=== 1986 ===
22 January 1986 Friendly	Spain	2 – 0	Soviet Union	(Spain) Insular, Las Palmas de G.C., Canary Islands
	Salinas 25'; Eloy 85'			Attendance: 12,000; Referee: (Portugal) José Rosa dos Santos

19 February 1986 Friendly	Spain	3 – 0	Belgium	(Spain) Nuevo Estadio de Elche, Elche
	Butragueño 3'; Salinas 41'; Maceda 72'			Attendance: 40,000; Referee: (Italy) Paolo Casarin

26 March 1986 Friendly	Spain	3 – 0	Poland	(Spain) Ramón de Carranza, Cádiz
	Michel 20'; Calderé 30'; Salinas 48'			Attendance: 17,000; Referee: (France) Jean-Marie Lartigot

1 June 1986 (Mexico) 1986 W.C. GS	Brazil	1 – 0	Spain	(Mexico) Jalisco, Guadalajara
19:00 CEST	Sócrates 62'			Attendance: 65,000; Referee: (Australia) Chris Bambridge

7 June 1986 (Mexico) 1986 W.C. GS	Spain	2 – 1	Northern Ireland	(Mexico) Tres de Marzo, Guadalajara
19:00 CEST	Butragueño 2'; Salinas 20'		47' Clarke	Attendance: 28,000; Referee: (Austria) Horst Brummeier

12 June 1986 (Mexico) 1986 W.C. GS	Spain	3 – 0	Algeria	(Mexico) Tecnológico, Monterrey
19:00 CEST	Calderé 16', 68'; Eloy 71'			Attendance: 20,000; Referee: (Japan) Shizuo Takada

18 June 1986 (Mexico) 1986 W.C. 1/8	Denmark	1 – 5	Spain	(Mexico) La Corregidora, Santiago de Querétaro
23:00 CEST	Olsen 32' (pen.)		43', 57', 80', 89' (pen.) Butragueño; 69' (pen.) Goikoetxea	Attendance: 38,500; Referee: (Netherlands) Jan Keizer

22 June 1986 (Mexico) 1986 W.C. QF	Belgium	1 – 1 (AET) (5 – 4 p)	Spain	(Mexico) Cuauhtémoc, Puebla
23:00 CEST	Ceulemans 34'		85' Señor	Attendance: 45,000; Referee: (East Germany) Siegfried Kirschen
	Penalties
	Claesen (penalty scored); Scifo (penalty scored); Broos (penalty scored); Vervoort (penalty scored); L. Van der Elst (penalty scored)		(penalty scored) Señor; (penalty missed) Eloy; (penalty scored) Chendo; (penalty scored) Butragueño; (penalty scored) Muñoz

24 September 1986 Friendly	Spain	3 – 1	Greece	(Spain) El Molinón, Gijón, Asturias
	Salinas 35'; Francisco 39'; Víctor 79'		81' Skartados	Attendance: 17,500; Referee: (France) Alain Delair

15 October 1986 Friendly	West Germany	2 – 2	Spain	(West Germany) Niedersachsenstadion, Hanover
	Waas 61'; Rahn 70'		44' Butragueño; 78' (pen.) Goikoetxea	Attendance: 50,000; Referee: (Soviet Union) Yuriy Savchenko

12 November 1986 (West Germany) 1988 EURO Q	Spain	1 – 0	Romania	(Spain) Benito Villamarín, Sevilla
	Míchel 57'			Attendance: 41,884; Referee: (Netherlands) Jan Keizer

3 December 1986 (West Germany) 1988 EURO Q	Albania	1 – 2	Spain	(Albania) Qemal Stafa, Tirana
	Muça 27'		67' Arteche; 83' Alonso	Attendance: 20,000; Referee: (Hungary) Antal Hutak

=== 1987 ===
21 January 1987 Friendly	Spain	1 – 1	Netherlands	(Spain) Camp Nou, Barcelona
	Calderé 72'		20' Gullit	Attendance: 15,000; Referee: (Belgium) Marcel Văn Langenhove

18 February 1987 Friendly	Spain	2 – 4	England	(Spain) Santiago Bernabéu, Madrid
	Butragueño 14'; Ramón 76'		23', 27', 47', 57' Lineker	Attendance: 35,000; Referee: (Italy) Claudio Pieri

1 April 1987 (West Germany) 1988 EURO Q	Austria	2 – 3	Spain	(Austria) Praterstadion, Vienna
	Linzmaier 39'; Polster 64'		31', 58' Eloy; 90' Carrasco	Attendance: 31,342; Referee: (Switzerland) Bruno Galler

29 April 1987 (West Germany) 1988 EURO Q	Romania	3 – 1	Spain	(Romania) Stadionul Steaua, Bucharest
	Piţurcă 37'; Mateuţ 44'; Ungureanu 45+3'		83' Calderé	Attendance: 30,000; Referee: (Belgium) Alexis Ponnet

23 September 1987 Friendly	Spain	2 – 0	Luxembourg	(Spain) Castalia, Castellón
	Carrasco 26' (pen.); Butragueño 65' (pen.)			Attendance: 22,000; Referee: (Portugal) José Guedes

14 October 1987 (West Germany) 1988 EURO Q	Spain	2 – 0	Austria	(Spain) Ramón Sánchez Pizjuán, Sevilla
	Míchel 56' (pen.); Sanchís 62'			Attendance: 57,477; Referee: (France) Joël Quiniou

18 November 1987 (West Germany) 1988 EURO Q	Spain	5 – 0	Albania	(Spain) Benito Villamarín, Sevilla
	Bakero 5', 31', 74'; Míchel 34' (pen.); Gento 67'			Attendance: 50,000; Referee: (Switzerland) Kurt Röthlisberger

=== 1988 ===
27 January 1988 Friendly	Spain	0 – 0	East Germany	(Spain) Luis Casanova, Valencia
				Attendance: 20,000; Referee: (France) Michel Girard

24 February 1988 Friendly	Spain	1 – 2	Czechoslovakia	(Spain) La Rosaleda, Málaga
	Salinas 30'		44' Knoflíček; 76' Kubík	Attendance: 30,000; Referee: (Italy) Pietro D`Elia

23 March 1988 Friendly	France	2 – 1	Spain	(France) Chaban-Delmas, Bordeaux
	Passi 8'; Fernández 26'		6' Calderé	Attendance: 14,441; Referee: (England) Neil Midgley

27 April 1988 Friendly	Spain	0 – 0	Scotland	(Spain) Santiago Bernabéu, Madrid
				Attendance: 15,000; Referee: (Portugal) Carlos Valente

1 June 1988 Friendly	Spain	1 – 3	Sweden	(Spain) El Helmántico, Villares de la Reina
	Butragueño 14'		22' Nilsson; 45' Hysén; 48' Magnusson	Attendance: 25,000; Referee: (England) Joe Worrall

5 June 1988 Friendly	Switzerland	1 – 1	Spain	(Switzerland) Saint Jackob, Basel
	Sutter 63'		44' Andrinúa	Attendance: 14,000; Referee: (France) Michel Girard

11 June 1988 (West Germany) 1988 EURO GS	Denmark	2 – 3	Spain	(West Germany) Niedersachsenstadion, Hanover
15:30 CEST	Laudrup 25'; Povlsen 84'		6' Míchel; 53' Butragueño; 66' Gordillo	Attendance: 60,366; Referee: (Netherlands) Albert Thomas

14 June 1988 (West Germany) 1988 EURO GS	Italy	1 – 0	Spain	(West Germany) Waldstadion, Frankfurt
20:15 CEST	Vialli 73'			Attendance: 51,790; Referee: (Sweden) Erik Fredriksson

17 June 1988 (West Germany) 1988 EURO GS	West Germany	2 – 0	Spain	(West Germany) Olympiastadion, Munich
20:15 CEST	Völler 30', 50'			Attendance: 72,308; Referee: (France) Michel Vautrot

14 September 1988 Friendly	Spain	1 – 2	Yugoslavia	(Spain) Antiguo Carlos Tartiere, Oviedo, Asturias
	Míchel 25'		46' Baždarević; 84' Cvetković	Attendance: 22,000; Referee: (Portugal) Alder Santos

12 October 1988 Friendly	Spain	1 – 1	Argentina	(Spain) Ramón Sánchez Pizjuán, Sevilla
	Butragueño 7'		44' Caniggia	Attendance: 60,250; Referee: (Italy) Carlo Longhi

16 November 1988 (Italy) 1990 W.C. Q	Spain	2 – 0	Republic of Ireland	(Spain) Benito Villamarín, Sevilla
	Manolo 52'; Butragueño 65'			Attendance: 50,000; Referee: (Soviet Union) Yuri Savchenko

21 December 1988 (Italy) 1990 W.C. Q	Spain	4 – 0	Northern Ireland	(Spain) Ramón Sánchez Pizjuán, Sevilla
	Rogan 30' (o.g.); Butragueño 55'; Míchel 62' (pen.); Roberto 65'			Attendance: 70,000; Referee: (Belgium) Marcel van Langenhove

=== 1989 ===
22 January 1989 (Italy) 1990 W.C. Q	Malta	0 – 2	Spain	(Malta) National Stadium, Ta'Qali
			17' (pen.) Míchel; 51' Beriguistáin	Attendance: 15,797; Referee: (Scotland) David Syme

8 February 1989 (Italy) 1990 W.C. Q	Northern Ireland	0 – 2	Spain	(Northern Ireland) Windsor Park, Belfast
			3' Andrinúa; 84' Manolo	Attendance: 15,000; Referee: (West Germany) Dieter Pauly

23 March 1989 (Italy) 1990 W.C. Q	Spain	4 – 0	Malta	(Spain) Benito Villamarín, Sevilla
	Míchel 38', 67' (pen.); Manolo 72', 80'			Attendance: 41,500; Referee: (Switzerland) Georges Sandoz

26 April 1989 (Italy) 1990 W.C. Q	Republic of Ireland	1 – 0	Spain	(Republic of Ireland) Lansdowne Road, Dublin
	Míchel 17' (o.g.)			Attendance: 49,160; Referee: (Austria) Horst Brummeier

20 September 1989 Friendly	Spain	1 – 0	Poland	(Spain) Riazor, A Coruña
	Míchel 19'			Attendance: 20,000; Referee: (Portugal) Francisco Silva

11 October 1989 (Italy) 1990 W.C. Q	Hungary	2 – 2	Spain	(Hungary) Népstadion, Budapest
	Attila Pintér 40', 83'		31' Salinas; 35' Míchel	Attendance: 30,000; Referee: (England) George Courtney

15 November 1989 (Italy) 1990 W.C. Q	Spain	4 – 0	Hungary	(Spain) Ramón Sánchez Pizjuán, Sevilla
	Manolo 7'; Butragueño 24'; Juanito 41'; Fernando 63'			Attendance: 20,000; Referee: (France) Gérard Biguet

13 December 1989 Friendly	Spain	2 – 1	Switzerland	(Spain) H. Rodríguez López, Tenerife, Canary Islands
	Míchel 42' (pen.); Felipe 61'		48' Knup	Attendance: 22,000; Referee: (Italy) Rosario Lo Bello
