= 1982 FIFA World Cup qualification – UEFA Group 2 =

Group 2 consisted of five of the 34 teams entered into the European zone: Belgium, Republic of Ireland, France, Netherlands and Cyprus. These five teams competed on a home-and-away basis for two of the 14 spots in the final tournament allocated to the European zone, with the group's winner and runner-up claiming those spots.

== Standings and results ==
Rank	Team	Pts	Pld	W	D	L	GF	GA	GD
1	Belgium	11	8	5	1	2	12	9	+3
2	France	10	8	5	0	3	20	8	+12
3	Republic of Ireland	10	8	4	2	2	17	11	+6
4	Netherlands	9	8	4	1	3	11	7	+4
5	Cyprus	0	8	0	0	8	4	29	−25

=== Results ===
26 March 1980

Cyprus	2 – 3	Republic of Ireland
N. Pantziaras 29'; Kaiafas 74' (pen.)	Report	McGee 8', 38'; Lawrenson 23'

Makario Stadium, Nicosia
Attendance: 6,800
Referee: Zvi Shahir (Israel)

10 September 1980

Republic of Ireland	2 – 1	Netherlands
Daly 78'; Lawrenson 85'	Report	Tahamata 57'

Lansdowne Road, Dublin
Attendance: 25,782
Referee: Henning Lund-Sørensen (Denmark)

11 October 1980

Cyprus	0 – 7	France
	Report	Lacombe 4'; Platini 14', 23'; Larios 40' (pen.), 76' (pen.); Six 82'; Zimako 87'

Tsirion Stadium, Limassol
Attendance: 9,500
Referee: Bruno Galler (Switzerland)

15 October 1980

Republic of Ireland	1 – 1	Belgium
Grealish 42'	Report	Cluytens 13'

Lansdowne Road, Dublin
Attendance: 36,524
Referee: Norbert Rolles (Luxembourg)

28 October 1980

France	2 – 0	Republic of Ireland
Platini 11'; Zimako 77'	Report

Parc des Princes, Paris
Attendance: 44,800
Referee: Augusto Lamo Castillo (Spain)

19 November 1980

Belgium	1 – 0	Netherlands
Vandenbergh 48' (pen.)	Report

Stade du Heysel, Brussels
Attendance: 57,665
Referee: Eldar Azimzade (Soviet Union)

19 November 1980

Republic of Ireland	6 – 0	Cyprus
Daly 10' (pen.), 23'; Grealish 24'; Robinson 28'; Stapleton 46'; Hughton 65'	Report

Lansdowne Road, Dublin
Attendance: 24,351
Referee: Eysteinn Gudmundsson (Iceland)

21 December 1980

Cyprus	0 – 2	Belgium
	Report	Vandenbergh 30'; Ceulemans 68'

Makario Stadium, Nicosia
Attendance: 6,000
Referee: Robert Valentine (Scotland)

18 February 1981

Belgium	3 – 2	Cyprus
Plessers 12'; Vandenbergh 17'; Ceulemans 67'	Report	Lysandrou 42'; Vrachimis 60'

Stade du Heysel, Brussels
Attendance: 17,445
Referee: Arto Ravander (Finland)

22 February 1981

Netherlands	3 – 0	Cyprus
Hovenkamp 15'; Schapendonk 48'; Nanninga 58'	Report

Oosterpark Stadion, Groningen
Attendance: 12,972
Referee: Howard King (Wales)

25 March 1981

Netherlands	1 – 0	France
Mühren 47'	Report

Stadion Feijenoord, Rotterdam
Attendance: 58,000
Referee: Luigi Agnolin (Italy)

25 March 1981

Belgium	1 – 0	Republic of Ireland
Ceulemans 88'	Report

Stade du Heysel, Brussels
Attendance: 39,178
Referee: Raúl Joaquim Fernandes Nazaré (Portugal)

29 April 1981

Cyprus	0 – 1	Netherlands
	Report	Van Kooten 29'

Makario Stadium, Nicosia
Attendance: 7,500
Referee: Ivan Yosifov (Bulgaria)

29 April 1981

France	3 – 2	Belgium
Soler 14', 31'; Six 26'	Report	Vandenbergh 5'; Ceulemans 52'

Parc des Princes, Paris
Attendance: 46,194
Referee: Victoriano Sánchez Arminio (Spain)

9 September 1981

Netherlands	2 – 2	Republic of Ireland
Thijssen 11'; Mühren 64' (pen.)	Report	Robinson 40'; Stapleton 71'

Stadion Feijenoord, Rotterdam
Attendance: 46,000
Referee: Vojtěch Christov (Czechoslovakia)

9 September 1981

Belgium	2 – 0	France
Czerniatynski 24'; Vandenbergh 83'	Report

Stade du Heysel, Brussels
Attendance: 52,525
Referee: Károly Palotai (Hungary)

14 October 1981

Netherlands	3 – 0	Belgium
Metgod 6'; Van Kooten 26'; Geels 54'	Report

Stadion Feijenoord, Rotterdam
Attendance: 56,000
Referee: Brian McGinlay (Scotland)

14 October 1981

Republic of Ireland	3 – 2	France
Mahut 5' (o.g.); Stapleton 23'; Robinson 39'	Report	Bellone 9'; Platini 83'

Lansdowne Road, Dublin
Attendance: 53,000
Referee: Ulf Eriksson (Sweden)

18 November 1981

France	2 – 0	Netherlands
Platini 52'; Six 82'	Report

Parc des Princes, Paris
Attendance: 46,348
Referee: António Garrido (Portugal)

5 December 1981

France	4 – 0	Cyprus
Rocheteau 25'; Lacombe 29', 82'; Genghini 86'	Report

Parc des Princes, Paris
Attendance: 43,437
Referee: Edwin Borg (Malta)
