= UEFA Euro 1984 qualifying Group 7 =

Standings and results for Group 7 of the UEFA Euro 1984 qualifying tournament.

Group 7 consisted of Iceland, Malta, Netherlands, Republic of Ireland and Spain. The group winners were Spain, who won the group ahead of the Netherlands on goals scored following a 12–1 win over Malta.

== Final table ==
Pos	Team	Pld	W	D	L	GF	GA	GD	Pts	Qualification	(Spain)	(Netherlands)	(Republic of Ireland)	(Iceland)	(Malta)
1	Spain	8	6	1	1	24	8	+16	13	Qualify for final tournament	—	1–0	2–0	1–0	12–1
2	Netherlands	8	6	1	1	22	6	+16	13		2–1	—	2–1	3–0	5–0
3	Republic of Ireland	8	4	1	3	20	10	+10	9		3–3	2–3	—	2–0	8–0
4	Iceland	8	1	1	6	3	13	−10	3		0–1	1–1	0–3	—	1–0
5	Malta	8	1	0	7	5	37	−32	2		2–3	0–6	0–1	2–1	—

Source: UEFA
Rules for classification: Qualification tiebreakers

== Results ==
5 June 1982

Malta	2–1	Iceland
Spiteri Gonzi 44'; Fabri 48'	Report	Geirsson 51' (pen.)

Stadio Comunale Giovanni Celeste, Messina
Attendance: 1,271
Referee: Pietro D'Elia (Italy)

1 September 1982

Iceland	1–1	Netherlands
Eðvaldsson 49'	Report	Schoenaker 51'

Laugardalsvöllur, Reykjavík
Attendance: 2,862
Referee: Brian McGinlay (Scotland)

22 September 1982

Netherlands	2–1	Republic of Ireland
Schoenaker 1'; Gullit 64'	Report	Daly 80'

De Kuip, Rotterdam
Attendance: 20,498
Referee: Ivan Gregr (Czechoslovakia)

13 October 1982

Republic of Ireland	2–0	Iceland
Stapleton 36'; Grealish 75'	Report

Lansdowne Road, Dublin
Attendance: 23,371
Referee: Paul Rion (Luxembourg)

27 October 1982

Spain	1–0	Iceland
Pedraza 60'	Report

Estadio La Rosaleda, Málaga
Attendance: 15,132
Referee: Mario da Silva Luis (Portugal)

17 November 1982

Republic of Ireland	3–3	Spain
Grimes 2'; Stapleton 64', 76'	Report	Maceda 31'; Martin 47' (o.g.); Muñoz 60'

Lansdowne Road, Dublin
Attendance: 35,088
Referee: Jan Redelfs (West Germany)

19 December 1982

Malta	0–6	Netherlands
	Report	Ophof 22' (pen.); Van Kooten 25', 71'; Hovenkamp 34'; Schoenaker 39', 51'

Tivoli Stadium, Aachen
Attendance: 15,634
Referee: Dieter Pauly (West Germany)

16 February 1983

Spain	1–0	Netherlands
Señor 44' (pen.)	Report

Estadio Ramón Sánchez Pizjuán, Seville
Attendance: 30,499
Referee: Paolo Bergamo (Italy)

30 March 1983

Malta	0–1	Republic of Ireland
	Report	Stapleton 89'

Ta' Qali National Stadium, Ta' Qali
Attendance: 6,487
Referee: Adolf Mathias (Austria)

27 April 1983

Spain	2–0	Republic of Ireland
Santillana 51'; Rincón 89'	Report

La Romareda, Zaragoza
Attendance: 28,211
Referee: Valeri Butenko (Soviet Union)

15 May 1983

Malta	2–3	Spain
Busuttil 30', 47'	Report	Señor 21'; Carrasco 60'; Gordillo 84'

Ta' Qali National Stadium, Ta' Qali
Attendance: 7,732
Referee: Evangelos Giannakoudakis (Greece)

29 May 1983

Iceland	0–1	Spain
	Report	Maceda 9'

Laugardalsvöllur, Reykjavík
Attendance: 7,055
Referee: Ronald Bridges (Wales)

5 June 1983

Iceland	1–0	Malta
Eðvaldsson 43'	Report

Laugardalsvöllur, Reykjavík
Attendance: 5,718
Referee: Alex Jacobsen (Denmark)

7 September 1983

Netherlands	3–0	Iceland
R. Koeman 17'; Gullit 19'; Houtman 21'	Report

Oosterpark Stadion, Groningen
Attendance: 5,617
Referee: Andrzej Libich (Poland)

21 September 1983

Iceland	0–3	Republic of Ireland
	Report	Waddock 16'; Robinson 21'; Walsh 81'

Laugardalsvöllur, Reykjavík
Attendance: 13,706
Referee: Gérard Biguet (France)

12 October 1983

Republic of Ireland	2–3	Netherlands
Waddock 7'; Brady 35' (pen.)	Report	Gullit 51', 76'; Van Basten 66'

Dalymount Park, Dublin
Attendance: 26,406
Referee: André Daina (Switzerland)

16 November 1983

Netherlands	2–1	Spain
Houtman 26'; Gullit 63'	Report	Santillana 41'

De Kuip, Rotterdam
Attendance: 49,915
Referee: Michel Vautrot (France)

16 November 1983

Republic of Ireland	8–0	Malta
Lawrenson 25', 63'; Stapleton 28' (pen.); O'Callaghan 35'; Sheedy 74'; Brady 76', 84'; Daly 86'	Report

Dalymount Park, Dublin
Attendance: 8,993
Referee: Ole Amundsen (Denmark)

17 December 1983

Netherlands	5–0	Malta
Vanenburg 19'; Wijnstekers 30'; Rijkaard 74', 90'; Houtman 79'	Report

De Kuip, Rotterdam
Attendance: 53,027
Referee: Klaus Peschel (East Germany)

21 December 1983
20:15 CET

Spain	12–1	Malta
Santillana 15', 26', 28', 75'; Rincón 46', 55', 63', 78'; Maceda 60', 62'; Sarabia 79'; Señor 84'	Report	Degiorgio 24'

Estadio Benito Villamarín, Seville
Attendance: 18,871
Referee: Erkan Göksel (Turkey)

== Goalscorers ==
There were 74 goals scored in 20 matches, for an average of 3.7 goals per match.

6 goals

- (Spain national football team) Santillana

5 goals

- (Netherlands national football team) Ruud Gullit
- (Republic of Ireland national football team) Frank Stapleton
- (Spain national football team) Hipólito Rincón

4 goals

- (Netherlands national football team) Dick Schoenaker
- (Spain national football team) Antonio Maceda

3 goals

- (Netherlands national football team) Peter Houtman
- (Spain national football team) Juan Antonio Señor

2 goals

- (Iceland national football team) Atli Eðvaldsson
- (Malta national football team) Carmel Busuttil
- (Netherlands national football team) Frank Rijkaard
- (Netherlands national football team) Cees van Kooten
- (Republic of Ireland national football team) Liam Brady
- (Republic of Ireland national football team) Gerry Daly
- (Republic of Ireland national football team) Mark Lawrenson
- (Republic of Ireland national football team) Kevin Sheedy
- (Republic of Ireland national football team) Gary Waddock

1 goal

- (Iceland national football team) Marteinn Geirsson
- (Malta national football team) Silvio Demanuele
- (Malta national football team) Emanuel Fabri
- (Malta national football team) Ernest Spiteri-Gonzi
- (Netherlands national football team) Bud Brocken
- (Netherlands national football team) Hugo Hovenkamp
- (Netherlands national football team) Ronald Koeman
- (Netherlands national football team) Edo Ophof
- (Netherlands national football team) Marco van Basten
- (Netherlands national football team) Ben Wijnstekers
- (Republic of Ireland national football team) Tony Grealish
- (Republic of Ireland national football team) Ashley Grimes
- (Republic of Ireland national football team) Kevin O'Callaghan
- (Republic of Ireland national football team) Michael Robinson
- (Republic of Ireland national football team) Mickey Walsh
- (Spain national football team) Lobo Carrasco
- (Spain national football team) Rafael Gordillo
- (Spain national football team) Víctor Muñoz
- (Spain national football team) Juan Carlos Pedraza
- (Spain national football team) Manuel Sarabia

1 own goal

- (Republic of Ireland national football team) Mick Martin (against Spain)

== See also ==
- Spain 12–1 Malta
