= Mark Lawrenson =

Republic of Ireland international footballer

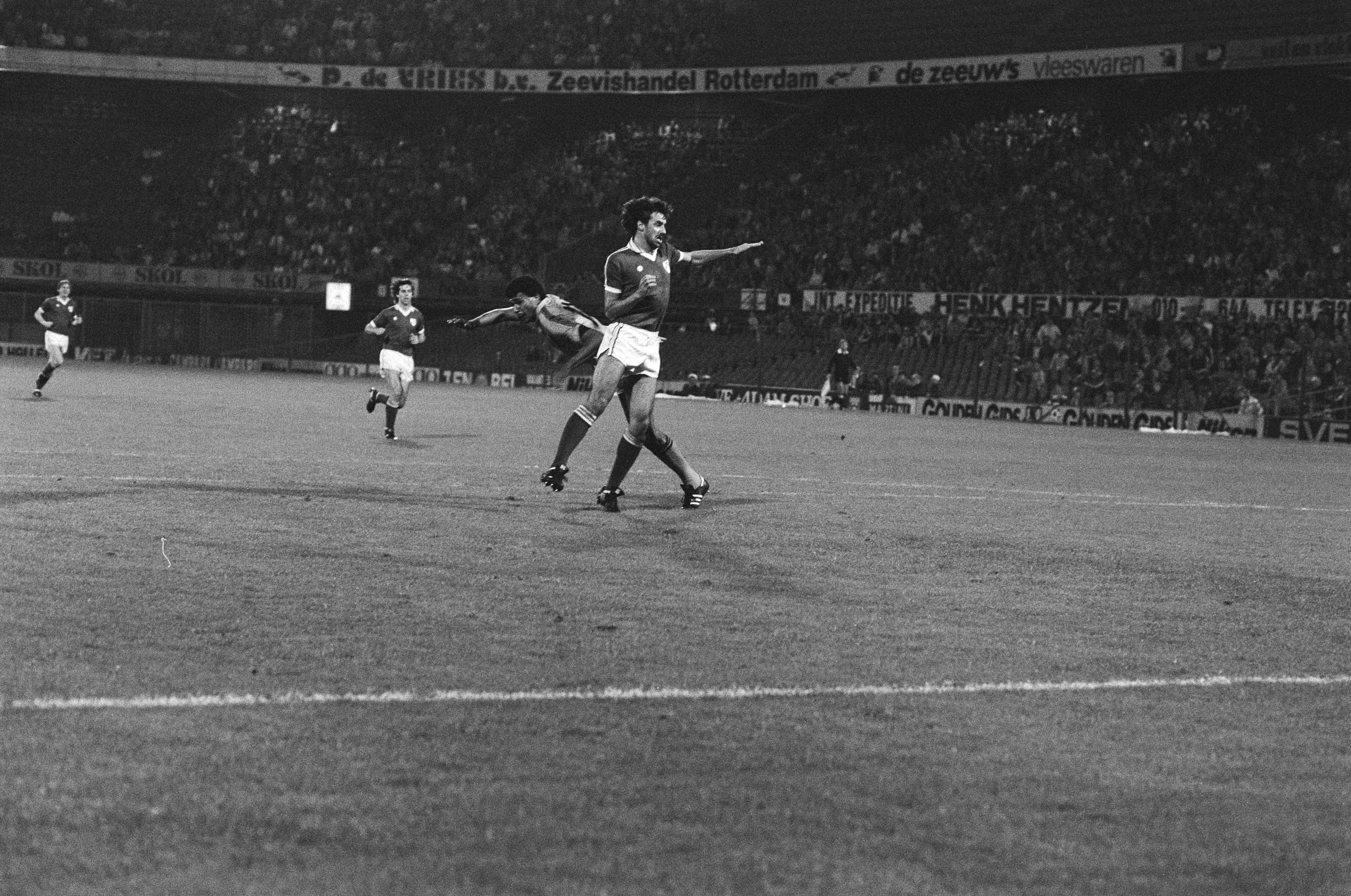
- Lawrenson (right) playing for the Republic of Ireland in 1982

Personal information
- Full name: Mark Thomas Lawrenson
- Date of birth: 2 June 1957 (age 69)
- Place of birth: Preston, Lancashire, England
- Height: 6 ft 0 in (1.83 m)
- Position: Defender

Senior career*
Years	Team	Apps	(Gls)
1974–1977	Preston North End	73	(2)
1977–1981	Brighton & Hove Albion	152	(5)
1981–1988	Liverpool	332	(11)
1988–1989	Barnet	2	(0)
1989	Tampa Bay Rowdies	20	(3)
1990–1991	Corby Town		
1992	Chesham United		
Total		488	(21)

International career
1977–1987	Republic of Ireland	39	(5)

Managerial career
- 1988: Oxford United
- 1989–1990: Peterborough United
- * Club domestic league appearances and goals

Mark Thomas Lawrenson (born 2 June 1957) is a former professional footballer who played as a defender. He is best known for his time at Liverpool, during the 1980s. After a short career as a manager, he then became a radio, television and internet pundit, most prominently with the BBC, until his retirement in 2022. Born and raised in England, Lawrenson qualified to play for the Republic of Ireland through his grandfather, Thomas Crotty, who was born in Waterford.

== Club career ==
=== Preston and Brighton ===
Mark Lawrenson was born in Preston and attended St Teresa's Catholic Primary School in Penwortham and, later, Preston Catholic College, a Jesuit school. His father, Tom, had been a winger for Preston North End. He always wanted to be a footballer, although his mother, Theresa, wanted him to become a priest. He began his career, as a 17-year-old, with his hometown club in 1974, who were then managed by World Cup winner Bobby Charlton. Lawrenson was voted Preston's Player of the Year for the 1976–77 season.

After 73 league appearances for the Deepdale club, he moved to Alan Mullery's Brighton & Hove Albion in the summer before the start of the 1977–78 season for £100,000. Ironically, the then Second Division side outbid First Division Liverpool who also showed interest in the 19-year-old Lawrenson. Lawrenson made his Brighton debut on 20 August 1977 in a 1–1 draw against Southampton at The Dell. He settled in at the Goldstone Ground and made 40 league appearances by the end of his first season of the club. He went on to make 152 league appearances by the end of the 1980–81 season. However the club entered a financial crisis in 1981 and Lawrenson was forced to leave the club to make funds available. A number of clubs were interested in signing Lawrenson after his resilient performances for both Preston and Brighton, but it was Liverpool manager Bob Paisley who secured his signature.

=== Liverpool ===
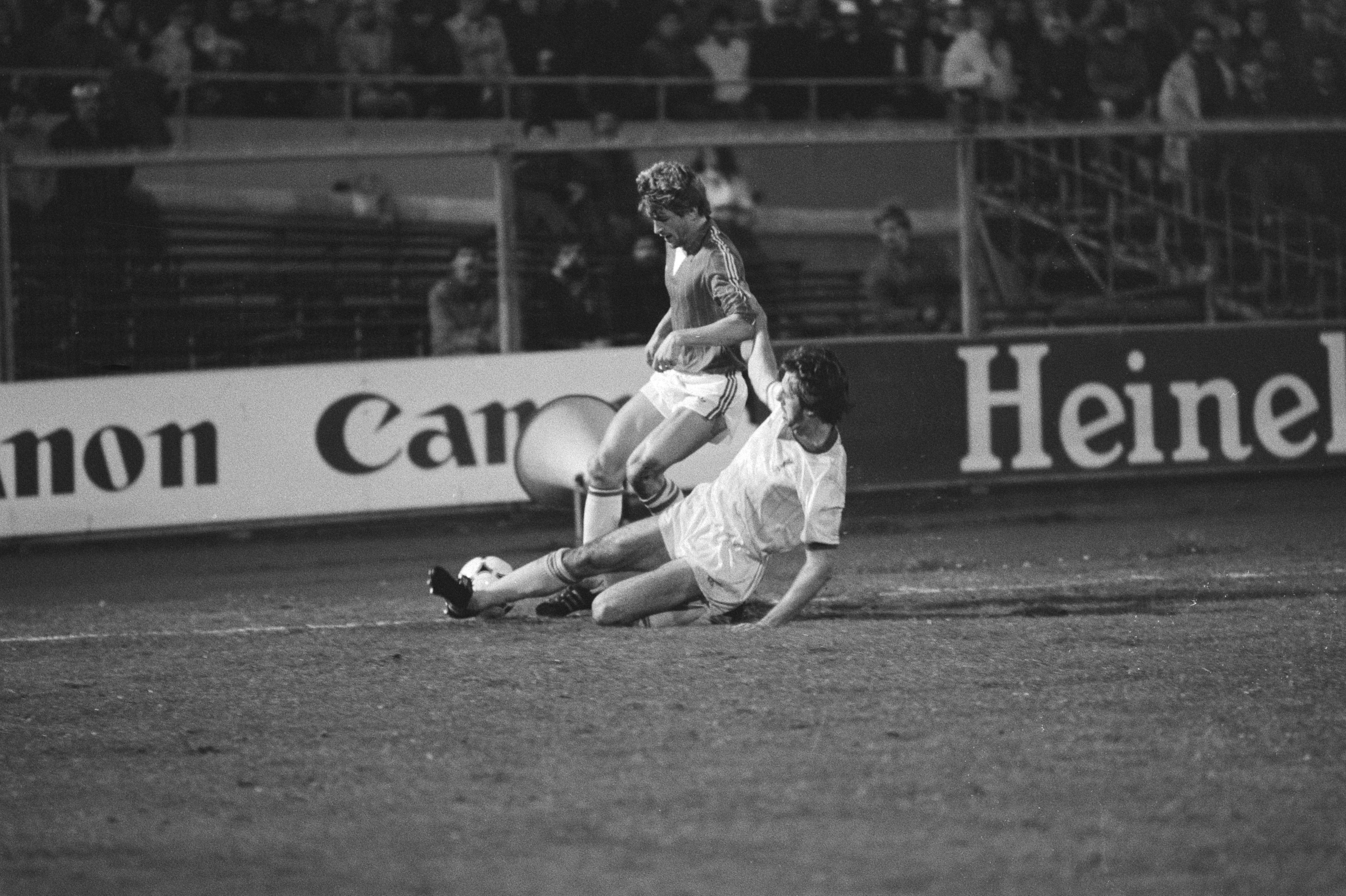
Lawrenson in 1981, tackling AZ's Hugo Hovenkamp

Liverpool offered a club transfer record of £900,000, and Lawrenson joined in the summer of 1981. He was to form a formidable central defensive partnership with Alan Hansen after Phil Thompson suffered an injury. He was also used occasionally at left-back. He made his first start for the team at left-back in a 1–0 league defeat at the hands of Wolverhampton Wanderers at Molineux on 29 August 1981. He scored his first goal a month later during the 7–0 European Cup first round second leg trouncing of Finnish team Oulun Palloseura at Anfield on 30 September. Lawrenson came on for Ray Kennedy in the 64th minute, scoring in the 72nd.

In Lawrenson's first full season, 1981–82, Liverpool won the League championship and the League Cup, defeating Tottenham Hotspur in the final. The team retained both titles for the next two seasons (in the League Cup finals defeating Manchester United in 1983 and Everton in 1984), becoming the third club in history to win three league titles in a row. They also added the club's fourth European Cup in 1984, the last time Liverpool would win Europe's most prestigious club prize until 2005. Lawrenson dislocated his shoulder three weeks before the 1985 European Cup final, the Heysel Stadium disaster. He started the game, which Liverpool lost 1–0 to Juventus, but was injured after a few minutes and had to be substituted.

Lawrenson earned a reputation as an accomplished player and in the 1985–1986 season, he was an integral part of the Liverpool side who completed the third league championship and FA Cup double of the 20th century. They overtook derby rivals Everton to win the league by two points and later came from behind to defeat Everton 3–1 in the 1986 FA Cup final at Wembley. After 1986, Lawrenson's first team place came under threat from the younger Gary Gillespie. Lawrenson's partnership with team captain Hansen continued for one more season before he, already out through a minor injury, suffered Achilles tendon damage in 1988 which prematurely ended his career. He earned a fifth and final title medal when that season ended. His Liverpool career ended after 332 appearances and 18 goals in all competitions – one of which was the fifth goal in a 5–0 defeat of Merseyside rivals Everton on 6 November 1982, a game in which Ian Rush scored four of the five goals.

=== Later career ===
After his time at Liverpool, he was appointed Oxford United manager in 1988. His time at the club was frustrating and he resigned after star striker Dean Saunders was sold by the board of directors without Lawrenson's approval. Over that winter, he made a brief playing comeback in the Football Conference, making two appearances for Barnet, as well as a season with the Florida side Tampa Bay Rowdies in the American Soccer League. Lawrenson also managed Peterborough United from 6 September 1989 until 9 November 1990.

Lawrenson returned to playing with non-league clubs Corby Town and Chesham United. His final season as a player was as part of the Chesham team that won the 1992–93 Isthmian League. The club was not promoted to the then Football Conference as this would have required ground improvements that could not be afforded, so he decided the time was right to retire from playing completely.

== International career ==
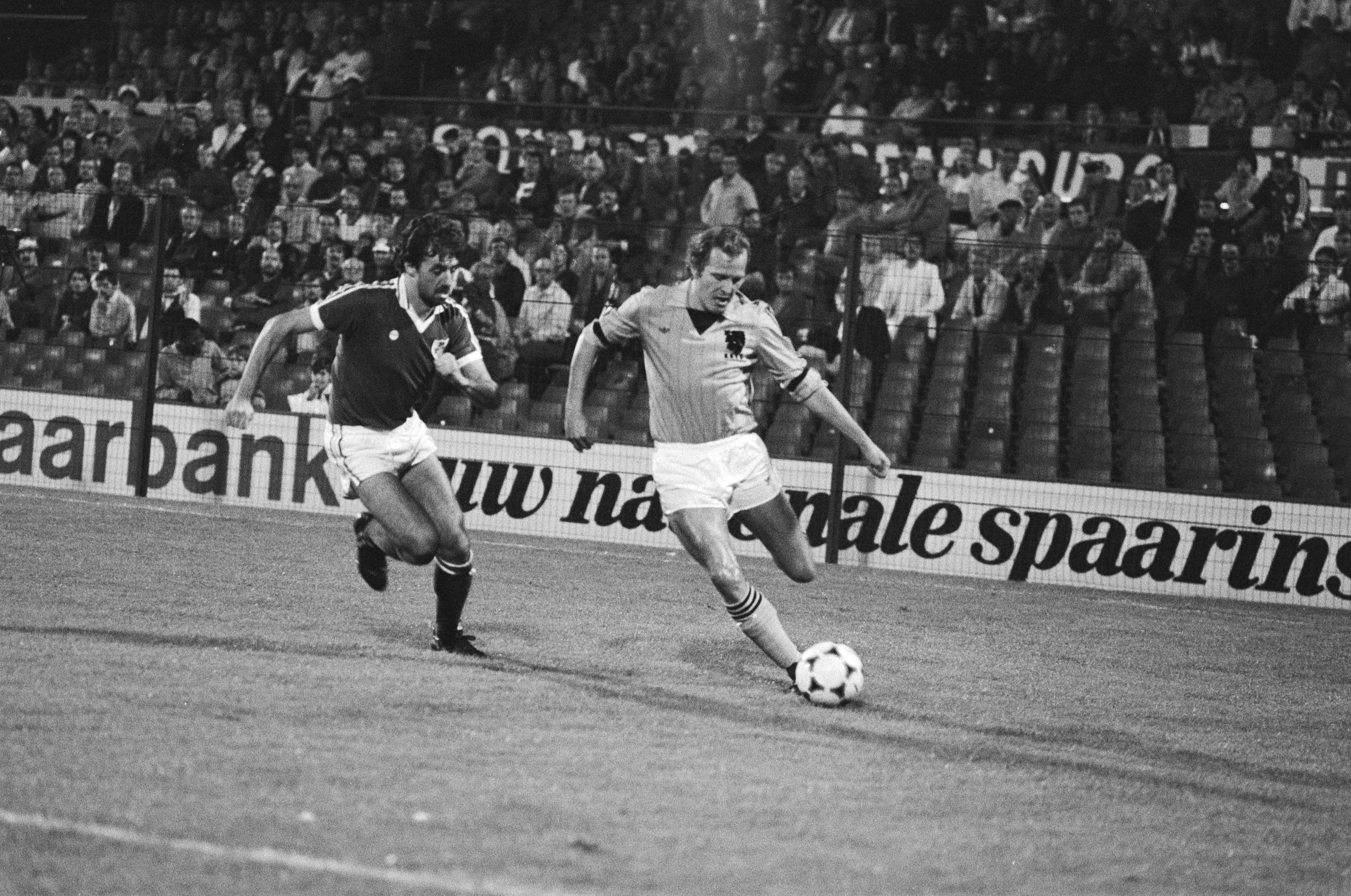
Lawrenson (left) tracking the Netherlands' Willy van de Kerkhof in 1982

After Preston coach (and former Irish international goalkeeper) Alan Kelly became aware of the young player's Irish connections (and informed Irish international manager Johnny Giles), Lawrenson's solid performances earned him a call-up to the Republic of Ireland national team. He won the first of 39 international caps at the age of 19, in a friendly with Poland on 24 April 1977 at Dalymount Park; the game ended 0–0. Ireland employed Lawrenson's versatility and burgeoning talent by playing him at fullback, in midfield, and occasionally in his favoured position at centre half.

Lawrenson played his first competitive match on 12 October 1977 against Bulgaria in a 1978 World Cup qualifier. This match also ended 0–0, at Lansdowne Road (now Aviva Stadium). Lawrenson scored his first of his five goals for Ireland against Cyprus in Nicosia on 26 March 1980 in a 1982 World Cup qualifier. He scored his second goal for Ireland in the next competitive match as Ireland beat Netherlands 2–1 at Lansdowne Road in the same qualification campaign. This was also notable as it was Eoin Hand's first match as manager of Ireland. In between these two matches, Lawrenson renewed his Preston acquaintance with Kelly, as he managed Ireland in a caretaker capacity for a friendly against Switzerland.

Lawrenson scored two goals in Ireland's record victory – an 8–0 thrashing of Malta in a 1984 European Championship qualifier but the Irish goal that he is best remembered for is one against Scotland. It was Jack Charlton's first qualification campaign as Irish manager and Ireland were playing Scotland in Hampden Park in a 1988 Euro qualifier. A sixth-minute goal earned Ireland a precious away victory that went a very long way to helping Ireland to qualify for its first ever major football championship finals. Unfortunately for Lawrenson, injury prevented him from making the Irish Euro 1988 squad for the finals.

Lawrenson played his last match for the Republic of Ireland against Israel on 10 November 1987. It was a friendly match at Dalymount Park and was also notable because David Kelly scored a hat trick on his international debut.

== Media career ==
After retiring from international football Lawrenson wrote for the Irish Times, initially providing analysis for the 1990 FIFA World Cup. Lawrenson began his television career providing match analysis on HTV West's local football coverage, before working as a pundit for the BBC, but then left briefly to become a coach specialising in defensive tactics for Kevin Keegan at Newcastle United, where he admitted in 2017, that "I did nothing. Absolutely nothing". However, the position was again short-lived and he returned to media work. He became established as a pundit, both on BBC television and radio, often finding himself sitting alongside his former defensive partner, Alan Hansen. Since the departure of Trevor Brooking from the BBC, he was the main co-commentator on major national and international (FIFA) matches covered by the television network. He appeared regularly on Football Focus and Match of the Day.

He was also often a co-commentator on BBC Radio 5 Live, often working on the feature matches on Sunday afternoons. He previously worked as a pundit for Ireland's TV3 between 2001 and 2007 for mid-week Champions League games alongside Welsh national team manager and former Liverpool striker, John Toshack. When the Champions League returned to TV3 in 2010, he no longer provided punditry. He was replaced in that role by Tony Cascarino and Martin Keown, and moved into the commentary box alongside TV3 commentator Trevor Welch. He worked for Irish radio station Today FM on Premiership Live with presenter Michael McMullan in talking about football related topics, predicting scores and stating facts. He also had a column on the BBC website where he gave his views and predictions on the Premier League's weekend fixtures. Lawrenson was one of a number of ex-Liverpool players who made up the BBC pundit team.

He also writes a regular Preston North End column for the University of Central Lancashire's Students' Union newspaper, Pluto, and a weekly column for the Liverpool Daily Post. He worked with Japanese entertainment company Konami, recording commentary samples for the Pro Evolution Soccer series, alongside ITV commentator Jon Champion, from Pro Evolution Soccer 2008 to Pro Evolution Soccer 2010. He was replaced by ITV pundit Jim Beglin for Pro Evolution Soccer 2011. In addition, Lawrenson has also featured alongside John Motson as a commentator in EA Sports' FIFA series from 99 through 2001 and on the Euro 2000 video game.

In 2002, Lawrenson made a bet on Football Focus that Bolton Wanderers would be relegated from the Premier League in the 2001–02 season. He lost the bet after Sam Allardyce's team stayed up, and shaved off his moustache as a result.

At the 2014 FIFA World Cup, the BBC received 172 complaints after Lawrenson said that Swiss striker Josip Drmić "should put a skirt on". The channel responded by stating "We acknowledge that the remark by commentator Mark Lawrenson about Switzerland's Josip Drmić was inappropriate and we apologise for any offence caused by it".

At the end of the 2021–22 Premier League season, and after a 30-year stint with the BBC, during which he covered a total of six World Cups, Lawrenson was told by the football head his typical one-year contract would not be renewed. He subsequently claimed that the cause was ostensibly BBC's "woke culture". He stated that a "very early woke moment" occurred 25 years previously, in the aftermath of the death of Diana, Princess of Wales, when an editor allegedly told him to "not mention the wall" if describing free kicks in a forthcoming match.

== Personal life ==
In 2003, Lawrenson was awarded an Honorary Fellowship from Myerscough College near Preston for his achievements in football.

In 2018, he was given the all-clear after having a cancerous growth removed from his face. He was made aware of the seriousness of the growth when a concerned viewer contacted the editor of Football Focus. Lawrenson later met the viewer, Dr Alan Brennan, on television.

== Career statistics ==
=== Club ===
Appearances and goals by club, season and competition
Club	Season	League			FA Cup		League Cup		Europe		Other		Total	
Club	Season	Division	Apps	Goals	Apps	Goals	Apps	Goals	Apps	Goals	Apps	Goals	Apps	Goals
Preston North End	1974–75	Third Division	3	0					–		–		3	0
Preston North End	1975–76	Third Division	24	0					–		–		24	0
Preston North End	1976–77	Third Division	46	2					–		–		46	2
Preston North End	Total		73	2					—		—		73	2
Brighton & Hove Albion	1977–78	Second Division	40	1					–		–		40	1
Brighton & Hove Albion	1978–79	Second Division	39	2					–		–		39	2
Brighton & Hove Albion	1979–80	First Division	33	1					–		–		33	1
Brighton & Hove Albion	1980–81	First Division	40	1					–		–		40	1
Brighton & Hove Albion	Total		152	5					—		—		152	5
Liverpool	1981–82	First Division	39	2	3	1	10	0	6 (Note: Appearances in European Cup)	1	1 (Note: Appearance in Intercontinental Cup)	0	59	4
Liverpool	1982–83	First Division	40	5	3	0	8	2	3	0	1 (Note: Appearance in FA Charity Shield)	0	55	7
Liverpool	1983–84	First Division	42	0	2	0	12	0	9	0	1	0	66	0
Liverpool	1984–85	First Division	33	1	4	0	2	0	9	1	2 (Note: One appearance in FA Charity Shield, one appearance in European Super Cup)	0	50	2
Liverpool	1985–86	First Division	38	3	7	1	7	0	–		6 (Note: Appearances in Football League Super Cup)	1	58	5
Liverpool	1986–87	First Division	35	0	3	0	8	0	–		3 (Note: One appearance in FA Charity Shield, two appearances in Football League Super Cup)	0	49	0
Liverpool	1987–88	First Division	14	0	2	0	3	0	–		–		19	0
Liverpool	Total		241	11	24	2	50	2	27	2	14	1	356	18
Career total			466	18	24	2	50	2	27	2	14	1	581	25

=== International ===
Republic of Ireland
Year	Apps	Goals
1977	2	0
1978	5	0
1979	0	0
1980	7	2
1981	3	0
1982	3	0
1983	5	2
1984	4	0
1985	6	0
1986	1	0
1987	3	1
Total	39	5

International goals

Lawrenson – goals for Ireland
#	Date	Venue	Opponent	Score	Result	Competition
1.	26 March 1980	Makario Stadium, Nicosia, Cyprus	Cyprus	0–2	2–3	World Cup 1982 qualifier
2.	10 September 1980	Lansdowne Road, Dublin, Ireland	Netherlands	2–1	2–1	World Cup 1982 qualifier
3.	16 November 1983	Dalymount Park, Dublin, Ireland	Malta	1–0	8–0	Euro 1984 qualifier
4.	16 November 1983	Dalymount Park, Dublin, Ireland	Malta	4–0	8–0	Euro 1984 qualifier
5.	18 February 1987	Hampden Park, Glasgow, Scotland	Scotland	0–1	0–1	Euro 1988 qualifier

== Managerial statistics ==
Team	Nat	From	To	Record				
Team	Nat	From	To	G	W	D	L	Win %
Oxford United	(England)	24 March 1988	25 October 1988	25	4	9	12	16.00
Peterborough United	(England)	6 September 1989	9 November 1990	64	25	23	16	39.06
Total				89	29	32	28	32.6

== Honours ==
Liverpool

- Football League First Division: 1981–82, 1982–83, 1983–84, 1985–86, 1987–88
- FA Cup: 1985–86
- Football League Cup: 1981–82, 1982–83, 1983–84
- FA Charity Shield: 1982, 1986
- Football League Super Cup: 1986
- European Cup: 1983–84

Individual

- PFA Team of the Year: 1978–79 Second Division, 1982–83 First Division, 1983–84 First Division, 1984–85 First Division, 1985–86 First Division

== See also ==
- List of Republic of Ireland international footballers born outside the Republic of Ireland
