= Spain 12–1 Malta =

Spain v Malta (1983)
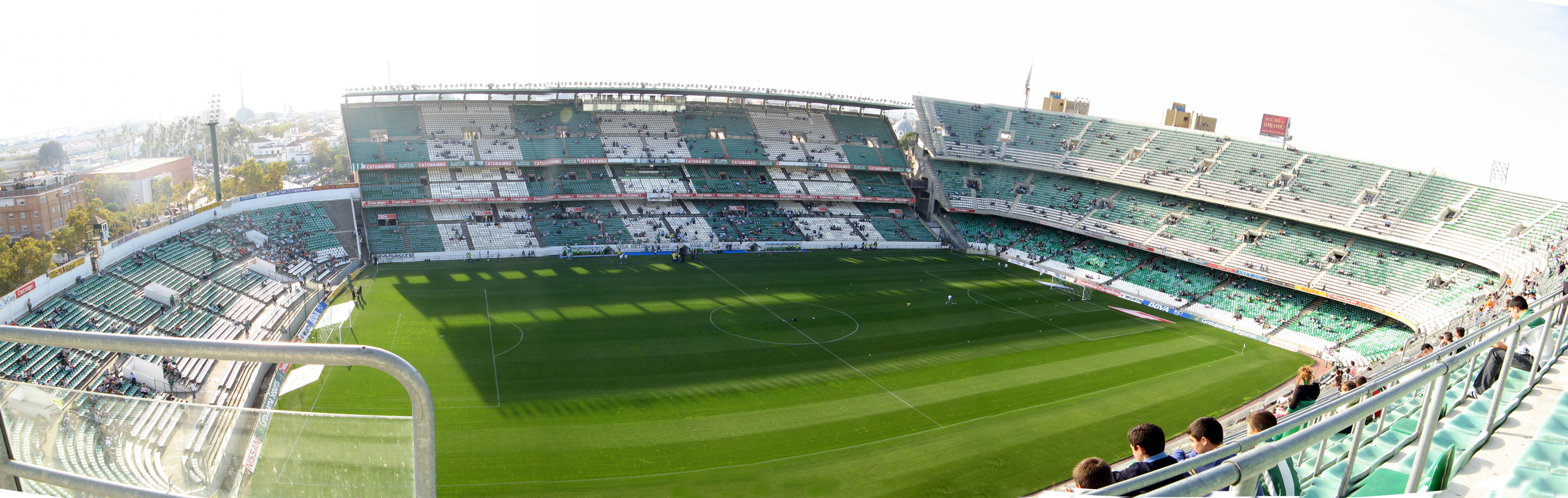
- The Estadio Benito Villamarín in Seville hosted the match
- Event: UEFA Euro 1984 qualifying Group 7 Matchday 8
Spain	Malta
12	1
- Spain qualified for UEFA Euro 1984
- Date: 21 December 1983
- Venue: Estadio Benito Villamarín, Seville
- Referee: Erkan Göksel (Turkey)
- Attendance: 18,871

On 21 December 1983, Spain played Malta in the last qualification match for UEFA Euro 1984. Needing a victory by no less than 11 goals to qualify, Spain won the match 12–1. The game is often described as one of the most important in the Spanish national team's history.

== Background ==
With only the group winner getting a spot in the finals, the Netherlands had defeated Malta 5–0 four days before, and had finished their qualification schedule on top of the group with 13 points and a goal difference of +16.

By winning their final qualifier Spain would also finish on 13 points, and goal difference would decide the group winner. Spain's goal difference was +5 before the match; if it also reached +16, then the total number of goals scored by Spain would surpass that of the Netherlands, putting Spain ahead. Therefore, the team needed a win by a margin of 11 or more goals.

Spain had only managed to score 12 goals in their seven matches in the group until then. Before the game the Maltese goalkeeper John Bonello said: "I wouldn't return to my country if they scored 11 goals."

Going into the match, the Group 7 table stood as follows:

Pos	Team	Pld	W	D	L	GF	GA	GD	Pts	Qualification
1	Netherlands	8	6	1	1	22	6	+16	13	Qualify for final tournament
2	Spain	7	5	1	1	12	7	+5	11	
3	Republic of Ireland (E)	8	4	1	3	20	10	+10	9	
4	Iceland (E)	8	1	1	6	3	13	−10	3	
5	Malta (E)	7	1	0	6	4	25	−21	2	

Updated to match(es) played on 17 December 1983. Source: UEFA
Rules for classification: Qualification tiebreakers
(E) Eliminated

== Match ==
=== Summary ===
Spain's only chance of qualifying for Euro 1984 was to defeat Malta by at least 11 goals. In the second minute of the match, Spain were awarded a penalty in the fourth minute after a foul on Lobo Carrasco inside the box. However, the resulting kick by Juan Señor hit the post and was cleared by a Maltese defender for a corner. After Santillana opened the scoring for Spain in the 15th minute, Malta's Michael Degiorgio levelled the score 1–1 in the 24th minute.

When half-time came and the scoreline was 3–1 to Spain, few expected them to score enough goals to qualify. However, Juan Señor, who had missed the early penalty, scored Spain's 12th and last goal in the 88th minute; Rafael Gordillo nearly scored a 13th in the final minutes of the game but it was disallowed by the referee. That did not matter, however, as the Spaniards won by the 11-goal margin required for them to beat the Netherlands to qualification.

=== Details ===
21 December 1983
20:15 CET

Spain	12–1	Malta
Santillana 15', 26', 28', 75'; Rincón 46', 55', 63', 78'; Maceda 60', 62'; Sarabia 79'; Señor 84'	Report	Degiorgio 24'

Estadio Benito Villamarín, Seville
Attendance: 18,871
Referee: Erkan Göksel (Turkey)

Spain	Malta

GK	1	Francisco Buyo
RB	7	Lobo Carrasco
CB	5	Andoni Goikoetxea
CB	4	Antonio Maceda	(yellow card) 52'
LB	3	José Antonio Camacho (c)
RM	11	Hipólito Rincón		(substituted off) 88'
CM	2	Juan Señor
CM	8	Víctor Muñoz
LM	6	Rafael Gordillo	(yellow card) 25'
CF	10	Manuel Sarabia
CF	9	Santillana
Substitutions:
FW	16	Marcos Alonso		(substituted on) 88'
Manager:
Miguel Muñoz

GK	1	John Bonello	(yellow card) 50'
DF	2	Emanuel Farrugia
DF	3	Alex Azzopardi
DF	5	John Holland (c)
DF	6	Norman Buttigieg
MF	7	Silvio Demanuele
MF	10	Emanuel Fabri	(yellow card) 34'
MF	11	Michael Degiorgio	(yellow card) 3' (yellow-red card) 76'
FW	4	Simon Tortell	(yellow card) 23'
FW	8	Ray Farrugia		(substituted off) 70'
FW	9	Ernest Spiteri-Gonzi
Substitutions:
DF	14	Mario Farrugia		(substituted on) 76'
Manager:
Victor Scerri

Assistant referees:
Yahya Diker (Turkey)
Özcan Oal (Turkey)

Match rules

- 90 minutes.
- Maximum of two substitutions.

== Aftermath ==
The match was broadcast by Televisión Española in Spain. Many in Malta claimed that the Maltese were paid to not play their best and to let Spain win by a large margin. It was also rumoured that words had been exchanged between Maltese and Spanish officials and players at half-time. In March 2018, two Maltese players, Silvio Demanuele and Carmel Busuttil, claimed that Spain had been using doping as "they had foam in their mouths and could not stop drinking water". They also claim the Maltese players were drugged via lemon wedges during halftime. However, as of 2018, no evidence has come forth to support these allegations.

The Malta Football Association launched an inquiry into the result and its chairman George Abela—future president of Malta—brought about changes to the national team. Abela said that a lack of facilities meant that the team lacked serious professional preparation for a tournament such as the European Championships, while the closeness of away fixtures—Malta had played in the Netherlands only four days before their 12–1 loss in Seville—was a further hindrance and such scheduling would be avoided in the future.

In the final tournament, Spain finished as runners-up to hosts France.

== Final table ==
Spain and the Netherlands finished the qualification stage level on 13 points, level on goal difference, but Spain qualified on goals scored (24, compared to 22 for the Netherlands).

Pos	Team	Pld	W	D	L	GF	GA	GD	Pts	Qualification
1	Spain	8	6	1	1	24	8	+16	13	Qualify for final tournament
2	Netherlands	8	6	1	1	22	6	+16	13	
3	Republic of Ireland	8	4	1	3	20	10	+10	9	
4	Iceland	8	1	1	6	3	13	−10	3	
5	Malta	8	1	0	7	5	37	−32	2	

Source: UEFA
Rules for classification: Qualification tiebreakers

== Records ==
- The match produced the second-largest win in Spain's history (the largest was 13–0 against Bulgaria in 1933), and Malta's largest loss.
- The four goals scored by Santillana put him as the top goalscorer in qualifying group 7.

== See also ==
- UEFA Euro 1984 qualifying Group 7
- Spain national football team results
