= John Bonello =

John Bonello may refer to:

- John Bonello (footballer) (born 1958), Maltese footballer
- John Bonello (referee), Canadian professional wrestler and referee
