= Cluytens =

Cluytens is a surname. Notable people with the surname include:

- Albert Cluytens (born 1955), Belgian footballer
- André Cluytens (1905–1967), Belgian-born French conductor
