= Mario Schembri (Maltese footballer, born 1956) =

Maltese footballer (born 1956)

Personal information
- Date of birth: 10 August 1956
- Place of birth: Żurrieq, Malta
- Date of death: 7 March 2008 (aged 51)
- Position: Winger

Youth career
- 1970-1974: Żurrieq

Senior career*
Years	Team	Apps	(Gls)
1974–1987	Żurrieq		
1987–1989	Valletta		

International career^{‡}
1986–1987	Malta	3	(0)
- * Club domestic league appearances and goals as of 31 March 2024 ‡ National team caps and goals as of 31 March 2024

Mario Schembri (10 August 1956 – 7 March 2008) was a footballer, who represented the Malta national team. He died, aged 51, in March 2008.

== Club career ==
Born in Żurrieq, Schembri played a long part of his career as a winger for the local village team. Nicknamed 'Bufon' and playing alongside another club legend Mario Farrugia, he won the Second Division title in 1980 and the FA Trophy in 1985 with the club.

== International career ==
Schembri made his debut for Malta in a November 1986 European Championship qualification match against Sweden and earned a total of 3 caps (no goals). His final international was a December 1987 friendly match away against Israel.

== Honours ==
Żurrieq

- FA Trophy: 1

1985
