= Dick Nanninga =

Dutch footballer (1949–2015)

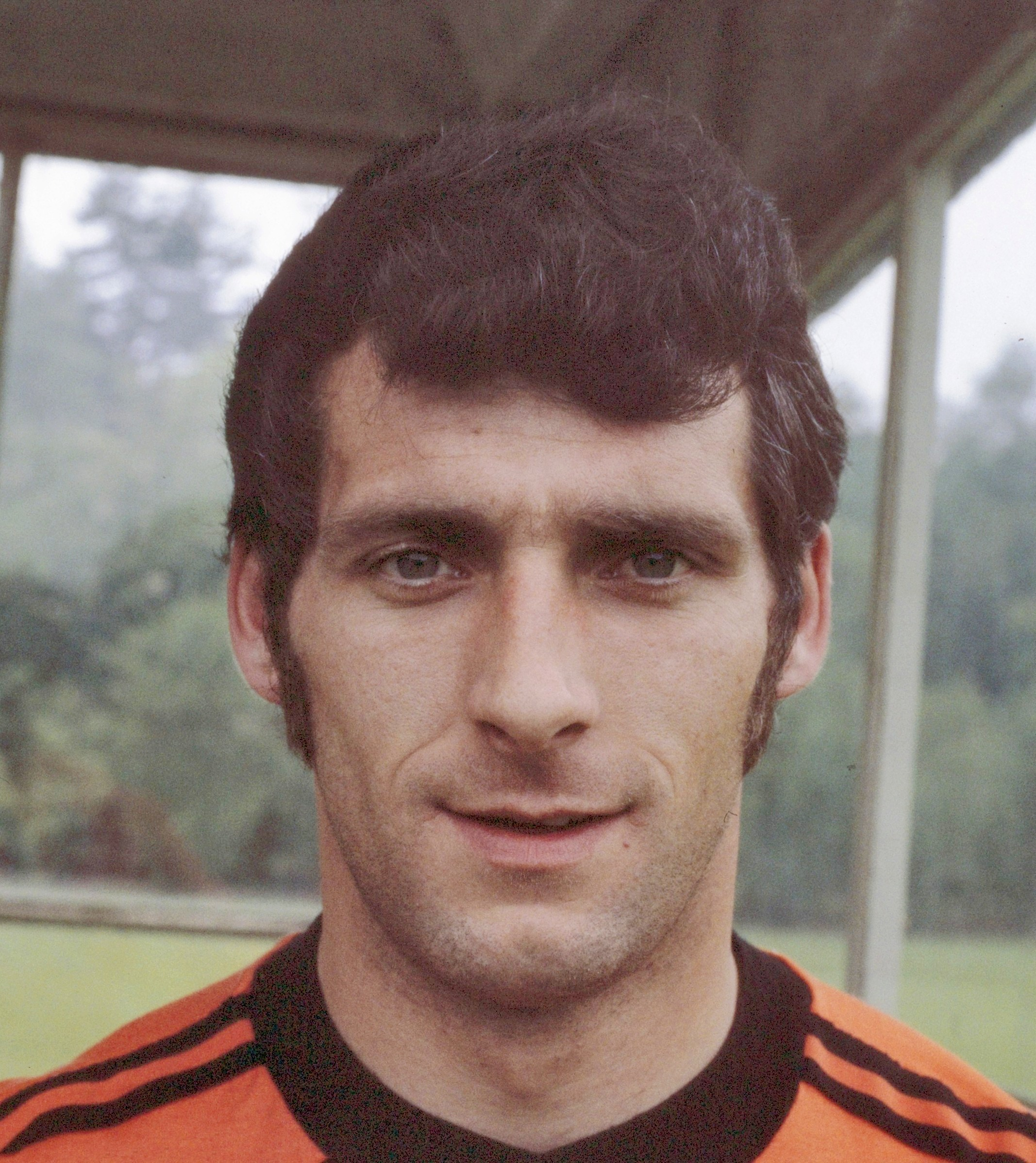
- Nanninga in 1978

Personal information
- Full name: Dirk Jacobus Willem Nanninga
- Date of birth: 17 January 1949
- Place of birth: Groningen, Netherlands
- Date of death: 21 July 2015 (aged 66)
- Place of death: Maaseik, Belgium
- Position: Forward

Senior career*
| Years | Team | Apps | (Gls) |
| 1973–1974 | Veendam | 31 | (15) |
| 1974–1982 | Roda JC | 225 | (107) |
| 1982–1983 | Seiko | 28 | (15) |
| 1983–1986 | MVV | 67 | (26) |
| Total | | 343 | (150) |

International career
| 1978–1981 | Netherlands | 15 | (6) |
Medal record
Men's football
Representing Netherlands
FIFA World Cup
| Runner-up | 1978 |
- * Club domestic league appearances and goals

Dirk Jacobus Willem "Dick" Nanninga (17 January 1949 – 21 July 2015) was a Dutch footballer who played as a forward. At club level, he played for Dutch sides BV Veendam, Roda JC and MVV Maastricht. He also had a short spell with Hong Kong club Seiko. At international level, he represented the Netherlands at the 1978 FIFA World Cup and UEFA Euro 1980.

== Career ==
Nanninga earned 15 caps and scored 6 goals for the Netherlands national football team. In the 1978 FIFA World Cup final against Argentina in Buenos Aires, he scored the equalizing goal in normal time, but Argentina went on to win 3–1 in extra time.

In the same World Cup, Nanninga became the first substitute player to be sent off, 7 minutes after coming on against West Germany. He and Bernd Hölzenbein clashed as the Dutch took a free kick and Nanninga was shown the yellow card. He was then reported to have laughed at the referee's decision. Confusion reigned, as he was ordered off.

He is Roda JC's all time topscorer having scored 107 goals in 225 matches for the Kerkrade-based club.

== Health issues and death ==
In 2012, Nanninga went into a coma and only regained consciousness five months later. Due to diabetes his left lower leg had to be amputated. In 2014 his right lower leg also had to be amputated. His death was announced on 21 July 2015.

== Career statistics ==
=== International ===
Appearances and goals by national team and year
| National team | Year | Apps | Goals |
|---|---|---|---|
| Netherlands | 1978 | 7 | 3 |
| Netherlands | 1979 | 2 | 2 |
| Netherlands | 1980 | 5 | 0 |
| Netherlands | 1981 | 1 | 1 |
| Total | | 15 | 6 |

Scores and results list the Netherlands' goal tally first, score column indicates score after each Nanninga goal.

List of international goals scored by Dick Nanninga
| No. | Date | Venue | Opponent | Score | Result | Competition |
|---|---|---|---|---|---|---|
| 1 | 5 April 1978 | Stade Olympique El Menzah, Tunis, Tunesia | Tunisia | 1–0 | 4–0 | Friendly |
| 2 | 5 April 1978 | Stade Olympique El Menzah, Tunis, Tunesia | Tunisia | 3–0 | 4–0 | Friendly |
| 3 | 25 June 1978 | Estadio Monumental, Buenos Aires, Argentina | Argentina | 1–1 | 1–3 | 1978 FIFA World Cup final |
| 4 | 5 September 1979 | Laugardalsvöllur, Reykjavík, Iceland | Iceland | 3–0 | 4–0 | UEFA Euro 1980 qualification |
| 5 | 5 September 1979 | Laugardalsvöllur, Reykjavík, Iceland | Iceland | 4–0 | 4–0 | UEFA Euro 1980 qualification |
| 6 | 22 February 1981 | Stadion Oosterpark, Groningen, Netherlands | Cyprus | 3–0 | 3–0 | 1982 FIFA World Cup qualification |

== Honours ==
- FIFA World Cup: runner-up 1978
