= Mario Farrugia =

Maltese footballer (born 1955)

Personal information
- Date of birth: 10 March 1955 (age 71)
- Place of birth: Żurrieq, Malta
- Height: 1.67 m (5 ft 6 in)
- Position: Defender

Senior career*
Years	Team	Apps	(Gls)
1972-1984	Żurrieq	54+	(10+)
1985	Hibernians	8	(0)
1985-1991	Żurrieq	84	(8)
1991-1992	Marsa		
1992-1994	Żurrieq	9+	(0+)
1994-1996	Qrendi		

International career^{‡}
1981–1983	Malta	12	(0)
- * Club domestic league appearances and goals as of 14 February 2010 ‡ National team caps and goals as of 14 February 2010

Mario Farrugia (born 10 March 1955) is a Maltese former professional footballer, during his career he played for Żurrieq, where he played as a defender.

== Club career ==
Farrugia was even-present for Żurrieq between 1972 and 1978 and is the only Żurrieq player who has ever scored in European competition when he netted in the first round of the 1982–83 UEFA Cup against Hajduk Split. Playing alongside another club legend, Mario Schembri, he won the Second Division title in 1980 with the club.

== International career ==
Farrugia made his debut for Malta in a November 1981 World Cup qualification match away against East Germany and earned a total of 12 caps. (no goals). He was the first Żurrieq player ever to play for the national team and made six appearances during the UEFA Euro 1984 qualifying rounds, making his final international appearance in the infamous December 1983 European Championship qualification defeat by Spain, which Malta lost 1–12, ensuring that Spain qualified for Euro 1984 ahead of the Netherlands.

== Honours ==
Żurrieq

- Maltese First Division: 1993
- Maltese Second Division: 1980

Marsa

- Maltese Second Division: 1992

Qrendi

- Maltese Third Division: 1996
