= Cees van Kooten =

Dutch footballer

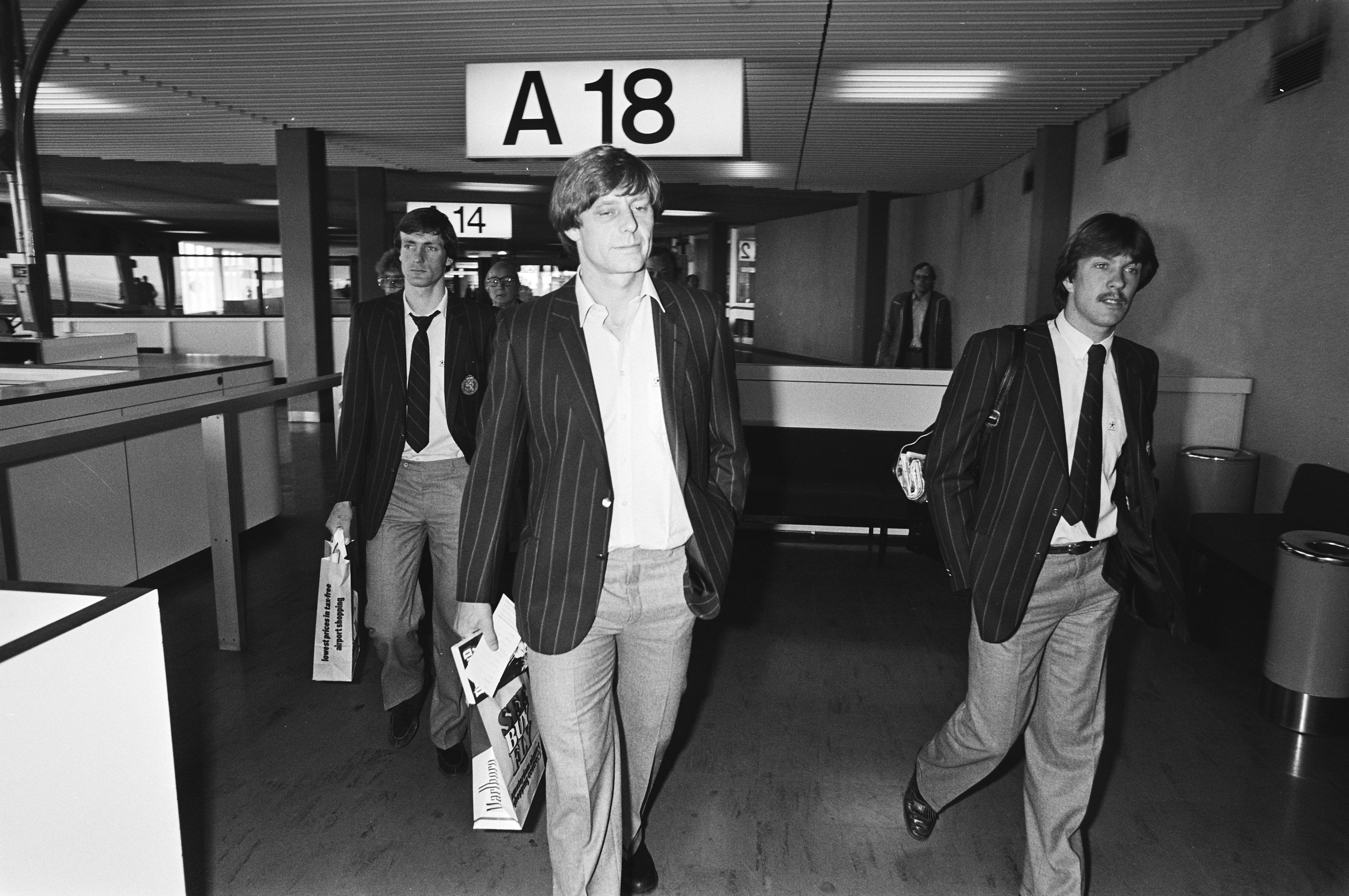
- Cees van Kooten and Ben Wijnstekers (right) at Schiphol, 27 April 1981

Personal information
- Full name: Cornelis van Kooten
- Date of birth: 20 August 1948
- Place of birth: Alblasserdam, Netherlands
- Date of death: 24 August 2015 (aged 67)
- Place of death: Deventer, Netherlands
- Position: Striker

Senior career*
Years	Team	Apps	(Gls)
1965–1970	Hermes DVS		
1970–1971	FC Utrecht		
1971–1972	Lille		
1971–1976	Telstar		
1976–1982	Go Ahead Eagles		
1983–1985	PEC Zwolle		

International career
1981–1983	Netherlands	9	(4)

Managerial career
- 1994–1995: NEC
- 1996: RKC
- * Club domestic league appearances and goals

Cees van Kooten (Dutch pronunciation: [ˈkeːs fɑŋ ˈkoːtə(n)]; 20 August 1948 – 24 August 2015) was a Dutch former international football striker. After his career he became a football manager, he retired after a heart attack. He died of cancer in 2015.

With 79 goals in six seasons he was the topscorer of Go Ahead Eagles.

== Career statistics ==
=== International ===
Appearances and goals by national team and year
National team	Year	Apps	Goals
Netherlands	1981	5	2
Netherlands	1982	3	2
Netherlands	1983	1	0
Total		9	4

Scores and results list the Netherlands' goal tally first, score column indicates score after each Van Kooten goal.

List of international goals scored by Cees van Kooten
No.	Date	Venue	Opponent	Score	Result	Competition
1	29 April 1981	Makario Stadium, Nicosia, Cyprus	Cyprus	1–0	1–0	1982 FIFA World Cup qualification
2	14 October 1981	De Kuip, Rotterdam, The Netherlands	Belgium	2–0	3–0	1982 FIFA World Cup qualification
3	19 December 1982	Old Tivoli, Aachen, Germany	Malta	2–0	6–0	UEFA Euro 1984 qualification
4	19 December 1982	Old Tivoli, Aachen, Germany	Malta	6–0	6–0	UEFA Euro 1984 qualification
