= Simon Tortell =

Maltese footballer (1959–2012)

Personal information
- Full name: Simon Tortell
- Date of birth: 8 August 1959
- Place of birth: Sliema, Malta
- Date of death: 15 June 2012 (aged 52)
- Position: Striker

Senior career*
Years	Team	Apps	(Gls)
1976–1984	Sliema Wanderers	66	(18)

International career^{‡}
1978–1983	Malta	5	(1)
- * Club domestic league appearances and goals as of 18 June 2012 ‡ National team caps and goals as of 18 June 2012

Simon Tortell (8 August 1959 – 15 June 2012) was a Maltese footballer. He was born in Sliema, Malta.

== Club career ==
Tortell was a striker who played for nine years with Sliema Wanderers, winning a league title and a FA Trophy medal with them. He scored in the 1979 FA Trophy Final against Floriana. He retired at age 24 to graduate from Malta University and become a lawyer.

== International career ==
Tortell made his debut for Malta in an October 1978 European Championship qualification match against Wales. He earned a total of 5 caps, scoring 1 goal.

His final international was the infamous December 1983 European Championship qualification defeat by Spain, which Malta lost 1-12, ensuring that Spain qualified for Euro 1984 ahead of the Netherlands on goal difference.

== Personal life ==
After retirement, Tortell became a successful lawyer and was partner at his own firm Simon Tortell & Associates. His father, Peter Tortell, also played for Sliema Wanderers in the 1950s. Simon Tortell died after a long illness on June 14, 2012, at age 52. He was married to Silvana Tortell and was father of three daughters.

== Honours ==
=== Floriana ===
- Maltese Premier League: 1

1976

- Maltese FA Trophy: 1

1979
