= Michael McMullan =

Irish football commentator

- Born: County Antrim, Northern Ireland
- Occupation: Sportscaster
- Known for: Presenting Premier League Live on Today FM, appearances on The Ray D'Arcy Show, disagreements with Ray D'Arcy

Michael McMullan is a sportscaster and radio presenter from County Antrim, Northern Ireland. He presented Premier League Live (formerly Premiership Live) each Saturday on national radio station Today FM. On each occasion he was joined in studio by BBC television analyst and former Republic of Ireland international footballer, Mark Lawrenson.

== Career ==
McMullan joined Premiership Live in 2001, six years before it underwent a name change to Premier League Live. He presented Today FM's coverage of the 2002 FIFA World Cup from Japan/South Korea.

McMullan also featured on The Ray D'Arcy Show on Today FM each Monday, where he discussed the previous weekend's sporting events.

In July 2007, he achieved the personal highlight of his reporting career, when he stood at the back of the 18th green at Carnoustie as the Irish golfer, Pádraig Harrington, holed the winning putt in The Open Championship.

In 2015, it was announced that McMullan had left Today FM.

== Personal life ==
Originally from County Antrim, McMullan has since moved to Dublin. His favourite sports are football, snooker and golf (he often has disagreements with D'Arcy over their differing opinions on the latter). He appeared on front of a newspaper with incoming Taoiseach, then Minister for Finance, Bertie Ahern in 1992, after winning a competition.
