= John Bonello (footballer) =

Maltese footballer

Personal information
- Date of birth: 10 May 1958 (age 68)
- Place of birth: Msida, Malta
- Position: Goalkeeper

Youth career
- -1972: Fgura United
- 1972-1974: Hibernians

Senior career*
Years	Team	Apps	(Gls)
1974–1980	Hibernians	62	(0)
1980–1981	SC Herford	6	(0)
1981–1993	Hibernians	151	(0)
1996–1999	Ħamrun Spartans	32	(0)
Total		251	(0)

International career
1979–1987	Malta	29	(0)
- * Club domestic league appearances and goals

John Bonello (born 10 May 1958) is a Maltese former footballer who played as a goalkeeper.

== Club career ==
Born in Msida, Bonello has played the majority of his career at Hibernians Paola, whom he joined from Fgura United. After being sidelined by Hibs for a few seasons he joined Ħamrun Spartans in 1996. He also had a season abroad at West German lower league side SC Herford. He was voted Malta Footballer of the Month in March 1986.

== International career ==
Bonello made his debut for Malta in an August 1979 friendly match against Tunisia. He earned a total of 29 caps, scoring no goals. He has represented his country in 7 FIFA World Cup qualification matches. Bonello was the goalkeeper in the infamous December 1983 European Championship qualification defeat by Spain, which Malta lost 1–12, ensuring that Spain qualified for Euro 1984 ahead of the Netherlands.

His final international was a January 1987 European Championship qualification match against Italy.

== Personal life ==
His son Henry is an international goalkeeper as well.
