= Antonio Maceda =

Spanish footballer

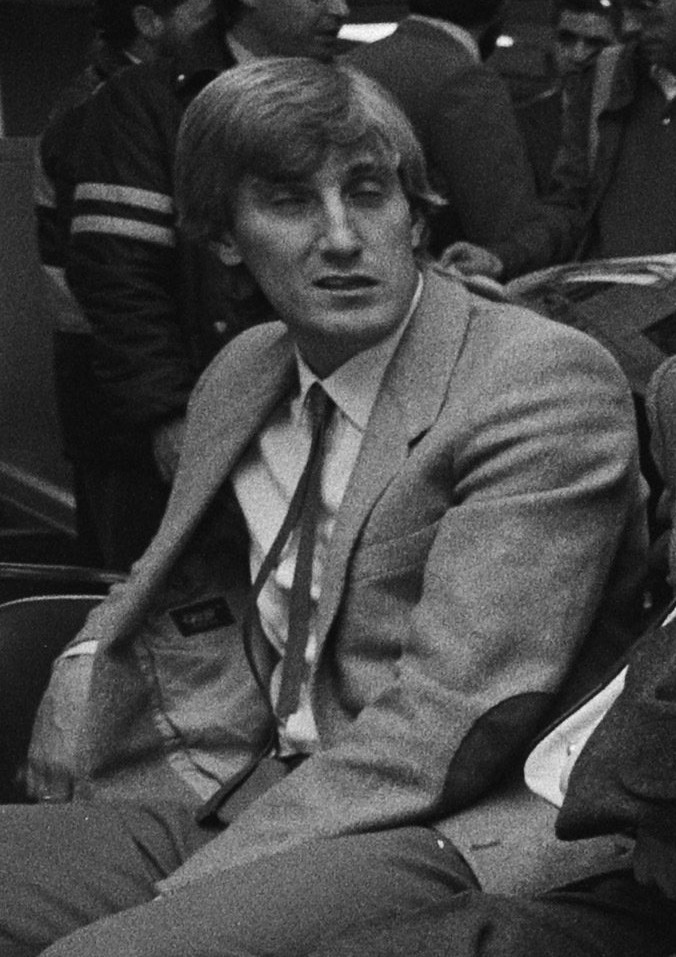
- Maceda in 1983

Personal information
- Full name: Antonio Maceda Francés
- Date of birth: 16 May 1957 (age 69)
- Place of birth: Sagunto, Spain
- Height: 1.89 m (6 ft 2 in)
- Position: Centre-back

Youth career
- 1972–1974: Acero

Senior career*
Years	Team	Apps	(Gls)
1974–1976	Sporting Gijón B		
1976–1985	Sporting Gijón	212	(20)
1985–1988	Real Madrid	30	(5)

International career
1977	Spain U21	1	(0)
1982	Spain U23	1	(0)
1980–1981	Spain B	3	(0)
1981–1986	Spain	36	(8)

Managerial career
- 1993–1994: Castellón (youth)
- 1996–1997: Badajoz
- 1997: Sporting Gijón B
- 1997: Sporting Gijón
- 1998: Compostela
- 2002–2003: Sporting Gijón
- * Club domestic league appearances and goals

Antonio Maceda Francés (born 16 May 1957) is a Spanish former professional footballer. Though a central defender, he was known for his scoring ability.

He started his career at Sporting de Gijón and finished it with Real Madrid, where he was greatly hampered by injuries.

Maceda played 36 times with Spain, and represented the nation at two World Cups and Euro 1984.

== Club career ==
Maceda was born in Sagunto, Province of Valencia, and played for Sporting de Gijón and Real Madrid during his career. In his third professional year, he contributed 11 matches to the Asturians final runner-up position in La Liga, and became a defensive stalwart subsequently.

In summer 1985, after scoring nine league goals over his last two seasons, Maceda earned himself a transfer to giants Real Madrid, and netted five times in his debut campaign, claiming a double of league and UEFA Cup. However, following a freak injury with the national side, he was forced to retire in 1988 at only 31, amassing Spanish top-flight totals of 223 games and 24 goals.

Maceda worked as a radio commentator afterwards, then took up coaching, most notably with his first club, being one of four managers in 1997–98 as Sporting finished last with an all-time low 13 points; he was also in charge of the main squad for the vast majority of the 2002–03 season, in the Segunda División.

== International career ==
Maceda earned 36 caps and scored eight goals for the Spain national team, taking part in three major tournaments: the 1982 FIFA World Cup, UEFA Euro 1984 (during the qualifying stages, he netted twice in the decisive and historic 12–1 rout of Malta) and the 1986 World Cup.

In Euro 84, played in France, Maceda headed a winner in the 89th minute against a then-invincible West Germany side who were also the defending European champions, sending the country to the semi-finals against an up-and-coming Denmark – where he also scored – in an eventual penalty shootout victory. He missed the 2–0 final loss to France due to suspension.

Maceda retired from the international scene after the 1986 World Cup, due to a serious injury. He had made his debut on 25 March 1981 in a friendly 2–1 win over England, the first time Spain achieved this at Wembley Stadium.

=== International goals ===
#	Date	Venue	Opponent	Score	Result	Competition
1.	17 November 1982	Lansdowne Road, Dublin, Ireland	Republic of Ireland	1–1	3–3	Euro 1984 qualifying
2.	29 May 1983	Laugardalsvöllur, Reykjavík, Iceland	Iceland	0–1	0–1	Euro 1984 qualifying
3.	21 December 1983	Benito Villamarín Stadium, Seville, Spain	Malta	6–1	12–1	Euro 1984 qualifying
4.	21 December 1983	Benito Villamarín Stadium, Seville, Spain	Malta	7–1	12–1	Euro 1984 qualifying
5.	29 February 1984	Stade National, Luxembourg, Luxembourg	Luxembourg	0–1	0–1	Friendly
6.	20 June 1984	Parc des Princes, Paris, France	West Germany	0–1	0–1	UEFA Euro 1984
7.	24 June 1984	Stade de Gerland, Lyon, France	Denmark	1–1	1–1	UEFA Euro 1984
8.	19 February 1986	Estadio Martínez Valero, Elche, Spain	Belgium	3–0	3–0	Friendly

== Honours ==
Real Madrid

- La Liga: 1985–86, 1987–88
- UEFA Cup: 1985–86

Spain

- UEFA European Championship runner-up: 1984
