= Wales national football team manager =

Welsh role

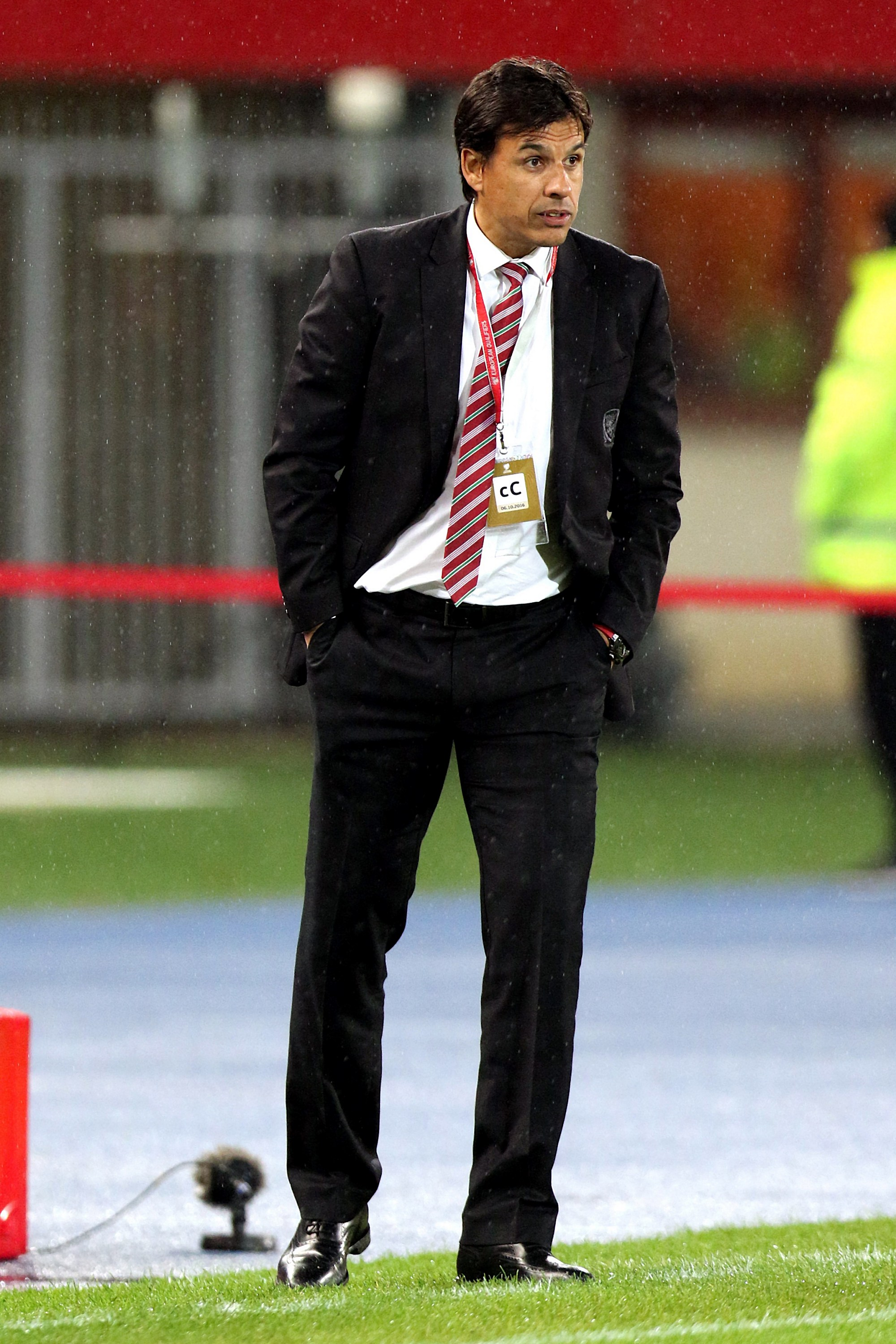
Chris Coleman was the manager of Wales from 2012 to 2017. He led the team to the UEFA Euro 2016 semi-finals.

The role of a Wales national football team manager was first established in 1876, when the Wales national football team was established, and the team was chosen by a panel of selectors. The team captain would at that point fulfil the role of match day coach. Since 1954 a manager has been appointed by the Football Association of Wales.

Sixteen men have occupied the post since its inception; four more acted in short-term caretaker manager roles: Brian Flynn (two games in charge), Trevor Morris (one game), David Williams (one game), and Neville Southall (one game), alongside Mark Hughes.

The longest serving manager is Dave Bowen, who was manager for ten years before leaving in 1974. Bowen was in charge of the team for fifty-three games, winning ten. However, his win percentage of 20% is the lowest of all Wales managers. The most successful manager in terms of wins was John Toshack. Wales has never had a non-British manager but Mike Smith became the first English manager to lead Wales in 1974.

Jimmy Murphy, Chris Coleman and Rob Page are the only managers to have taken the team to any FIFA World Cup or UEFA European Championship finals. Murphy led his team to the 1958 FIFA World Cup quarter-finals, where they were knocked out by Brazil. Coleman led his team to the UEFA Euro 2016 semi-finals, where they were knocked out by eventual winners Portugal. Under Coleman, Wales peaked at eighth in the FIFA world rankings.

== Position ==
=== Role ===
The Wales manager's role means he has sole responsibility for all on-the-field elements of the Wales team. Among other activities, this includes selecting the national team, starting lineup, captain, tactics, substitutes, and penalty-takers. Before 1954 a "panel of selectors" would manage all issues barring the actual match day team selection, formation, and tactics, which was left to the head coach for the event.

The manager is given a free hand in selecting his coaching ("back room") staff. The Wales manager may also involve himself in wider issues beyond the on-the-field team issues. On a more tactical level, a host of other details can be influenced. For example, former manager Ryan Giggs was given the choice by the FAW Chief Executive of whether to play fixtures at the team's current ground (the Cardiff City Stadium) or its previous venue (the Millennium Stadium).

The national team manager is tasked with the role of continuing the club like relationship between players and fans, first brought in by Gary Speed.It is now part of the “Welsh Way”, which former assistant manager, Osian Roberts brought in via the FAW Coaching Program. It is taught to numerous of former players or aspiring coaches sitting their coaching badges with the FAW.

=== Appointment ===
The current process of appointing a new Wales manager is through an FAW panel, consisting of the CEO and six members of the board.

== List of managers ==
- Caretaker manager is indicated with a (c).
- **BOLD** names indicates that the manager has taken the team to a FIFA World Cup or UEFA European Championship finals.

As of 17 November 2026

| Image | Nationality | Name | Player caps | Start year | End year | First game | Final game | Pld | Wins | Draws | Loss | Goals for | Goals against | Win % |
|---|---|---|---|---|---|---|---|---|---|---|---|---|---|---|
| | Wales | Walley Barnes | 22 | 1954 | 1956 | 9 May 1954 vs Austria | 11 Apr 1956 vs Northern Ireland | 9 | 2 | 1 | 6 | 10 | 17 | 22 |
| | Wales | **Jimmy Murphy** | 15 | 1956 | 1964 | 20 Oct 1956 vs Scotland | 20 Nov 1963 vs Scotland | 43 | 11 | 13 | 19 | 59 | 79 | 26 |
| | Wales | Trevor Morris (c) | 0 | 1964 | 1964 | 15 Apr 1964 vs Northern Ireland | | 1 | 0 | 0 | 1 | 2 | 3 | 0 |
| | Wales | Dave Bowen | 19 | 1964 | 1974 | 3 Oct 1964 vs Scotland | 18 May 1974 vs Northern Ireland | 53 | 10 | 13 | **30** | 49 | **84** | 20 |
| | England | Mike Smith | N/A | 1974 | 1979 | 4 Sep 1974 vs Austria | 21 Nov 1979 vs Turkey | 40 | 15 | 11 | 14 | 49 | 39 | 38 |
| | Wales | Mike England | 44 | 1980 | 1987 | 17 Mar 1980 vs England | 11 Nov 1987 vs Czechoslovakia | **56** | 21 | **18** | 17 | **68** | 52 | 38 |
| | Wales | David Williams (c) | 5 | 1988 | 1988 | 23 Mar 1988 vs Yugoslavia | | 1 | 0 | 0 | 1 | 1 | 2 | 0 |
| | Wales | Terry Yorath | 59 | 1988 | 1993 | 27 Apr 1988 vs Sweden | 17 Nov 1993 vs Romania | 41 | 16 | 8 | 17 | 48 | 54 | 39 |
| | Wales | John Toshack | 40 | 1994 | 1994 | 9 Mar 1994 vs Norway | | 1 | 0 | 0 | 1 | 1 | 3 | 0 |
| | England | Mike Smith | N/A | 1994 | 1995 | 20 Apr 1994 vs Sweden | 6 Sep 1995 vs Moldova | 10 | 3 | 1 | 6 | 9 | 19 | 30 |
| | England | Bobby Gould | N/A | 1995 | 1999 | 11 Oct 1995 vs Germany | 5 June 1999 vs Italy | 24 | 7 | 4 | 13 | 32 | 47 | 29 |
| | Wales Wales | Mark Hughes & Neville Southall (c) | 72 92 | 1999 | 1999 | 9 June 1999 vs Denmark | | 1 | 0 | 0 | 1 | 1 | 2 | 0 |
| | Wales | Mark Hughes | 72 | 1999 | 2004 | 4 Sep 1999 vs Belarus | 13 Oct 2004 vs Poland | 41 | 11 | 15 | 15 | 46 | 49 | 27 |
| | Wales | John Toshack | 40 | 2005 | 2010 | 9 Feb 2005 vs Hungary | 3 Sep 2010 vs Montenegro | 53 | **22** | 8 | 23 | 61 | 56 | 42 |
| | Wales | Brian Flynn (c) | 66 | 2010 | 2010 | 8 Oct 2010 vs Bulgaria | 12 Oct 2010 vs Switzerland | 2 | 0 | 0 | 2 | 1 | 5 | 0 |
| | Wales | Gary Speed | 85 | 2010 | 2011 | 8 Feb 2011 v Republic of Ireland | 12 Nov 2011 v Norway | 10 | 5 | 0 | 5 | 13 | 13 | 50 |
| | Wales | **Chris Coleman** | 32 | 2012 | 2017 | 29 Feb 2012 v Costa Rica | 14 Nov 2017 v Panama | 49 | 19 | 13 | 17 | 52 | 56 | 39 |
| | Wales | Ryan Giggs | 64 | 2018 | 2022 | 22 Mar 2018 v China | 14 Oct 2020 v Bulgaria | 24 | 12 | 4 | 8 | 26 | 20 | 50 |
| | Wales | **Rob Page** | 41 | 2020 | 2024 | 12 Nov 2020 v United States | 9 Jun 2024 v Slovakia | 45 | 15 | 16 | 14 | 51 | 53 | 33 |
| | Wales | Craig Bellamy | 78 | 2024 | | 6 September 2024 v Turkey | | 26 | 9 | 7 | 10 | 38 | 35 | 35 |

=== Managers at the World Cup/European Championship finals ===
| Final | Manager | Pld | Win(s) | Draw(s) | Loss(s) | Goals for | Goals against | Position |
|---|---|---|---|---|---|---|---|---|
| 1958 Sweden | Jimmy Murphy | 5 | 1 | 3 | 1 | 4 | 4 | Quarter-finals |
| 2016 France | Chris Coleman | 6 | 4 | 0 | 2 | 10 | 6 | Semi-finals |
| 2020 Europe | Rob Page | 4 | 1 | 1 | 2 | 3 | 6 | Round of 16 |
| 2022 Qatar | Rob Page | 3 | 0 | 1 | 2 | 1 | 6 | Group stage |

Draws also include penalties.
