= Juan Señor =

Spanish footballer

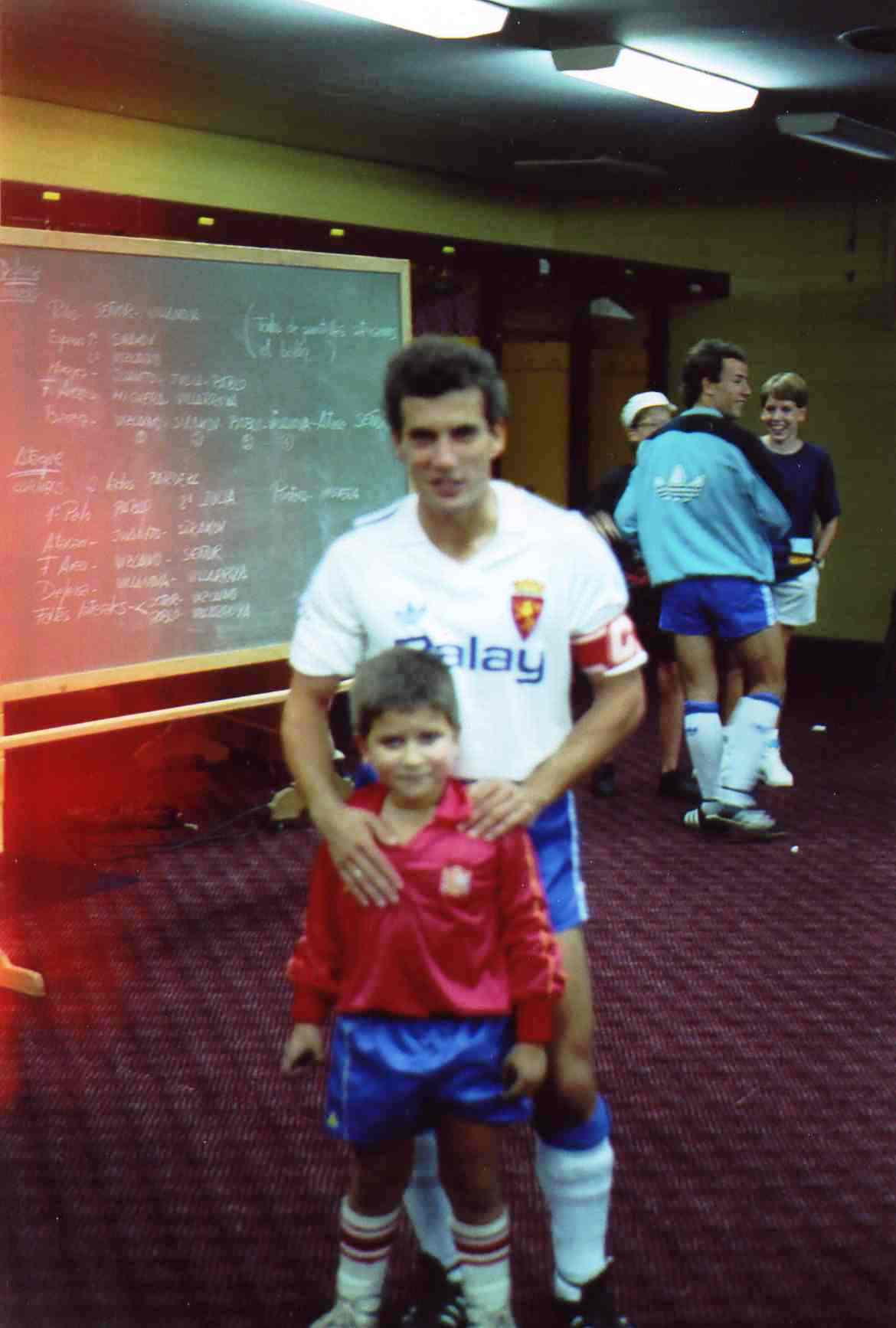

Personal information
- Full name: Juan Antonio Señor Gómez
- Date of birth: 26 August 1958 (age 68)
- Place of birth: Madrid, Spain
- Height: 1.67 m (5 ft 5 1/2 in)
- Position: Midfielder

Youth career
- 1974–1977: Real Madrid

Senior career*
Years	Team	Apps	(Gls)
1977–1978	Ciempozuelos		
1978–1981	Alavés	80	(17)
1981–1990	Zaragoza	304	(54)
Total		384	(71)

International career
1981	Spain B	1	(0)
1983	Spain amateur	2	(0)
1982–1988	Spain	41	(6)

Managerial career
- 1999–2000: Mérida
- 2000–2001: Salamanca
- 2002: Cartagena
- 2003: Logroñés
- 2023: Pontevedra
Medal record
Representing Spain
UEFA European Championship
Runner-up	1984 France
- * Club domestic league appearances and goals

Juan Antonio Señor Gómez (born 26 August 1958) is a Spanish former professional footballer who played as a central midfielder.

He played mainly for Zaragoza during his 13-year senior career, making nearly 375 official appearances in nine seasons. After retiring, he worked as a manager.

The scorer of one of Spain's most important goals, Señor earned 41 caps in the 1980s, representing the nation in one World Cup and one European Championship.

== Club career ==
Señor was born in Madrid. During his career, the Real Madrid youth graduate represented CD Ciempozuelos (Tercera División), Deportivo Alavés (Segunda División) and Real Zaragoza as a professional. He played 369 competitive games with the Aragonese club, scoring 70 goals.

In the 1986–87 season, which featured a second stage, Señor netted 11 times in 43 matches as Zaragoza finished fifth. He also helped the side to win the Copa del Rey in 1986, being voted by magazine Don Balón the league's best player in the 1982–83 campaign where he recorded 33 appearances and five goals.

Señor had to retire sooner than expected due to a heart disease, his last season being 1989–90. He subsequently moved into coaching, going on to work with CP Mérida, UD Salamanca, FC Cartagena and CD Logroñés, and also began running a football campus for children in the Aragonese Pyrenees.

On 27 February 2023, 20 years after he last managed, Señor was appointed at Primera Federación club Pontevedra CF. He was unable to prevent relegation, as second-bottom.

== International career ==
Señor made 41 appearances for Spain, his debut coming on 27 October 1982 in a UEFA Euro 1984 qualifier against Iceland, a 1–0 win in Málaga. Also during that stage, he scored the most important of his six international goals: on 23 December 1983, as the national team needed to win by 11 goals against Malta to qualify, he scored in the 85th in a final 12–1 result in Seville.

Señor was part of the nation's squads at Euro 1984 and the 1986 FIFA World Cup, where he scored another late goal, in a quarter-final penalty shootout loss to Belgium (1–1 after 120 minutes).

=== International goals ===
No.	Date	Venue	Opponent	Score	Result	Competition
1.	16 February 1983	Sánchez Pizjuán, Seville, Spain	Netherlands	1–0	1–0	UEFA Euro 1984 qualifying
2.	15 May 1983	Ta' Qali, Attard, Malta	Malta	0–1	2–3	UEFA Euro 1984 qualifying
3.	5 October 1983	Parc des Princes, Paris, France	France	1–1	1–1	Friendly
4.	21 December 1983	Benito Villamarín, Seville, Spain	Malta	12–1	12–1	UEFA Euro 1984 qualifying
5.	11 April 1984	Luis Casanova, Valencia, Spain	Denmark	2–1	2–1	Friendly
6.	22 June 1986	Cuauhtémoc, Puebla, Mexico	Belgium	1–1	1–1	1986 FIFA World Cup

== Honours ==
Zaragoza

- Copa del Rey: 1985–86

Spain

- UEFA European Championship runner-up: 1984
