= Ernest Spiteri-Gonzi =

Maltese footballer

Personal information
- Date of birth: 21 October 1955 (age 71)
- Place of birth: Aldershot, England
- Height: 1.80 m (5 ft 11 in)
- Position: Striker

Senior career*
| Years | Team | Apps | (Gls) |
| 1972–1985 | Hibernians | 186 | (71) |

International career^{‡}
| 1978–1983 | Malta | 20 | (3) |
- * Club domestic league appearances and goals as of 5 October 2009 ‡ National team caps and goals as of 5 October 2009

Ernest Spiteri-Gonzi (born 21 October 1955) is a retired footballer who played as a striker. Born in England, he played for the Malta national team.

== Club career ==
During his club career, Spiteri-Gonzi played for Hibernians. He twice became Maltese top goalscorer, in the 1980–81 and 1981–82 seasons. He was also voted Maltese Player of the Year in the 1981–82 season.

== International career ==
Spiteri-Gonzi has played for Malta and has earned a total of 20 caps, scoring 3 goals. He has represented his country in 4 FIFA World Cup qualification matches. On 18 March 1979, in a match against Turkey, he scored the first Maltese international goal in 17 years. Spiteri-Gonzi also played in the infamous December 1983 European Championship qualification defeat by Spain, which Malta lost 1–12, ensuring that Spain qualified for Euro 1984 ahead of the Netherlands on goal difference. He later accused Spain of being "cheats".
