= Emanuel Fabri =

Maltese footballer

Personal information
- Full name: Emanuel "Leli" Fabri
- Date of birth: 16 December 1952 (age 73)
- Place of birth: Qormi, Malta
- Position: Midfielder

Senior career*
Years	Team	Apps	(Gls)
1967–1968	Luqa St. Andrew's		
1968–1974	Qormi	90	(18)
1974–1990	Sliema Wanderers		
1986–1987	→ Qormi (loan)	9	(1)

International career^{‡}
1973–1983	Malta	28	(3)
- * Club domestic league appearances and goals as of 20 February 2010 ‡ National team caps and goals as of 20 February 2010

Emanuel "Leli" Fabri (born 16 December 1952) is a Maltese former football midfielder.

== Playing career ==
During his club career, Fabri played for Luqa St. Andrew's, Qormi and Sliema Wanderers. He also played for the Malta national football team, scoring 3 times.

== Career statistics ==
=== International goals ===
#	Date	Venue	Opponent	Score	Result	Competition
1.	4 April 1981	Empire Stadium, Gżira, Malta	East Germany	1–2	Lose	1982 World Cup qualification
2.	5 June 1982	Stadio Comunale Giovanni Celeste, Messina, Italy	Iceland	2–1	Win	Euro 1984 Q.
3.	1 February 1983	Marsa Stadium, Marsa, Malta	Tunisia	1–2	Lose	Friendly
Correct as of 7 June 2013
