= Hugo Hovenkamp =

Dutch footballer

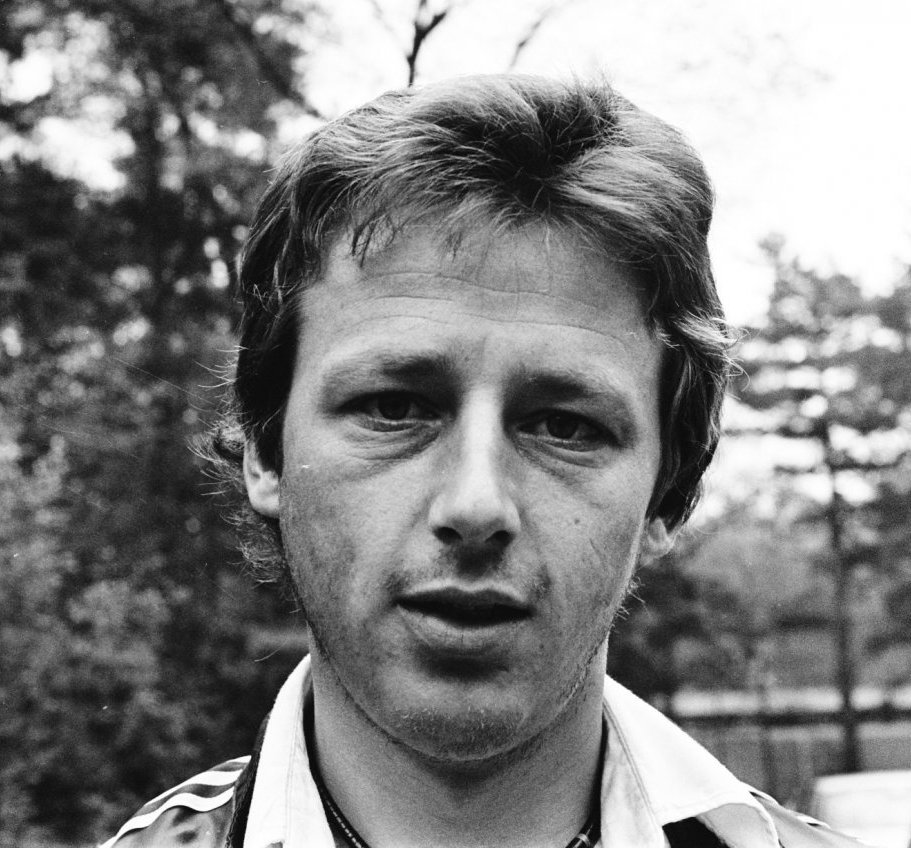

Personal information
- Full name: Hugo Hermanus Hovenkamp
- Date of birth: 5 October 1950 (age 76)
- Place of birth: Groningen, Netherlands
- Position: Leftback

Youth career
- GVAV

Senior career*
Years	Team	Apps	(Gls)
1968–1971	GVAV	46	(1)
1971–1975	FC Groningen	125	(13)
1975–1983	AZ '67	241	(16)
1983–1985	Wacker Innsbruck	53	(7)
Total		465	(37)

International career
1977–1983	Netherlands	31	(2)
Medal record
Representing Netherlands
FIFA World Cup
Runner-up	1978 Argentina
- * Club domestic league appearances and goals

Hugo Hermanus Hovenkamp (born 5 October 1950) is a Dutch former professional footballer, who played as a left-back. Most notably, he played for Eredivisie club AZ '67 in the late 1970s and early 1980s, where he won the 1980–81 championship, as well as three KNVB Cups.

He was born close to the Stadion Oosterpark in Groningen and started playing football for GVAV, where he learned the trade from Dutch international player Piet Fransen.

Hovenkamp made his international debut for Netherlands in a 2-0 win in February 1977 against England. Hovenkamp was forced to withdraw from the 1978 FIFA World Cup squad due to injury, but as the deadline for calling up replacement players had passed, the Netherlands were unable to replace him.

He did play in the 1980 European Championships, and played his final international (a 1–0 loss to Spain) in a qualifier for the 1984 European Championship. He obtained 31 caps, scoring 2 goals.

== Career statistics ==
=== International ===
Appearances and goals by national team and year
National team	Year	Apps	Goals
Netherlands	1977	6	0
Netherlands	1978	4	0
Netherlands	1979	6	0
Netherlands	1980	7	0
Netherlands	1981	5	1
Netherlands	1982	2	1
Netherlands	1983	1	0
Total		31	2

Scores and results list the Netherlands' goal tally first, score column indicates score after each Hovenkamp goal.

List of international goals scored by Hugo Hovenkamp
No.	Date	Venue	Opponent	Score	Result	Competition
1	22 February 1981	Stadion Oosterpark, Groningen, Netherlands	Cyprus	1–0	3–0	1982 FIFA World Cup qualification
2	19 December 1982	Tivoli Stadium, Aachen, Germany	Malta	3–0	6–0	UEFA Euro 1984 qualification

== Honours ==
AZ '67

- Eredivisie: 1980–81
- KNVB Cup: 1977–78, 1980–81, 1981–82
- UEFA Cup: runner-up 1980-81
