= Hipólito Rincón =

Spanish footballer

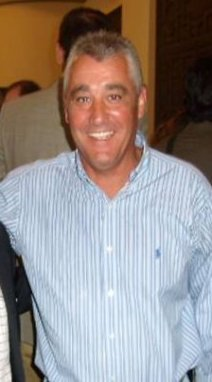
- Rincón in 2010

Personal information
- Full name: Hipólito Rincón Povedano
- Date of birth: 28 April 1957 (age 69)
- Place of birth: Lavapiés, Spain
- Height: 1.77 m (5 ft 10 in)
- Position: Striker

Youth career
- 1965–1976: Real Madrid

Senior career*
Years	Team	Apps	(Gls)
1976–1981	Real Madrid	16	(3)
1976–1977	→ Díter Zafra (loan)		
1977–1978	→ Recreativo (loan)	33	(12)
1978–1979	→ Valladolid (loan)	14	(5)
1981–1989	Betis	223	(78)
Total		286	(98)

International career
1980	Spain U23	2	(0)
1979–1983	Spain amateur	8	(1)
1983–1986	Spain	22	(10)
- * Club domestic league appearances and goals

Hipólito "Poli" Rincón Povedano (born 28 April 1957) is a Spanish former professional footballer who played as a striker.

He played mainly for Real Madrid and Real Betis in a 13-year career, amassing La Liga totals of 239 games and 81 goals.

Having won 22 caps for Spain, Rincón appeared with the national team at the 1986 World Cup.

== Club career ==
Rincón was born in Lavapiés, Madrid. A Real Madrid youth graduate, he served three loan stints during his tenure, one in the lower leagues with CD Díter Zafra, eventually making his debut for the former's first team on 14 October 1979 in a 3–2 home win against Real Zaragoza and scoring twice as a second-half substitute; he could never impose himself in the capital side's main squad, however, totalling only 16 La Liga games from 1979 to 1981.

Rincón joined Andalusia's Real Betis for the 1981–82 season, netting 20 league goals in his second year which earned him the Pichichi Trophy, even though his team could only rank 11th. He went on to score 93 times in all competitions for the club, and retired at the end of the 1988–89 campaign aged 32 after suffering top-flight relegation.

In 2004, Rincón served briefly as Betis neighbours Xerez CD's director of football. He also worked as a sports commentator for Cadena SER and Cadena COPE.

== International career ==
Rincón played 22 times and scored ten goals for the Spain national team over three years. His debut came on 27 April 1983 in a UEFA Euro 1984 qualifier against the Republic of Ireland, in Zaragoza; in only 15 minutes of play, after replacing FC Barcelona's Francisco Carrasco, he scored the final 2–0.

On 21 December 1983, in his sixth international, Rincón netted four times in Spain's historic 12–1 victory over Malta, in a Euro 1984 qualifying match played in Seville. He would not be however picked for the finals in France, being selected two years later for the 1986 FIFA World Cup squad but making no appearances in Mexico.

== Career statistics ==
=== International ===
International goals scored by Hipólito Rincón

#	Date	Venue	Opponent	Score	Result	Competition
1.	27 April 1983	La Romareda, Zaragoza, Spain	Republic of Ireland	2–0	2–0	Euro 1984 qualifying
2.	21 December 1983	Benito Villamarín, Seville, Spain	Malta	4–1	12–1	Euro 1984 qualifying
3.	21 December 1983	Benito Villamarín, Seville, Spain	Malta	5–1	12–1	Euro 1984 qualifying
4.	21 December 1983	Benito Villamarín, Seville, Spain	Malta	8–1	12–1	Euro 1984 qualifying
5.	21 December 1983	Benito Villamarín, Seville, Spain	Malta	10–1	12–1	Euro 1984 qualifying
6.	26 May 1984	Charmilles, Geneva, Switzerland	Switzerland	0–3	0–4	Friendly
7.	31 May 1984	Üllői úti, Budapest, Hungary	Hungary	0–1	1–1	Friendly
8.	17 October 1984	Benito Villamarín, Seville, Spain	Wales	1–0	3–0	1986 World Cup qualification
9.	23 January 1985	Rico Pérez, Alicante, Spain	Finland	1–0	3–1	Friendly
10.	25 September 1985	Benito Villamarín, Seville, Spain	Iceland	1–1	2–1	1986 World Cup qualification

== Honours ==
Real Madrid

- La Liga: 1979–80
- Copa del Rey: 1979–80

Individual

- Pichichi Trophy: 1982–83
