= Cees Schapendonk =

Dutch footballer (born 1955)

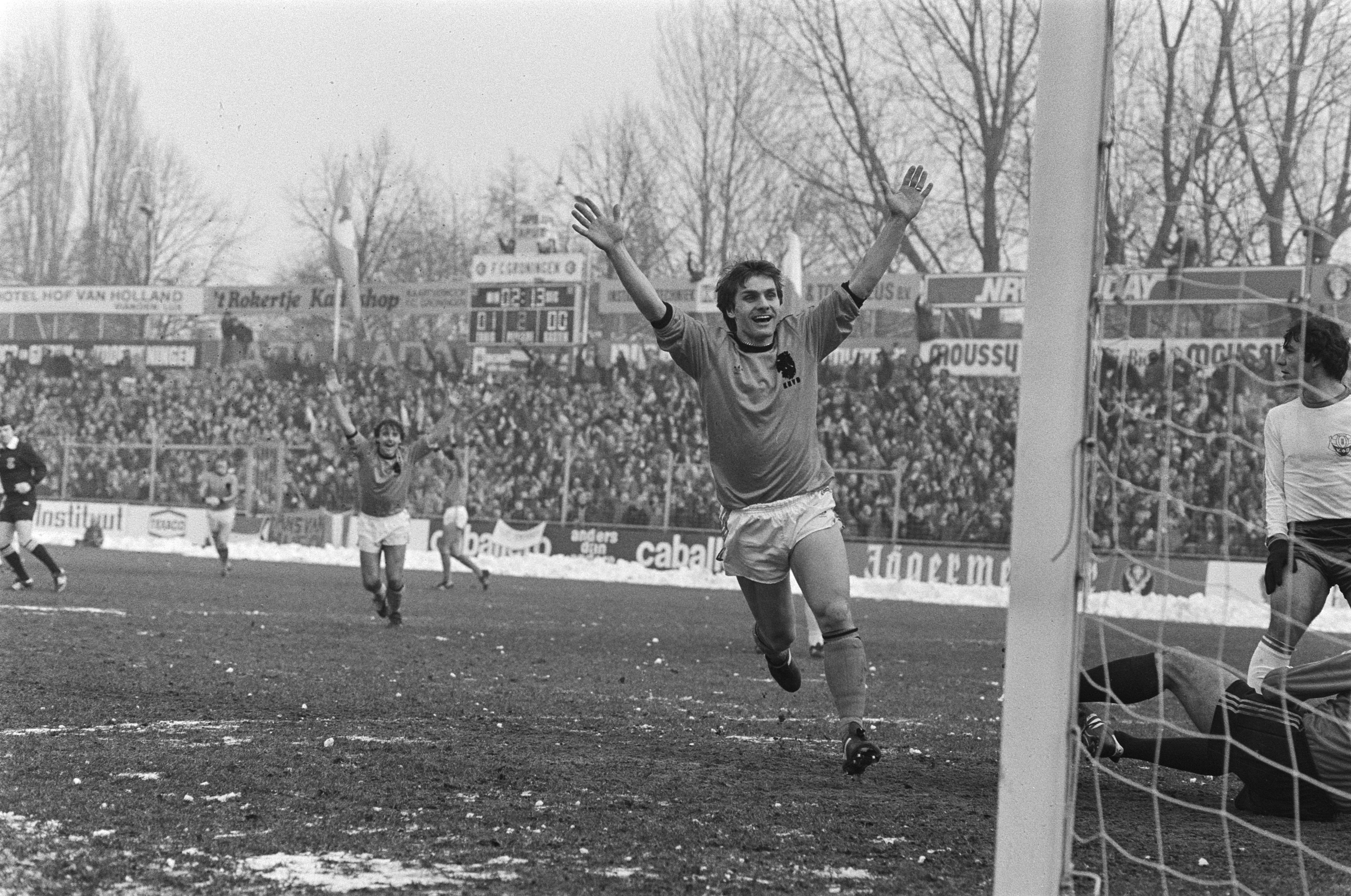
- Schapendonk with the Netherlands in 1981

Personal information
- Full name: Cornelis Schapendonk
- Date of birth: 24 December 1955 (age 70)
- Place of birth: 's-Hertogenbosch, Netherlands
- Position: Forward

Youth career
- Concordia SVD

Senior career*
| Years | Team | Apps | (Gls) |
| 1975–1979 | Eindhoven | 106 | (50) |
| 1979–1982 | MVV | 91 | (52) |
| 1982–1987 | Gent | 117 | (22) |
| 1986–1987 | → Excelsior (loan) | 32 | (17) |
| 1987–1990 | RKC | 71 | (38) |
| 1990–1993 | NAC Breda | 72 | (9) |
| Total | | 489 | (188) |

International career
| 1981 | Netherlands | 1 | (1) |
- * Club domestic league appearances and goals

Cornelis "Cees" Schapendonk (born 24 December 1955) is a Dutch former professional footballer who played as a forward. He spent his career with Eindhoven, MVV, Gent, Excelsior, RKC and NAC Breda, and won the Belgian Cup with Gent in 1984. Schapendonk scored on his only appearance for the Netherlands national team in 1981.

== Club career ==
Schapendonk began his professional career with Eindhoven in 1975 and was the Eerste Divisie's top scorer in the 1978–79 season with 24 goals. He subsequently moved to MVV in 1979, where he scored 52 league goals across three seasons.

In 1982, Schapendonk moved to Gent in Belgium, spending four seasons with the club. He scored the opening goal in the 93rd minute of the 1984 Belgian Cup final against Standard Liège, a match Gent won 2–0 after extra time.

He returned to the Netherlands with a loan to Excelsior in 1986–87, before joining RKC Waalwijk in October 1987. With RKC he achieved promotion to the Eredivisie in 1988, and later finished his professional career with NAC Breda in 1993.

== International career ==
Schapendonk earned his only cap for the Netherlands on 22 February 1981, starting and scoring in a 3–0 1982 FIFA World Cup qualification (UEFA) win over Cyprus in Groningen. In a 2025 interview he reflected on that night and on never receiving another call-up thereafter.

== After football ==
After retiring, Schapendonk worked in scouting and analysis. He is listed by RKC Waalwijk among the club's scouting staff.

In later life, Schapendonk faced serious health problems, including strokes, heart attacks and a torn aorta, which he discussed in a 2025 interview with Algemeen Dagblad.

== Career statistics ==
=== International ===
Netherlands score listed first, score column indicates score after Schapendonk goal.

List of international goals scored by Ramiz Zerrouki
| No. | Date | Venue | Cap | Opponent | Score | Result | Competition | Ref. |
|---|---|---|---|---|---|---|---|---|
| 1 | 22 February 1981 | Stadion Oosterpark, Groningen, Netherlands | 1 | Cyprus | 3–0 | 2–0 | 1982 FIFA World Cup qualification | |

== Honours ==
Gent

- Belgian Cup: 1983–84

Individual

- Eerste Divisie top scorer: 1978–79 (24 goals)
