= Albert Cluytens =

Belgian footballer

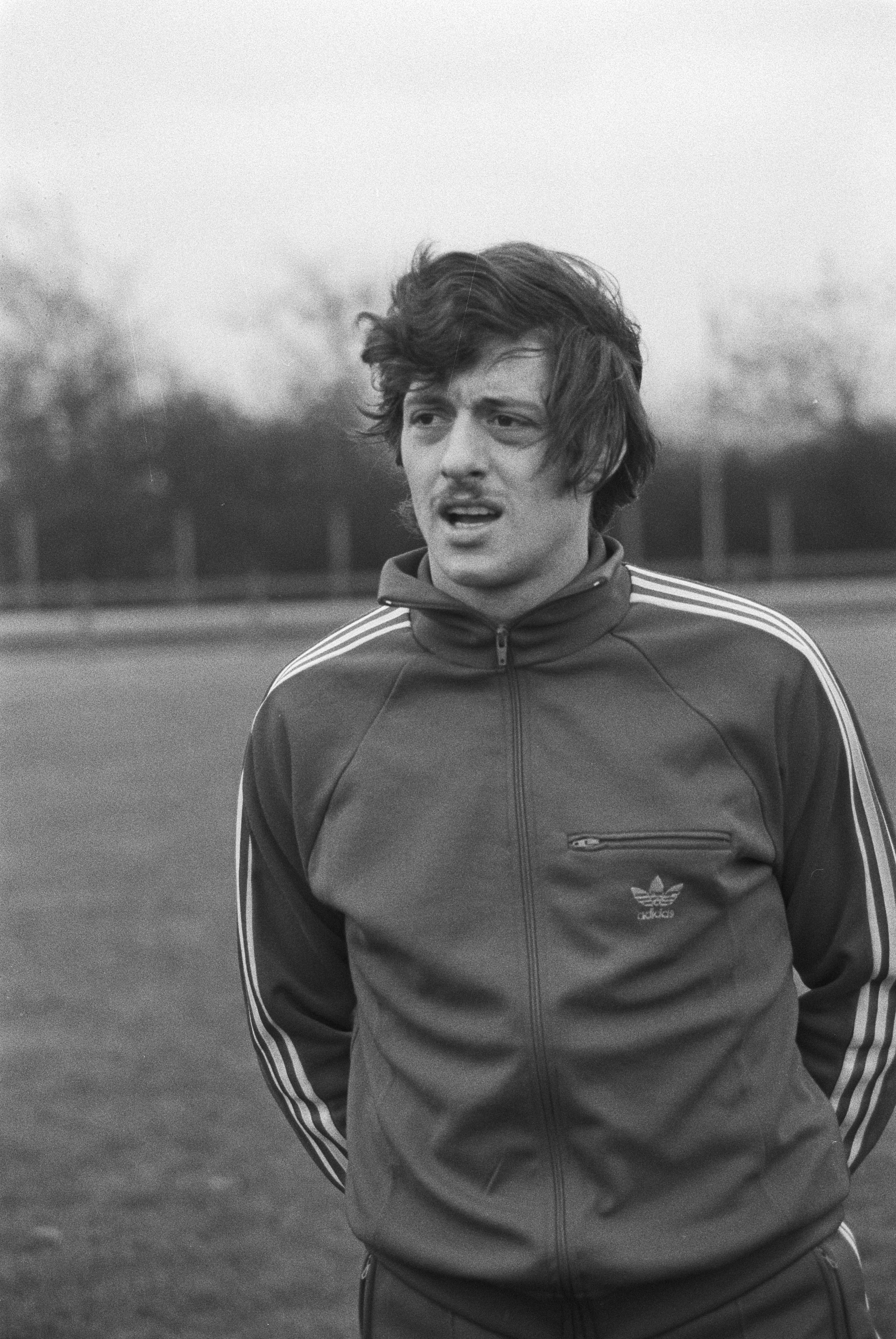
- Albert Cluytens in 1980

Personal information
- Date of birth: 16 November 1955 (age 70)
- Place of birth: Antwerp, Belgium
- Position: Midfielder

International career
Years	Team	Apps	(Gls)
1977–1981	Belgium	11	(1)

Albert Cluytens (born 16 November 1955) is a Belgian footballer. He played in eleven matches for the Belgium national football team from 1977 to 1981.

Cluytens played for the following teams:

- 1974-1981 KSK Beveren
- 1981-1982 RSC Anderlecht
- 1982-1983 Royal Antwerp FC
- 1983-1988 FC Malines
- 1988-1989 RWD Molenbeek
- 1989-1990 Royal Francs Borains
- 1990-1991 KRC Boortmeerbeek
- 1991-1992 KFC Eendracht Zele
- 1992-1995 Sint-Martens-Latem
- 1997-1999 KSK Kallo
