= Stadion Oosterpark =

Football stadium

Oosterpark Stadion
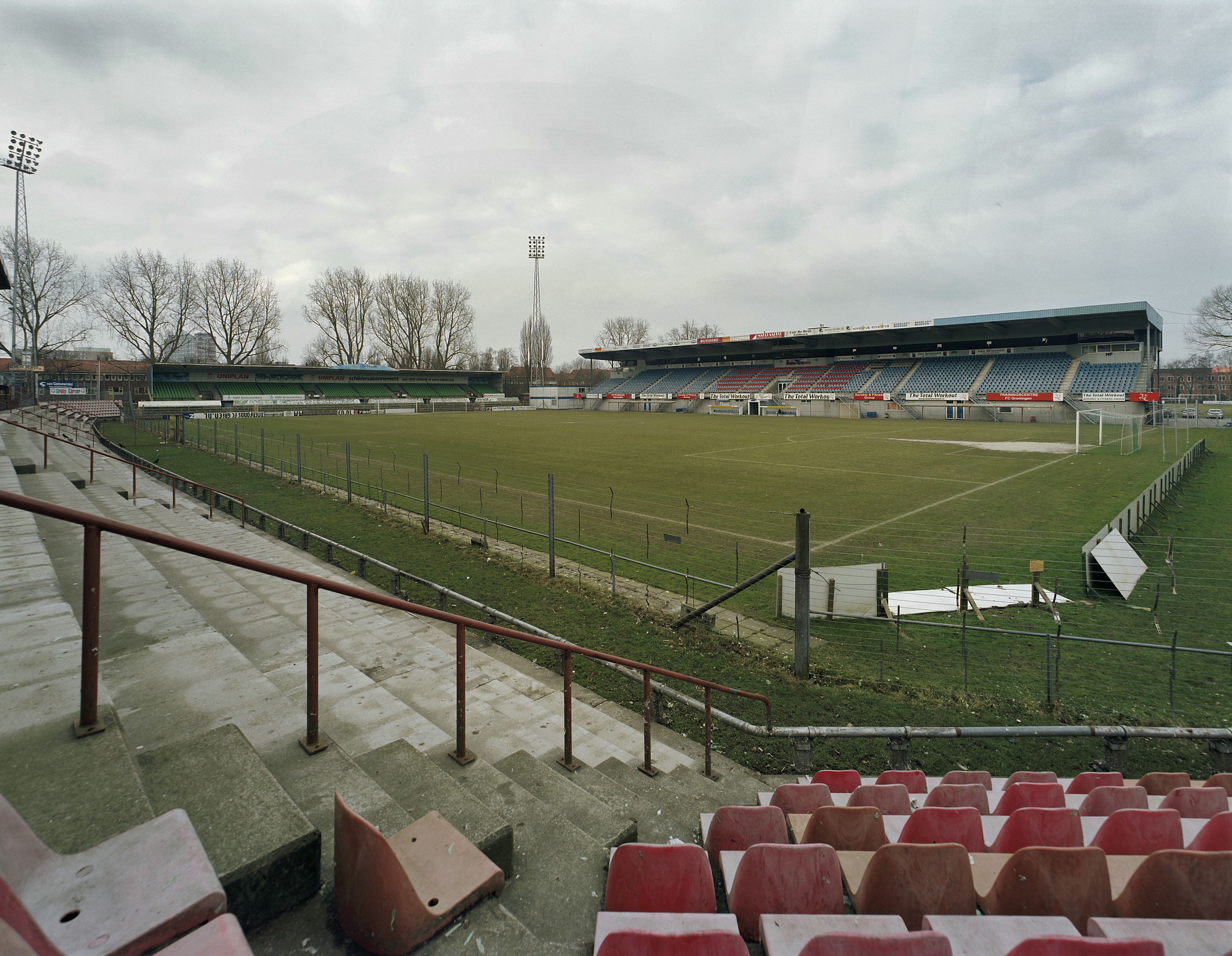
- Stadium in 2006

- Location in the province of Groningen in the Netherlands
- Location: Groningen, Netherlands
- Coordinates: 53°13′37″N 6°34′49″E
- Capacity: 22,000 (1985); 11,224 (2006)

Construction
- Opened: 30 September 1933
- Renovated: 1960, 1984, 1987–88
- Closed: 2005
- Demolished: 2006–7

Tenant
- FC Groningen

Website
- www.stadionoosterpark.nl

Oosterpark Stadion (Dutch pronunciation: [ˌoːstərˈpɑr(ə)k ˈstaːdijɔn]) was the stadium of football club FC Groningen until December 2005. The all-seater stadium in Groningen's Oosterpark neighbourhood was inaugurated on 30 September 1933 and renovated in 1960, 1984 and 1987/88. The stadium has been replaced by the new, larger Euroborg stadium, and the ground it occupied is being redeveloped.

The stadium's peak capacity was 22,000 spectators (in 1985). At the time of the demolition, the capacity was 11,224.

Clubs that played in the stadium earlier are BRC, GVAV Rapiditas and De Oosterparkers. The best visited game ever was FC Groningen - Servette FC with 19,500 spectators.

On 22 December 2005, the last match of FC Groningen in the stadium took place, the KNVB Beker match against FC Volendam. The supporters made a very last trip from the Grote Markt in Groningen with torches and fireworks. The match ended in a 3–0 victory for FC Groningen, and the last goal in the Oosterpark was scored by Glen Salmon.

The stadium in Groningen hosted two international matches of the Netherlands national football team in the early 1980s, both won by the home side 3-0. The first one was a qualifying match for 1982 FIFA World Cup on 22 February 1981 against Cyprus with goals scored by Hugo Hovenkamp, Cees Schapendonk and Dick Nanninga; this match was notable because Hovenkamp and Nanninga were players who were born in the Oosterpark-area of Groningen. The second and the last one was a qualifying match for Euro 1984 on 7 September 1983 against Iceland with goals scored by Ronald Koeman, Ruud Gullit and Peter Houtman.

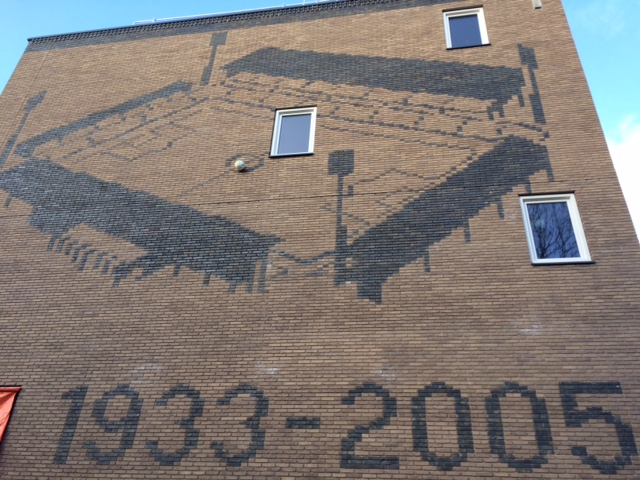
A mosaic of the Oosterpark stadium on a house occupying the stadium's former location
