= Silvio Demanuele =

Maltese footballer (1961–2026)

Personal information
- Date of birth: 17 July 1961
- Place of birth: Malta
- Date of death: 16 November 2026 (aged 65)
- Position: Forward

Senior career*
Years	Team	Apps	(Gls)
–1983	Floriana		

International career
1983	Malta	7	(1)
- * Club domestic league appearances and goals

Silvio Demanuele (17 July 1961 – 16 November 2026) was a Maltese footballer who played as a forward. He played for Floriana and the Malta national team.

== Career ==
Demanuele played for Floriana until 1983.

Demanuele made seven appearances for Malta.

== Death ==
Demanuele died on 16 November 2026, at the age of 65.
