= UEFA Euro 1980 qualifying =

Tournament details
- Dates: 24 May 1978 – 26 March 1980
- Teams: 31

Tournament statistics
- Matches played: 108
- Goals scored: 327 (3.03 per match)
- Top scorer: (England) Kevin Keegan (7 goals)

The qualifying round for UEFA Euro 1980 consisted of 31 teams divided into seven groups; three of five teams and four of four teams. The qualifying round (drawn in Rome on 30 November 1977) was played at various times between May 1978 and February 1980, with some groups concluding earlier than others.

== Qualified teams ==
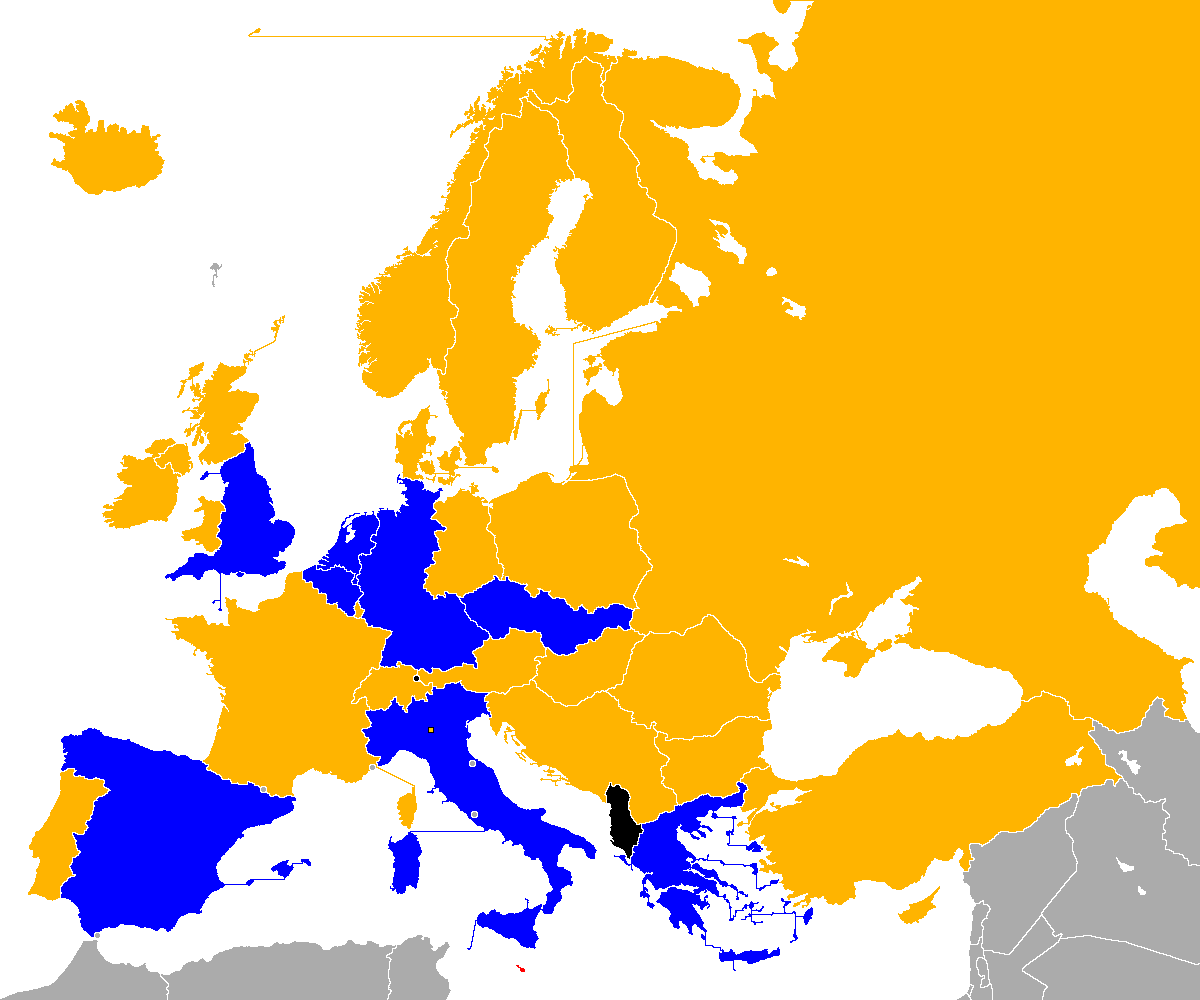
Qualified Did not qualify Did not enter Not a UEFA member

Team	Qualified as	Qualified on	Previous appearances in tournament (Note: Bold indicates champion for that year. Italic indicates host for that year.)
Italy	Host	12 November 1977	1 (**1968**)
Greece	Group 6 winner	31 October 1979	0 (debut)
England	Group 1 winner	21 November 1979	1 (1968)
Netherlands	Group 4 winner	21 November 1979	1 (1976)
Czechoslovakia	Group 5 winner	24 November 1979	2 (1960, **1976**)
Spain	Group 3 winner	9 December 1979	1 (**1964**)
Belgium	Group 2 winner	19 December 1979	1 (1972)
West Germany	Group 7 winner	22 December 1979	2 (**1972**, 1976)

== Summary ==
Group winners qualified directly for UEFA Euro 1980
Other teams were eliminated

Group 1	Group 2	Group 3	Group 4	Group 5	Group 6	Group 7
England	Belgium	Spain	Netherlands	Czechoslovakia	Greece	West Germany
Northern Ireland Republic of Ireland Bulgaria Denmark	Austria Portugal Scotland Norway	Yugoslavia Romania Cyprus	Poland East Germany Switzerland Iceland	France Sweden Luxembourg	Hungary Finland Soviet Union	Turkey Wales Malta

== Tiebreakers ==
If two or more teams finished level on points after completion of the group matches, the following tie-breakers were used to determine the final ranking:

1. Greater number of points in all group matches
2. Goal difference in all group matches
3. Greater number of goals scored in all group matches
4. Drawing of lots

== Groups ==
Four groups of four teams and three groups of five teams competed for qualification for UEFA Euro 1980. The teams played home and away matches against the other teams in their group. The seven teams that acquired the most points to win their respective group qualified for the main tournament, joining the host nation Italy.

=== Group 1 ===
Pos	Team	Pld	W	D	L	GF	GA	GD	Pts	Qualification	(England)	(Northern Ireland)	(Republic of Ireland)	(Bulgaria)	(Denmark)
1	England	8	7	1	0	22	5	+17	**15**	Qualify for final tournament	—	4–0	2–0	2–0	1–0
2	Northern Ireland	8	4	1	3	8	14	−6	**9**		1–5	—	1–0	2–0	2–1
3	Republic of Ireland	8	2	3	3	9	8	+1	**7**		1–1	0–0	—	3–0	2–0
4	Bulgaria	8	2	1	5	6	14	−8	**5**		0–3	0–2	1–0	—	3–0
5	Denmark	8	1	2	5	13	17	−4	**4**		3–4	4–0	3–3	2–2	—

Source: UEFA

=== Group 2 ===
Pos	Team	Pld	W	D	L	GF	GA	GD	Pts	Qualification	(Belgium)	(Austria)	(Portugal)	(Scotland)	(Norway)
1	Belgium	8	4	4	0	12	5	+7	**12**	Qualify for final tournament	—	1–1	2–0	2–0	1–1
2	Austria	8	4	3	1	14	7	+7	**11**		0–0	—	1–2	3–2	4–0
3	Portugal	8	4	1	3	10	11	−1	**9**		1–1	1–2	—	1–0	3–1
4	Scotland	8	3	1	4	15	13	+2	**7**		1–3	1–1	4–1	—	3–2
5	Norway	8	0	1	7	5	20	−15	**1**		1–2	0–2	0–1	0–4	—

Source: UEFA

=== Group 3 ===
Pos	Team	Pld	W	D	L	GF	GA	GD	Pts	Qualification	(Spain)	(Socialist Federal Republic of Yugoslavia)	(Romania)	(Cyprus)
1	Spain	6	4	1	1	13	5	+8	**9**	Qualify for final tournament	—	0–1	1–0	5–0
2	Yugoslavia	6	4	0	2	14	6	+8	**8**		1–2	—	2–1	5–0
3	Romania	6	2	2	2	9	8	+1	**6**		2–2	3–2	—	2–0
4	Cyprus	6	0	1	5	2	19	−17	**1**		1–3	0–3	1–1	—

Source: UEFA

=== Group 4 ===
Pos	Team	Pld	W	D	L	GF	GA	GD	Pts	Qualification	(Netherlands)	(Poland)	(East Germany)	(Switzerland)	(Iceland)
1	Netherlands	8	6	1	1	20	6	+14	**13**	Qualify for final tournament	—	1–1	3–0	3–0	3–0
2	Poland	8	5	2	1	13	4	+9	**12**		2–0	—	1–1	2–0	2–0
3	East Germany	8	5	1	2	18	11	+7	**11**		2–3	2–1	—	5–2	3–1
4	Switzerland	8	2	0	6	7	18	−11	**4**		1–3	0–2	0–2	—	2–0
5	Iceland	8	0	0	8	2	21	−19	**0**		0–4	0–2	0–3	1–2	—

Source: UEFA

=== Group 5 ===
Pos	Team	Pld	W	D	L	GF	GA	GD	Pts	Qualification	(Czechoslovakia)	(France)	(Sweden)	(Luxembourg)
1	Czechoslovakia	6	5	0	1	17	4	+13	**10**	Qualify for final tournament	—	2–0	4–1	4–0
2	France	6	4	1	1	13	7	+6	**9**		2–1	—	2–2	3–0
3	Sweden	6	1	2	3	9	13	−4	**4**		1–3	1–3	—	3–0
4	Luxembourg	6	0	1	5	2	17	−15	**1**		0–3	1–3	1–1	—

Source: UEFA

=== Group 6 ===
Pos	Team	Pld	W	D	L	GF	GA	GD	Pts	Qualification	(Greece)	(Hungary)	(Finland)	(Soviet Union)
1	Greece	6	3	1	2	13	7	+6	**7**	Qualify for final tournament	—	4–1	8–1	1–0
2	Hungary	6	2	2	2	9	9	0	**6**		0–0	—	3–1	2–0
3	Finland	6	2	2	2	10	15	−5	**6**		3–0	2–1	—	1–1
4	Soviet Union	6	1	3	2	7	8	−1	**5**		2–0	2–2	2–2	—

Source: UEFA

=== Group 7 ===
Pos	Team	Pld	W	D	L	GF	GA	GD	Pts	Qualification	(West Germany)	(Turkey)	(Wales)	(Malta)
1	West Germany	6	4	2	0	17	1	+16	**10**	Qualify for final tournament	—	2–0	5–1	8–0
2	Turkey	6	3	1	2	5	5	0	**7**		0–0	—	1–0	2–1
3	Wales	6	3	0	3	11	8	+3	**6**		0–2	1–0	—	7–0
4	Malta	6	0	1	5	2	21	−19	**1**		0–0	1–2	0–2	—

Source: UEFA

== Goalscorers ==
There were 327 goals scored in 108 matches, for an average of 3.03 goals per match.

7 goals

- (England national football team) Kevin Keegan

6 goals

- (Germany national football team) Klaus Fischer

5 goals

- (Belgium national football team) François Van der Elst
- (Czechoslovakia national football team) Marián Masný

4 goals

- (Austria national football team) Hans Krankl
- (East Germany national football team) Martin Hoffmann
- (East Germany national football team) Joachim Streich
- (England national football team) Bob Latchford
- (Finland national football team) Atik Ismail
- (Greece national football team) Thomas Mavros
- (Scotland national football team) Kenny Dalglish
- (Spain national football team) Santillana
- (Wales national football team) Ian Edwards
- (Yugoslavia national football team) Zlatko Vujović

3 goals

- (Austria national football team) Walter Schachner
- (Bulgaria national football team) Chavdar Tsvetkov
- (Czechoslovakia national football team) Ladislav Vízek
- (Denmark national football team) Preben Elkjær
- (East Germany national football team) Gerd Weber
- (England national football team) David Watson
- (Greece national football team) Maik Galakos
- (Greece national football team) Takis Nikoloudis
- (Netherlands national football team) Ruud Geels
- (Northern Ireland national football team) Gerry Armstrong
- (Poland national football team) Zbigniew Boniek
- (Poland national football team) Roman Ogaza
- (Portugal national football team) Nené
- (Republic of Ireland national football team) Gerry Daly
- (Scotland national football team) Archie Gemmill
- (Sweden men's national football team) Anders Grönhagen

2 goals

- (Austria national football team) Wilhelm Kreuz
- (Austria national football team) Bruno Pezzey
- (Czechoslovakia national football team) Ján Kozák
- (Czechoslovakia national football team) Zdeněk Nehoda
- (Czechoslovakia national football team) Antonín Panenka
- (Czechoslovakia national football team) František Štambachr
- (Denmark national football team) Henning Jensen
- (Denmark national football team) Søren Lerby
- (Denmark national football team) Benny Nielsen
- (Denmark national football team) Allan Simonsen
- (East Germany national football team) Lutz Lindemann
- (East Germany national football team) Rüdiger Schnuphase
- (England national football team) Trevor Francis
- (England national football team) Tony Woodcock
- (France national football team) Didier Six
- (Greece national football team) Georgios Delikaris
- (Hungary national football team) László Fekete
- (Hungary national football team) György Tatár
- (Hungary national football team) Béla Várady
- (Netherlands national football team) Ernie Brandts
- (Netherlands national football team) Kees Kist
- (Netherlands national football team) John Metgod
- (Netherlands national football team) Dick Nanninga
- (Netherlands national football team) Willy van de Kerkhof
- (Norway national football team) Arne Larsen Økland
- (Poland national football team) Stanisław Terlecki
- (Portugal national football team) Alberto Fonseca
- (Republic of Ireland national football team) Tony Grealish
- (Republic of Ireland national football team) Frank Stapleton
- (Romania national football team) Dudu Georgescu
- (Romania national football team) Marcel Răducanu
- (Romania national football team) Ștefan Sameș
- (Scotland national football team) Andy Gray
- (Scotland national football team) Gordon McQueen
- (Scotland national football team) John Robertson
- (Soviet Union national football team) Yuri Chesnokov
- (Spain national football team) Juan Manuel Asensi
- (Spain national football team) Dani
- (Sweden men's national football team) Hasse Borg
- (Turkey national football team) Sedat Özden
- (Wales national football team) Brian Flynn
- (Germany national football team) Klaus Allofs
- (Germany national football team) Karl-Heinz Rummenigge
- (Germany national football team) Herbert Zimmermann
- (Yugoslavia national football team) Zlatko Kranjčar
- (Yugoslavia national football team) Vladimir Petrović
- (Yugoslavia national football team) Ivica Šurjak

1 goal

- (Austria national football team) Kurt Jara
- (Austria national football team) Herbert Prohaska
- (Austria national football team) Kurt Welzl
- (Belgium national football team) Julien Cools
- (Belgium national football team) Jean Janssens
- (Belgium national football team) Erwin Vandenbergh
- (Belgium national football team) René Vandereycken
- (Belgium national football team) Wilfried Van Moer
- (Belgium national football team) Franky Vercauteren
- (Belgium national football team) Eddy Voordeckers
- (Bulgaria national football team) Ivan Iliev
- (Bulgaria national football team) Pavel Panov
- (Bulgaria national football team) Andrey Zhelyazkov
- (Cyprus national football team) Sotiris Kaiafas
- (Cyprus national football team) Fivos Vrahimis
- (Czechoslovakia national football team) Miroslav Gajdůšek
- (Denmark national football team) Frank Arnesen
- (Denmark national football team) Per Røntved
- (East Germany national football team) Reinhard Häfner
- (East Germany national football team) Werner Peter
- (East Germany national football team) Hans-Jürgen Riediger
- (England national football team) Peter Barnes
- (England national football team) Glenn Hoddle
- (England national football team) Phil Neal
- (Finland national football team) Kai Haaskivi
- (Finland national football team) Tuomo Hakala
- (Finland national football team) Aki Heiskanen
- (Finland national football team) Jyrki Nieminen
- (Finland national football team) Seppo Pyykkö
- (Finland national football team) Miikka Toivola
- (France national football team) Patrick Battiston
- (France national football team) Marc Berdoll
- (France national football team) Albert Emon
- (France national football team) Albert Gemmrich
- (France national football team) Bernard Lacombe
- (France national football team) Jean-François Larios
- (France national football team) Éric Pécout
- (France national football team) Jean Petit
- (France national football team) Michel Platini
- (France national football team) Gilles Rampillon
- (France national football team) Marius Trésor
- (Greece national football team) Christos Ardizoglou
- (Hungary national football team) László Pusztai
- (Hungary national football team) László Szokolai
- (Hungary national football team) László Tieber
- (Iceland national football team) Janus Guðlaugsson
- (Iceland national football team) Pétur Pétursson
- (Luxembourg national football team) Nico Braun
- (Luxembourg national football team) Romain Michaux
- (Malta national football team) Emanuel Farrugia
- (Malta national football team) Ernest Spiteri-Gonzi
- (Netherlands national football team) Ruud Krol
- (Netherlands national football team) Jan Peters
- (Netherlands national football team) Rob Rensenbrink
- (Netherlands national football team) Huub Stevens
- (Netherlands national football team) Frans Thijssen
- (Netherlands national football team) Piet Wildschut
- (Northern Ireland national football team) Trevor Anderson
- (Northern Ireland national football team) Billy Caskey
- (Northern Ireland national football team) Victor Moreland
- (Northern Ireland national football team) Chris Nicholl
- (Northern Ireland national football team) Derek Spence
- (Norway national football team) Einar Jan Aas
- (Norway national football team) Georg Hammer
- (Norway national football team) Pål Jacobsen
- (Poland national football team) Marek Kusto
- (Poland national football team) Grzegorz Lato
- (Poland national football team) Włodzimierz Mazur
- (Poland national football team) Wojciech Rudy
- (Poland national football team) Henryk Wieczorek
- (Portugal national football team) João Resende Alves
- (Portugal national football team) Artur Correia
- (Portugal national football team) Eurico Gomes
- (Portugal national football team) Fernando Gomes
- (Portugal national football team) Reinaldo Gomes
- (Republic of Ireland national football team) Don Givens
- (Republic of Ireland national football team) Mick Martin
- (Romania national football team) Ionel Augustin
- (Romania national football team) Anghel Iordănescu
- (Romania national football team) Gheorghe Mulțescu
- (Scotland national football team) Steve Archibald
- (Scotland national football team) Joe Jordan
- (Soviet Union national football team) Sergey Andreyev
- (Soviet Union national football team) Volodymyr Bezsonov
- (Soviet Union national football team) Yuri Gavrilov
- (Soviet Union national football team) Aleksandr Khapsalis
- (Soviet Union national football team) Ramaz Shengelia
- (Spain national football team) Rubén Cano
- (Spain national football team) Vicente del Bosque
- (Spain national football team) Juanito
- (Spain national football team) Enrique Saura
- (Spain national football team) Ángel María Villar
- (Sweden men's national football team) Rutger Backe
- (Sweden men's national football team) Tore Cervin
- (Sweden men's national football team) Mats Nordgren
- (Sweden men's national football team) Jan Svensson
- (Switzerland national football team) Umberto Barberis
- (Switzerland national football team) Heinz Hermann
- (Switzerland national football team) Herbert Hermann
- (Switzerland national football team) Hans-Jörg Pfister
- (Switzerland national football team) Raimondo Ponte
- (Switzerland national football team) Markus Tanner
- (Switzerland national football team) Gian-Pietro Zappa
- (Turkey national football team) Mustafa Denizli
- (Turkey national football team) Erhan Önal
- (Turkey national football team) Fatih Terim
- (Wales national football team) Alan Curtis
- (Wales national football team) Nick Deacy
- (Wales national football team) Peter Nicholas
- (Wales national football team) Peter O'Sullivan
- (Wales national football team) Mickey Thomas
- (Germany national football team) Rainer Bonhof
- (Germany national football team) Karlheinz Förster
- (Germany national football team) Manfred Kaltz
- (Germany national football team) Walter Kelsch
- (Yugoslavia national football team) Damir Desnica
- (Yugoslavia national football team) Vahid Halilhodžić
- (Yugoslavia national football team) Dušan Savić
- (Yugoslavia national football team) Blaž Slišković

1 own goal

- (East Germany national football team) Gerd Kische (against Netherlands)
- (Malta national football team) John Holland (against West Germany)
- (Northern Ireland national football team) Jimmy Nicholl (against England)
