= UEFA Euro 1980 qualifying Group 7 =

Football tournament qualification stage

Standings and results for Group 7 of the UEFA Euro 1980 qualifying tournament.

Group 7 consisted of West Germany, Wales, Turkey and Malta. West Germany easily won the group, outrunning Turkey by three points.

== Final table ==
Pos	Team	Pld	W	D	L	GF	GA	GD	Pts	Qualification	(West Germany)	(Turkey)	(Wales)	(Malta)
1	West Germany	6	4	2	0	17	1	+16	10	Qualify for final tournament	—	2–0	5–1	8–0
2	Turkey	6	3	1	2	5	5	0	7		0–0	—	1–0	2–1
3	Wales	6	3	0	3	11	8	+3	6		0–2	1–0	—	7–0
4	Malta	6	0	1	5	2	21	−19	1		0–0	1–2	0–2	—

Source: UEFA
Rules for classification: Qualification tiebreakers

== Results ==
25 October 1978

Wales	7–0	Malta
O'Sullivan 18'; Edwards 20', 45', 48', 51'; Thomas 71'; Flynn 82'	Report

Racecourse Ground, Wrexham
Attendance: 11,475
Referee: Magnus V. Pétursson (Iceland)

29 November 1978

Wales	1–0	Turkey
Deacy 70'	Report

Racecourse Ground, Wrexham
Attendance: 11,798
Referee: Alojzy Jarguz (Poland)

25 February 1979

Malta	0–0	West Germany
	Report

Empire Stadium, Gżira
Attendance: 8,450
Referee: Vojtech Christov (Czechoslovakia)

18 March 1979

Turkey	2–1	Malta
Özden 34'; Terim 56'	Report	Spiteri-Gonzi 52'

Alsancak Stadium, İzmir
Attendance: 34,154
Referee: Tome Manojlovski (Yugoslavia)

1 April 1979

Turkey	0–0	West Germany
	Report

Alsancak Stadium, İzmir
Attendance: 69,800
Referee: Myroslav Stupar (Soviet Union)

2 May 1979

Wales	0–2	West Germany
	Report	Zimmermann 30'; Fischer 52'

Racecourse Ground, Wrexham
Attendance: 26,975
Referee: Alberto Michelotti (Italy)

2 June 1979

Malta	0–2	Wales
	Report	Nicholas 15'; Flynn 51'

Empire Stadium, Gżira
Attendance: 8,358
Referee: Nikolaos Lagoyannis (Greece)

17 October 1979

West Germany	5–1	Wales
Fischer 21', 38'; Kaltz 32'; Rummenigge 42'; Förster 83'	Report	Curtis 84'

Müngersdorfer Stadion, Cologne
Attendance: 53,390
Referee: Jan Keizer (Netherlands)

28 October 1979

Malta	1–2	Turkey
Farrugia 62'	Report	Özden 20'; Denizli 25'

Empire Stadium, Gżira
Attendance: 1,976
Referee: Gianfranco Menegali (Italy)

21 November 1979

Turkey	1–0	Wales
Önal 80'	Report

Alsancak Stadium, İzmir
Attendance: 30,650
Referee: Constantin Ghiță (Romania)

22 December 1979

West Germany	2–0	Turkey
Fischer 15'; Zimmermann 89'	Report

Parkstadion, Gelsenkirchen
Attendance: 68,270
Referee: Rudolf Renggli (Switzerland)

27 February 1980

West Germany	8–0	Malta
Allofs 14', 55'; Bonhof 19' (pen.); Fischer 40', 90'; Holland 61' (o.g.); Kelsch 70'; Rummenigge 74'	Report

Weserstadion, Bremen
Attendance: 33,278
Referee: Norbert Rolles (Luxembourg)

== Goalscorers ==
There were 35 goals scored in 12 matches, for an average of 2.92 goals per match.

6 goals

- (West Germany) Klaus Fischer

4 goals

- (Wales) Ian Edwards

2 goals

- (Turkey) Sedat Özden
- (Wales) Brian Flynn
- (West Germany) Klaus Allofs
- (West Germany) Karl-Heinz Rummenigge
- (West Germany) Herbert Zimmermann

1 goal

- (Malta) Emanuel Farrugia
- (Malta) Ernest Spiteri-Gonzi
- (Turkey) Mustafa Denizli
- (Turkey) Erhan Önal
- (Turkey) Fatih Terim
- (Wales) Alan Curtis
- (Wales) Nick Deacy
- (Wales) Peter Nicholas
- (Wales) Peter O'Sullivan
- (Wales) Mickey Thomas
- (West Germany) Rainer Bonhof
- (West Germany) Karlheinz Förster
- (West Germany) Manfred Kaltz
- (West Germany) Walter Kelsch

1 own goal

- (Malta) John Holland (against West Germany)
