= UEFA Euro 1980 qualifying Group 1 =

Football tournament qualification stage

Standings and results for Group 1 of the UEFA Euro 1980 qualifying tournament.

Group 1 consisted of Bulgaria, Denmark, England, Northern Ireland and Republic of Ireland. The draw paired together the two Irelands for the first time in International competition. Group winners were England, who went undefeated in qualifying, finishing 6 points clear of second-placed Northern Ireland. In doing so, England ended a decade of failing to qualify for a major international tournament, having last appeared at the 1970 FIFA World Cup.

== Final table ==
Pos	Team	Pld	W	D	L	GF	GA	GD	Pts	Qualification	(England)	(Northern Ireland)	(Republic of Ireland)	(Bulgaria)	(Denmark)
1	England	8	7	1	0	22	5	+17	15	Qualify for final tournament	—	4–0	2–0	2–0	1–0
2	Northern Ireland	8	4	1	3	8	14	−6	9		1–5	—	1–0	2–0	2–1
3	Republic of Ireland	8	2	3	3	9	8	+1	7		1–1	0–0	—	3–0	2–0
4	Bulgaria	8	2	1	5	6	14	−8	5		0–3	0–2	1–0	—	3–0
5	Denmark	8	1	2	5	13	17	−4	4		3–4	4–0	3–3	2–2	—

Source: UEFA
Rules for classification: Qualification tiebreakers

== Results ==
24 May 1978

Denmark	3–3	Republic of Ireland
Jensen 32'; B. Nielsen 79' (pen.); Lerby 80'		Stapleton 11'; Grealish 25'; Daly 65'

Parken Stadium, Copenhagen
Attendance: 28,900
Referee: Beck (NED)

20 September 1978

Republic of Ireland	0–0	Northern Ireland

Lansdowne Road, Dublin
Attendance: 37,681
Referee: Rion (BEL)

20 September 1978

Denmark	3–4	England
Simonsen 25' (pen.); Arnesen 28'; Røntved 86'		Keegan 17', 23'; Latchford 50'; Neal 85'

Parken Stadium, Copenhagen
Attendance: 47,600
Referee: Prokop (GDR)

11 October 1978

Denmark	2–2	Bulgaria
B. Nielsen 17'; Lerby 63'		Panov 34'; Iliev 84'

Parken Stadium, Copenhagen
Attendance: 15,800
Referee: Martínez (ESP)

25 October 1978

Republic of Ireland	1–1	England
Daly 27'		Latchford 8'

Lansdowne Road, Dublin
Attendance: 48,613
Referee: Aldinger (FRG)

25 October 1978

Northern Ireland	2–1	Denmark
Spence 63'; Anderson 85'		Jensen 51'

Windsor Park, Belfast
Attendance: 20,184
Referee: Haugen (NOR)

29 November 1978

Bulgaria	0–2	Northern Ireland
		Armstrong 17'; Caskey 83'

Vasil Levski National Stadium, Sofia
Attendance: 11,048
Referee: Ok (TUR)

7 February 1979

England	4–0	Northern Ireland
Keegan 24'; Latchford 46', 63'; Watson 49'

Wembley Stadium, London
Attendance: 91,224
Referee: Eriksson (SWE)

2 May 1979

Republic of Ireland	2–0	Denmark
Daly 44'; Givens 66'

Lansdowne Road, Dublin
Attendance: 37,260
Referee: Vautrot (FRA)

2 May 1979

Northern Ireland	2–0	Bulgaria
Nicholl 16'; Armstrong 30'

Windsor Park, Belfast
Attendance: 15,540
Referee: Mattsson (FIN)

19 May 1979

Bulgaria	1–0	Republic of Ireland
Tsvetkov 81'

Vasil Levski National Stadium, Sofia
Attendance: 10,896
Referee: Bucek (AUT)

6 June 1979

Bulgaria	0–3	England
		Keegan 7'; Watson 53'; Barnes 54'

Vasil Levski National Stadium, Sofia
Attendance: 31,322
Referee: Dörflinger-Buser (SUI)

6 June 1979

Denmark	4–0	Northern Ireland
Elkjær 13', 33', 83'; Simonsen 64'

Parken Stadium, Copenhagen
Attendance: 16,800
Referee: Frickel (FRG)

12 September 1979

England	1–0	Denmark
Keegan 17'

Wembley Stadium, London
Attendance: 88,660
Referee: Da Luz (POR)

17 October 1979

Republic of Ireland	3–0	Bulgaria
Martin 39'; Grealish 46'; Stapleton 83'

Lansdowne Road, Dublin
Attendance: 18,909
Referee: Einbeck (GDR)

17 October 1979

Northern Ireland	1–5	England
Moreland 50' (pen.)		Francis 18', 62'; Woodcock 34', 57'; Nicholl 74' (o.g.)

Windsor Park, Belfast
Attendance: 17,755
Referee: Ponnet (BEL)

31 October 1979

Bulgaria	3–0	Denmark
Zhelyazkov 21'; Tsvetkov 51', 88'

Vasil Levski National Stadium, Sofia
Attendance: 19,384
Referee: Afxentiou (CYP)

21 November 1979

Northern Ireland	1–0	Republic of Ireland
Armstrong 54'

Windsor Park, Belfast
Attendance: 13,215
Referee: Daina (SUI)

22 November 1979

England	2–0	Bulgaria
Watson 9'; Hoddle 68'

Wembley Stadium, London
Attendance: 85,621
Referee: Fredriksson (SWE)

6 February 1980

England	2–0	Republic of Ireland
Keegan 34', 74'

Wembley Stadium, London
Attendance: 91,043
Referee: Scheurell (GDR)

== Goalscorers ==
There were 58 goals scored in 20 matches, for an average of 2.9 goals per match.

7 goals

- (England) Kevin Keegan

4 goals

- (England) Bob Latchford

3 goals

- (Bulgaria) Chavdar Tsvetkov
- (Denmark) Preben Elkjær
- (England) David Watson
- (Northern Ireland) Gerry Armstrong
- (Republic of Ireland) Gerry Daly

2 goals

- (Denmark) Henning Jensen
- (Denmark) Søren Lerby
- (Denmark) Benny Nielsen
- (Denmark) Allan Simonsen
- (England) Trevor Francis
- (England) Tony Woodcock
- (Republic of Ireland) Tony Grealish
- (Republic of Ireland) Frank Stapleton

1 goal

- (Bulgaria) Ivan Iliev
- (Bulgaria) Pavel Panov
- (Bulgaria) Andrey Zhelyazkov
- (Denmark) Frank Arnesen
- (Denmark) Per Røntved
- (England) Peter Barnes
- (England) Glenn Hoddle
- (England) Phil Neal
- (Northern Ireland) Trevor Anderson
- (Northern Ireland) Billy Caskey
- (Northern Ireland) Victor Moreland
- (Northern Ireland) Chris Nicholl
- (Northern Ireland) Derek Spence
- (Republic of Ireland) Don Givens
- (Republic of Ireland) Mick Martin

1 own goal

- (Northern Ireland) Jimmy Nicholl (against England)
