= 1978–79 in Scottish football =

Premier Division champions
- Celtic

First Division champions
- Dundee

Second Division champions
- Berwick Rangers

Scottish Cup winners
- Rangers

League Cup winners
- Rangers

Junior Cup winners
- Cumnock Juniors

Teams in Europe
- Aberdeen, Dundee United, Hibernian, Rangers

Scotland national team
- 1979 BHC, UEFA Euro 1980 qualifying
- ← 1977–78 1979–80 →

The 1978–79 season was the 106th season of competitive football in Scotland and the 82nd season of Scottish league football.

== Scottish Premier Division ==
Pos	Team	Pld	W	D	L	GF	GA	GD	Pts	Qualification or relegation
1	Celtic (C)	36	21	6	9	61	37	+24	48	Qualification for the European Cup first round
2	Rangers	36	18	9	9	52	35	+17	45	Qualification for the Cup Winners' Cup first round
3	Dundee United	36	18	8	10	56	37	+19	44	Qualification for the UEFA Cup first round
4	Aberdeen	36	13	14	9	59	36	+23	40	Qualification for the UEFA Cup first round
5	Hibernian	36	12	13	11	44	48	−4	37	
6	St Mirren	36	15	6	15	45	41	+4	36	
7	Morton	36	12	12	12	52	53	−1	36	
8	Partick Thistle	36	13	8	15	42	39	+3	34	
9	Heart of Midlothian (R)	36	8	7	21	39	71	−32	23	Relegation to the 1979–80 Scottish First Division
10	Motherwell (R)	36	5	7	24	33	86	−53	17	Relegation to the 1979–80 Scottish First Division

Source: Statto and RSSSF
Rules for classification: 1) points; 2) goal difference; 3) number of goals scored.
(C) Champions; (R) Relegated

Champions: Celtic
Relegated: Hearts, Motherwell

== Scottish League First Division ==
Pos	Team	Pld	W	D	L	GF	GA	GD	Pts	Promotion or relegation
1	Dundee (C, P)	39	24	7	8	69	36	+33	55	Promotion to the Premier Division
2	Kilmarnock (P)	39	22	10	7	72	36	+36	54	Promotion to the Premier Division
3	Clydebank	39	24	6	9	78	50	+28	54	
4	Ayr United	39	21	5	13	73	54	+19	47	
5	Hamilton Academical	39	17	9	13	63	61	+2	43	
6	Airdrieonians	39	16	8	15	72	61	+11	40	
7	Dumbarton	39	14	11	14	58	50	+8	39	
8	Stirling Albion	39	13	9	17	43	55	−12	35	
9	Clyde	39	13	8	18	54	65	−11	34	
10	Arbroath	39	11	11	17	50	61	−11	33	
11	Raith Rovers	39	12	8	19	48	55	−7	32	
12	St Johnstone	39	10	11	18	57	66	−9	31	
13	Montrose (R)	39	8	9	22	55	92	−37	25	Relegation to the Second Division
14	Queen of the South (R)	39	8	8	23	43	93	−50	24	Relegation to the Second Division

Source: RSSSF and statto
Rules for classification: 1) points; 2) goal difference; 3) number of goals scored.
(C) Champions; (P) Promoted; (R) Relegated

Promoted: Dundee, Kilmarnock
Relegated: Montrose, Queen of the South

== Scottish League Second Division ==
Pos	Team	Pld	W	D	L	GF	GA	GD	Pts	Promotion
1	Berwick Rangers (C, P)	39	22	10	7	82	44	+38	54	Promotion to the First Division
2	Dunfermline Athletic (P)	39	19	14	6	66	40	+26	52	Promotion to the First Division
3	Falkirk	39	19	12	8	66	37	+29	50	
4	East Fife	39	17	9	13	64	53	+11	43	
5	Cowdenbeath	39	16	10	13	63	58	+5	42	
6	Alloa Athletic	39	16	9	14	57	62	−5	41	
7	Albion Rovers	39	15	10	14	57	56	+1	40	
8	Forfar Athletic	39	13	12	14	55	52	+3	38	
9	Stranraer	39	18	2	19	52	66	−14	38	
10	Stenhousemuir	39	12	8	19	54	58	−4	32	
11	Brechin City	39	9	14	16	49	65	−16	32	
12	East Stirlingshire	39	12	8	19	61	87	−26	32	
13	Queen's Park	39	8	12	19	46	57	−11	28	
14	Meadowbank Thistle	39	8	8	23	37	74	−37	24	

Source: "1978-1979 Second Division - SPFL Archive". SPFL.
Rules for classification: 1) points; 2) goal difference; 3) number of goals scored.
(C) Champions; (P) Promoted

Promoted: Berwick Rangers, Dunfermline Athletic

== Cup honours ==
Competition	Winner	Score	Runner-up
Scottish Cup 1978–79	Rangers	3 – 2 (2nd rep.)	Hibernian
League Cup 1978–79	Rangers	2 – 1	Aberdeen
Junior Cup	Cumnock Juniors	1 – 0	Bo'ness United

== Other honours ==
=== National ===
Competition	Winner	Score	Runner-up
Scottish Qualifying Cup – North	Brora Rangers	5 – 0 †	Peterhead
Scottish Qualifying Cup – South	Spartans	2 – 0 *	Coldstream

=== County ===
Competition	Winner	Score	Runner-up
Aberdeenshire Cup	Peterhead		
Ayrshire Cup	Kilmarnock	4 – 0	Girvan
Fife Cup	East Fife	2 – 2 * ‡	Raith Rovers
Forfarshire Cup	Forfar Athletic	3 – 1	Dundee
Glasgow Cup	Rangers	3 – 1	Celtic
Renfrewshire Cup	St Mirren	10 – 1 *	Morton
Stirlingshire Cup	Clydebank	1 – 0	Dumbarton

^{*} – aggregate over two legs
† – replay
‡ – won on penalties

=== Highland League ===
Top Three
Pos	Team	Pld	W	D	L	GF	GA	GD	Pts
1	Keith	30	21	6	3	67	25	+42	48
2	Inverness Caledonian	30	20	5	5	67	25	+42	45
3	Peterhead	30	19	5	6	62	32	+30	43

== Individual honours ==
Award	Winner	Club
Footballer of the Year	(Scotland) Andy Ritchie	Morton
Players' Player of the Year	(Scotland) Paul Hegarty	Dundee United
Young Player of the Year	(Scotland) Ray Stewart	Dundee United

== Scotland national team ==
Date	Venue	Opponents	Score	Competition	Scotland scorer(s)
20 September 1978	Praterstadion, Vienna (A)	Austria	2–3	ECQG2	Gordon McQueen, Andy Gray
25 October 1978	Hampden Park, Glasgow (H)	Norway	3–2	ECQG2	Kenny Dalglish (2), Archie Gemmill
29 November 1978	Estadio da Luz, Lisbon (A)	Portugal	0–1	ECQG2	
19 May 1979	Ninian Park, Cardiff (A)	Wales	0–3	BHC	
22 May 1979	Hampden Park, Glasgow (H)	Northern Ireland	1–0	BHC	Arthur Graham
26 May 1979	Wembley Stadium, London (A)	England	1–3	BHC	John Wark
2 June 1979	Hampden Park, Glasgow (H)	Argentina	1–3	Friendly	Arthur Graham
7 June 1979	Ullevaal Stadion, Oslo (A)	Norway	4–0	ECQG2	Kenny Dalglish, Joe Jordan, Gordon McQueen, John Robertson

1979 British Home Championship – Third Place

Key:

- (H) = Home match
- (A) = Away match
- ECQG2 = European Championship qualifying – Group 2
- BHC = British Home Championship
