= UEFA Euro 1980 qualifying Group 2 =

Football tournament qualification stage

Standings and results for Group 2 of the UEFA Euro 1980 qualifying tournament.

Group 2 consisted of Austria, Belgium, Norway, Portugal and Scotland. Group winners were Belgium, who went undefeated in qualifying, edging past Austria.

== Final table ==
Pos	Team	Pld	W	D	L	GF	GA	GD	Pts	Qualification	(Belgium)	(Austria)	(Portugal)	(Scotland)	(Norway)
1	Belgium	8	4	4	0	12	5	+7	12	Qualify for final tournament	—	1–1	2–0	2–0	1–1
2	Austria	8	4	3	1	14	7	+7	11		0–0	—	1–2	3–2	4–0
3	Portugal	8	4	1	3	10	11	−1	9		1–1	1–2	—	1–0	3–1
4	Scotland	8	3	1	4	15	13	+2	7		1–3	1–1	4–1	—	3–2
5	Norway	8	0	1	7	5	20	−15	1		1–2	0–2	0–1	0–4	—

Source: UEFA
Rules for classification: Qualification tiebreakers

== Results ==
30 August 1978

Norway	0 – 2	Austria
		Pezzey 23'; Krankl 43'

Ullevaal Stadium, Oslo
Attendance: 13,075
Referee: Partridge (ENG)

20 September 1978

Austria	3 – 2	Scotland
Pezzey 27'; Schachner 47'; Kreuz 63'		McQueen 64'; Gray 78'

Prater Stadium, Vienna
Attendance: 62,281
Referee: Michelotti (ITA)

20 September 1978

Belgium	1 – 1	Norway
Cools 65'		Økland 8'

Daknam Stadium, Lokeren
Attendance: 5,272
Referee: Raus (YUG)

11 October 1978

Portugal	1 – 1	Belgium
Eurico 31'		Vercauteren 37'

Estádio da Luz, Lisbon
Attendance: 14,401
Referee: Konrath (FRA)

25 October 1978

Scotland	3 – 2	Norway
Dalglish 30', 81'; Gemmill 87' (pen.)		Aas 3'; Økland 64'

Hampden Park, Glasgow
Attendance: 66,656
Referee: Christov (TCH)

15 November 1978

Austria	1 – 2	Portugal
Schachner 71'		Nené 30'; Fonseca 90'

Prater Stadium, Vienna
Attendance: 64,024
Referee: Rainea (ROU)

29 November 1978

Portugal	1 – 0	Scotland
Fonseca 28'

Estádio da Luz, Lisbon
Attendance: 49,153
Referee: Dörflinger-Buser (SUI)

28 March 1979

Belgium	1 – 1	Austria
Vandereycken 21' (pen.)		Krankl 61'

Constant Vanden Stock Stadium, Brussels
Attendance: 6,264
Referee: Martinez (ESP)

2 May 1979

Austria	0 – 0	Belgium

Prater Stadium, Vienna
Attendance: 42,903
Referee: Ok (TUR)

9 May 1979

Norway	0 – 1	Portugal
		Alves 35'

Ullevaal Stadium, Oslo
Attendance: 9,876
Referee: Kirschen (GDR)

7 June 1979

Norway	0 – 4	Scotland
		Jordan 32'; Dalglish 39'; Robertson 43'; McQueen 54'

Ullevaal Stadium, Oslo
Attendance: 17,269
Referee: Nielsen (DEN)

29 August 1979

Austria	4 – 0	Norway
Jara 42'; Prohaska 46' (pen.); Kreuz 75'; Krankl 86'

Prater Stadium, Vienna
Attendance: 30,991
Referee: Fausek (TCH)

12 September 1979

Norway	1 – 2	Belgium
Jacobsen 7'		Janssens 31'; Van der Elst 75'

Ullevaal Stadium, Oslo
Attendance: 11,255
Referee: Jarguz (POL)

17 October 1979

Belgium	2 – 0	Portugal
Van Moer 46'; Van der Elst 56'

Heysel Stadium, Brussels
Attendance: 8,799
Referee: Eriksson (SWE)

17 October 1979

Scotland	1 – 1	Austria
Gemmill 75'		Krankl 11'

Hampden Park, Glasgow
Attendance: 67,895
Referee: Palotai (HUN)

1 November 1979

Portugal	3 – 1	Norway
Correia 37'; Nené 59', 71'		Hammer 10'

Estádio da Luz, Lisbon
Attendance: 34,394
Referee: Lattanzi (ITA)

21 November 1979

Belgium	2 – 0	Scotland
Van der Elst 5'; Voordeckers 47'

Heysel Stadium, Brussels
Attendance: 14,289
Referee: Azim-Zade (URS)

21 November 1979

Portugal	1 – 2	Austria
Reinaldo 42'		Welzl 37'; Schachner 51'

Estádio da Luz, Lisbon
Attendance: 52,815
Referee: Corver (NED)

19 December 1979

Scotland	1 – 3	Belgium
Robertson 55'		Vandenbergh 18'; Van der Elst 23', 28'

Hampden Park, Glasgow
Attendance: 36,804
Referee: Aldinger (FRG)

26 March 1980

Scotland	4 – 1	Portugal
Dalglish 7'; Gray 25'; Archibald 68'; Gemmill 83' (pen.)		Gomes 75'

Hampden Park, Glasgow
Attendance: 26,762
Referee: Wurtz (FRA)

== Goalscorers ==
There were 56 goals scored in 20 matches, for an average of 2.8 goals per match.

5 goals

- (Belgium national football team) François Van der Elst

4 goals

- (Austria national football team) Hans Krankl
- (Scotland national football team) Kenny Dalglish

3 goals

- (Austria national football team) Walter Schachner
- (Portugal national football team) Nené
- (Scotland national football team) Archie Gemmill

2 goals

- (Austria national football team) Wilhelm Kreuz
- (Austria national football team) Bruno Pezzey
- (Norway national football team) Arne Larsen Økland
- (Portugal national football team) Alberto Fonseca
- (Scotland national football team) Andy Gray
- (Scotland national football team) Gordon McQueen
- (Scotland national football team) John Robertson

1 goal

- (Austria national football team) Kurt Jara
- (Austria national football team) Herbert Prohaska
- (Austria national football team) Kurt Welzl
- (Belgium national football team) Julien Cools
- (Belgium national football team) Jean Janssens
- (Belgium national football team) Erwin Vandenbergh
- (Belgium national football team) René Vandereycken
- (Belgium national football team) Wilfried Van Moer
- (Belgium national football team) Franky Vercauteren
- (Belgium national football team) Eddy Voordeckers
- (Norway national football team) Einar Jan Aas
- (Norway national football team) Georg Hammer
- (Norway national football team) Pål Jacobsen
- (Portugal national football team) João Resende Alves
- (Portugal national football team) Artur Correia
- (Portugal national football team) Eurico Gomes
- (Portugal national football team) Fernando Gomes
- (Portugal national football team) Reinaldo Gomes
- (Scotland national football team) Steve Archibald
- (Scotland national football team) Joe Jordan
