= 1979–80 in Scottish football =

Premier Division champions
- Aberdeen

First Division champions
- Heart of Midlothian

Second Division champions
- Falkirk

Scottish Cup winners
- Celtic

League Cup winners
- Dundee United

Junior Cup winners
- Baillieston Juniors

Teams in Europe
- Aberdeen, Celtic, Dundee United, St Mirren

Scotland national team
- 1980 BHC, UEFA Euro 1980 qualifying
- ← 1978–79 1980–81 →

The 1979–80 season was the 107th season of competitive football in Scotland and the 83rd season of Scottish league football.

== Scottish Premier Division ==
Pos	Team	Pld	W	D	L	GF	GA	GD	Pts	Qualification or relegation
1	Aberdeen (C)	36	19	10	7	68	36	+32	48	Qualification for the European Cup first round
2	Celtic	36	18	11	7	61	38	+23	47	Qualification for the Cup Winners' Cup first round
3	St Mirren	36	15	12	9	56	49	+7	42	Qualification for the UEFA Cup first round
4	Dundee United	36	12	13	11	43	30	+13	37	Qualification for the UEFA Cup first round
5	Rangers	36	15	7	14	50	46	+4	37	
6	Morton	36	14	8	14	51	46	+5	36	
7	Partick Thistle	36	11	14	11	43	47	−4	36	
8	Kilmarnock	36	11	11	14	36	52	−16	33	
9	Dundee (R)	36	10	6	20	47	73	−26	26	Relegation to the 1980–81 Scottish First Division
10	Hibernian (R)	36	6	6	24	29	67	−38	18	Relegation to the 1980–81 Scottish First Division

Source: Statto and RSSSF
Rules for classification: 1) points; 2) goal difference; 3) number of goals scored.
(C) Champions; (R) Relegated

Champions: Aberdeen
Relegated: Dundee, Hibernian

== Scottish League First Division ==
Pos	Team	Pld	W	D	L	GF	GA	GD	Pts	Promotion or relegation
1	Heart of Midlothian (C, P)	39	20	13	6	58	39	+19	53	Promotion to the Premier Division
2	Airdrieonians (P)	39	21	9	9	78	47	+31	51	Promotion to the Premier Division
3	Ayr United	39	16	12	11	64	51	+13	44	
4	Dumbarton	39	19	6	14	59	51	+8	44	
5	Raith Rovers	39	14	15	10	54	46	+8	43	
6	Motherwell	39	16	11	12	59	48	+11	43	
7	Hamilton Academical	39	15	10	14	60	59	+1	40	
8	Stirling Albion	39	13	13	13	40	40	0	39	
9	Clydebank	39	14	8	17	58	57	+1	36	
10	Dunfermline Athletic	39	11	13	15	39	57	−18	35	
11	St Johnstone	39	12	10	17	57	74	−17	34	
12	Berwick Rangers	39	8	15	16	57	64	−7	31	
13	Arbroath (R)	39	9	10	20	50	79	−29	28	Relegation to the Second Division
14	Clyde (R)	39	6	13	20	43	69	−26	25	Relegation to the Second Division

Source: RSSSF and statto
Rules for classification: 1) points; 2) goal difference; 3) number of goals scored.
(C) Champions; (P) Promoted; (R) Relegated

Promoted: Hearts, Airdrieonians
Relegated: Arbroath, Clyde

== Scottish League Second Division ==
Pos	Team	Pld	W	D	L	GF	GA	GD	Pts	Promotion
1	Falkirk (C, P)	39	19	12	8	65	35	+30	50	Promotion to the First Division
2	East Stirlingshire (P)	39	21	7	11	55	40	+15	49	Promotion to the First Division
3	Forfar Athletic	39	19	8	12	63	51	+12	46	
4	Albion Rovers	39	16	12	11	73	56	+17	44	
5	Queen's Park	39	16	9	14	59	47	+12	41	
6	Stenhousemuir	39	16	9	14	56	51	+5	41	
7	Brechin City	39	15	10	14	61	59	+2	40	
8	Cowdenbeath	39	14	12	13	54	52	+2	40	
9	Montrose	39	14	10	15	60	63	−3	38	
10	East Fife	39	12	9	18	45	57	−12	33	
11	Stranraer	39	12	8	19	51	65	−14	32	
12	Meadowbank Thistle	39	12	8	19	42	70	−28	32	
13	Queen of the South	39	11	9	19	51	69	−18	31	
14	Alloa Athletic	39	11	7	21	44	64	−20	29	

Source: "1979-1980 Second Division - SPFL Archive". SPFL.
Rules for classification: 1) points; 2) goal difference; 3) number of goals scored.
(C) Champions; (P) Promoted

Promoted: Falkirk, East Stirlingshire

== Cup honours ==
Competition	Winner	Score	Runner-up
Scottish Cup 1979–80	Celtic	1 – 0 (a.e.t.)	Rangers
League Cup 1979–80	Dundee United	3 – 0 (rep.)	Aberdeen
Junior Cup	Baillieston	2 – 0 (rep.)	Benburb

== Other honours ==
=== National ===
Competition	Winner	Score	Runner-up
Scottish Qualifying Cup – North	Inverness Thistle	5 – 0	Buckie Thistle
Scottish Qualifying Cup – South	Whitehill Welfare	8 – 1 *	Hawick Royal Albert

=== County ===
Competition	Winner	Score	Runner-up
Aberdeenshire Cup	Keith		
Ayrshire Cup	Ayr United	10 – 2 *	Girvan
East of Scotland Shield	Hibernian	2 – 2 ‡	Hearts
Fife Cup	Dunfermline Athletic	4 – 1 *	East Fife
Forfarshire Cup	Dundee United	2 – 1	Dundee
Lanarkshire Cup	Airdrie	3 – 2	Hamilton
Renfrewshire Cup	St Mirren	6 – 2 *	Morton
Stirlingshire Cup	Clydebank	4 – 1	Stenhousemuir

^{*} – aggregate over two legs
‡ – won on penalties

=== Highland League ===
Top Three
Pos	Team	Pld	W	D	L	GF	GA	GD	Pts
1	Keith	30	24	4	2	82	20	+62	52
2	Brora Rangers	30	15	10	5	60	27	+33	40
3	Inverness Thistle	30	17	4	9	74	43	+31	38

== Individual honours ==
Award	Winner	Club
Footballer of the Year	(Scotland) Gordon Strachan	Aberdeen
Players' Player of the Year	(Scotland) Davie Provan	Celtic
Young Player of the Year	(Scotland) John MacDonald	Rangers

== Scottish national team ==
Scotland finished fourth in the 1980 British Home Championship. Scotland won just one game, against Wales; Willie Miller scored Scotland's only goal of the tournament.

Date	Venue	Opponents	Score	Competition	Scotland scorer(s)
12 September 1979	Hampden Park, Glasgow (H)	Peru	1–1	Friendly	Jorge Olaechea (o.g.)
17 October 1979	Hampden Park, Glasgow (H)	Austria	1–1	ECQG2	Archie Gemmill
21 November 1979	Heysel Stadion, Brussels (A)	Belgium	0–2	ECQG2	
19 December 1979	Hampden Park, Glasgow (H)	Belgium	1–3	ECQG2	John Robertson
26 March 1980	Hampden Park, Glasgow (H)	Portugal	4–1	ECQG2	Kenny Dalglish, Andy Gray, Steve Archibald, Archie Gemmill
16 May 1980	Windsor Park, Belfast (A)	Northern Ireland	0–1	BHC	
21 May 1980	Hampden Park, Glasgow (H)	Wales	1–0	BHC	Willie Miller
24 May 1980	Hampden Park, Glasgow (H)	England	0–2	BHC	
28 May 1980	Warta Stadion, Poznań (A)	Poland	0–1	Friendly	
31 May 1980	Nepstadion, Budapest (A)	Hungary	1–3	Friendly	Steve Archibald

Key:

- (H) = Home match
- (A) = Away match
- ECQG2 = European Championship qualifying – Group 2
- BHC = British Home Championship

== See also ==
- 1979–80 Aberdeen F.C. season
