= Arne Larsen Økland =

Norwegian footballer and manager (born 1954)

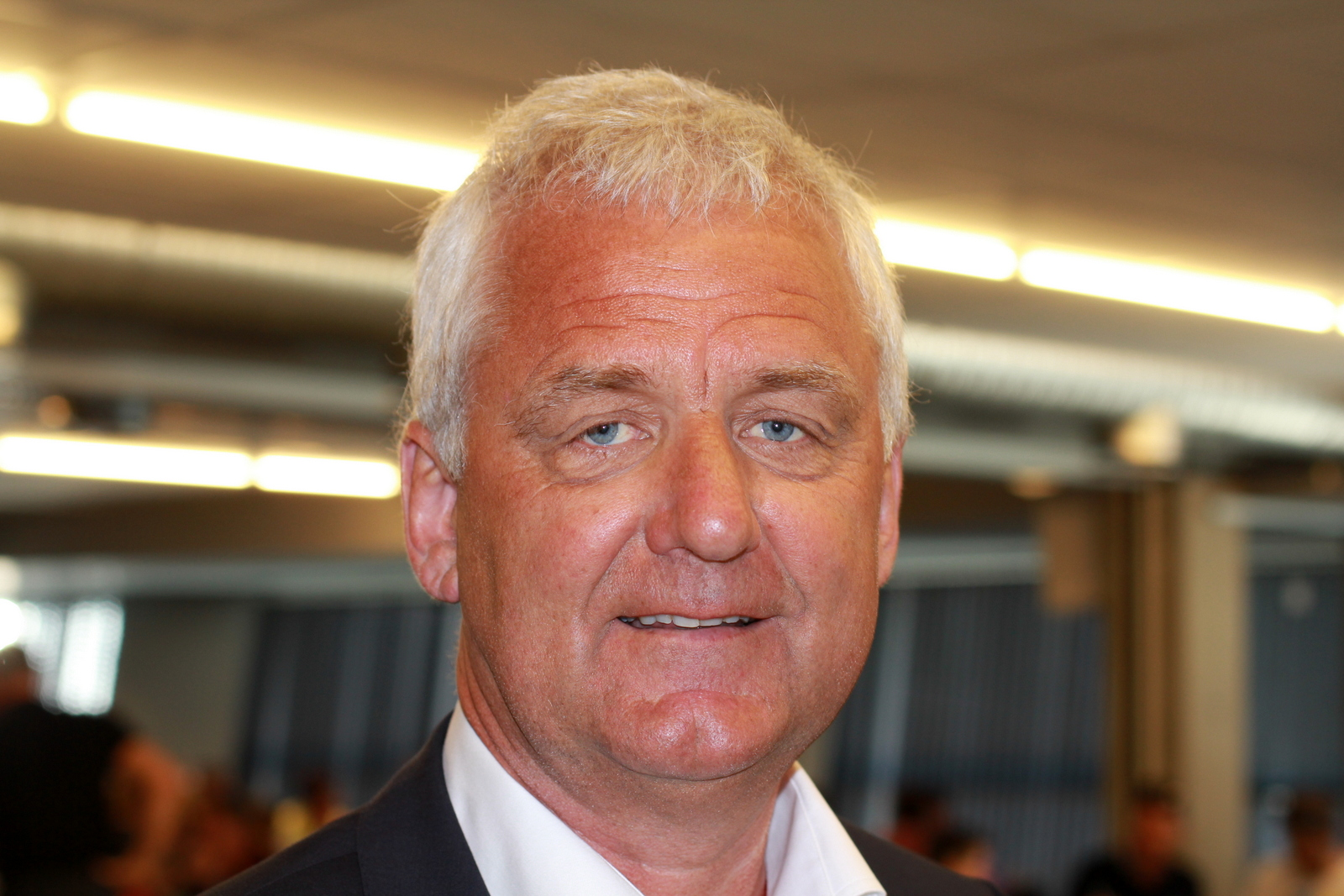
- Økland in 2014

Personal information
- Full name: Arne Larsen Økland
- Date of birth: 31 May 1954 (age 72)
- Place of birth: Bømlo Municipality, Norway
- Height: 1.81 m (5 ft 11 in)
- Position: Striker

Youth career
- Bremnes

Senior career*
Years	Team	Apps	(Gls)
1972–1976	Vard Haugesund	78	(37)
1977–1980	Bryne	76	(37)
1980–1983	Bayer Leverkusen	101	(43)
1983–1985	RC Paris	37	(16)
1985–1987	Bryne	47	(22)
Total		339	(155)

International career
1978–1987	Norway	54	(13)

Managerial career
- 1989–1990: Bryne
- 1992: Viking
- * Club domestic league appearances and goals

Arne Larsen Økland (born 31 May 1954) is a Norwegian former footballer who played as a striker for Vard Haugesund, Bryne, Bayer Leverkusen and RC Paris. He was capped 54 times for Norway, scoring 13 goals and he is regarded as one of the best Norwegian players of his generation. He later coached Bryne and Viking.

== Club career ==
Økland was born in Bømlo Municipality and began his career at the local club Bremnes before he moved to Vard Haugesund ahead of the 1972 season. In 1976 the club played their sole season in the Norwegian top division and Økland scored 11 goals, and made his international debut the same year. Despite Økland's efforts, Vard were relegated at the end of the season, and he then transferred to Bryne. With Økland as one of the key players, the newly promoted Bryne survived relegation in 1977, finished fourth in 1979 and second in 1980. In the summer of 1980, he was signed by West German side Bayer Leverkusen.

Økland enjoyed a successful three-year spell at Leverkusen. Just a few months into his stay at the club, he scored a hat-trick in a 3–0 win against Bayern Munich. Økland was in fact credited with a fourth goal late in the game as the ball went through a hole in the side netting, but Økland famously told the referee that it wasn't a goal. In his three years at Leverkusen, Økland played 101 Bundesliga matches and scored 43 goals. In 1983, Økland moved to the French team RC Paris, where he spent two seasons before returning to Bryne.

In his second spell at Bryne, Økland helped the club win the only major trophy in their history; the Norwegian Cup in 1987. After this victory, Økland retired.

== International career ==
Økland was one of the key players in Tor Røste Fossen's period as national team coach. He made his debut against Spain on 29 March 1978, which also was Røste Fossen first match in charge of Norway. His first international goals came in a 1–1 draw against Belgium, in a UEFA Euro 1980 qualifying match on 20 September 1978. He soon became an important player in both the national team, and the Olympic team. Norway qualified for the Moscow Olympics, but because of the boycott Økland and other teammates like Einar Aas and Vidar Davidsen never got to play in the olympics.

Økland was also a part of Norway's famous win against England in 1981, when Bjørge Lillelien commented his now famous "Your boys took a hell of a beating" tirade. Norway performed well in the start of the UEFA Euro 1984 qualifiers, and with Økland scoring in both matches, Norway won 3–1 against Yugoslavia and drew 2–2 away against Bulgaria, but with Tom Lund retiring from football, Norway once again failed to qualify for the finals.

In 1985, Økland scored the winning goal when Norway won 2–1 against reigning world champions Italy. Økland was also a part of the team that won 1–0 against future world champions Argentina in 1986. His last international appearance was in a friendly match against Italy on 28 May 1987, the same year as he retired. In total, Økland was capped 54 times, scoring 13 goals.

== Coaching career ==
He was later head coach of Bryne and Viking and was Norway's assistant coach during 1994 FIFA World Cup.

== Life outside football ==
Økland has later been CEO of Dolly Dimple's, a Norwegian pizza chain. He was the director of Viking, a Norwegian football club from Stavanger, between 2012 and 2015.

Økland is married to Liv Brit Økland, and they have three children; Ståle Økland, Silvia Ø. Greff and Martin Økland.
