= Bernd Förster =

German footballer

Personal information
- Full name: Bernhard Georg Josef Förster
- Date of birth: 3 May 1956 (age 70)
- Place of birth: Mosbach, West Germany
- Height: 1.83 m (6 ft 0 in)
- Positions: Defender; midfielder

Youth career
- –1974: Waldhof Mannheim

Senior career*
Years	Team	Apps	(Gls)
1974	Waldhof Mannheim	16	(0)
1974–1976	Bayern Munich	8	(0)
1976–1978	1. FC Saarbrücken	61	(5)
1978–1986	VfB Stuttgart	222	(20)
Total		307	(25)

International career
1973–1974	West Germany Youth	11	(0)
1974	West Germany Amateur	1	(0)
1979–1981	West Germany B	3	(0)
1979–1984	West Germany	33	(0)
Medal record
Representing West Germany
UEFA European Championship
Winner	1980 Italy
- * Club domestic league appearances and goals

Bernhard "Bernd" Georg Josef Förster (born 3 May 1956) is a former German footballer who played as a defender and midfielder.

His younger brother, Karlheinz, was also a footballer, and a defender. Both played extensively at VfB Stuttgart, and were crowned European champions in 1980.

== Club career ==
Förster started playing professionally at SV Waldhof Mannheim, in the second division. In January 1975, he switched to country giants FC Bayern Munich, but his stay there was highly unsuccessful (he did appear twice in the club's 1975–76 European Cup victorious campaign).

After establishing himself in the top flight with 1. FC Saarbrücken, Förster switched to VfB Stuttgart, after his former club relegated. He became an essential defensive member in the following seasons, partnering sibling Karlheinz in the back-four. Until his retirement, Förster scored 25 goals in 291 overall top-division league matches, being instrumental in Stuttgart's 1984 national league (31 matches, two goals). He retired in 1986, at only 30.

== International career ==
Förster won his first cap for West Germany on 22 May 1979, in a 3–1 friendly win in Republic of Ireland. In the following year's UEFA European Football Championship, he played twice as the nation was crowned continental champions, alongside brother Karlheinz.

At the 1982 FIFA World Cup, Förster only started playing in the second group stage, but from then on played the entire matches en route to the vice-championship. Hence, the pair became the first brothers in German football history to take part in a World Cup final since Ottmar and Fritz Walter's appearances in the victorious 1954 edition, and the first to be defeated.

Förster retired from international play after UEFA Euro 1984 in France, as Germany were ousted from the group stage after a last-minute goal by Spain's Antonio Maceda. He gained a total of 33 caps.

== Honours ==
=== Club ===
Bayern Munich

- European Cup: 1974–75, 1975–76
- Intercontinental Cup: 1976

VfB Stuttgart

- Bundesliga: 1983–84
- DFB-Pokal runner-up: 1985–86

=== International ===
West Germany

- UEFA European Championship: 1980
- FIFA World Cup runner-up: 1982
