= Peter Watson (footballer, born 1934) =

English footballer

Personal information
- Full name: Peter Frederick Watson
- Date of birth: 15 May 1934
- Place of birth: Stapleford, England
- Date of death: 17 August 2013 (aged 79)
- Place of death: Brighton, England
- Position: Centre half

Youth career
- 1947–1951: Nottingham Forest
- 1951–1955: Nottingham Forest

Senior career*
Years	Team	Apps	(Gls)
1955–1959	Nottingham Forest	13	(0)
1959–1966	Southend United	247	(3)
Total		260	(3)
- * Club domestic league appearances and goals

Peter Frederick Watson (15 April 1934 – 17 August 2013) was an English professional footballer who played as a centre half.

== Career ==
Born in Stapleford, Watson played for Stapleford Rovers, Nottingham Forest and Southend United. He later worked as a coach at Charlton Athletic and Cambridge United before becoming a decorator.

== Personal life ==
Watson was married with two sons. He had three sisters and four brothers, including England international footballer David.
