= Weserstadion =

Football stadium in the city of Bremen, Germany

Coordinates: 53°3′59″N 8°50′15″E

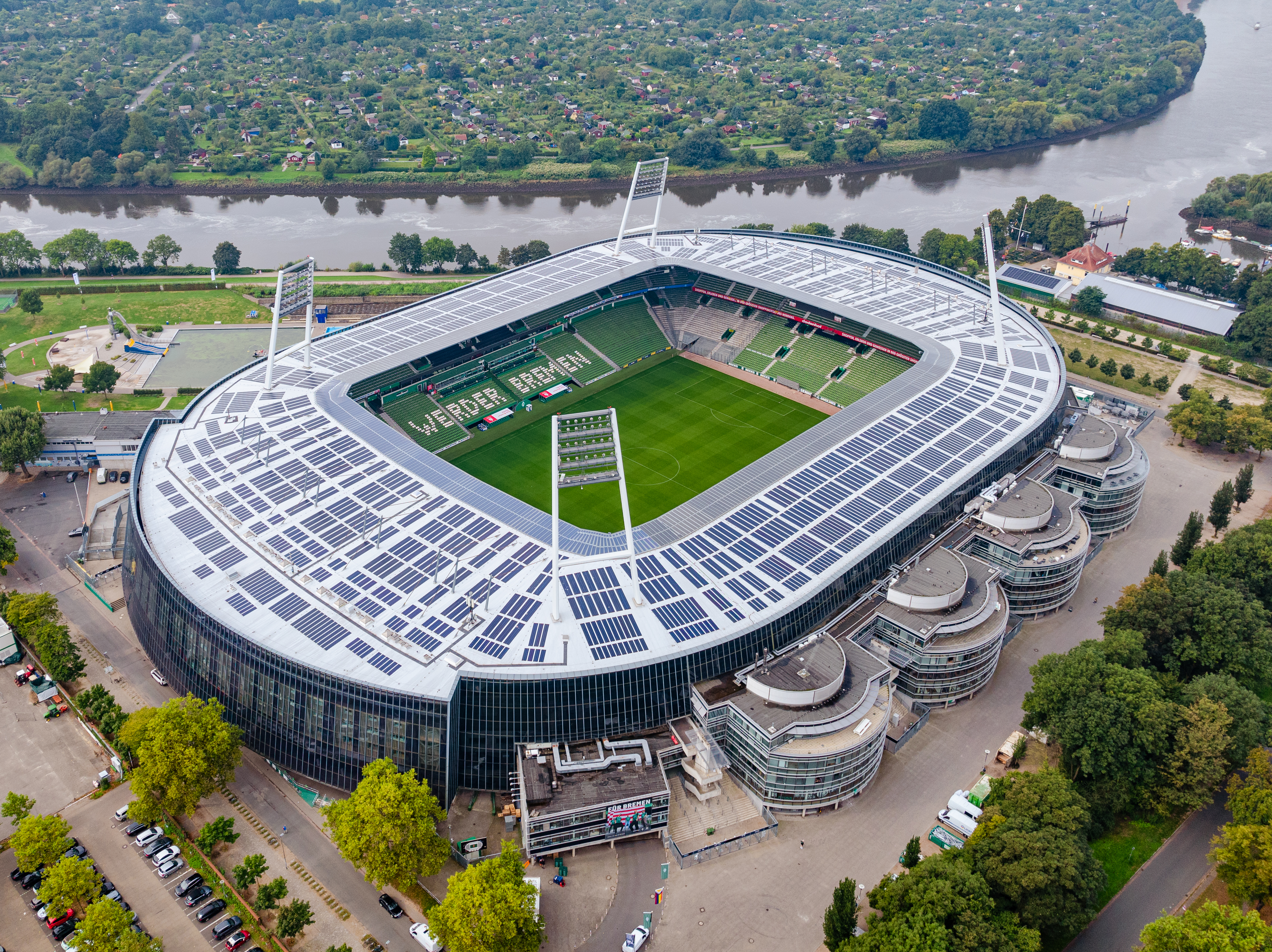
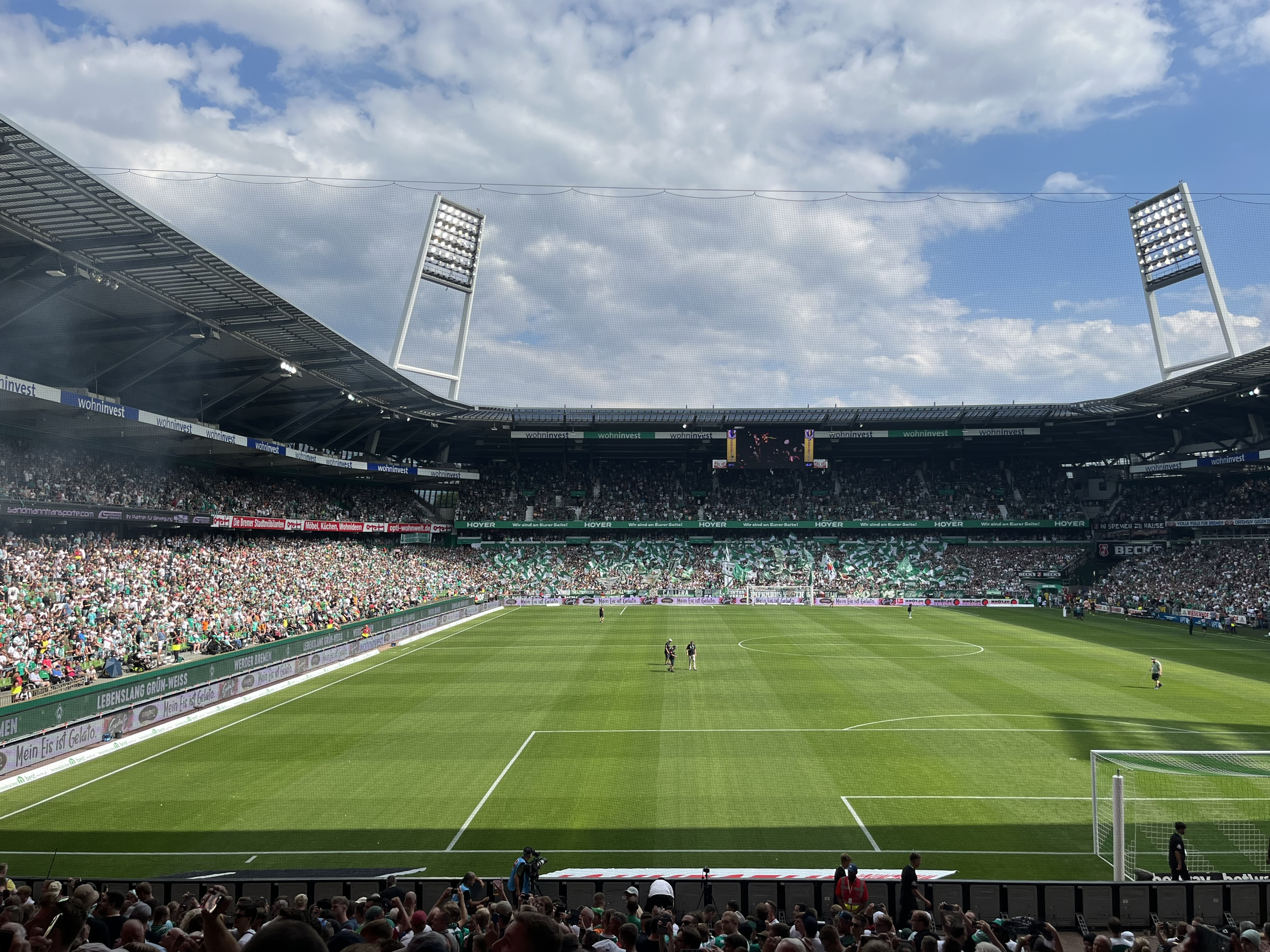
- Interactive map of Weserstadion
- Former names: Wohninvest Weserstadion (2019–2024)
- Location: Franz-Böhmert-Straße 1, Bremen, Germany
- Owner: Bremer Weser-Stadion GmbH
- Operator: Bremer Weser-Stadion GmbH
- Capacity: 42,100 (league matches), 37,441 (international matches)
- Executive suites: 79
- Surface: grass
- Field size: 105 × 68 m

Construction
- Opened: 1947
- Renovated: 1963–1965, 1989, 2005, 2008–2012
- Cost: €76.5 million (2008–2011)

Tenants
- Werder Bremen (1947–present); Germany national football team (selected matches)

Weserstadion (German pronunciation: [ˈveːzɐˌʃtaːdi̯ɔn]) is a football stadium in Bremen, Germany. The Weserstadion is scenically situated on the north bank of the Weser River and is surrounded by lush green parks (the name 'Werder' is a regional German word for "river peninsula"). The city center is only about 2.5 kilometres away. It is the home stadium of German Bundesliga club Werder Bremen.

Artists that have performed at the stadium include Bon Jovi, Michael Jackson, Tina Turner, Depeche Mode, Metallica, The Rolling Stones, Guns N' Roses and Van Halen, among others.

== History ==
The stadium originally included an athletics track, but that was partially removed in 2002 when the pitch was sunk by 2.1 metres (6 ft 11 in) and the stands at the straights were lengthened to the new pitch. With this the capacity rose with about 8,000 places. In 2004 four office towers were built behind the north stand. These towers offer a restaurant and offices for the club and local companies.

After various previous renovations, the stadium was expanded, completely rebuilt, and modernized from 2008 to 2011. The façade was coated with photovoltaic panels and a new roof was built on top of the old roof supporting structure (the old roof itself was torn down). Both ends (east and west) were torn down and rebuilt parallel to the endline of the pitch, removing what was left of the old athletics track. Since the rebuilding's completion at the start of the 2011/12 season, it has had a capacity of just over 42,000 seats for domestic matches and over 37,000 seats for international matches. The owner of the stadium is Bremer Weser-Stadion GmbH, which is owned half each by SV Werder Bremen and the city of Bremen.

== International football matches ==
Date	Home	Away	Result	Competition	Attendance
23 May 1939	Germany	Ireland	1–1 (1–0)	Friendly	35,000
27 February 1980	West Germany	Malta	8–0 (3–0)	UEFA Euro 1980 qualifying	38,000
4 June 1988	West Germany	Yugoslavia	1–1 (0–1)	Friendly	13,000
2 June 1992	Germany	Northern Ireland	1–1 (1–1)	Friendly	30,000
30 April 1997	Germany	Ukraine	2–0 (0–0)	1998 FIFA World Cup qualification	33,242
28 April 1999	Germany	Scotland	0–1 (0–0)	Friendly	27,000
29 May 2001	Germany	Slovakia	2–0 (0–0)	Friendly	18,000
30 April 2003	Germany	Serbia and Montenegro	1–0 (0–0)	Friendly	26,000
7 September 2005	Germany	South Africa	4–2 (1–1)	Friendly	28,100
29 February 2012	Germany	France	1–2 (0–1)	Friendly	37,800
12 June 2023	Germany	Ukraine	3–3 (1–2)	Friendly	35,975

A UEFA Euro 2016 qualifying match against Gibraltar was scheduled to be played at the stadium on 14 November 2014, but it was later moved to Frankenstadion in Nuremberg after a clash between German Football Association and the State of Bremen over the cost of police.

== Gallery ==
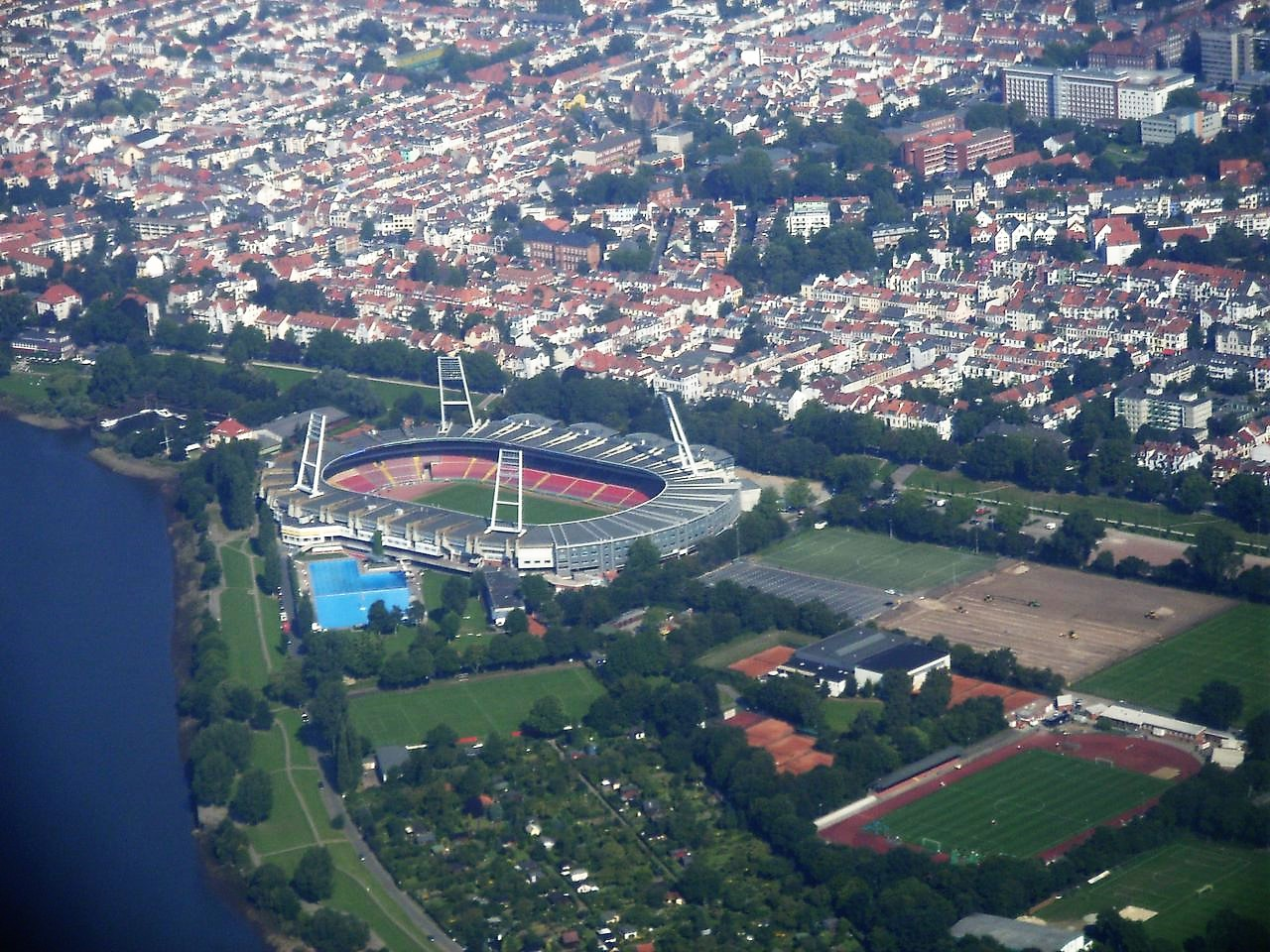
Aerial view of the stadium's old configuration with curved ends and red seats (2005)

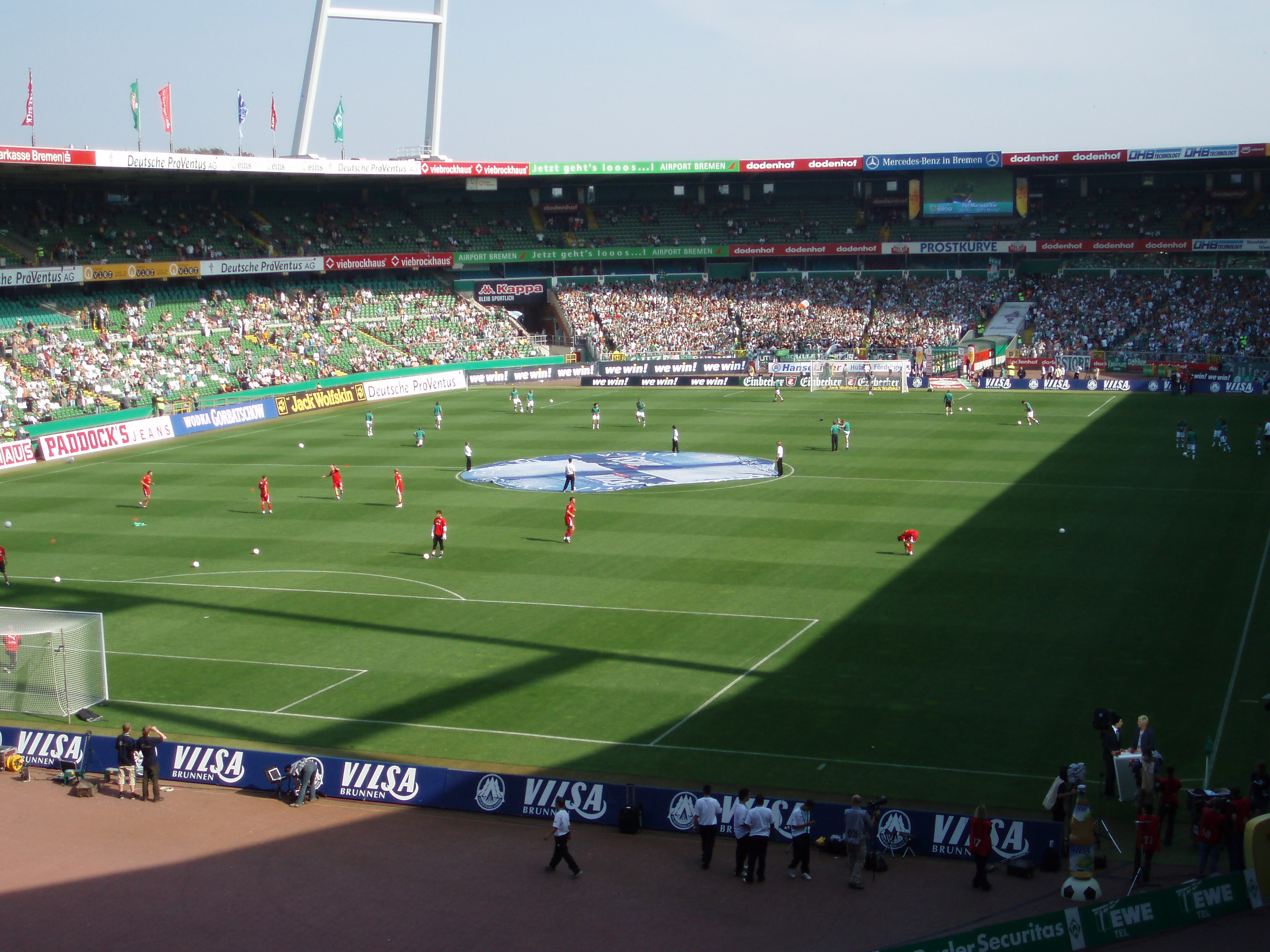
Interior of the stadium's old configuration with curved ends (2006)

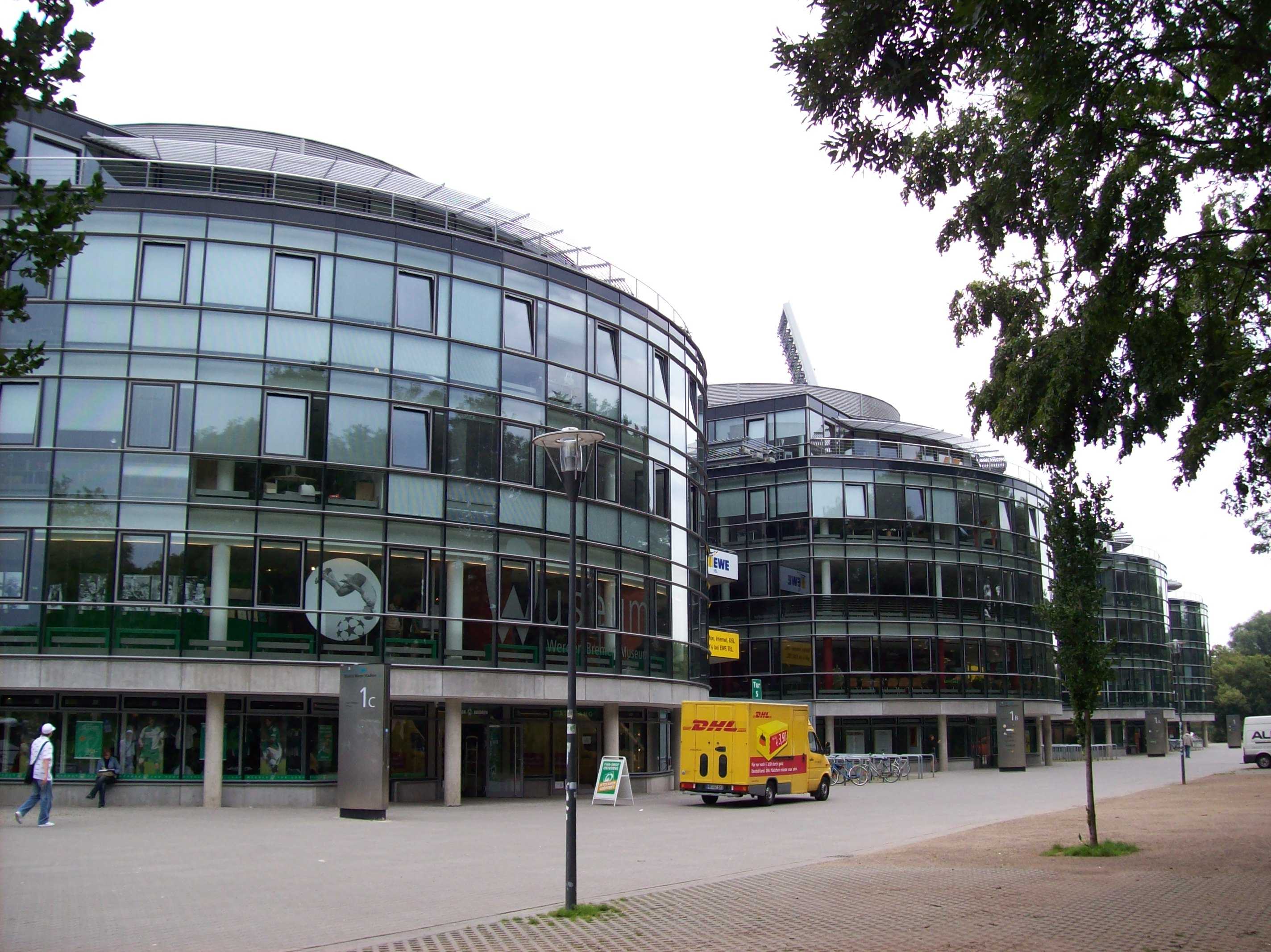
The north side of the stadium in 2007

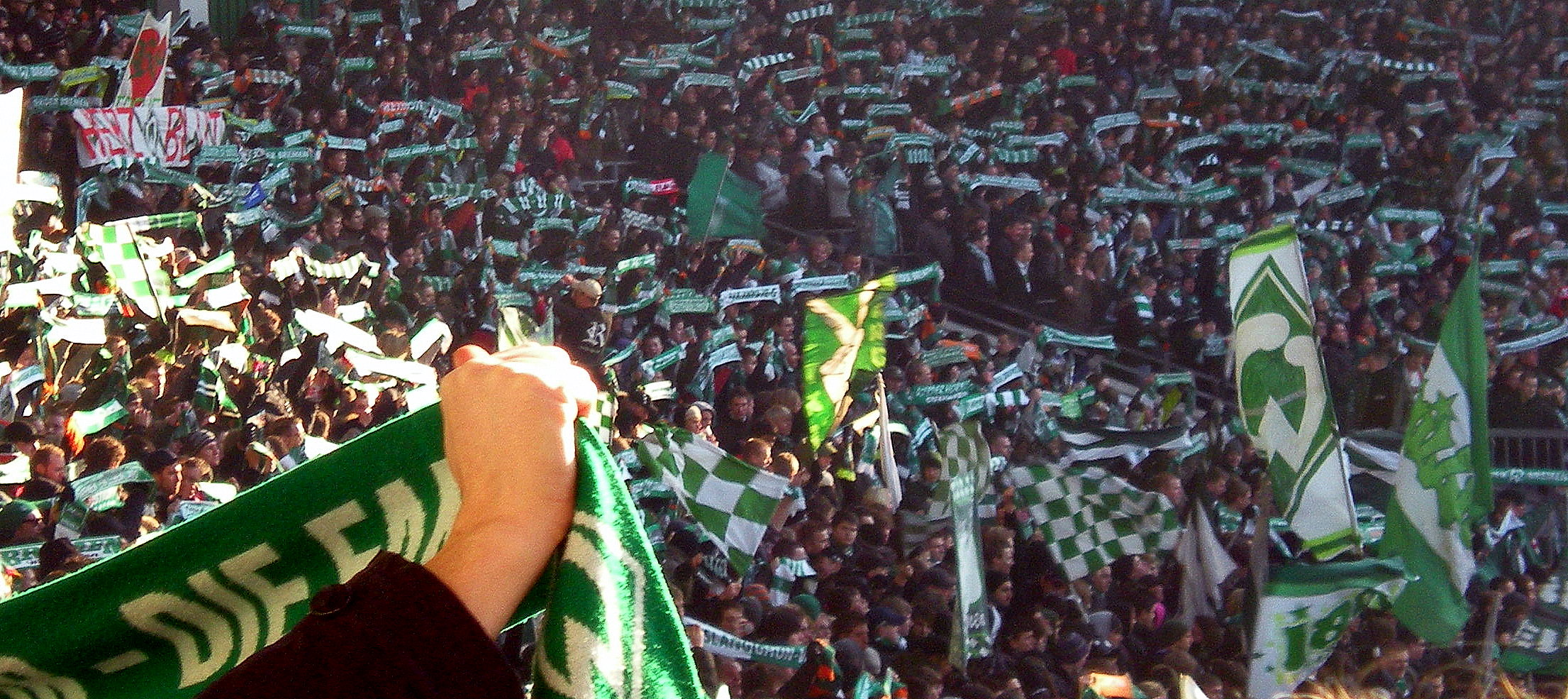
The Ostkurve in 2009

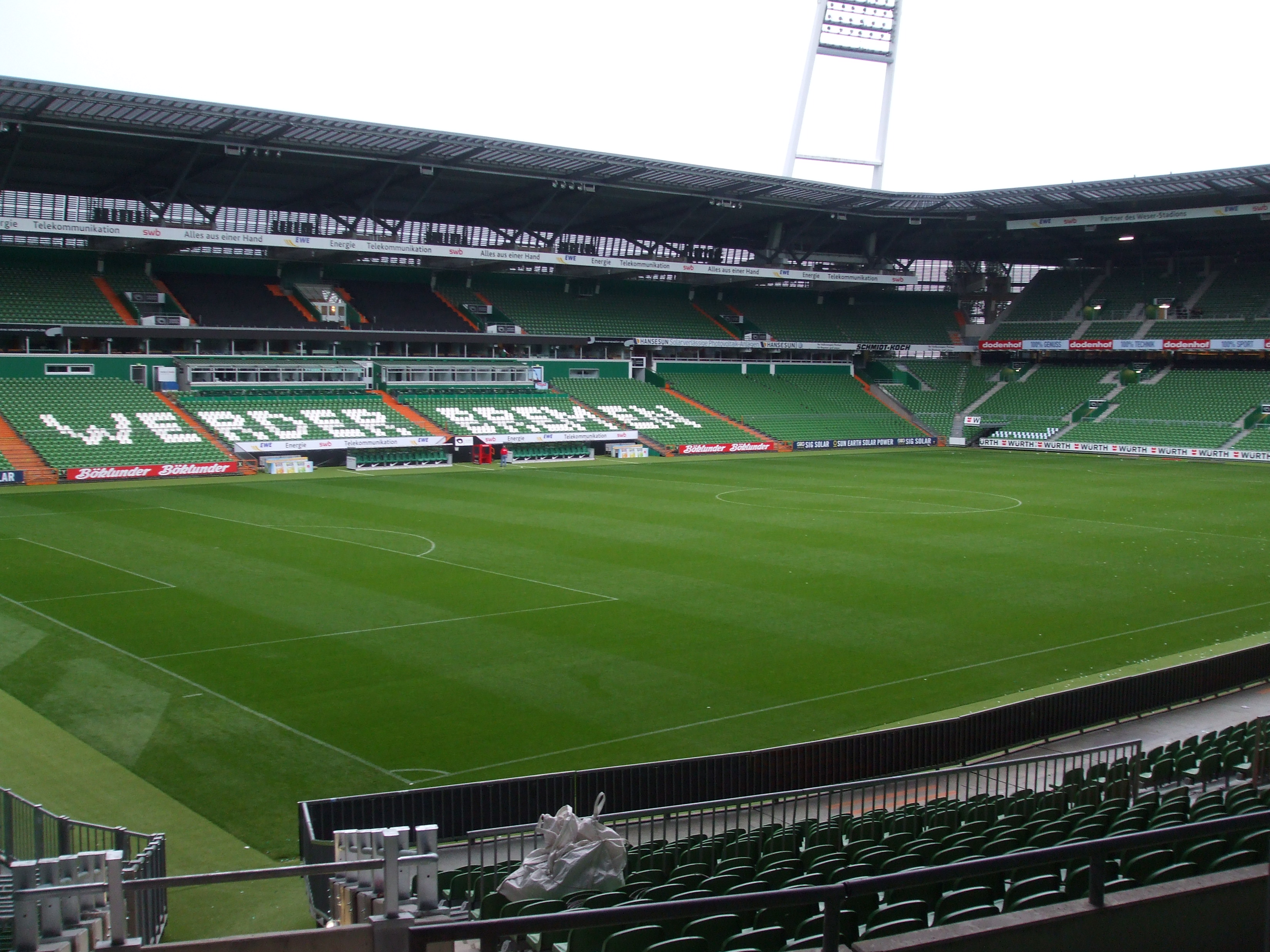
The new interior of the stadium in 2011

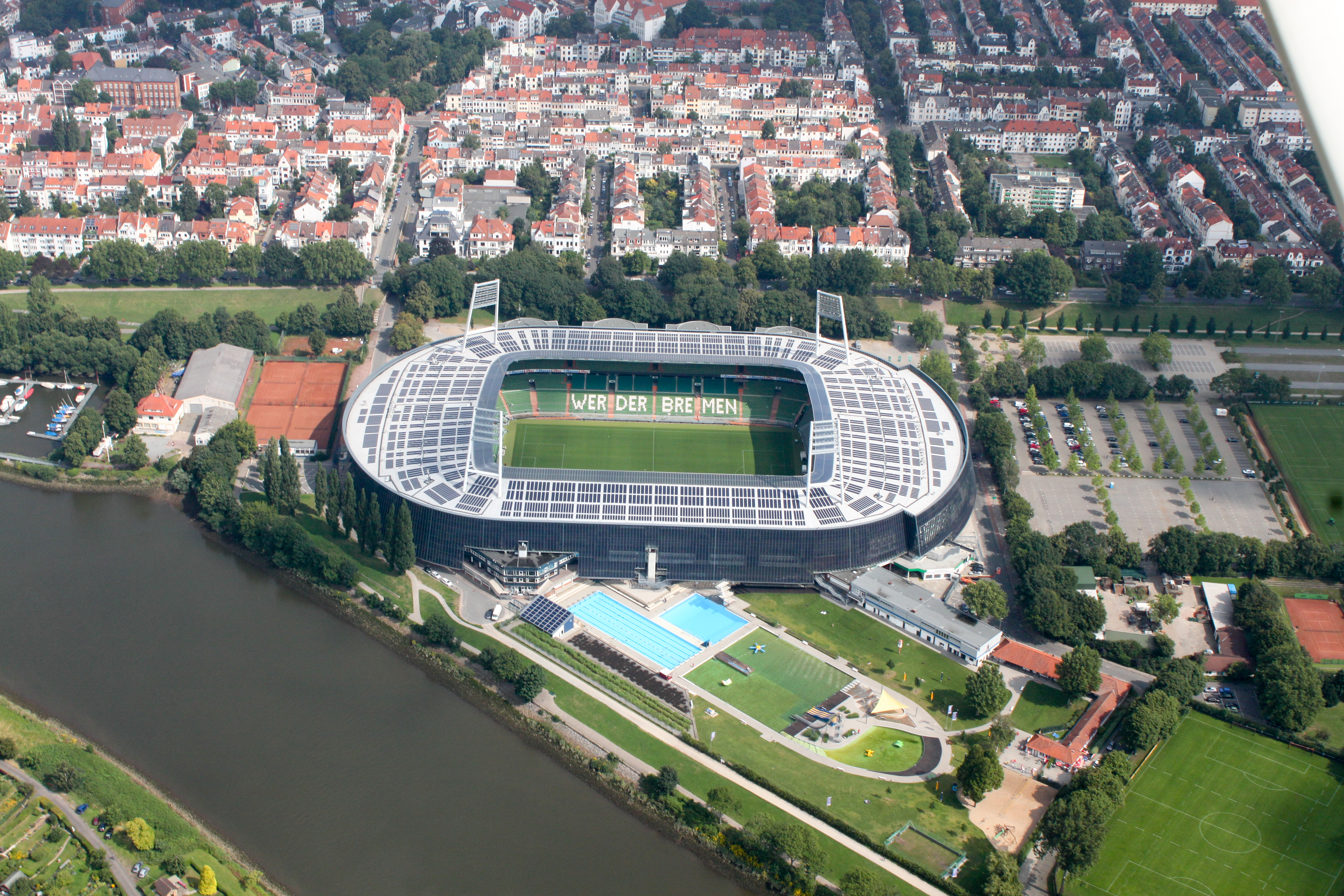
Weserstadion and surroundings in 2012

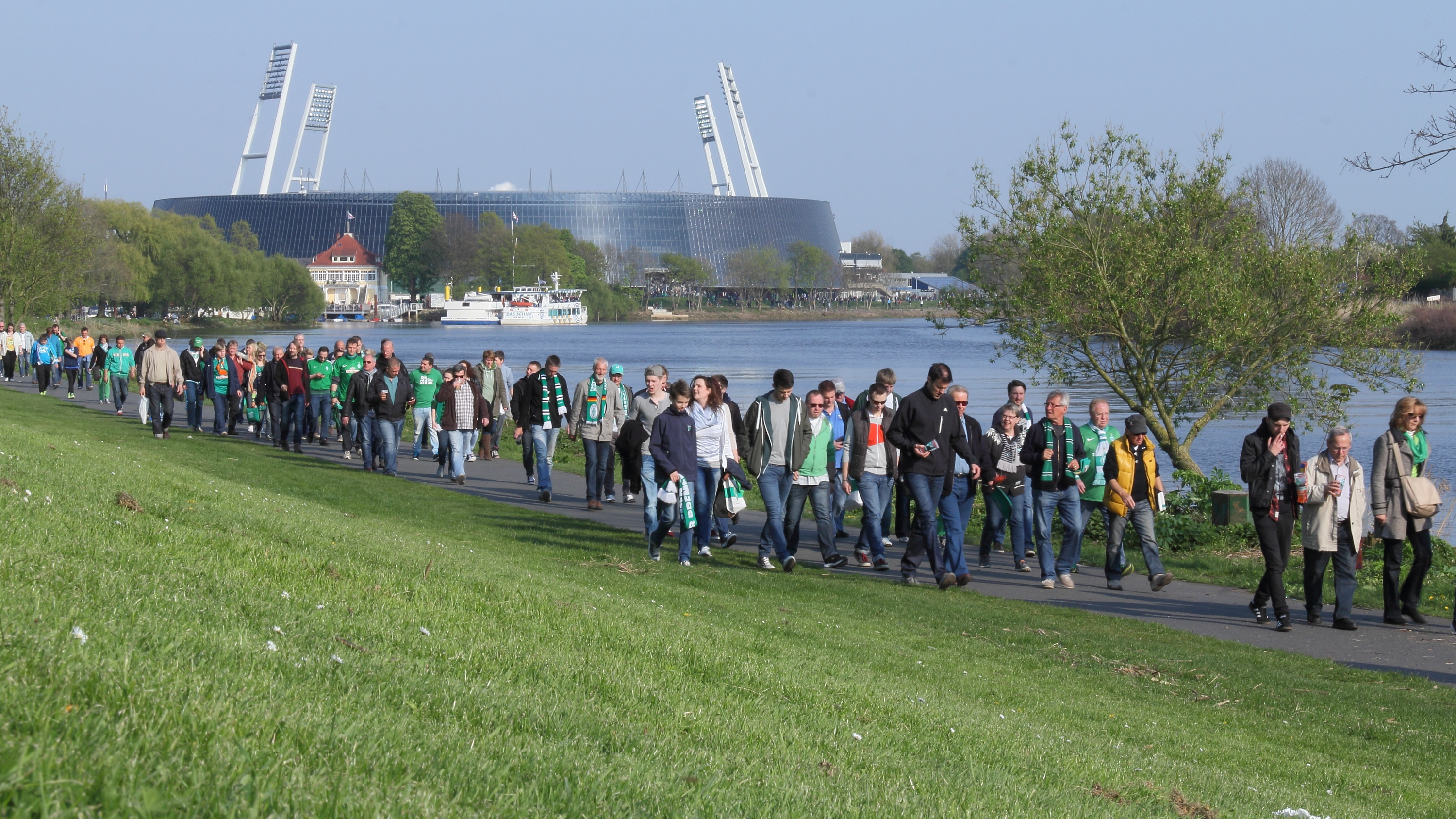
Weserstadion at matchday in 2014
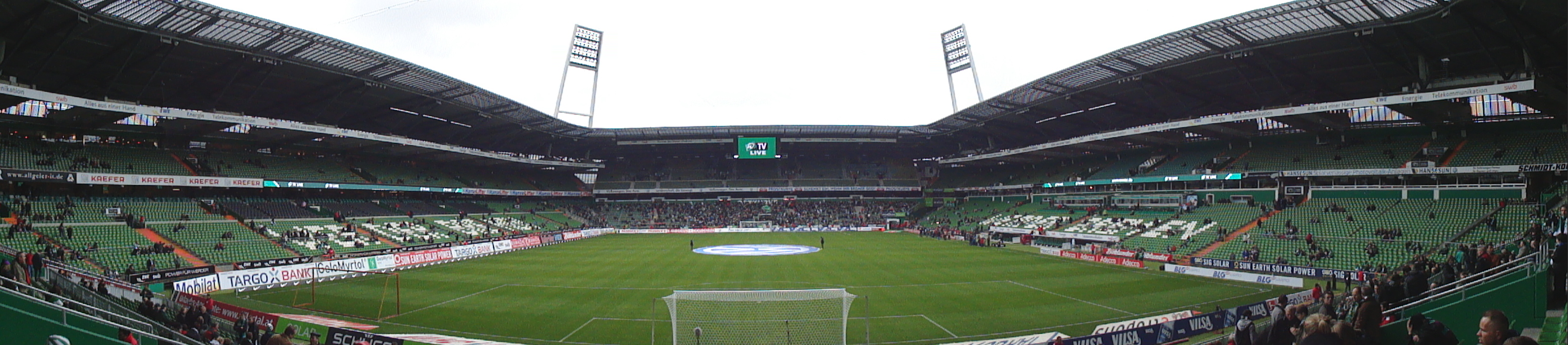
Weserstadion panorama
