= Karlheinz Förster =

German footballer

Personal information
- Full name: Karlheinz Helmut Förster
- Date of birth: 25 July 1958 (age 68)
- Place of birth: Mosbach, West Germany
- Height: 1.78 m (5 ft 10 in)
- Position: Centre-back

Youth career
- –1974: Badenia Unterschwarzach
- 1974–1975: Waldhof Mannheim
- 1975–1977: VfB Stuttgart

Senior career*
Years	Team	Apps	(Gls)
1977–1986	VfB Stuttgart	311	(22)
1986–1990	Marseille	103	(6)
1989–1990	Marseille B	3	(0)
1991–1992	Badenia Unterschwarzach		
Total		417	(28)

International career
1976–1978	West Germany Amateur	4	(0)
1978	West Germany B	2	(0)
1978–1986	West Germany	81	(2)
Medal record
Representing West Germany
FIFA World Cup
Runner-up	1982 Spain
Runner-up	1986 Mexico
UEFA European Championship
Winner	1980 Italy
- * Club domestic league appearances and goals

Karlheinz Helmut Förster (born 25 July 1958) is a German former professional footballer who played as a central defender.

The younger brother of another football defender, Bernd Förster, he was regarded as one of the world's top man-markers at his peak, and played most of his career at VfB Stuttgart with Bernd. Both were crowned European champions in 1980.

== Club career ==
Born in Mosbach, Förster started playing professionally at VfB Stuttgart, which would be his only club in the German first division. He was instrumental in the club's promotion in 1977, as he scored five times in 34 contests.

In the topflight, Förster rarely missed a game, partnering sibling Bernd in the backline. Both were instrumental in the club's 1983–84 league conquest and he left the club in 1986, having played in more than 300 overall official matches. He was then bought by France's Olympique de Marseille, for 3.5 million Deutsche Mark.

In his third year with L'OM, already partnered by countryman Klaus Allofs, Förster helped the side win the double. Having retired at nearly 32, he later became a player's agent.

== International career ==
Förster gained the first of his 81 caps for the West Germany national team in a friendly with Brazil, on 5 April 1978, not yet aged 20. From then onwards, he became an undisputed starter, appearing in all the matches at the victorious Euro 1980 (completely neutralizing Belgium's Jan Ceulemans in the final) and the runner-up place at the 1982 FIFA World Cup (also playing all the minutes).

At the latter competition, the pair of brothers (Bernd had already been an important figure in the continental win) became the first in German football history to take part in a World Cup final since Ottmar and Fritz Walter's appearances in the victorious 1954 edition, and the first to be defeated.

Förster still played for his nation at the UEFA Euro 1984 and 1986 World Cup, finishing second to Argentina in the latter. In Mexico '86, he took the role of man to man marker, neutralizing Mexico's Hugo Sánchez at the quarterfinals and Michel Platini of France at the semifinals.

== Career statistics ==
Scores and results list West Germany's goal tally first, score column indicates score after each Förster goal.

List of international goals scored by Karlheinz Förster
No.	Date	Venue	Opponent	Score	Result	Competition
1	17 October 1979	Müngersdorfer Stadion, Cologne, West Germany	Wales	5–0	5–1	UEFA Euro 1980 qualifying
2	16 December 1984	Ta' Qali National Stadium, Ta' Qali, Malta	Malta	1–1	3–2	1986 FIFA World Cup qualification

== Honours ==
VfB Stuttgart

- Bundesliga: 1983–84
- DFB-Pokal runner-up: 1985–86

Marseille

- Division 1: 1988–89, 1989–90
- Coupe de France: 1988–89; runner-up: 1986–87

West Germany

- UEFA European Championship: 1980
- FIFA World Cup runner-up: 1982, 1986

Individual

- kicker Bundesliga Team of the Season: 1977–78, 1983–84
- Onze Mondial: 1980, 1982, 1983, 1984, 1985, 1986
- UEFA European Championship Team of the Tournament: 1980, 1984
- Guerin Sportivo All-Star Team: 1982, 1983, 1984
- FIFA World Cup All-Star Team: 1986
- Footballer of the Year (Germany): 1982
