= Edwin Camilleri =

Maltese footballer

Personal information
- Date of birth: 8 January 1963 (age 63)
- Place of birth: Kalkara, Malta
- Position: Defender

Youth career
- Kalkara United

Senior career*
Years	Team	Apps	(Gls)
1983–1997	Hibernians	173	(5)
1997–1999	Ħamrun Spartans	37	(1)
Total		210	(6)

International career^{‡}
1985–1995	Malta	46	(0)
1987–1988	Malta XI	2	(0)

Managerial career
- 2006-2008: Malta U-19
- 2008-2011: Malta U-21
- * Club domestic league appearances and goals as of 29 June 2024 ‡ National team caps and goals as of 29 June 2024

Edwin Camilleri (born 8 January 1963) is a Maltese retired footballer, who represented the Malta national team.

== Club career ==
During his career, he played as a defender for Hibernians Paola and Ħamrun Spartans, making his debut for the former in December 1983 against Valletta and playing his final game for the latter in April 1999 against Rabat Ajax.

== International career ==
Nicknamed ix-Xafra, Camilleri made his debut for Malta in a November 1985 World Cup qualification match against Sweden and earned a total of 48 caps (including 2 unofficial), scoring no goals. His final international was a June 1995 European Championship qualification match away against Norway.

== Managerial career ==
Camilleri was named coach of the Malta national under-21 football team in October 2008, stepping up from the U-19s.

== Honours ==
- Maltese Premier League: 4

1994, 1995
