= 1978–79 British Home Championship =

Tournament details
- Dates: 19–26 May 1979
- Teams: 4

Final positions
- Champions: England (52nd title)
- Runners-up: Wales

Tournament statistics
- Matches played: 6
- Goals scored: 12 (2 per match)
- Top scorer: (Wales) John Toshack (3)

The 1978–79 British Home Championship was a British Home Nations competition, won by the English football side and notable for seeing marked increases in hooliganism and falling attendance which would result in its cancellation in 1984. The English started well, beating Northern Ireland to match the heavy Welsh victory over Scotland on the same day, which featured a hat trick by John Toshack. Scotland recovered by beating the Irish in their next match while England and Wales played out a goalless draw, leaving three sides theoretically capable of winning the Championship in the final round. Wales could only manage a draw with the Irish and so in the deciding match between England and Scotland, a 1–1 half time score gave the Scots some hope but a strong second half performance from England was rewarded with a deserved 3–1 win. This result gave England the Championship, with Wales in second place. The tournament also saw the introduction of goal difference to separate teams, although it had no effect on the eventual outcome.

== Table ==
| Team | Pld | W | D | L | GF | GA | GD | Pts |
|---|---|---|---|---|---|---|---|---|
| England (C) | 3 | 2 | 1 | 0 | 5 | 1 | +4 | 5 |
| Wales | 3 | 1 | 2 | 0 | 4 | 1 | +3 | 4 |
| Scotland | 3 | 1 | 0 | 2 | 2 | 6 | −4 | 2 |
| Northern Ireland | 3 | 0 | 1 | 2 | 1 | 4 | −3 | 1 |

Rules for classification: 1) points 2) goal difference. The points system worked as follows: 2 points for a win and 1 point for a draw.
Note: For the first time, goal difference was used to divide the teams, although it made no difference to the final outcome at this tournament.
(C) Champions

== Results ==
19 May 1979

| Wales | 3–0 | Scotland |
|---|---|---|
| Toshack 28', 35', 75' | Report |

Ninian Park, Cardiff
Referee: Pat Partridge (England)

19 May 1979

| Northern Ireland | 0–2 | England |
|---|---|---|
| | Report | Watson 11'; Coppell 14' |

Windsor Park, Belfast
Referee: Ian Foote (Scotland)

22 May 1979

| Scotland | 1–0 | Northern Ireland |
|---|---|---|
| Graham 76' | Report |

Hampden Park, Glasgow
Referee: Clive Thomas (Wales)

23 May 1979

| England | 0–0 | Wales |
|---|---|---|
| | Report |

Wembley Stadium, London
Referee: Malcolm Moffatt (Northern Ireland)

25 May 1979

| Northern Ireland | 1–1 | Wales |
|---|---|---|
| Spence 40' | Report | James 63' |

Windsor Park, Belfast
Referee: John Homewood (England)

26 May 1979

| England | 3–1 | Scotland |
|---|---|---|
| Barnes 45'; Coppell 63'; Keegan 70' | Report | Wark 21' |

Wembley Stadium, London
Referee: António Garrido (Portugal)
