= Emanuel Farrugia =

Maltese footballer

Personal information
- Date of birth: 2 October 1957 (age 69)
- Place of birth: Żabbar, Malta
- Position: Defender

Senior career*
| Years | Team | Apps | (Gls) |
| 1977–1985 | Valletta | | |
| 1987–1989 | Sliema Wanderers | | |

International career^{‡}
| 1977–1985 | Malta | 29 | (1) |
| 1978–1984 | Malta XI | 3 | (0) |
- * Club domestic league appearances and goals as of 29 June 2024 ‡ National team caps and goals as of 29 June 2024

Emanuel Farrugia also known as Leli Farrugia, (born 2 October 1957) is a retired footballer, who represented the Malta national team.

== Club career ==
During his career, he played as a defender for Valletta and Sliema Wanderers.

== International career ==
Nicknamed Snickers, Farrugia made his debut for Malta in a September 1977 friendly match away against Tunisia and earned a total of 32 caps (including 3 unofficial), scoring 1 goal. His final international was a March 1985 World Cup qualification match away against West Germany.

== Personal life ==
Farrugia and his son Jean Paul were the first father-and-son pair to score for the national team after Jean Paul scored against Slovakia in 2017. Farrugia has worked for the Malta Football Association and was assistant to Edwin Camilleri at the Malta national under-21 football team and to Branko Nišević at the U-19's.
