= Ivan Iliev (footballer) =

Bulgarian footballer

Personal information
- Full name: Ivan Gospodinov Iliev
- Date of birth: 16 November 1955 (age 70)
- Place of birth: General Toshevo, Bulgaria
- Position: Defender

Senior career*
Years	Team	Apps	(Gls)
1974–1985	Slavia Sofia	247	(18)
1985–1987	Dimitrovgrad	?	(?)

International career
1978	Bulgaria U21	1	(0)
1977–1982	Bulgaria	21	(1)
- * Club domestic league appearances and goals

Ivan Gospodinov Iliev (Bulgarian: Иван Господинов Илиев; born 16 November 1955) is a Bulgarian former footballer who played as a defender and made 21 appearances for the Bulgaria national team.

== Career ==
Iliev made his debut for Bulgaria on 21 September 1977 in a 1977–80 Balkan Cup match against Turkey, which finished as a 3–1 win. He went on to make 21 appearances, scoring 1 goal, before making his last appearance on 7 September 1982 in a friendly match against Switzerland, which finished as a 2–3 loss.

== Career statistics ==
=== International ===
Bulgaria
Year	Apps	Goals
1977	1	0
1978	6	1
1979	7	0
1980	1	0
1981	3	0
1982	3	0
Total	21	1

=== International goals ===
No.	Date	Venue	Opponent	Score	Result	Competition
1	11 October 1978	Parken Stadium, Copenhagen, Denmark	Denmark	2–2	2–2	UEFA Euro 1980 qualifying
