= Gerry Armstrong (footballer) =

Northern Irish footballer

Personal information
- Full name: Gerard Joseph Armstrong
- Date of birth: 23 May 1954 (age 72)
- Place of birth: Belfast, Northern Ireland
- Height: 5 ft 11 in (1.80 m)
- Position: Striker

Senior career*
Years	Team	Apps	(Gls)
1970–1971	St Paul's Swifts		
1971–1972	Cromac Albion		
1972–1975	Bangor		
1975–1980	Tottenham Hotspur	84	(10)
1980–1983	Watford	76	(12)
1983–1985	Real Mallorca	55	(13)
1985–1986	West Bromwich Albion	8	(1)
1986	Chesterfield	12	(1)
1986–1989	Brighton & Hove Albion	47	(6)
1987	→ Millwall (loan)	7	(0)
1989–1990	Crawley Town	25	(6)
1990	Glenavon	7	(2)
1990–1991	Bromley		
1991–1995	Worthing		
1997–1998	Whitehawk	2	(0)

International career
1977–1986	Northern Ireland	63	(12)

Managerial career
- 1991–1995: Worthing
- 1994–1996: Northern Ireland (assistant)
- 2004–2006: Northern Ireland (assistant)
- * Club domestic league appearances and goals

Gerard Joseph Armstrong (born 23 May 1954) is a Northern Irish former footballer who played for Tottenham Hotspur.

He spent the majority of his career in England, as well as having a spell in Spain. He represented the Northern Ireland national football team and won acclaim at the 1982 FIFA World Cup, where he was the highest scoring player from the UK; this included a shock winner against hosts Spain. He works as a football analyst.

== Playing career ==
=== Domestic career ===
Armstrong, who supported English club Leeds United as a boy, began his career in Northern Ireland with St Paul's Swifts. He only started to play football as a teenager when serving a ban from Gaelic football, and feels that his late start in the game was a significant disadvantage.

He subsequently moved on to play for Cromac Albion and Bangor.

In November 1975, Armstrong moved to England, signing with Tottenham Hotspur for a fee of £25,000. He made his Spurs debut in a 3–1 defeat at Ipswich Town on 21 August 1976, aged 22. He made a total of 84 league appearances for Spurs, scoring 10 goals.

In November 1980 he was signed by Second Division side Watford for £250,000. Watford were promoted to the First Division in the 1981–82 season, and Armstrong scored the club's first ever goal in the top flight.

I did get stick, particularly when we went to play Valencia, obviously the home fans remembered only too well what I had done to them the year previous, but I was pleased to say we drew 2–2 with Valencia and I scored a goal into the very same net that I'd scored for Northern Ireland.

– Gerry Armstrong, reflecting on his time playing for Real Mallorca after his performances in the 1982 World Cup.

— BBC Sport Northern Ireland, 16 January 2005.

After recovering from a long time out with a broken leg, he moved to Spain in August 1983 with RCD Mallorca for £200,000. Following the goal he scored against Spain in the 1982 World Cup, he was the subject of abuse from opposition fans.

Armstrong returned to England in August 1985, signing for West Bromwich Albion on a free transfer. In January 1986 he was loaned to Chesterfield, whom he joined permanently in March 1986 until the end of the season. On his debut, Armstrong scored for the Spireites in a 3–1 home defeat to Brentford. He signed for Brighton & Hove Albion on a free transfer in August 1986. In January 1987, he was loaned to Millwall where he was offered a player-coach role.

Brighton instead recalled him into that same position, but the following year Armstrong left the club after an altercation with a fan at a reserve team match. In February 1989, he took up the same position at Crawley Town, before leaving in March 1990 after another confrontation with a fan. He joined Glenavon as a player the same month, and by April 1990 he was also playing midweek games for Bromley.

He then had a four-year spell as manager of Isthmian League side Worthing, combining that with being assistant manager to Bryan Hamilton with Northern Ireland, including scoring the goals to get them to the FA Cup First Round proper, where they lost against Bournemouth.

Armstrong last played competitive football for Brighton-based non-league side Whitehawk in 1997–98, making a scoring debut on 9 December 1997 in 3-1 Sussex County League Cup defeat at Burgess Hill Town. He played twice more in the league for Whitehawk that season.

=== International career ===
In April 1977 Armstrong made his debut for the Northern Ireland national team. He played alongside George Best in a 5–0 friendly defeat to West Germany.

Five years later, Armstrong was selected for the Northern Ireland squad for the 1982 FIFA World Cup in Spain. After a 0–0 draw in their opening match against Yugoslavia, Armstrong scored the opening goal in the 1–1 draw against Honduras. With Northern Ireland requiring a win to progress to the next stage, Armstrong scored a 47th-minute goal against hosts Spain in Valencia. Northern Ireland even had Mal Donaghy sent off, but held on to win 1–0.

In the next stage, also a group round, Northern Ireland drew 2–2 with Austria, with Armstrong scoring in the subsequent 4–1 loss to France.

Armstrong made a total of six appearances for Northern Ireland in the World Cup and his 12 goals made him Northern Ireland's leading scorer at the time.

=== International goals ===
Scores and results list Northern Ireland's goal tally first.

#	Date	Venue	Opponent	Score	Result	Competition
1	16 November 1977	Belfast, Northern Ireland	Belgium	1-0	3-0	1978 FIFA World Cup qualification
2	16 November 1977	Belfast, Northern Ireland	Belgium	3-0	3-0	1978 FIFA World Cup qualification
3	29 November 1978	Sofia, Bulgaria	Bulgaria	1-0	2-0	UEFA Euro 1980 qualifying
4	2 May 1979	Belfast, Northern Ireland	Bulgaria	2-0	2-0	UEFA Euro 1980 qualifying
5	21 November 1979	Belfast, Northern Ireland	Republic of Ireland	1-0	1-0	UEFA Euro 1980 qualifying
6	29 April 1981	Belfast, Northern Ireland	Portugal	1-0	1-0	1982 FIFA World Cup qualification
7	18 November 1981	Belfast, Northern Ireland	Israel	1-0	1-0	1982 FIFA World Cup qualification
8	21 June 1982	Zaragoza, Spain	Honduras	1-0	1-1	1982 FIFA World Cup
9	25 June 1982	Valencia, Spain	Spain	1-0	1-0	1982 FIFA World Cup
10	4 July 1982	Madrid, Spain	France	1-3	1-4	1982 FIFA World Cup
11	22 May 1984	Swansea, Wales	Wales	1-1	1-1	1984 British Home Championship
12	14 November 1984	Belfast, Northern Ireland	Finland	2-1	2-1	1986 FIFA World Cup qualification

== Coaching ==
In November 1991, Armstrong was appointed manager of non-league club Worthing, leading them to promotion in 1993 and their first ever appearance in the FA Cup 1st round proper. He remains a Lifetime Vice President of the Southern League club. In 1994, he became assistant manager of the Northern Ireland national team, under his former national teammate Bryan Hamilton. In 1995, he left Worthing, and in March 1996 he was appointed a Sussex FA youth coach.

In 2004, he reprised his role as Northern Ireland assistant manager under Lawrie Sanchez. He left the position in August 2006 to concentrate on other commitments, as it was revealed that he and his wife Debby were expecting a child.

== Football media ==
Armstrong had combined his coaching positions with employment in football journalism - in television, in radio and in print. He spent 20 years as a co-commentator for Sky Sports' coverage of La Liga Champions League & International football, and also works as an analyst for the Premier League coverage of ESPN Star Sports.

An outspoken critic of the amount of diving in the modern game, Armstrong worked on talkSPORT radio presenting their show that looked at European Football on Monday night with Gab Marcotti and occasionally pops up as a guest.

Armstrong has appeared on Singaporean media as an analyst on SingTel mio TV's 2014 World Cup coverage which was mirrored on The Straits Times.

As of 2023 he co-commentates for Virgin Media TV in Ireland.

== Personal life ==
Armstrong is three-times married with 5 children total. Originally from the Falls Road in Belfast, he grew up in the times of the Troubles in Northern Ireland and was one of 9 children.

== Playing honours ==
Northern Ireland

- British Home Championship winners: 1980, 1984
