= Georg Hammer =

Norwegian footballer (born 1950)

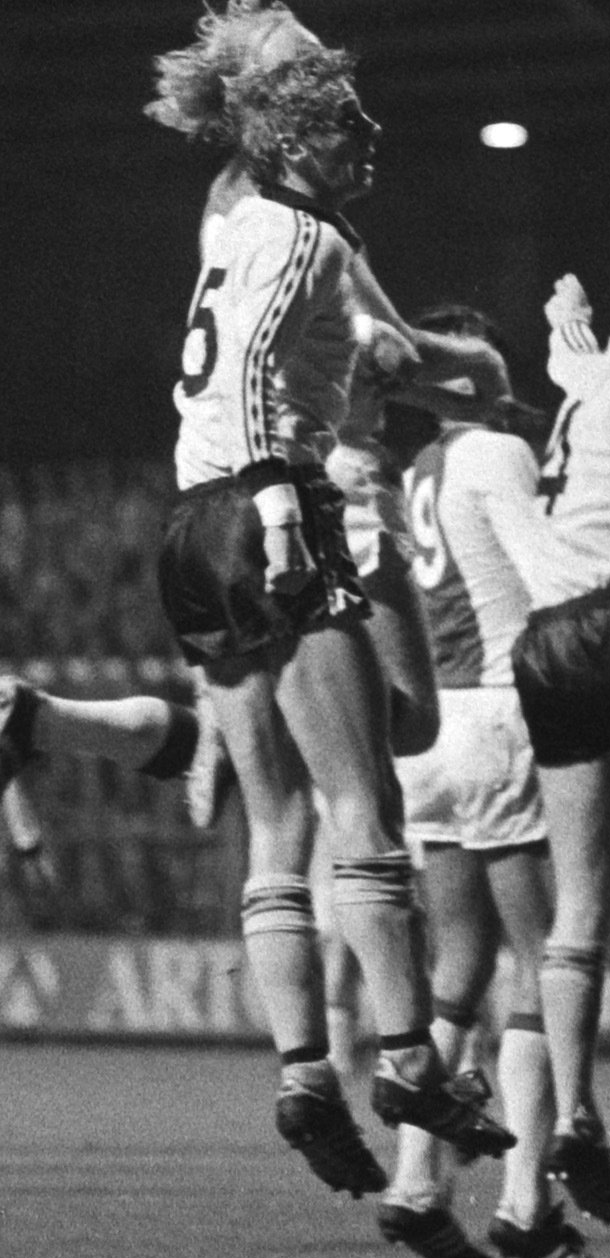
- Georg Hammer with Lillestrøm in 1977

Personal information
- Date of birth: 11 December 1950 (age 75)
- Place of birth: Kristiansund, Norway

International career
Years	Team	Apps	(Gls)
1979	Norway	7	(3)

Georg Hammer (born 11 December 1950) is a Norwegian footballer. He played in seven matches for the Norway national football team in 1979.
