= Alojzy Jarguz =

Polish football referee (1934–2019)

- Born: March 19, 1934; Rogoźno, Poland
- Died: April 22, 2019 (aged 85); Olsztyn, Poland

Domestic
Years	League	Role
1958–1973	Ekstraklasa, Polish Cup, I liga, UAE Football League	Referee

International
Years	League	Role
1976–1983	FIFA listed	Referee

Alojzy Jarguz (born 19 March 1934 – 22 April 2019) was a Polish football referee.

== Life and career ==
Jarguz played football before becoming a football referee. He refereed his first match in 1958. Jarguz refereed at the 1978 FIFA World Cup. He became the first Polish referee to referee at a FIFA World Cup. He has been described as "considered the best referee in the history of Polish football by many experts, journalists and fans". He refereed in the Polish top flight, UEFA Cup Winners' Cup, UEFA Cup, European Cup, and FIFA U-20 World Cup. After that, he refereed in the Emirati football league. He retired from professional refereeing in 1984. After retiring from professional refereeing, he worked for the Polish Football Association.

Jarguz was born on 19 March 1934 in Poland. He died on 22 April 2019 in Poland. He was a native of Rogoźno, Poland. He was nicknamed "Alek". He played volleyball as a child. He served in the Polish military. He was promoted to the rank of corporal while serving in the Polish military. Jarguz had two children. He was married.
