= Peter O'Sullivan (Welsh footballer) =

Welsh footballer

Personal information
- Full name: Peter Anthony O'Sullivan
- Date of birth: 4 March 1951 (age 75)
- Place of birth: Colwyn Bay, Wales
- Height: 1.73 m (5 ft 8 in)
- Position: Winger

Senior career*
Years	Team	Apps	(Gls)
1968–1970	Manchester United	0	(0)
1970–1981	Brighton & Hove Albion	435	(39)
1980	→ San Diego Sockers (loan)	21	(2)
1981–1983	Fulham	46	(1)
1982–1983	→ Charlton Athletic (loan)	5	(0)
1982–1983	→ Reading (loan)	9	(0)
1983	Seiko SA		
1983–1984	Aldershot	14	(0)
1984–1985	Crawley Town		
- Maidstone United
Total		530	(42)

International career
1973–1978	Wales	3	(1)
- * Club domestic league appearances and goals

Peter O'Sullivan (born 4 March 1951) is a Welsh former footballer who played at both professional and international levels as a winger, making over 500 career appearances.

== Career ==
Born in Colwyn Bay, O'Sullivan played in England, the United States and Hong Kong for Manchester United, Brighton & Hove Albion, the San Diego Sockers, Fulham, Charlton Athletic, Reading, Seiko SA, Aldershot, Crawley Town and Maidstone United.

O'Sullivan earned three caps for the Welsh national team between 1973 and 1978.

== After football ==
As of May 2008, O'Sullivan was working for a Brighton plant-hire company.
