= John Holland (footballer) =

Maltese footballer

Personal information
- Full name: John Holland
- Date of birth: 5 July 1953 (age 73)
- Place of birth: Sliema, Malta
- Position: Defender

Senior career*
Years	Team	Apps	(Gls)
1971–1989	Floriana	264	(18)

International career
1974–1987	Malta	61	(0)
- * Club domestic league appearances and goals

John Holland (born 5 July 1953) is a Maltese former footballer who played as a defender and made 61 appearances for the Malta national team.

== Career ==
Holland made his international debut for Malta on 24 August 1974 in a friendly match against Libya, which finished as a 0–1 loss. He went on to make 61 appearances, making his last appearance on 24 May 1987 in a UEFA Euro 1988 qualifying match against Sweden, which finished as a 0–1 loss. He served as the team captain on a total of 42 occasions from 1977 to 1987.

== Career statistics ==
=== International ===
Malta
Year	Apps	Goals
1974	3	0
1975	4	0
1976	5	0
1977	6	0
1978	3	0
1979	5	0
1980	2	0
1981	7	0
1982	4	0
1983	7	0
1984	5	0
1985	5	0
1986	2	0
1987	3	0
Total	61	0
