= Tony Grealish =

Ireland international footballer (1956–2013)

Personal information
- Full name: Anthony Patrick Grealish
- Date of birth: 21 September 1956
- Place of birth: Paddington, London, England
- Date of death: 23 April 2013 (aged 56)
- Place of death: Ilfracombe, Devon, England
- Height: 5 ft 7 in (1.70 m)
- Position: Midfielder

Youth career
- Leyton Orient

Senior career*
Years	Team	Apps	(Gls)
1974–1979	Leyton Orient	171	(10)
1979–1981	Luton Town	78	(2)
1981–1984	Brighton & Hove Albion	100	(6)
1984–1986	West Bromwich Albion	65	(5)
1986–1987	Manchester City	11	(0)
1987–1990	Rotherham United	110	(7)
1990–1992	Walsall	36	(1)
1992–1995	Bromsgrove Rovers	18	(0)
Total		589	(31)

International career
1976–1985	Republic of Ireland	45	(8)
- * Club domestic league appearances and goals

Anthony Patrick Grealish (21 September 1956 – 23 April 2013) was a professional footballer who played as a midfielder. Born in England to Irish parents, he played for the Republic of Ireland at international level.

== Career ==
Born in Paddington, London, Grealish played club football for Leyton Orient, Luton Town, Brighton & Hove Albion, West Bromwich Albion, Manchester City, Rotherham United, Walsall and Bromsgrove Rovers. Grealish captained Brighton in the 1983 FA Cup Final.

He represented the Republic of Ireland at international level, captaining his country 17 times, scoring 8 goals in 45 appearances between 1976 and 1985. He also appeared in a total of 13 FIFA World Cup qualifying matches.

Grealish died on 23 April 2013, at the age of 56, from cancer.

== Honours ==
Brighton & Hove Albion

- FA Cup runner-up: 1982–83

Rotherham United

- Football League Fourth Division: 1988–89

Individual

- PFA Team of the Year: 1988–89 Fourth Division

== See also ==
- List of Republic of Ireland international footballers born outside the Republic of Ireland
