= Jean Janssens (footballer) =

Belgian footballer

Jean Janssens (born 28 September 1944) is a former Belgian football player who won the Belgian Golden Shoe in 1979 while at Beveren. He was capped 7 times and scored 1 goal for the Belgium national team.

== Honours ==
Individual

- Belgian Golden Shoe: 1979
- Man of the Season (Belgian First Division): 1978–79
