= David Watson (footballer, born 1946) =

English footballer

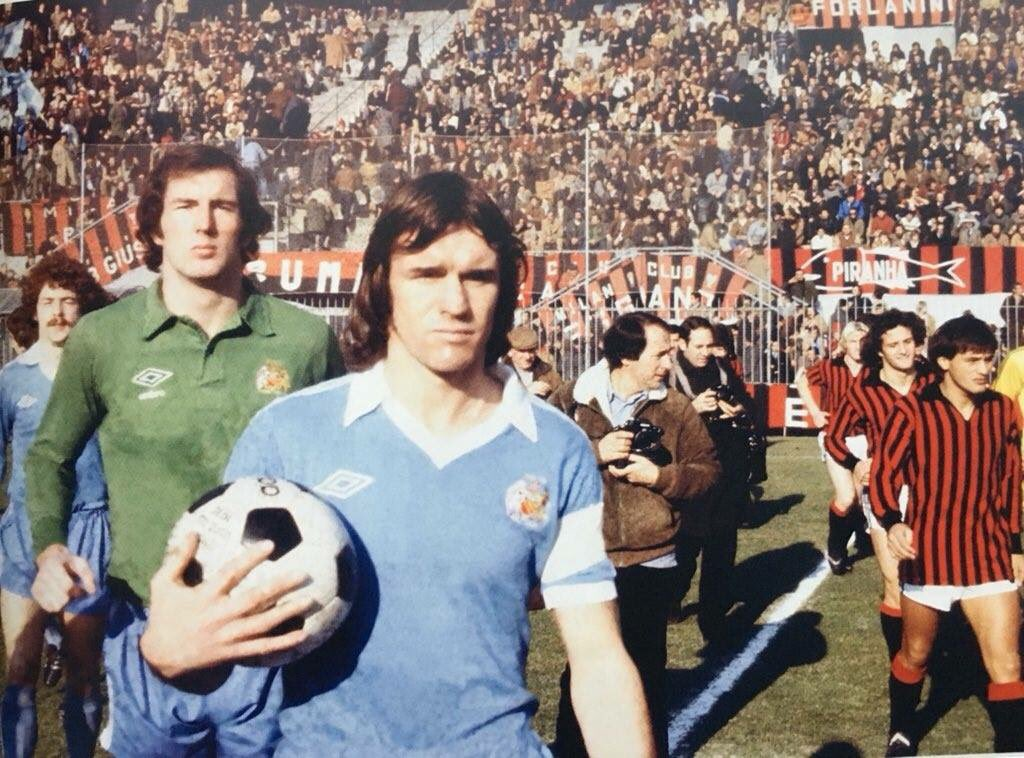
- David Watson in 1978

Personal information
- Full name: David Vernon Watson
- Date of birth: 5 October 1946 (age 80)
- Place of birth: Stapleford, Nottinghamshire, England
- Height: 5 ft 11 in (1.80 m)
- Position: Central defender

Youth career
- Stapleford O.B

Senior career*
Years	Team	Apps	(Gls)
1966–1967	Notts County	25	(1)
1967–1970	Rotherham United	121	(19)
1970–1975	Sunderland	177	(27)
1975–1979	Manchester City	146	(4)
1979	Werder Bremen	2	(0)
1979–1982	Southampton	73	(7)
1982–1983	Stoke City	59	(5)
1983	Vancouver Whitecaps	26	(3)
1983–1984	Derby County	34	(1)
1984	Fort Lauderdale Sun		
1984–1985	Notts County	25	(1)
1985–1986	Kettering Town	10	(3)
Total		698	(71)

International career
1974–1982	England	65	(4)
- * Club domestic league appearances and goals

David Vernon Watson (born 5 October 1946) is an English former professional footballer who played as a defender. During his club career, he played for Notts County, Rotherham United, Sunderland, Manchester City, Werder Bremen, Southampton, Stoke City, Vancouver Whitecaps and Derby County.

He won 65 caps with the England national team and was captain on three occasions.

== Club career ==
=== Notts County ===
Watson was born in Stapleford, Nottinghamshire, and started his career in 1966 as a striker with hometown club Notts County making 26 appearances in two seasons, before moving to Second Division Rotherham United in 1968.

=== Rotherham United ===
Watson was signed by Tommy Docherty in a player exchange deal which involved Keith Pring going to Notts County and the Millers paying £1,000. He was thrust into a relegation battle with Rotherham in 1967–68 which was unsuccessful and led to Docherty's departure. After four seasons at Millmoor where he made 141 appearances and scored 21 goals, he caught the attention of Sunderland manager Alan Brown who paid £100,000 for his services in December 1970.

In August 2025, Watson was voted Rotherham United's 'Player of the Century'.

=== Sunderland ===
At Roker Park, Watson began at centre forward, which many believed hindered their chances of gaining promotion. It was not until Bob Stokoe took over in November 1972 that Watson began to play at centre back. Sunderland reached the 1973 FA Cup final where they beat First Division Leeds United 1–0; he was able to keep Leeds's strike pairing of Allan Clarke and Mick Jones quiet and was praised by Stokoe. Following Sunderland's cup success the expectation was now for the club to gain promotion but they missed out by two points in both 1973–74 and 1974–75.

Watson is regarded as one of Sunderland's greatest defenders of all time.

=== Manchester City ===
In the summer of 1975, Watson joined First Division Manchester City for a fee of £175,000 in a deal which saw Jeff Clarke move the other way. Watson spent four seasons at Maine Road which saw Man City miss out on the title in 1976–77 by one point. They did win the League Cup in 1976 beating Newcastle United 2–1.

=== Werder Bremen ===
He left Manchester City in the summer of 1979 for German Bundesliga side Werder Bremen. His time at Bremen was short as after making his debut in a 1–0 win over Bayer Uerdingen he was sent off in his second match against 1860 Munich for "pushing" Hermann Bitz and banned by the German FA for eight weeks. He was fined by his club and refused to travel to an away match against FC Schalke 04 because of an injury before turning up to play for England.

=== Southampton ===
He returned to England by October with Southampton. Watson played 31 games in 1979–80 and 44 games in 1980–81 as the Saints finished 8th and 6th respectively. However, he was dropped by Lawrie McMenemy during the next season and he joined Stoke City in January 1982.

=== Stoke City ===
He played 24 times for Stoke in 1981–82 helping them to avoid relegation. He then played 40 times in 1982–83 as Stoke finished in a mid-table position of 13th. Watson spent the summer of 1983 with the Vancouver Whitecaps. He spent a season on loan at Derby County where he made 34 appearances.

=== Later career ===
Watson ended his league career at his first club Notts County, but continued playing into his 40s at non-league club Kettering Town.

== International career ==
Less than a year after the FA Cup victory and despite playing in the Second Division, he was given his debut for England in a friendly game against Portugal in Lisbon. Watson – quite advanced in years for a debutant at 27 – was one of six first-timers on show (among the others were Trevor Brooking) in what would prove to be 1966 World Cup-winning manager Alf Ramsey's last game in charge. Later in 1974, Watson won his second cap in a 2–0 defeat by Scotland at Hampden Park, Glasgow, coming on as a substitute for Norman Hunter. His first competitive game at international level was his seventh appearance in all as England defeated Czechoslovakia 3–0 at Wembley in a qualifier for the 1976 European Championships. Despite this scoreline, England would not ultimately qualify for the finals while the Czechoslovak team would go on to win it. Watson did not miss another England game until 1980.

During the same year, Watson's establishment as England's first choice central defender was galvanised by a 4–3 victory over Denmark in Copenhagen which set the seal on a qualification for UEFA Euro 1980 – England's first major tournament qualification for a decade. Watson continued his England career, earning his 50th cap against Argentina in a warm-up game prior to the European Championships in Italy. Watson duly played in all three of England's group games – against Belgium, Italy and Spain – but a draw, defeat and victory respectively was not enough for England to progress. His final appearance for England came against Iceland in June 1982 having gained 65 caps. He was excluded from the squad for the 1982 FIFA World Cup, with manager Ron Greenwood selecting only three central defenders, Phil Thompson, Terry Butcher and Steve Foster. He did however, appear in the video for "This Time We'll Get It Right", England's 1982 World Cup song. Watson remains the most-capped England player never to play in a World Cup finals match.

== Medical condition and legal claim ==
In February 2020, it was reported that Watson, then aged 73, was suffering from a neurodegenerative disease, with his wife, Penny, suggesting that "head injuries and repeated heading of the ball" were the cause.

In October 2025, the Upper Tribunal overturned a previous decision by the First-tier Tribunal that had rejected Watson's claim for industrial injury benefits related to his condition. The case has since been referred back to the First-tier Tribunal for re-determination.

== Personal life ==
Born in Stapleford, just west of Nottingham, he played youth football for Stapleford Old Boys and left school to work as a farm labourer and then as an electrician. His elder brother, Peter, was also a professional footballer. He has been married to Penelope Watson MBE since June 1969.

== Career statistics ==
=== Club ===
Appearances and goals by club, season and competition
Club	Season	League			FA Cup		League Cup		Other (Note: Appearances and goals in the Anglo-Italian Cup, Anglo-Scottish Cup, Texaco Cup, UEFA Cup and UEFA Cup Winners' Cup)		Total	
Club	Season	Division	Apps	Goals	Apps	Goals	Apps	Goals	Apps	Goals	Apps	Goals
Notts County	1966–67	Fourth Division	4	0	0	0	0	0	0	0	4	0
Notts County	1967–68	Fourth Division	21	1	0	0	1	0	0	0	22	0
Notts County	Total		25	1	0	0	1	0	0	0	26	1
Rotherham United	1967–68	Second Division	18	0	4	0	0	0	0	0	22	0
Rotherham United	1968–69	Third Division	44	8	4	0	0	0	0	0	48	8
Rotherham United	1969–70	Third Division	41	2	3	0	5	0	0	0	49	2
Rotherham United	1970–71	Third Division	18	9	2	3	2	0	0	0	22	12
Rotherham United	Total		121	19	13	3	7	0	0	0	141	22
Sunderland	1970–71	Second Division	17	4	0	0	0	0	0	0	17	4
Sunderland	1971–72	Second Division	42	13	4	1	1	0	4	1	47	15
Sunderland	1972–73	Second Division	37	3	9	4	1	0	0	0	47	4
Sunderland	1973–74	Second Division	41	3	2	0	4	0	4	0	51	3
Sunderland	1974–75	Second Division	40	4	2	0	1	0	3	0	46	4
Sunderland	Total		177	27	17	5	7	0	11	1	212	33
Manchester City	1975–76	First Division	31	1	1	0	7	1	3	0	42	2
Manchester City	1976–77	First Division	41	2	4	0	1	0	2	0	48	2
Manchester City	1977–78	First Division	41	0	2	0	6	0	2	0	51	2
Manchester City	1978–79	First Division	33	1	2	0	4	0	8	1	47	2
Manchester City	Total		146	4	9	0	18	1	15	1	188	6
Werder Bremen	1979–80	Bundesliga	2	0	0	0	0	0	0	0	2	0
Southampton	1979–80	First Division	30	4	1	0	0	0	0	0	31	4
Southampton	1980–81	First Division	38	2	4	0	2	0	0	0	44	2
Southampton	1981–82	First Division	5	1	0	0	1	0	2	0	8	1
Southampton	Total		73	7	5	0	3	0	2	0	83	7
Stoke City	1981–82	First Division	24	3	0	0	0	0	0	0	24	3
Stoke City	1982–83	First Division	35	2	3	0	2	1	0	0	40	3
Stoke City	Total		59	5	3	0	2	1	0	0	64	6
Vancouver Whitecaps	1983	NASL	26	3	–		–		–		26	3
Derby County	1983–84	Second Division	34	1	5	0	2	0	0	0	41	1
Notts County	1984–85	Second Division	25	1	1	0	1	0	0	0	27	1
Career total			688	68	53	8	41	2	28	2	810	80

=== International ===
Appearances and goals by national team and year
National team	Year	Apps	Goals
England	1974	7	0
England	1975	7	0
England	1977	11	0
England	1978	9	0
England	1979	10	4
England	1980	10	0
England	1981	5	0
England	1982	2	0
Total		61	4

== Honours ==
Sunderland

- FA Cup: 1972–73

Manchester City

- Football League Cup: 1975–76

England

- British Home Championship: 1973–74 (shared), 1974–75, 1977–78, 1978–79, 1981–82

Individual

- PFA Team of the Year: 1973–74 Second Division, 1974–75 Second Division, 1978–79 First Division, 1979–80 First Division
