= Einar Jan Aas =

Norwegian footballer (born 1955)

Einar Aas
Personal information
- Full name: Einar Jan Aas
- Date of birth: 12 October 1955 (age 71)
- Place of birth: Moss, Norway
- Height: 1.85 m (6 ft 1 in)
- Position: Centre-back

Senior career*
| Years | Team | Apps | (Gls) |
| 1972–1979 | Moss | | |
| 1979–1981 | Bayern Munich | 13 | (1) |
| 1981–1982 | Nottingham Forest | 21 | (1) |
| 1983–1987 | Moss | 43 | (1) |

International career
| 1977–1986 | Norway | 35 | (3) |
- * Club domestic league appearances and goals

Einar Jan Aas (born 12 October 1955) is a Norwegian former footballer who played as a centre-back. He was the first Norwegian to play professionally in England and Germany.

== Club career ==
Aas started his career in Moss FK in 1973. In 1976, they were promoted to the Norwegian Premier League, and Verdens Gang named him central defender of the year in 1977 and 1979.

His professional career started at Bayern Munich, where he stayed for the 1979–80 season. Midway through the following season, he was transferred to Nottingham Forest, at the time managed by Brian Clough. A broken leg put a premature end to his stay at the City Ground. He returned to Moss in 1984, and helped the club win its first and to date only League title in 1987, before retiring as a player.

== International career ==
Aas debuted in the Norway national team in 1978, and played 35 international matches in total, scoring three goals.

== Personal ==
He was educated at the Norwegian School of Sport Sciences.
