= 1989 Bulgarian Cup final =

- Event: 1988–89 Bulgarian Cup
CSKA Sofia	Chernomorets Burgas
A Group	B Group
3	0
- Date: 24 May 1989
- Venue: Slavi Aleksiev Stadium, Pleven
- Referee: Stefan Chakarov (Veliko Tarnovo)
- Attendance: 15,000

The 1989 Bulgarian Cup final was played at the Slavi Aleksiev Stadium in Pleven on 24 May 1989, and was contested between the sides of CSKA Sofia and Chernomorets Burgas. The match was won by CSKA.

== Match ==
=== Details ===
24 May 1989

CSKA Sofia	3–0	Chernomorets Burgas
Kostadinov 44'; Stoichkov 50'; Tanev 59'

Slavi Aleksiev Stadium, Pleven
Attendance: 15,000
Referee: Stefan Chakarov (Veliko Tarnovo)

CSKA	Chernomorets

CSKA:
GK	1	(Bulgaria) Iliya Valov	(substituted off) 71'
DF	2	(Bulgaria) Nedyalko Mladenov
DF	3	(Bulgaria) Trifon Ivanov
DF	4	(Bulgaria) Krasimir Bezinski
DF	5	(Bulgaria) Georgi Dimitrov (c)
MF	6	(Bulgaria) Kostadin Yanchev
FW	7	(Bulgaria) Emil Kostadinov
FW	8	(Bulgaria) Hristo Stoichkov
MF	9	(Bulgaria) Lachezar Tanev	(substituted off) 71'
MF	10	(Bulgaria) Ivaylo Kirov
MF	11	(Bulgaria) Georgi Georgiev
Substitutes:
GK		(Bulgaria) Rumen Apostolov	(substituted in) 71'
FW		(Bulgaria) Petar Vitanov	(substituted in) 71'
Manager:
(Bulgaria) Dimitar Penev

Chernomorets:
GK	1	(Bulgaria) Lyubomir Sheytanov (c)
DF	2	(Bulgaria) Ivan Yovchev
DF	3	(Bulgaria) Stoyan Pumpalov
DF	4	(Bulgaria) Stoyan Stoyanov
DF	5	(Bulgaria) Krasimir Kostov
MF	6	(Bulgaria) Zlatko Yankov
MF	7	(Bulgaria) Diyan Petkov	(substituted off) 61'
MF	8	(Bulgaria) Atanas Manushev	(substituted off) 66'
FW	9	(Bulgaria) Vladimir Stoyanov
MF	10	(Bulgaria) Nikolay Rusev
MF	11	(Bulgaria) Simeon Chilibonov
Substitutes:
MF		(Bulgaria) Zhivko Kelepov	(substituted in) 61'
FW		(Bulgaria) Lyubomir Lyubenov	(substituted in) 66'
Manager:
(Bulgaria) Evgeni Yanchovski

== See also ==
- 1988–89 A Group
- 1989 Bulgarian Supercup
