= 1988 Bulgarian Cup final =

- Event: 1987–88 Bulgarian Cup
Levski Sofia	CSKA Sofia
1	4
- Date: 11 May 1988
- Venue: Vasil Levski National Stadium, Sofia
- Referee: Velichko Tsonchev (Veliko Tarnovo)
- Attendance: 50,000

The 1988 Bulgarian Cup final was the 48th final of the Bulgarian Cup, and was contested between Levski Sofia and CSKA Sofia on 11 May 1988 at Vasil Levski National Stadium in Sofia. CSKA won the final 4–1.

== Match ==
=== Details ===
11 May 1988

Levski Sofia	1−4	CSKA Sofia
Iliev 13'		Stoichkov 6'; Penev 41' (pen.); Vitanov 85', 89'

Vasil Levski National Stadium, Sofia
Attendance: 50,000
Referee: Velichko Tsonchev (Veliko Tarnovo)

Levski	CSKA

GK	1	(Bulgaria) Borislav Mihaylov
DF	2	(Bulgaria) Kiril Vangelov	(substituted off) 46'
DF	3	(Bulgaria) Krasimir Koev
DF	4	(Bulgaria) Petar Petrov (c)
DF	5	(Bulgaria) Nikolay Iliev
MF	6	(Bulgaria) Stoil Georgiev
MF	7	(Bulgaria) Dinko Gospodinov
FW	8	(Bulgaria) Nasko Sirakov
FW	9	(Bulgaria) Petar Kurdov	(substituted off) 68'
MF	10	(Bulgaria) Georgi Yordanov
MF	11	(Bulgaria) Bozhidar Iskrenov
Substitutes:
FW	--	(Bulgaria) Sasho Nachev	(substituted in) 46'
FW	--	(Bulgaria) Rosen Krumov	(substituted in) 68'
Manager:
(Bulgaria) Vasil Metodiev

GK	1	(Bulgaria) Rumen Apostolov
DF	2	(Bulgaria) Nedyalko Mladenov (c)
DF	3	(Bulgaria) Aleksandar Aleksandrov
DF	4	(Bulgaria) Aydan Ilyazov
DF	5	(Bulgaria) Sasho Borisov
MF	6	(Bulgaria) Kostadin Yanchev
FW	7	(Bulgaria) Emil Kostadinov	(substituted off) 89'
FW	8	(Bulgaria) Hristo Stoichkov
FW	9	(Bulgaria) Lyuboslav Penev
MF	10	(Bulgaria) Petar Vitanov
MF	11	(Bulgaria) Ivaylo Kirov
Substitutes:
FW	--	(Bulgaria) Doncho Donev	(substituted in) 89'
Manager:
(Bulgaria) Dimitar Penev

== See also ==
- 1987–88 A Group
- 1988 Cup of the Soviet Army Final
