= 1989–90 A Group =

42nd completed season of top-tier football league in Bulgaria

Bulgarian A Group
- Season: 1989–90
- Champions: CSKA Sofia (26th title)
- Relegated: Hebar; Cherno More; Vratsa
- European Cup: CSKA Sofia
- UEFA Cup: Slavia Sofia
- Matches: 240
- Goals: 662 (2.76 per match)
- Top goalscorer: Hristo Stoichkov (38 goals)

The 1989–90 A Group was the 42nd season of the A Football Group, the top Bulgarian professional league for association football clubs, since its establishment in 1948. The campaign was won by CSKA Sofia, nine points ahead of Slavia Sofia. Hebar Pazardzhik, Cherno More Varna and Botev Vratsa were relegated.

== Teams ==
=== Stadiums and locations ===
Locations of the 1989–90 Bulgarian A Group teams
Sofia 1989–90 A Group football clubs

Team	City	Stadium	Capacity
Beroe	Stara Zagora	Beroe	18,000
Cherno More	Varna	Yuri Gagarin; Ticha	35,000; 8,000
Chernomorets	Burgas	Deveti Septemvri	18,000
CSKA	Sofia	Narodna Armia	26,000
Dunav	Ruse	Gradski; Dunav	22,000; 12,000
Etar	Veliko Tarnovo	Ivaylo	15,000
Hebar	Pazardzhik	Lyuben Shkodrov	12,000
Levski	Sofia	Levski; Rakovski	40,000; 18,000
Lokomotiv	Gorna Oryahovitsa	Dimitar Dyulgerov	14,000
Lokomotiv	Plovdiv	Lokomotiv; Deveti Septemvri	13,000; 50,000
Lokomotiv	Sofia	Vasil Levski National Stadium	60,000
Pirin	Blagoevgrad	Hristo Botev (Blagoevgrad)	15,000
Slavia	Sofia	Slavia	25,000
Sliven	Sliven	Hadzhi Dimitar	15,000
Trakia	Plovdiv	Hristo Botev (Plovdiv)	30,000
Vratsa	Vratsa	Hristo Botev (Vratsa)	25,000

=== Personnel ===
Team	Manager	Captain
Beroe	(Bulgaria) Petko Petkov	(Bulgaria) Petko Tenev
Cherno More	(Bulgaria) Nikola Kovachev	(Bulgaria) Todor Marev
Chernomorets	(Bulgaria) Ivan Vutov	(Bulgaria) Lyubomir Sheytanov
CSKA	(Bulgaria) Dimitar Penev	(Bulgaria) Lyuboslav Penev
Dunav	(Bulgaria) Simeon Simeonov	(Bulgaria) Nikolay Boyanov
Etar	(Bulgaria) Georgi Vasilev	(Bulgaria) Nikolay Donev
Hebar	(Bulgaria) Dimitar Milev	(Bulgaria) Lazar Dimitrov
Levski	(Bulgaria) Dobromir Zhechev	(Bulgaria) Georgi Yordanov
Lokomotiv GO	(Bulgaria) Kiril Rabchev	(Bulgaria) Angel Minchev
Lokomotiv Plovdiv	(Bulgaria) Mihail Georgiev	(Bulgaria) Stefan Draganov
Lokomotiv Sofia	(Bulgaria) Ventsislav Arsov	(Bulgaria) Pavel Dochev
Pirin	(Bulgaria) Boris Nikolov	(Bulgaria) Valentin Dartilov
Slavia	(Bulgaria) Ivan Vutsov	(Bulgaria) Plamen Simeonov
Sliven	(Bulgaria) Lyudmil Goranov	(Bulgaria) Petar Ivanov
Trakia	(Bulgaria) Dinko Dermendzhiev	(Bulgaria) Petar Zehtinski
Vratsa	(Bulgaria) Semko Goranov	(Bulgaria) Ivan Radoslavov

== League standings ==
Pos	Team	Pld	W	D	L	GF	GA	GD	Pts	Qualification or relegation
1	CSKA Sofia (C)	30	18	9	3	85	30	+55	45	Qualification for European Cup first round
2	Slavia Sofia	30	13	10	7	37	29	+8	36	Qualification for UEFA Cup first round
3	Etar Veliko Tarnovo	30	14	7	9	51	32	+19	35	
4	Levski Sofia	30	12	11	7	57	39	+18	35	
5	Lokomotiv Sofia	30	15	5	10	53	40	+13	35	
6	Pirin Blagoevgrad	30	13	8	9	46	32	+14	34	
7	Trakia Plovdiv	30	15	3	12	43	39	+4	33	
8	Lokomotiv G. Oryahovitsa	30	11	8	11	28	32	−4	30	
9	Sliven	30	12	5	13	41	44	−3	29	Qualification for Cup Winners' Cup first round
10	Beroe Stara Zagora	30	10	9	11	43	48	−5	29	
11	Chernomorets Burgas	30	11	7	12	36	41	−5	29	
12	Dunav Ruse	30	9	9	12	30	38	−8	27	
13	Lokomotiv Plovdiv	30	9	9	12	30	47	−17	27	
14	Hebar Pazardzhik (R)	30	10	5	15	29	43	−14	25	Relegation to 1990–91 B Group
15	Cherno More (R)	30	6	4	20	28	63	−35	16	Relegation to 1990–91 B Group
16	Vratsa (R)	30	5	5	20	25	65	−40	15	Relegation to 1990–91 B Group

Source: rsssf.com
(C) Champions; (R) Relegated

== Results ==
Home \ Away	BSZ	CHM	CHB	CSK	DUN	ETA	HEB	LEV	LGO	LPL	LSO	PIR	SLA	SLI	TRA	VRA
Beroe Stara Zagora		1–1	1–0	3–3	3–1	0–1	1–1	1–1	0–0	3–2	0–2	5–1	3–0	0–3	2–1	3–2
Cherno More	3–3		1–2	1–2	2–0	0–4	0–1	0–0	2–1	1–1	3–6	2–1	0–2	2–0	1–0	3–0
Chernomorets Burgas	1–3	4–1		0–0	2–1	1–1	3–0	1–1	2–2	2–1	2–1	0–0	1–1	3–0	1–0	2–0
CSKA Sofia	4–0	6–1	3–0		4–1	5–2	3–1	5–0	2–0	4–0	1–2	3–1	1–2	4–0	6–1	6–0
Dunav Ruse	2–2	1–0	1–0	2–2		2–0	1–1	1–1	0–0	1–0	0–3	3–1	1–1	1–0	1–0	5–0
Etar Veliko Tarnovo	1–0	1–0	6–0	1–1	0–1		4–0	0–0	2–0	3–0	2–2	2–0	0–1	2–2	4–1	3–0
Hebar Pazardzhik	1–2	5–1	2–1	0–3	0–0	1–1		2–0	1–0	2–1	3–0	0–1	1–1	1–2	1–0	2–1
Levski Sofia	2–1	4–0	1–2	2–2	3–1	4–1	1–2		1–0	7–2	1–1	1–1	2–0	4–1	3–1	4–0
Lokomotiv G. Oryahovitsa	0–0	1–0	2–0	1–1	1–0	1–0	3–1	1–1		1–0	1–1	1–1	3–2	2–0	1–0	2–0
Lokomotiv Plovdiv	1–1	2–1	2–1	2–2	2–0	1–0	1–0	1–1	2–1		2–1	1–1	0–0	2–1	0–2	2–1
Lokomotiv Sofia	3–0	3–1	1–0	0–2	4–0	4–2	2–0	1–4	1–0	2–0		2–2	2–2	1–2	0–1	4–2
Pirin Blagoevgrad	3–0	1–0	1–0	1–1	1–0	2–3	4–0	1–0	6–0	2–0	2–0		0–0	2–1	2–0	5–1
Slavia Sofia	2–1	2–0	3–1	1–1	1–0	0–0	1–0	3–1	2–1	4–0	1–2	1–0		1–0	1–1	0–0
Sliven	3–1	3–0	1–1	0–3	2–2	1–3	2–0	2–3	3–1	1–1	1–2	2–1	2–0		3–0	1–0
Trakia Plovdiv	2–1	4–0	3–1	2–0	2–1	2–1	2–0	3–2	1–0	0–0	1–0	3–2	3–1	1–1		5–0
Vratsa	1–2	2–1	1–2	3–5	0–0	0–1	1–0	2–2	0–1	1–1	2–0	0–0	2–0	0–1	3–1	

Source: A PFG (in Bulgarian)
Legend: Blue = home team win; Yellow = draw; Red = away team win.

== Champions ==
CSKA Sofia

Goalkeepers
(Bulgaria) Iliya Valov	23	(0)
(Bulgaria) Rumen Apostolov	9	(0)

Defenders
(Bulgaria) Marius Urukov	28	(1)
(Bulgaria) Stefan Bachev	18	(0)
(Bulgaria) Emil Dimitrov	28	(1)
(Bulgaria) Dimitar Mladenov	27	(1)
(Bulgaria) Trifon Ivanov	28	(3)

Midfielders
(Bulgaria) Georgi Georgiev	26	(5)
(Bulgaria) Kostadin Yanchev	27	(0)
(Bulgaria) Ivaylo Kirov	15	(4)
(Bulgaria) Petar Vitanov	22	(3)
(Bulgaria) Marin Bakalov	26	(5)
(Bulgaria) Viktorio Pavlov	3	(1)
(Bulgaria) Slavcho Iliev	7	(0)

Forwards
(Bulgaria) Hristo Stoichkov	30	(38)
(Bulgaria) Emil Kostadinov	26	(6)
(Bulgaria) Doncho Donev	16	(4)
(Bulgaria) Lyuboslav Penev*	6	(12)
(Bulgaria) Rumen Stoyanov	3	(0)

Manager
(Bulgaria) Dimitar Penev

- Penev left the club during a season.

== Top scorers ==
Rank	Scorer	Club	Goals
1	(Bulgaria) Hristo Stoichkov	CSKA Sofia	38
2	(Bulgaria) Petar Mihtarski	Levski Sofia	24
3	(Bulgaria) Gosho Petkov	Lokomotiv Sofia	17
4	(Bulgaria) Yordan Lechkov	Sliven	16
5	(Bulgaria) Valentin Stanchev	Vratsa	15
6	(Bulgaria) Antim Pehlivanov	Trakia Plovdiv	13
6	(Bulgaria) Nikolay Petrunov	Pirin Blagoevgrad	13
8	(Bulgaria) Lyuboslav Penev	CSKA Sofia	12
9	(Bulgaria) Boncho Genchev	Etar Veliko Tarnovo	11
9	(Bulgaria) Georgi Dimitrov	Lokomotiv Plovdiv	11
9	(Bulgaria) Yordan Bozdanski	Pirin Blagoevgrad	11

== Attendances ==
#	Club	Average
1	Hebar	12,533
2	Trakia	11,133
3	Lokomotiv Plovdiv	10,333
4	CSKA Sofia	8,929
5	Chernomorets	8,600
6	Levski	8,133
7	Etar	8,000
8	Sliven	7,833
9	Dunav	7,467
10	Lokomotiv GO	7,321
11	Beroe	6,667
12	Pirin	6,533
13	Slavia Sofia	4,833
14	Cherno More	4,153
15	Botev	4,153
16	Lokomotiv Sofia	3,233
