= 1987 Bulgarian Cup final =

- Event: 1986–87 Bulgarian Cup
CSKA Sofia	Levski Sofia
2	1
- Date: 13 May 1987
- Venue: Vasil Levski National Stadium, Sofia
- Referee: Borislav Aleksandrov (Sofia)
- Attendance: 40,000

The 1987 Bulgarian Cup final was the 47th final of the Bulgarian Cup, and was contested between CSKA Sofia and Levski Sofia on 13 May 1987 at Vasil Levski National Stadium in Sofia. CSKA won the final 2–1.

== Match ==
=== Details ===
13 May 1987

CSKA Sofia	2−1	Levski Sofia
Kirov 33'; Penev 39'		Gochev 62' (pen.)

Vasil Levski National Stadium, Sofia
Attendance: 40,000
Referee: Borislav Aleksandrov (Sofia)

CSKA	Levski

GK	1	(Bulgaria) Georgi Velinov
DF	2	(Bulgaria) Nedyalko Mladenov
DF	3	(Bulgaria) Aleksandar Aleksandrov
DF	4	(Bulgaria) Krasimir Bezinski
DF	5	(Bulgaria) Sasho Borisov
MF	6	(Bulgaria) Kostadin Yanchev
FW	7	(Bulgaria) Emil Kostadinov
FW	8	(Bulgaria) Hristo Stoichkov	(substituted off) 88'
FW	9	(Bulgaria) Lyuboslav Penev
MF	10	(Bulgaria) Lachezar Tanev (c)
MF	11	(Bulgaria) Ivaylo Kirov
Substitutes:
DF	--	(Bulgaria) Aydan Ilyazov	(substituted in) 88'
Manager:
(Bulgaria) Dimitar Penev

GK	1	(Bulgaria) Borislav Mihaylov
DF	2	(Bulgaria) Stoil Georgiev
DF	3	(Bulgaria) Krasimir Koev
DF	4	(Bulgaria) Petar Petrov
DF	5	(Bulgaria) Nikolay Iliev
MF	6	(Bulgaria) Dimitar Markov
FW	7	(Bulgaria) Rusi Gochev (c)	(substituted off) 74'
MF	8	(Bulgaria) Vladko Shalamanov	(substituted off) 61'
MF	9	(Bulgaria) Emil Velev
MF	10	(Bulgaria) Georgi Yordanov
FW	11	(Bulgaria) Bozhidar Iskrenov
Substitutes:
FW	--	(Bulgaria) Stefan Vasilev	(substituted in) 61'
FW	--	(Bulgaria) Sasho Nachev	(substituted in) 74'
Manager:
(Bulgaria) Pavel Panov

== See also ==
- 1986–87 A Group
