= 1989 Bulgarian Supercup =

CSKA Sofia	Chernomorets Burgas
A Group	A Group
1	0
- Date: 1 August 1989
- Venue: Chernomorets, Burgas, Bulgaria
- Referee: Nedyalko Tahtadzhiev (Plovdiv)
- Attendance: 25,000

The 1989 Bulgarian Supercup was the first Bulgarian Supercup match, a football match which was contested between the "A" professional football group champion, CSKA Sofia, and the runner-up of Bulgarian Cup, Chernomorets Burgas. The match was held on 1 August 1989 at the Chernomorets Stadium in Burgas, Bulgaria. CSKA beat Chernomorets 1–0 after to win their first Bulgarian Supercup.

== Match details ==
1 August 1989
18:00

CSKA Sofia	1–0	Chernomorets Burgas
Stoichkov 17'

Chernomorets Stadium, Burgas
Attendance: 25,000
Referee: Nedyalko Tahtandzhiev (Plovdiv)

CSKA Sofia	Chernomorets

CSKA Sofia:
GK	1	(Bulgaria) Iliya Valov
DF	2	(Bulgaria) Emil Dimitrov (substituted off) 57'
DF	3	(Bulgaria) Trifon Ivanov
DF	4	(Bulgaria) Petar Vitanov
DF	5	(Bulgaria) Dimitar Mladenov
MF	6	(Bulgaria) Kostadin Yanchev
FW	7	(Bulgaria) Emil Kostadinov (substituted off) 60'
FW	8	(Bulgaria) Hristo Stoichkov (substituted off) 72'
FW	9	(Bulgaria) Lyuboslav Penev
MF	10	(Bulgaria) Marin Bakalov
MF	11	(Bulgaria) Ivaylo Kirov (substituted off) 74'
Substitutes:
DF		(Bulgaria) Stefan Bachev (substituted in) 57'
FW		(Bulgaria) Doncho Donev (substituted in) 60'
FW		(Bulgaria) Anton Dimitrov (substituted in) 72'
DF		(Bulgaria) Marius Urukov (substituted in) 72'
Manager:
(Bulgaria) Dimitar Penev

Chernomorets Burgas:
GK	1	(Bulgaria) Lyubomir Sheytanov
DF	2	(Bulgaria) Miroslav Kralev (substituted off) 46'
DF	3	(Bulgaria) Stoyan Stoyanov
DF	4	(Bulgaria) Rosen Petrov
DF	5	(Bulgaria) Krasimir Kostov
MF	6	(Bulgaria) Zlatko Yankov
MF	7	(Bulgaria) Valentin Ivanov (substituted off) 82'
MF	8	(Bulgaria) Diyan Petkov
FW	9	(Bulgaria) Lyubomir Lyubenov (substituted off) 46'
MF	10	(Bulgaria) Manushev (substituted off) 69'
FW	11	(Bulgaria) Simeon Chilibonov
Substitutes:
DF		(Bulgaria) Rosen Atanasov (substituted in) 46'
FW		(Bulgaria) Ivan Yovchev (substituted in) 46'
FW		(Bulgaria) Ivan Aleksandrov (substituted in) 69'
MF		(Bulgaria) Mihail Ganev (substituted in) 82'
Manager:
(Bulgaria) Vasil Zhelev
