= 1988–89 A Group =

41st completed season of top-tier football league in Bulgaria

Bulgarian A Group
- Season: 1988–89
- Champions: CSKA Sofia (25th title)
- Relegated: Spartak Varna; Minyor
- European Cup: CSKA Sofia
- UEFA Cup: Levski Sofia
- Matches: 240
- Goals: 642 (2.68 per match)
- Top goalscorer: Hristo Stoichkov (23 goals)

The 1988–89 A Group was the 41st season of the A Football Group, the top Bulgarian professional league for association football clubs, since its establishment in 1948. The campaign was won by CSKA Sofia, ten points ahead of Levski Sofia. Spartak Varna and Minyor Pernik were relegated.

== Teams ==
=== Stadiums and locations ===
Locations of the 1988–89 Bulgarian A Group teams
Sofia 1988–89 A Group football clubs

Team	City	Stadium	Capacity
Beroe	Stara Zagora	Beroe	18,000
Cherno More	Varna	Yuri Gagarin; Ticha	35,000; 8,000
CSKA	Sofia	Narodna Armia	26,000
Dunav	Ruse	Gradski; Dunav	22,000; 12,000
Etar	Veliko Tarnovo	Ivaylo	15,000
Levski	Sofia	Levski; Rakovski	40,000; 18,000
Lokomotiv	Gorna Oryahovitsa	Dimitar Dyulgerov	14,000
Lokomotiv	Plovdiv	Lokomotiv; Deveti Septemvri	13,000; 50,000
Lokomotiv	Sofia	Vasil Levski National Stadium	60,000
Minyor	Pernik	Minyor	16,000
Pirin	Blagoevgrad	Hristo Botev (Blagoevgrad)	15,000
Slavia	Sofia	Slavia	25,000
Sliven	Sliven	Hadzhi Dimitar	15,000
Spartak	Varna	Spartak	12,000
Trakia	Plovdiv	Hristo Botev (Plovdiv)	30,000
Vratsa	Vratsa	Hristo Botev (Vratsa)	25,000

=== Personnel ===
Team	Manager	Captain
Beroe	(Bulgaria) Petko Petkov	(Bulgaria) Petko Tenev
Cherno More	(Bulgaria) Bozhil Kolev	(Bulgaria) Todor Marev
CSKA	(Bulgaria) Dimitar Penev	(Bulgaria) Georgi Dimitrov
Dunav	(Bulgaria) Simeon Simeonov	(Bulgaria) Borislav Bogomilov
Etar	(Bulgaria) Georgi Vasilev	(Bulgaria) Emil Dimitrov
Levski	(Bulgaria) Vasil Metodiev	(Bulgaria) Petar Petrov
Lokomotiv GO	(Bulgaria) Todor Velev	(Bulgaria) Angel Minchev
Lokomotiv Plovdiv	(Bulgaria) Stancho Bonchev	(Bulgaria) Ayan Sadakov
Lokomotiv Sofia	(Bulgaria) Atanas Mihaylov	(Bulgaria) Stoycho Stoev
Minyor	(Bulgaria) Evlogi Banchev	(Bulgaria) Rumen Andonov
Pirin	(Bulgaria) Boris Nikolov	(Bulgaria) Petar Tsvetkov
Slavia	(Bulgaria) Hristo Mladenov	(Bulgaria) Antonio Ananiev
Sliven	(Bulgaria) Lyudmil Goranov	(Bulgaria) Tenko Dobrev
Spartak Varna	(Bulgaria) Blagoy Kalfov	(Bulgaria) Zhivko Gospodinov
Trakia	(Bulgaria) Ivan Gluhchev	(Bulgaria) Dimitar Mladenov
Vratsa	(Bulgaria) Petar Kamenov	(Bulgaria) Emil Marinov

== League standings ==
Pos	Team	Pld	W	D	L	GF	GA	GD	Pts	Qualification or relegation
1	CSKA Sofia (Note: The champion CSKA Sofia also won the Bulgarian Cup and the losing finalists of B Group side Chernomorets Burgas were handed the 1989–90 European Cup Winners' Cup Preliminary round spot.) (C)	30	20	9	1	86	24	+62	49	Qualification for European Cup first round
2	Levski Sofia	30	17	5	8	63	38	+25	39	Qualification for UEFA Cup first round
3	Etar Veliko Tarnovo	30	13	8	9	48	30	+18	34	Qualification for Intertoto Cup
4	Trakia Plovdiv	30	12	9	9	49	36	+13	33	
5	Beroe Stara Zagora	30	13	7	10	41	46	−5	33	
6	Dunav Ruse	30	12	7	11	29	32	−3	31	
7	Cherno More Varna	30	10	10	10	33	43	−10	30	
8	Lokomotiv Sofia	30	12	4	14	36	34	+2	28	
9	Pirin Blagoevgrad	30	12	3	15	34	33	+1	27	
10	Sliven	30	11	5	14	38	39	−1	27	
11	Slavia Sofia	30	8	10	12	32	36	−4	26	
12	Lokomotiv G. Oryahovitsa	30	11	4	15	26	45	−19	26	
13	Vratsa	30	9	8	13	32	53	−21	26	
14	Lokomotiv Plovdiv	30	10	6	14	31	55	−24	26	
15	Spartak Varna (R)	30	7	9	14	37	54	−17	23	Relegation to 1989–90 B Group and Qualification for Intertoto Cup
16	Minyor Pernik (R)	30	8	6	16	27	44	−17	22	Relegation to 1989–90 B Group

Source: RSSSF - Bulgaria Championship History 1924-2009
Rules for classification: 1st points; 2nd goal difference; 3rd goals scored; 4th head-to-head points; 5th head-to-head goal difference; 6th head-to-head goals scored; 7th head-to-head away goals scored;
(C) Champions; (R) Relegated

== Results ==
Home \ Away	BSZ	CHM	CSK	DUN	ETA	LEV	LGO	LPL	LSO	MIN	PIR	SLA	SLI	SPV	TRA	VRA
Beroe Stara Zagora		3–0	2–3	2–1	1–0	1–0	3–2	2–1	3–3	0–0	2–0	1–0	1–1	3–1	1–1	1–3
Cherno More	2–0		0–0	2–2	3–1	1–1	1–0	6–1	0–0	2–0	1–0	1–0	1–0	1–1	0–0	1–1
CSKA Sofia	4–2	6–2		3–0	1–0	2–1	7–1	7–0	4–2	6–0	2–0	4–1	7–1	4–0	1–1	5–1
Dunav Ruse	0–0	2–1	0–3		1–0	2–1	1–0	2–0	2–1	0–1	1–2	0–0	2–0	2–1	1–0	2–0
Etar Veliko Tarnovo	4–0	3–0	1–1	1–0		2–0	4–1	1–1	1–0	2–1	0–1	1–0	3–1	4–2	4–1	0–0
Levski Sofia	3–1	1–1	2–2	3–0	4–3		1–0	2–0	3–1	4–2	2–0	5–2	3–0	0–1	2–1	6–0
Lokomotiv G. Oryahovitsa	1–2	1–0	0–3	0–1	0–4	2–1		2–0	0–2	1–0	1–0	2–1	1–0	3–2	1–0	3–1
Lokomotiv Plovdiv	1–4	2–2	1–1	0–0	2–1	2–2	2–1		2–1	3–0	1–0	1–0	1–0	1–3	1–0	3–0
Lokomotiv Sofia	2–0	4–0	0–1	1–0	1–3	0–2	0–0	2–0		0–1	2–0	3–1	2–0	3–0	2–1	2–1
Minyor Pernik	3–0	0–1	1–1	0–2	1–1	2–2	1–2	1–0	1–0		1–2	0–1	0–1	2–1	1–1	4–1
Pirin Blagoevgrad	1–2	2–0	1–1	2–0	2–0	1–4	3–0	3–0	2–0	3–0		0–0	1–0	0–0	4–1	1–2
Slavia Sofia	5–1	2–0	2–2	1–1	0–0	1–2	0–0	3–0	3–1	0–2	2–1		1–0	2–2	1–1	3–1
Sliven	3–0	1–2	1–1	3–1	1–1	0–1	2–0	3–1	2–0	0–0	1–0	0–0		5–1	2–0	3–0
Spartak Varna	0–2	1–1	0–2	1–0	2–1	1–2	1–1	0–0	0–0	3–1	3–1	2–0	2–3		2–2	2–2
Trakia Plovdiv	1–1	4–1	1–0	2–2	1–1	4–2	2–0	5–0	1–0	2–0	2–0	2–0	4–3	4–2		4–0
Vratsa	0–0	4–0	0–2	1–1	1–1	3–1	0–0	1–4	0–1	2–1	2–1	0–0	2–1	2–0	1–0	

Source: A PFG (in Bulgarian)
Legend: Blue = home team win; Yellow = draw; Red = away team win.

== Champions ==
CSKA Sofia

Goalkeepers
(Bulgaria) Iliya Valov	23	(0)
(Bulgaria) Rumen Apostolov	10	(0)

Defenders
(Bulgaria) Nedyalko Mladenov	22	(0)
(Bulgaria) Stefan Bachev	28	(1)
(Bulgaria) Krasimir Bezinski	25	(0)
(Bulgaria) Georgi Dimitrov	22	(2)
(Bulgaria) Kiril Kachamanov	12	(0)
(Bulgaria) Trifon Ivanov	29	(3)

Midfielders
(Bulgaria) Georgi Georgiev	24	(4)
(Bulgaria) Kostadin Yanchev	21	(1)
(Bulgaria) Ivaylo Kirov	26	(4)
(Bulgaria) Petar Vitanov	24	(3)
(Bulgaria) Lachezar Tanev	14	(3)

Forwards
(Bulgaria) Hristo Stoichkov	26	(23)
(Bulgaria) Emil Kostadinov	29	(12)
(Bulgaria) Doncho Donev	12	(1)
(Bulgaria) Lyuboslav Penev	22	(21)
(Bulgaria) Plamen Getov*	11	(8)
(Bulgaria) Rumen Stoyanov	3	(0)

Manager
(Bulgaria) Dimitar Penev

- Getov left the club during a season.

== Top scorers ==
Rank	Scorer	Club	Goals
1	(Bulgaria) Hristo Stoichkov	CSKA Sofia	23
2	(Bulgaria) Lyuboslav Penev	CSKA Sofia	21
3	(Bulgaria) Vasil Dragolov	Levski Sofia	18
4	(Bulgaria) Preslav Getov	Etar Veliko Tarnovo	14
4	(Bulgaria) Nikolay Petrunov	Pirin Blagoevgrad	14
6	(Bulgaria) Plamen Kazakov	Spartak Varna	13
7	(Bulgaria) Emil Kostadinov	CSKA Sofia	12
7	(Bulgaria) Petar Aleksandrov	Slavia Sofia	12
7	(Bulgaria) Rosen Krumov	Levski Sofia	12
10	(Bulgaria) Antim Pehlivanov	Botev Plovdiv	11
10	(Bulgaria) Myumyun Kashmer	Beroe Stara Zagora	11

== Attendances ==
#	Club	Average
1	Dunav	13,400
2	CSKA Sofia	12,667
3	Lokomotiv Plovdiv	10,500
4	Levski	9,071
5	Beroe	9,000
6	Trakia	8,538
7	Lokomotiv GO	8,367
8	Cherno More	8,357
9	Etar	8,000
10	Sliven	7,857
11	Pirin	7,286
12	Minyor	6,633
13	Botev	6,600
14	Varna	5,867
15	Slavia Sofia	4,480
16	Lokomotiv Sofia	4,287
