= Trifon Ivanov =

Bulgarian footballer (1965–2016)

Personal information
- Full name: Trifon Marinov Ivanov
- Date of birth: 27 July 1965
- Place of birth: Veliko Tarnovo, Bulgaria
- Date of death: 13 February 2016 (aged 50)
- Place of death: Samovodene, Bulgaria
- Height: 1.81 m (5 ft 11 in)
- Position: Centre-back

Senior career*
Years	Team	Apps	(Gls)
1983–1988	Etar Veliko Tarnovo	62	(7)
1988–1990	CSKA Sofia	64	(8)
1990–1993	Real Betis	52	(9)
1991	→ Etar Veliko Tarnovo (loan)	12	(1)
1992	→ CSKA Sofia (loan)	5	(1)
1993–1995	Neuchâtel Xamax	25	(3)
1995	→ CSKA Sofia (loan)	7	(0)
1995–1997	Rapid Wien	53	(7)
1997–1998	Austria Wien	11	(0)
1998	→ CSKA Sofia (loan)	10	(1)
1998–2001	Floridsdorfer AC	52	(8)
Total		353	(45)

International career
1988–1998	Bulgaria	76	(6)
- * Club domestic league appearances and goals

Trifon Marinov Ivanov (Bulgarian: Трифон Маринов Иванов; 27 July 1965 – 13 February 2016) was a Bulgarian professional footballer who played as a central defender.

Ivanov made his debut for Bulgaria in 1988, earning 76 caps and scoring 6 goals over a ten-year international career. He appeared in the 1994 and 1998 FIFA World Cups, as well as the 1996 UEFA European Championship.

== Club career ==
Ivanov started his career with Etar Veliko Tarnovo. He made his first team debut during the 1983–84 A Group season, and established himself as a regular player two years later. Ivanov played 62 games and scored 7 goals for Etar in the A Group.

After five seasons at Etar, Ivanov joined CSKA Sofia where he won two A Group titles, one Bulgarian Cup, and one Bulgarian Supercup. He made his debut in a 5–1 home league win over Botev Vratsa on 13 August 1988. Ivanov scored his first goal for the club on 12 October, in a 7–1 thumping of Sliven.

In January 1991, Ivanov transferred to La Liga side Real Betis. He finished the season with 5 goals in 20 matches, but Betis were relegated to Segunda División. Whilst at Betis, he spent time out on loan at his previous clubs Etar and CSKA, before joining Swiss club Neuchâtel Xamax on a permanent basis in 1993.

In 1995, Ivanov signed with Rapid Wien, where he was a losing finalist in the 1995–96 UEFA Cup Winners' Cup. With Rapid he won one Austrian Bundesliga-title.

== International career ==
Ivanov's international distinctions included being a member of the Bulgaria national team that reached the fourth place in the 1994 FIFA World Cup in the United States. He also participated in the UEFA Euro 1996 in England. Ivanov's goal against Russia on 10 September 1997, in the qualifiers for the 1998 FIFA World Cup in France, was the one that clinched Bulgarian qualification. Ivanov scored six goals in 76 caps in the course of ten years with the national side.

Ivanov was famous for his long-range shots and free-kicks at goal. In Euro 96 particularly, he had a number of 40–45 yards shots at goal narrowly missing the target.

== Death ==
Ivanov died of a heart attack on 13 February 2016.

== Legacy ==
In 2013, a Brazilian amateur tournament was named after him.

== Career statistics ==
=== International ===
Appearances and goals by national team and year
National team	Year	Apps	Goals
Bulgaria	1988	9	1
Bulgaria	1989	7	1
Bulgaria	1990	4	0
Bulgaria	1991	6	1
Bulgaria	1992	6	0
Bulgaria	1993	5	1
Bulgaria	1994	12	1
Bulgaria	1995	8	0
Bulgaria	1996	9	0
Bulgaria	1997	5	1
Bulgaria	1998	5	0
Total		76	6

Scores and results list Bulgaria's goal tally first, score column indicates score after each Ivanov goal.

List of international goals scored by Trifon Ivanov
No.	Date	Venue	Opponent	Score	Result	Competition
1	13 April 1988	Chernomorets Stadium, Burgas, Bulgaria	East Germany	1–1	1–1	Friendly
2	11 October 1989	Yuri Gagarin Stadium, Varna, Bulgaria	Greece	1–0	4–0	1990 World Cup Qualifier
3	22 May 1991	Stadio Olimpico, Serravalle, San Marino	San Marino	1–0	3–0	Euro 1992 Qualifier
4	14 April 1993	Ernst-Happel-Stadion, Vienna, Austria	Austria	1–2	1–3	1994 World Cup Qualifier
5	14 December 1994	Cardiff Arms Park, Cardiff, Wales	Wales	1–0	3–0	Euro 1996 Qualifier
6	10 September 1997	Vasil Levski Stadium, Sofia, Bulgaria	Russia	1–0	1–0	1998 World Cup Qualifier

== Honours ==
CSKA Sofia

- Bulgarian A Group: 1988–89, 1989–90, 1991–92
- Bulgarian Cup: 1988–89
- Bulgarian Supercup: 1989

Rapid Wien

- Austrian Bundesliga: 1995–96
- UEFA Cup Winners' Cup: runner-up 1995–96

Bulgaria

- FIFA World Cup fourth place: 1994
