= Getov =

Getov (Bulgarian: Гетов) is a Bulgarian masculine surname, its feminine counterpart is Getova. It may refer to

- Plamen Getov (born 1959), Bulgarian football player
- Preslav Getov (born 1965), Bulgarian football player
- Venera Getova (born 1980), Bulgarian discus thrower
