= 1994 Ballon d'Or =

Annual association football award event in France

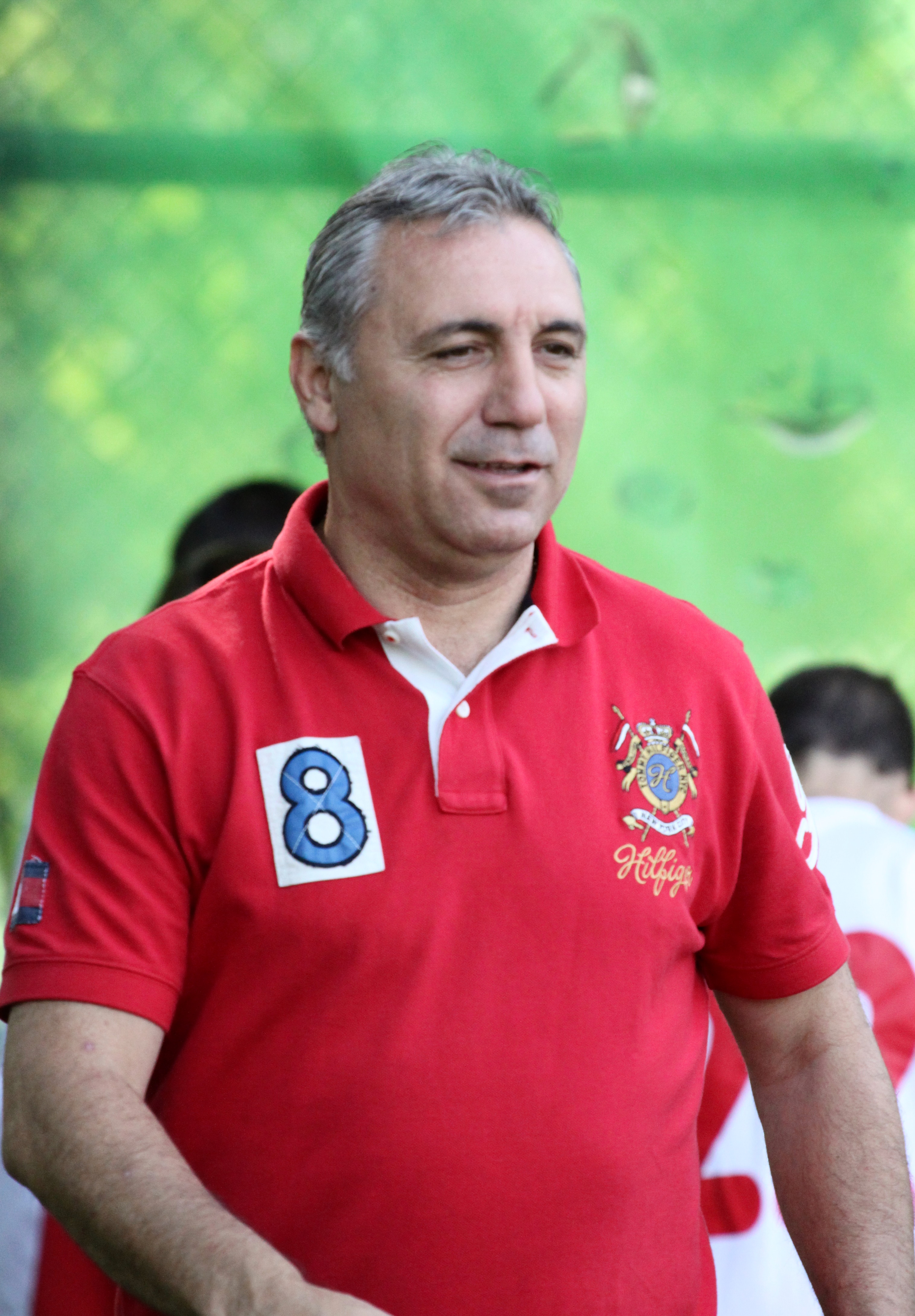
- 1994 Ballon d'Or winner, Hristo Stoichkov in 2011
- Date: 20 December 1994
- Presented by: France Football

Highlights
- Won by: (Bulgaria) Hristo Stoichkov (1st award)
- Website: ballondor.com

The 1994 Ballon d'Or, given to the best football player in Europe as judged by a panel of sports journalists from UEFA member countries, was awarded to Hristo Stoichkov on 20 December 1994.

Stoichkov was the first Bulgarian national to win the award. He was the third Barcelona player to win the trophy after Luis Suárez (1960), and Johan Cruyff (1973, 1974).

== Rankings ==
| Rank | Name | Club(s) | Nationality | Points |
|---|---|---|---|---|
| 1 | Hristo Stoichkov | (Spain) Barcelona | Bulgaria | 210 |
| 2 | Roberto Baggio | (Italy) Juventus | Italy | 136 |
| 3 | Paolo Maldini | (Italy) Milan | Italy | 109 |
| 4 | Gheorghe Hagi | (Spain) Barcelona | Romania | 68 |
| 4 | Tomas Brolin | (Italy) Parma | Sweden | 68 |
| 6 | Jürgen Klinsmann | (England) Tottenham Hotspur | Germany | 43 |
| 7 | Thomas Ravelli | (Sweden) IFK Göteborg | Sweden | 21 |
| 8 | Jari Litmanen | (Netherlands) Ajax | Finland | 12 |
| 9 | Marcel Desailly | (Italy) Milan | France | 8 |
| 9 | Dejan Savićević | (Italy) Milan | FR Yugoslavia | 8 |
| 11 | Franco Baresi | (Italy) Milan | Italy | 7 |
| 11 | Michel Preud'homme | (Portugal) Benfica | Belgium | 7 |
| 13 | Michael Laudrup | (Spain) Real Madrid | Denmark | 4 |
| 13 | Yordan Letchkov | (Germany) Hamburger SV | Bulgaria | 4 |
| 13 | Eric Cantona | (England) Manchester United | France | 4 |
| 16 | Krasimir Balakov (Note: France Football reports Balakov with 4 points.) | (Portugal) Sporting CP | Bulgaria | 3 |
| 16 | José Luis Caminero | (Spain) Atlético Madrid | Spain | 3 |
| 16 | Jean-Pierre Papin | (Germany) Bayern Munich | France | 3 |
| 16 | Giuseppe Signori | (Italy) Lazio | Italy | 3 |
| 16 | Lothar Matthäus | (Germany) Bayern Munich | Germany | 3 |
| 21 | Philippe Albert | (England) Newcastle United | Belgium | 2 |
| 21 | Otto Konrad | Austria Salzburg | Austria | 2 |
| 21 | Ciriaco Sforza | (Germany) Kaiserslautern | Switzerland | 2 |
| 24 | Kennet Andersson | (France) Caen | Sweden | 1 |
| 24 | Zvonimir Boban | (Italy) Milan | Croatia | 1 |
| 24 | Martin Dahlin | (Germany) Borussia Mönchengladbach | Sweden | 1 |
| 24 | Pep Guardiola | (Spain) Barcelona | Spain | 1 |
| 24 | Andreas Möller | (Germany) Borussia Dortmund | Germany | 1 |

== Team of the Year ==
Apparently there was also a European Team of the Year chosen at the Ballon d'Or presentation. The team reported by El País was as follows:

| Goalkeeper | Defenders | Midfielders | Forwards |
|---|---|---|---|
| (Sweden) Thomas Ravelli | (France) Marcel Desailly (Italy) Paolo Maldini (Belgium) Philippe Albert | (Sweden) Tomas Brolin (Finland) Jari Litmanen (Bulgaria) Yordan Letchkov (Romania) Gheorghe Hagi (Italy) Roberto Baggio | (Germany) Jürgen Klinsmann (Bulgaria) Hristo Stoichkov |
