= Nedyalko Mladenov =

Bulgarian footballer

Personal information
- Full name: Nedyalko Angelov Mladenov
- Date of birth: 7 August 1961 (age 65)
- Place of birth: Buhovo, Bulgaria
- Height: 1.82 m (6 ft 0 in)
- Position: Defender

Youth career
- CSKA Sofia

Senior career*
Years	Team	Apps	(Gls)
1980–1989	CSKA Sofia	147	(0)
1980–1982	→ Sliven (loan)	52	(1)
1989–1990	Guingamp	22	(0)
1989–1990	Guingamp B	5	(0)
1990–1991	Braga	22	(0)
1991–1992	Botev Plovdiv	4	(0)
- * Club domestic league appearances and goals

Nedyalko Mladenov (Bulgarian: Недялко Младенов; born 7 August 1961) is a former Bulgarian footballer who played as a defender.

== Career ==
Mladenov spent the majority of his playing career with CSKA Sofia, where he won three A Group titles, five Bulgarian Cups and three Cups of the Soviet Army. He captained the team during the 1987–88 season.

After seven seasons at CSKA, Mladenov joined French Ligue 2 side En Avant de Guingamp in 1989. After leaving Guingamp at the end of the 1989–90 season, he signed with Portuguese club Braga, with whom he played 22 games in the Primeira Liga.

== Honours ==
CSKA Sofia

- A Group (3): 1982–83, 1986–87, 1988–89
- Bulgarian Cup (5): 1982–83, 1984–85, 1986–87, 1987–88, 1988–89
- Cup of the Soviet Army (3): 1984–85, 1985–86, 1988–89
