= Rumen Apostolov =

Bulgarian footballer

Personal information
- Full name: Rumen Marinov Apostolov
- Date of birth: 24 August 1963
- Place of birth: Sofia, Bulgaria
- Date of death: 11 August 2002 (aged 38)
- Place of death: Sofia, Bulgaria
- Position: Goalkeeper

Youth career
- 1974–1982: CSKA Sofia

Senior career*
Years	Team	Apps	(Gls)
1983–1984	Bdin Vidin	9	(0)
1984–1987	Spartak Varna	35	(0)
1987–1991	CSKA Sofia	50	(0)
1991–1993	Botev Vratsa		
1993–1994	Shumen		
1994–1995	Lokomotiv Sofia	36	(0)
1996	Spartak Varna	12	(0)
- * Club domestic league appearances and goals

Rumen Marinov Apostolov (Bulgarian: Румен Апостолов; 24 August 1963 – 11 August 2002) was a Bulgarian footballer who played as a goalkeeper.

== Honours ==
CSKA Sofia

- Bulgarian League (2): 1988–89, 1989–90
- Bulgarian Cup (2): 1987–88, 1988–89
- Cup of the Soviet Army (2): 1988–89, 1989–90
- Bulgarian Supercup: 1989

Lokomotiv Sofia

- Bulgarian Cup: 1994–95
