= Ivaylo Kirov =

Bulgarian footballer

Personal information
- Full name: Ivaylo Angelov Kirov
- Date of birth: 30 December 1965 (age 60)
- Place of birth: Shumen, Bulgaria
- Position: Midfielder

Youth career
- Volov Shumen

Senior career*
Years	Team	Apps	(Gls)
1983-1984	Volov Shumen	27	(5)
1984-1990	CSKA Sofia	127	(28)
1991	Lillestrøm SK	16	(1)
1992-1994	CSKA Sofia	60	(7)
1994-1997	Velbazhd Kyustendil	61	(12)
Total		291	(53)

International career
1988-1989	Bulgaria	12	(1)
- * Club domestic league appearances and goals

Ivaylo Angelov Kirov (Bulgarian: Ивайло Ангелов Киров; born 30 December 1965) is a former Bulgarian footballer who played as a midfielder. He earned 12 caps for the Bulgarian national team, scoring one goal.

Born in Shumen, Kirov began his career with local side Volov Shumen. In 1984, he joined CSKA Sofia, where he spent the majority of his playing career. With CSKA Kirov won four A Group titles, five Bulgarian Cups, four Cups of the Soviet Army and one Bulgarian Supercup.

Kirov also played for Norwegian side Lillestrøm SK in the Tippeligaen and Velbazhd Kyustendil.

He was sacked from Lillestrøm after hitting a pedestrian with his car while driving under the influence.

== Honours ==
=== Club ===
CSKA Sofia

- A Group (4): 1986–87, 1988–89, 1989–90, 1991–92
- Bulgarian Cup (5): 1985, 1987, 1988, 1989, 1993
- Cup of the Soviet Army (4): 1985, 1986, 1989, 1990
- Bulgarian Supercup (1): 1989
