= Doncho Donev =

Bulgarian footballer

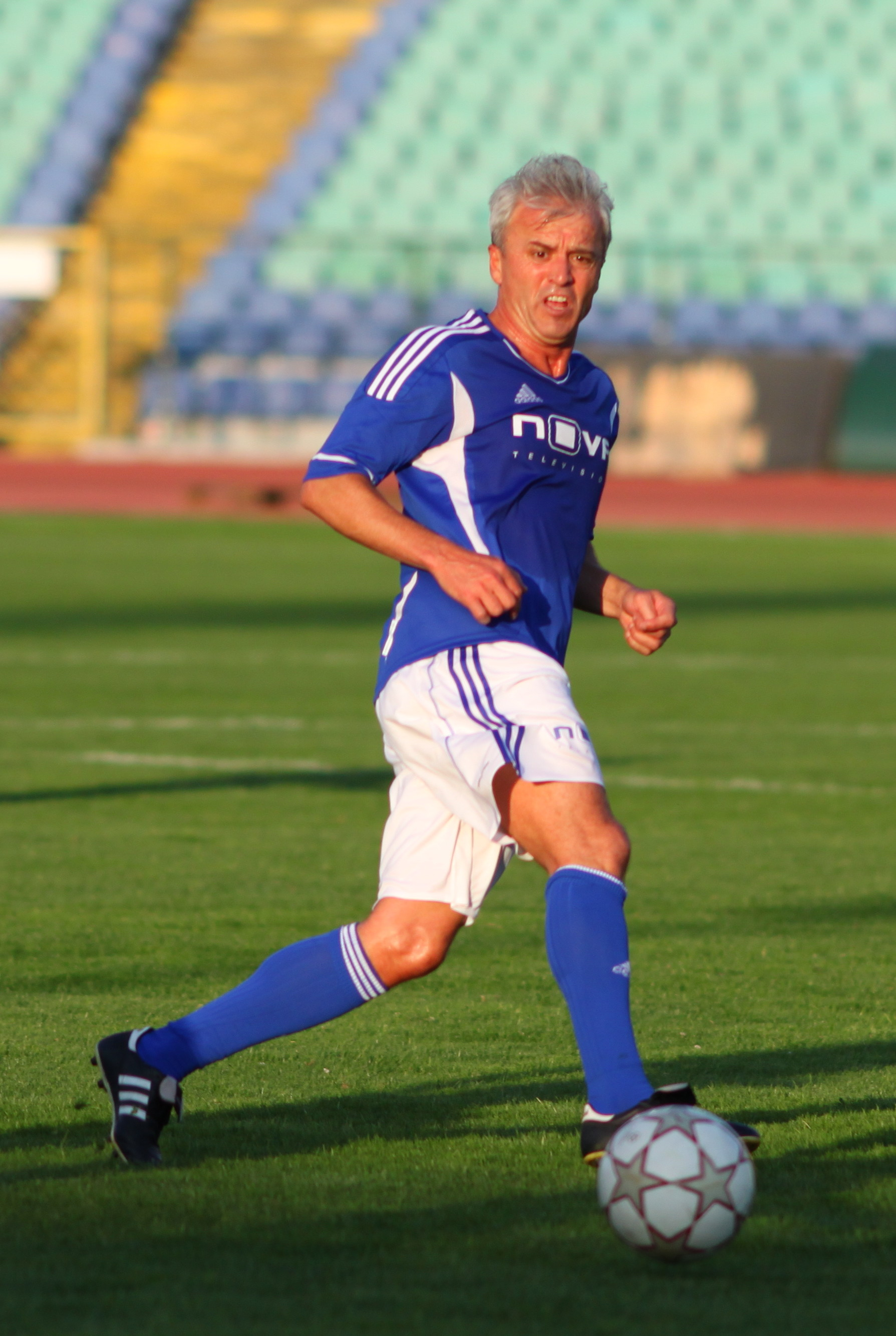
- Donev in 2011

Personal information
- Full name: Doncho Roychev Donev
- Date of birth: 24 January 1967 (age 59)
- Place of birth: Dimitrovgrad, Bulgaria
- Position: Forward

Senior career*
Years	Team	Apps	(Gls)
1985–1987	Dimitrovgrad	26	(2)
1987–1991	CSKA Sofia	66	(9)
1991–1993	Lokomotiv Sofia	57	(13)
1993–1994	Botev Plovdiv	23	(5)
1994–1995	Lokomotiv Sofia	25	(5)
1996	Levski Sofia	14	(5)
1996–1997	Sarıyer	32	(9)
1997	Vanspor	10	(2)
1998	Levski Sofia	25	(15)
1998–1999	Dardanelspor	21	(10)
1999–2000	Denizlispor	53	(15)
2001–2002	Lokomotiv Sofia	47	(11)
2002–2003	Lokomotiv Plovdiv	18	(9)
2003–2005	Lokomotiv Sofia	48	(15)

International career
1992–1998	Bulgaria	3	(0)
- * Club domestic league appearances and goals

Doncho Roychev Donev (Bulgarian: Дончо Ройчев Донев; born 24 January 1967) is a retired Bulgarian professional footballer who played as a forward for several clubs and the Bulgarian national team. Donev is the current president of the Bulgarian Football Players' Association.

== Career ==
Donev began his career playing for FC Dimitrovgrad, before spells with CSKA Sofia, Lokomotiv Sofia and Levski Sofia. In August 1996, he moved to Turkey to play for Sarıyer G.K., Vanspor, Çanakkale Dardanelspor and Denizlispor in the Süper Lig.

Donev received three caps for the Bulgaria national football team, first appearing in a friendly against Turkey on 26 August 1992.

== Honours ==
=== Club ===
CSKA Sofia

- Bulgarian A Group (2): 1988–89, 1989–90
- Bulgarian Cup (2): 1987–88, 1988–89
- Cup of the Soviet Army (2): 1988–89, 1989–90

Lokomotiv Sofia

- Bulgarian Cup: 1994–95

Levski Sofia

- Bulgarian Cup: 1997–98
