= 1987–88 Bulgarian Cup =

Tournament details
- Country: Bulgaria

Final positions
- Champions: CSKA Sofia (13th cup)
- Runners-up: Levski Sofia

Tournament statistics
- Top goal scorer(s): P. Aleksandrov (Slavia); N. Petrunov (Pirin); Stoyanov (Chernomorets); S. Draganov (Loko Pd) (5 goals each)

The 1987–88 Bulgarian Cup was the 48th season of the Bulgarian Cup. CSKA Sofia won the competition, beating Levski Sofia 4–1 in the final at the Vasil Levski National Stadium in Sofia.

== First round ==
=== Group 1 ===
Team 1	Agg.	Team 2	1st leg	2nd leg
19 August / 2 September 1987
Pirin Blagoevgrad	5–1	Marek Dupnitsa	4–0	1–1
Botev Vratsa	4–1	Vihren Sandanski	4–1	0–0
30 September / 7 October 1987
Pirin Blagoevgrad	3–1	Botev Vratsa	2–0	1–1
Vihren Sandanski	1–3	Marek Dupnitsa	1–0	0–3

- Vihren Sandanski was eliminated.

=== Group 2 ===
Team 1	Agg.	Team 2	1st leg	2nd leg
19 August / 2 September 1987
Slavia Sofia	2–1	Hebar Pazardzhik	1–0	1–1
Minyor Pernik	5–1	Balkan Botevgrad	3–0	2–1
30 September / 7 October 1987
Minyor Pernik	3–5	Slavia Sofia	2–3	1–2
Balkan Botevgrad	2–0	Hebar Pazardzhik	2–0	0–0

- Hebar Pazardzhik was eliminated.

=== Group 3 ===
Team 1	Agg.	Team 2	1st leg	2nd leg
19 August / 2 September 1987
Spartak Pleven	2–4	Bdin Vidin	2–1	0–3
Litex Lovech	2–5	Yantra Gabrovo	0–2	2–3
30 September / 7 October 1987
Yantra Gabrovo	0–2	Bdin Vidin	0–0	0–2
Litex Lovech	2–6	Spartak Pleven	1–0	1–6

- Litex Lovech was eliminated.

=== Group 4 ===
Team 1	Agg.	Team 2	1st leg	2nd leg
19 August / 2 September 1987
Etar Veliko Tarnovo	2–1	Dobrudzha Dobrich	2–0	0–1
Dunav Ruse	2–3	Akademik Svishtov	1–1	1–2
30 September / 7 October 1987
Etar Veliko Tarnovo	8–1	Akademik Svishtov	4–1	4–0
Dunav Ruse	5–2	Dobrudzha Dobrich	2–1	3–1

- Dobrudzha Dobrich was eliminated.

=== Group 5 ===
Team 1	Agg.	Team 2	1st leg	2nd leg
19 August / 2 September 1987
Lokomotiv GO	6–5	Ludogorets Razgrad	5–1	1–4
Spartak Varna	2–1	Shumen	2–0	0–1
30 September / 7 October 1987
Spartak Varna	4–2	Lokomotiv GO	4–1	0–1
Ludogorets Razgrad	2–4	Shumen	1–1	1–3

- Ludogorets Razgrad was eliminated.

=== Group 6 ===
Team 1	Agg.	Team 2	1st leg	2nd leg
19 August / 2 September 1987
Chernomorets Burgas	3–2	Tundzha Yambol	2–0	1–2 (aet)
Rozova Dolina	3–1	Cherno More Varna	3–1	0–0
30 September / 7 October 1987
Chernomorets Burgas	7–2	Rozova Dolina	2–0	5–2
Tundzha Yambol	2–3	Cherno More Varna	2–1	0–2

- Tundzha Yambol was eliminated.

=== Group 7 ===
Team 1	Agg.	Team 2	1st leg	2nd leg
19 August / 2 September 1987
Lokomotiv Plovdiv	5–3	Arda Kardzhali	5–1	0–2
Haskovo	(a)3–3	Neftochimic Burgas	2–0	1–3 (aet)
30 September / 7 October 1987
Lokomotiv Plovdiv	8–3	Haskovo	2–0	6–3
Arda Kardzhali	3–1	Neftochimic Burgas	2–0	1–1

- Neftochimic Burgas was eliminated.

=== Group 8 ===
Team 1	Agg.	Team 2	1st leg	2nd leg
19 August / 2 September 1987
Beroe Stara Zagora	9–2	Dimitrovgrad	6–1	3–1
Sliven	3–2	Spartak Plovdiv	2–0	1–2
30 September / 7 October 1987
Sliven	3–2	Beroe Stara Zagora	2–0	1–2 (aet)
Dimitrovgrad	2–3	Spartak Plovdiv	2–0	0–3

- Dimitrovgrad was eliminated.

== Second round ==
Team 1	Agg.	Team 2	1st leg	2nd leg
29 November / 12 December 1987
Dunav Ruse	0–3	Chernomorets Burgas	0–1	0–2
Cherno More Varna	5–3	Bdin Vidin	4–1	1–2
Pirin Blagoevgrad	3–1	Etar Veliko Tarnovo	3–0	0–1
Lokomotiv Plovdiv	4–1	Marek Dupnitsa	4–0	0–1
Rozova Dolina	2–3	Shumen	2–1	0–2
Slavia Sofia	4–1	Minyor Pernik	4–0	0–1
Yantra Gabrovo	3–4	Arda Kardzhali	3–1	0–3
Beroe Stara Zagora	3–3 (a)	Spartak Varna	2–2	1–1
Lokomotiv GO	2–4	Spartak Plovdiv	2–0	0–4
Akademik Svishtov	3–3 (a)	Haskovo	3–1	0–2
Botev Vratsa	3–1	Spartak Pleven	1–0	2–1
Sliven	1–1 (a)	Balkan Botevgrad	1–1	0–0

== Third round ==
In this round include the four teams, who participated in the European tournaments (CSKA, Levski, Botev Plovdiv and Lokomotiv Sofia)

Team 1	Score	Team 2
23 December 1987
Lokomotiv Sofia	0–3	Slavia Sofia
Levski Sofia	5–0	Botev Vratsa
Spartak Plovdiv	0–2 (a.e.t.)	CSKA Sofia
Botev Plovdiv	3–0	Lokomotiv Plovdiv
Chernomorets Burgas	2–0	Shumen
Spartak Varna	3–0	Arda Kardzhali
Pirin Blagoevgrad	2–1	Haskovo
Cherno More Varna	5–0	Balkan Botevgrad

== Quarter-finals ==
Team 1	Score	Team 2
February 1988
Pirin Blagoevgrad	1–0	Cherno More Varna
CSKA Sofia	2–1	Botev Plovdiv
Levski Sofia	3–1	Spartak Varna
Chernomorets Burgas	0–1	Slavia Sofia

== Semi-finals ==
9 March 1988

CSKA Sofia	1−0	Slavia Sofia
Kostadinov 5'

Vasil Levski National Stadium, Sofia
9 March 1988

Levski Sofia	1−0	Pirin Blagoevgrad
Kurdov 87'

Georgi Benkovski Stadium, Pazardzhik

== Third place play-off ==
10 May 1988

Pirin Blagoevgrad	5−2 (a.e.t.)	Slavia Sofia

Minyor Stadium, Pernik

== Final ==
=== Details ===
11 May 1988

Levski Sofia	1−4	CSKA Sofia
Iliev 13'		Stoichkov 6'; Penev 41' (pen.); Vitanov 85', 89'

Vasil Levski National Stadium, Sofia
Attendance: 50,000
Referee: Velichko Tsonchev (Veliko Tarnovo)

Levski	CSKA
