= Marius Urukov =

Bulgarian footballer

Personal information
- Full name: Marius Vasilev Urukov
- Date of birth: 24 June 1967 (age 59)
- Place of birth: Milkovitsa, Pleven Province, Bulgaria
- Height: 1.91 m (6 ft 3 in)
- Position: Defender

Senior career*
Years	Team	Apps	(Gls)
1985–1989	Spartak Pleven	52	(3)
1989–1991	CSKA Sofia	53	(2)
1991–1992	Lokomotiv Sofia	22	(0)
1992–1993	CSKA Sofia	12	(1)
1993–1994	Shumen	14	(1)
1994–1999	Slavia Sofia	119	(12)
2001	Septemvri Sofia	12	(0)

International career
	Bulgaria	8	(0)
- * Club domestic league appearances and goals

Marius Urukov (Bulgarian: Мариус Уруков; born 24 June 1967) is a former Bulgarian footballer who played as a defender.

== Career ==
Urukov spent his entire professional career in Bulgaria, mainly playing in the top division of Bulgarian football. He had two spells with powerhouse CSKA Sofia, but his football path is most frequently associated with Slavia Sofia, where he is considered to be among the top players in the club's history.
