= Simeon Chilibonov =

Bulgarian footballer

Personal information
- Full name: Simeon Iliev Chilibonov
- Date of birth: 22 June 1966 (age 60)
- Place of birth: Pomorie, Bulgaria
- Positions: Midfielder; forward

Senior career*
Years	Team	Apps	(Gls)
1983–1986	Naftex Burgas	104	(32)
1986–1991	Chernomorets Burgas	145	(32)
1991–1992	VfB Lübeck	20	(8)
1992	Dobrudzha	9	(3)
1993	Shumen	6	(2)
1993	Dobrudzha	14	(9)
1994	Slavia Sofia	24	(9)
1995–1997	Lokomotiv Sofia	45	(16)
1997	Vanspor	4	(1)
1997–1998	Slavia Sofia	30	(9)
1999	Lokomotiv Sofia	14	(3)
2000	Naftex Burgas	8	(1)
2000	Kameno	12	(5)
2000	Hebar Pazardzhik		
2001	Slanchev Bryag	11	(2)

International career
	Bulgaria	2	(0)

Managerial career
- 2005–2006: Chernomorets 919
- * Club domestic league appearances and goals

Simeon Chilibonov (Bulgarian: Симеон Чилибонов) (born 22 June 1966) is a retired Bulgarian footballer.

== Career ==
Coming through the youth ranks of OFC Pomorie, Chilibonov spent almost his entire career in Bulgaria, mainly playing in the top division of Bulgarian football. In the 1990s, he also had short spells in Germany and Turkey. At a ceremony in December 2013, which commemorated 100 years since the founding of Slavia Sofia, Chilibonov received a prize as one of the most distinguished players in the club's history.
