= Emil Kostadinov =

Bulgarian footballer (born 1967)

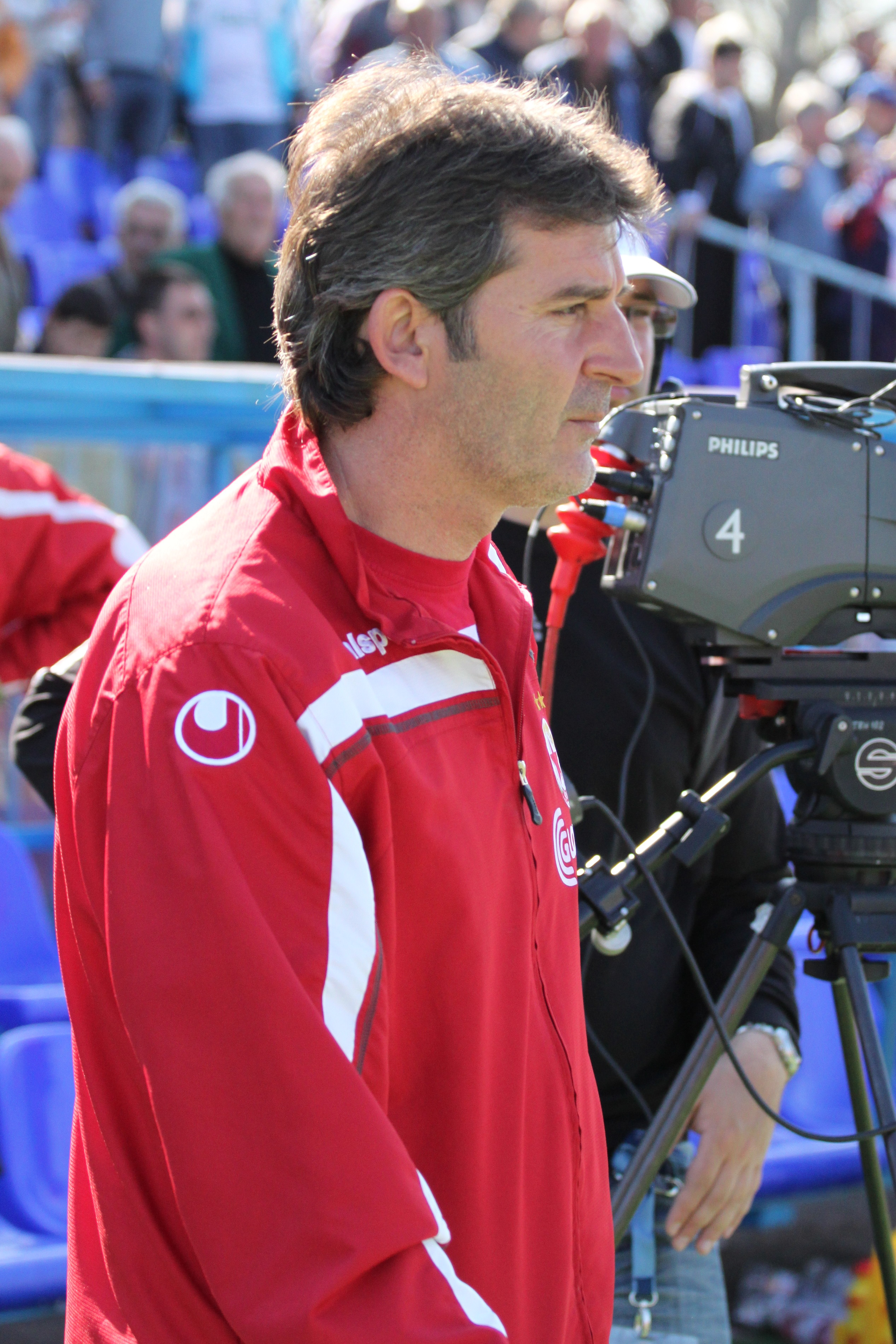
- Kostadinov in 2010

Personal information
- Full name: Emil Lyubchov Kostadinov
- Date of birth: 12 August 1967 (age 59)
- Place of birth: Sofia, Bulgaria
- Height: 1.77 m (5 ft 10 in)
- Positions: Striker; winger

Senior career*
Years	Team	Apps	(Gls)
1985–1990	CSKA Sofia	119	(36)
1990–1994	Porto	114	(43)
1995	Deportivo La Coruña	9	(2)
1995–1996	Bayern Munich	27	(7)
1996–1997	Fenerbahçe	25	(11)
1997	UANL	9	(2)
1998	CSKA Sofia	11	(7)
1998–1999	Mainz 05	4	(1)
Total		322	(114)

International career
1986–1988	Bulgaria U21	23	(8)
1988–1998	Bulgaria	70	(27)
- * Club domestic league appearances and goals

Emil Lyubchov Kostadinov (Bulgarian: Емил Любчов Костадинов; born 12 August 1967) is a Bulgarian former professional footballer who played as a forward and represented the Bulgaria national team at two World Cups.

== Club career ==
Born in Sofia, Kostadinov began his professional career with CSKA Sofia in 1985. In the late 1980s, he formed part of the team's attacking line alongside Hristo Stoichkov and Lyuboslav Penev, contributing to the club's Bulgarian championship titles in 1986–87 and 1988–89, as well as Bulgarian Cup victories in 1986–87, 1987–88, and 1988–89. He also played in European competitions, including the European Cup and UEFA Cup.

In 1990, he moved to Portugal to join Porto. At Porto, he won the Primeira Liga in 1991–92, 1992–93, and 1994–95, as well as the Taça de Portugal in 1990–91 and the Supertaça Cândido de Oliveira in 1991. He remained with Porto until 1994 and was also one of the team's main attacking players in European competitions.

In 1994, he moved to Spanish club Deportivo de La Coruña, where he scored 2 goals in 9 appearances. In January 1995, he moved to German club Bayern Munich. He played for Bayern during the second half of the 1994–95 season and the 1995–96 season, winning the 1995–96 UEFA Cup. In particular, he scored in the 21st minute of the second half in the second leg of the final against Bordeaux, contributing to Bayern's 3–1 victory.

In the 1996–97 season, he played for Turkish club Fenerbahçe, before moving to Mexico to join UANL. In the 1997–98 season, he returned to his former club CSKA Sofia, and in 1998 he joined Mainz. He played for Mainz during the 1998–99 and 1999–2000 seasons before ending his playing career in 2000.

== International career ==
Kostadinov first appeared on the international stage with the Bulgaria youth national team at the 1985 FIFA World Youth Championship, scoring two goals. Bulgaria reached the quarter-finals of the tournament, where Kostadinov scored against Spain. He subsequently represented the Bulgaria national team from 1988 to 1998, making 70 international appearances and scoring 27 goals.

In the 1994 FIFA World Cup European qualifiers, he made his international breakthrough by scoring twice against the France. On 17 November 1993, in a match played in Paris, Kostadinov scored in the 37th minute and again in the final minute of the match to give Bulgaria a 2–1 victory. The result allowed Bulgaria to overtake France and qualify for the 1994 FIFA World Cup.

At the 1994 FIFA World Cup, he led Bulgaria's attack alongside Hristo Stoichkov, helping the team reach the semi-finals. Kostadinov appeared in all seven of Bulgaria's matches at the tournament but did not score. In the semi-final against the Italy, he claimed that he had been fouled by Alessandro Costacurta in the penalty area. A subsequent handball incident involving Costacurta also occurred, but no penalty was awarded. At the time, there was controversy in Bulgaria over the decisions of French referee Joël Quiniou, with some questioning his nationality because Bulgaria had eliminated France from the World Cup qualifiers in 1993. Contemporary reports, however, also differed over whether Costacurta's handball had been deliberate. Bulgaria lost 2–1 to Italy and failed to reach the final.

Kostadinov also represented Bulgaria at UEFA Euro 1996. He started in the group-stage match against Spain, with Bulgaria drawing 1–1. Bulgaria subsequently failed to advance from the group stage and did not reach the quarter-finals.

Kostadinov also participated in the 1998 FIFA World Cup. He scored Bulgaria's only goal of the group stage in the match against Spain. On 24 June 1998, he scored in the 58th minute, although Bulgaria lost 6–1 to Spain. Bulgaria recorded one draw and two defeats in the group stage and failed to advance to the round of 16. Kostadinov subsequently retired from international football before the UEFA Euro 2000 qualifiers.

=== International goals ===
Scores and results list Bulgaria's goal tally first, score column indicates score after each Kostadinov goal.

List of international goals scored by Emil Kostadinov
No.	Date	Venue	Opponent	Score	Result	Competition
1	24 December 1988	Sharjah Stadium, Sharjah, United Arab Emirates	United Arab Emirates	1–0	1–0	Friendly match
2	21 February 1989	Vasil Levski National Stadium, Sofia, Bulgaria	Soviet Union	1–0	1–2	Friendly match
3	5 May 1990	Estádio Brinco de Ouro da Princesa, Campinas, Brazil	Brazil	1–1	1–2	Friendly match
4	27 March 1991	Hampden Park, Glasgow, Scotland	Scotland	1–1	1–1	Euro 1992 qualifier
5	1 May 1991	Vasil Levski National Stadium, Sofia, Bulgaria	Switzerland	1–0	2–3	Euro 1992 qualifier
6	25 September 1991	Vasil Levski National Stadium, Sofia, Bulgaria	Italy	1–0	2–1	Friendly match
7	28 April 1992	Wankdorf Stadium, Bern, Switzerland	Switzerland	2–0	2–0	Friendly match
8	14 May 1992	Olympiastadion, Helsinki, Finland	Finland	2–0	3–0	1994 World Cup qualifier
9	14 May 1992	Olympiastadion, Helsinki, Finland	Finland	3–0	3–0	1994 World Cup qualifier
10	17 November 1993	Parc des Princes, Paris, France	France	1–1	2–1	1994 World Cup qualifier
11	17 November 1993	Parc des Princes, Paris, France	France	2–1	2–1	1994 World Cup qualifier
12	12 October 1994	Vasil Levski National Stadium, Sofia, Bulgaria	(Georgia (country)) Georgia	1–0	2–0	Euro 1996 qualifier
13	12 October 1994	Vasil Levski National Stadium, Sofia, Bulgaria	(Georgia (country)) Georgia	2–0	2–0	Euro 1996 qualifier
14	16 November 1994	Vasil Levski National Stadium, Sofia, Bulgaria	Moldova	4–1	4–1	Euro 1996 qualifier
15	14 December 1994	Cardiff Arms Park, Cardiff, Wales	Wales	2–0	3–0	Euro 1996 qualifier
16	7 June 1995	Vasil Levski National Stadium, Sofia, Bulgaria	Germany	3–2	3–2	Euro 1996 qualifier
17	7 October 1995	Vasil Levski National Stadium, Sofia, Bulgaria	Albania	2–0	3–0	Euro 1996 qualifier
18	7 October 1995	Vasil Levski National Stadium, Sofia, Bulgaria	Albania	3–0	3–0	Euro 1996 qualifier
19	28 May 1996	Vasil Levski National Stadium, Sofia, Bulgaria	(North Macedonia) Macedonia	1–0	3–0	Friendly match
20	8 October 1996	Stade Josy Barthel, Luxembourg City, Luxembourg	Luxembourg	2–1	2–1	1998 World Cup qualifier
21	8 November 1996	Supachalasai National Stadium, Bangkok, Thailand	Thailand	3–0	4-0	Friendly match
22	14 December 1996	Tsirio Stadium, Limassol, Cyprus	Cyprus	1–0	3–1	1998 World Cup qualifier
23	2 April 1997	Vasil Levski National Stadium, Sofia, Bulgaria	Cyprus	2–0	4–1	1998 World Cup qualifier
24	2 April 1997	Vasil Levski National Stadium, Sofia, Bulgaria	Cyprus	3–0	4–1	1998 World Cup qualifier
25	8 June 1997	Neftochimik Stadium, Bourgas, Bulgaria	Luxembourg	2–0	4–0	1998 World Cup qualifier
26	11 October 1997	Luzhniki Stadium, Moscow, Russia	Russia	2–4	2–4	1998 World Cup qualifier
27	24 June 1998	Stade Félix Bollaert, Lens, France	Spain	1–3	1–6	1998 World Cup

== Honours ==
CSKA Sofia

- Bulgarian A PFG: 1986–87, 1988–89, 1989–90
- Bulgarian Cup: 1986–87, 1987–88, 1988–89
- Cup of the Soviet Army: 1985-86, 1988-89, 1989–90
- Bulgarian Supercup: 1989

Porto

- Primeira Liga: 1991–92, 1992–93, 1994–95
- Taça de Portugal: 1990–91, 1993–94
- Supertaça Cândido de Oliveira: 1990, 1991, 1993, 1994

Bayern Munich

- UEFA Cup: 1995–96

Bulgaria

- FIFA World Cup: 4th place: 1994
