= Preslav Getov =

Bulgarian footballer

Personal information
- Date of birth: 3 April 1965 (age 61)
- Place of birth: Bulgaria
- Position: Forward

Youth career
- CSKA Sofia

Senior career*
| Years | Team | Apps | (Gls) |
| 1987–1988 | Dimitrovgrad | | |
| 1988–1989 | Etar | | |
| 1989–1990 | Levski Sofia | 14 | (4) |
| 1990–1991 | Portimonense | | |
| 1991–1992 | Etar | | |
| 1992 | SV Lurup | | |
| 1992–1993 | Yantra Gabrovo | | |
| 1993–1994 | Volov Shumen | | |
| 1995–1996 | Chaves | | |
| 1996 | Spartak Varna | | |
- * Club domestic league appearances and goals

Preslav Getov (Bulgarian: Преслав Гетов) (born 3 April 1965) is a Bulgarian former professional footballer who played as a forward.

== Career ==
A tall and powerfully built forward, Getov made his first steps in football as a member of the youth ranks of CSKA Sofia. Between 1989 and 1990, he appeared in 14 Bulgarian league matches for their archrivals Levski Sofia, netting 4 times.
