= Sasho Borisov =

Bulgarian footballer

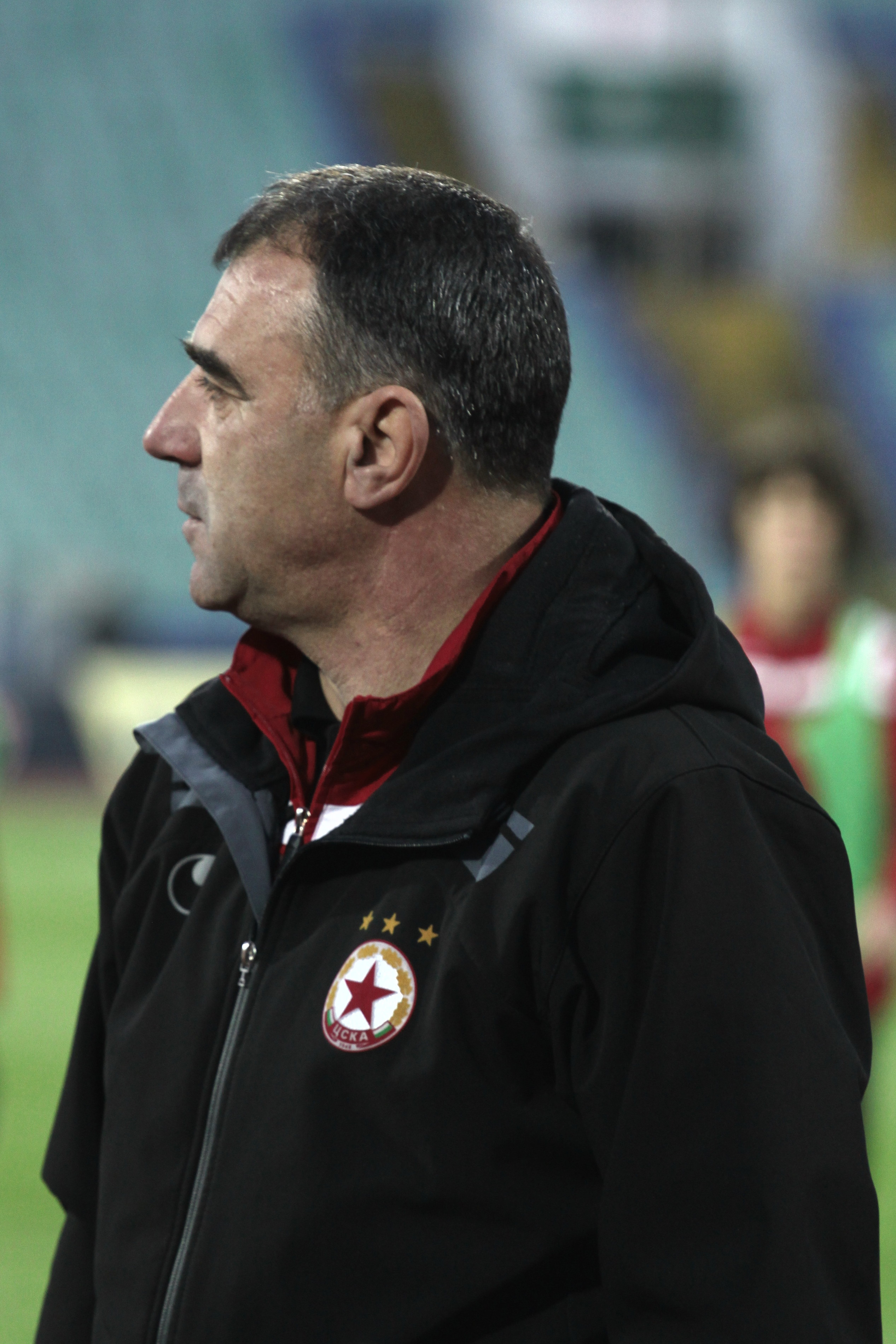

Personal information
- Full name: Sasho Borisov Hristov
- Date of birth: 22 July 1955 (age 71)
- Place of birth: Radomir, Bulgaria
- Position: Centre back

Senior career*
Years	Team	Apps	(Gls)
1971–1973	Strumska Slava Radomir		
1973–1975	Velbazhd Kyustendil		
1975–1977	Minyor Pernik		
1977–1982	Akademik Sofia		
1982–1986	ZhSK Spartak Varna		
1986–1988	Sredets Sofia	49	(0)
1988–1989	Minyor Pernik	10	(0)
1989–1990	Septemvri Sofia		
1990	Mosta	3	(0)
1991–1993	Mqabba Ħajduks	52	(4)
1994–1995	Haskovo		

International career
1983–1984	Bulgaria	10	(0)
1983-1984	Bulgaria XI	3	(0)
- * Club domestic league appearances and goals

Sasho Borisov Hristov (Bulgarian: Сашо Борисов Христов; born 22 July 1955) is a Bulgarian retired football player. Borisov played as a defender.

On the club level, Borisov most notably played for Minyor Pernik, Akademik Sofia, ZhSK Spartak Varna and Sredets Sofia. He also had a spell abroad with Maltese sides Mosta and Mqabba Ħajduks.

After retiring as a player, he has worked as an assistant manager at CSKA Sofia.

== International career ==
Borisov made his debut for Bulgaria in a March 1983 friendly match against Switzerland and earned a total of 13 caps (3 unofficial) in which he did not score a goal. His final international was an October 1984 friendly away against Turkey.
