= Hristo Stoichkov =

Bulgarian footballer (born 1966)

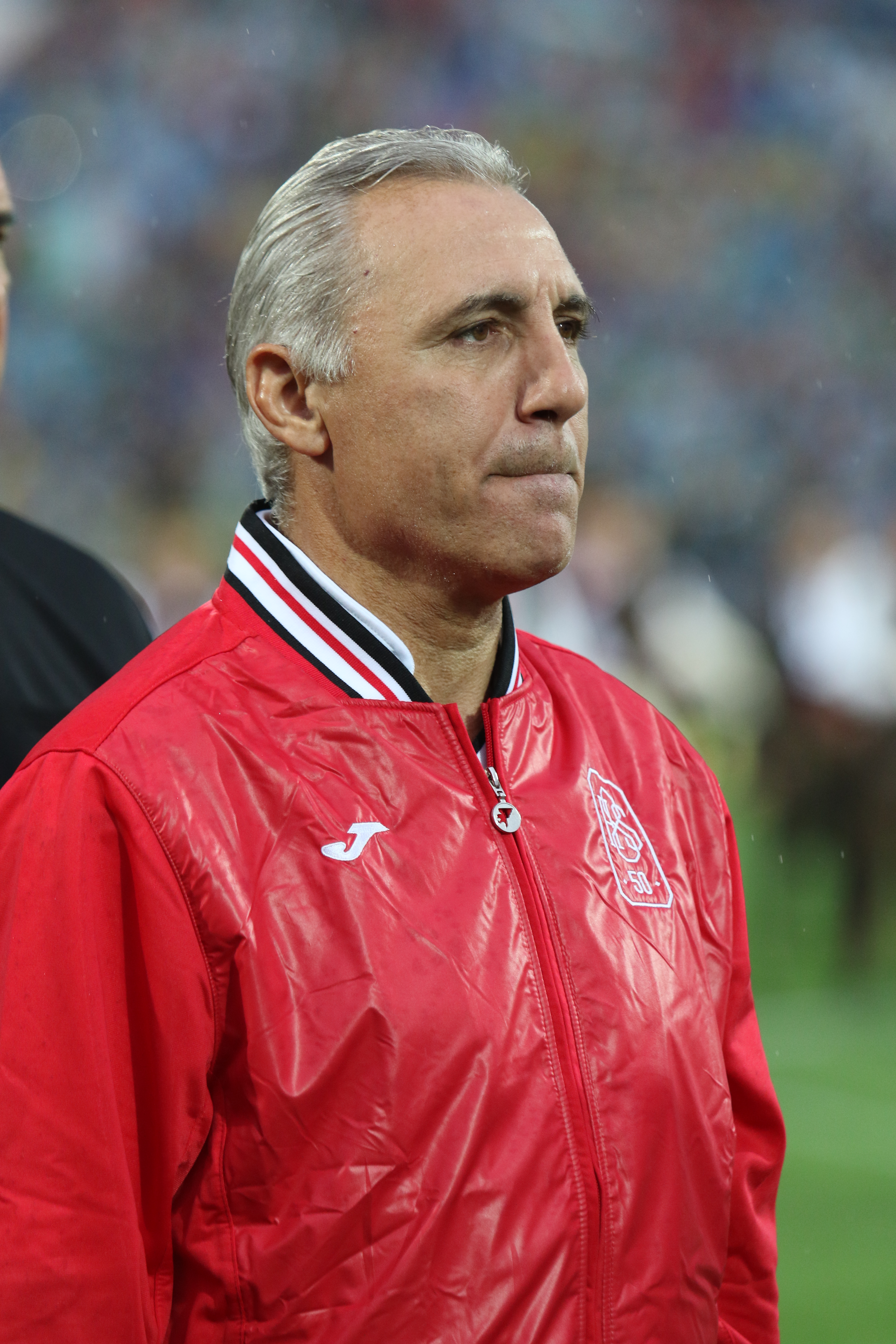
- Stoichkov in 2016

Personal information
- Full name: Hristo Stoichkov Stoichkov
- Date of birth: 8 February 1966 (age 60)
- Place of birth: Plovdiv, Bulgaria
- Height: 1.78 m (5 ft 10 in)
- Position: Forward

Youth career
- 1976–1981: Maritsa Plovdiv

Senior career*
Years	Team	Apps	(Gls)
1981–1982	FC Yuri Gagarin	16	(3)
1982–1983	Hebros Harmanli	32	(14)
1984–1990	CSKA Sofia	119	(81)
1990–1995	Barcelona	151	(76)
1995–1996	Parma	23	(5)
1996–1998	Barcelona	24	(7)
1997–1998	→ CSKA Sofia (loan)	4	(2)
1998	Al-Nassr	2	(1)
1998–1999	Kashiwa Reysol	27	(12)
2000–2002	Chicago Fire	51	(17)
2003	D.C. United	21	(5)
Total		456	(221)

International career
1986–1987	Bulgaria U21	17	(8)
1986–1999	Bulgaria	83	(37)

Managerial career
- 2004–2007: Bulgaria
- 2007: Celta Vigo
- 2009–2010: Mamelodi Sundowns
- 2012–2013: Litex Lovech
- 2013: CSKA Sofia
- * Club domestic league appearances and goals

Hristo Stoichkov Stoichkov (Bulgarian: Христо Стоичков pronounced [ˈxristo stoˈitʃkof]; born 8 February 1966) is a Bulgarian former professional footballer and current football commentator for TUDN. A prolific forward, he is widely regarded as the greatest Bulgarian footballer of all time. He was the runner-up for the FIFA World Player of the Year award in 1992 and 1994 and received the Ballon d'Or in 1994. He was also named the BTA Best Balkan Athlete of the Year in 1994. In 2004, Stoichkov was named by Pelé in the FIFA 100 list of the world's greatest living players.

At the club level, Stoichkov spent six years at CSKA Sofia and became the top goalscorer in Europe in 1990, receiving the European Golden Shoe. In 1990, he joined Barcelona, where he earned the Spanish nickname "El Pistolero" (lit. 'The Gunslinger') and was part of Johan Cruyff's "Dream Team", which won four consecutive La Liga titles and the 1992 European Cup. During his time at the club, he formed a prolific strike partnership with Romário. Cruyff played a crucial role in bringing him to Barcelona, where he quickly developed into one of the most prolific forwards in the world.

Stoichkov was a member of the Bulgaria national team that finished fourth at the 1994 FIFA World Cup, where he emerged as the top scorer with six goals, earning the World Cup Golden Boot. He was ranked as the third-best player at the World Cup, following Romário and Roberto Baggio, and received the World Cup Bronze Ball. In addition to his exceptional footballing talent, he was known for his fiery temperament on the pitch. During his playing career, he was also nicknamed The Dagger (Камата).

== Club career ==
=== Early career ===
Stoichkov was born in the city of Plovdiv.

Stoichkov began his football career playing for his hometown club Maritsa Plovdiv at the age of 11. In 1982, he transferred to Hebros Harmanli, where he scored 14 goals in the third level of Bulgarian football.

=== CSKA Sofia ===
In early 1985, Stoichkov joined CSKA Sofia. At the beginning of his five-year tenure at CSKA, Stoichkov (who later became known for his short temper) was involved in a fight during the 1985 Bulgarian Cup Final, which resulted in an initial lifelong ban that was later reduced to a one-year suspension. He made his comeback for CSKA on 30 April 1986, in a 3–1 away victory over Sliven in a match of the Cup of the Soviet Army. On 21 May, Stoichkov opened the scoring in the tournament final against Lokomotiv Sofia, which CSKA won 2–0.

He continued his progress during the 1986–87 season, becoming a regular on the left side of CSKA's attack. Stoichkov earned his first A Group title winner's medal at the end of the season, scoring 6 league goals.

Stoichkov went on to win the European Golden Boot with CSKA by netting 38 goals in 30 matches during the 1989–90 A Group season.

=== Barcelona ===
After five years with CSKA, Stoichkov transferred to Barcelona. In his first season with the club, Stoichkov was suspended for two months for stomping on a referee's foot, but he still managed to score 14 league goals and an additional six in the European Cup Winners' Cup. He became part of manager Johan Cruyff's "Dream Team" and contributed to one of the most successful eras in the club's history, winning La Liga four consecutive times (from 1991 to 1994) and the European Cup after defeating Sampdoria in the 1992 final. During his time at Barcelona, he became an idol among the club's fans and played alongside Romário in the attack. Stoichkov was also known for ensuring Romário attended training sessions on time, as the latter often indulged in late-night festivities. Stoichkov was twice named runner-up for the FIFA World Player of the Year award, in 1992 and 1994, and he won the 1994 Ballon d'Or after leading his national team to the 1994 World Cup semi-finals.

=== Later career ===
Stoichkov then had a brief spell in Italy with Parma, scoring a total of seven goals, before soon returning to FC Barcelona, where he played until early 1998. He also had a second stint with CSKA Sofia in the spring of 1998. In April 1998, he signed a two-match contract with Saudi Arabian club Al-Nassr, helping them win the Asian Cup Winners' Cup. In the semi-final against Kopetdag, he earned a penalty and assisted the winning goal, and in the final against Suwon Bluewings, he scored the only goal in the 12th minute. For those two games, Hristo received $200,000. He subsequently went to Japan to play with Kashiwa Reysol, before finishing his career in the United States with the Chicago Fire and D.C. United, winning the U.S. Open Cup (and scoring the first goal in the final) with the former.

== International career ==
Stoichkov debuted for the Bulgaria national team in a UEFA Euro 1988 qualifying match against Belgium on 23 September 1987. He scored his first international goal in his fourth appearance, a 3–2 friendly defeat of Qatar in Doha.

During qualification for the 1994 FIFA World Cup, Stoichkov scored five goals, helping Bulgaria qualify for its first major tournament since the 1986 World Cup. At the tournament finals, he was awarded the World Cup Golden Boot as the joint top goal scorer (alongside Oleg Salenko), netting six goals, and he also received the Bronze Ball award. Stoichkov led Bulgaria past Germany in the quarter-finals with a 2–1 shock result, as Germany were the defending champions. In the semi-finals, Bulgaria lost 2–1 to Italy, and they subsequently fell to Sweden in the third-place play-off, losing 4–0.

Bulgaria finished second in the qualifying group for Euro 1996 behind Germany. Stoichkov scored ten goals for his team during the qualifiers, helping Bulgaria qualify as one of the six best runners-up. In the first match against Germany in Sofia, Bulgaria was 2–0 down at half-time. Stoichkov equalized with two penalty goals, and Emil Kostadinov also scored, resulting in a 3–2 victory. Bulgaria lost the second match in Germany 3–1. During the finals, Bulgaria lost 3–1 in the decisive group match against a strong France side; in the other match, Spain defeated Romania 2–1, leading to Bulgaria's elimination. In that tournament, Stoichkov scored three goals in three matches.

He was also part of the squad that was eliminated in the first round of the 1998 World Cup. Bulgaria was not nearly as strong as in previous years, earning only one point from a 0–0 draw against Paraguay and scoring just one goal through Kostadinov in a 6–1 defeat by Spain. Stoichkov retired from international football in 1999 with 37 goals in 83 appearances. His last game was during the Euro 2000 qualification against England, which ended 1–1; Stoichkov assisted Georgi Markov for the equalizing goal from a free kick. In the same game, he was substituted for Martin Petrov, who made his debut in the Bulgarian shirt. Ironically, both are Bulgaria's only goalscorers in a UEFA Euro tournament: Stoichkov was the sole scorer in 1996 with three goals, while Petrov scored in 2004 in the 2–1 loss against Italy. Bulgaria failed to qualify for Euro 2000 in Belgium and the Netherlands after that match, as they needed a win to keep their chances alive.

He later served as coach of the Bulgaria national team from 2004 to April 2007.

== Style of play ==
"That season [1993–1994] Romário and Stoichkov were a force of nature, blowing everyone and everything to bits."

— Football writer Sid Lowe on the strike partnership at Barcelona.

Stoichkov possessed explosive pace and was a creative, tenacious, and prolific left-footed forward. Primarily used as a striker, he was also capable of playing in a creative role or as a second striker, thanks to his ability to provide assists for teammates, forming a strike partnership with Romário at Barcelona. Occasionally, he played as a left winger during his time at the club, although he was also capable of playing on the right. In his early years, he also played as a left full-back. A powerful, physically strong, and technically gifted player, Stoichkov was known for his explosive acceleration, dribbling ability at speed, and his tendency to take unpredictable, powerful shots on goal. As the top goalscorer at the 1994 World Cup, he was also renowned for his prowess at taking free kicks and penalties, and he was also an excellent crosser and passer of the ball. Manager Dimitar Dimitrov described Stoichkov as "one of the greatest players of all time" in 2006 and as a player who had "a winning mentality".

Stoichkov faced criticism for his work rate at times, and he gained a reputation for his aggressive temperament on the pitch despite his evident talent. He could frequently be seen arguing with referees and opponents alike. During Euro 1996, after Bulgaria's final group stage match against France, Stoichkov was accused by French defender Marcel Desailly of making insulting remarks regarding Desailly's race. Throughout his playing career, Stoichkov was often referred to by the nickname The Dagger (Камата).

In 2006, Stoichkov was sued by a former American University student whose leg he broke with a violent tackle during a friendly match for D.C. United in 2003. The case was settled out of court in 2007 with undisclosed financial terms. The student's coach described Stoichkov's challenge as "criminal". Ray Hudson, who was the coach of D.C. United at the time, referred to it as a "rash tackle". Following an investigation by Major League Soccer (MLS), Stoichkov received a two-game suspension and a fine of US$2,000.

== Managerial career ==
In the 2003–04 season, Stoichkov began his managerial career as a forward coach at Barcelona. Following the resignation of Bulgarian national team manager Plamen Markov after the team's first-round exit from UEFA Euro 2004, Stoichkov was appointed as the new national team manager on July 15, 2004. However, his tenure as manager got off to a rocky start, as he failed to lead Bulgaria to qualification for the 2006 FIFA World Cup. Stoichkov's fiery temperament, which had characterized his playing days, carried over into his coaching style. This led to several proven players quitting the national team due to personal conflicts with him. A notable incident occurred on September 5, 2005, during a match against Sweden when Stoichkov was sent off for insulting the referee.

The most significant setback in his management came on October 12, 2006, when Stiliyan Petrov, the team captain, announced that he would no longer play for Bulgaria as long as Stoichkov was at the helm. This marked the third player and the second captain to leave the squad due to disagreements with Stoichkov. However, on March 17, 2007, Petrov revealed that he had had a private conversation with Stoichkov, where they were able to resolve their differences, leading to his return to the national team.

On 10 April 2007, the Bulgarian Football Union announced that they had accepted the resignation of Stoichkov from his position with the national team. This decision was a result of the team's poor performance in the ongoing UEFA Euro 2008 qualifying campaign, which was followed by widespread criticism and debate regarding the manager's capabilities. The specific match that intensified pressure on Stoichkov was the 0–0 home draw against Albania, despite the fact that the Bulgarians generally controlled the game and struck the post twice. He had a brief and disappointing tenure as manager at Celta Vigo, where he was dismissed following the team's decline into the lower reaches of the Spanish Second Division.

On 29 June 2009, Stoichkov moved to Mamelodi Sundowns, replacing Henri Michel. On 16 March 2010, he resigned from Mamelodi Sundowns, and the former South Africa national team manager Trott Moloto was appointed caretaker until a full-time replacement could be found.

In 2011, the Vietnam Football Federation invited Stoichkov to become the head manager of the Vietnam national team; however, he declined the position. In the 2011–12 season, he served as an advisor for the Russian club Rostov.

In January 2012, Stoichkov was appointed manager of the Bulgarian side Litex Lovech, replacing Lyuboslav Penev, who left to become the manager of the Bulgaria national team. In May 2013, Stoichkov was recognized as the A PFG Manager of the Season following a vote by professional footballers in the Bulgarian league. In June 2013, he was named the manager of the Bulgarian powerhouse—and former club—CSKA Sofia, but resigned one month later after losing faith in the troubled club.

== Media ==
Stoichkov appears in EA Sports' FIFA video game series, having been included in the FIFA 15 Ultimate Team Legends.

In 2018, Stoichkov published his authorized biography titled "Hristo Stoichkov: The Story". The official unveiling of the autobiography took place in November and was attended by numerous footballers, other sports figures, and former Bulgarian presidents, including Petar Stoyanov, Georgi Parvanov, and Rosen Plevneliev. Notably, former Spanish referee Ildefonso Urízar Azpitarte, who had sent off Stoichkov during the first match of the 1990 Spanish Super Cup final, had the opportunity to symbolically stomp on Stoichkov's foot during the event.

== Personal life ==
Stoichkov is married to Mariana, and they have two daughters: Hristina and Mihaela. During the COVID-19 pandemic, he was one of the public figures in Bulgaria who strongly supported the COVID-19 vaccination campaign and criticized the prevalence of vaccine hesitancy in his country.

== Career statistics ==
=== Club ===
Appearances and goals by club, season and competition
Club	Season	League			National cup (Note: Includes Bulgarian Cup, Copa del Rey, Coppa Italia, Emperor's Cup, U.S. Open Cup)		League cup (Note: Includes J.League Cup)		Continental		Other		Total	
Club	Season	Division	Apps	Goals	Apps	Goals	Apps	Goals	Apps	Goals	Apps	Goals	Apps	Goals
Hebros	1982–83	V Group	11	4			–		–		–		11	4
Hebros	1983–84	V Group	21	10			–		–		–		21	10
Hebros	Total		32	14			–		–		–		32	14
CSKA Sofia	1984–85	A Group	11	0	3	0	–				–		14	0
CSKA Sofia	1985–86	A Group	0	0	2	2	–				–		2	2
CSKA Sofia	1986–87	A Group	25	6	2	0	—		7 (Note: Appearances in UEFA Cup)	1	—		34	7
CSKA Sofia	1987–88	A Group	27	14	4	4	—		7 (Note: Appearances in European Cup)	5	—		38	23
CSKA Sofia	1988–89	A Group	26	23	7	3	—		8 (Note: Appearances in UEFA Cup Winners' Cup)	7	—		41	33
CSKA Sofia	1989–90	A Group	30	38	5	7	—		3	2	1 (Note: Appearance in Bulgarian Supercup)	1	39	48
CSKA Sofia	Total		119	81	23	16	—		25	16	1	1	168	113
Barcelona	1990–91	La Liga	24	14	5	2	—		8	6	1 (Note: Appearance(s) in Supercopa de España)	0	38	22
Barcelona	1991–92	La Liga	32	17	1	1	—		9	4	1	0	43	22
Barcelona	1992–93	La Liga	34	20	4	0	—		5 (Note: Appearances in UEFA Champions League)	0	3 (Note: Two appearances and one goal in Supercopa de España, two appearances and one goal in UEFA Super Cup, one appearance and one goal in Intercontinental Cup)	3	46	23
Barcelona	1993–94	La Liga	34	16	4	0	—		8	7	2	1	48	24
Barcelona	1994–95	La Liga	27	9	2	2	—		8	3	2	3	39	17
Barcelona	Total		151	76	16	5	0	0	36	20	11	7	214	108
Parma	1995–96	Serie A	23	5	2	0	—		5	2	—		30	7
Barcelona	1996–97	La Liga	22	7	4	0	—		7	0	2	1	35	8
Barcelona	1997–98	La Liga	2	0	1	0	—		2	1	1 (Note: Appearance in UEFA Super Cup)	0	6	1
Barcelona	Total		24	7	5	0	0	0	9	1	3	1	41	9
CSKA Sofia	1997–98	A Group	4	2	1	1	—				—		5	3
Al-Nassr	1997–98	Saudi Premier League							2	1	—		2	1
Kashiwa Reysol	1998	J1 League	16	8	1	0	0	0	—		—		17	8
Kashiwa Reysol	1999	J1 League	11	4	0	0	1	1	—		—		12	5
Kashiwa Reysol	Total		27	12	1	0	1	1	—		—		29	13
Chicago Fire	2000	MLS	18	9	3	1					7	4	28	14
Chicago Fire	2001	MLS	17	6	3	2					3	0	23	8
Chicago Fire	2002	MLS	16	2	0	0					3	0	19	2
Chicago Fire	Total		51	17	6	3							70	27
D.C. United	2003	MLS	21	5	3	1					2	0	26	6
Total			452	219	57	26	1	1	77	40	30	13	617	298

=== International ===
Appearances and goals by national team and year
National team	Year	Apps	Goals
Bulgaria	1987	3	0
Bulgaria	1988	12	4
Bulgaria	1989	8	1
Bulgaria	1990	4	0
Bulgaria	1991	3	2
Bulgaria	1992	5	2
Bulgaria	1993	6	4
Bulgaria	1994	11	9
Bulgaria	1995	7	7
Bulgaria	1996	5	5
Bulgaria	1997	4	1
Bulgaria	1998	10	1
Bulgaria	1999	5	1
Total		83	37

Scores and results list Bulgaria's goal tally first, score column indicates score after each Stoichkov goal.

List of international goals scored by Hristo Stoichkov
No.	Date	Venue	Opponent	Score	Result	Competition
1	21 January 1988	Jassim bin Hamad Stadium, Doha, Qatar	Qatar	3–2	3–2	Friendly
2	9 August 1988	Ullevaal Stadion, Oslo, Norway	Norway	1–1	1–1	Friendly
3	24 August 1988	Stadion Hetman, Białystok, Poland	Poland	1–3	2–3	Friendly
4	21 September 1988	Vasil Levski National Stadium, Sofia, Bulgaria	Soviet Union	2–2	2–2	Friendly
5	11 October 1989	Yuri Gagarin Stadium, Varna, Bulgaria	Greece	4–0	4–0	1990 FIFA World Cup qualification
6	25 September 1991	Vasil Levski National Stadium, Sofia, Bulgaria	Italy	2–0	2–1	Friendly
7	16 October 1991	Vasil Levski National Stadium, Sofia, Bulgaria	San Marino	2–0	4–0	UEFA Euro 1992 qualifying
8	19 August 1992	Vasil Levski National Stadium, Sofia, Bulgaria	Mexico	1–1	1–1	Friendly
9	9 September 1992	Vasil Levski National Stadium, Sofia, Bulgaria	France	1–0	2–0	1994 FIFA World Cup qualification
10	28 April 1993	Vasil Levski National Stadium, Sofia, Bulgaria	Finland	1–0	2–0	1994 FIFA World Cup qualification
11	12 May 1993	Vasil Levski National Stadium, Sofia, Bulgaria	Israel	1–0	2–2	1994 FIFA World Cup qualification
12	8 September 1993	Vasil Levski National Stadium, Sofia, Bulgaria	Sweden	1–0	1–1	1994 FIFA World Cup qualification
13	13 October 1993	Vasil Levski National Stadium, Sofia, Bulgaria	Austria	2–0	4–1	1994 FIFA World Cup qualification
14	26 June 1994	Soldier Field, Chicago, United States	Greece	1–0	4–0	1994 FIFA World Cup
15	26 June 1994	Soldier Field, Chicago, United States	Greece	2–0	4–0	1994 FIFA World Cup
16	30 June 1994	Cotton Bowl, Dallas, United States	Argentina	1–0	2–0	1994 FIFA World Cup
17	5 July 1994	Giants Stadium, East Rutherford, United States	Mexico	1–0	1–1 (3–1 p)	1994 FIFA World Cup
18	10 July 1994	Giants Stadium, East Rutherford, United States	Germany	1–1	2–1	1994 FIFA World Cup
19	13 July 1994	Giants Stadium, East Rutherford, United States	Italy	1–2	1–2	1994 FIFA World Cup
20	16 November 1994	Vasil Levski National Stadium, Sofia, Bulgaria	Moldova	1–0	4–1	UEFA Euro 1996 qualifying
21	16 November 1994	Vasil Levski National Stadium, Sofia, Bulgaria	Moldova	3–1	4–1	UEFA Euro 1996 qualifying
22	14 December 1994	Arms Park, Cardiff, Wales	Wales	3–0	3–0	UEFA Euro 1996 qualifying
23	26 April 1995	Stadionul Republican, Chișinău, Moldova	Moldova	2–0	3–0	UEFA Euro 1996 qualifying
24	26 April 1995	Stadionul Republican, Chișinău, Moldova	Moldova	3–0	3–0	UEFA Euro 1996 qualifying
25	7 June 1995	Vasil Levski National Stadium, Sofia, Bulgaria	Germany	1–2	3–2	UEFA Euro 1996 qualifying
26	7 June 1995	Vasil Levski National Stadium, Sofia, Bulgaria	Germany	2–2	3–2	UEFA Euro 1996 qualifying
27	6 September 1995	Qemal Stafa Stadium, Tirana, Albania	Albania	1–0	1–1	UEFA Euro 1996 qualifying
28	11 October 1995	Boris Paichadze National Stadium, Tbilisi, Georgia	Georgia	1–2	1–2	UEFA Euro 1996 qualifying
29	15 November 1995	Olympiastadion, Berlin, Germany	Germany	1–0	1–3	UEFA Euro 1996 qualifying
30	28 May 1996	Vasil Levski National Stadium, Sofia, Bulgaria	Macedonia	2–0	3–0	Friendly
31	2 June 1996	Vasil Levski National Stadium, Sofia, Bulgaria	United Arab Emirates	2–0	4–1	Friendly
32	9 June 1996	Elland Road, Leeds, England	Spain	1–0	1–1	UEFA Euro 1996
33	13 June 1996	St James' Park, Newcastle, England	Romania	1–0	1–0	UEFA Euro 1996
34	18 June 1996	St James' Park, Newcastle, England	France	1–2	1–3	UEFA Euro 1996
35	8 June 1997	Neftochimik Stadium, Burgas, Bulgaria	Luxembourg	1–0	4–0	1998 FIFA World Cup qualification
36	5 June 1998	Vasil Levski National Stadium, Sofia, Bulgaria	Algeria	1–0	2–0	Friendly
—	19 February 1999	Mong Kok Stadium, Mong Kok, Hong Kong	Hong Kong League XI	1–0	3–0	Carlsberg Cup, considered unofficial friendly
37	31 March 1999	Stade Josy Barthel, Luxembourg, Luxembourg	Luxembourg	1–0	2–0	UEFA Euro 2000 qualifying

== Managerial statistics ==
As of 8 July 2013.

Team	From	To	Competition	Record							
Team	From	To	Competition	G	W	D	L	Win %	GF	GA	GD
Bulgaria	15 July 2004	10 April 2007	Competitive	15	6	6	3	40.00	24	20	+4
Bulgaria	15 July 2004	10 April 2007	Friendlies (Note: Includes Kirin Cup)	14	7	5	2	50.00	24	14	+10
Bulgaria	15 July 2004	10 April 2007	Total	29	13	11	5	44.83	48	34	+14
Celta Vigo	April 2007	8 October 2007	League	16	7	1	8	43.75	18	22	–4
Celta Vigo	April 2007	8 October 2007	Copa del Rey	1	0	0	1	0.00	1	2	–1
Celta Vigo	April 2007	8 October 2007	Total	17	7	1	9	41.18	19	24	–5
Mamelodi Sundowns	29 June 2009	16 March 2010	Premier Soccer League	30	16	8	6	53.33	43	24	+19
Mamelodi Sundowns	29 June 2009	16 March 2010	Total	30	16	8	6	53.33	43	24	+19
Litex Lovech	5 January 2012	31 May 2013	Bulgarian A Professional Football Group	46	25	9	12	54.35	89	38	+51
Litex Lovech	5 January 2012	31 May 2013	Bulgarian Cup	8	5	1	2	62.50	14	4	+10
Litex Lovech	5 January 2012	31 May 2013	Total	54	30	10	14	55.56	103	42	+61
CSKA Sofia	5 June 2013	8 July 2013	Bulgarian A Professional Football Group	0	0	0	0	—	0	0	0
CSKA Sofia	5 June 2013	8 July 2013	Total	0	0	0	0	—	0	0	0
Career totals			League	92	48	18	26	52.17	150	84	+66
Career totals			Cup	9	5	1	3	55.56	15	6	+9
Career totals			Competitive	15	6	6	3	40.00	24	20	+4
Career totals			Friendlies	14	7	5	2	50.00	24	14	+10
Career totals			Total	130	66	30	34	50.77	213	124	+89

== Honours ==
=== Player ===
CSKA Sofia

- A Group: 1986–87, 1988–89, 1989–90
- Bulgarian Cup: 1984–85, 1986–87, 1987–88, 1988–89
- Soviet Army Cup: 1984–85, 1985–86, 1988–89, 1989–90
- Bulgarian Supercup: 1989

Barcelona

- La Liga: 1990–91, 1991–92, 1992–93, 1993–94, 1997–98
- Copa del Rey: 1996–97, 1997–98
- Supercopa de España: 1991, 1992, 1994, 1996; runner up: 1990, 1993, 1997
- European Cup/Champions League: 1991–92; runner up: 1993–94
- European/UEFA Cup Winners' Cup: 1996–97; runner up: 1990–91
- UEFA Super Cup: 1992, 1997
- Intercontinental Cup: 1992 (runner up)

Parma

- Supercoppa Italiana: 1995 (runner up)

Al-Nassr

- Asian Cup Winners' Cup: 1997–98

Kashiwa Reysol

- Japan Soccer League Cup / J.League Cup: 1999

Chicago Fire

- U.S. Open Cup: 2000
- Central Division: 2000, 2001
- MLS Cup 2000: Runner-Up

Bulgaria

- FIFA World Cup: 1994 Semi-Finals (4th Place)

Individual

- Ballon d'Or: 1994
- European Golden Shoe: 1990
- European Cup Winners' Cup Top Scorer: 1989
- UEFA Men's Player of the Year Award / Onze d'Or: 1992
- ADN Eastern European Footballer of the Season: 1992, 1994
- Don Balón Award Best Foreign Player in La Liga: 1993-94
- IFFHS World's Top Goal Scorer: 1994
- UEFA Men's Player of the Year Award / Onze d'Argent: 1994
- FIFA World Player of the Year: Runner-Up: 1992, 1994
- FIFA World Cup Golden Shoe: 1994
- FIFA World Cup Bronze Ball: 1994
- FIFA World Cup All-Star Team: 1994
- Bulgarian Footballer of the Year(5): 1989, 1990, 1991, 1992, 1994
- A Group Top Scorer(2): 1988–89, 1989–90
- Bulgarian Sportsperson of the Year: 1994
- BTA Best Balkan Athlete of the Year 1994
- UEFA European Championship Team of the Tournament: 1996
- MLS Best XI: 2000
- The Era of the 'Dream Team' (1988-1996) - Barcelona Legend
- World Soccer's 100 Greatest Players of the 20th Century: 2000
- UEFA Jubilee Awards – Greatest Bulgarian Footballer of the Last 50 Years: 2004
- FIFA 100: 2004
- Golden Foot: 2007, as Football Legend
- Sport Movies & TV – Milano International FICTS Fest - FICTS "Hall of Fame": 2013
- UNESCO Goodwill Ambassador - UNESCO Champion for Sport: 2016
- IFFHS: 2019, as Football Legend
- FourFourTwo - The 50 Greatest Barcelona Players of All Time: 2022
- FourFourTwo - The 100 Best Football Players of All Time: 2022

Records

- All-Time The Only Football Player won Edition of the European Cup Winners' Cup and Asian Cup Winners' Cup.
- All-Time Top Scorer in the Bulgarian First Professional Football League with 38 League Goals in 30 Games - Season 1989–90.
- All-Time FC Barcelona Player with Most Red Cards in the History (11 Red Cards).

=== Manager ===
Mamelodi Sundowns

- Premier Soccer League Runner-Up: 2009–10

Individual

- Premier Soccer League: Coach of the Month: December 2009

=== Further Honours ===
- In November 2003, to celebrate UEFA's Jubilee, he was selected as the Golden Player of Bulgaria by the Bulgarian Football Union as Their Most Outstanding Player of the Past 50 Years.
- In 2011, he was named Honorary Consul of Bulgaria in Barcelona. In October 2017, he was removed from the position on the request of the Spanish Government over His Criticisms of this Government (Especially, the Deputy Prime Minister, Soraya Sáenz de Santamaría), in relation with the Catalan Independence Referendum, as well As the Fact That He Lives Mainly in the United States.

==== Barcelona (Official) ====
1. Copa Generalitat: 1991, 1993
2. Trofeo Ciudad de La Línea: 1991
3. Trofeo Ciudad de Marbella: 1993
4. Teresa Herrera Trophy: 1990, 1993
5. Trofeo Ciudad de Oviedo: 1996
6. Joan Gamper Trophy: 1990, 1991, 1992, 1993, 1994, 1996, 1997

== See also ==
- List of FC Barcelona players
- List of FIFA World Cup top goalscorers
