= 1986–87 Bulgarian Cup =

Tournament details
- Country: Bulgaria

Final positions
- Champions: CSKA Sofia (12th cup)
- Runners-up: Levski Sofia

Tournament statistics
- Top goal scorer(s): P. Aleksandrov (Slavia) (9 goals)

The 1986–87 Bulgarian Cup was the 47th season of the Bulgarian Cup. CSKA Sofia won the competition, beating Levski Sofia 2–1 in the final at the Vasil Levski National Stadium in Sofia.

== First round ==
=== Group 1 ===
Team 1	Agg.	Team 2	1st leg	2nd leg
27 August / 3 September 1986
Dunav Ruse	5–4	Ludogorets Razgrad	3–2	2–2
Spartak Varna	4–1	Svetkavitsa	3–0	1–1
10 / 17 September 1986
Dunav Ruse	3–5	Spartak Varna	3–1	0–4
Ludogorets Razgrad	1–7	Svetkavitsa	1–0	0–7

- Ludogorets Razgrad was eliminated.

=== Group 2 ===
Team 1	Agg.	Team 2	1st leg	2nd leg
27 August / 3 September 1986
Dimitrovgrad	2–2 (a)	Arda Kardzhali	1–0	1–2
Spartak Plovdiv	5–1	Haskovo	5–0	0–1
10 / 17 September 1986
Spartak Plovdiv	4–4 (a)	Dimitrovgrad	3–2	1–2
Arda Kardzhali	3–4	Haskovo	3–2	0–2

- Arda Kardzhali was eliminated.

=== Group 3 ===
Team 1	Agg.	Team 2	1st leg	2nd leg
27 August / 3 September 1986
Cherno More Varna	6–2	Neftochimic Burgas	2–1	4–1
Chernomorets Burgas	2–3	Dobrudzha Dobrich	1–1	1–2
10 / 17 September 1986
Dobrudzha Dobrich	3–2	Cherno More Varna	2–0	1–2
Neftochimic Burgas	6–4	Chernomorets Burgas	3–0	3–4

- Chernomorets Burgas was eliminated.

=== Group 4 ===
Team 1	Agg.	Team 2	1st leg	2nd leg
27 August / 3 September 1986
Botev Vratsa	6–2	Bdin Vidin	4–0	2–2
Spartak Pleven	5–3	Montana	4–2	1–1
10 / 17 September 1986
Botev Vratsa	6–1	Spartak Pleven	4–0	2–1
Bdin Vidin	3–3 (a)	Montana	3–2	0–1

- Bdin Vidin was eliminated.

=== Group 5 ===
Team 1	Agg.	Team 2	1st leg	2nd leg
27 August / 3 September 1986
Slavia Sofia	4–2	Vihren Sandanski	3–0	1–2
Rilski Sportist	5–2	Marek Dupnitsa	5–1	0–1
10 / 17 September 1986
Rilski Sportist	2–7	Slavia Sofia	2–3	0–4
Marek Dupnitsa	6–5	Vihren Sandanski	3–2	3–3

- Vihren Sandanski was eliminated.

=== Group 6 ===
Team 1	Agg.	Team 2	1st leg	2nd leg
27 August / 3 September 1986
Etar Veliko Tarnovo	8–3	Litex Lovech	4–2	4–1
Akademik Svishtov	2–3	Lokomotiv GO	1–1	1–2
10 / 17 September 1986
Etar Veliko Tarnovo	1–0	Lokomotiv GO	1–0	0–0
Akademik Svishtov	4–3	Litex Lovech	3–2	1–1

- Litex Lovech was eliminated.

=== Group 7 ===
Team 1	Agg.	Team 2	1st leg	2nd leg
27 August / 3 September 1986
Sliven	7–3	Rozova Dolina	5–1	2–2
Lokomotiv Plovdiv	4–0	Chirpan	3–0	1–0
10 / 17 September 1986
Sliven	3–2	Lokomotiv Plovdiv	3–0	0–2
Rozova Dolina	4–3	Chirpan	2–1	2–2

- Chirpan was eliminated.

=== Group 8 ===
Team 1	Agg.	Team 2	1st leg	2nd leg
27 August / 3 September 1986
Pirin Blagoevgrad	2–0	Minyor Pernik	2–0	0–0
Lokomotiv Sofia	4–1	Balkan Botevgrad	2–1	2–0
10 / 17 September 1986
Lokomotiv Sofia	6–5	Pirin Blagoevgrad	4–0	2–5
Minyor Pernik	4–1	Balkan Botevgrad	2–1	2–0

- Balkan Botevgrad was eliminated.

== Second round ==
Team 1	Agg.	Team 2	1st leg	2nd leg
1 / 8 October 1986
Botev Vratsa	4–5	Cherno More Varna	4–3	0–2
Haskovo	2–4	Neftochimic Burgas	1–1	1–3
Spartak Pleven	5–3	Dimitrovgrad	4–0	1–3
Pirin Blagoevgrad	3–3 (a)	Lokomotiv Sofia	2–0	1–3
Lokomotiv Plovdiv	10–3	Spartak Plovdiv	7–1	3–2
Minyor Pernik	3–3 (a)	Montana	2–2	1–1
Rozova Dolina	3–1	Rilski Sportist	3–0	0–1
Sliven	5–2	Akademik Svishtov	5–1	0–1
Dunav Ruse	3–3 (a)	Svetkavitsa	2–2	1–1
Slavia Sofia	6–1	Dobrudzha Dobrich	5–0	1–1
Lokomotiv GO	3–2	Etar Veliko Tarnovo	3–0	0–2
Spartak Varna	0–1	Marek Dupnitsa	0–0	0–1

== Third round ==
In this round include the four teams, who participated in the European tournaments (CSKA, Levski, Botev Plovdiv and Beroe)

Team 1	Score	Team 2
9-10 December 1986
Levski Sofia	5–0	Rozova Dolina
Beroe Stara Zagora	0–0 (a.e.t.) (3–1 p)	Pirin Blagoevgrad
Neftochimic Burgas	2–1	Cherno More Varna
Montana	1–2	Slavia Sofia
CSKA Sofia	5–1	Sliven
Lokomotiv GO	4–1	Svetkavitsa
Marek Dupnitsa	3–0	Spartak Pleven
Lokomotiv Plovdiv	3–1 (a.e.t.)	Botev Plovdiv

== Quarter-finals ==
Team 1	Score	Team 2
11-25 February 1987
CSKA Sofia	2–1	Slavia Sofia
Lokomotiv GO	5–1	Beroe Stara Zagora
Levski Sofia	6–0	Marek Dupnitsa
Neftochimic Burgas	1–0	Lokomotiv Plovdiv

== Semi-finals ==
Team 1	Score	Team 2	Place
11 March / 15 April 1987
CSKA Sofia	1–0	Neftochimic Burgas	Kazanlak
Levski Sofia	2–0	Lokomotiv GO	Kardzhali

== Third place play-off ==
Team 1	Score	Team 2	Place
1987
Neftochimic Burgas	3–1	Lokomotiv GO	Ihtiman

== Final ==
=== Details ===
13 May 1987

CSKA Sofia	2−1	Levski Sofia
Kirov 33'; Penev 39'		Gochev 62' (pen.)

Vasil Levski National Stadium, Sofia
Attendance: 40,000
Referee: Borislav Aleksandrov (Sofia)

CSKA	Levski
