= Vladimir Stoyanov (footballer) =

Bulgarian footballer (1964–2019)

Personal information
- Full name: Vladimir Rusev Stoyanov
- Date of birth: 27 September 1964
- Place of birth: Burgas, Bulgaria
- Position: Forward

Youth career
- Chernomorets Burgas

Senior career*
Years	Team	Apps	(Gls)
1982–1990	Chernomorets Burgas	194	(91)
1990	Deportivo La Coruña	6	(3)
1990–1991	Chernomorets Burgas	27	(17)
1991–1993	Lokomotiv Sofia	56	(38)
1994	Botev Plovdiv	5	(1)
1994–1995	Spartak Plovdiv		
1995–1996	Chernomorets Burgas		

International career
1989	Bulgaria	1	(0)
- * Club domestic league appearances and goals

Vladimir Stoyanov (Bulgarian: Владимир Стоянов; 27 September 1964 – 18 June 2019) was a Bulgarian footballer who played as a forward. He earned one cap for the Bulgarian national team in 1989.
