= Stadion Chernomorets =

Stadium in Burgas, Bulgaria

Chernomorets Stadium
- Стадион Черноморец
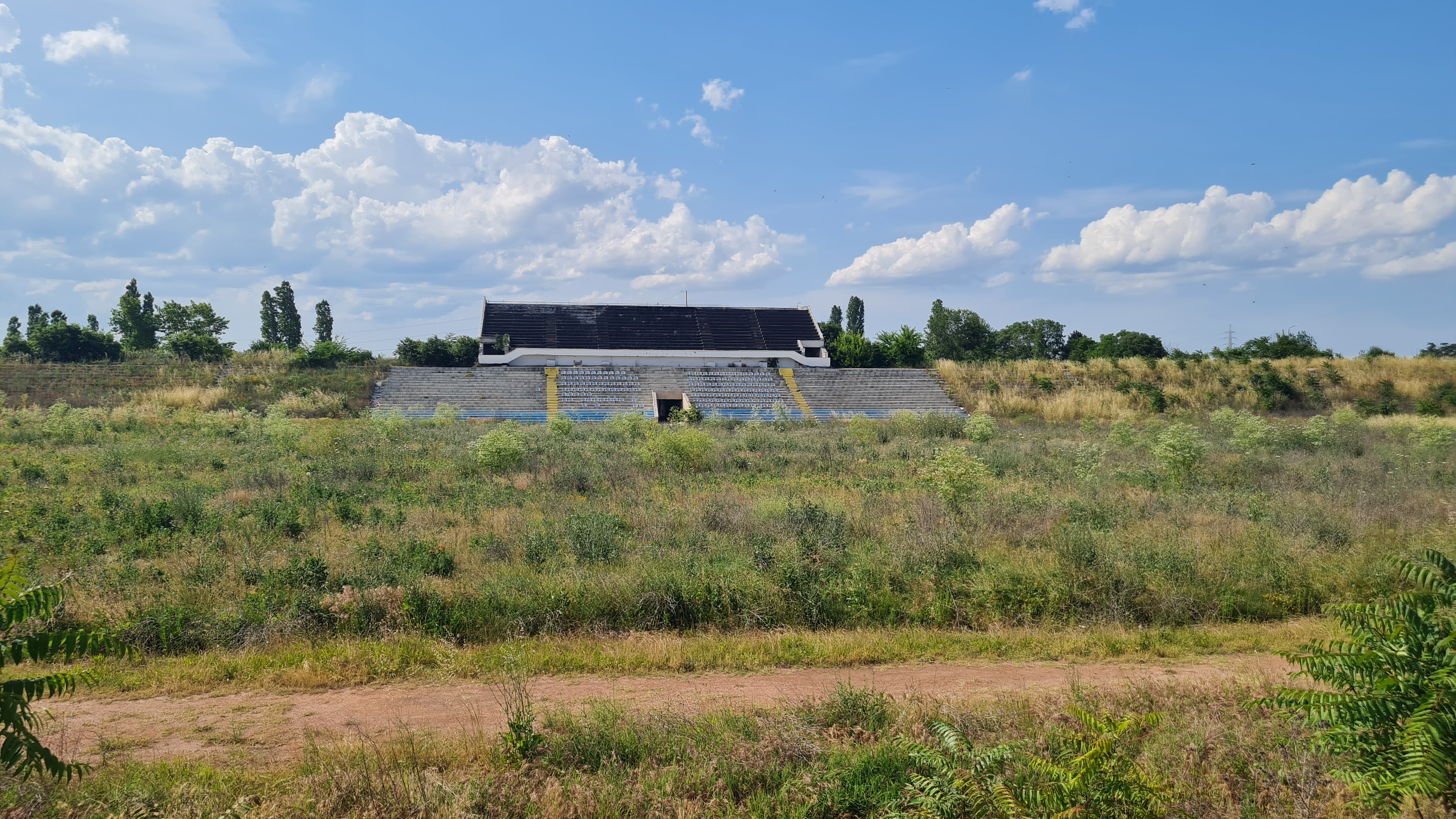
- Interactive map of Chernomorets Stadium
- Full name: Chernomorets Stadium
- Former names: 9th September (1954-1990)
- Location: Burgas, Bulgaria
- Coordinates: 42°29′25″N 27°27′11″E
- Owner: Municipality of Burgas
- Capacity: 1,300 (Licensed); 22,000 (Original)
- Surface: Grass
- Record attendance: 40,000 (FC Chernomorets Burgas - PFC Levski Sofia)
- Field size: 105 X 60

Construction
- Groundbreaking: 1953
- Built: 1954
- Opened: 1954, 2019
- Renovated: 1972, 1997, 2008, 2015, 2019
- Closed: 2022

Tenants
- Chernomorets Burgas (1954-2005); Neftochimic Burgas (1996-1997); Chernomorets 919 (2006); Chernomorets 1919 Burgas (2019-2022)

Chernomorets Stadium (Bulgarian: Стадион „Черноморец“) is a multi-purpose stadium in Burgas, Bulgaria. It was used mostly for football matches and was the home ground of Chernomorets Burgas and FC Chernomorets 1919 Burgas.

== General information ==
The stadium was constructed in 1954 and had an original capacity of 22,000 people. Prior to 1990 the stadium was called "9th September".

In 2006 PSFC Chernomorets Burgas left the stadium for the more modern Lazur Stadium, and two years later the club presented plans for a modern sports complex featuring a stadium supposed to meet all UEFA and FIFA requirements, a shopping centre, office buildings and others. This complex never got completed, or even begun. The sports complex in place of the stadium fell into disrepair.

In 2015, as part of the UEFA European Under-17 Championship, all stadiums that were elected as hosts got finances, and Chernomorets got the most. Part of the things which had to be done with those finances were installing lightning and fixing the stands, but the only things that were done was renovating the locker rooms and reinstalling three training pitches and the main one. The stadium itself was not used for any matches in the tournament, but rather only for training. After the tournament the stadium fell into disrepair once again.

In 2019, as part of the club's 100-year anniversary, FC Chernomorets 1919 Burgas began renovating the stadium. The main sector had new concrete poured over it, with new seats and even a VIP lounge, the administrative building was renovated completely, the pitch was once again reinstalled and the unused stands were cleared of bushes. The renovated stadium had an official capacity of 1300 spectators. This state of the stadium remained until 2022, when the club left due to the increased rent by the stadium's owners. As of then the stadium is nearly back to its pre-2019 state.
