= Lyubomir Sheytanov =

Bulgarian footballer

Personal information
- Full name: Lyubomir Georgiev Sheytanov
- Date of birth: 17 July 1961 (age 65)
- Place of birth: Burgas, Bulgaria
- Height: 1.88 m (6 ft 2 in)
- Position: Goalkeeper

Senior career*
Years	Team	Apps	(Gls)
1980–1981	Lokomotiv Burgas		
1981–1992	Chernomorets Burgas	201	(0)
1992–1993	Dobrudzha Dobrich		
1993–1994	Neftochimic Burgas		

Managerial career
- 1994–1995: Port Burgas (goalkeeping coach)
- 1995–1997: Chernomorets Burgas (goalkeeping coach)
- 1997–1998: Litex Lovech (goalkeeping coach)
- 2000: Levski Sofia (goalkeeping coach)
- 2000–2001: Chernomorets Burgas (goalkeeping coach)
- 2001–2007: Lokomotiv Plovdiv (goalkeeping coach)
- 2007–2011: Bulgaria (goalkeeping coach)
- 2007–2014: Chernomorets Burgas (goalkeeping coach)
- 2015–2016: Bulgaria (goalkeeping coach)
- 2015–2016: Ludogorets Razgrad (goalkeeping coach)
- 2017–2018: Omonia (goalkeeping coach)
- 2019–2020: Bulgaria (goalkeeping coach)
- * Club domestic league appearances and goals

Lyubomir Sheytanov (Bulgarian Cyrillic: Любомир Шейтанов) (born 17 July 1961 in Burgas) is a former Bulgarian footballer who played as a goalkeeper and currently the goalkeeping coach of Bulgaria.
