= Georgi Georgiev (footballer, born 1963) =

Bulgarian footballer

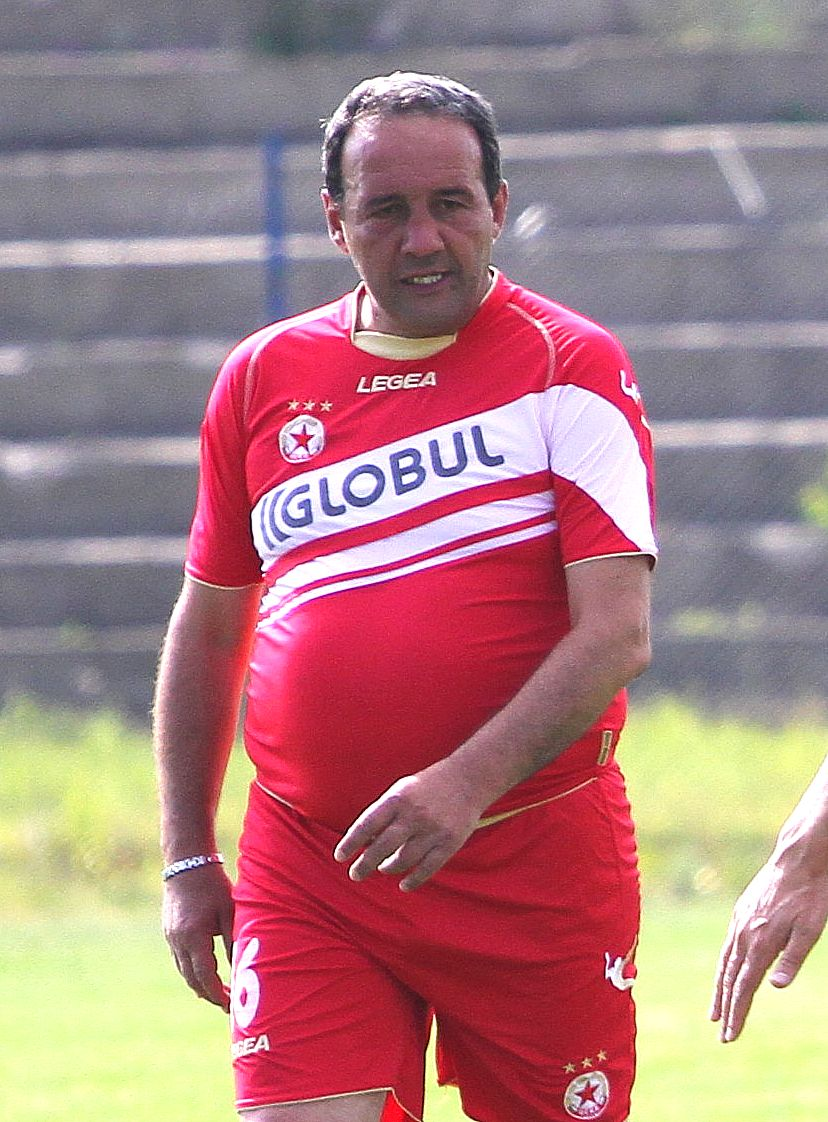
- Georgiev in 2013

Personal information
- Full name: Georgi Kostadinov Georgiev
- Date of birth: 10 January 1963 (age 63)
- Place of birth: Plovdiv, Bulgaria
- Height: 1.78 m (5 ft 10 in)
- Position: Attacking midfielder

Youth career
- 1972–1980: Maritsa Plovdiv

Senior career*
Years	Team	Apps	(Gls)
1980–1984	Maritsa Plovdiv	74	(11)
1984–1988	Botev Plovdiv	98	(26)
1988–1991	CSKA Sofia	72	(15)
1991–1995	Mulhouse	114	(23)
1996	CSKA Sofia	18	(6)
1996–1997	Maritsa Plovdiv	19	(2)
Total		395	(83)

International career
1989–1994	Bulgaria	11	(0)
- * Club domestic league appearances and goals

Georgi Kostadinov Georgiev (Bulgarian: Георги Костадинов Георгиев; born 10 January 1963) is a Bulgarian retired footballer who played as an attacking midfielder. He was part of the Bulgaria national team that reached the semi-finals of the 1994 World Cup.

== Club career ==
Georgiev started his career in Maritsa at the age of 17. He played for his first club from 1980 to 1984, when he was transferred to Botev Plovdiv.

After playing for Botev, Georgiev was transferred to CSKA Sofia. With this club, he became twice champion of Bulgaria in 1988–89 and 1989–90.

In 1991, Georgiev signed with French club FC Mulhouse, where he played for four seasons and produced some of his top rated performances in his career.
