= Iliya Valov =

Bulgarian footballer (1961–2024)

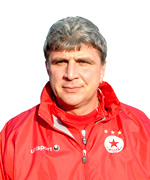

Personal information
- Full name: Iliya Valov Ivanov
- Date of birth: 29 December 1961
- Place of birth: Knezha, Bulgaria
- Date of death: 13 July 2024 (aged 62)
- Place of death: Vratsa, Bulgaria
- Height: 1.88 m (6 ft 2 in)
- Position: Goalkeeper

Youth career
- 1971–1980: Botev Vratsa

Senior career*
Years	Team	Apps	(Gls)
1980–1988	Botev Vratsa	180	(0)
1988–1990	CSKA Sofia	46	(0)
1990	Lokomotiv Sofia	15	(0)
1990–1991	FC Berlin	17	(0)
1991–1992	Austria Wien	8	(0)
1992	Dobrudzha Dobrich	12	(0)
1992–1994	Karşıyaka	54	(0)
1994–1995	Denizlispor	29	(0)
Total		361	(0)

International career
1983–1990	Bulgaria	34	(0)

Managerial career
- 1999–2002: Botev Vratsa
- 2002–2004: Cherno More (goalkeeping coach)
- 2006–2007: CSKA Sofia (goalkeeping coach)
- * Club domestic league appearances and goals

Iliya Valov (Bulgarian: Илия Вълов; 29 December 1961 – 13 July 2024) was a Bulgarian footballer who played as a goalkeeper. He made 34 appearances for Bulgaria.

== Career ==
Valov made 180 appearances for Botev Vratsa from 1981 to 1988. He was the number two goalkeeper to Borislav Mihaylov in the Bulgaria national team's squad at the 1986 FIFA World Cup. He made a total of 34 caps with the national team.

During his career he saved 12 penalty kicks A PFG|in the top division of Bulgarian football.

After retiring as a player, Valov worked as a goalkeeping coach for Cherno More Varna until 2004 before following coach Plamen Markov to CSKA Sofia.

== Personal life and death ==
Valov died from lung disease in Vratsa on 13 July 2024, at the age of 62. He was the father of Valentin Iliev.
