= FC Chernomorets Burgas =

Chernomorets
- Full name: FC Chernomorets Burgas
- Nickname: Akulite (The Sharks)
- Founded: 1 August 1919 (106 years ago)
- Dissolved: 2006 (20 years ago)
- Ground: Chernomorets Stadium, Burgas
- Capacity: 22,000
- Chairman: Ivaylo Drazhev
- League: V AFG
- 2006–07: 18th
Home colours	Away colours

FC Chernomorets Burgas (Bulgarian: ФК Черноморец Бургас) or simply Chernomorets (Bulgarian: Черноморец) were a Bulgarian football club from the city of Burgas. Chernomorets played its home matches at the local Chernomorets Stadium. The team was a runner-up in the Bulgarian Cup and Bulgarian Supercup competitions.

Chernomorets established itself as one of the most consistent teams in Bulgaria, spending most of its history in the top tier A Group. Financial problems started in the early 2000s however, and the club eventually folded after the 2005–06 season. An unofficial successor, PSFC Chernomorets Burgas was soon founded. The new club played in the top tier between 2007 and 2014, but also encountered financial problems, folding in 2019. A third club from Burgas was created in the wake of PSFC Chernomorets’ problems, named FC Chernomorets 1919 Burgas, which began playing in the amateur levels.

== Club colours ==
Light blue	White

=== Kit history ===
Period	Shirt sponsor
1982–1983	none
1988–1989	none
1992–1993	Red Lion Group
1999–2000	RWE
2000–2001	Burgasko
2001–2002	none
2002–2003	Blagoustroystveni Stroeji

Period	Kit manufacturer
1982–1983	Adidas
1988–1989	Puma
1993–1994	Adidas
1999–2001	Puma
2001–2002	Legea

== History ==
=== 1905–1958 ===
In 1905, a group of Bulgarian students from the Robert College of Istanbul created a new sports club in Burgas with the name SC Strela. Several years later, SC Strela was officially licensed as an association and in May 1912, the local municipality chose the first staff and the first president of the club. In the period between 1918 and 1919, SC Strela had a roster of 200 members, slowly growing into an association with a big importance to the city. Тherefore some changes had to be made and on 1 August 1919, the first president of the club was chosen to be Stefan Ilic. By his suggestion, the club's name was chosen to be changed to SC Chernomorets and the same year, a football department was created to the sports society, named FC Chernomorets.

Between 1919 and 1944, the football club participated in the Bulgarian State Championship, regularly promoting and relegating from the different divisions of the league. In the following years several changes were made. In 1944, the club was bought by the Municipality of Burgas, its name was changed to FC Lyuboslav and a new manager was hired – the prominent Hungarian coach Kramer Lipot. However the results were not good and soon he was sacked from his job. Years later, the bad results were the reason to bring FC Lyuboslav to a dissolve.

=== 1958–2006 ===
When the Bulgarian A Group became the new top-tier league format of Bulgaria in 1948, Chernomorets was selected to be one of the ten teams to compete in the new league. Chernomorets finished in last place, however, and was relegated to the B Group.

In 1958, the communist authorities in Burgas decided to reestablish the sports club, which is considered a successor of the achievements of the former FC Chernomorets. The sports club was named SC Botev in honour of the Bulgarian national hero – Hristo Botev. Several years later, the authorities however decided to rename the club to its former name, FC Chernomorets.

It took Chernomorets 16 years to return to the top flight following the relegation in 1949. Chernomorets spent eight seasons in the A Group, from 1965 until 1973. The Sharks were relegated in 1973, and the next four seasons were spent in the B Group. In 1977, another promotion to the A Group followed.

FC Chernomorets's best seasons in the Bulgarian top division were in the 1981–82 and 1983–84 seasons, finishing in the 5th place. Since its establishment, the club had played a total of 31 seasons in the Bulgarian top division. In 1989, Chernomorets surprisingly reached the final of the Bulgarian Cup and played against PFC CSKA Sofia, but the result of the match was a 0:3 loss for Chernomorets. In spite of the loss, the team led by Dian Petkov, Zlatko Yankov, Lyubomir Sheytanov and Vlado Stoyanov, managed to earn a position to participate in the UEFA Cup Winners' Cup. The club's first participation in European club tournaments was not long-lived, however. The team faced Dinamo Tirana from Albania. The first game in Burgas, in the presence of 17,000 spectators at the Chernomorets Stadium, ended with a 3–1 win. But the second game in Tirana finished with a shameful 0–4 loss and Chernomorets were out of the cup winners cup tournament. A few years later, in 1994 Chernomorets were relegated to Southern "B" Group and its return to A PFG in 1999 was with his new owner Ivaylo Drazhev, who had bought the club in 1997.

In 2004, the club with president Ivaylo Drazhev went bankrupt and in the following two seasons Chernomorets was relegated from the top division of the Bulgarian football. The future of the club was unknown and in late 2006 FC Chernomorets withdrew from the South-East V AFG because of financial difficulties and was dissolved shortly thereafter.

A successor club, named PSFC Chernomorets Burgas, was established while the old club was suffering from financial problems. The new club quickly progressed through the lower leagues and promoted to the A Group in 2007. The new club was as not considered a direct and legal successor to the original club, however. The Bulgarian Football Union keeps the records separate. After years of financial problems, PSFC was relegated from the top level in 2014, after which a new club was created, FC Chernomorets 1919 Burgas, which is considered the legal successor to the original club, and their records are shared.

=== Historical names ===
Years	Names
1919–28	FC Chernomorets
1929–31	FC Chernomorets-29
1931–44	FC Chernomorets
1944–58	FC Lyuboslav
1958–68	FC Botev
1968-06	FC Chernomorets

=== Performance by seasons ===
Season		Pos.	Pl.	W	D	L	GS	GA	P	Cup	Notes
1938	BSFC	8	18	4	4	10	30	40	12	N/A	
1939	BSFC	10	18	0	4	14	17	61	4	N/A	Relegated
1948–49	RFD	10	18	2	3	13	15	38	7	1/4	Relegated
1957	Southern B RFG	8	30	10	10	10	42	50	30	N/A	
1958	Southern B RFG	10	15	5	4	6	17	18	14	N/A	
1958–59	Southern B RFG	10	30	13	5	11	45	42	31	1/4	Relegated
1961–62	B RFG	10	30	9	8	13	41	49	26	N/A	
1962–63	Southern B RFG	11	38	15	6	17	61	55	36	N/A	
1963–64	Southern B RFG	6	34	13	13	8	53	42	39	N/A	
1964–65	Southern B RFG	1	34	19	6	9	57	29	44	N/A	Promoted
1965–66	A RFG	14	30	8	9	13	34	48	25	1/8	
1966–67	A RFG	9	30	10	10	10	38	35	30	2nd in Group 1	
1967–68	A RFG	13	30	9	7	14	35	53	25	1/2	
1968–69	A RFG	7	30	10	8	12	51	56	28	3rd in Group 1	
1969–70	A RFG	8	30	10	9	11	33	41	29	1/8	
1970–71	A RFG	15	30	6	7	17	33	66	19	3rd in Group 3	
1971–72	A RFG	14	34	11	8	15	47	49	28	1/16	
1972–73	A RFG	12	34	12	7	15	35	44	31	1/4	drawn
1973–74	Southern B RFG	2	36	23	6	7	81	34	52	1/4	
1974–75	Southern B RFG	2	38	18	8	12	52	40	44	N/A	
1975–76	Southern B RFG	7	38	16	8	14	61	47	40	1/32	
1976–77	Southern B RFG	1	38	20	10	8	60	30	50	1/32	Promoted
1977–78	A RFG	10	30	11	5	14	45	43	27	1/16	
1978–79	A RFG	5	30	13	8	9	45	43	34	1/8	
1979–80	A RFG	9	30	12	3	15	39	42	27	1/4	
1980–81	A RFG	11	30	9	10	11	42	49	28	1st leg	
1981–82	A RFG	6	30	14	4	12	48	44	32	N/A	
1982–83	A RFG	13	30	12	4	14	41	47	28	N/A	
1983–84	A RFG	5	30	12	7	11	43	47	31	N/A	
1984–85	A RFG	16	30	8	5	17	35	57	21	N/A	Relegated
1985–86	B RFG	1	38	21	7	10	81	42	48	N/A	Promoted
1986–87	A RFG	12	30	10	4	16	48	76	24	N/A	
1987–88	A RFG	15	30	9	3	18	27	50	21	1/4	Relegated
1988–89	B RFG	2	38	20	10	8	63	32	50	Final	Promoted
1989–90	A RFG	11	30	11	7	12	36	41	29	N/A	
1990–91	A FG	7	30	11	8	11	41	50	30	2nd in Group 1	
1991–92	A RFG	12	30	8	9	13	28	43	25	1/16	
1992–93	A RFG	8	30	11	8	11	33	31	30	1/8	
1993–94	A FG	13	28	8	6	14	30	36	30	1/16	Relegated
1994–95	Southern B RFG	9	30	13	7	10	43	35	46	N/A	Relegated
1995–96	South East V Group	-	-	-	-	-	-	-	-	3rd leg	Promoted
1996–97	B RFG	7	34	16	4	14	51	39	52	1/8	
1997–98	B RFG	4	30	18	5	7	50	17	59	1/16	
1998–99	B RFG	1	30	21	3	6	62	20	66	2nd leg	Promoted
1999-00	A FG	10	30	10	7	13	31	40	37	1/2	
2000–01	Premier football league	11	26	6	4	16	22	48	22	1/16	
2001–02	Premier football league	10	40	13	9	18	41	69	35	1/16	
2002–03	Premier football league	11	26	7	3	16	32	56	24	1/4	
2003–04	A FG	16	30	4	6	20	30	68	18	1/8	Relegated
2004–05	B PFG	15	30	5	4	21	29	64	19	1st leg	Relegated
2005–06	South East V Group	14	30	6	5	19	26	56	23	N/A	
2006–07	South East V Group	18	34	0	0	34	8	161	0	N/A	Withdrawn

=== European ===
Intertoto Cup and UEFA Cup

Season	Competition	Round	Country	Club	Home	Away	Aggregate
1982	Intertoto Cup	Group 9	(Czechoslovakia)	Baník Ostrava	5–2	1–3	N/A
1982	Intertoto Cup	Group 9	(Sweden)	IFK Göteborg	2–4	4–4	N/A
1982	Intertoto Cup	Group 9	(Denmark)	Næstved	4–0	1–2	N/A
1985	Intertoto Cup	Group 11	(Norway)	Start	2–0	0–1	N/A
1985	Intertoto Cup	Group 11	(Switzerland)	Aarau	4–1	3–3	N/A
1985	Intertoto Cup	Group 11	(Hungary)	MTK	1–2	1–5	N/A
1989–90	UEFA Cup Winners' Cup	QR	(Albania)	Dinamo Tirana	3–1	0–4	3–5

== Honours ==
Bulgarian A PFG:

- Fifth place (2): 1979, 1984

Bulgarian Cup

- Runner-up (1): 1989

Bulgarian Supercup

- Runner-up (1): 1989

== Notable players ==
- For all players with a Wikipedia article see Category:FC Chernomorets Burgas players.

Had international caps for their respective countries, held any club record, or had more than 100 league appearances. Players whose name is listed in bold represented their countries.

Bulgaria

- (Bulgaria) **Aleksandar Aleksandrov**
- (Bulgaria) **Emil Angelov**
- (Bulgaria) **Simeon Chilibonov**
- (Bulgaria) **Georgi Chilikov**
- (Bulgaria) **Georgi Dimitrov**
- (Bulgaria) Kostadin Dzhambazov
- (Bulgaria) **Rusi Gochev**
- (Bulgaria) Vesislav Ilchev
- (Bulgaria) **Yanko Kirilov**
- (Bulgaria) **Radostin Kishishev**
- (Bulgaria) Miroslav Kosev
- (Bulgaria) Petar Kyumurdzhiev
- (Bulgaria) **Valentin Naydenov**
- (Bulgaria) **Diyan Petkov**
- (Bulgaria) **Ivan Pritargov**
- (Bulgaria) Nikolay Rusev
- (Bulgaria) Lyubomir Sheytanov
- (Bulgaria) **Valentin Stanchev**
- (Bulgaria) **Kostadin Stoyanov**
- (Bulgaria) **Vladimir Stoyanov**
- (Bulgaria) **Angel Stoykov**
- (Bulgaria) **Yordan Todorov**
- (Bulgaria) Stefan Traykov
- (Bulgaria) **Zlatko Yankov**
- (Bulgaria) **Georgi Yordanov**
- (Bulgaria) **Petar Zhabov**

Asia

- (Uzbekistan) **Georgi Georgiev**

Africa

- (South Africa) **Simba Marumo**

== Notable coaches ==
- (Hungary) Kramer Lipot
- (Bulgaria) Evgeni Yanchovski
- (Bulgaria) Totko Dremsizov – lead the sharks seven consecutive seasons (record)
- (Bulgaria) Lyubomir Borisov
- (Bulgaria) Vasil Zelev – the most successful coach for the club
- (Bulgaria) Ivan Tsvetanov
- (Bulgaria) Miroslav Kralev
