= 1988–89 FC Lokomotiv Gorna Oryahovitsa season =

Lokomotiv GO
1988–89 season
- Manager: Todor Velev
- A PFG: 12th Place
- Bulgarian Cup: 1/8 finals
- Top goalscorer: Dimitar Pechikamakov (10)

The 1988–89 season was FC Lokomotiv Gorna Oryahovitsa's third season in A PFG.

== First-team squad ==
Note: Flags indicate national team as defined under FIFA eligibility rules; some limited exceptions apply. Players may hold more than one non-FIFA nationality.

No.	Pos.	Nation	Player
—	GK	(Bulgaria) BUL	Toshko Arsov 18/0
—	DF	(Bulgaria) BUL	Levent Gavazov 28/0
—	DF	(Bulgaria) BUL	Manol Manolov 26/1
—	DF	(Bulgaria) BUL	Angel Chervenkov 30/0
—	MF	(Bulgaria) BUL	Ljubomir Rusev 29/1
—	MF	(Bulgaria) BUL	Dimitar Pechikamakov 29/10
—	MF	(Bulgaria) BUL	Boris Iliev 3/0
—	FW	(Bulgaria) BUL	Valeri Ganev 25/3
—	MF	(Bulgaria) BUL	Tsvetan Galev 10/1
—	FW	(Bulgaria) BUL	Asan Abishev 24/1
—	DF	(Bulgaria) BUL	Sasho Angelov 18/0
—	MF	(Bulgaria) BUL	Hristo Mihaylov 14/1

No.	Pos.	Nation	Player
—	GK	(Bulgaria) BUL	Rumen Dankov 12/0
—	DF	(Bulgaria) BUL	Angel Minchev 15/0
—	FW	(Bulgaria) BUL	Nako Doichev 6/1
—	MF	(Bulgaria) BUL	Tsenko Gavazov 26/0
—	FW	(Bulgaria) BUL	Hristo Kanchev 4/0
—	MF	(Bulgaria) BUL	Ljubomir Zhelev 13/4
—	DF	(Bulgaria) BUL	Aleksandar Chavdarov 10/0
—	DF	(Bulgaria) BUL	Trifon Grudev 2/0
—	MF	(Bulgaria) BUL	Stiliyan Madjarov 11/1
—	DF	(Bulgaria) BUL	Georgi Djondjorov 10/0
—	MF	(Bulgaria) BUL	Iliya Velichkov 2/0
—	MF	(Bulgaria) BUL	Yordan Petkov 2/0

== Fixtures ==
=== League ===
The team is finished 12th after 30 games in his third "A"group's season.

13.08.1988 1	Lokomotiv GO	0–1	Dunav Ruse	Gorna Oryahovitsa

20.08.1988 2	Minyor Pernik	1–2	Lokomotiv GO	Pernik
			Dimitar Pechikamakov-2

28.08.1988 3	Lokomotiv GO	0–4	Etar	Gorna Oryahovitsa

03.09.1988 4	Lokomotiv Plovdiv	2–1	Lokomotiv GO	Plovdiv

11.09.1988 5	Lokomotiv GO	2–1	Levski	Gorna Oryahovitsa
	Valeri Ganev 5'; Nako Doichev 37'		Georgi Yordanov 86'

17.09.1988 6	Cherno More	1–0	Lokomotiv GO	Varna

24.09.1988 7	Lokomotiv GO	1–2	Beroe	Gorna Oryahovitsa

01.10.1988 8	Sliven	2–0	Lokomotiv GO	Sliven

12.10.1988 9	Lokomotiv GO	1–0	Pirin Blagoevgrad	Gorna Oryahovitsa

22.10.1988 10	Botev Plovdiv	2–0	Lokomotiv GO	Plovdiv

05.11.1988 11	Lokomotiv GO	0–2	Lokomotiv Sofia	Gorna Oryahovitsa

13.11.1988 12	Lokomotiv GO	0–3	CSKA Sofia	Gorna Oryahovitsa

19.11.1988 13	Slavia Sofia	0–0	Lokomotiv GO	Sofia

26.11.1988 14	Lokomotiv GO	3–2	Spartak Varna	Gorna Oryahovitsa

03.12.1988 15	Botev Vratsa	0–0	Lokomotiv GO	Vratsa

25.02.1989 16	Dunav Ruse	1–0	Lokomotiv GO	Ruse

04.03.1989 17	Lokomotiv GO	1–0	Minyor Pernik	Gorna Oryahovitsa
	Hristo Mihaylov

11.03.1989 18	Etar	4–1	Lokomotiv GO	Veliko Tarnovo

18.03.1989 19	Lokomotiv GO	2–0	Lokomotiv Plovdiv	Gorna Oryahovitsa

25.03.1989 20	Levski	1–0	Lokomotiv GO	Sofia

01.04.1989 21	Lokomotiv GO	1–0	Cherno More	Gorna Oryahovitsa

08.04.1989 22	Beroe	3–2	Lokomotiv GO	Stara Zagora

15.04.1989 23	Lokomotiv GO	1–0	Sliven	Gorna Oryahovitsa

18.04.1989 24	Pirin Blagoevgrad	3–0	Lokomotiv GO	Blagoevgrad

25.04.1989 25	Lokomotiv GO	1–0	Botev Plovdiv	Gorna Oryahovitsa

06.05.1989 26	Lokomotiv Sofia	0–0	Lokomotiv GO	Sofia

09.05.1989 27	CSKA Sofia	7–1	Lokomotiv GO	Sofia

20.05.1989 28	Lokomotiv GO	2–1	Slavia Sofia	Gorna Oryahovitsa

28.05.1989 29	Spartak Varna	1–1	Lokomotiv GO	Varna

03.06.1989 30	Lokomotiv GO	3–1	Botev Vratsa	Gorna Oryahovitsa

== League standings ==
Pos	Team	Pld	W	D	L	GF	GA	GD	Pts
10	Sliven	30	11	5	14	38	39	−1	27
11	Slavia Sofia	30	8	10	12	32	36	−4	26
12	Lokomotiv G. Oryahovitsa	30	11	4	15	26	45	−19	26
13	Vratsa	30	9	8	13	32	53	−21	26
14	Lokomotiv Plovdiv	30	10	6	14	31	55	−24	26

Source: RSSSF - Bulgaria Championship History 1924-2009
Rules for classification: 1st points; 2nd goal difference; 3rd goals scored; 4th head-to-head points; 5th head-to-head goal difference; 6th head-to-head goals scored; 7th head-to-head away goals scored;

=== Cup ===
Lokomotiv GO dropped after the loss of second divisional Hebаr

==== 1/8 finals ====
Hebar Pazardzhik	2–0	Lokomotiv GO	Pazardzhik
