= 1991–92 FC Lokomotiv Gorna Oryahovitsa season =

Lokomotiv GO
1991–92 season
- Manager: Nikola Velkov
- A PFG: 8th Place
- Bulgarian Cup: 1/16 finals
- Top goalscorer: Sasho Angelov (5)

The 1991–92 season is FC Lokomotiv Gorna Oryahovitsa's 6th season in A PFG.

== First-team squad ==
Note: Flags indicate national team as defined under FIFA eligibility rules; some limited exceptions apply. Players may hold more than one non-FIFA nationality.

No.	Pos.	Nation	Player
—	DF	(Bulgaria) BUL	Filip Filipov 27/2
—	DF	(Bulgaria) BUL	Levent Gavazov 30/0
—	DF	(Bulgaria) BUL	Dimcho Markov 22/1
—	DF	(Bulgaria) BUL	Adalbert Zafirov 24/1
—	MF	(Bulgaria) BUL	Valentin Stankov 7/0
—	MF	(Bulgaria) BUL	Dimitar Pechikamakov 17/1
—	MF	(Bulgaria) BUL	Ali Mustafov 12/2
—	FW	(Bulgaria) BUL	Valeri Ganev 17/0
—	DF	(Bulgaria) BUL	Sasho Angelov 29/5
—	DF	(Bulgaria) BUL	Ivan Milchev 12/0
—	MF	(Bulgaria) BUL	Yakov Paparkov 6/0
—	MF	(Bulgaria) BUL	Nazif Kadir 29/2

No.	Pos.	Nation	Player
—	GK	(Bulgaria) BUL	Tihomir Todorov 24/0
—	DF	(Bulgaria) BUL	Nikolay Donev 19/1
—	FW	(Bulgaria) BUL	Blagovest Petkov 23/3
—	MF	(Bulgaria) BUL	Kostadin Kyuchukov 9/0
—	FW	(Bulgaria) BUL	Dimitar Gyudzhemenov 15/2
—	DF	(Bulgaria) BUL	Angel Velev 20/1
—	MF	(Bulgaria) BUL	Marin Baychev 11/0
—	GK	(Bulgaria) BUL	Pavlin Ivanov 6/0
—	DF	(Bulgaria) BUL	Dimitar Balabanov 9/0
—	MF	(Bulgaria) BUL	Miroslav Baychev 8/1
—	DF	(Bulgaria) BUL	Eduard Todorov 7/0
—	FW	(Bulgaria) BUL	Traycho Traychev 1/0

== Fixtures ==
=== League ===
The team is finished 11th after 30 games in his fifth "A"group's season.

17.08.1991 1	Lokomotiv GO	1–1	Hebar	Gorna Oryahovitsa

24.08.1991 2	Beroe	1–0	Lokomotiv GO	Stara Zagora

31.08.1991 3	Lokomotiv GO	1–1	Pirin Bl	Gorna Oryahovitsa

07.09.1991 4	Etar	1–1	Lokomotiv GO	Veliko Tarnovo

14.09.1991 5	Lokomotiv GO	0–1	CSKA	Gorna Oryahovitsa

21.09.1991 6	Botev Plovdiv	3–0	Lokomotiv GO	Plovdiv

28.09.1991 7	Lokomotiv GO	1–0	Dobrudzha	Gorna Oryahovitsa

05.10.1991 8	Sliven	1–2	Lokomotiv GO	Sliven

12.10.1991 9	Lokomotiv GO	1–1	Chernomorets Burgas	Gorna Oryahovitsa

19.10.1991 10	Minyor	0–1	Lokomotiv GO	Pernik

27.10.1991 11	Lokomotiv GO	0–2	Levski Sofia	Gorna Oryahovitsa

02.11.1991 12	Lokomotiv GO	4–2	Lokomotiv Sofia	Gorna Oryahovitsa

10.11.1991 13	Slavia Sofia	2–0	Lokomotiv GO	Sofia

23.11.1991 14	Lokomotiv GO	2–0	Lokomotiv Plovdiv	Gorna Oryahovitsa

30.11.1991 15	Yantra	1–0	Lokomotiv GO	Gabrovo

22.02.1992 16	Hebar	0–0	Lokomotiv GO	Pazardzhik

29.02.1992 17	Lokomotiv GO	1–0	Beroe	Gorna Oryahovitsa

07.03.1992 18	Pirin Bl	0–0	Lokomotiv GO	Blagoevgrad

14.03.1992 19	Lokomotiv GO	0:2	Etar	Gorna Oryahovitsa

21.03.1992 20	CSKA	5:0	Lokomotiv GO	Sofia

28.03.1992 21	Lokomotiv GO	2:2	Botev Plovdiv	Gorna Oryahovitsa

04.04.1992 22	Dobrudzha	1:0	Lokomotiv GO	Dobrich

11.04.1992 23	Lokomotiv GO	2:1	Sliven	Gorna Oryahovitsa

18.04.1992 24	Chernomorets Burgas	1:0	Lokomotiv GO	Burgas

25.04.1992 25	Lokomotiv GO	1:0	Minyor	Gorna Oryahovitsa

02.05.1992 26	Levski Sofia	5:0	Lokomotiv GO	Sofia

09.05.1992 27	Lokomotiv Sofia	3:1	Lokomotiv GO	Sofia

17.05.1992 28	Lokomotiv GO	1:1	Slavia Sofia	Gorna Oryahovitsa

23.05.1992 29	Lokomotiv Plovdiv	2:0	Lokomotiv GO	Plovdiv

30.05.1992 30	Lokomotiv GO	2:0	Yantra	Gorna Oryahovitsa

=== League standings ===
Pos	Team	Pld	W	D	L	GF	GA	GD	Pts
9	Yantra Gabrovo	30	8	11	11	24	33	−9	27
10	Slavia Sofia	30	8	10	12	33	31	+2	26
11	Lokomotiv G. Oryahovitsa	30	9	8	13	23	39	−16	26
12	Chernomorets Burgas	30	8	9	13	28	43	−15	25
13	Pirin Blagoevgrad	30	7	9	14	22	34	−12	23

Source: rsssf.com

=== Bulgarian Cup ===
==== 1/16 finals ====
Beroe	5–1	Lokomotiv GO	Stara Zagora

Lokomotiv GO	2–1	Beroe	Gorna Oryahovitsa

Lokomotiv GO loss with aggregate: 3–6.
