= 1985–86 Bulgarian Cup =

Tournament details
- Country: Bulgaria

Final positions
- Champions: Levski Sofia (16th cup)
- Runners-up: CSKA Sofia

Tournament statistics
- Top goal scorer(s): Mihail Valchev (Levski) (5 goals)

The 1985–86 Bulgarian Cup was the 46th season of the Bulgarian Cup. Levski Sofia won the competition, beating CSKA Sofia 2–1 in the final at the Vasil Levski National Stadium in Sofia.

== First round ==
Team 1	Score	Team 2
1985
Dimitrovgrad	1–0	Dorostol Silistra
Lokomotiv Ruse	1–0	Svetkavitsa
Chernomorets Burgas	4–1	Rilski Sportist
Chirpan	1–0	Rozova Dolina
Neftochimic Burgas	1–0	Lokomotiv GO
Balkan Botevgrad	1–0	Haskovo
Ludogorets Razgrad	4–1	Minyor Pernik
Montana	2–1	Dobrudzha Dobrich
Arda Kardzhali	0–0 (a.e.t.) (4–3 p)	Spartak Plovdiv
Vihren Sandanski	2–0	Litex Lovech

== Second round ==
Team 1	Score	Team 2
1985
Dimitrovgrad	0–2	Neftochimic Burgas
Lokomotiv Ruse	4–1	Akademik Svishtov
Chirpan	2–1 (a.e.t.)	Botev Vratsa
Etar Veliko Tarnovo	3–2	Slavia Sofia
Spartak Varna	2–1	Chernomorets Burgas
Ludogorets Razgrad	5–3	Vihren Sandanski
Montana	3–2	Cherno More Varna
Arda Kardzhali	1–2 (a.e.t.)	Dunav Ruse
Spartak Pleven	2–2 (a.e.t.) (6–4 p)	Beroe Stara Zagora
Sliven	4–2 (a.e.t.)	Lokomotiv Plovdiv

== Third round ==
=== Group 1 ===
Team 1	Score	Team 2	Place
2 February 1986
Levski Sofia	3–1	Botev Plovdiv	Stara Zagora
Lokomotiv Sofia	2–0	Montana	Kazanlak

=== Group 2 ===
Team 1	Score	Team 2	Place
2 February 1986
Lokomotiv Ruse	2–0	Ludogorets Razgrad	Riltsi
CSKA Sofia	4–2	Chirpan	Sandanski

=== Group 3 ===
Team 1	Score	Team 2	Place
2 February 1986
Etar Veliko Tarnovo	9–1	Neftochimic Burgas	Sliven
Dunav Ruse	2–1	Balkan Botevgrad	Nova Zagora

=== Group 4 ===
Team 1	Score	Team 2	Place
2 February 1986
Spartak Pleven	1–0 (a.e.t.)	Spartak Varna	Burgas
Sliven	5–0	Pirin Blagoevgrad	Pomorie

== Quarter-finals ==
=== Group 1 ===
Team 1	Score	Team 2	Place
5 February 1986
Levski Sofia	3–2	Lokomotiv Sofia	Sofia

=== Group 2 ===
Team 1	Score	Team 2	Place
5 February 1986
CSKA Sofia	3–1	Lokomotiv Ruse	Sandanski

=== Group 3 ===
Team 1	Score	Team 2	Place
5 February 1986
Etar Veliko Tarnovo	2–1	Dunav Ruse	Sliven

=== Group 4 ===
Team 1	Score	Team 2	Place
5 February 1986
Sliven	3–2	Spartak Pleven	Burgas

== Semi-finals ==
Team 1	Score	Team 2
8 February 1986
CSKA Sofia	4–3	Sliven
Etar Veliko Tarnovo	3–7	Levski Sofia

== Third place play-off ==
Team 1	Score	Team 2
26 April 1986
Etar Veliko Tarnovo	2–0	Sliven

== Final ==
=== Details ===
27 April 1986

Levski Sofia	2−1	CSKA Sofia
Valchev 3', 22'		Slavkov 56' (pen.)

Vasil Levski National Stadium, Sofia
Attendance: 28,000
Referee: Bogdan Dochev (Sofia)

Levski	CSKA
