= 1990–91 FC Lokomotiv Gorna Oryahovitsa season =

Lokomotiv GO
1990–91 season
- Manager: Petar Kirilov
- A PFG: 8th
- Top goalscorer: Ivaylo Yordanov (21)

The 1990–91 season was FC Lokomotiv Gorna Oryahovitsa's fifth season in A PFG.

== First-team squad ==
Note: Flags indicate national team as defined under FIFA eligibility rules; some limited exceptions apply. Players may hold more than one non-FIFA nationality.

No.	Pos.	Nation	Player
—	GK	(Bulgaria) BUL	Toshko Arsov 21/0
—	DF	(Bulgaria) BUL	Levent Gavazov 30/0
—	DF	(Bulgaria) BUL	Manol Manolov 29/1
—	DF	(Bulgaria) BUL	Adalbert Zafirov 29/1
—	MF	(Bulgaria) BUL	Yordan Marinov 26/3
—	MF	(Bulgaria) BUL	Dimitar Pechikamakov 18/1
—	MF	(Bulgaria) BUL	Shefket Mustafov 29/4
—	FW	(Bulgaria) BUL	Valeri Ganev 28/3
—	DF	(Bulgaria) BUL	Sasho Angelov 30/0

No.	Pos.	Nation	Player
—	GK	(Bulgaria) BUL	Tihomir Todorov 1/0
—	DF	(Bulgaria) BUL	Angel Minchev 16/0
—	FW	(Bulgaria) BUL	Ivaylo Yordanov 29/21
—	MF	(Bulgaria) BUL	Tsenko Gavazov 5/0
—	FW	(Bulgaria) BUL	Dimitar Gyudjemenov 30/5
—	DF	(Bulgaria) BUL	Angel Velev 29/1
—	MF	(Bulgaria) BUL	Marin Baychev 12/2
—	GK	(Bulgaria) BUL	Pavlin Ivanov 9/0
—	DF	(Bulgaria) BUL	Dimitar Balabanov 3/0

== Fixtures ==
=== League ===
The team is finished 8th after 30 games in his fifth "A"group's season.

11.08.1990 1	Lokomotiv GO	1–0	Haskovo	Gorna Oryahovitsa

18.08.1990 2	Dunav Ruse	2–1	Lokomotiv GO	Ruse

22.08.1990 3	Lokomotiv GO	2–0	Lokomotiv Plovdiv	Gorna Oryahovitsa
	Ivaylo Yordanov

26.08.1990 4	Etar	2–1	Lokomotiv GO	Veliko Tarnovo
			Ivaylo Yordanov

01.09.1990 5	Lokomotiv GO	3–1	Chernomorets Burgas	Gorna Oryahovitsa
	Ivaylo Yordanov-2

15.09.1990 6	Lokomotiv Sofia	1–1	Lokomotiv GO	Sofia

22.09.1990 7	Lokomotiv GO	2–0	Levski	Gorna Oryahovitsa

29.09.1990 8	Minyor	1–0	Lokomotiv GO	Pernik

06.10.1990 9	Lokomotiv GO	3–1	Yantra	Gorna Oryahovitsa
	Ivaylo Yordanov-3

21.10.1990 10	Botev Plovdiv	0–1	Lokomotiv GO	Plovdiv
			Valeri Ganev

27.10.1990 11	Lokomotiv GO	2–3	Beroe	Gorna Oryahovitsa
	Ivaylo Yordanov

03.11.1990 12	Lokomotiv GO	2–1	Pirin Blagoevgrad	Gorna Oryahovitsa
	Ivaylo Yordanov

18.11.1990 13	Sliven	0–0	Lokomotiv GO	Sliven

24.11.1990 14	Lokomotiv GO	2–0	CSKA Sofia	Gorna Oryahovitsa
	Ivaylo Yordanov 58' 70'

02.12.1990 15	Slavia Sofia	3–1	Lokomotiv GO	Sofia
			Ivaylo Yordanov

23.02.1991 16	Haskovo	1–0	Lokomotiv GO	Haskovo

02.03.1991 17	Lokomotiv GO	3–1	Dunav Ruse	Gorna Oryahovitsa
	Ivaylo Yordanov-3

09.03.1991 18	Lokomotiv Plovdiv	3–2	Lokomotiv GO	Plovdiv
			Marin Baychev; Ivaylo Yordanov

16.03.1991 19	Lokomotiv GO	0–4	Etar	Gorna Oryahovitsa

19.03.1991 20	Chernomorets Burgas	2–1	Lokomotiv GO	Burgas
			Ivaylo Yordanov

31.03.1991 21	Lokomotiv GO	1–1	Lokomotiv Sofia	Gorna Oryahovitsa

06.04.1991 22	Levski	2–1	Lokomotiv GO	Sofia

13.04.1991 23	Lokomotiv GO	3–0	Minyor	Gorna Oryahovitsa

20.04.1991 24	Yantra	2–1	Lokomotiv GO	Gabrovo

04.05.1991 25	Lokomotiv GO	2–0	Botev Plovdiv	Gorna Oryahovitsa

11.05.1991 26	Beroe	3–2	Lokomotiv GO	Stara Zagora
			Ivaylo Yordanov

15.05.1991 27	Pirin Blagoevgrad	1–2	Lokomotiv GO	Blagoevgrad
			Ivaylo Yordanov-2

25.05.1991 28	Lokomotiv GO	1–0	Sliven	Gorna Oryahovitsa

01.06.1991 29	CSKA Sofia	2–1	Lokomotiv GO	Sofia
			Ivaylo Yordanov

08.06.1991 30	Lokomotiv GO	0–2	Slavia Sofia	Gorna Oryahovitsa

=== League standings ===
Pos	Team	Pld	W	D	L	GF	GA	GD	Pts	Qualification or relegation
6	Levski Sofia	30	12	9	9	51	38	+13	33	Qualification for Cup Winners' Cup first round
7	Chernomorets Burgas	30	11	8	11	41	50	−9	30	
8	Lokomotiv G. Oryahovitsa	30	13	3	14	42	39	+3	29	
9	Beroe Stara Zagora	30	10	7	13	38	41	−3	27	
10	Minyor Pernik	30	10	7	13	36	44	−8	27	

Source: rsssf.com

=== Bulgarian Cup ===
==== 1/16 finals ====
Levski Sofia	5–0	Lokomotiv GO	Sofia

Lokomotiv GO	0–1	Levski Sofia	Lokomotiv GO

Lokomotiv GO loss with aggregate: 0–6.
