= 1984–85 Bulgarian Cup =

Tournament details
- Country: Bulgaria

Final positions
- Champions: CSKA Sofia (11th cup)
- Runners-up: Levski Sofia

The 1984–85 Bulgarian Cup was the 45th season of the Bulgarian Cup. CSKA Sofia won the competition, beating Levski Sofia 2–1 in the final at the Vasil Levski National Stadium in Sofia.

== First round ==
Team 1	Agg.	Team 2	1st leg	2nd leg
1984
Lokomotiv Sofia	7–2	Spartak Plovdiv	6–0	1–2
Slavia Sofia	6–2	Litex Lovech	4–1	2–1
Pirin Blagoevgrad	2–3	Lokomotiv Plovdiv	2–0	0–3
Dobrudzha Dobrich	3–5	Shumen	1–1	2–4
Minyor Pernik	3–5	Dunav Ruse	3–1	0–4
Ludogorets Razgrad	2–1	Akademik Svishtov	2–1	0–0
Etar Veliko Tarnovo	15–3	Dulovo	11–2	4–1
Yantra Gabrovo	3–6	Cherno More Varna	3–2	0–4
Haskovo	7–2	Pavlikeni	4–1	3–1
Chirpan	4–3	Lokomotiv Ruse	3–1	1–2
Belasitsa Petrich	3–4	Arda Kardzhali	3–1	0–3
Spartak Pleven	6–2	Svetkavitsa	4–0	2–2
Vihren Sandanski	5–3	Botev Vratsa	3–1	2–2
Neftochimic Burgas	6–4	Zagorets Nova Zagora	2–1	4–3
Chernomorets Burgas	5–0	Nesebar	3–0	2–0
Kremikovtsi	4–2	Montana	4–0	0–2
Pirin Gotse Delchev	4–4 (a)	Marek Dupnitsa	3–2	1–2
Preslav	2–4	Rila	2–0	0–4
Lokomotiv GO	2–6	Beroe Stara Zagora	1–2	1–4
Hebros Harmanli	4–2	Chavdar Troyan	1–0	3–2
Sportist G. Toshevo	2–3	Balkan Botevgrad	0–0	2–3
Rozova Dolina	2–1	Kaliakra Kavarna	2–1	0–0
Kubrat	5–9	Spartak Varna	3–4	2–5
Dimitrovgrad	5–2	Velbazhd Kyustendil	4–0	1–2

== Second round ==
Team 1	Agg.	Team 2	1st leg	2nd leg
1984
Dimitrovgrad	3–3 (a)	Lokomotiv Sofia	2–3	1–0
Rila	3–5	Chernomorets Burgas	2–2	1–3
Ludogorets Razgrad	2–3	Chirpan	1–0	1–3
Dunav Ruse	1–2	Marek Dupnitsa	0–0	1–2
Cherno More Varna	3–2	Spartak Varna	1–2	2–0
Hebros Harmanli	2–1	Arda Kardzhali	2–0	0–1
Rozova Dolina	0–2	Beroe Stara Zagora	0–0	0–2
Lokomotiv Plovdiv	4–2	Balkan Botevgrad	3–0	1–2
Haskovo	2–4	Shumen	2–0	0–4
Etar Veliko Tarnovo	4–3	Vihren Sandanski	3–1	1–2
Kremikovtsi	2–5	Neftochimic Burgas	1–1	1–4
Slavia Sofia	4–11	Spartak Pleven	1–4	3–7

== Third round ==
In this round include the four teams, who participated in the European tournaments (CSKA, Levski, Botev Plovdiv and Sliven).

Team 1	Agg.	Team 2	1st leg	2nd leg
January 1985
Beroe Stara Zagora	0–2	Cherno More Varna	0–0	0–2
Botev Plovdiv	7–0	Shumen	5–0	2–0
Marek Dupnitsa	1–2	Etar Veliko Tarnovo	1–1	0–1
Hebros Harmanli	3–6	Levski Sofia	1–2	2–4
Lokomotiv Sofia	2–3	Lokomotiv Plovdiv	1–2	1–1
Sliven	6–2	Neftochimic Burgas	4–1	2–1
Chernomorets Burgas	3–4	CSKA Sofia	1–1	2–3
Spartak Pleven	1–2	Chirpan	0–0	1–2

== Quarter-finals ==
Team 1	Agg.	Team 2	1st leg	2nd leg
26 January / 16 February 1985
Chirpan	0–9	CSKA Sofia	0–4	0–5
Etar Veliko Tarnovo	2–4	Levski Sofia	2–2	0–2
Cherno More Varna	6–8	Botev Plovdiv	5–2	1–6
Lokomotiv Plovdiv	4–4 (a)	Sliven	1–1	3–3

== Semi-finals ==
Team 1	Agg.	Team 2	1st leg	2nd leg
28 February / 13 March 1985
Levski Sofia	5–2	Botev Plovdiv	3–2	2–0
Lokomotiv Plovdiv	3–6	CSKA Sofia	0–4	3–2

== Final ==
=== Details ===
19 June 1985

CSKA Sofia	2–1	Levski Sofia
Slavkov 26'; Voynov 53'		Sirakov 82' (pen.)

Vasil Levski National Stadium, Sofia
Attendance: 35,000
Referee: Ahmed Yasharov (Sofia)

CSKA	Levski
