= 1983–84 Bulgarian Cup =

Tournament details
- Country: Bulgaria

Final positions
- Champions: Levski Sofia (15th cup)
- Runners-up: Botev Plovdiv

Tournament statistics
- Top goal scorer(s): Kamen Petkov (Rozova Dolina) (8 goals)

The 1983–84 Bulgarian Cup was the 44th season of the Bulgarian Cup. Levski Sofia won the competition, beating Botev Plovdiv 1–0 in the final at the Druzhba Stadium in Kardzhali.

== First round ==
Team 1	Agg.	Team 2	1st leg	2nd leg
October 1983
Armeets Sofia	3–3 (2–3 p)	Belasitsa Petrich	2–1	1–2 (a.e.t.)
Asenovets Asenovgrad	1–5	Neftochimic Burgas	1–2	0–3
Beloslav	2–1	Svetkavitsa	2–0	0–1
Yantra Gabrovo	0–5	Dunav Ruse	0–0	0–5
Dobrudzha Dobrich	2–3	Litex Lovech	2–1	0–2
Rilski Sportist	3–4	Arda Kardzhali	3–0	0–4
Tryavna	3–1	Metalurg Pernik	1–0	2–1
Botev Ihtiman	3–6	Rozova Dolina	1–1	2–5
Marek Dupnitsa	0–4	Slavia Sofia	0–1	0–3
Balkan Botevgrad	2–6	Chernomorets Burgas	1–3	1–3
Shumen	5–2	Beroe Stara Zagora	3–1	2–1
Lokomotiv GO	2–8	Botev Plovdiv	0–3	2–5
Maritsa Plovdiv	5–6	Minyor Pernik	5–2	0–4
Chernolomets Popovo	6–6 (a)	Zagorets Nova Zagora	6–3	0–3
Spartak Pleven	9–3	Chavdar Troyan	5–1	4–2
Vihren Sandanski	1–2	Botev Vratsa	0–1	1–1
Pirin Gotse Delchev	1–2	Chirpan	1–0	0–2
Bdin Vidin	2–3	Haskovo	1–2	1–1
Pirin Blagoevgrad	2–3	Lokomotiv Sofia	1–0	1–3
Sportist G. Toshevo	3–1	Dorostol Silistra	2–0	1–1
Lokomotiv Mezdra	3–1	Hebar Pazardzhik	3–0	0–1
Akademik Svishtov	0–4	Sliven	0–3	0–1
Montana	0–3	Etar Veliko Tarnovo	0–2	0–1
Ludogorets Razgrad	5–2	Cherno More Varna	3–2	2–0

== Second round ==
Team 1	Agg.	Team 2	1st leg	2nd leg
Slavia Sofia	1–5	Chernomorets Burgas	1–0	0–5
Zagorets Nova Zagora	6–2	Minyor Pernik	3–1	3–1
Beloslav	0–4	Dunav Ruse	0–1	0–3
Ludogorets Razgrad	1–5	Etar Veliko Tarnovo	0–3	1–2
Belasitsa Petrich	6–3	Neftochimic Burgas	6–2	0–1
Spartak Pleven	3–4	Botev Vratsa	3–0	0–4
Lokomotiv Mezdra	2–14	Sliven	0–3	2–11
Chirpan	3–5	Haskovo	3–1	0–4
Tryavna	4–7	Rozova Dolina	2–1	2–6
Shumen	2–3	Botev Plovdiv	2–0	0–3
Litex Lovech	3–2	Arda Kardzhali	2–0	1–2
Sportist G. Toshevo	0–7	Lokomotiv Sofia	0–6	0–1

== Third round ==
In this round include the four teams, who participated in the European tournaments (CSKA, Levski, Spartak Varna and Lokomotiv Plovdiv).

Team 1	Agg.	Team 2	1st leg	2nd leg
20/26 February 1984
Belasitsa Petrich	3–1	Botev Vratsa	2–0	1–1
Sliven	7–8	Haskovo	5–3	2–5
Botev Plovdiv	3–2	Litex Lovech	2–0	1–2
Chernomorets Burgas	10–0	Zagorets Nova Zagora	6–0	4–0
Levski Sofia	7–0	Lokomotiv Plovdiv	2–0	5–0
Dunav Ruse	2–6	Etar Veliko Tarnovo	1–3	1–3
Rozova Dolina	2–7	CSKA Sofia	1–2	1–5
Spartak Varna	2–0	Lokomotiv Sofia	1–0	1–0

== Quarter-finals ==
Team 1	Agg.	Team 2	1st leg	2nd leg
Belasitsa Petrich	3–5	Haskovo	2–1	1–4
Botev Plovdiv	3–2	Chernomorets Burgas	2–1	1–1
Etar Veliko Tarnovo	2–4	Levski Sofia	1–1	1–3
CSKA Sofia	7–1	Spartak Varna	6–0	1–1

== Semi-finals ==
Team 1	Score	Team 2	Place
31 March 1984
Levski Sofia	3–1	CSKA Sofia	Sofia
Botev Plovdiv	0–0 (a.e.t.) (4–3 p)	Haskovo	Sofia

== Final ==
=== Details ===
2 May 1984
17:00 EEST

Levski Sofia	1−0	Botev Plovdiv
Spasov 80' (pen.)

Druzhba Stadium, Kardzhali
Attendance: 30,000
Referee: Kiril Savov (Varna)

Levski	Botev
