= 1987–88 FC Lokomotiv Gorna Oryahovitsa season =

Lokomotiv GO
1987–88 season
- Manager: Dobromir Zhechev
- A PFG: 13th Place
- Bulgarian Cup: 1/16 finals
- Top goalscorer: Nako Doichev (9)

The 1987–88 season is FC Lokomotiv Gorna Oryahovitsa's 2nd season in A PFG.

== First-team squad ==
Note: Flags indicate national team as defined under FIFA eligibility rules; some limited exceptions apply. Players may hold more than one non-FIFA nationality.

No.	Pos.	Nation	Player
—	GK	(Bulgaria) BUL	Toshko Arsov 25/0
—	DF	(Bulgaria) BUL	Levent Gavazov 30/0
—	DF	(Bulgaria) BUL	Manol Manolov 27/0
—	DF	(Bulgaria) BUL	Angel Chervenkov 27/0
—	MF	(Bulgaria) BUL	Ljubomir Rusev 28/3
—	MF	(Bulgaria) BUL	Dimitar Pechikamakov 29/7
—	MF	(Bulgaria) BUL	Boris Iliev 26/7
—	FW	(Bulgaria) BUL	Valeri Ganev 26/4
—	MF	(Bulgaria) BUL	Nikola Velkov 25/6
—	FW	(Bulgaria) BUL	Asan Abishev 24/3

No.	Pos.	Nation	Player
—	GK	(Bulgaria) BUL	Valeri Milkov 3/0
—	DF	(Bulgaria) BUL	Angel Minchev 27/0
—	FW	(Bulgaria) BUL	Nako Doichev 21/9
—	MF	(Bulgaria) BUL	Tsenko Gavazov 25/0
—	FW	(Bulgaria) BUL	Hristo Kanchev 13/1
—	MF	(Bulgaria) BUL	Ljubomir Zhelev 10/1
—	DF	(Bulgaria) BUL	Petar Bikarski 6/0
—	GK	(Bulgaria) BUL	Iliyan Petkov 3/0

== Fixtures ==
=== League ===
The team is finished 13th after 30 games in his second "A"group's season.

08.08.1987 1	Pirin Blagoevgrad	2–1	Lokomotiv GO	Blagoevgrad

15.08.1987 2	Lokomotiv GO	4–1	Beroe	Gorna Oryahovitsa

22.08.1987 3	Sliven	1–0	Lokomotiv GO	Sliven

30.08.1987 4	Lokomotiv GO	1–2	Levski	Gorna Oryahovitsa

06.09.1987 5	Lokomotiv Plovdiv	4–3	Lokomotiv GO	Plovdiv

12.09.1987 6	Lokomotiv GO	1–0	Etar	Gorna Oryahovitsa
	Nako Doichev 53'

26.09.1987 7	Minyor Pernik	3–1	Lokomotiv GO	Pernik

04.10.1987 8	Lokomotiv GO	3–2	Lokomotiv Sofia	Gorna Oryahovitsa

18.10.1987 9	Botev Vratsa	1–1	Lokomotiv GO	Vratsa

25.10.1987 10	Lokomotiv GO	2–0	Spartak Varna	Gorna Oryahovitsa

31.10.1987 11	Spartak Pleven	2–1	Lokomotiv GO	Pleven

18.11.1987 12	Lokomotiv GO	2–1	Botev Plovdiv	Gorna Oryahovitsa

22.11.1987 13	CSKA Sofia	4–0	Lokomotiv GO	Sofia

28.11.1987 14	Chernomorets Burgas	4–0	Lokomotiv GO	Burgas

05.12.1987 15	Lokomotiv GO	2–1	Slavia Sofia	Gorna Oryahovitsa
	Nako Doichev 19'; Dimitar Pechikamakov 75'		Bojkov 52'

20.02.1988 16	Lokomotiv GO	1–1	Pirin Blagoevgrad	Gorna Oryahovitsa

27.02.1988 17	Beroe	1–0	Lokomotiv GO	Stara Zagora

05.03.1988 18	Lokomotiv GO	1–0	Sliven	Gorna Oryahovitsa

13.03.1988 19	Levski	3–0	Lokomotiv GO	Sofia

19.03.1988 20	Lokomotiv GO	2–0	Lokomotiv Plovdiv	Gorna Oryahovitsa

26.03.1988 21	Etar	1–1	Lokomotiv GO	Veliko Tarnovo

02.04.1988 22	Lokomotiv GO	2–0	Minyor Pernik	Gorna Oryahovitsa

09.04.1988 23	Lokomotiv Sofia	3–1	Lokomotiv GO	Sofia

17.04.1988 24	Lokomotiv GO	2–0	Botev Vratsa	Gorna Oryahovitsa

23.04.1988 25	Spartak Varna	2–0	Lokomotiv GO	Varna

01.05.1988 26	Lokomotiv GO	1–3	Spartak Pleven	Gorna Oryahovitsa

07.05.1988 27	Botev Plovdiv	3–1	Lokomotiv GO	Plovdiv

15.05.1988 28	Lokomotiv GO	2–5	CSKA Sofia	Gorna Oryahovitsa

21.05.1988 29	Lokomotiv GO	3–2	Chernomorets Burgas	Gorna Oryahovitsa

28.05.1988 30	Slavia Sofia	5–2	Lokomotiv GO	Sofia

== League standings ==
Pos	Team	Pld	W	D	L	GF	GA	GD	Pts	Qualification or relegation
11	Minyor Pernik	30	10	5	15	34	36	−2	25	
12	Pirin Blagoevgrad	30	7	11	12	32	37	−5	25	
13	Lokomotiv G. Oryahovitsa	30	11	3	16	41	57	−16	25	
14	Vratsa	30	8	8	14	34	46	−12	24	
15	Chernomorets Burgas (R)	30	9	3	18	27	50	−23	21	Relegation to 1988–89 B Group

Source: rsssf.com
(R) Relegated
