= 1989–90 FC Lokomotiv Gorna Oryahovitsa season =

Lokomotiv GO
1989–90 season
- Manager: Kiril Rabchev
- A PFG: 8th
- Top goalscorer: Georgi Todorov (9)

The 1989–90 season was FC Lokomotiv Gorna Oryahovitsa's fourth season in A PFG.

== First-team squad ==
Note: Flags indicate national team as defined under FIFA eligibility rules; some limited exceptions apply. Players may hold more than one non-FIFA nationality.

No.	Pos.	Nation	Player
—	GK	(Bulgaria) BUL	Toshko Arsov 22/0
—	DF	(Bulgaria) BUL	Levent Gavazov 29/0
—	DF	(Bulgaria) BUL	Manol Manolov 27/0
—	DF	(Bulgaria) BUL	Stefan Kolev 29/0
—	MF	(Bulgaria) BUL	Yordan Marinov 27/4
—	MF	(Bulgaria) BUL	Dimitar Pechikamakov 19/1
—	MF	(Bulgaria) BUL	Shefket Mustafov 26/2
—	FW	(Bulgaria) BUL	Valeri Ganev 26/5
—	MF	(Bulgaria) BUL	Tsvetan Galev 3/0
—	FW	(Bulgaria) BUL	Asan Abishev 3/0
—	DF	(Bulgaria) BUL	Sasho Angelov 29/3
—	MF	(Bulgaria) BUL	Hristo Mihaylov 1/0

No.	Pos.	Nation	Player
—	GK	(Bulgaria) BUL	Emil Mihaylov 5/0
—	DF	(Bulgaria) BUL	Angel Minchev 17/0
—	FW	(Bulgaria) BUL	Ivaylo Yordanov 22/2
—	MF	(Bulgaria) BUL	Tsenko Gavazov 8/0
—	FW	(Bulgaria) BUL	Georgi Todorov 30/9
—	MF	(Bulgaria) BUL	Nazif Kadir 12/0
—	DF	(Bulgaria) BUL	Tsvetan Nedyalkov 10/0
—	DF	(Bulgaria) BUL	Savcho Savchev 6/0
—	MF	(Bulgaria) BUL	Marin Baychev 1/1
—	DF	(Bulgaria) BUL	Georgi Djondjorov 14/0
—	MF	(Bulgaria) BUL	Yordan Petkov 9/0

== Fixtures ==
=== League ===
The team is finished 8th after 30 games in his fourth "A"group's season.

12.08.1989 1	Lokomotiv GO	0–0	Beroe	Gorna Oryahovitsa

19.08.1989 2	Etar	2–0	Lokomotiv GO	Veliko Tarnovo

26.08.1989 3	Lokomotiv GO	1–0	Botev Plovdiv	Gorna Oryahovitsa

03.09.1989 4	Lokomotiv Sofia	1–0	Lokomotiv GO	Sofia

08.09.1989 5	Lokomotiv GO	1–1	Levski	Gorna Oryahovitsa

23.09.1989 6	Chernomorets Burgas	2–2	Lokomotiv GO	Burgas
			Ivaylo Yordanov

30.09.1989 7	Lokomotiv GO	1–0	Cherno More	Gorna Oryahovitsa

14.10.1989 8	Pirin Blagoevgrad	6–0	Lokomotiv GO	Blagoevgrad

21.10.1989 9	Lokomotiv GO	1–0	Dunav Ruse	Gorna Oryahovitsa

25.10.1989 10	Lokomotiv GO	1–0	Lokomotiv Plovdiv	Gorna Oryahovitsa

28.10.1989 11	CSKA Sofia	2–0	Lokomotiv GO	Sofia

04.11.1989 12	Lokomotiv GO	2–0	Botev Vratsa	Gorna Oryahovitsa

18.11.1989 13	Slavia Sofia	2–1	Lokomotiv GO	Sofia

25.11.1989 14	Lokomotiv GO	3–1	Hebar Pazardzhik	Gorna Oryahovitsa

02.12.1989 15	Sliven	3–1	Lokomotiv GO	Sliven

24.02.1990 16	Beroe	0–0	Lokomotiv GO	Stara Zagora

03.03.1990 17	Lokomotiv GO	1–0	Etar	Gorna Oryahovitsa

10.03.1990 18	Botev Plovdiv	1–0	Lokomotiv GO	Plovdiv

17.03.1990 19	Lokomotiv GO	1–1	Lokomotiv Sofia	Gorna Oryahovitsa

24.03.1990 20	Levski	1–0	Lokomotiv GO	Sofia

31.03.1990 21	Lokomotiv GO	2–0	Chernomorets Burgas	Gorna Oryahovitsa

07.04.1990 22	Cherno More	2–1	Lokomotiv GO	Varna

14.04.1990 23	Lokomotiv GO	1–1	Pirin Blagoevgrad	Gorna Oryahovitsa

21.04.1990 24	Dunav Ruse	0–0	Lokomotiv GO	Ruse

28.04.1990 25	Lokomotiv Plovdiv	2–1	Lokomotiv GO	Plovdiv

02.05.1990 26	Lokomotiv GO	1–1	CSKA Sofia	Gorna Oryahovitsa

12.05.1990 27	Botev Vratsa	0–1	Lokomotiv GO	Vratsa
			Georgi Todorov

19.05.1990 28	Lokomotiv GO	3–2	Slavia Sofia	Gorna Oryahovitsa

26.05.1990 29	Hebar Pazardzhik	1–0	Lokomotiv GO	Pazardzhik

02.06.1990 30	Lokomotiv GO	2–0	Sliven	Gorna Oryahovitsa

== League standings ==
Pos	Team	Pld	W	D	L	GF	GA	GD	Pts	Qualification or relegation
6	Pirin Blagoevgrad	30	13	8	9	46	32	+14	34	
7	Trakia Plovdiv	30	15	3	12	43	39	+4	33	
8	Lokomotiv G. Oryahovitsa	30	11	8	11	28	32	−4	30	
9	Sliven	30	12	5	13	41	44	−3	29	Qualification for Cup Winners' Cup first round
10	Beroe Stara Zagora	30	10	9	11	43	48	−5	29	

Source: rsssf.com
