= 1988–89 B Group =

Season of the Bulgarian B Football Group

Bulgarian B Group
- Season: 1988–89
- Champions: Hebar
- Promoted: Hebar; Chernomorets
- Relegated: Akademik Sofia; Spartak Plovdiv; Lokomotiv Ruse; Arda
- Matches: 380
- Goals: 962 (2.53 per match)
- Top goalscorer: (Bulgaria) Vladimir Stoyanov (24 goals)

The 1988–89 B Group was the 33rd season of the Bulgarian B Football Group, the second tier of the Bulgarian football league system. A total of 20 teams contested the league.

== Teams ==
=== Stadiums and locations ===
Locations of the 1988–89 Bulgarian B Group teams

Team	City	Stadium	Capacity
Akademik	Sofia	Akademik (Sofia)	15,000
Akademik	Svishtov	Akademik (Svishtov)	13,500
Arda	Kardzhali	Druzhba (Kardzhali)	12,000
Bdin	Vidin	Georgi Benkovski	12,000
Chernomorets	Burgas	Deveti Septemvri	18,000
Cherveno Zname	Pavlikeni	Gradski	8,000
Dobrudzha	Dobrich	Druzhba (Dobrich)	16,000
Haskovo	Haskovo	Dimitar Kanev	14,000
Hebar	Pazardzhik	Lyuben Shkodrov	8,000
Lokomotiv	Ruse	Lokomotiv (Ruse)	8,000
Lokomotiv	Stara Zagora	Lokomotiv (St. Zagora)	10,000
Ludogorets	Razgrad	Dyanko Stefanov	8,000
Osam	Lovech	Hristo Karpachev	12,000
Rila	Dupnitsa	Bonchuk	22,000
Shumen	Shumen	Panayot Volov	28,000
Spartak	Pleven	Spartak (Pleven)	15,000
Spartak	Plovdiv	Spartak (Plovdiv)	10,000
Tundzha	Yambol	Nikola Laskov	12,000
Vihren	Sandanski	Vihren	8,000
Yantra	Gabrovo	Hristo Botev	12,000

=== Personnel ===
Team	Manager	Captain
Akademik Sofia	(Bulgaria) Milen Goranov	(Bulgaria) Biser Velkov
Akademik Svishtov	(Bulgaria) Asen Milushev	(Bulgaria) Todor Borisov
Arda	(Bulgaria) Vasil Ankov	(Bulgaria) Hristo Topalov
Bdin	(Bulgaria) Ivan Tsvetkov	(Bulgaria) Toshko Borisov
Chernomorets	(Bulgaria) Evgeni Yanchovski	(Bulgaria) Lyubomir Sheytanov
Cherveno Zname	(Bulgaria) Kiril Furnigov	(Bulgaria) Angel Stefanov
Dobrudzha	(Bulgaria) Kurti Nedev	(Bulgaria) Ivan Georgiev
Haskovo	(Bulgaria) Pavel Panov	(Bulgaria) Yuliyan Minchev
Hebar	(Bulgaria) Kiril Vaglarov	(Bulgaria) Lazar Dimitrov
Lokomotiv Ruse	(Bulgaria) Nikola Hristov	(Bulgaria) Iliya Yankov
Lokomotiv Stara Zagora	(Bulgaria) Ivan Tanev	(Bulgaria) Tanko Tanev
Ludogorets	(Bulgaria) Grigor Petkov	(Bulgaria) Ruzhin Ananiev
Osam	(Bulgaria) Kiril Ivkov	(Bulgaria) Petar Hubchev
Rila	(Bulgaria) Sasho Pargov	(Bulgaria) Vasil Gizdov
Shumen	(Bulgaria) Todor Todorov	(Bulgaria) Stoyan Cheshmedzhiev
Spartak Pleven	(Bulgaria) Stefan Velichkov	(Bulgaria) Ventsislav Gochev
Spartak Plovdiv	(Bulgaria) Atanas Marinov	(Bulgaria) Ivan Marinov
Tundzha	(Bulgaria) Petko Nikolov	(Bulgaria) Ivan Penchev
Vihren	(Bulgaria) Todor Nikolov	(Bulgaria) Todor Mechev
Yantra	(Bulgaria) Todor Todorov	(Bulgaria) Vesko Ganchev

== League table ==
Pos	Team	Pld	W	D	L	GF	GA	GD	Pts	Promotion or relegation
1	Hebar Pazardzhik (P)	38	23	6	9	66	38	+28	52	Promotion to 1989–90 A Group
2	Chernomorets Burgas (P)	38	20	10	8	63	32	+31	50	Promotion to 1989–90 A Group
3	Osam Lovech	38	21	5	12	50	27	+23	47	
4	Dobrudzha Dobrich	38	18	10	10	46	31	+15	46	
5	Akademik Svishtov	38	16	12	10	45	30	+15	44	
6	Shumen	38	16	9	13	49	37	+12	41	
7	Haskovo	38	14	12	12	59	41	+18	40	
8	Yantra Gabrovo	38	18	4	16	47	52	−5	40	
9	Vihren Sandanski	38	15	9	14	43	47	−4	39	
10	Lokomotiv Stara Zagora	38	17	4	17	56	61	−5	38	
11	Spartak Pleven	38	16	5	17	61	48	+13	37	
12	Tundzha Yambol	38	14	9	15	43	46	−3	37	
13	Bdin Vidin	38	13	11	14	41	50	−9	37	
14	Ludogorets Razgrad	38	15	4	19	51	62	−11	34	
15	Cherveno Zname Pavlikeni	38	13	7	18	45	62	−17	33	
16	Rila Dupnitsa	38	15	3	20	39	59	−20	33	
17	Akademik Sofia (R)	38	9	14	15	38	48	−10	32	Relegation to 1989–90 V Group
18	Spartak Plovdiv (R)	38	11	8	19	43	60	−17	30	Relegation to 1989–90 V Group
19	Lokomotiv Ruse (R)	38	12	2	24	39	56	−17	26	Relegation to 1989–90 V Group
20	Arda Kardzhali (R)	38	8	8	22	38	75	−37	24	Relegation to 1989–90 V Group

Source: 1989 Football retro-football.bg
Rules for classification: 1) points; 2) goal difference; 3) number of goals scored.
(P) Promoted; (R) Relegated

== Top scorers ==
Rank	Scorer	Club	Goals
1	(Bulgaria) Vladimir Stoyanov	Chernomorets Burgas	24
2	(Bulgaria) Stanimir Stoilov	Haskovo	23
3	(Bulgaria) Blagovest Petkov	Spartak Pleven	18
4	(Bulgaria) Plamen Linkov	Osam Lovech	16
4	(Bulgaria) Kostadin Avramov	Shumen / Lokomotiv Ruse	16
4	(Bulgaria) Simeon Chilibonov	Chernomorets Burgas	16
7	(Bulgaria) Yuliyan Minchev	Haskovo	14
7	(Bulgaria) Georgi Tsvetanov	Spartak Pleven	14
7	(Bulgaria) Valentin Ignatov	Akademik Svishtov	14
7	(Bulgaria) Rafi Rafiev	Ludogorets	14
7	(Bulgaria) Demir Demirev	Ludogorets	14
