= 1988–89 Bulgarian Cup =

Tournament details
- Country: Bulgaria

Final positions
- Champions: CSKA Sofia (14th cup)
- Runners-up: Chernomorets Burgas

Tournament statistics
- Top goal scorer(s): V. Stoyanov (Chernomorets) (8 goals)

The 1988–89 Bulgarian Cup was the 49th season of the Bulgarian Cup. CSKA Sofia won the competition, beating Chernomorets Burgas 3–0 in the final at the Slavi Aleksiev Stadium in Pleven.

== First round ==
=== Group 1 ===
Team 1	Agg.	Team 2	1st leg	2nd leg
7 / 14 September 1988
Botev Vratsa	7–2	Yantra Gabrovo	5–0	2–2
Bdin Vidin	3–2	Akademik Svishtov	3–0	0–2
6 / 27 October 1988
Bdin Vidin	0–4	Botev Vratsa	0–1	0–3
Yantra Gabrovo	2–5	Akademik Svishtov	1–2	1–3

- Yantra Gabrovo was eliminated.

=== Group 2 ===
Team 1	Agg.	Team 2	1st leg	2nd leg
7 / 14 September 1988
Spartak Plovdiv	4–6	Lokomotiv Sofia	2–0	2–6
Vihren Sandanski	2–3	Minyor Pernik	2–1	0–2
6 / 27 October 1988
Lokomotiv Sofia	1–3	Minyor Pernik	1–1	0–2
Vihren Sandanski	6–1	Spartak Plovdiv	4–1	2–0

- Spartak Plovdiv was eliminated.

=== Group 3 ===
Team 1	Agg.	Team 2	1st leg	2nd leg
7 / 14 September 1988
Hebar Pazardzhik	2–0	Lokomotiv Plovdiv	2–0	0–0
Akademik Sofia	2–4	Pirin Blagoevgrad	1–3	1–1
6 / 27 October 1988
Hebar Pazardzhik	2–1	Pirin Blagoevgrad	1–0	1–1
Akademik Sofia	0–4	Lokomotiv Plovdiv	0–0	0–4

- Akademik Sofia was eliminated.

=== Group 4 ===
Team 1	Agg.	Team 2	1st leg	2nd leg
7 / 14 September 1988
Litex Lovech	0–5	Spartak Pleven	0–2	0–3
Pavlikeni	2–6	Etar Veliko Tarnovo	1–2	1–4
6 / 27 October 1988
Spartak Pleven	5–6	Etar Veliko Tarnovo	2–2	3–4
Pavlikeni	2–3	Litex Lovech	1–0	1–3

- Pavlikeni was eliminated.

=== Group 5 ===
Team 1	Agg.	Team 2	1st leg	2nd leg
7 / 14 September 1988
Shumen	3–2	Dunav Ruse	2–0	1–2
Ludogorets Razgrad	6–2	Cherno More Varna	5–0	1–2
6 / 27 October 1988
Shumen	4–5	Ludogorets Razgrad	2–2	2–3
Cherno More Varna	2–5	Dunav Ruse	1–2	1–3

- Cherno More Varna was eliminated.

=== Group 6 ===
Team 1	Agg.	Team 2	1st leg	2nd leg
7 / 14 September 1988
Spartak Varna	4–2	Dobrudzha Dobrich	4–1	0–1
Lokomotiv GO	6–3	Lokomotiv Ruse	4–3	2–0
6 / 27 October 1988
Spartak Varna	5–3	Lokomotiv GO	1–1	4–2
Lokomotiv Ruse	3–2	Dobrudzha Dobrich	3–1	0–1

- Dobrudzha Dobrich was eliminated.

=== Group 7 ===
Team 1	Agg.	Team 2	1st leg	2nd leg
7 / 14 September 1988
Lokomotiv StZ	6–6(a)	Sliven	6–1	0–5
Marek Dupnitsa	4–5	Tundzha Yambol	3–1	1–4
6 / 27 October 1988
Sliven	2–3	Tundzha Yambol	1–1	1–2
Marek Dupnitsa	2–4	Lokomotiv StZ	2–2	0–2

- Marek Dupnitsa was eliminated.

=== Group 8 ===
Team 1	Agg.	Team 2	1st leg	2nd leg
7 / 14 September 1988
Haskovo	3–5	Chernomorets Burgas	2–1	1–4 (aet)
Arda Kardzhali	2–6	Beroe Stara Zagora	2–2	0–4
6 / 27 October 1988
Chernomorets Burgas	6–4	Beroe Stara Zagora	3–3	3–1
Arda Kardzhali	2–4	Haskovo	1–1	1–3

- Arda Kardzhali was eliminated.

== Second round ==
Team 1	Agg.	Team 2	1st leg	2nd leg
16 / 23 November 1988
Vihren Sandanski	0–5	Lokomotiv Sofia	0–2	0–3
Pirin Blagoevgrad	3–2	Bdin Vidin	2–2	1–0
Lokomotiv StZ	3–5	Botev Vratsa	3–1	0–4
Minyor Pernik	0–1	Hebar Pazardzhik	0–0	0–1
Lokomotiv Plovdiv	3–9	Sliven	2–3	1–6
Etar Veliko Tarnovo	7–2	Spartak Pleven	4–1	3–1
Akademik Svishtov	4–3	Tundzha Yambol	2–0	2–3
Haskovo	4–5	Beroe Stara Zagora	3–1	1–4
Lokomotiv GO	2–1	Lokomotiv Ruse	1–0	1–1
Litex Lovech	5–3	Ludogorets Razgrad	4–1	1–2
Spartak Varna	3–4	Chernomorets Burgas	2–1	1–3
Dunav Ruse	2–1	Shumen	1–0	1–1

== Third round ==
In this round include the four teams, who participated in the European tournaments (CSKA, Levski, Botev Plovdiv and Slavia)

Team 1	Score	Team 2
10 December 1988
Hebar Pazardzhik	2–0	Lokomotiv GO
Litex Lovech	0–2	CSKA Sofia
Botev Plovdiv	1–0	Lokomotiv Sofia
Levski Sofia	3–1	Etar Veliko Tarnovo
Botev Vratsa	1–0 (a.e.t.)	Beroe Stara Zagora
Akademik Svishtov	0–1	Slavia Sofia
Chernomorets Burgas	1–0	Sliven
Pirin Blagoevgrad	1–1 (a.e.t.) (4–5 p)	Dunav Ruse

== Quarter-finals ==
Team 1	Score	Team 2
16-17 December 1988
Dunav Ruse	0–1	CSKA Sofia
Hebar Pazardzhik	1–5	Levski Sofia
Chernomorets Burgas	2–1	Botev Vratsa
14 February 1989
Botev Plovdiv	1–0 (a.e.t.)	Slavia Sofia

== Semi-finals ==
Team 1	Score	Team 2	Place
18 February 1989
Chernomorets Burgas	3–1	Levski Sofia	Haskovo
CSKA Sofia	6–0	Botev Plovdiv	Blagoevgrad

== Third place play-off ==
Team 1	Score	Team 2	Place
1989
Botev Plovdiv	3–5	Levski Sofia	Samokov

== Final ==
=== Details ===
24 May 1989

CSKA Sofia	3–0	Chernomorets Burgas
Kostadinov 44'; Stoichkov 50'; Tanev 59'

Slavi Aleksiev Stadium, Pleven
Attendance: 15,000
Referee: Stefan Chakarov (Veliko Tarnovo)

CSKA	Chernomorets
