= 1963–64 FC Lokomotiv Gorna Oryahovitsa season =

Lokomotiv GO
1963–64 season
- Manager: (Bulgaria) Yordan Tomov
- A PFG: 16th
- Soviet Army Cup: 1/8 finals
- Top goalscorer: (Bulgaria) Todor Marinov (9)
- Biggest win: 5:2 (vs Botev Plovdiv); 3:0 (vs Lokomotiv Ruse); 3:0 (vs Levski Sofia)
- Biggest defeat: 0:4 (vs CSKA Sofia); 1:5 (vs Marek Dupnitsa)

The 1963–64 season is FC Lokomotiv Gorna Oryahovitsa's 1st season in A PFG.

== First-team squad ==
Note: Flags indicate national team as defined under FIFA eligibility rules; some limited exceptions apply. Players may hold more than one non-FIFA nationality.

No.	Pos.	Nation	Player
—	GK	BUL	Boyko Vanchev 27/0
—	GK	BUL	Marin Marinov 5/0
—	DF	BUL	Zarko Georgiev 30/0
—	DF	BUL	Zhelyazko Kolev 28/0
—	DF	BUL	Ivan Varbanov 26/0
—	DF	BUL	Ivan Atanasov 14/1
—	MF	BUL	Yordan Tsenov 30/0
—	MF	BUL	Atanas Bogdanov 20/0
—	MF	BUL	Hristo Paskalev 10/0
—	MF	BUL	Ivan Marinovski 10/0

No.	Pos.	Nation	Player
—	FW	BUL	Dobri Blaskov 28/3
—	FW	BUL	Bojin Bojinov 27/5
—	FW	BUL	Todor Marinov 26/9
—	FW	BUL	Vasil Simeonov 23/4
—	FW	BUL	Iliya Bojilov 21/2
—	FW	BUL	Marin Kushev 15/3
—	FW	BUL	Nikola Popov 9/1
—	FW	BUL	Petar Simov 3/0
—	FW	BUL	Dimitar Milev 2/1
—	FW	BUL	Nikola Asparuhov 1/0

== Fixtures ==
=== League ===
The team is finished 16th after 30 games in his first "A"group's season.

11 August 1963 Round 1	Spartak Pleven	2 – 1	Lokomotiv GO	Lovech
			Marin Kushev

18 August 1963 Round 2	Lokomotiv GO	1 – 0	Sliven	Gorna Oryahovitsa
	Nikola Popov

Round 3	Levski	2 – 0	Lokomotiv GO	Sofia

Round 4	Lokomotiv GO	5 – 2	Botev Plovdiv	Gorna Oryahovitsa
	Marin Kushev 30'; Bojin Bojinov 42'; Marin Kushev 47'; Todor Marinov 50'; Dimitar Milev 89'		Asparuhov 31'; Belchev 87'

Round 5	Spartak Varna	1 – 1	Lokomotiv GO	Varna

Round 6	Lokomotiv GO	1 – 0	Marek	Gorna Oryahovitsa

Round 7	Spartak Plovdiv	2 – 1	Lokomotiv GO	Plovdiv

Round 8	Lokomotiv GO	2 – 1	Slavia	Gorna Oryahovitsa

Round 9	CSKA	4 – 0	Lokomotiv GO	Sofia

Round 10	Lokomotiv GO	0 – 1	Beroe	Gorna Oryahovitsa

Round 11	Cherno more	3 – 0	Lokomotiv GO	Varna

Round 12	Lokomotiv GO	0 – 0	Spartak Sofia	Gorna Oryahovitsa

Round 13	Lokomotiv Plovdiv	2 – 1	Lokomotiv GO	Plovdiv

Round 14	Lokomotiv GO	2 – 1	Lokomotiv Sofia	Gorna Oryahovitsa

Round 15	Dunav Ruse	3 – 1	Lokomotiv GO	Ruse

Round 16	Lokomotiv GO	2 – 1	Spartak Pleven	Gorna Oryahovitsa

Round 17	Sliven	2 – 0	Lokomotiv GO	Sliven

Round 18	Lokomotiv GO	1 – 2	Levski	Gorna Oryahovitsa

Round 19	Botev Plovdiv	2 – 1	Lokomotiv GO	Plovdiv

Round 20	Lokomotiv GO	1 – 0	Spartak Varna	Gorna Oryahovitsa

Round 21	Marek	5 – 1	Lokomotiv GO	Dupnitsa

Round 22	Lokomotiv GO	1 – 1	Spartak Plovdiv	Gorna Oryahovitsa

Round 23	Slavia	4 – 1	Lokomotiv GO	Sofia

Round 24	Lokomotiv GO	1 – 0	CSKA	Gorna Oryahovitsa
	Ivan Atanasov

Round 25	Beroe	1 – 0	Lokomotiv GO	Stara Zagora

Round 26	Lokomotiv GO	1 – 1	Cherno more	Gorna Oryahovitsa

Round 27	Spartak Sofia	2 – 0	Lokomotiv GO	Sofia

Round 28	Lokomotiv GO	3 – 2	Lokomotiv Plovdiv	Gorna Oryahovitsa

Round 29	Lokomotiv Sofia	2 – 0	Lokomotiv GO	Sofia

Round 30	Lokomotiv GO	0 – 0	Dunav Ruse	Gorna Oryahovitsa

=== Cup ===
Only luck saved Levski Sofia from early elimination in Bulgarian Cup against Lokomotiv GO, after the outcome of the game was decided by penalties.

==== 1/16 finals ====
1963	Lokomotiv Ruse	0 – 3	Lokomotiv GO	Ruse

1963	Lokomotiv GO	2 – 1 (5–1 agg.)	Lokomotiv Ruse	Lokomotiv GO

==== 1/8 finals ====
1963	Lokomotiv GO	3 – 0	Levski Sofia	Gorna Oryahovitsa

1963	Levski Sofia	3 – 0 (3–3 agg.) (4–0 p)	Lokomotiv GO	Sofia

== League standings ==
Pos	Team	Pld	W	D	L	GF	GA	GD	Pts	Qualification or relegation
12	Spartak Sofia	30	8	9	13	28	40	−12	25	
13	Sliven	30	8	9	13	29	41	−12	25	
14	Beroe Stara Zagora	30	8	8	14	28	38	−10	24	
15	Spartak Varna (R)	30	9	6	15	34	52	−18	24	Relegation to 1964–65 B Group
16	Lokomotiv GO (R)	30	9	5	16	29	49	−20	23	Relegation to 1964–65 B Group

Source: rsssf.com
(R) Relegated
