= 1990–91 Bulgarian Cup =

Tournament details
- Country: Bulgaria

Final positions
- Champions: Levski Sofia (17th cup)
- Runners-up: Botev Plovdiv

Tournament statistics
- Top goal scorer(s): Petar Mihtarski (Levski) (7 goals)

The 1990–91 Bulgarian Cup was the 51st season of the Bulgarian Cup. Levski Sofia won the competition, beating Botev Plovdiv 2–1 in the final at the Ivaylo Stadium in Veliko Tarnovo.

== First round ==
In this round entered winners from the preliminary rounds together with the teams from B Group.

Team 1	Agg.	Team 2	1st leg	2nd leg
28 November / 5 December 1990
Spartak Pleven	8–2	Iskar Roman	6–1	2–1
Sportist General Toshevo	2–2 (a)	NSA Sofia	2–1	0–1
Dorostol Silistra	4–1	Cherno More Varna	2–0	2–1
Pirin Gotse Delchev	2–1	Botev Vratsa	1–0	1–1
Bdin Vidin	3–0	Spartak Plovdiv	3–0	0–0
Levski Karlovo	2–3	Akademik Sofia	2–0	0–3
Litex Lovech	2–2 (a)	Akademik Svishtov	2–2	0–0
Septemvri Tervel	1–3	Svetkavitsa	1–2	0–1
Dimitrovgrad	3–1	Pavlikeni	1–1	2–0
Rozova Dolina	2–6	Spartak Varna	2–2	0–4
Armeets Plovdiv	2–1	Nesebar	0–1	2–0
Hebar Pazardzhik	2–0	Lokomotiv Mezdra	2–0	0–0
Chumerna Elena	3–1	Velbazhd Kyustendil	3–0	0–1
Lokomotiv Ruse	4–2	Lokomotiv Dryanovo	4–1	0–1
Pirin Razlog	2–6	Strumska Slava	2–3	0–3
Dobrudzha Dobrich	2–1	Montana	0–0	2–1

== Second round ==
This round featured winners from the First Round and all 16 teams from A Group.

Team 1	Agg.	Team 2	1st leg	2nd leg
9 / 16 December 1990
Lokomotiv GO	0–6	Levski Sofia	0–1	0–5
Chernomorets Burgas	4–0	Spartak Pleven	4–0	0–0
Dorostol Silistra	1–3	Lokomotiv Sofia	0–0	1–3
Armeets Plovdiv	3–6	CSKA Sofia	2–3	1–3
Svetkavitsa	2–4	Hebar Pazardzhik	2–1	0–3
Dobrudzha Dobrich	2–6	Botev Plovdiv	1–1	1–5
Bdin Vidin	2–5	Yantra Gabrovo	2–0	0–5 (a.e.t.)
Akademik Sofia	2–4	Chumerna Elena	1–1	1–3
Dimitrovgrad	3–4	Spartak Varna	2–1	1–3
Strumska Slava	2–2 (5–6 p)	Lokomotiv Plovdiv	2–0	0–2 (a.e.t.)
Pirin Blagoevgrad	3–2	Lokomotiv Ruse	2–0	1–2
Slavia Sofia	4–1	NSA Sofia	2–0	2–1
Sliven	6–7	Akademik Svishtov	3–1	3–6
Beroe Stara Zagora	6–3	Minyor Pernik	3–3	3–0
Pirin Gotse Delchev	3–2	Haskovo	2–0	1–2
Dunav Ruse	2–3	Etar Veliko Tarnovo	1–0	1–3

== Group stage ==
=== Group 1 ===
Matches were played in Petrich and Sandanski

Team 1	Score	Team 2
10 February 1991
Botev Plovdiv	2–1	Chernomorets Burgas
Pirin Blagoevgrad	2–1	Akademik Svishtov
13 February 1991
Botev Plovdiv	1–0	Pirin Blagoevgrad
Chernomorets Burgas	1–1	Akademik Svishtov
16 February 1991
Botev Plovdiv	0–0	Akademik Svishtov
Chernomorets Burgas	1–0	Pirin Blagoevgrad

Pos	Team	Pld	W	D	L	GF	GA	GD	Pts	Qualification
1	Botev Plovdiv	3	2	1	0	3	1	+2	5	Semi-finals
2	Chernomorets Burgas	3	1	1	1	3	3	0	3	
3	Pirin Blagoevgrad	3	1	0	2	2	3	−1	2	
4	Akademik Svishtov	3	0	2	1	2	3	−1	2	

=== Group 2 ===
Matches were played in Nesebar, Balgarovo, Dolno Ezerovo and Pomorie

Team 1	Score	Team 2
10 February 1991
Slavia Sofia	4–0	Pirin Gotse Delchev
Lokomotiv Sofia	1–0	Lokomotiv Plovdiv
13 February 1991
Pirin Gotse Delchev	3–0	Lokomotiv Plovdiv
Lokomotiv Sofia	2–0	Slavia Sofia
16 February 1991
Lokomotiv Sofia	2–0	Pirin Gotse Delchev
Slavia Sofia	1–1	Lokomotiv Plovdiv

Pos	Team	Pld	W	D	L	GF	GA	GD	Pts	Qualification
1	Lokomotiv Sofia	3	3	0	0	5	0	+5	6	Semi-finals
2	Slavia Sofia	3	1	1	1	5	3	+2	3	
3	Pirin Gotse Delchev	3	1	0	2	3	6	−3	2	
4	Lokomotiv Plovdiv	3	0	1	2	1	5	−4	1	

=== Group 3 ===
Matches were played in Banya and Kazanlak

Team 1	Score	Team 2
10 February 1991
Etar Veliko Tarnovo	3–0	Spartak Varna
Beroe Stara Zagora	2–1	Yantra Gabrovo
13 February 1991
Yantra Gabrovo	4–0	Spartak Varna
Etar Veliko Tarnovo	0–0	Beroe Stara Zagora
16 February 1991
Etar Veliko Tarnovo	3–2	Yantra Gabrovo
Beroe Stara Zagora	2–1	Spartak Varna

Pos	Team	Pld	W	D	L	GF	GA	GD	Pts	Qualification
1	Etar Veliko Tarnovo	3	2	1	0	6	2	+4	5	Semi-finals
2	Beroe Stara Zagora	3	2	1	0	4	2	+2	5	
3	Yantra Gabrovo	3	1	0	2	7	5	+2	2	
4	Spartak Varna	3	0	0	3	1	9	−8	0	

=== Group 4 ===
Matches were played in Sliven and Yambol

Team 1	Score	Team 2
10 February 1991
CSKA Sofia	1–0	Chumerna Elena
Levski Sofia	1–0	Hebar Pazardzhik
13 February 1991
Hebar Pazardzhik	3–0	Chumerna Elena
Levski Sofia	2–0	CSKA Sofia
16 February 1991
Levski Sofia	3–1	Chumerna Elena
CSKA Sofia	2–0	Hebar Pazardzhik

Pos	Team	Pld	W	D	L	GF	GA	GD	Pts	Qualification
1	Levski Sofia	3	3	0	0	6	1	+5	6	Semi-finals
2	CSKA Sofia	3	2	0	1	3	2	+1	4	
3	Hebar Pazardzhik	3	1	0	2	3	3	0	2	
4	Chumerna Elena	3	0	0	3	1	7	−6	0	

== Semi-finals ==
Team 1	Agg.	Team 2	1st leg	2nd leg
3 April / 8 May 1991
Botev Plovdiv	4–1	Etar Veliko Tarnovo	3–0	1–1
Lokomotiv Sofia	3–5	Levski Sofia	2–3	1–2

== Final ==
=== Details ===
29 May 1991
18:00 EEST

Levski Sofia	2–1	Botev Plovdiv
Donkov 57'; Borimirov 80'		Yosifov 69'

Ivaylo Stadium, Veliko Tarnovo
Attendance: 10,000
Referee: Stefan Chakarov (Veliko Tarnovo)

Levski	Botev
