= 1991–92 Bulgarian Cup =

Tournament details
- Country: Bulgaria

Final positions
- Champions: Levski Sofia (18th cup)
- Runners-up: Pirin Blagoevgrad

Tournament statistics
- Top goal scorer(s): Stanimir Stoilov (Levski) (7 goals)

The 1991–92 Bulgarian Cup was the 52nd season of the Bulgarian Cup. Levski Sofia won the competition, beating Pirin Blagoevgrad 5–0 in the final at the Georgi Benkovski Stadium in Pazardzhik.

== First round ==
Team 1	Agg.	Team 2	1st leg	2nd leg
13 / 27 November 1991
Svilengrad	1–3	Dobrudzha Dobrich	1–0	0–3 (w/o)
Septemvri Sofia	4–2	Minyor Pernik	4–0	0–2
Yantra Gabrovo	2–0	Lokomotiv Plovdiv	2–0	0–0
Levski Sofia	5–0	Cherno More Varna	4–0	1–0
CSKA Sofia	4–2	Etar Veliko Tarnovo	4–1	0–1
Dunav Ruse	2–2 (a)	Sliven	2–1	0–1
Lokomotiv GO	3–6	Beroe Stara Zagora	2–1	1–5
Spartak Varna	3–8	Botev Plovdiv	2–3	1–5
Slavia Sofia	2–2 (a)	Dorostol Silistra	2–1	0–1
Chavdar Byala Slatina	2–14	Lokomotiv Sofia	1–3	1–11
Litex Lovech	1–2	Vidima-Rakovski	0–0	1–2
Hebar Pazardzhik	2–4	Rozova Dolina	1–1	1–3
Nesebar	0–7	Pirin Blagoevgrad	0–1	0–6
Chernomorets Burgas	2–2 (0–2 p)	Bdin Vidin	2–0	0–2 (a.e.t.)
Belasitsa Petrich	3–1	Haskovo	3–0	0–1
Minyor Radnevo	3–3 (a)	Zarya Krushari	3–1	0–2

== Second round ==
Team 1	Agg.	Team 2	1st leg	2nd leg
7 / 14 December 1991
Yantra Gabrovo	2–7	Sliven	2–3	0–4
Vidima-Rakovski	4–1	Septemvri Sofia	3–1	1–0
Levski Sofia	5–1	Dorostol Silistra	0–0	5–1
Belasitsa Petrich	3–9	Lokomotiv Sofia	1–4	2–5
Dobrudzha Dobrich	1–3	CSKA Sofia	1–1	0–2
Bdin Vidin	0–5	Botev Plovdiv	0–0	0–5
Rozova Dolina	3–8	Beroe Stara Zagora	1–2	2–6
Pirin Blagoevgrad	1–0	Zarya Krushari	0–0	1–0

== Quarter-finals ==
Team 1	Agg.	Team 2	1st leg	2nd leg
4 / 18 March 1992
Lokomotiv Sofia	4–2	Vidima-Rakovski	1–0	3–2
CSKA Sofia	2–3	Pirin Blagoevgrad	2–0	0–3
Botev Plovdiv	3–0	Sliven	0–0	3–0
Beroe Stara Zagora	0–8	Levski Sofia	0–3	0–5

== Semi-finals ==
Team 1	Agg.	Team 2	1st leg	2nd leg
1 / 15 April 1992
Levski Sofia	3–2	Botev Plovdiv	1–0	2–2
Pirin Blagoevgrad	2–2 (a)	Lokomotiv Sofia	1–0	1–2

== Final ==
=== Details ===
27 May 1992

Levski Sofia	5−0	Pirin Blagoevgrad
Stoilov 44' (pen.), 51'; G. Dimitrov 73'; Iliev 81'; Yotov 87'

Georgi Benkovski Stadium, Pazardzhik
Attendance: 10,000
Referee: Stefan Chakarov (Veliko Tarnovo)

Levski	Pirin
