= Velko Yotov =

Bulgarian footballer

Personal information
- Full name: Velko Nikolaev Yotov
- Date of birth: 26 August 1970 (age 56)
- Place of birth: Sofia, Bulgaria
- Height: 1.79 m (5 ft 10 in)
- Position: Forward

Senior career*
Years	Team	Apps	(Gls)
1988–1993	Levski Sofia	113	(31)
1993–1995	Espanyol	42	(14)
1995–1999	Newell's Old Boys	106	(35)
1999	Olimpik Teteven	6	(0)
2000–2001	Charleston Battery	29	(9)
2002–2005	Atlanta Silverbacks	72	(20)
Total		368	(109)

International career
1991–1995	Bulgaria	7	(0)
- * Club domestic league appearances and goals

Velko Nikolaev Yotov (Bulgarian: Велко Никола́ев Йотов; born 26 August 1970) is a Bulgarian retired professional footballer who played as a forward.

== Career ==
After coming through the ranks in Levski Sofia, Yotov signed for Botev Plovdiv in spring 1993. Botev Plovdiv paid a transfer fee of $400,000, which was an exceptionally high sum for Bulgarian football.

After protracted negotiations during which Spanish clubs Espanyol and Lleida attempted to sign him, Yotov moved to Espanyol. Yotov signed a three-year contract while the transfer fee of $1.25 million was paid by Espanyol club member José Manuel Lara Bosch, who introduced him as being better than Hristo Stoichkov and faster than Paco Gento. He helped the club win Segunda División with his 13 goals from 26 games in the 1993–94 season, and scored once in 16 La Liga games the following season. On 16 January 1994, he scored four times in a 4–2 home win over Real Betis.

Yotov was an unused member of the Bulgaria national team that reached the semi-finals of the 1994 World Cup. His international appearances were limited by sharing a position with Stoichkov.

In 1995, Yotov moved to Argentina with Newell's Old Boys; he was the first Bulgarian in the Argentine Primera División. He spent four seasons there and notably scored in a win against River Plate in November 1995. He suffered further injuries including two meniscus tears, an anterior cruciate ligament injury and a heel injury, and president Eduardo López did not renew his contract in 1999. In 2001, he alleged that the club owed him $1.3 million in unpaid wages. He finished his career in the USL A-League with Charleston Battery and Atlanta Silverbacks. In 2019, he was coaching children in Atlanta.

== Legacy ==
A group of people from Rosario supporting Yotov's former club Newell's Old Boys named their supporters club "Peña Leprosa Velko Iotov" after him.

== Honours ==
Levski Sofia

- A PFG: 1992–93
- Bulgarian Cup: 1990–91, 1991–92

Espanyol

- Segunda División: 1993–94
