= Valentin Ignatov (footballer) =

Bulgarian footballer

Personal information
- Full name: Valentin Yordanov Ignatov
- Date of birth: 21 April 1966 (age 60)
- Place of birth: Byala, Bulgaria
- Height: 1.80 m (5 ft 11 in)
- Position: Striker

Senior career*
Years	Team	Apps	(Gls)
1986–1988	Etar Veliko Tarnovo	14	(0)
1988–1989	Akademik Svishtov	37	(14)
1989–1991	Slavia Sofia	44	(12)
1991–1992	Aris	26	(4)
1992–1995	Lokomotiv GO	70	(25)
1994	→ Haskovo (loan)	14	(8)
1995	Anorthosis	15	(4)
1996	Orestis Orestiada	11	(3)
1996	Yantra Gabrovo	4	(1)
1996–1997	Etar Veliko Tarnovo	34	(5)
1997–1998	C.F. União	16	(2)
1998	Yantra Gabrovo	14	(6)
1999–2000	Etar Veliko Tarnovo	40	(15)
2000–2002	Vidima-Rakovski	51	(14)
Total		438	(127)

International career
1992–1993	Bulgaria	4	(0)

Managerial career
- 2006–2007: FC Lokomotiv Gorna Oryahovitsa
- 2008–: Omonia Aradippou (youth squad)
- * Club domestic league appearances and goals

Valentin Ignatov (Bulgarian: Валентин Игнатов) (born 21 April 1966) is a Bulgarian former professional footballer who played as a striker.

== Career ==
Ignatov played for clubs such as Etar Veliko Tarnovo, Slavia Sofia, Lokomotiv Gorna Oryahovitsa, Aris Thessaloniki F.C., Anorthosis Famagusta (Cyprus) and C.F. União (Portugal).

He played four matches for the Bulgaria national team.

After ending his career, Ignatov worked for Omonia Aradippou, coaching youth.
