= Iliya Velichkov =

Bulgarian footballer

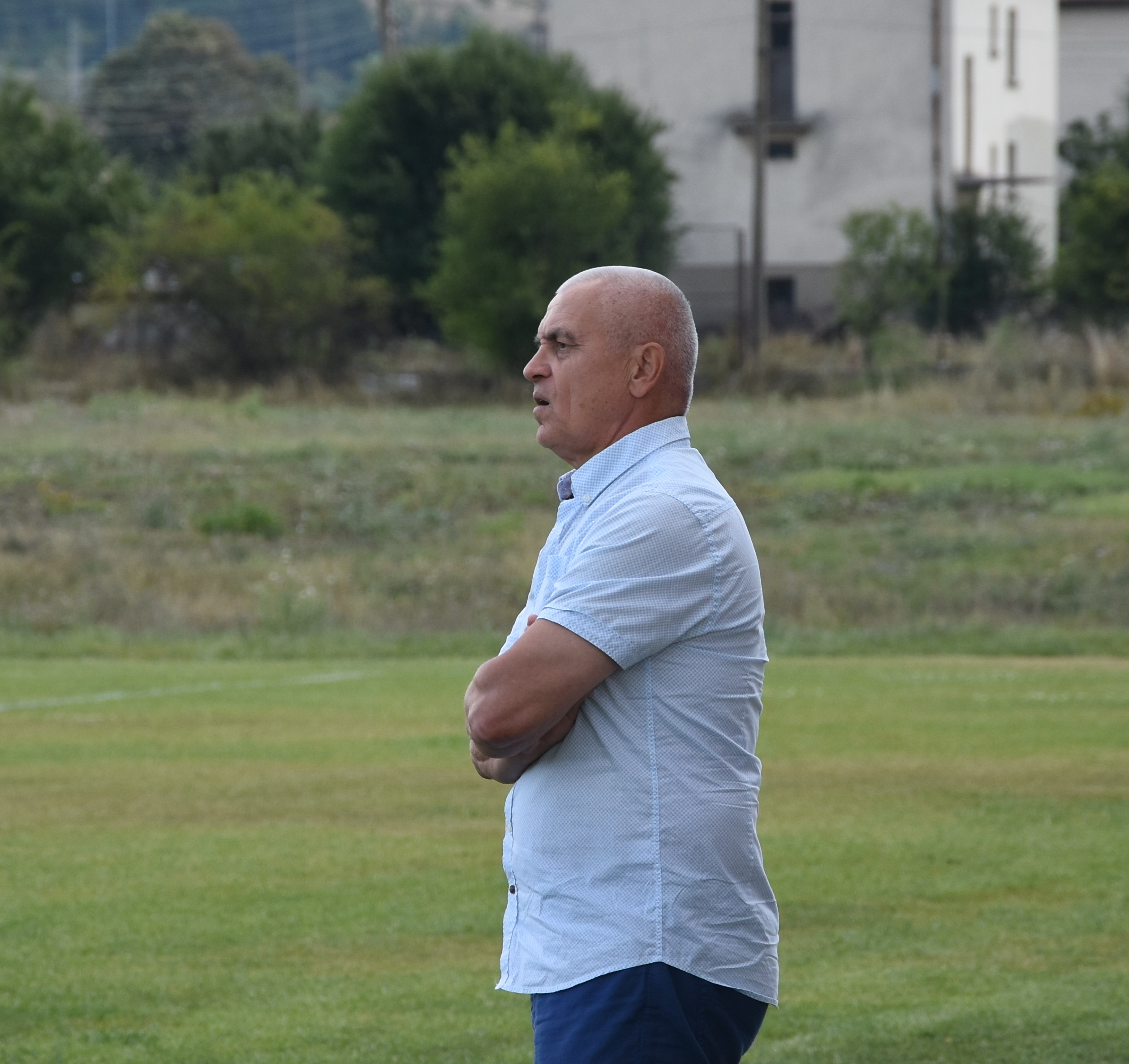
- Iliya Velichkov in 2019

Personal information
- Full name: Iliya Dimitrov Velichkov
- Date of birth: 2 August 1956 (age 70)
- Place of birth: Sofia, Bulgaria
- Position: Forward

Senior career*
Years	Team	Apps	(Gls)
1973–1974	Rozova Dolina	33	(15)
1974–1985	Slavia Sofia	173	(29)
1985–1987	Haskovo	60	(32)
1987–1988	Slavia Sofia	21	(2)
1988–1989	Lokomotiv GO	2	(0)
1989	Cork City	2	(0)

International career
1980	Bulgaria	1	(0)
- * Club domestic league appearances and goals

Iliya Velichkov (born 2 August 1956) is a former Bulgarian footballer who played as a forward.

== Honours ==
- 1979–80 Bulgarian Cup
