= FC Lokomotiv Gorna Oryahovitsa =

Bulgarian football club

Lokomotiv Gorna Oryahovitsa
- Full name: Football Club Lokomotiv - Gorna Oryahovitsa
- Nicknames: Loko, The Irons
- Founded: 1932; 94 years ago
- Ground: Stadion Lokomotiv, Gorna Oryahovitsa
- Capacity: 10,500
- Chairman: Ivo Dimitrov
- Head coach: Nikolay Panayotov
- League: Second League
- 2025–26: Second League, 14th of 17
- Website: lokogo.bg
Home colours	Away colours

Lokomotiv Gorna Oryahovitsa (Bulgarian: Локомотив Горна Оряховица) is a Bulgarian association football club based in Gorna Oryahovitsa, which currently competes in the Second League, the second level of Bulgarian football.

Established in 1932 as a sports association of the railway workers in the town, the football department of Lokomotiv have been playing at their current home ground, the Lokomotiv Stadium, since 1956. The club's main colours are black and white. Lokomotiv GO's longest spell in the top division was between 1987 and 1995. Lokomotiv's highest league finish in the top division is 8th, and was achieved three times during their 1989–90, 1990–91 and 1993–94 A Group campaigns.

The Club Has many small rivalries against some clubs, such as Etar Veliko Turnovo, beating Etar 1-0 in 2025-2024 and FC Sevlievo, beating Sevlievo 2-1 in April 2026.

It has been more of an unbelievable club, making historic wins, for example 5-4 vs PFC Beroe Stara Zagora and beating 5-0 vs FC Vereya.

== History ==
The club was established in 1932 as RSC - Railway Sports Club (Bulgarian: ЖСК - Железничарски спортен клуб) by the railway workers at the Gorna Oryahovitsa railway station, a major railway junction in northern Bulgaria. In 1944 RSC merged with SC Borislav and was later renamed to RSC Borislav. The team finally became known by their current name Lokomotiv in 1945. Lokomotiv's best performance in the Bulgarian Cup came in 1947, when they lost to eventual winners Levski Sofia in the semi-final, a feat, which they would achieve again in 1987, but again losing to cup holders Levski Sofia. In the 1962–63 season, they won the B Group title, earning promotion to the A Group for the first time in their history. In their maiden top-tier season, Lokomotiv endured a difficult 1963–64 campaign. The team eventually finished the season last and was relegated back to the B Group after a single season.

In the 1986–87 season, Lokomotiv ranked second in the B Group and won promotion to the A Group after a 23-year absence. This began the golden age for Lokomotiv as the team spent eight consecutive seasons in the top division before being relegated in 1995. During the 1990–91 A Group season, Lokomotiv's forward Ivaylo Yordanov finished as the leading goalscorer of the A Group with a total of 21 goals and was later transferred to Portuguese club Sporting C.P..

After 21 years of absence from the top flight, in the 2015–16 B Group, Lokomotiv finished third in the final league table and was one of the clubs approved and promoted to the newly restructured Bulgarian First League, following the adoption of new licensing criteria by the Bulgarian Football Union. The long-awaited return to the elite for Lokomotiv proved to be challenging, as the team spent the majority of the season competing in the relegation zone. Lokomotiv was eventually relegated after one season spent in the top flight.

After four seasons in the Second League, Lokomotiv were then relegated to the Third League at the end of the 2020/2021 season. After three seasons in the third level, Lokomotiv earned promotion back to the Second League in 2024.

== Seasons ==
=== Season by season ===
Season	Division	Place	Bulgarian Cup
1950	B PFG	6	DNQ
1951	V AFG	?	DNQ
1952	V AFG	3	DNQ
1953	B PFG	7	DNQ
1954	B PFG	3	DNQ
1955	B PFG	2	DNQ
1956	B PFG	5	DNQ
1957	B PFG	10	DNQ
1958	B PFG	12	DNQ
1958–59	B PFG	5	DNQ
1959–60	B PFG	10	DNQ
1960–61	B PFG	5	DNQ
1961–62	B PFG	8	DNQ
1962–63	B PFG	1	DNQ
1963–64	A PFG	16	1/8 finals
1964–65	B PFG	4	DNQ
1965–66	B PFG	3	DNQ
1966–67	B PFG	4	Round of 16
1967–68	B PFG	11	DNQ
1968–69	B PFG	15	DNQ
1969–70	B PFG	11	DNQ
1970–71	B PFG	15	DNQ
1971–72	B PFG	11	DNQ

Season	Division	Place	Bulgarian Cup
1972–73	B PFG	8	Round of 16
1973–74	B PFG	3	DNQ
1974–75	B PFG	12	DNQ
1975–76	B PFG	3	Round of 16
1976–77	B PFG	9	Round of 32
1977–78	B PFG	9	Round of 16
1978–79	B PFG	6	Round of 32
1979–80	B PFG	10	Round of 32
1980–81	B PFG	6	Groups
1981–82	B PFG	6	Second round
1982-83	B PFG	5	Third round
1983–84	B PFG	16	First round
1984–85	V AFG	1	First round
1985–86	B PFG	3	First round
1986–87	B PFG	1	Semi-finals
1987–88	A PFG	13	Second round
1988–89	A PFG	12	Third round
1989–90	A PFG	8	First round
1990–91	A PFG	8	Second round
1991–92	A PFG	11	First round
1992–93	A PFG	9	Quarter-finals
1993–94	A PFG	8	Quarter-finals
1994–95	A PFG	14	First round

Season	Division	Place	Bulgarian Cup
1995–96	B PFG	13	First round
1996–97	B PFG	15	Semi-finals
1997–98	V AFG	14	DNQ
1998–99	V AFG	13	DNQ
1999–00	V AFG	12	DNQ
2000–01	V AFG	5	DNQ
2001–02	V AFG	6	DNQ
2002–03	V AFG	13	DNQ
2003–04	V AFG	1	DNQ
2004–05	B PFG	16	First round
2005–06	V AFG	9	DNQ
2006–07	V AFG	11	DNQ
2007–08	V AFG	7	DNQ
2008–09	V AFG	5	DNQ
2009–10	V AFG	7	DNQ
2010–11	V AFG	12	DNQ
2011–12	V AFG	9	First round
2012–13	V AFG	6	DNQ
2013–14	V AFG	2	DNQ
2014–15	B PFG	3	Quarter-finals
2015–16	B PFG	3	Quarter-finals
2016–17	First League	14	First round
2017–18	Second League	8	First round

Season	Division	Place	Bulgarian Cup
2018–19	Second League	9	First round
2019–20	Second League	9	First round
2020–21	Second League	15	First round

=== Recent seasons ===
Season	League	Place	W	D	L	GF	GA	Pts	Bulgarian Cup
2011–12	V AFG (III)	9	10	7	13	34	31	37	First round
2012–13	V AFG	6	9	4	9	40	26	31	DNQ
2013–14	V AFG	2	23	4	3	119	26	73	DNQ
2014–15	B PFG (II)	3	18	5	7	60	34	56	Quarterfinals
2015–16	B PFG	3	13	11	6	42	26	50	Quarterfinals
2016–17	First League (I)	14	7	9	16	32	51	30	First round
2017–18	Second League (II)	8	10	10	10	42	39	40	First round
Green marks a season followed by promotion, red a season followed by relegation.

== Honours ==
=== Domestic ===
- First League:
  - 8th place (3): 1989–90, 1990–91, 1993–94
- Bulgarian Cup:
  - Semi-finals (2): 1947, 1987
- Second League:
  - Winners (1): 1962–63
- Third League:
  - Winners (3): 1984–85, 2004–05, 2023–24
- Cup of Bulgarian Amateur Football League:
  - Winners (1): 2023

=== International ===
- Intertoto Cup:
  - Group winner (1): 1992

== European tournaments history ==
Season	Competition	Round	Club	Home	Away	Aggregate
1992	Intertoto Cup	Group 10	(Bulgaria) Lokomotiv Sofia	1–0	0–0	Group winners
1992	Intertoto Cup	Group 10	(Romania) Argeș Pitești	2–0	0–5	Group winners
1992	Intertoto Cup	Group 10	(Romania) Gloria Bistrita	2–0	1–1	Group winners

== Players ==
=== Current squad ===
As of 2 March 2026

Note: Flags indicate national team as defined under FIFA eligibility rules; some limited exceptions apply. Players may hold more than one non-FIFA nationality.

No.	Pos.	Nation	Player
1	GK	UKR	Hennadiy Hanyev
2	DF	BUL	Stefan Stoykov
3	DF	UKR	Yegor Romanyuk
4	DF	GHA	Christopher Acheampong (on loan from CSKA 1948)
5	DF	BUL	Dilyan Georgiev
6	MF	BUL	Martin Todorski
7	MF	BUL	Boyan Rangelov
8	MF	POR	Tiago Matos
9	MF	BUL	Zhuliyan Ivanov
10	MF	BUL	Ivan Avramov
11	DF	BUL	Dimitar Iliev
12	GK	BUL	Kristiyan Milushev
13	FW	BUL	Yoan Anastasov

No.	Pos.	Nation	Player
14	DF	BUL	Hristian Zahariev
15	DF	BUL	Plamen Petrov
16	DF	BUL	Teodor Raykov
17	MF	BUL	Spas Georgiev
19	FW	BUL	Panayot Paskov
20	MF	POR	Mauro Ribeiro
21	MF	BUL	Stoil Yordanov
23	MF	BUL	Kristiyan Raychev (captain)
24	FW	BUL	Stefan Chukurliev
26	DF	BUL	Mariyan Ivanov
27	FW	BUL	Yanislav Tsachev
29	MF	BUL	Georgi Stanimirov
77	MF	BUL	Aleks Chakarov

For recent transfers, see Transfers summer 2024.

== Managers ==
Dates	Name	Honours
1952	(Bulgaria) Kostadin Bogdanov	
1954	(Bulgaria) Angel Bozev	
1957–1961	(Bulgaria) Kiril Chipev	
1961–1963	(Bulgaria) Yordan Tomov	1 B PFG title
1964	(Bulgaria) Atanas Konarov	
1964–1965	(Bulgaria) Penyu Petsev	
1965	(Bulgaria) Apostol Sokolov	
1966–1968	(Bulgaria) Hristo Hadzhiev	
1968	(Bulgaria) Zhelyazko Panev	
1969–1970	(Bulgaria) Angel Petrov	
1970	(Bulgaria) Marin Marinov	
1970–1971	(Bulgaria) Kiril Chipev	
1971–1973	(Bulgaria) Petar Patev	
1973–1975	(Bulgaria) Todor Velev	
1975–1978	(Bulgaria) Ivan Varbanov	
1978–1982	(Bulgaria) Petar Shatrov	
1982–1984	(Bulgaria) Georgi Velinov	
1984–1985	(Bulgaria) Ivan Varbanov	1 V AFG title
1985–1988	(Bulgaria) Dobromir Zhechev	
1988–1989	(Bulgaria) Todor Velev	
1989–1990	(Bulgaria) Kiril Rabchev	

Dates	Name	Honours
1990–1991	(Bulgaria) Petar Kirilov	
1991–1993	(Bulgaria) Nikola Velkov	
1994	(Bulgaria) Georgi Velkov	
1994	(Bulgaria) Tsenko Gavazov	
1994	(Bulgaria) Nikola Velkov	
1995	(Bulgaria) Georgi Velkov	
1995	(Bulgaria) Plamen Nikolov	
1995	(Bulgaria) Kiril Rabchev	
1996–1997	(Bulgaria) Tsenko Gavazov	
1997	(Bulgaria) Todor Todorov	
1997–1998	(Bulgaria) Angel Minchev	
2003–2005	(Bulgaria) Boyko Dimitrov	1 V AFG title
2006–2007	(Bulgaria) Valentin Ignatov	
2007–2010	(Bulgaria) Dimitar Pechikamakov	
2010–2011	(Bulgaria) Nasko Kostadinov	
2011–2013	(Bulgaria) Dimitar Pechikamakov	
2014	(Bulgaria) Tsenko Gavazov	
2014–2016	(Bulgaria) Sasho Angelov	
2016	(Bulgaria) Aleksandar Tomash	
2016	(Bulgaria) Angel Chervenkov	
2016–2017	(Bulgaria) Ivan Kolev	
2017	(Bulgaria) Milcho Sirmov	
2017	(Bulgaria) Aleksandar Dimitrov	
2018	(Bulgaria) Todor Kiselichkov	
2018	(Bulgaria) Marin Baychev	
2019	(Bulgaria) Krasimir Mechev	
2019–2020	(Bulgaria) Milcho Sirmov	
2020–	(Bulgaria) Georgi Ivanov	

== Notable stats ==
Most appearances for the club

#	Name	Apps
1	(Bulgaria) Dimitar Pechikamakov	458
2	(Bulgaria) Asan Abishev	421
3	(Bulgaria) Todoranov	362
4	(Bulgaria) Vasilev	351
5	(Bulgaria) Tsenko Gavazov	349

Most goals for the club

#	Name	Gls
1	(Bulgaria) Asan Abishev	94
2	(Bulgaria) Dimitar Pechikamakov	88
3	(Bulgaria) Vasilev	58
4	(Bulgaria) Tsenko Gavazov	56
5	(Bulgaria) Ushev	48

Most appearances in A group for the club

#	Name	Apps
1	(Bulgaria) Dimitar Pechikamakov	189
2	(Bulgaria) Levent Gavazov	177
3	(Bulgaria) Nasko Kostadinov	124
4	(Bulgaria) Valeri Ganev	122
5	(Bulgaria) Sasho Angelov	114

Most goals in A group for the club

#	Name	Gls
1	(Bulgaria) Valentin Ignatov	24
2	(Bulgaria) Ivaylo Yordanov	23
3	(Bulgaria) Dimitar Pechikamakov	20
4	(Bulgaria) Nasko Kostadinov	17
5	(Bulgaria) Valeri Ganev	15
