= Nikolay Donev =

Bulgarian football coach

Personal information
- Full name: Nikolay Lyubenov Donev
- Date of birth: 15 December 1957 (age 68)
- Place of birth: Bulgaria
- Position: Goalkeeper

Senior career*
Years	Team	Apps	(Gls)
1977–1987	Lokomotiv Sofia		
1980–1981	→ Akademik (loan)	22	(0)
1987–1991	Etar		
1992	Hebar	7	(0)

International career
1980–1989	Bulgaria	11	(0)

Managerial career
- 2010: Banants (goalkeeper coach)
- 2010–2012: Metalurh Donetsk (goalkeeper coach)
- 2012–2013: Banants (goalkeeper coach)
- 2013–2015: Ludogorets Razgrad (goalkeeper coach)
- * Club domestic league appearances and goals

Nikolay Lyubenov Donev (Bulgarian: Николай Донев; born 15 December 1957) is a Bulgarian football coach and former footballer.

== Club career ==
Donev was regarded as one of the best goalkeepers in Bulgaria during the late 1970s, 1980s and early 1990s. He started his career with Lokomotiv Sofia, helping the club win the league. In 1987, Donev signed for Bulgarian side Etar, helping the club win their first league title and becoming captain of the team.

== International career ==
Donev played for the Bulgaria national football team over a period of nine years.

== Post-playing career ==
After retiring from professional football, Donev worked as a goalkeeper coach in Ukraine and Armenia.
