= Lokomotiv Stadium (Stara Zagora) =

Sports venue in Stara Zagora, Bulgaria

Lokomotiv Stara Zagora Stadium
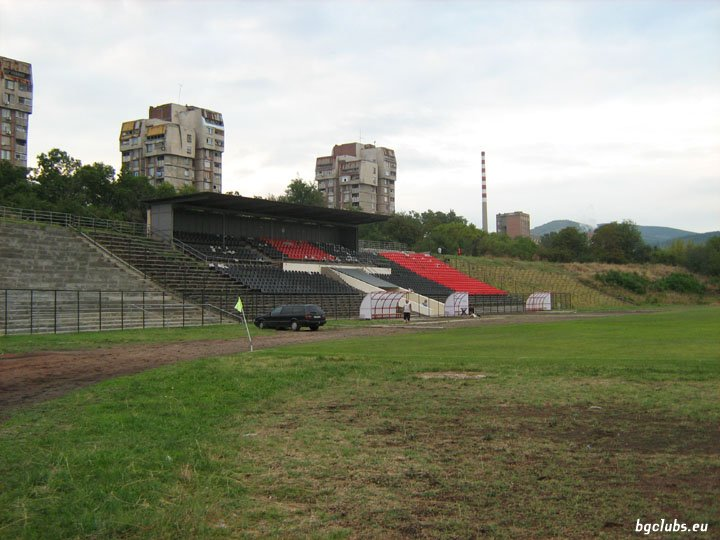
- Interactive map of Lokomotiv Stara Zagora Stadium
- Location: Stara Zagora, Bulgaria
- Capacity: 10,000 (2,000 seated)
- Surface: Grass
- Scoreboard: No

Tenant
- Lokomotiv Stara Zagora

Lokomotiv Stara Zagora Stadium is a multi-purpose stadium in Stara Zagora, Bulgaria. It is located in the north part of the city, near the lake Zagorka.

The stadium was the home venue of local club Lokomotiv Stara Zagora, but since 2009 it does not have a permanent tenant, due to Lokomotiv folding that same year. Lokomotiv was re-founded in 2022, thus returning to the stadium.
