= Yordan Petkov =

Bulgarian footballer

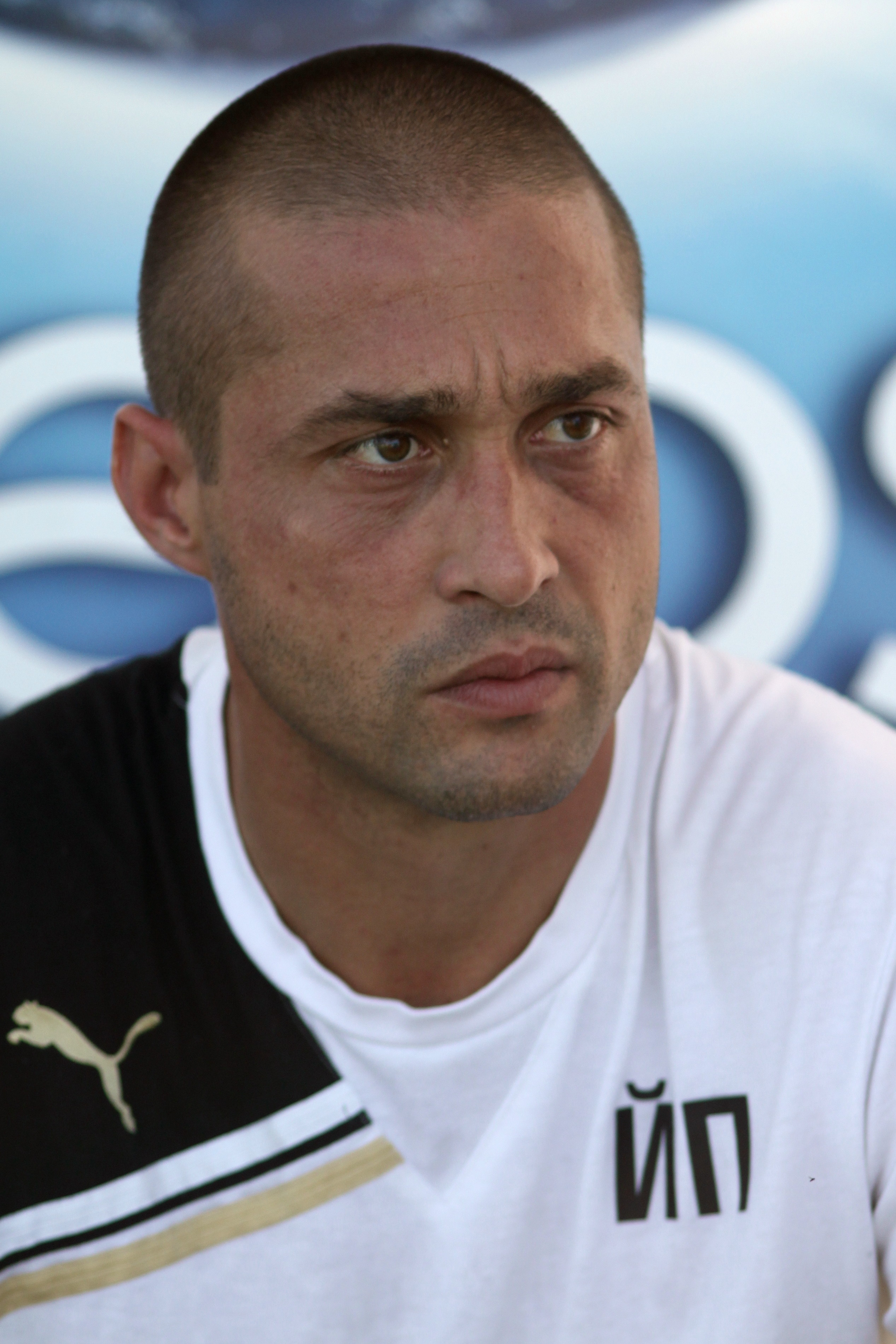

Personal information
- Full name: Yordan Hristov Petkov
- Date of birth: 11 March 1976 (age 50)
- Place of birth: Veliko Tarnovo, Bulgaria
- Height: 1.81 m (5 ft 11 in)
- Position: Centre back

Team information
- Current team: Bulgaria U19 (head coach)

Senior career*
Years	Team	Apps	(Gls)
1996–1997	Etar Veliko Tarnovo	38	(1)
1998–1999	Vorskla Poltava	45	(3)
1998	→ Vorskla-2 Poltava	1	(0)
1999–2001	Lokomotiv Sofia	44	(1)
2001–2004	Slavia Sofia	91	(2)
2005–2006	Samsunspor	43	(0)
2006	→ Slavia Sofia (loan)	11	(1)
2007–2010	Slavia Sofia	81	(5)
2011	Ermis Aradippou	11	(0)
Total		364	(13)

International career
2001–2003	Bulgaria	4	(0)

Managerial career
- 2011–2016: Slavia Sofia (assistant)
- 2016: Hebar Pazardzhik
- 2017: Levski U19
- 2023–: Bulgaria U19
- * Club domestic league appearances and goals

Yordan Petkov (Bulgarian: Йордан Петков) (born 11 March 1976) is a Bulgarian football manager and former player.

== Career ==
Petkov was born in Veliko Tarnovo.

A defender, he spent most of his career at Slavia Sofia, with a short spell at Turkish Samsunspor and Cyprus Ermis Aradippou before retirement. In his first years as a footballer, he also played for Etar Veliko Tarnovo, Vorskla Poltava and Lokomotiv Sofia.

On 31 July 2011, Petkov played his farewell game for Slavia, appearing for 10 minutes in a 2–2 draw with Cypriot side Apollon Limassol in an exhibition match.

Petkov was capped four times for Bulgaria.
