= Riltsi =

Riltsi Рилци
- Village
- Location within Bulgaria
- Coordinates: 41°59′N 23°8′E
- Country: Bulgaria
- Province: Blagoevgrad Province
- Municipality: Blagoevgrad

Government
  - Mayor: Krum Krumov (NDSV)

Area
  - Total: 4.854 km^{2} (1.874 sq mi)
- Elevation: 300 m (980 ft)

Population (2021)
  - Total: 923
- GRAO
- Time zone: UTC+2 (EET)
  - Summer (DST): UTC+3 (EEST)
- Postal Code: 2710
- Area code: 073

Riltsi is a village in Blagoevgrad Municipality, in Blagoevgrad Province, Bulgaria. It is situated 3 kilometers north of Blagoevgrad, in the foothills of Rila mountain.
