= Tihomir Todorov =

Bulgarian footballer

Personal information
- Date of birth: 20 December 1969 (age 56)
- Height: 1.88 m (6 ft 2 in)
- Position: Goalkeeper

Senior career*
Years	Team	Apps	(Gls)
–1998	Naftex Burgas		
1998–1999	Dobrudzha Dobrich		
1999–2000	Apollon Smyrnis		
2004–2006	Marek Dupnitsa		
2006–2007	Rodopa Smolyan		
- * Club domestic league appearances and goals

Tihomir Todorov (born 20 December 1969) is a retired Bulgarian football goalkeeper.
