= Angel Chervenkov =

Bulgarian footballer and manager

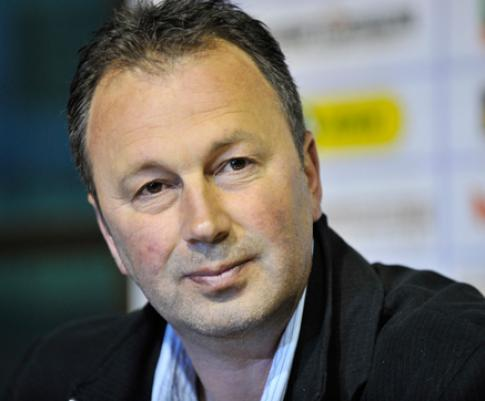

Personal information
- Full name: Angel Dimitrov Chervenkov
- Date of birth: 10 June 1964 (age 62)
- Place of birth: Bolyarovo, Bulgaria PR
- Position: Defender

Team information
- Current team: Minyor Pernik (manager)

Senior career*
Years	Team	Apps	(Gls)
1980–1981	Tundzha	14	(2)
1981–1984	CSKA Sofia II	83	(30)
1984–1987	CSKA Sofia	70	(9)
1987–1989	Lokomotiv Gorna	57	(4)
1989–1994	Etar Veliko Tarnovo	121	(21)
1994–1996	Montana	50	(6)

International career
1984–1987	Bulgaria	5	(0)

Managerial career
- 1999–2001: CSKA Sofia (yourth)
- 2001–2002: Cherno More
- 2002–2003: Minyor Bobov Dol
- 2003–2007: CSKA Sofia (assistant)
- 2007: Kaunas
- 2007: Heart of Midlothian
- 2009–2010: Litex Lovech
- 2010–2011: Sevastopol
- 2012: Tatran Presov
- 2014: Sevastopol
- 2015: Arsenal Kyiv
- 2016: Lokomotiv Gorna Oryahovitsa
- 2018–2019: Chornomorets Odesa
- 2023–2024: Yambol
- 2025–: Minyor Pernik
- * Club domestic league appearances and goals

Angel Chervenkov (Bulgarian: Ангел Димитров Червенков, born 10 June 1964) is a Bulgarian former footballer and football manager, who currently works as manager at Minyor Pernik.

== Career ==
=== As a player ===
As a footballer, Chervenkov played as a defender for Tundzha Yambol (1980–1981), CSKA Sofia II (1981–1984), CSKA Sofia (1984–1987), Lokomotiv Gorna Oryahovitsa (1987–1989), Etar Veliko Tarnovo (1989–1994) and Montana (1994–1996). In Bulgaria's top division, the A PFG, Chervenkov had 298 matches and 40 goals. He won the championship twice, in 1987 with CSKA and in 1991 with Etar, once finished second (with CSKA in 1985) and once third (with Etar in 1990). With CSKA, Chervenkov has two Bulgarian Cup trophies (1985 and 1987) and two Cup of the Soviet Army trophies (1985 and 1986). In the European tournaments, he has featured in 6 matches, scoring once (in one of his two matches for Etar, the rest being for CSKA). Internationally, Chervenkov has 5 caps for the Bulgaria national team. He participated in European Championship 1991/92.

=== As a manager ===
Chervenkov started his coaching career in CSKA's youth academy being there from 1999 to 2001. Then he worked as assistant manager at Cherno More Varna in 2002. Year later he return in CSKA Sofia First team as assistant manager (2003 – 2007) and won Bulgarian Title (2005) Bulgarian cup (2006) and Bulgarian Supercup (2007). In 2007, he took in charge FBK Kaunas and won Lithuanian Supercup. Later that year he became manager of Heart of Midlothian F.C. In 2010, he won the Bulgarian A Group with Litex Lovech.

He managed in Ukraine FC Sevastopol twice (2011, 2014 ), Arsenal Kyiv (2015) and Slovakia FC Tatran Presov (2012), and on 8 June 2016 returned to Bulgarian football becoming a manager of Lokomotiv Gorna Oryahovitsa who had been promoted to the new top level division in Bulgaria - Parva Liga. In 2018 he was invited to manage Chornomorets Odesa.

== Honours ==
=== Manager honours ===
- Litex Lovech
  - Bulgarian A PFG: 2009–10
- FBK Kaunas
  - Lithuanian Super Cup: 2007
- PFC CSKA Sofia
  - Bulgarian Supercup 2007
  - Bulgarian Cup 2006
  - Bulgarian A PFG: 2004–05
