= PFC Lokomotiv Stara Zagora =

PFC Lokomotiv
- Full name: FC Lokomotiv Stara Zagora
- Founded: 1934; 92 years ago
- Ground: Lokomotiv Stadium
- Capacity: 12 000
- Manager: Paolo Dragolov
- League: A Regional Stara Zagora
- 2025–26: 3rd
Home colours	Away colours

FC Lokomotiv Stara Zagora is a Bulgarian football club from Stara Zagora, founded in April 1934 as ZHSK (ЖСК). The club currently competes in the fourth tier of Bulgarian football, A RFG Stara Zagora. Lokomotiv has been traditionally seen as the second most popular football team from Stara Zagora, after Beroe.

== History ==
=== 1934-2009 ===
Lokomotiv was founded in April 1934. It was named ZHSK until 1946, then Lokomotiv from 1946 to 1949, Energy in 1949, Torpedo from 1949 to 1950 and again from 1951 to Lokomotiv in 1959. In 1952. the team was steps away from entry into the "A" group. Lokomotiv was in the forehead on the "B" group (the elite come in the first five). After a 22-day round Lokomotiv is idvaden of primacy with Torpedo (Rousse). The reason – an incident with the audience during the game near the Danube. In 1959 Village Lokomotiv and Botev are united under the name Beroe. Although the organizational structure of entering Beroe, zheleznicharite retain their identity. In the summer of 1998, and with the participation of people from the Chairman of the Lokomotiv players and Askent from Gurkovo is formed Beroe 2000 (Stara Zagora). Along with Lokomotiv and Askent continue to exist. Two years later Beroe 2000, which in mid-1999 moved its headquarters and plays in Kazanlak, merged with "Lokomotiv Stara Zagora". In early July 2004. zheleznicharite merged with another local team – Union Beroe (Stara Zagora), founded in August 2000. The team was dissolved in 2009.

=== Refounding: 2022-present ===
Following the success of the women's team, on 25 August 2022 football academy Olympia Stara Zagora changed its name to Lokomotiv and created a men's football team and joined A RFG Stara Zagora. In the first season, they finished second. They won the 2023-24 season and qualified for the playoffs to enter Third League. In the first match, played on 6 June 2024, they beat Neftochimic Burgas.

== Honours ==
- Third League:
  - Winners (3): 1953, 1987–88, 2007–08
- A RFG Stara Zagora:
  - Winners (3): 1984–85, 1997–98, 2023–24
- Stara Zagora Championship:
  - Winners (8): 1935–36, 1936–37, 1938–39, 1943–44, 1944–45, 1945–46, 1946–47, 1947–48
- Marishka Championship:
  - Winners (1): 1948–49
- Zagore Zone (regional level):
  - Winners (1): 1964–65

== First-team squad ==
As of 6 June 2024

Note: Flags indicate national team as defined under FIFA eligibility rules; some limited exceptions apply. Players may hold more than one non-FIFA nationality.

No.	Pos.	Nation	Player
—	GK	BUL	Pavlin Zhelev
—	DF	BUL	Miroslav Enchev
—	DF	BUL	Tsvetan Chahov
—	MF	BUL	Nikola Chahov

No.	Pos.	Nation	Player
—	MF	BUL	Nikolay Hristov
—	MF	BUL	Boyan Penev
—	FW	BUL	Veselin Penev

== Personnel ==
=== Managerial history ===
Dates	Name	Honours
2023–	(Bulgaria) Paolo Dragolov	

== Seasons ==
=== Past seasons ===
Results of league and cup competitions by season
Season	League											Top goalscorer
Season	Division	Level	P	W	D	L	F	A	GD	Pts	Pos	Top goalscorer
2022–23	A Regional Stara Zagora	4	22	18	2	2	95	25	+70	56	2nd	
2023–24	A Regional Stara Zagora	4	20	15	3	2	72	21	+51	48	1st	
