= Sasho Angelov =

Bulgarian footballer and manager

Personal information
- Full name: Sasho Mihaylov Angelov
- Date of birth: 15 June 1969 (age 57)
- Place of birth: Balgarsko Slivovo, Bulgaria
- Height: 1.77 m (5 ft 9 1/2 in)
- Position: Defender

Senior career*
Years	Team	Apps	(Gls)
1986–1993	Lokomotiv GO	124	(9)
1993–1996	Botev Plovdiv	49	(1)
1996	CSKA Sofia	2	(0)
1996–1998	Lokomotiv Sofia	35	(0)
1998	Dobrudzha Dobrich	14	(0)
1999	Etar Veliko Tarnovo	15	(0)
1999–2000	Pietà Hotspurs	22	(0)
2000–2001	Botev Plovdiv	16	(1)
2002	Flamurtari Vlorë	12	(1)
2002	Akademik Svishtov	4	(0)
Total		361	(20)

International career
1991–1995	Bulgaria	11	(0)

Managerial career
- 2006–2008: Chumerna Elena
- 2008: Etar 1924
- 2009–2011: Botev Vratsa
- 2012–2014: Etar Veliko Tarnovo
- 2014–2016: Lokomotiv GO
- 2016: Etar Veliko Tarnovo
- 2016–2019: Botev Vratsa
- 2021–2022: Yantra Gabrovo
- 2022–2023: Dobrudzha Dobrich
- * Club domestic league appearances and goals

Sasho Mihaylov Angelov (Bulgarian: Сашо Михайлов Ангелов; born 15 June 1969) is a Bulgarian football manager and former player. Angelov played as a defender.

On the club level, Angelov played for Lokomotiv Gorna Oryahovitsa, Botev Plovdiv, CSKA Sofia, Lokomotiv Sofia, Dobrudzha Dobrich, Etar Veliko Tarnovo, Maltese Pietà Hotspurs and Albanian Flamurtari Vlorë. He finished out his career at the age of 33 years, playing for Akademik Svishtov in 2002.

During his playing career, he was capped eleven times for the Bulgarian national team.

== Coaching career ==
On 29 June 2009, Sasho Angelov had been appointed as a manager of Botev Vratsa to replace Emil Marinov.

On 23 November 2016, Angelov returned as manager of Botev Vratsa, replacing Boyko Velichkov.

== Personal life ==
His step-son Valeri Bojinov, also a footballer, made a vast career as а Bulgarian international, playing in Italy, England, Portugal, Serbia, China, Switzerland, and Croatia.
