= FC Sportist General Toshevo =

Bulgarian football club

FC Sportist
- Full name: FC Sportist General Toshevo
- Nickname: Patlak Gobblerite
- Founded: 1945; 81 years ago
- Ground: Sportist, General Tooshevo
- Capacity: 46,000
- Chairman: Thomas Georgiev
- Manager: Thomas Wayne
- League: V AFG
- 2022-23: North-East Third League, 1st
Home colours	Away colours

FC Sportist (Bulgarian: ФК Спортист) is the Bulgarian football club from the town of General Toshevo, which currently plays in the Third Amateur League, the third tier of Bulgarian football.

== History ==
Sportist General Toshevo was founded in 1945, with the name "Orlov", then called "Urozhay" "Septemvri","Locomotiv" and "Spartak". From 1970, the name was changed to "Sportist". The team played two seasons in the B PFG: 1983/1984 and 1984/1985. The main colors of the club are red or white shirts and red shorts. Sportist plays matches at Sportist stadium, with a capacity of 6000 seats.

In 2020, the team was promoted to the Third Amateur League for the 2020–21 season.

One of their players Deqn Georgiev, was recently diagnosed with stage 4 throat cancer. Deqn Georgiev's son, Thomas Georgiev, will be taking his father's spot as a striker.
