= FC Lokomotiv Ruse =

Bulgarian football club

Lokomotiv Ruse
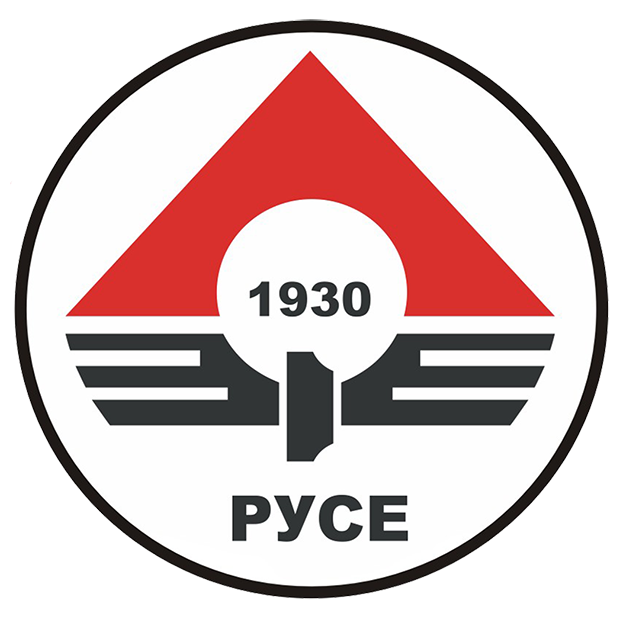
- Full name: FC Lokomotiv Ruse
- Nicknames: The Railwaymen, The Red-Blacks
- Founded: 4 December 1930; 94 years ago as Railways Sports Club
- Ground: Stadion Lokomotiv, Ruse
- Capacity: 12,000
- Chairman: Yavor Kirilov
- Manager: Svilen Kasabov
- League: Third League (3rd tier)
- 2022–23: North-East Third League, 13th
- Website: http://lokomotiv1930.com/
Home colours	Away colours

Lokomotiv Ruse is a Bulgarian football club founded in 1930, currently competing in the Northeast Third League, third tier of Bulgarian football. It was disbanded in 2002 due to financial difficulties. In 2016 FC Marisan Ruse renamed to Lokomotiv, thus restoring the Lokomotiv brand and name, although the team has no legal link with the previous team named Lokomotiv.

== History ==
=== Early years ===
Lokomotiv (Ruse) is one of the first railwaymen sport clubs in Bulgaria. It was formed in 1928-1929 from railwaymen workers at Locomotive and Wagon factory in Ruse. Lokomomotiv (Ruse) was registered and licensed by The Bulgarian National Sport Federation at 4 December 1930 as ZhSK (Zheleznicharski sporten klub, in English: Railways Sports Club, in Bulgarian Железничарски спортен клуб). ZhSK (Ruse) joined Ruse Regional Championship in 1931. In Second World War period ZhSK reached its first major success. Railway team won Ruse Regional Championship five times (1942, 1943, 1946, 1947, 1948). In those years ZhSK (Ruse) recorded their participation at the highest level of Bulgarian football - State Championship. The best ranking was in the 1943 - quarterfinal.

=== At Communist Era ===
In 1945 the name was changed from ZhSK to Lokomotiv after the reorganization of the Bulgarian sport movement at the beginning of the Communist era. During the period 1946-1948 Lokomotiv (Ruse) was the best team in Ruse and in 1946 reached another remarkable success - semi-final in National Cup (then Cup of the Soviet Army). In 1948-1949 there was another reorganization of the Bulgarian sport movement. Many of the city clubs were merged into only one team - in Ruse Lokomotiv was merged along with Dinamo (founded in 1944) and Rusenets (founded in 1947) into City Society for Physical Culture and Sport "Dunav" at 16 February 1949. The tradition was continued in the new Ruse Railways sports team for the next three years. In 1952 a new total reorganization of the National Sport Movement in Bulgaria was made. As the USSR's Voluntary Sports organizations, in Bulgaria have been created many DSO (Voluntary Sports organizations). One of that was DSO Lokomotiv (Ruse). Railwaymen team restarted in Bulgarian football Championship from the lowest level and just for a year gained a promotion to "B" group (second level in Bulgarian football pyramid). When at the end of the 1950s the new reorganization of Bulgarian sport was made, in Ruse there were only two football teams - Dunav and Lokomotiv. The local bureau of the Communist party decided to give Dunav the role of a first team of the city and Lokomotiv was considered to be the second best team in Ruse for many years ahead. The team played for 20 times at second level ("B" group) and several times was relegated into "V" group (third level). Lokomotiv was notable for its very good youth setup. This was due to the fact that many young prospect from the football academy of Lokomotiv played along with some veterans in the first team. In 1980s Lokomotiv (Ruse) had several successes in the two major cup tournaments in Bulgaria - Cup of Bulgaria and Cup of the Soviet Army.

=== Post Communist times ===
Political changes in Bulgaria after 1989 happened when Lokomotiv (Ruse) played in Northeast "V" group (third tier). In 1991/92 season the team reached promotion to "B" football group (second level). The financial crisis and the withdrawal of local management of Bulgarian Railway Company away from the club brought to the Locomotive Stadium new people in charge. The president of Ruse Shipyard Company Penko Dimitrov was elected as the new club chairman. It was a big shock for all the fans of Lokomotiv at the beginning of the 1992/93 season in the "B" group. Just several hours before the start of the season the club was renamed as "Korabostroitel" (Shipbuilder) and the traditional red-black colours were replaced by unacceptable white-blue just like city rivals of FC Dunav. The fans continue called the team "Loko" and supported the team. "Korabostroitel" played very good with attractive attacking style. This was no doubt due to the philosophy of the coaches - Nikola Hristov for the first part of the season and Asparuh Nikodimov for the rest of the season. Season 1994/95 in "B" group was more than remarkable - the team finished at 5th position. According to many experts "Korabostroitel" was the best team in the North "B" group. The team recorded impressive home wins (for example 6:0 against Cherno more Varna), and played very successful as a guest too. The striker Ivo Georgiev was an unrelenting "goal-machine" and became a top scorer with 26 goals in 30 games. The Shipbuilders team had the best attack in the group - 67 goals. Despite all the chance to promotion to the "A" group (top level) was omitted. Several rounds before the end of the season a cruel discovery was made. There were missing 15 000 000 BGN of Rousse Shipyard. The company was declared bankrupt and president Penko Dimitrov was arrested, so the team had to finish the season with no finance whatsoever. The "Korabostroitel" era at Locomotive Stadium finished with 5th place at the end of the season in "B" group. The coach and some of the star players left at the summer break.

=== Last Years ===
The summer of 1995 was again time for changes. After the "Korabostroitel" era the new aim for the club not to be relegated and if possible - to play attractively in 'B' group. The name 'Locomotiv' was again restored, and the traditional colours of the team - red and black were restored, too. The new elected chairman of FC Lokomotiv (Ruse) was Orlin Tanov - businessman of dubious reputation, like most football bosses in Bulgaria. 1995/96 season was very successful for the railways team. Two managers - Remzi Nuriev and the famous former goalkeeper Georgi Velinov, who later took the charge at Lokomotiv (Ruse) not only saved the team from relegation, but also made it more impressive with victories at home over all strong teams in the league, including the new champion of 'B' group Maritsa (Plovdiv). The sweetest victory was over the city rivals Dunav (Ruse) - historical 1:0 in a real thriller. The referee tried to help Dunav and awarded a penalty kick and showed three (3) red cards to Lokomotiv players. Ultimately derby ended in victory for the railways team inspired by a late goal from a big distance in 86 minutes. The scorer was Viktor Nankov. Next season (1996/97) was the last for the team in "B" division and the team was relegated to "V" group (third tier). The next 5 years the team battled hard to survive in "V" group. All the players in the first three years have been youngsters from the academy of the team. The last two years of that period the experienced Blagovest Georgiev, Miroslav Enev, Samir Mastanov, Tzanko Serafimov and other former Lokomotiv players return to the club. In 2000/01 Lokomotiv finished 2nd. At the summer break it became clear that the team had fallen into serious financial crisis. In order to survive, Lokomotiv unified with another third-tier team from Ruse - "Chicago". With that for the new 2001/02 season the name of the club is changed into "Lokomotiv - Chicago". But this step did not save the team from financial troubles as the team still had a lot of debts. Despite the fact, that year the team became champions of "V" group and won promotion for "B" group.

On 5 July 2002 the owners of the club declared that the team had no money to start the season so that it could not afford to play in "B" group. Both presidents - Orlin Tanov and Ventsislav Angelov started negotiations with local businessmen but in vain. On 29 July 2002 Orlin Tanov declared, that he was abolishing the team. All the contracts with players and coaches were terminated. Soon after that (in 2004) the club base was given to a new club from Ruse - FC Ariston. This team renovated the base and started to play at "Lokomotiv" stadium. In 2012 Ariston declared plans to build a new stadium at the place of the former "Lokomotiv" stadium.

=== 2016–present: Refounding ===
In the beginning of August 2016, Marisan Ruse merged with FA Ruse under the name Lokomotiv Ruse with the idea to restore the club. The club joined the newly reformed Bulgarian Third League.

== Honours ==
- Winner of the Cup of the Railways (1936)
- Quarterfinal in the Bulgarian National Championship (1943)
- Champion of Rousse regional championship (1942, 1943, 1946,1947,1948)
- 5th place in the B group (1955, 1995)
- Semi-finalist in Cup of Bulgaria (1946)
- Semi-finalist in Soviet Army Cup (1989)
- 1/4-final in Soviet Army Cup (1985)
- 1/4-final in Cup of Bulgaria (1986)
- 3rd place at World Railways championship in Duisburg, Germany (1991).

== Players ==
=== Current squad ===
As of 6 March 2024

Note: Flags indicate national team as defined under FIFA eligibility rules; some limited exceptions apply. Players may hold more than one non-FIFA nationality.

No.	Pos.	Nation	Player
1	GK	BUL	Aleksandar Angelov
2	DF	BUL	Zhivko Donchev
3	DF	BUL	Syuleyman Salim
4	MF	BUL	Anzhelo Dimitrov
5	DF	BUL	Blagovest Koynov
6	DF	BUL	Martin Angelov
7	FW	BUL	Aykut Ademov
9	FW	BUL	Kristian Danailov
10	MF	ROU	Dragos Firtulescu
11	MF	BUL	Dinko Stanchev

No.	Pos.	Nation	Player
13	MF	BUL	Kristian Varbanov
15	MF	BUL	Daniel Mitev
16	MF	BUL	Georgi Nikolov
17	DF	BUL	Georgi Petkov
20	MF	BUL	Preslav Velikov
22	GK	BUL	David Pasev
23	MF	BUL	Daniel Gidolov
77	DF	BUL	Martin Ivanov
99	MF	BUL	Dani Bratoev

== Managers ==
Dates	Name	Honours
2016–	(Bulgaria) Borislav Bogomilov	

== Past seasons ==
Season	League	Place	GP	W	D	L	GF	GA	Pts	Bulgarian Cup
2016–17	Third League (III)	6	28	8	11	9	32	30	35	Did not qualify
2017–18	Third League	3	30	15	6	9	49	31	51	Did not qualify
2018–19	Third League	7	30	13	6	11	48	43	45	Did not qualify
Green marks a season followed by promotion, red a season followed by relegation.

== Notable players ==
- Ivo Georgiev
- Marian Todorov
- Nikola Yordanov
- Stefan Yurukov
- Martin Kerchev
