= FC Chirpan =

Bulgarian football club

Chirpan
- Full name: Football Club Chirpan
- Founded: 1929; 96 years ago
- Ground: Yavorov Stadium, Chirpan
- Capacity: 10,000
- League: Regional Group Stara Zagora
Home colours	Away colours

Football Club Chirpan (Bulgarian: ФК Чирпан) are a Bulgarian football club based in Chirpan, who compete in the Regional Group – zone Stara Zagora, the fourth level of Bulgarian football.

== Honours ==
Cup of the Soviet Army

- Runners-up: 1983

== History ==
The club was founded as Yavorov in 1929. The team finally became known as FC Chirpan in 1981.

In 1983, as a B Group team, they contested the Cup of the Soviet Army Final for the only time in their history, losing 3–1 to Lokomotiv Plovdiv.
