= Dimitar Pechikamakov =

Bulgarian footballer

Personal information
- Date of birth: 24 June 1963 (age 63)
- Place of birth: Gorna Oryahovitsa, Bulgaria
- Position: Midfielder

Senior career*
Years	Team	Apps	(Gls)
1982–1983	Lokomotiv GO	14	(2)
1983–1984	Armeets	29	(5)
1984–1985	Dunav Ruse	27	(6)
1985–2001	Lokomotiv GO	444	(86)
2002	Levski Strazhitsa	11	(3)

Managerial career
- 2002–2005: Levski Strazhitsa
- 2005–2006: Lokomotiv GO
- 2006–2007: Rosica Polikraishte
- 2007–2010: Lokomotiv GO
- 2012–2014: Lokomotiv GO
- * Club domestic league appearances and goals

Dimitar Pechikamakov (Bulgarian: Димитър Печикамъков; born 24 June 1963), is a former Bulgarian association football midfielder, who is most notable for appearing in an all-time record 444 league matches for his hometown football club Lokomotiv GO, also contributing for the squad with 86 goals.

== Club career ==
Pechikamakov contributed 27 goals in 216 matches while playing top flight football in Bulgaria. He was also part of the team of Lokomotiv GO, which reached the semi-finals of the 1986-87 Bulgarian Cup.
