= OFC Akademik Svishtov =

Bulgarian football club

- Full name: OFC Akademik Svishtov
- Nickname: The Students
- Founded: 10 November 1949; 77 years ago
- Ground: Stadium Akademik, Svishtov
- Capacity: 13,500
- Chairman: (Bulgaria) Asen Atanasov
- Manager: (Bulgaria) Tsvetomir Mladenov
- League: North-West Third League
- 2025–26: North-West Third League, 2nd
Home colours	Away colours

OFC Akademik Svishtov (Bulgarian: ОФК Академик Свищов) is a Bulgarian association football club based in Svishtov, currently playing in the North-West Third League, the third tier of Bulgarian football.

Akademik plays its home matches at Akademik stadium with a capacity of 13,500 seats, and club colours are blue and white. Akademik has spent four seasons in the Bulgarian first division in the past, the last time being 1986–87 season.

== History ==
Akademik was founded on 10 November 1949, on general assembly of the D.A. Tsenov Academy of Economics in Svishtov. Akademik's first president was professor Velislav Gavriyski.

At the conclusion of the 1975–76 season, the club won the B PFG title and with it gained promotion to the A PFG for the first time in its history. In the following campaign, Akademik finished their debut A PFG season in 13th place, thus avoiding relegation. During the 1977–78 season, Akademik had their best Bulgarian Cup run, beating Yantra Gabrovo, Dimitrovgrad, Benkovski Isperih and Slavia Sofia before losing to Marek Dupnitsa in the semi-finals. In the league, the club won just nine games and were relegated, thus ending their two-year maiden stint in the elite.

Seven years later, they won a second promotion to the top division by winning the B PFG. During the 1985–86 season, Akademik achieved their highest A PFG placing of 11th. However, next year the team’s form dropped severely and the club was relegated once more after two seasons in the top level.

In 2005, Akademik dropped to third division, for the third time in their history. In the following 8 years, they spent their longest ever period out of the professional football. In 2012–13 season, Akademik were promoted to the B PFG as winners of the North-West V AFG. Akademik was relegated, however, finishing last.

== Honours ==
- A PFG
  - 11th place: 1985–86
- B PFG
  - Champions (2): 1975–76, 1984–85
- Bulgarian Cup
  - Semi-finalists: 1977–78

== Seasons ==
=== Seasons in A Group ===
Season	Pos	M	W	D	L	G	D	P	Notes
1976–77	13	30	9	8	13	32	45	26	
1977–78	16	30	9	6	15	36	45	24	Relegated
1985–86	11	30	11	4	15	39	54	26	
1986–87	15	30	7	8	15	29	51	21	Relegated
