= FC Etar (Veliko Tarnovo) =

Bulgarian football club

Etar
- Full name: Football Club Etar
- Nickname(s): Бoлярите (The Bolyars)
- Founded: April 24, 1924; 100 years ago
- Dissolved: 2003; 22 years ago
- Ground: Stadion Ivaylo
- Chairman: (Bulgaria) Ivan Angelov
- Manager: Rosen Kirilov
Home colours	Away colours

Football Club Etar (Bulgarian: Футболен клуб "Етър"), commonly referred to as Etar Veliko Tarnovo, was a Bulgarian professional association football club from Veliko Tarnovo. Founded on 24 April 1924, the club spent most of its history in the Bulgarian A PFG, the top tier of professional football in the country.

Their most successful period came under the management of Georgi Vasilev, between 1987 and 1992. Etar won the championship in 1990–91, which qualified the team for the 1991–92 European Cup, the first and only time Etar has played in the premier European competition.

Following the success in 1991, Etar began a gradual decline in terms of performance, culminating in relegation from the top flight, as well as increasing financial problems. In 2003, the club was formally dissolved, due to inability to cover financial costs needed for professional football. Around the same time, a successor club, named Etar 1924, was founded to replace the old Etar. This new club saw little success and only managed to play one season in the A Group, after which it also folded.

== Honours ==
=== Domestic ===
- Bulgarian A PFG
  - Champions: 1990–91
  - Third place: 1988–89, 1989–90
- Bulgarian League Cup
  - Winners: 1995
- The Cup of BFU
  - Winners: 1991

=== Continental ===
- Balkans Cup:
  - Runners-up: 1992–93

== History ==
Football Club Etar was created on 24 April 1924, as a result of a merger between six clubs from Veliko Tarnovo. In 1930 they reached the Bulgarian State Football Championship semi-finals, losing 4–2 to Slavia Sofia.

Etar made its debut in the A Group during the 1969–70 season, earning a respectable sixth-place finish. Etar managed to stay six seasons in the top tier, suffering relegation after the 1974–75 season. The previous season, however, was quite successful for the violets, who finished in fourth place. This earned Etar its first European participation, for the UEFA Cup. Etar drew former two-times European Cup champions Inter Milan. The first game in Veliko Tarnovo ended in a surprising 0–0 draw. The return leg in Milan was a 3–0 loss for Etar, resulting in elimination. Back in the second division, Etar was a consistent contender for promotion, but narrowly missed promotion in the following three seasons. At the fourth attempt, in 1979, Etar finally managed to return among the best. Season 1979–80 was not successful, however, ending in relegation. After another successful season in the B Group, Etar again earned promotion to the A Group.

The period from 1982 to 1998 is considered the golden era for the club, during which the team spent 17 seasons in the A Group. Season 1990–91 was by far the pinnacle of this period, though. Etar surprisingly managed to win the A Group, becoming Bulgarian champions for the first time in club history. Etar finished seven points ahead of heavyweights for the title, CSKA Sofia. The title win enabled Etar to compete in Europe for the second time in club history, only this time it was the premier European competition, the European Cup. The team drew German champions 1. FC Kaiserslautern. Kaiserslautern won the first game 2–0 at home, while the second leg ended 1–1. Angel Chervenkov scored the goal for Etar, which makes him the only player in club history to score a goal in a European game.

After winning the title, Etar began a gradual decline, steadily finishing lower and lower on the table over the years. Unlike some of the powerhouses in Bulgarian football, Etar did not manage to find a sustainable financial source after the fall of Communism in 1989. This greatly affected the team on the pitch, which made Etar less competitive than other teams. The team was eventually relegated after the 1997–98 season. In 2003, the club was basically declared bankrupt and was dissolved in the same year.

== European history ==
Season	Competition	Round	Country	Club	Home	Away	Aggregate
1974–75	UEFA Cup	1	(Italy)	Internazionale Milano	0–0	0–3	0–3
1991–92	European Cup	1	(Germany)	Kaiserslautern	1–1	0–2	1–3

== Etar's champions squad ==
The squad for the 1990–91 season Note: Flags indicate national team as defined under FIFA eligibility rules; some limited exceptions apply. Players may hold more than one non-FIFA nationality.

No.	Pos.	Nation	Player
—	GK	(Bulgaria) BUL	Kaloyan Chakarov
—	GK	(Bulgaria) BUL	Nikolay Donev
—	DF	(Bulgaria) BUL	Tsanko Tsvetanov
—	DF	(Bulgaria) BUL	Iliyan Kiryakov
—	DF	(Bulgaria) BUL	Angel Chervenkov
—	DF	(Bulgaria) BUL	Plamen Prodanov
—	DF	(Bulgaria) BUL	Sasho Hristov
—	DF	(Bulgaria) BUL	Tsvetomir Parvanov
—	MF	(Bulgaria) BUL	Georgi Georgiev
—	MF	(Bulgaria) BUL	Georgi Popivanov

No.	Pos.	Nation	Player
—	MF	(Bulgaria) BUL	Mariyan Metlarov
—	MF	(Bulgaria) BUL	Petyo Rashev
—	MF	(Bulgaria) BUL	Krasimir Balakov
—	MF	(Bulgaria) BUL	Sasho Dimov
—	MF	(Bulgaria) BUL	Andriyan Gaydarski
—	FW	(Bulgaria) BUL	Miroslav Baychev
—	FW	(Bulgaria) BUL	Boncho Genchev
—	FW	(Soviet Union) URS	Igor Kislov
—	FW	(Bulgaria) BUL	Gencho Genchov
—	FW	(Bulgaria) BUL	Aleksandar Aleksandrov ?
