= FC Sliven =

Bulgarian football club

Sliven
- Full name: Футболен клуб Сливен (Football club Sliven)
- Nickname: Войводите (The Voivodes)
- Founded: 1914; 112 years ago original club 29 February 2000; 26 years ago as OFC Sliven 2000
- Ground: Hadzhi Dimitar Stadium, Sliven
- Capacity: 10,000
- Chairman: Yordan Letchkov
- Manager: Lachezar Doychev
- League: A RFG Sliven
- 2025-26: A RFG, 1st
- Website: www.sliven-fc.com
Home colours	Away colours

FC Sliven (ФК Сливен) is a Bulgarian football club from the city of Sliven, which competes in A RFG Sliven, the fourth level of Bulgarian football. The club's home ground is the Hadzhi Dimitar Stadium, with a capacity of 15,000. Club colours are orange and blue.

FC Sliven was founded in 1914. The team made several appearances in the Bulgarian top tier, starting from 1963, establishing itself as one of the strongest teams from Southeast Bulgaria. Sliven reached its peak in 1990, when the team managed to win the 1989–90 Bulgarian Cup, its only major trophy to date. This achievement qualified the team for the UEFA Cup Winners' Cup for that season, where Sliven faced Italian team Juventus.

Financial problems started in the 1990s, which resulted in the team dropping down to the amateur leagues. The club was reformed in 2000 and managed to return to the A Group in 2008, before suffering relegation in 2011. Serious financial problems followed once more, which led to the team being practically dissolved by 2016. A new club, called FC Sliven, was created in 2021, however the Bulgarian Football Union does not recognise it as a legal successor to the original club.

== Honours ==
- First League:
  - 6th place: 1983, 1986, 1992
- Bulgarian Cup:
  - Winners (1): 1989–90

== History ==
=== The beginnings ===
OFC Sliven 2000 was founded on 29 February 2000, after the bankruptcy of FC Sliven, but as it is the real representative club of the same-name town, it keeps the tradition started back in 1914 with the first local football club Sportist. Through the years the leading club in Sliven had different names - Asenovetz, DNA, General Zaimov, Mlada Gvardia etc.

=== First Promotions and A Group Period ===
After World War II, Sliven took part in B PFG for ten years before seeing its first promotion to A PFG in season 1963-1964. Up to 2008–09, the club has played 22 seasons at the highest level of Bulgarian football (including continuously from 1974 to 1993). In 1983-84 FC Sliven finished on 7th place in A PFG and qualified for the UEFA Cup for 1984-85 because of reaching the semi-finals in the Soviet Army Cup; the Cup winners Levski Sofia qualified for European Cup; the finalist was not allowed to play in European competitions; where they faced FK Željezničar Sarajevo, winning the first leg 1–0 at home, but suffering a 1–5 defeat in the second leg.

=== First major trophy and European return ===
Sliven had its biggest success in 1990, winning the Bulgarian Cup against CSKA Sofia, with a score of 2–0. The goals were scored by Valeri Valkov and Yordan Letchkov. In the 1990-91 Cup Winners Cup, Sliven were drawn against former European champions Juventus, losing both matches by scores of 0-2 and 1–6, respectively.

=== Bankruptcy and rebirth ===
Sliven could not celebrate the cup success for too long. Over the next few years, the club went into a deep crisis, and was relegated to the regional football groups, eventually culminating in bankruptcy and dissolution. The bankruptcy was largely attributed to the turbulent economic times in Bulgaria after the fall of the communist regime.

Sliven was reborn in 2000 by establishing of the Municipal Football Club (OFC) Sliven 2000, led by club legend Yordan Letchkov. In 2005, the club finally earned promotion back to the second level of Bulgarian football, returning to professionalism.

=== Back Among the Elite and Sudden Downfall ===
In May 2008, Sliven were promoted to the top flight by winning the Eastern group of Bulgaria's second division. In their first year after returning to the elite, season 2008-09, OFC Sliven managed to finish in 12th place, thus avoiding relegation. The team managed to win eight games as well as drawing eight games, earning them 32 points. These results put them six points above Vihren Sandanski, who were relegated. From the eight wins that Sliven achieved, five were from home games, as well six of the draws, while at away games, Sliven managed to win three games and draw twice. Among these wins, Sliven managed to beat Bulgarian powerhouse CSKA Sofia 3–1 at home, as well as winning 3–1 against Botev Plovdiv, a traditionally strong side in Bulgarian football. This first season in the elite was under the management of Georgi Dermendzhiev, who would later successfully coach Ludogorets Razgrad and qualify the team two times for the UEFA Champions League group stage.

Sliven's second season in the Bulgarian elite was under Serbian coach Dragoljub Simonovic, who replaced Dermendzhiev. Sliven again displayed some strong results, winning nine games in total, as well as drawing five games, for a total of 32 points. They finished five points above FC Lokomotiv Mezdra, who were relegated. Sliven managed to win against Levski Sofia at home, one of Bulgaria's best teams. At home, Sliven won six games and drew three games, while away results included three wins and two draws.

Sliven's third consecutive season in the top flight was less successful, however. Dimcho Nenov was appointed as coach for the 2010–11 season. The team finished in last place, with only 4 wins, 7 draws, and 19 losses. This only earned the team 19 points, 6 points behind the 14th place, which would have at least qualified them for the relegation playoffs. Sliven managed three home wins, and only one away win, against fellow relegated Akademik Sofia. This relegation ended their three-year stay in the A PFG.

After their relegation from the elite, Sliven were allocated to the East 2011–12 B Group. The team largely struggled with their performance, mainly due to the fact that many top players left the club after they were relegated. Sliven finished sixth out of 10 teams, a mediocre performance. Things went from bad to worse for Sliven, however. The team began experiencing serious financial problems, which affected their results, but more importantly, their ability to play professional football. On 26 February 2013, the Bulgarian Football Union suspended Sliven's participation in the B Group, as the team could field at most seven senior players. This automatically relegated the team to the V AFG, the third tier of Bulgarian football.

Sliven played in the third tier for three years, before being relegated to the Regional Amateur Leagues, the fourth tier of football.

=== Unofficial successor and new beginning ===
In 2021, an unofficial team from the city was created, called FC Sliven, and began competing in the fourth tier of Bulgarian football, the A RFG of Sliven province, for the 2020–21 season. The club is not considered a direct descendant of OFC Sliven 2000. Before the 2021–22 season, FC Sliven absorbed OFC Sliven, with the latter becoming the youth academy of the former.

At the end of the 2021–22 season, FC Sliven won promotion to the Third League, after just one season since reforming. It was revealed that club legend Yordan Letchkov was the key man behind the success of the team once more, similarly to his financial backing of OFC Sliven 2000. After two seasons in the third level, FC Sliven was relegated to the A RFG Sliven for season 2024–25.

=== Recent Seasons ===
Season		Pos.	Pl.	W	D	L	GS	GA	P	Cup	Notes
2005-06	B PFG	12	26	9	4	13	22	30	31	1/16	
2006-07	B PFG	12	26	4	11	11	32	52	23	1/8	
2007-08	B PFG	1	26	19	3	4	63	23	60	1/8	Promoted
2008-09	A PFG	12	30	8	8	14	32	40	32	1/8	
2009-10	A PFG	13	30	9	5	16	29	40	32	1/8	
2010-11	A PFG	16	30	4	7	19	22	52	19	1/16	Relegated
2011-12	B PFG	6	27	10	6	11	29	23	36	1/32	
2012-13	B PFG	14	26	0	1	25	4	75	-2	1/22	Relegated
2013-14	V AFG	16	32	4	0	28	33	165	12		

=== European cup history ===
Season	Competition	Round	Country	Club	Home	Away	Aggregate
1984/85	UEFA Cup	1	SFR Yugoslavia	FK Zeljeznicar	1-0	1-5	2-5
1990/91	Cup Winners'Cup	1	(Italy)	Juventus	0-2	1-6	1-8

== Colours and nicknames ==
Logo of FC Sliven 1960-00

For the majority of their history FC Sliven have worn red and white colours. When the club was first founded in 1918, red was chosen to represent the blood of Bulgarian Voivodes and white was chosen to represent the freedom. After the bankruptcy of FC Sliven in 2000 the club changed its name to OFC Sliven 2000, its badge, and its colours to orange shirts with blue shorts. One of the nicknames of OFC Sliven 2000 is Voivodite which means "Slavic title that originally denoted the principal commander of a military force". It was chosen because the town Sliven is famous for its Bulgarian Haiduts who fought against the Ottoman Turks in the 19th century and is known as the "City of the 100 Voivodes", a Voivode being a leader of Haiduts.

Kit 1970	Kit 1975	Kit 1988	Kit 1990	Kit 1991-93

Source: sliven-fc.com

== Current squad ==
As of 18 June 2013 Note: Flags indicate national team as defined under FIFA eligibility rules; some limited exceptions apply. Players may hold more than one non-FIFA nationality.

No.	Pos.	Nation	Player
—	GK	BUL	Georgi Kinchev
—	GK	BUL	Petar Debarliev
—	DF	BUL	Yavor Ivanov
—	DF	BUL	Ivan Todorov
—	DF	BUL	Emil Martinov
—	DF	BUL	Stoyan Marinov
—	DF	BUL	Mario Hadzhidimitrov
—	DF	BUL	Boyan Nikolov
—	MF	BUL	Milen Stoyanov
—	MF	BUL	Dobromir Dimitrov

No.	Pos.	Nation	Player
—	MF	BUL	Mitko Mitkov
—	MF	BUL	Lachezar Lechkov
—	MF	BUL	Enver Hristov
—	MF	BUL	Georgi Kolev
—	MF	BUL	Plamen Budakov
—	MF	BUL	Petar Rusev
—	FW	BUL	Aleksandar Balezdrov
—	FW	BUL	Miroslav Mindev
—	FW	BUL	Tolyo Yordanov

== Famous players ==
The following players included were either playing for their respective national teams or left good impression among the fans.

- (Bulgaria) Yordan Letchkov
- (Bulgaria) Nikolay Arabov
- (Bulgaria) Valeri Valkov
- (Bulgaria) Velian Parushev
- (Bulgaria) Vasil Tinchev
- (Bulgaria) Kosta Yanev
- (Bulgaria) Zhivko Kelepov
- (Bulgaria) Ivan Valchev
- (Bulgaria) Vasil Santurov
- (Bulgaria) Radia Doychev
- (Bulgaria) Plamen Timnev
- (Bulgaria) Ivan Stoyanov

Note: For a complete list of Sliven players, see Category:FC Sliven players.

== Stadium ==
The stadium Hadzhi Dimitar in Sliven (15,000 seats) was built in the 1950s. First big reconstructions were run in the period 1984 - 1989. Currently Hadzhi Dimitar is part of a big multifunctional sports compound, still under development - at completion featuring hotel, restaurant, 2 training grass pitches, tennis courts, swimming pool. The athletic track of Hadzhi Dimitar is meeting all requirements of IAAF for hosting international competitions. The stadium complex has the only training pitch with FieldTurf flooring in Bulgaria. The size of the official pitch is 105m x 68m. Record attendance of the stadium is 30,000 people.
