= 1983 Bulgarian Cup final =

- Event: 1982–83 Bulgarian Cup
CSKA Sofia	Spartak Varna
4	0
- Date: 3 April 1983
- Venue: Plovdiv Stadium, Plovdiv
- Referee: Bogdan Dochev (Sofia)
- Attendance: 15,000

The 1983 Bulgarian Cup final was the 43rd final of the Bulgarian Cup, and was contested between CSKA Sofia and Spartak Varna on 3 April 1983 at Plovdiv Stadium in Plovdiv. CSKA won the final 4–0.

== Match ==
=== Details ===
3 April 1983

CSKA Sofia	4−0	Spartak Varna
Yonchev 18', 20'; Markov 39'; Mladenov 55'

Plovdiv Stadium, Plovdiv
Attendance: 15,000
Referee: Bogdan Dochev (Sofia)

CSKA	Spartak

GK	1	(Bulgaria) Georgi Velinov
DF	2	(Bulgaria) Krasimir Bezinski
DF	3	(Bulgaria) Dinko Dimitrov
DF	4	(Bulgaria) Vasil Tinchev
DF	5	(Bulgaria) Georgi Iliev
MF	6	(Bulgaria) Radoslav Zdravkov
MF	7	(Bulgaria) Tsvetan Yonchev	(substituted off) 69'
FW	8	(Bulgaria) Georgi Slavkov
FW	9	(Bulgaria) Spas Dzhevizov
MF	10	(Bulgaria) Plamen Markov	(substituted off) 75'
FW	11	(Bulgaria) Stoycho Mladenov
Substitutes:
MF	--	(Bulgaria) Valeri Kulinov	(substituted in) 69'
DF	--	(Bulgaria) Yancho Bogomilov	(substituted in) 75'
Manager:
(Bulgaria) Manol Manolov

GK	1	(Bulgaria) Krasimir Zafirov
DF	2	(Bulgaria) Encho Nedev
DF	3	(Bulgaria) Krasen Krastev
DF	4	(Bulgaria) Vladimir Nikolchev
DF	5	(Bulgaria) Sasho Borisov
MF	6	(Bulgaria) Krasimir Venkov
MF	7	(Bulgaria) Stefan Stefanov	(substituted off) 46'
MF	8	(Bulgaria) Borislav Gyorev
FW	9	(Bulgaria) Ivan Petrov	(substituted off) 71'
MF	10	(Bulgaria) Zhivko Gospodinov
FW	11	(Bulgaria) Stefan Naydenov
Substitutes:
MF	--	(Bulgaria) Plamen Kazakov	(substituted in) 46'
FW	--	(Bulgaria) Georgi Aleksiev	(substituted in) 71'
Manager:
(Bulgaria) Ivan Vutsov

== See also ==
- 1982–83 A Group
- 1983 Cup of the Soviet Army Final
