= 1981–82 PFC Cherno More Varna season =

Bulgarian association football team

Cherno More
1981–82 season
- Manager: Spas Kirov
- A Group: 4th
- Bulgarian Cup: Second round (knocked out by Dobrudzha)
- Top goalscorer: Rafi Rafiev & Todor Atanasov (9)
- Biggest win: 6–2 (vs Etar, 27 May 1982)
- Biggest defeat: 3–0 (vs Etar, 5 Dec 1981); 3–0 (vs Sliven, 13 March 1982); 3–0 (vs CSKA, 30 May 1982)

This page covers all relevant details regarding PFC Cherno More Varna for all official competitions inside the 1981–82 season. These are A Group and Bulgarian Cup.

== Squad ==
Goalkeepers
(Bulgaria) Borislav Manolkov
(Bulgaria) Vasko Vladimirov
(Bulgaria) Georgi Popov

Defenders
(Bulgaria) Georgi Zhekov
(Bulgaria) Todor Marev
(Bulgaria) Svetozar Svetozarov
(Bulgaria) Ivan Ivanov

Midfielders
(Bulgaria) Ivan Donchev
(Bulgaria) Yancho Bogomilov
(Bulgaria) Georgi Kondov
(Bulgaria) Todor Atanasov
(Bulgaria) Milen Bakardzhiev
(Bulgaria) Veroni Strashnikov
(Bulgaria) Plamen Kazakov

Forwards
(Bulgaria) Petar Petrov
(Bulgaria) Rafi Rafiev
(Bulgaria) Todor Yordanov
(Bulgaria) Plamen Ganev

== Matches ==
=== A Group ===
23 August 1981 Round 1	Cherno More	2 – 1	Trakia Plovdiv	Varna
19:30 EEST	Bakardzhiev 25'; Rafiev 36'		Slavkov 5'

30 August 1981 Round 2	Slavia Sofia	1 – 2	Cherno More	Sofia
18:00 EEST	Durev 36'		Atanasov 67'; Ganev 83'

5 September 1981 Round 3	Cherno More	2 – 2	Sliven	Varna
17:30 EEST	Atanasov 2' (pen.), 11'		Dobrev 38'; Valchev 41'

12 September 1981 Round 4	Botev Vratsa	1 – 3	Cherno More	Vratsa
17:30 EEST	Hristov 69' (pen.)		Kondov 12'; Ganev 20'; Rafiev 43'

20 September 1981 Round 5	Cherno More	1 – 0	Akademik Sofia	Varna
17:30 EEST	Kondov 79'

26 September 1981 Round 6	Haskovo	2 – 1	Cherno More	Haskovo
17:30 EEST	Sirakov 68'; Georgiev 73'		Atanasov 48'

4 October 1981 Round 7	Cherno More	2 – 0	Beroe Stara Zagora	Varna
15:30 EEST	Ganev 14', 57'

21 October 1981 Round 8	Cherno More	1 – 0	Lokomotiv Sofia	Varna
15:30 EEST	Strashnikov 24'

24 October 1981 Round 9	Belasitsa Petrich	1 – 0	Cherno More	Petrich
15:30 EEST	Yanev 75'

31 October 1981 Round 10	Cherno More	2 – 0	Chernomorets Burgas	Varna
15:30 EEST	Atanasov 20'; Kazakov 83'

15 November 1981 Round 11	Levski-Spartak Sofia	4 – 2	Cherno More	Sofia
15:00 EEST	Kurdov 23'; Spasov 28'; Barzov 63' (pen.); Nikolov 66'		Rafiev 18'; P. Petrov 89' (o.g.)

28 November 1981 Round 12	Cherno More	1 – 0	Spartak Pleven	Varna
15:00 EEST	Atanasov 5'

5 December 1981 Round 13	Etar Veliko Tarnovo	3 – 0	Cherno More	Veliko Tarnovo
14:30 EEST	Nenchev 12', 57'; Mihaylov 55'

12 December 1981 Round 14	Cherno More	2 – 1	CSKA Septemvriysko Zname Sofia	Varna
14:30 EEST	Kondov 33'; Atanasov 42'		Mladenov 18'

19 December 1981 Round 15	Marek Stanke Dimitrov	2 – 1	Cherno More	Stanke Dimitrov
14:30 EEST	Sergiev 60'; Arsov 62'		Rafiev 33'

24 February 1982 Round 16	Trakia Plovdiv	2 – 0	Cherno More	Plovdiv
16:00 EEST	Argirov 37', 75'

6 March 1982 Round 17	Cherno More	0 – 1	Slavia Sofia	Varna
15:00 EEST			Minchev 86' (pen.)

13 March 1982 Round 18	Sliven	3 – 0	Cherno More	Sliven
16:00 EEST	Shalamanov 12'; Dobrev 30'; Mirchev 48'

20 March 1982 Round 19	Cherno More	3 – 1	Botev Vratsa	Varna
16:00 EEST	Ganev 7', 35'; I. Ivanov 25'		Danov 75'

26 March 1982 Round 20	Akademik Sofia	0 – 0	Cherno More	Sofia
16:00 EEST

3 April 1982 Round 21	Cherno More	3 – 1	Haskovo	Varna
17:30 EEST	Bogomilov 10'; Ganev 15'; Kazakov 56'		Topuzakov 58'

10 April 1982 Round 22	Beroe Stara Zagora	0 – 0	Cherno More	Stara Zagora
17:30 EEST

17 April 1982 Round 23	Lokomotiv Sofia	0 – 0	Cherno More	Sofia
19:00 EEST

24 April 1982 Round 24	Cherno More	2 – 0	Belasitsa Petrich	Varna
17:30 EEST	Rafiev 12', 60'

1 May 1982 Round 25	Chernomorets Burgas	2 – 1	Cherno More	Burgas
18:00 EEST	Iliev 42'; Madzharov 85'		Donchev 27'

19 May 1982 Round 26	Cherno More	1 – 1	Levski-Spartak Sofia	Varna
18:00 EEST	Atanasov 20'		Barzov 53' (pen.)

21 May 1982 Round 27	Spartak Pleven	3 – 2	Cherno More	Pleven
18:00 EEST	I. Ivanov 11' (o.g.); Dzhaferski 38'; Krastanov 71'		Rafiev 19'; Donchev 81' (pen.)

27 May 1982 Round 28	Cherno More	6 – 2	Etar Veliko Tarnovo	Varna
18:00 EEST	Atanasov 3' (pen.); I. Ivanov 5'; Rafiev 21'; Donchev 78'; Strashnikov 83'; Svetozarov 85'		Lahchiev 27' (pen.), 88'

30 May 1982 Round 29	CSKA Septemvriysko Zname Sofia	3 – 0	Cherno More	Sofia
18:00 EEST	Yonchev 34'; G. Dimitrov 47', 66'

5 June 1982 Round 30	Cherno More	1 – 0	Marek Stanke Dimitrov	Varna
18:30 EEST	Rafiev 89'

==== League table ====
Pos	Team	Pld	W	D	L	GF	GA	GD	Pts	Qualification or relegation
2	Levski Sofia	30	20	6	4	71	32	+39	46	Qualification for UEFA Cup first round
3	Slavia Sofia	30	15	5	10	35	33	+2	35	Qualification for UEFA Cup first round
4	Cherno More Varna	30	14	5	11	41	37	+4	33	
5	Lokomotiv Sofia	30	13	6	11	41	37	+4	32	Qualification for Cup Winners' Cup first round
6	Chernomorets Burgas	30	14	4	12	48	44	+4	32	

Source: rsssf.com

==== Results summary ====
Overall								Home						Away					
Pld	W	D	L	GF	GA	GD	Pts	W	D	L	GF	GA	GD	W	D	L	GF	GA	GD
30	14	5	11	41	37	+4	47	12	2	1	29	10	+19	2	3	10	12	27	−15

==== League performance ====
Round	1	2	3	4	5	6	7	8	9	10	11	12	13	14	15	16	17	18	19	20	21	22	23	24	25	26	27	28	29	30
Ground	H	A	H	A	H	A	H	H	A	H	A	H	A	H	A	A	H	A	H	A	H	A	A	H	A	H	A	H	A	H
Result	W	W	D	W	W	L	W	W	L	W	L	W	L	W	L	L	L	L	W	D	W	D	D	W	L	D	L	W	L	W

A = Away; H = Home; W = Win; D = Draw; L = Loss

==== Goalscorers in A Group ====
Rank	Scorer	Goals
1	(Bulgaria) Todor Atanasov	9
1	(Bulgaria) Rafi Rafiev	9
3	(Bulgaria) Plamen Ganev	7
4	(Bulgaria) Ivan Donchev	3
4	(Bulgaria) Georgi Kondov	3
6	(Bulgaria) Plamen Kazakov	2
6	(Bulgaria) Veroni Strashnikov	2
6	(Bulgaria) Ivan Ivanov	2
9	(Bulgaria) Svetozar Svetozarov	1
9	(Bulgaria) Milen Bakardzhiev	1
9	(Bulgaria) Yancho Bogomilov	1

=== Bulgarian Cup ===
2 December 1981 1/32	Cherno More	1 – 0	Dorostol Silistra	Varna

8 December 1981 1/16	Dobrudzha Dobrich	2 – 0	Cherno More	Dobrich
