= 1986 Bulgarian Cup final =

- Event: 1985–86 Bulgarian Cup
| Levski Sofia | CSKA Sofia |
| 2 | 1 |
- Date: 27 April 1986
- Venue: Vasil Levski National Stadium, Sofia
- Referee: Bogdan Dochev (Sofia)
- Attendance: 28,000

The 1986 Bulgarian Cup final was the 46th final of the Bulgarian Cup, and was contested between Levski Sofia and CSKA Sofia on 27 April 1986 at Vasil Levski National Stadium in Sofia. Levski won the final 2–1.

== Match ==
=== Details ===
27 April 1986

| Levski Sofia | 2−1 | CSKA Sofia |
|---|---|---|
| Valchev 3', 22' | | Slavkov 56' (pen.) |

Vasil Levski National Stadium, Sofia
Attendance: 28,000
Referee: Bogdan Dochev (Sofia)

| Levski | CSKA |

| GK | 1 | (Bulgaria) Vladimir Delchev |
| DF | 2 | (Bulgaria) Krasimir Koev |
| DF | 3 | (Bulgaria) Antoni Zdravkov |
| DF | 4 | (Bulgaria) Stoil Georgiev |
| DF | 5 | (Bulgaria) Nikolay Iliev |
| MF | 6 | (Bulgaria) Dimitar Markov |
| FW | 7 | (Bulgaria) Rusi Gochev (c) | (substituted off) 78' |
| MF | 8 | (Bulgaria) Plamen Tsvetkov |
| FW | 9 | (Bulgaria) Mihail Valchev | (substituted off) 88' |
| MF | 10 | (Bulgaria) Georgi Yordanov |
| MF | 11 | (Bulgaria) Vladko Shalamanov |
Substitutes:
| FW | -- | (Bulgaria) Rosen Krumov | (substituted in) 78' |
| MF | -- | (Bulgaria) Nikolay Todorov | (substituted in) 88' |
Manager:
(Bulgaria) Kiril Ivkov

| GK | 1 | (Bulgaria) Georgi Velinov (c) |
| DF | 2 | (Bulgaria) Nedyalko Mladenov |
| DF | 3 | (Bulgaria) Aydan Ilyazov |
| DF | 4 | (Bulgaria) Krasimir Bezinski | (substituted off) 83' |
| DF | 5 | (Bulgaria) Angel Chervenkov |
| MF | 6 | (Bulgaria) Kostadin Yanchev |
| MF | 7 | (Bulgaria) Ivaylo Kirov |
| FW | 8 | (Bulgaria) Georgi Slavkov |
| FW | 9 | (Bulgaria) Lyuboslav Penev |
| MF | 10 | (Bulgaria) Ruzhin Kerimov | (substituted off) 57' |
| FW | 11 | (Bulgaria) Yordan Dimitrov |
Substitutes:
| FW | -- | (Bulgaria) Emil Kostadinov | (substituted in) 57' |
| FW | -- | (Bulgaria) Rumen Stoyanov | (substituted in) 83' |
Manager:
(Bulgaria) Dimitar Penev

== See also ==
- 1985–86 A Group
