= 1982 FIFA World Cup qualification – UEFA Group 1 =

Football tournament qualification stage

Group 1 consisted of five of the 34 teams entered into the European zone: Albania, Austria, Bulgaria, Finland, and West Germany. These five teams competed on a home-and-away basis for two of the 14 spots in the final tournament allocated to the European zone, with the group's winner and runner-up claiming those spots.

== Standings ==
Rank	Team	Pts	Pld	W	D	L	GF	GA	GD
1	West Germany	16	8	8	0	0	33	3	+30
2	Austria	11	8	5	1	2	16	6	+10
3	Bulgaria	9	8	4	1	3	11	10	+1
4	Albania	2	8	1	0	7	4	22	−18
5	Finland	2	8	1	0	7	4	27	−23

=== Results ===
4 June 1980

Finland	0–2	Bulgaria
	Report	P. Markov 28'; Kostadinov 81'

Helsingin Olympiastadion, Helsinki
Attendance: 7,805
Referee: Brian McGinlay (Scotland)

3 September 1980

Albania	2–0	Finland
Braho 2'; Baçi 18'	Report

Stadiumi Kombetar Qemal Stafa, Tirana
Attendance: 19,211
Referee: Emmanuel Platopoulos (Greece)

24 September 1980

Finland	0–2	Austria
	Report	Jara 13'; Welzl 77'

Helsingin Olympiastadion, Helsinki
Attendance: 8,099
Referee: Clive Thomas (Wales)

19 October 1980

Bulgaria	2–1	Albania
Zhelyazkov 14'; Slavkov 51'	Report	Përnaska 69'

Vasil Levski National Stadium, Sofia
Attendance: 16,000
Referee: Talat Tokat (Turkey)

15 November 1980

Austria	5–0	Albania
Pezzey 20'; Schachner 26', 35'; Welzl 57'; Krankl 85'	Report

Praterstadion, Vienna
Attendance: 28,520
Referee: Rudolf Renngli (Switzerland)

3 December 1980

Bulgaria	1–3	West Germany
Yonchev 66'	Report	Kaltz 14', 36' (pen.); K.H. Rummenigge 54'

Vasil Levski National Stadium, Sofia
Attendance: 45,000
Referee: Riccardo Lattanzi (Italy)

6 December 1980

Albania	0–1	Austria
	Report	Welzl 38'

Stadiumi Kombetar Qemal Stafa, Tirana
Attendance: 19,211
Referee: László Pádár (Hungary)

1 April 1981

Albania	0–2	West Germany
	Report	Schuster 9', 71'

Stadiumi Kombetar Qemal Stafa, Tirana
Attendance: 19,203
Referee: Antonín Vencl (Czechoslovakia)

29 April 1981

West Germany	2–0	Austria
Krauss 30' (o.g.); Fischer 36'	Report

Volksparkstadion, Hamburg
Attendance: 61,418
Referee: Charles Corver (Netherlands)

13 May 1981

Bulgaria	4–0	Finland
Slavkov 10', 53'; Kostadinov 55'; Tsvetkov 90'	Report

Vasil Levski National Stadium, Sofia, Sofia, Bulgaria
Attendance: 12,000
Referee: Egon Šoštarić (Yugoslavia)

24 May 1981

Finland	0–4	West Germany
	Report	Briegel 26'; Fischer 37', 80'; Kaltz 40'

Keskusurheilukenttä, Lahti
Attendance: 10,030
Referee: John Carpenter (Republic of Ireland)

28 May 1981

Austria	2–0	Bulgaria
Krankl 30' (pen.); Jara 88'	Report

Praterstadion, Vienna
Attendance: 52,000
Referee: Pat Partridge (England)

17 June 1981

Austria	5–1	Finland
Prohaska 16', 18'; Krankl 49'; Welzl 56'; Jurtin 65'	Report	Valvee 71'

Linzer Stadion‚ Linz
Attendance: 25,700
Referee: Alojzy Jarguz (Poland)

2 September 1981

Finland	2–1	Albania
Houtsonen 61'; Kousa 85'	Report	Targaj 47' (pen.)

Kotkan Urheilukeskus, Kotka
Attendance: 6,830
Referee: Ib Nielsen (Denmark)

23 September 1981

West Germany	7–1	Finland
Fischer 11'; K.H. Rummenigge 42', 60', 72'; Breitner 54', 67'; Dremmler 83'	Report	Turunen 41'

Ruhrstadion, Bochum
Attendance: 40,817
Referee: Norbert Rolles (Luxembourg)

14 October 1981

Albania	0–2	Bulgaria
	Report	Slavkov 49'; Mladenov 84'

Stadiumi Kombetar Qemal Stafa, Tirana
Attendance: 19,213
Referee: Adolf Prokop (East Germany)

14 October 1981

Austria	1–3	West Germany
Schachner 15'	Report	Littbarski 17', 77'; Magath 20'

Praterstadion, Vienna
Attendance: 69,400
Referee: Alexis Ponnet (Belgium)

11 November 1981

Bulgaria	0–0	Austria
	Report

Vasil Levski National Stadium, Sofia
Attendance: 25,000
Referee: Michel Vautrot (France)

18 November 1981

West Germany	8–0	Albania
K.H. Rummenigge 5', 19', 43'; Fischer 32', 72'; Kaltz 36'; Littbarski 52'; Breitner 68' (pen.)	Report

Westfalenstadion, Dortmund
Attendance: 43,000
Referee: Reidar Bjørnestad (Norway)

22 November 1981

West Germany	4–0	Bulgaria
Fischer 4'; K.H. Rummenigge 49', 83'; Kaltz 62' (pen.)	Report

Rheinstadion, Düsseldorf
Attendance: 55,000
Referee: Erik Fredriksson (Sweden)
