= 1985 Bulgarian Cup final =

- Event: 1984–85 Bulgarian Cup
CSKA Sofia	Levski Sofia
A Group	A Group
2	1
- Date: 19 June 1985
- Venue: Vasil Levski National Stadium, Sofia
- Referee: Ahmed Yasharov (Sofia)
- Attendance: 35,000

The 1985 Bulgarian Cup final was the 45th final of the Bulgarian Cup, and was contested between CSKA Sofia and Levski Sofia on 19 June 1985 at Vasil Levski National Stadium in Sofia. CSKA won the final 2–1.

== Match ==
The game ran on high emotions fueled by the streak of consecutive victories of Levski over CSKA in the 2 years prior to the game. The controversial decisions of the referee led to confrontations both on the field and on the stands. By a decree of the Central Committee of the Bulgarian Communist Party some of the leading players both of the Levski and CSKA teams were suspended from the sport for different lengths, including in the case of Hristo Stoichkov for life. The championship title of the club for 1985 was suspended. However, the suspensions were lifted in 1986. PFC Levski Sofia was renamed to Vitosha, while CSKA was renamed to Sredets, with the previous names being restored in 1989.

=== Details ===
19 June 1985

CSKA Sofia	2–1	Levski Sofia
Slavkov 26'; Voynov 53'		Sirakov 82' (pen.)

Vasil Levski National Stadium, Sofia
Attendance: 35,000
Referee: Ahmed Yasharov (Sofia)

CSKA	Levski

CSKA:
GK	1	(Bulgaria) Krasimir Dossev
DF	2	(Bulgaria) Krasimir Bezinski
MF	3	(Bulgaria) Radoslav Zdravkov		(substituted off) 74'
DF	4	(Bulgaria) Vasil Tinchev
DF	5	(Bulgaria) Georgi Dimitrov (c)
MF	6	(Bulgaria) Kostadin Yanchev	(red card) 78'
MF	7	(Bulgaria) Iliya Voynov
FW	8	(Bulgaria) Georgi Slavkov
MF	9	(Bulgaria) Lachezar Tanev
MF	10	(Bulgaria) Plamen Markov		(substituted off) 89'
FW	11	(Bulgaria) Hristo Stoichkov
Substitutes:
DF		(Bulgaria) Pavlin Shoylevski		(substituted in) 74'
MF		(Bulgaria) Yordan Dimitrov		(substituted in) 89'
Manager:
(Bulgaria) Manol Manolov

Levski:
GK	1	(Bulgaria) Borislav Mihaylov
DF	2	(Bulgaria) Plamen Nikolov	(red card) 73'
DF	3	(Bulgaria) Antoni Zdravkov		(substituted off) 59'
DF	4	(Bulgaria) Petar Petrov
DF	5	(Bulgaria) Nikolay Iliev
MF	6	(Bulgaria) Emil Velev
MF	7	(Bulgaria) Rusi Gochev (c)
FW	8	(Bulgaria) Nasko Sirakov
FW	9	(Bulgaria) Mihail Valchev
MF	10	(Bulgaria) Emil Spasov	(red card) 78'
MF	11	(Bulgaria) Nikolay Todorov		(substituted off) 59'
Substitutes:
DF		(Bulgaria) Kalin Bankov		(substituted in) 59'
MF		(Bulgaria) Miroslav Baychev		(substituted in) 59'
Manager:
(Bulgaria) Vasil Metodiev

== See also ==
- 1984–85 A Group
- 1985 Cup of the Soviet Army Final
