= 1982–83 A Group =

39th season of top-tier football league in Bulgaria

A Group
- Season: 1982–83
- Champions: CSKA Sofia (23rd title)
- Relegated: Rozova Dolina; Pirin
- European Cup: CSKA Sofia
- UEFA Cup: Levski Sofia
- Matches: 240
- Goals: 640 (2.67 per match)
- Top goalscorer: Antim Pehlivanov (20 goals)

The 1982–83 A Group was the 35th season of the A Football Group, the top Bulgarian professional league for association football clubs, since its establishment in 1948.

== Overview ==
It was contested by 16 teams, and CSKA Sofia won the championship.

== League standings ==
Pos	Team	Pld	W	D	L	GF	GA	GD	Pts	Qualification or relegation (Note: Lokomotiv Plovdiv, which participated in the B Group, won the 1982–83 Cup of the Soviet Army and thus qualified for the 1983–84 UEFA Cup first round.)
1	CSKA Sofia (C)	30	18	9	3	52	26	+26	45	Qualification for European Cup first round
2	Levski Sofia	30	18	6	6	50	21	+29	42	Qualification for UEFA Cup first round
3	Trakia Plovdiv	30	16	6	8	62	40	+22	38	
4	Lokomotiv Sofia	30	12	8	10	39	40	−1	32	
5	Spartak Pleven (R)	30	13	5	12	46	40	+6	31	Relegation to 1983–84 B Group (Note: Spartak Pleven was relegated after the end of the season due to allegations of match fixing and bribery)
6	Sliven	30	13	4	13	46	45	+1	30	
7	Spartak Varna	30	12	5	13	36	38	−2	29	Qualification for Cup Winners' Cup first round (Note: Spartak Varna qualified for Cup Winners' Cup as a finalists in the 1982–83 Bulgarian Cup)
8	Etar Veliko Tarnovo	30	13	3	14	38	41	−3	29	
9	Cherno More Varna	30	9	11	10	24	28	−4	29	
10	Belasitsa Petrich	30	12	5	13	43	54	−11	29	
11	Botev Vratsa	30	13	4	13	38	35	+3	28 (Note: 2 points deducted due to the performance of their second team in its level three group.)	
12	Slavia Sofia	30	11	6	13	35	37	−2	28	
13	Chernomorets Burgas	30	12	4	14	41	47	−6	28	
14	Haskovo	30	9	4	17	34	41	−7	22	
15	Rozova Dolina Kazanlak (R)	30	7	5	18	30	53	−23	19	Relegation to 1983–84 B Group
16	Pirin Blagoevgrad (R)	30	7	5	18	26	54	−28	19	Relegation to 1983–84 B Group

Source: rsssf.com
(C) Champions; (R) Relegated

== Results ==
Home \ Away	BEL	BVR	CHM	CHB	CSK	ETA	HAS	LEV	LSO	PIR	ROZ	SLA	SLI	SPL	SPV	TRA
Belasitsa Petrich		4–1	2–1	4–0	0–0	1–0	2–1	2–0	2–0	6–4	3–2	2–1	1–0	0–0	3–1	1–1
Botev Vratsa	4–0		1–0	2–3	2–3	0–2	2–1	0–0	0–0	2–0	1–0	3–0	2–2	4–1	2–1	1–0
Cherno More	3–1	1–0		1–0	0–0	1–0	1–0	1–1	1–1	6–0	3–1	0–0	2–1	0–2	0–0	0–0
Chernomorets Burgas	3–0	0–4	0–1		1–4	2–0	2–1	1–1	1–0	2–0	5–2	0–0	1–1	3–2	1–0	3–0
CSKA Sofia	4–2	1–0	3–0	4–2		1–1	2–1	0–3	3–1	2–0	3–0	3–1	3–1	2–1	3–0	2–0
Etar Veliko Tarnovo	4–2	1–0	1–0	3–0	0–1		2–0	2–1	2–2	3–1	2–1	2–1	3–0	1–0	3–0	0–3
Haskovo	1–0	0–1	0–0	1–0	1–1	3–0		0–1	1–0	2–2	4–0	3–1	4–3	2–1	1–0	0–1
Levski Sofia	3–0	3–0	3–1	1–0	0–0	3–1	1–0		1–0	2–1	3–0	4–0	6–2	1–0	1–0	2–0
Lokomotiv Sofia	1–1	2–1	2–1	3–2	1–1	2–1	3–0	2–1		3–1	2–1	2–2	1–0	3–1	0–0	4–2
Pirin Blagoevgrad	0–0	0–2	0–0	2–1	0–1	2–0	3–1	1–1	1–0		0–0	1–2	1–0	0–4	2–0	2–0
Rozova Dolina	2–0	1–2	0–0	1–2	2–0	0–0	1–0	1–1	1–2	1–0		0–1	2–1	4–1	1–0	3–3
Slavia Sofia	2–1	1–0	3–0	1–2	2–0	6–2	1–1	1–4	0–0	1–0	4–0		2–1	0–1	2–0	0–0
Sliven	4–0	1–0	0–0	3–1	1–1	1–0	3–1	1–0	1–0	2–1	2–1	1–0		2–1	5–0	3–2
Spartak Pleven	2–1	4–1	0–0	1–1	2–2	3–1	2–1	0–1	2–0	2–0	3–0	1–0	3–2		1–1	4–3
Spartak Varna	4–1	0–0	2–0	2–1	0–1	2–0	2–1	2–1	3–0	4–0	4–2	1–0	3–0	1–0		1–1
Trakia Plovdiv	5–1	3–0	4–0	2–1	1–1	2–1	3–2	2–0	6–2	4–1	1–0	2–0	3–2	3–1	5–2	

Source: A PFG (in Bulgarian)
Legend: Blue = home team win; Yellow = draw; Red = away team win.

== Champions ==
CSKA Sofia

Goalkeepers
(Bulgaria) Georgi Velinov	30	(0)
(Bulgaria) Krasimir Dosev	2	(0)

Defenders
(Bulgaria) Georgi Dimitrov	17	(2)
(Bulgaria) Georgi Iliev	17	(1)
(Bulgaria) Krasimir Bezinski	25	(0)
(Bulgaria) Aleksandar Aleksandrov	16	(0)
(Bulgaria) Yancho Bogomilov	16	(0)
(Bulgaria) Dinko Dimitrov	23	(0)
(Bulgaria) Nedyalko Mladenov	9	(0)
(Bulgaria) Vasil Tinchev	29	(0)

Midfielders
(Bulgaria) Plamen Markov	27	(2)
(Bulgaria) Radoslav Zdravkov	29	(14)
(Bulgaria) Valeri Kulinov	9	(0)
(Bulgaria) Tsvetan Yonchev	29	(8)
(Bulgaria) Ruzhin Kerimov	19	(2)

Forwards
(Bulgaria) Spas Dzhevizov	22	(7)
(Bulgaria) Stoycho Mladenov	27	(9)
(Bulgaria) Georgi Slavkov	26	(7)

Manager
(Bulgaria) Boris Stankov

== Top scorers ==
Rank	Scorer	Club	Goals
1	(Bulgaria) Antim Pehlivanov	Trakia Plovdiv	20
2	(Bulgaria) Kostadin Kabranov	Belasitsa Petrich	17
3	(Bulgaria) Mihail Valchev	Levski Sofia	16
4	(Bulgaria) Plamen Getov	Spartak Pleven	15
5	(Bulgaria) Radoslav Zdravkov	CSKA Sofia	14
6	(Bulgaria) Emil Marinov	Botev Vratsa	13
7	(Bulgaria) Krasimir Kovachev	Etar Veliko Tarnovo	11
7	(Bulgaria) Stefan Naydenov	Spartak Varna	11
9	(Bulgaria) Ivan Pritargov	Chernomorets Burgas	10
9	(Bulgaria) Lachezar Tanev	Spartak Pleven	10
9	(Bulgaria) Tsvetan Danov	Botev Vratsa	10
9	(Bulgaria) Boris Iliev	Lokomotiv Sofia	10

== Attendances ==
#	Club	Average
1	Trakia	13,733
2	Rozova	12,154
3	CSKA Sofia	10,968
4	Levski	10,602
5	Chernomorets	10,521
6	Sliven	10,462
7	Pirin	9,923
8	Pleven	9,667
9	Haskovo	9,487
10	Etar	9,467
11	Varna	9,367
12	Belasitsa	8,933
13	Botev	8,561
14	Cherno More	7,042
15	Slavia Sofia	4,867
16	Lokomotiv Sofia	4,600
