= 1981–82 A Group =

38th season of top-tier football league in Bulgaria

A Group
- Season: 1981–82
- Champions: CSKA Sofia (22nd title)
- Relegated: Beroe, Akademik Sofia
- European Cup: CSKA Sofia
- UEFA Cup: Levski Sofia; Slavia Sofia
- Matches: 240
- Goals: 647 (2.7 per match)
- Top goalscorer: Mihail Valchev (24 goals)

The 1981–82 A Group was the 34th season of the A Football Group, the top Bulgarian professional league for association football clubs, since its establishment in 1948.

== Overview ==
It was contested by 16 teams, and CSKA Sofia won the championship.

== League standings ==
Pos	Team	Pld	W	D	L	GF	GA	GD	Pts	Qualification or relegation
1	CSKA Sofia (C)	30	22	3	5	73	27	+46	47	Qualification for European Cup first round
2	Levski Sofia	30	20	6	4	71	32	+39	46	Qualification for UEFA Cup first round
3	Slavia Sofia	30	15	5	10	35	33	+2	35	Qualification for UEFA Cup first round
4	Cherno More Varna	30	14	5	11	41	37	+4	33	
5	Lokomotiv Sofia	30	13	6	11	41	37	+4	32	Qualification for Cup Winners' Cup first round
6	Chernomorets Burgas	30	14	4	12	48	44	+4	32	
7	Trakia Plovdiv	30	13	4	13	46	42	+4	30	
8	Haskovo	30	12	6	12	34	37	−3	30	
9	Spartak Pleven	30	13	3	14	40	40	0	29	
10	Etar Veliko Tarnovo	30	9	10	11	46	48	−2	28	
11	Sliven	30	10	7	13	38	40	−2	27	
12	Belasitsa Petrich	30	11	5	14	32	43	−11	27	
13	Marek Dupnitsa	30	9	8	13	23	40	−17	26	
14	Botev Vratsa	30	7	8	15	23	41	−18	22	
15	Beroe Stara Zagora (R)	30	7	5	18	33	51	−18	19	Relegation to 1982–83 B Group
16	Akademik Sofia (R)	30	6	5	19	23	55	−32	17	Relegation to 1982–83 B Group

Source: rsssf.com
(C) Champions; (R) Relegated

== Results ==
Home \ Away	AKD	BEL	BSZ	BVR	CHM	CHB	CSK	ETA	HAS	MAR	LEV	LSO	SLA	SLI	SPL	TRA
Akademik Sofia		0–0	0–3	1–2	0–0	0–2	0–3	3–1	1–1	0–1	1–3	1–3	0–2	1–0	1–0	2–1
Belasitsa Petrich	5–1		4–1	1–0	1–0	5–1	1–1	2–1	2–0	1–0	0–0	0–0	1–0	2–0	2–1	0–1
Beroe Stara Zagora	0–1	4–2		1–0	0–0	2–0	0–1	2–2	0–2	1–1	1–2	1–2	0–2	2–1	2–0	1–1
Botev Vratsa	1–0	0–0	2–1		1–3	2–0	2–4	2–3	0–0	1–0	0–1	1–1	0–0	2–0	0–2	1–0
Cherno More	1–0	2–0	2–0	3–1		2–0	2–1	6–2	3–1	1–0	1–1	1–0	0–1	2–2	1–0	2–1
Chernomorets Burgas	1–2	6–0	1–0	2–2	2–1		2–1	3–0	1–0	5–0	2–1	1–0	1–1	1–4	4–1	2–1
CSKA Sofia	3–1	5–0	4–1	3–1	3–0	3–1		4–1	5–1	2–0	2–2	1–2	0–1	3–1	4–1	3–0
Etar Veliko Tarnovo	3–1	2–0	2–1	1–1	3–0	1–1	1–0		1–1	0–0	0–0	1–1	1–1	3–1	2–0	5–1
Haskovo	1–0	1–0	0–1	3–0	2–1	2–0	1–2	1–0		3–0	2–2	1–0	0–0	1–1	2–0	2–1
Marek Dupnitsa	2–2	2–1	1–1	0–0	2–1	1–0	0–0	1–0	1–0		1–3	2–0	2–0	1–1	1–1	4–1
Levski Sofia	6–1	4–0	3–1	3–0	4–2	5–3	1–2	4–2	4–1	3–0		2–1	4–0	1–0	5–3	2–2
Lokomotiv Sofia	1–0	2–1	3–1	2–0	0–0	3–0	2–4	2–1	2–1	3–0	1–2		4–2	1–1	0–0	3–1
Slavia Sofia	2–0	3–0	3–1	2–0	1–2	0–2	2–4	1–1	2–1	2–0	1–0	1–0		1–0	1–0	1–3
Sliven	1–1	1–0	4–3	1–0	3–0	2–2	0–2	3–2	2–3	2–0	0–1	2–0	3–1		1–0	0–0
Spartak Pleven	2–0	3–1	2–0	2–0	3–2	0–1	0–1	3–3	2–0	2–0	1–0	4–1	3–0	2–1		2–1
Trakia Plovdiv	4–2	1–0	3–1	1–1	2–0	2–1	0–2	2–1	3–0	3–0	1–2	4–1	0–1	2–0	3–0	

Source: A PFG (in Bulgarian)
Legend: Blue = home team win; Yellow = draw; Red = away team win.

== Champions ==
CSKA Sofia

Goalkeepers
(Bulgaria) Georgi Velinov	30	(0)
(Bulgaria) Krasimir Dosev	0	(0)

Defenders
(Bulgaria) Georgi Dimitrov	29	(11)
(Bulgaria) Georgi Iliev	29	(1)
(Bulgaria) Krasimir Bezinski	29	(1)
(Bulgaria) Aleksandar Aleksandrov	10	(1)
(Bulgaria) Nikolay Boyanov	3	(0)
(Bulgaria) Dinko Dimitrov	20	(1)
(Bulgaria) Angel Kalburov	15	(1)
(Bulgaria) Metodi Tomanov	18	(0)

Midfielders
(Bulgaria) Plamen Markov	21	(5)
(Bulgaria) Radoslav Zdravkov	28	(7)
(Bulgaria) Nikola Velkov	19	(1)
(Bulgaria) Lyubomir Zhelev	1	(0)
(Bulgaria) Tsvetan Yonchev	29	(14)
(Bulgaria) Ruzhin Kerimov	25	(4)
(Bulgaria) Stefan Slavkov	1	(0)

Forwards
(Bulgaria) Spas Dzhevizov	27	(5)
(Bulgaria) Stoycho Mladenov	29	(18)
(Bulgaria) Mario Valkov	8	(2)
(Bulgaria) Alyosha Dimitrov	18	(2)
(Bulgaria) Dragomir Georgiev	2	(0)

Manager
(Bulgaria) Asparuh Nikodimov

== Top scorers ==
Rank	Scorer	Club	Goals
1	(Bulgaria) Mihail Valchev	Levski Sofia	24
2	(Bulgaria) Stoycho Mladenov	CSKA Sofia	18
3	(Bulgaria) Plamen Getov	Spartak Pleven	14
3	(Bulgaria) Tsvetan Yonchev	CSKA Sofia	14
5	(Bulgaria) Boycho Velichkov	Lokomotiv Sofia	13
6	(Bulgaria) Petar Kurdov	Levski Sofia	12
6	(Bulgaria) Todor Barzov	Levski Sofia	12
8	(Bulgaria) Georgi Dimitrov	CSKA Sofia	11
8	(Bulgaria) Kostadin Kostadinov	Botev Plovdiv	11
8	(Bulgaria) Mitko Argirov	Botev Plovdiv	11
8	(Bulgaria) Ivan Pritargov	Chernomorets Burgas	11
