= Stoycho =

Stoycho is a given name. Notable people with the name include:

- Stoycho Mladenov (born 1957), Bulgarian footballer
- Stoycho Mladenov, Jr. (born 1985), Bulgarian footballer
- Stoycho Nedkov (born 1986), Bulgarian footballer
- Stoycho Stoev (born 1962), Bulgarian footballer and manager
- Stoycho Stoilov (born 1971), Bulgarian footballer
- Stoycho Vassilev Breskovski (1934–2004), Bulgarian paleontologist
