= 1986–87 A Group =

43rd season of top-tier football league in Bulgaria

A Group
- Season: 1986–87
- Champions: CSKA Sofia (24th title)
- Relegated: Akademik Svishtov, Dimitrovgrad
- European Cup: CSKA Sofia
- UEFA Cup: Trakia Plovdiv; Lokomotiv Sofia
- Matches: 240
- Goals: 786 (3.28 per match)
- Top goalscorer: Nasko Sirakov (36 goals)

The 1986–87 A Group was the 39th season of the A Football Group, the top Bulgarian professional league for association football clubs, since its establishment in 1948.

== Overview ==
It was contested by 16 teams, and CSKA Sofia won the championship.

== Teams ==
=== Stadiums and locations ===
Locations of the 1986–87 Bulgarian A Group teams
Sofia 1986–87 A Group football clubs

Team	City	Stadium	Capacity
Akademik	Svishtov	Akademik	13,500
Beroe	Stara Zagora	Beroe	17,000
Chernomorets	Burgas	Deveti Septemvri	18,000
CSKA	Sofia	Narodna Armia	26,000
Dimitrovgrad	Dimitrovgrad	Rakovski	12,000
Etar	Veliko Tarnovo	Ivaylo	16,000
Levski	Sofia	Levski; Rakovski	40,000; 18,000
Lokomotiv	Plovdiv	Lokomotiv; Deveti Septemvri	13,000; 50,000
Lokomotiv	Sofia	Vasil Levski National Stadium	60,000
Pirin	Blagoevgrad	Hristo Botev (Blagoevgrad)	15,000
Slavia	Sofia	Slavia	25,000
Sliven	Sliven	Hadzhi Dimitar	15,000
Spartak	Varna	Spartak	12,000
Trakia	Plovdiv	Hristo Botev (Plovdiv)	30,000
Vratsa	Vratsa	Hristo Botev (Vratsa)	25,000

=== Personnel ===
Team	Manager	Captain
Akademik	(Bulgaria) Petko Petkov	(Bulgaria) Nikola Moskov
Beroe	(Bulgaria) Evgeni Yanchovski	(Bulgaria) Tenyo Minchev
Chernomorets	(Bulgaria) Lyubomir Borisov	(Bulgaria) Valentin Deliminkov
CSKA	(Bulgaria) Dimitar Penev	(Bulgaria) Lachezar Tanev
Dimitrovgrad	(Bulgaria) Grigor Petkov	(Bulgaria) Ivan Iliev
Etar	(Bulgaria) Georgi Vasilev	(Bulgaria) Stefan Lahchiev
Levski	(Bulgaria) Pavel Panov	(Bulgaria) Rusi Gochev
Lokomotiv Plovdiv	(Bulgaria) Hristo Bonev	(Bulgaria) Ayan Sadakov
Lokomotiv Sofia	(Bulgaria) Apostol Chachevski	(Bulgaria) Nako Doychev
Pirin	(Bulgaria) Boris Nikolov	(Bulgaria) Yordan Murlev
Slavia	(Bulgaria) Atanas Parzhelov	(Bulgaria) Ivan Haydarliev
Sliven	(Bulgaria) Lyudmil Goranov	(Bulgaria) Tenko Dobrev
Spartak Pleven	(Bulgaria) Ivan Vutsov	(Bulgaria) Plamen Getov
Spartak Varna	(Bulgaria) Ivan Filipov	(Bulgaria) Zhivko Gospodinov
Trakia	(Bulgaria) Ivan Gluhchev	(Bulgaria) Kostadin Kostadinov
Vratsa	(Bulgaria) Iliya Panev	(Bulgaria) Tsvetan Danov

== League standings ==
Pos	Team	Pld	W	D	0–0	L	GF	GA	GD	Pts	Qualification or relegation
1	CSKA Sofia (C)	30	21	5	0	4	73	30	+43	47	Qualification for European Cup first round
2	Levski Sofia	30	19	6	0	5	75	35	+40	44	Qualification for Cup Winners' Cup first round (Note: Levski Sofia qualified for Cup Winners' Cup as a finalists in the 1986–87 Bulgarian Cup.)
3	Trakia Plovdiv	30	16	7	0	7	57	30	+27	39	Qualification for UEFA Cup first round
4	Lokomotiv Sofia	30	14	7	1	8	67	45	+22	35	Qualification for UEFA Cup first round
5	Slavia Sofia	30	15	5	0	10	59	46	+13	35	
6	Lokomotiv Plovdiv	30	11	8	1	10	58	44	+14	30	
7	Etar Veliko Tarnovo	30	12	6	0	12	40	42	−2	30	
8	Vratsa	30	11	6	0	13	42	56	−14	28	
9	Sliven	30	11	5	0	14	52	52	0	27	
10	Spartak Varna	30	10	5	0	15	44	62	−18	25	
11	Pirin Blagoevgrad	30	8	8	2	12	35	47	−12	24	
12	Chernomorets Burgas	30	10	4	0	16	48	76	−28	24	
13	Beroe Stara Zagora	30	8	5	0	17	44	54	−10	21	
14	Spartak Pleven	30	7	7	2	14	31	50	−19	21	
15	Akademik Svishtov (R)	30	7	7	1	15	29	51	−22	21	Relegation to 1987–88 B Group
16	Dimitrovgrad (R)	30	8	5	1	16	32	66	−34	21	Relegation to 1987–88 B Group

Source: 1986-87 Football retro-football.bg
Rules for classification: 1) points; 2) goal difference; 3) number of goals scored.
(C) Champion; (R) Relegated

== Results ==
Home \ Away	ASV	BSZ	CHB	CSK	DIM	ETA	LEV	LPL	LSO	PIR	SLA	SLI	SPL	SPV	TRA	VRA
Akademik Svishtov		1–1	2–1	1–1	5–1	3–0	1–1	1–2	2–0	1–0	1–1	2–0	0–1	2–1	0–1	1–1
Beroe Stara Zagora	1–1		4–0	2–1	1–0	4–2	2–3	1–1	2–3	3–1	1–2	0–1	1–1	4–1	3–0	5–0
Chernomorets Burgas	2–0	2–1		0–2	4–1	1–1	0–2	2–2	1–3	4–1	2–4	3–2	7–1	1–0	3–2	2–1
CSKA Sofia	1–0	3–2	10–1		3–0	2–0	1–0	1–0	3–3	3–0	1–3	2–1	3–1	4–0	4–2	7–2
Dimitrovgrad	0–0	3–0	3–2	1–1		1–0	1–2	1–0	3–2	1–1	0–1	2–1	2–1	1–1	0–1	2–1
Etar Veliko Tarnovo	2–1	4–0	2–1	0–2	1–1		0–1	4–3	1–0	2–2	1–0	3–1	3–1	1–0	2–0	3–0
Levski Sofia	3–0	3–2	8–1	0–1	4–1	3–0		4–2	2–1	3–0	2–2	4–2	3–1	7–3	1–1	7–1
Lokomotiv Plovdiv	1–1	2–1	1–2	2–1	7–0	3–2	2–0		2–1	1–1	2–0	4–0	1–1	7–1	1–2	2–0
Lokomotiv Sofia	4–0	2–1	1–1	3–3	5–0	3–0	4–2	1–1		2–0	5–1	2–1	0–0	3–1	2–1	5–1
Pirin Blagoevgrad	4–1	2–0	2–0	1–1	2–2	0–1	1–3	0–0	2–1		1–0	1–1	0–0	2–0	2–2	3–3
Slavia Sofia	4–0	5–0	4–3	2–3	4–1	2–1	0–2	4–3	2–2	3–1		4–1	3–1	2–1	0–2	2–0
Sliven	2–1	2–2	1–0	1–2	5–1	2–0	1–1	2–1	5–1	2–3	2–2		4–2	5–2	1–3	3–0
Spartak Pleven	3–1	1–0	3–0	0–3	1–0	1–1	2–2	1–1	1–3	0–1	1–1	1–2		1–2	1–1	2–0
Spartak Varna	6–0	2–0	1–1	1–2	3–1	2–1	1–1	5–2	2–1	1–0	2–1	1–1	1–0		0–2	2–2
Trakia Plovdiv	4–0	2–0	4–0	1–0	4–1	1–1	0–1	2–2	1–1	5–1	2–0	1–0	4–0	5–1		1–1
Vratsa	2–0	3–0	7–1	0–2	3–1	1–1	1–0	2–0	3–3	1–0	2–0	1–0	0–1	2–0	1–0	

Source: A PFG (in Bulgarian)
Legend: Blue = home team win; Yellow = draw; Red = away team win.

== Champions ==
CSKA Sofia

Goalkeepers
(Bulgaria) Georgi Velinov	30	(0)
(Bulgaria) Krasimir Dosev	3	(0)
(Bulgaria) Yordan Filipov	1	(0)

Defenders
(Bulgaria) Nedyalko Mladenov	26	(0)
(Bulgaria) Angel Chervenkov	18	(1)
(Bulgaria) Krasimir Bezinski	30	(2)
(Bulgaria) Aleksandar Aleksandrov	24	(1)
(Bulgaria) Kiril Kachamanov	1	(0)
(Bulgaria) Iliya Dyakov	5	(0)
(Bulgaria) Sasho Borisov	30	(0)
(Bulgaria) Valeri Damyanov	4	(0)
(Bulgaria) Aydan Ilyazov	20	(0)

Midfielders
(Bulgaria) Stoil Stefanov	1	(0)
(Bulgaria) Kostadin Yanchev	22	(0)
(Bulgaria) Ivaylo Kirov	26	(6)
(Bulgaria) Lyubomir Zhelev	4	(0)
(Bulgaria) Lachezar Tanev	29	(28)
(Bulgaria) Lyubomir Lyubenov	2	(0)

Forwards
(Bulgaria) Hristo Stoichkov	25	(6)
(Bulgaria) Emil Kostadinov	26	(3)
(Bulgaria) Ivaylo Kotev	1	(1)
(Bulgaria) Lyuboslav Penev	27	(19)
(Bulgaria) Yordan Dimitrov	17	(6)
(Bulgaria) Rumen Stoyanov	3	(0)

Manager
(Bulgaria) Dimitar Penev

== Top scorers ==
Rank	Scorer	Club	Goals
1	(Bulgaria) Nasko Sirakov	Levski Sofia	36
2	(Bulgaria) Petar Aleksandrov	Slavia Sofia	33
3	(Bulgaria) Lachezar Tanev	CSKA Sofia	28
4	(Bulgaria) Lyuboslav Penev	CSKA Sofia	19
5	(Bulgaria) Stoycho Stoev	Lokomotiv Sofia	18
6	(Bulgaria) Hristo Kolev	Lokomotiv Plovdiv	16
7	(Bulgaria) Petar Mihtarski	Pirin Blagoevgrad	15
8	(Bulgaria) Nikolay Rusev	Chernomorets Burgas	13
8	(Bulgaria) Iliya Voynov	Vratsa	13
8	(Bulgaria) Mitko Argirov	Etar Veliko Tarnovo	13
8	(Bulgaria) Aleksandar Bonchev	Lokomotiv Sofia	13

== Awards ==
=== Team of the Season ===
Team of the Season (by newspaper Naroden Sport)
Goalkeeper	(Bulgaria) Georgi Velinov (CSKA)			
Defence	(Bulgaria) Yancho Bogomilov (Spartak Varna)	(Bulgaria) Nikolay Iliev (Levski)	(Bulgaria) Stefan Lahchiev (Etar)	(Bulgaria) Krasimir Bezinski (CSKA)
Midfield	(Bulgaria) Nasko Sirakov (Levski)		(Bulgaria) Nikolay Rusev (Chernomorets)	(Bulgaria) Hristo Stoichkov (CSKA)
Attack	(Bulgaria) Lachezar Tanev (CSKA)		(Bulgaria) Petar Aleksandrov (Slavia)	(Bulgaria) Iliya Voynov (Vratsa)

== Attendances ==
#	Club	Average
1	Levski	12,750
2	CSKA Sofia	12,000
3	Lokomotiv Plovdiv	11,733
4	Trakia	9,733
5	Beroe	9,467
6	Pleven	9,267
7	Sliven	8,667
8	Pirin	8,567
9	Dimitrovgrad	7,840
10	Chernomorets	7,833
11	Slavia Sofia	7,800
12	Etar	7,733
13	Varna	7,667
14	Svishtov	7,133
15	Botev	5,660
16	Lokomotiv Sofia	5,627
