= 1985 Soviet Army Cup final =

1985 Cup of the Soviet Army final
CSKA Sofia	Cherno More Varna
A Group	A Group
4	0
- Date: 9 May 1985
- Venue: Vasil Levski National Stadium, Sofia
- Referee: Ivan Yosifov
- Attendance: 15,000

The 1985 Cup of the Soviet Army final was the 3rd final of the Cup of the Soviet Army (as a secondary cup tournament in Bulgaria), and was contested between CSKA Sofia and Cherno More Varna on 1 June 1983 at Vasil Levski National Stadium in Sofia. CSKA won the final 4–0.

== Match ==
=== Details ===
9 May 1985

CSKA Sofia	4−0	Cherno More Varna
Tanev 16'; Slavkov 18', 59'; Mladenov 58'

Vasil Levski National Stadium, Sofia
Attendance: 15,000
Referee: Ivan Yosifov

CSKA	Cherno More

GK	1	(Bulgaria) Krasimir Dosev
DF	2	(Bulgaria) Nedyalko Mladenov	(substituted off) 78'
DF	3	(Bulgaria) Angel Chervenkov
DF	4	(Bulgaria) Vasil Tinchev
DF	5	(Bulgaria) Georgi Dimitrov
MF	6	(Bulgaria) Radoslav Zdravkov
MF	7	(Bulgaria) Iliya Voynov
FW	8	(Bulgaria) Georgi Slavkov	(substituted off) 74'
FW	9	(Bulgaria) Lachezar Tanev
FW	10	(Bulgaria) Kostadin Yanchev
MF	11	(Bulgaria) Stoycho Mladenov
Substitutes:
FW	--	(Bulgaria) Hristo Stoichkov	(substituted in) 74'
DF	--	(Bulgaria) Krasimir Bezinski	(substituted in) 78'
Manager:
(Bulgaria) Manol Manolov

GK	1	(Bulgaria) Georgi Popov
DF	2	(Bulgaria) Svetozar Svetozarov
DF	3	(Bulgaria) Todor Marev
DF	4	(Bulgaria) Yuliyan Hristov
DF	5	(Bulgaria) Krasimir Diamandiev	(substituted off) 58'
MF	6	(Bulgaria) Todor Atanasov
FW	7	(Bulgaria) Plamen Ganev	(substituted off) 66'
MF	8	(Bulgaria) Milen Bakardzhiev
FW	9	(Bulgaria) Nikola Spasov
FW	10	(Bulgaria) Rafi Rafiev
MF	11	(Bulgaria) Yuliyan Spasov
Substitutes:
DF	--	(Bulgaria) Valeri Karov	(substituted in) 58'
FW	--	(Bulgaria) Mario Valkov	(substituted in) 66'
Manager:
(Bulgaria) Todor Velikov
