= List of PFC Litex Lovech managers =

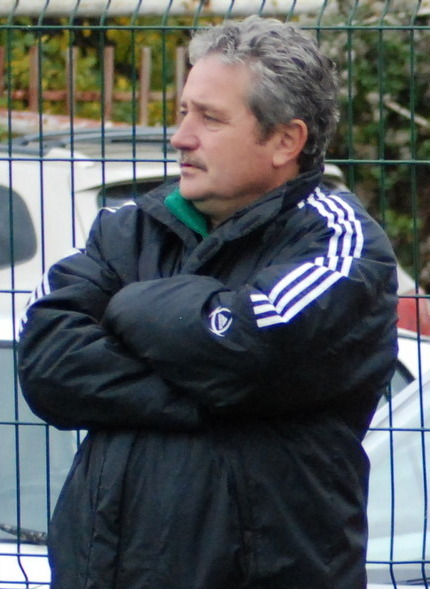
Ferario Spasov, during his fourth spell as manager of Litex

The following is a list of managers of Bulgarian side Litex Lovech.

== Managerial history ==
Name	Nationality	From	To	Honours
Boris Angelov	Bulgaria	June 1992	May 1993	–
Georgi Denev	Bulgaria	June 1993	May 1994	–
Radoslav Zdravkov	Bulgaria	May 1994	May 1996	–
Ferario Spasov	Bulgaria	May 1996	May 1997	1 B PFG title
Dragoljub Bekvalac	Serbia and Montenegro	May 1997	Aug 1997	–
Dimitar Dimitrov	Bulgaria	Sept 1997	Aug 1998	1 A PFG title
Ferario Spasov	Bulgaria	Sept 1998	June 1999	1 A PFG title
Dimitar Dimitrov	Bulgaria	June 1999	Dec 1999	–
Čedomir Đoinčević	Serbia and Montenegro	Dec 1999	May 2000	–
Mihai Stoichiţă	Romania	June 2000	Nov 2000	–
Ferario Spasov	Bulgaria	Nov 2000	May 2003	1 Bulgarian Cup
Dragoljub Simonović	Serbia and Montenegro	June 2003	Feb 2004	–
Ljupko Petrović	Serbia and Montenegro	Feb 2004	May 2004	1 Bulgarian Cup
Stoycho Mladenov	Bulgaria	May 2004	Dec 2005	–
Itzhak Shum	Israel	Jan 2005	May 2005	–
Ljupko Petrović	Serbia	June 2005	May 2007	–
Ferario Spasov	Bulgaria	June 2007	Nov 2007	–
Miodrag Ješić	Serbia	6 Nov 2007	May 2008	1 Bulgarian Cup
Stanimir Stoilov	Bulgaria	June 2008	29 Aug 2009	1 Bulgarian Cup
Angel Chervenkov	Bulgaria	29 Aug 2009	5 Aug 2010	1 A PFG title
Petko Petkov*	Bulgaria	5 Aug 2010	2 Sept 2010	1 Bulgarian Supercup
Lyuboslav Penev	Bulgaria	2 Sept 2010	23 Oct 2011	1 A PFG title
Atanas Dzhambazki	Bulgaria	23 Oct 2011	5 Jan 2012	–
Hristo Stoichkov	Bulgaria	5 Jan 2012	5 June 2013	–
Zlatomir Zagorčić	Bulgaria	1 July 2013	31 March 2014	–
Miodrag Ješić	Serbia	31 March 2014	25 May 2014	–
Krasimir Balakov	Bulgaria	26 May 2014	10 July 2015	–
Ljupko Petrović*	Serbia	10 July 2015	5 August 2015	–
Laurențiu Reghecampf	Romania	5 August 2015	3 December 2015	–

Key
* Served as caretaker manager.

Updated 31 May 2013.
