= 1980–81 A Group =

37th season of top-tier football league in Bulgaria

A Group
- Season: 1980–81
- Champions: CSKA Sofia (21st title)
- Relegated: Minyor, Pirin
- European Cup: CSKA Sofia
- UEFA Cup: Levski Sofia; Akademik Sofia
- Matches played: 240
- Goals scored: 657 (2.74 per match)
- Top goalscorer: Georgi Slavkov (31 goals)

The 1980–81 A Group was the 33rd season of the A Football Group, the top Bulgarian professional league for association football clubs, since its establishment in 1948.

== Overview ==
It was contested by 16 teams, and CSKA Sofia won the championship.

== League standings ==
Pos	Team	Pld	W	D	L	GF	GA	GD	Pts	Qualification or relegation
1	CSKA Sofia (C)	30	14	12	4	70	32	+38	40	Qualification for European Cup first round
2	Levski Sofia	30	13	10	7	44	25	+19	36	Qualification for UEFA Cup first round
3	Trakia Plovdiv	30	15	5	10	64	40	+24	35	Qualification for Cup Winners' Cup first round
4	Akademik Sofia	30	13	8	9	42	40	+2	34	Qualification for UEFA Cup first round
5	Spartak Pleven	30	12	7	11	38	41	−3	31	
6	Cherno More Varna	30	8	13	9	36	37	−1	29	
7	Slavia Sofia	30	10	9	11	35	44	−9	29	
8	Marek Dupnitsa	30	12	4	14	39	40	−1	28	
9	Lokomotiv Sofia	30	8	12	10	34	35	−1	28	
10	Beroe Stara Zagora	30	11	6	13	45	49	−4	28	
11	Chernomorets Burgas	30	9	10	11	42	49	−7	28	
12	Botev Vratsa	30	8	11	11	32	37	−5	27	
13	Belasitsa Petrich	30	11	5	14	38	47	−9	27	
14	Sliven	30	11	5	14	33	43	−10	27	
15	Minyor Pernik (R)	30	12	3	15	32	51	−19	27	Relegation to 1981–82 B Group
16	Pirin Blagoevgrad (R)	30	6	14	10	33	47	−14	26	Relegation to 1981–82 B Group

Source: rsssf.com
(C) Champions; (R) Relegated

== Results ==
Home \ Away	AKD	BEL	BSZ	BVR	CHM	CHB	CSK	LEV	LSO	MAR	MIN	PIR	SLA	SLI	SPL	TRA
Akademik Sofia		2–1	3–2	1–0	4–1	3–1	1–2	1–0	2–2	2–1	3–1	1–0	1–1	2–1	3–1	1–1
Belasitsa Petrich	2–0		3–0	3–3	2–0	0–0	0–0	2–1	3–1	2–1	2–0	2–2	3–0	2–0	1–0	1–0
Beroe Stara Zagora	0–2	4–2		4–1	2–2	4–0	2–1	2–0	0–0	4–1	2–1	2–2	3–1	0–0	4–1	2–1
Botev Vratsa	0–2	2–1	2–1		0–0	2–2	0–0	2–2	0–0	2–0	3–0	1–1	3–0	0–0	1–1	2–1
Cherno More	0–0	2–0	4–1	2–1		1–1	1–1	1–1	0–0	3–0	2–1	1–1	0–0	0–1	2–0	2–1
Chernomorets Burgas	2–2	2–1	3–1	1–1	0–0		2–2	3–2	2–1	0–3	2–0	2–0	1–0	3–3	5–0	1–2
CSKA Sofia	2–2	4–2	7–0	3–0	3–1	4–0		2–2	0–2	5–0	5–0	3–0	1–1	3–0	4–0	4–2
Levski Sofia	3–1	1–0	2–0	1–0	0–0	2–0	2–0		1–1	2–0	2–1	7–1	2–0	2–0	1–1	3–1
Lokomotiv Sofia	0–0	5–1	1–1	3–1	0–0	3–1	2–3	0–0		2–1	0–2	3–1	2–2	1–0	0–0	0–1
Marek Dupnitsa	1–0	5–1	0–0	0–1	2–1	1–0	0–0	1–1	2–1		3–0	2–0	4–2	2–0	3–0	5–3
Minyor Pernik	1–0	1–0	2–1	1–3	2–1	3–1	3–3	2–1	1–0	2–0		1–1	1–0	2–1	0–2	2–1
Pirin Blagoevgrad	2–2	0–0	2–0	3–1	2–2	1–1	1–1	0–3	2–0	1–0	4–0		3–3	1–0	0–0	0–0
Slavia Sofia	2–0	3–0	2–1	1–0	3–2	3–2	0–0	1–0	2–2	1–0	1–1	3–1		0–1	1–0	2–2
Sliven	1–0	1–0	0–2	2–0	2–4	1–2	1–3	0–0	2–1	0–0	1–0	4–0	3–0		4–3	2–1
Spartak Pleven	4–0	2–0	1–0	1–0	3–1	2–1	2–2	0–0	0–1	1–0	3–0	1–1	1–0	3–1		2–1
Trakia Plovdiv	5–1	5–1	2–0	0–0	3–0	1–1	3–2	2–0	4–0	3–1	3–1	1–0	4–0	6–1	4–3	

Source: A PFG (in Bulgarian)
Legend: Blue = home team win; Yellow = draw; Red = away team win.

== Champions ==
CSKA Sofia

Goalkeepers
(Bulgaria) Georgi Velinov	27	(0)
(Bulgaria) Todor Arsov	3	(0)

Defenders
(Bulgaria) Georgi Dimitrov	25	(4)
(Bulgaria) Georgi Iliev	27	(2)
(Bulgaria) Tsonyo Vasilev	19	(2)
(Bulgaria) Angel Rangelov	22	(1)
(Bulgaria) Vasil Tinchev	4	(0)
(Bulgaria) Ivan Zafirov	15	(0)
(Bulgaria) Dinko Dimitrov	22	(1)
(Bulgaria) Angel Kalburov	19	(0)

Midfielders
(Bulgaria) Plamen Markov	26	(7)
(Bulgaria) Radoslav Zdravkov	21	(10)
(Bulgaria) Metodi Tomanov	4	(0)
(Bulgaria) Nikola Velkov	28	(4)
(Bulgaria) Tsvetan Yonchev	26	(8)
(Bulgaria) Ruzhin Kerimov	26	(2)

Forwards
(Bulgaria) Spas Dzhevizov	30	(17)
(Bulgaria) Stoycho Mladenov	16	(9)
(Bulgaria) Mario Valkov	17	(1)

Manager
(Bulgaria) Asparuh Nikodimov

== Top scorers ==
Rank	Scorer	Club	Goals
1	(Bulgaria) Georgi Slavkov	Trakia Plovdiv	31
2	(Bulgaria) Spas Dzhevizov	CSKA Sofia	17
3	(Bulgaria) Alyosha Dimitrov	Akademik Sofia	16
4	(Bulgaria) Andrey Zhelyazkov	Slavia Sofia	13
4	(Bulgaria) Kostadin Kostadinov	Trakia Plovdiv	13
6	(Bulgaria) Mihail Valchev	Akademik Sofia	12
7	(Bulgaria) Atanas Mihaylov	Lokomotiv Sofia	11
7	(Bulgaria) Georgi Stoyanov	Beroe Stara Zagora	11
7	(Bulgaria) Plamen Getov	Spartak Pleven	11
7	(Bulgaria) Ventsislav Petrov	Marek Dupnitsa	11
7	(Bulgaria) Chavdar Tsvetkov	Slavia Sofia	11
