= Ruzhin Kerimov =

Bulgarian footballer

Personal information
- Full name: Ruzhin Ivanov Kerimov
- Date of birth: 15 July 1956 (age 70)
- Place of birth: Plovdiv, Bulgaria
- Height: 1.75 m (5 ft 9 in)
- Position: Midfielder

Youth career
- 1965–1974: Lokomotiv Plovdiv

Senior career*
Years	Team	Apps	(Gls)
1974–1980	Lokomotiv Plovdiv	94	(24)
1980–1986	CSKA Sofia	121	(14)
1986–1987	Altay	?	(?)
1988–1989	Varzim	26	(7)
1989–1990	S.C. Covilhã	21	(2)
1990–1991	Lusitano Évora	25	(6)

International career
1978–1982	Bulgaria	6	(1)
- * Club domestic league appearances and goals

Ruzhin Ivanov Kerimov (Bulgarian: Ружин Керимов; also known as Ruzhdi Kerimov Bulgarian: Ружди Керимов; born 15 July 1956) is a retired Bulgarian footballer who played as a midfielder.

== Football career ==
Born in Plovdiv, Kerimov started playing football for hometown club Lokomotiv Plovdiv. In 1980, he joined CSKA Sofia, where he would enjoy his greatest successes, winning three consecutive national championships and adding two Bulgarian Cups; in the first round of the 1980–81 European Cup, he scored against Nottingham Forest in a 1–0 away win (2–0 on aggregate), as the capital club eventually reached the quarterfinals.

In 1986, aged 30, Kerimov moved abroad, playing for Altay S.K. in Turkey (helping to the eighth position in the Süper Lig). He made six appearances for the Bulgaria national team, his debut arriving in 1978.

== Honours ==
CSKA Sofia

- Bulgarian A Group (3): 1980–81, 1981–82, 1982–83
- Bulgarian Cup (2): 1983, 1985
