= Nedkov =

Nedkov (Bulgarian: Недков) is a Bulgarian masculine surname, its feminine counterpart is Nedkova. It may refer to

- Iliyan Nedkov (born 1958), Bulgarian judoka
- Stanislav Nedkov (born 1981), Bulgarian mixed martial arts fighter
- Stoycho Nedkov (born 1986), Bulgarian footballer
