= Lyuboslav Penev =

Bulgarian footballer and manager (born 1966)

- Penev in 2026

Personal information
- Full name: Lyuboslav Mladenov Penev
- Date of birth: 31 August 1966 (age 60)
- Place of birth: Dobrich, Bulgaria
- Height: 1.93 m (6 ft 4 in)
- Position: Forward

Youth career
- –1984: CSKA Sofia

Senior career*
Years	Team	Apps	(Gls)
1984–1989	CSKA Sofia	101	(80)
1989–1995	Valencia	167	(67)
1995–1996	Atlético Madrid	37	(16)
1996–1998	Compostela	69	(32)
1998–1999	Celta Vigo	32	(14)
2001–2002	CSKA Sofia	22	(8)
2002	Lokomotiv Plovdiv	4	(0)
Total		432	(217)

International career
1987–1998	Bulgaria	62	(14)

Managerial career
- 2009–2010: CSKA Sofia
- 2010–2011: Litex Lovech
- 2011–2014: Bulgaria
- 2014: Botev Plovdiv
- 2015: CSKA Sofia
- 2016: Litex Lovech
- 2016: Litex Lovech II
- 2017: Valencia B
- 2019: CSKA Sofia
- 2020–2021: Tsarsko Selo
- 2021: CSKA Sofia
- 2021: Tsarsko Selo
- 2022: CSKA 1948
- 2023–2024: Hebar Pazardzhik
- 2024: Lokomotiv Plovdiv
- 2026: Lokomotiv Sofia
- * Club domestic league appearances and goals

Lyuboslav Mladenov Penev (Bulgarian: Любослав Младенов Пенев; born 31 August 1966) is a Bulgarian professional football manager and former player.

Penev played as a forward for several clubs in Bulgaria and Spain. He started his career at CSKA Sofia in 1984, winning two Bulgarian League titles and four Bulgarian Cups. In 1989 he moved to Valencia, where he established himself as among the most prolific goalscorers in La Liga. After six seasons at Valencia, Penev joined Atlético Madrid, winning the 1995–96 La Liga. After leaving Atlético, he had stints with Compostela, Celta Vigo, CSKA and Lokomotiv Plovdiv.

== Club career ==
Penev's first professional team was CSKA Sofia of the Bulgarian capital. He made his first team debut in 1984, when he was only 18 years old. CSKA of the late 1980s was the football "alma mater" to several Bulgarian players like Hristo Stoichkov who made it to the international team in the 1990s. During those days Lubo's teammates included defender Trifon Ivanov, winger Emil Kostadinov, and striker Hristo Stoichkov. With CSKA, Penev won the Bulgarian A Football Group twice (in 1987 and 1989) and the Bulgarian Cup three times (in 1987, 1988 and 1989). He was also voted Bulgarian Footballer of the Year in 1988.

In 1989, after reaching stardom in Bulgarian football, he took an important step in his career by moving to La Liga. In Primera, Penev played for four clubs: Valencia CF, Atlético Madrid, SD Compostela and Celta Vigo. The highlight of the Spanish years was the 1995–1996 season with Atlético, when the club won both the league championship and the Spanish Cup. Penev was the most efficient player of the "double squad" by scoring 22 goals in 44 games (including both league and cup matches).

== International career ==
Penev made his debut for the Bulgaria national team on 20 May 1987, playing as a starter in the 3–0 home win over Luxembourg in a Euro 1988 qualifier, before being substituted by Petar Aleksandrov during the second half.

He represented Bulgaria in 1996 European Football Championship in England and in the 1998 World Cup in France. He could not take part in the 1994 World Cup, as he had been diagnosed with testicular cancer at the beginning of 1994. For the same reason he was replaced by Nasko Sirakov during the match Bulgaria vs Romania at UEFA Euro 1996 in England.

== Coaching career ==
In March 2009, he succeeded his uncle Dimitar Penev as manager of CSKA Sofia and under his guidance the team qualified for the group stages of the UEFA Europa League, defeating Dynamo Moscow – 2–1 on aggregate. On 6 November 2009, he gave his resignation, after a 3–1 loss to Swiss side FC Basel due to a conflict with the club's owners. CSKA finished 4th in the group behind Roma, Basel and Fulham. CSKA won its single point in the opening game against the future finalist Fulham (1–1 after a good strike from Michel Platini and a mistake from CSKA goalkeeper Ivan Karadzhov). However, Penev's resignation was not accepted, because the CSKA fans wanted him to stay.

The club was leader in the Bulgarian championship before the last round, when Litex Lovech took the leadership. On 13 January 2010, after another clash with the owners, he was fired. After the lost game against Minyor Pernik he withdrew nine players from training sessions for breaking the club's rules, this led to the conflict with the owners.

During the summer many rumours connected him with a transfer to a Spanish clubs (mainly from Liga Adelante, but from Liga BBVA sides too), but he remained a free agent. On 2 September 2010, he became manager of Litex Lovech and won the 2010–11 A PFG Group championship.

On 23 October 2011, he resigned as Litex Lovech coach and was appointed manager of the national team. In his first game in charge, on 29 February 2012, Bulgaria earned a 1–1 draw away to Hungary. On 26 May 2012, his team defeated the runners-up of the 2010 FIFA World Cup Netherlands in Amsterdam by a score of 2–1. Under his management, Bulgaria's fortunes picked up and the team put in credible performances against Italy, Denmark and the Czech Republic in the qualifications for the 2014 FIFA World Cup. As a result, Bulgaria climbed from 96th in the FIFA World rankings when Penev took over, to 40th in November 2012. At one point Bulgaria stood second in Group B on 13 points. Their next game was against the Czech Republic in Sofia on 15 October 2013, a match which Bulgaria lost 1–0.

On 1 November 2013, Lyuboslav Penev extended his contract with the national team of Bulgaria for two years. During this period, he would attempt to qualify the team for the UEFA Euro 2016 in France.

On 6 June 2014, Penev was unveiled as the new manager of Botev Plovdiv, emphasising that his new duties would not in any way affect his commitment to the national team. The sudden financial troubles of the club, however, led to the quick termination of his contract in early July after only one game (4–0 home victory against Libertas at the first qualifying round for UEFA Europa League).

On 8 July 2014, Penev left Botev Plovdiv after just one game to focus on the Bulgaria national team.

On 20 November 2014, Penev was sacked by Bulgaria national team following a run of poor results that culminated in a frustrating 1–1 home draw with Malta.

In late April 2015, Penev took over as coach of former club CSKA Sofia until the end of the season, replacing Galin Ivanov after the club had found itself in a difficult situation due to a string of unsuccessful performances that had started at the beginning of 2015. On 22 January 2016 it was announced that he is going to manage Litex Lovech for a second time. The team was lately expelled from A Group, but had matches for the Bulgarian Cup until end of the season. In late September 2016, national team coach Ivaylo Petev agreed to a managerial contract with Dinamo Zagreb and therefore resigned. Many of the top national team players have spoken out in favour of Penev being reappointed as a national team coach - this is due to his tough and successful coaching. Many players such as Stanislav Manolev (who was, however, released from CSKA Sofia in 2019 while Penev was the manager) have stated that Bulgaria has been at their best in many recent years under coach Penev, as he is tough and very tactically mindful of the game and knows exactly what to do to bring the Bulgarian national team back to its original status as a side competitive with the European powerhouses in football. He was appointed as manager of CSKA Sofia for a third time on 8 February 2019, but resigned in early May due to disagreements with the club's board. On 30 April 2020, Penev took over as head coach of Tsarsko Selo Sofia. He managed to secure the team's place in the top flight of Bulgarian football.

On 28 May 2022, he was officially announced as the new manager of CSKA 1948. Despite having a successful season, with CSKA 1948 reaching third place in the league table and managing a streak of 10 consecutive matches without defeat, on 9 December 2022, Penev resigned from his position, citing as the reason the change in the club's approach to the management of the sports-technical aspects. In March 2023, he took over as head coach of relegation-threatened Hebar Pazardzhik, with the aim of securing the club's place in the top flight of Bulgarian football. Hebar achieved this task on 5 June 2023, following a 3–1 win over Beroe Stara Zagora.

== Career statistics ==
Scores and results list Bulgaria's goal tally first, score column indicates score after each Penev goal.

List of international goals scored by Lyuboslav Penev
No.	Date	Venue	Opponent	Score	Result	Competition
1	23 March 1988	Vasil Levski National Stadium, Sofia, Bulgaria	Czechoslovakia	2–0	2–0	Friendly match
2	24 May 1988	De Kuip, Rotterdam, Netherlands	Netherlands	2–1	2–1	Friendly match
3	7 August 1988	Laugardalsvöllur, Reykjavík, Iceland	Iceland	2–2	3–2	Friendly match
4	24 August 1988	Hetman Stadium, Białystok, Poland	Poland	2–3	2–3	Friendly match
5	21 September 1988	Vasil Levski National Stadium, Sofia, Bulgaria	Soviet Union	1–1	2–2	Friendly match
6	22 May 1991	Stadio Olimpico, Serravalle, San Marino	San Marino	3–0	3–0	Euro 1992 qualification
7	16 October 1991	Balgarska Armia Stadium, Sofia, Bulgaria	San Marino	1–0	4–0	Euro 1992 qualification
8	2 December 1992	Ramat Gan Stadium, Ramat Gan, Israel	Israel	2–0	2–0	1994 World Cup qualification
9.	13 October 1993	Vasil Levski National Stadium, Sofia, Bulgaria	Austria	1–0	4–1	1994 World Cup qualification
10	13 October 1993	Vasil Levski National Stadium, Sofia, Bulgaria	Austria	3–1	4–1	1994 World Cup qualification
11.	29 March 1995	Vasil Levski National Stadium, Sofia, Bulgaria	Wales	2–0	3–1	Euro 1996 qualification
12	29 March 1995	Vasil Levski National Stadium, Sofia, Bulgaria	Wales	3–0	3–1	Euro 1996 qualification
13	20 August 1997	Vasil Levski National Stadium, Sofia, Bulgaria	Israel	1–0	1–0	1998 World Cup qualification
14	22 April 1998	Vasil Levski National Stadium, Sofia, Bulgaria	Morocco	1–0	2–1	Friendly match

== Managerial statistics ==
As of 6 October 2024

Team	From	To	Record							
Team	From	To	G	W	D	L	Win %	GF	GA	GD
CSKA Sofia	6 March 2009	13 January 2010	30	21	4	5	70.00	52	18	+34
Litex Lovech	2 September 2010	24 October 2011	41	28	7	6	68.29	76	26	+50
Bulgaria	1 November 2011	20 November 2014	23	8	7	8	34.78	28	24	+4
CSKA Sofia	28 April 2015	30 June 2015	5	1	3	1	20.00	6	5	+1
Litex Lovech	22 January 2016	6 June 2016	2	1	0	1	50.00	1	2	-1
Litex Lovech II	22 January 2016	6 June 2016	13	10	3	0	76.92	32	8	+24
CSKA Sofia	8 February 2019	3 May 2019	14	7	3	4	50.00	22	13	+9
Tsarsko Selo	30 April 2020	28 March 2021	39	12	9	18	30.77	37	47	-10
CSKA Sofia	28 March 2021	26 July 2021	15	8	3	4	53.33	25	15	+10
CSKA 1948 Sofia	30 May 2022	9 December 2022	20	12	6	2	60.00	34	13	+21
Hebar Pazardzhik	21 March 2023	4 June 2024	51	17	8	26	33.33	57	75	-18
Lokomotiv Plovdiv	14 June 2024	11 October 2024	10	2	3	5	20.00	12	17	-5
Total			263	125	56	82	47.53	382	263	+119

== Honours ==
=== As a player ===
CSKA Sofia

- Bulgarian League: 1986–87, 1988–89
- Bulgarian Cup: 1984–85, 1986–87, 1987–88, 1988–89
- Cup of the Soviet Army: 1984-85, 1985-86, 1988-89
- Bulgarian Super Cup: 1989

Atlético Madrid

- La Liga: 1995–96
- Copa del Rey: 1995–96

Individual

- Bulgarian Footballer of the Year: 1988

=== As a manager ===
Litex Lovech

- Bulgarian First League: 2010–11

CSKA Sofia

- Bulgarian Cup: 2020-21
