= Metodi Tomanov =

Bulgarian footballer and manager

Personal information
- Full name: Metodi Petrov Tomanov
- Date of birth: 29 July 1959 (age 67)
- Place of birth: Ognyanovo, Bulgaria
- Position: Midfielder

Senior career*
Years	Team	Apps	(Gls)
1977–1979	Benkovski Pazardzhik		
1979–1982	CSKA Sofia	27	(0)
1982–1984	Sliven	52	(0)
1984–1986	CSKA Sofia	26	(1)
1987–1988	Spartak Pleven	28	(3)
1988–1989	Minyor Pernik		
1989–1990	Atlético CP	14	(1)
1990–1991	Timok		
1991–1992	Radnički Niš	3	(0)
1992	Yu Kong		

International career
1981–1986	Bulgaria	4	(0)

Managerial career
- 1993–1998: Verila
- 1998–1999: Bulgaria U21 (assistant)
- 2000–2001: Bulgaria (assistant)
- 2002–2004: CSKA Sofia (assistant)
- 2005–2006: Spartak Varna (assistant)
- 2007–2008: Beroe Stara Zagora (assistant)
- 2008–2011: CSKA Sofia (scout)
- 2011–2014: Ludogorets Razgrad (scout)
- 2014–2018: Ludogorets Razgrad (sports director)
- 2021–2022: CSKA 1948 (scout)
- 2022: CSKA 1948 (scout)
- 2024–: CSKA Sofia (scout)
- * Club domestic league appearances and goals

Metodi Petrov Tomanov (Bulgarian: Методи Петров Томанов; born 29 July 1959) is a Bulgarian former international football player and current manager.

== Playing career ==
Tomanov's most successful period, while a player, was when he won three Bulgarian national championships and two national cups, all with CSKA Sofia. In that period he played four times for the Bulgaria national team. After leaving CSKA, he played few years more in Bulgaria before emigrating to Portugal and Yugoslavia, where he represented Atlético and Radnički Niš, respectively. He came to Radnički Niš after a spell with FK Timok. Soon after retiring, he began his coaching career.

Following his retirement as an active player, he began his coaching career after obtaining a UEFA A License.

== Director career ==
On 15 March 2014, Tomanov became sport director of PFC Ludogorets Razgrad.

== Honours ==
CSKA Sofia

- 3 times Bulgarian First League Champion: 1979-80, 1980-81 and 1981-82
- 2 times Bulgarian Cup winner: 1981 and 1985
- 1 time Cup Of the Soviet Army winner: 1985
