= Georgi Dimitrov (footballer, born 1959) =

Bulgarian footballer (1959–2021)

Personal information
- Full name: Georgi Georgiev Dimitrov
- Date of birth: 14 January 1959
- Place of birth: Stara Zagora, Bulgaria
- Date of death: 8 May 2021 (aged 62)
- Height: 1.87 m (6 ft 2 in)
- Position: Centre-back

Senior career*
Years	Team	Apps	(Gls)
1976–1977	Beroe Stara Zagora	27	(1)
1977–1986	CSKA Sofia	222	(19)
1986–1988	Saint-Étienne	54	(3)
1988–1989	CSKA Sofia	22	(2)
1989–1990	Slavia Sofia	16	(0)
Total		341	(25)

International career
1978–1988	Bulgaria	77	(7)

Managerial career
- 2003: Marek Dupnitsa
- 2006–2007: Velbazhd Kyustendil
- 2007–2008: Marek Dupnitsa
- * Club domestic league appearances and goals

Georgi Georgiev Dimitrov (Bulgarian: Георги Георгиeв Димитров; 14 January 1959 – 8 May 2021) was a Bulgarian professional footballer who played as a centre-back.

Dimitrov represented Bulgaria on 77 occasions between 1978 and 1988, scoring 7 goals. He captained his country 56 times including at the 1986 FIFA World Cup.

== Honours ==
=== Club ===
CSKA Sofia

- A Group: 1979–80, 1980–81, 1981–82, 1982–83, 1988–89
- Bulgarian Cup: 1983, 1985, 1989
- Cup of the Soviet Army: 1985, 1986, 1989

=== Individual ===
- Bulgarian Footballer of the Year: 1985
