= Angel Kalburov =

Bulgarian footballer

Personal information
- Date of birth: 13 March 1955
- Place of birth: Dimitrovgrad, Bulgaria
- Date of death: 8 May 2014 (aged 59)
- Place of death: Sofia, Bulgaria
- Position: Defender

Senior career*
Years	Team	Apps	(Gls)
1973–1977	Dimitrovgrad		
1977–1978	Botev Plovdiv	22	(0)
1978–1982	CSKA Sofia	64	(1)
1982–1985	Sliven	62	(1)
1985–1987	Dimitrovgrad		
1987–1988	Akademik Sofia		

Managerial career
- 2003–2010: CSKA Sofia (academy coach)
- * Club domestic league appearances and goals

Angel Kalburov (Bulgarian: Ангел Калбуров; 13 March 1955 – 8 May 2014) was a Bulgarian footballer who played as a defender.

== Honours ==
=== Club ===
CSKA Sofia

- Bulgarian League (3): 1979–80, 1980–81, 1981–82
