= Sefedin Braho =

Albanian footballer (1953–2024)

Personal information
- Date of birth: 18 August 1953
- Place of birth: Gjirokastër, Albania
- Date of death: 6 October 2024 (aged 71)
- Height: 1.84 m (6 ft 0 in)
- Position: Forward

Youth career
- –1970: Luftëtari

Senior career*
Years	Team	Apps	(Gls)
1970–1972	Luftëtari		
1972–1974	Partizani		(7+)
1974–1988	Luftëtari		
1979	→ Partizani (loan)	0	(0)
1980	→ Partizani (loan)	0	(0)

International career
1972–1976	Albania U23	4	(0)
1983–1984	Albania U21	2	(0)
1973–1983	Albania	9	(1)
- * Club domestic league appearances and goals

Sefedin Braho (18 August 1953 – 6 October 2024) was an Albanian footballer who played as a forward for Luftëtari and Partizani in Albania.

== International career ==
Braho made his debut for Albania in a May 1973 FIFA World Cup qualification match against Romania in Tirana and earned a total of nine caps, scoring one goal. His final international was a June 1983 European Championship qualification match against Austria.

== Death ==
Braho died on 6 October 2024, at the age of 71.

== Career statistics ==
Appearances and goals by national team and year
National team	Year	Apps	Goals
Albania	1973	3	0
Albania	1980	4	1
Albania	1981	1	0
Albania	1983	1	0
Total		9	1

== Honours ==
Partizani

- Kategoria Superiore: 1971
