= FC Dimitrovgrad =

Bulgarian football club

Dimitrovgrad
- Full name: Football Club Dimitrovgrad
- Founded: 1947; 79 years ago
- Ground: Minyor Stadium, Dimitrovgrad
- Capacity: 10,000
- Chairman: Angel Kolev
- Manager: Todor Manev
- League: South-East Third League
- 2023–24: South-East Third League, 6th
Home colours	Away colours

Football Club Dimitrovgrad is a Bulgarian association football club based in Dimitrovgrad, Haskovo Province, currently playing in the South-East Third League, the third level of Bulgarian football.

The club's home ground is the Minyor Stadium in Dimitrovgrad, with a capacity of 10,000. Team colours are blue and yellow.

== Honours ==
- Cup of Amateur Football League
  - Winners (1): 2000–01 (as Siera)
- B PFG
  - Runners-up (2): 1978–79, 1985–86

== History ==
In 1967, the two former city club rivals, F.C. Himik and F.C. Minyor merged to establish a new club, named Football Club Dimitrovgrad. One of the original clubs, Himik, managed to compete in the A Group, in 1962–63.

In 1986, F.C. Dimitrovgrad qualified for the A PFG for first time in the club's history. The team won just eight games in their first A PFG campaign in 1986–87 season and were relegated, finishing in the last 16th place.

In 2000–01 season F.C. Dimitrovgrad, as F.C. Siera, won the Cup of Amateur Football League.

== Current squad ==
As of 1 September 2019 Note: Flags indicate national team as defined under FIFA eligibility rules; some limited exceptions apply. Players may hold more than one non-FIFA nationality.

No.	Pos.	Nation	Player
1	GK	BUL	Stamen Boyadziev
4	DF	BUL	Gabriel Georgiev
5	DF	BUL	Stanislav Mitov
6	DF	BUL	Aleksandar Shabarkov
7	MF	BUL	Genadi Zhelev
8	MF	BUL	Aleksandar Daiov
9	FW	BUL	Rayko Raykov
10	MF	BUL	Anton Kolev (third-captain)
11	FW	BUL	Grigor Georgiev
12	GK	BUL	Yanislav Georgiev

No.	Pos.	Nation	Player
13	DF	BUL	Filip Santov
15	DF	BUL	Tsanko Biserov
16	FW	BUL	Ahmed Osman
17	MF	BUL	Nikolai Georgiev
18	MF	BUL	Mario Yovov
19	MF	BUL	Vasil Santov
20	DF	BUL	Damyan Chaushev
21	MF	BUL	Slavi Kirilov
22	FW	BUL	Tsvetomir Matev (vice-captain)
23	DF	BUL	Chavdar Kamov (captain)
24	MF	BUL	Daniel Dobrikov

== Notable players ==
Had international caps for their respective countries, held any club record, or had more than 100 league appearances. Players whose name is listed in bold represented their countries.

Bulgaria

- (Bulgaria) Ahmed Osman
- (Bulgaria) **Yancho Dimitrov**
- (Bulgaria) **Doncho Donev**
- (Bulgaria) **Ivan Iliev**
- (Bulgaria) **Angel Kalburov**
- (Bulgaria) **Elin Topuzakov**
- (Bulgaria) **Doncho Donev**
- (Bulgaria) **Mitko Trendafilov**
- (Bulgaria) **Petar Zhekov**

Europe

- (Russia) **Viktor Bulatov**
