= Iliya Voynov =

Bulgarian footballer

Personal information
- Full name: Iliya Tsvetanov Voynov
- Date of birth: 21 March 1964 (age 62)
- Place of birth: Vratsa, Bulgaria
- Positions: Winger; forward

Youth career
- Botev Vratsa

Senior career*
Years	Team	Apps	(Gls)
1981–1983	Botev Vratsa	53	(4)
1983–1985	CSKA Sofia	35	(3)
1985–1988	Botev Vratsa	75	(11)
1989–1991	Portimonense	54	(12)
1991–1995	Estoril Praia	128	(31)
1995–1996	Estrela da Amadora	21	(3)
1996–1997	CSKA Sofia	20	(4)
1997–2001	Spartak Pleven	21	(10)

International career
1986–1987	Bulgaria	8	(0)
- * Club domestic league appearances and goals

Iliya Voynov (Bulgarian: Илия Войнов; born 21 March 1964) is a former Bulgarian footballer who played as a winger. He earned 8 caps for the Bulgaria national team.

== Honours ==
=== Club ===
CSKA Sofia

- Bulgarian Cup: 1984–‘1985; 1996-1997
- Cup of the Soviet Army: 1984–85
- A Group: 1996–97
