= Stoycho Mladenov Jr. =

Bulgarian footballer

Stoycho Mladenov
Personal information
- Full name: Stoycho Stoychev Mladenov
- Date of birth: 19 June 1985 (age 41)
- Place of birth: Sofia, Bulgaria
- Height: 1.82 m (5 ft 11 1/2 in)
- Position: Attacking midfielder

Team information
- Current team: Bulgaria 21 (assistant manager)

Youth career
- CSKA Sofia

Senior career*
Years	Team	Apps	(Gls)
2002–2006	CSKA Sofia	6	(0)
2006	Lokomotiv Mezdra	12	(5)
2007	Naftex Burgas	8	(2)
2007	Vihren Sandanski	3	(0)
2008	Minyor Pernik	4	(1)
2008–2009	Akademik Sofia	14	(3)
2009–2010	Sportist Svoge	23	(3)
2010–2011	Beroe Stara Zagora	9	(0)
2011	Etar 1924	10	(1)
2012	Lokomotiv Sofia	0	(0)
Total		63	(15)

Managerial career
- 2013–2015: CSKA Sofia (assistant manager)
- 2015: Al Ittihad (assistant manager)
- 2016: Atyrau (assistant manager)
- 2016–2020: Kaisar (assistant manager)
- 2025–: Bulgaria 21 (assistant manager)
- * Club domestic league appearances and goals as of 3 April 2012

Stoycho Mladenov Jr. (Bulgarian: Стойчо Младенов - Младши; born 19 June 1985) is a former Bulgarian football player, who played as a midfielder.

He started his career in CSKA Sofia. He played for a few clubs, including Naftex Burgas, Lokomotiv Mezdra and FC Vihren Sandanski. He is the son of Stoycho Mladenov, a famous Bulgarian football player and manager.
