= Leo Houtsonen =

Finnish footballer (1958–2019)

Personal information
- Date of birth: 25 October 1958
- Place of birth: Pieksämäki, Finland
- Date of death: 5 June 2019 (aged 60)
- Place of death: Kuopio, Finland
- Position: Midfielder

Youth career
- Kuopion Palloseura

Senior career*
| Years | Team | Apps | (Gls) |
| 1975–1977 | Kuopion Palloseura | 63 | (5) |
| 1978–1980 | Oulun Palloseura | 80 | (15) |
| 1981 | Kuopion Palloseura | 29 | (10) |
| 1982-1983 | Oulun Palloseura | 54 | (14) |
| 1984–1987 | Kuopion Palloseura | 74 | (16) |
| 1991-1992 | Kings Kuopio | | |
| 1992 | Kuopion Palloseura | 7 | (0) |
| 1993 | Kings Kuopio | | |

International career
| 1978–1986 | Finland | 45 | (1) |
- * Club domestic league appearances and goals

Leo Houtsonen (25 October 1958 – 5 June 2019) was a Finnish footballer. He played in 45 matches for the Finland national football team from 1978 to 1986. In his career he played for Kuopion Palloseura and Oulun Palloseura. He was born in Pieksämäki to refugees from Karelia, but was raised in Kuopio. He was part of Finnish under-18 national team that won silver in under-18 UEFA european championships held in 1975, losing 0-1 to England in final. During his career he was approached by Newcastle United and Norwich City but he turned those offers down. Along with his footballing career he held civilian job in a financing company and was active in his local orthodox church.
