= Krasimir Bezinski =

Bulgarian footballer and coach (1961–2019)

Krasimir Bezinski Красимир Безински
Personal information
- Full name: Krasimir Smilenov Bezinski
- Date of birth: 29 June 1961
- Place of birth: Blagoevgrad, Bulgaria
- Date of death: 22 April 2019 (aged 57)
- Place of death: Sofia, Bulgaria
- Position: Defender

Senior career*
Years	Team	Apps	(Gls)
1978–1981	Pirin Blagoevgrad	57	(5)
1981–1989	CSKA Sofia	204	(7)
1989–1991	Portimonense	80	(1)
1992–1993	CSKA Sofia	41	(1)
1993	Hapoel Petah Tikva	7	(0)
1994	Maccabi Ironi Ashdod	9	(0)
1994–1995	Pirin Blagoevgrad	6	(0)
Total		404	(14)

International career
1980–1993	Bulgaria	21	(0)

Managerial career
- 2000–2001: CSKA Sofia (assistant)
- 2003–2004: Beroe (assistant)
- 2006–2007: Bulgaria (assistant)
- 2008: Simba
- 2009–2010: Bulgaria (assistant)
- 2010–2011: Al-Qadsiah (assistant)
- 2013: Al Safa
- 2014: CSKA Sofia (scout)
- 2014: Al Safa
- 2018: CSKA Sofia (assistant)
- * Club domestic league appearances and goals

Krasimir Smilenov Bezinski (Bulgarian: Красимир Смиленов Безински; 29 June 1961 – 22 April 2019) was a Bulgarian footballer and football coach.

Bezinski's professional playing career as a defender spanned nearly 20 years, during which he played for five clubs: Pirin Blagoevgrad, CSKA Sofia, Portimonense, Maccabi Ironi Ashdod and Hapoel Petah Tikva. He also made 21 appearances for the Bulgaria national team.

== Playing career ==
Born in Blagoevgrad, Bezinski began his career at local club Pirin, where he played 57 matches between 1978 and 1981. With Pirin he was a losing finalist in the 1980–81 Bulgarian Cup. Then he left to join CSKA Sofia. Bezinski spent eight seasons with CSKA, where he won four Bulgarian League titles, six Bulgarian Cups and three Cups of the Soviet Army. Together with Elin Topuzakov and Momchil Tsvetanov he holds the record for the most times an individual player has won the Bulgarian Cup.

In 1989, Bezinski joined Portuguese side Portimonense, where he played 80 matches for two and a half seasons. After leaving the club in January 1992, he re-joined CSKA Sofia, where he won the title in 1992 and the cup in 1993.

Then Bezinski spent one season in Israel with Hapoel Petah Tikva and Maccabi Ironi Ashdod. In the 1994–1995 season he appeared for his first club Pirin Blagoevgrad, where ended his playing career.

== Managerial career ==
His coaching career started in 1995. Bezinski worked in the Bulgarian National Team for four years as an assistant coach. He then travelled to Tanzania where he was head coach of Simba S.C. for seven months and was invited to return to the position of an assistant coach of the Bulgarian National Team in January 2009 where he worked until March 2010.

He was then appointed assistant coach of Al-Qadsiah who played in Professional Saudi Arabian Football League. Before returning to CSKA Sofia as scout he spent 2 month head coach of Al Safa who played in Saudi Arabian D2 League. In May 2014, Al-Safa announced return of Bezinski as head coach of their football team who is now playing in D1 Professional Football League. After spending 2 months and losing his first crown prince game in round 32 playoff against Nahdha team, his contract with AL-Safa was terminated and he returned to Bulgaria.

== Career statistics ==
=== Club ===
Club performance		League		Cup		Continental		Total	
Club	Season	Apps	Goals	Apps	Goals	Apps	Goals	Apps	Goals
Pirin Blagoevgrad	1978–79	9	1	?	?	–		9	1
Pirin Blagoevgrad	1979–80	20	2	?	?	–		20	2
Pirin Blagoevgrad	1980–81	28	2	?	?	–		28	2
Pirin Blagoevgrad	Total	57	5	?	?	0	0	57	5
CSKA Sofia	1981–82	29	1	?	?	8	0	37	1
CSKA Sofia	1982–83	25	0	?	?	1	0	26	0
CSKA Sofia	1983–84	23	0	?	?	4	0	27	0
CSKA Sofia	1984–85	19	0	?	?	4	0	23	0
CSKA Sofia	1985–86	26	3	?	?	–		26	3
CSKA Sofia	1986–87	30	2	?	?	2	0	32	2
CSKA Sofia	1987–88	27	1	?	?	2	0	29	1
CSKA Sofia	1988–89	25	0	?	?	7	0	32	0
CSKA Sofia	Total	204	7	?	?	28	0	232	7
Portimonense	1989–90	32	0	?	?	–		32	0
Portimonense	1990–91	38	1	?	?	–		38	1
Portimonense	1991–92	10	0	?	?	–		10	0
Portimonense	Total	80	1	?	?	0	0	80	1
CSKA Sofia	1991–92	15	1	2	0	–		17	1
CSKA Sofia	1992–93	26	0	6	1	2	0	34	1
CSKA Sofia	Total	41	1	8	1	2	0	51	2
Hapoel Petah Tikva	1993–94	7	0	2	0	–		9	0
Maccabi Ironi Ashdod	1993–94	9	0	0	0	–		9	0
Pirin Blagoevgrad	1994–95	6	0	?	?	–		6	0
Career statistics		404	17	8	1	30	0	444	16

== Honours ==
=== Club ===
CSKA Sofia

- Bulgarian League (5): 1981–82, 1982–83, 1986–87, 1988–89, 1991–92
- Bulgarian Cup (6): 1982–83, 1984–85, 1986–87, 1987–88, 1988–89, 1992–93
- Cup of the Soviet Army (3): 1984-85, 1985-86, 1988-89
