= Stoycho Nedkov =

Bulgarian footballer

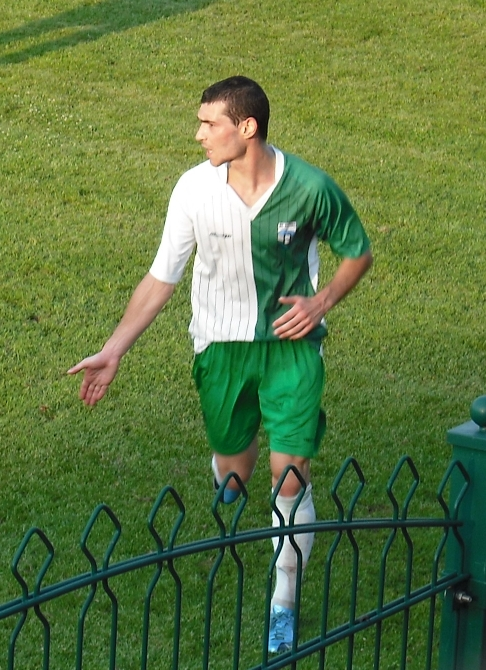

Personal information
- Date of birth: 16 October 1986 (age 40)
- Place of birth: Sofia, Bulgaria
- Height: 1.78 m (5 ft 10 in)
- Positions: Winger; wing-back

Team information
- Current team: Marek Dupnitsa

Youth career
- 1998–2005: Levski Sofia

Senior career*
Years	Team	Apps	(Gls)
2005–2006	Septemvri Sofia	17	(12)
2006–2007	Vihren Sandanski	6	(2)
2007–2008	Orfeas Nicosia	25	(15)
2009	Septemvri Sofia	14	(6)
2010	Levski Elin Pelin	8	(1)
2011–2012	Vitosha Bistritsa	15	(3)
2012–2013	Levski Karlovo	24	(0)
2014	Strumska Slava	6	(0)
2015	Sofia 2010	3	(0)
2016	Minyor Pernik	8	(0)
2016–2017	Germanea	31	(2)
2018	Levski Karlovo	15	(1)
2018–2019	Marek Dupnitsa	14	(3)
2019	Botev Ihtiman	3	(0)
2020–	Nadezhda Dobroslavtsi	33	(0)

International career
2004	Bulgaria U-19	1	(0)
- * Club domestic league appearances and goals

Stoycho Nedkov (Bulgarian: Стойчо Недков; born 1986) is a Bulgarian footballer who plays as a winger and a wing-back. He is a disciple of the Levski Sofia youth academy, where he was team captain.

== Career ==
=== Youth years ===
Nedkov joined the Levski youth academy in 1998, scoring a total of 90 goals in 142 games.

In 2004, as a member of Levski's U-19 squad, he gained notoriety during a friendly match versus Levski's men's team when he scored the winning goal against national team goalie Georgi Petkov.

He went on to score 14 goals during the 2004/05 season as Levski won the U-19 title.

=== Senior career ===
Nedkov's contribution to winning the youth title was noticed by scouts for Portuguese League side Académica de Coimbra, who invited him to Portugal for a tryout. He was ultimately unable to join the club as the quota for non-EU players had already been filled.

He went on to play for Septemvri Sofia, Vihren Sandanski, Orfeas Nicosia (gaining promotion to next division), and Vitosha Bistritsa, with whom he won the Amateur League Cup in 2012.

Nedkov is a graduate of the National Sports Academy with a bachelor's degree in football coaching and holds a UEFA B Licence.
