= Plamen Kazakov =

Bulgarian footballer

Personal information
- Full name: Plamen Iliev Kazakov
- Date of birth: 26 June 1962 (age 64)
- Place of birth: Provadia, Bulgaria
- Position: Attacking midfielder

Senior career*
| Years | Team | Apps | (Gls) |
| 1979–1981 | Spartak Varna | 3 | (0) |
| 1981–1982 | Cherno More | 27 | (2) |
| 1982–1990 | Spartak Varna | 222 | (54) |
| 1990–1991 | Paços de Ferreira | 17 | (3) |
| 1991–1992 | Spartak Varna | 30 | (10) |
| 1992–1993 | Shumen | 17 | (2) |
| 1993–1994 | Cherno More | 10 | (3) |
| 1994–1995 | Spartak Varna | 20 | (9) |
| 1995–1996 | Persebaya Surabaya | | (14) |
- * Club domestic league appearances and goals

Plamen Kazakov (Bulgarian: Пламен Казаков; born 26 June 1962) is a former Bulgarian footballer who played as an attacking midfielder and forward. He spent the majority of his career with Spartak Varna.

== Career ==
Kazakov scored 73 league goals for Spartak Varna, 39 of which were scored in the first division and 34 in the second division. On 28 September 1983, he scored in a 1–0 home win over Turkish side Mersin in the first round of the 1983–84 European Cup Winners' Cup; Spartak advanced 1–0 on aggregate.

After ten seasons at Spartak, Kazakov joined Paços de Ferreira in 1990, where he scored 3 goals in 17 league matches. After leaving Portuguese club at the end of the 1990–91 season, he re-joined Spartak.

Kazakov spent one season at Shumen, before joining Cherno More Varna in 1993. The following season, he appeared for his first club Spartak. Kazakov retired from competitive football at the end of the 1995–96 season with Persebaya Surabaya, at the age of 34.

In 2018, he established his own children's academy in Varna.
