= Tsvetan Yonchev =

Bulgarian footballer and manager

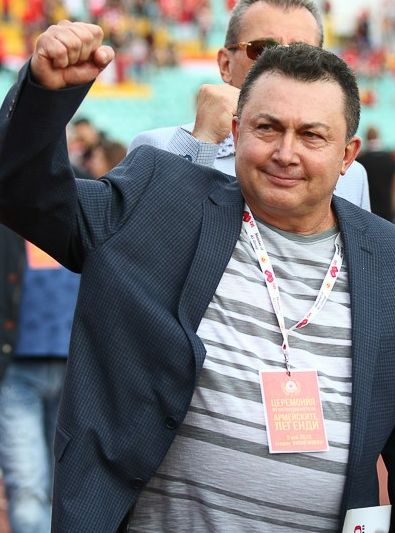

Personal information
- Full name: Tsvetan Borislavov Yonchev
- Date of birth: 15 February 1956 (age 70)
- Place of birth: Vratsa, Bulgaria
- Position: Winger

Senior career*
Years	Team	Apps	(Gls)
1973–1975	Botev Vratsa	55	(13)
1975–1984	CSKA Sofia	234	(54)
1984–1986	Slavia Sofia	56	(9)
1986–1987	Ludogorets Razgrad		
1987–1988	Felgueiras	18	(2)
1989	Anagennisi Karditsa		
1990	Ludogorets Razgrad		

International career
1980–1983	Bulgaria	23	(5)

Managerial career
- 1990–1992: CSKA Sofia (assistant)
- 1992–1993: CSKA Sofia
- 1997–1999: Velbazhd Kyustendil (assistant)
- 1999–2004: Chicago Wind (youth coach)
- 2004–2009: Lake Forest Academy (youth coach)
- 2015–: Minyor Chicago
- * Club domestic league appearances and goals

Tsvetan Yonchev (Bulgarian: Цветан Йончев; born 15 February 1956) is a former Bulgarian footballer who played as a winger, and a current manager of Minyor Chicago in the United States.

== Career ==
Yonchev was born in Vratsa. A youth product of hometown club Botev Vratsa, he spent two seasons with the first team, before switching to CSKA Sofia in 1975. He played 234 matches for the club in the A Group, scoring 54 goals.

Yonchev was a key part of the CSKA's team that reached 1980–81 European Cup quarterfinals and 1981–82 European Cup semifinals. On 17 September 1980, he scored in his side's 1–0 home win against holders Nottingham Forest; he also started in the second leg, a 1–0 win at City Ground. In the second round, Yonchev scored a hat-trick for a 4–0 home win over Szombierki Bytom. On 4 March 1981, he netted CSKA's only goal in a 5–1 loss against Liverpool at Anfield, in their quarter-final first leg tie.

With CSKA Yonchev won five A Group titles and one Bulgarian Cup. On 3 April 1983, he scored two goals as CSKA beat Spartak Varna 4–0 in the 1983 Bulgarian Cup Final.

After nine seasons at CSKA, Yonchev joined Slavia Sofia in 1984.

== Honours ==
=== Player ===
CSKA Sofia

- A Group (5): 1975–76, 1979–80, 1980–81, 1981–82, 1982–83
- Bulgarian Cup: 1983

=== Coach ===
CSKA Sofia

- Bulgarian Cup: 1993
