= Todor Atanasov =

Bulgarian footballer (1954–2020)

Personal information
- Full name: Todor Stefanov Atanasov
- Date of birth: 31 March 1954
- Place of birth: Kazanlak, Bulgaria
- Date of death: 8 November 2020 (aged 66)
- Place of death: Varna, Bulgaria
- Position: Attacking midfielder

Senior career*
Years	Team	Apps	(Gls)
1972–1977	Rozova Dolina	71	(25)
1977–1979	CSKA Sofia	13	(3)
1979–1990	Cherno More	320	(60)
1990–1991	Dorostol Silistra	–	(–)
1992–1993	Cherno More	55	(15)
- * Club domestic league appearances and goals

Todor Atanasov (Bulgarian: Тодор Атанасов; 31 March 1954 – 8 November 2020) was a Bulgarian footballer who played as an attacking midfielder. He spent the majority of his career with Cherno More Varna.
