= Georgi Velinov =

Bulgarian footballer (1957–2026)

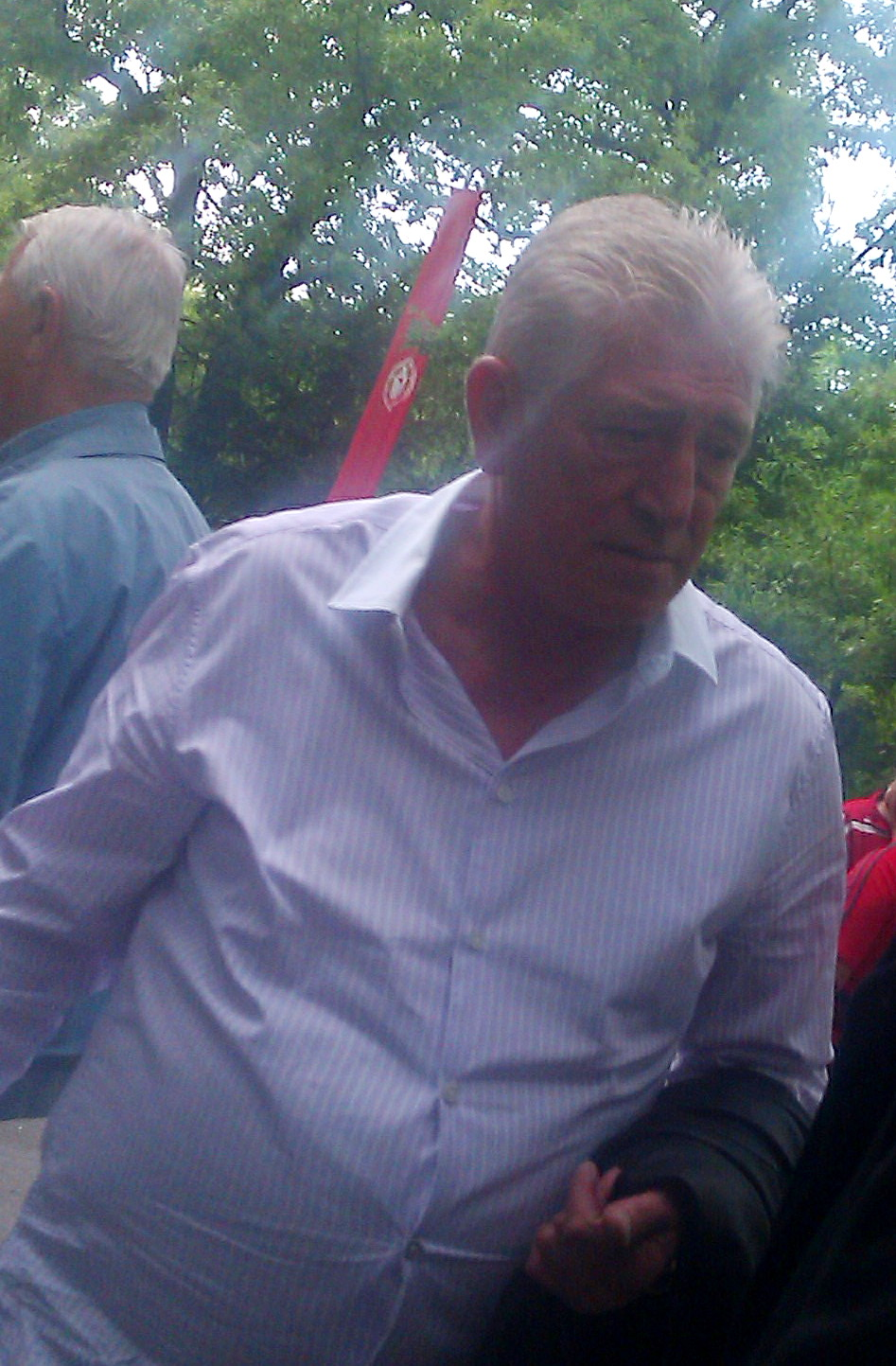

Personal information
- Full name: Georgi Velinov Velinov
- Date of birth: 5 October 1957
- Place of birth: Ruse, Bulgaria
- Date of death: 1 March 2026 (aged 68)
- Height: 1.90 m (6 ft 3 in)
- Position: Goalkeeper

Senior career*
Years	Team	Apps	(Gls)
1974–1976	Dunav Ruse	4	(0)
1976–1978	Cherno More	70	(0)
1978–1987	CSKA Sofia	221	(0)
1987–1988	Braga	13	(0)
1988–1989	Atlético CP	20	(1)
1989–1990	O Elvas	15	(0)
1990–1991	Sliven	28	(0)
1991–1992	CSKA Sofia	36	(0)
1993	Slavia Sofia	6	(0)
1994	Sliven		(0)
1995	Botev Novi Pazar		(0)

International career
1976–1979	Bulgaria U21	21	(0)
1979–1983	Bulgaria	28	(0)
- * Club domestic league appearances and goals

Georgi Velinov Velinov (Bulgarian: Георги Велинов Велинов; 5 October 1957 – 1 March 2026), nicknamed Johnny, was a Bulgarian professional football player and manager. A goalkeeper, he was elected Bulgarian Footballer of the Year in 1981.

== Career ==
Velinov played for Dunav Ruse (1974–75, four A PFG matches) and Cherno More (1976–1978, 37 A PFG matches) before joining CSKA Sofia, of whom he was part of from 1978 to 1987. During his first stay with CSKA, Velinov won the A PFG in 1980, 1981, 1982, 1983 and 1987 and the Bulgarian Cup in 1981, 1983, 1985 and 1987. Velinov then moved to Portugal to play for Braga (1987–88), Atlético CP (1988–89) and O Elvas (1989–90). He returned to Bulgaria and played one more season with CSKA, 1991–92, winning the A PFG once more and setting his number of league appearances for CSKA at 285.

He continued his career in Slavia Sofa (1993–94, 12 A PFG matches), PFC Sliven (1994) and Botev Novi Pazar (1995). His career spanned 338 A PFG matches, 33 senior Bulgaria national team appearances, 21 under-21 features and 17 junior international games. He was awarded a Master of Sports honour in 1980 and won the Bulgarian Footballer of the Year prize in 1981.

In 1995–1996, Velinov was the manager of Lokomotiv Ruse; it was under his management that Lokomotiv first managed to defeat their local rivals Dunav, beating them 1–0. The defeat meant Dunav would be relegated to the amateur V AFG for the first time ever while Lokomotiv would remain in the B PFG. He also worked as a goalkeeper coach and as a coach in CSKA's youth teams.

== Personal life and death ==
In May 2007, Velinov became a liver transplant recipient. He died on 1 March 2026, at the age of 68.
