= Georgi Iliev (footballer, born 1956) =

Bulgarian footballer and manager

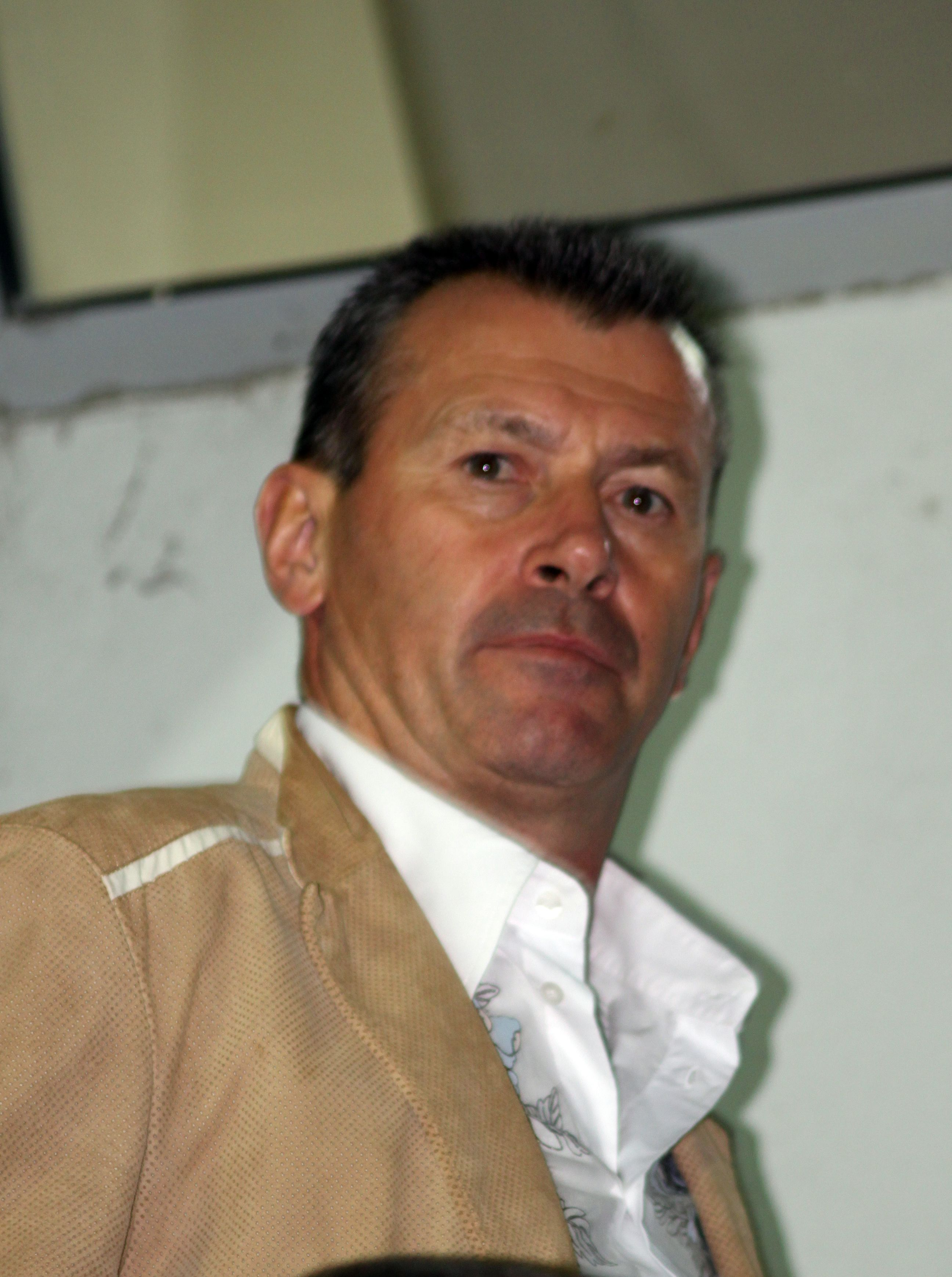

Personal information
- Full name: Georgi Kirilov Iliev
- Date of birth: 15 September 1956 (age 70)
- Place of birth: Bankya, Bulgaria
- Position: Defender

Senior career*
Years	Team	Apps	(Gls)
1975–1976	Sliven	36	(0)
1976–1983	CSKA Sofia	97	(3)
1978–1980	→ Sliven (loan)	40	(6)
1984	Dunav Ruse	?	(?)
1984–1988	Slavia Sofia	89	(5)
1988	Lokomotiv Sofia	11	(2)
1989	IF Elfsborg	?	(?)

International career
1980–1982	Bulgaria	5	(0)

Managerial career
- 2022–: CSKA Sofia
- * Club domestic league appearances and goals

Georgi Iliev, nicknamed The Michael (Bulgarian: Георги Илиев, Майкъла) (born 15 September 1956) is a retired Bulgarian footballer and manager.

== Career ==
In his career, Iliev played for Sliven, CSKA Sofia, Slavia Sofia, Loko Sofia and Dunav Ruse. With CSKA Sofia, he won 4 A PFG titles between 1980 and 1983 and was also Bulgarian Cup holder twice – in 1981 and 1983. Iliev managed the "armymen" from 1990 to 1993.

He is also a businessman. Iliev is married to Elizabeth and they have three sons – George, Georg and Georgi.
