= Lachezar Tanev =

Bulgarian footballer

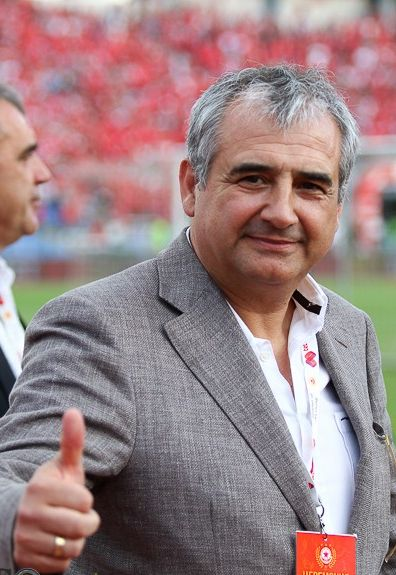

Personal information
- Full name: Lachezar Georgiev Tanev
- Date of birth: 1 October 1963 (age 63)
- Place of birth: Pleven, Bulgaria
- Position: Midfielder

Senior career*
Years	Team	Apps	(Gls)
1979–1983	Spartak Pleven	53	(10)
1983–1989	CSKA Sofia	129	(61)
1989–1990	G.D. Chaves	36	(9)
1990–1991	CE Sabadell	9	(0)
1991–1992	CSKA Sofia	11	(1)
1992–1993	Lokomotiv Sofia	19	(3)
1993–1994	CSKA Sofia	26	(1)

International career
1983–1991	Bulgaria	25	(5)
- * Club domestic league appearances and goals

Lachezar Tanev (born 1 October 1963) is a retired Bulgarian football midfielder. Tanev has been a licensed FIFA players agent since 1995.

Tanev played club football for Spartak Pleven and PFC CSKA Sofia in the Bulgarian A PFG. He also had a spell with G.D. Chaves in the Portuguese Liga.

Tanev made 25 appearances for the Bulgaria national football team.
