= Kostadin Yanchev =

Bulgarian footballer

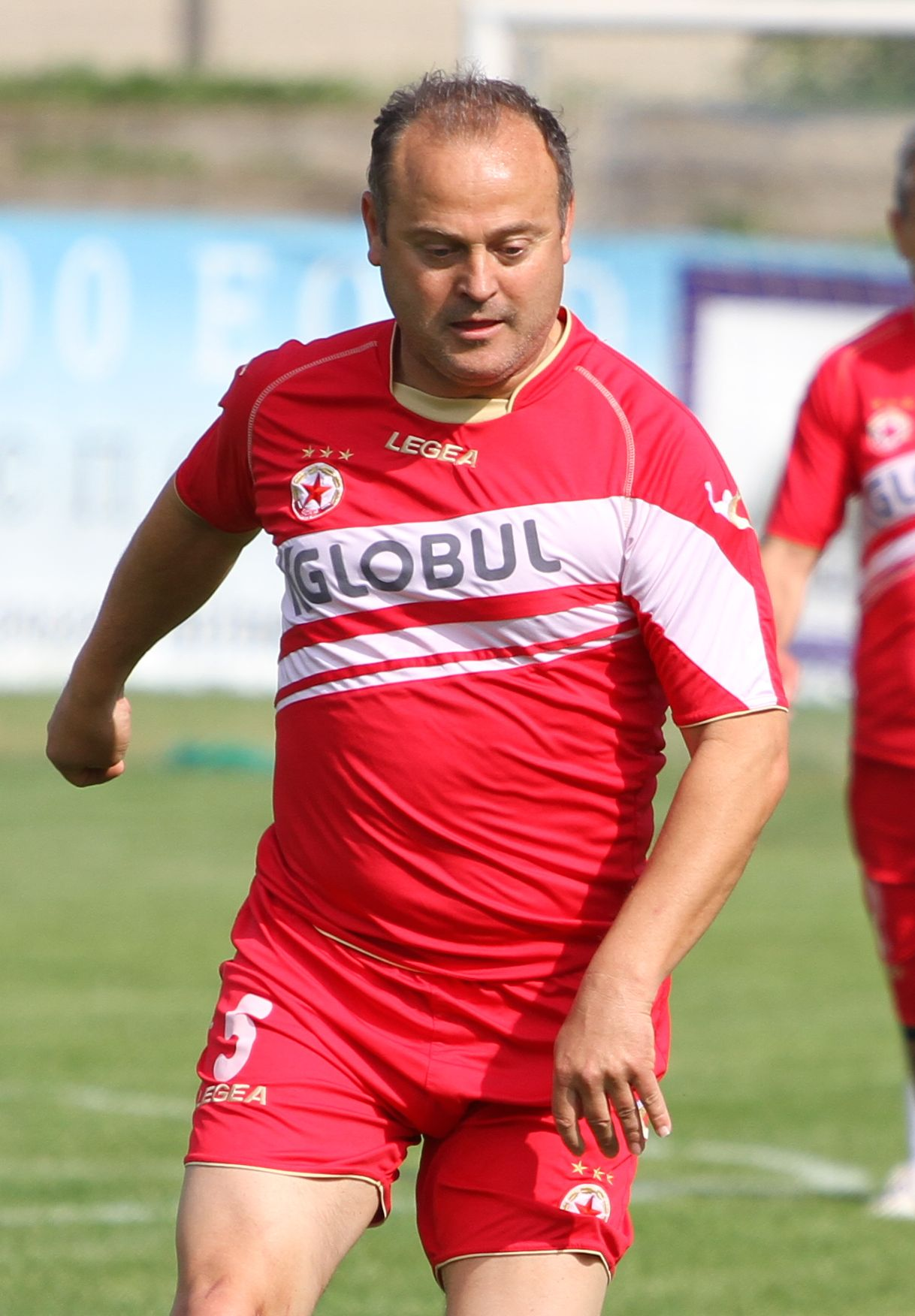

Personal information
- Date of birth: 19 March 1963 (age 63)
- Place of birth: Blagoevgrad, Bulgaria
- Height: 1.76 m (5 ft 9 in)
- Position: Midfielder

Senior career*
Years	Team	Apps	(Gls)
1981–1984	Pirin Blagoevgrad	91	(18)
1984–1990	CSKA Sofia	159	(13)
1991–1992	Las Palmas	39	(3)
1993	Yantra Gabrovo		
1993	Montana		
1994	CSKA Sofia	17	(0)

International career
1983–1989	Bulgaria	16	(0)
- * Club domestic league appearances and goals

Kostadin Yanchev (Bulgarian: Костадин Янчев; born 19 March 1963) is a Bulgarian former footballer who played at both professional and international levels as a midfielder. He earned 16 caps for the Bulgaria national side between 1983 and 1989.

== Career ==
Born in Blagoevgrad, Yanchev started his career at hometown club Pirin Blagoevgrad before transferring to CSKA Sofia in June 1984.

Yanchev spent six and a half seasons with CSKA, where he won three A Group titles, four Bulgarian Cups and one Bulgarian Supercup. He played 159 league matches for the club, scoring 13 goals.

In early 1991, Yanchev joined Spanish side Las Palmas. After leaving Las Palmas in January 1993, he joined Yantra Gabrovo. He spent six months with Montana, before finishing his career with CSKA in 1994.
