= Georgi Slavkov =

Bulgarian footballer

Personal information
- Full name: Georgi Georgiev Slavkov
- Date of birth: 11 April 1958
- Place of birth: Musomishta, Bulgaria
- Date of death: 21 January 2014 (aged 55)
- Place of death: Plovdiv, Bulgaria
- Position: Forward

Youth career
- 1972–1973: Trakia Stamboliyski
- 1973–1976: Trakia Plovdiv

Senior career*
Years	Team	Apps	(Gls)
1976–1982	Trakia Plovdiv	112	(61)
1980	→ CSKA Sofia (loan)	9	(5)
1982–1986	CSKA Sofia	92	(43)
1986–1987	Saint-Étienne	16	(0)
1987–1992	Chaves	89	(15)
1992–1993	Botev Plovdiv	5	(0)
Total		323	(124)

International career
1978–1984	Bulgaria	30	(12)
- * Club domestic league appearances and goals

Georgi Georgiev Slavkov (Bulgarian: Георги Георгиев Славков; April 11, 1958 – January 21, 2014) was a Bulgarian football player who played as a forward. Slavkov played for Trakia Plovdiv, CSKA Sofia, Saint-Étienne and Chaves. He also gained 30 Bulgarian caps between 1978 and 1984, scoring 12 goals.

== Career ==
Slavkov began his career as a youth player with Trakia Stamboliyski, before joining Trakia Plovdiv in 1973.

Slavkov scored 61 goals in 112 games for Trakia between 1976 and 1982. During the 1980–81 season, he scored 31 league goals in 23 league games, becoming A PFG top goal-scorer and winning the European Golden Shoe.

With CSKA Sofia he played between 1982 and 1986, scoring 48 goals. Then he was transferred to the French club AS Saint-Étienne. He finished his career in Portugal in 1992.

In his career Slavkov participated in 4 Plovdiv Derby matches, scoring one goal, as well as 7 Eternal Derby encounters, netting once.

Between 1978 and 1984, he won 30 caps for Bulgaria and scored 11 goals.

Slavkov died suddenly on Jan 21, 2014 in Plovdiv after suffering a heart attack at the age of 55.

== Honours ==
=== Club ===
Botev Plovdiv

- Bulgarian Cup: 1980–81

CSKA Sofia

- A Group (2): 1979–80, 1982–83
- Bulgarian Cup: 1984–85
- Cup of the Soviet Army (2): 1984–85, 1985–86

=== Individual ===
- A Group Top Scorer: 1980–81 (31 goals)
- European Golden Shoe: 1981
