= Plamen Markov =

Bulgarian footballer

- Markov in 2026

Personal information
- Full name: Plamen Markov Markov
- Date of birth: 11 September 1957 (age 69)
- Place of birth: Sevlievo, Bulgaria
- Height: 1.78 m (5 ft 10 in)
- Position: Midfielder

Youth career
- 1970–1973: Rakovski Sevlievo

Senior career*
Years	Team	Apps	(Gls)
1973–1975	Rakovski Sevlievo		
1975–1985	CSKA Sofia	235	(42)
1985–1987	Metz	69	(10)
1987–1990	Grenoble	55	(13)

International career
1978–1986	Bulgaria	38	(6)

Managerial career
- 1988–1989: Grenoble
- 1991–1992: Yantra Gabrovo
- 1995: CSKA Sofia
- 1996–1997: Yantra Gabrovo
- 1997–1998: Minyor Pernik
- 1998–2001: Vidima Rakovski
- 2001–2004: Bulgaria
- 2005–2006: Vidima Rakovski
- 2006–2007: CSKA Sofia
- 2007: Wydad Casablanca
- 2008: Bulgaria
- * Club domestic league appearances and goals

Plamen Markov Markov (Пламен Марков Марков) (born 11 September 1957) is a Bulgarian retired professional footballer who played as a midfielder for clubs in Bulgaria and France. He played for the Bulgaria national team at international level.

== Playing career ==
Markov was born in Sevlievo. He played for the Bulgaria national team on 32 occasions, including a match in the 1986 World Cup against Argentina.

In June 1985 he moved from CSKA Sofia to join French club FC Metz, playing 87 matches for them. After the 1986–87 season he transferred to Grenoble. He retired as a player in 1990.

== Coaching career ==
His first coaching job came with Grenoble, and he was later in charge at his former club, CSKA Sofia, but he was sacked in 1995.

In 2001, he was appointed as coach of the Bulgaria national team. He stepped down as coach of Bulgaria after the Euro 2004 tournament.

He was reappointed as Bulgaria coach in January 2008, but was sacked in December 2008 following three draws in their 2010 FIFA World Cup qualifying campaign.

== Personal life ==
Markov is married and has two daughters.
