= Radoslav Zdravkov =

Bulgarian footballer

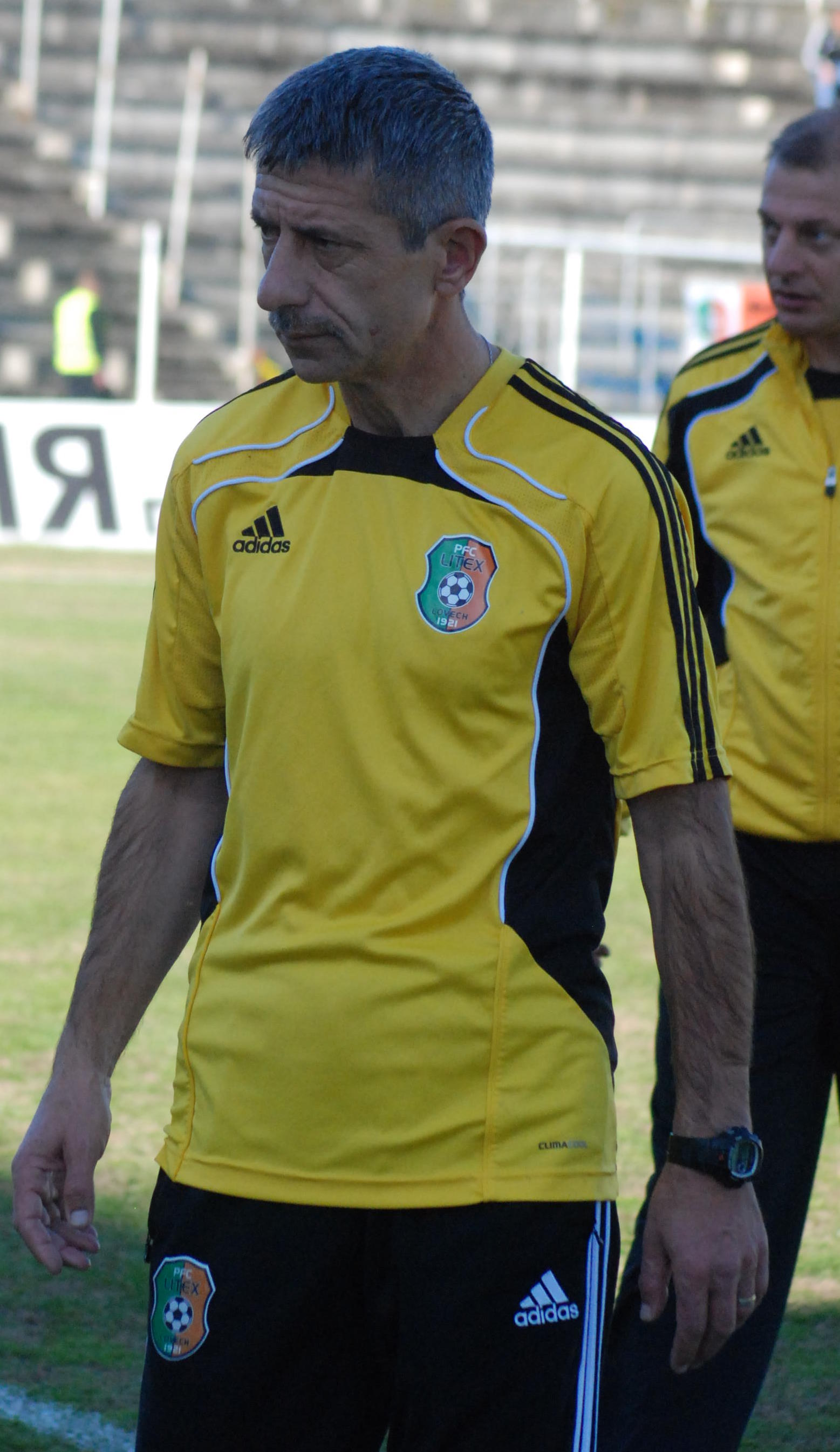

Personal information
- Full name: Radoslav Metodiev Zdravkov
- Date of birth: 30 July 1956 (age 70)
- Place of birth: Sofia, Bulgaria
- Height: 1.78 m (5 ft 10 in)
- Position: Attacking midfielder

Senior career*
| Years | Team | Apps | (Gls) |
| 1973–1980 | Lokomotiv Sofia | 132 | (33) |
| 1980–1986 | CSKA Sofia | 165 | (41) |
| 1986–1989 | Chaves | 100 | (43) |
| 1989–1990 | Braga | 21 | (1) |
| 1990–1991 | Paços Ferreira | 29 | (10) |
| 1991–1992 | Felgueiras | | |
| 1992–1993 | Yantra Gabrovo | 15 | (6) |
| 1993–1994 | Litex Lovech | | |

International career
| 1975–1988 | Bulgaria | 71 | (11) |

Managerial career
- 1991–1992: Felgueiras (player-coach)
- 1992–1993: Yantra Gabrovo
- 1993–1994: Litex Lovech
- 1994–1995: Lokomotiv Sofia
- 1996: Slavia Sofia
- 1997: Lokomotiv Plovdiv
- 1998–1999: Spartak Varna
- 1999–2000: Cherno More Varna
- 2000–2001: Lokomotiv Sofia
- 2004–2005: Spartak Varna
- 2007–2008: Beroe Stara Zagora
- 2008: Spartak Varna
- 2017–2019: Ludogorets Razgrad II
- 2019–2020: Lokomotiv Sofia
- 2021–2022: CSKA 1948 Sofia (sports director)
- 2023–2024: Hebar Pazardzhik (assistant)
- 2024–2025: CSKA Sofia (scout)
- * Club domestic league appearances and goals

Radoslav Metodiev Zdravkov (Bulgarian: Радослав Meтoдиeв Здравков; born 30 July 1956) is a Bulgarian former professional footballer who played as an attacking midfielder.

== Club career ==
Zdravkov was born in Sofia. During his professional career, which spanned nearly 20 years, he represented Lokomotiv Sofia, CSKA Sofia, Portugal's G.D. Chaves, S.C. Braga, F.C. Paços de Ferreira and F.C. Felgueiras – after he had left the Iron Curtain at the age of 30 – FC Yantra and PFC Litex Lovech.

During his stay abroad he was known as Radi, and he was instrumental in lowly Chaves' first ever qualification to the UEFA Cup in the 1986–87 season, as fifth. From 1992 onwards he worked as a full-time manager, going on to be in charge of several clubs, including PFC Spartak Varna on three occasions.

== International career ==
Zdravkov earned 71 caps and scored eleven goals for the Bulgaria national team during 13 years, and played at the 1986 FIFA World Cup finals.

== Career statistics ==
Appearances and goals by national team and year
| National team | Year | Apps | Goals |
|---|---|---|---|
| Bulgaria | 1975 | 2 | 0 |
| Bulgaria | 1976 | 1 | 0 |
| Bulgaria | 1977 | 2 | 0 |
| Bulgaria | 1978 | 5 | 0 |
| Bulgaria | 1979 | 5 | 0 |
| Bulgaria | 1980 | 1 | 0 |
| Bulgaria | 1981 | 8 | 3 |
| Bulgaria | 1982 | 9 | 3 |
| Bulgaria | 1983 | 10 | 1 |
| Bulgaria | 1984 | 9 | 1 |
| Bulgaria | 1985 | 12 | 3 |
| Bulgaria | 1986 | 5 | 0 |
| Bulgaria | 1988 | 2 | 0 |
| Total | | 71 | 11 |
