= Stoycho Mladenov =

Bulgarian footballer

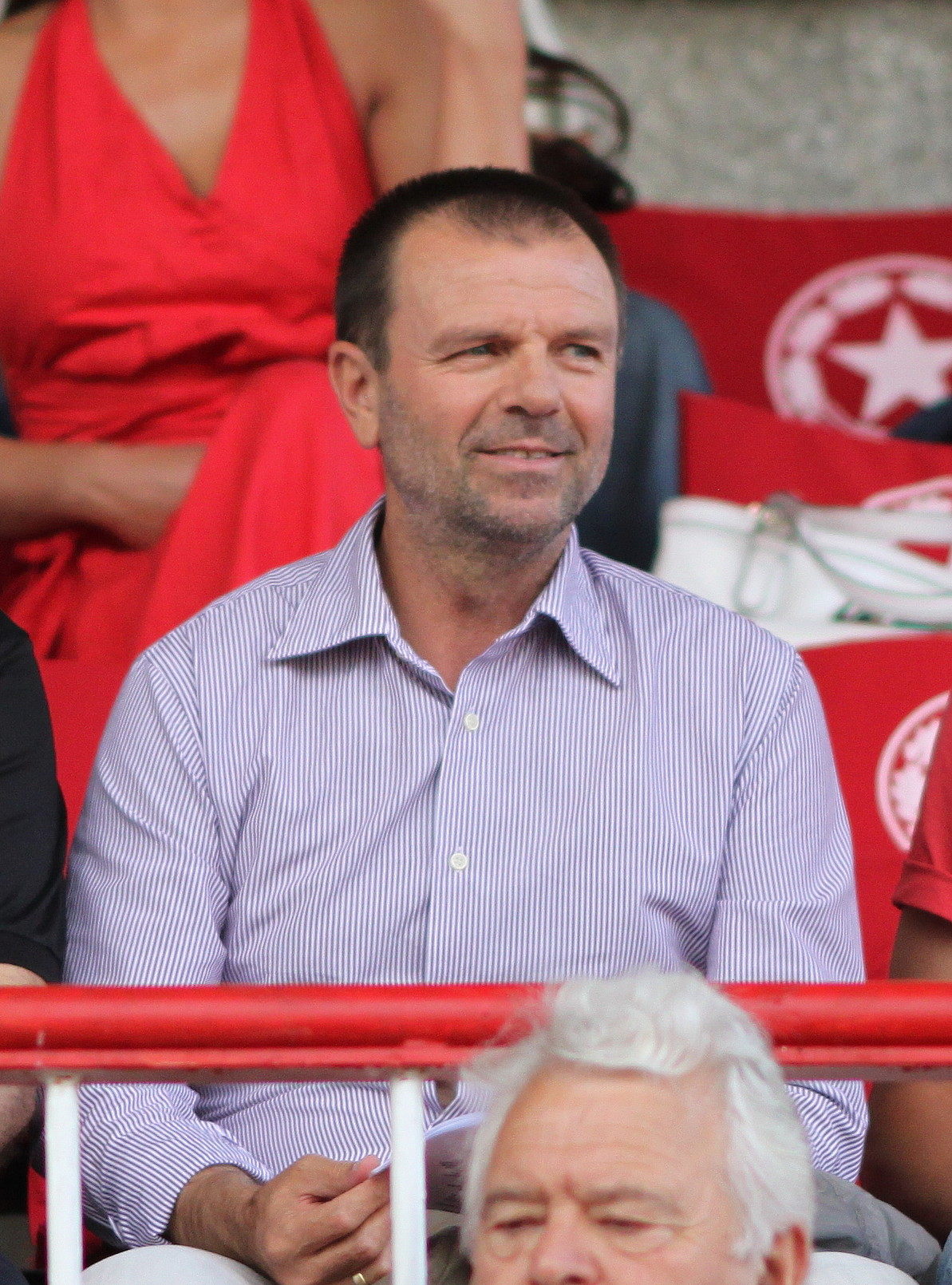

Personal information
- Full name: Stoycho Dimitrov Mladenov
- Date of birth: 12 April 1957 (age 69)
- Place of birth: Ploski, Bulgaria
- Height: 1.78 m (5 ft 10 in)
- Position: Forward

Youth career
- Dimitrovgrad

Senior career*
Years	Team	Apps	(Gls)
1975–1976	Dimitrovgrad	31	(6)
1976–1979	Beroe	81	(42)
1980–1986	CSKA Sofia	158	(80)
1986–1989	Belenenses	88	(30)
1989–1991	Vitória de Setúbal	63	(22)
1991–1993	Estoril Praia	39	(7)
1993–1994	Olhanense	5	(0)
Total		465	(187)

International career
1978–1988	Bulgaria	59	(15)

Managerial career
- 1991–1993: Estoril
- 1993–1995: Olhanense
- 1997: Belenenses
- 2000–2002: Bulgaria
- 2002–2003: CSKA Sofia
- 2004: Litex Lovech
- 2005: Kastoria
- 2005: Kallithea
- 2006: Veria
- 2007–2008: CSKA Sofia
- 2008–2009: Al-Ahli
- 2009–2011: ENPPI Club
- 2012–2013: CSKA Sofia
- 2013–2015: CSKA Sofia
- 2015: El Ittihad Alexandria
- 2016: Atyrau
- 2017–2020: Kaisar
- 2021–2022: CSKA Sofia
- * Club domestic league appearances and goals

Stoycho Dimitrov Mladenov (Bulgarian: Стойчо Димитpoв Младенов; born 12 April 1957) is a Bulgarian former football player and manager. He has 212 matches and 107 goals for CSKA. With the club he won the national title 6 times, 4 as a player and 2 as a coach.

== Career ==
Mladenov started from small teams like Dimitrovgrad and gradually moved to bigger teams like CSKA Sofia. From there he went all around the world, however his best moments of winning were in Portugal and also with his National Team. His best years were spent as a striker for CSKA Sofia. He also served the club as a manager and head coach. Mladenov's nickname is "Liverpool's Executioner" in honor of his winning goals against the European champion Liverpool F.C. in UEFA European Champions Cup 1/4 finals in season 81/82. Mladenov's finest game as a player was on 17 March 1982, when he scored both of CSKA's goals as they beat Liverpool 2–0 in Sofia to knock the English giants out of the European Cup quarter-finals. He was honoured as Bulgarian Footballer of the Year in 1983. He played also in Portugal in several clubs like V.Setúbal, GD Estoril-Praia, Olhanense, but was in C.F. Os Belenenses where he achieved one third place in Portuguese football league and won a Portuguese Cup beating Benfica in the final, after winning in the prior stages teams like FC Porto and Sporting CP. He was also responsible for the victory that Belenenses had over Barcelona in the UEFA Cup of 1988, when he stole the ball from Barcelona's defender Schuster and made a perfect assist for Mapuata's goal. Nowadays he trains the most successful Bulgarian team CSKA Sofia. Financial problems at his favourite club CSKA Sofia pushed him away after a series of compromises he had done during his time there. He was recently fired as manager of Al-Ettifaq FC after the team failed to win in 4 consecutive games. His son Alexandar Mladenov is a professional footballer. In 2000, he was officially appointed by the Bulgarian Football Union as head coach of Bulgaria. The team eventually finished in third place and was unable to qualify for 2002 FIFA World Cup. He was resigned from national team in 2002. In his initial stint at CSKA Sofia (between 2002 and 2003), Mladenov led the team to its first A PFG title in 6 years. In March 2012, he replaced Dimitar Penev as head coach of CSKA Sofia and led the team to a second-place finish during the 2011/2012 A PFG season.

On 4 January 2013 Stoycho Mladenov was sacked by CSKA Sofia – he was at CSKA Sofia for the third time as manager of the club. On 16 July 2013 Stoycho Mladenov was reappointed by CSKA Sofia – this was his fourth time at CSKA Sofia. He resigned in March 2015 despite the successful season for the team, which was able to pose a challenge to Ludogorets Razgrad for the title. On 20 March 2015, Mladenov officially resigned as manager of CSKA Sofia once again.

In June 2016, Mladenov was appointed as manager of Atyrau.

On 21 November 2016, Mladenov was appointed as manager of FC Kaisar.

On 26 July 2021, Mladenov was appointed as manager of CSKA Sofia. He resigned in April 2022.

== International career ==
Mladenov made 59 appearances for Bulgaria, between 1978 and 1988, and scored 15 goals. He played in four matches for his country at the 1986 FIFA World Cup.

== Personal life ==
His son Stoycho Mladenov Jr. is also a football player and manager.

== Honours ==
=== Player ===
- CSKA Sofia
  - Bulgarian League: 4 times – 1980, 1981, 1982, 1983
  - Bulgarian Cup: 2 times – 1983, 1985
- C.F. Os Belenenses
  - Portuguese Cup: 1 time – 1989

=== Individual ===
- Bulgarian League Top Scorer: 1978 (with 21 goals)

=== Coach ===
- CSKA Sofia
  - Bulgarian League: 2 times – 2003, 2008
- Al-Ahli SC (Jeddah)
  - Gulf Club Champions Cup: 1 times – 2008
- FC Kaisar
  - Kazakhstan Cup (1): 2019

Best Bulgarian football coach – 2019
