= 1982 Bulgarian Cup final =

- Event: 1981–82 Bulgarian Cup
Lokomotiv Sofia	Lokomotiv Plovdiv
A Group	B Group
2	1
- After extra time
- Date: 12 June 1982
- Venue: Slavi Aleksiev Stadium, Pleven
- Referee: Ivan Yosifov (Sofia)
- Attendance: 8,000

The 1982 Bulgarian Cup final was the 42nd final of the Bulgarian Cup (in this period the tournament was named Cup of the Soviet Army), and was contested between Lokomotiv Sofia and Lokomotiv Plovdiv on 12 June 1982 at Slavi Aleksiev Stadium in Pleven. Lokomotiv Sofia won the final 2–1 after extra time.

== Match ==
=== Details ===
12 June 1982

Lokomotiv Sofia	2−1 (a.e.t.)	Lokomotiv Plovdiv
Velichkov 28'; Stoev 109'		Sotirov 57'

Slavi Aleksiev Stadium, Pleven
Attendance: 8,000
Referee: Ivan Yosifov (Sofia)

Lokomotiv Sofia	Lokomotiv Plovdiv

GK	1	(Bulgaria) Nikolay Donev
DF	2	(Bulgaria) Nasko Zhelev
DF	3	(Bulgaria) Ventsislav Arsov
DF	4	(Bulgaria) Aleksandar Markov
DF	5	(Bulgaria) Yordan Stoykov (c)
MF	6	(Bulgaria) Georgi Bonev	(substituted off) 79'
MF	7	(Bulgaria) Angel Kolev
MF	8	(Bulgaria) Traycho Sokolov	(substituted off) 62'
FW	9	(Bulgaria) Boycho Velichkov
MF	10	(Bulgaria) Aleksandar Dudov
MF	11	(Bulgaria) Nako Doychev
Substitutes:
FW	--	(Bulgaria) Boris Iliev	(substituted in) 62'
FW	--	(Bulgaria) Stoycho Stoev	(substituted in) 79'
Manager:
(Bulgaria) Georgi Berkov

GK	1	(Bulgaria) Vasil Gavrailov
DF	2	(Bulgaria) Petyo Vasilev
DF	3	(Bulgaria) Fedya Mikov
DF	4	(Bulgaria) Hristo Kolev	(substituted off) 51'
DF	5	(Bulgaria) Plamen Tanov
MF	6	(Bulgaria) Orlin Kadyov	(substituted off) 91'
FW	7	(Bulgaria) Hristo Sotirov
MF	8	(Bulgaria) Ayan Sadakov (c)
FW	9	(Bulgaria) Eduard Eranosyan
MF	10	(Bulgaria) Georgi Fidanov
MF	11	(Bulgaria) Nikolay Kurbanov
Substitutes:
DF	--	(Bulgaria) Iliya Anchev	(substituted in) 51'
DF	--	(Bulgaria) Petko Stankov	(substituted in) 91'
Manager:
(Bulgaria) Atanas Angelov

== See also ==
- 1981–82 A Group
