= 1975 Bulgarian Cup final =

- Event: 1974–75 Bulgarian Cup
Slavia Sofia	Lokomotiv Sofia
3	2
- Date: 21 June 1975
- Venue: Vasil Levski National Stadium, Sofia
- Referee: Petar Nikolov (Sofia)
- Attendance: 15,000

The 1975 Bulgarian Cup final was the 35th final of the Bulgarian Cup (in this period the tournament was named Cup of the Soviet Army), and was contested between Slavia Sofia and Lokomotiv Sofia on 21 June 1975 at Vasil Levski National Stadium in Sofia. Slavia won the final 3–2.

== Match ==
=== Details ===
21 June 1975

Slavia Sofia	3−2	Lokomotiv Sofia
Zhelyazkov 41', 86', 89'		Arsov 11'; Hadzhiev 81'

Vasil Levski National Stadium, Sofia
Attendance: 15,000
Referee: Petar Nikolov (Sofia)

Slavia	Lokomotiv

GK	1	(Bulgaria) Georgi Gugalov
DF	2	(Bulgaria) Ivan Chakarov
DF	3	(Bulgaria) Lyuben Tasev (c)	Booked
DF	4	(Bulgaria) Milcho Evtimov
DF	5	(Bulgaria) Ivan Iliev
MF	6	(Bulgaria) Vanyo Kostov	(red card) 82'
FW	7	(Bulgaria) Atanas Aleksandrov	Booked
MF	8	(Greece) Kostas Isakidis		(substituted off) 84'
FW	9	(Bulgaria) Andrey Zhelyazkov
MF	10	(Bulgaria) Georgi Minchev	Booked	(substituted off) 82'
FW	11	(Bulgaria) Chavdar Tsvetkov
Substitutes:
FW	--	(Bulgaria) Metodi Bonchev		(substituted in) 82'
FW	--	(Bulgaria) Bozhidar Grigorov		(substituted in) 84'
Manager:
(Bulgaria) Atanas Parzhelov

GK	1	(Bulgaria) Boris Manolkov
DF	2	(Bulgaria) Todor Kolev
DF	3	(Bulgaria) Borislav Dimitrov
DF	4	(Bulgaria) Georgi Bonev
DF	5	(Bulgaria) Yordan Stoykov
MF	6	(Bulgaria) Vasil Petrov
FW	7	(Bulgaria) Trayko Sokolov	Booked	(substituted off) 35'
MF	8	(Bulgaria) Ventsislav Arsov
FW	9	(Bulgaria) Angel Kolev	Booked
FW	10	(Bulgaria) Atanas Mihaylov (c)
MF	11	(Bulgaria) Radoslav Zdravkov
Substitutes:
FW	--	(Bulgaria) Borislav Hadzhiev		(substituted off) 35'
Manager:
(Bulgaria) Yoncho Arsov

== See also ==
- 1974–75 A Group
