= Turkey national football team results (1961–1980) =

This is a list of the Turkey national football team results from 1961 to 1980.

== 1961 ==
14 May 1961 Friendly	Turkey	0 – 1	Romania	(Turkey) 19 Mayıs Stadium, Ankara
		(Report)	72' Dridea	Attendance: 25,969; Referee: (Bulgaria) Dimitar Rumenchev

1 June 1961 1962 WC Q.	Norway	0 – 1	Turkey	(Norway) Ullevaal Stadion, Oslo
		(Report)	16' Oktay	Attendance: 23,416; Referee: (Denmark) Frede Hansen

18 June 1961 1962 WC Q.	Soviet Union	1 – 0	Turkey	(Soviet Union) Central Lenin Stadium, Moscow
	Voronin 20'	http://eu-football.info/_match.php?id=13138 (Report)]		Attendance: 102,000; Referee: (Finland) Martti Hirviniemi

8 October 1961 Friendly	Romania	4 – 0	Turkey	(Romania) 23 August Stadium, Bucharest
	Szeredai 13', 48'; Iliev 73', 74'	(Report)		Attendance: 35,000; Referee: (Italy) Raoul Righi

18 October 1961 Friendly	Turkey	1 – 0	South Korea	(Turkey) 19 Mayıs Stadium, Ankara
	Kutver 66'	(Report)		Attendance: 20,833; Referee: (Turkey) Cezmi Başar

29 October 1961 1962 WC Q.	Turkey	2 – 1	Norway	(Turkey) Mithatpaşa Stadium, Istanbul
	Yelken 60'; Oktay 74'	(Report)	57' Jensen	Attendance: 27,420; Referee: (Romania) Mihai Popa

12 November 1961 1962 WC Q.	Turkey	1 – 2	Soviet Union	(Turkey) Mithatpaşa Stadium, Istanbul
	Oktay 45'	(Report)	12' Gusarov; 18' Mamykin	Attendance: 34,103; Referee: (Israel) Aharon Verner

== 1962 ==
29 April 1962 Friendly	Hungary	2 – 1	Turkey	(Hungary) Népstadion, Budapest
	Solymosi 31'; Göröcs 66'	(Report)	27' Özkarslı	Attendance: 40,000; Referee: (Socialist Federal Republic of Yugoslavia) Živko Bajić

16 May 1962 Friendly	Turkey	1 – 0	Israel	(Turkey) Mithatpaşa Stadium, Istanbul
	Küçükandonyadis 55' (pen.)	(Report)		Attendance: 18,708; Referee: (Socialist Federal Republic of Yugoslavia) Aleksander Škorić

10 October 1962 Friendly	Turkey	3 – 0	Ethiopia	(Turkey) 19 Mayıs Stadium, Ankara
	Oktay 3', 31', 73'	(Report)		Attendance: 17,922; Referee: (Greece) Manolis Panakis

25 November 1962 Friendly	Israel	0 – 2	Turkey	(Israel) National Stadium, Ramat Gan
		(Report)	11', 14' Birol	Attendance: 35,000; Referee: (Greece) Dimosthenis Stathatos

2 December 1962 1964 ENC Q.	Italy	6 – 0	Turkey	(Italy) Stadio Comunale, Bologna
	Rivera 15', 47'; Orlando 22', 29', 35', 85'	(Report)		Attendance: 26,553; Referee: (Belgium) Lucien van Nuffel

12 December 1962 Friendly	Turkey	1 – 1	Denmark	(Turkey) Mithatpaşa Stadium, Istanbul
	Pekel 5'	(Report)	9' Madsen	Attendance: 14,456; Referee: (Socialist Federal Republic of Yugoslavia) Konstantin Zečević

16 December 1962 Friendly	Ethiopia	0 – 0	Turkey	(Ethiopia) Hailé Sélassié Stadium, Addis Ababa
		(Report)		Attendance: ? Referee: (Sudan) Ibrahim Obeid

== 1963 ==
27 March 1963 1964 ENC Q.	Turkey	0 – 1	Italy	(Turkey) Mithatpaşa Stadium, Istanbul
		(Report)	86' Sormani	Attendance: 27,290; Referee: (Bulgaria) Dimitar Rumenchev

22 September 1963 Friendly	Poland	0 – 0	Turkey	(Poland) Stadion im. 22 lipca, Poznań
		(Report)		Attendance: 52,000; Referee: (Austria) Dimitris Wlachojanis

28 September 1963 Friendly	West Germany	3 – 0	Turkey	(West Germany) Waldstadion, Frankfurt
	Seeler 52', 53', 66'	(Report)		Attendance: 47,000; Referee: (Italy) Igino Rigato

9 October 1963 Friendly	Turkey	0 – 0	Romania	(Turkey) 19 Mayıs Stadium, Ankara
		(Report)		Attendance: 29,779; Referee: (Greece) Yiannis Zogas

== 1964 ==
27 September 1964 Friendly	Turkey	2 – 3	Poland	(Turkey) Mithatpaşa Stadium, Istanbul
	Yelken 52'; Oktay 78'	(Report)	8' Lubański; 41' Banaś; 49' Pol	Attendance: 32,149; Referee: (Italy) Francesco Francescon

1 November 1964 Friendly	Turkey	4 – 1	Tunisia	(Turkey) 19 Mayıs Stadium, Ankara
	Yelken 2'; Oktay 19', 65'; Bartu 20'	(Report)	33' Habacha	Attendance: 30,000; Referee: (Romania) Andrei Rădulescu

20 December 1964 Friendly	Turkey	0 – 0	Bulgaria	(Turkey) Ali Sami Yen Stadium, Istanbul
		(Report)		Attendance: 48,600; Referee: (Austria) Alfred Haberfellner

== 1965 ==
24 January 1965 1966 WC Q.	Portugal	5 – 1	Turkey	(Portugal) Estádio Nacional, Lisbon
	Coluna 17'; Eusébio 20', 63', 70'; Graça 52'	(Report)	33' Zemzem	Attendance: 33,237; Referee: (Spain) Juan Gardeazábal Garay

19 April 1965 1966 WC Q.	Turkey	0 – 1	Portugal	(Turkey) 19 Mayıs Stadium, Ankara
		(Report)	59' Eusébio	Attendance: 27,625; Referee: (Syria) Rachid Dachan

2 May 1965 1966 WC Q.	Romania	3 – 0	Turkey	(Romania) Stadionul 23. August, Bucharest
	Georgescu 1'; Mateianu 72' (pen.); Creiniceanu 75'	(Report)		Attendance: 31,219; Referee: (Austria) Paul Schiller

9 May 1965 Friendly	Bulgaria	4 – 1	Turkey	(Bulgaria) Slavia Stadium, Sofia
	Penev 47'; Debarski 24', 71', 83'	(Report)	47' Oktay	Attendance: 23,000; Referee: (Socialist Federal Republic of Yugoslavia) Božidar Botić

21 July 1965 1965 RCD Cup	Pakistan	1 – 3	Turkey	(Iran) Amjadieh Stadium, Tehran
	Saleem 80'	(Report)	5', 32' Altıparmak; 18' Aksel	Attendance: ? Referee: (Iran) Said Sadri

25 July 1965 1965 RCD Cup	Iran	0 – 0	Turkey	(Iran) Amjadieh Stadium, Tehran
		(Report)		Attendance: 27,000; Referee: (Pakistan) Masudur Rahman

9 October 1965 1966 WC Q.	Turkey	0 – 6	Czechoslovakia	(Turkey) Ali Sami Yen Stadium, Istanbul
		(Report)	22', 70' Jokl; 41', 54' Knebort; 45' Kvašňák; 61' Kabát	Attendance: 12,757; Referee: (Italy) Raoul Righi

23 October 1965 1966 WC Q.	Turkey	2 – 1	Romania	(Turkey) 19 Mayıs Stadium, Ankara
	Zemzem 13'; Doğan 48'	(Report)	55' Georgescu	Attendance: 27,364; Referee: (Albania) Ramiz Pregja

21 November 1965 1966 WC Q.	Czechoslovakia	3 – 1	Turkey	(Czechoslovakia) Za Lužánkami, Brno
	Mráz 3', 15'; Horváth 69'	(Report)	8' Elmastaşoğlu	Attendance: 3,133; Referee: (Hungary) Aranyosi Lajos

== 1966 ==
16 March 1966 1965 RCD Cup	Iran	0 – 0	Turkey	(Iran) Amjadieh Stadium, Tehran
		(Report)		Attendance: 27,000; Referee: (Italy) Bruno De Marchi

30 May 1966 Friendly	Denmark	0 – 0	Turkey	(Denmark) Idrætsparken, Copenhagen
		(Report)		Attendance: 27,100; Referee: (Norway) Hans Granlund

12 October 1966 Friendly	Turkey	0 – 2	West Germany	(Turkey) 19 Mayıs Stadium, Ankara
		(Report)	9' Küppers; 78' Rupp	Attendance: 23,944; Referee: (Bulgaria) Dimitar Rumentchev

16 October 1966 Friendly	Soviet Union	0 – 2	Turkey	(Soviet Union) Central Lenin Stadium, Moscow
		(Report)	14' Zemzem; 55' Elmastaşoğlu	Attendance: 40,000; Referee: (Poland) Jan Pawlik

16 November 1966 EURO 68 Q.	Republic of Ireland	2 – 1	Turkey	(Republic of Ireland) Dalymount Park, Dublin
	O'Neill 60'; McEvoy 74'	(Report)	88' Altıparmak	Attendance: 22,480; Referee: (Denmark) Tage Sørensen

== 1967 ==
22 January 1967 Friendly	Tunisia	0 – 0	Turkey	(Tunisia) Stade Chedli Zouiten, Tunis
		(Report)		Attendance: 20,000; Referee: (France) Robert Lacoste

1 February 1967 EURO 68 Q.	Turkey	0 – 0	Spain	(Turkey) Ali Sami Yen Stadium, Istanbul
		(Report)		Attendance: 27,262; Referee: (Hungary) Gere Gyula

22 February 1967 EURO 68 Q.	Turkey	2 – 1	Republic of Ireland	(Turkey) 19 Mayıs Stadium, Ankara
	Elmastaşoğlu 35'; Altıparmak 78'	(Report)	89' Cantwell	Attendance: 31,063; Referee: (Bulgaria) Dimitar Rumentchev

31 May 1967 EURO 68 Q.	Spain	2 – 0	Turkey	(Spain) Estadio San Mamés, Bilbao
	Grosso 63'; Gento 81'	(Report)		Attendance: 27,336; Referee: (Switzerland) Othmar Huber

18 June 1967 EURO 68 Q.	Czechoslovakia	3 – 0	Turkey	(Czechoslovakia) Tehelné Pole, Bratislava
	Adamec 25', 70'; Jurkanin 74'	(Report)		Attendance: 17,839; Referee: (Austria) Paul Schiller

15 November 1967 EURO 68 Q.	Turkey	0 – 0	Czechoslovakia	(Turkey) 19 Mayıs Stadium, Ankara
		(Report)		Attendance: 19,760; Referee: (Romania) Nicolae Mihăilescu

26 November 1967 1967 RCD Cup	Iran	0 – 1	Turkey	(Pakistan) Dacca Stadium, Dhaka
		(Report)	70' Güzelırmak	Attendance: 5,000; Referee: (Pakistan) Isa Khan

28 November 1967 1967 RCD Cup	Pakistan	4 – 7	Turkey	(Pakistan) Dacca Stadium, Dhaka
	Aslam 53'; Jabbar 79', 87', 89'	Report	4', 6' Zemzem; 32', 80' Acuner; 34' Altıparmak; 40' Elmastaşoğlu; 60' Sarıalioğlu	Attendance: 55,000; Referee: (Turkey) Orhan Gönül

== 1968 ==
13 March 1968 Friendly	Turkey	0 – 0	Tunisia	(Turkey) Altay Alsancak Stadium, İzmir
		(Report)		Attendance: 20,000; Referee: (Bulgaria) Mitko Chukov

24 April 1968 Friendly	Poland	8 – 0	Turkey	(Poland) Silesian Stadium, Chorzów
	Faber 5', 55', 63'; Lubański 10', 46', 75'; Bula 62'; Żmijewski 89'	(Report)		Attendance: 17,000; Referee: (East Germany) Günter Männig

9 October 1968 Friendly	Turkey	0 – 2	Bulgaria	(Turkey) Mithatpaşa Stadium, Istanbul
		(Report)	3' Dermendzhiev; 79' Bonev	Attendance: 15,002; Referee: (Switzerland) Anton Bucheli

23 October 1968 1970 WC Q.	Northern Ireland	4 – 1	Turkey	(Northern Ireland) Windsor Park, Belfast
	Best 32'; McMordie 47'; Dougan 66'; W. Campbell 76'	(Report)	9' Altıparmak	Attendance: 38,363; Referee: (Netherlands) Wim Schalks

11 December 1968 1970 WC Q.	Turkey	0 – 3	Northern Ireland	(Turkey) Mithatpaşa Stadium, Istanbul
		(Report)	35', 88' Harkin; 63' Nicholson	Attendance: 21,392; Referee: (Algeria) Zanlin Ben Ganif

== 1969 ==
17 January 1969 Friendly	Saudi Arabia	1 – 2	Turkey	(Saudi Arabia) Al Sayegh Stadium, Riyadh
	Mubarek Al Nasser 70'	(Report)	21' Karadoğan; 42' M. Şen	Attendance: ? Referee: (Saudi Arabia) Abdullah Kaki

30 April 1969 Friendly	Turkey	1 – 3	Poland	(Turkey) 19 Mayıs Stadium, Ankara
	Acuner 84' (pen.)	(Report)	11' Lubański; 22', 61' Wilim	Attendance: 35,006; Referee: (Bulgaria) Gocho Rusev

14 September 1969 1969 RCD Cup	Turkey	4 – 2	Pakistan	(Turkey) 19 Mayıs Stadium, Ankara
	Zemzem 18'; Bartu 43', 65'; Sarıalioğlu 74'	(Report)	8' Aslam; 60' Nawaz	Attendance: ? Referee: (Iran) Ferdi Ali Donal

17 September 1969 1969 RCD Cup	Turkey	4 – 0	Iran	(Turkey) 19 Mayıs Stadium, Ankara
	Konca 12', 29'; Bartu 32'; Kurt 41'	(Report)		Attendance: 40,000; Referee: (Pakistan) Afrar Khan

24 September 1969 Friendly	Turkey	3 – 0	Switzerland	(Turkey) Mithatpaşa Stadium, Istanbul
	Kurt 17'; Yayöz 37'; Bartu 48'	(Report)		Attendance: 28,000; Referee: (Bulgaria) Petar Nikolov

15 October 1969 1970 WC Q.	Soviet Union	3 – 0	Turkey	(Soviet Union) Central Stadium, Kyiv
	Muntyan 43', 78'; Nodia 62'	(Report)		Attendance: 71,115; Referee: (Sweden) Bertil Lööw

16 November 1969 1970 WC Q.	Turkey	1 – 3	Soviet Union	(Turkey) Ali Sami Yen Stadium, Istanbul
	Konca 24'	(Report)	3', 60' Asatiani; 34' Khmelnitsky	Attendance: 29,642; Referee: (Austria) Ferdinand Marschall

== 1970 ==
17 October 1970 Euro 72 Q.	West Germany	1 – 1	Turkey	(West Germany) Müngersdorferstadion, Cologne
	Müller 36' (pen.)	(Report)	16' Yavuz	Attendance: 52,204; Referee: (Malta) Paul Bonett

13 December 1970 Euro 72 Q.	Turkey	2 – 1	Albania	(Turkey) Mithatpaşa Stadium, Istanbul
	Kurt 3'; Turan 43'	(Report)	22' Ziu	Attendance: 39,000; Referee: (Hungary) János Biróczky

== 1971 ==
25 April 1971 Euro 72 Q.	Turkey	0 – 3	West Germany	(Turkey) Mithatpaşa Stadium, Istanbul
		(Report)	43', 47' Müller; 72' Köppel	Attendance: 38,097; Referee: (Soviet Union) Karlo Kruashvili

22 September 1971 Euro 72 Q.	Poland	5 – 1	Turkey	(Poland) Stadion Wisła, Kraków
	Bula 33'; Lubański 62', 73', 90'; Gadocha 69'	(Report)	83' Yayöz	Attendance: 20,241; Referee: (Luxembourg) Antoine Queudeville

26 September 1971 Friendly	Switzerland	4 – 0	Turkey	(Switzerland) Hardturm, Zürich
	Boffi 9'; Odermatt 22'; Künzli 26'; Blättler 27'	(Report)		Attendance: 22,500; Referee: (Austria) Alois Kessler

14 November 1971 Euro 72 Q.	Albania	3 – 0	Turkey	(Albania) Qemal Stafa Stadium, Tirana
	Përnaska 22', 57'; Pano 64'	(Report)		Attendance: 18,159; Referee: (Czech Republic) Iván Pláček

5 December 1971 Euro 72 Q.	Turkey	1 – 0	Poland	(Turkey) Atatürk Stadium, İzmir
	Turan 52'	(Report)		Attendance: 57,794; Referee: (Bulgaria) Petar Nikolov

== 1972 ==
12 April 1972 Friendly	Bulgaria	4 – 2	Turkey	(Bulgaria) Vasil Levski Stadium, Sofia
	Mihaylov 5', 22', 41'; Stankov 89'	(Report)	61' Şengül; 72' Turan	Attendance: 4,000; Referee: (Romania) Mircea Rotaru

4 October 1972 Friendly	Algeria	1 – 0	Turkey	(Algeria) Stade 5 Juillet 1962, Algiers
	Gamouh 49'	(Report)		Attendance: 9,000; Referee: (Tunisia) Hédi Saoudi

22 October 1972 1974 WC Q.	Luxembourg	2 – 0	Turkey	(Luxembourg) Stade de la Frontière, Esch-sur-Alzette
	Dussier 14'; Braun 16'	(Report)		Attendance: 3,960; Referee: (Germany) Karl Riegg

10 December 1972 1974 WC Q.	Turkey	3 – 0	Luxembourg	(Turkey) Mithatpaşa Stadium, Istanbul
	Arpacıoğlu 6', 39'; Mesçi 79' (pen.)	(Report)		Attendance: 36,805; Referee: (Soviet Union) Tofiq Bahramov

== 1973 ==
13 January 1973 1974 WC Q.	Italy	0 – 0	Turkey	(Italy) Stadio San Paolo, Naples
		(Report)		Attendance: 60,815; Referee: (Soviet Union) Karlo Kruashvili

14 February 1973 Friendly	Turkey	4 – 0	Algeria	(Turkey) Atatürk Stadium, İzmir
	Oğuz 7'; Turan 15'; Şengül 64'; Arpacıoğlu 79'	(Report)		Attendance: 20,000; Referee: (Greece) Hristos Kouyias

25 February 1973 1974 WC Q.	Turkey	0 – 1	Italy	(Turkey) Mithatpaşa Stadium, Istanbul
		(Report)	Anastasi 35'	Attendance: 22,990; Referee: (Algeria) Abdelkader Aouissi

18 April 1973 1973–76 Balkan C	Turkey	5 – 2	Bulgaria	(Turkey) Atatürk Stadium, İzmir
	Oğuz 5'; Turan 47', 66', 86'; Kurt 49'	(Report)	39' Panov; 56' Milanov	Attendance: 65,000; Referee: (Greece) Nikos Zlatanos

9 May 1973 1974 WC Q.	Switzerland	0 – 0	Turkey	(Switzerland) St. Jakob Stadium, Basel
		(Report)		Attendance: 50,868; Referee: (Hungary) Emsberger Gyula

17 October 1973 Friendly	Turkey	0 – 0	Spain	(Turkey) İnönü Stadium, Istanbul
		(Report)		Attendance: 12,678; Referee: (Bulgaria) Nikola Dudin

18 November 1973 1974 WC Q.	Turkey	2 – 0	Switzerland	(Turkey) Atatürk Stadium, İzmir
	Türkkan 51'; Atacan 54'	(Report)		Attendance: 67,126; Referee: (Scotland) Bobby Davidson

== 1974 ==
18 January 1974 1974 RCD Cup	Pakistan	2 – 2	Turkey	(Pakistan) Hockey Club Stadium, Karachi
	Sarwar 45' (pen.); Nawaz 85'	(Report)	Atacan 8'; Yalman 49'	Attendance: ? Referee: (Iran) Mohsen Zamani

20 January 1974 1974 RCD Cup	Iran	0 – 1	Turkey	(Pakistan) Hockey Club Stadium, Karachi
	Sarwar 45' (pen.); Idrees 85'	(Report)	8', 49' Atacan	Attendance: ? Referee: (Iran) Mohsen Zamani

8 May 1974 1973–76 Balkan C	Bulgaria	5 – 1	Turkey	(Bulgaria) Vasil Levski Stadium, Sofia
	Bonev 12'; Kovis 47' (o.g.); Zhechev 67'; Panov 76'; Grigorov 79'	(Report)	68' Turan	Attendance: 25,000; Referee: (Romania) Kevork Ghemigean

13 November 1974 Friendly	Turkey	0 – 1	Austria	(Turkey) İnönü Stadium, Istanbul
		(Report)	4' Stering	Attendance: 30,978; Referee: (Romania) Nicolae Petriceanu

20 November 1974 Euro 76 Q.	Turkey	1 – 1	Republic of Ireland	(Turkey) Atatürk Stadium, İzmir
	Martin 54' (o.g.)	(Report)	61' Givens	Attendance: 69,999; Referee: (Poland) Marian Srodecki

1 December 1974 Euro 76 Q.	Turkey	2 – 1	Switzerland	(Turkey) Atatürk Stadium, İzmir
	İsmail 28'; M. Oğuz 85'	(Report)	18' Schild	Attendance: 46,564; Referee: (Socialist Federal Republic of Yugoslavia) Milivoje Gugulović

== 1975 ==
19 March 1975 Friendly	Turkey	1 – 1	Romania	(Turkey) İnönü Stadium, Istanbul
	Turan 3'	(Report)	7' Lucescu	Attendance: 22,005; Referee: (Austria) Werner Spiegel

2 April 1975 Euro 76 Q.	Soviet Union	3 – 0	Turkey	(Soviet Union) Kyiv Central Stadium, Kyiv
	Kolotov 25' (pen.), 56' (pen.); Blokhin 75'	(Report)		Attendance: 74,223; Referee: (Scotland) Bobby Davidson

30 April 1975 Euro 76 Q.	Switzerland	1 – 1	Turkey	(Switzerland) Hardturm Stadion, Zürich
	Müller 43'	(Report)	53' Eratlı	Attendance: 21,965; Referee: (Italy) Riccardo Lattanzi

12 October 1975 Friendly	Romania	2 – 2	Turkey	(Romania) Stadionul 23 August, Bucharest
	Iordănescu 23'; Dinu 90'	(Report)	14' Özdenak; 80' Turan	Attendance: 5,000; Referee: (Poland) Marian Kustoń

29 October 1975 Euro 76 Q.	Republic of Ireland	4 – 0	Turkey	(Republic of Ireland) Dalymount Park, Dublin
	Givens 25', 28', 34', 88'	(Report)		Attendance: 23,000; Referee: (Spain) Ángel Franco Martínez

23 November 1975 Euro 76 Q.	Turkey	1 – 0	Soviet Union	(Turkey) Atatürk Stadium, İzmir
	Reshko 22' (o.g.)	(Report)		Attendance: 21,325; Referee: (Bulgaria) Petar Nikolov

20 December 1975 Friendly	Turkey	0 – 5	West Germany	(Turkey) İnönü Stadium, Istanbul
		(Report)	18', 77' Heynckes; 25' Beer; 57', 65' Worm	Attendance: 19,901; Referee: (Italy) Alberto Michelotti

== 1976 ==
8 February 1976 Friendly	Iraq	0 – 0	Turkey	(Iraq) Al-Shaab Stadium, Baghdad
		(Report)		Attendance: 30,000; Referee: (Iraq) Abdel Vasab

25 August 1976 Friendly	Finland	2 – 1	Turkey	(Finland) Olympic Stadium, Helsinki
	Heiskanen 37'; Paatelainen 81'	(Report)	61' Kaynak	Attendance: 5,210; Referee: (Sweden) Sven Jonsson

22 September 1976 Friendly	Bulgaria	2 – 2	Turkey	(Bulgaria) Vasil Levski National Stadium, Sofia
	Bonev 10'; Zhelyazkov 42'	(Report)	56' (o.g.) Ivkov; 85' Denizci	Attendance: 12,000; Referee: (Socialist Federal Republic of Yugoslavia) Vlado Tauzes

13 October 1976 Friendly	Turkey	3 – 3	Republic of Ireland	(Turkey) 19 Mayıs Stadium, Ankara
	Turan 51', 70'; Ertürk 65'	(Report)	3' Stapleton; 14' Daly; 80' Waters	Attendance: 28,000; Referee: (Socialist Federal Republic of Yugoslavia) Miloš Kajić

31 October 1976 1978 WC Q.	Turkey	4 – 0	Malta	(Turkey) Atatürk Stadium, İzmir
	Özgül 22'; Turan 54', 57', 75'	(Report)		Attendance: 68,034; Referee: (Czech Republic) Michal Jursa

17 November 1976 1978 WC Q.	East Germany	1 – 1	Turkey	(East Germany) Dynamo-Stadion, Dresden
	Kotte 3' (pen.)	(Report)	31' (pen.) Turan	Attendance: 18,000; Referee: (England) Pat Partridge

== 1977 ==
16 February 1977 1977-80 Balkan C	Turkey	2 – 0	Bulgaria	(Turkey) İnönü Stadium, Istanbul
	Denizci 54'; Turan 55'	(Report)		Attendance: 37,055; Referee: (Socialist Federal Republic of Yugoslavia) Velibor Ljujić

23 March 1977 1977-80 Balkan C	Romania	4 – 0	Turkey	(Romania) Stadionul Steaua, Bucharest
	Georgescu 23'; Dumitru 62'; Vigu 75'; Iordănescu 82'	(Report)		Attendance: 10,000; Referee: (Greece) Panayotis Kolliropoulos

6 April 1977 Friendly	Turkey	1 – 2	Finland	(Turkey) 19 Mayıs Stadium, Ankara
	Denizli 23'	(Report)	64' Paatelainen; 76' Nieminen	Attendance: 45,000; Referee: (Romania) Otto Anderco

17 April 1977 1978 WC Q.	Austria	1 – 0	Turkey	(Austria) Praterstadion, Vienna
	Schachner 43'	(Report)		Attendance: 60,100; Referee: (Soviet Union) Viktor Zharkov

7 September 1977 Friendly	Czechoslovakia	1 – 0	Turkey	(Czechoslovakia) Tehelné pole, Bratislava
	Gajdůšek 2'	(Report)		Attendance: 20,000; Referee: (Netherlands) Gerrit Berrevoets

21 September 1977 1977-80 Balkan C	Bulgaria	3 – 1	Turkey	(Bulgaria) Vasil Levski National Stadium, Sofia
	Zhelyazkov 27'; Dzhevizov 28'; Aleksandrov 86' (pen.)	(Report)	8' Özden	Attendance: 18,000; Referee: (Greece) Dimitris Sarakinos

30 October 1977 1978 WC Q.	Turkey	0 – 1	Austria	(Turkey) Atatürk Stadium, İzmir
		(Report)	72' Prohaska	Attendance: 69,360; Referee: (Scotland) John Gordon

16 November 1977 1978 WC Q.	Turkey	1 – 2	East Germany	(Turkey) Atatürk Stadium, İzmir
	Yayım 81'	(Report)	30' Schade; 62' Hoffmann	Attendance: 7,010; Referee: (Italy) Alberto Michelotti

27 November 1977 1978 WC Q.	Malta	0 – 3	Turkey	(Malta) Empire Stadium, Gżira
		(Report)	21', 48' Özden; 36' Turan	Attendance: 2,246; Referee: (Morocco) Mohamed Larache

== 1978 ==
22 March 1978 1977-80 Balkan C	Turkey	1 – 1	Romania	(Turkey) İnönü Stadium, Istanbul
	Özden 10'	(Report)	80' Georgescu	Attendance: 10,000; Referee: (Socialist Federal Republic of Yugoslavia) Toma Manojlovski

5 April 1978 Friendly	Republic of Ireland	4 – 2	Turkey	(Republic of Ireland) Lansdowne Road, Dublin
	Giles 26'; McGee 12'; Treacy 18', 23'	(Report)	55' Mustafaoğlu; 61' Turan	Attendance: 10,000; Referee: (Scotland) Hugh Alexander

23 September 1978 Friendly	Italy	1 – 0	Turkey	(Italy) Stadio Comunale, Florence
16:30 CEST (UTC+02:00)	Graziani 26'	(Report)		Attendance: 40,000; Referee: (Portugal) António Garrido

5 October 1978 Friendly	Turkey	0 – 2	Soviet Union	(Turkey) 19 Mayıs Stadium, Ankara
		(Report)	37' Gutsaev; 41' Blokhin	Attendance: 45,000; Referee: (Italy) Alberto Michelotti

29 November 1978 Euro 80 Q.	Wales	1 – 0	Turkey	(Wales) Racecourse Ground, Wrexham
	Deacy 70'	(Report)		Attendance: 11,794; Referee: (Poland) Alojzy Jarguz

== 1979 ==
28 February 1979 Friendly	Turkey	0 – 1	Algeria	(Turkey) Atatürk Stadium, Bursa
		(Report)	76' Guemri	Attendance: 15,644; Referee: (Romania) Constantin Ghiță

18 March 1979 Euro 80 Q.	Turkey	2 – 1	Malta	(Turkey) Atatürk Stadium, İzmir
	Özden 34'; Terim 56'	(Report)	Spiteri-Gonzi 52'	Attendance: 34,154; Referee: (Socialist Federal Republic of Yugoslavia) Tome Manojlovski

1 April 1979 Euro 80 Q.	Turkey	0 – 0	West Germany	(Turkey) Atatürk Stadium, İzmir
		(Report)		Attendance: 68,000; Referee: (Soviet Union) Myroslav Stupar

28 October 1979 Euro 80 Q.	Malta	1 – 2	Turkey	(Malta) Empire Stadium, Gżira
	Farrugia 62'	(Report)	20' Özden; 25' Denizli	Attendance: 1,976; Referee: (Italy) Gianfranco Menegali

21 November 1979 Euro 80 Q.	Turkey	1 – 0	Wales	(Turkey) Atatürk Stadium, İzmir
	Önal 80'	(Report)		Attendance: 30,650; Referee: (Romania) Constantin Ghita

22 December 1979 Euro 80 Q.	West Germany	2 – 0	Turkey	(West Germany) Parkstadion, Gelsenkirchen
	Fischer 15'; Zimmermann 89'	(Report)		Attendance: 70,000; Referee: (Switzerland) Rudolf Renggli

== 1980 ==
24 September 1980 1982 WC Q.	Turkey	1 – 3	Iceland	(Turkey) Atatürk Stadium, İzmir
	Terim 72' (pen.)	(Report)	12' Gudlaugsson; 62' A. Gudmundsson; 80' T. Þórðarson	Attendance: 18,506; Referee: (Romania) Ioan Igna

1 October 1980 Islamic Games	Turkey	1 – 2	Libya	(Turkey) Atatürk Stadium, İzmir
	Gürbüz 24'	(Report)	35' Abdulnaser Ezzeddin; 44' (pen.) Mohamed Ali Omar Lagha	Attendance: ? Referee: (Saudi Arabia) Fahad Al Dehmash

3 October 1980 Islamic Games	Turkey	3 – 0	Saudi Arabia	(Turkey) Atatürk Stadium, İzmir
	Soyak 2'; Al-Nu'eimeh 34' (o.g.); Bilgetay 80'	(Report)		Attendance: 5,591; Referee: (Malaysia) Zayn Al Abidin Alaadin

5 October 1980 Islamic Games	Turkey	3 – 0	Malaysia	(Turkey) Atatürk Stadium, İzmir
	Yıldız 33'; Soyak 66', 86'			Attendance: ? Referee: (Saudi Arabia) Musaid Al Saeed

15 October 1980 1982 WC Q.	Wales	4 – 0	Turkey	(Wales) Ninian Park, Cardiff
	Flynn 19'; L. James 37' (pen.), 85'; Walsh 79'	(Report)		Attendance: 11,770; Referee: (Denmark) Torben Månsson

3 December 1980 1982 WC Q.	Czechoslovakia	2 – 0	Turkey	(Czechoslovakia) Stadion Evžena Rošického, Prague
	Nehoda 13', 15'	(Report)		Attendance: 8,500; Referee: (Sweden) Erik Fredriksson

== Other unofficial games ==
5 January 1977 Friendly	Northern Cyprus	0–1	Turkey	(Northern Cyprus) 20 Temmuz Stadium, Kyrenia
		(Report)	Hayri Gökmen 73'	Referee: (Turkey) Onur Kanatlı

28 September 1980 Islamic Games	Turkey	5–0	Northern Cyprus	(Turkey) Atatürk Stadium, İzmir
	Bali 18'; Bilgetay 31'; Yıldız 54'; Gürbüz 66'; Ergün 74'	(Report)		Referee: (Malaysia) Zayn Al Abidin Alaadin
