= 1977–78 A Group =

34th season of top-tier football league in Bulgaria

A Group
- Season: 1977–78
- Champions: Lokomotiv Sofia (4th title)
- Relegated: Spartak Varna; Akademik Svishtov
- European Cup: Lokomotiv Sofia
- UEFA Cup: CSKA; Levski; Botev Plovdiv
- Matches played: 240
- Goals scored: 623 (2.6 per match)
- Top goalscorer: Stoycho Mladenov (21 goals)

The 1977–78 A Group was the 30th season of the A Football Group, the top Bulgarian professional league for association football clubs, since its establishment in 1948.

== Overview ==
It was contested by 16 teams, and Lokomotiv Sofia won the championship which became the team’s fourth title overall.

== League standings ==
Pos	Team	Pld	W	D	L	GF	GA	GD	Pts	Qualification or relegation
1	Lokomotiv Sofia (C)	30	16	10	4	40	16	+24	42	Qualification for European Cup first round
2	CSKA Sofia	30	18	5	7	60	35	+25	41	Qualification for UEFA Cup first round
3	Levski Sofia	30	15	8	7	53	30	+23	38	Qualification for UEFA Cup first round
4	Botev Plovdiv	30	13	6	11	39	36	+3	32	Qualification for UEFA Cup first round
5	Slavia Sofia	30	12	6	12	54	35	+19	30	
6	Beroe Stara Zagora	30	12	5	13	37	37	0	29	
7	Pirin Blagoevgrad	30	12	5	13	32	40	−8	29	
8	Akademik Sofia	30	10	8	12	34	38	−4	28	
9	Cherno More Varna	30	8	12	10	27	34	−7	28	
10	Chernomorets Burgas	30	11	5	14	44	43	+1	27	
11	Lokomotiv Plovdiv	30	11	5	14	33	41	−8	27	
12	Sliven	30	11	5	14	36	51	−15	27	
13	Botev Vratsa	30	11	5	14	31	56	−25	27	
14	Marek Dupnitsa	30	11	4	15	37	40	−3	26	Qualification for Cup Winners' Cup first round
15	Spartak Varna (R)	30	11	3	16	30	46	−16	25	Relegation to 1978–79 B Group
16	Akademik Svishtov (R)	30	9	6	15	36	45	−9	24	Relegation to 1978–79 B Group

Source: rsssf.com
(C) Champions; (R) Relegated

== Results ==
Home \ Away	ASF	ASV	BSZ	BPD	BVR	CHM	CHB	CSK	LEV	LPL	LSO	MAR	PIR	SLA	SLI	SPV
Akademik Sofia		1–0	2–0	4–0	1–2	2–1	3–2	2–4	0–0	6–1	1–0	1–0	0–0	0–6	2–4	1–0
Akademik Svishtov	3–2		2–3	1–1	4–0	1–0	1–0	2–0	1–0	0–0	0–0	3–2	1–1	1–2	3–0	5–1
Beroe Stara Zagora	0–1	2–1		3–2	3–0	0–0	2–0	0–1	2–1	3–1	2–1	2–1	4–0	1–0	2–1	0–1
Botev Plovdiv	1–1	3–0	0–0		2–0	3–2	3–1	1–0	4–1	1–0	0–0	1–0	2–0	1–0	1–1	1–0
Botev Vratsa	1–0	1–0	2–0	3–2		0–0	3–1	1–1	0–0	4–2	0–0	2–0	2–1	2–1	2–2	1–0
Cherno More	0–0	1–0	1–1	1–0	3–0		1–1	1–3	1–1	0–0	0–0	1–1	1–1	1–0	3–0	0–0
Chernomorets Burgas	2–0	0–0	1–0	1–1	5–0	3–0		2–1	1–2	3–2	2–2	2–0	2–0	2–1	3–0	4–1
CSKA Sofia	1–1	2–0	2–1	3–2	5–2	3–1	2–1		2–2	4–1	0–1	2–1	4–0	4–0	3–1	3–0
Levski Sofia	1–0	3–1	0–0	2–1	5–0	4–0	2–1	4–1		3–0	1–2	3–2	3–1	3–0	1–0	4–1
Lokomotiv Plovdiv	2–1	0–0	0–0	0–1	2–0	5–0	2–0	3–0	0–0		2–0	1–0	1–0	1–0	5–0	1–0
Lokomotiv Sofia	0–0	5–1	3–1	1–0	1–0	1–0	1–0	0–0	3–3	1–0		3–0	4–0	2–1	2–0	3–0
Marek Dupnitsa	1–1	4–2	2–0	2–1	1–0	1–1	2–1	1–3	1–0	4–1	1–1		3–1	1–0	3–1	2–0
Pirin Blagoevgrad	1–0	5–1	1–0	2–1	4–1	1–0	3–0	2–4	1–0	2–0	0–2	1–0		0–0	1–0	1–1
Slavia Sofia	1–1	2–1	4–3	3–0	6–2	0–2	4–0	1–0	1–1	6–0	0–0	1–0	0–1		8–1	3–1
Sliven	2–0	1–0	3–1	3–1	3–0	1–3	1–1	0–0	1–3	1–0	0–1	3–1	1–0	1–1		3–0
Spartak Varna	2–0	3–1	3–1	1–2	1–0	1–2	3–2	1–2	2–0	1–0	1–0	1–0	2–1	2–2	0–1	

Source: A PFG (in Bulgarian)
Legend: Blue = home team win; Yellow = draw; Red = away team win.

== Champions ==
Lokomotiv Sofia

Goalkeepers
(Bulgaria) Rumyancho Goranov	24	(0)
(Bulgaria) Nikolay Donev	7	(0)
(Bulgaria) Vasil Elenkov	1	(0)

Defenders
(Bulgaria) Boko Dimitrov	29	(0)
(Bulgaria) Sasho Kostov	14	(0)
(Bulgaria) Nasko Zhelev	1	(0)
(Bulgaria) Georgi Bonev	29	(0)
(Bulgaria) Yordan Stoykov	29	(1)
(Bulgaria) Georgi Stefanov	29	(0)

Midfielders
(Bulgaria) Angel Kolev	28	(8)
(Bulgaria) Valentin Svilenov	10	(0)
(Bulgaria) Radoslav Zdravkov	22	(2)
(Bulgaria) Ventsislav Arsov	30	(4)
(Bulgaria) Lyuben Traykov	24	(3)
(Bulgaria) Traycho Sokolov	26	(5)

Forwards
(Bulgaria) Boycho Velichkov	22	(5)
(Bulgaria) Nikola Spasov	13	(0)
(Bulgaria) Atanas Mihaylov	27	(11)
(Bulgaria) Rumen Manolov	6	(0)

Manager
(Bulgaria) Vasil Metodiev

== Top scorers ==
Rank	Scorer	Club	Goals
1	(Bulgaria) Stoycho Mladenov	Beroe Stara Zagora	21
2	(Bulgaria) Andrey Zhelyazkov	Slavia Sofia	18
3	(Bulgaria) Georgi Minchev	Slavia Sofia	16
4	(Bulgaria) Anton Milkov	Botev Plovdiv	14
5	(Bulgaria) Ivan Petrov	Marek Dupnitsa	13
6	(Bulgaria) Spas Dzhevizov	CSKA Sofia	12
7	(Bulgaria) Atanas Mihaylov	Lokomotiv Sofia	11
7	(Bulgaria) Krasimir Manolov	Akademik Sofia	11
7	(Bulgaria) Georgi Todorov	Levski Sofia	11
10	(Bulgaria) Yordan Yordanov	Levski Sofia	10
10	(Bulgaria) Sasho Angelov	Botev Vratsa	10
10	(Bulgaria) Yordan Hristov	Sliven	10
10	(Bulgaria) Sasho Momchilov	Akademik Svishtov	10
