= 1977–80 Balkan Cup =

Tournament details
- Dates: 16 February 1977 – 27 August 1980
- Teams: 5

Final positions
- Champions: Romania (4th title)
- Runners-up: Yugoslavia

Tournament statistics
- Matches played: 10
- Goals scored: 28 (2.8 per match)
- Top goal scorer(s): (Romania) Anghel Iordănescu (6 goals)

The 1977–80 Balkan Cup, was the 12th Balkan Cup football tournament. It was the first to have a group stage involving the five teams split into two groups, one of three teams and the other of two, with the winner of each one meeting in the final. It was played between February 1977 and August 1980 between Turkey, Romania, Bulgaria, Yugoslavia and Greece. The tournament was won by Romania with the aggregate score of 4–3 against Yugoslavia in the two-legged final. The top goalscorer was Anghel Iordănescu from Romania with 6 goals.

== Group stage ==
=== Group 1 ===
Pos	Team	Pld	W	D	L	GF	GA	GR	Pts	Qualification
1	Romania	4	2	2	0	8	2	4.000	6	Final
2	Bulgaria	4	1	1	2	4	6	0.667	3	
3	Turkey	4	1	1	2	4	8	0.500	3	

Romania qualified for the final.

=== Matches ===
16 February 1977

Turkey	2–0	Bulgaria
Denizci 54'; Turan 55'	Report

İnönü Stadium, Istanbul
Attendance: 37,055
Referee: Velibor Ljujić (Yugoslavia)

23 March 1977

Romania	4–0	Turkey
Georgescu 23'; Dumitru 62'; Vigu 75'; Iordănescu 82'	Report

Stadionul Steaua, Bucharest
Attendance: 10,000
Referee: Panayotis Kolliropoulos (Greece)

21 September 1977

Bulgaria	3–1	Turkey
Zhelyazkov 27'; Dzhevizov 28'; Aleksandrov 86' (pen.)	Report	Özden 8'

Vasil Levski National Stadium, Sofia
Attendance: 18,000
Referee: Dimitris Sarakinos (Greece)

22 March 1978

Turkey	1–1	Romania
Özden 10'	Report	Georgescu 80'

İnönü Stadium, Istanbul
Attendance: 10,000
Referee: Tome Manojlovski (Yugoslavia)

5 May 1978

Romania	2–0	Bulgaria
Iordănescu 2'; Balaci 74'	Report

Stadionul 23 August, Bucharest
Attendance: 30,000
Referee: Vlado Tauzes (Yugoslavia)

31 May 1978

Bulgaria	1–1	Romania
Mladenov 16'	Report	Iordănescu 34'

Vasil Levski National Stadium, Sofia
Attendance: 10,000
Referee: Dimitris Sarakinos (Greece)

=== Group 2 ===
Pos	Team	Pld	W	D	L	GF	GA	GR	Pts	Qualification
1	Yugoslavia	2	1	1	0	4	1	4.000	3	Final
2	Greece	2	0	1	1	1	4	0.250	1	

Yugoslavia qualified for the final.

=== Matches ===
16 November 1977

Greece	0–0	Yugoslavia
	Report

Stadium Charilaou, Thessaloniki
Attendance: 18,000
Referee: Boris Trendafilov (Bulgaria)

15 November 1978

Yugoslavia	4–1	Greece
Halilhodžić 33', 58', 84' (pen.); Savić 48'	Report	Mavros 32'

Gradski Stadion, Skopje
Attendance: 12,000
Referee: Bogdan Dochev (Bulgaria)

== Final ==
Team 1	Agg.	Team 2	1st leg	2nd leg
Yugoslavia (Socialist Federal Republic of Yugoslavia)	3–4	Romania	2–0	1–4

=== First leg ===
30 March 1980

Yugoslavia	2–0	Romania
Krstičević 35'; Sušić 61'	Report

Omladinski Stadium, Belgrade
Attendance: 7,000
Referee: Nihat Özbirgül (Turkey)

=== Second leg ===
27 August 1980

Romania	4–1	Yugoslavia
Iordănescu 21', 55' (pen.), 79' (pen.); Cămătaru 26'	Report	Sušić 73' (pen.)

Stadionul 23 August, Bucharest
Attendance: 25,000
Referee: Antonis Vasaras (Greece)

== Winner ==
1977-80 Balkan Cup

Romania
Fourth title

== Statistics ==
=== Goalscorers ===
There were 28 goals scored in 10 matches, for an average of 2.8 goals per match.

6 goals

- (Romania) Anghel Iordănescu

3 goals

- (Socialist Federal Republic of Yugoslavia) Vahid Halilhodžić

2 goals

- (Socialist Federal Republic of Yugoslavia) Safet Sušić
- (Romania) Dudu Georgescu
- (Turkey) Sedat Özden

1 goal

- (Bulgaria) Andrey Zhelyazkov
- (Bulgaria) Spas Dzhevizov
- (Bulgaria) Atanas Aleksandrov
- (Bulgaria) Stoycho Mladenov
- (Greece) Thomas Mavros
- (Socialist Federal Republic of Yugoslavia) Dušan Savić
- (Socialist Federal Republic of Yugoslavia) Mišo Krstičević
- (Romania) Ilie Balaci
- (Romania) Ion Dumitru
- (Romania) Iosif Vigu
- (Romania) Rodion Cămătaru
- (Turkey) Ali Kemal Denizci
- (Turkey) Cemil Turan
