= 1974–75 Bulgarian Cup =

Tournament details
- Country: Bulgaria

Final positions
- Champions: Slavia Sofia (5th cup)
- Runners-up: Lokomotiv Sofia

Tournament statistics
- Top goal scorer(s): A. Zhelyazkov (Slavia) (7 goals)

The 1974–75 Bulgarian Cup was the 35th season of the Bulgarian Cup (in this period the tournament was named Cup of the Soviet Army). Slavia Sofia won the competition, beating Lokomotiv Sofia 3–2 in the final at the Vasil Levski National Stadium.

== Preliminary round ==
Team 1	Score	Team 2
1974
Bdin Vidin	3–1	FC Levski
Dobrudzha Dobrich	2–0	Benkovski Isperih
Metalurg Pernik	3–0	Montana
Energiya Targovishte	0–1	Lokomotiv Mezdra
Tundzha Yambol	2–0	Svilengrad
Hadzhi Dimitar Sliven	1–2	Hebar Pazardzhik
Arda Kardzhali	1–0	Maritsa Plovdiv
Dorostol Silistra	2–0	FC Kremikovtsi
Chavdar Troyan	4–2	Nesebar
Shumen	2–0	Velbazhd Kyustendil
Rodopa Smolyan	5–1	Belasitsa Petrich
Slivnishki Geroy	3–0	Lokomotiv Ruse

== First round ==
Team 1	Score	Team 2
15/22 December 1974
Lokomotiv Plovdiv	2–0	Shumen
Tundzha Yambol	1–0	Yantra Gabrovo
Sliven	2–1	Slivnishki Geroy
Rakovski Sevlievo	1–2	Slavia Sofia
Spartak Pleven	3–2	Metalurg Pernik
Chavdar Troyan	0–2	Etar Veliko Tarnovo
Minyor Pernik	1–0	Arda Kardzhali
Beloslav	1–0	Dunav Ruse
Cherno More Varna	4–1	Akademik Svishtov
Dorostol Silistra	0–1	Botev Plovdiv
Bdin Vidin	1–0	Pirin Blagoevgrad
Akademik Sofia	3–0	Rodopa Smolyan
Lokomotiv Sofia	2–0	Hebar Pazardzhik
Botev Vratsa	3–0	Lokomotiv Mezdra
Levski Sofia	1–0	Beroe Stara Zagora
Dobrudzha Dobrich	1–2	CSKA Sofia

== Group stage ==
=== Group 1 ===
Matches were played in Septemvri, Peshtera, Panagyurishte, Pazardzhik and Velingrad

Team 1	Score	Team 2
22 February–1 March 1975
Slavia Sofia	1–1	Minyor Pernik
Botev Plovdiv	2–1	Tundzha Yambol
Slavia Sofia	3–1	Botev Plovdiv
Minyor Pernik	0–3	Tundzha Yambol
Botev Plovdiv	3–0	Minyor Pernik
Tundzha Yambol	0–0	Slavia Sofia

Pos	Team	Pld	W	D	L	GF	GA	GD	Pts	Qualification
1	Slavia Sofia	3	1	2	0	4	2	+2	4	Quarter-finals
2	Botev Plovdiv	3	2	0	1	6	4	+2	4	Quarter-finals
3	Tundzha Yambol	3	1	1	1	4	2	+2	3	
4	Minyor Pernik	3	0	1	2	1	7	−6	1	

=== Group 2 ===
Matches were played in Kazanlak, Nova Zagora, Chirpan and Stara Zagora

Team 1	Score	Team 2
22 February–1 March 1975
Akademik Sofia	1–3	Spartak Pleven
Levski Sofia	3–0	Bdin Vidin
Spartak Pleven	2–3	Bdin Vidin
Akademik Sofia	1–2	Levski Sofia
Bdin Vidin	0–2	Akademik Sofia
Levski Sofia	1–1	Spartak Pleven

Pos	Team	Pld	W	D	L	GF	GA	GD	Pts	Qualification
1	Levski Sofia	3	2	1	0	6	2	+4	5	Quarter-finals
2	Spartak Pleven	3	1	1	1	6	5	+1	3	Quarter-finals
3	Akademik Sofia	3	1	0	2	4	5	−1	2	
4	Bdin Vidin	3	1	0	2	3	7	−4	2	

=== Group 3 ===
Matches were played in Harmanli, Dimitrovgrad, Simeonovgrad and Parvomay

Team 1	Score	Team 2
22 February–1 March 1975
Lokomotiv Plovdiv	0–0	Cherno More Varna
Sliven	0–0	Lokomotiv Sofia
Cherno More Varna	1–1	Lokomotiv Sofia
Lokomotiv Plovdiv	2–2	Sliven
Sliven	1–1	Cherno More Varna
Lokomotiv Sofia	2–1	Lokomotiv Plovdiv

Pos	Team	Pld	W	D	L	GF	GA	GD	Pts	Qualification
1	Lokomotiv Sofia	3	1	2	0	3	2	+1	4	Quarter-finals
2	Sliven	3	0	3	0	3	3	0	3	Quarter-finals
3	Cherno More Varna	3	0	3	0	2	2	0	3	
4	Lokomotiv Plovdiv	3	0	2	1	3	4	−1	2	

=== Group 4 ===
Matches were played in Gotse Delchev, Simitli, Blagoevgrad and Bansko

Team 1	Score	Team 2
22 February–1 March 1975
CSKA Sofia	1–0	Etar Veliko Tarnovo
Botev Vratsa	1–1	Beloslav
Etar Veliko Tarnovo	3–2	Beloslav
CSKA Sofia	1–0	Botev Vratsa
Botev Vratsa	3–0	Etar Veliko Tarnovo
Beloslav	0–1	CSKA Sofia

Pos	Team	Pld	W	D	L	GF	GA	GD	Pts	Qualification
1	CSKA Sofia	3	3	0	0	3	0	+3	6	Quarter-finals
2	Botev Vratsa	3	1	1	1	4	2	+2	3	Quarter-finals
3	Etar Veliko Tarnovo	3	1	0	2	3	6	−3	2	
4	Beloslav	3	0	1	2	3	5	−2	1	

== Quarter-finals ==
Team 1	Score	Team 2	Place
19 March 1975
Slavia Sofia	2–0	Sliven	Plovdiv
CSKA Sofia	4–1	Spartak Pleven	Montana
Lokomotiv Sofia	3–1	Botev Plovdiv	Stara Zagora
Botev Vratsa	0–0 (a.e.t.) (5–4 p)	Levski Sofia	Lovech

== Semi-finals ==
Team 1	Score	Team 2	Place
14 May 1975
Slavia Sofia	2–0 (a.e.t.)	CSKA Sofia	Sofia
Lokomotiv Sofia	2–0	Botev Vratsa	Gorna Oryahovitsa

== Final ==
=== Details ===
21 June 1975

Slavia Sofia	3−2	Lokomotiv Sofia
Zhelyazkov 41', 86', 89'		Arsov 11'; Hadzhiev 81'

Vasil Levski National Stadium, Sofia
Attendance: 15,000
Referee: Petar Nikolov (Sofia)

Slavia	Lokomotiv
