= 1945 Bulgarian Republic Football Championship =

1st season of top-tier football league in Bulgaria

Bulgarian Republic Football Championship
- Season: 1945
- Champions: Lokomotiv Sofia

The 1945 Republic Football Championship was a national football competition in Bulgaria. From 1945 to 1948, the Bulgarian Republic Football Championship was the successor of the Bulgarian State Football Championship.

== Overview ==
The 1945 season was contested by 24 teams, and Lokomotiv Sofia won the championship. As Bulgaria had lost the territories of Vardar Macedonia, Western Thrace and parts of Greek Macedonia that it administered during most of World War II, teams from those regions no longer took part in the Bulgarian championships, beginning in 1945.

== First round ==
Team 1	Score	Team 2
Botev Byala Slatina	2–3 (a.e.t.)	ZhSK-Botev Pleven
Orlovets Gabrovo	1–0	Hadzhi Slavchev Pavlikeni
Borislav Borisovgrad	3–3 (a.e.t.)	ZhSK Stara Zagora
Botev Mihaylovgrad	0–1	Benkovski Vidin
Botev Gorna Dzhumaya	3–1	Lokomotiv Pernik
Levski-Dorostol Silistra	0–2	Angel Kanchev-Levski Ruse
Nikolay Laskov Yambol	2–1	Slavia Burgas
Levski Sofia	4–0	ZhSK-Levski Plovdiv
Replay
Borislav Borisovgrad	1–0	ZhSK Stara Zagora

== Second round ==
Team 1	Score	Team 2
Benkovski Vidin	1–2	Sportist Sofia
Angel Kanchev-Levski Ruse	1–2	Spartak Varna
Stamo Kostov Popovo	1–2	TV 45 Varna
ZhSK-Botev Pleven	1–4	Lokomotiv Sofia
Orlovets Gabrovo	2–0	Vihar Dobrich
Nikolay Laskov Yambol	0–3	Botev Plovdiv
Borislav Borisovgrad	1–3	SP 45 Plovdiv
Botev Gorna Dzhumaya	1–2	Levski Sofia

== Quarter-finals ==
Team 1	Score	Team 2
Botev Plovdiv	0–2	Lokomotiv Sofia
Spartak Varna	3–0	Orlovets Gabrovo
SP 45 Plovdiv	2–2 (a.e.t.)	TV 45 Varna
Sportist Sofia	2–1	Levski Sofia
Replay
SP 45 Plovdiv	4–1	TV 45 Varna

== Semi-finals ==
Team 1	Score	Team 2
Sportist Sofia	3–2	Spartak Varna
SP 45 Plovdiv	0–1 (a.e.t.)	Lokomotiv Sofia

== Final ==
=== First game ===
30 September 1945

Lokomotiv Sofia	3–1	Sportist Sofia
Yordanov; G. Vasilev; Milev		Bozhkov

Sofia

=== Second game ===
7 October 1945

Sportist Sofia	1–1	Lokomotiv Sofia
Bozhkov		Yordanov

Sofia

Lokomotiv Sofia won 4–2 on aggregate.
