= Mohamed Medfai =

French footballer (born 2000)

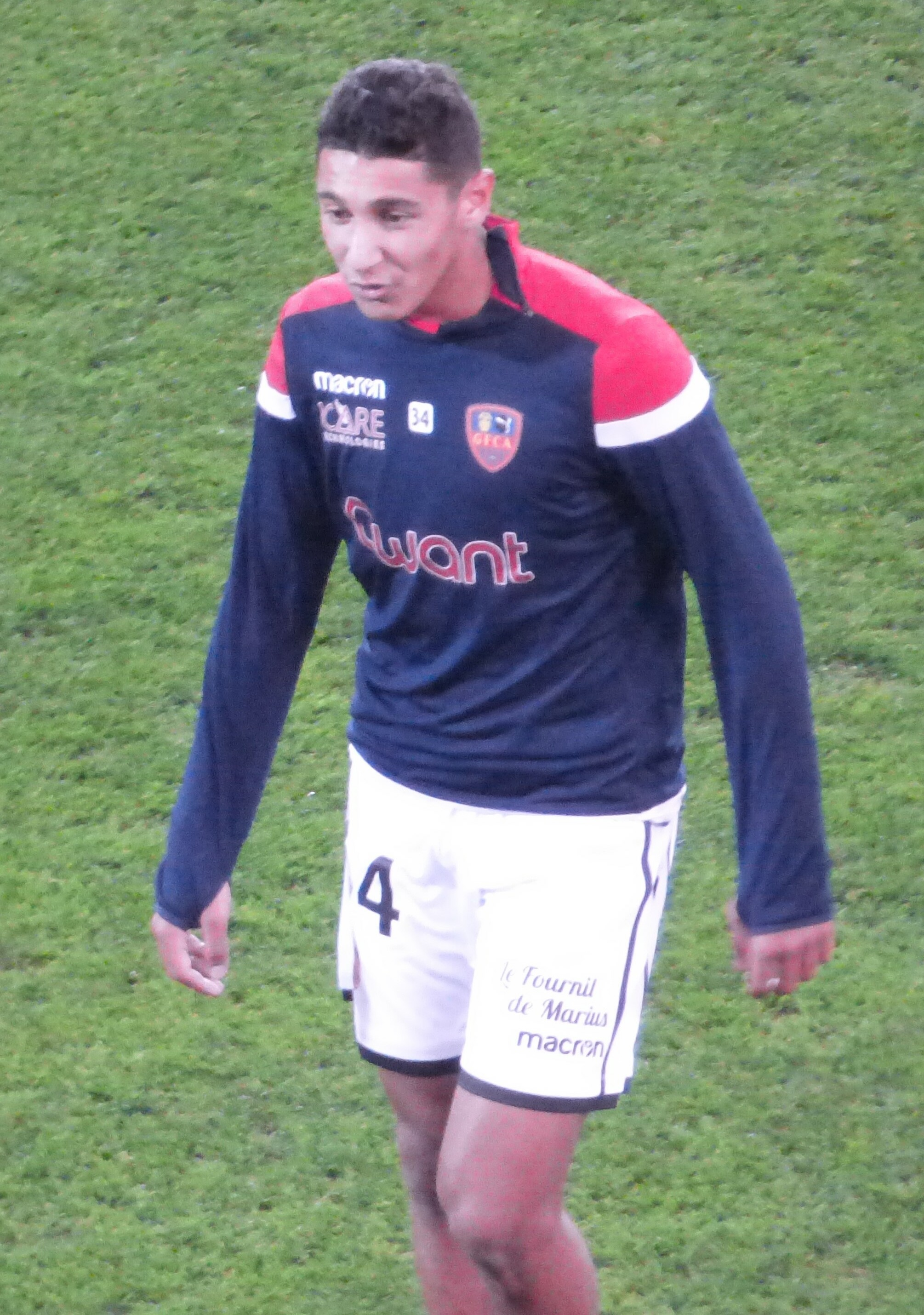
- Medfai in 2018.

Personal information
- Full name: Mohamed Medfai
- Date of birth: 8 August 2000 (age 26)
- Place of birth: Marseille, France
- Height: 1.83 m (6 ft 0 in)
- Position: Midfielder

Team information
- Current team: Lokomotiv Sofia
- Number: 16

Youth career
- Gazélec Ajaccio

Senior career*
Years	Team	Apps	(Gls)
2018–2019	Gazélec Ajaccio	0	(0)
2019–2020	Olimpia Grudziądz	18	(0)
2020–2023	Marítimo U23	18	(4)
2023	US Monastir	3	(0)
2023–2026	Olympic Charleroi	84	(14)
2026–	Lokomotiv Sofia	0	(0)
- * Club domestic league appearances and goals as of 20 April 2026

Mohamed Medfai (born 8 August 2000) is a French professional footballer who plays as a midfielder for Bulgarian First League club Lokomotiv Sofia.

== Career ==
=== Gazélec Ajaccio ===
Medfai made his professional debut with Gazélec Ajaccio in a 3–1 Coupe de la Ligue loss to AJ Auxerre on 14 August 2018.

=== Olimpia Grudziądz ===
On 5 September 2019, Medfai joined Polish club Olimpia Grudziądz.

=== Marítimo ===
On 6 October 2020, he joined Portuguese club Marítimo. He was assigned to the reserve team Marítimo Sub-23.

== Personal life ==
Born in France, Medfai is of Tunisian descent.
