= Anton Velkov =

Bulgarian footballer and manager

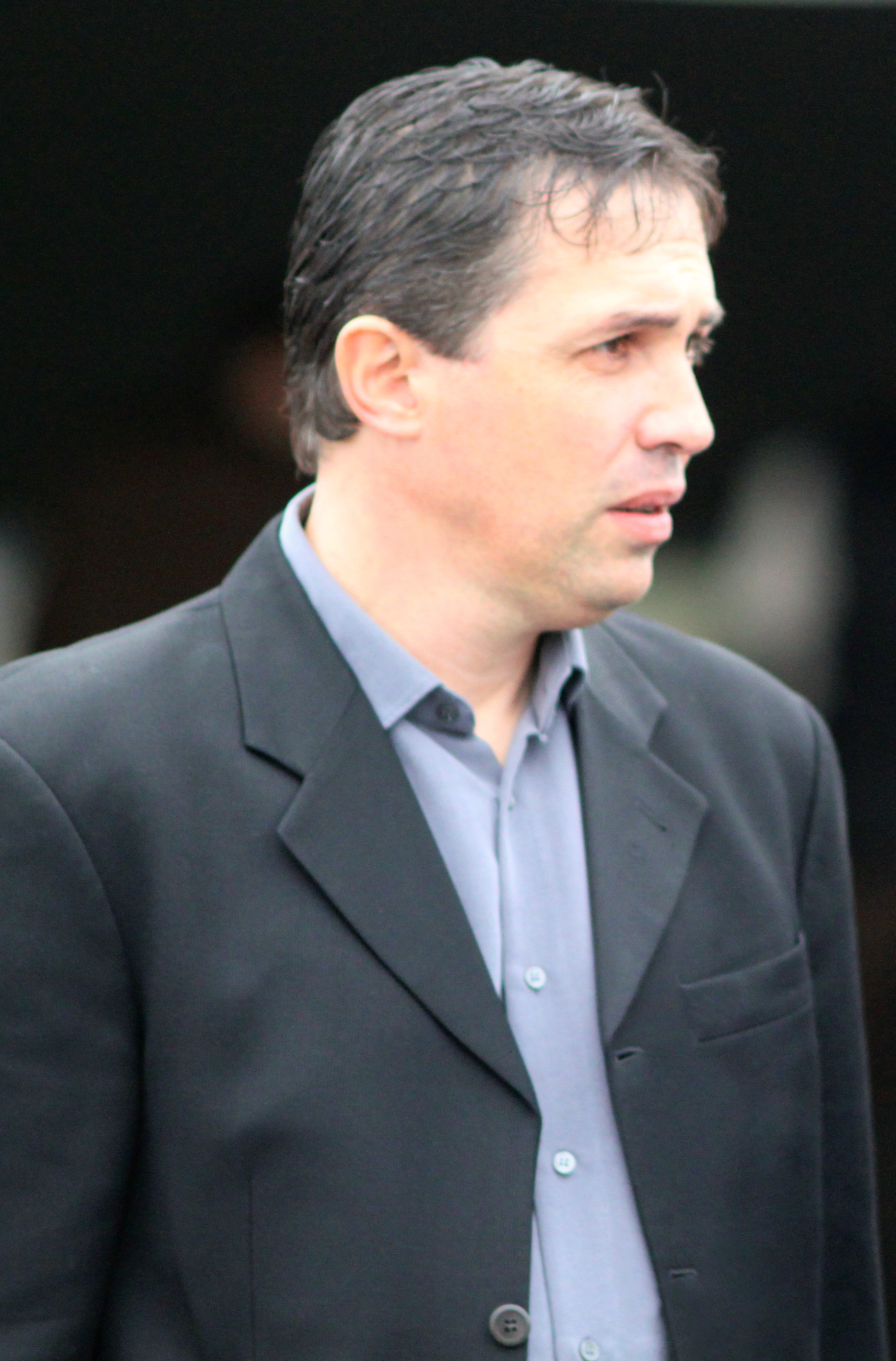

Personal information
- Full name: Anton Kostadinov Velkov
- Date of birth: 15 July 1968 (age 58)
- Place of birth: Sofia, Bulgaria
- Position: Defender

Youth career
- Lokomotiv Sofia

Senior career*
Years	Team	Apps	(Gls)
1985–1996	Lokomotiv Sofia	184	(8)
1996	Hampton Roads Mariners	?	(?)
1996–1997	Lokomotiv Sofia	21	(0)
1997–2000	SC Paderborn	71	(3)
2000–2002	Lokomotiv Sofia	19	(0)

International career
1987	Bulgaria U21	4	(0)

Managerial career
- 2007–2008: Lokomotiv Sofia (assistant)
- 2008–2009: Minyor Pernik (assistant)
- 2009–2010: Minyor Pernik
- 2010–2011: Chernomorets Burgas
- 2011–2012: Lokomotiv Sofia
- 2013–2014: Vidima-Rakovski
- 2014–2015: Marek Dupnitsa
- 2015–2016: Lokomotiv Sofia
- 2019: Bulgaria (assistant)
- 2024–2025: Lokomotiv Sofia
- * Club domestic league appearances and goals

Anton Kostadinov Velkov (born 15 July 1968) is a Bulgarian football manager and former player.

== Career ==
Born in Sofia, Velkov played in his career for Lokomotiv Sofia, USA football club Virginia Beach Mariners and German SC Paderborn.

Velkov started his coaching career in 2007 as assistant manager to Stefan Grozdanov in Lokomotiv Sofia, later serving as the club's head coach from 2015 to 2016.
