= Ryan Bidounga =

Congolese footballer (born 1997)

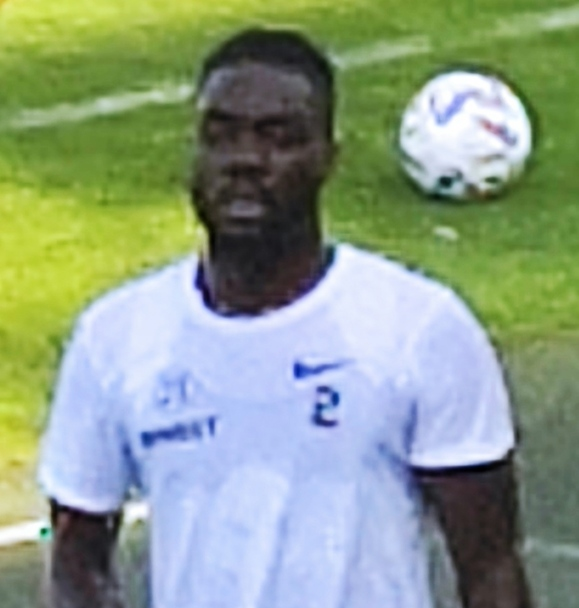

Personal information
- Date of birth: 29 April 1997 (age 29)
- Place of birth: Rambouillet, France
- Height: 1.86 m (6 ft 1 in)
- Position: Defender

Team information
- Current team: Lokomotiv Sofia
- Number: 91

Youth career
- 2003–2004: Vigneux
- 2004–2008: Montgeron
- 2008–2009: Vigneux
- 2010–2012: Brétigny
- 2012–2015: Nancy

Senior career*
Years	Team	Apps	(Gls)
2015–2019	Nancy II	52	(4)
2018–2019	→ Le Mans II (loan)	10	(2)
2018–2019	→ Le Mans (loan)	4	(1)
2019–2020	Nancy	3	(0)
2022–2023	Lokomotiv Plovdiv	24	(1)
2023–2025	CSKA 1948	18	(0)
2023–2025	CSKA 1948 II	6	(0)
2025–	Lokomotiv Sofia	42	(5)

International career^{‡}
2013	France U16	4	(0)
2013–2014	France U17	4	(0)
2022–	Congo	10	(0)
- * Club domestic league appearances and goals as of 11 June 2026 ‡ National team caps and goals as of 5 May 2025

Ryan Bidounga (born 29 April 1997) is a professional footballer who plays as a defender for Bulgarian First League club Lokomotiv Sofia. Born in France, he represents Congo at international level.

== Club career ==
Bidounga made his professional debut with Nancy in a 1–0 Coupe de la Ligue win over Caen on 13 August 2019.

On 17 February 2022, Bidounga signed with Bulgarian First League club Lokomotiv Plovdiv.

== International career ==
Born in France, Bidounga is of Congolese descent. He is a former youth international for France. He was called up to represent the Congo, the home country of his parents, for a set of friendlies in March 2022. He debuted with the Congo in a friendly 3–1 loss to Zambia on 25 March 2022.
