= 1981–82 Bulgarian Cup =

Tournament details
- Country: Bulgaria

Final positions
- Champions: Lokomotiv Sofia (3rd cup)
- Runners-up: Lokomotiv Plovdiv

Tournament statistics
- Top goal scorer(s): Stoycho Mladenov (CSKA) (8 goals)

The 1981–82 Bulgarian Cup was the 42nd season of the Bulgarian Cup (in this period the tournament was named Cup of the Soviet Army). Lokomotiv Sofia won the competition, beating Lokomotiv Plovdiv 2–1 after extra time in the final at the Slavi Aleksiev Stadium in Pleven.

== First round ==
Team 1	Score	Team 2
2 December 1981
Trakia Kolarovo	0–2	Lokomotiv Sofia
Lokomotiv Kaspichan	1–2	Slavia Sofia
Rodopi Momchilgrad	2–1 (a.e.t.)	Hebar Pazardzhik
Chernolomets Popovo	2–1	Dunav Ruse
Lokomotiv Levski	1–2 (a.e.t.)	Beroe Stara Zagora
Lokomotiv Mezdra	1–0	Vihren Sandanski
Tryavna	2–1	Rilski Sportist
Dimitrovgrad	1–3	Akademik Sofia
Tundzha Yambol	2–4 (a.e.t.)	Etar Veliko Tarnovo
Belasitsa Petrich	1–2	Metalurg Pernik
Cherno More Varna	1–0	Dorostol Silistra
Nesebar	0–2	Spartak Varna
Kaliakra Kavarna	1–0	Neftochimic Burgas
Lokomotiv Plovdiv	1–0	Chernomorets Burgas
Minyor Pernik	4–2	Sliven
Slivnishki Geroy	2–1	Litex Lovech
Chumerna Elena	2–7	Haskovo
Yantra Gabrovo	1–0	Shumen
Bdin Vidin	1–2 (a.e.t.)	Botev Vratsa
Lokomotiv GO	3–0	Asenovets Asenovgrad
Rozova Dolina	3–0	Beloslav
Svetkavitsa	3–2	Montana
Spartak Pleven	0–1	Dobrudzha Dobrich
Levski Sofia	6–0	Botev Ihtiman
Minyor Buhovo	0–1	Pirin Blagoevgrad
Marek Dupnitsa	1–0	Akademik Svishtov
Chirpan	3–1	Chavdar Troyan
Pavlikeni	5–2	Benkovski Isperih
Maritsa Plovdiv	2–0	Rodopa Smolyan
Ludogorets Razgrad	7–1	Levski Karlovo
CSKA Sofia	9–1	Chepinets Velingrad
Botev Plovdiv	8–0	Arda Kardzhali

== Second round ==
Team 1	Score	Team 2
8 December 1981
Levski Sofia	3–0	Slivnishki Geroy
CSKA Sofia	4–2	Kaliakra Kavarna
Svetkavitsa	2–0	Maritsa Plovdiv
Pavlikeni	3–1	Minyor Pernik
Ludogorets Razgrad	0–2	Lokomotiv Plovdiv
Slavia Sofia	4–0	Chirpan
Etar Veliko Tarnovo	4–1	Yantra Gabrovo
Beroe Stara Zagora	4–1	Rodopi Momchilgrad
Pirin Blagoevgrad	2–0	Marek Dupnitsa
Haskovo	3–1	Tryavna
Lokomotiv Sofia	3–0	Lokomotiv Mezdra
Dobrudzha Dobrich	2–0	Cherno More Varna
Metalurg Pernik	3–1	Chernolomets Popovo
Spartak Varna	0–1	Rozova Dolina
Botev Vratsa	3–0 (a.e.t.)	Botev Plovdiv
Akademik Sofia	1–0	Lokomotiv GO

== Third round ==
Team 1	Score	Team 2
3 March 1982
Rozova Dolina	2–2 (a.e.t.) (7–8 p)	Slavia Sofia
Lokomotiv Plovdiv	5–2	Dobrudzha Dobrich
Metalurg Pernik	3–1	Svetkavitsa
Pirin Blagoevgrad	1–0	Akademik Sofia
Beroe Stara Zagora	1–0	Levski Sofia
Pavlikeni	0–2	Lokomotiv Sofia
Etar Veliko Tarnovo	1–0	Haskovo
CSKA Sofia	4–0	Botev Vratsa

== Quarter-finals ==
Team 1	Score	Team 2
31 March 1982
Beroe Stara Zagora	1–2	CSKA Sofia
Metalurg Pernik	0–4	Lokomotiv Sofia
Lokomotiv Plovdiv	4–1	Slavia Sofia
Pirin Blagoevgrad	2–0	Etar Veliko Tarnovo

== Semi-finals ==
Team 1	Score	Team 2
2 June 1982
Lokomotiv Sofia	3–2	CSKA Sofia
Pirin Blagoevgrad	0–1	Lokomotiv Plovdiv

== Final ==
=== Details ===
12 June 1982

Lokomotiv Sofia	2−1 (a.e.t.)	Lokomotiv Plovdiv
Velichkov 28'; Stoev 109'		Sotirov 57'

Slavi Aleksiev Stadium, Pleven
Attendance: 8,000
Referee: Ivan Yosifov (Sofia)

Lokomotiv Sofia	Lokomotiv Plovdiv
