= Angel Kolev =

Bulgarian footballer and manager

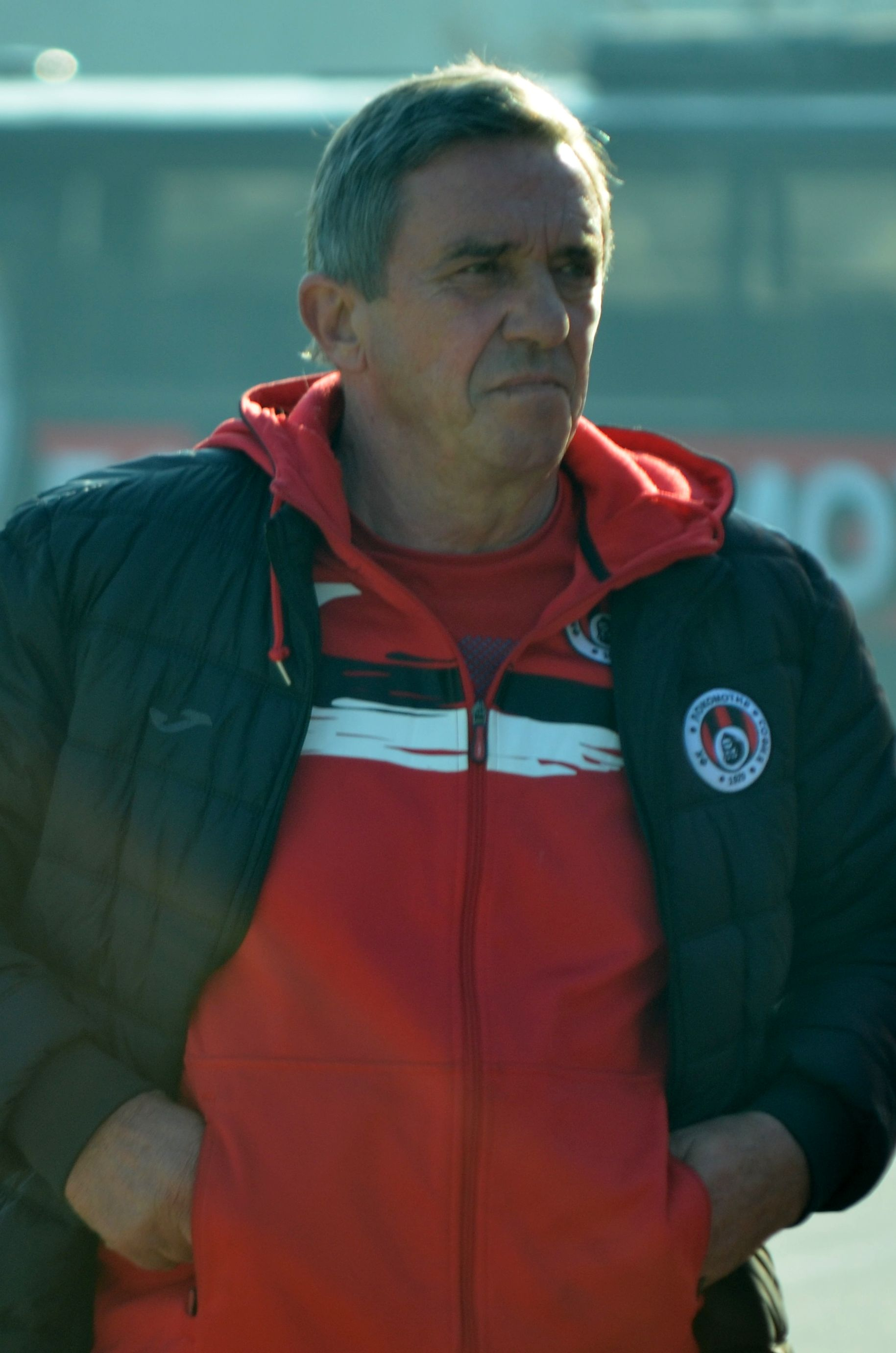

Personal information
- Date of birth: 22 August 1953 (age 73)
- Place of birth: Sofia, Bulgaria
- Height: 1.79 m (5 ft 10 1/2 in)
- Position: Winger

Senior career*
Years	Team	Apps	(Gls)
1972–1982	Lokomotiv Sofia	252	(33)
1982–1984	AEK Athens	8	(0)
1984	Shumen		

International career
1976–1979	Bulgaria	8	(0)

Managerial career
- 1985–1988: Lokomotiv Sofia (assistant)
- 1990–1991: Akademik Svishtov
- 1991–1994: Lokomotiv Sofia
- 1995–1996: Alki Larnaca
- 1996–1997: AC Omonia
- 1998–1999: Enosis Neon Paralimni
- 2001: Lokomotiv Sofia
- 2002–2003: Ermis Aradippou
- 2016: Lokomotiv Sofia
- 2018: Lokomotiv Sofia
- * Club domestic league appearances and goals

Angel Kolev (Bulgarian: Ангел Колев; born 22 August 1953) is a Bulgarian football manager and former footballer. He is currently Lokomotiv 1929 Sofia's director of football.

== Club career ==
Kolev started his football career at Lokomotiv Sofia, where he was established and played 10 years, becoming their captain winning a league in 1978 and a Bulgarian Cup in 1982.

On 21 July 1982, the release of his compatriot Hristo Bonev from AEK Athens brought his transfer to the Greek club for a fee of 3.5 million drachmas. Kolev had a good recommendation by Bonev and the reputation of him being a complete midfielder raised the club's expectation that would help them to escape from their competitive decline. Kolev did not live up to expectations, making a total of 12 appearances with AEK in which only one was as a starter. He did not actively participate in the conquest of the Greek Cup in 1983. As if that wasn't enough, the following season he "sat" on his contract, occupying a foreigner's position in the roster. On 17 November 1984 he was released from AEK.

He continued his career at Shumen, that was also disappointing. The inaction at AEK and the will of the footballer himself, led him to the decision to retire as a footballer in 1985, at the age of 33.

== International career ==
Kolev played with Bulgaria making 8 appearances.

== Managerial career ==
Kolev got involved in coaching, with Lokomotiv, Akademik Svishtov, AC Omonia and Enosis Neon Paralimni being the main stations of his career.

== Honours ==
=== As a layer ===
Lokomotiv Sofia

- Bulgarian A Group: 1977–78
- Bulgarian Cup: 1981–82

AEK Athens

- Greek Cup: 1982–83
