= Rumyancho Goranov =

Bulgarian footballer

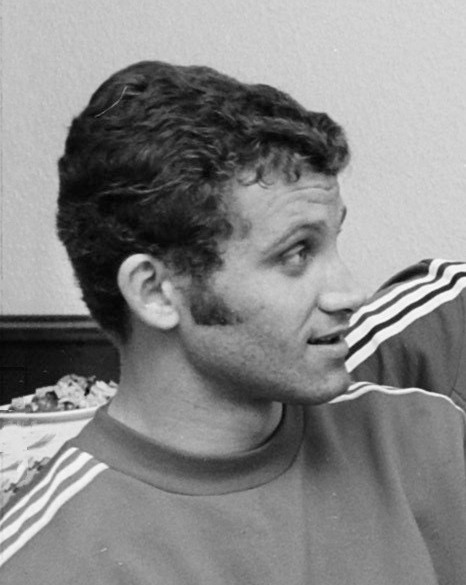
- Rumyancho Goranov in 1974

Personal information
- Full name: Rumyancho Goranov Radev
- Date of birth: 17 March 1950 (age 76)
- Place of birth: Pleven, Bulgaria
- Position: Goalkeeper

Senior career*
Years	Team	Apps	(Gls)
1967–1970	Spartak Pleven	14	(0)
1970–1971	Levski Sofia	2	(0)
1971–1982	Lokomotiv Sofia	245	(0)
1982–1984	APOEL		
1984–1986	Aris Limassol		
1986–1988	Olympiakos Nicosia		
1988–1989	Mosta FC	14	(1)

International career
1971–1979	Bulgaria	34	(0)
- * Club domestic league appearances and goals

Rumyancho Goranov Radev (Bulgarian: Румянчо Горанов Радев; 17 March 1950) is a former Bulgarian football goalkeeper.

He played mostly for Lokomotiv Sofia. With Bulgaria national team he participated at 1974 FIFA World Cup. He gained 34 caps for Bulgaria.

== Honours ==
=== Club ===
- Lokomotiv Sofia
  - A PFG:
    - Winner: 1977–78
  - Bulgarian Cup:
    - Winner: 1981–82
- Levski Sofia
  - Bulgarian Cup:
    - Winner: 1970–71
