= Boycho Velichkov =

Bulgarian footballer

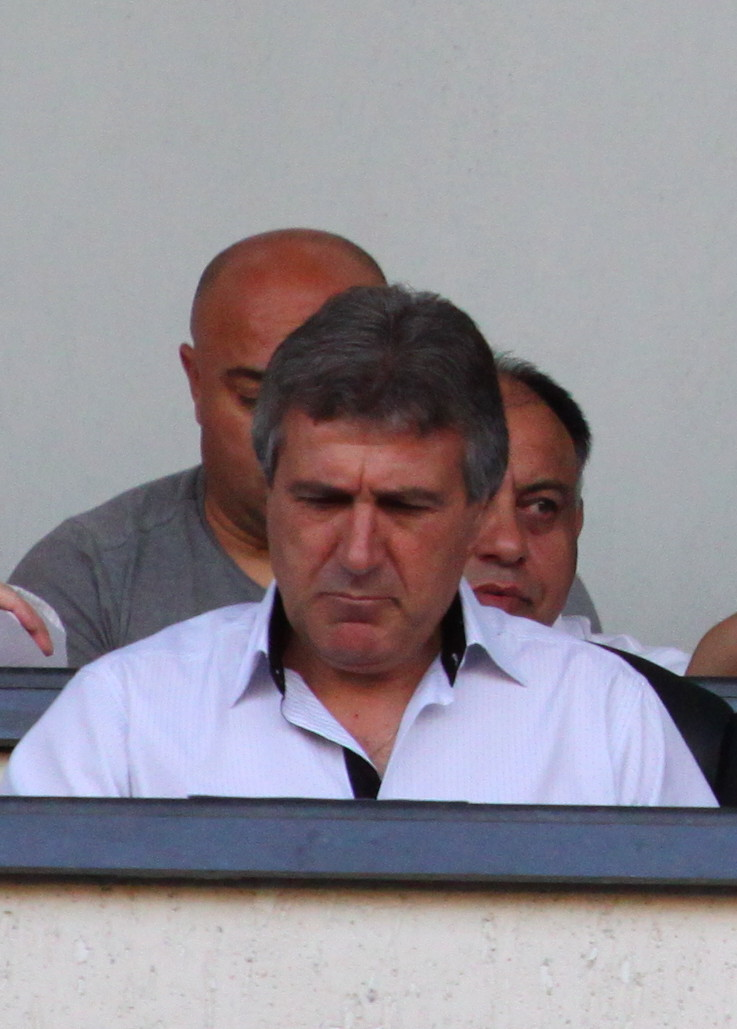

Personal information
- Full name: Boycho Petrov Velichkov
- Date of birth: 13 August 1958 (age 68)
- Place of birth: Sofia, Bulgaria
- Height: 1.81 m (5 ft 11 in)
- Position: Forward

Senior career*
Years	Team	Apps	(Gls)
1975–1986	Lokomotiv Sofia	271	(90)
1986–1987	Le Havre	22	(1)
1987–1990	Panserraikos	67	(24)
Total		360	(115)

International career
1978–1980	Bulgaria U21	8	(2)
1979–1986	Bulgaria	27	(4)

Managerial career
- Lokomotiv Sofia
- * Club domestic league appearances and goals

Boycho Petrov Velichkov (Bulgarian: Бойчо Пeтpoв Величков, born 13 August 1958) is a former Bulgarian football forward.

== Career ==
For the Bulgaria national team Velichkov featured in 45 games and scored 23 goals, also appearing at the 1986 World Cup.

Most of Velichkov's club career was spent with Lokomotiv Sofia, winning the top Bulgarian league, once—in 1978. He also played for one year in French Le Havre AC and two seasons in Greek Panserraikos, scoring scored 39 goals. In October 2007 the Greek club declared Velichkov the "best foreign player in the club of all times".

== Honours ==
Lokomotiv Sofia

- Bulgarian League: 1977–78
- Bulgarian Cup: 1981–82
