= Stoycho Stoev =

Bulgarian footballer and manager

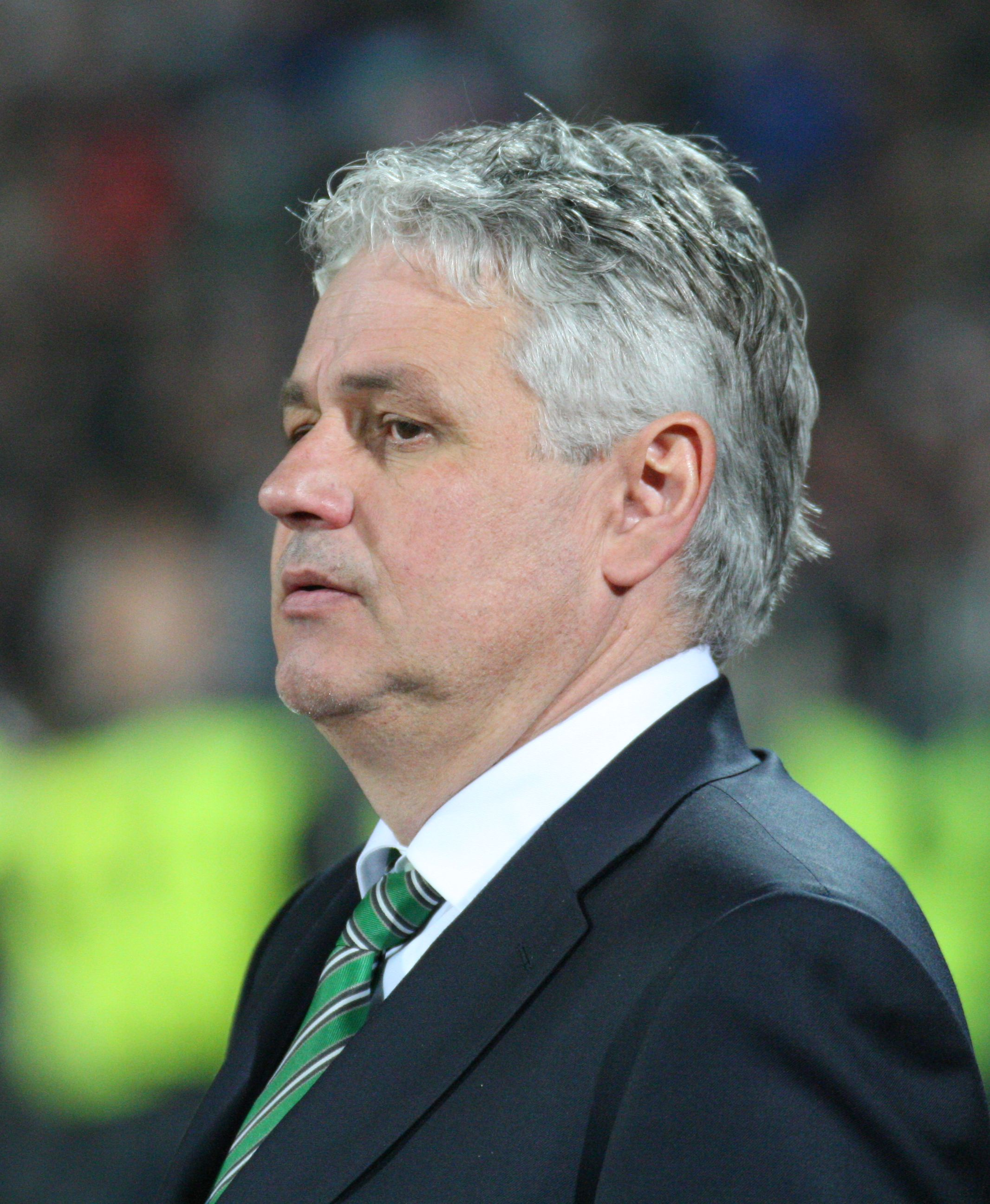

Personal information
- Full name: Stoycho Zahariev Stoev
- Date of birth: 15 July 1962 (age 64)
- Place of birth: Razgrad, Bulgaria
- Height: 1.79 m (5 ft 10 1/2 in)
- Position: Forward

Team information
- Current team: Lokomotiv Sofia (manager)

Senior career*
| Years | Team | Apps | (Gls) |
| 1980–1989 | Lokomotiv Sofia | 196 | (59) |
| 1989–1992 | Panserraikos | 44 | (5) |
| Total | | 240 | (64) |

International career
| 1987–1988 | Bulgaria | 2 | (0) |

Managerial career
- 1998: Lokomotiv Sofia (assistant)
- 2000: Bulgaria U17
- 2001–2003: Akademik Svishtov
- 2007–2009: Chavdar Etropole
- 2009–2010: Sportist Svoge
- 2010–2012: Minyor Pernik
- 2013: Montana
- 2013–2014: Ludogorets Razgrad
- 2014–2016: Levski Sofia
- 2018–2019: Arda Kardzhali
- 2019: Ludogorets Razgrad
- 2026-: FC Yambol
- * Club domestic league appearances and goals

Stoycho Zahariev Stoev (Bulgarian: Стойчо Захариев Стоев; born 15 July 1962) is a Bulgarian former footballer and manager.

== Managerial career ==
On 23 July 2013, Bulgaria champions Ludogorets Razgrad replaced coach Ivaylo Petev with Stoycho Stoev, following a 1–0 defeat by Lyubimets on the opening day of the new season.

In the 2013–14 UEFA Europa League he managed Ludogorets to win their group and proceed to the round of 32. After a surprising 1-0 loss against Haskovo, Stoev was released by the club. On 22 December 2014 Stoycho Stoev took charge of Levski Sofia. On 13 May 2016, after a meeting with the board of directors, it was announced that Stoev had been released by the club.

On 26 August 2018 he was appointed as manager of Arda Kardzhali. In early March 2019, Stoev once again became head coach of Ludogorets Razgrad, taking over from Antoni Zdravkov. On 25 August 2019, Stoev was fired once again from the club following a 0:0 home draw with Slavia Sofia. In June 2023, he was appointed as manager of Lokomotiv Sofia.

== Manager ==
=== Statistics ===
As of 22 August 2019

| Team | From | To | Record | | | | |
| Team | From | To | G | W | D | L | Win % |
|---|---|---|---|---|---|---|---|
| Minyor Pernik | 2010 | 2013 | 61 | 18 | 20 | 23 | 29.51 |
| Montana | 2013 | - | 6 | 0 | 1 | 5 | 0.00 |
| Ludogorets Razgrad | 2013 | 2014 | 62 | 42 | 12 | 8 | 67.74 |
| Levski Sofia | 2014 | 2016 | 48 | 26 | 11 | 11 | 54.17 |
| Arda Kardzhali | 2018 | 2019 | 15 | 8 | 4 | 3 | 53.33 |
| Ludogorets Razgrad | March 2019 | August 2019 | 27 | 14 | 9 | 4 | 51.85 |
| Total | | | 219 | 108 | 57 | 54 | 49.32 |

== Honours ==
=== Player honours ===
Lokomotiv Sofia

- Bulgarian Cup (1): 1982

=== Managerial honours ===
Ludogorets Razgrad

- Bulgarian A Group (2): 2013–14, 2018–19
- Bulgarian Cup (1): 2013–14
- Bulgarian Supercup (1): 2019
- Manager of the year in the A PFG - 2013
- 3rd place in the coach (for all sports) in Bulgaria rankings - 2013
