= Atanas Mihaylov =

Bulgarian footballer (1949–2006)

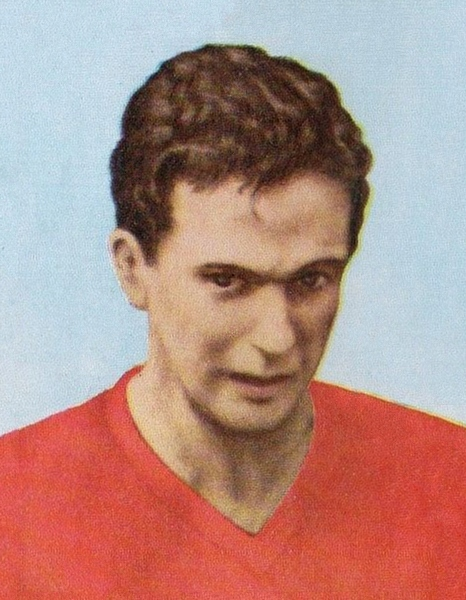

Personal information
- Full name: Atanas Hristov Mihaylov
- Date of birth: 5 July 1949
- Place of birth: Sofia, Bulgaria
- Date of death: 1 October 2006 (aged 57)
- Height: 1.85 m (6 ft 1 in)
- Position: Forward

Senior career*
Years	Team	Apps	(Gls)
1964–1968	Lokomotiv Sofia	77	(26)
1969–1971	ZHSK Slavia	43	(14)
1971–1981	Lokomotiv Sofia	229	(105)
1981–1983	Nea Salamina	44	(14)
Total		393	(159)

International career
	Bulgaria U21	46	(31)
1970–1981	Bulgaria	45	(23)

Managerial career
- Lokomotiv Sofia
Medal record
Olympic Games
Silver medal – second place	1968 Mexico City	Team competition
- * Club domestic league appearances and goals

Atanas Hristov Mihaylov (Bulgarian: Атанас Xpиcтов Михайлов, 5 July 1949 – 1 October 2006) was an association football former forward and manager. Mihаylov is the top scorer in the history of the Bulgaria U21 team, managing 31 goals in 46 appearances. He played 45 games for the Bulgaria national football team, scored 23 goals, and won a silver medal at the 1968 Summer Olympics; he also played at the 1974 World Cup. Most of Mihaylov's club career was spent with Lokomotiv Sofia, but he also played for two years in Cyprus for Nea Salamina. He won the top Bulgarian league on two occasions. Mihaylov was known for his skills from set pieces, including scoring from corners.

== Honours ==
=== Player ===
- Lokomotiv Sofia
  - Bulgarian League: 1977–78

== Vivliography ==
- Stilianou, Pampos (1998). 50 χρόνια Νέα Σαλαμίνα 1948–1998 [50 years Nea Salamina 1948–1998] (in Greek). Cyprus: Nea Salamina Famagusta. ISBN 9963-8370-0-X.

Awards and achievements
Preceded by Rumen Goranov	Bulgarian Footballer of the Year; 1979	Succeeded by Andrey Zhelyazkov
