= Sedat Özden =

Turkish footballer

Personal information
- Full name: Ali Sedat Özden
- Date of birth: 30 August 1953 (age 73)
- Place of birth: Bursa, Turkey
- Position: Midfielder

Senior career*
Years	Team	Apps	(Gls)
1973–1986	Bursaspor	335	(53)

International career^{‡}
1977	Turkey U21	1	(1)
1977–1985	Turkey	34	(7)

Managerial career
- 1986: Bursaspor
- * Club domestic league appearances and goals as of 2 July 2017 ‡ National team caps and goals as of 2 July 2017

Ali Sedat Özden (born 30 August 1953), better known as Sedat 3, is a Turkish retired professional football player who played as a midfielder. A one club man for Bursaspor, Sedat is considered a legend of the club for his loyalty and consistent performances over his 13 years with the club.

== International career ==
Sedat made his first appearance with the Turkey national football team in a Balkans Cup 4-0 loss to Romania on 23 March 1977. He ended up making 34 total appearances for Turkey, the last in 1985.

== Managerial career ==
Shortly after his retirement, Sedat briefly managed Buraspor in 1986.
