= Stadion Pleven =

Stadium in Pleven, Bulgaria

- Interactive map of Stadion Pleven
- Former names: Stadion Slavi Aleksiev
- Coordinates: 43.4125°N 24.6086°E
- Capacity: 3,000

Construction
- Opened: 1952
- Renovated: 2012

Stadion Pleven (Bulgarian: Стадион „Плевен“, English: 'Pleven Stadium') is a multi-purpose stadium in Pleven, Bulgaria. It is currently used mostly for football matches as the home venue of the Spartak Pleven. The stadium was built in 1952 and seats 3,000 people.

== History ==
The stadium used to have a capacity for 25,000 people. In 2012, the first 3,000 individual seats were installed in the western sectors to satisfy the licensing criteria of the Bulgarian "B" group. As of 2023, the rest of the stands are "in ruin". Further improvements had been conditioned on the club getting promoted to the top flight.

Several reconstruction projects for the venue were proposed between 2015 and present.

== See also ==
- Belite Orli Stadium
