= Nasko Zhelev =

Bulgarian footballer

Nasko Jelev
Personal information
- Date of birth: 9 January 1960 (age 66)
- Position: Defender

Senior career*
Years	Team	Apps	(Gls)
1979–1987	PFC Lokomotiv Sofia		
1988–1992	1. FC Saarbrücken		
1992–1993	FC 08 Homburg		

International career
- Bulgaria u-21
1990	Bulgaria	2	(0)

Managerial career
- 2003–2004: 1. FC Saarbrücken (assistant)
- * Club domestic league appearances and goals

Nasko Jelev (Bulgarian: Наско Желев, born 9 January 1960) is a retired Bulgarian football defender.
