= Yordan Stoykov =

Bulgarian football player and manager

Personal information
- Full name: Yordan Ivanov Stoykov
- Date of birth: 6 November 1951 (age 74)
- Place of birth: Bulgaria
- Position: Defender

Team information
- Current team: Lyulin Sofia

Senior career*
Years	Team	Apps	(Gls)
1970–1971	ZHSK Slavia	9	(0)
1971–1983	Lokomotiv Sofia	326	(13)

International career
19??–1973	Bulgaria U23	27	(?)
1973–1979	Bulgaria	9	(?)

Managerial career
- 1983–1985: Lokomotiv Sofia (assistant)
- 1985–1986: Balkan Botevgrad
- 1986–1989: Bulgaria U18
- 1991–1992: Al-Ittihad Tripoli
- 1992–1993: Pirin Gotse Delchev
- 1993–1995: Malindi
- 1995–1996: Shumen
- 1996–1997: Shanghai Shenhua
- 1997–1998: Kremikovtsi Sofia
- 1998: Hebar Pazardzhik
- 1999–2000: Maldives
- 2002: DPMM FC
- 2004–2005: New Radiant
- 2005–2007: Maldives
- 2007–2008: DPMM FC
- 2010: Chavdar Byala Slatina
- 2010–2014: EEPCO
- 2015: Mahibadhoo
- 2016: New Radiant
- 2022: Tsarsko Selo (assistant)
- 2026–: Lyulin Sofia
- * Club domestic league appearances and goals

Yordan Ivanov Stoykov (Bulgarian: Йордан Иванов Стойков; born 6 November 1951) is a Bulgarian professional football player and manager, who is currently head manager of Lyulin Sofia.

== Career ==
Yordan Stoykov played as a defender in Lokomotiv Sofia from 1970 to 1983, as record 336 appearances for his home club. With it he became champion in 1978 and has won the Bulgarian Cup in 1982. He played in UEFA tournaments. For the youth national team has 27 games and for the Bulgaria national football team - 9 matches.

In 1979, he graduated the National Sports Academy "Vassil Levski" and began his coaching career as an assistant coach in PFC Lokomotiv Sofia from 1983 to 1985. In season 1985/1986 he was a senior coach of the PFC Balkan Botevgrad. From 1986 to 1991 he was scary coach of the youth national team. Lead the team of Al-Ittihad Club (Tripoli) in 1991/1992 and he was a senior coach of the PFC Pirin Gotse Delchev in 1992/1993, and then for two years in Tanzania (1993–1995), where local Malindi F.C. won the Tanzanian Cup and Super Cup and led the team at the seventh place at the African Club Tournaments. He was head coach of the PFC Shumen 2010 (1995/1996) and of the Shanghai Greenland Shenhua F.C. (China) in 1996-1997 and Kremikovtsi Sofia in 1997–1998.

In 1999, he became of the head coach of the Maldives national football team. In 2004, he worked at the New Radiant SC Since January 2005 until October 2007 he again coached the Maldives national team. Since July until September 2010 he trained PFC Chavdar Byala Slatina. On September 15, 2010, he named of the EEPCO F.C. head coach.

== Honours ==
- Bulgarian A Football Group:

1978

- Bulgarian Cup:

1982
