= FC Lokomotiv Sofia =

Bulgarian football club

Lokomotiv Sofia
- Full name: Football Club Lokomotiv Sofia
- Nickname: Железничарите (The Railwaymen)
- Founded: 2 September 1929; 97 years ago (as Railway Sports Club)
- Ground: Stadion Lokomotiv, Sofia
- Capacity: 22,000
- Owner: Veselin Stoyanov
- Manager: Vacant
- League: First League
- 2025–26: First League, 10th of 16
- Website: fclokomotivsofia.bg
Home colours	Away colours	Third colours

FC Lokomotiv Sofia (Bulgarian: ФК Локомотив София) is a Bulgarian professional association football club based in Sofia, which currently plays in the First League, the top tier of Bulgarian football.

Founded as Railway Sports Club in 1929, and refounded in 2015, following bankruptcy, the club has played at Stadion Lokomotiv since 1985.

The original Lokomotiv has won four League titles and four Bulgarian Cups. Lokomotiv established itself as one of Bulgaria's top clubs throughout history, performing strongly both domestically and internationally. The club has spent the majority of its history in the top tier First League (previously A Group), with brief interruptions including a short-lived merging with Slavia Sofia in 1969, as well as an administrative relegation in 2015, due to financial problems. After the financial turbulences in 2015, the original club was declared bankrupt and has since become inactive. The newly established FC Lokomotiv 1929 Sofia is considered an unofficial successor and is not recognized as the legitimate and rightful owner of the honors and history of the original club, as per the Bulgarian Football Union.

Lokomotiv traditionally play in red and black-striped shirts.

== History ==
=== 1929–1945: Foundation and early successes ===
Lokomotiv was founded on 2 September 1929 as Railway Sports Club (RSC) by a group of railway workers. RSC's first competitive game was a 2–1 victory against Zora Sofia on 3 October 1929. In the 1939–40 season, RSC won the Bulgarian title for first time in the team's history. The team was made by: Stoyo Nedyalkov (captain), Sl. Videnov, K. Kostov, D. Marinov, St. Angelov, As. Milushev, Krum Milev, L. Hranov. In 1945, the club had already been renamed Lokomotiv Sofia and won the title in the first post-war championship.

=== 1960–1990: Continued domestic and European success ===
During season 1963–64 after 30 games, Lokomotiv won their third title after they defeated main rivals to the title Levski Sofia and Slavia Sofia. This achievement enabled Lokomotiv to participate in the 1964–65 European Cup preliminary round for the first time ever. Lokomotiv were drawn against Swedish champions Malmö. In the first leg, played at the Vasil Levski National Stadium in Sofia, Lokomotiv trashed their rivals with a score of 8–3, with Nikola Kotkov scoring five goals in that match. The Railroaders lost the second game in Sweden by 0–2, but still progressed to the first ground on aggregate. In the first round, Lokomotiv were drawn against Hungarian champions Gyóri ETO FC. In the first leg, played in Hungary, Lokomotiv Sofia lost by 5–3. The return leg in Sofia was crucial for Loko's progression to the next round. Lokomotiv won the game 4–3, but were eliminated on aggregate 8–7 by their Hungarian rivals, thus ending Lokomotiv's first European Cup adventure.

In 1969, the club was united with Slavia Sofia for a brief period to 1971 and the unified team was associated with the Bulgarian railway workers. In 1971, the two teams were separated again. In Europe the club won the European championship of the railwaymen two times, in 1961 and 1963, and the Balkans Cup in 1973.

In 1978, Lokomotiv were crowned champions for the fourth time, finishing one point above CSKA Sofia. This team was led by club legends Atanas Mihaylov and Boycho Velichkov. This qualified the team for the European Cup for the second time in their history. In the first round, Lokomotiv faced Danish champions Odense. The first game in Denmark ended in a 2–2 tie, with Angel Kolev and Boycho Velichkov scoring important away goals. In the second game played on home soil, Lokomotiv managed to overcome a 0–1 deficit and won the game 2–1, thus progressing to the second round 4–3 on aggregate. In the second round, Lokomotiv were drawn against a much tougher opponent, in the name of 1. FC Köln from West Germany at the time. Seen as clear outsiders, Lokomotiv lost the first game in Sofia 1–0, while they were brutally beaten 4–0 in the return leg in Köln, thus being eliminated from the European Cup.

In 1980, Lokomotiv reached a quarter final in the UEFA Cup where they faced VfB Stuttgart, eliminating before that Ferencváros, AS Monaco and Dynamo Kyiv. Against Stuttgart the team lost with 0–1 in Sofia and with 1–3 in Germany.

In 1982, Lokomotiv won the Bulgarian cup for the third time in its history, qualifying for the 1982-83 European Cup Winners Cup. Lokomotiv faced French team PSG. The first leg in Sofia ended in a 1–0 win, however the return leg ended in a heavy 5–1 defeat, which eliminated Lokomotiv.

Lokomotiv finished the 1984–85 season in fourth place, which enabled another UEFA Cup qualification, for season 1985–86. Lokomotiv's first opponent was Cypriot side APOEL. After some drama in both legs, the Railroaders advanced to the second round with an aggregate score of 6–4. There, Lokomotiv faced Neuchâtel Xamax from Switzerland. Lokomotiv drew 1–1 at home, but failed to find the net in the return leg, which ended in a 0–0 draw. This score was unfavorable for Lokomotiv, since the away goals rule favored their Swiss opponents in this case, and Lokomotiv was eliminated.

=== 1994–2015, Nikolay Gigov era; From Top Tier to Third League ===
The new era for Lokomotiv Sofia came in 1994 with the new president Nikolay Gigov. The football club's status was turned professional. For merely one year (1994–95), from a team struggling not to lose its place in the professional league, Lokomotiv won the silver medals in the Championship and the State Cup. The club's home ground is Lokomotiv Stadium with 25,000 places, included a junior training centre: Lokomotiv has an enthusiastic and well-organized fan-club. The team came fourth in the 2005–06 season in A PFG and qualified for the 2006–07 UEFA Cup first qualifying round, where they faced FK Makedonija Gjorče Petrov from the Republic of Macedonia. Lokomotiv beat the Macedonian side 2–0 in the first match in Sofia on 13 July 2006 and finished 1–1 as a guest in Macedonia and continued to the next round of the tournament. Next, they faced the team of Bnei Yehuda Tel Aviv, which they beat twice: 2–0 on 10 August 2006 and 4–0 on 24 August 2006. Their next opponent in the first round of the tournament was the team of Feyenoord Rotterdam. The first game in Sofia ended with a 2–2 draw, after Lokomotiv went ahead 2–0 early in the first half. The second game finished 0–0 and Lokomotiv Sofia were out of the UEFA tournament.

Domestically, Lokomotiv had an amazing run of 10 consecutive wins, before being stopped by CSKA Sofia in the direct clash for the second position. Eventually, Lokomotiv finished third with equal points with second-placed CSKA Sofia.

The 2007–08 season started promisingly for the team. In the UEFA Cup second qualifying round Lokomotiv eliminated Romanian side Oţelul Galaţi after a 3–1 win at home and a scoreless away draw. This marked 8 European games without a loss, which was a new national record for longest streak without a loss achieved by a Bulgarian team in all European competitions. The previous record of 7 games was held by Levski Sofia. In the next round, Lokomotiv faced the French Rennes and the loss 1–3 in the first leg in Sofia marked an end to the team's winning streak in Europe. The Bulgarian side showed a surprising rally in the second game in France, which they won 2–1 and were only a single goal short of making it to the extra time. For a second consecutive year, Lokomotiv were stopped short of entering the group stage of the UEFA Cup, despite being the first Bulgarian club in football history to snatch a victory on French soil. The team finished third during the 2014–15 season in the A PFG, but was denied a license for the European tournaments and A Group due to unpaid debts. Lokomotiv were relegated to Bulgaria's third division, the V Group.

=== FC Lokomotiv 1929: Lower leagues and return to the elite ===
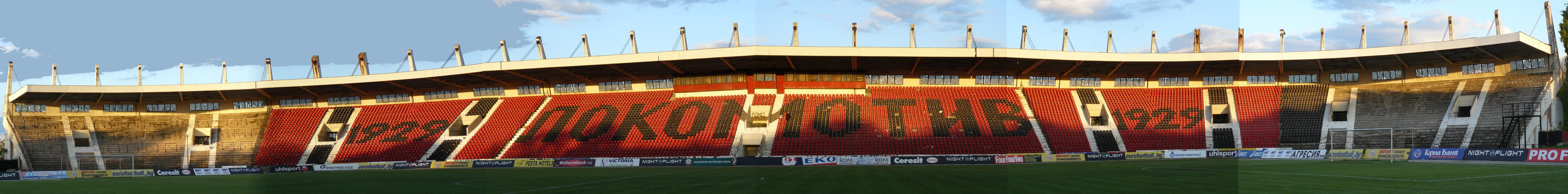
Stadion Lokomotiv

After being relegated to the third tier of Bulgarian football, Lokomotiv experienced serious financial problems and the club was disqualified from the Third League, after which it was liquidated. Shortly after, some of the legends of the team including Ivan Vasilev, Boycho Velichkov and Anton Velkov formed a new club in A OFG Sofia (city) - north (4th division). The new club, now called Lokomotiv 1929 Sofia, is considered the rightful successor of the previous team, and thus carries over the history and honors won from the original team. The youth academy was also moved to the new club. Some other former players went back to the club, as well as young players from the academy who were selected to the new first squad.

On 29 July 2016, the team was officially approved for the new Bulgarian Second League, skipping one level of Bulgarian football together with Tsarsko Selo Sofia. However, initially the team couldn't get promoted to the First League until 2018–19 season due to the rule that a team can play in the highest level only after 3 seasons of existence. This was changed later, allowing Lokomotiv to promote as early as 2018, since the new team was considered to be the successor of the original Lokomotiv.

The 2017–18 season was very dramatic for Lokomotiv Sofia. The team finished second in the Second League, qualifying for the promotion playoffs to enter First League. However, they were denied entry to the top tier by Vitosha Bistritsa, who beat Lokomotiv on penalties to stay in the league. Next season wasn't as successful, with Lokomotiv only managing a mid-table result. For the 2019–20 season, Lokomotiv finished fourth, only three points behind Montana, who qualified for the promotion playoffs.

The 2020–21 season began well for Lokomotiv, as they managed to remain in first place in the league for the majority of the season before the winter break. Lokomotiv eventually managed to finish in second place, thus securing promotion to the First League after six years of absence when counting the records of the former entity.

The first season since returning to the top level proved to be difficult. Lokomotiv, however, managed to secure their place in the league after a lot of drama in the relegation group of the 2021–22 season. The team eventually finished above Botev Vratsa and Tsarsko Selo, avoiding the drop. After the season ended, Lokomotiv announced that they had parted ways with Ivan Kolev and had appointed former Ludogorets manager Stanislav Genchev in his place, with Zhivko Milanov as assistant coach. Lokomotiv then experienced a more successful 2022–23 season, managing to finish within the Europa Conference League group of the table. Overall, Lokomotiv finished the season in ninth place. At the end of the season, Genchev left the club, and was replaced by Stoycho Stoev. Stoev did not manage to impress with good results at the start of the 2023–24 season, and was fired in September. He was replaced by former player Danilo Dončić. The team saw mixed results under Dončić, eventually finishing the regular season in the relegation group. Dončić was replaced by Bulgarian legend Krasimir Balakov towards the end of the season.

In begin of Jule 2024 Ivan Vasilev left Lokomotiv giving 100% of ownership to Veselin Stoianov.

== Honours ==
=== Domestic ===
- First League:
  - Winners (4): 1939–40, 1945, 1963–64, 1977–78
- Bulgarian Cup:
  - Winners (4): 1948, 1953, 1981–82, 1994–95

=== European ===
- Europa League:
  - Quarter-finals: 1980
- Balkans Cup:
  - Winners: 1973
- European Railways Cup
  - Winners (2): 1961, 1963

== Crest, shirt and mascot ==
Team main kit is red and black. Away kits are black and white.

Period	Kit manufacturer	Shirt partner
2014–2017	(Spain) Joma	Casa Boyana
2017–2021	(Spain) Joma	Efbet
2022–2024	(Spain) Joma	Betano
2024 -	(Spain) Joma	8888

On 11 February 2022 Lokomotiv signed a sponsorship contract with the Greek betting company Betano for 3 years.

== Players ==
=== Current squad ===
As of 31 August 2026

Note: Flags indicate national team as defined under FIFA eligibility rules; some limited exceptions apply. Players may hold more than one non-FIFA nationality.

No.	Pos.	Nation	Player
3	DF	BUL	Kaloyan Kostov
5	MF	BUL	Erol Dost
6	DF	POR	António Eirô
7	FW	BUL	Spas Delev
8	MF	BUL	Ivan Yordanov (on loan from Ludogorets)
9	FW	BUL	Georgi Minchev
11	MF	FRA	Adil Taoui
14	DF	BUL	Angel Lyaskov
16	MF	FRA	Mohamed Medfai
17	FW	BUL	Mark-Emilio Papazov
18	FW	COD	Katulondi Kati
20	MF	BUL	Dimitar Kostadinov
21	MF	BUL	Kristian Chachev

No.	Pos.	Nation	Player
22	DF	BUL	Reyan Daskalov
23	DF	NGR	David Ogaga
24	GK	BUL	Aleksandar Lyubenov
26	MF	BUL	Krasimir Miloshev
29	FW	CRO	Ante Aralica
31	MF	BUL	Krasimir Stanoev
42	DF	BUL	Nikola Neychev
44	DF	BUL	Bozhidar Katsarov
71	FW	BUL	Nicholas Penev
77	FW	BRA	Cauê Caruso
91	DF	CGO	Ryan Bidounga
99	GK	BUL	Martin Velichkov

For recent transfers, see List of Bulgarian football transfers summer 2026.

=== Foreign players ===
Up to twenty foreign nationals can be registered and given a squad number for the first team in the Bulgarian First League, however only five non-EU nationals can be used during a match day. Those non-EU nationals with European ancestry can claim citizenship from the nation their ancestors came from. If a player does not have European ancestry he can claim Bulgarian citizenship after playing in Bulgaria for 5 years.

EU Nationals

- (Croatia) Ante Aralica
- (Portugal) António Eirô

EU Nationals (Dual citizenship)

- (Republic of the Congo) (France) Ryan Bidounga
- (Brazil) (Italy) Cauê Caruso
- (France) (Algeria) Adil Taoui
- (France) (Tunisia) Mohamed Medfai

Non-EU Nationals

- (Democratic Republic of the Congo) Katulondi Kati
- (Nigeria) David Ogaga

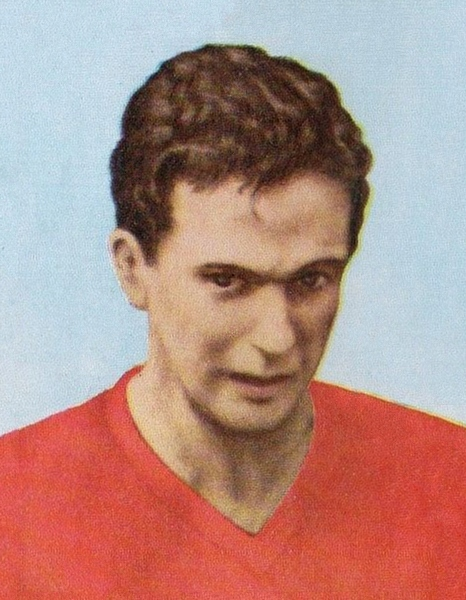
Atanas Mihaylov is Lokomotiv's all-time highest goalscorer.

== Statistics and records ==
Lokomotiv's first competitive game was a 2–1 victory against Zora Sofia on 3 November 1929. Atanas Mihaylov holds Lokomotiv's overall appearance record—he played 348 matches over the course of 17 seasons from 1964 to 1981. Lokomotiv's all-time leading scorer again is Atanas Mihaylov, who scored 145 goals. The most goals scored by a player in a single match is six; Tsvetan Genkov have achieved this feat in 2007.

Lokomotiv's biggest victory is 11–1 against Chavdar Byala Slatina in 1991 for Bulgarian Cup. Lokomotiv's 9–0 defeat of Chernomorets Burgas Sofia on 27 May 2007 was its largest league win. Lokomotiv's heaviest defeat, 0–8, came against Levski Sofia in 1994. Lokomotiv's 6–0 win against Neftchi Baku in the UEFA Cup was the largest victory in the Europe competition's history at the time.

== Goalscoring and appearance records ==
Most appearances for the club in First League

Rank	Name	Career	Appearances
1	(Bulgaria) Yordan Stoykov	1971–1983	326
2	(Bulgaria) Atanas Mihaylov	1965–1968; 1971–1981	306
3	(Bulgaria) Aleksandar Dudov	1982–1994	302
4	(Bulgaria) Dimitar Vasev	1983–1996; 1998–2000	300
5	(Bulgaria) Georgi Bonev	1971–1972; 1974–1985	294
6	(Bulgaria) Apostol Chachevski	1950–1967	289
7	(Bulgaria) Nikola Kotkov	1956–1968	276
–	(Bulgaria) Spiro Debarski	1957–1968	276
9	(Bulgaria) Boycho Velichkov	1975–1986	271
10	(Bulgaria) Trayko Sokolov	1972–1982	257

Most goals for the club in First League

Rank	Name	Career	Goals
1	(Bulgaria) Nikola Kotkov	1956–1968	143
2	(Bulgaria) Atanas Mihaylov	1965–1968; 1971–1981	131
3	(Bulgaria) Boycho Velichkov	1975–1986	90
4	(Bulgaria) Spiro Debarski	1957–1968	84
5	(Bulgaria) Tsvetan Genkov	2004–2007; 2010	65
6	(Bulgaria) Stoycho Stoev	1980–1989	59
7	(Bulgaria) Gosho Petkov	1984–1990	56
8	(Bulgaria) Marcho Dafchev	1998–2001; 2004–2012	55
9	(Bulgaria) Petar Argirov	1947–1956	49
10	(Bulgaria) Kiril Metkov	1983–1991	43

- Players in **bold** are still playing for Lokomotiv.

== Notable players ==
Had international caps for their respective countries, held any club record, or have more than 100 league appearance. Players whose name is listed in bold represented their countries.

Bulgaria

- (Bulgaria) **Antonio Ananiev**
- (Bulgaria) **Ivaylo Andonov**
- (Bulgaria) **Diyan Angelov**
- (Bulgaria) **Sasho Angelov**
- (Bulgaria) **Georgi Antonov**
- (Bulgaria) **Viden Apostolov**
- (Bulgaria) **Petar Argirov**
- (Bulgaria) Dimo Atanasov
- (Bulgaria) **Ivan Bandalovski**
- (Bulgaria) **Krum Bibishkov**
- (Bulgaria) **Kostadin Blagoev**
- (Bulgaria) **Georgi Borisov**
- (Bulgaria) **Krasimir Borisov**
- (Bulgaria) **Ivan Boyadzhiev**
- (Bulgaria) **Simeon Chilibonov**
- (Bulgaria) **Marcho Dafchev**
- (Bulgaria) **Spiro Debarski**
- (Bulgaria) **Ivan Deyanov**
- (Bulgaria) **Boko Dimitrov**
- (Bulgaria) **Ivan Dimitrov**
- (Bulgaria) **Velizar Dimitrov**
- (Bulgaria) **Zdravko Dimitrov**
- (Bulgaria) Kristiyan Dobrev
- (Bulgaria) **Pavel Dochev**
- (Bulgaria) **Diyan Donchev**
- (Bulgaria) **Doncho Donev**
- (Bulgaria) **Nikolay Donev**
- (Bulgaria) **Svetoslav Dyakov**
- (Bulgaria) **Georgi Eftimov**
- (Bulgaria) **Anton Evtimov**
- (Bulgaria) Gancho Evtimov
- (Bulgaria) Valentin Galev
- (Bulgaria) **Emil Gargorov**
- (Bulgaria) **Tsvetan Genkov**
- (Bulgaria) **Ivaylo Georgiev**
- (Bulgaria) **Atanas Gerov**
- (Bulgaria) **Rumyancho Goranov**
- (Bulgaria) **Iliya Gruev**
- (Bulgaria) **Kamen Hadzhiev**
- (Bulgaria) **Kostadin Hazurov**
- (Bulgaria) **Lyubomir Hranov**
- (Bulgaria) **Georgi Hristakiev**
- (Bulgaria) **Lazar Hristov**
- (Bulgaria) **Rumen Hristov**
- (Bulgaria) **Ventsislav Hristov**
- (Bulgaria) **Boris Hvoynev**
- (Bulgaria) **Dimitar Iliev**
- (Bulgaria) **Georgi Iliev**
- (Bulgaria) Ivo
- (Bulgaria) **Vladimir Ivanov**
- (Bulgaria) **Martin Kamburov**
- (Bulgaria) **Kaloyan Karadzhinov**
- (Bulgaria) **Hristo Koilov**
- (Bulgaria) **Angel Kolev**
- (Bulgaria) **Todor Kolev**
- (Bulgaria) **Stanislav Kostov**
- (Bulgaria) **Nikola Kotkov**
- (Bulgaria) **Petar Kurdov**
- (Bulgaria) Aleksandar Lyubenov
- (Bulgaria) **Vladimir Manchev**
- (Bulgaria) **Aleksandar Markov**
- (Bulgaria) **Georgi Markov**
- (Bulgaria) **Marquinhos**
- (Bulgaria) **Kiril Metkov**
- (Bulgaria) **Vasil Metodiev**
- (Bulgaria) **Atanas Mihaylov**
- (Bulgaria) **Krum Milev**
- (Bulgaria) Krasimir Miloshev
- (Bulgaria) **Dobromir Mitov**
- (Bulgaria) **Bozhidar Mitrev**
- (Bulgaria) **Anatoli Nankov**
- (Bulgaria) **Valentin Naydenov**
- (Bulgaria) **Plamen Nikolov**
- (Bulgaria) **Malin Orachev**
- (Bulgaria) **Miki Orachev**
- (Bulgaria) **Stoyan Ormandzhiev**
- (Bulgaria) **Ivan Paskov**
- (Bulgaria) **Viktorio Pavlov**
- (Bulgaria) **Georgi Peev**
- (Bulgaria) **Dimitar Penev**
- (Bulgaria) **Diyan Petkov**
- (Bulgaria) **Traycho Petkov**
- (Bulgaria) **Yordan Petkov**
- (Bulgaria) **Svetoslav Petrov**
- (Bulgaria) **Yasen Petrov**
- (Bulgaria) **Boyan Peykov**
- (Bulgaria) **Dimitar Popov**
- (Bulgaria) **Milen Radukanov**
- (Bulgaria) **Martin Raynov**
- (Bulgaria) **Vladislav Romanov**
- (Bulgaria) **Vladko Shalamanov**
- (Bulgaria) **Zahari Sirakov**
- (Bulgaria) **Ivo Slavchev**
- (Bulgaria) **Simeon Slavchev**
- (Bulgaria) **Iliyan Stefanov**
- (Bulgaria) **Stoycho Stoev**
- (Bulgaria) **Vladimir Stoyanov**
- (Bulgaria) **Yordan Stoykov**
- (Bulgaria) **Lachezar Tanev**
- (Bulgaria) **Dimitar Telkiyski**
- (Bulgaria) **Nikolay Todorov**
- (Bulgaria) **Yordan Todorov**
- (Bulgaria) **Marius Urukov**
- (Bulgaria) **Mihail Valchev**
- (Bulgaria) **Iliya Valov**
- (Bulgaria) **Dimitar Vasev**
- (Bulgaria) **Kiril Vasilev**
- (Bulgaria) **Boycho Velichkov**
- (Bulgaria) Anton Velkov
- (Bulgaria) **Dimitar Velkovski**
- (Bulgaria) **Antonio Vutov**
- (Bulgaria) **Kosta Yanev**
- (Bulgaria) **Zlatko Yankov**
- (Bulgaria) **Vladimir Yonkov**
- (Bulgaria) **Preslav Yordanov**
- (Bulgaria) **Yordan Yosifov**
- (Bulgaria) **Hristo Yovov**
- (Bulgaria) **Adalbert Zafirov**
- (Bulgaria) **Antoni Zdravkov**
- (Bulgaria) **Radoslav Zdravkov**
- (Bulgaria) **Nasko Zhelev**
- (Bulgaria) **Hristo Zlatinski**

Europe

- (Kosovo) **Zenun Selimi**
- (North Macedonia) **Zoran Baldovaliev**
- (North Macedonia) **Andreja Efremov**
- (Malta) **Daniel Bogdanović**
- (Malta) **Stefan Giglio**
- (Montenegro) **Milan Jovanović**
- (Serbia) Uroš Golubović
- (Serbia) Darko Savić
- (Socialist Federal Republic of Yugoslavia) **Goran Vasilijević**

Africa

- (Benin) **Steve Traoré**
- (Chad) **Azrack Mahamat**
- (The Gambia) **Baboucarr Gaye**
- (Ghana) **Derek Asamoah**
- (Guinea-Bissau) **Lino**
- (Mozambique) **David Malembana**
- (South Africa) **MacDonald Mukansi**
- (Tunisia) **Lamjed Chehoudi**
- (Tunisia) **Nabil Taïder**

South America

- (Brazil) Tom

== Past seasons ==
Results of league and cup competitions by season
Season	League											Bulgarian Cup	Other competitions	Top goalscorer	
Season	Division	Level	P	W	D	L	F	A	GD	Pts	Pos	Bulgarian Cup	Other competitions	Top goalscorer	
2014–15	A Group	1	22	12	3	7	29	24	+5	39	3rd ↓	Quarter-finals		(Tunisia) Lamjed Chehoudi	9+2
2015–16	A Regional League	4	20	20	0	0	142	8	+139	60	1st ↑	Not qualified		(Bulgaria) Kaloyan Bonev	47
2016–17	Second League	2	30	13	8	9	47	34	+12	47	6th	Second Round		(Bulgaria) Dimitar Georgiev	18
2017–18	Second League	2	30	19	6	5	44	18	+26	62	2nd	Second Round		(Bulgaria) Iliya Dimitrov	17
2018–19	Second League	2	30	9	9	12	25	28	–3	36	8th	Second Round		(Bulgaria) Tsvetomir Vachev (Bulgaria) Aleksandar Aleksandrov	5
2019–20	Second League	2	21	12	3	6	36	18	+18	39	4th	Preliminary round		(Bulgaria) Svetoslav Dikov	9
2020–21	Second League	2	30	19	5	6	65	30	+35	62	2nd ↑	Preliminary round		(Bulgaria) Svetoslav Dikov	23
2021–22	First League	1	32	8	10	14	27	46	–19	34	11th	Round of 16		(Brazil) Octávio	9
2022–23	First League	1	36	11	9	16	37	49	–12	42	9th	Semi-finals		(Bulgaria) Dimitar Mitkov	7
2023–24	First League	1	35	12	11	6	18	30	58	-28	12th	Qualified		(Bulgaria) Dimitar Mitkov	5+1

Key

Champions	Runners-up	Promoted	Relegated

== European record ==
Competition	S	P	W	D	L	GF	GA	GD
UEFA Champions League / European Cup	2	8	3	1	4	19	21	– 2
UEFA Cup Winners' Cup / European Cup Winners' Cup	3	8	3	0	5	8	17	– 9
UEFA Europa League / UEFA Cup	8	34	12	11	11	49	37	+ 12
Total	13	50	18	12	20	76	75	+ 1

== Managers ==
Dates	Name	Honours
2015–2016	(Bulgaria) Anton Velkov	
2016	(Bulgaria) Angel Kolev /interim/	
2017	(Bulgaria) Yavor Valchinov	
2017–2018	(Serbia) Mladen Dodić	
2018	(Bulgaria) Angel Kolev	
2019	(Serbia) Mladen Dodić	
2019–2020	(Bulgaria) Radoslav Zdravkov	
2020–2022	(Bulgaria) Ivan Kolev	
2022–2023	(Bulgaria) Stanislav Genchev	
2023	(Bulgaria) Stoycho Stoev	
2023–2024	(Serbia) Danilo Dončić	
2024	(Bulgaria) Krasimir Balakov	
2024–2025	(Bulgaria) Anton Velkov	
2025–2026	(Bulgaria) Stanislav Genchev	

== Supporters ==
Lokomotiv has a group of loyal fans known as Iron Brigades (Bulgarian: Железни бригади) who supported the team in the lowest levels of the Bulgarian football. Lokomotiv's biggest rivalry is with Slavia Sofia. Lokomotiv's fans maintain a friendship with Spartak Varna and Austrian club FavAC.
