= Atanas Aleksandrov =

Bulgarian footballer

Personal information
- Full name: Atanas Borislavov Aleksandrov
- Date of birth: 2 June 1952
- Place of birth: Mihaylovo, Bulgaria
- Date of death: 11 April 2004 (aged 51)
- Position: Midfielder

Senior career*
Years	Team	Apps	(Gls)
1970–1982	Slavia Sofia		
1982–1983	Omonia Aradippou		

International career
1973–1981	Bulgaria	19	(1)
- * Club domestic league appearances and goals

Atanas Aleksandrov (Bulgarian: Атанас Александров, 2 June 1952 – 11 April 2004) was a Bulgarian football midfielder.
