= Andrey Zhelyazkov =

Bulgarian footballer

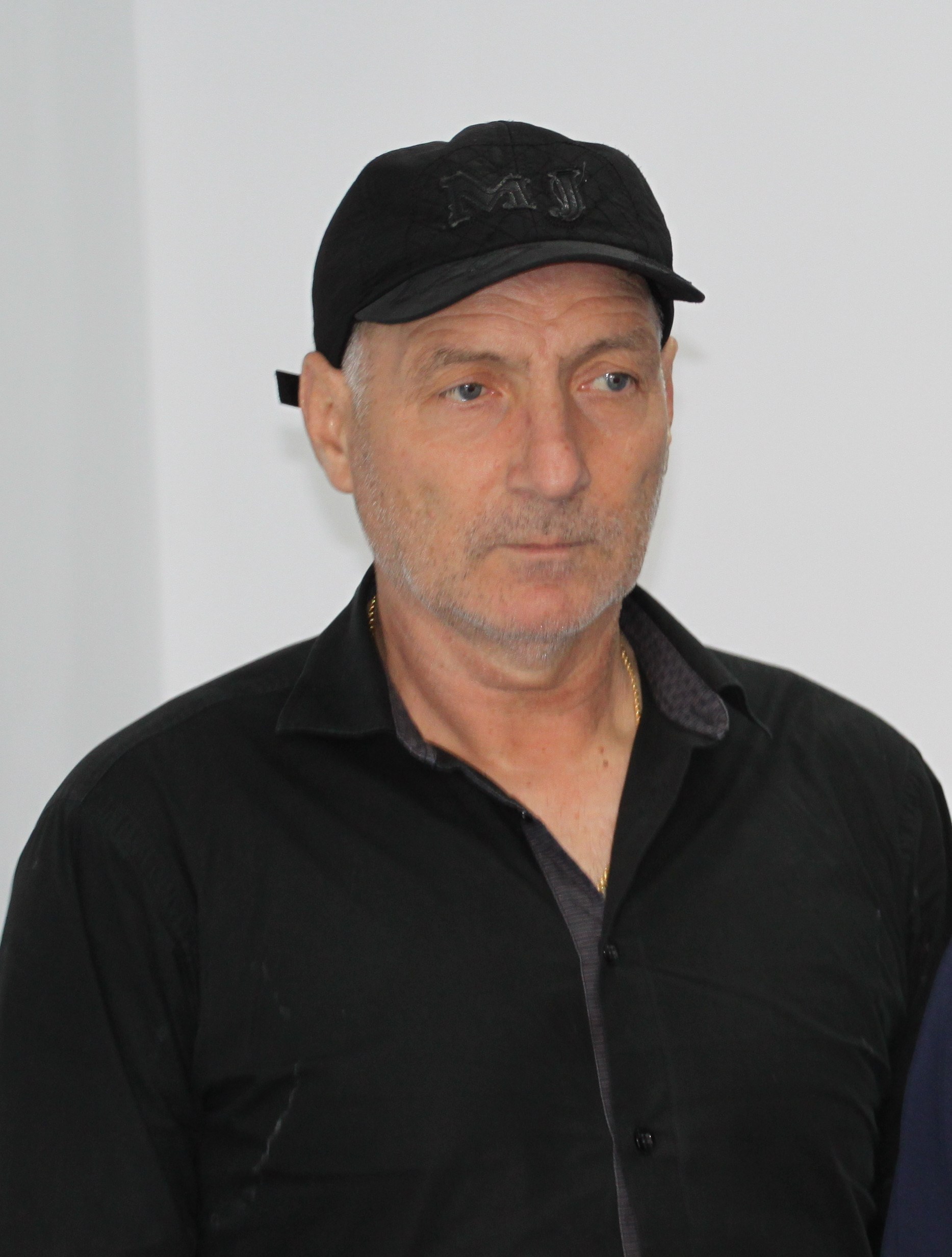

Personal information
- Full name: Andrey Zhelyazkov
- Date of birth: 9 July 1952 (age 74)
- Place of birth: Radnevo, Bulgaria
- Position: Forward

Youth career
- 1960–1969: Minyor Radnevo

Senior career*
Years	Team	Apps	(Gls)
1969–1971	Minyor Radnevo	58	(21)
1971–1981	Slavia Sofia	293	(124)
1981–1984	Feyenoord	76	(30)
1984–1985	Slavia Sofia	23	(6)
1985–1986	RC Strasbourg	33	(1)
1986–1987	Beerschot	32	(1)
1988–1989	Slavia Sofia	22	(4)
Total		537	(187)

International career
1974–1986	Bulgaria	54	(14)

Managerial career
- 1992–1997: Levski Sofia
- 2004: Feyenoord (scout)
- 2012: Ludogorets Razgrad (scout)
- * Club domestic league appearances and goals

Andrey Kolev Zhelyazkov (Bulgarian: Андрей Колев Желязков; born 9 July 1952 in Radnevo) is a former Bulgarian footballer who played as a forward. He spent 12 years of his career playing for Slavia Sofia and is the club's all-time top goalscorer in the A Group with 136 goals. Zhelyazkov is also the most capped player in the history of the club with 338 league appearances. He participated in the 1986 FIFA World Cup.

== Career ==
Zhelyazkov played in his home country for Minyor Radnevo and Slavia Sofia, in the Netherlands for Feyenoord, in France with RC Strasbourg, in Belgium for Beerschot, and for the Bulgaria national football team. With Slavia he won the Bulgarian Cup in 1975 and 1980 and reached the final twice more in 1972 and 1981. He hold Slavia's record for both most caps with 338 and most goals 136.

=== Feyenoord ===
In 1981, Zhelyazkov joined Eredivisie side Feyenoord. During 1983–84 season he formed a successful partnership with Johan Cruijff and Ruud Gullit, which led Feyenoord to the first league title since 1974. They contributed a total of 34 goals in the campaign.

== Honours ==
Slavia Sofia

- Bulgarian Cup: 1975, 1980

Feyenoord

- Eredivisie: 1983–84
- KNVB Cup: 1983–84

Individual

- Bulgarian Footballer of the Year: 1980

Awards
Preceded by Atanas Mihaylov	Bulgarian Footballer of the Year; 1980	Succeeded by Georgi Velinov
