= List of Bulgarian football champions =

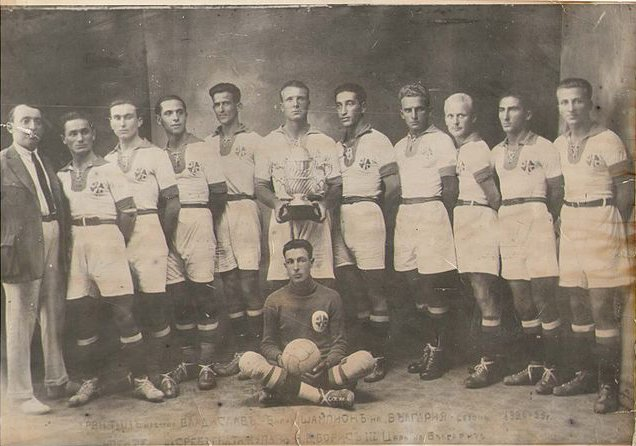
SK Vladislav in 1925, the first Bulgarian football champions.

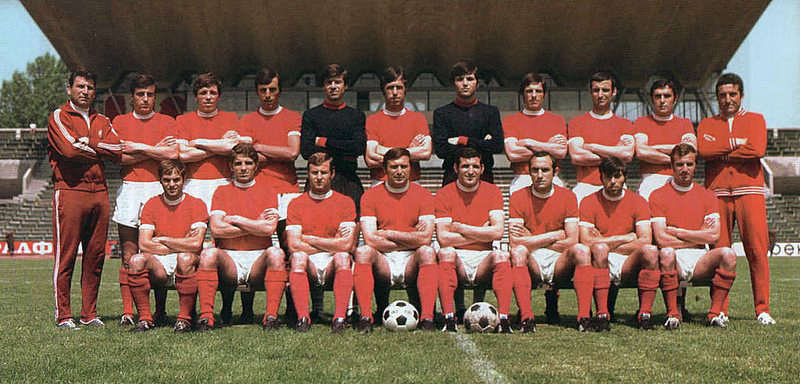
CSKA Sofia, the most successful team in the championship with 31 titles, in 1973

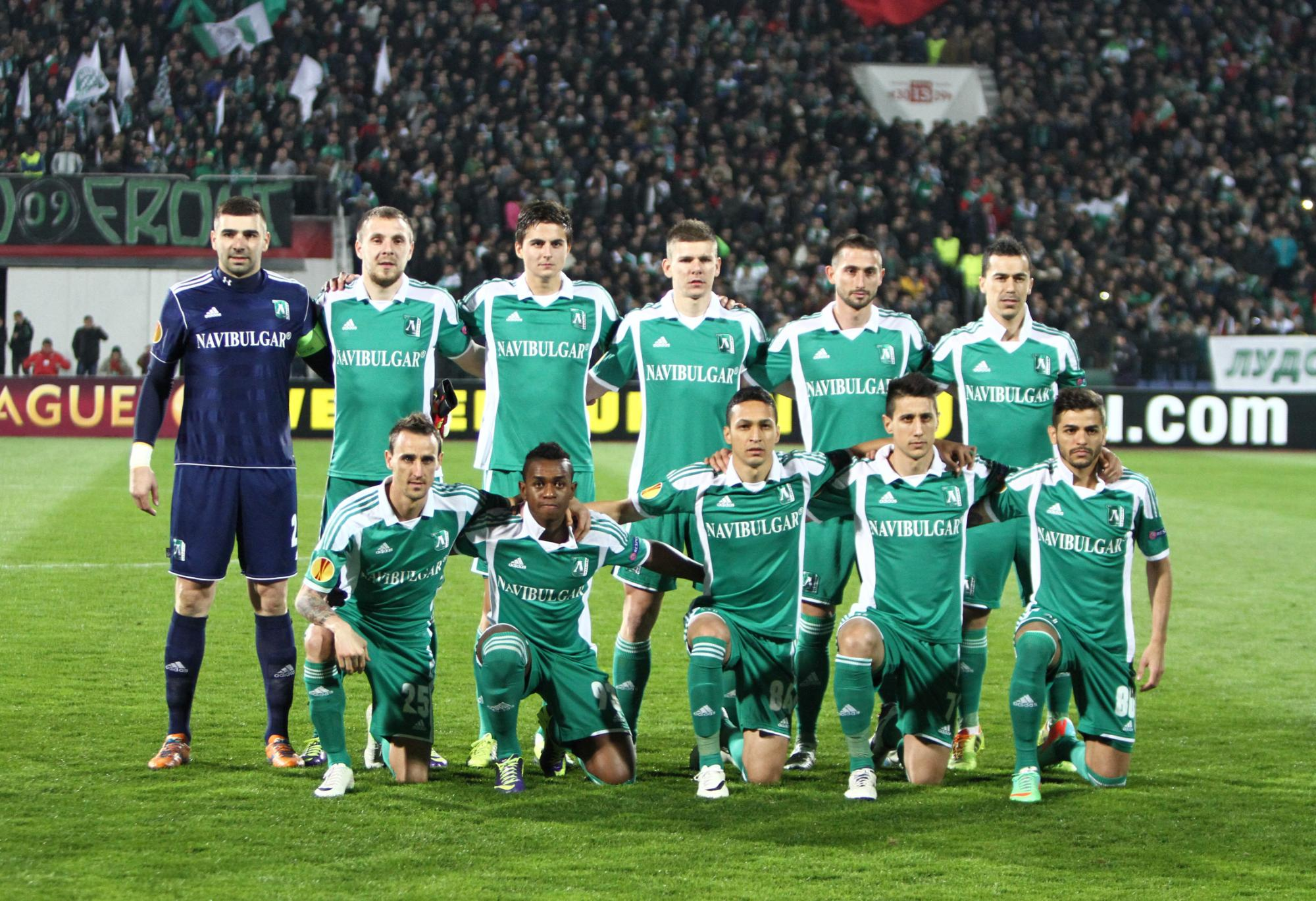
Ludogorets in 2013, joint protagonists of the longest championship streak in Europe (14 consecutive titles).

Bulgarian football champions are those that won the highest league in Bulgarian football, which since 2016–17 is known as the First Professional Football League, or just First League.

The first national football competition in Bulgaria was established in 1924 by the Bulgarian National Sport Federation and was named Bulgarian State Football Championship. The championship was a knockout tournament featuring six clubs that had won six regional divisions. These divisions were round-robin tournaments that included football clubs that were founded in different geographic areas. The winners of each division were drawn in pairs at random for each of the three one-match rounds. Two of the clubs qualified directly for the second round (the semi-final stage) and the other four had to play two quarter-final matches. The championship didn't finish in years 1924, 1927 and 1944 because of different reasons. At the end of the 1925 season, Vladislav Varna were the first club to be crowned champions.

The championship had many changes in its format during the years, mainly in the number of legs played in each round and the number of teams that qualified from the regional divisions. In seasons 1937–38, 1938–39 and 1939–40 the championship was reorganised to a 10 club National Football Division but it proved to be an unsuccessful decision and from season 1940–41 the division was reverted to a knockout tournament.

After 1944 it was replaced by the Republic Championship. It was organised for only four years between 1945 and 1948. The championship was a knockout tournament featuring clubs that had finished at the top of six regional divisions. These divisions were round-robin tournaments that included football clubs from different geographic areas.

CSKA Sofia have won 31 titles, the most of any club. CSKA's rivals, Levski Sofia, are second with 27. Ludogorets Razgrad are third; the team was in a streak of 14 consecutive titles, which is a record in Bulgarian football. The previous record for consecutive titles was held by CSKA Sofia with nine consecutive titles from 1954 until 1962. Slavia Sofia is in fourth place, with 7 titles, 6 of which were won before the Second World War.

== State Championship (1924–1944) ==
Season	Champions (titles)	Runner-up	Third place
1924	Not finished		
1925	Vladislav Varna (1)	Levski Sofia	–
1926	Vladislav Varna (2)	Slavia Sofia	–
1927	Not held		
1928	Slavia Sofia (1)	Vladislav Varna	–
1929	Botev Plovdiv (1)	Levski Sofia	–
1930	Slavia Sofia (2)	Vladislav Varna	–
1931	Atletik-Slava 23 (1)	Spartak Varna	–
1932	Spartak Varna (1)	Slavia Sofia	–
1933	Levski Sofia (1)	Spartak Varna	–
1934	Vladislav Varna (3)	Slavia Sofia	–
1935	Sportklub Sofia (1)	Ticha Varna	–
1936	Slavia Sofia (3)	Ticha Varna	–
1937	Levski Sofia (2)	Levski Ruse	–
1937–38	Ticha Varna (1)	Vladislav Varna	Shipka Sofia
1938–39	Slavia Sofia (4)	Vladislav Varna	Ticha Varna
1939–40	Lokomotiv Sofia (1)	Levski Sofia	Slavia Sofia
1941	Slavia Sofia (5)	Lokomotiv Sofia	–
1942	Levski Sofia (3)	Makedonia Skopie	–
1943	Slavia Sofia (6)	Levski Sofia	–
1944	Not finished		

== Republic Championship (1945–1948) ==
Key

Double winners – i.e. League and Bulgarian Cup winners.

Season	Champions (titles)	Runner-up
1945	Lokomotiv Sofia (2)	Sportist Sofia
1946	Levski Sofia (4)	Lokomotiv Sofia
1947	Levski Sofia (5)	Lokomotiv Sofia
1948	CSKA Sofia (1)	Levski Sofia

== A Grupa (1948–2016)/ First League (2016–present) ==
Key

	League champions also won the Bulgarian Cup, i.e. they completed the domestic Double.
*	League champions also won the Bulgarian Cup and Bulgarian Supercup, i.e. they completed the domestic Treble.

Season	Champions (titles)	Points	Runners-up	Points	Third place	Points	Top scorer(s)	
Season	Champions (titles)	Points	Runners-up	Points	Third place	Points	Player (Club)	Goals
1948–49	Levski Sofia (6)	33	CSKA Sofia	24	Lokomotiv Sofia	21	(Bulgaria) Dimitar Milanov (CSKA Sofia) (Bulgaria) Nedko Nedev (Cherno More)	11
1950	Levski Sofia (7)	29	Slavia Sofia	27	Akademik Sofia	22	(Bulgaria) Lyubomir Hranov (Levski Sofia)	11
1951	CSKA Sofia (2)	37	Spartak Sofia	36	Levski Sofia	26	(Bulgaria) Dimitar Milanov (CSKA Sofia)	14
1952	CSKA Sofia (3)	33	Spartak Sofia	26	Lokomotiv Sofia	25	(Bulgaria) Dimitar Isakov (Slavia Sofia) (Bulgaria) Dobromir Tashkov (Spartak Sofia)	10
1953	Levski Sofia (8)	43	CSKA Sofia	42	Cherno More	31	(Bulgaria) Dimitar Minchev (Spartak Pleven / VVS Sofia)	15
1954	CSKA Sofia (4)	45	Slavia Sofia	38	Lokomotiv Sofia	36	(Bulgaria) Dobromir Tashkov (Slavia Sofia)	25
1955	CSKA Sofia (5)	37	Slavia Sofia	31	Spartak Varna	28	(Bulgaria) Todor Diev (Spartak Plovdiv)	13
1956	CSKA Sofia (6)	31	Levski Sofia	26	Botev Plovdiv	25	(Bulgaria) Pavel Vladimirov (Minyor Pernik)	16
1957	CSKA Sofia (7)	34	Lokomotiv Sofia	33	Levski Sofia	30	(Bulgaria) Hristo Iliev (Levski Sofia) (Bulgaria) Dimitar Milanov (CSKA Sofia)	14
1958	CSKA Sofia (8)	18	Levski Sofia	14	Spartak Pleven	14	(Bulgaria) Dobromir Tashkov (Slavia Sofia) (Bulgaria) Georgi Arnaudov (Spartak Varna)	9
1958–59	CSKA Sofia (9)	32	Slavia Sofia	27	Levski Sofia	24	(Bulgaria) Aleksandar Vasilev (Slavia Sofia)	13
1959–60	CSKA Sofia (10)	32	Levski Sofia	28	Lokomotiv Sofia	23	(Bulgaria) Dimitar Yordanov (Levski Sofia) (Bulgaria) Lyuben Kostov (Spartak Varna)	12
1960–61	CSKA Sofia (11)	40	Levski Sofia	30	Botev Plovdiv	29	(Bulgaria) Ivan Sotirov (Botev Plovdiv)	20
1961–62	CSKA Sofia (12)	41	Spartak Plovdiv	35	Levski Sofia	30	(Bulgaria) Nikola Yordanov (Dunav Ruse) (Bulgaria) Todor Diev (Spartak Plovdiv)	23
1962–63	Spartak Plovdiv (1)	43	Botev Plovdiv	40	CSKA Sofia	37	(Bulgaria) Todor Diev (Spartak Plovdiv)	26
1963–64	Lokomotiv Sofia (3)	44	Levski Sofia	41	Slavia Sofia	35	(Bulgaria) Nikola Tsanev (CSKA Sofia)	26
1964–65	Levski Sofia (9)	42	Lokomotiv Sofia	39	Slavia Sofia	35	(Bulgaria) Georgi Asparuhov (Levski Sofia)	27
1965–66	CSKA Sofia (13)	42	Levski Sofia	41	Slavia Sofia	39	(Bulgaria) Traycho Spasov (Marek)	21
1966–67	Botev Plovdiv (2)	38	Slavia Sofia	37	Levski Sofia	36	(Bulgaria) Petar Zhekov (Beroe)	21
1967–68	Levski Sofia (10)	45	CSKA Sofia	42	Lokomotiv Sofia	40	(Bulgaria) Petar Zhekov (Beroe)	31
1968–69	CSKA Sofia (14)	47	Levski Sofia	40	Lokomotiv Plovdiv	39	(Bulgaria) Petar Zhekov (CSKA Sofia)	36
1969–70	Levski Sofia (11)	50	CSKA Sofia	47	Slavia Sofia	38	(Bulgaria) Petar Zhekov (CSKA Sofia)	31
1970–71	CSKA Sofia (15)	48	Levski Sofia	48	Botev Vratsa	38	(Bulgaria) Dimitar Yakimov (CSKA Sofia)	26
1971–72	CSKA Sofia (16)	58	Levski Sofia	50	Beroe	42	(Bulgaria) Petar Zhekov (CSKA Sofia)	27
1972–73	CSKA Sofia (17)	51	Lokomotiv Plovdiv	43	Slavia Sofia	43	(Bulgaria) Petar Zhekov (CSKA Sofia)	29
1973–74	Levski Sofia (12)	47	CSKA Sofia	46	Lokomotiv Plovdiv	34	(Bulgaria) Petko Petkov (Beroe)	20
1974–75	CSKA Sofia (18)	39	Levski Sofia	38	Slavia Sofia	36	(Bulgaria) Ivan Pritargov (Botev Plovdiv)	20
1975–76	CSKA Sofia (19)	43	Levski Sofia	41	Akademik Sofia	37	(Bulgaria) Petko Petkov (Beroe)	19
1976–77	Levski Sofia (13)	43	CSKA Sofia	39	Marek	38	(Bulgaria) Pavel Panov (Levski Sofia)	20
1977–78	Lokomotiv Sofia (4)	42	CSKA Sofia	41	Levski Sofia	38	(Bulgaria) Stoycho Mladenov (Beroe)	21
1978–79	Levski Sofia (14)	43	CSKA Sofia	40	Lokomotiv Sofia	37	(Bulgaria) Rusi Gochev (Levski Sofia)	19
1979–80	CSKA Sofia (20)	46	Slavia Sofia	45	Levski Sofia	37	(Bulgaria) Spas Dzhevizov (CSKA Sofia)	23
1980–81	CSKA Sofia (21)	40	Levski Sofia	36	Botev Plovdiv	35	(Bulgaria) Georgi Slavkov (Botev Plovdiv)	31
1981–82	CSKA Sofia (22)	47	Levski Sofia	46	Slavia Sofia	35	(Bulgaria) Mihail Valchev (Levski Sofia)	24
1982–83	CSKA Sofia (23)	45	Levski Sofia	42	Botev Plovdiv	38	(Bulgaria) Antim Pehlivanov (Botev Plovdiv)	20
1983–84	Levski Sofia (15)	47	CSKA Sofia	45	Spartak Varna	31	(Bulgaria) Eduard Eranosyan (Lokomotiv Plovdiv)	19
1984–85	Levski Sofia (16)	40	CSKA Sofia	36	Botev Plovdiv	33	(Bulgaria) Plamen Getov (Spartak Pleven)	26
1985–86	Beroe (1)	43	Botev Plovdiv	41	Slavia Sofia	36	(Bulgaria) Atanas Pashev (Botev Plovdiv)	30
1986–87	CSKA Sofia (24)	47	Levski Sofia	44	Botev Plovdiv	39	(Bulgaria) Nasko Sirakov (Levski Sofia)	36
1987–88	Levski Sofia (17)	48	CSKA Sofia	46	Botev Plovdiv	39	(Bulgaria) Nasko Sirakov (Levski Sofia)	28
1988–89	CSKA Sofia (25) *	49	Levski Sofia	39	Etar	34	(Bulgaria) Hristo Stoichkov (CSKA Sofia)	23
1989–90	CSKA Sofia (26)	45	Slavia Sofia	36	Etar	35	(Bulgaria) Hristo Stoichkov (CSKA Sofia)	38
1990–91	Etar (1)	44	CSKA Sofia	37	Slavia Sofia	37	(Bulgaria) Ivaylo Yordanov (Lokomotiv Gorna Oryahovitsa)	21
1991–92	CSKA Sofia (27)	47	Levski Sofia	45	Lokomotiv Plovdiv	37	(Bulgaria) Nasko Sirakov (Levski Sofia)	26
1992–93	Levski Sofia (18)	50	CSKA Sofia	42	Botev Plovdiv	38	(Bulgaria) Plamen Getov (Levski Sofia)	26
1993–94	Levski Sofia (19)	71	CSKA Sofia	54	Botev Plovdiv	50	(Bulgaria) Nasko Sirakov (Levski Sofia)	30
1994–95	Levski Sofia (20)	79	Lokomotiv Sofia	68	Botev Plovdiv	60	(Bulgaria) Petar Mihtarski (CSKA Sofia)	24
1995–96	Slavia Sofia (7)	67	Levski Sofia	62	Lokomotiv Sofia	58	(Bulgaria) Ivo Georgiev (Spartak Varna)	21
1996–97	CSKA Sofia (28)	71	Neftochimic	67	Slavia Sofia	57	(Bulgaria) Todor Pramatarov (Slavia Sofia)	26
1997–98	Lovech (1)	69	Levski Sofia	64	CSKA Sofia	61	(Bulgaria) Anton Spasov (Neftochimic) (Bulgaria) Boncho Genchev (CSKA Sofia)	17
1998–99	Lovech (2)	73	Levski Sofia	71	Velbazhd	57	(Bulgaria) Dimcho Belyakov (Lovech)	21
1999–00	Levski Sofia (21)	74	CSKA Sofia	64	Velbazhd	55	(Bulgaria) Mihail Mihaylov (Velbazhd)	20
2000–01	Levski Sofia (22)	69	CSKA Sofia	62	Velbazhd	57	(Bulgaria) Hristo Yovov (Lovech) (Bulgaria) Georgi Ivanov (Levski Sofia)	22
2001–02	Levski Sofia (23)	56	Lovech	50	CSKA Sofia	38	(Bulgaria) Vladimir Manchev (CSKA Sofia)	21
2002–03	CSKA Sofia (29)	66	Levski Sofia	60	Lovech	55	(Bulgaria) Georgi Chilikov (Levski Sofia)	23
2003–04	Lokomotiv Plovdiv (1)	75	Levski Sofia	72	CSKA Sofia	65	(Bulgaria) Martin Kamburov (Lokomotiv Plovdiv)	25
2004–05	CSKA Sofia (30)	79	Levski Sofia	76	Lokomotiv Plovdiv	58	(Bulgaria) Martin Kamburov (Lokomotiv Plovdiv)	27
2005–06	Levski Sofia (24)	68	CSKA Sofia	65	Lovech	60	(Slovenia) Milivoje Novaković (Lovech) (Cape Verde) José Furtado (Vihren / CSKA Sofia)	16
2006–07	Levski Sofia (25) *	77	CSKA Sofia	72	Lokomotiv Sofia	72	(Bulgaria) Tsvetan Genkov (Lokomotiv Sofia)	27
2007–08	CSKA Sofia (31)	78	Levski Sofia	62	Lokomotiv Sofia	57	(Bulgaria) Georgi Hristov (Botev Plovdiv)	19
2008–09	Levski Sofia (26)	69	CSKA Sofia	68	Cherno More	60	(Bulgaria) Martin Kamburov (Lokomotiv Sofia)	17
2009–10	Lovech (3)	70	CSKA Sofia	58	Levski Sofia	57	(France) Wilfried Niflore (Lovech)	19
2010–11	Lovech (4)	75	Levski Sofia	72	CSKA Sofia	61	(Mali) Garra Dembélé (Levski Sofia)	26
2011–12	Ludogorets (1) *	70	CSKA Sofia	69	Levski Sofia	62	(Bulgaria) Ivan Stoyanov (Ludogorets) (Brazil) Júnior Moraes (CSKA Sofia)	16
2012–13	Ludogorets (2)	72	Levski Sofia	71	CSKA Sofia	63	(Guinea-Bissau) Basile de Carvalho (Levski Sofia)	19
2013–14	Ludogorets (3) *	84	CSKA Sofia	72	Lovech	72	(Bulgaria) Martin Kamburov (Lokomotiv Plovdiv) (Colombia) Wilmar Jordán (Lovech)	20
2014–15	Ludogorets (4)	63	Beroe	55	Lokomotiv Sofia	55	(Spain) Añete (Levski Sofia)	14
2015–16	Ludogorets (5)	70	Levski Sofia	56	Beroe	53	(Bulgaria) Martin Kamburov (Lokomotiv Plovdiv)	18
2016–17	Ludogorets (6)	83	CSKA Sofia	67	Levski Sofia	63	(Romania) Claudiu Keșerü (Ludogorets)	22
2017–18	Ludogorets (7)	88	CSKA Sofia	81	Levski Sofia	64	(Romania) Claudiu Keșerü (Ludogorets)	26
2018–19	Ludogorets (8)	79	CSKA Sofia	78	Levski Sofia	66	(Bulgaria) Stanislav Kostov (Levski Sofia)	24
2019–20	Ludogorets (9)	72	CSKA Sofia	59	Slavia Sofia	55	(Bulgaria) Martin Kamburov (Beroe)	18
2020–21	Ludogorets (10)	70	Lokomotiv Plovdiv	61	CSKA Sofia	59	(Romania) Claudiu Keșerü (Ludogorets)	18
2021–22	Ludogorets (11)	79	CSKA Sofia	58	Botev Plovdiv	53	(Cyprus) Pieros Sotiriou (Ludogorets)	17
2022–23	Ludogorets (12) *	85	CSKA Sofia	84	CSKA 1948	64	(Bulgaria) Ivaylo Chochev (CSKA 1948)	21
2023–24	Ludogorets (13)	82	Cherno More	75	CSKA Sofia	67	(Bulgaria) Aleksandar Kolev (Krumovgrad)	15
2024–25	Ludogorets (14) *	83	Levski Sofia	72	Cherno More	59	(Argentina) Santiago Godoy (Beroe)	18
2025–26	Levski Sofia (27)	81	CSKA 1948	67	Ludogorets	67	(Brazil) Everton Bala (Levski Sofia) (Mauritania) Mamadou Diallo (CSKA 1948)	18

== Performances ==
=== By club ===
Titles won by club (%)
1. CSKA Sofia – 31 (31.0%)
2. Levski – 27 (27.0%)
3. Ludogorets – 14 (14.0%)
4. Slavia – 7 (7.00%)
5. Lovech – 4 (4.00%)
6. Lokomotiv Sofia – 4 (4.00%)
7. Vladislav – 3 (3.00%)
8. Botev Plovdiv – 2 (2.00%)
9. Other clubs – 8 (8.00%)
- Clubs participating in the 2026–27 Parva Liga are denoted in **bold**.
- Defunct clubs are denoted in italics.

Club	Winners	Winning seasons
**CSKA Sofia**	31	1948, 1951, 1952, 1954, 1955, 1956, 1957, 1958, 1958–59, 1959–60, 1960–61, 1961–62, 1965–66, 1968–69, 1970–71, 1971–72, 1972–73, 1974–75, 1975–76, 1979–80, 1980–81, 1981–82, 1982–83, 1986–87, 1988–89, 1989–90, 1991–92, 1996–97, 2002–03, 2004–05, 2007–08
**Levski Sofia**	27	1933, 1937, 1942, 1946, 1947, 1948–49, 1950, 1953, 1964–65, 1967–68, 1969–70, 1973–74, 1976–77, 1978–79, 1983–84, 1984–85, 1987–88, 1992–93, 1993–94, 1994–95, 1999–2000, 2000–01, 2001–02, 2005–06, 2006–07, 2008–09, 2025–26
**Ludogorets**	14	2011–12, 2012–13, 2013–14, 2014–15, 2015–16, 2016–17, 2017–18, 2018–19, 2019–20, 2020–21, 2021–22, 2022–23, 2023–24, 2024–25
**Slavia Sofia**	7	1928, 1930, 1936, 1939, 1941, 1943, 1995–96
Lovech	4	1997–98, 1998–99, 2009–10, 2010–11
**Lokomotiv Sofia**	4	1939–40, 1945, 1963–64, 1977–78
Vladislav	3	1925, 1926, 1934, 1937–38
**Botev Plovdiv**	2	1929, 1966–67
AS-23	1	1931
Beroe	1	1985–86
Etar	1	1990–91
**Lokomotiv Plovdiv**	1	2003–04
**Spartak Varna**	1	1932
Spartak Plovdiv	1	1962–63
Sportklub	1	1935
Ticha	1	1937–38

Notes:

- CSKA Sofia titles include those won as Septemvri pri CDNV, CDNA, CFKA-Sredets.
- Levski Sofia titles include those won as Dinamo, Levski-Spartak, Vitosha.
- Cherno More titles include those won as Vladislav Varna, Ticha Varna.
- Botev Plovdiv titles include those won as Trakia.
- Spartak Varna titles include those won as Shipchenski Sokol.

=== By city ===
Location of Bulgarian football champions

The following table lists the Bulgarian champions by cities.

City	Titles	Clubs (titles)	Last title
Sofia	70	**CSKA** (31), **Levski** (27), **Slavia** (7), **Lokomotiv** (4), Sportklub (1)	2025–26 (Levski)
Razgrad	14	**Ludogorets** (14)	2024–25 (Ludogorets)
Varna	5	Vladislav (3), Ticha (1), **Spartak** (1)	1937–38 (Ticha)
Plovdiv	4	**Botev** (2), **Lokomotiv** (1), Spartak (1)	2003–04 (Lokomotiv)
Lovech	4	Lovech (4)	2010–11 (Lovech)
Stara Zagora	1	Beroe (1)	1985–86 (Beroe)
Veliko Tarnovo	1	Etar (1)	1990–91 (Etar)
