= First Professional Football League (Bulgaria) =

Association football league in Bulgaria

- Organising body: Bulgarian Football Union (BFU); Bulgarian Professional Football League (BPFL)
- Founded: 1924; 102 years ago (knockout); 1937–1940; 1948 (as round-robin)
- Country: Bulgaria
- Confederation: UEFA
- Number of clubs: 14
- Level on pyramid: 1
- Relegation to: Second League
- Domestic cup(s): Bulgarian Cup; Bulgarian Pro Cup; Bulgarian Supercup
- International cup(s): UEFA Champions League; UEFA Europa League; UEFA Conference League
- Current champions: Levski Sofia (27th title) (2025–26)
- Most championships: CSKA Sofia (31 titles)
- Most appearances: Georgi Iliev (461)
- Top scorer: Martin Kamburov (256 goals)
- Broadcaster: Nova Broadcasting Group
- Website: fpleague.bg
- Current: 2026–27 season

The First Professional Football League (Bulgarian: Първа професионална футболна лига, romanized: Parva Profesionalna Futbolna Liga), commonly known as Parva Liga or Bulgarian First League (currently known as the efbet League for sponsorship reasons), is a professional association football league in Bulgaria and the highest level of the Bulgarian football league system. Contested by 14 teams, it operates on a system of promotion and relegation with the Second Professional Football League.

The Bulgarian football championship was inaugurated in 1924 as the Bulgarian State Football Championship and has been played in a league format since 1948, when the A Group was established. The champions of the First League have the right to participate in the qualifying rounds of the UEFA Champions League based on the league's European coefficient. Additionally, two UEFA Europa Conference League spots are allocated to the second team in the final standings and the winner of the European playoffs. A further fourth spot may also be granted to the fourth placed team in the final league ranking, given that the Bulgarian Cup holder has finished among the top three teams at the end of the season.

A total of 75 clubs have competed in the Bulgarian top-tier since its establishment, with FC Krumovgrad being the newest member of the top tier, after promotion in 2023. Since 1948, eleven different teams have been crowned champions of Bulgaria. The three most successful clubs are CSKA Sofia with 31 titles, Levski Sofia with 27 titles and Ludogorets Razgrad with 14 titles. Historically, the competition has been dominated by Sofia-based teams. Together they have won a total number of 70 titles.

== History ==
=== Foundation ===
The first football championship in Bulgaria was held in 1924 as a knockout tournament. It was organised by the Bulgarian National Sports Federation (BNSF). The six inaugural teams were Vladislav Varna, Orel Vratsa, Levski Sofia, Krakra Pernik, Pobeda Plovdiv and Chernomorets Burgas, each having won and representing its regional sports federation, called sportna federatsiya. The championship was abandoned, because of a dispute between Vladislav and Levski over the replay of the final game. In the following 1925 season, SK Vladislav became the first champion of Bulgaria. The championship was reorganised for three seasons, from season 1937–38 to 1939–40, ten teams participated in a round-robin tournament, called the National Football Division.

=== A Republican Football Group ===
The inaugural season of the A Republican Football Group began in the autumn of 1948. The ten teams participating in the league were Levski, Septemvri, Lokomotiv, Slavia and Spartak from the capital city Sofia, and Botev Varna, Botev Burgas, Slavia Plovdiv, Marek Stanke Dimitrov, Benkovski in a spring-autumn cycle like in the Soviet Union. In the autumn of 1949, qualification tournaments were played to determine the teams that would play in the next 1950 season. In the next two seasons the number of teams in the league was increased to 12, and for the 1953 season there were 15 teams (the 16th team was the Bulgaria national team). In seasons 1954 and 1955 there were 14 teams in the league, and in seasons 1956 and 1957 there were 10.

In 1958, the championship was again stopped after the spring half-season, as had happened in 1948. New re-organizations were accepted and the league was again going to be played in the autumn-spring format. Despite the fact that the teams had played just 1 match, CDNA was crowned as the champion of Bulgaria.

The frequent changes in the number of teams in A Group continued in the 1960s. In the first two seasons after the reforms in 1958, the number of teams in the league was 12, in the period 1960–1962 – 14, until season 1967/68, when the teams were 16.

There were new reforms at the end of the 1960s. There were many mergers between Bulgarian clubs. The most-famous are between CSKA Red Flag and Septemvri Sofia in CSKA September Flag, the capital teams Levski and Spartak in Levski-Spartak, Lokomotiv and Slavia in Slavia, the Plovdiv teams Botev, Spartak and Academic in Trakiya. Mergers happened between other Bulgarian clubs too. These mergers between clubs and reforms in A Group were made at the winter break of the 1968/69 season.

After the winter reforms in 1968 until 2000, A Group remained with 16 teams, except in seasons 1971/72 and 1972/73, when 18 teams competed in the league.

=== Premier Professional Football League ===
The Bulgarian Football Union decided to make reforms. The Premier Professional Football League, created in the autumn of 2000, had 14 teams participating in it. At the end of the 2000/01 season, the last two teams were directly relegated to the lower division and the team that finished 12th had the chance to compete in the promotion/relegation play-off for the remaining place in the league. Levski Sofia became champions in the first season of the Premier League.

In the 2001/02 season there was experimentation with the regulations. The championship was divided into two phases. In the first phase the teams played a regular season, each team playing twice against all the others, once home and once away. The second phase was a play-off phase.

In the following season, 2002/03, the championship returned to the regulations of 2000/01 – 14 teams playing in a home and away format. For the first time in 6 years, CSKA Sofia became champions.

=== A Group ===
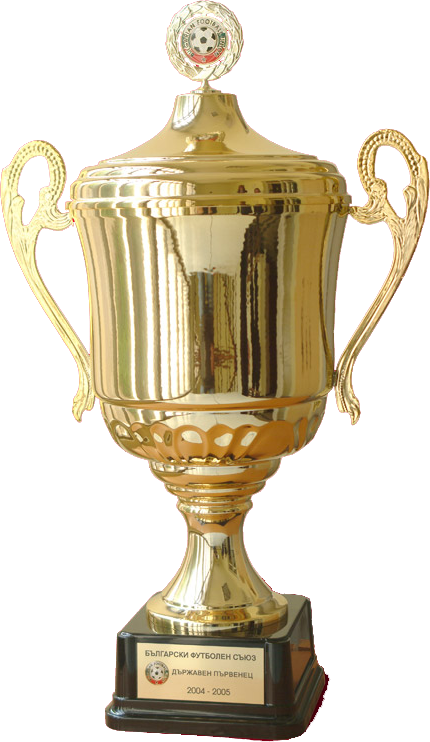
The A Group Trophy as of 2005

The Bulgarian A Professional Football Group was created in 2003. The group was formed by 16 teams, each playing twice against all the others, once home and once away. In the first season of the newly created A Group, the 2003–04 season, for the first time in history, Lokomotiv Plovdiv became champions, finishing with 75 points. In 2004–05, CSKA Sofia won A Group for the 30th time. For the next two seasons, Levski Sofia were champions under manager Stanimir Stoilov. From 2005–06 the league's name has been A Football Group. In 2007–08, CSKA became champions of A Group for a record-breaking 31st time without a loss out of 30 matches. But in the summer, UEFA didn't give a licence for the club to play in the UEFA Champions League qualifying rounds and Levski Sofia entered to play in the tournament instead of CSKA. In the following season Levski Sofia won their last A Group title, finishing one point ahead of CSKA. Later on, two consecutive seasons Litex Lovech won another two titles like in 1997–98 and 1998–99. In 2011–12, after winning promotion from B Group, Ludogorets Razgrad became the second team after Litex to win the A Group in their first season.

The Bulgarian Football Union made some changes in the format of A Group prior to season 2013–14 with the reduction of the number of the teams participating in the top league from 16 to 14 and the reintroduction of the two phase league with a regular season and a playoff/play out phase. For the 2014–15 season, the league was once more decreased, this time to 12 teams, keeping the two phase format. This season was memorable since two of the most popular and successful clubs, CSKA Sofia and Lokomotiv Sofia, were both excluded from the league, despite finishing in the top 5 places. Both teams had accumulated debts and did not have the financial resources to pay them, so the BFU decided to take away their professional licenses. This was the first time in the history of the A Group that CSKA was relegated. For the 2015–16 season, the BFU decided to further decrease the number of teams competing, this time to just 10, with a quadruple round robin format introduced, a format used in the Croatian First Football League and Albanian Kategoria Superiore.

=== First Professional Football League ===
On 7 June 2016 the league's name was changed to First Professional Football League, following approval of new licensing criteria for the clubs. The new league name also came with a new format change, the fourth such in the last four seasons. A total of 14 teams would compete, and the season would consist of two phases, a regular season phase, where each team plays each other team twice, followed by a playoff phase, where the top six teams from the regular season compete for the title as well as European competition spots, while the remaining eight teams would compete for avoiding relegation to the Second League. This format was used from 2016 up until 2021.

In 2021, the BFU decided to once more change the format of the league. This time, the league would still consist of a regular season stage where teams compete against each other twice, but then the league would split into three phases. The top six clubs would again compete for the title and European spots, while teams ranked 7-10 at the end of the regular season would play in the Europa Conference Group, with the 7th placed team competing against the 4th placed team from the Championship group for a UEFA Europa Conference League spot. The bottom four teams would compete to avoid relegation. This format lasted only one season, however, as the league was expanded to 16 teams for the 2022–23 season. The three phases were kept identical though, with the exception being that six teams would compete in the relegation group instead of four. For the 2024–25 season, the format was modified yet again. After the regular season concludes, the league would split into a top four group to determine the champion and European competition places, a second group for teams ranked fifth through eight to determine the team that would compete in the playoffs for UEFA Conference League (team that finished fourth in the top group would play against the fifth-placed team), as well as a bottom eight group consisting of teams competing to avoid relegation, with the last two teams being directly relegated, while the 14th and 15th placed teams would compete in a playoff against the third and fourth placed teams from the Second League.

== Competition format ==
Starting from the 2022–23 season, a new league format was approved by the Bulgarian Football Union, in an attempt to improve each participating club's competitiveness, match attendance and performance in the league. It involves 16 teams playing in two phases, a regular season and playoffs. The first phase includes each club competing against every other team twice in a double round-robin system, on a home-away basis at a total of 30 games per team and played in 30 fixtures. Eight matches are played in every fixture at a total of 240 games played during the first phase. In the second phase, the top four teams form a European qualifying table, while between the 5th and 8th places will battle European Conference League play-off and bottom six teams participate in a relegation group. The winner of the top group is declared as Champions of Bulgaria and is awarded with the title.

=== International qualification ===
The top four teams compete against each other on a home-away basis. Two matches are played in every fixture of the top four, with the results and points after the regular season also included. At the end of the stage, every team will have played a total of 36 games. The winner of the group is declared as Champions of Bulgaria and automatically secures participation in the UEFA Champions League second qualifying round. The team that ranks second is awarded with a place in the UEFA Europa League qualifying rounds. The third team in the final standings would participate in a play-off match against a representative team from the bottom eight. Depending on the winner of the Bulgarian Cup final, a possible fourth team from the first six may compete in a play-off match for an UEFA Europa League spot instead of the third ranked team.

Note: If the Bulgarian Cup winner has secured its qualification for the European tournaments for the next season through results from Parva Liga, then the place in the UEFA Europa League play-off is awarded to the fourth ranked team in the final standings.

=== Relegation ===
The teams in the bottom eight are split in two sub-groups of four teams, Group A and Group B, depending on their final position after the regular season standings. The teams that enter Group A are the 7th, 10th, 11th and the 14th, and the teams that participate in Group B are the 8th, 9th, 12th and the 13th. Every participant plays twice against the other three teams in their group on a home-away basis. The teams from the bottom eight also compete with the results from the regular season. After the group stages, every team will have played a total number of 32 games. Depending on their final position in Group A and Group B, two sections will be formed, one for a play-off spot in next season's European competitions and one to avoid relegation. The first two teams from each group continue in the semi-finals, and the last two teams of each group continue to the semi-finals for a relegation match. After this phase, one team is directly relegated to the Second League and the remaining two teams will compete in two relegation matches against the second and the third ranked clubs from the Second League.

=== Tiebreakers ===
In case of a tie on points between two or more clubs, tiebreakers are applied in the following order:

1. Number of wins;
2. Goal difference;
3. Goals for;
4. Goals against;
5. Fewest red cards;
6. Fewest yellow cards;
7. Draw

== List of champions ==
=== Performance by club ===
Bold indicates clubs which play in the 2026–27 First League.

Club	Titles	Winning seasons
**CSKA Sofia**	31	1948, 1951, 1952, 1954, 1955, 1956, 1957, 1958, 1958–59, 1959–60, 1960–61, 1961–62, 1965–66, 1968–69, 1970–71, 1971–72, 1972–73, 1974–75, 1975–76, 1979–80, 1980–81, 1981–82, 1982–83, 1986–87, 1988–89, 1989–90, 1991–92, 1996–97, 2002–03, 2004–05, 2007–08
**Levski Sofia**	27	1933, 1937, 1942, 1946, 1947, 1948–49, 1950, 1953, 1964–65, 1967–68, 1969–70, 1973–74, 1976–77, 1978–79, 1983–84, 1984–85, 1987–88, 1992–93, 1993–94, 1994–95, 1999–2000, 2000–01, 2001–02, 2005–06, 2006–07, 2008–09, 2025–26
**Ludogorets Razgrad**	14	2011–12, 2012–13, 2013–14, 2014–15, 2015–16, 2016–17, 2017–18, 2018–19, 2019–20, 2020–21, 2021–22, 2022–23, 2023–24, 2024–25
**Slavia Sofia**	7	1928, 1930, 1936, 1938–39, 1941, 1943, 1995–96
Litex Lovech	4	1997–98, 1998–99, 2009–10, 2010–11
**Lokomotiv Sofia**	3	1945, 1963–64, 1977–78
Vladislav	3	1925, 1926, 1934
**Botev Plovdiv**	2	1929, 1966–67
AS-23	1	1931
Beroe	1	1985–86
Etar	1	1990–91
**Lokomotiv Plovdiv**	1	2003–04
**Spartak Varna**	1	1932
Spartak Plovdiv	1	1962–63
Sportklub Sofia	1	1935
Ticha	1	1937–38
ZhSK Sofia	1	1939–40

Notes:

- CSKA Sofia titles include those won as Septemvri pri CDNV, CDNA, and CFKA Sredets.
- Levski Sofia titles include those won as Levski-Spartak and Vitosha, as well as the re-awarded 1984–85 title.
- Botev Plovdiv total does not include 1984–85 title originally awarded to Trakia.

== All-time ranking (since 1948) ==
The all-time Parva Liga table is an overall record of all match results, points and goals for each team that has participated in the league since its inception in 1948. It also shows every team's number of top three finishes, their best classification, debut season and current spell in Parva Liga, or the season they were last part of the championship.

The table is accurate as of the end of the 2025–26 season.

In order to put the teams on equal terms, 3 points are awarded for a win and 1 for a tie, although the regulation of the various championships was different. The points are calculated according to the results achieved on the field. Administrative withdrawal of points is not taken into account. Canceled matches, as well as playoffs for promotion/remaining or participation in European tournaments, are not taken into account and are not included in the assets of the clubs.

The table below does not reflect the tables provided by official sources, including the Bulgarian Football Union. In general, the table presented below considers clubs bearing similar names and from the same city to be the same entity, and not separate clubs, whereas the Bulgarian Football Union considers the foundation of a new club to be a separate entity and records are kept separately.

All-time Parva Liga table
#	Club	S	MP	W	D	L	GF	GA	GD	Pts.	1st	2nd	3rd	Deb.	Span	BR	Notes
1	CSKA Sofia	77	2255	1364	517	374	4509	1921	+2588	4609	30	28	8	1948–49	2016–17	1	
2	Levski Sofia	78	2288	1334	526	428	4329	2024	+2305	4528	22	28	12	1948–49	1948–49	1	^{[a]}
3	Slavia Sofia	77	2268	966	538	764	3296	2671	+625	3436	1	7	11	1948–49	1952	1	^{[b]}
4	Botev Plovdiv	71	2101	804	489	808	2982	2870	+112	2901	1	2	11	1951	2012–13	1	
5	Lokomotiv Sofia	64	1835	770	460	605	2644	2215	+429	2770	2	3	10	1948–49	2014–15	1	Dissolved in 2015.
6	Lokomotiv Plovdiv	65	1969	768	463	738	2637	2641	-4	2767	1	2	4	1949–50	2001–02	1	
7	Cherno More	62	1849	676	484	689	2212	2259	-47	2512	–	1	3	1948–49	2000–01	2	
8	Beroe	59	1796	614	418	764	2148	2538	-390	2260	1	1	2	1954	2025–26	1	
9	Spartak Varna	46	1310	406	299	605	1497	2004	-507	1517	–	–	2	1950	2024–25	3	
10	Botev Vratsa	36	1121	362	251	508	1321	1678	-357	1337	–	–	1	1964–65	2018–19	3	
11	Minyor Pernik	38	1055	330	248	477	1175	1594	-419	1238	–	–	–	1951	2012–13	4	
12	Spartak Pleven	35	994	314	245	435	1150	1511	-361	1187	–	–	1	1952	2001–02	3	
13	Lovech	21	608	354	123	131	1113	552	+561	1185	4	1	3	1994–95	2015–16	1	Dissolved in 2026.
14	Ludogorets 1945	15	505	332	107	66	1044	357	+687	1103	14	1	–	2011–12	2011–12	1	^{[d]}
15	Pirin Blagoevgrad	29	892	269	222	401	938	1216	-278	1029	–	–	–	1973–74	2023–24	5	
16	Chernomorets 1919	29	866	277	188	401	1057	1410	-353	1019	–	–	–	1948–49	2003–04	5	^{[c]}
17	Dunav Ruse	29	838	260	206	372	888	1270	-382	986	–	–	–	1951	2026–27	4	
18	Etar Veliko Tarnovo	24	726	264	161	301	951	1043	-92	953	1	–	2	1969–70	1997–98	1	Dissolved in 2003.
19	Marek 1915	29	838	251	177	410	920	1374	-454	930	–	–	1	1948–49	2014–15	3	
20	Sliven	25	750	246	164	340	906	1109	-203	902	–	–	–	1963–64	2010–11	6	
21	Akademik Sofia	18	505	163	136	206	589	676	-87	625	–	–	2	1950	2010–11	3	
22	Neftochimic Burgas	14	430	171	83	176	600	567	+33	596	–	1	–	1994–95	2016–17	2	
23	Spartak Plovdiv	17	441	158	121	162	562	581	-19	595	1	1	–	1953	1995–96	1	
24	Spartak Sofia	15	377	135	124	118	456	416	+40	529	–	2	–	1948–49	1967–68	2	Dissolved in 2007.
25	Dobrudzha 1919	15	451	134	89	228	476	734	-258	491	–	–	–	1962–63	2025–26	7	
26	Belasitsa Petrich	12	368	116	68	184	377	590	-213	416	–	–	–	1980–81	2008–09	6	
27	Lokomotiv GO	10	304	102	59	143	310	462	-152	365	–	–	–	1963–64	2016–17	8	
28	Arda 1924	7	237	89	74	74	290	270	+20	341	–	–	–	2019–20	2019–20	4	
29	Chernomorets Burgas	7	218	92	53	73	288	223	+65	329	–	–	–	2007-08	2013–14	4	Dissolved in 2019.
30	Velbazhd Kyustendil	7	201	98	27	76	299	269	+30	321	–	–	3	1954	2000–01	3	
31	CSKA 1948	6	207	85	63	59	281	219	+62	318	–	1	1	2020–21	2020–21	2	
32	Montana	11	347	74	82	191	312	543	-231	304	–	–	–	1994–95	2025–26	9	
33	Septemvri Sofia	8	257	70	50	137	281	445	-164	260	–	–	–	1959–60	2024–25	5	
34	Yantra Gabrovo	7	214	65	50	99	239	332	-93	245	–	–	–	1970–71	1993–94	8	
35	Volov Shumen	7	212	61	38	113	219	368	-149	221	–	–	–	1972–73	1999–00	4	^{[f]}
36	Lokomotiv 1929 Sofia	5	177	54	47	76	188	252	-64	209	-	-	-	2021-22	2021–22	9	
37	Pirin Bl. Blagoevgrad	6	178	53	41	84	189	254	-65	200	–	–	–	2003–04	2010–11	8	Merged to form Pirin in 2008.
38	Haskovo	7	212	52	31	129	210	400	-190	187	–	–	–	1978–79	2014–15	8	
39	Etar Veliko Tarnovo	5	169	44	44	81	163	254	-91	176	–	–	–	2020–21	2023–24	7	
40	Hebar	6	193	42	42	109	178	313	-135	168	–	–	–	1989–90	2024–25	9	
41	Akademik Svishtov	4	120	36	26	58	136	195	-59	134	–	–	–	1976–77	1986–87	11	
42	Vihren Sandanski	4	118	38	14	66	117	173	-56	128	–	–	–	2005–06	2008–09	9	
43	Sevlievo	5	150	28	36	86	126	271	-145	120	–	–	–	2003–04	2011–12	12	
44	Rodopa Smolyan	4	118	31	17	70	106	194	-88	110	–	–	–	2003–04	2006–07	10	^{[g]}
45	Maritsa 1921	4	120	28	25	67	129	225	-126	109	–	–	–	1967–68	1996–97	14	
46	Tundzha 1915	3	97	28	22	47	98	152	-57	106	–	–	–	1970–71	1972–73	13	
47	Zavod 12 Sofia	3	74	23	27	24	72	80	-8	96	–	–	–	1954	1956	4	Merged with Slavia in 1957.
48	Tsarsko Selo Sofia	3	95	23	25	47	82	127	-45	94	–	–	–	2019–20	2021–22	8	Dissolved in 2022.
49	Vereya	3	106	24	19	63	73	195	-122	91	–	–	–	2016–17	2018–19	6	
50	Krumovgrad	2	72	21	19	32	65	90	-25	82	–	–	–	2023–24	2024–25	6	
51	Metalurg Pernik	2	58	22	6	30	60	77	-17	72	–	–	–	1997–98	1998–99	10	
52	Lokomotiv Mezdra	2	60	17	13	30	69	89	-20	64	–	–	–	2008–09	2009–10	8	Dissolved in 2012.^{[h]}
53	Vitosha Bistritsa	3	101	15	18	68	67	173	-106	63	–	–	–	2017–18	2019–20	13	
54	VVS Sofia	2	54	13	21	20	60	63	-3	60	–	–	–	1953	1955	8	Merged into CDNA in 1956.
55	DSO Stroitel Sofia	2	50	13	18	19	47	53	-6	57	–	–	–	1950	1953	8	Dissolved in 1954.
56	Pirin Gotse Delchev	2	68	16	8	44	62	148	-86	56	–	–	–	2012–13	2013–14	11	
57	Cherveno Zname Sofia	2	40	13	13	14	46	50	-4	52	–	–	–	1950	1951	6	Merged with CSKA in 1962.
58	Kaliakra Kavarna	2	60	10	11	39	45	117	-72	41	–	–	–	2010–11	2011–12	12	
59	Septemvri Pleven	3	66	9	14	43	48	137	-89	41	–	–	–	1950	1954	8	Merged with Spartak in 1957.
60	Rilski Sportist	2	56	11	6	39	51	116	-65	39	–	–	–	2002–03	2006–07	14	
61	Olimpik Teteven	1	30	11	2	17	26	50	-24	35	–	–	–	1997–98	1997–98	14	
62	Akademik Varna	1	28	9	7	12	26	43	-17	34	–	–	–	1953	1953	10	Merged with Cherno More in 1969.
63	Rakovski Ruse	2	60	9	6	45	41	151	-110	33	–	–	–	1995–96	1996–97	13	
64	Dimitrovgrad	1	30	8	6	16	32	66	-34	30	–	–	–	1986–87	1986–87	16	
65	Himik Dimitrovgrad	1	30	7	6	17	36	60	-24	27	–	–	–	1962–63	1962–63	16	Merged to form Dimitrovgrad in 1967.
66	Rozova Dolina	1	30	7	5	18	30	53	-23	26	–	–	–	1982–83	1982–83	15	
67	Lyubimets	1	38	6	3	29	35	104	-69	21	–	–	–	2013–14	2013–14	14	
68	Nesebar	1	30	5	5	20	26	63	-37	20	–	–	–	2004–05	2004–05	15	
69	Slavia Plovdiv	1	18	4	8	6	16	21	-5	20	–	–	–	1948–49	1948–49	7	
70	Sportist Svoge	1	30	5	4	21	23	59	-36	19	–	–	–	2009–10	2009–10	15	
71	Pavlikeni	1	26	5	4	17	12	45	-33	19	–	–	–	1955	1955	14	
72	Etar 1924	1	30	4	4	22	20	75	-55	16	–	–	–	2012-13	2012–13	16	Dissolved in 2013.
73	Bdin 1923	1	18	2	4	12	13	35	-22	10	–	–	–	1948–49	1948–49	9	
74	Svetkavitsa 1922	1	30	1	5	24	8	71	-63	8	–	–	–	2011–12	2011–12	16	
75	Conegliano	1	30	0	1	29	8	131	-123	1	–	–	–	2006–07	2006–07	16	Dissolved in 2007.

Key

Competing in Parva Liga
Competing in Vtora Liga
Competing in the amateur leagues
Not competing (see notes)

a. Never relegated.
b. Never relegated (withdrawn from the 1950 season with a political decision due to league reogranisation.
c. Club dissolved in 2006, successor clubs Chernomorets Burgas and Chernomorets 1919 Burgas were founded in 2005 and 2015.
d. Holds record for most consecutive national league titles (14).
e. Club dissolved in 2003, successor clubs Etar 1924 and later Etar Veliko Tarnovo were founded in 2002 and 2013.
f. Club dissolved in 2014 and refounded in 2018. successor club FC Shumen 1929 was founded 2013 and dissolved in 2016.
g. Club only supports a youth academy.
h. Club dissolved in 2012, successor clubs FC Lokomotiv 1929 Mezdra and OFC Lokomotiv Mezdra were founded in 2011 and 2012.

== Bulgarian derbies ==
=== The Eternal Derby ===
The Eternal Derby of Bulgarian football is contested between the two most successful and most popular football clubs in Bulgaria, Levski Sofia and CSKA Sofia.

=== Plovdiv derby ===
The Plovdiv derby is contested between Botev Plovdiv and Lokomotiv Plovdiv.

=== Varna derby ===
The Varna derby is match between Cherno more Varna and Spartak Varna.

== Media coverage ==
For the start of the new 2012–13 season, the football clubs rejected requests from four TV stations due to the low payments being offered – Bulgarian National Television, Nova Television, TV7 and TV+. Finally after the first set of fixtures, the satellite broadcaster Bulsatcom with its channel TV+ bought the rights, along with BNT. Before the start of the spring half-season the rights were bought by TV7 and News7, who had rights for the first, third and fourth pick, and BNT 1 along with the international channel BNT World broadcasting the second pick of a match.

The next seasons will also be broadcast on the Nova Broadcasting Group channels Diema, Diema Sport and Diema Sport 2, part of the Diema Extra paid pack, as their contract with the league was additionally extended.

== Sponsorship ==
Until 2011 the official sponsor of the championship was TBI Credit and the league was officially known as TBI A Football Group.

In 2011–12, A Group had a new sponsor, the Victoria FATA Insurance, and therefore the league name in that season was rebranded to Victoria A Football Championship.

In early 2013, for a short period of time the naming rights of A Group were bought from the news television network News7, eventually renaming the competition's name to NEWS7 Football Championship.

On 11 July 2019, the Bulgarian Football Union announced that the football division's name had been changed to efbet League, following a two-year sponsorship deal with a betting company of the same name.

== Statistics ==
=== UEFA coefficients ===
The following data indicates Bulgarian coefficient rankings between European football leagues.

Country ranking

UEFA League Ranking as of the end of 2022-23 season:

- 25. (27) (Hungary) Nemzeti Bajnokság I (20.625)
- 26. (25) (Romania) Liga I (20.500)
- 27. (24) (Bulgaria) First Professional Football League (20.000)
- 28. (30) (Slovakia) Slovak Super Liga (19.750)
- 29. (26) Azerbaijan Premier League (16.625)

Club ranking

UEFA 5-year Club Ranking as of 29 May 2021:

- 78. (70) Ludogorets Razgrad (21.000)
- 114. (129) CSKA Sofia (13.000)
- 242. (287) Lokomotiv Plovdiv (5.500)
- 278. (292) Levski Sofia (4.500)
- 316. (292) Slavia Sofia (4.000)
- 316. (292) Botev Plovdiv (4.000)

== Managers ==
The following is a table of all current Parva Liga head coaches and managers, and the time they've spent working with their respective clubs.

As of 13 November 2026

Current managers
Nat.	Manager	Club	Appointed	Time as manager
(Bulgaria)	Ilian Iliev	Cherno More	28 December 2017	8 years, 320 days
(Bulgaria)	Aleksandar Tunchev	Arda	7 June 2024	2 years, 159 days
(Slovenia)	Dušan Kosič	Lokomotiv Plovdiv	19 December 2024	1 year, 329 days
(Spain)	Julio Velázquez	Levski Sofia	6 January 2025	1 year, 311 days
(Bulgaria)	Todor Simov	Botev Vratsa	24 September 2025	1 year, 50 days
(Serbia)	Ratko Dostanić	Slavia Sofia	11 October 2025	1 year, 33 days
(Bulgaria)	Stanislav Genchev	Botev Plovdiv	27 May 2026	170 days
(Bulgaria)	Ognyan Mladenov	CSKA 1948	9 September 2026	65 days
(Bulgaria)	Georgi Chilikov	Dunav	16 September 2026	58 days
(Croatia)	Igor Jovićević	Ludogorets	23 September 2026	51 days
(Germany)	Markus Gisdol	CSKA Sofia	29 September 2026	45 days
(Montenegro)	Mladen Kašćelan	Septemvri Sofia	24 October 2026	20 days
(Brazil)	Daniel Morales	Spartak Varna	3 November 2026	10 days
(Bulgaria)	Aleksandar Georgiev (interim)	Lokomotiv Sofia	5 November 2026	8 days

== Records ==
=== All-time league appearances ===
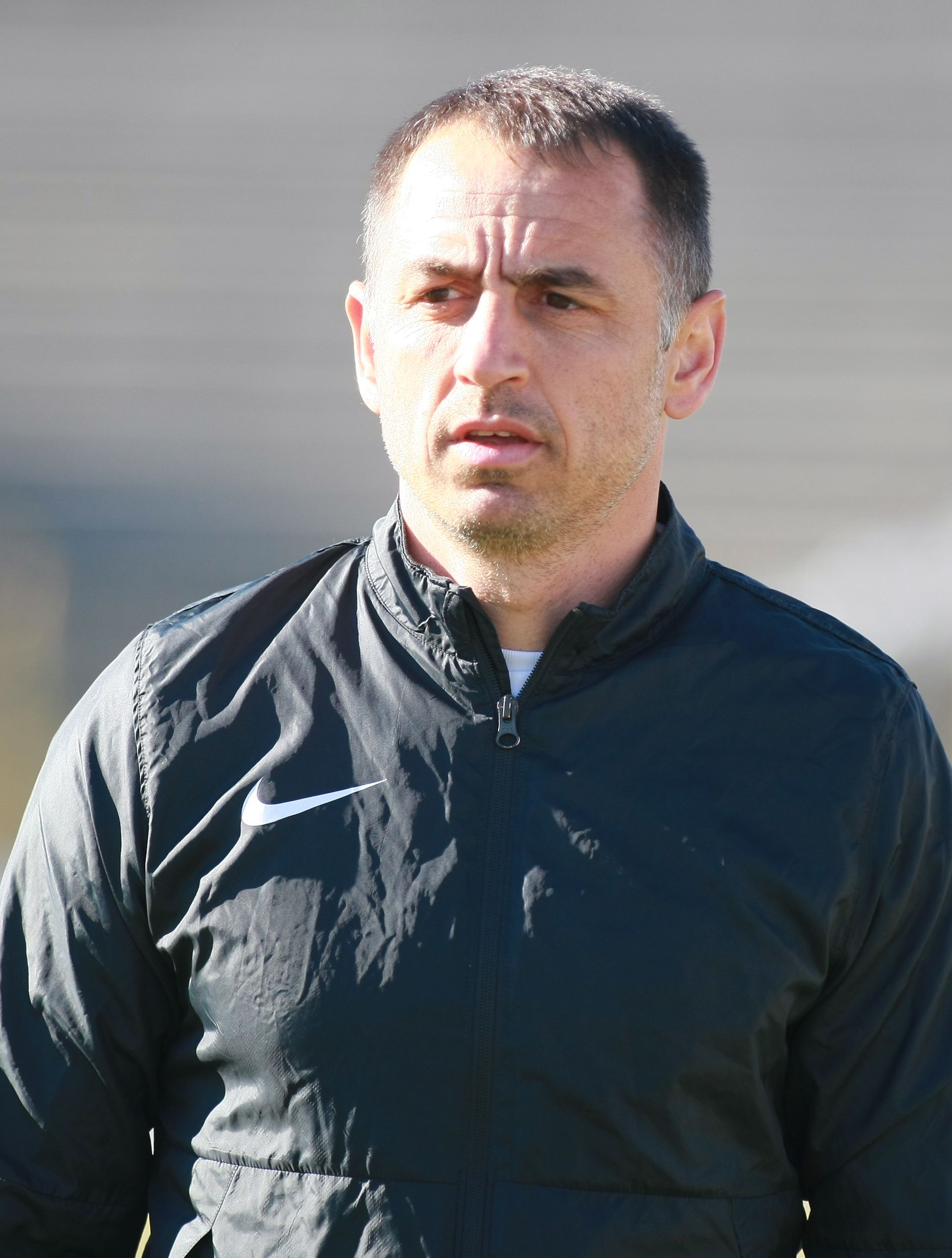
Georgi Iliev holds the records for most appearances in First League

Top 10 appearances in Bulgarian First League
Rank	Player	Period	App.
1	(Bulgaria) Georgi Iliev	2000–2019	461
2	(Bulgaria) Martin Kamburov	1998–2021	456
3	(Bulgaria) Marin Bakalov	1980–1999	454
4	(Bulgaria) Dinko Dermendzhiev	1959–1978	447
5	(Bulgaria) **Galin Ivanov**	2006–present	445
6	(Bulgaria) Vidin Apostolov	1959–1976	444
7	(Bulgaria) Todor Marev	1972–1994	422
8	(Bulgaria) **Dimitar Iliev**	2004–present	421
9	(Bulgaria) Hristo Bonev	1964–1984	410
10	(Bulgaria) Zapryan Rakov	1983–1999	403
**Bold** displays footballers currently playing in First League; As of 15 June 2026

=== All-time top scorers ===
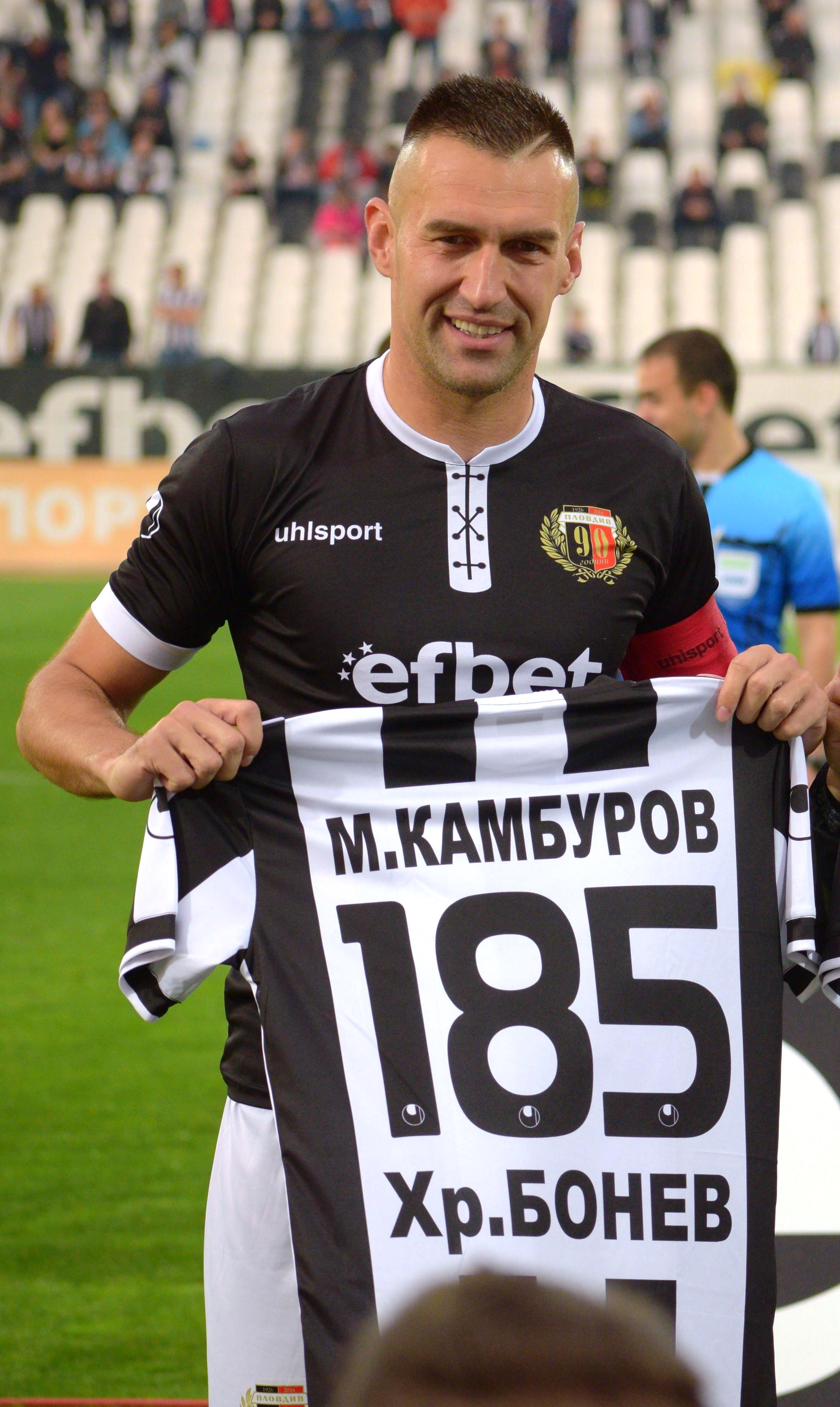
Martin Kamburov is the all-time top goalscorer in First League with 256 goals

Top 10 goalscorers in Bulgarian First League
Rank	Player	Period	Goals	Average
1	(Bulgaria) Martin Kamburov	1998–2021	256	0.56
2	(Bulgaria) Petar Zhekov	1962–1975	253	0.76
3	(Bulgaria) Nasko Sirakov	1980–1998	196	0.59
4	(Bulgaria) Dinko Dermendzhiev	1959–1978	194	0.43
5	(Bulgaria) Hristo Bonev	1964–1984	185	0.45
6	(Bulgaria) Plamen Getov	1977–1998	164	0.57
7	(Bulgaria) Nikola Kotkov	1956–1971	163	0.51
8	(Bulgaria) Stefan Bogomilov	1962–1976	162	0.46
9	(Bulgaria) Petar Mihtarski	1982–2001	158	0.48
10	(Bulgaria) Petko Petkov	1968–1980	152	0.53
**Bold** displays footballers currently playing in First League; As of 15 June 2026

=== Other records ===
As of 22 September 2025

- Youngest player to appear in the league – (Bulgaria) Radoslav Uzunov (aged 15 years and 1 month)
- Oldest player to appear in the league – (Bulgaria) Georgi Petkov (aged 49 years, 1 month and 27 days)
- Foreign player with the most appearances in the league – (North Macedonia) Vančo Trajanov (328)
- Foreign player with the most goals in the league – (Romania) Claudiu Keșerü (119)
- Footballer with the most titles won - (Bulgaria) Manol Manolov (12, all with CSKA Sofia)
- Footballer who has won the title with the most teams - (Bulgaria) Stefan Kolev (5 titles - 1 with Levski Sofia, 1 with CSKA Sofia, 1 with Slavia Sofia and 2 with Litex Lovech)
- Manager with the most titles won - (Bulgaria) Krum Milev (11, all with CSKA Sofia)
- Manager with the most matches in charge of a team - (Bulgaria) Dimitar Dimitrov and (Bulgaria) Ilian Iliev (491)
- Most goals scored in a single match - (Bulgaria) Ivo Georgiev, (Bulgaria) Petar Mihaylov, (Bulgaria) Todor Pramatarov, and (Bulgaria) Tsvetan Genkov (6)
- Fastest goal scored in the league – (Bulgaria) Miroslav Manolov (6 seconds)
- Goal scored at latest point in a match (excluding extra time) – (Bulgaria) Spas Delev (108th minute)
- Fastest red card in the league – (Serbia) Nenad Filipović (20 seconds)
- Tallest player to appear in the league – (Italy) Alessandro Coppola (2.05 m)

=== Top scorers by season ===
Bold indicates all-time highest.

Season	Player (Club)	Nat.	Goals
1937–38	Krum Milev (Slavia Sofia)	BUL	12
1938–39	Georgi Pachedzhiev (AS 23 Sofia)	BUL	14
1939–40	Yanko Stoyanov (Levski Sofia); Dimitar Nikolaev (FC 13 Sofia)	BUL; BUL	14
1948–49	Dimitar Milanov (CSKA Sofia); Nedko Nedev (Cherno More Varna)	BUL; BUL	11
1950	Lyubomir Hranov (Levski Sofia)	BUL	13
1951	Dimitar Milanov (2) (CSKA Sofia)	BUL	14
1952	Dimitar Isakov (Slavia Sofia); Dobromir Tashkov (Spartak Sofia)	BUL; BUL	10
1953	Dimitar Minchev (Spartak Pleven and VVS Sofia)	BUL	15
1954	Dobromir Tashkov (2) (Slavia Sofia)	BUL	25
1955	Todor Diev (Spartak Plovdiv)	BUL	13
1956	Pavel Vladimirov (Minyor Pernik)	BUL	16
1957	Hristo Iliev (Levski Sofia); Dimitar Milanov (3) (CSKA Sofia)	BUL; BUL	14
1958	Dobromir Tashkov (3) (Slavia Sofia); Georgi Arnaudov (Spartak Varna)	BUL; BUL	9
1958–59	Aleksandar Vasilev (Slavia Sofia)	BUL	13
1959–60	Dimitar Yordanov (Levski Sofia); Lyuben Kostov (Spartak Varna)	BUL; BUL	12
1960–61	Ivan Sotirov (Botev Plovdiv)	BUL	20
1961–62	Nikola Yordanov (Dunav Ruse)	BUL	23
1962–63	Todor Diev (2) (Spartak Plovdiv)	BUL	26
1963–64	Nikola Tsanev (CSKA Sofia)	BUL	26
1964–65	Georgi Asparuhov (Levski Sofia)	BUL	27
1965–66	Traycho Spasov (Marek Dupnitsa)	BUL	21
1966–67	Petar Zhekov (Beroe Stara Zagora)	BUL	21
1967–68	Petar Zhekov (2) (Beroe Stara Zagora)	BUL	31
1968–69	Petar Zhekov (3) (CSKA Sofia)	BUL	36
1969–70	Petar Zhekov (4) (CSKA Sofia)	BUL	31
1970–71	Dimitar Yakimov (CSKA Sofia)	BUL	26
1971–72	Petar Zhekov (5) (CSKA Sofia)	BUL	27
1972–73	Petar Zhekov (6) (CSKA Sofia)	BUL	29
1973–74	Petko Petkov (Beroe Stara Zagora)	BUL	20
1974–75	Ivan Pritargov (Botev Plovdiv)	BUL	20
1975–76	Petko Petkov (2) (Beroe Stara Zagora)	BUL	19
1976–77	Pavel Panov (Levski Sofia)	BUL	20
1977–78	Stoycho Mladenov (Beroe Stara Zagora)	BUL	21
1978–79	Rusi Gochev (Chernomorets Burgas and Levski Sofia)	BUL	19
1979–80	Spas Dzhevizov (CSKA Sofia)	BUL	23
1980–81	Georgi Slavkov (Botev Plovdiv)	BUL	31
1981–82	Mihail Valchev (Levski Sofia)	BUL	24
1982–83	Antim Pehlivanov (Botev Plovdiv)	BUL	20
1983–84	Eduard Eranosyan (Lokomotiv Plovdiv)	BUL	19
1984–85	Plamen Getov (Spartak Pleven)	BUL	26
1985–86	Atanas Pashev (Botev Plovdiv)	BUL	30
1986–87	Nasko Sirakov (Levski Sofia)	BUL	36
1987–88	Nasko Sirakov (2) (Levski Sofia)	BUL	28
1988–89	Hristo Stoichkov (CSKA Sofia)	BUL	23
1989–90	**Hristo Stoichkov** (2) (CSKA Sofia)	BUL	**38**
1990–91	Ivaylo Yordanov (Lokomotiv Gorna Oryahovitsa)	BUL	21
1991–92	Nasko Sirakov (3) (Levski Sofia)	BUL	26
1992–93	Plamen Getov (2) (Levski Sofia)	BUL	26
1993–94	Nasko Sirakov (4) (Levski Sofia)	BUL	30
1994–95	Petar Mihtarski (CSKA Sofia)	BUL	24
1995–96	Ivo Georgiev (Spartak Varna)	BUL	21
1996–97	Todor Pramatarov (Slavia Sofia)	BUL	26
1997–98	Anton Spasov (Naftex Burgas); Boncho Genchev (CSKA Sofia)	BUL; BUL	17
1998–99	Dimcho Belyakov (Litex Lovech)	BUL	21
1999–00	Mihail Mihaylov (Velbazhd Kyustendil)	BUL	20
2000–01	Georgi Ivanov (Levski Sofia)	BUL	22
2001–02	Vladimir Manchev (CSKA Sofia)	BUL	21
2002–03	Georgi Chilikov (Levski Sofia)	BUL	23
2003–04	Martin Kamburov (Lokomotiv Plovdiv)	BUL	25
2004–05	Martin Kamburov (2) (Lokomotiv Plovdiv)	BUL	27
2005–06	Milivoje Novaković (Litex Lovech); José Emílio Furtado (Vihren and CSKA Sofia)	SVN; CPV	16
2006–07	Tsvetan Genkov (Lokomotiv Sofia)	BUL	27
2007–08	Georgi Hristov (Botev Plovdiv)	BUL	19
2008–09	Martin Kamburov (3) (Lokomotiv Sofia)	BUL	17
2009–10	Wilfried Niflore (Litex Lovech)	FRA	19
2010–11	Garra Dembélé (Levski Sofia)	MLI	26
2011–12	Ivan Stoyanov (Ludogorets Razgrad); Júnior Moraes (CSKA Sofia)	BUL; BRA	16
2012–13	Basile de Carvalho (Levski Sofia)	GNB	19
2013–14	Wilmar Jordán (Litex Lovech); Martin Kamburov (4) (Lokomotiv Plovdiv)	COL; BUL	20
2014–15	Añete (Levski Sofia)	ESP	14
2015–16	Martin Kamburov (5) (Lokomotiv Plovdiv)	BUL	18
2016–17	Claudiu Keșerü (Ludogorets Razgrad)	ROM	22
2017–18	Claudiu Keșerü (2) (Ludogorets Razgrad)	ROM	26
2018–19	Stanislav Kostov (Levski Sofia)	BUL	23
2019–20	Martin Kamburov (6) (Beroe)	BUL	18
2020–21	Claudiu Keșerü (3) (Ludogorets Razgrad)	ROM	18
2021–22	Pieros Sotiriou (Ludogorets Razgrad)	CYP	17
2022–23	Ivaylo Chochev (CSKA 1948 Sofia)	BUL	21
2023–24	Aleksandar Kolev (Krumovgrad)	BUL	15
2024–25	Santiago Godoy (Beroe)	ARG	18

== See also ==
- List of foreign football players in A PFG
- Second Professional Football League (Bulgaria)
