= Ivan Mokanov =

Bulgarian footballer (1912–1982)

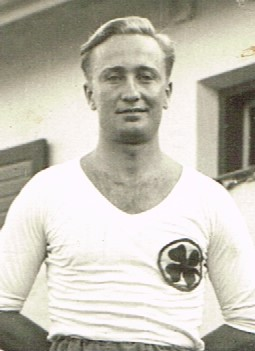
- Mokanov in 1934

Personal information
- Full name: Ivan Georgiev Mokanov
- Date of birth: 20 February 1912
- Place of birth: Varna, Bulgaria
- Date of death: 13 April 1982 (aged 70)
- Place of death: Varna, Bulgaria
- Position: Defender

Senior career*
Years	Team	Apps	(Gls)
1929–1944	Vladislav		
1945	Ticha-Vladislav		
Total		210	(14)

International career
1933–1940	Bulgaria	4	(0)

Managerial career
- 1948–1960: Cherno More
- 1964–1968: Cherno More
- 1979–1980: Cherno More
- * Club domestic league appearances and goals

Ivan Mokanov (Bulgarian: Иван Моканов; 20 March 1912 – 16 April 1982) was a Bulgarian football player and manager.

Ivan Mokanov played 210 matches and scored 14 goals in his career with SC Vladislav and its successor Ticha-Vladislav (1928–1945) in the Varna regional league and the Bulgarian State Competition. He was a Bulgarian champion and cup winner in 1934 and runner-up in 1928, 1930, 1938, 1939. He was capped four times for the National team. Mokanov stayed on in the Varna team as manager until 1960 and for the period 1964–68 when it was already known under its current name Cherno More. He graduated from the National Coaching Academy in 1948 and was awarded an Honours Coaching degree in 1963. With his 52 years of service to Cherno More, Ivan Mokanov is synonymous with club loyalty.

== Club career ==
Ivan Mokanov began his career in the youth team of Vladislav in 1928 and two years later he established himself as a permanent A team defender. In the 2-4-4 system, which was popular at the time, Mokanov was a key pillar of the defense. He was known by the force of his shot, which was very much appreciated at the time, when long ball tactics were widely used. This is why Mokanov also became the regular penalty taker. He was known to have missed only once from the penalty spot. After the championship-winning final of 16 September 1934, Mokanov was rated best player of the match against Slavia Sofia by the "Sport" newspaper . He was Vladislav's captain and playing coach in the pre-war years from 1937 to 1944, and during the transformation of the team to Ticha-Vladislav after the war.

== International career ==
Ivan Mokanov made his debut for the National team on 21 May 1933 in Madrid against Spain and made his last appearance for the team on 6 June 1940 in Sofia against Slovakia.

== Coaching career ==
As senior team coach, Mokanov was known for his talent-spotting ability. He developed players like Nedko Nedev, Ivan Derventski, Spas Kirov, Stefan Bogomilov, Bozhil Kolev, Stefan Yanev, Damyan Georgiev. Some of them reached the National team formations and some made careers in Sofia teams which was considered a great achievement at the time. He coached the 1953 team to a Group A third-place finish. With his 4 years as player-coach of SC Vladislav and 17 years as head coach of Cherno More, Ivan Mokanov still is the longest serving coach of any Bulgarian football club. Under his leadership, Cherno More achieved prestigious wins against Ajax Amsterdam on 8 June 1966 in Varna (3–1), and on tour in England the same summer, the team from Varna defeated soon to be First Division runners-up Nottingham Forest (1–0). Although advancing in age, Ivan Mokanov returned for one final season (1979–80) to lead the team which was then in crisis. For his contribution to the club, plans are being made to erect a bronze statue of him in the Ticha club stadium by grateful fans of FC Cherno More.
