= 1955 PFC Cherno More Varna season =

Cherno More Varna
1955 season
- Manager: Ivan Mokanov
- Republican Football Group A: 12th

The 1955 season was Cherno More's fourth successive season in the Republican Football Group A. The club competed as VMS Stalin after Varna was renamed after the Soviet dictator in December 1949.

== Overview ==
The season started with five successive wins against the traditionally strong Sofia teams but ended in relegation on goal difference. After the flying start, there was great enthusiasm among players in the club and talk of becoming champions. According to Vasil Dossev, who scored the winning goal against Dinamo in Sofia, he insisted the team focus on gaining enough points to avoid relegation. He was removed from his position as captain for his statements and defeatist attitude.

With relegation looming in October, Cherno More recorded the club's joint-record win in the top flight by thrashing Cherveno Zname Pavlikeni 8-0 in the penultimate game of the season. This was followed by an away win against Spartak in Plovdiv, allowing the team to move four points clear of Zavod 12, who had two games in hand. Zavod 12 defeated Lokomotiv Plovdiv 2-0 and Spartak Plovdiv 2-1 in matches played long after Cherno More's season had ended. Both teams gained 25 points, with Zavod 12's goal difference 26-27 and Cherno More's 26-28, resulting in the relegation of Cherno More Varna from the league.

== Republican Football Group A ==
=== Matches ===
6 March 1955 Round 1	VMS Stalin	1–0	CDNA Sofia	Varna

12 March 1955 Round 2	VMS Stalin	2–0	Lokomotiv Sofia	Varna

20 March 1955 Round 3	VMS Stalin	2–1	Zavod 12 Sofia	Varna

26 March 1955 Round 4	Dinamo Sofia	1–2	VMS Stalin	Sofia

3 April 1955 Round 5	VMS Stalin	1–0	Udarnik Sofia	Varna

17 April 1955 Round 6	VVS Sofia	3–0	VMS Stalin	Sofia

24 April 1955 Round 11	VMS Stalin	0–2	Minyor Dimitrovo	Varna

2 May 1955 Round 7	VMS Stalin	0–1	DNA Plovdiv	Varna

8 May 1955 Round 8	Spartak Stalin	0–0	VMS Stalin	Varna

15 May 1955 Round 9	VMS Stalin	1–0	Lokomotiv Plovdiv	Varna

28 May 1955 Round 10	Spartak Pleven	1–0	VMS Stalin	Pleven

5 June 1955 Round 12	Cherveno Zname Pavlikeni	0–0	VMS Stalin	Pavlikeni

19 June 1955 Round 13	VMS Stalin	0–1	Spartak Plovdiv	Varna

3 July 1955 Round 14	CDNA Sofia	3–0	VMS Stalin	Sofia

9 July 1955 Round 15	Lokomotiv Sofia	0–0	VMS Stalin	Sofia

11 August 1955 Round 16	Zavod 12 Sofia	0–1	VMS Stalin	Sofia

23 August 1955 Round 17	VMS Stalin	0–1	Dinamo Sofia	Varna

31 August 1955 Round 18	Udarnik Sofia	3–1	VMS Stalin	Sofia

4 September 1955 Round 19	VMS Stalin	1–1	VVS Sofia	Varna

9 September 1955 Round 24	Minyor Dimitrovo	4–1	VMS Stalin	Pernik

13 September 1955 Round 21	VMS Stalin	2–1	Spartak Stalin	Varna

25 September 1955 Round 23	VMS Stalin	1–1	Spartak Pleven	Varna

9 October 1955 Round 20	DNA Plovdiv	2–0	VMS Stalin	Plovdiv

13 October 1955 Round 22	Lokomotiv Plovdiv	2–1	VMS Stalin	Plovdiv

20 October 1955 Round 25	VMS Stalin	8–0	Cherveno Zname Pavlikeni	Varna

25 October 1955 Round 26	Spartak Plovdiv	0–1	VMS Stalin	Plovdiv

- Varna was renamed Stalin after Soviet dictator Joseph Stalin from 20 December 1949 to 20 October 1956;
- Pernik was renamed Dimitrovo after Bulgarian Communist leader Georgi Dimitrov from 1949 to 1962;
- CDNA Sofia is a former name of CSKA Sofia;
- Dinamo Sofia is a former name of Levski Sofia;
- Udarnik Sofia is a former name of Slavia Sofia;
- DNA Plovdiv is a former name of Botev Plovdiv.

=== League standings ===
Pos	Team	Pld	W	D	L	GF	GA	GD	Pts	Qualification or relegation
10	Botev Plovdiv	26	9	8	9	27	31	−4	26	
11	Zavod 12 Sofia	26	9	7	10	26	27	−1	25	
12	Cherno More Varna (R)	26	10	5	11	26	28	−2	25	Relegation to 1956 B Group
13	Lokomotiv Plovdiv (R)	26	6	6	14	18	29	−11	18	Relegation to 1956 B Group
14	Pavlikeni (R)	26	5	4	17	12	45	−33	14	Relegation to 1956 B Group

Source: rsssf.com
(R) Relegated

=== Results summary ===
Overall								Home						Away					
Pld	W	D	L	GF	GA	GD	Pts	W	D	L	GF	GA	GD	W	D	L	GF	GA	GD
26	10	5	11	26	28	−2	35	7	2	4	19	9	+10	3	3	7	7	19	−12

== Soviet Army Cup ==
Round of 32	VMS Stalin	2–1	Spartak Stalin

Round of 16	DNA Plovdiv	1–0	VMS Stalin
