= FC Dunav Lom =

Bulgarian football club

Dunav Lom
- Full name: Football Club Dunav Lom
- Founded: 20 June 1921; 105 years ago as SC Levski
- Ground: Dunavski Yunak
- Capacity: 2,500
- Chairman: Vacant
- Manager: Vacant
- League: North-West Third League
- 2022–23: A Regional - Montana, 1st (promoted)
Home colours	Away colours

FC Dunav Lom (Bulgarian: ФК Дунав Лом) is a Bulgarian football club based in Lom, who compete in the North-West Third League, the third division of Bulgarian football league system.

The club was founded in 1921. They play their home games at the 2,500-capacity Gradski Stadium. Their highest finishing position were in 1928 and 1934, ending in 1st place in Bulgarian State Football Championship under the name SC Maria Luisa. In 1939 they got to the finals of Bulgarian Cup.

== History ==
=== Foundation ===
The football history in Lom was started from the famous Swiss-Bulgarian teacher Louis-Emil Eyer, who started a football academy in the Nayden Gerov High School in 1894. In 1903 students from the school started the first football club in town - SC Nayden Gerov.

June 20, 1921 was the official establishment of SC Levski. In 1925, the team merged with SC Slaveykov Lom adopting the name SC Maria Luisa. As a result, Levski marked their highest finishing position was in 1928 and 1934, ending in 5th place in Bulgarian State Football Championship.

=== 1945 - 1993 ===
After the World War II all sports clubs in Lom were formed into one named again Levski. In 1948 and 1949 in Lom were founded FC Botev, FC Dunav, FC Torpedo, FC DNA, FC Stroitel, FC Dinamo, DSO Lokomotiv, DSO Cherveno zname and several others. In 1954 DSO Lokomotiv was promoted to B Group. In the next year, it was merged with Cherveno Zname to form FD Levski. In 1956 Levski won B Group, but in the next season relegated to V Group.

In 1967, the team won its promotion to B Group once again. In 1969, the team adopted the name FD Dunav. After 6 conservative seasons in the second level of Bulgarian football, the team relegated to V Group. In 1975, the team won their promotion back to Second League, but was once again relegated to Third league in 1976. In 1978, team relegated to the Regional League where it spent most of the time between late 70s and 80s.

In 1990, the team once again adopted the name Levski. In 1993, it was promoted to B Group, but the team was dissolved in the half of the season, despite its 4th position.

=== 2003 - 2017 ===
In 2003, the team was resurrected under the name SC Maria Luisa. In 2004, it was promoted to V Group and stayed in the league until 2009, when the team retired. A year later, the team joined the Amateur League, but was once again dissolved after just a season.

In 2012, Levski 2012 Lom was registered and joined B Regional League, with most of the players coming from the dissolved in the same year team FC Almus Beer Staliyska Mahala based in Lom. For the next season, the team was promoted to the A Regional League. Due to financial problems, the club left the league once again before end of the season. In 2015, the team joined B Regional League under the name Almus 2012 Lom, but was dissolved in 2017, after the team finished on 11th place in A Regional League.

=== 2020 - present ===
In July 2020, after the assistance of the mayor of Lom, Georgi Gavrailov, the administratively promoted to Third League team FC Rasovo, merged with Polomie 2012 Lom to form 'FC Levski 2020 Lom that joined the 2020–21 Third League season. Gavrailov also helped the team with renovating the football stadium and base. Ex Levski Sofia player Blagoy Krastanov was announced as manager. Despite finishing unbeaten in the first half of the season and as a leader of the group, on 17 March 2021 Ferario Spasov was announced as the new manager of the team. On 30 May 2021 Levski (Lom) clarified that the separation from the experienced specialist Ferario Spasov was by mutual consent.

On 16 May 2021, Levski guaranteed their first place in North-West Third League and got promoted to Second League. At the half season, the team withdraw from the league.

In the summer of 2022 the team returned to A Regional - Montana and once again changed club name, to return to Dunav. They won promotion and joined North-West Third League for the 2023–24 season.

== Honours ==
Bulgarian State Football Championship:

- 5th place (2): 1928, 1934

Second League:

- Winners (1): 1956

V Group/Third League:

- Winners (3): 1965–66, 1966–67, 1974–75, 2020–21

Bulgarian Cup:

- Quarterfinals (1): 1939

== Players ==
=== First-team squad ===
As of 3 March 2021

Note: Flags indicate national team as defined under FIFA eligibility rules; some limited exceptions apply. Players may hold more than one non-FIFA nationality.

No. / Pos. / Nation / Player	No. / Pos. / Nation / Player

=== Out on loan ===
Note: Flags indicate national team as defined under FIFA eligibility rules; some limited exceptions apply. Players may hold more than one non-FIFA nationality.

No.	Pos.	Nation	Player

=== Foreign players ===
Up to five non-EU nationals can be registered and given a squad number for the first team in the Bulgarian First League; however, only three can be used in a match day. Those non-EU nationals with European ancestry can claim citizenship from the nation their ancestors came from. If a player does not have European ancestry he can claim Bulgarian citizenship after playing in Bulgaria for 5 years.

EU Nationals EU Nationals (Dual citizenship)

Non-EU Nationals

== Notable players ==
The footballers enlisted below have international caps for their respective countries or more than 100 caps for Levski. Players whose name is listed in bold represented their countries.

Bulgaria

- (Bulgaria) **Yordan Yordanov**
- (Bulgaria) **Lyudmil Goranov**
- (Bulgaria) **Genadi Simeonov**
- (Bulgaria) **Stefan Yurukov**
- (Bulgaria) **Aleksandar Yanakiev**
- (Bulgaria) **Ivo Zhelezarov**
- (Bulgaria) **Mariyan Ognyanov**

== Club officials ==
=== Coaching staff and personnel ===
Vacant	President
Vacant	Manager
Vacant	Head coach
Vacant	Youth academy director

=== Manager history ===
Name	Nat	From	To	Honours
Blagoy Krastanov	(Bulgaria)	1 August 2020	17 March 2021	
Ferario Spasov	(Bulgaria)	17 March 2021	30 May 2021	1 Third League title
Emil Velev	(Bulgaria)	31 May 2021	11 August 2021	
Ivaylo Vasilev	(Bulgaria)	12 August 2021	1 November 2021	

== Past seasons ==
Season	League	Place	W	D	L	GF	GA	Pts	Bulgarian Cup
2020–21	Third League	1st	28	6	0	86	11	90	DNE
2021–22	Second League	—	—	—	—	—	—	—	qualified
**Green marks a season followed by promotion, red a season followed by relegation.**
