= Svetlen =

Svetlen may refer to the following villages in Bulgaria:

- Svetlen, Kardzhali Province
- Svetlen, Targovishte Province
