= Egon Terzetta =

Italian footballer (1899–1964)

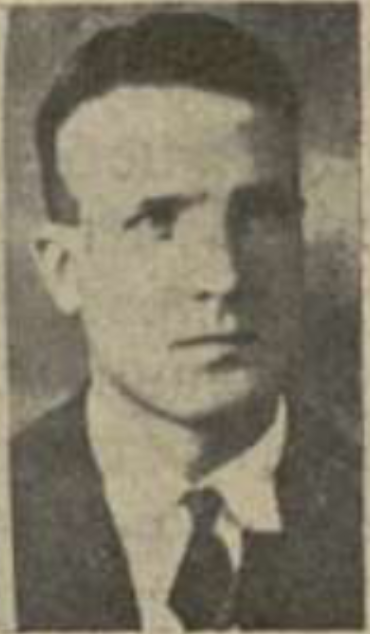

Personal information
- Date of birth: 2 July 1899
- Place of birth: Valona, Ottoman Empire
- Date of death: 16 August 1964 (aged 65)
- Place of death: Genoa, Italy

Senior career*
Years	Team	Apps	(Gls)
1920	Ticha		
1921–1928	Vladislav		
- * Club domestic league appearances and goals

Egon Terzetta (Bulgarian: Егон Терцета) (2 July 1899 – 16 August 1964) was an Italian footballer who played for SK Ticha and SC Vladislav from Varna, Bulgaria.

Terzetta was born in Valona, Ottoman Empire, modern-day Albania, into a family of old Venetian descent. At age 9, Egon was sent to the Military Academy of Vienna (Militar Oberrealschule – Marburg), where he graduated at 18. He followed in his father's footsteps, becoming a shipping agent. Due to his work he traveled to many Mediterranean and Black Sea ports.

Terzetta finally settled in the Black Sea port city of Varna, Bulgaria. Here he demonstrated his football talent, initially playing for SK Ticha. After a rift within membership, Terzetta joined Boris Stavrev, Andrej Ivanov, and Petar Hristov on a new team, Sport Club Vladislav, which formed from the splitting of Sport Club Granit. With Vladislav, Terzetta won the first ever Tsar's Cup in 1925, captaining the team to its first Championship title. He also scored the second goal in a 2–0 victory in the final match against Levski Sofia. Terzetta was the team's captain also in its second successive Championship winning final in 1926. His career came to an abrupt end after he suffered an injury few days before the final match in 1928. Egon Terzetta married Russian white émigré Tamara Pelehin. The couple had a daughter Alicia, born in 1930. After the communist take over in Bulgaria, the family moved to Italy and settled in Genoa where Egon resumed his career as a shipping agent. He died peacefully in Genoa his sleep on 16 August 1964 and is buried in the Monumental Cemetery of Staglieno.
