= 1943 Bulgarian State Football Championship =

Bulgarian State Football Championship
- Season: 1943
- Champions: Slavia Sofia

The 1943 Bulgarian State Football Championship was won by the PFC Slavia Sofia.

== Overview ==
This edition of the competition was contested by 26 teams. Besides teams from the present borders of Bulgaria, the 1943 season also involved teams from the areas under Bulgarian administration during much of World War II. Football clubs from Bitola and Skopje in Vardar Macedonia and Kavala in Greek Macedonia took part in the competition.

== Teams ==
The teams that participated in the competition were the winners of their local sport districts. According to the format of the competition - Sofia is having five seeds and Varna and Plovdiv two seeds each. Note that Makedonia Skopie was competing in the Sofia sport district during that season of the championship.

Sport District	Team
Sofia	Levski Sofia; Slavia Sofia; Makedonia Skopie; ZhSK Sofia; Sportist Sofia
Varna	Ticha Varna; Vladislav Varna
Plovdiv	Levski Plovdiv; Botev Plovdiv
Pleven	SP 39 Pleven
Ruse	ZhSK Ruse
Bdin	Knyaginya Maria Luisa Lom
Dobrich	Levski Dobrich
Shumen	Han Kubrat Popovo
Tarnovo	Knyaz Simeon Tarnovski Pavlikeni
Balkan	Chardafon Gabrovo
Rila	Atletik Dupnitsa
Pirin	Botev Gorna Dzhumaya
Skopje	ZhSK Skopie
Bitolya	Makedonia Bitolya
West Thrace	Belomorets Kavala
Haskovo	Botev Haskovo
Stara Zagora	Tritsvet Chirpan
Seaside	Chernomorets Burgas
Tundzha	Georgi Drazhev Yambol

== First round ==
Team 1	Agg.	Team 2	1st leg	2nd leg
Levski Dobrich	4–8	ZhSK Ruse	2–4	2–4
Belomorets Kavala	6–2	Botev Haskovo	4–1	2–1
Orel-Chegan 30 Vratsa	3–6	Knyaginya Maria Luisa Lom	1–2	2–4
Georgi Drazhev Yambol	3–4	Chernomorets Burgas	2–1	1–3 (a.e.t.)
Knyaz Simeon Tarnovski Pavlikeni	6–0	Chardafon Gabrovo	3–0	3–0
SP 39 Pleven	1–7	Sportist Sofia	1–4	0–3
ZhSK Skopie	4–0	Makedonia Bitolya	3–0	1–0
Han Kubrat Popovo	1–4	Vladislav Varna	1–1	0–3
Tritsvet Chirpan	1–7	Botev Plovdiv	1–4	0–3
ZhSK Sofia	2–0	Ticha Varna	2–0	0–0
Botev Gorna Dzhumaya	1–6	Atletik Dupnitsa	1–3	0–3
Levski Sofia	bye			
Levski Plovdiv	bye			
Slavia Sofia	bye			
Makedonia Skopie	bye			

== Second round ==
Team 1	Agg.	Team 2	1st leg	2nd leg
Sportist Sofia	9–0	Knyaginya Maria Luisa Lom	5–0	4–0
ZhSK Ruse	8–5	Vladislav Varna	2–4	6–1
Knyaz Simeon Tarnovski Pavlikeni	4–6	Chernomorets Burgas	3–4	1–2
Belomorets Kavala	2–3	Botev Plovdiv	2–1	0–2 (a.e.t.)
Levski Sofia	6–2	Atletik Dupnitsa	2–1	4–1
Levski Plovdiv	5–2	ZhSK Skopie	3–1	2–1
ZhSK Sofia	6–0	Makedonia Skopie	3–0	3–0
Slavia Sofia	bye			

== Quarter-finals ==
Team 1	Agg.	Team 2	1st leg	2nd leg
Levski Sofia	4–3	ZhSK Sofia	2–2	2–1
Sportist Sofia	2–3	Slavia Sofia	2–2	0–1
Chernomorets Burgas	0–4	Botev Plovdiv	0–1	0–3
Levski Plovdiv	7–4	ZhSK Ruse	6–1	1–3

== Semi-finals ==
Team 1	Agg.	Team 2	1st leg	2nd leg
Levski Sofia	5–1	Levski Plovdiv	3–1	2–0
Botev Plovdiv	2–6	Slavia Sofia	1–1	1–5

== Final ==
=== First game ===
10 October 1943
14:30

Slavia Sofia	1–0	Levski Sofia
Nikolov 46'	Report

Yunak Stadium, Sofia
Attendance: 12,000
Referee: Boyan Angelov

=== Second game ===
17 October 1943
14:30

Levski Sofia	0–1	Slavia Sofia
	Report	Popov 16'

Yunak Stadium, Sofia
Attendance: 13,500

Slavia Sofia won 2–0 on aggregate.
