= SK Vladislav =

Bulgarian football club

Vladislav
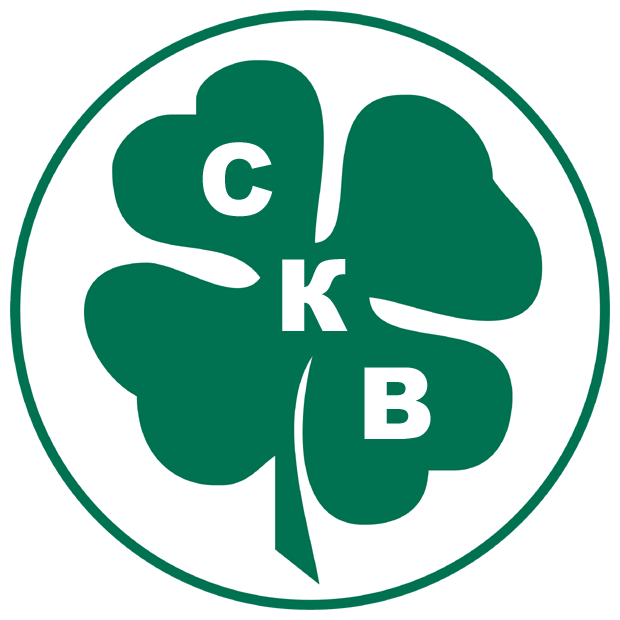
- Full name: Спортен клуб „Владислав“ Vladislav Sports Club
- Founded: 3 April 1916; 110 years ago
- Dissolved: 18 February 1945; 81 years ago
- Ground: Kolodruma Stadium; Varna, Bulgaria
Home colours	Away colours

Sporten klub Vladislav (Bulgarian: Спортен клуб „Владислав“) was a sports club from Varna, Bulgaria. During its history, Vladislav won the Bulgarian Football Championship three times. Vladislav's first title came at the inaugural championship in 1925 and its last was in 1934. Its official descendant by documents and history is Cherno More Varna.

== Honours ==
- Bulgarian State Football Championship
  - Winners (3): 1925, 1926, 1934
  - Runners-up (4): 1928, 1930, 1937–38, 1938–39

== History ==
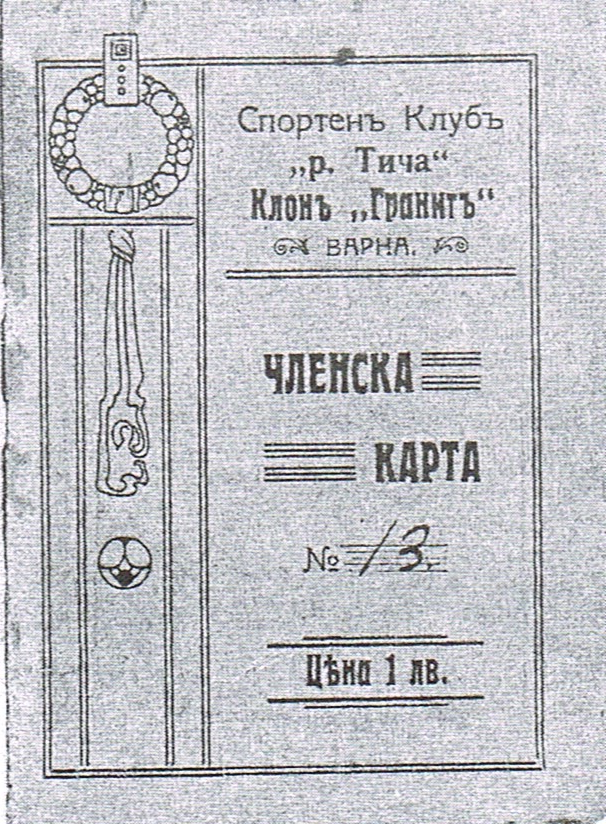
Membership card from 1920. SC Vladislav, officially registered at that time as SC Ticha-Granit branch.

Formed on 3 April 1916 as Sport Club Napred. After yearly name changes to SC Razvitie and SC Granit, the club could still not register with the Ministry of Interior until 1919 because of bureaucratic obstacles. For this reason, the board decided to enlist as a collective member of SC Ticha, which was allowed at that time. The club was officially known as SC Ticha – branch SC Granit. On the Annual general meeting of SC Ticha in the spring of 1921 a dispute and disagreement over finances broke out which resulted in the split of the club. SC Granit branch and a number of disgruntled SC Ticha members formed SC Vladislav on 1 May 1921 in honour of Władysław III, King of Poland and Hungary, who was killed in the Battle of Varna in 1444. The club was officially registered under its new name on 14 December 1921. The first green–white striped jerseys were sent from Vienna by club members studying in the Austrian capital. On 10 April 1922 the club played its first intercity match away to Levski Sofia and lost 0–5. The return match in Varna ended in a 1–1 draw. Later in the year, the newly appointed German coach Ernst Murg kick-started what turned out to be one of the success stories in pre-WWII Bulgarian football.

In 1923 Vladislav played matches against other Varna teams and Military ship crews. On 29 July the club inflicted a 4–1 defeat on visitors FC 13 Sofia and four weeks later went to Romania for a friendly which turned out to be the first international away game on record in Bulgarian football. A 2–0 win against Victoria in Constanta on 23 August followed by a 4–0 win in the return match on 9 October in Varna.

In 1924, Vladislav won the first championship of the newly formed Varna Regional League (VRL). Moreover, the club won twice in a 2 leg friendly against Venus Bucharest (3–0 and 3–1) on 12 and 30 July and lost against SC Romkomit (0–1) on 3 August in Bucharest. On 13 and 14 September Vladislav won the first and only edition of the North Bulgarian Sports League (NBSL) after two straight wins against SK Preslav (3–0) and SC Oto Gabrovo (5–1). The tournament was held in Gabrovo. As the champion of the NBSL, Vladislav was drawn to play Sofia regional champions SC Levski in a semi-final of the first Bulgarian national competition, organised by the recently formed Bulgarian National Sports Federation (BNSF). This semi-final was played in Sofia on 12 October and ended in a 0–0 draw. Due to lack of clear regulations on how to proceed in a match without a winner, the two teams did not re-play and the competition was discontinued.

In 1925 the VRL consisted of 5 teams: Vladislav, Shipchenski sokol, Ticha, Diana and Jupiter. Vladislav won 7 matches and drew once to be crowned VRL champions for a second time in 2 years. In the warm-up for the National competition, the team defeated a strong AS 23 Sofia side, 2–1 on 23 July. Defeats against Han Omurtag (4–1), Asenovec (3–0) and Levski Dupnica (4–1) earned the club a place on the final match of the competition. The final was played on 30 August in the Yunak Stadium in Sofia and the opposing side was once again Levski Sofia. The Vladislav line-up was Yanakiev–Mitev, Georgiev–Hristov, Stavrev, Bulgakov, Terzetta–Ivanov, Petrov, Aleksiev, Dimitriev. The game ended in a 2–0 win with goals from Ivanov and captain Terzetta, who was the first player ever to lift the silver cup trophy of H.M. Tzar Boris III.

In 1926 after winning its third consecutive VRL title, Vladislav was invited for a friendly by the Romanian runners-up, Juventus Bucharest. The BNSF tried to prevent this from happening as Juventus had crushed Slavia Sofia 4–0 a few weeks earlier and the Bulgaria National team had suffered a humiliating 1–6 defeat on 25 April in Bucharest. The team from Varna took no notice. On 13 June Vladislav defeated Venus 4–2 after trailing 0–2 at half-time and on the next day won against Juventus (2–1). At home, Vladislav reached the final of the National competition defeating Han Krum Shumen (3–0), Chegan Burgas (9–0) and Levski Russe (5–1). The other finalist in the Yunak Stadium on 22 August was Slavia Sofia. The Vladislav line-up was unchanged from the previous year’s final. The referee was Georgi Grigorov, who was known as one of Slavia’s founders. The match ended in a 1–1 draw with Dimitar Dimitriev scoring an equaliser. There were no goals scored in the extra time. The re-play was scheduled for the next day but Grigorov did not show up and there was no consensus reached over who would referee the match. BNSF awarded the cup to Slavia and excluded Vladislav from its ranks but the team from Varna appealed in the High Court and 3 months later the BNSF was forced to reverse its decision. A new match was scheduled for 26 December but this time the team of Slavia did not show up. The same happened on the third attempt for a re-match on 7 April 1927 and the BNSF awarded the cup to Vladislav. Slavia refused to hand over the trophy so it had to be taken away from them and brought personally to Varna by a BNSF executive.

In 1927 Vladislav became 4th time VRL champions and started preparations for the National competition. A third successive title would make them permanent holders of the silver cup. However, the BNSF suspended all matches until the new regulations were issued, the most important of which was that there would be no permanent holder of the cup and the silver trophy of the Tzar would have to change hands with every new winner of the tournament. It was also announced that the 1927 competition would not take place.

In 1928 the fifth successive VRL title was won. Ernst Murg had left his managerial position and bank executive Aleksander Blümel was running the club. Terzetta ended his career due to injury. Bulgakov, Mitev and Hristov were frequently injured or ill with their places being taken by younger generation players (Kiril Denev, Gencho Dimitrov, Stefan Danchev, Venko Dimitriev). Nevertheless, Vladislav crushed Levski Ruse (5–1) on the semi-final and AS 23 (5–1) in a test just before the final of the National competition. The final was played on 30 September and Vladislav suffered a thrashing defeat, 0–4 to Slavia.

Vladislav won its 6th VRL title in 1930. After defeating Slava Yambol (7–0) and Han Omurtag Shumen (4–2) in the National competition, the team reached the final for a record 4th time. The game was played on 3 October against old foes Slavia. Vladislav lost 1–4 in a match remembered for the blunders from keeper Zdravko Yanakiev. He left Vladislav shortly after to play for local rivals Shipchenski sokol.

In the following three years Vladislav was in crisis which forced the new chairman Luca Dorosiev to make a number of changes. He signed the attacking players Asen Myankov from Maritza Plovdiv, Stefan Boranov, Georgi Radev and keeper Zhecho Petkov from Provadiya. The defence was reinforced by club youngsters Ivan Mokanov, Panayot Georgiev and Nikola Kaldaramov.

In 1934 Vladislav won the VRL competition in a group with Sh.Sokol, Ticha, Varna, Pobeda and Bulgaria without losing a single match. In the run-up to the final of the National competition the team knocked out Han Omurtag (4–1), Botev Yambol (6–0) and Napredak Ruse (3–1). The line-up for the final was Zhecho Petkov–Ivan Mokanov, Panayot Georgiev–Nikola Kaldaramov, Tzvetan Dimitrov, Andrej Ivanov, Stefan Boranov–Asen Myankov, Kiril Denev, Evtim Filev and Venko Dimitriev. The score was opened from a close distance by Evtim Filev after the Slavia defence failed to clear the ball. Captain Kiril Denev headed a cross from Stefan Boranov for the final 2–0 victory and third National championship title for Vladislav.

In the next two years Vladislav surrendered its leading position in the VRL to SC Ticha. In 1936 the club was excluded from the league because of an irregular player. The management used the interruption for further rejuvenation of the team with a total of 11 youngsters aged 18–20. Georgi Hristov, Stoyan Ormandzhiev, Mladen Djurov and Jordan Kirchev made their names known in the regional and national competitions. On 10 July 1936 French runners-up Racing Strasbourg came to Varna after having defeated Slavia in Sofia 2–0. The French had a 2–1 lead until the last minute of the game when Georgi Hristov, known for his speed and the fact that he was playing with glasses, equalized with an individual action from the left wing.

In the VRL competition in 1937, Vladislav won all its matches against Sh.Sokol, Ticha, Pobeda, Radetzki and Asparuh and drew once against Levski to become 8th time regional champion. On 25 May, the team visited Istanbul on invitation of local club SC Pera and lost 1–3. At home, Vladislav had a tough semi-final match against Levski Ruse for the National competition which ended in a 1–1 draw after extra time. Because of injuries and suspended players Vladislav did not travel for the re-play and lost by forfeit.

In October 1937, the BNSF made a fundamental change in the way the National competition was conducted. The regional leagues were scrapped, replaced by a new National league consisting of 10 teams to play each other on home and away fixtures, causing bitter disputes between regional representatives about who was going to play in the league. Vladislav’s chairman Stefan Konstantinov made it clear that if VRL was not represented by two clubs in the league, his team would withdraw. Eventually, BNSF accepted both SC Ticha and SC Vladislav in this inaugural National league of 1938 in which SC Ticha ended up as champions and SC Vladislav as runners-up. The Vladislav team was represented by: goalkeepers Kiril Momchilov and Zdravko Yanakiev, full-backs Ivan Mokanov and StoyanOrmandzhiev, half-backs Nikola Kaldaramov, Georgi Mishkov, Tzvetan Dimitrov and Aleksandar Koev, forwards Stefan Boranov, Archangel Stojnov, Georgi Hristov, Jordan Kirchev, Lambo Atanasov, Vassil Radev and Anton Grozdanov.

In the following 1938–39 season of the National league, Vladislav was once again a runner-up, trailing one point behind champions Slavia. The title was decided in the last game of the season in a match between the two contenders on 23 July in Sofia. Slavia needed a win while a draw was good enough for Vladislav to win the title. Krum Milev from Slavia scored the winning goal in the 12 th minute of the game with a long distance deflected shot. Georgi Hristov had the chance to clinch the title for Vladislav with a last-minute attempt but after being left unmarked at the face of goal his shot went wide.

1939–40. After a mediocre performance in the autumn, Vladislav did not win a single match. The team did better in the spring but finished bottom of the table with only 11 points. Nevertheless, Vladislav secured its stay in the National division after winning the play-off against Botev Plovdiv (1–1, 2–0).

1940–41. After the first round only, the National division disintegrated because of disagreements between the clubs about its content. The old system with regional leagues and a knock-out competition between their winners was reinstated. Vladislav won its record 9th VRL title adding new power in the attack with youngsters Nedko Nedev and Mladen Djurov.

1941–1944. With the onset of the occupation of Bulgaria and the military mobilisation of many young men, Vladislav could hardly assemble a team. This was the case in the National competition when Vladislav lost by forfeit to FC 13 Sofia.

After the 9 September 1944 coup, the new government of the Fatherland Front liked to toy with the idea of wiping up everything it deemed bourgeois establishment. All leading clubs without exception underwent mergers. Following the restructuring of social and sports life under the new communist ruled government, SC Vladislav merged with SC Ticha on 18 February 1945 with all its available assets (players, coaches, finances). 13 Vladislav players were included in the merged team. These were: playing coach Ivan Mokanov, keeper Zhecho Petkov, full-backs Dimitar Dimitrov and Mancho Rachev, half-backs Nikola Kaldaramov and Georgi Georgiev, forwards Lazar Logofetov, Bogomil Kostov, Nedko Nedev, Mladen Dzhurov, Nikola Zhelev, Hristo Konakov and Atanas Konakov. Under the name Ticha-Vladislav the club took part in the first post-WWII competition. The name changed on a number of occasions to eventually become Cherno More in 1959.

== Champions teams ==
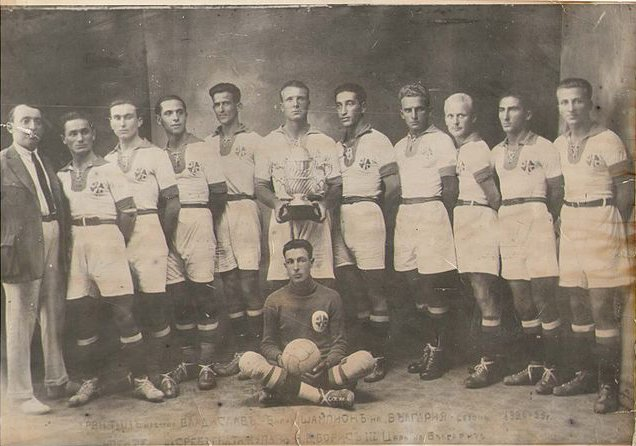
Vladislav Varna, the first champions of Bulgaria, 1925

=== 1925 and 1926 ===
- Goalkeeper: (Bulgaria) Zdravko Yanakiev
- Defenders: (Bulgaria) Lyuben Mitev, (Bulgaria) Boris Stavrev, (Bulgaria) Petar Hristov
- Midfielders: (Bulgaria) Georgi Georgiev, (Russia) Ivan Bulgakov, (Bulgaria) Gencho Hristov, (Bulgaria) Kiril Denev
- Forwards: (Bulgaria) Krastyo Petrov, (Bulgaria) Dimitar Dimitriev, (Bulgaria) Aleksi Aleksiev, (Italy) Egon Terzetta, (Bulgaria) Andrey Ivanov
- Coach: (Germany) Ernst Murg

=== 1934 ===
- Goalkeeper: (Bulgaria) Zhecho Petkov
- Defenders: (Bulgaria) Ivan Mokanov, (Bulgaria) Tsvetan Dimitrov, (Bulgaria) Panayot Georgiev
- Midfielders: (Bulgaria) Nikola Kaldaramov, (Bulgaria) Stefan Boranov, (Bulgaria) Kiril Denev
- Forwards: (Bulgaria) Venelin Dimitriev, (Bulgaria) Dimitar Dimitriev, (Bulgaria) Asen Myankov, (Bulgaria) Andrey Ivanov
- Coach: (Bulgaria) Aleksi Aleksiev
