= 1927 Bulgarian State Football Championship =

Bulgarian State Football Championship
- Season: 1927

The 1927 Bulgarian State Football Championship was not held, and thus there was no winner.

Following the bitter dispute from last season, that dragged on well into the spring of 1927, (Note: As per regulations, the final was to be replayed again in Sofia the following day. The teams were present, but the appointed referee didn't show up. BNSF immediately found among the crowd and appointed a new referee. Vladislav on their turn chose their own referee, however he declined to be in charge of the game. Nevertheless Vladislav refused to play with the BNSF appointed substitute referee and left the field. Slavia were duly awarded the match and the title. Vladislav however challenged this decision in court, and their appeal won. Because of this BNSF had to comply and a new match was scheduled for 26 Dec 1926. Both teams agreed to this, but Sofiyska OSO forbid Slavia to play as they felt the decision to revoke the awarded title was unjust. New arguments ensued and yet another date for the replay was set – 7 Apr 1927. Slavia though again complied with the decision by SOSO and boycotted the game. Because of this, this time the championship title was finally awarded to Vladislav.) Slavia Sofia, which won Sofiyska OSO (Bulgarian: окръжна спортна област, lit. 'regional sports district'), refused to enter the championship. Furthermore, only three other OSO winners were determined before the allotted deadline for participation in the State championship. Those were Vladislav Varna from Varnenska OSO, Levski Ruse from Rusenska OSO and Levski Plovdiv from Plovdivska OSO. Because of this the championship for this season had to be cancelled.
