= 1932 Bulgarian State Football Championship =

Bulgarian State Football Championship
- Season: 1932
- Champions: Shipchenski sokol Varna

The 1932 Bulgarian State Football Championship was the ninth edition of the Bulgarian State Football Championship, the national football competition in Bulgaria. It was contested by 13 teams, and it was won by Shipchenski sokol Varna, the team that had lost the Championship's previous final.

== First round ==
Team 1	Score	Team 2
Slavia Sofia	4–0	Levski Dupnitsa
Orel-Chegan 30 Vratsa	2–1	Levski Lom
Shipchenski sokol Varna	6–2	Han Omurtag Shumen
Slava Yambol	3–0	Borislav Stara Zagora
Chardafon Gabrovo	1–3	Pobeda 26 Pleven
Levski Ruse	bye	
Sokol Plovdiv	bye	
Bulgaria Haskovo	bye	

== Quarter-finals ==
Team 1	Score	Team 2
Slavia Sofia	5–0	Slava Yambol
Levski Ruse	0–2	Shipchenski sokol Varna
Pobeda 26 Pleven	3–2	Orel-Chegan 30 Vratsa
Sokol Plovdiv	3–1	Bulgaria Haskovo

== Semi-finals ==
Team 1	Score	Team 2
Slavia Sofia	5–0	Sokol Plovdiv
Shipchenski sokol Varna	4–1	Pobeda 26 Pleven

== Final ==
18 September 1932

Slavia Sofia	1–2 (a.e.t.)	Shipchenski sokol Varna
Staykov 63'		Naydenov 12'; Bulashev 112'

AS-23 Stadium, Sofia
Attendance: 10,000
