= Dimitar Isakov =

Bulgarian footballer (born 1924)

Personal information
- Date of birth: 25 June 1924
- Place of birth: Dupnitsa, Bulgaria
- Position: Forward

Senior career*
Years	Team	Apps	(Gls)
1939–1952	Marek Dupnitsa		
1952	Slavia Sofia		
1953–1962	Marek Dupnitsa		

International career
	Bulgaria	6	(1)
- * Club domestic league appearances and goals

Dimitar Isakov (Bulgarian: Димитър Исаков; born 25 June 1924) is a Bulgarian retired football player. Isakov was a central forward.

Isakov was born in Dupnitsa. During his career, he played for PFC Marek Dupnitsa and PFC Slavia Sofia. He was the Bulgarian League's top goalscorer during the 1951–52 season, scoring 10 goals for Slavia. Isakov has 6 matches and 1 goal for Bulgaria national football team.

== Awards ==
Slavia Sofia

- Bulgarian Cup: 1952
- A PFG top goalscorer: 1952 with 10 goals
