= Kiril Denev =

Bulgarian footballer

Personal information
- Date of birth: 1905
- Position: Midfielder

International career
Years	Team	Apps	(Gls)
1926	Bulgaria	1	(1)

Kiril Denev (born 1905, date of death unknown) was a Bulgarian footballer. He played in one match for the Bulgaria national football team in 1926. He was also part of Bulgaria's squad for the football tournament at the 1924 Summer Olympics, but he did not play in any matches.
