= Belomorets Svetlen =

Football club in Bulgaria

- Short name: Belomorets (Bulgarian: Беломорец)
- Founded: 1945
- Ground: Hadzhi Dimitar football field
- League: (Bulgaria) OFG Targovishte-West

Belomorets (Bulgarian: Беломорец) is a Bulgarian football club from the village of Svetlen, Targovishte Province. The club is currently playing in the "B" division of OFG Targovishte-West.

== History ==
It was founded in 1945 with four players from the disbanded club Belomorets Kavala, founded in 1941, which had a ninth place (1/8-final) in the Bulgarian State Football Championship in 1943.

The club is a long-time participant in the regional group Targovishte, and briefly played in the Northeast "V" AFG. The team was on a long hiatus through the 1990s. In the 2000/2001 season, the club entered the "A" OFG Targovishte-West and finished in fifth place. The team plays its home games at the Hadzhi Dimitar football field in Svetlen.
