= 1934 Bulgarian State Football Championship =

Bulgarian State Football Championship
- Season: 1934
- Champions: Vladislav Varna

The 1934 Bulgarian State Football Championship was the 11th edition of the Bulgarian State Football Championship, the national football competition in Bulgaria.

== Overview ==
It was contested by 14 teams, and Vladislav Varna won the championship.

== First round ==
| Team 1 | Score | Team 2 |
|---|---|---|
| Slavia Sofia | 8–0 | Pobeda 26 Pleven |
| Han Omurtag Shumen | 1–4 | Vladislav Varna |
| Maria Luisa Lom | 3–2 | Orel-Chegan 30 Vratsa |
| Shipka Plovdiv | 1–4 | Botev Yambol |
| Napredak Ruse | 3–1 (a.e.t.) | Chardafon Gabrovo |
| Svetoslav Stara Zagora | 4–3 (a.e.t.) | Levski Burgas |
| Borislav Kyustendil | bye | |
| Bulgaria Haskovo | bye | |

== Quarter-finals ==
| Team 1 | Score | Team 2 |
|---|---|---|
| Slavia Sofia | 9–1 | Borislav Kyustendil |
| Napredak Ruse | 3–2 (a.e.t.) | Maria Luisa Lom |
| Vladislav Varna | 6–0 | Botev Yambol |
| Svetoslav Stara Zagora | 5–1 | Bulgaria Haskovo |

== Semi-finals ==
9 September 1934

| Slavia Sofia | 4–0 | Svetoslav Stara Zagora |
|---|---|---|
| Staykov; Baykushev; Romanov |

11 September 1934

| Vladislav Varna | 3–1 | Napredak Ruse |
|---|---|---|
| Myankov 19', 43'; Mokanov 29' (pen.) | | Mokanov 37' (o.g.) |

== Final ==
16 September 1934

| Slavia Sofia | 0–2 | Vladislav Varna |
|---|---|---|
| | | V. Dimitriev 20'; Denev 30' |

Yunak Stadium, Sofia
Attendance: 10,000
Referee: Ivan Batandzhiev (Sofia)
