= Krum Milev =

Bulgarian footballer and manager

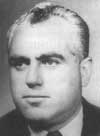

Personal information
- Date of birth: 11 June 1915
- Place of birth: Sofia, Bulgaria
- Date of death: 19 April 2000 (aged 84)
- Place of death: Sofia, Bulgaria
- Position: Striker

Youth career
- 1929–1932: Luben Karavelov

Senior career*
Years	Team	Apps	(Gls)
1932–1935	Botev Sofia		
1935–1939	Slavia Sofia	44	(26)
1939–1948	Lokomotiv Sofia	107	(48)

International career
1937–1948	Bulgaria	18	(3)

Managerial career
- 1948–1964: CSKA Sofia
- 1954–1960: Bulgaria
- 1966–1968: Beroe Stara Zagora
- 1968–1969: Beşiktaş
- * Club domestic league appearances and goals

Krum Milev (Bulgarian: Крум Милев) was a Bulgarian football player and manager. He is often considered as the most successful Bulgarian coach.

He played for Botev Sofia, Slavia Sofia and Lokomotiv Sofia. He obtained 18 caps with Bulgaria.

He was the topscorer of the Bulgarian National Football Division 1937-38.

He managed CSKA Sofia, winning the Bulgarian league 11 times with them, Bulgaria, Beroe Stara Zagora and Beşiktaş.

Milev holds the record for the longest serving manager (of a single club) in Bulgarian football, having been in charge of CSKA Sofia for 16 years.
