= 1938–39 Bulgarian National Football Division =

Bulgarian National Football Division
- Season: 1938–39
- Country: Bulgaria
- Champions: Slavia Sofia
- Relegated: Chernomorets Burgas

The 1938–39 season of the Bulgarian National Football Division was contested by 10 teams, and PFC Slavia Sofia won the championship.

== League standings ==
Pos	Team	Pld	W	D	L	GF	GA	GD	Pts
1	Slavia Sofia	18	11	1	6	30	25	+5	23
2	Vladislav Varna	18	9	4	5	26	15	+11	22
3	Ticha Varna	18	9	4	5	18	18	0	22
4	AS 23 Sofia	18	10	1	7	38	25	+13	21
5	Sportclub Plovdiv	18	8	4	6	28	21	+7	20
6	Levski Sofia	18	8	2	8	29	25	+4	18
7	Levski Ruse	18	6	6	6	28	25	+3	18
8	FK 13 Sofia	18	6	5	7	28	27	+1	17
9	Shipka Sofia	18	6	3	9	28	28	0	15
10	Chernomorets Burgas	18	0	4	14	17	61	−44	4

Source: rsssf.com

== Results ==
Home \ Away	A23	CHB	F13	LVR	LEV	SHI	SLA	SCP	TIC	VLA
AS 23 Sofia		3–1	4–2	3–0	0–0	3–1	4–2	1–0	2–0	1–2
Chernomorets Burgas	2–9		0–3	0–5	1–3	0–6	1–4	2–7	1–2	0–3
FC 13 Sofia	4–0	1–1		1–1	1–3	3–3	0–0	2–1	0–1	0–2
Levski Ruse	1–0	2–0	0–0		3–4	1–4	4–0	0–0	2–0	1–1
Levski Sofia	0–1	3–1	4–2	2–2		3–0	0–3	0–1	1–2	0–2
Shipka Sofia	1–3	1–1	2–0	2–1	2–1		4–0	0–2	0–0	1–3
Slavia Sofia	3–1	3–1	3–2	3–0	1–0	2–1		1–0	0–1	0–3
Sportclub Plovdiv	2–1	2–2	1–2	1–3	2–1	2–0	3–2		0–0	1–2
Ticha Varna	2–1	2–1	1–3	3–1	1–3	1–0	0–2	1–1		0–0
Vladislav Varna	2–1	2–2	0–2	1–1	0–1	2–0	0–1	1–2	0–1	

Legend: Blue = home team win; Yellow = draw; Red = away team win.
