= Yanko Stoyanov =

Bulgarian footballer (1913–1946)

Personal information
- Date of birth: 1913
- Place of birth: Sofia, Bulgaria
- Date of death: 1946 (aged 32–33)
- Position: Midfielder

Senior career*
Years	Team	Apps	(Gls)
- Botev Sofia
1935–1940	Levski Sofia		

International career
1939–1940	Bulgaria	2	(1)
- * Club domestic league appearances and goals

Yanko Stoyanov (Bulgarian: Янко Стоянов; 1913–1946) was a Bulgarian footballer who played as a midfielder.

== Club career ==
Stoyanov joined Levski Sofia from Botev Sofia in 1935. He was the top scorer in the 1939–40 Bulgarian National Football Division with 14 goals.

== International career ==
On 22 October 1939, Stoyanov made his debut for Bulgaria, starting in a 2–1 loss against Germany, before being substituted at half-time. On 6 June 1940, on his second and final appearance for Bulgaria, Stoyanov scored the opening goal in a 4–1 loss against Slovakia.

=== International goals ===
Scores and results list Bulgaria's goal tally first.

#	Date	Venue	Opponent	Score	Result	Competition
1	6 June 1940	Yunak Stadium, Sofia, Bulgaria	Slovakia	1–0	1–4	Friendly
