= FC Shipka Sofia =

- Full name: Football Club Shipka Sofia
- Nickname: The Sky Blues
- Founded: 2 May 1923; 103 years ago
- Dissolved: 1944; 82 years ago
| Home colours | Away colours |

FC Shipka (Bulgarian: ФК Шипка) was a Bulgarian football club based in Sofia.

== History ==
The club was founded as FC Sparta on 2 May 1923 as the result of the merger between local clubs Pobeda Kyulyutsite and Mefisto. It took on the name of Shipka on 7 October 1924 in honor of the historic Battle of Shipka Pass. Five years later, in 1929, the club earned promotion to the First Division of Sofia for the first time in their history.

In 1937, the club won promotion to the Bulgarian State Football Championship, where it remained for three consecutive seasons. Its highest achievement was winning the Bulgarian Cup in 1939. Shipka was dissolved in November 1944, when it merged with AS-23 to form FC Chavdar Sofia.

Despite its relatively short existence, Shipka occupies a significant place in Bulgarian football history as it was a predecessor to CSKA Sofia, the most successful club in Bulgarian history.

== Honours ==
Bulgarian State Football Championship

- Third place: 1937–38

Bulgarian Cup

- Winners: 1939
