= 1930 Bulgarian State Football Championship =

Bulgarian State Football Championship
- Season: 1930
- Champions: Slavia Sofia

The 1930 Bulgarian State Football Championship was the seventh edition of the competition. It was contested by 9 teams, and won by Slavia Sofia, who defeated Vladislav Varna 4–1 in the final. This was the club's second title.

== Qualified teams ==
The winners from each OSO (Bulgarian: окръжна спортна област, lit. 'regional sports district') qualify for the State championship.

OSO	Team
Varnenska OSO	Vladislav Varna
Shumenska OSO	Han Omurtag Shumen
Rusenska OSO	Rakovski Ruse
Tarnovska OSO	Etar Tarnovo (Note: The contemporary name of Tarnovo is Veliko Tarnovo.)
Plevenska OSO	no representative
Vrachanska OSO	no representative
Bdinska OSO	Viktoria 23 Vidin
Sofiyska OSO	Slavia Sofia
Rilska OSO	Krakra Pernik
Plovdivska OSO	Botev Plovdiv
Haskovska OSO	no representative
Starozagorska OSO	no representative
Primorska OSO	Slava Yambol

== First round ==
Team 1	Score	Team 2
Vladislav Varna	7–1	Slava Yambol
Rakovski Ruse	0–6	Han Omurtag Shumen
Etar Tarnovo	6–2	Viktoria 23 Vidin
Krakra Pernik	0–4	Slavia Sofia
Botev Plovdiv	bye	

== Quarter-finals ==
Team 1	Score	Team 2
Vladislav Varna	4–2	Han Omurtag Shumen
Slavia Sofia	4–2	Etar Tarnovo
Botev Plovdiv	bye	

== Semi-finals ==
Team 1	Score	Team 2
Slavia Sofia	2–1	Botev Plovdiv
Vladislav Varna	bye	

== Final ==
3 October 1930

Slavia Sofia	4–1	Vladislav Varna
Staykov 11', 64'; Rafailov 24'; Manolov 35'		Ivanov 70'

Levski Playing Field, Sofia
Attendance: 10,000
Referee: Ivan Batandzhiev (Sofia)
