= Lyuben Kostov =

Bulgarian footballer

Personal information
- Date of birth: 8 March 1935 (age 91)
- Place of birth: Varna, Bulgaria
- Height: 1.80 m (5 ft 11 in)
- Position: Striker

Senior career*
Years	Team	Apps	(Gls)
1954–1957	Cherno More	65	(20)
1958–1962	Spartak Varna	56	(19)

International career
1960–1961	Bulgaria	4	(1)
- * Club domestic league appearances and goals

Lyuben Kostov (Bulgarian: Любен Костов) (born 8 March 1935) is a former Bulgarian footballer. He was the top scorer of the 1960 championship (with 12 goals for Spartak Varna).
