= 1935 Bulgarian State Football Championship =

Bulgarian State Football Championship
- Season: 1935
- Champions: Sportklub Sofia

The Bulgarian State Football Championship in 1935 was contested by 13 clubs and won by Sportklub Sofia. Its format was based on the principle of direct elimination until 1944, when a league format was adopted and the tournament name was changed to the Bulgarian Republic Football Championship.

== First round ==
Team 1	Score	Team 2
Maria Luisa Lom	1–1 (a.e.t.)	Sportklub Sofia
FC Strumska slava	0–1	Orel-Chegan 30 Vratsa
Napredak Ruse	3–3 (a.e.t.)	DFV Kazanlak
Pobeda 26 Pleven	3–2	Botev Yambol
Levski Gorna Oryahovitsa	0–6	Panayot Volov Shumen
Botev Pazardzhik	bye	
Levski Burgas	bye	
Replay
Maria Luisa Lom	0–3 (w/o)	Sportklub Sofia
Napredak Ruse	2–0	DFV Kazanlak

== Quarter-finals ==
Team 1	Score	Team 2
Sportklub Sofia	2–1	Orel-Chegan 30 Vratsa
Botev Pazardzhik	7–1	Pobeda 26 Pleven
Ticha Varna	3–0^{1}	Levski Burgas
Panayot Volov Shumen	3–2	Napredak Ruse

- ^{1}The match was originally finished 0–1 for Levski Burgas but the result was voided because the team who was won the match fielded the ineligible player, so the match was replayed in Sofia.

== Semi-finals ==
Team 1	Score	Team 2
Sportklub Sofia	1–0	Panayot Volov Shumen
Ticha Varna	7–0	Botev Pazardzhik

== Final ==
3 October 1935

Sportklub Sofia	4–0	Ticha Varna

Sofia
