= 1928 Bulgarian State Football Championship =

Bulgarian State Football Championship
- Season: 1928
- Champions: Slavia Sofia

The 1928 Bulgarian State Football Championship was the fifth edition of the Bulgarian State Football Championship, the national football competition in Bulgaria. It was contested by 5 teams, and Slavia Sofia won the championship, defeating Vladislav Varna 4–0 in the final.

== Qualified teams ==
The winners from each OSO (Bulgarian: окръжна спортна област, lit. 'regional sports district') qualify for the State championship. (Note: Only five teams were admitted to the championship as many OSOs again didn't determine their winners before the deadline. For most of the OSOs from the south of the country this was also due to the two devastating earthquakes near Chirpan in April 1928.)

OSO	Team
Varnenska OSO	Vladislav Varna
Rusenska OSO	Levski Ruse
Bdinska OSO	Maria Luisa Lom
Sofiyska OSO	Slavia Sofia
Plovdivska OSO	Levski Plovdiv

== Quarter-finals ==
Team 1	Score	Team 2
Maria Luisa Lom	0–4	Slavia Sofia
Levski Plovdiv	bye	
Levski Ruse	bye	
Vladislav Varnaski Plovdiv	bye	

== Semi-finals ==
Team 1	Score	Team 2
Vladislav Varna	5–1	Levski Ruse
Slavia Sofia	4–0	Levski Plovdiv

== Final ==
30 September 1928

Slavia Sofia	4–0	Vladislav Varna
Manolov 5', ??'; Romanov 15'; Stoyanov 83'

Yunak Stadium, Sofia
Attendance: 15,000
Referee: Friedrich Klüd
