= 1926 Bulgarian State Football Championship =

Bulgarian State Football Championship
- Season: 1926
- Champions: Vladislav Varna

The 1926 Bulgarian State Football Championship was the third edition of the Bulgarian State Football Championship. It was contested by 11 teams, and Vladislav Varna won the championship.

== Qualified teams ==
There was a change in the competition. The six regional sports federations were disbanded and several "okrazhni sportni oblasti" (Bulgarian: окръжни спортни области, lit. 'regional sports district'), covering lesser area than their predecessors, were created in their place. Again, the winners from each OSO qualified for the State championship.

OSO	Team
Varnenska OSO	Vladislav Varna
Shumenska OSO	Sokol Shumen
Rusenska OSO	Levski Ruse
Tarnovska OSO	Etar Tarnovo (Note: The contemporary name of Tarnovo is Veliko Tarnovo.)
Plevenska OSO	no representative
Vrachanska OSO	Orel Vratsa
Bdinska OSO	no representative
Sofiyska OSO	Slavia Sofia
Rilska OSO	Levski Dupnitsa
Plovdivska OSO	Botev Pazardzhik
Haskovska OSO	Borislav Borisovgrad (Note: The contemporary name of Borisovgrad is Parvomay.)
Starozagorska OSO	Beroya Stara Zagora
Primorska OSO	Chegan Burgas

== First round ==
Team 1	Score	Team 2
Sokol Shumen	6–0	Etar Tarnovo
Slavia Sofia	9–1	Levski Dupnitsa
Botev Pazardzhik	4–0	Beroya Stara Zagora
Chegan Burgas	4–1	Borislav Borisovgrad
Orel Vratsa	bye	
Vladislav Varna	bye	
Levski Ruse	bye	

== Quarter-finals ==
Team 1	Score	Team 2
Vladislav Varna	9–0	Chegan Burgas
Levski Ruse	1–0	Sokol Shumen
Botev Pazardzhik	5–1	Orel Vratsa
Slavia Sofia	bye	

== Semi-finals ==
Team 1	Score	Team 2
Vladislav Varna	5–1	Levski Ruse
Botev Pazardzhik	2–6	Slavia Sofia

== Final ==
The final, played on 22 August 1926, (Note: As per regulations, the final was to be replayed again in Sofia the following day. The teams were present, but the appointed referee didn't show up. BNSF immediately found among the crowd and appointed a new referee. Vladislav on their turn chose their own referee, however he declined to be in charge of the game. Nevertheless Vladislav refused to play with the BNSF appointed substitute referee and left the field. Slavia were duly awarded the match and the title. Vladislav however challenged this decision in court, and their appeal won. Because of this BNSF had to comply and a new match was scheduled for 26 Dec 1926. Both teams agreed to this, but Sofiyska OSO forbid Slavia to play as they felt the decision to revoke the awarded title was unjust. New arguments ensued and yet another date for the replay was set - 7 Apr 1927. Slavia though again complied with the decision by SOSO and boycotted the game. Because of this, this time the championship title was finally awarded to Vladislav.) with the replays on 23 Aug 1926, 26 Dec 1926 and 7 Apr 1927.

=== First game ===
22 August 1926

Slavia Sofia	1–1	Vladislav Varna
Grashev 20'		Petrov 32'

Levski Playing Field, Sofia
Attendance: 10,000
Referee: Georgi Grigorov

=== Second game ===
7 April 1927

Slavia Sofia	0–3 (w/o)	Vladislav Varna

Levski Playing Field, Sofia
