= 1936 Bulgarian State Football Championship =

Bulgarian State Football Championship
- Season: 1936
- Champions: Slavia Sofia

The 1936 Bulgarian State Football Championship was the 13th edition of the Bulgarian State Football Championship, the national football competition in Bulgaria.

== Overview ==
It was contested by 12 teams, and PFC Slavia Sofia won the championship.

== First round ==
Team 1	Score	Team 2
Viktoria 23 Vidin	4–2	Pobeda 26 Pleven
Levski Ruse	3–0	Panayot Volov Shumen
Minyor Pernik	2–1	Hadzhi Slavchev Pavlikeni
Georgi Drazhev Yambol	8–0	Urli Harmanli
Ticha Varna	bye	
Botev Plovdiv	bye	
Slavia Sofia	bye	
Levski Burgas	bye	

== Quarter-finals ==
Team 1	Score	Team 2
Levski Ruse	0–1	Minyor Pernik
Georgi Drazhev Yambol	1–0	Botev Plovdiv
Ticha Varna	1–0	Levski Burgas
Viktoria 23 Vidin	1–6	Slavia Sofia

== Semi-finals ==
Team 1	Score	Team 2
Slavia Sofia	6–0	Georgi Drazhev Yambol
Ticha Varna	1–0	Minyor Pernik

== Final ==
18 October 1936

Slavia Sofia	2–0	Ticha Varna
Milev 22'; Sarmov ??'

Levski Playing Field, Sofia
Attendance: 10,000
Referee: Todor Atanasov (Sofia)
