= Dimitar Manolov =

Bulgarian footballer

Personal information
- Date of birth: 1901
- Place of birth: Boyana, Bulgaria
- Date of death: 1979 (aged 77–78)
- Place of death: Sofia, Bulgaria
- Position: Midfielder

International career
Years	Team	Apps	(Gls)
1924–1929	Bulgaria	8	(1)

Dimitar Manolov (1901 – 1979) was a Bulgarian footballer. He played in eight matches for the Bulgaria national football team from 1924 to 1929. He was also part of Bulgaria's squad for the football tournament at the 1924 Summer Olympics, but he did not play in any matches.
