= 1931 Bulgarian State Football Championship =

Bulgarian State Football Championship
- Season: 1931
- Champions: AS 23 Sofia

The 1931 Bulgarian State Football Championship was the eighth edition of the competition. It was contested by 12 teams, and it was won by AS 23 Sofia. This was the club's first title.

== Qualified teams ==
The winners from each OSO (Bulgarian: окръжна спортна област, lit. 'regional sports district') qualify for the State championship.

OSO	Team
Varnenska OSO	Shipchenski sokol Varna
Shumenska OSO	Han Omurtag Shumen
Rusenska OSO	Napredak Ruse
Tarnovska OSO	Etar Tarnovo (Note: The contemporary name of Tarnovo is Veliko Tarnovo.)
Plevenska OSO	Pobeda 26 Pleven
Vrachanska OSO	Orel-Chegan 30 Vratsa
Bdinska OSO	Sportist Vidin
Sofiyska OSO	AS 23 Sofia (Note: The full name of AS 23 Sofia is Atletik-Slava 23.)
Rilska OSO	Levski Dupnitsa
Plovdivska OSO	Botev Plovdiv
Haskovska OSO	Bulgaria Haskovo
Starozagorska OSO	no representative
Primorska OSO	Slava Yambol

== First round ==
Team 1	Score	Team 2
Shipchenski sokol Varna	1–0	Botev Plovdiv
Slava Yambol	3–1	Sportist Vidin
AS 23 Sofia	5–0	Etar Tarnovo
Napredak Ruse	3–1	Pobeda 26 Pleven
Han Omurtag Shumen	2–0	Levski Dupnitsa
Bulgaria Haskovo	6–2	Orel-Chegan 30 Vratsa

== Quarter-finals ==
Team 1	Score	Team 2
AS 23 Sofia	7–0	Slava Yambol
Shipchenski sokol Varna	5–1	Bulgaria Haskovo
Napredak Ruse	3–1	Han Omurtag Shumen

== Semi-finals ==
Team 1	Score	Team 2
AS 23 Sofia	3–1	Napredak Ruse
Shipchenski sokol Varna	bye	

== Final ==
The final, played on 13 September 1931: (Note: The match was abandoned in 73' at 1:2 for Shipchenski sokol, when after a clash a player from the Varna team had to leave the field with a broken leg. The Varna players demand from the referee to show a red card to the AS 23 player that participated in the collision, but the referee refused to send him off, as he judged that there was no intention in the AS 23 player's action. At that, Shipchenski sokol left the field. Later it was awarded 3:0 to AS 23 by the BNSF.)

Team 1	Score	Team 2
AS 23 Sofia	3–0 (w/o)	Shipchenski sokol Varna
