= 1937 Bulgarian State Football Championship =

Bulgarian State Football Championship
- Season: 1937
- Champions: Levski Sofia

The Bulgarian State Football Championship in the 1937 season was contested by 14 teams. The championship was won by Levski Sofia, which defeated Levski Ruse 1-1, and 3-0 in the two games in the final.

== First round ==
Team 1	Score	Team 2
Belite orli Pleven	4–1	Tsar Krum Byala Slatina
Hadzhi Slavchev Pavlikeni	3–1	ZhSK Stara Zagora
Levski Sofia	7–1	Levski Dupnitsa
Vladislav Varna	3–0 (w/o)	Panayot Volov Shumen
Levski Ruse	3–0	Bdin Vidin
Georgi Drazhev Yambol	3–2	Chernomorets Burgas
Botev Plovdiv	6–0	Bulgaria Haskovo

== Quarter-finals ==
Team 1	Score	Team 2
Levski Ruse	2–0	Belite orli Pleven
Botev Plovdiv	4–0	Hadzhi Slavchev Pavlikeni
Vladislav Varna	1–0	Georgi Drazhev Yambol
Levski Sofia	bye	

== Semi-finals ==
Team 1	Score	Team 2
Levski Sofia	1–0	Botev Plovdiv
Levski Ruse	1–1 (a.e.t.)	Vladislav Varna
Replay
Levski Ruse	3–0 (w/o)	Vladislav Varna

== Final ==
=== First game ===
3 October 1937

Levski Sofia	1–1	Levski Ruse
Lozanov		Toporov

Sofia

=== Second game ===
5 October 1937

Levski Sofia	3–0	Levski Ruse
Lozanov; Peshev; Grigorov

Sofia
