= 1924 Bulgarian State Football Championship =

Tournament details
- Country: Bulgaria

Final positions
- Champions: None

Tournament statistics
- Matches played: 4
- Goals scored: 15 (3.75 per match)

The 1924 Bulgarian State Football Championship was the first edition of the Bulgarian State Football Championship, the first national football competition in Bulgaria. It was contested by 6 teams. The championship was not finished and there wasn't any winner.

At the semi-finals, in match between Vladislav Varna and Levski Sofia was not judged to be played to extra time due to insufficient light to continue the game. Vladislav refused to replay the game on the next day in Sofia, and left for Varna, demanding the replay to be staged there. The Bulgarian National Sports Federation (BNSF) at first set a new date for the replay, which was again to take place in Sofia, then gave in and allowed for the game to be played in Varna, but only if Vladislav and the North-Bulgarian sports federation covered the losses for the Sofia replay. That condition was not met. In the end BNSF and Vladislav did not reach an agreement and the championship was abandoned.

== Teams ==
The teams that participated in the competition were the six winners of their local sport federations.

Federation	Team
North-Bulgarian sport federation	Vladislav Varna
Sofia sport federation	Levski Sofia
Seaside sport federation	Chernomorets Burgas
Thracian sport federation	Pobeda Plovdiv
South-west sport federation	Krakra Pernik
Bdin sport federation	Orel Vratsa

== Quarter-finals ==
Team 1	Score	Team 2
Chernomorets Burgas	0–7	Levski Sofia
Orel Vratsa	3–0	Krakra Pernik
Pobeda Plovdiv	bye	
Vladislav Varna	bye	

== Semi-finals ==
Team 1	Score	Team 2
Pobeda Plovdiv	5–0	Orel Vratsa
Levski Sofia	0–0	Vladislav Varna
