= Bulgarian State Football Championship =

National football league

- Sport: Football
- Founded: 1924
- Folded: 1944
- No. of teams: 5–26
- Country: Bulgaria
- Most titles: Slavia Sofia (6 titles)
- Related competitions: Republic Championship; Bulgarian A Football Group

The State Football Championship was the first national football competition in Bulgaria. It was organised between 1924 and 1944 by the Bulgarian National Sport Federation.

The championship did not finish in the years 1924, 1927 and 1944 because of different reasons. After 1944 it was replaced by the Republic Championship.

== Format ==
The championship was a knockout tournament featuring six clubs that had won six regional divisions. These divisions were round-robin tournaments that included football clubs that were founded in different geographic areas. The winners of each division were drawn in pairs at random for each of the three one-match rounds. Two of the clubs qualified directly for the second round (the semi-final stage) and the other four had to play two quarter-final matches.

The championship had many changes in its format over the years, mainly in the number of legs played in each round and the number of teams that qualified from the regional divisions. In the 1937–38, 1938–39 and 1939–40 seasons, the championship was reorganised to a 10-club National Football Division but it proved to be an unsuccessful decision and from the 1940–41 season the division was reverted to a knockout tournament.

== Winners ==
Season	Champions (titles)	Runner-up	Third place
1924	Not finished		
1925	Vladislav Varna (1)	Levski Sofia	–
1926	Vladislav Varna (2)	Slavia Sofia	–
1927	Not held		
1928	Slavia Sofia (1)	Vladislav Varna	–
1929	Botev Plovdiv (1)	Levski Sofia	–
1930	Slavia Sofia (2)	Vladislav Varna	–
1931	AS 23 Sofia (1)	Spartak Varna	–
1932	Spartak Varna (1)	Slavia Sofia	–
1933	Levski Sofia (1)	Spartak Varna	–
1934	Vladislav Varna (3)	Slavia Sofia	–
1935	Sportklub Sofia (1)	Ticha Varna	–
1936	Slavia Sofia (3)	Ticha Varna	–
1937	Levski Sofia (2)	Levski Ruse	–
1937–38	Ticha Varna (1)	Vladislav Varna	Shipka Sofia
1938–39	Slavia Sofia (4)	Vladislav Varna	Ticha Varna
1939–40	ZhSK Sofia (1)	Levski Sofia	Slavia Sofia
1941	Slavia Sofia (5)	ZhSK Sofia	–
1942	Levski Sofia (3)	Makedonia Skopie	–
1943	Slavia Sofia (6)	Levski Sofia	–
1944	Not finished, due to World War II		

== Performances ==
=== Performance by club ===
Key
Italics indicates defunct clubs.

Club	Winners	Runners-up	Third place
Slavia Sofia	6	3	1
Vladislav Varna	3	4	—
Levski Sofia	3	4	—
Shipchenski Sokol	1	2	—
Ticha Varna	1	2	1
ZhSK Sofia	1	1	—
Botev Plovdiv	1	—	—
Athletic Slava 1923	1	—	—
Sportklub Sofia	1	—	—
Levski Ruse	—	1	—
Makedonia Skopie	—	1	—
Shipka Sofia	—	—	1

=== Performance by city ===
City	Winners	Runners-up	Third place
Sofia	12	8	2
Varna	5	8	1
Plovdiv	1	—	—
Ruse	—	1	—
Skopje (Note: Skopje, was part of Bulgaria when Makedonia Skopie reached the championship final in 1942.)	—	1	—

== See also ==
- Bulgarian Republic Football Championship (Champions 1945–1948)
- Bulgarian A Football Group (Champions 1948–present)
