= 1937–38 Bulgarian National Football Division =

Football league season

Bulgarian National Football Division
- Season: 1937–38
- Country: Bulgaria
- Champions: Ticha Varna
- Relegated: Botev Plovdiv; Georgi Drazhev Yambol

The 1937–38 season of the Bulgarian State Football Championship was contested by 10 teams, and Ticha Varna won the championship.

== League standings ==
Pos	Team	Pld	W	D	L	GF	GA	GD	Pts
1	Ticha Varna	18	9	7	2	26	17	+9	25
2	Vladislav Varna	18	8	6	4	42	20	+22	22
3	Shipka Sofia	18	8	6	4	33	21	+12	22
4	FC 13 Sofia	18	8	4	6	31	30	+1	20
5	Slavia Sofia	18	8	4	6	30	30	0	20
6	Levski Ruse	18	7	5	6	27	23	+4	19
7	Levski Sofia	18	7	4	7	30	26	+4	18
8	Chernomorets Burgas	18	4	4	10	30	40	−10	12
9	Botev Plovdiv	18	5	2	11	28	44	−16	12
10	Georgi Drazhev Yambol	18	3	4	11	18	44	−26	10

Source: rsssf.com

== Results ==
Home \ Away	BPD	CHB	F13	GEO	LVR	LEV	SHI	SLA	TIC	VLA
Botev Plovdiv		3–1	5–1	2–0	0–3	3–1	1–1	1–5	2–4	2–0
Chernomorets Burgas	2–1		2–3	8–0	0–1	1–6	0–1	2–3	0–1	1–1
FC 13 Sofia	4–1	2–2		2–1	2–0	1–0	0–3	1–2	1–4	3–3
Georgi Drazhev Yambol	1–1	2–4	0–2		1–4	2–0	0–0	1–1	0–1	0–3
Levski Ruse	3–1	4–0	0–1	4–1		1–1	3–1	1–1	0–0	0–3
Levski Sofia	2–1	2–2	2–1	3–2	0–0		1–1	5–1	4–1	1–3
Shipka Sofia	3–1	3–1	1–4	7–0	2–1	2–0		1–2	1–2	2–2
Slavia Sofia	4–3	1–2	0–0	0–3	6–1	0–2	0–1		0–0	2–1
Ticha Varna	2–0	2–2	2–1	1–1	1–1	1–0	1–1	1–2		2–1
Vladislav Varna	7–0	4–0	2–2	1–3	2–0	3–0	2–2	4–0	0–0	

Legend: Blue = home team win; Yellow = draw; Red = away team win.
