= SK Ticha =

Ticha
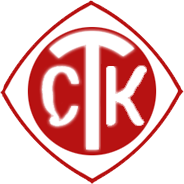
- Full name: Спортен клуб „Тича“ Ticha Sports Club
- Founded: 3 March 1913; 113 years ago
- Dissolved: 18 February 1945; 81 years ago

Sporten klub Ticha (Bulgarian: Спортен клуб „Тича“) is a defunct Bulgarian sports club, from Varna, one of predecessors of Cherno More Varna.

== History ==
Ticha was created on 3 March 1913 as Galata. On 24 May 1914 the club was merged with Sportist (founded in 1909). The mid and late thirties were the club's strongest years, as it won the Bulgarian championship once, in the 1937–38 season, after being runners-up twice, in seasons 1935 and 1936. On 18 February 1945, the club was merged with Vladislav Varna, and a new club was formed on their basis – TV 45, (Note: The full name of TV 45 is Ticha-Vladislav 45.) whose descendant today is Cherno More Varna.

== Honours ==
- Bulgarian State Football Championship
  - Winners (1): 1937–38
  - Runners-up (2): 1935, 1936
