= Varna derby =

Football rivalry in Varna, Bulgaria

- Other names: Spartak Varna vs Cherno More Varna
- Location: Varna, Bulgaria
- Teams: Spartak Varna; Cherno More Varna
- First meeting: Cherno More 2–2 Spartak (18 July 1948)
- Latest meeting: Spartak 1–3 Cherno More (16 August 2025)
- Stadiums: Ticha Stadium Cherno More; Spartak Stadium Spartak Varna

Statistics
- Total meetings: 87
- Most wins: PFC Cherno More Varna
- Most player appearances: Boris Prushev (23)
- Top scorer: Dobromir Tashkov (12)
- Largest victory: Cherno More 5–0 Spartak (2008)
- Longest win streak: Cherno More (3)

The Varna derby (Bulgarian: Варненско дерби) is a football rivalry between the two most successful and popular clubs in Varna, Bulgaria: Cherno More Varna and Spartak Varna. The rivalry is one of the most heated and passionate in Bulgarian football.

== Overview ==
The matches between Cherno More and Spartak have a long history, dating back to the early 20th century. The two teams have had a number of intense encounters, especially in the Bulgarian First League. The derby is known for its passionate fanbases, with both sets of supporters having a strong following in Varna and across Bulgaria. The matches are typically high in intensity and often play a significant role in the league standings.

== Summary of results ==
As of end of season 2025–26.

	Matches	Cherno More Wins	Draws	Spartak Varna Wins	Cherno More Goals	Spartak Varna Goals
A PFG/First League	67	25	27	15	78	61
Cherno More Home	34	12	16	6	43	31
Spartak Varna Home	33	13	11	9	35	30
B PFG/Second League	6	0	3	3	4	10
Knockout and cup competitions	16	6	3	7	21	24
Local competitions	9	2	1	6	13	19
Total	98	33	34	31	116	114

Note: Matches that have finished with a win after extra time are represented as a win for the respective club.

== A PFG / First League Matches (1948–49 – present) ==
	Cherno More – Spartak Varna						Spartak Varna – Cherno More					
Season	Date	Venue	Attend.	Score	Home goals	Away goals	Date	Venue	Attend.	Score	Home goals	Away goals
1952	12–04–1952	Kolodruma	–	3-2	Yovchev 6' 35' 88'	Nenchev 25' Arnaudov 29'	20–07–1952	Kolodruma	–	0–0	–	–
1954	10–10–1954	Kolodruma	–	0-1	–	Tunchev 76' (o.g.)	16–05–1954	Kolodruma	–	1–1	Zheliabov 59'	Bogdanov 40'
1955	13–09–1955	Kolodruma	–	2-1	Filipov 21' (o.g.) Bogdanov 56'	Nenchev 47'	08–05–1955	Kolodruma	15,000	0–0	–	–
1957	26–04–1957	Kolodruma	8,000	0-3	–	Arnaudov 63' Filipov 76' Kalugerov 83'	20–10–1957	Kolodruma	15,000	0-1	–	Kirov 85'
1958	16–03–1958	Kolodruma	13,000	1-3	Kirov 20'	Traykov 16' Arnaudov 63' 79'	–	–	–	–	–	–
1958-59	07–09–1958	Gradski stadion	15,000	0-0	–	–	22–03–1959	Kolodruma	–	0-2	–	Genov 31' Kostov 44'
1960-61	25–06–1961	Gradski stadion	30,000	1-2	N. Dimitrov 19'	Stefanov 48' 59'	18–12–1960	Gradski stadion	10,000	2-0	Filipov 5' Nikolov 70'	–
1961-62	26–11–1961	Yuri Gagarin	35,000	0-0	–	–	15–07–1962	Yuri Gagarin	30,000	1-1	Filipov 83'	I. Vasilev 85'
1962-63	14–05–1963	Yuri Gagarin	–	2-1	N. Dimitrov 43' 75'	Petkov 55'	21–10–1962	Yuri Gagarin	15,000	2-0	Valchanov 25' Nikolov 66'	–
1963-64	24–05–1964	Yuri Gagarin	25,000	1-1	S. Nikolov 33'	Nikolov 82'	17–11–1963	Yuri Gagarin	–	0-2	–	I. Vasilev 75' G. Dimitrov 80'
1965-66	03–04–1966	Yuri Gagarin	30,000	2-2	Velikov 30' Bogomilov 62'	Kalugerov 34' Nikolov 81'	29–08–1965	Yuri Gagarin	30,000	1-2	Nikolov 4'	Yanev 11' Mitev 83'
1971-72	03–10–1971	Yuri Gagarin	27,000	1-1	Kalchev 61' (o.g.)	Kolev 75'	08–04–1972	Yuri Gagarin	14,000	1-2	Bonchev 55'	Mitev 47' Tahmisyan 49'
1972-73	02–09–1972	Yuri Gagarin	10,000	3-1	Mitev 7' D. Georgiev 14' E. Nedev 36' (o.g.)	S. Nedev 49'	11–03–1973	Yuri Gagarin	5,000	1-3	Fazhev 81'	Mitev 35' 70' Todorov 37'
1973-74	24–12–1973	Yuri Gagarin	10,000	2-0	Bogomilov 64' D. Georgiev 72'	–	12–08–1973	Yuri Gagarin	25,000	1-1	Minchev 51'	Bogomilov 56'
1975-76	20–03–1976	Yuri Gagarin	20,000	1-1	Kondov 76'	Dobrev 44'	06–09–1975	Yuri Gagarin	30,000	1-0	Dobrev 52'	–
1977-78	13–08–1977	Yuri Gagarin	30,000	0-0	–	–	04–03–1978	Yuri Gagarin	12,000	1-2	Tahmisyan 44'	D. Georgiev 17' Andreev 42'
1982-83	05–03–1983	Yuri Gagarin	20,000	0-0	–	–	21–08–1982	Yuri Gagarin	16,000	2-0	Naydenov 20' 27'	–
1983-84	24–08–1983	Yuri Gagarin	8,000	0-2	–	Gospodinov 35' Naydenov 72'	11–03–1984	Yuri Gagarin	7,000	2-1	Naydenov 18' 70'	Ganev 43'
1984-85	18–08–1984	Yuri Gagarin	15,000	1-0	Spasov 40'	–	03–03–1985	Yuri Gagarin	15,000	1-0	Naydenov 75'	–
1985-86	29–09–1985	Yuri Gagarin	15,000	3-0	Radev 2' Spasov 10' Marev 53'	–	26–02–1986	Yuri Gagarin	7,000	2-2	Gospodinov 10' Trendafilov 62'	Rafiev 27' 73'
1988-89	18–04–1989	Ticha	10,000	1-1	Bakardzhiev 39'	Kazakov 69'	12–10–1988	Spartak	12,000	1-1	Kazakov 33'	Vazharov 76'
1993-94	09–10–1993	Yuri Gagarin	12,000	1-2	Danev 89'	Deliyski 8' G. Gospodinov 88'	06–04–1994	Spartak	5,000	2-2	Gerdzhikov 39' Mitov 44'	Kelepov 25' Bakardzhiev 31'
2000-01	19–08–2000	Ticha	10,000	0-0	–	–	14–03–2001	Spartak	10,000	0-0	–	–
2001-02	14–10–2001	Ticha	9,000	1-1	Dionisiev 49'	Stanchev 45'	10–03–2002	Spartak	4,000	0-0	–	–
2001-02	08–05–2002	Ticha	5,000	1-1	Dobrev 88' (pen.)	Kremenliev 28' (pen.)	06–04–2002	Spartak	2,000	1-2	Krumov 50'	Gerasimov 30' Mihaylov 54' (pen.)
2002-03	15–09–2002	Ticha	12,000	2-1	Iliev 1' A. Zafirov 50'	M. Georgiev 5'	22–03–2003	Spartak	5,500	2-1	Stanchev 5' Nankov 41'	Spalević 52'
2003-04	15–08–2003	Ticha	8,000	1-1	Mirchev 90' (pen.)	A. Petrov 52' (pen.)	21–02–2004	Spartak	3,500	1-2	Z. Mihaylov 83'	Savić 27' (o.g.) Stanchev 79'
2004-05	06–05–2005	Ticha	6,000	1-0	Timnev 63' (pen.)	–	30–10–2004	Spartak	3,500	1-0	Radomirov 83'	–
2006-07	18–11–2006	Ticha	10,000	3-0	da Silva 39' Moke 54' (pen.) Zhekov 81'	–	19–05–2007	Spartak	4,500	2-0	Ortega 37' Todorov 67'	–
2007-08	10–05–2008	Ticha	6,500	0-0	–	–	1–12–2007	Spartak	5,000	0-1	–	Manolov 67'
2008-09	14–11–2008	Ticha	7,500	5-0	Manolov 51' Fernández 61' 78' Iliev 75' Kolev 81'	–	23–05–2009	Spartak	5,000	0-1	–	Kakalov 65'
2022-23	07–05–2023	Ticha	–	3-2	Panayotov 38' Dimov 51' Drobarov 74'	Ewandro 59' Balanyuk 83'	22–10–2022	Spartak	–	0-0	–	–
2024-25	08–03–2025	Ticha	–	1-1	Martín 43'	Strauß 72'	22–09–2024	Spartak	5,000	0-2	–	Soula 8' (pen.) Dudu 58'
2025-26	07–02–2026	Ticha	6,000	0-0	–	–	16–08–2025	Spartak	5,000	1-3	Xande 12'	Lazarov 2' Zlatev 39' Phellipe 89'

== B PFG / Second League Matches ==
	Cherno More – Spartak Varna						Spartak Varna – Cherno More					
Season	Date	Venue	Attend.	Score	Home goals	Away goals	Date	Venue	Attend.	Score	Home goals	Away goals
1990–91	09–03–1991	Ticha	8,000	2-2	Haralambiev 37' Radev 86'	Vazharov 35' Trendafilov 55'	22–08–1990	Spartak	10,000	1–1	Trendafilov 73'	Naydenov 80'
1991–92	18–04–1992	Ticha	8,000	0-0	–	–	12–10–1991	Spartak	6,000	3–0	Hmelnitzki 14' 44' Kazakov 80'	–
1994–95	06–05–1995	Ticha	10,000	0–2	–	Stanchev 40' Trendafilov 67'	29–10–1994	Spartak	8,000	2–1	Trendafilov 40' Kazakov 44'	Timnev 35'

== Knockout and cup competitions ==
Competition	Season	Round	Date	Stadium	Attendance	Match		Result	Goalscorers
Red Army Cup	1946	Preliminary	28 Oct 1945	Kolodruma	–	Ticha–Vladislav	Spartak	4–0	Mokanov, own goal, n/a, n/a
Red Army Cup	1947	Preliminary	31 Oct 1946	Kolodruma	3,500	Spartak	Ticha–Vladislav	5–1	Tashkov, Parushev, Ruhov; Konakov
Red Army Cup	1948	Preliminary	19 Oct 1947	Kolodruma	–	Spartak	TVP	1–0	n/a
Republican Championship	1948	Quarterfinal	18 Jul 1948	Kolodruma	8,000	TVP	Spartak	2–2	Konakov 66', Ganchev 83'; Tashkov 45', Parushev 53'
Republican Championship	1948	Quarterfinal	25 Jul 1948	Kolodruma	10,000	Spartak	TVP	4–0	Parushev 30' 46', Tashkov 50' 81'
Soviet Army Cup	1952	Round of 16	19 Oct 1952	Kolodruma	–	Spartak	VMS	1–1	n/a
Soviet Army Cup	1952	Round of 16	20 Oct 1952	Kolodruma	–	Spartak	VMS	2–2	n/a
Soviet Army Cup	1952	Round of 16	23 Oct 1952	Kolodruma	–	Spartak	VMS	0–1 (a.e.t.)	G. Dimitrov 102'
Soviet Army Cup	1955	First round	16 Oct 1955	Kolodruma	–	VMS	Spartak	2–1	Dosev 37', Kovachev 71'; Arnaudov 62'
Soviet Army Cup	1969-70	Round of 32	06 Dec 1969	Gagarin	–	Spartak	Cherno More	1–2	Kolev 11'; Bogomilov 20' 22'
Soviet Army Cup	1972-73	Round of 32	20 Dec 1972	Gagarin	–	Spartak	Cherno More	1–0	Nedev 41'
Bulgarian Cup (Note: Secondary cup tournament until 1982)	1980-81	33rd-64th Place	27 Dec 1980	Ticha	6,200	Cherno More	Spartak	2–1	Ganev 10', Rafiev 84'; Petrov 63'
Bulgarian Cup	1980-81	33rd-64th Place	11 Feb 1981	Spartak	10,000	Spartak	Cherno More	2–1 (4−5 p)	Stoev 56', Voychev 65'; B. Kolev 30'
Soviet Army Cup (Note: Secondary cup tournament 1982-1990)	1983-84	Round of 32	25 Dec 1983	Gagarin	5,000	Spartak	Cherno More	1–0	Naydenov 23'
Bulgarian Cup	1984-85	Second Round	11 Nov 1984	Gagarin	2,500	Cherno More	Spartak	1–2	Hamidov 36'; Lichev 38', Naydenov 40'
Bulgarian Cup	1984-85	Second Round	18 Nov 1984	Gagarin	3,000	Spartak	Cherno More	0–2	N. Spasov 9', T. Atanasov 25'

== Local Competitions ==
Competition	Season	Date	Stadium	Attendance	Match		Result	Goalscorers
Varna Championship	1945	27 May 1945	Kolodruma	–	Ticha–Vladislav	Spartak	2–1	H. Konakov 5' 43'; Parushev 42'
Varna Championship	1945	8 Jul 1945	Kolodruma	–	Spartak	Ticha–Vladislav	2–1	Manolov 18', Yovchev 28'; Nedev 11'
Varna Championship	1946	12 May 1946	Kolodruma	8,000	Ticha–Vladislav	Spartak	2–2	n/a 4', n/a; Yovchev 15', Karpuschiev
Varna Championship	1946	15 Jun 1946	Kolodruma	–	Spartak	Ticha–Vladislav	2–1	Tashkov 8' 88'; Kasabov 11'
Varna Championship	1947	20 Apr 1947	Kolodruma	10,000	Spartak	TVP	3–1	Zahariev 8', Tashkov 41' 88'; A. Konakov 13'
Varna Championship	1947	21 Jun 1947	Kolodruma	–	TVP	Spartak	1–2	n/a
Oblast (Note: Round-robin between the first two teams in Varna Championship and the winners of the local Shumen, Targovishte and Dobrich championships) Championship	1947	02 Aug 1947	Kolodruma	4,000	TVP	Spartak	1–3	Nedev 3'; Zahariev 15' 75' (pen.), Ruhov 79'
Oblast (Note: Round-robin between two Varna teams and six other northeastern clubs) Championship	1947–48	14 Mar 1948	Kolodruma	4,500	TVP	Spartak	3–2	Ganchev 1' 88', Nedev 21'; Parushev 9', Zahariev 35'
Oblast Championship	1947–48	30 May 1948	Kolodruma	6,000	Spartak	TVP	2–1	Yovchev 28', Zahariev 55'; Terzistoev 58'

== Head-to-head ranking in First League (1948–2025) ==
P.	49	50	51	52	53	54	55	56	57	58	59	60	61	62	63	64	65	66	67	68	69	70	71	72	73	74	75	76	77	78	79	80	81	82	83	84	85	86	87	88	89	90	91	92	93	94	95	96	97	98	99	00	01	02	03	04	05	06	07	08	09	10	11	12	13	14	15	16	17	18	19	20	21	22	23	24	25	26
1																																																																														
2																																																																												2		
3					3		3																													3																									3																3	
4																					4													4																																												
5		5	5																																																				5					5											5			5				
6	6													6		6			6														6															6								6			6				6			6		6	6						6			
7				7		7							7									7	7									7			7						7									7		7	7		7							7		7						7		7	7				7	7
8										8					8		8							8														8																			8	8									8											
9									9		9															9				9					9														9					9																								
10						10		10	10			10													10						10						10		10	10													10												10													
11														11				11		11								11																										11						11																		
12				12			12			12	12		12																																12						12																											12
13																																				13																				13			13																			
14															14												14		14								14									14																																
15																15		15						15	15			15		15								15			15	15				15															15																	
16																										16																															16																		16			
17																																																																														
18																																																																														
B			3					2				3																	1										8	1		4	5	2	1		1	6	8	10	7	1						1				9		7	7	8	16					15		3		1		
B																																											8	11			7																															

- Total: Cherno More with 53 higher finishes, Spartak Varna with 25 higher finishes (as of the end of the 2025–26 season).

== Interesting Facts ==
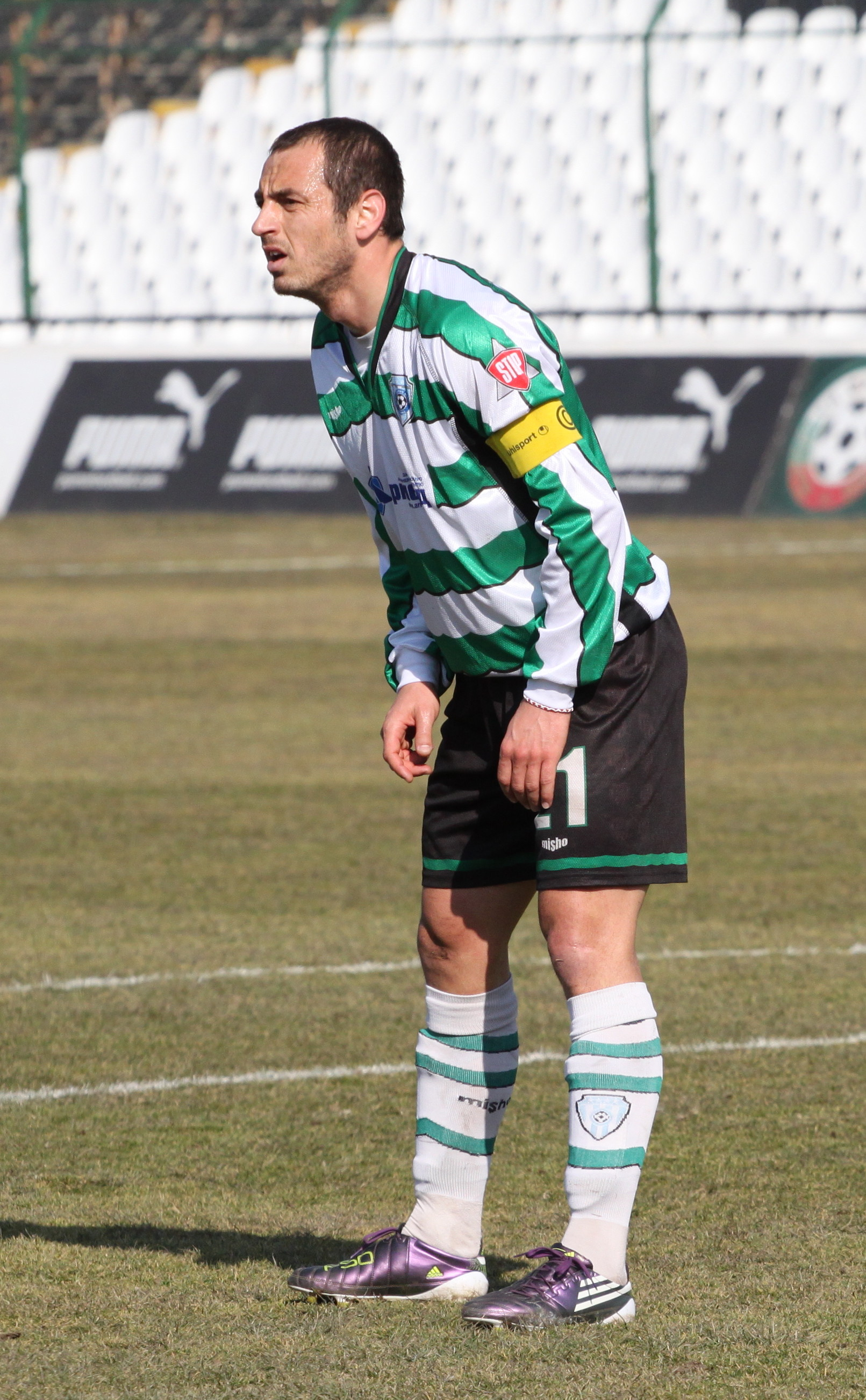
Georgi Iliev scored the fastest goal in the history of the derby.

- The players with the most appearances in the Varna derby in the A Group are Todor Marev from Cherno More and Iliya Kirchev from Spartak, each with 18 matches.
- The players with the most appearances in all official matches of the derby (city, regional, and national championships, A and B Group, national cup, and the Soviet Army Cup) are Boris Parushev – "Borleto" from Spartak with 23 matches, and Todor Marev from Cherno More with 22 matches.
- The top goalscorer in the A Group matches of the derby is Stefan Naydenov from Spartak with 6 goals. Zdravko Mitev holds the record for Cherno More with 5 goals.
- The top goalscorer in all official matches of the Varna derby is Dobromir Tashkov from Spartak with 12 goals. Zdravko Mitev and Stefan Bogomilov hold the record for Cherno More with 5 goals each.
- The first and only hat-trick in the A Group derby was scored by Dimitar Yovchev from Cherno More, securing a 3:2 victory in 1952. A hat-trick was also scored by Dobromir Tashkov from Spartak in the Soviet Army Cup in 1946 (which at the time served as a national cup), when Spartak won 5:1. The other goals were scored by Boris Parushev and Spiridon Rukhov, while Anastaz Konakov scored the only goal for Cherno More.
- The biggest margin of victory was recorded on November 14, 2008, when "The Sailors" (Cherno More) defeated "The Falcons" (Spartak) 5:0 at Ticha Stadium in an A Group match.
- The largest victory margin for Spartak in the derby was on October 31, 1946, with a 5:1 win in a preliminary round of the national cup at "Kolodruma" stadium, and on July 25, 1948, in a quarterfinal second-leg match of the national championship with a 4:0 win, also at "Kolodruma" stadium.
- The longest winning streak in the derby belongs to Spartak, with five consecutive victories: 2:1 (June 15, 1946, city championship), 5:1 (October 31, 1946, national cup), 3:1 (April 20, 1947, city championship), 2:1 (June 21, 1947, city championship), and 3:1 (August 2, 1947, regional championship). All matches were played at "Kolodruma" stadium.
- The first foreign player to participate in the Varna derby at the A Group level was Albanian midfielder Mehmet Kurda. During the 1993/94 season, he played for Cherno More.
- The first foreign player to score in the Varna derby was Ukrainian Volodymyr Khmelnytsky. During the 1991/92 season, he scored two goals for Spartak in a 3:0 victory in the B Group.
- The first foreign player to score in the Varna derby at the A Group level was Russian Vladimir Gerasimov. On April 6, 2002, he scored in a 2:1 victory for Cherno More at Spartak Stadium.
- Hristo Valchanov from Spartak is the only goalkeeper to have scored in the derby. He converted a penalty in 1962, helping "The Falcons" secure a 2:0 victory.
- Georgi Iliev holds the record for the fastest goal in the history of the Varna derby. On September 15, 2002, he scored in the 1st minute, leading Cherno More to a 2:1 victory.

== See also ==
- Football in Bulgaria
- PFC Cherno More Varna
- PFC Spartak Varna
