= Railroaders derby =

Bulgarian football

- Other names: Lokomotiv Plovdiv vs Lokomotiv Sofia
- Teams: Lokomotiv Sofia; Lokomotiv Plovdiv
- First meeting: Lokomotiv Sofia 1–0 Lokomotiv Plovdiv (16 April 1950; 76 years ago) friendly match
- Latest meeting: 24 October 2024, Lokomotiv Sofia 2-2 Lokomotiv Plovdiv
- Next meeting: 4th April TBD
- Stadiums: Stadion Lokomotiv (Plovdiv) Lokomotiv Plovdiv; Stadion Lokomotiv (Sofia) Lokomotiv Sofia

Statistics
- Total meetings: 102 excluding friendly matches
- Most wins: Lokomotiv Sofia (45)
- All-time series: Lokomotiv Sofia: 45; Drawn: 26; Lokomotiv Plovdiv: 31
- Largest victory: Lokomotiv Sofia 5–1 Lokomotiv Plovdiv (1954); Lokomotiv Plovdiv 5–1 Lokomotiv Sofia (1972)

The Railroaders derby (Bulgarian: дерби на железничарите) is the name of the football match between PFC Lokomotiv Sofia and PFC Lokomotiv Plovdiv. The two teams are the most popular football teams in Bulgaria associated with the railroad industry, representing Sofia and Plovdiv, respectively. Overall, Lokomotiv Sofia has been more successful, winning 44 games, compared to Lokomotiv Plovdiv's 31 wins. Lokomotiv Sofia also has won more trophies in total.

== History ==
The cities of Sofia and Plovdiv have traditionally been the biggest and most developed in Bulgaria, including sports wise. Lokomotiv Plovdiv were founded in 1926, fourteen years after their rivals, Botev Plovdiv. This derby has always been seen as the traditional rivalry for Lokomotiv Plovdiv, as the two teams are the strongest from Plovdiv. Lokomotiv Sofia, on the other hand, was founded in 1929. Prior to the creation of A PFG in 1948, Lokomotiv Sofia was among the most prominent Bulgarian teams, winning two national titles.

Following the arrival of the communist regime in Bulgaria in 1948, all sports clubs became state-owned. This was based on the system used in the Soviet Union, as well as other communist states in Eastern Europe. Like in the USSR, sports clubs’ names were changed to emphasize the new political regime. Lokomotiv Sofia was originally known as “Railroaders football club”, but was forced to change its name to the present one, “Lokomotiv”. Lokomotiv Plovdiv followed a similar naming history.

The first meeting between the two Lokomotiv teams came on April 16, 1950. The match was a friendly game, and Lokomotiv Sofia won 1–0. Since then, the two teams have almost always regularly played each other in the top tier of Bulgarian football, with brief relegations for both sides. The first of these relegations came in 1955, when Lokomotiv Plovdiv slipped into the second tier. Plovdiv did not return to the elite until 1962. During this period, Lokomotiv Sofia had established themselves as a strong contender for the title, finishing second in 1957 and third in 1960. When Lokomotiv Plovdiv returned in 1962, they were in the shadow of their Sofia-based rivals. Lokomotiv Sofia won the national title in 1963-64 season, claiming their third title overall, while Lokomotiv Plovdiv only finished eighth.

Starting from 1969, however, Lokomotiv Plovdiv became more successful, finishing in the top six between 1969 and 1976. On the other hand, Lokomotiv Sofia only displayed mediocre results. This even included a relegation in the 1968–69 season for Loko Sofia. They returned to the elite in 1972. Things changed, however, when Lokomotiv Sofia won their fourth national title in the 1977-78 season, surprising many. For Lokomotiv Plovdiv, however, dark times came. They were relegated for the second time in 1980, finishing second to last. The derby was not played in the following three seasons, until 1983, when Loko Plovdiv returned to the elite. This only lasted one season, as Lokomotiv Plovdiv were again relegated, finishing 15th once more. This time they returned after only one season in B PFG.

The following years saw mixed performances from both teams, although neither was relegated. After 1989, the communist regime was overthrown, which resulted in the privatization of the economy, including football clubs. In 1992, Lokomotiv Plovdiv finished third, their highest placement since 1974. Two years later, Lokomotiv Sofia managed to finish second, which started a relatively successful decade for the Sofia club. On the other hand, Lokomotiv Plovdiv, began a downward spiral in terms of results, finishing behind their rivals in the following years. This ultimately resulted in relegation in 1999, a result of bad management in the club. Following this, the owners of Lokomotiv Plovdiv decided to save the club by merging with Belasitsa Petrich, but keeping their name. The new owners began investing heavily, and Lokomotiv Plovdiv returned to the first tier in 2002. The 2003-04 season was historic for Lokomotiv Plovdiv, as they won their first ever national title, while Lokomotiv Sofia only finished 9th. After winning their title however, Lokomotiv Plovdiv began declining again, even finishing in the bottom half of the table, while Lokomotiv Sofia began stabilizing and often finished in the top 5 of the league, qualifying for the UEFA Cup frequently.

The early 2010s were not memorable for either of the two clubs, with Lokomotiv Sofia barely avoiding relegation during the 2011-12 and 2012-13 seasons. During the 2014-15 season, Lokomotiv Sofia finished third, but was administratively relegated to the third tier for financial problems, which was the result of several years of bad management in the club. Lokomotiv Plovdiv barely avoided relegation that same season. The spring game in 2015 remained the last competitive game between the two sides until 2021, when Lokomotiv Sofia finally managed to return to the First League after six years of absence. During this period, Lokomotiv Plovdiv experienced one of its best periods in history, winning the Bulgarian Cup two times in a row, in 2019 and 2020, under the successful management of Bruno Akrapović

== Official match statistics ==
As of 20 February 2026

	Games played	Lokomotiv Sofia wins	Draws	Lokomotiv Plovdiv wins	Lokomotiv Sofia goals	Lokomotiv Plovdiv goals
Parva Liga	102	45	26	31	145	113

== Head-to-head ranking in First League (1948–2022) ==
P.	49	50	51	52	53	54	55	56	57	58	59	60	61	62	63	64	65	66	67	68	69	70	71	72	73	74	75	76	77	78	79	80	81	82	83	84	85	86	87	88	89	90	91	92	93	94	95	96	97	98	99	00	01	02	03	04	05	06	07	08	09	10	11	12	13	14	15	16	17	18	19	20	21	22
1																1														1																										1																		
2									2								2								2																						2																										2	
3	3			3		3						3								3	3					3					3													3				3									3		3	3							3							
4					4					4					4								4					4							4		4		4				4		4						4			4				4				4	4											
5											5							5				5		5		5								5						5		5			5	5												5			5		5					5	5			5		
6				6		6							6				6										6									6			6																6		6				6			6										
7	7	7	7		7		7	7						7	7										7		7		7									7		7							7		7										7							7								
8																8		8	8									8	8												8			8									8	8																8				
9		9																		9													9					9												9		9				9				9					9									9
10																								10																									10						10											10	10				10			
11																			11											11		11											11			11		11																										11
12														12																																																12			12									
13							13																																			13								13														13										
14																															14										14																																	
15																																15				15															15																							
16																					16																																																					
17																																																																										
18																																																																										

• Total: Lokomotiv Plovdiv with 22 higher finishes, Lokomotiv Sofia with 33 higher finishes (as of the end of the 2021–22 season).

== Trophies ==
National Competition	Lokomotiv Sofia	Lokomotiv Plovdiv
Bulgarian Championship	4	1
Bulgarian Cup	4	2
Bulgarian Supercup	0	2
Soviet Army Cup	0	1
Balkans Cup	1	0
Total	9	6

Notes:

- Bulgarian Cup section includes Soviet Army Cup as major Cup tournament.
- Soviet Army Cup section includes the period after 1982 as secondary Cup tournament.
- Italics indicates defunct tournaments.

== Statistics ==
=== Biggest wins ===
==== Lokomotiv Plovdiv wins ====
5:1 - 1972/17/12
4:0 - 1953/22/09

==== Lokomotiv Sofia wins ====
5:1 - 1954
4:0 - 1996/06/04
4:0 - 2014/12/12
