= Battle for Thrace =

Football rivalry in Bulgaria

- Other names: Thracian derby Botev Plovdiv vs Beroe Stara Zagora
- Teams: PFC Botev Plovdiv; PFC Beroe Stara Zagora
- First meeting: Beroe 3–2 Botev (1958; 68 years ago)
- Latest meeting: 14 May 2025, Beroe 0–6 Botev
- Next meeting: 16 August 2025, Beroe – Botev
- Stadiums: Hristo Botev Stadium Botev; Botev 1912 Football Complex Botev; Beroe Stadium Beroe

Statistics
- Total meetings: 117
- Most wins: Botev (46)
- All-time series: Botev: 46; Drawn: 32; Beroe: 39
- Largest victory: Botev 8-1 Beroe (22 December 1986)

Battle for Thrace or Thracian derby (Bulgarian: Битката за Тракия) is the name of the local derby football match between PFC Botev Plovdiv and PFC Beroe Stara Zagora.

== Parva Liga match statistics ==
As of 14 May 2025

	Games played	Botev wins	Draws	Beroe wins	Botev goals	Beroe goals
Botev in Parva Liga at home	58	34	15	9	112	49
Beroe in Parva Liga at home	59	12	17	30	76	99
Parva Liga	117	46	32	39	188	148
Cup	7	4	1	2	10	7
Overall	124	53	33	41	198	155

=== Head-to-head ranking in First League (1948–2025) ===
P.	49	50	51	52	53	54	55	56	57	58	59	60	61	62	63	64	65	66	67	68	69	70	71	72	73	74	75	76	77	78	79	80	81	82	83	84	85	86	87	88	89	90	91	92	93	94	95	96	97	98	99	00	01	02	03	04	05	06	07	08	09	10	11	12	13	14	15	16	17	18	19	20	21	22	23	24	25	26
1																			1																			1																																								
2															2																							2																													2											
3								3					3											3									3		3		3		3	3					3	3	3																					3						3				
4														4								4								4		4				4					4			4																					4	4				4	4							
5																	5						5									5									5		5						5																					5								
6																		6		6	6			6				6		6										6																											6				6	6	6				6	
7												7				7															7			7								7		7		7																	7		7			7	7			7		7				
8									8		8																				8																					8														8			8								8	
9				9						9				9											9				9							9							9																																	9		
10			10				10			10			10					10	10	10						10	10	10					10									10			10			10									10	10	10			10		10									10		10			
11					11						11																		11																					11									11																	11		
12															12		12				12																12																12		12					12																		
13																									13														13												13	13	13					13			13																	
14						14										14																																						14		14				14															14			
15																										15								15																																												
16																						16																									16															16																
17																																																																														
18																																																																														

- Total: Beroe with 19 higher finishes, Botev Plovdiv with 35 higher finishes (as of the end of the 2024–25 season).

== Trophies ==
National Competition	Botev Plovdiv	Beroe Stara Zagora
Bulgarian Championship	2	1
Bulgarian Cup	4	2
Bulgarian Supercup	1	1
Balkans Cup	1	4
Total	8	8

Botev Plovdiv and Beroe Stara Zagora are the only Bulgarian clubs, which managed to win at least once all major Bulgarian club tournaments (Bulgarian Championship, Bulgarian Cup, Bulgarian Supercup) and Balkans Cup

== Statistics ==
=== Biggest wins ===
==== Botev wins ====
8:1 - 22 December 1986
6:0 - 17 November 1968
6:0 - 14 May 2025
4:1 - 1 December 2018
4:1 - 12 December 1984

==== Beroe wins ====
5:2 - 7 August 1999
3:0 - 21 September 1986
3:0 - 26 April 2010
