= Little capital derby =

- Other names: Little Sofia derby
- Location: Sofia, Bulgaria
- Teams: Slavia Sofia; Lokomotiv Sofia
- First meeting: Lokomotiv 2–0 Slavia (20 November 1948); Friendly match
- Latest meeting: Lokomotiv 3-2 Slavia (6 April 2025); First League
- Stadiums: Stadion Vasil Levski used by both clubs Stadion Aleksandar Shalamanov; Slavia; Stadion Lokomotiv; Lokomotiv

Statistics
- Total meetings: 126 excluding friendly matches
- Most wins: Slavia Sofia (51)
- All-time series: Slavia: 51; Drawn: 32; Lokomotiv: 43
- Largest victory: Lokomotiv 6–0 Slavia (27 May 2000)

The Little capital derby or the Little Sofia derby (Bulgarian: Малко софийско дерби) is the name of the football match between Slavia Sofia and Lokomotiv Sofia. Slavia and Lokomotiv are the two most popular and successful football clubs in Sofia after Levski and CSKA, the match between whom is considered the biggest derby in Bulgaria and the "big" capital derby.

== Official match statistics ==
As of 23 November 2019

	Games played	Slavia wins	Draws	Lokomotiv wins	Slavia goals	Lokomotiv goals
Parva Liga	134	55	33	46	193	179

=== Head-to-head ranking in First League (1948–2022) ===
P.	49	50	51	52	53	54	55	56	57	58	59	60	61	62	63	64	65	66	67	68	69	70	71	72	73	74	75	76	77	78	79	80	81	82	83	84	85	86	87	88	89	90	91	92	93	94	95	96	97	98	99	00	01	02	03	04	05	06	07	08	09	10	11	12	13	14	15	16	17	18	19	20	21	22
1																1														1																		1																										
2		2				2	2		2		2						2		2													2										2					2																											
3	3			3		3						3				3	3	3		3		3			3		3				3			3				3					3					3	3										3	3							3					3		
4	4							4		4		4			4									4					4		4				4		4		4	4			4				4				4				4			4				4	4					4						
5					5					5	5			5						5	5			5		5		5		5				5					5	5		5			5					5				5		5	5		5		5													
6									6				6										6													6																6	6				6					6												6
7					7		7	7						7											7		7		7				7				7												7		7							7		7														
8				8														8	8							8		8													8			8									8	8										8	8						8			
9		9																															9					9								9				9		9				9					9					9	9			9				
10															10																													10											10											10								
11													11																			11									11					11																	11						11				11	11
12																																			12																														12									
13																																																																13										
14																																				14									14																													
15																																																																										
16																					16																																																					
17																																																																										
18																																																																										

• Total: Slavia Sofia with 38 higher finishes, Lokomotiv Sofia with 29 higher finishes (as of the end of the 2021–22 season).

== Trophies ==
National Competition	Slavia Sofia	Lokomotiv Sofia
A PFG / First League	7	4
Bulgarian Cup	8	4
Bulgarian Supercup	0	0
Balkans Cup	2	1
Total	17	9

Notes:

- Bulgarian Cup section includes Soviet Army Cup as major Cup tournament.
- Italics indicates defunct tournaments.

== Statistics ==
=== Biggest wins ===
==== Slavia wins ====
5:0 - 1953/22/09
5:1 - 1979/23/09

==== Lokomotiv wins ====
6:0 - 2000/27/05
5:1 - 1972/11/12
