= Oldest capital derby =

- Other names: Oldest Sofia derby
- Location: Sofia, Bulgaria
- Teams: Slavia Sofia; Levski Sofia
- First meeting: Slavia 1–0 Levski (15 April 1915); Friendly match
- Latest meeting: Levski 2–0 Slavia (03 August 2025); First League
- Next meeting: TBD
- Stadiums: Stadion Vasil Levski used by both clubs Stadion Aleksandar Shalamanov; Slavia; Stadion Georgi Asparuhov; Levski

Statistics
- Total meetings: 231 excluding friendly matches
- Most wins: Levski Sofia (110)
- All-time series: Slavia: 62; Drawn: 60; Levski: 110
- Largest victory: Levski 5–0 Slavia (1941/1942; 28 October 2005)

Oldest capital derby or Oldest Sofia derby (Bulgarian: Най-старото столично дерби) is the name of the football match between the oldest still existing teams in the capital of Bulgaria: Slavia Sofia and Levski Sofia. Matches between the two sides have been played almost continuously ever since a football league in Bulgaria has existed. The two teams regularly competed for the title before World War II. Levski have never been relegated from the top flight, while Slavia have missed only one season, for political reasons. This is the most frequently played match in Bulgarian football.

== History ==
Established in 1913 and 1914, respectively, Slavia and Levski are the two oldest, still-existing football teams from Sofia. Both teams won the Bulgarian Republican Championship several times prior to the Second World War. Slavia managed to win six national titles before 1945, while Levski won three national titles, and one Bulgarian Cup.

The two teams are also among the most successful when it comes to the Bulgarian Cup. Levski has won a record 26, while Slavia has won 8. They have also played against each other twice in the finals of the competition. The first final between them occurred in 1996. The match did not even finish, with Slavia being awarded a walkover in their favor, due to Levski deciding to abandon the game in the 75th minute. 22 years later, the two sides again met in the final, in 2018. The game ended in a goalless draw, after which Slavia won on penalties, thus winning their eight title overall. In 2021, the two rivals met again in the quarter-finals of the tournament, with Slavia winning once again by the score of 2–1. However, Levski is the dominant force in this rivalry, historically.

== Official match statistics ==
As of 03 August 2025

	Games played	Slavia wins	Draws	Levski wins	Slavia goals	Levski goals
First League	158	31	47	80	154	268
Bulgarian Cup	17	7	4	6	26	19
Stolichno Parvenstvo (Capital Championship)	42	18	8	16	68	72
Natsionalna Diviziya (National Division)	6	3	0	3	8	10
Darzhavno parvenstvo (State championship)	4	2	0	2	5	5
Other cups (Ulpia Serdica Cup and Soviet Army Cup)	4	0	1	3	4	7
Total	231	61	60	110	265	381

=== Head-to-head ranking in First League (1948–2023) ===
P.	49	50	51	52	53	54	55	56	57	58	59	60	61	62	63	64	65	66	67	68	69	70	71	72	73	74	75	76	77	78	79	80	81	82	83	84	85	86	87	88	89	90	91	92	93	94	95	96	97	98	99	00	01	02	03	04	05	06	07	08	09	10	11	12	13	14	15	16	17	18	19	20	21	22	23
1	1	1			1												1			1		1				1			1		1					1	1			1					1	1	1	1				1	1	1				1	1		1														
2		2				2	2	2		2	2	2	2			2		2	2		2		2	2			2	2				2	2	2	2				2		2	2		2				2		2	2				2	2	2			2			2		2			2							
3			3						3		3			3		3	3	3	3			3			3		3			3		3		3				3					3						3													3		3					3	3	3	3			
4	4							4				4												4	4				4		4									4		4					4		4						4													4				4		4	4
5				5	5	5	5			5				5						5	5							5		5								5	5											5				5		5	5		5							5									
6									6						6								6																				6									6	6									6												6	
7																																	7				7														7							7		7							7								
8				8																						8																																						8	8						8		8		8
9																																														9															9					9	9			9					
10															10																													10																															
11													11																												11																						11						11				11		
12																																			12																																								
13																																																																											
14																																				14									14																														
15																																																																											
16																																																																											
17																																																																											
18																																																																											

• Total: Slavia Sofia with 12 higher finishes, Levski Sofia with 62 higher finishes (as of the end of the 2022–23 season).

== Trophies ==
National Competition	Slavia Sofia	Levski Sofia
A PFG / First League	7	27
Bulgarian Cup	8	27
Bulgarian Supercup	0	3
Soviet Army Cup	0	3
People's Republic of Bulgaria Cup	0	1
Total	15	61

Notes:

- Bulgarian Cup section includes Soviet Army Cup as major Cup tournament.
- Soviet Army Cup section includes the period after 1982 as secondary Cup tournament.
- People's Republic of Bulgaria Cup section includes the period before 1982 as secondary Cup tournament.
- Italics indicates defunct tournaments.

== Statistics ==
=== Biggest wins ===
==== Slavia wins ====
4–1 - 1925/1926; 1931/1932; 26 October 1958; 24 March 1990

==== Levski wins ====
5–0 - 1941/1942; 28 October 2005

Notes:

- Slavia walkover win with 4:0 in 1996 Bulgarian Cup Final is not included.
