= Plovdiv derby =

Bulgarian football derby

- Other names: Botev Plovdiv vs Lokomotiv Plovdiv
- Location: Plovdiv, Bulgaria
- Teams: Botev Plovdiv; Lokomotiv Plovdiv
- First meeting: Lokomotiv 3–0 Botev (1 April 1951; 75 years ago)
- Latest meeting: Botev 2–0 Lokomotiv (13 September 2026)
- Next meeting: Lokomotiv - Botev (13 April 2027)
- Stadiums: Plovdiv Stadium used by both clubs Hristo Botev Stadium Botev; Botev 1912 Football Complex Botev; Lokomotiv Stadium Lokomotiv

Statistics
- Total meetings: 135
- Most wins: Botev (49)
- Most player appearances: Dinko Dermendzhiev; Vidin Apostolov (28)
- Top scorer: Georgi Vasilev (13)
- Largest victory: Lokomotiv 6-0 Botev (28 November 2020)
- Longest win streak: Lokomotiv Plovdiv (4)

The Plovdiv derby (Bulgarian: Пловдивско дерби) is the derby in Bulgarian football between Botev Plovdiv and Lokomotiv Plovdiv. It is named after the city, where both clubs are located. The Plovdiv derby is considered to be the second fiercest rivalry in Bulgarian football, after the Eternal derby of Bulgarian football. The first match between Botev and Lokomotiv was held on 1 April 1951. Since then, it has been played almost regularly twice per season. Overall, Botev have more wins, having won 49 games, Lokomotiv have won 46, and 38 games ended in a draw.

== Overview ==
Plovdiv derby is the name given to a football match played between two Plovdiv clubs. Although the name is mostly used to describe the match between the city's two most successful clubs, Botev and Lokomotiv, there is another derby match known as The small Plovdiv derby, contested between Spartak and Maritsa.

== League matches (1948–49 – present) ==
	Botev – Lokomotiv				Lokomotiv – Botev			
Season	Date	Venue	Score	Atten.	Date	Venue	Score	Attend.
1951	30–06–1951		2–1		01–04–1951		3–0	
1952	25–05–1952		0–1		08–08–1952		2–1	
1953	12–04–1953		0–1		11–09–1953		2–0	
1955	20–03–1955		3–0		21–08–1955		0–1	
1961–62	15–07–1962		0–1		26–11–1961		1–2	
1962–63	22–12–1962		0–0		07–07–1963		0–4	
1963–64	12–04–1964		3–2		22–09–1963		1–0	
1964–65	29–08–1964		0–2		28–03–1965		0–0	
1965–66	18–08–1965		0–3		03–04–1966		0–1	
1966–67	28–08–1966		1–1		04–03–1967		0–1	
1967–68	13–08–1967		1–0		03–03–1968		1–2	
1968–69	18–08–1968		1–1		16–03–1969		0–0	
1969–70	07–03–1970		0–1		10–08–1969		1–3	
1970–71	08–05–1971		1–4		01–11–1970		2–3	
1971–72	17–05–1972		0–2		17–10–1971		2–2	
1972–73	19–08–1972		3–4		25–02–1973		0–1	
1973–74	18–04–1974		0–1		02–09–1973		2–1	
1974–75	30–03–1975		0–1		08–09–1974		7–3	
1975–76	16–08–1975		2–2		06–03–1976		0–0	
1976–77	30–03–1977		0–2		28–08–1976		1–2	
1977–78	27–08–1977		1–0		18–03–1978		0–1	
1978–79	02–09–1978		1–0		03–03–1979		4–0	
1979–80	01–09–1979		1–0		22–03–1980		0–0	
1983–84	21–08–1983		4–2		08–03–1984		1–2	
1985–86	21–08–1985		2–2		14–12–1985		1–1	
1986–87	08–03–1987		2–2		30–08–1986		1–2	
1987–88	05–03–1988		0–0		22–08–1987		2–5	
1988–89	27–08–1988		5–0		11–03–1989		1–0	
1989–90	02–09–1989		0–0		17–03–1990		0–2	
1990–91	02–03–1991		2–2		18–08–1990		1–1	
1991–92	18–04–1992		1–1		12–10–1991		1–0	
1992–93	03–10–1992		1–1		25–04–1993		1–2	
1993–94	19–09–1993		1–2		20–03–1994		1–3	
1994–95	11–09–1994		1–0		17–03–1995		1–0	
1995–96	02–09–1995		5–0		09–03–1996		0–0	
1996–97	17–08–1996		0–1		02–03–1997		2–0	
1997–98	09–08–1997		1–0		28–02–1998		1–0	
1998–99	07–11–1998		0–0		05–05–1999		2–1	
2002–03	25–05–2003	Hristo Botev Stadium	1–2	12,000	10–11–2002	Lokomotiv Stadium	5–3	
2003–04	05–03–2004	Hristo Botev Stadium	0–0	9,000	29–08–2003	Lokomotiv Stadium	3–2	12,000
2005–06	05–11–2005	Hristo Botev Stadium	1–1	15,000	16–05–2006	Lokomotiv Stadium	0–0	8,000
2006–07	26–08–2006	Hristo Botev Stadium	3–2	9,000	24–03–2007	Lokomotiv Stadium	2–0	11,500
2007–08	05–04–2008	Hristo Botev Stadium	1–2	13,000	29–09–2007	Lokomotiv Stadium	4–0	8,500
2008–09	29–11–2008	Hristo Botev Stadium	2–2	8,540	13–06–2009	Lokomotiv Stadium	3–0	
2009–10	31–10–2009	Hristo Botev Stadium	1–0	6,500	22–04–2010	not played	3–0	
2012–13	08–05–2013	Hristo Botev Stadium	0–0	13,300	04–11–2012	Lokomotiv Stadium	2–2	8,790
2013–14	14–09–2013	Hristo Botev Stadium	2–0	12,200	08–12–2013	Lokomotiv Stadium	0–0	5,710
2013–14	16–03–2014	Vasil Levski National Stadium, Sofia	2–1	3,480	19–04–2014	Lokomotiv Stadium	0–3	3,070
2014–15	27–09–2014	Botev 1912 Football Complex	2–0	3,400	10–03–2015	Lokomotiv Stadium	0–2	5,580
2015–16	01–08–2015	Botev 1912 Football Complex	1–1	3,100	17–10–2015	Lokomotiv Stadium	2–1	5,350
2015–16	20–02–2016	Botev 1912 Football Complex	1–0	3,600	24–04–2016	Lokomotiv Stadium	2–1	6,670
2016–17	30–07–2016	Lazur Stadium, Burgas	1–1	7,250	20–11–2016	Lokomotiv Stadium	2–0	4,580
2017–18	24–09–2017	Botev 1912 Football Complex	3–0	0	04–03–2018	Lokomotiv Stadium	0–0	3,600
2018–19	17–08–2018	Botev 1912 Football Complex	0–1	3,100	04–12–2018	Lokomotiv Stadium	0–2	3,600
2019–20	15–02–2020	Botev 1912 Football Complex	0–0	3,200	31–08–2019	Lokomotiv Stadium	1–1	6,200
2020–21	09–08–2020	Botev 1912 Football Complex	2–0	2,000	27–11–2020	Lokomotiv Stadium	6–0	0
2021–22	05–03–2022	Botev 1912 Football Complex	2–1	3,500	25–09–2021	Lokomotiv Stadium	1–1	5,000
2022–23	11–03–2023	Botev 1912 Football Complex	1–1		03–09–2022	Lokomotiv Stadium	1–0	6,000
2023–24	03–11–2023	Hristo Botev Stadium	0–0		16–07–2023	Lokomotiv Stadium	1–1	4,000
2024–25	28–07–2024	Hristo Botev Stadium	2–2	12,473	01−12−2024	Lokomotiv Stadium	0–1	

== Bulgarian Cup and other ==
Season	Date	Match	Stadium	Attendance	Competition
1965–66	30 June 1966	Lokomotiv 3−3 (a.e.t.), (4−3 p) Botev			Bulgarian Cup Round of 16
1982–83	1982	Botev 3−1 Lokomotiv			Bulgarian Cup Round of 32 – 1st leg
1982–83	1982	Lokomotiv 1−3 Botev			Bulgarian Cup Round of 32 – 2nd leg
1984–85	19 June 1985	Botev 2−1 Lokomotiv	Plovdiv Stadium	15,000	Bulgarian Cup Third Place Playoff
1986–87	10 December 1986	Lokomotiv 3−1 (a.e.t.) Botev			Bulgarian Cup Round of 16
1987–88	23 December 1987	Botev 3−0 Lokomotiv			Bulgarian Cup Round of 16
1994–95	18 February 1995	Lokomotiv 3−5 Botev	Lokomotiv Stadium	17,000	Bulgarian Cup Round of 16 – 1st leg
1994–95	8 March 1995	Botev 2−1 Lokomotiv			Bulgarian Cup Round of 16 – 2nd leg
2004–05	15 March 2005	Botev 1−2 (a.e.t.) Lokomotiv	Hristo Botev Stadium	15,000	Bulgarian Cup Quarterfinal
2014–15	28 October 2014	Lokomotiv 1−1 Botev	Lokomotiv Stadium	3,070	Bulgarian Cup Round of 16 – 1st leg
2014–15	3 December 2014	Botev 1−2 Lokomotiv	Botev 1912 Football Complex	2,400	Bulgarian Cup Round of 16 – 2nd leg
2018–19	15 May 2019	Botev 0−1 Lokomotiv	Vasil Levski National Stadium, Sofia	20,500	Bulgarian Cup Final
2025–26	12 February 2026	Lokomotiv 1−0 Botev	Stadion Lokomotiv		Bulgarian Cup Quarterfinal

== Overall match statistics ==
As of 9 April 2026

	Games played	Botev wins	Draws	Lokomotiv wins	Botev goals	Lokomotiv goals
Parva Liga	124	43	38	43	146	148
Bulgarian Cup	13	6	1	6	25	20
	137	49	39	49	171	168

=== Head-to-head ranking in First League (1948–2024) ===
P.	49	50	51	52	53	54	55	56	57	58	59	60	61	62	63	64	65	66	67	68	69	70	71	72	73	74	75	76	77	78	79	80	81	82	83	84	85	86	87	88	89	90	91	92	93	94	95	96	97	98	99	00	01	02	03	04	05	06	07	08	09	10	11	12	13	14	15	16	17	18	19	20	21	22	23	24	25
1																			1																																					1																					
2															2										2													2																																			2				
3								3					3								3					3							3		3		3		3	3				3	3	3	3										3																	3			
4					4									4								4	4					4		4											4			4	4									4											4	4											
5																		5				5	5									5											5			5			5									5					5					5	5	5		5			5	5	
6				6		6											6			6	6			6			6	6											6																6						6			6			6				6						6
7	7	7	7									7			7	7																		7				7		7		7					7												7							7		7				7					
8									8		8					8													8		8																					8																	8	8							
9				9						9										9					9											9																								9					9									9		9	
10			10				10											10						10		10	10																					10	10										10								10				10		10		10		
11					11														11										11	11													11					11		11																											
12														12			12																																						12					12		12															
13							13																																			13								13	13		13					13			13																13
14																															14										14															14																					
15																																15				15															15																										
16																																																														16															
17																																																																													
18																																																																													

• Total: Botev Plovdiv with 43 higher finishes, Lokomotiv Plovdiv with 33 higher finishes (as of the end of the 2023–24 season).

== Trophies ==
National Competition	Botev Plovdiv	Lokomotiv Plovdiv
Bulgarian Championship	2	1
Bulgarian Cup	4	2
Bulgarian Supercup	1	2
Cup of the Soviet Army	0	1
Balkans Cup	1	0
Total	8	6

Notes:

- Bulgarian Cup section includes Soviet Army Cup as major Cup tournament.
- Soviet Army Cup section includes the period after 1982 as secondary Cup tournament.
- Italics indicates defunct tournaments.
