= 1958 PFC Cherno More Varna season =

Cherno More Varna
1958 season
- Manager: Ivan Mokanov
- Republican Football Group A: 12th

The 1958 season was Cherno More's second consecutive season in A Group after the dramatic survival in 1957. The club competed as Botev Varna. The Republican Section for Football, having decided in favor of reorganizing the league to a fall-to-spring cycle, halted the season on 6 July 1958 with the teams having played each other once. League leaders CDNA were declared champions and no teams were relegated.

== Republican Football Group A ==
=== Matches ===
9 March 1958 Round 1	CDNA	4–0	Botev Varna	Sofia

16 March 1958 Round 2	Botev Varna	1–3	Spartak Varna	Varna

23 March 1958 Round 3	Botev Plovdiv	3–0	Botev Varna	Plovdiv

30 March 1958 Round 4	Botev Varna	1–0	Slavia Sofia	Varna

13 April 1958 Round 5	Minyor Dimitrovo	4–2	Botev Varna	Pernik

20 April 1958 Round 6	Botev Varna	1–2	Spartak Pleven	Varna

26 April 1958 Round 7	Levski Sofia	0–1	Botev Varna	Sofia

15 June 1958 Round 9	Botev Varna	0–1	Spartak Plovdiv	Varna

26 June 1958 Round 8	Lokomotiv Sofia	2–0	Botev Varna	Sofia

29 June 1958 Round 10	Dunav Ruse	2–0	Botev Varna	Ruse

6 July 1958 Round 11	Botev Varna	2–1	Botev Stara Zagora	Varna

=== League standings ===
Pos	Team	Pld	W	D	L	GF	GA	GD	Pts
8	Spartak Varna	11	4	2	5	19	18	+1	10
9	Botev Plovdiv	11	3	3	5	14	18	−4	9
10	Beroe Stara Zagora	11	3	2	6	13	19	−6	8
11	Dunav Ruse	11	2	4	5	11	19	−8	8
12	Cherno More Varna	11	3	0	8	8	22	−14	6

Source: rsssf.com

=== Results summary ===
Overall								Home						Away					
Pld	W	D	L	GF	GA	GD	Pts	W	D	L	GF	GA	GD	W	D	L	GF	GA	GD
11	3	0	8	8	22	−14	9	2	0	3	5	7	−2	1	0	5	3	15	−12
