= 1951 Bulgarian Cup final =

- Event: 1951 Bulgarian Cup
CSKA Sofia	Akademik Sofia
1	0
- After extra time
- Date: 7 November 1951
- Venue: People's Army Stadium, Sofia
- Referee: Andrey Zlatarev (Sofia)
- Attendance: 25,000

The 1951 Bulgarian Cup final was the 11th final of the Bulgarian Cup (in this period the tournament was named Cup of the Soviet Army), and was contested between CSKA Sofia and Akademik Sofia on 7 November 1951 at People's Army Stadium in Sofia. CSKA won the final 1–0 after extra time.

== Route to the Final ==
CSKA		Round	Akademik
Opponent	Result		Opponent	Result
Cherno More Varna	4–0 home	Round of 16	Lokomotiv Plovdiv	2–0 away
Stroitel Sofia	3–1 home	Quarter-finals	Spartak Pleven	3–1 home
Levski Sofia	3–0 home	Semi-finals	Spartak Sofia	3–2 home

== Match ==
=== Details ===
7 November 1951

CSKA Sofia	1−0 (a.e.t.)	Akademik Sofia
Milanov 104'

People's Army Stadium, Sofia
Attendance: 25,000
Referee: Andrey Zlatarev (Sofia)

CSKA	Akademik

GK	1	(Bulgaria) Georgi Kekemanov
DF	2	(Bulgaria) Georgi Tsvetkov
DF	3	(Bulgaria) Manol Manolov
DF	4	(Bulgaria) Georgi Enisheynov
MF	5	(Bulgaria) Stefan Bozhkov (c)
MF	6	(Bulgaria) Gavril Stoyanov
FW	7	(Bulgaria) Dimitar Milanov
MF	8	(Bulgaria) Mihail Yankov
FW	9	(Bulgaria) Panayot Panayotov
MF	10	(Bulgaria) Gancho Vasilev	(substituted off) 96'
MF	11	(Bulgaria) Stefan Stefanov
Substitutes:
MF	--	(Bulgaria) Angel Milanov	(substituted in) 96'
Manager:
(Bulgaria) Krum Milev

GK	1	(Bulgaria) Ivan Kyupev
DF	2	(Bulgaria) Todor Finkov
DF	3	(Bulgaria) Kiril Chipev
DF	4	(Bulgaria) Ivan Atanasov
MF	5	(Bulgaria) Vladimir Kramarenko
MF	6	(Bulgaria) Rumen Aprilov
FW	7	(Albania) Skënder Begeja
MF	8	(Bulgaria) Vasil Vulov
FW	9	(Bulgaria) Ivan Trendafilov
FW	10	(Bulgaria) Vasil Spasov (c)
MF	11	(Bulgaria) Hristo Konakov	(substituted off) 96'
Substitutes:
MF	--	(Bulgaria) Dimitar Samsarov	(substituted in) 96'
Manager:
(Bulgaria) Lyubomir Petrov

== See also ==
- 1951 A Group
