= Mitev =

Mitev (Bulgarian: Митев) is a Bulgarian masculine surname, its feminine counterpart is Miteva. It may refer to

- Boban Mitev (born 1972), Macedonian basketball coach
- Danail Mitev (born 1984), Bulgarian football player
- Ivan Mitev (1924–2007), Bulgarian pediatrician and cardio rheumatologist
- Konstantin Mitev (born 1984), Bulgarian volleyball player
- Silvia Miteva (born 1986), Bulgarian rhythmic gymnast
- Stanimir Mitev (born 1985), Bulgarian football player
- Vanio Mitev (born 1954), Bulgarian medical scientist
- Viktor Mitev (born 1992), Bulgarian football player
- Zdravko Mitev (born 1944), Bulgarian football player

== See also ==
- Mitev Glacier in Antarctica
