= Hristo Nikolov =

Hristo Nikolov may refer to:

- Hristo Nikolov-Choko (born 1939), Bulgarian footballer
- Hristo Nikolov (basketball) (born 1985), Bulgarian basketball player
- Hristo Nikolov (volleyball) (born 1990), Macedonian volleyball player
