= 1952 A Group =

8th season of top-tier football league in Bulgaria

A Group
- Season: 1952
- Champions: CSKA Sofia (3rd title)
- Relegated: Akademik Sofia; Spartak Varna
- Matches played: 132
- Goals scored: 292 (2.21 per match)
- Top goalscorer: Dimitar Isakov; Dobromir Tashkov; (10 goals each)

The 1952 A Group was the fourth season of the A Football Group, the top Bulgarian professional league for association football clubs, since its establishment in 1948.

== Overview ==
It was contested by 12 teams, and CSKA Sofia, who were the defending champions, won the championship.

== League standings ==
Pos	Team	Pld	W	D	L	GF	GA	GD	Pts	Relegation
1	CSKA Sofia (C)	22	13	7	2	38	12	+26	33	
2	Spartak Sofia	22	9	8	5	30	13	+17	26	
3	Lokomotiv Sofia	22	11	3	8	30	22	+8	25	
4	Spartak Pleven	22	8	8	6	19	21	−2	24	
5	Levski Sofia	22	8	6	8	22	16	+6	22	
6	Lokomotiv Plovdiv	22	9	4	9	24	26	−2	22	
7	Cherno More Varna	22	8	6	8	22	32	−10	22	
8	Slavia Sofia	22	8	5	9	29	22	+7	21	
9	Botev Plovdiv	22	9	1	12	17	25	−8	19	
10	Minyor Pernik	22	7	4	11	26	34	−8	18	
11	Akademik Sofia (R)	22	6	6	10	19	32	−13	18	Relegation to 1953 B Group
12	Spartak Varna (R)	22	4	6	12	16	37	−21	14	Relegation to 1953 B Group

Source: rsssf.com
(C) Champions; (R) Relegated

== Results ==
Home \ Away	AKD	BPD	CHM	CSK	LEV	LPL	LSO	MIN	SLA	SPL	SSF	SPV
Akademik Sofia		2–0	2–0	1–1	1–1	1–0	2–0	0–0	1–1	1–1	2–3	2–0
Botev Plovdiv	1–0		0–2	0–1	1–0	1–2	1–0	1–0	1–2	1–0	2–0	2–0
Cherno More	5–1	2–1		0–0	1–0	0–0	1–0	2–1	3–2	0–1	0–0	3–2
CSKA Sofia	1–0	3–0	4–1		3–1	5–1	4–0	1–2	1–0	1–0	1–0	5–0
Levski Sofia	4–0	0–0	5–0	0–1		1–0	0–1	2–1	2–0	0–1	0–0	1–0
Lokomotiv Plovdiv	0–0	1–0	0–0	1–0	0–0		3–2	4–1	0–2	6–1	1–4	2–1
Lokomotiv Sofia	4–0	1–0	1–0	2–2	3–0	1–0		3–1	1–0	1–0	1–0	5–0
Minyor Pernik	2–1	1–2	3–0	2–2	1–3	1–0	1–0		0–1	1–1	1–1	4–0
Slavia Sofia	3–0	4–1	6–1	0–1	1–1	0–1	2–1	1–2		2–0	0–0	0–0
Spartak Pleven	1–0	2–1	2–0	0–0	1–0	2–1	2–2	2–1	0–0		0–0	0–0
Spartak Sofia	3–0	0–1	1–1	1–1	0–0	3–0	2–0	3–0	3–1	1–0		5–0
Spartak Varna	1–2	2–0	0–0	0–0	0–1	0–1	1–1	4–0	2–1	2–2	1–0	

Source: A PFG (in Bulgarian)
Legend: Blue = home team win; Yellow = draw; Red = away team win.

== Champions ==
CSKA Sofia

Goalkeepers
(Bulgaria) Georgi Kekemanov	12	(0)
(Bulgaria) Stefan Gerenski	10	(0)

Defenders
(Bulgaria) Georgi Tsvetkov	21	(0)
(Bulgaria) Kiril Rakarov	5	(0)
(Bulgaria) Georgi Enisheynov	20	(0)
(Bulgaria) Manol Manolov	21	(0)

Midfielders
(Bulgaria) Gavril Stoyanov	18	(1)
(Bulgaria) Stefan Bozhkov	22	(8)
(Bulgaria) Atanas Tsanov	6	(0)

Forwards
(Bulgaria) Krum Yanev	11	(2)
(Bulgaria) Dimitar Milanov	21	(8)
(Bulgaria) Mihail Yankov	14	(3)
(Bulgaria) Ivan Kolev	18	(3)
(Bulgaria) Stefan Stefanov	17	(2)
(Bulgaria) Angel Milanov	9	(2)
(Bulgaria) Petar Mihaylov	8	(3)
(Bulgaria) Panayot Panayotov	21	(5)

Manager
(Bulgaria) Krum Milev

== Top scorers ==
Rank	Scorer	Club	Goals
1	(Bulgaria) Dimitar Isakov	Slavia Sofia	10
1	(Bulgaria) Dobromir Tashkov	Spartak Sofia	10
3	(Bulgaria) Stefan Bozhkov	CSKA Sofia	8
3	(Bulgaria) Dimitar Milanov	CSKA Sofia	8
3	(Bulgaria) Todor Diev	Spartak Sofia	8
6	(Bulgaria) Nikolay Milkov	Lokomotiv Plovdiv	7
6	(Bulgaria) Arsen Dimitrov	Levski Sofia	7
6	(Bulgaria) Georgi Dimitrov	Cherno More Varna	7
9	(Bulgaria) Yordan Tomov	Levski Sofia	6
9	(Bulgaria) Toma Zahariev	Slavia Sofia	6
9	(Bulgaria) Nikola Bogdanov	Lokomotiv Sofia	6
9	(Bulgaria) Ivan Trendafilov	Akademik Sofia	6
9	(Bulgaria) Dimitar Samsarov	Akademik Sofia	6
9	(Bulgaria) Georgi Arnaudov	Spartak Varna	6
