= Panayot Panayotov (footballer) =

Bulgarian footballer

Personal information
- Full name: Panayot Mitov Panayotov
- Date of birth: 30 December 1930
- Place of birth: Sofia, Bulgaria
- Date of death: 5 April 1996 (aged 65)
- Position: Forward

Youth career
- Sportist Sofia

Senior career*
Years	Team	Apps	(Gls)
1946–1949	Sportist Sofia		
1949	Cherveno Zname		
1950–1964	CSKA Sofia	294	(68)

International career
1952–1962	Bulgaria	45	(5)
- * Club domestic league appearances and goals

Panayot Mitov Panayotov (Bulgarian: Панайот Митов Панайотов; 30 December 1930 – 5 April 1996) was a Bulgarian football forward who played for Bulgaria in the 1962 FIFA World Cup.

== Career ==
Panayotov began his playing career with Sportist Sofia. In 1949, after merger of Sportist and Sredets, he joined the new formed club DSO Cherveno Zname.

In early 1950, Panayotov joined CSKA Sofia, where he won eleven A Group titles and four Bulgarian Cups. During his fourteen years with CSKA, he scored 68 goals in 294 matches.

== Honours ==
=== Club ===
CSKA Sofia

- A Group (11): 1951, 1952, 1954, 1955, 1956, 1957, 1958, 1958–59, 1959–60, 1960–61, 1961–62
- Bulgarian Cup (4): 1951, 1954, 1955, 1961

=== International ===
Bulgaria

- Olympic Bronze Medal: 1956
