= Georgi Enisheynov =

Bulgarian footballer

Personal information
- Date of birth: 12 April 1929
- Place of birth: Dupnitsa, Bulgaria
- Date of death: 7 November 2002 (aged 73)
- Place of death: Sofia, Bulgaria
- Position: Defender

Senior career*
Years	Team	Apps	(Gls)
1945–1946	Botev Plovdiv	6	(0)
1947–1950	Marek Dupnitsa	41	(2)
1951–1960	CSKA Sofia	146	(0)

International career
1952–1959	Bulgaria	10	(0)
- * Club domestic league appearances and goals

Georgi Enisheynov (Bulgarian: Георги Енишейнов; 12 April 1929 - 7 November 2002) was a Bulgarian footballer who played as a defender. For 10 seasons he made 146 league appearances for CSKA Sofia.

== Honours ==
=== Club ===
CSKA Sofia

- Bulgarian A Group (9): 1951, 1952, 1954, 1955, 1956, 1957, 1958, 1958–59, 1959–60
- Bulgarian Cup (3): 1951, 1954, 1955
