= Nedyalko Hubenov =

Bulgarian footballer

Personal information
- Full name: Nedyalko Hubenov Kolev
- Date of birth: 23 August 1979 (age 47)
- Place of birth: Haskovo, Bulgaria
- Height: 1.82 m (6 ft 0 in)
- Position: Right wing back

Team information
- Current team: Dimitrovgrad

Youth career
- Haskovo

Senior career*
Years	Team	Apps	(Gls)
1998–2003	Haskovo		
2003–2005	Lokomotiv Plovdiv	28	(0)
2006	Haskovo	7	(1)
2006–2010	Dunav Ruse	73	(4)
2010–2011	Lyubimets 2007	10	(1)
2011–2014	Haskovo	67	(13)
2015–	Dimitrovgrad	26	(5)
- * Club domestic league appearances and goals as of 25 January 2016

Nedyalko Hubenov (Bulgarian: Недялко Хубенов; born 23 August 1979) is a Bulgarian footballer who currently plays for Dimitrovgrad. Hubenov plays in a wingback position.

During his time with Haskovo, he frequently served as the team captain.

== Honours ==
=== Club ===
Lokomotiv Plovdiv

- Bulgarian A Group: 2003–04
