= Vasil Kamburov =

Bulgarian footballer

Personal information
- Date of birth: 4 December 1975 (age 50)
- Place of birth: Veliko Tarnovo, Bulgaria
- Height: 1.88 m (6 ft 2 in)
- Position: Goalkeeper

Team information
- Current team: Rodopa Smolyan
- Number: 12

Senior career*
Years	Team	Apps	(Gls)
1993–1998	Loko Plovdiv	110	(0)
1998–2000	PFC Belasitsa	39	(0)
2000	PFC Dobrudzha	14	(0)
2001	FC Krichim	26	(0)
2002–2007	Loko Plovdiv	69	(0)
2008–?	Rodopa Smolyan		
- * Club domestic league appearances and goals as of 30 April 2008

Vasil Kamburov (Bulgarian: Васил Камбуров) (born 4 December 1975) is a retired Bulgarian footballer who last played for Rodopa Smolyan as a goalkeeper. He has also been employed as a goalkeeping coach at Loko Plovdiv. He was the 1st choice goalkeeper for Lokomotiv Plovdiv during their 1st and only season as champions of Bulgaria.
