= 1957 A Group =

13th season of top-tier football league in Bulgaria

A Group
- Season: 1957
- Champions: CSKA Sofia (7th title)
- European Cup: CSKA Sofia
- Matches: 132
- Goals: 367 (2.78 per match)
- Top goalscorer: Hristo Iliev (14 goals)

The 1957 A Group was the ninth season of the A Football Group, the top Bulgarian professional league for association football clubs, since its establishment in 1948.

== Overview ==
It was contested by 12 teams, and CSKA Sofia won the championship for a third consecutive title.

== League standings ==
Pos	Team	Pld	W	D	L	GF	GA	GD	Pts	Qualification or relegation
1	CSKA Sofia (C)	22	15	4	3	53	16	+37	34	Qualification for European Cup first round
2	Lokomotiv Sofia	22	16	1	5	33	19	+14	33	
3	Levski Sofia	22	12	6	4	46	21	+25	30	
4	Spartak Pleven	22	8	8	6	28	28	0	24	
5	Minyor Pernik	22	8	6	8	30	26	+4	22	
6	Slavia Sofia	22	7	6	9	38	39	−1	20	
7	Spartak Plovdiv	22	7	5	10	33	41	−8	19	
8	Botev Plovdiv	22	6	7	9	22	33	−11	19	
9	Cherno More Varna	22	5	8	9	19	24	−5	18	
10	Spartak Varna	22	6	6	10	23	31	−8	18	
11	Spartak Sofia (R)	22	4	8	10	22	35	−13	16	Relegation to 1958 B Group
12	Marek Dupnitsa (R)	22	2	7	13	20	54	−34	11	Relegation to 1958 B Group

Source: rsssf.com
(C) Champions; (R) Relegated

== Results ==
Home \ Away	BPD	CHM	CSK	LEV	LSO	MAR	MIN	SLA	SPL	SPD	SSF	SPV
Botev Plovdiv		1–0	0–3	0–4	1–2	0–0	2–3	3–0	3–1	2–2	1–0	0–0
Cherno More	1–0		1–1	1–1	1–0	4–0	0–0	2–2	0–0	3–0	1–1	1–0
CSKA Sofia	2–0	0–0		4–0	3–0	2–0	0–1	3–0	1–0	5–2	5–1	4–1
Levski Sofia	0–0	3–2	0–0		0–1	6–0	4–2	2–2	4–0	3–1	6–1	3–0
Lokomotiv Sofia	5–0	1–0	0–2	1–0		2–1	1–0	3–1	1–0	1–0	3–0	3–2
Marek Dupnitsa	2–3	1–0	2–6	1–2	2–2		1–1	1–4	2–2	4–0	0–0	0–1
Minyor Pernik	0–1	2–0	1–1	1–2	0–1	5–0		2–3	0–0	2–0	1–0	2–1
Slavia Sofia	2–2	2–1	3–1	2–2	2–0	3–0	1–3		0–1	4–5	1–1	3–0
Spartak Pleven	1–1	3–1	1–2	2–1	1–0	1–1	3–1	2–1		3–1	1–0	1–1
Spartak Plovdiv	1–0	0–0	1–0	0–1	2–3	5–0	3–1	2–0	3–3		3–2	1–1
Spartak Sofia	1–1	3–0	1–4	0–0	0–1	4–1	2–2	2–1	1–1	1–1		1–0
Spartak Varna	3–1	3–0	1–4	0–2	1–2	1–1	0–0	1–1	3–1	2–0	1–0	

Source: A PFG (in Bulgarian)
Legend: Blue = home team win; Yellow = draw; Red = away team win.

== Champions ==
CSKA Sofia

Goalkeepers
(Bulgaria) Georgi Naydenov	15	(0)
(Bulgaria) Hristo Andonov	7	(0)

Defenders
(Bulgaria) Georgi Tsvetkov	6	(0)
(Bulgaria) Kiril Rakarov	19	(1)
(Bulgaria) Georgi Enisheynov	6	(0)
(Bulgaria) Manol Manolov	22	(0)
(Bulgaria) Nikola Kovachev	19	(1)

Midfielders
(Bulgaria) Gavril Stoyanov	17	(2)
(Bulgaria) Stefan Bozhkov	20	(4)
(Bulgaria) Petar Aleksiev	6	(0)

Forwards
(Bulgaria) Krum Yanev	19	(6)
(Bulgaria) Dimitar Milanov	19	(13)
(Bulgaria) Pavel Vladimirov	7	(2)
(Bulgaria) Georgi Dimitrov	21	(10)
(Bulgaria) Ivan Kolev	13	(4)
(Bulgaria) Stefan Stefanov	3	(0)
(Bulgaria) Petar Mihaylov	8	(4)
(Bulgaria) Panayot Panayotov	18	(6)

Manager
(Bulgaria) Krum Milev

== Top scorers ==
Rank	Scorer	Club	Goals
1	(Bulgaria) Hristo Iliev	Levski Sofia	14
2	(Bulgaria) Dimitar Yordanov	Levski Sofia	13
2	(Bulgaria) Dimitar Milanov	CSKA Sofia	13
4	(Bulgaria) Dobromir Tashkov	Slavia Sofia	11
4	(Bulgaria) Spiro Debarski	Lokomotiv Sofia	11
6	(Bulgaria) Stoyan Stamov	Lokomotiv Sofia	10
6	(Bulgaria) Georgi Dimitrov	CSKA Sofia	10
6	(Bulgaria) Dimo Pechenikov	Levski Sofia	10
6	(Bulgaria) Todor Diev	Spartak Plovdiv	10
6	(Bulgaria) Stoyan Zdravkov	Spartak Pleven	10
