= 1955 A Group =

11th season of top-tier football league in Bulgaria

A Group
- Season: 1955
- Champions: CSKA Sofia (5th title)
- European Cup: CSKA Sofia
- Matches: 157
- Goals: 392 (2.5 per match)
- Top goalscorer: Todor Diev (13 goals)

The 1955 A Group was the seventh season of the A Football Group, the top Bulgarian professional league for association football clubs, since its establishment in 1948.

== Overview ==
It was contested by 14 teams, and CSKA Sofia won the championship.

== League standings ==
Pos	Team	Pld	W	D	L	GF	GA	GD	Pts	Qualification or relegation
1	CDNA Sofia (C)	26	14	9	3	38	16	+22	37	Qualification for the European Cup preliminary round
2	Slavia Sofia	26	14	3	9	34	20	+14	31	
3	Spartak Varna	26	8	12	6	26	25	+1	28	
4	Minyor Pernik	26	11	5	10	29	24	+5	27	
5	Levski Sofia	26	10	7	9	33	30	+3	27	
6	Spartak Plovdiv	26	11	5	10	25	25	0	27	
7	Lokomotiv Sofia	26	9	9	8	33	34	−1	27	
8	VVS Sofia	26	7	12	7	34	28	+6	26	
9	Spartak Pleven	26	9	8	9	31	30	+1	26	
10	Botev Plovdiv	26	9	8	9	27	31	−4	26	
11	Zavod 12 Sofia	26	9	7	10	26	27	−1	25	
12	Cherno More Varna (R)	26	10	5	11	26	28	−2	25	Relegation to 1956 B Group
13	Lokomotiv Plovdiv (R)	26	6	6	14	18	29	−11	18	Relegation to 1956 B Group
14	Pavlikeni (R)	26	5	4	17	12	45	−33	14	Relegation to 1956 B Group

Source: rsssf.com
(C) Champions; (R) Relegated

== Results ==
Home \ Away	BPD	CHM	CSK	LEV	LPL	LSO	MIN	PAV	SLA	SPL	SPD	SPV	VVS	ZAV
Botev Plovdiv		2–0	1–1	0–1	3–0	0–2	1–4	1–0	1–0	3–1	1–1	1–2	1–1	1–1
Cherno More	0–1		1–0	2–1	1–0	1–0	0–2	8–0	1–0	1–1	0–1	2–1	1–1	1–0
CSKA Sofia	1–1	3–0		3–0	2–0	1–0	2–1	2–0	1–0	1–1	0–1	5–2	3–1	2–1
Levski Sofia	2–0	1–0	1–3		1–0	1–1	3–0	4–0	2–2	1–1	0–1	1–0	3–2	1–1
Lokomotiv Plovdiv	0–1	2–1	0–0	0–1		0–1	3–0	3–0	0–0	1–0	3–0	1–1	1–1	2–2
Lokomotiv Sofia	2–0	0–0	0–0	3–2	2–0		1–1	2–0	2–4	1–0	4–2	2–0	1–0	0–2
Minyor Pernik	2–0	4–1	2–2	1–0	3–0	1–0		2–1	0–1	0–1	0–0	0–0	0–0	1–0
Pavlikeni	3–1	0–0	1–2	0–1	0–0	1–0	0–1		0–2	0–2	2–1	1–0	1–0	1–0
Slavia Sofia	2–3	3–1	1–0	2–1	1–0	3–0	2–1	3–0		2–0	1–0	1–1	0–1	2–0
Spartak Pleven	0–0	1–0	0–0	1–1	3–0	1–0	2–1	6–1	0–1		1–0	2–2	1–1	1–0
Spartak Plovdiv	0–0	0–1	0–2	3–2	0–1	1–1	2–0	1–0	1–0	2–1		3–1	2–0	0–2
Spartak Varna	2–0	0–0	1–1	0–0	1–0	3–0	1–0	1–0	2–1	1–0	0–0		0–0	3–0
VVS Sofia	1–2	3–0	0–0	1–1	3–1	2–2	1–0	0–0	1–0	6–1	0–2	2–2		4–1
Zavod 12 Sofia	2–0	1–2	0–1	3–1	2–0	2–1	1–1	1–1	1–0	1–0	2–1	0–0	1–0	

Source: A PFG (in Bulgarian)
Legend: Blue = home team win; Yellow = draw; Red = away team win.

== Champions ==
CSKA Sofia

Goalkeepers
(Bulgaria) Georgi Naydenov	21	(0)
(Bulgaria) Hristo Andonov	5	(0)

Defenders
(Bulgaria) Georgi Tsvetkov	10	(0)
(Bulgaria) Kiril Rakarov	24	(0)
(Bulgaria) Georgi Enisheynov	22	(0)
(Bulgaria) Manol Manolov	20	(0)

Midfielders
(Bulgaria) Gavril Stoyanov	25	(1)
(Bulgaria) Stefan Bozhkov	24	(6)
(Bulgaria) Ivan Georgiev	11	(2)

Forwards
(Bulgaria) Krum Yanev	23	(3)
(Bulgaria) Dimitar Milanov	19	(1)
(Bulgaria) Georgi Dimitrov	24	(9)
(Bulgaria) Ivan Kolev	14	(3)
(Bulgaria) Stefan Stefanov	12	(1)
(Bulgaria) Petar Mihaylov	16	(6)
(Bulgaria) Panayot Panayotov	23	(4)

Manager
(Bulgaria) Krum Milev

== Top scorers ==
Rank	Scorer	Club	Goals
1	(Bulgaria) Todor Diev	Spartak Plovdiv	13
2	(Bulgaria) Dimitar Yordanov	VVS Sofia	11
3	(Bulgaria) Dobromir Tashkov	Slavia Sofia	9
3	(Bulgaria) Georgi Dimitrov	CSKA Sofia	9
5	(Bulgaria) Petar Kolev	Lokomotiv Plovdiv	8
5	(Bulgaria) Dimitar Bachev	VVS Sofia	8
7	(Bulgaria) Pavel Vladimirov	Minyor Pernik	7
7	(Bulgaria) Zhivko Karadaliev	Minyor Pernik	7
7	(Bulgaria) Hristo Nanov	Spartak Varna	7
