= 1954 A Group =

10th season of top-tier football league in Bulgaria

A Group
- Season: 1954
- Champions: CSKA Sofia (4th title)
- Matches: 182
- Goals: 481 (2.64 per match)
- Top goalscorer: Dobromir Tashkov (25 goals)

The 1954 A Group was the sixth season of the A Football Group, the top Bulgarian professional league for association football clubs, since its establishment in 1948.

== Overview ==
It was contested by 14 teams, and CSKA Sofia won the championship.

== League standings ==
Pos	Team	Pld	W	D	L	GF	GA	GD	Pts	Relegation
1	CSKA Sofia (C)	26	20	5	1	76	14	+62	45	
2	Slavia Sofia	26	17	4	5	67	24	+43	38	
3	Lokomotiv Sofia	26	15	6	5	56	25	+31	36	
4	Zavod 12 Sofia	26	9	11	6	26	24	+2	29	
5	Levski Sofia	26	9	10	7	39	26	+13	28	
6	Lokomotiv Plovdiv	26	8	9	9	33	32	+1	25	
7	Cherno More Varna	26	9	7	10	27	29	−2	25	
8	Minyor Pernik	26	9	6	11	32	36	−4	24	
9	Spartak Plovdiv	26	9	6	11	29	34	−5	24	
10	Spartak Varna	26	7	9	10	34	42	−8	23	
11	Spartak Pleven	26	6	11	9	17	25	−8	23	
12	Velbazhd Kyustendil (R)	26	7	6	13	19	50	−31	20	Relegation to 1955 B Group
13	Torpedo Pleven (R)	26	5	5	16	13	51	−38	15	Relegation to 1955 B Group
14	Beroe Stara Zagora (R)	26	2	5	19	13	69	−56	9	Relegation to 1955 B Group

Source: rsssf.com
(C) Champions; (R) Relegated

== Results ==
Home \ Away	BSZ	CHM	CSK	LEV	LPL	LSO	MIN	SLA	SPL	SPD	SPV	TOR	VEL	ZAV
Beroe Stara Zagora		1–1	0–4	1–2	1–4	2–5	0–1	0–4	0–0	1–2	0–0	1–0	3–1	0–0
Cherno More	3–0		2–4	1–0	2–0	0–1	2–1	1–2	1–1	2–0	1–1	3–0	2–0	0–0
CSKA Sofia	8–1	3–0		3–1	4–0	4–0	2–0	3–1	4–0	2–0	7–2	8–1	3–0	5–0
Levski Sofia	3–0	3–0	2–2		6–0	1–1	2–0	0–2	1–0	3–0	2–1	4–0	0–0	0–0
Lokomotiv Plovdiv	4–0	3–0	0–0	1–1		0–1	2–0	1–0	1–1	0–0	2–1	5–0	3–0	0–0
Lokomotiv Sofia	6–0	1–0	0–0	1–1	5–1		4–0	2–3	2–0	3–1	5–1	4–1	6–0	1–1
Minyor Pernik	2–0	2–1	1–2	1–1	0–0	1–0		3–6	2–1	4–0	0–0	3–0	5–1	0–1
Slavia Sofia	8–1	3–1	0–1	2–0	1–1	2–0	0–1		4–2	1–0	6–1	4–0	7–0	3–1
Spartak Pleven	2–1	0–0	0–0	2–2	2–1	1–1	2–1	1–0		1–0	0–0	1–0	0–0	0–1
Spartak Plovdiv	3–0	0–0	2–0	1–1	3–2	1–2	0–0	0–1	1–0		1–0	4–0	4–2	2–1
Spartak Varna	2–0	1–0	0–2	1–0	0–0	1–3	1–1	3–3	0–0	5–2		1–0	6–1	4–3
Torpedo Pleven	2–0	0–1	0–2	1–0	2–1	1–2	1–1	0–3	0–0	1–1	1–1		1–0	1–0
Velbazhd Kyustendil	2–0	0–1	0–2	2–2	2–1	0–0	2–1	1–1	1–0	0–0	1–0	1–0		1–0
Zavod 12 Sofia	0–0	2–2	1–1	3–1	0–0	1–0	5–1	0–0	1–0	2–1	1–0	0–0	2–1	

Source: A PFG (in Bulgarian)
Legend: Blue = home team win; Yellow = draw; Red = away team win.

== Champions ==
CSKA Sofia

Goalkeepers
(Bulgaria) Stefan Gerenski	19	(0)
(Bulgaria) Hristo Andonov	7	(0)

Defenders
(Bulgaria) Georgi Tsvetkov	11	(0)
(Bulgaria) Kiril Rakarov	25	(2)
(Bulgaria) Georgi Enisheynov	18	(0)
(Bulgaria) Manol Manolov	22	(1)

Midfielders
(Bulgaria) Gavril Stoyanov	20	(2)
(Bulgaria) Stefan Bozhkov	24	(7)
(Bulgaria) Atanas Tsanov	17	(3)

Forwards
(Bulgaria) Krum Yanev	22	(16)
(Bulgaria) Dimitar Milanov	24	(14)
(Bulgaria) Mihail Yankov	6	(0)
(Bulgaria) Ivan Kolev	23	(12)
(Bulgaria) Stefan Stefanov	19	(3)
(Bulgaria) Peycho Peev	1	(0)
(Bulgaria) Petar Mihaylov	17	(7)
(Bulgaria) Panayot Panayotov	23	(9)

Manager
(Bulgaria) Krum Milev

== Top scorers ==
Rank	Scorer	Club	Goals
1	(Bulgaria) Dobromir Tashkov	Slavia Sofia	25
2	(Bulgaria) Petar Argirov	Lokomotiv Sofia	17
3	(Bulgaria) Krum Yanev	CSKA Sofia	16
4	(Bulgaria) Grigor Ahtimov	Slavia Sofia	15
5	(Bulgaria) Dimitar Milanov	CSKA Sofia	14
6	(Bulgaria) Ivan Kolev	CSKA Sofia	12
6	(Bulgaria) Dimitar Yordanov	Zavod 12 Sofia	12
8	(Bulgaria) Georgi Stoychev	Slavia Sofia	11
8	(Bulgaria) Dimitar Popdimitrov	Levski Sofia	11
8	(Bulgaria) Nikola Dechev	Lokomotiv Sofia	11
