= Vasil Dragolov =

Bulgarian footballer

Personal information
- Full name: Vasil Ivanov Dragolov
- Date of birth: 15 September 1962 (age 64)
- Place of birth: Katunitsa, Bulgaria
- Height: 1.74 m (5 ft 8 1/2 in)
- Position: Forward

Senior career*
Years	Team	Apps	(Gls)
1979–1980	Hebar Pazardzhik		
1980–1988	Beroe	206	(63)
1988–1989	Levski Sofia	29	(17)
1989–1990	Larissa	31	(6)
1990–1991	Ionikos	30	(4)
1991–1993	Torreense	59	(13)
1993	Beroe	7	(0)
1994	Cherno More	13	(5)
1994–1995	Beroe	18	(3)
Total		386	(112)

International career
1985–1992	Bulgaria	5	(1)
- * Club domestic league appearances and goals

Vasil Ivanov Dragolov (Bulgarian: Васил Иванов Драголов; born 15 September 1962) is a former Bulgarian footballer, who played as a forward.

For the Bulgarian national team, he amassed 5 appearances, netting 1 goal.

== Honours ==
Beroe

- A PFG Winner: 1985-86
