= Dimitar Trendafilov =

Bulgarian footballer and manager

Personal information
- Full name: Dimitar Trendafilov Vasilev
- Date of birth: 25 February 1967 (age 59)
- Place of birth: Varna, Bulgaria
- Height: 1.93 m (6 ft 4 in)
- Position: Forward

Team information
- Current team: Spartak Varna II (manager)

Youth career
- 1977–1984: Spartak Varna

Senior career*
Years	Team	Apps	(Gls)
1984–1991	Spartak Varna	175	(49)
1991–1992	Beroe	24	(9)
1992–1994	Levski Sofia	32	(4)
1993	→ Cherno More (loan)	3	(1)
1995	Spartak Varna	23	(8)
1996–1997	Cherno More	30	(11)
1997–1998	Fakel Voronezh	15	(2)
1999	Haskovo	6	(0)
2000–2003	Vihar Valchi Dol	52	(23)
2003–2004	Aheloy	19	(6)
Total		379	(113)

International career
1986–1988	Bulgaria U21	22	(2)

Managerial career
- 2008–2010: Spartak Varna (Assistant)
- 2010–2011: Spartak Varna
- 2013: Kaliakra Kavarna (Assistant)
- 2013–2014: Kaliakra Kavarna
- 2019: Spartak Varna (interim)
- 2021–: Spartak Varna II
- * Club domestic league appearances and goals

Dimitar Trendafilov Vasilev (Bulgarian: Димитър Трендафилов Василев; born 25 February 1967) is a retired Bulgarian footballer and current manager of Spartak Varna II.

With the Bulgarian under-19 team Trendafilov played at the 1987 FIFA World Youth Championship in Chile.

== Honours ==
=== Club ===
- Levski Sofia
  - A PFG:
    - Winner: 1992-93, 1993-94
  - Bulgarian Cup:
    - Winner: 1993-94
