= Stefan Naydenov =

Bulgarian footballer

Personal information
- Date of birth: 16 August 1957
- Place of birth: Stubel, Montana, Bulgaria
- Date of death: 3 November 2010 (aged 53)
- Place of death: Stubel, Montana, Bulgaria
- Position: Attacking midfielder

Senior career*
| Years | Team | Apps | (Gls) |
| 1975–1977 | Septemvriyska Slava | 63 | (13) |
| 1977–1982 | Beroe | 102 | (21) |
| 1982–1990 | Spartak Varna | 207 | (59) |
| 1990–1991 | Cherno More | 27 | (0) |
| 1991–1993 | Spartak Varna | 32 | (2) |
| Total | | 431 | (95) |

International career
| 1982–1983 | Bulgaria | 6 | (1) |
- * Club domestic league appearances and goals

Stefan Naydenov (Bulgarian: Стефан Найденов; 16 August 1957 – 3 November 2010) was a Bulgarian footballer who played as an attacking midfielder, most notably for Spartak Varna. During his time with Spartak he was nicknamed Falcao by fans. He is the club's record goalscorer in the top league with 56 goals.

Naydenov played 6 times for the Bulgarian national team, scoring one goal.
