= 2003–04 A Group =

56th completed season of top-tier football league in Bulgaria

A Group
- Season: 2003–04
- Dates: 8 August 2003 – 15 May 2004
- Champions: Lokomotiv Plovdiv (1st title)
- Relegated: Botev Plovdiv; Makedonska slava; Chernomorets Burgas
- Champions League: Lokomotiv Plovdiv
- UEFA Cup: CSKA; Levski Sofia; Litex
- Intertoto Cup: Marek Dupnitsa
- Matches played: 240
- Goals scored: 686 (2.86 per match)
- Top goalscorer: Martin Kamburov (25 goals)
- Biggest home win: Lokomotiv Plovdiv 8–1 Cherno More Varna
- Biggest away win: Rodopa Smolyan 1–5 Lokomotiv Plovdiv; Belasitsa Petrich 0–4 CSKA; Makedonska slava 0–4 Lokomotiv Plovdiv
- Highest scoring: Lokomotiv Plovdiv 8–1 Cherno More Varna (9 goals)

The 2003–04 A Group was the 56th season of the top Bulgarian national football league (commonly referred to as A Group) and the 80th edition of a Bulgarian national championship tournament.

This is the first season since the revision of the league rules after an unsuccessful attempt for a creation of a so-called Premier Professional Football League.

== Overview ==
In the doorstep of the new millennium the Bulgarian Football Union decided to reform the football league system creating the Premier Professional Football League. The new top tier of Bulgarian football required all of its participants to be licensed as professional football clubs. The reforms also saw the number of teams reduced and introduced relegation play-offs during the years of its existence. The Bulgarian Premier League, however, was unsuccessful so from season 2003–04 the top Bulgarian league was re-established as the Bulgarian A Professional Football Group, returning to the traditions of A Republican Football Group and increasing the number of teams participating back to 16. Still, A Group retained the requirement of a professional status of all participants.

In the 2003–04 season Lokomotiv Plovdiv became champions for the first time in their history.

== Teams ==
A total of 16 clubs contested the league, including 12 from the previous season in the tier, and 4 promoted from the second flight.

As before the start of the season, the top flight of Bulgarian football was once again restructured and the number of participants in the league was increased back to the traditional 16 teams from 14 the previous season, there were no promotion play-offs for the right to participate in A Group that season. Instead after the end of season 2002–03 the last two teams in the top level – Dobrudzha Dobrich placed 13th, and Rilski Sportist Samokov placed 14th – were directly relegated to B Group.

The winners and the runners-up from the two divisions of B Group in season 2002–03 – Vidima-Rakovski and Rodopa Smolyan from the East division, and Belasitsa and Makedonska slava from the West division – were directly promoted to the top level of Bulgarian football. Vidima-Rakovski, Rodopa and Makedonska Slava all made their debut in the top tier, while Belasitsa Petrich returned after a one-year absence.

=== Stadia and Locations ===
Location of teams in 2003–04 A Group
Sofia 2003–04 A Group football clubs

Team	City	Stadium	Capacity
Belasitsa	Petrich	Tsar Samuil Stadium	9,500
Botev	Plovdiv	Hristo Botev Stadium	22,000
Cherno More	Varna	Ticha	12,000
Chernomorets	Burgas	Chernomorets	22,000
CSKA	Sofia	Balgarska Armia	22,015
Levski	Sofia	Georgi Asparuhov	29,986
Litex	Lovech	Lovech	7,050
Lokomotiv	Plovdiv	Lokomotiv (Plovdiv)	13,800
Lokomotiv	Sofia	Lokomotiv (Sofia)	22,000
Makedonska slava	Blagoevgrad	Hristo Botev	11,000
Marek	Dupnitsa	Bonchuk Stadium	16,050
Naftex	Burgas	Lazur	18,037
Rodopa	Smolyan	Septemvri	6,100
Slavia	Sofia	Ovcha Kupel	18,000
Spartak	Varna	Spartak Stadium	7,500
Vidima-Rakovski	Sevlievo	Rakovski	8,816

== League table ==
Pos	Team	Pld	W	D	L	GF	GA	GD	Pts	Qualification or relegation
1	Lokomotiv Plovdiv (C)	30	24	3	3	74	24	+50	75	Qualification for Champions League second qualifying round
2	Levski Sofia	30	22	6	2	59	16	+43	72	Qualification for UEFA Cup second qualifying round
3	CSKA Sofia	30	20	5	5	65	28	+37	65	Qualification for UEFA Cup second qualifying round
4	Litex Lovech	30	18	10	2	43	20	+23	64	Qualification for UEFA Cup second qualifying round
5	Slavia Sofia	30	18	3	9	57	30	+27	57	
6	Cherno More	30	10	8	12	45	53	−8	38 (Note: Cherno More ahead of Marek on head-to-head record; Cherno More–Marek 3–0, Marek–Cherno More 4–2.)	
7	Marek	30	12	2	16	33	50	−17	38	Qualification for Intertoto Cup second round
8	Naftex Burgas	30	9	8	13	49	38	+11	35	
9	Lokomotiv Sofia	30	8	9	13	37	48	−11	33 (Note: Lokomotiv Sofia ahead of Rodopa Smolyan on head-to-head away goals scored; Lokomotiv Sofia–Rodopa Smolyan 1–0, Rodopa Smolyan–Lokomotiv Sofia 2–1.)	
10	Rodopa Smolyan	30	10	3	17	28	47	−19	33	
11	Belasitsa Petrich	30	8	7	15	34	52	−18	31	
12	Vidima-Rakovski	30	6	12	12	32	48	−16	30 (Note: Vidima-Rakovski ahead of Spartak Varna on head-to-head record; Vidima-Rakovski–Spartak Varna 1–1, Spartak Varna–Vidima-Rakovski 1–2.)	
13	Spartak Varna	30	8	6	16	35	46	−11	30	
14	Botev Plovdiv (R)	30	7	6	17	33	60	−27	27	Relegation to 2004–05 B Group
15	Makedonska slava (R)	30	8	2	20	32	58	−26	26	Relegation to 2004–05 B Group
16	Chernomorets Burgas (R)	30	4	6	20	30	68	−38	18	Relegation to 2004–05 B Group

Source: A PFG (in Bulgarian)
Rules for classification: 1st points; 2nd head-to-head points; 3rd head-to-head goal difference; 4th head-to-head goals scored; 5th head-to-head away goals scored; 6th season goal difference; 7th season goals scored; 8th "sportsmanship" (R & Y cards); 9th draw
(C) Champions; (R) Relegated

== Results ==
Home \ Away	BEL	BOT	CHM	CHB	CSK	LEV	LIT	LPL	LSO	MKS	MAR	NAF	RSM	SLA	SPV	VRA
Belasitsa Petrich		3–0	3–1	1–0	0–4	0–1	1–1	1–2	2–0	2–2	2–1	0–3	3–0	2–2	3–0	2–2
Botev Plovdiv	1–0		3–4	1–1	3–1	1–2	1–1	0–0	0–1	2–1	0–2	0–3	1–0	2–1	0–0	1–1
Cherno More	0–0	3–1		2–2	3–0	0–0	1–2	1–2	2–2	2–0	3–0	2–2	1–0	0–3	1–1	4–1
Chernomorets Burgas	2–0	2–5	0–3		1–3	1–2	0–3	0–1	3–3	3–1	0–1	0–2	2–1	2–5	0–0	3–0
CSKA Sofia	5–1	4–1	2–0	3–0		1–2	1–1	1–1	3–0	4–1	4–0	2–1	1–0	2–1	2–0	3–1
Levski Sofia	4–2	3–1	0–0	3–0	1–1		1–1	3–0	3–0	6–0	3–0	3–0	3–0	1–0	2–0	2–0
Litex Lovech	1–0	0–0	2–0	3–0	0–0	1–0		2–1	3–1	0–0	2–0	1–1	1–0	1–0	2–1	2–2
Lokomotiv Plovdiv	2–0	3–2	8–1	6–0	3–1	3–1	3–1		3–1	1–0	4–1	2–0	2–0	3–2	1–0	2–0
Lokomotiv Sofia	5–2	0–1	3–2	1–1	0–1	1–1	0–1	0–0		1–0	1–1	3–1	1–0	2–2	3–0	1–1
Makedonska slava	1–3	4–3	3–4	3–2	0–2	1–2	1–2	0–4	1–0		4–0	2–1	1–0	3–0	1–0	0–0
Marek	0–0	1–0	4–2	1–0	0–3	0–1	1–2	0–3	2–1	3–0		3–0	2–0	1–2	1–2	1–0
Naftex Burgas	3–1	6–0	1–1	1–1	3–3	0–1	1–1	1–2	1–2	3–0	5–0		5–0	0–1	4–1	0–0
Rodopa Smolyan	2–0	2–1	2–0	3–0	1–3	2–1	1–2	1–5	2–1	1–0	1–0	1–0		1–3	1–1	1–1
Slavia Sofia	3–0	5–0	2–0	3–1	2–4	1–2	2–1	2–0	2–0	1–0	2–0	2–0	1–2		4–0	2–0
Spartak Varna	4–0	4–2	1–2	4–2	0–0	0–2	0–1	1–3	4–0	2–0	2–4	2–0	3–1	0–1		1–2
Vidima-Rakovski	0–0	2–0	3–0	3–1	0–1	0–3	0–2	1–4	3–3	3–2	1–3	1–1	3–2	0–0	1–1	

Source: A PFG (in Bulgarian)
Legend: Blue = home team win; Yellow = draw; Red = away team win.

== Champions ==
Lokomotiv Plovdiv

Goalkeepers
1	(Bulgaria) Vasil Kamburov	16	(0)
12	(Bulgaria) Rumen Popov	0	(0)
32	(Bulgaria) Krasimir Petkov	14	(0)

Defenders
2	(Bulgaria) Vladimir Ivanov	28	(1)
3	(Bulgaria) Aleksandar Tunchev	25	(1)
5	(Bulgaria) Georgi Petrov	2	(0)
6	(Bulgaria) Kiril Kotev	30	(3)
20	(Bulgaria) Ivan Paskov	20	(3)
22	(Bulgaria) Trayan Dyankov	1	(0)
24	(North Macedonia) Robert Petrov	29	(1)

Midfielders
4	(Bulgaria) Nedyalko Hubenov	6	(0)
7	(North Macedonia) Žarko Serafimovski*	4	(0)
10	(Bulgaria) Svetoslav Barkanichkov	10	(2)
14	(Bulgaria) Velko Hristev	5	(0)
16	(Bulgaria) Ivo Mihaylov	19	(2)
17	(North Macedonia) Vančo Trajanov	16	(0)
19	(Bulgaria) Krasimir Dimitrov	22	(1)
21	(Bulgaria) Georgi Iliev	27	(1)
25	(Serbia and Montenegro) Ivan Krizmanić	10	(0)
	(Bulgaria) Nesim Özgür*	6	(1)
	(Bulgaria) Atanas Georgiev*	2	(0)

Forwards
9	(North Macedonia) Boban Jančevski	21	(11)
11	(Bulgaria) Martin Kamburov	29	(25)
13	(Bulgaria) Metodi Stoynev	20	(3)
15	(Serbia and Montenegro) Neško Milovanović	10	(4)
18	(Bulgaria) Yavor Vandev	3	(0)
23	(Nigeria) Ekundayo Jayeoba	27	(9)
	(Serbia and Montenegro) Darko Spalević*	10	(4)

Manager
(Bulgaria) Eduard Eranosyan

- Serafimovski, Özgür, Georgiev and Spalević left the club during a season.

== Top scorers ==
Rank	Scorer	Club	Goals
1	(Bulgaria) Martin Kamburov	Lokomotiv Plovdiv	25
2	(Bulgaria) Stoyko Sakaliev	Naftex / CSKA	17
2	(Bulgaria) Blagoy Georgiev	Slavia Sofia	17
4	(Bulgaria) Georgi Chilikov	Levski Sofia	14
4	(Bulgaria) Emil Gargorov	CSKA Sofia	14
4	(Bulgaria) Doncho Donev	Lokomotiv Sofia	14
7	(North Macedonia) Boban Jančevski	Lokomotiv Plovdiv	11
7	(Bulgaria) Georgi Vladimirov	Slavia Sofia	11
7	(Romania) Eugen Trică	Litex Lovech	11
7	(Bulgaria) Hristo Yanev	CSKA Sofia	11
7	(Bulgaria) Plamen Krumov	Naftex Burgas	11
7	(Brazil) Vavá	Belasitsa Petrich	11
