= Ivan Trendafilov =

Bulgarian footballer

Personal information
- Position: Forward

International career
| Years | Team | Apps | (Gls) |
| 1950 | Bulgaria | 3 | (0) |

Ivan Trendafilov was a Bulgarian footballer. He played in three matches for the Bulgaria national football team in 1950. He was also part of Bulgaria's squad for the 1952 Summer Olympics, but he did not play in any matches.
