= Hristo Nikolov-Choko =

Bulgarian footballer

Hristo Nikolov-Choko (Bulgarian: Христо Николов-Чоко) (born 3 September 1939 in Varna) is a retired Bulgarian football player. Nikolov was a central forward. He played with PFC Spartak Varna and earned 167 caps in the Bulgarian first division, scoring 48 goals.
