= Zdravko Mitev =

Bulgarian footballer

Personal information
- Full name: Zdravko Kalev Mitev
- Date of birth: 29 October 1944 (age 82)
- Place of birth: Beloslav, Bulgaria
- Position: Forward

Senior career*
Years	Team	Apps	(Gls)
1962–1963	Vatev Beloslav	?	(?)
1964	Cherno More	6	(1)
1964–1965	Vatev Beloslav	28	(22)
1965–1976	Cherno More	261	(60)

International career
1965	Bulgaria U21	2	(0)
- * Club domestic league appearances and goals

Zdravko Mitev (Bulgarian: Здравко Митев; born 29 October 1944) is a Bulgarian former footballer who played as a forward for Cherno More Varna from 1964 to 1976. He played 267 matches in the top Bulgarian division and scored 61 goals.

== Career ==
Mitev played as a centre forward, two footed and hard to beat in the air. He appeared twice for the Bulgarian U21 and once for the "B" National teams. Mitev made his debut for The Sailors on 10 April 1964 in Dupnitza (then Stanke Dimitrov) against Marek (lost 2-1). On 8 June 1966 he scored twice in a friendly against the visitors from Ajax Amsterdam. Mitev holds Cherno More's overall record for most goals in a single match, scoring five times against Maritsa Plovdiv (8-0) in 1968. The next year, touring the Far East with the team from Varna, he scored 4 times in a friendly against Japan. The last years of his career were marred with injuries. Mitev played his last match in Varna on 26 October 1975, coming in as a second-half substitute in a 2–3 loss to Levski-Spartak.
