= Georgi Dimitrov (footballer, born 1931) =

Bulgarian footballer

Personal information
- Full name: Georgi Dimitrov Nikolov
- Date of birth: 1 May 1931
- Place of birth: Burgas, Bulgaria
- Date of death: 16 March 1978 (aged 46)
- Place of death: Gabare, Bulgaria
- Position: Forward

Senior career*
Years	Team	Apps	(Gls)
1948–1950	Chernomorets Burgas	9	(1)
1951–1954	Cherno More	81	(29)
1955–1959	CDNA Sofia	87	(26)
1959–1964	Cherno More	138	(35)

International career
1953–1958	Bulgaria	30	(7)

Managerial career
- 1964–1968: Cherno More (assistant)
- 1968–1972: Cherno More
- 1972: Bulgaria U21
- 1972–1974: Bulgaria (assistant)
- 1975–1976: Cherno More
- * Club domestic league appearances and goals

Georgi Dimitrov Nikolov (Bulgarian: Георги Димитров Николов; 1 May 1931 – 16 March 1978) was a Bulgarian footballer who played as a forward. Between 1953 and 1958, Dimitrov gained 30 caps for the Bulgaria national team and scored seven goals. He competed in the men's tournament at the 1956 Summer Olympics.

He died in a plane crash at the age of 46 in 1978.

== Honours ==
=== Club ===
CSKA Sofia

- Bulgarian League (5): 1955, 1956, 1957, 1958, 1958–59
- Bulgarian Cup: 1955

=== International ===
Bulgaria

- Olympic Bronze Medal: 1956
