= 1958 A Group =

14th season of top-tier football league in Bulgaria

A Group
- Season: 1958
- Champions: CSKA Sofia (8th title)
- Matches played: 66
- Goals scored: 192 (2.91 per match)
- Top goalscorer: Dobromir Tashkov; Georgi Arnaudov; (9 goals each)

The 1958 A Group was the tenth season of the A Football Group, the top Bulgarian professional league for association football clubs, since its establishment in 1948.

== Overview ==
It was contested by 12 teams, and CSKA Sofia won the championship for the fourth time in a row.

== League standings ==
Pos	Team	Pld	W	D	L	GF	GA	GD	Pts
1	CSKA Sofia (C)	11	7	4	0	19	9	+10	18
2	Levski Sofia	11	6	2	3	18	9	+9	14
3	Spartak Pleven	11	5	4	2	12	9	+3	14
4	Lokomotiv Sofia	11	4	4	3	17	17	0	12
5	Slavia Sofia	11	5	1	5	23	17	+6	11
6	Spartak Plovdiv	11	3	5	3	18	16	+2	11
7	Minyor Pernik	11	5	1	5	20	19	+1	11
8	Spartak Varna	11	4	2	5	19	18	+1	10
9	Botev Plovdiv	11	3	3	5	14	18	−4	9
10	Beroe Stara Zagora	11	3	2	6	13	19	−6	8
11	Dunav Ruse	11	2	4	5	11	19	−8	8
12	Cherno More Varna	11	3	0	8	8	22	−14	6

Source: rsssf.com
(C) Champions

Note: A decision is taken to move from a spring-fall, to a fall-spring calendar. Because of this a transitional half-season took place in spring 1958. The teams met each other only once. Because of this no relegation or promotion took place.

== Results ==
Home \ Away	BSZ	BPD	CHM	CSK	DUN	LEV	LSO	MIN	SLA	SPL	SPD	SPV
Beroe Stara Zagora		3–2	1–2	0–1		2–0	1–1	2–0				
Botev Plovdiv			3–0	0–1	0–0		1–0		4–4			
Cherno More									1–0			
CSKA Sofia			4–0		1–0	2–2			2–1	2–2		2–1
Dunav Ruse	3–2		2–0				1–1		0–1			
Levski Sofia		2–0	0–1		4–1		0–1	3–0	3–0	1–0	2–2	1–0
Lokomotiv Sofia			2–0	1–1				4–3	1–3		3–0	
Minyor Pernik		4–0	4–2	0–1	1–0							1–1
Slavia Sofia	6–0							1–2			2–1	5–2
Spartak Pleven	2–1	1–0	2–1		1–1		1–1	1–2	1–0		0–0	1–0
Spartak Plovdiv	0–0	2–2	1–0	2–2	6–1			4–3				0–1
Spartak Varna	2–1	1–2	3–1		2–2		6–2					

Source: A PFG (in Bulgarian)
Legend: Blue = home team win; Yellow = draw; Red = away team win.

== Champions ==
CSKA Sofia

Goalkeepers
(Bulgaria) Georgi Naydenov	11	(0)
(Bulgaria) Hristo Andonov	0	(0)

Defenders
(Bulgaria) Kiril Rakarov	8	(0)
(Bulgaria) Georgi Enisheynov	4	(0)
(Bulgaria) Manol Manolov	11	(0)
(Bulgaria) Nikola Kovachev	10	(0)

Midfielders
(Bulgaria) Gavril Stoyanov	7	(0)
(Bulgaria) Stefan Bozhkov	9	(0)
(Bulgaria) Petar Aleksiev	7	(0)

Forwards
(Bulgaria) Krum Yanev	8	(5)
(Bulgaria) Dimitar Milanov	9	(5)
(Bulgaria) Bogomil Martinov	5	(0)
(Bulgaria) Georgi Dimitrov	10	(1)
(Bulgaria) Ivan Kolev	11	(2)
(Bulgaria) Stefan Stefanov	2	(1)
(Bulgaria) Petar Mihaylov	2	(0)
(Bulgaria) Panayot Panayotov	9	(3)

Manager
(Bulgaria) Krum Milev

== Top scorers ==
Rank	Scorer	Club	Goals
1	(Bulgaria) Dobromir Tashkov	Slavia Sofia	9
1	(Bulgaria) Georgi Arnaudov	Spartak Varna	9
3	(Bulgaria) Todor Diev	Spartak Plovdiv	8
4	(Bulgaria) Hristo Iliev	Levski Sofia	7
4	(Bulgaria) Oleg Pavlov	Minyor Pernik	7
6	(Bulgaria) Ivan Danchev	Minyor Pernik	6
