= 1983–84 A Group =

40th season of top-tier football league in Bulgaria

A Group
- Season: 1983–84
- Champions: Levski Sofia (15th title)
- Relegated: Lokomotiv Plovdiv, Haskovo
- European Cup: Levski Sofia
- UEFA Cup: CSKA Sofia; Sliven
- Matches played: 240
- Goals scored: 683 (2.85 per match)
- Top goalscorer: Eduard Eranosyan (19 goals)

The 1983–84 A Group was the 36th season of the A Football Group, the top Bulgarian professional league for association football clubs, since its establishment in 1948.

== Overview ==
It was contested by 16 teams, and Levski Sofia won the championship. In addition, Levski became the first Bulgarian club to win a treble this season.

== League standings ==
Pos	Team	Pld	W	D	L	GF	GA	GD	Pts	Qualification or relegation
1	Levski Sofia (C)	30	19	9	2	64	29	+35	47	Qualification for European Cup first round
2	CSKA Sofia	30	18	9	3	72	24	+48	45	Qualification for UEFA Cup first round
3	Spartak Varna	30	13	5	12	41	37	+4	31	
4	Beroe Stara Zagora	30	11	9	10	38	40	−2	31	
5	Chernomorets Burgas	30	12	7	11	43	47	−4	31	
6	Lokomotiv Sofia	30	11	8	11	35	29	+6	30	
7	Sliven	30	10	10	10	39	37	+2	30	Qualification for UEFA Cup first round
8	Botev Vratsa	30	10	10	10	31	32	−1	30	
9	Trakia Plovdiv	30	11	7	12	64	58	+6	29	Qualification for Cup Winners' Cup first round (Note: Trakia Plovdiv qualified for Cup Winners' Cup as a finalists in the 1983–84 Bulgarian Cup)
10	Etar Veliko Tarnovo	30	13	2	15	47	48	−1	28	
11	Shumen	30	11	5	14	35	46	−11	27	
12	Belasitsa Petrich	30	11	5	14	25	49	−24	27	
13	Cherno More Varna	30	9	8	13	36	43	−7	26	
14	Slavia Sofia	30	10	5	15	40	38	+2	25	
15	Lokomotiv Plovdiv (R)	30	10	4	16	43	63	−20	24	Relegation to 1984–85 B Group
16	Haskovo (R)	30	7	5	18	30	63	−33	19	Relegation to 1984–85 B Group

Source: rsssf.com
(C) Champions; (R) Relegated

== Results ==
Home \ Away	BEL	BSZ	BVR	CHM	CHB	CSK	ETA	HAS	LEV	LPL	LSO	SHU	SLA	SLI	SPV	TRA
Belasitsa Petrich		3–2	2–0	0–0	2–1	1–1	1–0	1–0	1–1	1–0	1–0	0–2	1–0	2–1	2–1	1–1
Beroe Stara Zagora	2–1		1–1	1–1	3–1	1–1	3–2	3–1	1–2	3–2	0–0	2–1	1–0	1–0	2–0	3–1
Botev Vratsa	0–0	2–0		0–2	1–0	0–0	2–0	2–0	1–2	4–1	3–0	1–0	0–0	0–3	2–0	2–1
Cherno More	2–1	3–0	1–1		3–4	0–3	0–1	4–0	0–0	3–1	1–4	5–1	1–0	0–0	0–2	2–2
Chernomorets Burgas	2–0	0–1	0–0	2–0		1–1	2–1	4–0	1–1	5–1	1–0	2–0	1–0	2–0	1–1	2–2
CSKA Sofia	6–0	2–2	3–1	3–0	7–0		1–0	4–0	1–3	8–2	1–0	3–1	2–0	6–1	5–0	3–2
Etar Veliko Tarnovo	2–0	2–0	1–1	3–0	5–0	1–3		2–0	1–0	3–1	1–0	4–1	3–1	1–0	1–2	3–2
Haskovo	2–0	2–2	0–0	1–0	2–2	0–1	1–1		2–1	1–2	2–0	1–0	0–1	0–0	3–1	4–3
Levski Sofia	5–1	2–1	2–1	4–1	1–1	2–0	5–3	2–0		3–2	2–2	3–0	1–0	3–0	2–1	4–1
Lokomotiv Plovdiv	1–0	3–0	1–1	0–0	1–0	4–2	4–1	3–2	0–3		1–0	2–0	1–0	0–1	3–3	1–2
Lokomotiv Sofia	2–1	0–0	2–1	1–2	3–0	0–0	2–0	3–0	1–2	1–0		2–0	2–1	1–1	2–0	2–0
Shumen	2–0	1–0	1–1	3–1	3–0	0–0	3–1	3–1	2–2	4–1	2–1		1–1	1–0	1–0	1–1
Slavia Sofia	0–2	2–2	3–1	1–2	1–2	0–1	2–0	7–1	0–2	3–1	1–1	3–0		3–0	2–1	6–3
Sliven	3–0	1–1	3–0	0–0	2–3	1–1	3–1	4–1	2–2	2–2	2–2	1–0	4–0		1–0	2–0
Spartak Varna	3–0	2–0	2–0	2–1	2–1	0–0	4–2	2–0	0–0	3–0	2–0	1–0	1–1	1–2		3–1
Trakia Plovdiv	7–0	1–0	3–0	2–1	3–2	1–3	4–1	5–3	2–2	4–2	1–1	6–1	0–1	1–1	2–1	

Source: A PFG (in Bulgarian)
Legend: Blue = home team win; Yellow = draw; Red = away team win.

== Champions ==
Levski Sofia

Goalkeepers
(Bulgaria) Borislav Mihaylov	30	(0)
(Bulgaria) Vlado Delchev	3	(0)

Defenders
(Bulgaria) Lyuben Kolev	1	(0)
(Bulgaria) Nikolay Iliev	28	(0)
(Bulgaria) Krasimir Koev	16	(0)
(Bulgaria) Plamen Nikolov	26	(1)
(Bulgaria) Veselin Balevski	16	(0)
(Bulgaria) Stoil Georgiev	1	(0)
(Bulgaria) Stoyko Parpulov	0	(0)
(Bulgaria) Petar Petrov	29	(0)

Midfielders
(Bulgaria) Emil Velev	21	(3)
(Bulgaria) Krasimir Chavdarov	27	(3)
(Bulgaria) Grigor Grigorov	9	(1)
(Bulgaria) Plamen Tsvetkov	21	(5)
(Bulgaria) Bozhidar Iskrenov	29	(7)
(Bulgaria) Rusi Gochev	21	(4)

Forwards
(Bulgaria) Emil Spasov	30	(16)
(Bulgaria) Nasko Sirakov	17	(2)
(Bulgaria) Hristo Denchev	4	(0)
(Bulgaria) Mihail Valchev	28	(13)
(Bulgaria) Petar Kurdov	26	(9)

Manager
(Bulgaria) Vasil Metodiev

== Top scorers ==
Rank	Scorer	Club	Goals
1	(Bulgaria) Eduard Eranosyan	Lokomotiv Plovdiv	19
2	(Bulgaria) Stoycho Mladenov	CSKA Sofia	18
3	(Bulgaria) Nikola Spasov	Cherno More	17
3	(Bulgaria) Spas Dzhevizov	CSKA Sofia	17
3	(Bulgaria) Georgi Slavkov	CSKA Sofia	17
6	(Bulgaria) Emil Spasov	Levski Sofia	16
7	(Bulgaria) Kostadin Kostadinov	Trakia Plovdiv	15
8	(Bulgaria) Georgi Madzharov	Chernomorets Burges	14
9	(Bulgaria) Krasimir Manolov	Shumen	13
9	(Bulgaria) Mihail Valchev	Levski Sofia	13
9	(Bulgaria) Vladimir Stoyanov	Chernomorets Burges	13
12	(Bulgaria) Boycho Velichkov	Lokomotiv Sofia	12
12	(Bulgaria) Petar Aleksandrov	Slavia Sofia	12
12	(Bulgaria) Stefan Naydenov	JSK Spartak Varna	12

== Attendances ==
#	Football club	Average attendance
1	Volov Shumen	21,600
2	Trakia Plovdiv	14,233
3	Lokomotiv Plovdiv	14,143
4	CSKA Sofia	13,033
5	Beroe Stara Zagora	11,400
6	FC Sliven	10,867
7	Chernomorets Burgas	10,167
8	Levski Sofia	9,875
9	Etar Veliko Tarnovo	9,000
10	Spartak Varna	8,233
11	FC Haskovo	7,467
12	Belasitsa Petrich	6,900
13	Lokomotiv Sofia	6,333
14	Cherno More Varna	6,300
15	Botev Vratsa	6,263
16	Slavia Sofia	4,949
