= OFC Spartak Pleven =

Bulgarian football club

Spartak Pleven
- Full name: Municipal Football Club Spartak 1919 Pleven
- Founded: 10 September 1919; 107 years ago
- Ground: Stadion Pleven, Pleven
- Capacity: 25,000 (3,000 seats)
- Chairman: Evgeni Genov
- Coach: Krasimir Bislimov
- League: Second League
- 2025–26: Second League, 12th of 17
- Website: spartak-pleven.bg
Home colours	Away colours

OFK Spartak (Bulgarian: ОФК Спартак) is a Bulgarian municipal association football club from the city of Pleven founded on 10 September 1919. It currently competes in the Second League, the second tier of Bulgarian football. The team's greatest achievements are the Bulgarian Cup final in 1957 and the third place in the Bulgarian Championship during the following season.

Spartak Pleven made its debut in the A Group during the 1952 A Group season. Spartak established itself as one of the most consistent teams in the Bulgarian A Group, only missing five seasons of top flight football between 1952 and 1988. However, after 1989, Spartak began gradually declining, mostly due to financial constraints, with the club only managing to play three top flight seasons since then, most recently during the 2001–02 season.

== History ==
Spartak Pleven was created in 1919, by a student from Pleven, Dragomir Nestorov. He along with a couple of friends founded the club under the name "Skobelov".

The year 1931 remains important for the club's history. This is because then the club changed its name to "Belite Orli". In 1941, the club was given their first ground by the Pleven municipality.

Things began to change in 1944, when the new government in Bulgaria began to interfere in sports as well. In 1946, it was decided that Belite Orli should be renamed to "Republikanec". However, the fans of the club were against the new name and in a meeting, it was decided to change the team's name to "Spartak Pleven", which it still carries today. In 1949, other football teams began to appear in the city, such as "Lokomotiv" and "General Vinarov". However, it was decided that all the teams should be united into one, strong team, so the name "Septemvri" was given to the new team. The team even managed to promote to the elite the same year. However, less than a year later, it was decided that Spartak Pleven would separate and act as a club on its own.

It was decided that there would be a qualifying tournament for the club's in Pleven to decide which team would participate on a professional level. Torpedo Pleven won that tournament and went to A PFG, while Spartak would start from the regional groups. However, the team quickly managed to promote back to professional football, gaining a place in the Bulgarian elite by 1951. Beginning in 1952, Spartak became a consistent member of the Bulgarian top tier. In 1958, Spartak achieved its greatest success, finishing third. Only two seasons later, however, Spartak was relegated, ending a nine-year stay in the A Group.

It didn't take long for Spartak to return to the top level. The team finished first in the 1961 B Group, thus promoting back after just one year in the second level. The next five seasons were spent in the A Group, although a 7th-place finish was the most that Spartak could achieve. In 1966, the team was relegated again to the B Group. Spartak was again among the best teams in the second level, finishing first once more in 1967, thus returning to A Group.

Beginning in the 1967–68 season, Spartak managed another nine-year stay in the A Group. This period wasn't however remembered for any significant results, as two nine-placed finishes in 1971 and 1975 were the best the team could achieve. Another relegation followed at the end of the 1976–77 season. This time it took two seasons for Spartak to return to the A Group.

The next five seasons were spent in the A Group. Although Spartak managed to produce some noteworthy results, the club was also involved in bribery schemes with other teams from the elite, which resulted in an administrative relegation in 1983. Spartak originally finished 5th. The team managed to recover quickly though, returning to the A Group after just one year. Spartak managed to remain in the top level for four more seasons, although it mostly placed towards the bottom of the table, eventually relegating after the 1987–88 A Group season.

The next eight years were spent outside the top level. Spartak was in serious danger of relegating to the third tier on some occasions, such as the 1989–90 season, when Spartak finished 12th. Spartak eventually began improving its performance in the upcoming years, eventually managing to earn promotion back to the A Group at the end of the 1995–96 season. Spartak only managed to stay two years in the top level, again dropping to the second level after the 1997–98 A Group. It took three years for Spartak to again regain its status in the top level. The 2001–02 A Group season ended in relegation, however.

To date, the 2001-02 season remains the last one for Spartak in the A Group. Since then, Spartak Pleven has been bouncing between the second and third tiers.

The record low came in 2009, when the club declared bankruptcy. This led to Spartak being reformed and started playing from the amateur leagues. In 2012, Spartak returned to the second level, but an immediate relegation followed. Another promotion to the B Group came in 2015, but again this was short-lived, with relegation coming in 2017.

At the end of the 2018–19 season, Spartak finished first in the North-West third league and managed to gain promotion to the second tier for the 2019-20 season. The team, however, experienced difficulties in the second tier, both financially and performance wise. Spartak largely remained in the relegation zone, struggling to survive. They were even deducted three points for not showing on a game. In May 2020, the Bulgarian Football Union decided to cancel the remainder of the season due to the coronavirus epidemic outbreak in Bulgaria. At the time, Spartak was in 16th place (second to last), which meant relegation to the third tier, after just one year in the second league.

After two seasons in the Third League, Spartak returned to the second level as champions of the 2021-22 Northwest Third League.

== Honours ==
- First League:
  - Third place: 1958
- Bulgarian Cup:
  - Runners-up: 1957
- Second League:
  - Winners (5): 1960–61, 1966–67, 1977–78, 1983–84, 2000–01
- Third League:
  - Winners (4): 2011–12, 2014–15, 2018–19, 2021–22

== Players ==
As of 26 June 2026

Note: Flags indicate national team as defined under FIFA eligibility rules; some limited exceptions apply. Players may hold more than one non-FIFA nationality.

No.	Pos.	Nation	Player
4	MF	BUL	Martin Trifonov
6	MF	BUL	Viktor Ivanov
8	DF	BUL	Rosen Marinov
9	FW	BUL	Aleks Ignatov
10	MF	BUL	Vasil Shopov
11	FW	BUL	Hristian Petkov
14	MF	BRA	Cleiton Thiesen
16	DF	BUL	Ivan Ivanov
17	FW	BUL	Georgi Dimitrov
18	MF	BUL	Mishel Tairov
19	DF	BUL	Yani Pehlivanov
20	DF	BUL	Plamen Spasov

No.	Pos.	Nation	Player
21	DF	BUL	Kostadin Velchev
22	FW	BUL	Aleksandar Kozhuharov
23	FW	BRA	Lucas Macedo (on loan from Guarani)
24	FW	NGR	Shola Adelani (on loan from Botev Plovdiv)
25	FW	BUL	Preslav Antonov
26	DF	BUL	Daniel Stoyanov
27	DF	STP	Adjeil Neves
29	MF	BUL	Antonio Georgiev
30	GK	UKR	Ilarion Tuhai
66	MF	BUL	Slav Petkov
99	GK	BUL	Petar Petrov

For recent transfers, see Transfers summer 2025 and Transfers winter 2025–26.

== Past seasons ==
Season	Level	League	Place	W	D	L	GF	GA	Pts	Bulgarian Cup
2009–10	IV	A Regional Group	2	18	5	3	75	26	59	not qualified
2010–11	III	V Group	5	15	6	9	49	27	51	not qualified
2011–12	III	V Group	1	27	2	1	111	10	83	Third round
2012–13	II	B Group	6*	11	9	6	33	25	42	Second round
2013–14	III	V Group	4	20	5	5	66	27	65	not qualified
2014–15	III	V Group	1	23	2	1	92	8	71	not qualified
2015–16	II	B Group	13	9	9	12	35	42	36	Second round
2016–17	II	Second League	14	9	6	15	44	52	33	First round
2017–18	III	Third League	8	10	9	11	39	46	39	not qualified
2018–19	III	Third League	1	26	1	3	75	11	79	not qualified
Green marks a season followed by promotion, red a season followed by relegation.

== European Record ==
=== Matches ===
Season	Competition	Round	Club	Home	Away	Aggregate
1964–65	Intertoto Cup					
1964–65	Intertoto Cup	Group Stage	(East Germany) Karl–Marx–Stadt	0–0	2–6	4th
1964–65	Intertoto Cup	Group Stage	(Czechoslovakia) Tatran Prešov	2–2	0–0	4th
1964–65	Intertoto Cup	Group Stage	(Poland) Odra Opole	1–1	0–2	4th
1981	Intertoto Cup	Group Stage				
1981	Intertoto Cup	Group Stage	(Germany) Werder Bremen	2–3	0–1	3rd
1981	Intertoto Cup	Group Stage	(Sweden) Malmö	2–0	1–3	3rd
1981	Intertoto Cup	Group Stage	(Switzerland) Zürich	4–1	0–3	3rd

== Notable stats ==
Most First League apps:

#	Name	Matches
1	(Bulgaria) Pusho Dimitrov	301
2	(Bulgaria) Krasimir Lazarov	257
3	(Bulgaria) Pavel Chelestinov	256
4	(Bulgaria) Sasho Varbanov	253
5	(Bulgaria) Petar Boyanov	251
6	(Bulgaria) Petko Todorov	244
7	(Bulgaria) Stoyan Zdravkov	220
8	(Bulgaria) Boris Novachev	204
9	(Bulgaria) Dimcho Dimov	204
10	(Bulgaria) Vencho Sabotinov	203

Most First League goals:

#	Name	Goals	
1	(Bulgaria) Plamen Getov	108	
2	(Bulgaria) Sasho Varbanov	75	
3	(Bulgaria) Stoyan Zdravkov	64	
4	(Bulgaria) Pavel Chelestinov	56	
5	(Bulgaria) Krasimir Lazarov	40	
6	(Bulgaria) Petar Boyanov	25	
7	(Bulgaria) Vasil Minkov	25	
8	(Bulgaria) Blagoi Krastanov	24	
9	(Bulgaria) Milen Goranov	24	
10	(Bulgaria) Petar Kostov	20	–
