= 1987–88 A Group =

40th completed season of top-tier football league in Bulgaria

Bulgarian A Group
- Season: 1987–88
- Champions: Levski Sofia (17th title)
- Relegated: Chernomorets; Spartak Pleven
- European Cup: Levski Sofia
- UEFA Cup: Trakia Plovdiv; Slavia Sofia
- Matches: 240
- Goals: 695 (2.9 per match)
- Top goalscorer: Nasko Sirakov (28 goals)

The 1987–88 A Group was the 40th season of the A Football Group, the top Bulgarian professional league for association football clubs, since its establishment in 1948. The championship was won by Levski Sofia, two points ahead of CSKA Sofia. Chernomorets Burgas and Spartak Pleven were relegated.

== League standings ==
| Pos | Team | Pld | W | D | L | GF | GA | GD | Pts | Qualification or relegation |
|---|---|---|---|---|---|---|---|---|---|---|
| 1 | Levski Sofia (C) | 30 | 20 | 8 | 2 | 67 | 29 | +38 | 48 | Qualification for European Cup first round |
| 2 | CSKA Sofia | 30 | 20 | 6 | 4 | 76 | 32 | +44 | 46 | Qualification for Cup Winners' Cup first round |
| 3 | Trakia Plovdiv | 30 | 15 | 9 | 6 | 52 | 31 | +21 | 39 | Qualification for UEFA Cup first round |
| 4 | Slavia Sofia | 30 | 14 | 10 | 6 | 48 | 30 | +18 | 38 | Qualification for UEFA Cup first round |
| 5 | Lokomotiv Sofia | 30 | 12 | 8 | 10 | 47 | 47 | 0 | 32 | |
| 6 | Beroe Stara Zagora | 30 | 11 | 7 | 12 | 41 | 44 | −3 | 29 | |
| 7 | Lokomotiv Plovdiv | 30 | 12 | 4 | 14 | 44 | 59 | −15 | 28 | |
| 8 | Sliven | 30 | 11 | 5 | 14 | 35 | 43 | −8 | 27 | |
| 9 | Etar Veliko Tarnovo | 30 | 10 | 6 | 14 | 44 | 41 | +3 | 26 | |
| 10 | Spartak Varna | 30 | 10 | 6 | 14 | 36 | 52 | −16 | 26 | |
| 11 | Minyor Pernik | 30 | 10 | 5 | 15 | 34 | 36 | −2 | 25 | |
| 12 | Pirin Blagoevgrad | 30 | 7 | 11 | 12 | 32 | 37 | −5 | 25 | |
| 13 | Lokomotiv G. Oryahovitsa | 30 | 11 | 3 | 16 | 41 | 57 | −16 | 25 | |
| 14 | Vratsa | 30 | 8 | 8 | 14 | 34 | 46 | −12 | 24 | |
| 15 | Chernomorets Burgas (R) | 30 | 9 | 3 | 18 | 27 | 50 | −23 | 21 | Relegation to 1988–89 B Group |
| 16 | Spartak Pleven (R) | 30 | 6 | 9 | 15 | 37 | 61 | −24 | 21 | Relegation to 1988–89 B Group |

Source: rsssf.com
(C) Champions; (R) Relegated

== Results ==
| Home \ Away | BSZ | CHB | CSK | ETA | LEV | LGO | LPL | LSO | MIN | PIR | SLA | SLI | SPL | SPV | TRA | VRA |
|---|---|---|---|---|---|---|---|---|---|---|---|---|---|---|---|---|
| Beroe Stara Zagora | | 1–0 | 2–3 | 2–1 | 0–1 | 1–0 | 1–1 | 2–0 | 3–1 | 1–1 | 0–1 | 3–0 | 3–3 | 4–1 | 1–1 | 1–4 |
| Chernomorets Burgas | 0–1 | | 0–1 | 1–1 | 2–1 | 4–0 | 0–1 | 0–2 | 2–0 | 0–0 | 2–0 | 2–1 | 3–0 | 0–0 | 0–3 | 0–1 |
| CSKA Sofia | 4–2 | 8–0 | | 1–0 | 2–3 | 4–0 | 7–0 | 4–0 | 1–0 | 1–0 | 2–2 | 4–3 | 5–1 | 2–1 | 1–0 | 2–0 |
| Etar Veliko Tarnovo | 2–1 | 3–0 | 3–3 | | 3–1 | 1–1 | 3–1 | 3–1 | 1–1 | 1–1 | 1–1 | 2–0 | 5–1 | 3–0 | 3–0 | 3–2 |
| Levski Sofia | 2–2 | 2–0 | 2–2 | 1–0 | | 3–0 | 5–1 | 5–3 | 2–0 | 3–1 | 0–0 | 3–0 | 2–0 | 6–1 | 1–0 | 4–2 |
| Lokomotiv G. Oryahovitsa | 4–1 | 3–2 | 2–5 | 1–0 | 1–2 | | 2–0 | 3–2 | 2–0 | 1–1 | 2–1 | 1–0 | 1–3 | 2–0 | 2–1 | 2–0 |
| Lokomotiv Plovdiv | 1–2 | 2–1 | 3–0 | 3–2 | 1–1 | 4–3 | | 3–0 | 2–0 | 2–1 | 2–4 | 1–0 | 3–2 | 5–2 | 2–5 | 4–0 |
| Lokomotiv Sofia | 1–1 | 4–2 | 2–2 | 1–0 | 1–3 | 3–1 | 1–1 | | 1–1 | 3–1 | 1–0 | 1–1 | 2–0 | 3–2 | 1–2 | 2–0 |
| Minyor Pernik | 1–0 | 3–0 | 0–2 | 1–0 | 0–1 | 3–1 | 2–0 | 0–2 | | 4–1 | 1–1 | 2–0 | 3–0 | 3–0 | 1–1 | 4–0 |
| Pirin Blagoevgrad | 0–1 | 1–2 | 0–2 | 1–0 | 2–2 | 2–1 | 4–0 | 1–1 | 2–0 | | 3–0 | 0–0 | 3–0 | 2–0 | 1–1 | 1–1 |
| Slavia Sofia | 2–0 | 4–0 | 1–3 | 2–0 | 2–2 | 5–2 | 2–0 | 0–0 | 3–1 | 1–0 | | 2–0 | 0–0 | 2–0 | 2–2 | 4–1 |
| Sliven | 1–1 | 3–0 | 2–1 | 3–2 | 0–4 | 1–0 | 3–0 | 1–2 | 1–0 | 2–0 | 2–1 | | 4–3 | 4–1 | 1–1 | 0–0 |
| Spartak Pleven | 2–4 | 1–2 | 1–1 | 1–0 | 1–1 | 2–1 | 3–1 | 2–1 | 3–1 | 0–0 | 0–1 | 0–1 | | 2–2 | 3–3 | 0–0 |
| Spartak Varna | 2–0 | 1–0 | 0–2 | 3–1 | 1–1 | 2–0 | 1–0 | 0–3 | 1–1 | 3–0 | 0–0 | 2–0 | 4–1 | | 0–0 | 3–1 |
| Trakia Plovdiv | 3–0 | 2–1 | 1–0 | 3–0 | 0–1 | 3–1 | 0–0 | 5–2 | 1–0 | 3–1 | 1–1 | 2–1 | 3–1 | 1–2 | | 2–0 |
| Vratsa | 1–0 | 0–1 | 1–1 | 3–0 | 1–2 | 1–1 | 2–0 | 1–1 | 2–0 | 1–1 | 2–3 | 2–0 | 1–1 | 3–1 | 1–2 | |

Source: A PFG (in Bulgarian)
Legend: Blue = home team win; Yellow = draw; Red = away team win.

== Champions ==
Levski Sofia

Goalkeepers
| (Bulgaria) Borislav Mihaylov | 24 | (0) |
| (Bulgaria) Vlado Delchev | 6 | (0) |

Defenders
| (Bulgaria) Kiril Vangelov | 17 | (0) |
| (Bulgaria) Nikolay Iliev | 30 | (1) |
| (Bulgaria) Krasimir Koev | 30 | (1) |
| (Bulgaria) Plamen Nikolov | 11 | (0) |
| (Bulgaria) Dinko Gospodinov | 15 | (0) |
| (Bulgaria) Stoil Georgiev | 27 | (0) |
| (Bulgaria) Stefan Kolev | 6 | (0) |
| (Bulgaria) Petar Petrov | 23 | (2) |

Midfielders
| (Bulgaria) Emil Velev | 29 | (1) |
| (Bulgaria) Dimitar Markov | 9 | (0) |
| (Bulgaria) Georgi Yordanov | 30 | (10) |
| (Bulgaria) Sasho Nachev | 11 | (1) |
| (Bulgaria) Bozhidar Iskrenov | 27 | (6) |
| (Bulgaria) Georgi Slavchev | 5 | (1) |

Forwards
| (Bulgaria) Emil Spasov | 18 | (2) |
| (Bulgaria) Nasko Sirakov | 30 | (28) |
| (Bulgaria) Rosen Krumov | 16 | (0) |
| (Bulgaria) Georgi Donkov | 1 | (0) |
| (Bulgaria) Petar Kurdov | 22 | (13) |

Manager
| (Bulgaria) Vasil Metodiev |

== Top scorers ==
| Rank | Scorer | Club | Goals |
|---|---|---|---|
| 1 | (Bulgaria) Nasko Sirakov | Levski Sofia | 28 |
| 2 | (Bulgaria) Lyuboslav Penev | CSKA Sofia | 21 |
| 3 | (Bulgaria) Ivelin Mladenov | Etar Veliko Tarnovo | 18 |
| 4 | (Bulgaria) Atanas Pashev | Trakia Plovdiv | 17 |
| 5 | (Bulgaria) Petar Aleksandrov | Slavia Sofia | 16 |
| 6 | (Bulgaria) Hristo Stoichkov | CSKA Sofia | 14 |
| 6 | (Bulgaria) Petar Kurdov | Levski Sofia | 14 |
| 6 | (Bulgaria) Emil Kostadinov | CSKA Sofia | 14 |
| 9 | (Bulgaria) Vasil Dragolov | Beroe | 13 |
| (Bulgaria) Vasil Dragolov | Beroe | | |
| 10 | (Bulgaria) Yordan Lechkov | Sliven | 12 |
| 10 | (Bulgaria) Stefan Draganov | Lokomotiv Plovdiv | 12 |

== Attendances ==
| # | Club | Average |
|---|---|---|
| 1 | Levski | 14,500 |
| 2 | Lokomotiv Plovdiv | 13,200 |
| 3 | Trakia | 12,600 |
| 4 | Pleven | 11,600 |
| 5 | Lokomotiv GO | 11,533 |
| 6 | CSKA Sofia | 11,000 |
| 7 | Minyor | 10,567 |
| 8 | Beroe | 9,267 |
| 9 | Sliven | 8,133 |
| 10 | Etar | 7,933 |
| 11 | Pirin | 7,600 |
| 12 | Slavia Sofia | 7,453 |
| 13 | Varna | 7,400 |
| 14 | Lokomotiv Sofia | 7,200 |
| 15 | Chernomorets | 7,167 |
| 16 | Botev | 5,967 |
