= Ivan Kolev (footballer, born 1930) =

Bulgarian footballer and coach

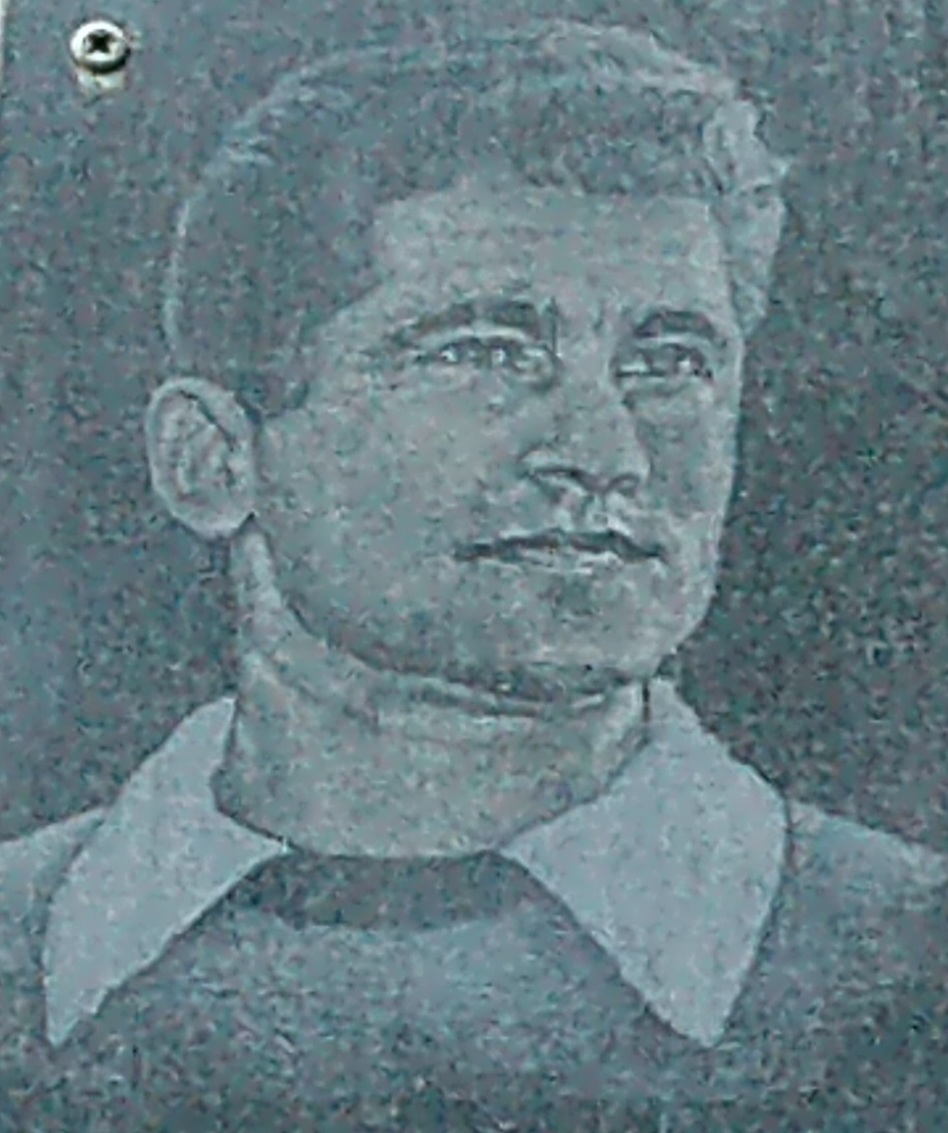

Personal information
- Full name: Ivan Petkov Kolev
- Date of birth: 1 November 1930
- Place of birth: Plovdiv, Bulgaria
- Date of death: 1 July 2005 (aged 74)
- Position: Forward

Senior career*
Years	Team	Apps	(Gls)
1945–1948	Sportist Sofia		
1949–1950	VVS Sofia		
1957–1967	CSKA Sofia	304	(90)
1967–1968	Sliven		

International career
1950–1966	Bulgaria	75	(25)
- * Club domestic league appearances and goals

Olympic medal record

Men's Football

Representing Bulgaria
Bronze medal – third place	1956 Melbourne	Team competition

Ivan Petkov Kolev (Bulgarian: Иван Петков Колев; 1 November 1930 – 1 July 2005) was a Bulgarian football player and coach.

He represented Bulgaria at both the 1962 FIFA World Cup and the 1966 FIFA World Cup, He also played for the Bulgarian Olympic team and won a bronze medal at the 1956 Summer Olympics.

Kolev played for Sportist Sofia from 1945 to 1948, VVS Sofia from 1949 to 1950, CSKA from 1950 to 1967 (304 matches, 90 goals in A PFG) and Sliven in 1967/68 season. He was the first Bulgarian nominated for the Ballon d'Or. He holds the record for the most league appearances in The Eternal Derby of Bulgaria – 27.
