= Krum Yanev =

Bulgarian footballer

Personal information
- Full name: Krum Ivanov Yanev
- Date of birth: 9 January 1929
- Place of birth: Plovdiv, Kingdom of Bulgaria
- Date of death: 24 August 2012 (aged 83)
- Position: Forward

Senior career*
Years	Team	Apps	(Gls)
1945–1948	Spartak Plovdiv		
1948–1949	Lokomotiv Plovdiv	4	(4)
1949–1950	Botev Plovdiv		
1950–1960	CDNA Sofia	157	(50)
1960–1961	Spartak Sofia		

International career
1952–1959	Bulgaria	31	(4)
- * Club domestic league appearances and goals

Krum Ivanov Yanev (Bulgarian: Крум Иванов Янев) (9 January 1929 – 24 August 2012) was a Bulgarian footballer who played at both professional and international levels, as a forward.

== Career ==
Yanev started his career with Spartak Plovdiv. In 1948–49 season he scored four goals in four matches for Lokomotiv Plovdiv and then joined Botev Plovdiv.

In 1950 Yanev joined CDNA Sofia. For the club he played 157 matches, scoring 50 goals. With CSKA Sofia, he won eight A Group titles and two Bulgarian Cups.

He earned 31 caps for Bulgaria, earning a bronze medal at the 1956 Summer Olympics; he also competed at the 1952 Summer Olympics.
