= Gavril Stoyanov =

Bulgarian footballer and coach

Personal information
- Date of birth: 9 July 1929
- Place of birth: Sofia, Bulgaria
- Date of death: 6 November 2005 (aged 76)
- Place of death: Sofia, Bulgaria
- Position: Midfielder

Senior career*
Years	Team	Apps	(Gls)
1945–1948	Septemvri Sofia		
1948–1949	Bdin Vidin		
1949–1962	CDNA Sofia	168	(7)
1962–1963	Septemvri Sofia		
1963–1964	Spartak Sofia		

International career
1953–1958	Bulgaria	17	(0)

Managerial career
- 1971–1972: Svetkavitsa
- 1972–1973: Bdin Vidin
- 1973: Botev Plovdiv
- 1975: Minyor Pernik
- 1976: Belasitsa Petrich
- 1976–1977: AC Omonia
- 1977–1978: Benkovski Pazardzhik
- FC Linz
Medal record
Representing Bulgaria
Olympic Games
Bronze medal – third place	1956 Melbourne	Team competition
- * Club domestic league appearances and goals

Gavril Stoyanov (Bulgarian: Гаврил Стоянов; 9 July 1929 – 6 November 2005) was a Bulgarian football player and coach. He usually played in the position of midfielder.

== Honours ==
=== International ===
Bulgaria

- Olympic Bronze Medal: 1956
