= Dobromir Tashkov =

Bulgarian footballer and manager

Personal information
- Date of birth: 10 April 1925
- Place of birth: Varna, Bulgaria
- Date of death: 26 May 2017 (aged 92)
- Position: Forward

Senior career*
Years	Team	Apps	(Gls)
1942–1950	Spartak Varna	238	(157)
1951–1953	Spartak Sofia	70	(21)
1953–1961	Slavia Sofia	185	(97)

International career
1952–1954	Bulgaria	7	(2)

Managerial career
- 1963–1969: Slavia Sofia
- 1966: Bulgaria
- 1971–1972: Omonia
- 1973–1974: Slavia Sofia
- 1974–1975: Spartak Varna
- 1982–1983: Omonia
- * Club domestic league appearances and goals

Dobromir Tashkov (Bulgarian: Добромир Ташков; 10 April 1925 – 26 May 2017) was a Bulgarian football player and manager who played as a forward.

Tashkov was born in Varna. He spent his whole career at Spartak Varna and Slavia Sofia. For the Bulgaria national football team Tashkov featured in 7 games and scored 2 goals. He is the number one shooter in Spartak Varna's history with 157 goals.

== Honours ==
=== Individual ===
- Bulgarian League Top Scorer: 3 times
  - 1951/52 (with 10 goals for Spartak Sofia)
  - 1953/54 (with 25 goals for Slavia Sofia)
  - 1957/58 (with 9 goals for Slavia Sofia)
