= Albanian football clubs in European competitions =

Albanian football clubs have competed in European football tournaments since the 1962-63 season when Partizani Tirana played in the European Cup. Clubs took part in the UEFA Champions League (formerly the European Cup), UEFA Cup, UEFA Cup Winners' Cup, UEFA Europa League, UEFA Europa Conference League and UEFA Intertoto Cup.

Beside the 1968 withdrawal due to the Czechoslovak crisis, the Albanian clubs did not participate or partially participated in European football tournaments for six seasons between 1973 and 1979.

== General stats ==
- KF Tirana are the most successful Albanian club, they have won more ties in all competitions (14 times). (Note: Once directly by draw, without playing)
- KF Tirana have gone farthest in all competitions, reaching the Round of Sixteen 4 times.
- KF Tirana have participated the most times and played the most games (32 participations & 84 matches).
- Partizani Tirana are the first Albanian club to participate and also won a tie in a European competition UEFA Cup Winners' Cup 1970-71.
- KF Tirana have the most wins for an Albanian team (18).
- Biggest home win: KF Tirana 5-0 (Malta) Sliema Wanderers
- Biggest away win: (Andorra) Sant Julià 0-5 KF Skënderbeu Korçë
- Biggest home loss: KS Besa 0-5 (Greece) Olympiacos F.C.
- Biggest away loss: (Scotland) Motherwell F.C. 8-1 KS Flamurtari

== Achievements ==
- UEFA Champions League:
  - Round of 16 (3): KF Tirana in 1982, 1988, 1989 European Cup
- UEFA Europa League:
  - Round of 16 (1): Flamutari Vlora in 1987
  - Groupstage (2): KF Skënderbeu Korçë in 2015–16 and 2017–18
- UEFA Cup Winners' Cup:
  - Round of 16 (3): KF Besa Kavajë in 1972, KF Tirana in 1986 and KF Vllaznia Shkodër in the 1987 European Cup Winners' Cup
- Balkans Cup:
  - Winners (1): Partizani Tirana, 1970 Balkans Cup
  - Runners-up (1): KF Tirana, 1981–83 Balkans Cup
  - Runners-up (1): Besa Kavajë, 1971 Balkans Cup
  - Runners-up (1): Dinamo Tirana, 1969 Balkans Cup

== Country coefficient ==
As of 21 June 2022

Ranking			Member association (L: League, C: Cup)	Coefficient						Teams (Note: Number of teams still active from association in UEFA Champions League, UEFA Europa League or UEFA Europa Conference League.)	Places in 2024–25 season			
2023	2022	Mvmt	Member association (L: League, C: Cup)	2018–19	2019–20	2020–21	2021–22	2022–23	Total	Teams	UCL	UEL	UECL	Total
47	45	-2	Estonia (L, C)	0.500	0.875	1.375	3.666	1.166	7.582	4/4	To be announced			
48	52	+4	Iceland (L, C)	1.500	0.625	0.625	1.500	3.000	7.250	4/4	To be announced			
49	43	-6	Albania (L, C)	1.000	0.750	2.000	1.625	0.875	6.250	4/4	To be announced			
50	50	-	Wales (L, C)	1.000	1.000	1.500	1.500	1.165	6.166	4/4	To be announced			
51	51	-	Gibraltar (L, C)	1.000	1.000	1.666	1.250	0.875	5.791	4/4	To be announced			

== Competitions ==
=== Active ===
==== UEFA Champions League ====
Performances by clubs
Club	Pld	W	D	L	Win %
Tirana	40	8	4	28	20.00
Skënderbeu	16	6	3	7	37.50
Vllaznia	8	3	0	5	37.50
Partizani Tirana	23	2	8	13	8.70
Dinamo City	13	2	3	8	15.38
Egnatia	8	3	3	2	37.50
Kukësi	6	1	3	2	16.67
Elbasani	4	1	0	3	25.00
Flamurtari	2	0	2	0	0.00
Teuta	2	0	0	2	0.00
Total	122	26	26	70	

Below are summary tables of Albanian clubs results in all competitions.

=== European Cup / UEFA Champions League ===
Season	Club	Round	Opposition	Home	Away
1962–63	Partizani Tirana	1R	(Sweden) Norrköping	1–1	0–2
1963–64	Partizani Tirana	1R	(Bulgaria) Spartak Plovdiv	1–0	1–3
1964–65	Partizani Tirana	1R	(West Germany) Köln	0–0	0–2
1965–66	Tirana	1R	(Scotland) Kilmarnock	0–0	0–1
1966–67	Tirana	1R	(Norway) Vålerenga	n.d.	n.d.
1967–68	Dinamo Tirana	1R	(Germany) Eintracht Braunschweig	n.d.	n.d.
1969–70	Tirana	1R	(Belgium) Standard Liège	1–1	0–3
1970–71	Tirana	1R	(Netherlands) Ajax	2–2	0–2
1971–72	Partizani Tirana	1R	(Bulgaria) CSKA Sofia	0–1	0–3
1978–79	Vllaznia	1R	Austria Wien	2–0	1–4
1979–80	Partizani Tirana	1R	(Scotland) Celtic	1–0	1–4
1980–81	Dinamo Tirana	1R	(Netherlands) Ajax	0–2	0–1
1981–82	Partizani Tirana	1R	Austria Wien	1–0	1–3
1982–83	Tirana	1R	(Northern Ireland) Linfield	1–0	1–2
1982–83	Tirana	2R	(Soviet Union) Dynamo Kiev	n.d.	n.d.
1983–84	Vllaznia	1R	(West Germany) Hamburg	n.d.	n.d.
1984–85	Elbasani	1R	(Denmark) Lyngby	0–3	0–3
1986–87	Dinamo Tirana	1R	(Turkey) Beşiktaş	0–1	0–2
1987–88	Partizani Tirana	1R	(Portugal) Benfica	0–3(a)	0–4
1988–89	Tirana	1R	(Malta) Ħamrun Spartans	2–0	1–2
1988–89	Tirana	2R	(Sweden) IFK Göteborg	0–3	0–1
1989–90	Tirana	1R	(Malta) Sliema Wanderers	5–0	0–1
1989–90	Tirana	2R	(West Germany) Bayern Munich	0–3	1–3
1990–91	Dinamo Tirana	1R	(France) Marseille	0–0	1–5
1991–92	Flamurtari	1R	(Sweden) IFK Göteborg	1–1	0–0
1993–94	Partizani Tirana	1QR	(Iceland) ÍA	0–0	0–3
1998–99	Vllaznia	1QR	(Georgia (country)) Dinamo Tbilisi	3–1	0–3
1999–00	Tirana	1QR	(Iceland) ÍBV	1–2	0–1
2000–01	Tirana	1QR	(Moldova) Zimbru Chișinău	2–3	2–3
2001–02	Vllaznia	1QR	(Iceland) KR	1–0	1–2
2001–02	Vllaznia	2QR	(Turkey) Galatasaray	1–4	0–2
2002–03	Dinamo Tirana	1QR	(Lithuania) FBK Kaunas	0–0	3–2
2002–03	Dinamo Tirana	2QR	(Denmark) Brøndby	0–4	0–1
2003–04	Tirana	1QR	(Georgia (country)) Dinamo Tbilisi	3–0(p. 4–2)	0–3
2003–04	Tirana	2QR	(Austria) GAK	1–5	1–2
2004–05	Tirana	1QR	(Belarus) Gomel	0–1	2–0
2004–05	Tirana	2QR	(Hungary) Ferencváros	2–3	1–0
2005–06	Tirana	1QR	(Slovenia) ND Gorica	3–0	0–2
2005–06	Tirana	2QR	(Bulgaria) CSKA Sofia	0–2	0–2
2006–07	Elbasani	1QR	(Lithuania) Ekranas	1–0	0–3
2007–08	Tirana	1QR	(Slovenia) Domžale	1–2	0–1
2008–09	Dinamo Tirana	1QR	(Bosnia and Herzegovina) Modriča	0–2	1–2
2009–10	Tirana	2QR	(Norway) Stabæk	1–1	0–4
2010–11	Dinamo Tirana	2QR	(Moldova) Sheriff Tiraspol	1–0	1–3
2011–12	Skënderbeu	2QR	(Cyprus) APOEL	0–2	0–4
2012–13	Skënderbeu	2QR	(Hungary) Debrecen	1–0	0–3
2013–14	Skënderbeu	2QR	(Azerbaijan) Neftchi Baku	1–0 (aet)	0–0
2013–14	Skënderbeu	3QR	(Kazakhstan) Shakhter Karagandy	3–2	0–3
2014–15	Skënderbeu	2QR	(Belarus) BATE Borisov	1–1	0–0
2015–16	Skënderbeu	2QR	(Northern Ireland) Crusaders	4–1	2–3
2015–16	Skënderbeu	3QR	(Moldova) Milsami Orhei	2–0	2–0
2015–16	Skënderbeu	PO	(Croatia) Dinamo Zagreb	1–2	1–4
2016–17	Partizani Tirana	2QR	(Hungary) Ferencváros	1–1	1–1(p. 3–1)
2016–17	Partizani Tirana	3QR	(Austria) Red Bull Salzburg	0–1	0–2
2017–18	Kukësi	2QR	(Moldova) Sheriff Tiraspol	2–1	0–1
2018–19	Kukësi	1QR	(Malta) Valletta	0–0	1–1
2018–19	Kukësi	2QR	(Azerbaijan) Qarabağ	0–0	0–3
2019–20	Partizani Tirana	1QR	(Azerbaijan) Qarabağ	0–0	0–2
2020–21	Tirana	1QR	(Georgia (country)) Dinamo Tbilisi	n.d.	2–0
2020–21	Tirana	2QR	(Serbia) Red Star Belgrade	0–1	n.d.
2021–22	Teuta	1QR	(Moldova) Sheriff Tiraspol	0–4	0–1
2022–23	Tirana	1QR	(Luxembourg) F91 Dudelange	1–2	0–1
2023–24	Partizani Tirana	1QR	(Belarus) BATE Borisov	1–1	0–2
2024–25	Egnatia	1QR	(Bosnia and Herzegovina) Borac Banja Luka	2–1(p. 1–4)	0–1
2025–26	Egnatia	1QR	(Iceland) Breiðablik	1–0	0–5
2026–27	Egnatia	1QR	(Moldova) Petrocub Hîncești	6–1	1–1
2026–27	Egnatia	2QR	(Slovenia) Celje	3–3	2–2(p. 1–4)

- PR = Preliminary Round
- QR = Qualifying Round
- 1R = First Round
- 2R = Second Round
- 3R = Third Round
- PO = Play-off Round
- n.d. = Did not play
- w/o = Did not appear

=== UEFA Cup / UEFA Europa League ===
Performances by clubs
Club	Pld	W	D	L	Win %
Skenderbeu Korca	22	7	5	10	31.82
KF Kukesi	26	7	7	12	26.92
Flamutari Vlora	20	6	4	10	30.00
KF Tirana	28	5	7	16	17.86
KF Teuta Durresi	18	4	1	13	22.22
Vllaznia Shkoder	18	3	5	10	16.67
Dinamo Tirana	16	3	2	11	18.75
KF Laci	18	1	7	10	5.56
Partizani Tirana	23	1	4	18	4.35
KF Elbasani	2	0	2	0	0.00
KF Besa Kavaja	6	0	2	4	0.00
FK Apolonia Fier	2	0	0	2	0.00
KF Bylis	2	0	0	2	0.00
KF Egnatia	1	0	0	1	0.00
Total	202	37	46	119	

Season	Club	Round	Opposition	Home	Away
1971–72	Vllaznia	1R	(Austria) Rapid Wien	n.d.	n.d.
1981–82	Dinamo Tirana	1R	(East Germany) Carl Zeiss Jena	1–0	0–4
1985–86	Dinamo Tirana	1R	(Malta) Ħamrun Spartans	1–0	0–0
1985–86	Dinamo Tirana	2R	(Portugal) Sporting CP	0–0	0–1
1986–87	Flamurtari	1R	(Spain) Barcelona	1–1	0–0
1987–88	Flamurtari	1R	(Socialist Federal Republic of Yugoslavia) Partizan	2–0	1–2
1987–88	Flamurtari	2R	(East Germany) Wismut Aue	2–0	0–1
1987–88	Flamurtari	3R	(Spain) Barcelona	1–0	1–4
1989–90	Apolonia	1R	(France) Auxerre	0–3	0–5
1990–91	Partizani	1R	(Romania) Universitatea Craiova	0–1	0–1
1991–92	Vllaznia	1R	(Greece) AEK Athens	0–1	0–2
1994–95	Teuta	PR	(Cyprus) Apollon Limassol	1–4	2–4
1995–96	Partizani	PR	(Turkey) Fenerbahçe	0–4	0–2
1996–97	Tirana	PR	Croatia Zagreb	2–6	0–4
1998–99	Tirana	1QR	(Slovakia) Inter Bratislava	0–2	0–2
1999–00	Vllaznia	QR	(Slovakia) Spartak Trnava	1–1	0–2
1999–00	Bylis	1QR	(Slovakia) Inter Bratislava	1–3	0–2
2000–01	Teuta	QR	(Austria) Rapid Wien	0–4	0–2
2000–01	Tomori	QR	(Cyprus) APOEL	2–3	0–2
2001–02	Dinamo Tirana	QR	(Romania) Dinamo București	1–3	0–1
2001–02	Tirana	QR	(Cyprus) Apollon Limassol	3–2	1–3
2002–03	Partizani	QR	(Israel) Hapoel Tel Aviv	1–4	0–1
2002–03	Tirana	QR	(Romania) National București	0–1	2–2
2003–04	Vllaznia	QR	(Scotland) Dundee	0–3	0–4
2003–04	Dinamo Tirana	QR	(Belgium) Lokeren	0–4	1–3
2004–05	Partizani	1QR	(Malta) Birkirkara	4–2	1–2
2004–05	Partizani	2QR	(Israel) Bnei Sakhnin	1–3	0–3
2004–05	Dinamo Tirana	1QR	(Romania) Oţelul Galaţi	0–4	1–4
2005–06	Teuta	1QR	(Bosnia and Herzegovina) Široki Brijeg	3–1	0–3
2005–06	KF Elbasani	1QR	(North Macedonia) Vardar	1–1	0–0
2006–07	Tirana	1QR	(Croatia) Varteks	2–0	1–1
2006–07	Tirana	2QR	(Turkey) Kayserispor	0–2	1–3
2006–07	Dinamo Tirana	1QR	(Bulgaria) CSKA Sofia	0–1	1–4
2007–08	Teuta	1QR	(Croatia) Slaven Belupo	2–2	2–6
2007–08	Besa	1QR	(Serbia) Bežanija	0–0	2–2
2007–08	Besa	2QR	(Bulgaria) Litex Lovech	0–3	0–3
2008–09	Partizani	1QR	(Bosnia and Herzegovina) Široki Brijeg	1–3	0–0
2008–09	Vllaznia	1QR	(Slovenia) Koper	0–0	2–1
2008–09	Vllaznia	2QR	(Italy) Napoli	0–3	0–5
2009–10	Dinamo Tirana	1QR	(Finland) Lahti	2–0	1–4
2009–10	Vllaznia	1QR	(Republic of Ireland) Sligo Rovers	1–1	2–1
2009–10	Vllaznia	2QR	(Austria) Rapid Wien	0–3	0–5
2009–10	Flamurtari	2QR	(Scotland) Motherwell	1–0	1–8
2010–11	Tirana	1QR	(Hungary) Zalaegerszeg	0–0	1–0(aet)
2010–11	Tirana	2QR	(Netherlands) Utrecht	1–1	0–4
2010–11	Laçi	1QR	(Belarus) Dnepr Mogilev	1–1	1–7
2010–11	Besa	2QR	(Greece) Olympiacos	0–5	1–6
2011–12	Flamurtari	1QR	(Montenegro) Budućnost Podgorica	1–2	3–1
2011–12	Flamurtari	2QR	(Czech Republic) Jablonec	0–2	1–5
2011–12	Vllaznia	1QR	(Malta) Birkirkara	1–1	1–0
2011–12	Vllaznia	2QR	(Switzerland) Thun	0–0	1–2
2011–12	Tirana	2QR	(Slovakia) Spartak Trnava	0–0	1–3
2012–13	Flamurtari	1QR	(Hungary) Honved	0–1	0–2
2012–13	Teuta	1QR	(Georgia (country)) Metalurgi Rustavi	0–3	1–6
2012–13	Tirana	1QR	(Luxembourg) Grevenmacher	2–0	0–0
2012–13	Tirana	2QR	(Norway) Aalesund	1–1	0–5
2013–14	Teuta	1QR	(Moldova) Dacia Chișinău	3–1	0–2
2013–14	Laçi	1QR	(Luxembourg) Differdange 03	0–1	1–2
2013–14	Kukësi	1QR	(Estonia) Flora Tallinn	0–0	1–1
2013–14	Kukësi	2QR	(Bosnia and Herzegovina) Sarajevo	3–2	0–0
2013–14	Kukësi	3QR	(Ukraine) Metalurh Donetsk	2–0	0–1
2013–14	Kukësi	PO	(Turkey) Trabzonspor	0–2	1–3
2013–14	Skënderbeu	PO	(Ukraine) Chornomorets Odesa	1–0(p. 6–7)	0–1
2014–15	Kukësi	1QR	(Kazakhstan) Kairat	0–0	0–1
2014–15	Laçi	1QR	(Slovenia) Rudar Velenje	1–1(p. 3–2)	1–1
2014–15	Laçi	2QR	(Ukraine) Zorya Luhansk	0–3	1–2
2014–15	Flamurtari	1QR	(Georgia (country)) Sioni Bolnisi	1–2	3–2
2014–15	Flamurtari	2QR	(Romania) Petrolul Ploiești	1–3	0–2
2015–16	Kukësi	1QR	(Belarus) Torpedo-BelAZ Zhodino	2–0	0–0
2015–16	Kukësi	2QR	(Montenegro) Mladost Podgorica	0–1	4–2
2015–16	Kukësi	3QR	(Poland) Legia Warsaw	0–3(a)	0–1
2015–16	Laçi	1QR	(Azerbaijan) Inter Baku	1–1	0–0
2015–16	Partizani	1QR	(Norway) Strømsgodset	0–1	1–3
2015–16	Skënderbeu	GS	(Turkey) Beşiktaş	0–1	0–2
2015–16	Skënderbeu	GS	(Russia) Lokomotiv Moscow	0–3	0–2
2015–16	Skënderbeu	GS	(Portugal) Sporting CP	3–0	1–5
2016–17	Kukësi	1QR	(Montenegro) Rudar Pljevlja	1–1	1–0
2016–17	Kukësi	2QR	Austria Wien	1–4	0–1
2016–17	Partizani	1QR	(Slovakia) Slovan Bratislava	0–0	n.d.
2016–17	Partizani	PO	(Russia) Krasnodar	0–0	0–4
2016–17	Teuta	1QR	(Kazakhstan) Kairat	0–1	0–5
2017–18	Skënderbeu	1QR	(Andorra) Sant Julià	1–0	5–0
2017–18	Skënderbeu	2QR	(Kazakhstan) Kairat	2–0	1–1
2017–18	Skënderbeu	3QR	(Czech Republic) Mladá Boleslav	2–1(p. 4–2)	1–2
2017–18	Skënderbeu	PO	(Croatia) Dinamo Zagreb	0–0	1–1
2017–18	Skënderbeu	GS	(Ukraine) Dynamo Kyiv	3–2	1–3
2017–18	Skënderbeu	GS	(Serbia) Partizan	0–0	0–2
2017–18	Skënderbeu	GS	(Switzerland) Young Boys	1–1	1–2
2017–18	Partizani	1QR	(Bulgaria) Botev Plovdiv	1–3	0–1
2017–18	Tirana	1QR	(Israel) Maccabi Tel Aviv	0–3	0–2
2018–19	Kukësi	3QR	(Georgia (country)) Torpedo Kutaisi	2–0	2–5
2018–19	Laçi	1QR	(Cyprus) Anorthosis Famagusta	1–0	1–2
2018–19	Laçi	2QR	(Norway) Molde	0–2	0–3
2018–19	KF Luftëtari	1QR	(Latvia) Ventspils	3–3	0–5
2018–19	Partizani	1QR	(Slovenia) Maribor	0–1	0–2
2019–20	Kukësi	1QR	(Hungary) Debrecen	1–1	0–3
2019–20	Laçi	1QR	(Israel) Hapoel Be'er Sheva	1–1	0–1
2019–20	Partizani	2QR	(Moldova) Sheriff Tiraspol	0–1	1–1
2019–20	Teuta	1QR	(Latvia) Ventspils	1–0	0–3
2020–21	Kukësi	1QR	(Bulgaria) Slavia Sofia	2–1	—N/a
2020–21	Kukësi	2QR	(Germany) Wolfsburg	0–4	—N/a
2020–21	Laçi	1QR	(Azerbaijan) Keşla	—N/a	0–0(p. 5–4)
2020–21	Laçi	2QR	(Israel) Hapoel Be'er Sheva	1–2	—N/a
2020–21	Teuta	1QR	(Israel) Beitar Jerusalem	2–0	—N/a
2020–21	Teuta	2QR	(Spain) Granada	0–4	—N/a
2020–21	Tirana	PO	(Switzerland) Young Boys	—N/a	0–3
2026–27	Egnatia	3QR	(Republic of Ireland) Shamrock Rovers	5–1	1–3

- PR = Preliminary Round
- QR = Qualifying Round
- 1R = First Round
- 2R = Second Round
- PO = Play-off Round
- GS = Group Stage
- n.d. = Did not play
- w/o = Did not appear

=== UEFA Conference League ===
Performances by clubs
Club	Pld	W	D	L	Win %
Partizani Tirana	18	8	6	4	44.44
Vllaznia Shkoder	16	5	2	9	31.25
KF Laci	10	3	3	4	30.00
KF Egnatia	8	3	3	2	37.50
Dinamo Tirana	11	4	3	4	36.36
KF Tirana	8	1	2	5	12.50
KF Teuta Durresi	4	1	0	3	25.00
AF Elbasani	2	0	2	0	0.00
Total	77	25	21	31	

Season	Club	Round	Opposition	Home	Away
2021–22	Laçi	1QR	(Montenegro) Podgorica	3–0 (aet)	0–1
2021–22	Laçi	2QR	(Romania) Universitatea Craiova	1–0	0–0
2021–22	Laçi	3QR	(Belgium) Anderlecht	0–3	1–2
2021–22	Partizani	1QR	(Moldova) Sfântul Gheorghe	5–2	3–2
2021–22	Partizani	2QR	(Switzerland) Basel	0–2	0–3
2021–22	Teuta	2QR	(Andorra) Inter Club d'Escaldes	0–2	3–0 (aet)
2021–22	Teuta	3QR	(Republic of Ireland) Shamrock Rovers	0–2	0–1
2021–22	Vllaznia	1QR	(Bosnia and Herzegovina) Široki Brijeg	3–0	1–3
2021–22	Vllaznia	2QR	(Cyprus) AEL Limassol	0–1	0–1
2022–23	Laçi	1QR	(Montenegro) Iskra Danilovgrad	0–0	1–0
2022–23	Laçi	2QR	(Moldova) Petrocub Hîncești	1–4	0–0
2022–23	Partizani	1QR	(Georgia (country)) Saburtalo Tbilisi	0–1(p. 4–5)	1–0
2022–23	Tirana	2QR	(Bosnia and Herzegovina) Zrinjski Mostar	0–1	2–3
2022–23	Vllaznia	2QR	(Romania) Universitatea Craiova	0–3	1–1
2023–24	Egnatia	1QR	Ararat-Armenia	4–4(p. 2–4)	1–1
2023–24	Partizani	2QR	(Andorra) Atlètic Club d'Escaldes	4–1	1–0
2023–24	Partizani	3QR	(Latvia) Valmiera	1–0	2–1
2023–24	Partizani	PO	(Kazakhstan) Astana	1–1	0–1
2023–24	Tirana	1QR	(Georgia (country)) Dinamo Batumi	1–1	2–1
2023–24	Tirana	2QR	(Turkey) Beşiktaş	0–2	1–3
2023–24	Vllaznia	2QR	(Northern Ireland) Linfield	1–0	1–3
2024–25	Egnatia	2QR	(Iceland) Víkingur Reykjavík	0–2	1–0
2024–25	Partizani	1QR	(Malta) Marsaxlokk	1–1	2–1
2024–25	Partizani	2QR	(Georgia (country)) Iberia 1999	0–0	0–2
2024–25	Tirana	1QR	(Georgia (country)) Torpedo Kutaisi	0–1	1–1
2024–25	Vllaznia	1QR	(Iceland) Valur	0–4	2–2
2025–26	Dinamo City	2QR	(Moldova) Atlètic Club d'Escaldes	1–1	2–1
2025–26	Dinamo City	3QR	(Croatia) Hajduk Split	3–1 (a.e.t)	1–2
2025–26	Dinamo City	PO	(Poland) Jagiellonia Białystok	0–3	1–1
2025–26	Egnatia	2QR	(Belarus) Dinamo Minsk	1–0	2–0
2025–26	Egnatia	3QR	(Slovenia) Olimpija Ljubljana	2–4 (a.e.t)	0–0
2025–26	Partizani	1QR	(Estonia) Nõmme Kalju	0–1 (a.e.t)	1–1
2025–26	Vllaznia	1QR	(Latvia) Daugavpils	0–1	4–2
2025–26	Vllaznia	2QR	(Iceland) Víkingur Reykjavík	2–1	2–4 (a.e.t)
2026–27	Dinamo City	1QR	(Kazakhstan) Astana	0–1	4–1 (a.e.t)
2026–27	Dinamo City	2QR	(Slovenia) Aluminij	3–0	1–1
2026–27	Dinamo City	3QR	(Latvia) Auda	4–0	0–1
2026–27	Elbasani	1QR	(Belarus) BATE Borisov	1–1	0–0(p. 4–5)
2026–27	Vllaznia	1QR	(Kosovo) Malisheva	2–1	0–5

- PR = Preliminary Round
- QR = Qualifying Round
- 1R = First Round
- 2R = Second Round
- PO = Play-off Round
- GS = Group Stage
- n.d. = Did not play
- w/o = Did not appear

Last update 04.08.2026

=== UEFA Cup Winners' Cup ===
Performances by clubs
Club	Pld	W	D	L	Win %
KF Tirana	10	4	1	5	40.00
Partizani Tirana	10	2	3	5	20.00
Dinamo Tirana	8	2	2	4	25.00
Vllaznia Shkoder	8	2	0	6	25.00
KF Teuta Durresi	4	1	0	3	25.00
KS Besa Kavaja	4	0	3	1	0.00
KF Albpetrol Patos	2	0	1	1	0.00
FK Apolonia Fier	2	0	0	2	0.00
Flamutari Vlora	8	0	0	8	0.00
Total	56	11	10	35	

Season	Club	Round	Opposition	Home	Away
1968–69	Partizani	1R	(Italy) Torino	1–0	1–3
1970–71	Partizani	PR	(Sweden) Åtvidaberg	2–0	1–1
1970–71	Partizani	1R	(Austria) Wacker Innsbruck	1–2	2–3
1971–72	Dinamo Tirana	1R	Austria Wien	1–1	0–1
1972–73	Besa	1R	(Denmark) Fremad Amager	0–0	1–1
1972–73	Besa	2R	(Scotland) Hibernian	1–1	1–7
1979–80	Vllaznia	1R	(Soviet Union) Dynamo Moscow	n.d.	n.d.
1980–81	Partizani	1R	(Sweden) Malmö	0–0	0–1
1982–83	Dinamo Tirana	1R	(Scotland) Aberdeen	0–0	0–1
1983–84	Tirana	1R	(Sweden) Hammarby	2–1	0–4
1985–86	Flamurtari	1R	(Finland) HJK Helsinki	1–2	2–3
1986–87	Tirana	1R	(Romania) Dinamo București	1–0	2–1
1986–87	Tirana	2R	(Sweden) Malmö	0–3	0–0
1987–88	Vllaznia	1R	(Malta) Sliema Wanderers	2–0	4–0
1987–88	Vllaznia	2R	(Finland) RoPS	0–1	0–1
1988–89	Flamurtari	1R	(Poland) Lech Poznań	2–3	0–1
1989–90	Dinamo Tirana	PR	(Bulgaria) FC Chernomorets	4–0	1–3
1989–90	Dinamo Tirana	1R	(Romania) Dinamo București	1–0	0–2
1990–91	Flamurtari	1R	(Greece) Olympiacos	0–2	1–3
1991–92	Partizani	1R	(Netherlands) Feyenoord	0–0	0–1
1993–94	Albpetrol	QR	(Liechtenstein) Balzers	0–0	1–3
1994–95	Tirana	QR	(Belarus) FC Bobruisk	3–0	1–4
1994–95	Tirana	1R	(Denmark) Brøndby	0–1	0–3
1995–96	Teuta	QR	(Finland) TPS	3–0	0–1
1995–96	Teuta	1R	(Italy) Parma	0–2	0–2
1996–97	Flamurtari	QR	(Slovakia) Humenné	0–2	0–1
1998–99	Apolonia	QR	(Belgium) Genk	1–5	0–4

- PR = Preliminary Round
- QR = Qualifying Round
- 1R = First Round
- 2R = Second Round
- n.d. = Did not play
- w/o = Did not appear

=== Balkan Cup ===
==== KF Tirana ====
Season	Round	Country	Country	Home	Away	Qual/Elim
Balkans Cup 1964–66	1R	(Bulgaria)	PFC Cherno More Varna	0–0	0–1	
Balkans Cup 1964–66	1R	(Turkey)	Beşiktaş J.K.	2–0	1–1	
Balkans Cup 1964–66	1R	(Romania)	FC Rapid București	1–2	1–3	
Balkans Cup 1975	1R	(Greece)	Panionios	6–0	1–2	
Balkans Cup 1975	1R	(Serbia)	FK Radnički Niš	0–0	0–3	
Balkans Cup 1981	1R	(Greece)	AEL	3–0	1–3	
Balkans Cup 1981	2R	(Bosnia and Herzegovina)	FK Sloboda Tuzla	3–0	3–0	
Balkans Cup 1981	Final	(Bulgaria)	PFC Beroe Stara Zagora	1–3	0–3	
Balkans Cup 1990	1R	(Montenegro)	FK Budućnost Podgorica	0–0	0–1	

==== Partizani Tirana ====
Season	Competition	Round	Club	Home	Away	Aggregate
1960–61	Balkans Cup	1/5	(Romania) Steagul Roșu Brașov	0–0	0–1	3rd
1960–61	Balkans Cup	1/5	(Bulgaria) Levski Sofia	2–0	0–4	3rd
1960–61	Balkans Cup	1/5	(Turkey) Fenerbahçe	0–0	0–1	3rd
1960–61	Balkans Cup	1/5	(Greece) AEK Athens	3–0	3–0	3rd
1966–67	Balkans Cup	Group A	(Bulgaria) Cherno More Varna	2–0	1–3	2nd
1966–67	Balkans Cup	Group A	(Romania) UTA Arad	2–0	2–1	2nd
1966–67	Balkans Cup	Group A	(Turkey) Fenerbahçe	2–0	2–3	2nd
1970	Balkans Cup	Group B	(Socialist Federal Republic of Yugoslavia) Sloboda Tuzla	1–2	1–1	1st
1970	Balkans Cup	Group B	(Romania) Universitatea Craiova	1–0	0–1	1st
1970	Balkans Cup	Final	(Bulgaria) Beroe Stara Zagora	3–0	1–1	4–1
1974	Balkans Cup	Group B	(Socialist Federal Republic of Yugoslavia) FK Vardar	2–1	0–2	3rd
1974	Balkans Cup	Group B	(Greece) AEL	2–2	1–3	3rd
1979–80	Balkans Cup	Group A	(Socialist Federal Republic of Yugoslavia) Rijeka	4–1	0–3	2nd
1979–80	Balkans Cup	Group A	(Greece) PAS Giannina	2–0	0–3	2nd

==== Dinamo Tirana ====
Season	Competition	Round	Club	Home	Away	Aggregate	
1961–63	Balkans Cup	Group B	(Romania)	FC Dinamo București	1–1	3–2	2nd
1961–63	Balkans Cup	Group B	(Bulgaria)	Levski Sofia	0–0	2–2	2nd
1961–63	Balkans Cup	Group B	(Turkey)	Fenerbahçe	3–2	0–1	2nd
1963–64	Balkans Cup	Group A	(Turkey)	Beşiktaş	2–0	0–1	3rd
1963–64	Balkans Cup	Group A	(Romania)	Rapid București	1–1	1–2	3rd
1963–64	Balkans Cup	Group A	(Bulgaria)	Levski Sofia	1–1	1–1	3rd
1969	Balkans Cup	Group A	(Romania)	Universitatea Craiova	2–0	1–3	1st
1969	Balkans Cup	Group A	(Socialist Federal Republic of Yugoslavia)	OFK Bor	4–1	2–2	1st
1969	Balkans Cup	Final	(Bulgaria)	Beroe Stara Zagora	1–0	0–3	1–3
1976	Balkans Cup	Group B	(Socialist Federal Republic of Yugoslavia)	Dinamo Zagreb	1–2	1–2	2nd
1976	Balkans Cup	Group B	(Greece)	Ethnikos Piraeus	2–0	3–4	2nd
1987–88	Balkans Cup	Group B	(Turkey)	Eskişehirspor	3–1	0–4	3rd
1987–88	Balkans Cup	Group B	(Romania)	Corvinul Hunedoara	1–1	0–2	3rd

==== KF Vllaznia Shkodër ====
Season	Competition	Round	Club	Home	Away	Aggregate	
1967–68	Balkans Cup	Group A	(Bulgaria)	Beroe Stara Zagora	4–0	0–2	2nd
1967–68	Balkans Cup	Group A	(Turkey)	Gençlerbirliği	1–0	1–1	2nd
1967–68	Balkans Cup	Group A	(Romania)	Farul Constanța	2–1	1–2	2nd
1977	Balkans Cup	Group B	(Greece)	Panathinaikos	1–1	0–3	3rd
1977	Balkans Cup	Group B	(Socialist Federal Republic of Yugoslavia)	Budućnost Titograd	1–1	0–2	3rd
1986	Balkans Cup	QF	(Romania)	Gloria Buzău	0–0	0–3	

==== KF Elbasani ====
Season	Competition	Group	Country	Club	Home	Away	Aggregate
1973	Balkans Cup	A	(Socialist Federal Republic of Yugoslavia)	Sutjeska Nikšić	1–0	0–1	1–1
1973	Balkans Cup	A	(Romania)	ASA Târgu Mureș	2–0	1–5	3–5
1988–89	Balkans Cup	A	(Turkey)	Malatyaspor	3–0	– (Note: Malatyaspor withdrew during the first leg which was awarded 3–0 to Elbasan)	3–0
1988–89	Balkans Cup	A	(Greece)	OFI	1–1	0–3	1–4

==== KF Besa Kavajë ====
Season	Competition	Round	Country	Club	Home	Away	Aggregate
1971	Balkans Cup	Group A	(Bulgaria)	Etar Veliko Tarnovo	2–1	0–2	1st
1971	Balkans Cup	Group A	(Socialist Federal Republic of Yugoslavia)	FK Crvenka	1–0	2–2	1st
1971	Balkans Cup	Final	(Greece)	Panionios	1–1	1–2	2–3

==== KF Skënderbeu Korçë ====
Season	Competition	Round	Club	Home	Away	Aggregate
1977–78	Balkans Cup	Group B	(Socialist Federal Republic of Yugoslavia) Rijeka	1–0	0–6	2nd
1977–78	Balkans Cup	Group B	(Greece) Aris	2–0	0–2	2nd

==== Flamutari Vlora ====
Season	Competition	Round	Club	Home	Away	Aggregate
1980–81	Balkans Cup	Group A	(Greece) AEK Athens	2–1	2–3	3rd
1980–81	Balkans Cup	Group A	(Socialist Federal Republic of Yugoslavia) Velež Mostar	2–1	1–4	3rd

==== FK Tomori Berat ====
Season	Competition	Round	Country	Club	Home	Away	Aggregate
1991–92	Balkans Cup	SF	(Romania)	Oțelul Galați	2–0	0–4	2–4

==== KF Teuta Durrës ====
Season	Competition	Round	Country	Club	Home	Away	Aggregate
1992–93	Balkans Cup	QF	(Bulgaria)	Beroe Stara Zagora	1–1	1–0	2–1 (a.e.t.)
1992–93	Balkans Cup	SF	(Greece)	Edessaikos	2–0	0–2	2–2 (3–5 pen)

==== Albania's record in the Balkan Cup ====
Overall	GP	W	D	L	GF	GA	GD
Home	48	28	15	5	82	27	+55
Away	48	5	8	35	36	101	−65
Total	96	33	23	40	118	128	-10

- QR = Qualifying Round
- 1R = 1st round
- 2R = 2nd round
- n.p = non participation

=== UEFA Intertoto Cup ===
Season	Club	Round	Opposition	Home	Away
1999	Teuta	1R	(Iceland) ÍA	2–1	1–5
2000	Vllaznia	1R	(Cyprus) Nea Salamis Famagusta	1–2	1–4
2001	Bylis	1R	(Romania) FC Universitatea Craiova	0–1	3–3
2002	Teuta	1R	(Malta) Valletta	0–0	2–1
2002	Teuta	2R	(Romania) Gloria Bistrița	1–0	0–3
2003	Partizani	1R	(Israel) Maccabi Netanya	2–0	1–3
2003	Partizani	2R	(Moldova) Dacia Chișinău	0–3	0–2
2004	Vllaznia	1R	(Israel) Hapoel Be'er Sheva	1–2	3–0
2004	Vllaznia	2R	(Croatia) Slaven Belupo	1–0	0–2
2005	Dinamo Tirana	1R	(Croatia) Varteks	2–1	1–4
2006	Partizani	1R	(Cyprus) Ethnikos Achna	2–1	2–4
2007	Vllaznia	1R	(Croatia) NK Zagreb	1–0	1–2
2007	Vllaznia	2R	(Turkey) Trabzonspor	0–4	0–6
2008	Besa	1R	(Cyprus) Ethnikos Achna	0–0	1–1
2008	Besa	2R	(Switzerland) Grasshopper	0–3	1–2

- PR = Preliminary Round
- QR = Qualifying Round
- 1R = First Round
- 2R = Second Round
- n.d. = Did not play
- w/o = Did not appear

== Overal Record ==
Competition	P	W	D	L	GF	GA	GD	Win %
UEFA Champions League	118	25	23	70	86	199	−113	21.19
UEFA Europa League / UEFA Cup	203	37	46	120	152	392	−240	18.23
UEFA Conference League	67	22	17	28	74	93	−19	32.84
UEFA Cup Winners' Cup	56	11	10	35	39	79	−40	19.64
Balkans Cup	96	33	23	40	118	128	−10	34.38
UEFA Intertoto Cup	32	9	4	19	30	59	−29	28.13
Total	572	137	123	312	499	950	−451	23.95

=== Albanian clubs against countries ===
Country	Pld	W	D	L	GF	GA	GD	TW	TL
Andorra	4	3	0	1	9	2	+7	2	0
Austria	22	2	1	19	13	54	-41	0	10
Azerbaijan	9	1	6	2	2	6	-4	2	3
Belarus	12	3	6	3	12	15	-3	3	3
Belgium	8	0	1	7	4	25	-19	0	4
Bosnia and Herzegovina	10	3	2	5	12	15	-3	2	3
Bulgaria	15	3	0	12	10	31	-21	2	6
Croatia	14	4	3	7	14	27	-13	3	4
Cyprus	16	3	2	13	18	40	-22	2	7
Czech Republic	4	1	0	3	4	10	-6	1	1
Denmark	8	0	2	6	1	16	-15	1	3
Estonia	2	0	2	0	1	1	-	1	0
Finland	8	2	0	6	9	12	-3	1	3
France	4	0	1	3	1	13	-12	0	2
Germany	9	2	1	6	3	17	-17	1	6
Georgia	13	6	0	7	21	29	-8	4	3
Greece	6	0	0	6	2	19	-17	0	3
Hungary	12	3	4	5	8	15	-7	2	4
Iceland	6	1	1	4	3	8	-5	1	2
Republic of Ireland	4	1	1	2	3	2	-2	1	1
Israel	14	3	1	10	13	25	-12	3	5
Italy	6	1	0	5	2	15	-13	0	3
Kazakhstan	10	3	3	4	9	14	-5	2	3
Latvia	4	1	1	2	4	11	-7	0	2
Liechtenstein	2	0	1	1	1	3	-	0	1
Lithuania	4	2	1	1	4	5	-1	1	1
Luxembourg	4	1	1	2	3	3	-	1	1
Malta	14	7	4	3	23	9	+14	7	0
Moldova	14	9	0	5	23	19	+4	3	4
Montenegro	12	6	2	4	19	11	+8	5	0
Netherlands	8	0	3	5	3	13	-10	0	4
North Macedonia	2	0	2	0	1	1	-	0	1
Northern Ireland	4	2	0	2	8	6	+2	2	0
Norway	8	0	2	6	3	20	-17	0	5
Poland	4	0	0	4	2	8	-6	0	2
Portugal	5	2	1	4	8	11	-3	0	3
Romania	20	5	3	12	14	29	-15	2	8
Russia	4	0	1	3	0	9	-9	0	2
Scotland	12	3	2	7	8	31	-23	0	6
Serbia	12	3	5	4	14	15	-1	4	2
Slovakia	11	0	3	8	3	18	-15	0	5
Slovenia	12	2	5	5	10	13	-3	4	2
Spain	5	1	2	2	3	9	-6	0	3
Sweden	14	2	6	6	6	17	-11	1	6
Switzerland	8	0	2	6	4	15	-11	0	4
Turkey	14	0	0	14	3	41	-38	0	7
Ukraine	10	3	0	7	9	17	-8	1	5

- TW = Ties won
- TL = Ties lost

Last update: 01.10.2020

== Other European competitions ==
=== UEFA Youth League ===
Season	Club	Round	Opponent	Home	Away	Agg.
2017–18	Vllaznia Shkodër	First round	(Moldova) Zimbru Chișinău	2-4	1-3	3-7
2018–19	Vllaznia Shkodër	First round	(Kazakhstan) Astana	0-4	1-3	1-7
2019–20	Shkëndija Tiranë	First round	(Moldova) Sheriff Tiraspo	1-2	0-1	1-3
2021–22	Akademia e Futbollit	First round	(Bulgaria) Septemvri Sofia	1-1	0-3	1-4
2022–23	Apolonia	First round	(Kazakhstan) Astana	3-1	1–1	4-2
2022–23	Apolonia	Second round	(Croatia) Hajduk Split	0-3	1-3	1-6
2024–25	Bylis	First round	(Kosovo) 2 Korriku	1-2	1-2	2-4
2025–26	KF Skënderbeu Korça	First round	(Andorra) Inter Club d'Escaldes	0-10	5-0	15-0

=== Overall record ===
As of 9 October 2025

=== By competition ===
Competition	P	W	D	L	GF	GA	GD	Win %
UEFA Youth League	18	3	3	12	29	40	−11	16.67

=== By country ===
Opponents	Pld	W	D	L	GF	GA	GD
Andorra	2	2	0	0	15	0	+15
Kazakhstan	4	1	1	2	5	9	-4
Moldova	4	0	0	4	4	10	−6
Bulgaria	2	0	1	1	1	4	−3
England	2	0	1	1	1	7	−6
Croatia	2	0	0	2	1	6	−5
Kosovo	2	0	0	2	2	4	−2
