= Myumyun Kashmer =

Bulgarian footballer (born 1962)

Myumyun Kashmer Milan Kashmerov
Personal information
- Date of birth: 20 January 1962 (age 64)
- Place of birth: Kardzhali, Bulgaria
- Position: Forward

Senior career*
Years	Team	Apps	(Gls)
1981–1982	Arda Kardzhali	–	(–)
1982–1983	Lokomotiv Sofia	8	(2)
1983–1984	Arda Kardzhali	–	(–)
1984–1985	Levski Sofia	7	(1)
1985–1989	Beroe Stara Zagora	94	(43)
1989–1990	Portimonense	13	(1)
1990	Quarteirense	6	(5)
1991	Union Berlin	10	(1)
1991–1992	Bursaspor	21	(8)
1992–1993	Konyaspor	10	(2)
Total		197+	(70+)
- * Club domestic league appearances and goals

Myumyun Kashmer (Bulgarian: Мюмюн Кашмер; born 20 January 1962), also known as Milan Kashmerov, is a Bulgarian former footballer who played as a forward.

== Honours ==
=== Club ===
Lokomotiv Sofia

- Bulgarian Cup: 1982

Levski Sofia

- A Group: 1984–85

Beroe Stara Zagora

- A Group: 1985–86
