= 1985–86 A Group =

42nd season of top-tier football league in Bulgaria

A Group
- Season: 1985–86
- Champions: Beroe (1st title)
- Relegated: Cherno More, Dunav
- European Cup: Beroe
- UEFA Cup: Trakia Plovdiv; CSKA
- Matches: 240
- Goals: 770 (3.21 per match)
- Top goalscorer: Atanas Pashev (30 goals)

The 1985–86 A Group was the 38th season of the A Football Group, the top Bulgarian professional league for association football clubs, since its establishment in 1948.

== Overview ==
It was contested by 16 teams, and Beroe Stara Zagora won the championship.

== League standings ==
Pos	Team	Pld	W	D	0–0	L	GF	GA	GD	Pts	Qualification or relegation
1	Beroe Stara Zagora (C)	30	20	3	1	6	55	36	+19	43	Qualification for European Cup first round
2	Trakia Plovdiv	30	18	5	1	6	82	38	+44	41	Qualification for UEFA Cup first round
3	Slavia Sofia	30	16	4	1	9	63	33	+30	36	
4	CSKA Sofia (Note: CSKA won the 1985–86 Cup of the Soviet Army and thus qualified for the 1986–87 UEFA Cup first round.)	30	16	2	0	12	62	37	+25	34	Qualification for UEFA Cup first round
5	Levski Sofia	30	14	5	1	10	55	39	+16	33	Qualification for Cup Winners' Cup first round
6	Sliven	30	12	7	1	10	46	48	−2	31	
7	Lokomotiv Plovdiv	30	14	3	0	13	51	57	−6	31	
8	Spartak Varna	30	11	8	1	10	31	32	−1	30	
9	Lokomotiv Sofia	30	12	5	1	12	47	45	+2	29	
10	Etar Veliko Tarnovo	30	12	5	0	13	52	58	−6	29	
11	Akademik Svishtov	30	11	4	0	15	39	54	−15	26	
12	Botev Vratsa	30	10	5	0	15	44	60	−16	25	
13	Pirin Blagoevgrad	30	8	5	1	16	34	49	−15	21	
14	Spartak Pleven	30	9	3	1	17	33	63	−30	21	
15	Cherno More Varna (R)	30	9	2	1	18	47	58	−11	20	Relegation to 1986–87 B Group
16	Dunav Ruse (R)	30	8	2	2	18	29	63	−34	18	Relegation to 1986–87 B Group

Source: 1985-86 Football retro-football.bg
Rules for classification: 1) points; 2) goal difference; 3) number of goals scored.
(C) Champion; (R) Relegated

== Results ==
Home \ Away	ASV	BSZ	BVR	CHM	CSK	DUN	ETA	LEV	LPL	LSO	PIR	SLA	SLI	SPL	SPV	TRA
Akademik Svishtov		1–0	3–1	5–3	1–0	2–0	1–1	3–1	2–3	2–0	1–0	1–0	1–1	4–1	1–1	1–1
Beroe Stara Zagora	4–0		4–1	3–0	1–0	1–0	3–1	1–0	2–1	2–0	2–0	1–0	1–1	1–0	1–0	3–2
Botev Vratsa	3–0	0–2		2–1	1–1	2–0	3–0	3–1	1–0	1–2	1–1	1–2	2–0	2–0	0–1	4–0
Cherno More	0–3	1–2	7–0		1–0	0–0	2–0	1–2	0–2	4–0	2–0	2–2	3–1	2–1	3–0	1–2
CSKA Sofia	6–1	4–2	5–1	4–2		6–0	2–0	1–2	3–0	0–3	2–1	0–1	3–0	6–1	2–0	2–3
Dunav Ruse	3–2	0–2	2–0	2–1	3–1		0–2	0–1	0–3	2–1	5–2	0–1	1–1	2–1	2–0	1–1
Etar Veliko Tarnovo	3–1	1–2	6–1	3–1	1–0	2–1		1–1	4–1	5–1	2–0	2–2	4–1	2–1	0–2	2–2
Levski Sofia	1–0	2–3	3–6	3–1	1–3	6–1	5–1		0–1	2–0	3–0	2–2	3–0	6–0	1–0	1–0
Lokomotiv Plovdiv	3–0	1–0	2–1	4–2	0–2	3–1	4–2	1–3		2–2	3–1	2–4	3–2	2–3	1–0	1–1
Lokomotiv Sofia	3–1	1–4	4–1	0–2	4–1	3–1	1–1	0–0	3–1		3–0	3–1	1–1	3–2	2–0	3–1
Pirin Blagoevgrad	1–0	3–2	1–1	2–1	1–2	5–0	6–1	1–0	1–0	1–1		0–4	1–1	3–1	1–1	0–0
Slavia Sofia	4–0	5–2	1–0	7–1	1–2	1–0	5–1	1–1	9–0	1–0	2–0		3–1	0–1	0–0	3–1
Sliven	2–0	0–0	3–2	1–0	1–0	5–0	3–1	1–1	4–2	1–1	3–1	4–0		4–2	2–1	0–3
Spartak Pleven	1–0	2–2	1–1	1–0	0–2	0–0	1–2	3–1	0–3	2–1	1–0	2–1	2–0		1–1	0–4
Spartak Varna	2–0	1–1	1–1	2–2	1–1	3–2	1–0	1–1	2–0	2–1	3–1	1–0	0–1	1–0		2–1
Trakia Plovdiv	5–2	8–1	6–1	4–1	3–1	5–0	4–1	3–1	2–2	1–0	1–0	2–0	6–1	7–2	3–1	

Source: A PFG (in Bulgarian)
Legend: Blue = home team win; Yellow = draw; Red = away team win.

== Champions ==
Beroe Stara Zagora

Goalkeepers
(Bulgaria) Ivko Ganchev	30	(0)
(Bulgaria) Valentin Grudev	1	(0)

Defenders
(Bulgaria) Tenyo Minchev	26	(4)
(Bulgaria) Kolyo Ganev	8	(0)
(Bulgaria) Iliya Iliev	30	(0)
(Bulgaria) Venelin Sivriev	27	(1)
(Bulgaria) Petko Tenev	20	(0)
(Bulgaria) Kancho Kasherov	29	(0)
(Bulgaria) Stoyko Stoykov	23	(0)
(Bulgaria) Hristo Belchev	8	(0)

Midfielders
(Bulgaria) Yordan Mitev	25	(7)
(Bulgaria) Plamen Lipenski	17	(0)
(Bulgaria) Stefan Dinev	21	(2)
(Bulgaria) Tanko Tanev	19	(2)
(Bulgaria) Stoyan Bonchev	27	(7)

Forwards
(Bulgaria) Myumyun Kashmer	29	(23)
(Bulgaria) Petko Marokov	10	(1)
(Bulgaria) Radko Kalaydzhiev	4	(1)
(Bulgaria) Vasil Dragolov	22	(7)

Manager
(Bulgaria) Evgeni Yanchovski

== Top scorers ==
Rank	Scorer	Club	Goals
1	(Bulgaria) Atanas Pashev	Trakia Plovdiv	30
2	(Bulgaria) Myumyun Kashmer	Beroe Stara Zagora	23
3	(Bulgaria) Mitko Argirov	Etar Veliko Tarnovo	20
4	(Bulgaria) Petar Aleksandrov	Slavia Sofia	18
4	(Bulgaria) Plamen Getov	Spartak Pleven	18
6	(Bulgaria) Mihail Valchev	Levski Sofia	16
7	(Bulgaria) Stoycho Mladenov	CSKA Sofia	15

== Attendances ==
#	Club	Average
1	Beroe	17,667
2	Levski	14,600
3	Trakia	12,800
4	Lokomotiv Plovdiv	12,267
5	Sliven	9,667
6	Pleven	9,167
7	CSKA Sofia	9,000
8	Pirin	8,533
9	Slavia Sofia	8,429
10	Varna	7,900
11	Dunav	7,846
12	Svishtov	7,400
13	Etar	6,200
14	Botev	5,380
15	Cherno More	5,313
16	Lokomotiv Sofia	5,200
