= Vutov =

Vutov is a Bulgarian surname. Notable people with the surname include:

- Antonio Vutov (born 1996), Bulgarian footballer
- Ivan Vutov (born 1944), Bulgarian football manager and player
- Vitomir Vutov (born 1971), Bulgarian footballer and coach
