= Wesley Dual =

Spanish footballer (born 2006)

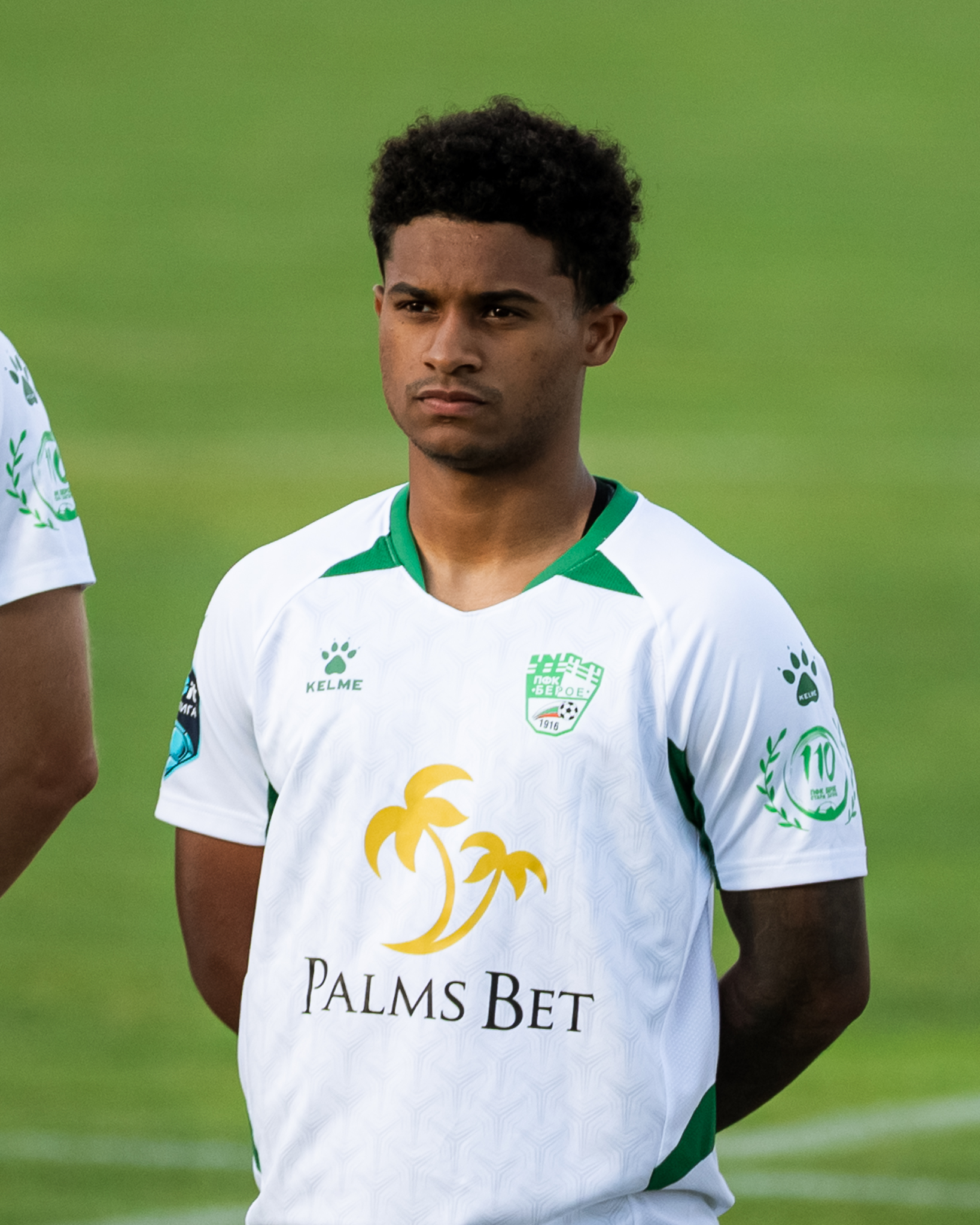

Personal information
- Full name: Wesley Dual da Rocha
- Date of birth: 15 January 2006 (age 20)
- Place of birth: Lleida, Spain
- Height: 1.71 m (5 ft 7 in)
- Position: Midfielder

Team information
- Current team: Beroe
- Number: 8

Youth career
- Damm
- 2019–2024: Barcelona
- 2024–2025: Palmeiras

Senior career*
Years	Team	Apps	(Gls)
2025–	Beroe	34	(2)

International career
- Spain U17
- * Club domestic league appearances and goals as of 31 October 2026

Wesley Dual da Rocha (born January 15, 2006) is a Spanish professional footballer who plays as a midfielder for Bulgarian First League club Beroe Stara Zagora.

== Early life ==
Dual is nicknamed "Wes". He is of Brazilian descent.

== Career ==
Dual has represented Spain internationally at youth level.

== Style of play ==
Dual mainly operates as a midfielder and has been described as "more of an interior midfielder but can also play as a pivot when needed and stands out for his dynamism and ability to cover every blade of grass on the pitch. Good at ball recovery, his positioning is also a strong facet".

== Personal life ==
Dual is a native of Lleida, Spain.
