= Ivko Ganchev =

Bulgarian footballer and manager

Personal information
- Full name: Ivko Ganchev Ivanov
- Date of birth: 21 July 1965 (age 61)
- Place of birth: Stara Zagora, Bulgaria
- Height: 1.86 m (6 ft 1 in)
- Position: Goalkeeper

Youth career
- 1976–1984: Beroe Stara Zagora

Senior career*
Years	Team	Apps	(Gls)
1984–1990	Beroe Stara Zagora	150	(0)
1990–1992	Slavia Sofia	30	(?)
1992–1999	Bursaspor	175	(1)
1999–2000	Çaykur Rizespor	28	(0)

International career
1993–1995	Bulgaria	3	(0)

Managerial career
- 2012: Beroe Stara Zagora
- 2021: Beroe Stara Zagora (goalkeeper coach)
- 2021–: Beroe Stara Zagora (director of football)
- * Club domestic league appearances and goals

Ivko Ganchev Ivanov (Bulgarian: Ивко Ганчев Иванов; born 21 July 1965 in Stara Zagora) is a former Bulgarian football goalkeeper. He ended his career at the end of 1999–2000 season. He started his manager career with his home town club Beroe Stara Zagora.

== Career ==
On the club level, Ganchev has played for Beroe Stara Zagora (1984–1989), Slavia Sofia (1989–1991), Bursaspor (1991–1999) and Çaykur Rizespor (1999–2000). For Bulgaria, he has been capped 3 times. Now he is the coach of Beroe Stara Zagora after being appointed in July 2012. He was formerly employed as assistant coach of Bursaspor.

== Honours ==
Beroe

- A Group: 1985–86

Individual

- Toulon Tournament Best Goalkeeper: 1986
