= Evgeni Yanchovski =

Bulgarian footballer

Personal information
- Full name: Evgeni Valev Yanchovski
- Date of birth: 5 September 1939 (age 87)
- Place of birth: Tarnava, Bulgaria
- Position: Midfielder

Senior career*
Years	Team	Apps	(Gls)
1959–1960	Levski Karlovo	?	(?)
1960–1974	Beroe	341	(32)

International career
1963-1968	Bulgaria	16	(1)

Managerial career
- 1979–1982: Chirpan
- 1982–1984: Sliven
- 1984–1985: Haskovo
- 1985–1987: Beroe
- 1987–1988: Spartak Varna
- 1988–1989: Chernomorets Burgas
- 1989–1990: Alki Larnaca
- 1991–1992: Rozova Dolina
- 1992–1993: Beroe Stara Zagora
- * Club domestic league appearances and goals

Olympic medal record

Representing Bulgaria

Men's football
Silver medal – second place	1968 Mexico City	Team competition

Evgeni Valev Yanchovski (Bulgarian: Евгени Валев Янчовски; born 5 September 1939) is a Bulgarian former football player and manager.

Yanchovski represented Bulgaria at the 1966 FIFA World Cup. He also played for Bulgaria at the 1968 Summer Olympics.

At the club level, he played for Levski Karlovo and then for Beroe Stara Zagora fromfrom 1960 to 1974, appearing in 341 matches and scoring 31 goals.

As a manager, he led Beroe to the championship title in the Bulgarian A PFG in 1986.

== Honours ==
=== Player ===
Beroe

- Balkans Cup (2): 1967–68; 1969

=== Manager ===
Beroe

- Bulgarian League: 1985–86
