= Cheikh Diamanka =

Senegalese footballer (born 2001)

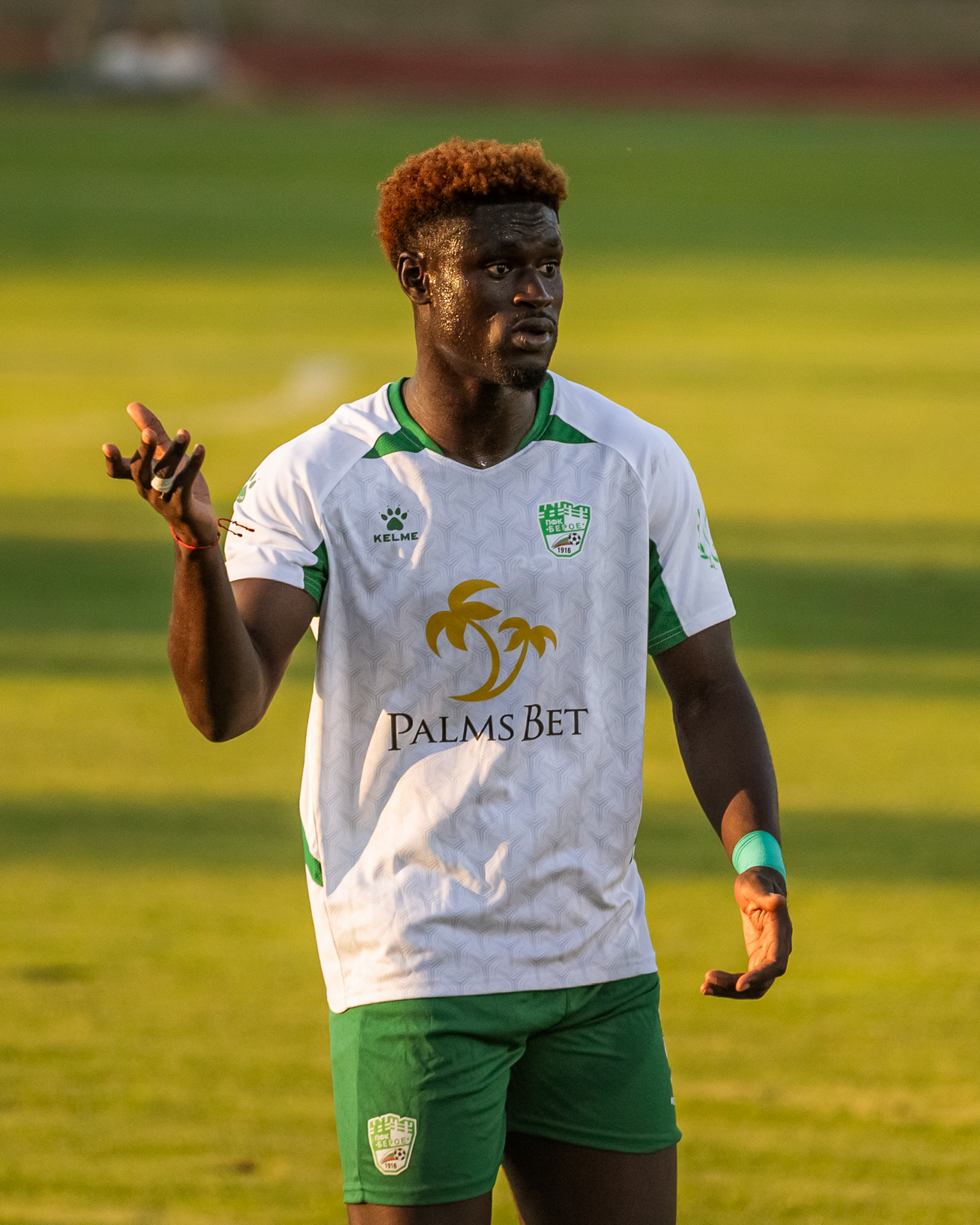

Personal information
- Full name: Cheikh Diamanka Senghor
- Date of birth: 20 January 2001 (age 25)
- Place of birth: Dakar, Senegal
- Height: 1.89 m (6 ft 2 in)
- Position: Forward

Team information
- Current team: Beroe Stara Zagora
- Number: 9

Youth career
- –2020: Elche
- 2018–2020: → Kelme (loan)

Senior career*
Years	Team	Apps	(Gls)
2020–2022	Elche Ilicitano	37	(4)
2022–2023	Coruchense	23	(5)
2023	Dessel Sport		
2024–2025	Hebar	30	(3)
2025	Fujieda MYFC	15	(1)
2025	→ Tochigi SC (loan)	4	(0)
2026	Mosta	13	(0)
2026–	Beroe Stara Zagora	12	(1)
- * Club domestic league appearances and goals as of 31 October 2026

Cheikh Diamanka Senghor (born 20 January 2001) is a Senegalese professional footballer who plays as a forward for Beroe Stara Zagora.

== Career ==
Diamanka started his career with Elche and spent two years on loan at Kelme. In October 2020, he made his senior debut playing in the Tercera Federación for Elche Ilicitano, starting in a 3–2 defeat to Eldense. In April 2021, he made the squad for a La Liga match for the first time, remaining as an unused substitute in Elche's 1–0 win over Levante. In summer 2022, Diamanka joined Campeonato de Portugal side Coruchense. In September 2023, he signed for Belgian Division 1 side Dessel Sport on a one-year deal. In February 2024, he joined Bulgarian First Professional Football League side Hebar. On 24 February 2024, he made his professional league debut, coming on as a substitute to score the winner in a 2–1 win over Lokomotiv Plovdiv. In December 2024, Diamanka joined J2 League club Fujieda MYFC. On 13 August 2025, Diamanka joined J3 League side Tochigi SC on loan until the end of the year. On 8 January 2026, Diamanka joined Maltese Premier League side Mosta on a free transfer. On 5 August 2026, Diamanka returned to Bulgaria to join Second League side Beroe Stara Zagora.

== Personal life ==
Born in Senegal, Diamanka also holds Spanish nationality.
