= Petko Petkov (footballer) =

Bulgarian footballer (1946–2020)

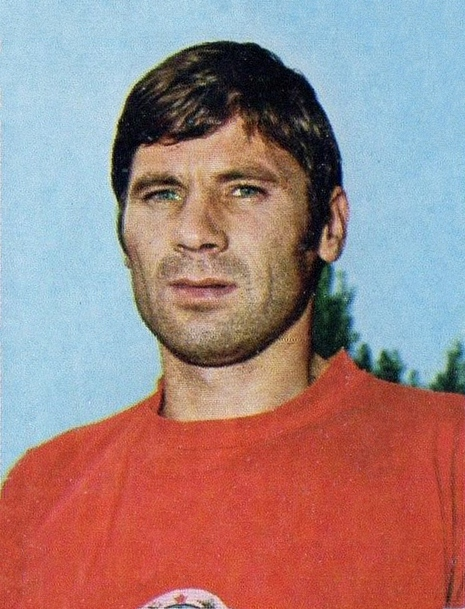
- Petko Petkov c. 1974

Personal information
- Date of birth: 3 August 1946
- Place of birth: Sinitevo, Bulgaria
- Date of death: 10 January 2020 (aged 73)
- Place of death: Stara Zagora, Bulgaria
- Height: 1.80 m (5 ft 11 in)
- Position: Forward

Senior career*
Years	Team	Apps	(Gls)
1963–1964	Rodopa Smolyan	?	(?)
1964–1965	Minyor Rudozem	?	(?)
1965–1967	Gorubso Madan	?	(?)
1968–1977	Beroe	263	(192)
1977–1978	Akademik Svishtov	20	(8)
1978–1980	Beroe	66	(32)
1981–1982	Austria Wien	51	(10)
1982–1983	Beroe	23	(9)

International career
1970–1980	Bulgaria	33	(5)

Managerial career
- 1983–1985: Beroe
- 1986–1987: Akademik Svishtov
- 1987–1989: Beroe
- * Club domestic league appearances and goals

Petko Petkov (Bulgarian: Петко Петков; 3 August 1946 – 10 January 2020) was a Bulgarian footballer who played as a forward, most notably for Beroe Stara Zagora. He is the club's record goalscorer in the top league with 144 goals in 260 matches.

== Career ==
In his career, Petkov played for Gorubso Madan, Beroe Stara Zagora and Austria Wien.

=== Beroe ===
For Beroe, he scored 144 goals in A PFG. This makes him the club's best goalscorer of all time in the top division. During the 1974–75 season, he scored the fantastic 53 goals in the second division, unbeaten record to this day.

For the Bulgaria national football team, he was capped 33 times, scoring 5 goals.

== Honours ==
=== Club ===
Beroe

- Balkans Cup (2): 1967–68; 1969

Austria Wien

- Austrian Bundesliga: 1980–81
- Austrian Cup: 1981–82

=== Individual ===
- Bulgarian League top scorer (2): 1973–74 (20 goals), 1975–76 (19 goals)
