= Tenyo Minchev =

Bulgarian footballer

Personal information
- Full name: Tenyo Tenev Minchev
- Date of birth: 3 March 1954 (age 72)
- Place of birth: Lyubenovo, Bulgaria
- Position: Defensive midfielder

Senior career*
Years	Team	Apps	(Gls)
1970–1972	Energetik Galabovo		
1973–1984	Beroe Stara Zagora	254	(15)
1985	Lokomotiv Stara Zagora		
1985–1987	Beroe Stara Zagora	54	(8)
1987–1988	Lokomotiv Stara Zagora		
1989	Krylia Sovetov	28	(0)

International career
1978–1980	Bulgaria	4	(0)
- * Club domestic league appearances and goals

Tenyo Tenev Minchev (Bulgarian: Теньо Тенев Минчев; born 3 March 1954) is a Bulgarian former footballer who played as a midfielder.

== Career ==
Tenyo Minchev started his career in Energetik Galabovo before moving to Beroe Stara Zagora in 1973. He became one of the key players and was team captain for 12 years. With Minchev's help, Beroe became champions in 1985–86 season.

After a short stint in Lokomotiv Stara Zagora, Tenyo Minchev moved to Soviet side Krylia Sovetov Kuybyshev. He became the first foreign player in Soviet football. After playing 28 matches for Krylia Sovetov, Minchev ended his career.

Minchev played 4 official and 3 unofficial matches for Bulgaria.

== Honours ==
- Bulgarian A PFG winner: 1985-86
- Balkans Cup winner: 1983, 1984
