= Ivan Vutov =

Bulgarian footballer

Ivan Vutov Иван Вутов
Personal information
- Full name: Ivan Tasev Vuto; Иван Тасев Вутов
- Date of birth: 19 March 1944 (age 82)
- Place of birth: Dermanci, Bulgaria
- Position: Midfielder

Senior career*
Years	Team	Apps	(Gls)
1962–1964	Minyor Pernik	43	(3)
1964–1966	Beroe	50	(2)
1966–1967	Levski Sofia	7	(0)
1967–1969	Botev Burgas	52	(2)
1969–1974	Beroe	111	(3)

Managerial career
- 1981–1982: Beroe
- 1986–1987: Naftex Burgas
- 1987–1989: Olympique Béja
- 1989–1990: Chernomorets Burgas
- 1990: Olympique Béja
- 1990–1991: Naftex Burgas
- 1992–1993: Levski Sofia
- 1995–1996: Beroe
- 1996–1997: Burkina Faso
- 1997–1998: Chernomorets Burgas
- 2001–2002: Beroe
- 2004–2005: Beroe
- 2005–2006: Minyor Radnevo
- 2008: Sur
- 2008–2009: Lokomotiv Plovdiv
- 2013–2014: Santos Ouagadougou
- 2016–2017: Botev Galabovo
- 2017–2018: Etar
- 2019–2020: Vereya
- * Club domestic league appearances and goals

Ivan Tasev Vutov (Bulgarian: Иван Тасев Вутов, born 19 March 1944) is a Bulgarian former football manager and former footballer.

As a footballer, he played as a midfielder for various teams in the Bulgarian First Professional Football League. A journeyman manager, he managed various clubs in Bulgaria, Tunisia, Oman, and Burkina Faso. He managed the Burkina Faso national team from 1996 to 1997.

== Honours ==
=== Coach ===
Levski Sofia

- Bulgarian Cup: 1991–92
- Bulgarian League: 1992–93
