= 1967–68 Balkans Cup =

Tournament details
- Country: Balkans
- Teams: 8

Final positions
- Champions: (Bulgaria) Beroe Stara Zagora
- Runners-up: (Bulgaria) Spartak Sofia

Tournament statistics
- Matches played: 26
- Goals scored: 73 (2.81 per match)

The 1967–68 Balkans Cup was an edition of the Balkans Cup, a football competition for representative clubs from the Balkan states. It was contested by 6 teams and Beroe Stara Zagora won the competition.

== Group Stage ==
=== Group A ===
Pos	Team	Pld	W	D	L	GF	GA	GR	Pts	Qualification
1	(Bulgaria) Beroe Stara Zagora (A)	6	5	0	1	9	6	1.500	10	Advances to finals
2	(Albania) Vllaznia Shkodër	6	3	1	2	9	6	1.500	7	
3	(Romania) Farul Constanța	6	3	0	3	10	9	1.111	6	
4	(Turkey) Gençlerbirligi	6	0	1	5	3	10	0.300	1	

Source: rsssf.com
Rules for classification: 1) points; 2) goal average; 3) number of goals scored
(A) Advance to a further round
23 December 1967

Vllaznia Shkodër (Albania)	4–0	(Bulgaria) Beroe Stara Zagora

Vojo Kushi, Shkodër

14 February 1968

Beroe Stara Zagora (Bulgaria)	2–0	(Albania) Vllaznia Shkodër

Beroe, Stara Zagora

6 March 1968

Gençlerbirligi (Turkey)	0–2	(Bulgaria) Beroe Stara Zagora
		Yanchovski 4'; Petko Petkov 17'

Ankara 19 Mayıs, Ankara

20 March 1968

Beroe Stara Zagora (Bulgaria)	1–0	(Turkey) Gençlerbirligi

Beroe, Stara Zagora

3 April 1968

Farul Constanța (Romania)	3–1	(Turkey) Gençlerbirligi
Iancu 21', 36'; Tufan 50'		Endersert 76'

Farul, Constanța

4 May 1968

Vllaznia Shkodër (Albania)	1–0	(Turkey) Gençlerbirligi
Dani 77'

Vojo Kushi, Shkodër

22 May 1968

Gençlerbirligi (Turkey)	1–2	(Romania) Farul Constanța
Endersert 86'		Tufan 24'; Sasu 73' (pen.)

Ankara 19 Mayıs, Ankara

2 June 1968

Gençlerbirligi (Turkey)	1–1	(Albania) Vllaznia Shkodër
Görür 57'		Memo 7'

Ankara 19 Mayıs, Ankara

12 June 1968

Vllaznia Shkodër (Albania)	2–1	(Romania) Farul Constanța

Vojo Kushi, Shkodër

19 June 1968

Beroe Stara Zagora (Bulgaria)	2–1	(Romania) Farul Constanța

Beroe, Stara Zagora

29 June 1968

Farul Constanța (Romania)	2–1	(Albania) Vllaznia Shkodër

Farul, Constanța

3 July 1968

Farul Constanța (Romania)	1–2	(Bulgaria) Beroe Stara Zagora

Farul, Constanța

=== Group B ===
Pos	Team	Pld	W	D	L	GF	GA	GR	Pts	Qualification
1	(Bulgaria) Spartak Sofia (A)	6	4	1	1	10	3	3.333	9	Advances to finals
2	(Socialist Federal Republic of Yugoslavia) Olimpija Ljubljana	6	2	3	1	10	6	1.667	7	
3	(Greece) AEK Athens	6	1	2	3	7	12	0.583	4	
4	(Turkey) Fenerbahçe	6	1	2	3	5	11	0.455	4	

Source: rsssf.com
Rules for classification: 1) points; 2) goal average; 3) number of goals scored
(A) Advance to a further round

14 February 1968

Fenerbahçe (Turkey)	1–1	(Socialist Federal Republic of Yugoslavia) Olimpija Ljubljana
Şen 79' (pen.)		Zagorc 25'

Şükrü Saracoğlu Stadium, Istanbul, Turkey

18 February 1968

Spartak Sofia (Bulgaria)	1–0	(Socialist Federal Republic of Yugoslavia) Olimpija Ljubljana

Rakovski Stadium, Sofia, Bulgaria

6 March 1968
15:30 EET (UTC+2)

AEK Athens (Greece)	0–0	(Socialist Federal Republic of Yugoslavia) Olimpija Ljubljana
	Report

AEK Stadium, Athens, Greece
Attendance: 6,302
Referee: Todor Gerov (Bulgaria)

3 April 1968

AEK Athens (Greece)	3–1	(Turkey) Fenerbahçe
Karafeskos 36' (pen.); Ventouris 38', 81'	Report	Aktuna 65' (pen.)

AEK Stadium, Athens, Greece
Attendance: 8,933
Referee: Josip Horvat (Yugoslavia)

6 May 1968

Olimpija Ljubljana (Socialist Federal Republic of Yugoslavia)	4–0	(Turkey) Fenerbahçe
Lazović 20', 28', 50'; Popivoda 82'

Bežigrad Stadium, Ljubljana, Yugoslavia

15 May 1968
17:00 EET

AEK Athens (Greece)	0–3	(Bulgaria) Spartak Sofia
	Report	Vasiliev 11'; Mitkov 43'; Tsvetkov 79'

AEK Stadium, Athens, Greece
Attendance: 6,460
Referee: Doğan Babacan (Turkey)

3 July 1968
17:30 EET

Olimpija Ljubljana (Socialist Federal Republic of Yugoslavia)	3–3	(Greece) AEK Athens
Ameršek 4'; Bečejac 27'; Rogič 87'	Report	Papaioannou 14'; Stamatiadis 60'; Pomonis 75'

Bežigrad Stadium, Ljubljana, Yugoslavia
Referee: Lado Jakše (Yugoslavia)

3 July 1968

Fenerbahçe (Turkey)	0–0	(Bulgaria) Spartak Sofia

Şükrü Saracoğlu Stadium, Istanbul, Turkey

7 August 1968

Olimpija Ljubljana (Socialist Federal Republic of Yugoslavia)	2–1	(Bulgaria) Spartak Sofia

Bežigrad Stadium, Ljubljana, Yugoslavia

14 August 1968

Spartak Sofia (Bulgaria)	3–0	(Turkey) Fenerbahçe
Gyonin 29', 85'; Nikolov 32'

Rakovski Stadium, Sofia, Bulgaria

28 August 1968

Spartak Sofia (Bulgaria)	2–1	(Greece) AEK Athens
Tsvetkov 28', 84'	Report	Ventouris 43'

Stadion Minyor, Pernik, Bulgaria
Referee: Dimitar Rumenchev (Bulgaria)

31 August 1968
16:15 EET

Fenerbahçe (Turkey)	3–0	(Greece) AEK Athens
Doğan 25'; Nunweiller 65'; Bartu 86'	Report

Ali Sami Yen Stadium, Istanbul, Turkey
Referee: Constantin Ghiță (Romania)

== Finals ==
Team 1	Agg.	Team 2	1st leg	2nd leg
Beroe Stara Zagora (Bulgaria)	6–4	(Bulgaria) Spartak Sofia	3–0	3–4

=== First leg ===
30 October 1968

Beroe Stara Zagora (Bulgaria)	3–0	(Bulgaria) Spartak Sofia
P. Petkov; Belchev

Beroe, Stara Zagora

=== Second leg ===
27 November 1968

Spartak Sofia (Bulgaria)	4–3	(Bulgaria) Beroe Stara Zagora

Rakovski, Sofia

Beroe Stara Zagora won 6–4 on aggregate.
