= Plamen Lipenski =

Bulgarian former football player (born 1960)

Personal information
- Date of birth: 30 March 1960 (age 66)
- Place of birth: Stara Zagora, Bulgaria
- Position: Attacking midfielder

Team information
- Current team: Beroe Stara Zagora (assistant coach)

Youth career
- ?–1978: Beroe Stara Zagora

Senior career*
Years	Team	Apps	(Gls)
1976–1981	Beroe Stara Zagora		
1981–1982	Akademik Sofia	8	(2)
1982–1986	Beroe Stara Zagora		
1986–1987	Akademik Svishtov	25	(8)
Total		248	(63)

International career
	Bulgaria	3	(0)

Managerial career
- 1992–1993: Beroe Stara Zagora (youth)
- 1993–1997: Olhanense
- 1997–1998: Belenenses
- 1998–2001: Imortal
- 2001–2003: Portimonense
- 2007–2008: CSKA Sofia (assistant coach)
- 2009–2012: Portimão (youth director)
- 2013–2016: Beroe Stara Zagora (fitness coach)
- 2016: Beroe Stara Zagora
- 2016: Beroe Stara Zagora
- 2019–2022: Beroe Stara Zagora (fitness coach)
- 2023–: Beroe Stara Zagora (assistant coach)
- * Club domestic league appearances and goals

Plamen Lipenski (Bulgarian: Пламен Липенски) (born 30 March 1960) is a Bulgarian former football player, and currently manager/fitness coach. He was part of the Bulgarian national team.

== Career ==
=== As a player ===
Plamen Lipenski has 196 Appearances and scored 46 goals for Beroe Stara Zagora.

=== As a manager ===
On 14 January 2013 Lipenski became the Fitness Coach of his youth club Beroe Stara Zagora and he was the head coach of the club between 7 April 2016 and 31 May 2016. He was victorious in his first game in charge of Beroe – a 3:1 win over Montana. On 20 October 2016, following Aleksandar Dimitrov's resignation, Lipenski was appointed again as caretaker manager of Beroe Stara Zagora.
