= 1969 Balkans Cup =

Tournament details
- Country: Balkans
- Teams: 6

Final positions
- Champions: (Bulgaria) Beroe Stara Zagora
- Runners-up: (Albania) Dinamo Tirana

Tournament statistics
- Matches played: 14
- Goals scored: 45 (3.21 per match)

The 1969 Balkans Cup was an edition of the Balkans Cup, a football competition for representative clubs from the Balkan states. It was contested by 6 teams and Beroe Stara Zagora won the trophy.

== Group Stage ==
=== Group A ===
Pos	Team	Pld	W	D	L	GF	GA	GR	Pts	Qualification
1	(Albania) Dinamo Tirana (A)	4	2	1	1	9	6	1.500	5	Advances to finals
2	(Romania) Universitatea Craiova	4	2	0	2	8	5	1.600	4	
3	(Socialist Federal Republic of Yugoslavia) OFK Bor	4	1	1	2	5	11	0.455	3	

Source: rsssf.com
Rules for classification: 1) points; 2) goal average; 3) number of goals scored
(A) Advance to a further round
9 April 1969

OFK Bor (Socialist Federal Republic of Yugoslavia)	2–0	(Romania) Universitatea Craiova

Stadion kraj Pirita, Bor

7 May 1969

Dinamo Tirana (Albania)	2–0	(Romania) Universitatea Craiova

Dinamo Stadium, Tirana

21 May 1969

Universitatea Craiova (Romania)	5–0	(Socialist Federal Republic of Yugoslavia) OFK Bor
Neagu 16'; Oblemenco 27', 60'; Martinovici 67', 73'

Central Stadium, Craiova
Attendance: 20,000
Referee: Vangelis Pazaropoulos (Greece)

18 June 1969

Universitatea Craiova (Romania)	3–1	(Albania) Dinamo Tirana
Neagu 26'; Oblemenco 31', 68'		Cutra 78'

Central Stadium, Craiova
Attendance: 20,000

August 1969

OFK Bor (Socialist Federal Republic of Yugoslavia)	2–2	(Albania) Dinamo Tirana

Stadion kraj Pirita, Bor

1969

Dinamo Tirana (Albania)	4–1	(Socialist Federal Republic of Yugoslavia) OFK Bor

Dinamo Stadium, Tirana

=== Group B ===
Pos	Team	Pld	W	D	L	GF	GA	GR	Pts	Qualification
1	(Bulgaria) Beroe Stara Zagora (A)	4	2	2	0	7	3	2.333	6	Advances to finals
2	(Turkey) PTT Ankara	4	1	1	2	8	8	1.000	3	
3	(Greece) Pierikos	4	1	1	2	4	8	0.500	3	

Source: rsssf.com
Rules for classification: 1) points; 2) goal average; 3) number of goals scored
(A) Advance to a further round
26 March 1969

Pierikos (Greece)	1–1	(Bulgaria) Beroe Stara Zagora
		P. Petkov

Katerini Stadium, Katerini

9 April 1969

Beroe Stara Zagora (Bulgaria)	1–0	(Greece) Pierikos
Belchev

Beroe Stadium, Stara Zagora

28 May 1969

PTT Ankara (Turkey)	4–0	(Greece) Pierikos
Kocaeli 14'; Mesçi 23', 84'; Katırcıoğlu 68' (pen.)

PTT, Ankara

4 June 1969

Pierikos (Greece)	3–2	(Turkey) PTT Ankara
Chrysargyris 11', 14', 35'		Ünal 32'; Mesçi 47'

Katerini Stadium, Katerini

15 June 1969

Beroe Stara Zagora (Bulgaria)	3–0	(Turkey) PTT Ankara
P. Petkov; Yanchovski; V. Ivanov

Beroe Stadium, Stara Zagora

27 August 1969

PTT Ankara (Turkey)	2–2	(Bulgaria) Beroe Stara Zagora
Kocaeli 30'; Köse 81'		Kirov 4'; Dachev 85'

PTT, Ankara

== Finals ==
Team 1	Agg.	Team 2	1st leg	2nd leg
Dinamo Tirana (Albania)	1–3	(Bulgaria) Beroe Stara Zagora	1–0	0–3^{1}

=== First leg ===
22 October 1969

Dinamo Tirana (Albania)	1–0	(Bulgaria) Beroe Stara Zagora
Ishka

Dinamo Stadium, Tirana

=== Second leg ===
29 October 1969

Beroe Stara Zagora (Bulgaria)	3–0 Awarded^{1}	(Albania) Dinamo Tirana
N. Ivanov 20'

Beroe Stadium, Stara Zagora
Attendance: 13,000

Beroe Stara Zagora won 3–1 on aggregate.

Notes

- Note 1: Dinamo Tirana walked off when a penalty was awarded to Beroe Stara Zagora, while the score was at 1–0.
