= PFC Beroe Stara Zagora =

Bulgarian football club

Beroe Stara Zagora
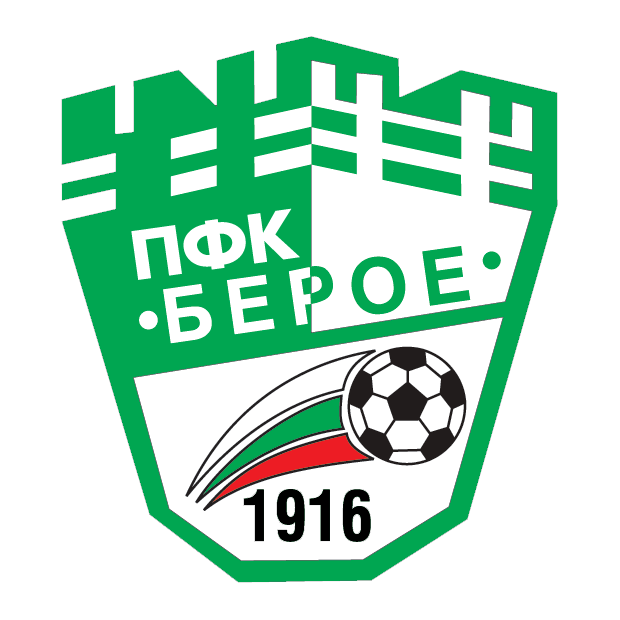
- Full name: Професионален Футболен Клуб Берое Стара Загора (Professional Football Club Beroe Stara Zagora)
- Nicknames: Зелените (The Greens), Берое Хуниорс (Beroe Juniors)
- Founded: 6 May 1916; 110 years ago as Vereya
- Ground: Stadion Beroe
- Capacity: 12,000
- Owner: CRD Sport
- Chairman: Hernan Banato
- Head coach: Ahmed Hikmet
- League: Second League
- 2025–26: First League, 14th of 16 (relegated)
- Website: beroe.bg
Home colours	Away colours

Professional Football Club Beroe Stara Zagora, better known as just Beroe (Bulgarian: Берое), is a Bulgarian professional association football club based in Stara Zagora, that competes in the Second League, second division of the Bulgarian football league system. The club was founded in 1916 under the name Vereya. The club's colours are green and white.

Since then the home ground of Beroe has been the homonymous Stadion Beroe in Stara Zagora with a seating capacity of 12,128. Beroe were the 1986 champions of Bulgaria and they also won the Bulgarian Cup twice in 2010 and 2013. In terms of international achievements, Beroe hold the record for Balkans Cups titles, having won the tournament four times. The club's most noted and successful player is Petko Petkov, 2 times A Group Top Scorer: 1974 (with 20 goals) and 1976 (with 19 goals).

== History ==
100 year anniversary of the club postage stamp.

Football was played in Stara Zagora as early as 1916, however with no organized championship in Bulgaria until the late 1920s, numerous clubs enjoyed regional success in those early years for the game in both the city and Bulgaria itself. Beroe can trace its roots back to 4 May 1924, when it was founded as Beroya, after the merger of two other clubs – Borislav and Rekord.

The club withstood the almost constant chaos and strife of the times, often caused by numerous shifts in the political regimes of Bulgaria, and despite many mergers and name changes throughout the first four decades of its history, it is constantly among the top 3 clubs in the city. It has also often been the platform for attempts to unite all the clubs in Stara Zagora, which foreshadowed its role and meaning for the city in the years to come.

The establishment of an organized league to determine the champion of Bulgaria in the late 40s coincided with the consolidation of football in Stara Zagora, the city finally seeing a one single strong club emerge to represent it at the highest level of Bulgarian football. That club was Beroe, at first bearing the names of Udarnik and Botev, before finally restoring its old name in 1959.

=== Successful years 1968–1980 ===
1968 marked the beginning of Beroe's golden age. During the summer transfer period, the forward Petko Petkov joined the club. In the next 12 years he scored 144 goals for the club in A Group. Beroe became all-powerful, winning the Balkans Cup in 1968 (beating in the final Spartak Sofia with a 6–4 on aggregate) and 1969 (beating Dinamo Tirana with a 4–0 on aggregate). However in 1970 the team was relegated after being excluded from the championship after 18 rounds due to crowd trouble in the match with Levski.

Bouncing back after a year, season 1971–72 in the domestic league was very successful for the team, which finished 3rd, and qualified for the UEFA Cup. The club's first participation in UEFA Cup was also promising, with Beroe eliminating the Austrian Austria Wien (7–0 and 3–1) and the Hungarian Honvéd (3–0 and 0–1) respectively and reaching the third round (but being knocked out by the Yugoslav OFK Beograd).

In season 1973–74 Beroe reach the quarter-finals of the Cup Winners' Cup: after eliminating the Luxembourg Fola Esch and the Basques of Athletic Bilbao, they were stopped in DDR by 1. FC Magdeburg (2–0 and 1–1).

Beroe have had some success in Europe, such as the 1–0 win over Juventus in a Cup Winners' Cup first-leg in 1979 and a 3–0 win over Athletic Bilbao in 1973. Moreover, Beroe is one of the two Bulgarian football clubs that has a positive record of the matches played in European club competitions.

=== Champions 1980–1995 ===
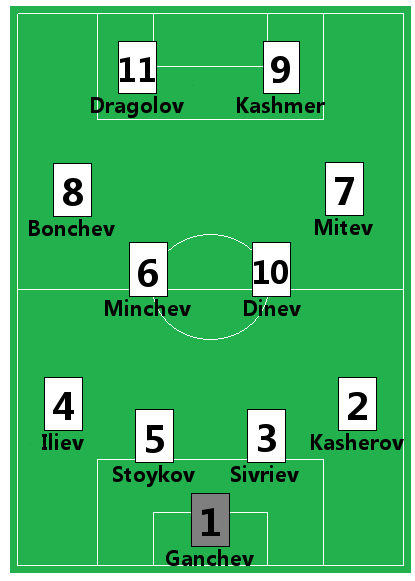
The champions team

In 1982 and 1984 Beroe won the Balkans Cup for the third and fourth times.

In 1986, the team led by the coach Evgeni Yanchovski won the Bulgarian title, the first in the club's history. Beroe finished the season with 43 points (after 20 wins, 4 draws and 6 losses). Beroe played in the 1986–87 UEFA European Champions Cup where they were eliminated in the first round to Dynamo Kyiv of the Soviet Union after 1–1 at Beroe Stadium and 0–2 loss in Kyiv.

The 1990s would see a gradual decline as Beroe were relegated to B Group in season 1994–95, finishing in last place with twelve points.

=== Downfall of the mid 90s, ups and downs again 1995–2008 ===
The advent of democracy in Bulgaria ushered a new period of chaos and economical hardship for the country, and that didn't pass by Beroe. Nevertheless, despite several seasons of crisis the club again withstood the test of time, and despite needing a helpful merger with another team – Olimpik (Teteven) – remained a key player on the Bulgarian football scene.

The first two seasons back in top division saw Beroe fight relegation, with safety being achieved by second-half runs. In 2001–02 season the team again relegated.

In the autumn of 2007 the actual majority shareholder of Professional Football Club Beroe JSCo Nikolay Banev gave up the financial support of the team. In spite of that, the team demonstrated good football in most of the games. On 10 January 2008 23 players and 3 coaches terminated their contracts with the club after a planned sale of the shares had failed.

Beroe got out of trouble on 3 February 2008, when the Beroe veterans’ club and the national fanclub, assisted by lawyer Damian Georgiev initiated, through related firms, insolvency proceedings in respect of the club in the Regional Court of Stara Zagora. The appointed administrator Elka Petrova transferred all the assets and liabilities of the club to a newly established joint-stock company Professional Football Club Beroe Stara Zagora JSCo.

The new entity succeeded Professional Football Club Beroe JSCo as regard of the license, the membership in the Bulgarian Football Union and the running of the football team itself.

In the summer of 2009 due to the world economic crisis most of the shareholders left the club due to financial problems. The club's main sponsor Brikel JSCo transferred its shares to Beroe veterans’ club and the national fanclub, who appointed a new board of directors. It consists of Damyan Georgiev – Chairman, Genyo Petrov – Executive Director and Tsvetelin Zhoevski.

=== Winning the Cup 2009–10 and 2012–13 ===
In the 2007–08 season Beroe lost their place in A Group, due to a controversial match between Belasitsa Petrich and Marek Dupnitsa in the last round of the season. In the very next season, however, Beroe won first place in B Group and returned to the top flight. At that time Ilian Iliev had already been manager of the club for the last 2 years. In the year to follow, Beroe achieved its best season in over 20 years, beating all of the main competitors for the Bulgarian Cup. Beroe eliminated CSKA Sofia in the quarter-finals, which paved the way for them to obtain the trophy, winning against second-division Chernomorets Pomorie 1–0 in the final at Lovech Stadium. The winning goal was scored dramatically in the last seconds of the added time by Beroe's former youth player Doncho Atanasov, who also went on to become top goalscorer of the tournament with 4 goals. Beroe became one of the only two Bulgarian teams that have won the cup without succeeding any goals. This success led to Ilian Iliev being awarded with the Coach of the Season award, as well as Ivo Ivanov (defender) being proclaimed best defender in A Group for 2009. Besides him other players that played a main role throughout the season were Iskren Pisarov, Georgi Andonov, Zdravko Iliev, Slavi Zhekov, Dian Genchev. One of the players with most matches in A Group for all times Kostadin Vidolov ended up his career mid-season with Beroe and went on to become a coach for Beroe's second team.

Beroe started 2010–11 season with the debut of the team in the UEFA Europa League. Beroe entered the competition in the third qualifying round and faced the Austrian side Rapid Wien. The game in Bulgaria ended in a 1–1 draw. Rapid Wien won the rematch with 3–0 putting an end to the international campaign of the Bulgarian team.

Beroe started 2012–13 season in Bulgarian Cup eliminating Akademik Svishtov in the second round. In the quarter-finals Beroe eliminated Lokomotiv (Mezdra) with aggregate result of 8–1, and then Pirin (Gotse Delchev) in the quarter-finals and Slavia Sofia in the semi-finals. In the final match at Lovech Stadium in Lovech against Levski Sofia, the result after 90 minutes was 3–3. After Beroe had taken the lead with 3–1 in the 80th minute, Levski Sofia with 10 men restored the tie, after Hristo Yovov received a second yellow card in the end of the first half. At the penalty shoot-out Levski Sofia scored just 1 from 4 penalties and Beroe, 3 of 5 which meant that Beroe had won the cup for the second time in the club's history.

=== CRD Sport takeover ===
In the summer of 2023, American player agency CRD Sport is the new owner of Bulgarian top tier club Beroe Stara Zagora. CRD has acquired 100% of the club’s shares. This came after several years of financial problems at the club. Argentinian Gustavo Aragolaza was announced as the new coach for the 2023–24 season.

== Shirt sponsors and manufacturers ==
The centenary crest used during the 2016–17 season.

Beroes colours are green and white.

Period	Kit manufacturer	Shirt Sponsor
1924–82	None	None
1982–83	(Germany) Puma	None
1983–86	None	None
1986–91	(Germany) Adidas	None
1991–92	(United States) Nike	CEBI
1992–95	Unknown	CEBI
1995–04	Unknown	None
2004–06	(Germany) Uhlsport	AKB Fores
2006–07	(Germany) Jako	AKB Fores
2007–08	(Germany) Uhlsport	AKB Fores
2008–09	(Bulgaria) Tomy Sport	Stara Zagora
2009–10	(Bulgaria) GUPA	Stara Zagora
2010–11	(Bulgaria) GUPA	Bulsatcom
2011–13	(Germany) Uhlsport	Bulsatcom
2013–15	(Spain) Joma	None
2015–22	(Germany) Uhlsport	REFAN
2022–23	(Germany) Jako	Efbet
2023–24	(Canada) Dryworld	Efbet
2024–26	(United States) Nike	8888.bg
2026–	(Spain) Kelme	PalmsBet

== Honours ==
=== Domestic ===
- First League:
  - Winners (1): 1985–86
- Bulgarian Cup:
  - Winners (2): 2009–10, 2012–13
- Bulgarian Supercup:
  - Winners (1): 2013
- Second League:
  - Winners (9 - Record): 1953, 1956, 1957, 1959–60, 1970–71, 1974–75, 1982–83, 2003–04, 2008–09

=== European ===
- European Cup/Champions League
  - Round of 32 (1): 1986–87
- UEFA Cup/UEFA Europa League
  - 1/8 final (1): 1972–73
  - 1/16 final (1): 1980–81
- Cup Winners' Cup
  - 1/4 final (1): 1973–74
  - 1/8 final (1): 1979–80
- Balkans Cup
  - Winners (4 - Record): 1967–68, 1969, 1981–83, 1983–84

== Players ==
=== Current squad ===
As of 25 October 2026

Note: Flags indicate national team as defined under FIFA eligibility rules; some limited exceptions apply. Players may hold more than one non-FIFA nationality.

No.	Pos.	Nation	Player
1	GK	BUL	Ivan Goshev
2	DF	BUL	Lachezar Mihaylov
3	DF	BUL	Kaloyan Rusenov
4	DF	BUL	Denis Dinev
5	DF	BUL	Martin Hristov
6	DF	BUL	Ivaylo Mitev
7	FW	BUL	Simeon Veshev
8	MF	ESP	Wesley Dual
9	FW	SEN	Cheikh Diamanka
10	FW	ESP	Ismael Ferrer (captain)
11	FW	BUL	Miroslav Georgiev

No.	Pos.	Nation	Player
12	GK	BUL	Andrean Argirov
13	GK	BUL	Kristiyan Filipov
17	DF	BUL	Georgi Valchev
18	MF	BUL	Stilyan Rusenov
19	MF	BUL	Daniel Yanev
20	FW	BUL	Zapro Dinev (on loan from Lokomotiv Plovdiv)
21	MF	BUL	Nikola Bandev
22	FW	ARG	Giuliano Bertino
23	MF	ESP	Hamza El Yahyaoui
24	DF	BUL	Hristo Mitev
30	FW	BUL	Ivo Kazakov

For recent transfers, see Transfers winter 2025–26 and Transfers summer 2026.

=== Out on loan ===
Note: Flags indicate national team as defined under FIFA eligibility rules; some limited exceptions apply. Players may hold more than one non-FIFA nationality.

No. / Pos. / Nation / Player; — / GK / BRA / Arthur Motta (at Qabala until 30 June 2027)	No. / Pos. / Nation / Player; — / FW / DOM / Juanca Pineda (at Sheriff Tiraspol until 30 June 2027)

=== Foreign players ===
Up to twenty foreign nationals can be registered and given a squad number for the first team in the Bulgarian First League, however only five non-EU nationals can be used during a match day. Those non-EU nationals with European ancestry can claim citizenship from the nation their ancestors came from. If a player does not have European ancestry he can claim Bulgarian citizenship after playing in Bulgaria for 5 years.

EU Nationals

- (Spain) Ismael Ferrer

EU Nationals (Dual citizenship)

- (Senegal) (Spain) Cheikh Diamanka
- (Spain) (Morocco) Hamza El Yahyaoui
- (Spain) (Brazil) Wesley Dual
- (Argentina) (Italy) Giuliano Bertino

Non-EU/EEA Nationals

== European record ==
=== Matches ===
Season	Competition	Round	Club	Home	Away	Aggregate
1967–68	Balkans Cup	Group A	Vllaznia Shkodër	0–4	2–0	1st
1967–68	Balkans Cup	Group A	(Turkey) Gençlerbirliği	2–0	1–0	1st
1967–68	Balkans Cup	Group A	Farul Constanța	2–1	2–1	1st
1967–68	Balkans Cup	Final	(Bulgaria) Spartak Sofia	3–0	3–4	6–3
1969	Balkans Cup	Group B	(Greece) Pierikos	1–1	1–0	1st
1969	Balkans Cup	Group B	(Turkey) Ankaraspor	3–0	2–2	1st
1969	Balkans Cup	Final	Dinamo Tirana	0–1	3–0 ^{1}	3–1
1970	Balkans Cup	Group A	(Greece) Egaleo	2–0	4–2	1st
1970	Balkans Cup	Group A	(Turkey) Eskişehirspor	1–0	1–3	1st
1970	Balkans Cup	Final	**Partizani Tirana**	1–1	0–3 ^{1}	1–4
1972–73	UEFA Cup	1/32 final	Austria Wien	7–0	3–1	10–1
1972–73	UEFA Cup	1/16 final	(Hungary) Honvéd	3–0	0–1	3–1
1972–73	UEFA Cup	1/8 final	(Socialist Federal Republic of Yugoslavia) OFK Beograd	0–0	1–3	1–3
1973–74	UEFA Cup Winners' Cup	1/16 final	(Luxembourg) Fola Esch	7–0	4–1	11–1
1973–74	UEFA Cup Winners' Cup	1/8 final	(Spain) Athletic Bilbao	3–0	0–1	3–1
1973–74	UEFA Cup Winners' Cup	1/4 final	(East Germany) **1. FC Magdeburg**	0–2	1–1	1–3
1979–80	UEFA Cup Winners' Cup	1/16 final	(Poland) Arka Gdynia	2–3	2–0	4–3
1979–80	UEFA Cup Winners' Cup	1/8 final	(Italy) Juventus	1–0	0–3 (a.e.t.)	1–3
1980–81	UEFA Cup	1/32 final	(Turkey) Fenerbahçe	1–0	2–1	3–1
1980–81	UEFA Cup	1/16 final	(Socialist Federal Republic of Yugoslavia) Radnički Niš	0–1	1–2	1–3
1981–83	Balkans Cup	Group A	(Turkey) Galatasaray	2–1	3–0 ^{1}	1st
1981–83	Balkans Cup	Group A	Steaua București	2–0	2–3	1st
1981–83	Balkans Cup	Final	Tirana	3–0	3–1	6–1
1983–84	Balkans Cup	Group A	Argeș Pitești	2–4	2–1	1st
1983–84	Balkans Cup	Group A	(Turkey) Galatasaray	4–2	1–0	1st
1984–85	Balkans Cup	1/4 final	Argeș Pitești	4–1	0–4	4–5
1986–87	UEFA European Cup	1/16 final	(Soviet Union) Dynamo Kyiv	1–1	0–2	1–3
1992–93	Balkans Cup	1/4 final	(Albania) Teuta Durrës	0–1	1–1 (a.e.t.)	1–2
2010–11	UEFA Europa League	3QR	(Austria) Rapid Wien	1–1	0–3	1–4
2013–14	UEFA Europa League	2QR	(Israel) Hapoel Tel Aviv	1–4	2–2	3–6
2015–16	UEFA Europa League	1QR	(Lithuania) Atlantas	3–1	2–0	5–1
2015–16	UEFA Europa League	2QR	(Denmark) Brøndby	0–1	0–0	0–1
2016–17	UEFA Europa League	1QR	(Bosnia and Herzegovina) Radnik Bijeljina	0–0	2–0	2–0
2016–17	UEFA Europa League	2QR	(Finland) HJK	1–1	0–1	1–2

^{1} ex officio the team doesn't come or leave the field.

Notes

- Clubs which ultimately won the tournament in that same season are indicated in **bold**
- 1983–84 Balkans Cup Winner decided on group stage
- QR: Qualifying Round

Competition	S	P	W	D	L	GF	GA	GD
UEFA Champions League / European Cup	1	2	0	1	1	1	3	– 2
UEFA Europa League / UEFA Cup	6	22	8	6	8	30	23	+ 7
UEFA Cup Winners' Cup / Cup Winners' Cup	2	10	5	1	4	20	11	+ 9
Balkans Cup	7	34	21	4	9	54	42	+ 12
**Total**	**16**	**68**	**34**	**12**	**22**	**105**	**79**	**+ 26**

=== Club coefficients ===
This is the current 2016–17 UEFA coefficient:

Rank	Team	Coefficient
270	(Scotland) Hibernian	4.785
271	(Scotland) Dundee United	4.785
272	(Norway) Aalesunds	4.665
273	(Albania) Kukësi	4.633
274	(Slovenia) Olimpija Ljubljana	4.625
**275**	(Bulgaria) **Beroe Stara Zagora**	**4.625**
276	(Bulgaria) Botev Plovdiv	4.625
277	(Cyprus) Ermis Aradippou	4.610
278	(Malta) Valletta	4.550
279	(Azerbaijan) Khazar Lankaran	4.550
280	(Serbia) Čukarički	4.480

- Full list

=== Club world ranking ===
These are the IFFHS club's points as of 7 January 2016:

Rank	Team	Pointsdie
142	(Portugal) Belenenses	108,00
142	(Slovakia) Slovan Bratislava	108,00
142	(Tunisia) CS Sfaxien	108,00
146	(Greece) Panathinaikos	107,00
146	(Sweden) Malmö FF	107,00
**148**	(Bulgaria) **Beroe Stara Zagora**	**106,50**
148	(South Africa) Orlando Pirates	106,50
150	(Denmark) Brøndby	106,00
150	(Paraguay) Cerro Porteño	106,00
152	(Malaysia) Johor Darul Ta'zim	105,50
153	(Colombia) Deportes Tolima	104,00

- Full list

== Stadium ==
Beroe Stadium is situated in the northwestern part of Stara Zagora near the biggest park of the city – Ayazmoto, which is the biggest sport facility of the team. The team has also three training grounds, the Beroe stadium base includes also tennis facilities and covered training hall. Built in 1959, the stadium is currently being renovated and has around 13,000 seating places, most of which are covered. The stadium has its own gymnastics, acrobatics and boxing hall. There is also a table-tennis facility. The stadium's overall capacity is about 15,000. The Beroe stadium has the fastest athletics lane and was often used for such competitions. The biggest attendance was in 1986 when the team won the championship title and more than 40,000 spectators were celebrating together with the players.

== Supporters and rivalries ==
The club has very strong support in the country. Their group is called Zara Boys.

Beroe's main rival is Botev Plovdiv. The match between these two teams is called Thracian Derby. They also have a strong rivalry with the two most popular teams in the country – Levski Sofia and CSKA Sofia. Other teams that are in bad relations with Beroe are Lokomotiv Plovdiv and especially Neftochimic Burgas.

The only team with which fans Zara Boys have a strong friendship is Etar Veliko Tarnovo.

== Statistics and Records ==
Evgeni Yanchovski holds Beroe's overall appearance record – he played 341 matches over the course of 14 seasons from 1960 to 1974. This is also the record for League appearances. Beroe's all-time leading scorer is Petko Petkov, who scored 144 goals while at the club from 1968 to 1980. Beroe's biggest victory is 8–0 in A Group against Minyor Pernik in 1973–74 and Chernomorets Burgas Sofia in 2006–07. Beroe's 7–0 defeat of Austria Wien in 1972 was its largest Europe win. Beroe's heaviest defeat, 2–10, came against CSKA Sofia in 1991–92.

- Players in **bold** are currently playing for the team. Statistic is correct as of match played 27 May 2025.

**Most league appearances for the club**

#	Name	Apps
1	(Bulgaria) Evgeni Yanchovski	341
2	(Bulgaria) Tenyo Minchev	308
3	(Bulgaria) Hristo Todorov	280
4	(Bulgaria) Todor Krastev	263
5	(Bulgaria) Petko Petkov	259
6	(Bulgaria) Kancho Kasherov	253
7	(Bulgaria) Venelin Sivriev	245
8	(Bulgaria) Jordan Mitev	238
9	(Bulgaria) Ivo Ivanov	237
10	(Bulgaria) Boris Kirov	227
=	(Bulgaria) Veselin Penev	227

**Most league goals for the club**

#	Name	Gls
1	(Bulgaria) Petko Petkov	144
2	(Bulgaria) Petar Zhekov	101
3	(Bulgaria) Jordan Mitev	68
4	(Bulgaria) Vasil Dragolov	58
=	(Bulgaria) Martin Kamburov	58
6	(Bulgaria) Georgi Belchev	52
7	(Bulgaria) Myumyun Kashmer	50
8	(Bulgaria) Stoycho Mladenov	42
9	(Bulgaria) Georgi Andonov	39
=	(Bulgaria) Georgi Stoyanov	39
10	(Bulgaria) Radko Kalaidjiev	37

**Bulgarian league top scorer with the club**

Year	Name	Goals
1967	(Bulgaria) Petar Zhekov	21
1968	(Bulgaria) Petar Zhekov	31
1974	(Bulgaria) Petko Petkov	19
1976	(Bulgaria) Petko Petkov	18
1978	(Bulgaria) Stoycho Mladenov	21
2020	(Bulgaria) Martin Kamburov	18
2025	(Argentina) Santiago Godoy	18

== Managers ==
- (Bulgaria) Panayot Tanev (1953)
- (Bulgaria) Borislav Asparuhov (1954)
- (Bulgaria) Panayot Tanev (1955–59)
- (Bulgaria) Borislav Milenov (1959)
- (Bulgaria) Ivan Radoev (1959–64)
- (Bulgaria) Anastas Kovachev (1964–65)
- (Bulgaria) Manol Manolov (1965–66)
- (Bulgaria) Krum Milev (1966–67)
- (Bulgaria) Hristo Mladenov (1967–69)
- (Bulgaria) Anastas Kovachev (1969–70)
- (Bulgaria) Dimitar Grigorov (1970–71)
- (Bulgaria) Hristo Mladenov (1971–72)
- (Bulgaria) Lozan Kotsev (1972–73)
- (Bulgaria) Ivan Tanev (1973–74)
- (Bulgaria) Hristo Mladenov (1974–76)
- (Bulgaria) Georgi Berkov (1976)
- (Bulgaria) Ivan Manolov (1976–77)
- (Bulgaria) Ivan Tanev (1977–81)
- (Bulgaria) Vasil Ivanov (1981)
- (Bulgaria) Ivan Vutov (1981–82)
- (Bulgaria) Georgi Belchev (1982–83)
- (Bulgaria) Petko Petkov (1983–85)
- (Bulgaria) Evgeni Yanchovski (1985–87)
- (Bulgaria) Petko Petkov (1987–90)
- (Bulgaria) Panayot Panayotov (1990)
- (Bulgaria) Boris Angelov (1990–92)
- (Bulgaria) Petko Petkov (1992)
- (Bulgaria) Evgeni Yanchovski (1992–93)
- (Bulgaria) Tenyo Minchev (1993–95)
- (Bulgaria) Ivan Vutov (1995)
- (Serbia) Dragoljub Bekvalac (1999–00)
- (Bulgaria) Ventsislav Kepov (2000)
- (Bulgaria) Petko Petkov (2000–01)
- (Bulgaria) Tsvetomir Parvanov (2001)
- (Bulgaria) Ivan Vutov (2001)
- (Bulgaria) Ilia Iliev (2002)
- (Bulgaria) Venelin Sivriev (2002–03)
- (Bulgaria) Asparuh Nikodimov (2003–04)
- (Bulgaria) Ivan Vutov (2004–05)
- (Croatia) Hans Kodrić (2005) match record: 2-2-2
- (Bulgaria) Petko Petkov (2005–06)
- (Bulgaria) Ilian Iliev (2006–07)
- (Bulgaria) Eduard Eranosyan (2007)
- (Bulgaria) Radoslav Zdravkov (2007)
- (Bulgaria) Nikolay Demirev (2007)
- (Bulgaria) Ilian Iliev (1 February 2008 – 12 July 2012) 38-27-44
- (Bulgaria) Ivko Ganchev (1 July 2012 – 12 Oct 2012)
- (Bulgaria) Petar Hubchev (18 October 2012 – 6 April 2016) 70-35-33
- (Bulgaria) Plamen Lipenski (7 April 2016 – 31 May 2016)
- (Bulgaria) Aleksandar Dimitrov (1 June 2016 – 17 October 2016) 5-2-6
- (Bulgaria) Plamen Lipenski (20 October 2016 – 26 October 2016)
- (Bulgaria) Ferario Spasov (26 October 2016 – 19 May 2017) 11-6-8
- (Bulgaria) Aleksandar Tomash (June 2017 - October 2019) 41-21-28
- (Bulgaria) Dimitar Dimitrov (October 2019 - April 2021) 21-7-18
- (Bulgaria) Petar Kolev (April 2021 - January 2022) 9-7-11
- (Bulgaria) Petar Hubchev (January 2022 - September 2022) 7-5-12
- (Bulgaria) Nikolay Kirov (September 2022 - June 2023) 6-6-15
- (Argentina) Gustavo Aragolaza (June 2023 – September 2023) match record: 4-1-4
- (Spain) José Acciari (September 2023 - October 2024) match record: 13-6-17
- (Spain) Josu Uribe (October 2024 - May 2025) match record: 11-5-10
- (Bulgaria) Plamen Lipenski (May 2025 – July 2025)
- (Spain) Víctor Basadre (10 July 2025 - September 2025) match record: 1-2-2
- (Argentina) Alejandro Sageras (September 2025 - November 2025)
- (Spain) Josu Uribe (27 November 2025 - May 2026)
- (Bulgaria) Vladimir Manchev (23 June 2026 - 30 August 2026)
- (Bulgaria) Ahmed Hikmet (3 September 2026 - present)

== Club staff ==
As of 23 June 2026

Name	Position
Coaching staff
(Bulgaria) Ahmed Hikmet	Head coach
(Bulgaria) Plamen Lipenski	Assistant coach
(Bulgaria) Mihail Rolev	Goalkeeping coach
Upper management
(Argentina) Hernan Banato	Owner
(Bulgaria) Atanas Dafinov	Executive director
(Spain) Francisco Zaragoza	Sports director
