= Chernomorets (disambiguation) =

Chernomorets is a seaside town in Bulgaria.

Chernomorets may also refer to:

== Sports teams ==
- FC Chernomorets Novorossiysk, a Russian football club
- PSFC Chernomorets Burgas, a Bulgarian football club
- FC Chernomorets Burgas, a Bulgarian football club
- PFC Chernomorets Balchik, a Bulgarian football club
- FC Chernomorets Byala, a Bulgarian football club
- PFC Chernomorets Burgas Sofia, a Bulgarian football club
- BC Chernomorets, a Bulgarian basketball club

== Sports venues ==
- Chernomorets Stadium, a multi-purpose stadium in Burgas, Bulgaria
- Chernomorets Arena, a planned future modern sports venue in Burgas, Bulgaria
- Chernomorets Stadium, Byala, a multi-use stadium in Byala, Varna Province, Bulgaria

== See also ==
- Chornomorets (disambiguation), Ukrainian equivalent
