= Kiril Pandov =

Kiril Pandov can refer to:

- Kiril Pandov (boxer) (born 1943), Bulgarian Olympic boxer
- Kiril Pandov (footballer) (1928-2014), Bulgarian footballer
- Kiril Pandov (speed skater) (born 1983), Bulgarian Olympic speed skater
