= Krasimir Zafirov =

Bulgarian footballer and coach

Personal information
- Date of birth: 20 May 1950 (age 76)
- Place of birth: Byala, Bulgaria
- Position: Goalkeeper

Senior career*
Years	Team	Apps	(Gls)
1969–1971	Velbazhd Kyustendil	45	(0)
1971–1972	Cherno More	1	(0)
1972–1984	Spartak Varna	363	(0)
1984–1985	Shumen	33	(0)
1985–1988	Spartak Varna	39	(0)
Total		481	(0)

International career
1978–1982	Bulgaria	3	(0)

Managerial career
- 1994: Spartak Varna
- 2002–2015: Chernomorets Byala
- * Club domestic league appearances and goals

Krasimir Zafirov (Bulgarian: Красимир Зафиров; born 20 May 1950 in Byala) is a retired Bulgarian football player and now coach of FC Chernomorets Byala.

== Career ==
Zafirov was a goalkeeper. He played with Spartak Varna and earned 461 caps. For the Bulgaria national football team Zafirov featured in 3 games.

== Awards ==
- The best goalkeeper in Bulgaria: 1984, 1986
