= Atanas Atanasov (footballer, born 1969) =

Bulgarian footballer and coach

Atanas Atanasov - Orela
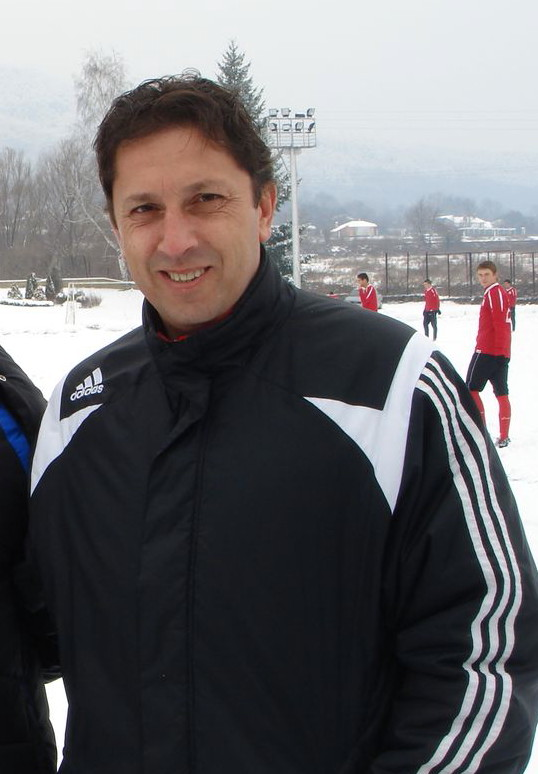

Personal information
- Full name: Atanas Vasilev Atanasov
- Date of birth: 16 March 1969 (age 57)
- Place of birth: Varna, Bulgaria
- Position: Defender

Team information
- Current team: Montana

Youth career
- 1977–1988: Spartak Varna

Senior career*
| Years | Team | Apps | (Gls) |
| 1990–1994 | Spartak Varna | 107 | (16) |
| 1994–1996 | Montana | | |
| 1996–1997 | Shumen | | |

Managerial career
- 2000–2002: Spartak Pleven (assistant)
- 2007–2008: Spartak Varna
- 2008: Kaliakra Kavarna
- 2009: Spartak Varna
- 2009: Lokomotiv Mezdra
- 2009–2010: Bulgaria U19
- 2010–2011: Chavdar Etropole
- 2012: Montana
- 2013: Neftochimic
- 2014: Spartak Varna
- 2015: Neftochimic
- 2016–2017: Spartak Varna
- 2017: Montana
- 2019: Montana
- 2020–2021: Montana
- 2021–2022: Dobrudzha
- 2024–2026: Dobrudzha
- 2026–: Montana
- * Club domestic league appearances and goals

Atanas Atanasov - Orela ("The Eagle") (Bulgarian: Атанас Атанасов - Орела; born 16 March 1969) is a former Bulgarian footballer and currently manager in charge of Montana, his fifth spell as head coach of the club.

On 20 April 2017 he was announced as manager of Montana. He couldn't save the team from relegation as Montana was eliminated in the final relegation play-off by Septemvri Sofia. He left the club in June 2017, after his contract expired.

== Managerial statistics ==
As of 29 December 2015

| Team | From | To | Record | | | | | | | |
| Team | From | To | G | W | D | L | Win % | GF | GA | GD |
|---|---|---|---|---|---|---|---|---|---|---|
| Chavdar Etropole | 1 August 2010 | 31 July 2011 | 32 | 14 | 5 | 13 | 43.75 | 41 | 35 | +6 |
| Montana | 7 December 2011 | 25 May 2013 | 39 | 9 | 5 | 25 | 23.08 | 40 | 72 | -32 |
| Neftochimic 1986 Burgas | 13 October 2013 | 1 January 2014 | 9 | 1 | 1 | 7 | 11.11 | 6 | 21 | -15 |
| Spartak 1918 | 1 January 2014 | 19 October 2014 | 27 | 8 | 2 | 17 | 29.63 | 24 | 50 | −26 |
| Neftochimic 1962 Burgas | 10 August 2015 | 29 September 2015 | 7 | 1 | 3 | 3 | 14.29 | 10 | 13 | -3 |
| Total | | | 114 | 33 | 16 | 65 | 28.95 | 121 | 191 | -70 |
