= FC Dobrudzha Dobrich =

Bulgarian football club

Dobrudzha
- Full name: Football Club Dobrudzha Dobrich
- Founded: 1919; 107 years ago
- Ground: Stadion Druzhba, Dobrich
- Capacity: 12,000
- Chairman: Vacant
- Head coach: Diyan Bozhilov
- League: Second League
- 2025–26: First League, 15th of 16 (relegated)
- Website: pfcdobrudzha.com
Home colours	Away colours

FC Dobrudzha (Bulgarian: ФК Добруджа) is a Bulgarian professional football club based in Dobrich, that competes in Second League, the second tier of Bulgarian football.

It plays its home matches at Stadion Druzhba with a capacity of 12,500 seats, and its team colours are green and yellow. The team is named after the Dobruja region, a prominent agricultural area in Northeast Bulgaria.

== Honours ==
- Bulgarian Cup
  - Semi-finalists: 1946, 1947, 1979–80
- First League
  - Best place: 7th place 1995–96
- Second League
  - Winners (2): 1965–66, 2024–25
- Third League
  - Winners (4): 2007/08, 2012/13, 2017/18, 2019/20

== History ==
Previous crest used until 2018.

Dobrudzha was founded as a union of three clubs, Vihar, Orlov and Slavia, in 1916. The club assumed the names Cherveno zname, Spartak and Septemvri between 1949 and 1957, when it was renamed Dobrudzha after a few other local sport associations joined.

In 1962, Dobrudzha managed to gain promotion to the A Group for the first time in the club's history. The maiden season in the top level proved to be a challenge, however, and Dobrudzha was relegated, finishing 15th. Back into the B Group, Dobrudzha barely missed on promotion back to the A Group in 1964, finishing second. In 1966, however, Dobrudzha won the B Group and promoted back to A Group, after three years away. Two consecutive 12th-place finishes during the 1966–67 and 1967-68 seasons in the elite followed, where Dobrudzha narrowly avoided relegation twice. The fairytale ended in 1968–69, however, as Dobrudzha finished 15th and was relegated, ending a three-year stay in the A Group.

After the relegation in 1969, Dobrudzha spend the next two decades in the B Group, with a second-place finish in 1975 being the closest the team could get in terms of returning to the A Group. After 22 years in the B Group, Dobrudzha finished second during the 1990–91 season, and the long-awaited return to the top tier finally ended. Season 1991–92 marked what would be the golden era for Dobrudzha. After narrowly avoiding relegation and finishing 14th that season, Dobrudzha managed to stabilize in the top level and gradually improved its ranking the following years, with a 13th-place finish in 1993, followed by two 12th-place finishes the following years. Season 1995–96 is considered the most successful for the club in its entire history, as that is when a 7th-place finish was achieved. The next three seasons produced mid-table results, and in 2000, Dobrudzha was relegated back to the B Group, ending the club's nine consecutive years in the elite.

Dobrudzha managed to finish fifth the following season in the B Group, which was followed by a second-place finish in the 2001–02 season, marking a return to the A Group after two years. However, the team was relegated back after only one season. Season 2002–03 remains the last appearance for Dobrudzha in the top tier, as of 2023.

In 2018, Dobrudzha returned to the second tier by winning the 2017–18 Northeast Third League. The team, however, struggled in the second tier, finishing last. In the 2019–20 season, Dobrudzha once more finished first in the third tier, being promoted again to the second tier after the season was finished early in March, due to the COVID-19 epidemic in Bulgaria.

Dobrudzha had an impressive 2024–25 season in the Second League, almost consistently staying in the top two places throughout the season. On May 11, 2025, Dobrudzha mathematically secured a top two spot, meaning promotion to the First League. This ended the team’s twenty-two year absence from top-tier football.

== Players ==
=== First-team squad ===
As of 11 November 2026

Note: Flags indicate national team as defined under FIFA eligibility rules; some limited exceptions apply. Players may hold more than one non-FIFA nationality.

No.	Pos.	Nation	Player
1	GK	BUL	Dimitar Iliev
3	DF	BUL	Miroslav Pushkarov
4	DF	BUL	Kaloyan Stiliyanov
6	DF	BUL	Ivan Aleksiev
7	FW	BUL	Petar Prindzhev (on loan from Spartak Varna)
8	MF	BUL	Nikola Vladev
9	FW	BUL	Daniel Halachev (on loan from Spartak Varna)
10	MF	FRA	Aymen Souda
11	DF	BUL	Viktor Mitev
12	GK	BUL	Denislav Stoychev
13	GK	BUL	Marek Chuba
14	MF	CRO	Niko Rak
17	FW	BUL	Kristiyan Yovov (on loan from Spartak Varna)

No.	Pos.	Nation	Player
20	FW	BUL	Martin Petkov
21	MF	BUL	Hristodar Hristov
22	DF	ROU	Iulian Carabela
23	MF	SEN	Malick Fall
27	DF	BUL	Borislav Vakadinov
28	DF	BUL	Teodor Slavov
31	FW	BUL	Andrian Dimitrov
44	MF	BLR	Vladimir Medved
45	DF	BUL	Kristiyan Beshev
70	DF	BUL	Dimitar Gospodinov
77	MF	BUL	Petar Vutsov
99	FW	BUL	Konstantin Patroklov

For recent transfers, see Transfers winter 2025–26 and Transfers summer 2026.

=== Foreign players ===
Up to twenty foreign nationals can be registered and given a squad number for the first team in the Bulgarian First League, however only five non-EU nationals can be used during a match day. Those non-EU nationals with European ancestry can claim citizenship from the nation their ancestors came from. If a player does not have European ancestry he can claim Bulgarian citizenship after playing in Bulgaria for 5 years.

EU Nationals

- (Croatia) Niko Rak
- (Romania) Iulian Carabela

EU Nationals (Dual citizenship)

- (France) (Algeria) Aymen Souda

Non-EU Nationals

- (Belarus) Vladimir Medved
- (Senegal) Malick Fall

== Notable players ==
- For all players with a Wikipedia article see Category:FC Dobrudzha Dobrich players.

Had international caps for their respective countries, held any club record, or had more than 100 league appearances. Players whose name is listed in bold represented their countries.

Bulgaria

- (Bulgaria) **Sasho Angelov**
- (Bulgaria) Diyan Bozhilov
- (Bulgaria) **Simeon Chilibonov**
- (Bulgaria) **Ivaylo Dimitrov**
- (Bulgaria) **Iliya Dyakov**
- (Bulgaria) **Ivo Georgiev**
- (Bulgaria) Daniel Gramatikov
- (Bulgaria) **Rumen Hristov**
- (Bulgaria) **Atanas Iliev**
- (Bulgaria) Georgi Kichukov
- (Bulgaria) Nikolay Kostov
- (Bulgaria) Ivaylo Lazarov
- (Bulgaria) **Kristiyan Malinov**
- (Bulgaria) **Georgi Pashov**
- (Bulgaria) **Milen Petkov**
- (Bulgaria) **Milen Gamakov**
- (Bulgaria) **Svetoslav Petrov**
- (Bulgaria) **Dimitar Pirgov**
- (Bulgaria) Simeon Simeonov
- (Bulgaria) Svilen Simeonov
- (Bulgaria) **Stoycho Stoilov**
- (Bulgaria) Stanislav Stoyanov
- (Bulgaria) **Nikolay Todorov**
- (Bulgaria) **Svetoslav Todorov**
- (Bulgaria) **Iliya Valov**
- (Bulgaria) **Mihail Venkov**
- (Bulgaria) **Preslav Yordanov**
- (Bulgaria) **Ventsislav Kerchev**
- (Bulgaria) **Georgi Argilashki**
- (Bulgaria) **Aykut Ramadan**
- (Bulgaria) **Ivaylo Mihaylov**
- (Bulgaria) **Kolyo Stanev**
- (Bulgaria) **Plamen Pepelyashev**
- (Bulgaria) Ventsislav Zhelev

Europe

- (Malta) **Justin Haber**
- (North Macedonia) **Risto Milosavov**
- (Portugal) **Tomás Silva**
- (Portugal) **Vasco Oliveira**
- (Portugal) **Boubacar Hanne**

Africa

- (Cape Verde) **Paulo Soares**
- (Tunisia) **Montassar Triki**
- (Guinea-Bissau) **Valdu Té**
- (Ivory Coast) **Serge Yoffou**

South America

- (Brazil) **Tom**
- (Brazil) **Lucas Cardoso**
- (Brazil) **Matheus Leoni**

== Statistics ==
=== Seasons ===
15 seasons in First League:

Season	Place
1962–63	15th
1966–67	12th
1967–68	12th
1968–69	15th
1991–92	14th
1992–93	13th
1993–94	12th
1994–95	12th
1995–96	7th
1996–97	12th
1997–98	11th
1998–99	9th
1999–00	12th
2002–03	13th
2025–26	15th

Best wins:

Home team	Away team	Result	Competition	Season
PFC Dobrudja (Dobrich)	FC Haskovo (Haskovo)	10–0	Bulgarian Cup	2000–01
PFC Rakovski (Ruse)	PFC Dobrudja (Dobrich)	1–7	A PFG	1996–97
PFC Dobrudja (Dobrich)	PFC Beroe (Stara Zagora)	5–1	A PFG	1994–95
PFC Dobrudja (Dobrich)	PFC Septemvri (Sofia)	5–1	A PFG	1998–99

== Notable persons ==
Players Players with most matches played for the team in A PFG:

Nationality	Player	Number of matches
(Bulgaria)	Rumen Boev	over 250
(Bulgaria)	Diyan Bozhilov	240
(Bulgaria)	Rumen Slavov	over 180
(Bulgaria)	Svetoslav Krastev	over 160
(Bulgaria)	Atanas Georgiev	over 140

Players with most goals, scored in A PFG:

Nationality	Player	Goals
(Bulgaria)	Diyan Bozhilov	42
(Bulgaria)	Georgi Manolov	23
(Bulgaria)	Rumen Boev	18
(Ivory Coast)	Serge Yoffou	15
(North Macedonia)	Risto Milosavov	14

== Former managers ==
- (Bulgaria) Iliya Iliev
- (Bulgaria) Petar Kirov
- (Bulgaria) Eduard Eranosyan
- (Bulgaria) Asen Milushev
- (Bulgaria) Petar Zhekov
- (Bulgaria) Hristo Milanov
- (Bulgaria) Kolyo Markov
- (Bulgaria) Yanko Dinkov
- (Bulgaria) Dimitar Aleksiev
- (Bulgaria) Vasil Velikov
- (Bulgaria) Ivan Manolov
- (Bulgaria) Boris Nikolov
- (Bulgaria) Stoyan Kotsev
- (Serbia) Ljubomir Veljković
- (Bulgaria) Svetoslav Todorov
- (Bulgaria) Dimcho Nenov
- (Bulgaria) Emil Velev
- (Bulgaria) Svetoslav Petrov
- (Bulgaria) Atanas Atanasov-Orela
- (Bulgaria) Sasho Angelov
- (Bulgaria) Stefan Slavov
- (Bulgaria) Diyan Bozhilov
- (Bulgaria) Radomir Todorov
- (Bulgaria) Todor Kiselichkov
- (Bulgaria) Atanas Atanasov-Orela
- (Bulgaria) Yasen Petrov
- (Bulgaria) Diyan Bozhilov
