= Kristiyan Yovov =

Bulgarian footballer (born 2006)

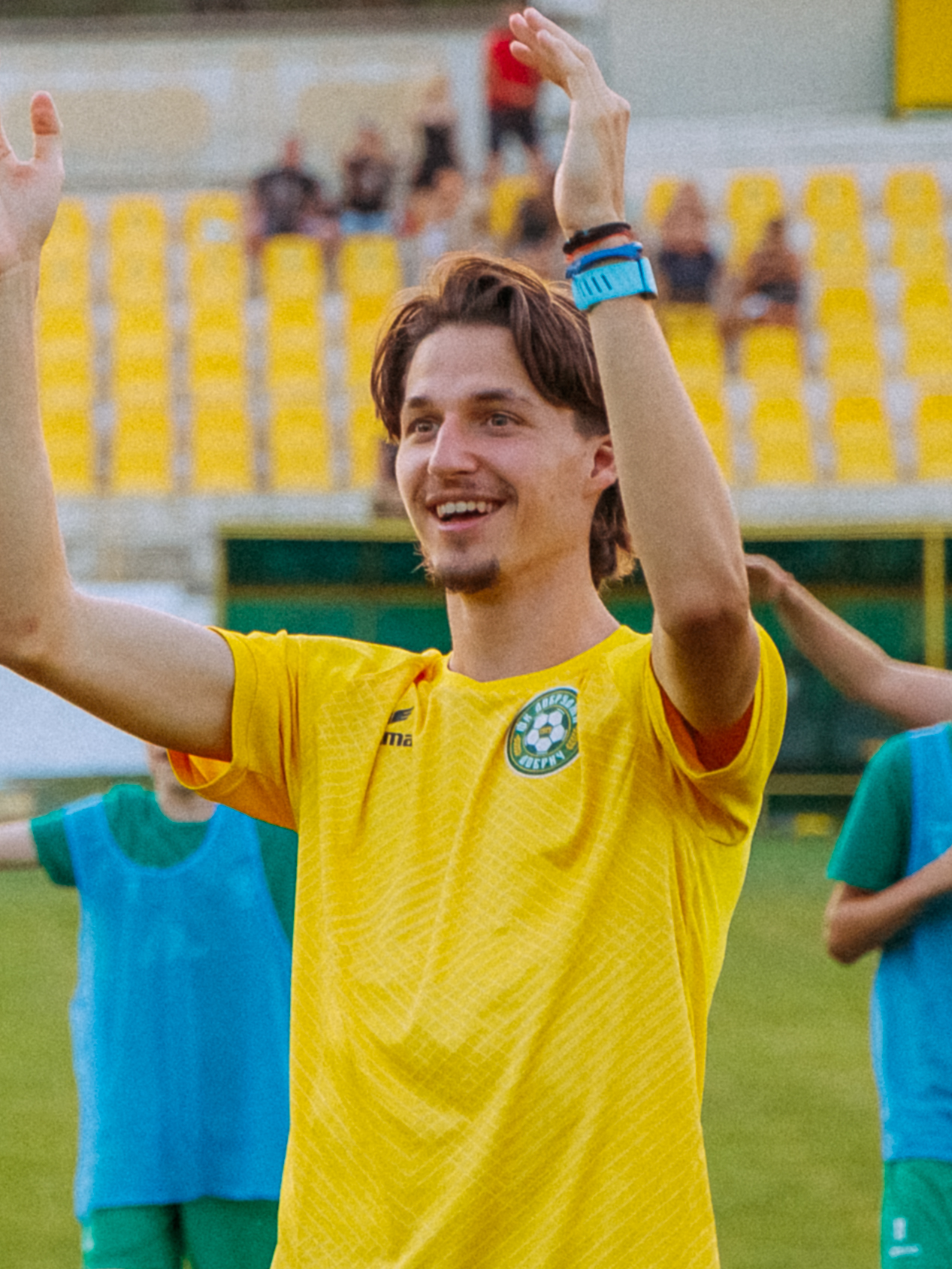
- Yovov in 2026

Personal information
- Full name: Kristiyan Hristov Yovov
- Date of birth: 13 February 2006 (age 20)
- Place of birth: Sofia, Bulgaria
- Height: 1.75 m (5 ft 9 in)
- Position: Attacking midfielder

Team information
- Current team: Dobrudzha (on loan from Spartak Varna)
- Number: 17

Youth career
- Levski Sofia

Senior career*
Years	Team	Apps	(Gls)
2022–2025	Levski Sofia II	62	(8)
2022–2026	Levski Sofia	3	(0)
2025	→ Botev Vratsa (loan)	1	(0)
2026	→ Sportist Svoge (loan)	10	(0)
2026–	Spartak Varna	0	(0)
2026–	→ Dobrudzha (loan)	13	(1)
- * Club domestic league appearances and goals as of 22 September 2026 (UTC)

Kristiyan Yovov (Bulgarian: Кристиян Йовов; born 13 February 2006) is a Bulgarian professional footballer who plays as an attacking midfielder for Second League club Dobrudzha Dobrich on loan from Spartak Varna.

He is the son of Hristo Yovov.

== Career ==
Yovov signed his professional contract with Levski on 14 February 2024. On 21 January 2025 he was send on loan to Botev Vratsa. On 24 February 2026 he was send on loan again, but this time at Sportist Svoge.

On 30 June 2026 he left Levski and moved to Spartak Varna on a long term deal. Day later, he was send on loan until end of the season in Second League club Dobrudzha Dobrich alongside Daniel Halachev and Petar Prindzhev. He scored a goal in his debut match for the 5:1 league win over Pirin Blagoevgrad.
