= Diyan Bozhilov =

Bulgarian footballer (born 1971)

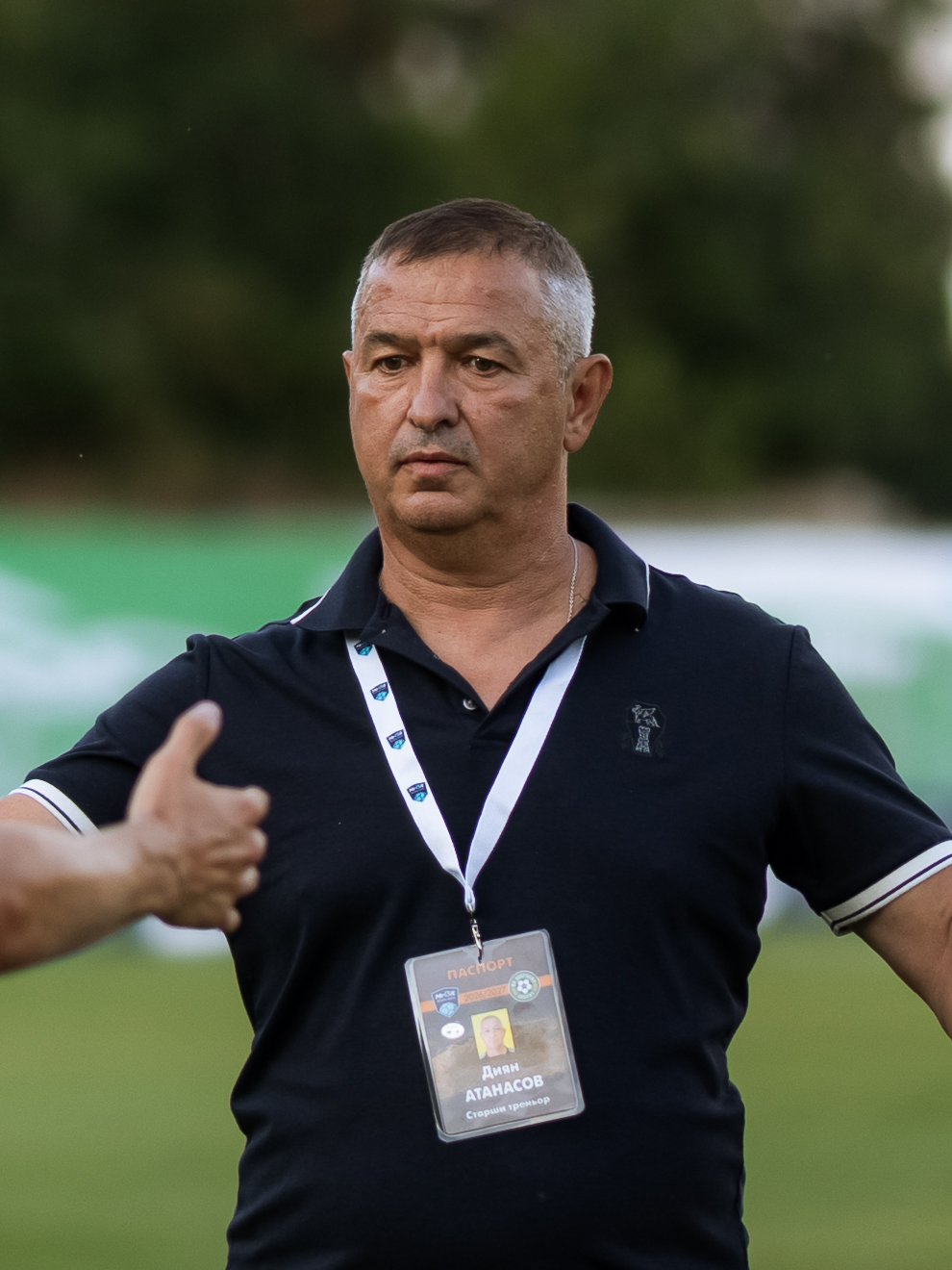

Personal information
- Date of birth: 15 May 1971 (age 55)
- Place of birth: Dobrich, Bulgaria
- Position: Midfielder

Team information
- Current team: Dobrudzha Dobrich (manager)

Senior career*
Years	Team	Apps	(Gls)
1990–1996	Dobrudzha Dobrich	171	(21)
1996–1997	Slavia Sofia	26	(3)
1997–1999	Dobrudzha Dobrich	55	(18)
1999–2000	Botev Plovdiv	24	(4)
2000	Dobrudzha Dobrich	14	(3)
2001–2003	Beroe Stara Zagora	56	(9)
2003–2004	AEL	27	(4)
2004–2005	Beroe Stara Zagora	30	(7)
2005–2006	Diagoras	26	(5)
2006–2007	Kaliakra Kavarna	19	(1)
Total		332	(45)

Managerial career
- 2010–2011: Dobrudzha Dobrich
- 2011: Chavdar Byala Slatina
- 2012–2013: Dunav Ruse
- 2016–2017: Beroe (assistant)
- 2017–2018: Dobrudzha Dobrich
- 2019: Spartak Varna
- 2019–2020: Botev Plovdiv (assistant)
- 2023: Dobrudzha Dobrich
- 2026–: Dobrudzha Dobrich
- * Club domestic league appearances and goals

Diyan Bozhilov (Bulgarian: Диян Божилов; born 15 May 1971) is a former Bulgarian footballer and currently a manager of Dobrudzha Dobrich.

Bozhilov played as a midfielder and spent most of his professional career in the Bulgarian First League playing for Dobrudzha Dobrich, Slavia Sofia, Botev Plovdiv, and Beroe Stara Zagora.

Bozhilov spent a couple of years in Greece playing for Chania, Larissa, Achaiki and Diagoras. He finished his career in 2007 after a brief spell in “B” PFG with Kaliakra Kavarna.

Diyan Bozhilov is Dobrudzha’s all-time leading goalscorer in “A” PFG with 35 goals.
