= Chernomorets Stadium, Byala =

Multi-use stadium in Byala, Bulgaria

Chernomorets Stadium
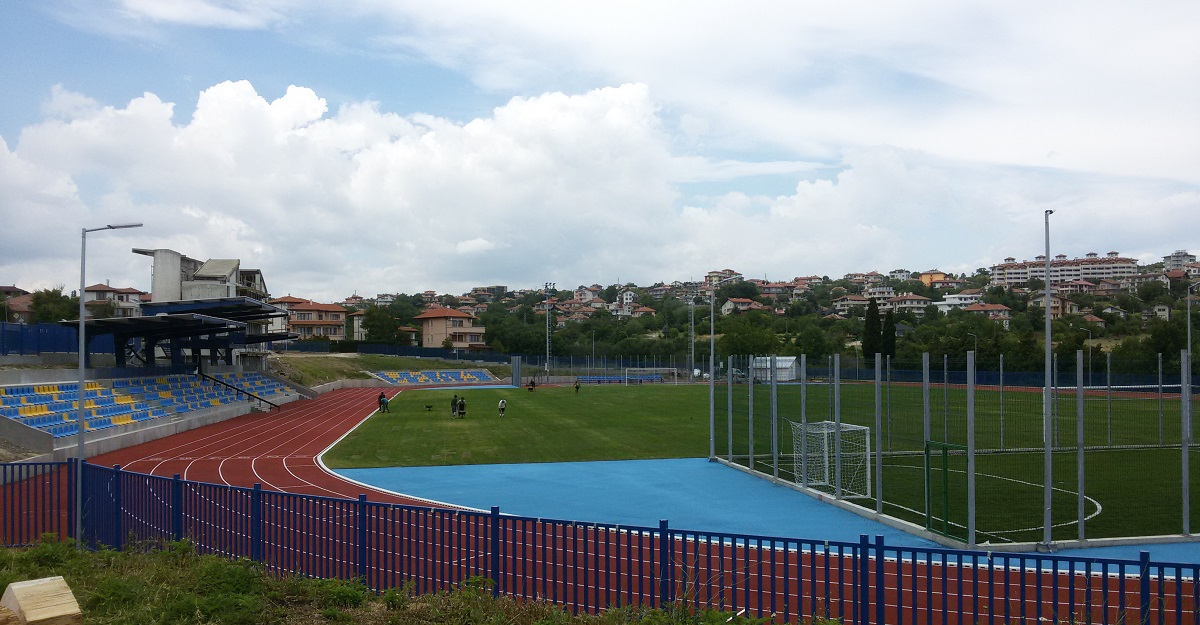
- Interactive map of Chernomorets Stadium
- Location: Byala, Varna Province, Bulgaria
- Owner: Byala Municipality
- Capacity: 700 (2015–present); 1,050 (1986–2014)
- Surface: Natural grass
- Field size: 105 m × 72 m (344 ft × 236 ft)

Construction
- Groundbreaking: 1986; 40 years ago
- Renovated: 2015; 11 years ago
- Cost: €1.25 million (2015)

Tenant
- FC Chernomorets Byala (1986–present)

Chernomorets Stadium is a multi-use stadium in Byala, Varna Province, Bulgaria. It is used mostly for football matches and is the home field of FC Chernomorets Byala. The stadium has seating capacity for 700 people.
