= FC Chernomorets Byala =

Bulgarian football club

Chernomorets
- Full name: Football Club Chernomorets Byala
- Nickname: The white rocks
- Founded: 1945; 80 years ago
- Ground: Chernomorets Stadium, Byala
- Capacity: 700
- Chairman: Krasimir Zafirov
- Manager: Krasimir Zafirov
- League: North-East V AFG
- 2013–14: North-East V AFG, 8th
Home colours	Away colours

FC Chernomorets (Bulgarian: ФК Черноморец) is a Bulgarian football club based in Byala, Varna Province, currently playing in the Bulgarian V AFG, the third division of Bulgarian football. Club colors are blue, white and yellow. The club was officially founded in 1945.

== Stadium ==
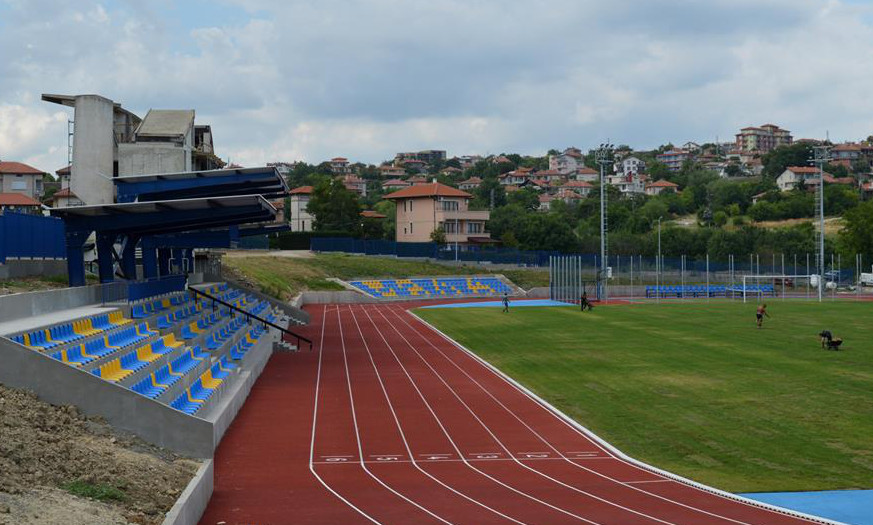
Chernomorets Stadium in Byala

Its home stadium Chernomorets has a capacity of 700 seats. Built in 1986, the ground underwent a reconstruction in 2006.
