= Karadere beach =

Beach in Bulgaria

Coordinates: 42°55′1.2″N 27°53′45.6″E

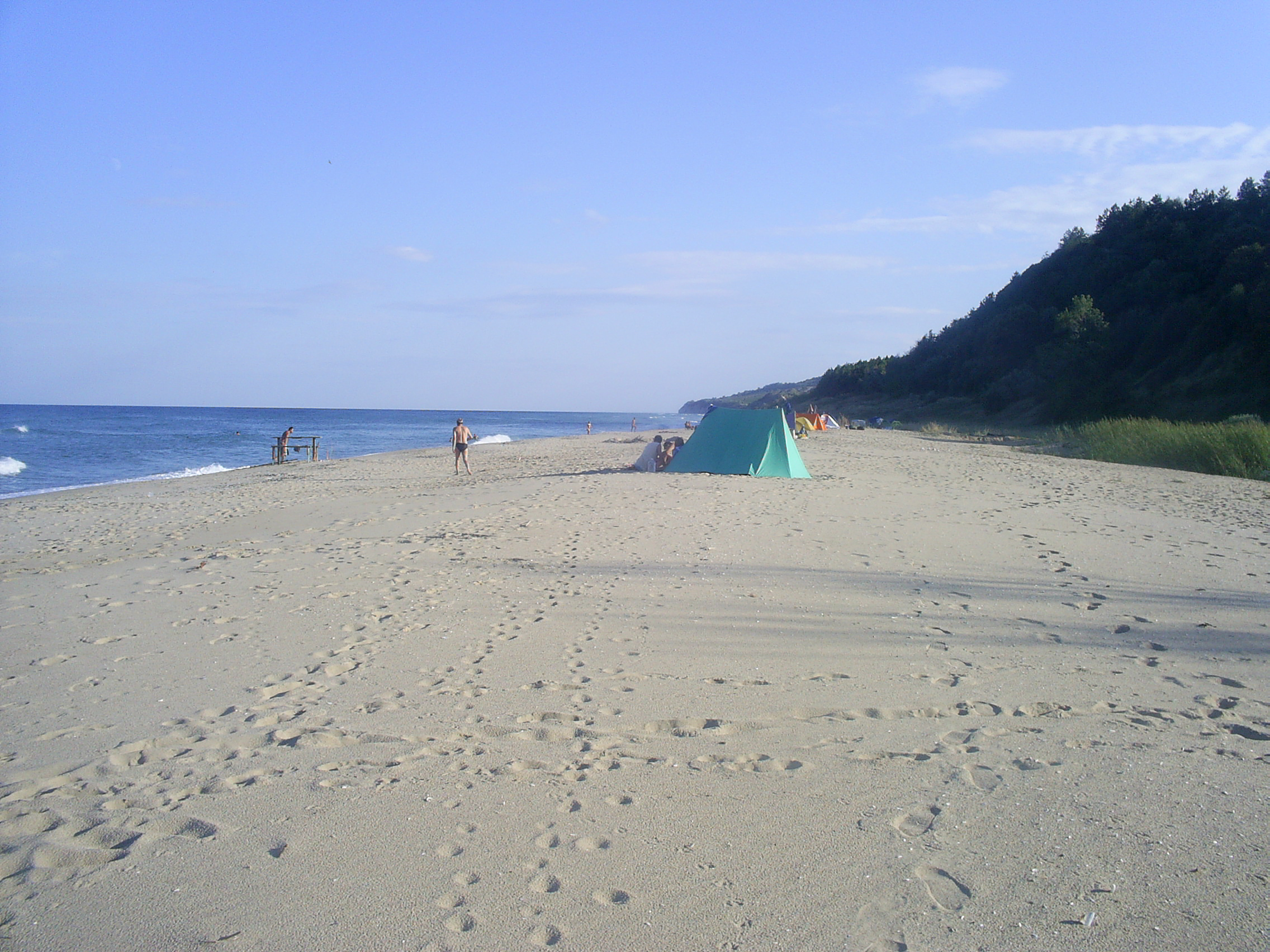
Karadere beach

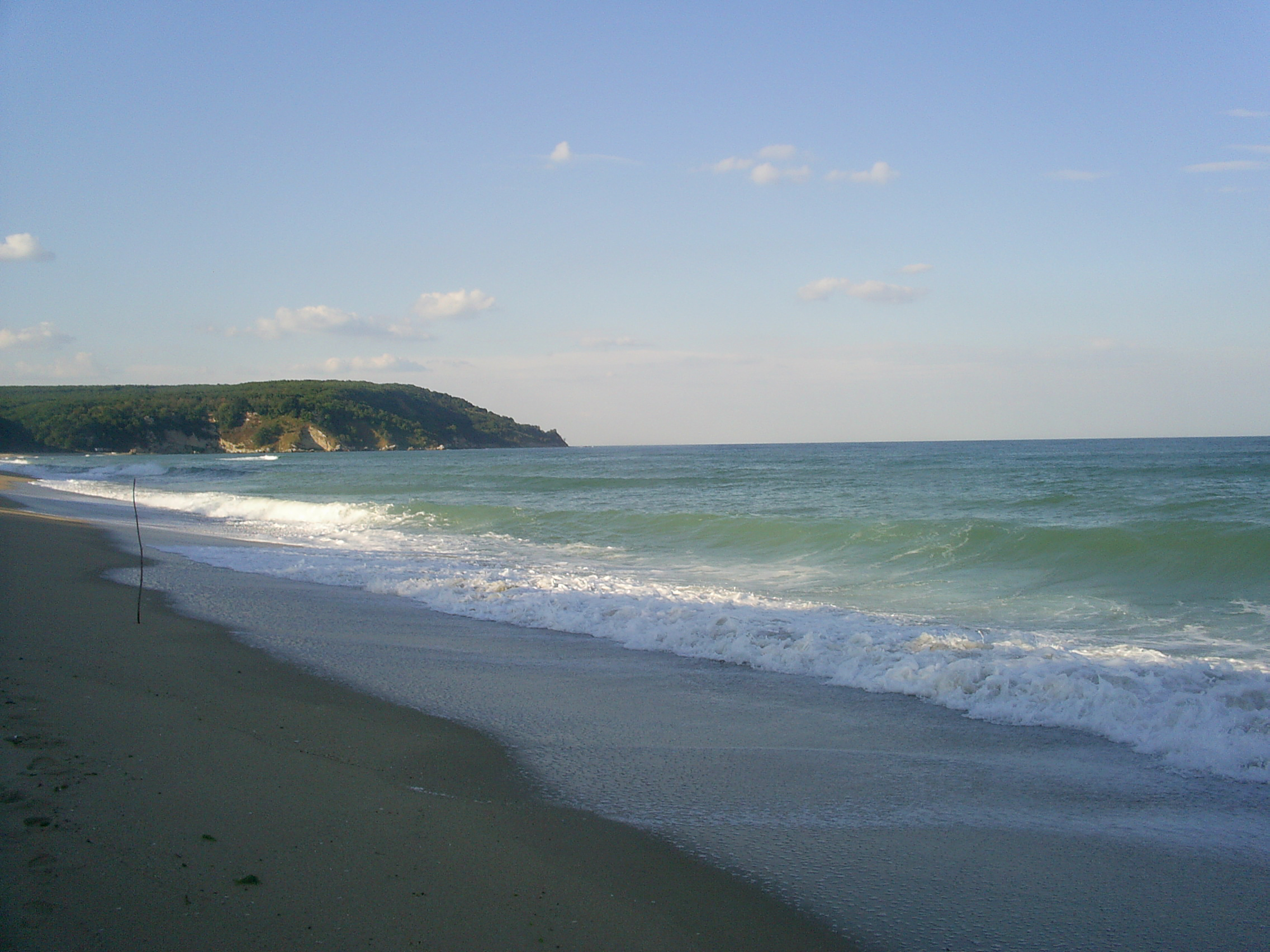
Karadere beach

Karadere (Bulgarian: Кара дере) is one of the last remaining unblighted by mass tourism development areas with a wild beach on the Bulgarian Black Sea Coast. The name derives from the Turkish kara meaning black and dere meaning gully. Situated to the northern slopes of the Balkan Mountains, Karadere is about 5 kilometers away from the town of Byala and the village of Goritsa, Varna Province. The beach spans 5 kilometers in length and is bordered by a mixed oak forest, vineyards and cultivated land. The mouths of the Karadere river and the Byala river are situated on the beach. Although Karadere is relatively close to the town and village, it is difficult to reach because there is no infrastructure. Bumpy dirt roads and tracks lead to the beach where there is no cell phone service, electricity, tap water, sewage or any other urban facilities. Despite the lack of main utilities and facilities, Karadere has unique natural offerings—the fine sand, the clean sea water, the fresh air, the sunny weather, the spring water, the mud baths and even the opportunity to spot a dolphin in the bay.

It is one of very few places on the Bulgarian coast still permitting free camping. The free camping consists predominantly of tents, which are pitched on the sand or in the forest above shore. There are also caravans, but they are confined to the northernmost part due to the difficulty to transport them to the southern side of the beach. A diverse group of people camp on and visit Karadere. Families with children, extreme water sportsmen, nature lovers, artists, people with different occupation and any adventurers from different parts of Bulgaria and abroad prefer Karadere to the numerous overcrowded mass tourism resorts along Bulgaria's coastline. Additionally, the wild beach is suited for topless and nude sunbathing. The beach is popular with Bulgarians, who gather in mass there to see the sunrise on 1 July.

Karadere is part of the EU's eco network Natura 2000 network, in the protected area Kamchiyska Planina, for the conservation of bird species and protected area Shkorpilovtsi Beach for the conservation of the conservation of natural habitats, wild flora and fauna.
