= Chornomorets =

Chornomorets is a Ukrainian toponymical term with reference to Black Sea (Ukrainian: Чорне море, romanized: Chorne more).

Chornomorets may also refer to:

- FC Chornomorets Odesa, a football club from Odesa
  - FC Chornomorets-2 Odesa, a former reserve team of FC Chornomorets Odesa
  - Chornomorets Stadium
- Chornomorets, a former Zaporizhian Cossack, member of the Black Sea Host
- Oleksandr Chornomorets (born 1993), Ukrainian footballer

== See also ==
- Chernomorets (disambiguation), Bulgarian and Russian equivalent
