= FC Spartak Varna =

Spartak Varna
- Full name: Футболен клуб „Спартак“ Варна; Football Club Spartak Varna
- Nickname: Соколите (The Falcons)
- Founded: 28 August 1918; 108 years ago as SC Balgarski Sokol
- Ground: Stadion Spartak
- Capacity: 7,000
- Chairman: Vacant
- Manager: Daniel Morales
- League: First League
- 2025–26: First League, 12th of 16
- Website: spartakvarna.bg
Home colours	Away colours	Third colours

FC Spartak Varna (Bulgarian: Футболен клуб „Спартак“ Варна) is a Bulgarian association football club based in Varna, which currently competes in the First League, the top level of Bulgarian football league system. Spartak plays its home matches at the local Stadion Spartak.

Founded in 1918, Spartak Varna established itself as one of the early pioneering clubs in Bulgarian football. Spartak won the Bulgarian league in 1932, and was runner up in 1931 and 1933. Spartak has spent the majority of its existence in the first tier of Bulgarian football, with the club’s most recent top flight participation being season 2022–2023.

Spartak's nickname is the "Falcons", and the club has a rivalry with fellow Varna-based club, Cherno More Varna. Matches between the two sides are known as The Derby of Varna. The two sides even used to share the Yuri Gagarin Stadium before it was demolished.

== History ==
=== 1918–1945: Foundation of SC Sokol ===
Spartak Varna was founded on 28 August 1918 by a group of young people, who were playing football together for two years. At the initial meeting, regarding the establishment of the club, the name was decided to be SC Sokol. Niagol Kolev was elected as the first chairman of the club. A few days later, the members of the board registered the Football Club to the government under the name "Bulgarski Sokol". The colors of the team were blue and white. "Bulgarski Sokol," one of the poor suburban teams in Varna, was poorly circumstanced in comparison to the leading teams at that time such as Ticha and "Vladislav."

On 30 January 1924 "Bulgarski Sokol" merged with the sport club "Shipka" and proved to be one of the strongest teams in Varna. Among all the players called with a lot of praise from the fans "Falcons" with most successful plays was the forward Mihail Tunchev. In 1924 he was invited in the national team, and there he became the first national player of the team.

A few years later started the rise of the team. In the season 1928/29 the team won for the first time the championship of Varna, and joined the State Championship where they reached third place. Two years later 1930/31 the falcons were again champions of Varna. For the State Championship they reached the final with the Sofia's AS-23. Next year "Shipchenski Sokol" again reached the final, where the rival was the capitol's team Slavia. On 18.09.1932 in front of 10 000 audience on the football field of AS-23 the falcons won with 2:1 and became State Champion and Winner of the Cup of the King. In the next season "Shipchenski sokol" were again champion of Varna, and for the State Championship they reach for the third consecutive time the final. On 03.10.1933 in Sofia rival of the "falcons" was PFC Levski Sofia. Varna's team lost with 3:1 and took the second place in the State Championship.

=== 1945–2010: Merge and Spartak naming ===
In 1945 the club merged with other two Varna's football clubs "Levski" and "Radetski". This happened on 18 October 1945, and the team accepted a new name - Spartak Varna (the name Spartak means "Spartacus", a gladiator who led an uprising against Ancient Rome). In the years between 1945–1948, three times Spartak reached the semi-finals of the State Championship. In 1950, the team took the fifth place in the newly created "A" Republican Football League. Spartak Stalin relegated to B League in 1952 but returned to A League at next year. Spartak again relegated to second level in 1963–64 season but returned in 1964–65 season. However, this return was short-lived and relegated in 1965–66.

In 1955, Spartak won the third place and bronze medals in the championship of "A" League. In 1959, the forward of Spartak, Georgi Arnaudov-"Alaha", became a shooter of the championship with nine goals. Two years later, Spartak again had a winner in the shooters list: Liuben Kostov with 12 goals. In 1960/61, Spartak had matches in the tournament of the Soviet Army which then was playing the role of the Cup of Bulgaria. They reached the final and met the strongest team in Bulgaria at that time- CSKA. Spartak lost the final 3:0. As a finalist, however, Spartak won the right to play in the 1961–62 European Cup Winners' Cup. Spartak met Austrian club SK Rapid Wien in the first round. After a goalless draw in Wien, Spartak lost the second leg 5–2 at home and was eliminated. In 1969, another sport club merged with Spartak – it was the "Lokomotiv" sport club, a smaller club from Varna. The merge became a fact on 06.03.1969 and the club took the name "JSK-Spartak". JSK-Spartak returned to first level in 1971 but relegated in 1973–74 and returned to first level in 1974–75. JSK-Spartak relegated again in 1977–78.

In 1982 the "Falcons" reached the final of the Cup of Bulgaria as they won the semi-final against Levski-Spartak in Kazanlak in front of a crowd of 20,000. In Plovdiv, Spartak lost the final 4:0 to CSKA-Septemvriisko Zname, but as a finalist they obtained the right to play in the Cup of the National Cup Winners. In the first round, Spartak faced Turkish side Mersin Idman Yurdu. Spartak managed to win in Varna and draw in Mersin, enabling progression. In the next round, Spartak had the privilege to play former European champions Manchester United. Spartak displayed strong performances in both games, but narrowly lost 1-2 at the Yuri Gagarin Stadium and 0-1 at Old Trafford, thus suffering elimination. In the same year, JSK-Spartak returned to the A League. In the season 1983/84, after number of games, Spartak reached third place. The goalkeeper Krasimir Zafirov was declared the best goalkeeper in the championship. Since 1985 the football was separated from the other sports in JSK-Spartak, and that way the FC Spartak Varna is differentiated as well.

The 80's will be remembered and with the regular participation of the team in the tournaments for the Varna Summer Cup. Rivals of the "falcons" were the teams of NK Rijeka Croatia, the English Oxford United F.C., Hungarian Újpest FC and many others. In 1988/89, Spartak became the first Bulgarian team with private sponsor and president Atanas Atanasov-Kebie. From the autumn of 1994, president of the club was Nikolay Ishkov. Spartak relegated to B league in 1988–89 and returned to A League in 1991–92. However, Spartak relegated to second level in 1993–94.

In the season 1994/95 after many games the falcons won the cup in Bulgaria. In the same season the forward Ivo Georgiev scores 21 goals. For the first time there was successful transfer policy and perspective selection. Many of the players has a profitable offers from capitol's and foreign clubs. In its 84 years of history Spartak went through many peaks and downfall moments, but it left a trace in the Bulgarian football. The same season Spartak returned to the first level.

=== 2010–2015: Dark times ===
In May 2010, Spartak Varna was relegated to Bulgarian North East V group due to the inability to comply with requirements for a professional licence. As a result, under new ownership, the club was re-registered as Spartak 1918 after a formal merger with another football club from Varna - Vladislav (an amateur club founded an year earlier in 2009 but with a professional licence). A month later, fans of Spartak Varna (forming the majority of the ultras), not happy with the previous management and not seeing a change after the new registration, formed a new club taking over the license of FC Topolite. However, although reaching an agreement with FC Topolite, the club was not allowed to change the name of that club to Spartak. The fan-owned team finished second after Spartak 1918 in the first half of the 2010/2011 season, but due to financial problems, it stopped its participation. The group of fans who formed FC Topolite kept boycotting the current management of Spartak 1918 for the next few years, by not attending the team's games.

=== 2015–present: Restructure of Spartak 1918 and founding of a new FC Spartak Varna ===
==== 2015–2017: FC Spartak Varna and Spartak 1918 ====
A new team was founded on 17 May 2015 by founding board led by Spartak's legends Atanas Atanasov, Lyudmil Goranov, Dimitar Trendafilov, Ilko Stanchev and Trayan Dyankov, after the original club Spartak 1918, still alive despite the financial collapse and maintaining a youth team and an academy had bad leadership in the last years. Both teams existed in parallel; The new FC Spartak Varna team wanted to use Spartak Stadium in order to start from the 3rd league - the Bulgarian V AFG, but this hasn't happened since the stadium was given to Spartak 1918, which withdrew from V Group and only kept a youth formation and an academy that football season. Some of the players who joined the newly founded team played also for the local futsal club Grand Pro Varna.

On 11 October 2015 the new team signed a sponsorship with UltraGas, which would guarantee them enough money to prepare a new strong team in the future.

On 6 May 2016 FC Spartak Varna applied to gain rights to play and operate at Spartak Stadium because they can't play at Lokomotiv Stadium in V Group in 2016–17 season if they get promotion. Atanas Atanasov had a talk with the sports minister Krasen Kralev who promised to give these right to Spartak, if the stadium become municipal property, because Spartak 1918 was the current operator of the stadium, even after the condition of the stadium is critical. Atanasov also said, that the team is looking for sponsors and eventually a club owner. On 11 May 2016 the club gain the rights on Lokomotiv Stadium, which would give them the chance to start a complete youth academy from the 2016/17 season.

On 3 July 2016 Trayan Dyankov was appointed as the new manager of the team and would lead the team in Third Amateur League. On 1 August 2016 Dyankov died from a heart attack during training at Lokomotiv Stadium. Atanas Atanasov become the manager of the team for the beginning of the season.

On 26 November 2016 the manager of Spartak, Atanas Atanasov, announced that the new club will merge with the old Spartak 1918 to have one Spartak. In the meantime Spartak 1918, having pulled out a men's formation from the 2015/2016 season, joined in Varna Regional Group 'A' in 2016/2017 season.

On 1 February 2017 the official merger was announced, with Spartak 1918 manager Ivan Naydenov taking the team. The complete merger would be after the season 2016/2017 end.

==== 2017–Present: Merger of Spartak teams ====
On 25 June 2017 FC Spartak Varna and Spartak 1918 finally merged as Spartak 1918. Three days earlier the new logo of the team was announced. On 29 December 2017 Engibar Engibarov was announced as the new manager of the team. On 6 July 2018 the unified Spartak 1918 officially returned the rights over to Spartak Stadium.

On 12 May 2019 at the end of season 2018/19, Spartak secured their return to professional football, winning South-East Third division two rounds before its end and managing to be promoted to the Second League. However, Spartak endured a difficult season back into the second tier, finishing second to last, suffering an immediate relegation.

For the 2020-21 season, Spartak finally returned to their renovated home stadium. On 16 May 2021 the team secured their first place in their Third League group and won the promotion to Second League once again. The team ended up on top of the standings before the winter break. On 5 May 2022, after a 2–1 home win against Sozopol the team secured a top 3 place and their return to First League in the 2022–23 season, after 12 years of absence. The team missed the chance to win the last league match, and subsequently the league, ending in 3rd place, with the same number of points as Septemvri Sofia and Hebar Pazardzhik.

Spartak experienced a difficult return to the top level. The falcons largely remained within the relegation zone of the regular season and ultimately remained there for the remainder of the season, suffering immediate relegation back to Second League. Season 2023–24 marked a good run in the Bulgarian Cup for Spartak. The team managed to reach the quarterfinals, defeating top tier side Lokomotiv Sofia in the round of 16 after a penalty shootout.

== Honours ==
- First League
  - Winners (1): 1932
- Second League
  - Winners (8): 1953, 1964–65, 1970–71, 1974–75, 1981–82, 1994–95, 2005–06, 2023–24
- Third League
  - Winners (3): 2010–11, 2018–19, 2020–21
- A Regional Group
  - Winners (1): 2015–16

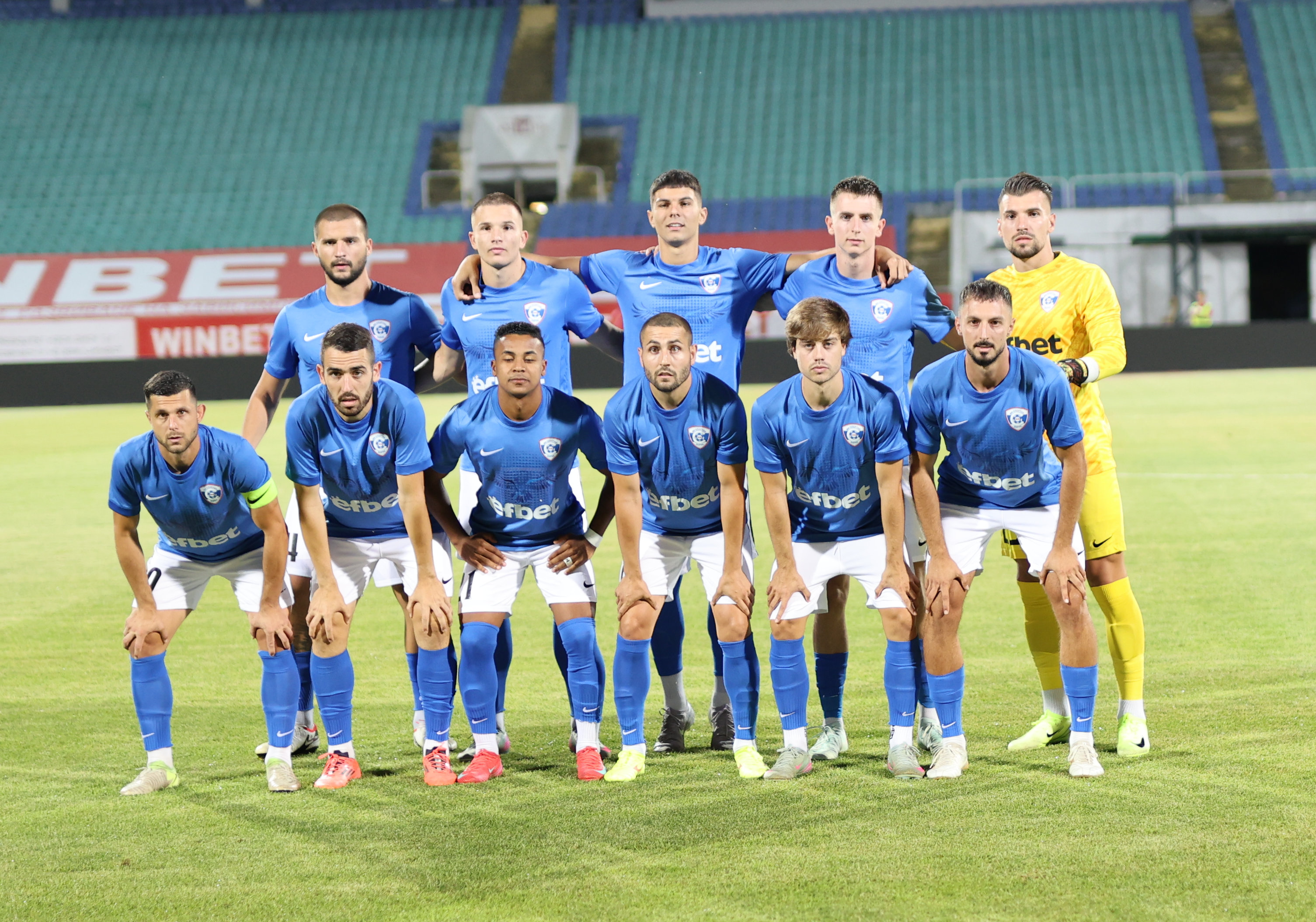
Squad, Season 2025/2026

== Crest, shirt and sponsors ==
Crest used from 2016 until 2018.

Spartak Varna adopted blue, white and red, the main colours of the original Spartak Varna. On 11 October 2015 the team signed a sponsorship with UltraGas. For the first match in 2018 Spartak signed a contract with the reseller store iPhonePlace.

After adopting a new crest in 2016, on 23 January 2018 Spartak managed to return the rights to their original crest.

Period	Kit manufacturer	Shirt partner
2015–2017	(Bulgaria) Krasiko	Ultra Gas
2017	(Bulgaria) Krasiko	None
2018–2019	(Germany) Uhlsport	iPhonePlace.bg
2019–2023	(Germany) Jako	Efbet, Intercom Group
2023–2025	(United States) Nike	Efbet, Intercom Group
2025–2026	(United States) Nike	Efbet
2026–	(Germany) Jako	Efbet

== European tournaments history ==
Season	Competition	Round	Club	Home	Away	Aggregate
1961–62	Cup Winners' Cup	Preliminary round	(Austria) Rapid Wien	2–5	0–0	2–5
1983–84	Cup Winners' Cup	First Round	(Turkey) Mersin İY	1–0	0–0	1–0
1983–84	Cup Winners' Cup	Second Round	(England) Manchester United	1–2	0–2	1–4
1996	Intertoto Cup	Group 8	(Poland) ŁKS Łódź	–	1–1	4th
1996	Intertoto Cup	Group 8	(Russia) KAMAZ Naberezhnye Chelny	–	2–2	4th
1996	Intertoto Cup	Group 8	(Germany) 1860 München	2–1	–	4th
1996	Intertoto Cup	Group 8	(Czech Republic) Kaučuk Opava	0–1	–	4th
1997	Intertoto Cup	Group 10	(France) Montpellier	1–1	–	5th
1997	Intertoto Cup	Group 10	(Netherlands) Groningen	0–2	–	5th
1997	Intertoto Cup	Group 10	(Romania) Gloria Bistrita	–	1–2	5th
1997	Intertoto Cup	Group 10	(Federal Republic of Yugoslavia) Čukarički	–	0–3	5th
1998	Intertoto Cup	First Round	(Russia) Baltika Kaliningrad	1–1	0–4	1–5
1999	Intertoto Cup	First Round	(Belgium) Sint-Truidense	1–2	0–6	1–8
2001	Intertoto Cup	First Round	(Poland) Dyskobolia Grodzisk	4–0	0–1	4–1
2001	Intertoto Cup	Second Round	(Ukraine) Tavriya Simferopol	0–3	2–2	2–5

== Players ==
=== Current squad ===
As of 11 November 2026

Note: Flags indicate national team as defined under FIFA eligibility rules; some limited exceptions apply. Players may hold more than one non-FIFA nationality.

No.	Pos.	Nation	Player
1	GK	BRA	Pedro Victor
3	DF	CRO	Mateo Jurić-Petrašilo
4	DF	BUL	Boris Ivanov
5	DF	BUL	Dimo Krastev
6	MF	POR	Ricardo Sousa
7	MF	BRA	Buá
10	MF	POR	Jota Lopes
11	FW	POR	Boubacar Hanne
16	MF	GBS	Edson Silva (on loan from Botev Plovdiv)
17	MF	BUL	Tsvetoslav Marinov
19	MF	HUN	Sámuel Major (on loan from MTK)
20	DF	BUL	Deyan Lozev (captain)

No.	Pos.	Nation	Player
23	GK	BUL	Plamen Iliev
29	DF	CIV	Zakaria Tindano (on loan from Göztepe)
45	DF	NED	Joey Tshitoku
70	FW	BUL	Ahmed Ahmedov
72	DF	POR	Vasco Oliveira
76	DF	ESP	David Valverde
77	MF	BUL	Anton Ivanov
80	FW	POR	Ángel Gomes
82	MF	POR	Tomás Silva
89	GK	BUL	Valentin Dimitrov
90	FW	NGR	Chidera Okoh (on loan from Botev Plovdiv)

For recent transfers, see List of Bulgarian football transfers summer 2026.

=== Out on loan ===
Note: Flags indicate national team as defined under FIFA eligibility rules; some limited exceptions apply. Players may hold more than one non-FIFA nationality.

No.	Pos.	Nation	Player
—	FW	BUL	Petar Prindzhev (at Dobrudzha until 30 June 2027)
—	FW	BUL	Daniel Halachev (at Dobrudzha until 30 June 2027)

No.	Pos.	Nation	Player
—	FW	BUL	Kristiyan Yovov (at Dobrudzha until 30 June 2027)
—	FW	BUL	Georgi Trifonov (at Fratria until 30 June 2027)

=== Foreign players ===
Up to five non-EU nationals can be registered and given a squad number for the first team in the Bulgarian First Professional League however only three can be used in a match day. Those non-EU nationals with European ancestry can claim citizenship from the nation their ancestors came from. If a player does not have European ancestry he can claim Bulgarian citizenship after playing in Bulgaria for 5 years.

EU Nationals

- (Croatia) Mateo Jurić-Petrašilo
- (Spain) David Valverde
- (Hungary) Sámuel Major
- (Portugal) Jota Lopes
- (Portugal) Ricardo Sousa
- (Portugal) Tomás Silva
- (Portugal) Vasco Oliveira

EU Nationals (Dual citizenship)

- (Brazil) (Portugal) Pedro Victor
- (Portugal) (Senegal) Boubacar Hanne
- (Venezuela) (Portugal) Ángel Gomes

Non-EU Nationals

- (Ivory Coast) (Burkina Faso) Zakaria Tindano

== Goalscoring and appearance records ==
As of 22 April 2022

**Most appearances for the club in First League**

Rank	Name	Career	Appearances
1	(Bulgaria) Iliya Kirchev	1951–1965	286
2	(Bulgaria) Nikolay Stanchev	1994–2006	247
3	(Bulgaria) Krasimir Zafirov	1972–1984; 1985–1988	227
4	(Bulgaria) Biser Dimitrov	1955–1964	224
5	(Bulgaria) Blagoy Yanev	1951–1964	216
6	(Bulgaria) Kiril Pandov	1948–1960	207
7	(Bulgaria) Hristo Valchanov	1954–1966	206
8	(Bulgaria) Stefan Naydenov	1982–1990; 1991–1993	193
9	(Bulgaria) Encho Nedev	1969–1983	190
10	(Bulgaria) Plamen Kazakov	1979–1981; 1982–1990; 1991–1992; 1994–1995	186

**Most goals for the club in First League**

Rank	Name	Career	Goals
1	(Bulgaria) Stefan Naydenov	1982–1990; 1991–1993	56
2	(Bulgaria) Hristo Nikolov	1958–1967	48
—	(Bulgaria) Valentin Stanchev	1994–1998; 2000–2003	48
4	(Bulgaria) Georgi Arnaudov	1949–1961	42
5	(Bulgaria) Zhivko Gospodinov	1974–1977; 1978–1987; 1988; 1990–1991	41
6	(Bulgaria) Plamen Kazakov	1979–1981; 1982–1990; 1991–1992; 1994–1995	39
7	(Bulgaria) Stefan Stefanov	1949–1961	31
8	(Bulgaria) Ivan Petrov	1974–1984; 1989–1990	30
9	(Bulgaria) Ivan Filipov	1956–1968	29
10	(Bulgaria) Gerasim Kalugerov	1954–2065	27
–	(Bulgaria) Ivo Georgiev	1995–1996; 1998	27

- Players in **bold** are still playing for Spartak.

== Notable players ==
Had international caps for their respective countries, held any club record, or had more than 100 league appearances. Players whose name is listed in bold represented their countries.

Bulgaria

- (Bulgaria) **Ahmed Ahmedov**
- (Bulgaria) **Stefan Aladzhov**
- (Bulgaria) Georgi Arnaudov
- (Bulgaria) Atanas Atanasov
- (Bulgaria) Vasko Boev
- (Bulgaria) **Panteley Dimitrov**
- (Bulgaria) **Zdravko Dimitrov**
- (Bulgaria) **Diyan Donchev**
- (Bulgaria) Trayan Dyankov
- (Bulgaria) **Engibar Engibarov**
- (Bulgaria) **Stanislav Genchev**
- (Bulgaria) **Georgi Georgiev**
- (Bulgaria) **Ivo Georgiev**
- (Bulgaria) **Milen Georgiev**
- (Bulgaria) **Plamen Getov**
- (Bulgaria) **Zhivko Gospodinov**
- (Bulgaria) **Mihail Gyonin**
- (Bulgaria) Boyan Iliev
- (Bulgaria) **Ivo Ivanov**
- (Bulgaria) Dian Kateliev
- (Bulgaria) Plamen Kazakov
- (Bulgaria) **Lyuben Kostov**
- (Bulgaria) **Iliya Kirchev**
- (Bulgaria) **Emil Kremenliev**
- (Bulgaria) **Martin Kushev**
- (Bulgaria) Ventsislav Marinov
- (Bulgaria) **Ivan Minchev**
- (Bulgaria) Viktor Mitev
- (Bulgaria) **Anatoli Nankov**
- (Bulgaria) **Stefan Naydenov**
- (Bulgaria) **Valentin Naydenov**
- (Bulgaria) Hristo Nikolov-Choko
- (Bulgaria) **Ivan Paskov**
- (Bulgaria) Kiril Pandov
- (Bulgaria) Anastas Petrov
- (Bulgaria) Stanislav Petrov
- (Bulgaria) **Dimitar Popov**
- (Bulgaria) **Stoyko Sakaliev**
- (Bulgaria) **Nasko Sirakov**
- (Bulgaria) Genko Slavov
- (Bulgaria) **Emil Spasov**
- (Bulgaria) **Valentin Stanchev**
- (Bulgaria) **Stefan Staykov**
- (Bulgaria) **Dobromir Tashkov**
- (Bulgaria) Radomir Todorov
- (Bulgaria) Dimitar Trendafilov
- (Bulgaria) **Aleksandar Tsvetkov**
- (Bulgaria) **Georgi Tsvetkov**
- (Bulgaria) **Kosta Yanev**
- (Bulgaria) **Ivan Yordanov**
- (Bulgaria) **Stefan Yurukov**
- (Bulgaria) **Krasimir Zafirov**
- (Bulgaria) **Atanas Zehirov**

Europe

- (Armenia) **Razmik Grigoryan**
- (Serbia and Montenegro) **Zoran Banović**
- (Latvia) **Valērijs Ivanovs**
- (Moldova) **Alexandr Belousov**
- (Montenegro) **Marko Simić**

North America

- (Curaçao) **Nathan Holder**
- (Curaçao) (Bonaire) **Liandro Martis**

South America

- (Panama) **Romeesh Ivey**

Africa

- (Guinea) **Pa Konate**
- (Guinea-Bissau) **João Mário**
- (Guinea-Bissau) **Prosper Mendy**

== Personnel ==
=== Club officials ===
Position	Name	Nationality
Coaching staff
Head coach	Rosen Kirilov	(Bulgaria)
Assistant coach	Mihail Tzokov	(Bulgaria)
Assistant coach	Nikolay Grekov	(Bulgaria) (Greece)
Goalkeepers coach	Vitomir Vutov	(Bulgaria)
Youth coach	Dimitar Trendafilov	(Bulgaria)
Youth coach	Radoslav Boyanov	(Bulgaria)
Management
CEO	Martin Zafirov	(Bulgaria)
Sports director	Plamen Getov	(Bulgaria)
Academy manager	Ivan Tsvetanov	(Bulgaria)

=== Manager history ===
Dates	Name	Honours
1932	(Germany) Ferenz Fann	1 A Group Title
1933	(Austria) Dietmar Marius	
1945	(Bulgaria) Aleksandar Kondov	
1949–1950	(Bulgaria) Stefan Kalachev	
1950	(Bulgaria) Kiril Pavlov	
1951	(Bulgaria) Hristo Minkovski	
1952–1954	(Bulgaria) Kiril Pavlov	
1954–1955	(Bulgaria) Trendafil Stankov	
1956–1957	(Bulgaria) Stefan Kalachev	
1958–1964	(Bulgaria) Toma Zahariev	
1964	(Bulgaria) Trendafil Stankov	
1965–1966	(Bulgaria) Petar Minchev	
1966–1967	(Bulgaria) Ivan Radoev	
1967–1969	(Bulgaria) Toma Zahariev	
1969	(Bulgaria) Trendafil Stankov	
1970–1971	(Bulgaria) Stefan Semov	
1971	(Bulgaria) Vladislav Mirchev	
1971	(Bulgaria) Ivan Filipov	
1972	(Bulgaria) Vasil Spasov	
1972–1973	(Bulgaria) Borislav Milenov	
1973–1974	(Bulgaria) Iliya Kirchev	
1974–1975	(Bulgaria) Dobromir Tashkov	
1975–1978	(Bulgaria) Dimitar Doychinov	
1978–1979	(Bulgaria) Iliya Kirchev	
1979–1980	(Bulgaria) Ivan Filipov	
1980	(Bulgaria) Boris Pavlov	
1981	(Bulgaria) Vasil Nenov	
1981–1983	(Bulgaria) Ivan Vutsov	
1983–1985	(Bulgaria) Lyudmil Goranov	

Dates	Name	Honours
1985–1987	(Bulgaria) Ivan Filipov	
1987–1988	(Bulgaria) Evgeni Yanchovski	
1988–1989	(Bulgaria) Blagoy Kalfov	
1989–1990	(Bulgaria) Stancho Bonchev	
1990	(Bulgaria) Ivan Vasilev	
1991–1993	(Bulgaria) Lyudmil Goranov	
1993	(Bulgaria) Blagoy Kalfov	
1993	(Bulgaria) Kiril Ivkov	
1994	(Bulgaria) Krasimir Zafirov	
1994–1995	(Bulgaria) Lyudmil Goranov	
1995–1996	(Bulgaria) Nikola Hristov	
1996–1997	(Bulgaria) Stefan Grozdanov	
1997	(Bulgaria) Ferario Spasov	
1997	(Bulgaria) Blagoy Kalfov	
1998	(Bulgaria) Dimitar Penev	
1998–1999	(Bulgaria) Radoslav Zdravkov	
1999–2000	(Bulgaria) Velislav Vutsov	
2000–2002	(Bulgaria) Stefan Grozdanov	
2002	(Bulgaria) Dimitar Stoychev	
2003	(Bulgaria) Miroslav Mironov	
2004	(Bulgaria) Stefan Grozdanov	
2004	(Bulgaria) Rumen Dimov	
2004	(Bulgaria) Petar Kurdov	
2005	(Bulgaria) Radoslav Zdravkov	
2006	(Bulgaria) Nikolay Stanchev	
2006–2007	(Bulgaria) Miroslav Mironov	
2007	(Bulgaria) Nedelcho Matushev	
2007	(Bulgaria) Georgi Ivanov	
2007–2008	(Bulgaria) Atanas Atanasov	

Dates	Name	Honours
2008	(Bulgaria) Radoslav Zdravkov	
2008	(Serbia) Slobodan Stašević	
2008	(Bulgaria) Ilko Stanchev	
2009	(Serbia) Dragoljub Simonović	
2009	(Bulgaria) Anatolii Kirilov †	
2009	(Bulgaria) Atanas Atanasov	
2009–2010	(Bulgaria) Stoil Trankov	
2010	(Bulgaria) Todor Popov	
2010	(Bulgaria) Deyan Donchev	
2010–2012	(Bulgaria) Dimitar Trendafilov	
2012–2013	(Bulgaria) Ivan Naydenov	
2013–2014	(Bulgaria) Georgi Ivanov	
2014	(Bulgaria) Atanas Atanasov	
2014	(Bulgaria) Zlatko Yankov	
2015	(Italy) Marian Pane	
2015–2016	(Bulgaria) Dimitar Pantev	1 A RFG Title
2016	(Bulgaria) Trayan Dyankov †	
2016–2017	(Bulgaria) Atanas Atanasov (interim)	
2017	(Bulgaria) Ivan Naydenov	
2017	(Bulgaria) Zlatin Mihaylov	
2018–2019	(Bulgaria) Engibar Engibarov	
2019	(Bulgaria) Diyan Bozhilov	
2019–2020	(Greece) Kyriakos Georgiou	
2020–2022	(Bulgaria) Vasil Petrov	
2022	(Bulgaria) Georgi Ivanov*	
2022	(Bulgaria) Todor Kiselichkov	
2023	(Bulgaria) Dimitar Dimitrov	
2023	(Bulgaria) Valentin Iliev	
2023–2024	(Bulgaria) Vasil Petrov	

== Seasons ==
=== Past seasons ===
Results of league and cup competitions by season
Season	League											Bulgarian Cup	Other competitions		Top goalscorer	
Season	Division	Level	P	W	D	L	F	A	GD	Pts	Pos	Bulgarian Cup	Other competitions		Top goalscorer	
2015–16	A Regional Group Varna	4	22	19	0	03	90	20	+70	57	1st	Did not qualify	Cup of AFL	R1		
2016–17	Third League	3	22	4	1	17	21	51	–30	10	12th	Did not qualify	Cup of AFL	R1	(Bulgaria) Ivaylo Rusev	6
2017–18	Third League	3	30	10	6	14	43	61	–18	36	8th	Did not qualify	Cup of AFL	R1	(Bulgaria) Desislav Dyakov	10
2018–19	Third League	3	29	22	7	0	105	19	+86	73	1st	Round of 32	Cup of AFL	R1	(Bulgaria) Rumen Nikolov (Bulgaria) Valentin Veselinov	14
2019–20	Second League	2	22	2	4	15	6	42	–36	10	15th	Round of 32			(Bulgaria) Rumen Nikolov	2
2020–21	Third League	3	28	22	5	1	81	11	+70	71	1st	Round of 32	Cup of AFL	R1	(Bulgaria) Yancho Andreev	13
2021–22	Second League	2	36	21	7	8	64	39	+25	70	3rd	Round of 32			(Bulgaria) Yancho Andreev	12
2022–23	First League	1	35	5	10	20	32	65	–33	25	16th	Quarter-finals			(Ukraine) Denys Balanyuk	5
2023–24	Second League	2	34	23	3	8	60	28	+32	72	1st	Quarter-finals			(Bulgaria) Ahmed Ahmedov	21
2024–25	First League	1	36	15	6	15	45	53	-8	51	7th	Round of 16			(Bulgaria) Ahmed Ahmedov	16
2025–26	First League	1										Qualified				

Key

Champions	Runners-up	Third place	Promoted	Relegated
