= Cape St. Athanasius =

Cape on the Black Sea in Bulgaria

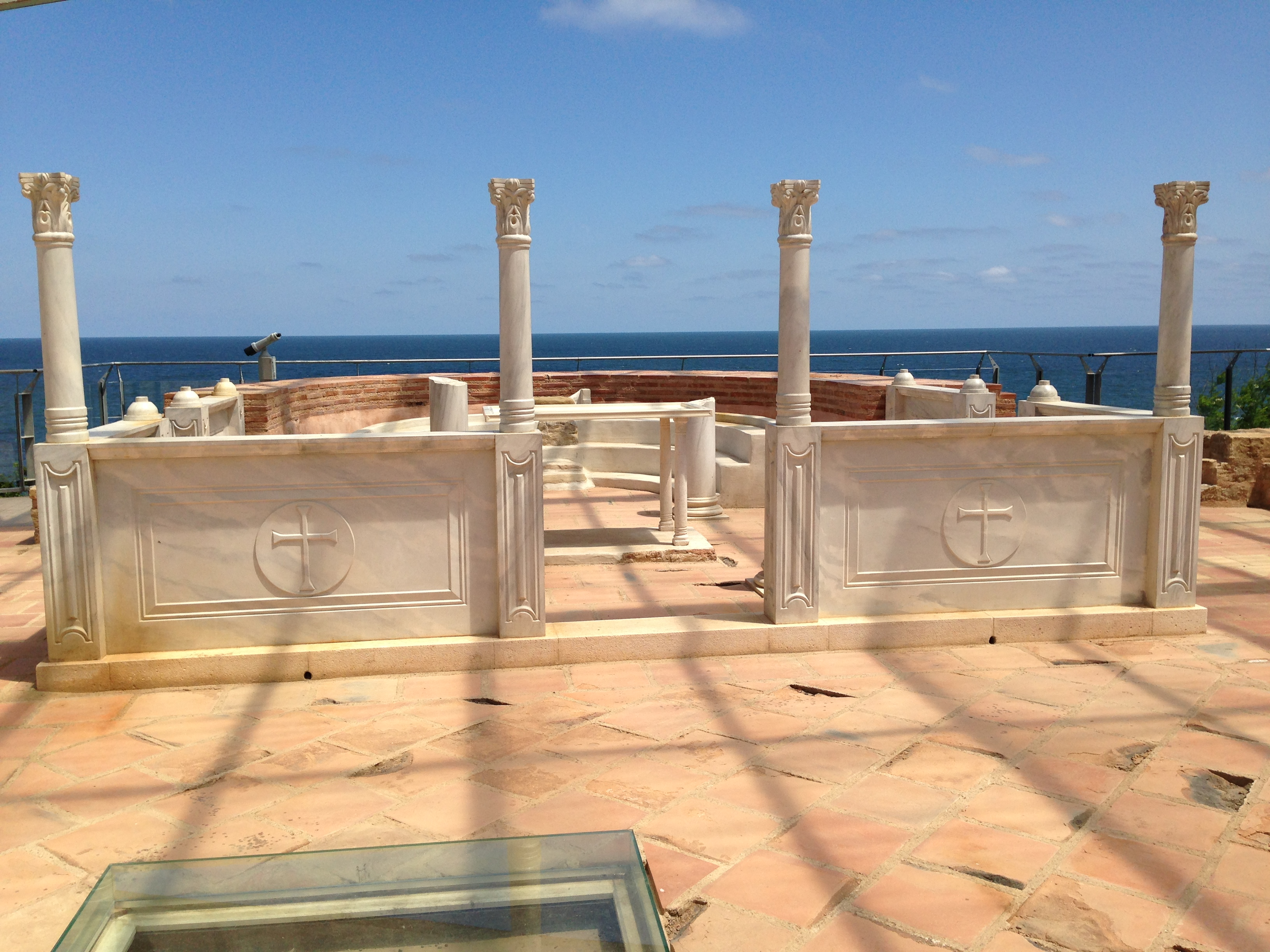
- Baptistry, Cape St. Athanasius

- Location within Bulgaria
- 42°51′17″N 27°54′05″E

Cape of St. Athanasius, also known as Sveti Anastas (Bulgarian: Свети Атанас), is a cape situated on the Black Sea near Byala, Bulgaria. It is home to an archaeological site that has been partially restored by archaeologists. The visible remains primarily date back to the late 6th century AD.

The settlement's origins trace back to the Chalcolithic and continued through the Eneolithic. Additionally, Roman ruins dating from the 2nd–3rd century AD and Thracian religious structures from the 6th–5th century BC are also found in the area.

== Findings ==
Excavations at the site have revealed evidence of human occupation dating back to the 5th to 1st century BC. Among the findings are over 70 pits, along with escharae and fireplaces.

One significant discovery is the remains of a structure believed to be a temple, dating to the 3rd to 1st century BC. Additionally, six votive plates dedicated to Hercules were found within a pit, suggesting the presence of a sanctuary devoted to him during the Roman period.
