= Stefan Grozdanov =

Bulgarian footballer and manager

Personal information
- Full name: Stefan Stoyanov Grozdanov
- Date of birth: 13 March 1946 (age 80)
- Place of birth: Sofia, Bulgaria
- Position: Defender

Senior career*
| Years | Team | Apps | (Gls) |
| 1966–1968 | Spartak Sofia | 16 | (0) |
| 1969–1976 | Etar Veliko Tarnovo | 166 | (2) |
| 1976–1978 | Balkan Botevgrad | | |

Managerial career
- 1989–1990: Bdin Vidin
- 1990–1991: Hebar Pazardzhik
- 1992: Septemvri Sofia
- 1995–1996: Velbazhd Kyustendil
- 1996–1997: Spartak Varna
- 1997–1998: Levski Sofia
- 2000–2002: Spartak Varna
- 2004: Spartak Varna
- 2004–2008: Lokomotiv Sofia
- 2009–2010: Pirin Blagoevgrad
- 2011: Montana
- * Club domestic league appearances and goals

Stefan Stoyanov Grozdanov (Bulgarian: Стефан Стоянов Грозданов) (born 13 March 1946) is a Bulgarian former football player and manager. He coached Bdin Vidin, Hebar Pazardzhik, Septemvri Sofia, Velbazhd Kyustendil, and Spartak Varna.

== Managerial career ==
=== Lokomotiv Sofia ===
In 2004, he took charge of the coaching staff of Lokomotiv Sofia. With the club he achieved the record of eight consecutive matches unbeaten in the European club competitions in the period of 2006 to 2007. He led the club to third place in A PFG twice - in 2006–07 and 2007–08.

In mid-2008 he resigned from coaching Lokomotiv Sofia and after a year without coaching, returned to manage Pirin Blagoevgrad.

=== Montana ===
On 11 June 2011, he was appointed as manager of Montana. During his stay in charge of the team he stabilized the club at the 10th place in the A PFG. He resigned in early December 2011 for family reasons. He achieved three wins, five draws and seven losses while at the helm of Montana.
