= Kiril Pandov (footballer) =

Bulgarian footballer

Personal information
- Born: 25 August 1928 Varna, Kingdom of Bulgaria
- Died: 21 March 2014 Varna, Bulgaria (aged 85)

Sport
- Sport: Football
- Position: Midfielder
- Club: FC Spartak Varna (1946 - 1961)

Kiril Pandov (Bulgarian: Кирил Пандов) (25 August 1928 – 21 March 2014) was a Bulgarian football player. Pandov was a left midfielder. Born in Varna, he played with PFC Spartak Varna and earned 207 caps in Bulgarian first division, scoring 1 goal.
