= Byala, Varna Province =

Byala Бяла
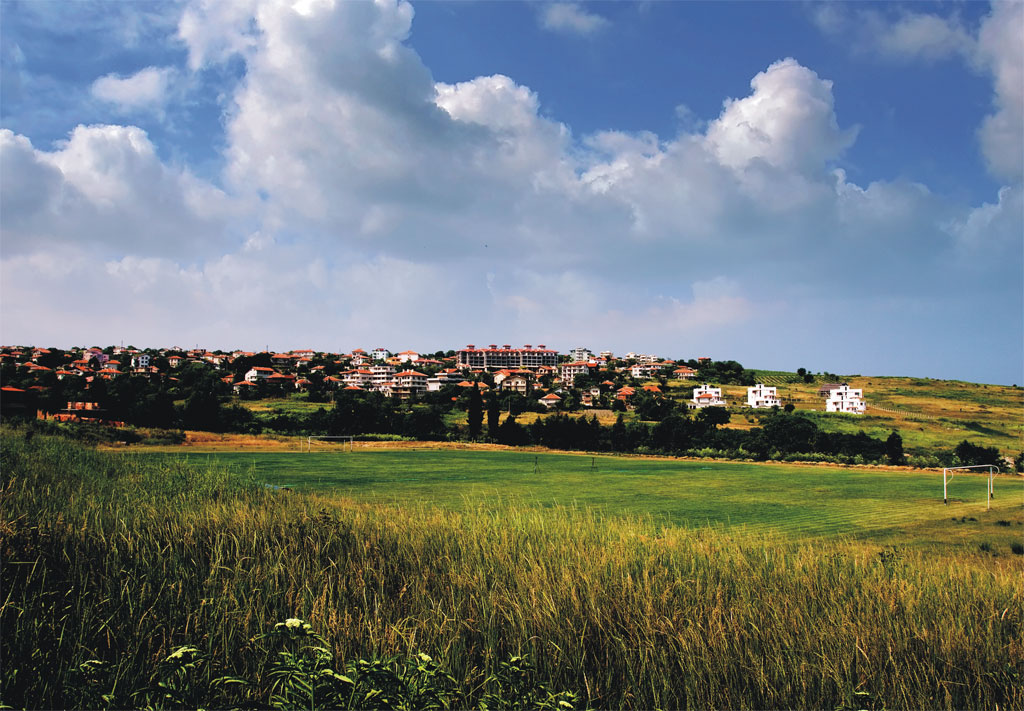
- Overview of Byala, Varna Province

- Location of Byala, Varna Province
- Coordinates: 42°53′N 27°53′E
- Country: Bulgaria
- Provinces (Oblast): Varna

Government
  - Mayor: Anastas Trendafilov
- Elevation: 42 m (138 ft)

Population (15.06.2022)
  - Total: 2,171
- Time zone: UTC+2 (EET)
  - Summer (DST): UTC+3 (EEST)
- Postal Code: 9101
- Area code: 05143

Byala (Bulgarian: Бяла [ˈbʲałɐ] lit. 'white') is a small town and seaside resort in eastern Bulgaria, located on the Bulgarian Black Sea Coast in Varna Province. It is the administrative centre of the homonymous Byala Municipality and lies in a semi-mountainous region in the easternmost branches of Stara Planina about 50 km south of the city of Varna and 70 km north of Burgas. As of June 2022, the town had a population of 2,205.

== History ==
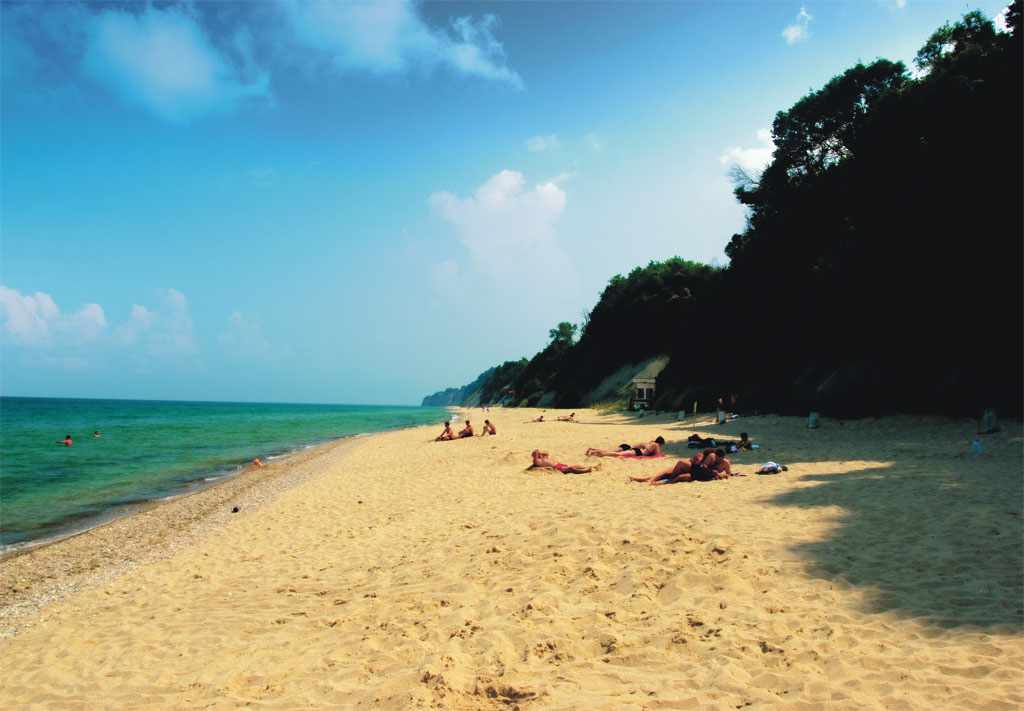
One of Byala's beaches

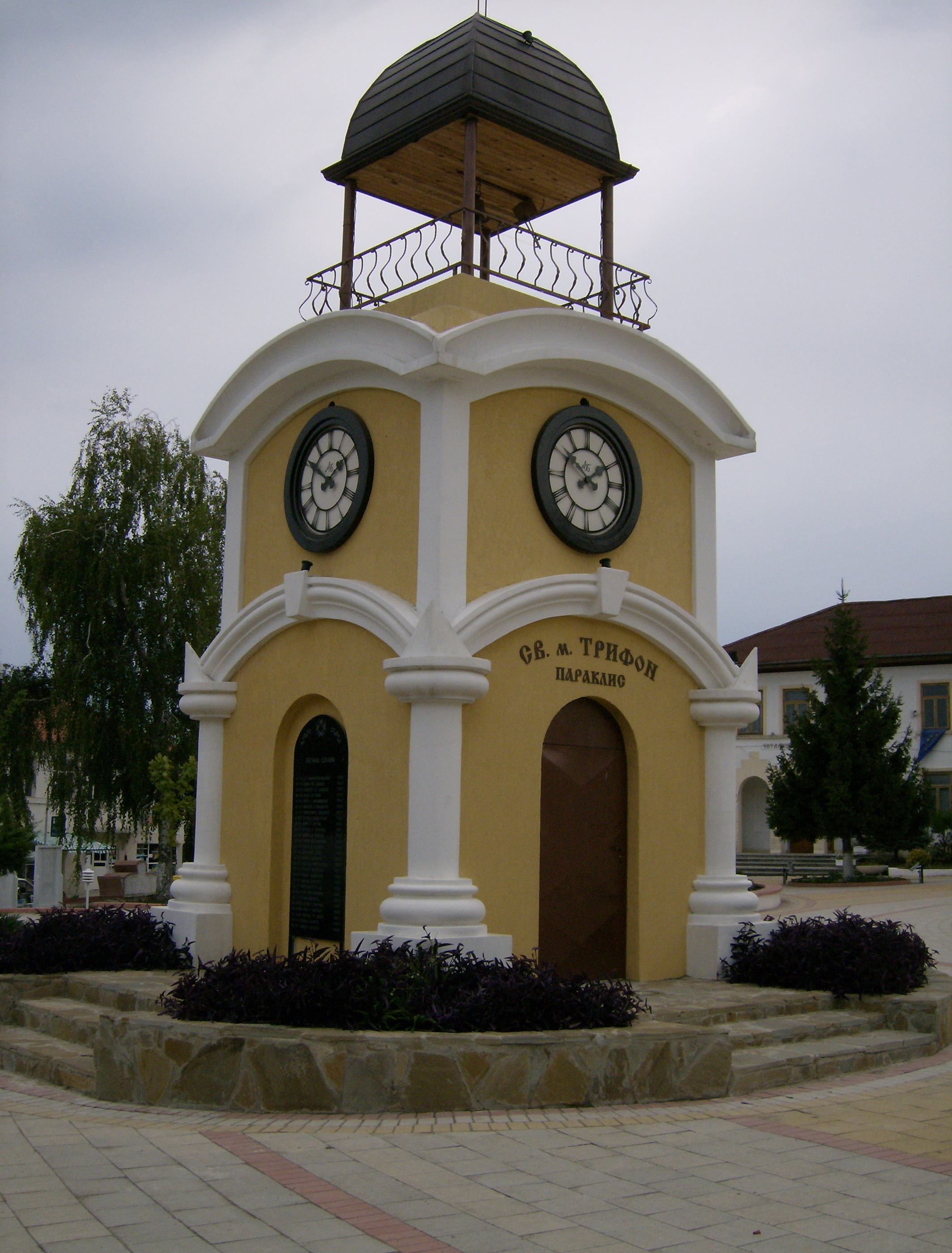
The Chapel of Saint Tryphon

The first known settlement here, near Cape St. Athanasius (Sveti Atanas) just south of town, is dated back to the 6th century BC. Its Greek name was perhaps Larissa, later, Aspros (White). Later the Roman road service station Templum Iovis (Temple of Jupiter, today's Obzor) was erected with a fortress nearby. The region became part of the First Bulgarian Empire in 681 AD; the Bulgarian fortress of Vicha stood later perhaps on cape Beli Nos (Cape White) north of town.

In the Ottoman period (from the late 14th century through 1878), a village known as Akdere (White creek) existed at the town's present location; it was later renamed Byala. A customs office between the Principality of Bulgaria and Eastern Rumelia was temporarily established in 1878. Until the early 1900s, the majority of the population was ethnic Greek; with the population transfers between Bulgaria and Greece following World War I, about 75% of them are now ethnic Bulgarians tracing their ancestry to the village of Athira (Bulgarian: Bozets) in Greek Macedonia. Byala was declared town on 5 September 1984.

== Economy ==
Byala's economy is based mostly on tourism and agriculture, including viticulture. There are several hotels, camping areas and beaches. There are attempts to develop "village tourism", a new concept that is believed to be interesting to foreigners. Nature landmarks outside Byala include Karadere, one of Bulgaria's last remaining wild beaches with pristine dunes and freshwater wetlands, and the White Cliffs (Белите скали, Belite skali) displaying a classic Cretaceous–Paleogene boundary exposure; there is a demonstration centre.

== Cultural buildings ==
- Churches: "Sveta Paraskeva"; "Uspenie Bogorodichno"
- Schools: Elementary School "Otets Paisii" (registered in 1880, built in 1894); Professional High School for Agriculture (founded in 1959); Kindergarten "Parvi yuni"
- Stadium: Chernomoretz (built in 1986, seats 1000)
- Chitalishte: "Probuda" (founded on 1 January 1928, an active local cultural and community centre)
- Museum of Ethnography (founded in 1986)
- Military monuments (mainly commemorating the soldiers who died in World War II)

== Development ==
The town is less developed compared to other tourist areas. The local government supports a few environmental and tourism projects. Byala's port is currently under reconstruction and is planned to become a yacht marina. There has been much new residential building undertaken between 2003 and 2006 due to perceived higher interest from foreign (particularly Danish and Dutch) investors and tourists.

In December 2007, plans were announced for a carbon-neutral resort at Karadere beach, some 3 km north of Byala, Norman Foster's first project in Bulgaria. A series of car free hill towns in a setting of oak forests, meadows and river gorges, Black Sea Gardens will create a year-round community for up to 15,400 residents.

Local groups oppose the project. They say it will turn Karadere beach into a 6-star closed resort complex. The territory is extremely important from an ecological standpoint being part of the Natura 2000 protected zones network and also vital part of bio-diversity zones in Via Pontica for preservation of the habitats of birds.

Due to the wilderness of the territory and lack of any infrastructure, the project needs huge investments and after assessment of these or maybe other reasons, the original investor has backed off (July 2008).

The Bulgarian government's failure to enact regulations outlawing extensive developments in such protected areas may have encouraged the project—even more as Norman Foster's consulting architects company "Projects Ltd." is owned and run by the brother of the Bulgarian Prime Minister.

== See also ==
- Varna
- Burgas
- Kamchia (resort)
