= 1950 Bulgarian Cup final =

- Event: 1950 Bulgarian Cup
Levski Sofia	CSKA Sofia
1	1
- After extra time
- Date: 26 November 1950
- Venue: People's Army Stadium, Sofia
- Referee: Todor Stoyanov (Sofia)
- Attendance: 30,000

1950 Bulgarian Cup final Replay
- Event: 1950 Bulgarian Cup
Levski Sofia	CSKA Sofia
1	1
- After extra time
- Date: 27 November 1950
- Venue: People's Army Stadium, Sofia
- Referee: Todor Stoyanov (Sofia)
- Attendance: 30,000

1950 Bulgarian Cup final 2nd Replay
- Event: 1950 Bulgarian Cup
Levski Sofia	CSKA Sofia
1	0
- After extra time
- Date: 3 December 1950
- Venue: People's Army Stadium, Sofia
- Referee: Todor Stoyanov (Sofia)
- Attendance: 30,000

The 1950 Bulgarian Cup final was the 10th final of the Bulgarian Cup (in this period the tournament was named Cup of the Soviet Army). It was contested by Levski Sofia and CSKA Sofia. It took three matches at People's Army Stadium to determine a winner. The first took place on 26 November, the second on 27 November and the third on 3 December 1950. The cup was won by Levski Sofia. They won the 2nd replay 1–0 after extra time.

== First game ==
Levski Sofia 1–1 (a.e.t.) CSKA Sofia

- Goalscorers: Hranov 61'; Panayotov 76'
  - Levski: Spas Andreev, Dimitar Iliev, Ivan Dimchev (c), Amedeo Kleva, Dimitar Doychinov (28' Georgi Kardashev), Angel Petrov, Borislav Tsvetkov, Dragan Georgiev, Arsen Dimitrov, Lyubomir Hranov, Yordan Tomov
  - CSKA': Stefan Gerenski, Georgi Tsvetkov, Manol Manolov, Georgi Nasev, Atanas Tsanov, Gavril Stoyanov, Stefan Stefanov, Stefan Bozhkov (c), Panayot Panayotov, Kostadin Blagoev, Gocho Rusev (24' Asen Panayotov)
- Date: 26 November 1950
- Stadium: People's Army Stadium
- Attendance: 30,000

== Second game ==
Levski Sofia 1–1 (a.e.t.) CSKA Sofia

- Goalscorers: Takev 75'; Bozhkov 2'
  - Levski: Dimitar Elenkov, Atanas Dinev (c), Dimitar Iliev, Amedeo Kleva, Dragan Georgiev, Angel Petrov, Borislav Tsvetkov, Todor Takev, Arsen Dimitrov, Lyubomir Hranov (red card) 29', Yordan Tomov
  - CSKA': Stefan Gerenski, Georgi Tsvetkov, Manol Manolov, Borislav Futekov, Atanas Tsanov (red card) 36', Gavril Stoyanov, Stefan Stefanov, Stefan Bozhkov (c), Stoyne Minev, Gancho Vasilev, Kiril Bogdanov
- Date: 27 November 1950
- Stadium: People's Army Stadium
- Attendance: 30,000

== Third game ==
=== Details ===
3 December 1950

Levski Sofia	1–0 (a.e.t.)	CSKA Sofia
Tomov 99'

People's Army Stadium, Sofia
Attendance: 30,000
Referee: Todor Stoyanov (Sofia)

Levski	CSKA

GK	1	(Bulgaria) Spas Andreev	(substituted off) 20'
DF	2	(Bulgaria) Atanas Dinev
DF	3	(Bulgaria) Dimitar Iliev
DF	4	(Italy) Amedeo Kleva
MF	5	(Bulgaria) Ivan Dimchev (c)
MF	6	(Bulgaria) Angel Petrov
FW	7	(Bulgaria) Borislav Tsvetkov
FW	8	(Bulgaria) Todor Takev
FW	9	(Bulgaria) Arsen Dimitrov
FW	10	(Bulgaria) Dragan Georgiev
FW	11	(Bulgaria) Yordan Tomov
Substitutes:
GK	--	(Bulgaria) Dimitar Elenkov	(substituted in) 20'
Manager:
(Bulgaria) Ivan Radoev

GK	1	(Bulgaria) Stefan Gerenski
DF	2	(Bulgaria) Borislav Futekov
DF	3	(Bulgaria) Manol Manolov
DF	4	(Bulgaria) Georgi Nasev
MF	5	(Bulgaria) Gavril Stoyanov
MF	6	(Bulgaria) Asen Panayotov
FW	7	(Bulgaria) Stoyne Minev
MF	8	(Bulgaria) Stefan Bozhkov (c)
FW	9	(Bulgaria) Panayot Panayotov
FW	10	(Bulgaria) Gancho Vasilev
FW	11	(Bulgaria) Stefan Stefanov
Substitutes:
Manager:
(Bulgaria) Krum Milev

== See also ==
- 1950 A Group
