= 1946 Bulgarian Cup final =

Final of the Bulgarian Cup

- Event: 1946 Bulgarian Cup
Levski Sofia	Chernolomets Popovo
4	1
- Date: 6 May 1946
- Venue: Yunak Stadium, Sofia
- Referee: Dimitar Topalov (Varna)
- Attendance: 15,000

The 1946 Bulgarian Cup final was the 6th final of the Bulgarian Cup (in this period the tournament was named Cup of the Soviet Army), and was contested between Levski Sofia and Chernolomets Popovo on 6 May 1946 at Yunak Stadium in Sofia. Levski won the final 4–1.

== Route to the Final ==
Levski		Round	Chernolomets
Opponent	Result		Opponent	Result
Marek Dupnitsa	3–2	Preliminary round
Hebros Harmanli	7–0 home	Round of 16	Yantra Gabrovo	3–0 home
Bdin Vidin	1–0 home	Quarter-finals	Belite orli Pleven	3–1 home
Lokomotiv Plovdiv	3–0 away	Semi-finals	Lokomotiv Ruse	1–1 home / 3–2

== Match ==
=== Details ===
6 May 1946
17:00 EEST

Levski Sofia	4−1	Chernolomets Popovo
Laskov 8', 31', 40'; Nikushev 80' (pen.)		St. Petrov 67'

Yunak Stadium, Sofia
Attendance: 15,000
Referee: Dimitar Topalov (Varna)

Levski	Chernolomets

GK	1	(Bulgaria) Apostol Sokolov
DF	2	(Bulgaria) Stefan Metodiev
DF	3	(Bulgaria) Stefan Nikushev (c)
MF	4	(Bulgaria) Kostadin Georgiev
DF	5	(Bulgaria) Lyubomir Petrov
MF	6	(Bulgaria) Angel Petrov
FW	7	(Bulgaria) Borislav Tsvetkov
FW	8	(Bulgaria) Vasil Spasov
FW	9	(Bulgaria) Bozhin Laskov
MF	10	(Bulgaria) Lyubomir Hranov
FW	11	(Bulgaria) Petar Argirov
Manager:
(Bulgaria) Ivan Radoev

GK	1	(Bulgaria) Dimitar Karakachanov
DF	2	(Bulgaria) Petar Draganchev
DF	3	(Bulgaria) Kiril Karastoyanov
DF	4	(Bulgaria) Yonko Kuzmanov
MF	5	(Bulgaria) Lyuben Shubrakov
MF	6	(Bulgaria) Petar Petrov (c)
FW	7	(Bulgaria) Stoyan Petrov
MF	8	(Bulgaria) Rasho Bobchev
FW	9	(Bulgaria) Stefan Bachvarov
MF	10	(Bulgaria) Todor Popov
FW	11	(Bulgaria) Ivan Gachev
Manager:

== See also ==
- 1946 Bulgarian Republic Football Championship
