= 1948–49 PFC Cherno More Varna season =

Cherno More Varna
1948–49 season
- Manager: Ivan Mokanov
- Republican Football Division: 6th
- Bulgarian Cup: First Round
- Top goalscorer: Nedko Nedev (11)

The 1948–49 season was the inaugural season of A group under the name Republican Football Division (Bulgarian: Републиканска футболна дивизия). Cherno More started the season as TVP but was renamed after the first round to Botev pri DNV (Bulgarian: Ботев при ДНВ), a common practice in the years after the establishment of the People's Republic of Bulgaria. Botev is 19th-century Bulgarian revolutionary and poet Hristo Botev and pri DNV stands for Home of the People's Army (Bulgarian: Дом на народната войска).

== Republican Football Division ==
=== Matches ===
10 October 1948 Round 1	Slavia Plovdiv	1 – 1	Botev pri DNV	Plovdiv
	Bachvarov 2'		Dzhurov 43'

17 October 1948 Round 2	Botev pri DNV	2 – 0	CDNV	Varna
	Terzistoev 38'; Ganchev 57'			Attendance: 8,000

24 October 1948 Round 3	Botev Burgas	2 – 4	Botev pri DNV	Burgas
	Toledjian 4'; Mandalchev 32'		Nedev 20'; Konakov 24' 76'; Petrov 57'

31 October 1948 Round 4	Botev pri DNV	2 – 3	Levski Sofia	Varna
	Terzistoev 14'; Nedev 36'		Apostolov 20' (o.g.); Kardashev 51'; Tomov 83'	Attendance: 12,000

12 December 1948 Round 5	Spartak Sofia	1 – 0	Botev pri DNV	Sofia
	Konyarov 49'			Attendance: 10,000

14 November 1948 Round 6	Botev pri DNV	1 – 0	Lokomotiv Sofia	Varna
	Konakov 66'			Attendance: 10,000

21 November 1948 Round 7	Benkovski Vidin	2 – 2	Botev pri DNV	Vidin
	Marinov 77'; Enchev 88' (pen.)		Radev 4'; Nedev 58'	Attendance: 4,000

28 November 1948 Round 8	Botev pri DNV	1 – 0	Slavia Sofia	Varna
	Konakov 14'			Attendance: 8,000

5 December 1948 Round 9	Botev pri DNV	3 – 2	Marek Dupnitsa	Varna
	Konakov 15'; Nedev 52' 61'		Vasilev 51'; Lyuben Kolarov 70'	Attendance: 9,000

20 March 1949 Round 10	Botev pri DNV	0 – 1	Slavia Plovdiv	Varna
			Furnadzhiev 35'

27 March 1949 Round 11	CDNV	3 – 1	Botev pri DNV	Sofia
	Stefanov 4' 65'; Bozhilov 70'		Kovachev 35'

10 April 1949 Round 12	Botev pri DNV	2 – 1	Botev Burgas	Varna
	Kovachev 39'; Radev 54'		Zhelev 55'

24 April 1949 Round 13	Levski Sofia	4 – 2	Botev pri DNV	Sofia
	Hranov 20'; Dimitrov 35'; Tsvetkov 50' 58'		Nedev 10'; Konakov 76'

22 May 1949 Round 14	Botev pri DNV	3 – 1	Spartak Sofia	Varna
	Kovachev 3'; Radev 17' 70'		Stankov 58'

30 May 1949 Round 15	Lokomotiv Sofia	1 – 0	Botev pri DNV	Sofia
	Delev 90'

4 June 1949 Round 16	Botev pri DNV	2 – 1	Benkovski Vidin	Varna
	Videnov 5' (o.g.); Nedev 30'		Bashinovski 52'

13 June 1949 Round 17	Slavia Sofia	1 – 3	Botev pri DNV	Sofia
	Nenov 27'		Nedev 19' 55' 70'

16 July 1949 Round 18	Marek Dupnitsa	1 – 1	Botev pri DNV	Dupnitsa
	Krastev 84' (pen.)		Stefanov 70'

=== League standings ===
Pos	Team	Pld	W	D	L	GF	GA	GD	Pts
4	Slavia Sofia	18	9	3	6	29	20	+9	21
5	Spartak Sofia	18	8	5	5	23	18	+5	21
6	Cherno More Varna	18	9	3	6	30	25	+5	21
7	Slavia Plovdiv	18	4	8	6	16	21	−5	16
8	Marek Dupnitsa	18	2	4	12	16	42	−26	8

Source: rsssf.com

=== Results summary ===
Overall								Home						Away					
Pld	W	D	L	GF	GA	GD	Pts	W	D	L	GF	GA	GD	W	D	L	GF	GA	GD
18	9	3	6	30	25	+5	30	7	0	2	16	9	+7	2	3	4	14	16	−2

=== Goalscorers ===
Rank	Scorer	Goals
1	(Bulgaria) Nedko Nedev	11
2	(Bulgaria) Hristo Konakov	6
3	(Bulgaria) Georgi Radev	4
4	(Bulgaria) Borislav Kovachev	3
5	(Bulgaria) Todor Terzistoev	2
6	(Bulgaria) Mladen Dzhurov	1
6	(Bulgaria) Nikola Ganchev	1
6	(Bulgaria) Asen Petrov	1
6	(Bulgaria) Dimitar Stefanov	1

== Bulgarian Cup ==
3 April 1949 First Round	Torpedo Pernik	2–1	Botev pri DNV	Pernik

- Torpedo Pernik is a former name of Minyor Pernik
