= 1949 Bulgarian Cup final =

Levski Sofia	CSKA Sofia
1	1
- After extra time
- Date: 8 May 1949
- Venue: Yunak Stadium, Sofia
- Referee: Todor Stoyanov (Sofia)
- Attendance: 35,000

1949 Bulgarian Cup final Replay
Levski Sofia	CSKA Sofia
2	2
- After extra time
- Date: 16 May 1949
- Venue: Yunak Stadium, Sofia
- Referee: Stefan Danchev (Varna)
- Attendance: 35,000

1949 Bulgarian Cup final 2nd Replay
Levski Sofia	CSKA Sofia
2	1
- After extra time
- Date: 17 May 1949
- Venue: Yunak Stadium, Sofia
- Referee: Stefan Danchev (Varna)
- Attendance: 35,000

The 1949 Bulgarian Cup final was the 9th final of the Bulgarian Cup (in this period the tournament was named Cup of the Soviet Army). It was contested by Levski Sofia and CSKA Sofia. It took three matches at Yunak Stadium to determine a winner. The first took place on 8 May, the second on 16 May and the third on 17 May 1949. The cup was won by Levski Sofia. They won the 2nd replay 2–1 after extra time.

== First game ==
Levski Sofia 1–1 (a.e.t.) CSKA Sofia

- Goalscorers: K. Georgiev 81'; Stefanov 6'
  - Levski: Apostol Sokolov, Stefan Metodiev (c), Ivan Dimchev, Amedeo Kleva, Kostadin Georgiev, Dimitar Doychinov, Borislav Tsvetkov, Vasil Spasov, Georgi Pachedzhiev, Lyubomir Hranov, Arsen Dimitrov
  - CSKA: Panko Georgiev, Borislav Futekov, Boris Trankov (c), Dimitar Tsvetkov, Atanas Tsanov, Manol Manolov, Dimitar Milanov, Kostadin Blagoev, Stefan Bozhkov, Gancho Vasilev, Stefan Stefanov
- Date: 8 May 1949
- Stadium: Yunak Stadium
- Attendance: 35,000

== Second game ==
Levski Sofia 2–2 (a.e.t.) CSKA Sofia

- Goalscorers: A. Dimitrov 56', 59'; Bogdanov 36', Milanov 51'
  - Levski: Apostol Sokolov, Atanas Dinev, Ivan Dimchev (c), Amedeo Kleva, Kostadin Georgiev, Angel Petrov, Borislav Tsvetkov, Vasil Spasov, Georgi Kardashev, Lyubomir Hranov, Arsen Dimitrov
  - CSKA: Panko Georgiev, Borislav Futekov, Boris Trankov (c), Dimitar Tsvetkov, Nikola Aleksiev, Manol Manolov, Dimitar Milanov, Gancho Vasilev, Stefan Stefanov, Stefan Bozhkov, Kiril Bogdanov
- Date: 16 May 1949
- Stadium: Yunak Stadium
- Attendance: 35,000

== Third game ==
=== Details ===
17 May 1949

Levski Sofia	2−1 (a.e.t.)	CSKA Sofia
Spasov 78'; A. Dimitrov 113'		Bozhilov 2' (pen.)

Yunak Stadium, Sofia
Attendance: 35,000
Referee: Stefan Danchev (Varna)

Levski	CSKA

GK	1	(Bulgaria) Apostol Sokolov
DF	2	(Bulgaria) Stefan Metodiev (c)
DF	3	(Bulgaria) Ivan Dimchev
DF	4	(Italy) Amedeo Kleva
MF	5	(Bulgaria) Kostadin Georgiev
MF	6	(Bulgaria) Dragan Georgiev
FW	7	(Bulgaria) Borislav Tsvetkov
FW	8	(Bulgaria) Vasil Spasov
FW	9	(Bulgaria) Georgi Kardashev
FW	10	(Bulgaria) Georgi Pachedzhiev
FW	11	(Bulgaria) Arsen Dimitrov
Manager:
(Hungary) Rezső Somlai

GK	1	(Bulgaria) Panko Georgiev
DF	2	(Bulgaria) Manol Manolov
DF	3	(Bulgaria) Boris Trankov
DF	4	(Bulgaria) Borislav Futekov
MF	5	(Bulgaria) Atanas Tsanov
MF	6	(Bulgaria) Nako Chakmakov (c)
FW	7	(Bulgaria) Dimitar Milanov
FW	8	(Bulgaria) Stoyne Minev
FW	9	(Bulgaria) Stefan Bozhkov
FW	10	(Bulgaria) Nikola Bozhilov
FW	11	(Bulgaria) Stefan Stefanov
Manager:
(Bulgaria) Krum Milev

== See also ==
- 1948–49 A Group
