= Apostol Sokolov =

Bulgarian footballer

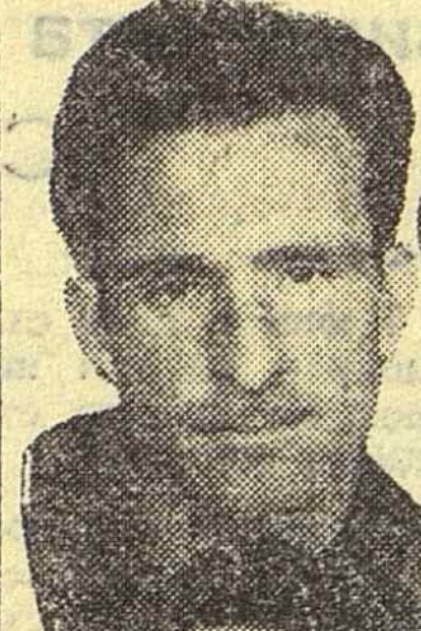

Personal information
- Full name: Apostol Zlatkov Sokolov
- Date of birth: 23 October 1917
- Place of birth: Sofia, Bulgaria
- Date of death: 12 June 1987 (aged 69)
- Position: Goalkeeper

Youth career
- FC Bulgaria Sofia

Senior career*
Years	Team	Apps	(Gls)
1939–1940	Levski Sofia	3	(0)
1940–1944	Prince Kiril Sofia		
1944–1949	Levski Sofia	51	(0)
1949–1954	Spartak Sofia		

International career
1947–1953	Bulgaria	15	(0)

Managerial career
- 1956–1957: Spartak Plovdiv
- 1965–1966: Lokomotiv GO
- * Club domestic league appearances and goals

Apostol Sokolov (Bulgarian: Апостол Соколов; 23 October 1917 – 12 June 1987), nicknamed Potso, was a Bulgarian football goalkeeper. On club level, he played for Levski Sofia, Prince Kiril Sofia and Spartak Sofia. Playing 15 times for Bulgaria during the 1940s and 1950s, Sokolov represented them at the 1952 Summer Olympics.

He is regarded as the first goalkeeper who began to leave the goal line like modern keepers and even Lev Yashin said Sokolov was his inspiration.

His son Georgi Sokolov played as a winger or forward for Levski Sofia and Bulgaria.

== Career ==
"That blond devil played high up and blocked any forward who might get behind the defence. It was something completely new to me, but I followed his example."

— Lev Yashin in 1952

=== Club career ===
Sokolov started his career with FC Bulgaria Sofia. In 1939 he joined Levski Sofia. After six first-team games (three for State Championship and three for Tsar's Cup) Sokolov moved to Spartak Sofia. Then he played for Prince Kiril Sofia, before returned to Levski in 1944.

On 1 June 1947, Sokolov saved a crucial penalty in the Bulgarian Cup final against Botev Plovdiv to help Levski beat 1–0. With Levski he won two Republic Championship titles, one A Group title and three Bulgarian Cups.

=== International career ===
Sokolov made his first appearance for the Bulgarian national team on 6 July 1947, at the age of 29, in a 3–2 home loss against Romania for the Balkan Cup. He kept four clean sheets during his time with the national team. Sokolov was included in the Bulgarian squad for 1952 Summer Olympics, and played in a 2–1 loss against Soviet Union on 15 July. The last of his 15 caps came in the 1954 World Cup qualifier against Czechoslovakia on 8 November 1953, which ended 0–0.

== Honours ==
=== Club ===
Levski Sofia

- Republic Championship (2): 1946, 1947
- A Group (1): 1948–49
- Bulgarian Cup (3): 1946, 1947, 1949
