= 1947 Bulgarian Cup final =

- Event: 1947 Bulgarian Cup
Levski Sofia	Botev Plovdiv
1	0
- Date: 1 June 1947
- Venue: Yunak Stadium, Sofia
- Referee: Todor Stoyanov (Sofia)
- Attendance: 17,000

The 1947 Bulgarian Cup final was the 7th final of the Bulgarian Cup (in this period the tournament was named Cup of the Soviet Army), and was contested between Levski Sofia and Botev Plovdiv on 1 June 1947 at Yunak Stadium in Sofia. Levski Sofia won the final 1–0.

== Match ==
=== Details ===
1 June 1947

Levski Sofia	1−0	Botev Plovdiv
Spasov 37' (pen.)

Yunak Stadium, Sofia
Attendance: 17,000
Referee: Todor Stoyanov (Sofia)

Levski	Botev

GK	1	(Bulgaria) Apostol Sokolov
DF	2	(Bulgaria) Stefan Metodiev
DF	3	(Bulgaria) Lyubomir Petrov
DF	4	(Bulgaria) Atanas Dinev
MF	5	(Bulgaria) Petar Moskov
MF	6	(Bulgaria) Kostadin Georgiev
FW	7	(Bulgaria) Borislav Tsvetkov
FW	8	(Bulgaria) Vasil Spasov (c)
FW	9	(Bulgaria) Georgi Rusev
MF	10	(Bulgaria) Dimitar Doychinov
FW	11	(Bulgaria) Arsen Dimitrov
Manager:
(Bulgaria) Ivan Radoev

GK	1	(Bulgaria) Georgi Kekemanov
DF	2	(Bulgaria) Georgi Zahariev (c)
DF	3	(Bulgaria) Nikola Milev
DF	4	(Bulgaria) Petar Damchev
DF	5	(Bulgaria) Petar Yonov
MF	6	(Bulgaria) Petar Tseluykov
FW	7	(Bulgaria) Nikola Lambrev
MF	8	(Bulgaria) Atanas Nikolov
FW	9	(Bulgaria) Todor Todorov
MF	10	(Bulgaria) Nayden Chalakov
FW	11	(Bulgaria) Kostadin Angelov
Manager:
(Bulgaria) Vasil Kutsarov

== See also ==
- 1947 Bulgarian Republic Football Championship
