= 1950 A Group =

6th season of top-tier football league in Bulgaria

A Group
- Season: 1950
- Champions: Levski Sofia (7th title)
- Relegated: Lokomotiv Sofia; Marek
- Matches: 90
- Goals: 249 (2.77 per match)
- Top goalscorer: Lyubomir Hranov (11 goals)

The 1950 A Group was the second season of the A Football Group, the top Bulgarian professional league for association football clubs, since its establishment in 1948.

== Overview ==
It was contested by 10 teams, and Levski Sofia, the defending champions, won the championship.

=== Teams ===
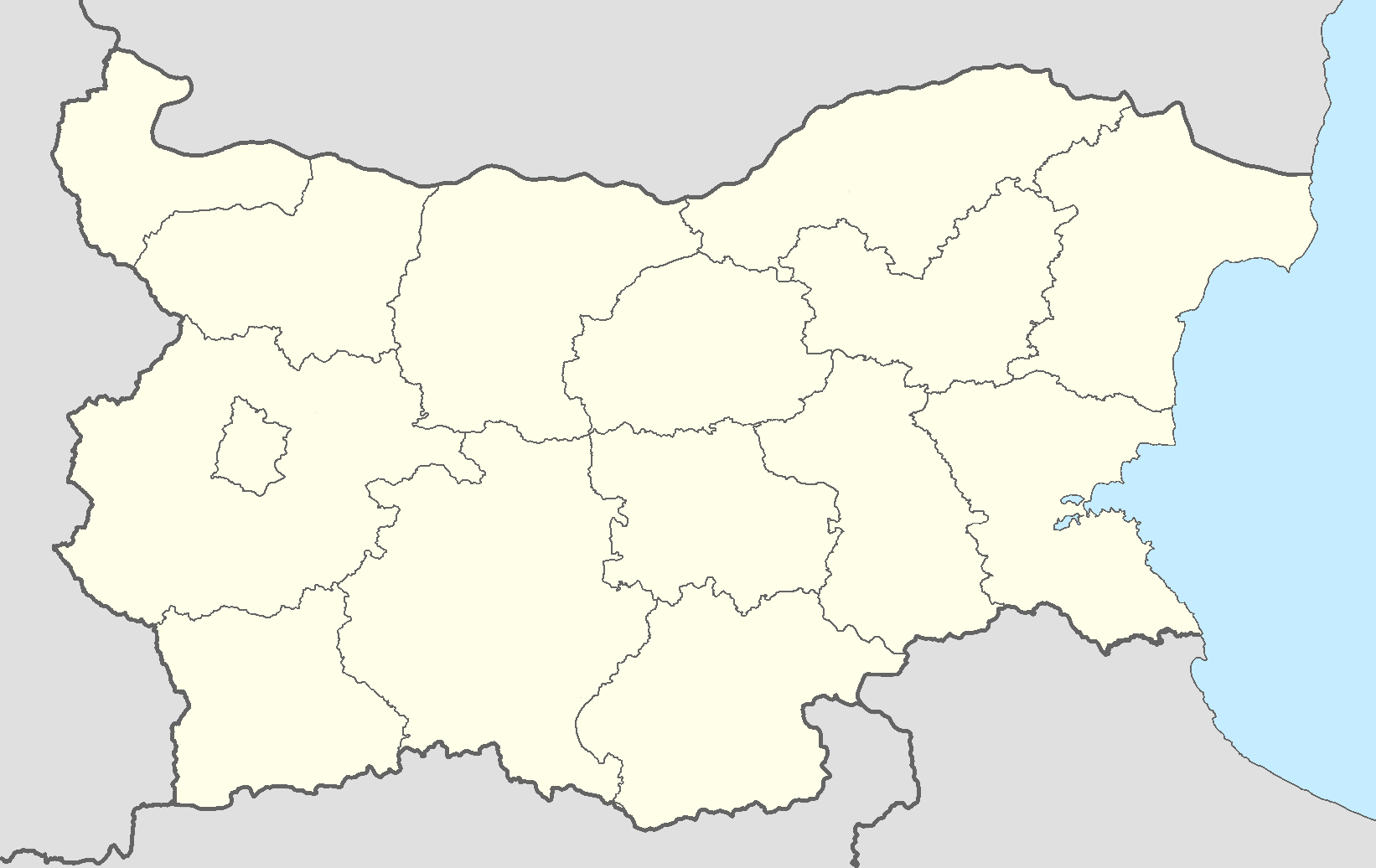
Location of teams in the 1948-49 A Group

== League standings ==
Pos	Team	Pld	W	D	L	GF	GA	GD	Pts	Relegation
1	Levski Sofia (C)	18	12	5	1	36	12	+24	29	
2	Slavia Sofia	18	11	5	2	31	12	+19	27	
3	Akademik Sofia	18	10	2	6	40	20	+20	22	
4	CSKA Sofia	18	9	4	5	22	12	+10	22	
5	Spartak Varna	18	10	2	6	37	27	+10	22	
6	Cerveno Zname Sofia	18	7	2	9	20	29	−9	16	
7	Lokomotiv Plovdiv	18	5	4	9	19	34	−15	14	
8	Spartak Pleven	18	3	6	9	19	27	−8	12	
9	Lokomotiv Sofia (R)	18	4	2	12	16	29	−13	10	Relegation to 1951 B Group
10	Marek Dupnitsa (R)	18	2	2	14	9	47	−38	6	Relegation to 1951 B Group

Source: rsssf.com
(C) Champions; (R) Relegated

== Results ==
Home \ Away	AKD	CHZ	CSK	LEV	LPL	LSO	MAR	SLA	SPL	SPV
Akademik Sofia		1–2	1–0	0–1	6–2	1–0	8–1	1–2	4–0	1–2
Cerveno Zname Sofia	1–0		0–1	0–2	1–1	2–0	2–1	1–3	2–0	0–2
CSKA Sofia	1–2	0–1		0–0	2–1	2–1	3–0	0–0	1–0	4–1
Levski Sofia	0–0	3–0	1–0		5–2	1–0	3–0	0–0	3–1	1–0
Lokomotiv Plovdiv	1–0	3–2	1–2	0–4		0–0	0–0	2–1	1–0	1–4
Lokomotiv Sofia	1–2	2–1	1–4	2–4	1–0		0–1	0–2	2–0	0–1
Marek Dupnitsa	1–4	1–3	0–1	1–3	1–0	1–2		0–0	1–4	0–6
Slavia Sofia	1–3	6–2	1–0	1–1	2–0	3–1	3–0		0–0	3–0
Spartak Pleven	3–3	3–0	0–0	1–1	2–2	0–0	2–0	0–1		2–3
Spartak Varna	1–3	0–0	1–1	4–3	1–2	4–3	3–0	1–2	3–1	

Source: A PFG (in Bulgarian)
Legend: Blue = home team win; Yellow = draw; Red = away team win.

== Champions ==
Levski Sofia

Goalkeepers
(Bulgaria) Spas Andreev	14	(0)
(Bulgaria) Dimitar Elenkov	4	(0)

Defenders
(Bulgaria) Dimitar Iliev	3	(0)
(Bulgaria) Atanas Dinev	16	(0)
(Italy) Amedeo Kleva	18	(0)
(Bulgaria) Ivan Dimchev	18	(0)

Midfielders
(Bulgaria) Angel Petrov	2	(1)
(Bulgaria) Todor Takev	0	(0)
(Bulgaria) Dimitar Doychinov	16	(3)
(Bulgaria) Kostadin Georgiev	3	(0)
(Bulgaria) Aleksandar Krastev	1	(0)
(Bulgaria) Dragan Georgiev	18	(1)
(Bulgaria) Lyubomir Hranov	17	(11)

Forwards
(Bulgaria) Borislav Tsvetkov	16	(2)
(Bulgaria) Arsen Dimitrov	18	(8)
(Bulgaria) Yordan Tomov	18	(8)
(Bulgaria) Georgi Filipov	1	(0)
(Bulgaria) Georgi Kardashev	15	(2)

Manager
(Bulgaria) Ivan Radoev

== Top scorers ==
Rank	Scorer	Club	Goals
1	(Bulgaria) Lyubomir Hranov	Levski Sofia	11
2	(Bulgaria) Dobromir Tashkov	Spartak Varna	8
2	(Bulgaria) Yordan Tomov	Levski Sofia	8
2	(Bulgaria) Arsen Dimitrov	Levski Sofia	8
2	(Bulgaria) Vasil Spasov	Akademik Sofia	8
2	(Bulgaria) Stefan Getsov	Akademik Sofia	8
