= 1950 Bulgarian Cup =

Tournament details
- Country: Bulgaria

Final positions
- Champions: Levski Sofia (5th cup)
- Runners-up: CSKA Sofia

Tournament statistics
- Top goal scorer(s): Todor Takev (Levski); Kostadin Blagoev (CSKA); Dimitar Palev (Spartak Pl) (3 goals)

The 1950 Bulgarian Cup was the 10th season of the Bulgarian Cup (in this period the tournament was named Cup of the Soviet Army). Levski Sofia won the competition after three games in the final against CSKA Sofia.

== First round ==
Team 1	Score	Team 2
Levski Sofia	3–1	Sportist Svoge
Lokomotiv Sofia	4–2	Spartak Varna
Chernomorets Burgas	0–1	Slavia Sofia
Dunav Ruse	0–2	Spartak Pleven
Akademik Sofia	3–0 (w/o)	Minyor Pernik
Marek Dupnitsa	1–3	Cherveno Zname Sofia
Lokomotiv Plovdiv	0–1 (a.e.t.)	CSKA Sofia
Torpedo Pleven	2–2 (a.e.t.)	Spartak Sofia
Replay
Torpedo Pleven	0–3	Spartak Sofia

== Quarter-finals ==
Team 1	Score	Team 2
CSKA Sofia	2–0	Lokomotiv Sofia
Spartak Pleven	4–0	Slavia Sofia
Levski Sofia	3–0	Spartak Sofia
Akademik Sofia	3–0	Cherveno Zname Sofia

== Semi-finals ==
Team 1	Score	Team 2
Spartak Pleven	0–1	Levski Sofia
CSKA Sofia	0–0 (a.e.t.)	Akademik Sofia
Replay
CSKA Sofia	4–1	Akademik Sofia

== Final ==
=== First game ===
26 November 1950

Levski Sofia	1−1 (a.e.t.)	CSKA Sofia
Hranov 61'		Panayotov 76'

People's Army Stadium, Sofia
Attendance: 30,000
Referee: Todor Stoyanov (Sofia)

=== Second game ===
27 November 1950

Levski Sofia	1−1 (a.e.t.)	CSKA Sofia
Takev 75'		Bozhkov 2'

People's Army Stadium, Sofia
Attendance: 30,000
Referee: Todor Stoyanov (Sofia)

=== Third game ===
3 December 1950

Levski Sofia	1−0 (a.e.t.)	CSKA Sofia
Tomov 99'

People's Army Stadium, Sofia
Attendance: 30,000
Referee: Todor Stoyanov (Sofia)
