= 1951 A Group =

7th season of top-tier football league in Bulgaria

A Group
- Season: 1951
- Champions: CSKA Sofia (2nd title)
- Matches played: 132
- Goals scored: 365 (2.77 per match)
- Top goalscorer: Dimitar Milanov (13 goals)

The 1951 A Group was the third season of the A Football Group, the top Bulgarian professional league for association football clubs, since its establishment in 1948.

== Overview ==
It was contested by 12 teams, and CSKA Sofia won the championship for their second title.

== League standings ==
Pos	Team	Pld	W	D	L	GF	GA	GD	Pts	Relegation
1	CSKA Sofia (C)	22	18	1	3	62	7	+55	37	
2	Spartak Sofia	22	14	8	0	27	7	+20	36	
3	Levski Sofia	22	9	8	5	37	16	+21	26	
4	Akademik Sofia	22	10	6	6	40	33	+7	26	
5	Spartak Varna	22	10	5	7	40	27	+13	25	
6	Cerveno Zname Sofia (R)	22	6	11	5	26	21	+5	23	Relegation to 1952 B Group
7	Lokomotiv Plovdiv	22	7	9	6	21	20	+1	23	
8	Stroitel Sofia (R)	22	8	6	8	25	24	+1	22	Relegation to 1952 B Group
9	Minyor Pernik	22	9	2	11	37	36	+1	20	
10	Botev Plovdiv	22	6	5	11	26	32	−6	17	
11	Spartak Pleven (R)	22	1	3	18	16	59	−43	5	Relegation to 1952 B Group
12	Dunav Ruse (R)	22	0	4	18	8	83	−75	4	Relegation to 1952 B Group

Source: rsssf.com
(C) Champions; (R) Relegated

== Results ==
Home \ Away	AKD	BPD	CHZ	CSK	DUN	LEV	LPL	MIN	SPL	SSF	SPV	STR
Akademik Sofia		5–2	1–1	1–3	4–1	3–3	0–0	4–1	2–0	0–0	2–0	3–1
Botev Plovdiv	0–1		1–0	0–2	4–1	0–1	0–3	1–4	6–0	1–1	0–1	1–1
Cerveno Zname Sofia	2–0	1–1		0–2	3–0	1–1	0–0	0–0	7–1	0–0	2–2	2–0
CSKA Sofia	2–0	0–0	5–0		12–0	2–1	1–0	3–0	5–5	0–1	1–0	2–0
Dunav Ruse	0–2	1–1	1–2	0–6		0–5	0–0	0–3	1–1	0–0	0–5	1–3
Levski Sofia	1–1	4–0	1–1	2–0	6–0		1–1	0–1	2–0	1–3	2–0	1–1
Lokomotiv Plovdiv	2–1	1–2	0–0	0–5	3–0	1–0		3–2	1–0	0–0	2–1	1–1
Minyor Pernik	1–3	1–2	2–2	0–2	5–0	1–0	3–2		1–0	1–3	0–1	1–2
Spartak Pleven	3–3	0–3	0–1	0–5	5–1	0–1	1–1	0–6		1–2	2–3	1–2
Spartak Sofia	3–0	1–0	1–0	1–0	1–0	0–0	1–0	3–1	2–0		1–0	2–1
Spartak Varna	7–2	2–1	1–1	0–3	6–1	0–4	0–0	4–0	3–0	1–1		3–2
Stroitel Sofia	0–2	1–0	1–0	0–1	6–0	0–0	1–0	1–3	1–0	0–0	0–0	

Source: A PFG (in Bulgarian)
Legend: Blue = home team win; Yellow = draw; Red = away team win.

== Top scorers ==
Rank	Scorer	Club	Goals
1	(Bulgaria) Dimitar Milanov	CSKA Sofia	13
2	(Bulgaria) Dimitar Andonov	Spartak Sofia	8
2	(Bulgaria) Mihail Yankov	CSKA Sofia	8
2	(Bulgaria) Arsen Dimitrov	Levski Sofia	8
2	(Bulgaria) Nikolay Milkov	Lokomotiv Plovdiv	8

== Champions ==
CSKA Sofia

Goalkeepers
(Bulgaria) Georgi Kekemanov	14	(0)
(Bulgaria) Stefan Gerenski	8	(0)

Defenders
(Bulgaria) Georgi Rusev	9	(1)
(Bulgaria) Manol Manolov	17	(0)
(Bulgaria) Georgi Enisheynov	3	(0)
(Bulgaria) Georgi Tsvetkov	20	(0)
(Bulgaria) Georgi Nasev	19	(0)

Midfielders
(Bulgaria) Gavril Stoyanov	11	(0)
(Bulgaria) Stefan Bozhkov	17	(2)
(Bulgaria) Panayot Panayotov	17	(1)
(Bulgaria) Atanas Tsanov	12	(3)
(Bulgaria) Gancho Vasilev	11	(2)

Forwards
(Bulgaria) Krum Yanev	11	(2)
(Bulgaria) Dimitar Milanov	22	(13)
(Bulgaria) Stefan Stefanov	20	(13)
(Bulgaria) Mihail Yankov	14	(8)
(Bulgaria) Angel Milanov	14	(6)

Manager
(Bulgaria) Krum Milev
