= Bozhin Laskov =

Personal information
- Full name: Bozhin Georgiev Laskov
- Date of birth: 15 February 1922
- Place of birth: Lokorsko, Kingdom of Bulgaria
- Date of death: 31 March 2007 (aged 85)
- Place of death: Bratislava, Slovakia
- Position: Striker

Youth career
- Levski Sofia

Senior career*
Years	Team	Apps	(Gls)
1941–1946	Levski Sofia	56	(40)
1946–1947	Zbrojovka Brno		
1947–1952	ŠK Bratislava	98	(48)
1953–1956	ČH Bratislava		
- TTS Trenčín

International career
1946–1949	Bulgaria	6	(2)
1953	Czechoslovakia	3	(0)

Managerial career
- ČH Bratislava
- 1961: Spartak Trnava
- TTS Trenčín
- * Club domestic league appearances and goals

Bozhin Georgiev Laskov (Bulgarian: Божин Георгиев Ласков; (15 February 1922 – 31 March 2007) was a naturalised Slovak association football player of Bulgarian descent and origin, who played as a striker, noted for his tall stature, impressive physique and great heading. In addition, post-retirement Laskov served as a otorhinolaryngologist and a trained Bulgarian Orthodox priest. After 1946, he lived and worked in Czechoslovakia and is counted among Bulgaria's and Slovakia's best footballers of the era.

== Biography ==
Laskov was born in the village of Lokorsko, today administratively part of Sofia. He graduated from the Sofia Seminary, from where his nickname Popeto (Попето; "the little priest") stems. His youth team was FC Pobeda from the Sofia neighbourhood of Orlandovtsi, for which he played in 1939–1940. In 1940, Laskov moved to PFC Levski Sofia and featured for their senior team between 1941 and 1946 as their number 9 striker. Laskov appeared in 56 Bulgarian Championship matches, scoring the remarkable 40 goals. In 46 Bulgarian Cup matches, he scored 21 times; he also appeared in 9 international games, scoring 5 goals, as well as 35 other games with 24 goals on his name. During his stay with Levski, Laskov won the Bulgarian Championship twice (in 1942 and 1946), the Bulgarian Cup three times (in 1942, 1946 and 1947) and the Sofia Championship four times (in 1942, 1943, 1945 and 1946). For the Bulgaria national football team, his tally stands at 8 matches and 2 goals. At the 1946 Balkan Cup in Tirana, Albania, he was proclaimed the best footballer of the Balkans. Reportedly, France Football also deemed him the best footballer in Europe later on.

On 15 February 1946, Laskov immigrated to Brno, Czechoslovakia, where he studied medicine at the Masaryk University and played for SK Židenice, the modern 1. FC Brno. In 1947, he moved to Bratislava, where he married a Slovak beautician and was granted Czechoslovak citizenship. In Bratislava, he played for ŠK Slovan Bratislava between 1947 and 1952, winning the Czechoslovak First League in 1949, 1950 and 1951. In Czechoslovakia, he has also played for FK Inter Bratislava (then Červená Hviezda) and TTS Trenčín, until 1960. In the Czechoslovak Championship, he played a total of 169 games, of which 98 (with 48 league goals) for Slovan; he also featured in 3 games for the Czechoslovakia national football team. He was awarded several fair play prizes in Czechoslovakia. Later on, he worked as a manager, managing FK Inter Bratislava, FC Spartak Trnava and Trenčín. He also served as a professional physician specialized in otolaryngology and was an active member of the Bulgarian association in Slovakia.

Laskov died in Bratislava on 31 March 2007.

== Honours ==
Levski Sofia

- Bulgarian champion – 1942, 1946, 1947
- Bulgarian Cup – 1942, 1946, 1947
- Sofia Championship – 1942, 1943, 1945, 1946

Individual

- France Football Best player of Europe – 1949
- Best player of the Balkans – 1946

SK Slovan Bratislava

- Czechoslovak champion – 1949, 1950, 1951

Bulgaria

- 1946 Balkan Cup – Fourth place
- 1947 Balkan Cup – Fourth place
