= 1953 PFC Cherno More Varna season =

Cherno More Varna
1953 season
- Manager: Ivan Mokanov
- Republican Football Group A: 3rd
- Bulgarian Cup: Quarterfinals
- Top goalscorer: Vasil Dosev (7)

The 1953 season was Cherno More's second consecutive season in Republican Football Group A after being administratively relegated in 1949 and returning to the top flight in 1952. The club competed as VMS Stalin after Varna was renamed after the Soviet dictator in December 1949. Cherno more finished in 3rd place which was the club's highest post-war league finish until it was matched in 2008-2009.

== Republican Football Group A ==
=== Matches ===
15 March 1953 Round 1	VMS Stalin	0–1	Akademik Stalin	Varna

22 March 1953 Round 2	Minyor Dimitrovo	3–2	VMS Stalin	Pernik

28 March 1953 Round 3	VMS Stalin	2–1	Lokomotiv Sofia	Varna

1 April 1953 Round 4	Lokomotiv Plovdiv	0–0	VMS Stalin	Plovdiv

12 April 1953 Round 5	VMS Stalin	3–2	VVS Sofia	Varna

25 April 1953 Round 7	VMS Stalin	3–2	Cherveno Zname Stanke Dimitrov	Varna

5 May 1953 Round 8	Spartak Sofia	1–0	VMS Stalin	Sofia

11 May 1953 Round 9	VMS Stalin	0–0	Spartak Plovdiv	Varna

17 May 1953 Round 10	Spartak Pleven	1–0	VMS Stalin	Pleven

23 May 1953 Round 11	VMS Stalin	1–0	Stroitel Sofia	Varna

31 May 1953 Round 12	VMS Stalin	2–0	DNA Plovdiv	Varna

7 July 1953 Round 13	Udarnik Sofia	0–2	VMS Stalin	Sofia

10 July 1953 Round 15	Dinamo Sofia	1–0	VMS Stalin	Sofia

19 July 1953 Round 14	VMS Stalin	1–0	Sofiyski Garnizon	Varna

29 July 1953 Round 16	Akademik Stalin	1–0	VMS Stalin	Varna

10 August 1953 Round 29	Sofiyski Garnizon	0–0	VMS Stalin	Sofia

15 August 1953 Round 20	VVS Sofia	2–1	VMS Stalin	Sofia

18 August 1953 Round 21	Cherveno Zname Stanke Dimitrov	0–0	VMS Stalin	Dupnitsa

22 August 1953 Round 24	Spartak Plovdiv	0–3	VMS Stalin	Plovdiv

26 August 1953 Round 27	DNA Plovdiv	1–1	VMS Stalin	Plovdiv

7 September 1953 Round 23	VMS Stalin	1–2	Spartak Sofia	Varna

11 September 1953 Round 28	VMS Stalin	3–0	Udarnik Sofia	Varna

17 September 1953 Round 26	Stroitel Sofia	0–1	VMS Stalin	Sofia

23 September 1953 Round 25	VMS Stalin	2–0	Spartak Pleven	Varna

27 September 1953 Round 19	VMS Stalin	0–0	Lokomotiv Plovdiv	Varna

6 October 1953 Round 17	VMS Stalin	1–0	Minyor Dimitrovo	Varna

13 October 1953 Round 18	Lokomotiv Sofia	2–0	VMS Stalin	Sofia

20 October 1953 Round 30	VMS Stalin	0–0	Dinamo Sofia	Varna

- Varna was renamed Stalin after Soviet dictator Joseph Stalin from 20 December 1949 to 20 October 1956;
- Pernik was renamed Dimitrovo after Bulgarian Communist leader Georgi Dimitrov from 1949 to 1962;
- Dupnitsa was renamed Stanke Dimitrov in 1950 after the Communist party activist. Cherveno zname is a former name of Marek;
- CSKA Sofia participated as Sofiyski Garnizon (Sofia Garrison);
- Dinamo Sofia is a former name of Levski Sofia;
- Udarnik Sofia is a former name of Slavia Sofia;
- DNA Plovdiv is a former name of Botev Plovdiv.
- A unified team composed of players from various teams took part in the league until July 1953 in order to help the national team prepare for the 1954 FIFA World Cup qualification campaign. The idea was abandoned after the national team's defeat against Romania on 28 June 1953. The team's participation meant the fixtures were subject to heavy rescheduling, which was later recognized as a mistake by the Football Union.

=== League standings ===
Pos	Team	Pld	W	D	L	GF	GA	GD	Pts
1	Levski Sofia (C)	28	19	5	4	48	22	+26	43
2	CSKA Sofia	28	18	6	4	64	23	+41	42
3	Cherno More Varna	28	12	7	9	29	20	+9	31
4	Lokomotiv Plovdiv	28	9	13	6	30	29	+1	31
5	Slavia Sofia	28	9	12	7	42	33	+9	30

Source: rsssf.com
(C) Champions

=== Results summary ===
Overall								Home						Away					
Pld	W	D	L	GF	GA	GD	Pts	W	D	L	GF	GA	GD	W	D	L	GF	GA	GD
28	12	7	9	29	20	+9	43	9	3	2	19	8	+11	3	4	7	10	12	−2

== Bulgarian Cup ==
Round 1	VMS Stalin	2–1	Akademik Stalin	Varna

Round 2	VMS Stalin	1–1 (a.e.t.)	Etar Veliko Tarnovo

Round 2 replay	VMS Stalin	3–0	Etar Veliko Tarnovo

Quarterfinals	VMS Stalin	0–1	Spartak Plovdiv

== Squad ==
Pos.	Nat.	Name
GK	BUL	Ivan Derventski
GK	BUL	Lyuben Tashev
DF	BUL	Dimitar Stefanov
DF	BUL	Gocho Rusev
DF	BUL	Todor Nikolov
DF	BUL	Blagoy Filipov
MF	BUL	Nikola Popov
MF	BUL	Ivan Shulev
MF	BUL	Nikola Aleksiev
MF	BUL	Ivan Pirgov
FW	BUL	Spas Kirov
FW	BUL	Vasil Dosev
FW	BUL	Borislav Kovachev
FW	BUL	Kiril Bogdanov
FW	BUL	Dimitar Yovchev
FW	BUL	Todor Terzistoev
FW	BUL	Dimitar Samsarov
FW	BUL	Georgi Dimitrov
