= 1948–49 A Group =

5th season of top-tier football league in Bulgaria

A Group
- Season: 1948–49
- Champions: Levski Sofia (6th title)
- Relegated: Bdin; Chernomorets
- Matches played: 90
- Goals scored: 239 (2.66 per match)
- Top goalscorer: Nedko Nedev; Dimitar Milanov; (11 goals each)

The 1948–49 A Group was the inaugural season of the A Football Group, the top Bulgarian professional league for association football clubs.

== Overview ==
It was contested by 10 teams, and Levski Sofia won the championship undefeated.

=== Teams ===
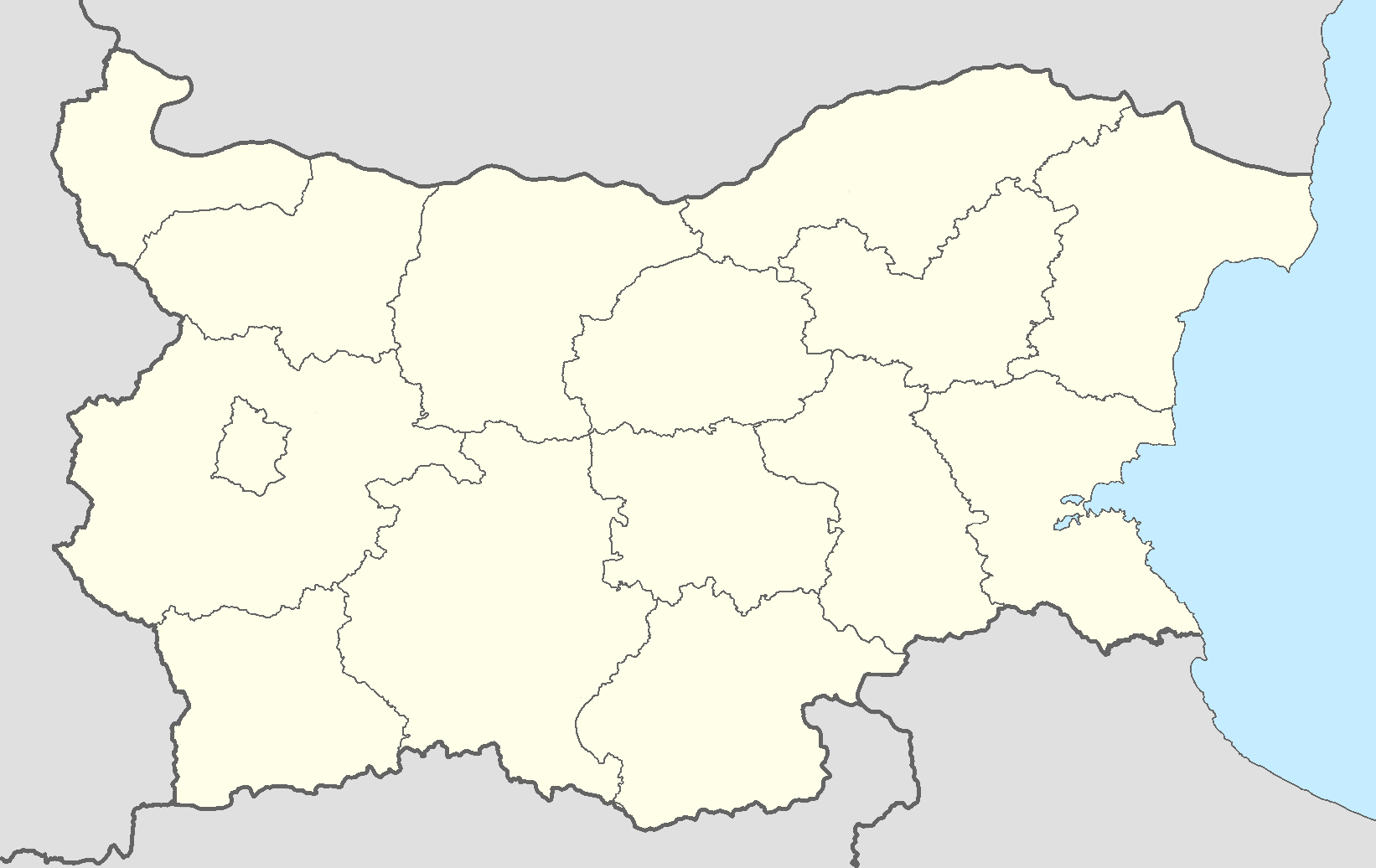
Location of teams in the 1948-49 A Group

== League standings ==
Pos	Team	Pld	W	D	L	GF	GA	GD	Pts	Relegation
1	Levski Sofia (C)	18	15	3	0	44	8	+36	33	
2	CSKA Sofia	18	10	4	4	28	15	+13	24	
3	Lokomotiv Sofia	18	8	5	5	25	17	+8	21	
4	Slavia Sofia	18	9	3	6	29	20	+9	21	
5	Spartak Sofia	18	8	5	5	23	18	+5	21	
6	Cherno More Varna	18	9	3	6	30	25	+5	21	
7	Slavia Plovdiv	18	4	8	6	16	21	−5	16	
8	Marek Dupnitsa	18	2	4	12	16	42	−26	8	
9	Bdin Vidin (R)	18	2	4	12	13	35	−22	8	Relegation to 1950 B Group
10	Chernomorets Burgas (R)	18	2	3	13	15	38	−23	7	Relegation to 1950 B Group

Source: rsssf.com
(C) Champions; (R) Relegated

== Results ==
Home \ Away	BDI	CHM	CHB	CSK	LEV	LSO	MAR	SLA	SLP	SSF
Bdin Vidin		2–2	1–0	0–2	0–3	2–2	4–0	0–1	1–1	0–3
Cherno More	2–1		2–1	2–0	2–3	1–0	3–2	1–0	0–1	3–1
Chernomorets Burgas	2–1	2–4		1–2	0–1	0–2	2–1	2–3	1–1	1–1
CSKA Sofia	4–0	3–1	2–0		0–0	3–2	0–0	1–4	5–0	0–1
Levski Sofia	5–0	4–2	5–1	1–0		4–0	6–0	1–0	1–0	1–1
Lokomotiv Sofia	2–0	1–0	1–1	2–2	0–1		4–0	2–0	0–0	1–0
Marek Dupnitsa	1–0	1–1	2–0	0–1	1–3	0–3		0–3	2–2	0–2
Slavia Sofia	4–1	1–3	3–0	0–1	1–1	2–3	4–3		1–0	1–1
Slavia Plovdiv	0–0	1–1	3–0	0–1	0–1	1–0	2–2	0–0		2–0
Spartak Sofia	1–0	1–0	3–1	1–1	0–3	0–0	2–1	0–1	5–2	

Source: A PFG (in Bulgarian)
Legend: Blue = home team win; Yellow = draw; Red = away team win.

== Champions ==
Levski Sofia

Coach Rezső Somlai

Goalkeepers
(Bulgaria) Spas Andreev	12	(0)
(Bulgaria) Apostol Sokolov	5	(0)
(Bulgaria) Stoyan Tashev	1	(0)

Defenders
(Bulgaria) Dimitar Mihaylov	2	(0)
(Bulgaria) Atanas Dinev	11	(0)
(Italy) Amedeo Kleva	9	(0)
(Bulgaria) Ivan Dimchev	15	(0)
(Bulgaria) Stefan Metodiev	17	(0)

Midfielders
(Bulgaria) Angel Petrov	10	(3)
(Bulgaria) Atanas Tsanov	6	(0)
(Bulgaria) Dimitar Doychinov	7	(1)
(Bulgaria) Kostadin Blagoev	7	(0)
(Bulgaria) Petar Moskov	1	(0)
(Bulgaria) Dragan Georgiev	10	(1)
(Bulgaria) Lyubomir Hranov	8	(5)

Forwards
(Bulgaria) Borislav Tsvetkov	18	(6)
(Bulgaria) Arsen Dimitrov	7	(7)
(Bulgaria) Yordan Tomov	16	(2)
(Bulgaria) Georgi Pachedzhiev	13	(1)
(Bulgaria) Georgi Kardashev	10	(9)
(Bulgaria) Vasil Spasov	13	(8)

== Top scorers ==
Rank	Scorer	Club	Goals
1	(Bulgaria) Nedko Nedev	Cherno More Varna	11
1	(Bulgaria) Dimitar Milanov	CSKA Sofia	11
3	(Bulgaria) Georgi Kardashev	Levski Sofia	9
4	(Bulgaria) Petar Argirov	Lokomotiv Sofia	8
4	(Bulgaria) Vasil Spasov	Levski Sofia	8
4	(Bulgaria) Georgi Stoychev	Slavia Sofia	8

- Source:1948–49 Top Goalscorers
