= Yordan Tomov =

Bulgarian footballer and coach

Personal information
- Date of birth: 8 January 1924
- Place of birth: Sofia, Bulgaria
- Date of death: 10 March 1998 (aged 74)
- Place of death: Sofia, Bulgaria
- Position: Left winger

Senior career*
| Years | Team | Apps | (Gls) |
| 1940–1941 | Botev Sofia | 10 | (2) |
| 1942–1944 | FC 13 Sofia | 34 | (11) |
| 1945–1946 | Septemvri Sofia | 15 | (6) |
| 1947–1953 | Levski Sofia | 112 | (34) |
- * Club domestic league appearances and goals

Yordan Tomov (Bulgarian: Йордан Томов; 8 January 1924 – 10 March 1998) was a Bulgarian footballer and coach. He usually played the position of left winger.

== Honours ==
=== Club ===
Levski Sofia

- Republic Championship (1): 1947
- A Group (3): 1948–49, 1950, 1953
- Bulgarian Cup (3): 1947, 1949, 1950
