= 1953 A Group =

9th season of top-tier football league in Bulgaria

A Group
- Season: 1953
- Champions: Levski Sofia (8th title)
- Matches played: 223
- Goals scored: 484 (2.17 per match)
- Top goalscorer: Dimitar Minchev (15 goals)

The 1953 A Group was the fifth season of the A Football Group, the top Bulgarian professional league for association football clubs, since its establishment in 1948.

== Overview ==
It was contested by 16 teams, and Levski Sofia won the championship.

== League standings ==
Pos	Team	Pld	W	D	L	GF	GA	GD	Pts	Relegation
1	Levski Sofia (C)	28	19	5	4	48	22	+26	43	
2	CSKA Sofia	28	18	6	4	64	23	+41	42	
3	Cherno More Varna	28	12	7	9	29	20	+9	31	
4	Lokomotiv Plovdiv	28	9	13	6	30	29	+1	31	
5	Slavia Sofia	28	9	12	7	42	33	+9	30	
6	Spartak Pleven	28	9	12	7	29	29	0	30	
7	Lokomotiv Sofia	28	10	9	9	30	32	−2	29	
8	Minyor Pernik	28	11	6	11	33	35	−2	28	
9	Spartak Plovdiv	28	9	9	10	29	29	0	27	
10	Akademik Varna (R)	28	9	7	12	26	43	−17	25	Relegation to 1954 B Group
11	Botev Plovdiv (R)	28	8	8	12	29	31	−2	24	Relegation to 1954 B Group
12	Spartak Sofia (R)	28	5	14	9	24	34	−10	24	Relegation to 1954 B Group
13	Stroitel Sofia (R)	28	5	12	11	22	29	−7	22	Relegation to 1954 B Group
14	VVS Sofia (R)	28	6	9	13	26	35	−9	21	Relegation to 1954 B Group
15	Marek Dupnitsa (R)	28	3	7	18	23	60	−37	13	Relegation to 1954 B Group
–	Unified team of VSO (Note: "Unified team of volunteer's sport organisations" is the name of the national football team of Bulgaria which participated in the league) (R)	13	11	0	2	37	8	+29	0 (Note: Results annulled)	Relegation to 1954 B Group

Source: rsssf.com
(C) Champions; (R) Relegated

== Results ==
Home \ Away	AVA	BPD	CHM	CSK	LEV	LPL	LSO	MAR	MIN	SLA	SPL	SPD	SSF	STR	VVS
Akademik Varna		0–1	1–0	0–1	0–4	2–2	0–2	3–0 (Note: Marek Dupnitsa was excluded after spectator riots in the match against Minyor Pernik. The remaining eight matches were rated 0–3 for the opponents.)	3–2	2–0	0–0	2–1	3–1	0–0	1–0
Botev Plovdiv	1–1		1–1	0–3	0–1	0–1	0–1	3–0	1–2	2–2	4–0	0–0	0–0	2–2	3–0
Cherno More	0–1	2–0		1–0	0–0	0–0	2–1	3–2	1–0	3–0	2–0	0–0	1–2	1–0	3–2
CSKA Sofia	7–0	2–0	0–0		0–1	5–0	3–1	3–0	1–1	2–2	2–0	2–1	7–1	2–2	1–0
Levski Sofia	4–1	0–1	1–0	0–5		5–0	2–1	2–0	1–0	1–1	3–0	2–1	0–0	1–0	1–0
Lokomotiv Plovdiv	0–0	2–0	0–0	0–1	0–2		0–0	4–3	2–0	1–1	2–0	1–0	1–0	0–0	0–0
Lokomotiv Sofia	3–1	0–1	2–0	0–4	0–3	2–2		3–0	0–1	0–5	1–1	3–0	1–0	1–1	1–1
Marek Dupnitsa	2–2	1–0	0–0	1–2	0–3	0–3	1–1		1–2	0–3	2–2	4–1	0–0	1–0	1–3
Minyor Pernik	2–0	1–4	3–2	1–3	1–2	1–1	0–1	4–1		2–3	0–0	1–1	0–0	1–0	1–0
Slavia Sofia	1–1	5–2	0–2	1–2	1–2	1–1	1–2	1–1	0–3		2–1	0–0	4–1	1–1	2–0
Spartak Pleven	3–0	0–0	1–0	3–1	1–1	1–0	0–0	4–2	0–0	0–0		1–1	2–0	3–0	1–0
Spartak Plovdiv	1–0	2–1	0–3	0–1	3–0	1–1	1–0	4–0	1–2	1–1	1–1		1–0	3–0	2–1
Spartak Sofia	1–0	1–2	1–0	2–2	1–1	3–3	0–0	3–0	2–0	0–0	2–3	1–1		0–0	1–1
Stroitel Sofia	3–0	1–0	0–1	2–2	3–2	1–0	0–1	0–0	1–2	0–1	2–0	0–1	1–1		0–0
VVS Sofia	1–2	0–0	2–1	3–0	2–3	0–3	2–2	1–0	3–0	0–3	1–1	1–0	0–0	2–2	

Source: A PFG (in Bulgarian)
Legend: Blue = home team win; Yellow = draw; Red = away team win.

== Champions ==
Levski Sofia

Goalkeepers
(Bulgaria) Simeon Kostov	19	(0)
(Bulgaria) Dimitar Elenkov	8	(0)

Defenders
(Bulgaria) Metodi Angelovski	20	(0)
(Bulgaria) Dimitar Dimitrov	1	(0)
(Bulgaria) Dimitar Iliev	19	(0)
(Italy) Amedeo Kleva	24	(0)
(Bulgaria) Dimitar Doychinov	8	(0)
(Bulgaria) Ivan Dimchev	23	(0)

Midfielders
(Bulgaria) Dragan Georgiev	11	(1)
(Bulgaria) Aleksandar Krastev	17	(0)
(Bulgaria) Lyubomir Hranov	17	(3)
(Bulgaria) Aleksandar Bahchevandzhiev	1	(0)
(Bulgaria) Dimitar Kontev	2	(0)
(Bulgaria) Ivan Georgiev	14	(1)
(Bulgaria) Stefan Abadzhiev	14	(5)

Forwards
(Bulgaria) Dimitar Andonov	21	(12)
(Bulgaria) Arsen Dimitrov	4	(1)
(Bulgaria) Vasil Spasov	24	(10)
(Bulgaria) Todor Stoyanov	4	(0)
(Bulgaria) Todor Takev	25	(6)
(Bulgaria) Dimitar Popdimitrov	1	(0)
(Bulgaria) Georgi Kardashev	6	(1)
(Bulgaria) Yordan Tomov	20	(4)

Manager
(Bulgaria) Dimitar Mutafchiev

== Top scorers ==
Rank	Scorer	Club	Goals
1	(Bulgaria) Dimitar Minchev	Spartak Pleven; VVS Sofia	15
2	(Bulgaria) Dimitar Andonov	Levski Sofia	12
3	(Bulgaria) Kiril Nikolov	Marek Dupnitsa	11
4	(Bulgaria) Vasil Spasov	Levski Sofia	10
