= Rezső Somlai =

Hungarian footballer (1911–1983)

Personal information
- Full name: Rezső Somlai-Stolzparth
- Date of birth: 22 May 1911
- Place of birth: Budapest, Austria-Hungary
- Date of death: 19 October 1983 (aged 72)
- Position: Midfielder

Senior career*
| Years | Team | Apps | (Gls) |
- Ferencváros (amateur)
| 1932–1934 | Nice | | |
| 1934–1935 | Kispesti FC | 33 | (1) |
| 1935–1936 | Olympique Alès | | |
| 1936–1937 | Red Star Saint-Ouen | | |
| 1938–1939 | Kispesti FC | 4 | (0) |
| 1941–1942 | Ujvideki AC | 4 | (1) |

International career
| 1934 | Hungary (Called-up) | | |

Managerial career
- 1947: Bulgaria
- 1948–1949: Levski Sofia
- 1967–1969: Daugava Rīga
- * Club domestic league appearances and goals

Rezső Somlai-Stolzparth (22 May 1911 – 19 October 1983) was a Hungarian footballer, who was in Hungary squad at the 1934 FIFA World Cup.

He played as a midfielder for Ferencváros, Nice, Kispesti FC, Olympique Alès, Red Star and Ujvideki AC.

He managed Bulgaria and Levski Sofia. As coach of Levski, he won a double by winning the Bulgarian championship in 1949 and the Bulgarian Cup in the same 1949 year, finished the 1948–49 season unbeaten in both competitions as well.

== Sources ==
- Barreaud, Marc (1998). Dictionnaire des footballeurs étrangers du championnat professionnel français (1932–1997). L'Harmattan, Paris. ISBN 2-7384-6608-7.
