= Amedeo Kleva =

Italian-Bulgarian footballer (1923-1996)

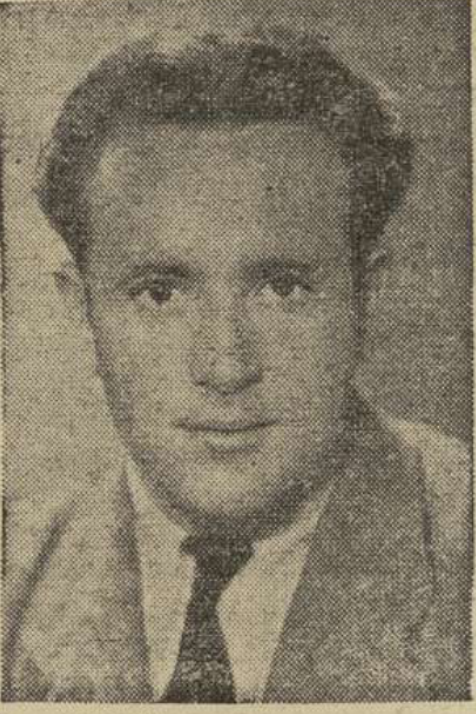

Personal information
- Date of birth: 6 February 1923
- Place of birth: Pleven, Bulgaria
- Date of death: 22 June 1996 (aged 73)
- Place of death: Italy
- Position: Defender

Senior career*
Years	Team	Apps	(Gls)
1940–1942	Pobeda Sofia		
1942–1953	Levski Sofia	142	(0)

International career
1948–1950	Bulgaria	2	(0)
- * Club domestic league appearances and goals

Amedeo Kleva (6 February 1923 – 22 June 1996) was a Bulgarian-born Italian footballer who played as a defender. He spent his career in Bulgaria and earned two caps for the Bulgarian national team. At club level, Kleva won three A Group titles and two Bulgarian Cups with Levski Sofia.

== Honours ==
=== Club ===
Levski Sofia

- A Group (3): 1948–49, 1950, 1953
- Bulgarian Cup (2): 1949, 1950
