= FC Chernolomets Popovo =

Bulgarian football club

FC Chernolomets
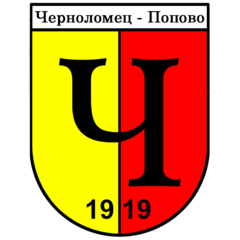
- Full name: FC Chernolomets 1919 Popovo
- Founded: 1919; 107 years ago
- Ground: Stamo Kostov Stadium, Popovo
- Capacity: 4,500
- Manager: Iliyan Pamukov
- League: North-East Third League
- 2022–23: North-East Third League, 2nd
- Website: https://chernolomets1919.com/
Home colours	Away colours

FC Chernolomets (Bulgarian: ФК Черноломец) is a Bulgarian football club based in Popovo, that competes in the North-East Third League, the third tier of Bulgarian football.

The club was founded in 1919. In 1946, they contested the Bulgarian Cup Final for the only time in their history, losing 4–1 to Levski Sofia.

== Honours ==
Bulgarian Cup

- Runners-up: 1946

== Current squad ==
As of 1 February 2023 Note: Flags indicate national team as defined under FIFA eligibility rules; some limited exceptions apply. Players may hold more than one non-FIFA nationality.

No.	Pos.	Nation	Player
1	GK	BUL	Tsvetelin Enchev
5	DF	BUL	Aleksandar Nedev
9	FW	BUL	Tihomir Kanev
10	MF	BUL	Desislav Petkov
11	MF	BUL	Beadir Beadirov (captain)
15	MF	BUL	Boyan Dimov
16	DF	BUL	Martin Kovachev
17	DF	BUL	Svetoslav Slavchev
25	MF	BUL	Yavor Todorov
30	DF	BUL	Deyan Dimitrov

No.	Pos.	Nation	Player
33	MF	BUL	Ozan Remzi
88	MF	BUL	Simeon Savov
92	MF	BUL	Dimitar Pantev
—	DF	BUL	Martin Ivanov
—	MF	BUL	Dani Bonev
—	MF	BUL	Dinko Dermendzhiev
—	MF	BUL	Ivan Tsonev
—	MF	BUL	Radoslav Kovachev
—	FW	BUL	Zhechko Yordanov
—	FW	BUL	Zlatin Boyanov
