= Stefan Getsov =

Bulgarian footballer (1929–2020)

Personal information
- Full name: Stefan Getsov
- Date of birth: 27 December 1929
- Place of birth: Ruse, Bulgaria
- Date of death: 8 August 2020 (aged 90)
- Place of death: Sofia, Bulgaria
- Position: Forward

Youth career
- –1948: Slavia Sofia

Senior career*
Years	Team	Apps	(Gls)
1948–1950	Slavia Sofia		
1950–195?	Akademik Sofia		
1954	Dinamo Sofia	6	(0)
- Spartak Sofia
- SK Nikola Petrov

International career
1950	Bulgaria	1	(0)
- * Club domestic league appearances and goals

Stefan Getsov (Bulgarian: Стефан Гецов; 27 December 1929 – 8 August 2020), nicknamed Tseko (Bulgarian: Цеко), was a Bulgarian footballer who played as a forward and made one appearance for the Bulgaria national team.

== Career ==
Getsov earned his first and only cap for Bulgaria on 30 October 1950 in a friendly match against Poland, which finished as a 0–1 loss in Sofia.

== Personal life ==
Getsov died on 8 August 2020 at the age of 90.

== Career statistics ==
=== International ===
Bulgaria
Year	Apps	Goals
1950	1	0
Total	1	0
