= 1947 Bulgarian Cup =

Tournament details
- Country: Bulgaria

Final positions
- Champions: Levski Sofia (3rd cup)
- Runners-up: Botev Plovdiv

The 1947 Bulgarian Cup was the 7th season of the Bulgarian Cup (in this period the tournament was named Cup of the Soviet Army). In the tournament entered the 10 winners of regional cup competitions. Levski Sofia won the competition, beating Botev Plovdiv 1–0 in the final at the Yunak Stadium in Sofia.

== First round ==
Team 1	Score	Team 2
Zagorets Nova Zagora	1–2	Chernomorets Burgas
Marek Dupnitsa	1–1 (a.e.t.)	Levski Sofia
Replay
Marek Dupnitsa	1–3 (a.e.t.)	Levski Sofia

== Quarter-finals ==
Team 1	Score	Team 2
Montana	1–2	Lokomotiv GO
Chernomorets Burgas	0–1 (a.e.t.)	Botev Plovdiv
Pirin Blagoevgrad	1–6	Levski Sofia
Rusenets Ruse	0–3	Dobrudzha Dobrich

== Semi-finals ==
Team 1	Agg.	Team 2	1st leg	2nd leg
Dobrudzha Dobrich	2–4	Botev Plovdiv	2–2	0–2
Levski Sofia	7–2	Lokomotiv GO	5–0	2–2

== Final ==
=== Details ===
1 June 1947

Levski Sofia	1−0	Botev Plovdiv
Spasov 37' (pen.)

Yunak Stadium, Sofia
Attendance: 17,000
Referee: Todor Stoyanov (Sofia)

Levski	Botev
