= Videnov =

Videnov is a Bulgarian surname. Notable people with the surname include:

- Filip Videnov (born 1980), Bulgarian basketball player
- Zhan Videnov (born 1959), Bulgarian politician
- Zhivko Videnov (born 1977), Bulgarian hurdler
