= 1946 Bulgarian Cup =

Tournament details
- Country: Bulgaria

Final positions
- Champions: Levski Sofia (2nd cup)
- Runners-up: Chernolomets Popovo

Tournament statistics
- Top goal scorer(s): B. Laskov (Levski) (7 goals)

The 1946 Bulgarian Cup was the 6th season of the Bulgarian Cup (in this period the tournament was named Cup of the Soviet Army). Levski Sofia won the competition, beating Chernolomets Popovo 4–1 in the final at the Yunak Stadium in Sofia.

== First round ==
Team 1	Score	Team 2
Zavod G. Dimitrov Sliven	0–3	Chernomorets Burgas
Chernolomets Popovo	3–0	Yantra Gabrovo
Lokomotiv Plovdiv	8–1	Pirin Blagoevgrad
Belite orli Pleven	4–2	Etar Veliko Tarnovo
Lokomotiv Ruse	4–2	Dorostol Silistra
Bdin Vidin	3–0	Lokomotiv Mezdra
Dobrudzha Dobrich	1–0	Cherno More Varna
Levski Sofia	7–0	Hebros Harmanli

== Quarter-finals ==
Team 1	Score	Team 2
Chernolomets Popovo	3–1	Belite orli Pleven
Lokomotiv Plovdiv	2–0	Chernomorets Burgas
Bdin Vidin	0–1	Levski Sofia
Dobrudzha Dobrich	1–1 (a.e.t.)	Lokomotiv Ruse
Replay
Dobrudzha Dobrich	0–1	Lokomotiv Ruse

== Semi-finals ==
Team 1	Score	Team 2
Lokomotiv Plovdiv	0–3	Levski Sofia
Chernolomets Popovo	1–1 (a.e.t.)	Lokomotiv Ruse
Replay
Chernolomets Popovo	3–2	Lokomotiv Ruse

== Final ==
=== Details ===
6 May 1946
17:00 EEST

Levski Sofia	4−1	Chernolomets Popovo
Laskov 8', 31', 40'; Nikushev 80' (pen.)		St. Petrov 67'

Yunak Stadium, Sofia
Attendance: 15,000
Referee: Dimitar Topalov (Varna)

Levski	Chernolomets
