= Nedko Nedev =

Bulgarian footballer

Nedko Nedev (Bulgarian: Недко Недев; 18 October 1920 in Varna – 23 January 2001 in Varna) was a Bulgarian football player who played for Vladislav, Ticha-Vladislav, TVP 45, Botev Stalin and VMS, (1938–1952) different names for the same team which would eventually become known as Cherno More Varna in 1959.

Nedev made his debut for Vladislav Varna at the age of 17 years and 8 months in a friendly against Levski Sofia (3-1) on 12 July 1938. He started his career as an all-round player but eventually settled in centre forward position. Heavily built and two footed, he was known for the power and accuracy of his shots. Most of his goals were scored from a long range. After World War II he kept playing for the team under its yearly name changes by the communist regime. Nedko Nedev was a joint top scorer in the first post war league, 1948-49 to be known as A group. He scored 11 goals, as many as Dimitar Milanov of CDNA. Nedev played his last competitive match on 4 September 1952 for VMS against Udarnik Sofia (3-2) when he came in as a substitute in the second half. He had a short lived career as a coach for Udarnik Varna. Nedko Nedev was also a qualified dental technician and worked as such until his retirement
