= Vasil Spasov (footballer) =

Bulgarian footballer and manager

Vasil Spasov Васил Спасов
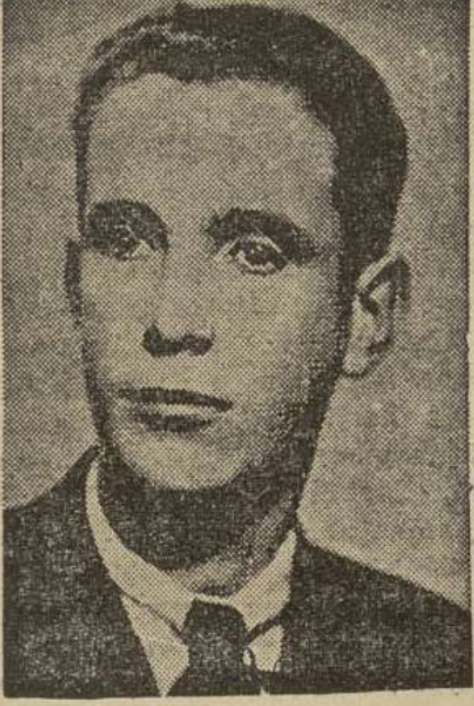

Personal information
- Date of birth: 30 December 1919
- Place of birth: Sofia, Bulgaria
- Date of death: 16 November 1996 (aged 76)
- Position: Forward

Youth career
- Bezhanets Sofia

Senior career*
Years	Team	Apps	(Gls)
1936–1940	Bezhanets Sofia		
1940–1949	Levski Sofia	113	(37)
1949–1952	Akademik Sofia	56	(21)
1953	Levski Sofia	24	(10)

International career
1943–1951	Bulgaria	17	(5)

Managerial career
- 1953–1955: Levski Sofia
- 1957–1959: Akademik Sofia
- 1959–1962: Maccabi Jaffa
- 1963–1965: Maccabi Haifa
- 1966–1967: Botev Plovdiv
- 1967–1968: Spartak Sofia
- 1969: Levski Sofia
- 1970–1972: Bulgaria
- 1972–1974: Omonia
- 1976–1977: Levski Sofia
- 1980–1982: Omonia
- 1982–1984: Cyprus
- 1989: Maccabi Jaffa
- * Club domestic league appearances and goals

Vasil Spasov (Bulgarian: Васил Спасов), nicknamed The Roller (30 December 1919 – 16 November 1996) was a Bulgarian football player and manager who played as a forward. He achieved 17 cap (sport)s for his country, scoring five goals.

While he played the majority of his career with Levski Sofia, they won five Bulgarian Championship titles and four Bulgarian cups.

== Honours ==
=== Player ===
Levski Sofia

- Bulgarian State Championship (1): 1942
- Bulgarian Republic Championship (2): 1946, 1947
- Bulgarian A Group (2): 1948–49, 1953
- Bulgarian Cup (4): 1942, 1946, 1947, 1949
- Sofia Championship (5): 1942, 1943, 1945, 1946, 1948
- Bulgarian footballer of the Year: 1948

=== Manager ===
Botev Plovdiv

- Bulgarian A Group: 1966–67

Spartak Sofia

- Bulgarian Cup: 1967–68

Omonia

- Cypriot First Division (3): 1973–74, 1980–81, 1981–82
- Cypriot Cup (3): 1974, 1981, 1982
- Cypriot Super Cup (2): 1981, 1982

Levski Sofia

- Bulgarian A Group: 1976–77
- Bulgarian Cup: 1976–77
