= 1946 Bulgarian Republic Football Championship =

2nd season of season of top-tier football league in Bulgaria

Bulgarian Republic Football Championship
- Season: 1946
- Champions: Levski Sofia

The 1946 Bulgarian Republic Football Championship was a national football competition in Bulgaria.

== Overview ==
It was contested by 16 teams, and Levski Sofia won the championship.

== First round ==
Team 1	Score	Team 2
Rodina Haskovo	1–4	Spartak Varna
TV 45 Varna	5–0	YuBS 45 Mihaylovgrad
Levski Samokov	1–1 (a.e.t.)	Hadzhi Slavchev Pavlikeni
Benkovski Vidin	5–3	Botev Plovdiv
LB 45 Burgas	2–1 (a.e.t.)	Kirkov-Yunak Lovech
Levski Sofia	7–0	Ilinden Petrich
Slavia Plovdiv	0–1	Slavia Sofia
Lokomotiv Ruse	0–4	Lokomotiv Sofia
Replay
Levski Samokov	1–5	Hadzhi Slavchev Pavlikeni

== Quarter-finals ==
Team 1	Score	Team 2
LB 45 Burgas	0–2 (a.e.t.)	Levski Sofia
Benkovski Vidin	2–1	Hadzhi Slavchev Pavlikeni
TV 45 Varna	1–2	Lokomotiv Sofia
Slavia Sofia	1–3	Spartak Varna

== Semi-finals ==
Team 1	Agg.	Team 2	1st leg	2nd leg
Levski Sofia	6–0	Spartak Varna	3–0	3–0
Benkovski Vidin	2–4	Lokomotiv Sofia	2–2	0–2

== Final ==
=== First game ===
6 September 1946

Levski Sofia	1−0	Lokomotiv Sofia
Nikushev 4'	Report

Yunak Stadium, Sofia
Attendance: 20,000

=== Second game ===
15 September 1946

Lokomotiv Sofia	0−1	Levski Sofia
	Report	Hranov 27'

Yunak Stadium, Sofia
Attendance: 25,000

Levski Sofia won 2–0 on aggregate.
