= Bulgarian Republic Football Championship =

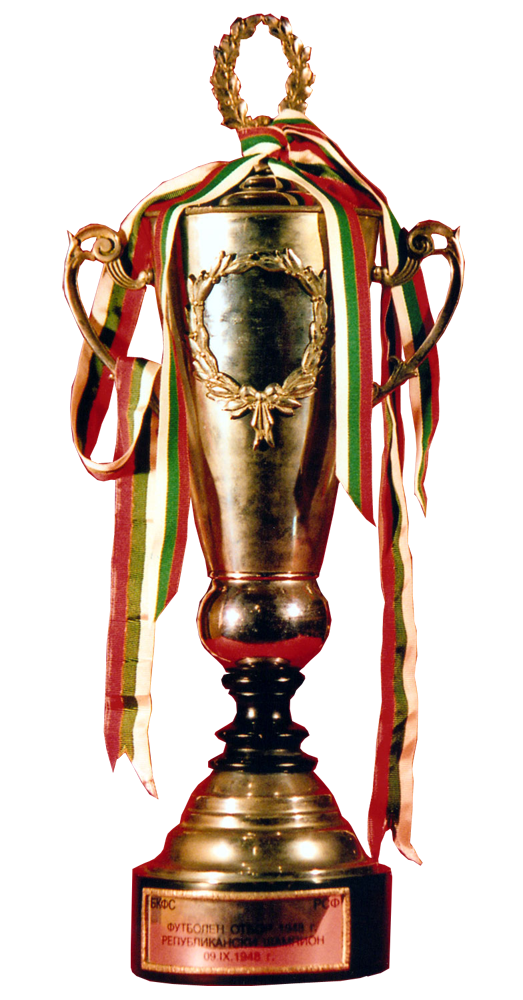
- Bulgarian Republic Football Championship trophy
- Sport: Football
- Founded: 1945
- Folded: 1948
- No. of teams: 16–24
- Country: Bulgaria
- Most titles: Levski Sofia (2 titles)
- Related competitions: State Championship; Bulgarian A Football Group

The Republic Football Championship was a national football competition in Bulgaria, successor of the State Championship. It was organised for only four years, from 1945 to 1948. After 1948 it was reorganised as a Republic Football Group.

== Format ==
The championship was a knockout tournament featuring clubs that had finished at the top of six regional divisions. These divisions were round-robin tournaments that included football clubs from different geographic areas.

Season	Champions (titles)	Runner-up
1945	Lokomotiv Sofia (2)	Sportist Sofia
1946	**Levski Sofia** (4)	Lokomotiv Sofia
1947	**Levski Sofia** (5)	Lokomotiv Sofia
1948	Septemvri pri CDV (1)	Levski Sofia

Notes:

- **Bold** indicates Double winners – i.e. League and Bulgarian Cup winners.

== Performances ==
=== Performances by club ===
Club	Winners	Runners-up
Levski Sofia	2	1
Lokomotiv Sofia	1	2
Septemvri pri CDV	1	–
Sportist Sofia	–	1

Notes:

- Italics indicates clubs no longer exist.

=== Performances by city ===
City	Winners	Runners-up
Sofia	4	4

== See also ==
- Bulgarian State Football Championship (Champions 1924–1944)
- Bulgarian A Football Group (Champions 1948–present)
