= Stefan Bozhkov =

Bulgarian footballer and coach

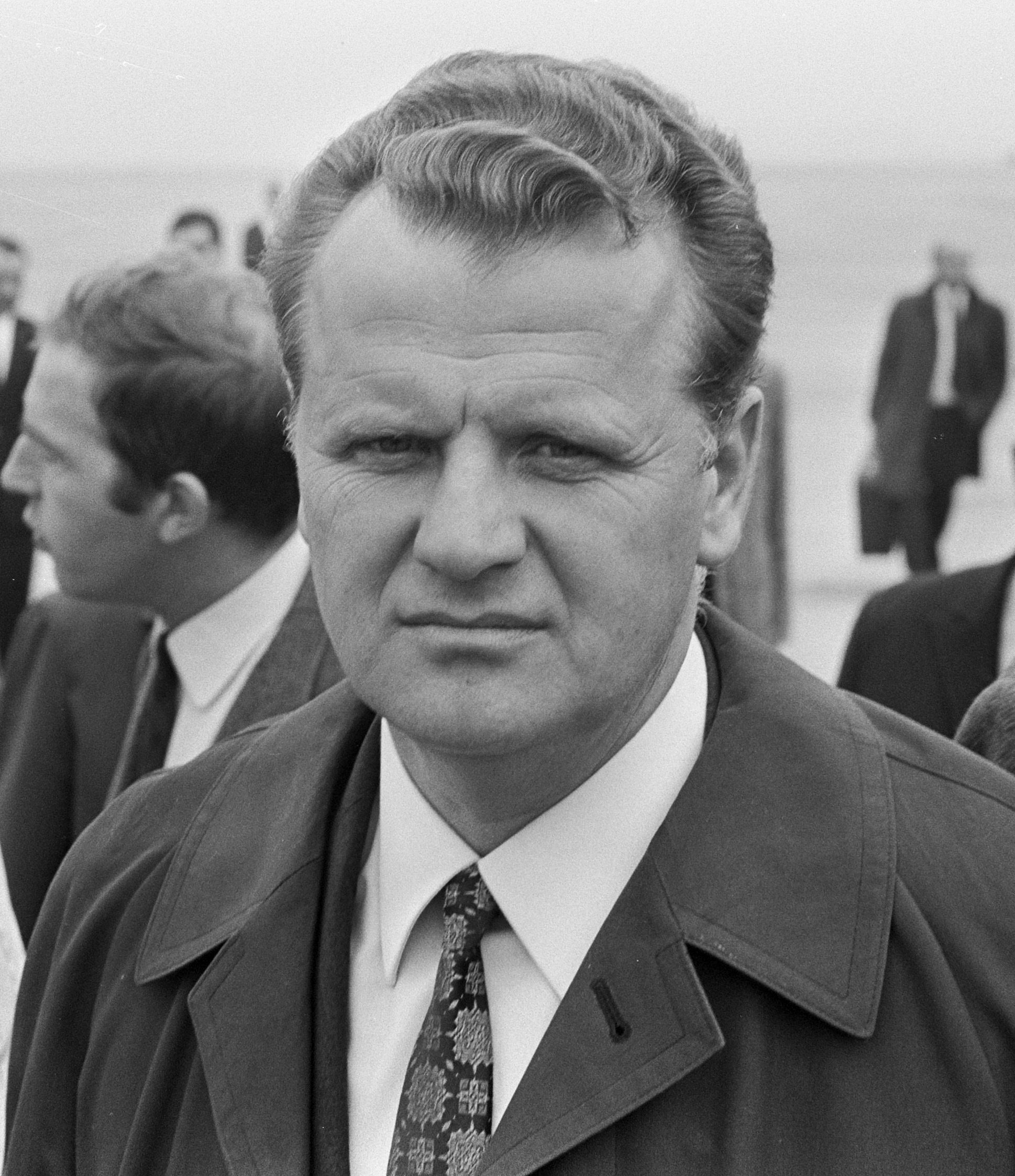
- Stefan Bozhkov in 1969

Personal information
- Full name: Stefan Bozhilov Stefanov
- Date of birth: 20 September 1923
- Place of birth: Sofia, Tsardom of Bulgaria
- Date of death: 1 February 2014 (aged 90)
- Position: Midfielder

Senior career*
Years	Team	Apps	(Gls)
1938–1946	Sportist Sofia		
1947–1948	SK Kladno		
1948–1960	CSKA Sofia	202	(45)

International career
1946–1958	Bulgaria	53	(4)

Managerial career
- 1960: Bulgaria
- 1966–1970: Bulgaria
- 1982: CSKA Sofia
Medal record
Representing Bulgaria
Olympic Games
Bronze medal – third place	1956 Melbourne	Team competition
Silver medal – second place	1968 Mexico	Team competition
- * Club domestic league appearances and goals

Stefan Bozhilov Stefanov (Bulgarian: Стефан Божилов Стефанов; 20 September 1923 – 1 February 2014) was a Bulgarian football player and coach. He usually played the position of midfielder.

== Career ==
Born in Sofia, Bozhkov first started to play for a local team Sportist Hadzhi Dimitar. He made his debut on 20 September 1938, on his 15th birthday, in a game against Fortuna. During his club career he played for PFC CSKA Sofia. Bozhkov won the top Bulgarian league, the A PFG, a ten times (all with CSKA), as well as the Bulgarian Cup, three times (all with CSKA). He earned 53 caps and scored 4 goals for the Bulgaria national football team from 1946 to 1958, and won a bronze medal at the 1956 Summer Olympics. He later coached the national team in the 1970 FIFA World Cup and won a silver medal at the 1968 Summer Olympics.

== Honours ==
=== International ===
Bulgaria

- Olympic Bronze Medal: 1956
