= 1947 Bulgarian Republic Football Championship =

3rd season of season of top-tier football league in Bulgaria

Bulgarian Republic Football Championship
- Season: 1947
- Champions: Levski Sofia

The 1947 Bulgarian Republic Football Championship was a national football competition in Bulgaria.

== Overview ==
It was contested by 16 teams, and the defending champions Levski Sofia won the championship.

== First round ==
Team 1	Score	Team 2
TVP Varna	2–0	Angel Kanchev Tryavna
Hadzhi Slavchev Pavlikeni	3–2	Slavia Plovdiv
Republikanets Lom	0–1	Lokomotiv Sofia
Lyubislav Burgas	2–2 (a.e.t.)	Spartak Varna
Levski Sofia	4–0	Ilinden Petrich
Benkovski Vidin	2–1	Lokomotiv Ruse
Spartak Sofia	2–0	Marek Dupnitsa
Levski Plovdiv	2–1	Loko Stara Zagora
Replay
Lyubislav Burgas	0–1	Spartak Varna

== Quarter-finals ==
Team 1	Score	Team 2
Lokomotiv Sofia	3–0	TVP Varna
Spartak Varna	1–2	Levski Sofia
Hadzhi Slavchev Pavlikeni	0–1	Spartak Sofia
Benkovski Vidin	1–2	Levski Plovdiv

== Semi-finals ==
Team 1	Agg.	Team 2	1st leg	2nd leg
Lokomotiv Sofia	6–1	Spartak Sofia	3–1	3–0
Levski Plovdiv	1–9	Levski Sofia	0–4	1–5

== Final ==
=== First game ===
29 October 1947

Levski Sofia	1−1	Lokomotiv Sofia
Tsvetkov 16'	Report	Milev 80'

Yunak Stadium, Sofia
Attendance: 20,000

=== Second game ===
2 November 1947

Lokomotiv Sofia	0−1	Levski Sofia
	Report	Tomov 69'

Yunak Stadium, Sofia
Attendance: 25,000

Levski Sofia won 2–1 on aggregate.
