= Atanas Tsanov =

Bulgarian footballer

Personal information
- Date of birth: 28 January 1928
- Date of death: 28 September 2015 (aged 87)
- Position: Defender

International career
Years	Team	Apps	(Gls)
1948–1953	Bulgaria	2	(0)

Atanas Tsanov (28 January 1928 – 28 September 2015) was a Bulgarian footballer. He played in two matches for the Bulgaria national football team from 1948 to 1953. He was also part of Bulgaria's squad for the 1952 Summer Olympics, but he did not play in any matches.
