= Lyubomir Hranov =

Bulgarian footballer

Personal information
- Full name: Lyubomir Hranov
- Date of birth: 2 July 1923
- Place of birth: Bulgaria
- Date of death: 27 August 2011 (aged 88)
- Place of death: Sofia, Bulgaria
- Position: Midfielder

Senior career*
Years	Team	Apps	(Gls)
1941–1946	ZhSK Sofia	26	(9)
1947–1953	Levski Sofia	75	(21)
1953	Septemvri Sofia		

International career
1950–1953	Bulgaria	2	(0)

Managerial career
- Cherveno Zname Kyustendil
- Arda
- Bdin
- Dorostol
- Lokomotiv Gorna Oryahovitsa
- * Club domestic league appearances and goals

Lyubomir Hranov (Bulgarian: Любомир Хранов; 2 July 1923 – 27 August 2011) was a Bulgarian international footballer who played as a midfielder for clubs in Bulgaria.

== Career ==
Hranov began playing football for local clubs ZhSK Sofia and PFC Levski Sofia. He won the Bulgarian league five times and won the Bulgarian Cup three times. He was the league top-scorer in 1950 with 11 goals.

He made two appearances for the Bulgaria national football team.

After he retired from playing football, Hranov managed several clubs, including FC Cherveno Zname Kyustendil, FC Arda, FC Bdin, FC Dorostol and FC Lokomotiv Gorna Oryahovitsa.

== Honours ==
Levski Sofia

- Bulgarian champion – 1946, 1949, 1950, 1953
- Bulgarian Cup – 1946, 1949, 1950

== Personal ==
Hranov died at age 88 on 28 August 2011.
