= 2002–03 Bulgarian Cup =

Tournament details
- Country: Bulgaria

Final positions
- Champions: Levski Sofia (23rd title)
- Runners-up: Litex Lovech

Tournament statistics
- Top goal scorer(s): Boyko Velichkov (Lokomotiv Sofia); 7 goals

The 2002–03 Bulgarian Cup was the 63rd season of the Bulgarian Cup. Levski Sofia won the competition, beating Litex Lovech 2–1 in the final at the Vasil Levski National Stadium in Sofia.

== First round ==
In this round entered winners from the preliminary rounds together with the teams of B Group.

Team 1	Score	Team 2
9 October 2002
Sliven 2000 (III)	1–0	Belite orli Pleven (II)
Slanchev Bryag Nesebar (III)	5–0	Spartak Pleven (II)
FC Beroe (IV)	0–8	Rodopa Smolyan (II)
Botev Boboshevo (III)	3–1	Botev Vratsa (II)
Hebar Pazardzhik (III)	3–3 (a.e.t.) (7–5 p)	Conegliano German (II)
Kameno (III)	2–0	Beroe Stara Zagora (II)
Chernomorets Balchik (III)	2–1	Olimpik Teteven (II)
Shumen (III)	0–2	Pirin Blagoevgrad (II)
Vihar-Vladislav (III)	1–0	Dunav Ruse (II)
Lokomotiv Dryanovo (III)	2–5	Svetkavitsa Targovishte (II)
Minyor Pernik (III)	0–1	Makedonska Slava (II)
Etar 1924 (III)	0–0 (a.e.t.) (3–5 p)	Sokol Markovo (II)
Botev Ihtiman (III)	3–5	Belasitsa Petrich (II)
Haskovo (III)	0–1	Vidima-Rakovski (II)
Levski Glavinitsa (III)	1–2	Yantra Gabrovo (II)
Lokomotiv Mezdra (III)	2–1 (a.e.t.)	Akademik Svishtov (II)

== Second round ==
In this round entered winners from the First Round together with the teams of A Group.

=== First legs ===
29 October 2002	Chernomorets Balchik (III)	0−1	Marek Dupnitsa	Balchik
14:00 EEST			Bibishkov 68'	Stadium: Balchik

30 October 2002	Belasitsa Petrich (II)	2−3	CSKA Sofia	Petrich
14:00 EEST	Radojičić 56'; Salis 85'		Deyanov 38'; Šakiri 61'; Zlatkov 73'	Stadium: Tsar Samuil

30 October 2002	Vihar-Vladislav (III)	0−5	Litex Lovech	Valchi Dol
14:00 EEST			Kakalov 6'; A. Todorov 42', 44', 68'; Palankov 70'	Stadium: Valchi Dol

30 October 2002	Botev Plovdiv	2−3	Makedonska Slava (II)	Plovdiv
14:00 EEST	Zaychev 25'; Milenov 74'		Paparkov 38' (pen.); Maksimov 55', 90'	Stadium: Hristo Botev

30 October 2002	Yantra Gabrovo (II)	1−2	Lokomotiv Plovdiv	Gabrovo
14:00 EEST	Panayotov 15'		P. Kolev 45'; Kamburov 55'	Stadium: Hristo Botev

=== Second legs ===
16 November 2002	Marek Dupnitsa	6−0 (7−0 agg.)	Chernomorets Balchik (III)	Dupnitsa
14:00 EEST				Stadium: Bonchuk

16 November 2002	CSKA Sofia	3−2 (6−4 agg.)	Belasitsa Petrich (II)	Sofia
14:00 EEST	Agnaldo 10'; V. Dimitrov 19'; Gargorov 58' (pen.)		Junivan 52', 71'	Stadium: Balgarska Armiya

16 November 2002	Litex Lovech	2−0 (7−0 agg.)	Vihar-Vladislav (III)	Lovech
14:00 EEST	A. Todorov 24', 63'			Stadium: Gradski

16 November 2002	Makedonska Slava (II)	0−0 (3−2 agg.)	Botev Plovdiv	Simitli
14:00 EEST				Stadium: Struma

16 November 2002	Lokomotiv Plovdiv	3−0 (5−1 agg.)	Yantra Gabrovo (II)	Plovdiv
14:00 EEST	Orlovski 39'; Atanasov 50'; M. Zafirov 84'			Stadium: Lokomotiv

== Third round ==
=== First legs ===
30 November 2002	Cherno More Varna	0−1	Litex Lovech	Varna
14:00 EEST			D. Rusev 53'	Stadium: Ticha

30 November 2002	Marek Dupnitsa	4−0	Dobrudzha Dobrich	Dupnitsa
13:30 EEST	Lyubenov 56'; Bibishkov 61', 71'; Koemdzhiev 88'			Stadium: Bonchuk

30 November 2002	Vidima-Rakovski (II)	2−0	Chernomorets Burgas	Sevlievo
13:30 EEST	Redovski 1'; Yankov 76'			Stadium: Rakovski

30 November 2002	Lokomotiv Plovdiv	6−0	Spartak Sofia (III)	Plovdiv
13:30 EEST	Paskov 31'; Kamburov 37'; Jayeoba 46', 50'; G. Stoyanov 58', 83'			Stadium: Lokomotiv

30 November 2002	Slavia Sofia	4−0	Lokomotiv Sofia	Sofia
13:30 EEST	Rangelov 21'; Kushev 70', 83'; Ivanović 78'			Stadium: Slavia

30 November 2002	Spartak Varna	0−0	Levski Sofia	Varna
13:30 EEST	Krumov (yellow card); V. Stanchev (yellow card); Krizmanić (yellow card); Karakanov (yellow card) (yellow-red card) 17'; Mihaylov (yellow card) (yellow-red card) 39'	report	Genchev (yellow card); Chilikov (yellow card)	Stadium: Spartak; Attendance: 2,500; Referee: Hristo Ristoskov (Sandanski)

30 November 2002	Rilski Sportist	2−1	CSKA Sofia	Samokov
13:30 EEST	Kirov 26' (pen.); Gemedzhiev 54'; Adzhov (red card) 78'	report	Yanchev 39'; Yanchev (red card) 78'	Stadium: Iskar

30 November 2002	Makedonska Slava (II)	3−0	Botev Boboshevo (III)	Simitli
13:30 EEST	Stoimenov 45+1'; Borislavov 66'; Mihaylov 85' (o.g.)			Stadium: Struma

=== Second legs ===
6 December 2002	Litex Lovech	2−0 (3−0 agg.)	Cherno More Varna	Lovech
13:30 EEST	Bornosuzov 45'; D. Rusev 47'			Stadium: Gradski; Attendance: 300

7 December 2002	Dobrudzha Dobrich	2−2 (2−6 agg.)	Marek Dupnitsa	Dobrich
13:30 EEST	K. Todorov 28'; Krastev 45' (pen.)		M. Todorov 18'; Stoykov 74'	Stadium: Druzhba; Attendance: 50

7 December 2002	Chernomorets Burgas	3−0 (a.e.t.) (3−2 agg.)	Vidima-Rakovski (II)	Burgas
13:30 EEST	Ivanikov 6', 90'; P. Kolev 94'			Stadium: Chernomorets; Attendance: 1,000

7 December 2002	Spartak Sofia (III)	3−0 (3−6 agg.)	Lokomotiv Plovdiv	German
13:30 EEST	Paylekov 70', 78'; Aladzhov 88'			Stadium: German; Attendance: 50

7 December 2002	Lokomotiv Sofia	1−0 (1−4 agg.)	Slavia Sofia	Sofia
13:30 EEST	Velichkov 20'			Stadium: Lokomotiv; Attendance: 100

7 December 2002	Levski Sofia	2−0 (2−0 agg.)	Spartak Varna	Sofia
13:30 EEST	Chilikov 46', 75'; I. Stoyanov (yellow card); Bachkov (yellow card); Topuzakov (yellow card) (yellow-red card) 55'	report	Zhekov (yellow card); Mechedzhiev (red card) 60'	Stadium: Georgi Asparuhov; Attendance: 500; Referee: Anton Genov (Gabrovo)

7 December 2002	CSKA Sofia	6−0 (7−2 agg.)	Rilski Sportist	Sofia
13:30 EEST	Sokolov 8' (o.g.); Šakiri 13'; Agnaldo 33', 86'; Brito 52'; Mukansi 90'	report		Stadium: Balgarska Armiya; Attendance: 650; Referee: Zhivko Dimitrov (Varna)

7 December 2002	Botev Boboshevo (III)	1−2 (1−5 agg.)	Makedonska Slava (II)	Blagoevgrad
13:30 EEST	Tsvetkov 54'		Maksimov 70', 74'	Stadium: Hristo Botev; Attendance: 500

== Quarter-finals ==
=== First legs ===
19 February 2003	CSKA Sofia	3−2	Makedonska Slava (II)	Sofia
13:30 EEST	Gargorov 7', 75' (pen.); V. Dimitrov 73'		Gerganchev 45+1'; Gueye 52' (o.g.)	Stadium: Balgarska Armiya; Attendance: 1,100

19 February 2003	Chernomorets Burgas	1−0	Marek Dupnitsa	Burgas
13:30 EEST	Hristiyanov 90'			Stadium: Chernomorets; Attendance: 150

19 February 2003	Levski Sofia	1−0	Lokomotiv Plovdiv	Sofia
14:30 EEST	Chilikov 16'			Stadium: Georgi Asparuhov; Attendance: 1,000

4 March 2003	Slavia Sofia	2−0	Litex Lovech	Sofia
12:30 EEST	Vladimirov 10'; B. Georgiev 72' (pen.)		Jelenković (red card) 86'	Stadium: Slavia; Attendance: 600

=== Second legs ===
4 March 2003	Makedonska Slava (II)	0−1 (2−4 agg.)	CSKA Sofia	Simitli
14:00 EEST			Yanchev 81'	Stadium: Struma; Attendance: 5,500

4 March 2003	Marek Dupnitsa	2−0 (a.e.t.) (2−1 agg.)	Chernomorets Burgas	Dupnitsa
14:00 EEST	Mujiri 77' (pen.), 118' (pen.)			Stadium: Bonchuk; Attendance: 500

4 March 2003	Lokomotiv Plovdiv	1−1 (1−2 agg.)	Levski Sofia	Plovdiv
14:30 EEST	Paskov 61'		Telkiyski 56'	Stadium: Lokomotiv; Attendance: 7,500

12 March 2003	Litex Lovech	2−0 (a.e.t.) (2−2 agg.) (5–4 p)	Slavia Sofia	Lovech
16:30 EEST	Bogunović 11'; Kirilov 63'			Stadium: Gradski; Attendance: 3,500
	Penalties
	Henrique (penalty scored); Bornosuzov (penalty missed); D. Rusev (penalty scored); Yovov (penalty scored); Hdiouad (penalty scored); Zhelev (penalty scored)		(penalty scored) Ivanović; (penalty scored) Đukić; (penalty missed) Vladimirov; (penalty scored) Y. Petkov; (penalty scored) Nikolovski; (penalty missed) Simeonov

== Semi-finals ==
=== First legs ===
16 April 2003	Litex Lovech	2−0	Marek Dupnitsa	Lovech
15:00 EEST	Zhelev 29', 69'		Kirilov (red card) 45+1'	Stadium: Gradski; Attendance: 3,500

16 April 2003	CSKA Sofia	0−1	Levski Sofia	Sofia
17:00 EEST	F. Lima (yellow card); V. Dimitrov (yellow card)	report	Mendoza 90+4'; Ivankov (yellow card); Ibraimov (yellow card)	Stadium: Balgarska Armiya; Attendance: 15,000; Referee: Ivan Dobrinov (Sofia)

=== Second legs ===
3 May 2003	Marek Dupnitsa	0−4 (0−6 agg.)	Litex Lovech	Dupnitsa
15:00 EEST	A. Kyuchukov (yellow card)	report	D. Rusev 2'; Yovov 52'; K. Nikolov 86'; A. Todorov 89'; Bornosuzov (yellow card)	Stadium: Bonchuk; Attendance: 800; Referee: Hristo Ristoskov (Sandanski)

3 May 2003	Levski Sofia	0−0 (1−0 agg.)	CSKA Sofia	Sofia
17:30 EEST	Simonović (yellow card); Ibraimov (yellow card); Golovskoy (yellow card); Angelov (yellow card); Angelov (red card) 70'	report	Tomash (yellow card); Gueye (yellow card); V. Dimitrov (yellow card); Yanev (red card) 70'	Stadium: Georgi Asparuhov; Attendance: 17,000; Referee: Anton Genov (Gabrovo)

== Final ==
The final match of the 2002–03 edition of the Bulgarian Cup was held on 21 May 2003 at the Vasil Levski National Stadium in Sofia. Levski Sofia beat Litex Lovech 2–1.

=== Details ===
21 May 2003
19:00 EEST

Litex Lovech	1–2	Levski Sofia
Hdiouad 89'	Report	Golovskoy 48'; Simonović 82'

Vasil Levski National Stadium, Sofia
Attendance: 10,453
Referee: Ivan Dobrinov (Sofia)

Litex	Levski
