= 2001–02 Bulgarian Cup =

Tournament details
- Country: Bulgaria

Final positions
- Champions: Levski Sofia (22nd title)
- Runners-up: CSKA Sofia

The 2001–02 Bulgarian Cup was the 62nd season of the Bulgarian Cup. Levski Sofia won the competition, beating CSKA Sofia 3–1 in the final at the Stadion Slavia in Sofia.

== First round ==
In this round entered winners from the preliminary rounds together with the teams of B Group.

23 September 2001	Bdin Vidin (III)	0–3	Botev Vratsa (II)	Vidin
16:00 EEST			Sofroniev 15', 83'; Georgiev 90'	Stadium: Georgi Benkovski; Attendance: 500

23 September 2001	Dulovo'98 (III)	1–3	Botev Plovdiv (II)	Dulovo
16:00 EEST	Kurdov 77' (pen.)		B. Dimitrov 7', 20'; K. Ivanov 37'	Stadium: Gradski; Attendance: 1,200

23 September 2001	Spartak Plovdiv (III)	3–0	Svilengrad (II)	Plovdiv
16:00 EEST	Yordanov 43'; D. Petkov 54'; Yankov 75'			Stadium: Todor Diev; Attendance: 500

23 September 2001	Dobrich 2000 (III)	3–1	Devnya (II)	Dobrich
16:00 EEST	Petrov 78'; R. Boev 83'; Genchev 87'		D. Ivanov 89'	Stadium: Druzhba; Attendance: 200

23 September 2001	Dragoman (III)	0–1	Dunav Ruse (II)	Dragoman
16:00 EEST			Dimitrov 78'	Stadium: Granichar

23 September 2001	Slanchev Bryag Nesebar (III)	0–1	Rilski Sportist (II)	Nesebar
16:00 EEST			Borinarov 15'	Stadium: Nesebar; Attendance: 300

23 September 2001	Fairplay Varna (III)	2–1	Minyor Pernik (II)	Varna
16:00 EEST	M. Ivanov 12'; Radomirov 62' (pen.)		Georgiev 49'	Stadium: Yuri Gagarin; Attendance: 255

23 September 2001	Rodopa Smolyan (III)	2–1	Belite Orli Pleven (II)	Smolyan
16:00 EEST	Hristov 3' (pen.); Aleksandrov 78'		V. Rusev 55' (pen.)	Stadium: Septemvri

23 September 2001	Lokomotiv Novi Iskar (III)	0–0 (a.e.t.) (5–4 p)	Akademik Svishtov (II)	Novi Iskar
16:00 EEST				Stadium: Gradski; Attendance: 300

23 September 2001	Loviko Suhindol (III)	0–3	Dobrudzha Dobrich (II)	Suhindol
16:00 EEST			Kiskinov 32'; Zdravkov 50', 75'	Stadium: Loviko; Attendance: 200

23 September 2001	Sitomir Nikopol (III)	0–3	Pirin Blagoevgrad (II)	Nikopol
16:00 EEST			Daskalov 38'; Rumenov 76', 85'	Stadium: Sitomir

== Second round ==
In this round entered winners from the First Round together with the teams of A Group.

23 October 2001	Dobrich 2000 (III)	1–5	Litex Lovech	Dobrich
15:00 EEST	R. Boev 90' (pen.)		Yurukov 7'; D. Gerchev 17' (o.g.); K. Nikolov 43'; Brasão 44'; Hdiouad 79'	Stadium: Druzhba; Attendance: 2,000

24 October 2001	Minyor Bobov Dol (III)	0–4	Slavia Sofia	Bobov Dol
15:00 EEST			Kushev 35', 89'; Bl. Georgiev 64'; Shopov 70'	Stadium: Nikolay Krastev-Schultz; Attendance: 2,000

24 October 2001	Vidima-Rakovski (II)	1–1 (a.e.t.) (5–3 p)	Lokomotiv Sofia	Sevlievo
15:00 EEST	Stoychev 50'		Mukansi 75'	Stadium: Rakovski; Attendance: 1,700
	Penalties
	Shankulov (penalty scored); Yordanov (penalty scored); Stoychev (penalty scored); Terziev (penalty scored); Nenov (penalty scored)		(penalty scored) Dafchev; (penalty missed) Velichkov; (penalty scored) Evtimov; (penalty scored) Mukansi

24 October 2001	Yantra Gabrovo (III)	1–2	CSKA Sofia	Gabrovo
15:00 EEST	E. Georgiev 90+1' (pen.)	report	Moke 38', 42'; Vranješ (yellow card)	Stadium: Hristo Botev; Attendance: 3,000; Referee: Nikolay Danev

24 October 2001	Pirin Blagoevgrad (II)	0–1	Levski Sofia	Blagoevgrad
15:00 EEST	Krastev (yellow card)	report	Gaúcho 50'; Pantelić (yellow card); Telkiyski (yellow card)	Stadium: Hristo Botev; Attendance: 4,200; Referee: Apostol Apostolov (Simitli)

24 October 2001	Strumska Slava (III)	2–4	Botev Plovdiv (II)	Radomir
15:00 EEST	G. Dimitrov 11', 25'		Arizanov 22'; Bankin 45'; Sabotinov 74', 90'	Stadium: Gradski; Attendance: 500

24 October 2001	Lokomotiv Novi Iskar (III)	0–2	Lokomotiv Plovdiv	Novi Iskar
15:00 EEST			Jayeoba 63', 79'	Stadium: Gradski; Attendance: 400

24 October 2001	Cherno More Varna	5–0	Botev Vratsa (II)	Varna
15:00 EEST	M. Petkov 3'; Dionisiev 25'; P. Zlatinov 37', 43'; Gigov 70'			Stadium: Ticha; Attendance: 200

24 October 2001	Rodopa Smolyan (III)	0–0 (a.e.t.) (6–5 p)	Chernomorets Burgas	Smolyan
15:00 EEST				Stadium: Septemvri; Attendance: 3,500

24 October 2001	Svetkavitsa Targovishte (II)	1–0	Belasitsa Petrich	Targovishte
15:00 EEST	Rumenov 50' (pen.)			Stadium: Dimitar Burkov; Attendance: 1,200

24 October 2001	Spartak Plovdiv (III)	0–1 (a.e.t.)	Neftochimic Burgas	Plovdiv
15:00 EEST			Orachev 107'	Stadium: Todor Diev; Attendance: 2,000

24 October 2001	Fairplay Varna (III)	0–3	Spartak Varna	Varna
15:00 EEST			Simeonov 1'; Mirchev 16'; An. Petrov 35'	Stadium: Yuri Gagarin; Attendance: 300

24 October 2001	Lokomotiv Ruse (III)	1–3	Dunav Ruse (II)	Ruse
15:00 EEST	Krastev 62' (pen.)		Glonti 58'; Kanev 88'; D. Dimitrov 90'	Stadium: Gradski; Attendance: 1,000

24 October 2001	Rozova Dolina (III)	0–4	Spartak Pleven	Kazanlak
15:00 EEST			K. Markov 16'; Joksimović 20'; E. Todorov 68'; T. Kolev 73'	Stadium: Sevtopolis; Attendance: 2,000

24 October 2001	Rilski Sportist (II)	2–1	Beroe Stara Zagora	Samokov
15:00 EEST	Yonov 33' (o.g.); E. Petrov 61'		Shishkov 43'	Stadium: Iskar; Attendance: 2,500

24 October 2001	Dobrudzha Dobrich (II)	1–3	Marek Dupnitsa	Dobrich
15:00 EEST	At. Georgiev 77'		Lyubenov 62'; V. Dimitrov 90'; Kirilov 90+2'	Stadium: Druzhba; Attendance: 3,000

== Third round ==
28 November 2001	Rodopa Smolyan (III)	0–2	Lokomotiv Plovdiv	Smolyan
13:30 EEST			Jayeoba 65'; M. Mihaylov 90'	Stadium: Septemvri; Attendance: 5,000

28 November 2001	Slavia Sofia	3–2	Vidima-Rakovski (II)	Sofia
13:30 EEST	Rangelov 5'; Vladimirov 67'; Kushev 73'		Ignatov 35'; Shankulov 60'	Stadium: Slavia; Attendance: 500

28 November 2001	Levski Sofia	4–0	Spartak Varna	Sofia
13:30 EEST	Telkiyski 11'; Angelov 30'; Pantelić 34', 67'; Dragić (yellow card)		R. Todorov (yellow card); An. Petrov (yellow card)	Stadium: Georgi Asparuhov; Attendance: 500; Referee: Yordan Ivanov (Sofia)

28 November 2001	Dunav Ruse (II)	2–1 (a.e.t.)	Botev Plovdiv (II)	Ruse
13:30 EEST	R. Angelov 27'; Kanev 108'		Teofoolu 8'	Stadium: Gradski; Attendance: 200

28 November 2001	Svetkavitsa Targovishte (II)	0–3	Litex Lovech	Targovishte
13:30 EEST			Hdiouad 24'; Yurukov 28', 43'	Stadium: Dimitar Burkov; Attendance: 7,000

28 November 2001	Rilski Sportist (II)	4–1	Spartak Pleven	Samokov
13:30 EEST	I. Petrov 20'; K. Aleksandrov 32'; Kaptiev 42', 74'		Panayotov 49'	Stadium: Iskar; Attendance: 4,000

28 November 2001	Marek Dupnitsa	3–1	Neftochimic Burgas	Dupnitsa
13:30 EEST	Kirilov 37', 81'; Evtimov 43'		St. Dimitrov 56'	Stadium: Bonchuk; Attendance: 800

28 November 2001	CSKA Sofia	3–2	Cherno More Varna	Sofia
13:30 EEST	Manchev 54'; Yanev 56'; Penev 89'; Sv. Petrov (yellow card) 53'; Yanchev (yellow card) 60'; Valkanov (yellow card) 70'	report	Dobrev 43'; Gigov 90'; I. Mihaylov (yellow card) 56'; St. Georgiev (yellow card) 58'; Dionisiev (yellow card) 63'	Stadium: Balgarska Armiya; Attendance: 500; Referee: Hristo Hristolov

== Quarter-finals ==
=== First legs ===
27 February 2002	Litex Lovech	8–1	Dunav Ruse (II)	Lovech
14:30 EEST	Dedé 9', 24', 46', 51', 89'; Hdiouad 39'; Grigorov 80' (o.g.); Henrique 88'		Henrique 2' (o.g.)	Stadium: Gradski; Attendance: 900

27 February 2002	Levski Sofia	6–0	Rilski Sportist (II)	Sofia
14:30 EEST	B. Ivanov 2', 5', 83'; Bachev 34'; Kabát 37'; Chilikov 49'; Stoilov (yellow card)	report	Spasov (yellow card)	Stadium: Georgi Asparuhov; Attendance: 1,500; Referee: Stefan Gospodinov (Stara Zagora)

27 February 2002	Marek Dupnitsa	1–1	Slavia Sofia	Dupnitsa
14:30 EEST	Kr. Dimitrov 36'		Vladimirov 18'	Stadium: Bonchuk; Attendance: 2,500

27 February 2002	Lokomotiv Plovdiv	0–1	CSKA Sofia	Plovdiv
15:00 EEST	A. Kyuchukov (yellow card) 12'	report	Yanev 90+3'; Moke (yellow card) 12'; Stoykov (yellow card) 44'; Deyanov (yellow card) 61'	Stadium: Lokomotiv; Attendance: 15,000

=== Second legs ===
20 March 2002	Dunav Ruse (II)	0–5 (1–13 agg.)	Litex Lovech	Ruse
15:00 EEST			Yurukov 20', 53', 62'; Kirilov 32', 40'	Stadium: Gradski; Attendance: 500

20 March 2002	Rilski Sportist (II)	0–1 (0–7 agg.)	Levski Sofia	Samokov
15:00 EEST		report	Genchev 39'; I. Stoyanov (yellow card); Chilikov (yellow card)	Stadium: Iskar; Attendance: 3,000; Referee: Angel Angelov (Sofia)

20 March 2002	Slavia Sofia	2–2 (3–3 agg.)	Marek Dupnitsa	Sofia
15:00 EEST	A. Nikolov 15' (pen.); Vladimirov 51'		Kr. Dimitrov 23' (pen.); V. Dimitrov 90'	Stadium: Slavia; Attendance: 600

20 March 2002	CSKA Sofia	1–1 (2–1 agg.)	Lokomotiv Plovdiv	Sofia
17:30 EEST	Manchev 17'; Yanchev (yellow card)	report	Stoynev 20'; Paskov (yellow card)	Stadium: Balgarska Armiya; Attendance: 3,000; Referee: Momchil Vraykov (Pleven)

== Semi-finals ==
=== First legs ===
10 April 2002	Marek Dupnitsa	0–0	Levski Sofia	Dupnitsa
17:00 EEST	Aleksandrov (yellow card)	report	V. Ivanov (yellow card); Pantelić (yellow card)	Stadium: Bonchuk; Attendance: 4,500; Referee: Dimitar Kostov (Burgas)

10 April 2002	Litex Lovech	1–2	CSKA Sofia	Lovech
18:15 EEST	Yurukov 11'; Hdiouad (yellow card) 1'; Yurukov (yellow card) 6'; Yovov (yellow card) 15'; Zhelev (yellow card) 26'; Bornosuzov (red card) 87'	report	Manchev 3'; Yanchev 57'; Lukić (yellow card) 11'; Yanev (yellow card) 15'; Bukarev (red card) 87'	Stadium: Gradski; Attendance: 3,000

=== Second legs ===
1 May 2002	Levski Sofia	1–0 (1–0 agg.)	Marek Dupnitsa	Sofia
17:30 EEST	Chilikov 45'; Stoilov (yellow card); Pantelić (yellow card); Kushev (yellow card)	report	Velikov (yellow card); Kirilov (yellow card); Aleksandrov (yellow card); Yonkov (yellow card); Kr. Dimitrov (yellow card) (yellow-red card)	Stadium: Georgi Asparuhov; Attendance: 5,000; Referee: Kamen Aleksiev (Veliko Tarnovo)

1 May 2002	CSKA Sofia	5–3 (7–4 agg.)	Litex Lovech	Sofia
17:30 EEST	Ricard 31'; Manchev 47' (pen.); Yanev 49'; Giglio 87', 89'; Tomash (yellow card) 79'	report	K. Nikolov 45+3'; Yurukov 65'; Yovov 80'	Stadium: Balgarska Armiya; Attendance: 1,000; Referee: Ivan Dobrinov (Sofia)

== Final ==
The final match of the 2001–02 edition of the Bulgarian Cup was held on 15 May 2002 at the Stadion Slavia in Sofia. Levski Sofia beat CSKA Sofia 3–1.

=== Details ===
15 May 2002
18:00 EEST

CSKA Sofia	1–3	Levski Sofia
Dragić 31' (o.g.)		Golovskoy 47'; G. Ivanov 70'; Kabát 83'

Stadion Slavia, Sofia
Attendance: 17,500
Referee: Dimitar Dimitrov (Sofia)

CSKA	Levski

== Top scorers ==
Rank	Scorer	Club	Goals
1	(Bulgaria) Stefan Yurukov	Litex Lovech	8
2	(Brazil) Dedé	Litex Lovech	5
3	(Bulgaria) Vladimir Manchev	CSKA Sofia	4
4	(Bulgaria) Hristo Yanev	CSKA Sofia	3
4	(Bulgaria) Georgi Vladimirov	Slavia Sofia	3
4	(Morocco) Mourad Hdiouad	Litex Lovech	3
4	(Bulgaria) Biser Ivanov	Levski Sofia	3
4	(Nigeria) Ekundayo Jayeoba	Lokomotiv Plovdiv	3
4	(Bulgaria) Martin Kushev	Slavia Sofia	3
