= 2003 Bulgarian Cup final =

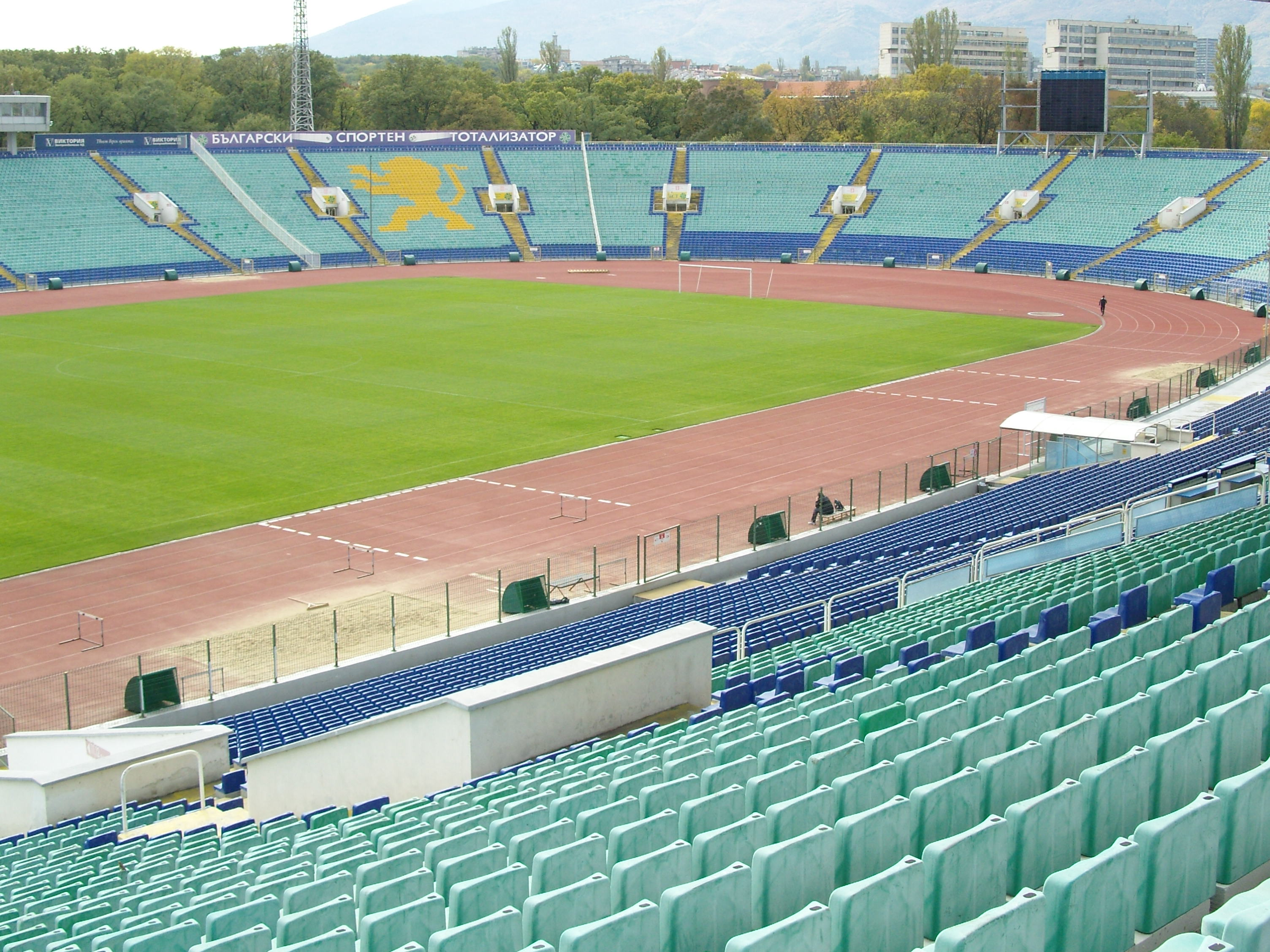
- Event: 2002–03 Bulgarian Cup
Litex Lovech	Levski Sofia
A Group	A Group
1	2
- Date: 21 May 2003
- Venue: Vasil Levski National Stadium, Sofia
- Referee: Ivan Dobrinov
- Attendance: 10,453

The 2003 Bulgarian Cup final was the final match of the 2002–03 edition of the Bulgarian Cup competition. It was the 21st consecutive Bulgarian Cup final match after the competition was established and 63rd national cup final overall.

The match was held on 21 May 2003 at the Vasil Levski National Stadium in Sofia, Bulgaria. Levski Sofia beat Litex Lovech 2–1. The win gave Levski their 24th Bulgarian Cup success.

== Match ==
=== Details ===
21 May 2003
19:00 EEST

Litex Lovech	1–2	Levski Sofia
Hdiouad 89'	Report	Golovskoy 48'; Simonović 82'

Vasil Levski National Stadium, Sofia
Attendance: 10,453
Referee: Ivan Dobrinov (Sofia)

Litex	Levski

Litex:
GK	12	(Bulgaria) Stoyan Stavrev
DF	13	(Bulgaria) Nikolay Dimitrov (substituted off) 90'
DF	3	(Bulgaria) Zhivko Zhelev (c)
DF	4	(Bulgaria) Zlatomir Zagorčić
DF	27	(Brazil) Tiago Silva
MF	23	(Serbia and Montenegro) Nebojša Jelenković
MF	30	(Bulgaria) Tsvetan Krastev
MF	10	(Bulgaria) Atanas Bornosuzov (yellow card) (substituted off) 77'
MF	18	(Morocco) Mourad Hdiouad (yellow card)
FW	11	(Bulgaria) Hristo Yovov (substituted off) 37'
FW	16	(Bulgaria) Desislav Rusev (yellow card)
Substitutes:
GK	1	(Bulgaria) Vitomir Vutov
DF	2	(Bulgaria) Stanislav Bachev
MF	8	(Bulgaria) Ivaylo Petev
MF	14	(Bulgaria) Kiril Nikolov (substituted in) 37'
MF	15	(Bulgaria) Anatoli Todorov (substituted in) 77'
FW	21	(Serbia and Montenegro) Saša Bogunović (substituted in) 90'
MF	32	(Togo) Paul Adado
Coach:
(Bulgaria) Ferario Spasov

Levski:
GK	27	(Bulgaria) Dimitar Ivankov (c)
DF	20	(Bulgaria) Stanislav Angelov (yellow card)
DF	22	(Bulgaria) Ilian Stoyanov
DF	26	(Nigeria) Omonigho Temile (yellow card)
DF	11	(Bulgaria) Elin Topuzakov
MF	4	(Bulgaria) Biser Ivanov (substituted off) 46'
MF	15	(Serbia and Montenegro) Saša Simonović
MF	10	(Nigeria) Garba Lawal (substituted off) 77'
MF	21	(Bulgaria) Dimitar Telkiyski (substituted off) 87'
FW	9	(Bulgaria) Todor Kolev
FW	19	(Bulgaria) Georgi Chilikov
Substitutes:
GK	1	(Bulgaria) Georgi Petkov
DF	3	(Bulgaria) Said Ibraimov
DF	5	(Bulgaria) Georgi Markov
FW	7	(Brazil) Marcelo Vavá (substituted in) 87'
MF	8	(Bulgaria) Stanislav Genchev
MF	17	(Russia) Konstantin Golovskoy (yellow card) (substituted in) 46'
MF	24	(Ecuador) Manuel Mendoza (substituted in) 77'
Coach:
(Bulgaria) Georgi Todorov

== See also ==
- 2002–03 A Group
