= 1963–64 Balkans Cup =

Tournament details
- Country: Balkans
- Teams: 8

Final positions
- Champions: (Romania) Rapid București
- Runners-up: (Bulgaria) Spartak Plovdiv

Tournament statistics
- Matches played: 17
- Goals scored: 41 (2.41 per match)

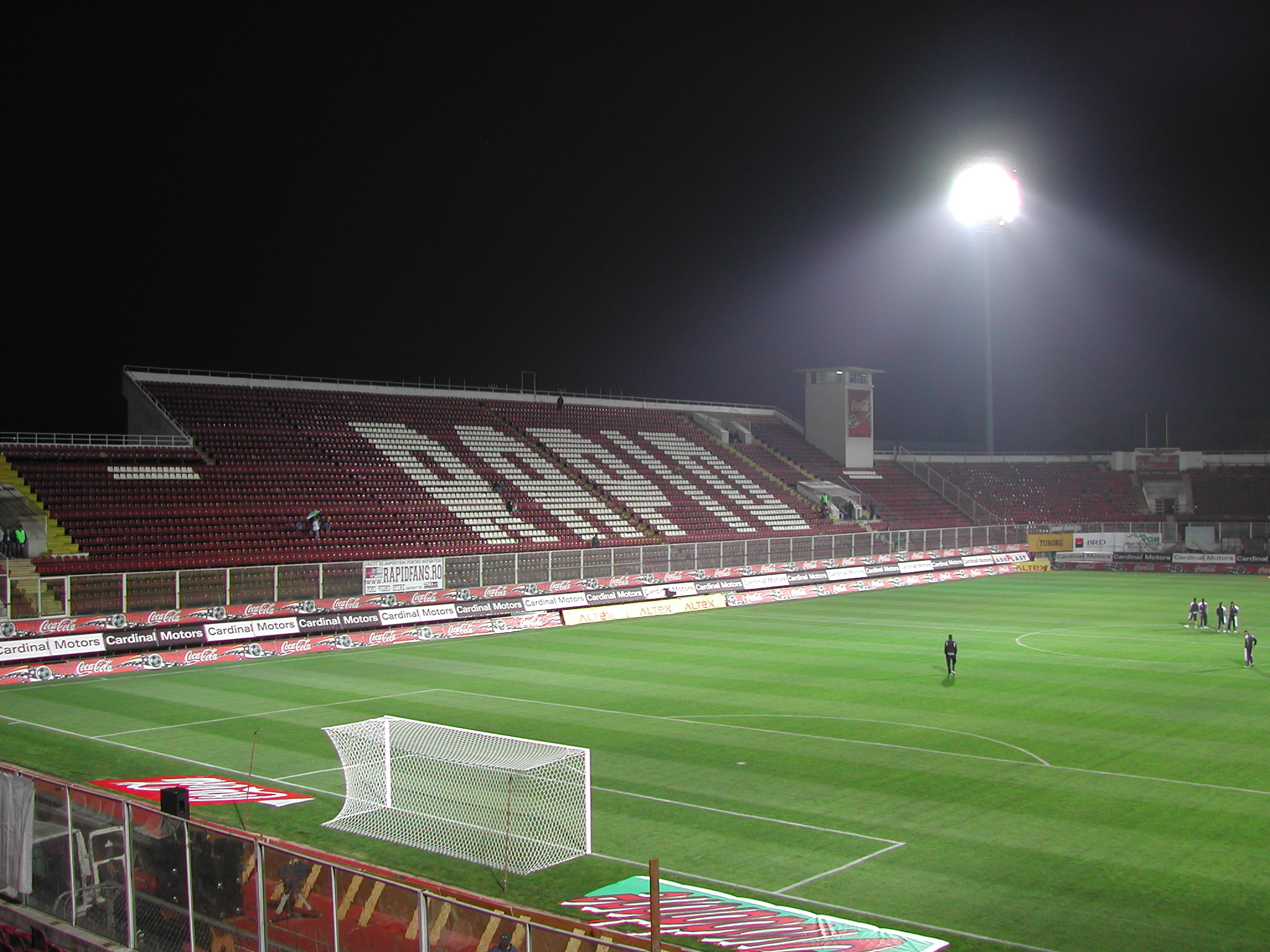
This picture shows the stand of the football ground Giuleşti-Valentin Stănescu. It is located in Bucharest, Romania and is the home ground of Rapid Bucureşti.

The 1963–64 Balkans Cup was an edition of the Balkans Cup, a football competition for representative clubs from the Balkan states. It was contested by 8 teams and Rapid București won the trophy.

== Group Stage ==
=== Group A ===
| Pos | Team | Pld | W | D | L | GF | GA | GR | Pts | Qualification |
|---|---|---|---|---|---|---|---|---|---|---|
| 1 | (Romania) Rapid București (A) | 6 | 4 | 2 | 0 | 9 | 2 | 4.500 | 10 | Advances to finals |
| 2 | (Bulgaria) Levski Sofia | 6 | 1 | 3 | 2 | 7 | 6 | 1.167 | 5 | |
| 3 | (Albania) Dinamo Tirana | 6 | 1 | 3 | 2 | 6 | 6 | 1.000 | 5 | |
| 4 | (Turkey) Beşiktaş | 6 | 1 | 2 | 3 | 2 | 10 | 0.200 | 4 | |

Source: rsssf.com
Rules for classification: 1) points; 2) goal average; 3) number of goals scored
(A) Advance to a further round
30 August 1963

| Beşiktaş (Turkey) | 1–0 | (Albania) Dinamo Tirana |
|---|---|---|
| Önüt 39' |

Mithat Paşa Stadium, Istanbul

4 September 1963

| Beşiktaş (Turkey) | 0–0 | (Romania) Rapid București |

Mithat Paşa Stadium, Istanbul

17 October 1963

| Dinamo Tirana (Albania) | 2–0^{1} | (Turkey) Beşiktaş (B) |
|---|---|---|
| Aleko Pilika 5'; Vorfi 41' |

Dinamo, Tirana

17 October 1963

| Rapid București (Romania) | 3–0^{1} | (Turkey) Beşiktaş |
|---|---|---|
| Georgescu 32'; Dinu 65'; Ionescu 82' |

Rapid, Bucharest

6 November 1963

| Beşiktaş (Turkey) | 1–1 | (Bulgaria) Levski Sofia |
|---|---|---|
| Özacar 21' | | Abadjev 69' |

Mithat Paşa Stadium, Istanbul

15 December 1963

| Dinamo Tirana (Albania) | 1–1 | (Romania) Rapid București |

Dinamo, Tirana

8 April 1964

| Dinamo Tirana (Albania) | 1–1 | (Bulgaria) Levski Sofia |

Dinamo, Tirana

8 July 1964

| Rapid București (Romania) | 2–0 | (Bulgaria) Levski Sofia |

Rapid, Bucharest

14 July 1964

| Levski Sofia (Bulgaria) | 1–1 | (Albania) Dinamo Tirana |

Rakovski, Sofia

15 July 1964

| Rapid București (Romania) | 2–1 | (Albania) Dinamo Tirana |

Rapid, Bucharest

7 August 1964

| Levski Sofia (Bulgaria) | 4–0 | (Turkey) Beşiktaş |
|---|---|---|
| Sokolov 17'; Iliev 20'; Manolov 67'; Gergide 80' |

Rakovski, Sofia

3 September 1964

| Levski Sofia (Bulgaria) | 0–1 | (Romania) Rapid București |

Rakovski, Sofia

Notes

- Note 1: Beşiktaş originally requested that their two away games in Tirana and Bucharest be played one day apart. But as the dates get closer, they noticed it was almost impossible for the team to play the two games at those dates. They decided to send the substitute players to Tirana together with some youth team players. Their travel took longer than expected and the game was moved from 16 October to 17 October. Team A played in Bucharest and Team B played in Tiranë the same day.

=== Group B ===
| Pos | Team | Pld | W | D | L | GF | GA | GR | Pts | Qualification |
|---|---|---|---|---|---|---|---|---|---|---|
| 1 | (Bulgaria) Spartak Plovdiv (A) | 4 | 4 | 0 | 0 | 12 | 6 | 2.000 | 8 | Advances to finals |
| 2 | (Greece) Olympiacos (Note: Olympiacos withdrew after their second loss to Spartak Plovdiv.) | 2 | 0 | 0 | 2 | 4 | 7 | 0.571 | 0 | |
| 3 | (Socialist Federal Republic of Yugoslavia) Radnički Niš (Note: Radnički Niš withdrew after their loss to Spartak Plovdiv.) | 2 | 0 | 0 | 2 | 2 | 5 | 0.400 | 0 | |
| 4 | (Turkey) Fenerbahçe (Note: Fenerbahçe withdrew before the tournament's beginning.) | 0 | 0 | 0 | 0 | 0 | 0 | — | 0 | |

Source: rsssf.com
Rules for classification: 1) points; 2) goal average; 3) number of goals scored
(A) Advance to a further round
Notes:

12 May 1963

| Spartak Plovdiv (Bulgaria) | 5–3 | (Greece) Olympiacos |

Spartak, Plovdiv

26 December 1963

| Olympiacos (Greece) | 1–2 | (Bulgaria) Spartak Plovdiv |

Karaiskakis, Piraeus

March 1964

| Spartak Plovdiv (Bulgaria) | 2–0 | (Socialist Federal Republic of Yugoslavia) Radnički Niš |

Spartak, Plovdiv

== Final ==
| Team 1 | Agg. | Team 2 | 1st leg | 2nd leg |
|---|---|---|---|---|
| Spartak Plovdiv (Bulgaria) | 1–3 | (Romania) Rapid București | 1–1 | 0–2 |

=== First leg ===
9 September 1964

| Spartak Plovdiv (Bulgaria) | 1–1 | (Romania) Rapid București |

Spartak, Plovdiv

=== Second leg ===
16 September 1964

| Rapid București (Romania) | 2–0 | (Bulgaria) Spartak Plovdiv |

Rapid, Bucharest

Rapid București won 3–1 on aggregate.
