= Georgi Petkov (footballer, born 1976) =

Bulgarian footballer (born 1976)

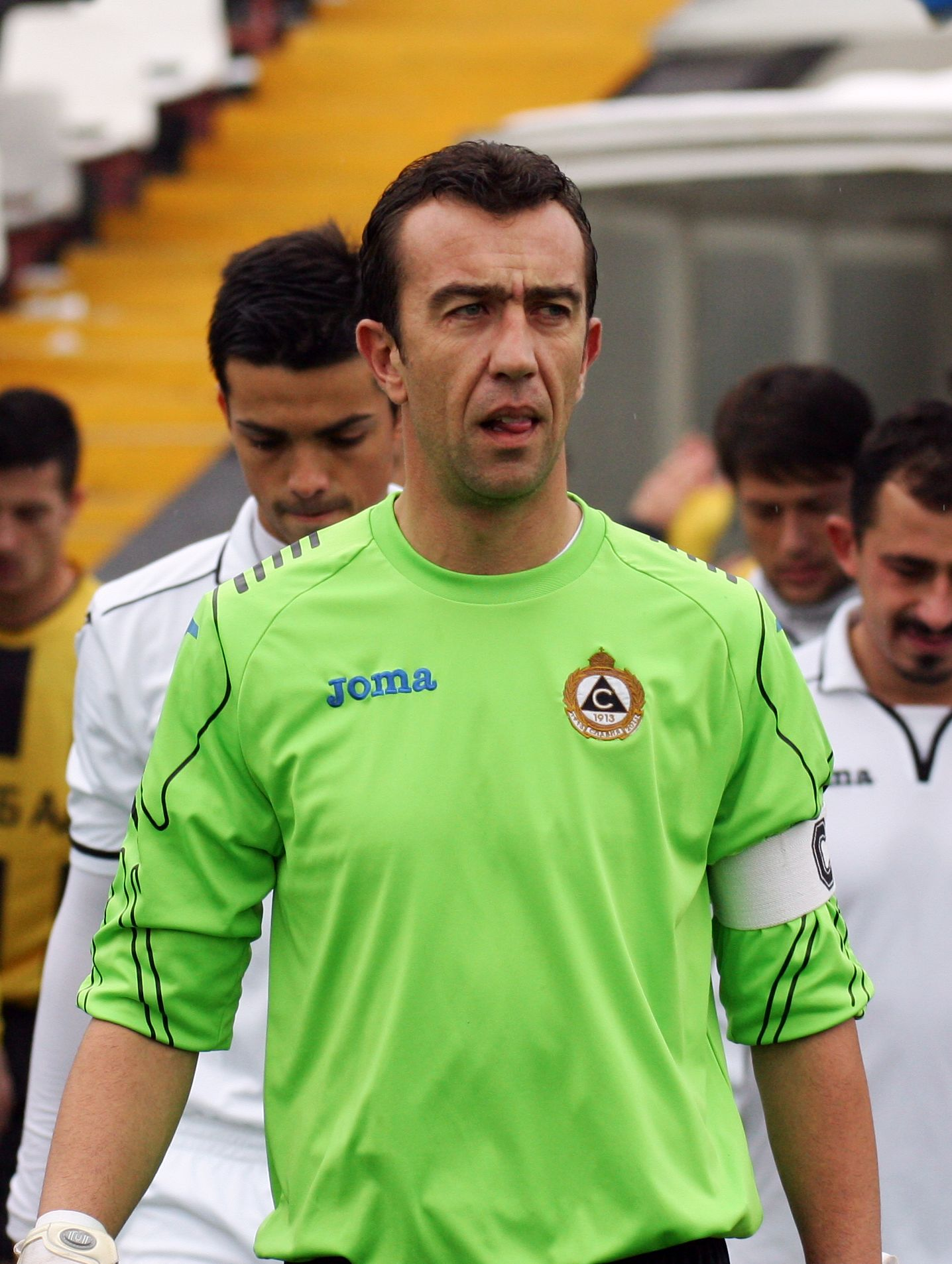
- Petkov with Slavia Sofia in 2013

Personal information
- Full name: Georgi Stoyanov Petkov
- Date of birth: 14 March 1976 (age 50)
- Place of birth: Pazardzhik, Bulgaria
- Height: 1.87 m (6 ft 2 in)
- Position: Goalkeeper

Team information
- Current team: Slavia Sofia
- Number: 1

Youth career
- 1983–1992: Hebar Pazardzhik
- 1992–1994: FC Bankya

Senior career*
Years	Team	Apps	(Gls)
1994–1996	FC Bankya	?	(0)
1996–2001	Slavia Sofia	51	(0)
2001–2011	Levski Sofia	149	(0)
2011–2012	Enosis Paralimni	19	(0)
2012–	Slavia Sofia	141	(0)

International career
1998–2009	Bulgaria	16	(0)
2018	Bulgaria	2	(0)
- * Club domestic league appearances and goals as of 08:44, 11 May 2025 (UTC)

Georgi Stoyanov Petkov (Bulgarian: Георги Стоянов Петков; born 14 March 1976) is a Bulgarian professional footballer who plays as a goalkeeper for and captains Bulgarian First League club Slavia Sofia. Petkov played for the Bulgaria national team as a backup to Zdravko Zdravkov and Dimitar Ivankov from 1998 until 2018, when he made his 18th and final appearance for his country at the age of 42.

== Career ==
=== Hebar Pazardzhik and Slavia Sofia ===
Born in Pazardzhik, Petkov started his career at local side Hebar. In June 1996, he was signed by A PFG club Slavia Sofia. Petkov started the 1996–97 season as the third choice goalkeeper and earned only two appearances in his first campaign at Slavia. Following Zdravko Zdravkov's transfer to Turkish İstanbulspor in June 1997, he was promoted to second choice.

=== Levski Sofia ===
In July 2001, Petkov joined Levski Sofia for a $400,000, breaking the Bulgarian goalkeeper transfer-record. He was a substitute of Dimitar Ivankov until that season.

After Ivankov left Levski, Petkov showed his real potential and became an important part of the team. With Petkov as a key player, his team was the first Bulgarian team to join the group stage of the UEFA Champions League. He was one of the few players that had their positions secure during the 07-08 transfer season, when a big part of the Levski players were sold. On 25 April 2008 a media report said that Petkov was wanted by Besiktas J.K. during the summer transfer season.

Petkov became a captain of PFC Levski, during the 2008/2009 season.

On 24 January 2008, during the pause of 2008/2009 season, Petkov was the number one goalkeeper in Europe, according to IMScouting. He conceded the fewest goals per minute. Petkov conceded one goal every 810 minutes.

He became a Champion of Bulgaria in 2009, after a contradictory but great season under the coaching of Emil Velev. Despite the bad results during the autumnal part of the season, after great matches in the spring, Levski Sofia fulfilled the plan before the term had set and became a champion for 26 time, before the last round has been played.

During 2009/2010 season, the Levski's team started their European campaign with 9:0 (on aggregate) in the second Qualifying round of Champions League against UE Sant Julià. On the next round, Levski Sofia faced FK Baku. The blues eliminated the team from Azerbaijan with 2:0 (on aggregate). In the play-off round Levski was eliminated by Debreceni VSC with 4:1 (on aggregate). However, Levski qualified for UEFA Europa League. In the group stage, Levski faced Villarreal CF, SS Lazio and Red Bull Salzburg. Levski achieved only one win and 5 losses. Levski took the win against SS Lazio, after Hristo Yovov scored the winning goal in the match. The match was played at Stadio Olimpico. In 2009/2010 season, after couple of bad games and results, Levski however achieved qualifying for UEFA Europa League becoming 3rd in the final ranking.

During the 2010/2011 Levski qualified for UEFA Europa League after eliminating Dundalk F.C., Kalmar FF and AIK Fotboll. Levski was drawn in Group C, facing Gent, Lille and Sporting CP. The first match was against Gent. Levski won the match in a 3–2 home win. The winning goal was scored by Serginho Greene. With this win Levski recorded 8 games in-a-row without losing in European competitions. After that Levski lost catastrophically from Sporting CP with 5–0. Followed by another loss against Lille. In Sofia Levski played very well against Lille and was leading 2–1 until Ivo Ivanov scored an own goal to make it 2–2. In the last match of the Group C, Levski take a win against Sporting CP with 1–0, the winning goal was scored by Daniel Mladenov.

On 10 January 2011, it was announced that Petkov is being released from the club. After ten years in Levski, Petkov told the media that he felt insulted by the actions of his former club.

=== Enosis Neon Paralimni ===
Georgi Petkov signed for Enosis Paralimni on 21 January 2011, making a winning debut 24 hours later, by beating Ermis Aradippou 3–1 in Tasos Markou Stadium.

=== Return to Slavia ===
Petkov rejoined Slavia Sofia on 22 June 2012. He quickly established himself as the first choice goalkeeper for the team.

On 9 May 2018, at the age of 42, Petkov was named man of the match in the 2018 Bulgarian Cup Final against Levski Sofia. He played an important role in the penalty shoot-out held after the teams remained tied 0–0 after extra time, making two saves.

On 12 July 2018, Petkov captained Slavia in the 1–0 away win over Finnish team Ilves in the first qualifying round of the Europa League, becoming the oldest Bulgarian footballer to appear in a European club tournament match.

According to IFFHS, Petkov was the oldest player in the world to feature in a match in the top tier of a national championship in 2022, aged 45 years and 343 days in his only appearance in the Bulgarian First League in 2022 against CSKA Sofia on 20 February, where he briefly lost consciousness after a harsh collision with an opponent, thus being taken to the hospital by ambulance. In the following year, however, he was the second-oldest to do so, at the age of 47 years and 222 days in a 0–1 loss to Hebar on 22 October, only behind Hungarian goalkeeper Géza Turi, who played in the Faroe Islands Premier League at the age of 49.

On 10 May 2025, at the age of 49, Petkov played the full 90 minutes and was chosen as the man of the match in the 0–0 league draw with Lokomotiv Sofia, reclaiming the record for the fifth-oldest active professional football player in the world.

On 23 July 2025, he announced that he would retire from football at the end of the 2025–26 season. However, he has extended his contract until 30 June 2027 and has been on the bench several times so far in the 2026–27 season.

== International career ==
Petkov earned 16 caps for Bulgaria between 1998 and 2009. He first played for the national team in the friendly 1–4 loss to Morocco in December 1998. In October 2018, after a 9-year absence from international duty and 20 years after his debut, he was recalled by Petar Hubchev for the UEFA Nations League matches against Cyprus and Norway. On 16 November 2018, in the 1:1 away draw with the Cypriots Petkov became the oldest European goalkeeper to play in an official match of their respective national team at the age of 42 years and 248 days. The previous record holder was Elisha Scott who played for Northern Ireland at the age of 42 years and 200 days. Petkov also played 3 days later against Slovenia.

== Career statistics ==
=== Club ===
As of match played 10 May 2025

Club	Season	League			Cup (Note: Includes appearances in Bulgarian Supercup)		Europe		Total	
Club	Season	Division	Apps	Goals	Apps	Goals	Apps	Goals	Apps	Goals
Slavia Sofia	1996–97	A Group	2	0	0	0	0	0	2	0
Slavia Sofia	1997–98	A Group	15	0	?	?	—		15	0
Slavia Sofia	1998–99	A Group	19	0	?	?	—		19	0
Slavia Sofia	1999–00	A Group	11	0	?	?	—		11	0
Slavia Sofia	2000–01	A Group	4	0	?	?	—		4	0
Slavia Sofia	Total		51	0	0	0	0	0	51	0
Levski Sofia	2001–02	A Group	27	0	5	0	8	0	40	0
Levski Sofia	2002–03	A Group	8	0	6	0	2	0	16	0
Levski Sofia	2003–04	A Group	2	0	3	0	0	0	5	0
Levski Sofia	2004–05	A Group	2	0	0	0	0	0	2	0
Levski Sofia	2005–06	A Group	23	0	2	0	13	0	38	0
Levski Sofia	2006–07	A Group	17	0	2	0	8	0	27	0
Levski Sofia	2007–08	A Group	28	0	1	0	2	0	31	0
Levski Sofia	2008–09	A Group	17	0	3	0	3	0	23	0
Levski Sofia	2009–10	A Group	19	0	0	0	9	0	28	0
Levski Sofia	2010–11	A Group	6	0	0	0	5	0	11	0
Levski Sofia	Total		149	0	22	0	50	0	221	0
Enosis Paralimni	2010–11	Cypriot First Division	8	0	0	0	–		8	0
Enosis Paralimni	2011–12	Cypriot First Division	11	0	0	0	–		11	0
Enosis Paralimni	Total		19	0	0	0	0	0	19	0
Slavia Sofia	2012–13	A Group	26	0	5	0	—		31	0
Slavia Sofia	2013–14	A Group	32	0	5	0	—		37	0
Slavia Sofia	2014–15	A Group	17	0	2	0	—		19	0
Slavia Sofia	2015–16	A Group	18	0	0	0	—		18	0
Slavia Sofia	2016–17	Bulgarian First League	16	0	3	0	0	0	19	0
Slavia Sofia	2017–18	Bulgarian First League	7	0	2	0	—		9	0
Slavia Sofia	2018–19	Bulgarian First League	14	0	2	0	2	0	18	0
Slavia Sofia	2019–20	Bulgarian First League	2	0	0	0	—		2	0
Slavia Sofia	2020–21	Bulgarian First League	4	0	0	0	0	0	4	0
Slavia Sofia	2021–22	Bulgarian First League	2	0	0	0	—		2	0
Slavia Sofia	2022–23	Bulgarian First League	1	0	0	0	—		1	0
Slavia Sofia	2023–24	Bulgarian First League	1	0	0	0	—		1	0
Slavia Sofia	2024–25	Bulgarian First League	1	0	0	0	—		1	0
Slavia Sofia	Total		141	0	19	0	2	0	162	0
Career totals			360	0	41	0	52	0	453	0

=== International ===
Appearances and goals by national team and year
Bulgaria
National team	Year	Apps	Goals
Bulgaria	1998	1	0
Bulgaria	1999	1	0
Bulgaria	2002	1	0
Bulgaria	2005	1	0
Bulgaria	2006	3	0
Bulgaria	2007	4	0
Bulgaria	2008	4	0
Bulgaria	2009	1	0
Bulgaria	2018	2	0
Total		18	0

== Honours ==
=== Club ===
- Levski Sofia
  - Bulgarian League (4): 2001–02, 2005–06, 2006–07, 2008–09
  - Bulgarian Cup (4): 2001–02, 2002–03, 2004–05, 2006–07
  - Bulgarian Supercup (3): 2005, 2007, 2009
- Slavia Sofia
  - Bulgarian Cup (1): 2017–18

=== Individual ===
- Bulgarian Goalkeeper of the Year (4): 2002, 2007, 2008, 2018
- Bulgarian Footballer of the Year: 2nd place (2008, 2018), 3rd place (2007)
