= Fábio Lima =

Fábio Lima may refer to:

- Fábio Lima (footballer, born 1981), Brazilian football centre-back
- Fábio Lima (futsal player) (born 1988), Portuguese futsal player
- Fábio Lima (footballer, born 1993), Emirati football forward
- Fábio Lima (footballer, born 1996), Brazilian football winger
