= Ibraimov =

Ibraimov is a Slavic surname. Notable people with the name include:

- Jumabek Ibraimov (1944–1999), Kyrgyz politician
- Said Ibraimov (born 1970), Bulgarian footballer
- Sultan Ibraimov (1927–1980), Kyrgyz politician
- Veli İbraimov (1888–1928), Russian revolutionary and politician
- Yermakhan Ibraimov (born 1972), Uzbek boxer
