= Manuel Mendoza =

Manuel Mendoza may refer to:

- Manuel V. Mendoza (1922-2001), American master sergeant active during WWII
- Manuel Mendoza (footballer, born 1976), Ecuadorian football defender
- Manuel Mendoza (footballer, born 1989), Ecuadorian football goalkeeper
