= 1962–63 A Group =

19th season of top-tier football league in Bulgaria

A Group
- Season: 1962–63
- Champions: Spartak Plovdiv (1st title)
- Relegated: Dobrudzha; Himik Dimitrovgrad
- European Cup: Spartak Plovdiv
- Inter-Cities Fairs Cup: Lokomotiv Plovdiv
- Matches: 240
- Goals: 630 (2.63 per match)
- Top goalscorer: Todor Diev (26 goals)

The 1962–63 A Group was the 15th season of the A Football Group, the top Bulgarian professional league for association football clubs, since its establishment in 1948.

== Overview ==
It was contested by 16 teams, including the defending champions CSKA Sofia which had won the championship for the last nine seasons consecutively. Spartak Plovdiv won the championship.

== League standings ==
| Pos | Team | Pld | W | D | L | GF | GA | GD | Pts | Qualification or relegation |
|---|---|---|---|---|---|---|---|---|---|---|
| 1 | Spartak Plovdiv (C) | 30 | 19 | 5 | 6 | 57 | 33 | +24 | 43 | Qualification for European Cup preliminary round |
| 2 | Botev Plovdiv | 30 | 17 | 6 | 7 | 55 | 26 | +29 | 40 | |
| 3 | CSKA Sofia | 30 | 14 | 9 | 7 | 55 | 28 | +27 | 37 | |
| 4 | Lokomotiv Sofia | 30 | 12 | 12 | 6 | 42 | 27 | +15 | 36 | |
| 5 | Spartak Sofia | 30 | 12 | 10 | 8 | 37 | 34 | +3 | 34 | |
| 6 | Levski Sofia | 30 | 8 | 16 | 6 | 41 | 31 | +10 | 32 | |
| 7 | Lokomotiv Plovdiv | 30 | 10 | 10 | 10 | 35 | 40 | −5 | 30 | Invitation for Inter-Cities Fairs Cup first round |
| 8 | Cherno More Varna | 30 | 11 | 7 | 12 | 26 | 33 | −7 | 29 | |
| 9 | Spartak Pleven | 30 | 10 | 8 | 12 | 39 | 43 | −4 | 28 | |
| 10 | Slavia Sofia | 30 | 9 | 9 | 12 | 36 | 38 | −2 | 27 | Qualification for Cup Winners' Cup first round |
| 11 | Dunav Ruse | 30 | 8 | 10 | 12 | 36 | 46 | −10 | 26 | |
| 12 | Beroe Stara Zagora | 30 | 8 | 9 | 13 | 32 | 44 | −12 | 25 | |
| 13 | Marek Dupnitsa | 30 | 10 | 5 | 15 | 41 | 56 | −15 | 25 | |
| 14 | Spartak Varna | 30 | 10 | 5 | 15 | 37 | 53 | −16 | 25 | |
| 15 | Dobrudzha Dobrich (R) | 30 | 7 | 9 | 14 | 25 | 38 | −13 | 23 | Relegation to 1963–64 B Group |
| 16 | Himik Dimitrovgrad (R) | 30 | 7 | 6 | 17 | 36 | 60 | −24 | 20 | Relegation to 1963–64 B Group |

Source: rsssf.com
(C) Champions; (R) Relegated

== Results ==
| Home \ Away | BSZ | BPD | CHM | CSK | DOB | DUN | HIM | LEV | LPL | LSO | MAR | SLA | SPL | SPD | SSF | SPV |
|---|---|---|---|---|---|---|---|---|---|---|---|---|---|---|---|---|
| Beroe Stara Zagora | | 3–2 | 1–1 | 1–1 | 2–1 | 3–1 | 4–0 | 2–1 | 2–3 | 2–1 | 2–1 | 2–1 | 3–0 | 1–2 | 0–1 | 2–0 |
| Botev Plovdiv | 3–0 | | 1–0 | 2–1 | 1–0 | 2–0 | 6–1 | 0–0 | 0–0 | 0–0 | 1–0 | 0–1 | 0–1 | 1–0 | 2–0 | 6–0 |
| Cherno More | 1–0 | 1–3 | | 0–3 | 1–0 | 2–1 | 2–1 | 2–1 | 2–1 | 0–2 | 1–0 | 1–0 | 2–1 | 0–2 | 2–2 | 2–1 |
| CSKA Sofia | 5–0 | 1–2 | 1–1 | | 0–1 | 3–1 | 4–1 | 1–1 | 1–1 | 0–1 | 3–0 | 2–1 | 2–1 | 0–1 | 3–0 | 5–1 |
| Dobrudzha Dobrich | 2–0 | 1–0 | 1–2 | 1–3 | | 0–1 | 2–0 | 0–0 | 1–1 | 0–1 | 0–0 | 1–1 | 1–0 | 0–3 | 1–1 | 2–2 |
| Dunav Ruse | 4–1 | 3–3 | 1–0 | 1–2 | 1–1 | | 0–0 | 1–1 | 0–0 | 3–1 | 2–2 | 2–0 | 1–1 | 2–1 | 1–2 | 2–0 |
| Himik Dimitrovgrad | 1–1 | 3–4 | 1–1 | 0–4 | 0–0 | 2–1 | | 1–2 | 1–0 | 2–1 | 0–0 | 2–3 | 3–1 | 4–3 | 1–0 | 2–3 |
| Levski Sofia | 1–1 | 1–2 | 1–1 | 3–2 | 0–0 | 4–1 | 3–0 | | 3–0 | 1–1 | 2–2 | 0–0 | 4–0 | 0–1 | 2–1 | 0–0 |
| Lokomotiv Plovdiv | 4–0 | 0–4 | 1–0 | 0–0 | 3–1 | 4–0 | 2–1 | 3–2 | | 0–0 | 3–1 | 1–1 | 1–1 | 1–2 | 1–0 | 3–2 |
| Lokomotiv Sofia | 3–2 | 2–1 | 1–0 | 3–1 | 4–1 | 1–1 | 2–1 | 1–1 | 1–1 | | 1–1 | 1–1 | 2–0 | 1–0 | 1–1 | 6–0 |
| Marek Dupnitsa | 3–1 | 3–3 | 1–0 | 0–2 | 2–3 | 1–2 | 0–2 | 0–0 | 2–0 | 2–2 | | 2–1 | 1–0 | 2–1 | 1–0 | 1–0 |
| Slavia Sofia | 4–1 | 0–3 | 1–1 | 0–2 | 3–1 | 0–0 | 2–2 | 2–3 | 2–0 | 1–0 | 3–0 | | 3–3 | 1–3 | 0–1 | 1–0 |
| Spartak Pleven | 2–2 | 1–2 | 0–0 | 0–0 | 0–1 | 0–0 | 1–0 | 3–2 | 4–1 | 2–1 | 2–1 | 3–1 | | 1–2 | 3–0 | 2–0 |
| Spartak Plovdiv | 2–1 | 2–1 | 1–0 | 1–1 | 2–0 | 2–0 | 2–1 | 2–0 | 3–0 | 1–1 | 3–0 | 0–2 | 4–2 | | 3–2 | 2–1 |
| Spartak Sofia | 3–2 | 0–0 | 2–0 | 2–0 | 2–1 | 3–1 | 4–2 | 0–0 | 0–0 | 0–0 | 3–2 | 1–0 | 1–1 | 4–4 | | 1–0 |
| Spartak Varna | 4–0 | 1–0 | 2–0 | 1–1 | 2–1 | 4–2 | 2–1 | 1–1 | 3–1 | 1–0 | 1–1 | 1–0 | 2–3 | 1–2 | 0–1 | |

Source: A PFG (in Bulgarian)
Legend: Blue = home team win; Yellow = draw; Red = away team win.

== Champions ==
Spartak Plovdiv

Goalkeepers
(Bulgaria) Yordan Stankov
(Bulgaria) Vasil Stoynov

Defenders
(Bulgaria) Ivan Ivanov
(Bulgaria) Atanas Manolov
(Bulgaria) Georgi Botev
(Bulgaria) Georgi Statev
(Bulgaria) Tobiya Momin

Midfielders
(Bulgaria) Dimitar Dimov
(Bulgaria) Stefan Todorov
(Bulgaria) Tsvetan Stoynov
(Bulgaria) Bozhidar Mitkov

Forwards
(Bulgaria) Georgi Lazarov
(Bulgaria) Mihail Dushev
(Bulgaria) Atanas Hari Georgiev
(Bulgaria) Hristo Dishkov
(Bulgaria) Dimitar Genov
(Bulgaria) Todor Diev

Manager
| (Bulgaria) Dimitar Baykushev |

== Top scorers ==
| Rank | Scorer | Club | Goals |
|---|---|---|---|
| 1 | (Bulgaria) Todor Diev | Spartak Plovdiv | 26 |
| 2 | (Bulgaria) Georgi Asparuhov | Botev Plovdiv | 20 |
| 3 | (Bulgaria) Nikola Tsanev | CSKA Sofia | 16 |
| 3 | (Bulgaria) Aleksandar Vasilev | Slavia Sofia | 16 |
| 3 | (Bulgaria) Nikola Yordanov | Dunav Ruse | 16 |
