= Hristo Telkiyski =

Bulgarian footballer

Personal information
- Date of birth: 7 July 1979 (age 47)
- Place of birth: Plovdiv, Bulgaria
- Height: 1.81 m (5 ft 11 1/2 in)
- Position: Midfielder

Team information
- Current team: Atletik Kuklen (manager)

Senior career*
Years	Team	Apps	(Gls)
1997–2002	Lokomotiv Plovdiv	61	(0)
2002–2003	PAS Giannina	16	(0)
2003–2004	Akratitos	21	(1)
2004–2006	Kallithea	37	(1)
2006	Panachaiki	12	(1)
2006–2007	Proodeftiki	25	(0)
2007–2008	AEP Paphos		
2008–2009	Fostiras	21	(1)
2009–2011	Trikala	48	(1)
2011	Iraklis Psachna	6	(0)
2012	Botev Plovdiv	4	(0)
2012–2014	Rakovski	46	(1)
- * Club domestic league appearances and goals

Hristo Telkiyski (Bulgarian: Христо Телкийски; born 7 July 1979) is a former Bulgarian football player who played as a midfielder.

== Career ==
Born in Plovdiv, Telkiyski started his professional career at Lokomotiv Plovdiv and earned 61 appearances, before transferred to Greece. He made his A PFG debut on November 9, 1997, in a 0–5 home loss against Levski Sofia.

After the 2001–2002 season, Telkiyski was signed by Greek side PAS Giannina. Following the relegation of PAS Giannina to the Beta Ethniki in summer 2003, Telkiyski joined Akratitos. In 2003–04, Telkiyski appeared 21 times for the club of Peristeri and scored for first time in the Alpha Ethniki. On 30 November 2003 he scored goal in a 1–2 away loss against Iraklis.

Telkiyski would spend the next 1.5 seasons with Alpha Ethniki side Kallithea F.C. before joining second division Panachaiki in January 2006. He joined Proodeftiki F.C. in the following season and then moved to Cyprus to play for second division AEP Paphos F.C. for one season. He returned to Greece to play in the third division with Fostiras F.C., Trikala F.C. and Iraklis Psachna F.C.

On 4 January 2012, Telkiyski joined Botev Plovdiv.
