= FC Atletik Kuklen =

Bulgarian football club

Atletik Kuklen
- Nickname: The Basques of Kuklen
- Founded: 1927; 99 years ago
- Ground: Atletik Stadium
- Capacity: 1,000
- Head coach: Hristo Telkiyski
- League: South-West Third League
- 2025–26: South-West Third League, 14th
Home colours	Away colours

Atletik Kuklen (Bulgarian: Атлетик Куклен) is a Bulgarian football club based in Kuklen, Plovdiv Province, that currently plays in the South-West Third League, the third tier of Bulgarian football. It was founded in 1927.

The club's nickname is The Basques of Kuklen, in reference to the Spanish football club Athletic Bilbao, who are from the Basque Country.

== Current squad ==
As of 1 March 2020

Note: Flags indicate national team as defined under FIFA eligibility rules; some limited exceptions apply. Players may hold more than one non-FIFA nationality.

No.	Pos.	Nation	Player
1	GK	BUL	Dimitar Georgiev
5	DF	BUL	Yanko Gyuzlev
6	MF	BUL	Yalmaz Syuleyman
7	MF	BUL	Angel Semerdzhiev
9	FW	BUL	Andrey Atanasov
10	MF	BUL	Martin Apostolov
11	FW	BUL	Ivan Angelov
13	DF	BUL	Aleksandar Hristev
14	DF	BUL	Boris Biserov
15	DF	BUL	Emil Argirov
16	MF	BUL	Petar Shopov

No.	Pos.	Nation	Player
17	MF	BUL	Dobrin Orlovski
18	FW	BUL	Olgin Choban
19	DF	BUL	Vasil Ivanov
20	MF	BUL	Stefan Tinkov
22	DF	BUL	Atanas Chernev
25	DF	BUL	Yuliyan Romanov (captain)
30	FW	BUL	Dimitar Dzhondzhorov
53	DF	BUL	Ivan Karaivanov
69	GK	BUL	Kiril Akalski
77	MF	BUL	Miroslav Manev
91	MF	BUL	Nikola Nikolov
