= Emil Argirov =

Bulgarian footballer

Personal information
- Full name: Emil Georgiev Argirov
- Date of birth: 4 March 1987 (age 39)
- Place of birth: Plovdiv, Bulgaria
- Height: 1.76 m (5 ft 9 1/2 in)
- Position: Right back

Team information
- Current team: Atletik Kuklen
- Number: 15

Senior career*
Years	Team	Apps	(Gls)
2006–2010	Spartak Plovdiv	92	(13)
2010	Lokomotiv Plovdiv	3	(0)
2011–2012	Botev Plovdiv	14	(1)
2012–2013	Rakovski	20	(0)
2013	Oborishte	6	(1)
2014	Lyubimets 2007	12	(0)
2014–2016	Rakovski	3	(0)
2016–2017	Sokol Markovo	?	(?)
2017–2019	Sadovo	?	(?)
2019–	Atletik Kuklen	0	(0)
- * Club domestic league appearances and goals as of 1 August 2019

Emil Argirov (Bulgarian: Емил Аргиров; born 4 March 1987 in Plovdiv) is a Bulgarian footballer currently playing for Atletik Kuklen as a defender. He is called The Animal by the fans.

== Career ==
=== Spartak Plovdiv ===
Argirov started training his football abilities in FC Spartak Plovdiv's youth academy. In 2006, Emil started playing for the first team. He became an irreplaceable part of the right zone of the defense of his team.

=== Lokomotiv Plovdiv ===
On 26 May 2010, Emil signed for two years with Lokomotiv Plovdiv.

== Club career statistics ==
These statistics include domestic league, domestic cup and European tournaments.

Season	Team	Country	Division	Apps	Goals
2010-11	Loko Plovdiv	Bulgaria	1	3	0
2009–10	Spartak Plovdiv	Bulgaria	2	20	5
2008–09	Spartak Plovdiv	Bulgaria	2	23	2
2007–08	Spartak Plovdiv	Bulgaria	2	17	3
2006–07	Spartak Plovdiv	Bulgaria	2	22	3

Last update: 26 May 2010
