= Dobrin Orlovski =

Bulgarian footballer

Personal information
- Date of birth: 22 August 1981 (age 45)
- Place of birth: Plovdiv, Bulgaria
- Height: 1.82 m (6 ft 0 in)
- Position: Midfielder

Team information
- Current team: Atletik Kuklen
- Number: 23

Youth career
- Lokomotiv Plovdiv

Senior career*
Years	Team	Apps	(Gls)
2000–2003	Lokomotiv Plovdiv	28	(6)
2003	→ Sokol (loan)	14	(4)
2004	Vihren Sandanski	28	(14)
2005	Lokomotiv Plovdiv	4	(0)
2005	Belasitsa Petrich	12	(1)
2006	Lokomotiv Plovdiv	6	(0)
2007–2008	Belasitsa Petrich	35	(1)
2009	Botev Plovdiv	13	(2)
2009–2010	Spartak Plovdiv	20	(2)
2010–2012	Nesebar	40	(6)
2012	Rakovski	5	(1)
2013	Oborishte	0	(0)
2014	Gigant Saedinenie	?	(?)
2014–2015	Rakovski	8	(0)
2015	Scarborough SC		
2016	Gigant Saedinenie		
2016–2017	Scarborough SC		
2017–2018	Gigant Saedinenie		
2019–	Atletik Kuklen		

International career
2002	Bulgaria U21		
- * Club domestic league appearances and goals as of 8 December 2014

Dobrin Orlovski (Bulgarian: Добрин Орловски; born 22 August 1981) is a Bulgarian footballer who currently plays for Atletik Kuklen as a midfielder.

In 2002, he was a member of Bulgaria national under-21 football team.

== Playing career ==
Orlovski began his career with PFC Lokomotiv Plovdiv in the A Group. During his time in the A Group he played with PFC Botev Plovdiv, Belasitsa Petrich, and Vihren Sandanski. For the remainder of his career in Bulgaria he spent time with FC Spartak Plovdiv, OFC Nesebar, POFC Rakovski, FC Oborishte, and FC Gigant Saedinenie in the B Grupa. In 2015, he went overseas to Canada to sign with expansion franchise Scarborough SC of the Canadian Soccer League.

== Managerial career ==
In 2023, he was named the youth coach for Lokomotiv Plovdiv.
