= Dejan Bogunović =

Serbian footballer

Personal information
- Full name: Dejan Bogunović
- Date of birth: 13 May 1981 (age 45)
- Place of birth: Novi Sad, SFR Yugoslavia
- Height: 1.92 m (6 ft 4 in)
- Position: Goalkeeper

Youth career
- Novi Sad

Senior career*
Years	Team	Apps	(Gls)
1998–2001	Vojvodina	1	(0)
2000–2001	→ Kabel (loan)		
2001–2005	Novi Sad	145	(0)
2006–2007	Maritzburg United	17	(0)
2008–2010	Banat Zrenjanin	27	(0)
2010–2011	Metalac Gornji Milanovac	27	(0)
2011–2012	Proleter Novi Sad	32	(0)
2012–2013	Bačka Palanka		
2013–2014	Banat Zrenjanin	16	(0)
2014–2015	Borac Novi Sad		
2016–2017	Hajduk Čurug	18	(0)
2017	Proleter Novi Sad	0	(0)
Total		282	(0)

International career
2002	FR Yugoslavia U21	1	(0)
- * Club domestic league appearances and goals

Dejan Bogunović (Serbian Cyrillic: Дејан Богуновић; born 13 May 1981) is a Serbian former professional footballer who played as a goalkeeper. He is the older brother of fellow footballer Saša Bogunović.

== Club career ==
Bogunović started out at his hometown club Novi Sad, before transferring to Vojvodina in the summer of 1998. He returned to Novi Sad after three years, making close to 150 appearances in the second tier between 2001 and 2005.

== International career ==
In 2002, Bogunović was capped for FR Yugoslavia at under-21 level, coming on as a substitute for Nenad Erić in a friendly loss to France U21.
