= Todor Diev =

Bulgarian footballer (1934–1995)

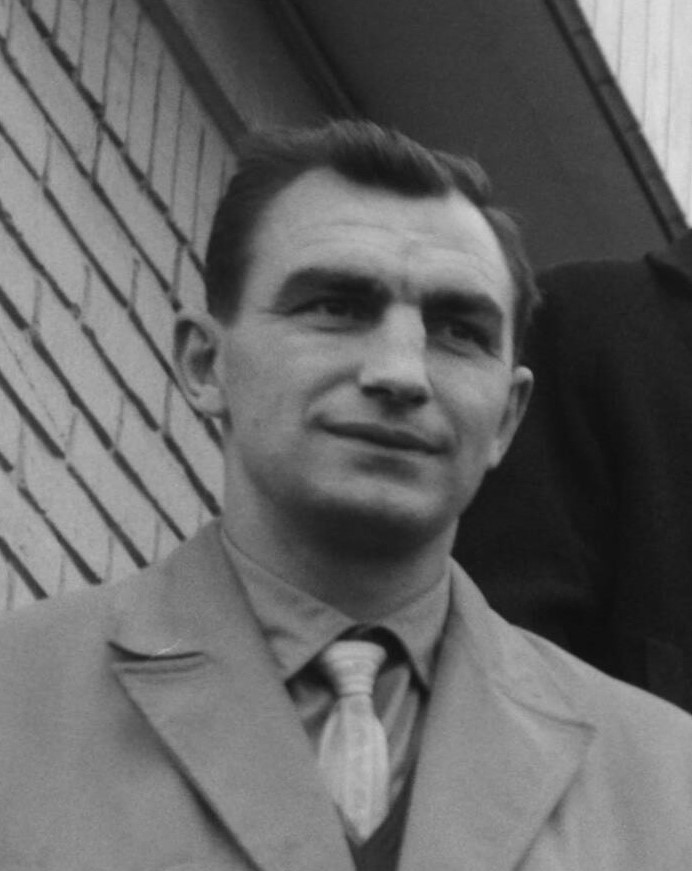
- Diev in 1963

Personal information
- Full name: Todor Nedyalkov Diev
- Date of birth: 28 January 1934
- Place of birth: Plovdiv, Kingdom of Bulgaria
- Date of death: 6 January 1995 (aged 60)
- Place of death: Plovdiv, Bulgaria
- Positions: Forward; winger

Senior career*
| Years | Team | Apps | (Gls) |
| 1950–1952 | Spartak Plovdiv | | |
| 1952–1953 | Spartak Sofia | | |
| 1953–1966 | Spartak Plovdiv | | |
| Total | | 308 | (146) |

International career^{‡}
| 1955–1965 | Bulgaria | 55 | (16) |
Medal record
Men's Football
Representing Bulgaria
| Bronze medal – third place | 1956 Melbourne | Team competition |
- * Club domestic league appearances and goals as of 22 November 2012 ‡ National team caps and goals as of 22 November 2012

Todor Nedyalkov Diev (Bulgarian: Тодор Недялков Диев; 28 January 1934 – 6 January 1995) was a Bulgarian footballer, part of the Bulgarian squad that won the bronze medals in the 1956 Summer Olympics in Melbourne.

== Career ==
Diev began his career at the local Spartak Plovdiv. He made his professional debut in 1950 and since then he played in 308 matches and scored 146 goals. He had a brief period in Spartak Sofia in 1952–1953. He won the Bulgarian A Professional Football Group in 1963 and the Soviet Army Cup in 1958. Diev was crowned as championship top scorer for three times in 1955, 1962 and 1963. He is one of the legends of Spartak Plovdiv. He was recognized as all-time best player of the club.

Todor made his international debut on 13 November 1955, when he scored a goal against Czechoslovakia in a 3–0 win in Sofia. He was capped 55 times for Bulgaria national team and scored 16 goals. Diev played for the team in 1962 FIFA World Cup in Chile and won a bronze medal in the 1956 Summer Olympics in Melbourne. His most remarkable goal was against Brazil on 18 May 1958 at Estádio do Morumbi. After the match, he received an offer for transfer to a Brazilian club, but he refused. Diev was the national team's captain from 20 December 1964 until his retirement. His last international match was against Belgium on 27 October 1965, Bulgaria lost 5–0 in Brussels.

== Honours ==
Spartak Plovdiv (1953–1966)

- Bulgarian A PFG: 1962–63
- Soviet Army Cup: 1958

Bulgaria (1955–1965)

- Summer Olympics Tournament Bronze Medal: 1956

Individual

- A RFG top goalscorer: 1955, 1962–63
- Honored Master of Sports: 1960
