= Artashes Adamyan =

Armenian football manager

Personal information
- Full name: Artashes Armoevich Adamyan
- Date of birth: 12 November 1970 (age 55)
- Place of birth: Armenia
- Position: Midfielder

Senior career*
| Years | Team | Apps | (Gls) |
| 1987 | Armavir | 2 | (0) |
| 1987–1989 | Lernayin Artsakh | 77 | (13) |
| 1989–1991 | Kotayk | 55 | (4) |
| 1991 | Ararat | 12 | (1) |
| 1992 | Kotayk | 29 | (12) |
| 1993–1996 | Spartak (Plovdiv) | 48+ | (3+) |
| 1997–1998 | Kristall | 66 | (5) |
| 1999 | BKMA | 7 | (1) |
| 1999–2001 | Salam Zgharta | | |
| 2001–2002 | Akhaa Ahli Aley | | |
| 2003–2006 | Mika | 89 | (6) |

International career
| 1992–1999 | Armenia | 9 | (0) |

Managerial career
- 2021–: Lernayin Artsakh
- Artsakh
- * Club domestic league appearances and goals

Artashes Armoevich Adamyan (Armenian: Արտաշես Ադամյան; Russian: Арташес Армоевич Адамян; born 12 November 1970) is an Armenian football manager who manages Lernayin Artsakh and Artsakh.

== Career ==
=== Playing career ===
Adamysan started his career with Soviet third-tier side Armavir. In 1989, he signed for Kotayk in the Soviet second tier. In 1991, Adamyan signed for Soviet top flight club Ararat. In 1993, he signed for Spartak (Plovdiv) in the Bulgarian second tier, helping them earn promotion to the Bulgarian top flight. Before the 1997 season, he signed for Russian team Kristall but left due to being caught using stimulants after a game between Armenia and Ukraine.

Before the 1999 season, Adamyan signed for BKMA in Armenia. In 1999, he signed for Lebanese outfit Salam Zgharta. Before the 2003 season, he signed for Mika in Armenia.

He played in the Armenia national team's first ever game.

=== Managerial career ===
He worked as youth director of Russian side Kuban.

In 2021, Adamyan was appointed manager of Armenian second-tier side Lernayin Artsakh, helping them earn promotion to the Armenian top flight. After that, he was appointed manager of Artsakh.
