= Krasimir Dimitrov =

Bulgarian footballer (born 1971)

Personal information
- Full name: Krasimir Dimitrov
- Date of birth: 5 November 1971 (age 54)
- Place of birth: Plovdiv, Bulgaria
- Height: 1.82 m (6 ft 0 in)
- Position: Midfielder

Youth career
- Maritsa Plovdiv

Senior career*
| Years | Team | Apps | (Gls) |
| 1990–1992 | Maritsa Plovdiv | | |
| 1992–1995 | Botev Plovdiv | 47 | (5) |
| 1995–1998 | Naftex Burgas | 40 | (5) |
| 1998–2000 | Levski Sofia | 41 | (0) |
| 2000–2001 | Botev Plovdiv | 11 | (3) |
| 2001–2002 | Marek Dupnitsa | 38 | (2) |
| 2002–2008 | Lokomotiv Plovdiv | 135 | (2) |
| 2008 | Rodopa Smolyan | | |
| 2009 | Brestnik 1948 | | |
| 2009 | Hebar Pazardzhik | | |
- * Club domestic league appearances and goals

Krasimir Dimitrov (Bulgarian: Красимир Димитров; born 5 November 1971) is a former Bulgarian footballer, who played as a midfielder.

== Career ==
Dimitrov previously played for PFC Lokomotiv Plovdiv in the A PFG and is fondly remembered by the Plovdiv fans, as he used to be an influential player and captain of the team.

== Honours ==
=== Club ===
Neftochimic Burgas

- Cup of Professional Football League (2): 1996, 1997

Levski Sofia

- A Group: 1999–00
- Bulgarian Cup: 2000

Lokomotiv Plovdiv

- A Group: 2003–04
- Bulgarian Supercup: 2004
