= Todor Yonov =

Bulgarian footballer

Personal information
- Date of birth: May 11, 1976 (age 50)
- Place of birth: Plovdiv, Bulgaria
- Height: 1.81 m (5 ft 11 1/2 in)
- Position: Defender

Team information
- Current team: 1. SC Znojmo
- Number: 3

Youth career
- 1985–1994: Lokomotiv Plovdiv

Senior career*
Years	Team	Apps	(Gls)
2000–2002	Lokomotiv Plovdiv	26	(1)
2001–2002	→ Beroe (loan)	26	(1)
2002–2003	Rodopa Smolyan		
2004	Makedonska slava		
2004	Nesebar	11	(0)
2005–	1. SC Znojmo	92	(10)
- * Club domestic league appearances and goals as of 7 November 2013

Todor Yonov (Bulgarian: Тодор Йонов; born 11 May 1976 in Plovdiv) is a Bulgarian footballer who plays for and captains 1.SC Znojmo in the Czech Gambrinus Liga.

== Career ==
=== In Bulgaria ===
Born in Plovdiv, Yonov is a product of the Lokomotiv Plovdiv youth teams, but failed to establish himself within the first team. Then he spent six years in the lower divisions with Maritsa-Iztok Radnevo, Dimitrovgrad, Botev Galabovo and Beroe 2000 Kazanlak, before returned to Lokomotiv in 2000.

Yonov made his debut for Lokomotiv Plovdiv on 5 August 2000 in a 3–1 loss against Marek Dupnitsa. He made 26 appearances in the Bulgarian B Group during the 2000–01 season, scoring one goal.

In June 2001, Yonov joined Beroe Stara Zagora on a season-long loan deal. After a loan spell at Beroe he moved on to play for Rodopa Smolyan, with whom he won promotion to the A PFG in May 2003.

On 28 July 2004, Yonov signed for newly promoted A PFG side Nesebar. He made his debut on 14 August in a 2–0 home win over Rodopa Smolyan.

=== Znojmo ===
In January 2005, Yonov signed for Czech club 1. SC Znojmo. In December 2009, Yonov was named Znojmo Sports Person of the Year. He became an integral part of the Znojmo side, captaining the team in their promotions to the Czech 2. Liga in 2010 and to the Gambrinus Liga in 2013.

Yonov made his Gambrinus Liga debut against Dukla Prague on 19 July 2013, aged 37, playing the full 90 minutes.
