= Saša Bogunović =

Serbian footballer (born 1982)

Personal information
- Full name: Saša Bogunović
- Date of birth: 16 December 1982 (age 43)
- Place of birth: Novi Sad, SFR Yugoslavia
- Height: 1.84 m (6 ft 0 in)
- Position: Striker

Senior career*
Years	Team	Apps	(Gls)
2001–2005	Novi Sad	127	(48)
2003	→ Litex Lovech (loan)	8	(0)
2006	Zalaegerszeg	12	(1)
2006–2008	Widzew Łódź	34	(6)
2008–2011	Novi Sad	74	(24)
2011–2012	Proleter Novi Sad	28	(7)
2012–2013	Novi Sad	16	(1)
2013	Banat Zrenjanin		
2014	Roi Et United		
2015–2016	Hajduk Čurug	13	(1)
Total		312	(88)
- * Club domestic league appearances and goals

Saša Bogunović (Serbian Cyrillic: Саша Богуновић; born 16 December 1982) is a Serbian former professional footballer who played as a striker. He is the younger brother of fellow footballer Dejan Bogunović.

== Career ==
Bogunović started out at his hometown club Novi Sad. He scored 11 goals in the 2001–02 Second League of FR Yugoslavia, as the team placed third in Group North. In early 2003, Bogunović moved on loan to Bulgarian club Litex Lovech until the end of the season. He came on as a substitute in the 2003 Bulgarian Cup final, as the team lost 2–1 to Levski Sofia.

In early 2006, Bogunović moved abroad for the second time and joined Hungarian club Zalaegerszeg. He spent the next two seasons with Polish side Widzew Łódź, before returning to his parent club Novi Sad in the summer of 2008.
