= Todor Simeonov =

Bulgarian footballer

Personal information
- Full name: Todor Georgiev Simeonov
- Date of birth: 17 February 1976 (age 50)
- Place of birth: Plovdiv, Bulgaria
- Height: 1.80 m (5 ft 11 in)
- Position: Defender

Youth career
- 1984–1994: Arda

Senior career*
Years	Team	Apps	(Gls)
1995	Arda	8	(0)
1996	Chirpan	12	(1)
1996–1998	Botev Plovdiv	44	(2)
1998–1999	Maritsa Plovdiv	27	(2)
1999–2001	Botev Plovdiv	38	(2)
2001–2003	Slavia Sofia	31	(3)
2003–2004	Valletta F.C.	26	(2)
2004–2006	Rodopa Smolyan	51	(3)
2006–2011	Spartak Plovdiv	101	(1)
- * Club domestic league appearances and goals

Todor Simeonov (Bulgarian: Тодор Симеонов; born 17 February 1976) is a Bulgarian former professional footballer who played as a defender.
