= Dimitar Dimov (footballer) =

Bulgarian football defender (1937–2008)

Personal information
- Full name: Dimitar Dimov Penchev
- Date of birth: 13 December 1937
- Place of birth: Plovdiv, Bulgaria
- Date of death: 25 May 2008 (aged 70)
- Positions: Defender; midfielder

Senior career*
| Years | Team | Apps | (Gls) |
| 1955–1967 | Spartak Plovdiv | 255 | (8) |
| 1967–1969 | Dobrudzha Dobrich | 41 | (1) |
| Total | | 296 | (9) |

International career
| 1959–1962 | Bulgaria | 8 | (0) |
- * Club domestic league appearances and goals

Dimitar Dimov Penchev (Bulgarian: Димитьр Димов Пенчев) (13 December 1937 – 25 May 2008) was a Bulgarian football defender who played for Bulgaria in the 1962 FIFA World Cup. He also played for FC Spartak Plovdiv. Dimov died on 25 May 2008, at the age of 70.
