= Dimitar Ivankov =

Bulgarian footballer

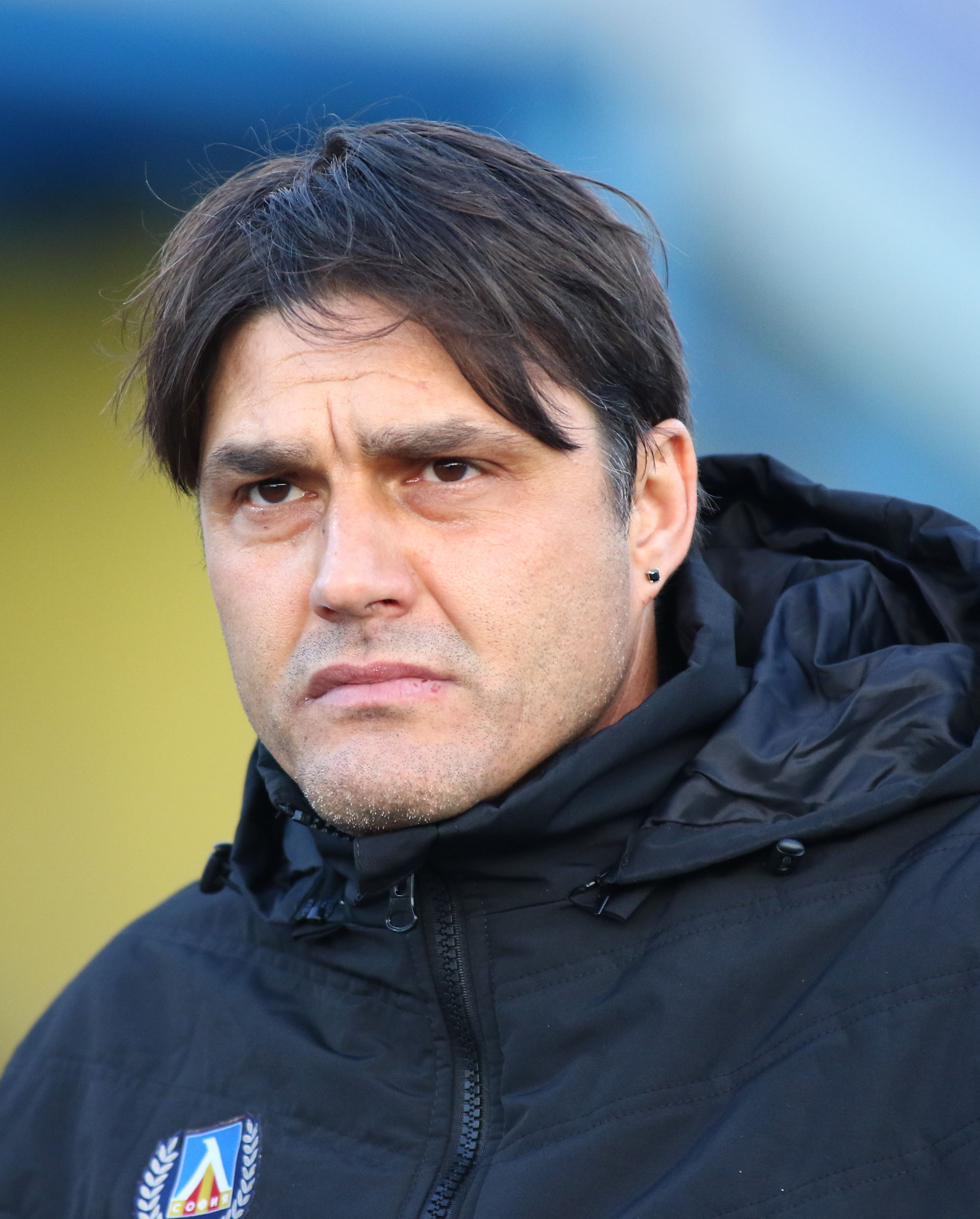
- Ivankov with Levski Sofia in 2019

Personal information
- Full name: Dimitar Ivanov Ivankov
- Date of birth: 30 October 1975 (age 50)
- Place of birth: Sofia, Bulgaria
- Height: 1.88 m (6 ft 2 in)
- Position: Goalkeeper

Youth career
- Levski Sofia

Senior career*
Years	Team	Apps	(Gls)
1996–2005	Levski Sofia	203	(18)
2005–2008	Kayserispor	94	(6)
2008–2011	Bursaspor	90	(6)
2011	Anorthosis Famagusta	0	(0)
Total		387	(30)

International career
1998–2010	Bulgaria	64	(0)

Managerial career
- 2019: Levski Sofia (goalkeeping coach)
- 2021: Levski Sofia (goalkeeping coach)
- * Club domestic league appearances and goals

Dimitar Ivanov Ivankov (Bulgarian: Димитър Иванов Иванков; born 30 October 1975) is a former Bulgarian professional footballer who played as a goalkeeper. However, he is known for his goals, especially from converting penalty kicks. Ivankov is the sixth highest goalscoring goalkeeper of all time with 42 goals, and Number 1 in Europe under this indicator.

== Club career ==
Born in Sofia, Ivankov was raised in Levski Sofia's youth teams and is a passionate fan of the "bluemen". For nine seasons he played in 275 matches and scored 25 goals. Ivankov was a champion of Bulgaria in 2000, 2001 and 2002 and the national cup winner for 1998, 2000, 2002, 2003 and 2005.

He joined Turkish club Kayserispor in June 2005. On 7 May 2008 he played a vital role in Kayseri winning the Turkish Cup, saving 3 penalties and scoring two himself. Thus, he became the fourth Bulgarian to win the Turkish Cup.

During three seasons with the club Ivankov earned 94 appearances playing in the Süper Lig, and scored six goals.

On 9 June 2008 he signed a contract with Bursaspor. He scored a crucial goal against Fenerbahçe in the 95th minute. His goal made the game 2–1 to Bursapor.

In 2010, he scored the 42nd senior goal of his career, putting him in third place for the most goals scored by goalkeepers worldwide. He won the Turkish Süper Lig with Bursaspor in 2010.

On 23 June 2011, Ivankov signed a contract with Cypriot First Division side Anorthosis Famagusta. The contract with Anorthosis was terminated by mutual agreement on 8 August, after the team's Europa League exit.

== International career ==
Ivankov earned his first cap with Bulgaria in 1998 and has since earned 64 caps for his country. He was part of the Bulgarian squad at Euro 2004 in Portugal, but he did not play any single match in the competition as Zdravko Zdravkov was still at best performances in club and as number one of the Bulgarian national team. After Euro 2004 Ivankov was the first choice for goalkeeper for the Bulgarian team. On 3 March 2010, he played his last match for the national team in a friendly against Poland.

== Honours ==
Levski Sofia

- Bulgarian A Group: 1999–2000, 2000–01, 2001–02
- Bulgarian Cup: 1997–98, 1999–2000, 2001–02, 2002–03, 2004–05

Kayserispor

- Turkish Cup: 2007–08

Bursaspor

- Süper Lig: 2009–10
