= Velimir Ivanović =

Serbian footballer

Personal information
- Full name: Velimir Ivanović
- Date of birth: 22 November 1978 (age 47)
- Place of birth: Kragujevac, SR Serbia, SFR Yugoslavia
- Height: 1.74 m (5 ft 9 in)
- Position: Midfielder

Youth career
- Radnički Kragujevac

Senior career*
Years	Team	Apps	(Gls)
1996–1999	Radnički Kragujevac	42+	(10+)
1999–2000	Larissa	26	(2)
2000–2001	Partizan	2	(0)
2001	→ Radnički Kragujevac (loan)	15	(1)
2001	Olympiacos Volos	6	(0)
2002–2006	Slavia Sofia	101	(30)
2006	Radnički Kragujevac	10	(0)
2007–2009	Spartak Varna	61	(5)
2009–2010	Minyor Pernik	34	(0)
2011	Dorostol Silistra	9	(1)
2011–2012	Spartak Varna	13	(1)
2012–2013	Svetkavitsa Targovishte	21	(2)
2013–2014	Vidima-Rakovski Sevlievo		
Total		340+	(52+)

International career
2000	FR Yugoslavia U21 (Note: Official UEFA matches only)	1	(0)
- * Club domestic league appearances and goals

Velimir Ivanović (Serbian Cyrillic: Велимир Ивановић; born 22 November 1978) is a Serbian former professional footballer who played as a midfielder.

== Club career ==
After starting out at Radnički Kragujevac, Ivanović was transferred to Greek club Larissa in 1999. He subsequently returned to his homeland and signed a four-year contract with Partizan in 2000. Failing to make an impact in just two league appearances, Ivanović was loaned to his parent club Radnički Kragujevac in the 2001 winter transfer window.

In the 2002 winter transfer window, Ivanović moved to Bulgaria and signed with Slavia Sofia. He spent four and a half seasons with the club, scoring 30 league goals in 101 league appearances.

== International career ==
Ivanović was capped for FR Yugoslavia at under-21 level.
