= Stadion Todor Diev =

Football stadium in Plovdiv, Bulgaria

Coordinates: 42°7′54″N 24°44′37″E

Todor Diev
- Uhoto, Loftus Road
- Interactive map of Todor Diev
- Full name: Stadion Todor Diev
- Capacity: 3,548

Construction
- Built: 1925–26
- Opened: 1926

Tenants
- Botev Plovdiv (1926–1949); Spartak Plovdiv (1949–present)

Todor Diev Stadium (Bulgarian: Стадион „Тодор Диев“, "Ухото") is a football stadium in Plovdiv, Bulgaria, located in the south urban area of Kichuk Parizh.

The stadium opened in 1926 as a multi-sport venue of the domestic sport giant Botev Plovdiv. In 1949 the stadium was nationalized by the communist authorities and later same year was given to the recently established FC Spartak Plovdiv. The stadium was redeveloped in the period 1982–84. Presently the stadium holds 3,500 people, with more standing room, and continues to be the home ground of Spartak. The stadium is named after Todor Diev, the greatest player in Spartak's history.

The stadium's highest recorded attendance of 11,353 was in a Bulgarian Cup semi-final game against Blagoevgrad`s FC Pirin (0:0) on 27 April 1994.

The stadium is also known as Plovdiv's Loftus Road - a tribute to the English team QPR, which plays in the same hooped kit as Spartak.
