= Nedko Milenov =

Bulgarian footballer

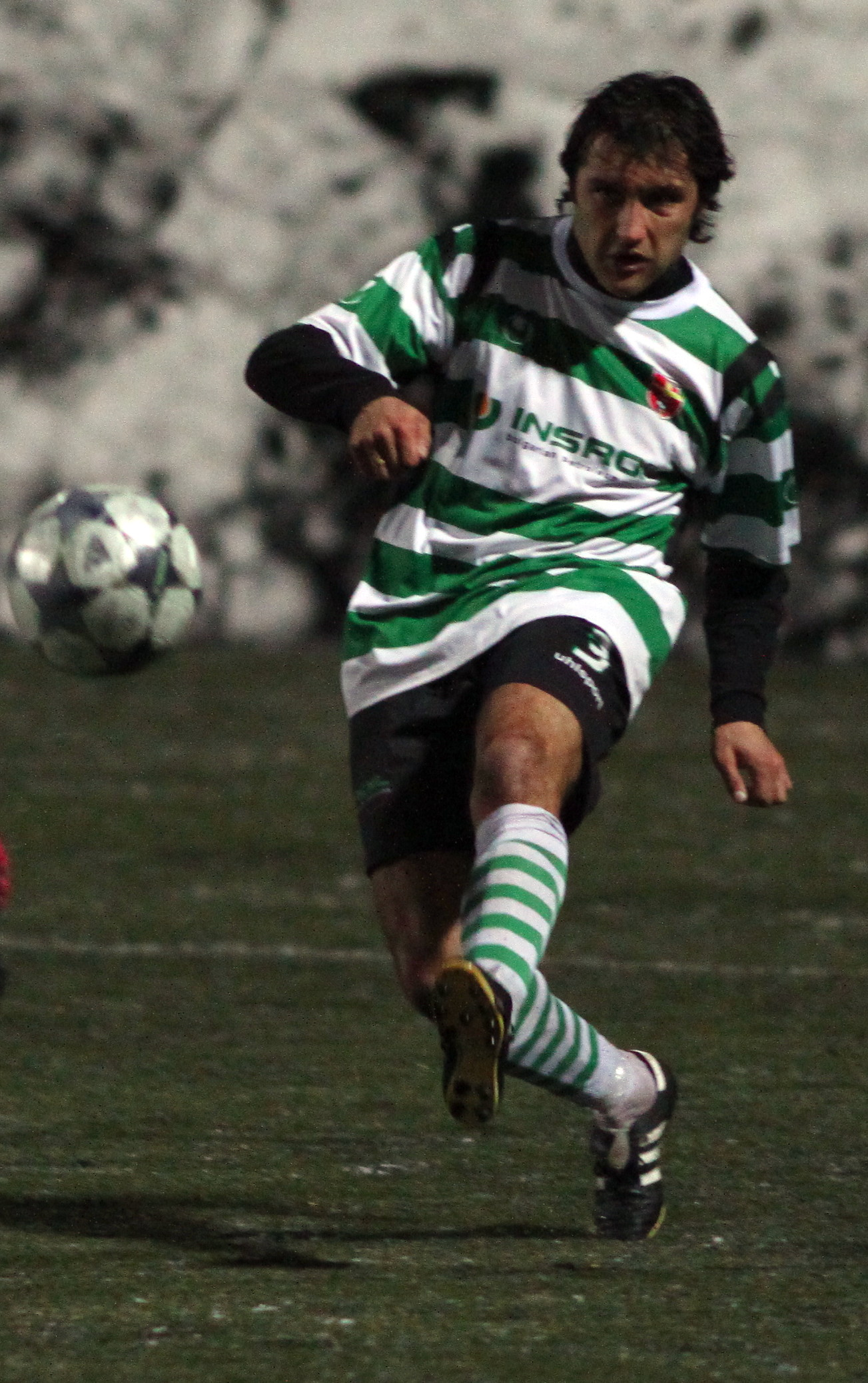

Personal information
- Full name: Nedko Valentinov Milenov
- Date of birth: 9 October 1978 (age 48)
- Place of birth: Velingrad, Bulgaria
- Height: 1.76 m (5 ft 9 in)
- Position: Midfielder

Youth career
- Trakia Zvanichevo

Senior career*
| Years | Team | Apps | (Gls) |
| 1998–2000 | Velbazhd Kyustendil | 36 | (0) |
| 2000–2007 | Botev Plovdiv | 142 | (14) |
| 2007 | Rodopa Smolyan | 8 | (0) |
| 2008 | Beroe | 8 | (0) |
| 2008–2009 | Lyubimets 2007 | 19 | (0) |
| 2009–2010 | Bansko | 26 | (1) |
| 2010 | Botev Plovdiv | 8 | (0) |
| 2011 | Lyubimets 2007 | 5 | (0) |
- * Club domestic league appearances and goals as of 19 January 2011

Nedko Valentinov Milenov (Bulgarian: Недко Валентинов Миленов; born 9 October 1978) is a football midfielder from Bulgaria.

== Career ==
His career started at the little club FC Trakia Zvanichevo. From 1998 to 2000, he played for PFC Velbazhd. He went to PFC Botev Plovdiv on a free transfer in early 2000. Milenov spent several seasons playing for Botev in the A PFG.
