= Stadion Septemvri (Smolyan) =

Coordinates: 41°34′30″N 24°41′57″E

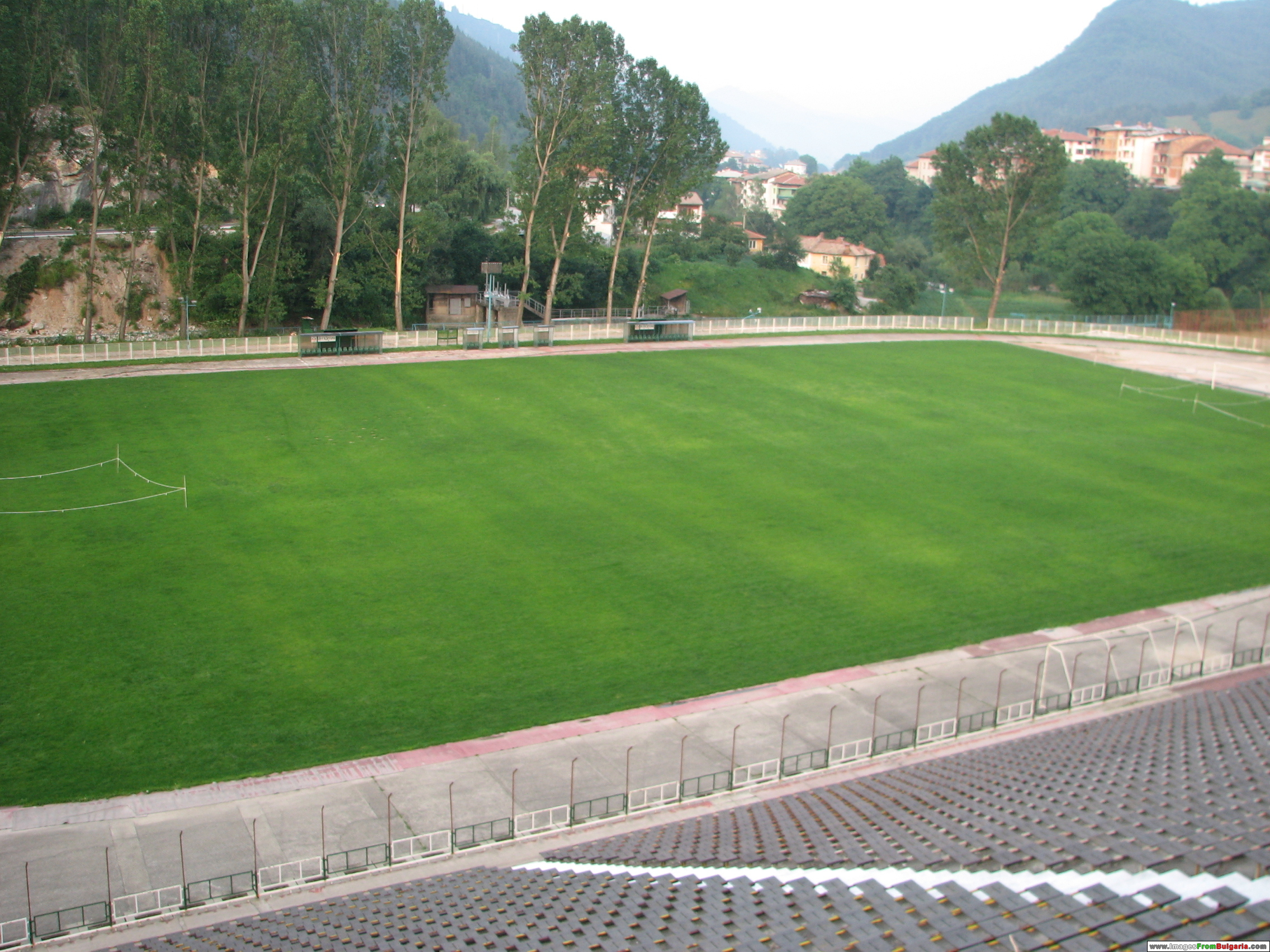
Septemvri Stadium in Smolyan

Septemvri Stadium is a multi-use stadium in Smolyan, Bulgaria. It is currently used mostly for football matches and is the home stadium of Rodopa Smolyan. The stadium holds 6,100 people.
