= 1958 Bulgarian Cup =

Tournament details
- Country: Bulgaria

Final positions
- Champions: Spartak Plovdiv (1st cup)
- Runners-up: Minyor Pernik

The 1958 Bulgarian Cup was the 16th season of the Bulgarian Cup (in this period the tournament was named Cup of the Soviet Army). Spartak Plovdiv won the competition, beating Minyor Pernik 1–0 in the final at the Vasil Levski National Stadium in Sofia.

== First round ==
Team 1	Score	Team 2
Minyor Pernik	3–1	Ludogorets Razgrad
Slavia Sofia	4–2	Dunav Ruse
Spartak Plovdiv	4–1	ATZ Shumen
Spartak Varna	2–1	Litex Lovech
Botev Plovdiv	3–3 (a.e.t.)	Rozova Dolina
Marek Dupnitsa	2–1	Beroe Stara Zagora
Pirin Blagoevgrad	1–0	Lokomotiv Plovdiv
Botev Varna	6–3	Levski Lom
Cherno More Varna	4–1	Arda Kardzhali
Replay
Botev Plovdiv	1–0	Rozova Dolina

== Second round ==
Team 1	Score	Team 2
CSKA Sofia	5–1	FC Tryavna
Slavia Sofia	3–1	Botev Plovdiv
Spartak Plovdiv	2–1	Lokomotiv Sofia
Cherno More Varna	5–1	Spartak Pleven
Spartak Varna	3–0 (w/o)	Pirin Blagoevgrad
Minyor Pernik	10–0	Rodni krile Sofia
Botev Varna	3–0 (w/o)	Pomorie
Levski Sofia	6–2	Marek Dupnitsa

== Quarter-finals ==
Team 1	Score	Team 2
CSKA Sofia	2–1	Spartak Varna
Slavia Sofia	1–4	Spartak Plovdiv
Minyor Pernik	2–1	Cherno More Varna
Levski Sofia	3–0	Botev Varna

== Semi-finals ==
Team 1	Score	Team 2
Minyor Pernik	2–1	Levski Sofia
Spartak Plovdiv	1–0	CSKA Sofia

== Final ==
=== Details ===
7 November 1958

Spartak Plovdiv	1−0	Minyor Pernik
Dushev 60'

Vasil Levski National Stadium, Sofia
Attendance: 20,000
Referee: Georgi Hristov (Sofia)

Spartak	Minyor
