= Georgi Stoychev =

Bulgarian footballer

Personal information
- Full name: Georgi Ivanov Stoychev
- Date of birth: 3 July 1977 (age 49)
- Place of birth: Sevlievo, PR Bulgaria
- Height: 1.83 m (6 ft 0 in)
- Position: Defensive midfielder

Youth career
- Vidima-Rakovski

Senior career*
Years	Team	Apps	(Gls)
1996–2015	Vidima-Rakovski	294	(26)
- * Club domestic league appearances and goals as of 17 May 2010

Georgi Stoychev (Bulgarian: Георги Стойчев; born 3 July 1977) is a Bulgarian former football player who played as a midfielder and defender. He spent his entire playing career with PFC Vidima-Rakovski Sevlievo from 1996 to 2015. As of 2017, he was an assistant coach at FC Sevlievo.
