= Stadion Bonchuk =

Sports venue in Bulgaria

Coordinates: 42°16′32″N 23°8′8″E

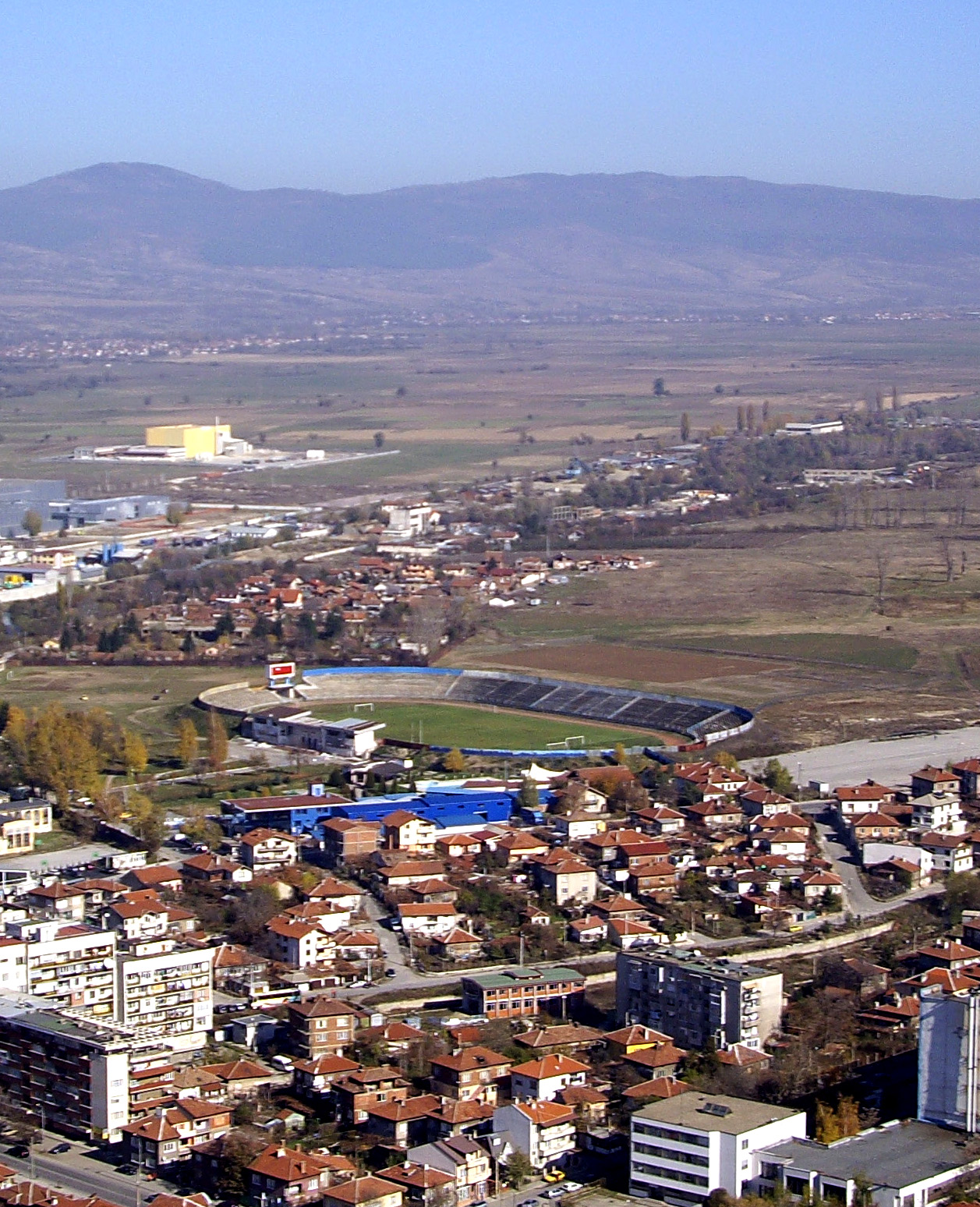
- Interactive map of Stadion Bonchuk
- Location: Dupnitsa, Bulgaria
- Capacity: 16,050

Construction
- Opened: 1952

Tenants
- Marek Dupnitsa

Stadion Bonchuk (Bulgarian: Стадион „Бончук", English: 'Bonchuk Stadium') is a multi-use stadium in Dupnitsa, Bulgaria. It is used mostly for football matches and is the home ground of Marek Dupnitsa. The stadium has a seating capacity for 16,050 people.

Bonchuk stadium is a notable one in Bulgarian football, as it has hosted many notable European teams, including German giants Bayern Munich, Scottish team Aberdeen, and Hungarian powerhouse Ferencvárosi TC. All of these games ended with wins for Marek.

== History ==
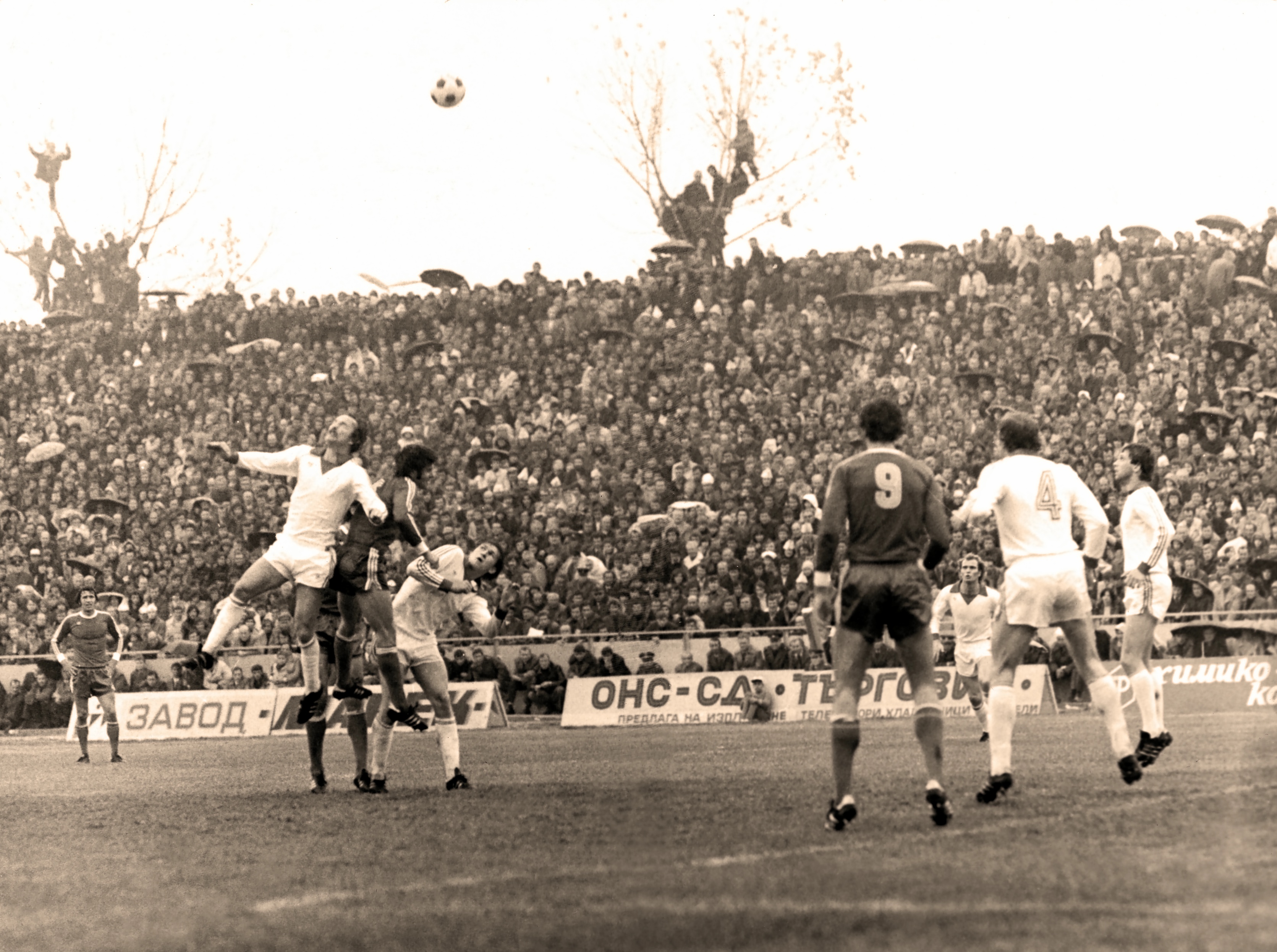
UEFA Cup match between Marek and Bayern Munich in 1977.

Bonchuk Stadium was opened in 1952. Despite the success of the club from Dupnitsa, the stadium was abandoned. In 2014, after the return of "Mareka" to the First League, it was decided to install more seats.
