= Anzhelo Kyuchukov =

Bulgarian footballer

Personal information
- Full name: Anzhelo Aleksandrov Kyuchukov
- Date of birth: 2 October 1972 (age 54)
- Place of birth: Dupnitsa, Bulgaria
- Position: Midfielder

Youth career
- 1982–1990: Marek Dupnitsa

Senior career*
Years	Team	Apps	(Gls)
1990–1998	Marek Dupnitsa	179	(18)
1998–2000	Minyor Pernik	49	(4)
2000–2001	Velbazhd Kyustendil	22	(0)
2001–2002	Lokomotiv Plovdiv	19	(0)
2002–2010	Marek Dupnitsa	119	(5)
Total		388	(27)

Managerial career
- 2009–2010: Marek Dupnitsa
- 2012: Marek Dupnitsa
- 2026: Marek Dupnitsa
- * Club domestic league appearances and goals

Anzhelo Aleksandrov Kyuchukov (Bulgarian: Анжело Александров Кючуков; born 2 October 1972) is a Bulgarian former professional footballer who played as a midfielder.
