= Fábio Lima (footballer, born 1981) =

Brazilian footballer

Personal information
- Full name: Fábio Henrique Lima
- Date of birth: 5 February 1981 (age 45)
- Place of birth: Severínia, Brazil
- Height: 1.82 m (6 ft 0 in)
- Position: Central defender

Team information
- Current team: [aposentado]

Senior career*
Years	Team	Apps	(Gls)
2002–2004	Juventus (SP)		
2003	→ CSKA Sofia (loan)		
2005	Barueri		
2006	Inter de Limeira		
2006	XV de Jaú		
2007	São Bento		
2008	América (SP)		
2008	CSA		
2008	Gloria Buzău	4	(0)
2009	CSA		
2010	Linense		
2011	CSA		
2011	Goiânia		
2011–2012	Linense		
2012	Mirassol		
2013–	Linense		
- * Club domestic league appearances and goals

Fábio Henrique Lima (born 5 February 1981) is a Brazilian footballer. Nowadays, he is retired and coaches the team that aims to achieve its goal in Lins.

== Biography ==
Born in Olímpia, São Paulo state, Lima left for CSKA Sofia in his early career. He then returned to São Paulo state for Juventus (SP), Barueri, Inter de Limeira, XV de Jaú, São Bento and América (SP).

In March 2008, he left for Campeonato Alagoano club CSA and in mid-2008 left for Romanian Liga I club Gloria Buzău.

In December 2008, he returned to CSA and signed a contract until the end of 2009 Campeonato Alagoano. In June, he extended his contract until the end of 2009 Campeonato Brasileiro Série D.

In December 2009 he left for Linense of 2010 Campeonato Paulista Série A2. After winning the champion and promoted back to São Paulo state first level, he extended his contract with club until the end of 2011 Campeonato Paulista.

On 27 December 2010 he signed a 1-year contract with CSA.
