= Ivaylo Kirilov =

Bulgarian footballer

Personal information
- Full name: Ivaylo Plamenov Kirilov
- Date of birth: 16 November 1975 (age 50)
- Place of birth: Ruse, Bulgaria
- Height: 1.69 m (5 ft 6 1/2 in)
- Position: Midfielder

Senior career*
Years	Team	Apps	(Gls)
2001–2004	Marek Dupnitsa	56	(9)
2004–2005	Anagennisi Dherynia		
2005–2011	Dunav Ruse	119	(28)
2011–2012	Dve Mogili	23	(11)
2012–2016	Kubrat 2007	68	(11)
2016–2017	Lokomotiv Ruse	13	(2)
- * Club domestic league appearances and goals as of 15 January 2022

Ivaylo Kirilov (Bulgarian: Ивайло Кирилов) is a Bulgarian former footballer and football manager. He played for FC Dunav Ruse. As of 2018, he was the head coach of FC Lokomotiv Ruse. As of 2022, he was the manager of Dunav.
