= Anatoli Todorov =

Bulgarian footballer

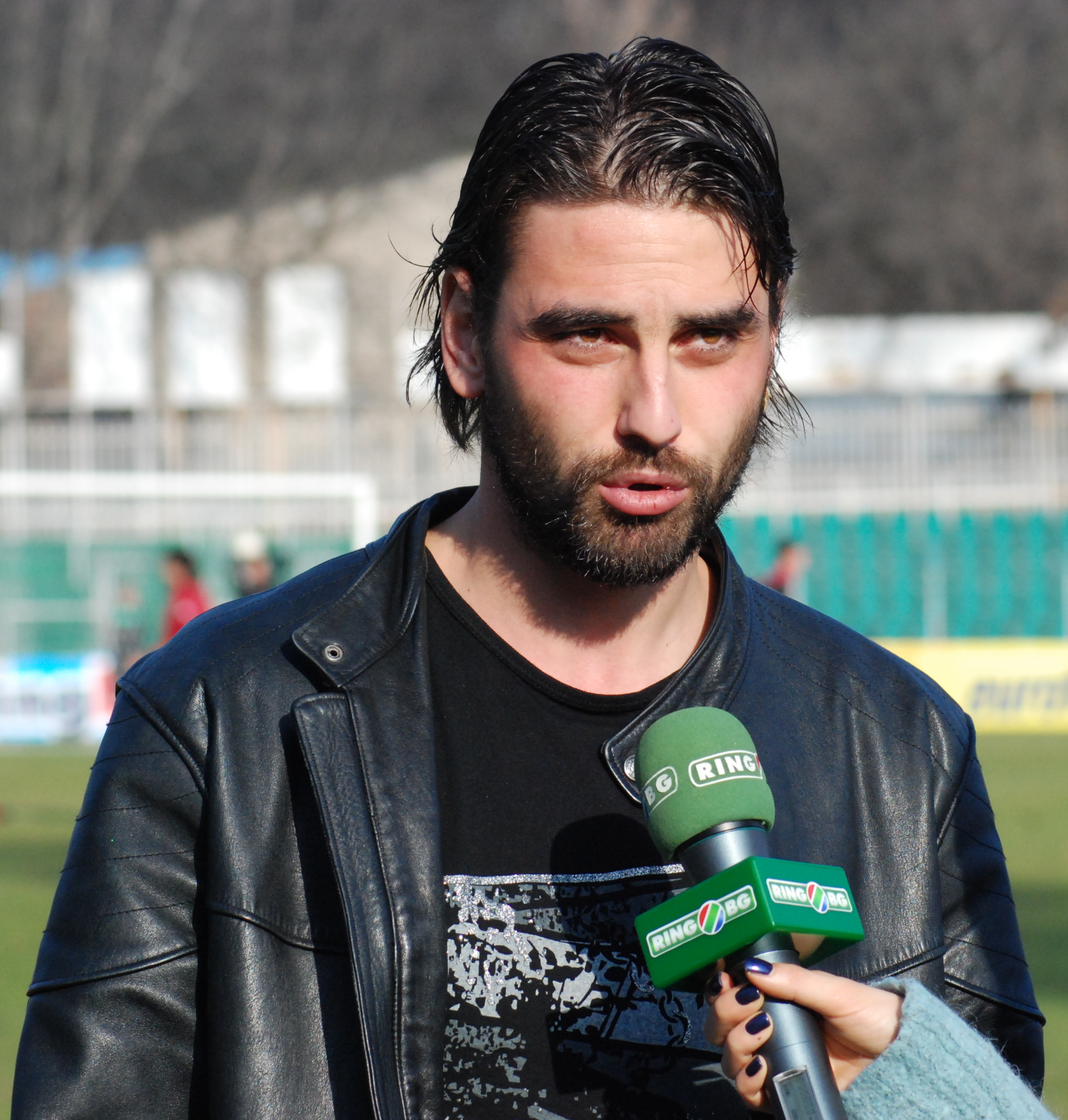

Personal information
- Full name: Anatoli Tonov Todorov
- Date of birth: 24 April 1985 (age 41)
- Place of birth: Sofia, Bulgaria
- Height: 1.82 m (6 ft 0 in)
- Position: Midfielder

Senior career*
Years	Team	Apps	(Gls)
2000–2002	Septemvri Sofia		
2002–2006	Litex Lovech	12	(1)
2004–2005	→ Vidima-Rakovski (loan)	16	(5)
2006–2007	Rodopa Smolyan	29	(12)
2008–2009	Lokomotiv Plovdiv	27	(3)
2009–2010	Lokomotiv Mezdra	16	(0)
2010	Vidima-Rakovski	6	(0)
2011	Brestnik 1948	9	(1)
2012–2014	Vitosha Bistritsa	34	(5)
2014	PFC Burgas	9	(0)
2015	Conegliano German	13	(9)
2015	Septemvri Sofia	10	(3)
2016	Botev Vratsa	11	(4)
2016	Oborishte	9	(1)
2017	Spartak Pleven	0	(0)
2017–2019	Botev Ihtiman	?	(3)
2019–2020	Bdin Vidin	?	(1)
2020–2021	Granit Vladaya	?	(?)
- * Club domestic league appearances and goals

Anatoli Todorov (Bulgarian: Анатоли Тодоров; born 24 April 1985) is a Bulgarian retired football player who played as an offensive midfielder.

== Career ==
His first club was Septemvri Sofia. Aged 17, he signed with Litex Lovech for a fee of 200 000. After being released from Rodopa Smolyan in January 2008, Todorov signed a 3-year deal with Lokomotiv Plovdiv. He has been given the No.17 shirt. Anatoli made his official debut for Lokomotiv in a match against Lokomotiv Sofia on 1 March 2008. The result of which was a 1–2 defeat for Loko Plovdiv. In August 2009 Todorov became part of Lokomotiv Mezdra's squad.

On 19 July 2017, Todorov joined Spartak Pleven.

== Video game ==
He played as a striker in Championship Manager: Season 03/04. He was a striker in that version of game
