= Manuel Mendoza (footballer, born 1976) =

Ecuadorian footballer

Personal information
- Full name: Ramón Manuel Mendoza Intriago
- Date of birth: October 10, 1976 (age 50)
- Place of birth: El Empalme, Ecuador
- Height: 1.70 m (5 ft 7 in)
- Position: Defender

Senior career*
Years	Team	Apps	(Gls)
1996–2001	Emelec		
2001–2002	Deportivo Cuenca		
2002–2003	Levski Sofia	8	(0)
2003–2005	Deportivo Cuenca		
2005	LDU Portoviejo		
2006	Aucas	12	(0)
2007	Deportivo Quito	27	(0)
2008	Deportivo Azogues	15	(1)
2009	Olmedo	15	(0)
- * Club domestic league appearances and goals as of December 23, 2009

Manuel Mendoza (born October 10, 1976) is an Ecuadorian football defender.

== Club career ==
In the 2002–03 season, Mendoza played for the Bulgarian side Levski Sofia, with whom he won the Bulgarian Cup.

Although not scoring a single goal in the Premier League, Mendoza scored in the last minute against the arch-rivals CSKA Sofia in the semi-final of the Bulgarian Cup, giving Levski a 1–0 win and entering Levski's folklore forever. Mendoza is the first Ecuadorian player in Bulgarian football.

After the end of the season, he returned to Deportivo Cuenca and became a champion of Ecuador in 2004.

In Ecuador, Mendoza played also for LDU Portoviejo, SD Aucas, Deportivo Quito, Deportivo Azogues and CD Olmedo.

== Club playing honours ==
Levski Sofia

- Bulgarian Cup: 2003

Deportivo Cuenca

- Ecuadorian Serie A: 2004
