= Desislav Rusev =

Bulgarian footballer

Personal information
- Full name: Desislav Petev Rusev
- Date of birth: 27 April 1979 (age 47)
- Place of birth: Pleven, Bulgaria
- Height: 1.80 m (5 ft 11 in)
- Position: Forward

Team information
- Current team: Vihar Slavyanovo

Senior career*
Years	Team	Apps	(Gls)
2001–2002	Akademik Svishtov	22	(9)
2002–2004	Litex Lovech	21	(4)
2004–2005	Vidima-Rakovski	27	(9)
2005–2007	Rodopa Smolyan	41	(15)
2007	Spartak Varna	0	(0)
2008	Rodopa Smolyan	22	(17)
2009	Vihren Sandanski	30	(9)
2010	Lokomotiv Mezdra	10	(0)
2010	Chernomorets Balchik	12	(2)
2011	Kaliakra Kavarna	13	(0)
2011	Bdin Vidin	8	(1)
2012	Spartak Pleven	12	(4)
2013–2015	Akademik Svishtov	45	(20)
2015–2016	Partizan Cherven Bryag	21	(9)
2016	Litex Lovech	3	(2)
2017–2018	Miziya Knezha	28	(11)
2018–2019	Partizan Cherven Bryag	26	(9)
2019–	Vihar Slavyanovo	0	(0)
- * Club domestic league appearances and goals as of 1 July 2019

Desislav Rusev (Bulgarian: Десислав Русев; born 27 April 1979) is a Bulgarian footballer who plays as a forward for Vihar Slavyanovo.

Rusev previously played for Litex Lovech, Vidima-Rakovski Sevlievo, Rodopa Smolyan and Vihren Sandanski in the A PFG.

== Honours ==
Litex Lovech

- Bulgarian Cup: 2003–04
