= FC Spartak Plovdiv =

Bulgarian football club

Spartak Plovdiv
- Full name: Football Club Spartak 1947 Plovdiv
- Nickname: Гладиаторите (The Gladiators)
- Founded: 15 November 1947; 79 years ago
- Ground: Stadion Todor Diev; Plovdiv, Bulgaria
- Capacity: 3,500
- Chairman: Hristo Danov
- Manager: Atanas Dramov
- League: Southeast Third League
- 2025-26: Southeast Third League, 7th
- Website: https://spartakplovdiv.bg/
Home colours	Away colours	Third colours

FC Spartak Plovdiv (Bulgarian: ФК Спартак Пловдив) is a Bulgarian football club based in Plovdiv, which plays in the third tier of Bulgarian football, the Third League. The club was established in 1947 and folded its senior team in 2016, before being 'refounded' in 2017. Spartak currently plays its home matches at the 3,000-seat Todor Diev Stadium in the Kichuk Parizh district of Plovdiv. The stadium is named after the club's all-time greatest player Todor Diev.

Established in 1947, following the communist takeover in Bulgaria, Spartak was first enrolled in the second tier in 1952, before achieving promotion to the A Group a year later. Spartak has won two major honors, the Bulgarian Cup in 1958 and the league title in 1963. Spartak also participated in the Balkans Cup, where the team has finished as runner-up. The club has played a total of 17 seasons in the top tier A Group, most recently in 1997.

== History ==
Spartak was founded on 15 November 1947, evolving from three earlier Plovdiv clubs – Levski, Septemvri and Udarnik. The club name is a reference to the Roman slave hero Spartacus. This reference also explains the club's nickname – The Gladiators (Bulgarian: Гладиаторите). The first team colours of the club were chosen the same year, and soon Spartak was characterized by a blue, red and white checkers jersey. These colors have remained throughout the club's history, with various patterns used over the years.

The 1950s and 1960s were Spartak's golden age, spending that time in the A PFG. The club won the Bulgarian Cup in 1958, beating Minyor Pernik in the final. This was Spartak's first major trophy in club history. In the 1961–62 season, Spartak finished as runners-up, behind CSKA Sofia. Spartak's greatest success came in 1963, however, when they were crowned champions of Bulgaria for the 1962–63 season. Spartak finished three points above city rivals Botev Plovdiv, in a closely fought battle for the title. Spartak's Todor Diev finished as the top goalscorer that season, with 26 goals coming second the previous year.

As league champions the previous season, the club participated in the European Cup competition for the first time in 1963–64 against Partizani (0–1, 3–1) and PSV Eindhoven (0–1, 0–0). The second continental participation was in Inter-Cities Fairs Cup 1966–67 against S.L. Benfica (1–1, 0–3). In 1964, Spartak reached the Balkans Cup final, losing to FC Rapid București after two legs: 1–1 at home and 0–2 away.

In 1967, Spartak was merged with SSK Akademik and Botev Plovdiv into a new club – AFD Trakia. An independent Spartak did not re-emerge until 1982. The club spent the period from 1982 to 1994 in the second and third divisions. In the 1993–94 season, Spartak finished 2nd in B PFG, and qualified again for the A PFG, after 27 years of absence from top football. But two seasons later, the team was relegated again to the B PFG. The club merged in 1998 with Komatevo Sokol`94 and were renamed Spartak-S`94. This remained the club's official name until the 2001–02 season.

Spartak dissolved its senior squad in 2016, due to financial problems. In 2017, the club was restored, starting from the fourth tier of football, Regional A OFG Plovdiv. In the same year, the club introduced an updated crest, displaying the helmet of Spartacus, after whom the club is named. In 2020, the club promoted to the Third League, but was relegated the next season. After one year, Spartak again reached the Third League.

Spartak began the 2023–24 season in the Third League in a very strong form, winning all 10 of their first games. Spartak was in contention for promotion to the Second League up until the last round along with Nesebar and Sayana Haskovo. Spartak eventually finished third, missing out on promotion, which was achieved by Nesebar instead.

== Honours ==
=== Domestic ===
- First League:
  - Winners (1): 1962–63
- Bulgarian Cup:
  - Winners (1): 1958

== Logo, shirt and sponsor ==
Previous crest used until 2016.

Period	Kit Manufacturer	Shirt partner
2018–2022	(Italy) Erreà	Gaming Club Imperia
2022–2025	(Italy) Macron	Gaming Club Imperia
2025–2026	(Italy) Givova	Gaming Club Imperia
2026–	(Germany) Jako	Gaming Club Imperia

== Players ==
As of 1 January 1995

Note: Flags indicate national team as defined under FIFA eligibility rules; some limited exceptions apply. Players may hold more than one non-FIFA nationality.

No.	Pos.	Nation	Player
1	GK	BUL	Vladimir Chernev
2	DF	BUL	Petar Penchev
3	DF	BUL	Kiril Andonov
5	DF	BUL	Zapryan Rakov
6	MF	BUL	Marin Bakalov
7	MF	BUL	Kostadin Gerganchev
8	MF	SRB	Sasha Vukojevic
9	FW	BUL	Anatoli Tonov
10	MF	ARM	Artashes Adamyan
11	FW	BUL	Geno Dobrevski

No.	Pos.	Nation	Player
12	GK	BUL	Borislav Dragomirov
13	DF	BUL	Neno Nenov
14	FW	BUL	Dragomir Delev
15	DF	BUL	Yonko Nedelchev
16	MF	BUL	Ivan Dobrevski
18	FW	BUL	Nikolay Pramatarov
19	DF	BUL	Ivan Kochev
20	DF	BUL	Tanyo Ganev
21	DF	BUL	Plamen Lukov
22	DF	BUL	Georgi Chakarov

== Notable players ==
Had international caps for their respective countries, held any club record, or had more than 100 league appearances. Players whose name is listed in bold represented their countries.

Bulgaria

- (Bulgaria) Kiril Andonov
- (Bulgaria) Emil Argirov
- (Bulgaria) **Danail Bachkov**
- (Bulgaria) Marin Bakalov
- (Bulgaria) Svetoslav Chitakov
- (Bulgaria) **Krasimir Chomakov**
- (Bulgaria) **Todor Diev**
- (Bulgaria) **Dimitar Dimov**
- (Bulgaria) **Yordan Filipov**
- (Bulgaria) **Georgi Hristakiev**
- (Bulgaria) **Yordan Hristov**
- (Bulgaria) **Murad Ibrahim**
- (Bulgaria) **Biser Ivanov**
- (Bulgaria) Georgi Lazarov
- (Bulgaria) **Dimitar Marashliev**
- (Bulgaria) Petar Penchev
- (Bulgaria) **Apostol Popov**
- (Bulgaria) **Dimitar Popov**
- (Bulgaria) Todor Simeonov
- (Bulgaria) **Georgi Sokolov**
- (Bulgaria) Hristo Staev
- (Bulgaria) **Vladimir Stoyanov**
- (Bulgaria) **Kostadin Vidolov**
- (Bulgaria) Aleksandar Vitanov
- (Bulgaria) **Krum Yanev**

Europe

- (Armenia) **Artashes Adamyan**

== European record ==
Season	Competition	Round	Club	Home	Away	Aggregate
1963–64	European Cup	Preliminary round	(Albania) FK Partizani Tirana	3–1	0–1	3–2
1963–64	European Cup	First round	(Netherlands) PSV Eindhoven	0–1	0–0	0–1
1966–67	Inter-Cities Fairs Cup	Second round	(Portugal) S.L. Benfica	1–1	0–3	1–4
1995	Intertoto Cup	Group 12	(Germany) Eintracht Frankfurt	0–4	–	**3rd**
1995	Intertoto Cup	Group 12	(Greece) Iraklis	–	0–0	**3rd**
1995	Intertoto Cup	Group 12	(Lithuania) Panerys Vilnius	3–0	–	**3rd**
1995	Intertoto Cup	Group 12	(Austria) Vorwärts Steyr	–	0–2	**3rd**
