= Said Ibraimov =

Bulgarian footballer (born 1970)

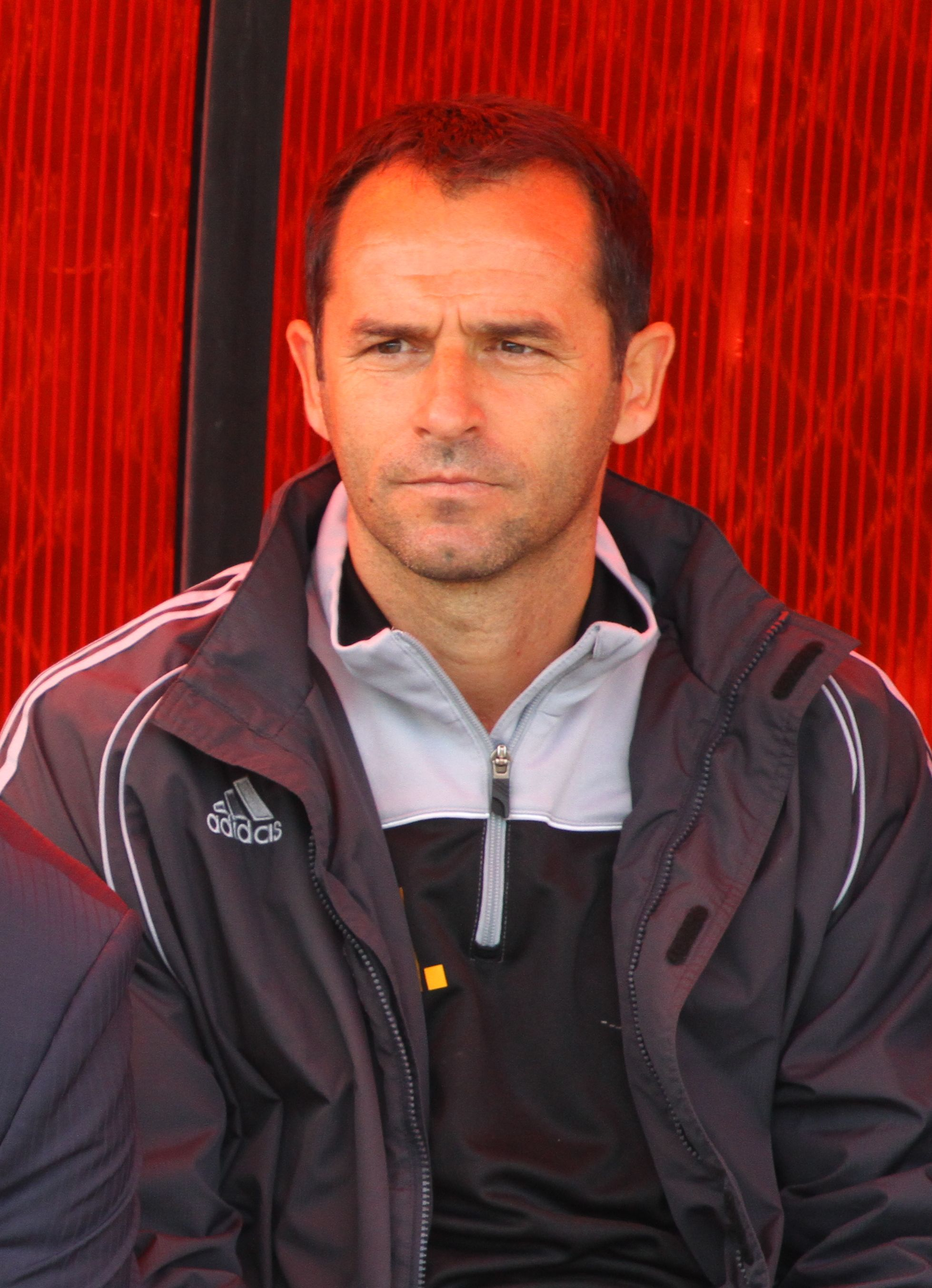

Personal information
- Full name: Said Ibraimov Ibraimov
- Date of birth: 14 October 1970 (age 56)
- Place of birth: Hadzhidimovo, Bulgaria
- Position: Defender

Team information
- Current team: Astana (assistant coach)

Youth career
- Pirin Blagoevgrad

Senior career*
| Years | Team | Apps | (Gls) |
| 1990–1995 | Montana | 67 | (?) |
| 1995–1998 | Volov Shumen | | |
| 1998–2002 | Naftex Burgas | 103 | (6) |
| 1999–2000 | → Litex Lovech (loan) | 0 | (0) |
| 2002–2004 | Levski Sofia | 15 | (0) |

Managerial career
- 2005–2013: Litex Lovech (coach)
- 2013–2014: Botev Plovdiv (assistant)
- 2014–2018: Astana (coach)
- 2022–: Astana (assistant)
- * Club domestic league appearances and goals

Said Ibraimov (Bulgarian: Саид Ибраимов) (born 14 October 1970) is a Bulgarian former footballer who is currently an assistant coach at Astana.

== Career ==
Coming through the youth ranks of Pirin Blagoevgrad, Ibraimov played for Montana, Naftex Burgas, Litex Lovech and Levski Sofia, winning a Bulgarian Cup with the "bluemen" during the 2002/2003 season. After retiring from the game, he became manager and was part of the coaching team at Litex Lovech during the 2008/2009 season. He was announced as the head coach of Etar 1924 in late December 2011, though a few days later it turned out that no agreement had been reached.

== Honours ==
=== Assistant Manager ===
- (Bulgaria) Litex Lovech
  - Bulgarian Cup (1): 2009
- Astana
  - Kazakhstan Premier League (4): 2014, 2015, 2016, 2017
  - Kazakhstan Super Cup (1): 2015
  - Kazakhstan Cup (1): 2016
