= Kiril Nikolov (footballer) =

Bulgarian footballer

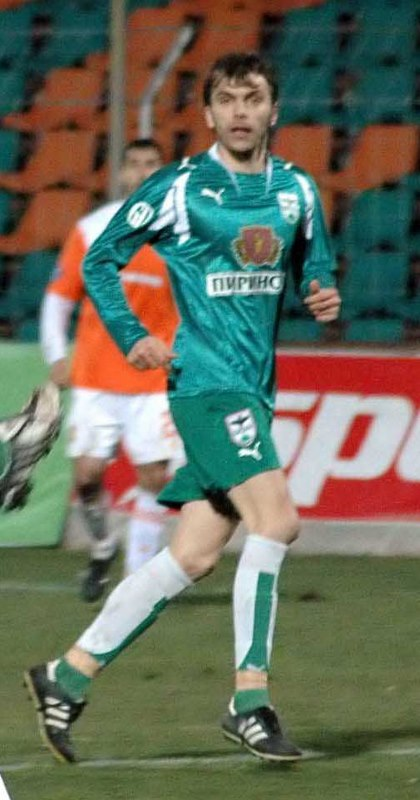

Personal information
- Date of birth: 18 June 1976 (age 50)
- Place of birth: Dupnitsa, Bulgaria
- Height: 1.84 m (6 ft 0 in)
- Position: Midfielder

Senior career*
Years	Team	Apps	(Gls)
1994–1996	Marek Dupnitsa	32	(7)
1996–1999	Metalurg Pernik	50	(4)
1999	Minyor Pernik	14	(1)
2000–2004	Litex Lovech	119	(15)
2004	→ S.C. Braga (loan)	5	(0)
2005	Marek Dupnitsa	14	(1)
2005	Turan Tovuz	12	(3)
2006	Marek Dupnitsa	7	(1)
2007	Slavia Sofia	18	(0)
2008–2009	Pirin Blagoevgrad	32	(3)
2009–2010	Vihren Sandanski	6	(0)
2010–2011	Septemvri Simitli	11	(1)
- * Club domestic league appearances and goals

Kiril Nikolov (Bulgarian: Кирил Николов; born 18 June 1976 in Dupnitsa) is a former Bulgarian footballer who played as a midfielder.

== Career ==
Nikolov start to play football in Marek Dupnitsa. After that played for F.C. Metalurg Pernik, Minyor Pernik, Litex Lovech, Portuguese S.C. Braga, Marek, Azerbaijani Turan Tovuz, Greek Aiolikos F.C., Slavia Sofia and Pirin Blagoevgrad. With Litex he won the 2001 Bulgarian Cup.

== Honours ==
=== Club ===
Litex Lovech

- Bulgarian Cup: 2000–01
