= 2007–08 PFC Levski Sofia season =

Levski Sofia
2007–08 season
- Chairman: Todor Batkov
- Manager: Stanimir Stoilov (until 6 May 2008); Velislav Vutsov
- A Group: Second place
- Bulgarian Cup: Quarter-finals
- UEFA Champions League: 2nd round
- Bulgarian Supercup: Winner
- Top goalscorer: League: Nikolay Dimitrov (8 goals); All: Nikolay Dimitrov (8 goals)
- Highest home attendance: 15 000 vs CSKA Sofia (1 December 2007)
- Lowest home attendance: 0 vs Beroe (18 August 2007)
Home colours	Away colours

The 2007–08 season is Levski Sofia's 86th season in the First League. This article shows player statistics and all matches (official and friendly) that the club has played during the 2007–08 season.

== Transfers ==
=== Summer transfers ===
In:

No.	Pos.	Nation	Player
—	MF	MKD	Darko Tasevski (free transfer from (Ukraine) Metalurh Zaporizhya)
—	DF	MAR	Youssef Rabeh (from (Morocco) FAR Rabat)
—	DF	MAR	Chakib Benzoukane (from (Morocco) Kawkab Marrakech)

Out:

No.	Pos.	Nation	Player
88	GK	BUL	Nikolay Mihaylov (to (England) Liverpool F.C.)
4	DF	BUL	Stanislav Angelov (to (Germany) Energie Cottbus)

=== Winter transfers ===
In:

No.	Pos.	Nation	Player
—	FW	BUL	Enyo Krastovchev (from Marek Dupnitsa)
—	FW	BRA	Ze Soares (from (Brazil) Clube do Remo)
—	FW	BRA	Joaozinho (from (Brazil) Portuguesa)
—	FW	BRA	Jean Carlos (from (Brazil) Figueirense)

Out:

No.	Pos.	Nation	Player
6	FW	NGR	Richard Eromoigbe (to (Russia) FC Khimki)
10	FW	BUL	Hristo Yovov (to (Cyprus) Aris Limassol)
11	DF	BUL	Elin Topuzakov (to (Israel) Hapoel Ramat Gan)
17	FW	BUL	Valeri Domovchiyski (on loan to (Germany) Hertha Berlin)
21	MF	BUL	Dimitar Telkiyski (to (Israel) Hapoel Ramat Gan)
27	FW	FRA	Cedric Bardon (to (Israel) Bnei Yehuda)
28	FW	BUL	Emil Angelov (to Litex Lovech)
29	FW	NGR	Ekundayo Jayeoba (to (Israel) Maccabi Herzliya)
77	FW	BUL	Milan Koprivarov (to Slavia Sofia)

== Squad ==
Note: Flags indicate national team as defined under FIFA eligibility rules; some limited exceptions apply. Players may hold more than one non-FIFA nationality.

No.	Pos.	Nation	Player
1	GK	BUL	Georgi Petkov
2	DF	BUL	Viktor Genev
3	DF	BUL	Zhivko Milanov (captain)
4	DF	CRO	Igor Tomasic
5	DF	MAR	Youssef Rabeh
7	MF	BUL	Daniel Borimirov
8	MF	BUL	Georgi Sarmov
9	FW	BRA	Jean Carlos
10	FW	BRA	Joaozinho
11	FW	BUL	Ze Soares
12	GK	BUL	Bozhidar Mitrev
13	MF	ISR	Eli Zizov
14	DF	BUL	Veselin Minev

No.	Pos.	Nation	Player
15	DF	MAR	Chakib Benzoukane
16	FW	BUL	Mariyan Ognyanov
18	MF	BUL	Miroslav Ivanov
19	FW	BUL	Boyan Tabakov
20	FW	BUL	Aleksandar Kirov
22	MF	MKD	Darko Tasevski
24	FW	BUL	Nikolay Dimitrov
25	DF	BRA	Lucio Wagner
27	FW	BUL	Enyo Krastovchev
29	FW	BUL	Ismail Isa
30	MF	BUL	Lachezar Baltanov
31	GK	BUL	Tsvetan Dimitrov

== Competitions ==
=== Bulgarian Supercup ===
26 July 2007	Levski Sofia	2–1 (a.e.t.)	Litex Lovech	Sofia
18:00	Bardon 11'; Jayeoba 109'	Report	Beto 90'	Stadium: Vasil Levski National Stadium; Attendance: 14,000; Referee: Hristo Ristoskov

=== A Group ===
==== Table ====
Pos	Team	Pld	W	D	L	GF	GA	GD	Pts	Qualification or relegation
1	CSKA Sofia (C)	30	24	6	0	53	11	+42	78	Did not obtain a license for European competitions (Note: CSKA failed to get a license for the competition due to unpaid debts)
2	Levski Sofia	30	19	5	6	56	19	+37	62	Qualification for Champions League third qualifying round
3	Lokomotiv Sofia	30	16	9	5	47	28	+19	57	Qualification for UEFA Cup second qualifying round (Note: Litex qualify via 2007–08 Bulgarian Cup)
4	Litex Lovech	30	16	8	6	51	26	+25	56	Qualification for UEFA Cup second qualifying round
5	Cherno More	30	13	9	8	39	28	+11	48	Qualification for UEFA Cup first qualifying round

Source: A PFG (in Bulgarian)
Rules for classification: 1st points; 2nd head-to-head points; 3rd head-to-head goal difference; 4th head-to-head goals scored; 5th head-to-head away goals scored; 6th goal difference; 7th goals scored
(C) Champions

==== Results summary ====
Overall								Home						Away					
Pld	W	D	L	GF	GA	GD	Pts	W	D	L	GF	GA	GD	W	D	L	GF	GA	GD
30	19	5	6	56	19	+37	62	12	0	3	37	10	+27	7	5	3	19	9	+10

Last updated: 17 May 2008.
Source: Soccerway

==== Results by round ====
Round	1	2	3	4	5	6	7	8	9	10	11	12	13	14	15	16	17	18	19	20	21	22	23	24	25	26	27	28	29	30
Ground	A	H	A	H	A	H	A	H	A	H	A	H	A	H	A	H	A	H	A	H	A	H	A	H	A	H	A	H	A	H
Result	W	W	L	W	D	W	W	W	W	W	D	W	D	L	D	W	W	L	L	W	W	W	W	W	W	W	L	L	D	W
Position	4	3	6	3	5	2	2	2	2	2	2	2	2	2	2	2	2	3	3	3	2	2	2	2	2	2	2	2	2	2

A = Away; H = Home; W = Win; D = Draw; L = Loss

==== Fixtures and results ====
11 August 2007 1	Vihren Sandanski	0–1	Levski Sofia	Sandanski
(EET)		Report	Milanov 58'	Stadium: Sandanski Stadium; Attendance: 6,000; Referee: Stanislav Todorov

18 August 2007 2	Levski Sofia	1–0	Beroe	Sofia
(EET)	Eromoigbe 45'	Report		Stadium: Georgi Asparuhov Stadium; Attendance: 0 Referee: Stanislav Stavrov

25 August 2007 3	Litex Lovech	2–1	Levski Sofia	Lovech
(EET)	Popov 1'; Boudarene 90+2'	Report	Tasevski 72'	Stadium: Lovech Stadium; Attendance: 6,000; Referee: Sasha Kever

1 September 2007 4	Levski Sofia	3–1	Lokomotiv Plovdiv	Sofia
(EET)	Domovchiyski 45' (pen.); N. Dimitrov 46'; Tasevski 59'	Report	Goranov 44'	Stadium: Georgi Asparuhov Stadium; Attendance: 0 Referee: Stanislav Stavrov

16 September 2007 5	Belasitsa Petrich	0–0	Levski Sofia	Petrich
(EET)		Report		Stadium: Tsar Samuil Stadium; Attendance: 3,000; Referee: Anton Genov

22 September 2007 6	Levski Sofia	4–0	Cherno More	Sofia
(EET)	N. Dimitrov 11'; Telkiyski 13'; Domovchiyski 28', 87' (pen.)	Report		Stadium: Georgi Asparuhov Stadium; Attendance: 7,000; Referee: Ahmed Ahmed

29 September 2007 7	Spartak Varna	1–2	Levski Sofia	Varna
(EET)	Stoev 67'	Report	N. Dimitrov 9'; Telkiyski 88'	Stadium: Spartak Stadium; Attendance: 4,000; Referee: Hristo Ristoskov

6 October 2007 8	Levski Sofia	4–2	Marek Dupnitsa	Sofia
(EET)	Domovchiyski 4' 14' 31' 60'; Telkiyski 14'	Report	Yordanov 10'; Pavlović 17'	Stadium: Vasil Levski National Stadium; Attendance: 7,000; Referee: Kolyo Danev

20 October 2007 9	Vidima-Rakovski	1–3	Levski Sofia	Sevlievo
(EET)	D. Ivanov 72'	Report	Bardon 35', 60'; Tasevski 58'	Stadium: Rakovski Stadium; Attendance: 3,000; Referee: Martin Bogdev

26 October 2007 10	Levski Sofia	6–2	Botev Plovdiv	Sofia
(EET)	Telkiyski 28'; Yovov 39'; Borimirov 41'; N. Dimitrov 42'; Bardon 45'; Milanov 57'	Report	Hristov 13'; Minev 90'	Stadium: Vasil Levski National Stadium; Attendance: 6,000; Referee: Angel Angelov

3 November 2007 11	Pirin Blagoevgrad	1–1	Levski Sofia	Blagoevgrad
(EET)	Metushev 89'	Report	Domovchiyski 70' (pen.)	Stadium: Hristo Botev; Attendance: 6,000; Referee: Stoyan Aleksiev

24 February 2008 12	Levski Sofia	2–1	Chernomorets Burgas	Sofia
(EET)	Jean Carlos 58'; Borimirov 71'	Report	Marcio Abreu 22'	Stadium: Georgi Asparuhov Stadium; Attendance: 10,000; Referee: Tsvetan Georgiev

24 November 2007 13	Lokomotiv Sofia	0–0	Levski Sofia	Sofia
(EET)		Report		Stadium: Lokomotiv Stadium; Attendance: 5,000; Referee: Kolyo Danev

1 December 2007 14	Levski Sofia	0–1	CSKA Sofia	Sofia
(EET)		Report	Machado 13'	Stadium: Vasil Levski National Stadium; Attendance: 15,000; Referee: Anton Genov

8 December 2007 15	Slavia Sofia	0–0	Levski Sofia	Sofia
(EET)		Report		Stadium: Lokomotiv Stadium; Attendance: 4,000; Referee: Nikolay Yordanov

2 March 2008 16	Levski Sofia	1–0	Vihren Sandanski	Sofia
(EET)	Krastovchev 64'	Report		Stadium: Georgi Asparuhov Stadium; Attendance: 8,000; Referee: Aleksandar Kostadinov

8 March 2008 17	Beroe	0–1	Levski Sofia	Stara Zagora
(EET)		Report	Sarmov 90'	Stadium: Beroe Stadium; Attendance: 15,000; Referee: Angel Bekyarov

15 March 2008 18	Levski Sofia	0–1	Litex Lovech	Sofia
(EET)		Report	Du Bala 25'	Stadium: Georgi Asparuhov Stadium; Attendance: 10,000; Referee: Gerald Lechner

19 March 2008 19	Lokomotiv Plovdiv	1–0	Levski Sofia	Plovdiv
(EET)	Miliev 78'	Report		Stadium: Lokomotiv Stadium; Attendance: 0 Referee: Nikolay Yordanov

22 March 2008 20	Levski Sofia	4–0	Belasitsa Petrich	Sofia
(EET)	N. Dimitrov 7'; Jean Carlos 25'; Ze Soares 40'; Joaozinho 86'	Report		Stadium: Georgi Asparuhov Stadium; Attendance: 6,000; Referee: Kolyo Danev

30 March 2008 21	Cherno More	0–1	Levski Sofia	Varna
(EET)		Report	M. Ivanov 71'	Stadium: Ticha Stadium; Attendance: 11,000; Referee: Anton Genov

5 April 2008 22	Levski Sofia	3–0	Spartak Varna	Sofia
(EET)	M. Ivanov 18'; Jean Carlos 29', 48'	Report		Stadium: Georgi Asparuhov Stadium; Attendance: 2,000; Referee: Ahmed Ahmed

9 April 2008 23	Marek Dupnitsa	0–4	Levski Sofia	Dupnitsa
(EET)		Report	Krastovchev 21', 30', 37', 52'	Stadium: Bonchuk Stadium; Attendance: 2,000; Referee: Stanislav Todorov

12 April 2008 24	Levski Sofia	3–0	Vidima-Rakovski	Sofia
(EET)	N. Dimitrov 31' (pen.); Jean Carlos 37'; Ognyanov 88'	Report		Stadium: Georgi Asparuhov Stadium; Attendance: 3,000; Referee: Georgi Yordanov

20 April 2008 25	Botev Plovdiv	0–3	Levski Sofia	Plovdiv
(EET)		Report	M. Ivanov 2'; Milanov 50'; Joaozinho 72'	Stadium: Hristo Botev Stadium; Attendance: 0 Referee: Hristo Ristoskov

25 April 2008 26	Levski Sofia	4–0	Pirin Blagoevgrad	Sofia
(EET)	Jean Carlos 12'; N. Dimitrov 34' (pen.); Ze Soares 45'; Borimirov 65'	Report	(red card) Mario Metushev	Stadium: Georgi Asparuhov Stadium; Attendance: 2,000; Referee: Stanislav Stavrov

30 April 2008 27	Chernomorets Burgas	2–1	Levski Sofia	Burgas
(EET)	Bozhilov 32'; Krastev 49'	Report	N. Dimitrov 78'	Stadium: Lazur Stadium; Attendance: 3,500; Referee: Stanislav Todorov

4 May 2008 28	Levski Sofia	0–1	Lokomotiv Sofia	Sofia
(EET)		Report	Zlatinski 90'	Stadium: Georgi Asparuhov Stadium; Attendance: 5,000; Referee: Nikolay Yordanov

10 May 2008 29	CSKA Sofia	1–1	Levski Sofia	Sofia
(EET)	V. Dimitrov 55' (pen.)	Report	Krastovchev 43'	Stadium: Bulgarska Armia; Attendance: 18,000; Referee: Anton Genov

17 May 2008 30	Levski Sofia	2–1	Slavia Sofia	Sofia
(EET)	Tasevski 5'; Krastovchev 33'	Report	Tomašić 32' (o.g.)	Stadium: Georgi Asparuhov Stadium; Attendance: 5,000; Referee: Nikolay Yordanov

=== Bulgarian Cup ===
31 October 2007 Second round	Lokomotiv Mezdra	1–2 (a.e.t.)	Levski Sofia	Mezdra
EEST	Nikolov 55'	Report	Milanov 33'; Sarmov 103'	Stadium: Lokomotiv Stadium; Attendance: 6,500; Referee: Anton Genov

12 December 2007 Third round	Chernomorets Burgas	0–2	Levski Sofia	Burgas
EEST		Report	Tomašić 18'; Tsankov 59' (o.g.)	Stadium: Lazur Stadium; Attendance: 6,500; Referee: Tsvetan Georgiev

12 March 2008 Quarterfinal	Litex Lovech	0–0 (a.e.t.) (4–3 p)	Levski Sofia	Lovech
EEST		Report		Stadium: Lovech; Attendance: 7,000; Referee: (Italy) Paolo Dondarini
	Penalties
	Niflore (penalty scored); Genchev (penalty scored); Cambon (penalty missed); Angelov (penalty missed); Janković (penalty scored); Venkov (penalty scored)		(penalty missed) Petkov; (penalty scored) Tomašić; (penalty scored) Krastovchev; (penalty scored) M. Ivanov; (penalty missed) Jean Carlos; (penalty missed) Sarmov

=== UEFA Champions League ===
==== Second qualifying round ====
31 July 2007 1st leg	Tampere United (Finland)	1–0	(Bulgaria) Levski Sofia	Tampere, Finland
EEST	Petrescu 15'	Report		Stadium: Ratina Stadion; Attendance: 8,200; Referee: (Scotland) Douglas McDonald

7 August 2007 2nd leg	Levski Sofia (Bulgaria)	0–1 (0–2 agg.)	(Finland) Tampere United	Sofia, Bulgaria
EEST		Report	Niemi 40'	Stadium: Vasil Levski National Stadium; Attendance: 15,000; Referee: (Germany) Thorsten Kinhofer
