= 2004–05 PFC Levski Sofia season =

Levski Sofia
2004–05 season
- Chairman: (Bulgaria) Todor Batkov
- Manager: (Bulgaria) Stanimir Stoilov
- Stadium: Georgi Asparuhov Stadium
- A Group: Second place
- Bulgarian Cup: Winner
- UEFA Cup: 1st Round
- Top goalscorer: League: Emil Angelov; Dimitar Telkiyski (11 goals); All: Georgi Chilikov (14 goals)

The 2004–05 season was Levski Sofia's 83rd season in the First League. This article shows player statistics and all matches (official and friendly) that the club has played during the 2004–05 season.

== First-team squad ==
Squad at end of season

Note: Flags indicate national team as defined under FIFA eligibility rules; some limited exceptions apply. Players may hold more than one non-FIFA nationality.

No.	Pos.	Nation	Player
1	GK	BUL	Georgi Petkov
2	DF	BUL	Martin Dimov
3	DF	BUL	Zhivko Milanov
4	DF	BUL	Igor Tomasic
5	DF	BUL	Georgi Markov
6	MF	NGR	Richard Eromoigbe
7	MF	BUL	Daniel Borimirov
8	MF	BUL	Stanislav Genchev
9	FW	BUL	Todor Kolev
10	MF	BUL	Hristo Yovov
11	DF	BUL	Elin Topuzakov
13	MF	BUL	Asen Bukarev
14	MF	BUL	Nikolay Petrov
15	MF	SCG	Saša Simonović
16	MF	BUL	Marian Ognyanov

No.	Pos.	Nation	Player
17	FW	BUL	Valeri Domovchiyski
18	MF	BUL	Miroslav Ivanov
19	FW	BUL	Georgi Chilikov
20	MF	BUL	Stanislav Angelov
21	MF	BUL	Dimitar Telkiyski
22	DF	BUL	Ilian Stoyanov
23	FW	NGR	Ekundayo Jayeoba
24	MF	BUL	Nikolay Dimitrov
25	DF	BRA	Lucio Wagner
27	GK	BUL	Dimitar Ivankov
28	FW	BUL	Emil Angelov
77	MF	BUL	Milan Koprivarov
88	GK	BUL	Nikolay Mihaylov
—	DF	BUL	Stefan Donchev
—	MF	BUL	Lyubomir Lyubenov

== Competitions ==
=== A Group ===
==== Table ====
Pos	Team	Pld	W	D	L	GF	GA	GD	Pts	Qualification or relegation
1	CSKA Sofia (C)	30	25	4	1	81	16	+65	79	Qualification for Champions League second qualifying round
2	Levski Sofia	30	24	4	2	76	19	+57	76	Qualification for UEFA Cup second qualifying round
3	Lokomotiv Plovdiv	30	18	4	8	65	34	+31	58	Qualification for UEFA Cup second qualifying round
4	Litex Lovech	30	16	4	10	45	27	+18	52	Qualification for UEFA Cup second qualifying round
5	Slavia Sofia	30	13	9	8	43	33	+10	48	

Source: A PFG (in Bulgarian)
Rules for classification: 1st points; 2nd head-to-head points; 3rd head-to-head goal difference; 4th head-to-head goals scored; 5th head-to-head away goals scored; 6th goal difference; 7th goals scored; 8th "sportsmanship" (R & Y cards); 9th draw
(C) Champions

==== Results summary ====
Overall								Home						Away					
Pld	W	D	L	GF	GA	GD	Pts	W	D	L	GF	GA	GD	W	D	L	GF	GA	GD
30	24	4	2	76	19	+57	76	13	0	2	47	11	+36	11	4	0	29	8	+21

Last updated: 28 May 2005.
Source: Soccerway

==== Results by round ====
Round	1	2	3	4	5	6	7	8	9	10	11	12	13	14	15	16	17	18	19	20	21	22	23	24	25	26	27	28	29	30
Ground	H	H	A	H	A	H	A	H	A	H	A	H	A	H	A	A	A	H	A	H	A	H	A	H	A	H	A	H	A	H
Result	W	W	W	W	W	W	D	W	D	W	W	W	W	W	D	W	W	L	W	W	W	W	W	L	W	W	W	W	D	W
Position	3	1	2	2	2	2	2	2	2	2	2	2	2	2	2	2	2	2	2	2	2	2	2	2	2	2	2	2	2	2

A = Away; H = Home; W = Win; D = Draw; L = Loss

==== Fixtures and results ====
6 August 2004 1	Levski Sofia	3–0	Slavia Sofia	Sofia
(EET)	Angelov 30'; Telkiyski 52'; Kolev 90'	Report		Stadium: Georgi Asparuhov Stadium; Attendance: 4,000; Referee: Momchil Vraykov

15 August 2004 2	Levski Sofia	2–0	Vidima-Rakovski	Sofia
(EET)	Telkiyski 39', 50'	Report		Stadium: Georgi Asparuhov Stadium; Attendance: 4,000; Referee: Kolyo Danev

22 August 2004 3	Litex Lovech	0–1	Levski Sofia	Lovech
(EET)		Report	Kolev 88'	Stadium: Lovech Stadium; Attendance: 7,000; Referee: Dimitar Kostov

29 August 2004 4	Levski Sofia	3–2	Marek	Sofia
(EET)	Chilikov 10'; Angelov 45'; Kolev 90+3'	Report	Mutafov 37'; Todorov 90'	Stadium: Georgi Asparuhov Stadium; Attendance: 5,000; Referee: Galin Muskalev

11 September 2004 5	Belasitsa Petrich	0–1	Levski Sofia	Petrich
(EET)		Report	Angelov 65'	Stadium: Tsar Samuil Stadium; Attendance: 5,000; Referee: Kostadin Kostadinov

19 September 2004 6	Levski Sofia	4–0	Pirin Blagoevgrad	Sofia
(EET)	Simonović 6'; Chilikov 10'; Angelov 38'; Telkiyski 48'	Report		Stadium: Georgi Asparuhov Stadium; Attendance: 2,800; Referee: Dimitar Dimitrov

25 September 2004 7	Lokomotiv Plovdiv	2–2	Levski Sofia	Plovdiv
(EET)	Mihaylov 21'; Jančevski 90'	Report	Chilikov 1'; Borimirov 71'	Stadium: Lokomotiv Stadium; Attendance: 12,000; Referee: Hristo Ristoskov

3 October 2004 8	Levski Sofia	5–1	Rodopa Smolyan	Sofia
(EET)	Chilikov 7'; Telkiyski 48'; Kolev 51'; Angelov 75'; Genchev 83'	Report	Redovski 14'	Stadium: Georgi Asparuhov Stadium; Attendance: 2,000; Referee: Stanislav Todorov

17 October 2004 9	CSKA Sofia	2–2	Levski Sofia	Sofia
(EET)	Sakaliev 10'; Hristo Yanev 45' (pen.)	Report	Telkiyski 52'; Borimirov 59'	Stadium: Vasil Levski National Stadium; Attendance: 13,500; Referee: Anton Genov

23 October 2004 10	Levski Sofia	2–0	Nesebar	Sofia
(EET)	Angelov 21'; Kolev 90'	Report		Stadium: Georgi Asparuhov Stadium; Attendance: 2,000; Referee: Petar Stoyanov

30 October 2004 11	Neftohimik Burgas	0–2	Levski Sofia	Burgas
(EET)		Report	Borimirov 40'; Bornosuzov 77' (o.g.)	Stadium: Lazur Stadium; Attendance: 4,800; Referee: Hristo Ristokov

6 November 2004 12	Levski Sofia	4–1	Spartak Varna	Sofia
(EET)	Borimirov 25'; Telkiyski 46'; Ognyanov 76', 90'	Report	Stefanov 88'	Stadium: Georgi Asparuhov Stadium; Attendance: 2,000; Referee: Angel Angelov

14 November 2004 13	Beroe	0–1	Levski Sofia	Stara Zagora
(EET)		Report	Angelov 59'	Stadium: Beroe Stadium; Attendance: 10,000; Referee: Anton Genov

21 November 2004 14	Levski Sofia	5–0	Lokomotiv Sofia	Sofia
(EET)	Borimirov 5', 67' (pen.); Domovchiyski 45'; Chilikov 54', 73'	Report		Stadium: Georgi Asparuhov Stadium; Attendance: 2,000; Referee: Hristo Ristoskov

27 November 2004 15	Cherno More	0–0	Levski Sofia	Varna
(EET)		Report		Stadium: Ticha Stadium; Attendance: 6,000; Referee: Momchil Vraykov

26 February 2005 16	Slavia Sofia	0–2	Levski Sofia	Sofia
(EET)		Report	Borimirov 35', 52'	Stadium: Ovcha Kupel Stadium; Attendance: 8,000; Referee: Dimitar Dimitrov

5 March 2005 17	Vidima-Rakovski	1–4	Levski Sofia	Sevlievo
(EET)	Bashov 72'	Report	Telkiyski 8'; Koprivarov 40', 60'; Yovov 86'	Stadium: Rakovski Stadium; Attendance: 8,000; Referee: Anton Genov

12 March 2005 18	Levski Sofia	0–1	Litex Lovech	Sofia
(EET)		Report	Sandrinho 15'	Stadium: Georgi Asparuhov Stadium; Attendance: 8,500; Referee: Hristo Ristoskov

19 March 2005 19	Marek Dupnitsa	0–1	Levski Sofia	Dupnitsa
(EET)		Report	Telkiyski 38' (pen.)	Stadium: Bonchuk; Attendance: 3,500; Referee: Momchil Vraykov

2 April 2005 20	Levski Sofia	8–1	Belasitsa Petrich	Sofia
(EET)	Telkiyski 7'; Jayeoba 18'; Domovchiyski 31', 59', 77'; Simonović 46'; Yovov 53'; Koprivarov 65'	Report	Dimitrov 87'	Stadium: Georgi Asparuhov Stadium; Attendance: 2,000; Referee: Petar Stoyanov

6 April 2005 21	Pirin Blagoevgrad	0–1	Levski Sofia	Blagoevgrad
(EET)		Report	Angelov 51'	Stadium: Hristo Botev Stadium; Attendance: 8,000; Referee: Valeri Petrovski

9 April 2005 22	Levski Sofia	2–1	Lokomotiv Plovdiv	Sofia
(EET)	Domovchiyski 15'; Jayeoba 90'	Report	Iliev 53'	Stadium: Georgi Asparuhov Stadium; Attendance: 8,000; Referee: Dimitar Dimitrov

17 April 2005 23	Rodopa Smolyan	1–2	Levski Sofia	Smolyan
(EET)	Avramov 44'	Report	Tomašić 86'; Angelov 90'	Stadium: Septemvri Stadium; Attendance: 7,000; Referee: Stoyan Aleksiev

23 April 2005 24	Levski Sofia	0–1	CSKA Sofia	Sofia
(EET)		Report	Yanev 75' (pen.)	Stadium: Vasil Levski National Stadium; Attendance: 17,123; Referee: Momchil Vraykov

30 April 2005 25	Nesebar	2–3	Levski Sofia	Nesebar
(EET)	Zhechev 57'; Bosilkov 87'	Report	Yovov 29'; Domovchiyski 43'; Topuzakov 74'	Stadium: Nesebar Stadium; Attendance: 450; Referee: Kostadin Kostadinov

7 May 2005 26	Levski Sofia	4–1	Neftohimik Burgas	Sofia
(EET)	Domovchiyski 45'; Yovov 48'; Milanov 54'; Telkiyski 90' (pen.)	Report	Mica 86'	Stadium: Georgi Asparuhov Stadium; Attendance: 1,000; Referee: Valeri Petrovski

11 May 2005 27	Spartak Varna	0–7	Levski Sofia	Varna
(EET)		Report	Borimirov 8'; Chilikov 19', 31', 76'; Angelov 28', 90'; Domovchiyski 62'	Stadium: Spartak Stadium; Attendance: 3,500; Referee: Kostadin Kostadinov

15 May 2005 28	Levski Sofia	3–1	Beroe Stara Zagora	Sofia
(EET)	Jayeoba 34'; Domovchiyski 48'; Borimirov 64'	Report	Kwakye 56'	Stadium: Georgi Asparuhov Stadium; Attendance: 2,000; Referee: Galin Muskalev

21 May 2005 29	Lokomotiv Sofia	0–0	Levski Sofia	Sofia
(EET)		Report		Stadium: Lokomotiv Stadium; Attendance: 1,500; Referee: Dimitar Dimitrov

28 May 2005 30	Levski Sofia	2–1	Cherno More	Sofia
(EET)	M. Ivanov 9', 22'	Report	Timnev 11'	Stadium: Georgi Asparuhov Stadium; Attendance: 2,000; Referee: Ivan Babanov

=== Bulgarian Cup ===
27 October 2004 Second round	Nesebar	0–5	Levski Sofia	Nesebar
(EET)		Report	Chilikov 19'; Kolev 33', 66'; Simonović 40', 83'	Stadium: Nesebar Stadium; Attendance: 1,000; Referee: Dimitar Dimitrov

10 November 2004 Third round	Etar Veliko Tarnovo	0–3	Levski Sofia	Veliko Tarnovo
(EET)		Report	Lúcio Wagner 12', 50'; Kolev 75'	Stadium: Ivaylo Stadium; Attendance: 10,000; Referee: Stoyan Aleksiev

16 March 2005 Quarterfinal	Levski Sofia	3–0	Neftohimik Burgas	Sofia
(EET)	Koprivarov 7'; Domovchiyski 45', 81'	Report		Stadium: Georgi Asparuhov Stadium; Attendance: 2,000; Referee: Tsvetan Georgiev

13 April 2005 Semifinal 1st leg	Lokomotiv Plovdiv	0–2	Levski Sofia	Plovdiv
(EET)		Report	Chilikov 30'; Koprivarov 43'	Stadium: Lokomotiv Stadium; Attendance: 8,000; Referee: Tsvetan Georgiev

4 May 2005 Semifinal 2nd leg	Levski Sofia	2–1 (4–1 agg.)	Lokomotiv Plovdiv	Sofia
(EET)	Jayeoba 29'; Domovchiyski 89'	Report	Halimi 60'	Stadium: Georgi Asparuhov Stadium; Attendance: 1,000; Referee: Hristo Ristoskov

25 May 2005 Final	Levski Sofia	2–1	CSKA Sofia	Sofia
(EET)	Borimirov 50'; Domovchiyski 75'; Topuzakov (yellow card) 79' (red card)	Report	Yanev 82' (pen.); Yanchev (yellow card) 49' (red card); Todorov (yellow card) 88' (red card)	Stadium: Vasil Levski National Stadium; Attendance: 10,848; Referee: Anton Genov

=== UEFA Cup ===
==== Second qualifying round ====
12 August 2004 1st leg	Levski Sofia (Bulgaria)	5–0	(Bosnia and Herzegovina) Modriča	Sofia, Bulgaria
19:30	Vasić 5' (o.g.); Chilikov 13', 77', 79'; Angelov 89'	Report		Stadium: Georgi Asparuhov Stadium; Attendance: 9,000; Referee: Jacek Granat (Poland)

26 August 2004 2nd leg	Modriča (Bosnia and Herzegovina)	0–3 (0–8 agg.)	(Bulgaria) Levski Sofia	Modriča, Bosnia and Herzegovina
20:30		Report	Telkiyski 49'; Lucio Wagner 83', 90'	Stadium: Stadion Dr. Milan Jelić; Attendance: 300; Referee: Antonio Costa (Portugal)

==== First round ====
16 September 2004 1st leg	Levski Sofia (Bulgaria)	1–1	(Belgium) Beveren	Sofia, Bulgaria
18:30	Telkiyski 62'	Report	Sanogo 64'	Stadium: Georgi Asparuhov Stadium; Attendance: 17,000; Referee: Jouni Hyytia (Finland)

30 September 2004 2nd leg	Beveren (Belgium)	1–0 (2–1 agg.)	(Bulgaria) Levski Sofia	Beveren, Belgium
20:30	Ne 45'	Report		Stadium: Freethiel Stadion; Attendance: 6,000; Referee: Serhiy Shebek (Ukraine)
