= 2005 Bulgarian Cup final =

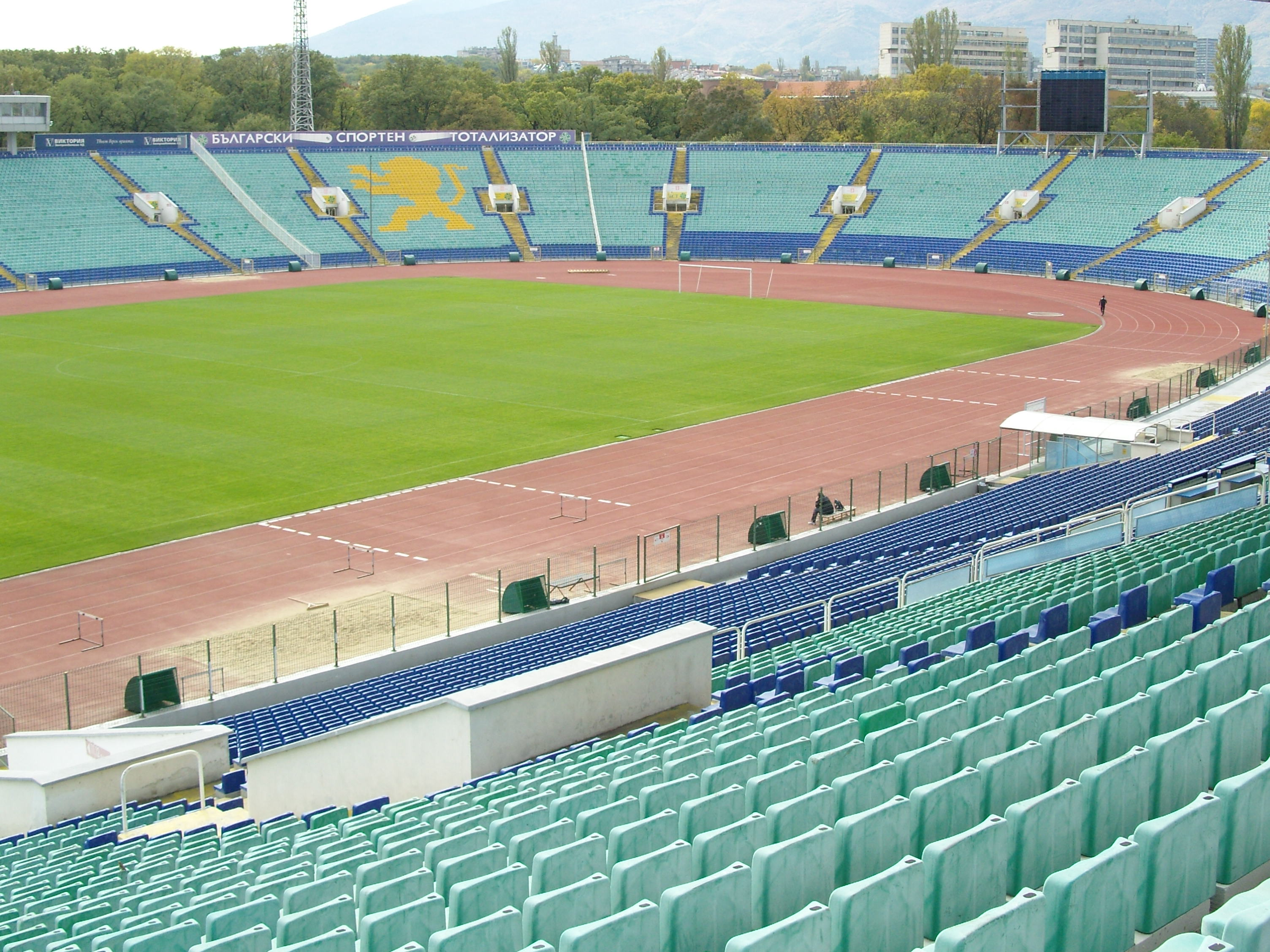
- Event: 2004–05 Bulgarian Cup
Levski Sofia	CSKA Sofia
A Group	A Group
2	1
- Date: 25 May 2005
- Venue: Vasil Levski Stadium, Sofia
- Referee: Anton Genov (Gabrovo)
- Attendance: 10,848

The 2005 Bulgarian Cup final was played at the Vasil Levski National Stadium in Sofia on 25 May 2005 and was contested between the sides of Levski Sofia and CSKA Sofia. The match was refereed by Anton Genov and was won by Levski Sofia. The win gave Levski their 24th Bulgarian Cup success.

== Match ==
=== Details ===
25 May 2005
18:00 EEST

Levski Sofia	2–1	CSKA Sofia
Borimirov 52'; Domovchiyski 76'	Report	Yanev 82' (pen.)

Vasil Levski National Stadium, Sofia
Attendance: 10,848
Referee: Anton Genov (Gabrovo)

Levski	CSKA

Levski:
GK	27	(Bulgaria) Dimitar Ivankov (c) (yellow card) 81'
DF	20	(Bulgaria) Stanislav Angelov (yellow card) 62' (substituted off) 66'
DF	3	(Bulgaria) Zhivko Milanov
DF	25	(Brazil) Lúcio Wagner (yellow card) 67'
DF	11	(Bulgaria) Elin Topuzakov (yellow card) (yellow-red card) 80'
MF	6	(Nigeria) Richard Eromoigbe
MF	7	(Bulgaria) Daniel Borimirov
MF	21	(Bulgaria) Dimitar Telkiyski (yellow card) 72'
MF	77	(Bulgaria) Milan Koprivarov (yellow card) 40' (substituted off) 74'
FW	17	(Bulgaria) Valeri Domovchiyski (yellow card) 36'
FW	23	(Nigeria) Ekundayo Jayeoba (substituted off) 85'
Substitutes:
GK	1	(Bulgaria) Georgi Petkov
DF	4	(Croatia) Igor Tomašić (substituted in) 66' (yellow card) 79'
FW	10	(Bulgaria) Hristo Yovov
MF	18	(Bulgaria) Miroslav Ivanov
FW	19	(Bulgaria) Georgi Chilikov (substituted in) 74'
MF	24	(Bulgaria) Nikolay Dimitrov
FW	28	(Bulgaria) Emil Angelov (substituted in) 85'
Manager:
(Bulgaria) Stanimir Stoilov

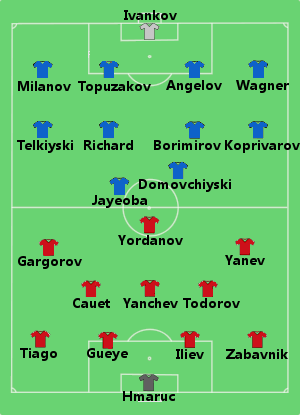

CSKA:
GK	31	(Moldova) Evgheni Hmaruc
DF	2	(Slovakia) Radoslav Zabavnik (yellow card) 50'
DF	14	(Bulgaria) Valentin Iliev (c)
DF	27	(Brazil) Tiago Silva
DF	29	(Senegal) Ibrahima Gueye
MF	5	(Bulgaria) Todor Yanchev (yellow card) 19' (yellow-red card) 51'
MF	15	(France) Benoît Cauet
MF	7	(Bulgaria) Hristo Yanev
MF	23	(Bulgaria) Emil Gargorov
MF	30	(Bulgaria) Yordan Todorov (yellow card) 88' (yellow-red card) 90'
FW	9	(Bulgaria) Evgeni Yordanov (substituted off) 46'
Substitutes:
GK	22	(Serbia and Montenegro) Dejan Maksić
DF	3	(Bulgaria) Yordan Varbanov
FW	8	(Bulgaria) Velizar Dimitrov
MF	10	(Georgia (country)) Amiran Mujiri (substituted in) 46'
DF	16	(Bulgaria) Aleksandar Branekov
MF	20	(Bulgaria) Yordan Yurukov
DF	25	(Bulgaria) Ivan Ivanov
Manager:
(Serbia and Montenegro) Miodrag Ješić
