= 2005–06 A Group =

58th completed season of top-tier football league in Bulgaria

A Group
- Season: 2005–06
- Dates: 6 August 2005 – 31 May 2006
- Champions: Levski Sofia (24th title)
- Relegated: Pirin 1922; Naftex; Pirin
- Champions League: Levski
- UEFA Cup: CSKA; Litex; Lokomotiv Sofia
- Intertoto Cup: Lokomotiv Plovdiv
- Matches: 210
- Goals: 556 (2.65 per match)
- Top goalscorer: (Slovenia) Milivoje Novakovič (Cape Verde) José Furtado (16 goals each)
- Biggest home win: CSKA 7–0 Rodopa
- Biggest away win: Belasitsa 1–5 CSKA; Vihren 1–5 Litex; Beroe 0–4 Cherno More
- Highest scoring: Beroe 4–4 Levski Sofia (8 goals)

The 2005–06 A Group was the 58th season of the top Bulgarian national football league (commonly referred to as A Group) and the 82nd edition of a Bulgarian national championship tournament.

== Overview ==
It was contested by 16 teams, and Levski Sofia won the championship. PFC Vidima-Rakovski Sevlievo, Nesebar, and Spartak Varna were relegated to the B PFG at the end of the last season. The relegated teams were replaced by Vihren Sandanski, Pirin 1922 Blagoevgrad, and Botev Plovdiv. Vihren made their debut in the top tier of Bulgarian football, while both Pirin 1922 and Botev return after a one-year absence.

== Teams ==
=== Stadiums and locations ===
Location of teams in 2005–06 A Group
Sofia 2005–06 A Group football clubs

Team	Location	Stadium	Capacity
Belasitsa	Petrich	Tsar Samuil	12,000
Beroe	Stara Zagora	Beroe	12,500
Botev	Plovdiv	Hristo Botev (Plovdiv)	22,000
Cherno More	Varna	Ticha	8,250
CSKA	Sofia	Balgarska Armia	22,015
Levski	Sofia	Georgi Asparuhov	29,200
Litex	Lovech	Gradski (Lovech)	7,050
Lokomotiv	Plovdiv	Lokomotiv (Plovdiv)	20,000
Lokomotiv	Sofia	Lokomotiv (Sofia)	17,500
Marek	Dupnitsa	Bonchuk	12,500
Naftex	Burgas	Lazur	18,037
Pirin	Blagoevgrad	Hristo Botev (Blagoevgrad)	15,000
Rodopa	Smolyan	Septemvri	6,000
Slavia	Sofia	Slavia	32,000
Vihren	Sandanski	Sandanski	6,000

== League table ==
Pos	Team	Pld	W	D	L	GF	GA	GD	Pts	Qualification or relegation
1	Levski Sofia (C)	28	21	5	2	71	23	+48	68	Qualification for Champions League second qualifying round
2	CSKA Sofia	28	20	5	3	73	22	+51	65	Qualification for UEFA Cup first qualifying round
3	Litex Lovech	28	18	6	4	51	22	+29	60	Qualification for UEFA Cup first qualifying round
4	Lokomotiv Sofia	28	18	0	10	49	29	+20	54	Qualification for UEFA Cup first qualifying round
5	Lokomotiv Plovdiv	28	11	7	10	43	42	+1	40	Qualification for Intertoto Cup second round
6	Belasitsa Petrich	28	11	6	11	33	33	0	39	
7	Slavia Sofia	28	12	3	13	33	34	−1	39	
8	Cherno More	28	10	7	11	29	27	+2	37	
9	Vihren	28	10	2	16	35	55	−20	32	
10	Beroe	28	8	8	12	36	53	−17	32	
11	Marek	28	8	7	13	23	37	−14	31	
12	Rodopa Smolyan	28	7	4	17	23	52	−29	25	
13	Botev Plovdiv	28	4	12	12	20	38	−18	24	
14	Pirin 1922 Blagoevgrad (R)	28	5	8	15	23	46	−23	23	Relegation to 2006–07 B Group
15	Naftex Burgas (R)	28	4	6	18	14	43	−29	18	Relegation to 2006–07 B Group
x	FC Pirin Blagoevgrad (Note: FC Pirin Blagoevgrad were excluded after two matches and demoted to their regional third level league (Southwestern V AFG) for failing to arrange their debts, their results were annulled.) (D)	2	0	0	2	0	3	−3	0	Excluded from the league

Source: A PFG (in Bulgarian)
Rules for classification: 1st points; 2nd head-to-head points; 3rd head-to-head goal difference; 4th head-to-head goals scored; 5th head-to-head away goals scored; 6th goal difference; 7th goals scored; 8th "sportsmanship" (R & Y cards); 9th draw
(C) Champions; (D) Disqualified; (R) Relegated

== Results ==
Home \ Away	BEL	BSZ	BOT	CHM	CSK	LEV	LIT	LPL	LSO	MAR	NAF	PIR	RDP	SLA	VIH
Belasitsa Petrich		4–0	4–1	0–0	1–5	2–1	1–2	1–1	0–1	1–0	2–1	1–0	0–1	2–0	2–0
Beroe	2–1		2–0	0–4	1–4	4–4	3–1	1–1	1–2	0–0	2–1	3–0	3–0	3–2	2–1
Botev Plovdiv	0–0	2–2		0–0	1–4	1–2	0–0	1–1	1–0	1–0	3–3	0–0	1–0	0–0	3–1
Cherno More	4–0	0–0	2–0		0–0	0–1	1–1	0–0	0–2	2–0	1–0	3–1	0–1	1–0	3–1
CSKA Sofia	2–2	7–0	1–0	3–0		0–1	2–1	4–3	3–2	1–1	3–0	2–0	7–0	2–1	6–0
Levski Sofia	2–0	2–0	4–1	3–1	1–1		1–1	4–0	3–1	2–0	6–0	3–0	6–1	5–0	2–0
Litex Lovech	2–1	1–0	2–0	5–2	1–1	1–0		3–1	3–1	4–0	1–0	0–2	3–0	2–1	4–1
Lokomotiv Plovdiv	1–2	2–1	0–0	2–0	1–0	2–4	1–2		1–2	2–0	3–1	3–1	3–1	3–0	2–1
Lokomotiv Sofia	0–1	4–1	1–0	2–1	1–2	0–2	1–0	4–2		4–0	3–0	5–0	3–1	2–1	2–0
Marek	1–3	1–0	3–0	1–1	1–4	2–3	0–0	3–1	0–2		2–0	0–0	1–0	1–0	2–1
Naftex Burgas	0–0	0–0	1–1	1–0	0–1	0–2	0–2	1–1	0–1	0–0		1–2	0–1	1–0	1–0
Pirin 1922 Blagoevgrad	1–1	0–0	0–0	0–1	0–3	1–1	1–3	3–2	0–2	1–2	2–0		2–2	0–1	3–1
Rodopa Smolyan	2–1	2–2	0–0	0–1	1–0	1–2	0–1	1–2	2–1	0–0	1–2	2–1		1–3	1–2
Slavia Sofia	1–0	4–2	2–1	1–0	1–2	2–2	0–0	0–1	2–0	1–0	1–0	3–1	3–0		1–2
Vihren	2–0	3–1	3–2	2–1	1–3	1–2	1–5	1–1	2–0	3–2	2–0	1–1	2–1	0–2	

Source: A PFG (in Bulgarian)
Legend: Blue = home team win; Yellow = draw; Red = away team win.

== Champions ==
Levski Sofia

Goalkeepers
1	(Bulgaria) Georgi Petkov	23	(0)
88	(Bulgaria) Nikolay Mihaylov	6	(0)

Defenders
2	(Bulgaria) Ivan Todorov	1	(0)
3	(Bulgaria) Zhivko Milanov	19	(1)
4	(Bulgaria) Igor Tomašić	23	(1)
5	(Bulgaria) Anton Vergilov*	1	(0)
8	(Bulgaria) Bogomil Dyakov	10	(0)
11	(Bulgaria) Elin Topuzakov	23	(1)
15	(Bulgaria) Borislav Stoychev	1	(0)
20	(Bulgaria) Stanislav Angelov	22	(2)
22	(Bulgaria) Todor Stoev	1	(0)
25	(Bulgaria) Lúcio Wagner	23	(0)

Midfielders
6	(Nigeria) Richard Eromoigbe	26	(0)
7	(Bulgaria) Daniel Borimirov	22	(9)
13	(Bulgaria) Asen Bukarev	13	(0)
14	(Bulgaria) Chetin Sadula	1	(0)
16	(Bulgaria) Mariyan Ognyanov	3	(0)
18	(Bulgaria) Miroslav Ivanov	19	(1)
21	(Bulgaria) Dimitar Telkiyski	26	(11)
24	(Bulgaria) Nikolay Dimitrov	6	(2)
26	(Bulgaria) Galin Ivanov	1	(0)
27	(France) Cédric Bardon	20	(7)
30	(Bulgaria) Lachezar Baltanov	1	(0)
77	(Bulgaria) Milan Koprivarov	21	(4)

Forwards
9	(Bulgaria) Georgi Ivanov	11	(5)
10	(Bulgaria) Hristo Yovov	19	(4)
17	(Bulgaria) Valeri Domovchiyski	24	(11)
19	(Bulgaria) Georgi Chilikov*	1	(0)
23	(Nigeria) Ekundayo Jayeoba	3	(5)
28	(Bulgaria) Emil Angelov	21	(6)
29	(Bulgaria) Antonio Pavlov	1	(1)

Manager
(Bulgaria) Stanimir Stoilov

- Vergilov and Chilikov left the club during a season.

== Top scorers ==
Rank	Scorer	Club	Goals
1	(Slovenia) Milivoje Novaković	Litex Lovech	16
1	(Cape Verde) José Furtado	CSKA (6) / Vihren (10)	16
3	(Bulgaria) Martin Kamburov	Lokomotiv Plovdiv	13
3	(Serbia and Montenegro) Saša Antunović	Lokomotiv Sofia	13
5	(Bulgaria) Valeri Domovchiyski	Levski Sofia	11
5	(Bulgaria) Tsvetan Genkov	Lokomotiv Sofia	11
5	(Bulgaria) Dimitar Telkiyski	Levski Sofia	11
5	(Bulgaria) Emil Gargorov	CSKA Sofia	11
9	(Bulgaria) Stoyko Sakaliev	CSKA Sofia	10
9	(Ivory Coast) Guillaume Dah Zadi	CSKA Sofia	10

== Attendances ==
#	Club	Average
1	Levski	6,228
2	Botev	5,964
3	Cherno More	4,429
4	Lokomotiv Plovdiv	4,250
5	CSKA Sofia	3,725
6	Beroe	3,636
7	Vihren	3,214
8	Rodopa	2,966
9	Belasitsa	2,536
10	Neftochimik	2,464
11	Pirin	2,114
12	Marek	1,907
13	Lovech	1,693
14	Lokomotiv Sofia	1,196
15	Slavia Sofia	1,050
