= 2005 Bulgarian Supercup =

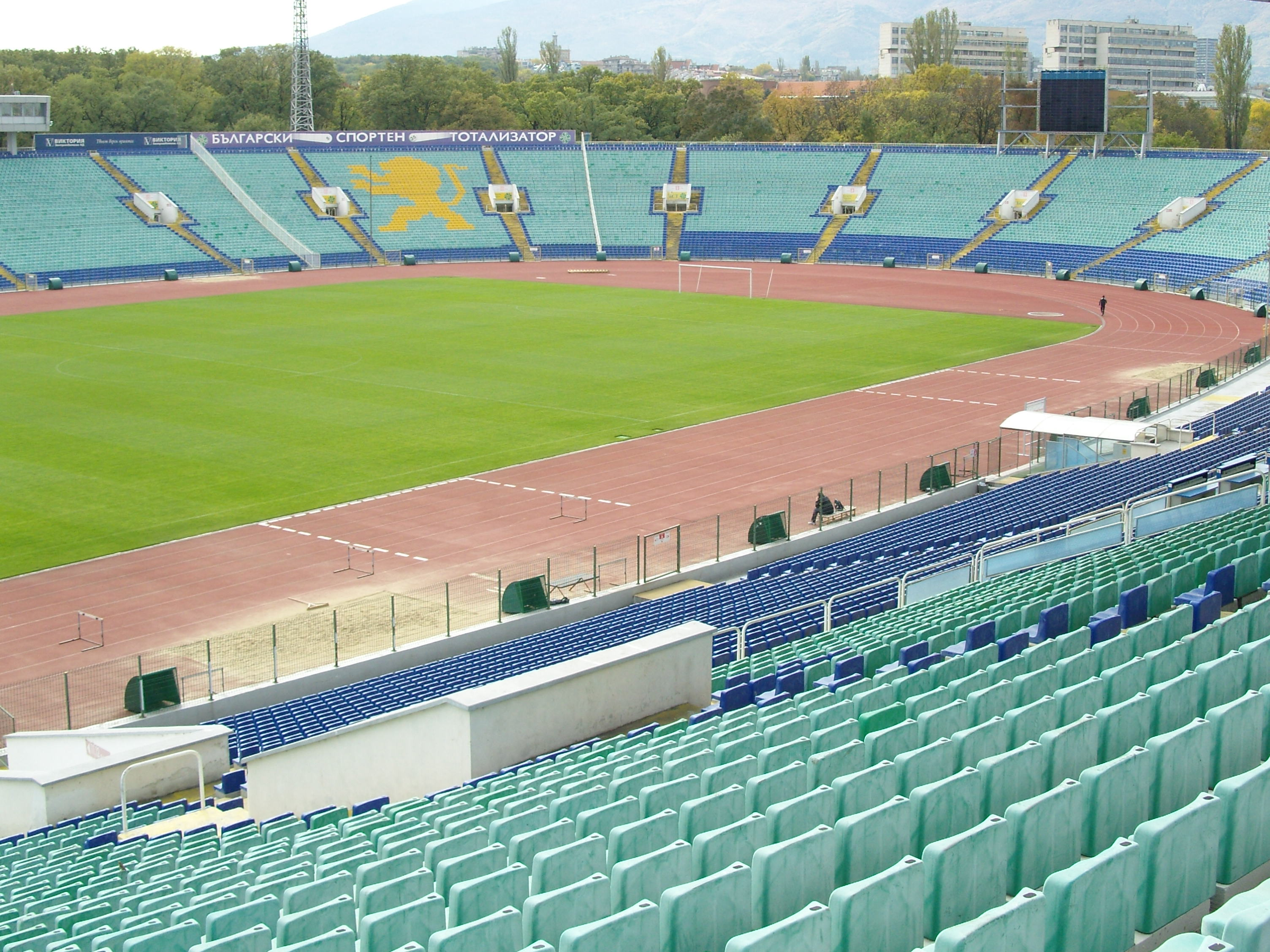
CSKA Sofia	Levski Sofia
A Group	A Group
1	1
- Levski Sofia won 3–1 on penalties
- Date: 31 July 2005
- Venue: Vasil Levski National Stadium, Sofia, Bulgaria
- Referee: Georgios Kaznaferis
- Attendance: 9,894

The 2005 Bulgarian Supercup was the third Bulgarian Supercup match, a football match which was contested between the "A" professional football group champion, CSKA Sofia, and the winner of Bulgarian Cup, Levski Sofia. The match was held on 31 July 2005 at the Vasil Levski National Stadium in Sofia, Bulgaria. Levski beat CSKA 3–1 on penalties after a 1–1 draw at the end of extra time to win their first Bulgarian Supercup.

== Match details ==
31 July 2005
18:30

CSKA Sofia	1–1 (a.e.t.)	Levski Sofia
Yanev 82'	Report	Topuzakov 76'
Penalties
Yanev (penalty missed); Dah Zadi (penalty scored); Gargorov (penalty missed); Iliev (penalty missed)	1–3	(penalty scored) Topuzakov; (penalty missed) Telkiyski; (penalty scored) Borimirov; (penalty scored) Tomašić

Vasil Levski National Stadium, Sofia
Attendance: 9,894
Referee: (Greece) Georgios Kaznaferis

CSKA Sofia	Levski Sofia

CSKA:
GK	31	(Moldova) Evgheni Hmaruc
DF	2	(Slovakia) Radoslav Zabavnik (yellow card) 71'
DF	14	(Bulgaria) Valentin Iliev (c)
DF	27	(Brazil) Tiago Silva (yellow card) 62'
DF	29	(Senegal) Ibrahima Gueye
MF	30	(Bulgaria) Yordan Todorov (yellow card) 67' (substituted off) 118'
MF	7	(Bulgaria) Hristo Yanev
MF	18	(Morocco) Mourad Hdiouad (yellow card) 58'
MF	23	(Bulgaria) Emil Gargorov
FW	17	(Croatia) Matija Matko (substituted off) 46'
FW	21	(Bulgaria) Stoyko Sakaliev (substituted off) 78'
Substitutes:
GK	12	(Bulgaria) Todor Kyuchukov
DF	4	(Bulgaria) Adrian Olegov
DF	16	(Bulgaria) Aleksandar Branekov
DF	33	(Serbia and Montenegro) Slavko Matić (substituted on) 118'
MF	20	(Bulgaria) Yordan Yurukov
FW	11	(Ivory Coast) Guillaume Dah Zadi (substituted on) 78'
FW	15	(Bulgaria) Petar Dimitrov (substituted on) 46' (yellow card) 93'
Manager:
(Serbia and Montenegro) Miodrag Ješić Assistant referees: (Bulgaria) Nikola Djuganski (Bulgaria) Nikolay Angelov; Fourth official: (Bulgaria) Cvetan Georgiev

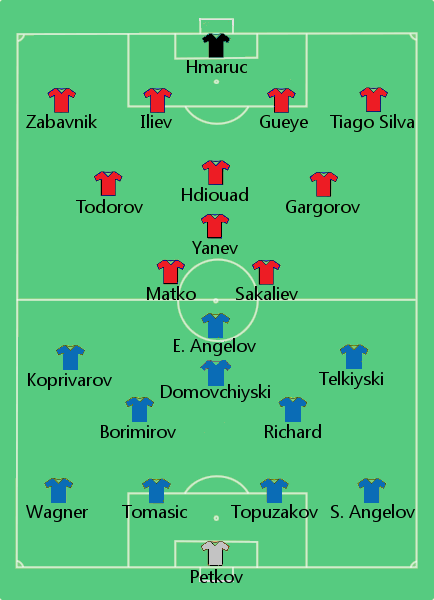

Levski:
GK	1	(Bulgaria) Georgi Petkov
DF	20	(Bulgaria) Stanislav Angelov
DF	11	(Bulgaria) Elin Topuzakov (c)
DF	4	(Croatia) Igor Tomašić
DF	25	(Brazil) Lúcio Wagner
MF	6	(Nigeria) Richard Eromoigbe
MF	7	(Bulgaria) Daniel Borimirov (yellow card) 38'
MF	21	(Bulgaria) Dimitar Telkiyski
FW	17	(Bulgaria) Valeri Domovchiyski (substituted off) 61'
FW	28	(Bulgaria) Emil Angelov (substituted off) 91'
FW	77	(Bulgaria) Milan Koprivarov (yellow card) 77' (substituted off) 82'
Substitutes:
GK	88	(Bulgaria) Nikolay Mihaylov
DF	3	(Bulgaria) Zhivko Milanov
DF	5	(Bulgaria) Anton Vergilov
MF	13	(Bulgaria) Asen Bukarev
MF	18	(Bulgaria) Miroslav Ivanov (substituted on) 82' (yellow card) 99'
FW	19	(Bulgaria) Georgi Chilikov (substituted on) 61'
FW	23	(Nigeria) Ekundayo Jayeoba (substituted on) 91'
Manager:
(Bulgaria) Stanimir Stoilov
