= 2007 Bulgarian Supercup =

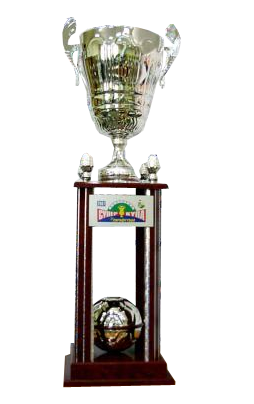
Levski Sofia	Litex Lovech
A Group	A Group
2	1
- Date: 26 July 2007
- Venue: Vasil Levski National Stadium, Sofia, Bulgaria
- Referee: Hristo Ristoskov (Sandanski)
- Attendance: 10,000

The 2007 Bulgarian Supercup was the fifth Bulgarian Supercup match, a football match which was contested between the "A" professional football group champion, Levski Sofia, and the runner-up of Bulgarian Cup, Litex Lovech. The match was held on 26 July 2007 at the Vasil Levski National Stadium in Sofia, Bulgaria. Levski beat Litex 2–1 after extra time to win their second Bulgarian Supercup.

== Match details ==
26 July 2007
20:00

Levski Sofia	2–1 (a.e.t.)	Litex Lovech
Bardon 13'; Jayeoba 109'	Report	Beto 90'

Vasil Levski National Stadium, Sofia
Attendance: 10,000
Referee: Hristo Ristoskov (Sandanski)

Levski Sofia	Litex Lovech

Levski Sofia:
GK	1	(Bulgaria) Georgi Petkov
DF	3	(Bulgaria) Zhivko Milanov
DF	15	(Morocco) Chakib Benzoukane
DF	4	(Croatia) Igor Tomašić
DF	25	(Brazil) Lúcio Wagner
MF	6	(Nigeria) Richard Eromoigbe (yellow card) 104'
MF	22	(North Macedonia) Darko Tasevski (substituted off) 65'
MF	21	(Bulgaria) Dimitar Telkiyski (c) (yellow card) 103'
MF	10	(Bulgaria) Hristo Yovov (substituted off) 78'
FW	27	(France) Cédric Bardon
FW	17	(Bulgaria) Valeri Domovchiyski (substituted off) 60'
Substitutes:
GK	12	(Bulgaria) Bozhidar Mitrev
DF	5	(Bulgaria) Borislav Stoychev
MF	8	(Bulgaria) Georgi Sarmov (substituted in) 78'
MF	18	(Bulgaria) Miroslav Ivanov (substituted in) 65'
FW	77	(Bulgaria) Milan Koprivarov
FW	23	(Nigeria) Ekundayo Jayeoba (substituted in) 60'
FW	24	(Bulgaria) Nikolay Dimitrov
Manager:
(Bulgaria) Stanimir Stoilov

Litex Lovech:
GK	12	(Bulgaria) Todor Todorov
DF	2	(North Macedonia) Robert Popov (c)
DF	22	(Bulgaria) Plamen Nikolov
DF	6	(France) Cédric Uras (yellow card) 48'
DF	5	(Bulgaria) Mihail Venkov
MF	16	(Bulgaria) Stanislav Manolev (substituted off) 103'
MF	10	(Brazil) Sandrinho
MF	17	(France) Fabien Boudarène
MF	24	(Bulgaria) Petar Zlatinov (substituted off) 17'
FW	11	(Brazil) Beto
FW	32	(Bulgaria) Ivelin Popov (substituted off) 71'
Substitutes:
GK	1	(Bulgaria) Ilia Nikolov
DF	20	(Bulgaria) Ivan Bandalovski (substituted in) 103'
DF	13	(Bulgaria) Tihomir Trifonov
DF	15	(Bulgaria) Ivan Skerlev
FW	26	(Brazil) Dudu (substituted in) 17' (yellow card) 103'
FW	23	(Serbia) Nebojša Jelenković
DF	18	(Bulgaria) Krum Bibishkov (substituted in) 71'
Manager:
(Bulgaria) Ferario Spasov
