= 2007–08 Bulgarian Cup =

Tournament details
- Country: Bulgaria

Final positions
- Champions: Litex Lovech (3rd cup)
- Runners-up: Cherno More Varna

The 2007–08 Bulgarian Cup was the 26th official edition of the Bulgarian annual football tournament. The final match between PFC Litex Lovech and PFC Cherno More Varna was held on 14 May 2008 at Vasil Levski National Stadium in Sofia. Litex won their third Bulgarian Cup in their history after winning the match 1-0 thanks to a second-half goal from Stanislav Manolev.

== First round ==
In this round entered winners from the preliminary rounds together with the teams from B Group.

Team 1	Score	Team 2
12 October 2007
Sliven 2000 (II)	2–0	Rodopa Smolyan (II)
Spartak Plovdiv (II)	0–1	Svetkavitsa (II)
13 October 2007
Kaliakra Kavarna (II)	2–0	Volov Shumen (II)
Haskovo (II)	1–2	Chavdar Etropole (II)
Minyor Radnevo (II)	3–1	Chavdar Byala Slatina (II)
Lyubimets (III)	2–1	Svilengrad (II)
Devnya (III)	0–2	Yantra Gabrovo (II)
Rilski Sportist (II)	0–1	Minyor Pernik (II)
Etar 1924 (II)	3–0	Belite orli Pleven (II)
Montana (II)	0–1	Naftex Burgas (II)
Akademik Sofia (II)	2–3	Velbazhd Kyustendil (II)
Kom Minyor Berkovitsa (III)	1–4	Lokomotiv Mezdra (II)
Spartak Pleven (II)	0–2	Dunav Ruse (II)
Bansko (III)	3–1	Pirin Gotse Delchev (II)
Maritsa Plovdiv (II)	0–1	Sportist Svoge (II)
Benkovski Byala (II)	3–0	Nesebar (II)

== Second round ==
This round featured winners from the First Round and all teams from A Group.

Team 1	Score	Team 2
31 October 2007
Lyubimets (III)	0–2	Chernomorets Burgas
Lokomotiv Plovdiv	1–0	CSKA Sofia
Bansko (III)	0–0 (a.e.t.) (5–4 p)	Yantra Gabrovo (II)
Svetkavitsa (II)	0–1 (a.e.t.)	Cherno More Varna
Sliven 2000 (II)	2–2 (a.e.t.) (6–7 p)	Spartak Varna
Naftex Burgas (II)	0–1	Botev Plovdiv
Velbazhd Kyustendil (II)	0–2	Litex Lovech
Kaliakra Kavarna (II)	4–1	Etar 1924 (II)
Minyor Pernik (II)	2–1	Belasitsa Petrich
Chavdar Etropole (II)	0–0 (a.e.t.) (5–3 p)	Marek Dupnitsa
Sportist Svoge (II)	1–0	Dunav Ruse (II)
Lokomotiv Mezdra (II)	1–2 (a.e.t.)	Levski Sofia
Pirin Blagoevgrad	0–0 (a.e.t.) (5–4 p)	Vidima-Rakovski
Benkovski Byala (II)	0–2	Slavia Sofia
Beroe Stara Zagora	0–3	Vihren Sandanski
Minyor Radnevo (II)	0–1	Lokomotiv Sofia

== Third round ==
Team 1	Score	Team 2
5 December 2007
Litex Lovech	3–0	Vihren Sandanski
12 December 2007
Chavdar Etropole (II)	0–2	Kaliakra Kavarna (II)
Sportist Svoge (II)	1–4	Lokomotiv Plovdiv
Lokomotiv Sofia	1–0	Spartak Varna
Bansko (III)	2–6	Cherno More Varna
Minyor Pernik (II)	0–1	Pirin Blagoevgrad
Chernomorets Burgas	0–2	Levski Sofia
Botev Plovdiv	4–2	Slavia Sofia

== Quarter-finals ==
12 March 2008	Kaliakra Kavarna (II)	3–1	Lokomotiv Plovdiv	Kavarna
14:30 EET	Raychev 42'; Karadzhov 63'; Stanchev 85'		Dakson 71'	Stadium: Kavarna; Attendance: 3,000

12 March 2008	Lokomotiv Sofia	0–2	Botev Plovdiv	Sofia
14:30 EET			Garov 33'; Hristov 89' (pen.)	Stadium: Lokomotiv; Attendance: 800

12 March 2008	Cherno More	1–0	Pirin Blagoevgrad	Varna
14:30 EET	Stoyanov 68'			Stadium: Ticha; Attendance: 6,000; Referee: Nikolay Yordanov (Sofia)

12 March 2008	Litex Lovech	0–0 (a.e.t.) (4–3 p)	Levski Sofia	Lovech
17:00 EET		Report		Stadium: Gradski; Attendance: 7,000; Referee: Paolo Dondarini (Italy)
	Penalties
	Niflore (penalty scored); Genchev (penalty scored); Cambon (penalty missed); Angelov (penalty missed); Janković (penalty scored); Venkov (penalty scored)		(penalty missed) Petkov; (penalty scored) Tomašić; (penalty scored) Krastovchev; (penalty scored) M. Ivanov; (penalty missed) Jean Carlos; (penalty missed) Sarmov

== Semi-finals ==
16 April 2008	Kaliakra Kavarna (II)	1–3	Cherno More	Kavarna
17:30 EEST	Kiskinov 49'		Dimitrov 6' (o.g.); Marcos 66'; Georgiev 69'	Stadium: Kavarna; Attendance: 4,500; Referee: Angel Bekyarov (Plovdiv)

16 April 2008	Litex Lovech	4–2	Botev Plovdiv	Lovech
19:00 EEST	Popov 45'; Tom 78'; Manolev 85', 90'		Hristov 53', 63' (pen.)	Stadium: Gradski; Attendance: 1,700

== Final ==
=== Details ===
14 May 2008
18:00 EEST

Cherno More Varna	0–1	Litex Lovech
		Manolev 58'

Vasil Levski, Sofia
Attendance: 2,040
Referee: Nikolay Yordanov (Sofia)

Cherno More	Litex Lovech

== See also ==
- 2007–08 A Group
- 2007–08 B Group
