= Lúcio Wagner =

Bulgarian footballer

Personal information
- Full name: Lúcio Wagner Freitas de Souza
- Date of birth: 15 June 1976 (age 50)
- Place of birth: Rio de Janeiro, Brazil
- Height: 1.78 m (5 ft 10 in)
- Position: Left-back

Senior career*
Years	Team	Apps	(Gls)
1994	Náutico	1	(0)
1995–1998	Corinthians Alagoano	16	(1)
1996	→ Alverca (loan)	2	(0)
1997	→ Benfica (loan)	2	(0)
1997–1998	→ Sevilla (loan)	9	(0)
1998	Botafogo	19	(0)
1999	Rio Branco		
2000–2002	CA Juventus	39	(2)
2002–2010	Levski Sofia	118	(1)
2002–2003	→ Cherno More (loan)	20	(0)
Total		226	(4)

International career
2006–2008	Bulgaria	15	(0)
- * Club domestic league appearances and goals

Lúcio Wagner Freitas de Souza (born 15 June 1976), known simply as Lúcio Wagner, is a former professional footballer who played as a left-back. Achieving successes in Bulgaria, where he won eight major titles during a seven year span with Levski Sofia, he received Bulgarian citizenship in 2006 and played for their national team on 15 occasions.

== Club career ==
Born in Rio de Janeiro, Wagner started at Náutico, a club competing in the Campeonato Pernambucano. During his time there, the club was runner-up in the 1994 Pernambucano State Championship. In 1995, he signed with Corinthians Alagoano, who loans him to Benfica in 1997, together with Marcos Alemão, Cáju and Deco. After spending time at the farm team, he moved to Benfica in March 1997, making three appearances during his time in Da Luz, making his league debut on 12 April 1997 against Boavista. After the failed stint in Portugal, Corinthians loaned him to Sevilla, at the time playing in the second tier.

In 2000, Wagner joined CA Juventus in the Campeonato Paulista, playing 39 matches, scoring two goals during the two seasons there. In 2002, he moved to Cherno More in the Bulgarian league, racking up twenty league appearances in 2002–03 season, which led to a move to the larger Levski Sofia in 2003. Appearing for the first time on 8 August 2003, he would assume regular starter role, winning three league titles in 2005-06, 2006–07, 2008–09 and helping Levski reach the quarter-finals of the 2005–06 UEFA Cup where they were stopped by Schalke 04, and the group stage of the 2006–07 UEFA Champions League, after eliminating Sioni Bolnisi and Chievo, being the first Bulgarian team to do so. In 2010, the 34 year-old was released by Levski Sofia after 173 appearances for the Bulgarians.

== International career ==
In 2006, Wagner was granted Bulgarian nationality, and made his debut for the national team on 9 May, in a Kirin Cup match against Japan. He would represent Bulgaria five times during the qualifying stages of UEFA Euro 2008, and once in the qualification for the 2010 FIFA World Cup.

== Career statistics ==
Appearances and goals by club, season and competition
Club	Season	League		Cup		Europe		Total	
Club	Season	Apps	Goals	Apps	Goals	Apps	Goals	Apps	Goals
Benfica	1996–97	2	0	1	0	0	0	3	0
Levski Sofia	2003–04	21	0	5	0	5	0	31	0
Levski Sofia	2004–05	18	0	6	2	1	2	25	4
Levski Sofia	2005–06	23	0	2	0	14	0	39	0
Levski Sofia	2006–07	19	1	2	0	8	0	29	1
Levski Sofia	2007–08	14	0	0	0	2	0	16	0
Levski Sofia	2008–09	16	0	4	0	4	0	24	0
Levski Sofia	2009–10	7	0	0	0	2	0	9	0
Levski Sofia	Total	118	1	19	2	36	2	173	5
Career total		118	1	19	2	36	2	173	5

== Honours ==
Levski Sofia

- A Group: 2005-06, 2006–07, 2008–09
- Bulgarian Cup: 2004-05, 2006–07
- Bulgarian Supercup: 2005, 2007, 2009
