= Nikolay Dimitrov (footballer, born 1987) =

Bulgarian professional footballer

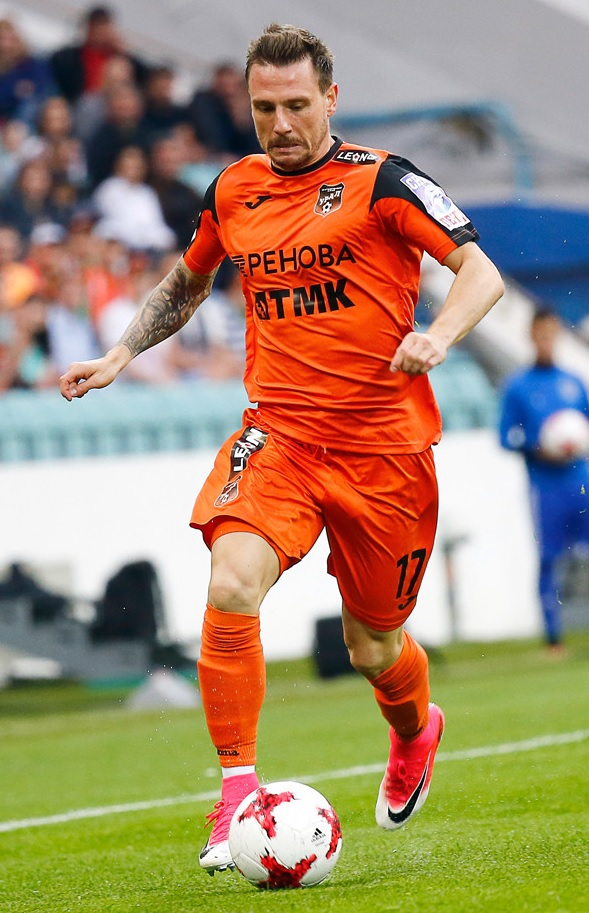
- Dimitrov with Ural in 2017

Personal information
- Full name: Nikolay Emilov Dimitrov
- Date of birth: 15 October 1987 (age 39)
- Place of birth: Ruse, Bulgaria
- Height: 1.75 m (5 ft 9 in)
- Position: Winger

Youth career
- 2000–2004: Levski Sofia

Senior career*
Years	Team	Apps	(Gls)
2004–2010	Levski Sofia	89	(18)
2010–2012	Kasımpaşa	58	(16)
2013	Samsunspor	17	(5)
2013–2014	Boluspor	25	(2)
2014–2015	Manisaspor	32	(11)
2015–2016	Skoda Xanthi	23	(2)
2016	Slavia Sofia	11	(1)
2017–2020	Ural Yekaterinburg	82	(8)

International career
2007–2008	Bulgaria U-21		
2008–2019	Bulgaria	11	(1)
- * Club domestic league appearances and goals

Nikolay Dimitrov (Bulgarian: Николай Димитров; born 15 October 1987) is a former Bulgarian professional footballer who played as a winger.

== Career ==
=== Levski Sofia ===
Born in Ruse, Nikolay Dimitrov started growing his football abilities in Levski Sofia's Youth academy. Dimitrov took his league bow for Levski in 2004–05 season, making seven substitute appearances in his first campaign. He made his senior debut on 6 August 2004, in a 3–1 win over Slavia Sofia, as an 89th-minute substitute for Emil Angelov.

In the following season Dimitrov scored his first and second goals for the club, during a 6–1 win over Rodopa Smolyan on 30 April 2006. His first start came against Belasitsa Petrich in the final game of the A PFG season on 30 May.

Dimitrov became a regular starter during the 2007–08 season. He ended that season with 8 league goals in 29 matches. With Levski Dimitrov has won three A PFG titles, two Bulgarian Cups and three Bulgarian Supercups.

=== Kasımpaşa S.K. ===
On 17 May 2010, Dimitrov together with his teammate Georgi Sarmov signed for Kasımpaşa S.K. for five years. He made his Süper Lig debut on 14 August 2010, in a 0–0 away draw against Gaziantepspor. On 27 October, Dimitrov scored a penalty in a 4–1 Turkish Cup win over Menemen Belediyespor. On 20 November, he scored his first Süper Lig goal against Gençlerbirliği. During the season, he earned 23 league appearances and scored two goals. However, Dimitrov and his Kasımpaşa teammates were relegated at the season's end.

During 2011–12 season he scored 12 goals in the TFF First League. His goals helped the team reach the promotion playoffs for the Süper Lig. On 19 May 2012, Dimitrov scored in a 2–0 away win against Konyaspor in the first leg of the play-offs semi-final. Four days later, en route to the play-off final, he scored the first goal, his fourteenth of the season, in Kasımpaşa's 3–0 home win over Konyaspor. On 27 May he played 120 minutes in the play-off Final against Adanaspor. Kasımpaşa won the match 3–2 after extra time with goals from Gökhan Güleç, Adem Büyük and Azar Karadas sending them back to the Süper Lig after a one-season absence.

=== Slavia Sofia ===
Dimitrov joined Slavia Sofia on 29 September 2016.

=== Ural Yekaterinburg ===
On 10 June 2020, his club FC Ural Yekaterinburg announced that his contract was terminated by mutual consent as Dimitrov decided to retire from playing.

== International career ==
He made his debut for Bulgaria national football team on 6 February 2008 in a friendly match against Northern Ireland, a game in which Bulgaria won with a score of 0–1. Dimitrov came on as a substitute and played during the second half of the match. In November 2016, he was recalled to the national side (after a long absence from international duty) for a 2018 World Cup qualifier against Belarus, during which he remained on the bench.

== Career statistics ==
=== Club ===
As of 1 July 2020

Club	Season	League	League		Cup		Europe		Other^{1}		Total	
Club	Season	League	Apps	Goals	Apps	Goals	Apps	Goals	Apps	Goals	Apps	Goals
Levski Sofia	2004–05	A Group	7	0	0	0	1	0	0	0	8	0
Levski Sofia	2005–06	A Group	6	2	0	0	0	0	0	0	6	2
Levski Sofia	2006–07	A Group	8	3	1	0	3	0	0	0	12	3
Levski Sofia	2007–08	A Group	29	8	2	0	1	0	0	0	32	8
Levski Sofia	2008–09	A Group	17	1	3	1	2	0	0	0	22	2
Levski Sofia	2009–10	A Group	22	4	0	0	7	0	1	0	30	4
Levski Sofia	Levski Sofia Total		89	18	6	1	14	0	1	0	110	19
Kasımpaşa	2010–11	Süper Lig	23	2	6	1	-		0	0	29	3
Kasımpaşa	2011–12	TFF First League	30	12	0	0	-		3	2	33	14
Kasımpaşa	2012–13	Süper Lig	2	0	2	2	-		0	0	4	2
Kasımpaşa	Kasımpaşa Total		55	14	8	3	0	0	3	2	66	19
Samsunspor	2012–13	TFF First League	17	5	0	0	-		0	0	17	5
Boluspor	2013–14	TFF First League	25	2	1	0	-		0	0	26	2
Manisaspor	2014–15	TFF First League	32	11	10	1	-		0	0	42	12
Skoda Xanthi	2015–16	Super League Greece	23	2	3	0	-		0	0	26	2
Slavia Sofia	2016–17	First League	11	1	0	0	0	0	0	0	11	1
Ural Yekaterinburg	2016–17	Russian Premier League	12	0	3	0	-		0	0	15	0
Ural Yekaterinburg	2017–18	Russian Premier League	25	2	0	0	-		0	0	25	2
Ural Yekaterinburg	2018–19	Russian Premier League	27	5	4	1	-		0	0	31	6
Ural Yekaterinburg	2019–20	Russian Premier League	18	1	1	1	-		0	0	19	2
Ural Yekaterinburg	Ural Yekaterinburg Total		82	8	8	2	0	0	0	0	90	10
Career Total			334	61	36	7	14	0	4	2	388	70

^{1} Includes Bulgarian Supercup matches, promotion playoffs for the Turkish Süper Lig and relegation playoffs for the Russian Premier League

=== International goals ===
Bulgaria score listed first, score column indicates score after each Dimitrov goal.

International goals by date, venue, cap, opponent, score, result and competition
No.	Date	Venue	Cap	Opponent	Score	Result	Competition
1	16 November 2018	GSP Stadium, Nicosia, Cyprus	8	Cyprus	1–1	1–1	2018–19 UEFA Nations League C

== Honours ==
=== Club ===
Levski Sofia

- A PFG: 2005–06, 2006–07, 2008–09
- Bulgarian Cup: 2006–07
- Bulgarian Supercup: 2005, 2007, 2009
