= Dimitar Mutafov =

Bulgarian footballer

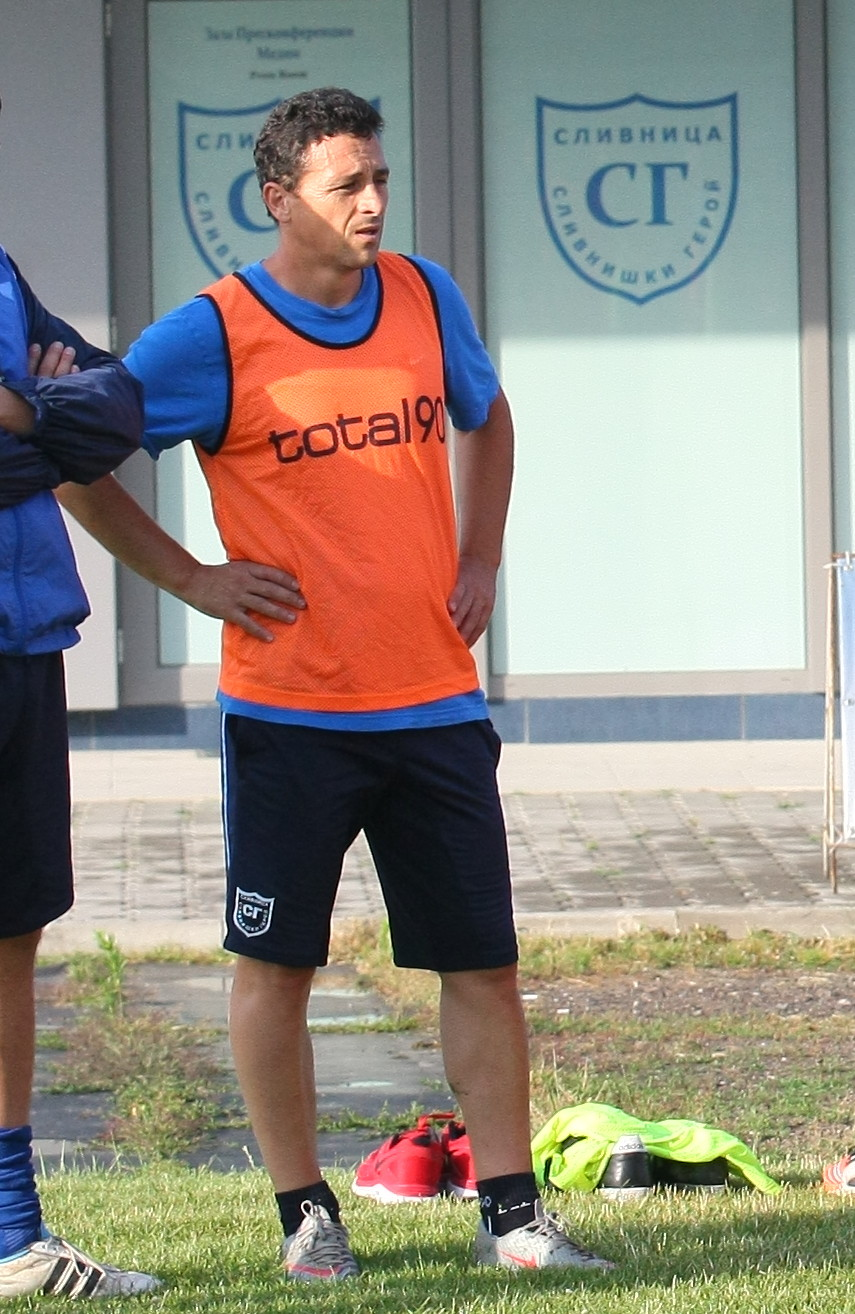
- Dimitar Mutafov

Personal information
- Full name: Dimitar Todorov Mutafov
- Date of birth: 25 November 1973 (age 52)
- Place of birth: Haskovo, Bulgaria
- Height: 1.78 m (5 ft 10 in)
- Position: Defender

Youth career
- 1983–1992: Haskovo

Senior career*
Years	Team	Apps	(Gls)
1993–1999	Haskovo	99	(11)
1999–2000	Iskar Sofia	23	(2)
2000–2001	Hebar Pazardzhik	26	(5)
2001	Belasitsa Petrich	16	(2)
2002–2003	Slavia Sofia	33	(5)
2003	Rodopa Smolyan	14	(2)
2004	Belasitsa Petrich	14	(0)
2004–2005	Marek Dupnitsa	17	(2)
2005–2006	Rodopa Smolyan	13	(0)
2006–2007	Lokomotiv 101		
2007–2008	Sportist Svoge	11	(1)
2008–2010	Minyor Pernik	31	(1)
2010–2011	Sportist Svoge	30	(1)
- * Club domestic league appearances and goals as of 30 June 2009

Dimitar Mutafov (Bulgarian: Димитър Мутафов; born 25 November 1973) is a former Bulgarian footballer.
