= Georgi Sarmov =

Bulgarian footballer

Personal information
- Full name: Georgi Zdravkov Sarmov
- Date of birth: 7 September 1985 (age 41)
- Place of birth: Burgas, Bulgaria
- Height: 1.80 m (5 ft 11 in)
- Position: Central midfielder

Senior career*
Years	Team	Apps	(Gls)
2004–2006	Naftex Burgas	43	(2)
2006–2010	Levski Sofia	80	(7)
2010–2013	Kasımpaşa	69	(0)
2013–2014	Botev Plovdiv	30	(2)
2014–2015	Levski Sofia	15	(2)
2015	Poli Timișoara	15	(0)
2016	Beroe Stara Zagora	6	(0)
2016–2017	Dacia Chișinău	24	(7)
2017–2019	Etar Veliko Tarnovo	50	(3)
2019	Chemnitzer FC	11	(0)
2020	Vitosha Bistritsa	2	(0)
2020–2021	Septemvri Sofia	19	(1)

International career
2006	Bulgaria U21	1	(0)
2008–2019	Bulgaria	15	(0)
- * Club domestic league appearances and goals

Georgi Zdravkov Sarmov (Bulgarian: Георги Здравков Сърмов; born 7 September 1985) is a Bulgarian former professional footballer who played as a central midfielder.

== Club career ==
=== Naftex ===
Between 2004 and 2006 Sarmov played for Naftex Burgas, making 43 league appearances and scoring 2 goals.

=== Levski Sofia ===
Sarmov became a Champion of Bulgaria in 2009. During 2009–10 season, Levski qualified for UEFA Europa League group stage. In 2009–10 season, Levski achieved qualifying for UEFA Europa League, becoming 3rd in the final ranking.

=== Kasımpaşa ===
On 17 May 2010, Sarmov together with his teammate Nikolay Dimitrov signed for Kasımpaşa S.K. for five years.

=== Beroe Stara Zagora ===
In January 2016, Sarmov signed with Beroe Stara Zagora.

=== Etar Veliko Tarnovo ===
On 4 August 2017, Sarmov signed with Etar Veliko Tarnovo.

=== Chemnitzer FC ===
In late April 2019, Sarmov was unveiled as the first signing of German club Chemnitzer FC for the 2019–20 season.

=== Septemvri Sofia ===
In July 2020, Sarmov joined Septemvri Sofia.

== International career ==
Sarmov debuted for Bulgaria national team on 26 March 2008 in a 2–1 win against Finland, appearing as a late substitute for Dimitar Berbatov.

== Honours ==
Levski Sofia

- Bulgarian league: 2006–07, 2008–09
- Bulgarian Cup: 2006–07
- Bulgarian Supercup: 2007, 2009
