= Todor Stoev =

Bulgarian footballer

Personal information
- Full name: Todor Penchev Stoev
- Date of birth: 11 August 1988 (age 38)
- Place of birth: Burgas, Bulgaria
- Position: Defender

Team information
- Current team: FC Chernomorets 1919 Burgas
- Number: 5

Youth career
- Levski Sofia

Senior career*
Years	Team	Apps	(Gls)
2005–2009	Levski Sofia	1	(0)
2007–2008	→ Vidima-Rakovski (loan)	16	(0)
2008–2009	→ Belasitsa Petrich (loan)	10	(0)
2009–2011	Chavdar Etropole	52	(0)
2011–2012	Neftochimic 1986	16	(1)
2012–2013	Dardania Lausanne	?	(?)
2014	Lokomotiv GO	14	(3)
2015–	FC Chernomorets 1919 Burgas	3	(3)

International career
2008–2009	Bulgaria U21		
- * Club domestic league appearances and goals as of 1 February 2015

Todor Stoev (Bulgarian: Тодор Стоев) (born on 11 August 1988) is a Bulgarian footballer who currently plays as a defender for FC Chernomorets 1919 Burgas.

== Career ==
=== Youth career ===
Stoev growth in Levski Sofia's Youth academy. He also has matches for the first team.

=== Belasitsa Petrich ===
Stoev was loaned between 27 January 2009 and June 2009. He played for Belasitsa Petrich until the end of 2008–09 season. After the end of the 08–09 season, he returned to Levski, but he was expected to be loaned again.

=== FC Chavdar Etropole ===
On 24 July 2009, Stoev was sold to FC Chavdar Etropole.
