= Zhivko Milanov =

Bulgarian footballer (born 1984)

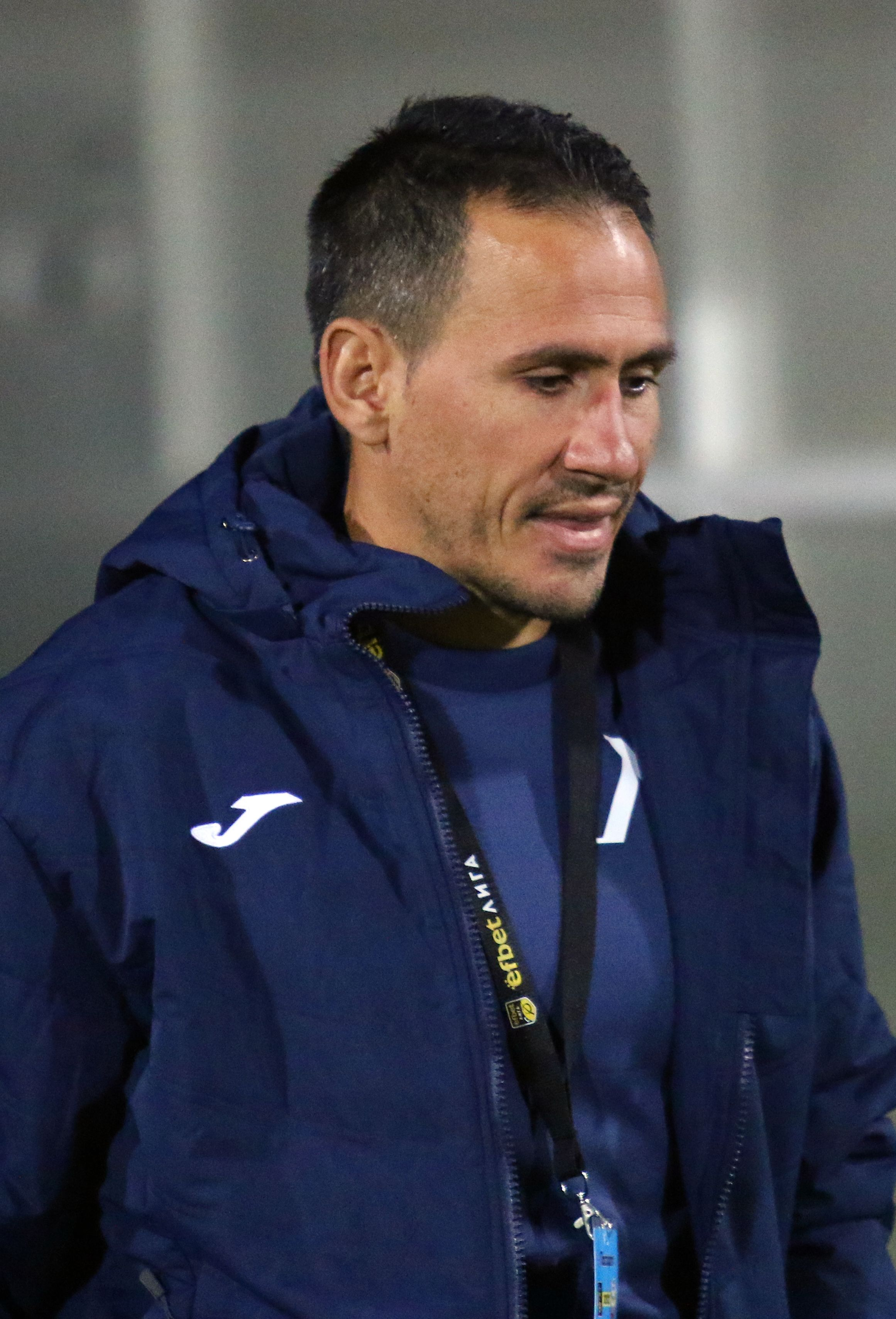
- Milanov as Levski assistant coach in 2020

Personal information
- Full name: Zhivko Kirilov Milanov
- Date of birth: 15 July 1984 (age 42)
- Place of birth: Sofia, Bulgaria
- Height: 1.77 m (5 ft 9 1/2 in)
- Position: Right back

Youth career
- 1993–2003: Levski Sofia

Senior career*
Years	Team	Apps	(Gls)
2003–2009	Levski Sofia	122	(8)
2010–2013	Vaslui	104	(1)
2013–2015	Tom Tomsk	55	(1)
2015	Levski Sofia	12	(1)
2016–2019	APOEL	50	(0)
2019–2020	Levski Sofia	34	(1)
Total		377	(12)

International career
2001	Bulgaria U16	3	(0)
2002	Bulgaria U19	2	(0)
2003–2005	Bulgaria U21	13	(0)
2006–2016	Bulgaria	28	(0)

Managerial career
- 2020–2021: Levski Sofia (assistant)
- 2021: Levski Sofia
- 2022–2023: Lokomotiv Sofia (assistant)
- 2023: Botev Plovdiv (assistant)
- 2023–2024: Krumovgrad (assistant)
- 2024: Levski Sofia (assistant)
- * Club domestic league appearances and goals

Zhivko Milanov (Bulgarian: Живко Миланов; born 15 July 1984) is a Bulgarian former professional footballer.

He was primarily deployed as a right back, but when needed he could also operate on the left side. Milanov was capped 28 times for the Bulgaria national team.

Milanov spent the majority of his playing career at Levski Sofia, but he also had several stints abroad at Vaslui, Tom Tomsk and APOEL.

After ending his playing career, in 2021 he became an assistant manager of Levski, later also spending some time as head coach of the club.

== Career ==
=== Levski Sofia ===
Milanov made his league debut in 2003. With Levski Sofia he reached the quarter finals of UEFA Cup in 2005–06. Next season, Levski Sofia reached the group-stage of UEFA Champions League, becoming the first Bulgarian team to do so.

He became a Champion of Bulgaria in 2009.

=== Vaslui ===
Milanov joined Vaslui on 14 January 2010 on a 2 1/2-year contract. The deal was reported by media to be worth $350,000. He was seen as the perfect substitute for Vaslui's captain Buhuș, whose long-term injury would keep him out from the field for the rest of the season. He made his league debut against Gaz Metan Mediaş, wearing the number 20 for Vaslui. He did not missed a single match for his new team, and helped Vaslui finishing third in Liga I, and reaching the Romanian Cup final, eventually lost at the penalty shootout. After Buhuș's departure, he established himself as Vaslui's first-choice right back.

On 23 July 2010, in Liga I's opening match, Milanov received his first red card since his arrival in Vaslui. Following Luz's long term-injury and Bălace's bad shape, Milanov was sent to play on the left side. However, because of Papp's unsuccessful try out on the right side, Milanov was sent back on his favourite position. In his second season in Vaslui, he ended third in Liga I, after a long battle, between Oţelul Galaţi, Poli Timişoara and SC Vaslui, for their first championship.

On 23 July 2011, Milanov received his second red card, in Vaslui's opening match against Rapid București. On 19 August, he scored his first goal for Vaslui, against Sparta Prague helping his team qualify for the first time to the UEFA Europa League's Group Stages.

=== Tom Tomsk ===
After his contract with Vaslui expired, Milanov joined Russian Premier League club Tom Tomsk on a free transfer on 24 June 2013. He signed a two-year contract.

=== Return to Levski Sofia ===
Milanov returned to Levski Sofia in early September 2015 and played for the Blues during the autumn part of the 2015–16 A Group, receiving praise for his performance.

=== APOEL ===
On 30 December 2015, Milanov signed an 18-month contract with Cypriot First Division champions APOEL. He made his debut on 10 January 2016, playing the full 90 minutes in APOEL's 2–1 away victory against Aris Limassol for the Cypriot First Division. A few months after joining APOEL, he crowned champion as his team managed to win the Cypriot First Division title for a fourth time in the row.

On 2 March 2017, Milanov signed a two-year contract extension with APOEL, running until 31 May 2019.

=== Third stint at Levski Sofia and retirement ===
After agreeing with APOEL to rescind his contract, Milanov returned again to Levski Sofia. On 11 February 2019 he signed a 1,5-year contract with the club.

On 23 June 2020, Milanov played his last professional match against Lokomotiv Plovdiv in a semi-final Cup tie, finishing 0-0. After the match, he stated that a lung disease made him retire on the age of 35.

== International career ==
Milanov started playing for the Bulgaria national team in 2006, and has been capped 28 times during his international career. He announced his retirement from the national team on 21 March 2017, at the age of 32.

== Career statistics ==
=== Club ===
As of 20 June 2019

Club	Season	Division	League		Cup		Europe		Other (Note: Appearances in Bulgarian Supercup and Cypriot Super Cup.)		Total	
Club	Season	Division	Apps	Goals	Apps	Goals	Apps	Goals	Apps	Goals	Apps	Goals
Levski Sofia	2002–03	A Group	4	0	1	0	0	0	—		5	0
Levski Sofia	2003–04	A Group	3	0	1	0	1	0	—		5	0
Levski Sofia	2004–05	A Group	20	1	4	0	4	0	—		28	1
Levski Sofia	2005–06	A Group	19	1	2	0	9	0	0	0	30	1
Levski Sofia	2006–07	A Group	18	1	1	0	8	0	1	0	28	1
Levski Sofia	2007–08	A Group	25	3	3	1	2	0	1	0	31	4
Levski Sofia	2008–09	A Group	23	2	4	0	4	0	—		31	2
Levski Sofia	2009–10	A Group	10	0	1	1	8	0	0	0	19	1
Levski Sofia	Total		122	8	17	2	36	0	2	0	177	10
Vaslui	2009–10	Liga I	17	0	3	0	—		—		20	0
Vaslui	2010–11	Liga I	30	0	1	0	2	0	—		33	0
Vaslui	2011–12	Liga I	27	0	2	0	10	1	—		39	1
Vaslui	2012–13	Liga I	30	1	1	0	3	0	—		34	1
Vaslui	Total		104	1	7	0	15	1	—		126	2
Tom Tomsk	2013–14	Premier Liga	28	0	3	0	—		2 (Note: Appearances in Russian Premier League relegation play-offs.)	0	33	0
Tom Tomsk	2014–15	1.Division	27	1	0	0	—		2 (Note: Appearances in Russian National Football League promotion play-offs.)	0	29	1
Tom Tomsk	Total		55	1	3	0	—		4	0	62	1
Levski Sofia	2015–16	A Group	12	1	2	0	—		—		14	1
Levski Sofia	Total		12	1	2	0	—		—		14	1
APOEL	2015–16	Cypriot First Division	16	0	6	0	—		—		22	0
APOEL	2016–17	Cypriot First Division	27	0	5	0	16	0	1	0	49	0
APOEL	2017–18	Cypriot First Division	2	0	0	0	6	0	0	0	8	0
APOEL	2018–19	Cypriot First Division	5	0	0	0	6	0	0	0	11	0
APOEL	Total		50	0	11	0	28	0	1	0	90	0
Levski Sofia	2018–19	First League	11	1	0	0	0	0	—		11	1
Levski Sofia	2019–20	First League	23	0	4	0	3	0	—		30	0
Levski Sofia	Total		34	1	4	0	3	0	—		41	1
Career total			377	12	44	2	82	1	7	0	510	15

=== International ===
As of 7 October 2016

Bulgaria
Year	Apps	Goals
2006	1	0
2007	2	0
2008	6	0
2009	5	0
2010	6	0
2011	3	0
2015	2	0
2016	3	0
Total	28	0

== Honours ==
Levski Sofia

- A PFG (3): 2005–06, 2006–07, 2008–09
- Bulgarian Cup (3): 2002–03, 2004–05, 2006–07
- Bulgarian Supercup (3): 2005, 2007, 2009

APOEL

- Cypriot First Division (4): 2015–16, 2016–17, 2017–18, 2018–19
