= Elin Topuzakov =

Bulgarian footballer and manager (born 1977)

Elin Topuzakov Елин Топузаков
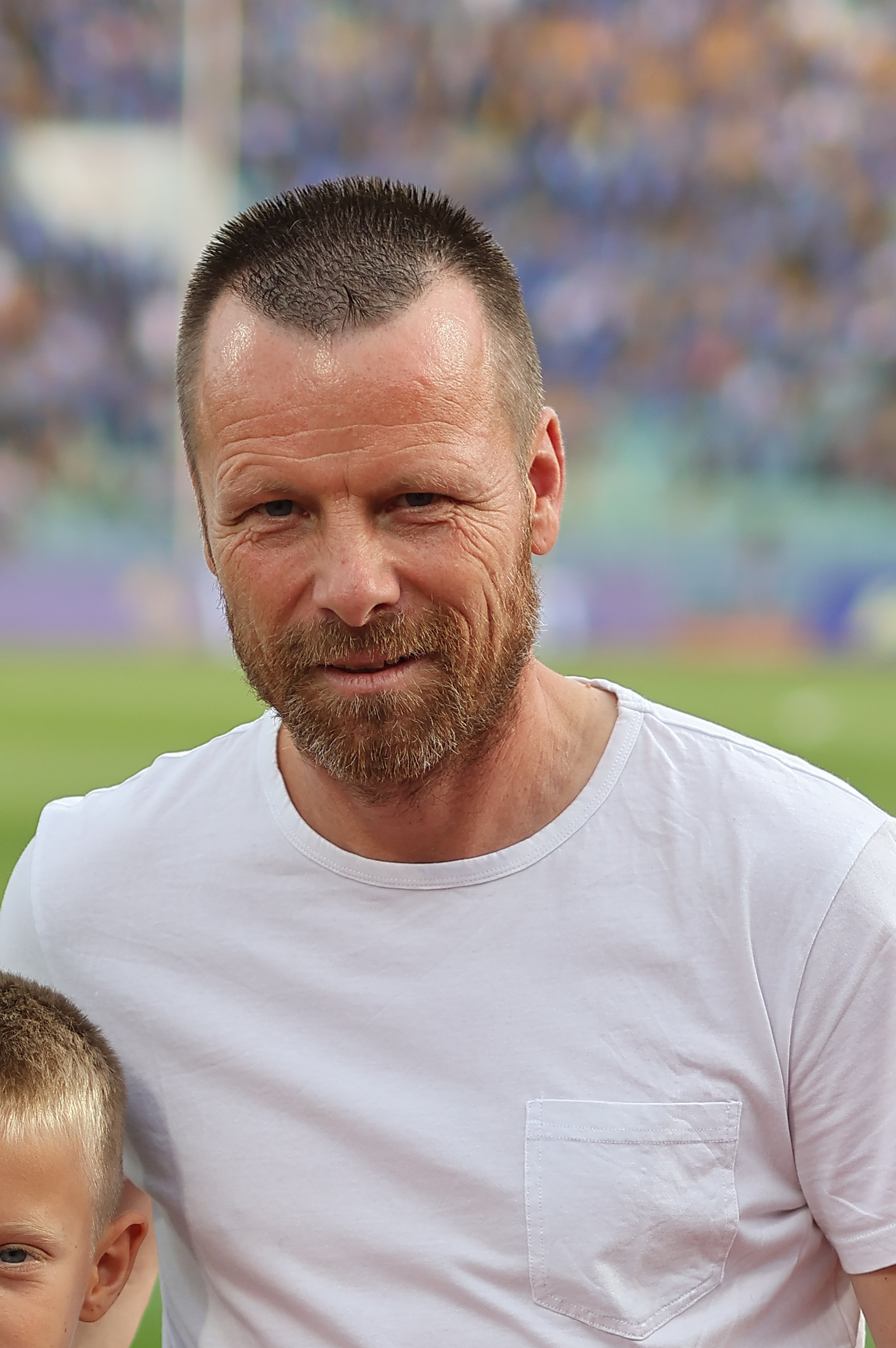

Personal information
- Full name: Elin Kalinov Topuzakov
- Date of birth: 5 February 1977 (age 49)
- Place of birth: Dimitrovgrad, Bulgaria
- Height: 1.80 m (5 ft 11 in)
- Position: Centre-back

Youth career
- 1987–1994: Dimitrovgrad

Senior career*
Years	Team	Apps	(Gls)
1995–2008	Levski Sofia	220	(19)
1999	→ Pirin (loan)	14	(2)
2008–2009	Hapoel Tel Aviv	43	(1)
2009–2010	Levski Sofia	13	(0)
2010–2011	Hapoel Ramat Gan	25	(2)
Total		321	(24)

International career
2000–2008	Bulgaria	27	(0)

Managerial career
- 2013–2014: Levski Sofia (assistant)
- 2014: Levski Sofia (caretaker)
- 2014–2016: Levski Sofia (assistant)
- 2016–2017: Levski Sofia
- 2017–2018: Arda Kardzali
- 2019–2020: Bulgaria (assistant)
- 2022–2023: Levski Sofia II
- 2023: Levski Sofia (interim)
- * Club domestic league appearances and goals as of 12 April 2013

Elin Kalinov Topuzakov (Bulgarian: Елин Калинов Топузаков; born 5 February 1977) is a Bulgarian former football defender and current manager.

He is nicknamed Balls (Bulgarian: Топчо / Topcho) because of his last name. In his career, he played as a sweeper or center back. Topuzakov also represented the Bulgaria national football team, making 27 appearances over an eight year period.

== Career ==
=== Youth career ===
Elin developed his abilities in F.C. Dimitrovgrad's Youth Academy between 1990 and 1994. He played as a striker.

=== Levski Sofia – 1st spell ===
Topuzakov joined PFC Levski Sofia in January 1996. There he was qualified as a defender. Topuzakov was among the few players who have won three consecutive titles for Levski (in 2000, 2001 and 2002). With Levski Sofia he reached 1/4 finals of UEFA Cup in 2005–06. Next season, Levski Sofia with Topuzakov, reached the group-stage of UEFA Champions League, becoming the first Bulgarian team that reached the groups. Between 2005 and 2008 he was the captain of the team.

=== Hapoel Tel Aviv ===
On 3 January 2008 Levski and Hapoel Tel Aviv agreed on the transfers of Elin Topuzakov and Dimitar Telkiyski. They signed their official contacts with Hapoel on 7 January 2008. Topuzakov chose to play with kit number 5. Both Topuzakov and Telkiyski made their debut for Hapoel Tel Aviv F.C. on 12 January 2008 against Hapoel Kfar Saba, in a 2–1 defeat. In 2008, he won the Fan's player of the year award with his teammate Dimitar Telkiyski. After 2008–2009 season end, Topuzakov became a free-agent.

=== Levski Sofia – 2nd spell ===
On 5 July 2009, Topuzakov returned Levski Sofia. Elin signed a 2-years contract. He took number 11, which at that time was worn by Georgi Hristov, but Hristov stepped it back to Topuzakov.

During 2009/2010 season, the Levski's team started their European campaign with 9:0 (on aggregate) in the second Qualifying round of Champions League against UE Sant Julià. Topuzakov re-debut for Levski on 21 July 2009 in the second match of the 2nd Qualifying round of UEFA Champions League, where Levski beaten the team of UE Sant Julià. The result of the match was 0:5 with a guest win for Levski. On the next round, Levski Sofia faced FK Baku. The blues eliminated the team from Azerbaijan with 2:0 (on aggregate). In the play-off round Levski was eliminated by Debreceni VSC with 4:1 (on aggregate). However, Levski qualified for UEFA Europa League.

In 2009/2010 season, after couple of bad games and results, Levski however achieved qualifying for UEFA Europa League becoming 3rd in the final ranking.

=== Hapoel Ramat Gan Givatayim ===
On 10 August 2010 he and his teammate Dimitar Telkiyski once again relocated to Israel, to join Hapoel Ramat Gan.

== Managerial career ==
In March 2014, Topuzakov was unveiled as the new manager of Levski Sofia when Antoni Zdravkov stepped down (mainly for health reasons).

On 16 June 2017 he was announced as the new manager of Arda Kardzhali, following PSI Group's acquisition of the club. He was released from his duties in late August 2018. In October 2019, Topuzakov joined Georgi Dermendzhiev's coaching staff, becoming assistant manager of Bulgaria.

== Playing style ==
Topuzakov has started his career as a striker, but later he was converted to a right defender. After a couple of months, he started playing as a central defender. His variety of playing skills makes him one of the most frequently scoring defenders that have ever played for Levski Sofia. Topuzakov is famous for his sliding tackles.

== Personal life ==
Topuzakov is married to Bulgarian model Vesela Toteva. Together with his wife, in 2013 he appeared on the popular Slavi's Show.

== Achievements ==
=== Notable achievements ===
Topuzakov is part of an exclusive list of players with over 20 appearances in The Eternal Derby of Bulgaria – he has participated in 23 league editions of the rivalry. He was also the player with the most appearances for (a) Bulgarian team(s) in European competitions (65) until his record was surpassed by former teammate Hristo Yovov on 19 July 2012 – in Levski Sofia's 1–0 home win over Bosnian club FK Sarajevo in a UEFA Europa League match. As of 2018, Topuzakov occupies the 4th place in the list. Together with Krasimir Bezinski and Momchil Tsvetanov he also holds the record for the most times an individual player has won the Bulgarian Cup – 6.

=== Awards ===
- (Bulgaria) Bulgarian Championship 1999–00, 2000–01, 2001–02, 2005–06, 2006–07
- (Bulgaria) Bulgarian Cup 1998, 2000, 2002, 2003, 2005, 2007
- (Bulgaria) Bulgarian Supercup 2005, 2007, 2009
- (Europe) UEFA Cup 2005-06: 1/4 finals
- (Europe) UEFA Champions League 2006-07: Group-stage
- (Israel) Fan's player of the year award 2008
