= Bulgarian Professional Football League =

BPFL
- Founded: 27 June 2007; 18 years ago
- Headquarters: Sofia, Bulgaria
- Area served: Bulgaria
- Key people: Atanas Karaivanov (President)
- Subsidiaries: See below
- Website: bpfl.bg

The Bulgarian Professional Football League (Българска професионална футболна лига) or BPFL (БПФЛ) organizes the First Professional Football League, Second Professional Football League and the Bulgarian Cup tournaments. It unifies the Bulgarian professional football clubs.
