= Dimitar Telkiyski =

Bulgarian footballer and manager

Dimitar Telkiyski Димитър Телкийски
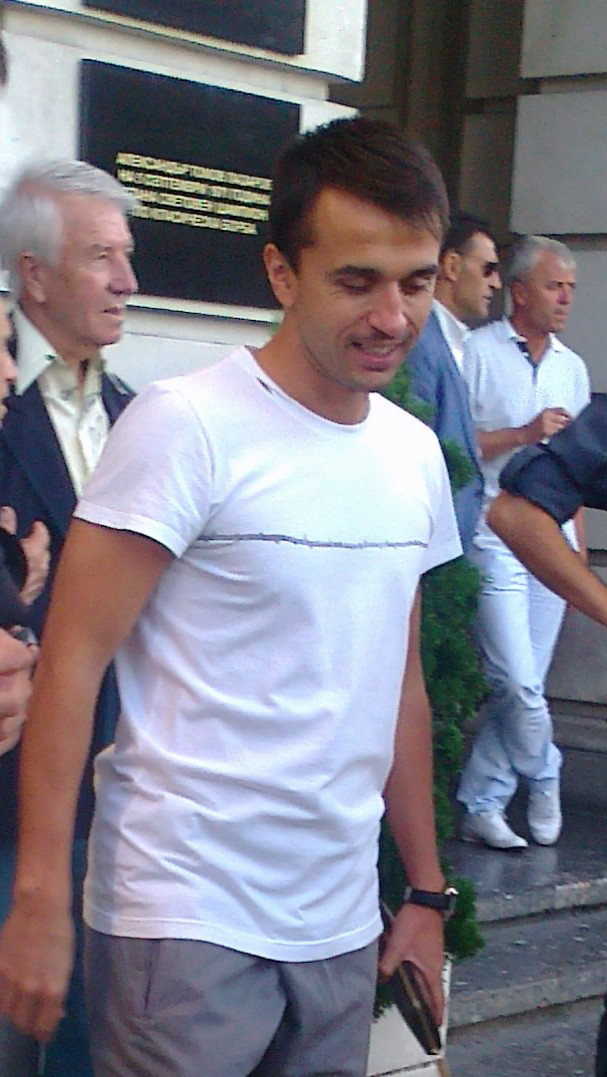

Personal information
- Full name: Dimitar Nikolaev Telkiyski
- Date of birth: 5 May 1977 (age 49)
- Place of birth: Plovdiv, Bulgaria
- Height: 1.74 m (5 ft 8 1/2 in)
- Position: Midfielder

Youth career
- 1990–1995: Botev Plovdiv

Senior career*
Years	Team	Apps	(Gls)
1995–1999	Botev Plovdiv	62	(16)
1996	→ Chirpan (loan)	17	(3)
1999–2008	Levski Sofia	199	(57)
2008–2009	Hapoel Tel Aviv	49	(8)
2009	Amkar Perm	4	(0)
2009–2010	Levski Sofia	15	(0)
2010–2011	Hapoel Ramat Gan	22	(5)
2011	Lokomotiv Sofia	7	(1)
2012	Chernomorets Burgas	4	(0)
2012–2013	Lokomotiv Sofia	15	(1)
Total		394	(91)

International career
2004–2009	Bulgaria	22	(3)

Managerial career
- 2016–2017: Levski Sofia (U19)
- 2017–2019: Oborishte (assistant)
- 2019: Levski Sofia (assistant)
- 2020: Levski Sofia (U19)
- 2021: Levski Sofia (U19)
- 2021–2023: Levski Sofia (assistant)
- * Club domestic league appearances and goals

Dimitar Telkiyski (Bulgarian: Димитър Телкийски; born 5 May 1977) is a Bulgarian football manager and a former player. His nickname is Mecho (Bulgarian: Мечо) or 'Teddybear', was given to him by the Botev Plovdiv supporters.

== Career ==
=== Botev Plovdiv ===
Telkiyski developed his abilities in Botev Plovdiv's Youth Academy between 1990 and 1996. After that, he played three years for the seniors.

=== Levski Sofia ===
He joined Levski in 1999 and won three consecutive titles. However, at this time he was used mainly as a substitute. He became a first team regular in 2003. In May 2006, Telkiyski won the Bulgarian championship with Levski for the fourth time. With Levski Sofia he reached 1/4 finals of UEFA Cup in 2005–06. Next season, Levski Sofia with Telkiyski, reached the group-stage of UEFA Champions League, becoming the first Bulgaria team that reached the groups.

=== Hapoel Tel Aviv ===
On 3 January 2008, Levski and Hapoel Tel Aviv F.C. agreed on the transfers of Elin Topuzakov and Dimitar Telkiyski. The two players went to Israel. They signed their official contacts with Hapoel on 7 January 2007. Telkiyski chose to play with kit number 31. Both Topuzakov and Telkiyski made their debut for Hapoel Tel Aviv F.C. on 12 January 2008 against Hapoel Kfar Saba. Hapoel Tel Aviv lost the match 2–1. Telkiyski scored his first goal for Hapoel against Maccabi Herzliya, in a 3–2 win. In 2008, he won the Fan's player of the year award with his teammate Elin Topuzakov.

=== Amkar Perm ===
On 18 July 2009, Telkiyski arrived in Perm, to join FC Amkar on an 18-month deal. On 9 August 2009, he made his debut for the Russian side in the 1:0 away defeat against CSKA Moscow, coming on as a substitute for Nikolai Zhilyaev in the 83rd minute.

=== Levski Sofia 2nd Period ===
On 13 October 2009, Telkiyski returned to Bulgaria to sign a contract as a free agent with his former club Levski Sofia. He took the number 32. Mecho immediately started to help his team, assisting 3 goals for 4 matches.

Dimitar ended the season with 16 appearances and 6 assistances. After couple of bad games and results, Levski however achieved qualifying for UEFA Europa League becoming 3rd in the final ranking.

On 31 May 2010, Dimitar's contract was extended to summer of 2012. For the next 10/11 season, Dimitar changed his kit number to 8.

=== Hapoel Ramat Gan ===
On 10 August 2010, Telkiyski along with his teammate Elin Topuzakov went to Israel, to join Hapoel Ramat Gan.

=== Lokomotiv Sofia ===
In October 2011 Telkiyski return to Bulgaria and sign with Lokomotiv Sofia but leaves it in early December, due to financial problems in the club.

=== Chernomorets Burgas ===
On 21 December 2011, Telkiyski signed with Chernomorets Burgas. He played only 4 games because heavy injury received on 21 March. And leaves the club in June, when his contract expired.

=== Lokomotiv Sofia ===
In June 2012 Telkiyski returned to Lokomotiv Sofia.

=== International career ===
Telkiyski made his debut for the senior national team on 17 November 2004, in the 0:0 draw with Azerbaijan in a friendly match.

== Playing style ==
Telkiyski plays as a winger or as a central midfielder. He is famous with his free-kicks and penalty kicks. His strong foot is the right one. Mecho is a fast player, who can dribble very well, which often makes him hard for marking. He makes many assists.

== Career statistics ==
=== International goals ===
#	Date	Venue	Opponent	Score	Result	Competition
1.	6 September 2006	Vasil Levski National Stadium, Sofia, Bulgaria	Slovenia	3–0	Win	Euro 2008 Q.
2.	6 June 2009	Vasil Levski National Stadium, Sofia, Bulgaria	Republic of Ireland	1–1	Draw	2010 World Cup Q.
3.	5 September 2009	Vasil Levski National Stadium, Sofia, Bulgaria	Montenegro	4–1	Win	2010 World Cup Q.
Correct as of 13 January 2013

== Coaching career ==
In 2016–17, Telkiyski served as head coach of Levski Sofia's U19 team.

On 9 June 2017, Telkiyski was appointed as assistant manager of Second League club Oborishte Panagyurishte.

== Awards ==
- (Bulgaria) Bulgarian League Champion – 2000, 2001, 2002, 2006, 2007
- (Bulgaria) Bulgarian Cup – 2000, 2002, 2003, 2005, 2007
- (Bulgaria) Bulgarian Supercup – 2005, 2007
- (Europe) 2005–06 UEFA Cup: 1/4 finals
- (Europe) 2006–07 UEFA Champions League: Group-stage
- (Israel) Fan's player of the year award – 2008
- (Israel) Goal of the year – 1st and 2nd places – 2008
