= Igor Tomašić =

Bulgarian footballer

Igor Tomašić Игор Томашич
Personal information
- Full name: Igor Tomašić
- Date of birth: 14 December 1976 (age 49)
- Place of birth: Kutina, SR Croatia, SFR Yugoslavia
- Height: 1.86 m (6 ft 1 in)
- Position: Centre-back

Youth career
- 1988–1994: Moslavina Kutina

Senior career*
Years	Team	Apps	(Gls)
1996–1997	Dinamo Zagreb	0	(0)
1997–1999	Roda JC	26	(0)
1999–2000	MVV	18	(1)
2000–2002	Roda JC	37	(2)
2002–2003	Racing Genk	24	(0)
2003–2004	Hapoel Petah Tikva	29	(1)
2004–2005	Hapoel Be'er Sheva	15	(0)
2005–2008	Levski Sofia	85	(2)
2008–2010	Maccabi Tel Aviv	42	(0)
2010–2011	Kavala	28	(1)
2011–2012	Anorthosis	13	(0)
Total		317	(7)

International career
2006–2009	Bulgaria	18	(0)
- * Club domestic league appearances and goals

Igor Tomašić (Croatian pronunciation: [îɡor tǒmaʃitɕ, - tô-]; Bulgarian: Игор Томашич, romanized: Igor Tomashich; born 14 December 1976) is a former naturalized Bulgarian footballer of Croatian ethnicity who played as a defender.

== Career ==
=== Youth career ===
His first club was Moslavina Kutina, where he trained his football abilities between 1988 and 1994.

=== Levski Sofia ===
Tomašić joined Levski on a free transfer in early 2005. He plays in the centre of defense, when there are corners or free kicks he joins his teammates in attack. With Levski Sofia he reached 1/4 finals of UEFA Cup in 2005–06. He scored the goal that put Levski through to the 1/4 finals of the UEFA Cup against Udinese AC. Next season, Levski Sofia with Tomašić, reached the group-stage of UEFA Champions League, becoming the first Bulgarian team that reached the groups.

=== Maccabi Tel Aviv F.C. ===
He left Levski Sofia on 19 May 2008 as a free agent. At the same day he became a player of the Israel side Maccabi Tel Aviv FC.

On 16 June 2010 Tomasic was released from Maccabi Tel Aviv FC.

== International career ==
Tomašić has Bulgarian citizenship and debuted for the Bulgaria national football team in the 0–0 draw against Wales in Swansea in August 2006. He has participated in Euro 2008 qualifying matches as well as in 2010 World Cup qualifiers. His final international was a June 2009 World Cup qualification match against the Republic of Ireland.

== Personal ==
Tomašić married his wife Vanessa in June 2008. The couple's first daughter, Alegra, was born on 8 August 2009. He also has another daughter and a son who was born in 2013.

== Honours ==
- Bulgarian Cup 2005, 2007
- Champion of Bulgaria 2006, 2007
- Bulgarian Supercup 2005, 2007
- UEFA Cup 2005-06: 1/4 finals
- UEFA Champions League 2006-07: Group-stage
- Toto Cup 2009
