= Ekundayo Jayeoba =

Nigerian footballer

Personal information
- Full name: Ekundayo Jaiyeoba
- Date of birth: 4 April 1980 (age 46)
- Place of birth: Lagos, Nigeria
- Height: 1.82 m (5 ft 11 1/2 in)
- Position: Striker

Youth career
- NEPA Lagos

Senior career*
Years	Team	Apps	(Gls)
2000–2001	Velbazhd Kyustendil	26	(5)
2001–2005	Lokomotiv Plovdiv	86	(19)
2005–2008	Levski Sofia	24	(12)
2008	→ Maccabi Herzliya (loan)	11	(2)
2008	Chernomorets Burgas	13	(1)
2009–2010	Vihren Sandanski	37	(9)
2010–2011	Etar 1924	27	(2)
2011	Dorostol Silistra	6	(0)
2012–2013	Marek Dupnitsa		
2013–2017	Strumska Slava		
2018–2019	Granit Vladaya		
2019–2021	Levski Chepintsi		
2021–2022	PFC Dragoman		

Managerial career
- 2019–2021: Levski Chepintsi (player-manager)
- 2021–2022: PFC Dragoman (player-assistant)
- * Club domestic league appearances and goals

Ekundayo Jaiyeoba (born 4 April 1980) is a Nigerian football player who played as a striker. He played in the Bulgarian First League for Lokomotiv Plovdiv. As well as playing in Bulgaria, Jaiyeoba spent time on loan at Israeli side Maccabi Herzliya for the second half of the 2007–08 season.

== Club career ==
2003-04: Helped Lokomotiv Plovdiv win the Bulgarian APFG League championship with nine goals in 26 appearances.

2004: Featured for Lokomotiv Plovdiv in their UEFA Champions League second round qualifier, as they got eliminated by Belgian side Club Brugge.

2004-05: Started the season with Lokomotiv Plovdiv but later joined another Premier League club Levski Sofia. Signed a three-and-a-half-year contract for €150,000. Teamed up with fellow Nigerian Richard Eromoigbe.

2005-06: Sidelined for six months after suffering an Achilles tendon injury in a UEFA Cup first round qualifying game against Slovenian club NK Publikum.

2006-07: Helped Levski Sofia to join at UEFA Champions League Group stage.

2007-08: He started the season with Levski Sofia. On 31 January 2008 he joined Israeli side Maccabi Herzliya on loan until the end of the season.

2008: After playing on loan at Maccabi Herzilya, Levski sold him to Chernomorets in the Bulgarian League.

2009: After several months in Burgas, he is loaned by Vihren Sandanski and later bought.

2010: In June his contract with Vihren expired and he left gladiators to join ambitious Etar 1924.

In March 2012, Jayeoba joined Marek Dupnitsa. In August 2013, he then moved to Strumska Slava. In March 2018, he signe for Granit Vladaya.

In August 2019, Jayeoba was appointed player-manager of Levski Chepintsi. However, he was sacked in August 2021. In September 2021, he signed for PFC Dragoman as a playing assistant coach.
