= Emil Angelov =

Bulgarian footballer

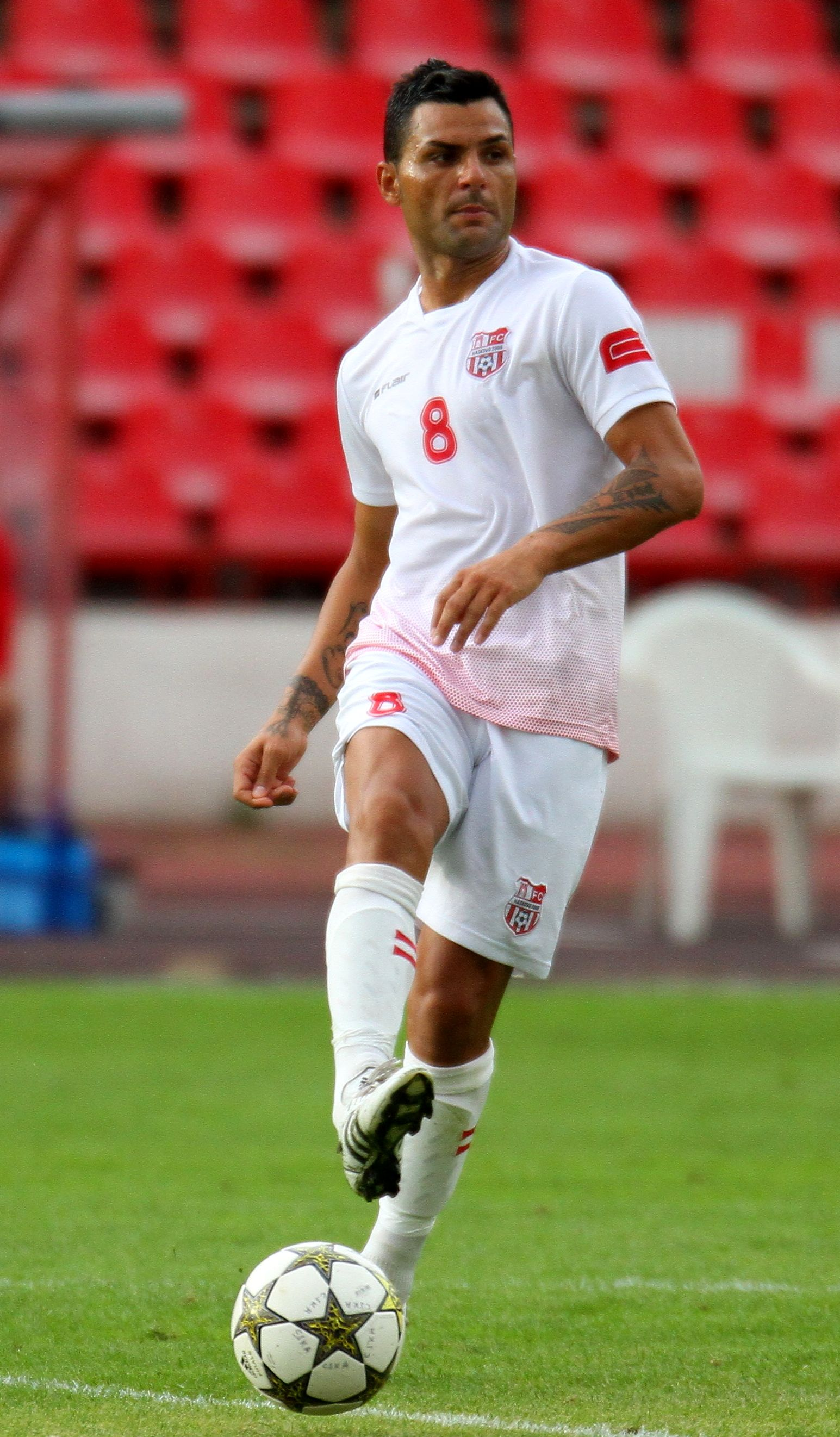

Personal information
- Full name: Emil Rosenov Angelov
- Date of birth: 17 July 1980 (age 46)
- Place of birth: Haskovo, Bulgaria
- Height: 1.83 m (6 ft 0 in)
- Position: Forward

Youth career
- –1999: Svilengrad

Senior career*
Years	Team	Apps	(Gls)
1999–2001	Svilengrad	28	(18)
2001–2003	Chernomorets Burgas	55	(18)
2004–2008	Levski Sofia	79	(53)
2005	Dalian Shide (loan)	2	(1)
2006	Energie Cottbus (loan)	1	(0)
2009–2010	Litex Lovech	26	(4)
2010–2011	Denizlispor	43	(21)
2011–2012	Karabükspor	21	(2)
2012	Anorthosis Famagusta	2	(2)
2012–2013	Beroe Stara Zagora	21	(17)
2013–2014	Konyaspor	1	(0)
2014	Beroe Stara Zagora	3	(0)
2014–2015	Haskovo	32	(21)
Total		311	(170)

International career
2006–2008	Bulgaria	2	(0)
- * Club domestic league appearances and goals

Emil Rosenov Angelov (Bulgarian: Емил Росенов Ангелов; born on 17 July 1980 in Haskovo) is a former Bulgarian footballer who played as a forward.

== Career ==
His career began at Svilengrad, having played for Haskovo as a youth. In 2001 Angelov joined Chernomorets Burgas. In his two and a half-year stint with the team, he played 55 games scoring 18 goals in the Bulgarian A PFG.

=== Levski Sofia ===
Angelov joined Levski Sofia on 24 January 2004 on a four-year contract for a transfer fee of €140,000. He made his league debut for Levski on 14 February and scored his first goal in the process, netting Levski's third of a 3–0 victory over Chernomorets Burgas.

Angelov scored his first-ever European goal on 12 August 2004, in a 5–0 home win over Modriča in their UEFA Cup second qualifying round first leg tie.

=== Litex Lovech ===
On 8 January 2008 Angelov was bought by Litex Lovech. He made his debut for Litex on 18 January 2008 in a friendly match against Al-Karamah which ended in a draw. Angelov played during the second half of the match.

His first goal for Litex was on 13 February 2008 against JEF United Ichihara Chiba. He scored it in 85th minute. The result of the match was 2:1 win for Litex.

Emil Angelov made his official debut for Litex on 1 March 2008 against CSKA Sofia. The result of the match was 0:0 with a guest draw for Litex.

=== Denizlispor ===
In 2009, he signed with Süper Lig club Denizlispor.

=== Karabükspor ===
In 2010, he signed with Süper Lig club Karabükspor.

=== Anorthosis ===
On 10 July 2011, Angelov signed for Cypriot First Division side Anorthosis Famagusta on a one-year deal. Few hours later, he made his first appearance for Anorthosis in a 2–0 friendly win over Lokomotiv Plovdiv. Angelov made his competitive debut on 28 July, in a 0–2 home loss against Rabotnički Skopje in the third qualifying round of the Europa League, coming on as a substitute for Ricardo Laborde.

=== Haskovo ===
In 2013, Angelov joined his hometown club Haskovo. He announced his retirement from football in January 2015 and joined the coaching staff, becoming assistant to Emil Velev.

== International career ==
On 1 March 2006, Angelov made his debut for Bulgaria in the friendly match against Macedonia.

== Honours ==
Levski Sofia

- Bulgarian A PFG: 2005–06, 2006–07
- Bulgarian Cup: 2004–05, 2006–07
- Bulgarian Supercup: 2005, 2007

Litex Lovech

- Bulgarian Cup: 2008–09

Beroe Stara Zagora

- Bulgarian Cup: 2012–13
- Bulgarian Supercup: 2013

== Career statistics ==
=== Club ===
As of 31 October 2012

Club	Season	League		Cup		Europe		Total	
Club	Season	Apps	Goals	Apps	Goals	Apps	Goals	Apps	Goals
Chernomorets Burgas	2001–02	29	12	0	0	–		29	12
Chernomorets Burgas	2002–03	14	1	4	0	–		18	1
Chernomorets Burgas	2003–04	12	5	2	0	–		14	5
Chernomorets Burgas	Total	55	18	6	0	0	0	61	18
Levski Sofia	2003–04	13	3	0	0	0	0	13	3
Levski Sofia	2004–05	26	11	2	0	3	1	31	12
Levski Sofia	2005–06	21	6	2	2	12	5	35	13
Levski Sofia	2006–07	19	9	3	0	6	2	28	11
Levski Sofia	2007–08	0	0	0	0	0	0	0	0
Levski Sofia	Total	79	29	7	2	21	8	107	39
Litex Lovech	2007–08	11	2	2	0	0	0	13	2
Litex Lovech	2008–09	15	2	2	0	4	0	21	2
Litex Lovech	Total	26	4	4	0	4	0	34	4
Denizlispor	2008–09	15	6	1	1	–		16	7
Denizlispor	2009–10	28	5	7	6	–		35	11
Denizlispor	Total	43	11	8	7	0	0	51	18
Karabükspor	2010–11	21	2	1	0	–		22	2
Anorthosis Famagusta	2011–12	0	0	0	0	2	0	2	0
Beroe Stara Zagora	2011–12	21	6	0	0	–		21	6
Konyaspor	2012–13	1	0	0	0	–		1	0
Career total		246	70	26	9	27	8	299	87
