= Bulgarian Supercup =

Supercup football match of Bulgaria

Bulgarian Football Supercup
- Founded: 1989; 37 years ago 2004; (restored)
- Country: Bulgaria
- Confederation: UEFA
- Number of clubs: 2
- Current champions: PFC CSKA Sofia (5th title)
- Most championships: Ludogorets Razgrad (9 titles)

The Bulgarian Supercup (Bulgarian: Суперкупа на България) is the trophy won in a football match held between the football club that has won the Bulgarian first football division in the season that ended in the year of the match and the holder of the Bulgarian Cup at that time. In case the champion of Bulgaria has also won the cup, the Bulgarian Cup finalist competes with the champion in the match for the trophy.

The Supercup match is usually held during the weekend before the start of a new season. Since 2004, the Supercup game has been an annual event. The most successful club in the event is Ludogorets Razgrad with nine Supercup titles and four times being runners-up. Ludogorets is also the club that has participated in most seasons of the Supercup with thirteen appearances.

== History ==
=== Inaugural Event 1989 ===
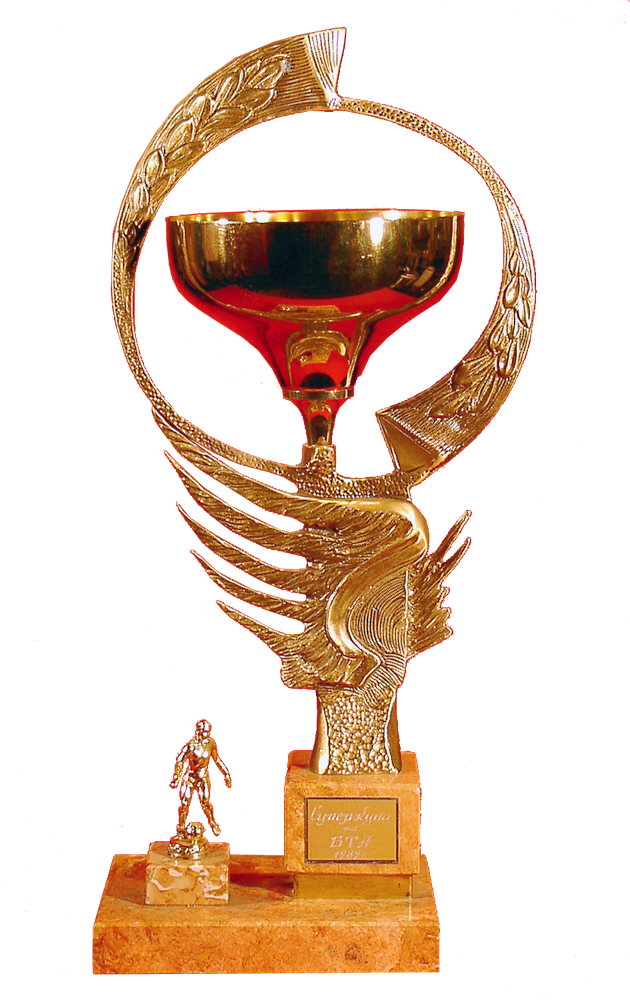
Bulgarian Supercup 1989

The first match for the Bulgarian Supercup was held in 1989. The match was proposed by Kiril Zaharinov, sports editor at the Bulgarian News Agency and secretary of the union of the Bulgarian sport journalists at that time.

The match was held at 9th September Stadium in Burgas, opposing 1988–89 Bulgarian champion and Cup holder CFKA Sredets (now CSKA Sofia) and the runner-up in the 1988–89 edition of the Bulgarian Cup Chernomorets Burgas. CSKA won the match 1-0 thanks to a goal by Hristo Stoichkov.

The first Supercup trophy was made in Italy and was 80 cm tall, weighing 15 kg. Today it is kept in the CSKA Sofia museum.

=== Since 2004 ===
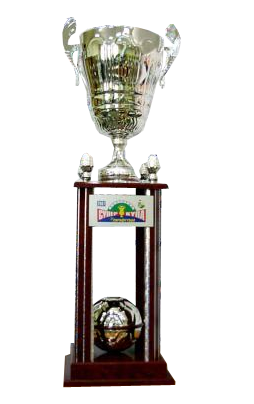
Bulgarian Supercup (2007–2010)

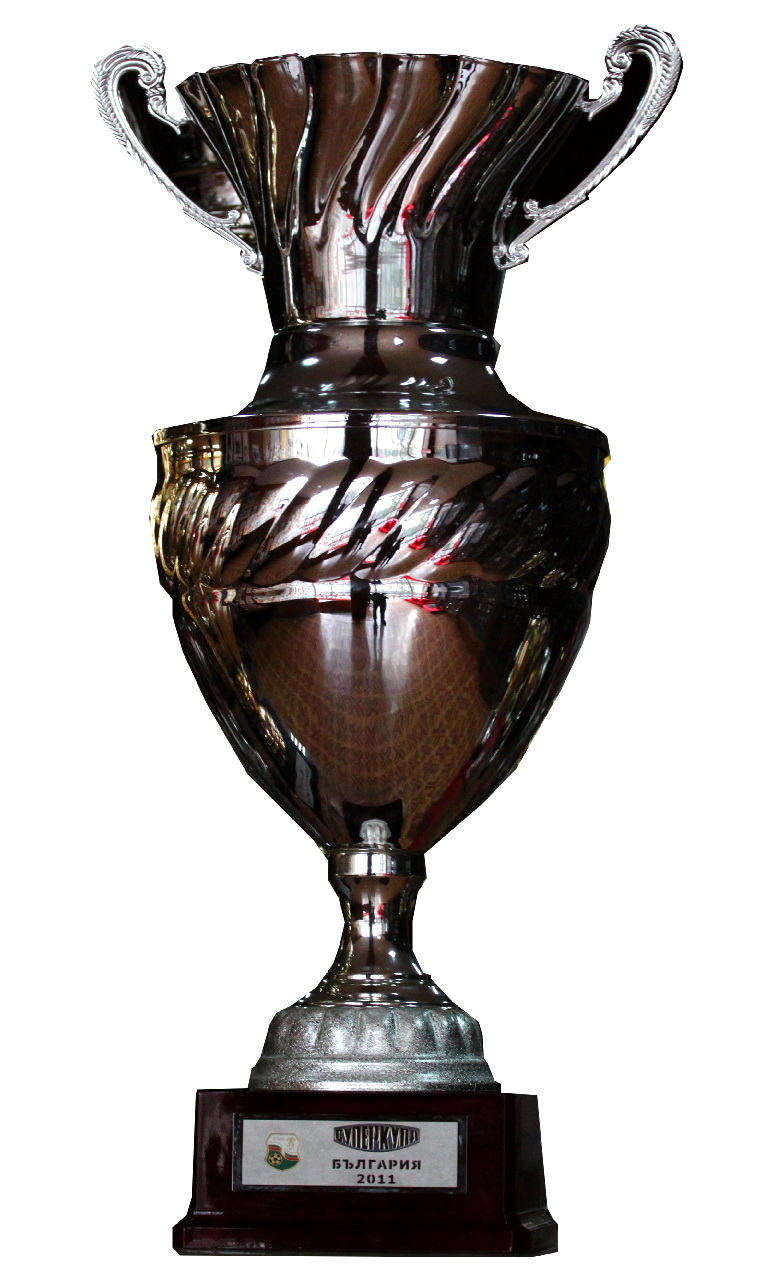
Bulgarian Supercup (2011–2017)

After the political changes of 1989 in Eastern Europe the Bulgarian Supercup match was suspended. Fourteen years later the Bulgarian Professional Football League in association with the Bulgarian Football Union decided to restore the event organising a Supercup match between the champion of the 2003–04 season, PFC Lokomotiv Plovdiv and the 2003–04 Bulgarian Cup holder, PFC Litex Lovech. The match was held at Naftex Stadium in Burgas and Lokomotiv won 1–0 after a last-minute goal by Ivan Paskov.

Since the restoration of the tournament in 2004 ten teams have participated in the event and eight of them have managed to win the trophy – PFC Litex Lovech (winners in 2010), PFC Beroe Stara Zagora (winners in 2013), PFC Cherno More Varna (winners in 2015), PFC Botev Plovdiv (winners in 2017), Lokomotiv Plovdiv (winners in 2004 and 2020), PFC Levski Sofia (winners in 2005, 2007 and 2009), PFC CSKA Sofia (winners in 2006, 2008 and 2011) and PFC Ludogorets Razgrad (winners in 2012, 2014, 2018, 2019, 2021).

In 2021 the winner of the cup Ludogorets Razgrad became the single most successful team in the event, winning their fifth trophy as they beat CSKA Sofia with final score 4–0. Also, as of 2021 Ludogorets Razgrad has participated nine times in the Supercup match – most of all other participants.

From 2004 onwards a brand new trophy is made for every event as it was decided by the organisers that each Supercup winner should retain the trophy in perpetuity. However, three designs have been used for the trophy as of 2004 – one for the Supercups of 2004–2006, another for the trophies of 2007-2010 and the third from 2011 onwards. The current trophy was designed in Italy in 2007 and is 100 cm tall.

== Supercup finals ==
Season	Date	Winner	Score	Runner-up	Venue	Attendance	Report
1989	15 July 1989	CFKA Sredets (1); Winner of 1988–89 A Group and 1988–89 Bulgarian Cup	1–0	Chernomorets Burgas; Runner-up of 1988–89 Bulgarian Cup	9th September Stadium, Burgas	20,000	Report
1990–2003	Not played						
2004	31 July 2004	Lokomotiv Plovdiv (1); Winner of 2003–04 A Group	1–0	Litex; Winner of 2003–04 Bulgarian Cup	Naftex Stadium, Burgas	4,300	Report
2005	31 July 2005	Levski Sofia (1); Winner of 2004–05 Bulgarian Cup	1–1 (a.e.t.) (3–1 p)	CSKA Sofia; Winner of 2004–05 A Group	Vasil Levski, Sofia	9,894	Report
2006	30 July 2006	CSKA Sofia (2); Winner of 2005–06 Bulgarian Cup	0–0 (a.e.t.) (3–0 p)	Levski Sofia; Winner of 2005–06 A Group	Vasil Levski, Sofia	9,751	Report
2007	26 July 2007	Levski Sofia (2); Winner of 2006–07 A Group and 2006–07 Bulgarian Cup	2–1 (a.e.t.)	Litex; Runner-up of 2006–07 Bulgarian Cup	Vasil Levski, Sofia	14,000	Report
2008	3 August 2008	CSKA Sofia (3); Winner of 2007–08 A Group	1–0	Litex; Winner of 2007–08 Bulgarian Cup	Vasil Levski, Sofia	8,950	Report
2009	1 August 2009	Levski Sofia (3); Winner of 2008–09 A Group	1–0	Litex; Winner of 2008–09 Bulgarian Cup	Vasil Levski, Sofia	2,300	Report
2010	12 August 2010	Litex (1); Winner of 2009–10 A Group	2–1 (a.e.t.)	Beroe; Winner of 2009–10 Bulgarian Cup	Vasil Levski, Sofia	1,700	Report
2011	30 July 2011	CSKA Sofia (4); Winner of 2010–11 Bulgarian Cup	3–1	Litex; Winner of 2010–11 A Group	Lazur Stadium, Burgas	12,620	Report
2012	11 July 2012	Ludogorets Razgrad (1); Winner of 2011–12 A Group and 2011–12 Bulgarian Cup	3–1	Lokomotiv Plovdiv; Runner-up of 2011–12 Bulgarian Cup	Lazur Stadium, Burgas	2,730	Report
2013	10 July 2013	Beroe (1); Winner of 2012–13 Bulgarian Cup	1–1 (a.e.t.) (5–3 p)	Ludogorets Razgrad; Winner of 2012–13 A Group	Vasil Levski, Sofia	1,070	Report
2014	13 August 2014	Ludogorets Razgrad (2); Winner of 2013–14 A Group and 2013–14 Bulgarian Cup	3–1	Botev Plovdiv; Runner-up of 2013–14 Bulgarian Cup	Lazur Stadium, Burgas	4,400	Report
2015	12 August 2015	Cherno More (1); Winner of 2014–15 Bulgarian Cup	1–0	Ludogorets Razgrad; Winner of 2014–15 A Group	Lazur Stadium, Burgas	1,810	Report
2016	Not played §						
2017	9 August 2017	Botev Plovdiv (1); Winner of 2016–17 Bulgarian Cup	1–1 (5–4 p)	Ludogorets Razgrad; Winner of 2016–17 First League	Lazur Stadium, Burgas	3,800	Report
2018	5 July 2018	Ludogorets Razgrad (3); Winner of 2017–18 First League	1–0	Slavia Sofia; Winner of 2017–18 Bulgarian Cup	Trace Arena, Stara Zagora	850	Report
2019	3 July 2019	Ludogorets Razgrad (4); Winner of 2018–19 First League	2–0	Lokomotiv Plovdiv; Winner of 2018–19 Bulgarian Cup	Vasil Levski, Sofia	3,800	Report
2020	2 August 2020	Lokomotiv Plovdiv (2); Winner of 2019–20 Bulgarian Cup	1–0	Ludogorets Razgrad; Winner of 2019–20 First League	Huvepharma Arena, Razgrad	0	Report
2021	17 July 2021	Ludogorets Razgrad (5); Winner of 2020–21 First League	4–0	CSKA Sofia; Winner of 2020–21 Bulgarian Cup	Vasil Levski, Sofia	8,800	Report
2022	1 September 2022	Ludogorets Razgrad (6); Winner of 2021–22 First League	2–2 (4–3 p)	Levski Sofia; Winner of 2021–22 Bulgarian Cup	Vasil Levski, Sofia	21,342	Report
2023	10 February 2024	Ludogorets Razgrad (7); Winner of 2022–23 First League	1–1 (4–2 p)	CSKA 1948 Sofia; Runner-up of 2022–23 Bulgarian Cup	Stadion Ivaylo, Veliko Tarnovo	1,344	Report
2024	4 February 2025	Ludogorets Razgrad (8); Winner of 2023–24 First League	3–2	Botev Plovdiv; Winner of 2023–24 Bulgarian Cup	Stadion Hristo Botev, Plovdiv	6,777	Report
2025	3 February 2026	Ludogorets Razgrad (9); Winner of 2024–25 First League	1–0	Levski Sofia; Runner-up of 2024–25 First League	Vasil Levski, Sofia	14,000	Report
2026	9 September 2026	CSKA Sofia (5); Winner of 2025–26 Bulgarian Cup	4–2	Levski Sofia; Winner of 2025–26 First League	Vasil Levski, Sofia	27,345	Report

§ Note: The 2016 Bulgarian Supercup was meant to be the 14th Bulgarian Supercup. The game was to be played between CSKA Sofia, winners of the 2016 Bulgarian Cup, and Ludogorets Razgrad, champions of the 2015–16 A PFG. However, prior to the match CSKA Sofia went into bankruptcy, followed by taking another team's professional license. As a consequence, the 2016 Bulgarian Supercup final was not held.

== Performance ==
=== Performance by club ===
Club	Winners	Runners-up	Year(s) Won	Year(s) lost
Ludogorets Razgrad	9	4	2012, 2014, 2018, 2019, 2021, 2022, 2023, 2024, 2025	2013, 2015, 2017, 2020
CSKA Sofia	5	2	1989, 2006, 2008, 2011, 2026	2005, 2021
Levski Sofia	3	4	2005, 2007, 2009	2006, 2022, 2025, 2026
Lokomotiv Plovdiv	2	2	2004, 2020	2012, 2019
Lovech	1	5	2010	2004, 2007, 2008, 2009, 2011
Botev Plovdiv	1	2	2017	2014, 2024
Beroe Stara Zagora	1	1	2013	2010
Cherno More Varna	1	–	2015	–
Chernomorets Burgas	–	1	–	1989
Slavia Sofia	–	1	–	2018
CSKA 1948 Sofia	–	1	–	2023

=== Performance by city ===
City	Wins	Clubs
Razgrad	9	Ludogorets (9)
Sofia	8	CSKA (5), Levski (3)
Plovdiv	3	Lokomotiv (2), Botev (1)
Lovech	1	Litex (1)
Stara Zagora	1	Beroe (1)
Varna	1	Cherno More (1)
