= Miroslav Ivanov (footballer) =

Bulgarian footballer

Personal information
- Full name: Miroslav Lyubomirov Ivanov
- Date of birth: 9 November 1981 (age 44)
- Place of birth: Gabrovo, Bulgaria
- Height: 1.64 m (5 ft 4 1/2 in)
- Positions: Attacking midfielder; winger

Senior career*
Years	Team	Apps	(Gls)
1998–2003	Yantra Gabrovo	-	(-)
2003–2004	Shumen	29	(8)
2005–2009	Levski Sofia	88	(11)
2009–2010	Montana	36	(3)
2011–2013	Ludogorets Razgrad	67	(10)
2013–2014	Levski Sofia	19	(3)
2015	Lokomotiv GO	11	(1)
2015	Etar Veliko Tarnovo	3	(1)
2016	Sevlievo	22	(9)

Managerial career
- 2017–: Etar Veliko Tarnovo (assistant)
- * Club domestic league appearances and goals

Miroslav Ivanov (Bulgarian: Мирослав Иванов; born 9 November 1981 in Gabrovo) is a former Bulgarian footballer who played as a midfielder.

== Career ==
=== Beginning ===
He began his career in his hometown as player of Yantra Gabrovo. Then he was transferred to FC Shumen.

=== Levski Sofia ===
He signed for Levski Sofia in early 2005. During the second part of 2004/2005 season he was used mainly as a substitute and he made 8 appearances, scoring 2 goals (for the 2–1 victory over Bulgarian side PFC Cherno More Varna in a match played on Georgi Asparuhov Stadium). In 2005/2006 season he took part in 19 games, scoring 1 goal. He scored a goal against the Dutch side SC Heerenveen in UEFA Cup match during 2005/2006 season (Levski lost 1–2). In the beginning of the 2006/2007 season he again is a rare starter. He became a Champion of Bulgaria in 2009.

=== PFC Montana ===
On 30 June 2009, just a day before his contract expired, Ivanov was sold to PFC Montana.

=== Ludogorets Razgrad ===
In February 2011, Ivanov signed a contract with Ludogorets Razgrad. He established himself as first choice under manager Ivaylo Petev during Ludogorets' maiden season in the A PFG. On 23 May 2012, in the last league match of the season Ivanov scored the only goal in the 1:0 win over CSKA Sofia from a free kick, which enabled the team from Razgrad to claim the first A PFG title in its history.

== Honours ==
Levski Sofia

- A PFG: 2005–06, 2006–07, 2008–09
- Bulgarian Cup: 2004–05, 2006–07
- Bulgarian Supercup: 2005, 2007

Ludogorets Razgrad

- Bulgarian A PFG: 2011–12, 2012–13
- Bulgarian Cup: 2012
- Bulgarian Supercup 2012
