= 2000 Bulgarian Cup final =

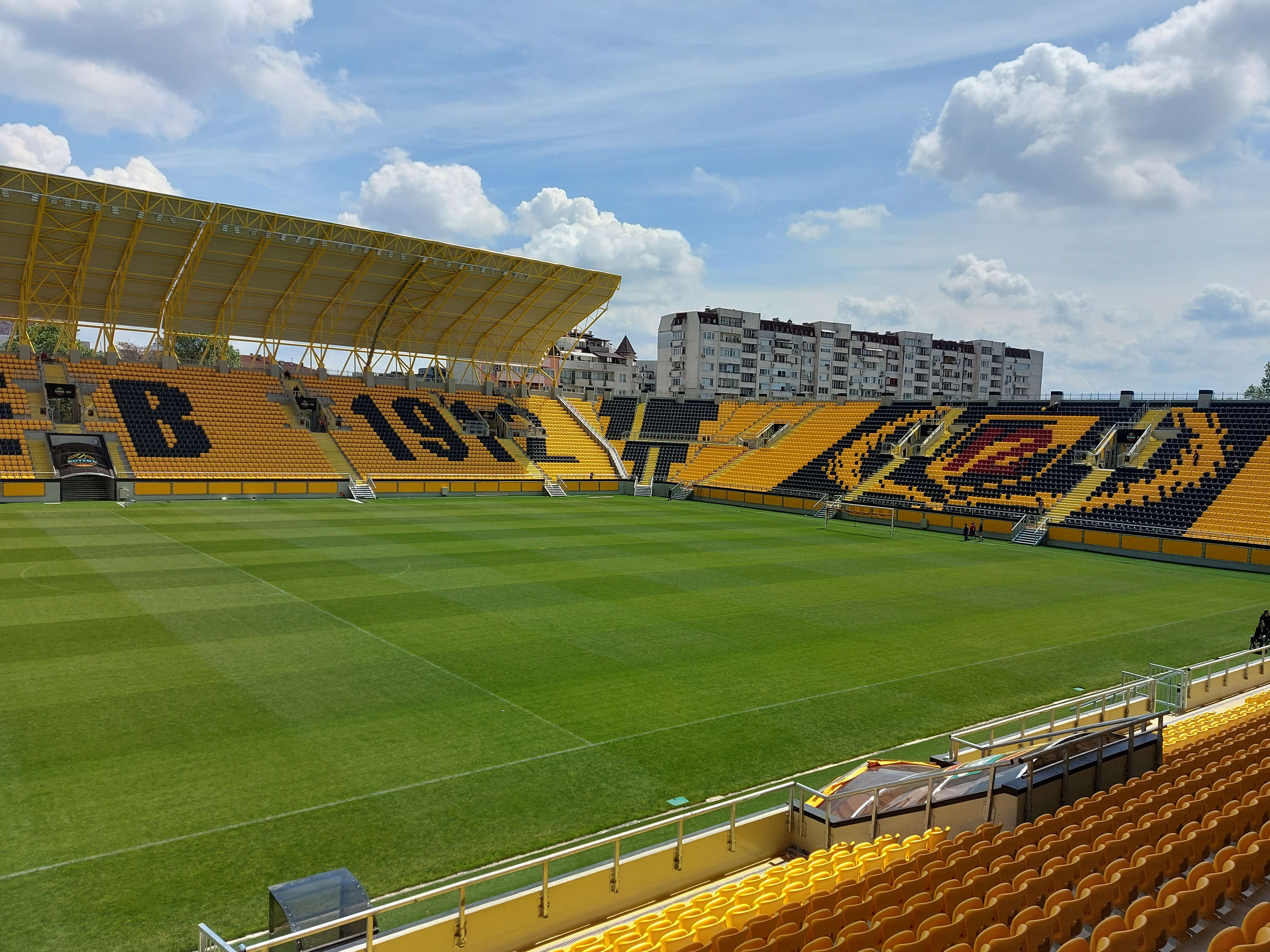
- Event: 1999–00 Bulgarian Cup
Neftochimic Burgas	Levski Sofia
A Group	A Group
0	2
- Date: 31 May 2000
- Venue: Stadion Hristo Botev, Plovdiv
- Man of the Match: Georgi Ivanov
- Referee: Anton Genov
- Attendance: 18,000

The 2000 Bulgarian Cup final was played at the Hristo Botev Stadium in Plovdiv on 31 May 2000 and was contested between the sides of Neftochimic Burgas and Levski Sofia. The match was won by Levski Sofia.

== Match ==
=== Details ===
31 May 2000
18:00 EEST

Neftochimic Burgas	0–2	Levski Sofia
	Report	G. Ivanov 87'; B. Ivanov 90+2'

Stadion Hristo Botev, Plovdiv
Attendance: 18,000
Referee: Anton Genov (Gabrovo)

Neftochimic	Levski

Neftochimic:
GK	21	(Bulgaria) Yordan Gospodinov
DF	2	(Bulgaria) Malin Orachev (substituted off) 77'
DF	3	(Bulgaria) Veselin Branimirov (yellow card)
DF	5	(Bulgaria) Veliyan Parushev (c)
DF	6	(Bulgaria) Daniel Hristov
MF	4	(Bulgaria) Said Ibraimov (substituted off) 88'
MF	7	(Bulgaria) Todor Yanchev
MF	8	(Bulgaria) Stanimir Dimitrov (yellow card)
MF	10	(Bulgaria) Todor Kiselichkov
MF	11	(Bulgaria) Iliya Gruev
FW	9	(Bulgaria) Georgi Chilikov (yellow card)
Substitutes:
DF	14	(Bulgaria) Rosen Petrov (substituted on) 77'
MF	20	(Bulgaria) Dian Petkov (substituted on) 88'
Manager:
(Bulgaria) Dimitar Stoychev

Levski:
GK	1	(Bulgaria) Dimitar Ivankov
DF	11	(Bulgaria) Elin Topuzakov (yellow card)
DF	3	(Bulgaria) Stanimir Stoilov (c)
DF	6	(Scotland) John Inglis (yellow card)
DF	24	(Bulgaria) Predrag Pažin
MF	4	(Bulgaria) Biser Ivanov
MF	7	(Bulgaria) Aleksandar Aleksandrov (substituted off) 89'
MF	21	(Bulgaria) Zahari Sirakov
MF	22	(Bulgaria) Dimitar Telkiyski (substituted off) 46'
FW	9	(Bulgaria) Georgi Ivanov (yellow card)
FW	15	(Bulgaria) Chavdar Atanasov (yellow card) (substituted off) 62'
Substitutes:
MF	10	(Bulgaria) Asen Nikolov (substituted on) 46'
DF	16	(Bulgaria) Veselin Vachev (substituted on) 89'
FW	20	(Federal Republic of Yugoslavia) Neško Milovanović (substituted on) 62' (yellow card)
Manager:
(Bulgaria) Dimitar Dimitrov

== See also ==
- 1999–2000 A Group
