= Krasimir Balakov =

Bulgarian footballer and manager

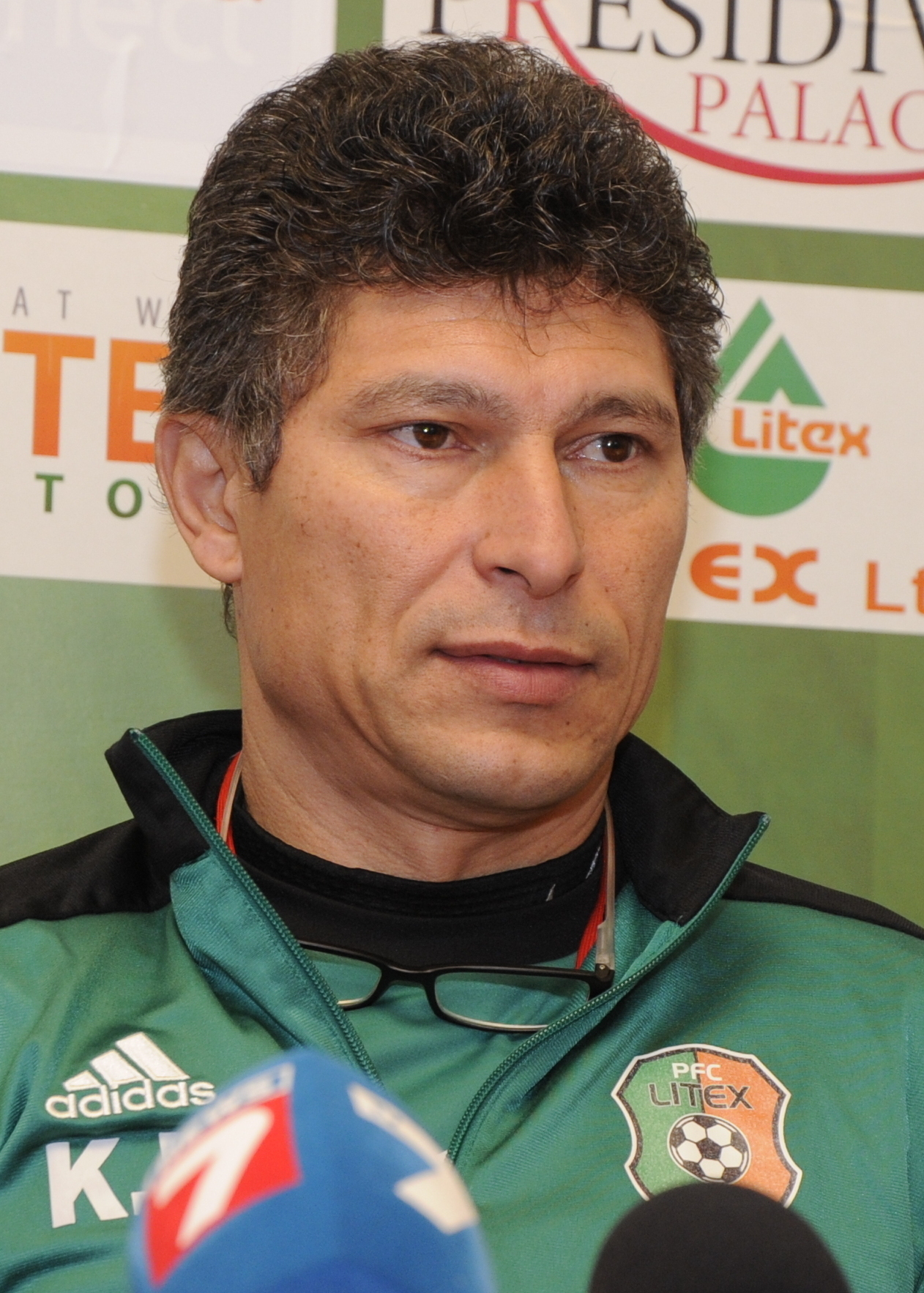
- Balakov in 2015

Personal information
- Full name: Krasimir Genchev Balakov
- Date of birth: 29 March 1966 (age 60)
- Place of birth: Veliko Tarnovo, Bulgaria
- Height: 1.76 m (5 ft 9 in)
- Position: Attacking midfielder

Senior career*
Years	Team	Apps	(Gls)
1983–1990	Etar Veliko Tarnovo	142	(35)
1991–1995	Sporting CP	138	(43)
1995–2003	VfB Stuttgart	236	(54)
2005	VFC Plauen	1	(0)
Total		517	(132)

International career
1984–1987	Bulgaria U21	29	(3)
1988–2003	Bulgaria	92	(16)

Managerial career
- 2003–2005: VfB Stuttgart (assistant)
- 2005: VFC Plauen (player-manager)
- 2006–2007: Grasshoppers
- 2007–2008: St. Gallen
- 2008–2010: Chernomorets Burgas
- 2011–2012: Hajduk Split
- 2012: 1. FC Kaiserslautern
- 2014–2015: Litex Lovech
- 2018–2019: Etar Veliko Tarnovo
- 2019: Bulgaria
- 2020–2021: CSKA 1948
- 2023–2024: Septemvri Sofia
- 2024: Lokomotiv Sofia
- * Club domestic league appearances and goals

Krasimir Genchev Balakov (Bulgarian: Красимир Генчев Балъков, pronounced [krɐsiˈmir bɐˈɫɤkof]; born 29 March 1966) is a former Bulgarian footballer and manager. A former attacking midfielder, he was a key member of the Bulgaria national team that finished fourth in the 1994 FIFA World Cup. He is considered as second only to Hristo Stoichkov among Bulgarian men's footballers of his generation.

== Club career ==
Balakov began his club career at the local Etar Veliko Tarnovo, before transferring to Sporting Clube de Portugal in 1990, playing alongside future Ballon d'Or recipient Luís Figo, his compatriot Yordanov, and future two-time Champions League winner Paulo Sousa. Though Sporting Clube de Portugal had a quality squad, Balakov only won the 1994–95 Portuguese Cup during his time at the club. In 1995, he transferred to Germany's VfB Stuttgart where he won two UEFA Intertoto Cups (2000 and 2002) and a DFB-Pokal (1997), before retiring in 2003 - the same year that he called time on an international career which had spanned 15 years and 92 caps. As an attacking midfielder Balakov formed a successful attacking partnership with strikers Fredi Bobic and Giovane Élber at Stuttgart. The trio were known as the "magic triangle". He stayed at Stuttgart until retiring as a player in 2003, although he did make a comeback as a player two years later when he made a single appearance as player-manager of VFC Plauen.

== Coaching career ==
The year after he retired, Krasimir became assistant coach of the club he had just retired from, VfB Stuttgart. He stayed in this position for two years before deciding to become a player-manager at VFC Plauen, where he remained for just a short time.

He had been appointed on 16 January 2006 as a manager of Grasshopper Club Zürich to replace Hanspeter Latour who left for 1. FC Köln. Balakov won the Intertoto Cup, thus qualified the club to the UEFA Cup for 2006–07 season.

He had been appointed on 29 October 2007 as a manager of FC St. Gallen to replace Rolf Fringer. Three days before the season ended, he was fired by the club management.

In December 2008, he became manager of PFC Chernomorets Burgas in his homeland, taking over from Dimitar Dimitrov, after also having considered an offer to coach the national team of his country. On 6 December 2010, he was released from PFC Chernomorets Burgas after mutual consent, following a change in the long-term vision for the club by the owner Mitko Sabev.

On 27 May 2011, it was announced that Balakov would take over the helm of Croatian club Hajduk Split.

On 22 March 2012, Balakov was appointed the manager of 1. FC Kaiserslautern. He was sacked on 17 May 2012, after being unable to prevent Kaiserslautern's relegation to the 2. Bundesliga. He subsequently continued his career as manager in his country.

On 4 January 2018, he was announced as the new manager of Etar Veliko Tarnovo with Stanislav Genchev, Iliyan Kiryakov and Kaloyan Chakarov as first team coaches.

On 14 May 2019, he was named as the new manager of the Bulgaria national team.

In October 2019, Balakov was replaced as manager of the national team by Georgi Dermendzhiev after resigning from his role following the backlash over his denial of alleged fan racism aimed at members of the England team in a Euro 2020 qualifying match as well as a continued string of unsatisfactory results. He took over as manager of CSKA 1948 in June 2020. In late August 2020, Balakov's duties were extended to cover the organizational management as well, with assistant Yordan Yurukov becoming more actively involved in the training process. However, the latter resigned on 22 September, leaving Balakov to be the sole one in charge of the team. In June 2021, Balakov parted ways with CSKA 1948, with the club's management thanking him for establishing the team among the stronger sides in the top division of Bulgarian football. In May 2023, Balakov returned to coaching, being appointed as manager of relegation-threatened Septemvri Sofia. He was unable to save the team from the drop, but stayed on as manager in the B PFG. Balakov left Septemvri in October 2023 due to disagreements with the club ownership. At the time his team was top of the standings. In April 2024, Balakov took the helm at Lokomotiv Sofia, achieving the task of saving the team from relegation, but decided not to stay on as head coach for the next season.

== International career ==
Balakov made 92 appearances for Bulgaria, between 1988 and 2003 (one of the best totals in national history) and scored 16 goals. He made his debut on 2 November 1988, in the 1–1 draw with Denmark in a qualifying match for the 1990 FIFA World Cup, coming on as a late second half substitute for Hristo Stoichkov. At the 1994 FIFA World Cup, he finished in fourth place with Bulgaria after losing 2–1 to Italy in the semi-finals and 4–0 to Sweden in the bronze medal match, completing the most dribbles throughout the tournament (31). Other than that, he also played for his country at Euro 1996 and the 1998 FIFA World Cup. At age 37 he played in the qualifications for Euro 2004 to help his teammates qualify but retired from football before the final stage in Portugal.

=== International goals ===
Scores and results list Bulgaria's goal tally first, score column indicates score after each Balakov goal.

List of international goals scored by Krasimir Balakov
No.	Date	Venue	Opponent	Score	Result	Competition
1	14 May 1992	Olympiastadion, Helsinki, Finland	Finland	1–0	3–0	1994 World Cup qualifier
2	9 September 1992	Vasil Levski National Stadium, Sofia, Bulgaria	France	2–0	2–0	1994 World Cup qualifier
3	11 November 1992	Saint-Ouen, Paris, France	Portugal	1–1	1–2	Friendly match
4	19 January 1994	SDCCU Stadium, San Diego, United States	Mexico	1–1	1–1	Friendly match
5	16 November 1994	Vasil Levski National Stadium, Sofia, Bulgaria	Moldova	2–1	4–1	Euro 1996 qualifier
6	29 March 1995	Vasil Levski National Stadium, Sofia, Bulgaria	Wales	1–0	3–1	Euro 1996 qualifier
7	26 April 1995	Stadionul Republican, Chişinău, Moldova	Moldova	1–0	3–0	Euro 1996 qualifier
8	1 September 1996	Ramat Gan Stadium, Ramat Gan, Israel	Israel	1–0	1–2	1998 World Cup qualifier
9	8 October 1996	Stade Josy Barthel, Luxembourg City, Luxembourg	Luxembourg	1–0	2–1	1998 World Cup qualifier
10	14 December 1996	Tsirio Stadium, Limassol, Cyprus	Cyprus	2–1	3–1	1998 World Cup qualifier
11	8 June 1997	Neftochimik Stadium, Burgas, Bulgaria	Luxembourg	3–0	4–0	1998 World Cup qualifier
12	28 March 2001	Balgarska Armia Stadium, Sofia, Bulgaria	Northern Ireland	1–0	4–3	2002 World Cup qualifier
13	15 August 2001	Balgarska Armia Stadium, Sofia, Bulgaria	(North Macedonia) Macedonia	1–0	1–0	Friendly match
14	21 August 2002	Georgi Asparuhov Stadium, Sofia, Bulgaria	Germany	2–1	2–2	Friendly match
15	16 October 2002	Vasil Levski National Stadium, Sofia, Bulgaria	Andorra	2–0	2–1	Euro 2004 qualifier

== Managerial statistics ==
As of 18 October 2019

Team	From	To	Competition	Record							
Team	From	To	Competition	G	W	D	L	Win %	GF	GA	GD
Grasshopper Club Zürich	16 January 2006	21 May 2007	Swiss Super League	53	19	18	16	35.85	71	54	+17
Grasshopper Club Zürich	16 January 2006	21 May 2007	UEFA Cup	12	6	2	4	50.00	21	18	+3
Grasshopper Club Zürich	16 January 2006	21 May 2007	Total	65	25	20	20	38.46	92	72	+20
Chernomorets Burgas	14 December 2008	6 December 2010	Bulgarian A Professional Football Group	60	29	16	15	48.33	79	54	+25
Chernomorets Burgas	14 December 2008	6 December 2010	Bulgarian Cup	2	1	0	1	50.00	5	2	+3
Chernomorets Burgas	14 December 2008	6 December 2010	Total	62	30	16	16	48.39	84	56	+28
Hajduk Split	31 May 2011	22 March 2012	Prva HNL	22	13	5	4	59.09	42	17	+25
Hajduk Split	31 May 2011	22 March 2012	Croatian Cup	4	3	0	1	75.00	9	4	+5
Hajduk Split	31 May 2011	22 March 2012	UEFA Cup	2	0	0	2	0.00	0	2	–2
Hajduk Split	31 May 2011	22 March 2012	Total	28	16	5	7	57.14	51	23	+28
1. FC Kaiserslautern	22 March 2012	17 May 2012	Bundesliga	8	1	0	7	12.50	7	18	–11
1. FC Kaiserslautern	22 March 2012	17 May 2012	Total	8	1	0	7	12.50	7	18	–11
Litex Lovech	27 May 2014	11 July 2015	Bulgarian A Professional Football Group	31	16	6	9	51.61	49	32	+17
Litex Lovech	27 May 2014	11 July 2015	Bulgarian Cup	5	3	1	1	60.00	9	7	+2
Litex Lovech	27 May 2014	11 July 2015	Europa League	6	2	3	1	33.33	8	6	+2
Litex Lovech	27 May 2014	11 July 2015	Total	42	21	10	11	50.00	66	45	+21
Etar Veliko Tarnovo	4 January 2018	14 May 2019	First Professional Football League	52	24	10	18	46.15	65	56	+9
Etar Veliko Tarnovo	4 January 2018	14 May 2019	Bulgarian Cup	3	2	1	0	66.67	6	1	+5
Etar Veliko Tarnovo	4 January 2018	14 May 2019	Total	55	26	11	18	47.27	71	57	+14
Bulgaria national football team	14 May 2019	18 October 2019	UEFA Euro 2020 qualifying Group A	5	0	1	4	0.00	3	15	-12
Bulgaria national football team	14 May 2019	18 October 2019	Friendly	1	0	0	1	0.00	1	3	-2
Bulgaria national football team	14 May 2019	18 October 2019	Total	6	0	1	5	0.00	4	18	-14
Career totals			League	226	102	55	69	45.13	313	231	+82
Career totals			National League Cup	14	9	2	3	64.29	29	14	+15
Career totals			European League Cup	20	8	5	7	40.00	29	26	+3
Career totals			Nation	6	0	1	5	0.00	4	18	-14
Career totals			Total	266	119	63	84	44.74	375	289	+86

== Honours ==
Etar Veliko Tarnovo

- A Group: 1990–91

Sporting CP

- Portuguese Cup: 1995

VfB Stuttgart

- DFB-Pokal: 1996–97
- UEFA Intertoto Cup: 2000, 2002
- DFB-Ligapokal finalist: 1997, 1998
- UEFA Cup Winners' Cup finalist: 1997–98
- Bundesliga runner-up: 2002–03

Bulgaria

- FIFA World Cup fourth place: 1994

Individual

- FIFA World Cup All-Star Team: 1994
- Bulgarian Footballer of the Year: 1995, 1997
- kicker Bundesliga Team of the Season: 1995–96, 1996–97, 1997–98
- World XI (Reserve): 1996
