= Denis Jeršov =

Lithuanian engineer (1966 – 2017)

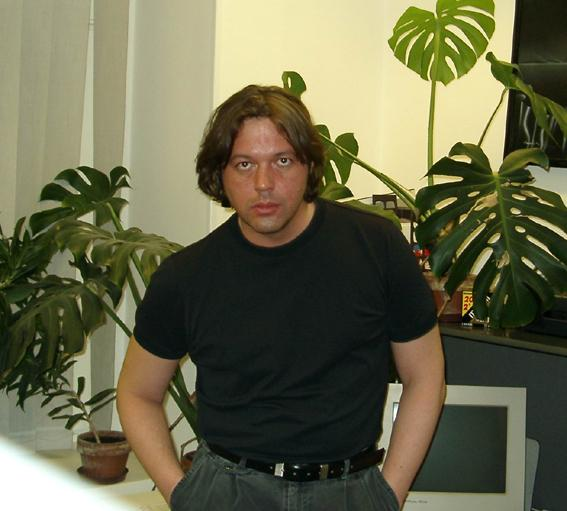
- Born: April 12, 1966; Chelyabinsk, Soviet Union
- Died: November 18, 2017 (aged 50)
- Citizenship: Lithuanian
- Education: Engineering, Tyumen State Oil and Gas University
- Occupations: businessman, entrepreneur

Denis Jeršov (April 12, 1966 – November 18, 2017) was a Lithuanian engineer and an oil & gas entrepreneur. He was the founder of two of the biggest oil and gas export companies in Russia. Later in his career, Jeršov became widely known for his heavy investments in the oil & gas industry of Bulgaria. In 2006, Denis Jeršov married Elena Rogojina - an internationally celebrated top model and a former Miss Russia and Miss Europe. The couple was known for their affinity for the arts, and their patronage of the National Theater in Bulgaria, among others.

== Early life and education ==
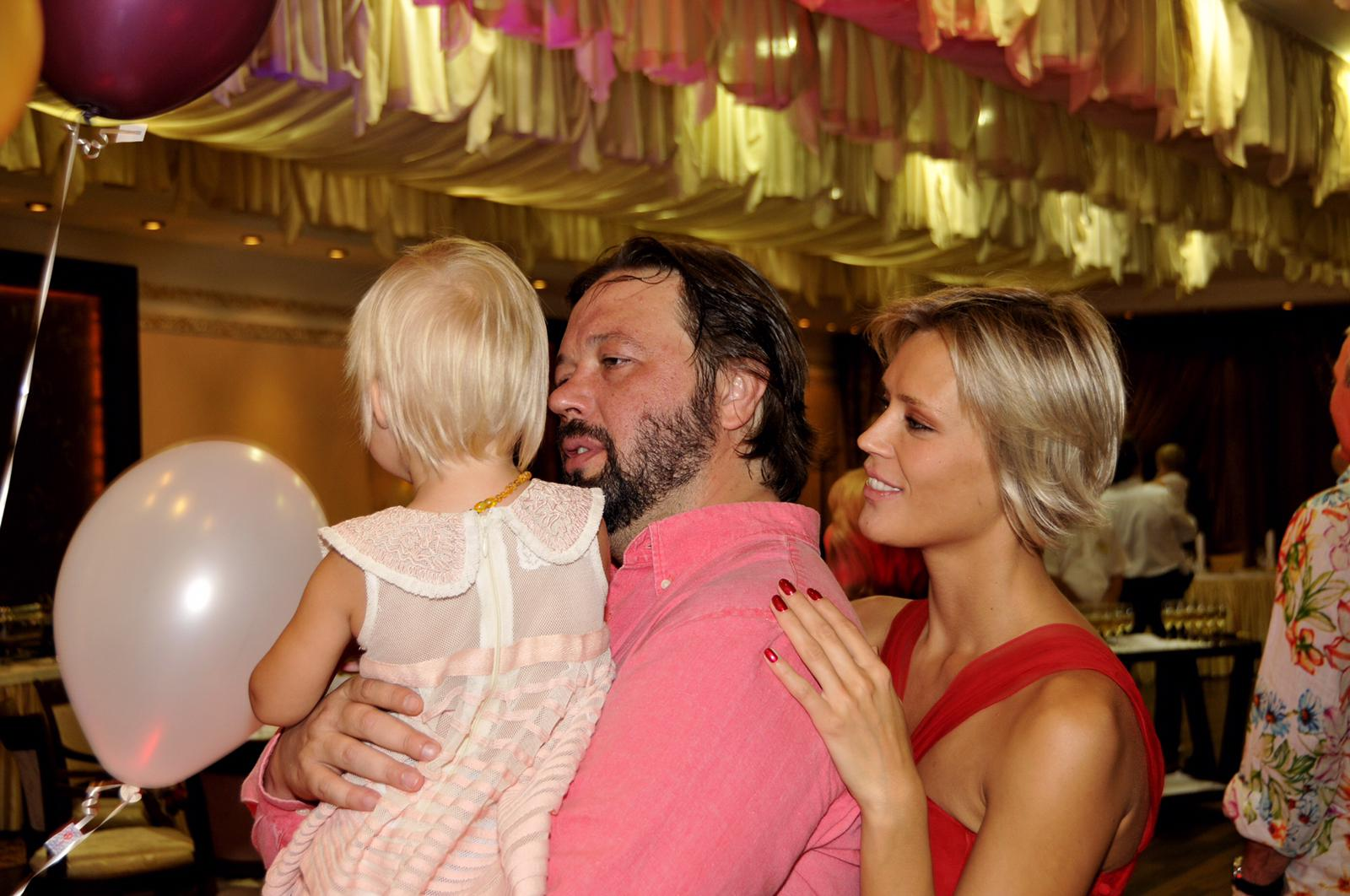
Denis and Elena Jeršova with their family

Denis Jeršov was born in 1966 to a Lithuanian family in Chelyabinsk, the Soviet Union. After graduating high school, he earned an oil & gas engineering degree in mining and extraction from the Tyumen State Oil and Gas University in the Soviet Union in 1988.

== Career ==
=== Conex ===
In 1990, Denis Jeršov became one of the founders of Conex, a company created by some of the biggest state-owned oil and gas companies in Russia. Among them were Rosneft (called Пурнефтгаз at the time), Gazprom Neft (called Сибнефть at the time) and Yukos Oil Company (called Юганскнефтегаз at the time).

Between 1990 and 1993, Denis Jeršov served as an Executive Vice-President of Conex in charge of exports of oil and gas products for the state-owned Russian oil companies. Between 1991 and 1996, Conex was among the top tree biggest exporters of crude oil from Russia and the countries from the former Soviet Union.

=== Naftex ===
Denis Jeršov left Conex in 1993 to create Naftex (НАФТЭКС) - a private group of several corporations specialized in the purchase and sale of oil products on the international market. The main company in the Naftex group was NAFTEX Oil Trading LTD with an annual trade balance of over 650 million barrels of crude oil between 1994 and 2004.

Between 2001 and 2004, the biggest Russian oil and gas companies began to establish their own foreign trade networks and decreased their reliance on Naftex. Around the same time, Naftex Oil Trading LTD became one of the main providers of crude oil to Bulgaria's biggest oil refinery-Neftochim, which later became part of the Lukoil group of companies and now does business as Lukoil Neftohim.

Foreseeing the independent foreign expansion of some of his biggest clients such as Yukos, Rosneft and Gazprom Neft (called Сибнефть at the time), Jeršov made considerable investments in Bulgaria's oil & gas industry becoming one of Bulgaria's largest foreign investors in the post-communist period.

=== Petrol ===
==== 1998–2001 ====
In 1998, his Bulgarian holding Yukos Petroleum Bulgaria (YPB) led a joint bid with the Austrian oil & gas company OMV Group to acquire Petrol – one of the biggest distributors of oil and gas products in Bulgaria owning more than 445 gas stations and 80 petrol storage facilities in the country.

Petrol was acquired by the Jeršov-led consortium for $50.5 million and a four-year $66 million investment program after a privatization competitive tender organized by the Bulgarian Government.

In the years that followed, YPB was renamed to Naftex Bulgaria Holding AD, and acquired the shares in Petrol held by the other investors in the consortium, as well as the majority of the public shares trading on the Bulgarian Stock Exchange at the time. Denis Jeršov and Naftex Bulgaria Holding AD held over 95% of the registered capital in Petrol.

At the end of 2001, the National Security Agency of Bulgaria (NSA) issued a 10-year ban on Denis Jeršov and several Russian businessmen on entering the country.

==== 2001–2004 ====
Jeršov's legal challenges against the ban continued for 4 years, during which he was forced to reside outside Bulgaria. During that time Naftex Bulgaria Holding AD (controlling 95% of Petrol) was managed by the minority shareholder and CEO Mitko Sabev.

==== 2004–2013 ====
After the ban was lifted in 2004, Jeršov returned to Bulgaria and began restructuring and modernizing Petrol. Naftex Bulgaria Holding AD (NBH) was renamed to Petrol Holding AD and served as a holding company for Petrol and all other business interests of Jeršov in Bulgaria. As part of said restructuring, Jeršov agreed to increase the stake of his Bulgarian business partner and CEO at the time, Mitko Sabev, to 47.5% of Petrol Holding AD, with Jeršov retaining control of the holding with 47.5% owned by him and 5% owned by Alexander Melnik – a former classmate and a friend of Jeršov.

Following this arrangement, Mitko Sabev continued to exercise day-to-day control over Petrol Holding AD's activities for the next few years. During that time tensions between Jeršov and Sabev started to escalate. In 2010, Jeršov alleged that his partner and managing director of Petrol Holding – Mitko Sabev had lost more than $100 million through stock market speculations.

In the years between 2010 and 2014 a highly-contested legal battle for control over the Holding ensued. The conflict between Jeršov and Sabev, Petrol Holding's two largest shareholders, was widely publicized in the Bulgarian media at the time.

Towards the end of 2013, Jeršov eventually managed to retake control over Petrol Holding. However, at that time, the holding was already in a dire financial position, experiencing serious liquidity problems and under the burden of considerable amounts of debt having lost its main business "Petrol" to the Corporate Commercial Bank under suspicious circumstances.

==== 2014–2016 ====
Jeršov spent the following two years in more legal battles while trying to restructure and rescue Petrol Holding without "Petrol" in it. His efforts were ultimately unsuccessful and Petrol Holding declared bankruptcy in 2016.

== Personal life ==
Denis Jeršov was known to have enjoyed acting in his early life. During his time in Tyumen State Oil and Gas University, he founded the first university theater group with his future friend and business partner Alexander Melnik.

Denis Jeršov was married 3 and had two children with 2 of his wives. His 3 wife was Elena Jeršova who was the 1997 titleholder of the Miss Russia beauty pageant and the 1999 Miss Europe. Elena and Denis met at a charity gala in London in 2005 and married a year later. During their life in Bulgaria the couple became known for its patronage of the arts and in particular the National Theater of Bulgaria, where Elena funded several performances of Russian classics. Elena later was admitted and pursued a degree in Arts History at the Bulgarian Academy of Arts.

== Death ==
In 2017, Jeršov's health rapidly deteriorated. Denis Jeršov died at a Sofia hospital on 18 November 2017, aged 50, from leukemia. His funeral was held in Sofia.
