= Chernomorets Arena =

Planned sports venue in Burgas, Bulgaria

- Interactive map of Chernomorets Arena
- Full name: Chernomorets Sports Complex
- Location: Burgas, Bulgaria
- Coordinates: 42°29′25″N 27°27′11″E
- Owner: Petrol Holding AD
- Operator: Chernomorets Burgas
- Capacity: 30,000
- Surface: Grass
- Field size: 105 × 68

Construction
- Groundbreaking: postponed
- Cost: € 500 million
- Architect: Petko Yovchev †

Tenant
- PFC Chernomorets Burgas

Chernomorets Arena (Bulgarian: Черноморец Арена) is a planned sports venue in Burgas, Bulgaria. The stadium is planned to replace the Chernomorets Stadium with a capacity of 30,000 spectators and a possible expansion to 55,000. It is planned to be the home ground of the local PFC Chernomorets Burgas and may be one of the most expensive stadiums in Europe.

The stadium will be part of a modern complex with a mall, underground parking area, indoor sports hall with a capacity of 3,500 spectators, three business towers and a five-star luxury hotel. The whole complex will cost 1 billion euros, according by the owner of Chernomorets and Petrol Holding AD Mitko Sabev.

The venue will be able to host matches of European football tournaments such as the UEFA Champions League and the UEFA Europa League, due to the lack of licensed stadiums in most parts of Eastern Bulgaria.

The stadium can also support a possible bid as a venue for the UEFA Euro 2020, which Bulgaria and Romania are planning to host.
