= 1999–2000 A Group =

52nd completed season of top-tier football league in Bulgaria

A Group
- Season: 1999–2000
- Dates: 6 August 1999 – 9 June 2000
- Champions: Levski Sofia (21st title)
- Relegated: Dobrudzha; Belasitsa; Pirin; Shumen
- Champions League: Levski
- UEFA Cup: CSKA
- Matches: 240
- Goals: 663 (2.76 per match)
- Top goalscorer: Mihail Mihaylov (20 goals)

The 1999–2000 A Group was the 52nd season of the A Football Group, the top Bulgarian professional league for association football clubs, since its establishment in 1948.

== Overview ==
It was contested by 16 teams, and Levski Sofia won the championship.

== Team information ==
=== Stadia and locations ===
The following teams have ensured their participation in A Group for season 1999–00 (listed in alphabetical order):

Location of teams in 1999–2000 A Group
Sofia 1999–2000 A Group football clubs

Team	City	Stadium	Capacity
Belasitsa	Petrich	Tsar Samuil	9,500
Botev	Plovdiv	Hristo Botev	18,000
Chernomorets	Burgas	Chernomorets	22,000
CSKA	Sofia	Bulgarian Army	22,995
Dobrudzha	Dobrich	Druzhba	12,500
Levski	Sofia	Georgi Asparuhov	29,986
Lokomotiv	Sofia	Lokomotiv	22,000
Lovech	Lovech	Lovech	7,050
Minyor	Pernik	Minyor	18,000
Neftochimic	Burgas	Lazur	18,037
Olimpik-Beroe	Stara Zagora	Beroe	16,000
Pirin	Blagoevgrad	Hristo Botev	15,000
Shumen	Shumen	Panayot Volov	24,000
Slavia	Sofia	Ovcha Kupel	18,000
Spartak	Varna	Spartak	8,000
Velbazhd	Kyustendil	Osogovo	10,000

== League standings ==
Pos	Team	Pld	W	D	L	GF	GA	GD	Pts	Qualification or relegation
1	Levski Sofia (C)	30	23	5	2	66	17	+49	74	Qualification for Champions League first qualifying round
2	CSKA Sofia	30	20	4	6	60	26	+34	64	Qualification for UEFA Cup qualifying round
3	Velbazhd Kyustendil	30	17	4	9	52	32	+20	55	Qualification for Intertoto Cup first round
4	Neftochimic Burgas	30	14	11	5	42	21	+21	53	Qualification for UEFA Cup qualifying round (Note: Neftochimic Burgas qualified for UEFA Cup as a finalists in the 1999–2000 Bulgarian Cup.)
5	Lovech	30	15	4	11	61	34	+27	49	
6	Slavia Sofia	30	13	6	11	38	40	−2	45	
7	Spartak Varna	30	12	5	13	42	51	−9	41	
8	Botev Plovdiv	30	12	4	14	43	42	+1	40	
9	Lokomotiv Sofia	30	10	9	11	54	37	+17	39	
10	Chernomorets Burgas	30	10	7	13	31	40	−9	37	
11	Minyor Pernik	30	11	3	16	44	58	−14	36	
12	Dobrudzha Dobrich (R)	30	10	5	15	30	43	−13	35	Qualification for relegation play-off
13	Olimpik-Beroe (O)	30	10	4	16	28	47	−19	34	Qualification for relegation play-off
14	Belasitsa Petrich (R)	30	9	6	15	28	57	−29	33 (Note: Belasitsa Petrich ahead of Pirin Blagoevgrad on head-to-head record; Belasitsa Petrich–Pirin Blagoevgrad 4–1, Pirin Blagoevgrad–Belasitsa Petrich 1–0.)	Relegation to 2000–01 B Group
15	Pirin Blagoevgrad (R)	30	10	3	17	31	50	−19	33	Relegation to 2000–01 B Group
16	Shumen (R)	30	3	2	25	13	68	−55	11	Relegation to 2000–01 B Group

Source: A PFG (in Bulgarian) and rsssf.com
Rules for classification: 1st points; 2nd head-to-head points; 3rd head-to-head goal difference; 4th head-to-head goals scored; 5th head-to-head away goals scored; 6th season goal difference; 7th season goals scored; 8th "sportsmanship" (R & Y cards); 9th draw
(C) Champions; (O) Play-off winners; (R) Relegated

== Results ==
Home \ Away	BEL	BOT	CHB	CSK	DOB	LEV	LSO	LOV	MIN	NEF	BSZ	PIR	SHU	SLA	SPV	VEL
Belasitsa Petrich		3–1	1–0	2–0	1–0	0–0	2–2	1–0	2–2	1–1	1–1	4–1	1–0	2–0	1–1	1–2
Botev Plovdiv	2–0		0–1	1–2	0–0	1–2	1–0	2–0	1–0	1–2	2–0	2–1	4–0	6–0	6–2	1–0
Chernomorets Burgas	3–0	0–0		0–2	0–0	2–3	1–1	1–1	2–1	0–0	2–1	2–0	1–0	1–0	3–2	1–1
CSKA Sofia	3–0	4–0	3–0		4–1	1–0	3–2	2–0	6–1	1–4	3–0	1–1	4–0	3–1	1–0	3–1
Dobrudzha Dobrich	3–1	1–0	0–0	0–3		0–1	2–1	1–3	3–1	0–0	2–1	4–2	3–0	2–0	2–0	0–1
Levski Sofia	6–0	4–1	2–0	1–0	2–1		3–0	1–1	4–1	2–0	2–0	1–0	3–0	4–1	5–0	3–0
Lokomotiv Sofia	2–0	1–1	4–1	0–0	4–0	1–1		2–1	2–3	1–1	4–1	5–1	2–0	6–0	5–0	1–1
Lovech	8–0	2–0	2–0	3–2	4–1	1–1	3–2		6–3	0–1	2–0	1–1	6–0	0–1	4–1	3–1
Minyor Pernik	4–0	1–1	2–1	1–2	4–0	3–2	0–1	4–3		1–0	2–0	2–0	2–0	0–3	1–1	0–2
Neftochimic Burgas	3–0	0–1	2–0	2–1	3–1	1–1	3–2	2–1	4–1		3–0	1–1	1–0	0–0	4–0	1–0
Olimpik-Beroe	1–0	5–2	1–0	1–1	1–0	0–1	2–0	0–2	1–0	0–0		4–0	1–0	1–1	2–0	0–4 (Note: Match awarded as Olimpik-Beroe did not play after the 0–1 in the second half.)
Pirin Blagoevgrad	1–0	3–1	2–3	0–1	2–1	0–1	1–0	0–1	2–0	1–0	2–1		3–1	1–4	2–0	1–0
Shumen	0–1	1–2	2–3	0–1	0–1	1–4	1–1	1–0	1–3	1–1	2–1	1–0		0–3 (Note: Match awarded as Slavia did not play the match.)	0–3	1–2
Slavia Sofia	5–1	3–2	1–0	0–0	2–1	0–2	1–0	1–0	4–1	1–1	1–2	3–1	1–0		0–0	1–2
Spartak Varna	3–1	2–1	4–2	1–2	2–0	0–1	2–1	1–0	1–0	1–1	4–0	2–1	4–0	0–0		5–3
Velbazhd Kyustendil	2–1	2–0	2–1	3–1	0–0	1–3	1–1	1–3	3–0	1–0	4–0	3–0	6–0	1–0	2–0	

Source: A PFG (in Bulgarian)
Legend: Blue = home team win; Yellow = draw; Red = away team win.

== Relegation play-off ==
14 June 2000
18:30 EEST

Dobrudzha Dobrich	0–2	Hebar Pazardzhik

14 June 2000
18:30 EEST

Olimpik-Beroe	1–0	Spartak Pleven

== Champions ==
Levski Sofia

Goalkeepers
1	(Bulgaria) Dimitar Ivankov	27	(5)
12	(Bulgaria) Georgi Sheytanov	3	(0)

Defenders
2	(Bulgaria) Martin Stankov	14	(0)
3	(Bulgaria) Stanimir Stoilov	25	(3)
5	(Uzbekistan) Aleksey Dionisiev	12	(2)
6	(Scotland) John Inglis	17	(0)
11	(Bulgaria) Elin Topuzakov	23	(3)
13	(Bulgaria) Yulian Petkov	7	(0)
16	(Bulgaria) Veselin Vachev	6	(0)
21	(Bulgaria) Zahari Sirakov	29	(1)
23	(Bosnia and Herzegovina) Dalibor Dragić	9	(0)
24	(Bulgaria) Predrag Pažin	23	(1)

Midfielders
4	(Bulgaria) Biser Ivanov	26	(4)
7	(Bulgaria) Aleksandar Aleksandrov	28	(6)
10	(Bulgaria) Asen Nikolov	12	(1)
14	(Bulgaria) Krasimir Dimitrov	21	(0)
15	(Bulgaria) Chavdar Atanasov	21	(4)
20	(Federal Republic of Yugoslavia) Neško Milovanović	12	(1)
22	(Bulgaria) Dimitar Telkiyski	17	(4)
25	(Bulgaria) Stanislav Genchev	1	(0)
26	(Bulgaria) Viktorio Pavlov	6	(0)

Forwards
8	(Ivory Coast) Serge Yoffou	25	(13)
9	(Bulgaria) Georgi Ivanov	23	(12)
17	(Uzbekistan) Georgi Georgiev	14	(3)
18	(Bulgaria) Georgi Bachev	7	(3)
19	(Bulgaria) Todor Kolev	3	(0)

Manager
(Bulgaria) Dimitar Dimitrov

== Top scorers ==
Rank	Scorer	Club	Goals
1	(Bulgaria) Mihail Mihaylov	Velbazhd Kyustendil	20
2	(Bulgaria) Svetoslav Todorov	Litex Lovech	19
3	(Bulgaria) Plamen Timnev	Spartak Varna	16
4	(Bulgaria) Dimitar Ivanov	CSKA Sofia	14
4	(Bulgaria) Dimitar Berbatov	CSKA Sofia	14
4	(Bulgaria) Anton Evtimov	Minyor Pernik	14
7	(Ivory Coast) Serge Yoffou	Levski Sofia	13
8	(Bulgaria) Georgi Ivanov	Levski Sofia	12
9	(Bulgaria) Anastas Petrov	Botev Plovdiv	10
9	(Bulgaria) Stefan Yurukov	Spartak Varna; Litex Lovech	10

- Source:1999–2000 Top Goalscorers

== Attendances ==
No.	Club	Average
1	Beroe	13,600
2	Levski	12,667
3	Neftochimik	12,600
4	Chernomorets	10,000
5	Botev Plovdiv	8,400
6	Belasitsa	7,500
7	CSKA Sofia	7,367
8	Pirin	6,500
9	Dobrudzha	5,967
10	Velbazhd	5,067
11	Lokomotiv Sofia	5,067
12	Spartak Varna	3,280
13	Shumen	3,157
14	Lovech	2,987
15	Minyor	2,880
16	Slavia Sofia	2,700
