= Sabev =

Sabev (Bulgarian: Събев, shortened from the male given name Sabotin (Bulgarian: Съботин) which may be derived from събота meaning "Saturday") is a Bulgarian masculine surname – its feminine counterpart being Sabeva (Bulgarian: Събева) – and may refer to:

- Mitko Sabev (born 1961), Bulgarian businessman
