= Gancho Evtimov =

Bulgarian former footballer

Personal information
- Full name: Gancho Evtimov Evtimov
- Date of birth: 2 December 1969 (age 56)
- Place of birth: Panagyurishte, Bulgaria
- Position: Defender

Team information
- Current team: Neftochimic Burgas (Manager)

Youth career
- FC Oborishte Panagyurishte

Senior career*
| Years | Team | Apps | (Gls) |
| 1992–1994 | Hebar Pazardzhik | 55 | (1) |
| 1994–1998 | Neftochimic Burgas | 115 | (8) |
| 1998–2003 | Lokomotiv Sofia | 120 | (16) |
| 2003–2005 | Vidima Rakovski | 50 | (9) |
| 2005–2006 | Chernomorets Burgas | 30 | (5) |
| 2006–2008 | Naftex Burgas | 25 | (1) |

Managerial career
- 2016: Neftochimic Burgas
- * Club domestic league appearances and goals

Gancho Evtimov (Bulgarian: Ганчо Евтимов) (born 2 December 1969) is a Bulgarian former footballer who played as a defender.

His career is mostly associated with Neftochimic, where he is considered a club legend. He has also served as manager of the team.
