= Kochan =

Kochan Кочан
- Village
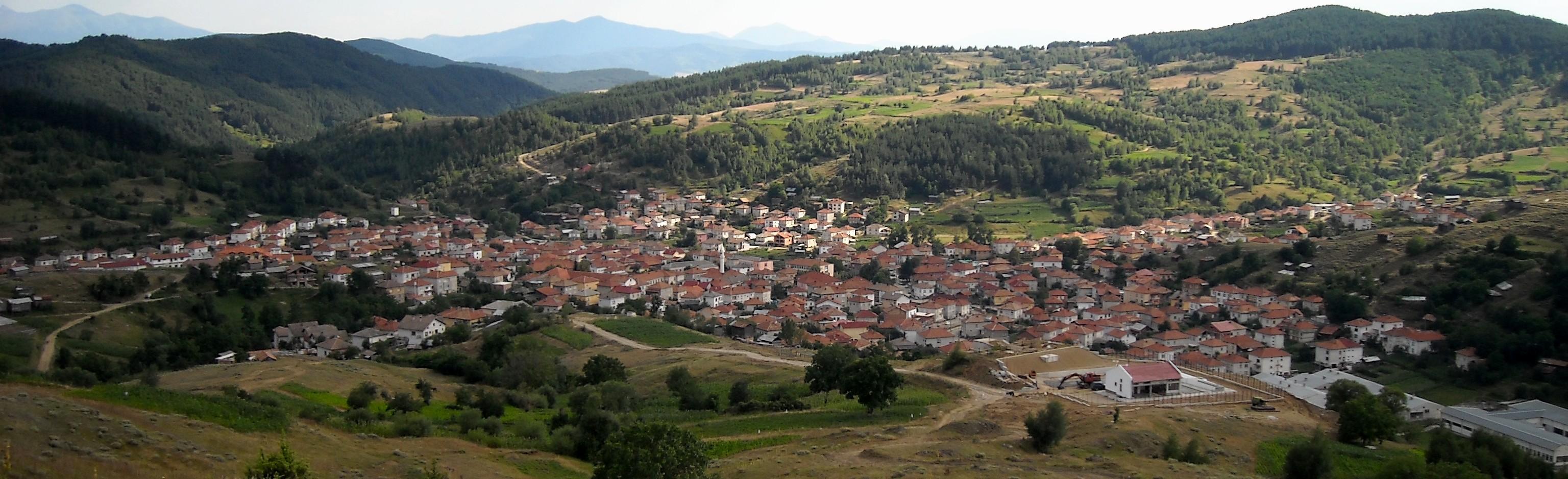

- Location of Kochan
- Coordinates: 41°35′13.38″N 24°1′40.44″E
- Country: Bulgaria
- Province (Oblast): Blagoevgrad
- Municipality (Obshtina): Satovcha

Government
  - Mayor: Yuri Mollov (CEDB)

Area
  - Total: 32.783 km^{2} (12.658 sq mi)
- Elevation: 961 m (3,153 ft)

Population (2024-03-15)
  - Total: 2,740
- Time zone: UTC+2 (EET)
  - Summer (DST): UTC+3 (EEST)
- Postal Code: 2955
- Area code: 07545
- Vehicle registration: E

Kochan (Bulgarian: Кочан) is a village in Southwestern Bulgaria. It is located in Satovcha Municipality, Blagoevgrad Province.

== Geography ==
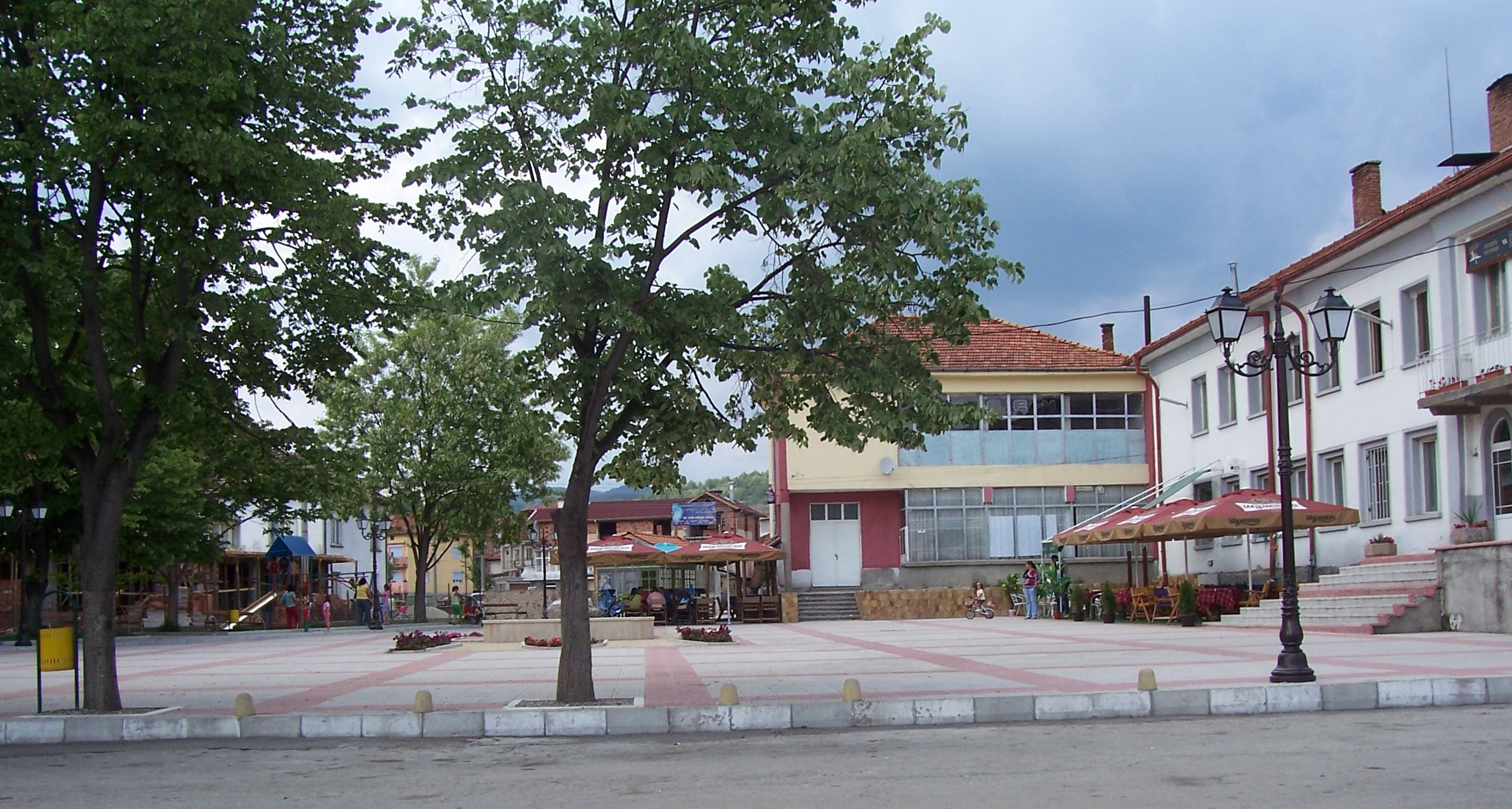
The center of the village of Kochan

The village of Kochan is situated in a mountainous region of southwestern Bulgaria, approximately 10 km from the border with Greece in the Chech region. It is surrounded by high peaks, the tallest of which is Marashova Chuka, rising to an elevation of 1,414 meters. A small river flows through the village, originating from a karst spring located several kilometers to the north.

The vicinity of Kochan features coniferous, deciduous, and mixed forests. Birch forests dominate the lower elevations, and the largest birch massif in the Balkans is found nearby. Scots pine and spruce are characteristic of the most northern parts of the village territory.

In the second half of the 20th century, a significant portion of the birch forest was cleared, and the cleared land was replanted with pine trees. A century-old birch forest once extended to the northeastern outskirts of the village but was destroyed by a large wildfire one-and-a-half to two centuries ago. Today, the remnants of that forest can be found in the northeastern surroundings of Kochan.

== History ==
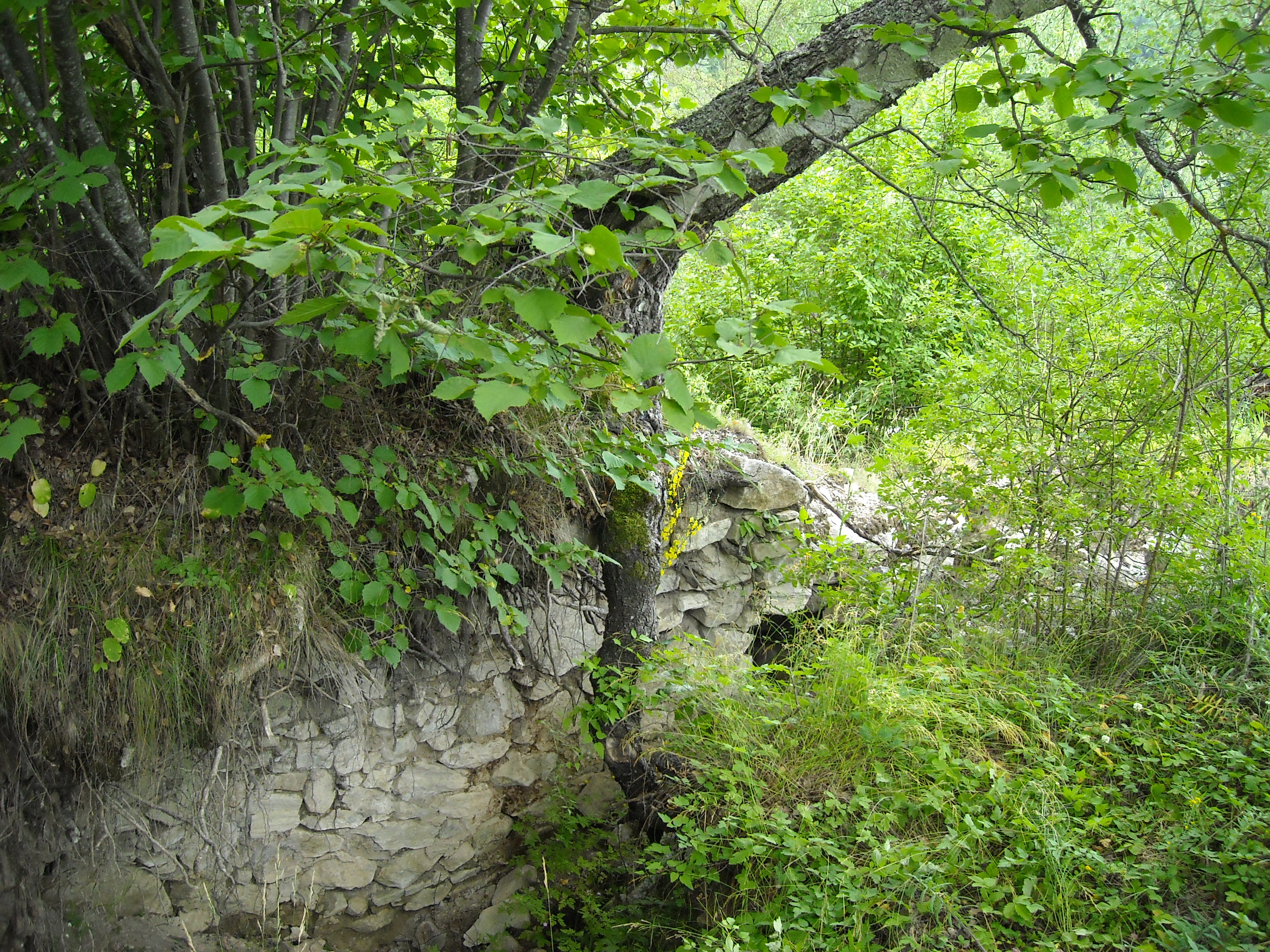
Ruins of a Medieval building near Kochan.

The village of Kochan has a rich history. Remains of surrounding settlements date back to 3000 BC. In historical times, the area was inhabited by the Thracian tribes of Diobesi and Chaleti, and possibly by the Sapaei.

The modern village was established between 7th and 8th centuries AD when the local Thracian villages united in the valley of the Kochanska River. Two Roman graves on the outskirts of the village attest to the Roman presence in the area, and just three kilometers north of the village are to be found the remains of a Roman settlement. However, archaeological surveys indicate that the local inhabitants were not fully Romanized; their Thracian culture and language persisted well into the 6th and 7th centuries.

Thracian settlements in the vicinity of Kochan were located in areas known as Kravek, Dalboki Dol, Kvachevo, Lukovitsa, Chindzhovo, Iztok, Baleva Niva, Shiroka Polyana, Livadeto, Visoka Maglitsa, Zaimova Chuka, Padiboga, Selishte, Kirmikya, Kalyovishte, Redovna Niva and Rata. The settlement at Zaimova chuka existed from the 3rd millennium BC until the 10th or 11th century AD. In 2001, an iron sword was excavated from a tomb near Kochan. The weapon, a type known as Rhomphaia, is dated to the second half of the 4th century to the middle of the 3rd century BC. The total length of the sword is 128 cm, with a handle measuring 52 cm and a blade length of 76 cm.

Kochan became part of the First Bulgarian Empire during the reign of Presian (836–852). However, it later fell back under Byzantine rule. By the 12th or 13th century, Kochan was incorporated into the realm of Despot Alexius Slav. Ultimately, in the 14th century, it came under the control of the Ottoman Empire.

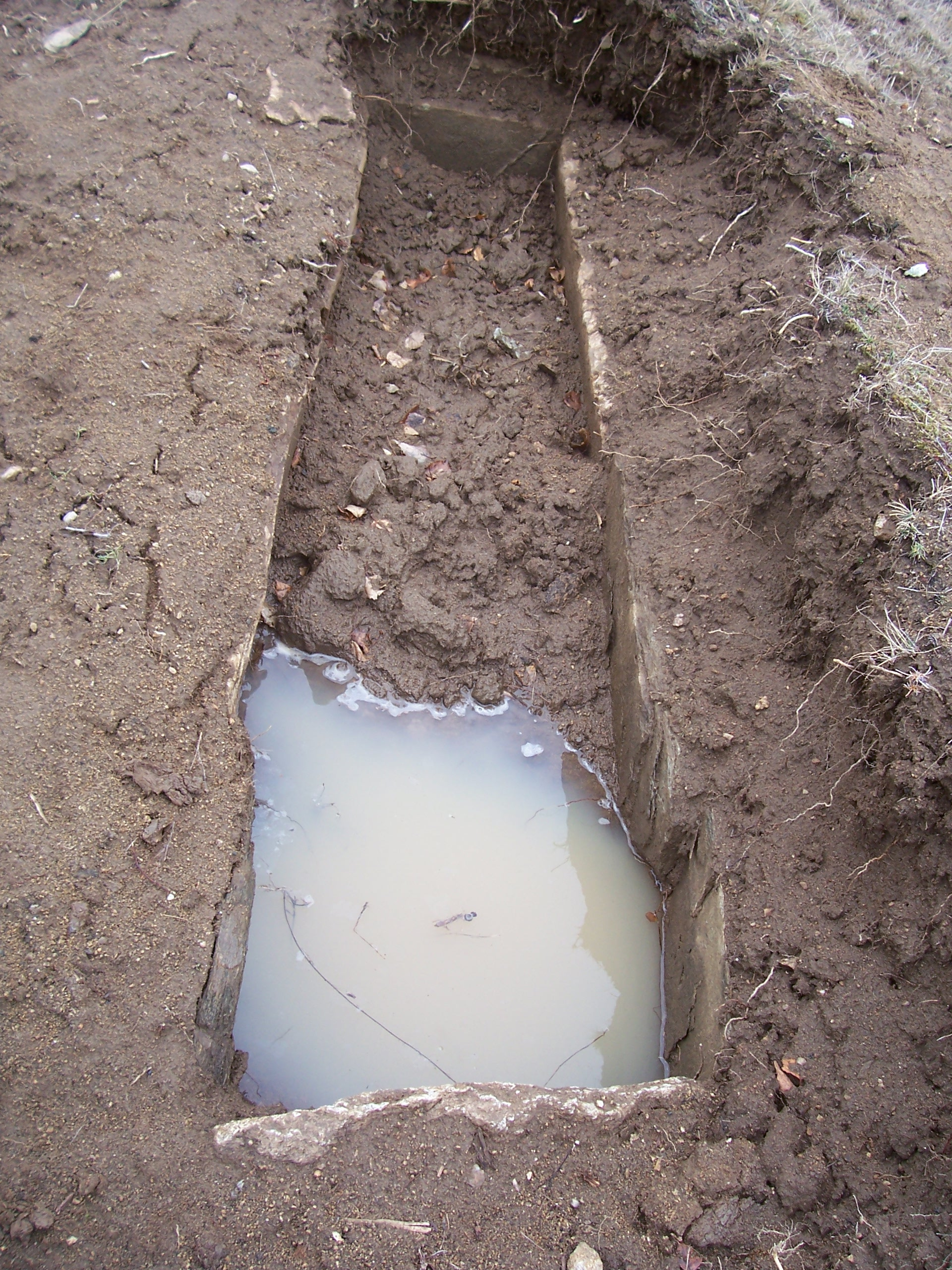
An ancient grave excavated by treasure hunters near Kochan.

As of 1873 Kochan (Kotchen) had male population of 280 Pomaks and 100 houses. According to Stephan Verkovic at the end of the 19th century, the village had a male population of 312 Pomaks and 100 houses. In his statistic Vasil Kanchov mentions that in 1900 Kochan (Кочен) is a Pomak village with 773 inhabitants (Bulgarian Muslims) in total.

In 1912 during the First Balkan War, Kochan was acceded to Bulgaria and shortly after its population was forced to convert from Islam to Christianity. But soon Bulgaria was drawn into the Second Balkan War and the local inhabitants formed guerrilla corps together with the inhabitants of the villages of Vaklinovo, Lyubcha, Valkosel and Dospat. Detachments of 30, 50 and 60 insurgents were formed to counter the Bulgarian haidouks and eventually the Bulgarian military. On the eve of 27 September 1913 they attacked a Bulgarian frontier post adjacent to the village of Chavdar. Finally the appointed priest in the village was expelled and Islam restored. Due to the fear of revenge or second baptism in 1914 15 families emigrated to the village of Kocapınar, Balıkesir Province, Turkey. After the Treaty of Lausanne in 1923 all Muslims from Drama Prefecture were expelled from Greece. Some Pomaks found temporary shelter in Kochan where they prepared for emigration to Turkey. After two years, in 1925, they left dragging along some inhabitants of Kochan with them and settled in the villages of Edirne Province, but after all some of the refugees remained in Kochan.

Due to the isolation of the Pomaks and the poverty the emigration continued in the following years. In a message from the minister of war to the Ministry of Internal Affairs is reported that on 11 May 1934, 16 inhabitants of Kochan and Zhizhevo illegally crossed the border with Greece and emigrated after they had been told by a Greek merchant that Greece and Turkey provide land and financial support for Pomak refugees.

During 1964 the Communist regime made an attempt to change the Muslim names of the Pomaks in Kochan with Slavic ones but the attempt failed and only those loyal to the regime had their names changed. On 23 April 1972 in the town of Sarnitsa an appointed Bulgarian policeman was killed by five native Pomaks because of a confiscated driving license. One of the ravishers surrendered immediately while the rest made an attempt to escape to Greece but were arrested in Kochan where they had received temporary shelter. That was a good moment for the regime to make a second attempt for a forced name change since the inhabitants of the village were shocked by the incident and the authorities charged them with complicity in the murder. Thus the name change went relatively smooth.

== Religion ==
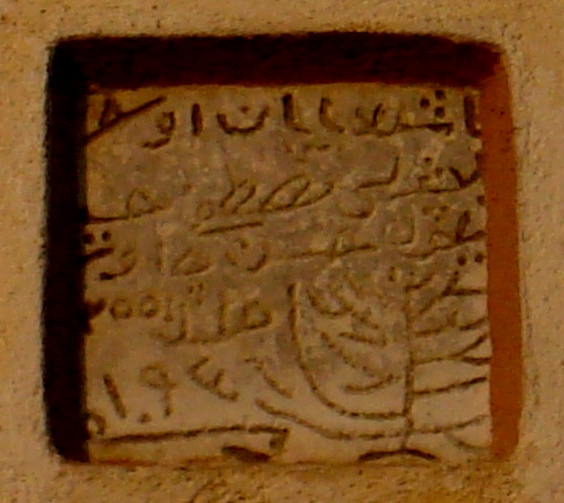
Medieval inscription on the mosque in Kochan.

The population of the village is almost exclusively Muslim. There is a small minority of Romani people most of which converted to Evangelism in the beginning of the 21st century. In historic times the population confessed the Thracian Polytheistic religion. In the Middle Ages it supposedly converted to Orthodox Christianity though some researches maintain that the population may have confessed Paulicianism or Bogomilism. In the 15th century, after the Ottoman Empire established its rule in the region, a steady process of conversion to Islam begun. An Ottoman registry about the falcon breeders and trainers from 1482 enlists 21 Muslim falcon breeders from Kochan. Further documents from 1444, 1464, 1478, 1519, 1530 and 1569 show a steady increase of the Muslim population of Kochan and the neighboring villages. The first mosque was constructed in 1545.

In 1912 the Bulgarian army acceded Kochan to the present Bulgarian state. Unlike the inhabitants of most neighboring villages, the inhabitants of Kochan chose to convert to Christianity when they were posed an ultimatum by the Bulgarian army and they avoided the genocide which took place in many villages in Rhodope. The mayor and the imam of the village gathered the people and explained to them that according to the Koran it is permissible to convert to other religion when threaten by death, on the condition to remain a true Muslim in the heart. When the army arrived, it destroyed the mosque and built a church. Eventually the church was dismissed and the mosque and Islam restored by the end of 1913 with the beginning of the Second Balkan War and the establishment of the Provisional Government of Western Thrace.

During the socialist regime in Bulgaria, in Kochan, as everywhere in state, the confession of any religion was limited and the access to the mosque banned. Eventually in 1989 the minaret of the mosque was ruined in such a manner that it damaged the whole building. Immediately after the rise of democracy in the late 1989, an effort to repair the mosque began. It was finished to its present state in 1991.

== Public institutions ==
The following public institutions are established in the village of Kochan: local government office, hospital, primary and secondary schools, two kindergartens, post office, mosque and chitalishte.

== Culture and nature ==
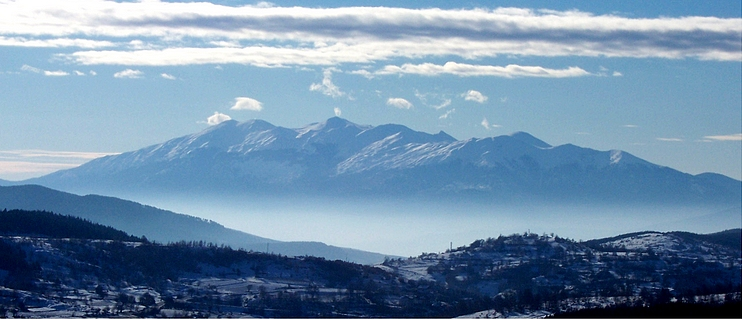
A nice view from north of Kochan (Chinjovo summit) towards Greece.

The different relief forms of the mountain combined with the different types of forests, the fields and the meadows make interesting scenes and landscapes. One can see regions in Greece from the highlands and notably mount Falakro. Other scenes are the mountains Slavyanka, Pirin and Rhodope. The remains of several Thracian settlements lie around the villages. Notably in the regions Ushite, Kravek, Livadeto and Redovna niva. There are also two ancient larger settlements - one in Iztok and the second in Visoka Magiltsa. Another notable sight is the remains of a monastery near Izora. Other larger ancient settlements are discovered in the territory of the neighboring villages and specifically the ones in Visoka magiltsa and Orfeevoto.

It is less than 10 km from Kochan to the Konski dol natural reserve, 19 km to the Tymnata gora natural reserve and 25 km to Dospat Dam.

== Literature ==
- Искренов, Андон (1995). Кочан (in Bulgarian). София: Културно-просветен център „Васил Априлов“. ISBN 954-8528-03-7. Archived from the original on 2010-06-18.
- Мельов, Антон (17 May 1973). "Извори и предания за миналото на с.Кочан". Пиринско Дело (in Bulgarian) (114).
- Поликар, Сами (1–7 June 1995). "70 години училище в село Кочан". Свободен Народ (in Bulgarian) (22).
- Докузов, Иван (22 January 1972). "Срещи и разговори в обновения Кочан". Пиринско Дело (in Bulgarian) (16).
- Колев, Симеон (18 December 1973). "Новите измерения на Кочанска община". Пиринско Дело (in Bulgarian) (295).
- Христов, Р. (1970). "Koчан: очерк за селото". Родопи (in Bulgarian) (11): 4–7.

== Regular events ==
- The weekly market is held every Thursday in the center of the village.
- In 2004 the tradition of holding a fair was reintroduced. It takes place every year on the Vaklinovski livadi meadows.
- In 1995 the tradition of holding a school festival was reintroduced. Students from different ages present theatrical scenes, sing songs or dance traditional or modern dances.

== Notable people ==
- Alben Kumbarov - wrestler. European champion (Ankara '89), world championship bronze medal winner (Budapest '85), winner of the Dan Kolov Belt (1987);
- Atanas Zehirov - football player of CSKA Sofia, Bulgaria national under-21 football team and of the Bulgaria national under-19 football team;
- Hyusein Imamov-Manov - member of the 26th Ordinary and of the 6th Grand National Assembly of Bulgaria;
- Kamen Hadzhiev - a professional football player from neighboring Zhizhevo who was born in Kochan. He has played for Rodopa Smolyan, Wattenscheid 09, Schalke 04, Pirin Gotse Delchev and Minyor Pernik.
- Lyubomir Kumbarov - four-time gold medal winner in various wrestling tournaments in Bulgaria, coach at the Marathon Wrestling Club in London; and wrestling coach as Roger Gracie JIU JITSU London.
- Malin Orachev - football player of Pirin Blagoevgrad, Naftex Burgas, Lokomotiv Sofia and of the Bulgaria national football team;
- Shakir Poyukov - member of the 7th Grand National Assembly of Bulgaria;
- Veselin Davidov - member of the 41st National Assembly of Bulgaria.
