= Stanimir Dimov-Valkov =

Bulgarian footballer

Stanimir Valkov
Personal information
- Full name: Stanimir Dimov Valkov
- Date of birth: 3 July 1978 (age 48)
- Place of birth: Burgas, Bulgaria
- Height: 1.82 m (5 ft 11 1/2 in)
- Position: Defender

Team information
- Current team: Tundzha Yambol

Senior career*
Years	Team	Apps	(Gls)
1997–2003	PFC Naftex Burgas	?	(?)
2003–2005	Pomorie	?	(?)
2005	Metallurg-Kuzbass	11	(0)
2006–2007	Chernomorec 919	?	(?)
2007–2009	FK Jūrmala	?	(?)
2009–2011	Neftochimic Burgas 1986		
2011–	Tundzha Yambol		
- * Club domestic league appearances and goals

Stanimir Dimov Valkov (Bulgarian: Станимир Димов-Вълков; born 3 July 1978) is a Bulgarian defender, who currently plays for Tundzha Yambol.

Valkov previously played for FC Metallurg-Kuzbass Novokuznetsk in the Russian First Division.

== Playing career ==
1997–2003	PFC Naftex Burgas	TBI A Football Group 1st level	*
2003–2005	PFC Pomorie
2005	FC Metallurg-Kuzbass Novokuznetsk	First League 2nd level	11/0
2006–2007	FC Chernomorets 919 Burgas	TBI B Football Group 2nd level
2007	FK Jūrmala	LMT Virslīga 1st level

* – played games and goals
