= 2000–01 B Group =

Season of the Bulgarian B Football Group

Bulgarian B Group
- Season: 2000–01
- Champions: Spartak Pleven
- Promoted: Spartak Pleven, Marek
- Relegated: Septemvri, Metalurg, Haskovo, Bdin, Dorostol, Shumen
- Matches: 306
- Goals: 752 (2.46 per match)
- Top goalscorer: (Bulgaria) Todor Kolev (45 goals)

The 2000–01 B Group was the 45th season of the Bulgarian B Football Group, the second tier of the Bulgarian football league system. A total of 18 teams contested the league, but three of them stopped participating during the season due to financial reasons.

== Team changes ==
Locations of the 2000–01 Bulgarian B Group teams

The following teams had changed division after the 1999–2000 season.

=== To B Group ===
Promoted from V Group
- Marek Dupnitsa
- Slanchev Bryag Nesebar
- Dorostol Silistra
- Akademik Svishtov
Relegated from A Group
- Dobrudzha Dobrich
- Belasitsa Petrich
- Pirin Blagoevgrad
- Shumen

=== From B Group ===
Promoted to A Group
- Cherno More Varna
- Hebar Pazardzhik
Relegated to V Group
- Etar Veliko Tarnovo
- Antibiotik-Ludogorets Razgrad
- Maritsa Plovdiv
- Beroe 2000

== League table ==
Pos	Team	Pld	W	D	L	GF	GA	GD	Pts	Promotion or relegation
1	Spartak Pleven (P)	32	26	3	3	92	25	+67	81	Promotion to 2001–02 A Group
2	Marek Dupnitsa (P)	32	20	8	4	54	17	+37	68	Promotion to 2001–02 A Group
3	Pirin Blagoevgrad	32	18	7	7	48	21	+27	61	Qualification for Promotion play-off
4	Lokomotiv Plovdiv	32	18	4	10	55	39	+16	58	
5	Dobrudzha Dobrich	32	17	6	9	52	37	+15	57	
6	Slanchev Bryag Nesebar	32	16	6	10	51	36	+15	54	
7	Svetkavitsa Targovishte	32	17	3	12	47	36	+11	54	
8	Vidima-Rakovski	32	15	7	10	53	36	+17	52	
9	Botev Vratsa	32	15	1	16	56	57	−1	46	
10	Belasitsa Petrich	32	12	8	12	37	31	+6	44	
11	Dunav Ruse	32	12	5	15	35	38	−3	41	
12	Akademik Svishtov	32	10	8	14	37	37	0	38	
13	Septemvri Sofia (R)	32	9	10	13	39	47	−8	37	Relegation to 2001–02 V Group
14	Metalurg Pernik (R)	32	11	3	18	36	51	−15	36	Relegation to 2001–02 V Group
15	Haskovo (R)	32	10	3	19	32	60	−28	33	Relegation to 2001–02 V Group
16	Bdin Vidin (Note: Bdin Vidin were excluded after first half of the season and demoted to their regional third level league (Northwestern V Group) for failing to arrange their debts. To the end of the season they lost their matches 3–0 w/o.) (D)	31	3	1	27	18	96	−78	10	Excluded from the league
17	Dorostol Silistra (Note: Dorostol Silistra were excluded after first half of the season and demoted to their regional third level league (Northeastern V Group) for failing to arrange their debts. To the end of the season they lost their matches 3–0 w/o.) (D)	31	0	1	30	10	88	−78	1	Excluded from the league
x	Shumen (Note: Shumen were excluded after 13 matches and demoted to their regional third level league (Northeastern V Group) for failing to arrange their debts, their results were annulled.) (D)	13	2	0	11	9	30	−21	6	Excluded from the league

Source: 2000–01 B Group futbolbg.dir.bg
Rules for classification: 1) points; 2) goal difference; 3) number of goals scored.
(D) Disqualified; (P) Promoted; (R) Relegated

== Promotion play-off ==
30 May 2001

Beroe Stara Zagora	1–0	Pirin Blagoevgrad
Zhelev 73'

Georgi Asparuhov, Sofia
Attendance: 2,000

== Top scorers ==
Rank	Scorer	Club	Goals
1	(Bulgaria) Todor Kolev	Spartak Pleven	45
2	(Bulgaria) Rumen Rumenov	Bdin / Svetkavitsa	15
2	(Bulgaria) Ivan Georgiev	Slanchev Bryag	15
4	(Bulgaria) Ivaylo Andonov	Pirin Blagoevgrad	14
4	(Bulgaria) Rumen Shankulov	Vidima-Rakovski	14
6	(Bulgaria) Vladimir Kolev	Lokomotiv Plovdiv	13
7	(Bulgaria) Georgi Varadev	Metalurg / Loko Plovdiv	12
7	(Bulgaria) Martin Podvarzachov	Spartak Pleven	12
9	(Bulgaria) Emil Todorov	Spartak Pleven	11
10	(Bulgaria) Ivan Redovski	Botev Vratsa	10
10	(Bulgaria) Genadi Simeonov	Marek Dupnitsa	10
