= Stadion Lazur =

Sports stadium

efbet Arena Burgas
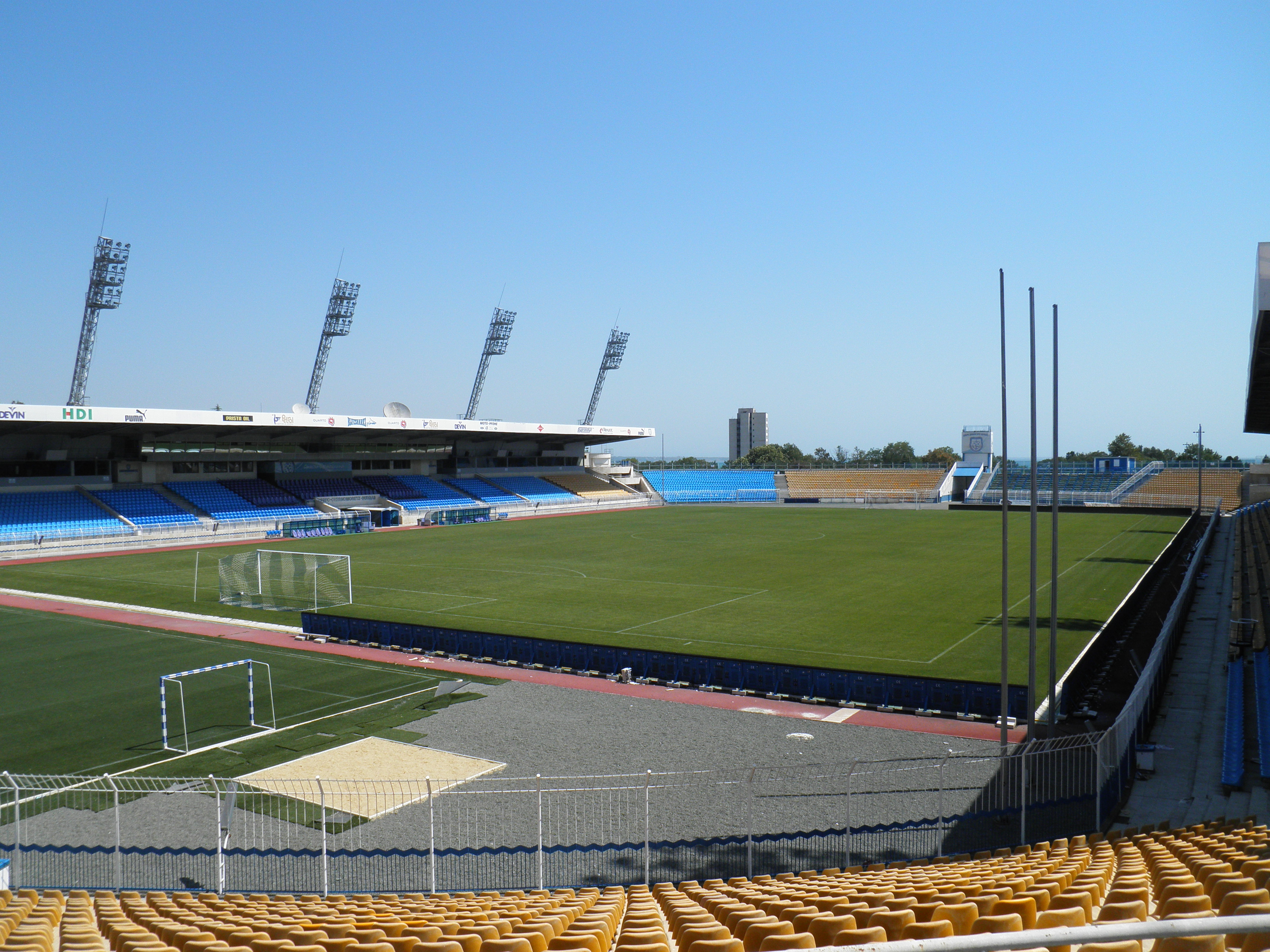
- UEFA Category 3 stadium
- Interactive map of efbet Arena Burgas
- Former names: Lazur Stadium; Neftochimic Stadium; Naftex Stadium
- Location: Burgas, Bulgaria
- Coordinates: 42°30′45″N 27°28′13″E
- Owner: Petrol Holding AD
- Operator: Neftochimic 1962 Burgas
- Capacity: 18,037
- Surface: Grass
- Field size: 105 x 68

Construction
- Opened: 6 September 1967
- Renovated: 1997; 2009; 2010

Tenants
- Naftex Burgas (1967–2009); Chernomorets Burgas (2006–2015); Neftochimic 1986 (2012–2013); Neftochimic Burgas (2015–2017, 2019–2021, 2025–); Pomorie (2017–2019); Chernomorets 1919 Burgas (2023–2024)

efbet Arena (Bulgarian: „Ефбет Арена“) is a multi-purpose stadium in Burgas, Bulgaria. It is currently used for football matches and is the home ground of Neftochimic 1962 Burgas. The stadium holds 18,037 people and carries a 3-star rating by UEFA. It was opened in 1967 and was renovated between 1990 and 1997. Officially opened after renovation at 13 April 1997 with the match Neftochimik - Levski Sofia 4:1. Until 2002 the stadium was named "Neftochimic" and later "Naftex".

The stadium was used by PFC Chernomorets Burgas between 2006 and 2015, even though they had plans to move to a new stadium in the future. It was used also in some European matches of Litex Lovech (for the UEFA Champions League match against FC Spartak Moscow), PFC Lokomotiv Plovdiv (for UEFA Champions League match against Club Brugge and for UEFA Cup matches against OFK Beograd and Bolton Wanderers F.C.) and PFC Cherno More Varna (for UEFA Intertoto match against UC Sampdoria and for the UEFA Europa League matches against Iskra-Stal and PSV Eindhoven).

- During several renovations of the Vasil Levski National Stadium the Bulgaria national football team has played some of their home matches at "Lazur".
- In the summer of 2009, the stadium underwent some serious upgrades, which included replacing the yellow-green seats with blue ones, as well as increasing the roof covers of the stadium to 10 meters.
- During the summer of 2015, the stadium was one of 4 venues hosting the 2015 UEFA European Under-17 Championship. It hosted 11 games in total, including the final, which had an official attendance of 14,680.

== National team matches ==
Date	Competition	Opponent	Score	Att.	Ref
Bulgaria (1997–present)
8 June 1997	1998 FIFA World Cup qualifying	Luxembourg	4–0	19,000	
6 September 1998	UEFA Euro 2000 qualifying	Poland	0-3	15,000	
14 October 1998	UEFA Euro 2000 qualifying	Sweden	0-1	12,000	
22 August 2007	Friendly	Wales	0-1	15,000	

== Bulgarian Cup & Supercup finals ==
Season	Winner	Score	Runner-up	Date	Att.
Bulgarian Cup (2012–present)
2011–12	Ludogorets Razgrad	2–1	Lokomotiv Plovdiv	19 May 2012	13,103
2013–14	Ludogorets Razgrad	1–0	Botev Plovdiv	15 May 2014	13,250
2014–15	Cherno More Varna	2–1 (aet)	Levski Sofia	30 May 2015	13,910
Bulgarian Supercup (2004–present)
2004	Lokomotiv Plovdiv	1-0	Litex Lovech	31 July 2004	4,500
2011	CSKA Sofia	3-1	Litex Lovech	30 July 2011	12,620
2012	Ludogorets Razgrad	3-1	Lokomotiv Plovdiv	11 July 2012	2,730
2014	Ludogorets Razgrad	3-1	Botev Plovdiv	13 August 2014	4,400
2015	Cherno More Varna	1-0	Ludogorets Razgrad	12 August 2015	1,810
2017	Botev Plovdiv	6-5 (pen)	Ludogorets Razgrad	9 August 2017	1,830

== See also ==
- Chernomorets Stadium
