= Serge Yoffou =

Ivorian footballer (born 1971)

Personal information
- Full name: Serge Alain Yoffou
- Date of birth: 24 December 1971 (age 54)
- Place of birth: Abidjan, Ivory Coast
- Height: 1.77 m (5 ft 10 in)
- Position: Forward

Youth career
- 1980–1986: Stade d'Abidjan
- 1986–1987: Stella d'Adjamé

Senior career*
Years	Team	Apps	(Gls)
1987–1993	Dijon FCO		
1993–1995	Paris FC		
1995–1997	FC Baden		
1997–1999	Dobrudzha Dobrich	43	(15)
1999–2000	Levski Sofia	25	(13)
2001–2002	SR Delémont	11	(2)
2002–2003	FC Thun	1	(0)
2003–2005	CS Chênois	17	(22)
2005–2007	Stade d'Abidjan		

International career
2000	Ivory Coast	4	(3)
- * Club domestic league appearances and goals

Serge Yoffou (born 24 December 1971) is an Ivorian former professional footballer who played as a forward. He played in his country for Stella d'Adjamé and Stade d'Abidjan, in France for Dijon FCO and Paris FC, in Bulgaria for Dobrudzha Dobrich and Levski Sofia and in Switzerland for FC Baden, SR Delémont, FC Thun and CS Chênois. At International level, he made four appearances for the Ivory Coast national team scoring four goals.

== Honours ==
Levski Sofia

- A PFG: 1999–2000
- Bulgarian Cup: 1999–2000
