= Chavdar Atanasov =

Bulgarian footballer

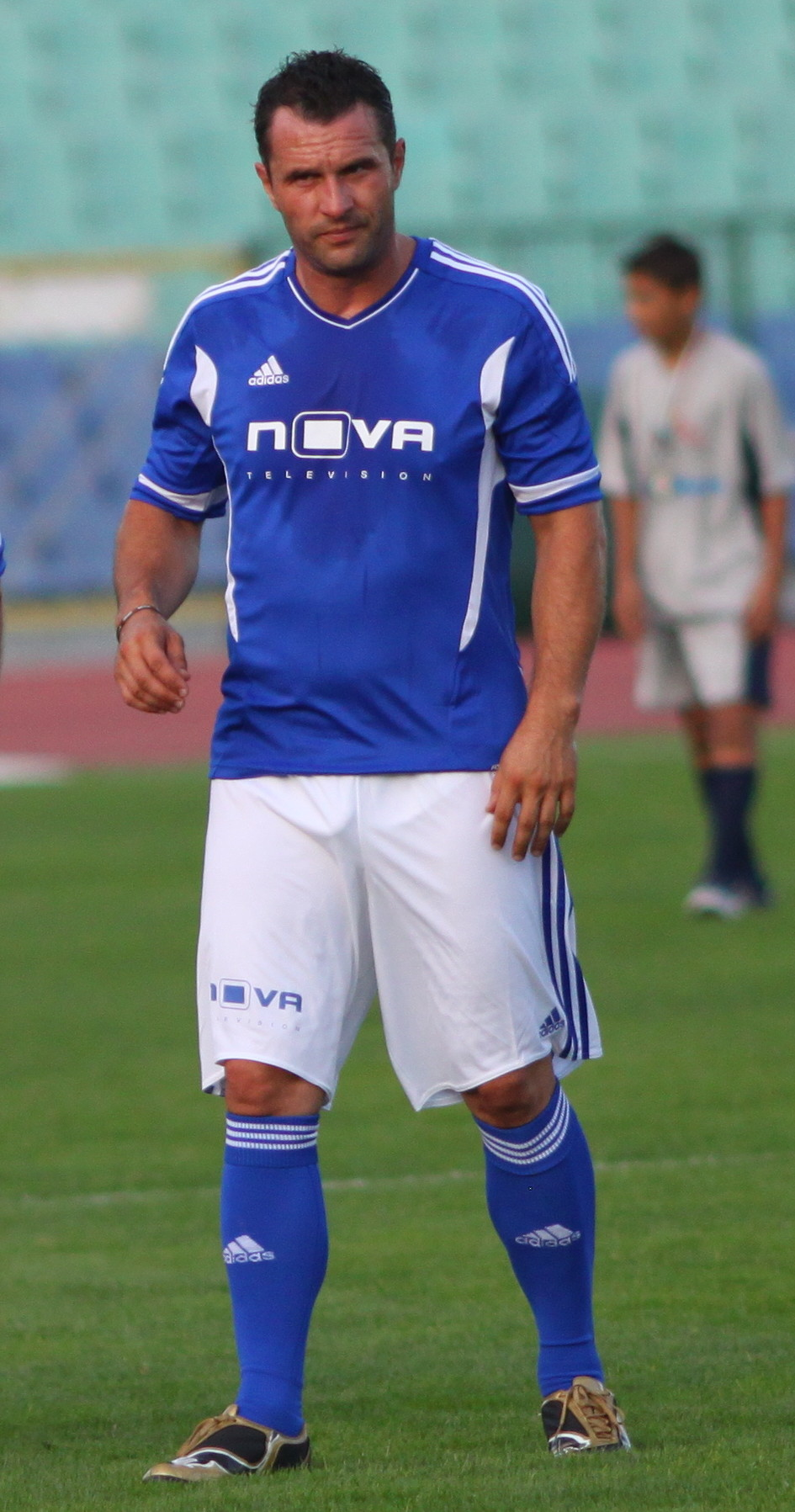

Personal information
- Full name: Chavdar Atanasov
- Date of birth: 3 February 1973 (age 53)
- Place of birth: Vratsa, Bulgaria
- Height: 1.80 m (5 ft 11 in)
- Position: Attacking midfielder

Senior career*
Years	Team	Apps	(Gls)
1990–1991	Botev Vratsa	13	(0)
1991–1994	Akademik Svishtov	31	(6)
1994–1995	CSKA Sofia	4	(0)
1995	→ Beroe (loan)	14	(0)
1995–1996	LEX Lovech	21	(2)
1996–1999	Septemvri Sofia	77	(19)
1999–2001	Levski Sofia	36	(6)
2001–2003	Lokomotiv Plovdiv	39	(2)
2003	Belasitsa Petrich	10	(1)
2004–2006	Vihar Gorublyane	47	(23)
Total		304	(71)
- * Club domestic league appearances and goals

Chavdar Atanasov (Bulgarian: Чавдар Атанасов) (born 3 February 1973, in Vratsa) is a Bulgarian retired football attacking midfielder. On 4 November 1999, he netted a goal for Levski Sofia in the 1:1 away draw with Juventus in the second leg of second round UEFA Cup match, with the "bluemen" being eliminated after a 2:4 aggregate score.

== Honours ==
Levski Sofia

- Bulgarian League: 1999–00, 2000–01
- Bulgarian Cup: 2000
