= Daniel Hristov =

Bulgarian footballer

Personal information
- Date of birth: 23 January 1975 (age 51)
- Place of birth: Kazanlak, Bulgaria
- Height: 1.73 m (5 ft 8 in)
- Position: Defender

Senior career*
Years	Team	Apps	(Gls)
1993–1994	Rozova Dolina	16	(1)
1994–1997	Velbazhd Kyustendil	79	(1)
1997	Chernomorets Burgas	7	(0)
1998–2005	Neftochimic Burgas	135	(1)
2005–2006	Vidima-Rakovski	14	(0)
2006–2008	Rodopa Smolyan	34	(0)
Total		285	(3)

Managerial career
- 2014–: Greater Lowell United FC Assistant Coach
- * Club domestic league appearances and goals

Daniel Hristov (Bulgarian: Даниел Христов) (born 23 January 1975 in Kazanlak) is a Bulgarian retired football defender. He is currently the assistant coach at Greater Lowell United FC in Lowell, MA under Head Coach Jason Moore.

== Club Playing Honours ==
Neftochimic Burgas

- Bulgarian Cup: runner-up 2000
