= Kamen Hadzhiev =

Bulgarian footballer

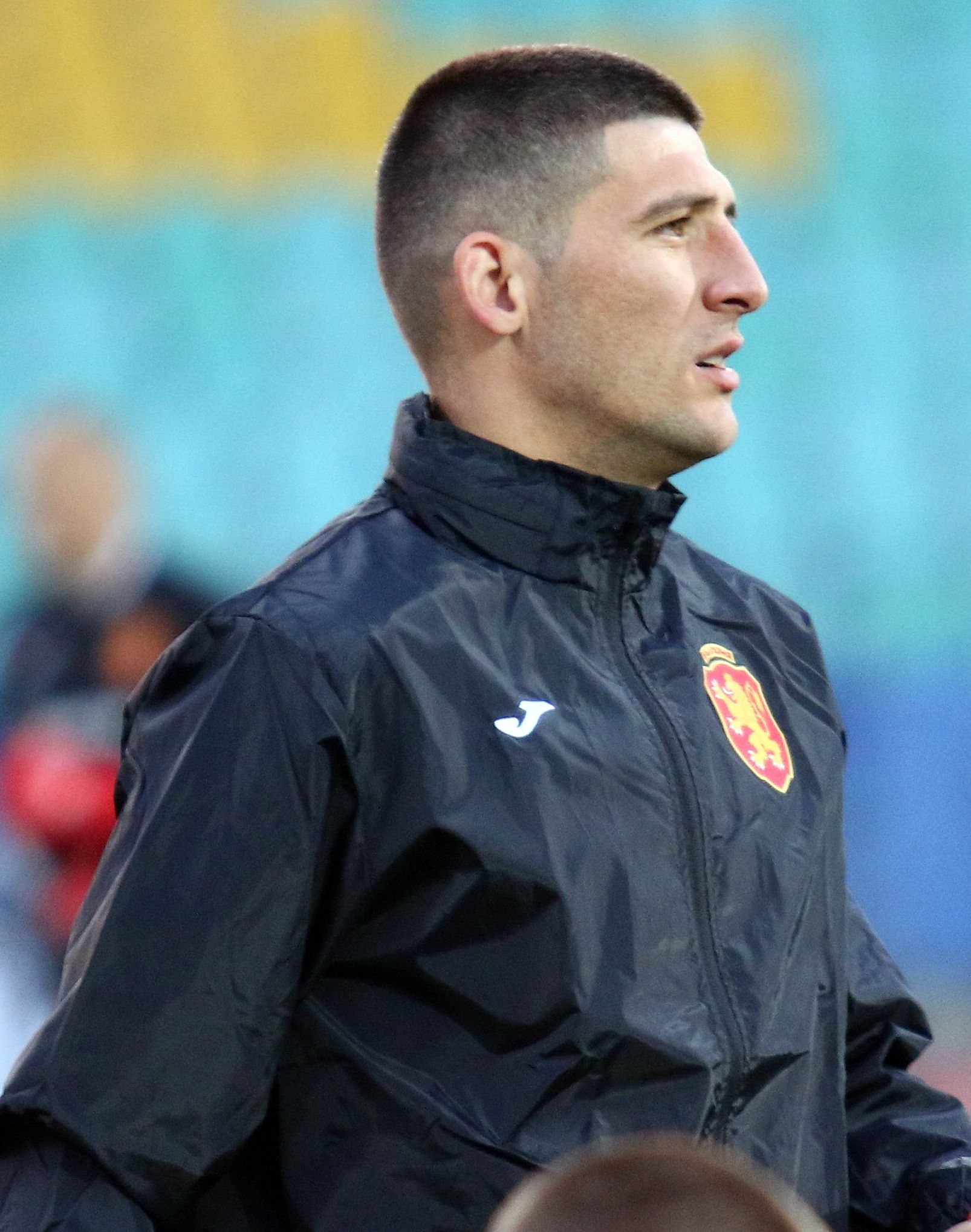

Personal information
- Full name: Kamen Galabov Hadzhiev
- Date of birth: 22 September 1991 (age 35)
- Place of birth: Kochan, Bulgaria
- Height: 1.87 m (6 ft 1 1/2 in)
- Position: Centre back

Team information
- Current team: Vihren Sandanski
- Number: 26

Youth career
- 2000–2008: Rodopa Smolyan
- 2008–2009: Wattenscheid 09
- 2009–2010: Schalke 04

Senior career*
Years	Team	Apps	(Gls)
2007–2008	Rodopa Smolyan	1	(0)
2010–2011	Pirin GD	30	(1)
2011–2013	Minyor Pernik	12	(0)
2014–2015	Lokomotiv Sofia	41	(1)
2015–2016	VfB Oldenburg	34	(6)
2016–2017	Fortuna Sittard	32	(2)
2017–2018	Beroe	46	(1)
2019–2021	Puskás Akadémia	49	(0)
2021	Beroe	14	(0)
2022	Pakhtakor Tashkent	10	(0)
2022	Lokomotiv Sofia	11	(0)
2023	Hebar Pazardzhik	5	(0)
2023–2024	SSV Jeddeloh	15	(1)
2024	Chernomorets Burgas	12	(1)
2024–2026	Dunav Ruse	68	(9)
2026–	Vihren Sandanski	0	(0)

International career^{‡}
2007	Bulgaria U17	3	(0)
2019	Bulgaria	1	(0)
- * Club domestic league appearances and goals as of 24 May 2026 ‡ National team caps and goals as of 14 October 2019

Kamen Galabov Hadzhiev (Bulgarian: Камен Гълъбов Хаджиев; born 22 September 1991) is a Bulgarian professional footballer who currently plays as a defender or defensive midfielder for Vihren Sandanski.

== Career ==
Born in Kochan, Hadzhiev began his football career playing for club Rodopa. He was included in the 18-man squad to face CSKA Sofia in an A Group match on 19 May 2007. Hadzhiev, subsequently, made his professional debut in the match, at the age of 15 years and 8 months, coming on as a substitute in the 88th minute.

In 2008 Hadzhiev joined the Wattenscheid 09 Academy in Germany. In the 2008–09 season, he made 18 appearances for the U-19 squad, scoring 5 goals. In 2009, he joined Schalke 04's youth academy.

In July 2010, Hadzhiev signed with Pirin Gotse Delchev. He made his league debut against Botev Krivodol on 31 July, playing the full 90 minutes. Hadzhiev has been a regular starter during the season in the second division, playing 30 matches. On 18 September 2010, he netted Pirin's only goal in their 2–1 loss against Sportist Svoge.

In December 2011, Hadzhiev joined Minyor Pernik.

On 1 June 2017, Hadzhiev signed with Beroe.

On 6 July 2022, Pakhtakor Tashkent announced that Hadzhiev had left the club after his contract was terminated by mutual agreement.

In November 2022, he returned to his home country, joining newly promoted Hebar.

On 29 June 2023, Hadzhiev moved to Germany to play for Regionalliga side SSV Jeddeloh. He signed a five-year long-term deal.

== International ==
He was first called up to the Bulgaria national football team in March 2018 for friendlies against Bosnia and Herzegovina and Kazakhstan, but remained on the bench. He made his debut on 14 October 2019 in a Euro 2020 qualifier against England. He started the game and played the whole match, making many mistakes as Bulgaria lost 0–6.

== Career statistics ==
As of 7 June 2021

Club	Season	League		Cup		Europe		Total	
Club	Season	Apps	Goals	Apps	Goals	Apps	Goals	Apps	Goals
Rodopa Smolyan	2006–07	1	0	0	0	—		1	0
Rodopa Smolyan	2007–08	0	0	0	0	—		0	0
Pirin Gotse Delchev	2010–11	30	1	0	0	—		30	1
Minyor Pernik	2011–12	4	0	0	0	—		4	0
Minyor Pernik	2012–13	8	0	3	1	—		11	1
Minyor Pernik	Total	12	0	3	1	0	0	15	1
Lokomotiv Sofia	2013–14	15	1	4	0	—		19	1
Lokomotiv Sofia	2014–15	26	0	3	0	—		29	0
Lokomotiv Sofia	Total	41	1	7	0	0	0	48	1
VfB Oldenburg	2015–16	34	6	0	0	—		34	6
Fortuna Sittard	2016–17	32	2	1	0	—		33	2
Beroe	2017–18	27	1	2	2	—		29	3
Beroe	2018–19	19	0	2	0	—		21	0
Beroe	Total	46	1	4	2	0	0	50	3
Puskás Akadémia	2018–19	15	0	2	0	—		17	0
Puskás Akadémia	2019–20	28	0	3	0	—		31	0
Puskás Akadémia	2020–21	6	0	1	0	1	0	8	0
Puskás Akadémia	Total	49	0	6	0	1	0	56	0
Career total		241	11	21	3	1	0	263	14
