= Veselin Shulev =

Bulgarian footballer

Personal information
- Full name: Veselin Grigorov Shulev
- Date of birth: 12 August 1972 (age 54)
- Place of birth: Stanke Dimitrov, Bulgaria
- Position: Goalkeeper

Senior career*
Years	Team	Apps	(Gls)
1987–1989	Marek	60	(0)
1990	Levski Sofia	1	(0)
1990–1991	Akademik Sofia	28	(0)
1991–1992	Slivnishki Geroy	27	(0)
1992–1993	Haskovo	25	(0)
1993	Spartak Pleven	13	(0)
1994	Slanchev Bryag	12	(0)
1994–2002	Neftochimic	115	(0)

International career
	Bulgaria	1	(0)
- * Club domestic league appearances and goals

Veselin Shulev (Bulgarian: Веселин Шулев) (born 12 August 1972) is a former Bulgarian footballer who played as a goalkeeper.

== Career ==
Shulev spent his entire career in Bulgaria (aside from appearing in friendly matches for Macedonian club Bregalnitsa Stip), chiefly playing in the top division of Bulgarian football, becoming vice-champion of Bulgaria in 1997 with Neftochimic. He also earned one cap for the senior national team.
