= Veliyan Parushev =

Bulgarian footballer

Personal information
- Full name: Veliyan Parushev Mitev
- Date of birth: 20 March 1968
- Place of birth: Sliven, Bulgaria
- Date of death: 29 January 2013 (aged 44)
- Place of death: Burgas, Bulgaria
- Positions: Defender; defensive midfielder

Senior career*
Years	Team	Apps	(Gls)
1986–1991	Sliven	81	(5)
1991–1992	CSKA Sofia	15	(0)
1992–2002	Neftochimic Burgas	139	(31)

International career
1991–1998	Bulgaria	3	(0)

Managerial career
- 2006–2011: Chernomorets (youth team)
- * Club domestic league appearances and goals

Veliyan Parushev Mitev (Bulgarian: Велиян Пaрушев; 20 March 1968 – 29 January 2013) was a Bulgarian footballer who played as a defender.

== Career ==
After starting his career with Sliven, Parushev signed with CSKA Sofia in the early 1990s, where he is best remembered for scoring a last-minute goal against Parma in a UEFA Cup match that enabled the "redmen" to eliminate their opponent on the away goals rule. Parushev subsequently made a name for himself with Neftochimic during a successful period for the team, establishing himself as a highly influential player and also serving as the team captain in the late 1990s.

Following his retirement from the game in the early 2000s, Parushev worked as a truck driver for a German firm. He died of cancer on 29 January 2013.
