= Grisha Ganchev =

Bulgarian businessman and oligarch (born 1962)

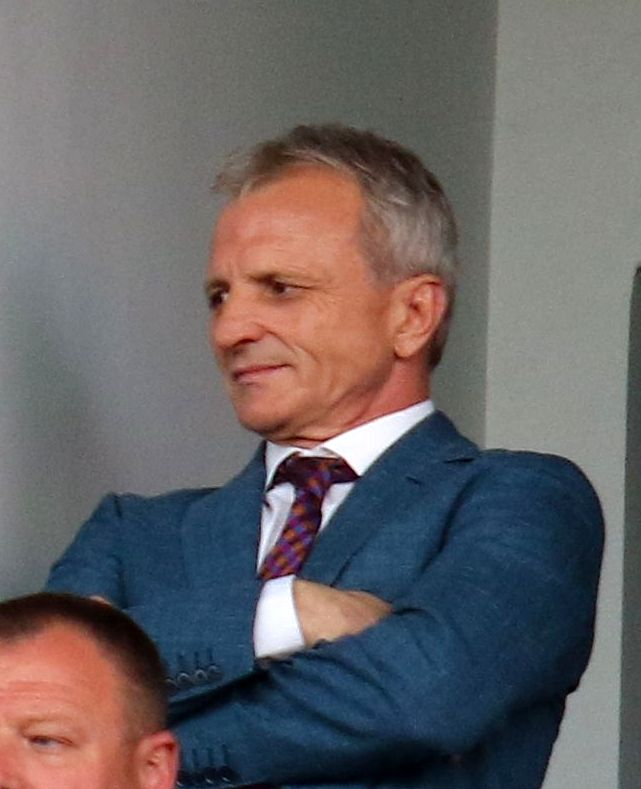
- Born: Grisha Danailov Ganchev; 10 December 1962 (age 63); Mikre, PR Bulgaria
- Education: UNWE
- Occupations: Owner of Litex Motors; Owner of Litex Commerce AD; Shareholder of Petrol AD; Shareholder of Litex Lovech
- Spouse: Temenuzhka Gancheva
- Children: 2

Grisha Ganchev (Bulgarian: Гриша Ганчев; born 10 December 1962) is a Bulgarian businessman and oligarch who is the owner of a multitude of businesses in Bulgaria, such as the oil distributing company Petrol AD which has 470 petrol stations, 80 petrol depots and 3 petrol port terminals throughout the country, Litex Commerce AD company that has a focus on petrol products as well, Litex Motors AD and many others. He was at some point one of the major shareholders of Bulgarian football club CSKA Sofia, but later sold the club to another Bulgarian oligarch Valter Papazki.

== Biography ==
Ganchev attended sports high school "Asen Draganov" in Lovech, specializing in wrestling. He subsequently graduated from the UNWE, earning a degree in accounting and management. Ganchev also completed management studies in St. Louis in 1990, making use of the distance learning option.

He is the founder of the Litex Commerce AD company that specializes in various petrol products. Ganchev also owns the Litex Motors company, a subsidiary and a representative of the Chinese automobile manufacturer Great Wall Motors.

Ganchev has sponsored numerous sports, including football, wrestling, boxing, sambo, volleyball and motor sports.

Since April 2007, he has been a member of the Bulgarian Olympic Committee and since February 2009 of the Bulgarian Football Union.

A former Litex Lovech owner since 1996, which he established as a major force in Bulgarian football, with the club winning four league titles, four Bulgarian Cups as well as a number of other honors, on June 24, 2015, after the Bulgarian club CSKA Sofia faced financial issues, the entrepreneur bought the Sofia team, and in 2016 after a complicated procedure involving the renaming of PFC Litex-Lovech to CSKA-Sofia EAD formed a new company representing CSKA Sofia, which later was recognized by UEFA as the successor of the previous Sofia-based club.

Ganchev is married to Temenuzhka and they have a daughter and a son. He is a horse enthusiast.

== See also ==
- Litex Motors
