= Malin Orachev =

Bulgarian footballer

Personal information
- Full name: Malin Stefanov Orachev
- Date of birth: 3 December 1972 (age 53)
- Place of birth: Kochan, Bulgaria
- Height: 1.78 m (5 ft 10 in)
- Position: Midfielder

Youth career
- 1982–1990: Pirin Blagoevgrad

Senior career*
Years	Team	Apps	(Gls)
1990–1995	Pirin Blagoevgrad	91	(4)
1995–2004	Naftex Burgas	226	(11)
2004–2008	Lokomotiv Sofia	106	(6)
2008–2009	Naftex Burgas	26	(2)
2009–2010	Chernomorets Pomorie	25	(3)
Total		574	(37)

International career
1998–1999	Bulgaria	3	(0)

Managerial career
- 2010–2013: Chernomorets Burgas (youth coach)
- 2013–2017: Pomorie
- 2017–2018: Dunav Ruse
- * Club domestic league appearances and goals

Malin Orachev (Bulgarian: Малин Орачев; born 3 December 1972) is a Bulgarian former footballer.

== Career ==
Orachev started his career in his home town of Blagoevgrad, playing for one of the oldest teams in Bulgaria, Pirin. In June 1995, he signed with Naftex from the town of Burgas. In the following nine years, Malin played for Naftex 226 times and scored 11 goals.

== Coaching career ==
Orachev worked as a head coach of Pomorie for several years until his resignation in September 2017.
