= Dimitar Dimitrov (football manager) =

Bulgarian footballer and manager

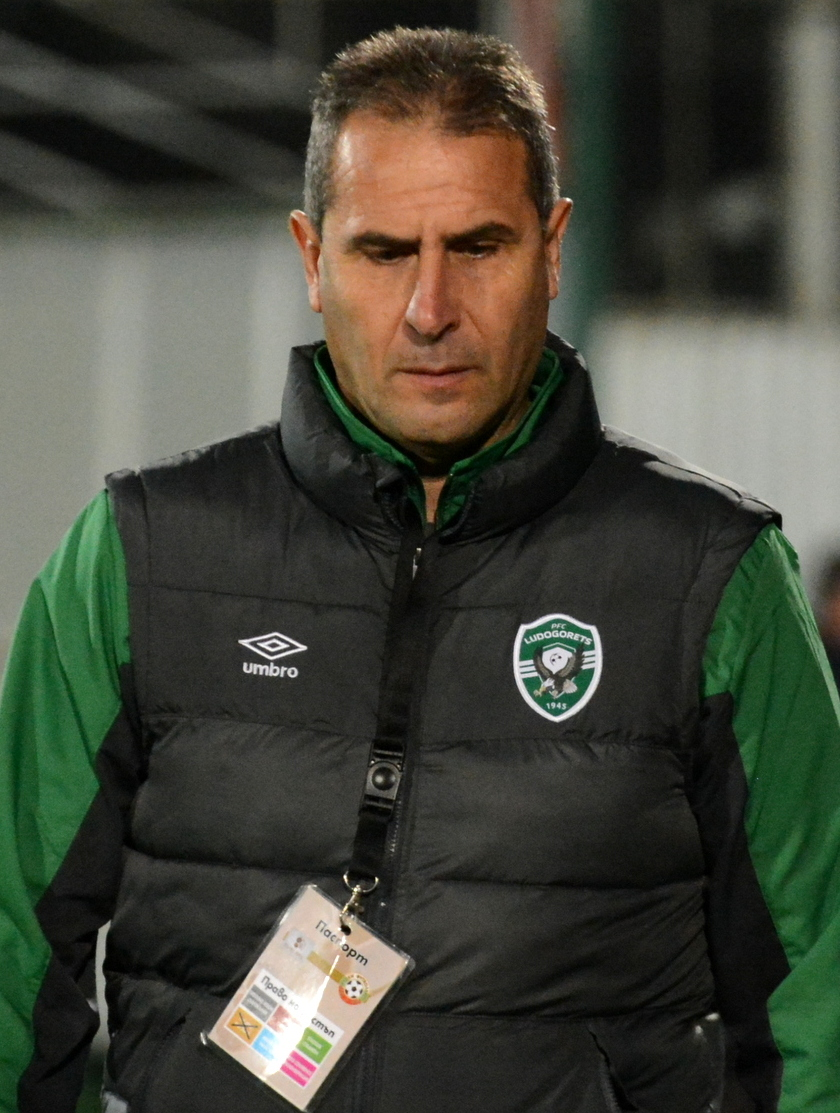

Personal information
- Full name: Dimitar Petrov Dimitrov
- Date of birth: 9 June 1959 (age 67)
- Place of birth: Burgas, Bulgaria
- Height: 1.88 m (6 ft 2 in)
- Position: Defender

Senior career*
Years	Team	Apps	(Gls)
1979–1981	Chernomorets Burgas	14	(0)
1981–1985	Akademik Sofia		

Managerial career
- 1993–1997: Neftochimic Burgas
- 1997–1998: Litex Lovech
- 1998–1999: Bulgaria
- 1999–2000: Litex Lovech
- 2000: Levski Sofia
- 2000–2001: Velbazhd Kyustendil
- 2001–2003: Lokomotiv Plovdiv
- 2003–2004: Naftex Burgas
- 2004–2005: Al-Nassr
- 2006–2008: Chernomorets Burgas
- 2009: Amkar Perm
- 2009–2011: Al-Qadisiya
- 2011–2014: Chernomorets Burgas
- 2014: Botev Plovdiv (director of football)
- 2015–2017: Irtysh Pavlodar
- 2017–2018: Ludogorets Razgrad
- 2018–2019: Irtysh Pavlodar
- 2019–2021: Beroe
- 2021: Arda Kardzhali
- 2023: Spartak Varna
- 2025–2026: Botev Plovdiv
- * Club domestic league appearances and goals

Dimitar Petrov Dimitrov (Bulgarian: Димитър Петров Димитров; born 9 June 1959), nicknamed Héro, is a Bulgarian professional football manager.

Dimitrov represented hometown club Chernomorets Burgas as well Akademik Sofia before a serious injury forced his early retirement.

He has managed Neftochimic Burgas, Litex Lovech, the Bulgaria national team, Levski Sofia, Lokomotiv Plovdiv, Chernomorets Burgas, Amkar Perm, Al-Qadisiya, and Irtysh Pavlodar. As of 22 September 2025, together with Ilian Iliev he holds the record for the most matches as manager in the top flight of Bulgarian football - 491.

Dimitrov is known for his fiery temper and animated manner of coaching. His son, Viktor Dimitrov, has worked as assistant manager.

== Honours ==
=== Coach ===
Neftochimic Burgas

- Bulgarian A Football Group: Runner-up 1995–96
- Cup of PFL Winner: 1996, 1997

Litex Lovech

- Bulgarian A Football Group: 1997–98

Levski Sofia

- Bulgarian A Football Group: 1999–2000
- Bulgarian Cup: 2000

Ludogorets

- First League: 2017–18

== Career statistics ==
As of 21 April 2021

Team	From	To	Record				
Team	From	To	G	W	D	L	Win %
Neftochimic Burgas	1 July 1994	30 June 1997	123	68	23	32	55.28
Litex Lovech	1 July 1997	13 September 1998	30	21	6	3	70.00
Bulgaria	13 September 1998	31 December 1999	11	3	3	5	27.27
Lovech	1 July 1999	31 December 1999	30	15	4	11	50.00
Levski Sofia	1 January 2000	30 June 2000	30	23	5	2	76.67
Velbazhd	1 July 2000	30 June 2001	28	19	4	5	67.86
Lokomotiv Plovdiv	1 July 2001	30 June 2003	62	34	8	20	54.84
Naftex Burgas	1 July 2003	30 June 2004	30	9	8	13	30.00
Al-Nassr	1 July 2004	30 June 2005	22	7	7	8	31.82
Chernomorets Burgas	1 July 2006	14 December 2008	71	36	21	14	50.70
Amkar Perm	14 December 2008	1 September 2009	20	4	6	10	20.00
Al-Qadisiya Al Khubar	19 December 2009	30 May 2011	38	8	12	18	21.05
Chernomorets Burgas	30 May 2011	15 May 2014	98	44	19	35	44.90
Irtysh Pavlodar	1 June 2015	9 August 2017	76	33	19	24	43.42
Ludogorets	10 August 2017	6 June 2018	45	29	10	6	64.44
Irtysh Pavlodar	8 July 2018	28 April 2019	28	10	4	14	35.71
Beroe	24 October 2019	21 April 2021	46	21	7	18	45.65
Total			788	384	166	238	48.73
