= PFC Naftex Burgas =

Naftex (Нафтекс)
- Full name: Професионален футболен клуб Нафтекс Бургас (Professional football club Naftex Burgas)
- Nickname(s): Шейховете (The Sheiks)
- Founded: 1986; 39 years ago
- Dissolved: 2009; 16 years ago
- Ground: Lazur Stadium, Burgas
- Capacity: 18,037
- Chairman: Mitko Sabev
- 2008–09: B PFG, 2nd

PFC Naftex Burgas (Bulgarian: ПФК Нафтекс) is a former football club from Burgas, Bulgaria.

== History ==
The club was created in 1962 by a group of workers, laying the foundations of the future Petroleum Refinery Neftochim, which had not yet been named. The team startеd in A regional group under the name of Stroitel. The team's first-ever friendly game was against Lokomotiv Burgas. In 1964 the Refinery was finally named Neftochim and the team's name was also changed to Neftochimic. In 1965 the team earned its promotion to 2nd Bulgarian division. In its first game in 2nd division, on September 9, 1965, the team played in front of a crowd of 8000 fans. The team players at the time were workers from the refinery, who had been training daily after hours. 1965 was the year when the construction of the new official stadium of the team commenced. The stadium was completed in 1967 and was named "Neftochimic Stadium" ("Стадион Нефтохимик"). The first-ever game played at the stadium was the game between the under-21 teams of Bulgaria and Finland. The primary reason for the stadium construction was to host the home games of Neftochimic. In 1969, after an ill-advised decision by the ruling communist party in Bulgaria, to form a unified Burgas team that would gather the best football players in town, FC Neftochimic was disbanded and the best players of the team left to join the other local team – Chernomorets. From 1969 to 1981 Neftochimic remained a lower-tier club, involved in workers' championships only. The stadium in complex Lazur, however, was still frequented by the same enthusiastic crowd of fans that had supported the team during its years in second division. During those days, the local rival team – FC Chernomorec – tried on numerous occasions to "steal" Neftochimic's stadium. At the time FC Chernomorec was a member of Bulgaria's elite division, but it played its home games at a place called "Kolodruma" which did not suit the team's ambitions. The directors of the "Neftochim" refinery, however, managed to retain ownership of the stadium by creating an inter-refinery workers' championship that was hosted at the stadium. For a period of 12 years Neftochimic was wiped off the map of Bulgarian football. On May 6, 1981, after the stadium of second division club Lokomotiv Burgas (created 1932) was destroyed to leave space for a railway expansion, Lokomotiv decided to merge into FC Neftochimic and start playing its home games at "Neftochimic" stadium. That brought Neftochimic back into professional football and the official name of the team became DSF Neftochimic. The new team was officially registered on January 29, 1986, and this is what has caused a lot of confusion later and is the main source of the misconception that the team has been in existence since 1986 only. The newly formed team started its first season in second division, where Lokomotiv had been playing before the merger.

=== The Portochanov Era (1990–2004) ===
Neftochimic played in the lower divisions in the first four years of the existences of the team. In 1990, Hristo Portochanov took charge of the administration of the club. In his first year as a president, he began the reconstruction of the Neftochimic Stadium and by the year 1997 the stadium was transformed into the best football stadium in Bulgaria and among the best on the Balkan Peninsula. In 1993, Dimitar Dimitrov signed as a manager of the team and it won the Bulgarian Eastern B PFG and qualifies in the Bulgarian top division for the first time in its history. Neftochimic finished at 8th place in its first season and reached the semifinals of the Bulgarian Cup eliminating champions Levski Sofia on its way. The second season in the Bulgarian A PFG was among the most successful season in the history of the club. Neftochimic finished 4th and won the Professional League Cup. In 1997, PFC Neftochimic finished second after a series of referee's mistakes in favor of champions CSKA Sofia and won again the Professional League Cup. In the following years, Neftochimic established itself as one of the best teams in the country regularly finishing in places allowing the team to participate in the UEFA Cup. In the 2000–01 season Neftochimic eliminated AC Omonia Cyprus with 2:1 on aggregate, but later was defeated by Lokomotiv Moscow – 0:0 and 2:4.

On 16 December 2001, the club was renamed Naftex after the oil company that became the majority owner.

=== Difficult years (2004–2009) ===
In year 2004, Portochanov resigned as a president of Naftex and the club began experiencing serious troubles. Many of the very strong and experienced players that brought success to Naftex were sold and the new management managed the club carelessly allowing it to fall out of the Bulgarian A PFG in 2006. From 2006 PFC Naftex is a satellite of PFC Chernomorets. On July 6, 2009, the club is folded. On the next day – July 7 an amateur football club called "Athletic" was renamed to Neftochimic 1986 and was declared by its new owners as successor of the old team.

== Notable players ==
Had international caps for their respective countries, held any club record, or had more than 100 league appearances. Players whose name is listed in bold represented their countries.

Bulgaria

- (Bulgaria) **Veselin Branimirov**
- (Bulgaria) **Simeon Chilibonov**
- (Bulgaria) **Georgi Chilikov**
- (Bulgaria) **Ivan Čvorović**
- (Bulgaria) **Stanimir Dimitrov**
- (Bulgaria) Stanimir Dimov-Valkov
- (Bulgaria) Gancho Evtimov
- (Bulgaria) **Milen Georgiev**
- (Bulgaria) **Yordan Gospodinov**
- (Bulgaria) **Iliya Gruev**
- (Bulgaria) Daniel Hristov
- (Bulgaria) Deyan Hristov
- (Bulgaria) Said Ibraimov
- (Bulgaria) Todor Kiselichkov
- (Bulgaria) **Radostin Kishishev**
- (Bulgaria) Miroslav Kosev
- (Bulgaria) **Georgi Kostadinov**
- (Bulgaria) **Nikolay Krastev**
- (Bulgaria) **Blagomir Mitrev**
- (Bulgaria) **Valentin Naydenov**
- (Bulgaria) **Malin Orachev**
- (Bulgaria) **Veliyan Parushev**
- (Bulgaria) **Veselin Penev**
- (Bulgaria) **Diyan Petkov**
- (Bulgaria) **Stoyko Sakaliev**
- (Bulgaria) **Georgi Sarmov**
- (Bulgaria) **Veselin Shulev**
- (Bulgaria) Anton Spasov
- (Bulgaria) **Vladislav Stoyanov**
- (Bulgaria) **Georgi Terziev**
- (Bulgaria) **Mitko Trendafilov**
- (Bulgaria) **Yanko Valkanov**
- (Bulgaria) **Todor Yanchev**
- (Bulgaria) **Kosta Yanev**
- (Bulgaria) **Zlatko Yankov**
- (Bulgaria) Stanislav Zhekov

South America

- (Chile) **Mario Núñez**

== Stadium ==
Lazur Stadium in Burgas was the home stadium of Naftex. The stadium is currently renamed to efbet Arena Burgas. It has 18,037 seats and a great training and fitness base. It is located in the Lazur complex near the sea garden in Burgas. The stadium has great facilities and has hosted several international games of the Bulgaria national football team. Litex Lovech and Lokomotiv Plovdiv have also played a number of their games for the continental competitions in Burgas.

Lazur Stadium's capacity of 18,037 seats was quite outnumbered in the past by eventually reaching up to 25,000 in derby games between domestic Naftex and leading teams from the country.

== Prominent managers ==
- Ivan Vutov
- Dimitar Stoychev
- Georgi Vasilev
- Dimitar Dimitrov
