= Mitko Sabev =

Bulgarian businessman

Mitko Vasilev Sabev (Bulgarian: Митко Василев Събев) (born October 8, 1961), is a Bulgarian businessman.

Sabev graduated from the higher naval school "Nikola Vaptsarov" in Varna, and then served as chief of the Bulgarian maritime fleet. Co-founder and manager on the "Festa Holding". He is also CEO of Yukos Petroleum Bulgaria Plc and Chairman of the Supervisory Board of Naftex Bulgaria Holding AD. Chairman of the Assembly of Eurobank AD from 2003 to 2005. He is currently chairman of the board of directors of Petrol AD, and chairman of the supervisory board of Petrol AD. Former chairman of PFC Naftex Burgas and the current one of PSFC Chernomorets Burgas.
