= PSFC Chernomorets Burgas =

Football club in Burgas, Bulgaria

Chernomorets Burgas
- Full name: Професионален спортен футболен клуб Черноморец Бургас (Professional sports football club Chernomorets Burgas)
- Nickname: Акулите (The Sharks)
- Founded: 6 July 2005; 20 years ago
- Dissolved: 5 June 2019; 6 years ago
- Ground: Chernomorets Stadium, Burgas
- Capacity: 1,037
- 2018–19: B RFG, 7th
Home colours	Away colours

PSFC Chernomorets Burgas (Bulgarian: ПСФК Черноморец Бургас) or simply Chernomorets (Bulgarian: Черноморец) was a Bulgarian football club from the city of Burgas. The club never won any major competition, its most notable achievement being a second-place finish in the UEFA Intertoto Cup competition in 2008.

The club was founded in 2005, following the folding of the historical FC Chernomorets Burgas, which played numerous seasons in the first tier of Bulgarian football. The new Chernomorets quickly ascended to the first tier and remained there until the 2013–14 season. Financial problems followed, which led to instability and relegations to lower leagues, ultimately to the fifth tier, where the team played last in 2018–19, before being dissolved. Fans and former players from the original club founded FC Chernomorets 1919 Burgas as the successor of the club.

== Club colours ==
Blue	White

=== Kit history ===
Period	Shirt sponsor
2005–2006	none
2006–2007	Petrol AD
2007–2009	none
2009–2011	Quarto
2011–2013	none
2013	Masterhaus
2014–2015	Balneohotel Pomorie

Period	Kit manufacturer
2005–2006	Tomy Sport
2006–2007	Sportika
2007–2009	Nike
2009–2011	Puma
2011–2012	Macron
2012–2013	Legea
2013–2015	Sportika

== Honours ==
=== Domestic ===
- Bulgarian A PFG:
  - Fourth place (1): 2011–12
- Bulgarian Cup:
  - Quarter-finals (2): 2011, 2014
- Cup of Bulgarian Amateur Football League:
  - Winner (1): 2006

=== Continental ===
- UEFA Intertoto Cup:
  - Runners-up (1): 2008

== History ==
=== Founding ===
In the summer of 2005, the club was founded by the mayor of Burgas. Despite the protests of the owner of FC Chernomorets Ivaylo Drazhev, the new club was named OFC Chernomorets 919 and was named as a successor of the current then FC Chernomorets. At the same time, Drazhev formed another club in the capital Sofia under the name PFC Chernomorets Burgas Sofia which only lasted one season and reached many anti-records.

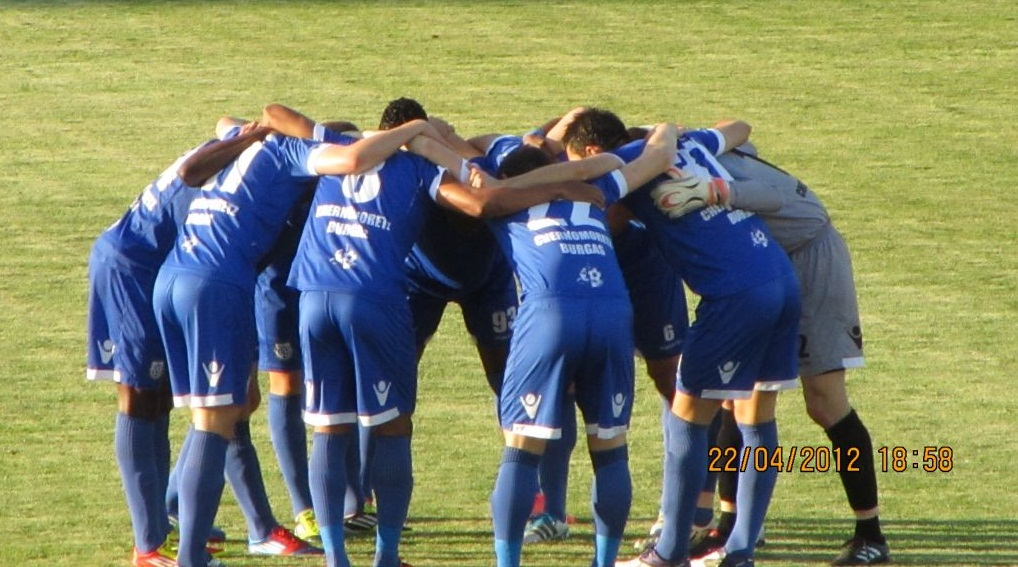
The team in 2012

After a one-season stay in the amateur division, the club easily won the Bulgarian South-East V AFG with Dian Petkov as a head coach, finishing in the 1st place. In June 2006, OFC Chernomorets 919 won the Bulgarian Amateur Cup. In the final at the Vasil Levski National Stadium, Chernomorets won with 4–0 against Benkovski Kostinbrod.

==== Mitko Sabev era, 2006–2019 ====
The same summer, Mitko Sabev, a famous Bulgarian oil magnate and owner of the rival football club in the city Naftex Burgas, bought the club from the municipality and renamed it to PSFC Chernomorets Burgas. (the club is registered in the Bulgarian Football Union as PFC Chernomorets Burgas and is known by that name to the people.) The football club was used as a reserve team for Naftex Burgas. And the owner appointed for manager the famous Bulgarian manager Dimitar Dimitrov.

In 2007, the Sharks won the East B PFG and were promoted to the A PFG. The next season Chernomorets finished 6th and qualified for the Intertoto Cup. In the second round, the Sharks defeated ND Gorica from Slovenia with 3–1 on aggregate to set up a third round clash with Swiss Grasshopper Zurich, but were eliminated with a 0–4 on aggregate.

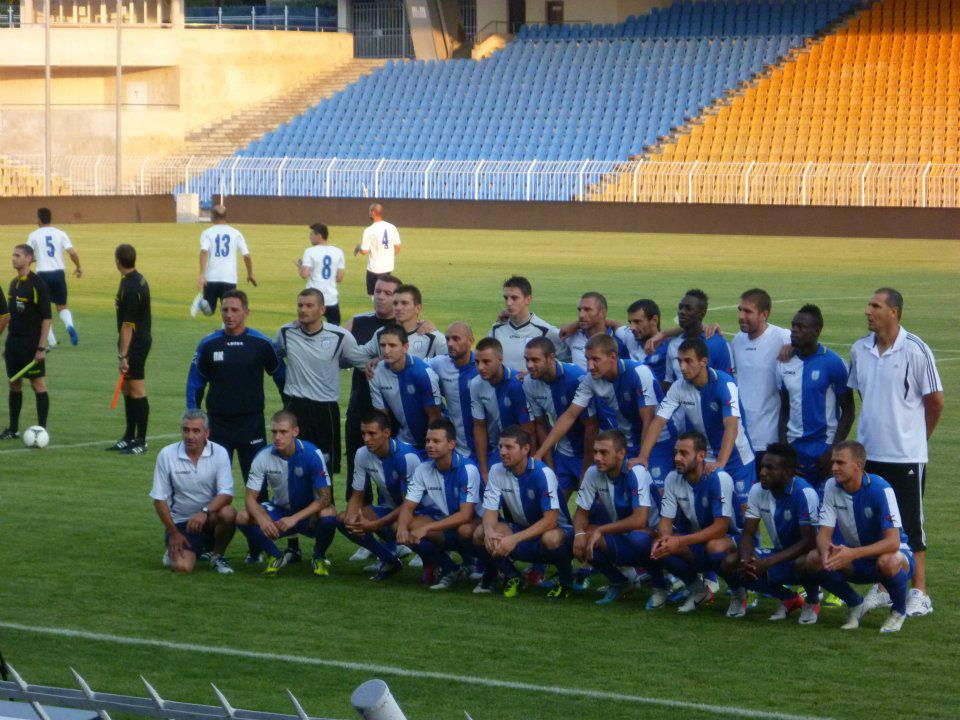
Introduction for 2012/2013

In December 2008, Chernomorets's owner appointed for manager of the football club the notable Bulgarian player Krassimir Balakov, after being sacked from FC St. Gallen. At the end of that season, Mitko Sabev dissolved Naftex Burgas and bought PFC Chernomorets Pomorie from Pomorie, making the new club from the nearby town a reserve team for the main football club.

On 14 January 2010, Chernomorets Burgas was named as the most progressive club in 2009 in Bulgaria. In July 2010, after differences between the owners of Petrol AD the club's budget was severely reduced and many employees from the staff were released. However, on 6 December 2010, Krassimir Balakov was released from Chernomorets Burgas after mutual consent. Second half of the 2010–11 A PFG season was a nightmare for Chernomorets Burgas and the team collapsed to eighth place in the standings while being managed by two more coaches - Anton Velkov and Georgi Vasilev.

On 30 May 2011, Mitko Sabev appointed as manager for the second time Dimitar Dimitrov – Hero. He founded high quality players for free like Jugurtha Hamroun, Lourival Assis, Aatif Chahechouche, and Yannick Boli, with Chernomorets Burgas having his best season in club history in the Bulgarian A PFG – a 4th place with real chances to reach the Europa League until the end. However, little was not enough and the club eventually didn't qualify.

==== The huge come-down: From A Group to B Regional in 5 years and extinction ====
After 2013/2014 season Chernomorets Burgas was relegated after 7 years in the A PFG. In the next season, they were unable to bounce back and lost their professional status after suffering another relegation - to the V group. The team was relegated again in A Regional Group and again finished on the last place, but was administratively saved from relegate, even finishing on negative points. The next season was nevertheless better and the team finished was relegated to the B RFG after a last-place finish, marking 4 relegations in a row and moving from the top football level to the lowest. They finished the 2018–19 season in the B Regional League in 7th place and on 5 July 2019 the team declared bankruptcy, which was followed by the team dissolving.

== Historical achievements ==
=== Historical names ===
2005–06	OFC Chernomorets 919
2006	PSFC Chernomorets Burgas

=== Performance by seasons ===
Season	League	Level	Pos.	Pl.	W	D	L	GS	GA	P	Cup	Notes
2005–06	V AFG	3	1	30	29	1	0	122	9	88	1/16	Promoted
2006–07	B PFG	2	1	26	19	6	1	57	20	63	1/8	Promoted
2007–08	A PFG	1	6	30	13	8	9	39	32	47	1/8	
2008–09	A PFG	1	7	30	11	10	9	41	37	43	1/8	
2009–10	A PFG	1	5	30	15	6	9	44	29	51	1/8	
2010–11	A PFG	1	8	30	9	10	11	19	28	37	1/4	
2011–12	A PFG	1	4	30	17	9	4	57	23	60	1/8	
2012–13	A PFG	1	6	30	14	5	11	32	28	47	1/8	
2013–14	A PFG	1	11	38	13	5	20	56	62	44	1/4	Relegated
2014–15	B PFG	2	14	30	7	7	16	25	40	28	1/16	Relegated
2015–16	V AFG	3	17	34	6	4	24	42	100	19	DNQ	Relegated
2016–17	A RFG	4	13	24	1	1	22	21	107	–2	DNQ	
2017–18	A RFG	4	12	22	6	0	16	34	80	12	DNQ	Relegated
2018–19	B RFG	5	7	20	9	1	10	66	61	22	DNQ	Dissolved

=== European ===
Intertoto Cup

2008	UEFA Intertoto Cup	2nd Round	(Slovenia)	ND Gorica	1–1	2–0	3–1
2008	UEFA Intertoto Cup	3rd Round	(Switzerland)	Grasshopper	0–1	0–3	0–4

== Stadium and Sports Complex ==
Chernomorets plays its home games at the Lazur Stadium. Lazur Stadium is a multi-use stadium in Burgas, Bulgaria. It is currently used mostly for football matches. The stadium holds 18,037 people and it is 3 star rated by UEFA. The stadium was opened in 1967 and was renovated in 1997 and 2009.

Chernomorets Arena is a future modern stadium in Burgas, which is going to be the new home ground of Chernomorets Burgas. The new venue will be built in the place of the old home ground of FC Chernomorets, the Chernomorets Stadium, and will have a capacity of 30,000 spectators and a possible expansion to 55,000. It is scheduled to be opened in 2017. Construction was delayed to the summer of 2013, because of the demolishing process of the old stadium and the 2008 financial crisis, and will cost 500 million euros, making it one of the most expensive stadiums in Europe. The stadium will be probably rated with an elite ranking by UEFA and will host Champions League and Europa League matches in Burgas and Eastern Bulgaria.

In July 2009, the owner of the club announced an ambitious plan to build a modern sports complex for the club in the Sarafovo neighborhood of Burgas. The sports complex will be named Sharks Nest and will include two training pitches and one training pitch with artificial turf, an administrative building for the team and one building for the management of the football club. The construction of the sports complex started the same month and was finished in July 2010 at a cost of €20 million.

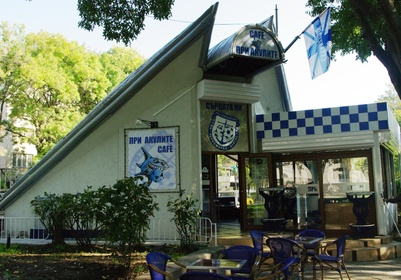
Former Fanclub

== Notable players ==
- For all players with a Wikipedia article see Category:PSFC Chernomorets Burgas players.

== Managers ==
- (Bulgaria) Diyan Petkov (2005–06)
- (Bulgaria) Dimitar Dimitrov (1 July 2006 – 17 December 2008)
- (Bulgaria) Krasimir Balakov (17 December 2008 – 7 December 2010)
- (Bulgaria) Anton Velkov (5 January 2011 – 23 March 2011)
- (Bulgaria) Georgi Vasilev (23 March 2011 – 30 May 2011)
- (Bulgaria) Dimitar Dimitrov (30 May 2011 – 15 May 2014)
- (Bulgaria) Todor Kiselichkov (13 June 2014 – 5 October 2014)
- (Bulgaria) Erolin Kyuchukov (18 July 2015 – present)
