= Petrol AD =

- Native name: Петрол АД
- Company type: Joint Stock Company
- ISIN: BG11PESOBT13
- Industry: Oil
- Founded: 1932
- Headquarters: Sofia, Bulgaria
- Key people: Grisha Ganchev
- Products: fuels; non-fuel goods
- Revenue: ▲US$3.12 billion (2008)
- Net income: 2,645,000 Bulgarian lev (2023)
- Total assets: 328,717,000 Bulgarian lev (2023)
- Subsidiaries: Petrol Technologies OOD; Petrol Finances OOD; Petrol Finance EOOD; Petrol Properties EOOD; Storage Oil EAD; Storage Invest EOOD; Elit Petrol - Lovech AD; Lozen Asset AD; Varna Storage EOOD

Petrol AD (Bulgarian: Петрол АД) is a Bulgarian oil distribution company which maintains the largest network of filling stations in the country, consisting of more than 330 retail outlets, 80 petrol depots and three petrol port terminals. The company was established in April 1932, in the capital city of Sofia, and privatized in 1999. Currently, Petrol AD is a joint stock company engaged in storage, transportation and retail of fuels and petrol products. Petrol AD has adopted a two-tier management system, with a Management Board and a Supervisory Board.

== History ==
Established in 1932, Petrol AD occupies a leading position in the distribution of fuels and oils in Bulgaria. With more than 330 petrol stations under the Petrol brand, evenly distributed throughout the country, the company has the most developed fuel distribution network in the country. Today, the company is among the largest Bulgarian public companies by market capitalization. In 2003, the company received an award for issuer of the year, providing the most complete and accurate corporate information on the Bulgarian Stock Exchange.

=== Timeline ===
- On April 1, 1932, the Bulgarian Joint Stock Company Petrol was established. Initially, the company used the warehouse of one of the shareholders, gradually investing and building new facilities.
- In 1947 the Bulgarian oil industry was nationalized. On February 18, 1948, the Grand National Assembly passed a law on the state monopoly over petroleum products.
- On March 9, 1948, on the basis of the existing private and joint-stock companies, the state supply company Petrol was established. The aim is to limit the enrichment of the former owners, and the purpose is to supply the national economy with the necessary oil derivatives through the branches in the country. It is gradually expanding its activities, gas stations and oil depots are being built throughout the country.
- In 1986 the association was transformed into a Petrol plant, which was included in the structure of the Chimsnab Economic Association.
- In 1990, on the basis of the new legislation, the plant was reorganized into the state company Petrol.
- On July 1, 1992, a sole proprietorship joint-stock company Petrol with all state ownership was established. As a result of the mass privatization, about 25% of the company's shares become the property of privatization funds and industrial shareholders.
- On June 10, 1997, Petrol Joint Stock Company was re-established.
- On July 1, 1999, after nearly two years of privatization procedures, the sale of the majority stake was completed. Fifty-one percent of the state's shares were sold to Bulgaria International Consortium.
- On August 4, 1999, the company was privatized by the consortium led by Naftex Bulgaria Holding AD and including OMV (Austria) and Petrol Holding Group AD. Subsequently, Naftex Bulgaria Holding AD increased its stake in Petrol AD by buying out the shares of the other participants in the consortium.

== Activities ==
The main activities of Petrol AD are:

- retail of fuels and petroleum products,
- retail of non-fuel goods,
- maintenance of fuel facilities and filling stations.

== Management ==
=== Supervisory Board ===
- Chairman of the Supervisory Board: Petrol Correct EOOD, represented by Nikolay Gergov
- Member of the Supervisory Board: Petrol Asset Management EOOD, represented by Armen Nazaryan

=== Management Board ===
- Chairman of the Board: Grisha Ganchev
- Deputy Chairman of the Management Board, Executive Director: Georgi Tatarski
- Member of the Management Board, Executive Director: Milko Dimitrov
- Member of the Management Board: Lachezar Gramatikov
- Member of the Management Board: Kiril Shilegov

== See also ==
- Litex Motors
- PFC Litex
