= 2006–07 PFC Levski Sofia season =

Levski Sofia
2006–07 season
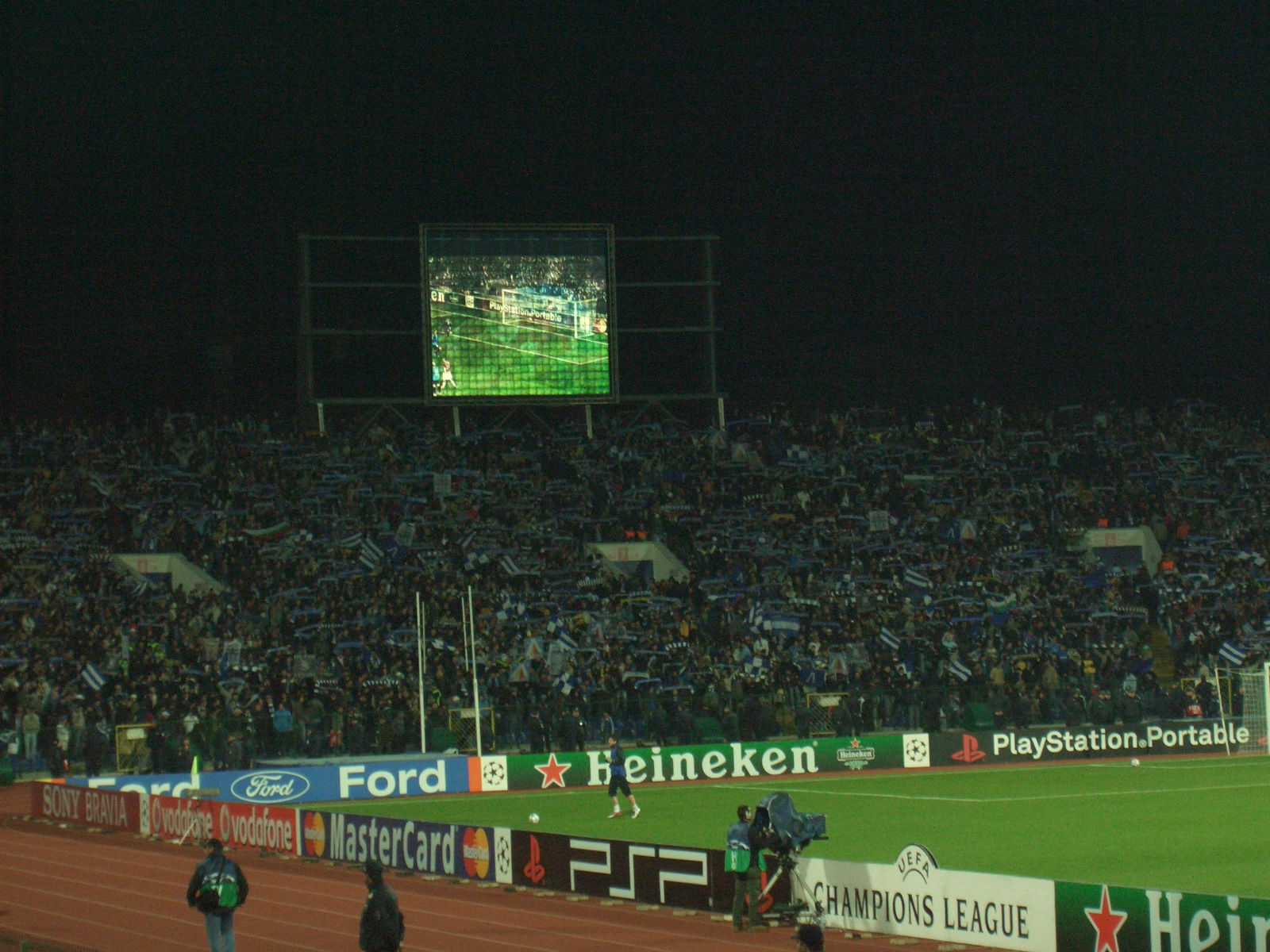
- Levski vs. Werder Bremen, 2006–07 UEFA Champions League
- Chairman: Todor Batkov
- Manager: Stanimir Stoilov
- Stadium: Georgi Asparuhov Stadium (domestic games); Vasil Levski National Stadium (European matches)
- A Group: Champions
- Bulgarian Cup: Winners
- Bulgarian Supercup: Runners-up
- Champions League: Group stage
- Top goalscorer: League: Valeri Domovchiyski (15 goals); All: Valeri Domovchiyski (20 goals)
Home colours	Away colours

The 2006–07 season was Levski Sofia's 85th season in the First League. This article shows player statistics and all matches (official and friendly) that the club has played during the 2006–07 season.

== First-team squad ==
Squad at end of season

Note: Flags indicate national team as defined under FIFA eligibility rules; some limited exceptions apply. Players may hold more than one non-FIFA nationality.

No.	Pos.	Nation	Player
1	GK	BUL	Georgi Petkov
2	DF	BRA	Dianu (on loan from PFC Belasitsa)
3	DF	BUL	Zhivko Milanov
4	DF	BUL	Igor Tomasic
6	MF	NGR	Richard Eromoigbe
7	MF	BUL	Daniel Borimirov
10	MF	BUL	Hristo Yovov
11	DF	BUL	Elin Topuzakov
12	GK	BUL	Bozhidar Mitrev
14	DF	BUL	Veselin Minev
15	FW	ISR	Eli Zizov
16	MF	BUL	Mariyan Ognyanov

No.	Pos.	Nation	Player
17	FW	BUL	Valeri Domovchiyski
18	MF	BUL	Miroslav Ivanov
20	MF	BUL	Stanislav Angelov
21	MF	BUL	Dimitar Telkiyski
23	FW	NGR	Ekundayo Jayeoba
24	MF	BUL	Nikolay Dimitrov
25	DF	BRA	Lucio Wagner
27	MF	FRA	Cedric Bardon
28	FW	BUL	Emil Angelov
77	MF	BUL	Milan Koprivarov
88	GK	BUL	Nikolay Mihaylov

=== Left club during season ===
Note: Flags indicate national team as defined under FIFA eligibility rules; some limited exceptions apply. Players may hold more than one non-FIFA nationality.

No.	Pos.	Nation	Player
8	DF	BUL	Bogomil Dyakov (to Spartak Varna)
9	FW	BUL	Georgi Ivanov (to Rijeka)

No.	Pos.	Nation	Player
13	DF	BUL	Nikolay Nikolov (to Chernomorets Burgas)
19	MF	BUL	Atanas Bornosuzov (to Terek)

== Competitions ==
=== Bulgarian Supercup ===
30 July 2006	Levski Sofia	0–0 (a.e.t.) (0–3 p)	CSKA Sofia	Sofia
20:00				Stadium: Vasil Levski Stadium; Attendance: 9,751; Referee: Momchil Vraykov (Pleven)
	Penalties
	Topuzakov (penalty missed); Domovchiyski (penalty missed); Borimirov (penalty missed)		(penalty scored) Trică; (penalty scored) Todorov; (penalty scored) Petre

=== A Group ===
==== Table ====
Pos	Team	Pld	W	D	L	GF	GA	GD	Pts	Qualification or relegation
1	Levski Sofia (C)	30	24	5	1	96	13	+83	77	Qualification for Champions League second qualifying round
2	CSKA Sofia	30	23	3	4	68	13	+55	72 (Note: CSKA Sofia ahead of Lokomotiv Sofia on head-to-head record; Lokomotiv Sofia–CSKA Sofia 1–1, CSKA Sofia–Lokomotiv Sofia 4–1.)	Qualification for UEFA Cup second qualifying round
3	Lokomotiv Sofia	30	23	3	4	70	28	+42	72	Qualification for UEFA Cup second qualifying round
4	Litex Lovech	30	19	5	6	65	29	+36	62	Qualification for UEFA Cup first qualifying round
5	Slavia Sofia	30	14	7	9	47	75	−28	49	

Source: A PFG (in Bulgarian)
Rules for classification: 1st points; 2nd head-to-head points; 3rd head-to-head goal difference; 4th head-to-head goals scored; 5th head-to-head away goals scored; 6th goal difference; 7th goals scored; 8th "sportsmanship" (R & Y cards); 9th draw
(C) Champions

==== Results summary ====
Overall								Home						Away					
Pld	W	D	L	GF	GA	GD	Pts	W	D	L	GF	GA	GD	W	D	L	GF	GA	GD
30	24	5	1	96	13	+83	77	15	0	0	63	3	+60	9	5	1	33	10	+23

Last updated: 27 May 2007.
Source: Soccerway

==== Results by round ====
Round	1	2	3	4	5	6	7	8	9	10	11	12	13	14	15	16	17	18	19	20	21	22	23	24	25	26	27	28	29	30
Ground	A	H	A	H	A	H	A	H	A	H	A	H	A	H	A	H	A	H	A	H	A	H	A	H	A	H	A	H	A	H
Result	W	W	D	W	W	W	W	W	W	W	D	W	W	W	D	W	W	W	L	W	W	W	W	W	D	W	D	W	W	W
Position	1	1	3	3	3	2	1	1	1	1	1	1	1	1	1	1	1	1	1	1	1	1	1	1	1	1	1	1	1	1

A = Away; H = Home; W = Win; D = Draw; L = Loss

==== Fixtures and results ====
5 August 2006 1	Chernomorets BS	0–3 (w/o)	Levski Sofia	Sofia
(EET)		Report		Stadium: Vasil Levski National Stadium
Note: Match awarded as Chernomorets Burgas Sofia failed to register five youth players.

12 August 2006 2	Levski Sofia	3–0	Spartak Varna	Sofia
(EET)	Yovov 45'; G. Ivanov 49', 82'	Report		Stadium: Georgi Asparuhov Stadium; Attendance: 2,000; Referee: Ivaylo Bozev

19 August 2006 3	Vihren Sandanski	0–0	Levski Sofia	Sofia
(EET)		Report		Stadium: Balgarska Armia; Attendance: 1,500; Referee: Tsvetan Georgiev

27 August 2006 4	Levski Sofia	5–0	Rilski Sportist	Sofia
(EET)	Bardon 11'; Borimirov 23'; Telkiyski 53' (pen.); G. Ivanov 85'; Domovchiyski 90'	Report		Stadium: Georgi Asparuhov Stadium; Attendance: 10,000; Referee: Angel Angelov

9 September 2006 5	Marek Dupnitsa	0–8	Levski Sofia	Dupnitsa
(EET)		Report	Koprivarov 14'; E. Angelov 18', 45', 79'; G. Ivanov 22', 31', 72'; Eromoigbe 59' (pen.)	Stadium: Bonchuk; Attendance: 0 Referee: Nikolay Yordanov

17 September 2006 6	Levski Sofia	1–0	CSKA Sofia	Sofia
(EET)	Bardon 48' (pen.)	Report		Stadium: Vasil Levski National Stadium; Attendance: 11,432; Referee: Hristo Ristoskov

22 September 2006 7	Rodopa Smolyan	0–3	Levski Sofia	Smolyan
(EET)		Report	Stoychev 45'; G. Ivanov 52', 61'	Stadium: Septemvri; Attendance: 2,000; Referee: Stanislav Todorov

1 October 2006 8	Levski Sofia	2–0	Slavia Sofia	Sofia
(EET)	Yovov 9'; Telkiyski 52'	Report		Stadium: Georgi Asparuhov Stadium; Attendance: 9,500; Referee: Angel Bekyarov

14 October 2006 9	Belasitsa Petrich	0–1	Levski Sofia	Petrich
(EET)		Report	Koprivarov 55'	Stadium: Tsar Samuil Stadium; Attendance: 4,000; Referee: Tsvetan Georgiev

23 October 2006 10	Levski Sofia	3–0	Botev Plovdiv	Sofia
(EET)	Domovchiyski 8'; M. Ivanov 59', 83'	Report		Stadium: Georgi Asparuhov Stadium; Attendance: 5,500; Referee: Stefan Spasov

27 October 2006 11	Cherno More	1–1	Levski Sofia	Varna
(EET)	Moke 65'	Report	Domovchiyski 15'	Stadium: Ticha Stadium; Attendance: 10,000; Referee: Nikolay Yordanov

4 November 2006 12	Levski Sofia	3–0	Beroe	Sofia
(EET)	Telkiyski 23' (pen.); M. Ivanov 33'; Yovov 49'	Report		Stadium: Georgi Asparuhov Stadium; Attendance: 1,000; Referee: Petar Stoyanov

12 November 2006 13	Lokomotiv Plovdiv	1–3	Levski Sofia	Plovdiv
(EET)	Dakson 57'	Report	Bardon 19'; Yovov 51', 61'	Stadium: Lokomotiv; Attendance: 6,500; Referee: Kolyo Danev

18 November 2006 14	Levski Sofia	3–0	Lokomotiv Sofia	Sofia
(EET)	Domovchiyski 47'; Yovov 56'; G. Ivanov 70'	Report		Stadium: Georgi Asparuhov Stadium; Attendance: 7,000; Referee: Stanislav Todorov

26 November 2006 15	Litex Lovech	0–0	Levski Sofia	Lovech
(EET)		Report		Stadium: Lovech Stadium; Attendance: 5,000; Referee: Michael Weiner (Germany)

3 March 2007 16	Levski Sofia	10–0	Chernomorets BS	Sofia
(EET)	M. Ivanov 4'; Sarmov 28'; Domovchiyski 38', 67', 89'; Telkiyski 43'; Lucio Wagner 61'; Dimitrov 72'; Koprivarov 82', 85'	Report		Stadium: Vasil Levski National Stadium; Attendance: 10,000; Referee: Georgi Yordanov

11 March 2007 17	Spartak Varna	1–2	Levski Sofia	Varna
(EET)	Filipov 87'	Report	Borimirov 19'; Koprivarov 62'	Stadium: Spartak; Attendance: 3,000; Referee: Stefan Spasov

3 March 2007 16	Levski Sofia	4–0	Vihren Sandanski	Sofia
(EET)	Domovchiyski 10'; Yovov 52', 57'; Sarmov 71'	Report		Stadium: Vasil Levski National Stadium; Attendance: 12,000; Referee: Stanislav Todorov

21 March 2007 19	Rilski Sportist	2–1	Levski Sofia	Samokov
(EET)	Aleksandrov 47'; Kostadinov 50'	Report	Telkiyski 13' (pen.)	Stadium: Iskar Stadium; Attendance: 4,000; Referee: Aleksandar Kostadinov

1 April 2007 20	Levski Sofia	8–0	Marek Dupnitsa	Sofia
(EET)	Telkiyski 13' (pen.); Bardon 45' (pen.); Milanov 54'; E. Angelov 66', 83'; Jayeoba 75'; Dimitrov 85' (pen.), 89'	Report		Stadium: Vasil Levski National Stadium; Attendance: 6,000; Referee: Hristo Ristoskov

7 April 2007 21	CSKA Sofia	0–1	Levski Sofia	Sofia
(EET)		Report	Yovov 19'	Stadium: Vasil Levski National Stadium; Attendance: 20,000; Referee: Helmut Fleischer (Germany)

14 April 2007 22	Levski Sofia	3–0	Rodopa Smolyan	Sofia
(EET)	E. Angelov 14', 43'; Uchikov 83' (o.g.)	Report		Stadium: Georgi Asparuhov Stadium; Attendance: 4,500; Referee: Angel Angelov

18 April 2007 23	Slavia Sofia	0–3	Levski Sofia	Sofia
(EET)		Report	Bardon 25', 30', 76'	Stadium: Slavia Stadium; Attendance: 5,500; Referee: Еrve Picherelo (France)

22 April 2007 24	Levski Sofia	1–0	Belasitsa Petrich	Sofia
(EET)	Domovchiyski 60'	Report		Stadium: Georgi Asparuhov Stadium; Attendance: 4,500; Referee: Ivan Angelov

29 April 2007 23	Botev Plovdiv	2–2	Levski Sofia	Plovdiv
(EET)	Urumov 22'; Kakalov 63'	Report	Yovov 14'; Domovchiyski 69'	Stadium: Hristo Botev Stadium; Attendance: 14,000; Referee: Darko Čeferin (Slovenia)

5 May 2007 26	Levski Sofia	5–0	Cherno More	Sofia
(EET)	Yovov 7', 88'; Domovchiyski 20'; Telkiyski 52' (pen.), 66'	Report		Stadium: Georgi Asparuhov Stadium; Attendance: 6,300; Referee: Tsvetan Georgiev

13 May 2007 27	Beroe	0–0	Levski Sofia	Stara Zagora
(EET)		Report		Stadium: Beroe Stadium; Attendance: 10,000; Referee: Stanislav Todorov

16 May 2007 28	Levski Sofia	6–1	Lokomotiv Plovdiv	Sofia
(EET)	E. Angelov 8', 78'; Radev 19' (o.g.); Jayeoba 51', 67'; Stoychev 89'	Report	Vandev 42'	Stadium: Georgi Asparuhov Stadium; Attendance: 5,000; Referee: Stefan Spasov

19 May 2007 29	Lokomotiv Sofia	3–5	Levski Sofia	Sofia
(EET)	Dafchev 14', 90'; Karadzhinov 53'	Report	Domovchiyski 2', 15', 56'; Bardon 22'; Yovov 30'	Stadium: Lokomotiv Stadium; Attendance: 8,000; Referee: Gianlucca Rocci (Italy)

27 May 2007 30	Levski Sofia	6–2	Litex Lovech	Sofia
(EET)	Domovchiyski 45' (pen.); M. Ivanov 69'; Borimirov (72[]), 90'; S. Angelov 86'; Jayeoba 88'	Report	Bibishkov 14'; Cichero 59'	Stadium: Georgi Asparuhov Stadium; Attendance: 20,000; Referee: Robert Krajnc (Slovenia)

=== Bulgarian Cup ===
8 November 2006 Second round	Neftohimik Burgas	2–3	Levski Sofia	Burgas
(EET)	Bozhinov 28'; Lubenov 52'	Report	Domovchiyski 58'; G. Ivanov 69' (pen.); Telkiyski 81'	Stadium: Lazur Stadium; Attendance: 9,000; Referee: Stefan Spasov

30 November 2006 Third round	PSFC Chernomorets	0–1 (a.e.t.)	Levski Sofia	Burgas
(EET)		Report	Domovchiyski 112'	Stadium: Lazur Stadium; Attendance: 8,000; Referee: Hristo Ristoskov

11 April 2007 Quarterfinal	Pirin Blagoevgrad	0–0 (a.e.t.) (2–4 p)	Levski Sofia	Blagoevgrad
(EET)		Report		Stadium: Hristo Botev Stadium; Attendance: 6,500; Referee: Stoyan Aleksiev
	Penalties
	Dyakov (penalty scored); Metushev (penalty scored); Markov (penalty missed); Hazurov (penalty missed)		(penalty scored) Telkiyski; (penalty scored) Bardon; (penalty scored) Domovchiyski; (penalty missed) Milanov; (penalty scored) Tomašić

9 May 2007 Semifinal	Lokomotiv Plovdiv	0–3	Levski Sofia	Plovdiv
(EET)		Report	Yovov 17'; Domovchiyski 57' Borimirov 65'	Stadium: Lokomotiv Stadium; Attendance: 10,000; Referee: Ruud Boossen (Netherlands)

24 May 2007 Final	Levski Sofia	1–0	Litex Lovech	Stara Zagora
(EET)	Bardon 111' (pen.)	Report		Stadium: Beroe Stadium; Attendance: 13,000; Referee: Ľuboš Micheľ (Slovakia)

=== Champions League ===
==== Second qualifying round ====
26 July 2006 1st leg	Levski Sofia (Bulgaria)	2–0	(Georgia (country)) Sioni Bolnisi	Sofia, Bulgaria
19:30	E. Angelov 20'; Borimirov 82' (pen.)	Report MatchCentre		Stadium: Georgi Asparuhov Stadium; Attendance: 11,075; Referee: Fritz Stuchlik (Austria)

2 August 2006 2nd leg	Sioni Bolnisi (Georgia (country))	0–2 (0−4 agg.)	(Bulgaria) Levski Sofia	Tbilisi, Georgia
16:00		Report MatchCentre	Domovchiyski 28'; E. Angelov 90+1'	Stadium: Mikheil Meskhi Stadium; Attendance: 6,000; Referee: Selcuk Dereli (Turkey)

==== Third qualifying round ====
9 August 2006 1st leg	Levski Sofia (Bulgaria)	2–0	(Italy) Chievo	Sofia, Bulgaria
19:30	Domovchiyski 8'; Bardon 86' (pen.)	Report MatchCentre		Stadium: Vasil Levski National Stadium; Attendance: 18,949; Referee: Jaroslav Jara (Czech Republic)

23 August 2006 2nd leg	Chievo (Italy)	2–2 (2−4 agg.)	(Bulgaria) Levski Sofia	Verona, Italy
21:00	Amauri 48', 81'	Report MatchCentre	Telkiyski 34'; Bardon 46'	Stadium: Stadio Marc'Antonio Bentegodi; Attendance: 23,517; Referee: Lucilio Batista (Portugal)

==== Group stage ====
Pos	Team	Pld	W	D	L	GF	GA	GD	Pts	Qualification	CHE	BAR	BRM	LSO
1	(England) Chelsea	6	4	1	1	10	4	+6	13	Advance to knockout stage	—	1–0	2–0	2–0
2	(Spain) Barcelona	6	3	2	1	12	4	+8	11	Advance to knockout stage	2–2	—	2–0	5–0
3	(Germany) Werder Bremen	6	3	1	2	7	5	+2	10	Transfer to UEFA Cup	1–0	1–1	—	2–0
4	(Bulgaria) Levski Sofia	6	0	0	6	1	17	−16	0		1–3	0–2	0–3	—

Source: RSSSF

12 September 2006 1	Barcelona (Spain)	5–0	(Bulgaria) Levski Sofia	Barcelona, Spain
20:45	Iniesta 7'; Giuly 39'; Puyol 49'; Eto'o 58'; Ronaldinho 90+3'	Report MatchCentre		Stadium: Camp Nou; Attendance: 91,000; Referee: Konrad Plautz (Austria)

27 September 2006 2	Levski Sofia (Bulgaria)	1–3	(England) Chelsea	Sofia, Bulgaria
20:45	Ognyanov 89'	Report MatchCentre	Drogba 39', 52', 68'	Stadium: Vasil Levski National Stadium; Attendance: 27,950; Referee: Laurent Duhamel (France)

18 October 2006 3	Werder Bremen (Germany)	2–0	(Bulgaria) Levski Sofia	Bremen, Germany
20:45	Naldo 45+1'; Diego 73'	Report MatchCentre		Stadium: Weserstadion; Attendance: 41,000; Referee: Paul Allaerts (Belgium)

31 October 2006 4	Levski Sofia (Bulgaria)	0–3	(Germany) Werder Bremen	Sofia, Bulgaria
20:45		Report MatchCentre	Mikhailov 33' (o.g.); Baumann 35'; Frings 37'	Stadium: Vasil Levski National Stadium; Attendance: 40,000; Referee: Matteo Trefoloni (Italy)

22 November 2006 5	Levski Sofia (Bulgaria)	0–2	(Spain) Barcelona	Sofia, Bulgaria
20:45		Report MatchCentre	Giuly 5'; Iniesta 65'	Stadium: Vasil Levski National Stadium; Attendance: 38,000; Referee: Yuri Baskakov (Russia)

5 December 2006 6	Chelsea (England)	2–0	(Bulgaria) Levski Sofia	London, England
20:45	Shevchenko 27'; Wright-Phillips 83'	Report MatchCentre		Stadium: Stamford Bridge; Attendance: 33,358; Referee: Alain Hamer (Luxembourg)
