= 2007 Bulgarian Cup final =

Football match

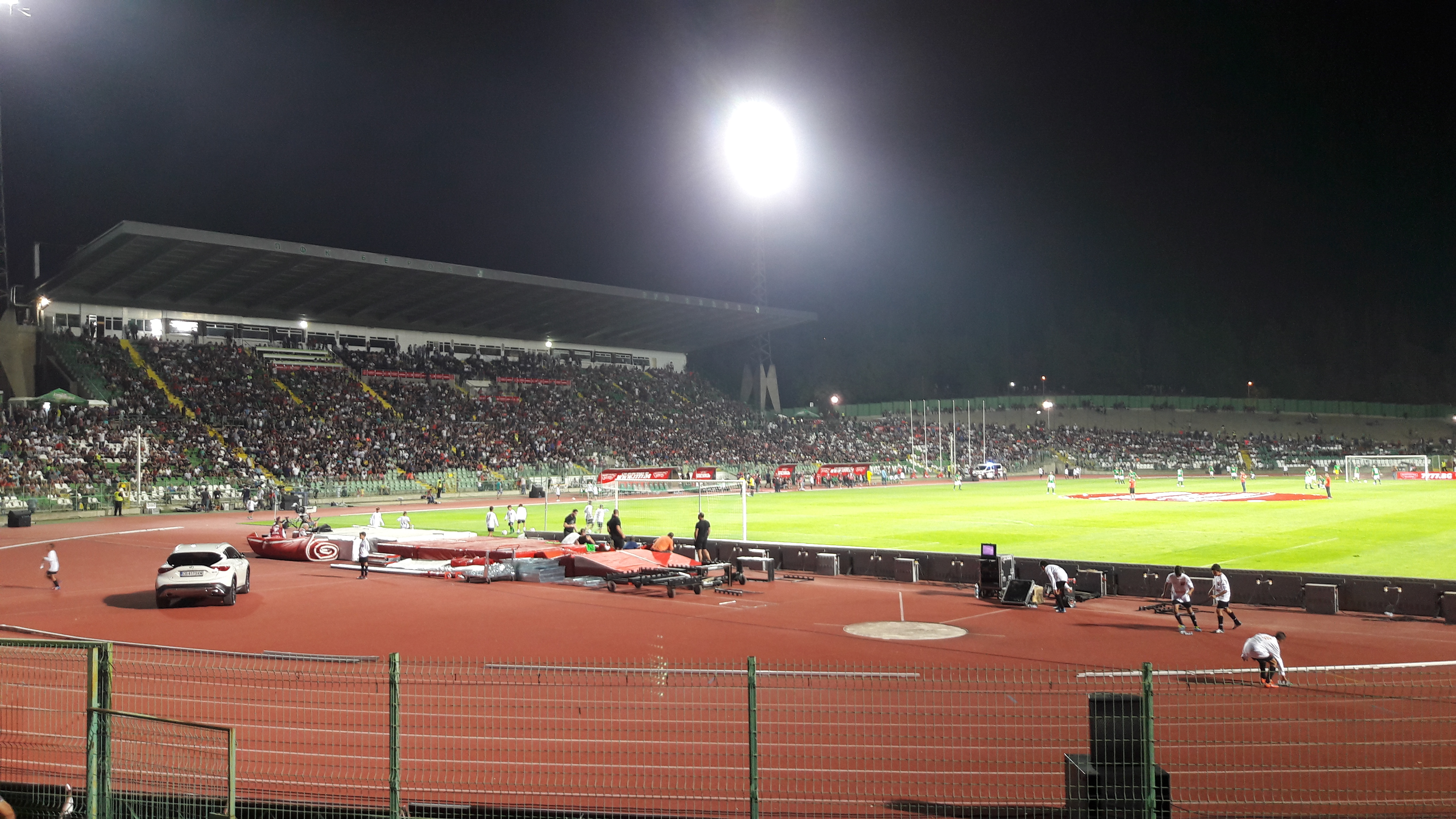
- Event: 2006–07 Bulgarian Cup
Levski Sofia	Litex Lovech
A Group	A Group
1	0
- Date: 24 May 2007
- Venue: Stadion Beroe, Stara Zagora
- Referee: Ľuboš Micheľ
- Attendance: 11,000

The 2007 Bulgarian Cup final was the final match of the 2006–07 edition of the Bulgarian Cup competition. It was the 67th consecutive Bulgarian Cup final match. The defending cup holders CSKA Sofia were eliminated at the quarter-final stage by Beroe Stara Zagora.

The match was held on 24 May 2007 at the Stadion Beroe in Stara Zagora, Bulgaria. Despite the good performance by Litex, they lost the match in the extra time when the referee award a penalty for Levski which was scored by Cédric Bardon. The win gave Levski their 25th Bulgarian Cup success.

== Match ==
=== Details ===
24 May 2007
17:00 EEST

Levski Sofia	1–0 (a.e.t.)	Litex Lovech
Bardon 111' (pen.)	Report

Stadion Beroe, Stara Zagora
Attendance: 11,000
Referee: (Slovakia) Ľuboš Micheľ

Levski Sofia	Litex Lovech

Levski:
GK	1	(Bulgaria) Georgi Petkov
RB	20	(Bulgaria) Stanislav Angelov (yellow card) 21'
CB	11	(Bulgaria) Elin Topuzakov (c)
CB	4	(Bulgaria) Igor Tomašić
LB	25	(Bulgaria) Lúcio Wagner
DM	6	(Nigeria) Richard Eromoigbe
CM	7	(Bulgaria) Daniel Borimirov (substituted off) 106'
RW	21	(Bulgaria) Dimitar Telkiyski
SS	27	(France) Cédric Bardon
LW	10	(Bulgaria) Hristo Yovov (substituted off) 82'
ST	17	(Bulgaria) Valeri Domovchiyski (substituted off) 93'
Substitutes:
GK	12	(Bulgaria) Bozhidar Mitrev
DF	5	(Bulgaria) Borislav Stoychev
MF	8	(Bulgaria) Georgi Sarmov (substituted on) 106' (yellow card) 118'
DF	14	(Bulgaria) Veselin Minev
MF	18	(Bulgaria) Miroslav Ivanov
FW	23	(Nigeria) Ekundayo Jayeoba (substituted on) 93'
FW	28	(Bulgaria) Emil Angelov (substituted on) 82' (yellow card) 93'
Coach:
(Bulgaria) Stanimir Stoilov

Litex:
GK	12	(Bulgaria) Todor Todorov
RB	2	(North Macedonia) Robert Popov (substituted off) 107'
CB	3	(Bulgaria) Zhivko Zhelev
CB	4	(Venezuela) Alejandro Cichero (yellow card) 35'
LB	29	(Bulgaria) Petar Zanev
DM	23	(Serbia) Nebojša Jelenković (c)
CM	7	(Bulgaria) Stanislav Genchev
RM	16	(Bulgaria) Stanislav Manolev (yellow card) 72'
LM	8	(Brazil) Tom
AM	10	(Brazil) Sandrinho
ST	18	(Bulgaria) Krum Bibishkov (substituted off) 63'
Substitutes:
GK	78	(Bulgaria) Yordan Gospodinov
DF	5	(Bulgaria) Mihail Venkov
DF	6	(Bulgaria) Rosen Kirilov
FW	11	(Brazil) Beto (substituted on) 63'
DF	20	(Bulgaria) Ivan Bandalovski
DF	22	(Bulgaria) Plamen Nikolov
MF	24	(Bulgaria) Petar Zlatinov (substituted on) 107'
Coach:
(Serbia) Ljupko Petrović

== See also ==
- 2006–07 A Group
