= 2022–23 Third Amateur Football League (Bulgaria) =

Third Amateur Football League
- Season: 2022–23
- Promoted: Chernomorets Balchik; Bdin Vidin; Chernomorets Burgas; Marek Dupnitsa
- Relegated: Botev Novi Pazar; Sportist General Toshevo; Volov Shumen; Borislav Parvomay; Vereya; Lokomotiv Dryanovo; Levski-Rakovski; Nadezhda Dobroslavtsi; Pirin Gotse Delchev; Granit Vladaya

The 2022–23 Third Amateur Football League season was the 73rd of the Bulgarian Third Amateur League. The group is equivalent to the third level of the Bulgarian football pyramid, comprising four divisions based on geographical areas. These divisions are the North-West, North-East, South-East, and South-West. The number of teams in each division varies, similarly to previous seasons.

== Team changes ==
To Third League

Promoted from Regional Leagues

- Boruna Tsareva Livada
- Spartak Plovdiv
- Vereya
- Sliven
- Levski-Rakovski
- Levski Sofia II
- Slavia Sofia II
- CSKA Sofia II
- CSKA 1948 III

Relegated from Second League

- Marek Dupnitsa
- Septemvri Simitli

From Third League

Promoted to Second League

- Dunav Ruse
- Krumovgrad
- Spartak Pleven
- Belasitsa Petrich
- Vitosha

Relegated to Regional Leagues

- Peshtera Galata
- Pirin Blagoevgrad II
- Hebar II
- Levski Chepintsi

== North-East Group ==
North-East Third League
- Season: 2022–23

=== Stadia and Locations ===
Locations of teams in the 2022−23 North-East Third League

Team	City	Stadium	Capacity
Botev	Novi Pazar	Gradski	8,000
Chernolomets Popovo	Popovo	Stamo Kostov Stadium	5,000
Chernomorets Balchik	Balchik	Balchik	2,600
Cherno More II	Varna	Korabostroitel	1,500
Dorostol	Silistra	Louis Eyer Stadium	12,000
Dunav Ruse II	Ruse	Gradski Stadion	13,000
Lokomotiv	Ruse	Lokomotiv Stadium	13,000
Ludogorets III	Razgrad	Eagles' Nest	2,000
Riltsi	Dobrich	Druzhba	12,500
Septemvri	Tervel	Septemvri	700
Spartak Varna II	Varna	Lokomotiv	2,000
Sportist GT	General Toshevo	Sportist	6,000
Svetkavitsa	Targovishte	Dimitar Burkov	5,000
Ustrem	Donchevo	Donchevo Stadium	1,000
Volov	Shumen	Panayot Volov Stadium	24,390

=== League table ===
Pos	Team	Pld	W	D	L	GF	GA	GD	Pts	Promotion or relegation
1	Chernomorets Balchik (C, P)	28	25	2	1	86	13	+73	77	Promotion to Second League
2	Septemvri Tervel	28	21	5	2	70	18	+52	68	
3	Svetkavitsa Targovishte	28	17	5	6	42	23	+19	56	
4	Chernolomets Popovo	28	17	4	7	68	24	+44	55	
5	Ludogorets III	28	17	3	8	79	31	+48	54	
6	Cherno More II	28	15	2	11	63	33	+30	47	
7	Riltsi Dobrich	28	13	7	8	46	43	+3	46	
8	Spartak Varna II	28	13	5	10	44	35	+9	44	
9	Dorostol Silistra	28	12	4	12	28	40	−12	40	
10	Volov Shumen	28	7	1	20	26	62	−36	22	
11	Dunav Ruse II	28	6	4	18	26	63	−37	22	
12	Ustrem Donchevo	28	6	3	19	28	67	−39	21	
13	Lokomotiv Ruse	28	5	6	17	33	56	−23	21	Possible Relegation to Regional Divisions
14	Sportist General Toshevo	28	5	3	20	31	96	−65	18	Possible Relegation to Regional Divisions
15	Botev Novi Pazar (R)	28	4	0	24	20	86	−66	12	Relegation to Regional Divisions

Source: bulgarian-football.com
Rules for classification: 1) Points; 2) Head-to-head points; 3) Head-to-head goal difference; 4) Head-to-head goals scored; 5) Head-to-head away goals scored (only if two teams); 6) Goal difference; 7) Goals scored; 8) Fairplay ranking; 9) Draw.
(C) Champions; (P) Promoted; (R) Relegated

== South-East Group ==
South-East Third League
- Season: 2022-23

=== Stadia and Locations ===
Location of teams in 2022–23 South-East Third League

Team	City	Stadium	Capacity
Asenovets	Asenovgrad	Shipka Stadium	4,000
Atletik	Kuklen	Atletik	1,000
Beroe II	Stara Zagora	Lokomotiv Stadium	10,000
Borislav	Parvomay	Gradski	8,000
Chernomorets	Burgas	Cherveno zname	3,000
Dimitrovgrad	Dimitrovgrad	Minyor	10,000
Gigant	Saedinenie	Saedinenie	5,000
Karnobat	Karnobat	Gradski	3,000
Levski	Karlovo	Vasil Levski	3,000
Lokomotiv Plovdiv II	Plovdiv	Sadovo Stadium	500
Nesebar	Nesebar	Stadion Nesebar	6,800
Rodopa	Smolyan	Septemvri Stadium	6,100
Rozova Dolina	Kazanlak	Sevtopolis	15,000
Sayana	Haskovo	Haskovo	9,000
Sliven	Sliven	Hadzhi Dimitar Stadium	10,000
Sokol	Markovo	Sokol	2,500
Spartak Plovdiv	Plovdiv	Sports Complex Eurocollege	500
Vereya	Stara Zagora	Trace Arena	3,500
FC Yambol	Yambol	Tundzha	18,000
Zagorets	Nova Zagora	Zagorets	5,900

=== League table ===
Pos	Team	Pld	W	D	L	GF	GA	GD	Pts	Promotion or relegation
1	Nesebar	38	26	5	7	84	32	+52	83	
2	Chernomorets Burgas (Note: Champions of the Southeast Third League, Nesebar, decided to cancel their promotion to the Second League due to organizational reasons. The Bulgarian Football Union invited second-placed Chernomorets Burgas to the Second League instead. Chernomorets accepted the invite and was thus promoted.)	38	24	8	6	82	26	+56	80	Promotion to Second League
3	Gigant Saedinenie	38	23	9	6	69	28	+41	78	
4	Zagorets	38	22	10	6	64	19	+45	76	
5	Sayana Haskovo	38	20	9	9	68	36	+32	69	
6	Rozova Dolina	38	20	8	10	66	29	+37	68	
7	Spartak 1947 Plovdiv	38	19	8	11	73	43	+30	65	
8	Asenovets 2005	38	19	7	12	69	41	+28	64	
9	Lokomotiv Plovdiv II	38	20	4	14	57	33	+24	64	
10	Yambol 1915	38	16	9	13	57	48	+9	57	
11	Rodopa Smolyan	38	16	7	15	51	48	+3	55	
12	Dimitrovgrad	38	16	4	18	52	54	−2	52	
13	Sokol Markovo	38	15	3	20	54	58	−4	48	
14	Levski Karlovo	38	12	6	20	45	69	−24	42	
15	Karnobat	38	11	8	19	37	57	−20	41	
16	Beroe Stara Zagora II	38	11	4	23	45	74	−29	37	Possible Relegation to Regional Divisions
17	Atletik Kuklen	38	11	3	24	37	83	−46	36	Possible Relegation to Regional Divisions
18	Sliven (Note: Although Sliven finished in the relegation zone at the end of the season, the team was spared from relegation due to Arda Kardzhali’s reserve team, Arda II, refusing promotion to the Third League. On the other hand, Mineral Ovoshtnik also refused to promote, thus Sliven was spared from relegation.)	38	10	6	22	58	93	−35	36	Relegation to Regional Divisions
19	Borislav 2009 Parvomay (R)	38	5	6	27	34	92	−58	21	Relegation to Regional Divisions
20	Vereya (R)	38	2	0	36	24	163	−139	6	Relegation to Regional Divisions

Updated to match(es) played on 14 Juny 2023. Source: bulgarian-football.com
Rules for classification: 1) Points; 2) Head-to-head points; 3) Head-to-head goal difference; 4) Head-to-head goals scored; 5) Head-to-head away goals scored (only if two teams); 6) Goal difference; 7) Goals scored; 8) Fairplay ranking; 9) Draw.
(R) Relegated

== North-West Group ==
North-West Third League
- Season: 2022-23

=== Stadia and locations ===
Location of teams in 2022–23 North-West Third League

Team	City	Stadium	Capacity
Akademik	Svishtov	Akademik	13,500
Bdin	Vidin	Georgi Benkovski	15,000
Botev II	Vratsa	Hristo Botev	25,000
Boruna	Tsareva Livada	Republikanets	815
FC Drenovets	Drenovets	Arena Drenovets	1300
Etar II	Veliko Tarnovo	Trifon Ivanov	
Juventus	Malchika	Georgi Karchev	1,000
Levski 2007	Levski	Levski	6,000
Lokomotiv	Dryanovo	Lokomotiv	3,500
Lokomotiv	Gorna Oryahovitsa	Lokomotiv	10,500
Lokomotiv	Mezdra	Lokomotiv	5,000
Partizan	Cherven Bryag	Gradski	700
Pavlikeni	Pavlikeni	Gancho Panov	10,000
Sevlievo	Sevlievo	Rakovski	5,000
Vihar	Slavyanovo	Gradski	1,000
Yantra Polski Trambesh	Polski Trambesh	Gradski	800

=== League table ===
Pos	Team	Pld	W	D	L	GF	GA	GD	Pts	Promotion or relegation
1	Bdin Vidin	30	25	1	4	89	29	+60	76	Promotion to Second League
2	Lokomotiv Gorna Oryahovitsa	30	23	3	4	90	21	+69	72	
3	Vihar Slavyanovo	32	23	3	6	63	25	+38	72	
4	Lokomotiv Mezdra	30	20	3	7	63	27	+36	63	
5	Pavlikeni	29	16	4	9	54	48	+6	52	
6	Sevlievo	30	16	3	11	65	30	+35	51	
7	Yantra Polski Trambesh	30	13	4	13	64	44	+20	43	
8	Akademik Svishtov	30	11	6	13	47	46	+1	39	
9	Partizan Cherven Bryag	30	10	3	17	36	54	−18	33	
10	Botev Vratsa II	30	9	6	15	41	64	−23	33	
11	Juventus Malchika	30	11	0	19	35	74	−39	33	
12	Drenovets	30	9	4	17	41	76	−35	31	
13	Levski 2007	29	9	1	19	30	66	−36	28	Possible Relegation to Regional Divisions
14	Etar II	30	7	4	19	38	68	−30	25	Possible Relegation to Regional Divisions
15	Boruna Tsareva Livada	30	6	5	19	33	72	−39	23	Possible Relegation to Regional Divisions
16	Lokomotiv Dryanovo	30	5	6	19	23	68	−45	21	Relegation to Regional Divisions

Updated to match(es) played on 14 Juny 2023. Source: bulgarian-football.com
Rules for classification: 1) Points; 2) Head-to-head points; 3) Head-to-head goal difference; 4) Head-to-head goals scored; 5) Head-to-head away goals scored (only if two teams); 6) Goal difference; 7) Goals scored; 8) Fairplay ranking; 9) Draw.

== South-West Group ==
South-West Third League
- Season: 2022-23

=== Stadia and locations ===
Location of teams in 2022–23 South-West Third League
Sofia 2022–23 South-West Third League football clubs

Team	City	Stadium	Capacity
Balkan	Botevgrad	Hristo Botev	8,000
Bansko	Bansko	Saint Peter	3,000
Botev	Ihtiman	Hristo Botev	5,000
Chavdar	Etropole	Chavdar	5,600
CSKA Sofia II	Sofia	Pancharevo	1,500
CSKA 1948 III	Sofia	National Sports Academy	200
Granit	Vladaya	Vladaya	
Kostinbrod 2012	Kostinbrod	Georgi Benkovski	500
Kyustendil	Kyustendil	Osogovo	10,000
Levski-Rakovski	Sofia	Rakovski	5,000
Levski Sofia II	Sofia	Georgi Asparuhov Training Complex	1,000
Marek	Dupnitsa	Bonchuk	16,000
Nadezhda	Dovroslavtsi	Dobroslavtsi	300
Oborishte	Panagyurishte	Orcho Voyvoda	3,000
Pirin 1912	Gotse Delchev	Gradski	5,000
Pirin Razlog	Razlog	Gradski	6,500
Rilski Sportist	Samokov	Iskar	7,000
Septemvri Sofia II	Sofia	German	800
Septemvri Simitli	Simitli	Struma	8,000
Slavia Sofia II	Sofia	Aleksandar Shalamanov	25,556
Slivnishki Geroy	Slivnitsa	Slivnishki Geroy	7,000
Vihren	Sandanski	Sandanski	6,000

=== League table ===
Group A

Pos	Team	Pld	W	D	L	GF	GA	GD	Pts	Promotion or relegation
1	Marek Dupnitsa	20	15	3	2	56	15	+41	48	Qualification for Promotion group
2	Chavdar Etropole	20	14	2	4	43	19	+24	44	Qualification for Promotion group
3	Balkan Botevgrad	20	13	1	6	43	28	+15	40	Qualification for Promotion group
4	Bansko	20	10	4	6	31	21	+10	34	Qualification for Promotion group
5	Slivnishki Geroy	20	9	5	6	27	31	−4	32	Qualification for Promotion group
6	Slavia Sofia II	20	9	2	9	40	41	−1	29	Qualification for Relegation group
7	CSKA 1948 III	20	6	5	9	27	32	−5	23	Qualification for Relegation group
8	Septemvri Sofia II	20	6	5	9	28	31	−3	23	Qualification for Relegation group
9	Botev Ihtiman	20	5	0	15	24	41	−17	15	Qualification for Relegation group
10	Levski-Rakovski	20	4	3	13	19	47	−28	15	Qualification for Relegation group
11	Pirin Gotse Delchev	20	4	0	16	22	54	−32	12	Qualification for Relegation group

Source: bulgarian-football.com
Rules for classification: 1) Points; 2) Head-to-head points; 3) Head-to-head goal difference; 4) Head-to-head goals scored; 5) Head-to-head away goals scored (only if two teams); 6) Goal difference; 7) Goals scored; 8) Fairplay ranking; 9) Draw.

Group B

Pos	Team	Pld	W	D	L	GF	GA	GD	Pts	Promotion or relegation
1	Vihren Sandanski	20	13	5	2	40	20	+20	44	Qualification for Promotion group
2	Kostinbrod	20	14	2	4	31	15	+16	44	Qualification for Promotion group
3	Kyustendil	20	12	7	1	41	12	+29	43	Qualification for Promotion group
4	CSKA Sofia II	20	8	5	7	37	20	+17	29	Qualification for Promotion group
5	Septemvri Simitli	20	7	7	6	28	24	+4	28	Qualification for Promotion group
6	Rilski Sportist	20	7	6	7	33	29	+4	27	Qualification for Relegation group
7	Oborishte	20	8	3	9	20	30	−10	27	Qualification for Relegation group
8	Levski Sofia II	20	7	5	8	29	27	+2	26	Qualification for Relegation group
9	Pirin Razlog	20	4	4	12	20	38	−18	16	Qualification for Relegation group
10	Granit Vladaya	20	3	5	12	14	39	−25	14	Qualification for Relegation group
11	Nadezhda Dobroslavtsi	20	0	5	15	16	55	−39	5	Qualification for Relegation group

Source: bulgarian-football.com
Rules for classification: 1) Points; 2) Head-to-head points; 3) Head-to-head goal difference; 4) Head-to-head goals scored; 5) Head-to-head away goals scored (only if two teams); 6) Goal difference; 7) Goals scored; 8) Fairplay ranking; 9) Draw.
