= Rodopa =

Rodopa may refer to:

- Rhodope Mountains, in Bulgaria
- FC Rodopa Smolyan, Bulgarian football club
