= 2002–03 B Group =

Season of the Bulgarian B Football Group

Bulgarian B Group
- Season: 2002–03
- Champions: Rodopa Smolyan
- Promoted: Rodopa Smolyan, Makedonska Slava, Vidima-Rakovski, Belasitsa Petrich
- Relegated: Yantra Gabrovo, Olimpik Teteven, Dunav Ruse, Botev Vratsa
- Matches: 240
- Goals: 694 (2.89 per match)

The 2002–03 B Group was the 47th season of the Bulgarian B Football Group, the second tier of the Bulgarian football league system. A total of 16 teams contested the league.

== League table ==
Pos	Team	Pld	W	D	L	GF	GA	GD	Pts	Promotion or relegation
1	Rodopa Smolyan (P)	30	22	4	4	75	26	+49	70	Promotion to 2003–04 A Group
2	Makedonska slava (P)	30	21	6	3	65	19	+46	69	Promotion to 2003–04 A Group
3	Vidima-Rakovski (P)	30	18	6	6	60	24	+36	60	Promotion to 2003–04 A Group
4	Belasitsa Petrich (P)	30	17	7	6	60	32	+28	58	Qualification for Promotion play-off
5	Pirin Blagoevgrad	30	17	7	6	56	32	+24	58	Qualification for Promotion play-off
6	Svetkavitsa Targovishte	30	17	5	8	45	36	+9	56	
7	Beroe Stara Zagora	30	13	9	8	36	30	+6	48	
8	Sokol Markovo	30	11	7	12	39	44	−5	40	
9	Yantra Gabrovo (Note: Yantra Gabrovo were relegated to V Group due to a lack of finances.) (R)	30	11	7	12	42	53	−11	40	Relegation to 2003–04 V Group
10	Olimpik Teteven (Note: Olimpik Teteven were relegated to V Group due to a lack of finances.) (R)	30	11	5	14	47	54	−7	38	Relegation to 2003–04 V Group
11	Akademik Svishtov	30	8	9	13	34	38	−4	33	
12	Belite orli Pleven	30	8	4	18	29	51	−22	28	
13	Conegliano German	30	7	6	17	41	61	−20	27	
14	Spartak Pleven	30	7	5	18	32	57	−25	26	
15	Dunav Ruse (Note: Dunav Ruse were docked three points for failing to show in round 26.) (R)	30	4	6	20	19	56	−37	15	Relegation to 2003–04 V Group
x	Botev Vratsa (Note: Botev Vratsa were excluded after eight matches and demoted to their regional third level league (Southeastern V Group) for failing to show for the first two matches after the winter break, they had 3 points deducted for failing to show up at the first match and their results were annulled.) (D)	30	1	1	28	14	81	−67	1	Excluded from the league

Source: rsssf.com
Rules for classification: 1) points; 2) goal difference; 3) number of goals scored.
(D) Disqualified; (P) Promoted; (R) Relegated

== Promotion play-off ==
4 June 2003

Belasitsa Petrich	4–1	Pirin Blagoevgrad
Radojičić 20'; Aldev 24'; Dimitrov 65'; Deyanov 90+5'		Bizhev 90+1'

Lokomotiv, Sofia
Attendance: 4,500
