= 1999 Lunar New Year Cup =

Tournament details
- Host country: Hong Kong
- Dates: 1–4 February
- Teams: 4
- Venue: 1 (in 1 host city)

Final positions
- Champions: Mexico (1st title)

Tournament statistics
- Matches played: 4
- Goals scored: 10 (2.5 per match)
- Top scorer: (Bulgaria) Hristo Yovov

The 1999 Lunar New Year Cup (also known as Carlsberg Cup) was a football tournament held in Hong Kong over the first and fourth day of the Chinese New Year holiday (1 February and 4 February 1999).

== Participating teams ==
- Bulgaria
- Hong Kong League XI (host)
- Mexico
- Egypt

== Results ==
All times given in Hong Kong Time (UTC+8).

=== Semifinals ===
1 February 1999

Egypt	3–1	Bulgaria
Hassan 11', 31'; Emam 81'		Yovov 80'

Hong Kong Stadium, Hong Kong
1 February 1999

Hong Kong League XI	0–0	Mexico
Penalties
	3–4

Hong Kong Stadium, Hong Kong

=== Third place match ===
4 February 1999

Hong Kong League XI	0–3	Bulgaria
		Stoitchkov 5'; Yovov 23', 52'

Hong Kong Stadium, Hong Kong

=== Final ===
4 February 1999
20:15

Mexico	3–0	Egypt
Márquez 34'; Abundis 43'; Hernández 88' (pen.)

Hong Kong Stadium, Hong Kong

== Bracket ==
Semi-finals
1 February 1999 – Hong Kong
Egypt	3
Bulgaria	1
1 February 1999 – Hong Kong
Hong Kong League XI (pen.)	0 (3)
Mexico	0 (4)

Final
4 February 1999 – Hong Kong
Mexico	3
Egypt	0
Third place
4 February 1999 – Hong Kong
Hong Kong League XI	0
Bulgaria	3

1999 Carlsberg Cup Winner
Mexico
First Title

== Scorers ==
3 goals

- (Bulgaria) Hristo Yovov

2 goals

- (Egypt) Hossam Hassan

1 goal

- (Mexico) Luis Hernández
- (Mexico) Jose Abundis
- (Mexico) Rafael Márquez
- (Bulgaria) Hristo Stoichkov
- (Egypt) Hazem Imam

== See also ==
- Hong Kong Football Association
- Hong Kong First Division League
