= Milan Koprivarov =

Bulgarian footballer (born 1983)

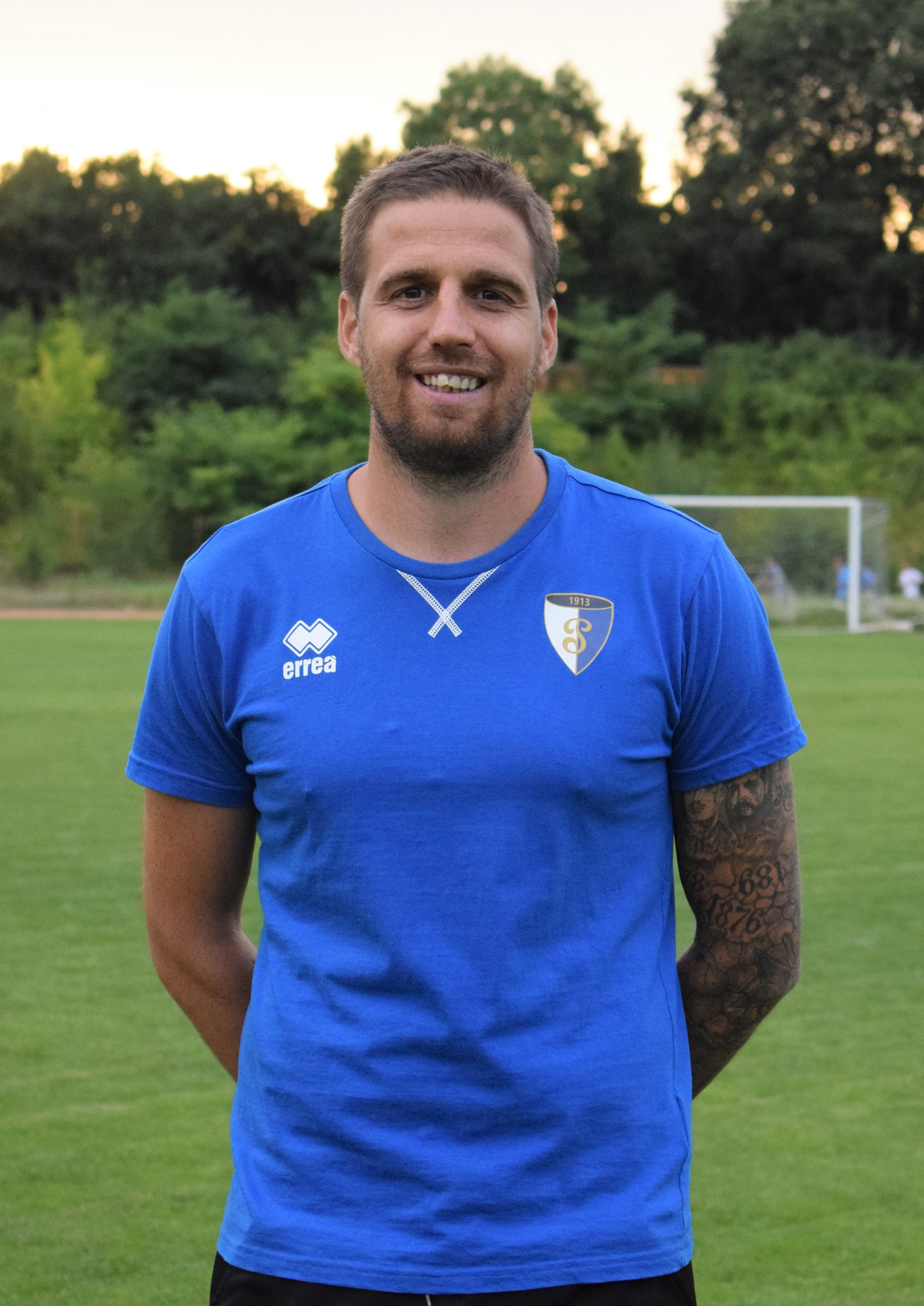

Personal information
- Full name: Milan Dimchov Koprivarov
- Date of birth: 20 July 1983 (age 43)
- Place of birth: Ihtiman, Bulgaria
- Height: 1.80 m (5 ft 11 in)
- Position: Attacking midfielder

Team information
- Current team: Levski-Rakovski (academy manager)

Senior career*
Years	Team	Apps	(Gls)
2003–2008	Levski Sofia	49	(12)
2003–2005	→ Rodopa Smolyan (loan)	35	(5)
2008–2010	Slavia Sofia	22	(1)
2010	→ Lokomotiv Mezdra (loan)	5	(0)
2010–2013	Wels	69	(11)
2013–2016	ATSV Stadl-Paura	31	(6)
2016–2018	SC Marchtrenk		
2018–2020	Levski-Rakovski		
Total		211	(35)

International career
2005	Bulgaria	1	(0)

Managerial career
- 2020–: Levski-Rakovski (academy)
- * Club domestic league appearances and goals

Milan Dimchov Koprivarov (Bulgarian: Милан Димчов Коприваров; born 20 July 1983) is a Bulgarian professional football manager and former player who is an academy coach for Levski-Rakovski. During his playing career, he predominantly played as an attacking midfielder.

== Club career ==
A product of the Levski Sofia youth system, Koprivarov spent some years on loans at smaller teams and impressed during his stay at Rodopa Smolyan. In 2005, new Levski Sofia manager Stanimir Stoilov announced that he would rely more on youngsters from the club, bringing Koprivarov back. Koprivarov soon became among the top players of the team and was eventually called up to the Bulgaria national team. He scored the winning goal for Levski against Auxerre in the 2005–06 UEFA Cup first round, helping Levski knock out the French Cup holders.

On 8 January 2008, Koprivarov joined by Slavia Sofia. He made his debut for the club on 19 January in a friendly match at home against Chavdar Etropole, which Slavia lost 1–0, with Koprivarov substituted off at half-time. He made his official debut for Slavia on 1 March in a 2–2 draw against Beroe Stara Zagora. He played the full match and scored his first goal for Slavia in the 90th minute.

== International career ==
Koprivarov made his debut for Bulgaria on 17 August 2005 in a 3–1 home victory over Turkey in a friendly match.

== Honours ==
Levski Sofia

- A Group: 2005–06, 2006–07
- Bulgarian Cup: 2004–05, 2006–07
- Bulgarian Supercup: 2005, 2007
