= FC Levski-Rakovski Sofia =

Levski-Rakovski
- Full name: Футболен Клуб "Левски-Раковски" София; Football Club Levski-Rakovski Sofia
- Nickname: Небесносините (The Sky-Blues)
- Founded: 1 August 2017; 8 years ago
- Ground: Stadion Rakovski, Sofia
- Capacity: 5,000
- Chairman: Stanislav Angelov
- Manager: Milan Koprivarov
- League: A RFG Sofia Capital South
- 2022–23: Third League, 19th (relegated)
- Website: https://levskirakovski.bg/
Home colours	Away colours

Levski-Rakovski (Bulgarian: Левски-Раковски) is a Bulgarian association football club based in Sofia, which competes in the A RFG Sofa Capital South, the forth division of the Bulgarian football league system. Levski-Rakovski's home ground is the Rakovski Stadium in Sofia, which has a capacity of 5,000 spectators.

== History ==
Levski-Rakovski began its history as a supporting youth academy for Levski Sofia. In 2017 Stanislav Angelov was announced as the new director of the academy.

=== 2017–present: Stanislav Angelov takeover ===
In August 2017, Krasimir Ivanov, CEO of Levski Sofia, announced that Levski-Rakovski Academy is no longer part of Levski. In an open letter from parents of kids that train in the academy, it was announced that Levski-Rakovski will start as an individual team, since there was no support from Levski Sofia management. For the 2019–20 season the team joined Bulgarian A Regional Group. In 2021 the reconstruction of Rakovski Stadium was finished with Hristo Stoichkov being at the opening.

The team won its promotion to Third League in 2022. In July 2022 Angelov announced that a second team will be introduced with Levski-Rakovski II joining the A RFG Sofia with Radi Georgiev becoming the manager, while Angelov becomes head coach of the first team.

== Honours ==
A RFG Sofa Capital South:

- Winners (2): 2020–21, 2021–22

== Players ==
=== Current squad ===
As of 30 August 2022

Note: Flags indicate national team as defined under FIFA eligibility rules; some limited exceptions apply. Players may hold more than one non-FIFA nationality.

No.	Pos.	Nation	Player
1	GK	BUL	Hristo Petkov
2	DF	BUL	Stoyan El Hadj Gose
3	DF	BUL	Martin Mlechkov
4	DF	BUL	Kaloyan Genchev
5	MF	BUL	Daniel Kolev
6	DF	BUL	Delyan Ivanov
7	FW	BUL	Aleksandar Valchev
8	MF	BUL	Pavel Pavlov (captain)
9	FW	BUL	Mario Georgiev
10	FW	BUL	Boris Yordanov
11	DF	BUL	Radoslav Stoimenov

No.	Pos.	Nation	Player
12	MF	BUL	Martin Zimbilev
14	FW	BUL	Nikolay Nikolov
15	DF	BUL	Alex Tenev
16	FW	BUL	Velislav Kyorov
17	MF	BUL	Ivan Rangelov
20	DF	BUL	Viktor Stoykov
21	MF	GRE	Michalis Almpanis
25	MF	BUL	Vasil Tsankov
27	MF	BUL	Georgi Brezovski
30	MF	BUL	Kaloyan Hadzhiyski
72	GK	BUL	Ivaylo Nedelchev

=== Out on loan ===
Note: Flags indicate national team as defined under FIFA eligibility rules; some limited exceptions apply. Players may hold more than one non-FIFA nationality.

No.	Pos.	Nation	Player

== Personnel ==
=== Managerial history ===
Dates	Name	Honours
2019–2022	(Bulgaria) Radi Georgiev	
2022–	(Bulgaria) Stanislav Angelov	

=== Current technical body ===
Position	Name	Nationality
Head coach	Stanislav Angelov	(Bulgaria)
Assistant coach	Milan Koprivarov	(Bulgaria)

== Seasons ==
=== Season statistics ===
Season	League	Place	W	D	L	GF	GA	Pts	Bulgarian Cup
2019–20	A RFG Sofa Capital South (IV)	6th	8	0	6	33	19	24	Did not qualify
2020–21	A RFG Sofa Capital South	1st	19	3	0	115	14	60	Did not qualify
2021–22	A RFG Sofa Capital South	1st	24	0	2	123	21	72	Did not qualify
2022–23	Third League (III)	—	—	—	—	—	—	—	Preliminary round
Green marks a season followed by promotion, red a season followed by relegation.
