= Borislav Stoychev =

Bulgarian footballer

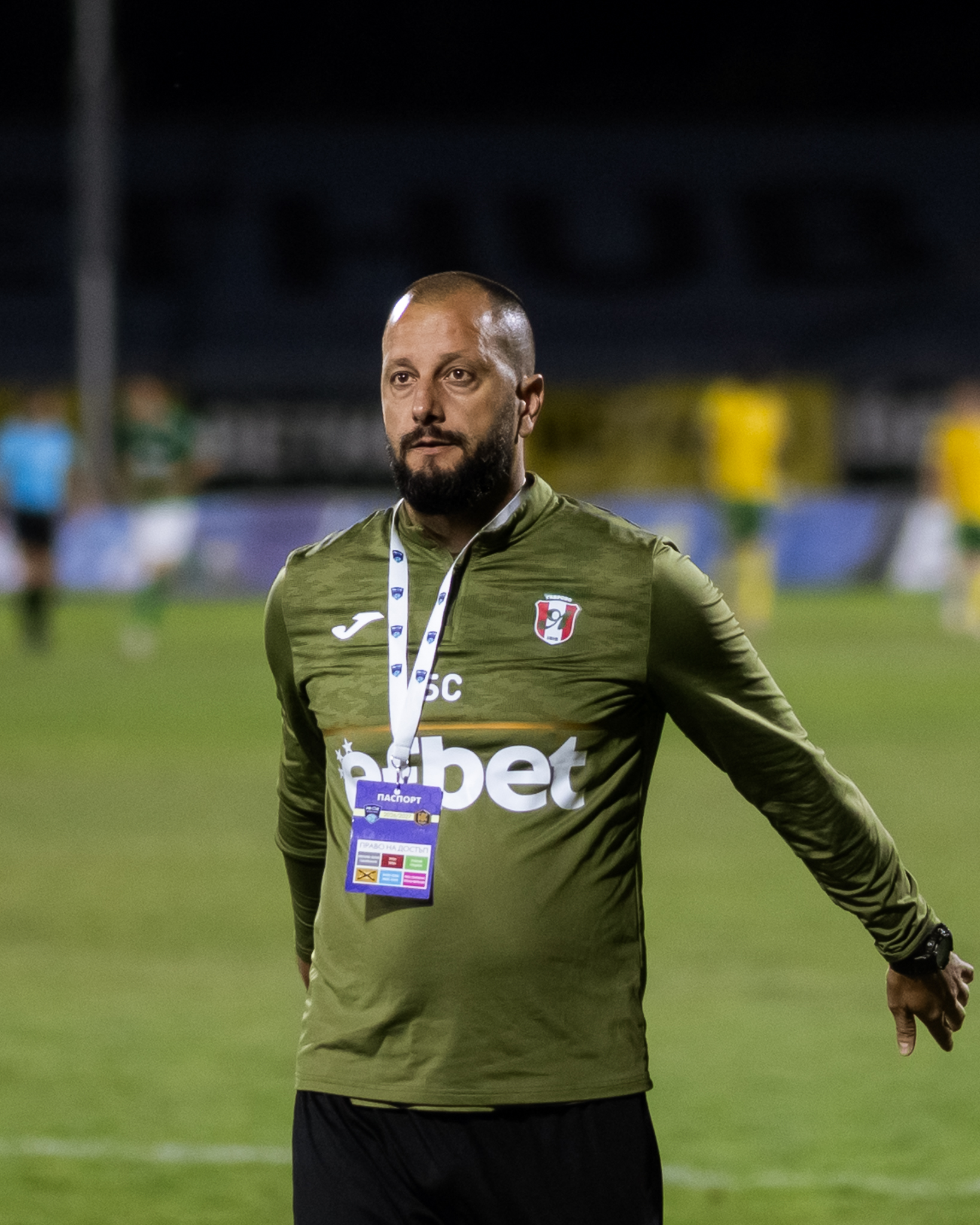

Personal information
- Full name: Borislav Stoychev Hristov
- Date of birth: 26 November 1986 (age 39)
- Place of birth: Haskovo, PR Bulgaria
- Height: 1.87 m (6 ft 1 1/2 in)
- Position: Centre-back

Team information
- Current team: Yantra Gabrovo (head coach)

Senior career*
Years	Team	Apps	(Gls)
2005–2008	Levski Sofia	10	(2)
2007–2008	→ Vidima-Rakovski (loan)	19	(0)
2008–2009	Chernomorets Burgas	9	(0)
2009	→ Naftex Burgas (loan)	12	(2)
2009–2010	Sliven 2000	5	(0)
2010	Lyubimets 2007	15	(1)
2011–2012	Minyor Pernik	50	(4)
2013–2014	Beroe	41	(1)
2014–2015	Levski Sofia	30	(0)
2015–2016	Atromitos	4	(0)
2016	Cherno More	8	(0)
2016–2018	Ethnikos Achna	42	(2)
2018	Arda Kardzhali	11	(1)
2019	Montana	5	(0)
2019–2022	Sportist Svoge	66	(5)

Managerial career
- 2026–: Yantra Gabrovo
- * Club domestic league appearances and goals

Borislav Stoychev (Bulgarian: Борислав Стойчев; born 26 November 1986) is a former Bulgarian professional footballer who is the head coach of Second League club Yantra Gabrovo.

== Career ==
Borislav Stoychev has over 200 official games in First Professional Football League (Bulgaria), Super League Greece and Cypriot First Division.

=== Early career ===
Born in Haskovo, Stoychev grew up in Haskovo and played for PFC Haskovo at the age of 16. In 2005, he was chosen as an athlete of the year. In 2006, Stoychev signed a three-year contract for Levski Sofia in an undisclosed fee deal.

=== PFC Levski Sofia 2005-2007 ===
He was bought by PFC Levski Sofia in January 2006. In this period Stoychev was a Bulgaria national under-21 football team player. His debut for PFC Levski Sofia was on 12 March 2006, as a substitute against Marek, replacing Lúcio Wagner in the 75th minute.

Stoychev won two First Professional Football League (Bulgaria) titles, a Bulgarian Cup and the Bulgarian Supercup for PFC Levski Sofia.

December 2006 Spanish newspaper Marca (newspaper) publishes an article about Stoychev being listed for Real Madrid CF. According to Marca (newspaper) the 20th year old Borislav Stoychev was the best central defender in Bulgaria and he was dominating in the air game.

=== FC Minyor Pernik ===
After short period in FC Lyubimets Borislav Stoychev was bought by FC Minyor Pernik. There he had two years during which his performance got him noticed by one of the Bulgarian football coaches Petar Hubchev.

=== PFC Beroe Stara Zagora ===
November 2012 Stoychev signed for PFC Beroe Stara Zagora a three-year contract. He helped PFC Beroe Stara Zagora to win Bulgarian Cup and Bulgarian Supercup. He scored one of the decisive penalties in the Cup final against PFC Levski Sofia.

=== PFC Levski Sofia 2014/2015 ===
In 2014, after two very good years in PFC Beroe Stara Zagora, few of the leading football teams in Bulgaria are interested in Borislav Stoychev. But he chooses the proposal of PFC Levski Sofia. So he is bought by PFC Levski Sofia for second time in his career. Stoychev signes a two-year contract and during his second time in PFC Levski Sofia he plays all the championship games in the first eleven and he helps PFC Levski Sofia to reach the final for Bulgarian Cup. During this period he is called by the Bulgaria national football team for the qualification games against Malta and Italy, and two friendly games against Romania and Turkey.

=== Atromitos F.C. ===
In 2015, Atromitos F.C. attracts Borislav Stoychev to sign on a two-year contract.

=== Ethnikos Achna FC ===
In 2016, Stoychev continues his career in Cypriot First Division. There he had two very good years and he resigned the contract with them. On 23 January 2017 in a game against Doxa Katokopias FC Stoychev scored his first goal for Ethnikos Achna FC, which helped for their success. He also scored a goal for his team Ethnikos Achna FC later again against Doxa Katokopias FC.

== Honours ==
=== Club ===
Levski Sofia

- A Group (2): 2005–06, 2006–07
- Bulgarian Cup (1): 2007
- Bulgarian Supercup (1): 2007

Beroe

- Bulgarian Cup (1): 2012–13
- Bulgarian Supercup (1): 2013

== International career ==
He was called up to the Bulgaria squad by Ivaylo Petev for the UEFA Euro 2016 qualifications against Italy in March 2015 and against Malta in June 2015.

== Career statistics ==
Club

Club	Season	League		Cup (Note: Includes Bulgarian Cup, Bulgarian Supercup, Greek Cup, Cypriot Cup, 2014–15 UEFA Europa League)		Europe		Total	
Club	Season	Apps	Goals	Apps	Goals	Apps	Goals	Apps	Goals
Levski Sofia	2005–06	1	0	0	0	3	0	4	0
Levski Sofia	2006–07	9	2	1	0	—		10	2
Levski Sofia	2007-08	0	0	0	0	1	0	1	0
Vidima Rakovski (loan)	2007–08	19	0	—		—		19	0
Vidima Rakovski (loan)	Total	29	2	1	0	4	0	34	2
Chernomorets Burgas	2008–09	9	0	—		—		9	0
Naftex Burgas (loan)	2009	12	2	—		—		12	2
Sliven 2000	2009-10	5	0	—		—		5	0
Lyubimets 2007	2010	15	1	—		—		15	1
Lyubimets 2007	Total	41	3	0	0	0	0	41	3
Minyor Pernik	2011-12	50	4	2	0	—		52	4
Beroe	2013-14	43	1	9	2	2	0	54	2
Levski Sofia	2014-15	30	0	6	0	—		36	0
Levski Sofia	Total	134	5	17	2	2	0	142	6
Atromitos	2015	13	0	—		—		13	0
Cherno More	2016	8	0	—		—		8	0
Ethnikos	2016-17	31	1	2	0	0	0	33	1
Ethnikos	2017-18	15	1	—		—		15	1
Ethnikos	Total	67	2	2	0	0	0	69	2
Arda Kardzhali	2018	14	1	—		—		14	1
Montana	2019	12	0	—		—		12	0
Total		26	1	0	0	0	0	26	1
Career total		297	13	20	2	6	0	312	14
