= Georgi Bizhev =

Bulgarian footballer

Personal information
- Full name: Georgi Ventsislavov Bizhev
- Date of birth: 6 July 1981 (age 45)
- Place of birth: Blagoevgrad, Bulgaria
- Height: 1.81 m (5 ft 11 in)
- Position: Forward

Senior career*
Years	Team	Apps	(Gls)
1998–2000	Pirin Blagoevgrad	27	(4)
2000–2001	Slavia Sofia	13	(2)
2001–2002	Spartak Pleven	16	(4)
2002–2003	Pirin Blagoevgrad	26	(17)
2003	Slavia Sofia	1	(0)
2004	Makedonska slava	13	(5)
2004	Pirin Blagoevgrad	14	(5)
2005	Gomel	1	(0)
2005	Marek Dupnitsa	13	(3)
2006	Vyzas	12	(5)
2007–2008	Velbazhd Kyustendil	25	(7)
2008	ŁKS Łomża	14	(1)
2008–2009	Belasitsa Petrich	28	(5)
2009	Spartak Varna	12	(4)
2010	Sportist Svoge	6	(0)
2010–2011	Dorostol 2003	22	(4)
2011–2012	Spartak Varna	3	(1)
2012	Pirin Blagoevgrad	0	(0)
- * Club domestic league appearances and goals

Georgi Bizhev (Bulgarian: Георги Бижев; born 6 July 1981) is a Bulgarian former professional footballer who played as a forward.
