= Tsareva Livada =

Tsareva Livada Царева ливада
- Village
- Location within Bulgaria
- Coordinates: 42°56′N 25°27′E
- Country: Bulgaria
- Province: Gabrovo Province
- Municipality: Dryanovo

Population (2009)
  - Total: 789
- Time zone: UTC+2 (EET)
  - Summer (DST): UTC+3 (EEST)

Tsareva Livada (Bulgarian: Царева ливада) is a village in the municipality of Dryanovo, in Gabrovo Province, in northern central Bulgaria.
