= 2006–07 A Group =

59th completed season of top-tier football league in Bulgaria

A Group
- Season: 2006–07
- Dates: 4 August 2006 – 27 May 2007
- Champions: Levski Sofia (25th title)
- Relegated: Rilski Sportist; Rodopa; Chernomorets Burgas Sofia
- Champions League: Levski
- UEFA Cup: CSKA; Litex; Lokomotiv Sofia
- Intertoto Cup: Cherno More
- Matches: 240
- Goals: 696 (2.9 per match)
- Top goalscorer: Tsvetan Genkov (27 goals)
- Biggest home win: Litex Lovech 11–0 Chernomorets Bs Sf
- Biggest away win: Chernomorets Bs Sf 0–9 Levski Sofia
- Highest scoring: Litex Lovech 11–0 Chernomorets Bs Sf (11 goals)

The 2006–07 A Group was the 59th season of the Bulgarian A Football Group since its establishment in 1948 and the 83rd of a Bulgarian national top football division.

The league was contested by 16 teams, thirteen returning from the 2005–06 season and three promoted from the B Group. Levski Sofia won the championship scoring a record 96 goals.

== Teams ==
=== Team changes ===
Three teams were relegated at the end of the 2005–06 season: Pirin 1922 Blagoevgrad, Naftex Burgas, and FC Pirin Blagoevgrad. The latter was disqualified for financial reasons after the first two rounds.

The relegated teams were replaced by Spartak Varna and Rilski Sportist, the two regional winners of B PFG. Spartak Varna makes an immediate return to the top tier, while Rilski Sportist return after a three-year absence. A further place in the league was decided through a one match playoff, between Chernomorets Burgas Sofia and Maritsa Plovdiv, the two runners-up from the two B Groups. Chernomorets won the match 3-2 and promoted to the top tier for the very first time.

=== Stadia and locations ===
Location of teams in 2006–07 A Group
Sofia 2006–07 A Group football clubs

Team	Location	Stadium	Capacity
Belasitsa	Petrich	Tsar Samuil Stadium	9,500
Beroe	Stara Zagora	Beroe Stadium	13,512
Botev	Plovdiv	Hristo Botev Stadium	22,000
Cherno More	Varna	Ticha Stadium	8,250
Chernomorets BS	Sofia	Vasil Levski National Stadium	43,230
CSKA	Sofia	Balgarska Armiya Stadium	22,015
Levski	Sofia	Georgi Asparuhov Stadium	29,200
Litex	Lovech	Lovech Stadium	7,050
Lokomotiv	Plovdiv	Lokomotiv	13,800
Lokomotiv	Sofia	Lokomotiv Sofia	22,000
Marek	Dupnitsa	Bonchuk Stadium	16,050
Rilski Sportist	Samokov	Iskar Stadium	7,000
Rodopa	Smolyan	Septemvri Stadium	6,100
Slavia	Sofia	Ovcha Kupel Stadium	18,000
Spartak	Varna	Spartak Stadium	7,500
Vihren	Sandanski	Sandanski Stadium	6,000

== League table ==
Pos	Team	Pld	W	D	L	GF	GA	GD	Pts	Qualification or relegation
1	Levski Sofia (C)	30	24	5	1	96	13	+83	77	Qualification for Champions League second qualifying round
2	CSKA Sofia	30	23	3	4	68	13	+55	72 (Note: CSKA Sofia ahead of Lokomotiv Sofia on head-to-head record; Lokomotiv Sofia–CSKA Sofia 1–1, CSKA Sofia–Lokomotiv Sofia 4–1.)	Qualification for UEFA Cup second qualifying round
3	Lokomotiv Sofia	30	23	3	4	70	28	+42	72	Qualification for UEFA Cup second qualifying round
4	Litex Lovech	30	19	5	6	65	29	+36	62	Qualification for UEFA Cup first qualifying round
5	Slavia Sofia	30	14	7	9	47	75	−28	49	
6	Cherno More	30	14	5	11	35	29	+6	47	Qualification for Intertoto Cup second round
7	Lokomotiv Plovdiv	30	13	4	13	48	43	+5	43	
8	Belasitsa Petrich	30	11	5	14	38	43	−5	38	
9	Vihren	30	11	4	15	27	39	−12	37 (Note: Vihren ahead of Botev Plovdiv on head-to-head record; Vihren–Botev Plovdiv 1–0, Botev Plovdiv–Vihren 1–2.)	
10	Botev Plovdiv	30	11	4	15	41	45	−4	37	
11	Beroe	30	10	6	14	34	33	+1	36	
12	Marek	30	9	7	14	39	58	−19	34	
13	Spartak Varna	30	10	3	17	27	52	−25	33	
14	Rilski Sportist (R)	30	10	0	20	31	53	−22	30	Relegation to 2007–08 B Group
15	Rodopa Smolyan (R)	30	5	4	21	22	52	−30	19	Relegation to 2007–08 B Group
16	Chernomorets Burgas Sofia (Note: Chernomorets Burgas Sofia were docked three points for failing to register enough youth players.) (R)	30	0	1	29	8	127	−119	−2	Relegation to 2007–08 B Group

Source: A PFG (in Bulgarian)
Rules for classification: 1st points; 2nd head-to-head points; 3rd head-to-head goal difference; 4th head-to-head goals scored; 5th head-to-head away goals scored; 6th goal difference; 7th goals scored; 8th "sportsmanship" (R & Y cards); 9th draw
(C) Champions; (R) Relegated

== Results ==
Home \ Away	BEL	BSZ	BOT	CHM	CBS	CSK	LEV	LIT	LPL	LSO	MAR	RIL	RDP	SLA	SPV	VIH
Belasitsa Petrich		1–0	2–1	1–0	2–0	1–3	0–1	2–3	3–0	1–2	2–1	4–1	1–0	1–3	1–0	2–1
Beroe	0–0		2–0	2–1	6–0	0–1	0–0	2–1	0–5	2–2	1–1	1–0	2–1	1–2	1–0	2–0
Botev Plovdiv	3–1	1–0		2–0	5–1	1–0	2–2	1–2	3–2	1–2	3–0	1–0	2–1	1–1	5–1	1–2
Cherno More	1–0	1–0	4–0		3–1	0–2	1–1	1–0	1–0	2–3	1–0	2–1	2–1	0–1	3–0	1–2
Chernomorets Burgas Sofia	1–2	0–8	0–3	0–6		0–6	0–3 (Note: Match awarded as Chernomorets Burgas Sofia failed to register five youth players.)	0–0	0–1	0–9	1–4	0–1	1–2	0–4	0–3	0–3 (Note: Match awarded as Chernomorets Burgas Sofia failed to engage a licensed security firm for the game.)
CSKA Sofia	2–1	2–0	2–0	0–0	6–0		0–1	2–0	3–0	4–1	2–0	3–0	1–0	6–1	4–0	5–0
Levski Sofia	1–0	3–0	3–0	5–0	10–0	1–0		6–2	6–1	3–0	8–0	5–0	3–0	2–0	3–0	4–0
Litex Lovech	7–1	2–0	2–0	0–0	11–0	0–1	0–0		5–1	2–1	4–1	3–1	2–1	2–0	1–0	1–0
Lokomotiv Plovdiv	1–0	1–0	2–0	2–0	6–0	1–1	1–3	1–1		2–4	1–1	1–0	5–0	0–0	4–0	2–0
Lokomotiv Sofia	1–0	1–0	3–1	2–0	7–0	1–1	3–5	1–0	2–0		1–0	2–0	5–0	2–1	2–0	1–0
Marek	1–1	1–1	2–2	0–1	4–1	1–0	0–8	1–2	3–1	1–2		3–2	4–2	2–2	3–1	0–1
Rilski Sportist	1–2	0–1	3–1	1–2	3–1	1–3	2–1	1–3	1–3	1–3	3–0		1–0	0–1	1–0	1–0
Rodopa Smolyan	1–0	0–0	1–1	0–0	1–0	1–2	0–3	1–3	0–1	0–2	1–2	3–0		1–2	3–0	0–1
Slavia Sofia	2–1	2–1	2–0	0–0	8–0	0–1	0–3	2–2	1–0	1–1	1–0	0–1	4–1		1–1	3–1
Spartak Varna	3–3	2–1	1–0	2–0	2–1	1–3	1–2	1–3	2–1	0–1	1–0	3–1	1–0	1–0		0–0
Vihren	1–1	2–0	1–0	0–2	2–0	0–2	0–0	0–1	3–2	0–2	1–2	1–2	0–0	3–2	2–0	

Source: A PFG (in Bulgarian)
Legend: Blue = home team win; Yellow = draw; Red = away team win.

== Champions ==
Levski Sofia

Goalkeepers
1	(Bulgaria) Georgi Petkov	17	(0)
12	(Bulgaria) Bozhidar Mitrev	7	(0)
88	(Bulgaria) Nikolay Mihaylov	5	(0)

Defenders
3	(Bulgaria) Zhivko Milanov	18	(1)
4	(Bulgaria) Igor Tomašić	22	(0)
5	(Bulgaria) Borislav Stoychev	9	(2)
11	(Bulgaria) Elin Topuzakov	23	(0)
14	(Bulgaria) Veselin Minev	10	(0)
15	(Bulgaria) Simeon Ivanov	1	(0)
20	(Bulgaria) Stanislav Angelov	26	(1)
25	(Bulgaria) Lúcio Wagner	19	(1)

Midfielders
6	(Nigeria) Richard Eromoigbe	24	(1)
7	(Bulgaria) Daniel Borimirov	20	(4)
8	(Bulgaria) Georgi Sarmov	18	(2)
13	(Israel) Eli Zizov	1	(0)
16	(Bulgaria) Mariyan Ognyanov	5	(0)
18	(Bulgaria) Miroslav Ivanov	23	(5)
19	(Bulgaria) Atanas Bornosuzov	4	(0)
21	(Bulgaria) Dimitar Telkiyski	25	(8)
24	(Bulgaria) Nikolay Dimitrov	8	(3)
27	(France) Cédric Bardon	24	(8)
30	(Bulgaria) Lachezar Baltanov	2	(0)
77	(Bulgaria) Milan Koprivarov	15	(5)

Forwards
9	(Bulgaria) Georgi Ivanov*	12	(9)
10	(Bulgaria) Hristo Yovov	24	(13)
17	(Bulgaria) Valeri Domovchiyski	19	(15)
23	(Nigeria) Ekundayo Jayeoba	6	(4)
28	(Bulgaria) Emil Angelov	19	(9)

Manager
(Bulgaria) Stanimir Stoilov

- Georgi Ivanov left the club during a season.

== Top scorers ==
Rank	Scorer	Club	Goals
1	(Bulgaria) Tsvetan Genkov	Lokomotiv Sofia	27
2	(Bulgaria) Todor Kolev	Slavia Sofia	25
3	(Romania) Eugen Trică	CSKA Sofia	16
3	(Bulgaria) Enyo Krastovchev	Marek Dupnitsa	16
5	(Bulgaria) Valeri Domovchiyski	Levski Sofia	15
6	(Bulgaria) Hristo Yovov	Levski Sofia	13
7	(Bulgaria) Krum Bibishkov	Litex Lovech	12
7	(Brazil) Marquinhos	Belasitsa Petrich	12

== Attendances ==
#	Club	Average
1	Levski	7,572
2	Cherno More	4,900
3	Botev	4,580
4	Beroe	3,967
5	CSKA Sofia	3,898
6	Lokomotiv Plovdiv	3,240
7	Varna	2,300
8	Lokomotiv Sofia	2,160
9	Sportist	2,100
10	Rodopa	1,903
11	Vihren	1,727
12	Belasitsa	1,620
13	Lovech	1,527
14	Marek	1,223
15	Slavia Sofia	1,087
16	Chernomorets	531
