= 2006–07 Bulgarian Cup =

Tournament details
- Country: Bulgaria

Final positions
- Champions: Levski Sofia (25th cup)
- Runners-up: Litex Lovech

The 2006–07 Bulgarian Cup was the 67th season of the Bulgarian Cup. Levski Sofia won the competition, beating Litex Lovech 1–0 after extra time in the final at the Beroe Stadium in Stara Zagora.

== First round ==
In this round entered winners from the preliminary rounds together with the teams from B Group.

Team 1	Score	Team 2
4 October 2006
Botev Krivodol (III)	1–2 (a.e.t.)	Vihar Gorublyane (II)
Svetkavitsa (II)	0–2	Kaliakra Kavarna (II)
Dobrudzha Dobrich (II)	3–1 (a.e.t.)	Lokomotiv Stara Zagora (II)
Belite orli Pleven (II)	1–2	Hebar Pazardzhik (II)
Devnya (III)	0–3	Nesebar (II)
Vidima-Rakovski (II)	1–1 (a.e.t.) (4–5 p)	Maritsa Plovdiv (II)
Spartak Plovdiv (II)	4–0	Spartak Pleven (II)
Lokomotiv Mezdra (II)	1–5	Naftex Burgas (II)
Pirin Gotse Delchev (II)	2–3	Chavdar Byala Slatina (II)
Malesh Mikrevo (III)	1–4	Chernomorets Burgas (II)
Svilengrad (III)	1–1 (a.e.t.) (2–4 p)	Sliven 2000 (II)
Shumen (II)	2–1	Minyor Pernik (II)
Montana (II)	4–0	Haskovo (II)
Minyor Bobov Dol (II)	0–2	Minyor Radnevo (II)
Velbazhd Kyustendil (II)	2–3 (a.e.t.)	Pirin Blagoevgrad (II)
Dunav Ruse (II)	3–1 (a.e.t.)	Etar 1924 (II)

== Second round ==
This round featured winners from the First Round and all teams from A Group.

Team 1	Score	Team 2
7 November 2006
Cherno More Varna	1–0	Rodopa Smolyan
8 November 2006
Minyor Radnevo (II)	1–6	Lokomotiv Plovdiv
Chavdar Byala Slatina (II)	0–3	CSKA Sofia
Kaliakra Kavarna (II)	0–1	Lokomotiv Sofia
Vihar Gorublyane (II)	0–4	Beroe Stara Zagora
Chernomorets Burgas (II)	5–0	Dobrudzha Dobrich (II)
Maritsa Plovdiv (II)	1–2	Botev Plovdiv
Spartak Plovdiv (II)	1–2	Vihren Sandanski
Shumen (II)	0–2	Litex Lovech
Montana (II)	1–1 (a.e.t.) (3–1 p)	Spartak Varna
Rilski Sportist	2–0	Chernomorets Burgas Sofia
Nesebar (II)	0–1 (a.e.t.)	Sliven 2000 (II)
Hebar Pazardzhik (II)	1–3	Slavia Sofia
Pirin Blagoevgrad (II)	1–0	Belasitsa Petrich
Dunav Ruse (II)	3–0	Marek Dupnitsa
Naftex Burgas (II)	2–3	Levski Sofia

== Third round ==
Team 1	Score	Team 2
30 November 2006
Litex Lovech	4–0	Rilski Sportist
Dunav Ruse (II)	1–4	Lokomotiv Plovdiv
Slavia Sofia	3–1	Botev Plovdiv
Pirin Blagoevgrad (II)	2–2 (a.e.t.) (4–3 p)	Lokomotiv Sofia
Montana (II)	1–2	CSKA Sofia
Vihren Sandanski	0–0 (a.e.t.) (4–3 p)	Cherno More Varna
Sliven 2000 (II)	1–2	Beroe Stara Zagora
Chernomorets Burgas (II)	0–1 (a.e.t.)	Levski Sofia

== Quarter-finals ==
11 April 2007	Beroe Stara Zagora	1–0 (a.e.t.)	CSKA Sofia	Stara Zagora
14:30 EEST	Lopes 120'	Report		Stadium: Beroe; Attendance: 3,500; Referee: Paulo Paraty (Portugal)

11 April 2007	Pirin Blagoevgrad (II)	0–0 (a.e.t.) (2–4 p)	Levski Sofia	Blagoevgrad
16:00 EEST		Report		Stadium: Hristo Botev; Attendance: 6,500; Referee: Stoyan Aleksiev (Sofia)
	Penalties
	Dyakov (penalty scored); Metushev (penalty scored); Markov (penalty missed); Hazurov (penalty missed)		(penalty scored) Telkiyski; (penalty scored) Bardon; (penalty scored) Domovchiyski; (penalty missed) Milanov; (penalty scored) Tomašić

11 April 2007	Litex Lovech	2–1	Slavia Sofia	Lovech
16:00 EEST	Jelenković 15'; Manolev 58'		Kolev 22'	Stadium: Gradski; Attendance: 1,000

11 April 2007	Lokomotiv Plovdiv	1–0	Vihren Sandanski	Plovdiv
16:00 EEST	Dakson 26'			Stadium: Lokomotiv; Attendance: 2,000

== Semi-finals ==
9 May 2007	Litex Lovech	1–0	Beroe Stara Zagora	Lovech
17:30 EEST	Bibishkov 23'			Stadium: Gradski; Attendance: 3,000

9 May 2007	Lokomotiv Plovdiv	0–3	Levski Sofia	Plovdiv
17:30 EEST		Report	Yovov 17'; Domovchiyski 57'; Borimirov 65'	Stadium: Lokomotiv; Attendance: 10,000; Referee: Ruud Boossen (Netherlands)

== Final ==
=== Details ===
24 May 2007
17:00 EEST

Levski Sofia	1–0 (a.e.t.)	Litex Lovech
Bardon 111' (pen.)	Report

Stadion Beroe, Stara Zagora
Attendance: 11,000
Referee: (Slovakia) Ľuboš Micheľ

Levski Sofia	Litex Lovech
