= Valeri Domovchiyski =

Bulgarian professional footballer (born 1986)

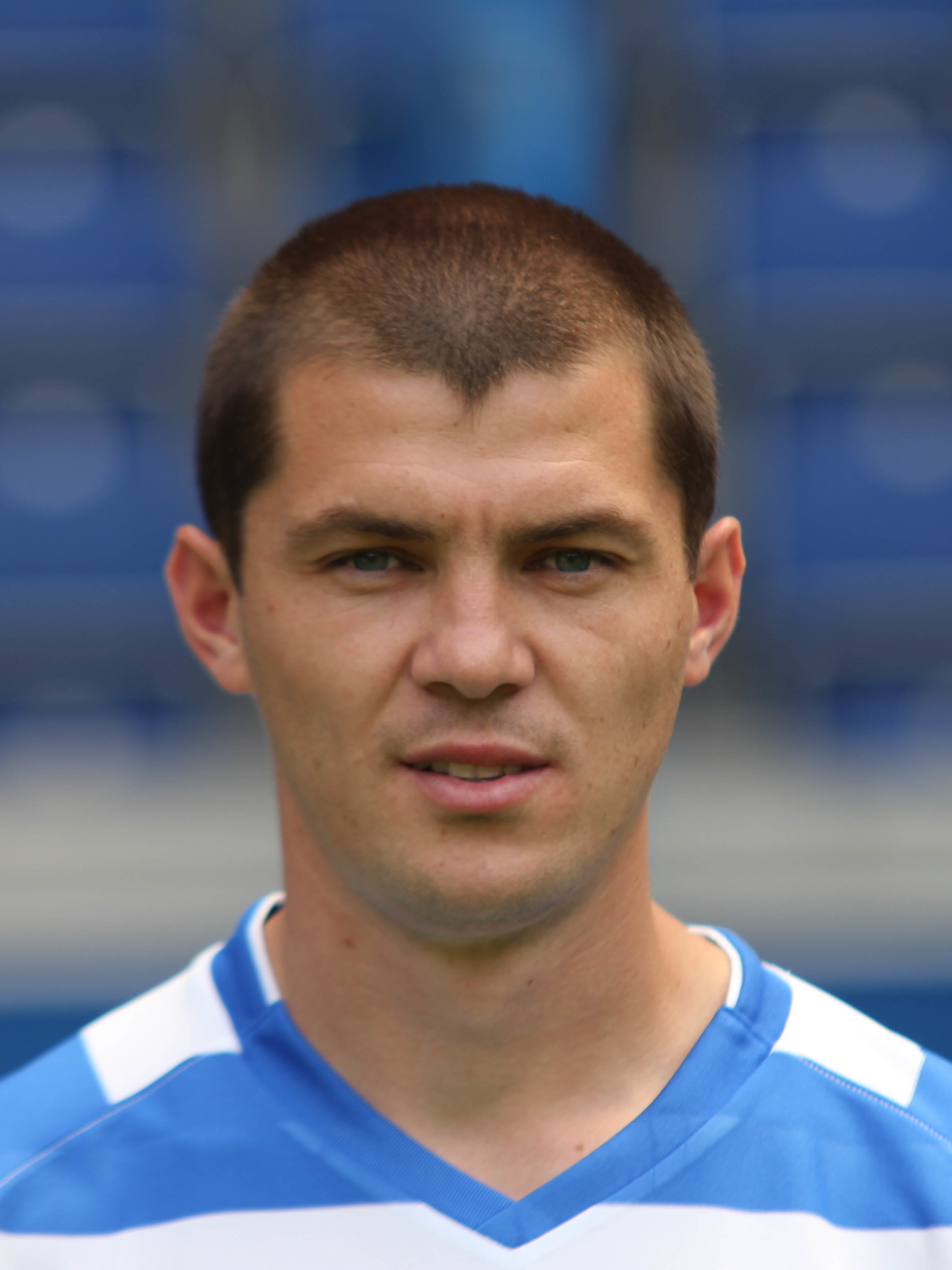
- Domovchiyski with MSV Duisburg in 2012

Personal information
- Full name: Valeri Angelov Domovchiyski
- Date of birth: 5 October 1986 (age 40)
- Place of birth: Plovdiv, Bulgaria
- Height: 1.80 m (5 ft 11 in)
- Position: Second striker

Team information
- Current team: Rakovski (player-manager)
- Number: 71

Youth career
- –2003: Sekirovo Rakovski
- 2003–2004: Maritsa Plovdiv

Senior career*
Years	Team	Apps	(Gls)
2004–2008	Levski Sofia	69	(42)
2008	→ Hertha BSC (loan)	4	(1)
2008–2011	Hertha BSC	61	(8)
2011–2013	MSV Duisburg	39	(3)
2013	Botev Plovdiv	12	(1)
2014	Cherno More	11	(3)
2014–2015	Levski Sofia	29	(10)
2015–2016	Levadiakos	11	(2)
2016	Slavia Sofia	12	(4)
2017–2018	Vereya	44	(6)
2018–2021	Botev Vratsa	81	(19)
2021–2025	Maritsa Plovdiv	124	(23)
2025–	Rakovski	16	(2)

International career
2005–2007	Bulgaria U21	15	(3)
2006–2011	Bulgaria	13	(2)

Managerial career
- 2025–: Rakovski (player-manager)
- * Club domestic league appearances and goals as of 12:17, 1 January 2026 (UTC)

Valeri Angelov Domovchiyski (Bulgarian: Валери Ангелов Домовчийски; born 5 October 1986) is a Bulgarian professional footballer who plays as a striker for Rakovski and also acts as manager.

== Career ==
=== Youth career ===
Born in Plovdiv, Domovchiyski grew up in Rakovski and played for Sekirovo Rakovski and Maritsa Plovdiv before moving to Levski Sofia.

=== Levski Sofia ===
He has played for Levski Sofia since the 2004–05 season and replaced Georgi Chilikov in the starting lineup. He scored some important goals for Levski in the European Tournaments, for example his goal against CSKA Moscow in the UEFA Cup and against Chievo in the third qualifying round of the UEFA Champions League. This goal helped Levski to become the first Bulgarian team in the group stage of the Champions League. In the European Tournaments he has played 22 games and scored four goals (nine matches and two goals for Champions League and 13 matches and two goals for UEFA Cup).

On 2 January 2008, the English Premiership team Blackburn Rovers invited Domovchiyski for a five-day trial period. On 5 January 2008, it was announced that terms had been agreed between Blackburn Rovers and Levski Sofia for the purchase of the player and that only personal terms remained for the transfer to go forward.

On 7 January 2008, Domovchiyski joined his first training session with Blackburn Rovers. The then team manager, Mark Hughes, invited the player to join the team for a five-day trial, though he had already declared himself impressed with Domovchiyski's qualities. On 11 January 2008 Blackburn Rovers invited Valeri for another week-long trial. On 21 January 2008, Blackburn had a loan deal turned down for Domovchiyski.

=== Hertha BSC ===
On 29 January 2008, Domovchiyski successfully passed his medical check-up and signed with the German Bundesliga team Hertha BSC until 30 June 2008 as a loaned player. On 17 May 2008, Domovchiyski scored his first goal for Hertha BSC against Bayern Munich. Hertha lost with 4–1, but Domovchiyski became the last player to score a goal in an official match against former keeper Oliver Kahn.

He was officially signed by Hertha on 22 May 2008. His appearances during the 2009–10 season continued to be sporadic, despite Hertha finding itself in the relegation zone. At the end of the season, Hertha finished last in the Bundesliga and were relegated. The following season, Domovchiyski failed to establish himself in Hertha's starting line-up. At the end of the 2010–11 season, he transferred to MSV Duisburg.

=== Botev Plovdiv ===
On 1 July 2013, Domovchiyski returned to Bulgaria and signed a two-year deal with Botev Plovdiv, rejoining his former manager at Levski Sofia Stanimir Stoilov. On 18 July 2013, he made his debut for Botev Plovdiv after coming on as a substitute, but was sent off on the stroke of half-time due to receiving two yellow cards in quick succession in the first leg of the UEFA Europa League match against Bosnian side Zrinjski Mostar. Three days later, Domovchiyski put in a strong performance and hit the bar in the 2–1 win over his former club Levski Sofia. On 28 July, he netted his first goal for the side from Plovdiv, opening the scoring in the 7–1 rout against PFC Pirin Gotse Delchev. Domovchiyski was mostly confined to substitute appearances during his time with the "canaries" and was released from the team in January 2014. He officially became a free agent in February.

=== Cherno More ===
In March 2014, Domovchiyski signed a contract until the end of the season with Cherno More. He scored two goals on his debut – a 4:0 away win over FC Lyubimets 2007 on 9 March.

=== Return to Levski Sofia ===
On 2 June 2014, Domovchiyski signed a two-year contract with his former club Levski Sofia. On 19 July 2014, he netted the equalizing goal in the 1:1 draw with Loko Plovdiv on his return debut for the team in an A PFG match.

=== Levadiakos ===
On 11 September 2015, Domovchiyski signed a year contract with Super League club Levadiakos. On 29 November 2015, an excellent bicycle kick by Domovchiyski at first half gave Levadiakos an important 1–0 home victory against Skoda Xanthi, after five unsuccessful results for the Super League Greece.

=== Vereya ===
In January 2017, Domovchiyski joined Vereya.

=== Botev Vratsa ===
In June 2018, he signed with Botev Vratsa.

== International career ==
=== U-21 ===
His debut for the U-21 Bulgarian national team was in March 2005 in a match against Sweden U21, in which Bulgaria was defeated by a score of 1:2. On 7 September 2005, Domovchiyski was dismissed for a second booking in the 1–3 home loss against Iceland U21, but on 12 October 2007, he scored the only goal for his side in the surprising 1–0 home win against Portugal U21.

=== Seniors ===
Domovchiyski collected his first senior international cap was on 9 May 2006 in the 2–1 win against Japan during the 2006 edition of the Kirin Cup. During 2009 he was not called often. He started being called for each match after his ex-coach Stanimir Stoilov became a head coach of Bulgarian national team. On 5 September 2009, he scored his first international goal in a World Cup qualifier against Montenegro. On 13 November 2010, he caused controversy when he refused a call-up for the friendly match against Serbia to be held four days later, citing important club commitments, which prompted coach Lothar Matthäus to permanently drop him from the national side. Domovchiyski was recalled to the national team in October 2011, following the appointment of Mikhail Madanski as caretaker manager of the Bulgarian national side.

Domovchiyski: International Goals
#	Date	Venue	Opponent	Score	Result	Competition
1.	5 September 2009	Vasil Levski, Sofia	Montenegro	4–1	4–1	World Cup 2010 Qual.
2.	12 October 2010	Atatürk Olympic Stadium, Istanbul, Turkey	Saudi Arabia	2–0	2–0	Friendly match

== Career statistics ==
=== Club ===
Club performance			League		Cup		Continental		Other (Note: Bulgarian Supercup)		Total	
Club	League	Season	Apps	Goals	Apps	Goals	Apps	Goals	Apps	Goals	Apps	Goals
Levski Sofia	A Group	2004–05	13	9	5	4	0	0	–		18	13
Levski Sofia	A Group	2005–06	24	11	2	0	13	2	1	0	40	13
Levski Sofia	A Group	2006–07	19	15	5	3	7	2	1	0	32	20
Levski Sofia	A Group	2007–08	13	7	2	0	2	0	1	0	18	7
Levski Sofia	Total		69	42	14	7	22	4	3	0	108	53
Hertha BSC	Bundesliga	2007–08	4	1	0	0	–		–		4	1
Hertha BSC	Bundesliga	2008–09	25	3	1	0	7	0	–		33	3
Hertha BSC	Bundesliga	2009–10	16	0	2	2	7	3	–		25	5
Hertha BSC	2. Bundesliga	2010–11	20	5	2	0	–		–		22	5
Hertha BSC	Total		65	9	5	2	14	3	0	0	84	14
MSV Duisburg	2. Bundesliga	2011–12	26	2	1	1	–		–		27	3
MSV Duisburg	2. Bundesliga	2012–13	13	1	0	0	–		–		13	1
MSV Duisburg	Total		39	3	1	1	0	0	0	0	40	4
Career statistics			525	118	56	16	50	6	631	140		

== Personal ==
Domovchiyski is a member of the Roman Catholic community in Bulgaria.

== Honours ==
Levski Sofia

- Bulgarian League (2): 2005–06, 2006–07
- Bulgarian Cup (2): 2004–05, 2006–07
- Bulgarian Supercup (2): 2005, 2007

Hertha

- 2. Bundesliga: 2010–11
