= Cédric Bardon =

French footballer (born 1976)

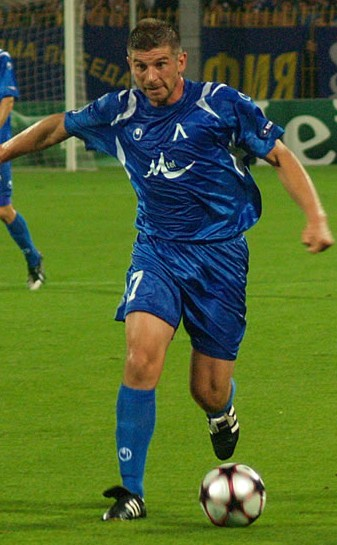
- Bardon playing for Levski Sofia in 2009

Personal information
- Full name: Cédric Daniel Franck Bardon
- Date of birth: 15 October 1976 (age 50)
- Place of birth: Lyon, France
- Height: 1.77 m (5 ft 10 in)
- Position: Forward

Youth career
- 1986–1991: Lyon

Senior career*
Years	Team	Apps	(Gls)
1992–1998	Lyon	82	(12)
1998–2001	Rennes	64	(12)
2001–2005	Guingamp	70	(12)
2005	Le Havre	5	(0)
2005–2007	Levski Sofia	57	(18)
2008	Bnei Yehuda	17	(3)
2008–2009	Anorthosis Famagusta	22	(7)
2009–2010	Levski Sofia	24	(6)
2010–2011	Étoile Fréjus Saint-Raphaël	20	(1)
Total		361	(71)

International career
1997	France U21	4	(1)
- * Club domestic league appearances and goals

Cédric Daniel Franck Bardon (born 15 October 1976) is a French former professional footballer who played as a forward.

== Career ==
=== In France ===
Bardon began his career at the local Lyon in 1992–93. He stayed in the team after 1997–98, having proven himself as an established player. Bardon played for Rennes between 1998–99 and 2000–01. He also had a trial with Premier League side Sunderland in August 2000 and played three pre-season matches for Sunderland against Fortuna Sittard, ASV Apeldoornse Boys and SC Heerenveen respectively. Bardon then moved to Guingamp to remain there until January 2004, when he was transferred to Le Havre.

=== Levski Sofia – first spell ===
Bardon was then signed by Bulgarian team Levski Sofia, after a scramble of interesting events. First, he arrived late in the transfer period and having not played for his former club in the previous months, being out of shape. Levski set up a friendly match against the team of Sliven only to have Bardon tried out. Many powerful figures for Levski came to the friendly, most notably Nasko Sirakov and then-owner Todor Batkov. Later it would become clear that they came to watch for Bardon's performance and decide whether to sign him on the spot. Bardon was decided upon after the first half of the match and was offered a contract with Levski. With the team, he played in the UEFA Cup 2005-06, notably scoring a goal against Auxerre in Levski's 2–1 loss and being controversially sent off by referee Mike Riley in the first leg against Schalke 04 in the quarter-finals. With Levski Sofia he reached 1/4 finals of UEFA Cup in 2005–06. Next season, Levski Sofia with Bardon, reached the group-stage of UEFA Champions League, becoming the first Bulgarian team that reached the groups.

=== Bnei Yehuda Tel Aviv ===
On 14 January 2008, Bardon signed for the Israeli team, Bnei Yehuda Tel Aviv He scored two goals for his debut on 26 January 2008 against F.C. Ashdod and Bnei Yehuda Tel Aviv went on to win the match 3–2.

=== Anorthosis Famagusta ===
After the 2007–08 season Bardon was transferred to Cypriot champion Anorthosis Famagusta, which paid US$200,000 for him. With Anorthosis, Bardon played in the Champions League, the first time for a Cypriot team.

In the group stage, they earned their first point following a 0–0 away draw with Werder Bremen, then got their first win beating Panathinaikos 3–1 while Hawar Mulla Mohammed became the first Iraqi player to score in the UEFA Champions League, although they lost to Inter Milan 1–0 at San Siro, they drew 3–3 in GSP Stadium.

In their fifth Champions League game, Anorthosis had a chance to make it to the knock-out stage if they would have won against Werder Bremen. Anorthosis went up 2–0, but in the second half Diego made the score 2–1, and minutes before the match ended, Hugo Almeida managed to equalise for Bremen, and the match finished 2–2. Anorthosis still had a chance to get into the knock-out stage in the final match against Panathinaikos if they won. However, in the last game they lost 1–0 away to Panathinaikos. Inter (who had already qualified for the next stage) lost 1–0 to Bremen, meaning that Anorthosis finished fourth – missing out on a consolation UEFA Cup place.

=== Levski Sofia – second spell ===
On 2 July 2009, it was announced that Bardon would return to Levski Sofia in a week. He arrived in Bulgaria the next day, to join PFC Levski Sofia for a second time. In the airport, Bardon was wearing Levski Sofia's kit. A few hours later, he signed a two-year contract with the Blues.

Bardon started his second spell at Levski on 15 July 2009 in the second Qualifying round of the UEFA Champions League, where Levski beat UE Sant Julià of Andorra. The result of the match was a 4–0 home win for Levski.

In the next round, Levski Sofia faced FK Baku. The blues eliminated the team from Azerbaijan 2–0 (on aggregate). In the play-off round Levski was eliminated by Debreceni VSC with 4–1 (on aggregate). However, Levski qualified for the UEFA Europa League.

In the 2009/2010 season, despite a couple of bad games and results, Levski qualified for the UEFA Europa League after finishing third in the final ranking.

On 4 June 2010, it was decided that Bardon was to be released by Levski Sofia.

=== Étoile Fréjus Saint-Raphaël ===
After Bardon was officially released from Levski, on 10 June 2010 he signed a one-year contract with French Championnat National club Étoile Fréjus Saint-Raphaël.

== Career statistics ==
Appearances and goals by club, season and competition
Club	Season	League			National cup (Note: Includes Coupe de France)		League cup (Note: Includes Coupe de la Ligue)		Continental		Total	
Club	Season	Division	Apps	Goals	Apps	Goals	Apps	Goals	Apps	Goals	Apps	Goals
Lyon	1992–93	Division 1	0	0	0	0	0	0	0	0	0	0
Lyon	1994–95	Division 1	12	2	0	0	0	0	0	0	12	2
Lyon	1995–96	Division 1	18	1	1	0	4	0	4 (Note: Appearances in UEFA Cup)	0	27	1
Lyon	1996–97	Division 1	28	6	2	1	2	0	0	0	32	7
Lyon	1997–98	Division 1	24	3	5	1	1	0	10 (Note: Seven appearances in UEFA Intertoto Cup; three appearances, one goal in UEFA Cup)	1	40	5
Lyon	Total		82	12	8	2	7	0	14	1	111	15
Rennes	1998–99	Division 1	31	8	2	0	2	1	0	0	35	9
Rennes	1999–2000	Division 1	27	4	2	1	1	0	2 (Note: Appearances in UEFA Intertoto Cup)	0	32	5
Rennes	2000–01	Division 1	6	0	1	0	0	0	0	0	7	0
Rennes	Total		64	12	5	1	3	1	2	0	74	14
Guingamp	2001–02	Division 1	29	8	2	1	1	1	0	0	32	11
Guingamp	2002–03	Ligue 1	34	4	2	0	1	1	0	0	37	5
Guingamp	2003–04	Ligue 1	7	0	0	0	0	0	0	0	7	0
Guingamp	2004–05	Ligue 2	3	0	0	0	0	0	0	0	3	0
Guingamp	Total		63	12	4	1	2	2	0	0	69	15
Le Havre	2004–05	Ligue 2	15	2	0	0	0	0	–		15	2
Le Havre	2005–06	Ligue 2	5	0	0	0	0	0	–		5	0
Le Havre	Total		20	2	0	0	0	0	0	0	20	2
Levski Sofia	2005–06		32	8			–		10	1		
Levski Sofia	2006–07		39	11			–		4 (Note: Appearances in UEFA Champions League qualification)	2		
Levski Sofia	2007–08		16	3			–		8 (Note: Four appearances in UEFA Champions League qualification; six appearances in UEFA Champions League)	0		
Levski Sofia	Total								22	3		
Bnei Yehuda	2007–08		17	3								
Anorthosis Famagusta	2008–09		22	7			–		11 (Note: Six appearances in UEFA Champions League qualification; five appearances, one goal in UEFA Champions League)	1		
Levski Sofia	2009–10		36	7			–		6 (Note: Five appearances, one goal in UEFA Champions League qualification; six appearances in the UEFA Cup)	0		
Étoile Fréjus Saint-Raphaël	2010–11		20	1	1	0						
Career total												

== Honours ==
Lyon

- UEFA Intertoto Cup: 1997

Levski Sofia

- Bulgarian A Professional Football Group: 2005–06, 2006–07
- Bulgarian Cup: 2006–07
- Bulgarian Super Cup: 2005, 2007, 2009
