= Hristo Yovov =

Bulgarian footballer

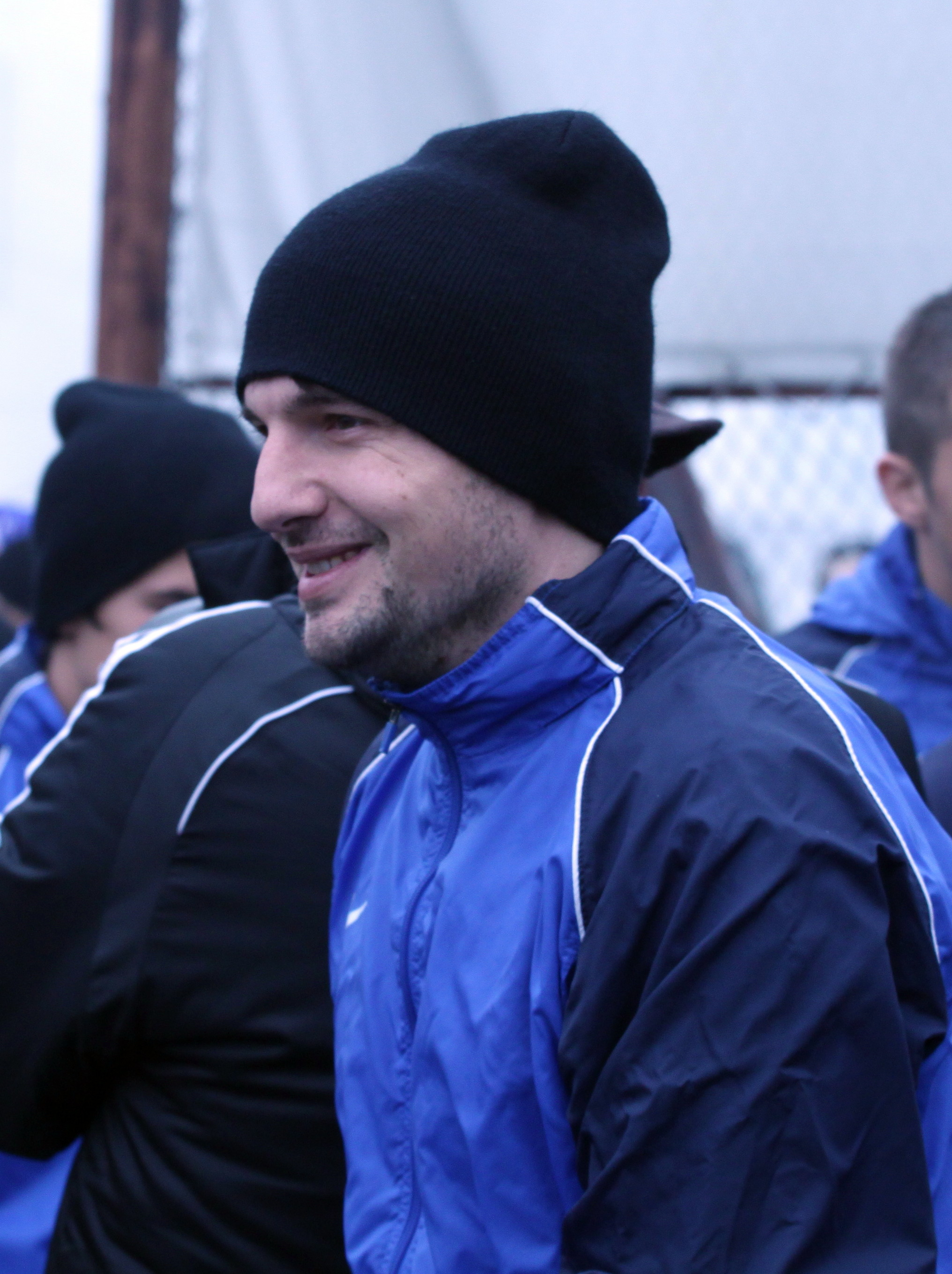

Personal information
- Full name: Hristo Georgiev Yovov
- Date of birth: 4 November 1977 (age 49)
- Place of birth: Svoge, Bulgaria
- Height: 1.82 m (6 ft 0 in)
- Position: Attacking midfielder

Senior career*
Years	Team	Apps	(Gls)
1995–1997	Levski Sofia	56	(19)
1998–1999	1860 Munich	9	(1)
1999	→ Lokomotiv Sofia (loan)	12	(6)
2000–2004	Litex Lovech	96	(47)
2004–2007	Levski Sofia	63	(22)
2008	Aris Limassol	14	(1)
2008	Apollon Limassol	7	(2)
2009–2013	Levski Sofia	96	(32)
Total		353	(130)

International career
1998–2007	Bulgaria	29	(5)

Managerial career
- 2012–2013: Levski Sofia (assistant)
- 2013: Levski Sofia (sports-technical director)
- * Club domestic league appearances and goals

Hristo Georgiev Yovov (Bulgarian: Христо Георгиев Йовов; born 4 November 1977) is a Bulgarian former professional footballer who played as an attacking midfielder. He spent all of his club career in his native Bulgaria with the exception of his three shorter stays abroad with German club 1860 Munich and Cypriot sides Aris Limassol and Apollon Limassol. He made 29 appearances scoring 5 goals for the Bulgaria national team between 1998 and 2007.

Yovov started his career with Levski Sofia. In 1998, he moved to Bundesliga club 1860 Munich. After playing little in one season and a half, he returned to Bulgaria joining Lokomotiv Sofia on loan for the second half of the 1998–99 season. He signed with Litex Lovech where he scored 47 goals in 96 matches over four-and-a-half seasons. Halfway through the 2004–05 season he began a second, three-year stint at Levski Sofia. He spent the second half of the 2007–08 season and the first half of the 2008–09 seasons in Cyprus, with Aris Limassol and Apollon Limassol. In 2009 he returned to Levski Sofia once more playing three-and-a-half seasons before retiring in summer 2013.

== Career ==
=== Early career ===
During the 1994–95 season, before his 18th birthday, Yovov made his senior debut for Levski Sofia. His first match for Levski in European tournament competitions was on 22 August 1995, in the 1–1 draw (after extra time) against Romanian team Dinamo București in a UEFA Cup match. He scored 19 goals in 56 matches, before he moved to 1860 Munich in January 1998. Yovov spent most of his time with the German side on the substitutes' bench, making for the year only nine Bundesliga appearances in the 1997–98 season. He made his debut in a 3–0 defeat to Hansa Rostock on 31 January 1998, coming on as a 59th-minute substitute for Horst Heldt and scored his first – and only – goal for 1860 in a 5–1 away win over 1. FC Nürnberg on 3 October 1998.

In January 1999, Yovov joined Lokomotiv Sofia on loan and quickly became part of the main team. He made his league debut for Lokomotiv against Litex Lovech on 26 February 1999, in a 1–0 home win. He scored his first competitive goal in a Lokomotiv shirt against Minyor Pernik on 6 March in a 5–1 away win.

=== Litex Lovech ===
In January 2000, Yovov joined Litex Lovech. On 4 March, he made his league debut in a 4–1 home win against Dobrudzha Dobrich. Two weeks later, Yovov scored his first goal for Litex in a 1–1 draw against Pirin Blagoevgrad. He scored 9 goals in 12 games for Litex in his first season.

In the following 2000–01 season, Yovov formed an impressive partnership with Zoran Janković, contributing 20 goals in all competitions. Litex won the Bulgarian Cup, with he scoring three goals in the tournament.

On 15 August 2002, Yovov scored his first-ever UEFA Cup goals, scoring twice in a 5–0 home win over Atlantas in their qualifying round first leg tie.

=== Levski Sofia ===
On 2 December 2005, Yovov scored a brilliant winning goal in a 1–0 home win over Marseille, after which he was called "The Jeweler" by fans and journalists. With Levski, he reached quarter-finals of UEFA Cup in 2005–06. The next season, Levski reached the group-stage of UEFA Champions League, becoming the first Bulgarian team to do so.

=== Aris Limassol ===
On 4 January 2008, Yovov joined Cypriot club Aris Limassol for a transfer fee of around €100,000. He was transferred because he no longer featured in the coach's plans. Yovov made his Cypriot First Division debut for Aris in a 1–0 home loss against Ethnikos Achna on 12 January, coming on as a 17th-minute substitute for Laurențiu Diniță. He played 14 games for the club, scoring once in a 2–1 home win over Enosis Neon Paralimni, but Aris were relegated at the end of the season and his contract was terminated by mutual consent.

=== Apollon Limassol ===
On 3 June 2008, Yovov signed a two-year contract with Apollon Limassol and scored his first goal in a 2–1 home loss against Anorthosis Famagusta on 23 November 2008.

=== Return to Levski Sofia ===
On 2 February 2009, he officially joinеd Levski Sofia, taking the number 10 shirt. He made his second debut for Levski came on 4 March in a 2–0 win over Vihren Sandanski.

Yovov holds the record of the fastest goal ever scored in A PFG, scoring in the 19th second of the match against Lokomotiv Plovdiv.

Yovov became a Champion of Bulgaria in 2009. On 21 July 2009, Yovov opened his goal account for the new 2009–10 season in the second match of the second qualifying round of the Champions League, where Levski beat Sant Julià away, 5–0. On 18 December 2009, Yovov scored the winning goal in a game against Lazio in a UEFA Europa League match.

In the 2009–10 season, Levski achieved qualification for the Europa League by finishing third in the final league table. During the season, Yovov finished as topscorer for Levski with 13 goals in all competitions.

Levski started the 2010–11 season with a match against Dundalk in a second qualifying round for Europa League. Levski won the first match and the result was 6–0, with Yovov scoring in the 11th minute, Levski's first goal.

During the 2011–12 season, Yovov continued to be first choice for Levski, managing 8 goals in 23 A PFG appearances, but was sent off on two occasions – on 15 March 2012, in a Bulgarian Cup match against Lokomotiv Plovdiv, and on 2 April in a championship game against Ludogorets Razgrad.

On 19 July 2012, Yovov played for Levski in the 1–0 home win over FK Sarajevo in a Europa League match and thus became the player with the most appearances for Bulgarian teams in European competitions, surpassing the record set by former Levski teammate Elin Topuzakov. Yovov has participated in 66 matches for Bulgarian teams in European club tournaments (50 with Levski and 16 with Litex Lovech). His milestone was itself eclipsed on 4 October 2018 when both Svetoslav Dyakov and Cosmin Moți played in Ludogorets' 0:1 away loss against FC Zürich in the group stage of the UEFA Europa League. On 6 May 2013, in the 2–1 home win over Minyor Pernik, Yovov made his 300th A PFG appearance.

=== International career ===
Yovov earned his first cap for the Bulgaria national team on 10 March 1998, in the 2–0 away loss against Argentina in a friendly match, coming on as a late second half substitute for Marian Hristov.

== Political career ==
During the 2011 local elections in Bulgaria, Yovov was a mayoral candidate for his home town of Svoge, finishing in third place after the first election round.

== Career statistics ==
=== Club ===
Appearances and goals by club, season and competition
Club	Season	League			Cups		Europe		Other		Total	
Club	Season	Division	Apps	Goals	Apps	Goals	Apps	Goals	Apps	Goals	Apps	Goals
Levski Sofia	1994–95	A Group	0	0	1	0	0	0	–		1	0
Levski Sofia	1995–96	A Group	25	10	6	1	3	0	–		33	11
Levski Sofia	1996–97	A Group	21	6	7	3	0	0	–		28	9
Levski Sofia	1997–98	A Group	11	3	3	1	2	0	–		16	4
Levski Sofia	Total		56	19	17	5	5	0	0	0	78	24
1860 Munich	1997–98	Bundesliga	5	0	0	0	—		—		5	0
1860 Munich	1998–99	Bundesliga	4	1	2	0	—		—		6	1
1860 Munich	Total		9	1	2	0	0	0	0	0	11	1
Lokomotiv Sofia (loan)	1998–99	A Group	12	6			—		—		15	6
Litex Lovech	1999–2000	A Group	12	9			0	0			12	9
Litex Lovech	2000–01	A Group	20	17			0	0			20	17
Litex Lovech	2001–02	A Group	31	12			8	0			39	12
Litex Lovech	2002–03	A Group	20	7			4	2			24	9
Litex Lovech	2003–04	A Group	4	0			1	0			5	0
Litex Lovech	2004–05	A Group	9	2			3	0			12	9
Litex Lovech	Total		96	47	0	0	16	2	0	0	112	49
Levski Sofia	2004–05	A Group	9	4	2	0	0	0	–		11	4
Levski Sofia	2005–06	A Group	19	4	2	0	13	3	–		34	7
Levski Sofia	2006–07	A Group	24	13	5	1	9	0	1	0	39	14
Levski Sofia	2007–08	A Group	11	1	1	0	2	0	1	0	15	1
Levski Sofia	Total		63	22	10	1	24	3	2	0	99	26
Aris Limassol	2007–08	Cypriot First Division	14	1	?	?	—		—		14	1
Apollon Limassol	2008–09	Cypriot First Division	7	2	?	?	—		—		7	2
Levski Sofia	2008–09	A Group	11	4	2	0	0	0	–		13	4
Levski Sofia	2009–10	A Group	24	11	0	0	11	3	–		35	14
Levski Sofia	2010–11	A Group	16	7	0	0	7	1	–		23	8
Levski Sofia	2011–12	A Group	25	8	3	0	2	0	–		30	8
Levski Sofia	2012–13	A Group	20	2	6	1	1	0	–		27	2
Levski Sofia	Total		96	32	11	1	21	4	0	0	128	37
Career total			353	130	43	7	66	9	2	0	464	146

=== International ===
Scores and results list Bulgaria's goal tally first, score column indicates score after each Yovov goal.

List of international goals scored by Hristo Yovov
No.	Date	Venue	Opponent	Score	Result	Competition
1	16 February 1999	Mong Kok Stadium, Mong Kok, Hong Kong	Egypt	1–3	1–3	1999 Lunar New Year Cup
	19 February 1999	Mong Kok Stadium, Mong Kok, Hong Kong	Hong Kong League XI	2–0	3–0	1999 Lunar New Year Cup (unofficial friendly)
	19 February 1999	Mong Kok Stadium, Mong Kok, Hong Kong	Hong Kong League XI	3–0	3–0	1999 Lunar New Year Cup (unofficial friendly)
2	3 March 1999	Stadion Beroe, Stara Zagora, Bulgaria	Slovakia	2–0	2–0	Friendly
3	27 March 1999	Stade Roi Baudouin, Brussels, Belgium	Belgium	1–0	1–0	Friendly
4	14 November 2000	Stade du 5 Juillet, Algiers, Algeria	Algeria	2–1	2–1	Friendly
5	6 February 2007	GSZ Stadium, Larnaca, Cyprus	Latvia	2–0	2–0	Friendly

== Awards ==
- A Group: 1995, 2006, 2007, 2009
- Bulgarian Cup: 2005, 2007
- Bulgarian Supercup: 2005, 2007, 2009
