= Stanislav Angelov =

Bulgarian footballer

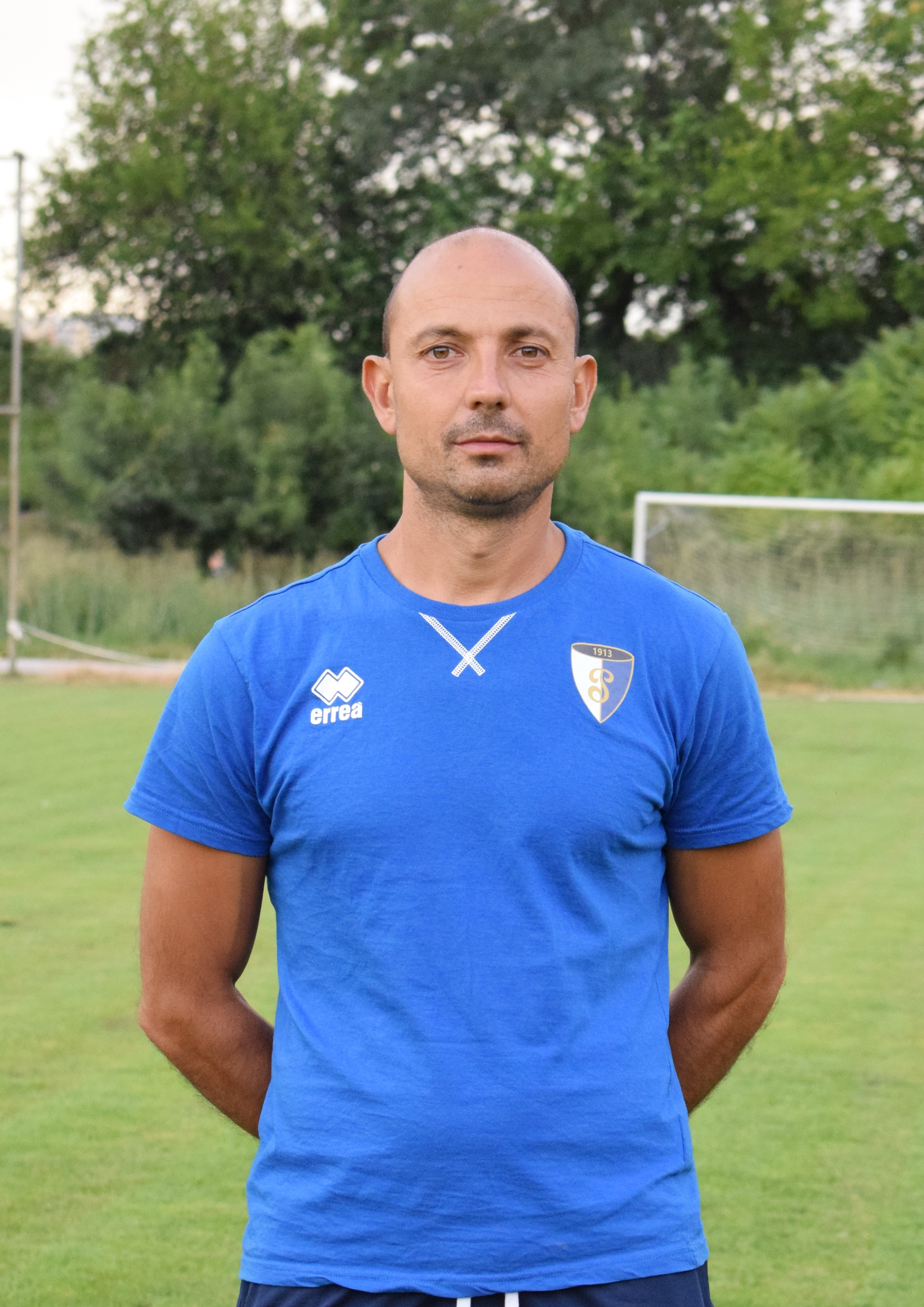

Personal information
- Full name: Stanislav Petkov Angelov
- Date of birth: 12 April 1978 (age 48)
- Place of birth: Sofia, Bulgaria
- Height: 1.78 m (5 ft 10 in)
- Position: Defensive midfielder

Team information
- Current team: Levski-Rakovski (manager)

Youth career
- OFC Sofia

Senior career*
Years	Team	Apps	(Gls)
1998–2001	CSKA Sofia	29	(1)
2001–2007	Levski Sofia	127	(9)
2007–2010	Energie Cottbus	88	(6)
2010	Steaua București	3	(0)
2011–2012	Anorthosis Famagusta	34	(3)
2012–2014	Levski Sofia	49	(2)
Total		330	(21)

International career
2006–2011	Bulgaria	39	(1)

Managerial career
- 2022–: Levski-Rakovski
- * Club domestic league appearances and goals

Stanislav Angelov (Bulgarian: Станислав Ангелов; born 12 April 1978), also known as Peleto (Bulgarian: Пелето), is a former Bulgarian footballer and currently owner and manager of Levski-Rakovski. Angelov played mainly as a defensive midfielder, but also as a full-back or centre-back.

== Career ==
=== CSKA Sofia ===
Born in Sofia, Angelov started his career at CSKA Sofia, where he played as a left back. He made his first appearance for the club during the 1998–99 season and has been a regular player since the 1999–2000 season. He made his debut on 17 April 1999, in a 0–2 home loss against Metalurg Pernik. Angelov scored his first career goal in a 4–0 win over Shumen on 6 May 2000. In June 2001, Stanislav made a hugely controversial move to CSKA's bitter rivals Levski Sofia. He left CSKA on a free transfer after his contract with the club had expired.

=== Levski Sofia ===
Angelov spent six seasons of his career at Levski. During that period, he won three A PFG titles, became a four times holder of the Bulgarian Cup and two times of the Bulgarian Supercup. With Levski he reached the quarter-finals of UEFA Cup in 2005–06. In the next season, Levski Sofia reached the group-stage of UEFA Champions League, becoming the first Bulgarian team that reached the groups.

=== Energie Cottbus ===
On 13 June 2007, the German club Energie Cottbus officially announced they have signed the player for three years until 2010. That was followed by an immediate reaction from Levski, who denied any such deal, and stated that Angelov was still their player and that he had acted incongruently with the terms of his current contract. After the end of his contract on 30 June 2010 he left Energie Cottbus because he wanted a new challenge.

=== Steaua București ===
On 9 July 2010, it was officially announced that Angelov had signed with Steaua. On 19 August 2010, he made his debut for Steaua in the Europa League against Grasshopper. His first match in Liga I was played on 29 August 2010, against FC Timişoara. His contract was ended after only half a season.

=== Anorthosis ===
On 4 January 2011, Angelov signed a one-a-half-year deal with Cyprus side Anorthosis Famagusta. On the same day he made his team début, in a 2–0 friendly win against Othellos Athienou. Angelov made his competitive debut for Anorthosis on 8 January in a 2–0 home win against APOEL. He played 90 minutes as a centre back. On 13 February 2011, Angelov scored his first goal for Anorthosis in a 4–1 win against Doxa Katokopias.

=== Levski Sofia ===
Angelov returned to Levski during the summer of 2012 and was soon given the captain's armband. On 19 May 2013, he scored a last-minute goal against Ludogorets Razgrad in a crucial derby encounter to put the "bluemen" temporarily in first place in the A PFG standings, but Levski Sofia subsequently failed to win the title, as they were held to a 1–1 draw in their next match against Slavia Sofia.

Angelov played for one more season with Levski before retiring from professional football. His last game was a friendly match organised for the 100th anniversary of Levski against Lazio.

== Managing career ==
In 2014 Angelov become head director of Levski-Rakovski Academy whose parent club was Levski Sofia. In 2017, the club split from Levski Sofia and was run by Angelov as a new club. In 2019, the team joined 4th level of Bulgarian football.

== International career ==
Angelov's debut with the Bulgarian national team was at the 2006 Kirin Cup in Japan.

=== International goal ===
Scores and results list Bulgaria's goal tally first, score column indicates score after each Angelov goal.

No.	Date	Venue	Opponent	Score	Result	Competition
1	14 October 2009	Vasil Levski National Stadium, Sofia, Bulgaria	Georgia	4–0	6–2	2010 World Cup qualifier

== Career statistics ==
Club	Season	League		Cup		Europe		Total	
Club	Season	Apps	Goals	Apps	Goals	Apps	Goals	Apps	Goals
CSKA Sofia	1998–99	4	0	0	0	0	0	4	0
CSKA Sofia	1999–00	11	1	2	0	0	0	13	1
CSKA Sofia	2000–01	14	0	2	0	3	0	19	0
CSKA Sofia	Total	29	1	4	0	3	0	36	1
Levski Sofia	2001–02	28	5	5	1	6	0	39	6
Levski Sofia	2002–03	20	1	6	0	6	0	32	1
Levski Sofia	2003–04	10	0	5	0	6	0	21	0
Levski Sofia	2004–05	21	0	5	0	2	0	28	0
Levski Sofia	2005–06	22	2	2	0	13	0	37	2
Levski Sofia	2006–07	26	1	4	0	10	0	40	1
Levski Sofia	Total	127	9	27	1	43	0	197	10
Energie Cottbus	2007–08	31	1	0	0	–	–	31	1
Energie Cottbus	2008–09	26	2	3	0	–	–	29	2
Energie Cottbus	2009–10	31	3	1	0	–	–	32	3
Energie Cottbus	Total	88	6	4	0	0	0	92	6
Steaua București	2010–11	3	0	0	0	8	0	11	0
Steaua București	Total	3	0	0	0	8	0	11	0
Anorthosis Famagusta	2010–11	15	2	1	0	0	0	16	2
Anorthosis Famagusta	2011–12	19	1					19	1
Anorthosis Famagusta	Total	34	3	1	0	0	0	35	3
Levski Sofia	2012–13	23	2	5	0	2	0	30	1
Levski Sofia	2013–14	26	0	4	0	2	0	30	0
Levski Sofia	Total	49	2	9	0	4	0	60	1
Career totals		330	21	45	1	58	0	433	22

== Honours ==
Levski Sofia

- Bulgarian Championship: 2002, 2006, 2007
- Bulgarian Cup: 1999, 2002, 2003, 2005, 2007
- Bulgarian Supercup: 2005, 2007
