= FC Rodopa Smolyan =

Bulgarian football club

Rodopa
- Full name: Football Club Rodopa Smolyan
- Founded: 1927; 99 years ago
- Ground: Stadion Septemvri
- Capacity: 6 000
- Chairman: Petar Mandzhukov
- Manager: Yuliyan Syurdzhiev
- League: South-East Third League
- 2025–26: South-East Third League, 13th
Home colours	Away colours

FC Rodopa (ФК Родопа) is a Bulgarian football club based in Smolyan, which currently plays in the South-East Third League, the third tier of Bulgarian football league system. The team was named after the Rhodope Mountains and plays its home matches at the local Stadion Septemvri. Rodopa's traditional home kit consists of green and white.

Rodopa was founded in 1927. The club spent the majority of its history playing between the second and third tiers of Bulgarian football. In 2003, Rodopa managed to promote to the A Group for the first time in its history. The team managed to remain four seasons in the top division, before suffering relegation at the end of the 2006–07 season. Since then, the club has returned to lower leagues.

== History ==
=== The Beginning ===
Smolyan has had various football clubs in different periods, the most notable of them being Rodopets (since 1957). FC Rodopa was formed by separating from the local sports association in 1985. However, prior to that Smolyan has football team representation in both B and V groups.

=== Member of the Bulgarian Elite ===
Rodopa qualified for the top division for the first time in their history by winning the B Group in the 2002–03 season.

In the first ever season in the Bulgarian elite for Rodopa, the team managed to finish in 10th place, which was a success for the club, since they avoided relegation, with that being the main goal. The team achieved 10 wins, 3 draws and 17 losses, which earned them 33 points. They also managed to beat Bulgarian powerhouse Levski Sofia at home, one of the best teams that season and in general.

In their second top-flight season, Rodopa achieved a 12th-place finish, being one point above relegated Vidima Rakovski.

In their third season in A Group, Rodopa Smolyan finished 12th, 2 points above relegated PFC Pirin Blagoevgrad, once more avoiding relegation.

In the 2006-07 season, Rodopa did not perform so well and was relegated to the B Group after finishing 15th, ending the club's four-year stint in the A Group.

=== Rapid decline and return to amateur football ===
After the 2006–07 season, Rodopa played three seasons in the B Group. However, in 2010, the club was relegated from the second tier. The following season, Rodopa finished 15th in the V Group, dropping yet another level. In 2011, the club was dissolved due to growing financial problems. Rodopa was reformed the next year but dissolved once more in 2014. The club was reformed a second time in 2014, and began playing in the A RFG (fourth tier).

Rodopa managed to return to the Bulgarian third league for the 2019–20 season. The team joined the Southeast Third League, based on the geographic location of their home town, Smolyan. Rodopa finished 12th in the third tier for the 2019–20 season.

== Honours ==
- Tenth place in the "A" group: 2003/04
- First place in the "B" group - 2002/03
- Cup of Bulgarian Amateur Football League 1997/98
- Seasons in the "A" group, from 2003/04 to 2006/07
- 1/4 Finalist in the National Cup Tournament: at that time its official name is Cup of Bulgaria - 2003/04

== Current squad ==
As of 1 September 2019 Note: Flags indicate national team as defined under FIFA eligibility rules; some limited exceptions apply. Players may hold more than one non-FIFA nationality.

No.	Pos.	Nation	Player
1	GK	BUL	Borislav Hadzhiychev
4	DF	BUL	Stefan Kikov
5	DF	BUL	Valentin Furlanski
6	MF	BUL	Lyuboslav Petrov
7	MF	BUL	Hristo Kovachev
8	MF	BUL	Erik Smilyanov
9	FW	BUL	Stefan Chilingirov
10	MF	BUL	Vladimir Dramaliev
11	FW	BUL	Nikolay Tihomirov

No.	Pos.	Nation	Player
12	GK	BUL	Zdravko Chavdarov
13	DF	BUL	Georgi Milev
16	FW	BUL	Valentin Draganov
17	DF	BUL	Dimitar Cholakov
19	DF	BUL	Elmir Mustanski
21	MF	BUL	Teodor Stefanov
22	DF	BUL	Dimitar Bogutev
27	MF	BUL	Georgi Peltekov
29	MF	BUL	Nikolay Manchev

== Notable players ==
Had international caps for their respective countries, held any club record, or had more than 100 league appearances. Players whose name is listed in bold represented their countries.

Bulgaria

- (Bulgaria) **Danail Bachkov**
- (Bulgaria) **Boko Dimitrov**
- (Bulgaria) **Kamen Hadzhiev**
- (Bulgaria) **Milan Koprivarov**
- (Bulgaria) **Yordan Linkov**
- (Bulgaria) **Yordan Minev**
- (Bulgaria) Daniel Peev
- (Bulgaria) Emil Petkov
- (Bulgaria) **Petko Petkov**
- (Bulgaria) **Zahari Sirakov**
- (Bulgaria) **Veselin Velikov**

Asia

- (Uzbekistan) **Aleksey Dionisiev**
