= 1996 Bulgarian Cup final =

- Event: 1995–96 Bulgarian Cup
Slavia Sofia	Levski Sofia
A Group	A Group
4	0
- Date: 1 May 1996
- Venue: Vasil Levski Stadium, Sofia
- Man of the Match: Nasko Sirakov
- Referee: Mitko Mitrev (Sofia)
- Attendance: 19,500

The 1996 Bulgarian Cup final was played at the Vasil Levski National Stadium in Sofia on 1 May 1996, and was contested between the sides of Slavia Sofia and Levski Sofia. The match was won by Slavia Sofia. The Levski Sofia players were ordered off the field of play by the chairman Tomas Lafchis shortly after the 75' mark due to the latter's dissatisfaction with the refereeing. Slavia were eventually awarded a 4:0 victory while the 11 footballers who left the pitch were banned for 4 matches.

== Match ==
=== Details ===
1 May 1996
18:00 EEST

Slavia Sofia	4–0 (w/o)	Levski Sofia
Kirov 35'	In 75th minute the match was cancelled by Levski's chairman Tomas Lafchis.

Vasil Levski National Stadium, Sofia
Attendance: 19,500
Referee: Mitko Mitrev (Sofia)

Slavia	Levski

Slavia:
GK	1	(Bulgaria) Zdravko Zdravkov
DF	2	(Bulgaria) Vladimir Ivanov
DF	3	(Bulgaria) Petar Tsvetanov
DF	4	(Bulgaria) Stefan Kolev (c) (yellow card)
DF	5	(Bulgaria) Kiril Kachamanov (yellow card)
MF	6	(Federal Republic of Yugoslavia) Zoran Ristić
MF	7	(Bulgaria) Diyan Angelov
FW	8	(Bulgaria) Nasko Sirakov
MF	9	(Bulgaria) Anton Dimitrov
MF	10	(Bulgaria) Tsvetozar Dermendzhiev	(substituted off) 64'
FW	11	(Bulgaria) Atanas Kirov
Substitutes:
MF	13	(Bulgaria) Aleksandar Zahariev	(substituted in) 64'
Manager:
(Bulgaria) Stoyan Kotsev

Levski:
GK	1	(Bulgaria) Plamen Nikolov
DF	2	(Bulgaria) Borislav Iliev
DF	3	(Bulgaria) Valentin Dartilov (yellow card)
DF	4	(Bulgaria) Georgi Ivanov
DF	5	(Bulgaria) Ivan Vasilev (yellow card)
MF	6	(Bulgaria) Vladimir Yonkov (yellow card)
FW	7	(Bulgaria) Plamen Timnev	(substituted off) 46'
MF	8	(Bulgaria) Marian Hristov
FW	9	(Bulgaria) Iliyan Simeonov (yellow card)
MF	10	(Bulgaria) Emil Velev (c) (yellow card)	(substituted off) 67'
FW	11	(Bulgaria) Hristo Yovov	(substituted off) 62'
Substitutes:
MF	14	(Bulgaria) Todor Zaytsev	(substituted in) 46'
DF	15	(Bulgaria) Petar Penchev	(substituted in) 67'
FW	16	(Bulgaria) Doncho Donev	(substituted in) 62'
Manager:
(Bulgaria) Ivan Kyuchukov

MAN OF THE MATCH

MATCH OFFICIALS

- Assistant referees:Lyubcho Slavchev & Aleksey Iliev
- Fourth official: Mladen Blagoev (Sofia)

MATCH RULES

- 90 minutes.
- 30 minutes of extra-time if necessary.
- Penalty shoot-out if scores still level.
- Five named substitutes.
- Maximum of three substitutions.

== See also ==
- 1995–96 A Group
