= 1995–96 A Group =

48th completed season of top-tier football league in Bulgaria

A Group
- Season: 1995–96
- Dates: 12 August 1995 – 11 May 1996
- Champions: Slavia Sofia (7th title)
- Relegated: Shumen; Lovech; Spartak Plovdiv
- UEFA Cup: Slavia; Lokomotiv Sofia
- Matches: 240
- Goals: 592 (2.47 per match)
- Top goalscorer: Ivo Georgiev (21 goals)

The 1995–96 A Group was the 48th season of the A Football Group, the top Bulgarian professional league for association football clubs, since its establishment in 1948.

== Overview ==
It was contested by 16 teams, and Slavia Sofia won the championship. Lovech, renamed from Lex Lovech in the previous season, were relegated along with Spartak Plovdiv, and Shumen.

== Team information ==
=== Stadia and locations ===
The following teams have ensured their participation in A Group for season 1995–96 (listed in alphabetical order):

Location of teams in 1995–96 A Group
Sofia 1995–96 A Group football clubs

Team	City	Stadium	Capacity
Botev	Plovdiv	Hristo Botev	18,000
CSKA	Sofia	Bulgarian Army	22,995
Dobrudzha	Dobrich	Druzhba	12,500
Etar	Veliko Tarnovo	Ivaylo	18,000
Levski	Kyustendil	Osogovo	10,000
Levski	Sofia	Georgi Asparuhov	29,986
Lokomotiv	Plovdiv	Lokomotiv	24,000
Lokomotiv	Sofia	Lokomotiv	22,000
Lovech	Lovech	Lovech	7,050
Montana	Montana	Ogosta	8,000
Neftochimic	Burgas	Lazur	18,037
Rakovski	Ruse	Gradski	20,000
Shumen	Shumen	Panayot Volov	24,000
Slavia	Sofia	Ovcha Kupel	18,000
Spartak	Plovdiv	Todor Diev	11,353
Spartak	Varna	Spartak	8,000

== League standings ==
Pos	Team	Pld	W	D	L	GF	GA	GD	Pts	Qualification or relegation
1	Slavia Sofia (C)	30	20	7	3	51	14	+37	67	Qualification for UEFA Cup preliminary round
2	Levski Sofia	30	19	5	6	49	22	+27	62	Qualification for Cup Winners' Cup first round
3	Lokomotiv Sofia	30	17	7	6	55	24	+31	58	Qualification for UEFA Cup preliminary round
4	Neftochimic Burgas	30	17	6	7	58	31	+27	57	
5	CSKA Sofia	30	16	8	6	49	26	+23	56	Qualification for Intertoto Cup group stage
6	Spartak Varna	30	13	2	15	47	52	−5	41	Qualification for Intertoto Cup group stage
7	Dobrudzha Dobrich	30	12	3	15	30	43	−13	39	
8	Levski Kyustendil	30	10	7	13	27	37	−10	37	
9	Montana	30	9	9	12	33	35	−2	36	
10	Botev Plovdiv	30	10	6	14	33	38	−5	36	
11	Lokomotiv Plovdiv	30	10	5	15	25	50	−25	35	
12	Etar Veliko Tarnovo	30	9	6	15	21	37	−16	33	
13	Rakovski Ruse	30	9	5	16	33	41	−8	32	
14	Shumen (R)	30	9	5	16	28	44	−16	32	Relegation to 1996–97 B Group
15	Lovech (R)	30	7	9	14	29	40	−11	30	Relegation to 1996–97 B Group
16	Spartak Plovdiv (R)	30	6	4	20	24	58	−34	22	Relegation to 1996–97 B Group

Source: rsssf.com
(C) Champions; (R) Relegated

== Results ==
Home \ Away	BOT	CSK	DOB	ETA	LVK	LEV	LPL	LSO	LOV	MON	NEF	RAK	SHU	SLA	SPP	SPV
Botev Plovdiv		0–4	1–0	1–0	3–0	1–1	5–0	3–0	1–0	0–0	2–1	1–1	0–1	0–1	2–0	1–3
CSKA Sofia	3–0		2–1	1–1	3–0	1–0	1–0	1–5	4–0	1–2	1–1	2–0	4–2	1–0	3–1	4–0
Dobrudzha Dobrich	1–0	2–0		0–2	2–1	2–1	2–0	0–1	1–2	1–0	1–3	2–0	1–0	1–0	1–0	3–2
Etar Veliko Tarnovo	1–2	0–0	2–2		1–0	0–1	3–0	0–1	1–0	4–0	0–2	1–0	1–0	0–2	1–0	2–1
Levski Kyustendil	2–1	0–0	2–0	2–0		2–0	0–0	2–1	0–0	1–1	1–0	3–0	2–0	0–0	3–0	1–0
Levski Sofia	2–1	3–1	2–0	2–0	3–0		4–0	0–1	4–0	2–1	1–2	1–0	2–1	0–0	3–0	4–1
Lokomotiv Plovdiv	0–0	2–1	3–1	2–0	2–2	0–1		1–0	2–1	0–4	2–0	2–0	2–0	2–4	1–0	2–1
Lokomotiv Sofia	2–1	0–0	2–0	3–0	3–0	0–2	4–0		3–1	3–0	3–1	4–1	1–1	2–2	4–0	5–0
Lovech	3–0	0–0	0–0	0–0	3–0	1–1	1–1	2–0		1–1	0–2	2–1	3–0	0–1	2–0	0–0
Montana	3–0	0–1	3–0	0–0	1–1	1–3	2–0	0–0	3–2		0–0	1–0	3–1	1–1	1–2	2–3
Neftochimic Burgas	2–0	2–2	5–1	3–0	3–0	5–1	4–0	1–1	5–2	1–0		3–2	0–0	1–0	2–0	5–2
Rakovski Ruse	1–1	0–1	3–1	1–1	1–0	0–1	4–1	2–1	2–0	0–0	2–1		4–0	2–4	2–0	3–0
Shumen	1–1	1–0	1–0	3–0	3–1	0–2	1–0	0–0	1–1	0–1	2–3	2–0		0–1	3–1	2–0
Slavia Sofia	1–0	0–0	2–0	2–0	3–0	1–1	2–0	1–1	2–0	3–1	2–0	2–0	4–0		2–0	3–0
Spartak Plovdiv	2–4	2–4	1–1	3–0	1–0	0–1	0–0	1–2	2–1	2–1	0–0	0–0	4–2	1–3		0–1
Spartak Varna	2–1	1–3	2–3	3–0	2–1	0–0	2–0	1–2	2–1	2–0	3–0	3–1	2–0	0–2	8–1	

Source: A PFG (in Bulgarian)
Legend: Blue = home team win; Yellow = draw; Red = away team win.

== Champions ==
Slavia Sofia

Goalkeepers
(Bulgaria) Zdravko Zdravkov	29	(0)
(Bulgaria) Tsvetan Zdravkov	0	(0)
(Bulgaria) Stoycho Dragov	2	(0)

Defenders
(Bulgaria) Petar Tsvetanov	24	(2)
(Bulgaria) Mihail Zahariev	10	(0)
(Bulgaria) Vladimir Ivanov	28	(3)
(Bulgaria) Stoyan Atsarov	30	(1)
(Bulgaria) Kiril Kachamanov	28	(1)
(Bulgaria) Mario Dafkov	8	(1)
(Bulgaria) Stefan Kolev	28	(0)
(Bulgaria) Dobromir Minchev	11	(0)
(Bulgaria) Ivan Paskov*	1	(0)

Midfielders
(Bulgaria) Marius Urukov	28	(4)
(Bulgaria) Tsvetozar Dermendzhiev	7	(0)
(Bulgaria) Kiril Metkov	4	(0)
(Bulgaria) Diyan Angelov	13	(1)
(Federal Republic of Yugoslavia) Zoran Ristić	13	(0)
(Bulgaria) Danail Zhelyazkov	3	(0)
(Bulgaria) Geno Dobrevski*	13	(1)
(Bulgaria) Ivan Dobrevski	10	(1)
(Bulgaria) Vladko Shalamanov*	13	(9)
(Bulgaria) Anton Dimitrov	24	(1)

Forwards
(Bulgaria) Nikolay Pramatarov	6	(0)
(Bulgaria) Atanas Kirov	28	(7)
(Bulgaria) Dimitar Totev	15	(1)
(Bulgaria) Ivan Dimitrov	3	(0)
(Bulgaria) Aleksandar Bonchev*	3	(0)
(Bulgaria) Nasko Sirakov	20	(16)
(Bulgaria) Vanyo Shishkov*	6	(0)

Manager
(Bulgaria) Stoyan Kotsev

- Paskov, G. Dobrevski, Shalamanov, Bonchev and Shishkov left the club during a season.

== Top scorers ==
Rank	Scorer	Club	Goals
1	(Bulgaria) Ivo Georgiev	Spartak Varna	21
2	(Bulgaria) Vesko Petkov	Neftochimic Burgas	18
3	(Bulgaria) Nasko Sirakov	Slavia Sofia	16
4	(Bulgaria) Simeon Chilibonov	Lokomotiv Sofia	12
5	(Bulgaria) Anatoli Tonov	Montana	11
5	(Bulgaria) Dimcho Belyakov	Lovech	11
7	(Bulgaria) Hristo Yovov	Levski Sofia	10
7	(Bulgaria) Marian Hristov	Levski Sofia	10
9	(Bulgaria) Vladko Shalamanov	Slavia Sofia	9
9	(Bulgaria) Petar Mihtarski	CSKA Sofia	9
9	(Bulgaria) Doncho Donev	Levski Sofia	9
9	(Bulgaria) Petar Zhabov	CSKA Sofia	9
9	(Bulgaria) Dimitar Totev	Slavia Sofia	9

- Source:1995–96 Top Goalscorers
