= 1992 Bulgarian Cup final =

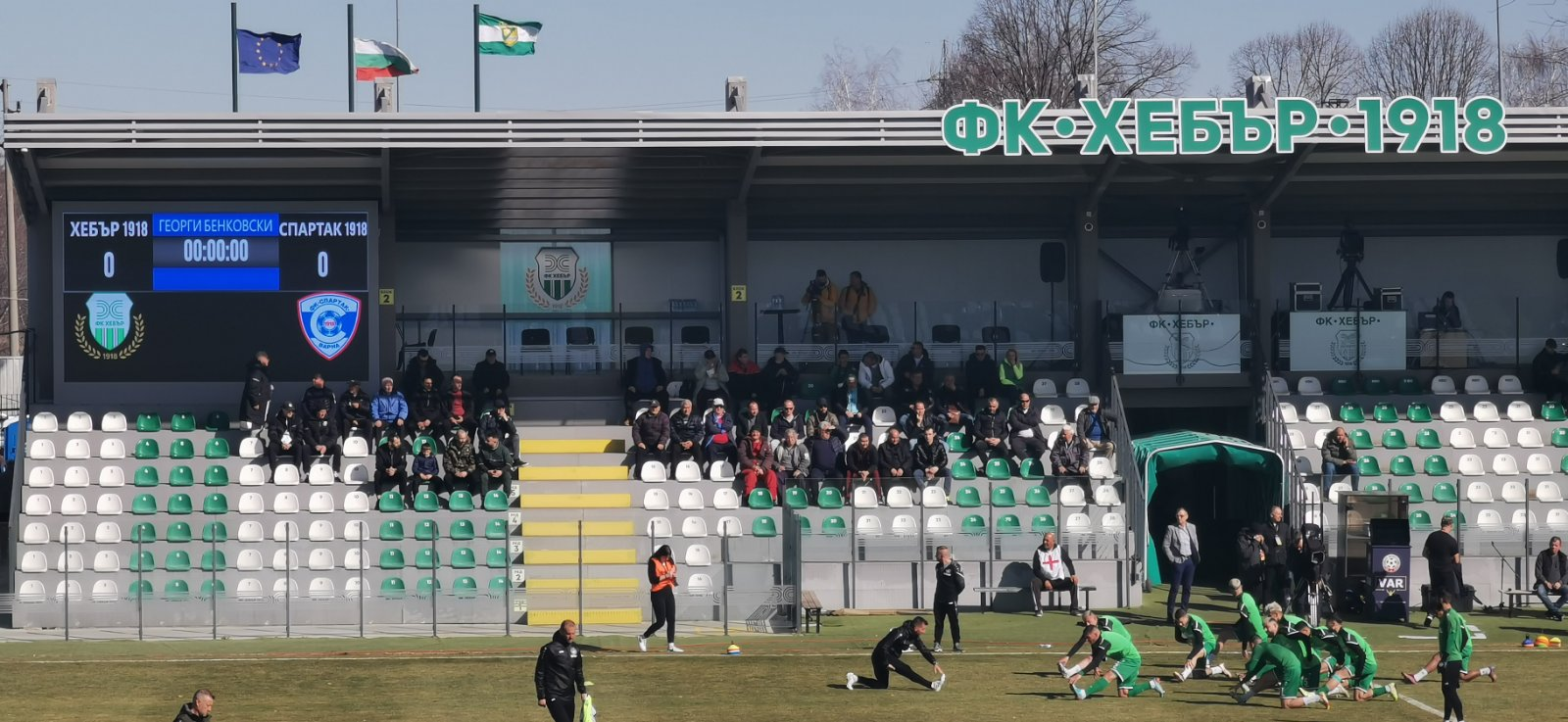
- Event: 1991–92 Bulgarian Cup
Levski Sofia	Pirin Blagoevgrad
5	0
- Date: 27 May 1992
- Venue: Georgi Benkovski Stadium, Pazardzhik
- Referee: Stefan Chakarov (Veliko Tarnovo)
- Attendance: 10,000

The 1992 Bulgarian Cup final was the 52nd final of the Bulgarian Cup, and was contested between Levski Sofia and Pirin Blagoevgrad on 27 May 1992 at Georgi Benkovski Stadium in Pazardzhik. Levski won the final 5–0.

== Match ==
=== Details ===
27 May 1992

Levski Sofia	5−0	Pirin Blagoevgrad
Stoilov 44' (pen.), 51'; G. Dimitrov 73'; Iliev 81'; Yotov 87'

Georgi Benkovski Stadium, Pazardzhik
Attendance: 10,000
Referee: Stefan Chakarov (Veliko Tarnovo)

Levski	Pirin

GK	1	(Bulgaria) Plamen Nikolov
DF	2	(Bulgaria) Petar Hubchev
DF	3	(Bulgaria) Valentin Dartilov
DF	4	(Bulgaria) Stoyan Pumpalov
DF	5	(Bulgaria) Aleksandar Markov
MF	6	(Bulgaria) Zlatko Yankov
FW	7	(Bulgaria) Georgi Dimitrov
MF	8	(Bulgaria) Yasen Petrov	(substituted off) 57'
MF	9	(Bulgaria) Stanimir Stoilov	(substituted off) 75'
MF	10	(Bulgaria) Ilian Iliev
FW	11	(Bulgaria) Velko Yotov
Substitutes:
GK	12	(Bulgaria) Zdravko Zdravkov
DF	13	(Bulgaria) Krasimir Koev	(substituted on) 75'
MF	14	(Bulgaria) Daniel Borimirov	(substituted on) 57'
FW	15	(Bulgaria) Georgi Donkov
MF	16	(Bulgaria) Ivaylo Yonchev
Manager:
(Bulgaria) Ivan Vutov

GK	1	(Bulgaria) Kiril Stoykov
DF	2	(Bulgaria) Kostadin Trendafilov
DF	3	(Bulgaria) Ivan Berbatov
DF	4	(Bulgaria) Dobromir Mitov	(substituted off) 73'
DF	5	(Bulgaria) Ivan Lardev (c)	(substituted off) 57'
MF	6	(Bulgaria) Stefan Goshev
MF	7	(Bulgaria) Kostadin Gerganchev
MF	8	(Bulgaria) Malin Orachev
FW	9	(Bulgaria) Bozhidar Yankov
MF	10	(Bulgaria) Emil Mitsanski
FW	11	(Bulgaria) Rumen Chakarov
Substitutes:
GK	12	(Bulgaria) Miroslav Mitev
MF	13	(Bulgaria) Hristo Voynov
DF	14	(Bulgaria) Georgi Ovnarski	(substituted on) 73'
MF	15	(Bulgaria) Petar Kosturkov	(substituted on) 57'
FW	16	(Bulgaria) Aleksandar Tsarevski
Manager:
(Bulgaria) Boris Nikolov

== See also ==
- 1991–92 A Group
