= 1998–99 A Group =

51st completed season of top-tier football league in Bulgaria

A Group
- Season: 1998–99
- Dates: 7 August 1998 – 29 May 1999
- Champions: Litex Lovech (2nd title)
- Relegated: Metalurg; Lokomotiv Plovdiv; Septemvri
- Champions League: Litex Lovech
- UEFA Cup: Levski Sofia; CSKA Sofia
- Matches: 239
- Goals: 719 (3.01 per match)
- Top goalscorer: Dimcho Belyakov (21 goals)

The 1998–99 A Group was the 51st season of the A Football Group, the top Bulgarian professional league for association football clubs, since its establishment in 1948.

== Overview ==
It was contested by 16 teams, and Litex Lovech won the championship.

== Team information ==
=== Stadia and locations ===
The following teams have ensured their participation in A Group for season 1998–99 (listed in alphabetical order):

Location of teams in 1998–99 A Group
Sofia 1998–99 A Group football clubs

Team	City	Stadium	Capacity
Botev	Plovdiv	Hristo Botev	18,000
CSKA	Sofia	Bulgarian Army	22,995
Dobrudzha	Dobrich	Druzhba	12,500
Levski	Kyustendil	Osogovo	10,000
Levski	Sofia	Georgi Asparuhov	29,986
Litex	Lovech	Lovech	7,050
Lokomotiv	Plovdiv	Lokomotiv	24,000
Lokomotiv	Sofia	Lokomotiv	22,000
Metalurg	Pernik	Metalurg	18,000
Minyor	Pernik	Minyor	18,000
Neftochimic	Burgas	Lazur	18,037
Pirin	Blagoevgrad	Hristo Botev	15,000
Septemvri	Sofia	Vasil Levski	43,230
Shumen	Shumen	Panayot Volov	24,000
Slavia	Sofia	Ovcha Kupel	18,000
Spartak	Varna	Spartak	8,000

== League standings ==
Pos	Team	Pld	W	D	L	GF	GA	GD	Pts	Qualification or relegation
1	Litex Lovech (Note: Litex (Lovech) have changed name to Lovech.) (C)	30	24	4	2	83	25	+58	73 (Note: Litex and Levski three points deducted for winning fixed matches against Metalurg.)	Qualification for Champions League first qualifying round
2	Levski Sofia	30	23	5	2	51	11	+40	71	Qualification for UEFA Cup qualifying round
3	Levski Kyustendil	30	18	4	8	57	29	+28	57 (Note: Levski (Kyustendil) and CSKA (Sofia) awarded no points following April 11 match abandoned at half-time.)	
4	Lokomotiv Sofia	30	17	4	9	46	30	+16	55	
5	CSKA Sofia	30	15	6	9	54	39	+15	50	Qualification for UEFA Cup qualifying round (Note: CSKA Sofia won the 1998–99 Bulgarian Cup and qualified for the UEFA Cup qualifying round of the UEFA Cup.)
6	Neftochimic Burgas	30	15	4	11	52	38	+14	49	
7	Slavia Sofia	30	11	8	11	47	36	+11	41	
8	Minyor Pernik	30	11	7	12	44	46	−2	40	
9	Dobrudzha Dobrich	30	11	3	16	45	55	−10	36	
10	Metalurg Pernik (R)	30	11	2	17	33	46	−13	35	Relegation to 1999–2000 B Group (Note: Metalurg Pernik relegated by Bulgarian Football Union for match fixing.)
11	Pirin Blagoevgrad	30	10	4	16	35	58	−23	34	
12	Spartak Varna	30	10	4	16	39	50	−11	34	Qualification for Intertoto Cup first round
13	Botev Plovdiv	30	9	5	16	34	55	−21	32	
14	Shumen	30	8	8	14	36	56	−20	32	
15	Lokomotiv Plovdiv (R)	30	4	5	21	26	73	−47	17	Relegation to 1999–2000 B Group
16	Septemvri Sofia (R)	30	4	5	21	34	73	−39	17	Relegation to 1999–2000 B Group

Source: rsssf.com
(C) Champions; (R) Relegated

== Results ==
Home \ Away	BOT	CSK	DOB	LVK	LEV	LIT	LPL	LSO	MET	MIN	NEF	PIR	SEP	SHU	SLA	SPV
Botev Plovdiv		2–0	3–2	2–2	0–1	0–1	0–0	1–1	2–1	1–1	3–0	2–1	3–1	5–2	1–0	3–2
CSKA Sofia	5–0		3–0	3–2	2–3	2–3	6–0	2–0	0–2	2–0	1–1	3–0	3–1	3–2	1–1	2–1
Dobrudzha Dobrich	4–0	1–1		1–0	0–1	1–2	4–2	2–3	1–0	2–0	2–1	0–0	5–1	4–1	3–1	3–1
Levski Kyustendil	2–1	– (Note: Match Levski Kyustendil–CSKA Sofia was abandoned at half-time. No points were awarded to these two teams.)	3–0		0–1	1–0	5–1	1–0	7–1	2–1	3–0	2–0	4–1	3–0	3–0	2–0
Levski Sofia	6–0	2–0	2–0	3–0		0–0	2–0	1–0	1–0	2–0	3–0	5–0	2–0	2–2	1–0	1–0
Litex Lovech	2–0	8–0	5–0	2–0	1–1		5–1	3–1	2–1	3–1	3–1	8–1	4–1	2–0	3–1	3–2
Lokomotiv Plovdiv	2–1	0–0	3–1	1–2	1–2	1–4		1–3	2–0	0–1	2–4	0–0	2–0	1–3	0–0	1–3
Lokomotiv Sofia	2–0	0–2	5–2	1–0	0–1	1–0	4–1		1–0	1–0	1–0	4–1	0–0	2–1	0–2	3–1
Metalurg Pernik	3–1	1–0	1–0	1–2	0–3	1–2	1–0	2–1		1–2	0–0	2–0	4–2	2–1	1–1	2–0
Minyor Pernik	1–0	2–0	4–2	0–0	2–2	2–3	2–0	1–5	3–4		1–0	2–1	2–2	2–0	1–1	5–0
Neftochimic Burgas	3–1	3–0	2–0	3–1	1–0	1–4	4–1	0–0	2–0	2–1		6–1	1–3	6–1	2–0	4–1
Pirin Blagoevgrad	3–0	0–0	1–0	0–1	0–1	1–2	6–1	0–2	2–1	3–1	1–1		2–1	2–0	2–1	1–0
Septemvri Sofia	2–0	2–5	2–1	0–3	0–4	2–5	1–1	0–1	3–1	2–3	0–1	2–3		1–1	0–2	1–1
Shumen	1–1	2–5	0–0	3–3	0–1	0–0	1–0	2–0	1–0	1–1	1–0	4–1	3–2		2–1	1–1
Slavia Sofia	2–0	0–1	6–2	1–0	0–0	1–1	6–1	2–3	1–0	2–2	1–2	4–1	4–1	2–0		2–2
Spartak Varna	2–1	0–2	1–2	2–3	2–1	0–2	2–0	1–1	3–0	2–0	2–1	2–1	2–0	3–0	0–2	

Source: A PFG (in Bulgarian)
Legend: Blue = home team win; Yellow = draw; Red = away team win.

== Champions ==
Litex Lovech

Goalkeepers
1	(Bulgaria) Vitomir Vutov	19	(0)
12	(Bulgaria) Stoyan Stavrev	11	(0)

Defenders
3	(Bulgaria) Zhivko Zhelev	8	(1)
4	(Bulgaria) Stefan Kolev	26	(0)
5	(Bulgaria) Dimitar Balabanov*	1	(0)
13	(Bulgaria) Nikolay Dimitrov	22	(0)
16	(Bulgaria) Dimitar Karadaliev	16	(1)
17	(Bulgaria) Zlatomir Zagorčić	19	(1)
22	(Albania) Altin Haxhi	24	(6)
25	(Bulgaria) Radostin Kishishev	26	(1)
	(Bulgaria) Rosen Kirilov*	11	(1)

Midfielders
2	(Romania) Laurențiu Reghecampf	14	(4)
6	(Bulgaria) Rosen Emilov	15	(0)
7	(Bulgaria) Mariyan Todorov	21	(2)
8	(Bulgaria) Stoycho Stoilov	24	(9)
10	(Bulgaria) Vasil Kirov	16	(1)
15	(Serbia and Montenegro) Dragoljub Simonović	24	(9)
18	(Bulgaria) Ivaylo Petev	5	(0)
19	(Bulgaria) Veselin Sarbakov*	2	(0)
23	(Bulgaria) Svetlan Kondev	2	(0)
	(Bulgaria) Georgi Bogdanov	3	(0)

Forwards
9	(Bulgaria) Stefan Yurukov	19	(7)
11	(Bulgaria) Dimcho Belyakov	25	(21)
14	(Albania) Alban Bushi	22	(10)
20	(Bulgaria) Svetoslav Todorov	12	(2)
21	(Bulgaria) Veselin Ignatov*	5	(1)
24	(Brazil) Luis Carlos Mota	11	(1)
	(Serbia and Montenegro) Igor Bogdanović*	9	(5)
	(Bulgaria) Metodi Stoynev*	1	(0)
	(Bulgaria) Ivan Gemedzhiev	2	(0)

Manager
(Bulgaria) Ferario Spasov

- Ignatov, Kirilov, Balabanov, Sarbakov, Bogdanović and Stoynev left the club during a season.

== Top scorers ==
Rank	Scorer	Club	Goals
1	(Bulgaria) Dimcho Belyakov	Litex Lovech	21
2	(Bulgaria) Todor Pramatarov	Shumen	17
3	(Bulgaria) Hristo Marashliev	Levski Kyustendil	16
4	(Bulgaria) Georgi Georgiev	Minyor Pernik	15
5	(Bulgaria) Georgi Ivanov	Levski Sofia	13
6	(Bulgaria) Diyan Bozhilov	Dobrudzha Dobrich	12
7	(Ivory Coast) Serge Yoffou	Dobrudzha Dobrich	11
7	(Bulgaria) Dimitar Telkiyski	Botev Plovdiv	11
7	(Bulgaria) Iliya Gruev	Neftochimic Burgas	11
10	(Albania) Alban Bushi	Litex Lovech	10
10	(Bulgaria) Genadi Simeonov	Metalurg Pernik	10
10	(Bulgaria) Petar Mihtarski	Pirin Blagoevgrad	10
10	(Bulgaria) Mihail Mihaylov	Levski Kyustendil	10
10	(Bulgaria) Boyko Velichkov	Spartak Varna	10

- Source:1998–99 Top Goalscorers
