= Stoycho Dragov =

Bulgarian footballer

Personal information
- Date of birth: 30 August 1968 (age 58)
- Place of birth: Stara Zagora, Bulgaria
- Position: Goalkeeper

Senior career*
Years	Team	Apps	(Gls)
1988–1994	Beroe Stara Zagora	85	(0)
1995–1997	Slavia Sofia		
1997–1998	Metalurg Pernik		
1999–2002	Beroe Stara Zagora	42	(0)

International career
- Bulgaria U20

Managerial career
- 2008–2012: PFC Beroe (goalk. coach)
- 2016: PFC Montana (goalk. coach)
- 2014: FC Haskovo (goalk. coach)
- * Club domestic league appearances and goals

Stoycho Dragov (born 30 August 1968) is a Bulgarian former professional footballer who played as a goalkeeper. He was a squad member for the 1987 FIFA World Youth Championship.

== Honours ==
Slavia Sofia

- Bulgarian League: 1995–96
- Bulgarian Cup: 1995–96

PFC Beroe: Bulgarian Cup: 2010(goalk.coach)
