= 1992–93 A Group =

45th season of top-tier football league in Bulgaria

A Group
- Season: 1992–93
- Dates: 8 August 1992 – 5 June 1993
- Champions: Levski Sofia (18th title)
- Relegated: Haskovo, Sliven
- Champions League: Levski Sofia
- UEFA Cup: Botev Plovdiv; Lokomotiv Plovdiv
- Matches: 240
- Goals: 667 (2.78 per match)
- Top goalscorer: Plamen Getov (26 goals)

The 1992–93 A Group was the 45th season of the A Football Group, the top Bulgarian professional league for association football clubs, since its establishment in 1948.

== Overview ==
It was contested by 16 teams, and Levski Sofia won the championship.

== Team information ==
=== Stadia and locations ===
The following teams have ensured their participation in A Group for season 1992–93 (listed in alphabetical order):

Location of teams in 1992–93 A Group
Sofia 1992–93 A Group football clubs

Team	City	Stadium	Capacity
Beroe	Stara Zagora	Beroe	16,000
Botev	Plovdiv	Hristo Botev	18,000
Chernomorets	Burgas	Chernomorets	22,000
CSKA	Sofia	Bulgarian Army	22,995
Dobrudzha	Dobrich	Druzhba	12,500
Etar	Veliko Tarnovo	Ivaylo	18,000
Haskovo	Haskovo	Haskovo	12,500
Levski	Sofia	Georgi Asparuhov	29,986
Lokomotiv	Gorna Oryahovitsa	Dimitar Dyulgerov	14,000
Lokomotiv	Plovdiv	Lokomotiv	24,000
Lokomotiv	Sofia	Lokomotiv	22,000
Pirin	Blagoevgrad	Hristo Botev	15,000
Slavia	Sofia	Ovcha Kupel	18,000
Sliven	Sliven	Hadzhi Dimitar	15,000
Spartak	Varna	Spartak	8,000
Yantra	Gabrovo	Hristo Botev	12,000

== League standings ==
Pos	Team	Pld	W	D	L	GF	GA	GD	Pts	Qualification or relegation
1	Levski Sofia (C)	30	22	6	2	76	27	+49	50	Qualification for Champions League first round
2	CSKA Sofia	30	17	8	5	66	31	+35	42	Qualification for Cup Winners' Cup first round
3	Botev Plovdiv	30	16	6	8	55	33	+22	38	Qualification for UEFA Cup first round (Note: An extra slot for the UEFA Cup was given to Bulgaria following the 1993 Polish football scandal.)
4	Lokomotiv Plovdiv	30	16	5	9	57	29	+28	37	Qualification for UEFA Cup first round
5	Lokomotiv Sofia	30	11	13	6	52	39	+13	35	
6	Etar Veliko Tarnovo	30	13	9	8	37	36	+1	35	
7	Pirin Blagoevgrad	30	13	7	10	33	32	+1	33	
8	Chernomorets Burgas	30	11	8	11	33	31	+2	30	
9	Lokomotiv G. Oryahovitsa	30	10	9	11	31	37	−6	29	
10	Beroe Stara Zagora	30	10	8	12	29	35	−6	28	
11	Yantra Gabrovo	30	10	6	14	38	52	−14	26	
12	Spartak Varna	30	8	8	14	30	48	−18	24	
13	Dobrudzha Dobrich	30	9	4	17	32	57	−25	22	
14	Slavia Sofia	30	8	5	17	39	56	−17	21	
15	Haskovo (R)	30	6	5	19	32	66	−34	17	Relegation to 1993–94 B Group
16	Sliven (R)	30	6	1	23	27	58	−31	13	Relegation to 1993–94 B Group

Source: rsssf.com
(C) Champions; (R) Relegated

== Results ==
Home \ Away	BSZ	BOT	CHB	CSK	DOB	ETA	HAS	LEV	LGO	LPL	LSO	PIR	SLA	SLI	SPV	YAN
Beroe Stara Zagora		0–0	1–1	0–1	0–1	3–1	1–0	2–2	1–0	1–2	1–4	4–0	2–1	1–0	1–0	0–1
Botev Plovdiv	1–1		3–1	4–2	4–2	1–0	3–0	2–2	2–0	1–1	1–0	4–2	4–1	2–0	3–1	4–1
Chernomorets Burgas	2–0	1–0		0–0	4–0	0–0	3–1	0–2	2–1	1–3	2–0	1–0	1–0	2–0	3–0	3–2
CSKA Sofia	2–0	3–1	2–0		5–2	1–1	3–0	2–3	3–0	1–0	1–1	1–1	4–1	3–0	4–0	6–1
Dobrudzha Dobrich	0–0	2–1	2–1	3–1		3–0	0–0	0–4	0–0	0–2	0–5	1–1	1–0	2–0	3–2	1–0
Etar Veliko Tarnovo	2–0	2–1	1–0	1–1	2–0		1–0	0–3	2–0	2–1	1–1	2–1	4–2	1–0	2–2	2–1
Haskovo	0–1	1–3	0–0	1–3	3–1	2–2		2–3	1–1	2–0	1–1	0–3	2–1	4–1	2–0	3–0
Levski Sofia	3–1	1–0	2–0	1–3	4–2	3–1	4–0		2–0	2–2	0–0	2–0	4–3	4–1	4–0	5–0
Lokomotiv G. Oryahovitsa	2–0	3–1	1–1	1–2	2–1	1–0	4–1	0–0		1–0	2–2	1–0	1–1	2–0	1–0	0–0
Lokomotiv Plovdiv	1–0	1–2	1–0	1–2	6–2	3–1	3–0	1–3	4–0		2–2	0–0	2–0	3–0	6–0	3–1
Lokomotiv Sofia	1–1	1–3	1–1	1–5	2–1	3–0	4–1	2–3	2–1	1–1		4–2	3–1	2–1	1–0	1–1
Pirin Blagoevgrad	2–0	1–1	1–0	1–0	1–0	1–1	2–1	2–1	2–2	2–0	1–0		0–1	2–1	1–0	2–0
Slavia Sofia	2–3	1–0	2–2	1–1	2–1	0–2	4–1	0–3	0–1	0–3	2–2	1–1		2–1	3–2	4–0
Sliven	2–3	0–2	2–0	1–0	3–1	1–2	5–2	0–4	1–1	1–3	0–2	2–0	0–1		1–2	3–1
Spartak Varna	0–0	1–1	1–1	0–0	1–0	1–1	3–0	1–1	3–1	1–0	1–1	0–1	3–2	2–0		3–1
Yantra Gabrovo	1–1	1–0	2–0	4–4	1–0	0–0	6–1	0–1	3–1	0–2	2–2	1–0	2–0	2–0	3–0	

Source: A PFG (in Bulgarian)
Legend: Blue = home team win; Yellow = draw; Red = away team win.

== Champions ==
Levski Sofia

Goalkeepers
(Bulgaria) Plamen Nikolov	23	(0)
(Bulgaria) Zdravko Zdravkov	10	(0)

Defenders
(Bulgaria) Valentin Dartilov	28	(0)
(Bulgaria) Gosho Ginchev	11	(0)
(Bulgaria) Krasimir Koev	17	(0)
(Bulgaria) Stoyan Pumpalov	4	(0)
(Bulgaria) Petar Hubchev	29	(1)
(Bulgaria) Kalin Bankov	1	(0)
(Bulgaria) Aleksandar Markov	17	(0)
(Bulgaria) Nikolay Iliev	14	(7)

Midfielders
(Bulgaria) Daniel Borimirov	29	(5)
(Bulgaria) Georgi Slavchev	16	(1)
(Bulgaria) Vladko Shalamanov	7	(0)
(Bulgaria) Ilian Iliev	25	(4)
(Bulgaria) Zlatko Yankov	17	(5)
(Bulgaria) Emil Mitsanski	9	(0)
(Bulgaria) Georgi Donkov	19	(4)

Forwards
(Bulgaria) Valeri Valkov	12	(0)
(Bulgaria) Plamen Getov	30	(26)
(Bulgaria) Lyubomir Nikolov	2	(0)
(Bulgaria) Velko Yotov	25	(10)
(Bulgaria) Nikolay Mitov	7	(1)
(Bulgaria) Rumen Stoyanov	5	(0)
(Bulgaria) Dimitar Trendafilov	19	(3)
(Bulgaria) Nasko Sirakov	12	(9)

Manager
(Bulgaria) Ivan Vutov

== Top scorers ==
Rank	Scorer	Club	Goals
1	(Bulgaria) Plamen Getov	Levski Sofia	26
2	(Bulgaria) Vladimir Stoyanov	Lokomotiv Sofia	21
3	(Bulgaria) Stefan Draganov	CSKA Sofia	17
3	(Bulgaria) Ayan Sadakov	Lokomotiv Plovdiv	17
5	(Bulgaria) Ivaylo Andonov	CSKA Sofia	15
6	(Bulgaria) Yordan Bozdanski	Pirin Blagoevgrad	12
7	(Bulgaria) Doncho Donev	Lokomotiv Sofia	10
7	(Bulgaria) Velko Yotov	Levski Sofia	10
7	(Romania) Petre Grigoraș	Dobrudzha	10
7	(Bulgaria) Yasen Petrov	Botev Plovdiv	10
7	(Bulgaria) Vesko Petkov	Beroe	10

- Source:1992–93 Top Goalscorers
