= Stoyan Atsarov =

Bulgarian footballer

Personal information
- Date of birth: 26 June 1969 (age 57)
- Place of birth: Gabrovo, Bulgaria
- Position: Defender

Senior career*
Years	Team	Apps	(Gls)
1988–1991	Yantra Gabrovo	76	(2)
1992	Levski Sofia	0	(0)
1993	Beroe	14	(0)
1993–1995	Etar	?	(?)
1995–1997	Slavia Sofia	43	(1)
1997–1998	Wuhan Hongjinlong	?	(?)
1998–2000	Slavia Sofia	36	(3)
2000	Spartak Pleven	?	(?)

Managerial career
- 2020: Yantra Gabrovo
- 2024: Akademik Svishtov (assistant)
- 2025: Sevlievo (assistant)
- * Club domestic league appearances and goals

Stoyan Atsarov (Bulgarian: Стоян Ацаров; born 26 June 1969) is a Bulgarian former professional footballer who played as a defender.

== Career ==
Atsarov left his mark with Slavia Sofia, making 30 appearances (the most of any "whites"' footballer) and scoring one goal during their seventh championship-winning season, which is (as of 2020) the last time the team has won an A PFG title. In 1992 Atsarov also had a short spell with Levski Sofia, featuring in just one Bulgarian Cup match for the "bluemen".

== Honours ==
Slavia Sofia

- Bulgarian League: 1995–96
- Bulgarian Cup: 1995–96
