= 1994–95 A Group =

47th completed season of top-tier football league in Bulgaria

A Group
- Season: 1994–95
- Dates: 19 August 1994 – 10 June 1995
- Champions: Levski Sofia (20th title)
- Relegated: Lokomotiv GO; Pirin; Beroe
- UEFA Cup: Levski; Botev; Slavia
- Matches: 240
- Goals: 689 (2.87 per match)
- Top goalscorer: Petar Mihtarski (24 goals)

The 1994–95 A Group was the 47th season of the A Football Group, the top Bulgarian professional league for association football clubs, since its establishment in 1948.

== Overview ==
It was contested by 16 teams, and Levski Sofia won the championship and its first three-peat. LEX Lovech, winners of the B Group in the previous season, played in A Group for the first time in their history.

== Team information ==
=== Stadia and locations ===
The following teams have ensured their participation in A Group for season 1994–95 (listed in alphabetical order):

Location of teams in 1994–95 A Group
Sofia 1994–95 A Group football clubs

Team	City	Stadium	Capacity
Beroe	Stara Zagora	Beroe	16,000
Botev	Plovdiv	Hristo Botev	18,000
CSKA	Sofia	Bulgarian Army	22,995
Dobrudzha	Dobrich	Druzhba	12,500
Etar	Veliko Tarnovo	Ivaylo	18,000
Levski	Sofia	Georgi Asparuhov	29,986
LEX	Lovech	Lovech	7,050
Lokomotiv	Gorna Oryahovitsa	Dimitar Dyulgerov	14,000
Lokomotiv	Plovdiv	Lokomotiv	24,000
Lokomotiv	Sofia	Lokomotiv	22,000
Montana	Montana	Ogosta	8,000
Neftochimic	Burgas	Lazur	18,037
Pirin	Blagoevgrad	Hristo Botev	15,000
Shumen	Shumen	Panayot Volov	24,000
Slavia	Sofia	Ovcha Kupel	18,000
Spartak	Plovdiv	Todor Diev	11,353

== League standings ==
Pos	Team	Pld	W	D	L	GF	GA	GD	Pts	Qualification or relegation
1	Levski Sofia (C)	30	26	1	3	84	15	+69	79	Qualification for UEFA Cup preliminary round
2	Lokomotiv Sofia	30	21	5	4	59	30	+29	68	Qualification for Cup Winners' Cup qualifying round
3	Botev Plovdiv	30	18	6	6	66	31	+35	60	Qualification for UEFA Cup preliminary round
4	Slavia Sofia	30	16	5	9	63	35	+28	53	Qualification for UEFA Cup preliminary round
5	CSKA Sofia	30	13	7	10	51	46	+5	46	
6	Spartak Plovdiv	30	12	7	11	33	34	−1	43	Qualification for Intertoto Cup group stage
7	Lokomotiv Plovdiv	30	13	3	14	48	38	+10	42	
8	Neftochimic Burgas	30	12	3	15	41	50	−9	39	
9	Etar Veliko Tarnovo	30	10	6	14	31	54	−23	36	Qualification for Intertoto Cup group stage
10	Shumen	30	10	6	14	33	50	−17	36	
11	LEX Lovech	30	10	6	14	25	46	−21	36	
12	Dobrudzha Dobrich	30	10	5	15	32	43	−11	35	
13	Montana	30	9	7	14	31	41	−10	34	
14	Lokomotiv G. Oryahovitsa (R)	30	10	3	17	35	53	−18	33	Relegation to 1995–96 B Group
15	Pirin Blagoevgrad (R)	30	9	3	18	30	46	−16	30	Relegation to 1995–96 B Group
16	Beroe Stara Zagora (R)	30	3	3	24	27	77	−50	12	Relegation to 1995–96 B Group

Source: rsssf.com
(C) Champions; (R) Relegated

== Results ==
Home \ Away	BSZ	BOT	CSK	DOB	ETA	LEV	LEX	LGO	LPL	LSO	MON	NEF	PIR	SHU	SLA	SPP
Beroe Stara Zagora		0–3	1–2	0–2	1–1	1–3	3–0	1–3	2–2	0–2	0–1	4–2	1–0	1–2	2–2	0–1
Botev Plovdiv	6–0		4–3	4–1	2–1	1–0	3–0	2–0	1–0	1–1	4–1	3–0	2–0	5–0	3–1	4–1
CSKA Sofia	4–2	3–2		2–1	2–2	1–7	2–0	5–1	1–0	2–2	2–0	3–0	4–1	4–1	0–0	0–0
Dobrudzha Dobrich	5–1	2–2	1–0		0–0	0–1	2–0	1–0	3–2	1–2	1–1	0–2	3–0	1–0	1–0	0–1
Etar Veliko Tarnovo	1–0	1–3	1–1	1–3		1–4	3–1	2–1	2–5	2–2	1–0	1–0	1–0	1–0	3–1	1–0
Levski Sofia	5–2	6–1	3–0	2–1	4–0		2–0	5–0	2–0	8–0	1–1	1–0	3–0	6–1	1–0	2–0
LEX Lovech	3–0	0–3	1–0	0–0	1–2	1–3		2–1	1–0	0–0	2–0	4–0	1–0	0–0	1–0	1–0
Lokomotiv G. Oryahovitsa	1–0	1–1	2–2	3–0	2–1	1–0	3–1		0–0	1–2	2–0	3–0	2–1	1–2	1–2	1–0
Lokomotiv Plovdiv	8–0	1–0	2–1	2–1	3–0	0–4	3–0	4–0		0–2	1–0	2–1	4–2	2–0	2–2	1–0
Lokomotiv Sofia	2–1	3–2	2–0	4–0	2–0	0–1	4–0	3–0	3–0		3–0	2–0	1–0	1–0	3–2	4–1
Montana	3–1	2–2	0–1	1–0	4–0	0–1	4–0	2–0	1–0	0–0		1–1	3–0	1–0	1–4	0–3
Neftochimic Burgas	2–1	1–0	1–0	3–1	3–1	1–3	1–2	2–1	2–1	1–3	4–1		3–1	4–1	3–0	2–2
Pirin Blagoevgrad	2–0	0–2	0–3	1–0	3–1	0–1	1–1	3–2	1–0	2–0	3–0	0–0		2–1	4–1	1–2
Shumen	2–1	0–0	2–2	3–0	4–0	0–2	1–1	2–1	1–0	1–3	2–1	3–2	1–1		0–0	1–0
Slavia Sofia	3–0	2–0	3–1	5–1	2–0	0–2	4–0	5–0	2–1	4–1	1–1	4–0	2–1	4–2		4–0
Spartak Plovdiv	4–1	0–0	4–0	0–0	0–0	2–1	1–1	2–1	3–2	0–2	1–1	1–0	1–0	3–0	0–3	

Source: A PFG (in Bulgarian)
Legend: Blue = home team win; Yellow = draw; Red = away team win.

== Champions ==
Levski Sofia

Goalkeepers
(Bulgaria) Plamen Nikolov	23	(0)
(Bulgaria) Zdravko Zdravkov	12	(0)
(Ukraine) Oleg Morgun	1	(0)

Defenders
(Bulgaria) Valentin Dartilov	27	(0)
(Bulgaria) Gosho Ginchev	28	(0)
(Bulgaria) Ivan Vasilev	16	(1)
(Bulgaria) Tsanko Tsvetanov	29	(1)
(Bulgaria) Aleksandar Markov	6	(0)
(Bulgaria) Emil Kremenliev	28	(1)

Midfielders
(Bulgaria) Daniel Borimirov	29	(17)
(Bulgaria) Georgi Slavchev	3	(0)
(Bulgaria) Ilian Iliev	23	(11)
(Bulgaria) Zlatko Yankov	29	(4)
(Bulgaria) Nikolay Todorov	28	(11)
(Bulgaria) Georgi Ivanov	21	(3)
(Bulgaria) Petar Kosturkov	1	(0)
(Bulgaria) Stanimir Stoilov	27	(13)
(Bulgaria) Veselin Sarbakov	2	(0)

Forwards
(Bulgaria) Kancho Yordanov	27	(3)
(Bulgaria) Plamen Timnev	11	(2)
(Bulgaria) Iliyan Simeonov	7	(2)
(Bulgaria) Dimitar Trendafilov	1	(0)
(Bulgaria) Nasko Sirakov*	10	(12)

Manager
(Bulgaria) Georgi Vasilev

- Sirakov left the club during a season.

== Top scorers ==
Rank	Scorer	Club	Goals
1	(Bulgaria) Petar Mihtarski	CSKA Sofia	24
2	(Bulgaria) Vladko Shalamanov	Slavia Sofia	22
3	(Bulgaria) Daniel Borimirov	Levski Sofia	17
4	(Bulgaria) Nasko Sirakov	Levski Sofia (12); Botev Plovdiv (4)	16
5	(Bulgaria) Nikolay Petrunov	Pirin Blagoevgrad	14
6	(Bulgaria) Stanimir Stoilov	Levski Sofia	13
7	(Bulgaria) Veliyan Parushev	Neftochimic	12
7	(Bulgaria) Valentin Ignatov	Lokomotiv GO	12
7	(Bulgaria) Boris Hvoynev	Botev Plovdiv	12
10	(Bulgaria) Georgi Donkov	Botev Plovdiv	11
10	(Bulgaria) Nikolay Todorov	Levski Sofia	11
10	(Bulgaria) Aleksandar Radev	Lokomotiv Plovdiv	11
10	(Bulgaria) Stancho Tsonev	Neftochimic	11

- Source:1994–95 Top Goalscorers

== Attendances ==
#	Club	Average
1	Neftochimik	17,500
2	Levski	10,000
3	Dobrudzha	8,308
4	Lokomotiv Plovdiv	8,000
5	Botev	7,786
6	Montana	7,115
7	Lovech	6,450
8	Shumen	6,246
9	Pirin	5,893
10	CSKA Sofia	5,692
11	Spartak	4,885
12	Beroe	4,609
13	Lokomotiv Sofia	4,346
14	Etar	4,214
15	Slavia Sofia	3,964
16	Lokomotiv GO	3,308
