= Kosturkov =

Kosturkov (Bulgarian: Костурков) is a Bulgarian masculine surname, its feminine counterpart is Kosturkova. The surname may refer to the following notable people:

- Petar Kosturkov (born 1969), Bulgarian football player and manager
- Yanko Kosturkov (born 1982), Bulgarian football player
