= Zdravko Zdravkov =

Bulgarian footballer

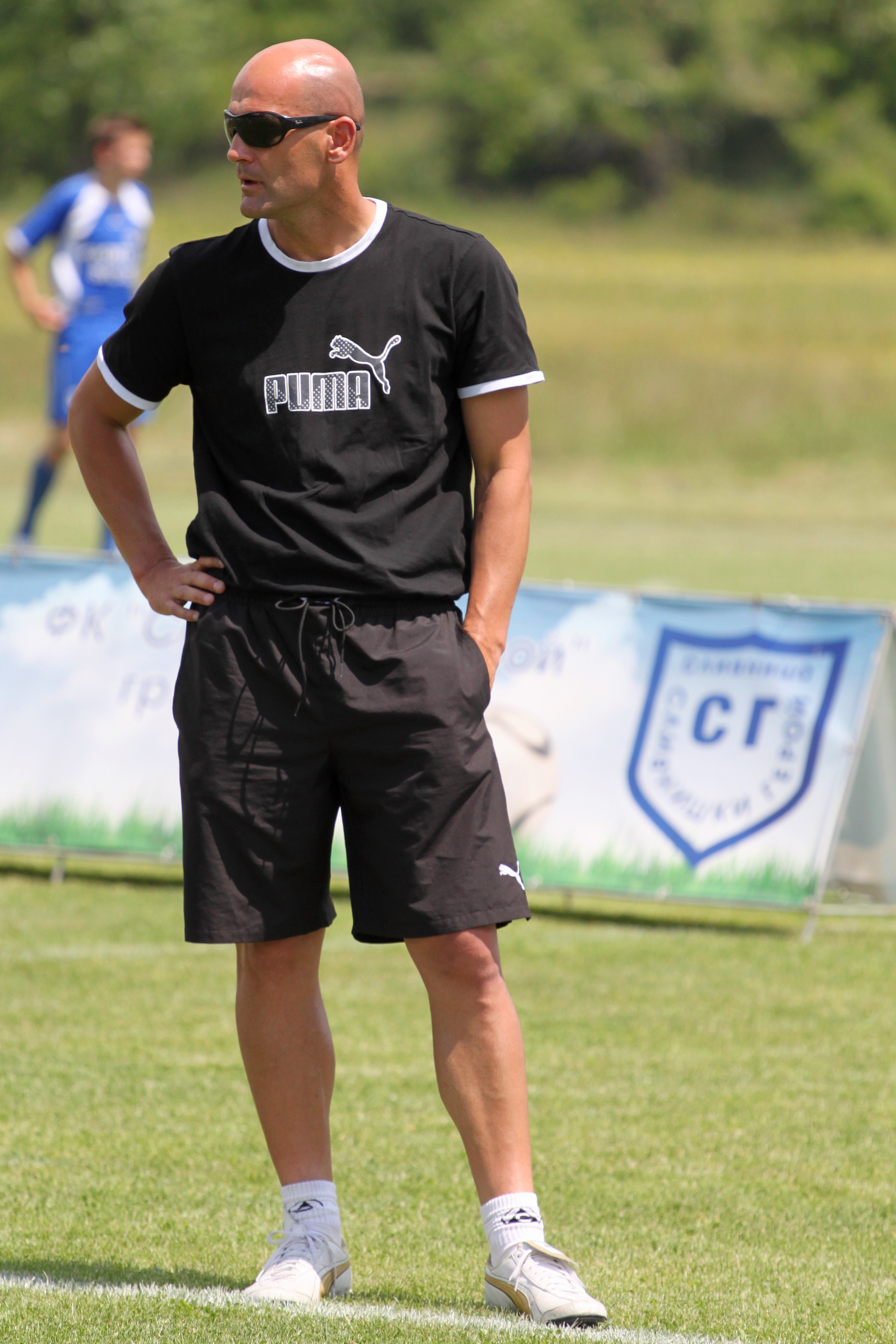
- Zdravkov in 2011

Personal information
- Full name: Zdravko Stoyanov Zdravkov
- Date of birth: 4 October 1970 (age 56)
- Place of birth: Sofia, Bulgaria
- Height: 1.87 m (6 ft 1 1/2 in)
- Position: Goalkeeper

Team information
- Current team: Ludogorets Razgrad (goalkeeping coach)

Senior career*
Years	Team	Apps	(Gls)
1988–1993	Levski Sofia	64	(0)
1993–1994	Etar Veliko Tarnovo	19	(0)
1994–1995	Levski Sofia	11	(0)
1995–1997	Slavia Sofia	62	(0)
1997–1999	İstanbulspor	47	(0)
1999–2000	Adanaspor	24	(0)
2000–2002	İstanbulspor	55	(0)
2002	Cherno More	12	(0)
2003	İstanbulspor	18	(0)
2004	Litex Lovech	14	(0)
2004–2007	Çaykur Rizespor	93	(0)
Total		419	(0)

International career
1996–2005	Bulgaria	70	(0)

Managerial career
- 2012–2013: Levski Sofia (assistant)
- 2013–2014: Slavia Sofia (assistant)
- 2015: Interclube (goalkeeping coach)
- 2016–2018: Hangzhou Greentown (goalkeeping coach)
- 2017: Hangzhou Greentown (caretaker)
- 2019–2023: Ludogorets Razgrad (goalkeeping coach)
- 2023–2025: Bulgaria (goalkeeping coach)
- 2023–: Ludogorets Razgrad (goalkeeping coach)
- * Club domestic league appearances and goals

Zdravko Stoyanov Zdravkov (Bulgarian: Здравко Стоянов Здравков; born 4 October 1970 in Sofia) is a former Bulgarian football goalkeeper. He ended his career at the end of 2006–07 season.

== Club career ==
On the club level, Zdravkov has played for Levski Sofia (1989–1995), Istanbulspor (1997–1999 and 2000–2002), Adanaspor (1999–2000), Cherno More (2002–2003), Litex Lovech (2003–2004) and Çaykur Rizespor (2004–2007).

December 2002 until January 2003, Zdravkov spent a trial period with Arsenal F.C., but did not eventually sign with the then-reigning FA Premier League champions.

== International career ==
For Bulgaria, Zdravkov has been capped 70 times. He made his debut on 24 April 1996, against Slovakia in Trnava. He was the starting goalkeeper for his country at the Euro 1996, 1998 World Cup and Euro 2004, succeeding Borislav Mihaylov as the custodian of the Bulgarian team.

Halfway through the France World Cup in 1998, with Bulgaria having played two games (0–0 against Paraguay and a 0–1 loss to Nigeria), Zdravkov was ranked as the 2nd best goalkeeper in form. Although he went on to concede 6 goals in Bulgaria's loss to Spain in the next game, Zdravkov was an exceptional performer at the World Cup.

Six years later, at UEFA Euro 2004, Zdravkov's age began to show, Bulgaria lost 0–5 to Sweden, 0–2 to Denmark and 1–2 to Italy, and this was to be Zdravkov's final tournament as national team goalkeeper.

== Personal ==
Zdravkov participated in the third season of Survivor BG, in Panama, but was evacuated due to serious health problems. He is married to Irena and they have three sons - Ivan, Yoan and Pavel.

== Honours ==
Levski Sofia

- A Group: 1992–93, 1994–95
- Bulgarian Cup: 1990–91, 1991–92

Slavia Sofia

- A Group: 1995–96
- Bulgarian Cup: 1995–96

Litex Lovech

- Bulgarian Cup: 2003–04
