= Diyan Angelov =

Bulgarian footballer

Personal information
- Full name: Diyan Donchev Angelov
- Date of birth: October 17, 1964 (age 62)
- Place of birth: Razgrad, Bulgaria
- Height: 5 ft 11 in (1.80 m)
- Position: Midfielder

Senior career*
Years	Team	Apps	(Gls)
1981–1990	Dunav Ruse	236	(28)
1990–1991	Slavia Sofia	36	(12)
1991–1993	Osasuna	15	(1)
1993–1994	Levski Sofia	13	(1)
1994–1995	Lokomotiv Sofia	36	(6)
1996–1997	Slavia Sofia	25	(3)
1997	Richmond Kickers	18	(2)
1998	Hampton Roads Mariners	23	(5)
Total		402	(58)

International career
1991–1995	Bulgaria	3	(0)
- * Club domestic league appearances and goals

Diyan Donchev Angelov (Bulgarian: Диян Дончев Ангелов) is a retired Bulgarian association football player who played professionally in Bulgaria, Spain and the United States.

== Football career ==
In 1981, Angelov became a professional with FC Dunav Ruse. Over the years, he played for several teams in Bulgaria. In October 1991, CA Osasuna paid 20 million pesetas for Angelov. His time with Osasuna was a disappointment and in November 1993, he received a free transfer to PFC Levski Sofia. In 1997, he moved to the United States and signed with the Richmond Kickers in the USISL A-League. He was an All Star that season. In 1998, he finished his career with the Hampton Roads Mariners.

== Honours ==
Levski Sofia

- Bulgarian League: 1993–94
- Bulgarian Cup: 1993–94

Lokomotiv Sofia

- Bulgarian Cup: 1994–95

Slavia Sofia

- Bulgarian League: 1995–96
- Bulgarian Cup: 1995–96
