= Stoyan Kotsev =

Bulgarian footballer and manager

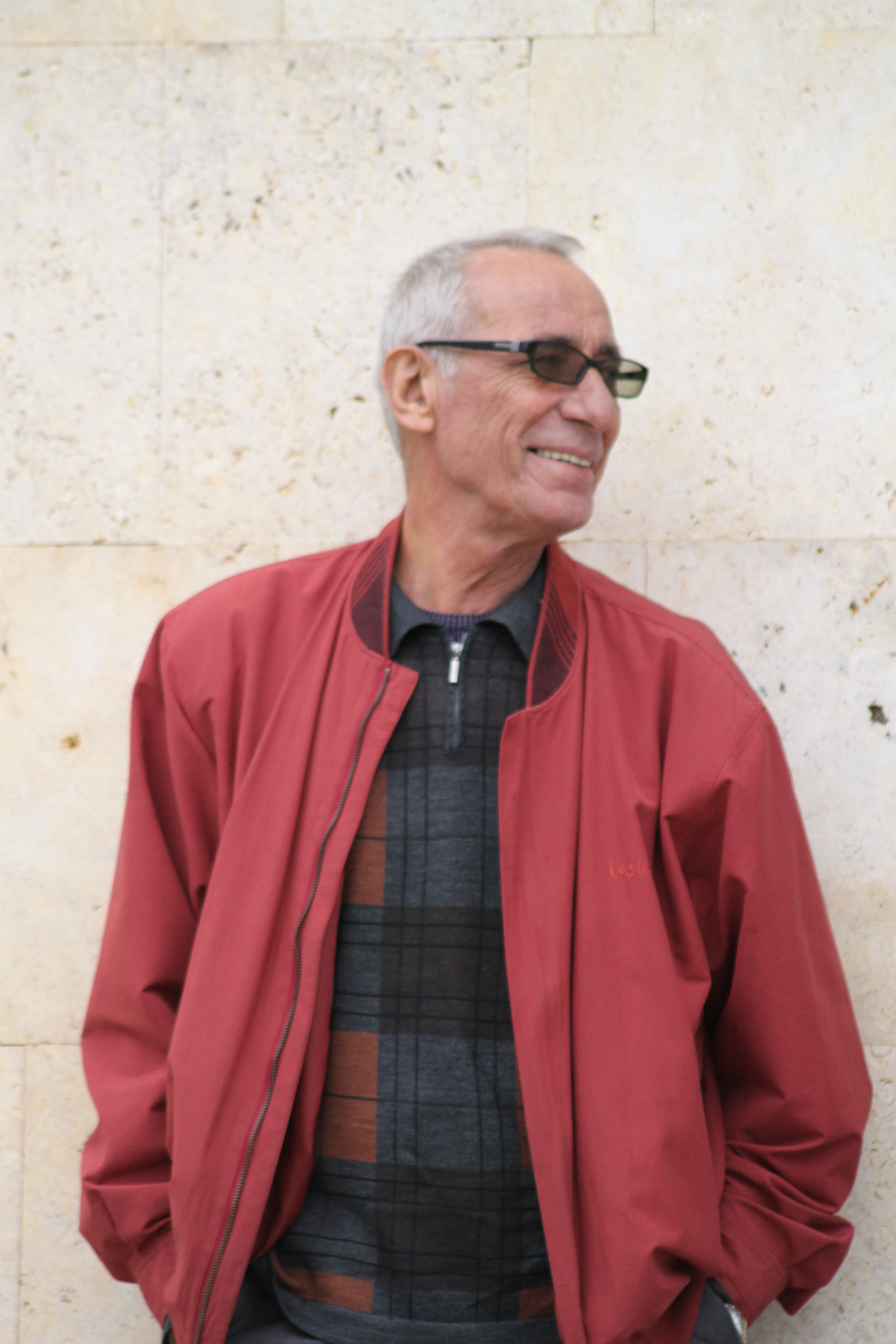

Personal information
- Date of birth: 29 January 1945
- Place of birth: Botevgrad, Bulgaria
- Date of death: 22 August 2012 (aged 67)
- Place of death: Sofia, Bulgaria
- Position: Winger

Senior career*
Years	Team	Apps	(Gls)
1963–1967	Balkan Botevgrad		
1967–1973	Slavia Sofia	161	(32)
1973–1976	Etar	87	(31)
1976–1978	Balkan Botevgrad		

International career
1969	Bulgaria	3	(0)

Managerial career
- 1979–1981: Balkan Botevgrad
- 1981–1982: Akademik Svishtov
- 1982–1983: Chumerna Elena
- 1983–1984: Pavlikeni
- 1984–1985: Hemus Troyan
- 1989–1991: Slavia Sofia (assistant)
- 1992: Slavia Sofia
- 1994–1996: Slavia Sofia
- 1997: Slavia Sofia
- 1998–1999: Slavia Sofia
- 2002: Bulgaria U21
- 2003: Shannxi Guoli
- 2004: Dobrudzha Dobrich
- 2005–2007: Marek Dupnitsa
- 2008: Marek Dupnitsa
- 2008–2010: Balkan Botevgrad
- * Club domestic league appearances and goals

Stoyan Kotsev (Bulgarian: Стоян Коцев; 29 January 1945 – 22 August 2012) was a Bulgarian football manager and player, who played as a winger.

== Honours ==
=== Manager ===
Slavia Sofia

- Bulgarian League: 1995–96
- Bulgarian Cup: 1995–96
