= Aleksandar Markov =

Bulgarian footballer

Personal information
- Date of birth: 17 August 1961 (age 65)
- Place of birth: Sofia, Bulgaria
- Height: 1.74 m (5 ft 9 in)
- Position: Defender

Senior career*
Years	Team	Apps	(Gls)
1981–1985	Lokomotiv Sofia	87	(2)
1985–1988	Spartak Pleven	63	(1)
1988–1991	Slavia Sofia	50	(1)
1991–1996	Levski Sofia	66	(0)
1996–1998	Spartak Pleven		
1998–1999	Hampton Roads Mariners		
1999	Atlanta Silverbacks	10	(0)
Total		76	(0)

International career
1983–1993	Bulgaria	20	(0)
- * Club domestic league appearances and goals

Aleksandar Markov (Bulgarian: Александър Марков; born 17 August 1961) is a Bulgarian former footballer who played as a defender. He played for Bulgaria at the 1986 FIFA World Cup, making two appearances. He also played in the qualifying campaigns for the 1986 and 1994 tournaments.

In club football, Markov spent most of his career in his native country, making 66 appearances for Levski Sofia. He finished his career with short spells at Hampton Roads Mariners and Atlanta Silverbacks in the United States.

== Honours ==
=== Club ===
Levski Sofia

- A PFG (3): 1992–93, 1993–94, 1994–95
- Bulgarian Cup (2): 1991–92, 1993–94
