= Zlatomir Zagorčić =

Bulgarian footballer

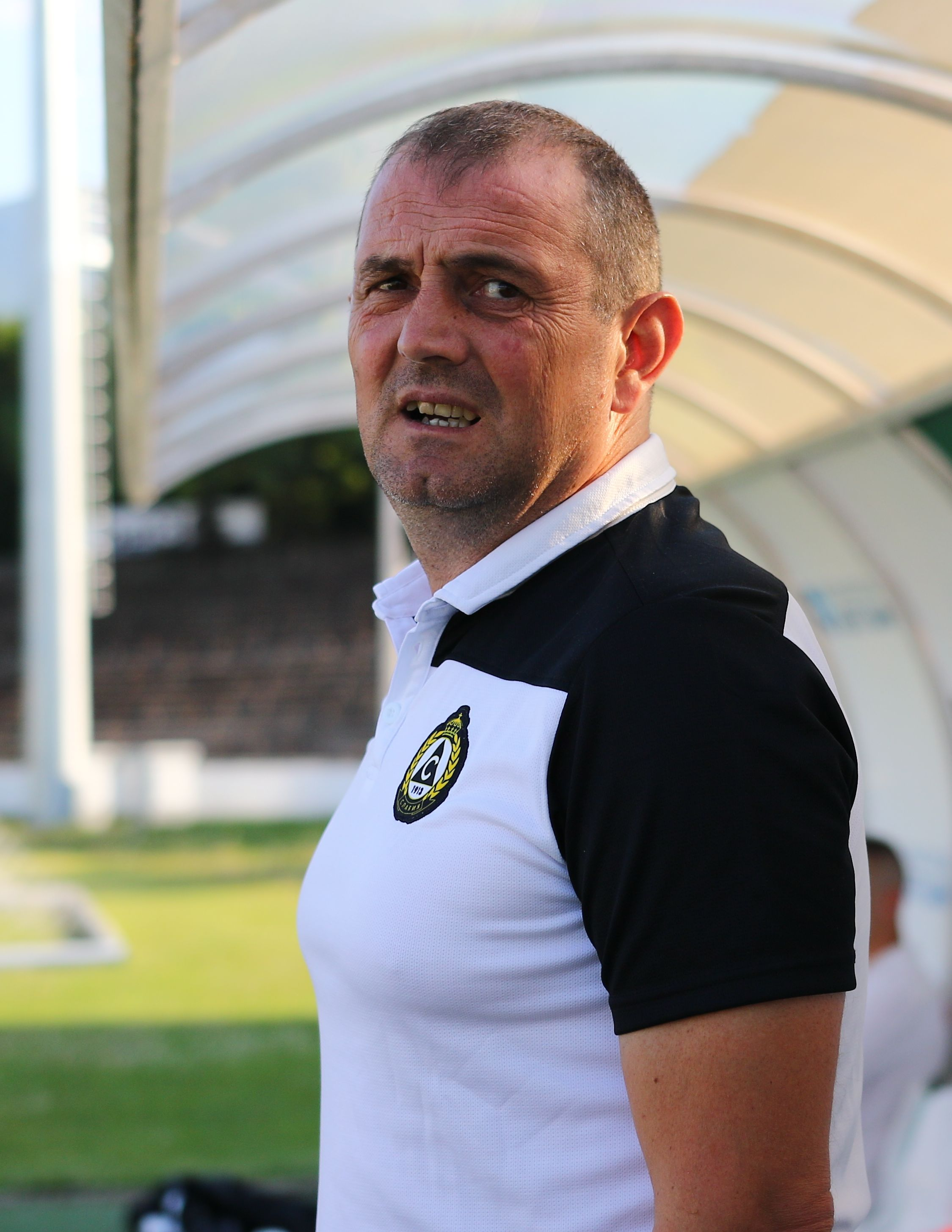
- Zagorčić with Slavia Sofia in 2019

Personal information
- Date of birth: 15 June 1971 (age 55)
- Place of birth: Novi Sad, SR Serbia, Yugoslavia
- Height: 1.82 m (5 ft 11 1/2 in)
- Position: Centre back

Youth career
- Vojvodina

Senior career*
Years	Team	Apps	(Gls)
1990–1997	Novi Sad	128	(5)
1997–1999	Litex Lovech	54	(1)
1999	→ Adanaspor (loan)	3	(0)
2000–2002	Lugano	65	(0)
2002–2005	Litex Lovech	46	(2)
2005	Novi Sad	6	(0)
Total		302	(8)

International career
1998–2004	Bulgaria	23	(0)

Managerial career
- 2012: Vojvodina
- 2013–2014: Litex Lovech
- 2014–2015: Donji Srem
- 2015: Vojvodina
- 2017–2020: Slavia Sofia
- 2021–2023: Slavia Sofia
- 2023–2025: Slavia Sofia
- * Club domestic league appearances and goals

Zlatomir Zagorčić (Serbian Cyrillic: Златомир Загорчић, Bulgarian: Златомир Загорчич; born 15 June 1971) is a professional football manager and former player. Born in Yugoslavia, he represented Bulgaria at international level.

== Playing career ==
Nicknamed Zagi, Zagorčić played as a defender and began his career with FK Novi Sad. In 1997 he moved to Bulgarian club Litex Lovech, where he won two Bulgarian A Group titles.

In this time Zagorčić made his debut for the Bulgaria national team under manager Hristo Bonev prior to the 1998 World Cup. He was a member of the Bulgarian 2004 European Football Championship squad, where he played his final international game against Italy. Zagorčić earned a total of 23 caps (no goals).

Zagorčić retired from playing professional football in November 2005.

== Managerial career ==
In July 2006 Zagorčić joined the coaching staff of his former club Litex Lovech, as he was appointed assistant to manager Ljupko Petrović. In the summer of 2013, he was appointed as manager of Litex, replacing Hristo Stoichkov, who had stepped down as head coach. He was released from his duties in late March 2014.

On 11 May 2017, Zagorčić was appointed as a manager of Slavia Sofia after the bad form of the team under Vladimir Ivanov. In May 2018, he led the team to a victory in the Bulgarian Cup, the first one in 22 years. During the 2019–20 season Slavia finished in third place in the league and qualified to the UEFA Europa League. Zagorčić parted ways with the team by mutual consent on 1 September 2020.

== Honours ==
Litex Lovech

- Bulgarian A Group: 1997–98, 1998–99
- Bulgarian Cup: 2003–04

=== Manager ===
Slavia Sofia

- Bulgarian Cup: 2017–18
