= Kiril Kachamanov =

Bulgarian footballer

Personal information
- Date of birth: 20 April 1965 (age 61)
- Position: Centre-back

Senior career*
| Years | Team | Apps | (Gls) |
| 1987–1990 | CSKA Sofia | 15 | (0) |
| 1987–1988 | → Minyor Pernik (loan) | 23 | (0) |
| 1990–1997 | Slavia Sofia | 151 | (2) |

Managerial career
- 1998–2000: Slavia Sofia (assistant)
- 2000–2001: Slavia Sofia
- 2004–2005: Bulgaria U17
- 2005–2006: Pirin 1922
- 2006–2007: Balkan Botevgrad
- * Club domestic league appearances and goals

Kiril Kachamanov (born 20 April 1965) is a Bulgarian former professional footballer who played as a defender.

== Honours ==
CSKA Sofia

- Bulgarian League (3): 1986–87, 1988–89, 1989–90
- Bulgarian Cup: 1989–90

Slavia Sofia

- Bulgarian League: 1995–96
- Bulgarian Cup: 1995–96
