= Mihail Zahariev =

Bulgarian footballer

Personal information
- Full name: Mihail Stoyanov Zahariev
- Date of birth: 12 December 1972 (age 53)
- Place of birth: Bulgaria
- Position: Defender

Senior career*
Years	Team	Apps	(Gls)
1990–1991	Levski Sofia	2	(0)
- * Club domestic league appearances and goals

Mihail Zahariev (Bulgarian: Михаил Захариев; born 12 December 1972) is a Bulgarian former professional footballer who is currently youth coach at Levski Sofia.

== Career ==
A natural defender, Zahariev is mainly known for his time with Slavia Sofia and has also represented Levski Sofia. He was champion of Bulgaria and in addition to that won a Bulgarian Cup with Slavia Sofia. In 2013, Zahariev was among the footballers who received an honorary medal as part of the commemorations that marked a century since the founding of the "whites".
