= Jordan Semedo =

Cape Verdan footballer (born 2003)

Personal information
- Full name: Jordan Semedo Varela
- Date of birth: 15 January 2003 (age 23)
- Place of birth: Nice, France
- Height: 1.75 m (5 ft 9 in)
- Position: Left-back

Team information
- Current team: Slavia Sofia
- Number: 20

Youth career
- 2009–2017: Cavigal Nice Sports
- 2017–2021: AS Monaco

Senior career*
Years	Team	Apps	(Gls)
2021–2023	AS Monaco II	21	(1)
2023–2024	AS Monaco	0	(0)
2023–2024	→ Cercle Brugge (loan)	14	(0)
2024–	Slavia Sofia	52	(3)

International career^{‡}
2021–2022	France U19	11	(0)
2022–2023	France U20	11	(0)
2025–	Cape Verde	2	(0)
- * Club domestic league appearances and goals as of 10 November 2026 ‡ National team caps and goals as of 13:56, 30 May 2025 (UTC)

Jordan Semedo Varela (Portuguese: [ˈʒɔɾ.dɐn sɨ.ˈme.du vɐ.ˈɾɛ.lɐ]; born 15 January 2003) is a professional footballer who plays as a left-back for Bulgarian First League club Slavia Sofia. Born in France, he plays for the Cape Verde national team.

== Club career ==
Born in Nice, Semedo began his youth career playing for local team Cavigal Nice Sports before joining the AS Monaco academy in 2017.

In June 2023, Semedo joined Cercle Brugge on a one-year loan deal. He made his professional debut on 30 July 2023, in Cercle Brugge's 0–1 defeat against Royal Antwerp.

== International career ==
Born in France, Semedo is of Cape Verdean descent and holds dual-citizenship. In 2022, he participated in the 2022 UEFA European Under-19 Championship with France under-19s. He started in three out of four matches, as France was defeated by Israel in the semi-finals.

In May 2023, he was selected with France under-20s for the FIFA World Cup. Semedo appeared as the starting left-back in all three group stages matches but France failed to advance to the knockout stage.

In May 2025, Semedo was called up to the Cape Verde national team for a set of friendlies. He debuted with Cape Verde in a friendly 1–1 tie with Malaysia on 29 May 2025.

On 10 March 2026, Semedo received approval from FIFA to switch his international allegiance to play official matches for the Cape Verde national team.
