= 1993–94 B Group =

B Group
- Season: 1993–94
- Champions: LEX Lovech (North); Neftochimic Burgas (South)
- Promoted: LEX Lovech; Neftochimic Burgas; Montana; Spartak Plovdiv
- Relegated: Botev Vratsa; Lokomotiv Mezdra; Bdin Vidin; Levski Lom; Chernolomets Popovo; Vihren Sandanski; Minyor Pernik; Yambol; Rozova Dolina Kazanlak

The 1994–95 B Group was the 38th season of the Bulgarian B Football Group, the second tier of the Bulgarian football league system.

A total of 32 teams contested the league: 16 in the North B Group and 16 in the South B Group. LEX Lovech finished top of the North Group and Neftochimic Burgas finished top of the South Group.

== North B Group ==
Pos	Team	Pld	W	D	L	GF	GA	GD	Pts	Promotion or relegation
1	LEX Lovech (P)	26	18	4	4	61	20	+41	58	Promotion to 1994–95 A Group
2	Montana (P)	26	16	5	5	38	19	+19	53	Promotion to 1994–95 A Group
3	Spartak Pleven	26	14	6	6	36	20	+16	48	
4	Svetkavitsa Targovishte	26	11	8	7	30	28	+2	41	
5	Dorostol Silistra	26	11	3	12	26	30	−4	36	
6	Korabostroitel Ruse	26	10	4	12	39	29	+10	34	
7	Akademik Svishtov	26	11	1	14	27	31	−4	34	
8	Ovech Provadia	26	10	3	13	27	36	−9	33	
9	Dunav Ruse	26	9	6	11	29	32	−3	33	
10	Storgozia Pleven	26	7	11	8	26	29	−3	32	
11	Botev Novi Pazar	26	9	4	13	34	41	−7	31	
12	Botev Vratsa (R)	26	8	4	14	24	42	−18	28	Relegation to 1994–95 V Group
13	Lokomotiv Mezdra (R)	26	8	4	14	22	39	−17	28	Relegation to 1994–95 V Group
14	Bdin Vidin (R)	26	7	3	16	24	47	−23	24	Relegation to 1994–95 V Group
x	Levski Lom (D)	15	8	1	6	21	20	+1	25	Withdraw from the league
x	Chernolomets Popovo (D)	15	3	1	11	12	31	−19	10	Withdraw from the league

Source: todor66.com
Rules for classification: 1) points; 2) goal difference; 3) number of goals scored.
(D) Disqualified; (P) Promoted; (R) Relegated

== South B Group ==
Pos	Team	Pld	W	D	L	GF	GA	GD	Pts	Promotion or relegation
1	Neftochimic Burgas (P)	30	19	7	4	54	20	+34	64	Promotion to 1994–95 A Group
2	Spartak Plovdiv (P)	30	18	6	6	55	24	+31	60	Promotion to 1994–95 A Group
3	Haskovo	30	16	3	11	51	36	+15	51	
4	Septemvri Sofia	30	15	5	10	51	40	+11	50	
5	Maritsa Plovdiv	30	14	3	13	52	45	+7	45	
6	Rilski Sportist	30	14	3	13	52	49	+3	45	
7	Metalik Sopot	30	12	6	12	27	36	−9	42	
8	Nesebar	30	11	7	12	29	30	−1	40	
9	Pirin Gotse Delchev	30	12	4	14	43	44	−1	40	
10	Hebar Pazardzhik	30	11	6	13	30	47	−17	39	
11	Sliven	30	11	5	14	34	50	−16	38	
12	Belasitsa Petrich	30	11	5	14	35	33	+2	38	
13	Vihren Sandanski (R)	30	12	2	16	35	36	−1	38	Relegation to 1994–95 V Group
14	Minyor Pernik (R)	30	12	1	17	37	44	−7	37	Relegation to 1994–95 V Group
15	Yambol (R)	30	10	5	15	30	41	−11	35	Relegation to 1994–95 V Group
16	Rozova Dolina Kazanlak (R)	30	7	2	21	27	67	−40	23	Relegation to 1994–95 V Group

Source: todor66.com
Rules for classification: 1) points; 2) goal difference; 3) number of goals scored.
(P) Promoted; (R) Relegated
