= 1999–2000 B Group =

Season of the Bulgarian B Football Group

Bulgarian B Group
- Season: 1999–2000
- Champions: Cherno More
- Promoted: Cherno More; Hebar-Iskar
- Relegated: Etar; Antibiotic-Ludogorets; Maritsa; Beroe 2000
- Matches: 240
- Goals: 618 (2.58 per match)

The 1999–2000 B Group was the 44th season of the Bulgarian B Football Group, the second tier of the Bulgarian football league system. A total of 16 teams contested the league.

Cherno More Varna and Hebar-Iskar Pazardzhik were promoted to Bulgarian A Group. Etar Veliko Tarnovo, Antibiotic-Ludogorets Razgrad, Maritsa Plovdiv and Beroe 2000 Kazanlak were relegated.

== League table ==
Pos	Team	Pld	W	D	L	GF	GA	GD	Pts	Promotion or relegation
1	Cherno More Varna (P)	30	23	1	6	59	27	+32	70	Promotion to 2000–01 A Group
2	Spartak Pleven	30	21	4	5	57	32	+25	67	Qualification for Promotion play-off
3	Hebar-Iskar Pazardzhik (P)	30	17	5	8	51	31	+20	56	Qualification for Promotion play-off
4	Dunav Ruse	30	15	5	10	43	35	+8	50	
5	Botev Vratsa	30	14	3	13	48	48	0	45	
6	Vidima-Rakovski	30	12	5	13	40	40	0	41	
7	Lokomotiv Plovdiv	30	12	3	15	28	38	−10	39	
8	Metalurg Radomir	30	11	5	14	29	33	−4	38	
9	Septemvri Sofia	30	10	8	12	44	49	−5	38	
10	Svetkavitsa Targovishte	30	11	5	14	35	43	−8	38	
11	Kremikovtsi	30	10	8	12	35	35	0	38	
12	Haskovo	30	11	4	15	36	43	−7	37	
13	Etar Veliko Tarnovo (R)	30	10	7	13	32	38	−6	37	Relegation to 2000–01 V Group
14	Antibiotic-Ludogorets Razgrad (R)	30	11	4	15	31	36	−5	37	Relegation to 2000–01 V Group
15	Maritsa Plovdiv (R)	30	9	6	15	29	39	−10	33	Relegation to 2000–01 V Group
16	Beroe 2000 Kazanlak (R)	30	3	7	20	21	51	−30	16	Relegation to 2000–01 V Group

Source: rsssf.com
Rules for classification: 1) points; 2) goal difference; 3) number of goals scored.
(P) Promoted; (R) Relegated

== Promotion play-off ==
14 June 2000
18:30 EEST

Dobrudzha Dobrich	0–2	Hebar-Iskar Pazardzhik

14 June 2000
18:30 EEST

Olimpik-Beroe	1–0	Spartak Pleven
