= Stefan Kolev =

Bulgarian footballer and manager

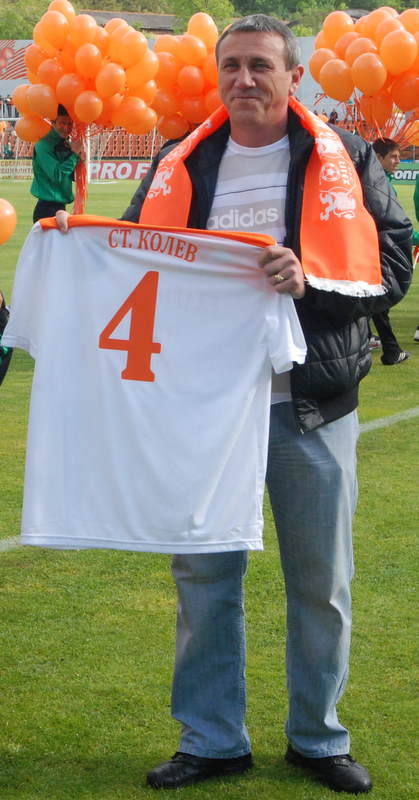

Personal information
- Date of birth: 11 October 1966 (age 60)
- Place of birth: Sofia, Bulgaria
- Position: Defender

Team information
- Current team: Bulgaria U15 (manager)

Youth career
- 1976–1985: Levski Sofia

Senior career*
| Years | Team | Apps | (Gls) |
| 1986–1988 | Levski Sofia | 6 | (0) |
| 1986–1987 | → Akademik Svishtov (loan) | 17 | (0) |
| 1988 | Spartak Varna | 4 | (0) |
| 1989 | Etar | 4 | (0) |
| 1989–1990 | Lokomotiv GO | 29 | (0) |
| 1990–1991 | Yantra Gabrovo | 21 | (0) |
| 1991–1992 | CSKA Sofia | 25 | (0) |
| 1993–1994 | Shumen | | |
| 1994–1996 | Slavia Sofia | 55 | (2) |
| 1996–1999 | Litex Lovech | 54 | (1) |
| 2000 | Slavia Sofia | 9 | (0) |
| 2000–2001 | Spartak Pleven | | |

Managerial career
- 2005–2007: Urvich Pancharevo
- 2007–2010: Slavia Sofia (youth)
- 2010–2011: Sportist Svoge
- 2012–2015: Levski Sofia (youth)
- 2016–2017: Spartak Pleven
- 2018–: Bulgaria U15
- * Club domestic league appearances and goals

Stefan Kolev (Bulgarian: Стефан Колев; Born 11 October 1966) is a Bulgarian football manager of Bulgaria U15, former association football defender and the only player to win five BulgarianA Group titles with four clubs – Levski Sofia in 1988, CSKA Sofia in 1992, Slavia Sofia in 1996 and Litex Lovech twice, in 1998 and 1999.
