= Anton Dimitrov (footballer, born 1970) =

Bulgarian footballer

Personal information
- Date of birth: 12 August 1970 (age 56)
- Position: Forward

Senior career*
Years	Team	Apps	(Gls)
1987–1993	CSKA Sofia		
1993–1995	Shumen		
1995–1997	Slavia Sofia		
- * Club domestic league appearances and goals

Anton Dimitrov (born 12 August 1970) is a retired Bulgarian football striker.
