= 1995–96 B Group =

Fortieth season of the Bulgarian B Football Group

Bulgarian B Group
- Season: 1995–96
- Champions: Maritsa
- Promoted: Maritsa; Minyor; Spartak Pleven
- Relegated: Han Asparuh; Belasitsa; Dunav; Beroe; Storgozia; Arda
- Matches: 380
- Goals: 962 (2.53 per match)
- Top goalscorer: (Bulgaria) Kiril Vasilev (22 goals)

The 1995–96 B Group was the 40th season of the Bulgarian B Football Group, the second tier of the Bulgarian football league system. A total of 20 teams contested the league.

== League table ==
Locations of the 1995–96 Bulgarian B Group teams

Pos	Team	Pld	W	D	L	GF	GA	GD	Pts	Promotion or relegation
1	Maritsa Plovdiv (P)	38	23	7	8	68	27	+41	76	Promotion to 1996–97 A Group
2	Minyor Pernik (P)	38	24	3	11	60	31	+29	75	Promotion to 1996–97 A Group
3	Spartak Pleven (P)	38	21	5	12	59	39	+20	68	Promotion to 1996–97 A Group
4	Pirin Blagoevgrad	38	20	8	10	56	32	+24	68	
5	Akademik Sofia	38	18	8	12	56	49	+7	62	
6	Cherno More Varna	38	18	6	14	51	46	+5	60	
7	Olimpik Galata	38	16	9	13	48	42	+6	57	
8	Haskovo	38	16	8	14	58	49	+9	56	
9	Chardafon Gabrovo	38	17	5	16	40	34	+6	56	
10	Septemvri Sofia	38	17	4	17	61	52	+9	55	
11	Chirpan	38	16	7	15	41	38	+3	55	
12	Lokomotiv Ruse	38	16	7	15	32	51	−19	55	
13	Lokomotiv G. Oryahovitsa	38	16	6	16	49	46	+3	54	
14	Hebar Pazardzhik	38	16	5	17	57	51	+6	53	
15	Han Asparuh Isperih (P)	38	14	9	15	47	48	−1	51	Relegation to 1996–97 V Group
16	Belasitsa Petrich (R)	38	13	3	22	38	57	−19	42	Relegation to 1996–97 V Group
17	Dunav Ruse (R)	38	12	6	20	38	66	−28	42	Relegation to 1996–97 V Group
18	Beroe Stara Zagora (R)	38	10	6	22	38	67	−29	36	Relegation to 1996–97 V Group
19	Storgozia Pleven (R)	38	8	6	24	40	70	−30	30	Relegation to 1996–97 V Group
20	Arda Kardzhali (R)	38	6	8	24	22	64	−42	26	Relegation to 1996–97 V Group

Source: 1995–96 B Group season futbolbg.dir.bg
Rules for classification: 1) points; 2) goal difference; 3) number of goals scored.
(P) Promoted; (R) Relegated

== Top scorers ==
Rank	Scorer	Club	Goals
1	(Bulgaria) Kiril Vasilev	Haskovo	22
