= Petar Tsvetanov =

Bulgarian footballer

Personal information
- Date of birth: 12 May 1972 (age 54)
- Place of birth: Sofia
- Position: Defender

Senior career*
Years	Team	Apps	(Gls)
–1994	PFC CSKA Sofia		
1994–1995	PFC Haskovo		
1995–1999	PFC Slavia Sofia		
1999–2003	Akratitos FC		
2003–2007	Thrasyvoulos F.C.		
- * Club domestic league appearances and goals

Petar Tsvetanov (born 30 August 1968) is a retired Bulgarian football defender.
