= Kostadin Gerganchev =

Bulgarian footballer and coach

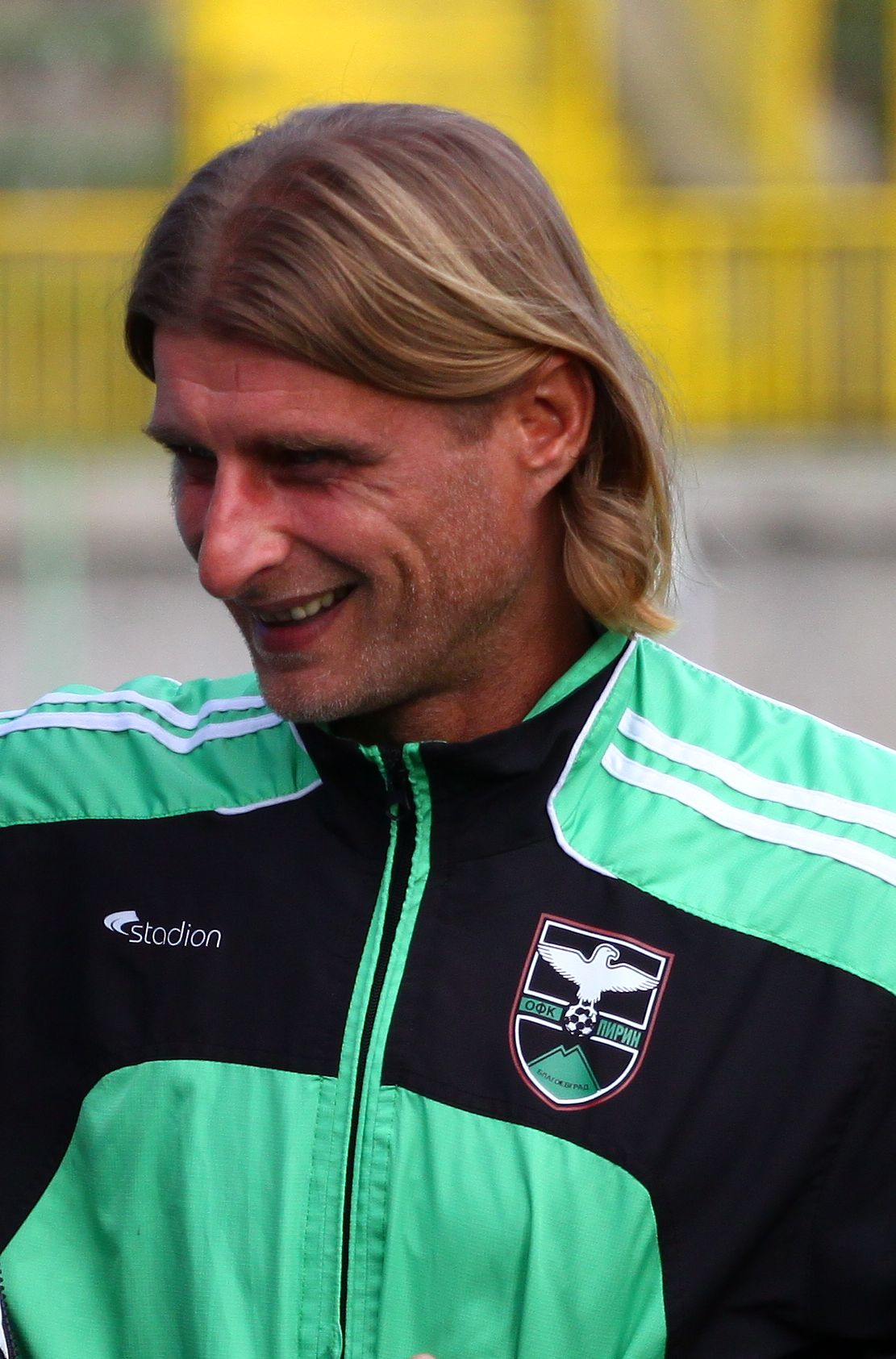

Kostadin Assenov Gerganchev (Bulgarian: Костадин Асенов Герганчев; born 25 October 1971) is a Bulgarian former football player, who played as a midfielder, and a coach.

He was born on 25 October 1971, in Blagoevgrad, Bulgaria.

He played for Pirin, Spartak (Plovdiv), Makedonska Slava, Sasa (Makedonska Kamenica) (Macedonia), FK Apolonia Fier (Albania) and Ptolemaida (Greece). Since the fall of 2006 he has been playing for Velbazhd Kyustendil. Finalist for the national cup in 1992 and 1994 with Pirin Blagoevgrad.
