= Alyosha Andonov =

Bulgarian football head coach

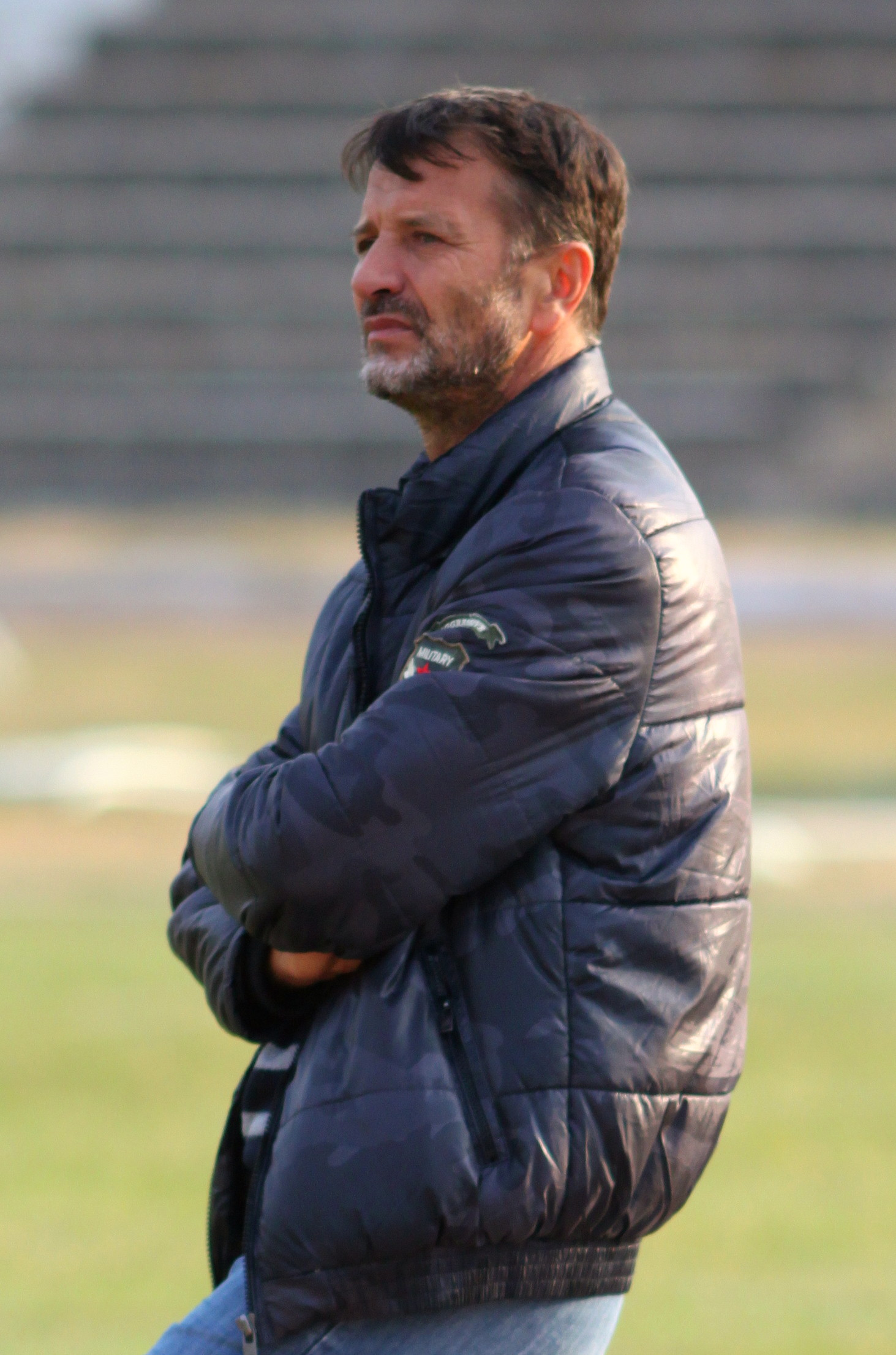

Personal information
- Date of birth: 31 January 1961 (age 65)
- Place of birth: Sofia, Bulgaria

Alyosha Andonov (Bulgarian: Альошa Андонов; born 31 January 1961) is a Bulgarian football head coach who is a former coach of PFC Belasitsa Petrich.

== Biography ==
Andonov graduated from the Higher Training School of NSA. He has been a professional player for PFC CSKA Sofia, PFC Belasitsa Petrich in the BG First division, PFC Dunav Rousse, PFC Beroe, "Minior" (Pernik), and FC Lübeck (Germany). He used to coach FC Novi Iskar, and was head coach of FC Minior (Bobov dol).
