= Vladimir Ivanov (footballer, born 1973) =

Bulgarian footballer

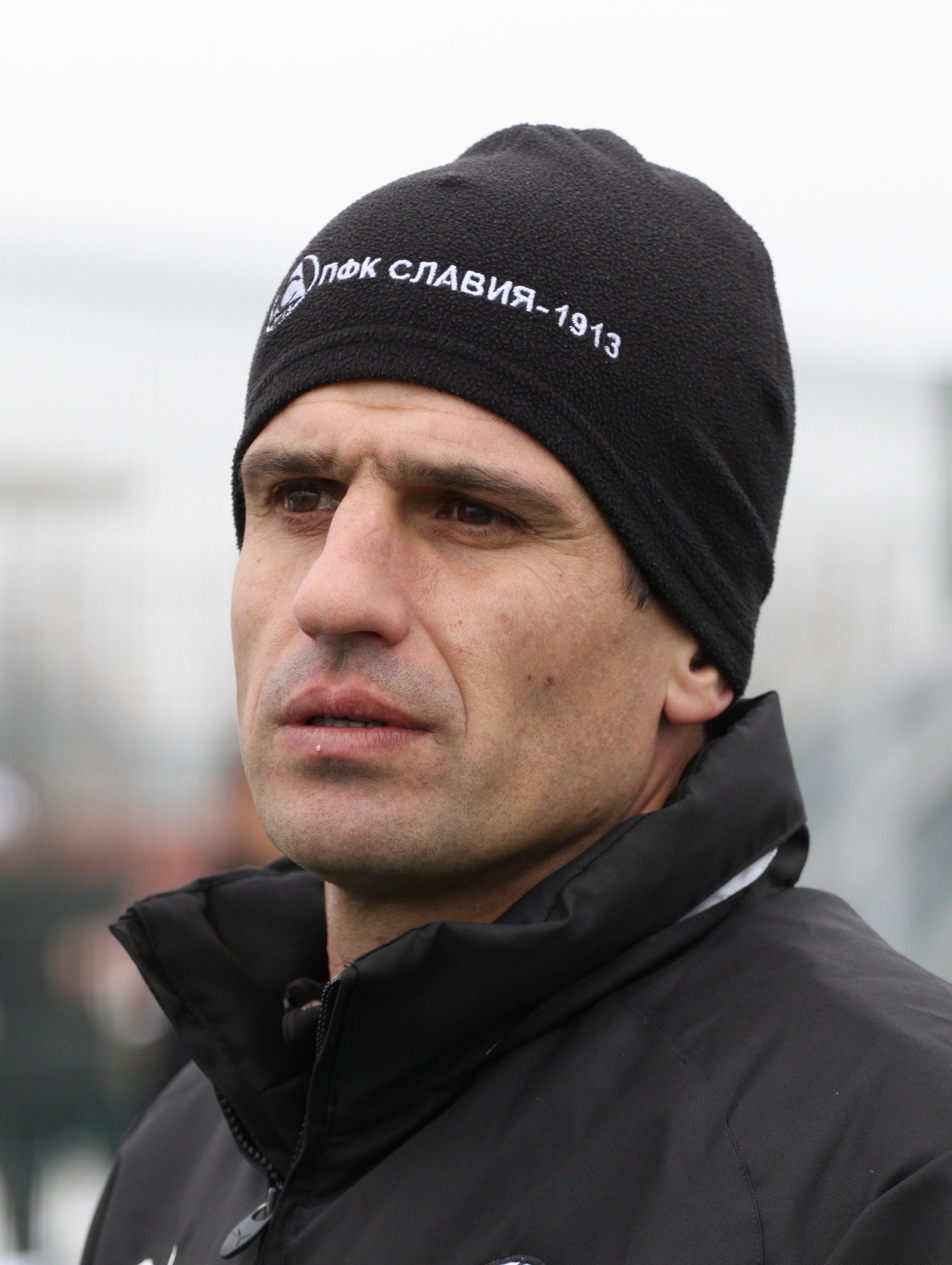
- Ivanov in 2011

Personal information
- Full name: Vladimir Ivanov Ivanov
- Date of birth: 6 February 1973 (age 53)
- Place of birth: Sofia, Bulgaria
- Height: 1.72 m (5 ft 7 1/2 in)
- Position: Right-back

Team information
- Current team: Rilski Sportist (head coach)

Youth career
- 1983–1991: Slavia Sofia

Senior career*
Years	Team	Apps	(Gls)
1991–1996	Slavia Sofia	85	(6)
1997–1998	Levski Sofia	41	(4)
1998–1999	Borussia M'gladbach	0	(0)
2000–2001	Lokomotiv Sofia	42	(3)
2001–2002	Levski Sofia	12	(0)
2002–2006	Lokomotiv Plovdiv	92	(2)
2006–2009	Slavia Sofia	73	(0)
Total		345	(15)

International career
2002–2004	Bulgaria	6	(0)

Managerial career
- 2015: Slavia Sofia (caretaker)
- 2016: Slavia Sofia (assistant)
- 2016–2017: Slavia Sofia
- 2017–2019: Slavia Sofia (assistant)
- 2019: Montana
- 2020–: Rilski Sportist
- * Club domestic league appearances and goals

Vladimir Ivanov (Bulgarian: Владимир Иванов; born 6 February 1973) is a former Bulgarian footballer who played as a defender. He is also known as "Fugata" (Bulgarian: Фугата). On 3 November 2016, following the departure of Aleksandr Tarkhanov, Ivanov was appointed as permanent manager. However, following a streak of poor results, on 11 May 2017 he was demoted to assistant of the newly appointed manager Zlatomir Zagorčić.

In his playing career Ivanov played for Slavia Sofia, Levski Sofia, Lokomotiv Sofia, Lokomotiv Plovdiv and German Borussia Mönchengladbach.

He was part of the Bulgarian 2004 European Football Championship team, who exited in the first round, finishing bottom of Group C, having finished top of Qualifying Group 8 in the pre-tournament phase.

== Managerial statistics ==
As of 11 May 2017

Team	From	To	Record							
Team	From	To	G	W	D	L	Win %	GF	GA	GD
Slavia Sofia	30 November 2015	31 December 2015	3	3	0	0	100.00	7	0	+7
Slavia Sofia	3 November 2016	11 May 2017	19	7	3	9	36.84	20	31	–11
Total			22	10	3	9	45.45	27	31	–4
