= Petar Mihtarski =

Bulgarian footballer and manager

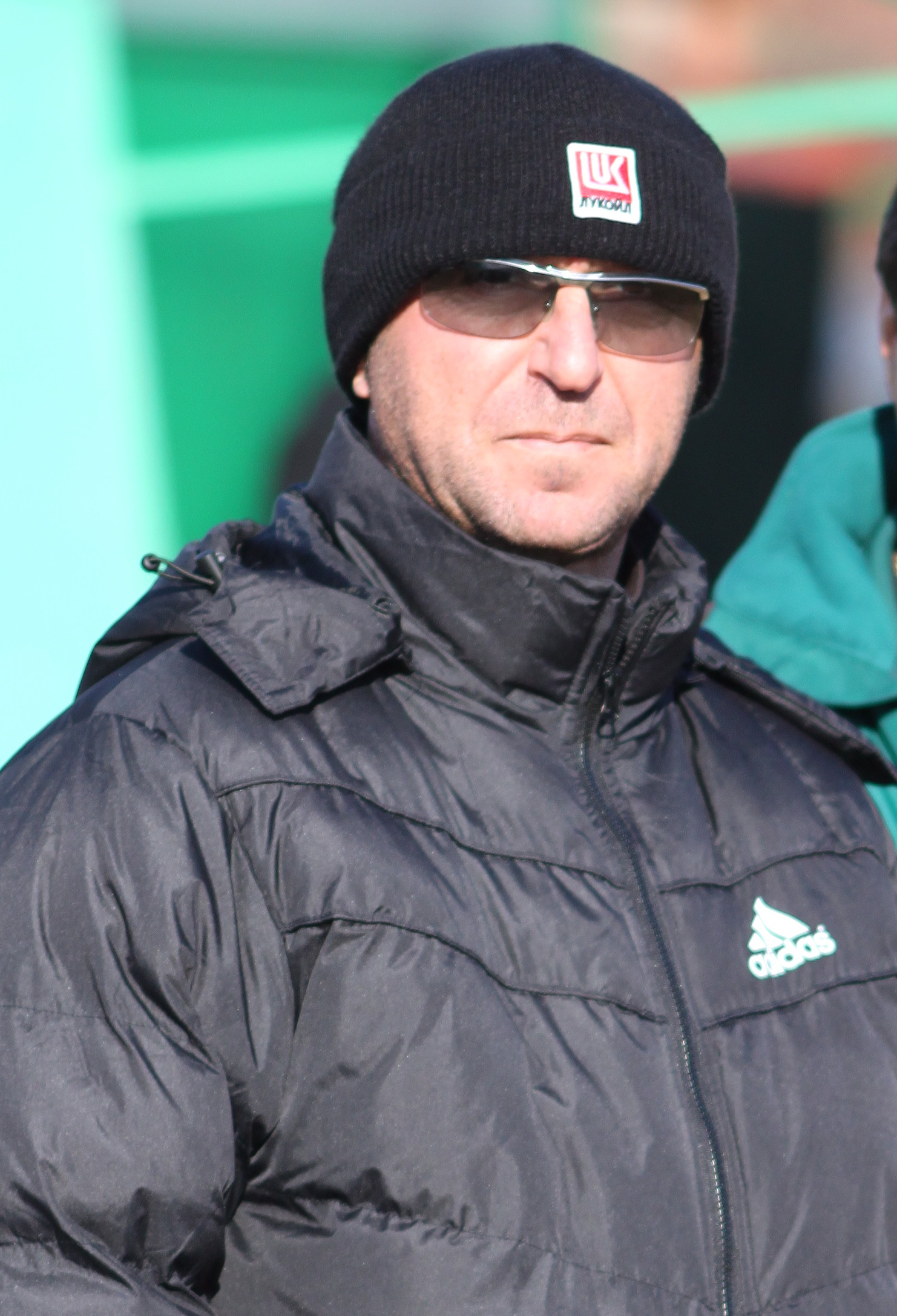

Personal information
- Full name: Petar Sotirov Mihtarski
- Date of birth: 15 July 1966 (age 60)
- Place of birth: Blagoevgrad, Bulgaria
- Height: 1.80 m (5 ft 11 in)
- Position: Striker

Youth career
- 1976–1982: Pirin

Senior career*
Years	Team	Apps	(Gls)
1982–1989	Pirin	166	(70)
1989–1991	Levski Sofia	55	(42)
1991–1994	Porto	12	(5)
1992–1994	→ Famalicão (loan)	42	(11)
1994	Pirin	10	(5)
1994–1995	CSKA Sofia	26	(24)
1995	Mallorca	11	(0)
1996	CSKA Sofia	13	(9)
1996–1997	VfL Wolfsburg	17	(0)
1998–2000	Pirin	48	(15)
2000–2001	Levski Sofia	11	(4)
Total		411	(185)

International career
1985–1988	Bulgaria U21	51	(21)
1988–1995	Bulgaria	8	(0)

Managerial career
- 2002–2004: Pirin
- 2004–2005: Vihren
- 2005: Belasitsa
- 2006–2009: Pirin 1922
- * Club domestic league appearances and goals

Petar Sotirov Mihtarski (Bulgarian: Петър Сотиров Михтарски; born 15 July 1966) is a Bulgarian retired football player and manager, who played as a striker.

He amassed First Professional Football League totals of 303 games and 158 goals during 14 seasons, representing mainly Pirin Blagoevgrad (nine years) and Levski Sofia (three). He also competed professionally in Portugal and Spain.

Mihtarski was part of the Bulgaria national team's squad at the 1994 World Cup. In 2002, he started working as a coach.

== Club career ==
Born in Blagoevgrad, Mihtarski spent the first 13 years of his career (youth years included) with local OFC Pirin, making his first-team – and First Professional Football League – debuts in 1982–83, appearing in eight games and scoring four goals in an eventual relegation. He went on to score in double digits in five of the following six seasons.

In the summer of 1989, Mihtarski signed for PFC Levski Sofia, netting 24 times in his debut campaign and winning one Bulgarian Cup during his two-year spell. Subsequently, he joined FC Porto in Portugal, being barred by countryman Emil Kostadinov for most of his stay and also being loaned twice to fellow Primeira Liga side F.C. Famalicão; in his first year, however, he did manage five goals in only 11 games as the northerners won the national championship for the third time in five years.

In February 1994, Mihtarski was released by Porto and rejoined Pirin, netting five times in three months to help the club retain its top flight status. He then joined PFC CSKA Sofia, equalling a career-best 24 goals in the 1994–95, best in the competition but not good enough for the national title, as former team Levski won the championship with CSKA ranking only fifth.

On 23 September 1994, Mihtarksi scored the only goal for CSKA in their record-breaking 7–1 loss against Levski. During that year's UEFA Cup he added two to help the hosts defeat Juventus FC 3–2, but he was subsequently found to have been ineligible for the match and the opposition were awarded a 3–0 win; he also found the net in the second leg, a 5–1 loss in Turin.

Mihtarski moved abroad again in January 1996, going on to spend the bulk of the following two seasons without scoring, including for both RCD Mallorca in Spain and VfL Wolfsburg, with both teams in their respective countries' second division. After two more years with Pirin, he retired from the game at the age of 35 winning the first and only Bulgarian championship of his career, with Levski, albeit appearing sparingly.

Mihtarski coached several clubs after retiring, including Pirin, Vihren, Belasitsa, and Pirin 1922. Between 2014 and 2018 he was assistant manager of the Bulgaria U21 team.

== International career ==
Mihtarski is the most capped player in the history of the Bulgaria U21 team, making 51 appearances and scoring 21 goals. Barred by the likes of Kostadinov, Luboslav Penev, Nasko Sirakov and Hristo Stoitchkov, Mihtarski only earned eight caps for Bulgaria national team in six years (no goals), his debut coming on 28 April 1988 against Denmark. He was part of the team that reached the semi-finals of the 1994 FIFA World Cup in the United States, but his input in the competition consisted of one minute in the penalty shootout win against Mexico in the round-of-16.

== Personal life ==
Mihtarski was only the second Bulgarian footballer whose surname did not end with a "V" to play in the FIFA World Cup finals. The first was Milko Gaydarski, in 1970.

== Honours ==
Pirin

- Bulgarian Cup: runner-up 1993–94

Levski Sofia

- First Professional Football League (Bulgaria): 2000–01
- Bulgarian Cup: 1990–91

Porto

- Primeira Liga: 1991–92

Bulgaria

- FIFA World Cup: fourth place 1994

Individual

- First Professional Football League (Bulgaria) top scorer: 1994–95 (24 goals)
