= Georgi Dimitrov (footballer, born 1966) =

Bulgarian footballer (born 1966)

Personal information
- Date of birth: 10 September 1966 (age 60)
- Place of birth: Bulgaria
- Position: Striker

Senior career*
Years	Team	Apps	(Gls)
1983–1990	Lokomotiv Plovdiv		
1990–1991	Mallorca	1	(0)
1991–1992	Levski Sofia	24	(5)
1992–1993	Altay	21	(1)
1993–1998	Lokomotiv Plovdiv		

International career
1990–1992	Bulgaria	3	(0)
- * Club domestic league appearances and goals

Georgi Dimitrov (Bulgarian: Георги Димитров; born 10 September 1966) is a Bulgarian former footballer who last played as a striker for Lokomotiv (Plovdiv).

== Early life and personal life ==
Dimitrov is a native of Plovdiv, Bulgaria. Dimitrov has been nicknamed "Cowboy". He has one daughter, Monika G. Dimitrova.

== Career ==
Dimitrov mainly operated as a striker and was described as "delighted the Lauta audience with his football intelligence and speed technique".

He was capped three times for Bulgaria in the early 1990s.
