= Tomas Lafchis =

Bulgarian footballer

Personal information
- Full name: Tomas Lafchis
- Date of birth: 6 August 1958 (age 68)
- Place of birth: Sofia, Bulgaria
- Height: 1.93 m (6 ft 4 in)
- Position: Goalkeeper

Senior career*
Years	Team	Apps	(Gls)
1976–1979	Levski Sofia	28	(0)
1979–1981	Panathinaikos	0	(0)
1981–1983	OFI	33	(0)
1983–1985	Panathinaikos	45	(0)
1985	Sredets Sofia	0	(0)
1986	Cherno More	4	(0)
1986–1987	Antwerp	4	(0)
1987–1988	OFI	15	(0)

International career
1976–1977	Bulgaria U18	25	(0)
1979	Bulgaria U21	3	(0)

Managerial career
- 1991–1999: Levski Sofia
- * Club domestic league appearances and goals

Tomas Lafchis also pronounced Thomas Laftsis (Bulgarian: Томас Лафчис, Greek: Θωμάς Λαφτσής; born 6 August 1958) is a Bulgarian retired footballer who played as a goalkeeper for clubs in Bulgaria, Greece and Belgium.

== Playing career ==
Lafchis began playing football for Bulgarian clubs PFC Cherno More Varna and OFC Sliven. In 1977, he joined PFC Levski Sofia, and helped the club win the Bulgarian Cup and the Bulgarian A PFG in 1979.

In 1981, Lafchis joined Greek first division side OFI for two seasons. He moved to fellow First Division club Panathinaikos F.C. for the following two seasons, where he would win the Greek Football Cup. After a brief spell in Belgium, he returned to play two more seasons in the Greek First Division with OFI Crete.

== Managerial career ==
After he retired from playing, Lafchis became a director. He was the owner of Levski Sofia from 1991 to 1999. In this era, Levski managed to win three Bulgarian A PFG titles and four Bulgarian Cups.

== Personal ==
Lafchis is of Greek ethnicity. He is married to Bulgarian National Television director Vyara Ankova.
