= Vladko Shalamanov =

Bulgarian footballer

Personal information
- Full name: Vladko Dimitrov Shalamanov
- Date of birth: 25 April 1967 (age 59)
- Place of birth: Bulgaria
- Position: Midfielder

Senior career*
Years	Team	Apps	(Gls)
1986–1987	Levski Sofia	14	(1)
1987–1988	Tundzha Yambol	24	(9)
1988–1989	Lokomotiv Sofia	29	(4)
1989–1991	Levski Sofia	49	(7)
1991–1992	Aris	30	(3)
1992–1993	Levski Sofia	7	(0)
1993	Sliven	11	(7)
1993–1995	Slavia Sofia	67	(35)
1995–1997	Altay İzmir	40	(10)
1997–1998	Lokomotiv Sofia	15	(2)
1998–1999	Slavia Sofia	32	(7)
1999–2001	Imortal	46	(3)
2001–2003	Portimonense	40	(6)
Total		399	(101)

International career
1995	Bulgaria	5	(0)
- * Club domestic league appearances and goals

Vladko Shalamanov (Bulgarian: Владко Шаламанов; born 25 April 1967) is a former Bulgarian footballer who played as a midfielder.

== Career ==
Shalamanov played for a number of teams in the top Bulgarian league, most notably for Levski Sofia and Slavia Sofia. He used to captain the latter and in December 2013 was one of the footballers honoured with a special prize at a ceremony commemorating 100 years since the founding of the "whites". Shalamanov also plied his trade abroad, having short spells in Greece and Turkey. He additionally spent four years in Portugal before retiring from the game. He made his debut for Bulgaria on 12 April 1995, in the 0:0 away draw with Macedonia in a friendly match.

== Honours ==
=== Club ===
Levski Sofia

- Bulgarian A Group: 1992–93
- Bulgarian Cup (2): 1986, 1991
