= 1995–96 Bulgarian Cup =

Tournament details
- Country: Bulgaria

Final positions
- Champions: Slavia Sofia (7th cup)
- Runners-up: Levski Sofia

Tournament statistics
- Top goal scorer(s): Sirakov (Slavia); Shalamanov (Slavia); G. Dimitrov (Loko Pd); Zhabov (CSKA); Donev (Levski) (4 goals each)

The 1995–96 Bulgarian Cup was the 56th season of the Bulgarian Cup. Slavia Sofia won the competition, beating Levski Sofia in the final at the Vasil Levski National Stadium in Sofia.

== First round ==
| Team 1 | Score | Team 2 |
7 November 1995
| Spartak Pleven (II) | 2–5 | Slavia Sofia (I) |
8 November 1995
| Edinstvo Gurkovo (III) | 1–6 | CSKA Sofia (I) |
| Atletik Velingrad (III) | 7–1 | Rakovski Ruse (I) |
| Shumen (I) | 1–0 | Akademik Sofia (II) |
| Ludogorets Razgrad (III) | 0–1 | Spartak Plovdiv (I) |
| Gigant Belene (III) | 0–4 | Lokomotiv Plovdiv (I) |
| Benkovski Byala (III) | 0–7 | Lokomotiv Sofia (I) |
| Storgozia Pleven (II) | 1–2 | Velbazhd Kyustendil (I) |
| Vihren Sandanski (III) | 0–1 | Neftochimic Burgas (I) |
| Chirpan (II) | 2–0 | Dobrudzha Dobrich (I) |
| Maritsa Plovdiv (II) | 3–2 | Montana (I) |
| Spartak Varna (I) | 6–1 | Yantra Gabrovo (II) |
| Levski Sofia (I) | 2–0 | Cherno More Varna (II) |
| Septemvri Sofia (II) | 3–1 | Litex Lovech (I) |
| Metalurg Pernik (III) | 1–0 | Botev Plovdiv (I) |
| Etar Veliko Tarnovo (I) | 4–1 | Lokomotiv Ruse (II) |

== Second round ==
| Team 1 | Agg. | Team 2 | 1st leg | 2nd leg |
29 November / 9, 16 December 1995
| CSKA Sofia (I) | 6–0 | Etar Veliko Tarnovo (I) | 3–0 | 3–0 |
| Lokomotiv Sofia (I) | 5–3 | Velbazhd Kyustendil (I) | 5–1 | 0–2 |
| Slavia Sofia (I) | 4–0 | Shumen (I) | 4–0 | 0–0 |
| Spartak Varna (I) | 3–6 | Levski Sofia (I) | 2–2 | 1–4 |
| Spartak Plovdiv (I) | 5–1 | Septemvri Sofia (II) | 3–0 | 2–1 |
| Maritsa Plovdiv (II) | 3–3 (6–7 p) | Lokomotiv Plovdiv (I) | 2–1 | 1–2 (a.e.t.) |
| Atletik Velingrad (III) | 1–4 | Neftochimic Burgas (I) | 1–1 | 0–3 (w/o) |
| Metalurg Pernik (III) | 3–3 (a) | Chirpan (II) | 2–0 | 1–3 |

== Quarter-finals ==
| Team 1 | Agg. | Team 2 | 1st leg | 2nd leg |
5, 6 / 20 March 1996
| Levski Sofia (I) | 7–2 | Lokomotiv Sofia (I) | 2–0 | 5–2 |
| CSKA Sofia (I) | 5–2 | Neftochimic Burgas (I) | 3–0 | 2–2 |
| Slavia Sofia (I) | 4–1 | Metalurg Pernik (III) | 4–1 | 0–0 |
| Spartak Plovdiv (I) | 1–2 | Lokomotiv Plovdiv (I) | 0–1 | 1–1 |

== Semi-finals ==
| Team 1 | Agg. | Team 2 | 1st leg | 2nd leg |
3 / 17 April 1996
| Levski Sofia (I) | 5–2 | CSKA Sofia (I) | 1–0 | 4–2 |
| Lokomotiv Plovdiv (I) | 1–4 | Slavia Sofia (I) | 0–2 | 1–2 |

== Final ==
=== Details ===
1 May 1996
18:00 EEST

| Slavia Sofia | 4–0 (w/o) | Levski Sofia |
|---|---|---|
| Kirov 35' | In 75th minute the match was cancelled by Levski's chairman Tomas Lafchis. |

Vasil Levski National Stadium, Sofia
Attendance: 19,500
Referee: Mitko Mitrev (Sofia)

| Slavia | Levski |
