= Veselin Sarbakov =

Bulgarian footballer

Veselin Sarbakov Веселин Сърбаков
Personal information
- Full name: Veselin Dimitrov Sarbakov
- Date of birth: 8 August 1975 (age 51)
- Place of birth: Bulgaria
- Position: Midfielder

Senior career*
Years	Team	Apps	(Gls)
1993–1997	Levski Sofia	29	(2)
1997–1998	Litex Lovech	16	(3)
1998–1999	Levski Sofia	6	(0)
2000	Hebar Pazardzhik		
2001	Chernomorets Burgas		
2002-2003	Hapoel Rishon LeZion	1	(0)
2006	Kaliakra Kavarna		

Managerial career
- 2008–: Levski Sofia (youth teams)
- * Club domestic league appearances and goals

Veselin Sarbakov (Bulgarian: Веселин Сърбаков; born 8 August 1975) is a former Bulgarian footballer who is currently U-12 coach at Levski Sofia.

== Biography ==
Sarbakov spent the majority of his career in the top flight of Bulgarian football, most notably representing Levski Sofia almost continuously between the 1993/1994 and 1998/1999 seasons, making 35 league appearances and scoring two goals for the "bluemen". He also played for Litex Lovech, Pirin, Akademik Sofia, Kaliakra, Vihren, and Hebar. Following Sarbakov's retirement, he became coach of Levski Sofia youth teams, obtaining a UEFA "A" license.
