= FC Metalurg Pernik =

Bulgarian football club

Metalurg
- Full name: Football club Metalurg Pernik
- Nicknames: founded = 1957; 69 years ago /restored 2013; 13 years ago/
- Ground: Metalurg, Pernik
- Capacity: 18,000
- League: A RFG
- 2024-25: A RFG Pernik, 1st
Home colours	Away colours

FC Metalurg (Bulgarian: ФК Металург) is a football club from Pernik, Bulgaria.Their stadium "Metalurg". Between 1997 and 1999 the team counted two participations in the A PFG, the top division of Bulgarian football. Metalurg currently competes in the fourth level of Bulgarian football, A RFG Pernik. Metalurg has a traditional rivalry with fellow Pernik-based club, Minyor. Matches between the two teams are often marked by violent acts from the two supporter groups.

== History ==
The club was founded in 1957 as Zavod Stalin by the merger of two local teams Stroitel and Torpedo. The team finally became known as Metalurg in 1963. In the same year the club were promoted for the first time to B PFG.

In 1997, Metalurg achieved a historic promotion to the A Group. The team performed decently in their first season of top-level football, achieving a mid-table finish. In terms of sporting performance, the second season in the elite was also successful, however it was marred by off-field controversy. It was discovered that Metalurg was involved in a match-fixing scandal with other teams, which resulted in the Bulgarian Football Union expelling the club from the A Group, ending their two-year stay in the elite.

It was restored in 2013 after being dissolved in 2008 and started from the 4th league.

== Players ==
As of 4 January 2016

Note: Flags indicate national team as defined under FIFA eligibility rules; some limited exceptions apply. Players may hold more than one non-FIFA nationality.

No. / Pos. / Nation / Player	No. / Pos. / Nation / Player

== Past seasons ==
Season	League	Place	W	D	L	GF	GA	Pts	Bulgarian Cup
2014–15	A RFG (IV)	1	18	4	2	102	20	58	not qualified
2015–16	A RFG	3	16	2	6	75	32	50	not qualified
2016–17	A RFG	–	–	–	–	–	–	–	not qualified
Green marks a season followed by promotion, red a season followed by relegation.
