= Petar Kosturkov =

Bulgarian footballer and manager

Personal information
- Date of birth: 10 September 1969 (age 57)
- Place of birth: Brežany, Bulgaria
- Height: 1.74 m (5 ft 8 1/2 in)
- Position: Midfielder

Senior career*
Years	Team	Apps	(Gls)
1990–1992	Pirin Blagoevgrad		
1992–1994	Spartak Pleven		
1994–1996	Levski Sofia	13	(0)
1996–1997	FC Dobrudzha Dobrich		
1997–1999	SC Austria Lustenau	47	(2)
1999–2006	TSV Crailsheim	59	(12)

Managerial career
- 2005–2008: TSV Crailsheim
- 2008–2012: VfR Aalen II
- 2012–2014: TSV Crailsheim (junior)
- 2014–2016: TSV Crailsheim (women's)
- 2016–2017: TSV Ilshofen
- 2017: BV Cloppenburg
- 2017–2018: Sportfreunde Schwäbisch Hall
- * Club domestic league appearances and goals

Petar Kosturkov (Bulgarian: Петър Костурков) (born 10 September 1969) is a former Bulgarian footballer who is currently manager.

== Career ==
A midfielder, between 1994 and 1996 Kosturkov played in 13 A PFG matches for Levski Sofia, becoming champion of Bulgaria at the end of the 1994–95 season. He also represented Pirin Blagoevgrad, Etar, Pirin Razlog, Dobrudzha, and Spartak Pleven, while also having a spell abroad with Austria Lustenau.
