= PFC Slavia Sofia =

Bulgarian association football club

Slavia Sofia
- Full name: Professional Football Club Slavia
- Nicknames: Белите (The Whites); Добрата стара Славия (The good old Slavia); Бялата Лавина (The White Avalanche)
- Founded: 10 April 1913; 113 years ago
- Ground: Stadion Aleksandar Shalamanov
- Capacity: 25,000
- Owner: Mladen Mihalev
- Chairman: Ventsеslav Stefanov
- Manager: Ratko Dostanić
- League: First League
- 2025–26: First League, 11th of 16
- Website: pfcslavia.com
| Home colours | Away colours |

PFC Slavia Sofia 1913 (Bulgarian: ПФК Славия София 1913) is a Bulgarian professional association football club based in Sofia, which currently competes in the top tier of the Bulgarian football league system, the First League. Slavia's home ground is the Stadion Aleksandar Shalamanov in Ovcha kupel with a capacity of 25,556. The team's colours are white and black. Established on 10 April 1913, Slavia is currently the oldest sports club in Sofia.

Slavia is one of only two Bulgarian football clubs that have never been relegated (the other being Levski Sofia), although the club has been divided into two separate clubs and one of them that carries Slavia records and statistics (Udarnik Sofia) had been expelled to the Second Division, which continued for a season (1951), for no other reason, but politically arranged football reform. The other separate entity (Stroitel Sofia) which is now defunct and regarded as a different club had remained in First Division. Later on the two clubs reunited again.

Domestically, the club has won the Bulgarian Championship seven times and the Bulgarian Cup eight times. They have also been runners-up in the championship ten times and have reached the cup final on three additional occasions. Among the team's international successes are a European Cup Winners' Cup semi-final in 1967 and a quarter-final in 1981, as well as two consecutive Balkans Cup trophies in 1986 and 1988.

Slavia have a rivalry with fellow Sofia-based club Levski Sofia. Matches between the two teams are known as the Oldest capital derby, because Slavia and Levski are the oldest, continuously existing football teams from Sofia. They used to compete regularly for trophies before 1945. More recently, their current main rivals are Lokomotiv Sofia, called the Little capital derby, as well as a rivalry with the city's other club CSKA.

== History ==

On 10 April 1913, a group of young people living near a Russian Monument in Sofia and representatives of the local capital clubs Botev and Razvitie, in a coffee-house – Alabin str. in Sofia, decided to establish an incorporated sports club, the first organized sport club in Sofia. The new incorporated club was named Slavia. Dimitar Blagoev – Palio, a 21-year-old student, was elected as the first president of the club. As members of the first club administrative council were elected Emanuil Geshev, Ferdinand Mihaylov, Tsvyatko Velichkov, Georgi Grigorov and Todor Kalkandzhiev.

A few days later, was elected the first football team of the club – Stefan Lalov, Ilia Georgiev, Emanuil Geshev, Todor Kalkandzhiev, Stefan Chumpalov, Dimitar Blagoev – Palio (all of them from Botev) and Pavel Grozdanov, Ferdinand Mihaylov, Boris Sharankov, Asen Bramchev, Dimitar Cvetkov (all of them from Razvitie). The first sport dresses of the club were white shirts and black shorts. Since 1924, the team has played with white shirts and white shorts and up to present days it is popular as the "White pride". On 11 August 1913, Slavia played its first match, against local club Savata, and won 1–0.

After World War I, Slavia began to become more successful. On 5 June 1928, the club won its first champion title, winning 4–0 in the final match against Vladislav Varna. Slavia won the title five more times until 1946, in 1930, 1936, 1938–39, 1941 and 1943.

Slavia won its first Bulgarian Cup in 1952. By winning the 1963 Bulgarian Cup Final, Slavia qualified for the European Cup Winners' Cup, the club's first appearance in European competition. They were drawn against Hungarian club MTK Budapest in the first round. Slavia were eliminated from the competition 2–1 on aggregate. Its most important achievements in Europe during 1966–67 Cup Winners' Cup campaign when Slavia eliminated Swansea City, Strasbourg and Servette, before being eliminated by Rangers in the semi-finals. The team consisted of great players such as goalkeeper Simeon Simeonov, Ivan Davidov, Aleksandar Shalamanov, Dimitar Largov, Dimitar Kostov and Aleksandar Vasilev.

In 1969, Slavia was merged with Lokomotiv Sofia under the name ZhSK Slavia. Two years later, the two clubs split again after a split was supported by 100,000 fans.

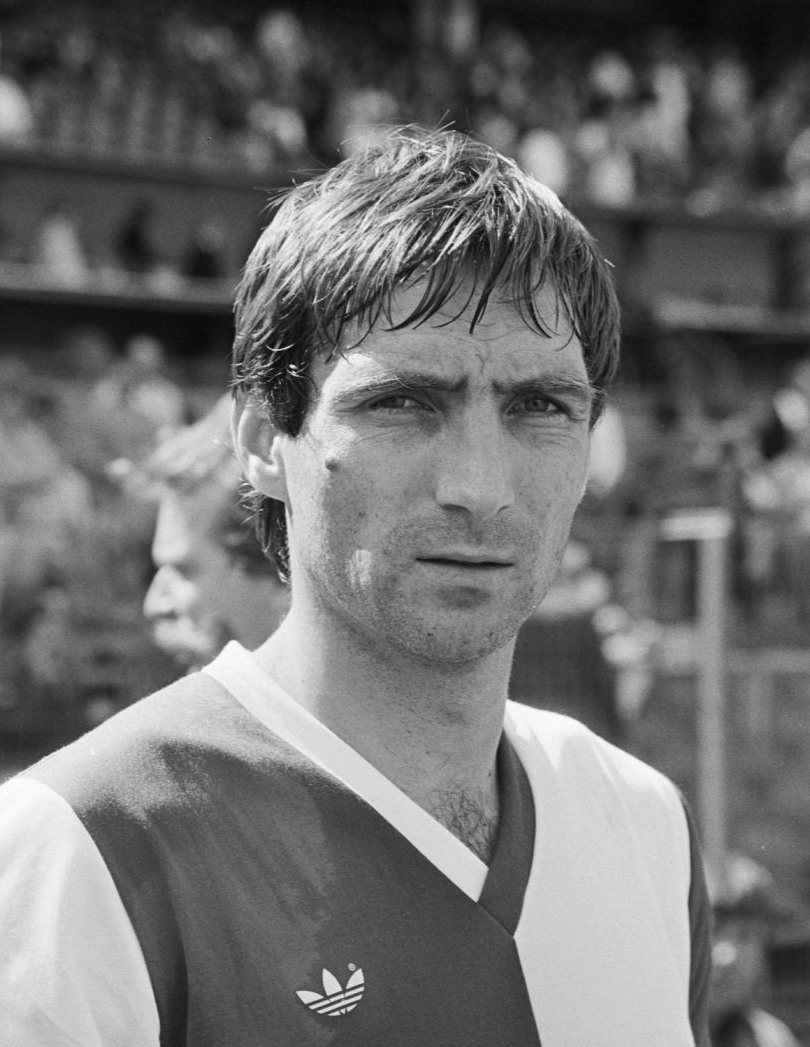
Andrey Zhelyazkov in 1981

In the 1980–81 season, led by Chavdar Tsvetkov and Andrey Zhelyazkov, Slavia reached the quarter-finals of the Cup Winners' Cup before losing 6–3 on aggregate to Feyenoord. In 1986, Slavia won Balkans Cup, defeating Greek side Panionios 5–3 on aggregate in the final. In 1988, Slavia won the Balkans Cup for the second time.

In 1994, Stoyan Kotsev, the former Slavia midfielder, was appointed as the club's new manager. After finishing fourth in 1995, they went on to win the A PFG title in 1995–96. Slavia finished with five points more than second-placed Levski Sofia. This marked Slavia's first Bulgarian title since 1943. In the 2010–11 season, Slavia reached the Bulgarian Cup final, defeating Ludogorets Razgrad, Etar 1924, Chernomorets Burgas and Pirin Blagoevgrad en route. However, they lost the final 1–0 to CSKA Sofia.

In 2018, Slavia won the Bulgarian Cup for the eight time in its history, defeating rivals Levski Sofia at the Vasil Levski National Stadium after a penalty shootout. This enabled the team to play in the 2018-19 UEFA Europa League second qualifying round. In the second qualifying round, Slavia eliminated Finnish side FC Ilves. However, in the third qualifying round, they lost to Hajduk Split of Croatia, thus being eliminated.

The 2019–20 season was very successful for Slavia. The team finished in third place, qualifying for the Europa League playoff. Slavia clinched the third place in the last round of the season, defeating champions Ludogorets 3–1 at home, while Levski Sofia lost 1–2 to Lokomotiv Plovdiv, thus making Slavia third. This was Slavia's best placement since the 1996–97 season.

== Players ==
=== Current squad ===
As of 25 August 2026

Note: Flags indicate national team as defined under FIFA eligibility rules; some limited exceptions apply. Players may hold more than one non-FIFA nationality.

| No. | Pos. | Nation | Player |
|---|---|---|---|
| 1 | GK | BUL | Georgi Petkov (vice-captain) |
| 3 | DF | BUL | Martin Georgiev |
| 4 | DF | SRB | Nikola Savić |
| 5 | DF | MOZ | David Malembana |
| 6 | MF | BUL | Boris Todorov |
| 7 | FW | BUL | Roberto Raychev |
| 8 | MF | BUL | Georgi Shopov |
| 9 | FW | BUL | Yoan Bornosuzov |
| 10 | FW | BUL | Vladimir Nikolov |
| 11 | MF | FRA | Mouhamed Dosso |
| 16 | DF | BUL | Maksimilian Lazarov |
| 17 | MF | BUL | Vasil Kazaldzhiev |
| 19 | FW | BUL | Emilian Gogev |

| No. | Pos. | Nation | Player |
|---|---|---|---|
| 20 | DF | CPV | Jordan Semedo |
| 23 | FW | BUL | Ilian Antonov |
| 24 | DF | BUL | Lazar Marin |
| 26 | DF | BUL | Dimitar Burov |
| 27 | FW | GBS | Umaro Baldé |
| 63 | GK | FRA | Lévi Ntumba |
| 71 | MF | BUL | Kristiyan Stoyanov |
| 73 | MF | BUL | Ivan Minchev (captain) |
| 77 | MF | BUL | Emil Stoev |
| 87 | DF | BUL | Diego Ferraresso |
| 95 | MF | SRB | Vladimir Miletić |
| 99 | GK | BUL | Ivan Andonov |

For recent transfers, see Transfers winter 2025–26 and Transfers summer 2026.

=== Out on loan ===
Note: Flags indicate national team as defined under FIFA eligibility rules; some limited exceptions apply. Players may hold more than one non-FIFA nationality.

| No. | Pos. | Nation | Player |
|---|---|---|---|
| — | FW | SRB | Marko Miletić (at Marek until 30 June 2027) |

=== Foreign players ===
Up to twenty foreign nationals can be registered and given a squad number for the first team in the Bulgarian First League, however only five non-EU nationals can be used during a match day. Those non-EU nationals with European ancestry can claim citizenship from the nation their ancestors came from. If a player does not have European ancestry he can claim Bulgarian citizenship after playing in Bulgaria for 5 years.

EU Nationals

EU Nationals (Dual citizenship)

- (Bulgaria) (Brazil) Diego Ferraresso
- (Cape Verde) (France) Jordan Semedo
- (France) (Ivory Coast) Mouhamed Dosso
- (France) (Democratic Republic of the Congo) Lévi Ntumba
- (Guinea-Bissau) (Portugal) Umaro Baldé
- (Mozambique) (Germany) David Malembana

Non-EU Nationals

- (Serbia) Nikola Savić
- (Serbia) Vladimir Miletić

== Supporters ==
There is one remaining ultras group called Boys Sofia, a name referring to the fact the traditional support is from the south of the city; in the past there were multiple other groups. They have a long standing friendship with BSC Young Boys and FC VSS Kosice.They also have friendships with Bulgarians PFC Cherno more Varna and PFC Dobrudzha. The traditional rivalry has been with Levski Sofia, also known as Oldest capital derby, however in recent decades Lokomotiv Sofia has become the major rival. The derby between them is called Little capital derby. The other city rivalry is with CSKA Sofia.

== Stadium ==
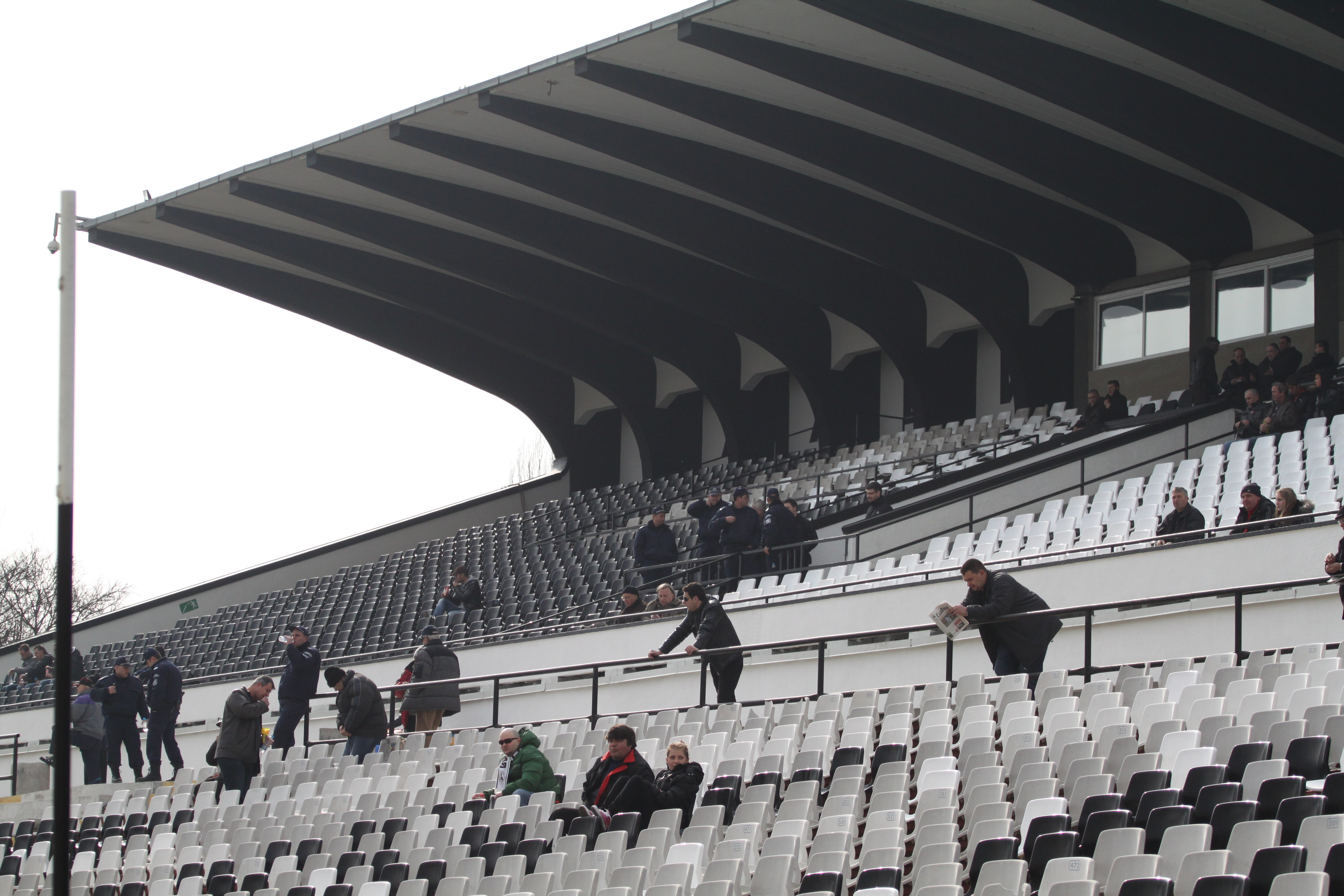
Slavia Stadium in 2011

In the first ten years after Slavia was founded, the club played in the stadium of his predecessor SC Razvitie. On 3 October 1923, Slavia became the owner of land to the Russian Monument in Sofia, where was the first ground of the club. They played their home games there for the next few decades, until they moved to southwest Sofia in the 1960s.

On 12 March 1958, started the construction of Slavia Stadium. Mayor of the sixth area in Sofia and president of the Slavia women's basketball team, Dimitar Tinev, presided at the laying in place of the first stone. The stadium is built in a residential area Ovcha Kupel, served by regular bus services 6 km from Sofia city centre. Slavia Stadium has undergone many changes over the years and it presently has a capacity of 25,556.

== Honours ==
=== National ===
- First League:
  - Winners (7): 1928, 1930, 1936, 1939, 1941, 1943, 1995–96
- Bulgarian Cup:
  - Winners (8): 1952, 1962–63, 1963–64, 1965–66, 1974–75, 1979–80, 1995–96, 2017–18

=== European ===
- Balkans Cup
  - Winners (2): 1986, 1987–88
- Cup Winners Cup
  - Semi-finals: 1966–67
- UEFA Intertoto Cup
  - First place in group four: 1977

== Board of directors ==
| Name | Role |
|---|---|
| (Bulgaria) Mladen Mihalev | Owner |
| (Bulgaria) Ventseslav Stefanov | Chairman |
| (Bulgaria) Vesko Sabev | Managing Director |
| (Bulgaria) Angel Slavkov | Youth Academy Director |

== Technical staff ==
| Name | Role |
|---|---|
| (Serbia) Ratko Dostanić | Head Coach |
| (Bulgaria) Martin Kushev | Assistant Coach |
| (Bulgaria) Radostin Stanev | Goalkeeping Coach |
| (Bulgaria) Kiril Dinchev | Conditioning Coach |
| (Bulgaria) Deniz Yilmaz | Physiotherapist |
| (Bulgaria) Viktor Rakovski | Physiotherapist |
| (Bulgaria) Ivan Zlatev | Physiotherapist |
| (Bulgaria) Tsvetomir Valeriev | Analyst |
| (Bulgaria) Svetoslav Kostadinov | Team manager |
| (Bulgaria) Ventsislav Savov | Kit Manager |

== Notable stats ==
Most league appearances for the club
| Rank | Name | Nat | Games | Active |
|---|---|---|---|---|
| 1 | Andrey Zhelyazkov | (Bulgaria) | 338 | No |
| 2 | Atanas Aleksandrov | (Bulgaria) | 317 | No |
| 3 | Iliyaz Aliev | (Bulgaria) | 306 | No |
| 4 | Bozhidar Grigorov | (Bulgaria) | 301 | No |
| 5 | Georgi Gugalov | (Bulgaria) | 293 | No |
| 6 | Ivan Haydarliev | (Bulgaria) | 264 | No |
| 7 | Aleksandar Shalamanov | (Bulgaria) | 262 | No |
| 8 | Galin Ivanov | (Bulgaria) | 258 | Yes |
| 9 | Chavdar Tsvetkov | (Bulgaria) | 255 | No |
| 10 | Ivan Iliev | (Bulgaria) | 247 | No |

Most league goals for the club
| Rank | Name | Nat | Goals | Active |
|---|---|---|---|---|
| 1 | Andrey Zhelyazkov | (Bulgaria) | 136 | No |
| 2 | Bozhidar Grigorov | (Bulgaria) | 128 | No |
| 3 | Chavdar Tsvetkov | (Bulgaria) | 104 | No |
| 4 | Aleksandar Vasilev | (Bulgaria) | 100 | No |
| | Petar Aleksandrov | (Bulgaria) | 100 | No |
| 6 | Dobromir Tashkov | (Bulgaria) | 97 | No |
| 7 | Atanas Aleksandrov | (Bulgaria) | 59 | No |
| 8 | Iliyaz Aliev | (Bulgaria) | 55 | No |
| 9 | Martin Kushev | (Bulgaria) | 53 | No |
| 10 | Galin Ivanov | (Bulgaria) | 52 | Yes |

Bulgarian league top scorer with the club
| Rank | Name | Nat | Goals | Active |
|---|---|---|---|---|
| 1938 | Krum Milev | (Bulgaria) | 12 | No |
| 1952 | Dimitar Isakov | (Bulgaria) | 10 | No |
| 1954 | Dobromir Tashkov | (Bulgaria) | 25 | No |
| 1958 | Dobromir Tashkov | (Bulgaria) | 9 | No |
| 1959 | Aleksandar Vasilev | (Bulgaria) | 13 | No |
| 1997 | Todor Pramatarov | (Bulgaria) | 26 | No |

== Managerial history ==
This is a list of the last Slavia managers:

| Name | Nat | From | To | Honours |
|---|---|---|---|---|
| Dobromir Tashkov | (Bulgaria) | 1963 | 1969 | – |
| Dobromir Tashkov | (Bulgaria) | 1973 | 1974 | – |
| Hristo Mladenov | (Bulgaria) | 1978 | 1980 | – |
| Oleh Bazylevych | (Soviet Union) | 1987 | 1988 | – |
| Stoyan Kotsev | (Bulgaria) | 1994 | 1997 | 1 Bulgarian Cup; 1 Bulgarian title |
| Miroslav Mironov | (Bulgaria) | Oct 1999 | May 2000 | – |
| Žarko Olarević | (Serbia) | May 2000 | 23 Nov 2000 | – |
| Kiril Kachamanov | (Bulgaria) | 23 Nov 2000 | 25 Sept 2001 | – |
| Žarko Olarević | (Serbia) | 25 Sept 2001 | 18 Dec 2002 | – |
| Miodrag Ješić | (Serbia) | 18 Dec 2002 | 23 Aug 2003 | – |
| Ratko Dostanić | (Serbia) | 24 Aug 2003 | 23 Sept 2004 | – |
| Atanas Dzhambazki | (Bulgaria) | 23 Sept 2004 | 29 March 2005 | – |
| Petar Houbchev | (Bulgaria) | 29 March 2005 | 10 Nov 2005 | – |
| Alyosha Andonov | (Bulgaria) | 10 Nov 2005 | 2 July 2006 | – |
| Ratko Dostanić | (Serbia) | 3 July 2006 | 26 Dec 2006 | – |
| Alyosha Andonov | (Bulgaria) | 26 Dec 2006 | 6 June 2007 | – |
| Stevica Kuzmanovski | (North Macedonia) | 6 June 2007 | 2 June 2009 | – |
| Velislav Vutsov | (Bulgaria) | 2 June 2009 | 18 May 2010 | – |
| Emil Velev | (Bulgaria) | 19 May 2010 | 28 May 2011 | – |
| Martin Kushev | (Bulgaria) | 28 May 2011 | 29 Nov 2012 | – |
| Velislav Vutsov | (Bulgaria) | 30 Nov 2012 | 5 June 2013 | – |
| Asen Bukarev | (Bulgaria) | 5 June 2013 | 20 Oct 2013 | – |
| Milen Radukanov | (Bulgaria) | 21 Oct 2013 | 31 Aug 2014 | – |
| Ivan Kolev | (Bulgaria) | 1 Sep 2014 | 30 Nov 2015 | – |
| Vladimir Ivanov (caretaker) | (Bulgaria) | 30 Nov 2015 | 18 Dec 2015 | – |
| Aleksandr Tarkhanov | (Russia) | 18 Dec 2015 | 2 Nov 2016 | – |
| Vladimir Ivanov | (Bulgaria) | 3 Nov 2016 | 11 May 2017 | – |
| Zlatomir Zagorčić | (Bulgaria) (Serbia) | 11 May 2017 | 1 September 2020 | 1 Bulgarian Cup |
| Martin Kushev | (Bulgaria) | 7 September 2020 | 17 September 2020 | – |
| Aleksandr Tarkhanov | (Russia) | 17 September 2020 | 12 April 2021 | – |
| Zlatomir Zagorčić | (Bulgaria) (Serbia) | 12 April 2021 | 4 May 2023 | – |
| Angel Slavkov (caretaker) | (Bulgaria) | 4 May 2023 | 23 June 2023 | – |
| José Mari Bakero | (Spain) | 23 June 2023 | September 2023 | – |
| Zlatomir Zagorčić | (Bulgaria) (Serbia) | September 2023 | October 2025 | – |
| Ratko Dostanić | (Serbia) | October 2025 | | – |
