= 2000–01 Bulgarian Cup =

Tournament details
- Country: Bulgaria

Final positions
- Champions: Litex Lovech (1st cup)
- Runners-up: Velbazhd Kyustendil

The 2000–01 Bulgarian Cup was the 61st season of the Bulgarian Cup. Litex Lovech won the competition, beating Velbazhd Kyustendil 1–0 in the final at the Stadion Lokomotiv in Sofia.

== First round ==
In this round entered winners from the preliminary round together with the teams from B Group.

Team 1	Score	Team 2
23 September 2000
Dragoman (III)	0–3	Pirin Blagoevgrad (II)
Trakia Panagyurishte (III)	0–4	Marek Dupnitsa (II)
Lokomotiv Ruse (III)	2–1	Lokomotiv Plovdiv (II)
Sokol Markovo (III)	1–0	Belasitsa Petrich (II)
Granichar Svilengrad (III)	3–0	Dobrudzha Dobrich (II)
Fearplay Varna (III)	3–0	Septemvri Sofia (II)
Septemvri Simitli (III)	0–1	Botev Vratsa (II)
Dulovo'98 (III)	3–2 (a.e.t.)	Slanchev Bryag Nesebar (II)
Stefanel Dupnitsa (III)	2–0	Akademik Svishtov (II)
Yunak Shumen (III)	0–4	Haskovo (II)
Edinstvo Gurkovo (III)	0–3	Dunav Ruse (II)
Planinets Apriltsi (III)	0–3	Metalurg Pernik (II)
Yambol (III)	2–1	Shumen (II)
Loviko Suhindol (III)	0–1	Svetkavitsa Targovishte (II)
Montana (III)	0–5	Spartak Pleven (II)
Venets Oreshets (III)	2–1	Bdin Vidin (II)

== Second round ==
In this round entered winners from the First Round together with the teams from A Group.

4 November 2000	Dunav Ruse (II)	4−1	Dorostol Silistra (II)	Ruse
11:00 EEST	Kirilov 19' (pen.); Kiskinov 41'; Kanev 50', 87'		Rafiev 90'	Stadium: Dunav; Attendance: 500

4 November 2000	Lokomotiv Ruse (III)	1−3	Neftochimic Burgas	Ruse
14:00 EEST	T. Hristov 29'		Mechedzhiev 25'; Chilikov 60'; Trendafilov 85'	Stadium: Gradski; Attendance: 4,000

4 November 2000	Granichar Svilengrad (III)	1−0	Chernomorets Burgas	Svilengrad
14:00 EEST	Tonchev 47'			Stadium: Kolodruma; Attendance: 6,000

4 November 2000	Svetkavitsa Targovishte (II)	2−3 (a.e.t.)	CSKA Sofia	Targovishte
14:00 EEST	Atanasov 41'; Barkanichkov 48'	report	Yanev 75'; Mirchev 78'; Bukarev 106'	Stadium: Dimitar Burkov; Attendance: 8,500

4 November 2000	Dulovo'98 (III)	1−6	Lokomotiv Sofia	Dulovo
14:00 EEST	Shaban 25'		G. Peev 20' (pen.); Gargorov 34'; Dafchev 44', 64'; Mukansi 58'; D. Genchev 78'	Stadium: Gradski; Attendance: 2,000

4 November 2000	Hebar Pazardzhik	5−1	Botev Vratsa (II)	Pazardzhik
14:00 EEST	V. Ivanov 42'; R. Petrov 53'; Nonchev 56'; Tonov 69'; Todorov 75' (pen.)		Georgiev 81'	Stadium: Georgi Benkovski; Attendance: 1,000

4 November 2000	Spartak Pleven (II)	3−1	Slavia Sofia	Pleven
14:00 EEST	Atsarov 5'; T. Kolev 25'; Podvarzachov 48'		Marinković 56'	Stadium: Slavi Aleksiev; Attendance: 12,000

4 November 2000	Pirin Blagoevgrad (II)	2−0	Vidima-Rakovski (II)	Blagoevgrad
14:00 EEST	Lyaskov 47'; Kaptiev 60'			Stadium: Hristo Botev; Attendance: 700

4 November 2000	Marek Dupnitsa (II)	1−2	Velbazhd Kyustendil	Dupnitsa
14:00 EEST	Stoynov 90'		Paskov 78'; Stoynev 84'	Stadium: Bonchuk; Attendance: 10,000

4 November 2000	Yambol (III)	1−2	Beroe Stara Zagora	Yambol
14:00 EEST	Gerdzhikov 62'		Salabashev 39'; Belchev 81'	Stadium: Laskov; Attendance: 3,000

4 November 2000	Fairplay Varna (III)	2−3	Spartak Varna	Varna
14:00 EEST	Radomirov 33', 39'		Bogdanov 19', 53'; An. Petrov 25'	Stadium: Korabostroitel; Attendance: 1,000

4 November 2000	Venets Oreshets (III)	1−8	Litex Lovech	Gara Oreshets
14:00 EEST	Predov 88' (pen.)		Bachev 32'; Todorov 48', 55', 57'; Pătrașcu 73'; Yovov 74'; Yurukov 82'; N. Dimitrov 86'	Stadium: Venets; Attendance: 1,000

4 November 2000	Metalurg Pernik (II)	1−0	Minyor Pernik	Pernik
14:00 EEST	Milanov 104'			Stadium: Metalurg; Attendance: 700

4 November 2000	Sokol Markovo (III)	1−2	Levski Sofia	Markovo
14:00 EEST	Zaychev 21'; Zaychev (yellow card); Miliev (yellow card) (yellow-red card) 62'	report	Mihtarski 90+1'; Tsykhmeystruk 90+5'; Dragić (yellow card); Aleksandrov (yellow card)	Stadium: Kaloyanov Vrah; Attendance: 4,000; Referee: Apostol Apostolov (Simitli)

4 November 2000	Cherno More Varna	6−0	Haskovo (II)	Varna
14:00 EEST	B. Kolev 6'; Metushev 30'; Dimov 34'; G. Iliev 57', 75'; Teofoolu 65'			Stadium: Ticha; Attendance: 400

4 November 2000	Stefanel Dupnitsa (III)	1−5	Botev Plovdiv	Dupnitsa
14:00 EEST

== Third round ==
=== First legs ===
21 November 2000	Dunav Ruse (II)	0−1	Levski Sofia	Ruse
14:00 EEST		report	G. Ivanov 1'; Stankov (yellow card)	Stadium: Dunav; Attendance: 10,000

21 November 2000	Cherno More Varna	1−3	Spartak Pleven (II)	Varna
14:00 EEST	M. Petkov 74'		T. Kolev 35'; Panayotov 47'; E. Todorov 61'	Stadium: Ticha; Attendance: 600

22 November 2000	Beroe Stara Zagora	1−2	Botev Plovdiv	Stara Zagora
14:00 EEST	Mirchev 14'		E. Kurdov 69', 90'	Stadium: Beroe; Attendance: 4,800

22 November 2000	Velbazhd Kyustendil	3−0	Metalurg Pernik (II)	Kyustendil
14:00 EEST	Trajanov 37'; E. Yordanov 80'; Paskov 84'			Stadium: Osogovo; Attendance: 1,500

22 November 2000	Hebar Pazardzhik	3−1	Lokomotiv Sofia	Pazardzhik
14:00 EEST	Ignatov 4'; Marinov 20'; Tonov 51'		Mitov 45'	Stadium: Georgi Benkovski; Attendance: 2,500

22 November 2000	Spartak Varna	2−0	Pirin Blagoevgrad (II)	Varna
14:00 EEST	An. Petrov 30'; Nankov 34'			Stadium: Spartak; Attendance: 500

22 November 2000	Granichar Svilengrad (III)	2−3	Litex Lovech	Svilengrad
14:00 EEST	Kamburov 39'; Mihaylov 75'		Yurukov 34'; Todorov 45' (pen.); Simonović 66'	Stadium: Kolodruma; Attendance: 3,000

23 November 2000	CSKA Sofia	2−0	Neftochimic Burgas	Sofia
17:15 EEST	Deyanov 3'; Vidolov 56'	report		Stadium: Balgarska Armiya; Attendance: 6,500

=== Second legs ===
2 December 2000	Levski Sofia	3−0 (4−0 agg.)	Dunav Ruse (II)	Sofia
13:30 EEST	Mihtarski 34', 36', 40' (pen.)	report		Stadium: Georgi Asparuhov; Attendance: 2,000; Referee: Zhivko Dimitrov (Varna)

2 December 2000	Spartak Pleven (II)	4−0 (7−1 agg.)	Cherno More Varna	Pleven
13:30 EEST	T. Kolev 13'; E. Todorov 58'; Panayotov 77', 90'			Stadium: Slavi Aleksiev; Attendance: 2,000

2 December 2000	Botev Plovdiv	2−1 (4−2 agg.)	Beroe Stara Zagora	Plovdiv
13:30 EEST	B. Georgiev 6'; Simeonov 48'		Ivanov 72'	Stadium: Hristo Botev; Attendance: 3,000

2 December 2000	Metalurg Pernik (II)	1−1 (1−4 agg.)	Velbazhd Kyustendil	Pernik
13:30 EEST	Dragomirov 90'		Pl. Petrov 57'	Stadium: Metalurg; Attendance: 150

2 December 2000	Lokomotiv Sofia	3−0 (4−3 agg.)	Hebar Pazardzhik	Sofia
13:30 EEST	G. Peev 30' (pen.); D. Genchev 42'; Mukansi 68'			Stadium: Lokomotiv; Attendance: 4,000

2 December 2000	Pirin Blagoevgrad (II)	4−1 (4−3 agg.)	Spartak Varna	Blagoevgrad
13:30 EEST	Iliev 20', 78'; Andonov 53'; K. Markov 66' (pen.)		V. Stanchev 10'	Stadium: Hristo Botev; Attendance: 2,000

2 December 2000	Litex Lovech	8−0 (11−2 agg.)	Granichar Svilengrad (III)	Lovech
13:30 EEST	Zhelev 23'; Todorov 30', 35', 40', 75', 80'; Yurukov 86'; Mota 89'			Stadium: Gradski; Attendance: 1,000

2 December 2000	Neftochimic Burgas	3−1 (3−3 agg.)	CSKA Sofia	Burgas
17:00 EEST	Trendafilov 3'; Timnev 29'; Parushev 90'	report	Deyanov 13'	Stadium: Lazur; Attendance: 8,000

== Quarter-finals ==
=== First legs ===
24 February 2001	Litex Lovech	3−0	CSKA Sofia	Lovech
14:00 EEST	Yovov 42' (pen.); Zhelev 47'; Yurukov 90'	report		Stadium: Gradski; Attendance: 7,000

24 February 2001	Levski Sofia	4−0	Botev Plovdiv	Sofia
14:00 EEST	Pantelić 21'; G. Ivanov 26'; Stoilov 67', 81'; Z. Sirakov (yellow card); G. Ivanov (yellow card)	report	Minkov (yellow card); Karaslavov (yellow card); Krumov (yellow card)	Stadium: Georgi Asparuhov; Attendance: 7,000; Referee: Anton Getsov (Veliko Tarnovo)

7 March 2001	Lokomotiv Sofia	4−1	Pirin Blagoevgrad (II)	Sofia
15:00 EEST				Stadium: Lokomotiv; Attendance: 4,000

7 March 2001	Velbazhd Kyustendil	3−1	Spartak Pleven (II)	Kyustendil
15:00 EEST	Velichkov 12' (pen.); Jayeoba 39'; Paskov 55'		G. Ivanov 59'	Stadium: Osogovo; Attendance: 2,000

=== Second legs ===
4 April 2001	CSKA Sofia	1−0 (1−3 agg.)	Litex Lovech	Sofia
18:00 EEST	Manchev 62'	report		Stadium: Balgarska Armiya; Attendance: 9,000

4 April 2001	Botev Plovdiv	1−2 (1−6 agg.)	Levski Sofia	Plovdiv
16:00 EEST	Hvoynev 41' (pen.); Grivov (yellow card)	report	Gaúcho 12'; Pantelić 37'	Stadium: Hristo Botev; Attendance: 4,000; Referee: Kostadin Kostadinov

4 April 2001	Pirin Blagoevgrad (II)	1−3 (2−7 agg.)	Lokomotiv Sofia	Blagoevgrad
16:00 EEST	Kaptiev 47'		Donev 18'; Evtimov 20'; Radukanov 79'	Stadium: Hristo Botev; Attendance: 5,000

4 April 2001	Spartak Pleven (II)	3−3 (4−6 agg.)	Velbazhd Kyustendil	Pleven
16:00 EEST	T. Kolev 6', 89' (pen.); Panayotov 49'		Stoynev 10'; Pl. Petrov 16'; Genchev 24'	Stadium: Pleven; Attendance: 6,000

== Semi-finals ==
=== First legs ===
18 April 2001	Litex Lovech	4−0	Levski Sofia	Lovech
17:00 EEST	Yovov 8'; Janković 19'; Răchită 66'; Mota 90'; Yovov (yellow card); Petev (yellow card); Simonović (yellow card); Jelenković (yellow card); Zhelev (yellow card)	report	Stankov (yellow card); Topuzakov (yellow card); G. Ivanov (yellow card)	Stadium: Gradski; Attendance: 6,500; Referee: Anton Getsov (Veliko Tarnovo)

18 April 2001	Lokomotiv Sofia	1−1	Velbazhd Kyustendil	Sofia
17:00 EEST	Gargorov 61'		Stoychev 77'	Stadium: Lokomotiv; Attendance: 4,000

=== Second legs ===
2 May 2001	Levski Sofia	1−0 (1−4 agg.)	Litex Lovech	Sofia
18:00 EEST	Pantelić 39'; Ivankov (yellow card); Topuzakov (yellow card); Telkiyski (yellow card)	report	Vutov (yellow card); Zhelev (yellow card); Simonović (yellow card); Janković (yellow card)	Stadium: Georgi Asparuhov; Attendance: 7,000; Referee: Georgi Narlev (Silistra)

2 May 2001	Velbazhd Kyustendil	5−1 (6−2 agg.)	Lokomotiv Sofia	Kyustendil
17:00 EEST	Stoychev 5'; Goshev 45+1'; Stoynev 56'; Genchev 71'; Dyankov 90'	report	Donev 20'; Mukansi (red card) 66'	Stadium: Osogovo; Attendance: 6,000

== Final ==
=== Details ===
24 May 2001
17:00 EEST

Litex Lovech	1–0 (a.e.t.)	Velbazhd Kyustendil
Yurukov 91'

Stadion Lokomotiv, Sofia
Attendance: 8,000
Referee: Anton Genov (Gabrovo)

Litex	Velbazhd
