= 2001 Bulgarian Cup final =

- Event: 2000–01 Bulgarian Cup
Litex	Velbazhd
A Group	A Group
1	0
- Date: 24 May 2001
- Venue: Stadion Lokomotiv, Sofia
- Man of the Match: Stefan Yurukov
- Referee: Anton Genov
- Attendance: 8,000

The 2001 Bulgarian Cup final was played at Stadion Lokomotiv in Sofia on 24 May 2001 and was contested between the sides of Litex Lovech and Velbazhd Kyustendil. The match was won by Litex Lovech, with Stefan Yurukov scoring the golden goal in the 91st minute.

== Match ==
=== Details ===
24 May 2001
17:00 EEST

Litex Lovech	1–0 (a.e.t.)	Velbazhd Kyustendil
Yurukov 91'

Stadion Lokomotiv, Sofia
Attendance: 8,000
Referee: Anton Genov (Gabrovo)

Litex	Velbazhd

Litex:
GK	1	(Bulgaria) Vitomir Vutov (c)
DF	5	(Romania) Bogdan Pătraşcu (yellow card) (substituted off) 80'
DF	3	(Bulgaria) Zhivko Zhelev
DF	17	(Romania) Valeriu Răchită
DF	4	(Bulgaria) Valentin Naydenov (substituted off) 3'
MF	23	(Federal Republic of Yugoslavia) Nebojša Jelenković
MF	14	(Bulgaria) Kiril Nikolov
MF	15	(Federal Republic of Yugoslavia) Dragoljub Simonović (yellow card)
MF	11	(Bulgaria) Hristo Yovov
FW	9	(Bulgaria) Stefan Yurukov
FW	21	(Federal Republic of Yugoslavia) Zoran Janković
Substitutes:
DF	2	(Bulgaria) Stanislav Bachev (substituted in) 3'
MF	10	(Bulgaria) Ivaylo Petev (substituted in) 80'
Manager:
(Bulgaria) Ferario Spasov Assistant referees: (Bulgaria) Lozev (Bulgaria) Petrov

Velbazhd:
GK	32	(Bulgaria) Krasimir Petkov
DF	2	(Bulgaria) Trayan Dyankov
DF	24	(Bulgaria) Ivan Paskov
DF	5	(Bulgaria) Petar Kolev
DF	6	(Bulgaria) Georgi Petrov
MF	16	(Bulgaria) Ivan Stoychev (red card) 3'
MF	8	(Bulgaria) Stanislav Genchev
MF	22	(North Macedonia) Vančo Trajanov
MF	10	(Bulgaria) Slavcho Pavlov (c)
FW	13	(Bulgaria) Metodi Stoynev
FW	20	(Bulgaria) Boyko Velichkov (substituted off) 56'
Substitutes:
FW	7	(Bulgaria) Plamen Petrov (substituted in) 56'
Manager:
(Bulgaria) Dimitar Dimitrov

== See also ==
- 2000–01 A Group
