= 2004 Bulgarian Supercup =

Lokomotiv Plovdiv	Litex Lovech
A Group	A Group
1	0
- Date: 31 July 2004
- Venue: Lazur, Burgas, Bulgaria
- Referee: Anton Genov (Gabrovo)
- Attendance: 4,500

The 2004 Bulgarian Supercup was the second Bulgarian Supercup match, a football match which was contested between the 2003–04 A Group champion, Lokomotiv Plovdiv, and the winner of the 2004 Bulgarian Cup Final, Litex Lovech. The match was held on 31 July 2004 at the Lazur Stadium in Burgas, Bulgaria. Lokomotiv beat Litex 1–0 to win their first Bulgarian Supercup.

== Match details ==
31 July 2004
20:00 EEST

Lokomotiv Plovdiv	1–0	Litex Lovech
Paskov 90+1'

Lazur Stadium, Burgas
Attendance: 4,500
Referee: Anton Genov (Gabrovo)

Lokomotiv Plovdiv	Litex Lovech

Lokomotiv Plovdiv:
GK	12	(Bulgaria) Stoyan Kolev
DF	2	(Bulgaria) Vladimir Ivanov (substituted off) 13'
DF	3	(Bulgaria) Aleksandar Tunchev
DF	24	(North Macedonia) Robert Petrov
DF	6	(Bulgaria) Kiril Kotev
MF	19	(Bulgaria) Krasimir Dimitrov
MF	20	(Bulgaria) Ivan Paskov (c)
MF	7	(Bulgaria) Georgi Iliev
MF	25	(Serbia and Montenegro) Ivan Krizmanić
FW	10	(North Macedonia) Boban Jančevski (substituted off) 46'
FW	11	(Bulgaria) Martin Kamburov
Substitutes:
GK	69	(Bulgaria) Krasimir Petkov
FW	13	(Bulgaria) Metodi Stoynev (substituted in) 13' (substituted off) 83'
MF	14	(Bulgaria) Velko Hristev
MF	16	(Bulgaria) Ivo Mihaylov (substituted in) 83'
DF	17	(Bulgaria) Nedyalko Hubenov
MF	18	(Serbia and Montenegro) Neško Milovanović
FW	23	(Nigeria) Ekundayo Jayeoba (substituted in) 46'
Manager:
(Bulgaria) Eduard Eranosyan

Litex Lovech:
GK	1	(Bulgaria) Vitomir Vutov
DF	2	(Bulgaria) Stanislav Bachev
DF	10	(Bulgaria) Zhivko Zhelev (c)
DF	17	(Bulgaria) Zlatomir Zagorčić (yellow card) 48'
DF	20	(Bulgaria) Ivan Bandalovski
MF	14	(Bulgaria) Kiril Nikolov
MF	18	(Morocco) Mourad Hdiouad (substituted off) 80'
MF	19	(Romania) Eugen Trică
MF	23	(Serbia and Montenegro) Nebojša Jelenković (substituted off) 80'
FW	9	(Brazil) Joãozinho
FW	11	(Bulgaria) Dimcho Belyakov
Substitutes:
GK	12	(Bulgaria) Stoyan Stavrev
DF	6	(Bulgaria) Rosen Kirilov
DF	25	(Bulgaria) Mihail Venkov
DF	27	(Brazil) Tiago Silva
MF	28	(Bulgaria) Todor Palankov (substituted in) 80'
FW	29	(Bulgaria) Borislav Hazurov
MF	32	(Togo) Paul Adado (substituted in) 80'
Manager:
(Bulgaria) Stoycho Mladenov
