= Stoyan Stavrev =

Bulgarian footballer and coach

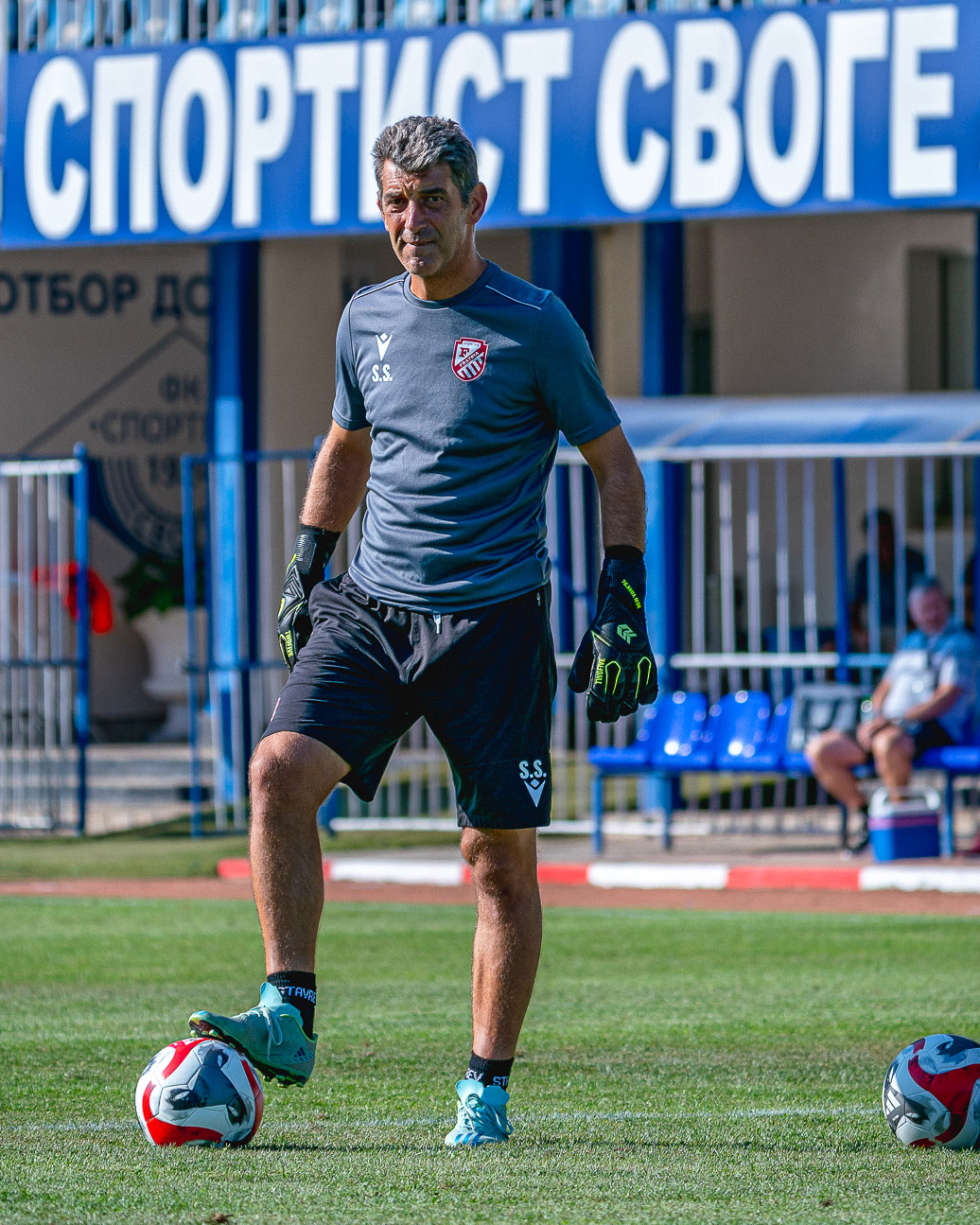

Personal information
- Full name: Stoyan Georgiev Stavrev
- Date of birth: 7 December 1975 (age 50)
- Place of birth: Topolovgrad, Bulgaria
- Height: 1.88 m (6 ft 2 in)
- Position: Goalkeeper

Youth career
- Haskovo

Senior career*
Years	Team	Apps	(Gls)
1995–1997	Haskovo		
1997–2004	Litex Lovech	76	(0)
2004–2007	Beroe Stara Zagora	56	(0)
2007–2012	Lokomotiv Plovdiv	63	(0)
2012	Cherno More	0	(0)
Total		195	(0)

Managerial career
- 2012–2020: Cherno More (goalkeeping coach)
- 2020–2021: Litex Lovech (goalkeeping coach)
- 2021–2022: Beroe (goalkeeping coach)
- 2023: Rozova Dolina (goalkeeping coach)
- 2023–2024: Chernomorets Balchik (goalkeeping coach)
- 2024: Fratria (goalkeeping coach)
- * Club domestic league appearances and goals

Stoyan Stavrev (Bulgarian: Стоян Ставрев; born 7 December 1975) is a former Bulgarian football goalkeeper, and currently the goalkeeping coach at Fratria.

== Career ==
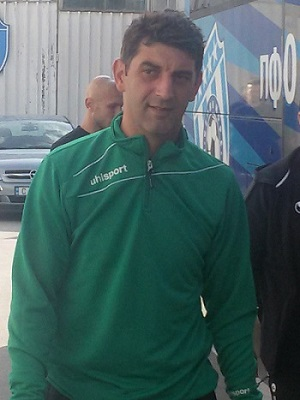
Stavrev with Cherno More in 2015.

Stavrev joined Litex Lovech in the summer of 1997. On 12 November 1997, he made his Litex debut in a 2–1 victory against Kremikovtsi in the Bulgarian Cup Second Round. Stavrev played 76 league matches in seven years for Litex's first team, as he was often the club's second-choice keeper behind Vitomir Vutov. In 2012, he became a goalkeeping coach at Cherno More, where he was also registered as an active player following an injury to Petar Denchev.

== Career statistics ==
Club	Season	League		Cup		Europe		Total	
Club	Season	Apps	Goals	Apps	Goals	Apps	Goals	Apps	Goals
Litex Lovech	1997–98	2	0	4	0	–	–	6	0
Litex Lovech	1998–99	12	0	6	0	3	0	21	0
Litex Lovech	1999–00	14	0	3	0	0	0	17	0
Litex Lovech	2000–01	8	0	2	0	–	–	10	0
Litex Lovech	2001–02	1	0	4	0	0	0	5	0
Litex Lovech	2002–03	24	0	6	0	3	0	33	0
Litex Lovech	2003–04	15	0	2	0	2	0	19	0
Beroe	2004–05	21	0	0	0	–	–	21	0
Beroe	2005–06	18	0	2	0	–	–	20	0
Beroe	2006–07	17	0	3	0	–	–	20	0
Lokomotiv Plovdiv	2007–08	21	0	2	0	–	–	23	0
Lokomotiv Plovdiv	2008–09	19	0	0	0	–	–	19	0
Lokomotiv Plovdiv	2009–10	16	0	1	0	–	–	17	0
Lokomotiv Plovdiv	2010–11	0	0	0	0	–	–	0	0
Lokomotiv Plovdiv	2011–12	7	0	2	0	–	–	9	0
Cherno More	2012–13	0	0	0	0	–	–	0	0
Career totals		195	0	37	0	8	0	240	0

== Honours ==
=== Club ===
Litex Lovech

- A Group (2): 1997–98, 1998–99
- Bulgarian Cup (2): 2001, 2004
