= Slavcho Pavlov =

Bulgarian footballer and manager

Personal information
- Date of birth: 17 May 1968 (age 58)
- Place of birth: Pernik, Bulgaria
- Height: 1.73 m (5 ft 8 in)
- Position: Midfielder

Senior career*
Years	Team	Apps	(Gls)
1985–1991	Minyor Pernik	158	(25)
1991–1993	Slavia Sofia	42	(4)
1993–1994	Lokomotiv Sofia		
1994–1996	Kayserispor	52	(10)
1996–1998	Lokomotiv Sofia		
1998–1999	Minyor Pernik	33	(3)
2000	Pietà Hotspurs		
2000–2001	Velbazhd Kyustendil		
2001–2003	Lokomotiv Plovdiv	39	(4)
2003–2005	Minyor Bobov Dol		

International career
	Bulgaria U21	6	(0)

Managerial career
- 2005–2007: Minyor Pernik (youth teams)
- 2007–2010: Minyor 1919
- * Club domestic league appearances and goals

Slacho Pavlov (Bulgarian: Славчо Павлов; born 17 May 1968) is a former Bulgarian professional footballer and manager.

== Career ==
Pavlov spent the majority of his professional career in Bulgarian football, while additionally having two spells abroad - in Turkey and Malta. With Velbazhd Kyustendil, he earned a bronze medal in the A PFG following the conclusion of the 2000/2001 season and also participated in the 2001 Bulgarian Cup Final, which his team lost by a score of 0:1. In total, Pavlov appeared in 306 matches in the top division of Bulgaria, scoring 29 goals. His son Tomislav Pavlov is also a footballer.
