= Stefan Yurukov =

Bulgarian footballer

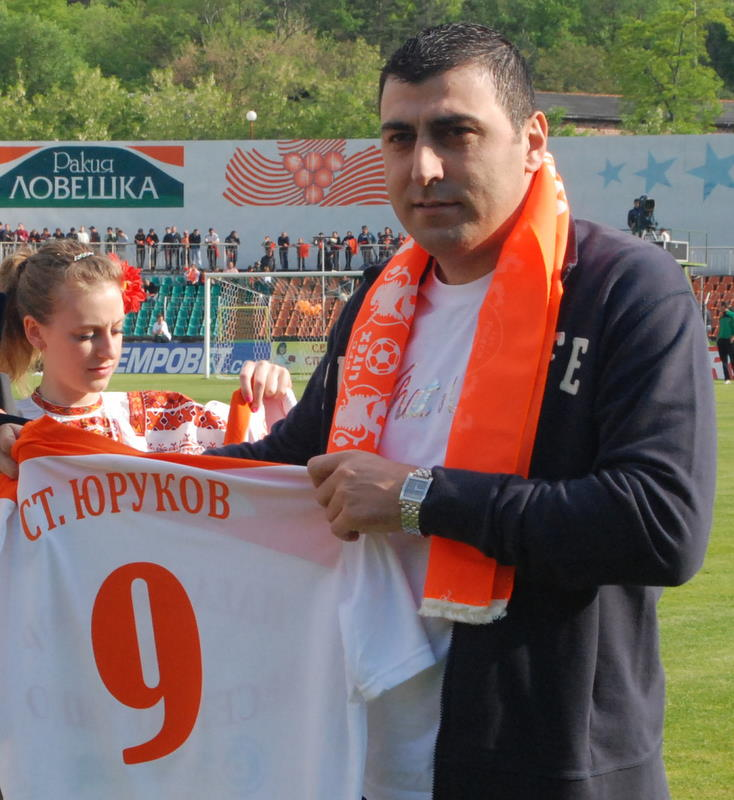

Personal information
- Full name: Stefan Nikolov Yurukov
- Date of birth: 16 June 1972 (age 54)
- Place of birth: Sofia, Bulgaria
- Height: 1.86 m (6 ft 1 in)
- Position: Forward

Senior career*
Years	Team	Apps	(Gls)
1990–1992	Levski Sofia	0	(0)
1990	→ Haskovo (loan)	3	(1)
1991	→ Bdin Vidin (loan)	17	(8)
1991–1992	→ Cherno More (loan)	6	(0)
1993–1994	Korabostroitel Ruse	12	(5)
1994	Etar Veliko Tarnovo	2	(0)
1994–1995	Velbazhd Kyustendil	12	(3)
1995–1996	Han Asparuh	32	(20)
1996–1997	Litex Lovech	43	(27)
1998	Gaziantepspor	4	(0)
1998–2002	Litex Lovech	89	(42)
1999–2000	→ Spartak Varna (loan)	13	(6)
2002	Cherno More	10	(5)
2003	Liaoning Whowin	14	(6)
2003–2004	Litex Lovech	16	(5)
2004	Rodopa Smolyan	8	(1)
2005	Tiela	11	(2)

International career
1999	Bulgaria	1	(0)
- * Club domestic league appearances and goals

Stefan Yurukov (Bulgarian: Стефан Юруков; born 16 June 1972) is a Bulgarian former footballer who played as a forward. After his retirement he switched to police work.

== Honours ==
Litex Lovech

- Bulgarian League: 1998–99
- Bulgarian Cup: 2000–01, 2003–04

Dalian Shide

- Chinese FA Super Cup: 2002
