= Stoycho Stoilov =

Bulgarian footballer

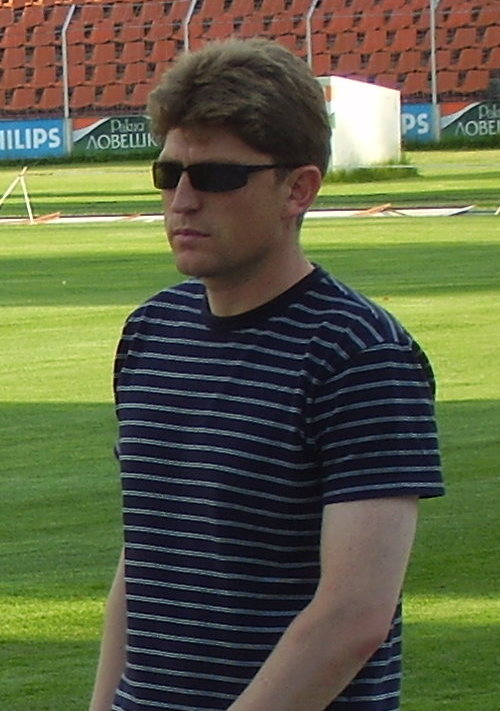

Personal information
- Date of birth: 15 October 1971 (age 55)
- Place of birth: Blagoevgrad, Bulgaria
- Height: 1.82 m (6 ft 0 in)
- Position: Midfielder

Senior career*
Years	Team	Apps	(Gls)
1989–1990	Pirin Blagoevgrad	18	(2)
1990–1992	CSKA Sofia	23	(2)
1992–1994	Pirin Blagoevgrad		
1994–1995	CSKA Sofia	25	(4)
1995–1996	Dobrudzha Dobrich		
1996–1999	Litex Lovech	54	(17)
1999–2002	1. FC Nürnberg	64	(7)
2002–2003	Litex Lovech	11	(1)

International career
1998–2001	Bulgaria	10	(1)
- * Club domestic league appearances and goals as of 15:27, 5 February 2009 (UTC)

Stoycho Stoilov (Bulgarian: Стойчо Стоилов; born 15 October 1971) is a Bulgarian former football midfielder.

== Club career ==
Stoilov was born in Blagoevgrad. In his career he played for Pirin Blagoevgrad, CSKA Sofia, Dobrudzha Dobrich and Litex Lovech, making a name for himself with the latter when they won their first two domestic titles in the late 1990s. He reached a Bulgarian Cup final with his hometown club, finishing as runner-up. Stoilov also had a spell with 1. FC Nürnberg in the German Bundesliga.

On 14 November 2002, Stoilov (who was at the time the captain of Litex Lovech and was suffering from a broken foot, which had occurred after being subjected to a tackle in a game against CSKA Sofia), was seriously wounded, sustaining life-threatening injuries, after being shot by former army serviceman Simeon Mechev, following a traffic dispute. Stoilov managed to recover after extensive treatment, but the incident effectively spelt the end of his playing career. The culprit was originally to spend 10 years in prison, but his sentence was eventually reduced to 6 years. Mechev was released from jail in August 2011 after remaining behind bars for approximately four years.

== International career ==
Stoilov earned his first cap for Bulgaria on 25 March 1998, in the 0:1 away loss against Macedonia in a friendly match, substituting Krasimir Balakov in the 73rd minute. He was in the Bulgarian squad at the 1998 FIFA World Cup, although he did not play in any games.

=== International goal ===
Scores and results list Bulgaria's goal tally first.

#	Date	Venue	Opponent	Score	Result	Competition
1.	22 April 1998	Vasil Levski National Stadium, Sofia, Bulgaria	Morocco	2–0	2–1	Friendly

== Administrative work ==
Following his retirement, Stoilov became part of the organizational management of Litex Lovech, continuing in this role with CSKA Sofia since 2016.

== Personal life ==
He has distant Greek roots and Litex Lovech helped him obtain a Greek passport under the name Stoykas Stoilas, so that Stoilov could be issued a work visa as a citizen of a European Union member state, potentially making it easier for him in the case of a transfer to a British club. In June 1999 Stoilov entered Germany with the document when he joined 1. FC Nürnberg. However, in 2001, a German court declared that the passport had been invalid and imposed an 8-month conditional sentence.

== Honours ==
=== Club ===
CSKA Sofia

- Bulgarian A Group: 1991–92

Litex Lovech

- Bulgarian A Group: 1997–98, 1998–99

1. FC Nürnberg

- 2. Bundesliga: 2000–01
