= Nikolay Dimitrov (footballer, born 1970) =

Bulgarian footballer

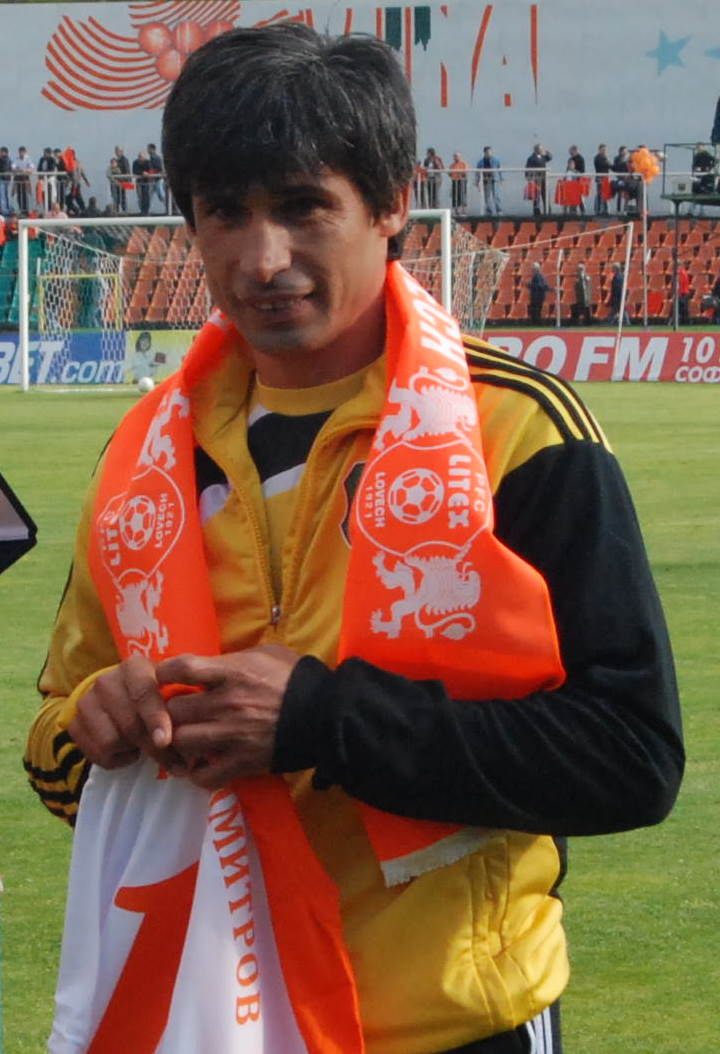

Personal information
- Date of birth: 4 November 1970 (age 55)
- Place of birth: Petrich, Bulgaria
- Height: 1.66 m (5 ft 5 1/2 in)
- Positions: Right back; right wing back

Senior career*
Years	Team	Apps	(Gls)
1988–1996	Belasitsa Petrich	141	(3)
1996–2005	Litex Lovech	178	(6)
Total		319	(9)

Managerial career
- 2006–2016: Litex Lovech (youth coach)
- 2016–2017: Belasitsa Petrich
- * Club domestic league appearances and goals

Nikolay Dimitrov-Džajić' (born 4 November 1970 in Petrich) is a Bulgarian former football player. He played as a right back and spent the majority of his career with Litex Lovech.

Born in Petrich, Dimitrov was a product of the Belasitsa Petrich system. He was signed by Litex Lovech in 1996 and spent the remainder of his career with the club. He spent nine seasons of his career at Litex, before retiring at the age of 35 in 2005. During that period, Dimitrov won two A PFG titles and two Bulgarian Cups. He had played 241 games in all competitions for Litex, scoring seven goals.

Dimtrov was head coach of Belasitsa in the 2016–17 South-West Third League but stepped down in June 2017.

== Litex statistics ==
Club	Season	League		Cup		Europe		Total	
Club	Season	Apps	Goals	Apps	Goals	Apps	Goals	Apps	Goals
Litex Lovech	1996–97	15	0	4	0	–	–	19	0
Litex Lovech	1997–98	24	1	3	0	–	–	27	1
Litex Lovech	1998–99	22	0	7	0	5	0	34	0
Litex Lovech	1999–00	28	1	2	0	4	0	34	1
Litex Lovech	2000–01	16	1	7	1	–	–	23	2
Litex Lovech	2001–02	25	0	4	0	6	0	35	0
Litex Lovech	2002–03	14	2	6	0	2	0	22	2
Litex Lovech	2003–04	23	1	8	0	2	0	33	1
Litex Lovech	2004–05	11	0	1	0	2	0	14	0
Career totals		178	6	42	1	21	0	241	7

== Honours ==
=== Club ===
Litex Lovech

- A PFG: 1997–98, 1998–99
- Bulgarian Cup: 2001, 2004
