= 1994–95 B Group =

B Group
- Season: 1994–95
- Champions: Spartak Varna (North); Levski Kyustendil (South)
- Promoted: Spartak Varna; Levski Kyustendil; Rakovski Ruse
- Relegated: Botev Novi Pazar; Svetkavitsa; Dorostol; Provadia; Lesicheri; Lokomotiv Vidin; Preslav; Akademik Svishtov; Chernomorets; Marek; Metalik; Sliven; Nesebar; Dimitrovgrad; Pirin Gotse Delchev; Rilski Sportist

The 1994–95 B Group was the 39th season of the Bulgarian B Football Group, the second tier of the Bulgarian football league system.

A total of 32 teams contested the league: 16 in the North B Group and 16 in the South B Group. Spartak Varna finished top of the North Group and Levski Kyustendil finished top of the South Group. Rakovski Ruse were promoted through the play-off.

== North B Group ==
Pos	Team	Pld	W	D	L	GF	GA	GD	Pts	Promotion or relegation
1	Spartak Varna (P)	30	19	8	3	69	19	+50	65	Promotion to 1995–96 A Group
2	Rakovski Ruse (P)	30	19	8	3	63	21	+42	65	Qualification for Promotion play-off
3	Dunav Ruse	30	18	5	7	58	22	+36	59	
4	Storgozia Pleven	30	18	5	7	60	39	+21	59	
5	Korabostroitel Ruse	30	18	3	9	67	32	+35	57	
6	Chardafon Gabrovo	30	14	7	9	44	28	+16	49	
7	Cherno More Varna	30	15	3	12	43	38	+5	48	
8	Spartak Pleven	30	14	3	13	42	34	+8	45	
9	Botev Novi Pazar (R)	30	13	5	12	38	33	+5	44	Relegation to 1995–96 V Group
10	Svetkavitsa Targovishte (R)	30	10	7	13	35	34	+1	37	Relegation to 1995–96 V Group
11	Dorostol Silistra (R)	30	9	7	14	31	44	−13	34	Relegation to 1995–96 V Group
12	Provadia (R)	30	10	3	17	36	67	−31	33	Relegation to 1995–96 V Group
13	Lesicheri (R)	30	7	5	18	27	69	−42	26	Relegation to 1995–96 V Group
14	Lokomotiv Vidin (R)	30	6	3	21	25	67	−42	21	Relegation to 1995–96 V Group
15	Preslav (R)	30	5	5	20	27	71	−44	20	Relegation to 1995–96 V Group
16	Akademik Svishtov (R)	30	4	5	21	25	72	−47	17	Relegation to 1995–96 V Group

Source: futbolbg.dir.bg
Rules for classification: 1) points; 2) goal difference; 3) number of goals scored.
(P) Promoted; (R) Relegated

== South B Group ==
Pos	Team	Pld	W	D	L	GF	GA	GD	Pts	Promotion or relegation
1	Levski Kyustendil (P)	30	21	4	5	71	24	+47	67	Promotion to 1995–96 A Group
2	Maritsa Plovdiv	30	16	7	7	49	22	+27	55	Qualification for Promotion play-off
3	Akademik Sofia	30	14	9	7	41	29	+12	51	
4	Septemvri Sofia	30	15	5	10	50	28	+22	50	
5	Haskovo	30	16	1	13	59	37	+22	49	
6	Hebar Pazardzhik	30	14	6	10	42	35	+7	48	
7	Chirpan	30	14	5	11	45	31	+14	47	
8	Belasitsa Petrich	30	14	5	11	43	39	+4	47	
9	Chernomorets Burgas (R)	30	13	7	10	43	35	+8	46	Relegation to 1995–96 V Group
10	Marek Dupnitsa (R)	30	13	2	15	30	48	−18	41	Relegation to 1995–96 V Group
11	Metalik Sopot (R)	30	9	7	14	28	35	−7	34	Relegation to 1995–96 V Group
12	Sliven (R)	30	10	2	18	31	58	−27	32	Relegation to 1995–96 V Group
13	Nesebar (R)	30	9	4	17	27	46	−19	31	Relegation to 1995–96 V Group
14	Dimitrovgrad (R)	30	9	4	17	32	51	−19	31	Relegation to 1995–96 V Group
15	Pirin Gotse Delchev (R)	30	9	2	19	30	62	−32	29	Relegation to 1995–96 V Group
16	Rilski Sportist (R)	30	6	6	18	27	68	−41	24	Relegation to 1995–96 V Group

Source: futbolbg.dir.bg
Rules for classification: 1) points; 2) goal difference; 3) number of goals scored.
(P) Promoted; (R) Relegated

== Promotion play-off ==
Rakovski Ruse	3–2	Maritsa Plovdiv
Popivanov 20'; Kirilov 45'; Teofoolu 90'	Report	Chomakov 26'; Tosev 40'

Vasil Levski National Stadium
Attendance: 2,000
Referee: Kostadin Gerginov
