= Ferario Spasov =

Bulgarian football coach (1962–2023)

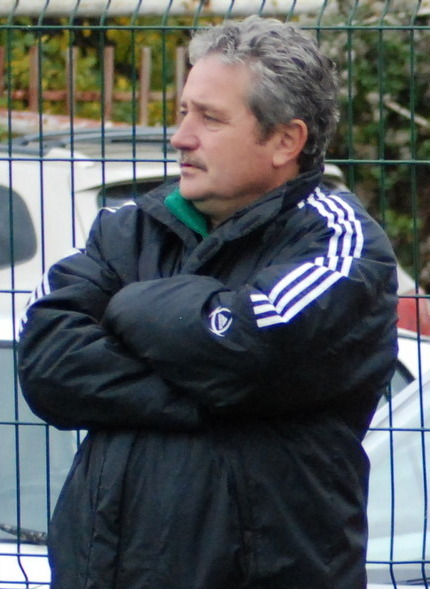
- Spasov in 2009

Personal information
- Full name: Ferario Ivanov Spasov
- Date of birth: 20 February 1962
- Place of birth: Dupnitsa, Bulgaria
- Date of death: 11 November 2023 (aged 61)
- Position: Midfielder

Senior career*
Years	Team	Apps	(Gls)
1979–1983	Osam Lovech	70	(5)
1983–1986	Spartak Pleven	69	(6)
1986–1993	Osam Lovech		

Managerial career
- 1996: Olimpik Teteven
- 1997: Spartak Varna
- 1998–1999: Litex Lovech
- 2000–2003: Litex Lovech
- 2004: CSKA Sofia
- 2006: Dunav Ruse
- 2007: Litex Lovech
- 2008–2011: Bulgaria U17
- 2012: Botev Plovdiv
- 2014–2015: Montana
- 2016: Etar
- 2016: Spartak Pleven
- 2016–2017: Beroe
- 2017–2019: Montana
- 2019–2020: Botev Plovdiv
- 2021: Levski Lom
- 2022–2023: Montana
- 2023: Dunav Lom
- * Club domestic league appearances and goals

Ferario Spasov (Bulgarian: Ферарио Спасов; 20 February 1962 – 11 November 2023) was a Bulgarian football coach and player.

== Managerial career ==
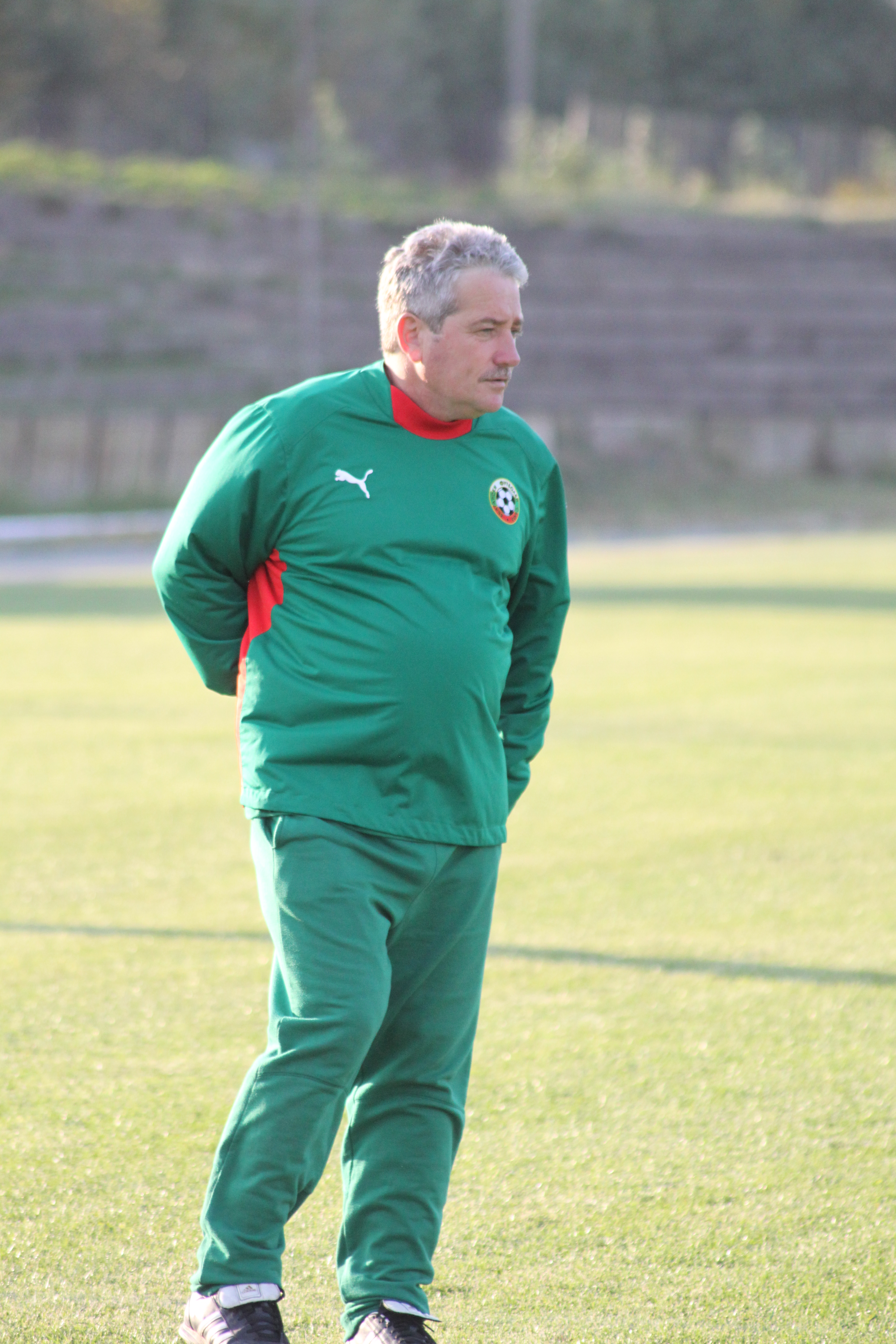
Spasov with Bulgaria U17

Spasov was manager of Litex Lovech and CSKA Sofia.

From 1 April 2016 he became the manager of Etar Veliko Tarnovo after Boncho Genchev secured the position of chairman of the zonal council of BFU in Veliko Tarnovo.

On 26 October 2016, Spasov was appointed manager of Beroe but his contract was terminated by mutual consent after the final game of the season.

On 28 August 2017, Spasov was appointed manager of Montana.

On 8 October 2019, Spasov replaced Željko Petrović as a manager of Botev Plovdiv.

== Death ==
Spasov died in a car accident on 11 November 2023 at the age of 61.

== Honours ==
Litex Lovech

- Bulgarian A Group: 1998–99
- Bulgarian Cup: 2000–01
