= Anatoli Tonov =

Bulgarian footballer and manager

Personal information
- Full name: Anatoli Georgiev Tonov
- Date of birth: 19 September 1968 (age 58)
- Place of birth: Sofia, Bulgaria
- Height: 1.79 m (5 ft 10 1/2 in)
- Position: Forward

Youth career
- CSKA Sofia

Senior career*
Years	Team	Apps	(Gls)
1988–1990	Chavdar Byala Slatina	23	(12)
1990–1993	Montana	95	(44)
1993–1995	Spartak Plovdiv	55	(18)
1995–1996	Montana	29	(11)
1996–1997	Levski Sofia	26	(6)
1999	Shanghai Pudong		
2000	Wuhan Hongtao		
2000–2001	Hebar Pazardzhik	18	(4)
2001	Belasitsa Petrich	5	(2)
2002	Botev Plovdiv	2	(0)
2002	Spartak Varna	3	(1)
2002–2003	Rodopa Smolyan	24	(4)
2003	Vidima Rakovski	1	(1)
2003–2005	Minyor Bobov Dol	29	(11)
2005	Hebar Pazardzhik	6	(1)

Managerial career
- 2005–2006: Hebar Pazardzhik (assistant)
- 2007–2008: Chavdar Byala Slatina
- 2009: Botev Krivodol
- 2009: Botev Krivodol (assistant)
- 2010–2011: Botev Kozloduy
- 2013–2014: Lyubimets (assistant)
- 2014: Haskovo (assistant)
- 2015: Botev Kozloduy
- 2016: Lokomotiv Mezdra
- 2016: Pirin Gotse Delchev
- 2016–2017: Parva Atomna
- 2018–2020: Sevlievo
- 2021–2022: Levski Lom
- * Club domestic league appearances and goals

Anatoli Tonov (Bulgarian: Анатоли Тонов; born 19 September 1968) is a former Bulgarian footballer who last managed Levski Lom.

== Career ==
A native of Sofia, Tonov played for professional teams in the A PFG and B PFG as well as in the V AFG. He also had spells in South Korea and China. Between 1996 and 1998, Tonov was part of the Levski Sofia squad, reaching a Bulgarian Cup final in 1997. In November 2021, Tonov was promoted to head coach of Levski Lom after Ivaylo Vasilev was released from his duties. He remained in that position until mid March 2022 when the management decided to discontinue the team's participation in professional football.
