= Dimcho Belyakov =

Bulgarian footballer (born 1971)

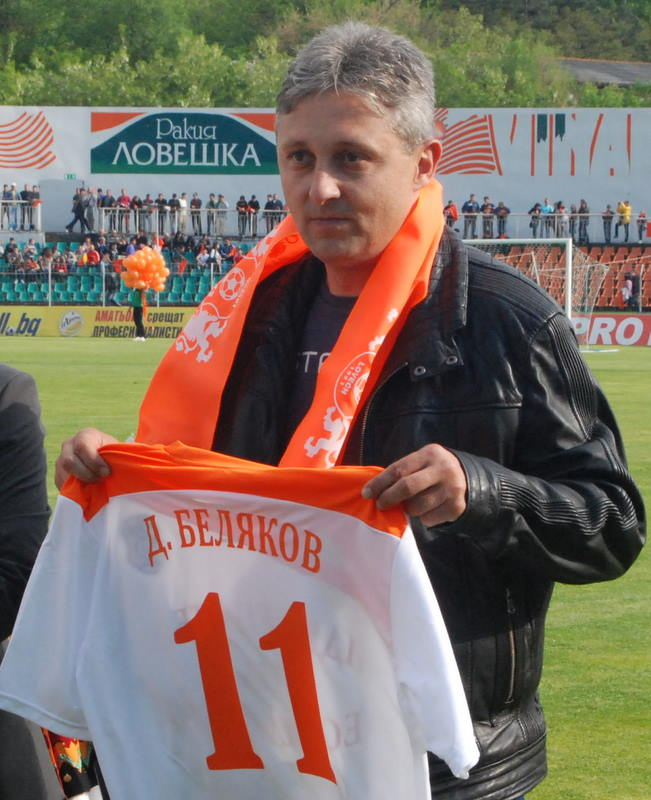
- Dimcho Belyakov in 2010

Personal information
- Date of birth: 6 October 1971 (age 55)
- Place of birth: Gotse Delchev, Bulgaria
- Height: 1.79 m (5 ft 10 in)
- Position: Striker

Senior career*
Years	Team	Apps	(Gls)
1990–1991	Pirin Gotse Delchev	12	(2)
1991–1992	Pirin Blagoevgrad	17	(3)
1992–1994	Belasitsa Petrich	43	(16)
1994–1997	Litex Lovech	89	(47)
1998	Gaziantepspor	23	(10)
1998–1999	Litex Lovech	26	(21)
1999–2001	1. FC Nürnberg	47	(18)
2001–2003	Rot-Weiß Oberhausen	64	(18)
2004	Litex Lovech	28	(9)
2005–2008	Brestnik	53	(38)
Total		402	(182)

International career
1997–1998	Bulgaria	2	(0)
- * Club domestic league appearances and goals

Dimcho Belyakov (Bulgarian: Димчо Беляков; born 6 October 1971 in Gotse Delchev) is a former Bulgarian footballer who played as a forward. In the late 1990s he also received a call-up to the Bulgaria national team. In this time Belyakov made his debut under manager Hristo Bonev against Slovakia on 11 March 1997.

== Honours ==
- Bulgarian League champion: 1997–98, 1998–99
- Bulgarian Cup winner: 2003–04
- Bulgarian League top scorer: 1998–99 (21 goals)
- Bulgarian Cup finalist: 1998–99
