= Plamen Petrov =

Bulgarian footballer

Personal information
- Date of birth: 6 September 1985 (age 41)
- Place of birth: Radnevo, Bulgaria
- Height: 1.86 m (6 ft 1 in)
- Position: Goalkeeper

Youth career
- Levski Sofia

Senior career*
Years	Team	Apps	(Gls)
2004–2006	Rilski Sportist	46	(0)
2006–2007	Rodopa Smolyan	17	(0)
2007–2011	Beroe Stara Zagora	15	(0)
2011	Vereya Stara Zagora	0	(0)
- * Club domestic league appearances and goals as of 5 June 2011

Plamen Petrov (Bulgarian: Пламен Петров; born 6 September 1985) is a Bulgarian football player. He currently plays for Vereya Stara Zagora as a goalkeeper.

== Honours ==
=== Club ===
- Beroe
  - Bulgarian Cup:
    - Winner: 2009-10
