= Trayan Dyankov =

Bulgarian footballer and manager

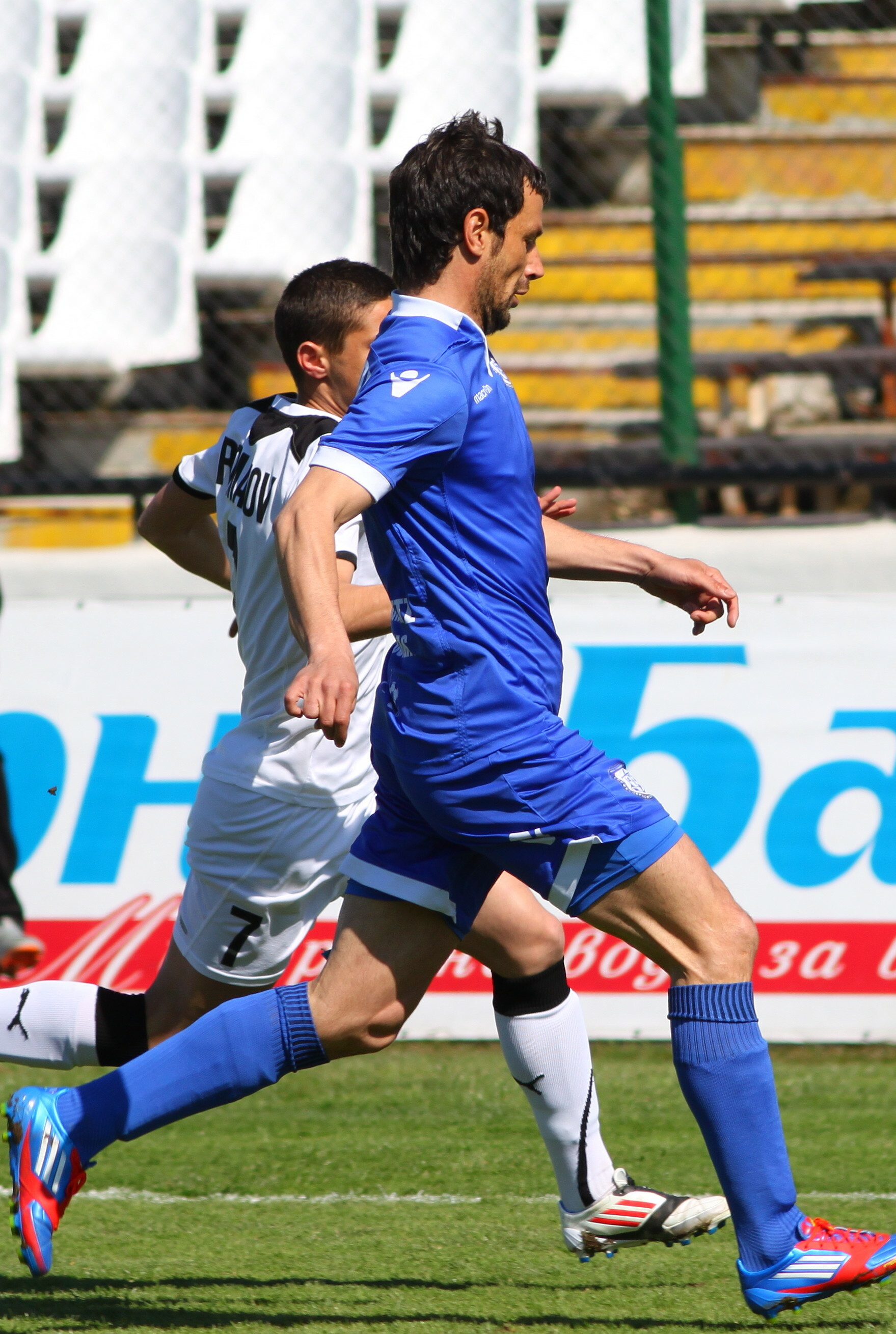

Personal information
- Full name: Trayan Kolev Dyankov
- Date of birth: 21 June 1976
- Place of birth: Varna, Bulgaria
- Date of death: 1 August 2016 (aged 40)
- Place of death: Varna, Bulgaria
- Height: 1.81 m (5 ft 11 in)
- Position: Defender

Senior career*
Years	Team	Apps	(Gls)
1993–2000	Spartak Varna	90	(4)
2000–2001	Velbazhd Kyustendil	21	(0)
2001–2004	Lokomotiv Plovdiv	52	(3)
2004	Dynamo Makhachkala	2	(0)
2005–2006	Spartak Varna	24	(2)
2006–2013	Chernomorets Burgas	175	(5)
2013	Chernomorets Balchik	1	(0)
2013	FC Obzor	7	(0)
2014	Spartak 1918	13	(0)
2014–2016	Kaliakra Kavarna	47	(4)
Total		432	(18)

Managerial career
- 2014: Spartak 1918 (playing coach)
- 2016: Spartak Varna
- * Club domestic league appearances and goals

Trayan Kolev Dyankov (Bulgarian: Траян Дянков; 21 June 1976 – 1 August 2016) was a Bulgarian football defender and manager of Spartak Varna. He was a right or central defender, and began his career in Spartak Varna's youth teams.

== Career ==
Born in Varna, Dyankov started to play football in the local club Spartak Varna. He made his first-team debut on 10 April 1994 in an A PFG match against Slavia Sofia as an 86th-minute substitute.

After that played in Velbazhd Kyustendil and Lokomotiv Plovdiv. During the 2003/04 season he won the top Bulgarian league, the A PFG, with Loko Plovdiv.

In June 2006, Dyankov joined Chernomorets Burgas. With the club he played in the matches of Intertoto Cup 2008 against Slovenian ND Gorica and Swiss Grasshopper Club Zurich. On 15 January 2011, it was announced that Chernomorets had renewed the contract of Dyankov, extending it until 30 June 2012.

== Personal life ==
Dyankov married in 2009. He died at the age of 40 on 1 August 2016 in Varna after suffering a suspected heart attack while exercising.

== Honours ==
PFC Lokomotiv Plovdiv

- Champion of Bulgaria: 2004
- Bulgarian Supercup: 2004
