= Mitko Trendafilov =

Bulgarian footballer

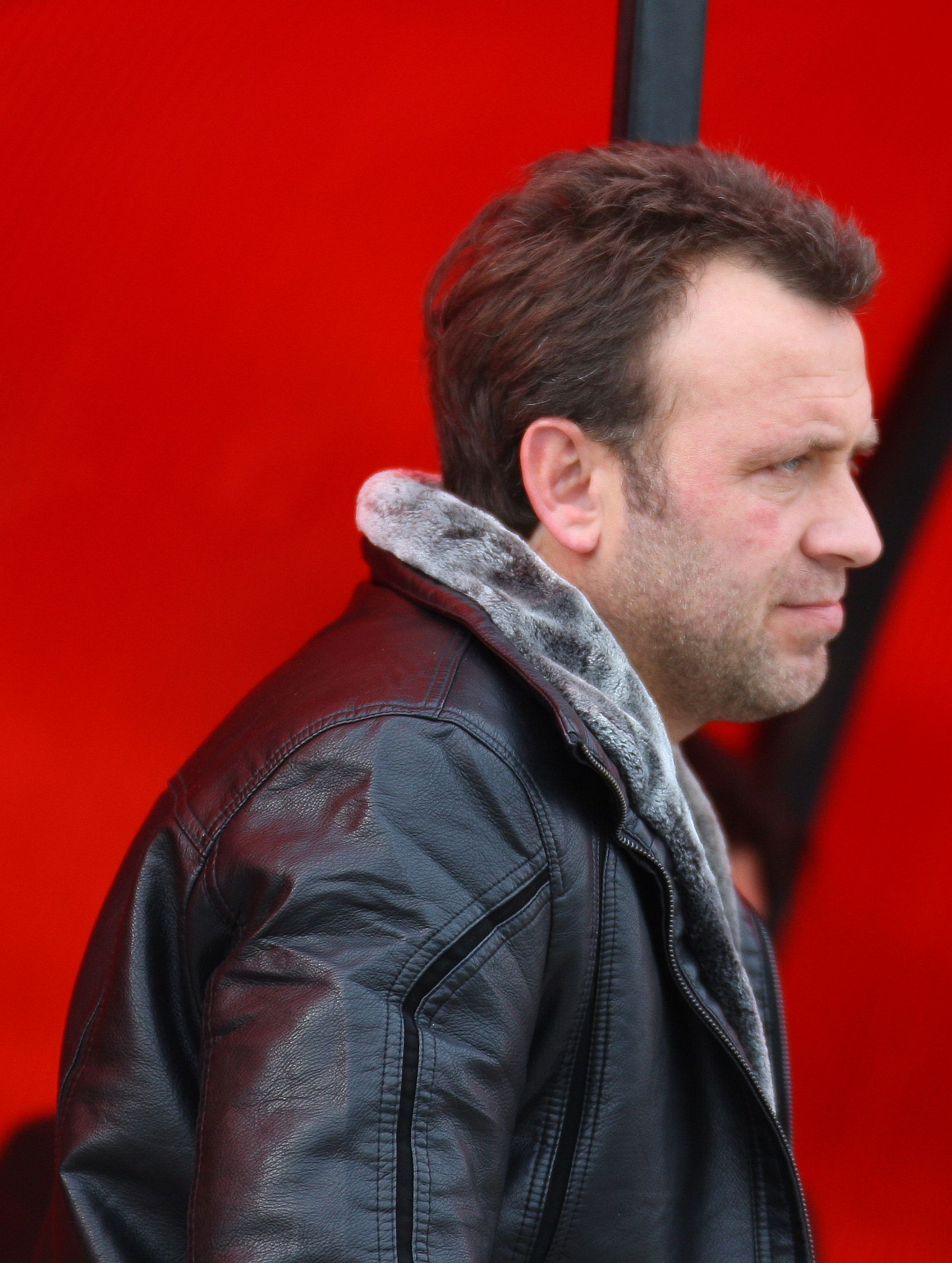

Personal information
- Full name: Mitko Trendafilov Ivanov
- Date of birth: 25 December 1969 (age 56)
- Place of birth: Dimitrovgrad, PR Bulgaria
- Height: 5 ft 9 in (1.75 m)
- Position: Attacking midfielder

Senior career*
Years	Team	Apps	(Gls)
1989–1993	Dimitrovgrad	68	(20)
1993–1998	Naftex Burgas	119	(18)
1999	CSKA Sofia	11	(1)
1999–2001	Naftex Burgas	40	(6)
2001–2002	Lokomotiv Plovdiv	29	(5)
2002–2004	Naftex Burgas	44	(3)
2004	Nesebar	8	(1)
2004–2005	Marsaxlokk	17	(2)
2005–2007	Chernomorets Burgas	40	(16)
2007–2008	Naftex Burgas	20	(1)
2008–2009	Nesebar	13	(0)
2009–2011	Neftochimic 1986	37	(19)
Total		446	(92)

International career
1996–2002	Bulgaria	5	(0)
- * Club domestic league appearances and goals

Mitko Trendafilov Ivanov (Bulgarian: Митко Трендафилов Иванов; born 25 December 1969) is a Bulgarian former professional footballer who played as a midfielder.
