= Dragoljub Simonović (footballer) =

Bulgarian footballer

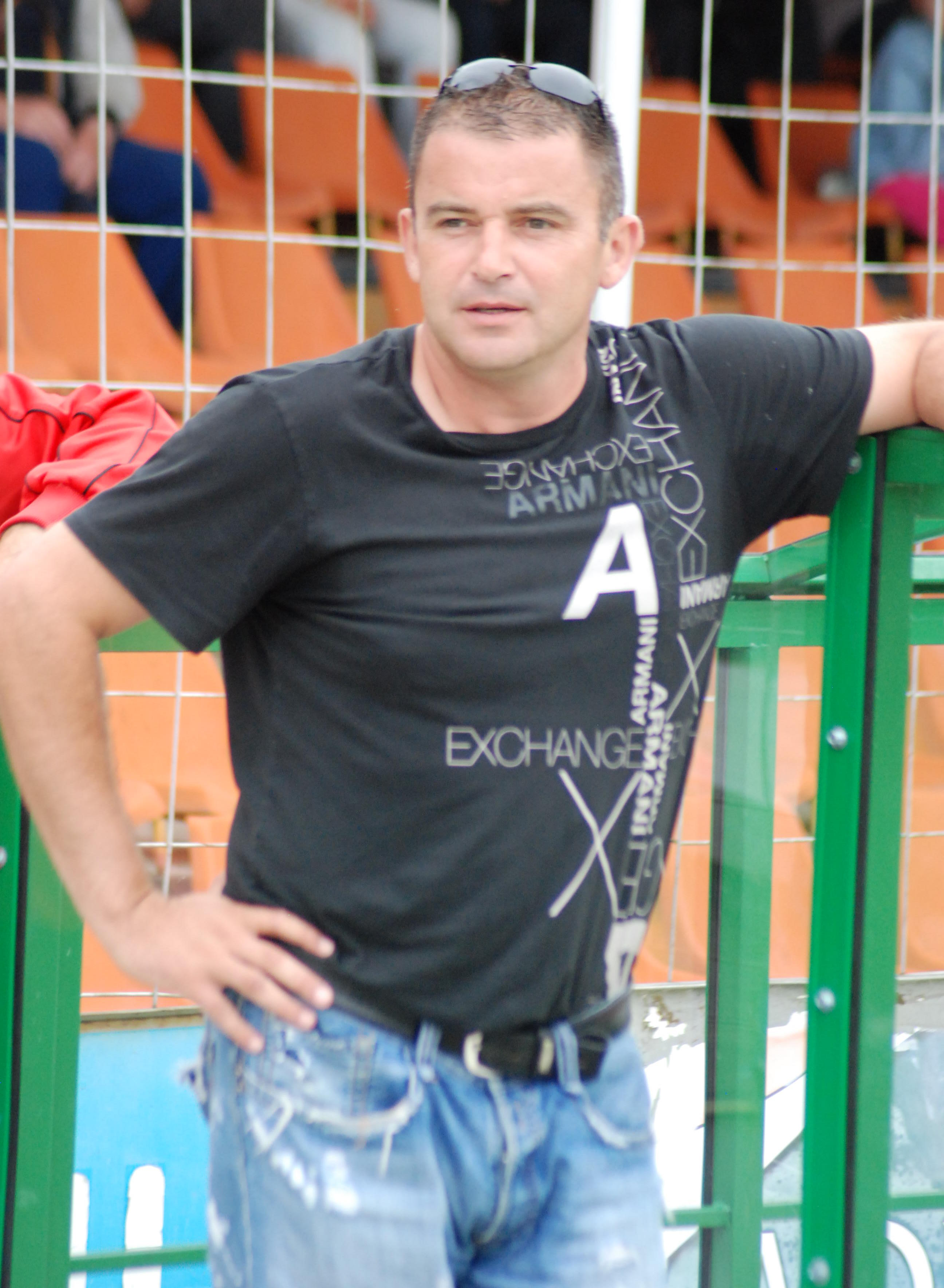

Personal information
- Date of birth: 30 October 1972 (age 53)
- Place of birth: Belgrade, SR Serbia, SFR Yugoslavia
- Height: 1.79 m (5 ft 10 in)
- Position: Attacking midfielder

Senior career*
Years	Team	Apps	(Gls)
1994–1995	Hajduk Kula	14	(3)
1997–2001	Litex Lovech	55	(24)
2001–2002	CSKA Sofia	1	(0)

International career
1998	Bulgaria	1	(0)

Managerial career
- 2003–2004: Litex Lovech
- 2005–2006: Litex Lovech (assistant)
- 2006–2008: Sliven
- 2009: Spartak Varna
- 2009–2010: Sliven
- * Club domestic league appearances and goals

Dragoljub Simonović (Serbian Cyrillic: Драгољуб Симоновић, Bulgarian: Драголюб Симонович, romanized: Dragolyub Simonovich; born 30 October 1972) is a former footballer. Born in Yugoslavia, he represented Bulgaria internationally.

== Playing career ==
Simonović began his club career at the local Hajduk Kula, before transferring to Bulgarian Litex Lovech in 1997, where he won the 1998–99 Bulgarian Championship. In 2001, he transferred to CSKA Sofia.

He also played one match for the Bulgaria national team, against Algeria national team in 1998.

== Coaching career ==
He had been appointed on 16 January 2006 as a manager of OFC Sliven 2000. Simonović won the Bulgarian second division thus qualified the club in top division for 2008–09 season. In January 2009 he became manager of Spartak Varna.
