= Boyko Velichkov =

Bulgarian footballer and manager (born 1974)

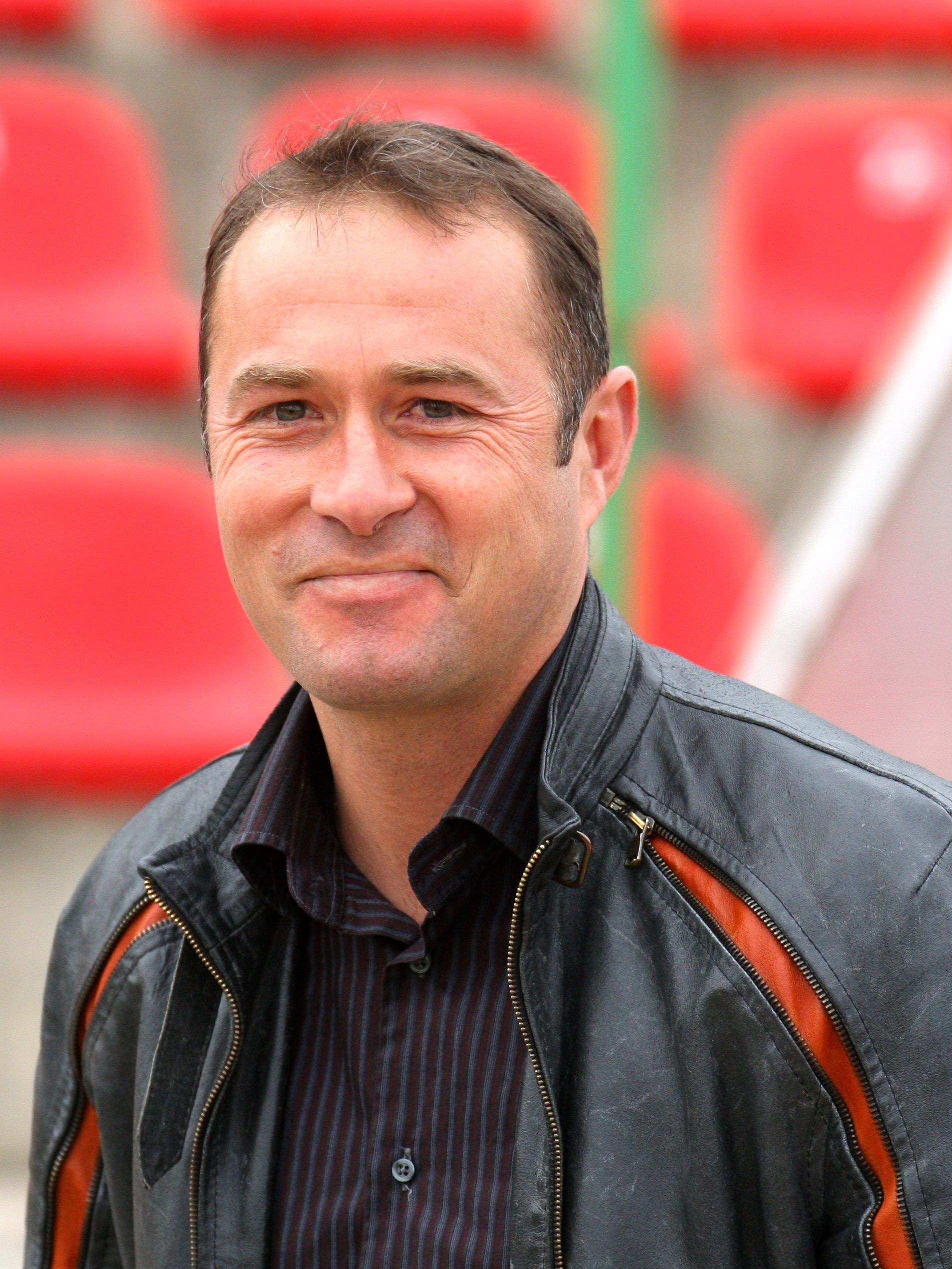

Personal information
- Full name: Boyko Petrov Velichkov
- Date of birth: 4 February 1974 (age 52)
- Place of birth: Sofia, Bulgaria
- Height: 1.80 m (5 ft 11 in)
- Positions: Attacking midfielder; forward

Team information
- Current team: CSKA Sofia (Academy Director)

Youth career
- 1984–1992: CSKA Sofia

Senior career*
Years	Team	Apps	(Gls)
1993–1995	Yantra Gabrovo		
1995	CSKA Sofia	17	(3)
1996	Litex Lovech	16	(3)
1996	Levski Sofia	6	(1)
1997–1998	Velbazhd Kyustendil	41	(13)
1998–1999	Spartak Varna	28	(10)
1999–2001	Velbazhd Kyustendil	51	(16)
2001–2003	Lokomotiv Sofia	61	(22)
2003–2005	Rot-Weiß Oberhausen	42	(7)
2005–2006	Ilisiakos		
2006–2007	Cherno More	5	(1)
2007–2008	Spartak Varna	15	(0)

Managerial career
- 2008–2010: Vihren Sandanski (assistant)
- 2010–2011: Chavdar Byala Slatina
- 2012: Lokomotiv Mezdra
- 2013–2014: Botev Vratsa
- 2016–2017: Botev Vratsa
- * Club domestic league appearances and goals

Boyko Velichkov (Bulgarian: Бойко Величков; born 4 February 1974) is a Bulgarian football manager and former player who played as an attacking midfielder.

== Club career ==
Velichkov began his playing career with CSKA Sofia. He later played for Yantra Gabrovo, Litex Lovech, Levski Sofia, Velbazhd Kyustendil, Spartak Varna, Lokomotiv Sofia, German 2. Bundesliga club Rot-Weiß Oberhausen, Greek side Ilisiakos and Cherno More Varna, before ending his career with Spartak Varna in 2008.

== Managerial career ==
Velichkov was employed as head coach of Botev Vratsa between December 2013 and June 2014.
