= Zoran Janković (footballer) =

Bulgarian footballer and manager

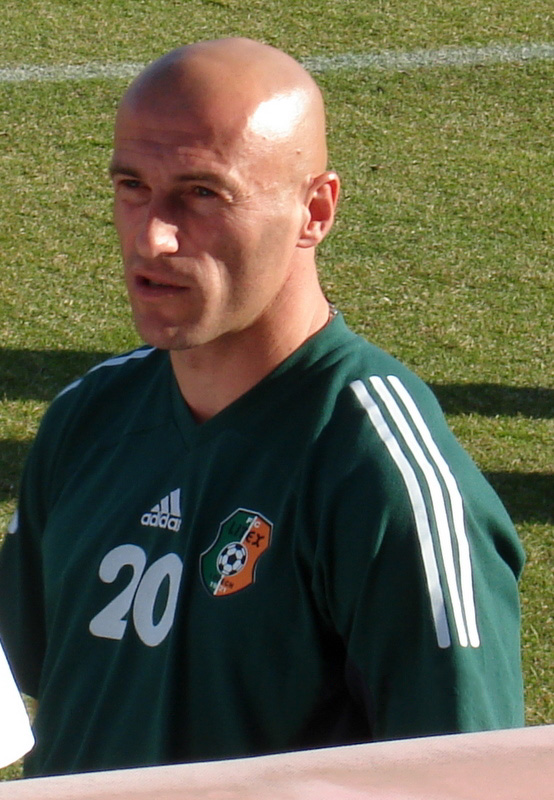

Personal information
- Date of birth: 8 February 1974 (age 52)
- Place of birth: Inđija, SR Serbia, SFR Yugoslavia
- Height: 1.80 m (5 ft 11 in)
- Position: Second striker

Team information
- Current team: Nanjing City (head coach)

Youth career
- Inđija

Senior career*
Years	Team	Apps	(Gls)
1994–1996	Borac Čačak		
1997–1998	Železnik	43	(22)
1998–2000	Vojvodina	44	(16)
2000–2002	Litex Lovech	42	(26)
2002–2007	Dalian Shide	113	(50)
2004	→ Litex Lovech (loan)	13	(2)
2007–2008	Litex Lovech	9	(1)
2008–2009	Ethnikos Achna	6	(1)
2009–2011	Inđija	34	(8)
Total		304	(126)

International career
2002–2007	Bulgaria	30	(2)

Managerial career
- 2011: Inđija
- 2012: Banat Zrenjanin
- 2013: Novi Sad
- 2015: Proleter Novi Sad
- 2016: Heilongjiang Lava Spring
- 2017–2018: Thailand (assistant)
- 2017–2018: Thailand U23
- 2019–2022: Beijing Guoan U21
- 2022: Shaoxing Shangyu Pterosaur
- 2023: Qingdao West Coast (interim)
- 2024: Shijiazhuang Gongfu
- 2025: Shanghai Jiading Huilong
- 2026: Changchun Xidu
- 2026–: Nanjing City
- * Club domestic league appearances and goals

Zoran Janković (Serbian Cyrillic: Зоран Јанковић, pronounced [zǒran jǎːŋkoʋitɕ]; Bulgarian: Зоран Янкович, romanized: Zoran Yankovich; born 8 February 1974) is a football manager and former player. Born in Yugoslavia, he represented Bulgaria as a player.

== Club career ==
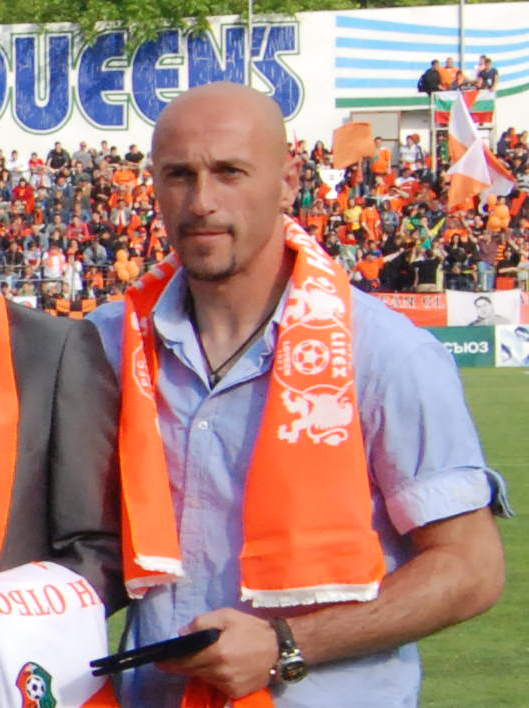
Janković with Litex Lovech

During his career, Janković represented FK Borac Čačak, FK Železnik, FK Vojvodina, PFC Litex Lovech, Dalian Shide F.C., Ethnikos Achna FC and FK Inđija. Janković was the highest scoring foreign player during the 2000–01 and 2001–02 A PFG seasons, managing 13 goals in each of them.

He has retired during winter break of 2010-11 season while playing for FK Inđija in the Serbian SuperLiga, becoming their manager.

On 15 September 2017, Janković became coach of the Thailand u-23 national team. He was sacked following Thailand's defeat in 2018 AFC U-23 Championship.

== International career ==
Janković was capped 30 times for the Bulgarian national team, scoring 2 goals. He made his debut for the national side on 13 February 2002, in a friendly match against Croatia, which ended in a scoreless draw. Janković was also a member of the Bulgarian squad at UEFA Euro 2004 in Portugal. He was initially dropped following Hristo Stoichkov's appointment as manager in July 2004, but was recalled in 2006 and made a number of appearances in the Euro 2008 qualifiers. Janković is the second most capped non-Bulgarian-born player to appear for the team (after fellow Serbian Predrag Pažin) and is the first out of two to score a goal (the other one who has found the net is Marcelinho).

== International goals ==
Scores and results list Bulgaria's goal tally first.

#	Date	Venue	Opponent	Score	Result	Competition
1	7 September 2002	King Baudouin Stadium, Brussels, Belgium	Belgium	1 – 0	2–0	Euro 2004 qualifier
2	12 February 2003	Ammochostos Stadium, Larnaca, Cyprus	Hungary	1 – 0	1–0	Friendly

== Honours ==
Litex Lovech

- Bulgarian Cup: 2000–01, 2003–04, 2007–08

Dalian Shide

- Chinese Super League: 2005
- Chinese FA Cup: 2005
