= Georgi Petrov (footballer, born 1974) =

Bulgarian footballer

Personal information
- Date of birth: 25 February 1974 (age 52)
- Place of birth: Gotse Delchev, Bulgaria
- Height: 1.78 m (5 ft 10 in)
- Position: Defender

Youth career
- 1984–1992: Pirin Gotse Delchev

Senior career*
Years	Team	Apps	(Gls)
1992–1994	Pirin Gotse Delchev	?	(?)
1994–1995	Pirin Blagoevgrad	5	(1)
1995–1996	Botev Plovdiv	24	(2)
1996–1997	Levski Sofia	2	(0)
1997–1999	Velbazhd	47	(1)
1999	Belasitsa Petrich	10	(0)
2000–2001	Velbazhd	43	(1)
2001–2003	Lokomotiv Plovdiv	43	(0)
2003	Liaoning Hongyun	22	(0)
2004	Lokomotiv Plovdiv	2	(0)
2004–2008	Belasitsa Petrich	76	(1)
	TOTAL	274	(6)

International career
2003–2004	Bulgaria	3	(0)
- * Club domestic league appearances and goals

Georgi Petrov (Bulgarian: Георги Петров) (born 25 February 1974) is a former Bulgarian footballer. His first club was PFC Pirin Gotse Delchev.

== Awards ==
- Champion of Bulgaria 2004 (with PFC Lokomotiv Plovdiv)
