= Luís Mota =

Portuguese association football player

Personal information
- Full name: Luís Fellipe Rodrigues Mota
- Date of birth: 25 September 2003 (age 23)
- Place of birth: Lisbon, Portugal
- Height: 1.80 m (5 ft 11 in)
- Position: Forward

Team information
- Current team: Lusitano de Évora
- Number: 19

Youth career
- 2012–2020: Belenenses SAD

Senior career*
| Years | Team | Apps | (Gls) |
| 2020–2021 | Belenenses SAD II | 11 | (3) |
| 2021–2022 | B-SAD | 10 | (1) |
| 2022–2025 | Porto B | 14 | (2) |
| 2025–2026 | Prishtina | 0 | (0) |
| 2026 | Żabbar St. Patrick | 12 | (0) |
| 2026– | Lusitano de Évora | 2 | (0) |
- * Club domestic league appearances and goals as of 12 September 2026

Luís Fellipe Rodrigues Mota (born 25 September 2003) is a Portuguese professional footballer who plays as a forward for Liga 3 club Lusitano de Évora.

== Club career ==
A youth product of Belenenses SAD, he signed his first professional contract with the club in the summer of 2020. He made his professional debut with B-SAD in a 1–0 Taça da Liga loss to Mafra on 24 July 2021.
