= Petar Kolev (footballer, born 1974) =

Bulgarian footballer and manager

Personal information
- Date of birth: 25 November 1974 (age 51)
- Place of birth: Haskovo, Bulgaria
- Height: 1.77 m (5 ft 10 in)
- Position: Defender

Team information
- Current team: Marek (manager)

Senior career*
Years	Team	Apps	(Gls)
1992–1993	Haskovo	17	(0)
1993–1997	Lokomotiv GO	98	(3)
1997–2001	Velbazhd Kyustendil	80	(7)
2001–2004	Lokomotiv Plovdiv	37	(6)
2003–2004	→ Rodopa Smolyan (loan)	9	(1)
2004–2009	Beroe Stara Zagora	89	(7)
Total		330	(24)

International career
1993–1994	Bulgaria U21		

Managerial career
- 2009–2010: Beroe B
- 2010–2011: Al-Qadisiya B
- 2011–2014: Chernomorets Burgas (assistant)
- 2014: Botev Plovdiv (scout)
- 2014: Levski Sofia (assistant)
- 2015–2017: Irtysh Pavlodar (assistant)
- 2017–2018: Ludugorets (assistant)
- 2018–2019: Irtysh Pavlodar (assistant)
- 2019–2021: Beroe (assistant)
- 2021–2022: Beroe
- 2022–2023: Sportist Svoge
- 2023–2024: Belasitsa Petrich
- 2024: Montana
- 2024–: Marek
- * Club domestic league appearances and goals

Petar Kolev (Bulgarian: Петър Колев; born 25 November 1974) is a Bulgarian football manager former defender. He began his managerial career in 2009. He has been head coach at Marek, Montana, Belasitsa, Sportist Svoge, and Beroe. As a player, Kolev won a Bulgarian Championship in 2004 with PFC Lokomotiv Plovdiv. He is a native of Haskovo.
