= Ivan Paskov =

Bulgarian footballer

Personal information
- Full name: Ivan Paskov
- Date of birth: 4 January 1973 (age 53)
- Place of birth: Sofia, Bulgaria
- Height: 1.82 m (6 ft 0 in)
- Positions: Defender; defensive midfielder

Youth career
- 1983–1992: Slavia Sofia

Senior career*
Years	Team	Apps	(Gls)
1992–1995	Slavia Sofia	37	(8)
1995–1996	Dunav Ruse	27	(4)
1996–1997	Akademik Sofia		
1998–1999	CSKA Sofia	20	(0)
1998–1999	→ Spartak Varna (loan)	24	(6)
2000	Spartak Varna	13	(3)
2000–2001	Velbazhd Kyustendil	21	(7)
2001–2005	Lokomotiv Plovdiv	95	(18)
2005	Kastoria	13	(0)
2006–2010	Lokomotiv Sofia	78	(10)
Total		328	(54)

International career
2005	Bulgaria	1	(0)
- * Club domestic league appearances and goals

Ivan Paskov (Bulgarian: Иван Пасков; born 4 January 1973) is a former Bulgarian footballer who last played for Lokomotiv Sofia. In 2010, he retired from football and became a scout. His international career lasted a total of only a minute or so. He came on right at the end of Bulgaria's match with Croatia on 9 October 2004. His nickname is Прасковата ("The Peach").

== Honours ==
Slavia Sofia

- Champion of Bulgaria: 1995–96

Lokomotiv Plovdiv

- Champion of Bulgaria: 2003–04
