= Zhivko Zhelev =

Bulgarian footballer and coach (born 1979)

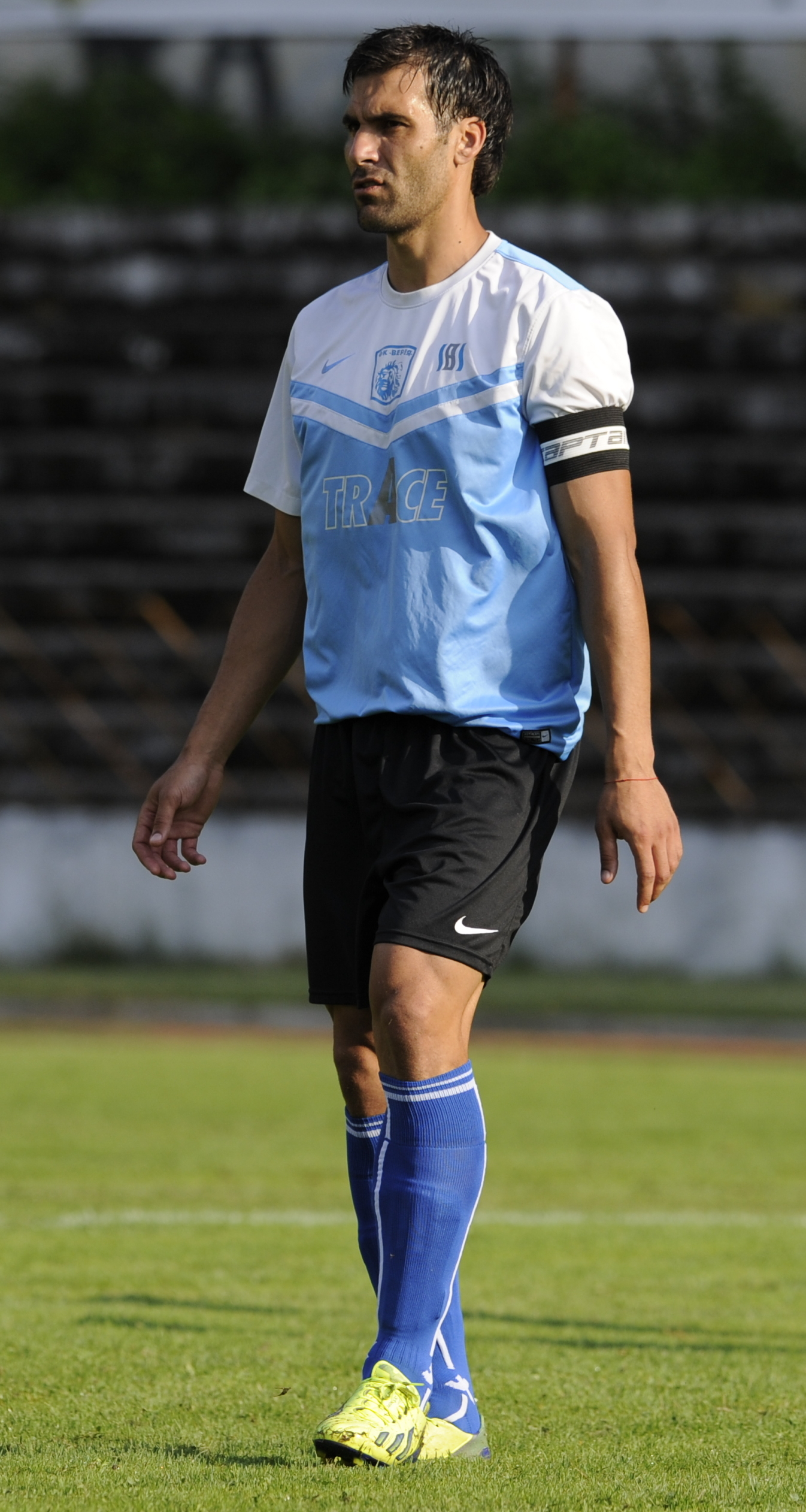
- Zhelev as a player in 2015

Personal information
- Full name: Zhivko Dinchev Zhelev
- Date of birth: 23 July 1979 (age 47)
- Place of birth: Stara Zagora, Bulgaria
- Height: 1.91 m (6 ft 3 in)
- Position: Centre back

Senior career*
Years	Team	Apps	(Gls)
1995–1996	Beroe Stara Zagora	3	(0)
1996–2007	Litex Lovech	196	(29)
1996–1998	→ Olimpik Teteven (loan)	37	(3)
2007–2009	Oțelul Galați	73	(7)
2010	Steaua București	16	(1)
2010	Inter Baku	1	(0)
2011	Simurq Zagatala	2	(0)
2011–2013	Slavia Sofia	66	(4)
2013–2016	Vereya Stara Zagora	64	(11)
Total		458	(55)

International career
- Bulgaria U-21
2001–2006	Bulgaria	6	(0)

Managerial career
- 2014–2015: Vereya (assistant)
- 2015–2016: Vereya (playing manager)
- 2016–2022: Litex Lovech
- 2022: CSKA Sofia II (assistant)
- 2022–2023: Yantra Gabrovo
- 2023: Bdin Vidin
- 2024: Lovech
- 2024–2025: Etar Veliko Tarnovo
- 2025-: Belasitsa Petrich
- * Club domestic league appearances and goals as of 11:48, 18 June 2016 (UTC)

Zhivko Dinchev Zhelev (Bulgarian: Живко Желев; born 23 July 1979 in Stara Zagora) is a retired Bulgarian football defender and now a manager.

== Club career ==
=== Litex ===
Zhelev joined Litex Lovech quite young but fought hard to get a place in the first team. He formed a formidable duet with ex-Bulgarian national defender Rosen Kirilov. However, due to a lack of strikers Zhelev was also used by managers to play as a striker for Litex and scored a lot of goals in this position. He is the defender who has scored the most goals in the whole history of Bulgarian football.

He has been considered one of the favourite players by Litex fans, due to his dedicated and selfless manner of playing, and his loyalty to the club. He has been awarded the title "The best player of Litex" in 2006.

=== Oţelul ===
On 12 July 2007, Zhelev joined Romanian club Oţelul Galaţi for a fee of €125,000

On 8 November 2009, after a game against FC Timişoara, he and his teammate Stoyan Kolev decided to leave Oţelul because of the financial situation of the club.

=== Steaua ===
"Coming to Steaua is a very important step in my career. I wanted to come to Steaua, because it is a very big club."

— Zhivko Zhelev after the first training at Steaua.

On 5 January 2010, Steaua and Oţelul agree Zhelev and Ochiroşii swap deal. On 10 January 2010, Steaua signed the Bulgarian centre-back on a free transfer until June 2011.

First match in Liga I for Steaua: 20 February 2010 • Steaua-Ceahlăul 1–3.

First goal in Liga I for Steaua: 25 April 2010 • Steaua-FC Timişoara 3–3.

In June 2010, Steaua has terminated the contract with Zhelev.

=== Inter Baku ===
On 25 June 2010, Zhelev signed a one-year deal with the Azerbaijani football club Inter Baku. Thus, he joins compatriot Petar Zlatinov in the club squad.

=== Slavia Sofia ===
At the end of the 2010–11 season, Zhelev returned to Bulgaria and joined Slavia Sofia on a free transfer. He made his comeback league debut at the start of the 2011–12 season in a 1–0 defeat to Levski Sofia on 8 August. Zhelev was frozen out of the first team in October 2013 (after Asen Bukarev had been replaced as coach) and in December 2013 joined Vereya Stara Zagora in the third division of Bulgarian football.

=== Vereya Stara Zagora ===
In March 2015, Zhelev took over from Radostin Kishishev as head coach of Vereya Stara Zagora. However, his assistant Vladislav Yanush was officially registered as the manager, as Zhelev had not yet obtained the coaching license to manage in the B PFG.

=== Litex Lovech ===
In July 2016, Zhelev became the manager of Litex Lovech and coached them in the third tier of Bulgarian football.

=== Belasitsa ===
In September 2025, he took over as manager of relegation-threatened Second League club Belasitsa Petrich.

== Honours ==
=== Player ===
Litex Lovech

- Bulgarian A Group: 1998–99
- Bulgarian Cup (2): 2001, 2004

=== Head coach ===
Litex Lovech

- Third League: 2016–17
