= FC Lovech =

Bulgarian football club

- Full name: Football Club Litex Lovech
- Nickname: Оранжевите (The Oranges)
- Founded: 1921; 105 years ago (as Hisarya Sports Club)
- Dissolved: 2026
- Ground: Gradski Stadion, Lovech, Bulgaria
- Capacity: 8,000
- Manager: Ferario Spasov
- League: Northwest Third League
- 2024–25: Second League, 17th (relegated)
- Website: fclovech.com
Home colours	Away colours

FC Lovech (Bulgarian: ФК Ловеч; formerly Litex Lovech) was a Bulgarian professional football club based in Lovech. The club was founded in 1921 as Hisarya Sports Club.

The club's home ground was the Gradski Stadion, which has a capacity of 8,100 seats, electric floodlights and permission to stage European matches. As one of the successful Bulgarian clubs outside the capital Sofia, Lovech won the domestic championship four times and the Bulgarian Cup on four occasions. Together with CSKA Sofia and Levski Sofia, Lovech was also one of the football clubs to represent the country regularly in the European Club Association.

== History ==
=== 1921–1996 ===
The club was founded in 1921 as Hisarya and began playing league football two years later, in 1923. Over the years, the club changed its name several times. From 1957 it was named Karpachev, before becoming Osam in 1979. Under that name the club played constantly in the B Group, the second division of Bulgarian football and was near to promotion several times. A notable player during this period was Plamen Linkov, who broke the club's appearance record, playing 575 matches and scoring 167 goals respectively.

In 1990, after Bulgaria's transition to market economy, privately owned company LEX became the main sponsor of the club. During the same year, the new owners changed the name of the football club to LEX. The 1993–94 B Group proved to be impressive for the club, as the team finished first in the second division and qualified for the A Group, a notable milestone never done before in the club's history. LEX's debut season in the A Group was also noteworthy, as the team ranked 11th at the end of the season. The next season however proved to be unsuccessful and the club, renamed Lovech, was relegated to the B Group.

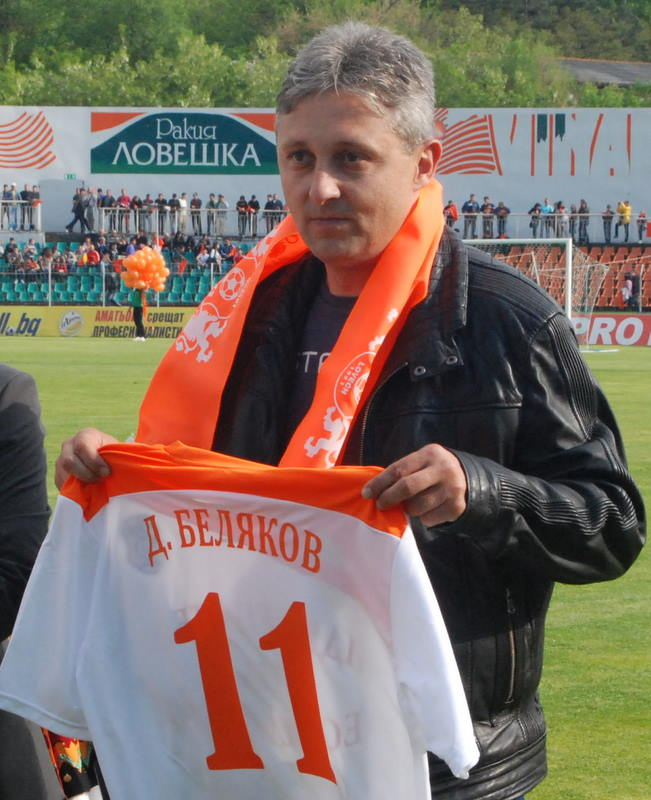
Litex's former top goalscorer Dimcho Belyakov.

=== Grisha Ganchev ownership (1996–2016) ===
Crest used from 2007 until 2024.

In June 1996, the club was purchased by Grisha Ganchev, petrol businessman and a citizen of Lovech, and it was renamed to Litex. The takeover was immediately followed by a flurry of bids for high-profile players. Ferario Spasov was named as the new Litex coach. He led the club back to the A Group at their first attempt. During the 1996–97 season Litex also reached the quarter-finals of the Bulgarian Cup and the final of the Bulgarian League Cup, which was lost after a penalty shoot-out.

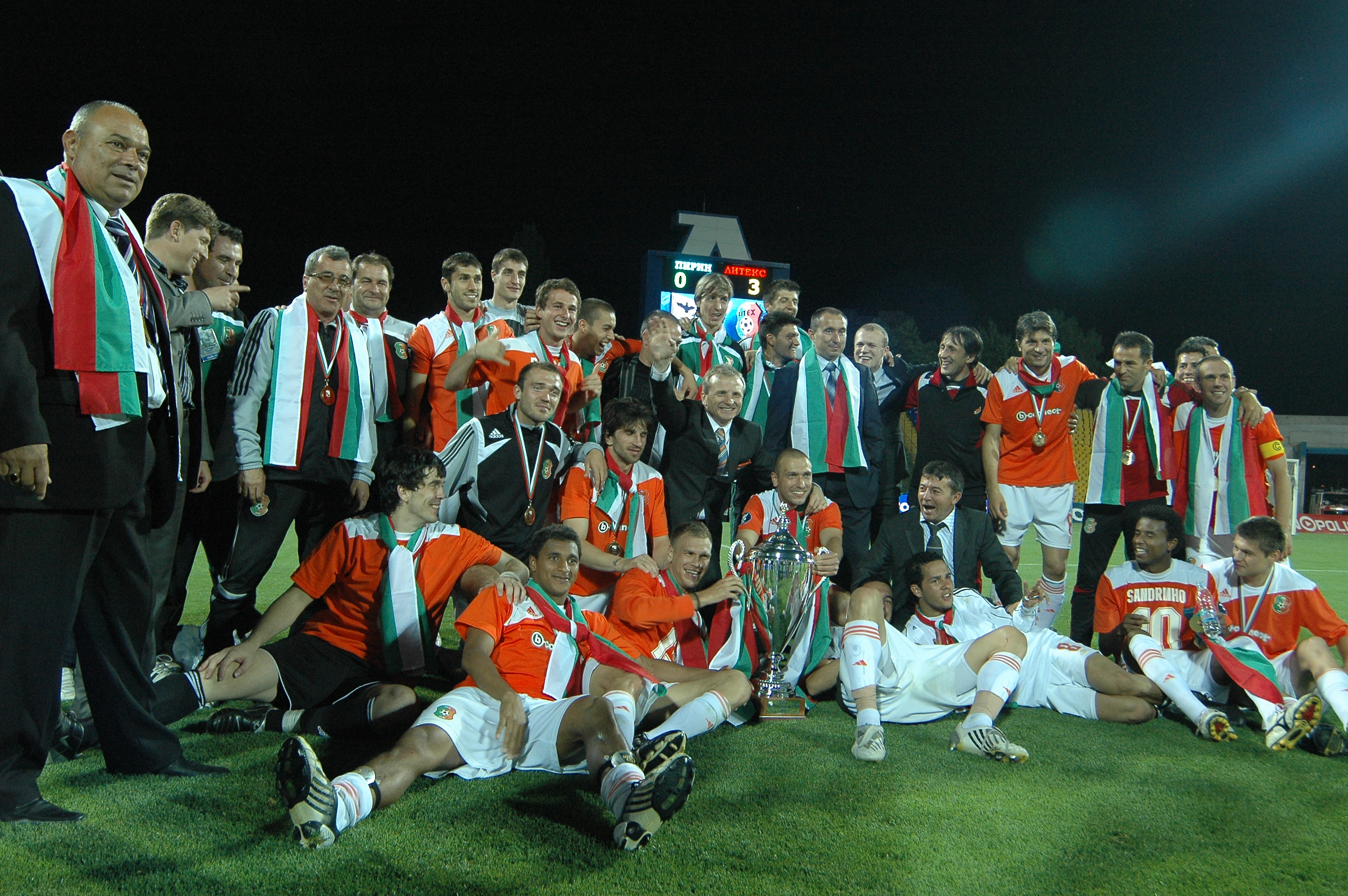
Litex players with the Bulgarian Cup in 2009.

In 1997, Litex was promoted for the second time to the top division and immediately became Bulgarian champions, finishing the season 5 points ahead of the second-placed Levski Sofia, unprecedented in the Bulgarian football history. The striker of the team Dimcho Belyakov also became top goalscorer with his 21 goals contributed during the season. In addition, midfielder Stoycho Stoilov received the Best Player of the League award. In the club's first appearance in European club competition, Litex eliminated Swedish club Halmstads BK 4–3 on aggregate, reaching the second qualifying round, where it was knocked out by Spartak Moscow.

A year later Litex successfully defended their league title, losing only two league games during the course of the season. They became the first provincial club to win back-to-back league titles since the 1920s. During their campaign, Litex also inflicted the biggest defeat in CSKA Sofia's history, an 8–0 thrashing at the Lovech Stadium.

During the first decade of the 21st century, Litex won the Bulgarian Cup four times—in 2001 after defeating Velbazhd Kyustendil 1–0 in extra time, in 2004 against CSKA after a penalty shoot-out, in 2008 after a 1–0 win over Cherno More Varna, and in 2009, after a 3–0 thrashing over Pirin Blagoevgrad. In early August 2007, Litex signed a three-year sponsorship and advertising contract with Bulgarian mobile operator GLOBUL and started the 2007–08 season with the logo of the mobile service i-mode on the team's kits. In December 2007, Litex became the first Bulgarian club to have a branded mobile phone game, Litex Football. Before the start of the 2008–09 season, Litex lost the Bulgarian Supercup final with 0-1 from CSKA Sofia after a goal from Kiril Kotev in the 65th minute. A season later, Litex again failed to win the Bulgarian Supercup final, this time against domestic title holders Levski Sofia.

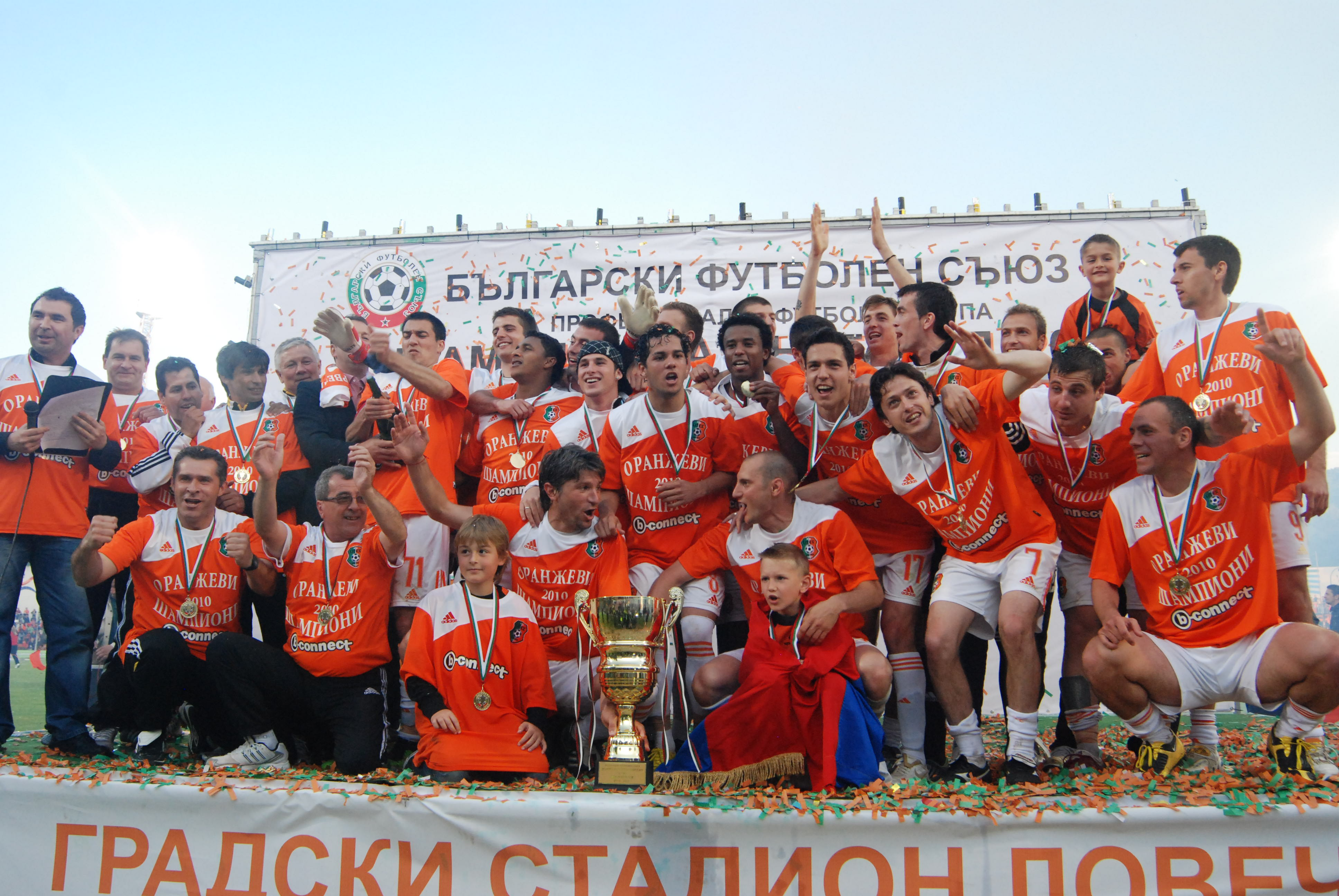
Litex with the A PFG title in 2010

In 2009–10, Litex became champions of Bulgaria for the third time in their history, finishing the season with 12 points advantage over the runners-up CSKA Sofia. On 12 August 2010, Litex defeated Beroe 2–1 to finally secure the Bulgarian Supercup, the last remaining domestic trophy never won before by the club. In 2010–11 Litex retained their fourth league title, securing the championship after a 3–1 away win against Lokomotiv Sofia on 21 May 2011.

=== Expulsion and Daniel Ganchev era (2015–2024) ===
In the summer of 2015, Grisha Ganchev stepped down from his position as an owner, only to reallocate his main investments to Bulgarian football club CSKA Sofia, which was struggling financially with unpaid debts during the time. As a result, his son Danail took over at Litex, with previous shareholder, Bulgarian joint stock company Sport 96, remaining as a subsidiary of Litex Commerce JSC.

On 16 December 2015, the Bulgarian Football Union expelled Litex Lovech from the A Group. The decision was taken in response to an incident that occurred during Litex Lovech's 12 December tie with Levski Sofia, when chairman Stoycho Stoilov controversially pulled the squad off the field in protest after two players were sent off with Lovech leading 1–0. On 20 January 2016, the team was administratively relegated to the B Group for the following 2016–17 season. Litex's players however were allowed to complete their participation in the Bulgarian Cup and finish the 2015–16 season with the club's reserve squad, Litex Lovech II, playing in the B Group.

On 27 May 2016, the company that represented PFC Chavdar Etropole, PFC Chavdar EAD, was renamed PFC CSKA-1948 AD. On 6 June 2016, the representative of PFC Litex Lovech, PFC Litex-Lovech AD, was renamed PFC CSKA-Sofia EAD, with PFC CSKA-1948 AD being written in as its owner. That company later successfully applied to take part in the reformed First League, as PFC CSKA Sofia. The shift was made because the former company that represented PFC CSKA Sofia, PFC CSKA AD, did not gain a professional license, and later went bankrupt, ceasing operations as of 9 September 2016. PFC Litex Lovech was demoted to the Third League, taking the place of FC Botev Lukovit.

On 4 July 2016, former Litex player Zhivko Zhelev was appointed as a manager of a team that consisted mainly of academy players. Litex managed to win its first match of the new season. The squad also played in the 2016–17 Bulgarian Cup, eliminating First League outfits Slavia Sofia and Cherno More on their way to the semifinals, where Litex lost to reigning five-time champions Ludogorets Razgrad on an aggregate score of 0–11. Litex also was promoted to the Second League, after winning the North-West Group of the Third League.

=== Return to Lovech Municipality (2024–present) ===
On 17 May 2024, Litex Commerce JSC announced that they will return the ownership of the club to the Lovech Municipality and the team would drop the company name. On 30 May 2024, the deal was finalised and the club became owned by Lovech Municipality. Zhivko Zhelev was announced as the new manager of the club on 17 June 2024. On 18 July the team announced that the new name would be FC Lovech, despite the chance to return to the old name Osam Lovech. At the end of the 2024–25 season in the Second League, Lovech was relegated to the Third League. On 5 March 2026 Lovech submitted an application to forfeit playing in the Third League. This resulted to Lovech losing their professional license and the dissolving of the club.

=== Recent league statistics ===
Season	League	Place	W	D	L	GF	GA	Pts	Bulgarian Cup
2007–08	A Group	4	16	9	5	51	26	56	Winner
2008–09	A Group	4	17	7	6	53	26	58	Winner
2009–10	A Group	1	22	4	4	59	17	70	Third round
2010–11	A Group	1	23	6	1	56	13	75	Semifinals
2011–12	A Group	5	17	8	5	57	28	59	Semifinals
2012–13	A Group	5	15	5	10	56	24	50	Quarterfinals
2013–14	A Group	3	21	9	8	74	37	72	Quarterfinals
2014–15	A Group	4	16	6	10	49	36	54	Quarterfinals
2015–16	A Group	10	0 (8)	0 (9)	0 (3)	0 (29)	0 (19)	0 (33)	Semifinals
2016–17	Third League (III)	1	25	2	1	114	9	77	Semifinals
2017–18	Second League (II)	10	10	9	11	26	26	39	Quarterfinals
2018–19	Second League (II)	5	12	9	9	43	26	45	Round of 32
Green marks a season followed by promotion, red a season followed by relegation.

== Stadium ==
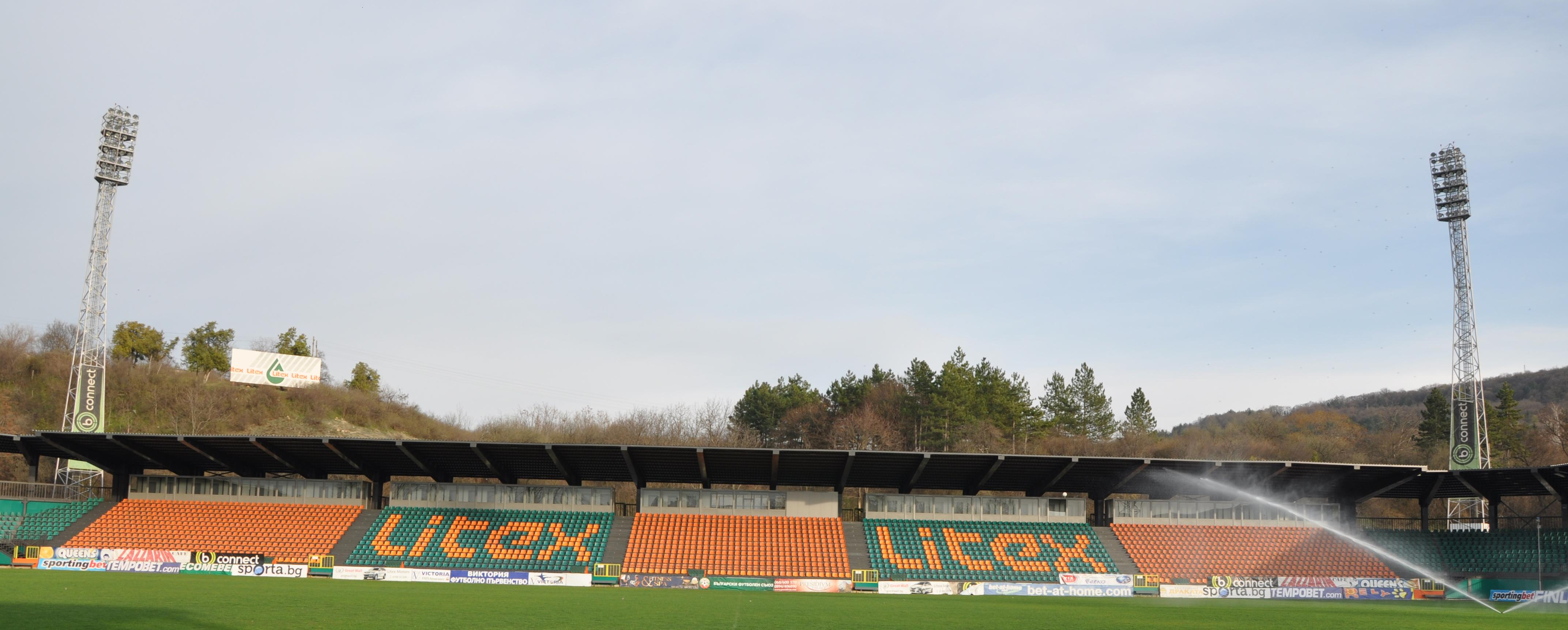
Lovech Stadium

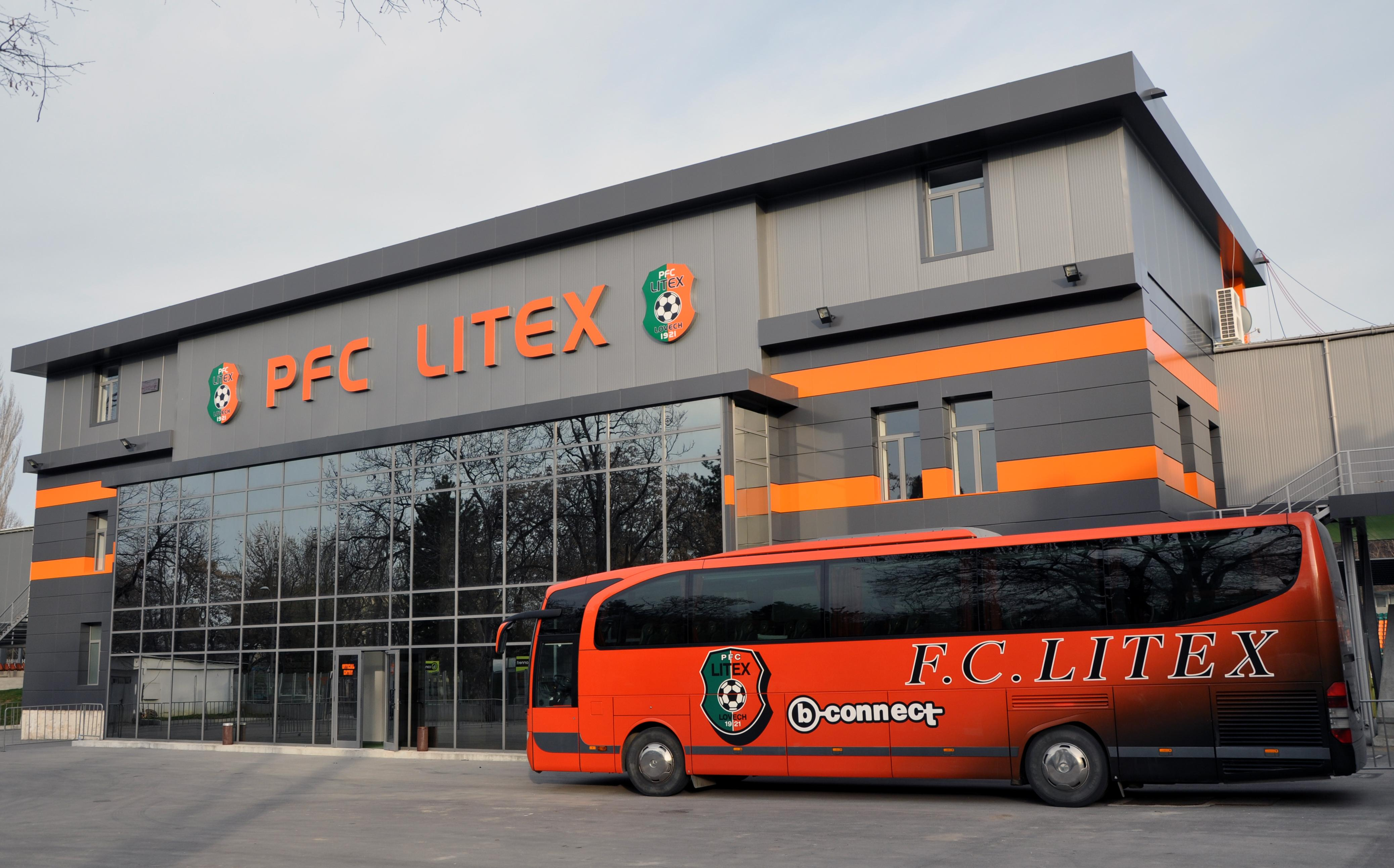
Lovech Stadium

FC Lovech's (or then Litex Lovech) home ground is the Lovech Stadium, a football stadium in Lovech. Built in 1962, the ground underwent a total reconstruction in 1999 and was brought to a suitable standard to host international matches later that year. The stadium has a capacity of 8,000 seating places with pitch dimensions of 105 to 68 meters. The venue's record attendance of 12,500 was achieved during a domestic league match against Levski Sofia on 19 April 1998. The record attendance in the European club competitions was achieved against English club Aston Villa on 18 September 2008, when around 8,000 spectators supported the team.

In the summer of 2010, a massive reconstruction of the venue started. New side stands with roof covers were built and the media sectors were expanded in order to meet the UEFA guidelines for Champions League matches. On 12 July 2010, the stadium was awarded with a Category 3 ranking by UEFA. The reconstructions continued in the summer of 2011, when the main stand of the stadium was completed.

== Honours ==
=== Domestic ===
- First League:
  - Winners (4): 1997–98, 1998–99, 2009–10, 2010–11
- Bulgarian Cup:
  - Winners (4): 2000–01, 2003–04, 2007–08, 2008–09
- Bulgarian Supercup:
  - Winners (1): 2010
- Second League:
  - Winners (2): 1993–94, 1996–97
- Third League:
  - Winners (2): 1973–74, 2016–17

== European record ==
Competition	S	P	W	D	L	GF	GA	GD
UEFA Champions League	4	16	8	1	7	29	28	+ 1
UEFA Europa League	13	56	23	12	21	76	60	+ 16
Total	17	72	31	13	28	105	88	+ 17

== Players ==
=== Current squad ===
As of 1 January 1999

Note: Flags indicate national team as defined under FIFA eligibility rules; some limited exceptions apply. Players may hold more than one non-FIFA nationality.

No.	Pos.	Nation	Player
1	GK	BUL	Vitomir Vutov
2	DF	ROU	Laurentiu Reghekampf
3	DF	BUL	Rosen Kirilov
4	DF	BUL	Stefan Kolev
5	DF	BUL	Dimitar Balabanov
6	MF	BUL	Rosen Emilov
7	MF	BUL	Mariyan Todorov
8	MF	BUL	Stoicho Stoilov
9	FW	BUL	Stefan Yurukov
10	MF	BUL	Ivaylo Petev
11	FW	BUL	Dimcho Belyakov
12	GK	BUL	Stoyan Stavrev
13	DF	BUL	Nikolay Dimitrov

No.	Pos.	Nation	Player
14	FW	ALB	Alban Bushi
15	MF	SRB	Dragoljub Simonovic
17	DF	SRB	Zlatomir Zagorcic
18	FW	SRB	Igor Bogdanovic
19	DF	BUL	Veselin Sarbakov
20	FW	BUL	Svetoslav Todorov
21	DF	BUL	Veselin Ignatov
22	DF	BUL	Ivaylo Petkov
24	FW	BRA	Luis Mota
25	MF	BUL	Radostin Kishishev
26	DF	BUL	Dimitar Karadaliev
27	FW	BUL	Daniel Ostrovski
28	MF	BUL	Vasil Kirov

For recent transfers, see Transfers winter 2024–25 and Transfers summer 2025.

== Notable players ==
Had international caps for their respective countries, or held any club record. Players whose name is listed in bold represented their countries.

Bulgaria

- (Bulgaria) **Aleksandar Tsvetkov**
- (Bulgaria) **Angel Lyaskov**
- (Bulgaria) Atanas Bornosuzov
- (Bulgaria) **Dimcho Belyakov**
- (Bulgaria) Dimitar Karadaliev
- (Bulgaria) **Georgi Denev**
- (Bulgaria) **Georgi Milanov**
- (Bulgaria) **Hristiyan Petrov**
- (Bulgaria) **Hristo Yanev**
- (Bulgaria) **Hristo Yovov**
- (Bulgaria) **Ivan Turitsov**
- (Bulgaria) **Ivaylo Petkov**
- (Bulgaria) **Ivelin Popov**
- (Bulgaria) **Kiril Despodov**
- (Bulgaria) **Kristiyan Malinov**
- (Bulgaria) **Mihail Venkov**
- (Bulgaria) **Momchil Tsvetanov**
- (Bulgaria) Nikolay Dimitrov
- (Bulgaria) **Petar Hubchev**
- (Bulgaria) **Petar Zanev**
- (Bulgaria) **Plamen Galabov**
- (Bulgaria) **Plamen Linkov**
- (Bulgaria) **Plamen Nikolov**
- (Bulgaria) **Radostin Kishishev**
- (Bulgaria) **Rosen Kirilov**
- (Bulgaria) **Simeon Slavchev**
- (Bulgaria) **Stanislav Manolev**
- (Bulgaria) Stefan Kolev
- (Bulgaria) **Stefan Yurukov**
- (Bulgaria) Stoyan Stavrev
- (Bulgaria) **Stoycho Stoilov**
- (Bulgaria) **Strahil Popov**
- (Bulgaria) **Svetoslav Todorov**
- (Brazil) (Bulgaria) **Tiago Silva**
- (Bulgaria) **Tsvetomir Panov**
- (Bulgaria) **Vasil Bozhikov**
- (Bulgaria) **Vitomir Vutov**
- (Bulgaria) **Zdravko Zdravkov**
- (Bulgaria) **Zhivko Zhelev**
- (Serbia) (Bulgaria) **Zlatomir Zagorčić**
- (Serbia) (Bulgaria) **Zoran Janković**

Europe

- (Albania) **Alban Bushi**
- (Albania) **Altin Haxhi**
- (Albania) **Armando Vajushi**
- (Albania) **Jurgen Gjasula**
- (Bosnia and Herzegovina) **Džemal Berberović**
- (France) Alexandre Barthe
- (France) Jean-Philippe Caillet
- (France) Wilfried Niflore
- (North Macedonia) **Robert Popov**
- (Norway) **Bjørn Maars Johnsen**
- (Romania) **Bogdan Pătraşcu**
- (Romania) **Eugen Trică**
- (Romania) **Florin Prunea**
- (Romania) **Laurențiu Reghecampf**
- (Serbia) **Igor Bogdanović**
- (Serbia) Nebojša Jelenković
- (Slovenia) **Milivoje Novakovič**

South America

- (Brazil) Sandrinho
- (Brazil) Doka Madureira
- (Brazil) Tom
- (Colombia) Danilo Moreno Asprilla
- (Colombia) Wilmar Jordán
- (Venezuela) **Alejandro Cichero**

Africa

- (Morocco) **Mourad Hdiouad**

== Managerial history ==
This is a list of the recent Litex Lovech managers:

Name	From	To	Honours
(Bulgaria) Stoycho Mladenov	June 2004	Nov 2004	
(Israel) Itzhak Shum	15 November 2004	May 2005	
(Serbia) Ljupko Petrović	1 July 2005	12 June 2007	1 Bulgarian Cup
(Bulgaria) Ferario Spasov	June 2007	Nov 2007	
(Serbia) Miodrag Ješić	Nov 2007	May 2008	1 Bulgarian Cup
(Bulgaria) Stanimir Stoilov	1 June 2008	28 August 2009	1 Bulgarian Cup
(Bulgaria) Angel Chervenkov	1 September 2009	5 August 2010	1 Bulgarian A PFG
(Bulgaria) Petko Petkov (interim)	5 August 2010	1 September 2010	1 Bulgarian Supercup
(Bulgaria) Lyuboslav Penev	2 September 2010	24 October 2011	1 Bulgarian A PFG
(Bulgaria) Atanas Dzhambazki	24 October 2011	31 December 2011	
(Bulgaria) Hristo Stoichkov	5 January 2012	5 June 2013	
(Bulgaria) (Serbia) Zlatomir Zagorčić	1 July 2013	31 March 2014	
(Serbia) Miodrag Ješić	31 March 2014	25 May 2014	
(Bulgaria) Krasimir Balakov	26 May 2014	10 July 2015	
(Serbia) Ljupko Petrović (interim)	10 July 2015	5 August 2015	
(Romania) Laurențiu Reghecampf	6 August 2015	3 December 2015	
(Serbia) Ljupko Petrović	3 December 2015	3 January 2016	
(Bulgaria) Lyuboslav Penev	22 January 2016	2 June 2016	
(Bulgaria) Zhivko Zhelev	4 July 2016	22 June 2022	
(Bulgaria) Andrey Andreev	22 June 2022	16 March 2023	
(Serbia) Ljupko Petrović	16 March 2023	26 June 2023	
(Bulgaria) Dobromir Mitov	27 June 2023	16 October 2023	
(Serbia) Alen Tupajić	16 October 2023	13 June 2024	
(Bulgaria) Zhivko Zhelev	16 June 2024	2 September 2024	
(Bulgaria) Veselin Simeonov	2 September 2024	17 September 2024	
(Bulgaria) Hristo Arangelov	17 September 2024	18 February 2025	
(Romania) Eugen Trică	19 February 2025	22 May 2025	
(Bulgaria) Evgeni Sistov	22 May 2025		

== Notable stats ==
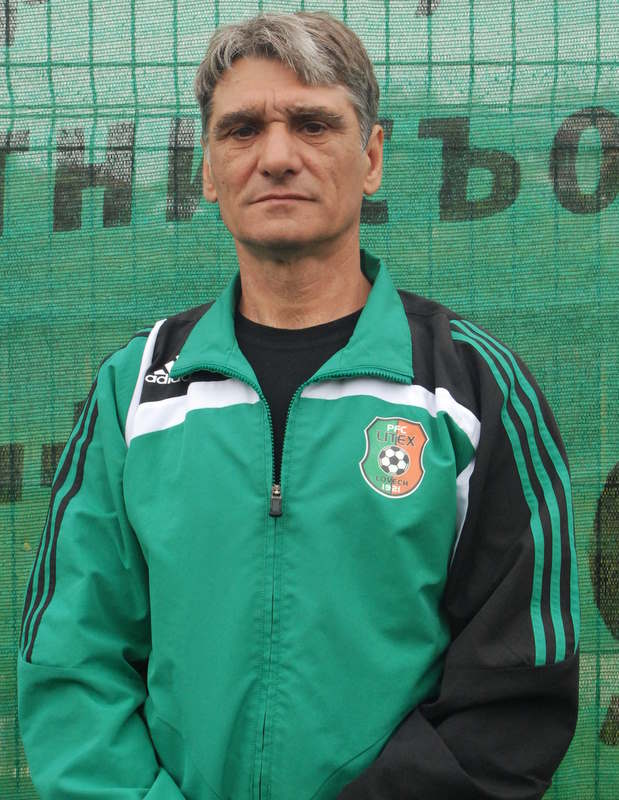
Plamen Linkov, the club's top scorer

Most appearances for the club

Rank	Name	Apps
1	(Bulgaria) Plamen Linkov	575
2	(Bulgaria) Ferario Spasov	350
3	(Serbia) Nebojša Jelenković	307
4	(Bulgaria) Plamen Nikolov	268
5	(Bulgaria) Vitomir Vutov	245

Most goals for the club

Rank	Name	Goals
1	(Bulgaria) Plamen Linkov	167
2	(Bulgaria) Stefan Yurukov	84
3	(Bulgaria) Svetoslav Todorov	70
4	(Bulgaria) Hristo Yovov	54
5	(Bulgaria) Dimcho Belyakov	48

First professional league top scorer with the club

Year	Name	Goals
1999	(Bulgaria) Dimcho Belyakov	21
2000	(Bulgaria) Svetoslav Todorov	19
2006	(Slovenia) Milivoje Novakovič	16
2010	(France) Wilfried Niflore	19
2014	(Colombia) Wilmar Jordán	20

Notes: Last update 13 April 2023

=== All-time top scorers in A PFG ===
- Updated 13 December 2014

Rank	Name	Goals scores	Games played	Assists	Goals per game	Years played
1	(Bulgaria) Svetoslav Todorov	56	127	22	0.44	1997–01, 2009–12
2	(Bulgaria) Stefan Yurukov	55	113	11	0.49	1996–97, 1998–02, 2003–04
3	(Bulgaria) Hristo Yovov	45	97	20	0.46	2000–04
4	(France) Wilfried Niflore	39	72	11	0.54	2008–11
5	(Bulgaria) Dimcho Beliakov	35	67	11	0.52	1994–97, 1998–99, 2004
6	(Bulgaria) Zhivko Zhelev	31	196	7	0.16	1996–07
7	(Colombia) Wilmar Jordán	29	54	7	0.54	2013–15
8	(Bulgaria) Zoran Janković	29	64	17	0.45	2000–02, 2004, 2007–08
9	(Bulgaria) Georgi Milanov	28	106	20	0.26	2009–13
10	(Bulgaria) Krum Bibishkov	27	60	6	0.45	2007–09
