= Vitomir Vutov =

Bulgarian footballer and coach

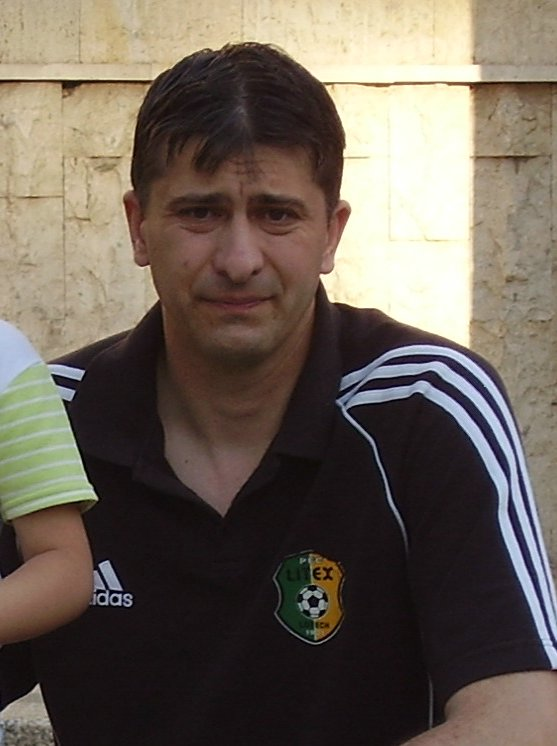

Personal information
- Full name: Vitomir Hristov Vutov
- Date of birth: 22 November 1971 (age 54)
- Place of birth: Sofia, Bulgaria
- Height: 2.00 m (6 ft 6 1/2 in)
- Position: Goalkeeper

Youth career
- 1982–1990: Litex Lovech

Senior career*
Years	Team	Apps	(Gls)
1991–2007	Litex Lovech	236	(0)
1991–1994	→ Loko Mezdra (loan)	45	(0)
Total		281	(0)

Managerial career
- 2006–2009: Litex Lovech (goalkeepers coach)
- 2008–2013: Bulgaria U17 (goalkeepers coach)
- 2013–2016: Bulgaria U19 (goalkeepers coach)
- 2016–2017: Litex Lovech
- 2018–2019: Al Qadsiah (goalkeepers coach)
- 2020–2021: Lokomotiv GO (goalkeepers coach)
- 2021–2022: Lokomotiv Plovdiv (goalkeepers coach)
- 2022: Bulgaria (goalkeepers coach)
- 2024: Spartak Varna (goalkeepers coach)
- 2024–2025: Lovech (goalkeepers coach)
- 2025–2026: Simba (goalkeepers coach)
- * Club domestic league appearances and goals

Vitomir Vutov (Bulgarian: Витомир Вутов; born 22 November 1971) is a former Bulgarian football goalkeeper and currently goalkeepers coach of Lovech.

== Career ==
During his career, Vutov played solely for Lokomotiv Mezdra and Litex Lovech. A product of the Litex's famed youth system, he was loaned to Loko Mezdra in 1991. Some three years later Vutov returned to Litex Lovech, his last professional club. With Litex he won the Bulgarian league title in 1998 and 1999, and the Bulgarian Cup for 2001 and 2004. For the club he played 8 games in the qualifying rounds of Champions League, 35 games in UEFA Cup, 40games in Bulgarian Cup, 246 games in A PFG and 60in B PFG.

== Goalkeeping coach ==
2007 fc Litex\Lovech\In 2008-2017 Pfc Litex 20018-2019 Al Qadsiach /Saudy Arabiq/2021 Vutov moved from Lokomotiv GO to Lokomotiv Plovdiv. On 17 February 2022 it was announced that he would take the position as the new goalkeeping coach of Bulgaria national team, previously vacated by Georgi Sheytanov, and also retaining his position in Lokomotiv Plovdiv. fc Simba/Tanzaniq/

== Honours ==
- Best goalkeeper in the A PFG for the 1997-98 season
- Ikar award for sporting longevity
- Sportsman #1 of the city of Lovech

== Statistics ==
- Up to the 2006 – 2007 season

Season	Team	League	Domestic League *1		UEFA cup		Total	
Season	Team	League	Appearance	Goals	Appearance	Goals	A.	G.
1994–95	Litex	A grupa	17	0	0	0	17	0
1995–96	Litex	A grupa	26	0	0	0	26	0
1996–97	Litex	B grupa	28	0	0	0	28	0
1997–98	Litex	A grupa	28	0	0	0	28	0
1998–99	Litex	A grupa	19	0	4	0	23	0
1999-00	Litex	A grupa	16	0	4	0	20	0
2000–01	Litex	A grupa	10	0	?	0	10	0
2001–02	Litex	A grupa	34	0	?	0	34	0
2002–03	Litex	A grupa	2	0	?	0	2	0
2003–04	Litex	A grupa	6	0	?	0	6	0
2004–05	Litex	A grupa	21	0	?	0	21	0
2005–06	Litex	A grupa	26	0	?	0	26	0
2006–07	Litex	A grupa	7	0	4	0	11	0
