= Velbazhd Kyustendil =

Bulgarian football club

- Full name: Футболен клуб „Велбъжд“ Кюстендил (English: Velbazhd Kyustendil Football Club)
- Founded: 1919; 107 years ago
- Ground: Osogovo Stadium
- Capacity: 13,000
- Chairman: Iliyan Hadzhiyski
- Manager: Ivan Marinov - Maslara
- League: A RFG Kyustendil
- 2023–24: A RFG Kyustendil (Osogovo subgroup), 1st
Home colours	Away colours

Velbazhd Kyustendil (Bulgarian: Велбъжд Кюстендил) is a Bulgarian professional association football club based in Kyustendil. The club currently competes in the A RFG Kyustendil, the fourth tier of Bulgarian football.

The club was founded in 1919. Velbazhd have spent most of their playing history between the second and third tiers of the Bulgarian football league system. The club first won promotion to the A Group in 1954, and have played a total of 7 seasons in the top flight, with the longest continuous spell being six seasons (1995–2001). This is generally seen as the club's most successful period. Velbazhd finished third in A Group in 1999, 2000 and 2001, competed in the Intertoto Cup in the 2000–01 season, and reached the Bulgarian Cup final in 2001.

== History ==
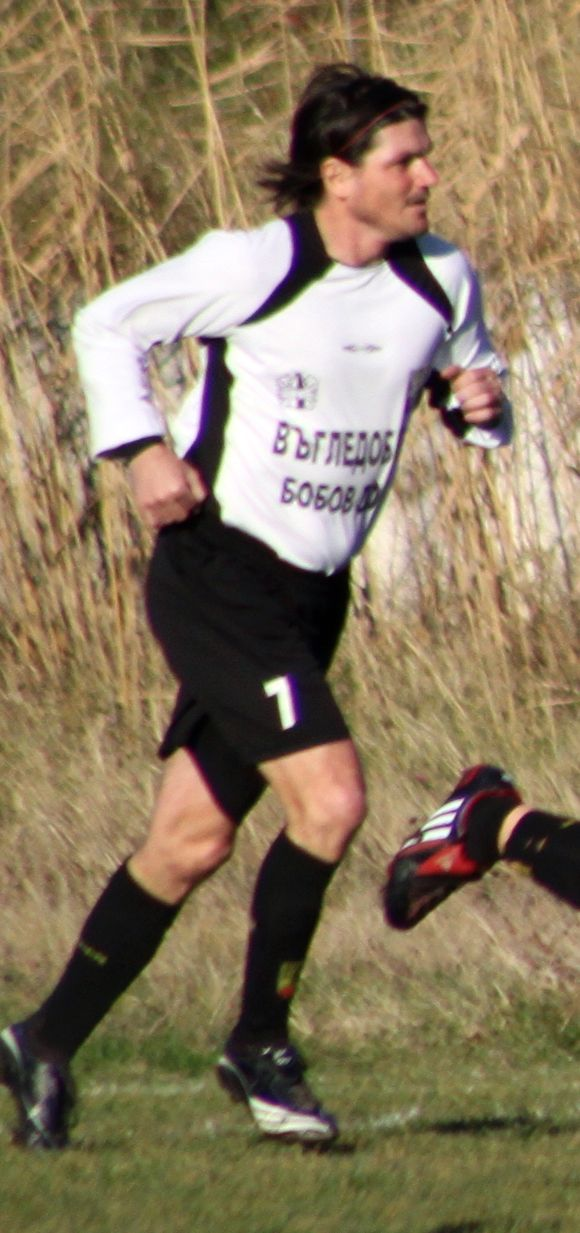
Plamen Petrov is the all-time record appearance holder at the club in the A Group

Velbazhd was formed in 1919, though the club changed its name in the following year to Sport Club Motsion. In 1928 they changed their name to Sport Club Borislav. From 1940 to 1945 the club is called Pautalia. After World War II they changed their name to Cherveno zname. In 1956 the club was renamed to Levski. In 1970 the club returned to its original name Velbazhd, but from 1995 to 1999 again called Levski, under the ownership of Georgi Iliev.

In 1953 they were promoted to Bulgarian football's top division for the first time in their history. The 1954 season saw Velbazhd make their first appearance in the top flight of Bulgarian football. This first season was less successful and they were relegated back to the B PFG, finishing in 12th place.

In 1994–95 season, Velbazhd won their second promotion to A PFG, this returning to the top flight after a 41-year absence. During the 1998–99 season they finished 3rd, their highest ever league finish. In the following season, Velbazhd also finished 3rd. The club's forward Mihail Mihaylov became A PFG top scorer with 20 goals.

In 2001, Velbazhd reached the Bulgarian Cup Final for the first time, beating Marek Dupnitsa, Metalurg Pernik, Spartak Pleven and Lokomotiv Sofia for a place in the final. However, they lost the final 1–0 to Litex Lovech.

Following the 2000-01 season, the owner of Velbazhd, Georgi Iliev, decided to merge the club with Plovdiv-based team Lokomotiv Plovdiv, and move the new club to Plovdiv, with the intention of reviving Lokomotiv Plovdiv, who were struggling financially in the B group. Thus, starting from the 2001-02 season, Lokomotiv Plovdiv began playing in the A Group, while Velbazhd practically ceased to exist and disappeared.

Shortly after the dissolution, the club was re-established, starting from the third tier, V Group.

In the summer of 2024, the team merged with FC Kyustendil, with Velbazhd becoming a satellite team and Kyustendil staying in Third League.

== Honours ==
=== Domestic ===
Bulgarian A Group:

- Third place (3): 1998–99, 1999–00, 2000–01

Bulgarian Cup:

- Runners-up (1): 2001

== European record ==
Season	Tournament	Round	Club	Home	Away	Aggregate
2000	Intertoto Cup	1	(Republic of Ireland) UCD	0-0	3-3	3-3 (away goals rule)
2000	Intertoto Cup	2	(Czech Republic) SK Sigma Olomouc	2-0	0-8	2-8

== Current squad ==
As of 1 September 2015 Note: Flags indicate national team as defined under FIFA eligibility rules; some limited exceptions apply. Players may hold more than one non-FIFA nationality.

No.	Pos.	Nation	Player
1	GK	BUL	Kiril Kirilov (captain)
3	DF	BUL	Ivo Velinov
4	DF	BUL	Antonio Stilyanov
6	DF	BUL	Boyan Stoynev
8	FW	BUL	Denis Sharankov
9	MF	BUL	Aleksandar Dimitrov
10	MF	BUL	Atanas Penkov
11	MF	BUL	Yordan Yovchev
13	FW	BUL	Dimitar Barbulov

No.	Pos.	Nation	Player
14	MF	BUL	Aleksandar Handzhiyski
15	DF	BUL	Nikolay Nakov
16	DF	BUL	Emil Stoyanov
17	MF	BUL	Martin Kaleov
21	MF	BUL	Lyuboslav Aleksandrov
22	MF	BUL	Kostadin Kukov
24	MF	BUL	Denis Nechemski
46	GK	BUL	Radoslav Dimitrov

== Notable former players ==
The following is a list of notable footballers who have played for Velbazhd, with over 60 appearances, over 30 goals or having received recognition by their country in the form of international caps while playing for the club.

Bulgaria

- (Bulgaria) Antoni Zdravkov
- (Bulgaria) Plamen Petrov
- (Bulgaria) Daniel Hristov
- (Bulgaria) Georgi Petrov
- (Bulgaria) Ivo Mihaylov

- (Bulgaria) Ilian Stoyanov
- (Bulgaria) Velko Hristev
- (Bulgaria) Petar Kolev
- (Bulgaria) Boyko Velichkov
- (Bulgaria) Mihail Mihaylov

Kyrgyzstan

- (Kyrgyzstan) Nematjan Zakirov

Macedonia

- (North Macedonia) Vančo Trajanov

Note: For all Velbazhd Kyustendil players with a Wikipedia article, see Category:Velbazhd Kyustendil players.
