= 1997 Bulgarian Cup final =

- Event: 1996–97 Bulgarian Cup
Levski Sofia	CSKA Sofia
A Group	A Group
1	3
- Date: 28 May 1997
- Venue: Vasil Levski Stadium, Sofia
- Referee: Atanas Uzunov (Plovdiv)
- Attendance: 18,500

The 1997 Bulgarian Cup final was played at the Vasil Levski National Stadium in Sofia on 28 May 1997, and was contested between the sides of CSKA Sofia and Levski Sofia. The match was won by CSKA Sofia.

== Match ==
=== Details ===
28 May 1997
18:00 EEST

Levski Sofia	1–3	CSKA Sofia
Gospodinov 51'		Lulchev 9'; Zhabov 48'; M. Petkov 58'

Vasil Levski National Stadium, Sofia
Attendance: 18,500
Referee: Atanas Uzunov (Plovdiv)

Levski	CSKA

Levski:
GK	1	(Bulgaria) Dimitar Ivankov
DF	2	(Bulgaria) Emil Kremenliev (c)
DF	3	(Bulgaria) Valentin Dartilov
DF	4	(Bulgaria) Vladimir Ivanov (yellow card)
DF	5	(Bulgaria) Stanimir Gospodinov
MF	6	(Bulgaria) Vladimir Yonkov
MF	7	(Bulgaria) Viktorio Pavlov
MF	8	(Bulgaria) Marian Hristov
MF	9	(Bulgaria) Zahari Sirakov
MF	10	(Bulgaria) Todor Zaytsev	(substituted off) 59'
FW	11	(Bulgaria) Hristo Yovov
Substitutes:
GK	12	(Bulgaria) Krasimir Kolev
MF	13	(Bulgaria) Tsvetomir Chipev
DF	14	(Bulgaria) Elin Topuzakov
DF	15	(Bulgaria) Milen Penchev
MF	16	(Bulgaria) Veselin Sarbakov
FW	17	(Bulgaria) Anatoli Tonov (yellow card)	(substituted in) 59'
FW	18	(Bulgaria) Georgi Varadev
Manager:
(Bulgaria) Andrey Zhelyazkov

CSKA:
GK	1	(Bulgaria) Ilian Vasilev
DF	2	(Bulgaria) Adalbert Zafirov
DF	3	(Bulgaria) Filip Filipov	(substituted off) 85'
DF	4	(Bulgaria) Stefan Lulchev (yellow card)
DF	5	(Bulgaria) Dobromir Mitov
MF	6	(Bulgaria) Milen Petkov
MF	7	(Bulgaria) Georgi Slavchev (yellow card)	(substituted off) 70'
MF	8	(Bulgaria) Anatoli Nankov (c)
FW	9	(Bulgaria) Petar Zhabov	(substituted off) 54'
FW	10	(Bulgaria) Ivaylo Andonov
MF	11	(Bulgaria) Georgi Yordanov
Substitutes:
GK	12	(Bulgaria) Petko Petkov
DF	13	(Bulgaria) Galin Ivanov	(substituted in) 70'
FW	14	(Bulgaria) Kancho Yordanov
MF	15	(Bulgaria) Iliya Voynov
FW	16	(Bulgaria) Dimitar Ivanov	(substituted in) 54'
DF	17	(North Macedonia) Risto Milosavov
MF	18	(Bulgaria) Ivo Slavchev	(substituted in) 85'
Manager:
(Bulgaria) Georgi Vasilev

MAN OF THE MATCH

MATCH OFFICIALS

- Assistant referees:Ivan Lekov (Sofia) and Yordan Yordanov (Razgrad)
- Fourth official: Stefan Ormandzhiev (Sofia)

MATCH RULES

- 90 minutes.
- 30 minutes of extra-time if necessary.
- Penalty shoot-out if scores still level.
- Seven named substitutes.
- Maximum of three substitutions.

== See also ==
- 1996–97 A Group
