= 1996–97 A Group =

49th completed season of top-tier football league in Bulgaria

A Group
- Season: 1996–97
- Dates: 9 August 1996 – 1 June 1997
- Champions: CSKA Sofia (28th title)
- Relegated: Maritsa; Montana; Rakovski
- Champions League: CSKA
- UEFA Cup: Neftochimic
- Matches: 240
- Goals: 705 (2.94 per match)
- Top goalscorer: Todor Pramatarov (26 goals)

The 1996–97 A Group was the 49th season of the A Football Group, the top Bulgarian professional league for association football clubs, since its establishment in 1948.

== Overview ==
It was contested by 16 teams, and CSKA Sofia won the championship.

== Team information ==
=== Stadia and locations ===
The following teams have ensured their participation in A Group for season 1996–97 (listed in alphabetical order):

Location of teams in 1996–97 A Group
Sofia 1996–97 A Group football clubs

Team	City	Stadium	Capacity
Botev	Plovdiv	Hristo Botev	18,000
CSKA	Sofia	Bulgarian Army	22,995
Dobrudzha	Dobrich	Druzhba	12,500
Etar	Veliko Tarnovo	Ivaylo	18,000
Levski	Kyustendil	Osogovo	10,000
Levski	Sofia	Georgi Asparuhov	29,986
Lokomotiv	Plovdiv	Lokomotiv	24,000
Lokomotiv	Sofia	Lokomotiv	22,000
Maritsa	Plovdiv	Maritsa	5,000
Minyor	Pernik	Minyor	18,000
Montana	Montana	Ogosta	8,000
Neftochimic	Burgas	Lazur	18,037
Rakovski	Ruse	Gradski	20,000
Slavia	Sofia	Ovcha Kupel	18,000
Spartak	Pleven	Slavi Aleksiev	21,940
Spartak	Varna	Spartak	8,000

== League standings ==
Pos	Team	Pld	W	D	L	GF	GA	GD	Pts	Qualification or relegation
1	CSKA Sofia (C)	30	22	5	3	65	19	+46	71	Qualification for Champions League first qualifying round
2	Neftochimic Burgas	30	20	7	3	70	20	+50	67	Qualification for UEFA Cup first qualifying round
3	Slavia Sofia	30	17	6	7	61	23	+38	57	
4	Levski Sofia	30	14	11	5	58	30	+28	53	Qualification for Cup Winners' Cup qualifying round
5	Botev Plovdiv	30	14	3	13	41	41	0	45	
6	Minyor Pernik	30	12	8	10	28	35	−7	44	
7	Lokomotiv Sofia	30	13	4	13	59	47	+12	43	
8	Levski Kyustendil	30	13	3	14	51	52	−1	42	
9	Spartak Varna	30	13	3	14	40	41	−1	42	Qualification for Intertoto Cup group stage
10	Lokomotiv Plovdiv	30	12	5	13	38	41	−3	41	
11	Dobrudzha Dobrich	30	11	6	13	44	48	−4	39	
12	Spartak Pleven	30	12	3	15	35	46	−11	39	
13	Etar Veliko Tarnovo	30	10	5	15	37	53	−16	35	
14	Maritsa Plovdiv (R)	30	8	8	14	38	45	−7	32	Relegation to 1997–98 B Group
15	Montana (R)	30	8	4	18	32	54	−22	28	Relegation to 1997–98 B Group
16	Rakovski Ruse (R)	30	0	1	29	8	110	−102	1	Relegation to 1997–98 B Group

Source: rsssf.com
(C) Champions; (R) Relegated

== Results ==
Home \ Away	BOT	CSK	DOB	ETA	LVK	LEV	LPL	LSO	MAR	MIN	MON	NEF	RAK	SLA	SPL	SPV
Botev Plovdiv		0–3	3–0	2–1	3–0	4–3	0–1	3–1	2–2	2–2	1–0	0–1	3–0	1–0	3–1	4–3
CSKA Sofia	1–0		2–0	5–1	4–2	1–1	4–1	0–1	3–1	2–1	3–0	1–0	9–0	0–0	4–0	4–1
Dobrudzha Dobrich	2–2	0–0		2–0	2–0	1–1	2–1	2–0	3–1	1–0	2–0	1–1	4–0	0–0	3–2	3–0
Etar Veliko Tarnovo	2–0	0–1	4–3		2–2	1–1	2–0	2–4	2–1	0–0	1–0	0–0	5–0	3–2	1–0	1–0
Levski Kyustendil	2–0	0–1	2–1	2–0		3–0	2–2	2–1	1–0	5–1	2–0	3–1	3–1	1–3	5–1	3–1
Levski Sofia	0–1	0–2	5–0	6–0	6–1		2–1	2–0	2–2	0–0	4–1	1–1	3–0	2–2	4–1	4–0
Lokomotiv Plovdiv	2–0	1–1	2–1	2–0	3–1	0–2		3–0	2–1	2–0	4–0	1–5	5–1	0–1	2–0	1–2
Lokomotiv Sofia	3–0	1–2	4–0	2–0	4–3	2–3	0–0		2–0	4–1	1–0	2–2	7–0	2–3	1–2	3–1
Maritsa Plovdiv	0–1	1–2	1–0	3–1	4–3	0–0	1–1	2–2		1–1	2–0	0–5	8–0	0–0	2–2	1–0
Minyor Pernik	2–1	0–1	2–0	1–1	1–0	0–0	3–0	2–1	2–1		2–1	0–0	1–0	1–1	1–0	1–0
Montana	2–0	3–1	3–2	2–1	1–1	1–1	0–0	4–3	0–1	0–1		0–1	3–0	1–2	2–0	1–1
Neftochimic Burgas	2–0	2–1	5–0	5–0	2–0	4–1	4–0	1–1	2–0	1–0	5–1		2–0	1–1	3–1	3–1
Rakovski Ruse	0–1	0–2	1–7	0–4	0–1	0–1	0–1	2–4	0–2	1–2	2–5	0–6		0–7	0–0	0–2
Slavia Sofia	2–1	1–3	3–0	2–0	3–0	1–2	4–0	3–1	2–0	4–0	5–0	0–1	6–0		1–2	1–0
Spartak Pleven	1–2	1–1	2–1	2–1	2–0	0–1	1–0	0–2	2–0	2–0	3–1	2–1	2–0	0–1		3–2
Spartak Varna	2–1	0–1	1–1	3–1	2–1	0–0	1–0	2–0	2–0	3–0	2–0	2–3	4–0	1–0	1–0	

Source: A PFG (in Bulgarian)
Legend: Blue = home team win; Yellow = draw; Red = away team win.

== Champions ==
CSKA Sofia

Goalkeepers
(Bulgaria) Petko Petkov	30	(0)
(Bulgaria) Iliyan Vasilev	0	(0)

Defenders
(Bulgaria) Adalbert Zafirov	28	(2)
(Bulgaria) Filip Filipov	21	(1)
(Bulgaria) Stefan Lulchev	14	(0)
(Bulgaria) Zdravko Radev	3	(0)
(Bulgaria) Dobromir Mitov	25	(3)
(Bulgaria) Galin Ivanov	20	(0)

Midfielders
(Bulgaria) Anatoli Nankov	27	(2)
(North Macedonia) Risto Milosavov	24	(3)
(Bulgaria) Iliya Voynov	20	(4)
(Bulgaria) Ivo Slavchev	20	(2)
(Bulgaria) Nikolay Nikolov	5	(1)
(Bulgaria) Georgi Slavchev	6	(0)
(Bulgaria) Kostadin Vidolov*	15	(1)
(Bulgaria) Stiliyan Petrov	5	(0)
(Bulgaria) Ivan Tanchovski	1	(0)
(Bulgaria) Metodi Deyanov	14	(3)
(Bulgaria) Milen Petkov	26	(3)
(Bulgaria) Georgi Yordanov	12	(1)

Forwards
(Bulgaria) Ivaylo Andonov	25	(18)
(Cape Verde) Jair	6	(3)
(Bulgaria) Petar Zhabov	22	(9)
(Bulgaria) Martin Petrov	3	(1)
(Bulgaria) Dimitar Ivanov	24	(4)
(Bulgaria) Kancho Yordanov	11	(2)
(Bulgaria) Rumen Hristov*	4	(1)
(Bulgaria) Bozhidar Yankov	4	(0)

Manager
(Bulgaria) Georgi Vasilev

- Vidolov and Hristov left the club during a season.

== Top scorers ==
Rank	Scorer	Club	Goals
1	(Bulgaria) Todor Pramatarov	Slavia Sofia	26
2	(Bulgaria) Hristo Marashliev	Levski Kyustendil (9); Spartak Varna (11)	20
3	(Bulgaria) Ivaylo Andonov	CSKA Sofia	18
4	(Bulgaria) Geno Dobrevski	Botev Plovdiv	13
5	(Bulgaria) Mihail Mihaylov	Levski Kyustendil	12
6	(Bulgaria) Emil Mitsanski	Dobrudzha	11
6	(Bulgaria) Todor Zaytsev	Levski Sofia	11
8	(Bulgaria) Georgi Ivanov	Lokomotiv Plovdiv	10
8	(Bulgaria) Iliya Gruev	Neftochimic	10
10	(Bulgaria) Boris Hvoynev	Botev Plovdiv	9
10	(Bulgaria) Petar Zhabov	CSKA Sofia	9
10	(Bulgaria) Plamen Petrov	Levski Kyustendil	9
10	(Bulgaria) Marian Hristov	Levski Sofia	9
10	(Bulgaria) Aleksandar Aleksandrov	Maritsa	9

- Source:1996–97 Top Goalscorers
