= 1999 Bulgarian Cup final =

- Event: 1998–99 Bulgarian Cup
Litex Lovech	CSKA Sofia
A Group	A Group
0	1
- Date: 26 May 1999
- Venue: Balgarska Armia, Sofia
- Man of the Match: Valentin Stanchev
- Referee: Atanas Uzunov (Plovdiv)
- Attendance: 8,000

The 1999 Bulgarian Cup final was played at the Bulgarian Army Stadium in Sofia on 26 May 1999, and was contested between the sides of Litex Lovech and CSKA Sofia. The match was won by CSKA Sofia, Valentin Stanchev scored the winning goal.

== Match ==
=== Details ===
26 May 1999
18:00 EEST

Litex Lovech	0–1	CSKA Sofia
		Stanchev 82'

Stadion Balgarska Armia, Sofia
Attendance: 8,000
Referee: Atanas Uzunov (Plovdiv)

Litex	CSKA

Litex:
GK	12	(Bulgaria) Stoyan Stavrev
DF	13	(Bulgaria) Nikolay Dimitrov
DF	3	(Bulgaria) Zhivko Zhelev
DF	4	(Bulgaria) Stefan Kolev (c)
DF	25	(Bulgaria) Radostin Kishishev (yellow card) (substituted off) 66'
MF	2	(Romania) Laurenţiu Reghecampf
MF	7	(Bulgaria) Marian Todorov (substituted off) 59'
MF	8	(Bulgaria) Stoycho Stoilov (substituted off) 46'
MF	22	(Albania) Altin Haxhi
FW	14	(Albania) Alban Bushi (yellow card)
FW	20	(Bulgaria) Svetoslav Todorov
Substitutes:
MF	6	(Bulgaria) Rosen Emilov (substituted on) 66'
MF	10	(Bulgaria) Vasil Kirov (substituted on) 46'
MF	18	(Bulgaria) Ivaylo Petev (substituted on) 59'
Manager:
(Bulgaria) Ferario Spasov

CSKA:
GK	12	(Bulgaria) Ivaylo Ivanov
DF	2	(Bulgaria) Emil Kremenliev
DF	15	(Bulgaria) Adalbert Zafirov
DF	5	(Bulgaria) Stefan Lulchev
MF	3	(Bulgaria) Krasimir Chomakov
MF	16	(Bulgaria) Stiliyan Petrov
MF	10	(Bulgaria) Metodi Deyanov
MF	11	(Bulgaria) Milen Petkov (substituted off) 58'
FW	9	(Bulgaria) Valentin Stanchev
FW	19	(Bulgaria) Dimitar Berbatov (substituted off) 36'
FW	20	(Bulgaria) Asen Bukarev (substituted off) 68'
Substitutes:
MF	6	(Bulgaria) Ivo Slavchev (substituted on) 58'
FW	13	(Bulgaria) Miroslav Nikolov (substituted on) 36'
DF	21	(Bulgaria) Stanislav Angelov (substituted on) 63'
Manager:
(Bulgaria) Dimitar Penev

== See also ==
- 1998–99 A Group
