= 1996–97 Bulgarian Cup =

Tournament details
- Country: Bulgaria

Final positions
- Champions: CSKA Sofia (16th cup)
- Runners-up: Levski Sofia

The 1996–97 Bulgarian Cup was the 57th season of the Bulgarian Cup. CSKA Sofia won the competition, beating Levski Sofia 3–1 in the final at the Vasil Levski National Stadium in Sofia.

== First round ==
Team 1	Score	Team 2
12 November 1996
Devnya (III)	1–1 (a.e.t.) (3–4 p)	Lokomotiv Sofia (I)
Lokomotiv Ruse (II)	1–0	Lokomotiv Plovdiv (I)
Chernomorets Burgas (II)	2–1	Spartak Varna (I)
13 November 1996
Granichar Svilengrad (III)	4–2	Rakovski Ruse (I)
Sokol '94 Plovdiv (III)	2–0	Levski Kyustendil (I)
Montana (I)	2–0	Olimpik Galata (II)
Chergan (IV)	0–3	Maritsa Plovdiv (I)
Chirpan (II)	2–0	Minyor Pernik (I)
Lokomotiv GO (II)	0–3	CSKA Sofia (I)
Neftochimic Burgas (I)	1–2	Litex Lovech (II)
Dobrudzha Dobrich (I)	1–0	Storgozia Pleven (III)
Novi Iskar (III)	2–2 (a.e.t.) (5–4 p)	Etar Veliko Tarnovo (I)
Metalurg Pernik (II)	0–2	Levski Sofia (I)
Spartak Pleven (I)	1–2	Pirin Blagoevgrad (II)
Port Burgas (III)	0–3	Slavia Sofia (I)
Akademik Sofia (II)	1–0 (a.e.t.)	Botev Plovdiv (I)

== Second round ==
Team 1	Agg.	Team 2	1st leg	2nd leg
27 November / 5 December 1996
Sokol '94 Plovdiv (III)	2–5	Levski Sofia (I)	0–2	2–3
4 / 11 December 1996
Slavia Sofia (I)	3–1	Lokomotiv Ruse (II)	2–1	1–0
4 / 13 December 1996
Litex Lovech (II)	5–3	Dobrudzha Dobrich (I)	5–1	0–2
Chernomorets Burgas (II)	3–8	Lokomotiv Sofia (I)	2–5	1–3
CSKA Sofia (I)	6–0	Montana (I)	5–0	1–1
4 / 18 December 1996
Pirin Blagoevgrad (II)	6–3	Granichar Svilengrad (III)	4–1	2–2
Maritsa Plovdiv (I)	6–2	Novi Iskar (III)	4–0	2–2
Chirpan (II)	4–5	Akademik Sofia (II)	3–2	1–3

== Quarter-finals ==
Team 1	Agg.	Team 2	1st leg	2nd leg
5 / 19 March 1997
Litex Lovech (II)	3–4	Levski Sofia (I)	2–0	1–4
Slavia Sofia (I)	1–3	CSKA Sofia (I)	1–1	0–2
Akademik Sofia (II)	1–2	Maritsa Plovdiv (I)	1–1	0–1
Lokomotiv Sofia (I)	2–2 (2–3 p)	Pirin Blagoevgrad (II)	2–0	0–2 (a.e.t.)

== Semi-finals ==
Team 1	Agg.	Team 2	1st leg	2nd leg
9 / 22, 23 April 1997
Maritsa Plovdiv (I)	1–7	Levski Sofia (I)	1–3	0–4
Pirin Blagoevgrad (II)	1–2	CSKA Sofia (I)	1–0	0–2 (a.e.t.)

== Final ==
=== Details ===
28 May 1997
18:00 EEST

Levski Sofia	1–3	CSKA Sofia
Gospodinov 51'		Lulchev 9'; Zhabov 48'; M. Petkov 58'

Vasil Levski National Stadium, Sofia
Attendance: 18,500
Referee: Atanas Uzunov (Plovdiv)

Levski	CSKA
