= Slavchev =

Slavchev (Bulgarian: Славчев), female form Slavcheva (Bulgarian: Славчева), is a Bulgarian surname.

Notable people with this surname include:

- Anton Slavchev, Bulgarian footballer
- Evladiya Slavcheva-Stefanova, Bulgarian basketball player
- Georgi Slavchev, Bulgarian footballer
- Gergana Slavcheva, Bulgarian basketball player
- Ivo Slavchev, Bulgarian footballer
- Simeon Slavchev, Bulgarian footballer
- Slavin Slavchev, Bulgarian singer/songwriter
- Svetoslav Slavchev, Bulgarian writer
