= Dzhambazki =

Dzhambazki (masculine, Bulgarian: Джамбазки) or Dzhambazka (feminine, Bulgarian: Джамбазка) is a Bulgarian surname. Notable people with the surname include:

- Angel Dzhambazki (born 1979), Bulgarian politician
- Atanas Dzhambazki (born 1969), Bulgarian football manager and former player
