= Todor Pramatarov =

Bulgarian footballer

Personal information
- Date of birth: 8 August 1968 (age 58)
- Place of birth: Kresna, Bulgaria
- Position: Striker

Senior career*
Years	Team	Apps	(Gls)
1986–1989	FC Lyulin	72	(26)
1989–1990	Montana	35	(19)
1990–1991	Lokomotiv Sofia	29	(14)
1991	CSKA Sofia	14	(4)
1992	Slavia Sofia	26	(12)
1993	Shumen	19	(18)
1993	LEX Lovech	15	(10)
1994	Lokomotiv Sofia	14	(7)
1994	Montana	15	(6)
1994–1995	AO Kavala	12	(1)
1995–1996	Montana	30	(8)
1996–1997	Slavia Sofia	31	(27)
1998–1999	Shumen	42	(29)
1999–2000	Velbazhd Kyustendil	15	(3)
2001–2002	Pirin Blagoevgrad	20	(7)
2002–2003	Vihren Sandanski	31	(24)
2003–2004	Aris Limassol	17	(6)
Total		440	(223)

International career
	Bulgaria	2	(0)
- * Club domestic league appearances and goals

Todor Pramatarov (Bulgarian: Тодор Праматаров) (born 8 August 1968) is a former Bulgarian association football player. He was the top scorer of the 1997 championship (with 26 goals for Slavia Sofia).

A native of Sofia, Pramatarov played as a forward for FC Lyulin, PFC Montana, Lokomotiv Sofia, CSKA Sofia, Slavia Sofia, PFC Shumen, Litex Lovech, Greek AO Kavala, Velbazhd Kyustendil, Pirin Blagoevgrad, Vihren Sandanski and in Cypriot Aris Limassol.

During his career Pramatarov played in 440 matches and scored 223 goals. He holds the joint record (alongside three other players) of scoring the most goals in a single A PFG match, netting 6 times in the 7:0 win over Rakovski Ruse.
