= Galin Ivanov (footballer, born 1975) =

Bulgarian footballer and manager

Personal information
- Full name: Galin Ivanov
- Date of birth: 4 June 1975 (age 51)
- Place of birth: Dobrich, Bulgaria
- Height: 6 ft 1 in (1.85 m)
- Position: Midfielder

Team information
- Current team: CSKA Sofia (scout)

Senior career*
| Years | Team | Apps | (Gls) |
| 1992–1995 | Dobrudzha Dobrich | 69 | (4) |
| 1996–2003 | CSKA Sofia | 168 | (7) |
| 2003 | D.C. United | 24 | (1) |
| 2004 | Marek Dupnitza | 12 | (0) |
| 2004–2005 | Ergotelis | 7 | (0) |
| Total | | 214 | (9) |

International career^{‡}
| | Bulgaria U-18 | 7 | (0) |
| | Bulgaria U-21 | 25 | (0) |
| 2000–2002 | Bulgaria | 5 | (0) |

Managerial career
- 2015: CSKA Sofia (caretaker)
- 2015: Ludogorets Razgrad U-19
- 2015–2017: Ludogorets Razgrad II
- 2017–2019: Ludogorets Razgrad II (assistant)
- 2019–2020: Lokomotiv Sofia (assistant)
- 2021: Tsarsko Selo (youth)
- 2021–2023: CSKA 1948 (scout)
- 2024–: CSKA Sofia (scout)
- * Club domestic league appearances and goals as of 27 November 2011 ‡ National team caps and goals as of 27 November 2011

Galin Ivanov (born 6 April 1975) is a Bulgarian former football player and current football manager, who played both as a defender, as well as a midfielder. He made his name playing for CSKA Sofia in the Bulgarian A Professional Football Group, making a brief jump to the MLS in 2003. He is currently assistant coach of Bulgarian Second League club Ludogorets Razgrad II.

== Playing career ==
=== Club career ===
Ivanov started his career in 1992 at his local side FC Dobrudzha Dobrich before being acquired by Bulgarian First League giants CSKA Sofia in 1996. He stayed at the club until 2003, winning the Bulgarian First League Championship and Bulgarian Cup twice within a span of seven seasons. In 2003, Ivanov moved to the MLS signing a contract with D.C. United and joining up with compatriot Hristo Stoitchkov. In March 2004 he returned to the Bulgarian First League signing with Marek Dupnitza, where he made a total of 12 appearances until the end of the season. During the summer transfer window, Ivanov again moved countries, this time joining up with Greek top-flight newcomers Ergotelis. He managed to appear in 7 Alpha Ethniki matches before suffering a knee injury that kept him out for the rest of the tournament, which saw the club finish in 15th place and return to the Greek Second Division.

=== International career ===
Ivanov has represented Bulgaria in the youth teams earning 7 caps with the U-18 and 25 caps with the Bulgaria U-21 national football teams. He was called up to the senior team in 2000, earning a total of 5 caps within a two-year span.

== Manager career ==
=== CSKA Sofia ===
In March 2015, Ivanov was appointed as manager of the senior team.

On 24 March 2015 Galin was named as caretaker coach of CSKA after Stoycho Mladenov resigned. He was replaced by Luboslav Penev in late April 2015 due to CSKA's continued poor run of games in the A PFG.

=== Ludogorets Razgrad ===
In the summer of 2015 Ivanov took Ludogorets Razgrad U-19 team who plays in the Elite Youth League of Bulgaria. On 6 December 2015 he take care of Ludogorets Razgrad II team after the resignation of Veselin Branimirov just for one game, but on 7 January 2016 he was appointed as permanent manager who will lead the team in B Group. On 15 January 2017, following the appointment of Radoslav Zdravkov as new manager, Ivanov was demoted to assistant.

=== Managerial statistics ===
As of 7 December 2016

| Team | From | To | Record | | | | | | | |
| Team | From | To | G | W | D | L | Win % | GF | GA | GD |
|---|---|---|---|---|---|---|---|---|---|---|
| CSKA Sofia (caretaker) | 24 March 2015 | 28 April 2015 | 4 | 0 | 1 | 3 | 0.00 | 0 | 7 | −7 |
| Ludogorets Razgrad U-19 | 15 June 2015 | 31 December 2015 | 15 | 11 | 1 | 3 | 73.33 | 46 | 15 | +31 |
| Ludogorets Razgrad II | 5 December 2015 | present | 1 | 0 | 1 | 0 | 0.00 | 1 | 1 | +0 |
| Total | | | 20 | 11 | 3 | 6 | 55.00 | 47 | 23 | +24 |

== Honours ==
CSKA Sofia

- Bulgarian First League: 1996–97, 2002–03
- Bulgarian Cup: 1997, 1999
