= Tsvetomir =

Tsvetomir is a given name. Notable people with the name include:

- Tsvetomir Chipev (born 1977), Bulgarian footballer
- Tsvetomir Matev (born 1986), Bulgarian footballer
- Tsvetomir Panov (born 1989), Bulgarian footballer
- Tsvetomir Parvanov (born 1962), Bulgarian footballer
- Tsvetomir Todorov (born 1991), Bulgarian footballer
- Tsvetomir Tsankov (born 1984), Bulgarian footballer
- Tsvetomir Tsonkov (born 1981), Bulgarian footballer
- Tsvetomir Valeriev (born 1983), Bulgarian footballer
