= Chipev =

Chipev is a surname. Notable people with the surname include:

- Nikolay Chipev (born 1989), Bulgarian footballer
- Tsvetomir Chipev (born 1977), Bulgarian footballer
