= 1998–99 Bulgarian Cup =

Tournament details
- Country: Bulgaria

Final positions
- Champions: CSKA Sofia (17th title)
- Runners-up: Litex Lovech

The 1998–99 Bulgarian Cup was the 59th season of the Bulgarian Cup. CSKA Sofia won the competition, beating Litex Lovech 1–0 in the final at the Stadion Balgarska Armia in Sofia.

== First round ==
In this round entered winners from the preliminary rounds together with the teams from B Group.

Team 1	Score	Team 2
13 October 1998
Vidima-Rakovski (II)	2–0	Olympic Slivnitsa (IV)
Kaliakra Kavarna (III)	1–0	Spartak Pleven (II)
Spartak-S'94 Plovdiv (III)	1–0	Antibiotik-Ludogorets Razgrad (II)
Strumska Slava Radomir (IV)	3–1	Cherno More Varna (II)
Loviko Suhindol (III)	3–1	Haskovo (II)
Dzhebel (IV)	0–1	Dimitrovgrad (II)
Rodopa Smolyan (III)	1–0	Olimpik Teteven (II)
Satelit Stara Zagora (IV)	0–4	Akademik Sofia (II)
Perun Kresna (IV)	0–2	Belasitsa Petrich (II)
Port Burgas (III)	0–4	Kremikovtsi (II)
Bdin Vidin (III)	0–0 (a.e.t.) (3–4 p)	Botev Vratsa (II)
Hebar Pazardzhik (III)	0–1	Etar Veliko Tarnovo (II)
Marek Dupnitsa (III)	2–0	Svetkavitsa (II)
Planinets Apriltsi (III)	1–0	Chernomorets Burgas (II)
Devnya (III)	1–2	Maritsa Plovdiv (II)
Yambol (IV)	0–0 (a.e.t.) (2–3 p)	Chardafon Gabrovo (II)

== Second round ==
This round featured winners from the First Round and all teams from A Group.

Team 1	Score	Team 2
31 October 1998
Etar Veliko Tarnovo (II)	0–2	CSKA Sofia (I)
Spartak-S'94 Plovdiv (III)	0–2	Lokomotiv Sofia (I)
Dimitrovgrad (II)	0–2	Slavia Sofia (I)
Kaliakra Kavarna (III)	0–0 (a.e.t.) (3–5 p)	Botev Plovdiv (I)
Metalurg Pernik (I)	1–0	Chardafon Gabrovo (II)
Rodopa Smolyan (III)	1–3	Litex Lovech (I)
Strumska Slava Radomir (IV)	0–3	Spartak Varna (I)
Loviko Suhindol (III)	2–3 (a.e.t.)	Dobrudzha Dobrich (I)
Marek Dupnitsa (III)	1–2 (a.e.t.)	Minyor Pernik (I)
Neftochimic Burgas (I)	3–1	Kremikovtsi (II)
Levski Sofia (I)	4–0	Belasitsa Petrich (II)
Pirin Blagoevgrad (I)	2–1	Akademik Sofia (II)
Planinets Apriltsi (III)	1–1 (a.e.t.) (2–4 p)	Septemvri Sofia (I)
Vidima-Rakovski (II)	2–3 (a.e.t.)	Lokomotiv Plovdiv (I)
Botev Vratsa (II)	1–5	Shumen (I)
Maritsa Plovdiv (II)	0–3	Levski Kyustendil (I)

== Third round ==
Team 1	Agg.	Team 2	1st leg	2nd leg
28 November / 9 December 1998
Lokomotiv Sofia (I)	6–3	Botev Plovdiv (I)	4–2	2–1
Levski Sofia (I)	2–3	Slavia Sofia (I)	2–0	0–3
CSKA Sofia (I)	3–2	Septemvri Sofia (I)	2–0	1–2
Pirin Blagoevgrad (I)	5–3	Neftochimic Burgas (I)	3–0	2–3
Shumen (I)	2–8	Spartak Varna (I)	2–2	0–6
Dobrudzha Dobrich (I)	1–4	Levski Kyustendil (I)	1–2	0–2
Lokomotiv Plovdiv (I)	3–9	Minyor Pernik (I)	3–3	0–6
Metalurg Pernik (I)	1–4	Litex Lovech (I)	0–2	1–2

== Quarter-finals ==
Team 1	Agg.	Team 2	1st leg	2nd leg
10 March 1999 / 21 April 1999
CSKA Sofia (I)	6–2	Minyor Pernik (I)	2–1	4–1
Litex Lovech (I)	1–1 (4–2 p)	Slavia Sofia (I)	1–0	0–1 (a.e.t.)
Spartak Varna (I)	3–4	Levski Kyustendil (I)	2–1	1–3
Pirin Blagoevgrad (I)	2–3	Lokomotiv Sofia (I)	0–1	2–2

== Semi-finals ==
Team 1	Agg.	Team 2	1st leg	2nd leg
28 April 1999 / 12 May 1999
CSKA Sofia (I)	3–2	Levski Kyustendil (I)	1–0	2–2
Lokomotiv Sofia (I)	0–1	Litex Lovech (I)	0–0	0–1

== Final ==
=== Details ===
26 May 1999
18:00 EEST

Litex Lovech	0–1	CSKA Sofia
		Stanchev 82'

Stadion Balgarska Armia, Sofia
Attendance: 8,000
Referee: Atanas Uzunov (Plovdiv)

Litex	CSKA
