= Steve Traoré =

Beninese footballer (born 1998)

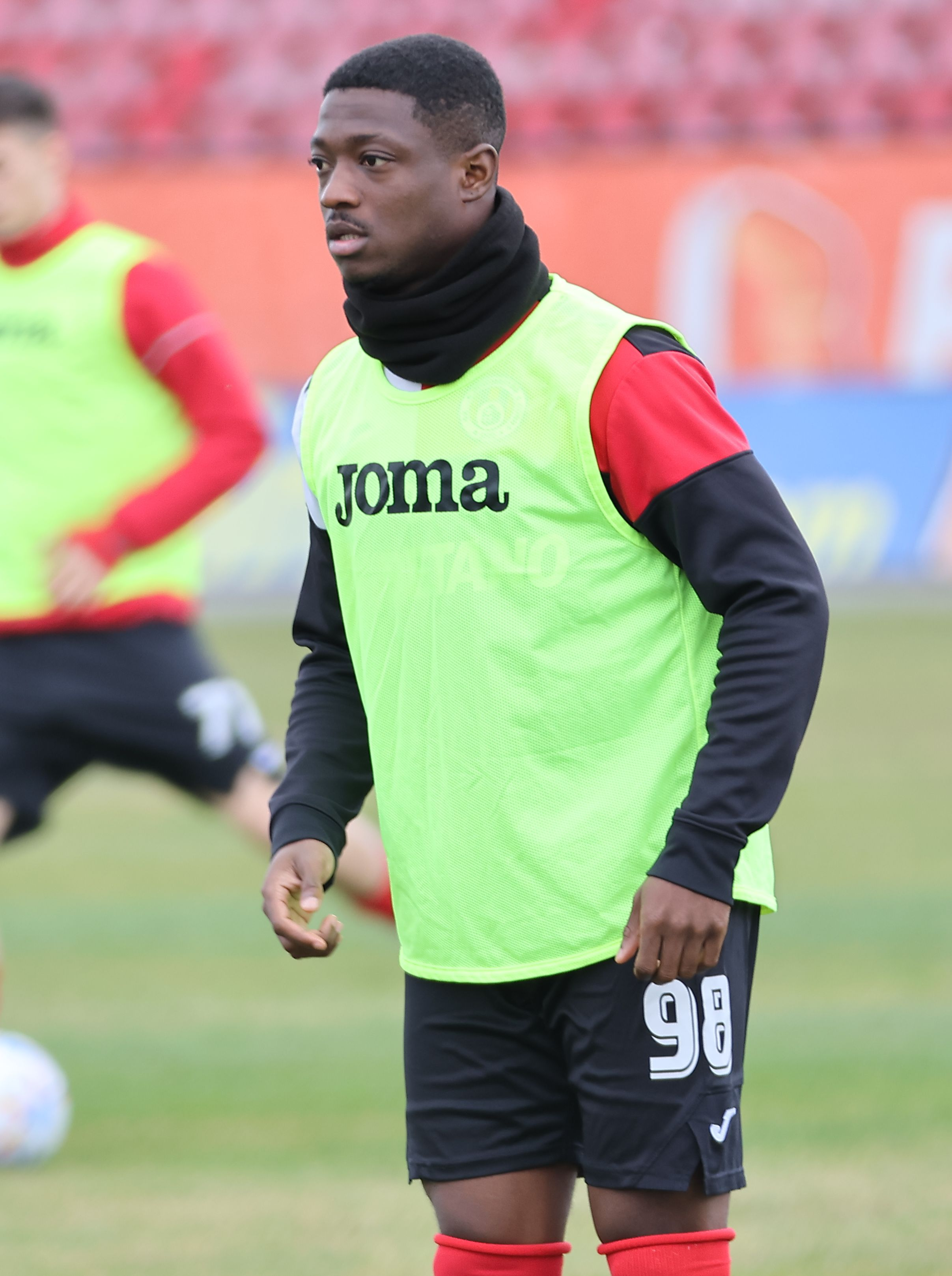
- Traoré with Lokomotiv Sofia in 2024

Personal information
- Full name: Steve-Waren Tiana Sean Jucher Traoré
- Date of birth: 18 February 1998 (age 28)
- Place of birth: Paris, France
- Height: 1.68 m (5 ft 6 in)
- Position: Winger

Team information
- Current team: Montana
- Number: 14

Youth career
- La Camillienne
- RC Joinville
- AS Montferrand
- Clermont

Senior career*
Years	Team	Apps	(Gls)
2016–2018	Clermont II	1	(0)
2018–2019	Bourges 18	9	(0)
2019–2021	Créteil II	21	(1)
2019–2021	Créteil	2	(0)
2021–2022	Sainte-Geneviève	19	(3)
2022	Beroe	16	(3)
2023	Shakhtyor Soligorsk	5	(0)
2023–2024	Lokomotiv Sofia	40	(3)
2025–2026	Haka	1	(0)
2026–	Montana	4	(0)

International career^{‡}
2023–	Benin	3	(0)
- * Club domestic league appearances and goals as of 4 November 2026 ‡ National team caps and goals as of 15 October 2024

Steve-Waren Tiana Sean Jucher Traoré (born 18 February 1998) is a professional footballer who plays as a winger for Bulgarian Second League club Montana. Born in France, he represents the Benin national team.

== Club career ==
Traoré began his senior career in 2016 with the reserves of Clermont. In April 2018, he moved to Bourges 18. After a season with them he transferred to Créteil in the Championnat National, where he mostly played with their reserves. He followed that up with a transfer to Sainte-Geneviève in 2021.

On 5 July 2022, Traoré moved to the Bulgarian club Beroe. On 31 March 2023, he moved to the Belarusian club Shakhtyor Soligorsk or the second half of the 2022–23 season. On 19 July 2023 he transferred to Lokomotiv Sofia on a contract until 2025.

On 28 January 2025, he signed for Haka in Veikkausliiga. On 19 May, his contract was terminated.

== International career ==
Traoré was born in France to an Ivorian father and Beninese mother, and holds both nationalities. He was called up to the Benin national team for a set of friendlies in October in 2023.

== Career statistics ==
=== Club ===
As of 19 May 2025

Appearances and goals by club, season and competition
Club	Season	League			Cup (Note: Includes Coupe de France, Bulgarian Cup, Belarusian Cup and Suomen Cup)		League cup (Note: Includes Finnish League Cup)		Total	
Club	Season	Division	Apps	Goals	Apps	Goals	Apps	Goals	Apps	Goals
Clermont II	2015–16	CFA 2	1	0	–		–		1	0
Bourges 18	2018–19	National 3	9	0	–		–		9	0
Créteil	2019–20	National	1	0	1	0	–		2	0
Créteil	2020–21	National	1	0	0	0	–		1	0
Créteil	Total		2	0	1	0	0	0	3	0
Créteil II	2019–20	National 3	17	1	–		–		17	1
Créteil II	2020–21	National 3	4	0	–		–		1	0
Créteil II	Total		21	1	0	0	0	0	21	1
Sainte-Geneviève	2021–22	National 2	19	3	1	0	–		20	3
Beroe	2022–23	Bulgarian First League	16	3	2	0	–		18	3
Shakhtyor Soligorsk	2023	Belarusian Premier League	5	0	–		–		5	0
Lokomotiv Sofia	2023–24	Bulgarian First League	26	3	–		–		26	3
Lokomotiv Sofia	2024–25	Bulgarian First League	14	0	1	0	–		15	0
Lokomotiv Sofia	Total		40	3	1	0	0	0	41	3
Haka	2025	Veikkausliiga	1	0	1	0	4	0	6	0
Career total			114	10	6	0	4	0	124	10

=== International ===
As of match played 15 October 2024

Benin
Year	Apps	Goals
2023	2	0
2024	1 (Note: Appearance(s) in 2025 Africa Cup of Nations qualification)	0
Total	2	0
