= Krasimir Chomakov =

Bulgarian footballer (born 1977)

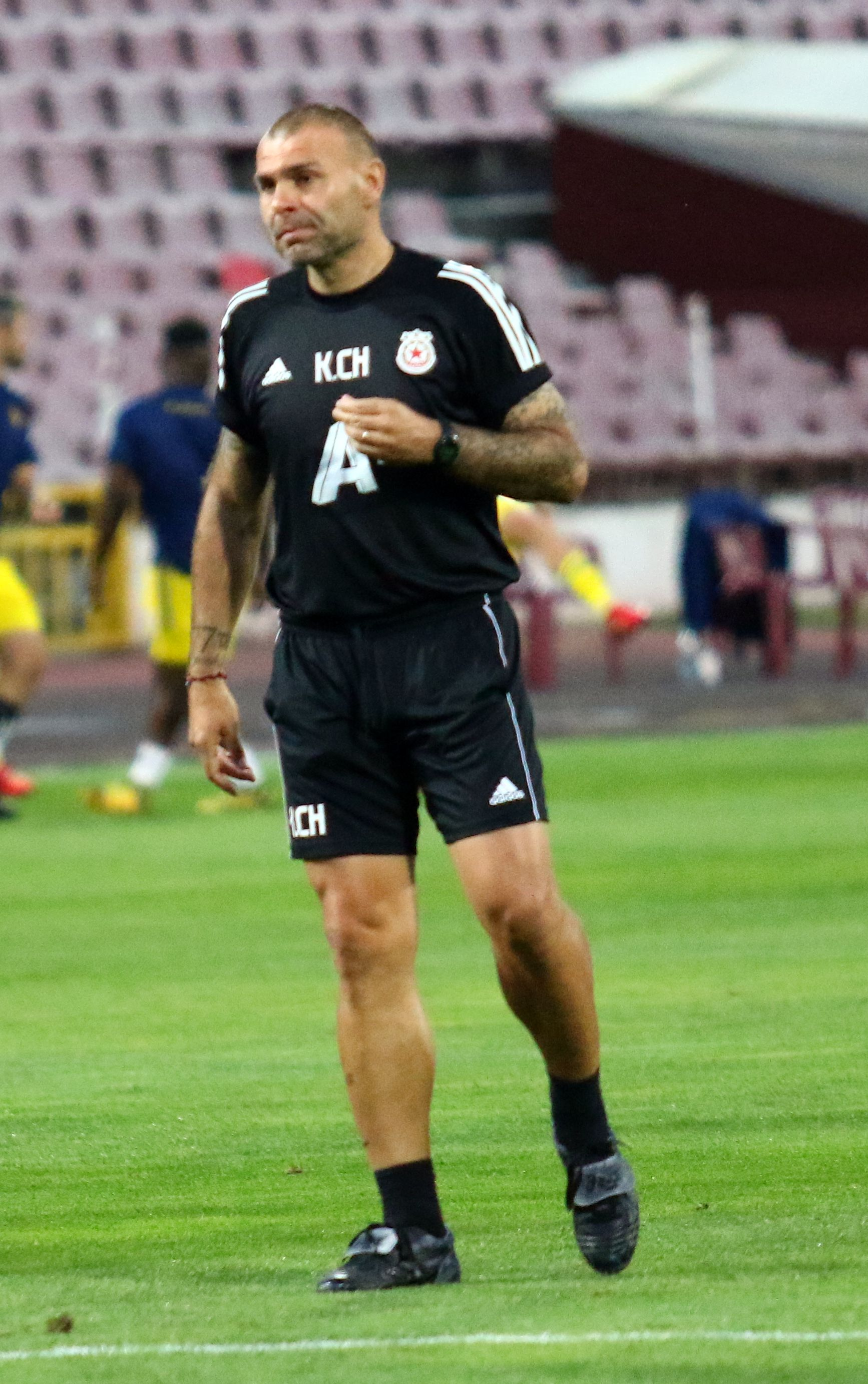

Personal information
- Full name: Krasimir Petkov Chomakov
- Date of birth: 8 June 1977 (age 49)
- Place of birth: Plovdiv, Bulgaria
- Height: 1.82 m (6 ft 0 in)
- Position: Midfielder

Youth career
- –1994: Maritsa Plovdiv

Senior career*
Years	Team	Apps	(Gls)
1994–1997	Maritsa Plovdiv	77	(19)
1997–2000	CSKA Sofia	63	(10)
2000–2001	Ravenna	30	(2)
2001–2002	Lecce	4	(0)
2002	Panionios	10	(0)
2002–2007	Boca San Lazzaro	131	(45)
2007	Pizzighettone	13	(3)
2007–2009	Cremonese	33	(3)
2009	→ Lecco (loan)	13	(1)
2009	Spartak Plovdiv	11	(1)
2010–2012	Zola Predosa	51	(16)
2012–2013	Castenaso Van Goof	32	(6)
Total		468	(106)

International career
	Bulgaria U21	33	(5)
1995–2001	Bulgaria	14	(5)

Managerial career
- 2020–2021: CSKA Sofia (assistant)
- * Club domestic league appearances and goals

Krasimir Petkov Chomakov (Bulgarian: Красимир Чомаков; born 8 June 1977 in Plovdiv) is a former Bulgarian footballer who played as a midfielder.

== Career ==
Chomakov is a former Bulgarian international and played with Maritsa Plovdiv, CSKA Sofia, Ravenna and Lecce. In 2002, after a short spell at Greek side Panionios, he opted to return to Italy and signed for then-Serie D club Boca San Lazzaro, where he played in a more attacking role, scoring 5 goals in 5 seasons (four in Serie D, plus one in Serie C2). In January 2007, he agreed a loan deal to Serie C1 Pizzighettone. In July 2007 he moved to Serie C1 Cremonese.

In February 2009 he was loaned out to Lega Pro Prima Divisione side Lecco for the remainder of the season. During his playing days Chomakov established a reputation as a skillful free kick taker.

=== International career ===
Chomakov is a former member of the Bulgaria U21 team, making 33 appearances and scoring 5 goals. He earned his first cap for Bulgaria on 20 July 1995, in the 0:0 draw with Uzbekistan in a friendly match.

=== Personal life ===
He is a fan of CSKA Sofia and Liverpool F.C. Chomakov is married and has a daughter named Alesiya. He helps with the sponsorship of amateur side Chernozemen.

=== International goals ===
Scores and results list Bulgaria's goal tally first.

#	Date	Venue	Opponent	Score	Result	Competition
1.	9 February 2000	Estadio Playa Ancha, Valparaíso, Chile	Slovakia	1–0	1–0	Ciudad de Valparaíso Tournament
2.	24 January 2001	Estadio Morelos, Morelia, Mexico	Mexico	2–0	2–0	Friendly match
3.	28 February 2001	Prince Hussein Bin Abdullah Sports Complex, Amman, Jordan	Jordan	1–0	2–0	Friendly match
4.	24 March 2001	Balgarska Armia Stadium, Sofia, Bulgaria	Iceland	1–1	2–1	2002 World Cup qualifier
5.	28 March 2001	Balgarska Armia Stadium, Sofia, Bulgaria	Northern Ireland	3–1	4–3	2002 World Cup qualifier

== Honours ==
=== Club ===
- CSKA Sofia
  - Bulgarian Cup (1): 1998–99
