= Dobromir Mitov =

Bulgarian footballer and manager

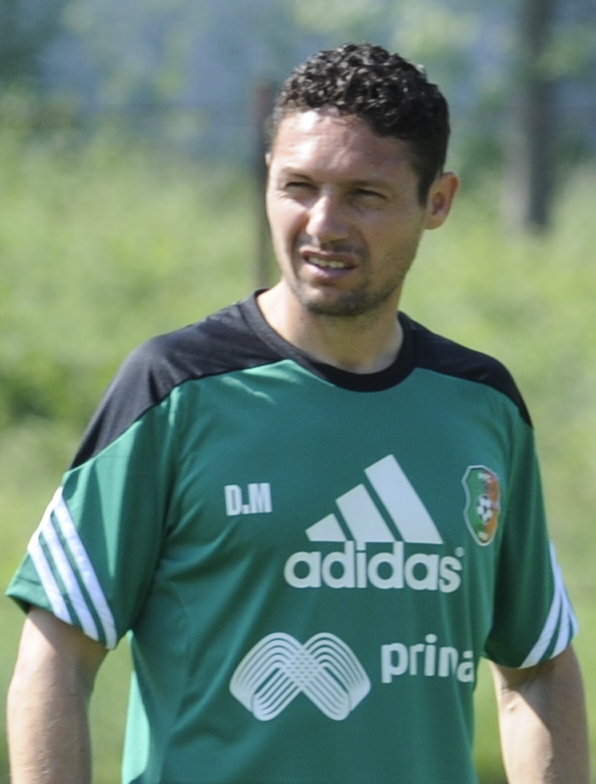

Personal information
- Full name: Dobromir Boykov Mitov
- Date of birth: 3 April 1972 (age 54)
- Place of birth: Blagoevgrad, Bulgaria
- Height: 1.85 m (6 ft 1 in)
- Position: Defender

Senior career*
Years	Team	Apps	(Gls)
1991–1994	Pirin Blagoevgrad		
1994	Botev Plovdiv	15	(1)
1995–1998	CSKA Sofia	84	(5)
1999–2000	Lokomotiv Sofia	32	(2)
2001	CSKA Sofia	2	(0)
2001–2002	Lokomotiv Plovdiv	5	(0)
2002–2003	Rilski Sportist	12	(0)
2003–2005	Pirin 1922	18	(1)
2005–2007	Marek Dupnitsa	37	(0)

International career
1997	Bulgaria	1	(0)

Managerial career
- 2007–2008: Belasitsa Petrich (assistant)
- 2008–2009: Belasitsa Petrich
- 2009: Pirin Blagoevgrad (assistant)
- 2009: Vihren Sandanski (assistant)
- 2010: Lokomotiv Plovdiv (assistant)
- 2010–2013: CSKA Sofia (youth team)
- 2013: CSKA Sofia (assistant)
- 2013–2014: Litex Lovech (assistant)
- 2015–2016: Pirin Blagoevgrad (assistant)
- 2016–2019: CSKA Sofia (youth team)
- 2019–2020: CSKA Sofia (assistant)
- 2019: CSKA Sofia (caretaker)
- 2019: CSKA Sofia (caretaker)
- 2020–2023: CSKA Sofia (youth team)
- 2023: Litex Lovech
- 2023–2024: Litex Lovech (assistant)
- * Club domestic league appearances and goals

Dobromir Mitov (Bulgarian: Добромир Митов; born 3 April 1972) is a retired Bulgarian football defender.

== Honours ==
=== Club ===
CSKA Sofia

- A Group: 1996–97
- Bulgarian Cup: 1996–97
