= Filip Filipov (footballer, born 1971) =

Bulgarian footballer and manager

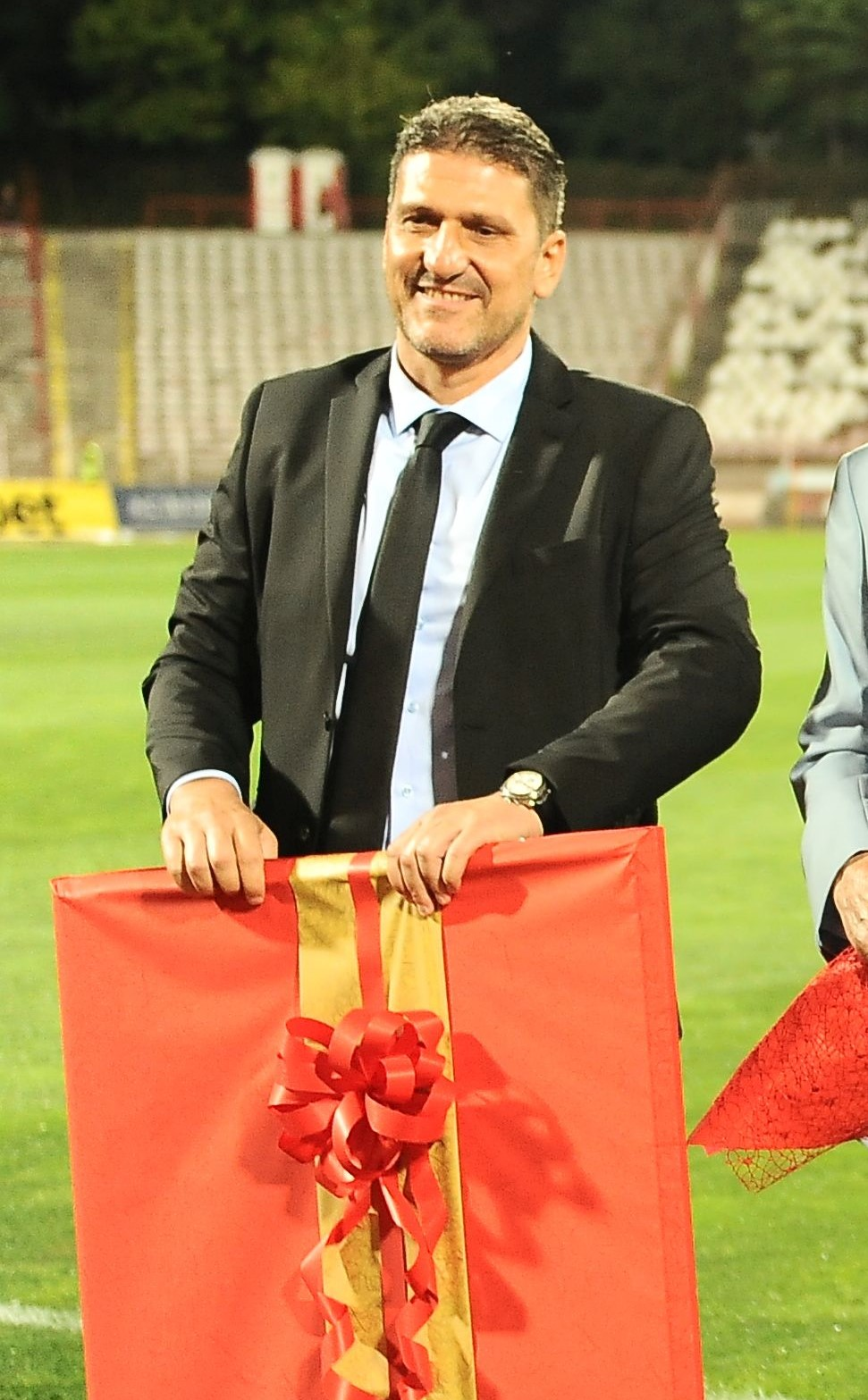

Personal information
- Full name: Filip Pavlov Filipov
- Date of birth: 31 January 1971 (age 55)
- Place of birth: Sofia, Bulgaria
- Position: Defender

Youth career
- 1981–1989: CSKA Sofia

Senior career*
Years	Team	Apps	(Gls)
1989–1991	CSKA Sofia	4	(0)
1989–1990	→ Sliven (loan)	0	(0)
1990	→ Cherno More (loan)	12	(0)
1991–1992	Lokomotiv GO	27	(2)
1992–1993	Yukong Elephant	13	(0)
1994–1995	CSKA Sofia	18	(0)
1995	Litex Lovech		
1996	CSKA Sofia	13	(0)
1996	Antalyaspor	1	(0)
1996–1997	CSKA Sofia	34	(3)
1998–1999	Bucheon SK	17	(0)
2000	Slavia Sofia		
2001	Marek Dupnitsa		

Managerial career
- 2007: Bulgaria U17
- 2007–2009: Vihren Sandanski
- 2009–2010: Kaliakra Kavarna
- 2011–2012: CSKA Sofia (assistant)
- 2021–2025: CSKA Sofia (sports director)
- * Club domestic league appearances and goals

Filip Filipov (Bulgarian: Филип Филипов; born 31 January 1971) is a former Bulgarian professional footballer who played as a defender.

== Club career ==
Filipov began his career at the local "Sliven". His first spell at PFC CSKA Sofia spanned one season (1990–91), after which he moved to Lokomotiv GO, and then played a short time for Jeju United of South Korean K League, then known as Yukong Elephant and Bucheon SK, only to return to PFC CSKA Sofia for another year. He then spent some time playing in LEKS (Litex) before again returning to PFC CSKA Sofia for a third spell since December 1997.

== Coaching career ==
In 2007 became coach of the youth national team in 17 years, subsequently he was coach of FC Vihren Sandanski from November 2007 to September 2009, with some interruptions - especially memorable 2-1 victory over Litex in 2007/08gl. 1-0 against PFC Levski Sofia and Lokomotiv Sofia, 3-1 as the guest of PSFC Chernomorets Burgas 2008/09g season. Despite these victories the team finished in 14th place in the standings and was relegated to the "B" group. After a hesitant start in the Western "B" group in September Filipov was fired from FC Vihren Sandanski. A month later he became coach of Kaliakra Kavarna in the East "B" group, led the team to first place, which automatically qualified them in the "A" group. In the same season Kaliakra Kavarna reached the 1/2 finals of the Cup of Bulgaria, prevailing over Lokomotiv Plovdiv, PFC Marek Dupnitsa, PFC Cherno More Varna before being eliminated on penalties by PFC Chernomorets Pomorie. The first season of "A" group in the history of Kaliakra Kavarna began with a shock victory away to PFC Slavia Sofia 1-0, but after a few poor results Filipov was fired. In October 2011 he was invited by Dimitar Penev as assistant coach at the headquarters of CSKA Sofia.

== Honours ==
=== Player ===
- (Bulgaria) CSKA Sofia
- Bulgarian League Winner: 1

1996-97 A PFG

- Bulgarian League Runners-up: 2

1990-91 A PFG:: 1993-94 A PFG

- Bulgarian Cup Winner: 1

1996-97 Bulgarian Cup

- (South Korea) Jeju United FC
- League Cup Runners-up: 2

1998 Adidas Cup
1998 Philip Morris Korea Cup

=== Manager ===
- (Bulgaria) Kaliakra Kavarna
- Bulgarian Second League Winner: 1

2009–10 B PFG

- Bulgarian Cup Semifinalist: 1

2009–10 Bulgarian Cup
