= Kancho Yordanov =

Bulgarian footballer

Personal information
- Date of birth: 22 June 1965 (age 61)
- Place of birth: Kazanlak, Bulgaria
- Position: Forward

Senior career*
Years	Team	Apps	(Gls)
1984–1991	Rozova Dolina	124	(37)
1991–1993	Etar Veliko Tarnovo		(23)
1994–1995	Levski Sofia	38	(4)
1996	Karşıyaka	10	(0)
1996–1997	CSKA Sofia	13	(2)
- * Club domestic league appearances and goals

Kancho Yordanov (Bulgarian: Кънчо Йорданов; born 22 June 1965 in Kazanlak) is a former Bulgarian footballer who played as a forward. In his career he played for Rozova Dolina, Etar Veliko Tarnovo, Levski Sofia, CSKA Sofia and Turkish side Karşıyaka.

== Honours ==
=== Club ===
Levski Sofia

- A Group: 1994–95
- Bulgarian Cup: 1993–94

CSKA Sofia

- A Group: 1996–97
- Bulgarian Cup: 1996–97
