= Kiril Andonov =

Bulgarian footballer

Personal information
- Full name: Kiril Borisov Andonov
- Date of birth: 1 November 1967 (age 58)
- Place of birth: Plovdiv, Bulgaria
- Position: Defender

Senior career*
Years	Team	Apps	(Gls)
1985–1987	Maritsa Plovdiv		
1987–1990	Lokomotiv Plovdiv	71	(0)
1990–1991	Beroe Stara Zagora	15	(0)
1992–1996	Spartak Plovdiv		
1996–1997	Vanspor	25	(0)
1997–2002	Botev Plovdiv	91	(5)
- * Club domestic league appearances and goals

Kiril Andonov (Bulgarian: Кирил Андонов) (born 1 November 1967) is a retired Bulgarian football player.

Andonov played for Vanspor during the Turkish Super Lig 1996–97 season. He also played for PFC Botev Plovdiv.

Andonov played for Bulgaria at the 1987 FIFA World Youth Championship in Chile. Currently Andonov coach of FC Maritsa Plovdiv.
