= Anatoli Nankov =

Bulgarian footballer (born 1969)

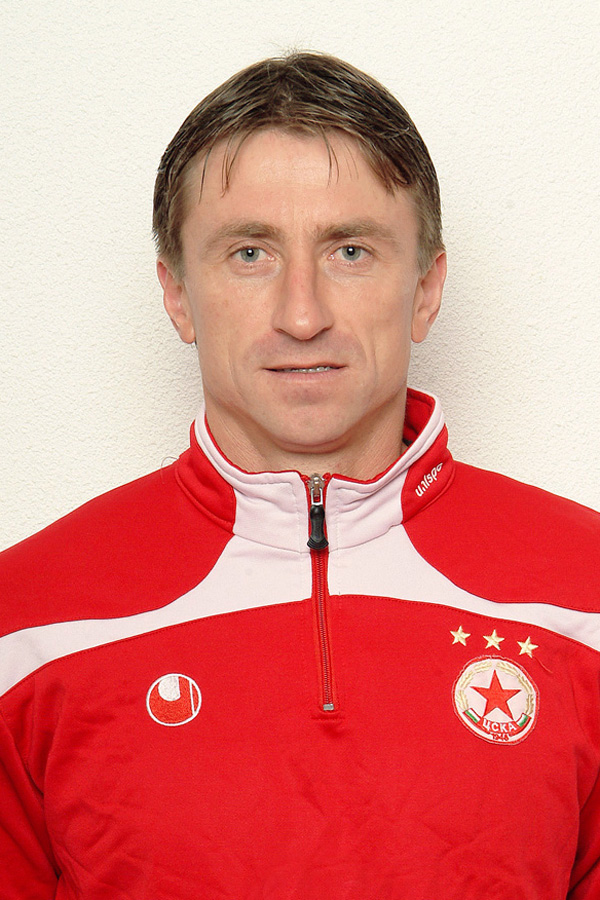

Personal information
- Full name: Anatoli Aleksandrov Nankov
- Date of birth: 15 July 1969 (age 57)
- Place of birth: Oresh, Bulgaria
- Height: 1.75 m (5 ft 9 in)
- Position: Midfielder

Youth career
- 1983–1985: Akademik Svishtov

Senior career*
Years	Team	Apps	(Gls)
1985–1988	Dunav Ruse	57	(19)
1988–1990	Slavia Sofia	34	(6)
1990–1997	CSKA Sofia	145	(23)
1994	→ Slavia Sofia (loan)	14	(4)
1997–2000	Lokomotiv Sofia	54	(6)
1998	→ CSKA Sofia (loan)	2	(0)
2000–2003	Spartak Varna	34	(5)
2002	→ Chengdu Blades (loan)	14	(6)
2003–2004	GKS Katowice	4	(0)
2004–2005	Minyor Bobov dol	2	(0)
Total		360	(59)

International career
1993–1998	Bulgaria	17	(0)

Managerial career
- 2005: Hebar Pazardzhik
- 2007–2008: CSKA Sofia (assistant)
- 2008–2009: Al-Ahli (assistant)
- 2009–2011: ENPPI Club (assistant)
- 2012–2015: CSKA Sofia (assistant)
- 2015: CSKA Sofia (interim)
- 2015: El Ittihad Alexandria (assistant)
- 2016: FC Atyrau (assistant)
- 2017–2020: FC Kaisar (assistant)
- 2021–2022: CSKA Sofia (assistant)
- 2023: Strumska Slava
- 2024: CSKA Sofia (assistant)
- 2024: Marek Dupnitsa
- 2024–2025: Dayrout
- 2025: Montana
- * Club domestic league appearances and goals

Anatoli Aleksandrov Nankov (Bulgarian: Анатоли Александров Нанков; born 15 July 1969) is a Bulgarian football manager and former professional football player. As a player, he played as a midfielder and represented several clubs in Bulgaria and abroad. He also played for the Bulgaria national team, representing the country at the 1998 FIFA World Cup.

After retiring as a player, Nankov moved into coaching and management, working as a coach and manager for clubs in Bulgaria and several other countries, as well as with the Bulgaria national team.

== Club career ==
Nankov began his professional career in 1985 with Dunav Ruse. After playing there until 1988, he moved to Slavia Sofia, where he remained until 1990.

In 1990, he transferred to CSKA Sofia, where he played until 1997. During this period, he established himself as one of the team's key midfielders. In 1994, he was loaned to his former club Slavia Sofia for one season before returning to CSKA Sofia. With CSKA Sofia, he won the Bulgarian top division titles in the 1991–92 and 1996–97 seasons, as well as the Bulgarian Cup in 1992–93 and 1996–97.

In 1997, Nankov moved to Lokomotiv Sofia. In 1998, he was loaned to CSKA Sofia, briefly returning to his former club, before returning to Lokomotiv Sofia, where he remained until 2000.

In 2000, he transferred to Spartak Varna. In 2002, he was loaned to Chengdu Blades of China, where he played abroad before returning to Spartak Varna. With Chengdu, he made 15 appearances and scored six goals in 2002.

In 2003, he moved to GKS Katowice in Poland, but left the club after one season. In 2004, he returned to Bulgaria and played for Minyor Bobov Dol, retiring from professional football in 2005. At Katowice, he made four appearances during the 2003–04 season, while he made two appearances for Minyor Bobov Dol in the 2004–05 season.

== International career ==
Nankov played for the Bulgaria national team from 1993 to 1998, making 17 international appearances. In 1998, he was selected for Bulgaria's squad for the 1998 FIFA World Cup.

Nankov made two appearances at the 1998 FIFA World Cup. He started Bulgaria's opening group-stage match against Paraguay and was sent off in the 87th minute after receiving a second yellow card. The match ended in a 0–0 draw. He also appeared in Bulgaria's group-stage match against Spain, but Bulgaria lost 1–6.

Bulgaria were eliminated in the group stage after recording one draw and two defeats. Nankov's international career ended with the 1998 FIFA World Cup, and he was primarily deployed as a midfielder for the Bulgaria national team.

== Honours ==
CSKA Sofia

- First Professional Football League: 1991–92, 1996–97
- Bulgarian Cup: 1992–93, 1996–97
