= Ivaylo Andonov =

Bulgarian footballer

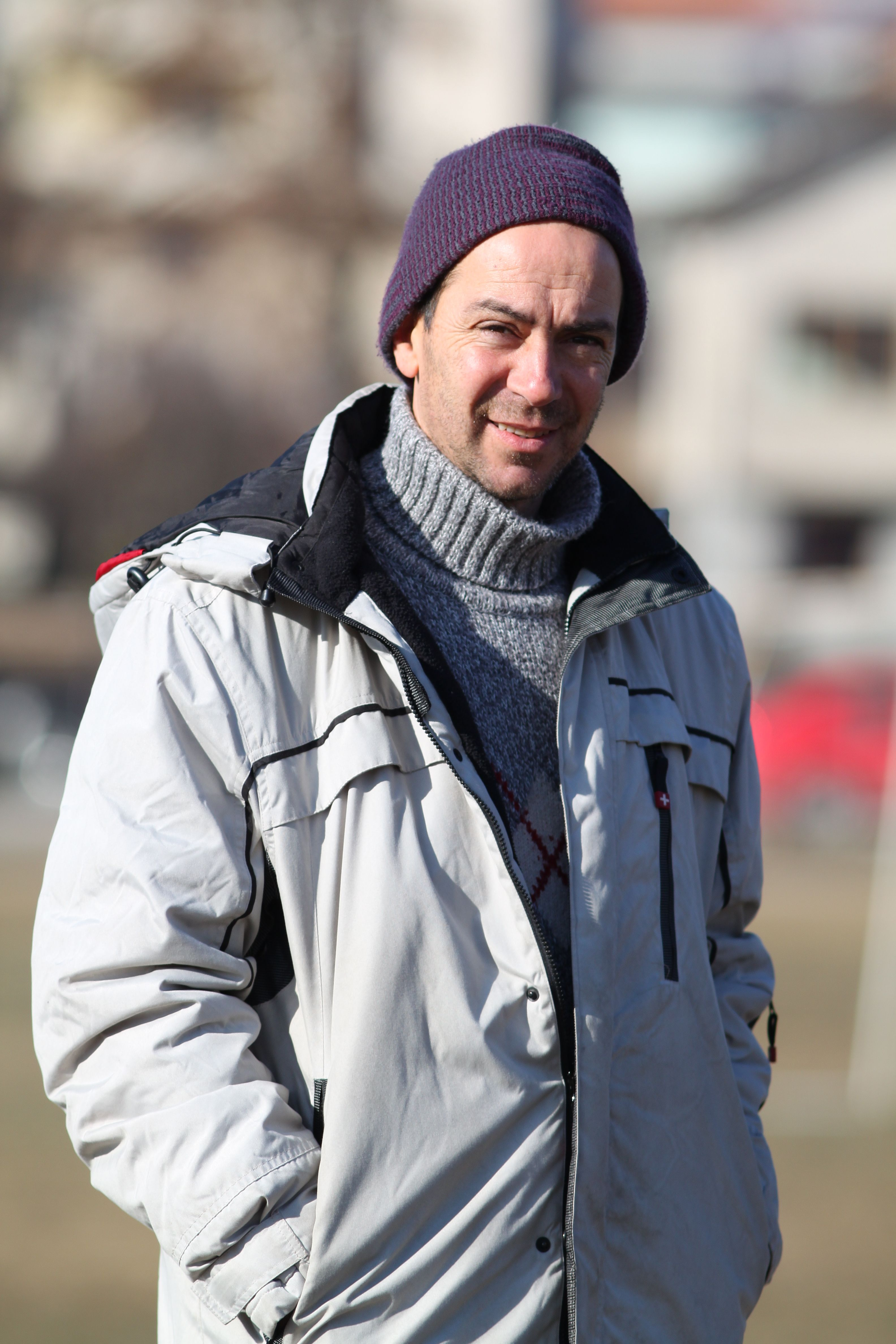

Personal information
- Full name: Ivaylo Viktorov Andonov
- Date of birth: 14 August 1967 (age 59)
- Place of birth: Blagoevgrad, Bulgaria
- Position: Forward

Senior career*
Years	Team	Apps	(Gls)
1987–1991	Pirin Blagoevgrad	95	(19)
1991–1994	CSKA Sofia	84	(55)
1994–1995	Albacete	24	(4)
1995–1996	Arminia Bielefeld	20	(2)
1996–1998	CSKA Sofia	53	(29)
1998–1999	Lokomotiv Sofia	24	(7)
1999–2000	Union Berlin	28	(7)
2000–2001	Pirin Blagoevgrad	26	(14)
Total		354	(137)

International career
1991–1997	Bulgaria	5	(0)
- * Club domestic league appearances and goals

Ivaylo Viktorov Andonov (Bulgarian: Ивайло Викторов Андонов; born 14 August 1967) is a Bulgarian former professional footballer who played as a forward.

== Football career ==
After beginning professionally with hometown's PFC Pirin Blagoevgrad, Andonov made a name for himself at PFC CSKA Sofia, constantly being one of the first division topscorers, while also being instrumental in the club's 1992 league conquest.

Between 1994 and 1996, he had two unassuming spells abroad, in Spain and Germany (the latter being in the 2. Bundesliga. Returning subsequently to CSKA, Andonov netted 18 times in only 25 matches, for another championship conquest. He retired in 2000 at the age of 33, after two seasons with neighbours PFC Lokomotiv Sofia and another spell in Germany, with lowly 1. FC Union Berlin.

Andonov gained five caps for Bulgaria and was picked for the squad at the 1994 FIFA World Cup, but did not leave the bench during the tournament in the United States as the national team finished in fourth position.

In 2001, he established his own children's academy near the village Pokrovnik.

== Honours ==
CSKA Sofia

- Bulgarian League: 1991–92, 1996–97
- Bulgarian Cup: 1992–93, 1996–97
