= Atanas Dzhambazki =

Bulgarian footballer and manager

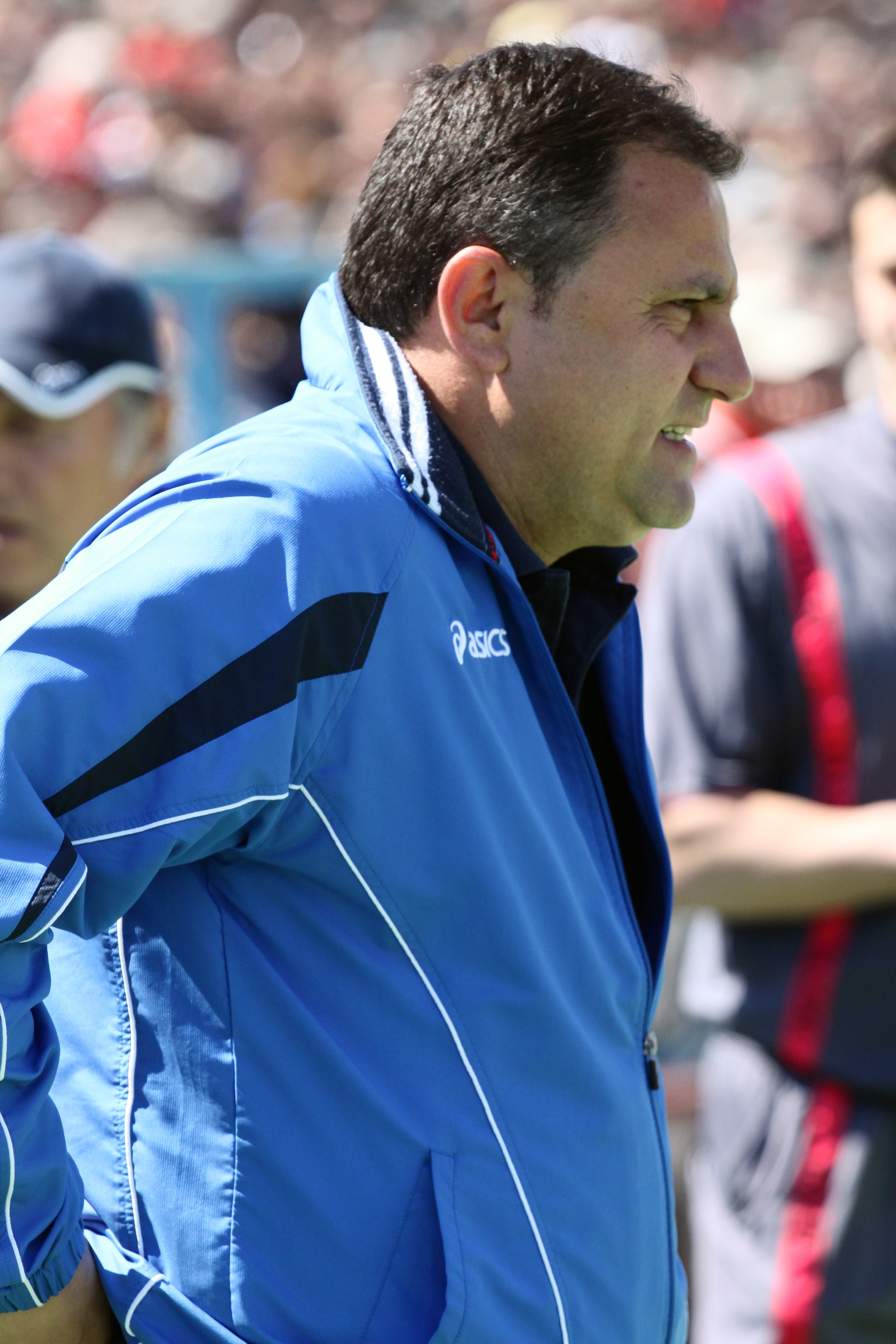

Personal information
- Full name: Atanas Tododrov Dzhambazki
- Date of birth: 4 July 1969 (age 57)
- Place of birth: Sofia, Bulgaria
- Position: Defender

Senior career*
Years	Team	Apps	(Gls)
- Lokomotiv Sofia
- Lyulin Sofia
- Olimpik Teteven

Managerial career
- 2001–2003: Slavia Sofia (Assistant)
- 2003: Slavia Sofia
- 2004–2005: Slavia Sofia
- 2007: Lokomotiv Stara Zagora
- 2007: Montana
- 2008: Sportist Svoge
- 2008: Spartak Varna
- 2009–2011: Montana
- 2011: Botev Vratsa
- 2011–2012: Litex Lovech
- 2012–2013: Montana
- 2015: Botev Vratsa
- 2016–2017: Montana
- 2017–2018: Kariana Erden
- * Club domestic league appearances and goals

Atanas Dzhambazki (Bulgarian: Атанас Джамбазки; born 4 April 1969) is a Bulgarian football manager and former player.

== Coaching career ==
In 2009 Dzhambazki became manager of Montana, after their former manager Stevica Kuzmanovski was released. He was in charge of the team for two years and managed to stabilize the team and ensure their place in A PFG which was a huge success for Montana. On 2 June 2011 he decided to leave the club, stating "I have other plans for my future". He spent a brief period as manager of Botev Vratsa and Litex. On 6 June 2012 he was appointed as head coach of Montana for the third time in his career. On 26 May 2015, Dzhambazki was confirmed as the new manager of Botev Vratsa. On 4 October 2016, Dzhambazki was appointed as interim manager of Montana. He resigned on 17 April 2017, following a 3–4 home defeat by Slavia Sofia. On 3 May 2017, he was appointed as manager of Third League club Kariana Erden.

In August 2018, Dzhambazki was banned for one year and fined 1,500 levs after an incident in a game against Strumska Slava in which he attacked the referee and his assistant.
