= FC Maritsa Plovdiv =

Bulgarian association football club

- Full name: Football Club Maritsa Plovdiv
- Founded: 1921; 105 years ago
- Ground: Maritsa Stadium, Plovdiv
- Capacity: 5,000
- Chairman: Hristo Hristov
- Manager: Nikolay Dimitrov
- League: Southeast Third League
- 2025–26: Southeast Third League, 2nd
| Home colours | Away colours |

Maritsa (Bulgarian: Марица) is a Bulgarian association football club based in Plovdiv, currently playing in the Third League, the third level of Bulgarian football league system.

It was established in 1921, after the merger of the teams Vampir and Trite Konski Sili. The club plays its home games at Maritsa Stadium, located in the city's northern district. The team's biggest success is playing in Bulgaria's top division four times, in 1967–68, 1969–70, 1970–71 and 1996–97. They have also reached the semifinals of the Bulgarian Cup once, in 1996–97.

The club is particularly famous for its renowned youth program that has produced many Bulgarian talents over the years – Hristo Stoichkov, Dinko Dermendzhiev, Aleksandar Aleksandrov. Bulgarian national first-team players Georgi Georgiev, Kostadin Vidolov, Krassimir Chomakov, Valeri Domovchiyski, Yordan Todorov, Asen Nikolov had also came through the ranks at Maritsa.

The team is named Maritsa after the river of the same name, which flows past Plovdiv.

== History ==
=== Early years ===
FC Maritsa was founded on 20 September 1921, after the Union of three smaller teams. The team, up until 1967, competed in either the second or third divisions of Bulgarian football, usually in the shadows of the much more popular and successful other teams from Plovdiv, namely Botev, Lokomotiv, and Spartak.

=== First Tastes of Top Football ===
1967 is arguably one of the most important years in the club's history, because that is when Maritsa managed to promote to the A Group for the first time ever. Maritsa's first season in the elite was largely unsuccessful. The team finished last (16th), with only 6 wins, 5 draws, and 19 losses. This earned them only 17 points, which was eight points below the safety zone, thus resulting in relegation after a single season.

Maritsa, however, did not have to wait long for their second season in the top level. This came just two seasons after their relegation, for season 1969–70. This time Maritsa managed to win 10 games and draw 3 times, earning them 23 points. This was enough for the team to ensure safety from relegation, as Minyor Pernik and Beroe were relegated instead. Maritsa's third season in the elite was less successful, however. The team finished last, with only 4 wins and a total of 17 losses, only earning them 17 points, ending in relegation once more. This ended Maritsa's two-year spell in the elite category.

=== Lower Leagues and Return Among the Best ===
Between 1971 and 1996, Maritsa bounced between the second and third tiers of Bulgarian football. This changed in 1996, when Maritsa promoted back to the A PFG after a 25-year absence from the top level of football. Their return proved to be difficult. Maritsa fought bravely against relegation, however that was not enough, as the team placed 14th, three points behind Etar, thus was relegated again. To date, this is the last appearance in the top level for Maritsa.

=== 2017–present: Return to professional football ===
In 2016–17 Third League season Maritsa Plovdiv finished second in their regional division, but gained promotion, because the first ranked team – FC Zagorets declined the offer to participate in the Second Professional League. On 16 June 2017 the club signed a contract with Botev Plovdiv for collaboration. Botev sent 5 players on loan and allowed Maritsa to play their home games on their training base, the Botev 1912 Football Complex, until Maritsa Stadium is altered for professional matches. Maritsa was, however, relegated back to the third tier after only one season in the second league.

In 2021, Maritsa again achieved promotion to the Second League, winning the 2020–21 Southeast Third League. Maritsa managed to secure a ninth-place finish in the 2021–22 season in the second tier.

=== Youth academy ===
The club is particularly famous for its renowned youth program that has produced many Bulgarian talents over the years – Hristo Stoichkov, Dinko Dermendzhiev, Aleksandar Aleksandrov. Bulgarian national first-team players Georgi Georgiev, Kostadin Vidolov, Krassimir Chomakov, Valeri Domovchiyski, Yordan Todorov, Asen Nikolov had also came through the ranks at Maritsa.

== Honours ==
=== Domestic ===
- First League:
  - Fourtheenth (2): 1969–70, 1996–97
- Bulgarian Cup:
  - Semifinals (1): 1996–97
- Second League:
  - Winners (1): 1995–96
- Third League:
  - Winners (1): 2020–21

== Past seasons ==
| Season | League | Place | W | D | L | GF | GA | Pts | Bulgarian Cup |
|---|---|---|---|---|---|---|---|---|---|
| 2012–13 | A Regional Group (IV) | 2 | 17 | 8 | 5 | 58 | 22 | 59 | not qualified |
| 2013–14 | A Regional Group | 1 | 15 | 7 | 6 | 55 | 31 | 52 | not qualified |
| 2014–15 | V Group (III) | 11 | 12 | 3 | 15 | 38 | 53 | 36 | not qualified |
| 2015–16 | V Group | 9 | 14 | 9 | 11 | 45 | 29 | 51 | not qualified |
| 2016–17 | Third League | 2 | 26 | 0 | 8 | 95 | 25 | 78 | not qualified |
| 2017–18 | Second League (II) | 14 | 9 | 6 | 15 | 34 | 45 | 33 | First round |
Green marks a season followed by promotion, red a season followed by relegation.

== Current squad ==
As of 27 June 2024

Note: Flags indicate national team as defined under FIFA eligibility rules; some limited exceptions apply. Players may hold more than one non-FIFA nationality.

| No. | Pos. | Nation | Player |
|---|---|---|---|
| 3 | DF | BUL | Hristo Tsvetkov |
| 4 | MF | BUL | Bozhidar Shehov |
| 5 | DF | BUL | Dimitar Avramov |
| 7 | MF | BUL | Svilen Shterev |
| 8 | MF | BUL | Samuil Sadakov |
| 9 | FW | BUL | Georgi Trifonov |
| 10 | MF | BUL | Veselin Marchev |
| 11 | MF | BUL | Oldzhay Aliev |
| 12 | MF | BUL | Iliyan Yordanov |
| 13 | MF | BUL | Milen Tanchev |
| 14 | MF | BUL | Emil Makaveev |
| 15 | MF | BUL | Hristian Dimitrov |
| 17 | FW | BUL | Valeri Domovchiyski (captain) |

| No. | Pos. | Nation | Player |
|---|---|---|---|
| 18 | MF | BUL | Angel Peev |
| 19 | MF | BUL | Martin Gaziev |
| 20 | DF | BUL | Teodor Andreev |
| 21 | MF | BUL | Stanislav Malamov |
| 26 | GK | BUL | Viktor Petkov |
| 28 | MF | BUL | Radoslav Apostolov |
| 29 | DF | BUL | Atanas Tasholov |
| 30 | MF | BUL | Nasko Hristev |
| 33 | GK | BUL | Petar Nachev |
| 77 | MF | BUL | Stefan Popov |
| 86 | GK | BUL | Iliya Nikolov |
| 90 | FW | BUL | Petar Atanasov |

For recent transfers, see Transfers summer 2023 and Transfers winter 2023–24.

== Personnel ==
=== Current technical body ===
| Position | Name | Nationality |
|---|---|---|
| Sports director | Kiril Andonov | (Bulgaria) |
| Head coach | Nikolay Dimitrov | (Bulgaria) |
| Assistant coach | Krasimir Ivanov | (Bulgaria) |
| Goalkeeper coach | Iliya Nikolov | (Bulgaria) |
| Analyzer | Stoycho Dramov | (Bulgaria) |
| Academy director | Vasil Krastev | (Bulgaria) |
| Rehabilitator | Nikolay Dyulgerov | (Bulgaria) |
| Administrator | Hristo Dyakov | (Bulgaria) |

== Notable players ==
Had international caps for their respective countries, held any club record, or have more than 100 league appearance. Players whose name is listed in bold represented their countries.

Bulgaria

- (Bulgaria) **Aleksandar Aleksandrov**
- (Bulgaria) Marin Bakalov
- (Bulgaria) **Krasimir Chomakov**
- (Bulgaria) **Dinko Dermendzhiev**
- (Bulgaria) **Valeri Domovchiyski**
- (Bulgaria) **Georgi Georgiev**
- (Bulgaria) Georgi Hristov
- (Bulgaria) **Yordan Hristov**
- (Bulgaria) Nikolay Kirov
- (Bulgaria) **Petar Kurdov**
- (Bulgaria) Stanislav Malamov
- (Bulgaria) **Dimitar Marashliev**
- (Bulgaria) Veselin Marchev
- (Bulgaria) Ivan Mekikov
- (Bulgaria) **Dimitar Mladenov**
- (Bulgaria) **Asen Nikolov**
- (Bulgaria) Iliya Nikolov
- (Bulgaria) **Dimitar Popov**
- (Bulgaria) **Zapryan Rakov**
- (Bulgaria) **Hristo Stoichkov**
- (Bulgaria) Georgi Trifonov
- (Bulgaria) **Yordan Todorov**
- (Bulgaria) **Kostadin Vidolov**

Europe

- (Armenia) **Armen Ambartsumyan**

Asia

- (Uzbekistan) **Aleksey Dionisiev**
