= Milen Petkov =

Bulgarian footballer

Personal information
- Full name: Milen Ivanov Petkov
- Date of birth: 12 January 1974 (age 52)
- Place of birth: General Toshevo, Bulgaria
- Height: 1.78 m (5 ft 10 in)
- Position: Midfielder

Senior career*
Years	Team	Apps	(Gls)
1991–1995	Dobrudzha	62	(8)
1995–2000	CSKA Sofia	122	(16)
2000–2005	AEK Athens	168	(20)
2005–2006	Atromitos	10	(0)
2006–2008	Ilisiakos	48	(3)
2008–2010	Cherno More	30	(0)
2011	Dobrudzha	6	(0)
Total		378	(35)

International career^{‡}
1995–2004	Bulgaria	41	(1)
- * Club domestic league appearances and goals as of 31 May 2010 ‡ National team caps and goals as of December 2005

Milen Petkov (Bulgarian: Милен Петков; born 12 January 1974) is a former Bulgarian international football player, who played as a midfielder.

== Club career ==
Petkov started his career in the Dobrudzha Dobrich and then played with great success in CSKA Sofia, where he won 1 Bulgarian League and 2 Bulgarian Cups. On 24 January 2000, he was transferred to the Greek side, AEK Athens for a fee of 260 million drachmas, at the request of the manager, Giannis Pathiakakis. He had a great impact for his team in winning the Greek Cup in 2000, scoring in the quarter-finals in the 3–0 win against Olympiacos, but also with a free kick in the final against Ionikos. The following seasons at the clun were also good where he played either as a starter or as a substitute. But affected by various injuries he his declining performances during his last seasons resulted in leaving AEK in the summer of 2005, having won 2 Greek Cups. Afterwards, he played for one season at Atromitos and then for two seasons in the second division side, Ilisiakos. In 2008 he returned to Bulgaria and played in Cherno More for two seasons before ending his career in Dobrudzha in 2011.

== International career ==
Petkov was part of the Bulgarian World Cup 1998 team and Bulgarian 2004 European Football Championship team, which was eliminated in the first round, finishing bottom of Group C, having finished top of Qualifying Group 8 in the pre-tournament phase. Between 1995 and 2004 for Bulgaria national football team he had 41 caps and scored 1 goal.

== After football ==
Petkov after the end of his career as a footballer, took up coaching and also worked as an agent.

== Personal life ==
Petkov's son, Aleks Petkov, is also a professional footballer.

== Statistics ==
=== International goals ===
#	Date	Venue	Opponent	Score	Result	Competition
1	2 June 2004	Letná Stadium, Prague, Czech Republic	Czech Republic	3–1	3–1	Friendly

== Honours ==
CSKA Sofia

- Bulgarian League: 1996–97
- Bulgarian Cup: 1996–97, 1998–99

AEK Athens

- Greek Cup: 1999–2000, 2001–02
