= Georgi Slavchev =

Bulgarian footballer

Personal information
- Full name: Georgi Slavchev Georgiev
- Date of birth: 1 October 1969 (age 57)
- Place of birth: Kyustendil, Bulgaria
- Height: 1.92 m (6 ft 3 1/2 in)
- Positions: Defender; midfielder

Senior career*
Years	Team	Apps	(Gls)
1986–1991	Levski Sofia	78	(8)
1991–1992	Deportivo Fabril		
1992–1995	Levski Sofia	43	(2)
1996–1999	St. Gallen	57	(7)
1997	→ CSKA Sofia (loan)	6	(0)
1999–2000	Velbazhd Kyustendil	6	(0)
2000–2001	Hebar Pazardzhik	7	(0)
2002	Brunei	8	(6)

International career
1993	Bulgaria	1	(0)
- * Club domestic league appearances and goals

Georgi Slavchev (Bulgarian: Георги Славчев; born 1 October 1969 in Kyustendil) is a Bulgarian former footballer who played as a midfielder.

== Honours ==
=== Club ===
Levski Sofia

- A Group (4): 1987–88, 1992–93, 1993–94, 1994–95
- Bulgarian Cup (2): 1990–91, 1993–94

CSKA Sofia

- A Group: 1996–97
- Bulgarian Cup: 1996–97

== Political career ==
In the 2003 Bulgarian local elections, Slavchev was elected for mayor of the village Dolni Pasarel. He served until 2007.
