= Valentin Stanchev =

Bulgarian footballer

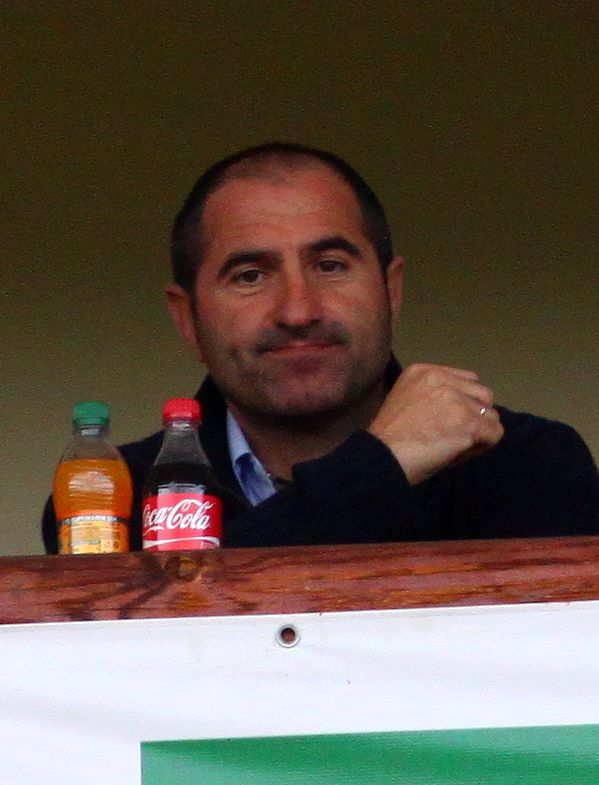

Personal information
- Full name: Valentin Ivanov Stanchev
- Date of birth: 25 October 1968 (age 57)
- Place of birth: Vratsa, Bulgaria
- Position: Striker

Senior career*
Years	Team	Apps	(Gls)
1986–1992	Botev Vratsa	103	(34)
1992–1994	Chernomorets Burgas	55	(15)
1994–1999	Spartak Varna	101	(39)
1997	→ Shenhua (loan)	28	(23)
1998–1999	→ CSKA Sofia (loan)	23	(7)
1999–2000	Sachsen Leipzig	29	(6)
2000–2003	Spartak Varna	76	(25)
2004–2005	Cherno More	23	(6)
Total		440	(155)

International career
1999	Bulgaria	1	(0)
- * Club domestic league appearances and goals

Valentin Stanchev (Bulgarian: Валентин Станчев; born 25 October 1968) is a former Bulgarian footballer who played as a striker.

== Career ==
Born in Vratsa, Valentin Stanchev played in his career for Botev Vratsa, Chernomorets Burgas, Spartak Varna, Shanghai Shenhua, CSKA Sofia, Sachsen Leipzig and Cherno More Varna.

On 26 May 1999, Stanchev scored for the 1–0 win for CSKA in the final of Bulgarian Cup against Litex Lovech.

He coached Emil Kuzmanov in his later days.

== Honours ==
=== As a player ===
Shanghai Shenhua

- Chinese Jia-A League
  - Runner-up (1): 1996–97

CSKA Sofia

- Bulgarian Cup
  - Winner (1): 1998–99
