= Petar Zhabov =

Bulgarian footballer

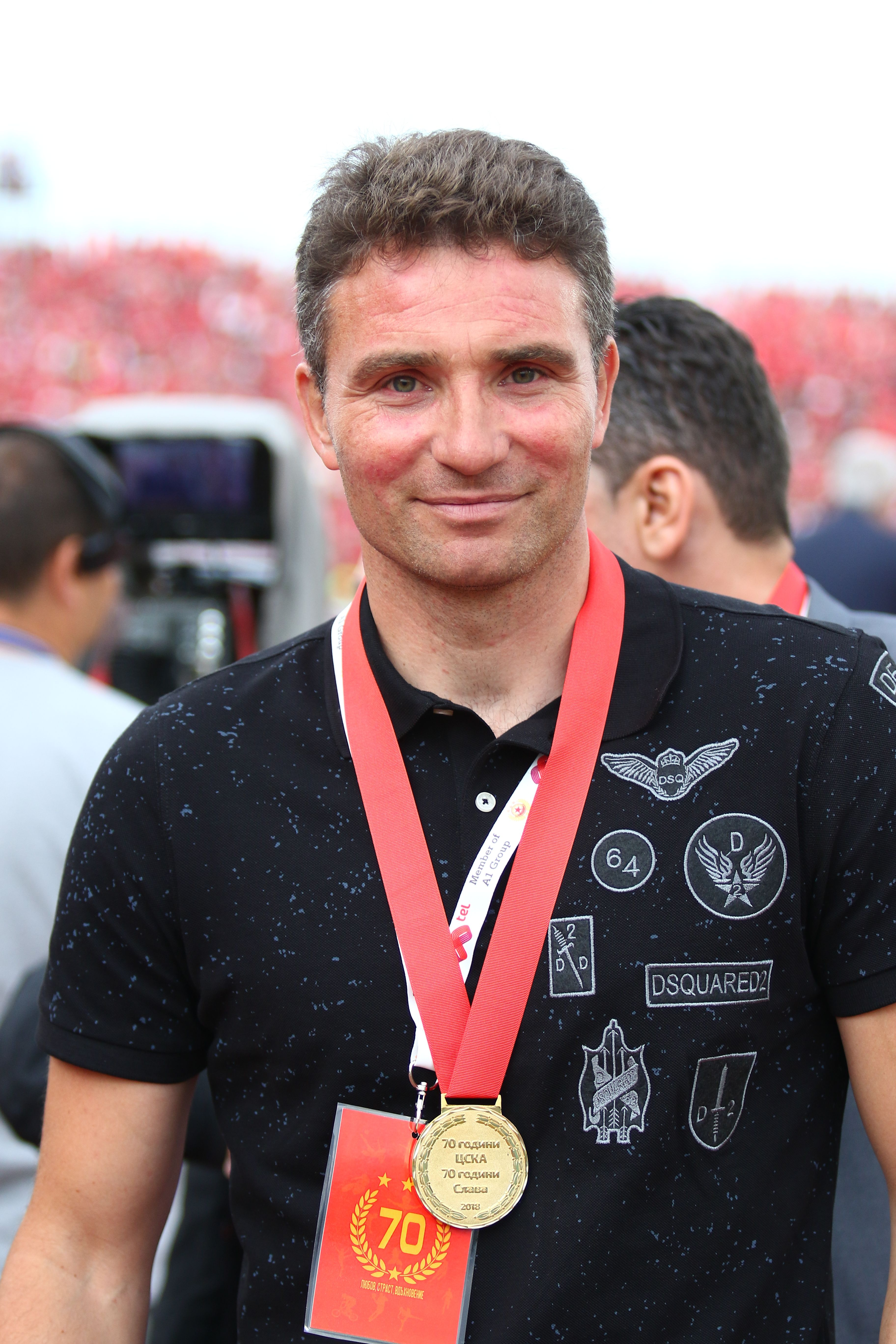

Personal information
- Full name: Petar Dimitrov Zhabov
- Date of birth: 7 December 1973 (age 52)
- Place of birth: Burgas, Bulgaria
- Height: 1.82 m (6 ft 0 in)
- Position: Forward

Youth career
- 1982–1990: Chernomorets Burgas

Senior career*
Years	Team	Apps	(Gls)
1990–1995	Chernomorets Burgas	110	(12)
1995–1998	CSKA Sofia	85	(25)
1998–2001	Cosenza	39	(5)
2001	→ Lucchese (loan)	25	(9)
2001–2002	Cesena	12	(2)
2002–2003	Pistoiese	13	(1)
2003	Taranto	7	(2)
2003–2004	Nardò	22	(6)
2004–2005	Lecco	9	(1)
Total		322	(63)

International career
1995–1998	Bulgaria U21	3	(1)
- * Club domestic league appearances and goals

Petar Zhabov (Bulgarian: Петър Жабов), born 7 December 1973) is a Bulgarian former footballer who played as a forward, spending his career in Bulgaria and Italy.. He captained of the Bulgaria under-21 national team.

== Career ==
With CSKA Sofia, Zhabov was instrumental in winning both the title and cup in 1997. He was subsequently purchased by Cosenza and remained in Italy until the end of his career.

In 2005, he returned to his hometown of Primorsko, where he opened a hotel and became involved in youth soccer programs.
