= Stanimir Gospodinov =

Bulgarian footballer

Personal information
- Full name: Stanimir Ivanov Gospodinov
- Date of birth: 3 March 1975 (age 51)
- Place of birth: Sliven, Bulgaria
- Height: 1.76 m (5 ft 9 1/2 in)
- Position: Defender

Youth career
- Sliven 2000

Senior career*
Years	Team	Apps	(Gls)
1994–1996	Sliven	?	(?)
1996–1998	Levski Sofia	49	(1)
1999	CSKA Sofia	10	(0)
1999–2004	Slavia Sofia	85	(1)
2004–2005	NK Mura	26	(2)
2005–2007	Vihren Sandanski	29	(0)
2007–2008	Daugava	22	(0)
2009	Minyor Pernik	7	(0)
2009–2010	Lokomotiv Mezdra	20	(0)
2010–2011	Botev Krivodol	15	(1)
2011–2012	Botev Kozloduy	?	(?)
2012–2013	Tundzha Yambol	?	(?)
- * Club domestic league appearances and goals

Stanimir Gospodinov (Bulgarian: Станимир Господинов; born 3 March 1975) is a Bulgarian former professional footballer who played as a defender.

== Career ==
Gospodinov started his career in his hometown Sliven. At 21 years old he went into the Bulgarian grand Levski Sofia. For two years in Levski he played in 43 caps and scored 1 goal.

He then played for CSKA Sofia, Slavia Sofia, Slovenian NK Mura, Vihren Sandanski and Daugava Daugavpils.

In January 2009 Gospodinov returned to Bulgaria, signing a contract with Minyor Pernik. Some six months later he transferred to Lokomotiv Mezdra.
