= FC Lyulin =

- Full name: Футболен клуб Люлин София (Football club Lyulin Sofia)
- Founded: 1985; 40 years ago
- Ground: Lyulin II, Sofia
- Capacity: 600
- League: A OFG
- 2012/2013: A OFG, 9th
Home colours	Away colours

FC Lyulin (Bulgarian: ФК Люлин) is a Bulgarian football club from Sofia, based in the capital's biggest residential area Lyulin, currently playing in the Sofia A OFG, the fourth division of Bulgarian football. The team is known for its loyal fans.

== Current squad ==
Note: Flags indicate national team as defined under FIFA eligibility rules; some limited exceptions apply. Players may hold more than one non-FIFA nationality.

No.	Pos.	Nation	Player
1	GK	(Bulgaria) BUL	Ruslan Stefanov
2	DF	(Bulgaria) BUL	Vladimir Miloslov
3	DF	(Bulgaria) BUL	Simeon Iliev
4	MF	(Nigeria) NGA	Frago Ikenna
5	MF	(Bulgaria) BUL	Nikolai Gigov (captain)
6	MF	(Bulgaria) BUL	Ivan Georgiev
7	MF	(Bulgaria) BUL	Tomi Aleksiev
8	MF	(Bulgaria) BUL	Georgi Petrov
9	FW	(Bulgaria) BUL	Filip Angelov
10	FW	(Bulgaria) BUL	Angel Grigorov
22	FW	(Bulgaria) BUL	Ficho Fichev
