= Stefan Lulchev =

Bulgarian footballer

Personal information
- Full name: Stefan Hristov Lulchev
- Date of birth: 27 April 1971
- Place of birth: Plovdiv, Bulgaria
- Date of death: 22 May 2017 (aged 43)
- Height: 1.88 m (6 ft 2 in)
- Position: Defender

Youth career
- Lokomotiv Plovdiv

Senior career*
Years	Team	Apps	(Gls)
1989–1993	Lokomotiv Plovdiv	40	(2)
1993	Chernomorets Burgas		
1994	Rozova Dolina		
1994–1995	Lokomotiv Plovdiv	32	(2)
1996–1999	CSKA Sofia	51	(0)
2000	Septemvri Sofia		
2000–2002	Marek Dupnitsa		
2003	Botev Plovdiv	4	(0)
- * Club domestic league appearances and goals

Stefan Hristov Lulchev (Bulgarian: Стефан Лулчев; 27 April 1971-22 May 2017) was a Bulgarian footballer who played as a defender. On 22 May 2017 he committed suicide by hanging himself.

== Club career ==
A product of the Loko Plovdiv youth system, Lulchev spent his entire career in his country, mainly playing for top division clubs. He became champion of Bulgaria with CSKA Sofia in 1997 and also won a Bulgarian Cup (1999). He was in addition to that part of the Loko Plovdiv and CSKA Sofia teams that posted third-place finishes in the league (in 1992 and 1998 respectively).

== Honours ==
CSKA Sofia

- A Group: 1996–97
- Bulgarian Cup: 1999
