= Risto Milosavov =

Macedonian footballer

Personal information
- Full name: Risto Milosavov; Ристо Милосавов
- Date of birth: 9 March 1965 (age 61)
- Place of birth: Štip, SR Macedonia, SFRY
- Position: Defender

Senior career*
Years	Team	Apps	(Gls)
1987–1992	Bregalnica Štip		
1992–1993	Balkan Skopje		
1993–1994	Bregalnica Štip		
1994–1995	Osogovo		
1995	Dobrudzha Dobrich	13	(4)
1996–1997	CSKA Sofia	40	(5)
1998	Dobrudzha Dobrich	13	(2)
1998	Apollon Kalamarias		
1999	Osogovo		
2000	Sasa	0	(0)
2000–2002	Kumanovo		

International career
1996–1997	Macedonia	8	(0)
- * Club domestic league appearances and goals

Risto Milosavov (Macedonian: Ристо Милосавов; born 9 March 1965) is a North Macedonia former professional footballer who played as a defender.

== International career ==
He made his senior debut for Macedonia in a March 1996 friendly match against Malta in Prilep and has earned a total of 8 caps. His final international was a September 1997 FIFA World Cup qualification match against Lithuania.

== External sources ==
- Risto Milosavov at National-Football-Teams.com
- CSKA SOFIA 1995/96
- CSKA SOFIA 1996/97
- CSKA SOFIA 1997/98
