= PFC Montana =

Association football club

Montana
- Full name: Professional Football Club Montana
- Nickname: Славата (The Glory)
- Founded: 20 March 1921; 105 years ago as SC Hristo Mihaylov
- Ground: Stadion Ogosta
- Capacity: 8,000
- Owner: Montana Municipality
- Chairman: Rumen Panayotov
- Head coach: Božidar Đurković
- League: Second League
- 2025–26: First League, 16th of 16 (relegated)
- Website: pfcmontana.bg
Home colours	Away colours	Third colours

Professional Football Club Montana (Bulgarian: ПФК Монтана) is a Bulgarian professional football club based in Montana, which currently plays in the Second League, the second level of the Bulgarian football league system.

Montana plays its home matches at the Ogosta Stadium, which has a capacity of 8,000 spectators. The club's traditional colours are blue, white and red. After a prolonged period of absence, they were propelled back into professional football in the mid-1990s with the help of some experienced and talented footballers, including the ex-captain of Bulgarian international Stiliyan Petrov.

PFC Montana was founded in 1921 when the few amateur sports clubs and organizations in the city decided to merge into one club. The new club was named SC Hristo Mihaylov after the Bulgarian communist party activist Hristo Popmihaylov, who was born in the town. Since then, Montana have spent a total of ten seasons in the Bulgarian First League and 43 seasons in the lower Second League. They have also reached the Bulgarian Cup final once, in 2016.

== Honours ==
- Second League:
  - Winners (2): 2008–09, 2014–15

== History ==
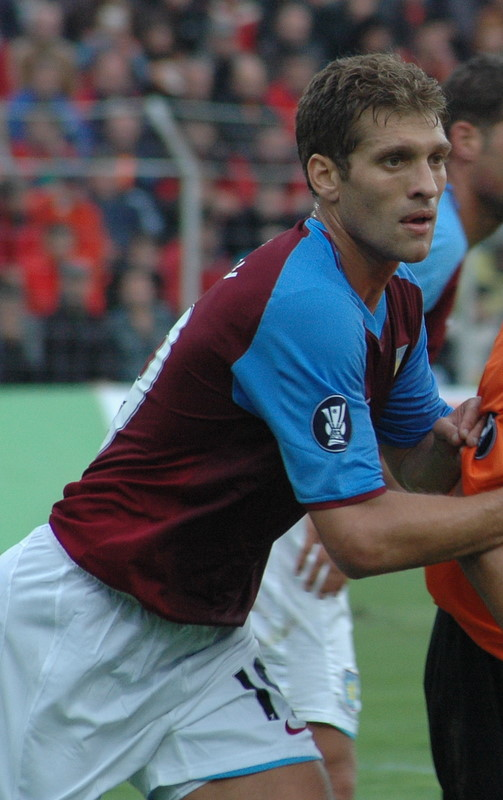
Stiliyan Petrov was raised in Montana's youth academy

=== Early years (1921–1957) ===
Teams that predate what became PFC Montana were founded in 1921 and onward. After the fall to communist rule, in 1947, the different clubs were merged under the name SC Hristo Mihaylov. Until 1946, the most popular team was Botev 22. After 1944, many reforms in the club occurred. On 10 February 1946, Botev 22, along with Yunak and Spartak formed Physical Culture Company YBS 45 (Yunak-Botev-Spartak 45). On 20 March 1947, YBC 45 was united with Workers Physical Culture Company Avram Stoyanov, the turist branch Pustrina and the local horse-riding and moto-organisation, under the name of Hristo Mihaylov. During the autumn of 1949, many changes took place. The city began to form voluntary sports organizations on a departmental basis, the most famous of which is Septemvri, which from 1953 played their first three seasons in the B Group. In 1957 they merged into SFS Septemvriyska Slava.

=== Settle in the professional football (1958–1992) ===
From 1957 to 1990 the sports club bore the name of Septemvriyska Slava. Montana gained a promotion for the second time in the B Group in 1962, after which they finished in third position, which remained their best ranking for the 1960s and 1980s, during which they almost always finished in the middle of the table. Since 1990, the club has used the name PFC Montana 1921.

=== Becoming a Bulgarian top team (1993–1998) ===
During the 1994–1995 season the team reached the Bulgarian first division A group for the first time, where they finished in 13th place and remained in the division for three consecutive years. Montana reached the semi-final of the Bulgarian Cup. Montana's best season in the A PFG was in the 1995–1996 season, in which they took 9th place. In this campaign, the team was led by Anatoli Tonov, Todor Pramatarov, Rumen Panayotov and Angel Chervenkov. The club reached the final of the currently folded Bulgarian League Cup tournament, but was knocked out by Neftochimic Burgas. Stiliyan Petrov was a key player for the team and was spotted by CSKA Sofia and sold in 1996, aged 17 years old. He enjoyed a successful stay there and was eventually bought by Celtic FC in 1999. Montana had to get a percent of the transfer, but the money never went to the club's cash register. In the 1996–1997 season, Montana finished in 15th place and was relegated to the second division. They defeated the champions CSKA Sofia 3–1 in the last match. Otherwise, according to the fans, Boyan Gergov is Montana's most prominent figure, being the club's top goalscorer with a total of 157 goals in 364 matches. The following 1997–1998 season, after a financial collapse, Montana was relegated to the Bulgarian V AFG.

=== Return to the top flight (2004–2011) ===
After a seven-year stay in the V AFG, the club finished in second position in the North-West V AFG, and Montana returned to the West B PFG for the 2004–2005 season. In 2008, the chairman of PFC Montana appointed Ivan Marinov as manager. The following year, with the financial support of mayor Zlatko Zhivkov, the club finished the season in the West B PFG in the first place and therefore gained promotion to the top flight for the upcoming season. The same year, Montana's striker Ventsislav Ivanov became the top goalscorer of the division with 19 goals.

In the 2009–2010 season in the then "A" football group, Montana finished 11th and remained in the league for four consecutive seasons, before being relegated to the lower division in 15th place. They remained in the "B" group for two seasons before finishing first and being promoted to the first division.

=== First Bulgarian Cup Final, 100th anniversary (2015–) ===
Montana started the new 2015–2016 season with a 0–0 draw as guest to a strong-sided Beroe, then defeating Botev Plovdiv 6–0, with Ivan Minchev scoring a hattrick. The good matches continued as Montana finished 1–1 with the champion Ludogorets Razgrad. The same season Montana would go all the way to the Bulgarian Cup final, before losing 1–0 to CSKA Sofia in a match with above 33,300 attendance. However, Montana would later finish ninth in the "A" group and successfully defend its place in the relegation playoffs for the next season in the renamed First League. The season did not go well for Montana as they finished 13th and lost the relegation playoff against Septemvri Sofia in a close 2–1 match. In the 2018–2019 season Montana finished second and once again played in a promotion playoff against FC Vitosha Bistritsa, in which they lost 3–0.

However, in the next season, after three years of waiting for promotion, Montana finished third in the 2019–2020 season in the second tier, qualifying for playoffs. On 17 July, Montana defeated Dunav Ruse 4–1, and was promoted to the First League after three years in the Second League. Montana could not defy the odds, however, and was relegated after a single season in the elite.

In 2025, Montana managed to finish in second place in the 2024–25 Second League season, achieving promotion to the First League after a four-year absence.

== Past seasons ==
=== Recent seasons ===
Season	Lvl	Place	W	D	L	GF	GA	Pts	Bulgarian Cup
2009–10	A Group (I)	11	9	9	12	30	37	36	Second round
2010–11	A Group	10	8	8	14	30	46	32	Second round
2011–12	A Group	11	8	7	15	29	51	31	Second round
2012–13	A Group	15	4	4	22	27	57	16	Second round
2013–14	B Group (II)	4	12	8	6	36	24	44	Second round
2014–15	B Group	1	25	3	2	72	16	78	Second round
2015–16	A Group (I)	9	4	9	19	23	42	21	Runners-up
2016–17	First League (I)	13	5	4	26	29	66	19	Round of 16
2017–18	Second League (II)	4	17	5	8	50	20	56	Round of 16
2018–19	Second League	2	18	9	4	49	25	63	Round of 32
2019–20	Second League	3	13	3	5	40	17	42	Round of 32
Green marks a season followed by promotion, red a season followed by relegation.

=== League positions ===
- 11 seasons in A Group
- 47 seasons in B Group

== Stadium ==
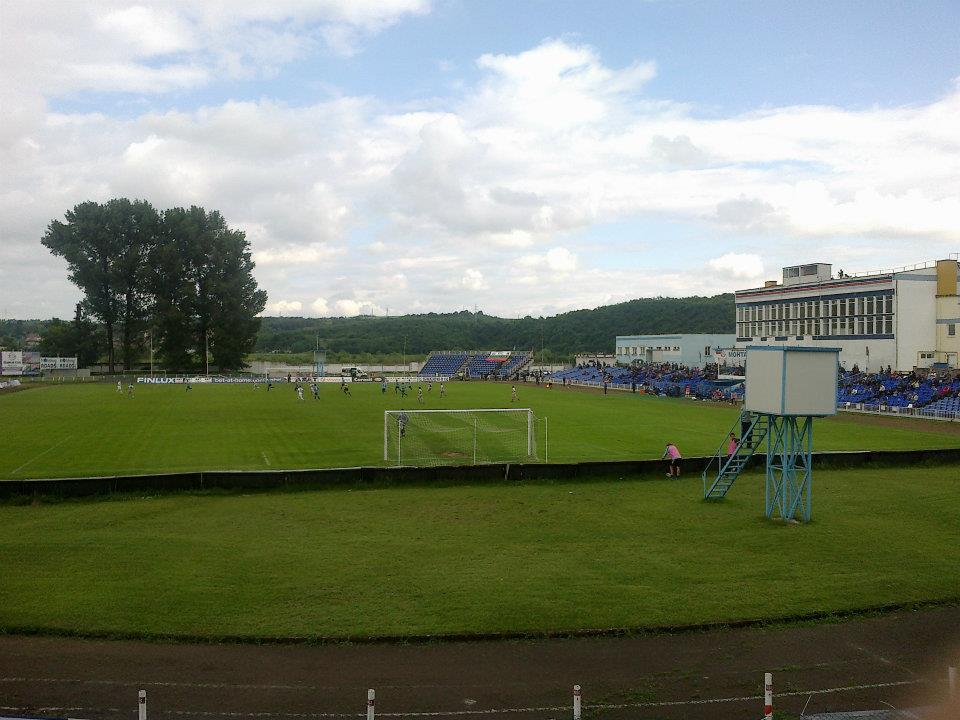
A view from the away ultras sector, taken in 2012

FC Montana's home ground is the Ogosta Stadium in Montana. The stadium was built in 1965, but the ground underwent a total reconstruction after 41 years, in 2006. It has approximately 8,000 seats, spread in two opposite stands, with pitch dimensions of 105×68 metres. Record attendance at the stadium is 11,500 spectators, achieved at a game between CSKA Sofia and Montana. The stadium's name is derived from the river Ogosta, which passes through the town.

== Supporters and rivalries ==
One of the club's ultras group is known as Ogosta Boys.

Montana's rival is the neighbouring city club of Botev Vratsa, and both form the local Northwestern Derby.

== Players ==
=== Current squad ===
As of 9 July 2026

Note: Flags indicate national team as defined under FIFA eligibility rules; some limited exceptions apply. Players may hold more than one non-FIFA nationality.

No.	Pos.	Nation	Player
1	GK	CPV	Márcio Rosa
3	MF	BUL	Hristo Ivanov
4	DF	SRB	Dejan Kuzmanović
5	DF	BUL	Dimitar Avramov
6	MF	BUL	Kristiyan Valkov
7	MF	BUL	Martin Milushev
8	DF	BUL	Petar Atanasov
10	MF	BUL	Stefan Kamenov
11	FW	BUL	Oldzhay Aliev
12	GK	BUL	Yulian Veskov
13	DF	BUL	Vladi Laskov
14	FW	BEN	Steve Traoré

No.	Pos.	Nation	Player
17	MF	BUL	Petar Todorov
18	DF	BUL	Mario Balakov
19	FW	BUL	Vladislav Tsekov
20	MF	BUL	Georgi Karakashev
22	MF	NGR	Ibrahim Muhammad
23	FW	BUL	Hasan Strandzhev
25	MF	BUL	Velislav Vasilev
26	MF	BUL	Radoslav Slavchev
27	DF	NGR	Matthew Kingsley
30	GK	BUL	Vasil Simeonov
—	DF	BUL	Dzhan Hasan
—	MF	BUL	Ivelin Georgiev

For recent transfers, see Transfers winter 2025–26 and Transfers summer 2026.

=== Out on loan ===
Note: Flags indicate national team as defined under FIFA eligibility rules; some limited exceptions apply. Players may hold more than one non-FIFA nationality.

No.	Pos.	Nation	Player

=== Foreign players ===
Up to five non-EU nationals can be registered and given a squad number for the first team in the Bulgarian First League; however, only three can be used during a match day. Those non-EU nationals with European ancestry can claim citizenship from the nation their ancestors came from. If a player does not have European ancestry he can claim Bulgarian citizenship after playing in Bulgaria for five years.

EU Nationals

- (Portugal) Tomás Azevedo

EU Nationals (Dual citizenship)

- (Benin) (France) Steve Traoré
- (Cape Verde) (Portugal) Márcio Rosa
- (Serbia) (France) Dejan Kuzmanovic

Non-EU Nationals

- (Nigeria) Ibrahim Muhammad
- (Nigeria) Matthew Kingsley

== Notable players ==
Had international caps for their respective countries, held any club record, or had more than 100 league appearances. Players whose name is listed in bold represented their countries.

Bulgaria

- (Bulgaria) **Georgi Angelov**
- (Bulgaria) Miroslav Antonov
- (Bulgaria) Vladimir Aytov
- (Bulgaria) Dimitar Burov
- (Bulgaria) **Angel Chervenkov**
- (Bulgaria) **Kristian Dimitrov**
- (Bulgaria) **Radoslav Dimitrov**
- (Bulgaria) **Nikolay Domakinov**
- (Bulgaria) **Daniel Gadzhev**
- (Bulgaria) **Stanislav Genchev**
- (Bulgaria) Sergey Georgiev
- (Bulgaria) **Mihail Gyonin**
- (Bulgaria) **Ventsislav Hristov**
- (Bulgaria) **Atanas Iliev**
- (Bulgaria) Dimitar Iliev
- (Bulgaria) **Dimitar Iliev**
- (Bulgaria) **Hristo Ivanov**
- (Bulgaria) **Zdravko Lazarov**
- (Brazil) (Bulgaria) **Marquinhos**
- (Bulgaria) Vladimir Michev
- (Bulgaria) Ivan Mihov
- (Bulgaria) **Ivan Minchev**
- (Bulgaria) **Daniel Mladenov**
- (Bulgaria) **Stefan Naydenov**
- (Bulgaria) **Georgi Pashov**
- (Bulgaria) **Stiliyan Petrov**
- (Bulgaria) **Strahil Popov**
- (Bulgaria) **Ivan Stoyanov**
- (Bulgaria) Toni Tasev
- (Bulgaria) **Yordan Todorov**
- (Bulgaria) Yordan Todorov - Paro
- (Bulgaria) **Stefan Tsonkov**
- (Bulgaria) **Georgi Vladimirov**
- (Bulgaria) **Kostadin Yanchev**
- (Bulgaria) Yordan Yordanov

Europe

- (Albania) **Albi Dosti**
- (Montenegro) **Blažo Igumanović**
- (Slovenia) **Matej Poplatnik**

Asia

- (Lebanon) **Samir Ayass**

Africa

- (Benin) **David Kiki**
- (Niger) **Olivier Bonnes**
- (Cape Verde) **Márcio Rosa**

America

- (Brazil) Luiz Eduardo
- (Curaçao) **Liandro Martis**
- (Montserrat) **Corrin Brooks-Meade**

== Club officials ==
=== Board of directors ===
Position	Name	Nationality
President	Rumen Panayotov	(Bulgaria)
Administrative Director	Pantaley Zakov	(Bulgaria)

=== Current technical body ===
Position	Name	Nationality
Sporting director	Atanas Dzhambazki	(Bulgaria)
Director of Football	Mihail Madanski	(Bulgaria)
Head coach	Anatoli Nankov	(Bulgaria)
Assistant coach	Svetlan Kondev	(Bulgaria)
Goalkeeping Coach	Hristo Stamenov	(Bulgaria)
Physiotherapist	Petko Petkov	(Bulgaria)
Physiotherapist	Veselin Zahariev	(Bulgaria)
Housekeeper	Ivo Aleksandrov	(Bulgaria)
Driver	Ventsi Borisov	(Bulgaria)

== Former managers ==
- (Bulgaria) Atanas Dzhambazki (2007)
- (Bulgaria) Rumen Stoyanov (July 2007 – September 7)
- (North Macedonia) Stevica Kuzmanovski (July 2009 – December 9)
- (Bulgaria) Atanas Dzhambazki (January 2010 – June 11)
- (Bulgaria) Ivan Marinov
- (Bulgaria) Stefan Grozdanov (July 2011 – December 11)
- (Bulgaria) Atanas Atanasov (December 2011 – ??)
- (Bulgaria) Atanas Dzhambazki (July 2012 – ??)
- (Bulgaria) Stoycho Stoev (February 2013 – April 2013)
- (Bulgaria) Georgi Stankov
- (Bulgaria) Atanas Dzhambazki (June 2013 – December 2013)
- (Bulgaria) Nikolay Mitov (December 2013 – May 2014)
- (Bulgaria) Ferario Spasov (May 2014 – November 2015)
- (Bulgaria) Emil Velev (November 2015 – May 2016)
- (North Macedonia) Stevica Kuzmanovski (June 2016 – October 2016)
- (Bulgaria) Atanas Dzhambazki (October 2016 – April 2017)
- (Bulgaria) Atanas Atanasov (April 2017 – June 2017)
- (Bulgaria) Yavor Valchinov (June 2017 – Aug 2017)
- (Bulgaria) Ferario Spasov (Aug 2017 – March 2019)
- (Bulgaria) Stefan Genov (March 2019 – April 2019)
- (Bulgaria) Atanas Atanasov (April 2019 – June 2019)
- (Bulgaria) Nikola Spasov (April 2020 – November 2020)
- (Bulgaria) Atanas Atanasov (December 2020 – May 2021)
- (Bulgaria) Svetlan Kondev (May 2021 – December 2021)
- (Bulgaria) Antoni Zdravkov (December 2021 – September 2022)
- (Bulgaria) Ferario Spasov (September 2022 – February 2023)
- (Bulgaria) Angel Stoykov (March 2023 – 2024)
- (Bulgaria) Tancho Kalpakov (June 2024 – August 2025)
- (Bulgaria) Anatoli Nankov (August 2025 – )
