= Dimitar Ivanov (footballer, born 1970) =

Bulgarian footballer and manager

Personal information
- Full name: Dimitar Vladev Ivanov
- Date of birth: 7 October 1970 (age 56)
- Place of birth: Elhovo, Bulgaria
- Height: 1.78 m (5 ft 10 in)
- Position: Forward

Team information
- Current team: Tundzha Yagoda (manager)

Senior career*
Years	Team	Apps	(Gls)
1988–1990	Elhovo	?	(?)
1990–1991	Chirpan	?	(?)
1991–1992	Rozova Dolina	?	(?)
1992–1996	Chirpan	?	(?)
1996–1997	CSKA Sofia	24	(4)
1998	Bucheon SK	3	(0)
1999	Qingdao ?	?	(?)
1999–2000	CSKA Sofia	27	(14)
2002–2003	Botev Plovdiv	?	(?)
2004–2006	Elhovo	?	(?)

International career
	Bulgaria	1	(0)

Managerial career
- 2002–2003: Botev Plovdiv (assistant)
- 2004–2006: Elhovo (coach)
- 2008: Vihren (assistant)
- 2008–2009: Metalik Sopot
- 2009–2010: Sliven 2000 (youth team coach)
- 2010–2013: Tundzha Yambol
- 2017–: Tundzha Yagoda
- * Club domestic league appearances and goals

Dimitar Vladev Ivanov (Bulgarian: Димитър Владев Иванов) (born 7 October 1970) is a former Bulgarian footballer and currently manager.

== Career ==
Ivanov spent the majority of his career in Bulgaria, most notably having two spells with Bulgarian powerhouse CSKA Sofia. He is perhaps best known for scoring the fastest ever goal in The Eternal Derby, netting after 36 seconds in the 30 October 1999 match, helping the "redmen" to a 1:0 win. In the late 1990s, Ivanov played for Jeju United then known as Bucheon SK in South Korean K League. A serious car accident essentially forced him to retire at the age of 30, though he did make a number of appearances for Botev Plovdiv and his hometown club Elhovo (in the latter case as a player-manager between 2004 and 2006).

== Coaching career ==
In August 2017, Ivanov was appointed as manager of Tundzha Yagoda.
