= Adalbert Zafirov =

Bulgarian footballer and manager

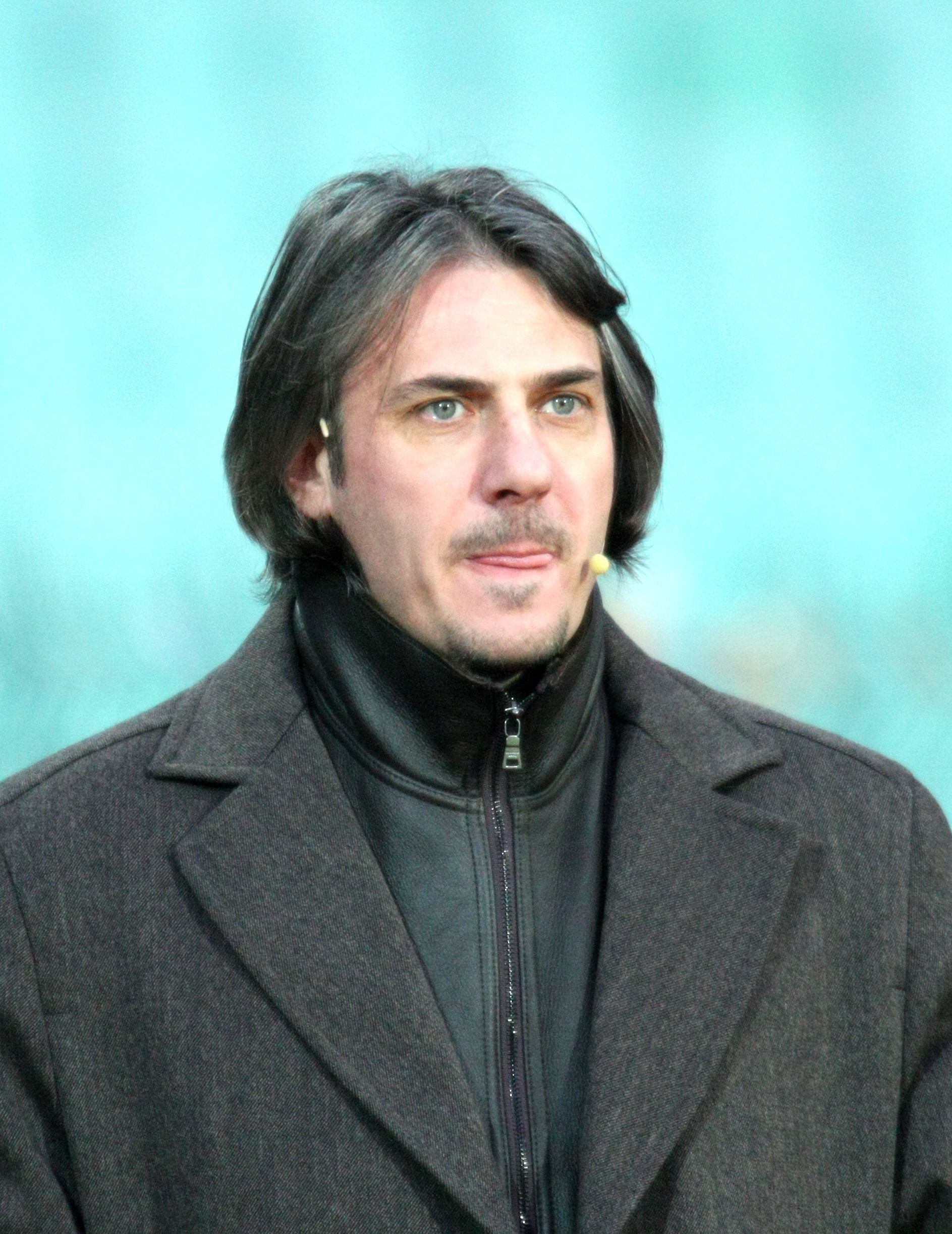
- Zafirov in 2014

Personal information
- Full name: Adalbert Ivanov Zafirov
- Date of birth: 29 September 1969 (age 57)
- Place of birth: Sofia, Bulgaria
- Height: 1.85 m (6 ft 1 in)
- Position: Centre-back

Senior career*
Years	Team	Apps	(Gls)
1990–1992	Lokomotiv GO	53	(2)
1992–1995	Lokomotiv Sofia	86	(1)
1996–1997	CSKA Sofia	54	(6)
1998	Arminia Bielefeld	12	(0)
1999	CSKA Sofia	10	(0)
1999–2001	Union Berlin	34	(3)
2001	CSKA Sofia	2	(0)
2002	Lokomotiv Sofia	20	(1)
2002–2003	Cherno More	24	(5)
2003–2004	Anagennisi Dherynia	24	(1)
2004–2005	CSKA Sofia	13	(0)
2005–2007	Velbazhd Kyustendil		
2007–2008	Hebar Pazardzhik		
Total		357	(19)

International career
1992–1998	Bulgaria	6	(0)

Managerial career
- 2009–2010: CSKA Sofia (assistant)
- 2010: CSKA Sofia
- 2011: Kaliakra Kavarna
- 2012: Cherno More
- 2015: Botev Vratsa
- 2016: CSKA 1948
- * Club domestic league appearances and goals

Adalbert Ivanov Zafirov (Bulgarian: Адалберт Иванов Зафиров; born 29 September 1969) is a Bulgarian former football player and football manager who played as a centre-back. He made six appearances for the Bulgaria national football team and participated in the 1998 FIFA World Cup. Most recently, he managed CSKA 1948 Sofia.

== Club career ==
Zafirov was born on 29 September 1969, in Sofia. A product of the CSKA Sofia youth academy, he joined the first team in the summer of 1989 and played in friendly matches, but did not make an official appearance. In January 1990, he moved to Lokomotiv Gorna Oryahovitsa, where he made his senior debut and remained until July 1992. He then moved to Lokomotiv Sofia, where he played until 1995, helping the club win the Bulgarian Cup in the 1994–95 season.

After returning to CSKA Sofia in December 1995, Zafirov made his official debut on 16 February 1996, in a match against Botev Plovdiv. He subsequently established himself as a regular defender and helped the club win both the Bulgarian league and the Bulgarian Cup in the 1996–97 season. In December 1997, he moved to Germany to join Arminia Bielefeld.

Zafirov played for Arminia Bielefeld until 1998 before returning to CSKA Sofia in early 1999. In July of the same year, he moved to Germany to join Union Berlin, where he played for two seasons until 2001. During his time at Union Berlin, he made 34 league appearances and scored three goals.

In July 2001, he returned to CSKA Sofia and played there until December of that year, before moving to Lokomotiv Sofia, where he remained until July 2002. In the 2002–03 season, he played for Cherno More, scoring five goals in 24 league appearances, and in the 2003–04 season he played for Anagennisi Deryneia in Cyprus.

In July 2004, Zafirov rejoined CSKA Sofia and helped the club win the Bulgarian league title in the 2004–05 season. He subsequently played for Velbazhd Kyustendil and Hebar Pazardzhik, retiring from professional football at the end of the 2007–08 season.

== International career ==
Zafirov was first called up to the Bulgaria national football team in 1992 and made six appearances for the national team between 1992 and 1998, scoring no goals. He made one appearance in 1992, followed by two in 1995, one in 1997, and two in 1998. On 26 August 1992, he made his international debut in a friendly match against Turkey, starting the match before being substituted at half-time.

In 1995, he played in friendly matches against Argentina, Macedonia, and Uzbekistan. In 1997, he played against Russia in the 1998 FIFA World Cup European qualifiers. In 1998, he appeared in friendly matches against Macedonia and Morocco.

Zafirov was also included in Bulgaria's squad for the 1998 FIFA World Cup. However, he did not play in any of Bulgaria's three group-stage matches against Paraguay, Nigeria, and Spain, remaining on the substitutes' bench for all three games.

== Coaching career ==
On 30 March 2010, CSKA Sofia coach Ioan Andone resigned, it was announced that the team will be trained by Adalbert Zafirov until the end of the season.

Zafirov was appointed as head coach of Cherno More Varna in late September 2012, following the resignation of Stefan Genov. However, he was released from his duties in mid December 2012, despite winning his last game in charge of the team - 1–0 against Levski Sofia in the second leg of a Bulgarian Cup match.

In late December 2014, Zafirov became the manager of B PFG club Botev Vratsa, but resigned on 27 April 2015. He had a short managerial stint with CSKA 1948 between early and late August 2016.
