= Tsvetomir Chipev =

Bulgarian footballer

Personal information
- Date of birth: 16 August 1977 (age 49)
- Place of birth: Sofia, Bulgaria
- Height: 1.81 m (5 ft 11 in)
- Position: Midfielder

Youth career
- Levski Sofia

Senior career*
Years	Team	Apps	(Gls)
1996–1998	Levski Sofia	5	(0)
1999	Pirin Blagoevgrad		
1999–2001	Oberhausen	56	(0)
2001–2003	Chemnitzer FC	57	(4)
2003–2005	Erzgebirge Aue	38	(2)
2006–2007	OFI	24	(2)
2007–2008	Nea Salamina		
2008	Zhejiang Lucheng		
2008–2009	Kallithea		
2009–2011	Makedonikos		
- * Club domestic league appearances and goals

Tsvetomir Chipev (Bulgarian: Цветомир Чипев; born 16 August 1977 in Sofia) is a retired Bulgarian footballer who played as a midfielder.

== Career ==
Chipev started his career with Levski Sofia and won the Bulgarian Cup in 1998. Having left Levski in December 1998, he had short spell at Pirin Blagoevgrad before joined German side Rot-Weiß Oberhausen.

After two seasons at Niederrheinstadion in the 2. Bundesliga, Chipev signed with Chemnitzer FC in 2001. After leaving Chemnitzer at the end of the 2002–03 season, he joined Erzgebirge Aue.

== Honours ==
=== Club ===
Levski Sofia

- Bulgarian Cup: 1997–98
