= Ivo Slavchev =

Bulgarian footballer

Personal information
- Date of birth: 21 January 1968 (age 58)
- Place of birth: Pernik, Bulgaria
- Position: Defensive midfielder

Senior career*
Years	Team	Apps	(Gls)
1985–1992	Minyor Pernik	186	(18)
1992–1996	Lokomotiv Sofia	110	(14)
1996–1999	CSKA Sofia	47	(7)
1999	Slavia Sofia	6	(0)
2000	Minyor Pernik	8	(0)
2000–2001	Marek Dupnitsa	17	(2)
2001–2002	Akademik Svishtov	14	(1)

International career
1986–1987	Bulgaria U19	10	(3)
1988–1990	Bulgaria U21	28	(3)
1991–1995	Bulgaria	2	(0)
- * Club domestic league appearances and goals

Ivo Slavchev (Bulgarian: Иво Славчев; born 21 January 1968) is a Bulgarian former professional footballer who played as a defensive midfielder. Throughout his club career, he played for Minyor Pernik, Lokomotiv Sofia, CSKA Sofia, Slavia Sofia, Marek Dupnitsa and Akademik Svishtov.

He was a squad member at the 1987 FIFA World Youth Championship.
