= Atanas Uzunov =

Bulgarian football referee

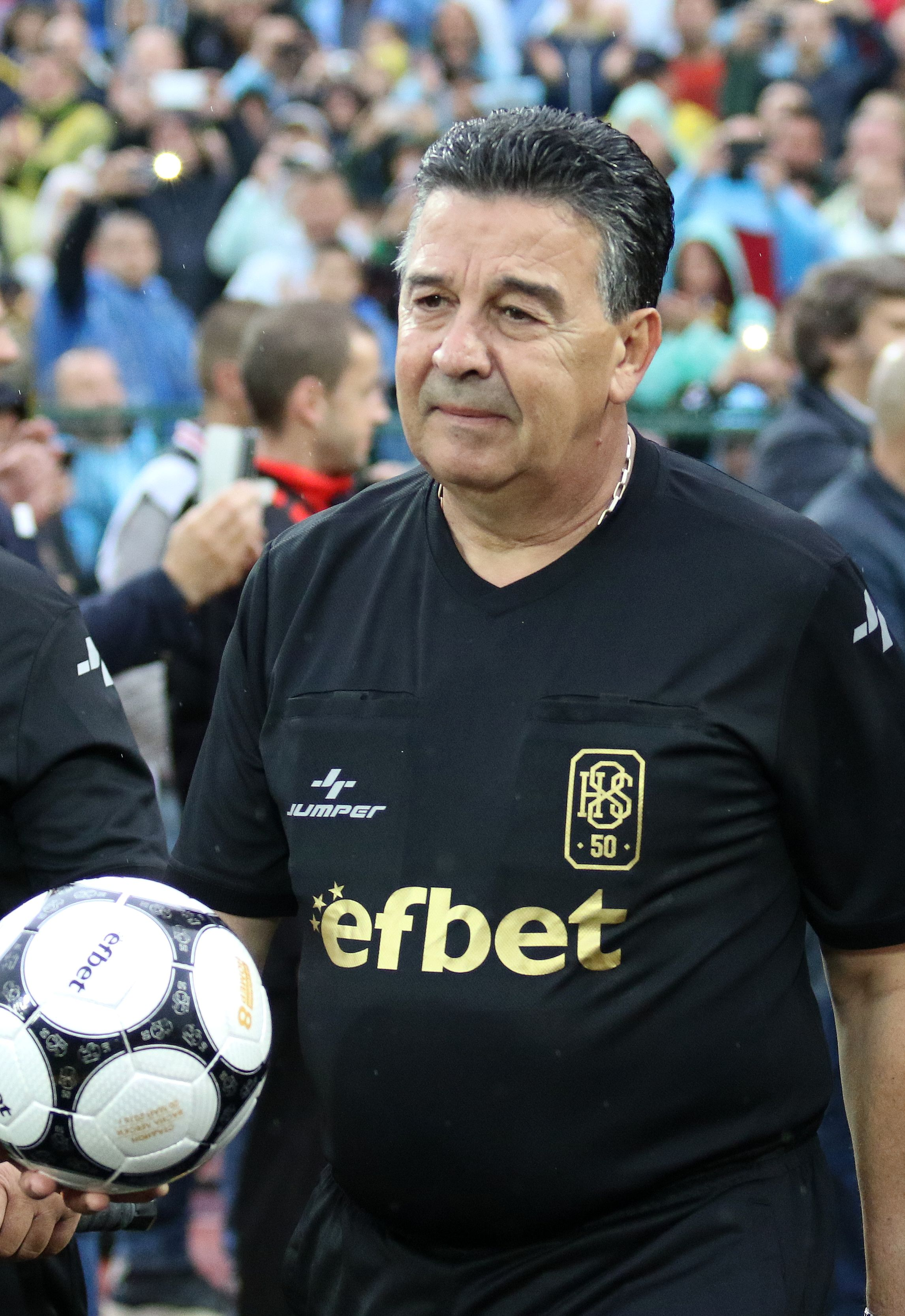
Uzunov in 2016

Atanas Uzunov (Bulgarian: Атанас Узунов, born 10 November 1955) is a retired Bulgarian football referee. Born in the city of Plovdiv, his career started in 1979 and ended in the year 2000. During that time he was the first official for 189 matches (current record) in the Bulgarian A Professional Football Group, the fixture between Switzerland and the Netherlands in the UEFA Euro 1996 group stages and many UEFA Champions League group stage matches as well.

After his retirement he was the chairman of the Bulgarian Refereeing Committee for a short period and later chairman of hometown club PFC Lokomotiv Plovdiv.
