= 1997–98 A Group =

50th completed season of top-tier football league in Bulgaria

A Group
- Season: 1997–98
- Dates: 2 August 1997 – 10 May 1998
- Champions: Litex Lovech (1st title)
- Relegated: Olimpik; Spartak Pleven; Etar
- Champions League: Litex
- UEFA Cup: CSKA
- Matches: 240
- Goals: 696 (2.9 per match)
- Top goalscorer: Boncho Genchev; Anton Spasov; (17 goals each)

The 1997–98 A Group was the 50th season of the A Football Group, the top Bulgarian professional league for association football clubs, since its establishment in 1948.

== Overview ==
It was contested by 16 teams, and Litex Lovech won the championship.

== Team information ==
=== Stadia and locations ===
The following teams have ensured their participation in A Group for season 1997–98 (listed in alphabetical order):

Location of teams in 1997–98 A Group
Sofia 1997–98 A Group football clubs

| Team | City | Stadium | Capacity |
|---|---|---|---|
| Botev | Plovdiv | Hristo Botev | 18,000 |
| CSKA | Sofia | Bulgarian Army | 22,995 |
| Dobrudzha | Dobrich | Druzhba | 12,500 |
| Etar | Veliko Tarnovo | Ivaylo | 18,000 |
| Levski | Kyustendil | Osogovo | 10,000 |
| Levski | Sofia | Georgi Asparuhov | 29,986 |
| Litex | Lovech | Lovech | 7,050 |
| Lokomotiv | Plovdiv | Lokomotiv | 24,000 |
| Lokomotiv | Sofia | Lokomotiv | 22,000 |
| Metalurg | Pernik | Metalurg | 18,000 |
| Minyor | Pernik | Minyor | 18,000 |
| Neftochimic | Burgas | Lazur | 18,037 |
| Olimpik | Galata | Georgi Benkovski | 10,000 |
| Slavia | Sofia | Ovcha Kupel | 18,000 |
| Spartak | Pleven | Slavi Aleksiev | 21,940 |
| Spartak | Varna | Spartak | 8,000 |

== League standings ==
| Pos | Team | Pld | W | D | L | GF | GA | GD | Pts | Qualification or relegation |
|---|---|---|---|---|---|---|---|---|---|---|
| 1 | Litex Lovech (C) | 30 | 21 | 6 | 3 | 73 | 25 | +48 | 69 | Qualification for Champions League first qualifying round |
| 2 | Levski Sofia | 30 | 19 | 7 | 4 | 73 | 27 | +46 | 64 | Qualification for Cup Winners' Cup qualifying round |
| 3 | CSKA Sofia | 30 | 18 | 7 | 5 | 71 | 29 | +42 | 61 | Qualification for UEFA Cup first qualifying round |
| 4 | Neftochimic Burgas | 30 | 17 | 4 | 9 | 59 | 31 | +28 | 55 | |
| 5 | Slavia Sofia | 30 | 15 | 9 | 6 | 51 | 30 | +21 | 54 | |
| 6 | Levski Kyustendil | 30 | 15 | 1 | 14 | 45 | 40 | +5 | 46 | |
| 7 | Spartak Varna | 30 | 12 | 6 | 12 | 42 | 36 | +6 | 42 | Qualification for Intertoto Cup first round |
| 8 | Minyor Pernik | 30 | 12 | 5 | 13 | 32 | 35 | −3 | 41 | |
| 9 | Lokomotiv Sofia | 30 | 11 | 6 | 13 | 42 | 40 | +2 | 39 | |
| 10 | Metalurg Pernik | 30 | 11 | 4 | 15 | 28 | 36 | −8 | 37 | |
| 11 | Botev Plovdiv | 30 | 11 | 3 | 16 | 35 | 48 | −13 | 36 | |
| 12 | Dobrudzha Dobrich | 30 | 11 | 3 | 16 | 33 | 55 | −22 | 36 | |
| 13 | Lokomotiv Plovdiv | 30 | 11 | 3 | 16 | 31 | 58 | −27 | 36 | |
| 14 | Olimpik Galata (R) | 30 | 11 | 2 | 17 | 26 | 47 | −21 | 35 | Relegation to 1998–99 B Group |
| 15 | Spartak Pleven (R) | 30 | 7 | 0 | 23 | 32 | 75 | −43 | 21 | Relegation to 1998–99 B Group |
| 16 | Etar Veliko Tarnovo (R) | 30 | 4 | 2 | 24 | 21 | 82 | −61 | 14 | Relegation to 1998–99 B Group |

Source: rsssf.com
(C) Champions; (R) Relegated

== Results ==
| Home \ Away | BOT | CSK | DOB | ETA | LVK | LEV | LIT | LPL | LSO | MET | MIN | NEF | OLI | SLA | SPL | SPV |
|---|---|---|---|---|---|---|---|---|---|---|---|---|---|---|---|---|
| Botev Plovdiv | | 3–1 | 1–0 | 5–1 | 0–0 | 2–4 | 2–3 | 1–0 | 2–1 | 1–0 | 3–0 | 0–3 | 2–1 | 1–1 | 4–0 | 2–0 |
| CSKA Sofia | 3–0 | | 4–1 | 5–1 | 3–1 | 0–1 | 1–1 | 3–1 | 1–1 | 2–0 | 5–0 | 3–0 | 5–0 | 1–1 | 5–0 | 2–1 |
| Dobrudzha Dobrich | 1–0 | 1–1 | | 3–0 | 1–0 | 1–4 | 1–1 | 2–0 | 0–5 (Note: Match awarded after was abandoned at 65th minute by the result 0–2.) | 1–0 | 1–0 | 0–0 | 4–2 | 1–0 | 4–0 | 2–0 |
| Etar Veliko Tarnovo | 1–0 | 0–2 | 1–2 | | 1–4 | 0–3 | 1–3 | 2–1 | 0–3 | 1–0 | 0–1 | 1–3 | 1–1 | 3–4 | 0–2 | 1–3 |
| Levski Kyustendil | 4–0 | 1–2 | 1–0 | 3–1 | | 1–3 | 3–0 (Note: Match awarded as Litex Lovech fielded ineligible player Radostin Kishishev (originally finished 0–0).) | 2–0 | 2–0 | 2–0 | 3–0 | 2–1 | 2–0 | 2–0 | 3–1 | 2–0 |
| Levski Sofia | 1–0 | 3–3 | 3–1 | 5–0 | 4–0 | | 1–1 | 5–0 | 1–0 | 7–0 | 1–0 | 2–3 | 3–0 | 1–1 | 3–0 | 2–1 |
| Litex Lovech | 3–0 | 2–0 | 3–0 | 3–0 | 3–0 | 0–4 (Note: Match awarded as Litex Lovech fielded ineligible player Radostin Kishishev (originally finished 1–1).) | | 6–0 | 3–1 | 4–0 | 2–0 | 1–0 | 3–0 | 1–1 | 4–0 | 4–0 |
| Lokomotiv Plovdiv | 1–0 | 1–4 | 2–0 | 4–1 | 2–1 | 1–1 | 1–3 | | 0–1 | 3–2 | 1–0 | 2–1 | 1–0 | 1–1 | 3–2 | 1–0 |
| Lokomotiv Sofia | 0–0 | 1–2 | 4–2 | 1–0 | 4–2 | 0–0 | 0–3 | 2–3 | | 2–0 | 1–0 | 1–1 | 3–0 | 1–2 | 2–0 | 1–1 |
| Metalurg Pernik | 2–0 | 1–0 | 3–0 | 1–1 | 3–1 | 0–0 | 1–1 | 2–0 | 2–1 | | 2–3 | 1–0 | 2–0 | 0–1 | 3–0 | 1–0 |
| Minyor Pernik | 2–0 | 2–2 | 4–0 | 0–1 | 2–0 | 2–1 | 0–2 | 1–0 | 3–0 | 0–0 | | 1–1 | 1–0 | 1–0 | 3–0 | 2–1 |
| Neftochimic Burgas | 2–0 | 1–3 | 4–1 | 7–0 | 3–1 | 3–0 | 3–2 | 4–0 | 4–1 | 1–0 | 2–0 | | 5–0 | 0–1 | 4–1 | 0–0 |
| Olimpik Galata | 0–1 | 0–0 | 1–0 | 2–0 | 1–0 | 2–1 | 2–4 | 2–0 | 2–0 | 1–0 | 2–1 | 3–1 | | 0–2 | 2–1 | 2–0 |
| Slavia Sofia | 5–3 | 2–3 | 3–1 | 4–0 | 3–1 | 2–2 | 1–2 | 2–2 | 2–1 | 1–0 | 1–1 | 2–0 | 4–0 | | 3–0 | 0–1 |
| Spartak Pleven | 4–2 | 0–3 | 5–1 | 4–1 | 0–1 | 2–5 | 1–4 | 2–0 | 1–3 | 0–1 | 2–1 | 1–3 | 1–0 | 0–1 | | 1–3 |
| Spartak Varna | 4–0 | 2–1 | 3–1 | 3–1 | 2–0 | 1–3 | 1–1 | 5–0 | 1–1 | 2–1 | 1–1 | 1–2 | 2–0 | 0–0 | 3–1 | |

Source: A PFG (in Bulgarian)
Legend: Blue = home team win; Yellow = draw; Red = away team win.

== Champions ==
Litex Lovech

Goalkeepers
| (Bulgaria) Vitomir Vutov | 28 | (0) |
| (Bulgaria) Stoyan Stavrev | 2 | (0) |

Defenders
| (Bulgaria) Petar Kushev | 16 | (2) |
| (Bulgaria) Stefan Kolev | 21 | (1) |
| (Bulgaria) Nikolay Dimitrov | 24 | (1) |
| (Bulgaria) Dimitar Karadaliev | 1 | (0) |
| (Bulgaria) Zlatomir Zagorčić | 27 | (0) |
| (Bulgaria) Ivaylo Petkov | 27 | (3) |
| (Bulgaria) Radostin Kishishev | 5 | (0) |
| (Bulgaria) Dimitar Balabanov | 6 | (0) |
| (Bulgaria) Rosen Kirilov | 28 | (0) |
| (Bulgaria) Koycho Ivanov | 1 | (0) |

Midfielders
| (Bulgaria) Rosen Emilov | 17 | (1) |
| (Bulgaria) Mariyan Todorov | 28 | (6) |
| (Bulgaria) Stoycho Stoilov | 30 | (8) |
| (Bulgaria) Daniel Ostrovski | 5 | (0) |
| (Serbia and Montenegro) Dragoljub Simonović | 22 | (6) |
| (Bulgaria) Ivaylo Petev* | 12 | (2) |
| (Bulgaria) Veselin Sarbakov | 16 | (3) |
| (Bulgaria) Emil Tsanev* | 2 | (0) |

Forwards
| (Bulgaria) Stefan Yurukov* | 14 | (13) |
| (Bulgaria) Dimcho Belyakov* | 14 | (5) |
| (Albania) Alban Bushi | 15 | (4) |
| (Bulgaria) Svetoslav Todorov | 19 | (9) |
| (Brazil) Luis Carlos Mota | 5 | (1) |
| (Serbia and Montenegro) Igor Bogdanović | 15 | (6) |
| (Bulgaria) Metodi Stoynev | 8 | (1) |

Manager
| (Bulgaria) Dimitar Dimitrov |

- Petev, Tsanev, Yurukov and Belyakov left the club during a season.

== Top scorers ==
| Rank | Scorer | Club | Goals |
|---|---|---|---|
| 1 | (Bulgaria) Anton Spasov | Neftochimic Burgas | 17 |
| 1 | (Bulgaria) Boncho Genchev | CSKA Sofia | 17 |
| 3 | (Bulgaria) Stefan Yurukov | Litex Lovech | 13 |
| 3 | (Serbia and Montenegro) Danilo Dončić | Lokomotiv Sofia | 13 |
| 5 | (Bulgaria) Stanimir Stoilov | Slavia Sofia | 12 |
| 5 | (Bulgaria) Valentin Stanchev | Spartak Varna | 12 |
| 7 | (Bulgaria) Ivaylo Andonov | CSKA Sofia | 11 |
| 8 | (Bulgaria) Aleksandar Aleksandrov | Levski Sofia | 10 |
| 8 | (Bulgaria) Plamen Petrov | Levski Kyustendil | 10 |
| 8 | (Bulgaria) Georgi Ivanov | Levski Sofia | 10 |
| 8 | (Bulgaria) Iliya Voynov | Spartak Pleven | 10 |

- Source:1997–98 Top Goalscorers
