= Glozhene =

Glozhene may refer to:

- Glozhene, Lovech Province, a village in Teteven Municipality, Bulgaria
- Glozhene Monastery, a monastery near the village of Glozhene, Lovech Province
- Glozhene Cove, a cove in Antarctica named after the village of Glozhene, Lovech Province, and the Glozhene Monastery
- Glozhene, Vratsa Province
