= Aleksei Petrov (businessman) =

Bulgarian businessman (1962–2023)

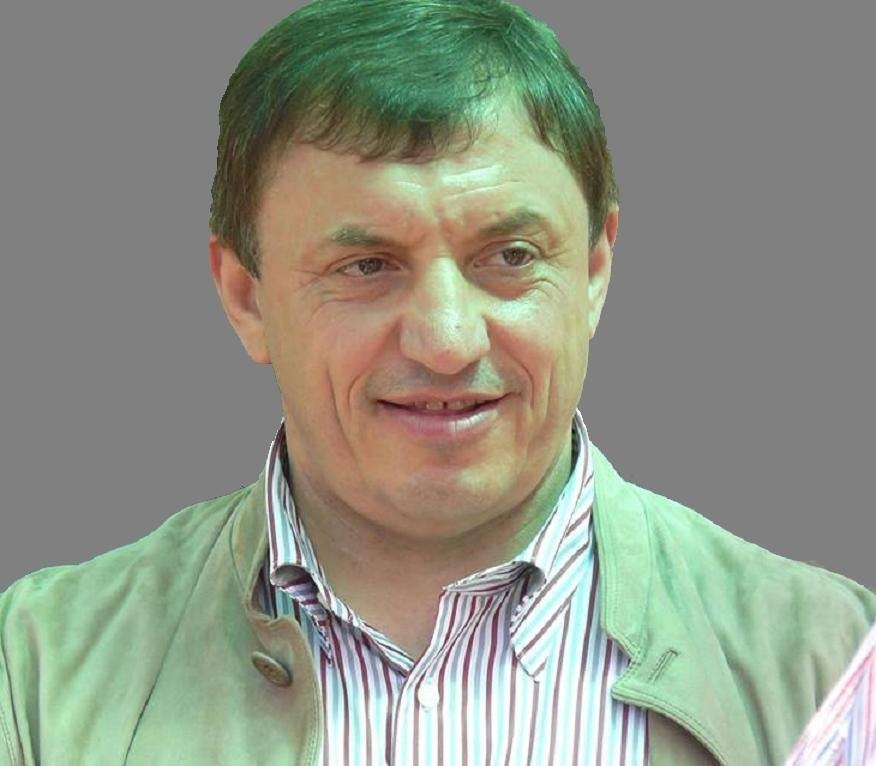
- Petrov in 2014
- Born: Aleksei Iliyev Petrov; 23 April 1962; Babintsi, Bulgaria
- Died: 16 August 2023 (aged 61); Sofia, Bulgaria
- Education: Academy of the Ministry of Interior, in Sofia
- Occupation: Businessman

Aleksei Iliyev Petrov (Bulgarian: Алексей Илиев Петров; 23 April 1962 – 16 August 2023) was a Bulgarian oligarch. He was a candidate in the 2011 Bulgarian presidential election and a rival to former Prime Minister Boyko Borisov. He was considered to be the head of Order, Law and Justice and the weekly tabloid Galeria.

== Biography ==
Born in Babintsi on 23 April 1962, Petrov had a fortune of "hundreds of millions of dollars" according to Cablegate. He had worked for eight years in the State Agency for National Security and later, the SOBT counter-terrorism unit. He held a doctorate in economics, obtained at the Academy of the Ministry of Interior, in Sofia. Todor Zhivkov had tasked him with suppressing Muslim activists who were considered pro-Turkish. He was also a master of karate and befriended Boyko Borisov at a karate gym in 1982. After the fall of the communist regime, he entered the private security and insurance sector. After working in several companies, occasionally engaging in racketeering, he became head of the insurance company Spartak, which was renamed Lev Ins after support from Israeli funds. It became the third-largest insurance company in Bulgaria (the largest in car insurance), with profits of 70 million euros in 2009.

On 14 August 2002, Petrov was seriously injured by a shooter armed with a machine gun while leaving a swimming pool. On 16 December 2002, he filed a complaint against a former deputy for defamation. The deputy had implicated him in a murder and dealings with the Serbian mafia, shortly after the assassination of military prosecutor Nikolai Kolev. Although he was close to Chief Prosecutor Nikola Filchev, his complaints were dismissed, and a final appeal to the European Court of Human Rights was dismissed in November 2010.

In 2001, Petrov became an informant with the State Agency for National Security, where he became an official adviser in 2008. In 2006, he organized a secret meeting between Minister of Interior Rumen Petkov and the Golev brothers, two figures of the Bulgarian mafia, who were acquitted in November 2009. That year, Petkov announced that Petrov had been a secret collaborator with the State Agency for National Security.

On 10 February 2010, Petrov was detained on the allegation that he was the leader of the criminal group "Octopus", which had engaged in racketeering and extortion. In October 2010, he was placed on house arrest, while his charges were reduced to racketeering and extortion against two individuals in 1998 and 2000. In February 2014, the investigation into his activities was terminated and the prosecutor's office was unable to find sufficient evidence to take him to court. On 29 October 2015, another assassination attempt against him was carried out, this time using a grenade launcher, although the operation failed. In July 2021, Petrov was officially acquitted in the "Octopus" case.

On 16 August 2023, Petrov was shot with a rifle while on a walk in Sofia, and died immediately. He was 61.
