= Cherni Vit cheese =

Bulgarian sheep milk cheese from the village of Cherni Vit

Green cheese "Cherni Vit"
- Country of origin: Bulgaria
- Region: Central Balkan Mountains
- Town: Cherni Vit, Teteven Munisipallity
- Source of milk: Sheep
- Pasteurised: No
- Texture: Soft

Cherni Vit (Bulgarian: „Черни Вит“) is a Bulgarian cheese exclusively produced in and around the village of Cherni Vit in Teteven Municipality, Lovech Province. Made from sheep milk, Cherni Vit cheese owes the green colour of its crust and its characteristic taste to the formation of mold. This occurs naturally due to the specific conditions in the region and the technology of production. Produced for centuries, Cherni Vit cheese was nearly extinct in the 2000s until it was rediscovered and popularised by Slow Food representatives.

== History ==
Cherni Vit cheese has been continuously produced in Cherni Vit, a village at the northern foot of the Balkan Mountains, for several centuries. However, in the past the mold was considered poisonous by the locals, who would often throw moldy batches of cheese away, considering it an undesired side effect of cheese production. Although it was very popular in the village in the mid-20th century, in the 1970s green cheese quickly began to disappear due to the replacement of the wooden casks required for the molding with plastic cans. By the early 21st century, Cherni Vit green cheese had ceased production and all but disappeared.

In 2007, the mayor of Cherni Vit, Tsvetan Dimitrov, was contacted by Italian representatives of the Slow Food movement who enquired about traditional dishes from the village which were in danger of disappearing. Eventually, Dimitrov discovered a single matchbox-sized piece of green cheese that was preserved in the cellar of an elderly couple who lived in the highlands above the village. The Italians were impressed with the green cheese and it was presented at the international festival in Bra to a great reception. According to Slow Food representatives, Cherni Vit cheese is the only traditional mold cheese in the Balkans.

As of 2009, Cherni Vit green cheese is not commercially available in Bulgaria or commercially exported from the country. This is due to administrative hindrances which prohibit farms from the direct sale of dairy products unless they are approved by the veterinary services.

== Description ==
The Cherni Vit cheese variety is made from sheep milk using a basic technology. The specific natural and weather conditions of the Balkan Mountains near the village of Cherni Vit are very important for its production. It is a very soft cheese with a dense, hot taste and a specific, rich aroma. The cheese is silvery white on the inside and covered by a naturally formed green mold crust. Essentially, Cherni Vit cheese is a variety of white brine cheese (sirene) modified by the growth of mold.

Cherni Vit green cheese grows in wooden casks, which allow part of the brine to evaporate through the wood, contributing to the formation of a mold crust. Other factors that contribute to the taste of the cheese are the air humidity, the low winter temperatures in Cherni Vit and the significant amplitude between day and night temperature. The cheese also has a protein content that is different from that of cheeses from other Bulgarian regions. Milk from the Karakachan sheep and the autochthonous (native) Teteven sheep breeds is used for the preparation of the cheese.

The process of producing Cherni Vit cheese begins in the summer (after Saint George's Day), when sheep are taken by shepherds to high mountain pastures. When the sheep are brought back in September or October, the cheese, already placed in wooden casks, is stored in humid cellars in the village, at a temperature of 10 to 12 °C (50 to 54 °F). Mold develops on the surface of the cheese only after the casks are opened.

== See also ==
- Blue cheese – Cheese with blue veins of mold
- Brined cheese – Cheese that is matured in brine
- List of cheeses
