= Ribaritsa =

Ribaritsa (Bulgarian: Рибарица; also Ribarica, Ribaritza) is the name of two Bulgarian villages:

- Ribaritsa, Lovech Province
- Ribaritsa, Sofia Province
