= Georgi Benkovski =

Bulgarian revolutionary

- Гаврил Груев Хлътев
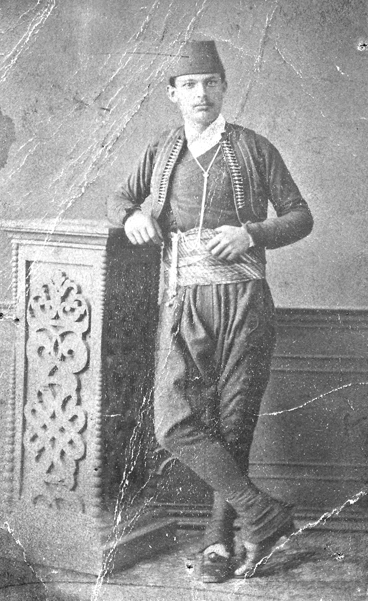
- Georgi Benkovski (1843–1876)
- Born: 1843; Koprivshtitsa, Ottoman Empire (now Bulgaria)
- Died: May 12, 1876 (aged 32–33); Ribaritsa, Ottoman Empire (now Bulgaria)
- Military career
- Allegiance: Bulgaria
- Rank: Leader of the 4th Revolutionary District
- Conflicts: April Uprising

Georgi Benkovski (Bulgarian: Георги Бенковски) (c. 1843 – 12 May 1876) was the pseudonym of Gavril Gruev Hlatev (Гаврил Груев Хлътев), a Bulgarian revolutionary and leading figure in the organization and direction of the Bulgarian anti-Ottoman April Uprising of 1876 and apostle of its 4th Revolutionary District.

== Biography ==
Born around 1843 to the family of the small-time merchant and craftsman Gruyo Hlatev, Benkovski was a native of the bustling sub-Balkan town of Koprivshtitsa and had two sisters, Kuna and Vasilya. Due to his difficult childhood, Benkovski had to drop out of school after finishing third grade in order to be trained as a tailor by his mother and make a living. Discontent with his job, he became a frieze dealer and left for what is now modern day Turkey together with a friend to sell their products, with little success. For some ten years Benkovski lived in various cities of the old Ottoman empire, including Istanbul (Tsarigrad), İzmir (Smyrna) and Alexandria, engaging in various professions. His later stories describe his work as a bodyguard of the Persian consul, claiming his uniform was so beautiful people thought he was the consul himself. During his travels, Benkovski learned seven foreign languages to the level of basic competency: Arabic, Ottoman Turkish, Greek, Italian, Polish, Romanian and Persian.

Benkovski became involved in the revolutionary activities of the Bulgarian Revolutionary Central Committee after meeting Stoyan Zaimov in Bucharest, Romania; he was also introduced to Vasil Levski and Hristo Botev's revolutionary and democratic ideas. In the summer of 1875, he joined a group of revolutionaries intending to set Constantinople on fire and assassinate sultan Abdülaziz.

He was given the French passport of a Polish émigré, Anton Benkowski, whose family name he adopted as a pseudonym; he later changed his first name to Georgi. The Pole was an anti-Russian revolutionary who had attempted to assassinate the Russian governor of Warsaw and had to serve a life sentence on Sakhalin. Anton Benkowski managed to flee to Japan, where he acquired a passport and from where he fled to the Ottoman Empire. In Diyarbakır, the Pole met Zaimov and traded his French passport for five Turkish liras and the assistance to acquire an Ottoman passport.

Benkovski was initially selected as Panayot Volov's assistant in the organization of the 4th Revolutionary District of the April Uprising, but due to his fervour and leadership qualities Volov conceded the position of head apostle to Benkovski voluntarily. Thanks to Benkovski's work, the insurrectional preparations developed best in this district.

When the April Uprising broke out prematurely in Koprivshtitsa on 2 May [O.S. 20 April] 1876, Benkovski was in nearby Panagyurishte along with most other apostles. Upon hearing that fighting has broken out in Koprivshtitsa, Benkovski formed an over-200-strong detachment and went to assist the insurrectionists. His detachment was known as "The Flying Band" (Хвърковата чета, Hvarkovata cheta) because it toured the entire region tirelessly, mobilizing many insurgents and playing an important part in the fighting. The band was even joined by six Croats from Dalmatia and the German Albrecht, all workers at the Belovo railway station. One of the Croats, Stephen the Dalmatian, went to become the band's final standard-bearer. One woman also joined the band: Maria Ivanova-Sutić, the Bulgarian wife of a Croatian railway worker.

In the wake of the uprising's suppression, Benkovski and the surviving members of the band (Stephen the Dalmatian, Zahari Stoyanov and Father Kiril) headed to the Teteven Balkan Mountains. On 24 May [O.S. 12 May] 1876, the band's location was betrayed by a local shepherd and the revolutionaries were ambushed by an Ottoman search party. Benkovski was shot dead in the Kostina area near Ribaritsa while crossing a river bridge. He was subsequently beheaded; his head was sent to Botevgrad and then to Sofia. The events were documented by Zahari Stoyanov and published in his Memoirs of the Bulgarian Uprisings; the author was the only one of the four who managed to escape.

== Honours ==
Benkovski Nunatak in Breznik Heights on Greenwich Island, South Shetland Islands, Antarctica is named for Georgi Benkovski, as are six villages in Bulgaria and a neighbourhood of Sofia (the former villages of Birimirtsi and Obradovtsi). The Georgi Benkovski Stadium in Pazardzhik, the football club FC Benkovski Byala and the Bulgarian Air Force academy also bear his name.

== Gallery ==
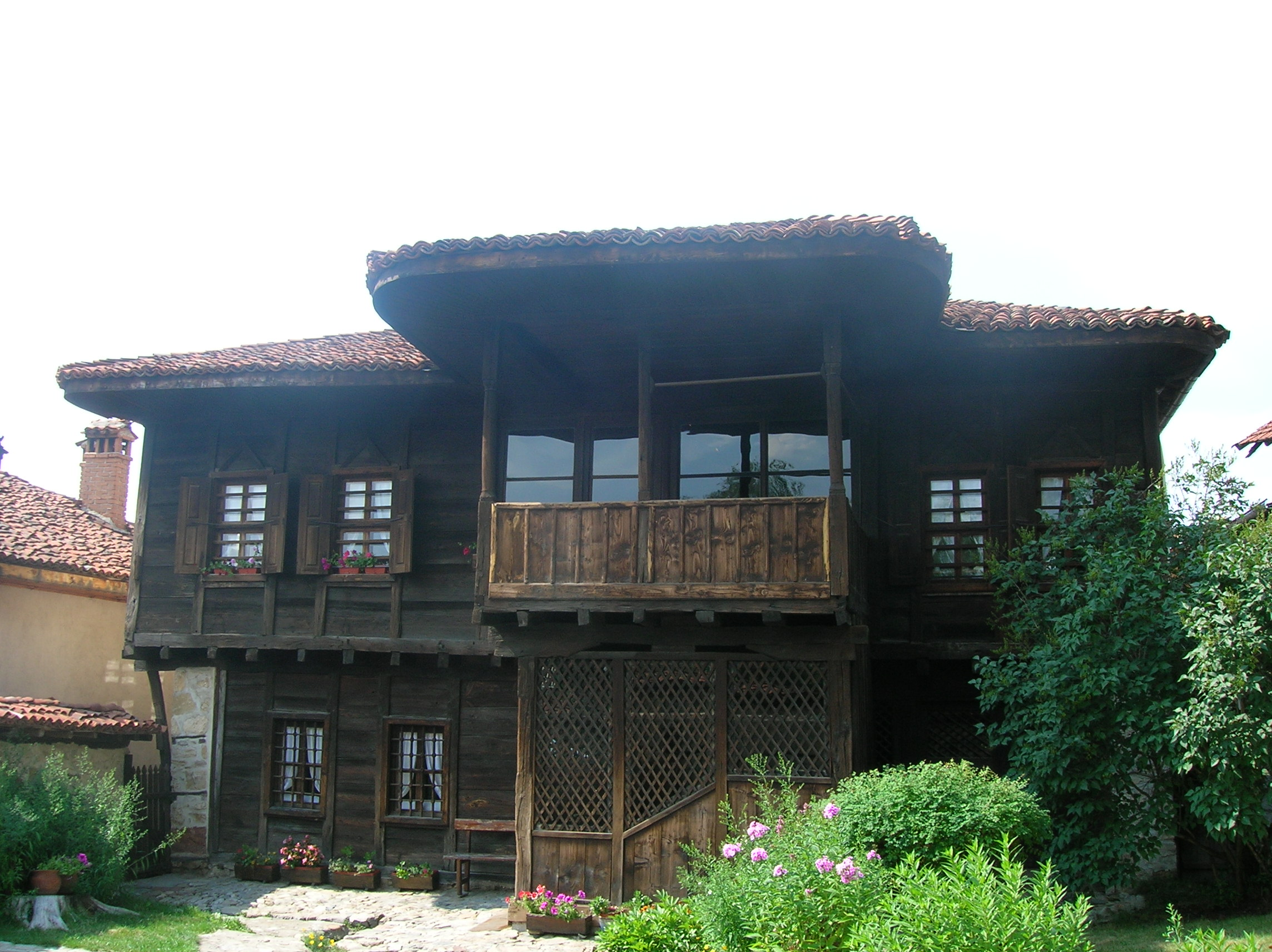
Benkovski's native house in Koprivshtitsa

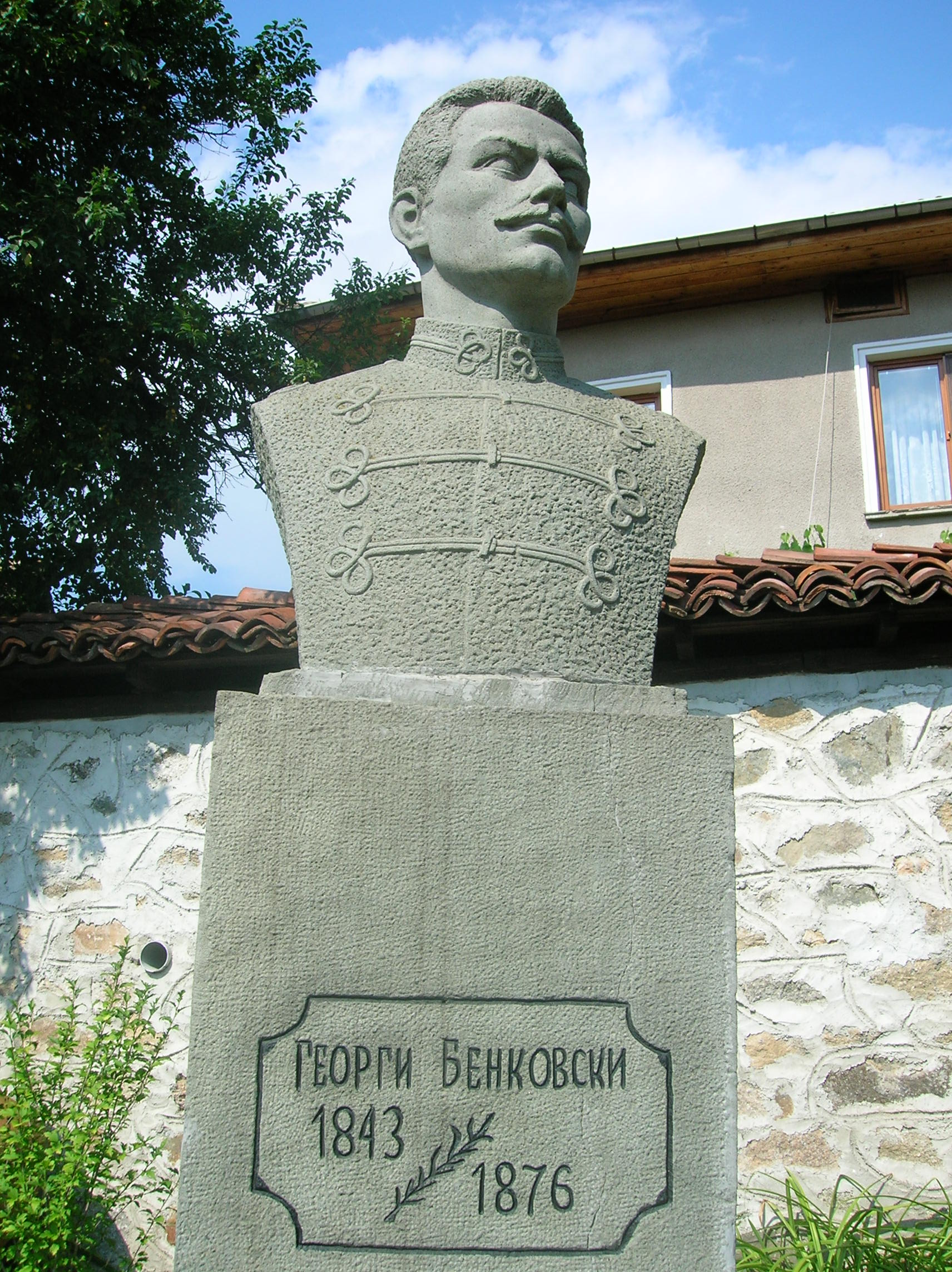
Benkovski's bust at his native house in Koprivshtitsa

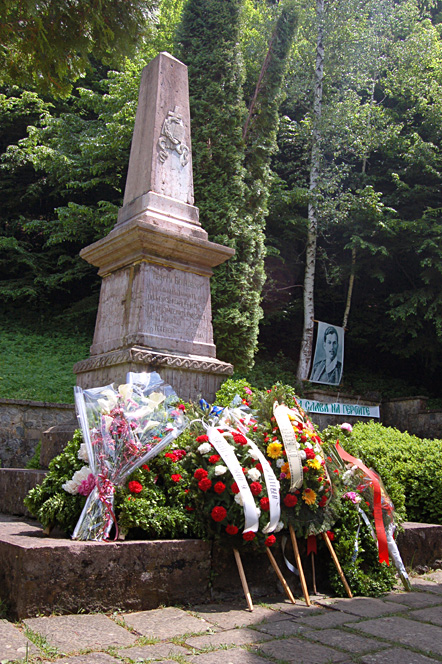
Monument to Benkovski at the place of his death in Ribaritsa

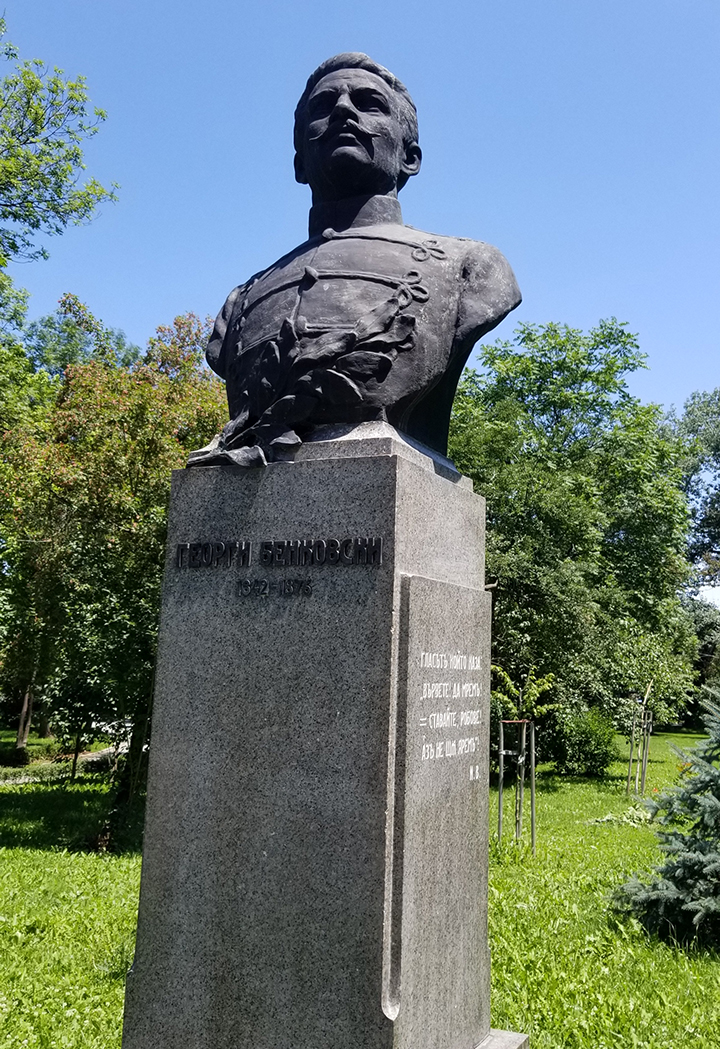
Monument to Georgi Benkovski in Sofia

== Bibliography ==
- Harris, David (1939). Britain and the Bulgarian horrors of 1876. Chicago: University of Chicago Press. pp. 15–17. hdl:2027/uc1.b3945523.
- Бакалов, Георги; Милен Куманов (2003). "БЕНКОВСКИ, Георги (истинско име: Гаврил Груев Хлътев) (между 1841 и 1842-12.V.1876); "ХВЪРКОВАТА ЧЕТА" на Бенковски". Електронно издание "История на България" (in Bulgarian). София: Труд, Сирма. ISBN 954528613X.
- "Георги Бенковски" (in Bulgarian). Копривщица.
- Георги Бенковски — буен красавец с мистичен ореол [Georgi Benkovski — Spirited beauty with mystical aura] (in Bulgarian). Е-нциклопедия. 2006-04-20. Archived from the original on 2007-12-08.
