= Golyam Izvor, Lovech Province =

Golyam izvor Голям извор
- Village
- Location within Bulgaria
- Coordinates: 42.9500°N 24.1000°E
- Country: Bulgaria
- Province: Lovech Province
- Municipality: Teteven

Area
  - Total: 32.031 km^{2} (12.367 sq mi)
- Elevation: 438 m (1,437 ft)

Population (2020-06-15)
  - Total: 489
- Time zone: UTC+2 (EET)
  - Summer (DST): UTC+3 (EEST)
- Post code: 5741
- Area code: 06998

Golyam izvor is a village in Teteven Municipality, Lovech Province, northern Bulgaria.
