= Gradezhnitsa =

Gradezhnitsa Градежница
- Village
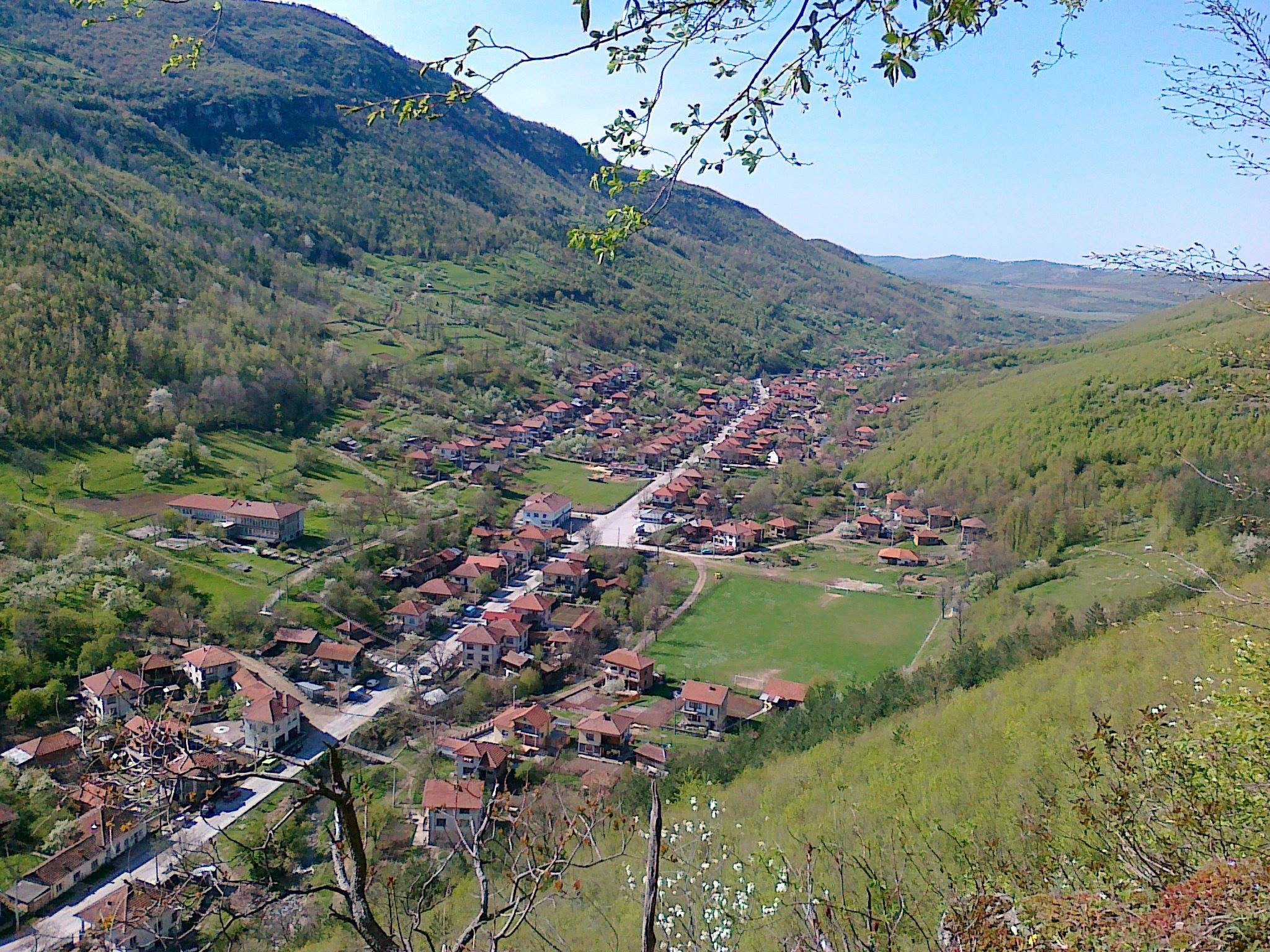
- The center of the village seen from above.

- Location within Bulgaria
- Coordinates: 43.0167°N 24.2333°E
- Country: Bulgaria
- Province: Lovech Province
- Municipality: Teteven
- Time zone: UTC+2 (EET)
  - Summer (DST): UTC+3 (EEST)

Gradezhnitsa is a village in Teteven Municipality, Lovech Province, northern Bulgaria.
