= Teteven =

Teteven Тетевен
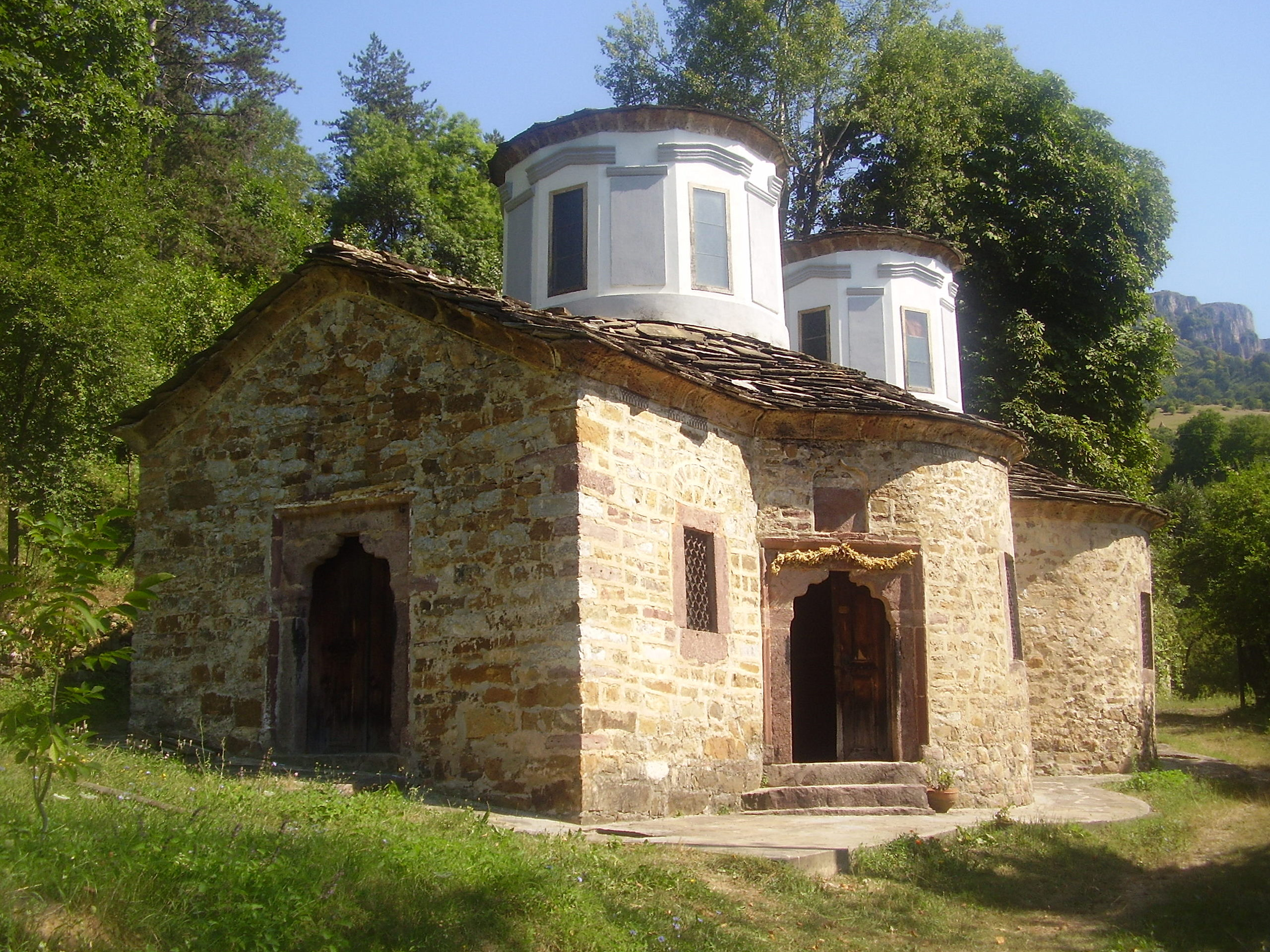
- Teteven Monastery of St Elias (17th century)

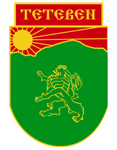
- Coat of arms

- Location of Teteven
- Coordinates: 42°55′4.71″N 24°15′49.91″E
- Country: Bulgaria
- Province (Oblast): Lovech

Government
  - Mayor: Dr. Madlena Boyadzhieva
- Elevation: 412 m (1,352 ft)

Population (15.12.2010)
  - City: 10,733
  - Urban: 21,374
- Time zone: UTC+2 (EET)
  - Summer (DST): UTC+3 (EEST)
- Postal Code: 5700
- Area code: 0678

Teteven (Bulgarian: Тетевен, pronounced [ˈtɛtɛvɛn]) is a town on the banks of the Vit, at the foot of the Balkan mountains in north central Bulgaria. It is the administrative centre of the Teteven Municipality which is a part of Lovech Province. As of December 2010, the town had a population of 10,733.

== Geography ==
Teteven is located in a mountainous area, in the foothills of the Balkan mountains between the peaks Ostrich, Petrahilya, Cherven, Treskavets and Vezhen. The river Vit meanders through the town. The altitude of Teteven district varies from 340 to 2100 m, and in the town center it is 415 m. The climate is temperate continental with cold winters and cool summers. The territory of Teteven is about 697 km^{2}, which is 16.86% of the territory of Lovech district.

== History ==
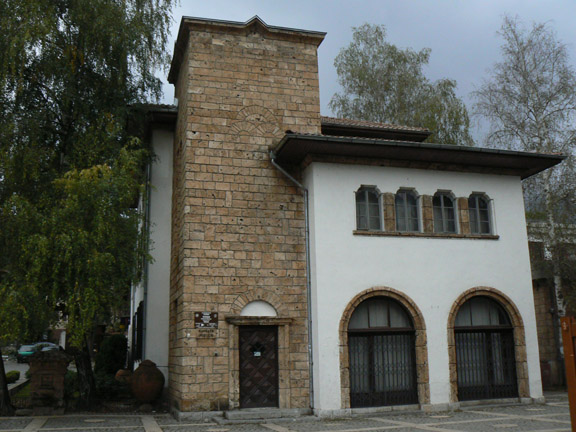
Teteven Historical Museum

The town was first mentioned in a written document in 1421. It is thought that the town's name comes from the family of a certain Tetyo (Tetyov rod), who settled in the area and founded the town. Older variants of the town's name found in documents are Tetyuven and Tetyuvene.

A thriving city in the 16th and 17th centuries, Teteven was raided by organised Turkish brigand groups in 1801, burnt down and almost completely destroyed, with only four houses surviving out of a total of 3,000. The town later revived and was active in the armed struggle for Bulgarian independence in the 19th century, sheltering a revolutionary committee part of Vasil Levski's organised rebel network.

Each summer a large chess tournament, one of the biggest events in Bulgaria's chess calendar, is held in Teteven.

== Honour ==
Teteven Glacier on Livingston Island in the South Shetland Islands, Antarctica is named after Teteven.

== Sights ==
Teteven combines the beauty of the surrounding scenery with the towering hills and peaks Petrahilya, Ostrich, Cherven and Ravni Kamak, the cool breeze of the Vit river, and the spirit of centuries past, hovering in the multitude of monuments, ancient Bulgarian architecture, and customs and manners that have remained intact in time. Astounded by the sights revealed before him in his visit to the town, Ivan Vazov exclaimed: "Had I not come to Teteven, I would have remained a foreigner to mother Bulgaria ... I have been wandering, I have been rambling, but I have not seen a more wondrous paradise."

There is a historical museum in Teteven, which is among the Hundred National Tourist Sites of the Bulgarian Tourist Union.

=== Sights of Teteven and the Teteven district ===
- Glozhene Monastery
- Saint Elijah Monastery (14th century)
- All Saints Church
- Kosnitza waterfall
- Mother of God Shroud Chapel on Ostrich peak
- Boev hill

=== Caves ===
- Saeva Dupka
- Morovitza
- Baiovitza
- Draganchovitza
- Rushova cave (near Gradezhnitza village)

=== Museums ===
- Teteven Historical Museum
- Bobevska house museum
- Hadzhiivanova house museum
- Yorgova house museum

== Regular events ==
- Autumn fair
- Northern Song Feast (May)
- The Feast of Teteven on November 1, the day the town was liberated from Ottoman domination in 1877
- Days of Mountain Water and Healing Tourism, Scientific Research Center of Medical Biophysics, Teteven municipality, June 11

== Gallery ==
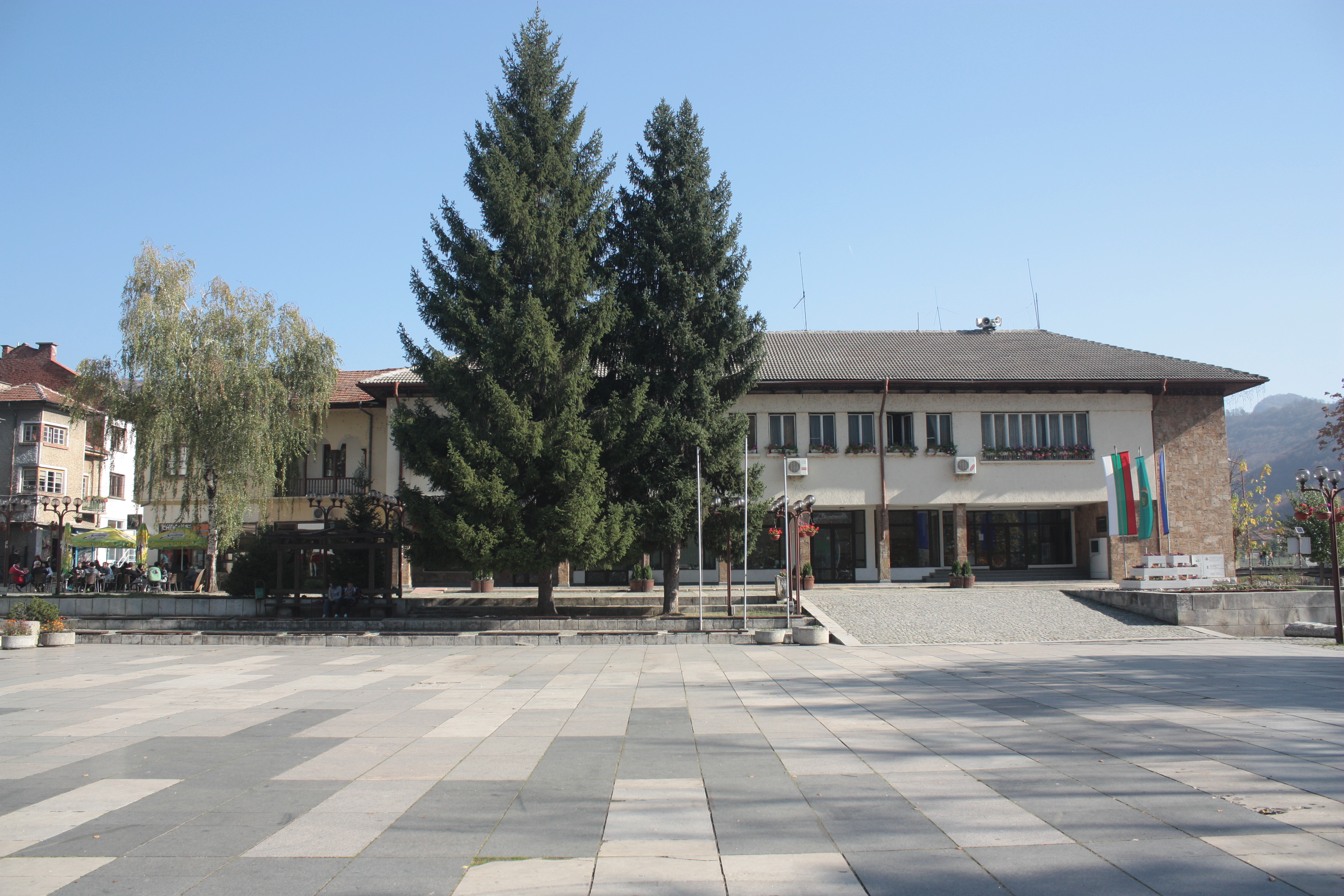
Teteven Municipality Hall

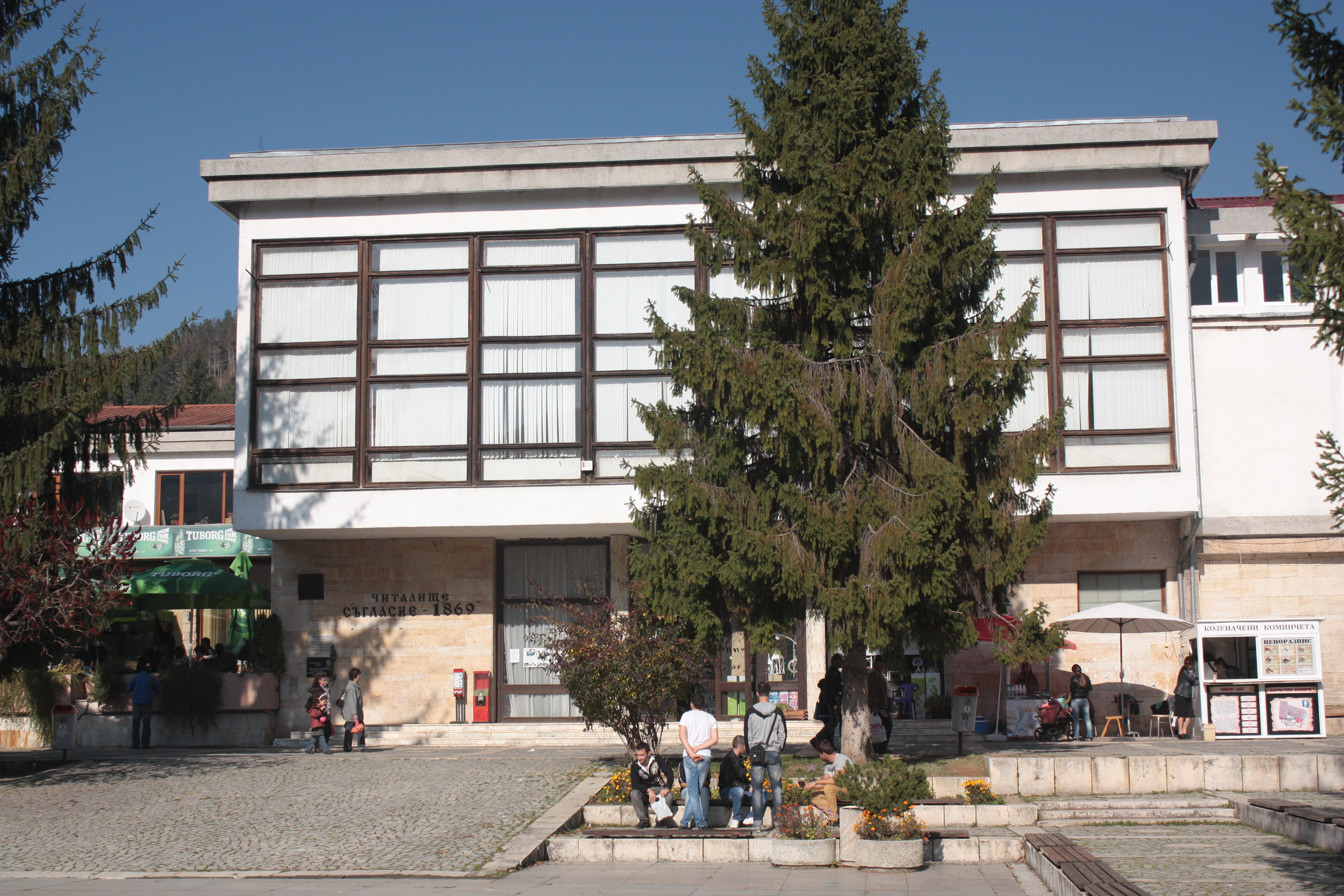
Teteven Chitalishte (Culture club)

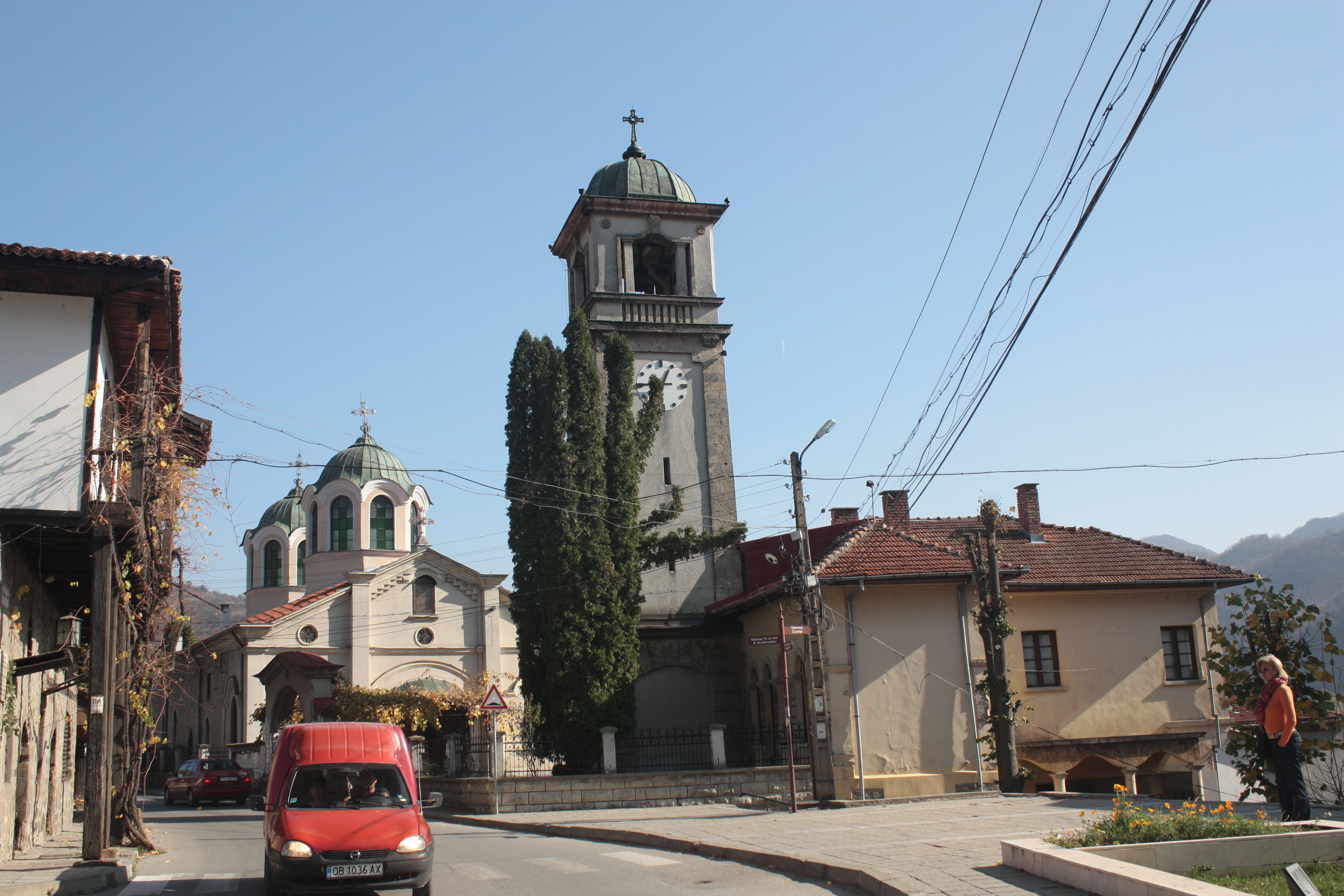
All Saints Church in Teteven

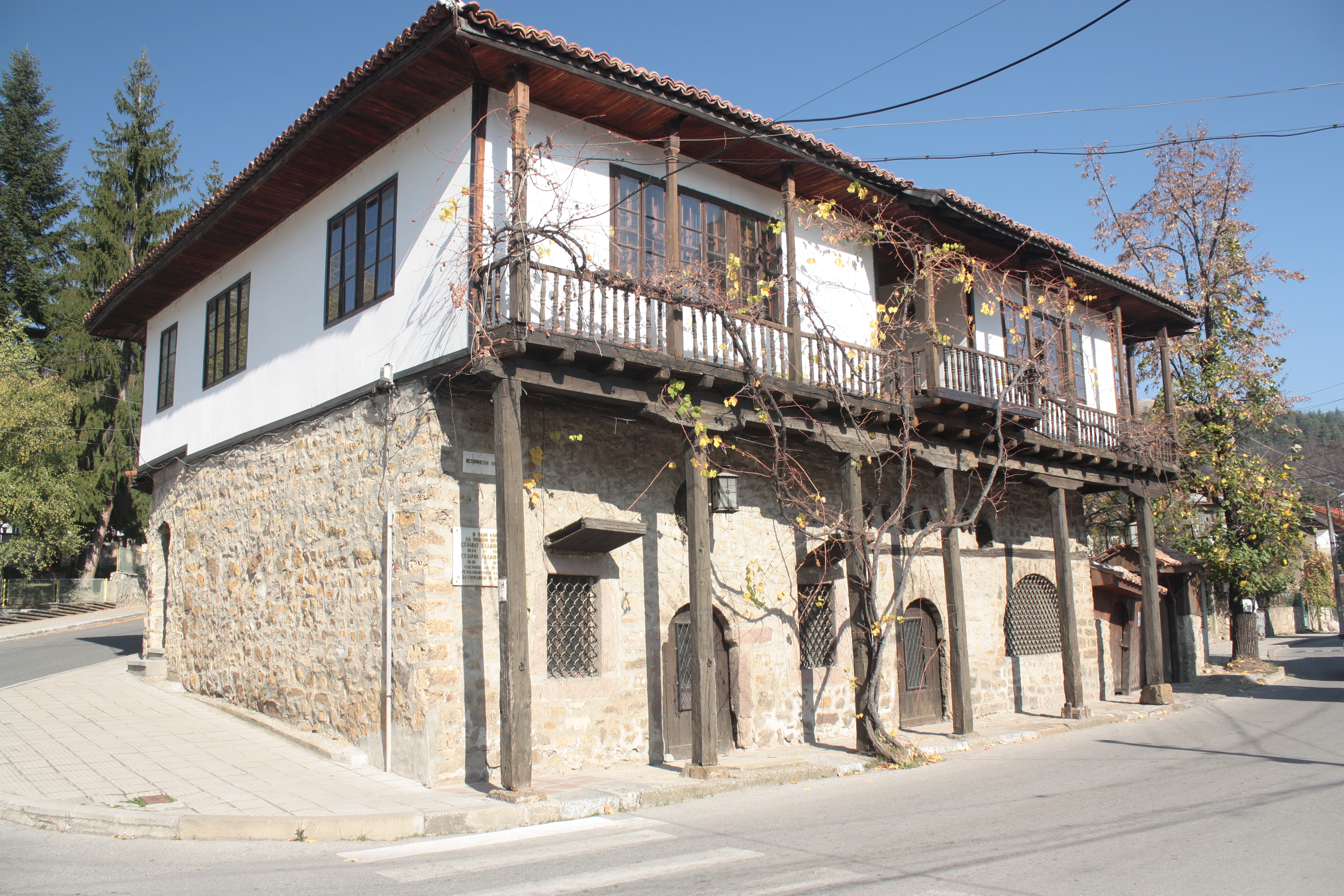
A 19th-century house

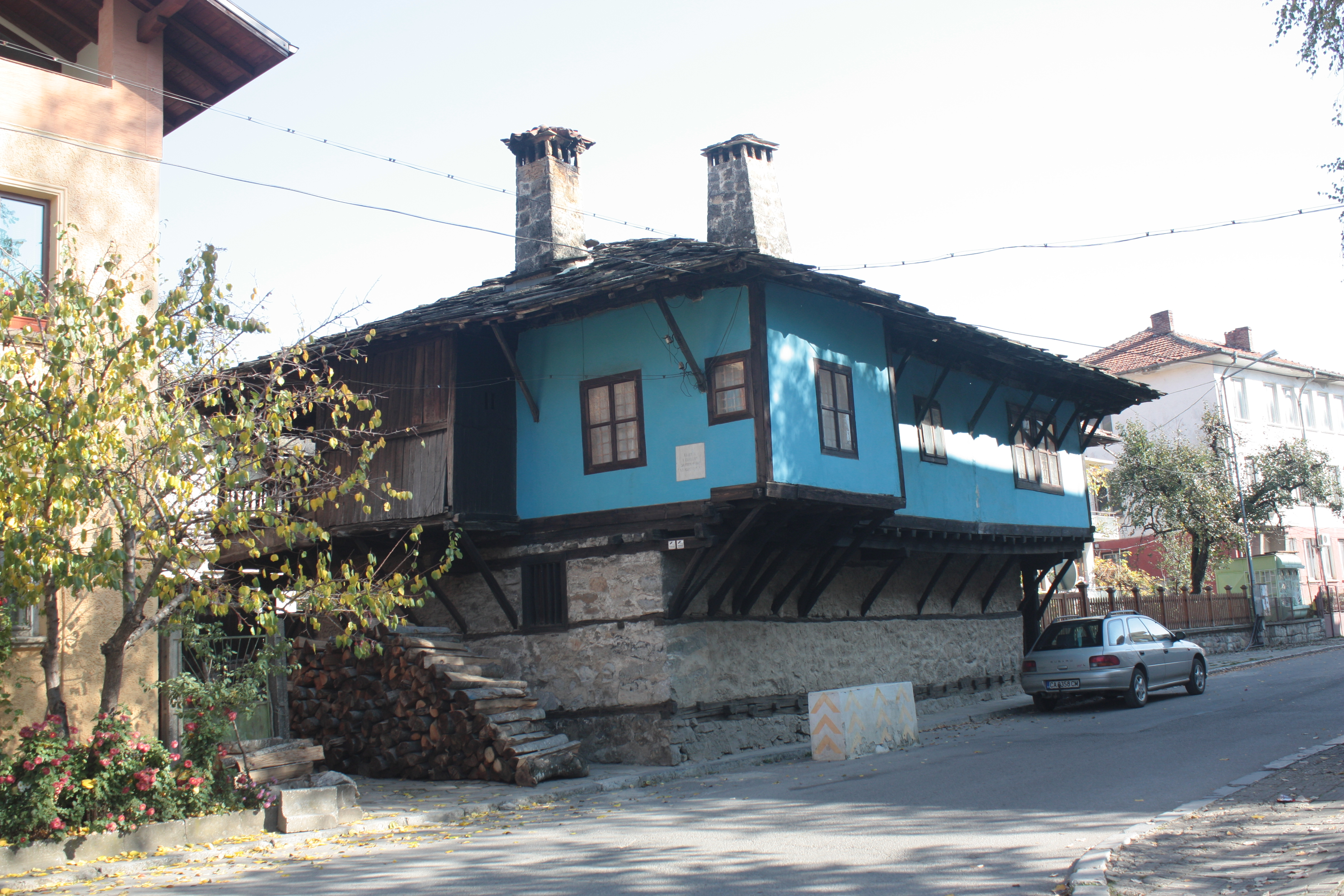
A 19th-century house

== Persons ==
=== Notable persons born in Teteven ===
- Usin Kerim — poet
- Svilen Rusinov — sportsman, honorary citizen of Teteven

=== Notable persons who have died in Teteven ===
- Georgi Benkovski (1843–1876) — Bulgarian revolutionary

== See also ==
- Lovech
- Lukovit
- Petrevene
