= Metodi Stoynev =

Bulgarian footballer

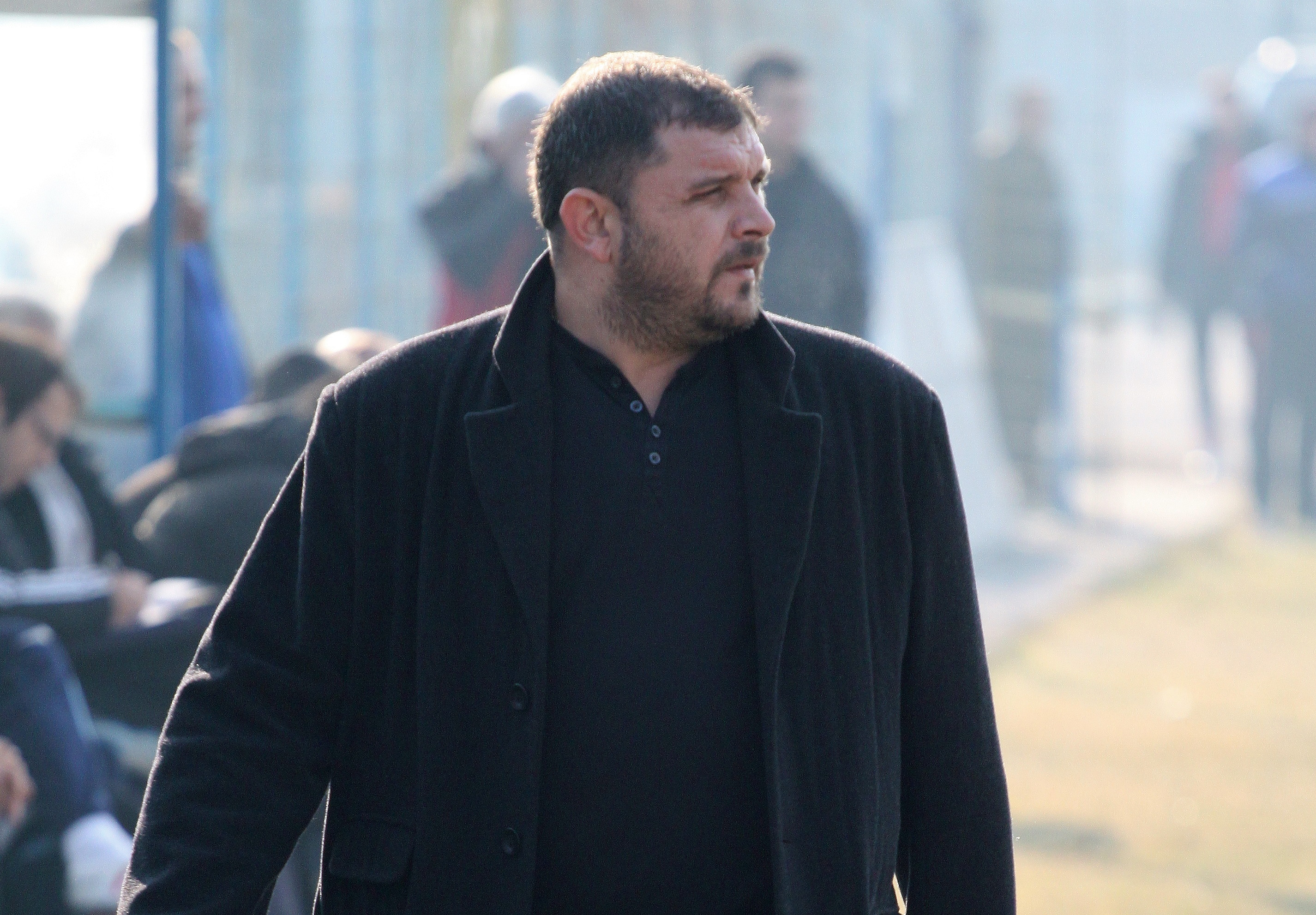
- Stoynev in 2011

Personal information
- Full name: Metodi Ivanov Stoynev
- Date of birth: 15 October 1973 (age 53)
- Place of birth: Poleto, Bulgaria
- Height: 1.82 m (6 ft 0 in)
- Position: Forward

Senior career*
Years	Team	Apps	(Gls)
1993–1994	Bansko	18	(6)
1994–1995	Pirin Gotse Delchev	20	(7)
1995–1997	Pirin Blagoevgrad	45	(15)
1997–1998	Dobrudzha Dobrich	15	(6)
1998–2000	Litex Lovech	16	(2)
1999	→ Dobrudzha Dobrich (loan)	12	(3)
2000	→ Spartak Varna (loan)	8	(2)
2000–2001	Velbazhd Kyustendil	23	(7)
2001–2002	Lokomotiv Plovdiv	43	(19)
2003	Liaoning Whowin		
2003	Shaanxi Zhongjian		
2003–2005	Lokomotiv Plovdiv	63	(15)
2006	Vihren Sandanski	13	(5)
2006	Velbazhd Kyustendil	10	(4)
2007–2008	Rodopa Smolyan	4	(0)
2008–2010	Septemvri Simitli		
- * Club domestic league appearances and goals

Metodi Stoynev (Bulgarian: Методи Стойнев; born 15 October 1973) is a Bulgarian former professional footballer who played as a forward.

== Honours ==
Lokomotiv Plovdiv

- A Group: 2003–04
- Bulgarian Supercup: 2004
