= Radostin Kishishev =

Bulgarian footballer (born 1974)

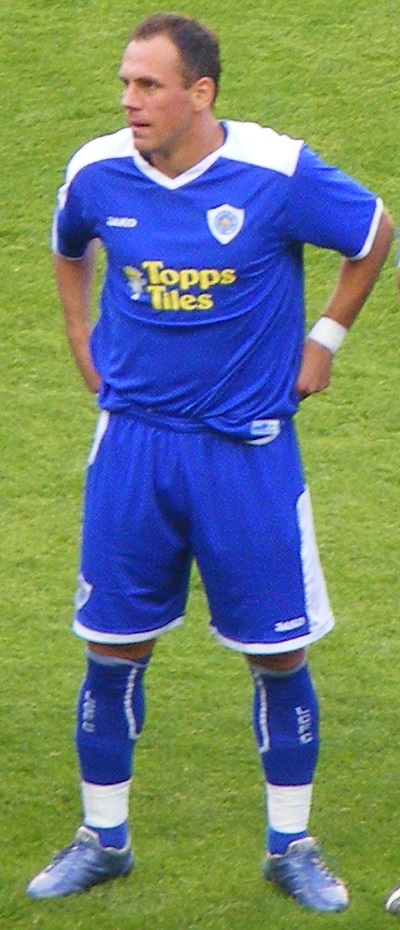
- Kishishev playing for Leicester City in 2008

Personal information
- Full name: Radostin Prodanov Kishishev
- Date of birth: 30 July 1974 (age 52)
- Place of birth: Burgas, Bulgaria
- Height: 1.78 m (5 ft 10 in)
- Positions: Right-back; defensive midfielder

Team information
- Current team: Chernomorets 1919 (director of youth/U19 coach)

Senior career*
Years	Team	Apps	(Gls)
1991–1994	Chernomorets Burgas	52	(4)
1994–1997	Naftex Burgas	75	(6)
1997–1998	Bursaspor	20	(3)
1998–2000	Litex Lovech	45	(4)
2000–2007	Charlton Athletic	179	(2)
2007	→ Leeds United (loan)	10	(0)
2007–2008	Leicester City	7	(0)
2007–2008	→ Leeds United (loan)	7	(0)
2008–2010	Litex Lovech	34	(1)
2010–2011	Brighton & Hove Albion	32	(0)
2011–2012	Chernomorets Burgas	19	(0)
Total		481	(20)

International career
1996–2009	Bulgaria	88	(1)

Managerial career
- 2012–2014: Chernomorets Burgas (director of football)
- 2014–2015: Vereya
- 2015: PFC Burgas
- 2015: Neftochimic Burgas
- 2018–2019: Chernomorets Burgas
- * Club domestic league appearances and goals

Radostin Prodanov Kishishev (Bulgarian: Радостин Проданов Кишишев; born 30 July 1974) is a Bulgarian former professional footballer who works as director of youth/U19 coach of Chernomorets 1919.

Kishishev earned 88 caps for Bulgaria, representing them at Euro 96 and the 1998 FIFA World Cup.

== Club career ==
Kishishev, born in the Bulgarian city of Burgas, began his career with local sides Chernomorets Burgas and Neftochimic Burgas. He then played as a central midfielder in Turkish side Bursaspor between 1997–98 with another Bulgarian footballer, Kostadin Vidolov. He returned to Bulgaria with Litex Lovech, and won the Bulgarian league title with them in 1998 and 1999. During the 1997-98 A PFG season, he was found to have been ineligible for two of Litex's games - an away fixture against PFC Velbazhd Kyustendil and a home one vs. Levski Sofia - due to not being properly registered following his transfer from Bursaspor, but despite suffering 3-0 default losses, the team from Lovech won their first title.

=== Charlton Athletic ===
In the summer of 2000 Kishishev was purchased by newly promoted English Premier League side Charlton Athletic. Initially utilised as a right back, manager Alan Curbishley moved him into the midfield position where Kishishev would establish himself in the team. An almost constant presence throughout most of Charlton's seven-year spell in the Premier League, he had a reputation as a hard worker, a warrior and often topped the team on the distance he ran during games, as shown by the Pro Zone statistics system. Kishishev scored two goals during his time at Charlton, with both coming in the 2002/03 season. He netted in games against West Ham, which made him a local hero, and Everton.

=== Leeds United loan spell ===
After Curbishley left The Valley in 2006, Kishishev's appearances in the first team began to wane. He made his last appearance for Charlton in January 2007, after which he was loaned out to struggling Championship side Leeds United. Kishishev impressed many in his short time at Leeds, and got man of the match on his debut which was a 3–2 defeat against Sheffield Wednesday. His arrival at Elland Road coincided with Leeds' best run of results in the season, but it was too late to save the club from relegation to League One. Leeds wanted to sign Kishishev permanently in the summer but after they were placed into administration a transfer embargo was placed upon them meaning Kishishev had to look elsewhere.

=== Leicester City ===
Out of contract, Kishishev joined Leicester City of the Championship in June 2007 on a free transfer, signing a two-year contract. A succession of managerial changes, however, meant he was considered surplus to requirements at the Walkers Stadium. In all, he made seven league appearances for Leicester as they were relegated at the end of the season. Kishishev was retained by incoming manager Nigel Pearson for the first half of the 2008–09 season, acting as a translator for teammate and fellow countryman Aleksandar Tunchev, and inheriting the number 7 shirt worn by outgoing Iain Hume. On 19 December 2008, Kishishev's contract was cancelled by mutual consent having only played one game.

=== Return to Leeds ===
He was loaned out again to Leeds, Kishishev got an injury very early in his loan, so missed several games, and when he played he struggled for fitness and did not impress like he did in his first loan spell. Manager Dennis Wise's departure in early 2008 ended his second spell at Elland Road with Leeds deciding not to renew his loan spell.

=== Litex Lovech ===
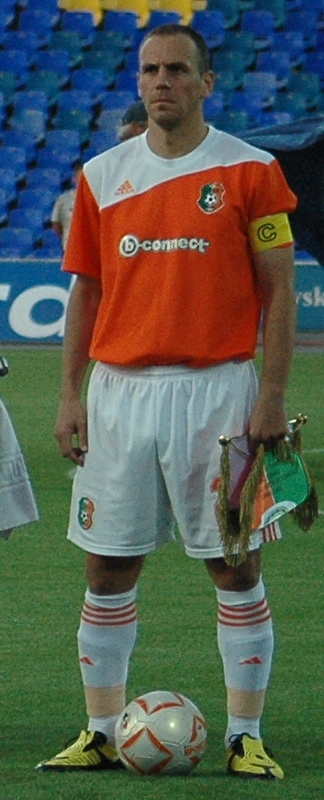
Kishishev playing for Litex Lovech in 2009

After returning to the Bulgarian team from Lovech, Kishishev quickly established himself as a first choice defender at his former club and captained the team on a number of occasions. On 25 November 2009, he was sent off in the 2–2 away draw against Levski Sofia after an altercation with Brazilian midfielder Zé Soares.

=== Brighton & Hove Albion ===
On 16 July 2010, it was announced that Kishishev had signed a one-year contract with Brighton & Hove Albion. Kishishev then made his Brighton debut in Brighton's opening day of the season 2–1 win over Swindon Town.

In May 2011 the club announced that he would be released at the end of the season following the ending of his current contract, along with five other players.

=== Chernomorets Burgas ===
In July 2011 Kishishev announced that he wanted to end his career in his hometown club Chernomorets Burgas. He decided to retire at the end of the season. From 20 November 2012 until May 2014 he was director of football in Chernomorets Burgas.

== International career ==
Kishishev made his debut for the Bulgaria national team in 1996 and participated in UEFA Euro 1996 in the same year. He appeared in Bulgaria's group-stage matches against Spain and the Romania, with Bulgaria finishing the group stage with one win, one draw, and one loss. He continued to make regular appearances during the 1998 FIFA World Cup qualifiers, contributing to Bulgaria's qualification for the tournament.

Kishishev started all three of Bulgaria's group-stage matches at the 1998 FIFA World Cup. In the opening match against the Paraguay, Bulgaria drew 0–0, before losing 0–1 to Nigeria and 1–6 to Spain, resulting in Bulgaria's elimination in the group stage. Kishishev played the full 90 minutes in all three matches.

Kishishev continued to play as a regular first-team player for the national team and remained with the side until 2009. On 5 September 2009, he scored his only international goal in a 2010 FIFA World Cup qualifying match against the Montenegro, as Bulgaria won 4–1 at home.

Kishishev ended his international career on 9 September 2009, in a match against the Italy. He made 88 appearances and scored one goal for the Bulgaria national team.

=== International goals ===
Scores and results list Bulgaria's goal tally first, score column indicates score after Kishishev goal.

International goal scored by Radostin Kishishev
No.	Date	Venue	Opponent	Score	Result	Competition
1	5 September 2009	Sofia, Bulgaria	Montenegro	1-1	4–1	FIFA World Cup 2010 Qualification

== Managerial career ==
Between October 2014 and March 2015, Kishishev managed Vereya. In August 2023, he was appointed as operational manager at Botev Plovdiv.

== Honours ==
Litex Lovech

- Bulgarian A Professional Football Group: 1997–98, 1998–99, 2009–10
- Bulgarian Cup: 2009

Brighton & Hove Albion

- Football League One: 2010–11
