= Glozhene Monastery =

Coordinates: 42°58′30″N 24°10′12″E

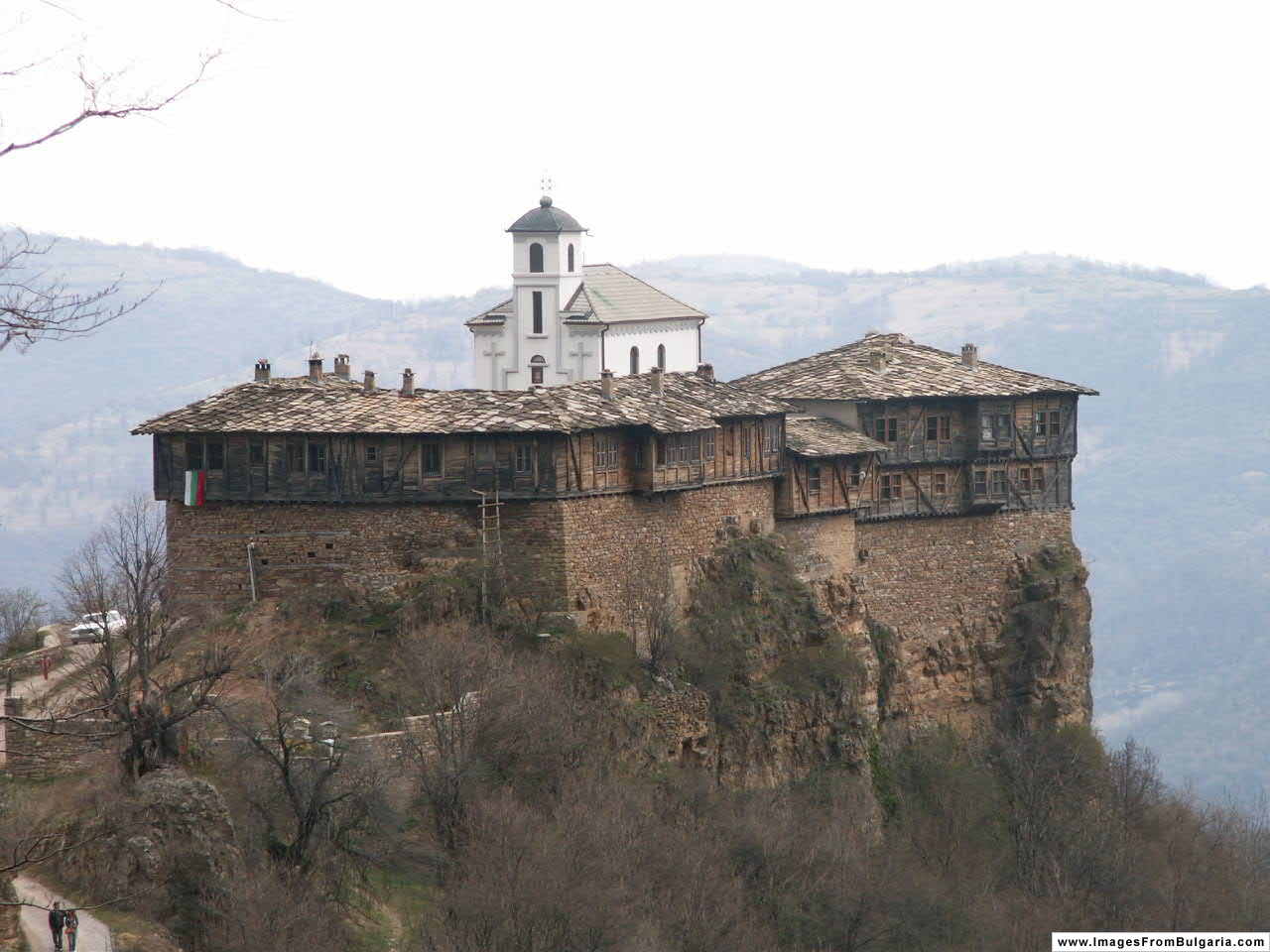
The Glozhene Monastery from the outside

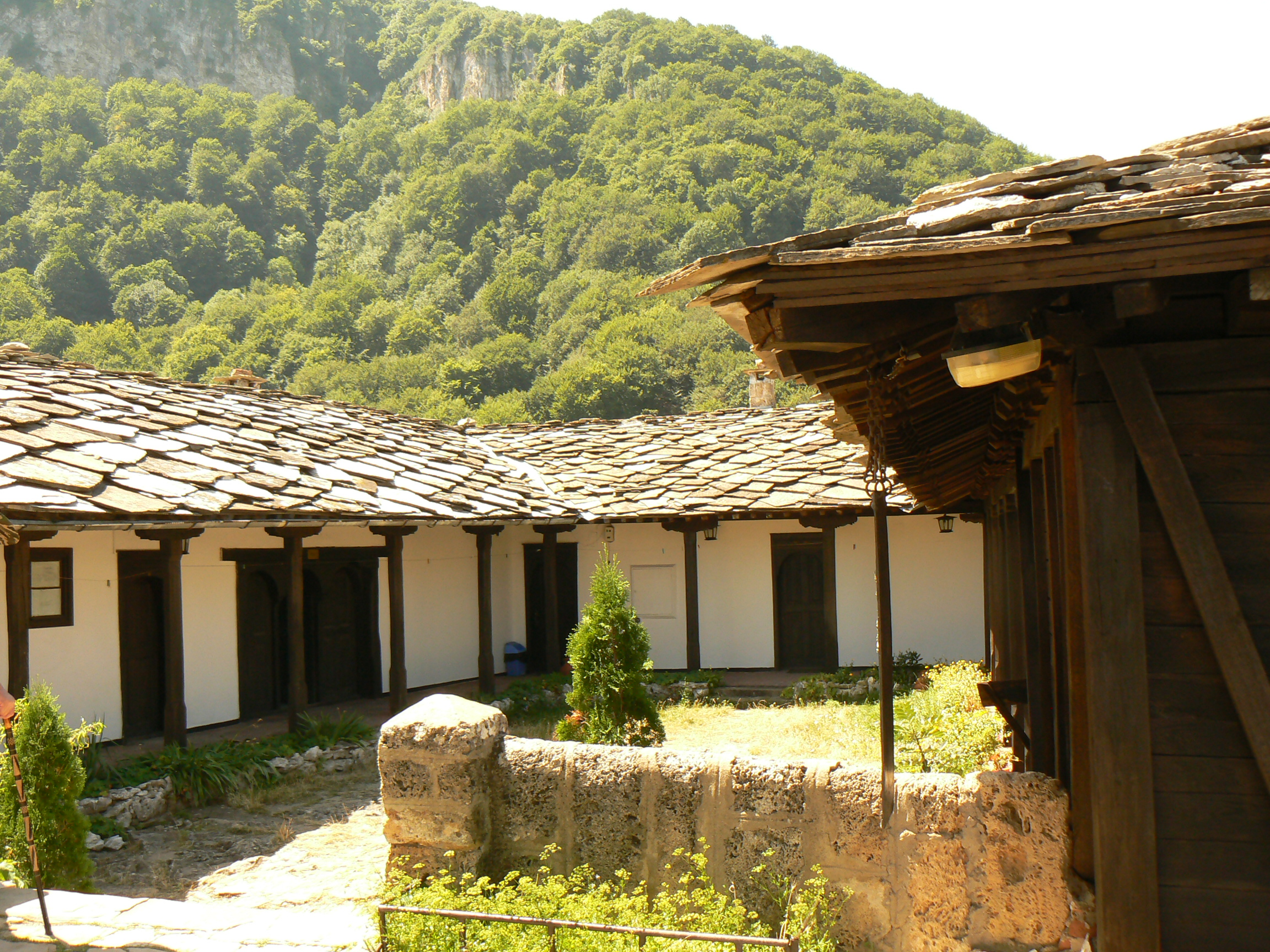
Some of the buildings of the monastery

The Glozhene Monastery (Bulgarian: Гложенски манастир [ˈɡɫɔʒɛnski manɐsˈtir]) is an Eastern Orthodox monastery located on the northern slopes of Stara Planina in Bulgaria, near the village of Glozhene and the Cherni Vit river, 12 km from Teteven.

== History ==
According to the legend, the monastery was built in the 13th century (1224), when Kievan Rus knyaz Georgi Glozh settled in the area with Ivan Asen II's approval. The knyaz founded a monastery carrying the name of St George, whose icon he had brought with himself. The icon then disappeared numerous times only to be found on a hill not far from the village of Glozhene, which was interpreted by the monks as a divine sign to move the monastery there. This was eventually done near the end of the 14th century. The two monasteries existed in parallel for a short time, being connected by a tunnel to each other, but the tunnel, used many times by Vasil Levski during his secret missions, was destroyed by an earthquake in 1928.

The monastery church was erected after the creation of the monastery in the 14th century, but was destroyed by another earthquake in 1913 along with its frescoes. The modern church was constructed in 1951 on the grounds of the old one.

== Honour ==
Glozhene Cove in Smith Island, South Shetland Islands is named after the settlement and the monastery of Glozhene.
