= Malka Zhelyazna =

Malka Zhelyazna Малка Желязна
- Village
- Location within Bulgaria
- Coordinates: 43.0000°N 24.3167°E
- Country: Bulgaria
- Province: Lovech Province
- Municipality: Teteven
- Time zone: UTC+2 (EET)
  - Summer (DST): UTC+3 (EEST)

Malka Zhelyazna is a village in Teteven Municipality, Lovech Province, northern Bulgaria.
