= Cherni Vit =

Village in Lovech Province, Bulgaria

Coordinates: 42°53′N 24°12′E

Cherni Vit (Bulgarian: Черни Вит, "Black Vit") is a village in Teteven Municipality, Lovech Province, north-central Bulgaria. The village is known for its local kind of green cheese, also known as Cherni Vit cheese.
