= Galata, Lovech Province =

Galata Галата
- Village
- Location within Bulgaria
- Coordinates: 43.0167°N 24.2833°E
- Country: Bulgaria
- Province: Lovech Province
- Municipality: Teteven
- Time zone: UTC+2 (EET)
  - Summer (DST): UTC+3 (EEST)

Galata is a village in Teteven Municipality, Lovech Province, northern Bulgaria.
