= Teteven Municipality =

Teteven Municipality Община Тетевен
- Municipality
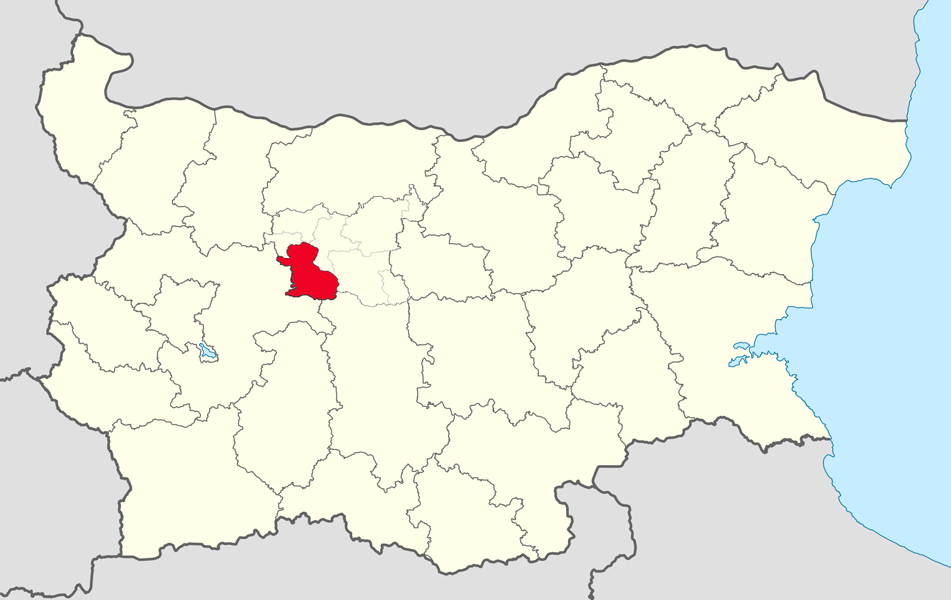
- Teteven Municipality within Bulgaria and Lovech Province.
- Coordinates: 42°52′N 24°17′E
- Country: Bulgaria
- Province (Oblast): Lovech
- Admin. centre (Obshtinski tsentar): Teteven

Area
  - Total: 697 km^{2} (269 sq mi)

Population (December 2009)
  - Total: 22,016
  - Density: 31.6/km^{2} (81.8/sq mi)
- Time zone: UTC+2 (EET)
  - Summer (DST): UTC+3 (EEST)

Teteven Municipality (Bulgarian: Община Тетевен) is a municipality (obshtina) in Lovech Province, Central-North Bulgaria, located from the northern slopes of the central Stara planina mountain to the area of the Fore-Balkan. It is named after its administrative centre - the town of Teteven.

The municipality embraces a territory of 697 km^{2} (269 sq mi) with a population of 22,016 inhabitants, as of December 2009.

The main road E772 crosses the area through the northernmost parts of the municipality.

== Settlements ==
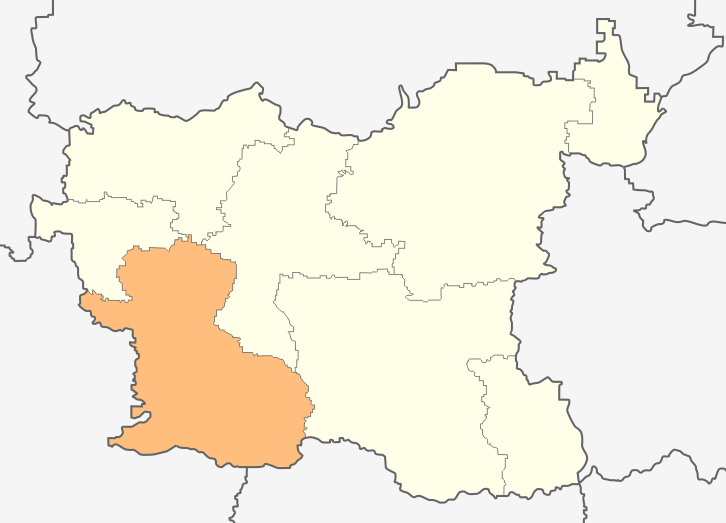
Teteven Municipality within Lovech Province

Teteven Municipality includes the following 13 places (towns are shown in bold):

| Town/Village | Cyrillic | Population (December 2009) |
|---|---|---|
| **Teteven** | **Тетевен** | 10,613 |
| Babintsi | Бабинци | 272 |
| Balgarski Izvor | Български извор | 1,304 |
| Cherni Vit | Черни Вит | 722 |
| Divchovoto | Дивчовото | 187 |
| Galata | Галата | 2,532 |
| Glogovo | Глогово | 1,472 |
| Glozhene | Гложене | 1,059 |
| Golyam Izvor | Голям извор | 529 |
| Gradezhnitsa | Градежница | 1,789 |
| Malka Zhelyazna | Малка Желязна | 144 |
| Ribaritsa | Рибарица | 1,137 |
| Vasilyovo | Васильово | 256 |
| Total | | 22,016 |

== Demography ==
The following table shows the change of the population during the last four decades.

Teteven Municipality
| **Year** | 1975 | 1985 | 1992 | **2001** | 2005 | 2007 | 2009 | **2011** |
| **Population** | 26,661 | 26,689 | 25,952 | 23,768 | 22,715 | 22,266 | 22,016 | ... |
Sources: Census 2001, Census 2011, „pop-stat.mashke.org“,

=== Religion ===
According to the latest Bulgarian census of 2011, the religious composition, among those who answered the optional question on religious identification, was the following:

Religious composition of Teteven Municipality
| Orthodox Christianity | 62.6% |
| Catholicism | 0.4% |
| Protestantism | 0.3% |
| Islam | 2.4% |
| No religion | 17.1% |
| Prefer not to answer, others and aindefinable | 17.2% |

== See also ==
- Provinces of Bulgaria
- Municipalities of Bulgaria
- List of cities and towns in Bulgaria
