= Petar Kushev =

Bulgarian footballer (born 1971)

Personal information
- Date of birth: 21 January 1971 (age 55)
- Place of birth: Bulgaria
- Height: 1.86 m (6 ft 1 in)
- Position: Defender

Petar Kushev (Bulgarian: Петър Кушев; born 21 January 1971) is a Bulgarian former professional footballer who played as a defender.

== Biography ==
In his career, Kushev represented FC Kremikovtzi, Septemvri Sofia, Litex Lovech, Dobrudzha Dobrich, SG Wattenscheid 09, KFC Uerdingen 05, Rot-Weiß Erfurt, SC Paderborn, and SV Lippstadt. Kushev is also a player's agent.

He was involved in a kidnapping of his own son in December 2006.
