= Dimitar Karadaliev =

Bulgarian footballer

Personal information
- Full name: Dimitar Angelov Karadaliev
- Date of birth: 29 April 1971 (age 55)
- Place of birth: Petrich, Bulgaria
- Height: 1.80 m (5 ft 11 in)
- Position: Defender

Senior career*
Years	Team	Apps	(Gls)
1990–1993	Belasitsa Petrich	71	(7)
1993–2002	Litex Lovech	155	(12)
2001	→ Cherno More (loan)	2	(0)
2003	Belasitsa Petrich	4	(0)
Total		232	(19)
- * Club domestic league appearances and goals

Dimitar Karadaliev (Bulgarian: Димитър Карадалиев; born 29 April 1971) is a former Bulgarian professional footballer who played as a defender.

== Career ==
He spent his entire career in Bulgaria, playing for almost a full decade for Litex Lovech, winning two national championships in 1998 and 1999. Karadaliev was also part of the Lovech team that finished in second place during the 2001/2002 A PFG season. Following his retirement, he turned to business.
