= Ribaritsa, Lovech Province =

Ribaritsa Рибарица
- Village
- Location in Bulgaria
- Coordinates: 42.846°N 24.361°E
- Country: Bulgaria
- Province: Lovech
- Municipality: Teteven
- Elevation: 701 m (2,300 ft)

Population (2016-03-15)
  - Total: 1,029
- Postal code: 5720

Ribaritsa (Bulgarian: Рибарица, also transliterated Ribarica, Ribaritza) is a village in Teteven Municipality, Lovech Province. It lies at the foot of the Teteven Balkan Mountains, on the banks of the Beli Vit river, 12 kilometres from Teteven, 74 kilometres southwest of Lovech and 138 kilometres northeast of Sofia. Due to its mountainous location 701 metres above sea level, it is a popular mountain resort. As of 2015, it has a population of 1,064 and the mayor is Penka Ganeva (GERB)

The noted Bulgarian revolutionary Georgi Benkovski, a leader of the April Uprising, was killed by the Ottomans in the Kostina area near Ribaritsa in 1876. It was also the place where the famous general and mayor of Sofia Vladimir Vazov (brother of national writer Ivan Vazov) spent the last years of his life; he died there on 20 May 1945.

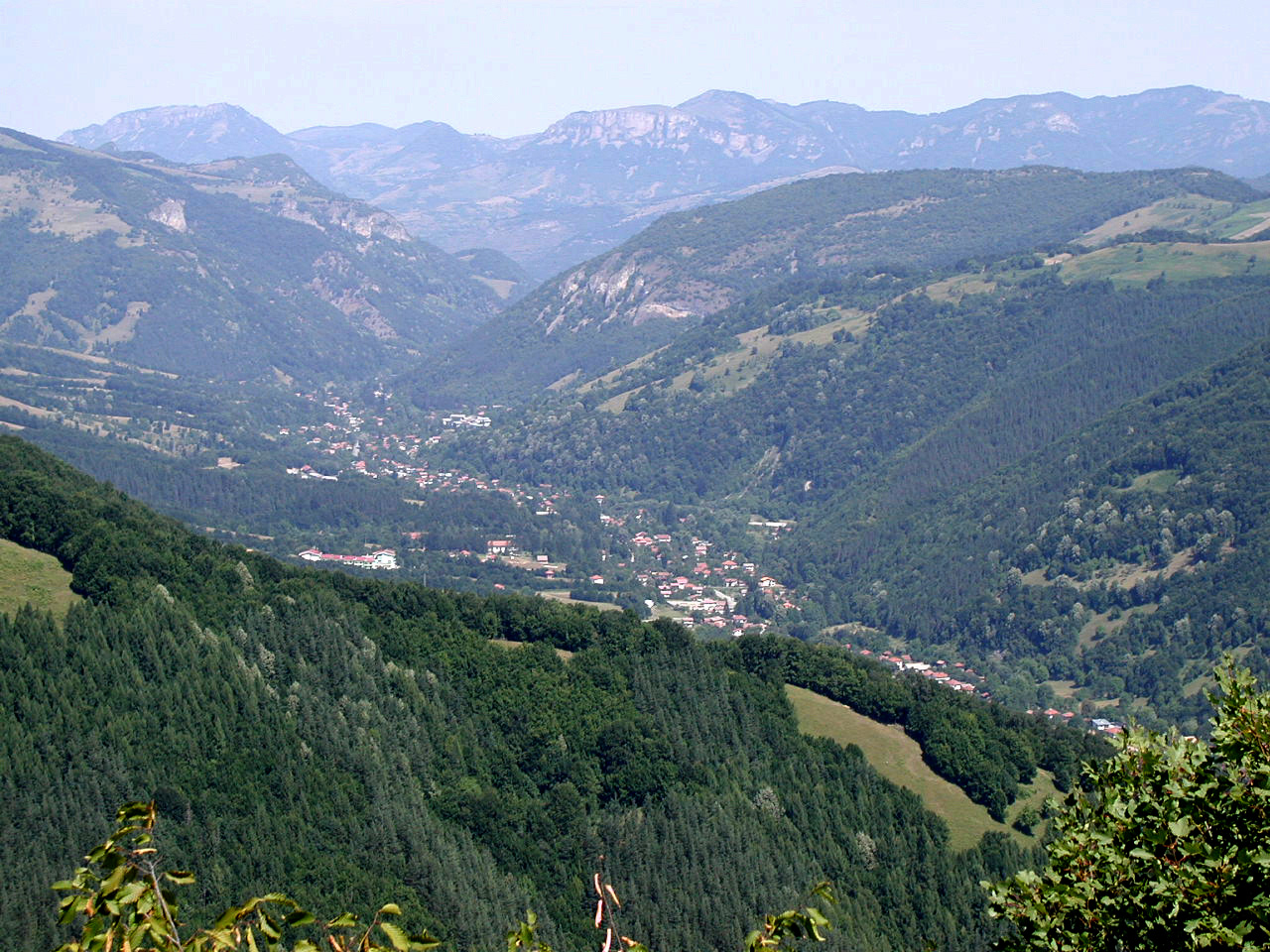
Overview of Ribaritsa

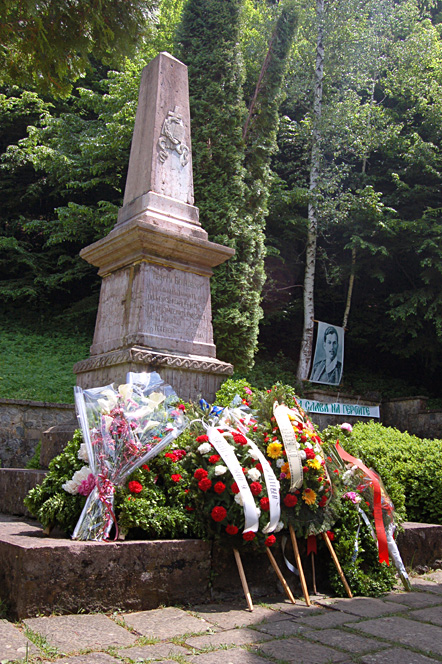
Monument to Georgi Benkovski in the Kostina area
