= Academy of the Ministry of Interior, in Sofia =

Coordinates: 42°37′53.7″N 23°22′14.6″E

The Academy of the Ministry of Interior (Bulgarian: Академия на Министерство на вътрешните работи) is a Bulgarian academy for government employees and employees of the Ministry of Interior.

== History ==
The academy was established on 5 July 1879. In 1889 was adopted the first law on the Bulgarian police forces. The first academic year for the police guard were started in 1907. In 1944 in Sofia started the first classes in the Public School for Policemen. In the next years such schools were established in Plovdiv and Burgas. In 1949 all three schools were merged into a Central School to the Ministry of Interior named after Georgi Dimitrov. Since 1991 the name was changed to Higher Institute for Officer Training and Research.

== Structure ==
The academy is managed by a General Assembly, an Academic audience and a Control audience.

- Faculty of Police
- Faculty of Fire secure
