= 1998–99 B Group =

Season of the Bulgarian B Football Group

Bulgarian B Group
- Season: 1998–99
- Champions: Chernomorets
- Promoted: Chernomorets; Belasitsa; Olimpik
- Relegated: Dimitrovgrad; Chardafon; Akademik; Olimpik-Hadzhi Dimitar
- Matches: 240
- Goals: 696 (2.9 per match)

The 1998–99 B Group was the 43rd season of the Bulgarian B Football Group, the second tier of the Bulgarian football league system. A total of 16 teams contested the league.

Chernomorets Burgas, Belasitsa Petrich and Olimpik Galata were promoted to Bulgarian A Group. Dimitrovgrad, Chardafon Gabrovo, Akademik Sofia and Olimpik-Hadzhi Dimitar Sliven were relegated.

== League table ==
Pos	Team	Pld	W	D	L	GF	GA	GD	Pts	Promotion or relegation
1	Chernomorets Burgas (P)	30	21	3	6	62	20	+42	66	Promotion to 1999–2000 A Group
2	Belasitsa Petrich (P)	30	20	2	8	60	27	+33	62	Promotion to 1999–2000 A Group
3	Olimpik Galata (P)	30	20	2	8	46	21	+25	62	Promotion to 1999–2000 A Group
4	Maritsa Plovdiv	30	19	4	7	64	25	+39	61	
5	Kremikovtsi	30	17	1	12	48	41	+7	52	
6	Antibiotic-Ludogorets Razgrad	30	14	4	12	46	35	+11	46	
7	Cherno More Varna	30	14	2	14	37	48	−11	44	
8	Botev Vratsa	30	12	4	14	50	42	+8	40	
9	Spartak Pleven	30	12	4	14	40	43	−3	40	
10	Haskovo	30	13	1	16	45	49	−4	40	
11	Svetkavitsa Targovishte	30	12	4	14	40	45	−5	40	
12	Etar Veliko Tarnovo	30	11	4	15	30	47	−17	37	
13	Dimitrovgrad (R)	30	11	1	18	36	57	−21	34	Relegation to 1999–2000 V Group
14	Chardafon Gabrovo (R)	30	10	4	16	33	56	−23	34	Relegation to 1999–2000 V Group
15	Akademik Sofia (R)	30	6	6	18	22	49	−27	24	Relegation to 1999–2000 V Group
16	Olimpik-Hadzhi Dimitar Sliven (R)	30	4	2	24	37	91	−54	14	Relegation to 1999–2000 V Group

Source: rsssf.com
Rules for classification: 1) points; 2) goal difference; 3) number of goals scored.
(P) Promoted; (R) Relegated
