= Glozhene, Lovech Province =

Glozhene Гложене
- Village
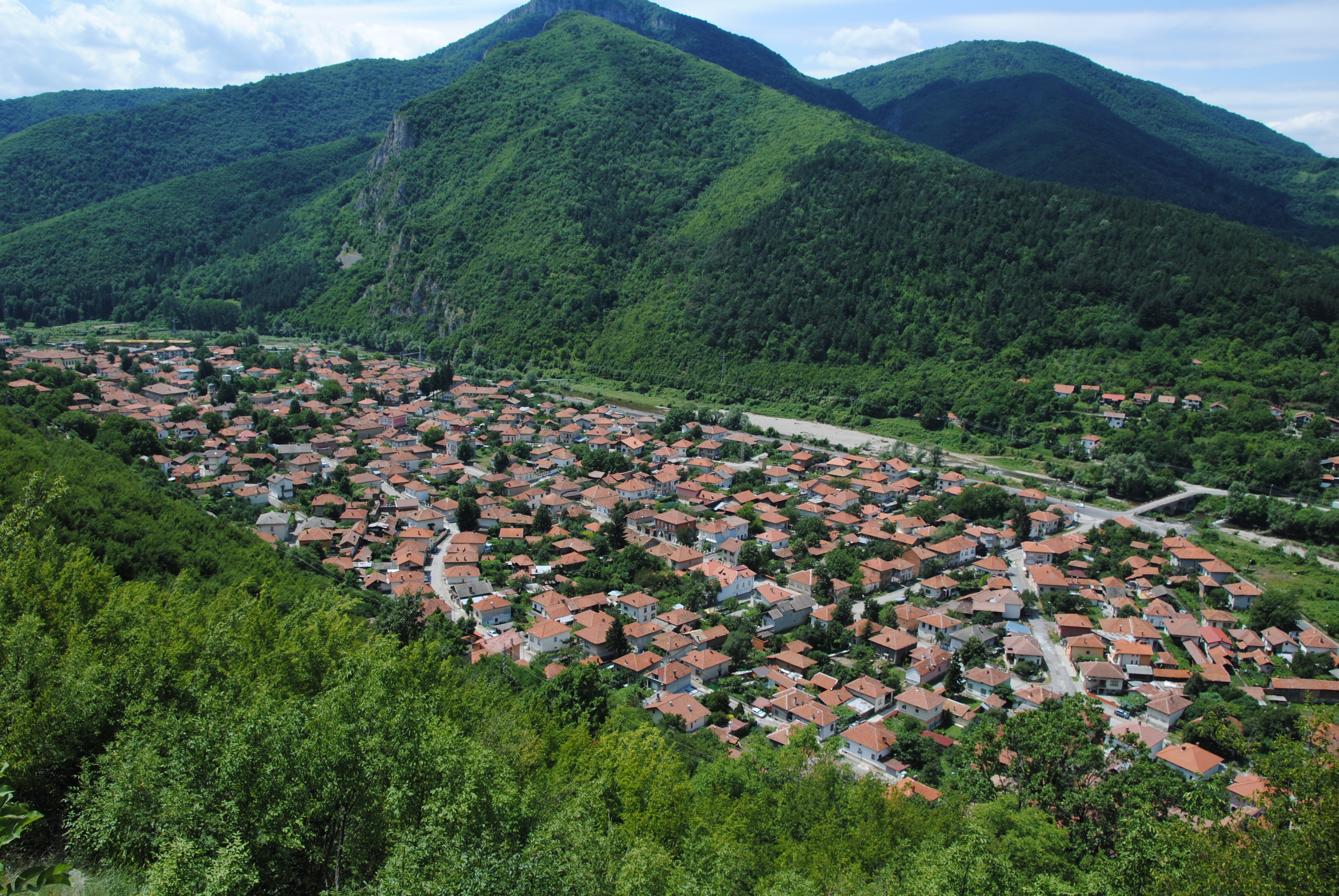

- Location within Bulgaria
- Coordinates: 42.9833°N 24.1833°E
- Country: Bulgaria
- Province: Lovech Province
- Municipality: Teteven
- Time zone: UTC+2 (EET)
  - Summer (DST): UTC+3 (EEST)

Glozhene (Bulgarian: Гложене [ˈɡɫɔʒɛnɛ]) is a village in Teteven Municipality, Lovech Province, northern Bulgaria. Close to the village is located the Glozhene Monastery.

== Gallery ==
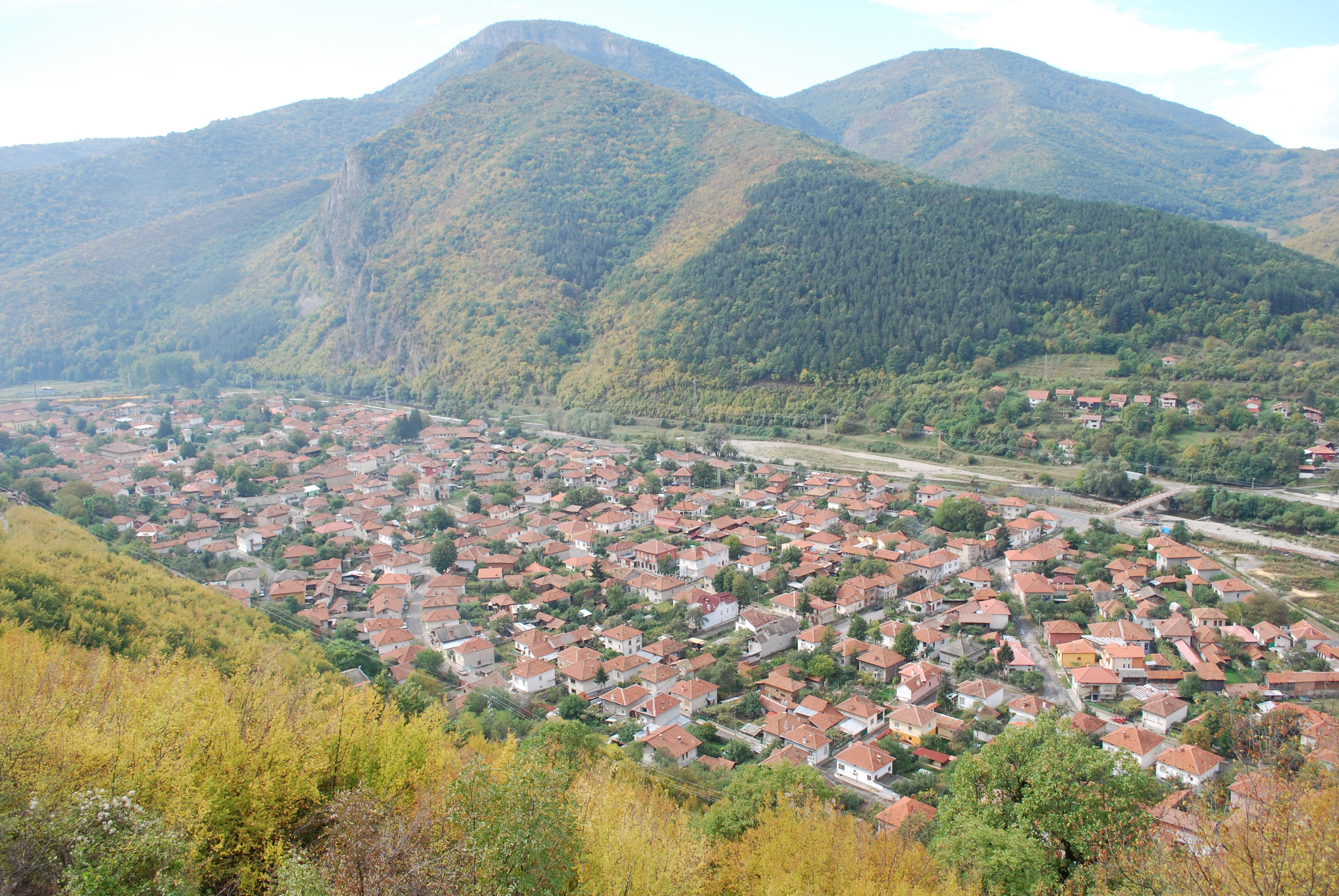
A view of Glozhene

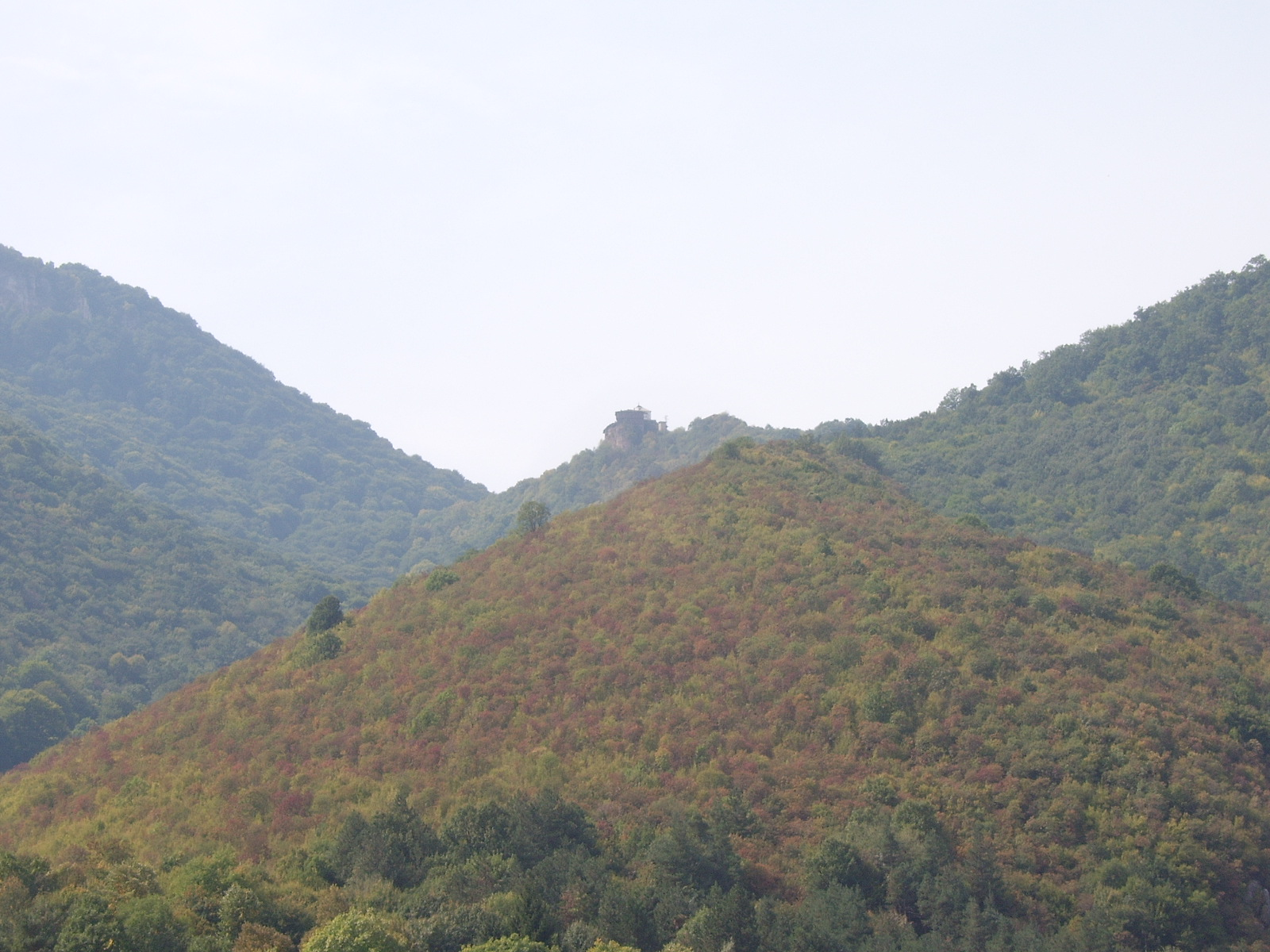
Glozhene Monastery seen from the village

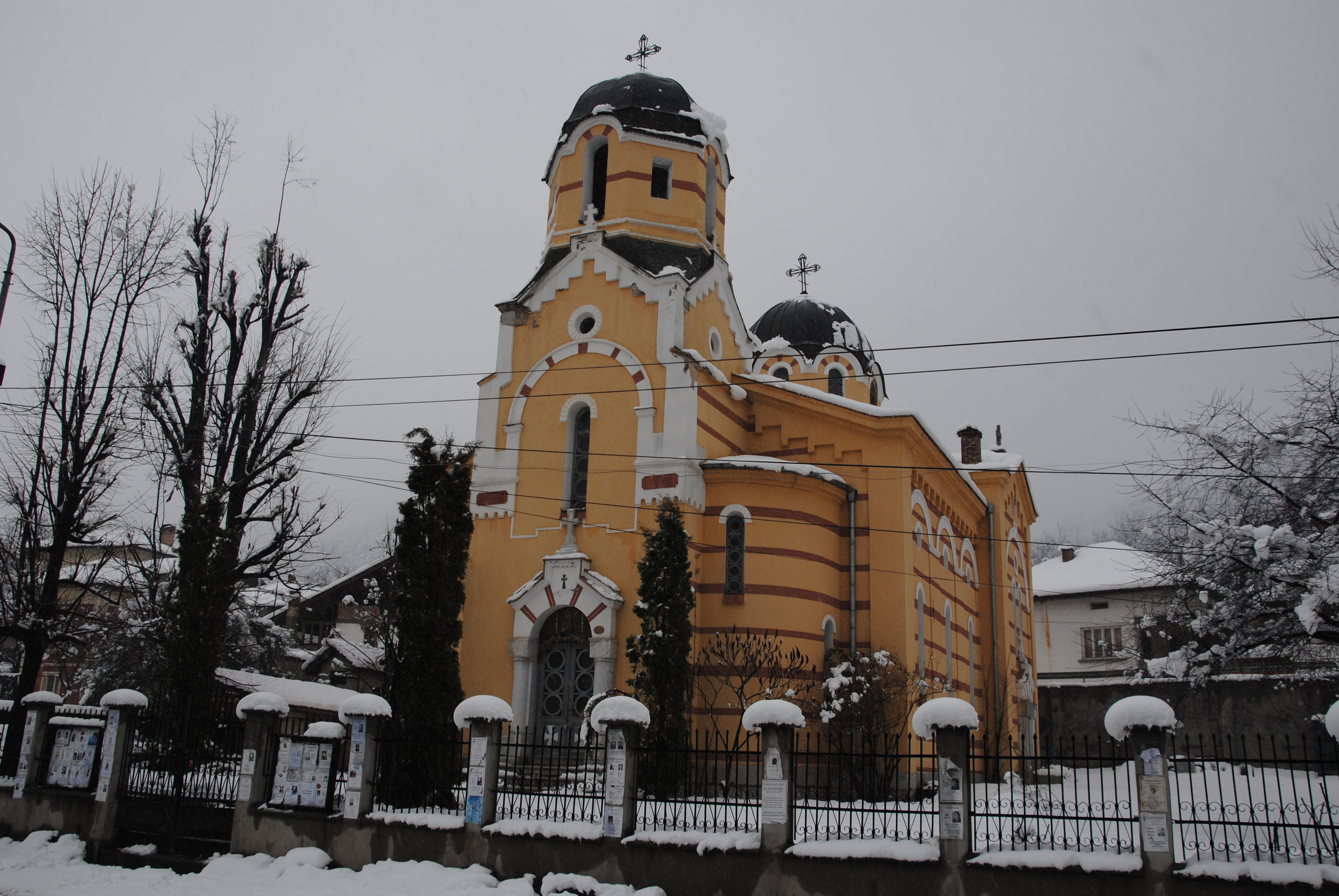
Church of St Demetrius

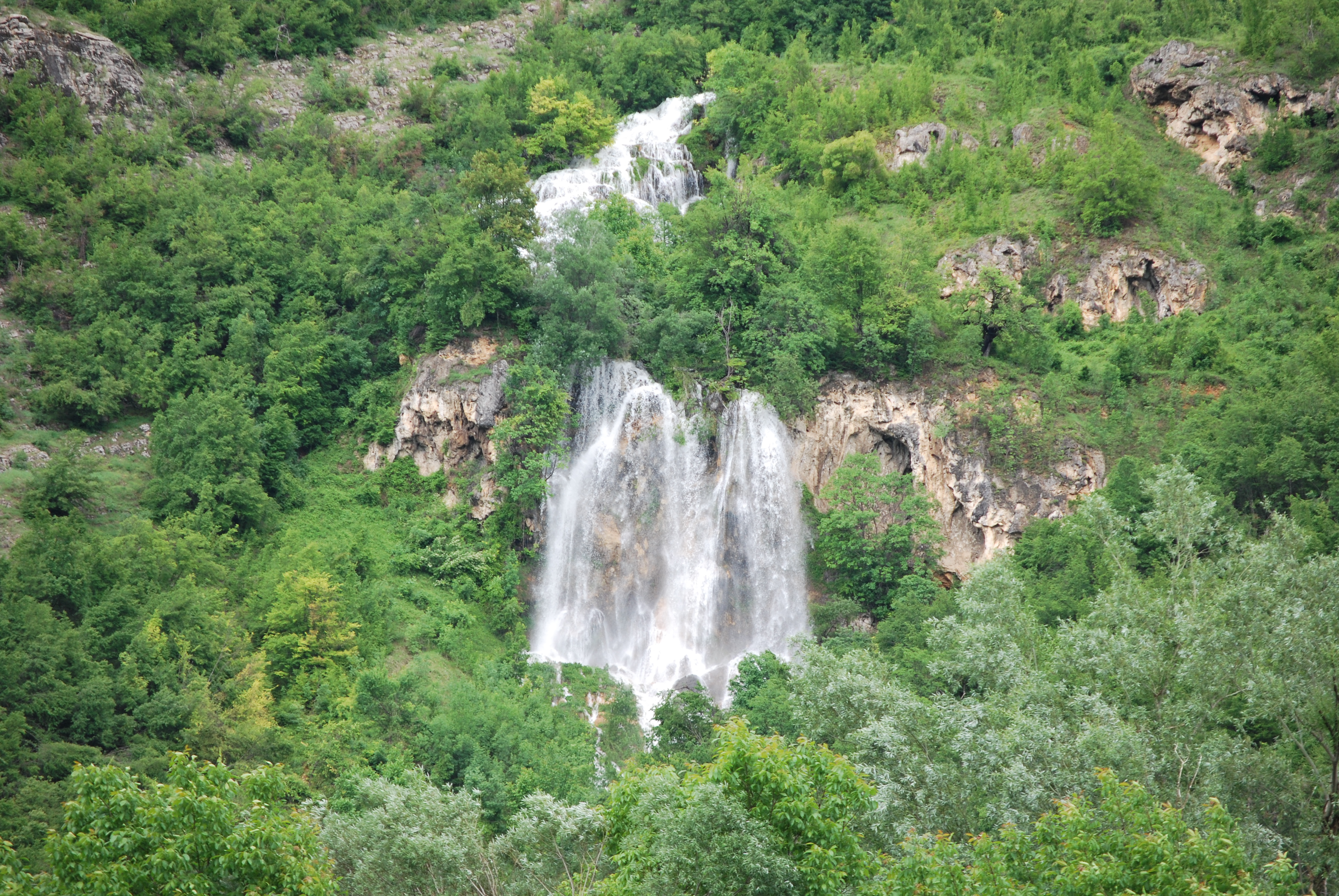
Glozhene waterfall
