= List of PFC Levski Sofia seasons =

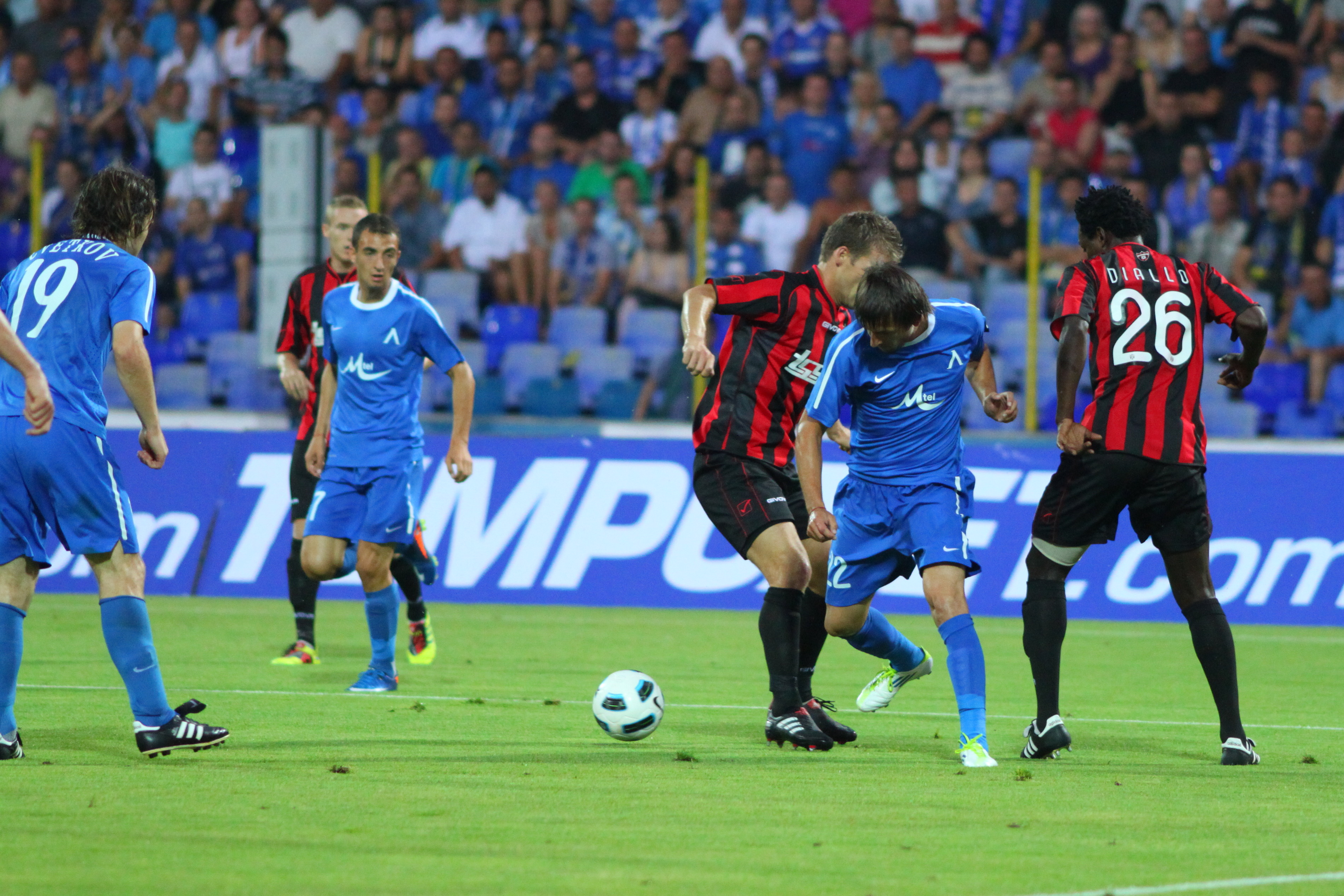
Levski Sofia – Spartak Trnava, 2011–12 UEFA Europa League (2–1)

PFC Levski Sofia final league position (A PFG, 1949-2016)

PFC Levski Sofia, (Bulgarian: ПФК Левски София) otherwise simply known as Levski or Levski Sofia, is a professional football club based in Sofia, Bulgaria.

This is a list of the club's achievements in major competitions in Bulgarian and European football. It covers all seasons from 1921 (when the first official competitive football tournament was held in Bulgaria), to the most recent completed season.

Levski Sofia has taken part in all national football championships since they are officially organized and has never been relegated from the top division of the Bulgarian football championship.

The club has won 27 league titles, 11 Sofia championship titles, 26 Bulgarian cups and 3 Bulgarian supercups.

== Key ==
- P = Played
- W = Games won
- D = Games drawn
- L = Games lost
- F = Goals for
- A = Goals against
- Pts = Points
- Pos = Final position
- SC = Sofia Championship
- SFC = State Football Championship
- NFD = National Football Division
- RFC = Republic Football Championship
- A Group = A Football Group
- Prem = Premier football league
- FPL = First Professional Football league
- TC = Tsar's Cup
- CSA = Cup of the Soviet Army
- BC = Bulgarian Cup
- QR = Qualifying Round
- QR1 = First Qualifying Round
- QR2 = Second Qualifying Round
- QR3 = Third Qualifying Round
- QR4 = Fourth Qualifying Round
- PO = Play-off Round
- GR = Group Stage
- FGR = Final Group Stage
- R1 = Round 1
- R2 = Round 2
- R3 = Round 3
- R4 = Round 4
- R5 = Round 5
- R6 = Round 6
- QF = Quarter-finals
- SF = Semi-finals

Champions	Runners-up	Promoted	Relegated

== Seasons ==
Season	League									Cup	Supercup	International	Other
Season	Division	P	W	D	L	GF	GA	Pts	Pos	Cup	Supercup	International	Other
1921–22	SC	13	10	1	2	38	7	21	quit				
1922–23	SC	8	8	0	0	40	7	16	1st				
1923–24	SC	16	12	3	1	69	9	27	1st				
1923–24	SFC	2	1	1	0	7	0		abandoned				
1924–25	SC	16	13	3	0	70	14	29	1st				
1924–25	SFC	2	1	0	1	4	2		runners-up				
1925–26	SC	10	6	1	3	32	18	13	2nd				
1926–27	SC	10	5	2	3	19	12	12	2nd				
1927–28	SC	10	8	0	2	31	12	16	2nd				
1928–29	SC	10	6	3	1	26	16	15	1st				
1928–29	SFC	2	1	0	1	2	1		runners-up				
1929–30	SC	10	5	1	4	17	13	11	3rd				
1930–31	SC	10	6	2	2	26	17	14	2nd				
1931–32	SC	10	5	2	3	19	14	12	2nd				
1932–33	SC	14	12	1	1	60	21	25	1st	TC – winners			
1932–33	SFC	3	3	0	0	16	4		winners	TC – winners			
1933–34	SC	14	4	4	6	26	20	12	5th				
1934–35	SC	14	6	3	5	19	22	15	4th				
1935–36	SC	7	3	0	4	14	12	6	5th				
1936–37	SC	14	8	5	1	30	9	21	1st	TC – winners			
1936–37	SFC	4	3	1	0	12	2		winners	TC – winners			
1937–38	NFD	18	7	4	7	30	26	18	7th	TC – R4			
1938–39	NFD	18	8	2	8	29	25	18	6th	TC – R1			
1939–40	NFD	18	9	4	5	29	18	22	2nd	TC – R5			
1940–41	SC	12	6	2	4	19	16	14	4th	TC – R3			
1941–42	SC	14	11	2	1	43	11	24	1st	TC – winners			
1941–42	SFC	6	6	0	0	19	4		winners	TC – winners			
1942–43	SC	16	12	0	4	40	19	24	1st				
1942–43	SFC	8	5	1	2	15	9		runners-up				
1943–44	SC	7	3	1	3	16	9	7	3rd				
1943–44	SFC	4	4	0	0	17	5		abandoned				
1944–45	SC	7	6	1	0	15	4	13	1st				
1944–45	RFC	3	2	0	1	7	3		QF				
1945–46	SC	8	5	1	2	21	6	11	1st	CSA – winners			
1945–46	RFC	6	6	0	0	17	2		winners	CSA – winners			
1946–47	SC	9	5	3	1	16	9	13	2nd	CSA – winners			
1946–47	RFC	6	5	1	0	17	3		winners	CSA – winners			
1947–48	SC	10	6	1	3	17	14	13	1st	CSA – R3			
1947–48	RFC	8	5	2	1	18	10		runners-up	CSA – R3			
1948–49	A Group	18	15	3	0	44	8	33	1st	CSA – winners			
1950	A Group	18	12	5	1	36	12	29	1st	CSA – winners			
1951	A Group	22	9	8	5	37	16	26	3rd	CSA – SF			
1952	A Group	22	8	6	8	22	16	22	5th	CSA – QF			
1953	A Group	28	19	5	4	48	22	43	1st	CSA – runners-up			
1954	A Group	26	9	10	7	39	26	28	5th	CSA – R2			
1955	A Group	26	10	7	9	33	30	27	5th	CSA – R1			
1956	A Group	22	8	10	4	30	24	26	2nd	CSA – winners			
1957	A Group	22	12	6	4	46	21	30	3rd	CSA – winners			
1958	A Group	11	6	2	3	18	9	14	2nd	CSA – SF			
1958–59	A Group	22	10	4	8	27	15	24	3rd	CSA – winners			
1959–60	A Group	22	11	6	5	32	22	28	2nd	CSA – R2			
1960–61	A Group	26	10	10	6	45	33	30	2nd	CSA – QF		Balkans Cup – runners-up	
1961–62	A Group	26	12	6	8	46	37	30	3rd	CSA – QF		Balkans Cup – runners-up	
1962–63	A Group	30	8	16	6	41	31	32	6th	CSA – SF		Balkans Cup – runners-up	
1963–64	A Group	30	16	9	5	53	32	41	2nd	CSA – SF		Balkans Cup – GR	
1964–65	A Group	30	18	6	6	59	28	42	1st	CSA – runners-up			
1965–66	A Group	30	15	11	4	59	31	41	2nd	CSA – QF		European Cup – R1	
1966–67	A Group	30	13	10	7	46	32	36	3rd	CSA – winners			
1967–68	A Group	30	18	9	3	61	29	45	1st	CSA – SF		Cup Winners' Cup – R1	
1968–69	A Group	30	17	6	7	59	33	40	2nd	CSA – runners-up		European Cup – withdrew	
1969–70	A Group	30	23	4	3	67	17	50	1st	CSA – winners		Cup Winners' Cup – QF	
1970–71	A Group	30	21	6	3	59	22	48	2nd	CSA – winners		European Cup – QR	
1971–72	A Group	34	22	6	6	68	26	50	2nd	CSA – SF		Cup Winners' Cup – R1	
1972–73	A Group	34	15	10	9	62	37	40	4th	CSA – SF		UEFA Cup – R2	
1973–74	A Group	30	21	5	4	58	30	47	1st	CSA – runners-up			
1974–75	A Group	30	15	8	7	54	30	38	2nd	CSA – QF		European Cup – R1	
1975–76	A Group	30	16	9	5	58	33	41	2nd	CSA – winners		UEFA Cup – QF	
1976–77	A Group	30	17	9	4	73	34	43	1st	CSA – winners		Cup Winners' Cup – QF	
1977–78	A Group	30	15	8	7	53	30	38	3rd	CSA – QF		European Cup – R2	
1978–79	A Group	30	18	7	5	54	29	43	1st	CSA – winners		UEFA Cup – R2	
1979–80	A Group	30	15	7	8	45	38	37	3rd	CSA – R3		European Cup – R1	
1980–81	A Group	30	13	10	7	44	25	36	2nd	CSA – R3		UEFA Cup – R2	BC – FGR
1981–82	A Group	30	20	6	4	71	32	46	2nd	CSA – R3		UEFA Cup – R1	BC – winners
1982–83	A Group	30	18	6	6	50	21	42	2nd	BC – SF		UEFA Cup – R1	CSA – QF
1983–84	A Group	30	19	9	2	64	29	47	1st	BC – winners		UEFA Cup – R2	CSA – winners
1984–85	A Group	30	18	6	6	66	37	40	1st	BC – runners-up		European Cup – R2	CSA – QF
1985–86	A Group	30	14	6	10	55	39	33	5th	BC – winners		Intertoto Cup – GR	CSA – R2
1986–87	A Group	30	19	6	5	75	35	44	2nd	BC – runners-up		Cup Winners' Cup – QF	CSA – winners
1987–88	A Group	30	20	8	2	67	29	48	1st	BC – runners-up		Cup Winners' Cup – R1	CSA – winners
1988–89	A Group	30	17	5	8	63	38	39	2nd	BC – SF		European Cup – R1	CSA – R1
1989–90	A Group	30	12	11	7	57	39	35	4th	BC – QF		UEFA Cup – R1	CSA – QF
1990–91	A Group	30	12	9	9	51	38	33	6th	BC – winners			
1991–92	A Group	30	19	7	4	54	18	45	2nd	BC – winners		Cup Winners' Cup – R1	
1992–93	A Group	30	22	6	2	76	27	50	1st	BC – SF		Cup Winners' Cup – R1	
1993–94	A Group	28	22	5	1	78	17	71	1st	BC – winners		Champions League – R2	
1994–95	A Group	30	26	1	3	84	15	79	1st	BC – R1		UEFA Cup – QR	
1995–96	A Group	30	19	5	6	49	22	62	2nd	BC – runners-up		UEFA Cup – R1	
1996–97	A Group	30	14	11	5	58	30	53	4th	BC – runners-up		Cup Winners' Cup – QR	
1997–98	A Group	30	19	7	4	73	27	64	2nd	BC – winners		Cup Winners' Cup – QR	
1998–99	A Group	29	22	5	2	52	11	71	2nd	BC – R4		Cup Winners' Cup – R1	
1999–2000	A Group	30	23	5	2	66	17	74	1st	BC – winners		UEFA Cup – R2	
2000–01	Prem	26	22	3	1	63	13	69	1st	BC – SF		Champions League – QR2	
2001–02	Prem	36	27	7	2	77	27	56	1st	BC – winners		Champions League – QR3	
2001–02	Prem	36	27	7	2	77	27	56	1st	BC – winners		UEFA Cup – R1	
2002–03	Prem	26	19	3	4	61	19	60	2nd	BC – winners		Champions League – QR3	
2002–03	Prem	26	19	3	4	61	19	60	2nd	BC – winners		UEFA Cup – R2	
2003–04	A Group	30	22	6	2	59	16	72	2nd	BC – QF		UEFA Cup – R3	
2004–05	A Group	30	24	4	2	76	19	76	2nd	BC – winners		UEFA Cup – R1	
2005–06	A Group	28	21	5	2	71	23	68	1st	BC – R3	winners	UEFA Cup – QF	
2006–07	A Group	30	24	5	1	96	13	77	1st	BC – winners	runners-up	Champions League – GR	
2007–08	A Group	30	19	5	6	56	19	62	2nd	BC – QF	winners	Champions League – QR2	
2008–09	A Group	30	21	6	3	57	18	69	1st	BC – SF		Champions League – QR3	
2008–09	A Group	30	21	6	3	57	18	69	1st	BC – SF		UEFA Cup – R1	
2009–10	A Group	30	17	6	7	57	26	57	3rd	BC – R3	winners	Champions League – PO	
2009–10	A Group	30	17	6	7	57	26	57	3rd	BC – R3	winners	Europa League – GR	
2010–11	A Group	30	23	3	4	67	23	72	2nd	BC – QF		Europa League – GR	
2011–12	A Group	30	20	2	8	61	28	62	3rd	BC – QF		Europa League – QR3	
2012–13	A Group	30	22	5	3	59	20	71	2nd	BC – runners-up		Europa League – QR2	
2013–14	A Group	38	19	5	14	59	39	62	5th	BC – QF		Europa League – QR1	
2014–15	A Group	32	17	5	10	66	33	56	7th	BC – runners-up			
2015–16	A Group	32	16	8	8	36	18	56	2nd	BC – QF			
2016–17	FPL	36	18	9	9	50	31	63	3rd	BC – R2		Europa League – QR2	
2017–18	FPL	36	18	10	8	55	27	64	3rd	BC – runners-up		Europa League – QR2	
2018–19	FPL	36	20	6	10	64	37	66	3rd	BC – R2		Europa League – QR1	
2019–20	FPL	31	15	8	8	50	30	53	4th	BC – SF		Europa League – QR2	
2020–21	FPL	32	11	8	13	34	32	41	8th	BC – QF			
2021–22	FPL	31	15	7	9	38	27	52	4th	BC – winners			
2022–23	FPL	35	17	10	8	49	27	61	4th	BC – R2	runners-up	Conference League – QR3	
2023–24	FPL	35	19	7	9	50	30	64	4th	BC – R2		Conference League – PO	
2024–25	FPL	35	19	7	9	50	30	64	2nd	BC – QF			
2025–26	FPL	36	25	6	5	71	25	81	1st	BC – QF			
2026–27	FPL									BC – TBD	TBD	Champions League - TBD	

== See also ==
- The Invincibles (football)
