= List of PFC CSKA Sofia seasons =

List of the football club's achievements

PFC CSKA Sofia, (Bulgarian: ПФК ЦСКА София) otherwise simply known as CSKA or CSKA Sofia, is a professional football club based in Sofia, Bulgaria.

This is a list of the club's achievements in major competitions in Bulgarian and European football. It covers all seasons from 1948 (the birthyear of CSKA) to the most recent completed season.

CSKA Sofia has taken part in all national football championships since they are officially organized and has played only one season outside the top division of the Bulgarian football championship.

The club has won 31 league titles, 22 Bulgarian cups and 5 Bulgarian supercups.

== Key ==
- P = Played
- W = Games won
- D = Games drawn
- L = Games lost
- F = Goals for
- A = Goals against
- Pts = Points
- Pos = Final position

- SC = Sofia Championship
- RFC = Republic Football Championship
- A Group = A Football Group
- Prem = Premier football league
- V AFG = V Amateur Football League
- FL = First Professional Football league
- CSA = Cup of the Soviet Army
- BC = Bulgarian Cup

- QR = Qualifying Round
- QR1 = First Qualifying Round
- QR2 = Second Qualifying Round
- QR3 = Third Qualifying Round
- QR4 = Fourth Qualifying Round
- PO = Play-off Round
- GR = Group Stage
- FGR = Final Group Stage

- R1 = Round 1
- R2 = Round 2
- R3 = Round 3
- R4 = Round 4
- R5 = Round 5
- R6 = Round 6
- QF = Quarter-finals
- SF = Semi-finals

Champions	Runners-up	Promoted	Relegated

== Seasons ==
Season	League									Cup	Supercup	International	Other
Season	Division	P	W	D	L	F	A	Pts	Pos	Cup	Supercup	International	Other
1947–48	SC	10	3	4	2	15	13	11	2nd	–			
1947–48	RFC	8	7	0	1	20	7		Winners	–			
1948–49	A Group	18	10	4	4	28	15	24	2nd	CSA – runners-up			
1950	A Group	18	9	4	5	22	12	22	4th	CSA – runners-up			
1951	A Group	22	18	1	3	62	7	37	1st	CSA – winners			
1952	A Group	22	13	7	2	38	12	33	1st	CSA – QF			
1953	A Group	28	18	6	4	48	22	43	2nd	CSA – SF			
1954	A Group	26	20	5	1	76	14	45	1st	CSA – winners			
1955	A Group	26	14	9	3	38	16	37	1st	CSA – winners			
1956	A Group	22	11	9	2	46	25	31	1st	CSA – SF		European Cup – QF	
1957	A Group	22	15	4	3	53	16	34	1st	CSA – SF		European Cup – QR	
1958	A Group	11	7	4	0	19	9	18	1st	CSA – SF			
1958–59	A Group	22	13	6	3	37	16	32	1st	CSA – R1		European Cup – R1	
1959–60	A Group	22	12	8	2	42	18	32	1st	CSA – QF		European Cup – QR	
1960–61	A Group	26	18	4	4	56	17	30	1st	CSA – winners		European Cup – R1	
1961–62	A Group	26	18	5	3	60	25	41	1st	CSA – R2		European Cup – QR	
1962–63	A Group	30	14	9	7	55	28	37	3rd	CSA – QF		European Cup – R1	
1963–64	A Group	30	12	3	15	58	40	27	11th	CSA – QF			
1964–65	A Group	30	14	6	10	48	26	34	4th	CSA – winners			
1965–66	A Group	30	17	8	5	53	30	42	1st	CSA – runners-up		Cup Winners' Cup – R2	
1966–67	A Group	30	11	12	7	42	34	34	5th	CSA – GR		European Cup – SF	
1967–68	A Group	30	18	6	6	63	27	42	2nd	CSA – GR			
1968–69	A Group	30	22	3	5	74	38	47	1st	CSA – winners			
1969–70	A Group	30	21	5	4	73	29	47	2nd	CSA – runners-up		European Cup – R1	
1970–71	A Group	30	21	6	3	74	21	48	1st	CSA – QF		Cup Winners' Cup – R2	
1971–72	A Group	34	26	6	2	95	28	58	1st	CSA – winners		European Cup – R2	
1972–73	A Group	34	22	7	5	80	40	51	1st	CSA – winners		European Cup – R2	
1973–74	A Group	30	19	8	3	54	27	46	2nd	CSA – winners		European Cup – QF	
1974–75	A Group	30	15	9	6	52	32	39	1st	CSA – SF		Cup Winners' Cup – R1	
1975–76	A Group	30	17	9	4	61	30	43	1st	CSA – runners-up		European Cup – R1	
1976–77	A Group	30	14	11	5	45	27	39	2nd	CSA – R3		European Cup – R1	
1977–78	A Group	30	18	5	7	60	35	41	2nd	CSA – runners-up		UEFA Cup – R1	
1978–79	A Group	30	14	12	4	49	26	40	2nd	CSA – SF		UEFA Cup – R1	
1979–80	A Group	30	18	10	2	60	30	46	1st	CSA – QF		UEFA Cup – R1	
1980–81	A Group	30	14	12	4	70	32	40	1st	CSA – R3		European Cup – QF	BC – winners
1981–82	A Group	30	22	3	5	73	27	47	1st	CSA – SF		European Cup – SF	BC – runners-up
1982–83	A Group	30	18	9	3	52	26	45	1st	BC – winners		European Cup – R2	CSA – SF
1983–84	A Group	30	18	9	3	72	24	45	2nd	BC – SF		European Cup – R2	CSA – SF
1984–85	A Group	30	15	7	8	66	36	36	2nd	BC – winners		UEFA Cup – R2	CSA – winners
1985–86	A Group	30	16	2	12	62	37	34	4th	BC – runners-up			CSA – winners
1986–87	A Group	30	21	5	4	73	30	47	1st	BC – winners		UEFA Cup – R1	CSA – R2
1987–88	A Group	30	20	6	4	76	32	46	2nd	BC – winners		European Cup – R1	CSA – R2
1988–89	A Group	30	20	9	1	86	24	49	1st	BC – winners		Cup Winners' Cup – SF	CSA – winners
1989–90	A Group	30	18	9	3	85	30	45	1st	BC – runners-up	winners	European Cup – QF	CSA – winners
1990–91	A Group	30	14	9	7	51	28	37	2nd	BC – GR		European Cup – R2	
1991–92	A Group	30	20	7	3	74	26	47	1st	BC – QF		UEFA Cup – R2	
1992–93	A Group	30	17	8	5	66	31	42	2nd	BC – winners		Champions League – R1	
1993–94	A Group	28	17	3	8	58	27	54	2nd	BC – R1		Cup Winners' Cup – R2	
1994–95	A Group	30	13	7	10	51	46	46	5th	BC – QF		UEFA Cup – R1	
1995–96	A Group	30	16	8	6	49	26	56	5th	BC – SF			
1996–97	A Group	30	22	5	3	65	19	71	1st	BC – winners		Intertoto Cup – GR	
1997–98	A Group	30	18	7	5	71	29	61	3rd	BC – runners-up		Champions League – QR1	
1998–99	A Group	30	15	6	9	54	39	50	5th	BC – winners		UEFA Cup – R2	
1999–2000	A Group	30	20	4	6	60	26	64	2nd	BC – QF		UEFA Cup – R1	
2000–01	Prem	26	19	5	2	65	16	62	2nd	BC – QF		UEFA Cup – R1	
2001–02	Prem	36	19	7	10	60	29	38	3rd	BC – runners-up		UEFA Cup – R2	
2002–03	Prem	26	21	3	2	67	16	66	1st	BC – SF		UEFA Cup – R1	
2003–04	Prem	30	20	5	5	65	28	65	3rd	BC – runners-up		Champions League – QR3	
2003–04	Prem	30	20	5	5	65	28	65	3rd	BC – runners-up		UEFA Cup – R1	
2004–05	A Group	30	25	4	1	81	16	79	1st	BC – runners-up		UEFA Cup – R1	
2005–06	A Group	28	20	5	3	73	22	65	2nd	BC – winners	runners-up	Champions League – QR3	
2005–06	A Group	28	20	5	3	73	22	65	2nd	BC – winners	runners-up	UEFA Cup – GR	
2006–07	A Group	30	23	3	4	68	13	72	2nd	BC – QF	winners	UEFA Cup – R1	
2007–08	A Group	30	24	6	0	53	11	78	1st	BC – R1		UEFA Cup – R1	
2008–09	A Group	30	21	5	4	54	22	68	2nd	BC – QF	winners		
2009–10	A Group	30	16	10	4	51	25	58	2nd	BC – QF		Europa League – GR	
2010–11	A Group	30	18	7	5	53	26	61	3rd	BC – winners		Europa League – GR	
2011–12	A Group	30	22	3	5	60	19	69	2nd	BC – QF	winners	Europa League – PO	
2012–13	A Group	30	19	6	5	54	20	63	3rd	BC – QF		Europa League – QR2	
2013–14	A Group	38	21	9	8	56	20	72	2nd	BC – R2			
2014–15	A Group	32	14	10	8	45	27	52	5th	BC – R1		Europa League – QR2	
2015–16	V AFG	32	31	1	0	146	10	94	1st	BC – winners			
2016–17	FL	36	19	10	7	51	21	67	2nd	BC – R1			
2017–18	FL	36	24	9	3	80	26	81	2nd	BC – SF			
2018–19	FL	36	24	6	6	57	17	78	2nd	BC – SF		Europa League – QR3	
2019–20	FL	31	16	11	4	52	22	59	2nd	BC – runners-up		Europa League – QR3	
2020–21	FL	31	17	8	6	46	24	59	3rd	BC – winners		Europa League – GR	
2021–22	FL	31	16	10	5	42	31	58	2nd	BC – runners-up	runners-up	Conference League – GR	
2022–23	FL	35	26	6	3	65	17	84	2nd	BC – QF		Conference League – PO	
2023–24	FL	35	20	7	8	56	27	67	3rd	BC – SF		Conference League – QR2	
2024–25	FL	36	19	8	9	58	28	65	5th	BC – runners-up			
2025–26	FL	36	18	9	9	47	30	63	4th	BC – winners			
2026–27	FL									BC –	winners	Europa League – PO	
2026–27	FL									BC –	winners	Conference League –	

== Footnotes ==
- Seasons at the CSKA Sofia fan page
