= 1957 PFC Cherno More Varna season =

Cherno More Varna
1957 season
- Manager: Ivan Mokanov
- Republican Football Group A: 9th
- Bulgarian Cup: Quarterfinals

The 1957 season marked the immediate return of Cherno More to the top flight of Bulgarian football after the club was dramatically relegated in 1955. The club started the season as SCNA Varna (Bulgarian: СКНА Варна), Sport Club of the People's Army, but was renamed to Botev Varna in June 1957.

== Overview ==
=== Background ===
Cherno More was relegated from A Group at the end of 1955, despite starting the season with 5 consecutive wins and finishing only three point off third place. The following year the team won the regional B group and booked a place for an end-of-the-season qualifying tournament played in Sofia in November 1956 to determine the last two teams to join A group in 1957. Competing were the five winners of the regional B groups and 11th-placed in A Group Zavod 12. Cherno More, competing as SCNA Varna, won a deciding match against Lokomotiv Plovdiv on 20 November 1956 to finish second.

=== Winless Streak ===
The team lost seven of the first 8 games, only drawing against Levski Sofia in Varna on 24 March 1957. Form improved somewhat in the following fixtures, but the Sailors remained winless after 15 matches of the 22 rounds season. With only six points gained and seven matches remaining, the club was bottom of the table and facing relegation for the second time in three years.

=== The Great Escape ===
The team, recently renamed Botev Varna midseason, achieved first win of the campaign in round 16 by defeating Botev Plovdiv 1-0 on 1 September 1957, giving supporters hope before a fixture break until mid-October. League football returned on October 13 with the 4-0 thrashing of Marek Stanke Dimitrov, followed by two more wins against city rivals Spartak and eventual runners-up Lokomotiv Sofia, denting their title hopes in the process. Botev Varna then drew against the dominant force of Bulgarian football and eventual league winners CDNA in Sofia, before securing survival with a game to spare by comfortably defeating Spartak Plovdiv 3-0 at home.

== Republican Football Group A ==
=== Matches ===
17 March 1957 Round 1	Minyor Dimitrovo	2–0	Botev Varna	Pernik

24 March 1957 Round 2	Botev Varna	1–1	Levski Sofia	Varna

31 March 1957 Round 3	Spartak Pleven	3–1	Botev Varna	Pleven

7 April 1957 Round 4	Botev Varna	1–2	Slavia Sofia	Varna

14 April 1957 Round 5	Botev Plovdiv	1–0	Botev Varna	Plovdiv

21 April 1957 Round 6	Marek Stanke Dimitrov	1–0	Botev Varna	Dupnitsa

26 April 1957 Round 11	Botev Varna	0–3	Spartak Varna	Varna

11 May 1957 Round 8	Lokomotiv Sofia	1–0	Botev Varna	Sofia

2 June 1957 Round 9	Botev Varna	1–1	CDNA	Varna

9 June 1957 Round 10	Spartak Plovdiv	0–0	Botev Varna	Plovdiv

30 June 1957 Round 7	Botev Varna	1–1	Spartak Sofia	Varna

7 July 1957 Round 12	Botev Varna	0–0	Minyor Dimitrovo	Varna

12 July 1957 Round 13	Levski Sofia	3–2	Botev Varna	Sofia

18 August 1957 Round 14	Botev Varna	0–0	Spartak Pleven	Varna

24 August 1957 Round 15	Slavia Sofia	2–2	Botev Varna	Sofia

1 September 1957 Round 16	Botev Varna	1–0	Botev Plovdiv	Varna

13 October 1957 Round 17	Botev Varna	4–0	Marek Stanke Dimitrov	Varna

20 October 1957 Round 22	Spartak Varna	0–1	Botev Varna	Varna

10 November 1957 Round 19	Botev Varna	1–0	Lokomotiv Sofia	Varna

17 November 1957 Round 20	CDNA	0–0	Botev Varna	Sofia

24 November 1957 Round 21	Botev Varna	3–0	Spartak Plovdiv	Varna

29 November 1957 Round 18	Spartak Sofia	3–0	Botev Varna	Sofia

=== League standings ===
Pos	Team	Pld	W	D	L	GF	GA	GD	Pts	Qualification or relegation
7	Spartak Plovdiv	22	7	5	10	33	41	−8	19	
8	Botev Plovdiv	22	6	7	9	22	33	−11	19	
9	Cherno More Varna	22	5	8	9	19	24	−5	18	
10	Spartak Varna	22	6	6	10	23	31	−8	18	
11	Spartak Sofia (R)	22	4	8	10	22	35	−13	16	Relegation to 1958 B Group

Source: rsssf.com
(R) Relegated

=== Results summary ===
Overall								Home						Away					
Pld	W	D	L	GF	GA	GD	Pts	W	D	L	GF	GA	GD	W	D	L	GF	GA	GD
22	5	8	9	19	24	−5	23	4	5	2	13	8	+5	1	3	7	6	16	−10

== Bulgarian Cup ==
Round of 32	Tundzha Yambol	0–2	Botev Varna	Yambol

Round of 16	Zavod Stalin Dimitrovo	0–5	Botev Varna	Pernik

Quarterfinals	Botev Varna	0–1	CDNA	Varna
