= 1954 Bulgarian Cup final =

- Event: 1954 Bulgarian Cup
CSKA Sofia	Slavia Sofia
2	1
- Date: 7 November 1954
- Venue: Vasil Levski National Stadium, Sofia
- Referee: Todor Stoyanov (Sofia)
- Attendance: 30,000

The 1954 Bulgarian Cup final was the 14th final of the Bulgarian Cup (in this period the tournament was named Cup of the Soviet Army), and was contested between CSKA Sofia and Slavia Sofia on 7 November 1954 at Vasil Levski National Stadium in Sofia. CSKA won the final 2–1, claiming their second national cup title.

== Route to the Final ==
CSKA		Round	Slavia
Opponent	Result		Opponent	Result
Cherno More Varna	4–2 home	Round of 16	Zavod 12	1–0 home
Spartak Plovdiv	2–0 away	Quarter-finals	Velbazhd Kyustendil	3–0 home
Lokomotiv Plovdiv	1–0 home	Semi-finals	Sliven	1–0 away (a.e.t.)

== Match ==
=== Details ===
7 November 1954

CSKA Sofia	2−1	Slavia Sofia
Milanov 21', 31'		Goranov 37' (pen.)

Vasil Levski National Stadium, Sofia
Attendance: 30,000
Referee: Todor Stoyanov (Sofia)

CSKA	Slavia

GK	1	(Bulgaria) Stefan Gerenski
DF	2	(Bulgaria) Kiril Rakarov
DF	3	(Bulgaria) Manol Manolov
DF	4	(Bulgaria) Georgi Enisheynov
MF	5	(Bulgaria) Stefan Bozhkov (c)
MF	6	(Bulgaria) Gavril Stoyanov
FW	7	(Bulgaria) Dimitar Milanov
FW	8	(Bulgaria) Stefan Stefanov	(substituted off) 46'
FW	9	(Bulgaria) Panayot Panayotov
FW	10	(Bulgaria) Ivan Kolev
FW	11	(Bulgaria) Krum Yanev
Substitutes:
FW	--	(Bulgaria) Petar Mihaylov	(substituted in) 46'
Manager:
(Bulgaria) Krum Milev

GK	1	(Bulgaria) Yordan Yosifov
DF	2	(Bulgaria) Panayot Velev (c)
DF	3	(Bulgaria) Toma Atanasov
DF	4	(Bulgaria) Milcho Goranov
MF	5	(Bulgaria) Petar Patev
MF	6	(Bulgaria) Nikola Ivanov
FW	7	(Bulgaria) Yordan Mitov	(substituted off) 46'
FW	8	(Bulgaria) Georgi Kardashev
FW	9	(Bulgaria) Dobromir Tashkov
FW	10	(Bulgaria) Georgi Stoychev
FW	11	(Bulgaria) Georgi Gugalov
Substitutes:
FW	--	(Bulgaria) Hristo Evtimov	(substituted in) 46'
Manager:
(Bulgaria) Ivan Radoev

== See also ==
- 1954 A Group
