= 1964–65 Bulgarian Cup =

Tournament details
- Country: Bulgaria

Final positions
- Champions: CSKA Sofia (5th cup)
- Runners-up: Levski Sofia

The 1964–65 Bulgarian Cup was the 25th season of the Bulgarian Cup (in this period the tournament was named Cup of the Soviet Army). CSKA Sofia won the competition, beating Levski Sofia 3–2 in the final at the Ovcha Kupel Stadium.

== First round ==
Team 1	Score	Team 2
Rozova Dolina	3–1	Lokomotiv Plovdiv
Botev Sliven	1–5	Beroe Stara Zagora
Velbazhd Kyustendil	1–0	Marek Dupnitsa
Spartak Sofia	4–0	Gigant Belene
Cherno More Varna	1–2	Dobrudzha Dobrich
Hebar Pazardzhik	0–1	Lokomotiv Sofia
Balkan Botevgrad	0–4	Levski Sofia
Slavia Sofia	0–0 (0–4 p)	Tundzha Yambol
Septemvri Sofia	2–1	Botev Plovdiv
DMZ A. Ivanov Plovdiv	1–3	CSKA Sofia
Spartak Plovdiv	2–1	Gorubso Madan
Benkovski Isperih	0–1	Spartak Pleven
Svetkavitsa	3–0	Sliven
Yantra Gabrovo	2–1	Dunav Ruse
Lokomotiv Ruse	0–1	Akademik Sofia
Montana	0–0 (4–4 p)^{1}	Botev Vratsa

- ^{1}Montana qualified by drawing lots.

== Second round ==
Team 1	Agg.	Team 2	1st leg	2nd leg
Spartak Sofia	6–2	Velbazhd Kyustendil	6–0	0–2
CSKA Sofia	7–0	Montana	6–0	1–0
Spartak Plovdiv	5–2	Septemvri Sofia	5–1	0–1
Lokomotiv Sofia	8–2	Svetkavitsa	3–0	5–2
Spartak Pleven	3–2	Dobrudzha Dobrich	1–2	2–0
Akademik Sofia	0–0 (5–4 p)	Yantra Gabrovo	0–0	0–0
Beroe Stara Zagora	5–2	Rozova Dolina	2–1	3–1
Tundzha Yambol	1–2	Levski Sofia	0–0	1–2

== Quarter-finals ==
Team 1	Agg.	Team 2	1st leg	2nd leg
Levski Sofia	6–3	Akademik Sofia	4–1	2–2
Spartak Plovdiv	3–3 (4–5 p)	Beroe Stara Zagora	3–1	0–2
Spartak Sofia	2–5	CSKA Sofia	1–2	1–3
Lokomotiv Sofia	3–3 (5–4 p)	Spartak Pleven	2–2	1–1

== Semi-finals ==
Team 1	Agg.	Team 2	1st leg	2nd leg
Lokomotiv Sofia	0–1	CSKA Sofia	0–1	0–0
Levski Sofia	2–1	Beroe Stara Zagora	0–0	2–1

== Final ==
=== Details ===
8 September 1965

CSKA Sofia	3−2	Levski Sofia
Nikodimov 4'; Tsanev 34'; Kirilov 85' (pen.)		Vasilev 69' (o.g.); Sokolov 77' (pen.)

Ovcha Kupel Stadium, Sofia
Attendance: 30,000
Referee: Ion Riter (Romania)

CSKA	Levski
