= Hristo Iliev (footballer) =

Bulgarian footballer

Personal information
- Full name: Hristo Bristov Iliev
- Date of birth: 11 May 1936
- Place of birth: Sofia, Bulgaria
- Date of death: 24 March 1974 (aged 37)
- Place of death: Bulgaria
- Position: Forward

Senior career*
Years	Team	Apps	(Gls)
1954–1959	Levski Sofia	106	(49)
1959–1961	Botev Plovdiv	38	(10)
1961–1968	Levski Sofia	168	(50)
Total		312	(109)

International career
1955–1963	Bulgaria	24	(9)
- * Club domestic league appearances and goals

Hristo Bristov Iliev (Bulgarian: Христо Бристов Илиев; 11 May 1936 – 24 March 1974) was a Bulgarian footballer. He played as a forward and spent the majority of his career with Levski Sofia. Iliev also represented Bulgaria at international level in the 1962 World Cup and in the men's tournament at the 1960 Summer Olympics, where Bulgaria did reach the 5th place in the final ranking.

Iliev died in a car crash on 24 March 1974.

== Honours ==
=== Club ===
Levski Sofia

- Bulgarian A Group (2): 1964–65, 1967–68
- Bulgarian Cup (4): 1956, 1957, 1958–59, 1966–67

=== Individual ===
- Bulgarian A Group top scorer (14 goals): 1957
