= 1967 Bulgarian Cup final =

- Event: 1966–67 Bulgarian Cup
Levski Sofia	Spartak Sofia
3	0
- Date: 16 July 1967
- Venue: Vasil Levski National Stadium, Sofia
- Referee: Todor Bechirov (Plovdiv)
- Attendance: 30,000

The 1967 Bulgarian Cup final was the 27th final of the Bulgarian Cup (in this period the tournament was named Cup of the Soviet Army), and was contested between Levski Sofia and Spartak Sofia on 16 July 1967 at Vasil Levski National Stadium in Sofia. Levski won the final 3–0.

== Match ==
=== Details ===
16 July 1967

Levski Sofia	3−0	Spartak Sofia
Asparuhov 32'; Iliev 69'; Nikolov 71'

Vasil Levski National Stadium, Sofia
Attendance: 30,000
Referee: Todor Bechirov (Plovdiv)

Levski	Spartak

GK	1	(Bulgaria) Biser Mihaylov
DF	2	(Bulgaria) Stoichko Peshev
DF	3	(Bulgaria) Georgi Zlatkov
DF	4	(Bulgaria) Ivan Zdravkov
MF	5	(Bulgaria) Aleksandar Manolov
MF	6	(Bulgaria) Georgi Georgiev
FW	7	(Bulgaria) Simeon Nikolov	(substituted off) 84'
FW	8	(Bulgaria) Georgi Sokolov
FW	9	(Bulgaria) Georgi Asparuhov
FW	10	(Bulgaria) Hristo Iliev (c)
FW	11	(Bulgaria) Aleksandar Kostov
Substitutes:
FW	--	(Bulgaria) Tsvetan Veselinov	(substituted in) 84'
Manager:
(Bulgaria) Krastyo Chakarov

GK	1	(Bulgaria) Georgi Naydenov
DF	2	(Bulgaria) Milko Gaydarski
DF	3	(Bulgaria) Dobromir Zhechev (c)
DF	4	(Bulgaria) Hristo Milenkov
MF	5	(Bulgaria) Panteley Dimitrov
DF	6	(Bulgaria) Ivan Dimitrov
FW	7	(Bulgaria) Mihail Gyonin
MF	8	(Bulgaria) Stoyan Kitov
FW	9	(Bulgaria) Georgi Tsvetkov
MF	10	(Bulgaria) Yosif Haralampiev
MF	11	(Bulgaria) Vasil Mitkov	(substituted off) 60'
Substitutes:
FW	--	(Bulgaria) Ivan Rankov	(substituted in) 60'
Manager:
(Bulgaria) Lyubomir Angelov

== See also ==
- 1966–67 A Group
