= 1971–72 Bulgarian Cup =

Tournament details
- Country: Bulgaria

Final positions
- Champions: CSKA Sofia (7th cup)
- Runners-up: Slavia Sofia

Tournament statistics
- Top goal scorer(s): D. Marashliev (CSKA); Petko Petkov (Beroe) (7 goals)

The 1971–72 Bulgarian Cup was the 32nd season of the Bulgarian Cup (in this period the tournament was named Cup of the Soviet Army). CSKA Sofia won the competition, beating Slavia Sofia 3–0 in the final at the Vasil Levski National Stadium.

== Preliminary round ==
Team 1	Score	Team 2
1971
Svetkavitsa	2–1	Dobrudzha Dobrich
Benkovski Byala	0–0 (a.e.t.) (1–3 p)	Beloslav
Shumen	2–0	Dorostol Silistra
Akademik Svishtov	4–1	Ludogorets Razgrad
Sakarski Minyor	1–2	Rodopa Smolyan
Chirpan	3–0	Karnobat
Sliven	3–1	Haskovo
Maritsa Plovdiv	2–3	Arda Kardzhali
Velbazhd Kyustendil	2–1 (a.e.t.)	Hebar Pazardzhik
Sportist Svoge	2–1	Chorni Breznik
STZ Kl. Voroshilov	2–0	Minyor Brezhani
Botev Yoglav	0–3	Gigant Belene
Montana	3–0	Lokomotiv Dryanovo
Bdin Vidin	5–0	Metalurg Eliseyna

== First round ==
Team 1	Score	Team 2
22 December 1971
Svetkavitsa	1–4	Spartak Varna
Beloslav	0–2	Etar Veliko Tarnovo
Cherno More Varna	4–0	Shumen
Dunav Ruse	4–2	Akademik Svishtov
Rodopa Smolyan	0–2	Beroe Stara Zagora
Botev Plovdiv	3–0	Chirpan
Tundzha Yambol	0–0 (a.e.t.) (6–5 p)	Sliven
Chernomorets Burgas	0–1	Arda Kardzhali
Velbazhd Kyustendil	1–3	Levski Sofia
Marek Dupnitsa	9–2	Sportist Svoge
STZ Kl. Voroshilov	1–7	CSKA Sofia
Gigant Belene	0–2	Botev Vratsa
Lokomotiv Sofia	4–0	Montana
Slavia Sofia	3–1	Bdin Vidin
Spartak Pleven	0–1	Akademik Sofia
Yantra Gabrovo	3–0	Lokomotiv Plovdiv

== Group stage ==
=== Group 1 ===
Matches were played in Petrich, Sandanski, Blagoevgrad and Gotse Delchev

Team 1	Score	Team 2
19–27 February 1972
Beroe Stara Zagora	5–1	Tundzha Yambol
Lokomotiv Sofia	2–0	Arda Kardzhali
Beroe Stara Zagora	1–3	Lokomotiv Sofia
Tundzha Yambol	1–0	Arda Kardzhali
Arda Kardzhali	0–1	Beroe Stara Zagora
Lokomotiv Sofia	1–0	Tundzha Yambol

Pos	Team	Pld	W	D	L	GF	GA	GD	Pts	Qualification
1	Lokomotiv Sofia	3	3	0	0	6	1	+5	6	Quarter-finals
2	Beroe Stara Zagora	3	2	0	1	7	4	+3	4	Quarter-finals
3	Tundzha Yambol	3	1	0	2	2	6	−4	2	
4	Arda Kardzhali	3	0	0	3	0	4	−4	0	

=== Group 2 ===
Matches were played in Haskovo, Dimitrovgrad and Harmanli

Team 1	Score	Team 2
19–27 February 1972
Levski Sofia	2–0	Marek Dupnitsa
Spartak Varna	1–0	Akademik Sofia
Levski Sofia	0–0	Spartak Varna
Marek Dupnitsa	3–2	Akademik Sofia
Akademik Sofia	1–2	Levski Sofia
Spartak Varna	1–1	Marek Dupnitsa

Pos	Team	Pld	W	D	L	GF	GA	GD	Pts	Qualification
1	Levski Sofia	3	2	1	0	4	1	+3	5	Quarter-finals
2	Spartak Varna	3	1	2	0	2	1	+1	4	Quarter-finals
3	Marek Dupnitsa	3	1	1	1	4	5	−1	3	
4	Akademik Sofia	3	0	0	3	3	6	−3	0	

=== Group 3 ===
Matches were played in Stamboliyski, Velingrad, Pazardzhik and Panagyurishte

Team 1	Score	Team 2
19–27 February 1972
CSKA Sofia	0–0	Dunav Ruse
Botev Vratsa	0–0	Yantra Gabrovo
CSKA Sofia	3–1	Botev Vratsa
Dunav Ruse	0–0	Yantra Gabrovo
Yantra Gabrovo	0–4	CSKA Sofia
Botev Vratsa	0–1	Dunav Ruse

Pos	Team	Pld	W	D	L	GF	GA	GD	Pts	Qualification
1	CSKA Sofia	3	2	1	0	7	1	+6	5	Quarter-finals
2	Dunav Ruse	3	1	2	0	1	0	+1	4	Quarter-finals
3	Yantra Gabrovo	3	0	2	1	0	4	−4	2	
4	Botev Vratsa	3	0	1	2	1	4	−3	1	

=== Group 4 ===
Matches were played in Chirpan, Nova Zagora, Stara Zagora and Radnevo

Team 1	Score	Team 2
19–27 February 1972
Slavia Sofia	3–1	Cherno More Varna
Etar Veliko Tarnovo	2–2	Botev Plovdiv
Slavia Sofia	1–0	Etar Veliko Tarnovo
Cherno More Varna	0–1	Botev Plovdiv
Botev Plovdiv	1–1	Slavia Sofia
Etar Veliko Tarnovo	1–2	Cherno More Varna

Pos	Team	Pld	W	D	L	GF	GA	GD	Pts	Qualification
1	Slavia Sofia	3	2	1	0	5	2	+3	5	Quarter-finals
2	Botev Plovdiv	3	1	2	0	4	3	+1	4	Quarter-finals
3	Cherno More Varna	3	1	0	2	3	5	−2	2	
4	Etar Veliko Tarnovo	3	0	1	2	3	5	−2	1	

== Quarter-finals ==
Team 1	Score	Team 2	Place
1972
Lokomotiv Sofia	1–1 (a.e.t.) (4–3 p)	Dunav Ruse	Pleven
Beroe Stara Zagora	0–2	CSKA Sofia	Plovdiv
Levski Sofia	4–2	Botev Plovdiv	Veliko Tarnovo
Spartak Varna	0–1	Slavia Sofia	Gabrovo

== Semi-finals ==
Team 1	Score	Team 2
28–29 June 1972
CSKA Sofia	1–0	Lokomotiv Sofia
Slavia Sofia	1–1 (a.e.t.) (9–8 p)	Levski Sofia

== Final ==
=== Details ===
12 July 1972

CSKA Sofia	3−0	Slavia Sofia
Zhekov 18'; Marashliev 28', 55' (pen.)

Vasil Levski National Stadium, Sofia
Attendance: 25,000
Referee: Petar Nikolov (Sofia)

CSKA	Slavia
