= 1949 Bulgarian Cup =

Tournament details
- Country: Bulgaria

Final positions
- Champions: Levski Sofia (4th cup)
- Runners-up: CSKA Sofia

Tournament statistics
- Top goal scorer(s): Stefanov (CSKA) (5 goals)

The 1949 Bulgarian Cup was the 9th season of the Bulgarian Cup (in this period the tournament was named Cup of the Soviet Army). Levski Sofia won the competition, beating CSKA Sofia 2–1 in the 2nd replay after a 1–1 draw in the final and 2–2 draw in the 1st replay.

== First round ==
Team 1	Score	Team 2
3 April 1949
Tundzha Yambol	0–4	CSKA Sofia
Hebar Pazardzhik	1–4	Levski Sofia
Spartak Varna	0–1	Spartak Sofia
Chernomorets Burgas	2–1	Lokomotiv Sofia
Dinamo Sofia	1–4	Bdin Vidin
Spartak Pleven	2–1	Lokomotiv Plovdiv
Minyor Pernik	2–1	Cherno More Varna
Marek Dupnitsa	0–0 (a.e.t.)	Slavia Sofia
Replay: 4 April 1949
Marek Dupnitsa	0–2	Slavia Sofia

== Quarter-finals ==
Team 1	Score	Team 2
17 April 1949
CSKA Sofia	1–1 (a.e.t.)	Spartak Sofia
Levski Sofia	7–0	Minyor Pernik
Slavia Sofia	4–0	Bdin Vidin
Spartak Pleven	3–1	Chernomorets Burgas
Replay: 18 April 1949
CSKA Sofia	3–2	Spartak Sofia

== Semi-finals ==
Team 1	Score	Team 2
1 May 1949
Spartak Pleven	4–6	CSKA Sofia
Levski Sofia	1–0	Slavia Sofia

== Final ==
=== First game ===
8 May 1949

Levski Sofia	1−1 (a.e.t.)	CSKA Sofia
K. Georgiev 81'		Stefanov 6'

Yunak Stadium, Sofia
Attendance: 35,000
Referee: Todor Stoyanov (Sofia)

=== Second game ===
16 May 1949

Levski Sofia	2−2 (a.e.t.)	CSKA Sofia
A. Dimitrov 56', 59'		Bogdanov 36'; Milanov 51'

Yunak Stadium, Sofia
Attendance: 35,000
Referee: Stefan Danchev (Varna)

=== Third game ===
17 May 1949

Levski Sofia	2−1 (a.e.t.)	CSKA Sofia
Spasov 78'; A. Dimitrov 113'		Bozhilov 2' (pen.)

Yunak Stadium, Sofia
Attendance: 35,000
Referee: Stefan Danchev (Varna)
