= Yordan Yosifov =

Bulgarian footballer (1932–2014)

Personal information
- Full name: Yordan Yordanov Yosifov
- Date of birth: 12 August 1932
- Place of birth: Sofia, Bulgaria
- Date of death: 23 December 2014 (aged 82)
- Position: Goalkeeper

Senior career*
Years	Team	Apps	(Gls)
1952–1957	Slavia Sofia	108	(0)
1958–1963	Lokomotiv Sofia	99	(0)
1963–1964	Slavia Sofia	2	(0)

International career
1954–1963	Bulgaria	13	(0)
- * Club domestic league appearances and goals

Yordan Yosifov (Bulgarian: Йордан Йосифов, 12 August 1932 – 23 December 2014) was a Bulgarian footballer, who played at both professional and international levels, as a goalkeeper. He competed in the men's tournament at the 1956 Summer Olympics.

== Honours ==
=== Club ===
Slavia Sofia

- Bulgarian Cup: 1952

=== International ===
Bulgaria

- Olympic Bronze Medal: 1956
