= 1940 Bulgarian Cup =

1940 Tsar's Cup
Царска купа

Tournament details
- Country: Bulgaria

Final positions
- Champions: FC 13 Sofia (2nd cup)
- Runners-up: Sportklub Plovdiv

Tournament statistics
- Top goal scorer(s): N. Nikolov (FC 13); S. Abadzhiev (Levski Rs) (4 goals)

The 1940 Bulgarian Cup (in this period the tournament was named Tsar's Cup) was the third cup competition, which took place in parallel to the national championship. The cup was won by FC 13 Sofia who beat Sportklub Plovdiv 2–1 in the final at the Levski Playground in Sofia. Initially the final was reached by Levski Ruse, but on 9 October 1940 the team declined to play due to financial disagreements with the football federation.

== First round ==
Team 1	Score	Team 2
Bdin Vidin	1−0	Tsar Krum Byala Slatina
Orlovets Gabrovo	1−5	Pobeda Varna
Levski Dupnitsa	0−1	Sportklub Plovdiv
Tritsvet Chirpan	6−0	Botev Haskovo
Levski Ruse	8−1	Svetkavitsa Targovishte
FC 13 Sofia	bye	
Skobelev-Pobeda 39 Pleven	bye	
Botev Yambol	bye	

== Quarter-finals ==
Team 1	Score	Team 2
Pobeda Varna	1−0	Skobelev-Pobeda 39 Pleven
FC 13 Sofia	7−2	Botev Yambol
Sportklub Plovdiv	4−1	Tritsvet Chirpan
Bdin Vidin	1−4	Levski Ruse

== Semi-finals ==
Team 1	Score	Team 2
Levski Ruse	2−0	Sportklub Plovdiv
FC 13 Sofia	2−0	Pobeda Varna

== Final ==
=== Details ===
13 October 1940
15:30 EEST

FC 13 Sofia	2–1	Sportklub Plovdiv
Nikolaev 27'; Stoichkov 85'		Bazovski 13' (o.g.)

Levski Playground, Sofia
Attendance: 0
Referee: Stefan Chumpalov (Sofia)

FC 13	Sportklub
