= 1960–61 Bulgarian Cup =

Tournament details
- Country: Bulgaria

Final positions
- Champions: CSKA Sofia (4th cup)
- Runners-up: Spartak Varna

The 1960–61 Bulgarian Cup was the 21st season of the Bulgarian Cup (in this period the tournament was named Cup of the Soviet Army). CSKA Sofia won the competition, beating Spartak Varna 3–0 in the final at the Vasil Levski National Stadium.

== First round ==
Team 1	Score	Team 2
Pirin Blagoevgrad	3–1	Spartak Plovdiv
Spartak Varna	2–0	Chernomorets Burgas
Marek Dupnitsa	2–0	Dimitrovgrad
Beroe Stara Zagora	2–0	Arda Kardzhali
Minyor Pernik	5–1	Yantra Gabrovo
Botev Plovdiv	5–1	Shumen
Botev Vratsa	1–0	Litex Lovech
Septemvri Sofia	4–1	Mesokombinat Ruse
Slavia Sofia	9–0	Hebar Pazardzhik
Lokomotiv Sofia	2–0	Tundzha Yambol
Levski Sofia	5–1	Metalurg Pernik
Etar Veliko Tarnovo	1–0	Septemvri Varna
CSKA Sofia	8–0	Gen Blagoy Ivanov
Cherno More Varna	2–1	Gigant Saedinenie
Sliven	1–0	Minyor Bobov Dol

== Second round ==
Pirin Blagoevgrad were given bye into the quarterfinals as both possible opponents were kicked out of the tournament in the previous round.

Team 1	Score	Team 2
CSKA Sofia	8–0	Marek Dupnitsa
Etar Veliko Tarnovo	4–2	Minyor Pernik
Botev Vratsa	1–0	Slavia Sofia
Botev Plovdiv	2–1	Septemvri Sofia
Lokomotiv Sofia	4–0	Beroe Stara Zagora
Levski Sofia	2–1	Cherno More Varna
Spartak Varna	1–0	Sliven

== Quarter-finals ==
Team 1	Score	Team 2
CSKA Sofia	3–1	Pirin Blagoevgrad
Botev Vratsa	6–0	Etar Veliko Tarnovo
Botev Plovdiv	3–2	Lokomotiv Sofia
Spartak Varna	1–0	Levski Sofia

== Semi-finals ==
Team 1	Score	Team 2
CSKA Sofia	3–1	Botev Vratsa
Spartak Varna	2–1	Botev Plovdiv

== Final ==
=== Details ===
28 June 1961

CSKA Sofia	3−0	Spartak Varna
Rankov 59'; Tsanev 69'; Kolev 71'

Vasil Levski National Stadium, Sofia
Attendance: 25,000
Referee: Petar Dzhonev (Plovdiv)

CSKA	Spartak
