= 1992–93 B Group =

Season of the Bulgarian B Football Group

Bulgarian B Group
- Season: 1992–93
- Champions: Cherno More
- Promoted: Cherno More; Shumen
- Relegated: None
- Matches: 380
- Goals: 965 (2.54 per match)

The 1992–93 B Group was the 37th season of the Bulgarian B Football Group, the second tier of the Bulgarian football league system. A total of 19 teams contested the league.

== League table ==
Pos	Team	Pld	W	D	L	GF	GA	GD	Pts	Promotion
1	Cherno More Varna (P)	38	23	7	8	67	31	+36	53	Promotion to 1993–94 A Group
2	Shumen (P)	38	24	4	10	69	31	+38	52	Promotion to 1993–94 A Group
3	LEX Lovech	38	20	10	8	63	32	+31	50	
4	Rilski Sportist	38	17	10	11	56	52	+4	44	
5	Montana	38	18	5	15	59	42	+17	41	
6	Akademik Svishtov	38	17	7	14	46	37	+9	41	
7	Spartak Pleven	38	16	9	13	56	54	+2	41	
8	Neftochimic Burgas	38	15	10	13	48	39	+9	40	
9	Belasitsa Petrich	38	16	7	15	55	51	+4	39	
10	Svetkavitsa Targovishte	38	15	9	14	48	47	+1	39	
11	Spartak Plovdiv	38	15	8	15	50	40	+10	38	
12	Dunav Ruse	38	15	7	16	45	55	−10	37	
13	Rozova Dolina Kazanlak	38	15	6	17	43	50	−7	36	
14	Dorostol Silistra	38	13	8	17	40	50	−10	34	
15	Minyor Pernik	38	11	12	15	35	48	−13	34	
16	Nesebar	38	11	12	15	41	59	−18	34	
17	Hebar Pazardzhik	38	13	7	18	51	56	−5	33	
18	Botev Vratsa	38	11	8	19	39	54	−15	30	
19	Korabostroitel Ruse	38	9	7	22	29	54	−25	25	
20	Bdin Vidin	38	5	9	24	25	83	−58	19	

Source: todor66.com
Rules for classification: 1) points; 2) goal difference; 3) number of goals scored.
(P) Promoted
