= 1938 Bulgarian Cup =

1938 Tsar's Cup
Царска купа

Tournament details
- Country: Bulgaria

Final positions
- Champions: FC 13 Sofia (1st cup)
- Runners-up: Levski Ruse

Tournament statistics
- Top goal scorer(s): Krum Stoichkov (FC 13) (5 goals)

The 1938 Bulgarian Cup (in this period the tournament was named Tsar's Cup) was the first Bulgarian Cup, which took place in parallel to the national championship. The cup was won by FC 13 Sofia after their opponents Levski Ruse left the field during the final at the Yunak Stadium in Sofia.

== First round ==
Team 1	Score	Team 2
4 September 1938
FC 13 Sofia	3–0 (w/o)	FC Lom
Tsar Krum Byala Slatina	0–3 (w/o)	Levski Pleven
Sportklub Tryavna	3–1	Svetoslav Stara Zagora
Levski Dupnitsa	3–1	Pirin XI
Levski Ruse	7–5	Hadzhislavchev Pavlikeni
Pobeda Varna	4–0	Nikola Simov Targovishte
Georgi Drazhev Yambol	0–4	Levski Burgas
Sportklub Plovdiv	5–0	Bulgaria Haskovo

== Quarter-finals ==
Team 1	Score	Team 2
11 September 1938
Pobeda Varna	2–3	Levski Pleven
Levski Burgas	3–0	Sportklub Tryavna
Levski Dupnitsa	0–1	FC 13 Sofia
Sportklub Plovdiv	1–2	Levski Ruse

== Semi-finals ==
Team 1	Score	Team 2
18 September 1938
Levski Ruse	6–3	Levski Burgas
Levski Pleven	1–7	FC 13 Sofia

== Final ==
=== Details ===
3 October 1938

FC 13 Sofia	3–0 (w/o)	Levski Ruse
Asparuhov 16'; Tabakov 31'; Stoichkov 80'	In 80th minute the match was canceled by Levski's players at 3−1 for FC 13 as a protest against refereeing	Toporov 8'

Yunak Stadium, Sofia
Attendance: 10,000
Referee: Vasil Kavaldzhiev (Pleven)

FC 13	Levski
