= Tsvetan Iliev =

Bulgarian footballer

Personal information
- Full name: Tsvetan Miroslavov Iliev
- Date of birth: 29 April 1990 (age 36)
- Place of birth: Bulgaria
- Height: 1.79 m (5 ft 10 1/2 in)
- Position: Midfielder

Team information
- Current team: Volov Shumen 2007 (player-manager)

Senior career*
| Years | Team | Apps | (Gls) |
| 2008–2013 | Svetkavitsa | 101 | (18) |
| 2013 | Neftochimic 1986 | 1 | (0) |
| 2014–2016 | Svetkavitsa | 77 | (40) |
| 2017–2020 | Chernomorets Balchik | 71 | (9) |
| 2020–2021 | Dobrudzha | 26 | (3) |
| 2021–2023 | Spartak Varna | 43 | (2) |
| 2023 | Chernomorets Balchik | 10 | (0) |
| 2023–2024 | Svetkavitsa | 6 | (2) |
| 2024– | Volov Shumen 2007 | 14 | (3) |

Managerial career
- 2024–: Volov Shumen 2007 (player-manager)
- * Club domestic league appearances and goals as of 08:13, 10 December 2024 (UTC)

Tsvetan Iliev (Bulgarian: Цветан Илиев; born 29 April 1990) is a Bulgarian football player, currently playing as a midfielder for Volov Shumen 2007 and also is the manager of the club.

== Career ==
On 1 April 2012, Tsvetan Iliev scored a historic goal to help Svetkavitsa to a 1–0 win over Kaliakra Kavarna – this was the first occasion on which the team from Targovishte managed to defeat an opponent an A PFG match.
