= 1978–79 Bulgarian Cup =

Tournament details
- Country: Bulgaria

Final positions
- Champions: Levski Sofia (14th cup)
- Runners-up: Beroe Stara Zagora

Tournament statistics
- Top goal scorer(s): Petko Petkov (Beroe) (7 goals)

The 1978–79 Bulgarian Cup was the 39th season of the Bulgarian Cup (in this period the tournament was named Cup of the Soviet Army). Levski Sofia won the competition, beating Beroe Stara Zagora 4–1 in the final at the Vasil Levski National Stadium.

== First round ==
Team 1	Score	Team 2
9–10 December 1978
Minyor Radnevo	4–1	Rozova Dolina
Levski Sofia	2–1	Chepinets Velingrad
Litex Lovech	5–1	Belasitsa Petrich
Akademik Sofia	2–1	Benkovski Isperih
Akademik Svishtov	5–1	Chumerna Elena
Maritsa Plovdiv	1–1 (a.e.t.) (4–5 p)	Chernomorets Burgas
Chirpan	6–1	Rodopa Smolyan
Haskovo	3–1	Ludogorets Razgrad
Velbazhd Kyustendil	3–1	Arda Kardzhali
Minyor Pernik	7–3	Slivnishki Geroy
Trakia Stamboliyski	2–5	CSKA Sofia
Svetkavitsa	1–1 (a.e.t.) (4–5 p)	Hebar Pazardzhik
Benkovski Teteven	2–3 (a.e.t.)	Botev Plovdiv
Devnya	0–5	Cherno More Varna
Kremikovtsi	3–0	Nesebar
Montana	4–2 (a.e.t.)	Levski Karlovo
Pavlikeni	2–4	Dimitrovgrad
Dunav Ruse	0–2	Slavia Sofia
Botev Ihtiman	2–1	Bdin Vidin
Pirin Blagoevgrad	7–1	Gigant Belene
Asenovets Asenovgrad	2–0	Etar Veliko Tarnovo
Beloslav	4–2	Minyor Bobov Dol
Chavdar Troyan	2–0	Rakovski Sevlievo
Vihren Sandanski	0–0 (a.e.t.) (4–1 p)	Spartak Pleven
Yantra Gabrovo	3–1	Levski Levski
Balkan Botevgrad	2–2 (a.e.t.) (3–4 p)	Botev Vratsa
Beroe Stara Zagora	2–0	Dobrudzha Dobrich
Spartak Varna	2–0	Lokomotiv GO
Lokomotiv Sofia	1–0	Tundzha Yambol
Lokomotiv Plovdiv	3–1 (a.e.t.)	Minyor Buhovo
Lokomotiv Ruse	3–1	Shumen

== Second round ==
Team 1	Score	Team 2
16 December 1978
Minyor Radnevo	0–1	Lokomotiv Sofia
Levski Sofia	2–0	Litex Lovech
Akademik Sofia	6–1	Lokomotiv Ruse
Akademik Svishtov	2–1	Lokomotiv Plovdiv
Chernomorets Burgas	3–1	Chirpan
Haskovo	4–1	Velbazhd Kyustendil
Minyor Pernik	1–2	CSKA Sofia
Hebar Pazardzhik	2–1	Botev Plovdiv
Cherno More Varna	4–2	Kremikovtsi
Marek Dupnitsa	3–1	Montana
Dimitrovgrad	1–4	Slavia Sofia
Botev Ihtiman	2–1	Pirin Blagoevgrad
Beroe Stara Zagora	2–0	Spartak Varna
Asenovets Asenovgrad	4–1	Beloslav
Chavdar Troyan	4–2 (a.e.t.)	Vihren Sandanski
Yantra Gabrovo	1–2	Botev Vratsa

== Third round ==
Team 1	Score	Team 2	Place
23 December 1978
Cherno More Varna	0–1	Marek Dupnitsa	Plovdiv
Lokomotiv Sofia	0–1	Levski Sofia	Sofia
Akademik Sofia	1–1 (a.e.t.) (5–4 p)	Akademik Svishtov	Botevgrad
Chernomorets Burgas	2–2 (a.e.t.) (2–3 p)	Haskovo	Belovo
Asenovets Asenovgrad	1–1 (a.e.t.) (1–3 p)	Chavdar Troyan	Stara Zagora
Slavia Sofia	2–1	Botev Ihtiman	Dupnitsa
Botev Vratsa	2–4	Beroe Stara Zagora	Sevlievo
CSKA Sofia	3–1	Hebar Pazardzhik	Blagoevgrad

== Quarter-finals ==
Team 1	Score	Team 2	Place
3 February 1979
Levski Sofia	2–0	Akademik Sofia	Sofia
Chavdar Troyan	0–2	Beroe Stara Zagora	Yambol
Marek Dupnitsa	1–1 (a.e.t.) (5–4 p)	Slavia Sofia	Velingrad
Haskovo	0–1	CSKA Sofia	Karlovo

== Semi-finals ==
Team 1	Score	Team 2	Place
4 April 1979
Levski Sofia	2–1	CSKA Sofia	Sofia
Beroe Stara Zagora	3–2 (a.e.t.)	Marek Dupnitsa	Plovdiv

== Third place play-off ==
Team 1	Score	Team 2
1979
Marek Dupnitsa	1–0	CSKA Sofia

== Final ==
=== Details ===
23 May 1979

Levski Sofia	4−1	Beroe Stara Zagora
Panov 30', 60', 68'; Gochev 47'		Stoyanov 29'

Vasil Levski National Stadium, Sofia
Attendance: 40,000
Referee: Anatoli Kadetov (Soviet Union)

Levski	Beroe
