= 1954 Bulgarian Cup =

Tournament details
- Country: Bulgaria

Final positions
- Champions: CSKA Sofia (2nd cup)
- Runners-up: Slavia Sofia

Tournament statistics
- Top goal scorer(s): Dimitar Milanov (CSKA) (4 goals)

The 1954 Bulgarian Cup was the 14th season of the Bulgarian Cup (in this period the tournament was named Cup of the Soviet Army). CSKA Sofia won the competition, beating Slavia Sofia 2–1 in the final at the Vasil Levski National Stadium in Sofia.

== First round ==
Team 1	Score	Team 2
Spartak Plovdiv	2–1	Torpedo Pleven
Dimitrovgrad	3–0	Pirin Blagoevgrad
Shumen	1–5	Lokomotiv Sofia
Vihar Aytos	2–1	Etar Veliko Tarnovo
Dobrudzha Dobrich	0–1	Lokomotiv Plovdiv
Dorostol Silistra	1–4	Zavod 12 Sofia
Sliven	3–0	Marek Dupnitsa
Minyor Pernik	5–2	Septemvri Pleven
Urozhay Pordim	0–3	Spartak Pleven
Levski Sofia	6–1	Spartak Varna
Beroe Stara Zagora	1–2	VVS Sofia

== Second round ==
Team 1	Score	Team 2
Velbazhd Kyustendil	5–1	Vihar Aytos
Minyor Pernik	2–0	Levski Sofia
Spartak Pleven	1–2	Spartak Plovdiv
Slavia Sofia	1–0	Zavod 12 Sofia
VVS Sofia	0–1	Sliven
Lokomotiv Plovdiv	7–0	Dimitrovgrad
CSKA Sofia	4–2	Cherno More Varna
Lokomotiv Sofia	3–0 (w/o)	Botev Vratsa

== Quarter-finals ==
Team 1	Score	Team 2
Slavia Sofia	3–0	Velbazhd Kyustendil
Spartak Plovdiv	0–2	CSKA Sofia
Sliven	2–0	Minyor Pernik
Lokomotiv Plovdiv	1–0 (a.e.t.)	Lokomotiv Sofia

== Semi-finals ==
Team 1	Score	Team 2
CSKA Sofia	1–0	Lokomotiv Plovdiv
Sliven	0–1 (a.e.t.)	Slavia Sofia

== Final ==
=== Details ===
7 November 1954

CSKA Sofia	2−1	Slavia Sofia
Milanov 21', 31'		Goranov 37' (pen.)

Vasil Levski National Stadium, Sofia
Attendance: 30,000
Referee: Todor Stoyanov (Sofia)

CSKA	Slavia
