= 1939 Bulgarian Cup =

1939 Tsar's Cup
Царска купа

Tournament details
- Country: Bulgaria

Final positions
- Champions: Shipka Sofia (1st cup)
- Runners-up: Levski Ruse

Tournament statistics
- Top goal scorer(s): Dimitar Nikolaev (Levski Ruse) (4 goals)

The 1939 Bulgarian Cup (in this period the tournament was named Tsar's Cup) was the second cup competition, which took place in parallel to the national championship. The cup was won by Shipka Sofia who beat Levski Ruse 2–0 in the final at the Levski Playground in Sofia.

== First round ==
Team 1	Score	Team 2
Belite orli Pleven	4–1	Tsar Krum Byala Slatina
Orlovets Gabrovo	3–2	DVF Kazanlak
Georgi Drazhev Yambol	6–2	Levski Karlovo
Botev Haskovo	3–2	Botev Plovdiv
Levski Ruse	3–2	Hadzhislavchev Pavlikeni
Han Omurtag Shumen	0–1	Pobeda Varna
Shipka Sofia	4–0	Krakra Pernik
FC Lom	bye	

== Quarter-finals ==
Team 1	Score	Team 2
Pobeda Varna	3–1	Orlovets Gabrovo
Botev Haskovo	1–2	Drazhev Yambol
Shipka Sofia	1–1	FC Lom
Belite orli Pleven	1–7	Levski Ruse
Replay
Shipka Sofia	3–1	FC Lom

== Semi-finals ==
Team 1	Score	Team 2
Levski Ruse	2–1	Pobeda Varna
Shipka Sofia	5–2	Drazhev Yambol

== Final ==
=== Details ===
3 October 1939

Shipka Sofia	2−0	Levski Ruse
Tashkov 18'; Petkov 40'

Levski Playground, Sofia
Attendance: 4,000
Referee: Dimitar Genchev (Sofia)

Shipka	Levski
