= Milcho Goranov =

Bulgarian footballer (1928–2008)

Personal information
- Date of birth: 6 November 1928
- Place of birth: Lom, Bulgaria
- Date of death: 28 July 2008 (aged 79)
- Place of death: Sofia, Bulgaria
- Position: Defender

Senior career*
Years	Team	Apps	(Gls)
1944–1949	Republikanets Lom	?	(?)
1949–1962	Slavia Sofia	199	(5)

International career
1950–1957	Bulgaria	21	(0)
- * Club domestic league appearances and goals

Milcho Goranov (Bulgarian: Милчо Горанов, 6 November 1928 – 28 July 2008) was a Bulgarian footballer who played as a defender, most notably for Slavia Sofia. Goranov also earned 21 caps for Bulgaria. He competed in the men's tournament at the 1956 Summer Olympics.

== Honours ==
=== Club ===
Slavia Sofia

- Bulgarian Cup: 1952

=== International ===
Bulgaria

- Olympic Bronze Medal: 1956
