= 1970–71 Bulgarian Cup =

Tournament details
- Country: Bulgaria

Final positions
- Champions: Levski Sofia (11th cup)
- Runners-up: Lokomotiv Plovdiv

Tournament statistics
- Top goal scorer: Kiril Milanov (Marek)

The 1970–71 Bulgarian Cup was the 31st season of the Bulgarian Cup (in this period the tournament was named Cup of the Soviet Army). Levski Sofia won the competition, beating Lokomotiv Plovdiv 3–0 in the final at the Bulgarian Army Stadium.

== First round ==
Team 1	Score	Team 2
16 December 1970
Akademik Sofia	2–1	Beroe Stara Zagora
Levski Sofia	1–0	Minyor Pernik
Rodopa Smolyan	0–3	CSKA Sofia
Etar Veliko Tarnovo	2–2 (7–6 p)	Slivnishki Geroy
Lokomotiv Plovdiv	3–0	Dobrudzha Dobrich
Spartak Pleven	1–0	Ludogorets Razgrad
Botev Vratsa	4–2	Lokomotiv Mezdra
Chernolomets Popovo	1–7	Marek Dupnitsa
Dunav Ruse	2–0	Dimitrovgrad
Dorostol Silistra	0–1	Cherno More Varna
Yantra Gabrovo	4–0	Shumen
Spartak Varna	3–0	Maritsa Plovdiv
Akademik Svishtov	1–0	Slavia Sofia
Bdin Vidin	2–0	Tundzha Yambol
Velbazhd Kyustendil	0–1	Botev Plovdiv
Chernomorets Burgas	3–1	Rakovski Sevlievo

== Group stage ==
=== Group 1 ===
Matches were played in Pazardzhik and Velingrad

Team 1	Score	Team 2
20–28 February 1971
Levski Sofia	3–0	Dunav Ruse
Yantra Gabrovo	2–0	Bdin Vidin
Levski Sofia	2–0	Bdin Vidin
Yantra Gabrovo	1–1	Dunav Ruse
Yantra Gabrovo	1–0	Levski Sofia
Dunav Ruse	3–2	Bdin Vidin

Pos	Team	Pld	W	D	L	GF	GA	GD	Pts	Qualification
1	Yantra Gabrovo	3	2	1	0	4	1	+3	5	Quarter-finals
2	Levski Sofia	3	2	0	1	5	1	+4	4	Quarter-finals
3	Dunav Ruse	3	1	1	1	4	6	−2	3	
4	Bdin Vidin	3	0	0	3	2	7	−5	0	

=== Group 2 ===
Matches were played in Petrich and Sandanski

Team 1	Score	Team 2
20–28 February 1971
Spartak Pleven	3–0	Cherno More Varna
Marek Dupnitsa	1–0	Akademik Sofia
Marek Dupnitsa	1–1	Spartak Pleven
Akademik Sofia	1–0	Cherno More Varna
Spartak Pleven	0–0	Akademik Sofia
Marek Dupnitsa	2–0	Cherno More Varna

Pos	Team	Pld	W	D	L	GF	GA	GD	Pts	Qualification
1	Marek Dupnitsa	3	2	1	0	4	1	+3	5	Quarter-finals
2	Spartak Pleven	3	1	2	0	4	1	+3	4	Quarter-finals
3	Akademik Sofia	3	1	1	1	1	1	0	3	
4	Cherno More Varna	3	0	0	3	0	6	−6	0	

=== Group 3 ===
Matches were played in Stara Zagora and Nova Zagora

Team 1	Score	Team 2
20–28 February 1971
CSKA Sofia	0–0	Lokomotiv Plovdiv
Chernomorets Burgas	2–1	Spartak Varna
CSKA Sofia	4–1	Spartak Varna
Lokomotiv Plovdiv	7–0	Chernomorets Burgas
CSKA Sofia	4–1	Chernomorets Burgas
Lokomotiv Plovdiv	1–1	Spartak Varna

Pos	Team	Pld	W	D	L	GF	GA	GD	Pts	Qualification
1	CSKA Sofia	3	2	1	0	8	2	+6	5	Quarter-finals
2	Lokomotiv Plovdiv	3	1	2	0	8	1	+7	4	Quarter-finals
3	Chernomorets Burgas	3	1	0	2	3	12	−9	2	
4	Spartak Varna	3	0	1	2	3	7	−4	1	

=== Group 4 ===
Matches were played in Haskovo and Dimitrovgrad

Team 1	Score	Team 2
22–28 February 1971
Botev Vratsa	1–0	Akademik Svishtov
Botev Plovdiv	1–0	Etar Veliko Tarnovo
Etar Veliko Tarnovo	1–1	Botev Vratsa
Botev Plovdiv	4–2	Akademik Svishtov
Botev Vratsa	1–1	Botev Plovdiv
Etar Veliko Tarnovo	2–0	Akademik Svishtov

Pos	Team	Pld	W	D	L	GF	GA	GD	Pts	Qualification
1	Botev Plovdiv	3	2	1	0	6	3	+3	5	Quarter-finals
2	Botev Vratsa	3	1	2	0	3	2	+1	4	Quarter-finals
3	Etar Veliko Tarnovo	3	1	1	1	3	2	+1	3	
4	Akademik Svishtov	3	0	0	3	2	7	−5	0	

== Quarter-finals ==
Team 1	Score	Team 2	Place
14 April 1971
Lokomotiv Plovdiv	3–2	Yantra Gabrovo	Stara Zagora
Levski Sofia	2–2 (5–4 p)	CSKA Sofia	Sofia
Marek Dupnitsa	3–0	Botev Vratsa	Pazardzhik
Spartak Pleven	1–1 (6–5 p)	Botev Plovdiv	Botevgrad

== Semi-finals ==
Team 1	Score	Team 2	Place
16 June 1971
Levski Sofia	5–0	Marek Dupnitsa	Pernik
Lokomotiv Plovdiv	3–0	Spartak Pleven	Sofia

== Final ==
=== Details ===
25 August 1971

Levski Sofia	3−0	Lokomotiv Plovdiv
Tsvetkov 8'; Y. Kirilov 36'; P. Kirilov 38'

Bulgarian Army Stadium, Sofia
Attendance: 30,000
Referee: Atanas Mateev (Varna)

Levski	Lokomotiv
