= Georgi Sokolov =

Bulgarian footballer

Personal information
- Full name: Georgi Apostolov Sokolov
- Date of birth: 19 June 1942
- Place of birth: Sofia, Bulgaria
- Date of death: June 27, 2002 (aged 60)
- Positions: Winger; forward

Senior career*
| Years | Team | Apps | (Gls) |
| 1957 | Spartak Plovdiv | 1 | (0) |
| 1958–1969 | Levski Sofia | 186 | (58) |
| 1969 | Dunav Ruse | 7 | (0) |
| Total | | 194 | (58) |

International career
| 1959–1967 | Bulgaria | 14 | (5) |
- * Club domestic league appearances and goals

Georgi Apostolov Sokolov (Bulgarian: Георги Апостолов Соколов; 19 June 1942 - 27 June 2002) was a Bulgarian international footballer. A forward with remarkable ball control, imagination, dribbling skills and feints, Sokolov is regarded as one of the most talented Bulgarian footballers of all time. His father was the great Bulgarian goalkeeper Apostol Sokolov. Apostol was known as the first one to leave the goal line like modern keepers; he was also an inspiration for Lev Yashin.

Sokolov spent the majority of his playing career with Levski Sofia, winning two A Group titles and two Bulgarian Cups. At the international level, he represented Bulgaria at the 1962 FIFA World Cup.

== Career ==
=== Club career ===
Sokolov started his career with Spartak Plovdiv (under his father's Apostol Sokolov management). On 1 December 1957, he made his debut against Spartak Pleven to become the A Group's youngest ever player at the age of 15 years, 5 months and 12 days old.

In early 1958, Sokolov joined Levski Sofia. He made his debut for the club in a friendly against Chelsea in Sofia on 17 August 1958. Two weeks later, he made his league debut for Levski in a 0–0 draw against Spartak Varna at the age of 16 years, 2 months and 12 days old. Sokolov spent 11 seasons with Levski, scoring 83 goals in 239 matches in all competitions. On 12 September 1965, he scored the club's first ever goal in the European Cup in a 2–1 away loss against Djurgårdens IF. In the second leg game, Levski eliminated the Swedish champions.

=== International career ===
Sokolov played a key role in Bulgaria winning the 1959 UEFA European Under-18 Championship on home soil. He scored goal in the team's opening group stage match against the Netherlands. Bulgaria won the match 3–1. Sokolov also scored against East Germany in the semi-finals.

One month later, Sokolov received his first call-up to the senior Bulgaria squad. On 13 May 1959, he became Bulgaria's youngest ever senior player by appearing in a 3–2 friendly win over Netherlands at Vasil Levski National Stadium aged 16 years, 10 months and 27 days. He participated in the 1962 FIFA World Cup, and scored Bulgaria's first ever World Cup goal, in a 6–1 loss against Hungary.

== Legacy ==
On 25 June 2022, Levski Sofia played a game against Macedonian club Akademija Pandev, which Levski won 3–1 to win a trophy in Sokolov's honor, named after him.

== Honours ==
=== Club ===
Levski Sofia

- A Group (2): 1964–65, 1967–68
- Bulgarian Cup (2): 1959, 1967
