= 1968–69 Bulgarian Cup =

Tournament details
- Country: Bulgaria

Final positions
- Champions: CSKA Sofia (6th cup)
- Runners-up: Levski Sofia

The 1968–69 Bulgarian Cup was the 29th season of the Bulgarian Cup (in this period the tournament was named Cup of the Soviet Army). CSKA Sofia won the competition, beating Levski Sofia 2–1 in the final at the Vasil Levski National Stadium.

== First round ==
Team 1	Agg.	Team 2	1st leg	2nd leg
Ludogorets Razgrad	1–5	Levski Sofia	1–1	0–4
Sliven	4–4 (7–8 p)	Chernomorets Burgas	1–0	3–4
Montana	1–2	Spartak Pleven	1–0	0–2
Lokomotiv Burgas	2–2 (6–7p)	Dobrudzha Dobrich	1–0	1–2
Yantra Gabrovo	1–6	Dunav Ruse	1–1	0–5
Spartak Sofia	13–4	Kremikovtsi	7–0	6–4
Litex Lovech	5–10	Minyor Pernik	2–2	3–8
Beloslav	2–7	Lokomotiv Sofia	2–1	0–6
Etar Veliko Tarnovo	2–6	Cherno More Varna	1–3	1–3
Haskovo	2–5	Lokomotiv Plovdiv	2–2	0–3
Bdin Vidin	4–9	Botev Vratsa	2–4	2–5
Pirin Blagoevgrad	1–9	Marek Dupnitsa	1–4	0–5
Tundzha Yambol	4–6	Beroe Stara Zagora	2–1	2–5
Svoboda Peshtera	2–19	CSKA Sofia	0–15	2–4
Lokomotiv Stara Zagora	1–5	Botev Plovdiv	1–3	0–2
Shumen	1–6	Slavia Sofia	0–3	1–3

== Group stage ==
=== Group 1 ===
Matches were played in Pazardzhik and Velingrad

Team 1	Score	Team 2
CSKA Sofia	3–1	Marek Dupnitsa
Beroe Stara Zagora	1–0	Chernomorets Burgas
Chernomorets Burgas	1–0	CSKA Sofia
Marek Dupnitsa	2–1	Beroe Stara Zagora
CSKA Sofia	0–0	Beroe Stara Zagora
Chernomorets Burgas	0–0	Marek Dupnitsa

Pos	Team	Pld	W	D	L	GF	GA	GD	Pts	Qualification
1	CSKA Sofia	3	1	1	1	3	2	+1	3	Semi-finals
2	Beroe Stara Zagora	3	1	1	1	2	2	0	3	
3	Chernomorets Burgas	3	1	1	1	1	1	0	3	
4	Marek Dupnitsa	3	1	1	1	3	4	−1	3	

=== Group 2 ===
Matches were played in Blagoevgrad, Dupnitsa and Sofia

Team 1	Score	Team 2
Levski Sofia	1–1	Botev Vratsa
Dunav Ruse	2–1	Akademik Sofia
Levski Sofia	3–1	Dunav Ruse
Akademik Sofia	4–1	Botev Vratsa
Levski Sofia	3–2	Akademik Sofia
Dunav Ruse	1–0	Botev Vratsa

Pos	Team	Pld	W	D	L	GF	GA	GD	Pts	Qualification
1	Levski Sofia	3	2	1	0	7	4	+3	5	Semi-finals
2	Dunav Ruse	3	2	0	1	4	4	0	4	
3	Akademik Sofia	3	1	0	2	7	6	+1	2	
4	Botev Vratsa	3	0	1	2	2	6	−4	1	

=== Group 3 ===
Matches were played in Sliven, Stara Zagora and Nova Zagora

Team 1	Score	Team 2
Lokomotiv Plovdiv	2–0	Spartak Pleven
Lokomotiv Plovdiv	2–0	Dobrudzha Dobrich
Spartak Pleven	1–0	Dobrudzha Dobrich

Pos	Team	Pld	W	D	L	GF	GA	GD	Pts	Qualification
1	Lokomotiv Plovdiv	2	2	0	0	4	0	+4	4	Semi-finals
2	Spartak Pleven	2	1	0	1	1	2	−1	2	
3	Dobrudzha Dobrich	2	0	0	2	0	3	−3	0	

=== Group 4 ===
Matches were played in Haskovo, Dimitrovgrad and Harmanli

Team 1	Score	Team 2
Botev Plovdiv	2–1	Slavia Sofia
Minyor Pernik	2–1	Cherno More Varna
Botev Plovdiv	3–0	Cherno More Varna
Minyor Pernik	1–1	Slavia Sofia
Botev Plovdiv	1–0	Minyor Pernik
Slavia Sofia	4–0	Cherno More Varna

Pos	Team	Pld	W	D	L	GF	GA	GD	Pts	Qualification
1	Botev Plovdiv	3	3	0	0	6	1	+5	6	Semi-finals
2	Slavia Sofia	3	1	1	1	6	3	+3	3	
3	Minyor Pernik	3	1	1	1	3	3	0	3	
4	Cherno More Varna	3	0	0	3	1	9	−8	0	

== Semi-finals ==
Team 1	Score	Team 2	Place
CSKA Sofia	1–0	Lokomotiv Plovdiv	Pleven
Levski Sofia	3–1	Botev Plovdiv	Burgas

== Final ==
=== Details ===
30 April 1969

CSKA Sofia	2−1	Levski Sofia
Marashliev 50'; Zhekov 86'		Mitkov 20'

Vasil Levski National Stadium, Sofia
Attendance: 40,000
Referee: Todor Gerov (Sofia)

CSKA	Levski
