= 1959–60 Bulgarian Cup =

Tournament details
- Country: Bulgaria

Final positions
- Champions: Septemvri Sofia (1st cup)
- Runners-up: Lokomotiv Plovdiv

Tournament statistics
- Top goal scorer(s): Tsvetan Milev (Septemvri) (7 goals)

The 1959–60 Bulgarian Cup was the 20th season of the Bulgarian Cup (in this period the tournament was named Cup of the Soviet Army). Septemvri Sofia won the competition, beating Lokomotiv Plovdiv 4–3 after extra time in the final at the Vasil Levski National Stadium.

== First round ==
Team 1	Score	Team 2
Lokomotiv Sofia	15–0	Botev Devin
Levski Sofia	2–0	Spartak Sofia
Shumen	0–2	Zavod Ernst Telman
Etar Veliko Tarnovo	1–0	Yantra Gabrovo
Botev Plovdiv	4–0	Zavod Karl Marx Devnya
Beroe Stara Zagora	0–0 (a.e.t.)^{1}	Slavia Sofia
Botev Vratsa	2–3	Septemvri Sofia
Panayot Hitov Tutrakan	1–3	Spartak Plovdiv
Tundzha Yambol	4–2	Litex Lovech
Arda Kardzhali	4–1	Chernomorets Burgas
Montana	4–3	Botev Novi Pazar
Ludogorets Razgrad	5–3	Benkovski Byala
Minyor Pernik	2–1	Cherno More Varna
Lokomotiv Plovdiv	7–2	Dunav Ruse
CSKA Sofia	2–1	Spartak Varna
Velbazhd Kyustendil	3–1 (a.e.t.)	Spartak Pleven

- ^{1}Slavia qualified by drawing of lots.

== Second round ==
Team 1	Score	Team 2
Spartak Plovdiv	2–0	Levski Sofia
Slavia Sofia	3–0	Zavod Ernst Telman
Velbazhd Kyustendil	2–2 (a.e.t.)^{1}	Lokomotiv Plovdiv
Tundzha Yambol	1–1 (a.e.t.)^{2}	Minyor Pernik
Arda Kardzhali	4–1	Montana
Etar Veliko Tarnovo	2–1	Lokomotiv Sofia
Ludogorets Razgrad	2–6	Septemvri Sofia
CSKA Sofia	3–1	Botev Plovdiv

- ^{1}Lokomotiv qualified by drawing of lots.
- ^{2}Tundzha qualified by drawing of lots.

== Quarter-finals ==
Team 1	Score	Team 2
Lokomotiv Plovdiv	2–1	Tundzha Yambol
Spartak Plovdiv	2–1	Slavia Sofia
CSKA Sofia	1–2 (a.e.t.)	Etar Veliko Tarnovo
Septemvri Sofia	3–1	Arda Kardzhali

== Semi-finals ==
Team 1	Score	Team 2
Lokomotiv Plovdiv	1–1 (a.e.t.)^{1}	Spartak Plovdiv
Etar Veliko Tarnovo	1–3	Septemvri Sofia

- ^{1}Lokomotiv qualified by drawing of lots.

== Final ==
=== Details ===
15 June 1960

Septemvri Sofia	4−3 (a.e.t.)	Lokomotiv Plovdiv
Dzhordzhilov 5', 48'; Yosifov 43'; Milev 120'		Grancharov 28'; Genov 62'; Kanchev 65'

Vasil Levski National Stadium, Sofia
Attendance: 25,000
Referee: Georgi Hristov (Sofia)

Septemvri	Lokomotiv
