= 1951 Bulgarian Cup =

Tournament details
- Country: Bulgaria

Final positions
- Champions: CSKA Sofia (1st cup)
- Runners-up: Akademik Sofia

Tournament statistics
- Top goal scorer(s): Milanov (CSKA); Stefanov (CSKA); Samsarov (Akademik) (3 goals)

The 1951 Bulgarian Cup was the 11th season of the Bulgarian Cup (in this period the tournament was named Cup of the Soviet Army). CSKA Sofia won the competition, beating Akademik Sofia 1–0 after extra time in the final at the People's Army Stadium in Sofia.

== First round ==
Team 1	Score	Team 2
CSKA Sofia	4–0	Cherno More Varna
Minyor Pernik	1–2	Spartak Pleven
Dunav Ruse	0–2	Levski Sofia
Rilski Sportist	1–0 (a.e.t.)	Torpedo Pleven
Cherveno Zname Sofia	5–2	Spartak Varna
Stroitel Sofia	3–1	Lokomotiv Sofia
Lokomotiv Plovdiv	0–0 (a.e.t.)	Akademik Sofia
Botev Plovdiv	0–0 (a.e.t.)	Spartak Sofia
Replay
Lokomotiv Plovdiv	0–0 (a.e.t.)	Akademik Sofia
Botev Plovdiv	0–0 (a.e.t.)	Spartak Sofia
Second replay
Lokomotiv Plovdiv	0–2	Akademik Sofia
Botev Plovdiv	1–1 (a.e.t.)	Spartak Sofia
Third replay
Botev Plovdiv	1–2 (a.e.t.)	Spartak Sofia

== Quarter-finals ==
Team 1	Score	Team 2
Spartak Sofia	4–0	Rilski Sportist
CSKA Sofia	3–1	Stroitel Sofia
Levski Sofia	1–0	Cherveno Zname Sofia
Akademik Sofia	3–1	Spartak Pleven

== Semi-finals ==
Team 1	Score	Team 2
CSKA Sofia	3–0	Levski Sofia
Akademik Sofia	3–2	Spartak Sofia

== Final ==
=== Details ===
7 November 1951

CSKA Sofia	1−0 (a.e.t.)	Akademik Sofia
Milanov 104'

People's Army Stadium, Sofia
Attendance: 25,000
Referee: Andrey Zlatarev (Sofia)

CSKA	Akademik
