= 1969–70 Bulgarian Cup =

Tournament details
- Country: Bulgaria

Final positions
- Champions: Levski Sofia (10th cup)
- Runners-up: CSKA Sofia

The 1969–70 Bulgarian Cup was the 30th season of the Bulgarian Cup (in this period the tournament was named Cup of the Soviet Army). Levski Sofia won the competition, beating CSKA Sofia 2–1 in the final at the Vasil Levski National Stadium.

== First round ==
Team 1	Score	Team 2
Metalurg Eliseyna	1–2	Akademik Sofia
Lokomotiv Ruse	0–2	Spartak Pleven
Minyor Rudozem	1–0	Maritsa Plovdiv
Aviotehnik Plovdiv	1–5	Botev Plovdiv
Arda Kardzhali	1–0	Lokomotiv Plovdiv
Minyor Chiprovtsi	0–0 (1–3 p)	Botev Vratsa
Shumen	1–0	Dunav Ruse
Gigant Belene	2–2 (6–7 p)	Minyor Pernik
Pavlikeni	1–2	Etar Veliko Tarnovo
Lokomotiv Burgas	0–1	Chernomorets Burgas
Sliven	0–0 (5–5 p)^{1}	Beroe Stara Zagora
Pirin Blagoevgrad	1–1 (4–5 p)	Marek Dupnitsa
Minyor Buhovo	1–6	Slavia Sofia
Spartak Varna	1–2	Cherno More Varna
Yuri Gagarin Kurilo	0–7	Levski Sofia
Benkovski Negovantsi	0–5	CSKA Sofia

- ^{1}Sliven qualified by drawing lots.

== Second round ==
Team 1	Score	Team 2
CSKA Sofia	5–0	Minyor Rudozem
Levski Sofia	4–0	Arda Kardzhali
Slavia Sofia	2–1	Shumen
Cherno More Varna	2–1	Akademik Sofia
Spartak Pleven	1–0	Minyor Pernik
Botev Plovdiv	3–1	Sliven
Botev Vratsa	2–3	Marek Dupnitsa
Chernomorets Burgas	1–2	Etar Veliko Tarnovo

== Quarter-finals ==
Team 1	Score	Team 2
Levski Sofia	5–1	Marek Dupnitsa
CSKA Sofia	5–1	Spartak Pleven
Slavia Sofia	2–1	Etar Veliko Tarnovo
Cherno More Varna	3–1	Botev Plovdiv

== Semi-finals ==
Team 1	Score	Team 2	Place
Levski Sofia	2–0	Slavia Sofia	Sofia
CSKA Sofia	4–0	Cherno More Varna	Stara Zagora

== Final ==
=== Details ===
25 August 1970

Levski Sofia	2−1	CSKA Sofia
Panov 11'; Veselinov 46'		B. Stankov 71'

Vasil Levski National Stadium, Sofia
Attendance: 45,000
Referee: Deyan Nachev (Plovdiv)

Levski	CSKA
