= FC Volov Shumen =

Volov Shumen 2007
- Full name: Football Club Volov Shumen 2007
- Nicknames: Пивоварите (The Brewers)
- Founded: December 1, 1929; 96 years ago as Panayot Volov
- Ground: Stadion Panayot Volov, Shumen
- Capacity: 24,390 (currently down to 3,500)
- Chairman: Ivan Stanchev
- Manager: Tsvetan Iliev
- League: Third League
- 2025-26: Third League, 4th
- Website: https://fcvolovshumen.com/
Home colours	Away colours

Football Club Volov Shumen 2007 (Bulgarian: Футболен Клуб Волов Шумен 2007) is a Bulgarian football club, playing in the city of Shumen, which currently competes in Third League, third tier of Bulgarian football. The club was established in 1929 under the name "Panayot Volov", and folded its senior team in 2014, before being 'refounded' in July 2018. In 2024 Volov merged with Shumen 2007 to form Volov Shumen 2007.

Shumen plays their home games on "Panayot Volov” stadium, with a historic capacity of 24,390 people and a current one of 3,500. The team's first kit colors are yellow and blue. Because of the city's famous brand of Shumensko beer, they are often affectionately called Пивоварите, or The Brewers.

== History ==
FC Shumen (then called Panayot Volov) participated in the State Championship as Shumen region champion in 1934–35 and reached the semifinals. The club was again champion of Shumen region in 1935–36 and 1936–37, but was eliminated during the first matches of the State Championship. The club subsequently went through further name changes, including to DFS Shumen in 1980, Madara Shumen in 1984, and FC Shumen in 1985.

After a successful spell in the Bulgarian A Professional Football Group during the early and late 1990s, which included a 4th-place finish in 1993–94, this led to a UEFA Cup participation. Shumen was drawn against Cypriot side Anorthosis Famagusta. Shumen lost both games, and were eliminated in their only European participation. In the upcoming years, the club lost its main sponsors and went bankrupt. A newly formed entity acquired its license and merged with Yunak Shumen in 2001, eventually becoming FC Shumen 2001. The club briefly returned to its original name of Panayot Volov in 2007, before entering financial difficulties once more and being renamed to Shumen 2010 as it was demoted to the V group, the third tier in Bulgarian football.

The club regained its position in professional football after a two-year absence by winning the 2011–12 Northeastern V Amateur Group, but finished 12th out of 14 teams in its first season back, and was relegated back to the third division for the 2013–14 season. Shumen 2010 finished 14th in the 2013/14 V AFG campaign, which meant they were relegated to the regional divisions. However, due to continuing financial difficulties the club folded before the start of the 2014/15 season, and fielded youth teams only in the following four seasons.

On 26 July 2018, the team was restored under the name Volov 1929 Shumen and filed a request for participation in the 2018–19 season of the Bulgarian Third League. On 30 July they were accepted, and faced Lokomotiv Ruse in their return to the 3rd division, losing the game 2–1. They were relegated at the end of the season, but returned to the Third League in the 2021–22 season.

PFC Shumen have played in the A Professional Group for a total of seven seasons: 1972–1973, 1983–1984, 1993–1996 and 1998–2000. The club reached the semifinals of the Bulgarian Cup on two occasions, in 1957 and 2006, when they narrowly lost 2:1 to Cherno More Varna after extra time.

== Honours ==
A PFG

- 4th place: 1993–94
- Semifinalist in the national championship: 1935

B PFG

- Champions (2): 1971–72, 1982–83
- Runners-up (5): 1953–54, 1956–57, 1980–81, 1981–82, 1992–93

North-East V AFG

- Champions (3): 1986–87, 1990–91, 2011–12

Bulgarian Cup

- Semi-finalists (2): 1956–57, 2005–06
- Quarter-finalists (4): 1956–57, 1975–76, 1999–00, 2005–06

== Players ==
=== Current squad ===
As of 29 July 2024

Note: Flags indicate national team as defined under FIFA eligibility rules; some limited exceptions apply. Players may hold more than one non-FIFA nationality.

No.	Pos.	Nation	Player
1	GK	BUL	Todor Todorov
2	DF	BUL	Dilyan Mikov
3	DF	BUL	Alex Todorov
3	DF	BUL	Aleksandar Tsankov
5	DF	BUL	Evgeni Stoyanov
6	DF	BUL	Simeon Savov
7	MF	BUL	Dimitar Ignatovski
8	FW	KOR	Ha Gin Li
9	FW	BUL	Svetlyo Vichev
10	MF	BUL	Hristo Stanchev
12	GK	BUL	Petar Iliev

No.	Pos.	Nation	Player
14	DF	BUL	Kyashif Fahredinov
15	MF	BUL	Radoslav Danchev
17	MF	BUL	Tsvetan Iliev
19	DF	BUL	Boyan Dimov
20	MF	BUL	Nikolay Borisov
25	MF	BUL	Nikola Nikolov
28	MF	BUL	Radoslav Kovachev
32	FW	BUL	Yordan Milkov
66	MF	BUL	Yakub Ramadanov
77	FW	BUL	Valentino Nikolaev
90	MF	BUL	Deniz Kadir

== Naming history ==
- Panayot Volov (Bulgarian: Панайот Волов) (December 1, 1929 - 1946)
- Yunak-Botev-Volov (Bulgarian: Юнак-Ботев-Волов) (1946 - 1947)
- Panayot Volov (Bulgarian: Панайот Волов) (1947 - 1980)
- FC Shumen (Bulgarian: ФК Шумен) (1980 - 1985)
- FC Madara (Bulgarian: ФК Мадара) (1985 - 1989)
- FC Shumen (1989 - 2001)
- Shumen 2001 (Bulgarian: Шумен 2001) (2001 - 2007)
- Panayot Volov (2007 - 2010)
- Makak 2008 (Bulgarian: Макак 2008) (2010 - 2011) (after split of "Makak" (Makak district, Shumen) from "OFG Shumen")
- Shumen 2010 (Bulgarian: Шумен 2010) (2011 - 2014) (after "Rapid" (Divdyadovo, Shumen) merged into club)
- Volov (Bulgarian: Волов) (2018 - 2024)
- Volov Shumen 2007 (Bulgarian: Волов Шумен 2007) (2024 - Present)

== Statistics ==
=== European record ===
UEFA Cup:

Season	Round	Country	Club	Home	Away	Aggregate
1994–95	Q	(Cyprus)	Anorthosis Famagusta	1–2	0–2	1–4

=== League season to season (1948-2026) ===
Season	Division	Place	Bulgarian Cup
1948–49	V AFG	?	DNQ
1950	B PFG	4	DNQ
1951	B PFG	11	DNQ
1952	V AFG	?	DNQ
1953	B PFG	3	DNQ
1954	B PFG	2	First Round
1955	B PFG	8	DNQ
1956	B PFG	4	DNQ
1957	B PFG	2	Semi-final
1958	B PFG	10	?
1958–59	B PFG	4	DNQ
1959–60	B PFG	4	First Round
1960–61	B PFG	16	?
1961–62	V AFG	?	First Round
1962–63	B PFG	8	DNQ
1963–64	B PFG	13	DNQ
1964–65	B PFG	?	DNQ
1965–66	B PFG	6	?
1966–67	B PFG	?	First Round
1967–68	B PFG	10	DNQ
1968–69	B PFG	11	First Round
1969–70	B PFG	18	Second Round

Season	Division	Place	Bulgarian Cup
1970–71	V AFG	?	First Round
1971–72	B PFG	1	First Round
1972–73	A PFG	18	First Round
1973–74	B PFG	4	DNQ
1974–75	B PFG	13	First Round
1975–76	B PFG	4	Quarter-final
1976–77	B PFG	5	First Round
1977–78	B PFG	6	Third Round
1978–79	B PFG	9	First Round
1979–80	B PFG	4	Second Round
1980–81	B PFG	2	First Round
1981–82	B PFG	2	First Round
1982–83	B PFG	1	Second Round
1983–84	A PFG	11	Second Round
1984–85	B PFG	3	Third Round
1985–86	V AFG	?	DNQ
1986–87	V AFG	1	DNQ
1987–88	B PFG	8	Third Round
1988–89	B PFG	8	Second Round
1989–90	B PFG	20	DNQ

Season	Division	Place	Bulgarian Cup
1990–91	V AFG	1	DNQ
1991–92	B PFG	13	DNQ
1992–93	B PFG	2	First Round
1993–94	A PFG	4	First Round
1994–95	A PFG	10	First Round
1995–96	A PFG	14	Second Round
1996–97	B PFG	11	Second Round
1997–98	B PFG	3	Second Round
1998–99	A PFG	14	Third Round
1999–00	A PFG	16	Quarter-final
2000–01	B PFG	18	First Round
2001–02	V AFG	2	First Round
2002–03	V AFG	2	DNQ
2003–04	B PFG	9	First Round
2004–05	B PFG	9	Second Round
2005–06	B PFG	7	Semi-final
2006–07	B PFG	7	Second Round
2007–08	B PFG	9	First Round
2008–09	B PFG	14	First Round
2009–10	B PFG	10	First Round

Season	Division	Place	Bulgarian Cup
2010–11	V AFG	4	DNQ
2011–12	V AFG	1	DNQ
2012–13	B PFG	12	First Round
2013–14	V AFG	14	First Round
2014–15	Did not exist		
2015–16	Did not exist		
2016–17	Did not exist		
2017–18	Did not exist		
2018–19	Third League	13	DNQ
2019–20	A RFG	2	DNQ
2020–21	A RFG	5	DNQ
2021–22	Third League	9	DNQ
2022–23	Third League	10	DNQ
2023–24	A RFG	7	DNQ
2024–25	Third League	3	DNQ
2025–26	Third League	4	DNQ
2026–27	Third League	TBD	First Round

- Total seasons in First League: 7
- Total seasons in Second League: 47
- Total seasons in Third League: 18
- Total seasons in A RFG: 3
