= 1973–74 Bulgarian Cup =

Tournament details
- Country: Bulgaria

Final positions
- Champions: CSKA Sofia (9th cup)
- Runners-up: Levski Sofia

The 1973–74 Bulgarian Cup was the 34th season of the Bulgarian Cup (in this period the tournament was named Cup of the Soviet Army). CSKA Sofia won the competition, beating Levski Sofia 2–1 after extra time in the final at the Vasil Levski National Stadium.

== First round ==
Team 1	Score	Team 2
Botev Plovdiv	0–1	Sliven
Lokomotiv Plovdiv	2–1	Haskovo
Slavia Sofia	1–0	Bdin Vidin
Hebar Pazardzhik	4–1	Pirin Blagoevgrad
Spartak Varna	1–0	Tryavna
Litex Lovech	0–2	Yantra Gabrovo
Montana	1–0	Spartak Pleven
Chernomorets Burgas	3–1	Rodopa Smolyan
Beroe Stara Zagora	5–0	Tundzha Yambol
Dunav Ruse	5–0	Beloslav
Etar Veliko Tarnovo	3–2	Dobrudzha Dobrich
Svoboda Milkovitsa	0–1	Botev Vratsa
Minyor Pernik	1–0	Marek Dupnitsa
Benkovski Isperih	1–4	Cherno More Varna
NSA Sofia	0–1 (aet)	Lokomotiv Sofia
Akademik Sofia	7–0	Strumska Slava Radomir

== Second round ==
Team 1	Agg.	Team 2	1st leg	2nd leg
Hebar Pazardzhik	3–3 (a)	Lokomotiv Plovdiv	1–1	2–2
Etar Veliko Tarnovo	3–1	Lokomotiv Sofia	3–1	0–0
Botev Vratsa	2–4	Spartak Varna	2–1	0–3
Yantra Gabrovo	2–6	Slavia Sofia	2–3	0–3
Akademik Sofia	8–3	Sliven	6–0	2–3
Dunav Ruse	3–1	Beroe Stara Zagora	2–1	1–0
Montana	3–11	Chernomorets Burgas	1–2	2–9
Cherno More Varna	5–5 (a)	Minyor Pernik	4–3	1–2

== Quarter-finals ==
Team 1	Agg.	Team 2	1st leg	2nd leg
Slavia Sofia	4–2	Chernomorets Burgas	4–1	0–1
Dunav Ruse	2–3	Minyor Pernik	2–1	0–2
Hebar Pazardzhik	2–2 (a)	Akademik Sofia	2–1	0–1
Etar Veliko Tarnovo	2–1	Spartak Varna	2–1	0–0

== Semi-finals ==
=== Semi-finals A ===
Team 1	Score	Team 2	Place
Akademik Sofia	1–0	Slavia Sofia	Sofia
Minyor Pernik	3–1 (a.e.t.)	Etar Veliko Tarnovo	Lovech

=== Semi-finals B ===
Team 1	Score	Team 2	Place
CSKA Sofia	1–0	Akademik Sofia	Sofia
Levski Sofia	2–1	Minyor Pernik	Kyustendil

== Final ==
=== Details ===
10 August 1974

CSKA Sofia	2−1 (a.e.t.)	Levski Sofia
Marashliev 9'; Kolev 101'		Tsvetkov 65'

Vasil Levski National Stadium, Sofia
Attendance: 40,000
Referee: Tsvetan Stanev (Sofia)

CSKA	Levski
