= 1999–2000 Bulgarian Cup =

Tournament details
- Country: Bulgaria

Final positions
- Champions: Levski Sofia (21st title)
- Runners-up: Neftochimic Burgas

The 1999–2000 Bulgarian Cup was the 60th season of the Bulgarian Cup. Levski Sofia won the competition, beating Neftochimic Burgas 2–0 in the final at the Stadion Hristo Botev in Plovdiv.

== First round ==
In this round entered winners from the preliminary rounds together with the teams from B Group.

Team 1	Score	Team 2
13 October 1999
Golemi vrah (III)	0–0 (a.e.t.) (6–5 p)	Beroe 2000 (II)
Botev Galabovo (III)	1–2	Vidima-Rakovski (II)
Pavlikeni (III)	0–0 (a.e.t.) (5–6 p)	Haskovo (II)
Planinets Apriltsi (III)	1–3	Spartak Pleven (II)
Slanchev Bryag Nesebar (III)	1–2 (a.e.t.)	Lokomotiv Plovdiv (II)
Fearplay Varna (III)	1–2	Septemvri Sofia (II)
Varshets (IV)	0–2	Dunav Ruse (II)
Iskar German (IV)	0–0 (a.e.t.) (4–2 p)	Antibiotik-Ludogorets Razgrad (II)
Kaliakra Kavarna (III)	1–1 (a.e.t.) (4–5 p)	Cherno More Varna (II)
Venets Oreshets (IV)	1–0	Metalurg Radomir (II)
Rodopa Smolyan (III)	0–0 (a.e.t.) (5–6 p)	Kremikovtsi (II)
Vihar Vetren (IV)	0–7	Botev Vratsa (II)
Benkovski Byala (III)	1–2	Iskar Sofia (II)
Spartak-S'94 Plovdiv (III)	3–1	Svetkavitsa (II)
Yunak Shumen (III)	1–1 (a.e.t.) (5–3 p)	Etar Veliko Tarnovo (II)
Marek Dupnitsa (III)	1–4	Maritsa Plovdiv (II)

== Second round ==
This round featured winners from the First Round and all teams from A Group.

Team 1	Score	Team 2
27 October 1999
Iskar Sofia (II)	2–4	Levski Sofia (I)
Venets Oreshets (IV)	0–4	CSKA Sofia (I)
Lovech (I)	3–1	Septemvri Sofia (II)
Belasitsa Petrich (I)	1–0	Lokomotiv Plovdiv (II)
Dobrudzha Dobrich (I)	10–0	Haskovo (II)
Velbazhd Kyustendil (I)	1–0	Dunav Ruse (II)
Slavia Sofia (I)	3–0	Kremikovtsi (II)
Maritsa Plovdiv (II)	1–2 (a.e.t.)	Chernomorets Burgas (I)
Botev Vratsa (II)	1–2	Minyor Pernik (I)
Spartak Pleven (II)	1–2	Olimpik-Beroe (I)
Golemi vrah (III)	1–6	Spartak Varna (I)
Vidima-Rakovski (II)	0–0 (a.e.t.) (3–4 p)	Lokomotiv Sofia (I)
Cherno More Varna (II)	2–0	Pirin Blagoevgrad (I)
Yunak Shumen (III)	1–4	Botev Plovdiv (I)
Iskar German (IV)	0–0 (a.e.t.) (7–8 p)	Shumen (I)
Spartak-S'94 Plovdiv (III)	0–2	Neftochimic Burgas (I)

== Third round ==
Team 1	Agg.	Team 2	1st leg	2nd leg
10–11 November / 8 December 1999
Levski Sofia (I)	3–3 (a)	Lovech (I)	2–0	1–3
Cherno More Varna (II)	1–4	Chernomorets Burgas (I)	0–2	1–2
Neftochimic Burgas (I)	7–1	Olimpik-Beroe (I)	3–0	4–1
Lokomotiv Sofia (I)	4–2	Belasitsa Petrich (I)	4–1	0–1
Velbazhd Kyustendil (I)	6–4	Spartak Varna (I)	3–0	3–4
Botev Plovdiv (I)	4–1	Minyor Pernik (I)	2–0	2–1
Dobrudzha Dobrich (I)	2–4	Shumen (I)	2–1	0–4
Slavia Sofia (I)	2–3	CSKA Sofia (I)	1–2	1–1

== Quarter-finals ==
Team 1	Agg.	Team 2	1st leg	2nd leg
22 March 2000 / 5 April 2000
CSKA Sofia (I)	1–4	Levski Sofia (I)	0–1	1–3
Lokomotiv Sofia (I)	3–3 (a)	Velbazhd Kyustendil (I)	3–1	0–2
Shumen (I)	5–7	Chernomorets Burgas (I)	5–1	0–6
Neftochimic Burgas (I)	4–1	Botev Plovdiv (I)	3–0	1–1

== Semi-finals ==
Team 1	Agg.	Team 2	1st leg	2nd leg
18 April 2000 / 1 May 2000
Levski Sofia (I)	6–2	Velbazhd Kyustendil (I)	6–1	0–1
Chernomorets Burgas (I)	3–5	Neftochimic Burgas (I)	2–2	1–3

== Final ==
=== Details ===
31 May 2000
18:00 EEST

Neftochimic Burgas	0–2	Levski Sofia
		G. Ivanov 87'; B. Ivanov 90+2'

Stadion Hristo Botev, Plovdiv
Attendance: 18,000
Referee: Anton Genov (Gabrovo)

Neftochimic	Levski
