= 1958–59 Bulgarian Cup =

Tournament details
- Country: Bulgaria

Final positions
- Champions: Levski Sofia (8th cup)
- Runners-up: Spartak Plovdiv

Tournament statistics
- Top goal scorer(s): D. Yordanov (Levski) (5 goals)

The 1958–59 Bulgarian Cup was the 19th season of the Bulgarian Cup (in this period the tournament was named Cup of the Soviet Army). Levski Sofia won the competition, beating Spartak Plovdiv 1–0 in the final at the Vasil Levski National Stadium in Sofia.

== First round ==
Team 1	Score	Team 2
Slavia Sofia	4–1	Cherno More Varna
Ludogorets Razgrad	2–1	Beroe Stara Zagora
Lokomotiv Sofia	7–1	Svetkavitsa
Spartak Pleven	6–0	Minyor Brezhani
Botev Vratsa	0–1	Levski Sofia
Lokomotiv Plovdiv	1–0	Arda Kardzhali
Etar Veliko Tarnovo	3–2	Dobrudzha Dobrich
CSKA Sofia	0–2	Botev Plovdiv
Minyor Pernik	0–0 (a.e.t.)	Spartak Plovdiv
Replay
Minyor Pernik	0–1	Spartak Plovdiv

== Second round ==
Team 1	Score	Team 2
Lokomotiv Sofia	1–0	Slavia Sofia
Levski Sofia	4–0	Lokomotiv Plovdiv
Botev Plovdiv	2–1 (a.e.t.)	Dunav Ruse
Litex Lovech	0–6	Spartak Pleven
Ludogorets Razgrad	2–3	Spartak Varna
Chernomorets Burgas	3–1	Etar Veliko Tarnovo
Marek Dupnitsa	2–3 (a.e.t.)	Sliven
Spartak Plovdiv	4–1	Akademik Sofia

== Quarter-finals ==
Team 1	Score	Team 2
Spartak Pleven	1–0	Botev Plovdiv
Sliven	0–2	Spartak Plovdiv
Spartak Varna	1–0	Chernomorets Burgas
Levski Sofia	3–2	Lokomotiv Sofia

== Semi-finals ==
Team 1	Score	Team 2
Levski Sofia	2–1	Spartak Varna
Spartak Plovdiv	2–2 (a.e.t.)	Spartak Pleven
Replay
Spartak Plovdiv	1–0	Spartak Pleven

== Final ==
=== Details ===
2 May 1959

Levski Sofia	1−0	Spartak Plovdiv
Peev 73'

Vasil Levski National Stadium, Sofia
Attendance: 40,000
Referee: Antonín Ružička (Czechoslovakia)

Levski	Spartak
