= 1993–94 Bulgarian Cup =

Tournament details
- Country: Bulgaria

Final positions
- Champions: Levski Sofia (19th cup)
- Runners-up: Pirin Blagoevgrad

Tournament statistics
- Top goal scorer(s): Daniel Borimirov (Levski) (6 goals)

The 1993–94 Bulgarian Cup was the 54th season of the Bulgarian Cup. Levski Sofia won the competition, beating Pirin Blagoevgrad 1–0 in the final at the Vasil Levski National Stadium in Sofia.

== First round ==
Team 1	Score	Team 2
24 November 1993
Metalurg Pernik (III)	5–2	Ticha Varna (III)
Pomorie (III)	0–1	Levski Karlovo (III)
Beroe Stara Zagora (I)	1–1 (a.e.t.) (3–1 p)	Lokomotiv Plovdiv (I)
Pavlikeni (III)	1–0	Shumen (I)
Chirpan (III)	1–0 (a.e.t.)	CSKA Sofia (I)
Lokomotiv GO (I)	1–1 (a.e.t.) (5–3 p)	Slavia Sofia (I)
Balkan Belogradchik (III)	2–3	Levski Sofia (I)
Pirin Blagoevgrad (I)	4–0	Spartak Varna (I)
Sliven (II)	2–1	Chernomorets Burgas (I)
Vihren Sandanski (II)	1–0	Botev Plovdiv (I)
Marek Dupnitsa (III)	2–1	Etar Veliko Tarnovo (I)
Provadia (II)	3–0 (w/o)	Lokomotiv Mezdra (II)
Cherno More Varna (I)	2–0	Dobrudzha Dobrich (I)
Spartak Plovdiv (II)	4–0	Lokomotiv Sofia (I)
Levski Omurtag (III)	0–1	Dorostol Silistra (II)

== Second round ==
Team 1	Agg.	Team 2	1st leg	2nd leg
1 / 8 December 1993
Beroe Stara Zagora (I)	0–5	Levski Sofia (I)	0–1	0–4
Pirin Blagoevgrad (I)	8–1	Levski Karlovo (III)	7–0	1–1
Pavlikeni (III)	0–5	Marek Dupnitsa (III)	0–2	0–3 (w/o)
Vihren Sandanski (II)	2–2 (a)	Lokomotiv GO (I)	2–2	0–0
Provadia (II)	3–3 (a)	Dorostol Silistra (II)	3–1	0–2
Sliven (II)	2–5	Cherno More Varna (I)	1–3	1–2
Metalurg Pernik (III)	1–5	Spartak Plovdiv (II)	1–2	0–3 (w/o)
Lokomotiv Dryanovo (III)	0–3	Chirpan (III)	0–0	0–3 (w/o)

== Quarter-finals ==
Team 1	Agg.	Team 2	1st leg	2nd leg
11 / 15 December 1993
Cherno More Varna (I)	2–8	Levski Sofia (I)	1–4	1–4
Chirpan (III)	1–2	Marek Dupnitsa (III)	1–0	0–2
Pirin Blagoevgrad (I)	4–2	Dorostol Silistra (II)	3–0	1–2
Lokomotiv GO (I)	0–6	Spartak Plovdiv (II)	0–2	0–4

== Semi-finals ==
Team 1	Agg.	Team 2	1st leg	2nd leg
3 / 23 March 1994
Levski Sofia (I)	10–0	Marek Dupnitsa (III)	7–0	3–0
3 / 30 March 1994
Pirin Blagoevgrad (I)	1–0	Spartak Plovdiv (II)	1–0	0–0

== Final ==
=== Details ===
4 May 1994

Pirin Blagoevgrad	0−1	Levski Sofia
		Iliev 87'

Vasil Levski National Stadium, Sofia
Attendance: 18,000
Referee: Lyuben Angelov

Pirin	Levski
