= 1959–60 A Group =

16th season of top-tier football league in Bulgaria

A Group
- Season: 1959–60
- Champions: CSKA Sofia (10th title)
- Relegated: Spartak Pleven
- European Cup: CSKA Sofia
- Matches: 132
- Goals: 338 (2.56 per match)
- Top goalscorer: Dimitar Yordanov; Lyuben Kostov; (12 goals each)

The 1959–60 A Group was the 12th season of the A Football Group, the top Bulgarian professional league for association football clubs, since its establishment in 1948.

== Overview ==
It was contested by 12 teams, and CSKA Sofia won the championship, giving them the title for the sixth time in a row.

== League standings ==
Pos	Team	Pld	W	D	L	GF	GA	GD	Pts	Qualification or relegation
1	CSKA Sofia (C)	22	12	8	2	42	18	+24	32	Qualification for European Cup preliminary round
2	Levski Sofia	22	11	6	5	32	22	+10	28	
3	Lokomotiv Sofia	22	7	9	6	31	22	+9	23	
4	Slavia Sofia	22	7	9	6	30	28	+2	23	
5	Septemvri Sofia	22	7	8	7	34	31	+3	22	
6	Minyor Pernik	22	8	6	8	27	25	+2	22	
7	Botev Plovdiv	22	8	5	9	30	31	−1	21	
8	Dunav Ruse	22	7	6	9	29	34	−5	20	
9	Spartak Plovdiv	22	4	12	6	21	28	−7	20	
10	Spartak Varna	22	6	8	8	27	38	−11	20	
11	Spartak Sofia	22	5	9	8	21	29	−8	19	
12	Spartak Pleven (R)	22	3	8	11	14	32	−18	14	Relegation to 1960–61 B Group

Source: rsssf.com
(C) Champions; (R) Relegated

== Results ==
Home \ Away	BPD	CSK	DUN	LEV	LSO	MIN	SEP	SLA	SPL	SPD	SSF	SPV
Botev Plovdiv		1–1	2–1	1–3	3–1	4–2	0–2	2–1	2–0	1–1	1–0	1–1
CSKA Sofia	0–0		5–1	3–2	1–1	3–1	2–0	3–1	2–0	1–1	1–1	7–1
Dunav Ruse	2–1	1–0		0–1	2–2	2–1	2–1	1–1	4–1	1–1	2–2	3–0
Levski Sofia	2–3	1–1	2–0		0–1	1–0	1–1	2–3	1–0	4–0	1–1	0–0
Lokomotiv Sofia	2–1	0–1	4–0	1–1		0–0	1–1	1–2	0–0	2–1	1–2	2–2
Minyor Pernik	3–1	1–0	2–0	2–0	1–0		1–1	0–1	1–1	2–2	0–1	2–0
Septemvri Sofia	1–0	1–2	2–1	1–2	1–3	2–1		1–4	1–1	4–1	1–1	2–2
Slavia Sofia	3–3	0–0	3–3	0–1	1–1	0–2	0–0		2–0	0–0	2–0	3–1
Spartak Pleven	1–0	1–1	1–0	0–1	0–1	2–3	2–8	0–0		0–2	0–0	3–1
Spartak Plovdiv	1–2	0–3	2–1	2–2	1–1	0–0	0–1	2–0	1–1		1–1	1–1
Spartak Sofia	2–1	1–2	0–1	1–2	0–5	1–1	2–0	2–2	0–0	0–1		2–0
Spartak Varna	1–0	2–3	1–1	0–2	1–0	3–2	2–2	3–1	1–0	0–0	4–1	

Source: A PFG (in Bulgarian)
Legend: Blue = home team win; Yellow = draw; Red = away team win.

== Top scorers ==
Rank	Scorer	Club	Goals
1	(Bulgaria) Dimitar Yordanov	Levski Sofia	12
1	(Bulgaria) Lyuben Kostov	Spartak Varna	12
3	(Bulgaria) Dimitar Yakimov	Septemvri Sofia	11
3	(Bulgaria) Tsvetan Milev	Septemvri Sofia	11
5	(Bulgaria) Vasil Razsolkov	Dunav Ruse	10
