= Dimitar Milanov =

Bulgarian football player and coach

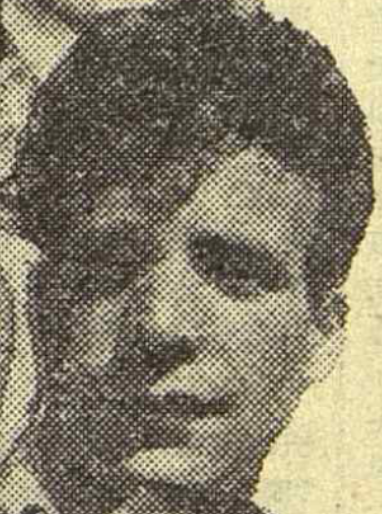
- Milanov in 1952

Personal information
- Full name: Dimitar Milanov Stoyanov
- Date of birth: 18 October 1928
- Place of birth: Sofia, Kingdom of Bulgaria
- Date of death: 1995 (aged 66–67)
- Place of death: Sofia, Bulgaria
- Position: Winger

Senior career*
Years	Team	Apps	(Gls)
1946–1947	Botev Sofia		
1947–1948	Septemvri Sofia		
1948–1960	CSKA Sofia		

International career
1948–1959	Bulgaria	39	(19)

Managerial career
- 1965–1966: Marek Dupnitsa
- 1971–1972: Hebar Pazardzhik
- * Club domestic league appearances and goals

Dimitar Milanov Stoyanov (Bulgarian: Димитър Миланов Стоянов; 18 October 1928 – 1995) was a Bulgarian football player and coach who played as a right winger.

== Club career ==
Born in Sofia, Milanov began his career at Botev Sofia, before moving to Septemvri Sofia. In 1948 he joined CSKA Sofia. With CSKA Milanov won 10 A Group titles and three Bulgarian Cups, and became two times top scorer of the league.

== International career ==
Milanov earned 39 caps for the Bulgaria national team, scoring 19 goals, between 1948 and 1959, and he competed at the 1952 Summer Olympics and 1956 Summer Olympics.

== Manager career ==
He coached Marek Dupnitsa and Hebar Pazardzhik.

== Honours ==
=== Club ===
CSKA Sofia

- A Group (10): 1948, 1951, 1952, 1954, 1955, 1956, 1957, 1958, 1958–59, 1959–60
- Bulgarian Cup (3): 1951, 1954, 1955

=== Individual ===
- A Group top scorer (2): 1948–49 (11 goals), 1951 (13 goals)
