= 1957 Bulgarian Cup =

Tournament details
- Country: Bulgaria

Final positions
- Champions: Levski Sofia (7th cup)
- Runners-up: Spartak Pleven

Tournament statistics
- Top goal scorer(s): D. Yordanov (Levski); I. Petrov (Spartak Pl); D. Borisov (Spartak Pl); P. Vladimirov (CSKA); H. Lazarov (Cherno More) (3 goals each)

The 1957 Bulgarian Cup was the 17th season of the Bulgarian Cup (in this period the tournament was named Cup of the Soviet Army). Levski Sofia won the competition, beating Spartak Pleven 2–1 in the final at the Vasil Levski National Stadium in Sofia.

== First round ==
| Team 1 | Score | Team 2 |
|---|---|---|
| Chernomorets Burgas | 0–1 | Zavod Stalin Pernik |
| Chavdar Byala Slatina | 1–3 | Slavia Sofia |
| Spartak Pleven | 1–0 | Spartak Sofia |
| Botev Plovdiv | 6–2 | Pavlikeni |
| Spartak Varna | 3–0 | Spartak Plovdiv |
| Minyor Pernik | 3–1 | Pirin Blagoevgrad |
| Tundzha Yambol | 0–2 | Cherno More Varna |
| Belasitsa Petrich | 1–0 | Rodni Krile Sofia |
| Dobrudzha Dobrich | 0–3 (w/o) | Lokomotiv Plovdiv |

== Second round ==
| Team 1 | Score | Team 2 |
|---|---|---|
| Spartak Varna | 2–1 (w/o) | Minyor Pernik |
| CSKA Sofia | 5–0 | Belasitsa Petrich |
| Levski Sofia | 2–1 | Dunav Ruse |
| Marek Dupnitsa | 3–5 (a.e.t.) | Lokomotiv Plovdiv |
| Zavod Stalin Pernik | 1–5 | Cherno More Varna |
| Spartak Pleven | 1–0 (a.e.t.) | Botev Plovdiv |
| Slavia Sofia | 3–1 | Lokomotiv Sofia |
| Shumen | 2–2 (a.e.t.) | Haskovo |
Replay
| Shumen | 3–0 | Haskovo |

== Quarter-finals ==
| Team 1 | Score | Team 2 |
|---|---|---|
| Shumen | 1–0 | Slavia Sofia |
| Cherno More Varna | 0–1 | CSKA Sofia |
| Lokomotiv Plovdiv | 0–1 | Levski Sofia |
| Spartak Varna | 0–1 | Spartak Pleven |

== Semi-finals ==
| Team 1 | Score | Team 2 |
|---|---|---|
| Levski Sofia | 2–0 (a.e.t.) | CSKA Sofia |
| Spartak Pleven | 6–1 | Shumen |

== Final ==
=== Details ===
7 November 1957

| Levski Sofia | 2−1 | Spartak Pleven |
|---|---|---|
| Kostov 15'; Yordanov 33' | | Borisov 21' |

Vasil Levski National Stadium, Sofia
Attendance: 28,000
Referee: Martin Macko (Czechoslovakia)

| Levski | Spartak |
