= 1948 Bulgarian Republic Football Championship =

4th season of season of top-tier football league in Bulgaria

Bulgarian Republic Football Championship
- Season: 1948
- Champions: Septemvri pri CDV Sofia

The 1948 Bulgarian Republic Football Championship was a national football competition in Bulgaria.

== Overview ==
It was contested by 16 teams, and Septemvri pri CDV Sofia won the championship.

== First round ==
Team 1	Agg.	Team 2	1st leg	2nd leg
Levski Sofia	2–0	Lyubislav Burgas	2–0	0–0
Aprilov Gabrovo	1–4	Septemvri pri CDV Sofia	0–2	1–2
Hristo Mihaylov Mihaylovgrad	6–13	Marek Dupnitsa	3–4	3–9
Benkovski Vidin	2–0	Lokomotiv Ruse	2–0	2–0
Spartak Sofia	3–0	Ilinden Petrich	2–0	1–0
TVP Varna	7–3	Loko Stara Zagora	1–1	6–2
Spartak Pleven	1–4	Slavia Plovdiv	1–1	0–3
Botev Plovdiv	2–4	Spartak Varna	2–3	0–1

== Quarter-finals ==
Team 1	Agg.	Team 2	1st leg	2nd leg
Benkovski Vidin	1–6	Septemvri pri CDV Sofia	0–4	1–2
Marek Dupnitsa	2–0	Spartak Sofia	2–0	0–0
Levski Sofia	7–3	Slavia Plovdiv	4–0	3–3
TVP Varna	2–6	Spartak Varna	2–2	0–4

== Semi-finals ==
Team 1	Agg.	Team 2	1st leg	2nd leg
Spartak Varna	2–6	Septemvri pri CDV Sofia	1–2	1–4
Levski Sofia	6–3	Marek Dupnitsa	3–1	3–2

== Final ==
=== First game ===
5 September 1948

Levski Sofia	2−1	Septemvri pri CDV Sofia
Pachedzhiev 76' (pen.), 79'	Report	Bogdanov 66'

Yunak Stadium, Sofia
Attendance: 30,000
Referee: Borislav Kamenski (Sofia)

=== Second game ===
9 September 1948

Septemvri pri CDV Sofia	3−1	Levski Sofia
Milanov 2', 69'; Chakmakov 90'	Report	Tsvetkov 17'

Yunak Stadium, Sofia
Attendance: 30,000
Referee: Stefan Danchev (Varna)

Septemvri pri CDV Sofia won 4–3 on aggregate.
