= 1966–67 Bulgarian Cup =

Tournament details
- Country: Bulgaria

Final positions
- Champions: Levski Sofia (9th cup)
- Runners-up: Spartak Sofia

The 1966–67 Bulgarian Cup was the 27th season of the Bulgarian Cup (in this period the tournament was named Cup of the Soviet Army). Levski Sofia won the competition, beating Spartak Sofia 3–0 in the final at the Vasil Levski National Stadium.

== First round ==
Team 1	Score	Team 2
Levski Lom	0–1	Spartak Sofia
Slavia Sofia	3–0	Velbazhd Kyustendil
Botev Vratsa	3–0	Orlin Pirdop
Dunav Ruse	2–1	Dorostol Silistra
Marek Dupnitsa	2–0	Minyor Vratsa
Botev Plovdiv	5–1	Sliven
Minyor Pernik	2–1	Haskovo
Chernomorets Burgas	4–1	Svetkavitsa
Lokomotiv Plovdiv	2–0	Arda Kardzhali
Dobrudzha Dobrich	6–0	Shumen
Spartak Plovdiv	3–2	Udarnik Plovdiv
Beroe Stara Zagora	5–1	Spartak Varna
Cherno More Varna	0–0 (3–2 p)	Spartak Pleven
CSKA Sofia	1–0	Litex Lovech
Levski Sofia	5–1	Tundzha Yambol
Lokomotiv Sofia	3–1	Lokomotiv GO

== Group stage ==
=== Group 1 ===
Matches were played in Dobrich and Varna

Team 1	Score	Team 2
Botev Plovdiv	1–1	Marek Dupnitsa
Lokomotiv Sofia	1–1	Chernomorets Burgas
Chernomorets Burgas	3–1	Marek Dupnitsa
Lokomotiv Sofia	3–1	Botev Plovdiv
Botev Plovdiv	1–1	Chernomorets Burgas
Lokomotiv Sofia	3–2	Marek Dupnitsa

Pos	Team	Pld	W	D	L	GF	GA	GD	Pts	Qualification
1	Lokomotiv Sofia	3	2	1	0	7	4	+3	5	Semi-finals
2	Chernomorets Burgas	3	1	2	0	5	3	+2	4	
3	Botev Plovdiv	3	0	2	1	3	5	−2	2	
4	Marek Dupnitsa	3	0	1	2	4	7	−3	1	

=== Group 2 ===
Matches were played in Pazardzhik and Plovdiv

Team 1	Score	Team 2
Slavia Sofia	4–1	Dunav Ruse
Beroe Stara Zagora	5–2	Botev Vratsa
Beroe Stara Zagora	1–0	Dunav Ruse
Slavia Sofia	1–1	Botev Vratsa
Beroe Stara Zagora	2–1	Slavia Sofia
Botev Vratsa	3–2	Dunav Ruse

Pos	Team	Pld	W	D	L	GF	GA	GD	Pts	Qualification
1	Beroe Stara Zagora	3	3	0	0	8	3	+5	6	Semi-finals
2	Slavia Sofia	3	1	1	1	6	4	+2	3	
3	Botev Vratsa	3	1	1	1	6	8	−2	3	
4	Dunav Ruse	3	0	0	3	3	8	−5	0	

=== Group 3 ===
Matches were played in Burgas and Sliven

Team 1	Score	Team 2
Levski Sofia	7–1	Minyor Pernik
Lokomotiv Plovdiv	1–0	Cherno More Varna
Levski Sofia	4–0	Cherno More Varna
Lokomotiv Plovdiv	2–1	Minyor Pernik
Levski Sofia	2–1	Lokomotiv Plovdiv
Cherno More Varna	3–2	Minyor Pernik

Pos	Team	Pld	W	D	L	GF	GA	GD	Pts	Qualification
1	Levski Sofia	3	3	0	0	13	2	+11	6	Semi-finals
2	Lokomotiv Plovdiv	3	2	0	1	4	3	+1	4	
3	Cherno More Varna	3	1	0	2	3	7	−4	2	
4	Minyor Pernik	3	0	0	3	4	12	−8	0	

=== Group 4 ===
Matches were played in Sofia and Blagoevgrad

Team 1	Score	Team 2
CSKA Sofia	3–2	Dobrudzha Dobrich
Spartak Sofia	2–0	Spartak Plovdiv
CSKA Sofia	1–1	Spartak Sofia
Spartak Plovdiv	2–0	Dobrudzha Dobrich
Spartak Sofia	6–0	Dobrudzha Dobrich
CSKA Sofia	3–1	Spartak Plovdiv

Pos	Team	Pld	W	D	L	GF	GA	GD	Pts	Qualification
1	Spartak Sofia	3	2	1	0	9	1	+8	5	Semi-finals
2	CSKA Sofia	3	2	1	0	7	4	+3	5	
3	Spartak Plovdiv	3	1	0	2	3	5	−2	2	
4	Dobrudzha Dobrich	3	0	0	3	2	11	−9	0	

== Semi-finals ==
Team 1	Score	Team 2
Levski Sofia	5–4	Lokomotiv Sofia
Spartak Sofia	1–1 (8–7 p)	Beroe Stara Zagora

== Final ==
=== Details ===
16 July 1967

Levski Sofia	3−0	Spartak Sofia
Asparuhov 32'; Iliev 69'; Nikolov 71'

Vasil Levski National Stadium, Sofia
Attendance: 30,000
Referee: Todor Bechirov (Plovdiv)

Levski	Spartak
