= 1956 A Group =

12th season of top-tier football league in Bulgaria

A Group
- Season: 1956
- Champions: CSKA Sofia (6th title)
- European Cup: CSKA Sofia
- Matches played: 132
- Goals scored: 330 (2.5 per match)
- Top goalscorer: Pavel Vladimirov (16 goals)

The 1956 A Group was the eighth season of the A Football Group, the top Bulgarian professional league for association football clubs, since its establishment in 1948.

== Overview ==
It was contested by 12 teams, and CSKA Sofia, who were the defending champions, won the championship.

== League standings ==
Pos	Team	Pld	W	D	L	GF	GA	GD	Pts	Qualification or relegation
1	CSKA Sofia (C)	22	11	9	2	46	25	+21	31	Qualification for European Cup preliminary round
2	Levski Sofia	22	8	10	4	30	24	+6	26	
3	Botev Plovdiv	22	9	7	6	27	20	+7	25	
4	Slavia Sofia	22	8	7	7	37	31	+6	23	
5	Minyor Pernik	22	8	6	8	40	34	+6	22	
6	Spartak Plovdiv	22	7	7	8	28	29	−1	21	
7	Lokomotiv Sofia	22	5	11	6	20	22	−2	21	
8	Spartak Pleven	22	6	9	7	19	26	−7	21	
9	Spartak Sofia	22	5	9	8	25	30	−5	19	
10	Spartak Varna	22	5	9	8	22	28	−6	19	
11	Zavod 12 Sofia (R)	22	5	9	8	20	29	−9	19	Relegation to 1957 B Group
12	Dunav Ruse (R)	22	2	13	7	16	32	−16	17	Relegation to 1957 B Group

Source: rsssf.com
(C) Champions; (R) Relegated

== Results ==
Home \ Away	BPD	CSK	DUN	LEV	LSO	MIN	SLA	SPL	SPD	SSF	SPV	ZAV
Botev Plovdiv		1–2	1–1	1–1	0–0	2–0	1–2	5–0	1–0	1–0	2–0	2–1
CSKA Sofia	2–2		4–1	3–1	0–0	1–0	3–2	2–0	4–1	3–1	2–1	6–0
Dunav Ruse	2–1	1–1		0–0	0–0	0–1	2–2	1–2	0–3	0–0	2–2	1–0
Levski Sofia	0–1	1–1	1–1		2–1	5–1	1–1	1–1	3–1	3–2	3–2	2–0
Lokomotiv Sofia	1–0	2–2	1–0	2–3		1–0	3–2	0–1	0–0	2–3	0–0	1–0
Minyor Pernik	1–1	3–6	5–0	4–1	1–1		4–1	3–2	1–1	1–1	2–3	3–0
Slavia Sofia	0–2	3–0	0–0	0–0	2–2	3–2		3–1	3–0	3–1	5–0	2–0
Spartak Pleven	2–0	0–0	1–1	0–1	1–1	0–0	1–1		1–0	3–0	1–0	1–1
Spartak Plovdiv	0–1	1–1	2–2	1–1	1–1	2–1	4–1	3–0		2–1	2–1	2–2
Spartak Sofia	1–1	1–1	4–0	0–0	1–0	2–4	1–0	1–1	1–0		1–1	0–0
Spartak Varna	1–1	2–1	1–1	1–0	0–0	0–0	2–0	2–0	1–2	1–1		0–0
Zavod 12 Sofia	3–0	1–1	0–0	0–0	3–1	1–3	1–1	0–0	2–0	3–2	2–1	

Source: A PFG (in Bulgarian)
Legend: Blue = home team win; Yellow = draw; Red = away team win.

== Champions ==
CSKA Sofia

Goalkeepers
(Bulgaria) Georgi Naydenov	13	(0)
(Bulgaria) Hristo Andonov	9	(0)

Defenders
(Bulgaria) Georgi Tsvetkov	11	(1)
(Bulgaria) Kiril Rakarov	18	(0)
(Bulgaria) Georgi Enisheynov	22	(0)
(Bulgaria) Manol Manolov	14	(0)

Midfielders
(Bulgaria) Gavril Stoyanov	18	(0)
(Bulgaria) Stefan Bozhkov	19	(7)
(Bulgaria) Petar Aleksiev	9	(0)

Forwards
(Bulgaria) Krum Yanev	17	(6)
(Bulgaria) Dimitar Milanov	18	(11)
(Bulgaria) Konstantin Sotirov	1	(1)
(Bulgaria) Georgi Dimitrov	17	(2)
(Bulgaria) Ivan Kolev	16	(5)
(Bulgaria) Stefan Stefanov	13	(3)
(Bulgaria) Petar Mihaylov	12	(4)
(Bulgaria) Panayot Panayotov	15	(6)

Manager
(Bulgaria) Krum Milev

== Top scorers ==
Rank	Scorer	Club	Goals
1	(Bulgaria) Pavel Vladimirov	Minyor Pernik	16
2	(Bulgaria) Dobromir Tashkov	Slavia Sofia	13
3	(Bulgaria) Dimitar Milanov	CSKA Sofia	11
4	(Bulgaria) Dimitar Andonov	Spartak Sofia	9
4	(Bulgaria) Mihail Kozhuharov	Slavia Sofia	9
