= Dimitar Yordanov (footballer) =

Bulgarian footballer

Personal information
- Date of birth: 1 November 1929
- Place of birth: Sofia, Bulgaria
- Date of death: 25 May 1996 (aged 66)
- Place of death: Sofia, Bulgaria
- Position: Striker

Senior career*
Years	Team	Apps	(Gls)
1945–1949	Slavia Sofia		
1950–1951	Botev Plovdiv		
1952	Cherno More	6	(0)
1953–1954	Zavod 12		
1954–1955	VVS Sofia		
1956–1965	Levski Sofia	165	(81)
1965–1967	Septemvri Sofia		

International career
1959–1960	Bulgaria	8	(3)
- * Club domestic league appearances and goals

Dimitar Yordanov (Bulgarian: Димитър Йорданов; 1 November 1929 – 25 May 1996), commonly known as Kukusha (Bulgarian: Кукуша), was a Bulgarian footballer who played as a forward. He was the top scorer of the 1960 championship (with 12 goals for Levski Sofia).

His grandson is Olympic artistic gymnast Krisztián Jordanov.

== Honours ==
Levski Sofia

- Bulgarian champion – 1965
- Bulgarian Cup – 1956, 1957, 1959
