= 1952 Bulgarian Cup =

Tournament details
- Country: Bulgaria

Final positions
- Champions: Slavia Sofia (1st cup)
- Runners-up: Spartak Sofia

Tournament statistics
- Top goal scorer(s): Tashkov (Spartak Sofia) (4 goals)

The 1952 Bulgarian Cup was the 12th season of the Bulgarian Cup (in this period the tournament was named Cup of the Soviet Army). Slavia Sofia won the competition, beating Spartak Sofia 3–1 in the final at the People's Army Stadium in Sofia.

== First round ==
Team 1	Score	Team 2
CSKA Sofia	5–0	VVS Sofia
Levski Sofia	3–1	Lokomotiv Sofia
Botev Plovdiv	2–0	Akademik Sofia
Pomorie	0–1	Lokomotiv Plovdiv
Belasitsa Petrich	0–1	Spartak Sofia
Minyor Pernik	0–2	Slavia Sofia
Spartak Varna	1–1 (a.e.t.)	Cherno More Varna
Dobrudzha Dobrich	1–1 (a.e.t.)	Spartak Pleven
Replay
Spartak Varna	2–2 (a.e.t.)	Cherno More Varna
Dobrudzha Dobrich	0–0 (a.e.t.)	Spartak Pleven
Second replay
Spartak Varna	0–1 (a.e.t.)	Cherno More Varna
Dobrudzha Dobrich	1–2	Spartak Pleven

== Quarter-finals ==
Team 1	Score	Team 2
Lokomotiv Plovdiv	1–0	CSKA Sofia
Cherno More Varna	0–1	Botev Plovdiv
Slavia Sofia	2–1	Levski Sofia
Spartak Sofia	1–1 (a.e.t.)	Spartak Pleven
Replay
Spartak Sofia	3–1	Spartak Pleven

== Semi-finals ==
Team 1	Score	Team 2
Botev Plovdiv	1–2	Slavia Sofia
Lokomotiv Plovdiv	0–0 (a.e.t.)	Spartak Sofia
Replay
Lokomotiv Plovdiv	1–1 (a.e.t.)	Spartak Sofia
Second replay
Lokomotiv Plovdiv	1–2	Spartak Sofia

== Final ==
=== Details ===
9 November 1952

Slavia Sofia	3−1	Spartak Sofia
Stoychev 32'; Isakov 46'; N. Ivanov 86' (pen.)		Dr. Georgiev 69'

People's Army Stadium, Sofia
Attendance: 22,000
Referee: Trayan Hristov (Sofia)

Slavia	Spartak
