= FC Gigant Belene =

Bulgarian football club

- Full name: FC Gigant Belene
- Nickname: The Giants
- Founded: 1947; 79 years ago
- Ground: Dunav, Belene
- Capacity: 5,000
- Chairman: Boris Blazhev
- Manager: Mihail Mihaylov
- League: North-West V AFG
- 2013–14: North-West V AFG, 15th /relegated/
Home colours

FC Giant Belene is a Bulgarian football club from the town of Belene.

== History ==
It was founded in 1947 Since then, the Gigant playing with variable success in B PFG. The first major success was the entry in B PFG in 1962, where he played until 1966, when it falls. The biggest success of Gigant in this period is rated at 8 spot in the 1965 year, teams have 11 wins, 11 draws and 12 losses, with goal difference 38:48. The next entry in the B PFG in 1976 year. Unfortunately the team was relegated the same year. Results were achieved: 19 spot, 10 wins, 4 losses equal to 24, with goal difference 46:84. After just one season in the lower group Gigant again returned to B group, but was relegated again after just one year. This is the last part "V" AFG until 1997, when a lack of money and sponsors, was relegated to regional groups. There are 1 years team oscillate in the weightless state, but next season with George Obretenov who is elected president, and after attracting some good players and after persuading several local boys teams that have a future, should return in dizzily "V" group. Decisive playoff in Gorna Oryahovitsa, where the Gigant hammered FC Varshets '99 with 2:1. Teams play their home games at the stadium Dunav, with a capacity of 5 000 spectators. The main team of the team is light blue. After 2006 since the team is aspiring to achieve top ranking in the "V" AFG group and the possible transition in the B PFG.
