= FC Yambol =

Bulgarian football club

FC Yambol 1915
- Full name: Football Club Yambol 1915
- Founded: March 17, 1915; 111 years ago as Tundzha Yambol; August 1, 2017; 9 years ago (refounded)
- Ground: Luskov Stadium, Yambol
- Capacity: 15,000
- Chairman: Galin Iliev
- Manager: Stoycho Stoev
- League: Bulgarian Third League
- 2024-25: Third League, 3rd
- Website: https://fcyambol1915.com/
Home colours	Away colours

FC Yambol 1915 (Bulgarian: ФК Ямбол 1915) is a Bulgarian football club based in Yambol, currently playing in the Third Amateur Football League (Bulgaria), the third division of Bulgarian football. Its home stadium "Tundzha" has a capacity of 18,000 seats. Club colors are blue and white.

Founded in 1915, Tundzha is one of the oldest Bulgarian football clubs. The team had early successes in the State Championship, finishing in third place twice during the 1930s. After the football league system was reformed after World War II, Tundzha was not selected to play in the newly formed A Group in 1950, instead starting from the second tier B Group. Tundzha did promote to the A Group in 1970, remaining three seasons in the top level, before dropping to the B Group and gradually falling down into the amateur levels over the next decades.

== History ==
=== Foundation ===
The club was officially founded on 17 March 1915. The team was one of the founders of Bulgarian B Group under the name Partizan. Tundzha Yambol is in 40th place on A Group All-time ranking from 1948 to 2013.

The team is the successor to several smaller clubs from Yambol, namely Botev, Georgi Drazhev, Nikolai Lyskov, Partizan, Spartak, DNA, Red Flag, Victory and Glory. During the 1950s the team attempted to become a stable part of B Group, oftentimes fluctuating close to promotion to the A Group as well as relegation to the third level.

=== Promotion to A Group and years among the best ===
In the 1960s, Tundzha became an established participant in the second tier, and they were often involved in the fight for the B Group title almost every season. Tundzha had their best season in 1969–70, when they managed to finish first in the second tier and promote to the A Group for the very first time in the club's history.

Tundzha's first season in the A Group, 1970-71, ended with the team finishing in 13th position on the table, thus avoiding relegation. That season, only one team was relegated, due to the league expanding from 16 to 18 teams. Only 16th-placed Maritsa Plovdiv were relegated, thus Tundzha survived their first season.

Tundzha's second season in the elite category, (1971-72), was marked by unstable results and the danger of relegation was present almost throughout the entire season. The team eventually finished 16th, with 28 points, two points above 17th-placed Marek Dupnitsa, who were relegated. Tundzha again managed to survive and remain part of A Group for next season.

Tundzha's third season in A Group proved to be the toughest for the club. Tundzha eventually finished 17th, with 25 points, which was three less than what was needed to survive, resulting in Tundzha's relegation from the top tier, after three seasons among the best.

=== The 80s, 90s and early 2000s ===
During the 1980s the team tried to remain part of Bulgarian B Group. One time the team fell into the Bulgarian V AFG, but again went back to the professionals.

In the 1990s, the team started its biggest falls in history. In 1994, the team fell from "B" Group to "V" Football Group. During the season 2000–01, the team fell into the "A" local group. In 2005–06, it lost the promotion for entering "V" Football Group, but in 2006–07 Tundzha entered back into the "V" Group.

=== Post Tundzha Years ===
In the 2011–12 season, FC Tundzha ended the season in second place, after the team lost the promotion in the last round in Southeastern "V" Group. The team played in 1/18 finals in The Bulgarian Cup in 2011–12.

=== 2017–present: Refounding as Yambol 1915 ===
On 2 August 2017 the Third League team Uragan Boyadzhik adapted Yambol 1915 name and moved to Yambol to succeed the dissolved in 2015 team. The new club is considered a separate entity from the historical club.

After the 2021–22 season, Tundzha was excluded from the Third League due to financial issues, but in the summer, the club was reinstated back to the Third League.

== Honours ==
- Bulgarian State Football Championship/A Group:
  - Third place (2): 1933, 1936
- B Group:
  - Winners (1): 1969–70
- Bulgarian Cup:
  - Semifinals (1): 1939
- Cup of Bulgarian Amateur Football League:
  - Winners (1): 2024–25

== Current squad ==
As of 1 August 2026

Note: Flags indicate national team as defined under FIFA eligibility rules; some limited exceptions apply. Players may hold more than one non-FIFA nationality.

No.	Pos.	Nation	Player
4	DF	BUL	Radoslav Dinev
6	MF	BUL	Aleksandar Banev
7	FW	BUL	Anzhel Petrov
8	MF	BUL	Ivan Toshev
9	FW	BUL	Hayri Saraliev
11	MF	BUL	Miroslav Hristov
14	MF	BUL	Velislav Markov
17	GK	BUL	Ventsislav Yankov
18	DF	BUL	Georgi Dinkov
19	MF	BUL	Georgi Dinev

No.	Pos.	Nation	Player
21	DF	BUL	Tsvetelin Radev
22	DF	BUL	Nikolay Yordzhev
23	MF	BUL	Miroslav Iliev
31	GK	BUL	Daniel Ambartsumyan
32	DF	BUL	Dobromir Dimitrov
33	DF	BUL	Nikolay Yankov
44	FW	BUL	Kristiyano Dimov
77	FW	BUL	Georgi Cholakov
97	MF	BUL	Stanislav Valchev
99	MF	BUL	Yanaki Panayotov

== Notable players ==
- (Bulgaria) Asparuh Valchanov (Parush)
- (Bulgaria) Vasil Metodiev
- (Bulgaria) Angel Chervenkov
- (Bulgaria) Georgi Mechedzhiev
- (Bulgaria) Vladko Shalamanov
- (Bulgaria) Stancho Gerdzhikov

== Past seasons ==
Season	League	Place	W	D	L	GF	GA	Pts	Bulgarian Cup
2017–18	Third League (III)	15	11	5	18	62	59	38	not qualified
Green marks a season followed by promotion, red a season followed by relegation.
