= List of Bulgarian Cup finals =

The Bulgarian Cup is a Bulgarian annual football competition. It is the country's main cup competition.

== Results ==
Key

(R)	Replay
(SR)	Second Replay
Italics	Team from outside the top level of Bulgarian football
**Bold**	Winning team were also Bulgarian football champions, achieving The Double

=== Tsar's Cup (1938-1942) ===
Season	Winner	Score	Runner-up	Date	Venue	Attendance	Notes
1938	FK 13 Sofia (1)	walkover	Levski Ruse	03/10/1938	Yunak Stadium	10,000	
1939	Shipka Sofia (1)	2–0	Levski Ruse	03/10/1939	Levski Playing Field	4,000	
1940	FK 13 Sofia (2)	2–1	Sportklub Plovdiv	13/10/1940	Levski Playing Field	5,000	
1941	AS 23 Sofia (1)	4–2	Napredak Ruse	03/10/1941	City Stadium	10,000	
1942	Levski Sofia (1)	walkover	Sportklub Plovdiv	03/10/1942	Yunak Stadium	8,000	

=== Soviet Army Cup (1946-1982) ===
Season	Winner	Score	Runner-up	Date	Venue	Attendance	Notes
1946	**Levski Sofia** (2)	4–1	Chernolomets Popovo	06/05/1946	Yunak Stadium	15,000	
1947	**Levski Sofia** (3)	1–0	Botev Plovdiv	01/06/1947	Yunak Stadium	17,000	
1948	Lokomotiv Sofia (1)	1–0	Slavia-Chengelov Plovdiv	09/05/1948	Yunak Stadium	12,000	
1949	**Levski Sofia** (4)	1–1 (aet)	CSKA Sofia	08/05/1949	Yunak Stadium	35,000	
(R)	**Levski Sofia** (4)	2–2 (aet)	CSKA Sofia	16/05/1949	Yunak Stadium	35,000	
(SR)	**Levski Sofia** (4)	2–1 (aet)	CSKA Sofia	17/05/1949	Yunak Stadium	35,000	
1950	**Levski Sofia** (5)	1–1 (aet)	CSKA Sofia	26/11/1950	Narodna Armia Stadium	30,000	
(R)	**Levski Sofia** (5)	1–1 (aet)	CSKA Sofia	27/11/1950	Narodna Armia Stadium	30,000	
(SR)	**Levski Sofia** (5)	1–0 (aet)	CSKA Sofia	03/12/1950	Narodna Armia Stadium	30,000	
1951	**CSKA Sofia** (1)	1–0 (aet)	Akademik Sofia	07/11/1951	Narodna Armia Stadium	25,000	
1952	Slavia Sofia (1)	3–1	Spartak Sofia	09/11/1952	Narodna Armia Stadium	22,000	
1953	Lokomotiv Sofia (2)	2–1	Levski Sofia	25/11/1953	Vasil Levski National Stadium	30,000	
1954	**CSKA Sofia** (2)	2–1	Slavia Sofia	07/11/1954	Vasil Levski National Stadium	30,000	
1955	**CSKA Sofia** (3)	5–2 (aet)	Spartak Plovdiv	11/12/1955	Vasil Levski National Stadium	32,000	
1956	Levski Sofia (6)	5–2	Botev Plovdiv	18/11/1956	Vasil Levski National Stadium	40,000	
1957	Levski Sofia (7)	2–1	Spartak Pleven	07/11/1957	Vasil Levski National Stadium	28,000	
1958	Spartak Plovdiv (1)	1–0	Minyor Pernik	07/11/1958	Vasil Levski National Stadium	20,000	
1958–59	Levski Sofia (8)	1–0	Spartak Plovdiv	02/05/1959	Vasil Levski National Stadium	40,000	
1959–60	Septemvri Sofia (1)	4–3 (aet)	Lokomotiv Plovdiv	15/06/1960	Vasil Levski National Stadium	25,000	
1960–61	**CSKA Sofia** (4)	3–0	Spartak Varna	28/06/1961	Vasil Levski National Stadium	25,000	
1961–62	Botev Plovdiv (1)	3–0	Dunav Ruse	12/08/1962	Vasil Levski National Stadium	20,000	
1962–63	Slavia Sofia (2)	2–0	Botev Plovdiv	10/09/1963	Vasil Levski National Stadium	40,000	
1963–64	Slavia Sofia (3)	3–2	Botev Plovdiv	09/09/1964	Vasil Levski National Stadium	31,000	
1964–65	CSKA Sofia (5)	3–2	Levski Sofia	08/09/1965	Ovcha Kupel Stadium	30,000	
1965–66	Slavia Sofia (4)	1–0	CSKA Sofia	10/09/1966	Vasil Levski National Stadium	25,000	
1966–67	Levski Sofia (9)	3–0	Spartak Sofia	16/07/1967	Vasil Levski National Stadium	38,000	
1967–68	Spartak Sofia (1)	3–2 (aet)	Beroe Stara Zagora	06/06/1968	Vasil Levski National Stadium	18,000	
1968–69	**CSKA Sofia** (6)	2–1	Levski Sofia	30/04/1969	Vasil Levski National Stadium	40,000	
1969–70	**Levski Sofia** (10)	2–1	CSKA Sofia	25/08/1970	Vasil Levski National Stadium	46,000	
1970–71	Levski Sofia (11)	3–0	Lokomotiv Plovdiv	25/08/1971	Narodna Armia Stadium	30,000	
1971–72	**CSKA Sofia** (7)	3–0	Slavia Sofia	25/08/1972	Vasil Levski National Stadium	25,000	
1972–73	**CSKA Sofia** (8)	2–1	Beroe Stara Zagora	03/06/1973	Vasil Levski National Stadium	18,000	
1973–74	CSKA Sofia (9)	2–1 (aet)	Levski Sofia	10/08/1974	Vasil Levski National Stadium	40,000	
1974–75	Slavia Sofia (5)	3–2	Lokomotiv Sofia	21/06/1975	Vasil Levski National Stadium	15,000	
1975–76	Levski Sofia (12)	4–3 (aet)	CSKA Sofia	02/061976	Vasil Levski National Stadium	65,000	
1976–77	**Levski Sofia** (13)	2–1	Lokomotiv Sofia	12/06/1977	Vasil Levski National Stadium	45,000	
1977–78	Marek Dupnitsa (1)	1–0	CSKA Sofia	24/05/1978	Vasil Levski National Stadium	40,000	
1978–79	**Levski Sofia** (14)	4–1	Beroe Stara Zagora	23/05/1979	Vasil Levski National Stadium	40,000	
1979–80	Slavia Sofia (6)	3–1	Beroe Stara Zagora	13/05/1980	Vasil Levski National Stadium	30,000	
1980–81	Botev Plovdiv (2)	1–0	Pirin Blagoevgrad	05/05/1981	Vasil Levski National Stadium	20,000	
1981–82	Lokomotiv Sofia (3)	2–1 (aet)	Lokomotiv Plovdiv	12/06/1982	Pleven Stadium	8,000	

=== Bulgarian Cup (since 1983) ===
Season	Winner	Score	Runner-up	Date	Venue	Attendance	Notes
1982–83	**CSKA Sofia** (10)	4–0	Spartak Varna	03/04/1983	Plovdiv Stadium	15,000	
1983–84	**Levski Sofia** (15)	1–0	Botev Plovdiv	02/05/1984	Druzhba Stadium, Kardzhali	30,000	
1984–85	CSKA Sofia (11)	2–1	Levski Sofia	19/06/1985	Vasil Levski National Stadium	35,000	
1985–86	Levski Sofia (16)	2–1	CSKA Sofia	27/04/1986	Vasil Levski National Stadium	28,000	
1986–87	**CSKA Sofia** (12)	2–1	Levski Sofia	13/05/1987	Vasil Levski National Stadium	40,000	
1987–88	CSKA Sofia (13)	4–1	Levski Sofia	11/05/1988	Vasil Levski National Stadium	50,000	
1988–89	**CSKA Sofia** (14)	3–0	Chernomorets Burgas	24/05/1989	Pleven Stadium	15,000	
1989–90	Sliven (1)	2–0	CSKA Sofia	30/05/1990	Hristo Botev Stadium, Gabrovo	15,000	
1990–91	Levski Sofia (17)	2–1	Botev Plovdiv	29/05/1991	Ivaylo Stadium	10,000	
1991–92	Levski Sofia (18)	5–0	Pirin Blagoevgrad	27/05/1992	Georgi Benkovski Stadium	10,000	
1992–93	CSKA Sofia (15)	1–0	Botev Plovdiv	02/06/1993	Hristo Botev Stadium, Blagoevgrad	18,000	
1993–94	**Levski Sofia** (19)	1–0	Pirin Blagoevgrad	04/05/1994	Vasil Levski National Stadium	18,000	
1994–95	Lokomotiv Sofia (4)	4–2	Botev Plovdiv	27/05/1995	Vasil Levski National Stadium	20,000	
1995–96	**Slavia Sofia** (7)	walkover	Levski Sofia	01/05/1996	Vasil Levski National Stadium	22,000	
1996–97	**CSKA Sofia** (16)	3–1	Levski Sofia	27/05/1997	Vasil Levski National Stadium	18,500	
1997–98	Levski Sofia (20)	5–0	CSKA Sofia	13/05/1998	Vasil Levski National Stadium	50,000	
1998–99	CSKA Sofia (17)	1–0	Litex Lovech	25/05/1999	Balgarska Armia Stadium	20,000	
1999–00	**Levski Sofia** (21)	2–0	Neftochimic Burgas	31/05/2000	Hristo Botev Stadium, Plovdiv	18,000	
2000–01	Litex Lovech (1)	1–0 (aet)	Velbazhd Kyustendil	24/05/2001	Lokomotiv Stadium, Sofia	8,000	
2001–02	**Levski Sofia** (22)	3–1	CSKA Sofia	15/05/2002	Ovcha Kupel Stadium	17,500	
2002–03	Levski Sofia (23)	2–1	Litex Lovech	21/05/2003	Vasil Levski National Stadium	10,453	
2003–04	Litex Lovech (2)	2–2 (4–3 pen.)	CSKA Sofia	12/05/2004	Vasil Levski National Stadium	11,461	
2004–05	Levski Sofia (24)	2–1	CSKA Sofia	25/05/2005	Vasil Levski National Stadium	10,848	
2005–06	CSKA Sofia (18)	3–1	Cherno More Varna	24/05/2006	Vasil Levski National Stadium	7,216	
2006–07	**Levski Sofia** (25)	1–0 (aet)	Litex Lovech	24/05/2007	Beroe Stadium	11,000	
2007–08	Litex Lovech (3)	1–0	Cherno More Varna	14/05/2008	Vasil Levski National Stadium	2,040	
2008–09	Litex Lovech (4)	3–0	Pirin Blagoevgrad	26/05/2009	Georgi Asparuhov Stadium	9,500	
2009–10	Beroe Stara Zagora (1)	1–0	Pomorie	05/05/2010	Lovech Stadium	5,250	
2010–11	CSKA Sofia (19)	1–0	Slavia Sofia	25/05/2011	Vasil Levski National Stadium	17,500	
2011–12	**Ludogorets Razgrad** (1)	2–1	Lokomotiv Plovdiv	19/05/2012	Lazur Stadium	13,103	
2012–13	Beroe Stara Zagora (2)	3–3 (3–1 pen.)	Levski Sofia	15/05/2013	Lovech Stadium	7,500	
2013–14	**Ludogorets Razgrad** (2)	1–0	Botev Plovdiv	15/05/2014	Lazur Stadium	13,250	
2014–15	Cherno More Varna (1)	2–1 (aet)	Levski Sofia	30/05/2015	Lazur Stadium	13,910	
2015–16	CSKA Sofia (20)	1−0	Montana	24/05/2016	Vasil Levski National Stadium	33,345	
2016–17	Botev Plovdiv (3)	2−1	Ludogorets Razgrad	24/05/2017	Vasil Levski National Stadium	9,800	
2017–18	Slavia Sofia (8)	0−0 (4–2 pen.)	Levski Sofia	09/05/2018	Vasil Levski National Stadium	32,000	
2018–19	Lokomotiv Plovdiv (1)	1−0	Botev Plovdiv	15/05/2019	Vasil Levski National Stadium	20,500	
2019–20	Lokomotiv Plovdiv (2)	0−0 (5–3 pen.)	CSKA Sofia	01/07/2020	Vasil Levski National Stadium	12,000	
2020–21	CSKA Sofia (21)	1−0	Arda	19/05/2021	Vasil Levski National Stadium	22,000	
2021–22	Levski Sofia (26)	1–0	CSKA Sofia	15/05/2022	Vasil Levski National Stadium	40,600	
2022–23	**Ludogorets Razgrad** (3)	3–1	CSKA 1948 Sofia	24/05/2023	Vasil Levski National Stadium	2,000	
2023–24	Botev Plovdiv (4)	3−2	Ludogorets Razgrad	15/05/2024	Vasil Levski National Stadium	11,334	
2024–25	**Ludogorets Razgrad** (4)	1–0	CSKA Sofia	22/05/2025	Vasil Levski National Stadium	37,455	
2025–26	CSKA Sofia (22)	1−1 (4–3 pen.)	Lokomotiv Plovdiv	20/05/2026	Vasil Levski National Stadium	32,000	

== Performance ==
=== By Club ===
Club	Wins	Last win	Runners-up	Last final lost
Levski Sofia	26	2022	12	2018
CSKA Sofia	22	2026	15	2025
Slavia Sofia	8	2018	3	2011
Lovech	4	2009	3	2007
Lokomotiv Sofia	4	1995	2	1977
Ludogorets Razgrad	4	2025	2	2024
Botev Plovdiv	4	2024	10	2019
Beroe Stara Zagora	2	2013	4	1980
Lokomotiv Plovdiv	2	2020	5	2026
FK 13 Sofia	2	1940	—	—
Spartak Plovdiv	1	1958	2	1959
Spartak Sofia	1	1968	2	1967
Cherno More Varna	1	2015	2	2008
Shipka Sofia	1	1939	—	—
Atletik-Slava 23	1	1941	—	—
Septemvri Sofia	1	1960	—	—
Marek Dupnitsa	1	1978	—	—
Sliven	1	1990	—	—
Pirin Blagoevgrad	—	—	4	2009
Levski Ruse	—	—	2	1939
Sportklub Plovdiv	—	—	2	1942
Spartak Varna	—	—	2	1983
Napredak Ruse	—	—	1	1941
Chernolomets Popovo	—	—	1	1946
Slavia-Chengelov Plovdiv	—	—	1	1948
Akademik Sofia	—	—	1	1951
Spartak Pleven	—	—	1	1957
Minyor Pernik	—	—	1	1958
Dunav Ruse	—	—	1	1962
Chernomorets Burgas	—	—	1	1989
Naftex Burgas	—	—	1	2000
Velbazhd Kyustendil	—	—	1	2001
Montana	—	—	1	2016
Arda Kardzhali	—	—	1	2021
CSKA 1948 Sofia	—	—	1	2023

=== By City / Town ===
A total of 18 clubs have won the Bulgarian Cup, from eight cities.

City	Wins	Clubs
Sofia	66	Levski (26), CSKA (22), Slavia (8), Lokomotiv (4), FK 13 (2), AS-23 (1), Septemvri (1), Shipka (1), Spartak (1)
Plovdiv	7	Botev (4), Lokomotiv (2), Spartak (1)
Razgrad	4	Ludogorets (4)
Lovech	4	Lovech (4)
Stara Zagora	2	Beroe (2)
Dupnitsa	1	Marek (1)
Sliven	1	Sliven (1)
Varna	1	Cherno More (1)

Note: Italics indicates defunct clubs.
