= 1963 Bulgarian Cup final =

- Event: 1962–63 Bulgarian Cup
Slavia Sofia	Botev Plovdiv
2	0
- Date: 10 September 1963
- Venue: Vasil Levski National Stadium, Sofia
- Referee: Atanas Stavrev (Varna)
- Attendance: 40,000

The 1963 Bulgarian Cup final was the 23rd final of the Bulgarian Cup (in this period the tournament was named Cup of the Soviet Army) that took place on 10 September 1963 at Vasil Levski National Stadium in Sofia. It was contested between Slavia Sofia and Botev Plovdiv, with two goals from Mihail Mishev giving Slavia a 2–0 win to claim their 2nd Bulgarian Cup title.

== Route to the Final ==
Slavia		Round	Botev
Opponent	Result		Opponent	Result
Sliven	4–2 home	Round of 32	Asenovets	2–0 away
Beroe Stara Zagora	1–1 home; 2–0 away	Round of 16	Lokomotiv Ruse	9–0 home; 1–0 away
Marek Dupnitsa	2–3 away; 4–2 home	Quarter-finals	Cherno More Varna	2–0 home; 1–1 away
Levski Sofia	3–1 home; 0–0 away	Semi-finals	Spartak Sofia	1–1 home; 3–1 away

== Match ==
=== Details ===
10 September 1963

Slavia Sofia	2−0	Botev Plovdiv
Mishev 11', 62'

Vasil Levski National Stadium, Sofia
Attendance: 40,000
Referee: Atanas Stavrev (Varna)

Slavia	Botev

GK	1	(Bulgaria) Yordan Zhezhov
DF	2	(Bulgaria) Aleksandar Shalamanov
MF	3	(Bulgaria) Petar Velichkov
DF	4	(Bulgaria) Petar Panagonov
DF	5	(Bulgaria) Ivan Davidov
MF	6	(Bulgaria) Petar Petrov
FW	7	(Bulgaria) Mihail Mishev
MF	8	(Bulgaria) Emanuil Manolov
FW	9	(Bulgaria) Anton Krastev
FW	10	(Bulgaria) Aleksandar Vasilev (c)
MF	11	(Bulgaria) Georgi Gugalov
Substitutes:
Manager:
(Bulgaria) Anastas Kovachev

GK	1	(Bulgaria) Georgi Naydenov	(substituted off) 67'
DF	2	(Bulgaria) Rayno Panayotov
DF	3	(Bulgaria) Georgi Chakarov (c)
DF	4	(Bulgaria) Vidin Apostolov
DF	5	(Bulgaria) Ivan Zaduma
MF	6	(Bulgaria) Rayko Stoynov
MF	7	(Bulgaria) Dinko Dermendzhiev	(substituted off) 46'
MF	8	(Bulgaria) Bozhidar Atanasov
FW	9	(Bulgaria) Georgi Asparuhov
FW	10	(Bulgaria) Georgi Haralampiev
FW	11	(Bulgaria) Georgi Popov
Substitutes:
GK	--	(Bulgaria) Mihail Karushkov	(substituted on) 67'
MF	--	(Bulgaria) Dobrin Belchev	(substituted on) 46'
Manager:
(Bulgaria) Georgi Genov

== See also ==
- 1962–63 A Group
