= 1964 Bulgarian Cup final =

- Event: 1963–64 Bulgarian Cup
Slavia Sofia	Botev Plovdiv
3	2
- Date: 9 September 1964
- Venue: Vasil Levski National Stadium, Sofia
- Referee: Stefan Konstantinov (Varna)
- Attendance: 31,000

The 1964 Bulgarian Cup final was the 24th final of the Bulgarian Cup (in this period the tournament was named Cup of the Soviet Army), and was contested between Slavia Sofia and Botev Plovdiv on 9 September 1964 at Vasil Levski National Stadium in Sofia. Slavia won the final 3–2.

== Match ==
=== Details ===
9 September 1964

Slavia Sofia	3−2	Botev Plovdiv
Vasilev 25' (pen.); Krastev 52', 73'		Kostadinov 11'; N. Ivanov 42'

Vasil Levski National Stadium, Sofia
Attendance: 31,000
Referee: Stefan Konstantinov (Varna)

Slavia	Botev

GK	1	(Bulgaria) Stefan Pashoolov
DF	2	(Bulgaria) Aleksandar Shalamanov
DF	3	(Bulgaria) Dimitar Kostov
DF	4	(Bulgaria) Petar Panagonov
DF	5	(Bulgaria) Dimitar Largov (c)
MF	6	(Bulgaria) Petar Petrov	(substituted off) 73'
MF	7	(Bulgaria) Mihail Mishev
MF	8	(Bulgaria) Petar Velichkov
FW	9	(Bulgaria) Anton Krastev
FW	10	(Bulgaria) Aleksandar Vasilev
MF	11	(Bulgaria) Georgi Gugalov
Substitutes:
FW	--	(Bulgaria) Georgi Haralampiev	(substituted on) 73'
Manager:
(Bulgaria) Dobromir Tashkov

GK	1	(Bulgaria) Mihail Karushkov	(substituted off) 79'
DF	2	(Bulgaria) Ivan Zaduma
DF	3	(Bulgaria) Georgi Chakarov (c)
DF	4	(Bulgaria) Vidin Apostolov
DF	5	(Bulgaria) Blagoy Yanev
MF	6	(Bulgaria) Rayko Stoynov
MF	7	(Bulgaria) Dinko Dermendzhiev
MF	8	(Bulgaria) Nikola Ivanov
FW	9	(Bulgaria) Georgi Popov
MF	10	(Bulgaria) Bozhidar Atanasov
FW	11	(Bulgaria) Dimitar Kostadinov
Substitutes:
GK	--	(Bulgaria) Georgi Naydenov	(substituted on) 79'
Manager:
(Bulgaria) Georgi Genov

== See also ==
- 1963–64 A Group
