= 1966 Bulgarian Cup final =

- Event: 1965–66 Bulgarian Cup
| Slavia Sofia | CSKA Sofia |
| 1 | 0 |
- Date: 10 September 1966
- Venue: Vasil Levski National Stadium, Sofia
- Referee: Kostadin Dinov (Sofia)
- Attendance: 25,000

The 1966 Bulgarian Cup final was the 26th final of the Bulgarian Cup (in this period the tournament was named Cup of the Soviet Army), and was contested between Slavia Sofia and CSKA Sofia on 10 September 1966 at Vasil Levski National Stadium in Sofia. Slavia won the final 1–0.

== Route to the Final ==
| Slavia | | Round | CSKA |
|---|---|---|---|---|
| Opponent | Result | | Opponent | Result |
| Montana | 4–0 home | Round of 32 | Velbazhd Kyustendil | 6–0 home |
| Dobrudzha Dobrich | 1–0 home | Round of 16 | Minyor Vratsa | 2–0 home |
| Spartak Plovdiv | 6–1 home | Quarter-finals | Beroe Stara Zagora | 3–1 away |
| Spartak Sofia | 2–1 home | Semi-finals | Lokomotiv Sofia | 1–0 home |

== Match ==
=== Details ===
10 September 1966

| Slavia Sofia | 1−0 | CSKA Sofia |
|---|---|---|
| Vasilev 3' |

Vasil Levski National Stadium, Sofia
Attendance: 25,000
Referee: Kostadin Dinov (Sofia)

| Slavia | CSKA |

| GK | 1 | (Bulgaria) Simeon Simeonov |
| DF | 2 | (Bulgaria) Aleksandar Shalamanov |
| DF | 3 | (Bulgaria) Dimitar Kostov |
| DF | 4 | (Bulgaria) Stoyan Aleksiev |
| MF | 5 | (Bulgaria) Petar Petrov |
| DF | 6 | (Bulgaria) Ivan Davidov |
| MF | 7 | (Bulgaria) Lyuben Tasev | (substituted off) 75' |
| FW | 8 | (Bulgaria) Georgi Haralampiev |
| FW | 9 | (Bulgaria) Stoyan Vrazhev |
| MF | 10 | (Bulgaria) Emanuil Manolov |
| FW | 11 | (Bulgaria) Aleksandar Vasilev (c) |
Substitutes:
| FW | -- | (Bulgaria) Mihail Mishev | (substituted in) 75' |
Manager:
(Bulgaria) Dobromir Tashkov

| GK | 1 | (Bulgaria) Yordan Filipov |
| DF | 2 | (Bulgaria) Ivan Vasilev |
| DF | 3 | (Bulgaria) Boris Gaganelov (c) |
| DF | 4 | (Bulgaria) Hristo Marinchev |
| MF | 5 | (Bulgaria) Boris Stankov |
| DF | 6 | (Bulgaria) Dimitar Penev |
| MF | 7 | (Bulgaria) Ivan Zafirov | (substituted off) 76' |
| MF | 8 | (Bulgaria) Tsvetan Atanasov |
| MF | 9 | (Bulgaria) Asparuh Nikodimov |
| FW | 10 | (Bulgaria) Dimitar Yakimov |
| FW | 11 | (Bulgaria) Ivan Kolev |
Substitutes:
| FW | -- | (Bulgaria) Vasil Romanov | (substituted in) 76' |
Manager:
(Bulgaria) Stoyan Ormandzhiev

== See also ==
- 1965–66 A Group
