= 1960 Bulgarian Cup final =

- Event: 1959–60 Bulgarian Cup
| Septemvri Sofia | Lokomotiv Plovdiv |
| 4 | 3 |
- After extra time
- Date: 15 June 1960
- Venue: Vasil Levski National Stadium, Sofia
- Referee: Georgi Hristov (Sofia)
- Attendance: 25,000

The 1960 Bulgarian Cup final was the 20th final of the Bulgarian Cup (in this period the tournament was named Cup of the Soviet Army), and was contested between Septemvri Sofia and Lokomotiv Plovdiv on 15 June 1960 at Vasil Levski National Stadium in Sofia. Septemvri won the final 4–3 after extra time.

== Route to the Final ==
| Septemvri | | Round | Lokomotiv |
|---|---|---|---|---|
| Opponent | Result | | Opponent | Result |
| Botev Vratsa | 3–2 away | Round of 32 | Dunav Ruse | 7–2 home |
| Ludogorets Razgrad | 6–2 away | Round of 16 | Velbazhd Kyustendil | 2–2 away (a.e.t.) |
| Arda Kardzhali | 3–1 home | Quarter-finals | Tundzha Yambol | 2–1 home |
| Etar Veliko Tarnovo | 3–1 away | Semi-finals | Spartak Plovdiv | 1–1 home (a.e.t.) |

== Match ==
=== Details ===
15 June 1960

| Septemvri Sofia | 4−3 (a.e.t.) | Lokomotiv Plovdiv |
|---|---|---|
| Dzhordzhilov 5', 48'; Yosifov 43'; Milev 120' | | Grancharov 28'; Genov 62'; Kanchev 65' |

Vasil Levski National Stadium, Sofia
Attendance: 25,000
Referee: Georgi Hristov (Sofia)

| Septemvri | Lokomotiv |

| GK | 1 | (Bulgaria) Dimitar Slavov |
| DF | 2 | (Bulgaria) Nayden Bonev |
| DF | 3 | (Bulgaria) Panayot Panayotov (red card) 31' |
| DF | 4 | (Bulgaria) Boris Apostolov |
| MF | 5 | (Bulgaria) Mihail Panayotov |
| MF | 6 | (Bulgaria) Sotir Yosifov |
| MF | 8 | (Bulgaria) Dimitar Yakimov |
| MF | 10 | (Bulgaria) Hristo Dzhordzhilov |
| FW | 7 | (Bulgaria) Tsvetan Milev |
| FW | 9 | (Bulgaria) Petar Argirov (c) | (substituted off) 91' |
| FW | 11 | (Bulgaria) Aleksandar Vasilev |
Substitutes:
| FW | -- | (Bulgaria) Kostadin Blagoev | (substituted in) 91' |
Manager:
(Bulgaria) Trendafil Stankov

| GK | 1 | (Bulgaria) Marin Marinov | | (substituted off) 46' |
| DF | 2 | (Bulgaria) Georgi Hristov |
| DF | 3 | (Bulgaria) David Popov (c) |
| DF | 4 | (Bulgaria) Dimitar Krastev |
| DF | 5 | (Bulgaria) Ivan Boyadzhiev |
| MF | 6 | (Bulgaria) Aleksandar Bahchevandzhiev |
| MF | 8 | (Bulgaria) Atanas Tasev |
| MF | 10 | (Bulgaria) Stoyan Genov |
| FW | 7 | (Bulgaria) Rangel Rangelov | | (substituted off) 16' |
| FW | 9 | (Bulgaria) Ivan Kanchev |
| FW | 11 | (Bulgaria) Georgi Lazarov |
Substitutes:
| GK | -- | (Bulgaria) Luchko Lukov | | (substituted in) 46' |
| FW | -- | (Bulgaria) Dimitar Grancharov | (red card) 31' | (substituted in) 16' |
Manager:
(Bulgaria) Hristo Bachvarov

== See also ==
- 1959–60 A Group
