= 1953 Bulgarian Cup final =

- Event: 1953 Bulgarian Cup
Lokomotiv Sofia	Levski Sofia
2	1
- Date: 25 November 1953
- Venue: Vasil Levski National Stadium, Sofia
- Referee: Todor Stoyanov (Sofia)
- Attendance: 30,000

The 1953 Bulgarian Cup final was the 13th final of the Bulgarian Cup (in this period the tournament was named Cup of the Soviet Army), and was contested between Lokomotiv Sofia and Levski Sofia on 25 November 1953 at Vasil Levski National Stadium in Sofia. Lokomotiv won the final 2–1, claiming their second national cup title.

== Match ==
=== Details ===
25 November 1953
12:10 EEST

Lokomotiv Sofia	2−1	Levski Sofia
Blagoev 3'; Argirov 67'		Takev 34'

Vasil Levski National Stadium, Sofia
Attendance: 30,000
Referee: Todor Stoyanov (Sofia)

Lokomotiv	Levski

GK	1	(Bulgaria) Marin Marinov
DF	2	(Bulgaria) Gotse Vasilev
DF	3	(Bulgaria) Asen Panayotov
DF	4	(Bulgaria) Ivan Atanasov
MF	5	(Bulgaria) Todor Finkov
MF	6	(Bulgaria) Lazar Hristov (c)
FW	7	(Bulgaria) Georgi Berkov
FW	8	(Bulgaria) Kostadin Blagoev
FW	9	(Bulgaria) Petar Argirov
FW	10	(Bulgaria) Yanko Yankov
FW	11	(Bulgaria) Nikola Bogdanov	Substituted off
Substitutes:
FW	--	(Bulgaria) Boris Petrunov	Substituted in
Manager:
(Bulgaria) Anastas Kovachev

GK	1	(Bulgaria) Simeon Kostov
DF	2	(Bulgaria) Metodi Angelovski
DF	3	(Bulgaria) Ivan Dimchev (c)
DF	4	(Bulgaria) Dimitar Dimitrov
MF	5	(Bulgaria) Aleksandar Bahchevandzhiev
MF	6	(Bulgaria) Aleksandar Krastev
FW	7	(Bulgaria) Stefan Abadzhiev
MF	8	(Bulgaria) Ivan Georgiev
FW	9	(Bulgaria) Dimitar Popdimitrov
FW	10	(Bulgaria) Dimitar Andonov
FW	11	(Bulgaria) Todor Takev
Manager:
(Bulgaria) Dimitar Mutafchiev

== See also ==
- 1953 A Group
