= 1953 Bulgarian Cup =

Tournament details
- Country: Bulgaria

Final positions
- Champions: Lokomotiv Sofia (2nd cup)
- Runners-up: Levski Sofia

Tournament statistics
- Top goal scorer(s): P. Argirov (Loko Sf) (4 goals)

The 1953 Bulgarian Cup was the 13th season of the Bulgarian Cup (in this period the tournament was named Cup of the Soviet Army). Lokomotiv Sofia won the competition, beating Levski Sofia 2–1 in the final at the Vasil Levski National Stadium in Sofia.

== First round ==
Team 1	Score	Team 2
Slivnishki Geroy	2–0	Hebar Pazardzhik
Lokomotiv Plovdiv	2–1 (a.e.t.)	Sliven
Akademik Sofia	3–1	Minyor Pernik
Etar Veliko Tarnovo	2–1	Chernolomets Popovo
Pirin Blagoevgrad	0–1	VVS Sofia
Botev Vratsa	0–2	Udarnik Pleven
Dorostol Silistra	0–3	Spartak Varna
Cherno More Varna	2–1	Akademik Varna
Stroitel Burgas	1–0	Botev Plovdiv
Spartak Pleven	2–2 (a.e.t.)	Stroitel Sofia
Arda Kardzhali	0–0 (a.e.t.)	Spartak Plovdiv
Replay
Spartak Pleven	0–0 (a.e.t.)	Stroitel Sofia
Arda Kardzhali	0–5	Spartak Plovdiv
Second replay
Spartak Pleven	2–4	Stroitel Sofia

== Second round ==
Team 1	Score	Team 2
Lokomotiv Sofia	2–1 (a.e.t.)	Spartak Sofia
Akademik Sofia	3–0	Udarnik Pleven
Lokomotiv Plovdiv	0–1	Levski Sofia
Spartak Plovdiv	1–0	Spartak Varna
Stroitel Sofia	3–0	Stroitel Burgas
Slivnishki Geroy	0–1	VVS Sofia
CSKA Sofia	1–0	Slavia Sofia
Cherno More Varna	1–1 (a.e.t.)	Etar Veliko Tarnovo
Replay
Cherno More Varna	3–0	Etar Veliko Tarnovo

== Quarter-finals ==
Team 1	Score	Team 2
Spartak Plovdiv	1–0	Cherno More Varna
CSKA Sofia	3–0	Akademik Sofia
Levski Sofia	1–1 (a.e.t.)	Stroitel Sofia
Lokomotiv Sofia	0–0 (a.e.t.)	VVS Sofia
Replay
Levski Sofia	4–1	Stroitel Sofia
Lokomotiv Sofia	4–1	VVS Sofia

== Semi-finals ==
Team 1	Score	Team 2
Levski Sofia	4–1	Spartak Plovdiv
CSKA Sofia	0–1	Lokomotiv Sofia

== Final ==
=== Details ===
25 November 1953
12:10 EEST

Lokomotiv Sofia	2−1	Levski Sofia
Blagoev 3'; Argirov 67'		Takev 34'

Vasil Levski National Stadium, Sofia
Attendance: 30,000
Referee: Todor Stoyanov (Sofia)

Lokomotiv	Levski
