= 1948 Bulgarian Cup final =

- Event: 1948 Bulgarian Cup
Lokomotiv Sofia	Slavia-Chengelov
1	0
- Date: 9 May 1948
- Venue: Yunak Stadium, Sofia
- Referee: Stefan Danchev (Varna)
- Attendance: 12,000

The 1948 Bulgarian Cup final was the 8th final of the Bulgarian Cup (in this period the tournament was named Cup of the Soviet Army), and was contested between Lokomotiv Sofia and Slavia-Chengelov on 9 May 1948 at Yunak Stadium in Sofia. Lokomotiv won the final 1–0.

== Match ==
=== Details ===
9 May 1948

Lokomotiv Sofia	1−0	Slavia-Chengelov Plovdiv
Stefanov 33'

Yunak Stadium, Sofia
Attendance: 12,000
Referee: Stefan Danchev (Varna)

Lokomotiv	Slavia-Chengelov

GK	1	(Bulgaria) Simeon Kostov
DF	2	(Bulgaria) Stoyan Ormandzhiev
DF	3	(Bulgaria) Stoyo Nedyalkov (c)
DF	4	(Bulgaria) Stiliyan Angelov
MF	5	(Bulgaria) Traycho Petkov
MF	6	(Bulgaria) Lazar Hristov
FW	7	(Bulgaria) Asen Milushev
FW	8	(Bulgaria) Kostadin Blagoev
FW	9	(Bulgaria) Stefan Stefanov
FW	10	(Bulgaria) Krum Milev
FW	11	(Bulgaria) Petar Argirov
Manager:
(Bulgaria) Krum Milev

GK	1	(Bulgaria) Nikola Arov
DF	2	(Bulgaria) Metodi Karayanev
DF	3	(Bulgaria) Boris Belkov
DF	4	(Bulgaria) Petar Sabev
MF	5	(Bulgaria) Todor Finkov
MF	6	(Bulgaria) Asparuh Karayanev (c)
FW	7	(Bulgaria) Kiril Minkov
FW	8	(Bulgaria) Hristo Bachvarov
FW	9	(Bulgaria) Stefan Paunov
FW	10	(Bulgaria) Ivan Lazarov
FW	11	(Bulgaria) Marin Dimitrov
Manager:

== See also ==
- 1948 Bulgarian Republic Football Championship
