= 1960–61 PFC Cherno More Varna season =

Cherno More Varna
1960-61 season
- Manager: Lozan Kotsev
- Republican Football Group A: 12th

The 1960-61 season marked the immediate return of Cherno More to the top flight of Bulgarian football after the club finished bottom of A Group in 1958-1959.

== Overview ==
Despite spending the majority of the season mid-table, Cherno More narrowly avoided relegation on the last day of the season. The team was seven points clear of Spartak Sofia with only five matches left in the two-points-for-a-win league. Spartak's resurgence began with an away victory against their namesakes and Cherno More's city rivals. On the penultimate day of the season Cherno More lost against city rivals Spartak Varna at home, while Spartak Sofia thrashed Dunav Ruse 5-0 to move just a point behind the Sailors with both teams scheduled to play in Sofia in the last round. Spartak Sofia recorded another convincing win by defeating runners-up Levski Sofia 4-1 but eventually went down despite having a +4 goal difference, after Cherno More, without a win away the whole season, prevailed against Septemvri Sofia 2-1.

== Republican Football Group A ==
=== Matches ===
18 September 1960 Round 1	Minyor Dimitrovo	1–0	Cherno More Varna	Pernik

25 September 1960 Round 2	Cherno More Varna	2–0	Dunav Ruse	Varna

29 September 1960 Round 3	Spartak Sofia	0–0	Cherno More Varna	Sofia

2 October 1960 Round 4	Cherno More Varna	1–0	Lokomotiv Sofia	Varna

9 October 1960 Round 5	Spartak Plovdiv	1–0	Cherno More Varna	Plovdiv

16 October 1960 Round 6	Cherno More Varna	2–1	Slavia Sofia	Varna

19 October 1960 Round 7	Levski Sofia	4–0	Cherno More Varna	Sofia

23 October 1960 Round 8	Marek Stanke Dimitrov	2–2	Cherno More Varna	Dupnitsa

30 October 1960 Round 9	Cherno More Varna	1–1	Beroe Stara Zagora	Varna

7 November 1960 Round 10	CDNA Sofia	5–0	Cherno More Varna	Sofia

13 November 1960 Round 11	Cherno More Varna	0–0	Botev Plovdiv	Varna

18 December 1960 Round 12	Spartak Varna	2–0	Cherno More Varna	Varna

25 December 1960 Round 13	Cherno More Varna	5–1	Septemvri Sofia	Varna

12 March 1961 Round 14	Cherno More Varna	0–1	Minyor Dimitrovo	Varna

19 March 1961 Round 15	Dunav Ruse	1–1	Cherno More Varna	Ruse

26 March 1961 Round 16	Cherno More Varna	2–1	Spartak Sofia	Varna

9 April 1961 Round 17	Lokomotiv Sofia	1–0	Cherno More Varna	Sofia

16 April 1961 Round 18	Cherno More Varna	4–0	Spartak Plovdiv	Varna

21 April 1961 Round 19	Slavia Sofia	3–1	Cherno More Varna	Sofia

29 April 1961 Round 20	Cherno More Varna	1–1	Levski Sofia	Varna

14 May 1961 Round 21	Cherno More Varna	4–1	Marek Stanke Dimitrov	Varna

21 May 1961 Round 22	Beroe Stara Zagora	1–1	Cherno More Varna	Stara Zagora

27 May 1961 Round 23	Cherno More Varna	1–2	CDNA Sofia	Varna

4 June 1961 Round 24	Botev Plovdiv	4–2	Cherno More Varna	Plovdiv

25 June 1961 Round 25	Cherno More Varna	1–2	Spartak Varna	Varna

2 July 1961 Round 26	Septemvri Sofia	1–2	Cherno More Varna	Sofia

=== League standings ===
Pos	Team	Pld	W	D	L	GF	GA	GD	Pts	Qualification or relegation
10	Beroe Stara Zagora	26	7	10	9	30	38	−8	24	
11	Slavia Sofia	26	8	7	11	33	37	−4	23	
12	Cherno More Varna	26	8	7	11	33	37	−4	23	
13	Spartak Sofia (R)	26	8	6	12	39	35	+4	22	Relegation to 1961–62 B Group
14	Septemvri Sofia (R)	26	5	7	14	33	56	−23	17	Relegation to 1961–62 B Group

Source: rsssf.com
(R) Relegated

=== Results summary ===
Overall								Home						Away					
Pld	W	D	L	GF	GA	GD	Pts	W	D	L	GF	GA	GD	W	D	L	GF	GA	GD
26	8	7	11	33	37	−4	31	7	3	3	24	11	+13	1	4	8	9	26	−17

== Soviet Army Cup ==
Round of 32	Cherno More Varna	2–1	FC Gigant Belene

Round of 16	Cherno More Varna	1–2	Levski Sofia
