= 1955 Bulgarian Cup final =

- Event: 1955 Bulgarian Cup
CSKA Sofia	Spartak Plovdiv
5	2
- After extra time
- Date: 11 December 1955
- Venue: Vasil Levski National Stadium, Sofia
- Referee: Yordan Takov (Sofia)
- Attendance: 32,000

The 1955 Bulgarian Cup final was the 15th final of the Bulgarian Cup (in this period the tournament was named Cup of the Soviet Army), and was contested between CSKA Sofia and Spartak Plovdiv on 11 December 1955 at Vasil Levski National Stadium in Sofia. CSKA won the final 5–2 after extra time.

== Route to the Final ==
CSKA		Round	Spartak
Opponent	Result		Opponent	Result
none	---	Round of 32	Etar Veliko Tarnovo	3–1 away
Haskovo	6–1 away	Round of 16	Spartak Sofia	3–1 home
Lokomotiv Plovdiv	4–1 away	Quarter-finals	Dinamo Plovdiv	1–1 home; 2–2; 1–0
Botev Plovdiv	4–2 home	Semi-finals	Slavia Sofia	1–0 home

== Match ==
=== Details ===
11 December 1955

CSKA Sofia	5−2 (a.e.t.)	Spartak Plovdiv
Milanov 7', 29', 108'; Panayotov 97', 113'		Dushev 40'; Deshev 60'

Vasil Levski National Stadium, Sofia
Attendance: 32,000
Referee: Yordan Takov (Sofia)

CSKA	Spartak

GK	1	(Bulgaria) Georgi Naydenov
DF	2	(Bulgaria) Kiril Rakarov
DF	3	(Bulgaria) Manol Manolov
DF	4	(Bulgaria) Georgi Enisheynov
MF	5	(Bulgaria) Stefan Bozhkov (c)
MF	6	(Bulgaria) Gavril Stoyanov
FW	7	(Bulgaria) Dimitar Milanov
FW	8	(Bulgaria) Georgi Dimitrov
FW	9	(Bulgaria) Panayot Panayotov
FW	10	(Bulgaria) Ivan Kolev
FW	11	(Bulgaria) Krum Yanev
Manager:
(Bulgaria) Krum Milev

GK	1	(Bulgaria) Nikola Damyanov
DF	2	(Bulgaria) Ivan Ivanov
DF	3	(Bulgaria) Atanas Manolov
DF	4	(Bulgaria) Ivan Manolov
MF	5	(Bulgaria) Bozhidar Mitkov
MF	6	(Bulgaria) Dimitar Krastev
FW	7	(Bulgaria) Todor Diev (c)
FW	8	(Bulgaria) Georgi Furnadzhiev
FW	9	(Bulgaria) Mihail Dushev
FW	10	(Bulgaria) Dimitar Deshev
FW	11	(Bulgaria) Ivan Barbov
Manager:
(Bulgaria) Trendafil Stankov

== See also ==
- 1955 A Group
