= 1965–66 Bulgarian Cup =

Tournament details
- Country: Bulgaria

Final positions
- Champions: Slavia Sofia (4th cup)
- Runners-up: CSKA Sofia

The 1965–66 Bulgarian Cup was the 26th season of the Bulgarian Cup (in this period the tournament was named Cup of the Soviet Army). Slavia Sofia won the competition, beating CSKA Sofia 1–0 in the final at the Vasil Levski National Stadium.

== First round ==
| Team 1 | Score | Team 2 |
25 December 1965
| Spartak Sofia | 1–0 | Pirin Blagoevgrad |
| Lokomotiv Sofia | 3–0 | Balkan Botevgrad |
26 December 1965
| Levski Sofia | 3–1 | Benkovski Isperih |
| Botev Vratsa | 3–1 | Rozova Dolina |
| Botev Plovdiv | 5–4 | Maritsa Plovdiv |
| Dobrudzha Dobrich | 3–2 | Cherno More Varna |
| Lokomotiv Plovdiv | 1–0 | Gorubso Madan |
| Spartak Plovdiv | 1–1 (4–3 p) | Arda Kardzhali |
| Minyor Vratsa | 3–2 | Spartak Pleven |
| Beroe Stara Zagora | 2–0 | Lokomotiv Burgas |
| Marek Dupnitsa | 2–1 | Minyor Pernik |
| Etar Veliko Tarnovo | 2–1 | Spartak Varna |
| CSKA Sofia | 6–0 | Velbazhd Kyustendil |
| Chernomorets Burgas | 3–2 | Sliven |
| Slavia Sofia | 4–0 | Montana |
| Dorostol Silistra | 1–1 (6–6 p)^{1} | Dunav Ruse |

- ^{1}Dorostol qualified by drawing lots.

== Second round ==
| Team 1 | Score | Team 2 |
26 June 1966
| Levski Sofia | 0–0 (4–3 p) | Etar Veliko Tarnovo |
| Spartak Sofia | 5–0 | Dorostol Silistra |
| Slavia Sofia | 1–0 | Dobrudzha Dobrich |
| Spartak Plovdiv | 1–1 (4–3 p) | Botev Vratsa |
| Beroe Stara Zagora | 5–1 | Marek Dupnitsa |
| CSKA Sofia | 2–0 | Minyor Vratsa |
| Lokomotiv Sofia | 4–2 | Chernomorets Burgas |
| Lokomotiv Plovdiv | 3–3 (4–3 p) | Botev Plovdiv |

== Quarter-finals ==
| Team 1 | Score | Team 2 |
13 August 1966
| Slavia Sofia | 6–1 | Spartak Plovdiv |
14 August 1966
| Lokomotiv Sofia | 3–2 | Levski Sofia |
| Spartak Sofia | 3–3 (7–5 p) | Lokomotiv Plovdiv |
17 August 1966
| CSKA Sofia | 3–1 | Beroe Stara Zagora |

== Semi-finals ==
| Team 1 | Score | Team 2 |
25 August 1966
| Slavia Sofia | 2–1 | Spartak Sofia |
| CSKA Sofia | 1–0 | Lokomotiv Sofia |

== Final ==
=== Details ===
10 September 1966

| Slavia Sofia | 1−0 | CSKA Sofia |
|---|---|---|
| Vasilev 3' |

Vasil Levski National Stadium, Sofia
Attendance: 25,000
Referee: Kostadin Dinov (Sofia)

| Slavia | CSKA |
