= 1959 Bulgarian Cup final =

- Event: 1958–59 Bulgarian Cup
Levski Sofia	Spartak Plovdiv
1	0
- Date: 2 May 1959
- Venue: Vasil Levski National Stadium, Sofia
- Referee: Antonín Ružička (Czechoslovakia)
- Attendance: 40,000

The 1959 Bulgarian Cup final was the 19th final of the Bulgarian Cup (in this period the tournament was named Cup of the Soviet Army), and was contested between Levski Sofia and Spartak Plovdiv on 2 May 1959 at Vasil Levski National Stadium in Sofia. Levski won the final 1–0.

== Route to the Final ==
Levski		Round	Spartak Plovdiv
Opponent	Result		Opponent	Result
Botev Vratsa	1–0 away	Round of 32	Minyor Pernik	1–0 away
Lokomotiv Plovdiv	4–0 home	Round of 16	Akademik Sofia	4–1 home
Lokomotiv Sofia	3–2 home	Quarter-finals	Sliven	2–0 away
Spartak Varna	2–1 home	Semi-finals	Spartak Pleven	1–0 home

== Match ==
=== Details ===
2 May 1959

Levski Sofia	1−0	Spartak Plovdiv
Peev 73'

Vasil Levski National Stadium, Sofia
Attendance: 40,000
Referee: Antonín Ružička (Czechoslovakia)

Levski	Spartak

GK	1	(Bulgaria) Ivan Derventski
DF	2	(Bulgaria) Pavel Vasilev
DF	3	(Bulgaria) Blagoy Filipov
DF	4	(Bulgaria) Boris Apostolov
MF	5	(Bulgaria) Yoncho Arsov (c)
MF	6	(Bulgaria) Ivan Georgiev
MF	8	(Bulgaria) Stefan Abadzhiev
MF	10	(Bulgaria) Hristo Iliev
FW	7	(Bulgaria) Georgi Sokolov
FW	9	(Bulgaria) Dimitar Yordanov
FW	11	(Bulgaria) Aleksandar Kostov	(substituted off) 46'
Substitutes:
FW	--	(Bulgaria) Peyo Peev	(substituted on) 46'
Manager:
(Bulgaria) Georgi Pachedzhiev

GK	1	(Bulgaria) Vasil Stoynov
DF	2	(Bulgaria) Ivan Ivanov (c)
DF	3	(Bulgaria) Ivan Manolov
DF	4	(Bulgaria) Atanas Manolov	(substituted off) 46'
MF	5	(Bulgaria) Dimitar Dimov
MF	6	(Bulgaria) Georgi Statev
MF	8	(Bulgaria) Bozhidar Mitkov
MF	10	(Bulgaria) Dimitar Vasilev
FW	7	(Bulgaria) Tsonyo Stoynov
FW	9	(Bulgaria) Mihail Dushev
FW	11	(Bulgaria) Nayden Naydenov
Substitutes:
DF	--	(Bulgaria) Georgi Botev
Manager:
(Bulgaria) Panayot Tanev

== See also ==
- 1958–59 A Group
