= Kiril Rakarov =

Bulgarian footballer (1932–2006)

Personal information
- Full name: Kiril Manolov Rakarov
- Date of birth: 24 May 1932
- Place of birth: Pavlikeni, Bulgaria
- Date of death: 25 August 2006 (aged 74)
- Place of death: Sofia, Bulgaria
- Position: Defender

Senior career*
Years	Team	Apps	(Gls)
1949–1951	Cherveno Zname Pavlikeni		
1952–1964	CSKA Sofia	190	(17)

International career
1953–1962	Bulgaria	58	(1)

Managerial career
- 1974–1975: CSKA Sofia (assistant)
- 1976: Cherno More
- * Club domestic league appearances and goals

Olympic medal record

Men's Football

Representing Bulgaria
Bronze medal – third place	1956 Melbourne	Team competition

Kiril Manolov Rakarov (Bulgarian: Кирил Манолов Ракаров, 24 May 1932 – 25 August 2006) was a Bulgarian football player who played as a defender. He represented Bulgaria at the 1956 Summer Olympics and the 1962 FIFA World Cup. For 13 seasons he made 190 league appearances and scored 17 league goals for CSKA Sofia.

== Honours ==
=== Club ===
CSKA Sofia

- Bulgarian League (10): 1952, 1954, 1955, 1956, 1957, 1958, 1958–59, 1959–60, 1960–61, 1961–62
- Bulgarian Cup (3): 1953–54, 1954–55, 1960–61

=== International ===
Bulgaria

- Olympic Bronze Medal: 1956
