= Aleksandar Kostov =

Bulgarian footballer and coach (1938–2019)

Personal information
- Full name: Aleksandar Dimitrov Kostov
- Date of birth: 2 March 1938
- Place of birth: Sofia, Bulgaria
- Date of death: 15 April 2019 (aged 81)
- Place of death: Sofia, Bulgaria
- Position: Forward

Youth career
- 1953–1956: Levski Sofia

Senior career*
Years	Team	Apps	(Gls)
1956–1959	Levski Sofia	32	(8)
1959–1961	Botev Plovdiv	29	(11)
1961–1971	Levski Sofia	234	(54)
Total		295	(73)

International career
1957–1966	Bulgaria	8	(1)

Managerial career
- 1971–1973: Levski Sofia (youth team)
- 1973–1974: Levski Sofia (assistant)
- 1974–1976: Levski Sofia (youth team)
- 1976–1980: Levski Sofia (assistant)
- 1980–1982: Haskovo
- 1982–1984: Alki Larnaca
- 1984–1987: Ethnikos Achna
- 1987–1988: AS Marsa
- 1989–1991: AS Marsa
- 1994–1995: Montana
- 1995–1996: Persebaya Surabaya
- 1996–1997: Barito Putera
- * Club domestic league appearances and goals

Aleksandar Dimitrov Kostov (Bulgarian: Александър Дми́тров Костов; 2 March 1938 – 15 April 2019) also known as Sasho, was a Bulgarian footballer and later coach.

He represented Bulgaria at the FIFA World Cups in 1962 and 1966.

== Honours ==
=== Player ===
Levski Sofia

- Bulgarian League (3): 1964–65, 1967–68, 1969–70
- Bulgarian Cup (6): 1956, 1957, 1959, 1967, 1970, 1971

=== Manager ===
AS Marsa

- Tunisian Cup: 1989–90
