= 1955 Bulgarian Cup =

Tournament details
- Country: Bulgaria

Final positions
- Champions: CSKA Sofia (3rd cup)
- Runners-up: Spartak Plovdiv

Tournament statistics
- Top goal scorer(s): T. Diev (Spartak Pd); K. Blagoev (Loko Sf) (6 goals each)

The 1955 Bulgarian Cup was the 15th season of the Bulgarian Cup (in this period the tournament was named Cup of the Soviet Army). The tournament started on 16 October 1955 and ended on 11 December with the final. CSKA Sofia won the competition, beating Spartak Plovdiv 5–2 after extra time in the final at the Vasil Levski National Stadium in Sofia.

== First round ==
Team 1	Score	Team 2
Spartak Pleven	2–0	Dobrudzha Dobrich
Cherno More Varna	2–1	Spartak Varna
Tundzha Yambol	1–0	Pavlikeni
Minyor Pernik	0–4	Spartak Sofia
Belasitsa Petrich	0–1	Dinamo Plovdiv
Lokomotiv Sofia	8–1	Pomorie
DNA Ruse	2–1	Bdin Vidin
Botev Plovdiv	4–1	Septemvri Pleven
VVS Sofia	3–2	Levski Sofia
Torpedo Pernik	1–2 (a.e.t.)	Lokomotiv Plovdiv
Etar Veliko Tarnovo	1–3	Spartak Plovdiv

== Second round ==
Team 1	Score	Team 2
Slavia Sofia	2–1 (a.e.t.)	Zavod 12 Sofia
Spartak Pleven	1–3 (a.e.t.)	Lokomotiv Plovdiv
DNA Ruse	3–1	Svetkavitsa
Botev Plovdiv	1–0	Cherno More Varna
Haskovo	1–6	CSKA Sofia
Tundzha Yambol	1–6	Lokomotiv Sofia
VVS Sofia	0–1	Dinamo Plovdiv
Spartak Plovdiv	3–1	Spartak Sofia

== Quarter-finals ==
Team 1	Score	Team 2
Lokomotiv Plovdiv	1–4	CSKA Sofia
Lokomotiv Sofia	2–3	Botev Plovdiv
Slavia Sofia	6–0	DNA Ruse
Spartak Plovdiv	1–1 (a.e.t.)	Dinamo Plovdiv
Replay
Spartak Plovdiv	2–2 (a.e.t.)	Dinamo Plovdiv
Second replay
Spartak Plovdiv	1–0	Dinamo Plovdiv

== Semi-finals ==
Team 1	Score	Team 2
CSKA Sofia	4–2	Botev Plovdiv
Spartak Plovdiv	1–0	Slavia Sofia

== Final ==
=== Details ===
11 December 1955

CSKA Sofia	5−2 (a.e.t.)	Spartak Plovdiv
Milanov 7', 29', 108'; Panayotov 97', 113'		Dushev 40'; Deshev 60'

Vasil Levski National Stadium, Sofia
Attendance: 32,000
Referee: Yordan Takov (Sofia)

CSKA	Spartak
