= 1967–68 Bulgarian Cup =

Tournament details
- Country: Bulgaria

Final positions
- Champions: Spartak Sofia (1st cup)
- Runners-up: Beroe Stara Zagora

The 1967–68 Bulgarian Cup was the 28th season of the Bulgarian Cup (in this period the tournament was named Cup of the Soviet Army). Spartak Sofia won the competition for the first and only time, beating Beroe Stara Zagora 3–2 after extra time in the final at the Vasil Levski National Stadium.

== First round ==
Team 1	Agg.	Team 2	1st leg	2nd leg
Lokomotiv Pleven	2–5	Levski Sofia	1–2	1–3
Slavia Sofia	9–1	Kondenzatoren zavod	6–0	3–1
Rodopa Smolyan	1–5	CSKA Sofia	1–2	0–3
Metalurg Pernik	3–3 (3–4 p)	Lokomotiv Sofia	2–3	1–0
Dunav Ruse	2–1	Cherno More Varna	1–1	1–0
Tekstilets Sliven	3–6	Maritsa Plovdiv	2–0	1–6
Litex Lovech	0–3	Lokomotiv Plovdiv	0–1	0–2
Tundzha Yambol	3–5	Chernomorets Burgas	1–4	2–1
Avtostroitel Shumen	2–3	Sliven	2–1	0–2
Spartak Varna	3–3 (6–4 p)	Dobrudzha Dobrich	3–2	0–1
Dorostol Silistra	0–5	Spartak Sofia	0–2	0–3
Bdin Vidin	2–4	Spartak Pleven	2–0	0–4
Svetkavitsa	1–1 (3–2 p)	Minyor Pernik	1–0	0–1
Pomorie	1–5	Beroe Stara Zagora	1–2	0–3
Kremikovtsi	1–3	Botev Vratsa	0–1	1–2
Hebar Pazardzhik	2–2 (6–7 p)	Botev Plovdiv	1–1	1–1

== Group stage ==
=== Group 1 ===
Matches were played in Yambol and Stara Zagora

Team 1	Score	Team 2
Levski Sofia	3–1	Dunav Ruse
Lokomotiv Plovdiv	3–1	Botev Vratsa
Levski Sofia	4–2	Lokomotiv Plovdiv
Botev Vratsa	2–2	Dunav Ruse
Levski Sofia	2–2	Botev Vratsa
Lokomotiv Plovdiv	2–1	Dunav Ruse

Pos	Team	Pld	W	D	L	GF	GA	GD	Pts	Qualification
1	Levski Sofia	3	2	1	0	9	5	+4	5	Semi-finals
2	Lokomotiv Plovdiv	3	2	0	1	7	6	+1	4	
3	Botev Vratsa	3	0	2	1	5	7	−2	2	
4	Dunav Ruse	3	0	1	2	4	7	−3	1	

=== Group 2 ===
Matches were played in Plovdiv, Pazardzhik and Asenovgrad

Team 1	Score	Team 2
CSKA Sofia	2–0	Svetkavitsa
Spartak Sofia	1–1	Sliven
CSKA Sofia	2–1	Sliven
Spartak Sofia	8–1	Svetkavitsa
Spartak Sofia	3–1	CSKA Sofia
Sliven	3–1	Svetkavitsa

Pos	Team	Pld	W	D	L	GF	GA	GD	Pts	Qualification
1	Spartak Sofia	3	2	1	0	12	3	+9	5	Semi-finals
2	CSKA Sofia	3	2	0	1	5	4	+1	4	
3	Sliven	3	1	1	1	4	3	+1	3	
4	Svetkavitsa	3	0	0	3	2	12	−10	0	

=== Group 3 ===
Matches were played in Dupnitsa and Blagoevgrad

Team 1	Score	Team 2
Beroe Stara Zagora	1–1	Slavia Sofia
Botev Plovdiv	1–1	Spartak Varna
Beroe Stara Zagora	1–0	Botev Plovdiv
Slavia Sofia	3–0	Spartak Varna
Botev Plovdiv	0–0	Slavia Sofia
Beroe Stara Zagora	2–1	Spartak Varna

Pos	Team	Pld	W	D	L	GF	GA	GD	Pts	Qualification
1	Beroe Stara Zagora	3	2	1	0	4	2	+2	5	Semi-finals
2	Slavia Sofia	3	1	2	0	4	1	+3	4	
3	Botev Plovdiv	3	0	2	1	1	2	−1	2	
4	Spartak Varna	3	0	1	2	2	6	−4	1	

=== Group 4 ===
Matches were played in Dimitrovgrad and Haskovo

Team 1	Score	Team 2
Lokomotiv Sofia	0–0	Spartak Pleven
Chernomorets Burgas	3–0	Maritsa Plovdiv
Lokomotiv Sofia	4–1	Maritsa Plovdiv
Spartak Pleven	1–1	Chernomorets Burgas
Maritsa Plovdiv	2–1	Spartak Pleven
Lokomotiv Sofia	0–0	Chernomorets Burgas

Pos	Team	Pld	W	D	L	GF	GA	GD	Pts	Qualification
1	Chernomorets Burgas	3	1	2	0	4	1	+3	4	Semi-finals
2	Lokomotiv Sofia	3	1	2	0	4	1	+3	4	
3	Spartak Pleven	3	0	2	1	2	3	−1	2	
4	Maritsa Plovdiv	3	1	0	2	3	8	−5	2	

== Semi-finals ==
Team 1	Agg.	Team 2	1st leg	2nd leg
Chernomorets Burgas	4–7	Spartak Sofia	1–2	3–5
Levski Sofia	2–4	Beroe Stara Zagora	1–1	1–3

== Final ==
=== Details ===
6 June 1968

Spartak Sofia	3−2 (a.e.t.)	Beroe Stara Zagora
Gyonin 5'; Mitkov 34', 120'		Bonchev 43', 71'

Vasil Levski National Stadium, Sofia
Attendance: 18,000
Referee: Todor Bechirov (Plovdiv)

Spartak	Beroe
