= 1979–80 Bulgarian Cup =

Tournament details
- Country: Bulgaria

Final positions
- Champions: Slavia Sofia (6th cup)
- Runners-up: Beroe Stara Zagora

Tournament statistics
- Top goal scorer(s): Georgi Slavkov (Botev) (12 goals)

The 1979–80 Bulgarian Cup was the 40th season of the Bulgarian Cup (in this period the tournament was named Cup of the Soviet Army). Slavia Sofia won the competition, beating Beroe Stara Zagora 3–1 in the final at the Vasil Levski National Stadium.

== First round ==
Team 1	Agg.	Team 2	1st leg	2nd leg
24 November 1979 / 1 December 1979
Dunav Ruse	0–2	Rakovski Sevlievo	0–1	0–1
Zagorets Nova Zagora	3–14	Botev Plovdiv	0–8	3–6
Lokomotiv Mezdra	1–2	Balkan Botevgrad	0–1	1–1
Bdin Vidin	1–4	Slavia Sofia	0–1	1–3
Pavlikeni	2–8	Minyor Pernik	0–2	2–6
Balkan Belogradchik	0–9	Chavdar Troyan	0–4	0–5
Yantra Gabrovo	8–3	Akademik Svishtov	7–1	1–2
Litex Lovech	2–6	Montana	1–0	1–6
Chumerna Elena	1–2	Botev Vratsa	1–0	0–2
Rilski Sportist	1–3	Levski Sofia	1–0	0–3
Dobrudzha Dobrich	7–1	Lokomotiv Dryanovo	2–0	5–1
Asenovets Asenovgrad	0–2	Lokomotiv Plovdiv	0–1	0–1
Velbazhd Kyustendil	2–1	Chepinets Velingrad	1–0	1–1
Beloslav	0–6	Etar Veliko Tarnovo	0–1	0–5
Devnya	3–7	Cherno More Varna	1–4	2–3
Ludogorets Razgrad	5–3	Lokomotiv GO	4–0	1–3
Benkovski Isperih	1–5	Spartak Pleven	0–1	1–4
Svetkavitsa	2–5	Spartak Varna	1–1	1–4
Vihren Sandanski	1–7	Marek Dupnitsa	0–3	1–4
Akademik Sofia	5–2	Slivnishki Geroy	2–1	3–1
Strumska Slava	0–8	Pirin Blagoevgrad	0–3	0–5
Shumen	3–3 (a)	Dorostol Silistra	1–0	2–3
Maritsa Plovdiv	4–4 (a)	Minyor Buhovo	4–1	0–3
Hebar Pazardzhik	4–6	CSKA Sofia	3–2	1–4
Rozova Dolina	4–5	Gorubso Madan	2–1	2–4
Tundzha Yambol	1–5	Beroe Stara Zagora	1–2	0–3
Rodopa Smolyan	0–3	Nesebar	0–1	0–2
Arda Kardzhali	3–2	Dimitrovgrad	2–1	1–1
Minyor Radnevo	3–7	Chernomorets Burgas	3–2	0–5
Haskovo	3–6	Chirpan	1–3	2–3
Lokomotiv Sofia	5–2	Belasitsa Petrich	0–0	5–2
Metalurg Pernik	0–6	Botev Ihtiman	0–2	0–4

== Second round ==
Team 1	Agg.	Team 2	1st leg	2nd leg
8 December 1979 / 15 December 1979
Minyor Buhovo	2–7	CSKA Sofia	2–3	0–4
Chirpan	2–6	Botev Plovdiv	1–0	1–6
Arda Kardzhali	1–4	Chernomorets Burgas	0–2	1–2
Akademik Sofia	6–3	Pirin Blagoevgrad	4–0	2–3
Gorubso Madan	2–3	Beroe Stara Zagora	2–2	0–1
Balkan Botevgrad	5–2	Minyor Pernik	2–2	3–0
Chavdar Troyan	1–8	Slavia Sofia	1–2	0–6
Montana	1–4	Levski Sofia	1–2	0–2
Velbazhd Kyustendil	3–10	Marek Dupnitsa	3–3	0–7
Dobrudzha Dobrich	2–2 (a)	Etar Veliko Tarnovo	1–0	1–2
Rakovski Sevlievo	2–6	Cherno More Varna	1–2	1–4
Ludogorets Razgrad	2–4	Spartak Pleven	1–0	1–4
Shumen	1–4	Spartak Varna	1–1	0–3
Botev Ihtiman	2–4	Lokomotiv Sofia	2–1	0–3
Nesebar	4–7	Lokomotiv Plovdiv	3–4	1–3
Yantra Gabrovo	3–5	Botev Vratsa	0–2	3–3

== Third round ==
Team 1	Score	Team 2	Place
16 February 1980
Balkan Botevgrad	0–5	Slavia Sofia	Ihtiman
Botev Vratsa	2–1	Levski Sofia	Dupnitsa
Dobrudzha Dobrich	1–0	Cherno More Varna	Novi Pazar
Spartak Pleven	0–0 (a.e.t.) (3–4 p)	Spartak Varna	Ruse
Chernomorets Burgas	2–1	Botev Plovdiv	Yambol
Marek Dupnitsa	2–2 (a.e.t.) (2–4 p)	Akademik Sofia	Pernik
Lokomotiv Sofia	1–1 (a.e.t.) (3–4 p)	CSKA Sofia	Sofia
Beroe Stara Zagora	2–1 (a.e.t.)	Lokomotiv Plovdiv	Haskovo

== Quarter-finals ==
Team 1	Score	Team 2	Place
23 February 1980
Slavia Sofia	3–1 (a.e.t.)	Botev Vratsa	Veliko Tarnovo
Dobrudzha Dobrich	2–0	Spartak Varna	Novi Pazar
Akademik Sofia	2–1	CSKA Sofia	Sofia
Beroe Stara Zagora	4–2 (a.e.t.)	Chernomorets Burgas	Sliven

== Semi-finals ==
Team 1	Score	Team 2	Place
9 April 1980
Slavia Sofia	3–2 (a.e.t.)	Dobrudzha Dobrich	Targovishte
Beroe Stara Zagora	3–0	Akademik Sofia	Karlovo

== Final ==
=== Details ===
13 May 1980

Slavia Sofia	3−1	Beroe Stara Zagora
Zhelyazkov 3' (pen.), 44'; Tsvetkov 90'		P. Petkov 85'

Vasil Levski National Stadium, Sofia
Attendance: 30,000
Referee: Nikola Dudin (Sofia)

Slavia	Beroe
