= 1957 Bulgarian Cup final =

- Event: 1957 Bulgarian Cup
Levski Sofia	Spartak Pleven
2	1
- Date: 7 November 1957
- Venue: Vasil Levski National Stadium, Sofia
- Referee: Martin Macko (Czechoslovakia)
- Attendance: 28,000

The 1957 Bulgarian Cup final was the 17th final of the Bulgarian Cup (in this period the tournament was named Cup of the Soviet Army), and was contested between Levski Sofia and Spartak Pleven on 7 November 1957 at Vasil Levski National Stadium in Sofia. Levski won the final 2–1.

== Match ==
=== Details ===
7 November 1957

Levski Sofia	2−1	Spartak Pleven
Kostov 15'; Yordanov 33'		Borisov 21'

Vasil Levski National Stadium, Sofia
Attendance: 28,000
Referee: Martin Macko (Czechoslovakia)

Levski	Spartak

GK	1	(Bulgaria) Ivan Derventski
DF	2	(Bulgaria) Petar Donchev
DF	3	(Bulgaria) Yoncho Arsov
DF	4	(Bulgaria) Boris Apostolov (c)
MF	5	(Bulgaria) Ivan Georgiev
DF	6	(Bulgaria) Dimitar Dimitrov
MF	7	(Bulgaria) Stefan Abadzhiev
MF	8	(Bulgaria) Kiril Aleksandrov
FW	9	(Bulgaria) Dimitar Yordanov
FW	10	(Bulgaria) Hristo Iliev
FW	11	(Bulgaria) Aleksandar Kostov
Manager:
(Bulgaria) Georgi Pachedzhiev

GK	1	(Bulgaria) Nikola Parchanov
DF	2	(Bulgaria) Nedyalko Boev (c)
DF	3	(Bulgaria) Pasho Dimitrov
DF	4	(Bulgaria) Stefan Tsolovski
DF	5	(Bulgaria) Boris Georgiev
MF	6	(Bulgaria) Matey Varbanov
MF	7	(Bulgaria) Stoyan Zdravkov
MF	8	(Bulgaria) Svetoslav Ignatov
FW	9	(Bulgaria) Iskar Petrov
FW	10	(Bulgaria) Nikolay Ankov
FW	11	(Bulgaria) Dimitar Borisov
Manager:
(Bulgaria) Konstantin Gospodinov

== See also ==
- 1957 A Group
