= Vasil Mitkov =

Bulgarian footballer

Personal information
- Full name: Vasil Stoyanov Mitkov
- Date of birth: 17 September 1943
- Place of birth: Sofia, Bulgaria
- Date of death: 17 March 2002 (aged 58)
- Place of death: Sofia, Bulgaria
- Position: Winger

Senior career*
Years	Team	Apps	(Gls)
1962–1968	Spartak Sofia	169	(48)
1969–1975	Levski Sofia	142	(55)
Total		311	(103)

International career
1967–1972	Bulgaria	17	(3)
- * Club domestic league appearances and goals

Vasil Stoyanov Mitkov (Bulgarian: Bacил Стоянов Mиткoв; 17 September 1943 – 17 March 2002) was a Bulgarian footballer who played as a winger. He played for Spartak Sofia and Levski Sofia, and was also capped for the Bulgaria national team. He represented the nation at the 1970 World Cup.

== Honours ==
=== Club ===
Spartak Sofia

- Bulgarian Cup: 1967–68

Levski Sofia

- Bulgarian League (2): 1969–70, 1973–74
- Bulgarian Cup (2): 1969–70, 1970–71
