= 1968 Bulgarian Cup final =

- Event: 1967–68 Bulgarian Cup
Spartak Sofia	Beroe Stara Zagora
3	2
- After extra time
- Date: 6 June 1968
- Venue: Vasil Levski National Stadium, Sofia
- Referee: Todor Bechirov (Plovdiv)
- Attendance: 18,000

The 1968 Bulgarian Cup final was the 28th final of the Bulgarian Cup (in this period the tournament was named Cup of the Soviet Army), and was contested between Spartak Sofia and Beroe Stara Zagora on 6 June 1968 at Vasil Levski National Stadium in Sofia. Spartak won the final 3–2 after extra time, claiming their first ever Bulgarian Cup title.

== Match ==
=== Details ===
6 June 1968

Spartak Sofia	3−2 (a.e.t.)	Beroe Stara Zagora
Gyonin 5'; Mitkov 34', 120'		Bonchev 43', 71'

Vasil Levski National Stadium, Sofia
Attendance: 18,000
Referee: Todor Bechirov (Plovdiv)

Spartak	Beroe

GK	1	(Bulgaria) Rangel Kostadinov
DF	2	(Bulgaria) Milko Gaydarski
DF	3	(Bulgaria) Dobromir Zhechev (c)
DF	4	(Bulgaria) Hristo Milenkov
DF	5	(Bulgaria) Yosif Haralampiev
MF	6	(Bulgaria) Stoyan Kitov
MF	7	(Bulgaria) Simeon Nikolov	(substituted off) 74'
MF	8	(Bulgaria) Ivan Stoyanov
FW	9	(Bulgaria) Mihail Gyonin
FW	10	(Bulgaria) Georgi Tsvetkov
MF	11	(Bulgaria) Vasil Mitkov
Substitutes:
FW	--	(Bulgaria) Ivan Rankov	(substituted in) 74'
Manager:
(Bulgaria) Vasil Spasov

GK	1	(Bulgaria) Todor Krastev
DF	2	(Bulgaria) Petko Barokov
DF	3	(Bulgaria) Hristo Todorov (c)
DF	4	(Bulgaria) Zapryan Valchev
DF	5	(Bulgaria) Gospodin Dachev
MF	6	(Bulgaria) Zhelyo Koev
MF	7	(Bulgaria) Metodi Bonchev
MF	8	(Bulgaria) Boris Kirov
FW	9	(Bulgaria) Petar Zhekov	(substituted off) 56'
FW	10	(Bulgaria) Petko Petkov
MF	11	(Bulgaria) Georgi Belchev
Substitutes:
FW	--	(Bulgaria) Mihail Mihaylov	(substituted in) 56'
Manager:
(Bulgaria) Hristo Mladenov

== See also ==
- 1967–68 A Group
