= 1948 Bulgarian Cup =

Tournament details
- Country: Bulgaria

Final positions
- Champions: Lokomotiv Sofia (1st cup)
- Runners-up: Slavia-Chengelov

Tournament statistics
- Top goal scorer(s): P. Argirov (Loko Sofia) (7 goals)

The 1948 Bulgarian Cup was the 8th season of the Bulgarian Cup (in this period the tournament was named Cup of the Soviet Army). In the tournament entered the 10 winners of regional cup competitions. Lokomotiv Sofia won the competition for first time, beating Slavia-Chengelov Plovdiv 1–0 in the final at the Yunak Stadium in Sofia.

== First round ==
Team 1	Score	Team 2
Slivnishki Geroy	1–5	Lokomotiv Sofia
Dorostol Silistra	3–0	Montana

== Quarter-finals ==
Team 1	Score	Team 2
Belasitsa Petrich	1–2	Slavia-Chengelov
Zagorets Nova Zagora	0–2	Chernomorets Burgas
Dobrudzha Dobrich	3–1	Vinarov Pleven
Lokomotiv Sofia	7–0	Dorostol Silistra

== Semi-finals ==
Team 1	Score	Team 2
Chernomorets Burgas	0–3	Lokomotiv Sofia
Slavia-Chengelov	3–0 (w/o)	Dobrudzha Dobrich

== Final ==
=== Details ===
9 May 1948

Lokomotiv Sofia	1−0	Slavia-Chengelov Plovdiv
Stefanov 33'

Yunak Stadium, Sofia
Attendance: 12,000
Referee: Stefan Danchev (Varna)

Lokomotiv	Slavia-Chengelov
