= 1962–63 Bulgarian Cup =

Tournament details
- Country: Bulgaria

Final positions
- Champions: Slavia Sofia (2nd cup)
- Runners-up: Botev Plovdiv

Tournament statistics
- Top goal scorer(s): Aleksandar Vasilev (Slavia) (8 goals)

The 1962–63 Bulgarian Cup was the 23rd season of the Bulgarian Cup (in this period the tournament was named Cup of the Soviet Army). Slavia Sofia won the competition, beating Botev Plovdiv 2–0 in the final at the Vasil Levski National Stadium.

== First round ==
| Team 1 | Score | Team 2 |
|---|---|---|
| Slavia Sofia | 4–2 | Sliven |
| Asenovets | 0–2 | Botev Plovdiv |
| Lokomotiv Ruse | 1–1 (3–2 p) | Spartak Varna |
| Marek Dupnitsa | 6–0 | Chirpan |
| Lokomotiv Sofia | 6–0 | Hebar Pazardzhik |
| Spartak Pleven | 5–0 | Chavdar Byala Slatina |
| Spartak Plovdiv | 4–0 | Ludogorets Razgrad |
| Rudnik A.M. Pernik | 2–5 | Cherno More Varna |
| Dimitrovgrad | 2–0 | Tundzha Yambol |
| Korabostroitel Varna | 0–0 (1–2 p) | Beroe Stara Zagora |
| Montana | 0–1 | Levski Sofia |
| Dorostol Silistra | 0–1 | Spartak Sofia |
| Dunav Ruse | 1–0 | Litex Lovech |
| Arda Kardzhali | 1–2 | CSKA Sofia |
| Etar Veliko Tarnovo | 3–1 | Dobrudzha Dobrich |
| Septemvri Sofia | 2–3 | Lokomotiv Plovdiv |

== Second round ==
| Team 1 | Agg. | Team 2 | 1st leg | 2nd leg |
|---|---|---|---|---|
| Slavia Sofia | 3–1 | Beroe Stara Zagora | 1–1 | 2–0 |
| Botev Plovdiv | 10–0 | Lokomotiv Ruse | 9–0 | 1–0 |
| Marek Dupnitsa | 5–3 | Spartak Plovdiv | 3–1 | 2–2 |
| Cherno More Varna | 3–1 | Lokomotiv Sofia | 0–0 | 3–1 |
| Dunav Ruse | 5–2 | Lokomotiv Plovdiv | 3–0 | 2–2 |
| Spartak Sofia | 3–3 (5–3 p) | Spartak Pleven | 2–0 | 1–3 |
| Dimitrovgrad | 3–5 | Levski Sofia | 1–4 | 2–1 |
| CSKA Sofia | 1–1 (4–3 p) | Etar Veliko Tarnovo | 0–0 | 1–1 |

== Quarter-finals ==
| Team 1 | Agg. | Team 2 | 1st leg | 2nd leg |
|---|---|---|---|---|
| Marek Dupnitsa | 5–6 | Slavia Sofia | 3–2 | 2–4 |
| Botev Plovdiv | 3–1 | Cherno More Varna | 2–0 | 1–1 |
| Dunav Ruse | 1–3 | Levski Sofia | 1–0 | 0–3 |
| Spartak Sofia | 2–1 | CSKA Sofia | 1–0 | 1–1 |

== Semi-finals ==
| Team 1 | Agg. | Team 2 | 1st leg | 2nd leg |
|---|---|---|---|---|
| Slavia Sofia | 3–1 | Levski Sofia | 3–1 | 0–0 |
| Botev Plovdiv | 4–2 | Spartak Sofia | 1–1 | 3–1 |

== Final ==
=== Details ===
10 September 1963

| Slavia Sofia | 2−0 | Botev Plovdiv |
|---|---|---|
| Mishev 11', 62' |

Vasil Levski National Stadium, Sofia
Attendance: 40,000
Referee: Atanas Stavrev (Varna)

| Slavia | Botev |
