= Petar Velichkov =

Bulgarian footballer

Personal information
- Full name: Petar Yordanov Velichkov
- Date of birth: 8 August 1940
- Place of birth: Sofia, Bulgaria
- Date of death: 15 July 1993 (aged 52)
- Place of death: Sofia, Bulgaria
- Position: Midfielder

Senior career*
Years	Team	Apps	(Gls)
1958–1965	Slavia Sofia	164	(8)

International career
1960–1964	Bulgaria	16	(1)
- * Club domestic league appearances and goals

Petar Yordanov Velichkov (Bulgarian: Петьр Йорданов Величков; 8 August 1940 – 15 July 1993) was a Bulgarian football midfielder who played for Bulgaria in the 1962 FIFA World Cup. He also played for Slavia Sofia.

== Honours ==
=== Club ===
Slavia Sofia

- Bulgarian Cup (2): 1962–63, 1963–64

=== International ===
Bulgaria U18

- European Under-18 Championship: 1959
