= 1963–64 Bulgarian Cup =

Tournament details
- Country: Bulgaria

Final positions
- Champions: Slavia Sofia (3rd cup)
- Runners-up: Botev Plovdiv

Tournament statistics
- Top goal scorer(s): Mihail Mishev (Slavia) (7 goals)

The 1963–64 Bulgarian Cup was the 24th season of the Bulgarian Cup (in this period the tournament was named Cup of the Soviet Army). Slavia Sofia won the competition, beating Botev Plovdiv 3–2 in the final at the Vasil Levski National Stadium.

== First round ==
Team 1	Agg.	Team 2	1st leg	2nd leg
Lokomotiv Ruse	1–5	Lokomotiv GO	1–2	0–3
Svetkavitsa	1–7	Spartak Pleven	0–1	1–6
Pirin Blagoevgrad	1–6	Marek Dupnitsa	0–3	1–3
Botev Plovdiv	3–3 (8–7 p)	Septemvri Sofia	2–0	1–3
Lokomotiv Sofia	3–2	Montana	2–1	1–1
Minyor Pernik	0–1	Slavia Sofia	0–0	0–1
Minyor Dimitrovgrad	3–7	Sliven	1–2	2–5
Rodopa Smolyan	2–10	Spartak Plovdiv	2–3	0–7
Dobrudzha Dobrich	1–4	Dunav Ruse	1–1	0–3
Beloslav	6–8	Spartak Varna	4–5	2–3
Levski Sofia	11–2	Litex Lovech	8–0	3–2
Geolozhka Baza Varna	1–9	Cherno More Varna	1–4	0–5
Gigant Belene	1–6	CSKA Sofia	0–3	1–3
Maritsa Plovdiv	0–2	Lokomotiv Plovdiv	0–1	0–1
Hadzhi Dimitar Sliven	5–4	Beroe Stara Zagora	5–2	0–2
Spartak Sofia	(w/o)	Velbazhd Kyustendil	–	–

== Second round ==
Team 1	Agg.	Team 2	1st leg	2nd leg
Lokomotiv GO	3–3 (6–7 p)	Levski Sofia	3–0	0–3
Marek Dupnitsa	3–3 (3–6 p)	Slavia Sofia	3–0	0–3
Lokomotiv Sofia	6–7	Cherno More Varna	2–3	4–4
Spartak Sofia	1–2	Botev Plovdiv	0–0	1–2
Sliven	5–9	CSKA Sofia	2–3	3–6
Spartak Varna	0–3	Dunav Ruse	0–2	0–1
Spartak Plovdiv	6–3	Hadzhi Dimitar Sliven	5–1	1–2
Lokomotiv Plovdiv	2–3	Spartak Pleven	1–0	1–3

== Quarter-finals ==
Team 1	Agg.	Team 2	1st leg	2nd leg
Slavia Sofia	7–3	Dunav Ruse	4–0	3–3
Cherno More Varna	4–3	Spartak Plovdiv	3–0	1–3
CSKA Sofia	2–4	Botev Plovdiv	2–0	0–4
Spartak Pleven	2–4	Levski Sofia	1–0	1–4

== Semi-finals ==
Team 1	Agg.	Team 2	1st leg	2nd leg
Slavia Sofia	4–3	Levski Sofia	2–2	2–1
Cherno More Varna	2–4	Botev Plovdiv	1–1	1–3

== Final ==
=== Details ===
9 September 1964

Slavia Sofia	3−2	Botev Plovdiv
Vasilev 25' (pen.); Krastev 52', 73'		Kostadinov 11'; N. Ivanov 42'

Vasil Levski National Stadium, Sofia
Attendance: 31,000
Referee: Stefan Konstantinov (Varna)

Slavia	Botev
