= 1980 Bulgarian Cup final =

- Event: 1979–80 Bulgarian Cup
Slavia Sofia	Beroe Stara Zagora
3	1
- Date: 13 May 1980
- Venue: Vasil Levski National Stadium, Sofia
- Referee: Nikola Dudin (Sofia)
- Attendance: 30,000

The 1980 Bulgarian Cup final was the 40th final of the Bulgarian Cup (in this period the tournament was named Cup of the Soviet Army), and was contested between Slavia Sofia and Beroe Stara Zagora on 13 May 1980 at Vasil Levski National Stadium in Sofia. Slavia won the final 3–1.

== Match ==
=== Details ===
13 May 1980

Slavia Sofia	3−1	Beroe Stara Zagora
Zhelyazkov 3' (pen.), 44'; Tsvetkov 90'		P. Petkov 85'

Vasil Levski National Stadium, Sofia
Attendance: 30,000
Referee: Nikola Dudin (Sofia)

Slavia	Beroe

GK	1	(Bulgaria) Georgi Gugalov
DF	2	(Bulgaria) Ivan Chakarov
DF	3	(Bulgaria) Ivan Haydarliev
DF	4	(Bulgaria) Milcho Evtimov
DF	5	(Bulgaria) Ivan Iliev
MF	6	(Bulgaria) Georgi Dermendzhiev
FW	7	(Bulgaria) Atanas Aleksandrov
MF	8	(Bulgaria) Iliyaz Aliev	(substituted off) 75'
FW	9	(Bulgaria) Andrey Zhelyazkov (c)
MF	10	(Bulgaria) Botyo Malinov	(substituted off) 90'
FW	11	(Bulgaria) Chavdar Tsvetkov
Substitutes:
MF	--	(Bulgaria) Iliya Velichkov	(substituted in) 75'
MF	--	(Bulgaria) Georgi Minchev	(substituted in) 90'
Manager:
(Bulgaria) Hristo Mladenov

GK	1	(Bulgaria) Kosta Kostov
DF	2	(Bulgaria) Iliya Iliev
DF	3	(Bulgaria) Petko Tenev
DF	4	(Bulgaria) Georgi Georgiev	(substituted off) 46'
DF	5	(Bulgaria) Kancho Kasherov
MF	6	(Bulgaria) Georgi Stoyanov
FW	7	(Bulgaria) Tanyo Petrov
MF	8	(Bulgaria) Tenyo Minchev
FW	9	(Bulgaria) Petko Petkov (c)
FW	10	(Bulgaria) Tanko Tanev
MF	11	(Bulgaria) Plamen Lipenski
Substitutes:
MF	--	(Bulgaria) Tenyo Tenev	(substituted in) 46'
Manager:
(Bulgaria) Ivan Tanev

== See also ==
- 1979–80 A Group
