= 1981 Bulgarian Cup final =

- Event: 1980–81 Bulgarian Cup
| Botev Plovdiv | Pirin Blagoevgrad |
| 1 | 0 |
- Date: 5 May 1981
- Venue: Vasil Levski National Stadium, Sofia
- Referee: Yordan Zhezhov (Sofia)
- Attendance: 20,000

The 1981 Bulgarian Cup final was the 41st final of the Bulgarian Cup (in this period the tournament was named Cup of the Soviet Army), and was contested between Botev Plovdiv and Pirin Blagoevgrad on 5 May 1981 at Vasil Levski National Stadium in Sofia. This was Botev's sixth appearance in a final, while it was Pirin's first. Botev won the final 1–0 with a goal from Mitko Argirov, to claim the cup for the second time. Their first triumph was in 1962.

== Match ==
=== Details ===
5 May 1981

| Botev Plovdiv | 1−0 | Pirin Blagoevgrad |
|---|---|---|
| Argirov 43' |

Vasil Levski National Stadium, Sofia
Attendance: 20,000
Referee: Yordan Zhezhov (Sofia)

| Botev | Pirin |

| GK | 1 | (Bulgaria) Dimitar Vichev |
| DF | 2 | (Bulgaria) Rumen Yurukov |
| DF | 3 | (Bulgaria) Atanas Marinov |
| DF | 4 | (Bulgaria) Blagoy Blangev |
| DF | 5 | (Bulgaria) Slavcho Horozov |
| MF | 6 | (Bulgaria) Kosta Tanev |
| FW | 7 | (Bulgaria) Kostadin Kostadinov |
| FW | 8 | (Bulgaria) Georgi Slavkov |
| MF | 9 | (Bulgaria) Krasimir Manolov |
| MF | 10 | (Bulgaria) Petar Zehtinski (c) |
| FW | 11 | (Bulgaria) Mitko Argirov | (substituted off) 89' |
Substitutes:
| DF | -- | (Bulgaria) Trifon Pachev | (substituted in) 89' |
Manager:
(Bulgaria) Dinko Dermendzhiev

| GK | 1 | (Bulgaria) Hristo Hristov (c) |
| DF | 2 | (Bulgaria) Metodi Andreev |
| DF | 3 | (Bulgaria) Krasimir Bezinski |
| DF | 4 | (Bulgaria) Dimitar Tasev |
| DF | 5 | (Bulgaria) Yordan Samokovliyski | (substituted off) 61' |
| MF | 6 | (Bulgaria) Yordan Murlev |
| FW | 7 | (Bulgaria) Kostadin Kabranov |
| FW | 8 | (Bulgaria) Ivan Petrov |
| FW | 9 | (Bulgaria) Vasil Popov |
| MF | 10 | (Bulgaria) Metodi Stoyanov |
| MF | 11 | (Bulgaria) Hristo Denchev |
Substitutes:
| MF | -- | (Bulgaria) Rumen Stoychev | (substituted in) 61' |
Manager:
(Bulgaria) Sergi Yotsov

== See also ==
- 1980–81 A Group
