= Chavdar Tsvetkov =

Bulgarian footballer

Personal information
- Date of birth: 8 March 1953 (age 73)
- Place of birth: Svoge, Bulgaria
- Position: Winger

Senior career*
Years	Team	Apps	(Gls)
1970–1972	Sportist Svoge		
1972–1981	Slavia Sofia	224	(91)
1981–1982	Austria Wien	27	(5)
1983	Iraklis		
1983	Aris Limassol		
1984–1985	Slavia Sofia	31	(13)

International career
1974–1981	Bulgaria	57	(14)
- * Club domestic league appearances and goals

Chavdar Tsvetkov (Bulgarian: Чавдар Цветков; born 8 March 1953) is a former Bulgarian footballer who played as a winger. He played for Sportist Svoge, Austria Wien, Iraklis, Aris Limassol, and spent ten years at Slavia Sofia where he scored 104 goals in 255 matches in the Bulgarian A Group.

== Honours ==
Slavia Sofia

- Bulgarian Cup: 1975, 1980

Austria Wien

- Austrian Cup: 1982
