= 1958 Bulgarian Cup final =

- Event: 1958 Bulgarian Cup
Spartak Plovdiv	Minyor Pernik
1	0
- Date: 7 November 1958
- Venue: Vasil Levski National Stadium, Sofia
- Referee: Georgi Hristov (Sofia)
- Attendance: 20,000

The 1958 Bulgarian Cup final was the 18th final of the Bulgarian Cup (in this period the tournament was named Cup of the Soviet Army), and was contested between Spartak Plovdiv and Minyor Pernik on 7 November 1958 at Vasil Levski National Stadium in Sofia. Spartak won the final 1–0.

== Match ==
=== Details ===
7 November 1958

Spartak Plovdiv	1−0	Minyor Pernik
Dushev 60'

Vasil Levski National Stadium, Sofia
Attendance: 20,000
Referee: Georgi Hristov (Sofia)

Spartak	Minyor

GK	1	(Bulgaria) Vasil Stoynov
DF	2	(Bulgaria) Ivan Ivanov (c)
DF	3	(Bulgaria) Atanas Manolov
DF	4	(Bulgaria) Georgi Botev
DF	5	(Bulgaria) Georgi Statev
MF	6	(Bulgaria) Bozhidar Mitkov
FW	7	(Bulgaria) Todor Diev
MF	8	(Bulgaria) Tsonyo Stoynov
FW	9	(Bulgaria) Mihail Dushev
FW	10	(Bulgaria) Dimitar Vasilev
MF	11	(Bulgaria) Ivan Barbov
Manager:
(Bulgaria) Georgi Shterev

GK	1	(Bulgaria) Pantaley Videnov
DF	2	(Bulgaria) Todor Evstatiev
DF	3	(Bulgaria) Mihail Vasilev
DF	4	(Bulgaria) Rumen Nachev
MF	5	(Bulgaria) Bogomil Pushev
MF	6	(Bulgaria) Roman Dragomirov
MF	7	(Bulgaria) Vasil Romanov
MF	8	(Bulgaria) Doycho Bachev
FW	9	(Bulgaria) Pavel Vladimirov
FW	10	(Bulgaria) Kiril Aleksandrov
FW	11	(Bulgaria) Oleg Pavlov
Manager:
(Bulgaria) Evgeni Petrov

== See also ==
- 1958 A Group
