= 1942 Bulgarian Cup final =

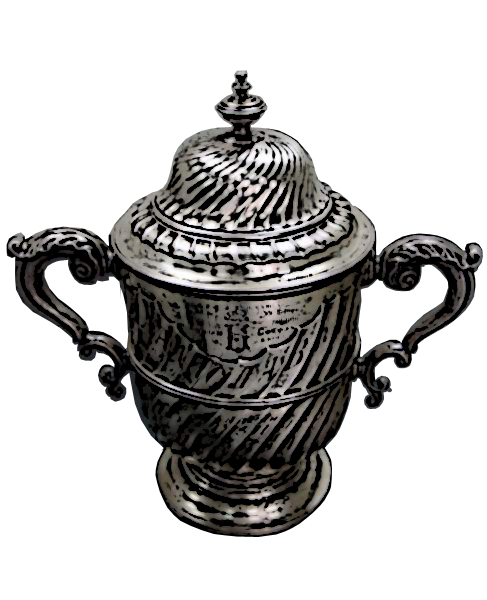
- Event: 1942 Bulgarian Cup
Levski Sofia	Sportklub Plovdiv
3	0
- (Walkover)
- Date: 3 October 1942
- Venue: Yunak Stadium, Sofia
- Referee: Todor Atanasov (Sofia)
- Attendance: 8,000

The 1942 Bulgarian Cup final was the 5th final of the Bulgarian Cup (in this period the tournament was named Tsar's Cup), and was contested between Levski Sofia and Sportklub Plovdiv on 3 October 1942 at Yunak Stadium in Sofia. Levski won the final 3–0 (walkover), claiming their first ever Bulgarian Cup title.

== Match ==
=== Details ===
3 October 1942
16:00 EEST

Levski Sofia	3−0 (w/o)	Sportklub Plovdiv
Tsvetkov 20'; Sotirov 57' (o.g.); Spasov 64'	In 72nd minute the match was canceled by Sportklub's players at 3−1 for Levski as a protest against refereeing	Paunov 66'

Yunak Stadium, Sofia
Attendance: 8,000
Referee: Todor Atanasov (Sofia)

Levski	Sportklub

GK	1	(Bulgaria) Lyubomir Aldev
DF	2	(Bulgaria) Atanas Dinev
DF	3	(Bulgaria) Zahari Radev
DF	4	(Bulgaria) Stefan Nikushev
MF	5	(Bulgaria) Lyubomir Stamboliev (c)
MF	6	(Bulgaria) Konstantin Georgiev
FW	7	(Bulgaria) Borislav Tsvetkov
FW	8	(Bulgaria) Vasil Spasov
FW	9	(Bulgaria) Bozhin Laskov
FW	10	(Bulgaria) Angel Petrov
FW	11	(Bulgaria) Stoyan Stoyanov

Manager: Asen Panchev

GK	1	(Bulgaria) Dimitar Sotirov
DF	2	(Bulgaria) Metodi Karayanev
DF	3	(Bulgaria) Boris Belkov (red card) 72'
DF	4	(Bulgaria) Dimitar Batinov
MF	5	(Bulgaria) Hristo Bachvarov
MF	6	(Bulgaria) Georgi Kirov
FW	7	(Bulgaria) Stefan Paunov
FW	8	(Bulgaria) Ivan Lazarov
FW	9	(Bulgaria) Hristo Popov (c)
FW	10	(Bulgaria) Kostadin Yanev
FW	11	(Bulgaria) Atanas Todorov

== See also ==
- 1942 Bulgarian State Football Championship
