= Ivan Kanchev =

Bulgarian footballer

Personal information
- Full name: Ivan Kanchev
- Date of birth: 22 December 1933
- Place of birth: Saranbei, Bulgaria
- Date of death: 1 February 2013 (aged 79)
- Place of death: Plovdiv, Bulgaria
- Position: Striker

Senior career*
| Years | Team | Apps | (Gls) |
| 1951–1953 | FC Zlatograd | ? | (?) |
| 1953–1956 | Spartak Sofia | 2 | (0) |
| 1956–1969 | Lokomotiv Plovdiv | 212 | (73) |

International career
| | Bulgaria | 3 | (0) |
- * Club domestic league appearances and goals

Ivan Kanchev (Bulgarian: Иван Кънчев) (22 December 1933 – 1 February 2013) was a Bulgarian footballer who played as a striker. He is legendary player of Lokomotiv Plovdiv and have 212 appearances and 73 goals in A PFG for the club. Ivan Kanchev is also "Sportsman №1 of Bulgaria" for 1968 and "Master of Sports" since 1969. He has played 16 games and has scored 6 goals in the UEFA Cup for Lokomotiv Plovdiv.

He has played in 3 games for the national team of Bulgaria.
