= Ivan Davidov =

Bulgarian footballer

Personal information
- Full name: Ivan Aleksandrov Davidov
- Date of birth: 5 October 1943
- Place of birth: Sofia, Kingdom of Bulgaria
- Date of death: 19 February 2015 (aged 71)
- Place of death: Sofia, Bulgaria
- Positions: Defender; midfielder

Youth career
- 1960–1961: Spartak Sofia

Senior career*
Years	Team	Apps	(Gls)
1961–1962	Spartak Sofia		
1962–1971	Slavia Sofia	201	(12)

International career
1965–1971	Bulgaria	11	(1)
- * Club domestic league appearances and goals

Ivan Aleksandrov Davidov (Bulgarian: Иван Александров Давидов; 5 October 1943 – 19 February 2015) was a Bulgarian football midfielder who played for Bulgaria in the 1966 and 1970 FIFA World Cups. He also played for PFC Slavia Sofia.

== Career ==
Davidov started his career at the age of 16 with Spartak Sofia, before he moved to Slavia Sofia in 1962. He spent 10 seasons of his career at Slavia, before retiring at the age of 29 in 1971. He died in 2015.
