= 2018 Bulgarian Cup final =

Финал за Купата на България 2018
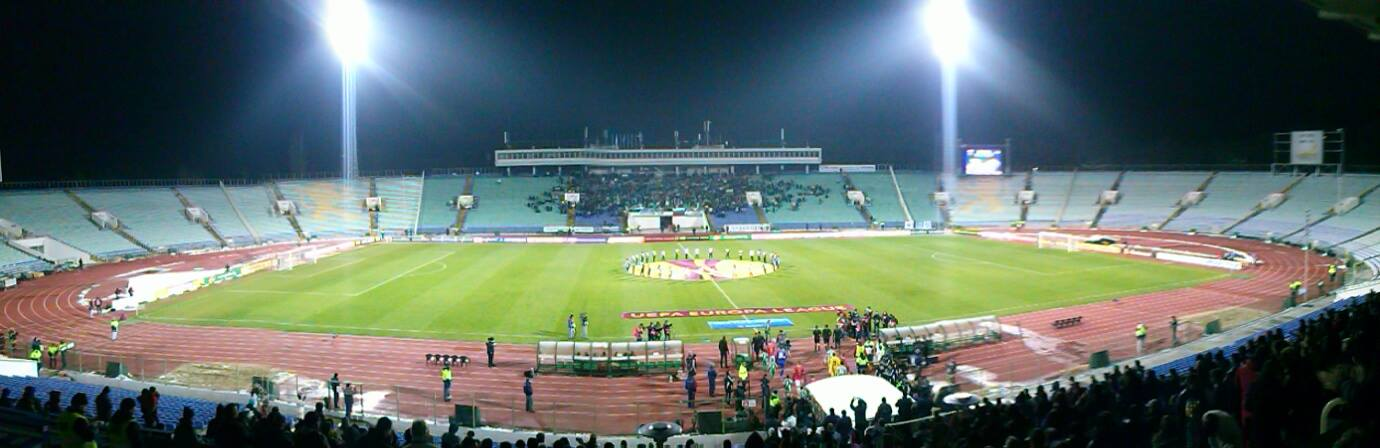
- Event: 2017–18 Bulgarian Cup
Slavia Sofia	Levski Sofia
0	0
- Slavia Sofia won 4–2 on penalties
- Date: 9 May 2018
- Venue: Vasil Levski, Sofia
- Man of the Match: Georgi Petkov
- Referee: Nikola Popov (Sofia)
- Attendance: 29,779
- Weather: Clear; 25 °C (77 °F)

The 2018 Bulgarian Cup final was the final match of the 2017–18 Bulgarian Cup and the 78th final of the Bulgarian Cup. The final took place on 9 May 2018 at Vasil Levski National Stadium in Sofia. It was refereed by Nikola Popov.

The clubs contesting the final were Slavia Sofia and Levski Sofia. The match finished in a 0–0 draw, but Slavia clinched their eighth Bulgarian Cup title by winning 4–2 on penalties.

== Route to the final ==
Slavia			Round	Levski
Opponent	Result	Legs		Opponent	Result	Legs
Chernomorets Balchik	2–0	away	First round	Botev Galabovo	1–0 (a.e.t.)	away
Lokomotiv Plovdiv	2–1 (a.e.t.)	home	Second round	Montana	1–0	away
Etar Veliko Tarnovo	3–1	away	Quarter-finals	Dunav Ruse	2–0	away
Botev Plovdiv	2(a)–2 (agg.)	1–0 home; 1–2 away	Semi-finals	CSKA Sofia	4–2 (agg.)	2–0 away; 2–2 home

== Match ==
=== Details ===
9 May 2018
19:30 EEST

Slavia Sofia	0–0 (a.e.t.)	Levski Sofia
	Report
Penalties
Minchev (penalty scored); Angelov (penalty scored); Dimitrov (penalty missed); Velev (penalty scored); Yomov (penalty scored)	4–2	(penalty scored) Nascimento; (penalty missed) Thiam; (penalty missed) Procházka; (penalty scored) Vutov

Vasil Levski National Stadium, Sofia
Attendance: 29,779
Referee: Nikola Popov (Sofia)

Slavia	Levski

GK	1	(Bulgaria) Georgi Petkov (c)	(yellow card) 11'
RB	8	(Bulgaria) Slavcho Shokolarov	(yellow card) 37'
CB	6	(Bulgaria) Kostadin Velkov
CB	55	(Bulgaria) Andrea Hristov	(yellow card) 25'
LB	77	(Bulgaria) Stefan Velev	(yellow card) 43'
DM	10	(Bulgaria) Yanis Karabelyov
CM	23	(Bulgaria) Vladislav Uzunov
AM	73	(Bulgaria) Ivan Minchev	(yellow card) 41'
RW	33	(Bulgaria) Galin Ivanov		(substituted off) 120'
LW	14	(Bulgaria) Ivaylo Dimitrov
CF	9	(Bulgaria) Tsvetelin Chunchukov	(yellow card) 80'	(substituted off) 90'
Substitutes:
GK	32	(Greece) Antonis Stergiakis
FW	7	(Bulgaria) Nasko Milev
DF	13	(Bulgaria) Stefan Velkov
DF	25	(Bulgaria) Sasho Aleksandrov
FW	29	(Bulgaria) Milcho Angelov		(substituted on) 120'
MF	35	(Bulgaria) Georgi Yomov	(yellow card) 98'	(substituted on) 90'
MF	71	(Bulgaria) Toni Ivanov
Manager:
(Bulgaria) Zlatomir Zagorčić

GK	21	(Bulgaria) Bozhidar Mitrev (c)
RB	15	(Slovakia) Roman Procházka
CB	28	(Czech Republic) David Jablonský
CB	5	(Iceland) Hólmar Örn Eyjólfsson	(yellow card) 56'
LB	4	(Bulgaria) Ivan Goranov
DM	14	(Senegal) Khaly Thiam	(yellow card) 35'
CM	13	(Spain) Jordi Gómez	(penalty missed) 12'	(yellow card) 43'	(substituted off) 82'
AM	20	(Portugal) Filipe Nascimento	(yellow card) 59'
RW	32	(France) Gabriel Obertan
LW	7	(Brazil) Paulinho		(substituted off) 120+1'
CF	9	(Romania) Sergiu Buș		(substituted off) 100'
Substitutes:
GK	89	(Bulgaria) Nikolay Krastev
DF	3	(Tunisia) Aymen Belaïd
MF	8	(Bulgaria) Antonio Vutov		(substituted on) 100'
DF	19	(Serbia) Miloš Cvetković		(substituted on) 82'
MF	26	(Cape Verde) Jerson Cabral		(substituted on) 120+1'
FW	29	(Bulgaria) Stanislav Kostov
MF	71	(Bulgaria) Vasil Panayotov
Manager:
(Italy) Delio Rossi

MATCH OFFICIALS

- Assistant referees:
  - Ivo Kolev
  - Petar Dzhuganski
- Fourth official: Georgi Kabakov (Plovdiv)

MATCH RULES

- 90 minutes.
- 30 minutes of extra-time if necessary.
- Penalty shoot-out if scores still level.
- Seven named substitutes.
- Maximum of three substitutions.
