= 1990 Bulgarian Cup final =

- Event: 1989–90 Bulgarian Cup
CSKA Sofia	Sliven
A Group	A Group
0	2
- Date: 30 May 1990
- Venue: Hristo Botev Stadium, Gabrovo
- Referee: Stefan Chakarov (Veliko Tarnovo)
- Attendance: 15,000

The 1990 Bulgarian Cup final was played at the Hristo Botev Stadium in Gabrovo on 30 May 1990, and was contested between the sides of CSKA Sofia and Sliven. The match was won by Sliven.

== Match ==
=== Details ===
30 May 1990

CSKA Sofia	0–2	Sliven
		Valkov 40'; Lechkov 76'

Hristo Botev Stadium, Gabrovo
Attendance: 15,000
Referee: Stefan Chakarov (Veliko Tarnovo)

CSKA	Sliven

CSKA:
GK	1	(Bulgaria) Iliya Valov
DF	2	(Bulgaria) Emil Dimitrov
DF	3	(Bulgaria) Trifon Ivanov
DF	4	(Bulgaria) Marius Urukov (substituted off) 75'
DF	5	(Bulgaria) Dimitar Mladenov
MF	6	(Bulgaria) Kostadin Yanchev
FW	7	(Bulgaria) Emil Kostadinov (yellow card)
MF	8	(Bulgaria) Slavcho Iliev
MF	9	(Bulgaria) Georgi Georgiev
FW	10	(Bulgaria) Petar Vitanov (red card) 73'
MF	11	(Bulgaria) Marin Bakalov (substituted off) 46'
Substitutes:
FW		(Bulgaria) Hristo Stoichkov (substituted in) 46'
DF		(Bulgaria) Stefan Bachev (substituted in) 75'
Manager:
(Bulgaria) Dimitar Penev

Sliven:
GK	1	(Bulgaria) Todor Stoyanov
DF	2	(Bulgaria) Kiril Kirilov
DF	3	(Bulgaria) Ivan Mitev
DF	4	(Bulgaria) Vasil Tinchev (c)
DF	5	(Bulgaria) Veliyan Parushev
MF	6	(Bulgaria) Vitaliy Mutafchiev
FW	7	(Bulgaria) Rumen Iliev
MF	8	(Bulgaria) Hristiyan Penev
MF	9	(Bulgaria) Yordan Lechkov (substituted off) 90'
MF	10	(Bulgaria) Ivan Vasilev
FW	11	(Bulgaria) Valeri Valkov (substituted off) 90'
Substitutes:
MF		(Bulgaria) Valentin Stefanov (substituted in) 90'
MF		(Bulgaria) Petar Ivanov (substituted in) 90'
Manager:
(Bulgaria) Lyudmil Goranov

== See also ==
- 1989–90 A Group
- 1990 Cup of the Soviet Army Final
