= 1941 Bulgarian Cup final =

| AS 23 Sofia | Napredak Ruse |
| 4 | 2 |
- Date: 3 October 1941
- Venue: City Stadium, Dobrich
- Referee: Kitso Pomenov (Sofia)
- Attendance: 10,000

The 1941 Bulgarian Cup final was the 4th final of the Bulgarian Cup (in this period the tournament was named Tsar's Cup), and was contested between AS 23 Sofia and Napredak Ruse on 3 October 1941 at City Stadium in Dobrich. AS 23 won the final 4–2.

== Match ==
=== Details ===
3 October 1941

| AS 23 Sofia | 4−2 | Napredak Ruse |
|---|---|---|
| Angelov 12', 57'; Kuzmanov 30'; Todorov 62' | | Marinov 65'; Manev 75' |

City Stadium, Dobrich
Attendance: 10,000
Referee: Kitso Pomenov (Sofia)

| AS 23 | Napredak |

| GK | 1 | (Bulgaria) Todor Dermonski |
| DF | 2 | (Bulgaria) Spas Pashkurov |
| DF | 3 | (Bulgaria) Lyubomir Petrov |
| DF | 4 | (Bulgaria) Georgi Balakchiev |
| MF | 5 | (Bulgaria) Kiril Chipev |
| MF | 6 | (Bulgaria) Mihail Bushev |
| FW | 7 | (Bulgaria) Lyubomir Angelov (c) |
| FW | 8 | (Bulgaria) Georgi Pachedzhiev |
| FW | 9 | (Bulgaria) Vladimir Todorov |
| FW | 10 | (Bulgaria) Blagoy Kuzmanov |
| FW | 11 | (Bulgaria) Atanas Despotov |

| GK | 1 | (Bulgaria) Marko Nikolov |
| DF | 2 | (Bulgaria) Nikola Kalachev |
| DF | 3 | (Bulgaria) Radoslav Dukov |
| DF | 4 | (Bulgaria) Borislav Peychev |
| MF | 5 | (Bulgaria) Angel Asenov |
| MF | 6 | (Bulgaria) Nikola Tsochev |
| FW | 7 | (Bulgaria) Lyubomir Vasilev |
| FW | 8 | (Bulgaria) Gancho Vasilev |
| FW | 9 | (Bulgaria) Kiril Manev (c) |
| FW | 10 | (Bulgaria) Tsanko Marinov |
| FW | 11 | (Bulgaria) Georgi Cholakov |

== See also ==
- 1941 Bulgarian State Football Championship
