= 1958–59 A Group =

15th season of top-tier football league in Bulgaria

A Group
- Season: 1958–59
- Champions: CSKA Sofia (9th title)
- Relegated: Beroe; Cherno More
- European Cup: CSKA Sofia
- Matches played: 132
- Goals scored: 320 (2.42 per match)
- Top goalscorer: Aleksandar Vasilev (13 goals)

The 1958–59 A Group was the 11th season of the A Football Group, the top Bulgarian professional league for association football clubs, since its establishment in 1948.

== Overview ==
It was contested by 12 teams, and CSKA Sofia won the championship for the fifth consecutive time.

== League standings ==
Pos	Team	Pld	W	D	L	GF	GA	GD	Pts	Qualification or relegation
1	CSKA Sofia (C)	22	13	6	3	37	16	+21	32	Qualification for European Cup preliminary round
2	Slavia Sofia	22	10	7	5	29	17	+12	27	
3	Levski Sofia	22	10	4	8	27	15	+12	24	
4	Spartak Plovdiv	22	8	8	6	33	29	+4	24	
5	Lokomotiv Sofia	22	10	3	9	33	28	+5	23	
6	Dunav Ruse	22	8	6	8	25	27	−2	22	
7	Spartak Pleven	22	8	6	8	24	30	−6	22	
8	Botev Plovdiv	22	8	6	8	28	41	−13	22	
9	Spartak Varna	22	6	9	7	21	24	−3	21	
10	Minyor Pernik	22	7	4	11	27	32	−5	18	
11	Beroe Stara Zagora (R)	22	7	4	11	21	25	−4	18	Relegation to 1959–60 B Group
12	Cherno More Varna (R)	22	3	5	14	15	36	−21	11	Relegation to 1959–60 B Group

Source: rsssf.com
(C) Champions; (R) Relegated

== Results ==
Home \ Away	BSZ	BPD	CHM	CSK	DUN	LEV	LSO	MIN	SLA	SPL	SPD	SPV
Beroe Stara Zagora		1–2	1–0	1–1	1–0	1–0	1–0	1–0	1–1	0–1	3–0	1–1
Botev Plovdiv	3–1		2–1	0–4	2–4	1–0	0–0	1–0	1–0	4–1	1–1	0–2
Cherno More	0–3	1–1		0–1	0–0	2–1	2–1	2–3	0–0	0–1	0–2	0–0
CSKA Sofia	2–1	6–1	3–1		2–0	2–0	2–0	2–2	2–0	0–0	0–0	2–1
Dunav Ruse	2–0	1–1	2–0	2–3		1–0	2–1	3–0	0–0	1–1	3–1	1–0
Levski Sofia	2–0	4–1	1–0	1–0	5–0		1–0	2–0	0–0	4–0	3–0	0–0
Lokomotiv Sofia	1–0	4–1	3–0	2–1	2–0	2–1		4–2	0–2	0–1	5–2	0–2
Minyor Pernik	3–1	1–3	3–1	0–1	2–1	0–0	0–1		2–0	1–0	1–1	5–1
Slavia Sofia	1–0	3–1	1–1	0–0	3–0	4–1	2–4	3–2		2–0	2–0	2–0
Spartak Pleven	2–1	4–0	3–1	0–1	2–1	0–1	0–0	0–0	2–1		1–3	2–2
Spartak Plovdiv	2–2	1–1	4–1	1–1	0–0	1–0	5–2	2–0	0–0	5–1		1–0
Spartak Varna	1–0	1–1	0–2	2–1	1–1	0–0	1–1	2–0	0–1	2–2	2–1	

Source: A PFG (in Bulgarian)
Legend: Blue = home team win; Yellow = draw; Red = away team win.

== Champions ==
CSKA Sofia

Goalkeepers
(Bulgaria) Georgi Naydenov	16	(0)
(Bulgaria) Hristo Andonov	6	(0)

Defenders
(Bulgaria) Kiril Rakarov	21	(3)
(Bulgaria) Georgi Enisheynov	5	(0)
(Bulgaria) Manol Manolov	18	(0)
(Bulgaria) Nikola Kovachev	20	(2)
(Bulgaria) Dimitar Vasilev	4	(0)

Midfielders
(Bulgaria) Gavril Stoyanov	5	(0)
(Bulgaria) Stefan Bozhkov	10	(1)
(Bulgaria) Petar Aleksiev	13	(2)
(Bulgaria) Panteley Dimitrov	7	(0)

Forwards
(Bulgaria) Krum Yanev	17	(3)
(Bulgaria) Dimitar Milanov	9	(1)
(Bulgaria) Bogomil Martinov	18	(1)
(Bulgaria) Georgi Dimitrov	15	(4)
(Bulgaria) Ivan Kolev	21	(7)
(Bulgaria) Stefan Stefanov	3	(0)
(Bulgaria) Anton Krastev	6	(2)
(Bulgaria) Panayot Panayotov	19	(7)
(Bulgaria) Nikola Tsanev	6	(0)
(Bulgaria) Sasho Varbanov	1	(0)

Manager
(Bulgaria) Krum Milev

== Top scorers ==
Rank	Scorer	Club	Goals
1	(Bulgaria) Aleksandar Vasilev	Slavia Sofia	13
2	(Bulgaria) Nikola Kotkov	Lokomotiv Sofia	9
2	(Bulgaria) Vasil Romanov	Minyor Pernik	9
2	(Bulgaria) Petar Manchev	Beroe Stara Zagora	9
5	(Bulgaria) Nikola Yordanov	Spartak Pleven	7
5	(Bulgaria) Dobromir Tashkov	Slavia Sofia	7
5	(Bulgaria) Tsvetan Stoynov	Spartak Plovdiv	7
5	(Bulgaria) Yordan Kotev	Lokomotiv Sofia	7
5	(Bulgaria) Ivan Kolev	CSKA Sofia	7
5	(Bulgaria) Panayot Panayotov	CSKA Sofia	7
5	(Bulgaria) Mihail Dushev	Spartak Plovdiv	7
