= Rayko Stoynov =

Bulgarian footballer

Personal information
- Date of birth: 1 October 1937
- Place of birth: Pazardzhik, Bulgaria
- Date of death: 17 March 2010 (aged 72)
- Position: Defender

Senior career*
Years	Team	Apps	(Gls)
1957–1958	Hebar Pazardzhik	?	(?)
1958–1959	Sliven	?	(?)
1959–1970	Botev Plovdiv	268	(16)

International career
1962	Bulgaria	1	(0)

Managerial career
- 1973–1974: Botev Plovdiv
- * Club domestic league appearances and goals

Rayko Stoynov (Bulgarian: Райко Стойнов) (1 October 1937 – 17 March 2010) was a Bulgarian international football player. On club level Stoynov won one national championship with Botev Plovdiv in 1967 and one Bulgarian Cup (with the same team) in 1962.
