= 1942 Bulgarian Cup =

Tournament details
- Country: Bulgaria

Final positions
- Champions: Levski Sofia (1st cup)
- Runners-up: Sportklub Plovdiv

The 1942 Bulgarian Cup was the 5th season of the Bulgarian Cup (in this period the tournament was named Tsar's Cup). Levski Sofia won the competition, beating Sportklub Plovdiv in the final at the Yunak Stadium in Sofia.

== First round ==
Team 1	Score	Team 2
Napredak Ruse	3–2	Maria Luiza Lom
Botev Vratsa	1–5	Spartak Pleven
Lokomotiv GO	0–1	Yantra Gabrovo
Makedonija Bitola	2–1	ZhSK Skopje
Haskovo	2–0	Tundzha Yambol

== Quarter-finals ==
Team 1	Score	Team 2
Levski Sofia	6–0	Haskovo
Makedonija Bitola	0–3 (a.e.t.)	Sportklub Plovdiv
Spartak Pleven	3–0	Yantra Gabrovo
Pobeda Varna	1–3	Napredak Ruse

== Semi-finals ==
Team 1	Score	Team 2
Napredak Ruse	0–1	Sportklub Plovdiv
Spartak Pleven	3–3 (a.e.t.)	Levski Sofia
Replay
Spartak Pleven	1–2	Levski Sofia

== Final ==
=== Details ===
3 October 1942
16:00 EEST

Levski Sofia	3−0 (w/o)	Sportklub Plovdiv
Tsvetkov 20'; Sotirov 57' (o.g.); Spasov 64'	In 72nd minute the match was canceled by Sportklub's players at 3−1 for Levski as a protest against refereeing	Paunov 66'

Yunak Stadium, Sofia
Attendance: 8,000
Referee: Todor Atanasov (Sofia)

Levski	Sportklub
