= Aleksandar Shalamanov =

Bulgarian footballer and skier (1941–2021)

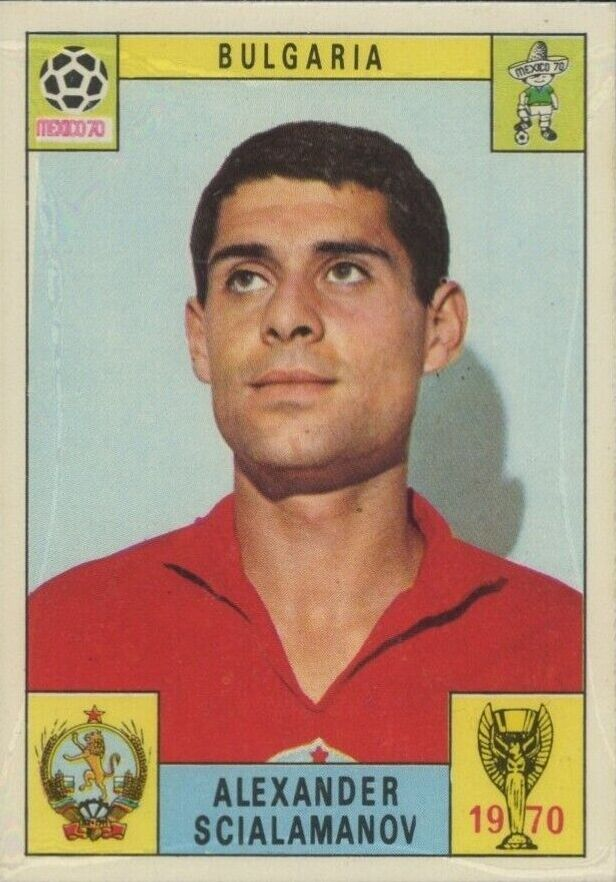
- Shalamanov at the 1970 FIFA World Cup

Personal information
- Full name: Aleksandar Stefanov Shalamanov
- Date of birth: 4 September 1941
- Place of birth: Boyana, Bulgaria
- Date of death: 25 October 2021 (aged 80)
- Place of death: Boyana, Bulgaria
- Position: Defender

Senior career*
| Years | Team | Apps | (Gls) |
| 1960–1961 | CSKA Sofia | 2 | (0) |
| 1962–1974 | Slavia Sofia | 263 | (10) |
| Total | | 265 | (10) |

International career
| 1964–1971 | Bulgaria | 42 | (1) |
- * Club domestic league appearances and goals

Aleksandar Stefanov Shalamanov (Bulgarian: Александър Cтефанов Шаламанов; 4 September 1941 – 25 October 2021) was a football player and professional alpine skier and is known as the only Bulgarian who has participated in the Winter Olympics (as an alpine skier in 1960) and in the FIFA World Cup. The 1964 Summer Olympics saw him as a reserve player of the volleyball team, but he did not play in a match.

Shalamanov began his career as a defender with CSKA Sofia in 1960–61, but moved to Slavia Sofia in 1961 to remain there until 1974, when he retired after 263 matches in the Bulgarian Championship, three Bulgarian Cup trophies (1963, 1964 and 1966) and a Cup Winners' Cup semi-final in 1967. Shalamanov has twice been selected Best Bulgarian Footballer, in 1963 and 1966, and twice Best Bulgarian Sportsman, in 1967 and 1973. He has 42 caps for the Bulgaria national team, with which he participated in the 1966 and 1970 World Cups.

On 26 October 2021, a day after his death, the team announced that the Slavia Sofia's stadium would be renamed in his honor to Aleksandar Shalamanov Stadium.

== Personal life ==
Shalamanov's son, Stefan Shalamanov (b. 1970), went on to become an alpine skier, and represented Bulgaria in two events at the 1988 Winter Olympics in Calgary, Canada.
