= Boris Apostolov =

Bulgarian footballer

Personal information
- Date of birth: 20 January 1925
- Place of birth: Sofia, Bulgaria
- Date of death: 15 January 2009 (aged 83)
- Position: Midfielder

International career
Years	Team	Apps	(Gls)
- Bulgaria

Boris Apostolov (Bulgarian: Борис Апостолов, 20 January 1925 – 15 January 2009) was a Bulgarian footballer. He competed in the men's tournament at the 1952 Summer Olympics and played for Levski Sofia.

== Honours ==
Levski Sofia

- Bulgarian Cup – 1956, 1957, 1959
