= Mihail Karushkov =

Retired bulgarian footballer

Personal information
- Date of birth: 28 October 1940 (age 86)
- Place of birth: Mihailovo, Bulgaria
- Position: Goalkeeper

Senior career*
Years	Team	Apps	(Gls)
1957–1959	Arda Kardzhali		
1959–1973	Botev Plovdiv		

International career
1963	Bulgaria	1	(0)
- * Club domestic league appearances and goals

Mihail Karushkov (Bulgarian: Михаил Карушков, born 28 October 1940) is a retired Bulgarian football goalkeeper.
