= Kiril Aleksandrov =

Bulgarian former footballer (born 1978)

Personal information
- Full name: Kiril Ognyanov Aleksandrov
- Date of birth: 17 July 1978 (age 48)
- Place of birth: Samokov, Bulgaria
- Height: 1.89 m (6 ft 2 in)
- Position: Forward

Youth career
- Rilski Sportist

Senior career*
Years	Team	Apps	(Gls)
1998–2004	Rilski Sportist	12	(2)
2004–2005	Apollon Larissa		
2005	Jaro	24	(4)
2006–2007	Rilski Sportist	25	(4)
2006	→ Marek Dupnitsa (loan)	1	(0)
2008–2010	Omonia Aradippou		
2010–2011	Nesebar	10	(2)
2011–2012	Rilski Sportist	31	(27)
2012–2013	Gudja United		
2013–2014	Lija Athletic	23	(15)
- * Club domestic league appearances and goals

Kiril Aleksandrov (Bulgarian: Кирил Огнянов Александров; born 17 July 1978) is a Bulgarian former professional football player who played as a forward.

Aleksandrov started his senior career in his native Bulgaria with his hometown club Rilski Sportist in 1998. Later he has also played in Greece, Finland, Cyprus and Malta. In Finland, he played for Jaro in the country's top-tier Veikkausliiga in the 2005 season, making 24 appearances and scoring four goals.
