= Stadion Hristo Botev (Gabrovo) =

Stadium in Gabrovo, Bulgaria

Coordinates: 42°51′36″N 25°19′11″E

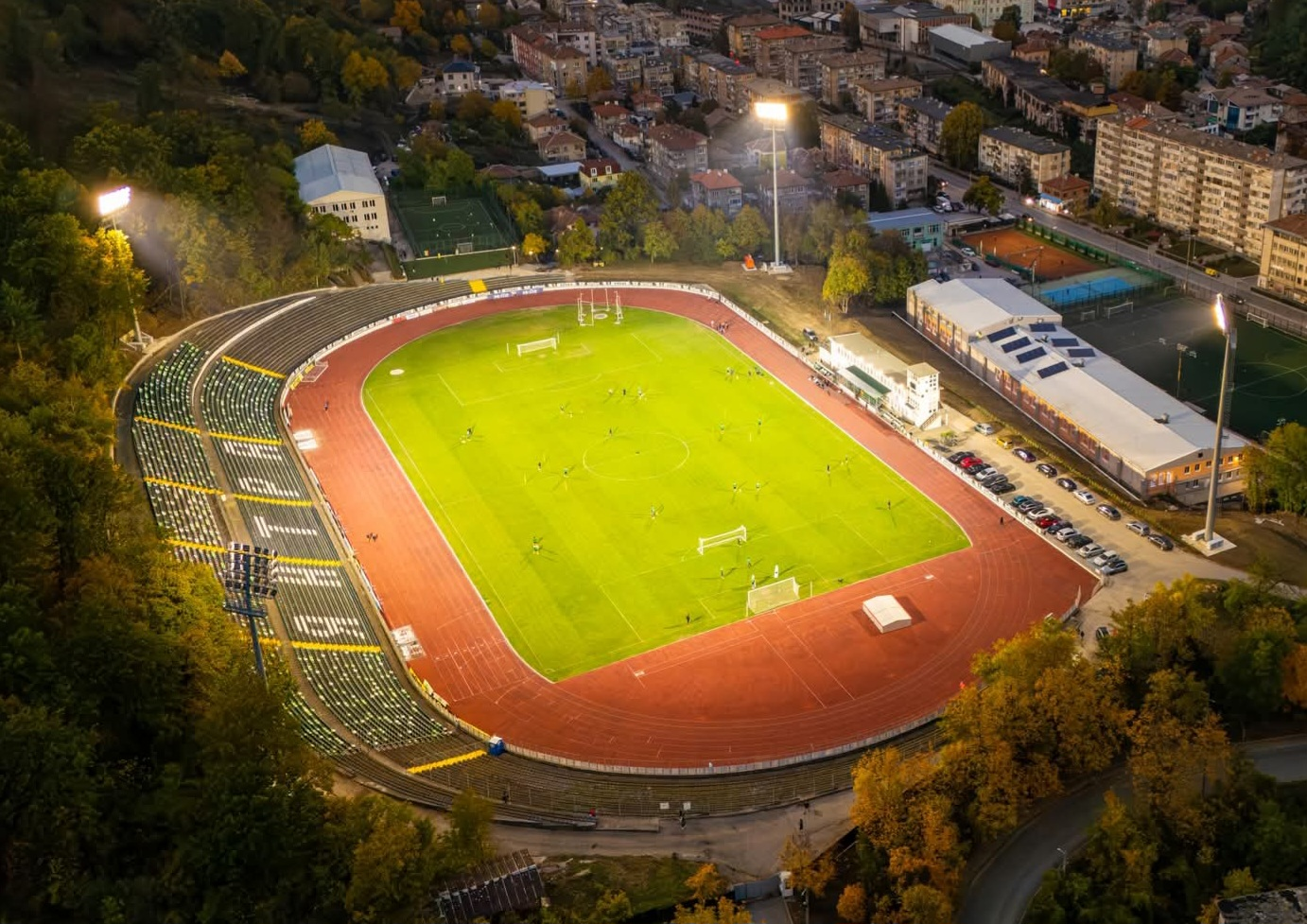
- Interactive map of Stadion Hristo Botev
- Full name: City Stadium Hristo Botev Gabrovo
- Location: Gabrovo, Bulgaria
- Owner: Gabrovo Municipality
- Operator: FC Yantra
- Capacity: 12,000
- Surface: Grass
- Field size: 101 x 67 m

Construction
- Built: 1951
- Opened: 1955
- Renovated: 1981, 2022-2025

Tenant
- FC Yantra (1955-present)

Stadion Hristo Botev (Bulgarian: Стадион „Христо Ботев“, English: 'Hristo Botev Stadium') is a multi-purpose stadium in Gabrovo, Bulgaria. This 12,000 seat stadium is currently used for football matches and is the home ground of FC Yantra.

Some interesting concerts took place at the stadium in 1988 - Uriah Heep, 2002 - t.A.T.u.
The stadium hosted the 1990 Final match of Bulgarian Football Cup between FC Sliven and CSKA Sofia which was won 2-0 by Sliven.
Every summer since 2004, the stadium is a host to a football tournament titled "Kamenitza fan cup"

== Other Pictures ==
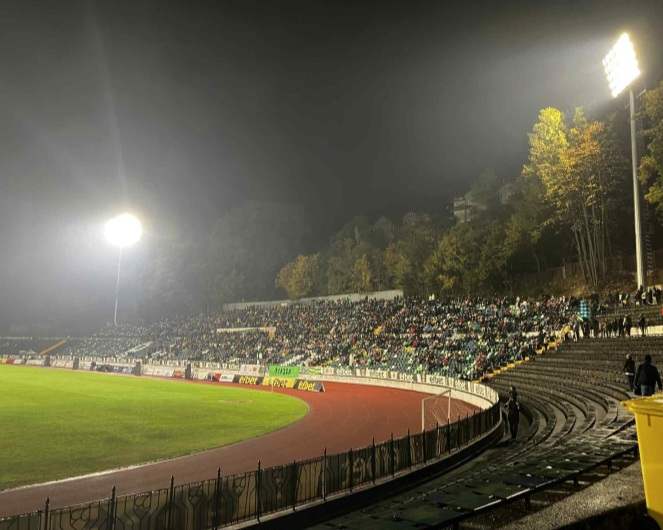
Yantra Fans
