= Lazar Hristov =

Bulgarian footballer

Personal information
- Date of birth: 18 March 1925 (age 101)
- Place of birth: Sofia, Bulgaria
- Position: Midfielder

International career
Years	Team	Apps	(Gls)
1947–1952	Bulgaria	3	(0)

Lazar Hristov (born 18 March 1925) was a Bulgarian footballer. He played in three matches for the Bulgaria national football team from 1947 to 1952. He was also part of Bulgaria's squad for the 1952 Summer Olympics, but he did not play in any matches.
