= Georgi Haralampiev =

Bulgarian footballer

Personal information
- Date of birth: 10 September 1942 (age 84)
- Position: Midfielder

Senior career*
Years	Team	Apps	(Gls)
1961–1963	Botev Plovdiv		
1964–1972	Slavia Sofia		

International career
1963–1964	Bulgaria	2	(0)
- * Club domestic league appearances and goals

Georgi Haralampiev (Bulgarian: Георги Харалампиев; born 10 September 1942) is a retired Bulgarian football midfielder.
