= Kostadin Blagoev =

Bulgarian footballer

Personal information
- Date of birth: 16 February 1927 (age 99)
- Place of birth: Sofia, Kingdom of Bulgaria
- Position: Midfielder

International career
Years	Team	Apps	(Gls)
1948–1957	Bulgaria	5	(0)

Kostadin Blagoev (born 16 February 1927) was a Bulgarian footballer. He played in five matches for the Bulgaria national football team from 1948 to 1957. He was also part of Bulgaria's squad for the 1952 Summer Olympics, but he did not play in any matches.
