= Petar Argirov =

Bulgarian footballer

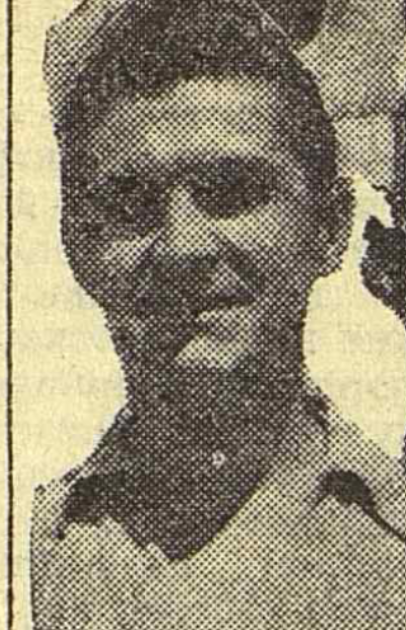

Personal information
- Full name: Петър Аргиров
- Date of birth: 19 February 1923
- Place of birth: Sofia, Kingdom of Bulgaria
- Date of death: 16 November 1989 (aged 66)
- Place of death: Sofia, PR Bulgaria
- Position: Forward

International career
Years	Team	Apps	(Gls)
- Bulgaria

Petar Argirov (Bulgarian: Петър Аргиров, 19 February 1923 – 16 November 1989) was a Bulgarian footballer. He competed in the men's tournament at the 1952 Summer Olympics.
