= FC Dorostol Silistra =

Bulgarian football club

Dorostol Silistra
- Full name: Football Club Dorostol Silistra
- Founded: 1902; 124 years ago
- Ground: Louis Eyer Stadium, Silistra
- Capacity: 12,000
- Manager: Deyan Dechev
- League: North-East Third League
- 2025-26: North-East Third League, 14th
Home colours	Away colours

FC Dorostol (Bulgarian: ФК Доростол) is a Bulgarian football club based in Silistra, who currently plays at the North-East Third League, the third division of Bulgarian football. Its home stadium "Louis Ayer" has a capacity of 12 000 seats. Club colors are blue and white. The club was officially founded in 1945. However it exists informally from 1902, which makes it the oldest Bulgarian football club.

== History ==
The original founding year of Dorostol is considered to be the year 1902. The club was originally affiliated with the Bulgarian school in Silistra, whose students founded the sports society "Strela", meaning arrow in Bulgarian. Their first kit was black, which was also the color of the uniforms of the students from the school. From 1903 to 1909, the gymnastics teacher at the school was Louis Eyer, a Swiss gymnast. In 1920, a Romanian team was founded in the area, called Dristor, later renamed Venus. This was, because at the time, Dobruja was part of Romania. After 1941, when Dobruja was given back to Bulgaria, the team is renamed to "Dorostol".

In 1949, there is a major reorganization of sports activities and clubs in the country. New sports societies emerge in the city of Silistra, such as "Cherveno Zname", "Torpedo" and "Stroitel". There is a tournament held between the teams to be decided which one will play professional football. "Cherveno Zname" wins the tournament, and is promoted to the B PFG, the second tier of Bulgarian football.

In 1958, there is another major reorganization of sports activities in the country, which unites all the teams from Silistra into one - "Dorostol". Club colors were decided to be blue and white.

In 1984, Dorostol managed to achieve something very unexpected, by reaching the final of the Cup of the Soviet Army. However, Dorostol lost 4–0 to Levski Sofia in the final.

The club was reformed in 2014, starting from V AFG, because of financial problems. In 2019, the club was disqualified from the third league, due to not having the financial availability to compete.

== Players ==
=== Current squad ===
As of 6 March 2024

Note: Flags indicate national team as defined under FIFA eligibility rules; some limited exceptions apply. Players may hold more than one non-FIFA nationality.

No.	Pos.	Nation	Player
1	GK	BUL	Martin Hristov
2	DF	BUL	Pavlin Petkov
3	DF	BUL	Georgi Dichev
4	DF	BUL	Kostadin Ivanov
5	DF	BUL	Pavel Stoev
6	DF	BUL	Damyan Petrov
7	MF	BUL	Veselin Nikolaev
8	MF	BUL	Georgi Dimitrov
9	FW	BUL	Kaloyan Kalchev
10	FW	BUL	Yanaki Smirnov

No.	Pos.	Nation	Player
11	MF	BUL	Nikolay Nikolaev
12	GK	BUL	Ivan Atanasov
13	MF	BUL	Dimitar Dobrev
14	FW	BUL	Maksim Yordanov
15	DF	BUL	Georgi Ivanov
16	MF	BUL	Sevdalin Staykov
17	MF	BUL	Nikolay Iliev
18	MF	BUL	Petko Tsankov
19	DF	BUL	Simeon Nikolov
20	DF	BUL	Aleks Popov

== Notable players ==
Had international caps for their respective countries, held any club record, or had more than 100 league appearances. Players whose name is listed in bold represented their countries.

Bulgaria

- (Bulgaria) Todor Atanasov
- (Bulgaria) **Georgi Borisov**
- (Bulgaria) **Diyan Donchev**
- (Bulgaria) **Krasimir Koev**
- (Bulgaria) **Todor Marev**
- (Bulgaria) **Martin Zafirov**
