= Aleksandar Vasilev (footballer, born 1936) =

Bulgarian footballer

Personal information
- Date of birth: 19 May 1936
- Place of birth: Sofia, Bulgaria
- Date of death: 23 July 1967 (aged 31)
- Place of death: Sofia, Bulgaria
- Position: Forward

Senior career*
Years	Team	Apps	(Gls)
1957–1960	Slavia Sofia		
1960–1961	Septemvri Sofia		
1961–1967	Slavia Sofia		

International career
1959–1966	Bulgaria	7	(2)
- * Club domestic league appearances and goals

Aleksandar Vasilev (Bulgarian: Александър Василев; 19 May 1936 – 23 July 1967) was a Bulgarian footballer who played as a forward. He was a captain of Slavia Sofia in the period 1957–1967. Vasilev scored 100 goals for the club. For the Bulgaria national football team Choko featured in 7 games and scored 2 goals. He won the Bulgarian Cup three times (all with Slavia). He died at the age of 31 years in 1967.

== Honours ==
=== Individual ===
- Bulgarian League Top Scorer: 1 time
  - 1958/59 (with 13 goals for Slavia Sofia)
