= FC Spartak Sofia =

Spartak Sofia
- Full name: FC Spartak Sofia
- Founded: 1947; 79 years ago
- Dissolved: 2007; 19 years ago
- Ground: Rakovski Stadium
- Capacity: 5,000
- Manager: (Bulgaria) Lyubomir Simov

FC Spartak Sofia (Bulgarian: ФК Спартак София) was a Bulgarian football club based in Sofia. The club was officially founded in 1947 and initially played in the regional divisions. Their home colours were blue and white and their home ground was Rakovski Stadium.

== History ==
The club was founded in 1947 following the merger of FC Rakovski, FC Yunak, and the various football clubs under the Ministry of the Interior. Spartak existed independently until 1969, when it was forcibly merged into Levski Sofia. After 1985, the club's independence was restored.

Spartak greatest achievement was lifting the Bulgarian Cup in 1968 and finishing second in the Bulgarian Championship in 1951 and 1952.

A phoenix club was created in 2015, Spartak 2015 Sofia. It currently competes in the fifth tier of Bulgarian football, B RFG Sofia south subgroup.

== Honours ==
=== Domestic ===
Bulgarian Cup:

- Winners: 1968
- Runners-up (2): 1952,1967

Bulgarian A PFG:

- Runners-up (2): 1951, 1952
- Third place in the "A" group: 1947

=== European ===
Balkans Cup

- Runners-up : 1967–68
