= Bulgarian Cup =

- Organiser(s): Bulgarian Football Union (BFU)
- Founded: 1938; 88 years ago
- Region: Bulgaria
- Teams: Various
- Qualifier for: UEFA Europa League
- Domestic cup: Bulgarian Supercup
- Current champions: CSKA Sofia (22nd title)
- Most championships: Levski Sofia (26 titles)
- Broadcaster: Nova Broadcasting Group
- Website: https://sesamecup.bg/
- 2026–27 Bulgarian Cup

The Bulgarian Cup (Bulgarian: Купа на България, romanized: Kupa na Bŭlgariya), also known as Sesame Bulgarian Cup for sponsorship reasons, is a Bulgarian annual football competition. It is the country's main cup competition and all officially registered Bulgarian football teams take part in it.

The tournament's format is single-elimination, with all matches being one-legged, except the semi-finals. The competition's winner gets the right to take part in the UEFA Europa League. If the winner had already secured a place through the Bulgarian First League, the fourth-placed team in the league substitutes it.

The competition has been dominated by Sofia-based clubs. They have won together a total number of 67 titles. The three most successful clubs are Levski Sofia (26 cups), CSKA Sofia (22 cups) and Slavia Sofia (8 cups). The current cup holders are CSKA Sofia, who defeated Lokomotiv Plovdiv on penalties in the 2026 final.

== Format ==
The Bulgarian Cup tournament is divided in two phases - the qualification phase and the final phase.

=== Qualification phase ===
In this phase are participating teams from the four groups of the amateur division V AFG (3rd level of the Bulgarian football league system) and teams from Bulgarian A Regional Football Group (A RFG) (4th level of the Bulgarian football league system).

=== Final phase ===
In this phase are participating the teams that have won their matches in the qualification phase, with the 20 teams from the two groups of B PFG (10 teams from West B PFG and 10 teams from East B PFG) and 16 teams from A PFG. The team from a lower league division is the home team. In matches between teams from the same division, the home team is determined by lot.

- Round 1 (round of 32) - 32 teams participate (the teams that have won their matches in the qualification phase, with the 20 teams from the two groups of B PFG (10 teams from West B PFG and 10 teams from East B PFG).
- Round 2 (round of 32) - 32 teams participate (16 teams from round 1 and 16 teams from A PFG).
- Round 3 (round of 16) - 16 teams participate (16 teams from round 2).
- Quarter-finals - 8 teams participate (8 teams from round 3).
- Semi-finals.
- Final.

== History ==
The Bulgarian Cup as a domestic cup knock-out tournament, has its roots in several tournaments held in Bulgaria through the early 20th century, simultaneously or successively starting in the 1910s with regional Sofia competitions.

=== Tsar's Cup ===
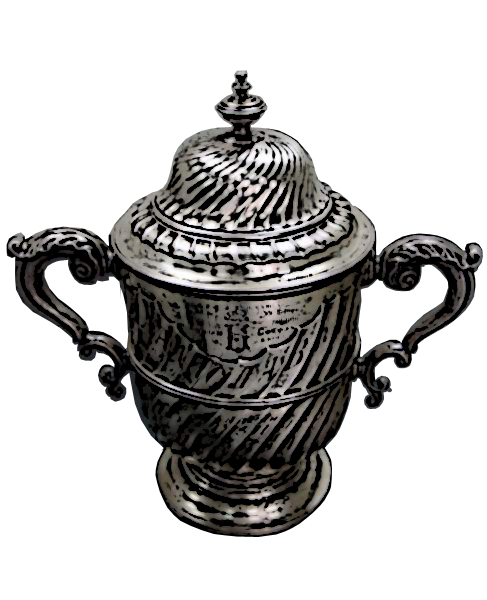
Sketch of the Tsar's Cup

The Tsar's Cup (Bulgarian: Царска купа, romanized: Tsarska kupa) is recognised as the foundation of the modern domestic cup by the Bulgarian Football Union. The cup was founded in 1924, and until 1937 (and in 1943), it was awarded to the winner of the Bulgarian State Football Championship. The championship was a knockout tournament in which the champions of the country's districts (oblasts) played in one-legged single-elimination rounds.

From 1938 to 1942, a separate tournament was held to determine the cup champion, its winners are officially recognised as domestic cup holders by the BFS.

=== Soviet Army Cup ===
An annual cup competition was not held between 1943 and 1945 due to World War II. In 1946, Bulgaria, now a communist state, reformed its football league structure and competitions alike those in the Soviet Union. The new Central Football Committee created the Soviet Army Cup (Bulgarian: Купа на Съветската армия, romanized: Kupa na Savetskata armiya) in time for the 1945-46 season. Until the end of communist administration in Bulgaria in 1990, the annual two-legged knock-out tournament was held, its winners qualified for the UEFA Cup Winners' Cup.

The Soviet Army Cup was the country's primary cup tournament up to 1982. In the following years until 1990, the championship served as a secondary cup tournament, before ceasing to exist. The Bulgarian Football Union recognises the historic winners of the Soviet Army Cup as official domestic cup holders for the seasons between 1945–46 to 1981–82. Levski Sofia, being the club to have won the tournament the most times, were given the original trophy permanently.

=== Bulgarian Cup ===
In 1981, in honour of the 1300th Anniversary of the Bulgarian State, a national knock-out football tournament was introduced, awarding the winner with the Bulgarian Cup. The Soviet Army Cup tournament gradually lost its importance due to the success of the Bulgarian Cup and in 1983 it ceded primacy to the new competition. The winners of the Bulgarian Cup from 1982-83 onwards are considered official domestic cup holders.

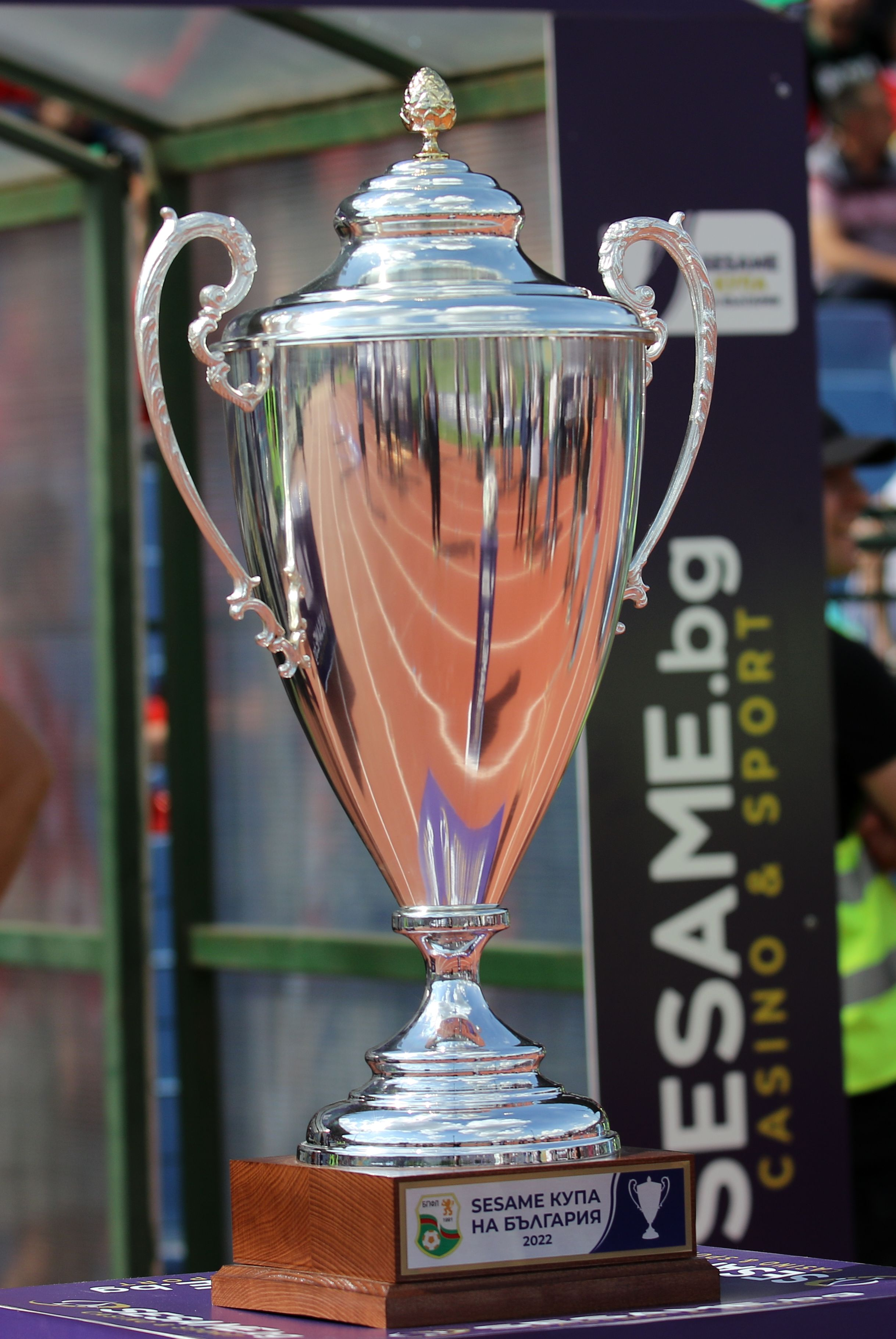
The trophy in 2022

== Records ==
The most successful club in the cup tournament is Levski Sofia, having won 26 titles. Levski Sofia also holds the record for the biggest win in a Bulgarian Cup final, winning 5–0 against Pirin Blagoevgrad in 1992 and 5–0 against CSKA Sofia in 1998. CSKA Sofia are the only team to have claimed the trophy from outside the top level of Bulgarian football, doing so in 2016, while representing the third tier of the country's football pyramid. Furthermore, CSKA Sofia hold the record for winning the most consecutive Bulgarian Cups (3 titles in a row), achieving that on two occasions, between 1972-1974 and 1987-1989.

== Finals ==
=== Performance by club ===
A summary of the performance of various clubs who have taken part in the competition is shown in the table below.

| Club | Wins | Last win | Runners-up | Last final lost | Total finals |
|---|---|---|---|---|---|
| Levski Sofia | 26 | 2022 | 12 | 2018 | 38 |
| CSKA Sofia | 22 | 2026 | 15 | 2025 | 37 |
| Slavia Sofia | 8 | 2018 | 3 | 2011 | 11 |
| Botev Plovdiv | 4 | 2024 | 10 | 2019 | 14 |
| Lovech | 4 | 2009 | 3 | 2007 | 7 |
| Lokomotiv Sofia | 4 | 1995 | 2 | 1977 | 6 |
| Ludogorets | 4 | 2025 | 2 | 2024 | 6 |
| Lokomotiv Plovdiv | 2 | 2020 | 5 | 2026 | 7 |
| Beroe | 2 | 2013 | 4 | 1980 | 6 |
| FK 13 Sofia | 2 | 1940 | — | — | 2 |
| Spartak Plovdiv | 1 | 1958 | 2 | 1959 | 3 |
| Spartak Sofia | 1 | 1968 | 2 | 1967 | 3 |
| Cherno More | 1 | 2015 | 2 | 2008 | 3 |
| Shipka Sofia | 1 | 1939 | — | — | 1 |
| Atletik-Slava 23 | 1 | 1941 | — | — | 1 |
| Septemvri Sofia | 1 | 1960 | — | — | 1 |
| Marek | 1 | 1978 | — | — | 1 |
| Sliven | 1 | 1990 | — | — | 1 |
| Pirin Blagoevgrad | — | — | 4 | 2009 | 4 |
| Levski Ruse | — | — | 2 | 1939 | 2 |
| Sportklub Plovdiv | — | — | 2 | 1942 | 2 |
| Spartak Varna | — | — | 2 | 1983 | 2 |
| Napredak Ruse | — | — | 1 | 1941 | 1 |
| Chernolomets Popovo | — | — | 1 | 1946 | 1 |
| Slavia-Chengelov Plovdiv | — | — | 1 | 1948 | 1 |
| Akademik Sofia | — | — | 1 | 1951 | 1 |
| Spartak Pleven | — | — | 1 | 1957 | 1 |
| Minyor Pernik | — | — | 1 | 1958 | 1 |
| Dunav Ruse | — | — | 1 | 1962 | 1 |
| Chernomorets Burgas | — | — | 1 | 1989 | 1 |
| Naftex Burgas | — | — | 1 | 2000 | 1 |
| Velbazhd | — | — | 1 | 2001 | 1 |
| Montana | — | — | 1 | 2016 | 1 |
| Arda | — | — | 1 | 2021 | 1 |
| CSKA 1948 | — | — | 1 | 2023 | 1 |

== Unofficial winners ==
=== Bulgarian Cup (1981–1982) ===
During the 1981 and 1982 Bulgarian Cup seasons, the tournament was a secondary cup competition.

| Season | Winner | Result | Runner-up | Date | Venue | Attendance |
|---|---|---|---|---|---|---|
| 1981 | CSKA Sofia | 1–0 | Slavia Sofia | 6 June 1981 | Vasil Levski National Stadium, Sofia | 25,000 |
| 1982 | Levski Sofia | 4–0 | CSKA Sofia | 16 June 1982 | Vasil Levski National Stadium, Sofia | 30,000 |

Notes:

- In 1981–82 the Winner of Cup of the Soviet Army, Lokomotiv Sofia still qualified for the next edition of 1982–83 European Cup Winners' Cup.
- From 1982–83 onward the Bulgarian Cup was the major Cup tournament.
- From 1981 until 1990 there were two Cup tournaments.
- UEFA doesn't recognize as official the 1981 and 1982 tournaments of the Bulgarian Cup and also doesn't recognize as official the Cup of the Soviet Army (1983–1990). This fact has been acknowledged by the article of Lyubomir Serafimov, a football statistician. Its significant that the participants in the 1981–82 European Cup Winners' Cup and 1982–83 European Cup Winners' Cup are teams who won the last two Official Cups of the Soviet Army - Botev Plovdiv and Lokomotiv Sofia.

== Sponsorship ==
From 1997 to 2011 the Bulgarian Cup was sponsored by the American car manufacturer Ford and its official distributor in Bulgaria Moto-Pfohe.

Between season 2011–12 and 2013–14 the Bulgarian Cup was sponsored by the Bulgarian Corporate Commercial Bank.

Between season 2014–15 and 2020–21 there was no sponsor.

Since season 2021–22 the Bulgarian Cup is sponsored by gambling company Sesame.
