= List of PFC Botev Plovdiv seasons =

PFC Botev Plovdiv (Bulgarian: „Ботев“ Пловдив), commonly referred to as Botev Plovdiv or simply Botev, is a Bulgarian professional association football club based in Plovdiv, Bulgaria, that currently competes in the Bulgarian Parva Liga, the top flight of Bulgarian football. Founded on 11 March 1912, it is the country's oldest active football club.

This is a list of Botev Plovdiv's achievements in major competitions in Bulgarian and European football. It covers all seasons from 1924 (the beginning of competitive football in Bulgaria), to the most recent completed season.

The club has won 2 Bulgarian Championships, 6 Plovdiv City Championships, 4 Bulgarian Cups, 1 Bulgarian Supercup and 1 Balkans Cup.

== Seasons ==
=== 1924 – 1948 ===
*In this period, apart from three seasons between 1937 and 1940, there was no national league in Bulgaria. Instead, there was a national knockout competition called the State Football Championship, which determined the champion of Bulgaria. The qualification rules for this championship were constantly changing, with Botev sometimes being able to qualify directly through the Plovdiv City Championship, while at other times having to compete for the Regional Championship against a team from the region. For most of this period, there was also no separate competition for the Bulgarian Cup.

Season	League										PRC	SFC	National Cup
Season	Division	Pos	Pl	W	D	L	GF	GA	GD	Pts	PRC	SFC	National Cup
1924	PCC (I)	2nd	7	4	0	3	15	12	+3	8			
1924 – 25	PCC	2nd	14	8	2	4	42	26	+16	18			
1925 – 26	PCC	1st	10	8	0	2	30	12	+18	16	RU		
1926 – 27	PCC	3rd	10	4	2	4	21	18	+3	10			
1927 – 28	PCC										RU		
1928 – 29	PCC	1st	10	9	1	0	25	8	+17	19	W	W	TC – W
1929 – 30	PCC	1st	10	9	0	1	32	9	+23	18	W	SF	
1930 – 31	PCC	1st	10	8	1	1	35	9	+26	17		R1	
1931 – 32	PCC	2nd	10	7	2	1	24	6	+18	16			
1932 – 33	PCC	2nd	10	7	1	2	25	10	+15	15			
1933 – 34	PCC	3rd	10	5	2	3	19	20	-1	12			
1934 – 35	PCC	2nd	14	11	1	2	38	15	+23	23			
1935 – 36	PCC	3rd	16	6	3	7	28	27	+1	15			
1936 – 37	PCC (I)	1st	14	12	0	2	35	12	+23	24	W	SF	
1937 – 38	NFD (I)	9th	18	5	2	11	28	44	-16	12			TC – RR
1938 – 39	PCC (II)	2nd	12	8	2	2	29	11	+18	18			TC – R16
1939 – 40	PCC (II)	1st	10	8	0	2	24	12	+12	16	W		TC – RR
1940 – 41	SBFD (I)	4th	14	5	6	3	33	22	+11	16			TC – RR
1941 – 42	PCC (I)	2nd	12	5	4	3	26	16	+10	14		R1	TC – RR
1942 – 43	PCC	2nd	12	5	5	2	15	17	-2	15		SF	
1943 – 44	PCC	2nd	14	9	1	4	29	14	+15	19		R1	
1944 – 45	PCC	2nd	4	3	0	1	19	4	+15	6		QF	
1945 – 46	PCC	2nd	6	4	1	1	13	7	+6	9	W	R16	CSA – RR
1946 – 47	PCC	4th	6	2	2	2	8	11	-3	6			CSA – F
1947 – 48	PRC (I)	2nd	14	9	4	1	36	8	+28	22		R16	CSA – RR

=== 1948 – 1980 ===
*A national league was established again, this time for good.

Season	League										CSA	Europe	Top goalscorer	
Season	Division	Pos	Pl	W	D	L	GF	GA	GD	Pts	CSA	Europe	Name	Goals
1948 – 49	Southern Division (II)	1st	10	7	2	1	28	9	+19	16	RR			
1948 – 49	QT	3rd	12	4	5	3	23	17	+6	13	RR			
1949 – 50	A Group (I)	6th	2	1	0	1	2	4	-2	2	RR			
1950	PRC (III)	2nd	14	11	1	2	63	15	+48	23	RR			
1951	A Group (I)	10th	22	6	5	11	26	32	-6	17	R16			
1952	A Group	9th	22	9	1	12	17	25	-8	19	SF			
1953	A Group (I)	11th	28	8	8	12	29	31	-2	24	R1			
1954	B Group (II)	1st	22	14	8	0	47	9	+38	36	RR			
1955	A Group (I)	10th	26	9	8	9	27	31	-4	26	SF			
1956	A Group	3rd	22	9	7	6	27	20	+7	25	RU			
1957	A Group	8th	22	6	7	9	22	33	-11	19	R16			
1958	A Group	9th	11	3	3	5	14	18	-4	9	R16			
1958 – 59	A Group	8th	22	8	6	8	28	41	-13	22	QF			
1959 – 60	A Group	7th	22	8	5	9	30	31	-1	21	R16			
1960 – 61	A Group	3rd	26	10	9	7	50	41	+9	29	SF		Ivan Sotirov	20
1961 – 62	A Group	4th	26	8	11	7	43	38	+5	27	W			
1962 – 63	A Group	2nd	30	17	6	7	55	26	+29	40	RU	CWC – QF	Georgi Asparuhov	20
1963 – 64	A Group	7th	30	13	4	13	43	54	-11	30	RU			
1964 – 65	A Group	12th	30	9	9	12	40	49	-9	27	R32			
1965 – 66	A Group	10th	30	9	9	12	41	39	+2	27	R16		Dobrin Nenov	14
1966 – 67	A Group	1st	30	13	12	5	39	24	+15	38	GP		Dinko Dermendzhiev	14
1967 – 68	A Group	6th	30	10	10	10	52	49	+3	30	GP	EC – R32	Dinko Dermendzhiev	14
1968 – 69	A Group	6th	30	11	6	13	51	48	+3	28	SF	ICFC – R1	Dinko Dermendzhiev	21
1969 – 70	A Group	4th	30	15	4	11	48	34	+14	34	QF		Dinko Dermendzhiev	18
1970 – 71	A Group	5th	30	13	6	11	53	50	+3	32	QF	ICFC – R1		
1971 – 72	A Group	6th	34	14	7	13	54	37	+7	35	QF	BC – W	Dinko Dermendzhiev	16
1972 – 73	A Group	9th	34	12	8	14	44	44	0	32	QF			
1973 – 74	A Group	10th	30	7	13	10	36	42	-6	27	R32		Dinko Dermendzhiev	13
1974 – 75	A Group	10th	30	12	4	14	41	55	-14	28	QF		Ivan Pritargov	20
1975 – 76	A Group	6th	30	10	12	8	24	26	-2	32	R32			
1976 – 77	A Group	11th	30	7	13	10	36	40	-4	27	R32			
1977 – 78	A Group	4th	30	13	6	11	39	36	+3	32	QF		Anton Milkov	14
1978 – 79	A Group	8th	30	9	11	10	45	45	0	29	R32	UC – R1	Georgi Slavkov	12
1979 – 80	A Group	5th	30	14	5	11	39	38	+1	33	R16		Krasimir Manolov	11

=== 1980 – 1990 ===
*The tournament for the Bulgarian Cup was established. At first, it was a secondary tournament, but from the 1982–83 season, it became the National Cup, with the Cup of the Soviet Army becoming the secondary tournament instead.

Season	League										BG Cup	SA Cup*	Europe	Top goalscorer		Avg. Attend.
Season	Division	Pos	Pl	W	D	L	GF	GA	GD	Pts	BG Cup	SA Cup*	Europe	Name	Goals	Avg. Attend.
1980 – 81	A Group	3rd	30	15	5	10	64	40	+24	35	3rd	W	BC – RU	Georgi Slavkov	31	
1981 – 82	A Group	7th	30	13	4	13	46	42	+4	30	3rd	R32	CWC – R32	Kostadin Kostadinov / Mitko Argirov	11	
1982 – 83	A Group	3rd	30	16	6	8	62	40	+22	38	R16	R64		Antim Pehlivanov	20	13,733
1983 – 84	A Group	9th	30	11	7	12	64	58	+6	29	RU	R32	IC-GP	Kostadin Kostadinov	15	14,233
1984 – 85	A Group	3rd	30	15	5	10	68	32	+36	33	3rd	R16	CWC – R16	Atanas Pashev	17	13,100
1985 – 86	A Group	2nd	30	18	6	6	82	38	+44	41	R4	SF	EC – R32	Atanas Pashev	30	12,800
1986 – 87	A Group	3rd	30	16	7	7	57	30	+27	39	R16	R16	UC – R3			9,733
1987 – 88	A Group	3rd	30	15	9	6	52	31	+21	39	QF	R16	UC – R1	Atanas Pashev	17	12,600
1988 – 89	A Group	4th	30	12	9	9	49	36	+13	33	SF	R16	UC – R1	Antim Pehlivanov	11	8,538
1989 – 90	A Group	7th	30	15	3	12	43	39	+4	33	R1	RU		Antim Pehlivanov	13	11,133

=== 1990 – ===
*The Cup of the Soviet Army folds after the fall of communism in Bulgaria. In its place the BFU creates the Cup of the BFU, but it also folds after just one season. A few years later, the football authorities again try to establish a secondary cup competition through the creation of the Cup of the PFL (Professional Football League), but it survives just three seasons, as it was not taken seriously by the top clubs in Bulgaria. From the 2003 – 04 season, there is an annual match between the league champion and the Bulgarian Cup holder, which determines the winner of the Bulgarian Supercup.

Season	League										BG Cup	Other	Europe	Top goalscorer		Avg. Attend.
Season	Division	Pos	Pl	W	D	L	GF	GA	GD	Pts	BG Cup	Other	Europe	Name	Goals	Avg. Attend.
1990 – 91	A Group	5th	30	12	10	7	49	41	+8	36	RU	CB – QF		Yasen Petrov	11	5,500
1991 – 92	A Group	4th	30	13	11	6	46	27	+19	37	SF		IC – GP	Marin Bakalov / Todor Zaytsev / Boris Hvoynev	9	12,467
1992 – 93	A Group	3rd	30	16	6	8	55	33	+22	38	RU		UC – R1	Yasen Petrov	10	6,933
1993 – 94	A Group	3rd	28	15	5	8	50	29	+21	50	R32		UC – R1	Boris Hvoynev	11	10,500
1994 – 95	A Group	3rd	30	18	6	6	66	31	+35	60	RU	CP – R32	Banned	Boris Hvoynev	12	7,786
1995 – 96	A Group	10th	30	10	6	14	33	38	-5	36	R32	CP – 8th	UC – R64			
1996 – 97	A Group	5th	30	14	3	13	41	41	0	45	R32	CP – GS		Geno Dobrevski	13	
1997 – 98	A Group	11th	30	11	3	16	35	48	-13	36	R16					
1998 – 99	A Group	13th	30	9	5	16	34	55	-21	32	R16			Dimitar Telkiyski	11	
1999 – 00	A Group	8th	30	12	4	14	43	42	+1	40	QF			Anastas Petrov	10	8,400
2000 – 01	Premier League (I)	13th	26	6	2	18	28	55	-27	20	QF					5,000
2001 – 02	B Group (II)	3rd	24	13	7	4	36	19	+17	46	R16			Borislav Dimitrov	13	3,292
2002 – 03	Premier League (I)	12th	26	6	3	17	26	61	-35	21	R32			Borislav Dimitrov	9	3,973
2003 – 04	A Group (I)	14th	30	7	6	17	33	60	-27	27	R16					3,993
2004 – 05	B Group (II)	2nd	30	21	5	4	64	21	+43	68	QF			Emil Urumov / Kostadin Vidolov	13	
2005 – 06	A Group (I)	13th	28	4	12	12	20	38	-18	24	R32					5,964
2006 – 07	A Group	10th	30	11	4	15	41	45	-4	37	R16					4,580
2007 – 08	A Group	12th	30	8	6	16	36	54	-18	30	SF			Georgi Hristov	19	5,000
2008 – 09	A Group	13th	30	8	6	16	31	50	-19	30	R32					4,158
2009 – 10	A Group (I)	16th	30	1	4	25	12	78	-66	1	R32					2,439
2010 – 11	V Group (III)	1st	38	37	1	0	127	15	+112	112	RR			Atanas Kurdov	46	
2011 – 12	B Group (II)	2nd	27	14	9	4	40	17	+23	51	QF			Aleksandar Aleksandrov	8	2,804
2012 – 13	A Group (I)	4th	30	18	6	6	51	21	+30	60	R16			Ivan Tsvetkov	17	8,071
2013 – 14	A Group	4th	38	18	11	9	57	32	+25	65	RU		EL – 3QR	Anicet Abel	10	3,745
2014 – 15	A Group	6th	32	12	6	14	38	39	-1	42	R16	SC – RU	EL – 2QR	Ivan Tsvetkov	7	2,169
2015 – 16	A Group	7th	32	8	9	15	27	44	-17	33	R16			Lachezar Baltanov	7	2,194
2016 – 17	First League (I)	8th	32	13	5	14	51	50	+1	44	W			João Paulo	12	1,906
2017 – 18	First League	5th	36	15	11	10	62	49	+13	56	SF	SC – W	EL – 3QR	Steven Petkov	15	1,829
2018 – 19	First League	6th	36	14	8	14	44	36	+8	50	RU			Todor Nedelev	14	1,946
2019 – 20	First League	7th	29	10	6	13	32	34	-2	36	SF			Todor Nedelev	9	2,154
2020 – 21	First League	10th	32	7	11	14	34	52	-18	32	R16			Atanas Iliev	16	
2021 – 22	First League	3rd	31	15	8	8	38	33	+5	53	R32					
2022 – 23	First League	10th	36	10	6	20	41	49	-8	36	R16		ECL – 2QR	Antoine Baroan	14	
2023 – 24	First League	9th	36	12	9	15	50	42	+8	45	W			Antoine Baroan	8	
2024 – 25	First League	6th	36	16	8	12	43	43	0	56	QF					

== Key ==
Winners	Runners-up	Third/SF	Promotion	Relegation

- Pos - Position
- Pts - Points
- Pl - Matches Played
- GF - Goals Scored
- GA - Goals Against
- PCC - Plovdiv City Championship
- RG - Regional Championship
- NFD - National Football Division
- SBFD - South Bulgarian Football Division
- QT - Qualification Tournament
- BG Cup - Bulgarian Cup
- SA Cup - Cup of the Soviet Army / Soviet Army Cup
- SC - Supercup
- IC - Intertoto Cup
- CB - Cup of BFU
- CP - Cup of PFL
- ICFC - Inter-Cities Fairs Cup
- BC - Balkans Cup
- EL - Europa League
- UC - UEFA Cup
- CWC - Cup Winners' Cup
- EC - European Cup
- n/a - The competition hasn't been established yet, has ceased to exist or there is no information.
- GP – Group Phase
- W - Winners
- RU - Runners-up
- SF - Semi-finals
- QF - Quarter-finals
- R16/R32/R64 - Round of 16, Round of 32, Round of 64
- R1/R2/R3 - Round 1, Round 2, Round 3
- (I)/(II)/(III) - Shows the level of the league the club plays in after a promotion/relegation or a restructuring of the league system
