= List of Botev Plovdiv managers =

The following is a list of managers of Bulgarian side Botev Plovdiv.

== Managerial history ==
Key
* Served as caretaker manager.

Name	Nat.	From	To	Honours
Nikola Shterev	BGR	1917	1934	1 Bulgarian League
Ivan Gutev	BGR	1934	1941	–
Simeon Pavlov	BGR	1944	1945	–
Vasil Kutsarov	BGR	1946	1951	–
Bozhidar Kapustin	YUG	1951	1953	–
Borislav Gabrovski	BGR	1953	1953	–
Georgi Ghenov	BGR	1953	1966	1 Bulgarian Cup
Vasil Spasov	BGR	1966	1967	1 Bulgarian League
Georgi Chakarov	BGR	1967	1969	–
Vasil Spasov	BGR	1969	1970	–
Georgi Chakarov	BGR	1970	1973	1 Balkans Cup
Gavril Stoyanov	BGR	1973	1975	–
Todor Todorov	BGR	1975	1975	–
Sergi Yotsov	BGR	1975	1975	–
Dobrin Nenov	BGR	1975	1977	–
Ivan Manolov	BGR	1977	1979	–
Dinko Dermendzhiev	BGR	1979	1984	1 Bulgarian Cup
Ivan Gluhchev	BGR	1 July 1984	30 June 1989	–
Dinko Dermendzhiev	BGR	1989	1991	–
Petar Zehtinski	BGR	September 1991	June 1992	–
Dinko Dermendzhiev	BGR	June 1992	October 1992	–
Petar Zehtinski	BGR	October 1992	June 1993	–
Dinko Dermendzhiev	BGR	June 1993	September 1993	–
Pavel Panov	BGR	October 1993	June 1995	–
Kostadin Kostadinov	BGR	10 December 1995	5 November 1996	–
Georgi Popov	BGR	5 November 1996	10 September 1997	–
Dinko Dermendzhiev*	BGR	16 September 1997	20 December 1997	–
Marin Bakalov	BGR	20 December 1997	5 June 1998	–
Petar Zehtinski	BGR	6 June 1998	29 August 1999	–
Marin Bakalov	BGR	29 August 1999	10 April 2000	–
Dinko Dermendzhiev*	BGR	10 April 2000	22 May 2000	–
Marin Bakalov	BGR	26 June 2000	1 November 2000	–
Dimitar Mladenov	BGR	1 November 2000	10 March 2001	–
Dinko Dermendzhiev*	BGR	12 March 2001	8 May 2001	–
Georgi Lazarov*	BGR	9 May 2001	18 June 2001	–
Petar Kurdov	BGR	18 June 2001	10 September 2001	–
Krasimir Manolov	BGR	11 September 2001	2 January 2002	–
Tencho Tenev	BGR	2 January 2002	19 July 2002	–
Kostadin Kostadinov	BGR	19 July 2002	20 October 2003	–
Mitko Dzhorov	BGR	20 October 2003	26 October 2003	–
Trifon Pachev	BGR	26 October 2003	30 August 2004	–
Yasen Petrov	BGR	30 August 2004	27 November 2005	–
Atanas Marinov	BGR	20 January 2006	31 May 2006	–
Svetoslav Garkov	BGR	30 June 2006	3 October 2007	–
Tencho Tenev	BGR	3 October 2007	30 May 2008	–
Kostadin Angelov	BGR	1 June 2008	15 June 2009	–
Petar Penchev*	BGR	18 June 2009	1 September 2009	–
Enrico Piccioni	ITA	1 September 2009	15 December 2009	–
Marin Bakalov	BGR	15 June 2010	20 February 2011	–
Kostadin Vidolov	BGR	20 February 2011	15 May 2011	–
Petar Houbchev	BGR	15 May 2011	26 October 2011	–
Milen Radukanov	BGR	26 October 2011	26 March 2012	–
Kostadin Vidolov*	BGR	26 March 2012	5 June 2012	–
Ferario Spasov	BGR	5 June 2012	10 December 2012	–
Stanimir Stoilov	BGR	1 January 2013	4 June 2014	–
Lyuboslav Penev	BGR	6 June 2014	7 July 2014	–
Velislav Vutsov	BGR	14 July 2014	3 December 2014	–
Petar Penchev	BGR	3 December 2014	29 July 2015	–
Ermin Šiljak	SVN	29 July 2015	10 November 2015	–
Nikolay Kostov	BGR	11 November 2015	24 August 2016	–
Nikolay Mitov	BGR	30 August 2016	30 August 2016	–
Nikolay Kirov	BGR	24 August 2016	29 May 2019	1 Bulgarian Cup; 1 Bulgarian Supercup
Željko Petrović	MNE	9 June 2019	16 October 2019	–
Ferario Spasov	BGR	8 October 2019	6 October 2020	–
Petar Penchev*	BGR	6 October 2020	6 December 2020	–
Stefan Stoyanov*	BGR	7 December 2020	6 January 2021	–
Azrudin Valentić	BIH	8 January 2021	28 July 2022	–
Artur Hovhannisyan*	ARM	29 July 2022	2 August 2022	–
Željko Kopić	HRV	3 August 2022	6 December 2022	–
Bruno Baltazar	POR	3 January 2023	23 May 2023	–
Stefan Stoyanov*	BGR	25 May 2023	6 June 2023	–
Stanislav Genchev	BGR	8 June 2023	22 August 2023	–
Rafael Ferreira*	BRA	22 August 2023	3 September 2023	–
Dušan Kerkez	BIH	4 September 2023	31 May 2025	1 Bulgarian Cup
Nikolay Kirov	BGR	29 June 2025	25 September 2025	–
Ivan Tsvetanov*	BGR	26 September 2025	8 November 2025	–
Dimitar Dimitrov	BGR	17 November 2025	16 February 2026	–
Lachezar Baltanov*	BGR	19 February 2026		–
