= 1991 Bulgarian Cup final =

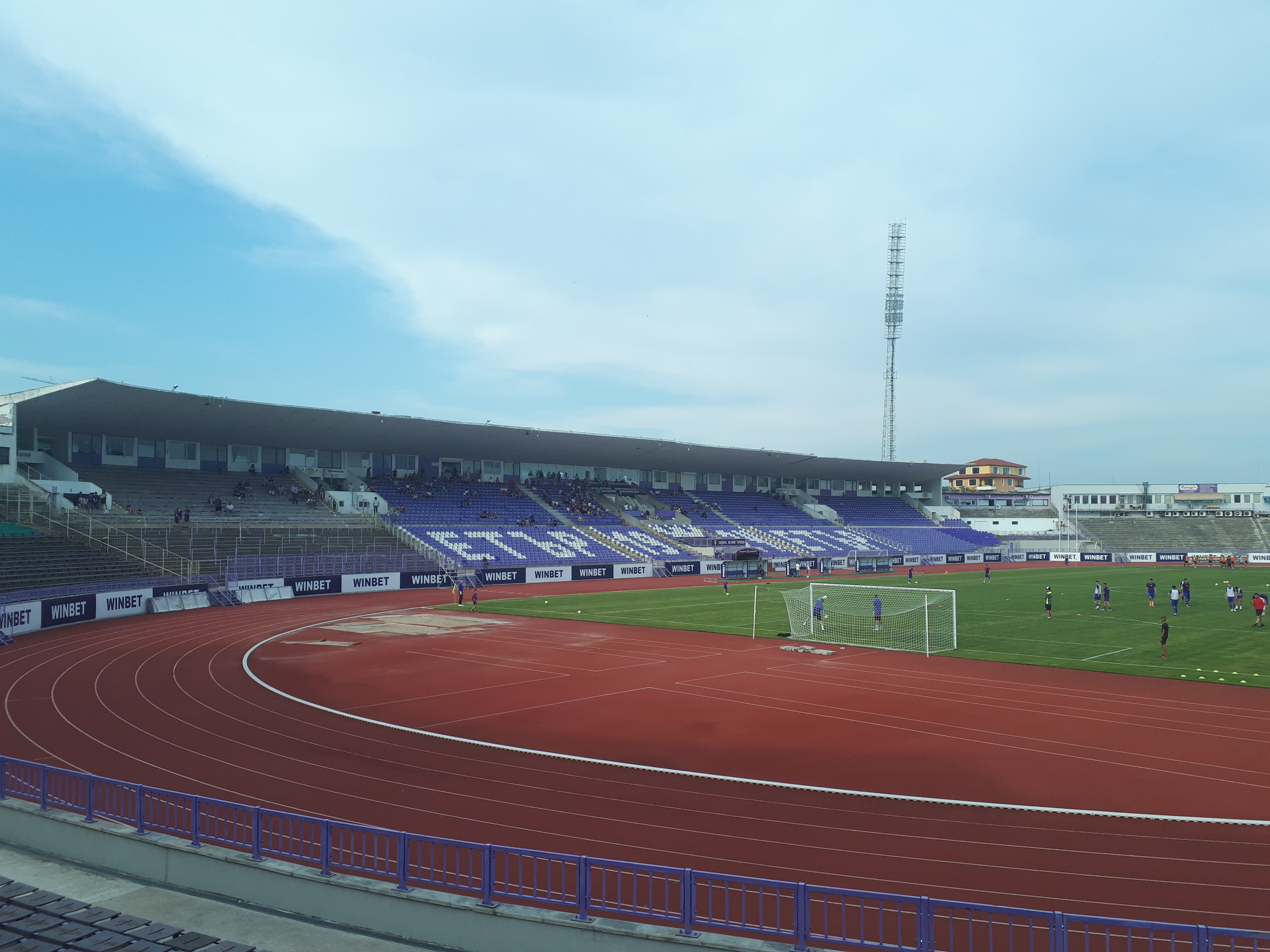
- Event: 1990–91 Bulgarian Cup
Levski Sofia	Botev Plovdiv
A Group	A Group
2	1
- Date: 29 May 1991
- Venue: Ivaylo Stadium, Veliko Tarnovo
- Referee: Stefan Chakarov (Veliko Tarnovo)
- Attendance: 10,000

The 1991 Bulgarian Cup final was played at the Ivaylo Stadium in Veliko Tarnovo on 29 May 1991, and was contested between the sides of Levski Sofia and Botev Plovdiv. The match was won by Levski Sofia.

== Match ==
=== Details ===
29 May 1991
18:00 EEST

Levski Sofia	2–1	Botev Plovdiv
Donkov 57'; Borimirov 80'		Yosifov 69'

Ivaylo Stadium, Veliko Tarnovo
Attendance: 10,000
Referee: Stefan Chakarov (Veliko Tarnovo)

Levski	Botev

Levski:
GK	1	(Bulgaria) Dimitar Popov
DF	2	(Bulgaria) Plamen Nikolov
DF	3	(Bulgaria) Petar Hubchev
MF	4	(Bulgaria) Daniel Borimirov
DF	5	(Bulgaria) Kiril Vangelov
DF	6	(Bulgaria) Georgi Slavchev
FW	7	(Bulgaria) Georgi Donkov
MF	8	(Bulgaria) Stanimir Stoilov (substituted off) 86'
FW	9	(Bulgaria) Petar Mihtarski
MF	10	(Bulgaria) Vladko Shalamanov
FW	11	(Bulgaria) Velko Yotov (substituted off) 89'
Substitutes:
MF	14	(Bulgaria) Iliya Gruev (substituted in) 86'
MF	15	(Bulgaria) Ivaylo Panchev (substituted in) 89'
Manager:
(Bulgaria) Vasil Metodiev

Botev:
GK	1	(Bulgaria) Hristo Tenev
DF	2	(Bulgaria) Trifon Pachev
DF	3	(Bulgaria) Slavcho Horozov
DF	4	(Bulgaria) Ivan Kochev
DF	5	(Bulgaria) Ivan Dobrevski
MF	6	(Bulgaria) Yasen Petrov
FW	7	(Bulgaria) Kostadin Kostadinov
MF	8	(Bulgaria) Todor Zaytsev (substituted off) 66'
FW	9	(Bulgaria) Boris Hvoynev
MF	10	(Bulgaria) Petar Zehtinski (substituted off) 84'
MF	11	(Bulgaria) Geno Dobrevski
Substitutes:
FW	15	(Bulgaria) Ognyan Yosifov (substituted in) 66'
MF	16	(Bulgaria) Atanas Pashev (substituted in) 84'
Manager:
(Bulgaria) Dinko Dermendzhiev

== See also ==
- 1990–91 A Group
