= 1990 Soviet Army Cup final =

1990 Cup of the Soviet Army final
CSKA Sofia	Botev Plovdiv
A Group	A Group
2	1
- Date: 5 June 1990
- Venue: Ovcha Kupel Stadium, Sofia
- Referee: Dimitar Dimitrov (Sofia)
- Attendance: 5,000

The 1990 Cup of the Soviet Army final was the 8th and last final of the Cup of the Soviet Army (as a secondary cup tournament in Bulgaria), and was contested between CSKA Sofia and Botev Plovdiv on 5 June 1990 at Ovcha Kupel Stadium in Sofia. CSKA won the final 2–1.

== Match ==
=== Details ===
5 June 1990

CSKA Sofia	2−1	Botev Plovdiv
Kostadinov 65'; Ivanov 77'		Dermendzhiev 6'

Ovcha Kupel Stadium, Sofia
Attendance: 5,000
Referee: Dimitar Dimitrov (Sofia)

CSKA	Botev

GK	1	(Bulgaria) Iliya Valov
DF	2	(Bulgaria) Emil Dimitrov
DF	3	(Bulgaria) Trifon Ivanov
DF	4	(Bulgaria) Stefan Bachev
DF	5	(Bulgaria) Dimitar Mladenov
MF	6	(Bulgaria) Kostadin Yanchev
FW	7	(Bulgaria) Emil Kostadinov
FW	8	(Bulgaria) Hristo Stoichkov
FW	9	(Bulgaria) Georgi Georgiev
MF	10	(Bulgaria) Marin Bakalov	(substituted off) 85'
MF	11	(Bulgaria) Slavcho Iliev
Substitutes:
DF	--	(Bulgaria) Marius Urukov	(substituted in) 85'
Manager:
(Bulgaria) Dimitar Penev

GK	1	(Bulgaria) Vladimir Chernev
DF	2	(Bulgaria) Trifon Pachev
DF	3	(Bulgaria) Mihail Strakov
DF	4	(Bulgaria) Ivan Kochev
DF	5	(Bulgaria) Zapryan Rakov
MF	6	(Bulgaria) Hristo Koilov	(substituted off) 90'
MF	7	(Bulgaria) Tsvetozar Dermendzhiev
MF	8	(Bulgaria) Todor Zaytsev
FW	9	(Bulgaria) Antim Pehlivanov
MF	10	(Bulgaria) Petar Zehtinski
FW	11	(Bulgaria) Boris Hvoynev	(substituted off) 53'
Substitutes:
MF	--	(Bulgaria) Ilko Topalov	(substituted in) 53'
FW	--	(Bulgaria) Petar Kartev	(substituted in) 90'
Manager:
(Bulgaria) Dinko Dermendzhiev
