= 1984 Bulgarian Cup final =

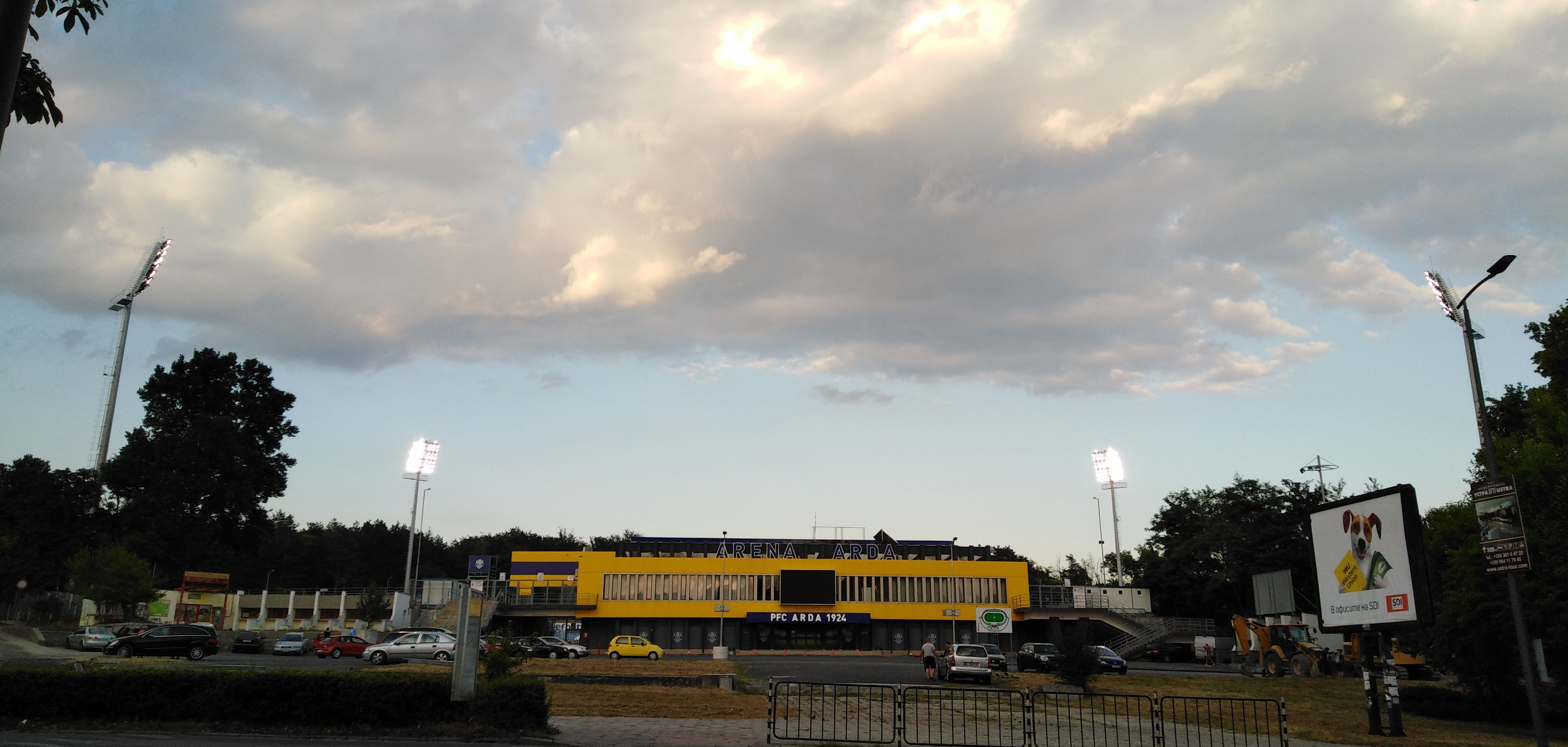
- Event: 1983–84 Bulgarian Cup
Levski Sofia	Botev Plovdiv
1	0
- Date: 2 May 1984
- Venue: Druzhba Stadium, Kardzhali
- Referee: Kiril Savov (Varna)
- Attendance: 30,000

The 1984 Bulgarian Cup final was the 44th final of the Bulgarian Cup, and was contested between Levski Sofia and Botev Plovdiv on 2 May 1984 at Druzhba Stadium in Kardzhali. Levski won the final 1–0.

== Match ==
=== Details ===
2 May 1984
17:00 EEST

Levski Sofia	1−0	Botev Plovdiv
Spasov 80' (pen.)

Druzhba Stadium, Kardzhali
Attendance: 30,000
Referee: Kiril Savov (Varna)

Levski	Botev

GK	1	(Bulgaria) Borislav Mihaylov
DF	2	(Bulgaria) Plamen Nikolov (c)
DF	3	(Bulgaria) Krasimir Koev
DF	4	(Bulgaria) Petar Petrov
DF	5	(Bulgaria) Nikolay Iliev
MF	6	(Bulgaria) Krasimir Chavdarov
MF	7	(Bulgaria) Rusi Gochev
MF	8	(Bulgaria) Plamen Tsvetkov	(substituted off) 63'
MF	11	(Bulgaria) Bozhidar Iskrenov	(substituted off) 82'
FW	9	(Bulgaria) Mihail Valchev
FW	10	(Bulgaria) Emil Spasov
Substitutes:
MF	--	(Bulgaria) Emil Velev	(substituted in) 63'
FW	--	(Bulgaria) Petar Kurdov	(substituted in) 82'
Manager:
(Bulgaria) Vasil Metodiev

GK	1	(Bulgaria) Dimitar Vichev
DF	2	(Bulgaria) Rumen Yurukov
DF	3	(Bulgaria) Dimitar Mladenov
DF	4	(Bulgaria) Blagoy Blangev
DF	5	(Bulgaria) Slavcho Horozov
DF	9	(Bulgaria) Trifon Pachev	(substituted off) 78'
MF	6	(Bulgaria) Marin Bakalov
MF	8	(Bulgaria) Vasil Simov
MF	10	(Bulgaria) Petar Zehtinski (c)
FW	7	(Bulgaria) Kostadin Kostadinov	(substituted off) 72'
FW	11	(Bulgaria) Atanas Pashev
Substitutes:
FW	--	(Bulgaria) Ivaylo Stoynov	(substituted in) 72'
FW	--	(Bulgaria) Aleksandar Nikolov	(substituted in) 78'
Manager:
(Bulgaria) Dinko Dermendzhiev

== See also ==
- 1983–84 A Group
