= Nikola Shterev - Starika Sports Complex =

Football complex in Bulgaria

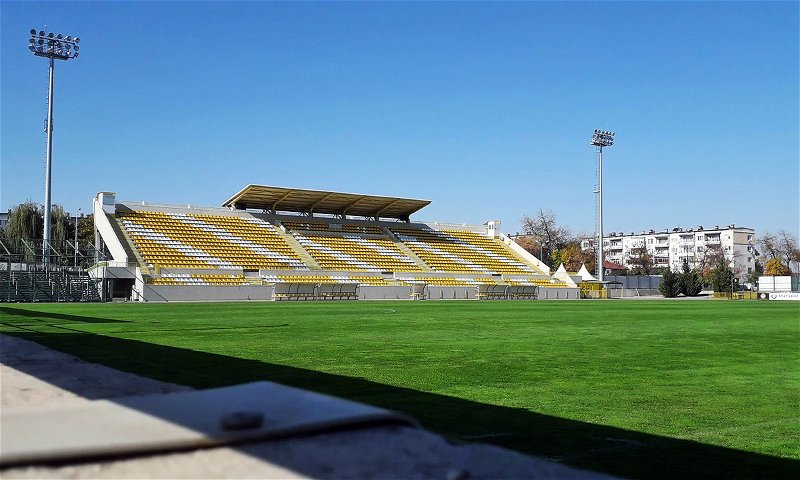
- The venue's main stand
- Interactive map of Nikola Shterev - Starika Sports Complex
- Former names: Botev 1912 Football Complex (2013–2023)
- Location: Plovdiv, Bulgaria
- Coordinates: 42°06′27″N 24°42′28.8″E
- Operator: PFC Botev Plovdiv
- Capacity: 3,000
- Surface: Grass, Artificial turf
- Field size: 105 m × 68 m

Construction
- Groundbreaking: 13 June 2012
- Built: 2012–2013
- Opened: 18 September 2013
- Renovated: 2016
- Cost: 13.3 million BGN €6.8 million in 2013
- Architect: Georgi Savov

Tenants
- Botev Plovdiv (2013–2023); Botev Plovdiv II (2021–present); Krumovgrad (2023–present)

Nikola Shterev - Starika Sports Complex (Bulgarian: Спортен комплекс „Никола Щерев - Старика“, romanized: Sporten Kompleks Nikola Shterev - Starika) or simply Starika is a football complex in Komatevo, Plovdiv, Bulgaria. It serves as the training grounds of Botev Plovdiv and as a home to its reserve team and youth academy.

For nearly ten years, from late 2013 to April 2023, the first team used the venue for training sessions and official matches, while their stadium, the Hristo Botev Stadium, was being reconstructed.

== Overview ==
The venue has a total of six fields, two of which have an artificial turf surface, the first one is standard size and the other is 40 by 50 metres (130 ft × 160 ft) long. The surface of the remaining four terrains is made from grass. Three of them are standard size, the last one being 90 by 50 metres (300 ft × 160 ft) long. A stand with a seating capacity of 1,998 spectators is situated next to one of the fields. The stand consists of two levels. The first one contains two built-in changing rooms, a gym, training rooms, referee rooms, a storage room, a doctor's office, a massage room and a press conferences room. The second level contains a fanshop and a cafeteria. The venue also consists of a hotel part.

In July 2023, the venue's name was changed to Nikola Shterev - Starika Sports Complex, in honor of Botev's legend - Nikola Shterev.

== Renovations ==
=== 2016 ===
In order to meet the licensing criteria of the Bulgarian Football Union, the club bought four floodlight pylons, which were then situated around the official field.

== Tenants ==
In 2017, the football complex was leased to Maritsa Plovdiv, until their stadium was licensed for professional football matches. In 2023, Krumovgrad announced they will play their home games on the venue during the 2023-24 season, as their stadium didn't cover Bulgarian First League standards.
