= 1984–85 A Group =

41st season of season of top-tier football league in Bulgaria

A Group
- Season: 1984–85
- Champions: Levski Sofia (16th title)
- Relegated: Minyor, Chernomorets
- European Cup: Trakia Plovdiv
- UEFA Cup: Lokomotiv Sofia; Pirin
- Matches: 240
- Goals: 744 (3.1 per match)
- Top goalscorer: Plamen Getov (26 goals)

The 1984–85 A Group was the 37th season of the A Football Group, the top Bulgarian professional league for association football clubs, since its establishment in 1948.

== Overview ==
It was contested by 16 teams, and Levski Sofia won the championship.

== League standings ==
Pos	Team	Pld	W	D	0–0	L	GF	GA	GD	Pts	Qualification or relegation
1	Levski Sofia (Note: Levski and CSKA are excluded from European competitions by Bulgarian Football Union for one season because a scandals during 1985 Bulgarian Cup final.) (C)	30	18	4	2	6	66	37	+29	40	
2	CSKA Sofia	30	15	6	1	8	66	36	+30	36	
3	Trakia Plovdiv	30	15	3	2	10	68	32	+36	33	Qualification for European Cup first round
4	Lokomotiv Sofia	30	13	7	1	9	45	41	+4	33	Qualification for UEFA Cup first round
5	Pirin Blagoevgrad	30	12	7	0	11	42	43	−1	31	Qualification for UEFA Cup first round
6	Botev Vratsa	30	13	3	0	14	48	42	+6	29	
7	Slavia Sofia	30	14	1	1	14	49	48	+1	29	
8	Etar Veliko Tarnovo	30	14	0	1	15	49	50	−1	28	
9	Spartak Pleven	30	11	5	2	12	47	52	−5	27	
10	Cherno More Varna	30	11	4	3	12	41	45	−4	26	
11	Sliven	30	11	4	1	14	41	45	−4	26	
12	Beroe Stara Zagora	30	11	4	1	14	41	51	−10	26	
13	Dunav Ruse	30	10	6	1	13	39	51	−12	26	
14	Spartak Varna	30	11	4	0	15	35	49	−14	26	
15	Minyor Pernik (R)	30	11	3	2	14	32	65	−33	25	Relegation to 1985–86 B Group
16	Chernomorets Burgas (R)	30	8	5	0	17	35	57	−22	21	Relegation to 1985–86 B Group

Source: 1984-85 Football retro-football.bg
Rules for classification: 1) points; 2) goal difference; 3) number of goals scored.
(C) Champion; (R) Relegated

== Results ==
Home \ Away	BSZ	BVR	CHM	CHB	CSK	DUN	ETA	LEV	LSO	MIN	PIR	SLA	SLI	SPL	SPV	TRA
Beroe Stara Zagora		0–2	3–0	4–0	0–3	2–0	0–0	3–0	3–0	0–2	1–1	2–1	2–0	2–1	2–0	1–0
Botev Vratsa	2–1		2–0	2–0	3–0	3–0	1–0	1–1	1–1	8–1	1–2	4–1	2–0	4–3	1–1	0–2
Cherno More	5–0	1–0		2–1	1–2	3–4	2–0	2–2	2–0	4–1	4–1	0–0	0–0	1–0	1–0	0–0
Chernomorets Burgas	1–0	1–0	1–1		0–2	3–2	3–1	0–1	1–2	5–1	3–0	1–2	3–2	0–1	0–1	1–0
CSKA Sofia	3–1	6–0	4–0	3–0		0–3	2–0	0–1	2–0	8–1	4–1	2–1	2–2	2–2	5–1	0–1
Dunav Ruse	2–1	1–0	2–2	1–1	1–4		1–2	1–2	1–1	1–0	1–0	2–1	2–1	4–2	1–2	1–1
Etar Veliko Tarnovo	2–0	4–1	1–2	3–2	3–1	4–1		0–3	1–0	3–0	3–0	2–1	2–0	5–2	1–0	1–0
Levski Sofia	7–2	2–0	3–2	3–1	3–1	0–0	4–2		3–1	2–3	0–1	1–2	4–1	3–2	2–1	3–1
Lokomotiv Sofia	2–2	3–1	1–1	3–1	1–0	3–0	5–2	0–5		2–2	3–1	2–3	1–0	2–1	2–0	1–2
Minyor Pernik	1–1	1–0	2–1	3–1	1–3	0–4	2–1	0–0	0–1		1–0	2–0	2–1	1–1	1–0	3–2
Pirin Blagoevgrad	1–1	2–0	1–0	1–1	2–2	1–1	2–0	1–1	1–0	3–1		3–2	4–2	7–1	1–0	1–0
Slavia Sofia	1–2	3–2	3–1	4–1	2–2	4–1	2–1	2–4	1–2	2–0	2–0		2–0	1–0	2–0	1–0
Sliven	5–2	1–0	0–2	1–1	1–1	2–0	3–2	1–0	2–2	1–0	2–0	2–0		2–0	5–2	2–1
Spartak Pleven	3–1	2–0	5–0	1–1	0–0	1–1	2–1	2–1	1–3	0–0	2–1	2–1	1–0		3–1	4–3
Spartak Varna	2–1	1–4	1–0	2–1	1–1	1–0	4–1	2–3	1–1	2–0	3–3	2–1	1–0	3–1		0–2
Trakia Plovdiv	4–1	1–3	5–1	8–0	3–1	4–0	4–1	2–2	0–0	8–0	1–0	5–1	4–2	1–1	3–0	

Source: A PFG (in Bulgarian)
Legend: Blue = home team win; Yellow = draw; Red = away team win.

== Champions ==
Levski Sofia

Goalkeepers
(Bulgaria) Borislav Mihaylov	29	(0)
(Bulgaria) Vlado Delchev	1	(0)

Defenders
(Bulgaria) Antoni Zdravkov	13	(0)
(Bulgaria) Nikolay Iliev	29	(4)
(Bulgaria) Krasimir Koev	15	(0)
(Bulgaria) Plamen Nikolov	22	(1)
(Bulgaria) Veselin Balevski	10	(0)
(Bulgaria) Stoil Georgiev	8	(0)
(Bulgaria) Kalin Bankov	3	(0)
(Bulgaria) Petar Petrov	29	(5)

Midfielders
(Bulgaria) Emil Velev	23	(3)
(Bulgaria) Krasimir Chavdarov	19	(3)
(Bulgaria) Nikolay Todorov	12	(1)
(Bulgaria) Plamen Tsvetkov	20	(4)
(Bulgaria) Bozhidar Iskrenov	13	(3)
(Bulgaria) Rusi Gochev	24	(8)

Forwards
(Bulgaria) Emil Spasov	23	(6)
(Bulgaria) Nasko Sirakov	19	(14)
(Bulgaria) Miroslav Baychev	14	(2)
(Bulgaria) Mihail Valchev	23	(10)
(Bulgaria) Petar Kurdov	9	(1)
(Bulgaria) Milko Galabov	1	(0)
(Bulgaria) Myumyun Kashmer	7	(1)

Manager
(Bulgaria) Vasil Metodiev

== Top scorers ==
Rank	Scorer	Club	Goals
1	(Bulgaria) Plamen Getov	Spartak Pleven	26
2	(Bulgaria) Atanas Pashev	Trakia Plovdiv	17
3	(Bulgaria) Antim Pehlivanov	Trakia Plovdiv	16
3	(Bulgaria) Mitko Argirov	Etar Veliko Tarnovo	16
5	(Bulgaria) Nikola Spasov	Cherno More	15
6	(Bulgaria) Tenko Dobrev	Sliven	14
6	(Bulgaria) Nasko Sirakov	Levski Sofia	14
8	(Bulgaria) Zhivko Gospodinov	Spartak Varna	13
8	(Bulgaria) Vercho Mitov	Minyor Pernik	13
8	(Bulgaria) Plamen Markov	CSKA Sofia	13
8	(Bulgaria) Emil Marinov	Botev Vratsa	13

== Attendances ==
#	Club	Average
1	Trakia	13,100
2	Dunav	12,200
3	Pleven	12,067
4	Levski	11,267
5	Pirin	11,133
6	Minyor	9,533
7	Etar	9,400
8	CSKA Sofia	8,643
9	Slavia Sofia	7,967
10	Lokomotiv Sofia	7,833
11	Sliven	7,565
12	Botev	7,107
13	Beroe	7,000
14	Chernomorets	7,000
15	Varna	6,933
16	Cherno More	5,787
