= Krasimir Koev =

Bulgarian footballer

Personal information
- Full name: Krasimir Aleksandrov Koev
- Date of birth: 27 August 1963 (age 63)
- Place of birth: Sofia, Bulgaria
- Position: Defender

Senior career*
Years	Team	Apps	(Gls)
1981–1990	Levski Sofia	189	(1)
1990–1991	Hapoel Tel Aviv	5	(0)
1991	Slavia Sofia	4	(0)
1991–1993	Levski Sofia	24	(0)
1994	Lokomotiv Plovdiv	13	(0)
1994–1995	Dorostol Silistra	27	(2)
1996–1997	Cherno More	35	(0)
1998	Septemvri Sofia	15	(2)
Total		312	(5)

International career
1983–1986	Bulgaria	15	(0)
- * Club domestic league appearances and goals

Krasimir Koev (Bulgarian: Красимир Коев; born 27 August 1963) is a former Bulgarian footballer who played as a defender. He spent the most of his career at Levski Sofia, winning several domestic trophies. Koev was capped 15 times at senior level for Bulgaria.

== Honours ==
=== Club ===
Levski Sofia

- Bulgarian A Group (4): 1983–84, 1984–85, 1987–88, 1992–93
- Bulgarian Cup (4): 1981–82, 1983–84, 1985–86, 1991–92
