= 1944 Bulgarian State Football Championship =

Bulgarian State Football Championship
- Season: 1944
- Champions: None

The 1944 Bulgarian State Football Championship was the final edition of the competition, as it was later replaced by the Republic Championship.

== Overview ==
This edition of the competition was contested by 26 teams. The championship was not finished. Besides teams from the present borders of Bulgaria, the 1944 season was the last season to involve teams from the areas under Bulgarian administration during much of World War II. Football clubs from Skopje in Vardar Macedonia and Kavala in Greek Macedonia took part in the competition.

== First round ==
Team 1	Agg.	Team 2	1st leg	2nd leg
Shipchenski sokol Varna	1–0	ZhSK Varna	1–0	1–0
Orel-Chegan 30 Vratsa	6–7^{1}	Knyaz Simeon Tarnovski Pavlikeni	3–3	3–4
ZhSK Plovdiv	5–3	PFC Botev Plovdiv	3–1	2–2
Botev Yambol	8–3^{2}	ZhSK Stara Zagora	5–1	3–2
Slavia Dupnitsa	8–6	Makedonska slava Gorna Dzhumaya	4–2	4–4
Levski Dobrich	5–1	Vihar Silistra	2–1	3–0
Momchil yunak Kavala	4–1^{3}	Bulgaria Haskovo	1–1	3–0 (w/o)
Levski Sofia	5–3	Slavia Sofia	4–3	1–0
Benkovski Sofia	10–2	AS 23 Sofia	3–1	7–1
Han Kubrat Popovo	bye			
Dobrudzha Ruse	bye			
Etar Veliko Tarnovo	bye			
SP 39 Pleven	bye			
Viktoria 23 Vidin	bye			
Makedonia Skopie	bye			
ZhSK Skopie	bye			
Levski Burgas	bye			

- ^{1}Orel-Chegan 30 Vratsa were originally qualified to the second round because Knyaz Simeon Tarnovski Pavlikeni were withdraw from the competition, but they were also withdraw.
- ^{2}ZhSK Stara Zagora were qualified to the second round because Botev Yambol were withdraw from the competition.
- ^{3}Bulgaria Haskovo were qualified to the second round because Momchil yunak Kavala were withdraw from the competition.

== Second round ==
Team 1	Agg.	Team 2	1st leg	2nd leg
Viktoria 23 Vidin	2–12	Levski Sofia	2–9	0–3 (w/o)
Benkovski Sofia	9–0	Slavia Dupnitsa	6–0	3–0
SP 39 Pleven	5–3	Etar Veliko Tarnovo	3–0	2–3
Makedonia Skopie	?–?	ZhSK Skopie	0–1	?–?
ZhSK Plovdiv	?–?	Bulgaria Haskovo	4–3	?–?
ZhSK Stara Zagora	0–5	Levski Burgas	0–2	0–3 (w/o)
Levski Dobrich	3–3^{1}	Shipchenski sokol Varna	2–1	1–2
Dobrudzha Ruse	0–8	Han Kubrat Popovo	0–5	0–3

- ^{1}Shipchenski sokol Varna were qualified to the quarter-finals because Levski Dobrich were rejected participation in the replay match.

== Quarter-finals ==
Team 1	Agg.	Team 2	1st leg	2nd leg
Benkovski Sofia	cancelled	Han Kubrat Popovo	–	–
Shipchenski sokol Varna	cancelled	Levski Sofia	–	–
Levski Burgas	cancelled	Bulgaria Haskovo	–	–
SP 39 Pleven	cancelled	Makedonia Skopie	–	–
