= Edson Silva (footballer, born 2001) =

Bissau-Guinean footballer

Personal information
- Full name: Edson Martinho Silva
- Date of birth: 17 May 2001 (age 25)
- Place of birth: Portugal
- Height: 1.92 m (6 ft 4 in)
- Position: Midfielder

Team information
- Current team: Spartak Varna (on loan from Botev Plovdiv)
- Number: 16

Youth career
- 2016–2017: Vitória de Setúbal
- 2017–2018: Gil Vicente

Senior career*
Years	Team	Apps	(Gls)
2018–2019	Alcochetense	5	(0)
2019–2023	Sporting CP B	8	(0)
2023–2024	Nea Salamis Famagusta	6	(0)
2024	→ Olympiakos Nicosia (loan)	8	(0)
2024–2025	Enosis Neon Paralimni	27	(0)
2026–	Botev Plovdiv	17	(1)
2026–	→ Spartak Varna (loan)	0	(0)

International career^{‡}
2023–	Guinea-Bissau	3	(0)
- * Club domestic league appearances and goals as of 8 September 2026 ‡ National team caps and goals as of 27 August 2025

Edson Martinho Silva (born 27 May 2001) is a professional footballer who plays as a defensive midfielder for Bulgarian First League club Spartak Varna, on loan from Botev Plovdiv. Born in Portugal, he plays for the Guinea-Bissau national team.

== Club career ==
Silva is a product of the youth academies of the Portuguese clubs Vitória de Setúbal and Gil Vicente. He made his senior debut with Alcochetense in 2018, and in 2019 transferred to Sporting CP on a 3-year contract where he played for their B-team.

On 31 January 2023, Edson moved to the Cypriot Second Division club Nea Salamis Famagusta. On 1 February 2024, he joined Olympiakos Nicosia on loan. On 8 August 2024, he transferred to Enosis Neon Paralimni in the Cypriot First Division.

== International career ==
Silva debuted with the Guinea-Bissau national team for a 2023 Africa Cup of Nations qualification match in a 2–1 win over Sierra Leone on 15 September 2023.
