= Georgi Popov =

Bulgarian footballer (1944–2024)

Personal information
- Full name: Georgi Dimitrov Popov
- Date of birth: 14 July 1944
- Place of birth: Plovdiv, Bulgaria
- Date of death: 9 March 2024 (aged 79)
- Height: 1.70 m (5 ft 7 in)
- Position: Winger

Youth career
- Maritsa Plovdiv

Senior career*
Years	Team	Apps	(Gls)
1961–1975	Botev Plovdiv	308	(83)

International career
1963-1970	Bulgaria	22	(0)

Managerial career
- 1996–1997: Botev Plovdiv
- 2011–: Maritsa Plovdiv
- * Club domestic league appearances and goals

Georgi Dimitrov Popov (Bulgarian: Георги Димитров Попов; 14 July 1944 – 9 March 2024) was a Bulgarian football forward who played for Bulgaria in the 1970 FIFA World Cup. At club level, he spent 14 years of his career as a player at Botev Plovdiv.

== Career ==
Born in Plovdiv, Popov began his career with local club Maritsa Plovdiv. In 1961, as a schoolboy, he joined Botev Plovdiv. With Botev, he won one A PFG title, one Bulgarian Cup and one Balkans Cup. Popov earned 308 appearances in the league, scoring 83 goals. In the Bulgarian Cup, he played 50 matches and scored 15 goals.

Popov died on 9 March 2024, at the age of 79.

== Honours ==
Botev Plovdiv

- A Group: 1966–67
- Bulgarian Cup: 1961–62
- Balkans Cup: 1972
