= 1929 Bulgarian State Football Championship =

Bulgarian State Football Championship
- Season: 1929
- Champions: Botev Plovdiv

The 1929 Bulgarian State Football Championship was the sixth edition of the Bulgarian State Football Championship. It consisted of ten teams, and it was won by Botev Plovdiv, who defeated Levski Sofia 1–0 in the final.

This was the first and last final played by Botev, while it was Levski's second appearance, following their first one in 1925.

== Qualified teams ==
The winners from each OSO (Bulgarian: окръжна спортна област, lit. 'regional sports district') qualify for the State championship.

OSO	Team
Varnenska OSO	Shipchenski sokol Varna
Shumenska OSO	Han Omurtag Shumen
Rusenska OSO	Rakovski Ruse
Tarnovska OSO	Chardafon Gabrovo
Plevenska OSO	Levski Pleven
Vrachanska OSO	no representative
Bdinska OSO	Maria Luisa Lom
Sofiyska OSO	Levski Sofia
Rilska OSO	no representative
Plovdivska OSO	Botev Plovdiv
Haskovska OSO	no representative
Starozagorska OSO	Trayana Stara Zagora
Primorska OSO	Levski Burgas

== First round ==
Team 1	Score	Team 2
Shipchenski sokol Varna	5–0	Han Omurtag Shumen
Rakovski Ruse	3–2	Chardafon Gabrovo
Levski Pleven	2–0	Maria Luisa Lom
Levski Burgas	3–1	Trayana Stara Zagora
Levski Sofia	bye	
Botev Plovdiv	bye	

== Quarter-finals ==
Team 1	Score	Team 2
Shipchenski sokol Varna	2–0	Rakovski Ruse
Levski Sofia	2–0	Levski Pleven
Botev Plovdiv	3–1	Levski Burgas

== Semi-finals ==
Team 1	Score	Team 2
Botev Plovdiv	3–1	Shipchenski sokol Varna
Levski Sofia	bye	

== Final ==
3 October 1929

Slavia Sofia	0–1	Botev Plovdiv
		Shterev 81'

Sofia
