= Zapryan Rakov =

Bulgarian footballer

Personal information
- Full name: Zapryan Ivanov Rakov
- Date of birth: 4 January 1962 (age 64)
- Place of birth: Manole, Bulgaria
- Height: 1.81 m (5 ft 11 1/2 in)
- Position: Centre-back

Senior career*
Years	Team	Apps	(Gls)
1983–1993	Botev Plovdiv	321	(7)
1993–1994	Spartak Plovdiv	43	(7)
1995	Botev Plovdiv	14	(1)
1995–1996	Maritsa Plovdiv	41	(3)
1997	Olimpik Teteven	15	(1)
1997–1999	Botev Plovdiv	24	(0)

International career
1989–1994	Bulgaria	27	(0)
- * Club domestic league appearances and goals

Zapryan Ivanov Rakov (Bulgarian: Запрян Иванов Раков) (born 4 January 1962, in Manole) is a former Bulgarian international football player.
