= Ivan Sotirov =

Bulgarian footballer (1935–2025)

Personal information
- Date of birth: 14 March 1935
- Place of birth: Plovdiv, Bulgaria
- Date of death: 24 April 2025 (aged 90)
- Place of death: Bulgaria
- Position: Forward

Senior career*
Years	Team	Apps	(Gls)
1954–1955	Spartak Plovdiv	17	(4)
1955–1965	Botev Plovdiv	228	(86)
- * Club domestic league appearances and goals

Ivan Sotirov (Bulgarian: Иван Сотиров; 14 March 1935 – 24 April 2025) was a Bulgarian footballer who played as a forward.

== Career ==
Sotirov began his career at Spartak Plovdiv, where he played one season, before joining Botev Plovdiv. Between 1955 and 1965 Sotirov played 228 matches for Botev, scoring 86 goals. He was the A Group top scorer in the 1960–61 season with 20 goals.

== Death ==
Sotirov died in Bulgaria on 24 April 2025, at the age of 90.

== Honours ==
Botev Plovdiv

- Bulgarian Cup: 1962
