= Ivan Kochev =

Bulgarian volleyball player

Personal information
- Full name: Ivan Petrov Kochev
- Nationality: Bulgarian
- Born: 8 July 1939 (age 87)
- Height: 183 cm (6 ft 0 in)

Volleyball information
- Number: 2

Ivan Kochev (Bulgarian: Иван Кочев, born 8 July 1939) is a Bulgarian former volleyball player. He competed in the men's tournament at the 1964 Summer Olympics.
