= Dimitar Mladenov =

Bulgarian footballer

Personal information
- Date of birth: 12 March 1962 (age 64)
- Place of birth: Plovdiv, Bulgaria
- Height: 1.81 m (5 ft 11 1/2 in)
- Position: Defender

Senior career*
Years	Team	Apps	(Gls)
1979–1989	Botev Plovdiv	227	(2)
1989–1991	CSKA Sofia	57	(1)
1991–1994	Botev Plovdiv	71	(1)
1995	Lokomotiv GO	15	(1)
1995	Haskovo	17	(1)
1996	Maritsa Plovdiv	19	(2)
1996–1997	Botev Plovdiv	18	(0)

International career
1983–1992	Bulgaria	9	(0)
- * Club domestic league appearances and goals

Dimitar Mladenov (Bulgarian: Димитър Младенов; born 12 March 1962) is a Bulgarian former professional footballer who played as a defender.
