= Petar Kurdov =

Bulgarian footballer and manager

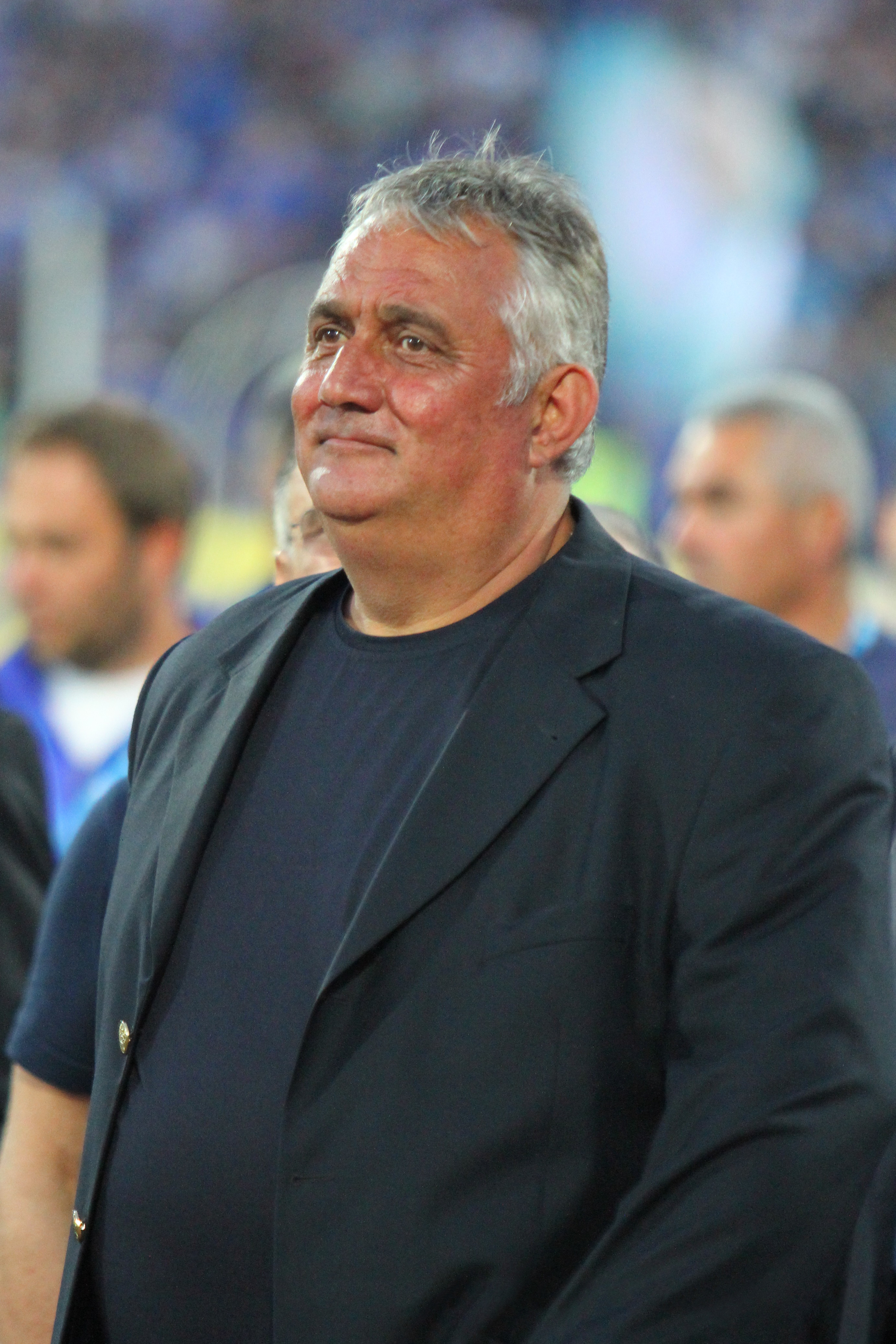

Personal information
- Full name: Petar Atanasov Kurdov
- Date of birth: 13 March 1961 (age 65)
- Place of birth: Plovdiv, Bulgaria
- Height: 1.82 m (6 ft 0 in)
- Position: Forward

Senior career*
| Years | Team | Apps | (Gls) |
| 1977–1980 | Maritsa Plovdiv | 23 | (9) |
| 1980–1986 | Levski Sofia | 96 | (23) |
| 1986–1987 | Botev Plovdiv | 23 | (12) |
| 1987–1988 | Levski Sofia | 24 | (14) |
| 1988–1989 | Mainz 05 | 18 | (2) |
| 1989–1990 | Lokomotiv Sofia | 11 | (3) |
| 1990 | Mallorca | 7 | (1) |
| 1990–1991 | Yantra Gabrovo | 10 | (5) |
| 1991–1992 | Slavia Sofia | 1 | (0) |

International career
| 1981 | Bulgaria | 1 | (0) |

Managerial career
- Maritsa Plovdiv
- Belasitsa Petrich
- 2001: Botev Plovdiv
- 2004: Spartak Varna
- * Club domestic league appearances and goals

Petar Kurdov (Bulgarian: Петър Курдов; born 13 March 1961) is a Bulgarian football player and manager. His son is a football player named Atanas Kurdov.

== Career ==
A forward, Kurdov played for the Bulgarian team of Levski Sofia and during that time he made his debut with the national team while also having his best seasons. After that he was part of two experiences abroad at Mainz 05 and Mallorca.

Kurdov made one appearance for the Bulgaria national team in 1981.

== Honours ==
Levski Sofia

- Bulgarian Championship: 1983–84, 1984–85, 1987–88
- Bulgarian Cup: 1981–82, 1983–84
- Cup of the Soviet Army: 1983–84, 1987–88
