= Geno Dobrevski =

Bulgarian footballer (born 1970)

Personal information
- Full name: Geno Valkov Dobrevski
- Date of birth: 12 May 1970 (age 56)
- Place of birth: Plovdiv, Bulgaria
- Position: Forward

Senior career*
| Years | Team | Apps | (Gls) |
| 1989–1994 | Botev Plovdiv | 94 | (25) |
| 1994–1995 | Spartak Plovdiv | 25 | (8) |
| 1995–1996 | Slavia Sofia | 13 | (1) |
| 1996–1997 | Botev Plovdiv | 54 | (17) |
| 1997–1998 | Paços de Ferreira | 12 | (0) |
| 1998–2000 | Botev Plovdiv | 44 | (9) |
| Total | | 242 | (60) |

International career
| | Bulgaria | 2 | (0) |
- * Club domestic league appearances and goals

Geno Valkov Dobrevski (Bulgarian: Гено Вълков Добревски; born 12 May 1970) is a former Bulgarian footballer who played as a forward.

== Career ==
Dobrevski played for most of his career with Botev Plovdiv, earning championship bronze medals with the team in 1993 and 1994. During the autumn of 1995, he was part of the Slavia Sofia team, which won the A PFG at the end of the season. In 1998, Dobrevski had a short spell in Portugal with Paços de Ferreira.

Dobrevski has a twin brother, Ivan Dobrevski, who also plied his trade as a footballer. Following their retirement, the two brothers have become involved in business, representing the Portuguese brand Murati. They own shoe stores in Sofia, Plovdiv and Varna.
