= Kostadin Vidolov =

Bulgarian footballer

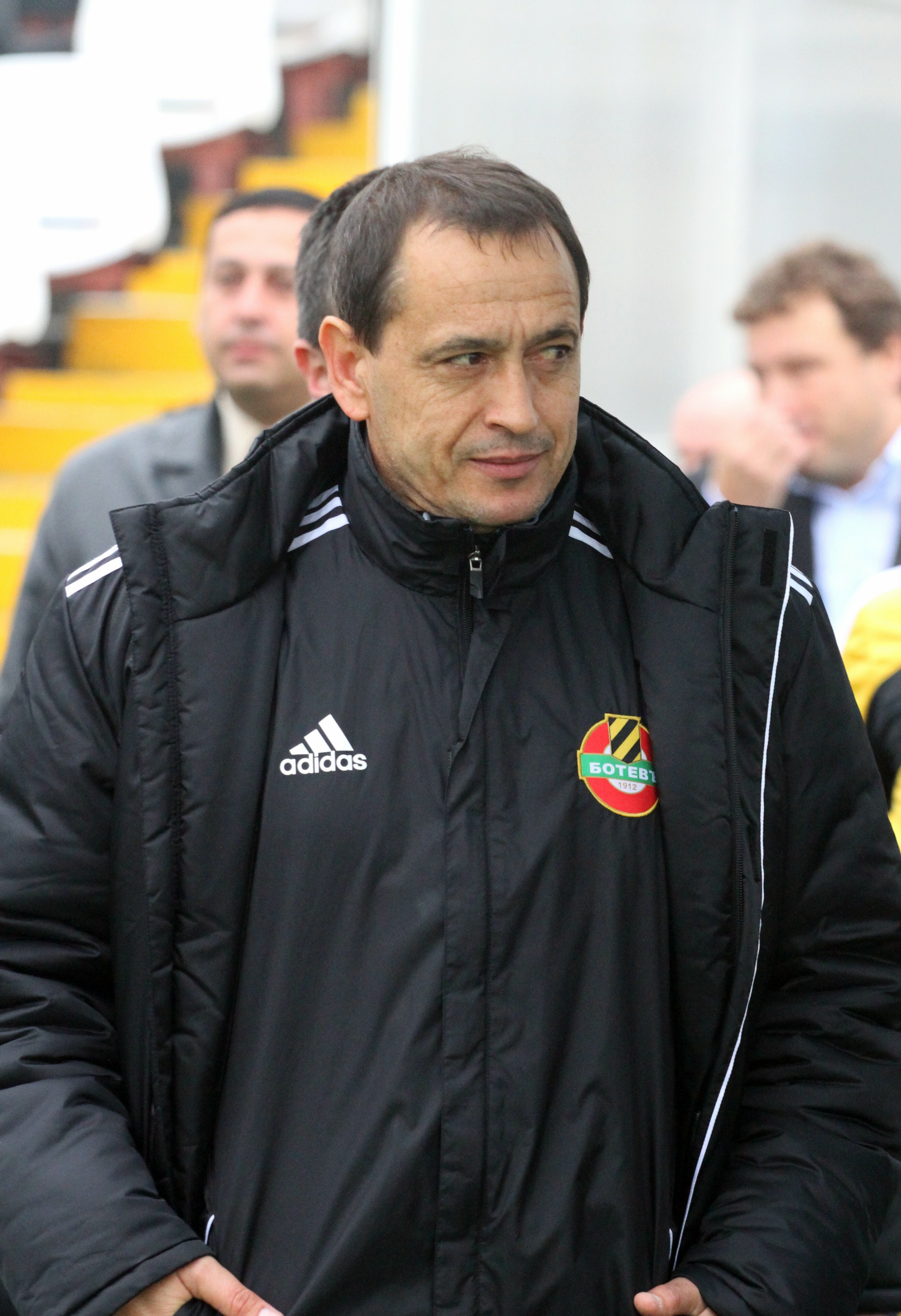

Personal information
- Full name: Kostadin Todorov Vidolov
- Date of birth: 2 May 1970 (age 56)
- Place of birth: Plovdiv, Bulgaria
- Height: 1.75 m (5 ft 9 in)
- Position: Midfielder

Youth career
- 1980–1988: Maritsa Plovdiv

Senior career*
| Years | Team | Apps | (Gls) |
| 1989–1993 | Lokomotiv Plovdiv | 112 | (23) |
| 1993–1996 | Botev Plovdiv | 76 | (19) |
| 1996 | CSKA Sofia | 15 | (1) |
| 1997–1999 | Bursaspor | 77 | (5) |
| 1999–2000 | Botev Plovdiv | 23 | (7) |
| 2000–2001 | CSKA Sofia | 20 | (8) |
| 2001–2003 | Union Berlin | 73 | (17) |
| 2004 | Levski Sofia | 11 | (1) |
| 2004–2007 | Botev Plovdiv | 82 | (25) |
| 2007 | Spartak Plovdiv | 11 | (0) |
| 2008–2010 | Beroe Stara Zagora | 42 | (6) |
| Total | | 542 | (111) |

International career
| 1992–1997 | Bulgaria | 9 | (1) |
- * Club domestic league appearances and goals

Kostadin Todorov Vidolov (Bulgarian: Костадин Тодоров Видолов; born 2 May 1970) is a Bulgarian former professional footballer who played as a midfielder. In his career, he played for Lokomotiv Plovdiv, Botev Plovdiv, CSKA Sofia, Levski Sofia, Spartak Plovdiv, Beroe Stara Zagora, German 1. FC Union Berlin and Turkish Bursaspor.

For the Bulgarian national team Vidolov was capped 9 times, scoring one goal. He ended his career in the middle of the 2009–10 season.

== Career ==
Vidolov was born in Plovdiv and started his youth career in the popular local team Maritsa. A young prospect, he transferred to the more popular Lokomotiv Plovdiv in 1989. Vidolov made more than 100 appearances, scoring 23 goals for Lokomotiv. He had established himself as the playmaker in the side.

In June 1993 he transferred Botev – the side that he supported as a kid. For the "canaries" Vidolov played until 1996, making 76 appearances and scoring 19 goals. He was called in the Bulgaria national football team while playing for Botev and was considered likely to be selected for the 1994 World Cup, but eventually did not make the final squad. In the autumn of 1995 Vidolov scored a hat-trick in the derby game against Lokomotiv Plovdiv. He also scored the winning goal for the 0–1 win over FC Dinamo Tbilisi and played well in the games against Sevilla FC in UEFA Europa League, which was then called UEFA Cup. Vidolov was sold to CSKA Sofia in the autumn of 1996, after Botev started to experience financial troubles.

In January 1997 Kostadin signed with the Turkish club Bursaspor for a fee of €1,000,000. There he made 77 appearances, scoring 5 goals. In 1999 Vidolov was signed by Botev as an amateur; the club could not afford to pay Bursaspor the fee for a transfer, and Vidolov was not wanted in Bursa anymore. He made excellent performances for Botev during the 1999–00 season. Vidolov signed with CSKA Sofia in the summer of 2000, taking an instrumental part in their 2000–01 run for the championship title. In 2001 Vidolov signed with the Berlin club – 1. FC Union. Vidolov played two seasons for the German club, with whom he qualified for the final of DFB-Pokal, before moving back to Bulgaria.

Vidolov returned in Bulgaria for the 2003–04 season, playing for Levski Sofia. He managed to win his first Bulgarian Cup with them in 2004. Vidolov signed a contract with Botev Plovdiv in 2004 in trying to help the struggling team to return to the top-flight. He played for three seasons with Botev Plovdiv – a disagreement between him and the club owner Dimitar Hristolov drove Vidolov out in the summer of 2007. Vidolov moved to second-flight Spartak Plovdiv, where he played for the first half of the 2007–08 season. As such Vidolov became the only player to have ever played for all four major clubs of Plovdiv.

In January 2008, the veteran signed with Beroe Stara Zagora, in an attempt to save the team from relegation. On 2 November 2009, Vidolov played his last match in career, against Sliven for A PFG. In January 2010, he was announced as an assistant coach of Beroe's second team. Vidolov has also been employed as an assistant manager of Botev Plovdiv.

=== International goals ===
Scores and results list Bulgaria's goal tally first.

| # | Date | Venue | Opponent | Score | Result | Competition |
|---|---|---|---|---|---|---|
| 1. | 20 February 1993 | Dubai, United Arab Emirates | United Arab Emirates | 2–0 | 3–1 | Friendly match |
