= 1980–81 Bulgarian Cup =

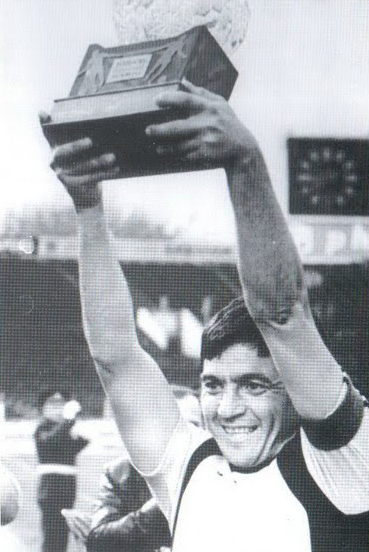
- Botev's captain Zehtinski with the cup

Tournament details
- Country: Bulgaria

Final positions
- Champions: Botev Plovdiv (2nd cup)
- Runners-up: Pirin Blagoevgrad

Tournament statistics
- Top goal scorer(s): Hristo Denchev (Pirin) (6 goals)

The 1980–81 Bulgarian Cup was the 41st season of the Bulgarian Cup (in this period the tournament was named Cup of the Soviet Army). Botev Plovdiv won the competition, beating Pirin Blagoevgrad 1–0 in the final at the Vasil Levski National Stadium.

== First round ==
| Team 1 | Score | Team 2 |
19 November 1980
| Ludogorets Razgrad | 4–1 | Chumerna Elena |
| Marek Dupnitsa | 2–0 | Kaliakra Kavarna |
| Maritsa Plovdiv | 2–0 | Slivnishki Geroy |
| Lokomotiv Plovdiv | 4–0 | Lokomotiv Ruse |
| Devnya | 1–0 | Vihren Sandanski |
| Dobrudzha Dobrich | 1–3 (a.e.t.) | Chavdar Troyan |
| Minyor Radnevo | 1–1 (a.e.t.) (5–3 p) | Minyor Pernik |
| CSKA Sofia | 8–0 | Botev Kozloduy |
| Belasitsa Petrich | 4–0 | Avtostroitel Shumen |
| Cherno More Varna | 4–1 | Gorubso Madan |
| Beroe Stara Zagora | 5–0 | Spartak Pleven |
| Dorostol Silistra | 0–1 | Botev Plovdiv |
| Yantra Gabrovo | 3–0 | Chirpan |
| Lokomotiv GO | 3–4 (a.e.t.) | Velbazhd Kyustendil |
| Spartak Varna | 3–0 | Rodopa Smolyan |
| Akademik Sofia | 4–0 | Botev Vratsa |
| Svetkavitsa | 0–3 | Levski Sofia |
| Haskovo | 3–0 | Levski Lyaskovets |
| Litex Lovech | 2–0 | Balkan Belogradchik |
| Lokomotiv Mezdra | 3–4 | Etar Veliko Tarnovo |
| Lokomotiv Burgas | 1–0 | Hebar Pazardzhik |
| Minyor Rudozem | 3–1 | Bdin Vidin |
| Minyor Buhovo | 2–0 | Botev Ihtiman |
| Asenovets Asenovgrad | 1–0 (a.e.t.) | Chepinets Velingrad |
| Pavlikeni | 2–0 | Montana |
| Akademik Svishtov | 3–1 | Nesebar |
| Dimitrovgrad | 1–0 | Shumen |
| Chernolomets Popovo | 2–1 | Benkovski Isperih |
| Lokomotiv Sofia | 3–1 | Rozova Dolina |
| Pirin Blagoevgrad | 3–0 | Dunav Ruse |
| Slavia Sofia | 2–1 | Tundzha Yambol |
| Metalurg Pernik | 3–2 | Chernomorets Burgas |

== Second round ==
| Team 1 | Score | Team 2 |
10, 11 and 25 December 1980
| Yantra Gabrovo | 2–1 | Haskovo |
| Beroe Stara Zagora | 2–0 | Velbazhd Kyustendil |
| Minyor Buhovo | 2–1 | Lokomotiv Plovdiv |
| Metalurg Pernik | 1–3 | Pirin Blagoevgrad |
| Asenovets Asenovgrad | 1–0 | Etar Veliko Tarnovo |
| Spartak Varna | 2–0 | Lokomotiv Sofia |
| Ludogorets Razgrad | 1–2 (a.e.t.) | Cherno More Varna |
| Marek Dupnitsa | 1–0 | Devnya |
| Minyor Radnevo | 1–2 | Chavdar Troyan |
| Belasitsa Petrich | 2–2 (a.e.t.) (4–3 p) | Slavia Sofia |
| Pavlikeni | 3–0 | Litex Lovech |
| Chernolomets Popovo | 1–1 (a.e.t.) (2–4 p) | Maritsa Plovdiv |
| Akademik Sofia | 2–4 (a.e.t.) | Levski Sofia |
| Minyor Rudozem | 1–5 | CSKA Sofia |
| Botev Plovdiv | 2–0 | Akademik Svishtov |
| Lokomotiv Burgas | 0–0 (a.e.t.) (5–4 p) | Dimitrovgrad |

== Third round ==
| Team 1 | Score | Team 2 |
15 February–4 March 1981
| Spartak Varna | 2–1 | CSKA Sofia |
| Minyor Buhovo | 2–0 | Levski Sofia |
| Lokomotiv Burgas | 0–2 (a.e.t.) | Botev Plovdiv |
| Pirin Blagoevgrad | 4–0 | Beroe Stara Zagora |
| Belasitsa Petrich | 1–0 | Chavdar Troyan |
| Asenovets Asenovgrad | 3–0 | Maritsa Plovdiv |
| Pavlikeni | 0–1 | Yantra Gabrovo |
| Marek Dupnitsa | 1–0 | Cherno More Varna |

== Quarter-finals ==
| Team 1 | Score | Team 2 |
11–18 March 1981
| Botev Plovdiv | 4–1 | Minyor Buhovo |
| Marek Dupnitsa | 1–1 (a.e.t.) (3–5 p) | Pirin Blagoevgrad |
| Asenovets Asenovgrad | 0–0 (a.e.t.) (3–4 p) | Belasitsa Petrich |
| Spartak Varna | 1–0 | Yantra Gabrovo |

== Semi-finals ==
| Team 1 | Score | Team 2 |
22 April 1981
| Pirin Blagoevgrad | 2–0 | Spartak Varna |
| Botev Plovdiv | 6–0 | Belasitsa Petrich |

== Final ==
=== Details ===
5 May 1981

| Botev Plovdiv | 1−0 | Pirin Blagoevgrad |
|---|---|---|
| Argirov 43' |

Vasil Levski National Stadium, Sofia
Attendance: 20,000
Referee: Yordan Zhezhov (Sofia)

| Botev | Pirin |
