= Nikola Shterev =

Bulgarian footballer

Personal information
- Date of birth: 13 March 1903
- Place of birth: Plovdiv, Bulgaria
- Date of death: 27 December 1972 (aged 69)
- Position: Forward

Senior career*
Years	Team	Apps	(Gls)
1916–1917	FC Bay Ganyo	–	(–)
1917–1933	Botev Plovdiv	114	(68)

International career
1926	Bulgaria	1	(0)

Managerial career
- 1924–1933: Botev Plovdiv
- 1945: Botev Plovdiv
- * Club domestic league appearances and goals

Nikola Shterev (Bulgarian: Никола Щерев) (born 13 March 1903 – 27 December 1972) was a Bulgarian international football player and coach. On club level Shterev won one national championship with Botev Plovdiv in 1929.

In July 2023, Botev Plovdiv's Komatevo Stadium name was changed to Nikola Shterev - Starika Sports Complex in honor of Shterev.

== Career ==
Shterev started his career at the age of 13 in the little Sport Club Bay Ganyo. In 1917 he relocated to Botev Plovdiv. From 1924 Shterev was a captain and coach of the team.

Shterev retired in 1933 to take up the role of director of the Football school in Plovdiv, a post that he held until his death in 1972. From 1933 to 1945 he also was a football referee.
