= 1961–62 Bulgarian Cup =

Tournament details
- Country: Bulgaria

Final positions
- Champions: Botev Plovdiv (1st cup)
- Runners-up: Dunav Ruse

Tournament statistics
- Top goal scorer(s): Ivan Kolev (CSKA) (6 goals)

The 1961–62 Bulgarian Cup was the 22nd season of the Bulgarian Cup (in this period the tournament was named Cup of the Soviet Army). Botev Plovdiv won the competition, beating Dunav Ruse 3–0 in the final at the Vasil Levski National Stadium.

== First round ==
Team 1	Agg.	Team 2	1st leg	2nd leg
CSKA Sofia	13–0	Petar Bonev Perushtitsa	13–0	0–0
Lokomotiv Plovdiv	2–3	Dobrudzha Dobrich	1–0	1–3
Dimitrovgrad	2–4	Slavia Sofia	1–1	1–3
Levski Karlovo	2–5	Botev Plovdiv	1–1	1–4
Spartak Pleven	1–0	Akademik Svishtov	1–0	0–0
Shumen	0–6	Cherno More Varna	0–1	0–5
Botev Vratsa	3–2	Lokomotiv Sofia	2–0	1–2
Spartak Sofia	1–1 (4–3 p)	Rozova Dolina	1–1	0–0
Spartak Plovdiv	8–3	Tundzha Yambol	7–0	1–3
Minyor Kyustendil	1–8	Minyor Pernik	1–3	0–5
Arda Kardzhali	5–8	Beroe Stara Zagora	3–4	2–4
Raketa Gabrovnitsa	1–5	Bdin Vidin	0–1	1–4
Belasitsa Petrich	1–7	Marek Dupnitsa	1–2	0–5
Spartak Varna	5–0	Dorostol Silistra	1–0	4–0
Yantra Gabrovo	2–6	Levski Sofia	2–4	0–2
DTK Parvi May Varna	0–3	Dunav Ruse	0–2	0–1

== Second round ==
Team 1	Agg.	Team 2	1st leg	2nd leg
Beroe Stara Zagora	2–1	Spartak Varna	1–0	1–1
Minyor Pernik	4–5	Spartak Plovdiv	4–2	0–3
Bdin Vidin	0–1	Levski Sofia	0–1	0–0
Botev Plovdiv	3–1	Spartak Pleven	2–0	1–1
Slavia Sofia	4–4 (4–5 p)	Marek Dupnitsa	3–1	1–3
Spartak Sofia	4–2	Dobrudzha Dobrich	2–1	2–1
Dunav Ruse	4–2	Botev Vratsa	3–0	1–2
Cherno More Varna	3–2	CSKA Sofia	3–0	0–2

== Quarter-finals ==
Team 1	Agg.	Team 2	1st leg	2nd leg
Levski Sofia	2–5	Spartak Plovdiv	2–0	0–5
Marek Dupnitsa	2–2 (4–5 p)	Beroe Stara Zagora	1–2	1–0
Cherno More Varna	1–2	Dunav Ruse	1–1	0–1
Botev Plovdiv	6–4	Spartak Sofia	3–2	3–2

== Semi-finals ==
Team 1	Agg.	Team 2	1st leg	2nd leg
Botev Plovdiv	5–2	Spartak Plovdiv	1–1	4–1
Beroe Stara Zagora	1–4	Dunav Ruse	1–1	0–3

== Final ==
=== Details ===
12 August 1962

Botev Plovdiv	3−0	Dunav Ruse
Dermendzhiev 33'; Haralampiev 53'; Chakarov 76'

Vasil Levski National Stadium, Sofia
Attendance: 20,000
Referee: Kostadin Dinov (Sofia)

Botev	Dunav
