= Boris Hvoynev =

Bulgarian footballer

Personal information
- Date of birth: 19 August 1967 (age 59)
- Place of birth: Smolyan, Bulgaria
- Position: Forward

Youth career
- 1977–1986: Botev Plovdiv

Senior career*
Years	Team	Apps	(Gls)
1986–1992	Botev Plovdiv	141	(31)
1992	CSKA Sofia	13	(4)
1993–1995	Botev Plovdiv	65	(28)
1995–1996	Lokomotiv Sofia	?	(?)
1996–1997	Botev Plovdiv	27	(9)
1997	Alki Larnaca	?	(?)
1998	Botev Plovdiv	12	(5)
1998–1999	Valletta	?	(?)
1999–2000	Botev Plovdiv	17	(4)

International career
1993–1995	Bulgaria	2	(0)
- * Club domestic league appearances and goals

Boris Hvoynev (Bulgarian: Борис Хвойнев; born 19 August 1967) is a former Bulgarian footballer who played as a forward. He spent more than a decade with Botev Plovdiv and appeared in over 200 matches in the Bulgarian top league. Hvoynev was capped two times at the senior level by the Bulgaria national team, making his debut on 10 January 1993, in the 0:3 loss against Tunisia in a friendly match.

== Career ==
Considered a Botev Plovdiv legend, where he spent the vast majority of his playing career, Hvoynev also represented Loko Sofia, CSKA Sofia and Maritsa Plovdiv. Outside of Bulgaria, he donned the shirt of Alki (Cyprus) and La Valletta (Malta), becoming champion with the latter. In 2005, Hvoynev relocated to Baltimore, United States, where he has been coaching youth teams.

== Honours ==
Valletta

- Maltese Premier League: 1998–99
