= Todor Zaytsev =

Bulgarian footballer

Personal information
- Full name: Todor Yakov Zaytsev
- Date of birth: 30 May 1967 (age 59)
- Place of birth: Plovdiv, Bulgaria
- Position: Attacking midfielder

Youth career
- 1977–1986: Botev Plovdiv

Senior career*
Years	Team	Apps	(Gls)
1987–1994	Botev Plovdiv	194	(42)
1995	Lokomotiv Plovdiv	17	(8)
1995–1997	Levski Sofia	49	(15)
1998	Botev Plovdiv	9	(4)
1998–2000	Floriana	44	(9)
2000–2002	Chernomorets Burgas	42	(3)

Managerial career
- 2009: Botev 2002 (private academy)
- 2011–: Botev Plovdiv (youth team)
- * Club domestic league appearances and goals

Todor Zaytsev (Bulgarian: Тодор Зайцев; born 30 May 1967) is a former Bulgarian footballer who played as a midfielder.

== Career ==
Zaytsev's career is mostly associated with Botev Plovdiv, though he also donned the shirt of city rivals Lokomotiv Plovdiv as well as Levski Sofia (becoming vice-champion of Bulgaria with the "bluemen") and Chernomorets Burgas. Between 1998 and 2000, he had a spell in Malta.
