= Antim Pehlivanov =

Bulgarian footballer

Personal information
- Full name: Antim Sabatinov Pehlivanov
- Date of birth: 7 June 1959 (age 67)
- Place of birth: Madan, Bulgaria
- Position: Forward

Senior career*
| Years | Team | Apps | (Gls) |
| 1977–1982 | Gorubso Madan | 72 | (43) |
| 1982–1990 | Botev Plovdiv | 164 | (89) |
| 1990 | APOP Paphos | ? | (?) |
| 1991 | Akritas Chlorakas | ? | (?) |
| 1991 | Ethnikos Achna | ? | (?) |

International career
| 1980–1984 | Bulgaria | 10 | (0) |
- * Club domestic league appearances and goals

Antim Pehlivanov (Bulgarian: Антим Пехливанов; born 7 June 1959) is a former Bulgarian footballer who played as a forward.
