= Kostadin Kostadinov (footballer) =

Bulgarian footballer (born 1959)

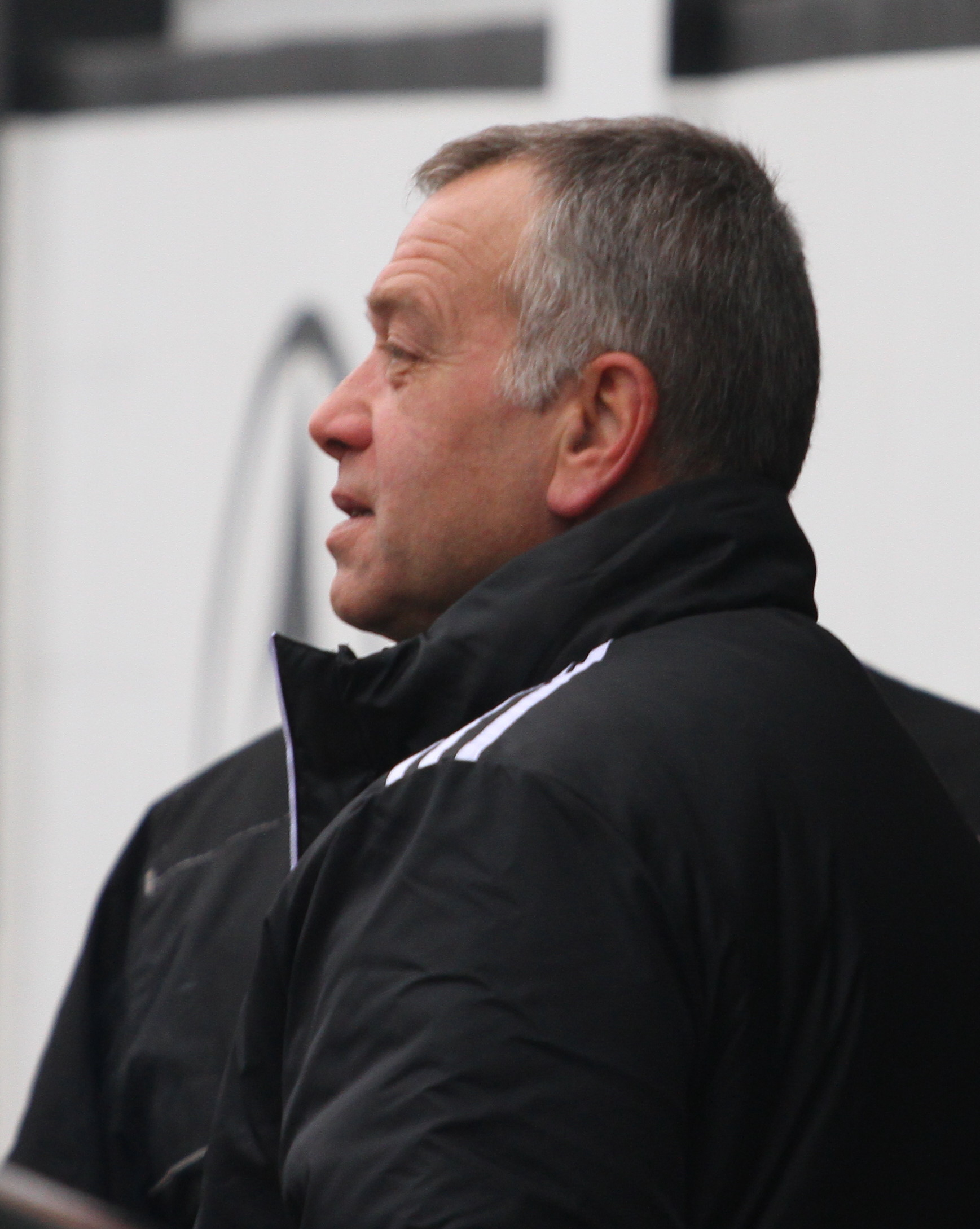

Personal information
- Full name: Kostadin Stefanov Kostadinov
- Date of birth: 25 June 1959 (age 67)
- Place of birth: Plovdiv, Bulgaria
- Height: 1.80 m (5 ft 11 in)
- Position: Winger

Senior career*
Years	Team	Apps	(Gls)
1975–1987	Botev Plovdiv	290	(94)
1987–1988	Braga	21	(2)
1988	Botev Plovdiv	11	(2)
1989–1990	Doxa Drama	12	(3)
1990–1992	Botev Plovdiv	48	(10)
Total		382	(111)

International career
1979–1986	Bulgaria	44	(8)

Managerial career
- 1992: Hebar Pazardzhik
- * Club domestic league appearances and goals

Kostadin Stefanov Kostadinov (Bulgarian: Костадин Стефанов Костадинов; born 25 June 1959) is a former Bulgarian footballer who played as a winger.

== Career ==
During his career, he played for Trakia Plovdiv in Bulgaria and made 350 appearances in the Bulgarian championship, scoring 106 goals. Kostadinov also played for the Bulgaria national football team (48 caps/10 goals) from 1979 to 1986.

He later coached PFC Hebar Pazardzhik.

== Honours ==
Botev Plovdiv

- Bulgarian Cup: 1980–81
