= Marin Bakalov =

Bulgarian footballer and coach

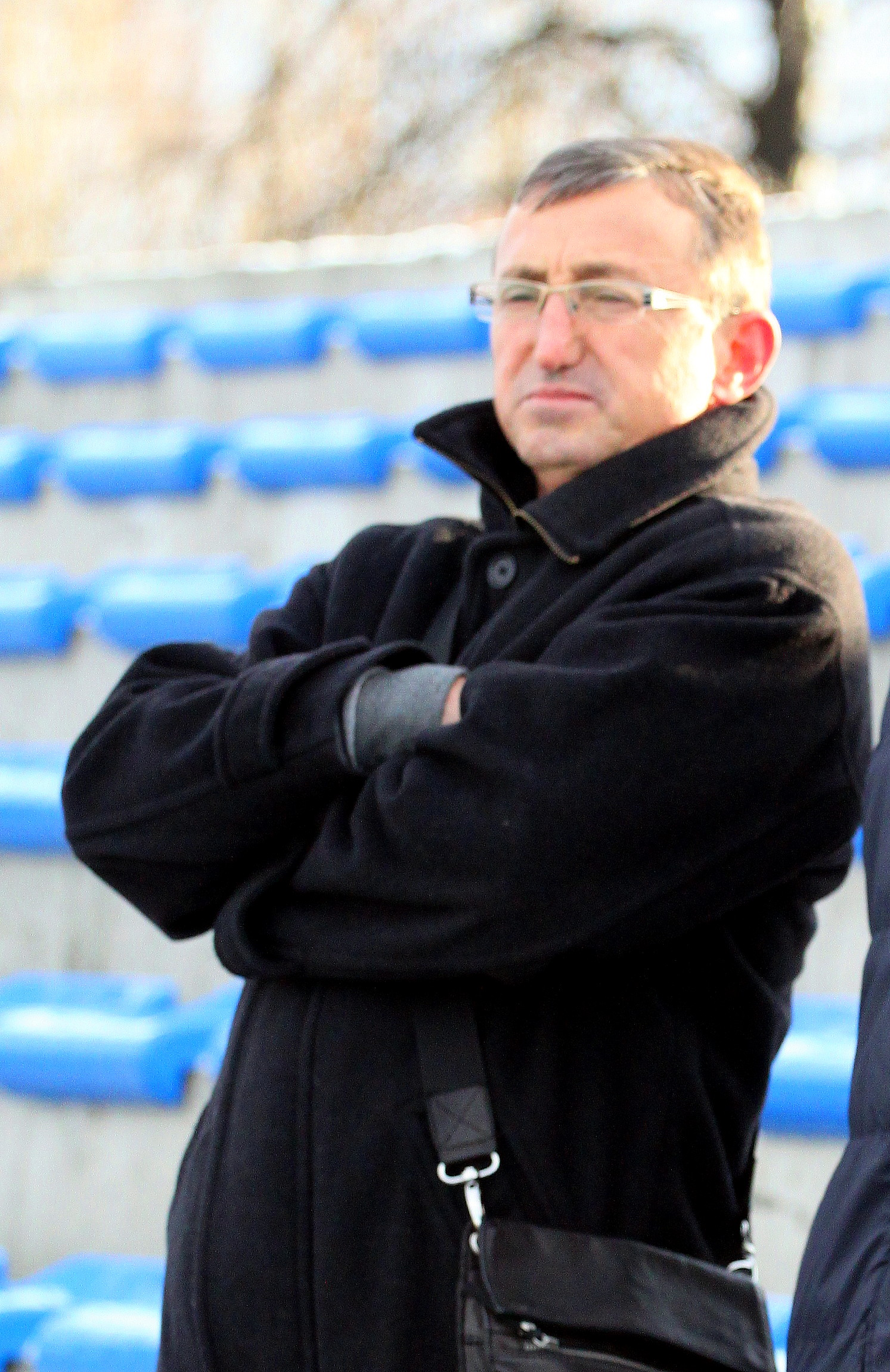

Personal information
- Full name: Marin Kirilov Bakalov
- Date of birth: 18 April 1962 (age 64)
- Place of birth: Asenovgrad, Bulgaria
- Positions: Centre back; midfielder

Senior career*
Years	Team	Apps	(Gls)
1980–1989	Botev Plovdiv	209	(35)
1989–1991	CSKA Sofia	46	(8)
1991–1992	Botev Plovdiv	27	(5)
1992–1993	Chaves	21	(2)
1993–1995	Botev Plovdiv	73	(12)
1995–1996	Spartak Plovdiv	26	(2)
1996	Maritsa Plovdiv	15	(0)
1997	Botev Plovdiv	14	(2)
1997	Olimpik Galata	14	(1)
1998–1999	Botev Plovdiv	30	(4)
Total		475	(71)

Managerial career
- 1998–1999: Botev Plovdiv (Assistant)
- 1999–2000: Botev Plovdiv
- 2001: Chernomorets Burgas
- 2002–2006: Botev 2002
- 2006–2007: Spartak Plovdiv
- 2010–2011: Botev Plovdiv
- * Club domestic league appearances and goals

Marin Bakalov (born 18 April 1962) is a Bulgarian football coach and former professional player.

== Career ==
=== Playing career ===
Bakalov made a total of 454 league appearances in Bulgaria for Botev Plovdiv, CSKA Sofia, Spartak Plovdiv, Maritsa Plovdiv and Olimpik Galata. He also played in Portugal for Chaves.

=== Management career ===
Bakalov has managed Botev Plovdiv, Chernomorets Burgas, Botev 2002, and Spartak Plovdiv.
