= Atanas Pashev =

Bulgarian footballer

Personal information
- Full name: Atanas Dimitrov Pashev
- Date of birth: 21 November 1963 (age 62)
- Place of birth: Pazardzhik, Bulgaria
- Position: Left winger

Senior career*
Years	Team	Apps	(Gls)
1980–1982	Hebar Pazardzhik	68	(12)
1982–1989	Botev Plovdiv	194	(100)
1989–1990	Beitar Jerusalem	19	(4)
1991	Hapoel Ramat Gan		
1991–1992	Hebar Pazardzhik		
1992–1993	Maritsa Plovdiv		
1993	Kuala Lumpur		
1995–1996	Lokomotiv Plovdiv	5	(0)
1997–1998	Belana Belovo	23	(11)

International career
1983–1985	Bulgaria U21	9	(5)
1984–1987	Bulgaria	15	(2)
- * Club domestic league appearances and goals

Atanas Dimitrov Pashev (Bulgarian: Атанас Димитров Пашев; born 21 November 1963) is a former Bulgarian football player who played as a left winger.

== Career ==
Born in Pazardzhik, Pashev played club football for most of his career with Trakia Plovdiv (now Botev Plovdiv), scoring 100 goals in 194 Bulgarian A PFG matches. He also once played with Kuala Lumpur FA in M-League in 1993. Pashev played in Beitar Jerusalem in the season of 1989-1990. He took part in 19 league games and scored 4 goals.

Pashev scored six goals in 36 appearances for the Bulgaria national football team and was a participant at the 1986 FIFA World Cup.
