= Petar Zehtinski =

Bulgarian footballer and manager

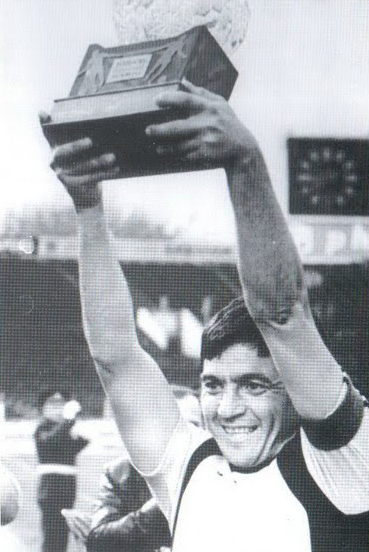

Personal information
- Full name: Petar Lyubenov Zehtinski
- Date of birth: 15 September 1955 (age 71)
- Place of birth: Plovdiv, Bulgaria
- Position: Midfielder

Senior career*
Years	Team	Apps	(Gls)
1974–1975	Arda Kardzhali	38	(0)
1975–1986	Botev Plovdiv	258	(29)
1986–1987	Omonia Nicosia	26	(7)
1986–1991	Botev Plovdiv	93	(10)
Total		415	(46)

International career
	Bulgaria U21	7	(2)
1981–1983	Bulgaria	6	(1)
	Bulgaria Olympic	5	(0)
- * Club domestic league appearances and goals

Petar Zehtinski (Bulgarian: Петър Зехтински; born 15 September 1955) is a former Bulgarian footballer and manager who played as a midfielder.

== Career ==
A skillful free kick taker and a talented passer, Zehtinski spent more than a decade with Botev Plovdiv, while also having two spells with Arda from Kardzhali and one season with Omonia Nicosia in Cyprus. On 7 November 1984, Zehtinski captained the "canaries" from Plovdiv in their 2:0 second leg victory over German powerhouse Bayern Munich in a 1/8 final of the European Cup Winners' Cup. Botev Plovdiv were eventually eliminated after an aggregate score of 3:4. His nickname is Zico. Between 1996 and 1998, he was assistant manager of CSKA Sofia and also had a short stint as head coach in 1998. Beyond his club-related pursuits, Zehtinski has served as assistant manager of Bulgaria.

== Honours ==
- Master of Sports - since 1981
- Best footballer of Plovdiv - 1983, 1984, 1989
