= Botev Plovdiv =

Bulgarian football club

- Full name: Професионален Футболен Клуб „Ботев“ АД; Profesionalen Futbolen Klub Botev AD (Botev Professional Football Club)
- Nicknames: Канарчетата (The Canaries); Жълто-черните (The Yellow-Blacks)
- Founded: 11 March 1912; 114 years ago (as Hristo Botyov – Football Association)
- Ground: Stadion Hristo Botev
- Capacity: 18,777
- Owner: Club 1912 (90%); Association PFK Botev (10%)
- Chairman: Vacant
- Head coach: Stanislav Genchev
- League: First League
- 2025–26: First League, 8th of 16
- Website: botevplovdiv.bg
Home colours	Away colours	Third colours

Botev Plovdiv (Bulgarian: Ботев Пловдив, pronounced [ˈbɔtɛf ˈpɫɔvdif]) is a Bulgarian professional football club based in Plovdiv, which competes in the Parva Liga, the top tier of Bulgarian football. Founded on 11 March 1912, it is the oldest active football club in Bulgaria and is widely regarded as one of the country’s historically significant clubs.

Named after Bulgarian poet and revolutionary Hristo Botev, the club plays its home matches at Hristo Botev Stadium in Plovdiv.

Botev has won two Bulgarian league titles, four Bulgarian Cups, one Bulgarian Supercup and one Balkans Cup. The club’s best performance in European competition came when it reached the quarter-finals of the Cup Winners’ Cup. Throughout its history, Botev has remained an important presence in Bulgarian football and one of the country’s traditionally best-supported clubs.

== History ==
=== Foundation and early development (1912–1944) ===
The club was founded on 11 March 1912 as Hristo Botyov - Futbolno druzhestvo (meaning "Hristo Botyov - Football Association") in Plovdiv by 22 students from Saint Augustine's French College and First Boys High School. The name was chosen in honor of the Bulgarian national hero Hristo Botev, as proposed by the club's host - Tenyo Rusev. The club's first management board also included Stoyan Puhtev, serving as chairman, Nenko Penelov as vice-chairman and Petar Delev as both a secretary and cashier. Interestingly, the Botev Plovdiv's constituent assembly was held on Sunday, March 11, 1912, and received a juridical registration on the next day, Monday, March 12. Presently club fans celebrate the later date as a birthday.

In 1920, some members of the association split and founded a new football club, named Rekord. However, this did not deter Botev from winning the first unofficial urban championship. On 30 August 1925, Botev lost 2–6 to Turkish side Fenerbahçe, in its first international match. The following year, the team led by the playing coach and captain – Nikola Shterev, won the Plovdiv Cup. In the years before the Bulgarian championship was created, the team regularly participated in the local Plovdiv championship, claiming it six times.

Botev won its first national title in 1929, defeating Levski Sofia 1–0 in the final, with Nikola Shterev scoring the winning goal. The club became the first from Plovdiv to win the Bulgarian Championship. Notable players from the period include Stancho Prodanov, Vangel Kaundzhiev and Mihail Kostov, who played for the national team. In the following two years as well as in 1937 and 1940, Botev won the urban championship.

=== Reorganisation and domestic success (1945–1989) ===
The club's name has been changed for political reasons several times: Botev (1912–1946), DNV (1947–1951), DNA (1952–1957), SKNA (1957), Botev (1957–1968) and Trakia (1968–1989). In 1951, Botev Plovdiv joined the newly created Bulgarian A PFG. Despite being relegated in 1953 to the Bulgarian B PFG, in 1954 the club easily won promotion for the top division. 1956 was very successful for the team, which finished 3rd in the domestic league and qualified for the final of the Bulgarian Cup, where Botev faced Levski Sofia. The final match was lost by the canaries with 2–5.

In the next few years, the local municipality decided to build a new venue for the sports club. The construction for the sports complex, started on July 21, 1959, and was built in a period of two years. The new stadium was named Hristo Botev, in honor of the national hero. The sport venue was inaugurated with a friendly match between Botev and Steaua București, which was won by the canaries with 3–0 in front of 20,000 spectators.

In 1961 Botev finished 3rd in the A PFG, for second time in the club's history. This championship also marked the first appearance of the club's most important player Dinko Dermendzhiev and the beginning of Botev's golden age. Dermendzhiev holds Botev's overall appearances record, playing in 447 matches for the club. Second is Viden Apostolov with 429 matches and third is Petar Zehtinski with 351. Botev's all-time leading scorer is also Dermendzhiev, who scored 194 goals at his period in the club. Kostadin Kostadinov is the Botev's second highest scorer with 106 goals and third is Atanas Pashev with 100 goals.

Under the leadership of Dinko Dermendzhiev, Botev won their first Bulgarian Cup in 1962, beating Dunav Rousse 3–0 at Vasil Levski National Stadium in Sofia on 12 August. In the 1962–63 season Botev reached the quarter-final of the Cup Winners' Cup by eliminating Steaua București and Shamrock Rovers before losing to Atlético Madrid 1–5 on aggregate. In the same season the team finished runners-up in A PFG with 40 points, only 3 less than the first, Spartak Plovdiv.

The club claimed its second national title in 1967. A few days later, political authorities merged two local clubs with Botev – Spartak and Akademik, creating Trakia. The "new" club, continued playing its games on Hristo Botev Stadium and kept its players, colours, history and fans. The reasoning behind the merger was creating a team which would gather the best players in the city and contend with Sofia-based teams. However, only two players from recent rivals Spartak had joined the team.

The championship team featured several notable players, such as Viden Apostolov, Georgi Popov and Rayko Stoynov, with Vasil Spasov as head coach. Botev represented Bulgaria in the 1967–68 European Champions Cup where they lost in the first round to Rapid București after 2–0 win in Plovdiv and 0–3 (a.e.t.) loss in Romania. A few years later, in 1981, the team became runners up of the Balkans Cup for the first time, playing against Yugoslavian Velež Mostar after two spectacular final matches to finish second

In 1981, the club's forward Georgi Slavkov won the club's highest individual achievement, the European Golden Shoe after finishing as Europe's top domestic scorer with 31 goals. The same year, the team won its second Bulgarian Cup, after a win against Pirin Blagoevgrad. This period was very successful for the club. Botev finished 3rd in the A PFG, in 1981, 1983, 1985, 1987, 1988 and 2nd in 1986. In this year the team finished with 41 points, only 2 less than the first, Beroe, in spite of the 8–1 win against Beroe in the direct match. Many of the club's most notable stars played around this time, such as Antim Pehlivanov, Dimitar Vichev, Atanas Pashev, Dimitar Mladenov, Zapryan Rakov, Blagoy Bangev and Petar Zehtinski were part of the rank and file of the notable Golden Team.

An important achievement of that period was the 1985 Cup Winners' Cup campaign, when Botev qualified for the second round of the tournament. The team secured a 2–0 victory against the German powerhouse Bayern Munich (with Klaus Augenthaler, Dieter Hoeneß, Søren Lerby, Lothar Matthäus and Jean-Marie Pfaff in their squad). On November 7, 1984, in front of more than 45,000 spectators at Plovdiv Stadium, Atanas Pashev and Kostadin Kostadinov scored for the win, but Botev were eliminated after losing 1–4 in the first-leg. Another memorable win is the 1–0 home victory over Barcelona in a Cup Winners' Cup first-leg in 1981. On 29 November 1989, after 22 years of playing under Trakia, the club restored its authentic name – Botev.

=== Post-communist transition and decline (1990–2010) ===
In 1992, the club was bought by a conglomerate of brokers led by Hristo Alexandrov and Hristo Danov. They brought in players with experience in Bulgarian football, such as Nasko Sirakov, Bozhidar Iskrenov, Kostadin Vidolov and Borislav Mihaylov. In this period, Botev signed the first foreign player in the club's history, the Hungarian Roberto Szabay. These big investments however did not bring any significant results and the club only reached third place in the A PFG in 1993, 1994 and 1995.

On 19 March 1999 Botev was acquired by Dimitar Hristolov. This day marked the beginning of difficult years for the club. In the 2000–01 season, the team was relegated to B PFG, after playing 47 years in the A PFG. Botev spent one season in the second division and quickly returned to the top flight, but in 2004 the club was relegated for the second time. From 2005 to 2009 the club played in the A PFG, but in the second part of the league table.

In September 2009, Botev Plovdiv set an unusual record after fielding seven Italian players in the 1–2 away loss against Litex Lovech, becoming the first A PFG club to feature that many foreigners from the same nationality.

On 24 February 2010, Botev Plovdiv were administratively relegated from A PFG due to financial difficulties. Botev's opponents were awarded 3–0 wins by default during the second half of the season.

=== Financial crisis, recovery and recent history (2010–present) ===
Following the financial collapse in 2010, Botev Plovdiv were relegated to the third level of Bulgarian football, the amateur V Group for the 2010–11 season. The club was completely rebuilt on an administrative level, several Bulgarian players with first league and international experience helped the team return to B Group, such as striker Atanas Kurdov, midfielder Todor Timonov, captain Nikolay Manchev, and goalkeeper Armen Ambartsumyan. The club went unbeaten and won their regional third league, and thus gained promotion to the second level of Bulgarian football.

A new coach was hired for the 2011–12 B Group season. Petar Houbchev, who had previous international experience both as a player and manager, succeeded Kostadin Vidolov. The lack of good results, however, saw Hubchev sacked from his position in October 2011. Botev Plovdiv then reached an agreement with a new head coach – Milen Radukanov, who didn't show good results either. Therefore, Kostadin Vidolov returned at the helm of the club and succeeded in gaining promotion to the first level of Bulgarian football, after a 2–0 win against Sportist Svoge in the play-offs.

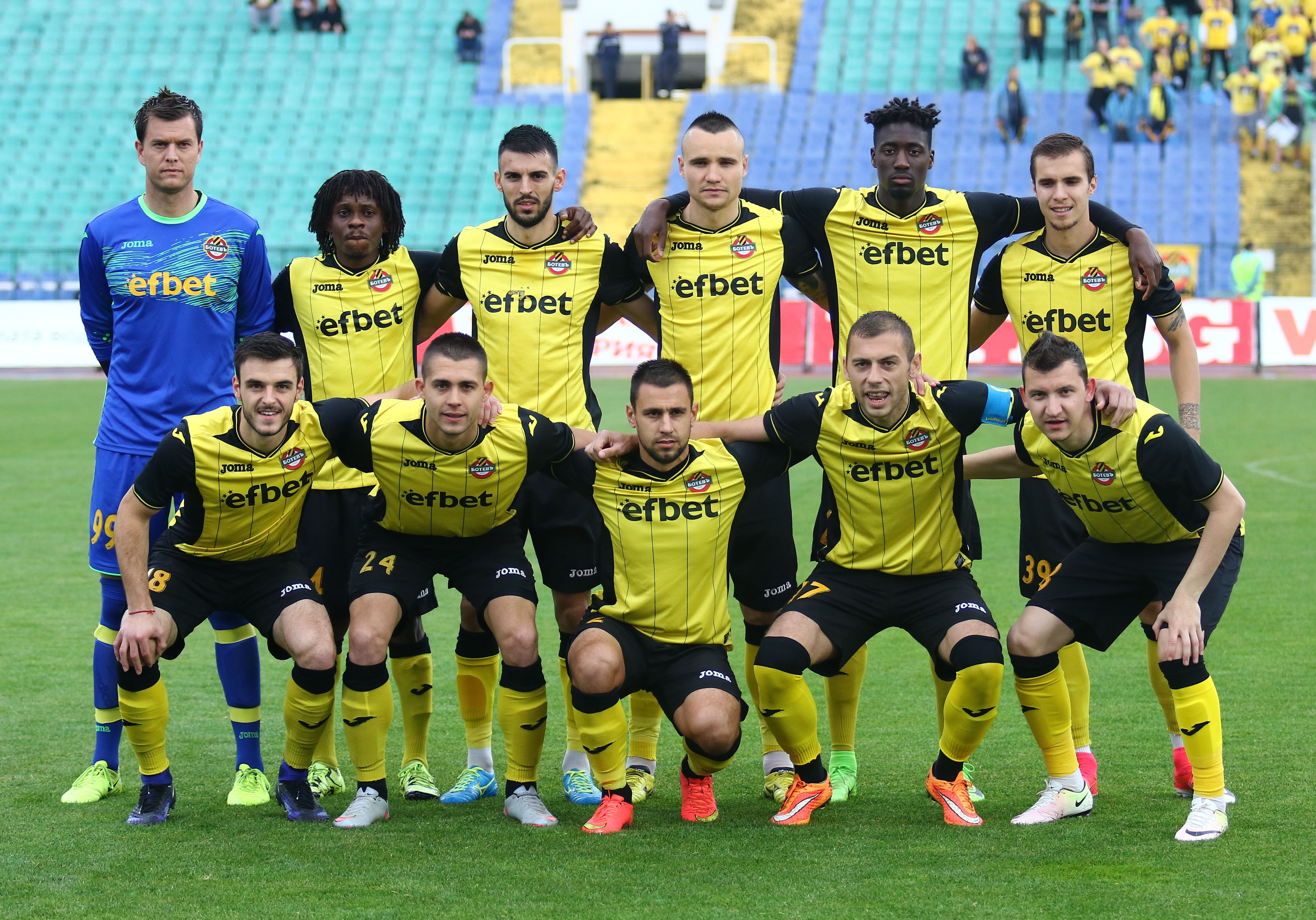
Botev Plovdiv before the 2017 Bulgarian Cup final against Ludogorets

In the 2012–13 A Group season, the club showed good performance and finished fourth. Botev Plovdiv was allowed to participate in the 2013–14 UEFA Europa League, taking the place of the then financially struggling CSKA Sofia, this marked the return of the team in Europe, after 18 years of absence. The club defeated the likes of Astana and Zrinjski Mostar, before being eliminated by Stuttgart in the third qualifying round. In 2013–14, Botev Plovdiv finished fourth once more and also reached the 2013–14 Bulgarian Cup final, where they lost 0–1 to Ludogorets Razgrad. The club faced the same opponents in the 2014 Bulgarian Supercup match, which was lost 1–3. On the European front, the team participated in 2014–15 UEFA Europa League, where they managed to eliminate Libertas, before losing to St. Pölten. The following seasons, the club frequently secured places in the middle of the table.

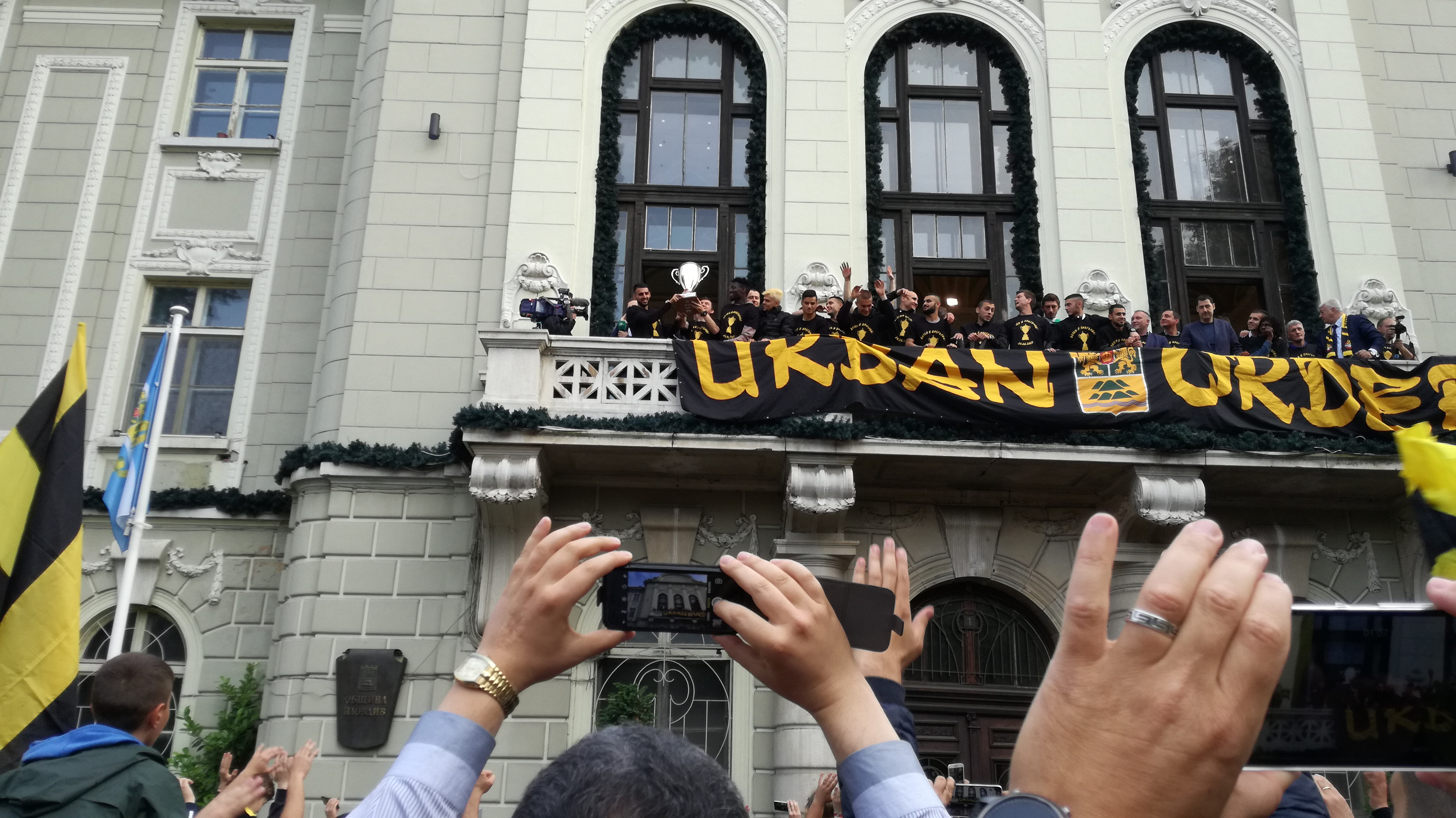
Botev Plovdiv celebrate winning the 2016–17 Bulgarian Cup, from the balcony of the city hall

On 24 May 2017, Botev Plovdiv won their 3rd Bulgarian cup title in a 2–1 win against Ludogorets Razgrad, by doing so the club secured a spot in the 2017–18 UEFA Europa League, where they met Partizani Tirana and Beitar Jerusalem, before being knocked out by Marítimo in the third qualifying round. On 9 August 2017, the club won its first Bulgarian Supercup title, beating Ludogorets Razgrad 5–4 on penalties, following a 1–1 draw in regular time. In June 2021, the establishment of a reserve team, Botev Plovdiv II, was announced. In July 2021, the club was acquired by former Reading Football Club owner Anton Zingarevich. The club won the 2024 Bulgarian Cup final by beating Ludogorets to claim their fourth domestic cup.

== Crest and colours ==
Botev Plovdiv's kit colours were adopted in August 1917, during a board meeting. The yellow colour represents the club's founders from Saint Augustine's Catholic College and Thrace's golden grain fields, while the black colour symbolises the black earth of the fertile soil as well as the Orthodoxy of the club's other founders from First Boys High School.

A following board meeting, held in September 1917, replaced the club's crest, which was an encircled Cyrillic letter "Б", an abbreviation for "Ботевъ", the club's full name. The new approved crest (used today) was a red circle, with a green rectangle situated centrally above, with the name of the club inscribed inside. Above the rectangle was a yellow and black striped shield, while the club's year of establishment was displayed underneath it.

The crests' white, green and red colours embody the tricolour of the Kingdom of Bulgaria. Simultaneously, they symbolise the blood of the heroes, the pureness of the souls, and Bulgaria's fertility. The shield is a symbol of the brave while the infinite circle suggests eternity.

=== Club motto ===
Botev Plovdiv's motto is Krasota, vyara i borba (Bulgarian: Красота, вяра и борба, pronounced [crɐsɔtɐ, vʝarɐ i bɔrbɐ], meaning Beauty, faith and fight).

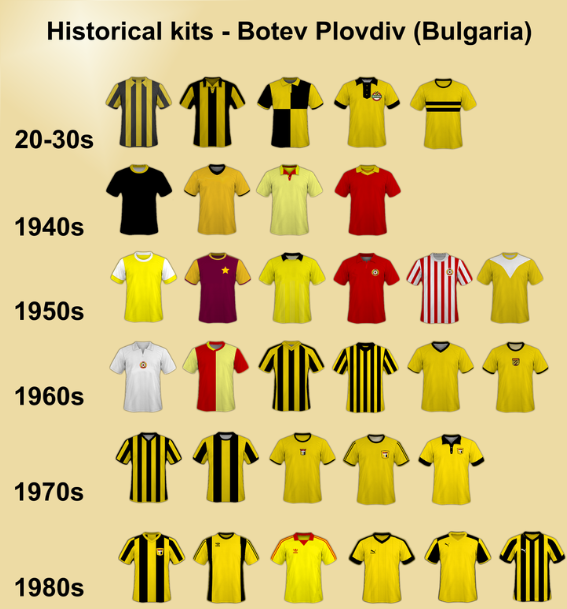
A part of Botev Plovdiv's kit history

== Grounds ==
In 1959, the authorities allowed the construction of a new club stadium at the place of the old field in the neighborhood of Kamenitza. The first building works began on 21 July 1959. Two years later, Botev Plovdiv returned to The college. On May 14, 1961, the reconstructed stadium was inaugurated. The prime minister – Anton Yugov – attended the celebrations together with the deputy-minister of the defence Dobri Djurov and most of the communist leaders. The celebrations ended with a friendly match against FC Steaua București won by the yellow-blacks with 3:0.

For more than 30 years, no big repairs were done on the college. In 1993, during the presidency of Hristo Danov, some serious repairs were made. The visitors' changing room was moved to the eastern part of the stadium. A tunnel under the East and the North stand was built to connect the visitors' changing room with the field and the capacity of the stadium was reduced. In 1995 electric lighting was put in, but ironically it did not reach the standards of the Bulgarian Football Union.

In the years from 1926 to 1947, Botev played six international games on the ground – two wins, three losses and one draw. The matches were played against Admira Vienna (1:7), Kecskemét (3:2 and 2:4), Beşiktaş (0:0), Bohemians Prague (1:3) and the famous "Wonderteam" of Austria Vienna (sensational win with 5:4) respectively. The attendance record was set on February 27, 1963, during the quarter-final of the Cup Winner's Cup against Atlético Madrid (1:1) – 40,000 people. The record for the Bulgarian championship was set in 1966 against Levski Sofia(0:1) – 37,000 people, but because of the riots between the fans and the rush of fans on the field, Botev Plovdiv was forced to play its derbies at "The Big House" – the City Stadium.

Several times, the stadium was used for football matches from the city rivals from Lokomotiv Plovdiv. During the second half of the 1980/81 season, "The Smurfs" (Lokomotiv Plovdiv) played their home matches on The college (which was followed by a relegation in the second division) as well as one match in the 2003/04 season (when Lokomotiv won the A PFG for the first time). Spartak Plovdiv also used the stadium for several matches during the 1995/1996 season. The stadium has also hosted the Bulgarian Cup final in 2000, when Levski Sofia won the cup after 2:0 against Naftex Burgas.

In the summer of 2008, the stadium underwent renovations to meet the requirements of the Football Union, the Central Stand was renovated and the new visitors' changing room was built under it.

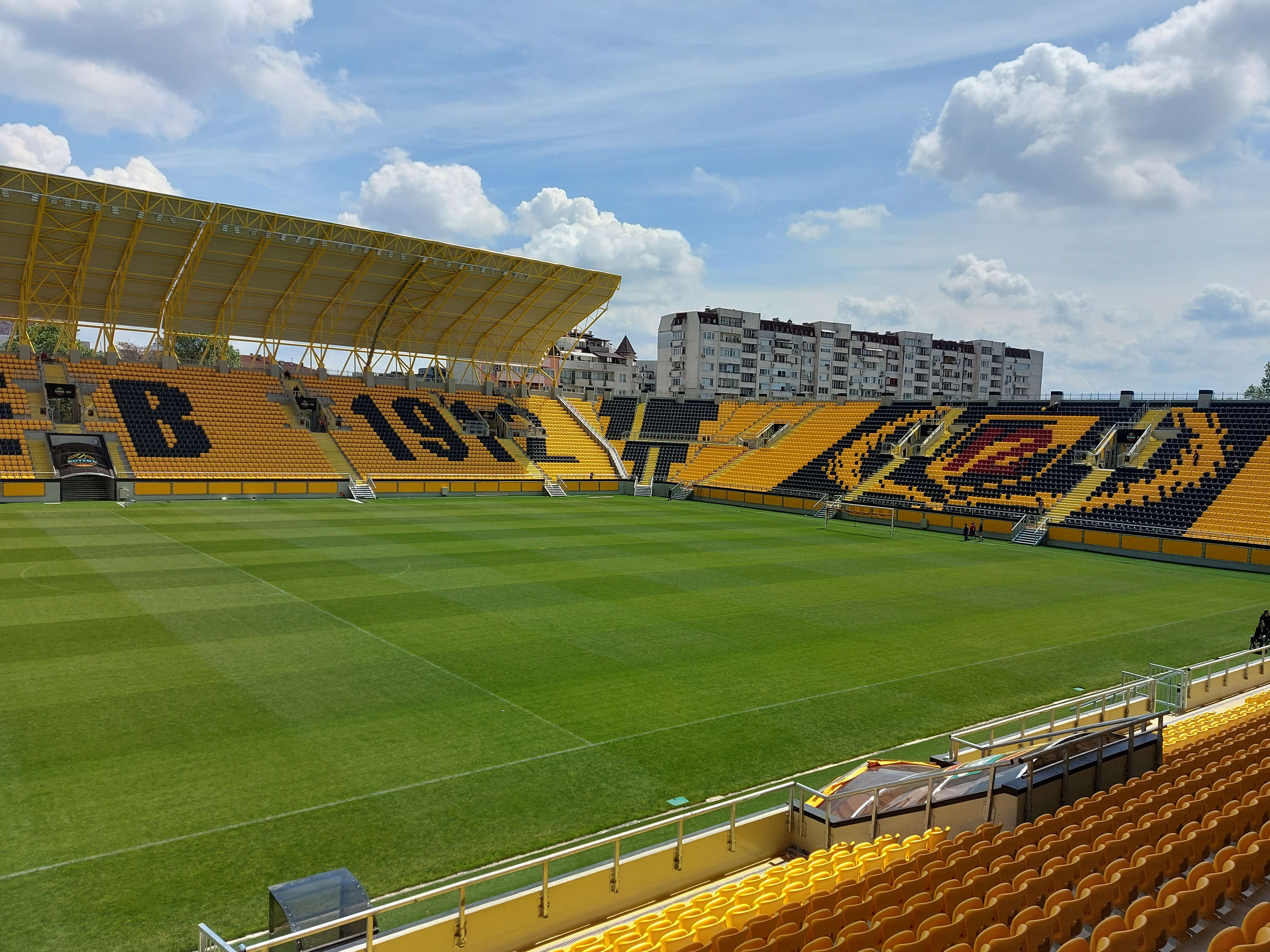
The reconstructed stadium

On March 26, 2012, began a major reconstruction of the stadium, starting with conceptual design by architect Georgi Savov and supported by the new owner of the team Tzvetan Vassilev. According to estimates construction will consume about 15 million euro, and the facility must be ready for operation by mid 2015 just in time to host matches at the 2015 UEFA European Under-17 Championship. The reconstruction will be carried out in two phases, the first starting from the end of March 2012 and will last four months. The first stage consists in the replacement of the field, which will have modern drainage system and heating system . The field will be measuring 68x105 meters. Second stage consists of the demolishing of the four old tribunes and building of new ones closer to the football field.

On home matchdays, Botev Plovdiv's players traditionally enter the pitch to the Blue Canary tune (by Marisa Fiordaliso and Carlo Buti) before the start of a game.

== Supporters and rivalries ==
Botev Plovdiv has maintained a strong fan base over the years and in terms of the popularity is staged as the third most supported club in Bulgaria. There is no unique umbrella organization embracing all fans of the Plovdiv Canaries. The club's ultras are known as bultras, located in the South stand (Juzhna Tribuna) of the home Stadion Botev.

Botev's rival is the neighbouring city club of Lokomotiv Plovdiv, and both form the local Plovdiv derby. The two teams are the most supported ones in the second largest city in Bulgaria – Plovdiv – and the matches between them are well known to the Bulgarian football community, and also considered to be one of the fiercest rivalries in the world. Botev is the country's oldest continuously existing team, whereas Lokomotiv grew popular fanbase in the 70s. Traditionally, Lokomotiv's team drew support from the lower working class of society, whereas Botev's fanbase consisted mainly of the middle and upper classes, although that no longer applies.

Botev's regional cross-city rival is Beroe. The match between the two clubs was dubbed as the "Thracian Derby" over the years.

The club also has a strong rivalry with Levski Sofia as the two are the most popular teams in their respective cities and their animosity is continuation of the Sofia-Plovdiv (Serdica-Trimontium) enmity.

Botev Plovdiv fans have friendly and supportive relations with Aris fans. In January 2020 a group of Botev fans that attended a game between Aris and their rival PAOK Thessaloniki was attacked by PAOK fans. One Botev fan was killed by a car. Two individuals were arrested and charged with murder.

Some bultra groups are connected in a friendship with the hardcore supporters of the Italian club Inter and the Dutch club PSV.

== Players ==
=== Current squad ===
As of 31 August 2026

Note: Flags indicate national team as defined under FIFA eligibility rules; some limited exceptions apply. Players may hold more than one non-FIFA nationality.

No.	Pos.	Nation	Player
1	GK	BUL	Hristiyan Slavkov
4	DF	CRO	Nikola Soldo
6	DF	BUL	Ivaylo Videv
7	FW	ESP	Alberto Salido (on loan from Ludogorets)
8	MF	BUL	Todor Nedelev (captain)
10	MF	BUL	Asen Chandarov
11	MF	BUL	Stanislav Shopov (on loan from Osijek)
13	FW	BUL	Samuil Tsonov
14	MF	ESP	Carlos Algarra
15	DF	BUL	Bogdan Kostov
16	MF	BUL	Veliyan Vidolov
17	MF	BUL	Georgi Milanov
18	DF	BUL	Gabriel Zlatanov
19	MF	GBS	Mauro Rodrigues
20	DF	UGA	Timothy Awany

No.	Pos.	Nation	Player
21	GK	BUL	Nikolay Prandzhev
22	DF	GER	Marvin Senger
23	MF	BUL	Dimitar Tonev
27	DF	GER	Bryan Hein
28	MF	POR	Henrique Jocú
29	GK	BUL	Daniel Naumov
30	FW	BRA	Franklin Mascote
44	MF	NGR	Ehije Ukaki (on loan from Sheffield United)
66	MF	POR	Carlos Meotti
77	MF	BRA	Lucas Araújo
82	DF	POR	Vladimir Mendes
87	DF	BUL	Simeon Petrov
88	FW	NGR	Chimezie Williams
90	FW	NGR	Samuel Kalu

For recent transfers, see List of Bulgarian football transfers summer 2026.

=== Out of loan ===
Note: Flags indicate national team as defined under FIFA eligibility rules; some limited exceptions apply. Players may hold more than one non-FIFA nationality.

No.	Pos.	Nation	Player
—	MF	BUL	Nikola Iliev (at Septemvri Sofia until 30 June 2027)
—	MF	GBS	Edson Silva (at Spartak Varna until 31 December 2026)
—	FW	BRA	Pedro Igor (at Septemvri Sofia until 30 June 2027)

No.	Pos.	Nation	Player
—	FW	NGR	Shola Adelani (at Spartak Pleven until 30 June 2027)
—	FW	NGR	Chidera Okoh (at Spartak Varna until 31 December 2026)

=== Foreign players ===
Up to twenty foreign nationals can be registered and given a squad number for the first team in the Bulgarian First League, however only five non-EU nationals can be used during a match day. Those non-EU nationals with European ancestry can claim citizenship from the nation their ancestors came from. If a player does not have European ancestry he can claim Bulgarian citizenship after playing in Bulgaria for 5 years.

EU Nationals

- (Croatia) Nikola Soldo
- (Germany) Marvin Senger
- (Spain) Carlos Algarra

EU Nationals (Dual citizenship)

- (Germany) (Nigeria) Bryan Hein
- (Portugal) (Brazil) Carlos Meotti
- (Portugal) (Guinea-Bissau) Edson Silva
- (Portugal) (Guinea-Bissau) Henrique Jocú
- (Portugal) (Guinea-Bissau) Vladimir Mendes
- (Guinea-Bissau) (Portugal) Mauro Rodrigues

Non-EU Nationals

- (Brazil) Franklin Mascote
- (Brazil) Lucas Araújo
- (Nigeria) Chidera Okoh
- (Nigeria) Chimezie Williams
- (Nigeria) Samuel Kalu
- (Uganda) Timothy Awany

=== Retired numbers ===
12 – Dedicated to the club's supporters

== Notable players ==
Had international caps for their respective countries, held any club record, or have more than 100 league appearance. Players whose name is listed in bold represented their countries.

Bulgaria

- (Bulgaria) **Aleksandar Aleksandrov**
- (Bulgaria) Georgi Andonov
- (Bulgaria) **Sasho Angelov**
- (Bulgaria) **Viden Apostolov**
- (Bulgaria) Lilcho Arsov
- (Bulgaria) **Georgi Asparuhov**
- (Bulgaria) Georgi Avramov
- (Bulgaria) Marin Bakalov
- (Bulgaria) **Lachezar Baltanov**
- (Bulgaria) **Ivan Bandalovski**
- (Bulgaria) **Daniel Bozhkov**
- (Bulgaria) **Tsvetelin Chunchukov**
- (Bulgaria) **Ivan Čvorović**
- (Bulgaria) **Marcho Dafchev**
- (Bulgaria) **Vangel Delev**
- (Bulgaria) **Dinko Dermendzhiev**
- (Bulgaria) **Kristian Dimitrov**
- (Bulgaria) **Kristian Dobrev**
- (Bulgaria) **Geno Dobrevski**
- (Bulgaria) **Nikolay Domakinov**
- (Bulgaria) **Valeri Domovchiyski**
- (Bulgaria) **Doncho Donev**
- (Bulgaria) **Georgi Donkov**
- (Bulgaria) **Spas Dzhevizov**
- (Bulgaria) **Engibar Engibarov**
- (Bulgaria) **Georgi Enisheynov**
- (Bulgaria) Filip Filipov
- (Bulgaria) **Boris Galchev**
- (Bulgaria) Viktor Genev
- (Bulgaria) **Georgi K. Georgiev**
- (Bulgaria) **Georgi N. Georgiev**
- (Bulgaria) **Georgi Haralampiev**
- (Bulgaria) **Rumen Hristov**
- (Bulgaria) **Yordan Hristov**
- (Bulgaria) **Boris Hvoynev**
- (Bulgaria) **Atanas Iliev**
- (Bulgaria) **Hristo Iliev**
- (Bulgaria) **Nikola Iliev**
- (Bulgaria) **Bozhidar Iskrenov**
- (Bulgaria) **Hristo Ivanov**
- (Bulgaria) **Mihail Ivanov**
- (Bulgaria) **Georgi Kakalov**
- (Bulgaria) **Martin Kamburov**
- (Bulgaria) **Yanis Karabelyov**
- (Bulgaria) **Kaloyan Karadzhinov**
- (Bulgaria) Borislav Karamatev
- (Bulgaria) **Asen Karaslavov**
- (Bulgaria) **Mihail Karushkov**
- (Bulgaria) **Hristo Koilov**
- (Bulgaria) **Aleksandar Kolev**
- (Bulgaria) **Kostadin Kostadinov**
- (Bulgaria) **Aleksandar Kostov**
- (Bulgaria) **Stanislav Kostov**
- (Bulgaria) **Nikola Kovachev**
- (Bulgaria) **Petar Kurdov**
- (Bulgaria) **Yordan Linkov**
- (Bulgaria) **Georgi Markov**
- (Bulgaria) **Borislav Mihaylov**
- (Bulgaria) **Georgi Milanov**
- (Bulgaria) Nedko Milenov
- (Bulgaria) **Veselin Minev**
- (Bulgaria) **Yordan Minev**
- (Bulgaria) **Dobromir Mitov**
- (Bulgaria) **Dimitar Mladenov**
- (Bulgaria) **Georgi Yordanov Naydenov**
- (Bulgaria) **Daniel Naumov**
- (Bulgaria) **Todor Nedelev**
- (Bulgaria) **Plamen Nikolov**
- (Bulgaria) **Mariyan Ognyanov**
- (Bulgaria) **Tsvetomir Panov**
- (Bulgaria) **Atanas Pashev**
- (Bulgaria) **Antim Pehlivanov**
- (Bulgaria) **Petar Penchev**
- (Bulgaria) Anastas Petrov
- (Bulgaria) **Georgi Petrov**
- (Bulgaria) **Yasen Petrov**
- (Bulgaria) **Dimitar Pirgov**
- (Bulgaria) **Apostol Popov**
- (Bulgaria) **Dimitar Popov**
- (Bulgaria) **Georgi Popov**
- (Bulgaria) **Ivelin Popov**
- (Bulgaria) **Ivan Pritargov**
- (Bulgaria) **Zapryan Rakov**
- (Bulgaria) **Ayan Sadakov**
- (Bulgaria) Dormushali Saidhodzha
- (Bulgaria) **Georgi Sarmov**
- (Bulgaria) **Stanislav Shopov**
- (Bulgaria) **Nikola Shterev**
- (Bulgaria) **Nasko Sirakov**
- (Bulgaria) **Georgi Slavkov**
- (Bulgaria) Ivan Sotirov
- (Bulgaria) **Ivan Stoyanov**
- (Bulgaria) **Vladimir Stoyanov**
- (Bulgaria) **Rayko Stoynov**
- (Bulgaria) **Dimitar Telkiyski**
- (Bulgaria) Radoslav Terziev
- (Bulgaria) **Aleksandar Tonev**
- (Bulgaria) **Momchil Tsvetanov**
- (Bulgaria) **Ivan Tsvetkov**
- (Bulgaria) **Vasil Vasilev**
- (Bulgaria) **Kostadin Vidolov**
- (Bulgaria) **Georgi Vladimirov**
- (Bulgaria) **Antonio Vutov**
- (Bulgaria) **Ivan Vutsov**
- (Bulgaria) **Krum Yanev**
- (Bulgaria) **Dimitar Yordanov**
- (Bulgaria) **Serkan Yusein**
- (Bulgaria) Todor Zaytsev
- (Bulgaria) **Petar Zehtinski**

Europe

- (Armenia) **Armen Ambartsumyan**
- (France) Antoine Baroan
- (Czech Republic) Tomáš Jirsák
- (Estonia) **Joonas Tamm**
- (Romania) **Srdjan Luchin**
- (Lithuania) **Ernestas Šetkus**
- (Lithuania) **Faustas Steponavičius**
- (North Macedonia) **Boban Grnčarov**
- (Ukraine) **Ihor Oshchypko**

Africa

- (Burkina Faso) **Habib Bamogo**
- (Cameroon) **Gustave Bahoken**
- (Cape Verde) **Sténio**
- (Republic of the Congo) **Férébory Doré**
- (Republic of the Congo) **Rahavi Kifouéti**
- (Guinea) **Antoine Conte**
- (Guinea) **Pa Konate**
- (Guinea-Bissau) **Edson Silva**
- (Tunisia) **Hamza Younés**
- (Madagascar) **Anicet Abel**
- (Nigeria) **Tochukwu Nnadi**
- (Nigeria) **Samuel Kalu**
- (Uganda) **Timothy Awany**

Americas

- (Aruba) **Marlon Pereira Freire**
- (Honduras) **Luis López**

== Honours ==
=== Domestic ===
- First League
  - Winners (2): 1929, 1966–67
- Bulgarian Cup
  - Winners (4): 1961–62, 1980–81, 2016–17, 2023–24
- Bulgarian Supercup
  - Winners (1): 2017

=== European ===
- Balkans Cup
  - Winners (1): 1972

== European record ==
=== Summary ===
Competition	S	P	W	D	L	GF	GA	GD
Inter-Cities Fairs Cup	2	4	1	0	3	4	9	5
Balkans Cup	2	10	4	1	5	25	25	0
UEFA Cup Winners' Cup	3	12	6	2	4	23	18	+ 5
Intertoto Cup	2	10	3	1	6	19	17	+ 2
European Cup / UEFA Champions League	2	4	1	0	3	5	8	3
UEFA Cup / UEFA Europa League	10	34	11	11	10	53	39	+ 14
UEFA Europa Conference League	1	2	0	1	1	0	2	2
Total	22	76	28	16	32	129	118	+ 11

=== UEFA ranking ===
As of the 2017 UEFA club coefficient.

Rank	Club	Coeff
271	(Cyprus) Ermis Aradippou FC	4.710
272	(Bulgaria) PFC Beroe Stara Zagora	4.675
273	(Bulgaria) PFC Botev Plovdiv	4.675
274	(Norway) Aalesunds FK	4.665
275	(Slovenia) NK Olimpija Ljubljana	4.625

=== Past seasons ===
- 71 seasons in A Group
- 5 seasons in B Group
- 2 seasons in V Group

== Club officials ==
As of November 2022

Name	Position
Management and board
(Bulgaria) Vassil Bosneschki	Board Member / CEO
(Bulgaria) Ilko Koparanski	Board Member
(Bulgaria) Kolyo Petrov	Board Member
(Bulgaria) Ilian Filipov	Custodian
(Bulgaria) Dimitar Dimitrov-Hero	Sporting Director
Coaching staff
(Bulgaria) Todor Kiselichkov	First Coach
(Bulgaria) Lachezar Baltanov	Assistant Coach
(Bulgaria) Georgi Chakarov	Hosting Support
Youth academy staff
(Bulgaria) Ivan Tsvetanov	Academy director

=== Head coaches ===
Key
* Served as caretaker manager.

The table below is a list of the recent BPFC's managers.

Name	Nat.	From	To	Honours
Azrudin Valentić	SWE	8 January 2021	29 July 2022	
Artur Hovhannisyan*	ARM	29 July 2022	2 August 2022	
Željko Kopić	HRV	3 August 2022	6 December 2022	
Bruno Baltazar	POR	3 January 2023	23 May 2023	
Stefan Stoyanov*	BGR	25 May 2023	6 June 2023	–
Stanislav Genchev	BGR	8 June 2023	22 August 2023	–
Rafael Ferreira*	BRA	22 August 2023	3 September 2023	–
Dušan Kerkez	BIH	4 September 2023	31 May 2025	1 Bulgarian Cup
Nikolay Kirov	BGR	29 June 2025	25 September 2025	–
Ivan Tsvetanov*	BGR	26 September 2025	8 November 2025	–
Dimitar Dimitrov	BGR	17 November 2025		–

=== Chairmen ===
Chairman	Nat	From	To
Stoyan Puhtev	(Bulgaria)	1912	1920
Ivan Dimitrov	(Bulgaria)	1920	1921
Ivan Nikiforov	(Bulgaria)	1922	1923
Georgui Hitrilov	(Bulgaria)	1924	1926
Hristo Kanchev	(Bulgaria)	1926	1936
Ivan Indzhev	(Bulgaria)	1936	1937
Ivan Manev	(Bulgaria)	1937	1938
Todor Milyonov	(Bulgaria)	1938	1939
Dimitar Guikov	(Bulgaria)	1939	1941
Dimitar Velichkov	(Bulgaria)	1941	1943
Nikola Christodoulou	(Bulgaria)	1943	1944
Isaac Katalan	(Bulgaria)	1944	1944
Stoyo Seizov	(Bulgaria)	1944	1947
Dimitar Ganchev	(Bulgaria)	1947	1953
Dimitar Vangelov	(Bulgaria)	1953	1960
Yovcho Yovchev	(Bulgaria)	1960	1964
Stanko Stankov	(Bulgaria)	1964	1972
Kiril Asparuhov	(Bulgaria)	1972	13.09.1990

Chairman	Nat	From	To
Viden Apostolov	(Bulgaria)	13.09.1990	01.10.1992
Petar Baldzhiev	(Bulgaria)	01.10.1992	16.01.1993
Hristo Danov	(Bulgaria)	16.01.1993	04.01.1995
Mihail Markachev	(Bulgaria)	04.01.1995	14.10.1996
Georgi Chakarov	(Bulgaria)	14.10.1996	16.09.1997
Petko Muravenov	(Bulgaria)	16.09.1997	26.11.1997
Vassil Koritarev	(Bulgaria)	26.11.1997	16.12.1997
Vasko Ninov	(Bulgaria)	16.12.1997	16.03.1999
Dimitar Hristolov	(Bulgaria)	19.03.1999	29.04.2010
Marin Bakalov	(Bulgaria)	29.04.2010	30.10.2011
Yuli Popov	(Bulgaria)	31.10.2011	19.03.2014
Ivan Dzhidzhev	(Bulgaria)	19.03.2014	07.07.2015
Angel Paliyski	(Bulgaria)	07.07.2015	24.07.2018
Georgi Samuilov	(Bulgaria)	03.10.2018	07.01.2021
Daniel Cerejido	(Spain)	07.01.2021	13.04.2022
Anton Zingarevich	(Israel)	13.04.2022	27.06.2025
Vassil Bosneschki	(Bulgaria)	01.07.2025	in charge

== Records ==
Most league appearances

#	Name	Apps
1	(Bulgaria) Dinko Dermendzhiev	447
2	(Bulgaria) Viden Apostolov	429
3	(Bulgaria) Zapryan Rakov	359
4	(Bulgaria) Marin Bakalov	353
5	(Bulgaria) Petar Zehtinski	350
5	(Bulgaria) Kostadin Kostadinov	350
7	(Bulgaria) Dimitar Mladenov	347
8	(Bulgaria) Slavcho Horozov	341
9	(Bulgaria) Trifon Pachev	320
10	(Bulgaria) Georgi Popov	309

Most league goals

#	Name	Gls
1	(Bulgaria) Dinko Dermendzhiev	194
2	(Bulgaria) Kostadin Kostadinov	106
3	(Bulgaria) Atanas Pashev	100
4	(Bulgaria) Antim Pehlivanov	89
5	(Bulgaria) Ivan Sotirov	86
6	(Bulgaria) Georgi Popov	83
7	(Bulgaria) Todor Nedelev	81
8	(Bulgaria) Dobrin Nenov	76
9	(Bulgaria) Boris Hvoynev	75
10	(Bulgaria) Georgi Slavkov	61

Bulgarian league top scorers

Year	Name	Gls
1961	(Bulgaria) Ivan Sotirov	20
1975	(Bulgaria) Ivan Pritargov	20
1981	(Bulgaria) Georgi Slavkov	31
1983	(Bulgaria) Antim Pehlivanov	20
1986	(Bulgaria) Atanas Pashev	30
2008	(Bulgaria) Georgi Hristov	19

Note: For a complete list of Botev Plovdiv players, see Category:Botev Plovdiv players.

=== Player of the year ===
Year	Winner
2010–11	(Bulgaria) Atanas Kurdov
2011–12	(Bulgaria) Aleksandar Aleksandrov
2012–13	(Bulgaria) Ivan Tsvetkov
2013–14	(Poland) Adam Stachowiak
2014–15	(Bulgaria) Lachezar Baltanov
2015–16	(Bulgaria) Lachezar Baltanov
2016–17	(Bulgaria) Todor Nedelev
2017–18	(Bulgaria) Todor Nedelev
2018–19	(Bulgaria) Todor Nedelev
2019–20	(Bulgaria) Todor Nedelev
2020–21	(Bulgaria) Todor Nedelev
2021–22	(France) Réda Rabeï
2022–23	(Austria) Hidajet Hankić
2023–24	(Bulgaria) Ivelin Popov
2024–25	(Bulgaria) Nikolay Minkov
