= Whitchurch =

Whitchurch may refer to:

== Places ==
=== Canada ===
- Whitchurch, Ontario, since 1971 part of Whitchurch-Stouffville, Ontario

=== England ===
- Whitchurch, Bristol
- Whitchurch, Buckinghamshire
- Whitchurch, Devon, in Tavistock
  - Whitchurch, Devon (parish), a civil parish in Devon
- Whitchurch, Hampshire
- Whitchurch, Herefordshire
- Whitchurch, Middlesex, a former name for Little Stanmore
- Whitchurch, Shropshire
- Whitchurch, Warwickshire
- Whitchurch Canonicorum, Dorset
- Whitchurch-on-Thames, Oxfordshire

=== Wales ===
- Whitchurch, Cardiff, Wales
- Whitchurch, Pembrokeshire, near St. David's
- Whitchurch-by-Cardigan, Pembrokeshire (usually called Eglwyswen)

== People ==
- Aaron Whitchurch (born 1992), Australian rugby league player
- Edward Whitchurch (died 1561), English printer and publisher of Protestant works
- Ernie Whitchurch (1891–1957), English footballer
- Harry Frederick Whitchurch (1866–1907), English soldier
- Philip Whitchurch (born 1951), British actor

== See also ==
- Whitchurch (UK Parliament constituency)
- Whitchurch railway station (disambiguation)
- Whitchurch Rural District (disambiguation)
- Whitechurch (disambiguation)
- White Church (disambiguation)

=== Language equivalents ===
- Weisskirchen (disambiguation) (German-language equivalents)
- Whitkirk (disambiguation)
- Whitekirk, East Lothian, Scotland, a village
