= 1956 Bulgarian Cup =

Tournament details
- Country: Bulgaria

Final positions
- Champions: Levski Sofia (6th cup)
- Runners-up: Botev Plovdiv

Tournament statistics
- Top goal scorer(s): Hristo Iliev (Levski) (5 goals)

The 1956 Bulgarian Cup was the 16th season of the Bulgarian Cup (in this period the tournament was named Cup of the Soviet Army). Levski Sofia won the competition, beating Botev Plovdiv 5–2 in the final at the Vasil Levski National Stadium in Sofia.

== First round ==
Team 1	Score	Team 2
Urozhay Tarnava	1–0	Zavod Voroshilov Sofia
Spartak Varna	1–0	SKNA Ruse
Cherno More Varna	1–3 (a.e.t.)	Levski Sofia
Akademik Svishtov	1–0	Spartak Pleven
Beroe Stara Zagora	4–0	Lokomotiv Burgas
Dimitrovgrad	1–3	Lokomotiv Plovdiv
Zavod Stalin Pernik	3–0	SKNA Blagoevgrad
Dunav Ruse	3–0 (w/o)	Lokomotiv Shumen
Pavlikeni	1–1 (a.e.t.)	Spartak Sofia
Replay
Pavlikeni	0–1	Spartak Sofia

== Second round ==
Team 1	Score	Team 2
Levski Sofia	2–1 (a.e.t.)	Minyor Pernik
Dunav Ruse	1–0	Zavod 12 Sofia
Spartak Varna	2–0	Zavod Stalin Pernik
Beroe Stara Zagora	1–2 (a.e.t.)	Botev Plovdiv
Akademik Svishtov	0–1	Spartak Sofia
Urozhay Tarnava	0–3	Spartak Plovdiv
Lokomotiv Sofia	3–2	Slavia Sofia
Lokomotiv Plovdiv	0–0 (a.e.t.)	CSKA Sofia
Replay
Lokomotiv Plovdiv	2–3	CSKA Sofia

== Quarter-finals ==
Team 1	Score	Team 2
Botev Plovdiv	1–0 (a.e.t.)	Spartak Plovdiv
Levski Sofia	3–1	Dunav Ruse
Spartak Varna	0–1	Lokomotiv Sofia
CSKA Sofia	1–0	Spartak Sofia

== Semi-finals ==
Team 1	Score	Team 2
Levski Sofia	1–0	Lokomotiv Sofia
Botev Plovdiv	2–1	CSKA Sofia

== Final ==
=== Details ===
18 November 1956

Levski Sofia	5−2	Botev Plovdiv
Atanasov 18' (o.g.); Iliev 21', 69'; Yordanov 37'; Georgiev 77'		Karadaliev 24'; Sotirov 44'

Vasil Levski National Stadium, Sofia
Attendance: 40,000
Referee: Georgi Hristov (Sofia)

Levski	Botev
