= Milkov =

Milkov is a surname. Notable people with this surname include:

- Ivan Milkov Chomakov (born 1953), Bulgarian politician and former mayor of Plovdiv (1999–2007)
- Milan Milkov (born 1996), Macedonian professional basketballer
- Stefan Milkov Ginchev (born 1994), Bulgarian professional footballer

== See also ==
- Malkovich
- Milkov Point, a rocky point on the east side of Lanchester Bay, in the Antarctic Peninsula
