= Pavlikeni Municipality =

Pavlikeni Municipality Община Павликени
- Municipality
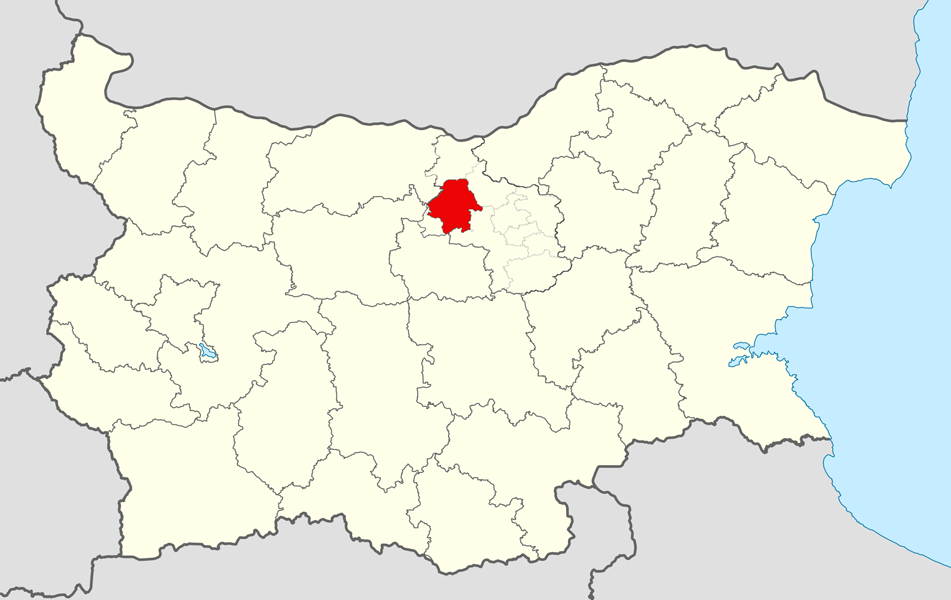
- Pavlikeni Municipality within Bulgaria and Veliko Tarnovo Province.
- Coordinates: 43°16′N 25°19′E
- Country: Bulgaria
- Province (Oblast): Veliko Tarnovo
- Admin. centre (Obshtinski tsentar): Pavlikeni

Area
  - Total: 622 km^{2} (240 sq mi)

Population (December 2009)
  - Total: 26,342
  - Density: 42.4/km^{2} (110/sq mi)
- Time zone: UTC+2 (EET)
  - Summer (DST): UTC+3 (EEST)

Pavlikeni Municipality (Bulgarian: Община Павликени) is a municipality (obshtina) in Veliko Tarnovo Province, Central-North Bulgaria, located mostly in the Danubian Plain. It is named after its administrative centre - the town of Pavlikeni.

The municipality embraces a territory of 622.56 km^{2} (240.37 sq mi) with a population of 26,342 inhabitants, as of December 2009.

The Hemus motorway is planned to cross the area, connecting the capital city of Sofia with the port of Varna on the Bulgarian Black Sea Coast.

== Settlements ==
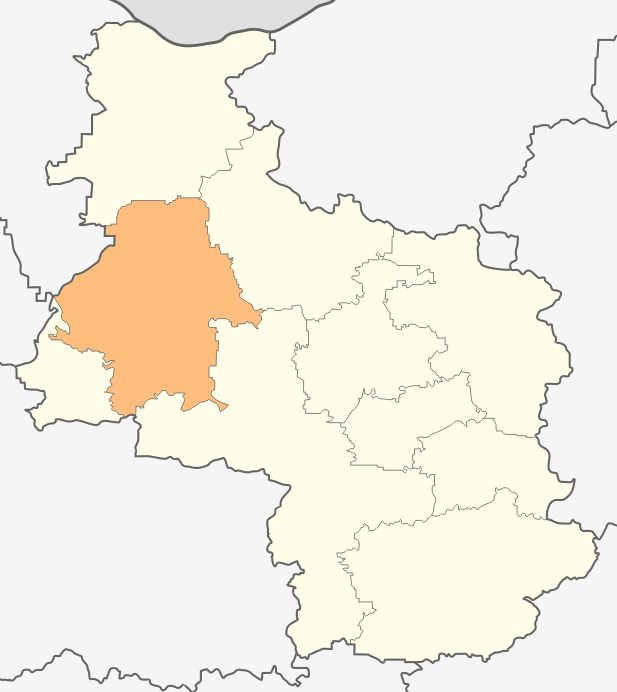
Pavlikeni Municipality within Veliko Tarnovo Province

Pavlikeni Municipality includes the following 20 places (towns are shown in bold):

Town/Village	Cyrillic	Population (December 2009)
**Pavlikeni**	**Павликени**	11,151
Batak	Батак	951
Butovo	Бутово	922
**Byala Cherkva**	**Бяла Черква**	2,612
Dolna Lipnitsa	Долна Липница	806
Dimcha	Димча	411
Daskot	Дъскот	488
Gorna Lipnitsa	Горна Липница	646
Karaisen	Караисен	1,210
Lesicheri	Лесичери	571
Mihaltsi	Михалци	952
Musina	Мусина	242
Nedan	Недан	1,384
Patresh	Патреш	572
Paskalevets	Паскалевец	315
Rositsa	Росица	169
Slomer	Сломер	454
Stambolovo	Стамболово	831
Vishovgrad	Вишовград	367
Varbovka	Върбовка	1,288
Total		26,342

== Demography ==
The following table shows the change of the population during the last four decades.

Pavlikeni Municipality
Year	1975	1985	1992	2001	2005	2007	2009	2011
Population	40,805	36,709	35,238	31,312	28,845	27,592	26,342	...
Sources: Census 2001, Census 2011, „pop-stat.mashke.org“,

=== Religion ===
According to the latest Bulgarian census of 2011, the religious composition, among those who answered the optional question on religious identification, was the following:

Religious composition of Pavlikeni Municipality
Orthodox Christianity	78.5%
Catholicism	0.5%
Protestantism	0.5%
Islam	5.7%
No religion	7.7%
Prefer not to answer, others and indefinable	7.1%

== See also ==
- Provinces of Bulgaria
- Municipalities of Bulgaria
- List of cities and towns in Bulgaria
