= Byala Cherkva =

Byala Cherkva Бяла черква
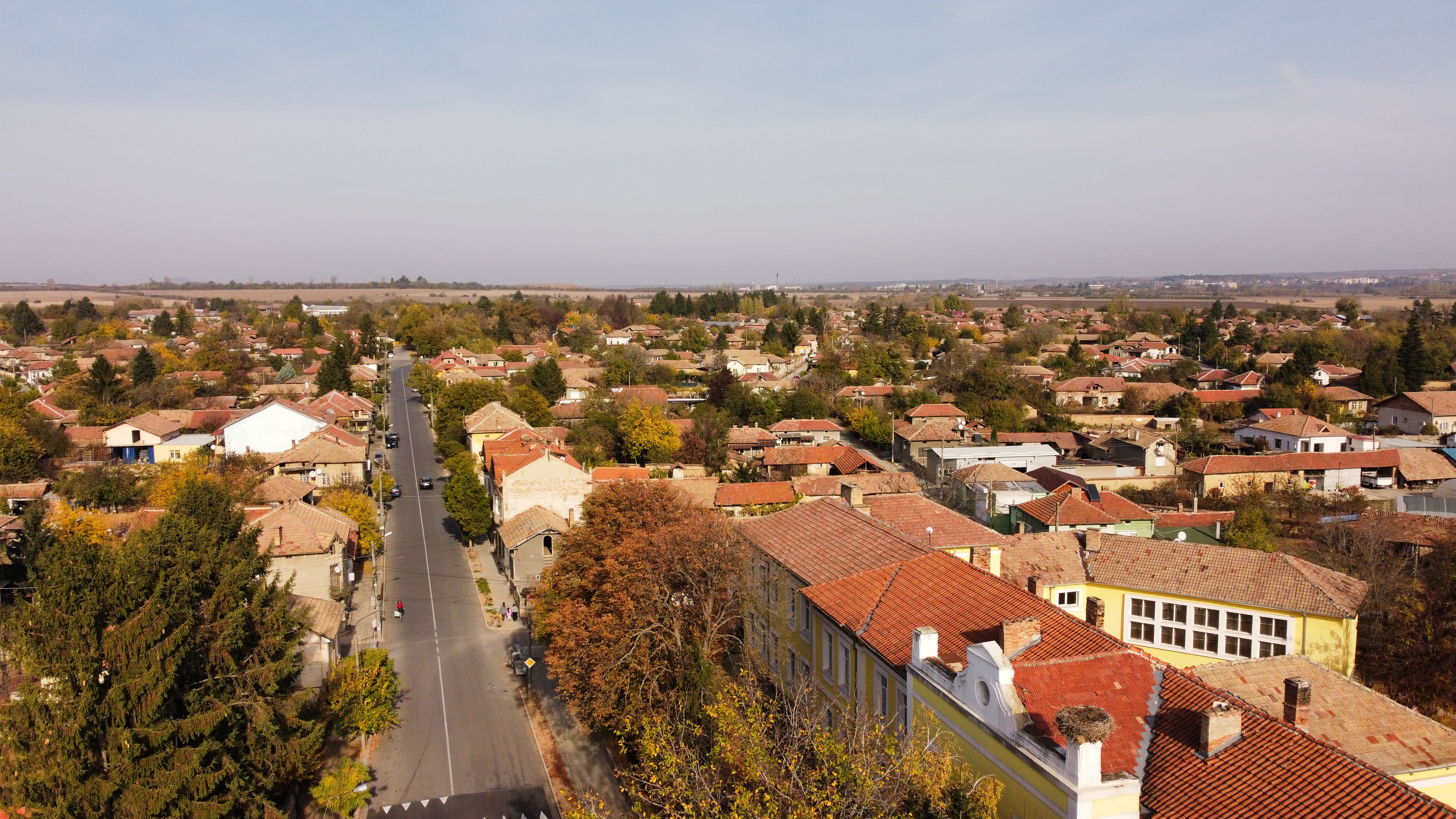

- Location of Byala Cherkva
- Coordinates: 43°12′N 25°18′E
- Country: Bulgaria
- Provinces (Oblast): Veliko Turnovo

Government
  - Mayor: Ivan Petkov
- Elevation: 104 m (341 ft)

Population (31.12.2009)
  - Total: 2,612
- Time zone: UTC+2 (EET)
  - Summer (DST): UTC+3 (EEST)
- Postal Code: 5220
- Area code: 06134

Byala Cherkva (Bulgarian: Бяла черква) is a town in Pavlikeni Municipality, Veliko Turnovo Province, Bulgaria. The settlement is located close to the town of Pavlikeni about 28 kilometres (17 mi) away from the city of Veliko Tarnovo. Its name in Bulgarian means white church, a popular place name around the world, equivalent to Bela Crkva, Weisskirchen, Whitechurch, etc. As of December 2009, the town had a population of 2,612.

Notable natives include the revolutionary Bacho Kiro (1835–1876), the poet and minister of culture Tsanko Tserkovski, and politician Rayko Daskalov.

== History ==
The first settlement - Byala Cherkva - originated on the higher right bank of the Rositsa river during the first Bulgarian state, as at the beginning of the 13th century. Later the village was known as Murad Bey and Gorni Turcheta. In 1832 people from the village built the first church - "St. Dimitar".

== Schools ==
- School "Bacho Kiro"

== Church ==
- Church "Saint Dimitar"

== Tourism ==
The town area spots churches, monuments and river bridges.

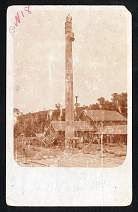
Factory in Byala Cherkva

== Gallery ==
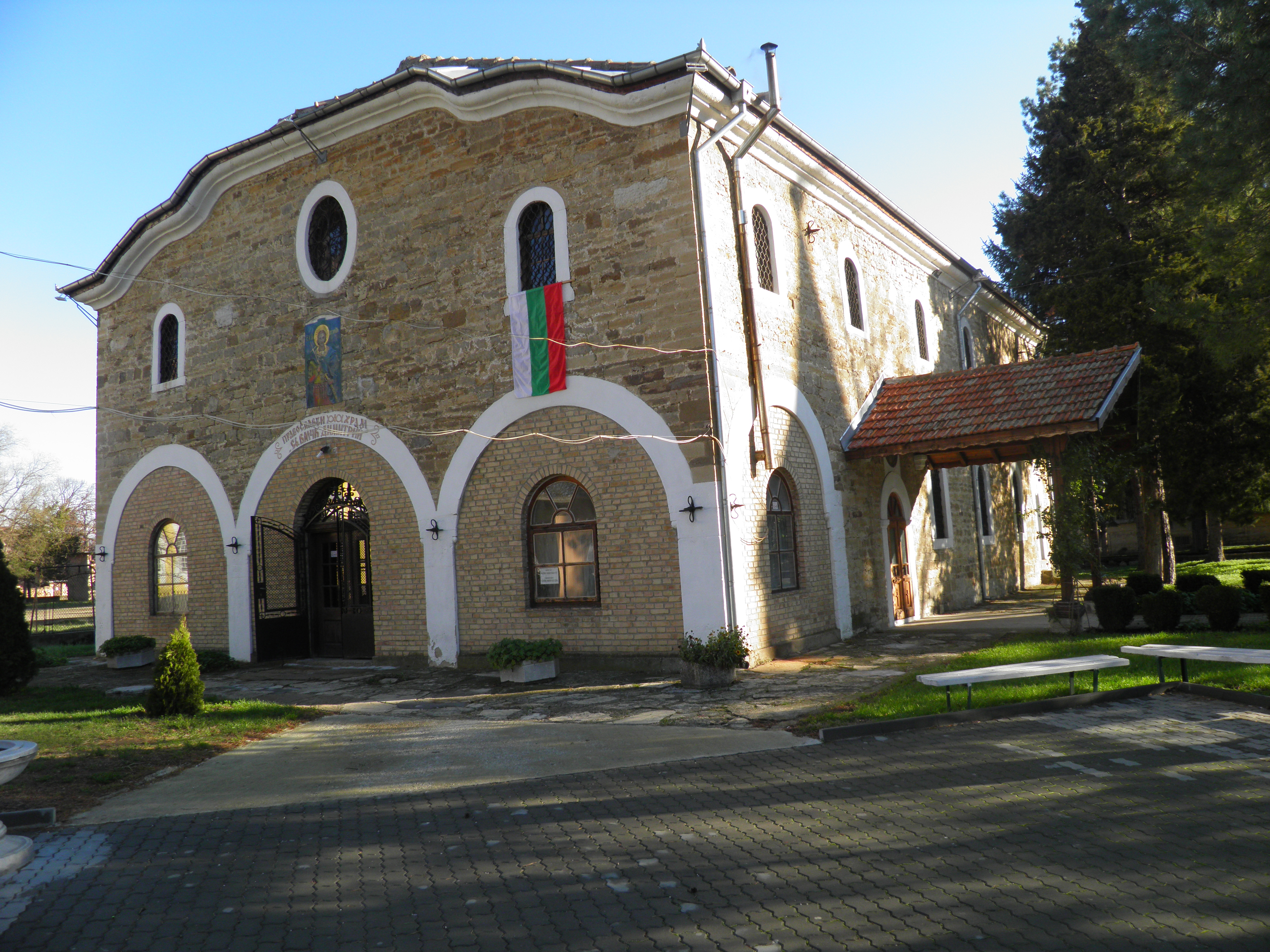
Saint Demetrius church

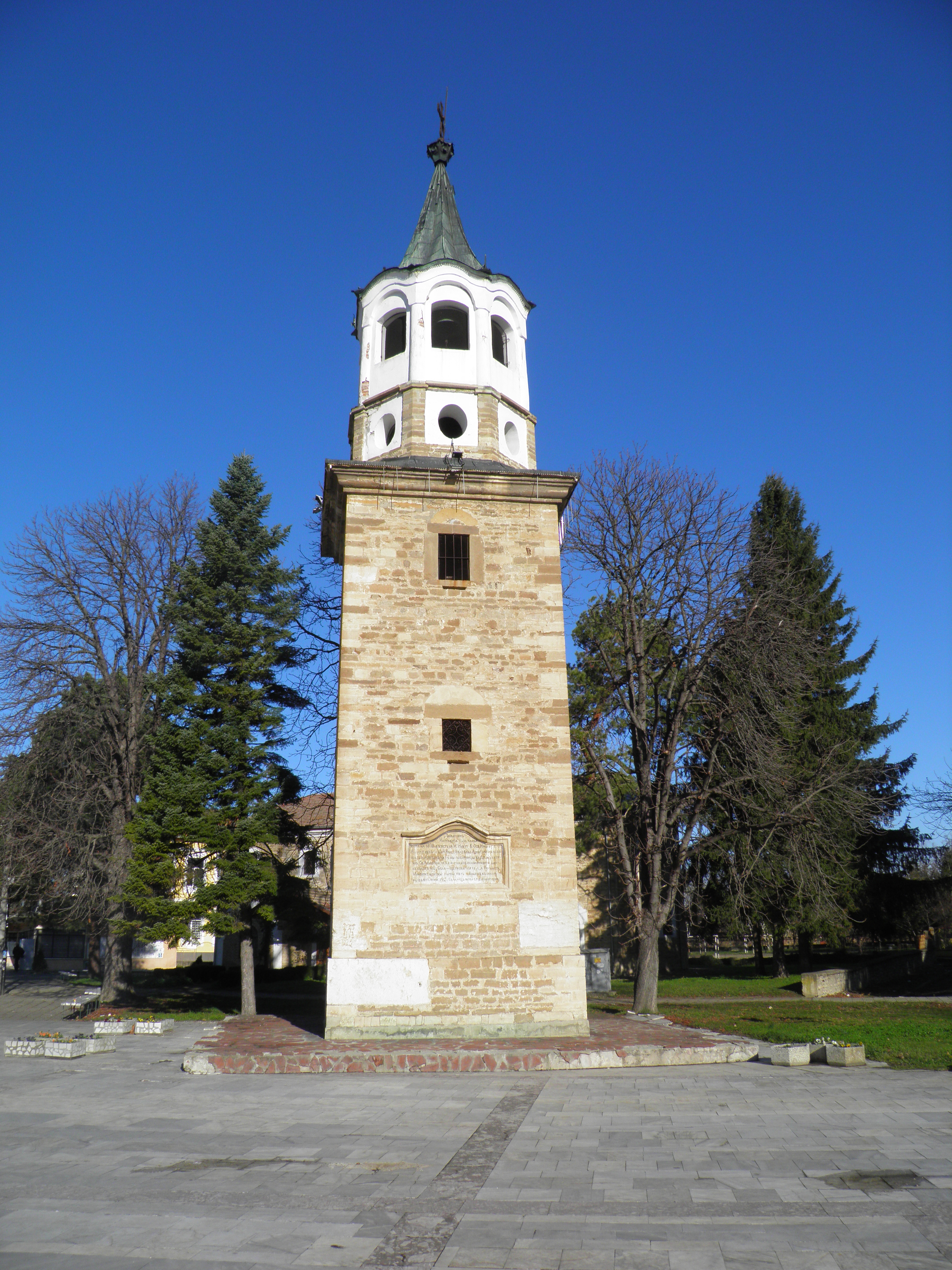
Belfry

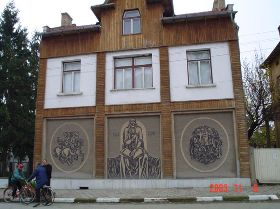
Museum

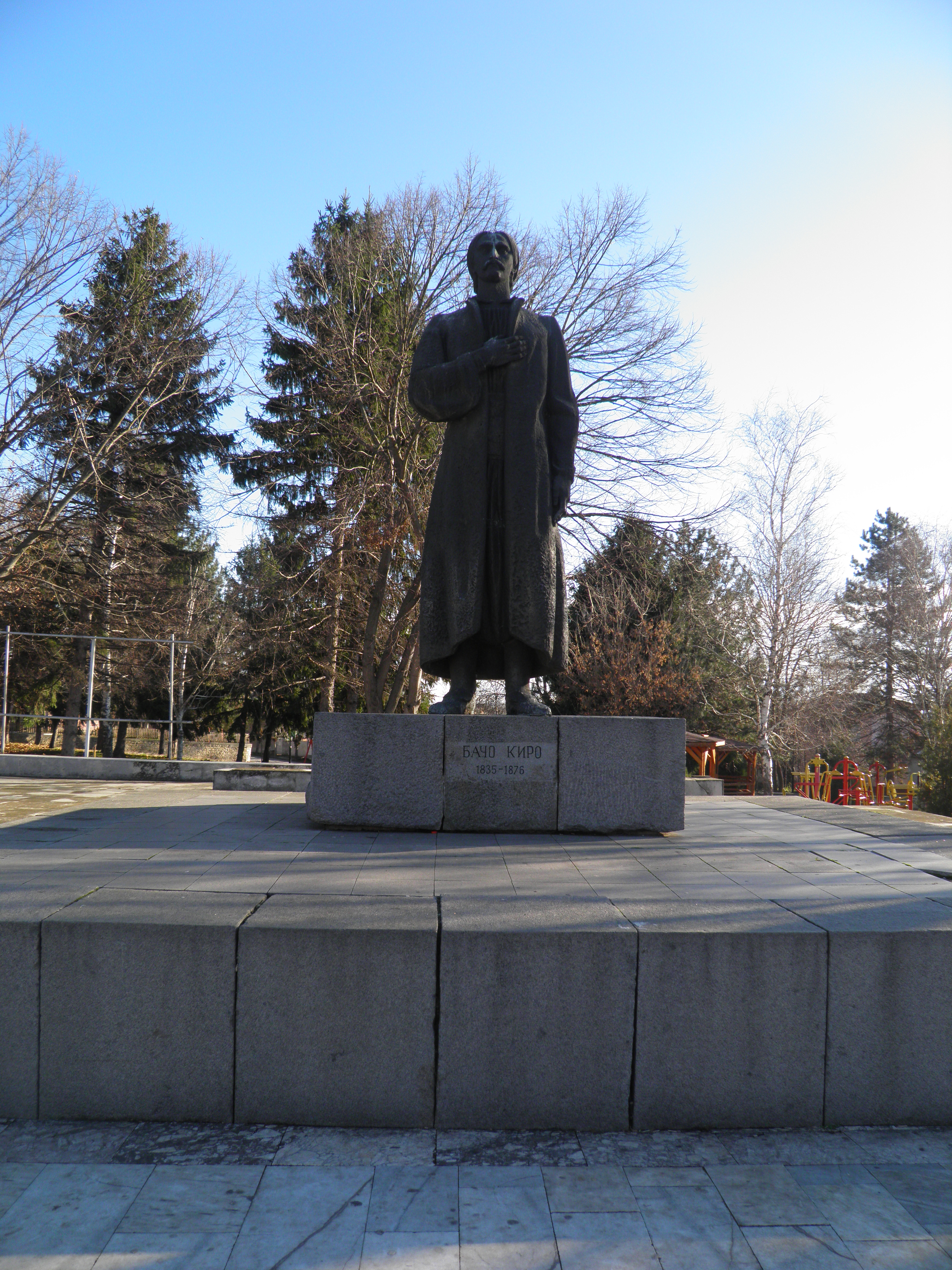
Monument of Bacho Kiro

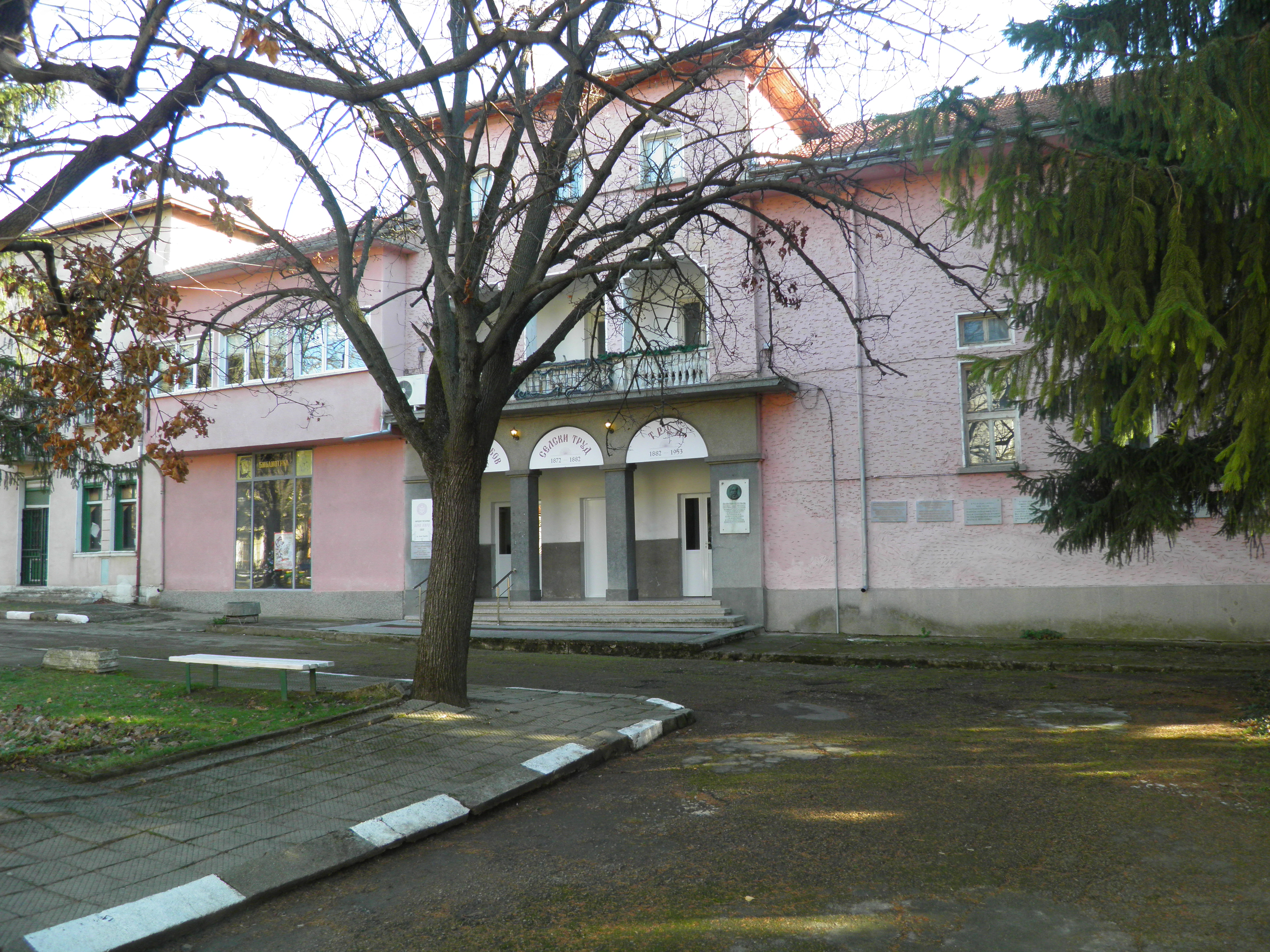
Culture center Bacho Kiro

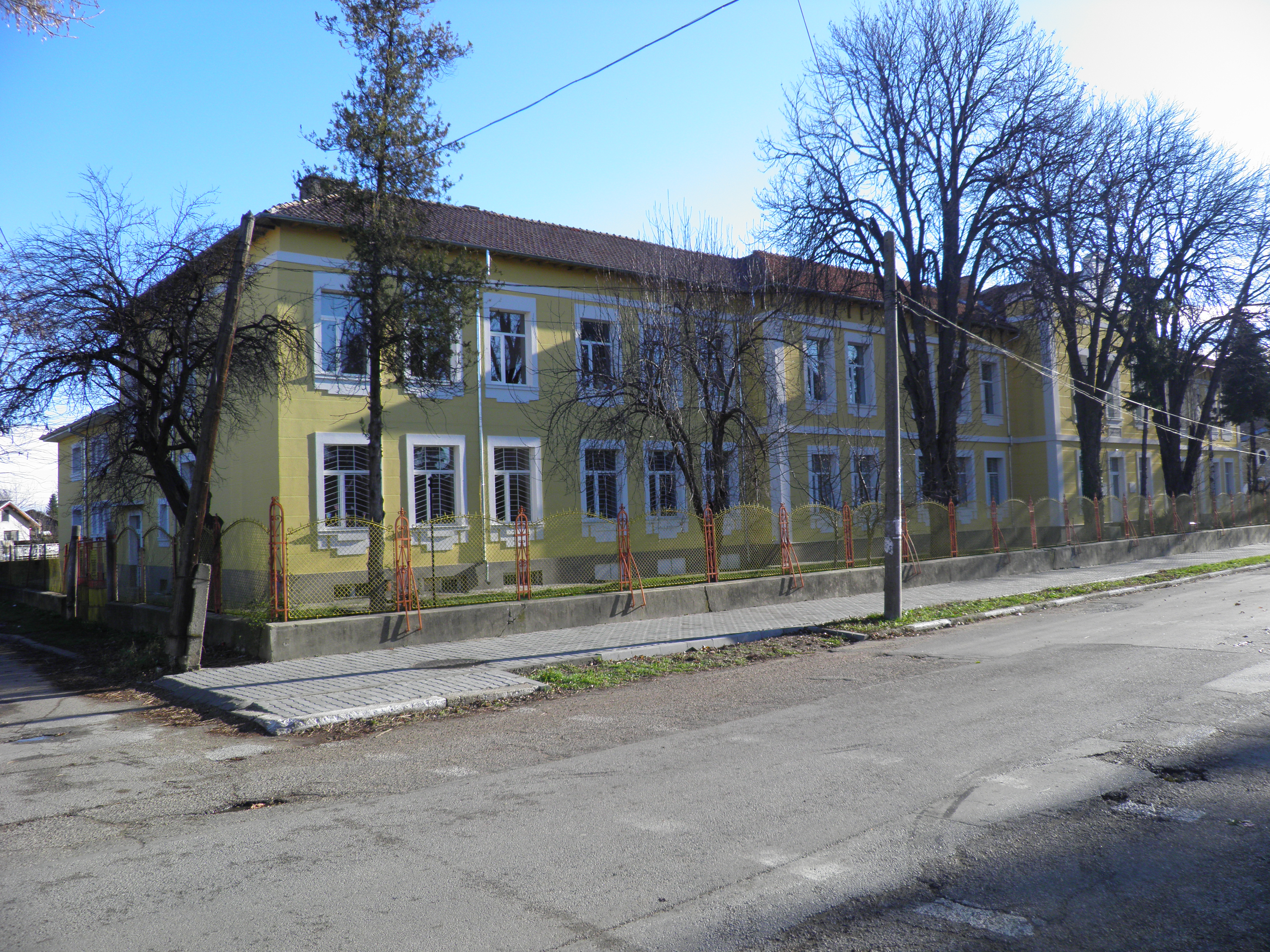
School

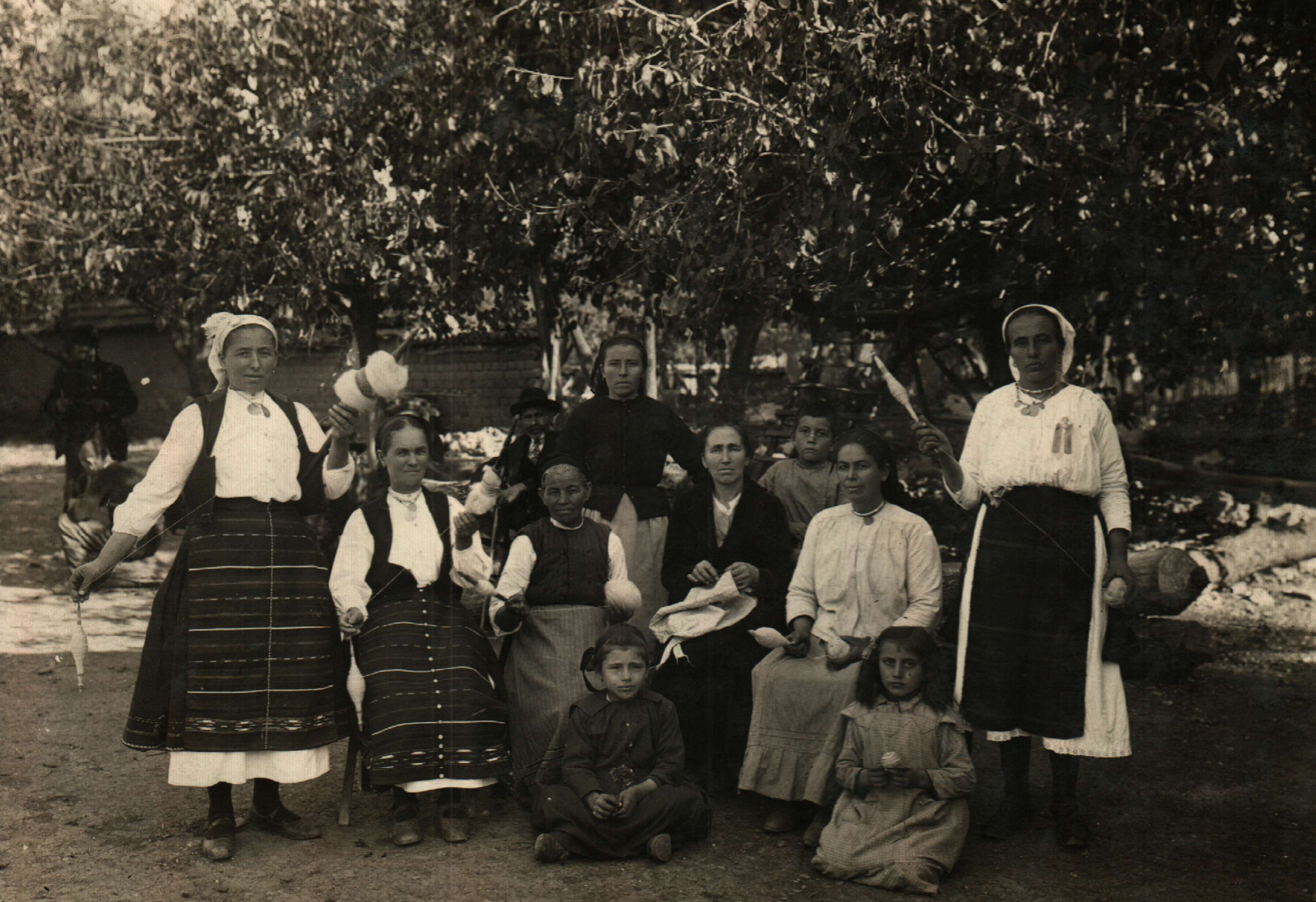
1951

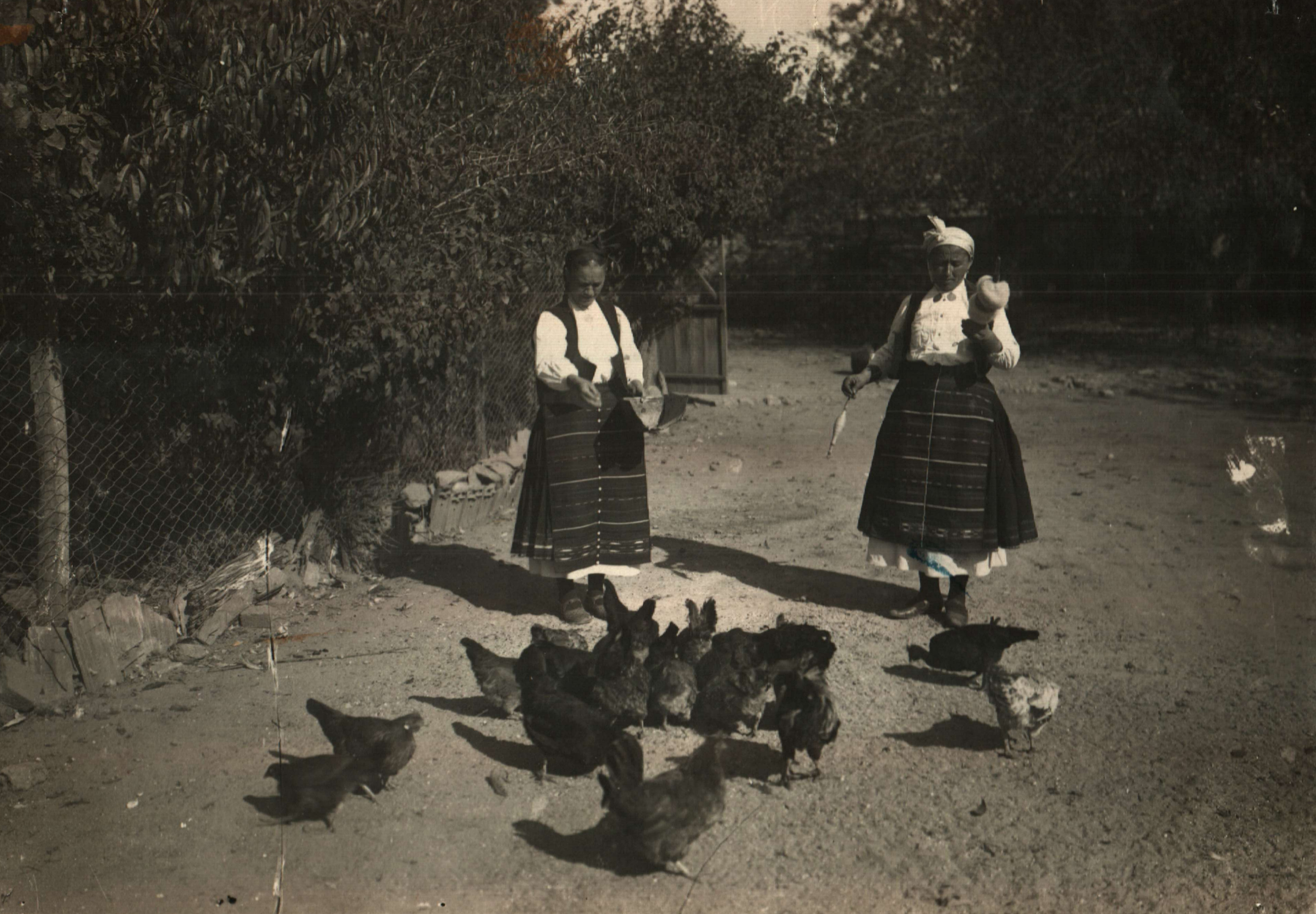
1945
