= Daskot =

Daskot Дъскот
- Village
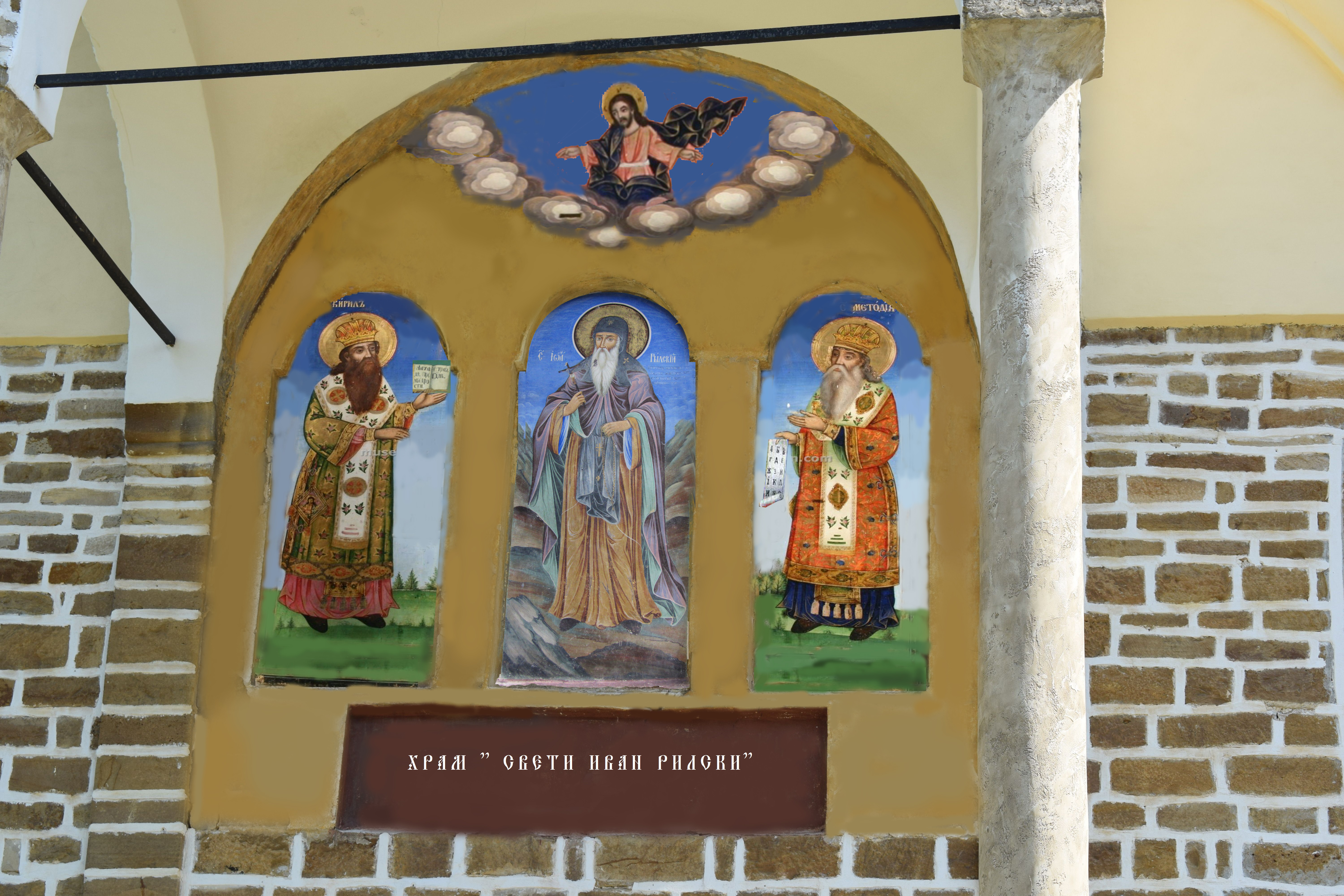
- Old, (Open after restoration) Bulgarian Orthodox Church in the Village Daskot.

- Location within Bulgaria
- Coordinates: 43°09′25″N 25°18′00″E
- Country: Bulgaria
- Province: Veliko Tarnovo
- Municipality: Pavlikeni

Area
  - Total: 31,436 km^{2} (12,138 sq mi)
- Elevation: 220 m (720 ft)

Population (2022)
  - Total: 426
  - Density: 0.0136/km^{2} (0.0351/sq mi)
- Time zone: UTC+2 (EET)
  - Summer (DST): UTC+3 (EEST)
- Post code: 5223
- Area code: 061394

Daskot (Bulgarian: Дъскот, pronounced ) is a Bulgarian village in Pavlikeni Municipality, Veliko Tarnovo Province in North Bulgaria.

== History ==
In the beginning of the 20th century, farming was the most popular job in the village. During the Socialist period, some people worked in the industrial part of Pavlikeni.

== Links ==
• The population statistics
