= Mihaltsi =

Coordinates: 43°12′N 25°21′E

Mihaltsi, or Mihalci, (Bulgarian: Михалци [miˈxaɫt͡si]) is a village in Pavlikeni Municipality, Veliko Tarnovo Province, northern Bulgaria. It is located at a distance of 9 km from the town of Pavlikeni, and 24 km from the city of Veliko Tarnovo.

== History ==
According to the legend the village were established in the 15th century. The founder of the village is Michal Mihallooglu, who is the heir of Gaizi Ali Fruz Bey. The village of Chugarevets was located in the village. One of the first priests in the village is Pop Staniu Georgiev, who served outdoor massages. The first church school was founded in 1816. The construction of the first church in Mihaltsi began in 1833. Three years later the temple was sanctified and was called the Orthodox Church of the Assumption. In 1870 was founded a community center "Saedinenie". In the school year 1926/1927, at the decision of the teachers' council, the junior high school was named "Todor L. Lefterov". On 1 Dec. In 1934 the junior high school was transformed into a primary school. In the school students from the surrounding villages are trained: Musina, Rusalia and Stambolovo. The village was based on the "Commune" in 1958.

== Geography ==
The area of the village is 36.558km2 and the altitude is 132m.

== Holidays ==
The last Saturday of August.
