= Whitkirk (disambiguation) =

Whitkirk is a suburb of east Leeds, England.

Whitkirk may also refer to:

- Ballywalter, County Down, Northern Ireland, a village
- Deanery of Whitkirk, in the Anglican Diocese of Leeds

== See also ==
- Whitekirk, East Lothian, Scotland, a village
- White Church (disambiguation)
- Whitchurch (disambiguation)
