= Weisskirchen =

Weisskirchen (also Weißkirchen or Weiskirchen) may refer to:

== Places ==
- Weißkirchen in Steiermark, Austria
- Weißkirchen an der Traun, Austria
- Bílý Kostel nad Nisou (German: Weißkirchen an der Neiße), Czech Republic
- Hranice (Přerov District) (German: Mährisch Weißkirchen), Czech Republic
- Blanche-Église (German: Weißkirchen), France
- Weiskirchen, Saarland, Germany
- Weiskirchen, within the town of Rodgau, Hesse, Germany
- Bela Crkva (German: Weißkirchen im Banat), Serbia
- Holíč (German: Weisskirchen an der March), Slovakia

== People ==
- Gert Weisskirchen (born 1944), German politician
- Max Weißkirchen (born 1996), German badminton player

== See also ==
- White Church (disambiguation) (English-language equivalent)
- Whitechurch (disambiguation) (English-language equivalent)
- Whitchurch (disambiguation) (English-language equivalent)
