= Krasen Trifonov =

Bulgarian footballer

Personal information
- Full name: Krasen Krasimirov Trifonov
- Date of birth: 5 December 1983 (age 42)
- Place of birth: Pavlikeni, Bulgaria
- Height: 1.81 m (5 ft 11 1/2 in)
- Position: Midfielder

Team information
- Current team: Pavlikeni
- Number: 11

Youth career
- Chernomorets Burgas

Senior career*
Years	Team	Apps	(Gls)
2002–2005	Chernomorets Burgas	45	(6)
2005–2007	Nesebar	47	(8)
2007–2009	Spartak Plovdiv	37	(5)
2009–2010	Lokomotiv Plovdiv	22	(1)
2011	Nesebar	5	(0)
2011–2012	Atletik Kuklen	?	(?)
2012–2013	Etar 1924	14	(1)
2013–2017	Lokomotiv GO	86	(12)
2017–2018	Pavlikeni	?	(?)
2018–2019	Lokomotiv GO	24	(2)
2019–	Pavlikeni	0	(0)
- * Club domestic league appearances and goals as of 1 June 2019

Krasen Trifonov (Bulgarian: Красен Трифонов; born 5 December 1983) is a Bulgarian football midfielder who plays for Pavlikeni.

== Career ==
Trifonov spent four seasons at Lokomotiv Gorna Oryahovitsa but was released in July 2017. In June 2018, he returned to the club following a short stint at Pavlikeni.
