= Rositsa, Veliko Tarnovo Province =

Rositsa Росица
- Village
- Location within Bulgaria
- Coordinates: 43°09′25″N 25°18′00″E
- Country: Bulgaria
- Province: Veliko Tarnovo Province
- Municipality: Pavlikeni

Area
  - Total: 7,915 km^{2} (3,056 sq mi)
- Elevation: 134 m (440 ft)

Population
  - Total: 177
- Time zone: UTC+2 (EET)
  - Summer (DST): UTC+3 (EEST)
- Post code: 5221
- Area code: 06134

Rositsa (Bulgarian: Росица) one from the three villages with the name Rositsa in Bulgaria. The village is located in Veliko Tarnovo Province.

== Geography ==
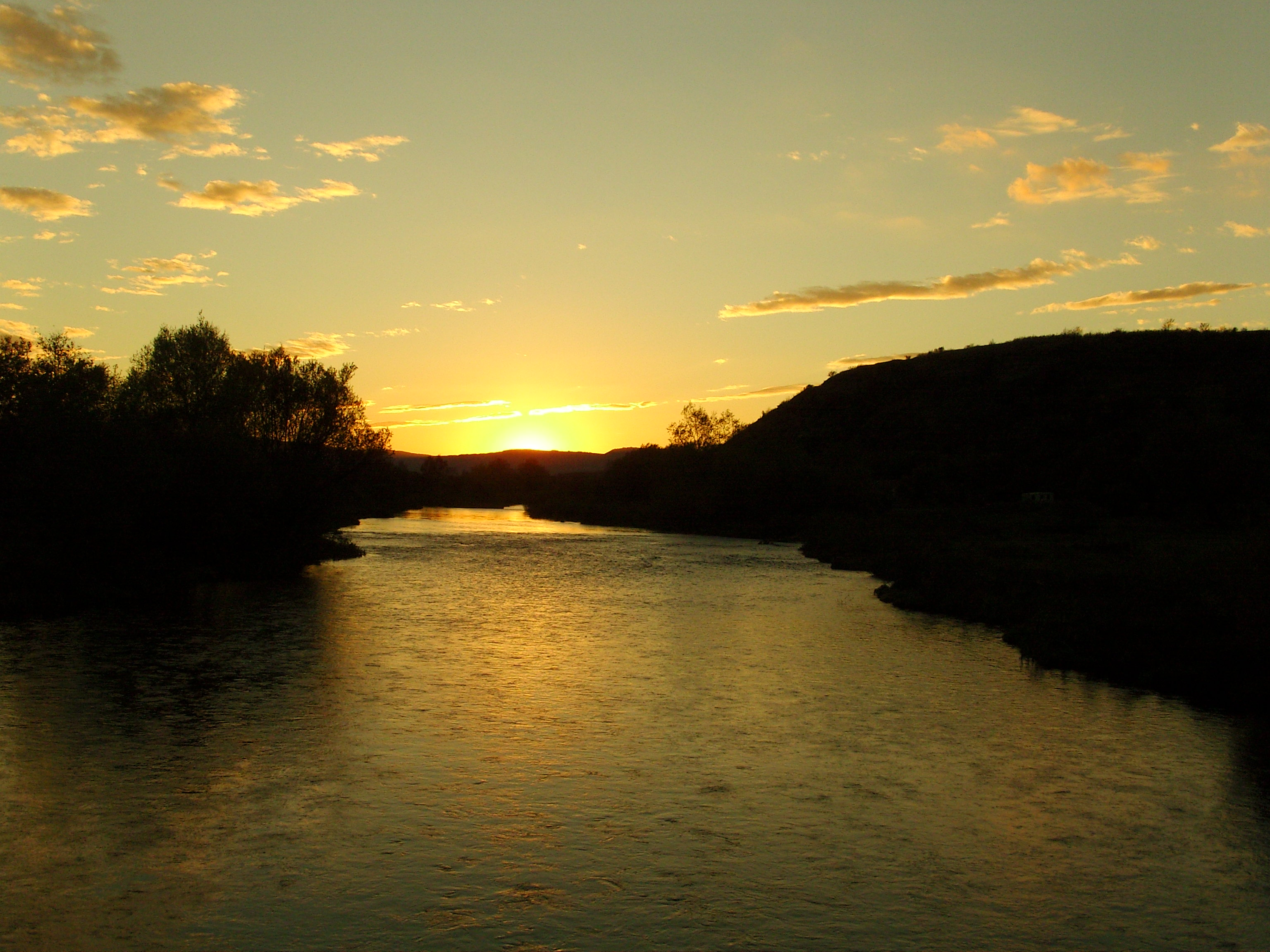
The river Rositsa

Rositsa is located at 6 km from Pavlikeni, and 4 km from Byala Cherkva. The river Rositsa flows near the village.

== History ==
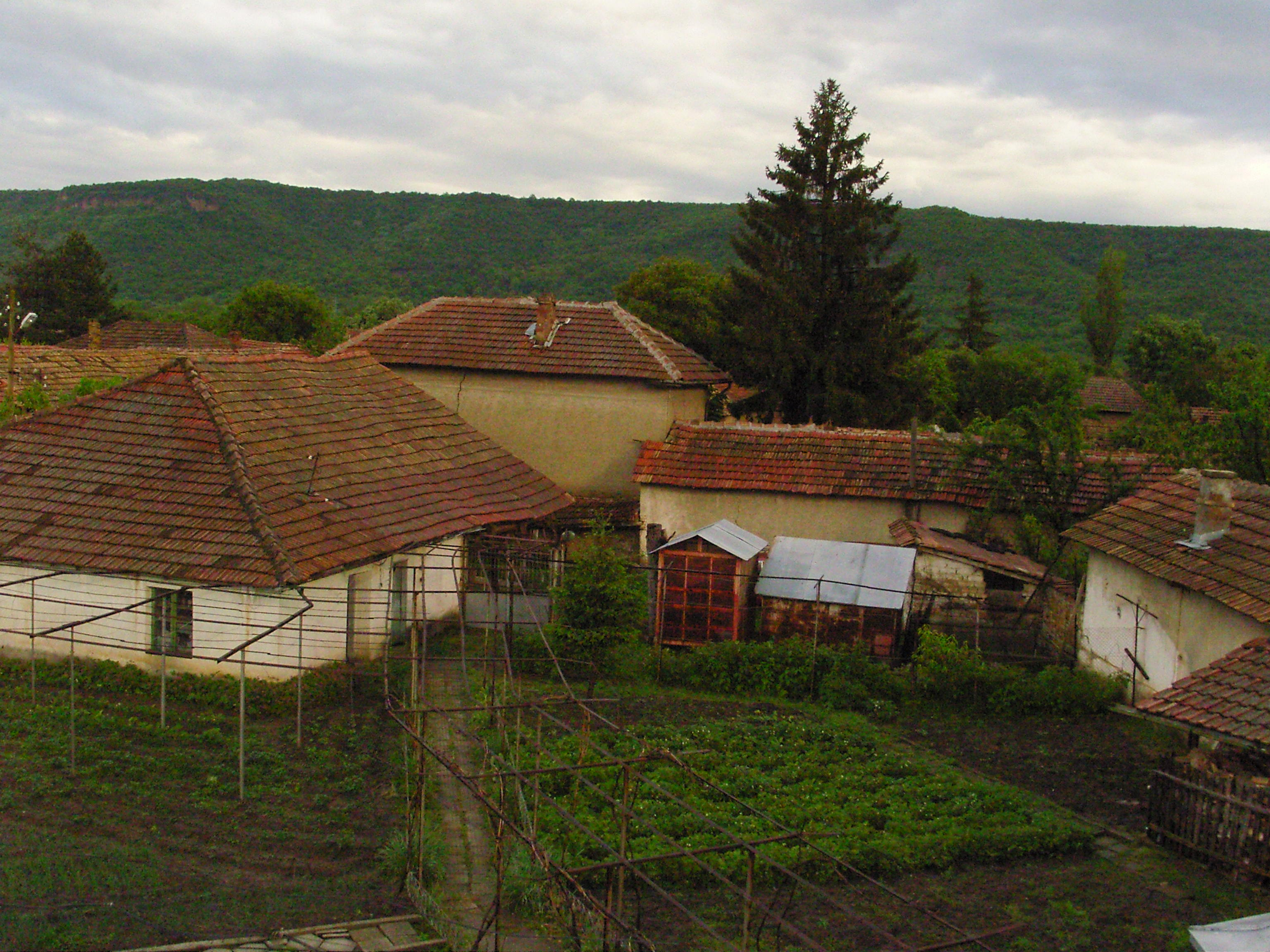

The village Rositsa was founded in the 15th century. In the areas Yortluka and Bati bara existed a village from the Byzantine period. This village was connected to the destroyed monastery Saint Ivan Predtecha. During the Ottoman rule the village suffered Islamization. Many Bulgarians moved to the nearest village Byala Cherkva. In the 1830s a few families such as Ignatovi, Halachevi, Sarbilashevi moved back to the village. After the Liberation of Bulgaria in 1878 many Bulgarians returned to the Rositsa. The Turks inhabited the south part of the village. The village was named Gruhcheva mahala until 1934. There was a large flood in 1939. In the 1950s the population was 870.

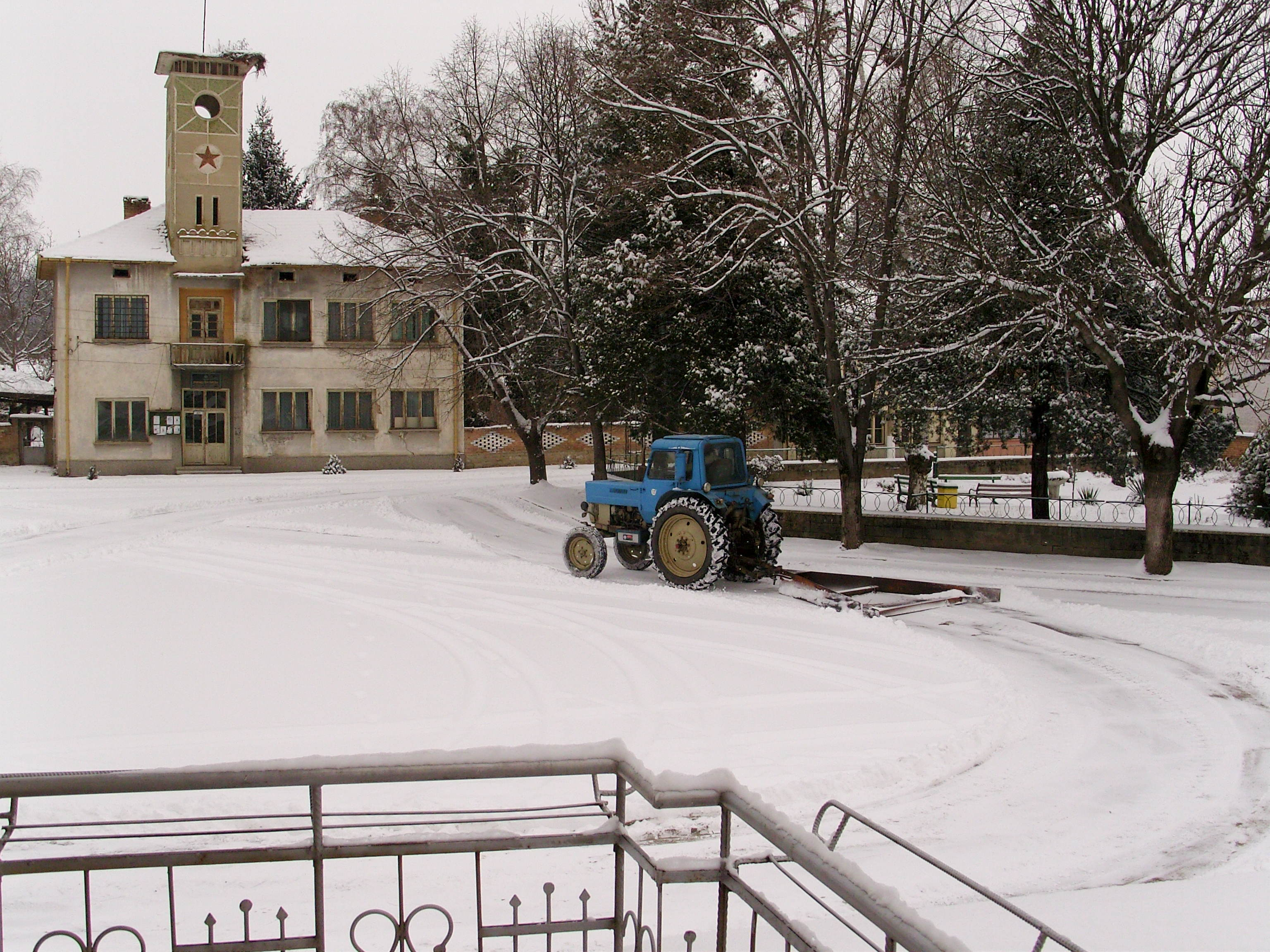
Center of the village

== Culture ==
=== Education ===
Primary school "Cyril and Methodius", founded in 1904.
