= Ventsislav Dimitrov =

Bulgarian footballer

Personal information
- Full name: Ventsislav Stoychev Dimitrov
- Date of birth: 27 March 1988 (age 38)
- Place of birth: Bulgaria
- Height: 1.84 m (6 ft 0 in)
- Position: Goalkeeper

Team information
- Current team: Pavlikeni
- Number: 1

Senior career*
Years	Team	Apps	(Gls)
2007–2012	Etar 1924	51	(0)
2013	Dobrudzha Dobrich	?	(0)
2013–2015	Etar	48	(0)
2015	Akademik Svishtov	?	(0)
2016	Oborishte	2	(0)
2016	Lyubimets		
2017	Litex		
2017–2018	Akademik Svishtov		
2018–	Pavlikeni		
- * Club domestic league appearances and goals as of 1 June 2016

Ventsislav Dimitrov (Bulgarian: Венцислав Димитров; born 27 March 1988) is a Bulgarian footballer, who plays as a goalkeeper for Pavlikeni.

== Career ==
On 18 January 2017, Dimitrov joined Litex Lovech.
