= Slomer =

Slomer Сломер
- Village
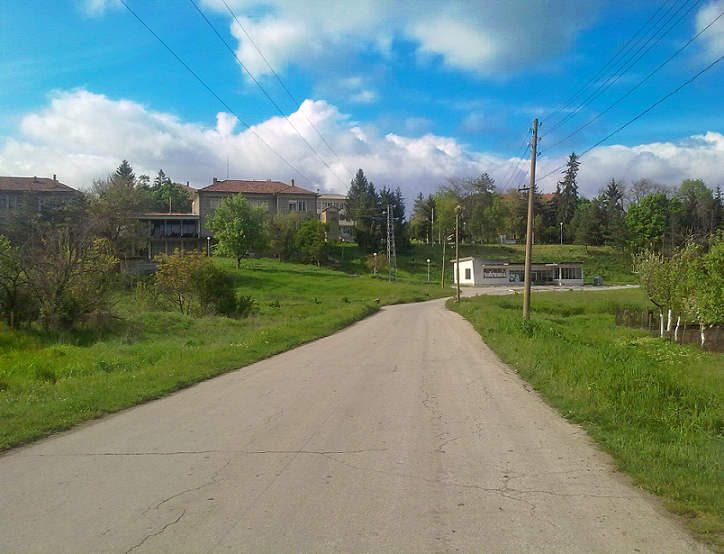

- Location within Bulgaria
- Coordinates: 43.367°N 25.3°E
- Country: Bulgaria
- Province: Veliko Tarnovo
- Municipality: Pavlikeni

Area
  - Total: 35.123 km^{2} (13.561 sq mi)

Population (1 January 2007)
  - Total: 531
  - Density: 15.1/km^{2} (39.2/sq mi)
- Postal code: 5229
- Area codes: 061391 within Bulgaria, 0035961391 from abroad

Slomer is a village in Northern Bulgaria. It is situated in Pavlikeni Municipality, Veliko Tarnovo Province.

== Geography ==
The village is located 15 km from Pavlikeni Municipality and about 40 km from Veliko Tarnovo Province. Slomer is adjacent to the village of Karaisen.

== History ==
There is a stele honouring the people who have fought for the freedom of Bulgaria. It can be found in the centre of Slomer on a fountain which is not currently running.

Unfortunately, there is a school and kindergarten as well, closed and crumbling.

== Religion and language ==
The population of the village consists of Christians. Spoken language – Bulgarian.

== Public institutions ==
A health office, the building of the village hall and church with frescos.

Three grocery stores, one of which combined with a cafe. Two cafes, which also function as taverns.

== Natural sights ==
The sites "Trite mogili" (Трите могили, The three mounds), "Slava mogila" (Слава могила, Slava mound), "Koriykata" (Корийката) and the Kosora forest with many trees and wolves around.

== Regular events ==
A market is held every Friday selling various goods required by the villagers. An annual fair is held on the third Saturday of October.
