= White Church =

White Church may refer to the following churches:

- White Church, Bucharest, Romania
- White Church, Iași, Romania
- White Church of Karan, Karan, Serbia
- White Church, Cainhoy, South Carolina, United States, on the National Register of Historic Places
- St Peter's Church, Warmsworth, Doncaster, England, nicknamed locally the "White Church"

== See also ==
- Equivalents in other languages:
  - Bela Crkva, a town and municipality in the South Banat District of the autonomous province of Vojvodina, Serbia
  - Bila Tserkva, a city in Kyiv Oblast, Ukraine
  - Bila Tserkva, Zakarpattia Oblast, Ukraine
  - Bijela Crkva, a village in Montenegro
  - Biserica Albă Postăvari (lit. White Church Postăvari), part of the Mihai Vodă Monastery, Romania
  - Blanche-Église, Moselle department, France, a commune
  - Byala Cherkva, Pavlikeni Municipality, Veliko Turnovo Province, Bulgaria, a town
- Whitechurch (disambiguation)
- Whitchurch (disambiguation)
