= FC Pavlikeni =

Bulgarian football club

Pavlikeni
- Full name: Football Club Pavlikeni
- Founded: 1928; 98 years ago
- Ground: Gancho Panov Stadium, Pavlikeni
- Capacity: 10,000
- Manager: Dimo Atanasov
- League: North-West Third League
- 2023–24: North-West Third League, 8th
Home colours	Away colours

Football Club Pavlikeni (Bulgarian: Павликени) are a Bulgarian football club based in Pavlikeni, who compete in the North-West Third League, the third division of Bulgarian football.

== History ==
The club was founded as Hadzhislavchev in 1928. In 1954, the club won promotion for the A Group for first time in the club's history. The team won just five games in their first A Group campaign in the 1955 season and were relegated, finishing on the last 14th place.

== Current squad ==
As of 1 September 2019 Note: Flags indicate national team as defined under FIFA eligibility rules; some limited exceptions apply. Players may hold more than one non-FIFA nationality.

No.	Pos.	Nation	Player
1	GK	BUL	Ventsislav Dimitrov
2	MF	BUL	Georgi Vasilev
3	DF	BUL	Georgi Hristov
4	MF	BUL	Tsvetomir Dodurov (captain)
5	MF	BUL	Yordan Petev
7	FW	BUL	Stefan Ginchev
8	MF	BUL	Daniel Yordanov
11	MF	BUL	Krasen Trifonov
12	GK	BUL	Ivaylo Petkov

No.	Pos.	Nation	Player
17	DF	BUL	Ivaylo Marinov
18	DF	BUL	Borislav Getsov
19	DF	BUL	Plamen Iliev
20	MF	BUL	Aleksandar Uzunov
22	DF	BUL	Ivaylo Velchev
23	MF	BUL	Borislav Ivanov
32	MF	BUL	Krasen Slavchev
77	FW	BUL	Nikola Kakamakov
