= Bela Crkva (disambiguation) =

Bela Crkva is a town in Vojvodina, Serbia.

Bela Crkva (Cyrillic: Бела Црква, pronounced [bɛ̂ːlaː tsr̩̂ːkv̞a], "White Church") may also refer to:

- Bela Crkva, Krivogaštani, a village in the Municipality of Krivogaštani, North Macedonia
- Bela Crkva (Krupanj), a village in the Mačva District of Serbia
- Toplička Bela Crkva, original name of the city of Kuršumlija, Serbia
- White Church of Karan (Bela crkva karanska) in the village of Karan, Serbia

== See also ==
- Bila Tserkva (Біла Церква), a city in the Kyiv Oblast of Ukraine
- Byala Cherkva, a town in the Veliko Turnovo oblast of Bulgaria
