= Stefan Ginchev =

Bulgarian footballer

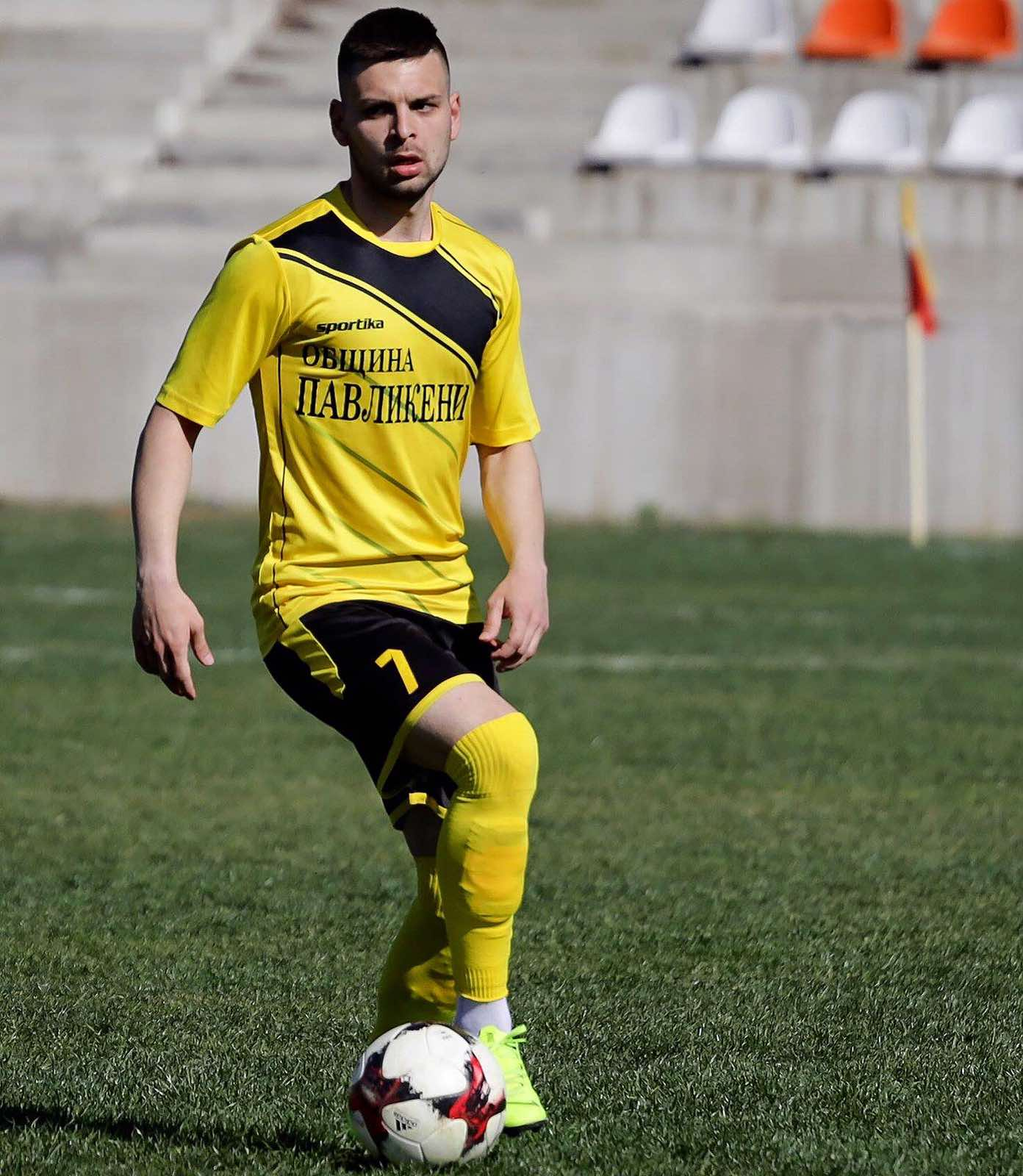
- Ginchev with FC Pavlikeni in 2019.

Personal information
- Full name: Stefan Milkov Ginchev
- Date of birth: 16 June 1994 (age 32)
- Place of birth: Pavlikeni, Bulgaria
- Height: 1.80 m (5 ft 11 in)
- Positions: Forward; attacking midfielder

Team information
- Current team: FC Pavlikeni
- Number: 7

Youth career
- 2004–2008: Pavlikeni
- 2008–2012: Vidima-Rakovski

Senior career*
Years	Team	Apps	(Gls)
2012–2013	Vidima-Rakovski	1	(0)
2013–2014	Etar Veliko Tarnovo	10	(0)
2014–2016	Vidima-Rakovski	15	(7)
2016–2019	Akademik Svishtov	56	(33)
2019–	FC Pavlikeni	64+	(35+)

International career
2012–2013	Bulgaria U19	1	(0)
- * Club domestic league appearances and goals

Stefan Milkov Ginchev (born 16 June 1994) (Bulgarian: Стефан Милков Гинчев), is a Bulgarian professional footballer who plays for FC Pavlikeni.

== Early life ==
Ginchev was born in Pavlikeni to Stela Chudomirova Gincheva, a teacher and Milko Georgiev Ginchev, a doctor. Also, they both were professional athletes: His mother was a handball player, while his father was a football referee. He has an elder brother, Georgi, who is currently a referee. When he is not on the field, he is a very family oriented person. Growing up, when he was about to choose football as his career, he said that it was very difficult for him as that would mean less time with his family, who he says play a major role in his life.

== Club career ==
The city of Pavlikeni was also the place where Ginchev first learned to master his skills as a footballer. He spent his early years playing for his local team and by the time he turned thirteen years old, he had already made a name for himself as one of Bulgaria's top footballers.

In 2007, Ginchev became one of the regional winners in the national Children and Football programme in Bulgaria. He was given an award by the Bulgarian football stars Dimitar Berbatov and Martin Petrov on a special ceremony in Sofia.

He was then spotted by Vidima-Rakovski and moved to the club of Sevlievo at the age of fourteen. From 2008 to 2012 he played for the youth teams and showed some very good skills. It wasn't long before he started to catch the attention of other big Bulgarian clubs. He eventually chose to stay with the club and stressed to the public that he had no intentions of leaving.

In 2010, Ginchev signed a contract with the American sportswear manufacturer Nike. The brand unveiled a marketing exercise in Bulgaria, aiming to make young athletes look like the biggest stars in the business. He was the first youngster to be equipped under that scheme.

In May 2012, he made his professional debut in First Professional Football League in a game against Botev Vratsa.

== Honours ==
- Regional winner in the national Children and Football programme in Bulgaria: 2007
