= Bacho Kiro =

19th-century Bulgarian revolutionary

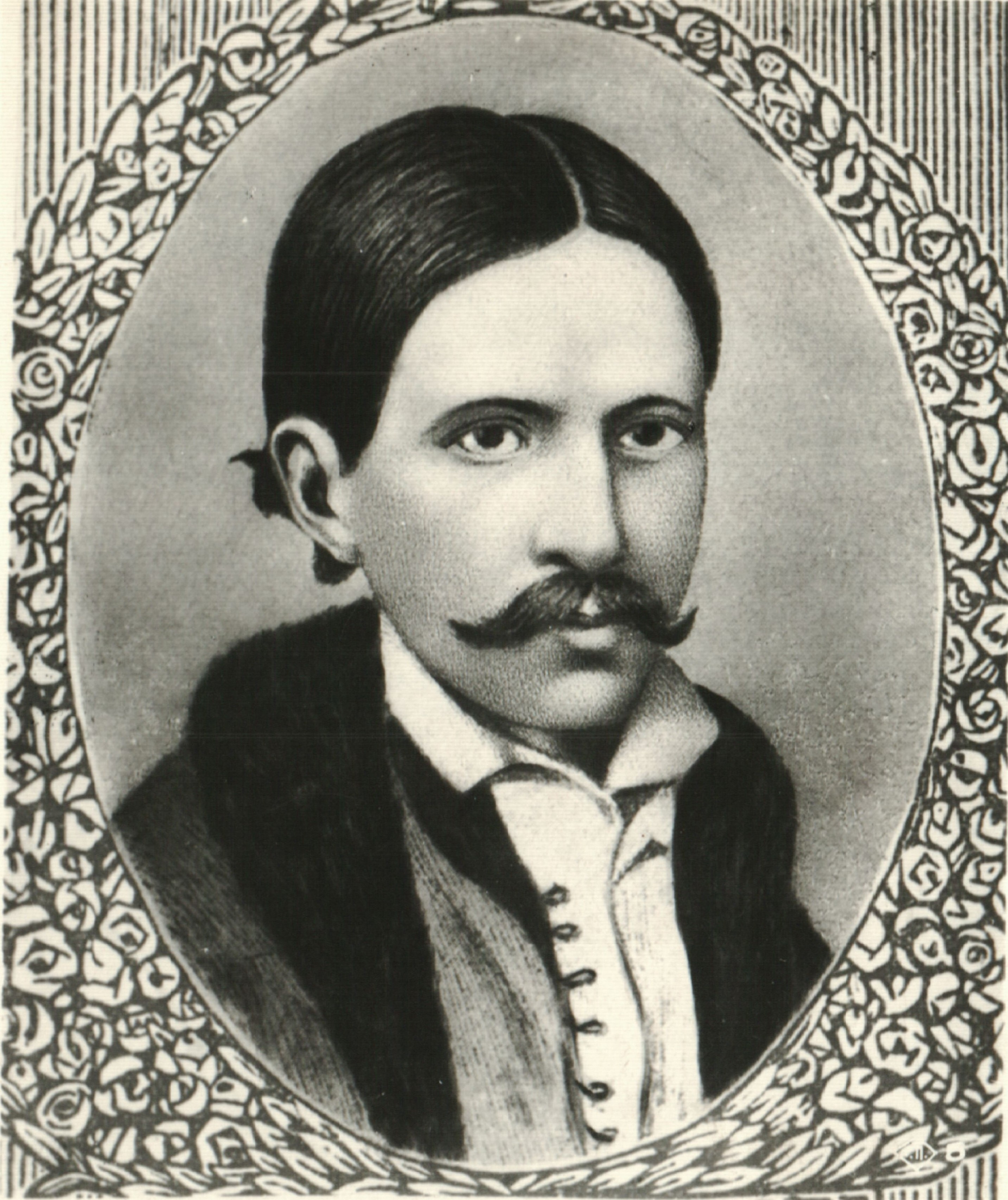
Bacho Kiro (1835–1876)

Bacho Kiro (Bulgarian: Бачо Киро) (7 July 1835 – 28 May 1876) was the nickname of Kiro Petrov Zanev (Киро Петров Занев), a Bulgarian teacher, man of letters and revolutionary who took an active part in the April Uprising.

Bacho Kiro was born in what is today Byala Cherkva, Veliko Tarnovo Province (then called Gorni Turcheta), to the family of the herdsman Petar Zanev. After finishing the religious school in his village, he joined the Batoshevo Monastery as a neophyte. From 1852 on, he worked as a teacher in various villages, including Koevtsi, Musina, Mihaltsi, Vishovgrad and his native Byala Cherkva, where he lived and taught from 1857 to 1876 with some interruptions. Bacho Kiro also travelled around the Bulgarian lands by foot, calling for armed resistance against the Ottoman rule, and visited Istanbul, Mount Athos, Belgrade and Bucharest. Bacho Kiro established a number of cultural centres (chitalishta); in February 1872, he became the Byala Cherkva head of Vasil Levski's Internal Revolutionary Organisation.

Upon the outbreak of the April Uprising in 1876, Bacho Kiro was among the uprising's leaders in the Tarnovo district and a sub-voivode in Father Hariton's detachment. Bacho Kiro took part in the Dryanovo Monastery fightings, and although his detachment was routed by the Ottomans, he managed to escape. However, he was betrayed and captured by the Ottoman government. He was sentenced to death and hanged in Tarnovo. Before his execution, he held a passionate speech and did not ask for mercy.

Bacho Kiro was the author of some travel notes and the drama piece Poor Man Tancho. The Bacho Kiro cave near Dryanovo is named in his honour.
