= Whitchurch Rural District =

Whitchurch Rural District may refer to the following rural districts of England:

- Whitchurch Rural District, Hampshire
- Whitchurch Rural District, Herefordshire
- Whitchurch Rural District, Shropshire
