= St Peter's Church, Warmsworth =

Church in Warmsworth, South Yorkshire, England

Coordinates: 53°30′01″N 1°10′05″W

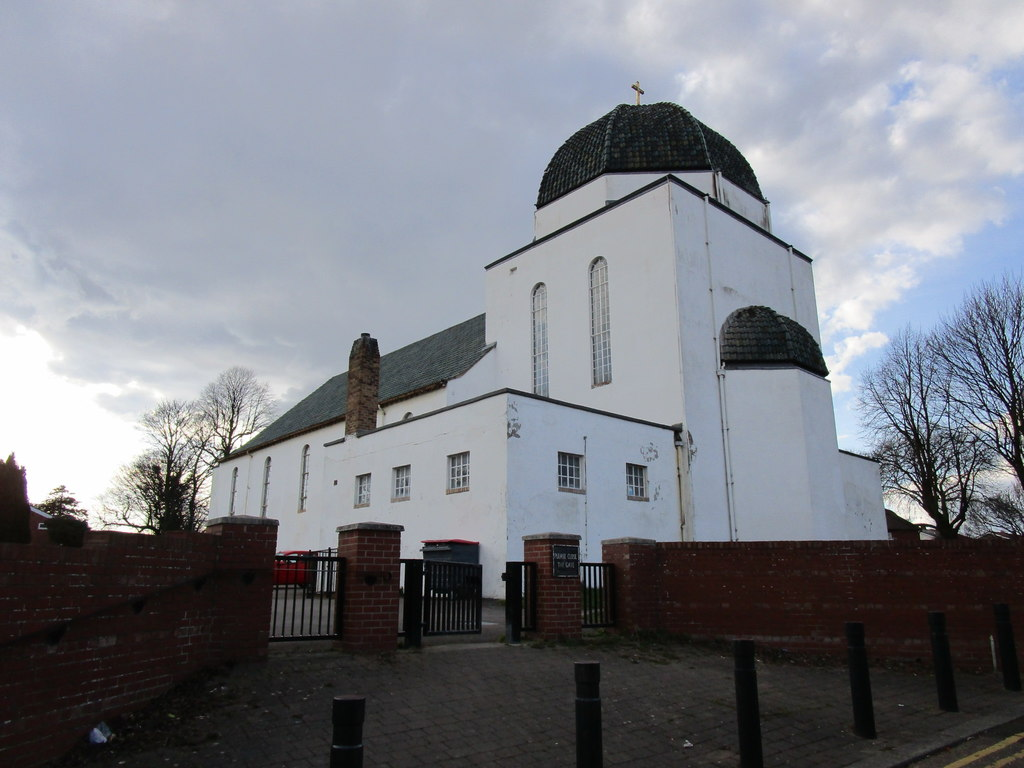
The church, from the south-east, in 2018

St Peter's Church is the parish church of Warmsworth, south-west of Doncaster in South Yorkshire, in England.

The original St Peter's Church was mediaeval. It was restored in the Georgian period and rebuilt in the Victorian era. In 1939, a new St Peter's Church was commissioned by Reverend Herbert Raison, on a site half a mile from the original, and was funded by selling the old site. The church was designed by Brundell & Faran, and built by P. P. Taylor. It was consecrated in 1942; the National Churches Trust claims that it was the only church in England to be consecrated during the Second World War. It was mentioned in a propaganda broadcaster by William Joyce. In 2003, the church was Grade II listed.

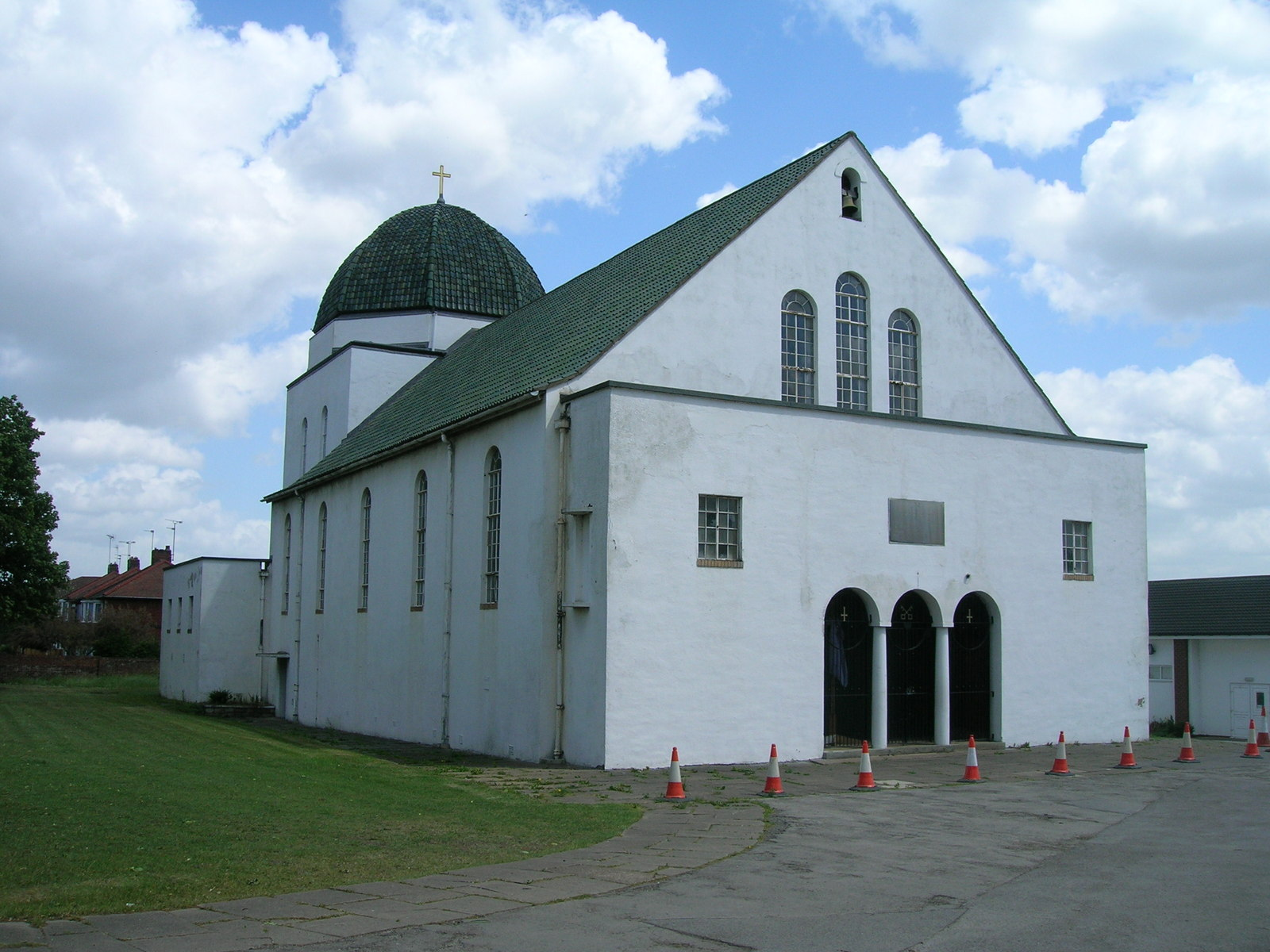
The church, from the north-west, in 2011

The church is built of brick, which is painted and rendered, leading to the local nickname of the "White Church". The roof is covered in blue and green pantiles. The church has a wide nave, with a west porch, and a chancel with an octagonal dome. To the left of the chancel is the Lady Chapel, and to the right is the vestry. The porch has triple arched doorways, and most of the windows are narrow and round-headed. The vestry has a brick chimney stack.

Inside the church, there are stairs up to a west gallery, which contained a 19th-century organ. Items brought from the old church include a poor box and 19th century stone font. The nave has a wood block floor in a herringbone pattern, and there are a wooden pulpit and lectern, and painted wooden pews. There are marble steps up from the nave to the sanctuary, and again up to the altar. The altar is faced in similar marble, and there are 1930s statues of Christ, Mary, and St Peter. The Lady Chapel contained various fragments from the old church, including tombstones and memorial tablets, and a mediaeval piscina.

== See also ==
- Listed buildings in Doncaster (Balby South Ward)
