= Milan Milkov =

Macedonian basketball player

EuroNickel 2005
- Position: Center
- League: Macedonian First League

Personal information
- Born: December 19, 1996 (age 29) Kavadarci, Macedonia
- Listed height: 2.06 m (6 ft 9 in)

Career information
- Playing career: 2013–present

Career history
- 2013–present: EuroNickel 2005

Milan Milkov (born December 19, 1996) is a Macedonian professional basketball Power forward who currently plays for EuroNickel 2005 in the Macedonian First League.
