= Whitchurch railway station =

Whitchurch station may refer to:

- Whitchurch railway station (Wales), in Cardiff
- Whitchurch railway station (Hampshire), in England
- Whitchurch Town railway station, a former station on the Didcot, Newbury & Southampton line in Hampshire
- Whitchurch railway station (Shropshire), in England
- Whitchurch Halt, a former station on the Bristol and North Somerset Railway
