= Dimitar Yordanov =

Dimitar Yordanov may refer to:

- Dimitar Yordanov (footballer), Bulgarian footballer
- Dimitar Yordanov (gymnast), Bulgarian gymnast
