= Whitechurch =

Whitechurch may refer to:

== Places ==
- Whitechurch, County Cork, Ireland
- Whitechurch, County Dublin, Ireland
- Whitechurch, County Kildare, Ireland
- Whitechurch, County Down, a townland in the civil parish of Ballywalter, Northern Ireland
- Whitechurch, Ontario, Canada

== People ==
- Victor Whitechurch, an English clergyman and author

== See also ==
- White Church (disambiguation)
- Whitchurch (disambiguation)
