= Pavlikeni =

Pavlikeni Павликени
- Town
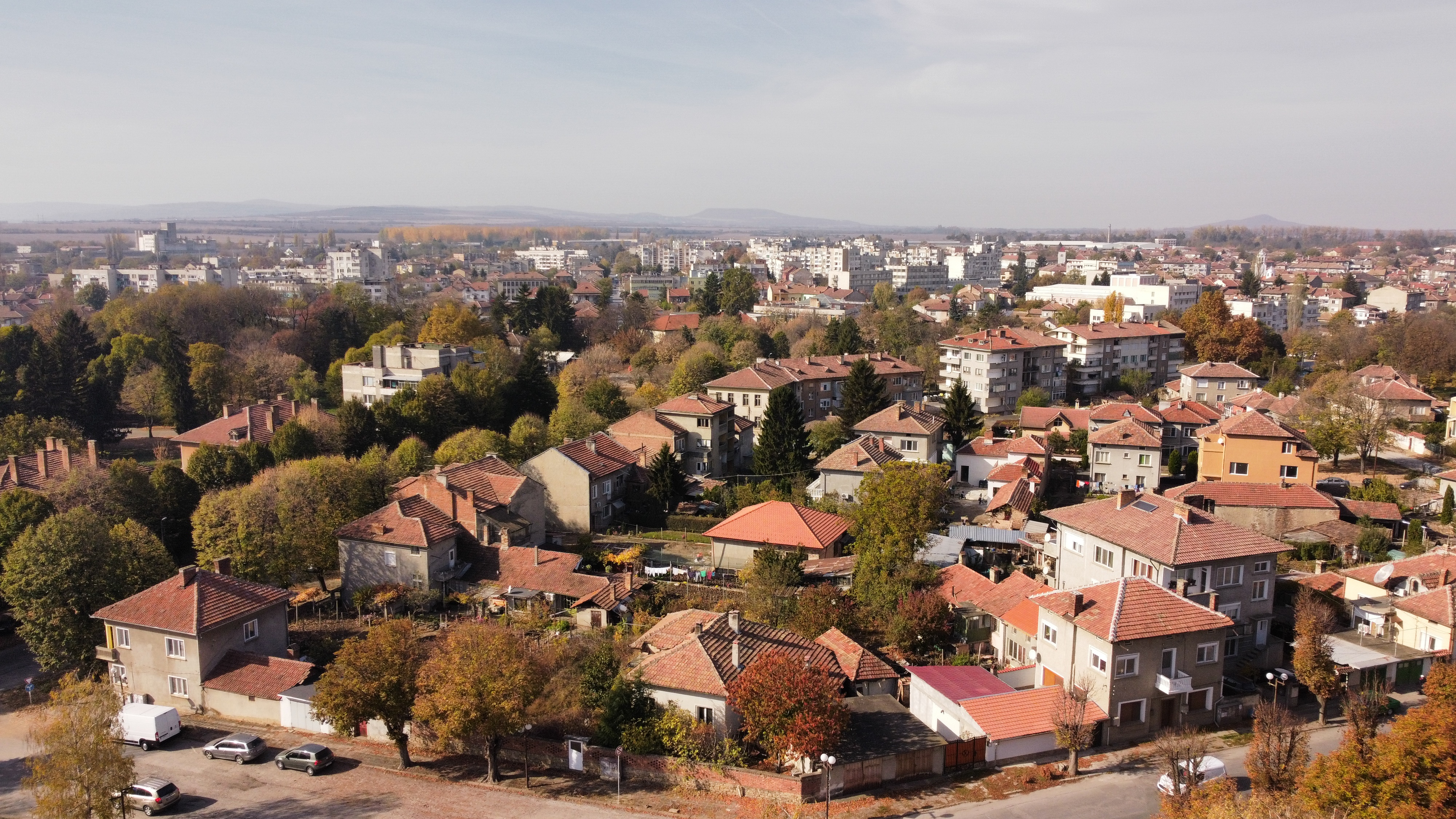

- Location of Pavlikeni
- Coordinates: 43°14′34″N 25°19′18″E
- Country: Bulgaria
- Province (Oblast): Veliko Tarnovo
- Municipality: Pavlikeni

Government
  - Mayor: Emanuil Manolov
  - Deputy Mayor: Maria Goranova
- Elevation: 144 m (472 ft)

Population (2024-12-31)
  - Total: 8,052
- Time zone: UTC+2 (EET)
  - Summer (DST): UTC+3 (EEST)
- Postal Code: 5200
- Area code: 0610

Pavlikeni (Bulgarian: Павликени [pɐvliˈkɛni]) is a town in Veliko Tarnovo Province, Northern Bulgaria, about 41 kilometers from the city of Veliko Tarnovo. It is the administrative centre of the homonymous Pavlikeni Municipality. As of December 2024, the town had a population of 8,052.

== History ==
Pavlikeni was a centre of ceramics and pottery in Antiquity as evidenced by the remains from Roman and Thracian times. Its name derives from the Paulicians, a Christian sect settled in Thrace by Leo the Isaurian. The modern town emerged in the 13th–14th centuries as a village initially called Marinopoltsi.

During the Ottoman rule of Bulgaria, the demographics of the village changed significantly, as many Turks settled to make it a purely Turkish village. After the Liberation of Bulgaria from Ottoman rule in 1877–1878, the Turks left to be replaced by Bulgarians from the Balkan Mountains and the villages of the plains. After the Liberation Pavlikeni developed as a centre of craftsmanship and trade, with many new buildings being constructed. Pavlikeni acquired town status in 1943 owing much to its position on the Sofia-Varna railway line.

== Notable natives ==
- Nicola Ghiuselev - opera singer
- Kiril Rakarov - former Bulgarian national football player

== Honour ==
Pavlikeni Point on Greenwich Island, South Shetland Islands is named after Pavlikeni.

== Changes in the city ==
After Bulgaria became a part of the European Union Pavlikeni created a project, which was an idea to improve the city as a whole by using the European funds. Pavlikeni took over a half a million to improve its conditions of the city centre "Svoboda". The project was realised starting 10 May 2012, with having 120 days to be completed in.

== Economy ==
The town had a factory for steel disc wheels and rims which export around five-eighths of the production to the European Union market. The other big factory in the town is Metarem, which makes farming transport machinery. There's also a cardboard factory.

=== Food economy ===
The town had one of the biggest companies in North Bulgaria for seeds, and a smaller factory for sweets and larger company for animal feed.

== Education ==
- Tzanko Tzerkovski `s farming high school
- Bacho Kiro High School
- OU"Sv.Kliment Ohridski"

== Transport ==
- Pavlikeni railway station - a stop on the Sofia-Varna line.
- Pavlikeni bus station

== International relations ==
=== Twin towns — Sister cities ===
Pavlikeni is twinned with:

- Pruzhany, Belarus (2000)
- Szigetszentmárton, Hungary (2008)

== Gallery ==
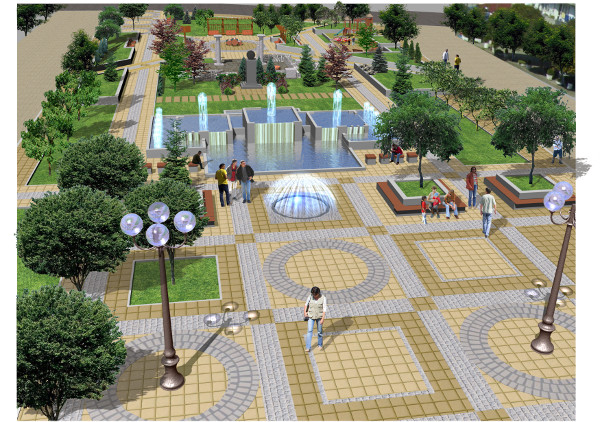
The final design of the project for the city centre that must be completed in 120 days.
